= Meanings of minor-planet names: 153001–154000 =

As minor planet discoveries are confirmed, they are given a permanent number by the IAU's Minor Planet Center (MPC), and the discoverers can then submit names for them, following the IAU's naming conventions. The list below concerns those minor planets in the specified number-range that have received names, and explains the meanings of those names.

Official naming citations of newly named small Solar System bodies are approved and published in a bulletin by IAU's Working Group for Small Bodies Nomenclature (WGSBN). Before May 2021, citations were published in MPC's Minor Planet Circulars for many decades. Recent citations can also be found on the JPL Small-Body Database (SBDB). Until his death in 2016, German astronomer Lutz D. Schmadel compiled these citations into the Dictionary of Minor Planet Names (DMP) and regularly updated the collection.

Based on Paul Herget's The Names of the Minor Planets, Schmadel also researched the unclear origin of numerous asteroids, most of which had been named prior to World War II. This article incorporates text from this source, which is in the public domain: SBDB New namings may only be added to this list below after official publication as the preannouncement of names is condemned. The WGSBN publishes a comprehensive guideline for the naming rules of non-cometary small Solar System bodies.

== 153001–153100 ==
Named minor planet	Provisional	This minor planet was named for...	Ref · Catalog
153078 Giovale	2000 QW_{245}	John P. Giovale (born 1943), chairman of the Lowell Observatory Advisory Board during 2001–2007	JPL · 153078

== 153101–153200 ==
back to top

Named minor planet	Provisional	This minor planet was named for...	Ref · Catalog
There are no named minor planets in this number range

== 153201–153300 ==
back to top

Named minor planet	Provisional	This minor planet was named for...	Ref · Catalog
153284 Frieman	2001 DU_{109}	Joshua Frieman (born 1959), American astronomer and contributor to the Sloan Digital Sky Survey	JPL · 153284
153289 Rebeccawatson	2001 FB_{10}	Rebecca Watson (born 1980), American radio, blog, and Internet (The Skeptics' Guide to the Universe) science advocate	JPL · 153289
153298 Paulmyers	2001 FC_{122}	PZ Myers (born 1957), American associate professor of biology and public educator, author of the blog Pharyngula	JPL · 153298

== 153301–153400 ==
back to top

Named minor planet	Provisional	This minor planet was named for...	Ref · Catalog
153301 Alissamearle	2001 FR_{183}	Alissa M. Earle (born 1991) completed her PhD research on Pluto's long-term seasonal cycles at the Massachusetts Institute of Technology while serving as a composition analysis team member for the New Horizons mission to Pluto.	JPL · 153301
153333 Jeanhugues	2001 OR_{50}	Jean-Hugues Blanc (born 1971), French member of the Astronomical Society of Montpellier (French: Société astronomique de Montpellier) and astronomer at the discovery Pises Observatory	JPL · 153333

== 153401–153500 ==
back to top

Named minor planet	Provisional	This minor planet was named for...	Ref · Catalog
There are no named minor planets in this number range

== 153501–153600 ==
back to top

Named minor planet	Provisional	This minor planet was named for...	Ref · Catalog
There are no named minor planets in this number range

== 153601–153700 ==
back to top

Named minor planet	Provisional	This minor planet was named for...	Ref · Catalog
153686 Pathall	2001 TZ_{242}	Patrick Hall (born 1968), Canadian-American astronomer with the Sloan Digital Sky Survey	JPL · 153686

== 153701–153800 ==
back to top

Named minor planet	Provisional	This minor planet was named for...	Ref · Catalog
There are no named minor planets in this number range

== 153801–153900 ==
back to top

Named minor planet	Provisional	This minor planet was named for...	Ref · Catalog
There are no named minor planets in this number range

== 153901–154000 ==
back to top

Named minor planet	Provisional	This minor planet was named for...	Ref · Catalog
There are no named minor planets in this number range

back to top

Preceded by 152,001–153,000	Meanings of minor-planet names List of minor planets: 153,001–154,000	Succeeded by 154,001–155,000
