= List of minor planets: 153001–154000 =

The following is a partial list of minor planets, running from minor-planet number 153001 through 154000, inclusive. The primary data for this and other partial lists is based on JPL's "Small-Body Orbital Elements" and data available from the Minor Planet Center. Critical list information is also provided by the MPC, unless otherwise specified from Lowell Observatory. A detailed description of the table's columns and additional sources are given on the main page including a complete list of every page in this series, and a statistical break-up on the dynamical classification of minor planets.

Also see the summary list of all named bodies in numerical and alphabetical order, and the corresponding naming citations for the number range of this particular list. New namings may only be added to this list after official publication, as the preannouncement of names is condemned by the Working Group for Small Bodies Nomenclature of the International Astronomical Union.

| Near-Earth obj. | MBA (inner) | MBA (outer) | Centaur |
| Mars-crosser | MBA (middle) | Jupiter trojan | Trans-Neptunian obj. |
| Unclassified |

== 153001–153100 ==
| Designation | | | Discovery | | | Properties | | Ref |
| Permanent | Provisional | Named after | Date | Site | Discoverer(s) | Category | Diam. | Ref |
|---|---|---|---|---|---|---|---|---|
| 153001 | 2000 JM_{4} | — | May 1, 2000 | Kitt Peak | Spacewatch | · | 3.5 km | MPC · JPL |
| 153002 | 2000 JG_{5} | — | May 2, 2000 | Socorro | LINEAR | APO +1km · PHA | 780 m | MPC · JPL |
| 153003 | 2000 JH_{30} | — | May 7, 2000 | Socorro | LINEAR | · | 1.5 km | MPC · JPL |
| 153004 | 2000 JU_{30} | — | May 7, 2000 | Socorro | LINEAR | · | 1.7 km | MPC · JPL |
| 153005 | 2000 JA_{31} | — | May 7, 2000 | Socorro | LINEAR | · | 3.2 km | MPC · JPL |
| 153006 | 2000 JQ_{35} | — | May 7, 2000 | Socorro | LINEAR | ERI | 3.5 km | MPC · JPL |
| 153007 | 2000 JU_{35} | — | May 7, 2000 | Socorro | LINEAR | NYS | 2.0 km | MPC · JPL |
| 153008 | 2000 JA_{44} | — | May 7, 2000 | Socorro | LINEAR | PHO | 3.3 km | MPC · JPL |
| 153009 | 2000 JM_{52} | — | May 9, 2000 | Socorro | LINEAR | · | 3.2 km | MPC · JPL |
| 153010 | 2000 JZ_{55} | — | May 6, 2000 | Socorro | LINEAR | · | 1.9 km | MPC · JPL |
| 153011 | 2000 JN_{78} | — | May 10, 2000 | Anderson Mesa | LONEOS | · | 1.0 km | MPC · JPL |
| 153012 | 2000 JG_{87} | — | May 2, 2000 | McDonald | Farnham, T. L. | · | 1.5 km | MPC · JPL |
| 153013 | 2000 KO_{8} | — | May 28, 2000 | Socorro | LINEAR | V | 1.0 km | MPC · JPL |
| 153014 | 2000 KQ_{8} | — | May 28, 2000 | Socorro | LINEAR | MAS | 1.0 km | MPC · JPL |
| 153015 | 2000 KP_{27} | — | May 28, 2000 | Socorro | LINEAR | · | 2.5 km | MPC · JPL |
| 153016 | 2000 KM_{36} | — | May 28, 2000 | Socorro | LINEAR | MAS | 1.0 km | MPC · JPL |
| 153017 | 2000 KR_{38} | — | May 24, 2000 | Kitt Peak | Spacewatch | MAS | 1.0 km | MPC · JPL |
| 153018 | 2000 KN_{41} | — | May 27, 2000 | Socorro | LINEAR | NYS | 1.8 km | MPC · JPL |
| 153019 | 2000 KW_{41} | — | May 27, 2000 | Socorro | LINEAR | · | 1.9 km | MPC · JPL |
| 153020 | 2000 KF_{49} | — | May 30, 2000 | Kitt Peak | Spacewatch | MAS | 1.1 km | MPC · JPL |
| 153021 | 2000 KU_{57} | — | May 24, 2000 | Anderson Mesa | LONEOS | · | 1.2 km | MPC · JPL |
| 153022 | 2000 LV_{6} | — | June 1, 2000 | Kitt Peak | Spacewatch | · | 1.9 km | MPC · JPL |
| 153023 | 2000 LA_{32} | — | June 5, 2000 | Anderson Mesa | LONEOS | · | 2.6 km | MPC · JPL |
| 153024 | 2000 LQ_{36} | — | June 1, 2000 | Haleakala | NEAT | · | 1.5 km | MPC · JPL |
| 153025 | 2000 NK_{23} | — | July 5, 2000 | Anderson Mesa | LONEOS | MIS | 3.6 km | MPC · JPL |
| 153026 | 2000 NH_{25} | — | July 4, 2000 | Anderson Mesa | LONEOS | · | 2.4 km | MPC · JPL |
| 153027 | 2000 OP | — | July 23, 2000 | Reedy Creek | J. Broughton | fast | 2.0 km | MPC · JPL |
| 153028 | 2000 OW_{7} | — | July 30, 2000 | Socorro | LINEAR | · | 7.2 km | MPC · JPL |
| 153029 | 2000 OT_{37} | — | July 30, 2000 | Socorro | LINEAR | · | 5.6 km | MPC · JPL |
| 153030 | 2000 PV_{1} | — | August 1, 2000 | Socorro | LINEAR | · | 4.8 km | MPC · JPL |
| 153031 | 2000 PM_{9} | — | August 6, 2000 | Siding Spring | R. H. McNaught | · | 5.8 km | MPC · JPL |
| 153032 | 2000 PB_{15} | — | August 1, 2000 | Socorro | LINEAR | NYS | 1.8 km | MPC · JPL |
| 153033 | 2000 PC_{16} | — | August 1, 2000 | Socorro | LINEAR | · | 1.8 km | MPC · JPL |
| 153034 | 2000 PY_{17} | — | August 1, 2000 | Socorro | LINEAR | · | 2.8 km | MPC · JPL |
| 153035 | 2000 PR_{18} | — | August 1, 2000 | Socorro | LINEAR | · | 1.7 km | MPC · JPL |
| 153036 | 2000 PC_{24} | — | August 2, 2000 | Socorro | LINEAR | MAS | 1.1 km | MPC · JPL |
| 153037 | 2000 PZ_{25} | — | August 4, 2000 | Haleakala | NEAT | · | 2.9 km | MPC · JPL |
| 153038 | 2000 QT | — | August 23, 2000 | Olathe | Robinson, L. | ADE | 4.6 km | MPC · JPL |
| 153039 | 2000 QH_{4} | — | August 24, 2000 | Socorro | LINEAR | · | 1.7 km | MPC · JPL |
| 153040 | 2000 QX_{6} | — | August 24, 2000 | Socorro | LINEAR | H | 910 m | MPC · JPL |
| 153041 | 2000 QZ_{10} | — | August 24, 2000 | Socorro | LINEAR | · | 2.1 km | MPC · JPL |
| 153042 | 2000 QP_{14} | — | August 24, 2000 | Socorro | LINEAR | · | 2.3 km | MPC · JPL |
| 153043 | 2000 QN_{25} | — | August 26, 2000 | Socorro | LINEAR | · | 3.8 km | MPC · JPL |
| 153044 | 2000 QG_{47} | — | August 24, 2000 | Socorro | LINEAR | · | 2.0 km | MPC · JPL |
| 153045 | 2000 QV_{53} | — | August 25, 2000 | Socorro | LINEAR | · | 2.2 km | MPC · JPL |
| 153046 | 2000 QE_{66} | — | August 28, 2000 | Socorro | LINEAR | · | 4.6 km | MPC · JPL |
| 153047 | 2000 QW_{68} | — | August 29, 2000 | Bisei SG Center | BATTeRS | · | 2.3 km | MPC · JPL |
| 153048 | 2000 QN_{75} | — | August 24, 2000 | Socorro | LINEAR | · | 1.3 km | MPC · JPL |
| 153049 | 2000 QK_{77} | — | August 24, 2000 | Socorro | LINEAR | · | 2.3 km | MPC · JPL |
| 153050 | 2000 QL_{95} | — | August 26, 2000 | Socorro | LINEAR | · | 3.8 km | MPC · JPL |
| 153051 | 2000 QV_{95} | — | August 26, 2000 | Socorro | LINEAR | · | 2.0 km | MPC · JPL |
| 153052 | 2000 QO_{98} | — | August 28, 2000 | Socorro | LINEAR | · | 2.5 km | MPC · JPL |
| 153053 | 2000 QQ_{100} | — | August 28, 2000 | Socorro | LINEAR | (5) | 2.5 km | MPC · JPL |
| 153054 | 2000 QF_{117} | — | August 25, 2000 | Socorro | LINEAR | H | 940 m | MPC · JPL |
| 153055 | 2000 QZ_{125} | — | August 31, 2000 | Socorro | LINEAR | · | 4.1 km | MPC · JPL |
| 153056 | 2000 QN_{138} | — | August 31, 2000 | Socorro | LINEAR | · | 3.0 km | MPC · JPL |
| 153057 | 2000 QE_{146} | — | August 31, 2000 | Socorro | LINEAR | · | 2.9 km | MPC · JPL |
| 153058 | 2000 QA_{152} | — | August 26, 2000 | Socorro | LINEAR | · | 5.1 km | MPC · JPL |
| 153059 | 2000 QE_{158} | — | August 31, 2000 | Socorro | LINEAR | · | 2.4 km | MPC · JPL |
| 153060 | 2000 QU_{166} | — | August 31, 2000 | Socorro | LINEAR | · | 1.8 km | MPC · JPL |
| 153061 | 2000 QY_{168} | — | August 31, 2000 | Socorro | LINEAR | · | 4.0 km | MPC · JPL |
| 153062 | 2000 QD_{172} | — | August 31, 2000 | Socorro | LINEAR | GEF | 1.9 km | MPC · JPL |
| 153063 | 2000 QC_{176} | — | August 31, 2000 | Socorro | LINEAR | · | 2.5 km | MPC · JPL |
| 153064 | 2000 QG_{179} | — | August 31, 2000 | Socorro | LINEAR | DOR | 4.5 km | MPC · JPL |
| 153065 | 2000 QO_{186} | — | August 26, 2000 | Socorro | LINEAR | EUN | 2.0 km | MPC · JPL |
| 153066 | 2000 QT_{187} | — | August 26, 2000 | Socorro | LINEAR | · | 3.8 km | MPC · JPL |
| 153067 | 2000 QG_{195} | — | August 26, 2000 | Socorro | LINEAR | · | 3.6 km | MPC · JPL |
| 153068 | 2000 QE_{201} | — | August 29, 2000 | Socorro | LINEAR | · | 1.7 km | MPC · JPL |
| 153069 | 2000 QQ_{202} | — | August 29, 2000 | Socorro | LINEAR | · | 2.0 km | MPC · JPL |
| 153070 | 2000 QX_{206} | — | August 31, 2000 | Socorro | LINEAR | · | 3.9 km | MPC · JPL |
| 153071 | 2000 QW_{207} | — | August 31, 2000 | Socorro | LINEAR | MIS | 3.1 km | MPC · JPL |
| 153072 | 2000 QK_{210} | — | August 31, 2000 | Socorro | LINEAR | MIS | 3.3 km | MPC · JPL |
| 153073 | 2000 QS_{212} | — | August 31, 2000 | Socorro | LINEAR | · | 3.0 km | MPC · JPL |
| 153074 | 2000 QV_{214} | — | August 31, 2000 | Socorro | LINEAR | · | 3.0 km | MPC · JPL |
| 153075 | 2000 QR_{222} | — | August 21, 2000 | Anderson Mesa | LONEOS | · | 2.5 km | MPC · JPL |
| 153076 | 2000 QO_{228} | — | August 31, 2000 | Socorro | LINEAR | · | 3.7 km | MPC · JPL |
| 153077 | 2000 QY_{231} | — | August 29, 2000 | Socorro | LINEAR | HNS | 2.2 km | MPC · JPL |
| 153078 Giovale | 2000 QW_{245} | Giovale | August 26, 2000 | Cerro Tololo | Millis, R. | · | 1.8 km | MPC · JPL |
| 153079 | 2000 RF_{4} | — | September 1, 2000 | Socorro | LINEAR | EUN | 2.2 km | MPC · JPL |
| 153080 | 2000 RJ_{8} | — | September 1, 2000 | Socorro | LINEAR | H | 890 m | MPC · JPL |
| 153081 | 2000 RU_{19} | — | September 1, 2000 | Socorro | LINEAR | · | 2.1 km | MPC · JPL |
| 153082 | 2000 RB_{22} | — | September 1, 2000 | Socorro | LINEAR | · | 1.6 km | MPC · JPL |
| 153083 | 2000 RH_{28} | — | September 1, 2000 | Socorro | LINEAR | L5 | 20 km | MPC · JPL |
| 153084 | 2000 RQ_{29} | — | September 1, 2000 | Socorro | LINEAR | EUN | 2.5 km | MPC · JPL |
| 153085 | 2000 RU_{38} | — | September 4, 2000 | Socorro | LINEAR | · | 2.2 km | MPC · JPL |
| 153086 | 2000 RX_{41} | — | September 3, 2000 | Socorro | LINEAR | · | 3.9 km | MPC · JPL |
| 153087 | 2000 RG_{43} | — | September 3, 2000 | Socorro | LINEAR | H | 1.1 km | MPC · JPL |
| 153088 | 2000 RP_{45} | — | September 3, 2000 | Socorro | LINEAR | RAF | 2.2 km | MPC · JPL |
| 153089 | 2000 RL_{49} | — | September 5, 2000 | Socorro | LINEAR | · | 4.5 km | MPC · JPL |
| 153090 | 2000 RL_{54} | — | September 3, 2000 | Socorro | LINEAR | · | 4.8 km | MPC · JPL |
| 153091 | 2000 RN_{58} | — | September 7, 2000 | Kitt Peak | Spacewatch | · | 3.9 km | MPC · JPL |
| 153092 | 2000 RU_{74} | — | September 3, 2000 | Socorro | LINEAR | · | 3.4 km | MPC · JPL |
| 153093 | 2000 RP_{76} | — | September 4, 2000 | Socorro | LINEAR | · | 2.9 km | MPC · JPL |
| 153094 | 2000 RB_{93} | — | September 3, 2000 | Socorro | LINEAR | · | 3.2 km | MPC · JPL |
| 153095 | 2000 RY_{93} | — | September 4, 2000 | Anderson Mesa | LONEOS | MRX | 1.9 km | MPC · JPL |
| 153096 | 2000 SZ_{2} | — | September 19, 2000 | Kitt Peak | Spacewatch | · | 2.0 km | MPC · JPL |
| 153097 | 2000 SQ_{3} | — | September 20, 2000 | Socorro | LINEAR | MAR | 2.0 km | MPC · JPL |
| 153098 | 2000 ST_{4} | — | September 20, 2000 | Socorro | LINEAR | H | 1.0 km | MPC · JPL |
| 153099 | 2000 SY_{10} | — | September 22, 2000 | Socorro | LINEAR | H | 960 m | MPC · JPL |
| 153100 | 2000 SN_{11} | — | September 24, 2000 | Socorro | LINEAR | H | 800 m | MPC · JPL |

== 153101–153200 ==
back to top

| Designation | | | Discovery | | | Properties | | Ref |
| Permanent | Provisional | Named after | Date | Site | Discoverer(s) | Category | Diam. | Ref |
|---|---|---|---|---|---|---|---|---|
| 153101 | 2000 SW_{15} | — | September 23, 2000 | Socorro | LINEAR | · | 2.0 km | MPC · JPL |
| 153102 | 2000 SB_{30} | — | September 24, 2000 | Socorro | LINEAR | (5) | 1.6 km | MPC · JPL |
| 153103 | 2000 ST_{32} | — | September 24, 2000 | Socorro | LINEAR | · | 2.6 km | MPC · JPL |
| 153104 | 2000 SG_{42} | — | September 26, 2000 | Ondřejov | P. Kušnirák | · | 2.6 km | MPC · JPL |
| 153105 | 2000 SZ_{42} | — | September 25, 2000 | Črni Vrh | Mikuž, H. | · | 4.3 km | MPC · JPL |
| 153106 | 2000 SF_{44} | — | September 24, 2000 | Socorro | LINEAR | H | 950 m | MPC · JPL |
| 153107 | 2000 SY_{55} | — | September 24, 2000 | Socorro | LINEAR | L5 | 13 km | MPC · JPL |
| 153108 | 2000 SJ_{56} | — | September 24, 2000 | Socorro | LINEAR | EUN | 2.0 km | MPC · JPL |
| 153109 | 2000 SN_{62} | — | September 24, 2000 | Socorro | LINEAR | · | 2.7 km | MPC · JPL |
| 153110 | 2000 SB_{66} | — | September 24, 2000 | Socorro | LINEAR | · | 2.7 km | MPC · JPL |
| 153111 | 2000 SR_{67} | — | September 24, 2000 | Socorro | LINEAR | · | 1.5 km | MPC · JPL |
| 153112 | 2000 SH_{69} | — | September 24, 2000 | Socorro | LINEAR | (18466) | 4.6 km | MPC · JPL |
| 153113 | 2000 SH_{70} | — | September 24, 2000 | Socorro | LINEAR | · | 2.2 km | MPC · JPL |
| 153114 | 2000 SF_{72} | — | September 24, 2000 | Socorro | LINEAR | · | 3.7 km | MPC · JPL |
| 153115 | 2000 SK_{72} | — | September 24, 2000 | Socorro | LINEAR | · | 2.7 km | MPC · JPL |
| 153116 | 2000 SB_{74} | — | September 24, 2000 | Socorro | LINEAR | DOR | 4.7 km | MPC · JPL |
| 153117 | 2000 SA_{78} | — | September 24, 2000 | Socorro | LINEAR | · | 3.3 km | MPC · JPL |
| 153118 | 2000 SA_{83} | — | September 24, 2000 | Socorro | LINEAR | · | 2.9 km | MPC · JPL |
| 153119 | 2000 SN_{86} | — | September 24, 2000 | Socorro | LINEAR | EUN | 2.0 km | MPC · JPL |
| 153120 | 2000 SR_{90} | — | September 22, 2000 | Socorro | LINEAR | · | 3.1 km | MPC · JPL |
| 153121 | 2000 SM_{95} | — | September 23, 2000 | Socorro | LINEAR | GEF | 2.3 km | MPC · JPL |
| 153122 | 2000 SA_{97} | — | September 23, 2000 | Socorro | LINEAR | L5 | 15 km | MPC · JPL |
| 153123 | 2000 SW_{98} | — | September 23, 2000 | Socorro | LINEAR | · | 2.8 km | MPC · JPL |
| 153124 | 2000 SR_{102} | — | September 24, 2000 | Socorro | LINEAR | · | 2.3 km | MPC · JPL |
| 153125 | 2000 SG_{111} | — | September 24, 2000 | Socorro | LINEAR | · | 2.3 km | MPC · JPL |
| 153126 | 2000 SQ_{128} | — | September 24, 2000 | Socorro | LINEAR | · | 3.9 km | MPC · JPL |
| 153127 | 2000 SV_{130} | — | September 22, 2000 | Socorro | LINEAR | MAR | 2.3 km | MPC · JPL |
| 153128 | 2000 SF_{132} | — | September 22, 2000 | Socorro | LINEAR | MAR | 2.4 km | MPC · JPL |
| 153129 | 2000 SH_{134} | — | September 23, 2000 | Socorro | LINEAR | · | 3.5 km | MPC · JPL |
| 153130 | 2000 SO_{141} | — | September 23, 2000 | Socorro | LINEAR | EUN | 2.0 km | MPC · JPL |
| 153131 | 2000 SK_{144} | — | September 24, 2000 | Socorro | LINEAR | · | 3.4 km | MPC · JPL |
| 153132 | 2000 SW_{161} | — | September 20, 2000 | Haleakala | NEAT | · | 4.5 km | MPC · JPL |
| 153133 | 2000 SC_{172} | — | September 27, 2000 | Socorro | LINEAR | · | 6.6 km | MPC · JPL |
| 153134 | 2000 SD_{174} | — | September 28, 2000 | Socorro | LINEAR | ADE | 4.7 km | MPC · JPL |
| 153135 | 2000 ST_{184} | — | September 20, 2000 | Haleakala | NEAT | · | 2.9 km | MPC · JPL |
| 153136 | 2000 SW_{185} | — | September 21, 2000 | Kitt Peak | Spacewatch | · | 2.1 km | MPC · JPL |
| 153137 | 2000 SB_{191} | — | September 24, 2000 | Socorro | LINEAR | (5) | 1.8 km | MPC · JPL |
| 153138 | 2000 SW_{191} | — | September 24, 2000 | Socorro | LINEAR | · | 2.0 km | MPC · JPL |
| 153139 | 2000 SM_{197} | — | September 24, 2000 | Socorro | LINEAR | · | 2.2 km | MPC · JPL |
| 153140 | 2000 SC_{203} | — | September 24, 2000 | Socorro | LINEAR | · | 2.7 km | MPC · JPL |
| 153141 | 2000 SP_{203} | — | September 24, 2000 | Socorro | LINEAR | L5 | 17 km | MPC · JPL |
| 153142 | 2000 SG_{205} | — | September 24, 2000 | Socorro | LINEAR | · | 2.4 km | MPC · JPL |
| 153143 | 2000 ST_{215} | — | September 26, 2000 | Socorro | LINEAR | · | 1.7 km | MPC · JPL |
| 153144 | 2000 SY_{230} | — | September 28, 2000 | Socorro | LINEAR | slow | 2.5 km | MPC · JPL |
| 153145 | 2000 SQ_{239} | — | September 28, 2000 | Socorro | LINEAR | · | 2.5 km | MPC · JPL |
| 153146 | 2000 SQ_{243} | — | September 24, 2000 | Socorro | LINEAR | · | 3.0 km | MPC · JPL |
| 153147 | 2000 SW_{243} | — | September 24, 2000 | Socorro | LINEAR | AGN | 1.8 km | MPC · JPL |
| 153148 | 2000 SH_{248} | — | September 24, 2000 | Socorro | LINEAR | · | 2.4 km | MPC · JPL |
| 153149 | 2000 SE_{250} | — | September 24, 2000 | Socorro | LINEAR | · | 2.3 km | MPC · JPL |
| 153150 | 2000 SK_{254} | — | September 24, 2000 | Socorro | LINEAR | · | 2.2 km | MPC · JPL |
| 153151 | 2000 SV_{266} | — | September 27, 2000 | Socorro | LINEAR | · | 2.4 km | MPC · JPL |
| 153152 | 2000 SE_{276} | — | September 28, 2000 | Socorro | LINEAR | · | 3.3 km | MPC · JPL |
| 153153 | 2000 SP_{288} | — | September 27, 2000 | Socorro | LINEAR | · | 3.3 km | MPC · JPL |
| 153154 | 2000 SF_{290} | — | September 27, 2000 | Socorro | LINEAR | MRX | 1.8 km | MPC · JPL |
| 153155 | 2000 SO_{298} | — | September 28, 2000 | Socorro | LINEAR | L5 | 15 km | MPC · JPL |
| 153156 | 2000 SM_{301} | — | September 28, 2000 | Socorro | LINEAR | · | 3.2 km | MPC · JPL |
| 153157 | 2000 SJ_{307} | — | September 30, 2000 | Socorro | LINEAR | · | 3.3 km | MPC · JPL |
| 153158 | 2000 SN_{309} | — | September 24, 2000 | Socorro | LINEAR | · | 2.7 km | MPC · JPL |
| 153159 | 2000 SA_{311} | — | September 26, 2000 | Socorro | LINEAR | URS | 6.0 km | MPC · JPL |
| 153160 | 2000 SX_{313} | — | September 27, 2000 | Socorro | LINEAR | · | 8.1 km | MPC · JPL |
| 153161 | 2000 SP_{317} | — | September 30, 2000 | Socorro | LINEAR | · | 2.9 km | MPC · JPL |
| 153162 | 2000 SB_{327} | — | September 29, 2000 | Kitt Peak | Spacewatch | · | 2.5 km | MPC · JPL |
| 153163 | 2000 SP_{339} | — | September 25, 2000 | Haleakala | NEAT | PAD | 2.7 km | MPC · JPL |
| 153164 | 2000 TC_{3} | — | October 1, 2000 | Socorro | LINEAR | · | 2.5 km | MPC · JPL |
| 153165 | 2000 TG_{5} | — | October 1, 2000 | Socorro | LINEAR | · | 2.0 km | MPC · JPL |
| 153166 | 2000 TS_{6} | — | October 1, 2000 | Socorro | LINEAR | · | 2.3 km | MPC · JPL |
| 153167 | 2000 TJ_{28} | — | October 3, 2000 | Socorro | LINEAR | · | 2.2 km | MPC · JPL |
| 153168 | 2000 TP_{30} | — | October 2, 2000 | Kitt Peak | Spacewatch | · | 3.0 km | MPC · JPL |
| 153169 | 2000 TK_{36} | — | October 6, 2000 | Anderson Mesa | LONEOS | VER | 5.2 km | MPC · JPL |
| 153170 | 2000 TW_{37} | — | October 1, 2000 | Socorro | LINEAR | GEF | 2.1 km | MPC · JPL |
| 153171 | 2000 TJ_{42} | — | October 1, 2000 | Socorro | LINEAR | · | 1.4 km | MPC · JPL |
| 153172 | 2000 TY_{59} | — | October 2, 2000 | Anderson Mesa | LONEOS | · | 3.4 km | MPC · JPL |
| 153173 | 2000 TJ_{64} | — | October 5, 2000 | Socorro | LINEAR | · | 5.2 km | MPC · JPL |
| 153174 | 2000 TZ_{64} | — | October 1, 2000 | Socorro | LINEAR | · | 2.6 km | MPC · JPL |
| 153175 | 2000 UN_{2} | — | October 24, 2000 | Emerald Lane | L. Ball | · | 5.5 km | MPC · JPL |
| 153176 | 2000 UF_{21} | — | October 24, 2000 | Socorro | LINEAR | · | 3.5 km | MPC · JPL |
| 153177 | 2000 UM_{35} | — | October 24, 2000 | Socorro | LINEAR | · | 2.6 km | MPC · JPL |
| 153178 | 2000 UF_{36} | — | October 24, 2000 | Socorro | LINEAR | · | 2.4 km | MPC · JPL |
| 153179 | 2000 UM_{36} | — | October 24, 2000 | Socorro | LINEAR | · | 4.4 km | MPC · JPL |
| 153180 | 2000 UJ_{37} | — | October 24, 2000 | Socorro | LINEAR | · | 3.1 km | MPC · JPL |
| 153181 | 2000 UZ_{41} | — | October 24, 2000 | Socorro | LINEAR | · | 3.0 km | MPC · JPL |
| 153182 | 2000 UL_{46} | — | October 24, 2000 | Socorro | LINEAR | · | 4.5 km | MPC · JPL |
| 153183 | 2000 UY_{58} | — | October 25, 2000 | Socorro | LINEAR | · | 4.4 km | MPC · JPL |
| 153184 | 2000 UQ_{65} | — | October 25, 2000 | Socorro | LINEAR | · | 3.4 km | MPC · JPL |
| 153185 | 2000 UJ_{73} | — | October 26, 2000 | Socorro | LINEAR | ADE | 5.8 km | MPC · JPL |
| 153186 | 2000 UX_{76} | — | October 24, 2000 | Socorro | LINEAR | · | 4.0 km | MPC · JPL |
| 153187 | 2000 UD_{82} | — | October 25, 2000 | Socorro | LINEAR | · | 4.6 km | MPC · JPL |
| 153188 | 2000 UO_{83} | — | October 31, 2000 | Socorro | LINEAR | · | 3.0 km | MPC · JPL |
| 153189 | 2000 US_{89} | — | October 31, 2000 | Socorro | LINEAR | RAF | 1.9 km | MPC · JPL |
| 153190 | 2000 UU_{89} | — | October 31, 2000 | Socorro | LINEAR | · | 4.3 km | MPC · JPL |
| 153191 | 2000 US_{101} | — | October 25, 2000 | Socorro | LINEAR | · | 2.1 km | MPC · JPL |
| 153192 | 2000 VP_{1} | — | November 1, 2000 | Socorro | LINEAR | · | 2.7 km | MPC · JPL |
| 153193 | 2000 VJ_{42} | — | November 1, 2000 | Socorro | LINEAR | · | 1.7 km | MPC · JPL |
| 153194 | 2000 VC_{49} | — | November 2, 2000 | Socorro | LINEAR | · | 3.4 km | MPC · JPL |
| 153195 | 2000 WB_{1} | — | November 16, 2000 | Socorro | LINEAR | APO +1km | 1.3 km | MPC · JPL |
| 153196 | 2000 WC_{16} | — | November 21, 2000 | Socorro | LINEAR | · | 2.8 km | MPC · JPL |
| 153197 | 2000 WC_{21} | — | November 25, 2000 | Kitt Peak | Spacewatch | · | 3.7 km | MPC · JPL |
| 153198 | 2000 WC_{45} | — | November 21, 2000 | Socorro | LINEAR | · | 2.8 km | MPC · JPL |
| 153199 | 2000 WU_{79} | — | November 20, 2000 | Socorro | LINEAR | (5) | 2.5 km | MPC · JPL |
| 153200 | 2000 WR_{81} | — | November 20, 2000 | Socorro | LINEAR | · | 2.7 km | MPC · JPL |

== 153201–153300 ==
back to top

| Designation | | | Discovery | | | Properties | | Ref |
| Permanent | Provisional | Named after | Date | Site | Discoverer(s) | Category | Diam. | Ref |
|---|---|---|---|---|---|---|---|---|
| 153201 | 2000 WO_{107} | — | November 29, 2000 | Socorro | LINEAR | ATE · PHA | 510 m | MPC · JPL |
| 153202 | 2000 WJ_{109} | — | November 20, 2000 | Socorro | LINEAR | · | 2.5 km | MPC · JPL |
| 153203 | 2000 WF_{122} | — | November 29, 2000 | Socorro | LINEAR | THM | 3.1 km | MPC · JPL |
| 153204 | 2000 WR_{129} | — | November 19, 2000 | Kitt Peak | Spacewatch | HOF | 4.6 km | MPC · JPL |
| 153205 | 2000 WV_{159} | — | November 20, 2000 | Anderson Mesa | LONEOS | · | 2.9 km | MPC · JPL |
| 153206 | 2000 WH_{163} | — | November 21, 2000 | Socorro | LINEAR | · | 3.5 km | MPC · JPL |
| 153207 | 2000 XX | — | December 1, 2000 | Haleakala | NEAT | · | 5.0 km | MPC · JPL |
| 153208 | 2000 XP_{3} | — | December 1, 2000 | Socorro | LINEAR | EUN | 3.4 km | MPC · JPL |
| 153209 | 2000 XL_{9} | — | December 1, 2000 | Socorro | LINEAR | · | 6.2 km | MPC · JPL |
| 153210 | 2000 XQ_{14} | — | December 4, 2000 | Kitt Peak | Spacewatch | · | 4.2 km | MPC · JPL |
| 153211 | 2000 XJ_{16} | — | December 1, 2000 | Socorro | LINEAR | · | 3.4 km | MPC · JPL |
| 153212 | 2000 XK_{41} | — | December 5, 2000 | Socorro | LINEAR | · | 3.5 km | MPC · JPL |
| 153213 | 2000 XX_{44} | — | December 8, 2000 | Socorro | LINEAR | H | 1.1 km | MPC · JPL |
| 153214 | 2000 XP_{51} | — | December 6, 2000 | Socorro | LINEAR | GEF | 2.3 km | MPC · JPL |
| 153215 | 2000 YR_{8} | — | December 17, 2000 | Kitt Peak | Spacewatch | · | 3.7 km | MPC · JPL |
| 153216 | 2000 YR_{19} | — | December 28, 2000 | Fair Oaks Ranch | J. V. McClusky | · | 6.2 km | MPC · JPL |
| 153217 | 2000 YX_{19} | — | December 26, 2000 | Haleakala | NEAT | · | 3.8 km | MPC · JPL |
| 153218 | 2000 YU_{23} | — | December 28, 2000 | Kitt Peak | Spacewatch | HYG | 4.2 km | MPC · JPL |
| 153219 | 2000 YM_{29} | — | December 27, 2000 | Anderson Mesa | LONEOS | AMO +1km | 1.3 km | MPC · JPL |
| 153220 | 2000 YN_{29} | — | December 28, 2000 | Kitt Peak | Spacewatch | APO +1km · PHA | 1.2 km | MPC · JPL |
| 153221 | 2000 YU_{37} | — | December 30, 2000 | Socorro | LINEAR | EOS | 3.7 km | MPC · JPL |
| 153222 | 2000 YD_{43} | — | December 30, 2000 | Socorro | LINEAR | · | 4.2 km | MPC · JPL |
| 153223 | 2000 YR_{47} | — | December 30, 2000 | Socorro | LINEAR | · | 6.2 km | MPC · JPL |
| 153224 | 2000 YR_{48} | — | December 30, 2000 | Socorro | LINEAR | · | 3.7 km | MPC · JPL |
| 153225 | 2000 YH_{52} | — | December 30, 2000 | Socorro | LINEAR | · | 3.6 km | MPC · JPL |
| 153226 | 2000 YZ_{57} | — | December 30, 2000 | Socorro | LINEAR | · | 5.6 km | MPC · JPL |
| 153227 | 2000 YL_{58} | — | December 30, 2000 | Socorro | LINEAR | EOS | 3.2 km | MPC · JPL |
| 153228 | 2000 YJ_{59} | — | December 30, 2000 | Socorro | LINEAR | · | 4.7 km | MPC · JPL |
| 153229 | 2000 YE_{85} | — | December 30, 2000 | Socorro | LINEAR | · | 4.5 km | MPC · JPL |
| 153230 | 2000 YS_{89} | — | December 30, 2000 | Socorro | LINEAR | · | 3.4 km | MPC · JPL |
| 153231 | 2000 YV_{98} | — | December 30, 2000 | Socorro | LINEAR | EMA | 5.4 km | MPC · JPL |
| 153232 | 2000 YG_{111} | — | December 30, 2000 | Socorro | LINEAR | · | 4.2 km | MPC · JPL |
| 153233 | 2000 YP_{112} | — | December 30, 2000 | Socorro | LINEAR | · | 3.6 km | MPC · JPL |
| 153234 | 2000 YV_{114} | — | December 30, 2000 | Socorro | LINEAR | · | 5.2 km | MPC · JPL |
| 153235 | 2000 YL_{133} | — | December 31, 2000 | Anderson Mesa | LONEOS | T_{j} (2.96) | 4.9 km | MPC · JPL |
| 153236 | 2000 YF_{138} | — | December 26, 2000 | Bohyunsan | Bohyunsan | · | 3.1 km | MPC · JPL |
| 153237 | 2001 AY_{1} | — | January 3, 2001 | Desert Beaver | W. K. Y. Yeung | · | 5.8 km | MPC · JPL |
| 153238 | 2001 AG_{27} | — | January 5, 2001 | Socorro | LINEAR | · | 3.6 km | MPC · JPL |
| 153239 | 2001 AK_{37} | — | January 5, 2001 | Socorro | LINEAR | TIR | 5.1 km | MPC · JPL |
| 153240 | 2001 AG_{39} | — | January 2, 2001 | Kitt Peak | Spacewatch | URS | 7.3 km | MPC · JPL |
| 153241 | 2001 AS_{46} | — | January 15, 2001 | Socorro | LINEAR | EUP | 5.7 km | MPC · JPL |
| 153242 | 2001 AO_{47} | — | January 15, 2001 | Socorro | LINEAR | H | 1.3 km | MPC · JPL |
| 153243 | 2001 AU_{47} | — | January 15, 2001 | Socorro | LINEAR | APO +1km | 1.1 km | MPC · JPL |
| 153244 | 2001 AQ_{50} | — | January 14, 2001 | Kitt Peak | Spacewatch | · | 5.8 km | MPC · JPL |
| 153245 | 2001 BK | — | January 17, 2001 | Oizumi | T. Kobayashi | HYG | 4.7 km | MPC · JPL |
| 153246 | 2001 BK_{1} | — | January 17, 2001 | Socorro | LINEAR | · | 5.1 km | MPC · JPL |
| 153247 | 2001 BT_{1} | — | January 16, 2001 | Bergisch Gladbach | W. Bickel | HYG | 4.5 km | MPC · JPL |
| 153248 | 2001 BU_{6} | — | January 19, 2001 | Socorro | LINEAR | · | 6.0 km | MPC · JPL |
| 153249 | 2001 BW_{15} | — | January 17, 2001 | Socorro | LINEAR | APO +1km | 3.2 km | MPC · JPL |
| 153250 | 2001 BL_{21} | — | January 19, 2001 | Socorro | LINEAR | EOS | 3.8 km | MPC · JPL |
| 153251 | 2001 BR_{22} | — | January 20, 2001 | Socorro | LINEAR | EOS | 2.9 km | MPC · JPL |
| 153252 | 2001 BQ_{26} | — | January 20, 2001 | Socorro | LINEAR | · | 4.8 km | MPC · JPL |
| 153253 | 2001 BZ_{45} | — | January 21, 2001 | Socorro | LINEAR | · | 4.6 km | MPC · JPL |
| 153254 | 2001 BF_{47} | — | January 21, 2001 | Socorro | LINEAR | EOS | 3.3 km | MPC · JPL |
| 153255 | 2001 BQ_{53} | — | January 17, 2001 | Haleakala | NEAT | · | 6.5 km | MPC · JPL |
| 153256 | 2001 BR_{57} | — | January 20, 2001 | Haleakala | NEAT | · | 6.3 km | MPC · JPL |
| 153257 | 2001 BK_{59} | — | January 21, 2001 | Socorro | LINEAR | · | 5.8 km | MPC · JPL |
| 153258 | 2001 BZ_{63} | — | January 29, 2001 | Socorro | LINEAR | · | 4.4 km | MPC · JPL |
| 153259 | 2001 BY_{66} | — | January 29, 2001 | Socorro | LINEAR | · | 5.0 km | MPC · JPL |
| 153260 | 2001 BM_{67} | — | January 31, 2001 | Socorro | LINEAR | · | 6.9 km | MPC · JPL |
| 153261 | 2001 BS_{70} | — | January 29, 2001 | Socorro | LINEAR | · | 5.7 km | MPC · JPL |
| 153262 | 2001 CN_{5} | — | February 1, 2001 | Socorro | LINEAR | EOS | 4.0 km | MPC · JPL |
| 153263 | 2001 CD_{12} | — | February 1, 2001 | Socorro | LINEAR | · | 5.2 km | MPC · JPL |
| 153264 | 2001 CT_{14} | — | February 1, 2001 | Socorro | LINEAR | · | 3.8 km | MPC · JPL |
| 153265 | 2001 CF_{19} | — | February 2, 2001 | Socorro | LINEAR | · | 5.9 km | MPC · JPL |
| 153266 | 2001 CH_{21} | — | February 11, 2001 | Eskridge | G. Hug | · | 5.7 km | MPC · JPL |
| 153267 | 2001 CB_{32} | — | February 6, 2001 | Socorro | LINEAR | APO +1km | 980 m | MPC · JPL |
| 153268 | 2001 CV_{32} | — | February 13, 2001 | Socorro | LINEAR | T_{j} (2.99) | 7.7 km | MPC · JPL |
| 153269 | 2001 CR_{33} | — | February 13, 2001 | Socorro | LINEAR | · | 7.7 km | MPC · JPL |
| 153270 | 2001 CW_{33} | — | February 13, 2001 | Socorro | LINEAR | AEG | 5.7 km | MPC · JPL |
| 153271 | 2001 CL_{42} | — | February 15, 2001 | Socorro | LINEAR | APO +1km | 2.4 km | MPC · JPL |
| 153272 | 2001 CM_{45} | — | February 15, 2001 | Socorro | LINEAR | THB | 6.3 km | MPC · JPL |
| 153273 | 2001 CQ_{46} | — | February 13, 2001 | Socorro | LINEAR | · | 4.4 km | MPC · JPL |
| 153274 | 2001 CU_{49} | — | February 3, 2001 | Socorro | LINEAR | · | 7.4 km | MPC · JPL |
| 153275 | 2001 DA_{10} | — | February 16, 2001 | Socorro | LINEAR | VER | 4.8 km | MPC · JPL |
| 153276 | 2001 DC_{32} | — | February 17, 2001 | Socorro | LINEAR | VER | 5.5 km | MPC · JPL |
| 153277 | 2001 DY_{40} | — | February 19, 2001 | Socorro | LINEAR | · | 5.6 km | MPC · JPL |
| 153278 | 2001 DH_{49} | — | February 16, 2001 | Socorro | LINEAR | · | 5.5 km | MPC · JPL |
| 153279 | 2001 DY_{50} | — | February 16, 2001 | Socorro | LINEAR | EOS | 3.2 km | MPC · JPL |
| 153280 | 2001 DB_{52} | — | February 16, 2001 | Socorro | LINEAR | T_{j} (2.99) · EUP | 7.4 km | MPC · JPL |
| 153281 | 2001 DF_{56} | — | February 16, 2001 | Kitt Peak | Spacewatch | · | 6.6 km | MPC · JPL |
| 153282 | 2001 DE_{69} | — | February 19, 2001 | Socorro | LINEAR | · | 6.3 km | MPC · JPL |
| 153283 | 2001 DY_{91} | — | February 20, 2001 | Kitt Peak | Spacewatch | HYG | 5.4 km | MPC · JPL |
| 153284 Frieman | 2001 DU_{109} | Frieman | February 21, 2001 | Apache Point | SDSS | · | 4.5 km | MPC · JPL |
| 153285 | 2001 DD_{111} | — | February 16, 2001 | Socorro | LINEAR | · | 5.1 km | MPC · JPL |
| 153286 | 2001 EL_{7} | — | March 2, 2001 | Anderson Mesa | LONEOS | · | 5.7 km | MPC · JPL |
| 153287 | 2001 EY_{24} | — | March 15, 2001 | Socorro | LINEAR | · | 6.5 km | MPC · JPL |
| 153288 | 2001 FG_{4} | — | March 16, 2001 | Kitt Peak | Spacewatch | · | 1.4 km | MPC · JPL |
| 153289 Rebeccawatson | 2001 FB_{10} | Rebeccawatson | March 22, 2001 | Junk Bond | D. Healy | SYL · CYB | 8.2 km | MPC · JPL |
| 153290 | 2001 FH_{11} | — | March 19, 2001 | Anderson Mesa | LONEOS | · | 7.4 km | MPC · JPL |
| 153291 | 2001 FW_{19} | — | March 19, 2001 | Anderson Mesa | LONEOS | · | 1.3 km | MPC · JPL |
| 153292 | 2001 FE_{27} | — | March 18, 2001 | Socorro | LINEAR | · | 7.7 km | MPC · JPL |
| 153293 | 2001 FV_{62} | — | March 19, 2001 | Socorro | LINEAR | · | 7.3 km | MPC · JPL |
| 153294 | 2001 FJ_{95} | — | March 16, 2001 | Socorro | LINEAR | (3025) | 6.9 km | MPC · JPL |
| 153295 | 2001 FB_{107} | — | March 18, 2001 | Anderson Mesa | LONEOS | HYG | 4.9 km | MPC · JPL |
| 153296 | 2001 FF_{108} | — | March 18, 2001 | Socorro | LINEAR | · | 5.4 km | MPC · JPL |
| 153297 | 2001 FN_{109} | — | March 18, 2001 | Socorro | LINEAR | · | 5.3 km | MPC · JPL |
| 153298 Paulmyers | 2001 FC_{122} | Paulmyers | March 29, 2001 | Junk Bond | D. Healy | HYG | 4.9 km | MPC · JPL |
| 153299 | 2001 FB_{154} | — | March 26, 2001 | Haleakala | NEAT | · | 5.8 km | MPC · JPL |
| 153300 | 2001 FD_{159} | — | March 29, 2001 | Anderson Mesa | LONEOS | THM | 4.3 km | MPC · JPL |

== 153301–153400 ==
back to top

| Designation | | | Discovery | | | Properties | | Ref |
| Permanent | Provisional | Named after | Date | Site | Discoverer(s) | Category | Diam. | Ref |
|---|---|---|---|---|---|---|---|---|
| 153301 Alissamearle | 2001 FR_{183} | Alissamearle | March 25, 2001 | Kitt Peak | M. W. Buie | · | 4.4 km | MPC · JPL |
| 153302 | 2001 FS_{186} | — | March 18, 2001 | Anderson Mesa | LONEOS | · | 6.4 km | MPC · JPL |
| 153303 | 2001 HC_{14} | — | April 23, 2001 | Desert Beaver | W. K. Y. Yeung | · | 1.6 km | MPC · JPL |
| 153304 | 2001 HG_{61} | — | April 24, 2001 | Kitt Peak | Spacewatch | · | 1.2 km | MPC · JPL |
| 153305 | 2001 HV_{62} | — | April 26, 2001 | Anderson Mesa | LONEOS | · | 1.8 km | MPC · JPL |
| 153306 | 2001 JL_{1} | — | May 11, 2001 | Haleakala | NEAT | AMO +1km | 1.6 km | MPC · JPL |
| 153307 | 2001 KF_{10} | — | May 18, 2001 | Socorro | LINEAR | · | 1.6 km | MPC · JPL |
| 153308 | 2001 KE_{17} | — | May 18, 2001 | Socorro | LINEAR | · | 2.8 km | MPC · JPL |
| 153309 | 2001 KB_{68} | — | May 28, 2001 | Haleakala | NEAT | · | 2.9 km | MPC · JPL |
| 153310 | 2001 LZ | — | June 13, 2001 | Socorro | LINEAR | · | 1.9 km | MPC · JPL |
| 153311 | 2001 MG_{1} | — | June 18, 2001 | Palomar | NEAT | APO +1km · PHA | 1.2 km | MPC · JPL |
| 153312 | 2001 MK_{14} | — | June 28, 2001 | Anderson Mesa | LONEOS | · | 1.5 km | MPC · JPL |
| 153313 | 2001 MF_{22} | — | June 28, 2001 | Haleakala | NEAT | · | 1.3 km | MPC · JPL |
| 153314 | 2001 MR_{23} | — | June 27, 2001 | Haleakala | NEAT | · | 1.7 km | MPC · JPL |
| 153315 | 2001 NH_{6} | — | July 10, 2001 | Palomar | NEAT | APO | 440 m | MPC · JPL |
| 153316 | 2001 NL_{8} | — | July 14, 2001 | Palomar | NEAT | · | 1.8 km | MPC · JPL |
| 153317 | 2001 NM_{21} | — | July 14, 2001 | Palomar | NEAT | · | 2.1 km | MPC · JPL |
| 153318 | 2001 OJ_{6} | — | July 17, 2001 | Anderson Mesa | LONEOS | · | 1.7 km | MPC · JPL |
| 153319 | 2001 OT_{9} | — | July 17, 2001 | Haleakala | NEAT | · | 1.4 km | MPC · JPL |
| 153320 | 2001 OR_{13} | — | July 20, 2001 | Socorro | LINEAR | · | 4.2 km | MPC · JPL |
| 153321 | 2001 OW_{16} | — | July 21, 2001 | San Marcello | M. Tombelli, A. Boattini | · | 1.3 km | MPC · JPL |
| 153322 | 2001 OA_{22} | — | July 21, 2001 | Anderson Mesa | LONEOS | · | 2.7 km | MPC · JPL |
| 153323 | 2001 ON_{25} | — | July 18, 2001 | Haleakala | NEAT | · | 2.0 km | MPC · JPL |
| 153324 | 2001 OB_{28} | — | July 18, 2001 | Palomar | NEAT | · | 1.7 km | MPC · JPL |
| 153325 | 2001 OV_{34} | — | July 19, 2001 | Palomar | NEAT | · | 1.6 km | MPC · JPL |
| 153326 | 2001 OG_{35} | — | July 20, 2001 | Palomar | NEAT | · | 1.3 km | MPC · JPL |
| 153327 | 2001 OM_{36} | — | July 21, 2001 | Kitt Peak | Spacewatch | · | 1.1 km | MPC · JPL |
| 153328 | 2001 OP_{40} | — | July 20, 2001 | Palomar | NEAT | · | 1.3 km | MPC · JPL |
| 153329 | 2001 OM_{41} | — | July 21, 2001 | Palomar | NEAT | · | 2.7 km | MPC · JPL |
| 153330 | 2001 OL_{42} | — | July 22, 2001 | Palomar | NEAT | · | 1.8 km | MPC · JPL |
| 153331 | 2001 OO_{46} | — | July 16, 2001 | Anderson Mesa | LONEOS | · | 1.3 km | MPC · JPL |
| 153332 | 2001 OJ_{47} | — | July 16, 2001 | Anderson Mesa | LONEOS | · | 1.6 km | MPC · JPL |
| 153333 Jeanhugues | 2001 OR_{50} | Jeanhugues | July 25, 2001 | Pises | J.-M. Lopez, J. H. Blanc | NYS | 1.9 km | MPC · JPL |
| 153334 | 2001 OO_{52} | — | July 21, 2001 | Palomar | NEAT | · | 1.4 km | MPC · JPL |
| 153335 | 2001 OL_{60} | — | July 21, 2001 | Haleakala | NEAT | · | 1.6 km | MPC · JPL |
| 153336 | 2001 OF_{61} | — | July 21, 2001 | Haleakala | NEAT | · | 1.5 km | MPC · JPL |
| 153337 | 2001 OP_{63} | — | July 19, 2001 | Haleakala | NEAT | · | 1.3 km | MPC · JPL |
| 153338 | 2001 OY_{70} | — | July 19, 2001 | Palomar | NEAT | · | 1.7 km | MPC · JPL |
| 153339 | 2001 OA_{87} | — | July 29, 2001 | Palomar | NEAT | NYS | 1.7 km | MPC · JPL |
| 153340 | 2001 OQ_{89} | — | July 22, 2001 | Socorro | LINEAR | · | 2.4 km | MPC · JPL |
| 153341 | 2001 OA_{90} | — | July 23, 2001 | Haleakala | NEAT | · | 1.3 km | MPC · JPL |
| 153342 | 2001 OP_{93} | — | July 26, 2001 | Palomar | NEAT | · | 2.5 km | MPC · JPL |
| 153343 | 2001 OE_{104} | — | July 30, 2001 | Socorro | LINEAR | · | 2.6 km | MPC · JPL |
| 153344 | 2001 OR_{106} | — | July 29, 2001 | Socorro | LINEAR | · | 1.7 km | MPC · JPL |
| 153345 | 2001 PW_{1} | — | August 8, 2001 | Haleakala | NEAT | · | 1.7 km | MPC · JPL |
| 153346 | 2001 PD_{2} | — | August 8, 2001 | Haleakala | NEAT | · | 3.1 km | MPC · JPL |
| 153347 | 2001 PT_{2} | — | August 3, 2001 | Haleakala | NEAT | NYS | 2.2 km | MPC · JPL |
| 153348 | 2001 PA_{8} | — | August 10, 2001 | Palomar | NEAT | · | 1.1 km | MPC · JPL |
| 153349 | 2001 PJ_{9} | — | August 10, 2001 | Palomar | NEAT | APO | 660 m | MPC · JPL |
| 153350 | 2001 PJ_{13} | — | August 12, 2001 | Mallorca | Sanchez, S. | MAR | 2.5 km | MPC · JPL |
| 153351 | 2001 PV_{20} | — | August 10, 2001 | Haleakala | NEAT | · | 1.5 km | MPC · JPL |
| 153352 | 2001 PP_{21} | — | August 10, 2001 | Haleakala | NEAT | NYS | 1.6 km | MPC · JPL |
| 153353 | 2001 PW_{22} | — | August 10, 2001 | Haleakala | NEAT | · | 2.3 km | MPC · JPL |
| 153354 | 2001 PF_{23} | — | August 10, 2001 | Haleakala | NEAT | · | 2.3 km | MPC · JPL |
| 153355 | 2001 PQ_{23} | — | August 11, 2001 | Haleakala | NEAT | · | 1.6 km | MPC · JPL |
| 153356 | 2001 PE_{25} | — | August 11, 2001 | Haleakala | NEAT | · | 1.5 km | MPC · JPL |
| 153357 | 2001 PN_{26} | — | August 11, 2001 | Haleakala | NEAT | 3:2 · SHU | 8.7 km | MPC · JPL |
| 153358 | 2001 PB_{53} | — | August 14, 2001 | Haleakala | NEAT | · | 2.2 km | MPC · JPL |
| 153359 | 2001 PE_{53} | — | August 14, 2001 | Haleakala | NEAT | · | 1.4 km | MPC · JPL |
| 153360 | 2001 PK_{55} | — | August 14, 2001 | Haleakala | NEAT | V | 860 m | MPC · JPL |
| 153361 | 2001 PA_{58} | — | August 14, 2001 | Haleakala | NEAT | · | 1.3 km | MPC · JPL |
| 153362 | 2001 PA_{61} | — | August 13, 2001 | Haleakala | NEAT | · | 1.3 km | MPC · JPL |
| 153363 | 2001 PC_{61} | — | August 13, 2001 | Haleakala | NEAT | · | 1.9 km | MPC · JPL |
| 153364 | 2001 QL | — | August 16, 2001 | Reedy Creek | J. Broughton | ERI | 4.8 km | MPC · JPL |
| 153365 | 2001 QQ | — | August 16, 2001 | Socorro | LINEAR | · | 1.7 km | MPC · JPL |
| 153366 | 2001 QB_{1} | — | August 16, 2001 | Socorro | LINEAR | · | 1.7 km | MPC · JPL |
| 153367 | 2001 QJ_{3} | — | August 16, 2001 | Socorro | LINEAR | · | 2.5 km | MPC · JPL |
| 153368 | 2001 QP_{5} | — | August 16, 2001 | Socorro | LINEAR | V | 1.3 km | MPC · JPL |
| 153369 | 2001 QQ_{6} | — | August 16, 2001 | Socorro | LINEAR | · | 1.9 km | MPC · JPL |
| 153370 | 2001 QU_{7} | — | August 16, 2001 | Socorro | LINEAR | (2076) | 1.5 km | MPC · JPL |
| 153371 | 2001 QM_{9} | — | August 16, 2001 | Socorro | LINEAR | · | 2.1 km | MPC · JPL |
| 153372 | 2001 QG_{13} | — | August 16, 2001 | Socorro | LINEAR | · | 2.2 km | MPC · JPL |
| 153373 | 2001 QR_{14} | — | August 16, 2001 | Socorro | LINEAR | · | 3.2 km | MPC · JPL |
| 153374 | 2001 QF_{15} | — | August 16, 2001 | Socorro | LINEAR | · | 1.3 km | MPC · JPL |
| 153375 | 2001 QH_{20} | — | August 16, 2001 | Socorro | LINEAR | · | 1.6 km | MPC · JPL |
| 153376 | 2001 QU_{21} | — | August 16, 2001 | Socorro | LINEAR | · | 3.3 km | MPC · JPL |
| 153377 | 2001 QY_{22} | — | August 16, 2001 | Socorro | LINEAR | · | 1.5 km | MPC · JPL |
| 153378 | 2001 QA_{23} | — | August 16, 2001 | Socorro | LINEAR | · | 2.4 km | MPC · JPL |
| 153379 | 2001 QB_{23} | — | August 16, 2001 | Socorro | LINEAR | · | 1.6 km | MPC · JPL |
| 153380 | 2001 QJ_{24} | — | August 16, 2001 | Socorro | LINEAR | · | 3.2 km | MPC · JPL |
| 153381 | 2001 QU_{24} | — | August 16, 2001 | Socorro | LINEAR | · | 5.0 km | MPC · JPL |
| 153382 | 2001 QO_{27} | — | August 16, 2001 | Socorro | LINEAR | · | 2.1 km | MPC · JPL |
| 153383 | 2001 QS_{29} | — | August 16, 2001 | Socorro | LINEAR | · | 4.5 km | MPC · JPL |
| 153384 | 2001 QW_{37} | — | August 16, 2001 | Socorro | LINEAR | · | 1.3 km | MPC · JPL |
| 153385 | 2001 QT_{41} | — | August 16, 2001 | Socorro | LINEAR | · | 1.4 km | MPC · JPL |
| 153386 | 2001 QT_{50} | — | August 16, 2001 | Socorro | LINEAR | T_{j} (2.98) · 3:2 | 9.2 km | MPC · JPL |
| 153387 | 2001 QR_{52} | — | August 16, 2001 | Socorro | LINEAR | · | 1.2 km | MPC · JPL |
| 153388 | 2001 QA_{56} | — | August 16, 2001 | Socorro | LINEAR | · | 1.0 km | MPC · JPL |
| 153389 | 2001 QK_{56} | — | August 16, 2001 | Socorro | LINEAR | NYS | 1.2 km | MPC · JPL |
| 153390 | 2001 QA_{64} | — | August 16, 2001 | Socorro | LINEAR | · | 1.9 km | MPC · JPL |
| 153391 | 2001 QQ_{74} | — | August 16, 2001 | Socorro | LINEAR | EUN | 3.0 km | MPC · JPL |
| 153392 | 2001 QV_{76} | — | August 16, 2001 | Socorro | LINEAR | V | 2.0 km | MPC · JPL |
| 153393 | 2001 QX_{88} | — | August 19, 2001 | Socorro | LINEAR | PHO | 2.7 km | MPC · JPL |
| 153394 | 2001 QQ_{100} | — | August 23, 2001 | Desert Eagle | W. K. Y. Yeung | · | 2.0 km | MPC · JPL |
| 153395 | 2001 QF_{102} | — | August 19, 2001 | Socorro | LINEAR | PHO | 1.1 km | MPC · JPL |
| 153396 | 2001 QY_{104} | — | August 22, 2001 | Socorro | LINEAR | · | 3.3 km | MPC · JPL |
| 153397 | 2001 QK_{106} | — | August 18, 2001 | Anderson Mesa | LONEOS | · | 2.4 km | MPC · JPL |
| 153398 | 2001 QQ_{108} | — | August 19, 2001 | Eskridge | G. Hug | V | 1.2 km | MPC · JPL |
| 153399 | 2001 QC_{109} | — | August 19, 2001 | Haleakala | NEAT | MAR | 1.7 km | MPC · JPL |
| 153400 | 2001 QB_{116} | — | August 17, 2001 | Socorro | LINEAR | · | 1.8 km | MPC · JPL |

== 153401–153500 ==
back to top

| Designation | | | Discovery | | | Properties | | Ref |
| Permanent | Provisional | Named after | Date | Site | Discoverer(s) | Category | Diam. | Ref |
|---|---|---|---|---|---|---|---|---|
| 153401 | 2001 QG_{119} | — | August 17, 2001 | Socorro | LINEAR | V | 1.2 km | MPC · JPL |
| 153402 | 2001 QH_{120} | — | August 18, 2001 | Socorro | LINEAR | · | 2.1 km | MPC · JPL |
| 153403 | 2001 QC_{121} | — | August 19, 2001 | Socorro | LINEAR | · | 2.1 km | MPC · JPL |
| 153404 | 2001 QH_{122} | — | August 19, 2001 | Socorro | LINEAR | V | 980 m | MPC · JPL |
| 153405 | 2001 QL_{123} | — | August 19, 2001 | Socorro | LINEAR | CLA | 3.4 km | MPC · JPL |
| 153406 | 2001 QT_{125} | — | August 19, 2001 | Socorro | LINEAR | · | 1.3 km | MPC · JPL |
| 153407 | 2001 QT_{131} | — | August 20, 2001 | Socorro | LINEAR | · | 1.7 km | MPC · JPL |
| 153408 | 2001 QV_{137} | — | August 22, 2001 | Socorro | LINEAR | · | 2.5 km | MPC · JPL |
| 153409 | 2001 QG_{139} | — | August 22, 2001 | Socorro | LINEAR | · | 3.1 km | MPC · JPL |
| 153410 | 2001 QZ_{141} | — | August 24, 2001 | Socorro | LINEAR | NYS | 2.2 km | MPC · JPL |
| 153411 | 2001 QX_{142} | — | August 24, 2001 | Goodricke-Pigott | R. A. Tucker | · | 4.6 km | MPC · JPL |
| 153412 | 2001 QR_{145} | — | August 25, 2001 | Kitt Peak | Spacewatch | MAS | 1.1 km | MPC · JPL |
| 153413 | 2001 QN_{147} | — | August 20, 2001 | Palomar | NEAT | · | 3.1 km | MPC · JPL |
| 153414 | 2001 QB_{151} | — | August 23, 2001 | Socorro | LINEAR | PHO | 2.1 km | MPC · JPL |
| 153415 | 2001 QP_{153} | — | August 27, 2001 | Socorro | LINEAR | ATE +1km | 1.4 km | MPC · JPL |
| 153416 | 2001 QO_{160} | — | August 23, 2001 | Anderson Mesa | LONEOS | · | 2.1 km | MPC · JPL |
| 153417 | 2001 QU_{162} | — | August 23, 2001 | Anderson Mesa | LONEOS | · | 1.3 km | MPC · JPL |
| 153418 | 2001 QE_{174} | — | August 26, 2001 | Socorro | LINEAR | V | 1.1 km | MPC · JPL |
| 153419 | 2001 QU_{175} | — | August 23, 2001 | Kitt Peak | Spacewatch | MAS | 1.2 km | MPC · JPL |
| 153420 | 2001 QJ_{178} | — | August 25, 2001 | Palomar | NEAT | · | 2.5 km | MPC · JPL |
| 153421 | 2001 QX_{178} | — | August 27, 2001 | Palomar | NEAT | · | 1.6 km | MPC · JPL |
| 153422 | 2001 QT_{179} | — | August 25, 2001 | Palomar | NEAT | V | 1.1 km | MPC · JPL |
| 153423 | 2001 QN_{203} | — | August 23, 2001 | Anderson Mesa | LONEOS | NYS | 1.6 km | MPC · JPL |
| 153424 | 2001 QC_{204} | — | August 23, 2001 | Anderson Mesa | LONEOS | · | 1.6 km | MPC · JPL |
| 153425 | 2001 QD_{205} | — | August 23, 2001 | Anderson Mesa | LONEOS | · | 2.0 km | MPC · JPL |
| 153426 | 2001 QO_{208} | — | August 23, 2001 | Anderson Mesa | LONEOS | · | 1.8 km | MPC · JPL |
| 153427 | 2001 QV_{212} | — | August 23, 2001 | Anderson Mesa | LONEOS | CLA | 2.5 km | MPC · JPL |
| 153428 | 2001 QY_{212} | — | August 23, 2001 | Anderson Mesa | LONEOS | · | 2.5 km | MPC · JPL |
| 153429 | 2001 QB_{216} | — | August 23, 2001 | Anderson Mesa | LONEOS | · | 1.7 km | MPC · JPL |
| 153430 | 2001 QL_{216} | — | August 23, 2001 | Anderson Mesa | LONEOS | · | 1.1 km | MPC · JPL |
| 153431 | 2001 QP_{217} | — | August 23, 2001 | Anderson Mesa | LONEOS | · | 1.6 km | MPC · JPL |
| 153432 | 2001 QK_{218} | — | August 23, 2001 | Anderson Mesa | LONEOS | · | 1.9 km | MPC · JPL |
| 153433 | 2001 QR_{218} | — | August 23, 2001 | Anderson Mesa | LONEOS | · | 1.5 km | MPC · JPL |
| 153434 | 2001 QK_{222} | — | August 24, 2001 | Anderson Mesa | LONEOS | · | 1.6 km | MPC · JPL |
| 153435 | 2001 QN_{224} | — | August 24, 2001 | Socorro | LINEAR | · | 1.3 km | MPC · JPL |
| 153436 | 2001 QH_{227} | — | August 24, 2001 | Anderson Mesa | LONEOS | · | 2.9 km | MPC · JPL |
| 153437 | 2001 QD_{230} | — | August 24, 2001 | Desert Eagle | W. K. Y. Yeung | · | 1.5 km | MPC · JPL |
| 153438 | 2001 QT_{230} | — | August 24, 2001 | Anderson Mesa | LONEOS | V | 1.1 km | MPC · JPL |
| 153439 | 2001 QR_{234} | — | August 24, 2001 | Socorro | LINEAR | NYS | 1.9 km | MPC · JPL |
| 153440 | 2001 QB_{244} | — | August 24, 2001 | Socorro | LINEAR | V | 1.6 km | MPC · JPL |
| 153441 | 2001 QW_{245} | — | August 24, 2001 | Socorro | LINEAR | · | 3.3 km | MPC · JPL |
| 153442 | 2001 QV_{252} | — | August 25, 2001 | Socorro | LINEAR | · | 1.5 km | MPC · JPL |
| 153443 | 2001 QW_{256} | — | August 25, 2001 | Socorro | LINEAR | V | 1.1 km | MPC · JPL |
| 153444 | 2001 QU_{259} | — | August 25, 2001 | Socorro | LINEAR | · | 1.2 km | MPC · JPL |
| 153445 | 2001 QR_{262} | — | August 25, 2001 | Palomar | NEAT | · | 2.7 km | MPC · JPL |
| 153446 | 2001 QS_{267} | — | August 20, 2001 | Socorro | LINEAR | · | 910 m | MPC · JPL |
| 153447 | 2001 QN_{272} | — | August 19, 2001 | Socorro | LINEAR | · | 1.9 km | MPC · JPL |
| 153448 | 2001 QE_{273} | — | August 19, 2001 | Socorro | LINEAR | V | 1.2 km | MPC · JPL |
| 153449 | 2001 QR_{278} | — | August 19, 2001 | Socorro | LINEAR | · | 1.4 km | MPC · JPL |
| 153450 | 2001 QN_{279} | — | August 19, 2001 | Socorro | LINEAR | V | 1.1 km | MPC · JPL |
| 153451 | 2001 QK_{283} | — | August 18, 2001 | Anderson Mesa | LONEOS | · | 2.6 km | MPC · JPL |
| 153452 | 2001 QQ_{286} | — | August 17, 2001 | Palomar | NEAT | · | 2.0 km | MPC · JPL |
| 153453 | 2001 QR_{287} | — | August 17, 2001 | Socorro | LINEAR | · | 1.5 km | MPC · JPL |
| 153454 | 2001 QC_{290} | — | August 16, 2001 | Socorro | LINEAR | · | 2.8 km | MPC · JPL |
| 153455 | 2001 QT_{296} | — | August 24, 2001 | Socorro | LINEAR | MAS | 1.7 km | MPC · JPL |
| 153456 | 2001 QC_{304} | — | August 19, 2001 | Cerro Tololo | M. W. Buie | · | 1.2 km | MPC · JPL |
| 153457 | 2001 QX_{310} | — | August 19, 2001 | Cerro Tololo | M. W. Buie | · | 1.6 km | MPC · JPL |
| 153458 | 2001 QD_{328} | — | August 24, 2001 | Haleakala | NEAT | NYS | 1.8 km | MPC · JPL |
| 153459 | 2001 QD_{329} | — | August 16, 2001 | Socorro | LINEAR | · | 1.7 km | MPC · JPL |
| 153460 | 2001 RN | — | September 7, 2001 | Socorro | LINEAR | APO | 410 m | MPC · JPL |
| 153461 | 2001 RF_{1} | — | September 7, 2001 | Socorro | LINEAR | · | 1.4 km | MPC · JPL |
| 153462 | 2001 RE_{2} | — | September 8, 2001 | Socorro | LINEAR | PHO | 3.9 km | MPC · JPL |
| 153463 | 2001 RX_{4} | — | September 8, 2001 | Socorro | LINEAR | PHO | 3.2 km | MPC · JPL |
| 153464 | 2001 RW_{6} | — | September 10, 2001 | Desert Eagle | W. K. Y. Yeung | L5 | 20 km | MPC · JPL |
| 153465 | 2001 RF_{7} | — | September 10, 2001 | Desert Eagle | W. K. Y. Yeung | V | 1.4 km | MPC · JPL |
| 153466 | 2001 RC_{11} | — | September 10, 2001 | Desert Eagle | W. K. Y. Yeung | · | 2.0 km | MPC · JPL |
| 153467 | 2001 RU_{13} | — | September 10, 2001 | Socorro | LINEAR | · | 2.3 km | MPC · JPL |
| 153468 | 2001 RO_{16} | — | September 12, 2001 | San Marcello | A. Boattini, G. Forti | NYS | 2.0 km | MPC · JPL |
| 153469 | 2001 RW_{22} | — | September 7, 2001 | Socorro | LINEAR | · | 1.2 km | MPC · JPL |
| 153470 | 2001 RB_{26} | — | September 7, 2001 | Socorro | LINEAR | · | 1.5 km | MPC · JPL |
| 153471 | 2001 RU_{29} | — | September 7, 2001 | Socorro | LINEAR | · | 980 m | MPC · JPL |
| 153472 | 2001 RX_{31} | — | September 8, 2001 | Socorro | LINEAR | · | 1.7 km | MPC · JPL |
| 153473 | 2001 RX_{38} | — | September 9, 2001 | Socorro | LINEAR | · | 1.3 km | MPC · JPL |
| 153474 | 2001 RK_{43} | — | September 12, 2001 | Socorro | LINEAR | · | 2.6 km | MPC · JPL |
| 153475 | 2001 RR_{45} | — | September 14, 2001 | Palomar | NEAT | · | 1.2 km | MPC · JPL |
| 153476 | 2001 RT_{58} | — | September 12, 2001 | Socorro | LINEAR | · | 1.6 km | MPC · JPL |
| 153477 | 2001 RC_{66} | — | September 10, 2001 | Socorro | LINEAR | · | 2.4 km | MPC · JPL |
| 153478 | 2001 RE_{66} | — | September 10, 2001 | Socorro | LINEAR | V | 1.3 km | MPC · JPL |
| 153479 | 2001 RQ_{66} | — | September 10, 2001 | Socorro | LINEAR | · | 2.6 km | MPC · JPL |
| 153480 | 2001 RT_{66} | — | September 10, 2001 | Socorro | LINEAR | · | 2.8 km | MPC · JPL |
| 153481 | 2001 RY_{68} | — | September 10, 2001 | Socorro | LINEAR | · | 1.7 km | MPC · JPL |
| 153482 | 2001 RK_{69} | — | September 10, 2001 | Socorro | LINEAR | (5) | 1.9 km | MPC · JPL |
| 153483 | 2001 RK_{76} | — | September 10, 2001 | Socorro | LINEAR | · | 3.0 km | MPC · JPL |
| 153484 | 2001 RQ_{80} | — | September 14, 2001 | Palomar | NEAT | HOF | 4.4 km | MPC · JPL |
| 153485 | 2001 RZ_{81} | — | September 14, 2001 | Ondřejov | P. Kušnirák | · | 2.5 km | MPC · JPL |
| 153486 | 2001 RB_{82} | — | September 12, 2001 | Goodricke-Pigott | R. A. Tucker | · | 3.0 km | MPC · JPL |
| 153487 | 2001 RF_{86} | — | September 11, 2001 | Anderson Mesa | LONEOS | · | 1.6 km | MPC · JPL |
| 153488 | 2001 RL_{87} | — | September 11, 2001 | Anderson Mesa | LONEOS | · | 1.8 km | MPC · JPL |
| 153489 | 2001 RT_{87} | — | September 11, 2001 | Anderson Mesa | LONEOS | · | 2.0 km | MPC · JPL |
| 153490 | 2001 RF_{89} | — | September 11, 2001 | Anderson Mesa | LONEOS | V | 1.6 km | MPC · JPL |
| 153491 | 2001 RK_{90} | — | September 11, 2001 | Anderson Mesa | LONEOS | V | 1.1 km | MPC · JPL |
| 153492 | 2001 RJ_{93} | — | September 11, 2001 | Anderson Mesa | LONEOS | V | 1.4 km | MPC · JPL |
| 153493 | 2001 RX_{101} | — | September 12, 2001 | Socorro | LINEAR | · | 2.1 km | MPC · JPL |
| 153494 | 2001 RF_{107} | — | September 12, 2001 | Socorro | LINEAR | · | 1.7 km | MPC · JPL |
| 153495 | 2001 RQ_{113} | — | September 12, 2001 | Socorro | LINEAR | · | 1.8 km | MPC · JPL |
| 153496 | 2001 RY_{113} | — | September 12, 2001 | Socorro | LINEAR | · | 1.8 km | MPC · JPL |
| 153497 | 2001 RV_{118} | — | September 12, 2001 | Socorro | LINEAR | · | 2.9 km | MPC · JPL |
| 153498 | 2001 RL_{119} | — | September 12, 2001 | Socorro | LINEAR | fast | 3.9 km | MPC · JPL |
| 153499 | 2001 RL_{122} | — | September 12, 2001 | Socorro | LINEAR | NYS | 1.9 km | MPC · JPL |
| 153500 | 2001 RN_{122} | — | September 12, 2001 | Socorro | LINEAR | L5 | 14 km | MPC · JPL |

== 153501–153600 ==
back to top

| Designation | | | Discovery | | | Properties | | Ref |
| Permanent | Provisional | Named after | Date | Site | Discoverer(s) | Category | Diam. | Ref |
|---|---|---|---|---|---|---|---|---|
| 153501 | 2001 RG_{126} | — | September 12, 2001 | Socorro | LINEAR | · | 3.1 km | MPC · JPL |
| 153502 | 2001 RU_{128} | — | September 12, 2001 | Socorro | LINEAR | · | 1.9 km | MPC · JPL |
| 153503 | 2001 RB_{129} | — | September 12, 2001 | Socorro | LINEAR | · | 1.3 km | MPC · JPL |
| 153504 | 2001 RE_{130} | — | September 12, 2001 | Socorro | LINEAR | · | 1.2 km | MPC · JPL |
| 153505 | 2001 RV_{130} | — | September 12, 2001 | Socorro | LINEAR | MAS | 1.7 km | MPC · JPL |
| 153506 | 2001 RC_{133} | — | September 12, 2001 | Socorro | LINEAR | (5) · slow | 1.8 km | MPC · JPL |
| 153507 | 2001 RL_{135} | — | September 12, 2001 | Socorro | LINEAR | · | 1.9 km | MPC · JPL |
| 153508 | 2001 RF_{137} | — | September 12, 2001 | Socorro | LINEAR | NYS | 1.7 km | MPC · JPL |
| 153509 | 2001 RJ_{139} | — | September 12, 2001 | Socorro | LINEAR | · | 2.5 km | MPC · JPL |
| 153510 | 2001 RB_{146} | — | September 8, 2001 | Socorro | LINEAR | · | 2.4 km | MPC · JPL |
| 153511 | 2001 RT_{146} | — | September 9, 2001 | Palomar | NEAT | · | 1.5 km | MPC · JPL |
| 153512 | 2001 SB_{3} | — | September 17, 2001 | Desert Eagle | W. K. Y. Yeung | · | 2.3 km | MPC · JPL |
| 153513 | 2001 SJ_{6} | — | September 18, 2001 | Kitt Peak | Spacewatch | · | 2.9 km | MPC · JPL |
| 153514 | 2001 SZ_{6} | — | September 18, 2001 | Kitt Peak | Spacewatch | · | 1.1 km | MPC · JPL |
| 153515 | 2001 SD_{13} | — | September 16, 2001 | Socorro | LINEAR | PHO | 1.7 km | MPC · JPL |
| 153516 | 2001 SH_{14} | — | September 16, 2001 | Socorro | LINEAR | · | 1.6 km | MPC · JPL |
| 153517 | 2001 SO_{14} | — | September 16, 2001 | Socorro | LINEAR | · | 2.0 km | MPC · JPL |
| 153518 | 2001 ST_{14} | — | September 16, 2001 | Socorro | LINEAR | NYS | 1.5 km | MPC · JPL |
| 153519 | 2001 SD_{17} | — | September 16, 2001 | Socorro | LINEAR | NYS | 1.6 km | MPC · JPL |
| 153520 | 2001 SW_{28} | — | September 16, 2001 | Socorro | LINEAR | · | 1.4 km | MPC · JPL |
| 153521 | 2001 SV_{36} | — | September 16, 2001 | Socorro | LINEAR | · | 1.3 km | MPC · JPL |
| 153522 | 2001 SN_{38} | — | September 16, 2001 | Socorro | LINEAR | · | 2.0 km | MPC · JPL |
| 153523 | 2001 SS_{38} | — | September 16, 2001 | Socorro | LINEAR | · | 2.1 km | MPC · JPL |
| 153524 | 2001 SG_{39} | — | September 16, 2001 | Socorro | LINEAR | · | 1.9 km | MPC · JPL |
| 153525 | 2001 SL_{43} | — | September 16, 2001 | Socorro | LINEAR | · | 1.3 km | MPC · JPL |
| 153526 | 2001 SB_{44} | — | September 16, 2001 | Socorro | LINEAR | · | 1.6 km | MPC · JPL |
| 153527 | 2001 SM_{47} | — | September 16, 2001 | Socorro | LINEAR | V | 1.4 km | MPC · JPL |
| 153528 | 2001 SZ_{49} | — | September 16, 2001 | Socorro | LINEAR | (5) | 2.0 km | MPC · JPL |
| 153529 | 2001 SD_{53} | — | September 16, 2001 | Socorro | LINEAR | · | 3.0 km | MPC · JPL |
| 153530 | 2001 SL_{61} | — | September 17, 2001 | Socorro | LINEAR | · | 1.8 km | MPC · JPL |
| 153531 | 2001 SH_{63} | — | September 17, 2001 | Socorro | LINEAR | · | 2.0 km | MPC · JPL |
| 153532 | 2001 SK_{63} | — | September 17, 2001 | Socorro | LINEAR | · | 1.6 km | MPC · JPL |
| 153533 | 2001 SE_{66} | — | September 17, 2001 | Socorro | LINEAR | · | 2.5 km | MPC · JPL |
| 153534 | 2001 SH_{66} | — | September 17, 2001 | Socorro | LINEAR | · | 2.2 km | MPC · JPL |
| 153535 | 2001 SZ_{66} | — | September 17, 2001 | Socorro | LINEAR | · | 2.0 km | MPC · JPL |
| 153536 | 2001 SF_{93} | — | September 20, 2001 | Socorro | LINEAR | V | 820 m | MPC · JPL |
| 153537 | 2001 SQ_{93} | — | September 20, 2001 | Socorro | LINEAR | · | 2.1 km | MPC · JPL |
| 153538 | 2001 SO_{97} | — | September 20, 2001 | Socorro | LINEAR | ERI | 2.8 km | MPC · JPL |
| 153539 | 2001 SD_{101} | — | September 20, 2001 | Socorro | LINEAR | · | 2.0 km | MPC · JPL |
| 153540 | 2001 SA_{103} | — | September 20, 2001 | Socorro | LINEAR | · | 1.4 km | MPC · JPL |
| 153541 | 2001 SW_{106} | — | September 20, 2001 | Socorro | LINEAR | · | 2.5 km | MPC · JPL |
| 153542 | 2001 SS_{107} | — | September 20, 2001 | Socorro | LINEAR | T_{j} (2.92) | 4.3 km | MPC · JPL |
| 153543 | 2001 SM_{110} | — | September 20, 2001 | Socorro | LINEAR | · | 2.8 km | MPC · JPL |
| 153544 | 2001 SR_{112} | — | September 18, 2001 | Desert Eagle | W. K. Y. Yeung | V | 1.4 km | MPC · JPL |
| 153545 | 2001 SS_{114} | — | September 20, 2001 | Desert Eagle | W. K. Y. Yeung | · | 1.4 km | MPC · JPL |
| 153546 | 2001 SZ_{114} | — | September 20, 2001 | Desert Eagle | W. K. Y. Yeung | KON | 6.0 km | MPC · JPL |
| 153547 | 2001 SY_{118} | — | September 16, 2001 | Socorro | LINEAR | · | 1.2 km | MPC · JPL |
| 153548 | 2001 SN_{120} | — | September 16, 2001 | Socorro | LINEAR | · | 1.9 km | MPC · JPL |
| 153549 | 2001 SG_{124} | — | September 16, 2001 | Socorro | LINEAR | · | 2.3 km | MPC · JPL |
| 153550 | 2001 SJ_{125} | — | September 16, 2001 | Socorro | LINEAR | V | 1.2 km | MPC · JPL |
| 153551 | 2001 SG_{131} | — | September 16, 2001 | Socorro | LINEAR | · | 2.2 km | MPC · JPL |
| 153552 | 2001 SZ_{132} | — | September 16, 2001 | Socorro | LINEAR | (5) | 1.8 km | MPC · JPL |
| 153553 | 2001 SM_{134} | — | September 16, 2001 | Socorro | LINEAR | · | 1.8 km | MPC · JPL |
| 153554 | 2001 SQ_{135} | — | September 16, 2001 | Socorro | LINEAR | NYS | 1.3 km | MPC · JPL |
| 153555 | 2001 SE_{136} | — | September 16, 2001 | Socorro | LINEAR | · | 1.4 km | MPC · JPL |
| 153556 | 2001 SJ_{138} | — | September 16, 2001 | Socorro | LINEAR | · | 1.8 km | MPC · JPL |
| 153557 | 2001 SA_{139} | — | September 16, 2001 | Socorro | LINEAR | NYS | 1.6 km | MPC · JPL |
| 153558 | 2001 SN_{139} | — | September 16, 2001 | Socorro | LINEAR | · | 2.0 km | MPC · JPL |
| 153559 | 2001 SJ_{141} | — | September 16, 2001 | Socorro | LINEAR | · | 1.4 km | MPC · JPL |
| 153560 | 2001 SF_{150} | — | September 17, 2001 | Socorro | LINEAR | · | 1.6 km | MPC · JPL |
| 153561 | 2001 SS_{155} | — | September 17, 2001 | Socorro | LINEAR | · | 2.2 km | MPC · JPL |
| 153562 | 2001 SL_{157} | — | September 17, 2001 | Socorro | LINEAR | V | 1.4 km | MPC · JPL |
| 153563 | 2001 SN_{157} | — | September 17, 2001 | Socorro | LINEAR | · | 2.1 km | MPC · JPL |
| 153564 | 2001 SE_{158} | — | September 17, 2001 | Socorro | LINEAR | · | 4.3 km | MPC · JPL |
| 153565 | 2001 SQ_{161} | — | September 17, 2001 | Socorro | LINEAR | V | 1.2 km | MPC · JPL |
| 153566 | 2001 SR_{163} | — | September 17, 2001 | Socorro | LINEAR | · | 1.9 km | MPC · JPL |
| 153567 | 2001 SV_{163} | — | September 17, 2001 | Socorro | LINEAR | · | 2.4 km | MPC · JPL |
| 153568 | 2001 SQ_{167} | — | September 19, 2001 | Socorro | LINEAR | NYS | 1.2 km | MPC · JPL |
| 153569 | 2001 SR_{173} | — | September 16, 2001 | Socorro | LINEAR | · | 1.4 km | MPC · JPL |
| 153570 | 2001 SH_{184} | — | September 19, 2001 | Socorro | LINEAR | · | 1.9 km | MPC · JPL |
| 153571 | 2001 SQ_{184} | — | September 19, 2001 | Socorro | LINEAR | · | 1.1 km | MPC · JPL |
| 153572 | 2001 SL_{197} | — | September 19, 2001 | Socorro | LINEAR | · | 1.5 km | MPC · JPL |
| 153573 | 2001 SU_{210} | — | September 19, 2001 | Socorro | LINEAR | NYS | 1.9 km | MPC · JPL |
| 153574 | 2001 SJ_{220} | — | September 19, 2001 | Socorro | LINEAR | · | 1.4 km | MPC · JPL |
| 153575 | 2001 SP_{226} | — | September 19, 2001 | Socorro | LINEAR | NYS | 1.6 km | MPC · JPL |
| 153576 | 2001 SJ_{230} | — | September 19, 2001 | Socorro | LINEAR | NYS | 2.6 km | MPC · JPL |
| 153577 | 2001 SN_{233} | — | September 19, 2001 | Socorro | LINEAR | · | 2.0 km | MPC · JPL |
| 153578 | 2001 SX_{237} | — | September 19, 2001 | Socorro | LINEAR | · | 1.8 km | MPC · JPL |
| 153579 | 2001 SH_{241} | — | September 19, 2001 | Socorro | LINEAR | MAS | 970 m | MPC · JPL |
| 153580 | 2001 SY_{241} | — | September 19, 2001 | Socorro | LINEAR | · | 1.1 km | MPC · JPL |
| 153581 | 2001 SH_{242} | — | September 19, 2001 | Socorro | LINEAR | · | 2.6 km | MPC · JPL |
| 153582 | 2001 SO_{243} | — | September 19, 2001 | Socorro | LINEAR | MAS | 1.1 km | MPC · JPL |
| 153583 | 2001 SG_{244} | — | September 19, 2001 | Socorro | LINEAR | V | 870 m | MPC · JPL |
| 153584 | 2001 SS_{245} | — | September 19, 2001 | Socorro | LINEAR | V · fast | 1.1 km | MPC · JPL |
| 153585 | 2001 SM_{246} | — | September 19, 2001 | Socorro | LINEAR | · | 2.0 km | MPC · JPL |
| 153586 | 2001 SR_{246} | — | September 19, 2001 | Socorro | LINEAR | MAS | 1.2 km | MPC · JPL |
| 153587 | 2001 SG_{250} | — | September 19, 2001 | Socorro | LINEAR | (5) | 1.6 km | MPC · JPL |
| 153588 | 2001 SC_{251} | — | September 19, 2001 | Socorro | LINEAR | · | 2.0 km | MPC · JPL |
| 153589 | 2001 SS_{255} | — | September 19, 2001 | Socorro | LINEAR | PHO | 4.3 km | MPC · JPL |
| 153590 | 2001 SY_{256} | — | September 19, 2001 | Socorro | LINEAR | · | 1.9 km | MPC · JPL |
| 153591 | 2001 SN_{263} | — | September 20, 2001 | Socorro | LINEAR | AMO +1km · PHA · moon | 2.0 km | MPC · JPL |
| 153592 | 2001 SG_{266} | — | September 25, 2001 | Desert Eagle | W. K. Y. Yeung | · | 1.0 km | MPC · JPL |
| 153593 | 2001 SX_{268} | — | September 19, 2001 | Kitt Peak | Spacewatch | · | 1.1 km | MPC · JPL |
| 153594 | 2001 SH_{271} | — | September 20, 2001 | Socorro | LINEAR | · | 1.3 km | MPC · JPL |
| 153595 | 2001 SW_{271} | — | September 20, 2001 | Socorro | LINEAR | · | 1.8 km | MPC · JPL |
| 153596 | 2001 SA_{277} | — | September 21, 2001 | Palomar | NEAT | · | 3.3 km | MPC · JPL |
| 153597 | 2001 SE_{279} | — | September 21, 2001 | Anderson Mesa | LONEOS | · | 3.0 km | MPC · JPL |
| 153598 | 2001 SV_{279} | — | September 21, 2001 | Anderson Mesa | LONEOS | NYS | 2.7 km | MPC · JPL |
| 153599 | 2001 SD_{280} | — | September 21, 2001 | Anderson Mesa | LONEOS | · | 3.1 km | MPC · JPL |
| 153600 | 2001 SU_{280} | — | September 21, 2001 | Anderson Mesa | LONEOS | · | 4.0 km | MPC · JPL |

== 153601–153700 ==
back to top

| Designation | | | Discovery | | | Properties | | Ref |
| Permanent | Provisional | Named after | Date | Site | Discoverer(s) | Category | Diam. | Ref |
|---|---|---|---|---|---|---|---|---|
| 153601 | 2001 SQ_{281} | — | September 21, 2001 | Anderson Mesa | LONEOS | · | 2.1 km | MPC · JPL |
| 153602 | 2001 SS_{283} | — | September 21, 2001 | Kitt Peak | Spacewatch | MAS | 810 m | MPC · JPL |
| 153603 | 2001 SL_{285} | — | September 22, 2001 | Kitt Peak | Spacewatch | · | 2.6 km | MPC · JPL |
| 153604 | 2001 SC_{293} | — | September 16, 2001 | Socorro | LINEAR | V | 1.1 km | MPC · JPL |
| 153605 | 2001 SD_{309} | — | September 22, 2001 | Socorro | LINEAR | CLA | 2.7 km | MPC · JPL |
| 153606 | 2001 SW_{312} | — | September 21, 2001 | Socorro | LINEAR | · | 2.4 km | MPC · JPL |
| 153607 | 2001 SZ_{315} | — | September 25, 2001 | Socorro | LINEAR | · | 3.7 km | MPC · JPL |
| 153608 | 2001 SQ_{318} | — | September 21, 2001 | Socorro | LINEAR | V | 1.0 km | MPC · JPL |
| 153609 | 2001 SP_{333} | — | September 19, 2001 | Socorro | LINEAR | · | 1.2 km | MPC · JPL |
| 153610 | 2001 SR_{338} | — | September 20, 2001 | Socorro | LINEAR | · | 1.4 km | MPC · JPL |
| 153611 | 2001 SO_{341} | — | September 21, 2001 | Anderson Mesa | LONEOS | · | 3.1 km | MPC · JPL |
| 153612 | 2001 SN_{353} | — | September 22, 2001 | Palomar | NEAT | MAR | 1.5 km | MPC · JPL |
| 153613 | 2001 TK_{1} | — | October 10, 2001 | Kitt Peak | Spacewatch | (5) | 1.6 km | MPC · JPL |
| 153614 | 2001 TN_{3} | — | October 7, 2001 | Palomar | NEAT | · | 3.1 km | MPC · JPL |
| 153615 | 2001 TM_{11} | — | October 13, 2001 | Socorro | LINEAR | · | 2.3 km | MPC · JPL |
| 153616 | 2001 TD_{17} | — | October 14, 2001 | Ondřejov | P. Pravec, P. Kušnirák | HNS | 2.5 km | MPC · JPL |
| 153617 | 2001 TR_{17} | — | October 14, 2001 | Desert Eagle | W. K. Y. Yeung | · | 2.0 km | MPC · JPL |
| 153618 | 2001 TP_{19} | — | October 9, 2001 | Socorro | LINEAR | · | 2.9 km | MPC · JPL |
| 153619 | 2001 TT_{20} | — | October 9, 2001 | Socorro | LINEAR | · | 3.1 km | MPC · JPL |
| 153620 | 2001 TX_{20} | — | October 9, 2001 | Socorro | LINEAR | EUN | 2.8 km | MPC · JPL |
| 153621 | 2001 TC_{21} | — | October 9, 2001 | Socorro | LINEAR | EUN | 2.3 km | MPC · JPL |
| 153622 | 2001 TB_{33} | — | October 14, 2001 | Socorro | LINEAR | · | 2.7 km | MPC · JPL |
| 153623 | 2001 TF_{35} | — | October 14, 2001 | Socorro | LINEAR | · | 2.3 km | MPC · JPL |
| 153624 | 2001 TJ_{36} | — | October 14, 2001 | Socorro | LINEAR | · | 3.8 km | MPC · JPL |
| 153625 | 2001 TK_{39} | — | October 14, 2001 | Socorro | LINEAR | · | 2.7 km | MPC · JPL |
| 153626 | 2001 TF_{44} | — | October 14, 2001 | Socorro | LINEAR | · | 3.4 km | MPC · JPL |
| 153627 | 2001 TZ_{45} | — | October 15, 2001 | Socorro | LINEAR | HNS | 1.4 km | MPC · JPL |
| 153628 | 2001 TE_{48} | — | October 9, 2001 | Kitt Peak | Spacewatch | · | 1.7 km | MPC · JPL |
| 153629 | 2001 TD_{54} | — | October 14, 2001 | Socorro | LINEAR | PHO | 1.5 km | MPC · JPL |
| 153630 | 2001 TA_{57} | — | October 11, 2001 | Socorro | LINEAR | · | 2.0 km | MPC · JPL |
| 153631 | 2001 TF_{61} | — | October 13, 2001 | Socorro | LINEAR | · | 1.6 km | MPC · JPL |
| 153632 | 2001 TT_{63} | — | October 13, 2001 | Socorro | LINEAR | · | 1.3 km | MPC · JPL |
| 153633 | 2001 TM_{64} | — | October 13, 2001 | Socorro | LINEAR | NYS | 2.1 km | MPC · JPL |
| 153634 | 2001 TS_{65} | — | October 13, 2001 | Socorro | LINEAR | MAS | 1.6 km | MPC · JPL |
| 153635 | 2001 TU_{70} | — | October 13, 2001 | Socorro | LINEAR | · | 3.5 km | MPC · JPL |
| 153636 | 2001 TS_{73} | — | October 13, 2001 | Socorro | LINEAR | · | 1.6 km | MPC · JPL |
| 153637 | 2001 TS_{76} | — | October 13, 2001 | Socorro | LINEAR | KOR | 2.9 km | MPC · JPL |
| 153638 | 2001 TX_{76} | — | October 13, 2001 | Socorro | LINEAR | · | 2.5 km | MPC · JPL |
| 153639 | 2001 TZ_{76} | — | October 13, 2001 | Socorro | LINEAR | (5) | 2.3 km | MPC · JPL |
| 153640 | 2001 TS_{77} | — | October 13, 2001 | Socorro | LINEAR | · | 1.9 km | MPC · JPL |
| 153641 | 2001 TD_{79} | — | October 13, 2001 | Socorro | LINEAR | · | 3.5 km | MPC · JPL |
| 153642 | 2001 TS_{79} | — | October 13, 2001 | Socorro | LINEAR | NYS | 4.7 km | MPC · JPL |
| 153643 | 2001 TX_{82} | — | October 14, 2001 | Socorro | LINEAR | TEL | 2.0 km | MPC · JPL |
| 153644 | 2001 TO_{87} | — | October 14, 2001 | Socorro | LINEAR | · | 2.2 km | MPC · JPL |
| 153645 | 2001 TV_{93} | — | October 14, 2001 | Socorro | LINEAR | · | 1.4 km | MPC · JPL |
| 153646 | 2001 TC_{95} | — | October 14, 2001 | Socorro | LINEAR | · | 1.5 km | MPC · JPL |
| 153647 | 2001 TJ_{97} | — | October 14, 2001 | Socorro | LINEAR | · | 2.0 km | MPC · JPL |
| 153648 | 2001 TE_{101} | — | October 14, 2001 | Socorro | LINEAR | · | 3.2 km | MPC · JPL |
| 153649 | 2001 TJ_{102} | — | October 15, 2001 | Socorro | LINEAR | · | 2.5 km | MPC · JPL |
| 153650 | 2001 TO_{102} | — | October 15, 2001 | Socorro | LINEAR | · | 2.3 km | MPC · JPL |
| 153651 | 2001 TT_{102} | — | October 15, 2001 | Socorro | LINEAR | SUL | 3.6 km | MPC · JPL |
| 153652 | 2001 TC_{103} | — | October 15, 2001 | Socorro | LINEAR | · | 4.4 km | MPC · JPL |
| 153653 | 2001 TA_{104} | — | October 15, 2001 | Desert Eagle | W. K. Y. Yeung | · | 1.8 km | MPC · JPL |
| 153654 | 2001 TB_{113} | — | October 14, 2001 | Socorro | LINEAR | NYS | 1.9 km | MPC · JPL |
| 153655 | 2001 TQ_{118} | — | October 15, 2001 | Socorro | LINEAR | · | 2.6 km | MPC · JPL |
| 153656 | 2001 TE_{122} | — | October 15, 2001 | Socorro | LINEAR | · | 2.0 km | MPC · JPL |
| 153657 | 2001 TO_{130} | — | October 8, 2001 | Palomar | NEAT | · | 3.0 km | MPC · JPL |
| 153658 | 2001 TL_{134} | — | October 12, 2001 | Haleakala | NEAT | · | 1.7 km | MPC · JPL |
| 153659 | 2001 TC_{140} | — | October 10, 2001 | Palomar | NEAT | · | 1.5 km | MPC · JPL |
| 153660 | 2001 TB_{146} | — | October 10, 2001 | Palomar | NEAT | EUN | 2.2 km | MPC · JPL |
| 153661 | 2001 TH_{147} | — | October 10, 2001 | Palomar | NEAT | (5) | 1.9 km | MPC · JPL |
| 153662 | 2001 TY_{150} | — | October 10, 2001 | Palomar | NEAT | · | 2.4 km | MPC · JPL |
| 153663 | 2001 TL_{152} | — | October 10, 2001 | Palomar | NEAT | · | 1.4 km | MPC · JPL |
| 153664 | 2001 TN_{152} | — | October 10, 2001 | Palomar | NEAT | · | 1.8 km | MPC · JPL |
| 153665 | 2001 TL_{164} | — | October 11, 2001 | Palomar | NEAT | · | 1.8 km | MPC · JPL |
| 153666 | 2001 TC_{170} | — | October 15, 2001 | Socorro | LINEAR | · | 3.0 km | MPC · JPL |
| 153667 | 2001 TK_{174} | — | October 14, 2001 | Socorro | LINEAR | · | 1.5 km | MPC · JPL |
| 153668 | 2001 TU_{181} | — | October 14, 2001 | Socorro | LINEAR | · | 2.4 km | MPC · JPL |
| 153669 | 2001 TL_{185} | — | October 14, 2001 | Socorro | LINEAR | · | 3.3 km | MPC · JPL |
| 153670 | 2001 TJ_{187} | — | October 14, 2001 | Socorro | LINEAR | · | 1.6 km | MPC · JPL |
| 153671 | 2001 TF_{188} | — | October 14, 2001 | Socorro | LINEAR | · | 2.5 km | MPC · JPL |
| 153672 | 2001 TO_{189} | — | October 14, 2001 | Socorro | LINEAR | V | 1.6 km | MPC · JPL |
| 153673 | 2001 TW_{189} | — | October 14, 2001 | Socorro | LINEAR | (5) | 1.7 km | MPC · JPL |
| 153674 | 2001 TE_{190} | — | October 14, 2001 | Socorro | LINEAR | · | 2.1 km | MPC · JPL |
| 153675 | 2001 TG_{190} | — | October 14, 2001 | Socorro | LINEAR | · | 2.2 km | MPC · JPL |
| 153676 | 2001 TY_{191} | — | October 14, 2001 | Socorro | LINEAR | · | 2.7 km | MPC · JPL |
| 153677 | 2001 TS_{194} | — | October 15, 2001 | Socorro | LINEAR | · | 2.0 km | MPC · JPL |
| 153678 | 2001 TM_{200} | — | October 11, 2001 | Socorro | LINEAR | · | 2.0 km | MPC · JPL |
| 153679 | 2001 TN_{206} | — | October 11, 2001 | Socorro | LINEAR | · | 2.8 km | MPC · JPL |
| 153680 | 2001 TW_{208} | — | October 12, 2001 | Anderson Mesa | LONEOS | · | 2.0 km | MPC · JPL |
| 153681 | 2001 TC_{209} | — | October 12, 2001 | Anderson Mesa | LONEOS | HNS | 1.9 km | MPC · JPL |
| 153682 | 2001 TG_{224} | — | October 14, 2001 | Socorro | LINEAR | · | 2.7 km | MPC · JPL |
| 153683 | 2001 TL_{225} | — | October 14, 2001 | Kitt Peak | Spacewatch | NYS | 2.3 km | MPC · JPL |
| 153684 | 2001 TR_{225} | — | October 14, 2001 | Anderson Mesa | LONEOS | · | 2.8 km | MPC · JPL |
| 153685 | 2001 TW_{229} | — | October 15, 2001 | Palomar | NEAT | (5) | 2.3 km | MPC · JPL |
| 153686 Pathall | 2001 TZ_{242} | Pathall | October 14, 2001 | Apache Point | SDSS | · | 2.4 km | MPC · JPL |
| 153687 | 2001 UH_{3} | — | October 16, 2001 | Socorro | LINEAR | · | 2.8 km | MPC · JPL |
| 153688 | 2001 UB_{8} | — | October 17, 2001 | Socorro | LINEAR | · | 1.3 km | MPC · JPL |
| 153689 | 2001 UY_{10} | — | October 22, 2001 | Desert Eagle | W. K. Y. Yeung | · | 2.2 km | MPC · JPL |
| 153690 | 2001 UH_{15} | — | October 24, 2001 | Desert Eagle | W. K. Y. Yeung | · | 2.5 km | MPC · JPL |
| 153691 | 2001 UY_{15} | — | October 25, 2001 | Desert Eagle | W. K. Y. Yeung | · | 2.7 km | MPC · JPL |
| 153692 | 2001 US_{17} | — | October 25, 2001 | Socorro | LINEAR | · | 860 m | MPC · JPL |
| 153693 | 2001 UG_{23} | — | October 18, 2001 | Socorro | LINEAR | · | 4.5 km | MPC · JPL |
| 153694 | 2001 UV_{28} | — | October 16, 2001 | Socorro | LINEAR | · | 1.2 km | MPC · JPL |
| 153695 | 2001 US_{35} | — | October 16, 2001 | Socorro | LINEAR | · | 2.4 km | MPC · JPL |
| 153696 | 2001 UO_{36} | — | October 16, 2001 | Socorro | LINEAR | · | 2.3 km | MPC · JPL |
| 153697 | 2001 UN_{40} | — | October 17, 2001 | Socorro | LINEAR | · | 1.7 km | MPC · JPL |
| 153698 | 2001 UJ_{43} | — | October 17, 2001 | Socorro | LINEAR | V | 1.3 km | MPC · JPL |
| 153699 | 2001 UB_{46} | — | October 17, 2001 | Socorro | LINEAR | MAS | 1.2 km | MPC · JPL |
| 153700 | 2001 UM_{46} | — | October 17, 2001 | Socorro | LINEAR | V | 1.0 km | MPC · JPL |

== 153701–153800 ==
back to top

| Designation | | | Discovery | | | Properties | | Ref |
| Permanent | Provisional | Named after | Date | Site | Discoverer(s) | Category | Diam. | Ref |
|---|---|---|---|---|---|---|---|---|
| 153701 | 2001 UT_{46} | — | October 17, 2001 | Socorro | LINEAR | · | 1.7 km | MPC · JPL |
| 153702 | 2001 UO_{47} | — | October 17, 2001 | Socorro | LINEAR | · | 2.8 km | MPC · JPL |
| 153703 | 2001 UK_{48} | — | October 17, 2001 | Socorro | LINEAR | · | 1.9 km | MPC · JPL |
| 153704 | 2001 UJ_{53} | — | October 17, 2001 | Socorro | LINEAR | · | 2.5 km | MPC · JPL |
| 153705 | 2001 UF_{56} | — | October 17, 2001 | Socorro | LINEAR | · | 1.7 km | MPC · JPL |
| 153706 | 2001 UQ_{61} | — | October 17, 2001 | Socorro | LINEAR | · | 1.7 km | MPC · JPL |
| 153707 | 2001 UN_{74} | — | October 17, 2001 | Socorro | LINEAR | (5) | 2.0 km | MPC · JPL |
| 153708 | 2001 UK_{76} | — | October 17, 2001 | Socorro | LINEAR | L5 | 15 km | MPC · JPL |
| 153709 | 2001 US_{80} | — | October 20, 2001 | Socorro | LINEAR | · | 2.5 km | MPC · JPL |
| 153710 | 2001 UR_{82} | — | October 20, 2001 | Socorro | LINEAR | · | 1.9 km | MPC · JPL |
| 153711 | 2001 UG_{90} | — | October 21, 2001 | Kitt Peak | Spacewatch | · | 1.5 km | MPC · JPL |
| 153712 | 2001 UN_{92} | — | October 18, 2001 | Palomar | NEAT | · | 2.0 km | MPC · JPL |
| 153713 | 2001 US_{95} | — | October 16, 2001 | Socorro | LINEAR | · | 2.0 km | MPC · JPL |
| 153714 | 2001 UM_{96} | — | October 17, 2001 | Socorro | LINEAR | MAS | 960 m | MPC · JPL |
| 153715 | 2001 UT_{96} | — | October 17, 2001 | Socorro | LINEAR | · | 1.5 km | MPC · JPL |
| 153716 | 2001 UE_{97} | — | October 17, 2001 | Socorro | LINEAR | · | 3.8 km | MPC · JPL |
| 153717 | 2001 UV_{100} | — | October 20, 2001 | Socorro | LINEAR | EUN | 1.5 km | MPC · JPL |
| 153718 | 2001 UD_{104} | — | October 20, 2001 | Socorro | LINEAR | · | 1.6 km | MPC · JPL |
| 153719 | 2001 UW_{104} | — | October 20, 2001 | Socorro | LINEAR | · | 1.8 km | MPC · JPL |
| 153720 | 2001 UL_{105} | — | October 20, 2001 | Socorro | LINEAR | (5) | 1.7 km | MPC · JPL |
| 153721 | 2001 UO_{109} | — | October 20, 2001 | Socorro | LINEAR | · | 3.1 km | MPC · JPL |
| 153722 | 2001 UQ_{112} | — | October 21, 2001 | Socorro | LINEAR | · | 1.6 km | MPC · JPL |
| 153723 | 2001 UG_{114} | — | October 22, 2001 | Socorro | LINEAR | (5) | 1.7 km | MPC · JPL |
| 153724 | 2001 UM_{118} | — | October 22, 2001 | Socorro | LINEAR | · | 3.0 km | MPC · JPL |
| 153725 | 2001 UP_{118} | — | October 22, 2001 | Socorro | LINEAR | · | 1.7 km | MPC · JPL |
| 153726 | 2001 UU_{119} | — | October 22, 2001 | Socorro | LINEAR | · | 3.5 km | MPC · JPL |
| 153727 | 2001 UY_{119} | — | October 22, 2001 | Socorro | LINEAR | · | 2.4 km | MPC · JPL |
| 153728 | 2001 UD_{120} | — | October 22, 2001 | Socorro | LINEAR | · | 1.4 km | MPC · JPL |
| 153729 | 2001 UW_{122} | — | October 22, 2001 | Socorro | LINEAR | NYS | 2.1 km | MPC · JPL |
| 153730 | 2001 UJ_{125} | — | October 22, 2001 | Palomar | NEAT | · | 2.0 km | MPC · JPL |
| 153731 | 2001 UC_{132} | — | October 20, 2001 | Socorro | LINEAR | MAR | 1.5 km | MPC · JPL |
| 153732 | 2001 UL_{132} | — | October 20, 2001 | Socorro | LINEAR | · | 4.6 km | MPC · JPL |
| 153733 | 2001 UV_{132} | — | October 21, 2001 | Socorro | LINEAR | · | 1.8 km | MPC · JPL |
| 153734 | 2001 UF_{134} | — | October 21, 2001 | Socorro | LINEAR | · | 3.3 km | MPC · JPL |
| 153735 | 2001 UH_{137} | — | October 23, 2001 | Socorro | LINEAR | · | 2.2 km | MPC · JPL |
| 153736 | 2001 UR_{137} | — | October 23, 2001 | Socorro | LINEAR | NYS | 1.5 km | MPC · JPL |
| 153737 | 2001 UN_{140} | — | October 23, 2001 | Socorro | LINEAR | · | 1.8 km | MPC · JPL |
| 153738 | 2001 US_{142} | — | October 23, 2001 | Socorro | LINEAR | (5) | 1.6 km | MPC · JPL |
| 153739 | 2001 UY_{142} | — | October 23, 2001 | Socorro | LINEAR | · | 1.8 km | MPC · JPL |
| 153740 | 2001 UL_{143} | — | October 23, 2001 | Socorro | LINEAR | · | 1.5 km | MPC · JPL |
| 153741 | 2001 UE_{145} | — | October 23, 2001 | Socorro | LINEAR | NYS | 1.1 km | MPC · JPL |
| 153742 | 2001 UG_{146} | — | October 23, 2001 | Socorro | LINEAR | · | 2.3 km | MPC · JPL |
| 153743 | 2001 UD_{153} | — | October 23, 2001 | Socorro | LINEAR | · | 2.3 km | MPC · JPL |
| 153744 | 2001 UU_{153} | — | October 23, 2001 | Socorro | LINEAR | (5) | 2.2 km | MPC · JPL |
| 153745 | 2001 UW_{153} | — | October 23, 2001 | Socorro | LINEAR | V | 1.4 km | MPC · JPL |
| 153746 | 2001 UF_{156} | — | October 23, 2001 | Socorro | LINEAR | · | 2.0 km | MPC · JPL |
| 153747 | 2001 UA_{158} | — | October 23, 2001 | Socorro | LINEAR | · | 2.0 km | MPC · JPL |
| 153748 | 2001 UB_{161} | — | October 23, 2001 | Socorro | LINEAR | NYS | 2.2 km | MPC · JPL |
| 153749 | 2001 UJ_{167} | — | October 19, 2001 | Socorro | LINEAR | · | 3.3 km | MPC · JPL |
| 153750 | 2001 UD_{168} | — | October 19, 2001 | Socorro | LINEAR | · | 2.8 km | MPC · JPL |
| 153751 | 2001 UQ_{168} | — | October 19, 2001 | Socorro | LINEAR | · | 3.2 km | MPC · JPL |
| 153752 | 2001 UZ_{173} | — | October 18, 2001 | Palomar | NEAT | NYS | 2.2 km | MPC · JPL |
| 153753 | 2001 UC_{184} | — | October 16, 2001 | Palomar | NEAT | · | 1.9 km | MPC · JPL |
| 153754 | 2001 UR_{196} | — | October 18, 2001 | Palomar | NEAT | · | 3.2 km | MPC · JPL |
| 153755 | 2001 UZ_{199} | — | October 19, 2001 | Palomar | NEAT | L5 | 10 km | MPC · JPL |
| 153756 | 2001 UF_{201} | — | October 19, 2001 | Palomar | NEAT | (5) | 1.5 km | MPC · JPL |
| 153757 | 2001 UN_{210} | — | October 21, 2001 | Emerald Lane | L. Ball | L5 | 10 km | MPC · JPL |
| 153758 | 2001 UQ_{214} | — | October 23, 2001 | Socorro | LINEAR | L5 | 15 km | MPC · JPL |
| 153759 | 2001 UX_{216} | — | October 24, 2001 | Kitt Peak | Spacewatch | · | 1.9 km | MPC · JPL |
| 153760 | 2001 UH_{221} | — | October 23, 2001 | Socorro | LINEAR | · | 1.8 km | MPC · JPL |
| 153761 | 2001 UB_{222} | — | October 25, 2001 | Socorro | LINEAR | · | 2.9 km | MPC · JPL |
| 153762 | 2001 VP_{1} | — | November 9, 2001 | Palomar | NEAT | V | 1.1 km | MPC · JPL |
| 153763 | 2001 VY_{10} | — | November 10, 2001 | Socorro | LINEAR | AGN | 1.8 km | MPC · JPL |
| 153764 | 2001 VZ_{11} | — | November 10, 2001 | Socorro | LINEAR | · | 2.1 km | MPC · JPL |
| 153765 | 2001 VF_{12} | — | November 10, 2001 | Socorro | LINEAR | RAF | 1.8 km | MPC · JPL |
| 153766 | 2001 VD_{14} | — | November 10, 2001 | Socorro | LINEAR | · | 1.8 km | MPC · JPL |
| 153767 | 2001 VC_{23} | — | November 9, 2001 | Socorro | LINEAR | · | 2.2 km | MPC · JPL |
| 153768 | 2001 VD_{27} | — | November 9, 2001 | Socorro | LINEAR | · | 3.4 km | MPC · JPL |
| 153769 | 2001 VJ_{29} | — | November 9, 2001 | Socorro | LINEAR | · | 2.7 km | MPC · JPL |
| 153770 | 2001 VO_{29} | — | November 9, 2001 | Socorro | LINEAR | · | 2.3 km | MPC · JPL |
| 153771 | 2001 VV_{33} | — | November 9, 2001 | Socorro | LINEAR | · | 4.0 km | MPC · JPL |
| 153772 | 2001 VQ_{34} | — | November 9, 2001 | Socorro | LINEAR | (5) | 2.2 km | MPC · JPL |
| 153773 | 2001 VL_{38} | — | November 9, 2001 | Socorro | LINEAR | (5) | 1.7 km | MPC · JPL |
| 153774 | 2001 VT_{38} | — | November 9, 2001 | Socorro | LINEAR | NYS | 2.1 km | MPC · JPL |
| 153775 | 2001 VY_{38} | — | November 9, 2001 | Socorro | LINEAR | · | 1.8 km | MPC · JPL |
| 153776 | 2001 VU_{41} | — | November 9, 2001 | Socorro | LINEAR | · | 3.4 km | MPC · JPL |
| 153777 | 2001 VK_{42} | — | November 9, 2001 | Socorro | LINEAR | MAR | 2.2 km | MPC · JPL |
| 153778 | 2001 VN_{45} | — | November 9, 2001 | Socorro | LINEAR | MAR | 2.9 km | MPC · JPL |
| 153779 | 2001 VO_{51} | — | November 10, 2001 | Socorro | LINEAR | · | 2.7 km | MPC · JPL |
| 153780 | 2001 VW_{57} | — | November 10, 2001 | Socorro | LINEAR | · | 1.8 km | MPC · JPL |
| 153781 | 2001 VD_{58} | — | November 10, 2001 | Socorro | LINEAR | · | 2.0 km | MPC · JPL |
| 153782 | 2001 VY_{58} | — | November 10, 2001 | Socorro | LINEAR | HNS | 1.6 km | MPC · JPL |
| 153783 | 2001 VQ_{60} | — | November 10, 2001 | Socorro | LINEAR | (5) | 2.2 km | MPC · JPL |
| 153784 | 2001 VY_{60} | — | November 10, 2001 | Socorro | LINEAR | · | 1.5 km | MPC · JPL |
| 153785 | 2001 VG_{64} | — | November 10, 2001 | Socorro | LINEAR | · | 2.5 km | MPC · JPL |
| 153786 | 2001 VH_{65} | — | November 10, 2001 | Socorro | LINEAR | (5) | 2.1 km | MPC · JPL |
| 153787 | 2001 VM_{65} | — | November 10, 2001 | Socorro | LINEAR | · | 2.0 km | MPC · JPL |
| 153788 | 2001 VU_{69} | — | November 11, 2001 | Socorro | LINEAR | EOS | 3.3 km | MPC · JPL |
| 153789 | 2001 VC_{70} | — | November 11, 2001 | Socorro | LINEAR | EUN | 2.1 km | MPC · JPL |
| 153790 | 2001 VJ_{71} | — | November 11, 2001 | Socorro | LINEAR | · | 4.8 km | MPC · JPL |
| 153791 | 2001 VZ_{73} | — | November 11, 2001 | Socorro | LINEAR | · | 1.6 km | MPC · JPL |
| 153792 | 2001 VH_{75} | — | November 12, 2001 | Socorro | LINEAR | APO +1km | 840 m | MPC · JPL |
| 153793 | 2001 VF_{78} | — | November 15, 2001 | Haleakala | NEAT | · | 4.3 km | MPC · JPL |
| 153794 | 2001 VZ_{78} | — | November 9, 2001 | Palomar | NEAT | · | 2.4 km | MPC · JPL |
| 153795 | 2001 VO_{79} | — | November 9, 2001 | Palomar | NEAT | · | 2.2 km | MPC · JPL |
| 153796 | 2001 VS_{79} | — | November 9, 2001 | Palomar | NEAT | · | 3.5 km | MPC · JPL |
| 153797 | 2001 VH_{95} | — | November 15, 2001 | Socorro | LINEAR | · | 3.3 km | MPC · JPL |
| 153798 | 2001 VR_{96} | — | November 15, 2001 | Socorro | LINEAR | ADE | 2.7 km | MPC · JPL |
| 153799 | 2001 VZ_{96} | — | November 15, 2001 | Socorro | LINEAR | · | 3.3 km | MPC · JPL |
| 153800 | 2001 VT_{97} | — | November 15, 2001 | Socorro | LINEAR | · | 3.5 km | MPC · JPL |

== 153801–153900 ==
back to top

| Designation | | | Discovery | | | Properties | | Ref |
| Permanent | Provisional | Named after | Date | Site | Discoverer(s) | Category | Diam. | Ref |
|---|---|---|---|---|---|---|---|---|
| 153801 | 2001 VV_{106} | — | November 12, 2001 | Socorro | LINEAR | · | 1.8 km | MPC · JPL |
| 153802 | 2001 VY_{109} | — | November 12, 2001 | Socorro | LINEAR | MAS | 1.2 km | MPC · JPL |
| 153803 | 2001 VO_{110} | — | November 12, 2001 | Socorro | LINEAR | · | 2.1 km | MPC · JPL |
| 153804 | 2001 VO_{113} | — | November 12, 2001 | Socorro | LINEAR | NYS | 2.3 km | MPC · JPL |
| 153805 | 2001 VO_{114} | — | November 12, 2001 | Socorro | LINEAR | · | 1.5 km | MPC · JPL |
| 153806 | 2001 VC_{116} | — | November 12, 2001 | Socorro | LINEAR | · | 2.2 km | MPC · JPL |
| 153807 | 2001 VJ_{116} | — | November 12, 2001 | Socorro | LINEAR | · | 2.7 km | MPC · JPL |
| 153808 | 2001 VS_{116} | — | November 12, 2001 | Socorro | LINEAR | MAR | 1.7 km | MPC · JPL |
| 153809 | 2001 VP_{118} | — | November 12, 2001 | Socorro | LINEAR | · | 3.9 km | MPC · JPL |
| 153810 | 2001 VK_{119} | — | November 12, 2001 | Socorro | LINEAR | · | 2.8 km | MPC · JPL |
| 153811 | 2001 VL_{119} | — | November 12, 2001 | Socorro | LINEAR | (5) | 2.2 km | MPC · JPL |
| 153812 | 2001 VJ_{120} | — | November 12, 2001 | Socorro | LINEAR | · | 2.8 km | MPC · JPL |
| 153813 | 2001 WE | — | November 16, 2001 | Bisei SG Center | BATTeRS | · | 2.3 km | MPC · JPL |
| 153814 | 2001 WN_{5} | — | November 20, 2001 | Anderson Mesa | LONEOS | APO +1km · PHA | 930 m | MPC · JPL |
| 153815 | 2001 WC_{7} | — | November 17, 2001 | Socorro | LINEAR | · | 2.3 km | MPC · JPL |
| 153816 | 2001 WU_{8} | — | November 17, 2001 | Socorro | LINEAR | NYS | 1.7 km | MPC · JPL |
| 153817 | 2001 WP_{9} | — | November 17, 2001 | Socorro | LINEAR | · | 2.2 km | MPC · JPL |
| 153818 | 2001 WP_{10} | — | November 17, 2001 | Socorro | LINEAR | · | 1.6 km | MPC · JPL |
| 153819 | 2001 WX_{14} | — | November 17, 2001 | Kitt Peak | Spacewatch | MIS | 3.9 km | MPC · JPL |
| 153820 | 2001 WO_{20} | — | November 17, 2001 | Socorro | LINEAR | · | 1.6 km | MPC · JPL |
| 153821 | 2001 WS_{31} | — | November 17, 2001 | Socorro | LINEAR | LEO | 2.4 km | MPC · JPL |
| 153822 | 2001 WH_{37} | — | November 17, 2001 | Socorro | LINEAR | · | 2.2 km | MPC · JPL |
| 153823 | 2001 WU_{37} | — | November 17, 2001 | Socorro | LINEAR | · | 1.5 km | MPC · JPL |
| 153824 | 2001 WN_{45} | — | November 19, 2001 | Socorro | LINEAR | · | 1.5 km | MPC · JPL |
| 153825 | 2001 WX_{48} | — | November 17, 2001 | Kitt Peak | Spacewatch | · | 1.7 km | MPC · JPL |
| 153826 | 2001 WS_{50} | — | November 17, 2001 | Socorro | LINEAR | · | 1.3 km | MPC · JPL |
| 153827 | 2001 WF_{51} | — | November 19, 2001 | Socorro | LINEAR | · | 2.0 km | MPC · JPL |
| 153828 | 2001 WT_{70} | — | November 20, 2001 | Socorro | LINEAR | · | 1.8 km | MPC · JPL |
| 153829 | 2001 WQ_{76} | — | November 20, 2001 | Socorro | LINEAR | · | 2.2 km | MPC · JPL |
| 153830 | 2001 WQ_{79} | — | November 20, 2001 | Socorro | LINEAR | · | 1.8 km | MPC · JPL |
| 153831 | 2001 WC_{80} | — | November 20, 2001 | Socorro | LINEAR | · | 1.4 km | MPC · JPL |
| 153832 | 2001 WW_{100} | — | November 16, 2001 | Kitt Peak | Spacewatch | NYS | 2.2 km | MPC · JPL |
| 153833 | 2001 XB_{4} | — | December 9, 2001 | Socorro | LINEAR | · | 4.6 km | MPC · JPL |
| 153834 | 2001 XD_{6} | — | December 7, 2001 | Socorro | LINEAR | · | 1.6 km | MPC · JPL |
| 153835 | 2001 XD_{10} | — | December 9, 2001 | Socorro | LINEAR | (5) | 1.7 km | MPC · JPL |
| 153836 | 2001 XB_{12} | — | December 9, 2001 | Socorro | LINEAR | ADE | 3.4 km | MPC · JPL |
| 153837 | 2001 XD_{13} | — | December 9, 2001 | Socorro | LINEAR | · | 3.5 km | MPC · JPL |
| 153838 | 2001 XG_{17} | — | December 9, 2001 | Socorro | LINEAR | · | 2.6 km | MPC · JPL |
| 153839 | 2001 XS_{20} | — | December 9, 2001 | Socorro | LINEAR | JUN | 2.4 km | MPC · JPL |
| 153840 | 2001 XZ_{20} | — | December 9, 2001 | Socorro | LINEAR | · | 2.3 km | MPC · JPL |
| 153841 | 2001 XL_{23} | — | December 9, 2001 | Socorro | LINEAR | · | 4.2 km | MPC · JPL |
| 153842 | 2001 XT_{30} | — | December 11, 2001 | Socorro | LINEAR | AMO +1km | 1.8 km | MPC · JPL |
| 153843 | 2001 XF_{32} | — | December 7, 2001 | Kitt Peak | Spacewatch | MAS | 1.2 km | MPC · JPL |
| 153844 | 2001 XV_{36} | — | December 9, 2001 | Socorro | LINEAR | · | 4.1 km | MPC · JPL |
| 153845 | 2001 XX_{38} | — | December 9, 2001 | Socorro | LINEAR | · | 3.4 km | MPC · JPL |
| 153846 | 2001 XL_{42} | — | December 9, 2001 | Socorro | LINEAR | · | 4.0 km | MPC · JPL |
| 153847 | 2001 XU_{42} | — | December 9, 2001 | Socorro | LINEAR | EUN | 2.1 km | MPC · JPL |
| 153848 | 2001 XY_{43} | — | December 9, 2001 | Socorro | LINEAR | · | 4.8 km | MPC · JPL |
| 153849 | 2001 XC_{45} | — | December 9, 2001 | Socorro | LINEAR | EUN | 2.6 km | MPC · JPL |
| 153850 | 2001 XS_{46} | — | December 9, 2001 | Socorro | LINEAR | · | 4.8 km | MPC · JPL |
| 153851 | 2001 XL_{47} | — | December 9, 2001 | Socorro | LINEAR | · | 3.8 km | MPC · JPL |
| 153852 | 2001 XH_{52} | — | December 10, 2001 | Socorro | LINEAR | (5) | 1.8 km | MPC · JPL |
| 153853 | 2001 XP_{52} | — | December 10, 2001 | Socorro | LINEAR | · | 2.8 km | MPC · JPL |
| 153854 | 2001 XS_{52} | — | December 10, 2001 | Socorro | LINEAR | · | 2.2 km | MPC · JPL |
| 153855 | 2001 XK_{53} | — | December 10, 2001 | Socorro | LINEAR | EUN | 2.3 km | MPC · JPL |
| 153856 | 2001 XD_{54} | — | December 10, 2001 | Socorro | LINEAR | MAS | 1.6 km | MPC · JPL |
| 153857 | 2001 XJ_{62} | — | December 10, 2001 | Socorro | LINEAR | EUN | 2.2 km | MPC · JPL |
| 153858 | 2001 XE_{64} | — | December 10, 2001 | Socorro | LINEAR | · | 2.8 km | MPC · JPL |
| 153859 | 2001 XB_{65} | — | December 10, 2001 | Socorro | LINEAR | · | 3.4 km | MPC · JPL |
| 153860 | 2001 XE_{65} | — | December 10, 2001 | Socorro | LINEAR | fast | 2.1 km | MPC · JPL |
| 153861 | 2001 XL_{69} | — | December 11, 2001 | Socorro | LINEAR | · | 2.3 km | MPC · JPL |
| 153862 | 2001 XK_{71} | — | December 11, 2001 | Socorro | LINEAR | · | 2.7 km | MPC · JPL |
| 153863 | 2001 XV_{71} | — | December 11, 2001 | Socorro | LINEAR | · | 2.0 km | MPC · JPL |
| 153864 | 2001 XT_{72} | — | December 11, 2001 | Socorro | LINEAR | MAR | 2.0 km | MPC · JPL |
| 153865 | 2001 XX_{74} | — | December 11, 2001 | Socorro | LINEAR | · | 2.3 km | MPC · JPL |
| 153866 | 2001 XQ_{78} | — | December 11, 2001 | Socorro | LINEAR | RAF | 1.6 km | MPC · JPL |
| 153867 | 2001 XC_{79} | — | December 11, 2001 | Socorro | LINEAR | · | 2.1 km | MPC · JPL |
| 153868 | 2001 XR_{83} | — | December 11, 2001 | Socorro | LINEAR | · | 4.0 km | MPC · JPL |
| 153869 | 2001 XE_{85} | — | December 11, 2001 | Socorro | LINEAR | · | 2.0 km | MPC · JPL |
| 153870 | 2001 XD_{87} | — | December 13, 2001 | Socorro | LINEAR | (5) | 2.9 km | MPC · JPL |
| 153871 | 2001 XQ_{88} | — | December 10, 2001 | Uccle | T. Pauwels | · | 2.2 km | MPC · JPL |
| 153872 | 2001 XC_{90} | — | December 10, 2001 | Socorro | LINEAR | MAR | 1.7 km | MPC · JPL |
| 153873 | 2001 XY_{91} | — | December 10, 2001 | Socorro | LINEAR | · | 2.6 km | MPC · JPL |
| 153874 | 2001 XN_{102} | — | December 11, 2001 | Socorro | LINEAR | H | 800 m | MPC · JPL |
| 153875 | 2001 XL_{103} | — | December 14, 2001 | Socorro | LINEAR | H | 1.0 km | MPC · JPL |
| 153876 | 2001 XR_{121} | — | December 14, 2001 | Socorro | LINEAR | · | 1.4 km | MPC · JPL |
| 153877 | 2001 XB_{131} | — | December 14, 2001 | Socorro | LINEAR | · | 4.1 km | MPC · JPL |
| 153878 | 2001 XM_{141} | — | December 14, 2001 | Socorro | LINEAR | · | 1.7 km | MPC · JPL |
| 153879 | 2001 XY_{141} | — | December 14, 2001 | Socorro | LINEAR | · | 2.3 km | MPC · JPL |
| 153880 | 2001 XG_{148} | — | December 14, 2001 | Socorro | LINEAR | · | 2.5 km | MPC · JPL |
| 153881 | 2001 XH_{148} | — | December 14, 2001 | Socorro | LINEAR | NYS | 2.8 km | MPC · JPL |
| 153882 | 2001 XW_{148} | — | December 14, 2001 | Socorro | LINEAR | · | 2.9 km | MPC · JPL |
| 153883 | 2001 XQ_{153} | — | December 14, 2001 | Socorro | LINEAR | · | 2.3 km | MPC · JPL |
| 153884 | 2001 XO_{158} | — | December 14, 2001 | Socorro | LINEAR | · | 2.4 km | MPC · JPL |
| 153885 | 2001 XN_{163} | — | December 14, 2001 | Socorro | LINEAR | · | 2.3 km | MPC · JPL |
| 153886 | 2001 XR_{171} | — | December 14, 2001 | Socorro | LINEAR | · | 2.8 km | MPC · JPL |
| 153887 | 2001 XC_{172} | — | December 14, 2001 | Socorro | LINEAR | · | 1.9 km | MPC · JPL |
| 153888 | 2001 XU_{178} | — | December 14, 2001 | Socorro | LINEAR | · | 3.1 km | MPC · JPL |
| 153889 | 2001 XJ_{185} | — | December 14, 2001 | Socorro | LINEAR | · | 3.3 km | MPC · JPL |
| 153890 | 2001 XL_{188} | — | December 14, 2001 | Socorro | LINEAR | EUN | 2.7 km | MPC · JPL |
| 153891 | 2001 XZ_{193} | — | December 14, 2001 | Socorro | LINEAR | NEM | 3.8 km | MPC · JPL |
| 153892 | 2001 XE_{196} | — | December 14, 2001 | Socorro | LINEAR | · | 2.7 km | MPC · JPL |
| 153893 | 2001 XC_{197} | — | December 14, 2001 | Socorro | LINEAR | · | 4.4 km | MPC · JPL |
| 153894 | 2001 XT_{198} | — | December 14, 2001 | Socorro | LINEAR | MIS | 3.6 km | MPC · JPL |
| 153895 | 2001 XF_{206} | — | December 11, 2001 | Socorro | LINEAR | · | 2.2 km | MPC · JPL |
| 153896 | 2001 XT_{206} | — | December 11, 2001 | Socorro | LINEAR | · | 2.1 km | MPC · JPL |
| 153897 | 2001 XV_{206} | — | December 11, 2001 | Socorro | LINEAR | (5) | 2.0 km | MPC · JPL |
| 153898 | 2001 XT_{210} | — | December 11, 2001 | Socorro | LINEAR | · | 3.3 km | MPC · JPL |
| 153899 | 2001 XJ_{215} | — | December 13, 2001 | Socorro | LINEAR | · | 2.8 km | MPC · JPL |
| 153900 | 2001 XZ_{216} | — | December 14, 2001 | Socorro | LINEAR | · | 2.3 km | MPC · JPL |

== 153901–154000 ==
back to top

| Designation | | | Discovery | | | Properties | | Ref |
| Permanent | Provisional | Named after | Date | Site | Discoverer(s) | Category | Diam. | Ref |
|---|---|---|---|---|---|---|---|---|
| 153901 | 2001 XB_{219} | — | December 15, 2001 | Socorro | LINEAR | · | 1.6 km | MPC · JPL |
| 153902 | 2001 XV_{221} | — | December 15, 2001 | Socorro | LINEAR | · | 2.0 km | MPC · JPL |
| 153903 | 2001 XR_{227} | — | December 15, 2001 | Socorro | LINEAR | · | 2.1 km | MPC · JPL |
| 153904 | 2001 XV_{232} | — | December 15, 2001 | Socorro | LINEAR | (5) | 2.0 km | MPC · JPL |
| 153905 | 2001 XC_{234} | — | December 15, 2001 | Socorro | LINEAR | (5) | 1.7 km | MPC · JPL |
| 153906 | 2001 XM_{234} | — | December 15, 2001 | Socorro | LINEAR | · | 2.4 km | MPC · JPL |
| 153907 | 2001 XK_{236} | — | December 15, 2001 | Socorro | LINEAR | · | 2.2 km | MPC · JPL |
| 153908 | 2001 XA_{237} | — | December 15, 2001 | Socorro | LINEAR | · | 2.2 km | MPC · JPL |
| 153909 | 2001 XF_{238} | — | December 15, 2001 | Socorro | LINEAR | (5) | 2.0 km | MPC · JPL |
| 153910 | 2001 XO_{239} | — | December 15, 2001 | Socorro | LINEAR | · | 3.2 km | MPC · JPL |
| 153911 | 2001 XL_{241} | — | December 14, 2001 | Socorro | LINEAR | · | 1.8 km | MPC · JPL |
| 153912 | 2001 XG_{243} | — | December 14, 2001 | Socorro | LINEAR | · | 3.1 km | MPC · JPL |
| 153913 | 2001 XO_{246} | — | December 15, 2001 | Socorro | LINEAR | · | 1.7 km | MPC · JPL |
| 153914 | 2001 XV_{248} | — | December 14, 2001 | Cima Ekar | ADAS | · | 1.9 km | MPC · JPL |
| 153915 | 2001 XE_{252} | — | December 14, 2001 | Socorro | LINEAR | · | 2.5 km | MPC · JPL |
| 153916 | 2001 XA_{257} | — | December 7, 2001 | Socorro | LINEAR | EUN | 2.0 km | MPC · JPL |
| 153917 | 2001 YK_{9} | — | December 17, 2001 | Socorro | LINEAR | · | 4.3 km | MPC · JPL |
| 153918 | 2001 YO_{12} | — | December 17, 2001 | Socorro | LINEAR | · | 2.1 km | MPC · JPL |
| 153919 | 2001 YU_{18} | — | December 17, 2001 | Socorro | LINEAR | NEM | 3.7 km | MPC · JPL |
| 153920 | 2001 YW_{20} | — | December 18, 2001 | Socorro | LINEAR | · | 1.7 km | MPC · JPL |
| 153921 | 2001 YZ_{22} | — | December 18, 2001 | Socorro | LINEAR | · | 1.6 km | MPC · JPL |
| 153922 | 2001 YQ_{26} | — | December 18, 2001 | Socorro | LINEAR | · | 1.8 km | MPC · JPL |
| 153923 | 2001 YW_{41} | — | December 18, 2001 | Socorro | LINEAR | · | 2.9 km | MPC · JPL |
| 153924 | 2001 YF_{53} | — | December 18, 2001 | Socorro | LINEAR | · | 2.4 km | MPC · JPL |
| 153925 | 2001 YT_{54} | — | December 18, 2001 | Socorro | LINEAR | MIS | 3.1 km | MPC · JPL |
| 153926 | 2001 YL_{59} | — | December 18, 2001 | Socorro | LINEAR | · | 2.6 km | MPC · JPL |
| 153927 | 2001 YT_{59} | — | December 18, 2001 | Socorro | LINEAR | NYS | 1.9 km | MPC · JPL |
| 153928 | 2001 YB_{61} | — | December 18, 2001 | Socorro | LINEAR | · | 2.6 km | MPC · JPL |
| 153929 | 2001 YJ_{63} | — | December 18, 2001 | Socorro | LINEAR | · | 2.7 km | MPC · JPL |
| 153930 | 2001 YG_{66} | — | December 18, 2001 | Socorro | LINEAR | · | 6.3 km | MPC · JPL |
| 153931 | 2001 YA_{68} | — | December 18, 2001 | Socorro | LINEAR | · | 2.8 km | MPC · JPL |
| 153932 | 2001 YJ_{70} | — | December 18, 2001 | Socorro | LINEAR | ADE | 5.7 km | MPC · JPL |
| 153933 | 2001 YR_{71} | — | December 18, 2001 | Socorro | LINEAR | · | 2.5 km | MPC · JPL |
| 153934 | 2001 YD_{74} | — | December 18, 2001 | Socorro | LINEAR | · | 2.5 km | MPC · JPL |
| 153935 | 2001 YC_{80} | — | December 18, 2001 | Socorro | LINEAR | · | 3.4 km | MPC · JPL |
| 153936 | 2001 YJ_{89} | — | December 18, 2001 | Socorro | LINEAR | · | 2.4 km | MPC · JPL |
| 153937 | 2001 YG_{97} | — | December 17, 2001 | Socorro | LINEAR | EUN | 2.6 km | MPC · JPL |
| 153938 | 2001 YJ_{105} | — | December 17, 2001 | Socorro | LINEAR | · | 2.4 km | MPC · JPL |
| 153939 | 2001 YW_{110} | — | December 18, 2001 | Palomar | NEAT | · | 2.1 km | MPC · JPL |
| 153940 | 2001 YD_{118} | — | December 18, 2001 | Socorro | LINEAR | · | 4.0 km | MPC · JPL |
| 153941 | 2001 YM_{121} | — | December 17, 2001 | Socorro | LINEAR | · | 2.4 km | MPC · JPL |
| 153942 | 2001 YD_{122} | — | December 17, 2001 | Socorro | LINEAR | · | 2.8 km | MPC · JPL |
| 153943 | 2001 YH_{127} | — | December 17, 2001 | Socorro | LINEAR | · | 2.3 km | MPC · JPL |
| 153944 | 2001 YN_{127} | — | December 17, 2001 | Socorro | LINEAR | (5) | 2.0 km | MPC · JPL |
| 153945 | 2001 YP_{127} | — | December 17, 2001 | Socorro | LINEAR | · | 1.6 km | MPC · JPL |
| 153946 | 2001 YS_{129} | — | December 17, 2001 | Socorro | LINEAR | WIT | 1.7 km | MPC · JPL |
| 153947 | 2001 YG_{131} | — | December 18, 2001 | Socorro | LINEAR | · | 2.3 km | MPC · JPL |
| 153948 | 2001 YX_{134} | — | December 19, 2001 | Socorro | LINEAR | · | 2.2 km | MPC · JPL |
| 153949 | 2001 YY_{148} | — | December 18, 2001 | Socorro | LINEAR | · | 3.5 km | MPC · JPL |
| 153950 | 2001 YL_{156} | — | December 20, 2001 | Palomar | NEAT | · | 2.7 km | MPC · JPL |
| 153951 | 2002 AC_{3} | — | January 7, 2002 | Socorro | LINEAR | AMO | 630 m | MPC · JPL |
| 153952 | 2002 AZ_{5} | — | January 4, 2002 | Palomar | NEAT | · | 2.1 km | MPC · JPL |
| 153953 | 2002 AD_{9} | — | January 9, 2002 | Socorro | LINEAR | APO +1km | 1.5 km | MPC · JPL |
| 153954 | 2002 AL_{9} | — | January 11, 2002 | Desert Eagle | W. K. Y. Yeung | H | 1.0 km | MPC · JPL |
| 153955 | 2002 AA_{20} | — | January 5, 2002 | Haleakala | NEAT | · | 2.7 km | MPC · JPL |
| 153956 | 2002 AG_{27} | — | January 12, 2002 | Cima Ekar | ADAS | ADE | 2.9 km | MPC · JPL |
| 153957 | 2002 AB_{29} | — | January 13, 2002 | Socorro | LINEAR | T_{j} (2.68) · APO +1km | 1 km | MPC · JPL |
| 153958 | 2002 AM_{31} | — | January 14, 2002 | Socorro | LINEAR | APO · PHA · moon | 760 m | MPC · JPL |
| 153959 | 2002 AC_{34} | — | January 12, 2002 | Kitt Peak | Spacewatch | AEO | 1.3 km | MPC · JPL |
| 153960 | 2002 AT_{35} | — | January 8, 2002 | Socorro | LINEAR | · | 2.4 km | MPC · JPL |
| 153961 | 2002 AZ_{39} | — | January 9, 2002 | Socorro | LINEAR | · | 3.6 km | MPC · JPL |
| 153962 | 2002 AT_{40} | — | January 9, 2002 | Socorro | LINEAR | MIS | 4.6 km | MPC · JPL |
| 153963 | 2002 AW_{41} | — | January 9, 2002 | Socorro | LINEAR | · | 2.4 km | MPC · JPL |
| 153964 | 2002 AP_{42} | — | January 9, 2002 | Socorro | LINEAR | · | 2.0 km | MPC · JPL |
| 153965 | 2002 AV_{47} | — | January 9, 2002 | Socorro | LINEAR | · | 2.9 km | MPC · JPL |
| 153966 | 2002 AU_{49} | — | January 9, 2002 | Socorro | LINEAR | · | 2.9 km | MPC · JPL |
| 153967 | 2002 AC_{53} | — | January 9, 2002 | Socorro | LINEAR | EOS | 4.0 km | MPC · JPL |
| 153968 | 2002 AE_{58} | — | January 9, 2002 | Socorro | LINEAR | · | 2.8 km | MPC · JPL |
| 153969 | 2002 AL_{59} | — | January 9, 2002 | Socorro | LINEAR | · | 3.7 km | MPC · JPL |
| 153970 | 2002 AJ_{79} | — | January 8, 2002 | Socorro | LINEAR | · | 4.0 km | MPC · JPL |
| 153971 | 2002 AT_{80} | — | January 9, 2002 | Socorro | LINEAR | · | 2.9 km | MPC · JPL |
| 153972 | 2002 AD_{81} | — | January 9, 2002 | Socorro | LINEAR | · | 3.2 km | MPC · JPL |
| 153973 | 2002 AH_{82} | — | January 9, 2002 | Socorro | LINEAR | · | 2.7 km | MPC · JPL |
| 153974 | 2002 AV_{87} | — | January 9, 2002 | Socorro | LINEAR | · | 3.3 km | MPC · JPL |
| 153975 | 2002 AV_{93} | — | January 8, 2002 | Socorro | LINEAR | · | 2.0 km | MPC · JPL |
| 153976 | 2002 AX_{101} | — | January 8, 2002 | Socorro | LINEAR | (13314) | 2.3 km | MPC · JPL |
| 153977 | 2002 AG_{106} | — | January 9, 2002 | Socorro | LINEAR | · | 1.8 km | MPC · JPL |
| 153978 | 2002 AE_{111} | — | January 9, 2002 | Socorro | LINEAR | NEM | 3.9 km | MPC · JPL |
| 153979 | 2002 AQ_{111} | — | January 9, 2002 | Socorro | LINEAR | · | 2.9 km | MPC · JPL |
| 153980 | 2002 AG_{112} | — | January 9, 2002 | Socorro | LINEAR | · | 6.6 km | MPC · JPL |
| 153981 | 2002 AO_{119} | — | January 9, 2002 | Socorro | LINEAR | · | 3.1 km | MPC · JPL |
| 153982 | 2002 AM_{120} | — | January 9, 2002 | Socorro | LINEAR | · | 4.6 km | MPC · JPL |
| 153983 | 2002 AC_{121} | — | January 9, 2002 | Socorro | LINEAR | · | 3.1 km | MPC · JPL |
| 153984 | 2002 AF_{131} | — | January 12, 2002 | Palomar | NEAT | · | 3.5 km | MPC · JPL |
| 153985 | 2002 AT_{132} | — | January 8, 2002 | Socorro | LINEAR | · | 2.4 km | MPC · JPL |
| 153986 | 2002 AT_{139} | — | January 13, 2002 | Socorro | LINEAR | · | 1.9 km | MPC · JPL |
| 153987 | 2002 AS_{150} | — | January 14, 2002 | Socorro | LINEAR | AEO | 1.7 km | MPC · JPL |
| 153988 | 2002 AF_{153} | — | January 14, 2002 | Socorro | LINEAR | · | 3.9 km | MPC · JPL |
| 153989 | 2002 AB_{157} | — | January 13, 2002 | Socorro | LINEAR | · | 4.8 km | MPC · JPL |
| 153990 | 2002 AH_{157} | — | January 13, 2002 | Socorro | LINEAR | · | 3.0 km | MPC · JPL |
| 153991 | 2002 AY_{162} | — | January 13, 2002 | Socorro | LINEAR | · | 3.7 km | MPC · JPL |
| 153992 | 2002 AT_{164} | — | January 13, 2002 | Socorro | LINEAR | · | 3.6 km | MPC · JPL |
| 153993 | 2002 AT_{165} | — | January 13, 2002 | Socorro | LINEAR | · | 3.3 km | MPC · JPL |
| 153994 | 2002 AM_{169} | — | January 14, 2002 | Socorro | LINEAR | THM | 2.9 km | MPC · JPL |
| 153995 | 2002 AK_{173} | — | January 14, 2002 | Socorro | LINEAR | · | 2.7 km | MPC · JPL |
| 153996 | 2002 AZ_{174} | — | January 14, 2002 | Socorro | LINEAR | · | 3.8 km | MPC · JPL |
| 153997 | 2002 AV_{176} | — | January 14, 2002 | Socorro | LINEAR | · | 4.4 km | MPC · JPL |
| 153998 | 2002 AC_{181} | — | January 5, 2002 | Palomar | NEAT | EUN | 2.9 km | MPC · JPL |
| 153999 | 2002 AC_{183} | — | January 5, 2002 | Anderson Mesa | LONEOS | EUN | 2.8 km | MPC · JPL |
| 154000 | 2002 AM_{187} | — | January 8, 2002 | Socorro | LINEAR | · | 3.7 km | MPC · JPL |

back to top

== See also ==
- Meanings of minor-planet names: 153001–154000
