= List of minor planets: 475001–476000 =

The following is a partial list of minor planets, running from minor-planet number 475001 through 476000, inclusive. The primary data for this and other partial lists is based on JPL's "Small-Body Orbital Elements" and data available from the Minor Planet Center. Critical list information is also provided by the MPC, unless otherwise specified from Lowell Observatory. A detailed description of the table's columns and additional sources are given on the main page including a complete list of every page in this series, and a statistical break-up on the dynamical classification of minor planets.

Also see the summary list of all named bodies in numerical and alphabetical order, and the corresponding naming citations for the number range of this particular list. New namings may only be added to this list after official publication, as the preannouncement of names is condemned by the Working Group for Small Bodies Nomenclature of the International Astronomical Union.

Near-Earth obj.	MBA (inner)	MBA (outer)	Centaur
Mars-crosser	MBA (middle)	Jupiter trojan	Trans-Neptunian obj.
Unclassified

== 475001–475100 ==
Designation			Discovery			Properties		Ref
Permanent	Provisional	Named after	Date	Site	Discoverer(s)	Category	Diam.	Ref
475001	2005 TX_{155}	—	October 7, 2005	Kitt Peak	Spacewatch	·	2.5 km	MPC · JPL
475002	2005 TN_{157}	—	September 25, 2005	Kitt Peak	Spacewatch	·	2.2 km	MPC · JPL
475003	2005 TO_{160}	—	October 9, 2005	Kitt Peak	Spacewatch	·	3.0 km	MPC · JPL
475004	2005 TK_{161}	—	September 23, 2005	Kitt Peak	Spacewatch	·	2.6 km	MPC · JPL
475005	2005 TX_{161}	—	September 26, 2005	Kitt Peak	Spacewatch	·	2.3 km	MPC · JPL
475006	2005 TE_{162}	—	September 23, 2005	Kitt Peak	Spacewatch	·	1.9 km	MPC · JPL
475007	2005 TF_{163}	—	October 9, 2005	Kitt Peak	Spacewatch	·	2.4 km	MPC · JPL
475008	2005 TG_{165}	—	October 9, 2005	Kitt Peak	Spacewatch	VER	2.3 km	MPC · JPL
475009	2005 TV_{167}	—	October 9, 2005	Kitt Peak	Spacewatch	·	2.2 km	MPC · JPL
475010	2005 TX_{168}	—	October 9, 2005	Kitt Peak	Spacewatch	NYS	950 m	MPC · JPL
475011	2005 TG_{176}	—	October 1, 2005	Kitt Peak	Spacewatch	·	810 m	MPC · JPL
475012	2005 TR_{176}	—	October 1, 2005	Mount Lemmon	Mount Lemmon Survey	T_{j} (2.95)	2.5 km	MPC · JPL
475013	2005 TF_{181}	—	October 1, 2005	Mount Lemmon	Mount Lemmon Survey	·	2.3 km	MPC · JPL
475014	2005 TM_{191}	—	October 1, 2005	Mount Lemmon	Mount Lemmon Survey	·	970 m	MPC · JPL
475015	2005 TN_{191}	—	October 1, 2005	Mount Lemmon	Mount Lemmon Survey	THM	2.0 km	MPC · JPL
475016	2005 UO	—	October 23, 2005	Catalina	CSS	APO	160 m	MPC · JPL
475017	2005 UC_{8}	—	October 26, 2005	Ottmarsheim	C. Rinner	·	4.7 km	MPC · JPL
475018	2005 UU_{8}	—	October 20, 2005	Palomar	NEAT	T_{j} (2.97)	4.8 km	MPC · JPL
475019	2005 UB_{9}	—	October 21, 2005	Palomar	NEAT	·	1.8 km	MPC · JPL
475020	2005 UN_{10}	—	October 21, 2005	Palomar	NEAT	·	1.0 km	MPC · JPL
475021	2005 UA_{15}	—	October 22, 2005	Kitt Peak	Spacewatch	·	3.1 km	MPC · JPL
475022	2005 UD_{17}	—	October 22, 2005	Kitt Peak	Spacewatch	·	1.1 km	MPC · JPL
475023	2005 UY_{17}	—	October 22, 2005	Catalina	CSS	NYS	840 m	MPC · JPL
475024	2005 UX_{20}	—	October 23, 2005	Kitt Peak	Spacewatch	·	2.4 km	MPC · JPL
475025	2005 UB_{23}	—	October 23, 2005	Kitt Peak	Spacewatch	·	2.8 km	MPC · JPL
475026	2005 UX_{24}	—	September 30, 2005	Mount Lemmon	Mount Lemmon Survey	·	2.1 km	MPC · JPL
475027	2005 US_{25}	—	October 23, 2005	Kitt Peak	Spacewatch	·	1.9 km	MPC · JPL
475028	2005 UF_{27}	—	September 30, 2005	Mount Lemmon	Mount Lemmon Survey	MAS	680 m	MPC · JPL
475029	2005 UN_{27}	—	October 23, 2005	Catalina	CSS	·	2.8 km	MPC · JPL
475030	2005 UY_{27}	—	October 12, 2005	Kitt Peak	Spacewatch	·	1.2 km	MPC · JPL
475031	2005 UM_{28}	—	October 23, 2005	Kitt Peak	Spacewatch	THM	2.1 km	MPC · JPL
475032	2005 UP_{33}	—	October 24, 2005	Kitt Peak	Spacewatch	·	2.4 km	MPC · JPL
475033	2005 UN_{37}	—	October 24, 2005	Kitt Peak	Spacewatch	·	1.1 km	MPC · JPL
475034	2005 UW_{38}	—	October 24, 2005	Kitt Peak	Spacewatch	·	800 m	MPC · JPL
475035	2005 UH_{39}	—	October 24, 2005	Kitt Peak	Spacewatch	·	2.7 km	MPC · JPL
475036	2005 UH_{47}	—	October 22, 2005	Catalina	CSS	NYS	1.1 km	MPC · JPL
475037	2005 UY_{47}	—	October 22, 2005	Catalina	CSS	·	1.1 km	MPC · JPL
475038	2005 UV_{57}	—	October 24, 2005	Kitt Peak	Spacewatch	NYS	930 m	MPC · JPL
475039	2005 UL_{58}	—	October 24, 2005	Kitt Peak	Spacewatch	·	2.6 km	MPC · JPL
475040	2005 UP_{59}	—	October 25, 2005	Kitt Peak	Spacewatch	MAS	720 m	MPC · JPL
475041	2005 UH_{62}	—	September 30, 2005	Mount Lemmon	Mount Lemmon Survey	MAS	630 m	MPC · JPL
475042	2005 UO_{62}	—	October 25, 2005	Mount Lemmon	Mount Lemmon Survey	·	920 m	MPC · JPL
475043	2005 UK_{67}	—	October 1, 2005	Mount Lemmon	Mount Lemmon Survey	MAS	710 m	MPC · JPL
475044	2005 UD_{70}	—	October 10, 2005	Catalina	CSS	·	2.2 km	MPC · JPL
475045	2005 UG_{70}	—	September 29, 2005	Catalina	CSS	·	1.5 km	MPC · JPL
475046	2005 UF_{72}	—	October 23, 2005	Catalina	CSS	·	2.8 km	MPC · JPL
475047	2005 UK_{85}	—	October 22, 2005	Kitt Peak	Spacewatch	THM	1.9 km	MPC · JPL
475048	2005 UT_{86}	—	October 1, 2005	Mount Lemmon	Mount Lemmon Survey	THM	2.4 km	MPC · JPL
475049	2005 UC_{92}	—	September 5, 1999	Kitt Peak	Spacewatch	HYG	2.2 km	MPC · JPL
475050	2005 UR_{96}	—	October 22, 2005	Kitt Peak	Spacewatch	·	2.5 km	MPC · JPL
475051	2005 UU_{97}	—	October 22, 2005	Kitt Peak	Spacewatch	·	960 m	MPC · JPL
475052	2005 UD_{98}	—	October 22, 2005	Kitt Peak	Spacewatch	·	3.0 km	MPC · JPL
475053	2005 UV_{101}	—	October 22, 2005	Kitt Peak	Spacewatch	·	2.6 km	MPC · JPL
475054	2005 UA_{102}	—	October 22, 2005	Kitt Peak	Spacewatch	NYS	930 m	MPC · JPL
475055	2005 UV_{103}	—	October 22, 2005	Kitt Peak	Spacewatch	·	2.5 km	MPC · JPL
475056	2005 UH_{104}	—	October 22, 2005	Kitt Peak	Spacewatch	HYG	2.4 km	MPC · JPL
475057	2005 UR_{106}	—	October 22, 2005	Kitt Peak	Spacewatch	·	2.2 km	MPC · JPL
475058	2005 UD_{114}	—	October 22, 2005	Kitt Peak	Spacewatch	·	970 m	MPC · JPL
475059	2005 UW_{115}	—	October 23, 2005	Catalina	CSS	·	3.3 km	MPC · JPL
475060	2005 UM_{118}	—	October 7, 2005	Mount Lemmon	Mount Lemmon Survey	·	3.7 km	MPC · JPL
475061	2005 UN_{118}	—	September 30, 2005	Mount Lemmon	Mount Lemmon Survey	·	1.1 km	MPC · JPL
475062	2005 UE_{122}	—	September 30, 2005	Mount Lemmon	Mount Lemmon Survey	·	2.4 km	MPC · JPL
475063	2005 UV_{123}	—	October 1, 2005	Mount Lemmon	Mount Lemmon Survey	THM	2.0 km	MPC · JPL
475064	2005 UK_{126}	—	October 24, 2005	Kitt Peak	Spacewatch	NYS	850 m	MPC · JPL
475065	2005 UW_{126}	—	October 24, 2005	Kitt Peak	Spacewatch	·	1.0 km	MPC · JPL
475066	2005 UH_{128}	—	October 24, 2005	Kitt Peak	Spacewatch	NYS	940 m	MPC · JPL
475067	2005 UC_{129}	—	October 24, 2005	Kitt Peak	Spacewatch	·	2.4 km	MPC · JPL
475068	2005 UB_{133}	—	September 25, 2005	Kitt Peak	Spacewatch	·	2.7 km	MPC · JPL
475069	2005 UP_{133}	—	October 25, 2005	Mount Lemmon	Mount Lemmon Survey	EOS	2.0 km	MPC · JPL
475070	2005 UC_{136}	—	October 25, 2005	Mount Lemmon	Mount Lemmon Survey	MAS	580 m	MPC · JPL
475071	2005 UZ_{136}	—	October 25, 2005	Mount Lemmon	Mount Lemmon Survey	MAS	570 m	MPC · JPL
475072	2005 US_{139}	—	October 12, 2005	Kitt Peak	Spacewatch	·	2.1 km	MPC · JPL
475073	2005 UY_{139}	—	October 25, 2005	Mount Lemmon	Mount Lemmon Survey	·	2.8 km	MPC · JPL
475074	2005 UC_{143}	—	October 25, 2005	Mount Lemmon	Mount Lemmon Survey	·	2.6 km	MPC · JPL
475075	2005 UO_{147}	—	October 26, 2005	Kitt Peak	Spacewatch	·	1.1 km	MPC · JPL
475076	2005 UA_{152}	—	October 26, 2005	Kitt Peak	Spacewatch	·	2.7 km	MPC · JPL
475077	2005 UO_{155}	—	October 26, 2005	Palomar	NEAT	·	2.3 km	MPC · JPL
475078	2005 UZ_{156}	—	October 25, 2005	Mount Lemmon	Mount Lemmon Survey	fast	2.7 km	MPC · JPL
475079	2005 UL_{157}	—	October 28, 2005	Catalina	CSS	H	580 m	MPC · JPL
475080 Jarry	2005 UR_{157}	Jarry	October 26, 2005	Nogales	J.-C. Merlin	·	960 m	MPC · JPL
475081	2005 UP_{163}	—	October 24, 2005	Kitt Peak	Spacewatch	·	1.1 km	MPC · JPL
475082	2005 UC_{170}	—	October 24, 2005	Kitt Peak	Spacewatch	·	3.1 km	MPC · JPL
475083	2005 UY_{172}	—	October 24, 2005	Kitt Peak	Spacewatch	·	3.0 km	MPC · JPL
475084	2005 UU_{175}	—	October 24, 2005	Kitt Peak	Spacewatch	NYS	910 m	MPC · JPL
475085	2005 UM_{183}	—	October 25, 2005	Mount Lemmon	Mount Lemmon Survey	T_{j} (2.99)	3.1 km	MPC · JPL
475086	2005 UP_{183}	—	September 30, 2005	Mount Lemmon	Mount Lemmon Survey	·	2.3 km	MPC · JPL
475087	2005 UF_{187}	—	October 26, 2005	Kitt Peak	Spacewatch	V	550 m	MPC · JPL
475088	2005 UM_{187}	—	October 27, 2005	Mount Lemmon	Mount Lemmon Survey	·	2.7 km	MPC · JPL
475089	2005 UE_{188}	—	October 27, 2005	Mount Lemmon	Mount Lemmon Survey	·	3.0 km	MPC · JPL
475090	2005 UL_{188}	—	October 27, 2005	Mount Lemmon	Mount Lemmon Survey	·	920 m	MPC · JPL
475091	2005 UF_{194}	—	October 5, 2005	Kitt Peak	Spacewatch	V	520 m	MPC · JPL
475092	2005 UV_{194}	—	October 22, 2005	Kitt Peak	Spacewatch	·	3.3 km	MPC · JPL
475093	2005 UG_{197}	—	October 24, 2005	Kitt Peak	Spacewatch	THM	2.0 km	MPC · JPL
475094	2005 UC_{200}	—	October 25, 2005	Kitt Peak	Spacewatch	NYS	1.0 km	MPC · JPL
475095	2005 UZ_{202}	—	October 25, 2005	Kitt Peak	Spacewatch	·	1.0 km	MPC · JPL
475096	2005 UD_{203}	—	October 25, 2005	Kitt Peak	Spacewatch	·	3.3 km	MPC · JPL
475097	2005 UY_{217}	—	October 23, 2005	Kitt Peak	Spacewatch	H	370 m	MPC · JPL
475098	2005 UB_{219}	—	October 25, 2005	Kitt Peak	Spacewatch	V	540 m	MPC · JPL
475099	2005 UV_{219}	—	October 25, 2005	Kitt Peak	Spacewatch	·	2.9 km	MPC · JPL
475100	2005 UH_{222}	—	October 25, 2005	Kitt Peak	Spacewatch	NYS	960 m	MPC · JPL

== 475101–475200 ==
back to top

Designation			Discovery			Properties		Ref
Permanent	Provisional	Named after	Date	Site	Discoverer(s)	Category	Diam.	Ref
475101	2005 UR_{222}	—	October 25, 2005	Kitt Peak	Spacewatch	·	3.3 km	MPC · JPL
475102	2005 UQ_{231}	—	October 25, 2005	Mount Lemmon	Mount Lemmon Survey	MAS	680 m	MPC · JPL
475103	2005 UV_{231}	—	October 25, 2005	Mount Lemmon	Mount Lemmon Survey	NYS	1.1 km	MPC · JPL
475104	2005 UO_{233}	—	October 25, 2005	Kitt Peak	Spacewatch	·	3.2 km	MPC · JPL
475105	2005 UP_{234}	—	October 25, 2005	Kitt Peak	Spacewatch	·	1.0 km	MPC · JPL
475106	2005 UA_{237}	—	October 25, 2005	Kitt Peak	Spacewatch	·	990 m	MPC · JPL
475107	2005 UB_{237}	—	October 25, 2005	Kitt Peak	Spacewatch	·	2.6 km	MPC · JPL
475108	2005 UN_{245}	—	October 25, 2005	Kitt Peak	Spacewatch	·	2.5 km	MPC · JPL
475109	2005 UC_{252}	—	October 25, 2005	Catalina	CSS	·	3.1 km	MPC · JPL
475110	2005 US_{252}	—	October 26, 2005	Kitt Peak	Spacewatch	·	2.3 km	MPC · JPL
475111	2005 UC_{259}	—	October 25, 2005	Kitt Peak	Spacewatch	·	4.3 km	MPC · JPL
475112	2005 UO_{260}	—	October 25, 2005	Kitt Peak	Spacewatch	·	1.2 km	MPC · JPL
475113	2005 UM_{262}	—	October 26, 2005	Kitt Peak	Spacewatch	MAS	640 m	MPC · JPL
475114	2005 UF_{265}	—	October 27, 2005	Kitt Peak	Spacewatch	MAS	530 m	MPC · JPL
475115	2005 UQ_{269}	—	September 29, 2005	Mount Lemmon	Mount Lemmon Survey	·	2.6 km	MPC · JPL
475116	2005 UT_{270}	—	October 28, 2005	Mount Lemmon	Mount Lemmon Survey	·	2.3 km	MPC · JPL
475117	2005 UN_{274}	—	October 25, 2005	Catalina	CSS	·	3.5 km	MPC · JPL
475118	2005 UO_{275}	—	October 29, 2005	Catalina	CSS	·	3.4 km	MPC · JPL
475119	2005 UY_{279}	—	October 24, 2005	Kitt Peak	Spacewatch	·	3.2 km	MPC · JPL
475120	2005 UW_{280}	—	October 24, 2005	Kitt Peak	Spacewatch	·	2.5 km	MPC · JPL
475121	2005 UT_{284}	—	October 26, 2005	Kitt Peak	Spacewatch	·	3.1 km	MPC · JPL
475122	2005 UD_{287}	—	September 25, 2005	Kitt Peak	Spacewatch	·	2.6 km	MPC · JPL
475123	2005 UH_{289}	—	October 26, 2005	Kitt Peak	Spacewatch	VER	2.7 km	MPC · JPL
475124	2005 UN_{289}	—	October 26, 2005	Kitt Peak	Spacewatch	·	2.7 km	MPC · JPL
475125	2005 UG_{294}	—	October 26, 2005	Kitt Peak	Spacewatch	·	2.7 km	MPC · JPL
475126	2005 UJ_{299}	—	October 26, 2005	Kitt Peak	Spacewatch	THM	1.9 km	MPC · JPL
475127	2005 UO_{301}	—	October 26, 2005	Kitt Peak	Spacewatch	·	1.2 km	MPC · JPL
475128	2005 UU_{306}	—	October 27, 2005	Mount Lemmon	Mount Lemmon Survey	·	2.7 km	MPC · JPL
475129	2005 UN_{307}	—	October 27, 2005	Mount Lemmon	Mount Lemmon Survey	MAS	590 m	MPC · JPL
475130	2005 UR_{312}	—	October 29, 2005	Catalina	CSS	·	3.7 km	MPC · JPL
475131	2005 UO_{317}	—	October 7, 2005	Kitt Peak	Spacewatch	·	1.0 km	MPC · JPL
475132	2005 UT_{321}	—	October 27, 2005	Kitt Peak	Spacewatch	·	3.4 km	MPC · JPL
475133	2005 UB_{325}	—	October 1, 2005	Mount Lemmon	Mount Lemmon Survey	·	930 m	MPC · JPL
475134	2005 UH_{332}	—	October 29, 2005	Kitt Peak	Spacewatch	·	1.3 km	MPC · JPL
475135	2005 UJ_{335}	—	October 30, 2005	Kitt Peak	Spacewatch	·	1 km	MPC · JPL
475136	2005 UY_{337}	—	September 30, 2005	Mount Lemmon	Mount Lemmon Survey	·	2.2 km	MPC · JPL
475137	2005 UB_{342}	—	October 31, 2005	Mount Lemmon	Mount Lemmon Survey	ELF	4.2 km	MPC · JPL
475138	2005 UG_{342}	—	October 31, 2005	Mount Lemmon	Mount Lemmon Survey	V	490 m	MPC · JPL
475139	2005 UC_{345}	—	October 29, 2005	Mount Lemmon	Mount Lemmon Survey	·	2.9 km	MPC · JPL
475140	2005 UU_{347}	—	October 31, 2005	Kitt Peak	Spacewatch	·	3.2 km	MPC · JPL
475141	2005 UQ_{348}	—	October 23, 2005	Catalina	CSS	LIX	2.7 km	MPC · JPL
475142	2005 UD_{349}	—	October 25, 2005	Catalina	CSS	·	3.9 km	MPC · JPL
475143	2005 US_{350}	—	October 29, 2005	Catalina	CSS	LIX	4.0 km	MPC · JPL
475144	2005 UK_{354}	—	October 29, 2005	Catalina	CSS	·	1.2 km	MPC · JPL
475145	2005 UP_{354}	—	October 29, 2005	Catalina	CSS	T_{j} (2.98)	4.2 km	MPC · JPL
475146	2005 UZ_{358}	—	October 24, 2005	Kitt Peak	Spacewatch	EOS	1.4 km	MPC · JPL
475147	2005 UX_{362}	—	October 7, 2005	Kitt Peak	Spacewatch	·	970 m	MPC · JPL
475148	2005 UR_{364}	—	October 27, 2005	Kitt Peak	Spacewatch	·	990 m	MPC · JPL
475149	2005 UY_{366}	—	October 27, 2005	Kitt Peak	Spacewatch	NYS	880 m	MPC · JPL
475150	2005 UC_{370}	—	October 22, 2005	Kitt Peak	Spacewatch	·	2.9 km	MPC · JPL
475151	2005 UF_{374}	—	October 22, 2005	Kitt Peak	Spacewatch	·	2.7 km	MPC · JPL
475152	2005 UY_{375}	—	October 27, 2005	Kitt Peak	Spacewatch	·	3.8 km	MPC · JPL
475153	2005 UO_{379}	—	October 29, 2005	Mount Lemmon	Mount Lemmon Survey	MAS	690 m	MPC · JPL
475154	2005 UL_{380}	—	October 29, 2005	Mount Lemmon	Mount Lemmon Survey	·	3.0 km	MPC · JPL
475155	2005 UA_{381}	—	October 30, 2005	Mount Lemmon	Mount Lemmon Survey	·	3.1 km	MPC · JPL
475156	2005 UJ_{386}	—	October 1, 2005	Mount Lemmon	Mount Lemmon Survey	·	3.2 km	MPC · JPL
475157	2005 UO_{395}	—	October 11, 2005	Kitt Peak	Spacewatch	·	820 m	MPC · JPL
475158	2005 US_{395}	—	October 30, 2005	Catalina	CSS	·	4.0 km	MPC · JPL
475159	2005 UP_{396}	—	October 27, 2005	Anderson Mesa	LONEOS	·	2.9 km	MPC · JPL
475160	2005 UQ_{405}	—	October 29, 2005	Mount Lemmon	Mount Lemmon Survey	MAS	580 m	MPC · JPL
475161	2005 UH_{408}	—	October 6, 2005	Kitt Peak	Spacewatch	·	2.4 km	MPC · JPL
475162	2005 UF_{410}	—	October 31, 2005	Kitt Peak	Spacewatch	·	3.1 km	MPC · JPL
475163	2005 UZ_{411}	—	October 31, 2005	Mount Lemmon	Mount Lemmon Survey	·	2.4 km	MPC · JPL
475164	2005 UQ_{417}	—	October 25, 2005	Kitt Peak	Spacewatch	EOS	2.0 km	MPC · JPL
475165	2005 UK_{424}	—	October 12, 2005	Kitt Peak	Spacewatch	·	2.3 km	MPC · JPL
475166	2005 UT_{432}	—	October 28, 2005	Mount Lemmon	Mount Lemmon Survey	THM	2.1 km	MPC · JPL
475167	2005 UO_{433}	—	October 28, 2005	Kitt Peak	Spacewatch	·	860 m	MPC · JPL
475168	2005 UL_{434}	—	October 29, 2005	Mount Lemmon	Mount Lemmon Survey	·	2.6 km	MPC · JPL
475169	2005 UW_{440}	—	October 29, 2005	Catalina	CSS	·	1.1 km	MPC · JPL
475170	2005 UW_{444}	—	October 31, 2005	Kitt Peak	Spacewatch	·	2.6 km	MPC · JPL
475171	2005 UC_{445}	—	October 1, 2005	Catalina	CSS	·	1.1 km	MPC · JPL
475172	2005 UC_{450}	—	October 31, 2005	Socorro	LINEAR	(1298)	3.3 km	MPC · JPL
475173	2005 UL_{457}	—	October 25, 2005	Catalina	CSS	TIR	3.4 km	MPC · JPL
475174	2005 UX_{459}	—	September 30, 2005	Mount Lemmon	Mount Lemmon Survey	·	1.1 km	MPC · JPL
475175	2005 UJ_{460}	—	September 30, 2005	Mount Lemmon	Mount Lemmon Survey	·	2.5 km	MPC · JPL
475176	2005 UQ_{471}	—	October 30, 2005	Kitt Peak	Spacewatch	·	990 m	MPC · JPL
475177	2005 US_{471}	—	October 30, 2005	Kitt Peak	Spacewatch	HYG	2.7 km	MPC · JPL
475178	2005 UC_{472}	—	October 30, 2005	Kitt Peak	Spacewatch	·	1.3 km	MPC · JPL
475179	2005 UC_{473}	—	October 30, 2005	Mount Lemmon	Mount Lemmon Survey	NYS	950 m	MPC · JPL
475180	2005 UQ_{475}	—	October 22, 2005	Kitt Peak	Spacewatch	·	2.6 km	MPC · JPL
475181	2005 UE_{484}	—	October 22, 2005	Catalina	CSS	·	3.7 km	MPC · JPL
475182	2005 UE_{486}	—	October 23, 2005	Palomar	NEAT	H	480 m	MPC · JPL
475183	2005 UP_{486}	—	September 14, 2005	Socorro	LINEAR	·	2.7 km	MPC · JPL
475184	2005 UO_{500}	—	October 27, 2005	Socorro	LINEAR	·	2.7 km	MPC · JPL
475185	2005 UF_{503}	—	October 23, 2005	Catalina	CSS	·	3.2 km	MPC · JPL
475186	2005 UJ_{510}	—	October 25, 2005	Mount Lemmon	Mount Lemmon Survey	·	930 m	MPC · JPL
475187	2005 UM_{510}	—	October 25, 2005	Kitt Peak	Spacewatch	·	2.6 km	MPC · JPL
475188	2005 UO_{510}	—	October 25, 2005	Mount Lemmon	Mount Lemmon Survey	THM	1.9 km	MPC · JPL
475189	2005 UB_{512}	—	October 28, 2005	Mount Lemmon	Mount Lemmon Survey	·	3.0 km	MPC · JPL
475190	2005 UL_{514}	—	October 20, 2005	Apache Point	A. C. Becker	T_{j} (2.95)	2.4 km	MPC · JPL
475191	2005 UP_{516}	—	October 25, 2005	Apache Point	A. C. Becker	·	2.7 km	MPC · JPL
475192	2005 UK_{517}	—	October 25, 2005	Apache Point	A. C. Becker	·	2.7 km	MPC · JPL
475193	2005 UG_{518}	—	October 25, 2005	Apache Point	A. C. Becker	VER	2.2 km	MPC · JPL
475194	2005 UR_{518}	—	October 25, 2005	Apache Point	A. C. Becker	·	3.0 km	MPC · JPL
475195	2005 UC_{521}	—	October 26, 2005	Apache Point	A. C. Becker	·	1.4 km	MPC · JPL
475196	2005 US_{522}	—	October 27, 2005	Apache Point	A. C. Becker	·	2.0 km	MPC · JPL
475197	2005 UX_{530}	—	October 22, 2005	Catalina	CSS	·	990 m	MPC · JPL
475198	2005 VC_{1}	—	October 30, 2005	Catalina	CSS	·	1.4 km	MPC · JPL
475199	2005 VQ_{2}	—	November 5, 2005	Pla D'Arguines	D'Arguines, Pla	T_{j} (2.99)	3.5 km	MPC · JPL
475200	2005 VR_{3}	—	November 1, 2005	Anderson Mesa	LONEOS	H	460 m	MPC · JPL

== 475201–475300 ==
back to top

Designation			Discovery			Properties		Ref
Permanent	Provisional	Named after	Date	Site	Discoverer(s)	Category	Diam.	Ref
475201	2005 VR_{5}	—	November 10, 2005	Gnosca	S. Sposetti	·	2.5 km	MPC · JPL
475202	2005 VU_{10}	—	October 22, 2005	Kitt Peak	Spacewatch	fast	860 m	MPC · JPL
475203	2005 VA_{11}	—	November 2, 2005	Mount Lemmon	Mount Lemmon Survey	·	870 m	MPC · JPL
475204	2005 VU_{15}	—	October 23, 2005	Catalina	CSS	TIR	3.1 km	MPC · JPL
475205	2005 VQ_{16}	—	September 29, 2005	Catalina	CSS	·	1.5 km	MPC · JPL
475206	2005 VD_{18}	—	October 1, 2005	Mount Lemmon	Mount Lemmon Survey	·	2.7 km	MPC · JPL
475207	2005 VS_{20}	—	November 1, 2005	Kitt Peak	Spacewatch	·	2.6 km	MPC · JPL
475208	2005 VK_{25}	—	November 2, 2005	Socorro	LINEAR	·	4.1 km	MPC · JPL
475209	2005 VV_{25}	—	November 2, 2005	Mount Lemmon	Mount Lemmon Survey	·	980 m	MPC · JPL
475210	2005 VM_{34}	—	September 25, 2005	Kitt Peak	Spacewatch	·	2.8 km	MPC · JPL
475211	2005 VV_{34}	—	November 3, 2005	Mount Lemmon	Mount Lemmon Survey	·	1.0 km	MPC · JPL
475212	2005 VA_{37}	—	November 3, 2005	Mount Lemmon	Mount Lemmon Survey	·	2.5 km	MPC · JPL
475213	2005 VS_{37}	—	November 3, 2005	Catalina	CSS	·	1.2 km	MPC · JPL
475214	2005 VW_{37}	—	November 3, 2005	Mount Lemmon	Mount Lemmon Survey	·	2.9 km	MPC · JPL
475215	2005 VX_{46}	—	September 30, 2005	Mount Lemmon	Mount Lemmon Survey	·	1.2 km	MPC · JPL
475216	2005 VJ_{62}	—	November 1, 2005	Mount Lemmon	Mount Lemmon Survey	EOS	1.5 km	MPC · JPL
475217	2005 VC_{71}	—	November 1, 2005	Mount Lemmon	Mount Lemmon Survey	MAS	550 m	MPC · JPL
475218	2005 VP_{72}	—	November 2, 2005	Mount Lemmon	Mount Lemmon Survey	·	2.8 km	MPC · JPL
475219	2005 VD_{79}	—	November 3, 2005	Mount Lemmon	Mount Lemmon Survey	VER	2.1 km	MPC · JPL
475220	2005 VG_{87}	—	November 6, 2005	Kitt Peak	Spacewatch	·	840 m	MPC · JPL
475221	2005 VN_{89}	—	October 25, 2005	Kitt Peak	Spacewatch	·	2.8 km	MPC · JPL
475222	2005 VC_{90}	—	October 30, 2005	Mount Lemmon	Mount Lemmon Survey	·	3.4 km	MPC · JPL
475223	2005 VU_{96}	—	October 26, 2005	Kitt Peak	Spacewatch	LIX	2.6 km	MPC · JPL
475224	2005 VC_{98}	—	November 7, 2005	Socorro	LINEAR	fast	3.8 km	MPC · JPL
475225	2005 VL_{101}	—	October 25, 2005	Kitt Peak	Spacewatch	·	3.8 km	MPC · JPL
475226	2005 VX_{109}	—	November 6, 2005	Mount Lemmon	Mount Lemmon Survey	NYS	940 m	MPC · JPL
475227	2005 VU_{110}	—	November 6, 2005	Mount Lemmon	Mount Lemmon Survey	·	910 m	MPC · JPL
475228	2005 VJ_{112}	—	November 7, 2005	Socorro	LINEAR	EOS	2.1 km	MPC · JPL
475229	2005 VL_{114}	—	October 27, 2005	Mount Lemmon	Mount Lemmon Survey	·	820 m	MPC · JPL
475230	2005 VD_{125}	—	November 11, 2005	Socorro	LINEAR	·	4.2 km	MPC · JPL
475231	2005 VJ_{129}	—	September 23, 2005	Kitt Peak	Spacewatch	·	1.2 km	MPC · JPL
475232	2005 VK_{130}	—	November 1, 2005	Apache Point	A. C. Becker	·	2.6 km	MPC · JPL
475233	2005 VW_{132}	—	November 1, 2005	Apache Point	A. C. Becker	·	2.5 km	MPC · JPL
475234	2005 WH	—	November 19, 2005	Mayhill	Lowe, A.	·	4.2 km	MPC · JPL
475235	2005 WF_{2}	—	November 10, 2005	Catalina	CSS	·	3.3 km	MPC · JPL
475236	2005 WV_{3}	—	November 23, 2005	Socorro	LINEAR	·	4.9 km	MPC · JPL
475237	2005 WL_{10}	—	November 22, 2005	Kitt Peak	Spacewatch	·	2.6 km	MPC · JPL
475238	2005 WO_{12}	—	November 22, 2005	Kitt Peak	Spacewatch	·	4.6 km	MPC · JPL
475239	2005 WD_{16}	—	November 22, 2005	Kitt Peak	Spacewatch	MAS	560 m	MPC · JPL
475240	2005 WK_{17}	—	November 22, 2005	Kitt Peak	Spacewatch	ERI	1.2 km	MPC · JPL
475241	2005 WU_{20}	—	November 12, 2005	Kitt Peak	Spacewatch	·	1.1 km	MPC · JPL
475242	2005 WB_{21}	—	November 21, 2005	Kitt Peak	Spacewatch	·	1.9 km	MPC · JPL
475243	2005 WP_{24}	—	November 21, 2005	Kitt Peak	Spacewatch	V	680 m	MPC · JPL
475244	2005 WU_{28}	—	November 21, 2005	Kitt Peak	Spacewatch	·	1.0 km	MPC · JPL
475245	2005 WL_{30}	—	November 21, 2005	Kitt Peak	Spacewatch	LIX	3.3 km	MPC · JPL
475246	2005 WL_{31}	—	November 21, 2005	Kitt Peak	Spacewatch	·	820 m	MPC · JPL
475247	2005 WX_{32}	—	November 21, 2005	Kitt Peak	Spacewatch	·	950 m	MPC · JPL
475248	2005 WH_{33}	—	November 21, 2005	Kitt Peak	Spacewatch	·	3.6 km	MPC · JPL
475249	2005 WM_{37}	—	November 22, 2005	Kitt Peak	Spacewatch	·	1.1 km	MPC · JPL
475250	2005 WP_{40}	—	November 25, 2005	Mount Lemmon	Mount Lemmon Survey	V	740 m	MPC · JPL
475251	2005 WZ_{45}	—	November 22, 2005	Kitt Peak	Spacewatch	·	1.4 km	MPC · JPL
475252	2005 WQ_{46}	—	November 1, 2005	Kitt Peak	Spacewatch	·	3.1 km	MPC · JPL
475253	2005 WN_{48}	—	November 25, 2005	Kitt Peak	Spacewatch	·	2.7 km	MPC · JPL
475254	2005 WP_{62}	—	November 25, 2005	Catalina	CSS	·	3.2 km	MPC · JPL
475255	2005 WM_{64}	—	November 25, 2005	Mount Lemmon	Mount Lemmon Survey	·	1.4 km	MPC · JPL
475256	2005 WV_{66}	—	November 22, 2005	Kitt Peak	Spacewatch	·	1.0 km	MPC · JPL
475257	2005 WC_{67}	—	October 27, 2005	Mount Lemmon	Mount Lemmon Survey	·	3.2 km	MPC · JPL
475258	2005 WM_{68}	—	November 25, 2005	Mount Lemmon	Mount Lemmon Survey	·	2.4 km	MPC · JPL
475259	2005 WM_{76}	—	November 25, 2005	Kitt Peak	Spacewatch	·	3.6 km	MPC · JPL
475260	2005 WS_{78}	—	November 25, 2005	Kitt Peak	Spacewatch	·	3.2 km	MPC · JPL
475261	2005 WQ_{85}	—	November 28, 2005	Mount Lemmon	Mount Lemmon Survey	·	3.6 km	MPC · JPL
475262	2005 WR_{90}	—	October 23, 2005	Catalina	CSS	·	3.8 km	MPC · JPL
475263	2005 WE_{91}	—	November 21, 2005	Catalina	CSS	·	1.2 km	MPC · JPL
475264	2005 WY_{92}	—	November 25, 2005	Mount Lemmon	Mount Lemmon Survey	·	2.6 km	MPC · JPL
475265	2005 WG_{101}	—	November 12, 2005	Catalina	CSS	T_{j} (2.98)	3.1 km	MPC · JPL
475266	2005 WC_{103}	—	November 26, 2005	Catalina	CSS	H	650 m	MPC · JPL
475267	2005 WO_{103}	—	November 26, 2005	Catalina	CSS	·	5.4 km	MPC · JPL
475268	2005 WN_{121}	—	November 30, 2005	Mount Lemmon	Mount Lemmon Survey	·	930 m	MPC · JPL
475269	2005 WF_{124}	—	November 25, 2005	Mount Lemmon	Mount Lemmon Survey	MAS	720 m	MPC · JPL
475270	2005 WX_{124}	—	November 25, 2005	Kitt Peak	Spacewatch	THM	1.8 km	MPC · JPL
475271	2005 WB_{125}	—	November 25, 2005	Mount Lemmon	Mount Lemmon Survey	·	2.5 km	MPC · JPL
475272	2005 WK_{125}	—	November 25, 2005	Mount Lemmon	Mount Lemmon Survey	·	4.2 km	MPC · JPL
475273	2005 WR_{126}	—	October 25, 2005	Mount Lemmon	Mount Lemmon Survey	·	1.1 km	MPC · JPL
475274	2005 WF_{127}	—	October 27, 2005	Mount Lemmon	Mount Lemmon Survey	·	2.6 km	MPC · JPL
475275	2005 WJ_{127}	—	October 27, 2005	Mount Lemmon	Mount Lemmon Survey	·	3.0 km	MPC · JPL
475276	2005 WR_{139}	—	November 26, 2005	Mount Lemmon	Mount Lemmon Survey	HYG	2.1 km	MPC · JPL
475277	2005 WP_{142}	—	November 29, 2005	Mount Lemmon	Mount Lemmon Survey	THM	2.7 km	MPC · JPL
475278	2005 WS_{144}	—	November 25, 2005	Kitt Peak	Spacewatch	·	1.1 km	MPC · JPL
475279	2005 WF_{148}	—	November 26, 2005	Catalina	CSS	·	3.3 km	MPC · JPL
475280	2005 WJ_{149}	—	November 28, 2005	Kitt Peak	Spacewatch	·	1.0 km	MPC · JPL
475281	2005 WK_{150}	—	October 29, 2005	Kitt Peak	Spacewatch	·	3.3 km	MPC · JPL
475282	2005 WO_{151}	—	November 28, 2005	Catalina	CSS	·	4.2 km	MPC · JPL
475283	2005 WW_{152}	—	November 21, 2005	Kitt Peak	Spacewatch	·	1.1 km	MPC · JPL
475284	2005 WM_{153}	—	November 29, 2005	Kitt Peak	Spacewatch	·	3.7 km	MPC · JPL
475285	2005 WU_{163}	—	November 29, 2005	Kitt Peak	Spacewatch	V	620 m	MPC · JPL
475286	2005 WV_{164}	—	November 29, 2005	Kitt Peak	Spacewatch	·	5.4 km	MPC · JPL
475287	2005 WH_{172}	—	November 4, 2005	Kitt Peak	Spacewatch	·	840 m	MPC · JPL
475288	2005 WO_{205}	—	November 30, 2005	Mount Lemmon	Mount Lemmon Survey	·	1.4 km	MPC · JPL
475289	2005 XB_{2}	—	December 1, 2005	Socorro	LINEAR	·	940 m	MPC · JPL
475290	2005 XV_{3}	—	November 1, 2005	Mount Lemmon	Mount Lemmon Survey	LIX	4.2 km	MPC · JPL
475291	2005 XE_{19}	—	December 2, 2005	Kitt Peak	Spacewatch	·	1.2 km	MPC · JPL
475292	2005 XH_{29}	—	December 4, 2005	Catalina	CSS	TIR	3.1 km	MPC · JPL
475293	2005 XQ_{30}	—	December 1, 2005	Kitt Peak	Spacewatch	·	2.6 km	MPC · JPL
475294	2005 XJ_{32}	—	December 4, 2005	Kitt Peak	Spacewatch	NYS	850 m	MPC · JPL
475295	2005 XS_{32}	—	November 30, 2005	Kitt Peak	Spacewatch	·	3.7 km	MPC · JPL
475296	2005 XT_{33}	—	November 26, 2005	Kitt Peak	Spacewatch	·	3.1 km	MPC · JPL
475297	2005 XS_{48}	—	December 2, 2005	Socorro	LINEAR	·	1.4 km	MPC · JPL
475298	2005 XM_{50}	—	December 2, 2005	Kitt Peak	Spacewatch	·	1.1 km	MPC · JPL
475299	2005 XQ_{54}	—	December 5, 2005	Kitt Peak	Spacewatch	·	910 m	MPC · JPL
475300	2005 XN_{62}	—	December 5, 2005	Mount Lemmon	Mount Lemmon Survey	MAS	560 m	MPC · JPL

== 475301–475400 ==
back to top

Designation			Discovery			Properties		Ref
Permanent	Provisional	Named after	Date	Site	Discoverer(s)	Category	Diam.	Ref
475301	2005 XF_{68}	—	December 6, 2005	Kitt Peak	Spacewatch	·	2.4 km	MPC · JPL
475302	2005 XZ_{69}	—	December 6, 2005	Kitt Peak	Spacewatch	NYS	1.1 km	MPC · JPL
475303	2005 XB_{72}	—	December 6, 2005	Kitt Peak	Spacewatch	MAR	940 m	MPC · JPL
475304	2005 XB_{78}	—	December 10, 2005	Calvin-Rehoboth	Calvin College	·	3.2 km	MPC · JPL
475305	2005 XZ_{79}	—	December 8, 2005	Catalina	CSS	·	1.1 km	MPC · JPL
475306	2005 YR_{1}	—	December 21, 2005	Catalina	CSS	·	2.9 km	MPC · JPL
475307	2005 YP_{13}	—	December 10, 2005	Kitt Peak	Spacewatch	·	1.0 km	MPC · JPL
475308	2005 YR_{15}	—	December 22, 2005	Kitt Peak	Spacewatch	·	1 km	MPC · JPL
475309	2005 YB_{23}	—	December 24, 2005	Kitt Peak	Spacewatch	MAS	570 m	MPC · JPL
475310	2005 YU_{29}	—	December 25, 2005	Kitt Peak	Spacewatch	·	1.1 km	MPC · JPL
475311	2005 YA_{31}	—	December 22, 2005	Kitt Peak	Spacewatch	·	930 m	MPC · JPL
475312	2005 YU_{45}	—	December 25, 2005	Kitt Peak	Spacewatch	MAS	600 m	MPC · JPL
475313	2005 YC_{57}	—	December 5, 2005	Kitt Peak	Spacewatch	·	920 m	MPC · JPL
475314	2005 YD_{82}	—	December 24, 2005	Kitt Peak	Spacewatch	·	1.0 km	MPC · JPL
475315	2005 YW_{100}	—	December 24, 2005	Kitt Peak	Spacewatch	NYS	860 m	MPC · JPL
475316	2005 YL_{107}	—	December 25, 2005	Mount Lemmon	Mount Lemmon Survey	THB	2.6 km	MPC · JPL
475317	2005 YX_{113}	—	December 25, 2005	Kitt Peak	Spacewatch	·	1.2 km	MPC · JPL
475318	2005 YZ_{126}	—	December 27, 2005	Catalina	CSS	·	1.0 km	MPC · JPL
475319	2005 YS_{148}	—	December 25, 2005	Kitt Peak	Spacewatch	·	3.6 km	MPC · JPL
475320	2005 YE_{162}	—	December 27, 2005	Kitt Peak	Spacewatch	·	1.4 km	MPC · JPL
475321	2005 YU_{167}	—	December 27, 2005	Kitt Peak	Spacewatch	NYS	1.1 km	MPC · JPL
475322	2005 YE_{187}	—	December 28, 2005	Kitt Peak	Spacewatch	·	1.0 km	MPC · JPL
475323	2005 YK_{199}	—	December 25, 2005	Kitt Peak	Spacewatch	·	2.0 km	MPC · JPL
475324	2005 YO_{199}	—	December 25, 2005	Mount Lemmon	Mount Lemmon Survey	·	1.3 km	MPC · JPL
475325	2005 YJ_{207}	—	December 28, 2005	Mount Lemmon	Mount Lemmon Survey	·	1.4 km	MPC · JPL
475326	2005 YL_{224}	—	December 4, 2005	Mount Lemmon	Mount Lemmon Survey	·	1.2 km	MPC · JPL
475327	2005 YN_{228}	—	December 25, 2005	Mount Lemmon	Mount Lemmon Survey	MAS	540 m	MPC · JPL
475328	2005 YC_{235}	—	December 28, 2005	Mount Lemmon	Mount Lemmon Survey	·	1 km	MPC · JPL
475329	2005 YV_{271}	—	December 28, 2005	Mount Lemmon	Mount Lemmon Survey	·	1.9 km	MPC · JPL
475330	2005 YX_{276}	—	December 24, 2005	Kitt Peak	Spacewatch	·	1.2 km	MPC · JPL
475331	2006 AY_{18}	—	January 5, 2006	Kitt Peak	Spacewatch	·	1.5 km	MPC · JPL
475332	2006 AK_{27}	—	January 5, 2006	Mount Lemmon	Mount Lemmon Survey	MAS	690 m	MPC · JPL
475333	2006 AR_{28}	—	December 25, 2005	Kitt Peak	Spacewatch	·	1.0 km	MPC · JPL
475334	2006 AW_{34}	—	January 4, 2006	Kitt Peak	Spacewatch	·	800 m	MPC · JPL
475335	2006 AQ_{42}	—	January 6, 2006	Kitt Peak	Spacewatch	CYB	4.1 km	MPC · JPL
475336	2006 AN_{82}	—	January 5, 2006	Mount Lemmon	Mount Lemmon Survey	·	1.4 km	MPC · JPL
475337	2006 AT_{104}	—	January 7, 2006	Mount Lemmon	Mount Lemmon Survey	·	880 m	MPC · JPL
475338	2006 AV_{104}	—	January 7, 2006	Mount Lemmon	Mount Lemmon Survey	·	1.5 km	MPC · JPL
475339	2006 BF_{1}	—	January 7, 2006	Mount Lemmon	Mount Lemmon Survey	V	550 m	MPC · JPL
475340	2006 BR_{28}	—	January 5, 2006	Mount Lemmon	Mount Lemmon Survey	NYS	850 m	MPC · JPL
475341	2006 BF_{48}	—	January 7, 2006	Kitt Peak	Spacewatch	·	1.0 km	MPC · JPL
475342	2006 BP_{66}	—	January 23, 2006	Kitt Peak	Spacewatch	·	840 m	MPC · JPL
475343	2006 BX_{69}	—	January 23, 2006	Kitt Peak	Spacewatch	·	1.2 km	MPC · JPL
475344	2006 BO_{98}	—	January 28, 2006	7300	W. K. Y. Yeung	·	1.5 km	MPC · JPL
475345	2006 BJ_{107}	—	January 25, 2006	Kitt Peak	Spacewatch	·	1.2 km	MPC · JPL
475346	2006 BM_{110}	—	January 25, 2006	Kitt Peak	Spacewatch	MAS	780 m	MPC · JPL
475347	2006 BG_{111}	—	January 25, 2006	Kitt Peak	Spacewatch	·	1.3 km	MPC · JPL
475348	2006 BK_{140}	—	December 2, 2005	Mount Lemmon	Mount Lemmon Survey	MAS	700 m	MPC · JPL
475349	2006 BR_{146}	—	January 23, 2006	Kitt Peak	Spacewatch	·	800 m	MPC · JPL
475350	2006 BB_{161}	—	January 26, 2006	Kitt Peak	Spacewatch	·	1.1 km	MPC · JPL
475351	2006 BP_{164}	—	January 26, 2006	Kitt Peak	Spacewatch	·	1.6 km	MPC · JPL
475352	2006 BF_{193}	—	January 30, 2006	Kitt Peak	Spacewatch	·	950 m	MPC · JPL
475353	2006 BX_{234}	—	January 23, 2006	Mount Lemmon	Mount Lemmon Survey	·	930 m	MPC · JPL
475354	2006 CE	—	February 1, 2006	Catalina	CSS	AMO	740 m	MPC · JPL
475355	2006 CP_{2}	—	February 1, 2006	Mount Lemmon	Mount Lemmon Survey	·	1.0 km	MPC · JPL
475356	2006 CQ_{5}	—	January 9, 2006	Kitt Peak	Spacewatch	MAR	1.0 km	MPC · JPL
475357	2006 CB_{12}	—	February 1, 2006	Kitt Peak	Spacewatch	·	1.1 km	MPC · JPL
475358	2006 CY_{15}	—	February 1, 2006	Kitt Peak	Spacewatch	·	1.0 km	MPC · JPL
475359	2006 CC_{26}	—	February 2, 2006	Kitt Peak	Spacewatch	·	1.2 km	MPC · JPL
475360	2006 CH_{48}	—	January 23, 2006	Mount Lemmon	Mount Lemmon Survey	·	920 m	MPC · JPL
475361	2006 CX_{67}	—	February 1, 2006	Kitt Peak	Spacewatch	·	1.3 km	MPC · JPL
475362	2006 CE_{68}	—	February 2, 2006	Mount Lemmon	Mount Lemmon Survey	·	1.2 km	MPC · JPL
475363	2006 DE_{32}	—	February 20, 2006	Mount Lemmon	Mount Lemmon Survey	·	1.7 km	MPC · JPL
475364	2006 DD_{37}	—	February 20, 2006	Mount Lemmon	Mount Lemmon Survey	·	1.5 km	MPC · JPL
475365	2006 DC_{43}	—	February 20, 2006	Kitt Peak	Spacewatch	·	1.0 km	MPC · JPL
475366	2006 DU_{45}	—	February 20, 2006	Kitt Peak	Spacewatch	·	1.4 km	MPC · JPL
475367	2006 DA_{114}	—	February 27, 2006	Kitt Peak	Spacewatch	·	1.2 km	MPC · JPL
475368	2006 DG_{116}	—	February 27, 2006	Kitt Peak	Spacewatch	·	2.1 km	MPC · JPL
475369	2006 DC_{128}	—	January 25, 2006	Kitt Peak	Spacewatch	MAR	850 m	MPC · JPL
475370	2006 DV_{132}	—	February 25, 2006	Kitt Peak	Spacewatch	·	1.6 km	MPC · JPL
475371	2006 DQ_{134}	—	February 25, 2006	Kitt Peak	Spacewatch	·	1.2 km	MPC · JPL
475372	2006 DN_{154}	—	February 25, 2006	Kitt Peak	Spacewatch	·	1.4 km	MPC · JPL
475373	2006 DV_{165}	—	February 27, 2006	Kitt Peak	Spacewatch	·	1.0 km	MPC · JPL
475374	2006 DP_{216}	—	February 21, 2006	Mount Lemmon	Mount Lemmon Survey	·	1.1 km	MPC · JPL
475375	2006 EY_{1}	—	March 3, 2006	Mount Nyukasa	Japan Aerospace Exploration Agency	(5)	1.3 km	MPC · JPL
475376	2006 ET_{16}	—	March 2, 2006	Mount Lemmon	Mount Lemmon Survey	·	1.5 km	MPC · JPL
475377	2006 EO_{34}	—	March 3, 2006	Kitt Peak	Spacewatch	·	1.3 km	MPC · JPL
475378	2006 ES_{73}	—	March 9, 2006	Kitt Peak	Spacewatch	RAF	870 m	MPC · JPL
475379	2006 FX_{13}	—	March 23, 2006	Kitt Peak	Spacewatch	·	1.5 km	MPC · JPL
475380	2006 FF_{25}	—	March 24, 2006	Kitt Peak	Spacewatch	·	1.3 km	MPC · JPL
475381	2006 FV_{54}	—	March 25, 2006	Kitt Peak	Spacewatch	MAR	1.1 km	MPC · JPL
475382	2006 GZ_{3}	—	April 5, 2002	Kitt Peak	Spacewatch	·	1.1 km	MPC · JPL
475383	2006 GP_{5}	—	April 2, 2006	Kitt Peak	Spacewatch	·	2.3 km	MPC · JPL
475384	2006 GN_{19}	—	April 2, 2006	Kitt Peak	Spacewatch	3:2	4.8 km	MPC · JPL
475385	2006 GH_{20}	—	March 23, 2006	Kitt Peak	Spacewatch	AEO	1.1 km	MPC · JPL
475386	2006 GT_{21}	—	February 27, 2006	Kitt Peak	Spacewatch	·	1.6 km	MPC · JPL
475387	2006 GA_{28}	—	April 2, 2006	Kitt Peak	Spacewatch	·	2.1 km	MPC · JPL
475388	2006 GK_{38}	—	April 2, 2006	Catalina	CSS	·	2.0 km	MPC · JPL
475389	2006 GR_{51}	—	April 7, 2006	Anderson Mesa	LONEOS	·	1.5 km	MPC · JPL
475390	2006 HN_{7}	—	April 19, 2006	Palomar	NEAT	·	510 m	MPC · JPL
475391	2006 HW_{30}	—	April 2, 2006	Catalina	CSS	·	680 m	MPC · JPL
475392	2006 HY_{32}	—	April 19, 2006	Kitt Peak	Spacewatch	·	1.4 km	MPC · JPL
475393	2006 HW_{35}	—	April 20, 2006	Kitt Peak	Spacewatch	·	1.3 km	MPC · JPL
475394	2006 HJ_{43}	—	April 24, 2006	Mount Lemmon	Mount Lemmon Survey	·	2.1 km	MPC · JPL
475395	2006 HN_{49}	—	April 8, 2006	Kitt Peak	Spacewatch	·	1.7 km	MPC · JPL
475396	2006 HE_{58}	—	April 19, 2006	Catalina	CSS	(194)	2.3 km	MPC · JPL
475397	2006 HK_{74}	—	April 25, 2006	Kitt Peak	Spacewatch	·	1.3 km	MPC · JPL
475398	2006 HU_{88}	—	April 30, 2006	Kitt Peak	Spacewatch	·	1.6 km	MPC · JPL
475399	2006 HK_{106}	—	April 30, 2006	Kitt Peak	Spacewatch	EUN	1.2 km	MPC · JPL
475400	2006 HH_{117}	—	April 9, 2006	Kitt Peak	Spacewatch	·	1.7 km	MPC · JPL

== 475401–475500 ==
back to top

Designation			Discovery			Properties		Ref
Permanent	Provisional	Named after	Date	Site	Discoverer(s)	Category	Diam.	Ref
475401	2006 HH_{152}	—	April 21, 2006	Kitt Peak	Spacewatch	·	1.6 km	MPC · JPL
475402	2006 JN_{2}	—	May 1, 2006	Kitt Peak	Spacewatch	·	1.7 km	MPC · JPL
475403	2006 JO_{4}	—	April 19, 2006	Kitt Peak	Spacewatch	·	1.6 km	MPC · JPL
475404	2006 JV_{4}	—	May 2, 2006	Mount Lemmon	Mount Lemmon Survey	·	1.3 km	MPC · JPL
475405	2006 JU_{6}	—	April 8, 2006	Kitt Peak	Spacewatch	·	1.5 km	MPC · JPL
475406	2006 JP_{16}	—	April 24, 2006	Kitt Peak	Spacewatch	·	1.5 km	MPC · JPL
475407	2006 JX_{21}	—	May 2, 2006	Kitt Peak	Spacewatch	·	1.6 km	MPC · JPL
475408	2006 JG_{29}	—	April 21, 2006	Kitt Peak	Spacewatch	(18466)	1.9 km	MPC · JPL
475409	2006 JQ_{31}	—	May 3, 2006	Kitt Peak	Spacewatch	·	1.7 km	MPC · JPL
475410	2006 JS_{56}	—	April 21, 2006	Catalina	CSS	MAR	1.3 km	MPC · JPL
475411	2006 KA_{12}	—	May 20, 2006	Kitt Peak	Spacewatch	·	1.7 km	MPC · JPL
475412	2006 KZ_{12}	—	May 20, 2006	Kitt Peak	Spacewatch	·	1.8 km	MPC · JPL
475413	2006 KY_{13}	—	May 20, 2006	Kitt Peak	Spacewatch	·	1.8 km	MPC · JPL
475414	2006 KZ_{15}	—	May 20, 2006	Palomar	NEAT	·	1.8 km	MPC · JPL
475415	2006 KP_{18}	—	May 21, 2006	Kitt Peak	Spacewatch	·	2.1 km	MPC · JPL
475416	2006 KE_{22}	—	May 19, 2006	Mount Lemmon	Mount Lemmon Survey	·	1.6 km	MPC · JPL
475417	2006 KZ_{23}	—	May 6, 2006	Mount Lemmon	Mount Lemmon Survey	·	1.8 km	MPC · JPL
475418	2006 KM_{35}	—	May 20, 2006	Kitt Peak	Spacewatch	·	1.7 km	MPC · JPL
475419	2006 KK_{52}	—	October 2, 2003	Kitt Peak	Spacewatch	·	1.8 km	MPC · JPL
475420	2006 KK_{66}	—	May 7, 2006	Kitt Peak	Spacewatch	·	1.7 km	MPC · JPL
475421	2006 KN_{80}	—	May 25, 2006	Mount Lemmon	Mount Lemmon Survey	·	1.4 km	MPC · JPL
475422	2006 KP_{95}	—	May 25, 2006	Mount Lemmon	Mount Lemmon Survey	·	970 m	MPC · JPL
475423	2006 KH_{100}	—	May 28, 2006	Reedy Creek	J. Broughton	·	1.6 km	MPC · JPL
475424	2006 KX_{122}	—	May 25, 2006	Mount Lemmon	Mount Lemmon Survey	·	1.8 km	MPC · JPL
475425	2006 MR_{1}	—	June 18, 2006	Kitt Peak	Spacewatch	·	2.0 km	MPC · JPL
475426	2006 PH	—	August 2, 2006	Pla D'Arguines	R. Ferrando	GEF	1.6 km	MPC · JPL
475427	2006 PV_{10}	—	August 13, 2006	Palomar	NEAT	·	580 m	MPC · JPL
475428	2006 PJ_{20}	—	June 22, 2006	Siding Spring	SSS	·	2.3 km	MPC · JPL
475429	2006 QZ_{4}	—	August 19, 2006	Kitt Peak	Spacewatch	KOR	1.4 km	MPC · JPL
475430	2006 QW_{11}	—	August 16, 2006	Siding Spring	SSS	·	670 m	MPC · JPL
475431	2006 QG_{17}	—	August 17, 2006	Palomar	NEAT	·	620 m	MPC · JPL
475432	2006 QA_{87}	—	August 19, 2006	Kitt Peak	Spacewatch	·	540 m	MPC · JPL
475433	2006 QW_{98}	—	July 25, 2006	Mount Lemmon	Mount Lemmon Survey	·	570 m	MPC · JPL
475434	2006 QR_{121}	—	September 16, 2001	Socorro	LINEAR	·	2.2 km	MPC · JPL
475435	2006 QR_{130}	—	July 30, 2006	Siding Spring	SSS	·	2.1 km	MPC · JPL
475436	2006 QZ_{147}	—	August 18, 2006	Kitt Peak	Spacewatch	·	2.0 km	MPC · JPL
475437	2006 QS_{170}	—	August 21, 2006	Kitt Peak	Spacewatch	BRA	1.6 km	MPC · JPL
475438	2006 QD_{173}	—	August 22, 2006	Cerro Tololo	M. W. Buie	·	1.7 km	MPC · JPL
475439	2006 QG_{183}	—	August 21, 2006	Kitt Peak	Spacewatch	·	1.4 km	MPC · JPL
475440	2006 QC_{185}	—	August 27, 2006	Kitt Peak	Spacewatch	KOR	1.4 km	MPC · JPL
475441	2006 RP_{15}	—	August 21, 2006	Kitt Peak	Spacewatch	·	670 m	MPC · JPL
475442	2006 RQ_{21}	—	August 27, 2006	Kitt Peak	Spacewatch	KOR	1.4 km	MPC · JPL
475443	2006 RG_{24}	—	September 14, 2006	Kitt Peak	Spacewatch	fast	550 m	MPC · JPL
475444	2006 RM_{35}	—	September 14, 2006	Catalina	CSS	TRE	3.2 km	MPC · JPL
475445	2006 RD_{51}	—	September 14, 2006	Kitt Peak	Spacewatch	·	650 m	MPC · JPL
475446	2006 RM_{52}	—	September 14, 2006	Kitt Peak	Spacewatch	·	580 m	MPC · JPL
475447	2006 RJ_{54}	—	September 14, 2006	Kitt Peak	Spacewatch	H	440 m	MPC · JPL
475448	2006 RG_{55}	—	September 14, 2006	Kitt Peak	Spacewatch	EOS	1.7 km	MPC · JPL
475449	2006 RB_{56}	—	September 14, 2006	Kitt Peak	Spacewatch	·	1.3 km	MPC · JPL
475450	2006 RF_{59}	—	September 15, 2006	Kitt Peak	Spacewatch	·	660 m	MPC · JPL
475451	2006 RL_{65}	—	September 14, 2006	Catalina	CSS	·	690 m	MPC · JPL
475452	2006 RR_{66}	—	September 14, 2006	Kitt Peak	Spacewatch	·	2.1 km	MPC · JPL
475453	2006 RL_{68}	—	September 15, 2006	Kitt Peak	Spacewatch	·	1.8 km	MPC · JPL
475454	2006 RD_{74}	—	September 15, 2006	Kitt Peak	Spacewatch	·	1.3 km	MPC · JPL
475455	2006 RB_{76}	—	September 15, 2006	Kitt Peak	Spacewatch	·	1.8 km	MPC · JPL
475456	2006 RT_{78}	—	September 15, 2006	Kitt Peak	Spacewatch	·	1.7 km	MPC · JPL
475457	2006 RQ_{79}	—	September 15, 2006	Kitt Peak	Spacewatch	·	1.5 km	MPC · JPL
475458	2006 RT_{85}	—	September 15, 2006	Kitt Peak	Spacewatch	BRA	1.4 km	MPC · JPL
475459	2006 RK_{86}	—	September 15, 2006	Kitt Peak	Spacewatch	·	470 m	MPC · JPL
475460	2006 RY_{87}	—	September 15, 2006	Kitt Peak	Spacewatch	·	690 m	MPC · JPL
475461	2006 RM_{115}	—	September 14, 2006	Kitt Peak	Spacewatch	BRA	1.7 km	MPC · JPL
475462	2006 SW_{5}	—	September 16, 2006	Kitt Peak	Spacewatch	AMO	550 m	MPC · JPL
475463	2006 SW_{26}	—	September 16, 2006	Anderson Mesa	LONEOS	·	660 m	MPC · JPL
475464	2006 SH_{38}	—	September 18, 2006	Kitt Peak	Spacewatch	·	720 m	MPC · JPL
475465	2006 SX_{66}	—	September 15, 2006	Kitt Peak	Spacewatch	·	500 m	MPC · JPL
475466	2006 SL_{73}	—	September 19, 2006	Kitt Peak	Spacewatch	·	1.3 km	MPC · JPL
475467	2006 SL_{81}	—	September 18, 2006	Kitt Peak	Spacewatch	·	640 m	MPC · JPL
475468	2006 SN_{83}	—	September 18, 2006	Kitt Peak	Spacewatch	·	620 m	MPC · JPL
475469	2006 SU_{89}	—	September 18, 2006	Kitt Peak	Spacewatch	EOS	1.7 km	MPC · JPL
475470	2006 ST_{92}	—	September 18, 2006	Kitt Peak	Spacewatch	·	520 m	MPC · JPL
475471	2006 SC_{93}	—	September 18, 2006	Kitt Peak	Spacewatch	EOS	1.2 km	MPC · JPL
475472	2006 SP_{116}	—	September 24, 2006	Kitt Peak	Spacewatch	·	1.8 km	MPC · JPL
475473	2006 SD_{117}	—	September 24, 2006	Kitt Peak	Spacewatch	·	1.3 km	MPC · JPL
475474	2006 SZ_{152}	—	September 20, 2006	Kitt Peak	Spacewatch	·	560 m	MPC · JPL
475475	2006 SM_{158}	—	September 15, 2006	Kitt Peak	Spacewatch	·	1.4 km	MPC · JPL
475476	2006 SM_{163}	—	September 24, 2006	Kitt Peak	Spacewatch	·	1.5 km	MPC · JPL
475477	2006 SL_{169}	—	June 3, 2005	Kitt Peak	Spacewatch	·	1.6 km	MPC · JPL
475478	2006 ST_{175}	—	August 19, 2006	Kitt Peak	Spacewatch	·	480 m	MPC · JPL
475479	2006 SQ_{176}	—	September 25, 2006	Kitt Peak	Spacewatch	EOS	1.4 km	MPC · JPL
475480	2006 SE_{185}	—	September 25, 2006	Mount Lemmon	Mount Lemmon Survey	·	480 m	MPC · JPL
475481	2006 SR_{185}	—	September 25, 2006	Mount Lemmon	Mount Lemmon Survey	EOS	1.4 km	MPC · JPL
475482	2006 SQ_{193}	—	September 16, 2006	Kitt Peak	Spacewatch	·	1.6 km	MPC · JPL
475483	2006 SF_{212}	—	September 26, 2006	Mount Lemmon	Mount Lemmon Survey	·	570 m	MPC · JPL
475484	2006 SE_{215}	—	August 28, 2006	Catalina	CSS	·	660 m	MPC · JPL
475485	2006 SM_{226}	—	September 18, 2006	Kitt Peak	Spacewatch	·	440 m	MPC · JPL
475486	2006 SX_{245}	—	September 15, 2006	Kitt Peak	Spacewatch	KOR	1.3 km	MPC · JPL
475487	2006 SM_{252}	—	September 26, 2006	Kitt Peak	Spacewatch	·	1.6 km	MPC · JPL
475488	2006 SP_{253}	—	September 26, 2006	Mount Lemmon	Mount Lemmon Survey	·	1.2 km	MPC · JPL
475489	2006 SF_{258}	—	September 26, 2006	Kitt Peak	Spacewatch	·	1.2 km	MPC · JPL
475490	2006 SS_{260}	—	September 14, 2006	Kitt Peak	Spacewatch	·	1.5 km	MPC · JPL
475491	2006 SG_{263}	—	September 26, 2006	Kitt Peak	Spacewatch	·	700 m	MPC · JPL
475492	2006 SZ_{264}	—	September 26, 2006	Kitt Peak	Spacewatch	·	700 m	MPC · JPL
475493	2006 SL_{265}	—	September 26, 2006	Kitt Peak	Spacewatch	·	640 m	MPC · JPL
475494	2006 SP_{265}	—	September 26, 2006	Kitt Peak	Spacewatch	·	700 m	MPC · JPL
475495	2006 SH_{267}	—	September 26, 2006	Kitt Peak	Spacewatch	EOS	1.7 km	MPC · JPL
475496	2006 SN_{268}	—	September 26, 2006	Kitt Peak	Spacewatch	·	490 m	MPC · JPL
475497	2006 SV_{271}	—	September 27, 2006	Mount Lemmon	Mount Lemmon Survey	·	630 m	MPC · JPL
475498	2006 SC_{286}	—	September 18, 2006	Catalina	CSS	·	810 m	MPC · JPL
475499	2006 SU_{295}	—	September 25, 2006	Kitt Peak	Spacewatch	·	1.7 km	MPC · JPL
475500	2006 SO_{301}	—	September 26, 2006	Kitt Peak	Spacewatch	H	390 m	MPC · JPL

== 475501–475600 ==
back to top

Designation			Discovery			Properties		Ref
Permanent	Provisional	Named after	Date	Site	Discoverer(s)	Category	Diam.	Ref
475501	2006 SW_{307}	—	September 27, 2006	Kitt Peak	Spacewatch	·	750 m	MPC · JPL
475502	2006 SR_{310}	—	September 27, 2006	Kitt Peak	Spacewatch	EOS	1.6 km	MPC · JPL
475503	2006 SR_{314}	—	September 17, 2006	Kitt Peak	Spacewatch	·	2.0 km	MPC · JPL
475504	2006 SZ_{315}	—	September 17, 2006	Kitt Peak	Spacewatch	H	540 m	MPC · JPL
475505	2006 SU_{325}	—	September 27, 2006	Kitt Peak	Spacewatch	·	2.3 km	MPC · JPL
475506	2006 SV_{327}	—	September 19, 2006	Kitt Peak	Spacewatch	KOR	1.1 km	MPC · JPL
475507	2006 SB_{329}	—	September 27, 2006	Kitt Peak	Spacewatch	·	2.2 km	MPC · JPL
475508	2006 SW_{330}	—	September 25, 2006	Kitt Peak	Spacewatch	·	560 m	MPC · JPL
475509	2006 SB_{336}	—	September 28, 2006	Kitt Peak	Spacewatch	·	610 m	MPC · JPL
475510	2006 SY_{337}	—	July 21, 2006	Mount Lemmon	Mount Lemmon Survey	·	650 m	MPC · JPL
475511	2006 SW_{342}	—	September 28, 2006	Kitt Peak	Spacewatch	·	1.9 km	MPC · JPL
475512	2006 SJ_{347}	—	September 18, 2006	Kitt Peak	Spacewatch	·	2.0 km	MPC · JPL
475513	2006 SS_{351}	—	September 30, 2006	Mount Lemmon	Mount Lemmon Survey	·	410 m	MPC · JPL
475514	2006 ST_{351}	—	September 30, 2006	Catalina	CSS	·	590 m	MPC · JPL
475515	2006 SB_{358}	—	September 30, 2006	Mount Lemmon	Mount Lemmon Survey	EOS	1.5 km	MPC · JPL
475516	2006 SK_{364}	—	September 28, 2006	Mount Lemmon	Mount Lemmon Survey	EOS	1.9 km	MPC · JPL
475517	2006 SJ_{367}	—	September 25, 2006	Catalina	CSS	·	830 m	MPC · JPL
475518	2006 SC_{372}	—	September 30, 2006	Mount Lemmon	Mount Lemmon Survey	H	400 m	MPC · JPL
475519	2006 SZ_{374}	—	September 16, 2006	Apache Point	A. C. Becker	·	1.7 km	MPC · JPL
475520	2006 SA_{382}	—	September 28, 2006	Apache Point	A. C. Becker	EOS	1.4 km	MPC · JPL
475521	2006 SJ_{386}	—	September 29, 2006	Apache Point	A. C. Becker	EOS	1.5 km	MPC · JPL
475522	2006 SE_{391}	—	September 17, 2006	Kitt Peak	Spacewatch	EOS	1.4 km	MPC · JPL
475523	2006 ST_{394}	—	September 17, 2006	Kitt Peak	Spacewatch	KOR	1.1 km	MPC · JPL
475524	2006 SL_{396}	—	September 17, 2006	Kitt Peak	Spacewatch	·	1.5 km	MPC · JPL
475525	2006 SM_{397}	—	September 25, 2006	Kitt Peak	Spacewatch	·	560 m	MPC · JPL
475526	2006 SG_{398}	—	September 30, 2006	Mount Lemmon	Mount Lemmon Survey	·	2.0 km	MPC · JPL
475527	2006 SV_{398}	—	September 17, 2006	Kitt Peak	Spacewatch	·	590 m	MPC · JPL
475528	2006 SX_{398}	—	September 17, 2006	Kitt Peak	Spacewatch	·	1.6 km	MPC · JPL
475529	2006 SO_{403}	—	September 27, 2006	Mount Lemmon	Mount Lemmon Survey	·	2.2 km	MPC · JPL
475530	2006 SB_{407}	—	September 18, 2006	Catalina	CSS	·	630 m	MPC · JPL
475531	2006 SB_{411}	—	September 25, 2006	Kitt Peak	Spacewatch	TEL	1.0 km	MPC · JPL
475532	2006 SD_{412}	—	September 25, 2006	Mount Lemmon	Mount Lemmon Survey	·	1.5 km	MPC · JPL
475533	2006 SK_{412}	—	September 27, 2006	Mount Lemmon	Mount Lemmon Survey	EOS	1.5 km	MPC · JPL
475534	2006 TS_{7}	—	October 11, 2006	Palomar	NEAT	ATE · PHA	200 m	MPC · JPL
475535	2006 TN_{10}	—	September 19, 2006	Catalina	CSS	·	1.7 km	MPC · JPL
475536	2006 TO_{11}	—	September 25, 2006	Kitt Peak	Spacewatch	·	5.2 km	MPC · JPL
475537	2006 TA_{15}	—	October 11, 2006	Kitt Peak	Spacewatch	·	1.9 km	MPC · JPL
475538	2006 TD_{17}	—	October 11, 2006	Kitt Peak	Spacewatch	·	720 m	MPC · JPL
475539	2006 TJ_{18}	—	October 11, 2006	Kitt Peak	Spacewatch	·	1.9 km	MPC · JPL
475540	2006 TA_{19}	—	October 2, 2006	Mount Lemmon	Mount Lemmon Survey	·	1.9 km	MPC · JPL
475541	2006 TB_{19}	—	September 28, 2006	Mount Lemmon	Mount Lemmon Survey	·	660 m	MPC · JPL
475542	2006 TB_{26}	—	October 12, 2006	Kitt Peak	Spacewatch	·	1.4 km	MPC · JPL
475543	2006 TB_{28}	—	September 30, 2006	Mount Lemmon	Mount Lemmon Survey	·	1.8 km	MPC · JPL
475544	2006 TB_{30}	—	September 30, 2006	Mount Lemmon	Mount Lemmon Survey	EOS	1.8 km	MPC · JPL
475545	2006 TG_{30}	—	October 12, 2006	Kitt Peak	Spacewatch	·	720 m	MPC · JPL
475546	2006 TL_{41}	—	October 12, 2006	Kitt Peak	Spacewatch	·	1.4 km	MPC · JPL
475547	2006 TR_{53}	—	October 12, 2006	Kitt Peak	Spacewatch	·	810 m	MPC · JPL
475548	2006 TB_{54}	—	October 12, 2006	Kitt Peak	Spacewatch	·	1.4 km	MPC · JPL
475549	2006 TR_{56}	—	October 13, 2006	Kitt Peak	Spacewatch	PHO	800 m	MPC · JPL
475550	2006 TX_{59}	—	September 30, 2006	Mount Lemmon	Mount Lemmon Survey	·	2.1 km	MPC · JPL
475551	2006 TG_{69}	—	October 11, 2006	Palomar	NEAT	·	2.1 km	MPC · JPL
475552	2006 TR_{72}	—	October 3, 2006	Kitt Peak	Spacewatch	·	580 m	MPC · JPL
475553	2006 TL_{78}	—	September 30, 2006	Mount Lemmon	Mount Lemmon Survey	H	450 m	MPC · JPL
475554	2006 TS_{79}	—	October 13, 2006	Kitt Peak	Spacewatch	EOS	2.0 km	MPC · JPL
475555	2006 TB_{81}	—	October 2, 2006	Mount Lemmon	Mount Lemmon Survey	·	560 m	MPC · JPL
475556	2006 TW_{82}	—	October 4, 2006	Mount Lemmon	Mount Lemmon Survey	·	2.0 km	MPC · JPL
475557	2006 TB_{84}	—	October 4, 2006	Mount Lemmon	Mount Lemmon Survey	·	1.9 km	MPC · JPL
475558	2006 TU_{88}	—	October 13, 2006	Kitt Peak	Spacewatch	·	2.7 km	MPC · JPL
475559	2006 TM_{90}	—	October 13, 2006	Kitt Peak	Spacewatch	·	1.7 km	MPC · JPL
475560	2006 TP_{93}	—	October 2, 2006	Mount Lemmon	Mount Lemmon Survey	·	2.4 km	MPC · JPL
475561	2006 TK_{96}	—	October 12, 2006	Palomar	NEAT	·	910 m	MPC · JPL
475562	2006 TA_{100}	—	October 2, 2006	Mount Lemmon	Mount Lemmon Survey	·	620 m	MPC · JPL
475563	2006 TO_{103}	—	September 27, 2006	Mount Lemmon	Mount Lemmon Survey	·	1.8 km	MPC · JPL
475564	2006 TY_{112}	—	October 1, 2006	Apache Point	A. C. Becker	·	1.8 km	MPC · JPL
475565	2006 TZ_{121}	—	October 12, 2006	Kitt Peak	Spacewatch	·	1.3 km	MPC · JPL
475566	2006 TE_{122}	—	October 2, 2006	Mount Lemmon	Mount Lemmon Survey	·	580 m	MPC · JPL
475567	2006 TH_{123}	—	October 13, 2006	Kitt Peak	Spacewatch	·	1.6 km	MPC · JPL
475568	2006 TF_{126}	—	October 2, 2006	Mount Lemmon	Mount Lemmon Survey	·	1.4 km	MPC · JPL
475569	2006 TZ_{126}	—	October 3, 2006	Mount Lemmon	Mount Lemmon Survey	·	670 m	MPC · JPL
475570	2006 TS_{127}	—	October 11, 2006	Kitt Peak	Spacewatch	·	610 m	MPC · JPL
475571	2006 TV_{128}	—	September 17, 2006	Kitt Peak	Spacewatch	·	1.4 km	MPC · JPL
475572	2006 UH	—	September 16, 2006	Catalina	CSS	·	780 m	MPC · JPL
475573	2006 UC_{10}	—	October 16, 2006	Kitt Peak	Spacewatch	·	590 m	MPC · JPL
475574	2006 UJ_{10}	—	October 17, 2006	Mount Lemmon	Mount Lemmon Survey	·	890 m	MPC · JPL
475575	2006 UG_{13}	—	October 17, 2006	Mount Lemmon	Mount Lemmon Survey	·	550 m	MPC · JPL
475576	2006 UO_{27}	—	October 16, 2006	Kitt Peak	Spacewatch	·	1.6 km	MPC · JPL
475577	2006 UT_{27}	—	October 16, 2006	Kitt Peak	Spacewatch	·	550 m	MPC · JPL
475578	2006 UW_{27}	—	September 26, 2006	Mount Lemmon	Mount Lemmon Survey	·	1.6 km	MPC · JPL
475579	2006 UC_{29}	—	October 16, 2006	Kitt Peak	Spacewatch	KOR	1.3 km	MPC · JPL
475580	2006 UP_{32}	—	September 27, 2006	Mount Lemmon	Mount Lemmon Survey	·	1.6 km	MPC · JPL
475581	2006 UU_{32}	—	September 27, 2006	Mount Lemmon	Mount Lemmon Survey	·	660 m	MPC · JPL
475582	2006 UO_{33}	—	September 26, 2006	Mount Lemmon	Mount Lemmon Survey	·	570 m	MPC · JPL
475583	2006 UN_{34}	—	October 16, 2006	Kitt Peak	Spacewatch	KOR	1.2 km	MPC · JPL
475584	2006 UX_{37}	—	October 16, 2006	Kitt Peak	Spacewatch	·	1.6 km	MPC · JPL
475585	2006 UY_{39}	—	September 28, 2006	Mount Lemmon	Mount Lemmon Survey	EOS	1.5 km	MPC · JPL
475586	2006 UA_{42}	—	October 16, 2006	Kitt Peak	Spacewatch	·	1.5 km	MPC · JPL
475587	2006 UR_{42}	—	October 16, 2006	Kitt Peak	Spacewatch	·	1.5 km	MPC · JPL
475588	2006 UX_{42}	—	October 16, 2006	Kitt Peak	Spacewatch	KOR	1.2 km	MPC · JPL
475589	2006 UX_{45}	—	September 30, 2006	Mount Lemmon	Mount Lemmon Survey	·	710 m	MPC · JPL
475590	2006 UG_{46}	—	September 28, 2006	Mount Lemmon	Mount Lemmon Survey	·	2.5 km	MPC · JPL
475591	2006 UR_{50}	—	October 17, 2006	Kitt Peak	Spacewatch	·	650 m	MPC · JPL
475592	2006 UE_{60}	—	October 4, 2006	Mount Lemmon	Mount Lemmon Survey	·	680 m	MPC · JPL
475593	2006 UW_{60}	—	October 13, 2006	Kitt Peak	Spacewatch	·	2.0 km	MPC · JPL
475594	2006 UX_{73}	—	September 30, 2006	Kitt Peak	Spacewatch	·	730 m	MPC · JPL
475595	2006 UH_{77}	—	October 17, 2006	Kitt Peak	Spacewatch	·	1.9 km	MPC · JPL
475596	2006 UU_{79}	—	September 19, 2006	Kitt Peak	Spacewatch	·	1.3 km	MPC · JPL
475597	2006 UY_{81}	—	October 2, 2006	Mount Lemmon	Mount Lemmon Survey	·	750 m	MPC · JPL
475598	2006 UW_{84}	—	September 28, 2006	Mount Lemmon	Mount Lemmon Survey	·	2.0 km	MPC · JPL
475599	2006 UR_{86}	—	October 17, 2006	Mount Lemmon	Mount Lemmon Survey	·	1.7 km	MPC · JPL
475600	2006 UP_{87}	—	September 27, 2006	Mount Lemmon	Mount Lemmon Survey	·	2.2 km	MPC · JPL

== 475601–475700 ==
back to top

Designation			Discovery			Properties		Ref
Permanent	Provisional	Named after	Date	Site	Discoverer(s)	Category	Diam.	Ref
475601	2006 UC_{91}	—	September 27, 2006	Mount Lemmon	Mount Lemmon Survey	(2076)	770 m	MPC · JPL
475602	2006 UV_{92}	—	October 18, 2006	Kitt Peak	Spacewatch	·	750 m	MPC · JPL
475603	2006 UU_{117}	—	September 18, 2006	Kitt Peak	Spacewatch	·	2.0 km	MPC · JPL
475604	2006 UA_{128}	—	October 2, 2006	Mount Lemmon	Mount Lemmon Survey	·	1.5 km	MPC · JPL
475605	2006 UE_{129}	—	October 19, 2006	Kitt Peak	Spacewatch	·	590 m	MPC · JPL
475606	2006 UV_{130}	—	October 19, 2006	Kitt Peak	Spacewatch	·	1.3 km	MPC · JPL
475607	2006 UL_{133}	—	October 19, 2006	Kitt Peak	Spacewatch	·	2.2 km	MPC · JPL
475608	2006 UJ_{135}	—	September 30, 2006	Mount Lemmon	Mount Lemmon Survey	·	1.7 km	MPC · JPL
475609	2006 UJ_{136}	—	October 4, 2006	Mount Lemmon	Mount Lemmon Survey	EOS	1.5 km	MPC · JPL
475610	2006 UX_{137}	—	October 19, 2006	Kitt Peak	Spacewatch	TRE	2.1 km	MPC · JPL
475611	2006 UC_{139}	—	October 19, 2006	Kitt Peak	Spacewatch	·	760 m	MPC · JPL
475612	2006 UN_{144}	—	October 19, 2006	Kitt Peak	Spacewatch	·	2.2 km	MPC · JPL
475613	2006 UV_{154}	—	September 28, 2006	Mount Lemmon	Mount Lemmon Survey	·	1.3 km	MPC · JPL
475614	2006 UZ_{158}	—	October 2, 2006	Mount Lemmon	Mount Lemmon Survey	·	1.5 km	MPC · JPL
475615	2006 UK_{165}	—	October 21, 2006	Mount Lemmon	Mount Lemmon Survey	·	810 m	MPC · JPL
475616	2006 UD_{167}	—	October 2, 2006	Mount Lemmon	Mount Lemmon Survey	·	2.4 km	MPC · JPL
475617	2006 UM_{167}	—	October 21, 2006	Mount Lemmon	Mount Lemmon Survey	·	1.7 km	MPC · JPL
475618	2006 UF_{168}	—	October 21, 2006	Mount Lemmon	Mount Lemmon Survey	EOS	2.0 km	MPC · JPL
475619	2006 UT_{168}	—	October 21, 2006	Mount Lemmon	Mount Lemmon Survey	KOR	1.3 km	MPC · JPL
475620	2006 UC_{170}	—	October 21, 2006	Mount Lemmon	Mount Lemmon Survey	·	1.8 km	MPC · JPL
475621	2006 UN_{173}	—	October 22, 2006	Mount Lemmon	Mount Lemmon Survey	·	1.9 km	MPC · JPL
475622	2006 UP_{180}	—	October 16, 2006	Catalina	CSS	·	640 m	MPC · JPL
475623	2006 US_{186}	—	September 17, 2006	Anderson Mesa	LONEOS	BRA	1.6 km	MPC · JPL
475624	2006 UO_{192}	—	October 2, 2006	Mount Lemmon	Mount Lemmon Survey	·	2.3 km	MPC · JPL
475625	2006 UF_{198}	—	September 27, 2006	Mount Lemmon	Mount Lemmon Survey	·	760 m	MPC · JPL
475626	2006 UF_{199}	—	October 20, 2006	Kitt Peak	Spacewatch	·	640 m	MPC · JPL
475627	2006 UN_{199}	—	October 21, 2006	Mount Lemmon	Mount Lemmon Survey	H	380 m	MPC · JPL
475628	2006 UD_{213}	—	September 30, 2006	Mount Lemmon	Mount Lemmon Survey	·	1.7 km	MPC · JPL
475629	2006 UC_{216}	—	October 28, 2006	Calvin-Rehoboth	L. A. Molnar	·	580 m	MPC · JPL
475630	2006 UL_{219}	—	October 16, 2006	Kitt Peak	Spacewatch	·	3.2 km	MPC · JPL
475631	2006 UW_{223}	—	September 17, 2006	Catalina	CSS	·	3.3 km	MPC · JPL
475632	2006 UZ_{235}	—	October 23, 2006	Kitt Peak	Spacewatch	·	1.5 km	MPC · JPL
475633	2006 UX_{236}	—	October 23, 2006	Kitt Peak	Spacewatch	·	2.0 km	MPC · JPL
475634	2006 UD_{240}	—	September 28, 2006	Mount Lemmon	Mount Lemmon Survey	·	3.0 km	MPC · JPL
475635	2006 UD_{241}	—	September 28, 2006	Mount Lemmon	Mount Lemmon Survey	·	2.5 km	MPC · JPL
475636	2006 UQ_{241}	—	October 23, 2006	Kitt Peak	Spacewatch	·	1.8 km	MPC · JPL
475637	2006 UY_{241}	—	October 27, 2006	Kitt Peak	Spacewatch	EOS	1.6 km	MPC · JPL
475638	2006 UN_{252}	—	October 16, 2006	Kitt Peak	Spacewatch	·	1.7 km	MPC · JPL
475639	2006 UH_{254}	—	October 16, 2006	Kitt Peak	Spacewatch	·	1.7 km	MPC · JPL
475640	2006 UV_{254}	—	October 16, 2006	Kitt Peak	Spacewatch	EOS	1.6 km	MPC · JPL
475641	2006 US_{255}	—	October 27, 2006	Mount Lemmon	Mount Lemmon Survey	·	1.7 km	MPC · JPL
475642	2006 UC_{261}	—	October 20, 2006	Kitt Peak	Spacewatch	·	2.7 km	MPC · JPL
475643	2006 UL_{264}	—	October 27, 2006	Kitt Peak	Spacewatch	·	1.7 km	MPC · JPL
475644	2006 UP_{264}	—	October 27, 2006	Kitt Peak	Spacewatch	·	620 m	MPC · JPL
475645	2006 UK_{265}	—	September 30, 2006	Mount Lemmon	Mount Lemmon Survey	·	520 m	MPC · JPL
475646	2006 UN_{266}	—	October 27, 2006	Kitt Peak	Spacewatch	·	4.2 km	MPC · JPL
475647	2006 UA_{270}	—	October 19, 2006	Kitt Peak	Spacewatch	·	3.0 km	MPC · JPL
475648	2006 UJ_{279}	—	September 27, 2006	Mount Lemmon	Mount Lemmon Survey	EOS	1.6 km	MPC · JPL
475649	2006 UF_{282}	—	October 20, 2006	Kitt Peak	Spacewatch	·	520 m	MPC · JPL
475650	2006 UH_{284}	—	October 16, 2006	Kitt Peak	Spacewatch	·	630 m	MPC · JPL
475651	2006 UN_{285}	—	October 12, 2006	Kitt Peak	Spacewatch	KOR	1.2 km	MPC · JPL
475652	2006 UH_{289}	—	October 4, 2006	Mount Lemmon	Mount Lemmon Survey	·	1.6 km	MPC · JPL
475653	2006 UP_{289}	—	October 13, 2006	Kitt Peak	Spacewatch	·	1.4 km	MPC · JPL
475654	2006 UL_{334}	—	October 19, 2006	Mount Lemmon	Mount Lemmon Survey	·	1.7 km	MPC · JPL
475655	2006 UD_{337}	—	October 28, 2006	Mount Lemmon	Mount Lemmon Survey	·	2.0 km	MPC · JPL
475656	2006 UW_{339}	—	October 20, 2006	Kitt Peak	Spacewatch	·	2.3 km	MPC · JPL
475657	2006 UX_{339}	—	September 30, 2006	Mount Lemmon	Mount Lemmon Survey	·	560 m	MPC · JPL
475658	2006 UR_{341}	—	September 27, 2006	Mount Lemmon	Mount Lemmon Survey	KOR	1.1 km	MPC · JPL
475659	2006 UU_{346}	—	October 27, 2006	Mount Lemmon	Mount Lemmon Survey	EOS	1.9 km	MPC · JPL
475660	2006 UJ_{360}	—	September 30, 2006	Mount Lemmon	Mount Lemmon Survey	(2076)	710 m	MPC · JPL
475661	2006 VG_{9}	—	October 3, 2006	Mount Lemmon	Mount Lemmon Survey	·	2.0 km	MPC · JPL
475662	2006 VA_{10}	—	October 13, 2006	Kitt Peak	Spacewatch	·	2.3 km	MPC · JPL
475663	2006 VF_{10}	—	October 12, 2006	Kitt Peak	Spacewatch	·	1.8 km	MPC · JPL
475664	2006 VH_{12}	—	November 11, 2006	Mount Lemmon	Mount Lemmon Survey	·	660 m	MPC · JPL
475665	2006 VY_{13}	—	November 11, 2006	Mount Lemmon	Mount Lemmon Survey	T_{j} (2.96) · AMO +1km	1.3 km	MPC · JPL
475666	2006 VQ_{16}	—	November 9, 2006	Kitt Peak	Spacewatch	·	1.8 km	MPC · JPL
475667	2006 VU_{16}	—	October 31, 2006	Mount Lemmon	Mount Lemmon Survey	·	1.8 km	MPC · JPL
475668	2006 VR_{18}	—	October 13, 2006	Kitt Peak	Spacewatch	·	600 m	MPC · JPL
475669	2006 VV_{23}	—	September 27, 2006	Mount Lemmon	Mount Lemmon Survey	·	1.7 km	MPC · JPL
475670	2006 VQ_{27}	—	October 21, 2006	Kitt Peak	Spacewatch	EOS	1.8 km	MPC · JPL
475671	2006 VK_{28}	—	November 10, 2006	Kitt Peak	Spacewatch	EOS	1.5 km	MPC · JPL
475672	2006 VE_{41}	—	October 28, 2006	Mount Lemmon	Mount Lemmon Survey	·	2.4 km	MPC · JPL
475673	2006 VQ_{44}	—	October 3, 2006	Mount Lemmon	Mount Lemmon Survey	·	2.9 km	MPC · JPL
475674	2006 VE_{46}	—	October 13, 2006	Kitt Peak	Spacewatch	·	1.3 km	MPC · JPL
475675	2006 VF_{46}	—	October 31, 2006	Mount Lemmon	Mount Lemmon Survey	·	520 m	MPC · JPL
475676	2006 VH_{53}	—	November 11, 2006	Kitt Peak	Spacewatch	·	590 m	MPC · JPL
475677	2006 VA_{55}	—	October 23, 2006	Mount Lemmon	Mount Lemmon Survey	·	1.9 km	MPC · JPL
475678	2006 VO_{58}	—	October 22, 2006	Mount Lemmon	Mount Lemmon Survey	·	850 m	MPC · JPL
475679	2006 VH_{59}	—	November 11, 2006	Kitt Peak	Spacewatch	·	1.7 km	MPC · JPL
475680	2006 VZ_{63}	—	November 11, 2006	Kitt Peak	Spacewatch	·	610 m	MPC · JPL
475681	2006 VY_{64}	—	November 11, 2006	Kitt Peak	Spacewatch	·	2.0 km	MPC · JPL
475682	2006 VC_{72}	—	September 28, 2006	Mount Lemmon	Mount Lemmon Survey	·	630 m	MPC · JPL
475683	2006 VE_{79}	—	November 12, 2006	Mount Lemmon	Mount Lemmon Survey	·	740 m	MPC · JPL
475684	2006 VL_{80}	—	November 12, 2006	Mount Lemmon	Mount Lemmon Survey	·	660 m	MPC · JPL
475685	2006 VG_{81}	—	October 31, 2006	Mount Lemmon	Mount Lemmon Survey	·	3.1 km	MPC · JPL
475686	2006 VA_{88}	—	October 19, 2006	Mount Lemmon	Mount Lemmon Survey	·	2.8 km	MPC · JPL
475687	2006 VB_{91}	—	October 19, 2006	Kitt Peak	Spacewatch	·	630 m	MPC · JPL
475688	2006 VD_{93}	—	November 15, 2006	Mount Lemmon	Mount Lemmon Survey	·	2.5 km	MPC · JPL
475689	2006 VP_{93}	—	October 22, 2006	Kitt Peak	Spacewatch	·	3.3 km	MPC · JPL
475690	2006 VD_{97}	—	October 3, 2006	Kitt Peak	Spacewatch	·	570 m	MPC · JPL
475691	2006 VD_{98}	—	October 22, 2006	Mount Lemmon	Mount Lemmon Survey	·	770 m	MPC · JPL
475692	2006 VQ_{102}	—	September 27, 2006	Mount Lemmon	Mount Lemmon Survey	·	2.9 km	MPC · JPL
475693	2006 VV_{105}	—	November 13, 2006	Kitt Peak	Spacewatch	EOS	1.5 km	MPC · JPL
475694	2006 VB_{108}	—	November 13, 2006	Kitt Peak	Spacewatch	·	600 m	MPC · JPL
475695	2006 VO_{112}	—	November 13, 2006	Palomar	NEAT	·	2.2 km	MPC · JPL
475696 Fisiocritico	2006 VY_{113}	Fisiocritico	November 13, 2006	San Marcello	L. Tesi, M. Mazzucato	·	750 m	MPC · JPL
475697	2006 VN_{115}	—	October 19, 2006	Mount Lemmon	Mount Lemmon Survey	·	550 m	MPC · JPL
475698	2006 VK_{117}	—	September 28, 2006	Mount Lemmon	Mount Lemmon Survey	·	2.2 km	MPC · JPL
475699	2006 VV_{117}	—	November 14, 2006	Kitt Peak	Spacewatch	·	600 m	MPC · JPL
475700	2006 VR_{118}	—	October 27, 2006	Mount Lemmon	Mount Lemmon Survey	·	2.5 km	MPC · JPL

== 475701–475800 ==
back to top

Designation			Discovery			Properties		Ref
Permanent	Provisional	Named after	Date	Site	Discoverer(s)	Category	Diam.	Ref
475701	2006 VU_{120}	—	November 14, 2006	Kitt Peak	Spacewatch	EOS	1.2 km	MPC · JPL
475702	2006 VS_{124}	—	November 14, 2006	Kitt Peak	Spacewatch	·	2.4 km	MPC · JPL
475703	2006 VS_{128}	—	November 15, 2006	Kitt Peak	Spacewatch	·	680 m	MPC · JPL
475704	2006 VN_{130}	—	November 15, 2006	Kitt Peak	Spacewatch	·	530 m	MPC · JPL
475705	2006 VU_{133}	—	October 20, 2006	Mount Lemmon	Mount Lemmon Survey	·	2.5 km	MPC · JPL
475706	2006 VB_{137}	—	November 15, 2006	Kitt Peak	Spacewatch	·	2.5 km	MPC · JPL
475707	2006 VG_{142}	—	November 10, 1996	Kitt Peak	Spacewatch	·	610 m	MPC · JPL
475708	2006 VC_{161}	—	November 9, 2006	Apache Point	Rose, A. E., A. C. Becker	KOR	930 m	MPC · JPL
475709	2006 VF_{170}	—	November 11, 2006	Mount Lemmon	Mount Lemmon Survey	·	840 m	MPC · JPL
475710	2006 VL_{170}	—	November 14, 2006	Mount Lemmon	Mount Lemmon Survey	·	860 m	MPC · JPL
475711	2006 VN_{171}	—	November 1, 2006	Mount Lemmon	Mount Lemmon Survey	V	500 m	MPC · JPL
475712	2006 VR_{171}	—	November 2, 2006	Mount Lemmon	Mount Lemmon Survey	·	770 m	MPC · JPL
475713	2006 VN_{173}	—	November 12, 2006	Mount Lemmon	Mount Lemmon Survey	EOS	1.5 km	MPC · JPL
475714	2006 WB_{4}	—	September 28, 2006	Catalina	CSS	·	790 m	MPC · JPL
475715	2006 WL_{4}	—	October 22, 2006	Mount Lemmon	Mount Lemmon Survey	H	460 m	MPC · JPL
475716	2006 WF_{10}	—	September 28, 2006	Mount Lemmon	Mount Lemmon Survey	·	2.0 km	MPC · JPL
475717	2006 WG_{10}	—	October 23, 2006	Mount Lemmon	Mount Lemmon Survey	·	1.5 km	MPC · JPL
475718	2006 WJ_{10}	—	September 28, 2006	Mount Lemmon	Mount Lemmon Survey	·	2.0 km	MPC · JPL
475719	2006 WV_{10}	—	November 16, 2006	Socorro	LINEAR	H	510 m	MPC · JPL
475720	2006 WK_{29}	—	November 22, 2006	Kitt Peak	Spacewatch	·	940 m	MPC · JPL
475721	2006 WW_{30}	—	September 27, 2006	Mount Lemmon	Mount Lemmon Survey	·	580 m	MPC · JPL
475722	2006 WQ_{31}	—	October 22, 2006	Mount Lemmon	Mount Lemmon Survey	·	530 m	MPC · JPL
475723	2006 WG_{33}	—	October 23, 2006	Mount Lemmon	Mount Lemmon Survey	EOS	1.3 km	MPC · JPL
475724	2006 WR_{36}	—	October 23, 2006	Mount Lemmon	Mount Lemmon Survey	·	2.2 km	MPC · JPL
475725	2006 WD_{38}	—	November 16, 2006	Kitt Peak	Spacewatch	·	2.2 km	MPC · JPL
475726	2006 WN_{38}	—	October 4, 2006	Mount Lemmon	Mount Lemmon Survey	·	760 m	MPC · JPL
475727	2006 WT_{38}	—	October 23, 2006	Mount Lemmon	Mount Lemmon Survey	·	1.6 km	MPC · JPL
475728	2006 WS_{39}	—	October 31, 2006	Mount Lemmon	Mount Lemmon Survey	THM	1.8 km	MPC · JPL
475729	2006 WB_{44}	—	October 23, 2006	Mount Lemmon	Mount Lemmon Survey	·	550 m	MPC · JPL
475730	2006 WV_{46}	—	November 16, 2006	Kitt Peak	Spacewatch	·	3.0 km	MPC · JPL
475731	2006 WC_{47}	—	November 10, 2006	Kitt Peak	Spacewatch	·	1.3 km	MPC · JPL
475732	2006 WQ_{54}	—	November 16, 2006	Kitt Peak	Spacewatch	·	640 m	MPC · JPL
475733	2006 WJ_{67}	—	November 17, 2006	Mount Lemmon	Mount Lemmon Survey	·	660 m	MPC · JPL
475734	2006 WG_{71}	—	November 18, 2006	Kitt Peak	Spacewatch	·	1.5 km	MPC · JPL
475735	2006 WZ_{74}	—	November 18, 2006	Kitt Peak	Spacewatch	·	1.6 km	MPC · JPL
475736	2006 WO_{77}	—	November 18, 2006	Kitt Peak	Spacewatch	·	2.0 km	MPC · JPL
475737	2006 WC_{79}	—	October 4, 2006	Mount Lemmon	Mount Lemmon Survey	·	1.9 km	MPC · JPL
475738	2006 WN_{83}	—	November 18, 2006	Kitt Peak	Spacewatch	·	2.5 km	MPC · JPL
475739	2006 WX_{88}	—	November 18, 2006	Mount Lemmon	Mount Lemmon Survey	·	790 m	MPC · JPL
475740	2006 WK_{89}	—	November 18, 2006	Kitt Peak	Spacewatch	·	2.1 km	MPC · JPL
475741	2006 WV_{93}	—	October 3, 2006	Mount Lemmon	Mount Lemmon Survey	·	1.0 km	MPC · JPL
475742	2006 WX_{96}	—	September 27, 2006	Mount Lemmon	Mount Lemmon Survey	·	1.3 km	MPC · JPL
475743	2006 WK_{97}	—	November 19, 2006	Kitt Peak	Spacewatch	·	580 m	MPC · JPL
475744	2006 WD_{99}	—	September 27, 2006	Mount Lemmon	Mount Lemmon Survey	·	1.5 km	MPC · JPL
475745	2006 WM_{99}	—	October 31, 2006	Mount Lemmon	Mount Lemmon Survey	·	580 m	MPC · JPL
475746	2006 WN_{102}	—	November 19, 2006	Kitt Peak	Spacewatch	fast	490 m	MPC · JPL
475747	2006 WR_{105}	—	November 19, 2006	Kitt Peak	Spacewatch	·	2.0 km	MPC · JPL
475748	2006 WT_{111}	—	November 19, 2006	Kitt Peak	Spacewatch	·	590 m	MPC · JPL
475749	2006 WG_{127}	—	November 22, 2006	Mount Lemmon	Mount Lemmon Survey	·	3.6 km	MPC · JPL
475750	2006 WU_{128}	—	November 23, 2006	7300	W. K. Y. Yeung	·	1.3 km	MPC · JPL
475751	2006 WS_{132}	—	November 18, 2006	Kitt Peak	Spacewatch	·	2.2 km	MPC · JPL
475752	2006 WG_{134}	—	October 13, 2006	Kitt Peak	Spacewatch	EOS	1.6 km	MPC · JPL
475753	2006 WL_{137}	—	November 19, 2006	Kitt Peak	Spacewatch	·	720 m	MPC · JPL
475754	2006 WJ_{141}	—	October 22, 2006	Mount Lemmon	Mount Lemmon Survey	·	610 m	MPC · JPL
475755	2006 WX_{152}	—	November 15, 2006	Catalina	CSS	·	2.2 km	MPC · JPL
475756	2006 WB_{153}	—	November 21, 2006	Mount Lemmon	Mount Lemmon Survey	·	3.5 km	MPC · JPL
475757	2006 WO_{153}	—	October 23, 2006	Mount Lemmon	Mount Lemmon Survey	·	3.6 km	MPC · JPL
475758	2006 WY_{160}	—	October 15, 2006	Kitt Peak	Spacewatch	·	2.1 km	MPC · JPL
475759	2006 WJ_{161}	—	November 11, 2006	Kitt Peak	Spacewatch	·	2.0 km	MPC · JPL
475760	2006 WB_{163}	—	October 22, 2006	Mount Lemmon	Mount Lemmon Survey	·	500 m	MPC · JPL
475761	2006 WF_{163}	—	October 19, 2006	Mount Lemmon	Mount Lemmon Survey	EOS	2.1 km	MPC · JPL
475762	2006 WW_{163}	—	October 22, 2006	Mount Lemmon	Mount Lemmon Survey	·	2.2 km	MPC · JPL
475763	2006 WE_{171}	—	November 11, 2006	Kitt Peak	Spacewatch	THM	1.8 km	MPC · JPL
475764	2006 WM_{171}	—	November 23, 2006	Kitt Peak	Spacewatch	VER	2.5 km	MPC · JPL
475765	2006 WS_{173}	—	November 14, 2006	Kitt Peak	Spacewatch	EOS	1.8 km	MPC · JPL
475766	2006 WG_{182}	—	November 24, 2006	Mount Lemmon	Mount Lemmon Survey	EOS	1.9 km	MPC · JPL
475767	2006 WV_{183}	—	November 15, 2006	Mount Lemmon	Mount Lemmon Survey	·	1.1 km	MPC · JPL
475768	2006 WZ_{188}	—	November 11, 2006	Kitt Peak	Spacewatch	·	2.6 km	MPC · JPL
475769	2006 WC_{189}	—	November 11, 2006	Mount Lemmon	Mount Lemmon Survey	·	2.1 km	MPC · JPL
475770	2006 WE_{192}	—	November 11, 2006	Kitt Peak	Spacewatch	·	660 m	MPC · JPL
475771	2006 WQ_{192}	—	November 27, 2006	Kitt Peak	Spacewatch	THM	1.5 km	MPC · JPL
475772	2006 WT_{193}	—	November 27, 2006	Mount Lemmon	Mount Lemmon Survey	EOS	1.6 km	MPC · JPL
475773	2006 WC_{195}	—	September 27, 2006	Mount Lemmon	Mount Lemmon Survey	·	3.4 km	MPC · JPL
475774	2006 WY_{199}	—	November 16, 2006	Kitt Peak	Spacewatch	·	590 m	MPC · JPL
475775	2006 WS_{200}	—	November 22, 2006	Mount Lemmon	Mount Lemmon Survey	·	2.4 km	MPC · JPL
475776	2006 WA_{201}	—	November 27, 2006	Mount Lemmon	Mount Lemmon Survey	·	670 m	MPC · JPL
475777	2006 WJ_{201}	—	November 16, 2006	Kitt Peak	Spacewatch	·	3.4 km	MPC · JPL
475778	2006 WA_{203}	—	November 19, 2006	Kitt Peak	Spacewatch	·	2.8 km	MPC · JPL
475779	2006 WR_{203}	—	November 16, 2006	Kitt Peak	Spacewatch	V	510 m	MPC · JPL
475780	2006 WZ_{204}	—	November 17, 2006	Kitt Peak	Spacewatch	V	490 m	MPC · JPL
475781	2006 XU_{1}	—	December 10, 2006	Ottmarsheim	C. Rinner	·	2.1 km	MPC · JPL
475782	2006 XN_{2}	—	November 16, 2006	Kitt Peak	Spacewatch	·	3.9 km	MPC · JPL
475783	2006 XR_{2}	—	December 12, 2006	7300	W. K. Y. Yeung	·	2.4 km	MPC · JPL
475784	2006 XA_{13}	—	November 16, 2006	Kitt Peak	Spacewatch	·	3.4 km	MPC · JPL
475785	2006 XV_{15}	—	February 8, 2002	Kitt Peak	Spacewatch	THM	2.0 km	MPC · JPL
475786	2006 XJ_{16}	—	December 10, 2006	Kitt Peak	Spacewatch	V	680 m	MPC · JPL
475787	2006 XP_{20}	—	November 14, 2006	Mount Lemmon	Mount Lemmon Survey	·	2.2 km	MPC · JPL
475788	2006 XR_{20}	—	November 22, 2006	Mount Lemmon	Mount Lemmon Survey	·	2.9 km	MPC · JPL
475789	2006 XL_{23}	—	December 12, 2006	Mount Lemmon	Mount Lemmon Survey	·	3.8 km	MPC · JPL
475790	2006 XV_{24}	—	November 17, 2006	Kitt Peak	Spacewatch	·	3.2 km	MPC · JPL
475791	2006 XQ_{29}	—	November 25, 2006	Kitt Peak	Spacewatch	·	1.7 km	MPC · JPL
475792	2006 XN_{31}	—	November 11, 2006	Kitt Peak	Spacewatch	·	2.0 km	MPC · JPL
475793	2006 XW_{34}	—	December 11, 2006	Kitt Peak	Spacewatch	·	650 m	MPC · JPL
475794	2006 XD_{35}	—	December 11, 2006	Kitt Peak	Spacewatch	HYG	2.7 km	MPC · JPL
475795	2006 XU_{36}	—	December 1, 2006	Mount Lemmon	Mount Lemmon Survey	·	3.4 km	MPC · JPL
475796	2006 XW_{38}	—	December 11, 2006	Kitt Peak	Spacewatch	·	3.7 km	MPC · JPL
475797	2006 XP_{43}	—	December 12, 2006	Kitt Peak	Spacewatch	·	1.7 km	MPC · JPL
475798	2006 XH_{54}	—	December 15, 2006	Kitt Peak	Spacewatch	·	2.7 km	MPC · JPL
475799	2006 XM_{56}	—	November 17, 2006	Mount Lemmon	Mount Lemmon Survey	·	2.7 km	MPC · JPL
475800	2006 XJ_{62}	—	December 15, 2006	Kitt Peak	Spacewatch	·	2.9 km	MPC · JPL

== 475801–475900 ==
back to top

Designation			Discovery			Properties		Ref
Permanent	Provisional	Named after	Date	Site	Discoverer(s)	Category	Diam.	Ref
475801	2006 XM_{62}	—	December 15, 2006	Kitt Peak	Spacewatch	·	610 m	MPC · JPL
475802 Zurek	2006 XU_{67}	Zurek	December 13, 2006	Mauna Kea	D. D. Balam	·	2.5 km	MPC · JPL
475803	2006 XV_{69}	—	November 22, 2006	Mount Lemmon	Mount Lemmon Survey	·	3.3 km	MPC · JPL
475804	2006 XT_{72}	—	December 15, 2006	Kitt Peak	Spacewatch	·	1.6 km	MPC · JPL
475805	2006 YJ_{1}	—	December 15, 2006	Kitt Peak	Spacewatch	·	760 m	MPC · JPL
475806	2006 YV_{4}	—	September 27, 2006	Mount Lemmon	Mount Lemmon Survey	·	2.6 km	MPC · JPL
475807	2006 YZ_{15}	—	December 16, 2006	Kitt Peak	Spacewatch	H	440 m	MPC · JPL
475808	2006 YU_{18}	—	December 23, 2006	Mount Lemmon	Mount Lemmon Survey	·	3.4 km	MPC · JPL
475809	2006 YH_{27}	—	December 21, 2006	Kitt Peak	Spacewatch	·	2.4 km	MPC · JPL
475810	2006 YN_{28}	—	December 21, 2006	Kitt Peak	Spacewatch	·	2.5 km	MPC · JPL
475811	2006 YZ_{28}	—	December 21, 2006	Kitt Peak	Spacewatch	·	770 m	MPC · JPL
475812	2006 YK_{30}	—	December 21, 2006	Kitt Peak	Spacewatch	·	820 m	MPC · JPL
475813	2006 YH_{52}	—	December 21, 2006	Kitt Peak	Spacewatch	V	500 m	MPC · JPL
475814	2006 YL_{52}	—	December 24, 2006	Mount Lemmon	Mount Lemmon Survey	·	740 m	MPC · JPL
475815	2006 YB_{54}	—	December 21, 2006	Kitt Peak	Spacewatch	·	2.9 km	MPC · JPL
475816	2006 YT_{55}	—	December 27, 2006	Mount Lemmon	Mount Lemmon Survey	PHO	1.0 km	MPC · JPL
475817	2007 AX_{6}	—	January 9, 2007	Kitt Peak	Spacewatch	·	5.8 km	MPC · JPL
475818	2007 AS_{9}	—	November 2, 2006	Mount Lemmon	Mount Lemmon Survey	·	3.6 km	MPC · JPL
475819	2007 AR_{11}	—	January 8, 2007	Mount Lemmon	Mount Lemmon Survey	V	620 m	MPC · JPL
475820	2007 AB_{13}	—	November 25, 2006	Kitt Peak	Spacewatch	·	800 m	MPC · JPL
475821	2007 AY_{16}	—	January 12, 1996	Kitt Peak	Spacewatch	·	3.0 km	MPC · JPL
475822	2007 AS_{20}	—	January 10, 2007	Kitt Peak	Spacewatch	·	2.3 km	MPC · JPL
475823	2007 AF_{21}	—	January 10, 2007	Mount Lemmon	Mount Lemmon Survey	·	840 m	MPC · JPL
475824	2007 AC_{23}	—	January 10, 2007	Mount Lemmon	Mount Lemmon Survey	·	2.0 km	MPC · JPL
475825	2007 AF_{26}	—	January 10, 2007	Mount Lemmon	Mount Lemmon Survey	H	470 m	MPC · JPL
475826	2007 AU_{30}	—	January 8, 2007	Mount Lemmon	Mount Lemmon Survey	·	890 m	MPC · JPL
475827	2007 BM	—	January 16, 2007	Socorro	LINEAR	·	3.6 km	MPC · JPL
475828	2007 BU_{3}	—	December 13, 2006	Kitt Peak	Spacewatch	·	3.1 km	MPC · JPL
475829	2007 BF_{4}	—	January 16, 2007	Catalina	CSS	EOS	2.1 km	MPC · JPL
475830	2007 BS_{6}	—	January 8, 2007	Kitt Peak	Spacewatch	H	590 m	MPC · JPL
475831	2007 BB_{12}	—	January 17, 2007	Kitt Peak	Spacewatch	PHO	960 m	MPC · JPL
475832	2007 BE_{12}	—	January 17, 2007	Kitt Peak	Spacewatch	·	880 m	MPC · JPL
475833	2007 BU_{12}	—	September 28, 2000	Kitt Peak	Spacewatch	·	1.7 km	MPC · JPL
475834	2007 BY_{13}	—	January 17, 2007	Kitt Peak	Spacewatch	THM	2.0 km	MPC · JPL
475835	2007 BG_{14}	—	January 17, 2007	Kitt Peak	Spacewatch	·	3.2 km	MPC · JPL
475836	2007 BB_{18}	—	December 27, 2006	Mount Lemmon	Mount Lemmon Survey	·	3.5 km	MPC · JPL
475837	2007 BF_{24}	—	January 17, 2007	Kitt Peak	Spacewatch	·	1.1 km	MPC · JPL
475838	2007 BM_{26}	—	January 24, 2007	Mount Lemmon	Mount Lemmon Survey	·	2.7 km	MPC · JPL
475839	2007 BN_{34}	—	January 24, 2007	Mount Lemmon	Mount Lemmon Survey	NYS	920 m	MPC · JPL
475840	2007 BX_{40}	—	December 20, 2006	Mount Lemmon	Mount Lemmon Survey	·	3.2 km	MPC · JPL
475841	2007 BV_{42}	—	December 27, 2006	Mount Lemmon	Mount Lemmon Survey	·	2.5 km	MPC · JPL
475842	2007 BS_{43}	—	December 24, 2006	Mount Lemmon	Mount Lemmon Survey	·	970 m	MPC · JPL
475843	2007 BS_{44}	—	January 25, 2007	Kitt Peak	Spacewatch	·	830 m	MPC · JPL
475844	2007 BT_{44}	—	January 25, 2007	Kitt Peak	Spacewatch	H	430 m	MPC · JPL
475845	2007 BZ_{46}	—	January 26, 2007	Kitt Peak	Spacewatch	·	2.5 km	MPC · JPL
475846	2007 BY_{47}	—	January 26, 2007	Kitt Peak	Spacewatch	·	890 m	MPC · JPL
475847	2007 BG_{48}	—	January 26, 2007	Kitt Peak	Spacewatch	·	1.0 km	MPC · JPL
475848	2007 BK_{48}	—	January 17, 2007	Kitt Peak	Spacewatch	·	750 m	MPC · JPL
475849	2007 BC_{55}	—	January 24, 2007	Mount Lemmon	Mount Lemmon Survey	·	3.5 km	MPC · JPL
475850	2007 BR_{55}	—	January 10, 2007	Kitt Peak	Spacewatch	·	3.3 km	MPC · JPL
475851	2007 BD_{56}	—	January 17, 2007	Kitt Peak	Spacewatch	·	3.1 km	MPC · JPL
475852	2007 BE_{57}	—	November 15, 2006	Mount Lemmon	Mount Lemmon Survey	·	3.2 km	MPC · JPL
475853	2007 BO_{57}	—	January 10, 2007	Kitt Peak	Spacewatch	·	760 m	MPC · JPL
475854	2007 BD_{60}	—	January 26, 2007	Kitt Peak	Spacewatch	·	2.5 km	MPC · JPL
475855	2007 BZ_{60}	—	January 27, 2007	Mount Lemmon	Mount Lemmon Survey	·	3.7 km	MPC · JPL
475856	2007 BZ_{64}	—	January 27, 2007	Mount Lemmon	Mount Lemmon Survey	·	910 m	MPC · JPL
475857	2007 BJ_{68}	—	January 27, 2007	Mount Lemmon	Mount Lemmon Survey	·	2.6 km	MPC · JPL
475858	2007 BQ_{76}	—	December 25, 2006	Kitt Peak	Spacewatch	·	3.2 km	MPC · JPL
475859	2007 BB_{77}	—	January 10, 2007	Kitt Peak	Spacewatch	·	3.1 km	MPC · JPL
475860	2007 BT_{79}	—	January 29, 2007	Kitt Peak	Spacewatch	VER	2.8 km	MPC · JPL
475861	2007 BU_{86}	—	December 21, 2006	Mount Lemmon	Mount Lemmon Survey	·	2.7 km	MPC · JPL
475862	2007 BH_{100}	—	January 17, 2007	Kitt Peak	Spacewatch	·	570 m	MPC · JPL
475863	2007 CG_{1}	—	December 24, 2006	Mount Lemmon	Mount Lemmon Survey	·	3.4 km	MPC · JPL
475864	2007 CA_{3}	—	February 6, 2007	Kitt Peak	Spacewatch	NYS	660 m	MPC · JPL
475865	2007 CU_{3}	—	February 6, 2007	Kitt Peak	Spacewatch	·	2.9 km	MPC · JPL
475866	2007 CM_{7}	—	January 17, 2007	Kitt Peak	Spacewatch	·	820 m	MPC · JPL
475867	2007 CU_{12}	—	January 17, 2007	Kitt Peak	Spacewatch	V	690 m	MPC · JPL
475868	2007 CZ_{12}	—	February 6, 2007	Palomar	NEAT	H	700 m	MPC · JPL
475869	2007 CB_{16}	—	February 6, 2007	Palomar	NEAT	·	770 m	MPC · JPL
475870	2007 CJ_{26}	—	November 21, 2006	Mount Lemmon	Mount Lemmon Survey	·	870 m	MPC · JPL
475871	2007 CA_{29}	—	January 27, 2007	Kitt Peak	Spacewatch	·	970 m	MPC · JPL
475872	2007 CO_{31}	—	February 6, 2007	Mount Lemmon	Mount Lemmon Survey	·	630 m	MPC · JPL
475873	2007 CJ_{34}	—	February 6, 2007	Mount Lemmon	Mount Lemmon Survey	·	3.3 km	MPC · JPL
475874	2007 CB_{35}	—	January 17, 2007	Kitt Peak	Spacewatch	·	2.9 km	MPC · JPL
475875	2007 CT_{35}	—	February 6, 2007	Mount Lemmon	Mount Lemmon Survey	·	960 m	MPC · JPL
475876	2007 CD_{36}	—	January 26, 2007	Kitt Peak	Spacewatch	·	2.1 km	MPC · JPL
475877	2007 CN_{43}	—	January 27, 2007	Mount Lemmon	Mount Lemmon Survey	·	560 m	MPC · JPL
475878	2007 CN_{45}	—	February 8, 2007	Palomar	NEAT	·	2.4 km	MPC · JPL
475879	2007 CP_{45}	—	February 8, 2007	Palomar	NEAT	V	740 m	MPC · JPL
475880	2007 CC_{49}	—	February 10, 2007	Mount Lemmon	Mount Lemmon Survey	VER	2.9 km	MPC · JPL
475881	2007 CV_{50}	—	October 23, 2006	Kitt Peak	Spacewatch	·	2.7 km	MPC · JPL
475882	2007 CB_{57}	—	February 9, 2007	Catalina	CSS	·	2.5 km	MPC · JPL
475883	2007 CH_{57}	—	January 17, 2007	Catalina	CSS	·	3.4 km	MPC · JPL
475884	2007 CB_{62}	—	February 10, 2007	Catalina	CSS	H	750 m	MPC · JPL
475885	2007 CK_{63}	—	January 23, 2007	Anderson Mesa	LONEOS	·	3.3 km	MPC · JPL
475886	2007 CP_{65}	—	February 15, 2007	Catalina	CSS	·	2.6 km	MPC · JPL
475887	2007 CE_{66}	—	February 9, 2007	Kitt Peak	Spacewatch	·	870 m	MPC · JPL
475888	2007 DM_{2}	—	February 16, 2007	Catalina	CSS	·	2.3 km	MPC · JPL
475889	2007 DR_{4}	—	February 16, 2007	Črni Vrh	Matičič, S.	·	1.8 km	MPC · JPL
475890	2007 DF_{26}	—	February 17, 2007	Kitt Peak	Spacewatch	·	2.6 km	MPC · JPL
475891	2007 DT_{27}	—	February 17, 2007	Kitt Peak	Spacewatch	·	1.2 km	MPC · JPL
475892	2007 DA_{28}	—	September 10, 2004	Kitt Peak	Spacewatch	·	2.9 km	MPC · JPL
475893	2007 DJ_{31}	—	February 17, 2007	Kitt Peak	Spacewatch	·	930 m	MPC · JPL
475894	2007 DH_{34}	—	February 17, 2007	Kitt Peak	Spacewatch	·	950 m	MPC · JPL
475895	2007 DU_{39}	—	November 21, 2006	Mount Lemmon	Mount Lemmon Survey	URS	3.5 km	MPC · JPL
475896	2007 DV_{40}	—	January 28, 2007	Mount Lemmon	Mount Lemmon Survey	·	2.5 km	MPC · JPL
475897	2007 DF_{45}	—	January 27, 2007	Kitt Peak	Spacewatch	·	2.4 km	MPC · JPL
475898	2007 DM_{49}	—	December 24, 2006	Catalina	CSS	·	1.4 km	MPC · JPL
475899	2007 DF_{50}	—	January 17, 2007	Kitt Peak	Spacewatch	NYS	1.1 km	MPC · JPL
475900	2007 DA_{54}	—	December 21, 2006	Mount Lemmon	Mount Lemmon Survey	·	3.1 km	MPC · JPL

== 475901–476000 ==
back to top

Designation			Discovery			Properties		Ref
Permanent	Provisional	Named after	Date	Site	Discoverer(s)	Category	Diam.	Ref
475901	2007 DU_{59}	—	February 9, 2007	Kitt Peak	Spacewatch	·	2.0 km	MPC · JPL
475902	2007 DG_{60}	—	January 27, 2007	Mount Lemmon	Mount Lemmon Survey	·	3.2 km	MPC · JPL
475903	2007 DK_{63}	—	January 29, 2007	Kitt Peak	Spacewatch	H	450 m	MPC · JPL
475904	2007 DN_{70}	—	February 21, 2007	Kitt Peak	Spacewatch	NYS	850 m	MPC · JPL
475905	2007 DO_{76}	—	February 22, 2007	Kitt Peak	Spacewatch	NYS	1.2 km	MPC · JPL
475906	2007 DQ_{80}	—	February 23, 2007	Mount Lemmon	Mount Lemmon Survey	·	680 m	MPC · JPL
475907	2007 DS_{81}	—	January 28, 2007	Mount Lemmon	Mount Lemmon Survey	PHO	870 m	MPC · JPL
475908	2007 DW_{82}	—	February 23, 2007	Kitt Peak	Spacewatch	·	2.1 km	MPC · JPL
475909	2007 DP_{88}	—	October 6, 2005	Kitt Peak	Spacewatch	·	1.8 km	MPC · JPL
475910	2007 DQ_{92}	—	February 23, 2007	Kitt Peak	Spacewatch	H	340 m	MPC · JPL
475911	2007 DZ_{94}	—	February 23, 2007	Kitt Peak	Spacewatch	·	3.8 km	MPC · JPL
475912	2007 DJ_{95}	—	February 23, 2007	Kitt Peak	Spacewatch	·	830 m	MPC · JPL
475913	2007 DK_{104}	—	February 27, 2007	Catalina	CSS	PHO	2.2 km	MPC · JPL
475914	2007 DR_{110}	—	February 21, 2007	Kitt Peak	Spacewatch	CYB	4.1 km	MPC · JPL
475915	2007 DR_{116}	—	February 16, 2007	Catalina	CSS	PHO	880 m	MPC · JPL
475916	2007 DO_{117}	—	February 26, 2007	Mount Lemmon	Mount Lemmon Survey	·	5.0 km	MPC · JPL
475917	2007 EG_{1}	—	January 27, 2007	Kitt Peak	Spacewatch	·	2.7 km	MPC · JPL
475918	2007 EG_{4}	—	January 27, 2007	Mount Lemmon	Mount Lemmon Survey	·	2.7 km	MPC · JPL
475919	2007 EE_{15}	—	January 28, 2007	Mount Lemmon	Mount Lemmon Survey	·	850 m	MPC · JPL
475920	2007 EG_{17}	—	January 27, 2007	Mount Lemmon	Mount Lemmon Survey	·	1.3 km	MPC · JPL
475921	2007 EV_{29}	—	March 9, 2007	Kitt Peak	Spacewatch	·	1.2 km	MPC · JPL
475922	2007 EZ_{41}	—	February 27, 2007	Kitt Peak	Spacewatch	·	1.1 km	MPC · JPL
475923	2007 ET_{43}	—	March 9, 2007	Kitt Peak	Spacewatch	·	970 m	MPC · JPL
475924	2007 EM_{45}	—	March 9, 2007	Kitt Peak	Spacewatch	·	870 m	MPC · JPL
475925	2007 EB_{46}	—	March 9, 2007	Mount Lemmon	Mount Lemmon Survey	·	920 m	MPC · JPL
475926	2007 EA_{51}	—	March 10, 2007	Mount Lemmon	Mount Lemmon Survey	·	3.0 km	MPC · JPL
475927	2007 EH_{51}	—	March 10, 2007	Palomar	NEAT	·	1.5 km	MPC · JPL
475928	2007 EK_{65}	—	March 10, 2007	Kitt Peak	Spacewatch	·	1.4 km	MPC · JPL
475929	2007 EN_{68}	—	March 10, 2007	Palomar	NEAT	·	2.9 km	MPC · JPL
475930	2007 EQ_{72}	—	March 10, 2007	Kitt Peak	Spacewatch	·	850 m	MPC · JPL
475931	2007 EL_{80}	—	March 11, 2007	Kitt Peak	Spacewatch	·	2.9 km	MPC · JPL
475932	2007 ET_{87}	—	March 13, 2007	Catalina	CSS	H	550 m	MPC · JPL
475933	2007 EL_{92}	—	March 10, 2007	Kitt Peak	Spacewatch	·	1.1 km	MPC · JPL
475934	2007 EC_{93}	—	February 22, 2007	Kitt Peak	Spacewatch	·	2.7 km	MPC · JPL
475935	2007 ER_{112}	—	March 11, 2007	Kitt Peak	Spacewatch	·	2.8 km	MPC · JPL
475936	2007 EO_{115}	—	March 13, 2007	Mount Lemmon	Mount Lemmon Survey	H	540 m	MPC · JPL
475937	2007 EQ_{122}	—	February 23, 2007	Socorro	LINEAR	·	1.0 km	MPC · JPL
475938	2007 EA_{128}	—	March 9, 2007	Mount Lemmon	Mount Lemmon Survey	·	960 m	MPC · JPL
475939	2007 EB_{132}	—	March 9, 2007	Mount Lemmon	Mount Lemmon Survey	·	830 m	MPC · JPL
475940	2007 EL_{148}	—	March 12, 2007	Mount Lemmon	Mount Lemmon Survey	·	1.1 km	MPC · JPL
475941	2007 ES_{162}	—	March 15, 2007	Mount Lemmon	Mount Lemmon Survey	V	590 m	MPC · JPL
475942	2007 EX_{170}	—	February 8, 2007	Kitt Peak	Spacewatch	H	370 m	MPC · JPL
475943	2007 EV_{173}	—	March 14, 2007	Kitt Peak	Spacewatch	·	2.8 km	MPC · JPL
475944	2007 EG_{179}	—	March 14, 2007	Kitt Peak	Spacewatch	NYS	940 m	MPC · JPL
475945	2007 EN_{189}	—	March 13, 2007	Mount Lemmon	Mount Lemmon Survey	·	1.1 km	MPC · JPL
475946	2007 EK_{192}	—	March 14, 2007	Kitt Peak	Spacewatch	NYS	1.2 km	MPC · JPL
475947	2007 ER_{218}	—	March 11, 2007	Kitt Peak	Spacewatch	·	3.2 km	MPC · JPL
475948	2007 EV_{219}	—	March 10, 2007	Mount Lemmon	Mount Lemmon Survey	·	2.9 km	MPC · JPL
475949	2007 EA_{224}	—	March 13, 2007	Mount Lemmon	Mount Lemmon Survey	·	960 m	MPC · JPL
475950	2007 FE_{1}	—	March 17, 2007	Catalina	CSS	APO	390 m	MPC · JPL
475951	2007 FG_{32}	—	March 20, 2007	Kitt Peak	Spacewatch	·	3.2 km	MPC · JPL
475952	2007 FU_{35}	—	March 23, 2007	Siding Spring	SSS	PHO	1.1 km	MPC · JPL
475953	2007 GR_{4}	—	April 11, 2007	Catalina	CSS	·	1.6 km	MPC · JPL
475954	2007 GV_{13}	—	March 14, 2007	Kitt Peak	Spacewatch	·	2.8 km	MPC · JPL
475955	2007 GL_{17}	—	April 11, 2007	Kitt Peak	Spacewatch	BRG	1.1 km	MPC · JPL
475956	2007 GF_{19}	—	April 11, 2007	Kitt Peak	Spacewatch	H	530 m	MPC · JPL
475957	2007 GD_{30}	—	March 13, 2007	Kitt Peak	Spacewatch	V	490 m	MPC · JPL
475958	2007 GQ_{64}	—	April 15, 2007	Kitt Peak	Spacewatch	NYS	1.0 km	MPC · JPL
475959	2007 GX_{68}	—	March 13, 2007	Kitt Peak	Spacewatch	·	1.4 km	MPC · JPL
475960	2007 HP_{3}	—	March 16, 2007	Mount Lemmon	Mount Lemmon Survey	·	2.4 km	MPC · JPL
475961	2007 HV_{16}	—	February 25, 2007	Mount Lemmon	Mount Lemmon Survey	·	1.1 km	MPC · JPL
475962	2007 HR_{59}	—	April 18, 2007	Mount Lemmon	Mount Lemmon Survey	·	840 m	MPC · JPL
475963	2007 HG_{63}	—	March 15, 2007	Mount Lemmon	Mount Lemmon Survey	CYB	4.3 km	MPC · JPL
475964	2007 HW_{70}	—	April 20, 2007	Kitt Peak	Spacewatch	·	1.1 km	MPC · JPL
475965	2007 HQ_{71}	—	December 24, 2005	Kitt Peak	Spacewatch	·	930 m	MPC · JPL
475966	2007 JV	—	April 24, 2007	Mount Lemmon	Mount Lemmon Survey	·	1.4 km	MPC · JPL
475967	2007 JF_{22}	—	January 8, 2007	Socorro	LINEAR	T_{j} (2.82) · AMO +1km	2.0 km	MPC · JPL
475968	2007 JV_{28}	—	May 10, 2007	Kitt Peak	Spacewatch	·	1.4 km	MPC · JPL
475969	2007 JC_{36}	—	April 22, 2007	Mount Lemmon	Mount Lemmon Survey	·	1.3 km	MPC · JPL
475970	2007 JM_{36}	—	May 15, 2007	Tiki	S. F. Hönig, Teamo, N.	·	1.1 km	MPC · JPL
475971	2007 KR_{1}	—	May 16, 2007	Kitt Peak	Spacewatch	·	1.2 km	MPC · JPL
475972	2007 LP_{22}	—	April 19, 2007	Mount Lemmon	Mount Lemmon Survey	·	1.1 km	MPC · JPL
475973	2007 LZ_{27}	—	April 25, 2007	Mount Lemmon	Mount Lemmon Survey	·	1.0 km	MPC · JPL
475974	2007 NM_{2}	—	June 24, 2007	Kitt Peak	Spacewatch	·	1.6 km	MPC · JPL
475975	2007 NK_{3}	—	July 14, 2007	Dauban	Chante-Perdrix	·	2.0 km	MPC · JPL
475976	2007 NL_{6}	—	July 10, 2007	Siding Spring	SSS	·	1.7 km	MPC · JPL
475977	2007 OO_{6}	—	June 15, 2007	Kitt Peak	Spacewatch	·	1.8 km	MPC · JPL
475978	2007 OE_{11}	—	July 19, 2007	Mount Lemmon	Mount Lemmon Survey	·	1.5 km	MPC · JPL
475979	2007 PM_{4}	—	July 16, 2007	Siding Spring	SSS	fast	1.6 km	MPC · JPL
475980	2007 PG_{16}	—	August 8, 2007	Socorro	LINEAR	·	1.6 km	MPC · JPL
475981	2007 PR_{18}	—	August 9, 2007	Socorro	LINEAR	·	1.4 km	MPC · JPL
475982	2007 PN_{19}	—	August 9, 2007	Socorro	LINEAR	·	1.6 km	MPC · JPL
475983	2007 PN_{21}	—	August 9, 2007	Socorro	LINEAR	EUN	1.5 km	MPC · JPL
475984	2007 PO_{23}	—	August 12, 2007	Socorro	LINEAR	JUN	1.2 km	MPC · JPL
475985	2007 PR_{27}	—	August 14, 2007	Pla D'Arguines	R. Ferrando	WIT	860 m	MPC · JPL
475986	2007 PZ_{33}	—	August 10, 2007	Kitt Peak	Spacewatch	·	1.8 km	MPC · JPL
475987	2007 PC_{36}	—	August 12, 2007	XuYi	PMO NEO Survey Program	·	1.9 km	MPC · JPL
475988	2007 PB_{37}	—	August 13, 2007	Socorro	LINEAR	·	1.7 km	MPC · JPL
475989	2007 PZ_{42}	—	August 9, 2007	Kitt Peak	Spacewatch	EUN · fast	1.3 km	MPC · JPL
475990	2007 PD_{43}	—	August 9, 2007	Socorro	LINEAR	·	1.5 km	MPC · JPL
475991	2007 PF_{47}	—	August 10, 2007	Kitt Peak	Spacewatch	·	1.3 km	MPC · JPL
475992	2007 QU_{8}	—	August 23, 2007	Kitt Peak	Spacewatch	·	1.8 km	MPC · JPL
475993	2007 RF	—	September 1, 2007	Siding Spring	K. Sárneczky, L. Kiss	·	3.1 km	MPC · JPL
475994	2007 RS_{3}	—	September 3, 2007	Mount Lemmon	Mount Lemmon Survey	·	1.6 km	MPC · JPL
475995	2007 RR_{8}	—	September 8, 2007	Eskridge	G. Hug	AEO	1.1 km	MPC · JPL
475996	2007 RJ_{21}	—	September 3, 2007	Catalina	CSS	·	1.4 km	MPC · JPL
475997	2007 RM_{25}	—	September 4, 2007	Mount Lemmon	Mount Lemmon Survey	·	1.0 km	MPC · JPL
475998	2007 RY_{34}	—	September 6, 2007	Anderson Mesa	LONEOS	·	1.5 km	MPC · JPL
475999	2007 RR_{46}	—	September 9, 2007	Kitt Peak	Spacewatch	·	2.2 km	MPC · JPL
476000	2007 RY_{47}	—	September 9, 2007	Mount Lemmon	Mount Lemmon Survey	·	1.4 km	MPC · JPL

back to top

== Meaning of names ==
As minor planet discoveries are confirmed, they are given a permanent number by the IAU's Minor Planet Center (MPC), and the discoverers can then submit names for them, following the IAU's naming conventions. The list below concerns those minor planets in the specified number-range that have received names, and explains the meanings of those names.

Official naming citations of newly named small Solar System bodies are approved and published in a bulletin by IAU's Working Group for Small Bodies Nomenclature (WGSBN). Before May 2021, citations were published in MPC's Minor Planet Circulars for many decades. Recent citations can also be found on the JPL Small-Body Database (SBDB). Until his death in 2016, German astronomer Lutz D. Schmadel compiled these citations into the Dictionary of Minor Planet Names (DMP) and regularly updated the collection.

Based on Paul Herget's The Names of the Minor Planets, Schmadel also researched the unclear origin of numerous asteroids, most of which had been named prior to World War II. This article incorporates text from this source, which is in the public domain: SBDB New namings may only be added to this list below after official publication as the preannouncement of names is condemned. The WGSBN publishes a comprehensive guideline for the naming rules of non-cometary small Solar System bodies.

Named minor planet	Provisional	This minor planet was named for...	Ref · Catalog
475080 Jarry	2005 UR_{157}	Alfred Jarry (1873–1907), a French poet, writer and dramatist, who is best known for his play Ubu Roi.	IAU · 475080
475696 Fisiocritico	2006 VY_{113}	Dedicated to the Academy of Sciences of Siena (also known as the Fisiocritici) founded on 1691 March 17 by Pirro Maria Gabbrielli (1643–1705).	IAU · 475696
475802 Zurek	2006 XU_{67}	David R. Zurek (born 1966) is an authority on far-ultraviolet variables in dense stellar fields. He is currently the Data Collections Manager in the Department of Astrophysics in the American Museum of Natural History.	JPL · 475802
