= List of minor planets: 155001–156000 =

The following is a partial list of minor planets, running from minor-planet number 155001 through 156000, inclusive. The primary data for this and other partial lists is based on JPL's "Small-Body Orbital Elements" and data available from the Minor Planet Center. Critical list information is also provided by the MPC, unless otherwise specified from Lowell Observatory. A detailed description of the table's columns and additional sources are given on the main page including a complete list of every page in this series, and a statistical break-up on the dynamical classification of minor planets.

Also see the summary list of all named bodies in numerical and alphabetical order, and the corresponding naming citations for the number range of this particular list. New namings may only be added to this list after official publication, as the preannouncement of names is condemned by the Working Group for Small Bodies Nomenclature of the International Astronomical Union.

Near-Earth obj.	MBA (inner)	MBA (outer)	Centaur
Mars-crosser	MBA (middle)	Jupiter trojan	Trans-Neptunian obj.
Unclassified

== 155001–155100 ==
Designation			Discovery			Properties		Ref
Permanent	Provisional	Named after	Date	Site	Discoverer(s)	Category	Diam.	Ref
155001	2005 NT_{62}	—	July 11, 2005	Kitt Peak	Spacewatch	·	1.2 km	MPC · JPL
155002	2005 NN_{102}	—	July 12, 2005	Catalina	CSS	·	2.4 km	MPC · JPL
155003	2005 NX_{102}	—	July 10, 2005	Catalina	CSS	·	6.0 km	MPC · JPL
155004	2005 OY_{9}	—	July 27, 2005	Palomar	NEAT	EUN	1.6 km	MPC · JPL
155005	2005 OP_{14}	—	July 31, 2005	Siding Spring	SSS	·	1.5 km	MPC · JPL
155006	2005 OU_{14}	—	July 31, 2005	Siding Spring	SSS	·	1.9 km	MPC · JPL
155007	2005 OB_{15}	—	July 28, 2005	Reedy Creek	J. Broughton	·	3.0 km	MPC · JPL
155008	2005 OM_{16}	—	July 29, 2005	Palomar	NEAT	·	1.2 km	MPC · JPL
155009	2005 OA_{19}	—	July 31, 2005	Palomar	NEAT	·	1.8 km	MPC · JPL
155010	2005 PR_{9}	—	August 4, 2005	Palomar	NEAT	NYS	1.3 km	MPC · JPL
155011	2005 PR_{17}	—	August 6, 2005	Siding Spring	SSS	·	4.9 km	MPC · JPL
155012	2005 QM_{4}	—	August 24, 2005	Palomar	NEAT	MAS	1.2 km	MPC · JPL
155013	2005 QK_{7}	—	August 24, 2005	Palomar	NEAT	NYS	1.4 km	MPC · JPL
155014	2005 QG_{12}	—	August 24, 2005	Palomar	NEAT	·	2.8 km	MPC · JPL
155015	2005 QF_{17}	—	August 25, 2005	Palomar	NEAT	·	1.5 km	MPC · JPL
155016	2005 QS_{19}	—	August 25, 2005	Campo Imperatore	CINEOS	·	1.4 km	MPC · JPL
155017	2005 QK_{26}	—	August 27, 2005	Kitt Peak	Spacewatch	ADE	2.5 km	MPC · JPL
155018	2005 QK_{28}	—	August 28, 2005	Vicques	M. Ory	·	1.1 km	MPC · JPL
155019	2005 QY_{31}	—	August 24, 2005	Palomar	NEAT	NYS	1.5 km	MPC · JPL
155020	2005 QC_{38}	—	August 25, 2005	Palomar	NEAT	(194)	1.7 km	MPC · JPL
155021	2005 QD_{45}	—	August 26, 2005	Anderson Mesa	LONEOS	NYS	1.8 km	MPC · JPL
155022	2005 QP_{47}	—	August 26, 2005	Palomar	NEAT	·	1.2 km	MPC · JPL
155023	2005 QK_{54}	—	August 28, 2005	Kitt Peak	Spacewatch	·	1.1 km	MPC · JPL
155024	2005 QD_{67}	—	August 28, 2005	Anderson Mesa	LONEOS	·	1.3 km	MPC · JPL
155025	2005 QM_{71}	—	August 29, 2005	Socorro	LINEAR	·	3.3 km	MPC · JPL
155026	2005 QC_{73}	—	August 29, 2005	Socorro	LINEAR	·	3.9 km	MPC · JPL
155027	2005 QF_{75}	—	August 26, 2005	Anderson Mesa	LONEOS	·	2.8 km	MPC · JPL
155028	2005 QR_{82}	—	August 29, 2005	Socorro	LINEAR	·	3.7 km	MPC · JPL
155029	2005 QY_{82}	—	August 29, 2005	Anderson Mesa	LONEOS	·	2.8 km	MPC · JPL
155030	2005 QF_{84}	—	August 29, 2005	Anderson Mesa	LONEOS	·	3.8 km	MPC · JPL
155031	2005 QW_{94}	—	August 27, 2005	Palomar	NEAT	·	3.7 km	MPC · JPL
155032	2005 QP_{95}	—	August 27, 2005	Palomar	NEAT	·	1.3 km	MPC · JPL
155033	2005 QY_{116}	—	August 28, 2005	Kitt Peak	Spacewatch	NYS	1.5 km	MPC · JPL
155034	2005 QJ_{127}	—	August 28, 2005	Kitt Peak	Spacewatch	·	2.1 km	MPC · JPL
155035	2005 QV_{129}	—	August 28, 2005	Kitt Peak	Spacewatch	·	2.0 km	MPC · JPL
155036	2005 QH_{133}	—	August 28, 2005	Kitt Peak	Spacewatch	MAS	1.0 km	MPC · JPL
155037	2005 QP_{157}	—	August 31, 2005	Anderson Mesa	LONEOS	·	1.7 km	MPC · JPL
155038	2005 QR_{160}	—	August 28, 2005	Kitt Peak	Spacewatch	·	2.8 km	MPC · JPL
155039	2005 QY_{165}	—	August 31, 2005	Palomar	NEAT	EOS	2.7 km	MPC · JPL
155040	2005 QX_{171}	—	August 29, 2005	Palomar	NEAT	·	1.8 km	MPC · JPL
155041	2005 QZ_{172}	—	August 29, 2005	Palomar	NEAT	·	910 m	MPC · JPL
155042	2005 RQ_{5}	—	September 2, 2005	Campo Imperatore	CINEOS	·	1.7 km	MPC · JPL
155043	2005 RR_{5}	—	September 5, 2005	Haleakala	NEAT	·	1.7 km	MPC · JPL
155044	2005 RE_{8}	—	September 8, 2005	Socorro	LINEAR	·	3.1 km	MPC · JPL
155045	2005 RF_{8}	—	September 8, 2005	Socorro	LINEAR	NYS	2.2 km	MPC · JPL
155046	2005 RB_{10}	—	September 3, 2005	Palomar	NEAT	EUN	1.8 km	MPC · JPL
155047	2005 RO_{10}	—	September 8, 2005	Socorro	LINEAR	NYS	1.6 km	MPC · JPL
155048	2005 RH_{24}	—	September 11, 2005	Anderson Mesa	LONEOS	·	4.1 km	MPC · JPL
155049	2005 RJ_{27}	—	September 10, 2005	Anderson Mesa	LONEOS	·	5.0 km	MPC · JPL
155050	2005 RU_{27}	—	September 10, 2005	Anderson Mesa	LONEOS	V	1.0 km	MPC · JPL
155051	2005 RY_{30}	—	September 11, 2005	Anderson Mesa	LONEOS	·	3.5 km	MPC · JPL
155052	2005 SA_{3}	—	September 23, 2005	Catalina	CSS	MAS	1.2 km	MPC · JPL
155053	2005 SV_{9}	—	September 25, 2005	Kitt Peak	Spacewatch	EUN	2.3 km	MPC · JPL
155054	2005 SN_{19}	—	September 25, 2005	Rehoboth	Calvin College	·	1.4 km	MPC · JPL
155055	2005 SO_{23}	—	September 23, 2005	Catalina	CSS	EUN	1.6 km	MPC · JPL
155056	2005 SB_{24}	—	September 24, 2005	Anderson Mesa	LONEOS	·	1.9 km	MPC · JPL
155057	2005 SG_{24}	—	September 24, 2005	Anderson Mesa	LONEOS	·	2.8 km	MPC · JPL
155058	2005 SU_{24}	—	September 24, 2005	Anderson Mesa	LONEOS	V	1.2 km	MPC · JPL
155059	2005 SF_{28}	—	September 23, 2005	Kitt Peak	Spacewatch	·	1.0 km	MPC · JPL
155060	2005 SG_{28}	—	September 23, 2005	Kitt Peak	Spacewatch	·	1.4 km	MPC · JPL
155061	2005 ST_{30}	—	September 23, 2005	Catalina	CSS	V	1.2 km	MPC · JPL
155062	2005 SL_{32}	—	September 23, 2005	Kitt Peak	Spacewatch	HOF	4.3 km	MPC · JPL
155063	2005 SP_{35}	—	September 23, 2005	Kitt Peak	Spacewatch	·	1.6 km	MPC · JPL
155064	2005 SQ_{39}	—	September 24, 2005	Kitt Peak	Spacewatch	·	1.0 km	MPC · JPL
155065	2005 SL_{40}	—	September 24, 2005	Kitt Peak	Spacewatch	H	950 m	MPC · JPL
155066	2005 SR_{54}	—	September 25, 2005	Kitt Peak	Spacewatch	AGN	2.1 km	MPC · JPL
155067	2005 SH_{58}	—	September 26, 2005	Rehoboth	Calvin College	·	1.5 km	MPC · JPL
155068	2005 SC_{59}	—	September 26, 2005	Kitt Peak	Spacewatch	·	1.4 km	MPC · JPL
155069	2005 SA_{65}	—	September 26, 2005	Palomar	NEAT	·	1.2 km	MPC · JPL
155070	2005 SB_{69}	—	September 27, 2005	Kitt Peak	Spacewatch	·	2.1 km	MPC · JPL
155071	2005 SS_{71}	—	September 23, 2005	Catalina	CSS	·	1.1 km	MPC · JPL
155072	2005 SS_{73}	—	September 23, 2005	Kitt Peak	Spacewatch	·	2.2 km	MPC · JPL
155073	2005 SP_{77}	—	September 24, 2005	Kitt Peak	Spacewatch	MAS	910 m	MPC · JPL
155074	2005 SH_{90}	—	September 24, 2005	Kitt Peak	Spacewatch	·	1.9 km	MPC · JPL
155075	2005 SZ_{96}	—	September 25, 2005	Palomar	NEAT	·	1.0 km	MPC · JPL
155076	2005 SH_{103}	—	September 25, 2005	Palomar	NEAT	·	1.8 km	MPC · JPL
155077	2005 SX_{103}	—	September 25, 2005	Palomar	NEAT	·	3.6 km	MPC · JPL
155078	2005 SG_{104}	—	September 25, 2005	Kitt Peak	Spacewatch	THM	3.0 km	MPC · JPL
155079	2005 SM_{112}	—	September 26, 2005	Palomar	NEAT	·	2.6 km	MPC · JPL
155080	2005 SC_{130}	—	September 29, 2005	Anderson Mesa	LONEOS	·	1.2 km	MPC · JPL
155081	2005 SH_{130}	—	September 29, 2005	Anderson Mesa	LONEOS	·	1.8 km	MPC · JPL
155082	2005 SF_{131}	—	September 29, 2005	Catalina	CSS	·	1.8 km	MPC · JPL
155083 Banneker	2005 SE_{134}	Banneker	September 30, 2005	Calvin-Rehoboth	L. A. Molnar	·	2.4 km	MPC · JPL
155084	2005 ST_{137}	—	September 24, 2005	Kitt Peak	Spacewatch	·	2.9 km	MPC · JPL
155085	2005 SW_{147}	—	September 25, 2005	Kitt Peak	Spacewatch	·	1.8 km	MPC · JPL
155086	2005 SE_{148}	—	September 25, 2005	Kitt Peak	Spacewatch	·	1.2 km	MPC · JPL
155087	2005 SL_{149}	—	September 25, 2005	Kitt Peak	Spacewatch	·	2.4 km	MPC · JPL
155088	2005 ST_{158}	—	September 26, 2005	Kitt Peak	Spacewatch	ADE	5.8 km	MPC · JPL
155089	2005 SK_{159}	—	September 26, 2005	Kitt Peak	Spacewatch	·	3.1 km	MPC · JPL
155090	2005 SJ_{164}	—	September 27, 2005	Palomar	NEAT	·	1.7 km	MPC · JPL
155091	2005 SX_{164}	—	September 27, 2005	Palomar	NEAT	·	2.6 km	MPC · JPL
155092	2005 SX_{169}	—	September 29, 2005	Kitt Peak	Spacewatch	·	1.2 km	MPC · JPL
155093	2005 SP_{183}	—	September 29, 2005	Kitt Peak	Spacewatch	NYS	1.4 km	MPC · JPL
155094	2005 SB_{192}	—	September 29, 2005	Mount Lemmon	Mount Lemmon Survey	·	1.8 km	MPC · JPL
155095	2005 SJ_{193}	—	September 29, 2005	Kitt Peak	Spacewatch	·	1 km	MPC · JPL
155096	2005 SW_{203}	—	September 30, 2005	Anderson Mesa	LONEOS	HNS	1.9 km	MPC · JPL
155097	2005 SE_{211}	—	September 30, 2005	Palomar	NEAT	·	1.7 km	MPC · JPL
155098	2005 SF_{214}	—	September 30, 2005	Catalina	CSS	·	6.2 km	MPC · JPL
155099	2005 SP_{214}	—	September 30, 2005	Catalina	CSS	·	1.7 km	MPC · JPL
155100	2005 SX_{214}	—	September 30, 2005	Catalina	CSS	·	5.0 km	MPC · JPL

== 155101–155200 ==
back to top

Designation			Discovery			Properties		Ref
Permanent	Provisional	Named after	Date	Site	Discoverer(s)	Category	Diam.	Ref
155101	2005 SM_{218}	—	September 30, 2005	Palomar	NEAT	·	1.4 km	MPC · JPL
155102	2005 SB_{219}	—	September 30, 2005	Mount Lemmon	Mount Lemmon Survey	·	3.7 km	MPC · JPL
155103	2005 SC_{225}	—	September 29, 2005	Palomar	NEAT	·	1.8 km	MPC · JPL
155104	2005 SO_{225}	—	September 29, 2005	Catalina	CSS	EUN	2.0 km	MPC · JPL
155105	2005 SH_{227}	—	September 30, 2005	Kitt Peak	Spacewatch	·	1.0 km	MPC · JPL
155106	2005 SX_{231}	—	September 30, 2005	Mount Lemmon	Mount Lemmon Survey	·	930 m	MPC · JPL
155107	2005 SZ_{237}	—	September 29, 2005	Kitt Peak	Spacewatch	·	4.4 km	MPC · JPL
155108	2005 SW_{242}	—	September 30, 2005	Mount Lemmon	Mount Lemmon Survey	·	990 m	MPC · JPL
155109	2005 SM_{244}	—	September 30, 2005	Mount Lemmon	Mount Lemmon Survey	·	950 m	MPC · JPL
155110	2005 TB	—	October 1, 2005	Catalina	CSS	APO +1km	680 m	MPC · JPL
155111	2005 TP_{5}	—	October 1, 2005	Catalina	CSS	·	3.0 km	MPC · JPL
155112	2005 TU_{25}	—	October 1, 2005	Mount Lemmon	Mount Lemmon Survey	·	2.2 km	MPC · JPL
155113	2005 TO_{42}	—	October 3, 2005	Palomar	NEAT	·	2.5 km	MPC · JPL
155114	2005 TY_{42}	—	October 4, 2005	Catalina	CSS	V	1.0 km	MPC · JPL
155115	2005 TR_{46}	—	October 1, 2005	Anderson Mesa	LONEOS	·	3.8 km	MPC · JPL
155116 Verkhivnya	2005 TJ_{49}	Verkhivnya	October 8, 2005	Andrushivka	Andrushivka	LIX	5.5 km	MPC · JPL
155117	2005 TE_{50}	—	October 9, 2005	Goodricke-Pigott	Goodricke-Pigott	·	1.4 km	MPC · JPL
155118	2005 TK_{53}	—	October 12, 2005	RAS	Hutsebaut, R.	·	3.0 km	MPC · JPL
155119	2005 TR_{55}	—	October 6, 2005	Kitt Peak	Spacewatch	·	4.3 km	MPC · JPL
155120	2005 TW_{64}	—	October 1, 2005	Kitt Peak	Spacewatch	·	1.7 km	MPC · JPL
155121	2005 TE_{68}	—	October 5, 2005	Catalina	CSS	·	3.6 km	MPC · JPL
155122	2005 TZ_{72}	—	October 5, 2005	Catalina	CSS	EOS	2.8 km	MPC · JPL
155123	2005 TX_{78}	—	October 7, 2005	Catalina	CSS	·	4.3 km	MPC · JPL
155124	2005 TD_{99}	—	October 7, 2005	Catalina	CSS	·	1.3 km	MPC · JPL
155125	2005 TN_{107}	—	October 5, 2005	Kitt Peak	Spacewatch	3:2 · SHU	7.9 km	MPC · JPL
155126	2005 TY_{109}	—	October 7, 2005	Kitt Peak	Spacewatch	·	900 m	MPC · JPL
155127	2005 TX_{110}	—	October 7, 2005	Kitt Peak	Spacewatch	·	1.3 km	MPC · JPL
155128	2005 TM_{117}	—	October 7, 2005	Kitt Peak	Spacewatch	NYS	1.2 km	MPC · JPL
155129	2005 TT_{123}	—	October 7, 2005	Catalina	CSS	·	2.4 km	MPC · JPL
155130	2005 TH_{126}	—	October 7, 2005	Kitt Peak	Spacewatch	MAS	800 m	MPC · JPL
155131	2005 TQ_{127}	—	October 7, 2005	Kitt Peak	Spacewatch	·	2.8 km	MPC · JPL
155132	2005 TV_{132}	—	October 7, 2005	Kitt Peak	Spacewatch	MAS	1.0 km	MPC · JPL
155133	2005 TW_{140}	—	October 8, 2005	Kitt Peak	Spacewatch	·	900 m	MPC · JPL
155134	2005 TX_{152}	—	October 5, 2005	Catalina	CSS	·	1.6 km	MPC · JPL
155135	2005 TC_{165}	—	October 9, 2005	Kitt Peak	Spacewatch	·	4.0 km	MPC · JPL
155136	2005 TS_{166}	—	October 9, 2005	Kitt Peak	Spacewatch	·	1.7 km	MPC · JPL
155137	2005 TZ_{166}	—	October 9, 2005	Kitt Peak	Spacewatch	·	2.1 km	MPC · JPL
155138 Pučinskas	2005 TM_{169}	Pučinskas	October 9, 2005	Moletai	K. Černis, Zdanavicius, J.	MRX	1.7 km	MPC · JPL
155139	2005 TF_{173}	—	October 13, 2005	Socorro	LINEAR	·	1.3 km	MPC · JPL
155140	2005 UD	—	October 22, 2005	Catalina	CSS	APO +1km	1.1 km	MPC · JPL
155141	2005 UY	—	October 20, 2005	Junk Bond	D. Healy	·	1.2 km	MPC · JPL
155142 Tenagra	2005 UD_{4}	Tenagra	October 26, 2005	Tenagra II	J.-C. Merlin	·	2.3 km	MPC · JPL
155143	2005 UB_{10}	—	October 21, 2005	Palomar	NEAT	·	1.3 km	MPC · JPL
155144	2005 UG_{14}	—	October 22, 2005	Kitt Peak	Spacewatch	AST	2.9 km	MPC · JPL
155145	2005 UR_{18}	—	October 22, 2005	Kitt Peak	Spacewatch	·	1.6 km	MPC · JPL
155146	2005 UF_{29}	—	October 23, 2005	Catalina	CSS	·	1.8 km	MPC · JPL
155147	2005 UZ_{29}	—	October 23, 2005	Catalina	CSS	·	1.3 km	MPC · JPL
155148	2005 UC_{57}	—	October 24, 2005	Anderson Mesa	LONEOS	·	1.3 km	MPC · JPL
155149	2005 UE_{61}	—	October 25, 2005	Mount Lemmon	Mount Lemmon Survey	·	2.2 km	MPC · JPL
155150	2005 UL_{67}	—	October 22, 2005	Palomar	NEAT	·	3.2 km	MPC · JPL
155151	2005 UH_{69}	—	October 23, 2005	Palomar	NEAT	AGN	1.8 km	MPC · JPL
155152	2005 UE_{78}	—	October 25, 2005	Mount Lemmon	Mount Lemmon Survey	·	1.5 km	MPC · JPL
155153	2005 UV_{78}	—	October 25, 2005	Catalina	CSS	·	2.7 km	MPC · JPL
155154	2005 UW_{78}	—	October 25, 2005	Catalina	CSS	·	3.8 km	MPC · JPL
155155	2005 UD_{79}	—	October 25, 2005	Catalina	CSS	·	5.1 km	MPC · JPL
155156	2005 UR_{79}	—	October 25, 2005	Catalina	CSS	·	4.0 km	MPC · JPL
155157	2005 UF_{80}	—	October 25, 2005	Catalina	CSS	·	3.7 km	MPC · JPL
155158	2005 UL_{80}	—	October 25, 2005	Catalina	CSS	·	2.9 km	MPC · JPL
155159	2005 UK_{83}	—	October 22, 2005	Kitt Peak	Spacewatch	·	2.0 km	MPC · JPL
155160	2005 US_{96}	—	October 22, 2005	Kitt Peak	Spacewatch	·	1.8 km	MPC · JPL
155161	2005 UQ_{104}	—	October 22, 2005	Kitt Peak	Spacewatch	·	3.3 km	MPC · JPL
155162	2005 UZ_{104}	—	October 22, 2005	Kitt Peak	Spacewatch	·	3.7 km	MPC · JPL
155163	2005 UJ_{124}	—	October 24, 2005	Kitt Peak	Spacewatch	·	4.2 km	MPC · JPL
155164	2005 UN_{141}	—	October 25, 2005	Catalina	CSS	·	2.2 km	MPC · JPL
155165	2005 UU_{147}	—	October 26, 2005	Kitt Peak	Spacewatch	AGN	2.1 km	MPC · JPL
155166	2005 UU_{151}	—	October 26, 2005	Kitt Peak	Spacewatch	·	5.3 km	MPC · JPL
155167	2005 UG_{172}	—	October 24, 2005	Kitt Peak	Spacewatch	·	2.1 km	MPC · JPL
155168	2005 UC_{175}	—	October 24, 2005	Kitt Peak	Spacewatch	AGN	2.0 km	MPC · JPL
155169	2005 UF_{186}	—	October 25, 2005	Mount Lemmon	Mount Lemmon Survey	THM	2.7 km	MPC · JPL
155170	2005 UK_{191}	—	October 27, 2005	Mount Lemmon	Mount Lemmon Survey	KOR	2.0 km	MPC · JPL
155171	2005 UX_{205}	—	October 26, 2005	Kitt Peak	Spacewatch	·	1.2 km	MPC · JPL
155172	2005 UJ_{214}	—	October 24, 2005	Palomar	NEAT	BRA	2.5 km	MPC · JPL
155173	2005 US_{216}	—	October 25, 2005	Mount Lemmon	Mount Lemmon Survey	·	1.7 km	MPC · JPL
155174	2005 UA_{220}	—	October 25, 2005	Kitt Peak	Spacewatch	·	1.3 km	MPC · JPL
155175	2005 UP_{247}	—	October 28, 2005	Socorro	LINEAR	·	1.8 km	MPC · JPL
155176	2005 UH_{248}	—	October 28, 2005	Mount Lemmon	Mount Lemmon Survey	·	970 m	MPC · JPL
155177	2005 UR_{272}	—	October 28, 2005	Kitt Peak	Spacewatch	·	3.2 km	MPC · JPL
155178	2005 UX_{274}	—	October 28, 2005	Mount Lemmon	Mount Lemmon Survey	·	1.3 km	MPC · JPL
155179	2005 UH_{277}	—	October 24, 2005	Kitt Peak	Spacewatch	·	1.3 km	MPC · JPL
155180	2005 UF_{289}	—	October 26, 2005	Kitt Peak	Spacewatch	·	5.9 km	MPC · JPL
155181	2005 UY_{315}	—	October 25, 2005	Kitt Peak	Spacewatch	·	2.8 km	MPC · JPL
155182	2005 UL_{317}	—	October 27, 2005	Mount Lemmon	Mount Lemmon Survey	·	1.5 km	MPC · JPL
155183	2005 UB_{327}	—	October 29, 2005	Catalina	CSS	·	2.3 km	MPC · JPL
155184	2005 UW_{329}	—	October 28, 2005	Catalina	CSS	·	4.9 km	MPC · JPL
155185	2005 UX_{330}	—	October 28, 2005	Mount Lemmon	Mount Lemmon Survey	·	3.4 km	MPC · JPL
155186	2005 UY_{334}	—	October 29, 2005	Mount Lemmon	Mount Lemmon Survey	·	880 m	MPC · JPL
155187	2005 UC_{335}	—	October 29, 2005	Mount Lemmon	Mount Lemmon Survey	·	2.2 km	MPC · JPL
155188	2005 UM_{349}	—	October 25, 2005	Catalina	CSS	·	1.4 km	MPC · JPL
155189	2005 UN_{355}	—	October 29, 2005	Catalina	CSS	MAR	2.0 km	MPC · JPL
155190	2005 UV_{355}	—	October 29, 2005	Mount Lemmon	Mount Lemmon Survey	KOR	2.1 km	MPC · JPL
155191	2005 UZ_{365}	—	October 27, 2005	Kitt Peak	Spacewatch	·	2.7 km	MPC · JPL
155192	2005 UV_{371}	—	October 27, 2005	Mount Lemmon	Mount Lemmon Survey	·	1.8 km	MPC · JPL
155193	2005 UH_{377}	—	October 28, 2005	Socorro	LINEAR	·	1.6 km	MPC · JPL
155194	2005 UK_{381}	—	October 30, 2005	Mount Lemmon	Mount Lemmon Survey	KOR	1.8 km	MPC · JPL
155195	2005 UG_{396}	—	October 25, 2005	Kitt Peak	Spacewatch	·	2.8 km	MPC · JPL
155196	2005 UM_{419}	—	October 25, 2005	Kitt Peak	Spacewatch	V	1.3 km	MPC · JPL
155197	2005 UO_{429}	—	October 28, 2005	Kitt Peak	Spacewatch	·	2.4 km	MPC · JPL
155198	2005 UO_{432}	—	October 28, 2005	Kitt Peak	Spacewatch	MAS	1.0 km	MPC · JPL
155199	2005 UU_{433}	—	October 28, 2005	Kitt Peak	Spacewatch	·	3.7 km	MPC · JPL
155200	2005 UC_{438}	—	October 27, 2005	Kitt Peak	Spacewatch	·	2.7 km	MPC · JPL

== 155201–155300 ==
back to top

Designation			Discovery			Properties		Ref
Permanent	Provisional	Named after	Date	Site	Discoverer(s)	Category	Diam.	Ref
155201	2005 UL_{440}	—	October 29, 2005	Mount Lemmon	Mount Lemmon Survey	·	1.3 km	MPC · JPL
155202	2005 UU_{444}	—	October 30, 2005	Mount Lemmon	Mount Lemmon Survey	·	1.3 km	MPC · JPL
155203	2005 UV_{444}	—	October 30, 2005	Mount Lemmon	Mount Lemmon Survey	·	3.5 km	MPC · JPL
155204	2005 UX_{445}	—	October 31, 2005	Mount Lemmon	Mount Lemmon Survey	·	1.1 km	MPC · JPL
155205	2005 UV_{449}	—	October 30, 2005	Socorro	LINEAR	JUN	3.0 km	MPC · JPL
155206	2005 UP_{457}	—	October 31, 2005	Palomar	NEAT	MAR	2.1 km	MPC · JPL
155207	2005 UO_{460}	—	October 28, 2005	Mount Lemmon	Mount Lemmon Survey	·	1.3 km	MPC · JPL
155208	2005 UV_{460}	—	October 28, 2005	Mount Lemmon	Mount Lemmon Survey	·	2.4 km	MPC · JPL
155209	2005 UV_{481}	—	October 31, 2005	Catalina	CSS	HNS	2.0 km	MPC · JPL
155210	2005 UG_{483}	—	October 22, 2005	Catalina	CSS	·	1.6 km	MPC · JPL
155211	2005 UP_{485}	—	October 22, 2005	Catalina	CSS	·	2.3 km	MPC · JPL
155212	2005 UQ_{489}	—	October 23, 2005	Catalina	CSS	·	5.3 km	MPC · JPL
155213	2005 UU_{494}	—	October 25, 2005	Catalina	CSS	EOS	4.1 km	MPC · JPL
155214	2005 UK_{508}	—	October 25, 2005	Kitt Peak	Spacewatch	WIT	1.4 km	MPC · JPL
155215 Vámostibor	2005 VU_{2}	Vámostibor	November 4, 2005	Piszkéstető	K. Sárneczky	·	1.8 km	MPC · JPL
155216	2005 VV_{2}	—	November 5, 2005	Great Shefford	Birtwhistle, P.	·	3.3 km	MPC · JPL
155217 Radnóti	2005 VH_{5}	Radnóti	November 9, 2005	Piszkéstető	K. Sárneczky	·	2.2 km	MPC · JPL
155218	2005 VL_{7}	—	November 13, 2005	Socorro	LINEAR	slow	4.7 km	MPC · JPL
155219	2005 VX_{23}	—	November 1, 2005	Kitt Peak	Spacewatch	KOR	2.0 km	MPC · JPL
155220	2005 VM_{25}	—	November 2, 2005	Socorro	LINEAR	GEF	1.8 km	MPC · JPL
155221	2005 VT_{38}	—	November 3, 2005	Mount Lemmon	Mount Lemmon Survey	·	3.8 km	MPC · JPL
155222	2005 VY_{52}	—	November 3, 2005	Mount Lemmon	Mount Lemmon Survey	AGN	1.7 km	MPC · JPL
155223	2005 VH_{53}	—	November 3, 2005	Mount Lemmon	Mount Lemmon Survey	·	2.2 km	MPC · JPL
155224	2005 VW_{60}	—	November 5, 2005	Kitt Peak	Spacewatch	MAS	990 m	MPC · JPL
155225	2005 VR_{63}	—	November 1, 2005	Mount Lemmon	Mount Lemmon Survey	NYS	1.1 km	MPC · JPL
155226	2005 VV_{70}	—	November 1, 2005	Mount Lemmon	Mount Lemmon Survey	·	2.0 km	MPC · JPL
155227	2005 VD_{71}	—	November 1, 2005	Mount Lemmon	Mount Lemmon Survey	·	2.7 km	MPC · JPL
155228	2005 VB_{98}	—	November 7, 2005	Socorro	LINEAR	·	2.6 km	MPC · JPL
155229	2005 VD_{118}	—	November 15, 2005	Palomar	NEAT	·	1.4 km	MPC · JPL
155230	2005 VQ_{118}	—	November 15, 2005	Palomar	NEAT	·	7.6 km	MPC · JPL
155231	2005 WV_{2}	—	November 19, 2005	Palomar	NEAT	VER	4.4 km	MPC · JPL
155232	2005 WL_{5}	—	November 20, 2005	Palomar	NEAT	·	2.9 km	MPC · JPL
155233	2005 WO_{8}	—	November 21, 2005	Kitt Peak	Spacewatch	·	2.7 km	MPC · JPL
155234	2005 WK_{16}	—	November 22, 2005	Kitt Peak	Spacewatch	·	1.8 km	MPC · JPL
155235	2005 WX_{17}	—	November 22, 2005	Kitt Peak	Spacewatch	·	3.3 km	MPC · JPL
155236	2005 WO_{18}	—	November 22, 2005	Kitt Peak	Spacewatch	·	2.9 km	MPC · JPL
155237	2005 WP_{18}	—	November 22, 2005	Kitt Peak	Spacewatch	·	2.5 km	MPC · JPL
155238	2005 WY_{18}	—	November 22, 2005	Kitt Peak	Spacewatch	·	3.1 km	MPC · JPL
155239	2005 WB_{19}	—	November 22, 2005	Kitt Peak	Spacewatch	·	2.5 km	MPC · JPL
155240	2005 WO_{21}	—	November 21, 2005	Kitt Peak	Spacewatch	·	4.2 km	MPC · JPL
155241	2005 WO_{22}	—	November 21, 2005	Kitt Peak	Spacewatch	·	2.6 km	MPC · JPL
155242	2005 WQ_{24}	—	November 21, 2005	Kitt Peak	Spacewatch	HYG	4.6 km	MPC · JPL
155243	2005 WW_{25}	—	November 21, 2005	Kitt Peak	Spacewatch	·	3.2 km	MPC · JPL
155244	2005 WH_{29}	—	November 21, 2005	Kitt Peak	Spacewatch	·	2.6 km	MPC · JPL
155245	2005 WJ_{38}	—	November 22, 2005	Kitt Peak	Spacewatch	·	4.2 km	MPC · JPL
155246	2005 WE_{44}	—	November 21, 2005	Kitt Peak	Spacewatch	·	2.2 km	MPC · JPL
155247	2005 WK_{46}	—	November 22, 2005	Junk Bond	D. Healy	·	2.5 km	MPC · JPL
155248	2005 WN_{46}	—	November 24, 2005	Palomar	NEAT	·	5.5 km	MPC · JPL
155249	2005 WU_{48}	—	November 25, 2005	Kitt Peak	Spacewatch	·	2.4 km	MPC · JPL
155250	2005 WW_{57}	—	November 25, 2005	Catalina	CSS	(5)	1.9 km	MPC · JPL
155251	2005 WC_{59}	—	November 29, 2005	Socorro	LINEAR	·	3.5 km	MPC · JPL
155252	2005 WU_{60}	—	November 25, 2005	Mount Lemmon	Mount Lemmon Survey	·	1.2 km	MPC · JPL
155253	2005 WX_{66}	—	November 22, 2005	Kitt Peak	Spacewatch	KOR	1.7 km	MPC · JPL
155254	2005 WB_{68}	—	November 22, 2005	Kitt Peak	Spacewatch	KOR	2.0 km	MPC · JPL
155255	2005 WO_{73}	—	November 25, 2005	Catalina	CSS	JUN	2.0 km	MPC · JPL
155256	2005 WH_{76}	—	November 25, 2005	Kitt Peak	Spacewatch	NYS	1.8 km	MPC · JPL
155257	2005 WL_{81}	—	November 26, 2005	Mount Lemmon	Mount Lemmon Survey	·	2.6 km	MPC · JPL
155258	2005 WP_{86}	—	November 28, 2005	Mount Lemmon	Mount Lemmon Survey	(2076)	2.3 km	MPC · JPL
155259	2005 WQ_{86}	—	November 28, 2005	Mount Lemmon	Mount Lemmon Survey	·	2.1 km	MPC · JPL
155260	2005 WH_{89}	—	November 25, 2005	Mount Lemmon	Mount Lemmon Survey	AGN	1.8 km	MPC · JPL
155261	2005 WE_{95}	—	November 26, 2005	Kitt Peak	Spacewatch	·	1.5 km	MPC · JPL
155262	2005 WL_{95}	—	November 26, 2005	Kitt Peak	Spacewatch	·	5.6 km	MPC · JPL
155263	2005 WM_{98}	—	November 28, 2005	Kitt Peak	Spacewatch	·	1.6 km	MPC · JPL
155264	2005 WN_{99}	—	November 28, 2005	Mount Lemmon	Mount Lemmon Survey	·	5.0 km	MPC · JPL
155265	2005 WM_{103}	—	November 26, 2005	Catalina	CSS	·	2.8 km	MPC · JPL
155266	2005 WP_{105}	—	November 29, 2005	Kitt Peak	Spacewatch	·	3.8 km	MPC · JPL
155267	2005 WE_{106}	—	November 29, 2005	Socorro	LINEAR	KOR	2.2 km	MPC · JPL
155268	2005 WE_{108}	—	November 28, 2005	Catalina	CSS	WIT	1.5 km	MPC · JPL
155269	2005 WC_{113}	—	November 25, 2005	Catalina	CSS	·	2.8 km	MPC · JPL
155270 Dianawheeler	2005 WH_{113}	Dianawheeler	November 25, 2005	Catalina	CSS	·	3.4 km	MPC · JPL
155271	2005 WJ_{114}	—	November 28, 2005	Socorro	LINEAR	(5)	2.2 km	MPC · JPL
155272	2005 WT_{118}	—	November 25, 2005	Catalina	CSS	THM	3.9 km	MPC · JPL
155273	2005 WR_{119}	—	November 28, 2005	Catalina	CSS	·	2.3 km	MPC · JPL
155274	2005 WM_{146}	—	November 25, 2005	Kitt Peak	Spacewatch	·	2.3 km	MPC · JPL
155275	2005 WJ_{154}	—	November 29, 2005	Socorro	LINEAR	SUL	3.4 km	MPC · JPL
155276	2005 WV_{155}	—	November 29, 2005	Palomar	NEAT	V	890 m	MPC · JPL
155277	2005 WJ_{159}	—	November 29, 2005	Socorro	LINEAR	PAD	2.5 km	MPC · JPL
155278	2005 WR_{168}	—	November 30, 2005	Kitt Peak	Spacewatch	·	2.2 km	MPC · JPL
155279	2005 WW_{173}	—	November 30, 2005	Mount Lemmon	Mount Lemmon Survey	·	1.7 km	MPC · JPL
155280	2005 WR_{181}	—	November 25, 2005	Catalina	CSS	·	2.7 km	MPC · JPL
155281	2005 WX_{184}	—	November 29, 2005	Socorro	LINEAR	·	1.8 km	MPC · JPL
155282	2005 WC_{186}	—	November 30, 2005	Socorro	LINEAR	·	4.2 km	MPC · JPL
155283	2005 WS_{187}	—	November 29, 2005	Catalina	CSS	·	3.4 km	MPC · JPL
155284	2005 WC_{190}	—	November 20, 2005	Catalina	CSS	MAR	2.2 km	MPC · JPL
155285	2005 WH_{191}	—	November 21, 2005	Catalina	CSS	·	2.2 km	MPC · JPL
155286	2005 WU_{192}	—	November 26, 2005	Socorro	LINEAR	PHO	2.1 km	MPC · JPL
155287	2005 XK_{1}	—	December 4, 2005	Socorro	LINEAR	·	1.6 km	MPC · JPL
155288	2005 XY_{5}	—	December 1, 2005	Socorro	LINEAR	·	4.8 km	MPC · JPL
155289	2005 XE_{26}	—	December 4, 2005	Socorro	LINEAR	·	3.2 km	MPC · JPL
155290 Anniegrauer	2005 XJ_{40}	Anniegrauer	December 5, 2005	Mount Lemmon	Mount Lemmon Survey	·	7.0 km	MPC · JPL
155291	2005 XO_{56}	—	December 5, 2005	Mount Lemmon	Mount Lemmon Survey	KOR	2.0 km	MPC · JPL
155292	2005 XT_{64}	—	December 7, 2005	Socorro	LINEAR	·	2.3 km	MPC · JPL
155293	2005 XO_{65}	—	December 2, 2005	Catalina	CSS	·	2.8 km	MPC · JPL
155294	2005 XY_{65}	—	December 7, 2005	Catalina	CSS	·	4.0 km	MPC · JPL
155295	2005 XN_{77}	—	December 8, 2005	Kitt Peak	Spacewatch	MAR	1.9 km	MPC · JPL
155296	2005 YJ	—	December 20, 2005	Socorro	LINEAR	EUP	6.9 km	MPC · JPL
155297	2005 YS_{9}	—	December 21, 2005	Kitt Peak	Spacewatch	·	2.0 km	MPC · JPL
155298	2005 YG_{19}	—	December 24, 2005	Kitt Peak	Spacewatch	·	1.7 km	MPC · JPL
155299	2005 YD_{25}	—	December 24, 2005	Kitt Peak	Spacewatch	THM	3.6 km	MPC · JPL
155300	2005 YG_{40}	—	December 22, 2005	Kitt Peak	Spacewatch	THM · fast	4.4 km	MPC · JPL

== 155301–155400 ==
back to top

Designation			Discovery			Properties		Ref
Permanent	Provisional	Named after	Date	Site	Discoverer(s)	Category	Diam.	Ref
155301	2005 YU_{43}	—	December 25, 2005	Kitt Peak	Spacewatch	·	2.4 km	MPC · JPL
155302	2005 YS_{46}	—	December 25, 2005	Kitt Peak	Spacewatch	SYL · CYB	7.9 km	MPC · JPL
155303	2005 YU_{53}	—	December 22, 2005	Kitt Peak	Spacewatch	AEO	1.9 km	MPC · JPL
155304	2005 YE_{57}	—	December 24, 2005	Kitt Peak	Spacewatch	·	1.5 km	MPC · JPL
155305	2005 YU_{73}	—	December 24, 2005	Kitt Peak	Spacewatch	CYB	5.0 km	MPC · JPL
155306	2005 YA_{75}	—	December 24, 2005	Palomar	NEAT	EUN	2.1 km	MPC · JPL
155307	2005 YB_{133}	—	December 26, 2005	Kitt Peak	Spacewatch	·	3.0 km	MPC · JPL
155308	2005 YA_{137}	—	December 26, 2005	Mount Lemmon	Mount Lemmon Survey	·	3.7 km	MPC · JPL
155309	2005 YS_{141}	—	December 28, 2005	Mount Lemmon	Mount Lemmon Survey	·	3.0 km	MPC · JPL
155310	2005 YF_{156}	—	December 26, 2005	Mount Lemmon	Mount Lemmon Survey	·	2.8 km	MPC · JPL
155311	2005 YW_{159}	—	December 27, 2005	Kitt Peak	Spacewatch	AGN	1.8 km	MPC · JPL
155312	2005 YC_{168}	—	December 28, 2005	Kitt Peak	Spacewatch	HYG	4.3 km	MPC · JPL
155313	2005 YZ_{170}	—	December 29, 2005	Kitt Peak	Spacewatch	·	2.6 km	MPC · JPL
155314	2005 YW_{206}	—	December 27, 2005	Kitt Peak	Spacewatch	·	4.0 km	MPC · JPL
155315	2005 YM_{219}	—	December 31, 2005	Socorro	LINEAR	·	2.6 km	MPC · JPL
155316	2005 YP_{275}	—	December 21, 2005	Kitt Peak	Spacewatch	THM	3.2 km	MPC · JPL
155317	2005 YU_{283}	—	December 28, 2005	Mount Lemmon	Mount Lemmon Survey	·	1.2 km	MPC · JPL
155318	2006 AP_{18}	—	January 5, 2006	Anderson Mesa	LONEOS	EOS	3.7 km	MPC · JPL
155319	2006 AC_{31}	—	January 5, 2006	Kitt Peak	Spacewatch	·	3.4 km	MPC · JPL
155320	2006 AC_{32}	—	January 5, 2006	Socorro	LINEAR	KOR	2.5 km	MPC · JPL
155321	2006 AA_{55}	—	January 5, 2006	Kitt Peak	Spacewatch	·	4.1 km	MPC · JPL
155322	2006 AR_{56}	—	January 7, 2006	Mount Lemmon	Mount Lemmon Survey	THM	4.0 km	MPC · JPL
155323	2006 AD_{70}	—	January 6, 2006	Kitt Peak	Spacewatch	KOR	2.0 km	MPC · JPL
155324	2006 AY_{81}	—	January 5, 2006	Socorro	LINEAR	·	3.0 km	MPC · JPL
155325	2006 AG_{86}	—	January 2, 2006	Socorro	LINEAR	MAR	3.3 km	MPC · JPL
155326	2006 AN_{97}	—	January 6, 2006	Socorro	LINEAR	L5	20 km	MPC · JPL
155327	2006 AV_{99}	—	January 6, 2006	Mount Lemmon	Mount Lemmon Survey	L5	10 km	MPC · JPL
155328	2006 BG_{13}	—	January 22, 2006	Mount Lemmon	Mount Lemmon Survey	·	2.3 km	MPC · JPL
155329	2006 BJ_{43}	—	January 23, 2006	Kitt Peak	Spacewatch	·	2.9 km	MPC · JPL
155330	2006 BN_{61}	—	January 22, 2006	Catalina	CSS	·	5.8 km	MPC · JPL
155331	2006 BD_{104}	—	January 24, 2006	Kitt Peak	Spacewatch	·	9.1 km	MPC · JPL
155332	2006 BA_{157}	—	January 25, 2006	Kitt Peak	Spacewatch	L5	12 km	MPC · JPL
155333	2006 BK_{196}	—	January 30, 2006	Kitt Peak	Spacewatch	·	4.9 km	MPC · JPL
155334	2006 DZ_{169}	—	February 27, 2006	Kitt Peak	Spacewatch	AMO +1km	1.3 km	MPC · JPL
155335	2006 EV	—	March 4, 2006	Mount Lemmon	Mount Lemmon Survey	T_{j} (2.99) · EUP	7.9 km	MPC · JPL
155336	2006 GA_{1}	—	April 2, 2006	Kitt Peak	Spacewatch	APO	740 m	MPC · JPL
155337	2006 KH_{89}	—	May 29, 2006	Mount Lemmon	Mount Lemmon Survey	L5	17 km	MPC · JPL
155338	2006 MZ_{1}	—	June 20, 2006	Catalina	CSS	APO · PHA · critical	300 m	MPC · JPL
155339	2006 RD_{83}	—	September 15, 2006	Kitt Peak	Spacewatch	·	1.4 km	MPC · JPL
155340	2006 SK_{198}	—	September 28, 2006	Catalina	CSS	AMO +1km	2.0 km	MPC · JPL
155341	2006 SA_{218}	—	September 30, 2006	Siding Spring	SSS	AMO +1km	800 m	MPC · JPL
155342	2006 XD_{40}	—	December 12, 2006	Mount Lemmon	Mount Lemmon Survey	·	3.3 km	MPC · JPL
155343	2006 YU_{6}	—	December 20, 2006	Palomar	NEAT	·	3.1 km	MPC · JPL
155344	2007 AP_{14}	—	January 9, 2007	Kitt Peak	Spacewatch	NYS	1.9 km	MPC · JPL
155345	2007 AR_{14}	—	January 9, 2007	Mount Lemmon	Mount Lemmon Survey	·	1.5 km	MPC · JPL
155346	2007 AH_{23}	—	January 10, 2007	Mount Lemmon	Mount Lemmon Survey	·	1.5 km	MPC · JPL
155347	2007 BU_{31}	—	January 23, 2007	Anderson Mesa	LONEOS	·	2.5 km	MPC · JPL
155348	2007 BE_{44}	—	January 24, 2007	Catalina	CSS	MAS	1.3 km	MPC · JPL
155349	2007 CL_{17}	—	February 8, 2007	Mount Lemmon	Mount Lemmon Survey	NYS	1.7 km	MPC · JPL
155350	2007 CN_{21}	—	February 6, 2007	Palomar	NEAT	MAR	1.9 km	MPC · JPL
155351	2007 CY_{24}	—	February 8, 2007	Catalina	CSS	·	3.1 km	MPC · JPL
155352	2007 CA_{25}	—	February 8, 2007	Catalina	CSS	·	3.0 km	MPC · JPL
155353	2007 CM_{25}	—	February 8, 2007	Kitt Peak	Spacewatch	NYS	1.9 km	MPC · JPL
155354	2007 CE_{27}	—	February 9, 2007	Kitt Peak	Spacewatch	TIR	4.3 km	MPC · JPL
155355	2007 DU_{2}	—	February 16, 2007	Catalina	CSS	MAS	1.1 km	MPC · JPL
155356	2707 P-L	—	September 24, 1960	Palomar	C. J. van Houten, I. van Houten-Groeneveld, T. Gehrels	·	2.6 km	MPC · JPL
155357	6096 P-L	—	September 24, 1960	Palomar	C. J. van Houten, I. van Houten-Groeneveld, T. Gehrels	ADE	3.9 km	MPC · JPL
155358	6231 P-L	—	September 24, 1960	Palomar	C. J. van Houten, I. van Houten-Groeneveld, T. Gehrels	·	5.1 km	MPC · JPL
155359	6292 P-L	—	September 24, 1960	Palomar	C. J. van Houten, I. van Houten-Groeneveld, T. Gehrels	·	1.7 km	MPC · JPL
155360	1031 T-2	—	September 29, 1973	Palomar	C. J. van Houten, I. van Houten-Groeneveld, T. Gehrels	·	1.4 km	MPC · JPL
155361	1096 T-2	—	September 29, 1973	Palomar	C. J. van Houten, I. van Houten-Groeneveld, T. Gehrels	EOS	6.9 km	MPC · JPL
155362	3127 T-3	—	October 16, 1977	Palomar	C. J. van Houten, I. van Houten-Groeneveld, T. Gehrels	·	1.4 km	MPC · JPL
155363	3207 T-3	—	October 16, 1977	Palomar	C. J. van Houten, I. van Houten-Groeneveld, T. Gehrels	·	3.0 km	MPC · JPL
155364	3402 T-3	—	October 16, 1977	Palomar	C. J. van Houten, I. van Houten-Groeneveld, T. Gehrels	·	2.7 km	MPC · JPL
155365	4308 T-3	—	October 16, 1977	Palomar	C. J. van Houten, I. van Houten-Groeneveld, T. Gehrels	NEM	3.2 km	MPC · JPL
155366	4557 T-3	—	October 16, 1977	Palomar	C. J. van Houten, I. van Houten-Groeneveld, T. Gehrels	·	1.8 km	MPC · JPL
155367	5095 T-3	—	October 16, 1977	Palomar	C. J. van Houten, I. van Houten-Groeneveld, T. Gehrels	·	3.9 km	MPC · JPL
155368	5120 T-3	—	October 16, 1977	Palomar	C. J. van Houten, I. van Houten-Groeneveld, T. Gehrels	T_{j} (2.97)	7.6 km	MPC · JPL
155369	1981 EH_{15}	—	March 1, 1981	Siding Spring	S. J. Bus	·	1.4 km	MPC · JPL
155370	1988 TX	—	October 13, 1988	Kushiro	S. Ueda, H. Kaneda	·	1.4 km	MPC · JPL
155371	1990 SB_{8}	—	September 22, 1990	La Silla	E. W. Elst	NYS	1.5 km	MPC · JPL
155372	1991 TM_{15}	—	October 6, 1991	Palomar	Lowe, A.	·	3.7 km	MPC · JPL
155373	1991 TV_{16}	—	October 7, 1991	Palomar	Lowe, A.	·	2.2 km	MPC · JPL
155374	1991 VZ_{10}	—	November 5, 1991	Kitt Peak	Spacewatch	·	4.1 km	MPC · JPL
155375	1992 DP_{3}	—	February 26, 1992	Kitt Peak	Spacewatch	MAS	930 m	MPC · JPL
155376	1992 RL_{5}	—	September 2, 1992	La Silla	E. W. Elst	(5)	2.9 km	MPC · JPL
155377	1992 SW_{9}	—	September 27, 1992	Kitt Peak	Spacewatch	·	2.7 km	MPC · JPL
155378	1993 FF_{9}	—	March 17, 1993	La Silla	UESAC	·	2.0 km	MPC · JPL
155379	1993 FP_{50}	—	March 19, 1993	La Silla	UESAC	·	1.1 km	MPC · JPL
155380	1993 FU_{56}	—	March 17, 1993	La Silla	UESAC	·	1.2 km	MPC · JPL
155381	1993 FY_{64}	—	March 21, 1993	La Silla	UESAC	HOF	4.1 km	MPC · JPL
155382	1993 TZ_{15}	—	October 9, 1993	La Silla	E. W. Elst	·	3.6 km	MPC · JPL
155383	1993 TC_{18}	—	October 9, 1993	La Silla	E. W. Elst	·	1.8 km	MPC · JPL
155384	1993 TZ_{19}	—	October 9, 1993	La Silla	E. W. Elst	NYS	2.3 km	MPC · JPL
155385	1993 UO_{6}	—	October 20, 1993	La Silla	E. W. Elst	·	1.8 km	MPC · JPL
155386	1994 AF_{6}	—	January 7, 1994	Kitt Peak	Spacewatch	·	1.7 km	MPC · JPL
155387	1994 AC_{9}	—	January 8, 1994	Kitt Peak	Spacewatch	THM	3.7 km	MPC · JPL
155388	1994 AR_{10}	—	January 8, 1994	Kitt Peak	Spacewatch	·	1.9 km	MPC · JPL
155389	1994 CY_{3}	—	February 10, 1994	Kitt Peak	Spacewatch	EUN	2.0 km	MPC · JPL
155390	1994 PP_{29}	—	August 12, 1994	La Silla	E. W. Elst	·	1.2 km	MPC · JPL
155391	1994 PG_{30}	—	August 12, 1994	La Silla	E. W. Elst	·	1.4 km	MPC · JPL
155392	1994 SE_{3}	—	September 28, 1994	Kitt Peak	Spacewatch	KOR	1.3 km	MPC · JPL
155393	1995 BN_{5}	—	January 23, 1995	Kitt Peak	Spacewatch	NYS	1.4 km	MPC · JPL
155394	1995 CQ_{6}	—	February 1, 1995	Kitt Peak	Spacewatch	·	3.8 km	MPC · JPL
155395	1995 SA_{5}	—	September 25, 1995	Ondřejov	L. Kotková	BRA	2.3 km	MPC · JPL
155396	1995 SS_{14}	—	September 18, 1995	Kitt Peak	Spacewatch	·	2.4 km	MPC · JPL
155397	1995 SA_{19}	—	September 18, 1995	Kitt Peak	Spacewatch	·	2.3 km	MPC · JPL
155398	1995 SS_{31}	—	September 21, 1995	Kitt Peak	Spacewatch	·	2.5 km	MPC · JPL
155399	1995 SB_{47}	—	September 26, 1995	Kitt Peak	Spacewatch	V	1.1 km	MPC · JPL
155400	1995 UD_{1}	—	October 21, 1995	Kleť	Kleť	·	1.0 km	MPC · JPL

== 155401–155500 ==
back to top

Designation			Discovery			Properties		Ref
Permanent	Provisional	Named after	Date	Site	Discoverer(s)	Category	Diam.	Ref
155401	1995 UM_{14}	—	October 17, 1995	Kitt Peak	Spacewatch	·	2.8 km	MPC · JPL
155402	1995 UZ_{17}	—	October 18, 1995	Kitt Peak	Spacewatch	·	2.6 km	MPC · JPL
155403	1995 UC_{19}	—	October 19, 1995	Kitt Peak	Spacewatch	·	1.9 km	MPC · JPL
155404	1995 UX_{38}	—	October 22, 1995	Kitt Peak	Spacewatch	·	2.9 km	MPC · JPL
155405	1995 VH_{9}	—	November 14, 1995	Kitt Peak	Spacewatch	KOR	2.0 km	MPC · JPL
155406	1995 VS_{9}	—	November 15, 1995	Kitt Peak	Spacewatch	·	1.9 km	MPC · JPL
155407	1995 XB_{4}	—	December 14, 1995	Kitt Peak	Spacewatch	·	2.9 km	MPC · JPL
155408	1995 YF_{7}	—	December 16, 1995	Kitt Peak	Spacewatch	·	2.4 km	MPC · JPL
155409	1995 YN_{7}	—	December 16, 1995	Kitt Peak	Spacewatch	·	2.9 km	MPC · JPL
155410	1996 CE_{2}	—	February 15, 1996	Sormano	P. Sicoli, Ghezzi, P.	·	1.9 km	MPC · JPL
155411	1996 DG_{3}	—	February 28, 1996	Cloudcroft	W. Offutt	·	1.1 km	MPC · JPL
155412	1996 FO_{10}	—	March 20, 1996	Kitt Peak	Spacewatch	·	1.9 km	MPC · JPL
155413	1996 HS_{19}	—	April 18, 1996	La Silla	E. W. Elst	·	5.8 km	MPC · JPL
155414	1996 HQ_{24}	—	April 20, 1996	La Silla	E. W. Elst	·	1.8 km	MPC · JPL
155415	1996 JZ_{5}	—	May 11, 1996	Kitt Peak	Spacewatch	L5	11 km	MPC · JPL
155416	1996 KJ_{2}	—	May 17, 1996	Kitt Peak	Spacewatch	·	4.5 km	MPC · JPL
155417	1996 RC_{7}	—	September 5, 1996	Kitt Peak	Spacewatch	·	1.7 km	MPC · JPL
155418	1996 SQ_{2}	—	September 19, 1996	Kitt Peak	Spacewatch	·	1.4 km	MPC · JPL
155419	1996 TG_{34}	—	October 10, 1996	Kitt Peak	Spacewatch	·	1.6 km	MPC · JPL
155420	1996 VJ_{10}	—	November 4, 1996	Kitt Peak	Spacewatch	EUN	2.5 km	MPC · JPL
155421	1996 VT_{22}	—	November 9, 1996	Kitt Peak	Spacewatch	EUN	1.4 km	MPC · JPL
155422	1996 XR_{16}	—	December 4, 1996	Kitt Peak	Spacewatch	·	2.4 km	MPC · JPL
155423	1997 AZ_{19}	—	January 10, 1997	Kitt Peak	Spacewatch	·	2.3 km	MPC · JPL
155424	1997 BL_{5}	—	January 31, 1997	Kitt Peak	Spacewatch	·	3.2 km	MPC · JPL
155425	1997 ER_{6}	—	March 3, 1997	Kitt Peak	Spacewatch	·	3.3 km	MPC · JPL
155426	1997 GU_{13}	—	April 3, 1997	Socorro	LINEAR	·	1.0 km	MPC · JPL
155427	1997 LO_{5}	—	June 1, 1997	Kitt Peak	Spacewatch	L5	9.9 km	MPC · JPL
155428	1997 MU_{2}	—	June 28, 1997	Socorro	LINEAR	·	6.8 km	MPC · JPL
155429	1997 MB_{8}	—	June 29, 1997	Kitt Peak	Spacewatch	NYS ·	2.8 km	MPC · JPL
155430	1997 NS_{5}	—	July 7, 1997	Kitt Peak	Spacewatch	·	1.4 km	MPC · JPL
155431	1997 QL_{2}	—	August 30, 1997	Haleakala	NEAT	·	6.8 km	MPC · JPL
155432	1997 SS_{2}	—	September 25, 1997	Ondřejov	M. Wolf, P. Pravec	·	1.7 km	MPC · JPL
155433	1997 UQ_{4}	—	October 18, 1997	Xinglong	SCAP	·	2.5 km	MPC · JPL
155434	1997 VQ_{8}	—	November 3, 1997	Xinglong	SCAP	·	2.2 km	MPC · JPL
155435	1997 WN_{6}	—	November 23, 1997	Kitt Peak	Spacewatch	·	2.4 km	MPC · JPL
155436	1997 WZ_{24}	—	November 28, 1997	Kitt Peak	Spacewatch	V	1.0 km	MPC · JPL
155437	1998 DE	—	February 17, 1998	Bédoin	P. Antonini	·	2.9 km	MPC · JPL
155438 Velásquez	1998 DV	Velásquez	February 18, 1998	Kleť	Kleť	(5)	2.9 km	MPC · JPL
155439	1998 DF_{24}	—	February 21, 1998	Kitt Peak	Spacewatch	·	3.6 km	MPC · JPL
155440	1998 FN_{8}	—	March 21, 1998	Kitt Peak	Spacewatch	·	2.0 km	MPC · JPL
155441	1998 FP_{10}	—	March 24, 1998	Caussols	ODAS	·	3.5 km	MPC · JPL
155442	1998 HN_{9}	—	April 18, 1998	Kitt Peak	Spacewatch	GEF	2.0 km	MPC · JPL
155443	1998 HX_{14}	—	April 17, 1998	Kitt Peak	Spacewatch	·	2.4 km	MPC · JPL
155444	1998 HJ_{35}	—	April 20, 1998	Socorro	LINEAR	·	3.1 km	MPC · JPL
155445	1998 HL_{35}	—	April 20, 1998	Socorro	LINEAR	·	3.5 km	MPC · JPL
155446	1998 HK_{40}	—	April 20, 1998	Socorro	LINEAR	·	3.6 km	MPC · JPL
155447	1998 HN_{41}	—	April 19, 1998	Kitt Peak	Spacewatch	EUN	2.0 km	MPC · JPL
155448	1998 HB_{43}	—	April 24, 1998	Kitt Peak	Spacewatch	·	3.2 km	MPC · JPL
155449	1998 HV_{94}	—	April 21, 1998	Socorro	LINEAR	·	3.8 km	MPC · JPL
155450	1998 HT_{119}	—	April 23, 1998	Socorro	LINEAR	·	3.0 km	MPC · JPL
155451	1998 HV_{134}	—	April 19, 1998	Socorro	LINEAR	EUN	3.0 km	MPC · JPL
155452	1998 HN_{150}	—	April 20, 1998	Socorro	LINEAR	·	3.2 km	MPC · JPL
155453	1998 HS_{154}	—	April 19, 1998	Socorro	LINEAR	·	3.1 km	MPC · JPL
155454	1998 MU_{18}	—	June 19, 1998	Caussols	ODAS	·	4.8 km	MPC · JPL
155455	1998 ML_{24}	—	June 29, 1998	Kitt Peak	Spacewatch	·	1.4 km	MPC · JPL
155456	1998 QQ_{62}	—	August 27, 1998	Xinglong	SCAP	·	2.4 km	MPC · JPL
155457	1998 QK_{103}	—	August 26, 1998	La Silla	E. W. Elst	·	3.3 km	MPC · JPL
155458	1998 QL_{111}	—	August 17, 1998	Socorro	LINEAR	·	990 m	MPC · JPL
155459	1998 RS_{6}	—	September 12, 1998	Kitt Peak	Spacewatch	EOS	3.3 km	MPC · JPL
155460	1998 RB_{14}	—	September 14, 1998	Kitt Peak	Spacewatch	·	4.1 km	MPC · JPL
155461	1998 RV_{37}	—	September 14, 1998	Socorro	LINEAR	·	3.8 km	MPC · JPL
155462	1998 RG_{42}	—	September 14, 1998	Socorro	LINEAR	·	1.2 km	MPC · JPL
155463	1998 RM_{53}	—	September 14, 1998	Socorro	LINEAR	VER	5.0 km	MPC · JPL
155464	1998 RU_{70}	—	September 14, 1998	Socorro	LINEAR	·	1.3 km	MPC · JPL
155465	1998 RE_{79}	—	September 14, 1998	Socorro	LINEAR	·	5.7 km	MPC · JPL
155466	1998 SJ_{9}	—	September 17, 1998	Xinglong	SCAP	·	1.3 km	MPC · JPL
155467	1998 SO_{20}	—	September 21, 1998	Kitt Peak	Spacewatch	·	1.3 km	MPC · JPL
155468	1998 SM_{65}	—	September 20, 1998	La Silla	E. W. Elst	·	1.2 km	MPC · JPL
155469	1998 SB_{81}	—	September 26, 1998	Socorro	LINEAR	EOS	3.8 km	MPC · JPL
155470	1998 SH_{88}	—	September 26, 1998	Socorro	LINEAR	·	1.1 km	MPC · JPL
155471	1998 SC_{97}	—	September 26, 1998	Socorro	LINEAR	·	4.4 km	MPC · JPL
155472	1998 SY_{98}	—	September 26, 1998	Socorro	LINEAR	·	5.6 km	MPC · JPL
155473	1998 SW_{104}	—	September 26, 1998	Socorro	LINEAR	·	1.2 km	MPC · JPL
155474	1998 SO_{124}	—	September 26, 1998	Socorro	LINEAR	·	4.0 km	MPC · JPL
155475	1998 SP_{131}	—	September 26, 1998	Socorro	LINEAR	·	5.4 km	MPC · JPL
155476	1998 SX_{141}	—	September 26, 1998	Socorro	LINEAR	·	4.2 km	MPC · JPL
155477	1998 SG_{149}	—	September 26, 1998	Socorro	LINEAR	·	3.5 km	MPC · JPL
155478	1998 SY_{162}	—	September 26, 1998	Socorro	LINEAR	·	2.6 km	MPC · JPL
155479	1998 TG_{2}	—	October 13, 1998	Caussols	ODAS	·	1.4 km	MPC · JPL
155480	1998 TK_{2}	—	October 13, 1998	Caussols	ODAS	·	2.8 km	MPC · JPL
155481	1998 TJ_{25}	—	October 14, 1998	Kitt Peak	Spacewatch	·	1.4 km	MPC · JPL
155482	1998 TF_{38}	—	October 10, 1998	Anderson Mesa	LONEOS	·	6.3 km	MPC · JPL
155483	1998 UC_{27}	—	October 18, 1998	La Silla	E. W. Elst	·	5.0 km	MPC · JPL
155484	1998 US_{34}	—	October 28, 1998	Socorro	LINEAR	·	5.5 km	MPC · JPL
155485	1998 VY_{11}	—	November 10, 1998	Socorro	LINEAR	·	1.4 km	MPC · JPL
155486	1998 VT_{56}	—	November 11, 1998	Anderson Mesa	LONEOS	·	1.8 km	MPC · JPL
155487	1998 WP_{8}	—	November 27, 1998	Cocoa	I. P. Griffin	·	1.6 km	MPC · JPL
155488	1998 WJ_{35}	—	November 18, 1998	Kitt Peak	Spacewatch	·	4.1 km	MPC · JPL
155489	1998 XA_{8}	—	December 9, 1998	Kitt Peak	Spacewatch	THM	3.6 km	MPC · JPL
155490	1998 XF_{27}	—	December 15, 1998	Socorro	LINEAR	PHO	2.2 km	MPC · JPL
155491	1998 YR_{7}	—	December 24, 1998	Catalina	CSS	H	1.1 km	MPC · JPL
155492	1999 AD_{15}	—	January 8, 1999	Kitt Peak	Spacewatch	·	1.7 km	MPC · JPL
155493	1999 BZ_{26}	—	January 16, 1999	Kitt Peak	Spacewatch	NYS ·	4.0 km	MPC · JPL
155494	1999 CY_{16}	—	February 10, 1999	Socorro	LINEAR	·	3.8 km	MPC · JPL
155495	1999 CW_{33}	—	February 10, 1999	Socorro	LINEAR	·	1.6 km	MPC · JPL
155496	1999 CF_{34}	—	February 10, 1999	Socorro	LINEAR	·	2.6 km	MPC · JPL
155497	1999 CL_{91}	—	February 10, 1999	Socorro	LINEAR	·	1.4 km	MPC · JPL
155498	1999 CO_{102}	—	February 12, 1999	Socorro	LINEAR	·	2.2 km	MPC · JPL
155499	1999 EU_{6}	—	March 14, 1999	Kitt Peak	Spacewatch	MAS	840 m	MPC · JPL
155500	1999 EN_{12}	—	March 15, 1999	Socorro	LINEAR	·	3.1 km	MPC · JPL

== 155501–155600 ==
back to top

Designation			Discovery			Properties		Ref
Permanent	Provisional	Named after	Date	Site	Discoverer(s)	Category	Diam.	Ref
155501	1999 JX_{96}	—	May 12, 1999	Socorro	LINEAR	·	4.7 km	MPC · JPL
155502	1999 JP_{97}	—	May 12, 1999	Socorro	LINEAR	·	3.0 km	MPC · JPL
155503	1999 LP_{5}	—	June 11, 1999	Socorro	LINEAR	H	810 m	MPC · JPL
155504	1999 LC_{7}	—	June 9, 1999	Kitt Peak	Spacewatch	EUN	2.1 km	MPC · JPL
155505	1999 NR_{32}	—	July 14, 1999	Socorro	LINEAR	EUN	2.6 km	MPC · JPL
155506	1999 NM_{40}	—	July 14, 1999	Socorro	LINEAR	·	3.1 km	MPC · JPL
155507	1999 RE_{5}	—	September 3, 1999	Kitt Peak	Spacewatch	·	2.4 km	MPC · JPL
155508	1999 RF_{22}	—	September 7, 1999	Socorro	LINEAR	·	2.5 km	MPC · JPL
155509	1999 RP_{73}	—	September 7, 1999	Socorro	LINEAR	·	3.4 km	MPC · JPL
155510	1999 RR_{73}	—	September 7, 1999	Socorro	LINEAR	EOS	2.8 km	MPC · JPL
155511	1999 RU_{143}	—	September 9, 1999	Socorro	LINEAR	·	2.9 km	MPC · JPL
155512	1999 RH_{162}	—	September 9, 1999	Socorro	LINEAR	·	3.7 km	MPC · JPL
155513	1999 RB_{172}	—	September 9, 1999	Socorro	LINEAR	·	3.4 km	MPC · JPL
155514	1999 RT_{172}	—	September 9, 1999	Socorro	LINEAR	·	4.3 km	MPC · JPL
155515	1999 RZ_{190}	—	September 10, 1999	Socorro	LINEAR	·	2.6 km	MPC · JPL
155516	1999 RG_{204}	—	September 8, 1999	Socorro	LINEAR	·	5.2 km	MPC · JPL
155517	1999 RH_{213}	—	September 12, 1999	Bergisch Gladbach	W. Bickel	KOR	1.6 km	MPC · JPL
155518	1999 RS_{217}	—	September 3, 1999	Kitt Peak	Spacewatch	·	2.5 km	MPC · JPL
155519	1999 RS_{251}	—	September 8, 1999	Kitt Peak	Spacewatch	·	3.3 km	MPC · JPL
155520	1999 TH_{10}	—	October 8, 1999	Prescott	P. G. Comba	·	7.7 km	MPC · JPL
155521	1999 TM_{26}	—	October 3, 1999	Socorro	LINEAR	·	1.2 km	MPC · JPL
155522	1999 TF_{28}	—	October 3, 1999	Socorro	LINEAR	·	4.1 km	MPC · JPL
155523	1999 TJ_{36}	—	October 11, 1999	Anderson Mesa	LONEOS	·	4.4 km	MPC · JPL
155524	1999 TL_{57}	—	October 6, 1999	Kitt Peak	Spacewatch	·	3.0 km	MPC · JPL
155525	1999 TR_{61}	—	October 7, 1999	Kitt Peak	Spacewatch	·	2.7 km	MPC · JPL
155526	1999 TV_{64}	—	October 8, 1999	Kitt Peak	Spacewatch	·	2.3 km	MPC · JPL
155527	1999 TU_{72}	—	October 9, 1999	Kitt Peak	Spacewatch	KOR	2.0 km	MPC · JPL
155528	1999 TX_{85}	—	October 14, 1999	Kitt Peak	Spacewatch	EOS	3.0 km	MPC · JPL
155529	1999 TZ_{119}	—	October 4, 1999	Socorro	LINEAR	·	6.6 km	MPC · JPL
155530	1999 TS_{121}	—	October 15, 1999	Socorro	LINEAR	TEL	2.1 km	MPC · JPL
155531	1999 TB_{129}	—	October 6, 1999	Socorro	LINEAR	KOR	2.2 km	MPC · JPL
155532	1999 TR_{133}	—	October 6, 1999	Socorro	LINEAR	·	3.0 km	MPC · JPL
155533	1999 TU_{135}	—	October 6, 1999	Socorro	LINEAR	EOS	2.5 km	MPC · JPL
155534	1999 TY_{145}	—	October 7, 1999	Socorro	LINEAR	·	3.7 km	MPC · JPL
155535	1999 TR_{177}	—	October 10, 1999	Socorro	LINEAR	·	2.9 km	MPC · JPL
155536	1999 TO_{196}	—	October 12, 1999	Socorro	LINEAR	LIX	4.8 km	MPC · JPL
155537	1999 TL_{204}	—	October 13, 1999	Socorro	LINEAR	·	4.1 km	MPC · JPL
155538	1999 TC_{207}	—	October 14, 1999	Socorro	LINEAR	PHO	1.8 km	MPC · JPL
155539	1999 TU_{221}	—	October 1, 1999	Catalina	CSS	JUN	1.7 km	MPC · JPL
155540	1999 TN_{224}	—	October 1, 1999	Catalina	CSS	KOR	2.0 km	MPC · JPL
155541	1999 TJ_{250}	—	October 9, 1999	Catalina	CSS	GEF	2.4 km	MPC · JPL
155542	1999 TE_{260}	—	October 10, 1999	Kitt Peak	Spacewatch	KOR	2.3 km	MPC · JPL
155543	1999 TC_{264}	—	October 15, 1999	Kitt Peak	Spacewatch	·	2.5 km	MPC · JPL
155544	1999 TX_{284}	—	October 9, 1999	Socorro	LINEAR	·	3.9 km	MPC · JPL
155545	1999 TH_{306}	—	October 6, 1999	Socorro	LINEAR	·	1.9 km	MPC · JPL
155546	1999 TP_{310}	—	October 4, 1999	Kitt Peak	Spacewatch	·	2.4 km	MPC · JPL
155547	1999 UZ_{14}	—	October 29, 1999	Catalina	CSS	·	3.9 km	MPC · JPL
155548	1999 UU_{21}	—	October 31, 1999	Kitt Peak	Spacewatch	KOR	1.6 km	MPC · JPL
155549	1999 UC_{29}	—	October 31, 1999	Kitt Peak	Spacewatch	·	2.2 km	MPC · JPL
155550	1999 UK_{31}	—	October 31, 1999	Kitt Peak	Spacewatch	·	3.0 km	MPC · JPL
155551	1999 UL_{47}	—	October 29, 1999	Catalina	CSS	·	3.5 km	MPC · JPL
155552	1999 UA_{48}	—	October 30, 1999	Catalina	CSS	·	3.6 km	MPC · JPL
155553	1999 UY_{56}	—	October 29, 1999	Kitt Peak	Spacewatch	EOS	2.3 km	MPC · JPL
155554	1999 VW_{57}	—	November 4, 1999	Socorro	LINEAR	·	5.4 km	MPC · JPL
155555	1999 VM_{59}	—	November 4, 1999	Socorro	LINEAR	·	4.3 km	MPC · JPL
155556	1999 VP_{80}	—	November 4, 1999	Socorro	LINEAR	·	5.7 km	MPC · JPL
155557	1999 VW_{96}	—	November 9, 1999	Socorro	LINEAR	·	4.2 km	MPC · JPL
155558	1999 VO_{127}	—	November 9, 1999	Kitt Peak	Spacewatch	·	2.5 km	MPC · JPL
155559	1999 VB_{147}	—	November 12, 1999	Socorro	LINEAR	THM	3.0 km	MPC · JPL
155560	1999 VD_{159}	—	November 14, 1999	Socorro	LINEAR	·	4.7 km	MPC · JPL
155561	1999 VL_{161}	—	November 14, 1999	Socorro	LINEAR	·	5.6 km	MPC · JPL
155562	1999 VD_{183}	—	November 9, 1999	Socorro	LINEAR	·	4.1 km	MPC · JPL
155563	1999 VR_{197}	—	November 3, 1999	Catalina	CSS	EOS	4.5 km	MPC · JPL
155564	1999 VD_{204}	—	November 5, 1999	Socorro	LINEAR	·	4.7 km	MPC · JPL
155565	1999 VX_{209}	—	November 12, 1999	Socorro	LINEAR	·	2.9 km	MPC · JPL
155566	1999 VY_{209}	—	November 12, 1999	Socorro	LINEAR	THM	2.9 km	MPC · JPL
155567	1999 WX_{15}	—	November 29, 1999	Kitt Peak	Spacewatch	·	2.8 km	MPC · JPL
155568	1999 WN_{17}	—	November 30, 1999	Kitt Peak	Spacewatch	·	3.6 km	MPC · JPL
155569	1999 WU_{17}	—	November 30, 1999	Kitt Peak	Spacewatch	GEF	2.1 km	MPC · JPL
155570	1999 WE_{24}	—	November 28, 1999	Kitt Peak	Spacewatch	·	4.6 km	MPC · JPL
155571	1999 XC_{29}	—	December 6, 1999	Socorro	LINEAR	·	5.8 km	MPC · JPL
155572	1999 XX_{47}	—	December 7, 1999	Socorro	LINEAR	EOS	3.1 km	MPC · JPL
155573	1999 XG_{66}	—	December 7, 1999	Socorro	LINEAR	HYG	4.2 km	MPC · JPL
155574	1999 XX_{73}	—	December 7, 1999	Socorro	LINEAR	·	4.5 km	MPC · JPL
155575	1999 XL_{78}	—	December 7, 1999	Socorro	LINEAR	·	6.7 km	MPC · JPL
155576	1999 XY_{128}	—	December 12, 1999	Socorro	LINEAR	·	1.1 km	MPC · JPL
155577	1999 XT_{135}	—	December 8, 1999	Socorro	LINEAR	·	1.6 km	MPC · JPL
155578	1999 XE_{145}	—	December 7, 1999	Kitt Peak	Spacewatch	EOS	3.5 km	MPC · JPL
155579	1999 XG_{219}	—	December 15, 1999	Kitt Peak	Spacewatch	THM	3.7 km	MPC · JPL
155580	1999 XE_{232}	—	December 4, 1999	Catalina	CSS	·	3.7 km	MPC · JPL
155581	1999 YN_{2}	—	December 16, 1999	Kitt Peak	Spacewatch	·	1.1 km	MPC · JPL
155582	1999 YN_{15}	—	December 31, 1999	Kitt Peak	Spacewatch	·	3.5 km	MPC · JPL
155583	2000 AY_{148}	—	January 7, 2000	Socorro	LINEAR	·	8.2 km	MPC · JPL
155584	2000 AF_{157}	—	January 3, 2000	Socorro	LINEAR	·	1.7 km	MPC · JPL
155585	2000 AJ_{166}	—	January 8, 2000	Socorro	LINEAR	·	5.5 km	MPC · JPL
155586	2000 AU_{182}	—	January 7, 2000	Socorro	LINEAR	·	1.4 km	MPC · JPL
155587	2000 AN_{205}	—	January 15, 2000	Prescott	P. G. Comba	·	1.3 km	MPC · JPL
155588	2000 AQ_{209}	—	January 5, 2000	Kitt Peak	Spacewatch	EOS	3.4 km	MPC · JPL
155589	2000 AJ_{249}	—	January 3, 2000	Kitt Peak	Spacewatch	·	7.4 km	MPC · JPL
155590	2000 BZ_{9}	—	January 26, 2000	Kitt Peak	Spacewatch	·	960 m	MPC · JPL
155591	2000 BK_{34}	—	January 30, 2000	Catalina	CSS	·	1.1 km	MPC · JPL
155592	2000 CK	—	February 2, 2000	Prescott	P. G. Comba	·	1.1 km	MPC · JPL
155593	2000 CK_{15}	—	February 2, 2000	Socorro	LINEAR	·	5.4 km	MPC · JPL
155594	2000 CP_{22}	—	February 2, 2000	Socorro	LINEAR	·	1.3 km	MPC · JPL
155595	2000 CL_{31}	—	February 2, 2000	Socorro	LINEAR	·	1.4 km	MPC · JPL
155596	2000 CB_{42}	—	February 2, 2000	Socorro	LINEAR	·	1.2 km	MPC · JPL
155597	2000 CE_{61}	—	February 2, 2000	Socorro	LINEAR	·	2.0 km	MPC · JPL
155598	2000 CR_{69}	—	February 1, 2000	Kitt Peak	Spacewatch	·	3.6 km	MPC · JPL
155599	2000 CL_{74}	—	February 8, 2000	Kitt Peak	Spacewatch	·	6.3 km	MPC · JPL
155600	2000 CC_{81}	—	February 4, 2000	Socorro	LINEAR	·	1.1 km	MPC · JPL

== 155601–155700 ==
back to top

Designation			Discovery			Properties		Ref
Permanent	Provisional	Named after	Date	Site	Discoverer(s)	Category	Diam.	Ref
155601	2000 CY_{97}	—	February 7, 2000	Kitt Peak	Spacewatch	·	1.4 km	MPC · JPL
155602	2000 CS_{111}	—	February 6, 2000	Catalina	CSS	·	1.3 km	MPC · JPL
155603	2000 CB_{138}	—	February 4, 2000	Kitt Peak	Spacewatch	·	1.0 km	MPC · JPL
155604	2000 DP_{20}	—	February 29, 2000	Socorro	LINEAR	·	1.6 km	MPC · JPL
155605	2000 DO_{40}	—	February 29, 2000	Socorro	LINEAR	(883)	1.2 km	MPC · JPL
155606	2000 DW_{44}	—	February 29, 2000	Socorro	LINEAR	·	1.7 km	MPC · JPL
155607	2000 DG_{55}	—	February 29, 2000	Socorro	LINEAR	·	3.4 km	MPC · JPL
155608	2000 DN_{75}	—	February 29, 2000	Socorro	LINEAR	·	1.7 km	MPC · JPL
155609	2000 DJ_{83}	—	February 28, 2000	Socorro	LINEAR	·	1.6 km	MPC · JPL
155610	2000 DQ_{87}	—	February 29, 2000	Socorro	LINEAR	·	1.1 km	MPC · JPL
155611	2000 DA_{107}	—	February 29, 2000	Socorro	LINEAR	·	1.4 km	MPC · JPL
155612	2000 DW_{109}	—	February 29, 2000	Socorro	LINEAR	·	1.8 km	MPC · JPL
155613	2000 EW_{13}	—	March 5, 2000	Socorro	LINEAR	·	1.5 km	MPC · JPL
155614	2000 EO_{23}	—	March 8, 2000	Kitt Peak	Spacewatch	·	1.2 km	MPC · JPL
155615	2000 ED_{60}	—	March 10, 2000	Socorro	LINEAR	·	1.1 km	MPC · JPL
155616	2000 EU_{66}	—	March 10, 2000	Socorro	LINEAR	·	1.1 km	MPC · JPL
155617	2000 EH_{68}	—	March 10, 2000	Socorro	LINEAR	·	1.4 km	MPC · JPL
155618	2000 EJ_{75}	—	March 9, 2000	Socorro	LINEAR	PHO	1.9 km	MPC · JPL
155619	2000 EF_{100}	—	March 12, 2000	Kitt Peak	Spacewatch	·	2.5 km	MPC · JPL
155620	2000 ER_{100}	—	March 12, 2000	Kitt Peak	Spacewatch	·	1.1 km	MPC · JPL
155621	2000 EV_{101}	—	March 14, 2000	Kitt Peak	Spacewatch	·	950 m	MPC · JPL
155622	2000 EE_{145}	—	March 3, 2000	Catalina	CSS	·	1.7 km	MPC · JPL
155623	2000 EY_{149}	—	March 5, 2000	Socorro	LINEAR	(2076)	1.5 km	MPC · JPL
155624	2000 EO_{180}	—	March 4, 2000	Socorro	LINEAR	·	1.9 km	MPC · JPL
155625	2000 FO_{2}	—	March 26, 2000	Kitt Peak	Spacewatch	V	1.2 km	MPC · JPL
155626	2000 FX_{14}	—	March 29, 2000	Socorro	LINEAR	PHO	1.7 km	MPC · JPL
155627	2000 FY_{17}	—	March 29, 2000	Socorro	LINEAR	·	3.1 km	MPC · JPL
155628	2000 FG_{29}	—	March 27, 2000	Anderson Mesa	LONEOS	V	1.3 km	MPC · JPL
155629	2000 FP_{40}	—	March 29, 2000	Socorro	LINEAR	·	3.9 km	MPC · JPL
155630	2000 FS_{46}	—	March 29, 2000	Socorro	LINEAR	BAP	1.5 km	MPC · JPL
155631	2000 FH_{72}	—	March 25, 2000	Kitt Peak	Spacewatch	·	1.1 km	MPC · JPL
155632	2000 FQ_{73}	—	March 25, 2000	Kitt Peak	Spacewatch	·	690 m	MPC · JPL
155633	2000 GE	—	April 1, 2000	Kitt Peak	Spacewatch	·	1.5 km	MPC · JPL
155634	2000 GJ_{2}	—	April 5, 2000	Prescott	P. G. Comba	·	1.3 km	MPC · JPL
155635	2000 GL_{4}	—	April 4, 2000	Socorro	LINEAR	PHO	2.4 km	MPC · JPL
155636	2000 GP_{10}	—	April 5, 2000	Socorro	LINEAR	·	1.1 km	MPC · JPL
155637	2000 GZ_{21}	—	April 5, 2000	Socorro	LINEAR	·	1.6 km	MPC · JPL
155638	2000 GD_{23}	—	April 5, 2000	Socorro	LINEAR	·	1.4 km	MPC · JPL
155639	2000 GU_{38}	—	April 5, 2000	Socorro	LINEAR	·	2.9 km	MPC · JPL
155640	2000 GJ_{39}	—	April 5, 2000	Socorro	LINEAR	·	1.1 km	MPC · JPL
155641	2000 GT_{40}	—	April 5, 2000	Socorro	LINEAR	·	1.1 km	MPC · JPL
155642	2000 GQ_{46}	—	April 5, 2000	Socorro	LINEAR	·	1.2 km	MPC · JPL
155643	2000 GZ_{47}	—	April 5, 2000	Socorro	LINEAR	·	1.1 km	MPC · JPL
155644	2000 GY_{48}	—	April 5, 2000	Socorro	LINEAR	MAS	1.1 km	MPC · JPL
155645	2000 GM_{52}	—	April 5, 2000	Socorro	LINEAR	fast	1.6 km	MPC · JPL
155646	2000 GT_{57}	—	April 5, 2000	Socorro	LINEAR	(2076)	1.5 km	MPC · JPL
155647	2000 GW_{63}	—	April 5, 2000	Socorro	LINEAR	·	1.3 km	MPC · JPL
155648	2000 GN_{80}	—	April 8, 2000	Socorro	LINEAR	·	1.4 km	MPC · JPL
155649	2000 GL_{88}	—	April 4, 2000	Socorro	LINEAR	·	3.0 km	MPC · JPL
155650	2000 GK_{92}	—	April 5, 2000	Socorro	LINEAR	·	1.8 km	MPC · JPL
155651	2000 GO_{98}	—	April 7, 2000	Socorro	LINEAR	·	1.6 km	MPC · JPL
155652	2000 GK_{131}	—	April 7, 2000	Kitt Peak	Spacewatch	NYS	960 m	MPC · JPL
155653	2000 GD_{132}	—	April 10, 2000	Kitt Peak	Spacewatch	·	1.5 km	MPC · JPL
155654	2000 GT_{143}	—	April 7, 2000	Anderson Mesa	LONEOS	PHO	2.2 km	MPC · JPL
155655	2000 GG_{144}	—	April 7, 2000	Kitt Peak	Spacewatch	MAS	860 m	MPC · JPL
155656	2000 GY_{147}	—	April 5, 2000	Socorro	LINEAR	·	1.9 km	MPC · JPL
155657	2000 GA_{152}	—	April 6, 2000	Socorro	LINEAR	·	810 m	MPC · JPL
155658	2000 GQ_{159}	—	April 7, 2000	Socorro	LINEAR	·	1.2 km	MPC · JPL
155659	2000 GE_{173}	—	April 3, 2000	Socorro	LINEAR	V	1.2 km	MPC · JPL
155660	2000 HL_{3}	—	April 26, 2000	Kitt Peak	Spacewatch	·	1.8 km	MPC · JPL
155661	2000 HE_{5}	—	April 28, 2000	Socorro	LINEAR	PHO	1.9 km	MPC · JPL
155662	2000 HE_{7}	—	April 28, 2000	Kitt Peak	Spacewatch	·	1.8 km	MPC · JPL
155663	2000 HM_{8}	—	April 27, 2000	Socorro	LINEAR	NYS	1.3 km	MPC · JPL
155664	2000 HA_{16}	—	April 29, 2000	Socorro	LINEAR	·	2.8 km	MPC · JPL
155665	2000 HP_{23}	—	April 30, 2000	Socorro	LINEAR	·	1.4 km	MPC · JPL
155666	2000 HW_{26}	—	April 24, 2000	Anderson Mesa	LONEOS	·	1.2 km	MPC · JPL
155667	2000 HQ_{28}	—	April 29, 2000	Socorro	LINEAR	PHO	2.1 km	MPC · JPL
155668	2000 HC_{43}	—	April 29, 2000	Socorro	LINEAR	·	1.5 km	MPC · JPL
155669	2000 HJ_{48}	—	April 29, 2000	Socorro	LINEAR	MAS	960 m	MPC · JPL
155670	2000 HS_{53}	—	April 29, 2000	Socorro	LINEAR	NYS	2.3 km	MPC · JPL
155671	2000 HU_{54}	—	April 29, 2000	Socorro	LINEAR	NYS	1.5 km	MPC · JPL
155672	2000 HF_{60}	—	April 25, 2000	Anderson Mesa	LONEOS	·	2.3 km	MPC · JPL
155673	2000 HL_{60}	—	April 25, 2000	Anderson Mesa	LONEOS	·	1.4 km	MPC · JPL
155674	2000 HY_{64}	—	April 26, 2000	Anderson Mesa	LONEOS	·	1.3 km	MPC · JPL
155675	2000 HO_{66}	—	April 26, 2000	Kitt Peak	Spacewatch	·	2.5 km	MPC · JPL
155676	2000 HL_{94}	—	April 29, 2000	Socorro	LINEAR	·	2.1 km	MPC · JPL
155677	2000 JE_{2}	—	May 3, 2000	Prescott	P. G. Comba	NYS	1.9 km	MPC · JPL
155678	2000 JK_{2}	—	May 3, 2000	Socorro	LINEAR	·	2.3 km	MPC · JPL
155679	2000 JP_{2}	—	May 4, 2000	Kleť	Kleť	·	2.2 km	MPC · JPL
155680	2000 JU_{10}	—	May 9, 2000	Baton Rouge	W. R. Cooney Jr.	·	1.7 km	MPC · JPL
155681	2000 JN_{21}	—	May 6, 2000	Socorro	LINEAR	·	1.9 km	MPC · JPL
155682	2000 JM_{46}	—	May 7, 2000	Socorro	LINEAR	·	1.6 km	MPC · JPL
155683	2000 JG_{53}	—	May 9, 2000	Socorro	LINEAR	NYS	1.7 km	MPC · JPL
155684	2000 JT_{54}	—	May 6, 2000	Socorro	LINEAR	·	1.5 km	MPC · JPL
155685	2000 JF_{94}	—	May 4, 2000	Socorro	LINEAR	PHO	1.4 km	MPC · JPL
155686	2000 KH_{26}	—	May 28, 2000	Socorro	LINEAR	·	1.7 km	MPC · JPL
155687	2000 KB_{38}	—	May 24, 2000	Kitt Peak	Spacewatch	V	1.1 km	MPC · JPL
155688	2000 KP_{49}	—	May 30, 2000	Kitt Peak	Spacewatch	NYS	860 m	MPC · JPL
155689	2000 LV_{2}	—	June 4, 2000	Črni Vrh	Skvarč, J.	·	2.5 km	MPC · JPL
155690	2000 OO_{14}	—	July 23, 2000	Socorro	LINEAR	·	2.1 km	MPC · JPL
155691	2000 OS_{22}	—	July 31, 2000	Socorro	LINEAR	·	5.8 km	MPC · JPL
155692	2000 OV_{28}	—	July 30, 2000	Socorro	LINEAR	·	2.3 km	MPC · JPL
155693	2000 OY_{45}	—	July 30, 2000	Socorro	LINEAR	PHO	2.2 km	MPC · JPL
155694	2000 PA_{18}	—	August 1, 2000	Socorro	LINEAR	·	2.2 km	MPC · JPL
155695	2000 PP_{19}	—	August 1, 2000	Socorro	LINEAR	·	3.9 km	MPC · JPL
155696	2000 QH_{24}	—	August 25, 2000	Socorro	LINEAR	·	1.9 km	MPC · JPL
155697	2000 QP_{24}	—	August 25, 2000	Socorro	LINEAR	·	4.0 km	MPC · JPL
155698	2000 QS_{41}	—	August 24, 2000	Socorro	LINEAR	GEF	2.2 km	MPC · JPL
155699	2000 QR_{42}	—	August 24, 2000	Socorro	LINEAR	·	2.7 km	MPC · JPL
155700	2000 QE_{67}	—	August 28, 2000	Socorro	LINEAR	(5)	2.3 km	MPC · JPL

== 155701–155800 ==
back to top

Designation			Discovery			Properties		Ref
Permanent	Provisional	Named after	Date	Site	Discoverer(s)	Category	Diam.	Ref
155701	2000 QS_{67}	—	August 28, 2000	Socorro	LINEAR	·	2.4 km	MPC · JPL
155702	2000 QJ_{69}	—	August 26, 2000	Kitt Peak	Spacewatch	EUN	2.1 km	MPC · JPL
155703	2000 QY_{77}	—	August 24, 2000	Socorro	LINEAR	·	3.0 km	MPC · JPL
155704	2000 QJ_{89}	—	August 25, 2000	Socorro	LINEAR	·	2.4 km	MPC · JPL
155705	2000 QZ_{104}	—	August 28, 2000	Socorro	LINEAR	·	2.0 km	MPC · JPL
155706	2000 QF_{122}	—	August 25, 2000	Socorro	LINEAR	·	3.0 km	MPC · JPL
155707	2000 QP_{123}	—	August 25, 2000	Socorro	LINEAR	·	3.7 km	MPC · JPL
155708	2000 QD_{138}	—	August 31, 2000	Socorro	LINEAR	·	1.8 km	MPC · JPL
155709	2000 QN_{147}	—	August 28, 2000	Socorro	LINEAR	·	2.6 km	MPC · JPL
155710	2000 QW_{150}	—	August 25, 2000	Socorro	LINEAR	EUN	2.6 km	MPC · JPL
155711	2000 QP_{160}	—	August 31, 2000	Socorro	LINEAR	·	2.0 km	MPC · JPL
155712	2000 QA_{175}	—	August 31, 2000	Socorro	LINEAR	·	2.6 km	MPC · JPL
155713	2000 QS_{185}	—	August 26, 2000	Socorro	LINEAR	(5)	1.9 km	MPC · JPL
155714	2000 QK_{187}	—	August 26, 2000	Socorro	LINEAR	JUN	2.2 km	MPC · JPL
155715	2000 QK_{191}	—	August 26, 2000	Socorro	LINEAR	·	2.8 km	MPC · JPL
155716	2000 QE_{196}	—	August 28, 2000	Socorro	LINEAR	·	2.5 km	MPC · JPL
155717	2000 QQ_{210}	—	August 31, 2000	Socorro	LINEAR	·	1.7 km	MPC · JPL
155718	2000 QT_{210}	—	August 31, 2000	Socorro	LINEAR	·	4.7 km	MPC · JPL
155719	2000 QD_{214}	—	August 31, 2000	Socorro	LINEAR	·	1.9 km	MPC · JPL
155720	2000 QF_{214}	—	August 31, 2000	Socorro	LINEAR	MAR	1.7 km	MPC · JPL
155721	2000 QQ_{214}	—	August 31, 2000	Socorro	LINEAR	·	1.9 km	MPC · JPL
155722	2000 QS_{222}	—	August 21, 2000	Anderson Mesa	LONEOS	·	2.8 km	MPC · JPL
155723	2000 QK_{229}	—	August 31, 2000	Socorro	LINEAR	·	3.0 km	MPC · JPL
155724	2000 QD_{244}	—	August 24, 2000	Socorro	LINEAR	NYS	1.9 km	MPC · JPL
155725	2000 RO_{8}	—	September 1, 2000	Socorro	LINEAR	·	1.8 km	MPC · JPL
155726	2000 RL_{35}	—	September 1, 2000	Socorro	LINEAR	·	2.8 km	MPC · JPL
155727	2000 RN_{40}	—	September 3, 2000	Socorro	LINEAR	·	2.0 km	MPC · JPL
155728	2000 RP_{47}	—	September 3, 2000	Socorro	LINEAR	·	2.7 km	MPC · JPL
155729	2000 RU_{63}	—	September 3, 2000	Socorro	LINEAR	·	4.0 km	MPC · JPL
155730	2000 RQ_{64}	—	September 1, 2000	Socorro	LINEAR	EUN	2.0 km	MPC · JPL
155731	2000 RH_{81}	—	September 1, 2000	Socorro	LINEAR	HNS	2.3 km	MPC · JPL
155732	2000 RZ_{86}	—	September 2, 2000	Anderson Mesa	LONEOS	·	2.1 km	MPC · JPL
155733	2000 RN_{89}	—	September 3, 2000	Socorro	LINEAR	·	2.5 km	MPC · JPL
155734	2000 RJ_{97}	—	September 5, 2000	Anderson Mesa	LONEOS	MAR	1.8 km	MPC · JPL
155735	2000 RZ_{101}	—	September 5, 2000	Anderson Mesa	LONEOS	MAR	2.3 km	MPC · JPL
155736	2000 RN_{103}	—	September 5, 2000	Anderson Mesa	LONEOS	HNS	3.3 km	MPC · JPL
155737	2000 SK_{6}	—	September 20, 2000	Socorro	LINEAR	·	2.4 km	MPC · JPL
155738	2000 SB_{16}	—	September 23, 2000	Socorro	LINEAR	HNS	2.5 km	MPC · JPL
155739	2000 SY_{30}	—	September 24, 2000	Socorro	LINEAR	MAS	990 m	MPC · JPL
155740	2000 SF_{46}	—	September 22, 2000	Socorro	LINEAR	·	3.4 km	MPC · JPL
155741	2000 SK_{56}	—	September 24, 2000	Socorro	LINEAR	·	3.3 km	MPC · JPL
155742	2000 SH_{59}	—	September 24, 2000	Socorro	LINEAR	·	1.7 km	MPC · JPL
155743	2000 SO_{60}	—	September 24, 2000	Socorro	LINEAR	·	2.4 km	MPC · JPL
155744	2000 SC_{61}	—	September 24, 2000	Socorro	LINEAR	·	1.8 km	MPC · JPL
155745	2000 SO_{67}	—	September 24, 2000	Socorro	LINEAR	·	3.2 km	MPC · JPL
155746	2000 SX_{67}	—	September 24, 2000	Socorro	LINEAR	(5)	1.8 km	MPC · JPL
155747	2000 SV_{93}	—	September 23, 2000	Socorro	LINEAR	KRM	3.4 km	MPC · JPL
155748	2000 SV_{95}	—	September 23, 2000	Socorro	LINEAR	·	3.1 km	MPC · JPL
155749	2000 SR_{97}	—	September 23, 2000	Socorro	LINEAR	fast	2.6 km	MPC · JPL
155750	2000 SK_{102}	—	September 24, 2000	Socorro	LINEAR	·	3.7 km	MPC · JPL
155751	2000 SY_{102}	—	September 24, 2000	Socorro	LINEAR	·	1.9 km	MPC · JPL
155752	2000 SP_{110}	—	September 24, 2000	Socorro	LINEAR	KON	3.7 km	MPC · JPL
155753	2000 SJ_{112}	—	September 24, 2000	Socorro	LINEAR	·	2.6 km	MPC · JPL
155754	2000 SB_{118}	—	September 24, 2000	Socorro	LINEAR	·	1.7 km	MPC · JPL
155755	2000 SK_{124}	—	September 24, 2000	Socorro	LINEAR	·	3.2 km	MPC · JPL
155756	2000 SY_{127}	—	September 24, 2000	Socorro	LINEAR	BRG	2.2 km	MPC · JPL
155757	2000 SY_{132}	—	September 23, 2000	Socorro	LINEAR	·	2.0 km	MPC · JPL
155758	2000 SJ_{139}	—	September 23, 2000	Socorro	LINEAR	·	2.1 km	MPC · JPL
155759	2000 SG_{140}	—	September 23, 2000	Socorro	LINEAR	(5)	1.9 km	MPC · JPL
155760	2000 SP_{147}	—	September 24, 2000	Socorro	LINEAR	·	1.5 km	MPC · JPL
155761	2000 SN_{161}	—	September 19, 2000	Haleakala	NEAT	·	4.2 km	MPC · JPL
155762	2000 SC_{164}	—	September 24, 2000	Socorro	LINEAR	H	850 m	MPC · JPL
155763	2000 SJ_{178}	—	September 28, 2000	Socorro	LINEAR	·	3.5 km	MPC · JPL
155764	2000 SS_{178}	—	September 28, 2000	Socorro	LINEAR	·	1.9 km	MPC · JPL
155765	2000 SM_{189}	—	September 22, 2000	Kitt Peak	Spacewatch	·	3.2 km	MPC · JPL
155766	2000 SO_{223}	—	September 27, 2000	Socorro	LINEAR	·	2.3 km	MPC · JPL
155767	2000 SZ_{228}	—	September 28, 2000	Socorro	LINEAR	PAD	2.7 km	MPC · JPL
155768	2000 SC_{232}	—	September 26, 2000	Socorro	LINEAR	H	780 m	MPC · JPL
155769	2000 ST_{232}	—	September 30, 2000	Socorro	LINEAR	H	890 m	MPC · JPL
155770	2000 SF_{238}	—	September 25, 2000	Socorro	LINEAR	·	2.0 km	MPC · JPL
155771	2000 SK_{238}	—	September 26, 2000	Socorro	LINEAR	·	2.1 km	MPC · JPL
155772	2000 SM_{240}	—	September 25, 2000	Socorro	LINEAR	H	1 km	MPC · JPL
155773	2000 ST_{240}	—	September 26, 2000	Socorro	LINEAR	H	940 m	MPC · JPL
155774	2000 SS_{244}	—	September 24, 2000	Socorro	LINEAR	·	2.3 km	MPC · JPL
155775	2000 SZ_{247}	—	September 24, 2000	Socorro	LINEAR	(5)	2.2 km	MPC · JPL
155776	2000 SD_{275}	—	September 28, 2000	Socorro	LINEAR	·	2.9 km	MPC · JPL
155777	2000 SY_{282}	—	September 23, 2000	Socorro	LINEAR	MAR	1.9 km	MPC · JPL
155778	2000 SF_{287}	—	September 26, 2000	Socorro	LINEAR	EUN	3.0 km	MPC · JPL
155779	2000 SQ_{290}	—	September 27, 2000	Socorro	LINEAR	·	2.8 km	MPC · JPL
155780	2000 SM_{304}	—	September 30, 2000	Socorro	LINEAR	·	4.5 km	MPC · JPL
155781	2000 SX_{311}	—	September 27, 2000	Socorro	LINEAR	·	2.5 km	MPC · JPL
155782	2000 SG_{334}	—	September 26, 2000	Haleakala	NEAT	·	3.6 km	MPC · JPL
155783	2000 SH_{338}	—	September 25, 2000	Haleakala	NEAT	·	4.7 km	MPC · JPL
155784 Ercol	2000 SH_{345}	Ercol	September 19, 2000	Kitt Peak	M. W. Buie	·	1.9 km	MPC · JPL
155785	2000 SS_{351}	—	September 29, 2000	Anderson Mesa	LONEOS	·	1.4 km	MPC · JPL
155786	2000 SD_{358}	—	September 28, 2000	Anderson Mesa	LONEOS	L5	16 km	MPC · JPL
155787	2000 SL_{365}	—	September 21, 2000	Anderson Mesa	LONEOS	·	1.3 km	MPC · JPL
155788	2000 SR_{366}	—	September 23, 2000	Anderson Mesa	LONEOS	KRM	3.3 km	MPC · JPL
155789	2000 TD_{9}	—	October 1, 2000	Socorro	LINEAR	L5	11 km	MPC · JPL
155790	2000 TC_{10}	—	October 1, 2000	Socorro	LINEAR	·	1.3 km	MPC · JPL
155791	2000 TC_{15}	—	October 1, 2000	Socorro	LINEAR	·	3.4 km	MPC · JPL
155792	2000 TL_{26}	—	October 2, 2000	Socorro	LINEAR	·	2.1 km	MPC · JPL
155793	2000 TM_{37}	—	October 1, 2000	Socorro	LINEAR	·	2.2 km	MPC · JPL
155794	2000 TZ_{52}	—	October 1, 2000	Socorro	LINEAR	·	2.2 km	MPC · JPL
155795	2000 UG_{10}	—	October 24, 2000	Socorro	LINEAR	·	3.9 km	MPC · JPL
155796	2000 UQ_{13}	—	October 24, 2000	Črni Vrh	Črni Vrh	·	1.6 km	MPC · JPL
155797	2000 UM_{39}	—	October 24, 2000	Socorro	LINEAR	·	4.1 km	MPC · JPL
155798	2000 UU_{40}	—	October 24, 2000	Socorro	LINEAR	·	3.2 km	MPC · JPL
155799	2000 UO_{45}	—	October 24, 2000	Socorro	LINEAR	·	2.8 km	MPC · JPL
155800	2000 UT_{54}	—	October 24, 2000	Socorro	LINEAR	·	2.5 km	MPC · JPL

== 155801–155900 ==
back to top

Designation			Discovery			Properties		Ref
Permanent	Provisional	Named after	Date	Site	Discoverer(s)	Category	Diam.	Ref
155801	2000 UT_{61}	—	October 25, 2000	Socorro	LINEAR	·	1.6 km	MPC · JPL
155802	2000 UK_{65}	—	October 25, 2000	Socorro	LINEAR	·	3.4 km	MPC · JPL
155803	2000 UL_{108}	—	October 30, 2000	Socorro	LINEAR	·	2.4 km	MPC · JPL
155804	2000 VA_{14}	—	November 1, 2000	Socorro	LINEAR	·	3.6 km	MPC · JPL
155805	2000 VD_{26}	—	November 1, 2000	Socorro	LINEAR	NEM	3.0 km	MPC · JPL
155806	2000 VE_{28}	—	November 1, 2000	Socorro	LINEAR	·	2.2 km	MPC · JPL
155807	2000 VU_{29}	—	November 1, 2000	Socorro	LINEAR	·	3.0 km	MPC · JPL
155808	2000 VF_{54}	—	November 3, 2000	Socorro	LINEAR	·	3.9 km	MPC · JPL
155809	2000 VE_{58}	—	November 3, 2000	Socorro	LINEAR	(5)	2.3 km	MPC · JPL
155810	2000 VA_{60}	—	November 1, 2000	Socorro	LINEAR	·	3.7 km	MPC · JPL
155811	2000 WL_{20}	—	November 25, 2000	Kitt Peak	Spacewatch	·	2.6 km	MPC · JPL
155812	2000 WS_{20}	—	November 25, 2000	Kitt Peak	Spacewatch	WIT	2.0 km	MPC · JPL
155813	2000 WZ_{26}	—	November 26, 2000	Bohyunsan	Bohyunsan	KOR	1.6 km	MPC · JPL
155814	2000 WY_{31}	—	November 20, 2000	Socorro	LINEAR	·	2.4 km	MPC · JPL
155815	2000 WU_{41}	—	November 20, 2000	Socorro	LINEAR	DOR	5.5 km	MPC · JPL
155816	2000 WK_{67}	—	November 27, 2000	Socorro	LINEAR	H	1.0 km	MPC · JPL
155817	2000 WR_{74}	—	November 20, 2000	Socorro	LINEAR	·	1.9 km	MPC · JPL
155818	2000 WK_{89}	—	November 21, 2000	Socorro	LINEAR	·	2.3 km	MPC · JPL
155819	2000 WS_{90}	—	November 21, 2000	Socorro	LINEAR	·	4.2 km	MPC · JPL
155820	2000 WA_{95}	—	November 21, 2000	Socorro	LINEAR	MAR	2.2 km	MPC · JPL
155821	2000 WM_{126}	—	November 16, 2000	Kitt Peak	Spacewatch	·	3.1 km	MPC · JPL
155822	2000 WP_{130}	—	November 20, 2000	Kitt Peak	Spacewatch	·	4.3 km	MPC · JPL
155823	2000 WA_{151}	—	November 20, 2000	Socorro	LINEAR	H	1.2 km	MPC · JPL
155824	2000 WP_{158}	—	November 30, 2000	Haleakala	NEAT	·	5.0 km	MPC · JPL
155825	2000 WW_{161}	—	November 20, 2000	Anderson Mesa	LONEOS	·	2.6 km	MPC · JPL
155826	2000 WL_{172}	—	November 25, 2000	Socorro	LINEAR	MAR	1.8 km	MPC · JPL
155827	2000 WA_{178}	—	November 28, 2000	Socorro	LINEAR	EUN	2.4 km	MPC · JPL
155828	2000 XO_{2}	—	December 1, 2000	Socorro	LINEAR	H	1.2 km	MPC · JPL
155829	2000 XV_{21}	—	December 4, 2000	Socorro	LINEAR	·	2.4 km	MPC · JPL
155830	2000 XL_{23}	—	December 4, 2000	Socorro	LINEAR	·	3.7 km	MPC · JPL
155831	2000 XE_{47}	—	December 15, 2000	Socorro	LINEAR	·	5.6 km	MPC · JPL
155832	2000 XB_{52}	—	December 6, 2000	Socorro	LINEAR	·	4.8 km	MPC · JPL
155833	2000 YB	—	December 16, 2000	Kitt Peak	Spacewatch	·	2.7 km	MPC · JPL
155834	2000 YG_{3}	—	December 18, 2000	Kitt Peak	Spacewatch	·	1.9 km	MPC · JPL
155835	2000 YA_{8}	—	December 21, 2000	Eskridge	G. Hug	·	4.0 km	MPC · JPL
155836	2000 YC_{22}	—	December 29, 2000	Desert Beaver	W. K. Y. Yeung	·	3.2 km	MPC · JPL
155837	2000 YG_{26}	—	December 23, 2000	Socorro	LINEAR	·	3.4 km	MPC · JPL
155838	2000 YV_{48}	—	December 30, 2000	Socorro	LINEAR	·	2.6 km	MPC · JPL
155839	2000 YZ_{50}	—	December 30, 2000	Socorro	LINEAR	EOS	3.8 km	MPC · JPL
155840	2000 YA_{60}	—	December 30, 2000	Socorro	LINEAR	·	3.3 km	MPC · JPL
155841	2000 YU_{69}	—	December 30, 2000	Socorro	LINEAR	·	2.6 km	MPC · JPL
155842	2000 YC_{87}	—	December 30, 2000	Socorro	LINEAR	·	4.5 km	MPC · JPL
155843	2000 YL_{100}	—	December 30, 2000	Haleakala	NEAT	·	4.4 km	MPC · JPL
155844	2000 YZ_{112}	—	December 30, 2000	Socorro	LINEAR	BRA	3.4 km	MPC · JPL
155845	2001 AG_{3}	—	January 4, 2001	Fair Oaks Ranch	J. V. McClusky	H	1.2 km	MPC · JPL
155846	2001 AM_{27}	—	January 5, 2001	Socorro	LINEAR	·	5.5 km	MPC · JPL
155847	2001 AD_{31}	—	January 4, 2001	Socorro	LINEAR	·	4.2 km	MPC · JPL
155848	2001 AO_{44}	—	January 15, 2001	Oizumi	T. Kobayashi	AEG	7.1 km	MPC · JPL
155849	2001 AK_{46}	—	January 15, 2001	Socorro	LINEAR	·	5.5 km	MPC · JPL
155850	2001 AY_{46}	—	January 15, 2001	Socorro	LINEAR	H	1.1 km	MPC · JPL
155851	2001 BP_{10}	—	January 19, 2001	Socorro	LINEAR	H	1.1 km	MPC · JPL
155852	2001 BB_{19}	—	January 19, 2001	Socorro	LINEAR	·	4.5 km	MPC · JPL
155853	2001 BA_{25}	—	January 20, 2001	Socorro	LINEAR	·	4.8 km	MPC · JPL
155854	2001 BJ_{35}	—	January 20, 2001	Socorro	LINEAR	·	5.9 km	MPC · JPL
155855	2001 BV_{38}	—	January 19, 2001	Kitt Peak	Spacewatch	·	3.4 km	MPC · JPL
155856	2001 BD_{48}	—	January 21, 2001	Socorro	LINEAR	·	5.2 km	MPC · JPL
155857	2001 BJ_{49}	—	January 21, 2001	Socorro	LINEAR	·	4.0 km	MPC · JPL
155858	2001 BT_{51}	—	January 16, 2001	Haleakala	NEAT	·	3.2 km	MPC · JPL
155859	2001 BY_{71}	—	January 31, 2001	Socorro	LINEAR	·	2.7 km	MPC · JPL
155860	2001 BT_{77}	—	January 25, 2001	Socorro	LINEAR	EOS	3.2 km	MPC · JPL
155861	2001 CA_{33}	—	February 13, 2001	Socorro	LINEAR	·	5.1 km	MPC · JPL
155862	2001 CP_{33}	—	February 13, 2001	Socorro	LINEAR	·	6.6 km	MPC · JPL
155863	2001 CQ_{34}	—	February 13, 2001	Socorro	LINEAR	TIR	5.2 km	MPC · JPL
155864	2001 CE_{40}	—	February 13, 2001	Socorro	LINEAR	·	6.6 km	MPC · JPL
155865	2001 DK	—	February 16, 2001	Desert Beaver	W. K. Y. Yeung	·	4.6 km	MPC · JPL
155866	2001 DW_{10}	—	February 17, 2001	Socorro	LINEAR	·	4.4 km	MPC · JPL
155867	2001 DO_{18}	—	February 16, 2001	Socorro	LINEAR	·	6.2 km	MPC · JPL
155868	2001 DD_{26}	—	February 17, 2001	Socorro	LINEAR	EOS	4.3 km	MPC · JPL
155869	2001 DK_{27}	—	February 17, 2001	Socorro	LINEAR	·	3.8 km	MPC · JPL
155870	2001 DL_{27}	—	February 17, 2001	Socorro	LINEAR	fast	4.0 km	MPC · JPL
155871	2001 DG_{40}	—	February 19, 2001	Socorro	LINEAR	·	4.3 km	MPC · JPL
155872	2001 DM_{57}	—	February 16, 2001	Kitt Peak	Spacewatch	KOR	2.1 km	MPC · JPL
155873	2001 DB_{59}	—	February 21, 2001	Socorro	LINEAR	T_{j} (2.99) · EUP	9.2 km	MPC · JPL
155874	2001 DQ_{82}	—	February 22, 2001	Kitt Peak	Spacewatch	·	5.1 km	MPC · JPL
155875	2001 DR_{91}	—	February 20, 2001	Haleakala	NEAT	·	4.7 km	MPC · JPL
155876	2001 DS_{96}	—	February 17, 2001	Socorro	LINEAR	·	3.4 km	MPC · JPL
155877	2001 DF_{106}	—	February 20, 2001	Kitt Peak	Spacewatch	·	4.5 km	MPC · JPL
155878	2001 ED_{4}	—	March 2, 2001	Anderson Mesa	LONEOS	·	5.8 km	MPC · JPL
155879	2001 EK_{4}	—	March 2, 2001	Anderson Mesa	LONEOS	·	5.5 km	MPC · JPL
155880	2001 ED_{7}	—	March 2, 2001	Anderson Mesa	LONEOS	·	5.3 km	MPC · JPL
155881	2001 EF_{19}	—	March 14, 2001	Haleakala	NEAT	·	5.4 km	MPC · JPL
155882	2001 FJ_{26}	—	March 18, 2001	Socorro	LINEAR	·	5.1 km	MPC · JPL
155883	2001 FU_{38}	—	March 18, 2001	Socorro	LINEAR	·	5.5 km	MPC · JPL
155884	2001 FC_{39}	—	March 18, 2001	Socorro	LINEAR	·	7.2 km	MPC · JPL
155885	2001 FZ_{64}	—	March 19, 2001	Socorro	LINEAR	·	5.2 km	MPC · JPL
155886	2001 FP_{67}	—	March 19, 2001	Socorro	LINEAR	·	6.2 km	MPC · JPL
155887	2001 FU_{68}	—	March 19, 2001	Socorro	LINEAR	·	7.2 km	MPC · JPL
155888	2001 FY_{83}	—	March 26, 2001	Kitt Peak	Spacewatch	·	3.4 km	MPC · JPL
155889	2001 FK_{84}	—	March 26, 2001	Kitt Peak	Spacewatch	·	3.3 km	MPC · JPL
155890	2001 FY_{84}	—	March 26, 2001	Kitt Peak	Spacewatch	·	7.2 km	MPC · JPL
155891	2001 FU_{87}	—	March 21, 2001	Anderson Mesa	LONEOS	·	6.0 km	MPC · JPL
155892	2001 FP_{93}	—	March 16, 2001	Socorro	LINEAR	·	5.6 km	MPC · JPL
155893	2001 FL_{100}	—	March 17, 2001	Socorro	LINEAR	·	5.3 km	MPC · JPL
155894	2001 FZ_{106}	—	March 18, 2001	Anderson Mesa	LONEOS	·	4.9 km	MPC · JPL
155895	2001 FR_{108}	—	March 18, 2001	Socorro	LINEAR	·	5.2 km	MPC · JPL
155896	2001 FT_{108}	—	March 18, 2001	Socorro	LINEAR	·	6.6 km	MPC · JPL
155897	2001 FD_{116}	—	March 19, 2001	Socorro	LINEAR	·	4.4 km	MPC · JPL
155898	2001 FZ_{116}	—	March 19, 2001	Socorro	LINEAR	(5651)	5.7 km	MPC · JPL
155899	2001 FW_{135}	—	March 21, 2001	Haleakala	NEAT	·	3.7 km	MPC · JPL
155900	2001 FJ_{142}	—	March 23, 2001	Anderson Mesa	LONEOS	·	5.3 km	MPC · JPL

== 155901–156000 ==
back to top

Designation			Discovery			Properties		Ref
Permanent	Provisional	Named after	Date	Site	Discoverer(s)	Category	Diam.	Ref
155901	2001 FK_{179}	—	March 20, 2001	Anderson Mesa	LONEOS	·	5.5 km	MPC · JPL
155902	2001 FA_{184}	—	March 25, 2001	Kitt Peak	M. W. Buie	·	5.1 km	MPC · JPL
155903	2001 FN_{184}	—	March 26, 2001	Kitt Peak	M. W. Buie	EOS	3.8 km	MPC · JPL
155904	2001 HA_{14}	—	April 23, 2001	Kitt Peak	Spacewatch	VER	4.8 km	MPC · JPL
155905	2001 HV_{66}	—	April 25, 2001	Anderson Mesa	LONEOS	EUP	7.4 km	MPC · JPL
155906	2001 MR_{7}	—	June 23, 2001	Palomar	NEAT	·	6.0 km	MPC · JPL
155907	2001 MV_{23}	—	June 27, 2001	Haleakala	NEAT	·	1.4 km	MPC · JPL
155908	2001 NG_{4}	—	July 13, 2001	Palomar	NEAT	·	1.2 km	MPC · JPL
155909	2001 NF_{15}	—	July 13, 2001	Palomar	NEAT	·	1.3 km	MPC · JPL
155910	2001 OH	—	July 16, 2001	Anderson Mesa	LONEOS	·	1.2 km	MPC · JPL
155911	2001 OQ_{38}	—	July 20, 2001	Palomar	NEAT	·	2.3 km	MPC · JPL
155912	2001 OW_{40}	—	July 20, 2001	Palomar	NEAT	·	2.1 km	MPC · JPL
155913	2001 OR_{43}	—	July 23, 2001	Palomar	NEAT	·	1.9 km	MPC · JPL
155914	2001 OG_{55}	—	July 22, 2001	Palomar	NEAT	V	1.1 km	MPC · JPL
155915	2001 OQ_{55}	—	July 22, 2001	Palomar	NEAT	·	1.8 km	MPC · JPL
155916	2001 ON_{68}	—	July 16, 2001	Anderson Mesa	LONEOS	·	1.2 km	MPC · JPL
155917	2001 OH_{73}	—	July 21, 2001	Anderson Mesa	LONEOS	·	1.8 km	MPC · JPL
155918	2001 OF_{86}	—	July 22, 2001	Socorro	LINEAR	NYS	1.4 km	MPC · JPL
155919	2001 ON_{95}	—	July 31, 2001	Palomar	NEAT	·	1.2 km	MPC · JPL
155920	2001 OG_{104}	—	July 30, 2001	Socorro	LINEAR	·	1 km	MPC · JPL
155921	2001 OJ_{105}	—	July 29, 2001	Anderson Mesa	LONEOS	·	5.1 km	MPC · JPL
155922	2001 PT_{5}	—	August 10, 2001	Haleakala	NEAT	·	1.2 km	MPC · JPL
155923	2001 PB_{14}	—	August 14, 2001	San Marcello	L. Tesi, A. Boattini	·	1.5 km	MPC · JPL
155924	2001 PG_{25}	—	August 11, 2001	Haleakala	NEAT	·	1.2 km	MPC · JPL
155925	2001 PW_{27}	—	August 13, 2001	Haleakala	NEAT	·	960 m	MPC · JPL
155926	2001 PE_{29}	—	August 15, 2001	San Marcello	L. Tesi, M. Tombelli	NYS	1.8 km	MPC · JPL
155927	2001 PN_{43}	—	August 13, 2001	Haleakala	NEAT	·	1.5 km	MPC · JPL
155928	2001 PO_{43}	—	August 13, 2001	Haleakala	NEAT	·	1.3 km	MPC · JPL
155929	2001 PG_{53}	—	August 14, 2001	Haleakala	NEAT	NYS	1.5 km	MPC · JPL
155930	2001 PJ_{54}	—	August 14, 2001	Haleakala	NEAT	MAS	1.1 km	MPC · JPL
155931	2001 PV_{58}	—	August 14, 2001	Haleakala	NEAT	·	1.1 km	MPC · JPL
155932	2001 QD_{1}	—	August 16, 2001	Socorro	LINEAR	·	1.4 km	MPC · JPL
155933	2001 QB_{2}	—	August 16, 2001	Socorro	LINEAR	·	1.8 km	MPC · JPL
155934	2001 QB_{13}	—	August 16, 2001	Socorro	LINEAR	NYS	1.7 km	MPC · JPL
155935	2001 QN_{15}	—	August 16, 2001	Socorro	LINEAR	·	1.3 km	MPC · JPL
155936	2001 QG_{17}	—	August 16, 2001	Socorro	LINEAR	·	1.2 km	MPC · JPL
155937	2001 QP_{28}	—	August 16, 2001	Socorro	LINEAR	NYS	2.9 km	MPC · JPL
155938	2001 QR_{32}	—	August 17, 2001	Palomar	NEAT	·	910 m	MPC · JPL
155939	2001 QY_{35}	—	August 16, 2001	Socorro	LINEAR	·	1.2 km	MPC · JPL
155940	2001 QX_{41}	—	August 16, 2001	Socorro	LINEAR	·	1.1 km	MPC · JPL
155941	2001 QL_{43}	—	August 16, 2001	Socorro	LINEAR	·	1.3 km	MPC · JPL
155942	2001 QS_{54}	—	August 16, 2001	Socorro	LINEAR	·	1.3 km	MPC · JPL
155943	2001 QR_{55}	—	August 16, 2001	Socorro	LINEAR	·	1.4 km	MPC · JPL
155944	2001 QW_{55}	—	August 16, 2001	Socorro	LINEAR	NYS	1.7 km	MPC · JPL
155945	2001 QD_{56}	—	August 16, 2001	Socorro	LINEAR	·	1.3 km	MPC · JPL
155946	2001 QK_{65}	—	August 17, 2001	Socorro	LINEAR	·	1.8 km	MPC · JPL
155947	2001 QB_{69}	—	August 17, 2001	Socorro	LINEAR	·	2.3 km	MPC · JPL
155948 Maquet	2001 QA_{73}	Maquet	August 21, 2001	Pic du Midi	Pic du Midi	·	1.1 km	MPC · JPL
155949	2001 QC_{75}	—	August 16, 2001	Socorro	LINEAR	V	1.6 km	MPC · JPL
155950	2001 QP_{79}	—	August 16, 2001	Socorro	LINEAR	·	2.9 km	MPC · JPL
155951	2001 QD_{89}	—	August 22, 2001	Desert Eagle	W. K. Y. Yeung	V	1.0 km	MPC · JPL
155952	2001 QU_{91}	—	August 19, 2001	Socorro	LINEAR	·	1.2 km	MPC · JPL
155953	2001 QG_{93}	—	August 22, 2001	Socorro	LINEAR	·	2.4 km	MPC · JPL
155954	2001 QR_{95}	—	August 22, 2001	Kitt Peak	Spacewatch	3:2	7.7 km	MPC · JPL
155955	2001 QS_{97}	—	August 17, 2001	Socorro	LINEAR	·	2.4 km	MPC · JPL
155956	2001 QX_{98}	—	August 22, 2001	Socorro	LINEAR	·	1.7 km	MPC · JPL
155957	2001 QU_{99}	—	August 20, 2001	Socorro	LINEAR	·	1.2 km	MPC · JPL
155958	2001 QL_{106}	—	August 18, 2001	Anderson Mesa	LONEOS	·	1.9 km	MPC · JPL
155959	2001 QF_{127}	—	August 20, 2001	Socorro	LINEAR	T_{j} (2.98) · HIL · 3:2	8.8 km	MPC · JPL
155960	2001 QV_{143}	—	August 21, 2001	Kitt Peak	Spacewatch	·	1.0 km	MPC · JPL
155961	2001 QE_{145}	—	August 24, 2001	Kitt Peak	Spacewatch	·	1.1 km	MPC · JPL
155962	2001 QK_{145}	—	August 24, 2001	Kitt Peak	Spacewatch	·	3.4 km	MPC · JPL
155963	2001 QJ_{158}	—	August 23, 2001	Anderson Mesa	LONEOS	·	2.6 km	MPC · JPL
155964	2001 QL_{181}	—	August 29, 2001	Palomar	NEAT	·	2.6 km	MPC · JPL
155965	2001 QU_{198}	—	August 22, 2001	Socorro	LINEAR	ERI	3.1 km	MPC · JPL
155966	2001 QF_{205}	—	August 23, 2001	Anderson Mesa	LONEOS	·	1.3 km	MPC · JPL
155967	2001 QA_{215}	—	August 23, 2001	Anderson Mesa	LONEOS	·	1.9 km	MPC · JPL
155968	2001 QC_{219}	—	August 23, 2001	Anderson Mesa	LONEOS	·	1.1 km	MPC · JPL
155969	2001 QJ_{219}	—	August 23, 2001	Kitt Peak	Spacewatch	NYS ·	2.6 km	MPC · JPL
155970	2001 QL_{220}	—	August 23, 2001	Kitt Peak	Spacewatch	·	1.7 km	MPC · JPL
155971	2001 QK_{224}	—	August 24, 2001	Socorro	LINEAR	·	870 m	MPC · JPL
155972	2001 QW_{227}	—	August 24, 2001	Anderson Mesa	LONEOS	·	2.9 km	MPC · JPL
155973	2001 QJ_{235}	—	August 24, 2001	Socorro	LINEAR	·	1.3 km	MPC · JPL
155974	2001 QN_{236}	—	August 24, 2001	Socorro	LINEAR	·	2.2 km	MPC · JPL
155975	2001 QS_{238}	—	August 24, 2001	Socorro	LINEAR	V	980 m	MPC · JPL
155976	2001 QP_{239}	—	August 24, 2001	Socorro	LINEAR	V	1.3 km	MPC · JPL
155977	2001 QB_{240}	—	August 24, 2001	Socorro	LINEAR	·	1.5 km	MPC · JPL
155978	2001 QF_{242}	—	August 24, 2001	Socorro	LINEAR	·	1.1 km	MPC · JPL
155979	2001 QQ_{242}	—	August 24, 2001	Socorro	LINEAR	·	1.5 km	MPC · JPL
155980	2001 QR_{246}	—	August 24, 2001	Socorro	LINEAR	·	2.4 km	MPC · JPL
155981	2001 QC_{247}	—	August 24, 2001	Socorro	LINEAR	NYS	2.1 km	MPC · JPL
155982	2001 QE_{247}	—	August 24, 2001	Socorro	LINEAR	·	1.2 km	MPC · JPL
155983	2001 QM_{250}	—	August 24, 2001	Haleakala	NEAT	·	1.3 km	MPC · JPL
155984	2001 QD_{256}	—	August 25, 2001	Socorro	LINEAR	·	1.4 km	MPC · JPL
155985	2001 QM_{256}	—	August 25, 2001	Socorro	LINEAR	·	1.9 km	MPC · JPL
155986	2001 QK_{258}	—	August 25, 2001	Socorro	LINEAR	·	1.4 km	MPC · JPL
155987	2001 QX_{258}	—	August 25, 2001	Socorro	LINEAR	·	1.4 km	MPC · JPL
155988	2001 QJ_{260}	—	August 25, 2001	Socorro	LINEAR	·	1.4 km	MPC · JPL
155989	2001 QF_{267}	—	August 20, 2001	Socorro	LINEAR	·	3.9 km	MPC · JPL
155990	2001 QX_{283}	—	August 18, 2001	Anderson Mesa	LONEOS	·	1.5 km	MPC · JPL
155991	2001 QB_{284}	—	August 18, 2001	Palomar	NEAT	·	2.8 km	MPC · JPL
155992	2001 QN_{296}	—	August 24, 2001	Socorro	LINEAR	·	1.4 km	MPC · JPL
155993	2001 RE_{1}	—	September 7, 2001	Socorro	LINEAR	NYS	2.0 km	MPC · JPL
155994	2001 RJ_{2}	—	September 11, 2001	Socorro	LINEAR	·	1.4 km	MPC · JPL
155995	2001 RX_{5}	—	September 9, 2001	Desert Eagle	W. K. Y. Yeung	·	1.1 km	MPC · JPL
155996	2001 RD_{11}	—	September 10, 2001	Desert Eagle	W. K. Y. Yeung	·	3.3 km	MPC · JPL
155997 Robertaciani	2001 RP_{16}	Robertaciani	September 12, 2001	San Marcello	A. Boattini, M. Tombelli	·	3.9 km	MPC · JPL
155998	2001 RQ_{21}	—	September 7, 2001	Socorro	LINEAR	·	1.9 km	MPC · JPL
155999	2001 RV_{26}	—	September 7, 2001	Socorro	LINEAR	·	900 m	MPC · JPL
156000	2001 RR_{27}	—	September 7, 2001	Socorro	LINEAR	·	1.2 km	MPC · JPL

back to top

== See also ==
- Meanings of minor-planet names: 155001–156000
