= Meanings of minor-planet names: 155001–156000 =

As minor planet discoveries are confirmed, they are given a permanent number by the IAU's Minor Planet Center (MPC), and the discoverers can then submit names for them, following the IAU's naming conventions. The list below concerns those minor planets in the specified number-range that have received names, and explains the meanings of those names.

Official naming citations of newly named small Solar System bodies are approved and published in a bulletin by IAU's Working Group for Small Bodies Nomenclature (WGSBN). Before May 2021, citations were published in MPC's Minor Planet Circulars for many decades. Recent citations can also be found on the JPL Small-Body Database (SBDB). Until his death in 2016, German astronomer Lutz D. Schmadel compiled these citations into the Dictionary of Minor Planet Names (DMP) and regularly updated the collection.

Based on Paul Herget's The Names of the Minor Planets, Schmadel also researched the unclear origin of numerous asteroids, most of which had been named prior to World War II. This article incorporates text from this source, which is in the public domain: SBDB New namings may only be added to this list below after official publication as the preannouncement of names is condemned. The WGSBN publishes a comprehensive guideline for the naming rules of non-cometary small Solar System bodies.

== 155001–155100 ==
Named minor planet	Provisional	This minor planet was named for...	Ref · Catalog
155083 Banneker	2005 SE_{134}	Benjamin Banneker (1731–1806), freeborn African-American farmer, clockmaker, writer and scientist	JPL · 155083

== 155101–155200 ==
back to top

Named minor planet	Provisional	This minor planet was named for...	Ref · Catalog
155116 Verkhivnya	2005 TJ_{49}	Verkhivnya, a small Ukrainian village, where French novelist Honoré de Balzac wrote La Marâtre, Les Paysans and part of La Comédie humaine at the estate of his wife, countess Evelina Hańska	JPL · 155116
155138 Pucinskas	2005 TM_{169}	Aloyzas Pucinskas (born 1933), associate professor at the Astronomical Observatory of Vilnius University	JPL · 155138
155142 Tenagra	2005 UD_{4}	Tenagra, mythical island mentioned ("Darmok and Jalad at Tenagra") in the Darmok episode of Star Trek - The Next Generation, and the namesake of the discovering Tenagra II Observatory	JPL · 155142

== 155201–155300 ==
back to top

Named minor planet	Provisional	This minor planet was named for...	Ref · Catalog
155215 Vámostibor	2005 VU_{2}	Tibor Vámos (born 1926) is an electrical engineer, full member of the Hungarian Academy of Sciences, and the father of data communication in Hungary. He was the winner of the 2005 annual science communication award of the Club of Hungarian Science Journalists.	JPL · 155215
155217 Radnóti	2005 VH_{5}	Miklós Radnóti (1909–1944), born Miklós Glatter, one of the greatest Hungarian poets of the 20th century.	IAU · 155217
155270 Dianawheeler	2005 WH_{113}	Diana E. Wheeler (born 1950) made fundamental contributions to understanding the physiological basis of caste determination in social insects. Her research blazed the trail for uncovering the relationship between environmental factors and physiology and the evolution of eusociality which is at the core for gene-environment interactions.	JPL · 155270
155290 Anniegrauer	2005 XJ_{40}	Patricia Ann ("Annie") Purnell Grauer (born 1942), American photographer, cook, homemaker, writer and a student of the night sky	JPL · 155290

== 155301–155400 ==
back to top

Named minor planet	Provisional	This minor planet was named for...	Ref · Catalog
There are no named minor planets in this number range

== 155401–155500 ==
back to top

Named minor planet	Provisional	This minor planet was named for...	Ref · Catalog
155438 Velásquez	1998 DV	Diego Velázquez (1599–1660), Spanish painter of the Spanish Golden Age	JPL · 155438

== 155501–155600 ==
back to top

Named minor planet	Provisional	This minor planet was named for...	Ref · Catalog
There are no named minor planets in this number range

== 155601–155700 ==
back to top

Named minor planet	Provisional	This minor planet was named for...	Ref · Catalog
There are no named minor planets in this number range

== 155701–155800 ==
back to top

Named minor planet	Provisional	This minor planet was named for...	Ref · Catalog
155784 Ercol	2000 SH_{345}	Carl Jack Ercol (born 1959) is a systems engineer at the Applied Physics Laboratory. He served as the Thermal Subsystem Lead for the New Horizons mission to Pluto.	JPL · 155784

== 155801–155900 ==
back to top

Named minor planet	Provisional	This minor planet was named for...	Ref · Catalog
There are no named minor planets in this number range

== 155901–156000 ==
back to top

Named minor planet	Provisional	This minor planet was named for...	Ref · Catalog
155948 Maquet	2001 QA_{73}	Lucie Maquet (born 1985), French astronomer who researches cometary non-gravitational forces at IMCCE in Paris, and observer at the Pic du Midi Observatory	JPL · 155948
155997 Robertaciani	2001 RP_{16}	Roberta Ciani, Italian amateur astronomer.	IAU · 155997

back to top

Preceded by 154,001–155,000	Meanings of minor-planet names List of minor planets: 155,001–156,000	Succeeded by 156,001–157,000
