= List of minor planets: 154001–155000 =

The following is a partial list of minor planets, running from minor-planet number 154001 through 155000, inclusive. The primary data for this and other partial lists is based on JPL's "Small-Body Orbital Elements" and data available from the Minor Planet Center. Critical list information is also provided by the MPC, unless otherwise specified from Lowell Observatory. A detailed description of the table's columns and additional sources are given on the main page including a complete list of every page in this series, and a statistical break-up on the dynamical classification of minor planets.

Also see the summary list of all named bodies in numerical and alphabetical order, and the corresponding naming citations for the number range of this particular list. New namings may only be added to this list after official publication, as the preannouncement of names is condemned by the Working Group for Small Bodies Nomenclature of the International Astronomical Union.

Near-Earth obj.	MBA (inner)	MBA (outer)	Centaur
Mars-crosser	MBA (middle)	Jupiter trojan	Trans-Neptunian obj.
Unclassified

== 154001–154100 ==
Designation			Discovery			Properties		Ref
Permanent	Provisional	Named after	Date	Site	Discoverer(s)	Category	Diam.	Ref
154001	2002 AY_{187}	—	January 9, 2002	Haleakala	NEAT	·	2.7 km	MPC · JPL
154002	2002 AD_{193}	—	January 12, 2002	Palomar	NEAT	·	3.5 km	MPC · JPL
154003	2002 AL_{197}	—	January 14, 2002	Socorro	LINEAR	·	2.3 km	MPC · JPL
154004 Haolei	2002 AW_{205}	Haolei	January 13, 2002	Apache Point	SDSS	·	2.7 km	MPC · JPL
154005 Hughharris	2002 AU_{206}	Hughharris	January 13, 2002	Apache Point	SDSS	MAR	1.9 km	MPC · JPL
154006 Suzannehawley	2002 AD_{207}	Suzannehawley	January 13, 2002	Apache Point	SDSS	EUN	1.7 km	MPC · JPL
154007	2002 BY	—	January 19, 2002	Socorro	LINEAR	AMO +1km	840 m	MPC · JPL
154008	2002 BU_{7}	—	January 18, 2002	Socorro	LINEAR	·	4.2 km	MPC · JPL
154009	2002 BE_{16}	—	January 19, 2002	Kitt Peak	Spacewatch	·	3.3 km	MPC · JPL
154010	2002 BZ_{18}	—	January 21, 2002	Socorro	LINEAR	·	3.7 km	MPC · JPL
154011	2002 BC_{19}	—	January 21, 2002	Socorro	LINEAR	·	6.3 km	MPC · JPL
154012	2002 BX_{22}	—	January 23, 2002	Socorro	LINEAR	ADE	3.7 km	MPC · JPL
154013	2002 BP_{24}	—	January 23, 2002	Socorro	LINEAR	EUN	2.4 km	MPC · JPL
154014	2002 BC_{28}	—	January 18, 2002	Cima Ekar	ADAS	·	3.2 km	MPC · JPL
154015	2002 BU_{28}	—	January 19, 2002	Anderson Mesa	LONEOS	(18466)	2.9 km	MPC · JPL
154016	2002 BL_{29}	—	January 20, 2002	Anderson Mesa	LONEOS	·	5.5 km	MPC · JPL
154017	2002 BE_{30}	—	January 21, 2002	Palomar	NEAT	·	3.4 km	MPC · JPL
154018	2002 BS_{30}	—	January 23, 2002	Socorro	LINEAR	·	3.4 km	MPC · JPL
154019	2002 CZ_{9}	—	February 6, 2002	Palomar	NEAT	APO · PHA · critical	140 m	MPC · JPL
154020	2002 CA_{10}	—	February 6, 2002	Palomar	NEAT	APO	530 m	MPC · JPL
154021	2002 CM_{27}	—	February 6, 2002	Socorro	LINEAR	·	2.8 km	MPC · JPL
154022	2002 CX_{28}	—	February 6, 2002	Socorro	LINEAR	·	3.3 km	MPC · JPL
154023	2002 CN_{29}	—	February 6, 2002	Socorro	LINEAR	·	3.2 km	MPC · JPL
154024	2002 CZ_{31}	—	February 6, 2002	Socorro	LINEAR	·	5.3 km	MPC · JPL
154025	2002 CJ_{37}	—	February 7, 2002	Socorro	LINEAR	·	3.6 km	MPC · JPL
154026	2002 CW_{38}	—	February 7, 2002	Socorro	LINEAR	·	3.6 km	MPC · JPL
154027	2002 CU_{42}	—	February 12, 2002	Fountain Hills	C. W. Juels, P. R. Holvorcem	·	4.1 km	MPC · JPL
154028	2002 CV_{42}	—	February 12, 2002	Fountain Hills	C. W. Juels, P. R. Holvorcem	·	3.9 km	MPC · JPL
154029	2002 CY_{46}	—	February 11, 2002	Socorro	LINEAR	AMO · APO +1km	1.1 km	MPC · JPL
154030	2002 CT_{48}	—	February 3, 2002	Haleakala	NEAT	·	3.4 km	MPC · JPL
154031	2002 CM_{49}	—	February 3, 2002	Haleakala	NEAT	·	3.7 km	MPC · JPL
154032	2002 CA_{54}	—	February 7, 2002	Socorro	LINEAR	·	3.4 km	MPC · JPL
154033	2002 CJ_{57}	—	February 7, 2002	Socorro	LINEAR	·	3.7 km	MPC · JPL
154034	2002 CF_{58}	—	February 7, 2002	Kitt Peak	Spacewatch	·	3.4 km	MPC · JPL
154035	2002 CV_{59}	—	February 12, 2002	Kitt Peak	Spacewatch	APO +1km	1.1 km	MPC · JPL
154036	2002 CL_{69}	—	February 7, 2002	Socorro	LINEAR	·	3.0 km	MPC · JPL
154037	2002 CW_{69}	—	February 7, 2002	Socorro	LINEAR	·	2.3 km	MPC · JPL
154038	2002 CY_{73}	—	February 7, 2002	Socorro	LINEAR	KOR	1.7 km	MPC · JPL
154039	2002 CY_{79}	—	February 7, 2002	Socorro	LINEAR	KOR	2.6 km	MPC · JPL
154040	2002 CH_{80}	—	February 7, 2002	Socorro	LINEAR	NEM	3.0 km	MPC · JPL
154041	2002 CK_{86}	—	February 7, 2002	Socorro	LINEAR	AGN	2.0 km	MPC · JPL
154042	2002 CK_{90}	—	February 7, 2002	Socorro	LINEAR	AGN	2.1 km	MPC · JPL
154043	2002 CD_{91}	—	February 7, 2002	Socorro	LINEAR	·	2.5 km	MPC · JPL
154044	2002 CZ_{93}	—	February 7, 2002	Socorro	LINEAR	·	3.4 km	MPC · JPL
154045	2002 CD_{98}	—	February 7, 2002	Socorro	LINEAR	·	3.6 km	MPC · JPL
154046	2002 CX_{104}	—	February 7, 2002	Socorro	LINEAR	KOR	2.7 km	MPC · JPL
154047	2002 CG_{116}	—	February 13, 2002	Desert Eagle	W. K. Y. Yeung	KOR	2.3 km	MPC · JPL
154048	2002 CL_{119}	—	February 7, 2002	Socorro	LINEAR	·	3.8 km	MPC · JPL
154049	2002 CQ_{119}	—	February 7, 2002	Socorro	LINEAR	·	4.8 km	MPC · JPL
154050	2002 CR_{120}	—	February 7, 2002	Socorro	LINEAR	NYS	1.4 km	MPC · JPL
154051	2002 CQ_{121}	—	February 7, 2002	Socorro	LINEAR	GEF	2.3 km	MPC · JPL
154052	2002 CX_{122}	—	February 7, 2002	Socorro	LINEAR	·	2.2 km	MPC · JPL
154053	2002 CX_{129}	—	February 7, 2002	Socorro	LINEAR	GEF	1.8 km	MPC · JPL
154054	2002 CP_{148}	—	February 10, 2002	Socorro	LINEAR	·	3.1 km	MPC · JPL
154055	2002 CW_{150}	—	February 10, 2002	Socorro	LINEAR	·	2.4 km	MPC · JPL
154056	2002 CN_{161}	—	February 8, 2002	Socorro	LINEAR	·	1.6 km	MPC · JPL
154057	2002 CW_{161}	—	February 8, 2002	Socorro	LINEAR	·	3.3 km	MPC · JPL
154058	2002 CX_{161}	—	February 8, 2002	Socorro	LINEAR	·	2.7 km	MPC · JPL
154059	2002 CA_{168}	—	February 8, 2002	Socorro	LINEAR	·	3.7 km	MPC · JPL
154060	2002 CK_{170}	—	February 8, 2002	Socorro	LINEAR	·	3.4 km	MPC · JPL
154061	2002 CO_{175}	—	February 10, 2002	Socorro	LINEAR	·	2.3 km	MPC · JPL
154062	2002 CR_{175}	—	February 10, 2002	Socorro	LINEAR	(5)	4.1 km	MPC · JPL
154063	2002 CV_{176}	—	February 10, 2002	Socorro	LINEAR	·	2.9 km	MPC · JPL
154064	2002 CB_{182}	—	February 10, 2002	Socorro	LINEAR	KOR	1.8 km	MPC · JPL
154065	2002 CG_{182}	—	February 10, 2002	Socorro	LINEAR	·	3.6 km	MPC · JPL
154066	2002 CV_{187}	—	February 10, 2002	Socorro	LINEAR	AST	4.0 km	MPC · JPL
154067	2002 CR_{190}	—	February 10, 2002	Socorro	LINEAR	·	2.7 km	MPC · JPL
154068	2002 CG_{192}	—	February 10, 2002	Socorro	LINEAR	·	3.3 km	MPC · JPL
154069	2002 CX_{197}	—	February 10, 2002	Socorro	LINEAR	AGN	1.9 km	MPC · JPL
154070	2002 CK_{198}	—	February 10, 2002	Socorro	LINEAR	·	4.2 km	MPC · JPL
154071	2002 CS_{198}	—	February 10, 2002	Socorro	LINEAR	WIT	1.5 km	MPC · JPL
154072	2002 CV_{200}	—	February 10, 2002	Socorro	LINEAR	·	2.2 km	MPC · JPL
154073	2002 CH_{208}	—	February 10, 2002	Socorro	LINEAR	·	5.7 km	MPC · JPL
154074	2002 CN_{209}	—	February 10, 2002	Socorro	LINEAR	KOR	2.2 km	MPC · JPL
154075	2002 CZ_{212}	—	February 10, 2002	Socorro	LINEAR	KOR	2.2 km	MPC · JPL
154076	2002 CG_{222}	—	February 11, 2002	Socorro	LINEAR	·	3.2 km	MPC · JPL
154077	2002 CV_{222}	—	February 11, 2002	Socorro	LINEAR	·	3.3 km	MPC · JPL
154078	2002 CO_{223}	—	February 11, 2002	Socorro	LINEAR	(13314)	3.0 km	MPC · JPL
154079	2002 CJ_{224}	—	February 11, 2002	Socorro	LINEAR	·	2.9 km	MPC · JPL
154080	2002 CS_{225}	—	February 7, 2002	Palomar	NEAT	EUN	2.3 km	MPC · JPL
154081	2002 CY_{225}	—	February 3, 2002	Haleakala	NEAT	·	2.1 km	MPC · JPL
154082	2002 CA_{227}	—	February 6, 2002	Palomar	NEAT	EUN	2.5 km	MPC · JPL
154083	2002 CQ_{227}	—	February 6, 2002	Palomar	NEAT	·	4.3 km	MPC · JPL
154084	2002 CD_{233}	—	February 11, 2002	Socorro	LINEAR	·	2.1 km	MPC · JPL
154085	2002 CD_{237}	—	February 10, 2002	Socorro	LINEAR	·	3.4 km	MPC · JPL
154086	2002 CL_{237}	—	February 10, 2002	Socorro	LINEAR	EOS	3.3 km	MPC · JPL
154087	2002 CC_{241}	—	February 11, 2002	Socorro	LINEAR	·	3.3 km	MPC · JPL
154088	2002 CE_{248}	—	February 15, 2002	Socorro	LINEAR	·	5.8 km	MPC · JPL
154089	2002 CD_{279}	—	February 7, 2002	Socorro	LINEAR	·	5.0 km	MPC · JPL
154090	2002 CE_{284}	—	February 9, 2002	Kitt Peak	Spacewatch	·	2.8 km	MPC · JPL
154091	2002 CK_{285}	—	February 10, 2002	Socorro	LINEAR	·	2.6 km	MPC · JPL
154092	2002 CP_{285}	—	February 10, 2002	Kitt Peak	Spacewatch	·	3.4 km	MPC · JPL
154093	2002 CB_{289}	—	February 10, 2002	Kitt Peak	Spacewatch	·	3.5 km	MPC · JPL
154094	2002 CS_{299}	—	February 12, 2002	Kitt Peak	Spacewatch	·	3.9 km	MPC · JPL
154095	2002 CS_{309}	—	February 10, 2002	Socorro	LINEAR	·	1.9 km	MPC · JPL
154096	2002 DE	—	February 16, 2002	Ondřejov	P. Kušnirák, P. Pravec	·	2.6 km	MPC · JPL
154097	2002 DX_{6}	—	February 20, 2002	Kitt Peak	Spacewatch	KOR	1.7 km	MPC · JPL
154098	2002 DK_{13}	—	February 16, 2002	Palomar	NEAT	AGN	1.8 km	MPC · JPL
154099	2002 DN_{16}	—	February 20, 2002	Socorro	LINEAR	HOF	4.1 km	MPC · JPL
154100	2002 DR_{16}	—	February 20, 2002	Socorro	LINEAR	KOR	1.9 km	MPC · JPL

== 154101–154200 ==
back to top

Designation			Discovery			Properties		Ref
Permanent	Provisional	Named after	Date	Site	Discoverer(s)	Category	Diam.	Ref
154101	2002 DW_{17}	—	February 20, 2002	Kitt Peak	Spacewatch	EOS	2.8 km	MPC · JPL
154102	2002 DY_{17}	—	February 20, 2002	Socorro	LINEAR	·	3.4 km	MPC · JPL
154103	2002 EX_{3}	—	March 10, 2002	Cima Ekar	ADAS	·	3.2 km	MPC · JPL
154104	2002 EG_{4}	—	March 10, 2002	Cima Ekar	ADAS	KOR	2.0 km	MPC · JPL
154105	2002 EW_{4}	—	March 10, 2002	Cima Ekar	ADAS	·	2.5 km	MPC · JPL
154106	2002 EK_{8}	—	March 7, 2002	Cima Ekar	ADAS	AST	4.1 km	MPC · JPL
154107	2002 EL_{10}	—	March 15, 2002	Kvistaberg	Uppsala-DLR Asteroid Survey	EOS	3.6 km	MPC · JPL
154108	2002 EJ_{16}	—	March 6, 2002	Palomar	NEAT	·	6.1 km	MPC · JPL
154109	2002 EW_{23}	—	March 5, 2002	Kitt Peak	Spacewatch	KOR	2.0 km	MPC · JPL
154110	2002 EP_{24}	—	March 5, 2002	Kitt Peak	Spacewatch	·	2.5 km	MPC · JPL
154111	2002 EH_{31}	—	March 9, 2002	Socorro	LINEAR	·	4.5 km	MPC · JPL
154112	2002 EA_{34}	—	March 11, 2002	Palomar	NEAT	·	3.3 km	MPC · JPL
154113	2002 EW_{34}	—	March 11, 2002	Palomar	NEAT	·	5.5 km	MPC · JPL
154114	2002 EN_{39}	—	March 9, 2002	Socorro	LINEAR	KOR	2.2 km	MPC · JPL
154115	2002 EE_{40}	—	March 9, 2002	Socorro	LINEAR	·	3.4 km	MPC · JPL
154116	2002 EJ_{56}	—	March 13, 2002	Socorro	LINEAR	·	2.9 km	MPC · JPL
154117	2002 EJ_{58}	—	March 13, 2002	Socorro	LINEAR	HOF	4.8 km	MPC · JPL
154118	2002 EH_{61}	—	March 13, 2002	Socorro	LINEAR	·	2.8 km	MPC · JPL
154119	2002 EN_{61}	—	March 13, 2002	Socorro	LINEAR	TRE	3.8 km	MPC · JPL
154120	2002 EZ_{67}	—	March 13, 2002	Socorro	LINEAR	KOR	2.2 km	MPC · JPL
154121	2002 EL_{72}	—	March 13, 2002	Socorro	LINEAR	·	5.7 km	MPC · JPL
154122	2002 EO_{77}	—	March 11, 2002	Kitt Peak	Spacewatch	KOR	2.1 km	MPC · JPL
154123	2002 EA_{82}	—	March 13, 2002	Palomar	NEAT	·	5.0 km	MPC · JPL
154124	2002 ER_{82}	—	March 13, 2002	Palomar	NEAT	AGN	2.0 km	MPC · JPL
154125	2002 EW_{82}	—	March 13, 2002	Palomar	NEAT	·	2.5 km	MPC · JPL
154126	2002 EG_{84}	—	March 9, 2002	Socorro	LINEAR	·	3.2 km	MPC · JPL
154127	2002 EW_{84}	—	March 9, 2002	Socorro	LINEAR	·	4.8 km	MPC · JPL
154128	2002 EJ_{91}	—	March 12, 2002	Socorro	LINEAR	·	3.4 km	MPC · JPL
154129	2002 EA_{94}	—	March 14, 2002	Socorro	LINEAR	AGN	2.2 km	MPC · JPL
154130	2002 EP_{97}	—	March 12, 2002	Socorro	LINEAR	GEF	2.4 km	MPC · JPL
154131	2002 EK_{102}	—	March 6, 2002	Catalina	CSS	·	3.8 km	MPC · JPL
154132	2002 EL_{107}	—	March 9, 2002	Anderson Mesa	LONEOS	·	3.4 km	MPC · JPL
154133	2002 EM_{107}	—	March 9, 2002	Anderson Mesa	LONEOS	·	5.0 km	MPC · JPL
154134	2002 ET_{111}	—	March 9, 2002	Catalina	CSS	LIX	7.9 km	MPC · JPL
154135	2002 EC_{113}	—	March 10, 2002	Kitt Peak	Spacewatch	KOR	2.7 km	MPC · JPL
154136	2002 ES_{121}	—	March 12, 2002	Kitt Peak	Spacewatch	·	2.9 km	MPC · JPL
154137	2002 ET_{122}	—	March 12, 2002	Anderson Mesa	LONEOS	(1298)	5.1 km	MPC · JPL
154138	2002 EZ_{122}	—	March 12, 2002	Anderson Mesa	LONEOS	·	4.9 km	MPC · JPL
154139	2002 EZ_{138}	—	March 12, 2002	Palomar	NEAT	KOR	2.6 km	MPC · JPL
154140	2002 EY_{151}	—	March 15, 2002	Palomar	NEAT	TEL	2.1 km	MPC · JPL
154141 Kertész	2002 EJ_{160}	Kertész	March 12, 2002	Palomar	K. Sárneczky	·	2.8 km	MPC · JPL
154142	2002 FW	—	March 18, 2002	Desert Eagle	W. K. Y. Yeung	·	4.1 km	MPC · JPL
154143	2002 FJ_{2}	—	March 19, 2002	Desert Eagle	W. K. Y. Yeung	·	5.7 km	MPC · JPL
154144	2002 FA_{5}	—	March 20, 2002	Socorro	LINEAR	AMO +1km	1.1 km	MPC · JPL
154145	2002 FX_{5}	—	March 22, 2002	Eskridge	Farpoint	·	5.1 km	MPC · JPL
154146	2002 FR_{11}	—	March 16, 2002	Haleakala	NEAT	EOS	3.1 km	MPC · JPL
154147	2002 FY_{34}	—	March 20, 2002	Kitt Peak	Spacewatch	HYG	4.8 km	MPC · JPL
154148	2002 FZ_{37}	—	March 30, 2002	Palomar	NEAT	·	3.3 km	MPC · JPL
154149	2002 GS_{1}	—	April 5, 2002	Eskridge	Farpoint	·	8.5 km	MPC · JPL
154150	2002 GP_{3}	—	April 8, 2002	Palomar	NEAT	EUP	5.3 km	MPC · JPL
154151	2002 GQ_{3}	—	April 8, 2002	Palomar	NEAT	THB	4.3 km	MPC · JPL
154152	2002 GX_{3}	—	April 4, 2002	Palomar	NEAT	·	8.4 km	MPC · JPL
154153	2002 GS_{4}	—	April 10, 2002	Socorro	LINEAR	H	1.2 km	MPC · JPL
154154	2002 GB_{11}	—	April 10, 2002	Socorro	LINEAR	H	720 m	MPC · JPL
154155	2002 GS_{11}	—	April 14, 2002	Desert Eagle	W. K. Y. Yeung	·	7.6 km	MPC · JPL
154156	2002 GY_{12}	—	April 14, 2002	Socorro	LINEAR	EMA	6.0 km	MPC · JPL
154157	2002 GW_{21}	—	April 14, 2002	Socorro	LINEAR	·	4.9 km	MPC · JPL
154158	2002 GO_{35}	—	April 2, 2002	Kitt Peak	Spacewatch	KOR	2.2 km	MPC · JPL
154159	2002 GB_{39}	—	April 3, 2002	Palomar	NEAT	EOS	4.0 km	MPC · JPL
154160	2002 GG_{46}	—	April 2, 2002	Palomar	NEAT	·	3.8 km	MPC · JPL
154161	2002 GV_{48}	—	April 4, 2002	Palomar	NEAT	KOR	1.9 km	MPC · JPL
154162	2002 GE_{56}	—	April 5, 2002	Palomar	NEAT	LIX	6.1 km	MPC · JPL
154163	2002 GZ_{56}	—	April 8, 2002	Palomar	NEAT	·	4.4 km	MPC · JPL
154164	2002 GV_{60}	—	April 8, 2002	Palomar	NEAT	·	4.1 km	MPC · JPL
154165	2002 GR_{65}	—	April 8, 2002	Palomar	NEAT	KOR	2.9 km	MPC · JPL
154166	2002 GC_{66}	—	April 8, 2002	Palomar	NEAT	KOR	2.7 km	MPC · JPL
154167	2002 GD_{66}	—	April 8, 2002	Palomar	NEAT	·	4.3 km	MPC · JPL
154168	2002 GH_{67}	—	April 8, 2002	Palomar	NEAT	slow	4.2 km	MPC · JPL
154169	2002 GQ_{67}	—	April 8, 2002	Kitt Peak	Spacewatch	·	3.3 km	MPC · JPL
154170	2002 GH_{68}	—	April 8, 2002	Socorro	LINEAR	TIR	5.8 km	MPC · JPL
154171	2002 GM_{68}	—	April 8, 2002	Socorro	LINEAR	EOS	3.7 km	MPC · JPL
154172	2002 GA_{75}	—	April 9, 2002	Palomar	NEAT	·	4.9 km	MPC · JPL
154173	2002 GL_{78}	—	April 9, 2002	Socorro	LINEAR	·	3.8 km	MPC · JPL
154174	2002 GH_{86}	—	April 10, 2002	Socorro	LINEAR	·	4.8 km	MPC · JPL
154175	2002 GS_{99}	—	April 10, 2002	Socorro	LINEAR	EOS	3.4 km	MPC · JPL
154176	2002 GQ_{102}	—	April 10, 2002	Socorro	LINEAR	TIR	4.8 km	MPC · JPL
154177	2002 GR_{105}	—	April 11, 2002	Anderson Mesa	LONEOS	EUP	6.5 km	MPC · JPL
154178	2002 GW_{105}	—	April 11, 2002	Anderson Mesa	LONEOS	EOS	3.4 km	MPC · JPL
154179	2002 GV_{106}	—	April 11, 2002	Anderson Mesa	LONEOS	EOS	3.3 km	MPC · JPL
154180	2002 GP_{109}	—	April 11, 2002	Palomar	NEAT	·	6.2 km	MPC · JPL
154181	2002 GW_{113}	—	April 11, 2002	Socorro	LINEAR	·	7.0 km	MPC · JPL
154182	2002 GP_{115}	—	April 11, 2002	Socorro	LINEAR	·	4.9 km	MPC · JPL
154183	2002 GJ_{117}	—	April 11, 2002	Socorro	LINEAR	·	4.9 km	MPC · JPL
154184	2002 GN_{117}	—	April 11, 2002	Socorro	LINEAR	·	5.1 km	MPC · JPL
154185	2002 GL_{121}	—	April 10, 2002	Palomar	NEAT	·	3.8 km	MPC · JPL
154186	2002 GV_{121}	—	April 10, 2002	Socorro	LINEAR	AEG	6.3 km	MPC · JPL
154187	2002 GC_{122}	—	April 10, 2002	Socorro	LINEAR	·	3.9 km	MPC · JPL
154188	2002 GL_{123}	—	April 10, 2002	Palomar	NEAT	·	2.6 km	MPC · JPL
154189	2002 GE_{124}	—	April 12, 2002	Socorro	LINEAR	·	3.2 km	MPC · JPL
154190	2002 GP_{124}	—	April 12, 2002	Socorro	LINEAR	·	2.8 km	MPC · JPL
154191	2002 GP_{129}	—	April 12, 2002	Socorro	LINEAR	·	2.8 km	MPC · JPL
154192	2002 GT_{140}	—	April 13, 2002	Palomar	NEAT	·	4.1 km	MPC · JPL
154193	2002 GV_{145}	—	April 12, 2002	Palomar	NEAT	EOS	3.6 km	MPC · JPL
154194	2002 GZ_{145}	—	April 12, 2002	Palomar	NEAT	EOS	3.4 km	MPC · JPL
154195	2002 GP_{147}	—	April 13, 2002	Palomar	NEAT	EOS	3.1 km	MPC · JPL
154196	2002 GD_{152}	—	April 12, 2002	Palomar	NEAT	EOS	2.9 km	MPC · JPL
154197	2002 GB_{154}	—	April 12, 2002	Palomar	NEAT	·	5.5 km	MPC · JPL
154198	2002 GT_{162}	—	April 14, 2002	Palomar	NEAT	·	5.3 km	MPC · JPL
154199	2002 GB_{163}	—	April 14, 2002	Palomar	NEAT	·	1.9 km	MPC · JPL
154200	2002 GH_{170}	—	April 9, 2002	Socorro	LINEAR	·	3.4 km	MPC · JPL

== 154201–154300 ==
back to top

Designation			Discovery			Properties		Ref
Permanent	Provisional	Named after	Date	Site	Discoverer(s)	Category	Diam.	Ref
154201	2002 GQ_{173}	—	April 10, 2002	Socorro	LINEAR	·	4.8 km	MPC · JPL
154202	2002 HK_{3}	—	April 16, 2002	Socorro	LINEAR	·	6.3 km	MPC · JPL
154203	2002 HD_{7}	—	April 18, 2002	Desert Eagle	W. K. Y. Yeung	·	3.9 km	MPC · JPL
154204	2002 HL_{8}	—	April 18, 2002	Socorro	LINEAR	·	7.8 km	MPC · JPL
154205	2002 HX_{13}	—	April 21, 2002	Socorro	LINEAR	H	900 m	MPC · JPL
154206	2002 HD_{16}	—	April 18, 2002	Kitt Peak	Spacewatch	THM	2.8 km	MPC · JPL
154207	2002 JH_{5}	—	May 5, 2002	Desert Eagle	W. K. Y. Yeung	·	5.3 km	MPC · JPL
154208	2002 JS_{21}	—	May 9, 2002	Desert Eagle	W. K. Y. Yeung	·	7.3 km	MPC · JPL
154209	2002 JV_{23}	—	May 8, 2002	Socorro	LINEAR	·	5.2 km	MPC · JPL
154210	2002 JD_{36}	—	May 9, 2002	Socorro	LINEAR	EOS	3.5 km	MPC · JPL
154211	2002 JZ_{36}	—	May 9, 2002	Anderson Mesa	LONEOS	·	6.9 km	MPC · JPL
154212	2002 JL_{37}	—	May 8, 2002	Haleakala	NEAT	EOS	3.8 km	MPC · JPL
154213	2002 JO_{39}	—	May 10, 2002	Desert Eagle	W. K. Y. Yeung	TIR	4.6 km	MPC · JPL
154214	2002 JV_{39}	—	May 10, 2002	Desert Eagle	W. K. Y. Yeung	·	5.4 km	MPC · JPL
154215	2002 JN_{41}	—	May 8, 2002	Socorro	LINEAR	URS	5.7 km	MPC · JPL
154216	2002 JR_{55}	—	May 9, 2002	Socorro	LINEAR	EUP · slow	7.6 km	MPC · JPL
154217	2002 JR_{60}	—	May 10, 2002	Palomar	NEAT	EOS	4.1 km	MPC · JPL
154218	2002 JL_{61}	—	May 8, 2002	Socorro	LINEAR	·	6.6 km	MPC · JPL
154219	2002 JL_{62}	—	May 8, 2002	Socorro	LINEAR	EOS	3.5 km	MPC · JPL
154220	2002 JG_{63}	—	May 9, 2002	Socorro	LINEAR	EOS	3.6 km	MPC · JPL
154221	2002 JS_{64}	—	May 9, 2002	Socorro	LINEAR	·	5.5 km	MPC · JPL
154222	2002 JG_{73}	—	May 8, 2002	Socorro	LINEAR	·	6.8 km	MPC · JPL
154223	2002 JQ_{76}	—	May 11, 2002	Socorro	LINEAR	·	3.7 km	MPC · JPL
154224	2002 JB_{77}	—	May 11, 2002	Socorro	LINEAR	·	4.8 km	MPC · JPL
154225	2002 JF_{78}	—	May 11, 2002	Socorro	LINEAR	·	5.2 km	MPC · JPL
154226	2002 JL_{88}	—	May 11, 2002	Socorro	LINEAR	·	5.3 km	MPC · JPL
154227	2002 JE_{94}	—	May 11, 2002	Socorro	LINEAR	HYG	4.5 km	MPC · JPL
154228	2002 JQ_{95}	—	May 11, 2002	Socorro	LINEAR	·	6.1 km	MPC · JPL
154229	2002 JN_{97}	—	May 13, 2002	Socorro	LINEAR	APO +1km	1.7 km	MPC · JPL
154230	2002 JM_{98}	—	May 11, 2002	Socorro	LINEAR	VER	4.9 km	MPC · JPL
154231	2002 JO_{103}	—	May 10, 2002	Socorro	LINEAR	·	4.4 km	MPC · JPL
154232	2002 JC_{104}	—	May 10, 2002	Socorro	LINEAR	·	6.3 km	MPC · JPL
154233	2002 JL_{109}	—	May 11, 2002	Socorro	LINEAR	·	3.8 km	MPC · JPL
154234	2002 JP_{109}	—	May 11, 2002	Socorro	LINEAR	·	6.1 km	MPC · JPL
154235	2002 JZ_{118}	—	May 5, 2002	Palomar	NEAT	·	5.1 km	MPC · JPL
154236	2002 JM_{122}	—	May 6, 2002	Socorro	LINEAR	·	5.0 km	MPC · JPL
154237	2002 JA_{123}	—	May 6, 2002	Palomar	NEAT	EOS	3.5 km	MPC · JPL
154238	2002 JF_{123}	—	May 6, 2002	Palomar	NEAT	·	5.6 km	MPC · JPL
154239	2002 JW_{133}	—	May 9, 2002	Socorro	LINEAR	HYG	5.3 km	MPC · JPL
154240	2002 JW_{139}	—	May 10, 2002	Palomar	NEAT	·	5.0 km	MPC · JPL
154241	2002 JD_{146}	—	May 15, 2002	Socorro	LINEAR	·	6.4 km	MPC · JPL
154242	2002 KR_{2}	—	May 18, 2002	Palomar	NEAT	·	3.6 km	MPC · JPL
154243	2002 KA_{6}	—	May 18, 2002	Socorro	LINEAR	·	5.2 km	MPC · JPL
154244	2002 KL_{6}	—	May 27, 2002	Haleakala	NEAT	AMO +1km	1.1 km	MPC · JPL
154245	2002 KA_{8}	—	May 29, 2002	Palomar	NEAT	LUT	8.1 km	MPC · JPL
154246	2002 KB_{8}	—	May 29, 2002	Palomar	NEAT	·	5.5 km	MPC · JPL
154247	2002 KF_{8}	—	May 29, 2002	Haleakala	NEAT	·	6.4 km	MPC · JPL
154248	2002 KE_{10}	—	May 16, 2002	Socorro	LINEAR	·	4.9 km	MPC · JPL
154249	2002 KQ_{11}	—	May 17, 2002	Palomar	NEAT	·	5.0 km	MPC · JPL
154250	2002 KY_{13}	—	May 21, 2002	Socorro	LINEAR	HYG	4.8 km	MPC · JPL
154251	2002 LB_{5}	—	June 4, 2002	Palomar	NEAT	fast	7.2 km	MPC · JPL
154252	2002 LP_{5}	—	June 6, 2002	Kitt Peak	Spacewatch	·	3.3 km	MPC · JPL
154253	2002 LH_{39}	—	June 10, 2002	Socorro	LINEAR	·	5.3 km	MPC · JPL
154254	2002 LD_{40}	—	June 10, 2002	Socorro	LINEAR	·	5.1 km	MPC · JPL
154255	2002 LA_{45}	—	June 5, 2002	Anderson Mesa	LONEOS	EOS	3.9 km	MPC · JPL
154256	2002 LV_{55}	—	June 14, 2002	Socorro	LINEAR	·	5.3 km	MPC · JPL
154257	2002 LD_{56}	—	June 15, 2002	Socorro	LINEAR	·	10 km	MPC · JPL
154258	2002 NN_{7}	—	July 5, 2002	Socorro	LINEAR	H	930 m	MPC · JPL
154259	2002 NY_{55}	—	July 12, 2002	Palomar	NEAT	ERI	2.9 km	MPC · JPL
154260	2002 PZ	—	August 1, 2002	Socorro	LINEAR	H	1.1 km	MPC · JPL
154261	2002 RZ_{8}	—	September 4, 2002	Palomar	NEAT	NYS	1.6 km	MPC · JPL
154262	2002 RW_{12}	—	September 4, 2002	Anderson Mesa	LONEOS	T_{j} (2.98) · 3:2	8.9 km	MPC · JPL
154263	2002 RM_{39}	—	September 5, 2002	Socorro	LINEAR	3:2	5.0 km	MPC · JPL
154264	2002 RP_{42}	—	September 5, 2002	Socorro	LINEAR	T_{j} (2.97) · HIL · 3:2	9.4 km	MPC · JPL
154265	2002 RX_{91}	—	September 5, 2002	Socorro	LINEAR	(5)	1.4 km	MPC · JPL
154266	2002 RQ_{100}	—	September 5, 2002	Socorro	LINEAR	·	1.7 km	MPC · JPL
154267	2002 RK_{107}	—	September 5, 2002	Socorro	LINEAR	·	6.4 km	MPC · JPL
154268	2002 RM_{129}	—	September 9, 2002	Palomar	NEAT	APO +1km	870 m	MPC · JPL
154269	2002 SM	—	September 16, 2002	Palomar	NEAT	APO +1km · PHA	950 m	MPC · JPL
154270	2002 SG_{5}	—	September 27, 2002	Palomar	NEAT	·	920 m	MPC · JPL
154271	2002 SZ_{17}	—	September 26, 2002	Palomar	NEAT	·	1.7 km	MPC · JPL
154272	2002 SE_{31}	—	September 28, 2002	Haleakala	NEAT	·	1.1 km	MPC · JPL
154273	2002 SK_{37}	—	September 29, 2002	Haleakala	NEAT	·	1.3 km	MPC · JPL
154274	2002 SX_{38}	—	September 30, 2002	Socorro	LINEAR	·	1.1 km	MPC · JPL
154275	2002 SR_{41}	—	September 30, 2002	Socorro	LINEAR	APO · PHA	330 m	MPC · JPL
154276	2002 SY_{50}	—	September 30, 2002	Socorro	LINEAR	APO +1km · PHA	1.1 km	MPC · JPL
154277	2002 SD_{56}	—	September 30, 2002	Socorro	LINEAR	MAR	1.3 km	MPC · JPL
154278	2002 TB_{9}	—	October 2, 2002	Socorro	LINEAR	APO +1km	1.8 km	MPC · JPL
154279	2002 TO_{38}	—	October 2, 2002	Socorro	LINEAR	·	1.2 km	MPC · JPL
154280	2002 TS_{39}	—	October 2, 2002	Socorro	LINEAR	·	1.5 km	MPC · JPL
154281	2002 TF_{42}	—	October 2, 2002	Socorro	LINEAR	·	2.9 km	MPC · JPL
154282	2002 TM_{46}	—	October 2, 2002	Socorro	LINEAR	·	1.3 km	MPC · JPL
154283	2002 TD_{52}	—	October 2, 2002	Socorro	LINEAR	·	1.2 km	MPC · JPL
154284	2002 TG_{52}	—	October 2, 2002	Socorro	LINEAR	·	1.4 km	MPC · JPL
154285	2002 TY_{54}	—	October 2, 2002	Socorro	LINEAR	·	1.3 km	MPC · JPL
154286	2002 TO_{81}	—	October 1, 2002	Haleakala	NEAT	·	2.1 km	MPC · JPL
154287	2002 TE_{101}	—	October 4, 2002	Socorro	LINEAR	·	910 m	MPC · JPL
154288	2002 TR_{118}	—	October 3, 2002	Palomar	NEAT	·	1.0 km	MPC · JPL
154289	2002 TY_{127}	—	October 4, 2002	Palomar	NEAT	·	1.2 km	MPC · JPL
154290	2002 TA_{208}	—	October 4, 2002	Socorro	LINEAR	·	1.6 km	MPC · JPL
154291	2002 TT_{249}	—	October 7, 2002	Socorro	LINEAR	·	1.2 km	MPC · JPL
154292	2002 TJ_{258}	—	October 9, 2002	Socorro	LINEAR	·	1.1 km	MPC · JPL
154293	2002 TF_{260}	—	October 9, 2002	Socorro	LINEAR	·	1.2 km	MPC · JPL
154294	2002 TG_{280}	—	October 10, 2002	Socorro	LINEAR	·	1.5 km	MPC · JPL
154295	2002 TT_{285}	—	October 10, 2002	Socorro	LINEAR	·	1.5 km	MPC · JPL
154296	2002 TG_{287}	—	October 10, 2002	Socorro	LINEAR	·	1.0 km	MPC · JPL
154297	2002 TW_{288}	—	October 10, 2002	Socorro	LINEAR	·	1.5 km	MPC · JPL
154298	2002 TH_{289}	—	October 10, 2002	Socorro	LINEAR	·	1.3 km	MPC · JPL
154299	2002 TF_{294}	—	October 11, 2002	Socorro	LINEAR	·	1.0 km	MPC · JPL
154300	2002 UO	—	October 22, 2002	Palomar	NEAT	APO	470 m	MPC · JPL

== 154301–154400 ==
back to top

Designation			Discovery			Properties		Ref
Permanent	Provisional	Named after	Date	Site	Discoverer(s)	Category	Diam.	Ref
154301	2002 UZ_{1}	—	October 26, 2002	Haleakala	NEAT	·	1.1 km	MPC · JPL
154302	2002 UQ_{3}	—	October 29, 2002	Fountain Hills	C. W. Juels, P. R. Holvorcem	APO +1km · PHA	1.0 km	MPC · JPL
154303	2002 UW_{20}	—	October 28, 2002	Haleakala	NEAT	·	2.3 km	MPC · JPL
154304	2002 UG_{32}	—	October 30, 2002	Haleakala	NEAT	·	1.1 km	MPC · JPL
154305	2002 UM_{32}	—	October 30, 2002	Haleakala	NEAT	·	2.2 km	MPC · JPL
154306	2002 UV_{32}	—	October 30, 2002	Kvistaberg	Uppsala-DLR Asteroid Survey	·	830 m	MPC · JPL
154307	2002 UX_{48}	—	October 31, 2002	Socorro	LINEAR	·	2.2 km	MPC · JPL
154308	2002 VC_{2}	—	November 2, 2002	Kitt Peak	Spacewatch	NYS	1.5 km	MPC · JPL
154309	2002 VZ_{5}	—	November 4, 2002	Palomar	NEAT	·	1.4 km	MPC · JPL
154310	2002 VZ_{6}	—	November 1, 2002	Palomar	NEAT	·	1.1 km	MPC · JPL
154311	2002 VU_{16}	—	November 5, 2002	Socorro	LINEAR	(2076)	1.2 km	MPC · JPL
154312	2002 VX_{18}	—	November 4, 2002	Palomar	NEAT	·	1.2 km	MPC · JPL
154313	2002 VF_{19}	—	November 4, 2002	Palomar	NEAT	·	1.9 km	MPC · JPL
154314	2002 VB_{20}	—	November 4, 2002	Kitt Peak	Spacewatch	·	1.0 km	MPC · JPL
154315	2002 VO_{20}	—	November 5, 2002	Anderson Mesa	LONEOS	·	1.2 km	MPC · JPL
154316	2002 VM_{22}	—	November 5, 2002	Socorro	LINEAR	·	2.3 km	MPC · JPL
154317	2002 VW_{22}	—	November 5, 2002	Socorro	LINEAR	·	2.6 km	MPC · JPL
154318	2002 VM_{23}	—	November 5, 2002	Socorro	LINEAR	·	860 m	MPC · JPL
154319	2002 VM_{27}	—	November 5, 2002	Palomar	NEAT	·	2.1 km	MPC · JPL
154320	2002 VO_{28}	—	November 5, 2002	Anderson Mesa	LONEOS	·	1.1 km	MPC · JPL
154321	2002 VE_{34}	—	November 5, 2002	Socorro	LINEAR	·	1.7 km	MPC · JPL
154322	2002 VF_{45}	—	November 5, 2002	Socorro	LINEAR	·	1.6 km	MPC · JPL
154323	2002 VP_{47}	—	November 5, 2002	Socorro	LINEAR	·	1.2 km	MPC · JPL
154324	2002 VS_{48}	—	November 5, 2002	Socorro	LINEAR	·	3.6 km	MPC · JPL
154325	2002 VW_{63}	—	November 6, 2002	Anderson Mesa	LONEOS	·	1.0 km	MPC · JPL
154326	2002 VP_{64}	—	November 6, 2002	Haleakala	NEAT	·	1.9 km	MPC · JPL
154327	2002 VP_{65}	—	November 7, 2002	Socorro	LINEAR	·	1.1 km	MPC · JPL
154328	2002 VM_{80}	—	November 7, 2002	Socorro	LINEAR	·	1.2 km	MPC · JPL
154329	2002 VA_{92}	—	November 12, 2002	Socorro	LINEAR	·	1.4 km	MPC · JPL
154330	2002 VX_{94}	—	November 14, 2002	Palomar	NEAT	APO +1km · PHA	820 m	MPC · JPL
154331	2002 VF_{95}	—	November 14, 2002	Socorro	LINEAR	·	1.3 km	MPC · JPL
154332	2002 VO_{97}	—	November 12, 2002	Socorro	LINEAR	·	1.6 km	MPC · JPL
154333	2002 VW_{97}	—	November 12, 2002	Socorro	LINEAR	·	970 m	MPC · JPL
154334	2002 VW_{101}	—	November 11, 2002	Socorro	LINEAR	·	2.3 km	MPC · JPL
154335	2002 VH_{105}	—	November 12, 2002	Socorro	LINEAR	·	1.4 km	MPC · JPL
154336	2002 VA_{112}	—	November 13, 2002	Socorro	LINEAR	·	1 km	MPC · JPL
154337	2002 VV_{121}	—	November 13, 2002	Palomar	NEAT	·	4.1 km	MPC · JPL
154338	2002 VJ_{126}	—	November 12, 2002	Socorro	LINEAR	·	1.3 km	MPC · JPL
154339	2002 WM	—	November 18, 2002	Palomar	NEAT	·	3.1 km	MPC · JPL
154340	2002 WN_{1}	—	November 23, 2002	Palomar	NEAT	·	1.8 km	MPC · JPL
154341	2002 WQ_{1}	—	November 23, 2002	Palomar	NEAT	·	1.2 km	MPC · JPL
154342	2002 WK_{7}	—	November 24, 2002	Palomar	NEAT	·	1.3 km	MPC · JPL
154343	2002 WT_{9}	—	November 24, 2002	Palomar	NEAT	·	1.7 km	MPC · JPL
154344	2002 WN_{10}	—	November 24, 2002	Palomar	NEAT	·	1.2 km	MPC · JPL
154345	2002 WS_{18}	—	November 29, 2002	Emerald Lane	L. Ball	·	1.2 km	MPC · JPL
154346	2002 XP	—	December 1, 2002	Socorro	LINEAR	·	1.0 km	MPC · JPL
154347	2002 XK_{4}	—	December 4, 2002	Socorro	LINEAR	APO +1km	2.1 km	MPC · JPL
154348	2002 XB_{14}	—	December 1, 2002	Haleakala	NEAT	·	1.4 km	MPC · JPL
154349	2002 XH_{17}	—	December 5, 2002	Kitt Peak	Spacewatch	·	1.1 km	MPC · JPL
154350	2002 XX_{18}	—	December 5, 2002	Socorro	LINEAR	·	2.3 km	MPC · JPL
154351	2002 XG_{24}	—	December 5, 2002	Socorro	LINEAR	·	1.3 km	MPC · JPL
154352	2002 XB_{26}	—	December 5, 2002	Socorro	LINEAR	·	1.2 km	MPC · JPL
154353	2002 XF_{26}	—	December 6, 2002	Socorro	LINEAR	·	1.2 km	MPC · JPL
154354	2002 XP_{26}	—	December 3, 2002	Palomar	NEAT	·	1.5 km	MPC · JPL
154355	2002 XU_{32}	—	December 6, 2002	Socorro	LINEAR	LEO	5.1 km	MPC · JPL
154356	2002 XE_{36}	—	December 5, 2002	Socorro	LINEAR	·	960 m	MPC · JPL
154357	2002 XO_{44}	—	December 7, 2002	Socorro	LINEAR	·	1.9 km	MPC · JPL
154358	2002 XM_{47}	—	December 9, 2002	Desert Eagle	W. K. Y. Yeung	·	1.2 km	MPC · JPL
154359	2002 XZ_{48}	—	December 10, 2002	Socorro	LINEAR	·	1.1 km	MPC · JPL
154360	2002 XU_{54}	—	December 10, 2002	Palomar	NEAT	NYS	1.5 km	MPC · JPL
154361	2002 XH_{55}	—	December 10, 2002	Palomar	NEAT	·	1.8 km	MPC · JPL
154362	2002 XV_{58}	—	December 11, 2002	Socorro	LINEAR	·	2.0 km	MPC · JPL
154363	2002 XB_{61}	—	December 10, 2002	Socorro	LINEAR	·	1.7 km	MPC · JPL
154364	2002 XM_{62}	—	December 11, 2002	Socorro	LINEAR	NYS	2.7 km	MPC · JPL
154365	2002 XS_{63}	—	December 11, 2002	Socorro	LINEAR	·	3.6 km	MPC · JPL
154366	2002 XS_{68}	—	December 11, 2002	Socorro	LINEAR	·	1.5 km	MPC · JPL
154367	2002 XE_{71}	—	December 10, 2002	Socorro	LINEAR	·	1.5 km	MPC · JPL
154368	2002 XJ_{72}	—	December 11, 2002	Socorro	LINEAR	·	1.6 km	MPC · JPL
154369	2002 XX_{77}	—	December 11, 2002	Socorro	LINEAR	·	1.4 km	MPC · JPL
154370	2002 XY_{78}	—	December 11, 2002	Socorro	LINEAR	·	1.5 km	MPC · JPL
154371	2002 XR_{83}	—	December 13, 2002	Palomar	NEAT	·	1.5 km	MPC · JPL
154372	2002 XM_{84}	—	December 12, 2002	Palomar	NEAT	·	2.5 km	MPC · JPL
154373	2002 XQ_{84}	—	December 11, 2002	Socorro	LINEAR	·	950 m	MPC · JPL
154374	2002 XK_{85}	—	December 11, 2002	Socorro	LINEAR	·	1.5 km	MPC · JPL
154375	2002 XO_{86}	—	December 11, 2002	Socorro	LINEAR	·	2.7 km	MPC · JPL
154376	2002 XC_{110}	—	December 6, 2002	Socorro	LINEAR	·	2.0 km	MPC · JPL
154377	2002 XC_{113}	—	December 6, 2002	Socorro	LINEAR	NYS	1.5 km	MPC · JPL
154378 Hennessy	2002 XR_{115}	Hennessy	December 14, 2002	Apache Point	SDSS	MAS	1.4 km	MPC · JPL
154379	2002 YD_{8}	—	December 28, 2002	Kitt Peak	Spacewatch	·	2.1 km	MPC · JPL
154380	2002 YJ_{17}	—	December 31, 2002	Socorro	LINEAR	·	1.0 km	MPC · JPL
154381	2002 YN_{26}	—	December 31, 2002	Socorro	LINEAR	MAS	1.4 km	MPC · JPL
154382	2002 YS_{26}	—	December 31, 2002	Socorro	LINEAR	·	1.5 km	MPC · JPL
154383	2002 YA_{27}	—	December 31, 2002	Socorro	LINEAR	·	2.6 km	MPC · JPL
154384	2002 YG_{29}	—	December 31, 2002	Socorro	LINEAR	·	2.3 km	MPC · JPL
154385	2003 AS_{6}	—	January 2, 2003	Kitt Peak	Spacewatch	·	1.4 km	MPC · JPL
154386	2003 AU_{9}	—	January 4, 2003	Socorro	LINEAR	·	1.5 km	MPC · JPL
154387	2003 AQ_{11}	—	January 1, 2003	Socorro	LINEAR	·	2.5 km	MPC · JPL
154388	2003 AH_{17}	—	January 5, 2003	Socorro	LINEAR	·	2.3 km	MPC · JPL
154389	2003 AT_{18}	—	January 3, 2003	Kitt Peak	Spacewatch	·	1.6 km	MPC · JPL
154390	2003 AE_{19}	—	January 4, 2003	Socorro	LINEAR	·	1.4 km	MPC · JPL
154391	2003 AQ_{20}	—	January 5, 2003	Socorro	LINEAR	·	1.7 km	MPC · JPL
154392	2003 AR_{28}	—	January 4, 2003	Socorro	LINEAR	NYS	1.3 km	MPC · JPL
154393	2003 AV_{28}	—	January 4, 2003	Socorro	LINEAR	·	1.7 km	MPC · JPL
154394	2003 AC_{30}	—	January 4, 2003	Socorro	LINEAR	·	1.5 km	MPC · JPL
154395	2003 AG_{30}	—	January 4, 2003	Socorro	LINEAR	·	3.3 km	MPC · JPL
154396	2003 AT_{33}	—	January 5, 2003	Socorro	LINEAR	NYS	1.7 km	MPC · JPL
154397	2003 AE_{38}	—	January 7, 2003	Socorro	LINEAR	·	1.3 km	MPC · JPL
154398	2003 AL_{40}	—	January 7, 2003	Socorro	LINEAR	·	1.6 km	MPC · JPL
154399	2003 AP_{41}	—	January 7, 2003	Socorro	LINEAR	·	1.8 km	MPC · JPL
154400	2003 AG_{50}	—	January 5, 2003	Socorro	LINEAR	·	2.8 km	MPC · JPL

== 154401–154500 ==
back to top

Designation			Discovery			Properties		Ref
Permanent	Provisional	Named after	Date	Site	Discoverer(s)	Category	Diam.	Ref
154401	2003 AP_{52}	—	January 5, 2003	Socorro	LINEAR	·	1.5 km	MPC · JPL
154402	2003 AB_{53}	—	January 5, 2003	Socorro	LINEAR	NYS	1.7 km	MPC · JPL
154403	2003 AM_{54}	—	January 5, 2003	Socorro	LINEAR	NYS	1.8 km	MPC · JPL
154404	2003 AU_{56}	—	January 5, 2003	Socorro	LINEAR	·	1.6 km	MPC · JPL
154405	2003 AK_{57}	—	January 5, 2003	Socorro	LINEAR	·	2.1 km	MPC · JPL
154406	2003 AX_{58}	—	January 5, 2003	Socorro	LINEAR	·	1.9 km	MPC · JPL
154407	2003 AB_{59}	—	January 5, 2003	Socorro	LINEAR	·	2.2 km	MPC · JPL
154408	2003 AJ_{75}	—	January 10, 2003	Socorro	LINEAR	HNS	2.1 km	MPC · JPL
154409	2003 AN_{75}	—	January 10, 2003	Socorro	LINEAR	·	1.7 km	MPC · JPL
154410	2003 AY_{77}	—	January 10, 2003	Socorro	LINEAR	·	2.9 km	MPC · JPL
154411	2003 AR_{82}	—	January 11, 2003	Socorro	LINEAR	·	1.5 km	MPC · JPL
154412	2003 AX_{82}	—	January 8, 2003	Bergisch Gladbach	W. Bickel	·	1.5 km	MPC · JPL
154413	2003 BQ_{8}	—	January 26, 2003	Anderson Mesa	LONEOS	·	1.7 km	MPC · JPL
154414	2003 BH_{12}	—	January 26, 2003	Anderson Mesa	LONEOS	NYS	2.2 km	MPC · JPL
154415	2003 BQ_{19}	—	January 26, 2003	Haleakala	NEAT	SUL	3.3 km	MPC · JPL
154416	2003 BF_{21}	—	January 27, 2003	Anderson Mesa	LONEOS	·	1.8 km	MPC · JPL
154417	2003 BO_{25}	—	January 26, 2003	Palomar	NEAT	L5	20 km	MPC · JPL
154418	2003 BR_{26}	—	January 26, 2003	Anderson Mesa	LONEOS	NYS	1.8 km	MPC · JPL
154419	2003 BH_{27}	—	January 26, 2003	Anderson Mesa	LONEOS	·	2.2 km	MPC · JPL
154420	2003 BB_{31}	—	January 27, 2003	Socorro	LINEAR	NYS	1.8 km	MPC · JPL
154421	2003 BO_{33}	—	January 27, 2003	Haleakala	NEAT	·	3.2 km	MPC · JPL
154422	2003 BO_{36}	—	January 27, 2003	Socorro	LINEAR	·	1.9 km	MPC · JPL
154423	2003 BW_{40}	—	January 28, 2003	Socorro	LINEAR	·	2.1 km	MPC · JPL
154424	2003 BM_{42}	—	January 28, 2003	Socorro	LINEAR	·	2.2 km	MPC · JPL
154425	2003 BQ_{44}	—	January 27, 2003	Socorro	LINEAR	NYS	1.8 km	MPC · JPL
154426	2003 BE_{47}	—	January 29, 2003	Palomar	NEAT	·	1.8 km	MPC · JPL
154427	2003 BC_{48}	—	January 27, 2003	Anderson Mesa	LONEOS	NYS	1.9 km	MPC · JPL
154428	2003 BE_{48}	—	January 27, 2003	Anderson Mesa	LONEOS	·	2.5 km	MPC · JPL
154429	2003 BY_{49}	—	January 27, 2003	Socorro	LINEAR	V	1.2 km	MPC · JPL
154430	2003 BX_{50}	—	January 27, 2003	Socorro	LINEAR	·	1.5 km	MPC · JPL
154431	2003 BN_{51}	—	January 27, 2003	Socorro	LINEAR	MAS	1.4 km	MPC · JPL
154432	2003 BP_{51}	—	January 27, 2003	Socorro	LINEAR	NYS	1.9 km	MPC · JPL
154433	2003 BE_{55}	—	January 27, 2003	Haleakala	NEAT	NYS	2.3 km	MPC · JPL
154434	2003 BC_{56}	—	January 28, 2003	Haleakala	NEAT	·	1.4 km	MPC · JPL
154435	2003 BO_{57}	—	January 27, 2003	Socorro	LINEAR	·	2.5 km	MPC · JPL
154436	2003 BD_{66}	—	January 30, 2003	Kitt Peak	Spacewatch	NYS ·	2.1 km	MPC · JPL
154437	2003 BX_{67}	—	January 27, 2003	Socorro	LINEAR	NYS	1.2 km	MPC · JPL
154438	2003 BM_{77}	—	January 30, 2003	Anderson Mesa	LONEOS	·	2.2 km	MPC · JPL
154439	2003 BW_{77}	—	January 30, 2003	Anderson Mesa	LONEOS	·	2.2 km	MPC · JPL
154440	2003 BO_{79}	—	January 31, 2003	Anderson Mesa	LONEOS	·	2.0 km	MPC · JPL
154441	2003 BV_{80}	—	January 30, 2003	Anderson Mesa	LONEOS	·	1.9 km	MPC · JPL
154442	2003 BS_{82}	—	January 31, 2003	Socorro	LINEAR	·	1.8 km	MPC · JPL
154443	2003 BX_{82}	—	January 31, 2003	Socorro	LINEAR	MAS	1.1 km	MPC · JPL
154444	2003 BF_{83}	—	January 31, 2003	Socorro	LINEAR	·	1.9 km	MPC · JPL
154445	2003 BQ_{84}	—	January 30, 2003	Haleakala	NEAT	·	2.1 km	MPC · JPL
154446	2003 CY_{1}	—	February 1, 2003	Kitt Peak	Spacewatch	·	1.4 km	MPC · JPL
154447	2003 CZ_{1}	—	February 1, 2003	Socorro	LINEAR	NYS	1.8 km	MPC · JPL
154448	2003 CT_{4}	—	February 1, 2003	Socorro	LINEAR	·	3.4 km	MPC · JPL
154449	2003 CY_{5}	—	February 1, 2003	Anderson Mesa	LONEOS	·	2.1 km	MPC · JPL
154450	2003 CE_{6}	—	February 1, 2003	Socorro	LINEAR	·	2.1 km	MPC · JPL
154451	2003 CN_{9}	—	February 2, 2003	Socorro	LINEAR	·	1.8 km	MPC · JPL
154452	2003 CO_{10}	—	February 3, 2003	Socorro	LINEAR	·	1.7 km	MPC · JPL
154453	2003 CJ_{11}	—	February 3, 2003	Anderson Mesa	LONEOS	T_{j} (2.74) · APO +1km	3.0 km	MPC · JPL
154454	2003 CG_{12}	—	February 2, 2003	Palomar	NEAT	MAS	900 m	MPC · JPL
154455	2003 CL_{12}	—	February 2, 2003	Palomar	NEAT	V	1.0 km	MPC · JPL
154456	2003 CE_{18}	—	February 8, 2003	Socorro	LINEAR	·	1.9 km	MPC · JPL
154457	2003 CK_{19}	—	February 8, 2003	Socorro	LINEAR	NYS ·	1.4 km	MPC · JPL
154458	2003 CU_{19}	—	February 8, 2003	Socorro	LINEAR	NYS	1.7 km	MPC · JPL
154459	2003 DJ_{1}	—	February 21, 2003	Palomar	NEAT	·	1.8 km	MPC · JPL
154460	2003 DO_{1}	—	February 21, 2003	Palomar	NEAT	NYS	2.8 km	MPC · JPL
154461	2003 DU_{5}	—	February 19, 2003	Palomar	NEAT	·	2.6 km	MPC · JPL
154462	2003 DC_{6}	—	February 22, 2003	Kitt Peak	Spacewatch	·	1.8 km	MPC · JPL
154463	2003 DL_{6}	—	February 24, 2003	Modra	Gajdoš, S.	·	1.9 km	MPC · JPL
154464	2003 DU_{12}	—	February 26, 2003	Campo Imperatore	CINEOS	MAS	880 m	MPC · JPL
154465	2003 DB_{13}	—	February 22, 2003	Palomar	NEAT	·	1.7 km	MPC · JPL
154466	2003 DO_{15}	—	February 26, 2003	Haleakala	NEAT	·	6.1 km	MPC · JPL
154467	2003 DR_{15}	—	February 27, 2003	Haleakala	NEAT	·	1.7 km	MPC · JPL
154468	2003 DG_{17}	—	February 28, 2003	Kleť	Kleť	·	2.2 km	MPC · JPL
154469	2003 DR_{17}	—	February 22, 2003	Goodricke-Pigott	Kessel, J. W.	·	2.8 km	MPC · JPL
154470	2003 DP_{19}	—	February 22, 2003	Palomar	NEAT	·	1.7 km	MPC · JPL
154471	2003 DX_{20}	—	February 22, 2003	Palomar	NEAT	·	2.0 km	MPC · JPL
154472	2003 DD_{24}	—	February 22, 2003	Palomar	NEAT	·	2.2 km	MPC · JPL
154473	2003 DM_{24}	—	February 22, 2003	Kitt Peak	Spacewatch	MAS	820 m	MPC · JPL
154474	2003 EJ_{2}	—	March 5, 2003	Socorro	LINEAR	MAS	1.4 km	MPC · JPL
154475	2003 EU_{2}	—	March 5, 2003	Socorro	LINEAR	MAS	1.1 km	MPC · JPL
154476	2003 EX_{3}	—	March 6, 2003	Palomar	NEAT	·	2.2 km	MPC · JPL
154477	2003 EW_{5}	—	March 5, 2003	Socorro	LINEAR	NYS	2.2 km	MPC · JPL
154478	2003 EJ_{10}	—	March 6, 2003	Socorro	LINEAR	·	2.6 km	MPC · JPL
154479	2003 ET_{10}	—	March 6, 2003	Socorro	LINEAR	·	2.2 km	MPC · JPL
154480	2003 ED_{18}	—	March 6, 2003	Anderson Mesa	LONEOS	·	3.6 km	MPC · JPL
154481	2003 EB_{24}	—	March 6, 2003	Socorro	LINEAR	·	1.8 km	MPC · JPL
154482	2003 EX_{25}	—	March 6, 2003	Anderson Mesa	LONEOS	CLA	3.3 km	MPC · JPL
154483	2003 EO_{28}	—	March 6, 2003	Socorro	LINEAR	·	5.7 km	MPC · JPL
154484	2003 EB_{31}	—	March 6, 2003	Palomar	NEAT	·	1.7 km	MPC · JPL
154485	2003 EZ_{32}	—	March 7, 2003	Anderson Mesa	LONEOS	·	2.1 km	MPC · JPL
154486	2003 EJ_{33}	—	March 7, 2003	Anderson Mesa	LONEOS	·	2.4 km	MPC · JPL
154487	2003 EZ_{35}	—	March 7, 2003	Anderson Mesa	LONEOS	·	2.6 km	MPC · JPL
154488	2003 EL_{36}	—	March 7, 2003	Anderson Mesa	LONEOS	·	2.2 km	MPC · JPL
154489	2003 EN_{51}	—	March 7, 2003	Goodricke-Pigott	R. A. Tucker	BAR	1.8 km	MPC · JPL
154490	2003 EQ_{60}	—	March 15, 2003	Haleakala	NEAT	·	3.2 km	MPC · JPL
154491	2003 FM_{2}	—	March 24, 2003	Cordell-Lorenz	Cordell-Lorenz	·	1.6 km	MPC · JPL
154492	2003 FD_{4}	—	March 26, 2003	Palomar	NEAT	·	3.0 km	MPC · JPL
154493 Portisch	2003 FU_{6}	Portisch	March 27, 2003	Piszkéstető	K. Sárneczky	·	2.1 km	MPC · JPL
154494	2003 FL_{10}	—	March 23, 2003	Kitt Peak	Spacewatch	NYS	2.3 km	MPC · JPL
154495	2003 FU_{15}	—	March 23, 2003	Palomar	NEAT	EUN	1.9 km	MPC · JPL
154496	2003 FK_{18}	—	March 24, 2003	Kitt Peak	Spacewatch	NYS	2.2 km	MPC · JPL
154497	2003 FD_{21}	—	March 23, 2003	Haleakala	NEAT	EUN	1.9 km	MPC · JPL
154498	2003 FT_{24}	—	March 24, 2003	Kitt Peak	Spacewatch	·	1.9 km	MPC · JPL
154499	2003 FX_{26}	—	March 24, 2003	Kitt Peak	Spacewatch	NYS	2.0 km	MPC · JPL
154500	2003 FZ_{26}	—	March 24, 2003	Kitt Peak	Spacewatch	·	2.4 km	MPC · JPL

== 154501–154600 ==
back to top

Designation			Discovery			Properties		Ref
Permanent	Provisional	Named after	Date	Site	Discoverer(s)	Category	Diam.	Ref
154501	2003 FR_{30}	—	March 25, 2003	Haleakala	NEAT	GEF	2.3 km	MPC · JPL
154502	2003 FV_{30}	—	March 30, 2003	Socorro	LINEAR	·	3.6 km	MPC · JPL
154503	2003 FQ_{35}	—	March 23, 2003	Kitt Peak	Spacewatch	·	1.9 km	MPC · JPL
154504	2003 FF_{40}	—	March 24, 2003	Kitt Peak	Spacewatch	·	2.6 km	MPC · JPL
154505	2003 FM_{41}	—	March 25, 2003	Palomar	NEAT	PHO	2.1 km	MPC · JPL
154506	2003 FC_{42}	—	March 30, 2003	Socorro	LINEAR	BAR	2.5 km	MPC · JPL
154507	2003 FT_{47}	—	March 24, 2003	Kitt Peak	Spacewatch	·	2.0 km	MPC · JPL
154508	2003 FC_{49}	—	March 24, 2003	Haleakala	NEAT	·	3.6 km	MPC · JPL
154509	2003 FT_{54}	—	March 25, 2003	Haleakala	NEAT	·	2.0 km	MPC · JPL
154510	2003 FZ_{55}	—	March 26, 2003	Palomar	NEAT	·	1.6 km	MPC · JPL
154511	2003 FG_{56}	—	March 26, 2003	Palomar	NEAT	·	3.1 km	MPC · JPL
154512	2003 FH_{56}	—	March 26, 2003	Palomar	NEAT	NYS	1.6 km	MPC · JPL
154513	2003 FM_{57}	—	March 26, 2003	Kitt Peak	Spacewatch	MAR	2.2 km	MPC · JPL
154514	2003 FQ_{57}	—	March 26, 2003	Palomar	NEAT	EUN	2.0 km	MPC · JPL
154515	2003 FM_{62}	—	March 26, 2003	Palomar	NEAT	·	2.1 km	MPC · JPL
154516	2003 FS_{63}	—	March 26, 2003	Socorro	LINEAR	EUN	2.2 km	MPC · JPL
154517	2003 FO_{69}	—	March 26, 2003	Palomar	NEAT	·	1.7 km	MPC · JPL
154518	2003 FM_{71}	—	March 26, 2003	Kitt Peak	Spacewatch	·	2.0 km	MPC · JPL
154519	2003 FS_{78}	—	March 27, 2003	Socorro	LINEAR	PHO	2.0 km	MPC · JPL
154520	2003 FP_{82}	—	March 27, 2003	Palomar	NEAT	·	4.1 km	MPC · JPL
154521	2003 FW_{83}	—	March 27, 2003	Campo Imperatore	CINEOS	·	2.0 km	MPC · JPL
154522	2003 FL_{91}	—	March 29, 2003	Anderson Mesa	LONEOS	PHO	2.5 km	MPC · JPL
154523	2003 FF_{92}	—	March 29, 2003	Anderson Mesa	LONEOS	·	2.6 km	MPC · JPL
154524	2003 FV_{98}	—	March 30, 2003	Socorro	LINEAR	·	3.0 km	MPC · JPL
154525	2003 FZ_{106}	—	March 27, 2003	Anderson Mesa	LONEOS	·	3.0 km	MPC · JPL
154526	2003 FO_{107}	—	March 30, 2003	Socorro	LINEAR	·	5.4 km	MPC · JPL
154527	2003 FO_{109}	—	March 31, 2003	Anderson Mesa	LONEOS	·	2.6 km	MPC · JPL
154528	2003 FN_{114}	—	March 31, 2003	Socorro	LINEAR	MAR	2.4 km	MPC · JPL
154529	2003 FW_{114}	—	March 31, 2003	Anderson Mesa	LONEOS	·	4.0 km	MPC · JPL
154530	2003 FH_{115}	—	March 31, 2003	Anderson Mesa	LONEOS	EUN	2.3 km	MPC · JPL
154531	2003 FD_{117}	—	March 24, 2003	Kitt Peak	Spacewatch	·	3.2 km	MPC · JPL
154532	2003 FV_{120}	—	March 25, 2003	Anderson Mesa	LONEOS	·	1.5 km	MPC · JPL
154533	2003 FC_{121}	—	March 25, 2003	Anderson Mesa	LONEOS	·	2.4 km	MPC · JPL
154534	2003 FS_{127}	—	March 31, 2003	Catalina	CSS	·	1.8 km	MPC · JPL
154535	2003 GH_{1}	—	April 1, 2003	Socorro	LINEAR	EUN	1.7 km	MPC · JPL
154536	2003 GC_{7}	—	April 1, 2003	Socorro	LINEAR	·	2.3 km	MPC · JPL
154537	2003 GV_{7}	—	April 2, 2003	Haleakala	NEAT	·	2.2 km	MPC · JPL
154538	2003 GY_{8}	—	April 1, 2003	Socorro	LINEAR	·	1.7 km	MPC · JPL
154539	2003 GM_{10}	—	April 3, 2003	Anderson Mesa	LONEOS	·	3.3 km	MPC · JPL
154540	2003 GF_{13}	—	April 2, 2003	Haleakala	NEAT	·	2.0 km	MPC · JPL
154541	2003 GU_{14}	—	April 2, 2003	Haleakala	NEAT	·	2.9 km	MPC · JPL
154542	2003 GX_{26}	—	April 4, 2003	Kitt Peak	Spacewatch	(5)	1.9 km	MPC · JPL
154543	2003 GZ_{28}	—	April 4, 2003	Kitt Peak	Spacewatch	·	3.4 km	MPC · JPL
154544	2003 GP_{33}	—	April 4, 2003	Cerro Tololo	Deep Lens Survey	·	2.8 km	MPC · JPL
154545	2003 GC_{35}	—	April 8, 2003	Socorro	LINEAR	·	3.3 km	MPC · JPL
154546	2003 GL_{36}	—	April 5, 2003	Kitt Peak	Spacewatch	·	1.6 km	MPC · JPL
154547	2003 GC_{37}	—	April 6, 2003	Anderson Mesa	LONEOS	·	2.0 km	MPC · JPL
154548	2003 GP_{37}	—	April 7, 2003	Socorro	LINEAR	·	1.7 km	MPC · JPL
154549	2003 GK_{38}	—	April 5, 2003	Anderson Mesa	LONEOS	·	3.9 km	MPC · JPL
154550	2003 GT_{43}	—	April 9, 2003	Socorro	LINEAR	·	3.2 km	MPC · JPL
154551	2003 GC_{44}	—	April 9, 2003	Socorro	LINEAR	·	5.8 km	MPC · JPL
154552	2003 GX_{47}	—	April 8, 2003	Socorro	LINEAR	·	1.6 km	MPC · JPL
154553	2003 GO_{50}	—	April 5, 2003	Kitt Peak	Spacewatch	·	3.1 km	MPC · JPL
154554 Heatherelliott	2003 GC_{52}	Heatherelliott	April 1, 2003	Kitt Peak	M. W. Buie	·	3.2 km	MPC · JPL
154555	2003 HA	—	April 21, 2003	Socorro	LINEAR	APO +1km	1.6 km	MPC · JPL
154556	2003 HZ_{5}	—	April 22, 2003	Goodricke-Pigott	Kessel, J. W.	EUN	2.7 km	MPC · JPL
154557	2003 HB_{8}	—	April 24, 2003	Anderson Mesa	LONEOS	·	2.3 km	MPC · JPL
154558	2003 HR_{8}	—	April 25, 2003	Anderson Mesa	LONEOS	·	3.6 km	MPC · JPL
154559	2003 HL_{10}	—	April 25, 2003	Anderson Mesa	LONEOS	·	4.9 km	MPC · JPL
154560	2003 HV_{11}	—	April 25, 2003	Anderson Mesa	LONEOS	·	4.8 km	MPC · JPL
154561	2003 HS_{16}	—	April 24, 2003	Anderson Mesa	LONEOS	·	2.9 km	MPC · JPL
154562	2003 HD_{19}	—	April 26, 2003	Kitt Peak	Spacewatch	·	2.2 km	MPC · JPL
154563	2003 HS_{27}	—	April 25, 2003	Kitt Peak	Spacewatch	·	1.7 km	MPC · JPL
154564	2003 HR_{28}	—	April 26, 2003	Haleakala	NEAT	·	4.4 km	MPC · JPL
154565	2003 HO_{30}	—	April 28, 2003	Socorro	LINEAR	·	3.2 km	MPC · JPL
154566	2003 HR_{30}	—	April 28, 2003	Haleakala	NEAT	JUN	1.9 km	MPC · JPL
154567	2003 HC_{31}	—	April 26, 2003	Kitt Peak	Spacewatch	·	2.2 km	MPC · JPL
154568	2003 HG_{32}	—	April 26, 2003	Socorro	LINEAR	·	3.4 km	MPC · JPL
154569	2003 HF_{33}	—	April 26, 2003	Kitt Peak	Spacewatch	·	3.5 km	MPC · JPL
154570	2003 HC_{38}	—	April 28, 2003	Kitt Peak	Spacewatch	·	3.6 km	MPC · JPL
154571	2003 HR_{40}	—	April 29, 2003	Socorro	LINEAR	EUN	2.9 km	MPC · JPL
154572	2003 HV_{40}	—	April 29, 2003	Socorro	LINEAR	·	4.8 km	MPC · JPL
154573	2003 HF_{41}	—	April 29, 2003	Socorro	LINEAR	·	2.8 km	MPC · JPL
154574	2003 HM_{44}	—	April 27, 2003	Anderson Mesa	LONEOS	·	1.9 km	MPC · JPL
154575	2003 HD_{49}	—	April 30, 2003	Kitt Peak	Spacewatch	·	2.3 km	MPC · JPL
154576	2003 HV_{50}	—	April 28, 2003	Socorro	LINEAR	·	4.9 km	MPC · JPL
154577	2003 HD_{54}	—	April 24, 2003	Anderson Mesa	LONEOS	·	1.4 km	MPC · JPL
154578	2003 HL_{54}	—	April 24, 2003	Anderson Mesa	LONEOS	·	1.8 km	MPC · JPL
154579	2003 HF_{55}	—	April 25, 2003	Kitt Peak	Spacewatch	·	1.4 km	MPC · JPL
154580	2003 HT_{55}	—	April 23, 2003	Bergisch Gladbach	Bergisch Gladbach	·	1.4 km	MPC · JPL
154581	2003 JX_{3}	—	May 3, 2003	Reedy Creek	J. Broughton	EUN	2.7 km	MPC · JPL
154582	2003 JX_{7}	—	May 2, 2003	Socorro	LINEAR	·	3.5 km	MPC · JPL
154583	2003 JC_{12}	—	May 5, 2003	Kitt Peak	Spacewatch	·	2.0 km	MPC · JPL
154584	2003 KB_{9}	—	May 26, 2003	Kitt Peak	Spacewatch	·	3.6 km	MPC · JPL
154585	2003 KW_{14}	—	May 25, 2003	Kitt Peak	Spacewatch	EUN	2.0 km	MPC · JPL
154586	2003 KB_{16}	—	May 28, 2003	Catalina	CSS	·	3.3 km	MPC · JPL
154587 Ennico	2003 KL_{22}	Ennico	May 30, 2003	Cerro Tololo	M. W. Buie	KOR	1.4 km	MPC · JPL
154588	2003 KC_{34}	—	May 26, 2003	Kitt Peak	Spacewatch	HOF	4.0 km	MPC · JPL
154589	2003 MX_{2}	—	June 25, 2003	Socorro	LINEAR	AMO +1km · fast?	1.1 km	MPC · JPL
154590	2003 MA_{3}	—	June 26, 2003	Haleakala	NEAT	APO · PHA	90 m	MPC · JPL
154591	2003 MF_{5}	—	June 26, 2003	Socorro	LINEAR	·	3.5 km	MPC · JPL
154592	2003 NS_{1}	—	July 2, 2003	Socorro	LINEAR	·	5.9 km	MPC · JPL
154593	2003 NK_{4}	—	July 3, 2003	Kitt Peak	Spacewatch	·	3.6 km	MPC · JPL
154594	2003 OB	—	July 18, 2003	Siding Spring	R. H. McNaught	TIR	4.1 km	MPC · JPL
154595	2003 OZ	—	July 20, 2003	Socorro	LINEAR	·	1.4 km	MPC · JPL
154596	2003 OP_{9}	—	July 24, 2003	Campo Imperatore	CINEOS	·	3.2 km	MPC · JPL
154597	2003 OD_{16}	—	July 23, 2003	Palomar	NEAT	TIR	4.0 km	MPC · JPL
154598	2003 OY_{26}	—	July 24, 2003	Palomar	NEAT	KOR	2.4 km	MPC · JPL
154599	2003 OY_{29}	—	July 24, 2003	Palomar	NEAT	·	4.5 km	MPC · JPL
154600	2003 PJ_{2}	—	August 2, 2003	Haleakala	NEAT	·	4.0 km	MPC · JPL

== 154601–154700 ==
back to top

Designation			Discovery			Properties		Ref
Permanent	Provisional	Named after	Date	Site	Discoverer(s)	Category	Diam.	Ref
154601	2003 PO_{2}	—	August 2, 2003	Haleakala	NEAT	·	5.9 km	MPC · JPL
154602	2003 PV_{11}	—	August 1, 2003	Socorro	LINEAR	·	4.8 km	MPC · JPL
154603	2003 QV_{25}	—	August 22, 2003	Palomar	NEAT	HIL · 3:2	11 km	MPC · JPL
154604	2003 QM_{29}	—	August 23, 2003	Črni Vrh	Skvarč, J.	·	6.4 km	MPC · JPL
154605	2003 QG_{34}	—	August 22, 2003	Palomar	NEAT	·	3.9 km	MPC · JPL
154606	2003 QK_{45}	—	August 23, 2003	Socorro	LINEAR	·	5.3 km	MPC · JPL
154607	2003 QJ_{57}	—	August 23, 2003	Socorro	LINEAR	EOS	3.6 km	MPC · JPL
154608	2003 QE_{63}	—	August 23, 2003	Socorro	LINEAR	·	6.2 km	MPC · JPL
154609	2003 QF_{97}	—	August 30, 2003	Kitt Peak	Spacewatch	·	3.1 km	MPC · JPL
154610	2003 QD_{101}	—	August 28, 2003	Haleakala	NEAT	THM	3.9 km	MPC · JPL
154611	2003 RL_{4}	—	September 2, 2003	Socorro	LINEAR	·	7.0 km	MPC · JPL
154612	2003 SO_{37}	—	September 16, 2003	Palomar	NEAT	·	1.2 km	MPC · JPL
154613	2003 SJ_{56}	—	September 16, 2003	Anderson Mesa	LONEOS	CYB · slow	7.2 km	MPC · JPL
154614	2003 SN_{58}	—	September 17, 2003	Anderson Mesa	LONEOS	TIR	5.8 km	MPC · JPL
154615	2003 SG_{59}	—	September 17, 2003	Anderson Mesa	LONEOS	TIR	6.2 km	MPC · JPL
154616	2003 SX_{137}	—	September 21, 2003	Socorro	LINEAR	·	6.5 km	MPC · JPL
154617	2003 SU_{155}	—	September 19, 2003	Anderson Mesa	LONEOS	·	3.5 km	MPC · JPL
154618	2003 SZ_{176}	—	September 18, 2003	Palomar	NEAT	·	5.1 km	MPC · JPL
154619	2003 SV_{189}	—	September 23, 2003	Haleakala	NEAT	VER	5.2 km	MPC · JPL
154620	2003 ST_{203}	—	September 22, 2003	Anderson Mesa	LONEOS	·	6.5 km	MPC · JPL
154621	2003 SZ_{204}	—	September 22, 2003	Kitt Peak	Spacewatch	CYB	5.4 km	MPC · JPL
154622	2003 SD_{205}	—	September 23, 2003	Palomar	NEAT	HYG	4.9 km	MPC · JPL
154623	2003 SU_{238}	—	September 27, 2003	Socorro	LINEAR	·	5.0 km	MPC · JPL
154624	2003 SS_{260}	—	September 27, 2003	Kitt Peak	Spacewatch	·	4.6 km	MPC · JPL
154625	2003 SP_{297}	—	September 18, 2003	Haleakala	NEAT	CYB	8.3 km	MPC · JPL
154626	2003 SP_{309}	—	September 27, 2003	Socorro	LINEAR	·	2.6 km	MPC · JPL
154627	2003 UO_{14}	—	October 16, 2003	Kitt Peak	Spacewatch	·	4.3 km	MPC · JPL
154628	2003 UA_{224}	—	October 22, 2003	Socorro	LINEAR	·	1.7 km	MPC · JPL
154629	2003 UM_{263}	—	October 27, 2003	Socorro	LINEAR	HIL · 3:2	8.0 km	MPC · JPL
154630	2003 VA_{10}	—	November 14, 2003	Palomar	NEAT	H	900 m	MPC · JPL
154631	2003 WO_{25}	—	November 21, 2003	Palomar	NEAT	APO +1km	810 m	MPC · JPL
154632	2003 WT_{151}	—	November 26, 2003	Kitt Peak	Spacewatch	L5	20 km	MPC · JPL
154633	2003 XT	—	December 3, 2003	Socorro	LINEAR	H	890 m	MPC · JPL
154634	2003 XX_{38}	—	December 4, 2003	Socorro	LINEAR	·	1.1 km	MPC · JPL
154635	2003 YX	—	December 17, 2003	Socorro	LINEAR	H	1.1 km	MPC · JPL
154636	2003 YB_{4}	—	December 16, 2003	Catalina	CSS	·	1.3 km	MPC · JPL
154637	2003 YD_{26}	—	December 18, 2003	Socorro	LINEAR	H	990 m	MPC · JPL
154638	2003 YT_{79}	—	December 18, 2003	Socorro	LINEAR	H	1.1 km	MPC · JPL
154639	2003 YJ_{90}	—	December 19, 2003	Kitt Peak	Spacewatch	·	1.2 km	MPC · JPL
154640	2003 YW_{117}	—	December 17, 2003	Socorro	LINEAR	H	1.2 km	MPC · JPL
154641	2003 YS_{124}	—	December 28, 2003	Socorro	LINEAR	H	1.0 km	MPC · JPL
154642	2004 AX_{10}	—	January 5, 2004	Socorro	LINEAR	H	1.3 km	MPC · JPL
154643	2004 BN_{83}	—	January 28, 2004	Socorro	LINEAR	H	1.0 km	MPC · JPL
154644	2004 BH_{112}	—	January 26, 2004	Anderson Mesa	LONEOS	H	980 m	MPC · JPL
154645	2004 BY_{116}	—	January 28, 2004	Catalina	CSS	V	1.1 km	MPC · JPL
154646	2004 BC_{122}	—	January 28, 2004	Catalina	CSS	H ·	1.1 km	MPC · JPL
154647	2004 CS_{49}	—	February 11, 2004	Anderson Mesa	LONEOS	·	1.4 km	MPC · JPL
154648	2004 DN_{3}	—	February 19, 2004	Socorro	LINEAR	H	1.2 km	MPC · JPL
154649	2004 DH_{25}	—	February 19, 2004	Socorro	LINEAR	H	990 m	MPC · JPL
154650	2004 EA_{12}	—	March 11, 2004	Palomar	NEAT	·	1.2 km	MPC · JPL
154651	2004 EP_{15}	—	March 12, 2004	Palomar	NEAT	·	1.5 km	MPC · JPL
154652	2004 EP_{20}	—	March 15, 2004	Socorro	LINEAR	APO	580 m	MPC · JPL
154653	2004 ES_{54}	—	March 14, 2004	Palomar	NEAT	MAR	2.5 km	MPC · JPL
154654	2004 EG_{85}	—	March 15, 2004	Socorro	LINEAR	·	1.8 km	MPC · JPL
154655	2004 EZ_{110}	—	March 15, 2004	Kitt Peak	Spacewatch	·	1.2 km	MPC · JPL
154656	2004 FE_{3}	—	March 17, 2004	Socorro	LINEAR	APO +1km	1.9 km	MPC · JPL
154657	2004 FE_{11}	—	March 17, 2004	Kitt Peak	Spacewatch	NYS	1.9 km	MPC · JPL
154658	2004 FA_{18}	—	March 27, 2004	Anderson Mesa	LONEOS	APO	460 m	MPC · JPL
154659	2004 FT_{20}	—	March 16, 2004	Catalina	CSS	·	1.2 km	MPC · JPL
154660 Kavelaars	2004 FX_{29}	Kavelaars	March 29, 2004	Mauna Kea	D. D. Balam	H	790 m	MPC · JPL
154661	2004 FL_{32}	—	March 30, 2004	Socorro	LINEAR	·	2.9 km	MPC · JPL
154662	2004 FO_{46}	—	March 17, 2004	Socorro	LINEAR	·	1.2 km	MPC · JPL
154663	2004 FP_{65}	—	March 19, 2004	Socorro	LINEAR	V	1.1 km	MPC · JPL
154664	2004 FM_{67}	—	March 20, 2004	Socorro	LINEAR	·	1.5 km	MPC · JPL
154665	2004 FS_{70}	—	March 17, 2004	Kitt Peak	Spacewatch	·	1.2 km	MPC · JPL
154666	2004 FQ_{81}	—	March 16, 2004	Socorro	LINEAR	·	1.7 km	MPC · JPL
154667	2004 FW_{108}	—	March 23, 2004	Kitt Peak	Spacewatch	·	1.8 km	MPC · JPL
154668	2004 FY_{118}	—	March 22, 2004	Socorro	LINEAR	·	1.1 km	MPC · JPL
154669	2004 FA_{127}	—	March 27, 2004	Socorro	LINEAR	·	1.1 km	MPC · JPL
154670	2004 FK_{134}	—	March 26, 2004	Socorro	LINEAR	EUN	2.3 km	MPC · JPL
154671	2004 FA_{148}	—	March 16, 2004	Siding Spring	SSS	·	3.2 km	MPC · JPL
154672	2004 GR_{5}	—	April 11, 2004	Catalina	CSS	·	840 m	MPC · JPL
154673	2004 GV_{12}	—	April 11, 2004	Palomar	NEAT	·	1.5 km	MPC · JPL
154674	2004 GS_{14}	—	April 13, 2004	Palomar	NEAT	·	920 m	MPC · JPL
154675	2004 GT_{19}	—	April 15, 2004	Socorro	LINEAR	PHO	2.0 km	MPC · JPL
154676	2004 GM_{24}	—	April 13, 2004	Kitt Peak	Spacewatch	·	1.2 km	MPC · JPL
154677	2004 GF_{30}	—	April 12, 2004	Palomar	NEAT	·	1.2 km	MPC · JPL
154678	2004 GV_{33}	—	April 12, 2004	Palomar	NEAT	·	2.0 km	MPC · JPL
154679	2004 GD_{37}	—	April 14, 2004	Anderson Mesa	LONEOS	·	890 m	MPC · JPL
154680	2004 GT_{37}	—	April 14, 2004	Anderson Mesa	LONEOS	·	1.4 km	MPC · JPL
154681	2004 GX_{37}	—	April 14, 2004	Anderson Mesa	LONEOS	·	1.1 km	MPC · JPL
154682	2004 GE_{49}	—	April 12, 2004	Kitt Peak	Spacewatch	NYS	1.3 km	MPC · JPL
154683	2004 GK_{59}	—	April 12, 2004	Anderson Mesa	LONEOS	·	2.0 km	MPC · JPL
154684	2004 GO_{59}	—	April 12, 2004	Kitt Peak	Spacewatch	·	1.9 km	MPC · JPL
154685	2004 GO_{74}	—	April 15, 2004	Palomar	NEAT	·	1.2 km	MPC · JPL
154686	2004 GC_{78}	—	April 9, 2004	Siding Spring	SSS	·	1.3 km	MPC · JPL
154687	2004 HS	—	April 17, 2004	Socorro	LINEAR	·	1.6 km	MPC · JPL
154688	2004 HV_{1}	—	April 20, 2004	Desert Eagle	W. K. Y. Yeung	·	1.2 km	MPC · JPL
154689	2004 HF_{2}	—	April 16, 2004	Kitt Peak	Spacewatch	·	1.2 km	MPC · JPL
154690	2004 HA_{6}	—	April 17, 2004	Socorro	LINEAR	·	1.1 km	MPC · JPL
154691	2004 HF_{18}	—	April 17, 2004	Socorro	LINEAR	·	2.3 km	MPC · JPL
154692	2004 HL_{26}	—	April 20, 2004	Socorro	LINEAR	·	940 m	MPC · JPL
154693	2004 HR_{44}	—	April 21, 2004	Socorro	LINEAR	·	1.7 km	MPC · JPL
154694	2004 HW_{48}	—	April 22, 2004	Siding Spring	SSS	·	1.1 km	MPC · JPL
154695	2004 HD_{50}	—	April 23, 2004	Socorro	LINEAR	NYS	1.5 km	MPC · JPL
154696	2004 HX_{61}	—	April 25, 2004	Socorro	LINEAR	·	1.2 km	MPC · JPL
154697	2004 JY_{1}	—	May 10, 2004	Reedy Creek	J. Broughton	(2076)	1.0 km	MPC · JPL
154698	2004 JQ_{8}	—	May 12, 2004	Siding Spring	SSS	·	1.2 km	MPC · JPL
154699	2004 JT_{8}	—	May 13, 2004	Anderson Mesa	LONEOS	·	4.7 km	MPC · JPL
154700	2004 JP_{13}	—	May 8, 2004	Palomar	NEAT	·	1.1 km	MPC · JPL

== 154701–154800 ==
back to top

Designation			Discovery			Properties		Ref
Permanent	Provisional	Named after	Date	Site	Discoverer(s)	Category	Diam.	Ref
154701	2004 JF_{17}	—	May 12, 2004	Siding Spring	SSS	·	1.2 km	MPC · JPL
154702	2004 JS_{18}	—	May 13, 2004	Anderson Mesa	LONEOS	·	1.1 km	MPC · JPL
154703	2004 JO_{19}	—	May 13, 2004	Palomar	NEAT	MAS	900 m	MPC · JPL
154704	2004 JT_{19}	—	May 13, 2004	Palomar	NEAT	·	1.9 km	MPC · JPL
154705	2004 JQ_{22}	—	May 10, 2004	Palomar	NEAT	NYS	1.7 km	MPC · JPL
154706	2004 JW_{23}	—	May 14, 2004	Kitt Peak	Spacewatch	·	1.7 km	MPC · JPL
154707	2004 JR_{25}	—	May 15, 2004	Socorro	LINEAR	V	1.0 km	MPC · JPL
154708	2004 JW_{33}	—	May 15, 2004	Socorro	LINEAR	·	830 m	MPC · JPL
154709	2004 KR	—	May 17, 2004	Socorro	LINEAR	fast	1.4 km	MPC · JPL
154710	2004 KR_{4}	—	May 18, 2004	Socorro	LINEAR	·	1.4 km	MPC · JPL
154711	2004 KH_{6}	—	May 17, 2004	Socorro	LINEAR	·	1.1 km	MPC · JPL
154712	2004 KU_{8}	—	May 18, 2004	Socorro	LINEAR	·	1.4 km	MPC · JPL
154713	2004 LA_{2}	—	June 10, 2004	Catalina	CSS	·	2.8 km	MPC · JPL
154714 de Schepper	2004 LU_{5}	de Schepper	June 6, 2004	Uccle	P. De Cat	·	2.4 km	MPC · JPL
154715	2004 LB_{6}	—	June 13, 2004	Socorro	LINEAR	APO	700 m	MPC · JPL
154716	2004 LV_{9}	—	June 13, 2004	Palomar	NEAT	·	2.4 km	MPC · JPL
154717	2004 LX_{9}	—	June 13, 2004	Palomar	NEAT	V	1.4 km	MPC · JPL
154718	2004 LG_{18}	—	June 15, 2004	Siding Spring	SSS	PHO	2.0 km	MPC · JPL
154719	2004 MV_{4}	—	June 22, 2004	Reedy Creek	J. Broughton	·	2.5 km	MPC · JPL
154720	2004 MJ_{7}	—	June 27, 2004	Reedy Creek	J. Broughton	·	3.3 km	MPC · JPL
154721	2004 MW_{7}	—	June 16, 2004	Anderson Mesa	LONEOS	ERI	2.3 km	MPC · JPL
154722	2004 NA	—	July 6, 2004	Campo Imperatore	CINEOS	NYS	2.0 km	MPC · JPL
154723	2004 NS	—	July 7, 2004	Campo Imperatore	CINEOS	·	1.6 km	MPC · JPL
154724	2004 NU	—	July 7, 2004	Campo Imperatore	CINEOS	·	2.0 km	MPC · JPL
154725	2004 NC_{2}	—	July 9, 2004	Siding Spring	SSS	·	2.3 km	MPC · JPL
154726	2004 NO_{2}	—	July 10, 2004	Catalina	CSS	·	2.0 km	MPC · JPL
154727	2004 NR_{3}	—	July 12, 2004	Reedy Creek	J. Broughton	NYS	1.8 km	MPC · JPL
154728	2004 NM_{9}	—	July 9, 2004	Socorro	LINEAR	NYS	2.5 km	MPC · JPL
154729	2004 NQ_{9}	—	July 9, 2004	Socorro	LINEAR	·	3.2 km	MPC · JPL
154730	2004 NW_{9}	—	July 9, 2004	Socorro	LINEAR	·	1.7 km	MPC · JPL
154731	2004 NM_{10}	—	July 9, 2004	Socorro	LINEAR	·	3.0 km	MPC · JPL
154732	2004 NC_{12}	—	July 11, 2004	Socorro	LINEAR	·	3.0 km	MPC · JPL
154733	2004 NJ_{12}	—	July 11, 2004	Socorro	LINEAR	NYS	2.1 km	MPC · JPL
154734	2004 NH_{14}	—	July 11, 2004	Socorro	LINEAR	CLA	2.8 km	MPC · JPL
154735	2004 NX_{15}	—	July 11, 2004	Socorro	LINEAR	·	2.4 km	MPC · JPL
154736	2004 NA_{16}	—	July 11, 2004	Socorro	LINEAR	·	3.9 km	MPC · JPL
154737	2004 NM_{16}	—	July 11, 2004	Socorro	LINEAR	EUN · slow	2.5 km	MPC · JPL
154738	2004 NO_{18}	—	July 14, 2004	Socorro	LINEAR	V	1.3 km	MPC · JPL
154739	2004 NP_{21}	—	July 15, 2004	Socorro	LINEAR	·	2.2 km	MPC · JPL
154740	2004 NO_{23}	—	July 14, 2004	Socorro	LINEAR	·	2.9 km	MPC · JPL
154741	2004 NO_{27}	—	July 11, 2004	Socorro	LINEAR	·	1.7 km	MPC · JPL
154742	2004 NQ_{30}	—	July 9, 2004	Anderson Mesa	LONEOS	MAS	1.0 km	MPC · JPL
154743	2004 OJ_{2}	—	July 16, 2004	Socorro	LINEAR	·	1.9 km	MPC · JPL
154744	2004 OV_{2}	—	July 16, 2004	Socorro	LINEAR	·	2.2 km	MPC · JPL
154745	2004 OT_{4}	—	July 16, 2004	Socorro	LINEAR	·	2.2 km	MPC · JPL
154746	2004 OZ_{4}	—	July 16, 2004	Socorro	LINEAR	·	2.1 km	MPC · JPL
154747	2004 OM_{9}	—	July 19, 2004	Reedy Creek	J. Broughton	·	1.7 km	MPC · JPL
154748	2004 OS_{9}	—	July 20, 2004	Reedy Creek	J. Broughton	·	3.2 km	MPC · JPL
154749	2004 PV_{2}	—	August 3, 2004	Siding Spring	SSS	NYS	2.1 km	MPC · JPL
154750	2004 PF_{3}	—	August 3, 2004	Siding Spring	SSS	·	1.6 km	MPC · JPL
154751	2004 PN_{3}	—	August 3, 2004	Siding Spring	SSS	·	5.4 km	MPC · JPL
154752	2004 PL_{4}	—	August 5, 2004	Palomar	NEAT	·	3.1 km	MPC · JPL
154753	2004 PF_{5}	—	August 6, 2004	Palomar	NEAT	SUL	3.9 km	MPC · JPL
154754	2004 PO_{9}	—	August 6, 2004	Campo Imperatore	CINEOS	ADE	4.3 km	MPC · JPL
154755	2004 PT_{9}	—	August 6, 2004	Campo Imperatore	CINEOS	HOF	4.2 km	MPC · JPL
154756	2004 PW_{9}	—	August 6, 2004	Campo Imperatore	CINEOS	KOR	2.3 km	MPC · JPL
154757	2004 PX_{9}	—	August 6, 2004	Campo Imperatore	CINEOS	·	3.0 km	MPC · JPL
154758	2004 PL_{10}	—	August 6, 2004	Campo Imperatore	CINEOS	·	1.6 km	MPC · JPL
154759	2004 PX_{11}	—	August 7, 2004	Palomar	NEAT	NYS	1.8 km	MPC · JPL
154760	2004 PS_{12}	—	August 7, 2004	Palomar	NEAT	MAS	1.2 km	MPC · JPL
154761	2004 PR_{14}	—	August 7, 2004	Palomar	NEAT	EUN	2.2 km	MPC · JPL
154762	2004 PD_{15}	—	August 7, 2004	Palomar	NEAT	·	2.5 km	MPC · JPL
154763	2004 PJ_{15}	—	August 7, 2004	Palomar	NEAT	·	3.9 km	MPC · JPL
154764	2004 PP_{15}	—	August 7, 2004	Palomar	NEAT	MAS	1.4 km	MPC · JPL
154765	2004 PQ_{18}	—	August 8, 2004	Anderson Mesa	LONEOS	·	2.7 km	MPC · JPL
154766	2004 PG_{19}	—	August 8, 2004	Anderson Mesa	LONEOS	·	2.8 km	MPC · JPL
154767	2004 PZ_{22}	—	August 8, 2004	Socorro	LINEAR	AEO	1.7 km	MPC · JPL
154768	2004 PO_{23}	—	August 8, 2004	Socorro	LINEAR	EOS	2.8 km	MPC · JPL
154769	2004 PM_{24}	—	August 8, 2004	Socorro	LINEAR	MAS	1.3 km	MPC · JPL
154770	2004 PB_{25}	—	August 8, 2004	Socorro	LINEAR	·	2.9 km	MPC · JPL
154771	2004 PH_{25}	—	August 8, 2004	Socorro	LINEAR	NYS	1.8 km	MPC · JPL
154772	2004 PK_{25}	—	August 8, 2004	Socorro	LINEAR	HOF	3.9 km	MPC · JPL
154773	2004 PC_{26}	—	August 8, 2004	Socorro	LINEAR	MAS	1.1 km	MPC · JPL
154774	2004 PK_{28}	—	August 6, 2004	Palomar	NEAT	WIT	1.5 km	MPC · JPL
154775	2004 PL_{31}	—	August 8, 2004	Socorro	LINEAR	·	3.9 km	MPC · JPL
154776	2004 PF_{32}	—	August 8, 2004	Socorro	LINEAR	·	3.0 km	MPC · JPL
154777	2004 PO_{32}	—	August 8, 2004	Socorro	LINEAR	NYS	2.5 km	MPC · JPL
154778	2004 PO_{33}	—	August 8, 2004	Socorro	LINEAR	·	5.7 km	MPC · JPL
154779	2004 PQ_{33}	—	August 8, 2004	Anderson Mesa	LONEOS	·	2.3 km	MPC · JPL
154780	2004 PB_{35}	—	August 8, 2004	Anderson Mesa	LONEOS	·	2.6 km	MPC · JPL
154781	2004 PW_{37}	—	August 9, 2004	Socorro	LINEAR	·	2.2 km	MPC · JPL
154782	2004 PS_{43}	—	August 6, 2004	Palomar	NEAT	AGN	1.8 km	MPC · JPL
154783	2004 PA_{44}	—	August 7, 2004	Palomar	NEAT	T_{j} (2.53) · unusual · critical	10 km	MPC · JPL
154784	2004 PG_{44}	—	August 7, 2004	Palomar	NEAT	·	1.7 km	MPC · JPL
154785	2004 PV_{48}	—	August 8, 2004	Socorro	LINEAR	·	2.1 km	MPC · JPL
154786	2004 PY_{51}	—	August 8, 2004	Socorro	LINEAR	NYS	2.2 km	MPC · JPL
154787	2004 PJ_{53}	—	August 8, 2004	Socorro	LINEAR	·	2.0 km	MPC · JPL
154788	2004 PU_{53}	—	August 8, 2004	Socorro	LINEAR	·	1.8 km	MPC · JPL
154789	2004 PH_{60}	—	August 9, 2004	Anderson Mesa	LONEOS	·	3.2 km	MPC · JPL
154790	2004 PO_{62}	—	August 10, 2004	Socorro	LINEAR	EOS	2.8 km	MPC · JPL
154791	2004 PC_{65}	—	August 10, 2004	Socorro	LINEAR	·	2.4 km	MPC · JPL
154792	2004 PL_{67}	—	August 5, 2004	Palomar	NEAT	·	1.3 km	MPC · JPL
154793	2004 PO_{68}	—	August 6, 2004	Campo Imperatore	CINEOS	·	3.2 km	MPC · JPL
154794	2004 PK_{69}	—	August 7, 2004	Palomar	NEAT	KOR	2.2 km	MPC · JPL
154795	2004 PW_{70}	—	August 8, 2004	Socorro	LINEAR	·	1.8 km	MPC · JPL
154796	2004 PX_{74}	—	August 8, 2004	Anderson Mesa	LONEOS	WIT	1.4 km	MPC · JPL
154797	2004 PS_{76}	—	August 9, 2004	Socorro	LINEAR	·	3.4 km	MPC · JPL
154798	2004 PQ_{80}	—	August 9, 2004	Siding Spring	SSS	·	3.0 km	MPC · JPL
154799	2004 PN_{82}	—	August 10, 2004	Socorro	LINEAR	·	1.4 km	MPC · JPL
154800	2004 PZ_{83}	—	August 10, 2004	Socorro	LINEAR	·	1.6 km	MPC · JPL

== 154801–154900 ==
back to top

Designation			Discovery			Properties		Ref
Permanent	Provisional	Named after	Date	Site	Discoverer(s)	Category	Diam.	Ref
154801	2004 PC_{84}	—	August 10, 2004	Socorro	LINEAR	·	3.6 km	MPC · JPL
154802	2004 PF_{85}	—	August 10, 2004	Socorro	LINEAR	·	3.9 km	MPC · JPL
154803	2004 PS_{88}	—	August 7, 2004	Palomar	NEAT	·	2.6 km	MPC · JPL
154804	2004 PY_{89}	—	August 10, 2004	Socorro	LINEAR	·	3.6 km	MPC · JPL
154805	2004 PF_{93}	—	August 12, 2004	Reedy Creek	J. Broughton	V	1.1 km	MPC · JPL
154806	2004 PH_{94}	—	August 10, 2004	Socorro	LINEAR	EMA	5.7 km	MPC · JPL
154807	2004 PP_{97}	—	August 15, 2004	Siding Spring	SSS	AMO · APO · slow	470 m	MPC · JPL
154808	2004 PF_{104}	—	August 12, 2004	Siding Spring	SSS	·	2.4 km	MPC · JPL
154809	2004 PW_{105}	—	August 15, 2004	Siding Spring	SSS	·	4.2 km	MPC · JPL
154810	2004 PZ_{106}	—	August 15, 2004	Campo Imperatore	CINEOS	·	2.1 km	MPC · JPL
154811	2004 PK_{107}	—	August 11, 2004	Socorro	LINEAR	·	1.5 km	MPC · JPL
154812	2004 PO_{114}	—	August 10, 2004	Socorro	LINEAR	·	3.1 km	MPC · JPL
154813	2004 QA	—	August 16, 2004	Pla D'Arguines	R. Ferrando	·	1.7 km	MPC · JPL
154814	2004 QM_{2}	—	August 17, 2004	Socorro	LINEAR	·	2.5 km	MPC · JPL
154815	2004 QE_{4}	—	August 19, 2004	Siding Spring	SSS	AGN	2.3 km	MPC · JPL
154816	2004 QR_{7}	—	August 22, 2004	Bergisch Gladbach	W. Bickel	KOR	1.5 km	MPC · JPL
154817	2004 QX_{8}	—	August 19, 2004	Siding Spring	SSS	ELF	7.1 km	MPC · JPL
154818	2004 QA_{9}	—	August 19, 2004	Siding Spring	SSS	HYG	4.6 km	MPC · JPL
154819	2004 QN_{9}	—	August 21, 2004	Siding Spring	SSS	·	2.6 km	MPC · JPL
154820	2004 QU_{10}	—	August 21, 2004	Siding Spring	SSS	·	3.5 km	MPC · JPL
154821	2004 QN_{12}	—	August 21, 2004	Siding Spring	SSS	·	1.3 km	MPC · JPL
154822	2004 QC_{21}	—	August 21, 2004	Kitt Peak	Spacewatch	KOR	2.4 km	MPC · JPL
154823	2004 QX_{25}	—	August 26, 2004	Catalina	CSS	EUP	7.1 km	MPC · JPL
154824	2004 RL_{4}	—	September 4, 2004	Palomar	NEAT	·	6.0 km	MPC · JPL
154825	2004 RL_{6}	—	September 5, 2004	Palomar	NEAT	·	3.0 km	MPC · JPL
154826	2004 RO_{6}	—	September 5, 2004	Palomar	NEAT	·	2.1 km	MPC · JPL
154827	2004 RM_{7}	—	September 6, 2004	Palomar	NEAT	T_{j} (2.96)	9.4 km	MPC · JPL
154828	2004 RT_{8}	—	September 6, 2004	Goodricke-Pigott	R. A. Tucker	EUN	2.1 km	MPC · JPL
154829	2004 RA_{9}	—	September 6, 2004	Goodricke-Pigott	R. A. Tucker	AGN	2.1 km	MPC · JPL
154830	2004 RT_{12}	—	September 3, 2004	Anderson Mesa	LONEOS	·	4.3 km	MPC · JPL
154831	2004 RY_{13}	—	September 6, 2004	Siding Spring	SSS	·	3.1 km	MPC · JPL
154832	2004 RE_{16}	—	September 7, 2004	Kitt Peak	Spacewatch	·	4.5 km	MPC · JPL
154833	2004 RK_{18}	—	September 7, 2004	Socorro	LINEAR	KOR	2.2 km	MPC · JPL
154834	2004 RB_{26}	—	September 4, 2004	Palomar	NEAT	·	1.6 km	MPC · JPL
154835	2004 RT_{27}	—	September 6, 2004	Siding Spring	SSS	·	5.6 km	MPC · JPL
154836	2004 RS_{29}	—	September 7, 2004	Socorro	LINEAR	·	2.5 km	MPC · JPL
154837	2004 RW_{29}	—	September 7, 2004	Socorro	LINEAR	·	2.4 km	MPC · JPL
154838	2004 RR_{30}	—	September 7, 2004	Socorro	LINEAR	·	2.4 km	MPC · JPL
154839	2004 RC_{35}	—	September 7, 2004	Socorro	LINEAR	·	3.5 km	MPC · JPL
154840	2004 RW_{35}	—	September 7, 2004	Socorro	LINEAR	·	4.0 km	MPC · JPL
154841	2004 RC_{36}	—	September 7, 2004	Socorro	LINEAR	·	4.8 km	MPC · JPL
154842	2004 RA_{42}	—	September 7, 2004	Kitt Peak	Spacewatch	·	3.7 km	MPC · JPL
154843	2004 RK_{43}	—	September 8, 2004	Socorro	LINEAR	·	3.2 km	MPC · JPL
154844	2004 RU_{44}	—	September 8, 2004	Socorro	LINEAR	·	5.5 km	MPC · JPL
154845	2004 RS_{46}	—	September 8, 2004	Socorro	LINEAR	·	2.2 km	MPC · JPL
154846	2004 RX_{47}	—	September 8, 2004	Socorro	LINEAR	THM	3.4 km	MPC · JPL
154847	2004 RJ_{49}	—	September 8, 2004	Socorro	LINEAR	·	3.5 km	MPC · JPL
154848	2004 RS_{51}	—	September 8, 2004	Socorro	LINEAR	KOR	2.4 km	MPC · JPL
154849	2004 RU_{51}	—	September 8, 2004	Socorro	LINEAR	NYS	2.2 km	MPC · JPL
154850	2004 RH_{53}	—	September 8, 2004	Socorro	LINEAR	·	4.3 km	MPC · JPL
154851	2004 RR_{53}	—	September 8, 2004	Socorro	LINEAR	·	3.4 km	MPC · JPL
154852	2004 RE_{61}	—	September 8, 2004	Socorro	LINEAR	·	5.9 km	MPC · JPL
154853	2004 RF_{61}	—	September 8, 2004	Socorro	LINEAR	·	3.3 km	MPC · JPL
154854	2004 RT_{65}	—	September 8, 2004	Socorro	LINEAR	·	6.7 km	MPC · JPL
154855	2004 RK_{66}	—	September 8, 2004	Socorro	LINEAR	·	2.9 km	MPC · JPL
154856	2004 RD_{68}	—	September 8, 2004	Socorro	LINEAR	·	1.8 km	MPC · JPL
154857	2004 RG_{68}	—	September 8, 2004	Socorro	LINEAR	·	4.7 km	MPC · JPL
154858	2004 RK_{69}	—	September 8, 2004	Socorro	LINEAR	·	3.5 km	MPC · JPL
154859	2004 RN_{69}	—	September 8, 2004	Socorro	LINEAR	KOR	2.1 km	MPC · JPL
154860	2004 RO_{74}	—	September 8, 2004	Socorro	LINEAR	·	3.7 km	MPC · JPL
154861	2004 RF_{82}	—	September 9, 2004	Socorro	LINEAR	KOR	1.9 km	MPC · JPL
154862	2004 RG_{82}	—	September 9, 2004	Socorro	LINEAR	MAS	1.1 km	MPC · JPL
154863	2004 RY_{82}	—	September 9, 2004	Socorro	LINEAR	·	5.6 km	MPC · JPL
154864	2004 RM_{83}	—	September 9, 2004	Socorro	LINEAR	KOR	2.2 km	MPC · JPL
154865 Stefanheutz	2004 RO_{84}	Stefanheutz	September 9, 2004	Altschwendt	W. Ries	BRA	3.5 km	MPC · JPL
154866	2004 RE_{92}	—	September 8, 2004	Socorro	LINEAR	HOF	4.0 km	MPC · JPL
154867	2004 RM_{94}	—	September 8, 2004	Socorro	LINEAR	·	2.4 km	MPC · JPL
154868	2004 RF_{101}	—	September 8, 2004	Socorro	LINEAR	NEM	2.9 km	MPC · JPL
154869	2004 RO_{102}	—	September 8, 2004	Socorro	LINEAR	HYG	3.7 km	MPC · JPL
154870	2004 RV_{103}	—	September 8, 2004	Palomar	NEAT	·	7.5 km	MPC · JPL
154871	2004 RZ_{105}	—	September 8, 2004	Palomar	NEAT	·	5.3 km	MPC · JPL
154872	2004 RC_{106}	—	September 8, 2004	Palomar	NEAT	·	3.0 km	MPC · JPL
154873	2004 RQ_{106}	—	September 8, 2004	Palomar	NEAT	·	5.5 km	MPC · JPL
154874	2004 RN_{108}	—	September 9, 2004	Kitt Peak	Spacewatch	·	4.0 km	MPC · JPL
154875	2004 RW_{114}	—	September 7, 2004	Socorro	LINEAR	·	4.0 km	MPC · JPL
154876	2004 RN_{117}	—	September 7, 2004	Kitt Peak	Spacewatch	KOR	1.8 km	MPC · JPL
154877	2004 RA_{118}	—	September 7, 2004	Socorro	LINEAR	·	4.0 km	MPC · JPL
154878	2004 RH_{135}	—	September 7, 2004	Kitt Peak	Spacewatch	THM	3.8 km	MPC · JPL
154879	2004 RD_{140}	—	September 8, 2004	Socorro	LINEAR	AGN	2.0 km	MPC · JPL
154880	2004 RL_{143}	—	September 8, 2004	Socorro	LINEAR	·	3.8 km	MPC · JPL
154881	2004 RT_{143}	—	September 8, 2004	Socorro	LINEAR	EOS	3.4 km	MPC · JPL
154882	2004 RR_{144}	—	September 9, 2004	Socorro	LINEAR	·	5.1 km	MPC · JPL
154883	2004 RM_{147}	—	September 9, 2004	Socorro	LINEAR	TEL	2.2 km	MPC · JPL
154884	2004 RN_{148}	—	September 9, 2004	Socorro	LINEAR	·	4.6 km	MPC · JPL
154885	2004 RJ_{149}	—	September 9, 2004	Socorro	LINEAR	·	2.8 km	MPC · JPL
154886	2004 RH_{156}	—	September 10, 2004	Socorro	LINEAR	GEF	2.2 km	MPC · JPL
154887	2004 RN_{163}	—	September 11, 2004	Siding Spring	SSS	·	6.0 km	MPC · JPL
154888	2004 RC_{165}	—	September 9, 2004	Uccle	P. De Cat, E. W. Elst	TEL	2.3 km	MPC · JPL
154889	2004 RB_{166}	—	September 6, 2004	Siding Spring	SSS	·	4.1 km	MPC · JPL
154890	2004 RH_{174}	—	September 10, 2004	Socorro	LINEAR	·	4.7 km	MPC · JPL
154891	2004 RS_{176}	—	September 10, 2004	Socorro	LINEAR	·	3.5 km	MPC · JPL
154892	2004 RH_{179}	—	September 10, 2004	Socorro	LINEAR	·	4.9 km	MPC · JPL
154893	2004 RV_{191}	—	September 10, 2004	Socorro	LINEAR	·	5.2 km	MPC · JPL
154894	2004 RK_{217}	—	September 11, 2004	Socorro	LINEAR	·	6.4 km	MPC · JPL
154895	2004 RO_{223}	—	September 7, 2004	Kitt Peak	Spacewatch	·	3.3 km	MPC · JPL
154896	2004 RD_{230}	—	September 9, 2004	Kitt Peak	Spacewatch	·	4.2 km	MPC · JPL
154897	2004 RN_{232}	—	September 9, 2004	Kitt Peak	Spacewatch	·	3.2 km	MPC · JPL
154898	2004 RS_{233}	—	September 9, 2004	Kitt Peak	Spacewatch	EOS	2.9 km	MPC · JPL
154899	2004 RR_{239}	—	September 10, 2004	Kitt Peak	Spacewatch	·	3.0 km	MPC · JPL
154900	2004 RM_{241}	—	September 10, 2004	Kitt Peak	Spacewatch	THM	3.5 km	MPC · JPL

== 154901–155000 ==
back to top

Designation			Discovery			Properties		Ref
Permanent	Provisional	Named after	Date	Site	Discoverer(s)	Category	Diam.	Ref
154901	2004 RP_{246}	—	September 10, 2004	Kitt Peak	Spacewatch	EOS	3.2 km	MPC · JPL
154902 Davidtoth	2004 RU_{247}	Davidtoth	September 12, 2004	Jarnac	Jarnac	·	5.4 km	MPC · JPL
154903	2004 RY_{249}	—	September 13, 2004	Socorro	LINEAR	·	2.4 km	MPC · JPL
154904	2004 RA_{306}	—	September 12, 2004	Socorro	LINEAR	CYB	4.7 km	MPC · JPL
154905	2004 RB_{306}	—	September 12, 2004	Socorro	LINEAR	·	4.6 km	MPC · JPL
154906	2004 RH_{306}	—	September 12, 2004	Socorro	LINEAR	(11097) · CYB	4.7 km	MPC · JPL
154907	2004 RE_{316}	—	September 15, 2004	Bergisch Gladbach	W. Bickel	·	1.9 km	MPC · JPL
154908	2004 RE_{324}	—	September 13, 2004	Socorro	LINEAR	EOS	3.9 km	MPC · JPL
154909	2004 RL_{326}	—	September 13, 2004	Palomar	NEAT	·	2.8 km	MPC · JPL
154910	2004 RA_{337}	—	September 15, 2004	Kitt Peak	Spacewatch	·	5.9 km	MPC · JPL
154911	2004 RK_{343}	—	September 15, 2004	Socorro	LINEAR	EOS	3.7 km	MPC · JPL
154912	2004 SQ_{4}	—	September 17, 2004	Socorro	LINEAR	·	3.2 km	MPC · JPL
154913	2004 SF_{6}	—	September 17, 2004	Kitt Peak	Spacewatch	·	2.4 km	MPC · JPL
154914	2004 ST_{8}	—	September 17, 2004	Socorro	LINEAR	·	2.7 km	MPC · JPL
154915	2004 SB_{14}	—	September 17, 2004	Socorro	LINEAR	CYB	9.8 km	MPC · JPL
154916	2004 SJ_{21}	—	September 16, 2004	Kitt Peak	Spacewatch	·	2.2 km	MPC · JPL
154917	2004 SP_{22}	—	September 17, 2004	Socorro	LINEAR	MRX	2.0 km	MPC · JPL
154918	2004 SF_{24}	—	September 17, 2004	Kitt Peak	Spacewatch	·	4.1 km	MPC · JPL
154919	2004 SY_{29}	—	September 17, 2004	Socorro	LINEAR	HYG	4.6 km	MPC · JPL
154920	2004 SQ_{32}	—	September 17, 2004	Socorro	LINEAR	·	4.6 km	MPC · JPL
154921	2004 ST_{32}	—	September 17, 2004	Socorro	LINEAR	(5)	3.1 km	MPC · JPL
154922	2004 SW_{32}	—	September 17, 2004	Socorro	LINEAR	·	4.1 km	MPC · JPL
154923	2004 SK_{39}	—	September 17, 2004	Socorro	LINEAR	·	3.8 km	MPC · JPL
154924	2004 SD_{40}	—	September 17, 2004	Socorro	LINEAR	·	2.6 km	MPC · JPL
154925	2004 SK_{41}	—	September 17, 2004	Kitt Peak	Spacewatch	KOR	2.5 km	MPC · JPL
154926	2004 SV_{47}	—	September 18, 2004	Socorro	LINEAR	·	5.2 km	MPC · JPL
154927	2004 SK_{54}	—	September 22, 2004	Socorro	LINEAR	·	8.6 km	MPC · JPL
154928	2004 SD_{57}	—	September 16, 2004	Anderson Mesa	LONEOS	·	3.6 km	MPC · JPL
154929	2004 SK_{61}	—	September 17, 2004	Anderson Mesa	LONEOS	·	4.7 km	MPC · JPL
154930	2004 TJ_{1}	—	October 4, 2004	Goodricke-Pigott	R. A. Tucker	·	3.6 km	MPC · JPL
154931	2004 TQ_{1}	—	October 2, 2004	Needville	J. Dellinger, P. G. A. Garossino	·	2.9 km	MPC · JPL
154932 Sviderskienė	2004 TB_{21}	Sviderskienė	October 12, 2004	Moletai	K. Černis, Zdanavicius, J.	3:2	6.3 km	MPC · JPL
154933	2004 TP_{23}	—	October 4, 2004	Kitt Peak	Spacewatch	·	5.4 km	MPC · JPL
154934	2004 TO_{29}	—	October 4, 2004	Kitt Peak	Spacewatch	MRX	2.0 km	MPC · JPL
154935	2004 TF_{36}	—	October 4, 2004	Anderson Mesa	LONEOS	·	2.6 km	MPC · JPL
154936	2004 TM_{38}	—	October 4, 2004	Kitt Peak	Spacewatch	·	2.3 km	MPC · JPL
154937	2004 TO_{48}	—	October 4, 2004	Kitt Peak	Spacewatch	·	5.2 km	MPC · JPL
154938 Besserman	2004 TX_{49}	Besserman	October 4, 2004	Jarnac	Jarnac	THM	2.8 km	MPC · JPL
154939	2004 TJ_{53}	—	October 4, 2004	Kitt Peak	Spacewatch	·	3.0 km	MPC · JPL
154940	2004 TF_{54}	—	October 4, 2004	Kitt Peak	Spacewatch	·	3.9 km	MPC · JPL
154941	2004 TP_{54}	—	October 4, 2004	Kitt Peak	Spacewatch	THM	5.3 km	MPC · JPL
154942	2004 TH_{58}	—	October 5, 2004	Kitt Peak	Spacewatch	·	1.3 km	MPC · JPL
154943	2004 TR_{60}	—	October 5, 2004	Anderson Mesa	LONEOS	·	7.2 km	MPC · JPL
154944	2004 TZ_{61}	—	October 5, 2004	Anderson Mesa	LONEOS	·	2.5 km	MPC · JPL
154945	2004 TM_{64}	—	October 5, 2004	Kitt Peak	Spacewatch	KOR	2.2 km	MPC · JPL
154946	2004 TD_{65}	—	October 5, 2004	Palomar	NEAT	·	7.8 km	MPC · JPL
154947	2004 TH_{69}	—	October 5, 2004	Anderson Mesa	LONEOS	·	3.2 km	MPC · JPL
154948	2004 TC_{76}	—	October 7, 2004	Anderson Mesa	LONEOS	·	4.0 km	MPC · JPL
154949	2004 TF_{78}	—	October 4, 2004	Anderson Mesa	LONEOS	·	5.3 km	MPC · JPL
154950	2004 TX_{87}	—	October 5, 2004	Kitt Peak	Spacewatch	·	2.8 km	MPC · JPL
154951	2004 TR_{92}	—	October 5, 2004	Kitt Peak	Spacewatch	(5)	1.8 km	MPC · JPL
154952	2004 TX_{99}	—	October 5, 2004	Kitt Peak	Spacewatch	·	2.2 km	MPC · JPL
154953	2004 TP_{106}	—	October 7, 2004	Socorro	LINEAR	MRX	1.8 km	MPC · JPL
154954	2004 TN_{118}	—	October 5, 2004	Palomar	NEAT	·	5.4 km	MPC · JPL
154955	2004 TN_{120}	—	October 6, 2004	Palomar	NEAT	HYG	5.6 km	MPC · JPL
154956	2004 TH_{125}	—	October 7, 2004	Socorro	LINEAR	·	1.7 km	MPC · JPL
154957	2004 TK_{125}	—	October 7, 2004	Socorro	LINEAR	KOR	2.3 km	MPC · JPL
154958	2004 TX_{135}	—	October 8, 2004	Anderson Mesa	LONEOS	·	6.7 km	MPC · JPL
154959	2004 TR_{137}	—	October 8, 2004	Anderson Mesa	LONEOS	·	3.8 km	MPC · JPL
154960	2004 TK_{186}	—	October 7, 2004	Kitt Peak	Spacewatch	3:2 · SHU	9.2 km	MPC · JPL
154961	2004 TC_{214}	—	October 9, 2004	Kitt Peak	Spacewatch	·	4.4 km	MPC · JPL
154962	2004 TR_{216}	—	October 3, 2004	Palomar	NEAT	·	2.7 km	MPC · JPL
154963	2004 TG_{220}	—	October 5, 2004	Socorro	LINEAR	·	5.3 km	MPC · JPL
154964	2004 TB_{232}	—	October 8, 2004	Kitt Peak	Spacewatch	·	5.1 km	MPC · JPL
154965	2004 TB_{238}	—	October 9, 2004	Kitt Peak	Spacewatch	HYG	4.7 km	MPC · JPL
154966	2004 TF_{239}	—	October 9, 2004	Kitt Peak	Spacewatch	SYL · CYB	7.7 km	MPC · JPL
154967	2004 TK_{252}	—	October 9, 2004	Palomar	NEAT	·	7.2 km	MPC · JPL
154968	2004 TV_{265}	—	October 9, 2004	Kitt Peak	Spacewatch	·	4.9 km	MPC · JPL
154969	2004 TO_{272}	—	October 9, 2004	Kitt Peak	Spacewatch	·	6.2 km	MPC · JPL
154970	2004 TB_{280}	—	October 10, 2004	Kitt Peak	Spacewatch	·	3.0 km	MPC · JPL
154971	2004 TL_{282}	—	October 7, 2004	Socorro	LINEAR	3:2	8.2 km	MPC · JPL
154972	2004 TS_{343}	—	October 14, 2004	Kitt Peak	Spacewatch	·	4.2 km	MPC · JPL
154973	2004 TC_{344}	—	October 15, 2004	Kitt Peak	Spacewatch	fast	5.4 km	MPC · JPL
154974	2004 TA_{345}	—	October 15, 2004	Kitt Peak	Spacewatch	·	5.5 km	MPC · JPL
154975	2004 TM_{359}	—	October 9, 2004	Kitt Peak	Spacewatch	·	4.6 km	MPC · JPL
154976	2004 UA_{1}	—	October 19, 2004	Hormersdorf	Hormersdorf	·	5.9 km	MPC · JPL
154977	2004 UG_{1}	—	October 20, 2004	Socorro	LINEAR	EOS	3.0 km	MPC · JPL
154978	2004 UN_{3}	—	October 19, 2004	Socorro	LINEAR	·	3.0 km	MPC · JPL
154979	2004 UG_{6}	—	October 20, 2004	Socorro	LINEAR	·	4.3 km	MPC · JPL
154980	2004 UN_{7}	—	October 21, 2004	Socorro	LINEAR	EOS	3.6 km	MPC · JPL
154981	2004 VC_{4}	—	November 3, 2004	Kitt Peak	Spacewatch	·	5.9 km	MPC · JPL
154982	2004 VA_{28}	—	November 5, 2004	Campo Imperatore	CINEOS	·	3.7 km	MPC · JPL
154983	2004 VL_{32}	—	November 3, 2004	Kitt Peak	Spacewatch	·	5.1 km	MPC · JPL
154984	2004 VP_{46}	—	November 4, 2004	Kitt Peak	Spacewatch	·	4.2 km	MPC · JPL
154985	2004 VZ_{51}	—	November 4, 2004	Catalina	CSS	·	4.7 km	MPC · JPL
154986	2004 VR_{66}	—	November 4, 2004	Catalina	CSS	MIS	4.1 km	MPC · JPL
154987	2004 WJ_{4}	—	November 17, 2004	Campo Imperatore	CINEOS	·	3.2 km	MPC · JPL
154988	2004 XN_{35}	—	December 12, 2004	Catalina	CSS	APO	750 m	MPC · JPL
154989	2005 AG_{4}	—	January 6, 2005	Catalina	CSS	L5	15 km	MPC · JPL
154990	2005 AA_{66}	—	January 13, 2005	Kitt Peak	Spacewatch	L5	13 km	MPC · JPL
154991 Vinciguerra	2005 BX_{26}	Vinciguerra	January 17, 2005	La Silla	A. Boattini, H. Scholl	AMO	690 m	MPC · JPL
154992	2005 CV_{68}	—	February 4, 2005	Anderson Mesa	LONEOS	L5	18 km	MPC · JPL
154993	2005 EA_{94}	—	March 8, 2005	Socorro	LINEAR	APO +1km	830 m	MPC · JPL
154994	2005 EW_{291}	—	March 10, 2005	Catalina	CSS	T_{j} (2.95)	4.0 km	MPC · JPL
154995	2005 MD_{41}	—	June 30, 2005	Palomar	NEAT	·	1.3 km	MPC · JPL
154996	2005 MY_{42}	—	June 29, 2005	Palomar	NEAT	·	950 m	MPC · JPL
154997 Marstream	2005 NF_{1}	Marstream	July 2, 2005	Kambah	Herald, D.	H	1.2 km	MPC · JPL
154998 Anneadkins	2005 NN_{1}	Anneadkins	July 1, 2005	Catalina	CSS	NYS	1.6 km	MPC · JPL
154999	2005 NV_{28}	—	July 5, 2005	Palomar	NEAT	(2076)	1.3 km	MPC · JPL
155000	2005 NJ_{29}	—	July 7, 2005	Socorro	LINEAR	·	3.5 km	MPC · JPL

back to top

== See also ==
- Meanings of minor-planet names: 154001–155000
