= Meanings of minor-planet names: 154001–155000 =

As minor planet discoveries are confirmed, they are given a permanent number by the IAU's Minor Planet Center (MPC), and the discoverers can then submit names for them, following the IAU's naming conventions. The list below concerns those minor planets in the specified number-range that have received names, and explains the meanings of those names.

Official naming citations of newly named small Solar System bodies are approved and published in a bulletin by IAU's Working Group for Small Bodies Nomenclature (WGSBN). Before May 2021, citations were published in MPC's Minor Planet Circulars for many decades. Recent citations can also be found on the JPL Small-Body Database (SBDB). Until his death in 2016, German astronomer Lutz D. Schmadel compiled these citations into the Dictionary of Minor Planet Names (DMP) and regularly updated the collection.

Based on Paul Herget's The Names of the Minor Planets, Schmadel also researched the unclear origin of numerous asteroids, most of which had been named prior to World War II. This article incorporates text from this source, which is in the public domain: SBDB New namings may only be added to this list below after official publication as the preannouncement of names is condemned. The WGSBN publishes a comprehensive guideline for the naming rules of non-cometary small Solar System bodies.

== 154001–154100 ==
Named minor planet	Provisional	This minor planet was named for...	Ref · Catalog
154004 Haolei	2002 AW_{205}	Lei Hao (born 1976), Chinese astronomer with the Sloan Digital Sky Survey	JPL · 154004
154005 Hughharris	2002 AU_{206}	Hugh Harris (born 1947), American astronomer with the Sloan Digital Sky Survey with stellar parallax measurements and white dwarf identifications	JPL · 154005
154006 Suzannehawley	2002 AD_{207}	Suzanne Hawley (born 1960), American astronomer with the Sloan Digital Sky Survey	JPL · 154006

== 154101–154200 ==
back to top

Named minor planet	Provisional	This minor planet was named for...	Ref · Catalog
154141 Kertész	2002 EJ_{160}	André Kertész (1894–1985), Hungarian photographer	JPL · 154141

== 154201–154300 ==
back to top

Named minor planet	Provisional	This minor planet was named for...	Ref · Catalog
There are no named minor planets in this number range

== 154301–154400 ==
back to top

Named minor planet	Provisional	This minor planet was named for...	Ref · Catalog
154378 Hennessy	2002 XR_{115}	Gregory Hennessy (born 1963), American astronomer with the Sloan Digital Sky Survey	JPL · 154378

== 154401–154500 ==
back to top

Named minor planet	Provisional	This minor planet was named for...	Ref · Catalog
154493 Portisch	2003 FU_{6}	Lajos Portisch (born 1937), a Hungarian chess Grandmaster	JPL · 154493

== 154501–154600 ==
back to top

Named minor planet	Provisional	This minor planet was named for...	Ref · Catalog
154554 Heatherelliott	2003 GC_{52}	Heather A. Elliott (born 1971) is a principal scientist at the Southwest Research Institute who served as a co-investigator for plasma and solar wind science for the New Horizons mission to Pluto.	JPL · 154554
154587 Ennico	2003 KL_{22}	Kimberly Ennico Smith (born 1972), a Research Astrophysicist at NASA Ames Research Center, served as a Deputy Project Scientist for the New Horizons Mission to Pluto.	JPL · 154587

== 154601–154700 ==
back to top

Named minor planet	Provisional	This minor planet was named for...	Ref · Catalog
154660 Kavelaars	2004 FX_{29}	John J. Kavelaars (born 1966), Canadian astronomer and discoverer of minor planets	JPL · 154660

== 154701–154800 ==
back to top

Named minor planet	Provisional	This minor planet was named for...	Ref · Catalog
154714 de Schepper	2004 LU_{5}	Mieke de Schepper (1943–2003) was diagnosed with breast cancer in 1987 and died fighting against the disease	JPL · 154714

== 154801–154900 ==
back to top

Named minor planet	Provisional	This minor planet was named for...	Ref · Catalog
154865 Stefanheutz	2004 RO_{84}	Stefan Heutz (born 1980), German jurist and amateur astrophotographer	JPL · 154865

== 154901–155000 ==
back to top

Named minor planet	Provisional	This minor planet was named for...	Ref · Catalog
154902 Davidtoth	2004 RU_{247}	David Toth (born 1955), Canadian Emergency Room physician, private pilot and radio operator	JPL · 154902
154932 Sviderskiene	2004 TB_{21}	Zinaida Sviderskiene (born 1945), Lithuanian astronomer and director of the Vilnius Planetarium	JPL · 154932
154938 Besserman	2004 TX_{49}	Lawrence Besserman (born 1945), specialist in medieval and early modern periods of English Literature at the Hebrew University of Jerusalem	JPL · 154938
154991 Vinciguerra	2005 BX_{26}	Lucia Vinciguerra (born 1965), friend of Italian astronomer Andrea Boattini who co-discovered this minor planet	JPL · 154991
154997 Marstream	2005 NF_{1}	Margaret Streamer (born 1947), an amateur Australian astronomer with a career in biochemistry, and graduating university with a Master of Philosophy.	IAU · 154997
154998 Anneadkins	2005 NN_{1}	Anne Marie Adkins (b. 1954) has been an avid promoter of astronomy education and outreach since 2001. She is one of the organizers of the Texas Star Party and Eldorado Star Party in the USA, and the OzSky Star Safari in Australia, and she is a former member of the Board of Visitors at McDonald Observatory in Texas.	IAU · 154998

back to top

Preceded by 153,001–154,000	Meanings of minor-planet names List of minor planets: 154,001–155,000	Succeeded by 155,001–156,000
