= Meanings of minor-planet names: 151001–152000 =

As minor planet discoveries are confirmed, they are given a permanent number by the IAU's Minor Planet Center (MPC), and the discoverers can then submit names for them, following the IAU's naming conventions. The list below concerns those minor planets in the specified number-range that have received names, and explains the meanings of those names.

Official naming citations of newly named small Solar System bodies are approved and published in a bulletin by IAU's Working Group for Small Bodies Nomenclature (WGSBN). Before May 2021, citations were published in MPC's Minor Planet Circulars for many decades. Recent citations can also be found on the JPL Small-Body Database (SBDB). Until his death in 2016, German astronomer Lutz D. Schmadel compiled these citations into the Dictionary of Minor Planet Names (DMP) and regularly updated the collection.

Based on Paul Herget's The Names of the Minor Planets, Schmadel also researched the unclear origin of numerous asteroids, most of which had been named prior to World War II. This article incorporates text from this source, which is in the public domain: SBDB New namings may only be added to this list below after official publication as the preannouncement of names is condemned. The WGSBN publishes a comprehensive guideline for the naming rules of non-cometary small Solar System bodies.

== 151001–151100 ==
Named minor planet	Provisional	This minor planet was named for...	Ref · Catalog
There are no named minor planets in this number range

== 151101–151200 ==
back to top

Named minor planet	Provisional	This minor planet was named for...	Ref · Catalog
There are no named minor planets in this number range

== 151201–151300 ==
back to top

Named minor planet	Provisional	This minor planet was named for...	Ref · Catalog
151242 Hajós	2002 AH_{11}	Alfréd Hajós (1878–1955), Hungarian swimmer and architect	JPL · 151242
151280 Valeriorizzo	2002 AM_{188}	Valerio Rizzo, Italian classical and jazz pianist who taught at the ‘Arturo Toscanini’ Conservatoire.	IAU · 151280

== 151301–151400 ==
back to top

Named minor planet	Provisional	This minor planet was named for...	Ref · Catalog
151349 Stanleycooper	2002 CW_{270}	Stanley B. Cooper (born 1944), of Johns Hopkins University Applied Physics Laboratory, served as the lead engineer for the spacecraft time-keeping system for the New Horizons mission to Pluto.	JPL · 151349
151351 Dalleore	2002 CS_{282}	Cristina M. Dalle Ore (born 1958) is a senior scientist at the SETI Institute, who served as a composition science team member for the New Horizons mission to Pluto.	JPL · 151351
151362 Chenkegong	2002 CP_{313}	Chen Kegong (1922–2002), grandfather of Chinese astronomer Ye Quan-Zhi, who discovered this minor planet	JPL · 151362

== 151401–151500 ==
back to top

Named minor planet	Provisional	This minor planet was named for...	Ref · Catalog
151430 Nemunas	2002 FC_{14}	Nemunas River, the largest river in Lithuania	JPL · 151430

== 151501–151600 ==
back to top

Named minor planet	Provisional	This minor planet was named for...	Ref · Catalog
151590 Fan	2002 UR_{58}	Xiaohui Fan (born 1971), Chinese-American astronomer with the Sloan Digital Sky Survey who studies of the most distant quasars	JPL · 151590

== 151601–151700 ==
back to top

Named minor planet	Provisional	This minor planet was named for...	Ref · Catalog
151657 Finkbeiner	2002 XV_{115}	Douglas Finkbeiner (born 1971), American astrophysicist with the Sloan Digital Sky Survey	JPL · 151657
151659 Egerszegi	2002 YF_{3}	Krisztina Egerszegi (born 1974), Hungarian swimmer	JPL · 151659
151697 Paolobattaini	2003 AF_{84}	Paolo Battaini (1955–2013), Italian amateur astronomer at the Schiaparelli Observatory (204) in Varese and popularizer on the legacy of Giovanni Schiaparelli and of the exploration of Mars.	JPL · 151697

== 151701–151800 ==
back to top

Named minor planet	Provisional	This minor planet was named for...	Ref · Catalog
There are no named minor planets in this number range

== 151801–151900 ==
back to top

Named minor planet	Provisional	This minor planet was named for...	Ref · Catalog
151834 Mongkut	2003 FB_{122}	King Mongkut (or Rama IV, 1804–1868) was the monarch of Siam from 1851 to 1868. He embraced Western innovations and initiated the modernization of Siam, both in technology and culture, earning him the nickname "The Father of Science and Technology".	MPC · 151834
151835 Christinarichey	2003 FC_{122}	Christina Rae Richey (born 1982) is a discipline scientist for the Planetary Science Division at NASA Headquarters. She has championed the cause of minorities in science and has investigated properties of ices, silicate and carbonaceous materials	JPL · 151835

== 151901–152000 ==
back to top

Named minor planet	Provisional	This minor planet was named for...	Ref · Catalog
151997 Bauhinia	2004 JL_{1}	Bauhinia blakeana (the Hong Kong orchid tree), the Hong Kong City Flower	JPL · 151997

back to top

Preceded by 150,001–151,000	Meanings of minor-planet names List of minor planets: 151,001–152,000	Succeeded by 152,001–153,000
