= Dale Cruikshank =

American astromer and planetary scientist

Dale P. Cruikshank is an astronomer and planetary scientist in the Astrophysics Branch at NASA Ames Research Center. His research specialties are spectroscopy and radiometry of planets and small bodies in the Solar System. These small bodies include comets, asteroids, planetary satellites, dwarf planets (e.g., Pluto), and objects in the region beyond Neptune (Kuiper belt objects and trans-Neptunian bodies). He uses spectroscopic observations made with ground-based and space-based telescopes, as well as interplanetary spacecraft, to identify and study the ices, minerals, and organic materials that compose the surfaces of planets and small bodies.

Together with several colleagues, Cruikshank has found many kinds of ice on several small planetary bodies. These include frozen CH_{4}, N_{2}, CO, CO_{2}, and H_{2}O on Neptune's satellite Triton, CH_{4}, N_{2}, and CO on Pluto, H_{2}O on Pluto's satellite Charon, H_{2}O ice on many of the moons of Saturn and Uranus, H_{2}O and CH_{3}OH on the Centaur object 5145 Pholus. In studies with the Cassini spacecraft, he and his colleagues have found hydrocarbons on several of Saturn's satellites.

== Career ==
Cruikshank gained a B.S. in Physics at Iowa State University and finished his graduate studies with a Ph.D. degree at the University of Arizona in the Lunar and Planetary Laboratory as a student of Gerard Kuiper in 1968. After a year in the USSR as a National Academy of Sciences exchange scientist, he returned to Arizona for a year, and then moved to the University of Hawaii in mid-1970. As an astronomer at the Institute for Astronomy, he helped with the development of Mauna Kea as one of the most important observatory sites in the world, and used the many telescopes there for his observational studies of the bodies in the Solar System. Cruikshank joined NASA in 1988.

Cruikshank is a member of the International Astronomical Union. On IAU Commission 16 (physical studies of the planets) he served as Secretary (1995-1997), Vice-President (1998-2000), and President (2001–2003). He is also a member of the American Astronomical Society (AAS) and its Division for Planetary Sciences (DPS). He served as a member of the DPS Committee (1974-1977), Vice-Chair (1989-1990), and Chair (1990-1991). He is a Fellow of the California Academy of Sciences and a Fellow of the American Geophysical Union.

Cruikshank has served on numerous NASA review panels and committees of both NASA and the National Research Council. He was the Chair of the Primitive Bodies Panel of the first Solar System Decadal Survey (report published in 2003), and served on the Steering Committee of the second Solar System Decadal Survey. The report of the second decadal survey was published in 2011, with the title, "Vision and Voyages for Planetary Science in the Decade 2013-2022".

In 2016, Cruikshank co‑authored the book Discovering Pluto: Exploration of a Distant World with historian William Sheehan, published by the University of Arizona Press.

== Honors and awards ==
- 1985 - Muhlmann Prize of the Astronomical Society of the Pacific (for the best research work at Mauna Kea Observatories)
- 1994 - NASA Medal for Exceptional Scientific Achievement (recognizing research on organic matter in the Solar System)
- 2006 - NASA Medal for Exceptional Service
- 2006 - Kuiper Prize of the Division for Planetary Sciences, American Astronomical Society.
- Manned Flight Awareness Award, NASA Ames Research Center
- Honor Award-Scientist, NASA Ames Research Center
- Group Achievement Award, Infrared Spectrometer Team (IRIS) on the Voyager Mission at Saturn
- Group Achievement Award, Infrared Spectrometer Team (IRIS) on the Voyager Mission at Uranus
- Group Achievement Award, Infrared Spectrometer Team (IRIS) on the Voyager Mission at Neptune
- Elected Fellow, California Academy of Science
- NASA Group Achievement Award for work on Cassini VIMS team
- 2019 – NASA Medal for Exceptional Scientific Achievement
- 2020 - Elected a Legacy Fellow of the American Astronomical Society
- 2023 – Harold Masursky Award of the Division for Planetary Sciences, American Astronomical Society

In 1988, asteroid 3531 Cruikshank was named after him by the International Astronomical Union, recognizing excellence in research on Solar System topics, and the outreach for scientific exchange with the USSR.

== Selected publications ==
- Stansberry, J. A.; Grundy, W. M.; Margot, J. L.; Cruikshank, D. P.; Emery, J. P.; Rieke, G. H.; Trilling, D. E. (2006) The Albedo, Size, and Density of Binary Kuiper Belt Object (47171) 1999 TC36. ApJ., 643, 556.
- Brown, Robert H.; Clark, Roger N.; Buratti, Bonnie J.; Cruikshank, Dale P.; Barnes, Jason W.; Mastrapa, Rachel M. E.; Bauer, J.; Newman, S.; Momary, T.; Baines, K. H.; and 15 coauthors (2006) Composition and Physical Properties of Enceladus' Surface, Science Volume 311, Issue 5766, pp. 1425–1428. Available online.
- Bernstein, M. P.; Cruikshank, D. P.; Sandford, S. A. (2006) Near-infrared laboratory spectra of CH_{4} in Solid H2O. Icarus Volume 181, Issue 1, March 2006, Pages 302-30 Available online.
- Brown, R. H.; Baines, K. H.; Bellucci, G.; Buratti, B. J.; Capaccioni, F.; Cerroni, P.; Clark, R. N.; Coradini, A.; Cruikshank, D. P.; Drossart, P.; and 16 coauthors (2006) Observations in the Saturn system during approach and orbital insertion, with Cassini's visual and infrared mapping spectrometer (VIMS). Astronomy and Astrophysics, Volume 446, Issue 2, February I 2006, pp. 707–716. Available online.
- Clark, R. N. and the Cassini VIMS Team. (2005) Compositional mapping of Saturn's moon Phoebe with imaging spectroscopy. Nature, 435, 66-69.
- Cruikshank, D. P., Barucci, M.A., Emery, J. P., Fernandez, Y., R., Grundy, W., G., Noll, K. S., and Stansberry, J. A. 2007. Physical Properties of Transneptunian Objects. In Protostars and Planets - V, B. Reipurth, D. Jewitt, and K. Keil, eds., Univ. Arizona Press. 879-893.
- Chaban, G. M., Bernsterin, M., and Cruikshank, D. P. 2007. Carbon dioxide on planetary bodies: Theoretical and experimental studies of molecular complexes. Icarus 187, 592-599.
- Emery, J. P., Dalle Ore, C. M., Cruikshank, D. P., Fernandez, Y. R., Trilling, D. E., and Stransberry, J. A., 2007. Ices on (90377) Sedna: Confirmation and compositional constraints. Astron. Astrophys. 466, 395-398.
- Cruikshank, D. P., Dalton, J. B., Dalle Ore, C., Bauer, J., Stephan, K., et al. (Cassini VIMS and UVS Teams). 2007. Composition of Hyperion. Nature 448, 54-56.
- Grundy, W. M., Stansberry, J. A., Noll, K. S., Stephens, D.C., Trilling, D. E., Kern, S. D., Spencer, J. R., Cruikshank, D. P., and Levison, H. F. 2007. The orbit, mass, size, albedo, and density of (65489) Ceto-Phorcys: A tidally evolved binary Centaur. Icarus 191, 286-297.
- Soderblom, L. et al. (including Cruiksank). 2007. Correlations between Cassini VIMS spectra and Radar SAR images: Implications for Titan's surface composition and the character of the Huygens probe landing site. Planet. Space Sci. 55, 2025-2036.
- Cruikshank, D. P., Wegryn, E., Dalle Ore, C. M., Brown, R. H., Baines, K. H., Bibring, J.-P., Burati, B. J., Clark, R. N., McCord, T. B., Nicholson, P. D., Pendleton, Y. J., Owen, T. C., Filacchione, G., Coradini, A., Cerroni, P., Capaccioni, F., Jaumann, R., Nelson, R. M., Baines, K. H., Sotin, C., Bellucci, G., Combes, M., Langevin, Y., Sicardy, B., Matson, D. L., Formisano, V., Drossart, P., Menella, V. 2008. Hydrocarbons on Saturn's satellites Iapetus and Phoebe. Icarus 193, 334-343.
- Clark, R. N., Brown, R. H., Jaumann, R., Cruikshank, D. P., Buratti, B., Baines, K. H., Nelson, R. M., Nicholson, P. D., Moore, J. M., Curchin, J., M., Hoefen, T., and Stephan, K. 2008. Compositional mapping of Saturn's satellite Dion with Cassini VIMS and the implications of dark material in the Saturn system. Icarus 193, 372-386
- Nicholson, P. D., Hedman, M. M., Clark, R. N., Showalter, M. R., Cruikshank, D. P., Cuzzi, J. N., Filacchione, G., Capaccioni, F., Cerroni, P., Hansen, G. B., Sicardy, B., Drossart, P., Brown, R. H., Buratti, B., J., Baines, K. H., and Coradini, A. 2008. A close look at Saturn's rings with Cassini VIMS. Icarus 193, 182-212.
- Buratti, B. J., Soderlund, K., Bauer, J., Mosher, J. A., Hicks, M. D., Simonelli, D., P., Jaumann, R., Clark, R. N., Brown, R. H., Cruikshank, D. P.,. and Momary, T. 2008. Infrared (0.83-5.1 mm) photometry of Phoebe from the Cassini Visual Infrared Mapping Spectrometer. Icarus 193, 309-322.
- de Bergh, C., Schmitt, B., Moroz, L. V., Quirico, E., and Cruikshank, D. P. Laboratory data on ices, refractory carbonaceous materials and minerals relevant to transneptunian objects and centaurs. 2008. In The Solar System Beyond Neptune (M. A. Barucci et al., Eds). pp. 483–506
- Dotto, E., Emery, J. P., Barucci, M. A., Morbidelli, A., and Cruikshank, D. P. De Troianis - The Trojans in the Planetary System. 2008. In The Solar System Beyond Neptune (M. A. Barucci et al., Eds). pp. 383–395.
- Stansberry, J. A., Grundy, W., Brown, M., Cruikshank, D. P., Spencer, J., Trilling, D., and Margot, J.-L. 2008. Physical properties or Kuiper Belt Objects and Centaurs: Constraints from Spitzer Space Telescope. In The Solar System Beyond Neptune (M. A. Barucci et al., Eds). pp. 161–179.
- Barucci, M. A., Boehnhardt, H., Cruikshank, D. P., and Morbidelli, A., Editors. The Solar System Beyond Neptune. 2008. University of Arizona Press, Tucson. 592 pp.
- Mastrapa, R. M., Bernstein, M. P., Sandford, S. A., Roush, T. L., Cruikshank, D. P., and Dalle Ore, C. M. 2008. Optical constants of amorphous and crystalline H_{2}O-ice in the far infrared from 1.1 to 2.6 mm. Icarus 197, 307-320.
- Protopapa, S., Boehnhardt, H., Herbst, T. M., Cruikshank, D. P., Grundy, W. M., Merlin, F., and Olkin, C. B. 2008. Surface characterization of Pluto and Charon by L and M band spectra. Astron. & Astrophysics. 490, 365-375.
- Cruikshank, D. P. 2008. Organic matter in the Solar System: From colors to spectral bands. Organic Matter in Space, (S. Kwok, S. A. Sandford, Eds.) Proc. IAU Symp. 251, pp. 119–125.
- Mastrapa, R. M., Sandford, S. A., Roush, T. L., Cruikshank, D. P., and Dalle Ore, C. M. Optical constants of amorphous and crystalline H_{2}Oices: 2.5–22 mm (4000–455 cm-1). Astrophys. J. 701, 1347-1356.
- Dalle Ore, C. M., Barucci, M. A., Emery, J. P., Cruikshank, D. P., Dalle Ore, L. V., Merlin, F., Alvarez-Candal, A., de Bergh, C., Trilling, D. E., Perna, D., Fornasier, S., Mastrapa, R. M. E., and Dotto, E. Composition of KBO (50000) Quaoar. Astron. & Astrophys. 501, 349-357.
- Cruikshank, D. P., Meyer, A. W., Brown, R. H., Clark, R. N., Jaumann, R., Stephan, K. Hibbitts, C. A., Sandford, S. A., Mastrapa, R. M. E., Filacchione, G., Dalle Ore, C. M., Nicholson, P. D., Buratti, B. J., McCord, TY. B., Nelson, R. M., Dalton, J. B., Baines, K. H., and Matson, D. L. 2009. Carbon dioxide on the satellites of Saturn: Results from the Cassini VIMS investigation and revisions to the VIMS wavelength scale. Icarus 206, 561-572.
- Cruikshank, D. P., Emery, J. P., Kornei, K. A., Bellucci, G., Formisano, V., d'Aversa, E. 2010. Io: Time-resolved near-infrared spectroscopy (1.9-4.2 mm) of eclipse reappearances. Icarus 205, 516-527.
- Dalton, J. B., Cruikshank, D. P., Stephan, K., McCord, T. B., Coustenis, A., Carlson, R. W., Coradini, A. 2010. Chemical composition of icy satellite surfaces. In Space Sci. Rev. 153, 113-154. Also published as an ISSI volume: Satellites of the Outer Solar System, O. Grasset, M. Blanc, A. Coustenis, W. B. Durham, H. Hussmann, R. T. Pappalardo, D. Turrini, Eds. Springer, pp. 111–152, 2010.
- Clark, R. N.; Curchin, J. M.; Barnes, J. W.; Jaumann, R.; Soderblom, L.; Cruikshank, D. P.; Brown, R. H.; Rodriguez, S.; Lunine, Jonathan I.; Stephan, K.; Hoefen, T. M.; Le Mouelic, S.; Sotin, C.; Baines, K. H.; Buratti, B. J.; Nicholson, P. D.; 2010, "Detection and mapping of hydrocarbon deposits on Titan", J. Geophys. Res. 115, E10005
- Emery, J. P., Burr, D. M., Cruikshank, D. P. 2011. Near-infrared spectroscopy of Trojan asteroids: Evidence for two compositional groups. Astron. J. 141, 25-
- Lellouch, E., Stansberry, J., Emery, J., Grundy, W., Cruikshank, D. P., 2011. Thermal properties of Pluto's and Charon's surfaces from Spitzer Observations. Icarus 214, 701-716.
- Pinilla-Alonso, N., Roush, T. L. Marzo, G. A., Cruikshank, D. P., Dalle Ore, C. M. 2011. Iapetus surface variability revealed from statistical clustering of a VIMS mosaic: The distribution of CO_{2}. Icarus 215, 75-82.
- Dalle Ore, C. M., Fulchignoni, M., Cruikshank, D. P., Barucci, M. A., Brunetto, R., Campins, H., de Bergh, C., Debes, J. H., Dotto, E., Emery, J. P., Grundy, W. M., Jones, A. P., Mennella, V., Orthous-Daunay, F. R., Owen, T., Pascucci, I., Pendleton, Y. J., Pinilla-Alonso, N., Quirico, E., Strazzulla, G. 2011. Organic materials in planetary and protoplanetary systems: Nature or nurture? Astron. Astrophys. 533 A98
- Imanaka, H., Cruikshank, D. P., Khare, B. N., McKay, C. P. 2012. Optical constants of laboratory synthesized complex organic materials: Part 1. Titan tholins at mid-infrared wavelengths (2.5–25 mm). Icarus 218, 247-261.
- Cruikshank, Dale P.; Sheehan, William (2016). Discovering Pluto: Exploration of a Distant World. Tucson: University of Arizona Press. ISBN 978-0-8165-3938-3
- Cruikshank, D. P.; Materese, C. K.; Pendleton, Y. J.; Boston, P. J.; et al. (2019). Prebiotic chemistry of Pluto. Astrobiology, 19(7), 831–848.
- Cruikshank, D. P.; Umurhan, O. M.; Beyer, R. A.; et al. (2019). Recent cryovolcanism in Virgil Fossae on Pluto. Icarus, 330, 155–168.
