= Cristina Dalle Ore =

Hyperspectral imaging and remote sensing expert

Cristina Morea Dalle Ore (born 1958) is a hyperspectral imaging and remote sensing expert, originally from Italy. After many years as an astronomer and planetary scientist, she has shifted her interests to Earth-based agricultural applications of remote sensing, as Head of Remote Science and Geospatial Intelligence for Bayer Crop Science. Her work in astronomy studied the chemical composition of objects in the far reaches of the Solar System, with a special focus on tholins, and included the discovery of ammonia on Pluto, suggesting the possibility of liquid water there as well.

== Education and career ==
Dalle Ore is originally from Treviso; astronomy was a shared interest with her father, heart surgeon Mario Morea. She earned a laurea in astronomy, the Italian equivalent of a master's degree, from the University of Padua, in 1983. Next, she began graduate studies with Sandra Faber at the University of California, Santa Cruz, but was pulled away to Boston by her new husband's job there. After spending nine years raising three children and studying spectroscopy at Harvard University, she returned to UC Santa Cruz to complete her Ph.D. Her 1993 dissertation, A critical examination of stellar atmosphere theory for metal-poor K-giant stars, was supervised by Faber.

Despite her early research focus on stars, a chance social connection with planetary scientist Dale Cruikshank led her to a position studying the Solar System as a research scientist for the SETI Institute and NASA Ames Research Center. She worked there beginning in 1996, with a stint as a lecturer at UC Santa Cruz from 2007 to 2008, until taking her present position at Bayer Crop Science.

== Recognition ==
Minor planets 25945 Moreadalleore and 151351 Dalleore are named for Dalle Ore.
