= List of minor planets: 151001–152000 =

The following is a partial list of minor planets, running from minor-planet number 151001 through 152000, inclusive. The primary data for this and other partial lists is based on JPL's "Small-Body Orbital Elements" and data available from the Minor Planet Center. Critical list information is also provided by the MPC, unless otherwise specified from Lowell Observatory. A detailed description of the table's columns and additional sources are given on the main page including a complete list of every page in this series, and a statistical break-up on the dynamical classification of minor planets.

Also see the summary list of all named bodies in numerical and alphabetical order, and the corresponding naming citations for the number range of this particular list. New namings may only be added to this list after official publication, as the preannouncement of names is condemned by the Working Group for Small Bodies Nomenclature of the International Astronomical Union.

Near-Earth obj.	MBA (inner)	MBA (outer)	Centaur
Mars-crosser	MBA (middle)	Jupiter trojan	Trans-Neptunian obj.
Unclassified

== 151001–151100 ==
Designation			Discovery			Properties		Ref
Permanent	Provisional	Named after	Date	Site	Discoverer(s)	Category	Diam.	Ref
151001	2001 UQ_{39}	—	October 17, 2001	Socorro	LINEAR	(12739)	2.6 km	MPC · JPL
151002	2001 UF_{57}	—	October 17, 2001	Socorro	LINEAR	·	1.4 km	MPC · JPL
151003	2001 UZ_{58}	—	October 17, 2001	Socorro	LINEAR	KON	4.1 km	MPC · JPL
151004	2001 UA_{59}	—	October 17, 2001	Socorro	LINEAR	NYS	1.4 km	MPC · JPL
151005	2001 UL_{68}	—	October 20, 2001	Socorro	LINEAR	·	2.3 km	MPC · JPL
151006	2001 UB_{72}	—	October 17, 2001	Haleakala	NEAT	·	2.7 km	MPC · JPL
151007	2001 UJ_{73}	—	October 17, 2001	Socorro	LINEAR	·	1.9 km	MPC · JPL
151008	2001 UR_{80}	—	October 20, 2001	Socorro	LINEAR	MAR	1.6 km	MPC · JPL
151009	2001 UD_{81}	—	October 20, 2001	Socorro	LINEAR	·	2.2 km	MPC · JPL
151010	2001 UT_{81}	—	October 20, 2001	Socorro	LINEAR	MAR	1.8 km	MPC · JPL
151011	2001 UK_{83}	—	October 20, 2001	Socorro	LINEAR	·	2.1 km	MPC · JPL
151012	2001 US_{92}	—	October 18, 2001	Palomar	NEAT	·	2.8 km	MPC · JPL
151013	2001 UE_{101}	—	October 20, 2001	Socorro	LINEAR	·	1.7 km	MPC · JPL
151014	2001 UB_{113}	—	October 21, 2001	Socorro	LINEAR	(5)	2.2 km	MPC · JPL
151015	2001 UC_{113}	—	October 21, 2001	Socorro	LINEAR	·	2.6 km	MPC · JPL
151016	2001 UO_{113}	—	October 22, 2001	Socorro	LINEAR	·	2.6 km	MPC · JPL
151017	2001 UC_{114}	—	October 22, 2001	Socorro	LINEAR	·	2.4 km	MPC · JPL
151018	2001 UV_{116}	—	October 22, 2001	Socorro	LINEAR	·	2.4 km	MPC · JPL
151019	2001 UF_{119}	—	October 22, 2001	Socorro	LINEAR	·	3.9 km	MPC · JPL
151020	2001 UU_{120}	—	October 22, 2001	Socorro	LINEAR	·	2.6 km	MPC · JPL
151021	2001 UU_{123}	—	October 22, 2001	Palomar	NEAT	·	4.7 km	MPC · JPL
151022	2001 UH_{126}	—	October 23, 2001	Palomar	NEAT	·	2.4 km	MPC · JPL
151023	2001 UT_{126}	—	October 17, 2001	Socorro	LINEAR	(5)	2.4 km	MPC · JPL
151024	2001 UV_{126}	—	October 17, 2001	Socorro	LINEAR	·	2.7 km	MPC · JPL
151025	2001 UD_{144}	—	October 23, 2001	Socorro	LINEAR	·	3.8 km	MPC · JPL
151026	2001 UD_{145}	—	October 23, 2001	Socorro	LINEAR	·	2.3 km	MPC · JPL
151027	2001 UA_{146}	—	October 23, 2001	Socorro	LINEAR	·	2.4 km	MPC · JPL
151028	2001 UM_{146}	—	October 23, 2001	Socorro	LINEAR	·	2.4 km	MPC · JPL
151029	2001 UT_{154}	—	October 23, 2001	Socorro	LINEAR	·	3.7 km	MPC · JPL
151030	2001 UC_{156}	—	October 23, 2001	Socorro	LINEAR	·	1.7 km	MPC · JPL
151031	2001 UG_{167}	—	October 19, 2001	Socorro	LINEAR	·	3.7 km	MPC · JPL
151032	2001 UM_{169}	—	October 19, 2001	Socorro	LINEAR	(1547)	4.2 km	MPC · JPL
151033	2001 UJ_{170}	—	October 21, 2001	Socorro	LINEAR	(5)	2.3 km	MPC · JPL
151034	2001 UX_{173}	—	October 18, 2001	Palomar	NEAT	·	1.7 km	MPC · JPL
151035	2001 UQ_{179}	—	October 26, 2001	Haleakala	NEAT	JUN	1.6 km	MPC · JPL
151036	2001 UE_{182}	—	October 16, 2001	Palomar	NEAT	·	3.0 km	MPC · JPL
151037	2001 UZ_{182}	—	October 16, 2001	Socorro	LINEAR	·	2.2 km	MPC · JPL
151038	2001 UL_{191}	—	October 18, 2001	Palomar	NEAT	NYS	1.6 km	MPC · JPL
151039	2001 UW_{198}	—	October 19, 2001	Palomar	NEAT	·	1.8 km	MPC · JPL
151040	2001 UT_{201}	—	October 19, 2001	Palomar	NEAT	·	1.9 km	MPC · JPL
151041	2001 UX_{201}	—	October 19, 2001	Palomar	NEAT	·	1.5 km	MPC · JPL
151042	2001 UR_{205}	—	October 19, 2001	Palomar	NEAT	·	1.9 km	MPC · JPL
151043	2001 UU_{205}	—	October 19, 2001	Palomar	NEAT	·	3.0 km	MPC · JPL
151044	2001 UX_{205}	—	October 19, 2001	Palomar	NEAT	·	3.0 km	MPC · JPL
151045	2001 UL_{216}	—	October 24, 2001	Socorro	LINEAR	·	3.6 km	MPC · JPL
151046	2001 UX_{219}	—	October 18, 2001	Kitt Peak	Spacewatch	·	2.2 km	MPC · JPL
151047	2001 UB_{220}	—	October 19, 2001	Socorro	LINEAR	·	3.2 km	MPC · JPL
151048	2001 UO_{220}	—	October 21, 2001	Socorro	LINEAR	·	1.8 km	MPC · JPL
151049	2001 UK_{221}	—	October 23, 2001	Socorro	LINEAR	MIS	3.2 km	MPC · JPL
151050	2001 UW_{222}	—	October 24, 2001	Kitt Peak	Spacewatch	·	3.0 km	MPC · JPL
151051	2001 UC_{225}	—	October 25, 2001	Socorro	LINEAR	·	2.0 km	MPC · JPL
151052	2001 VN_{1}	—	November 9, 2001	Palomar	NEAT	·	1.7 km	MPC · JPL
151053	2001 VS_{6}	—	November 9, 2001	Socorro	LINEAR	·	2.3 km	MPC · JPL
151054	2001 VW_{6}	—	November 9, 2001	Socorro	LINEAR	·	2.0 km	MPC · JPL
151055	2001 VV_{11}	—	November 10, 2001	Socorro	LINEAR	·	2.4 km	MPC · JPL
151056	2001 VO_{13}	—	November 10, 2001	Socorro	LINEAR	·	3.3 km	MPC · JPL
151057	2001 VO_{14}	—	November 10, 2001	Socorro	LINEAR	·	3.2 km	MPC · JPL
151058	2001 VP_{14}	—	November 10, 2001	Socorro	LINEAR	·	2.8 km	MPC · JPL
151059	2001 VF_{18}	—	November 9, 2001	Socorro	LINEAR	·	1.8 km	MPC · JPL
151060	2001 VA_{19}	—	November 9, 2001	Socorro	LINEAR	·	5.5 km	MPC · JPL
151061	2001 VQ_{19}	—	November 9, 2001	Socorro	LINEAR	·	3.6 km	MPC · JPL
151062	2001 VP_{28}	—	November 9, 2001	Socorro	LINEAR	(5)	2.3 km	MPC · JPL
151063	2001 VH_{29}	—	November 9, 2001	Socorro	LINEAR	·	2.4 km	MPC · JPL
151064	2001 VP_{29}	—	November 9, 2001	Socorro	LINEAR	·	3.1 km	MPC · JPL
151065	2001 VV_{29}	—	November 9, 2001	Socorro	LINEAR	·	3.0 km	MPC · JPL
151066	2001 VP_{31}	—	November 9, 2001	Socorro	LINEAR	·	4.3 km	MPC · JPL
151067	2001 VP_{35}	—	November 9, 2001	Socorro	LINEAR	GEF	2.3 km	MPC · JPL
151068	2001 VJ_{36}	—	November 9, 2001	Socorro	LINEAR	(5)	2.2 km	MPC · JPL
151069	2001 VL_{37}	—	November 9, 2001	Socorro	LINEAR	(5)	2.8 km	MPC · JPL
151070	2001 VU_{49}	—	November 10, 2001	Socorro	LINEAR	EUN	2.0 km	MPC · JPL
151071	2001 VY_{49}	—	November 10, 2001	Socorro	LINEAR	KON	3.8 km	MPC · JPL
151072	2001 VE_{50}	—	November 10, 2001	Socorro	LINEAR	ADE	5.2 km	MPC · JPL
151073	2001 VF_{50}	—	November 10, 2001	Socorro	LINEAR	slow	4.1 km	MPC · JPL
151074	2001 VV_{57}	—	November 10, 2001	Socorro	LINEAR	·	2.6 km	MPC · JPL
151075	2001 VD_{60}	—	November 10, 2001	Socorro	LINEAR	SUL	4.0 km	MPC · JPL
151076	2001 VD_{61}	—	November 10, 2001	Socorro	LINEAR	·	5.6 km	MPC · JPL
151077	2001 VC_{63}	—	November 10, 2001	Socorro	LINEAR	·	3.2 km	MPC · JPL
151078	2001 VD_{64}	—	November 10, 2001	Socorro	LINEAR	·	3.2 km	MPC · JPL
151079	2001 VP_{64}	—	November 10, 2001	Socorro	LINEAR	·	8.7 km	MPC · JPL
151080	2001 VD_{65}	—	November 10, 2001	Socorro	LINEAR	·	2.7 km	MPC · JPL
151081	2001 VA_{74}	—	November 11, 2001	Socorro	LINEAR	·	2.7 km	MPC · JPL
151082	2001 VK_{74}	—	November 12, 2001	Socorro	LINEAR	·	2.9 km	MPC · JPL
151083	2001 VM_{79}	—	November 9, 2001	Palomar	NEAT	·	2.5 km	MPC · JPL
151084	2001 VG_{81}	—	November 12, 2001	Haleakala	NEAT	·	3.0 km	MPC · JPL
151085	2001 VK_{83}	—	November 10, 2001	Socorro	LINEAR	HOF	4.5 km	MPC · JPL
151086	2001 VE_{84}	—	November 11, 2001	Socorro	LINEAR	(5)	2.3 km	MPC · JPL
151087	2001 VH_{84}	—	November 12, 2001	Socorro	LINEAR	·	2.7 km	MPC · JPL
151088	2001 VG_{91}	—	November 15, 2001	Socorro	LINEAR	BRG	2.5 km	MPC · JPL
151089	2001 VB_{92}	—	November 15, 2001	Socorro	LINEAR	·	3.1 km	MPC · JPL
151090	2001 VU_{94}	—	November 15, 2001	Socorro	LINEAR	·	5.0 km	MPC · JPL
151091	2001 VF_{95}	—	November 15, 2001	Socorro	LINEAR	·	3.7 km	MPC · JPL
151092	2001 VZ_{97}	—	November 15, 2001	Socorro	LINEAR	·	4.0 km	MPC · JPL
151093	2001 VE_{99}	—	November 15, 2001	Socorro	LINEAR	·	3.4 km	MPC · JPL
151094	2001 VX_{100}	—	November 12, 2001	Socorro	LINEAR	·	2.6 km	MPC · JPL
151095	2001 VA_{103}	—	November 12, 2001	Socorro	LINEAR	·	2.2 km	MPC · JPL
151096	2001 VS_{103}	—	November 12, 2001	Socorro	LINEAR	·	2.1 km	MPC · JPL
151097	2001 VN_{108}	—	November 12, 2001	Socorro	LINEAR	(5)	2.0 km	MPC · JPL
151098	2001 VH_{109}	—	November 12, 2001	Socorro	LINEAR	·	2.0 km	MPC · JPL
151099	2001 VX_{113}	—	November 12, 2001	Socorro	LINEAR	(5)	2.4 km	MPC · JPL
151100	2001 VP_{116}	—	November 12, 2001	Socorro	LINEAR	·	2.0 km	MPC · JPL

== 151101–151200 ==
back to top

Designation			Discovery			Properties		Ref
Permanent	Provisional	Named after	Date	Site	Discoverer(s)	Category	Diam.	Ref
151101	2001 VN_{119}	—	November 12, 2001	Socorro	LINEAR	·	2.1 km	MPC · JPL
151102	2001 VB_{124}	—	November 10, 2001	Palomar	NEAT	·	2.7 km	MPC · JPL
151103	2001 VV_{132}	—	November 13, 2001	Haleakala	NEAT	EOS	3.4 km	MPC · JPL
151104	2001 WH_{6}	—	November 17, 2001	Socorro	LINEAR	BRG	2.8 km	MPC · JPL
151105	2001 WM_{9}	—	November 17, 2001	Socorro	LINEAR	MAR	2.2 km	MPC · JPL
151106	2001 WR_{12}	—	November 17, 2001	Socorro	LINEAR	·	3.4 km	MPC · JPL
151107	2001 WW_{14}	—	November 17, 2001	Kitt Peak	Spacewatch	·	2.5 km	MPC · JPL
151108	2001 WK_{16}	—	November 17, 2001	Socorro	LINEAR	·	4.5 km	MPC · JPL
151109	2001 WB_{23}	—	November 27, 2001	Socorro	LINEAR	·	5.2 km	MPC · JPL
151110	2001 WZ_{28}	—	November 17, 2001	Socorro	LINEAR	NEM	4.9 km	MPC · JPL
151111	2001 WX_{29}	—	November 17, 2001	Socorro	LINEAR	·	2.2 km	MPC · JPL
151112	2001 WZ_{31}	—	November 17, 2001	Socorro	LINEAR	·	2.5 km	MPC · JPL
151113	2001 WG_{32}	—	November 17, 2001	Socorro	LINEAR	·	1.7 km	MPC · JPL
151114	2001 WS_{33}	—	November 17, 2001	Socorro	LINEAR	·	2.5 km	MPC · JPL
151115	2001 WU_{33}	—	November 17, 2001	Socorro	LINEAR	·	2.3 km	MPC · JPL
151116	2001 WW_{33}	—	November 17, 2001	Socorro	LINEAR	·	2.3 km	MPC · JPL
151117	2001 WY_{33}	—	November 17, 2001	Socorro	LINEAR	·	2.4 km	MPC · JPL
151118	2001 WZ_{47}	—	November 19, 2001	Anderson Mesa	LONEOS	·	3.2 km	MPC · JPL
151119	2001 WD_{51}	—	November 19, 2001	Socorro	LINEAR	HOF	3.5 km	MPC · JPL
151120	2001 WT_{52}	—	November 19, 2001	Socorro	LINEAR	·	3.1 km	MPC · JPL
151121	2001 WT_{54}	—	November 19, 2001	Socorro	LINEAR	·	1.8 km	MPC · JPL
151122	2001 WU_{56}	—	November 19, 2001	Socorro	LINEAR	·	1.9 km	MPC · JPL
151123	2001 WY_{63}	—	November 19, 2001	Socorro	LINEAR	(12739)	2.4 km	MPC · JPL
151124	2001 WL_{94}	—	November 20, 2001	Socorro	LINEAR	·	2.2 km	MPC · JPL
151125	2001 WF_{101}	—	November 17, 2001	Kitt Peak	Spacewatch	·	2.5 km	MPC · JPL
151126	2001 XD_{2}	—	December 8, 2001	Socorro	LINEAR	HNS	1.9 km	MPC · JPL
151127	2001 XO_{2}	—	December 8, 2001	Socorro	LINEAR	·	3.5 km	MPC · JPL
151128	2001 XK_{5}	—	December 5, 2001	Haleakala	NEAT	·	2.5 km	MPC · JPL
151129	2001 XO_{6}	—	December 8, 2001	Socorro	LINEAR	EUN	3.0 km	MPC · JPL
151130	2001 XH_{12}	—	December 9, 2001	Socorro	LINEAR	·	3.6 km	MPC · JPL
151131	2001 XJ_{14}	—	December 9, 2001	Socorro	LINEAR	·	4.0 km	MPC · JPL
151132	2001 XP_{18}	—	December 9, 2001	Socorro	LINEAR	·	2.8 km	MPC · JPL
151133	2001 XA_{21}	—	December 9, 2001	Socorro	LINEAR	·	3.4 km	MPC · JPL
151134	2001 XT_{23}	—	December 9, 2001	Socorro	LINEAR	GEF	2.2 km	MPC · JPL
151135	2001 XH_{33}	—	December 10, 2001	Kitt Peak	Spacewatch	·	3.7 km	MPC · JPL
151136	2001 XZ_{34}	—	December 9, 2001	Socorro	LINEAR	EUN	2.7 km	MPC · JPL
151137	2001 XH_{37}	—	December 9, 2001	Socorro	LINEAR	·	4.8 km	MPC · JPL
151138	2001 XL_{40}	—	December 9, 2001	Socorro	LINEAR	·	2.7 km	MPC · JPL
151139	2001 XJ_{41}	—	December 9, 2001	Socorro	LINEAR	·	5.1 km	MPC · JPL
151140	2001 XX_{41}	—	December 9, 2001	Socorro	LINEAR	·	3.2 km	MPC · JPL
151141	2001 XG_{43}	—	December 9, 2001	Socorro	LINEAR	·	3.6 km	MPC · JPL
151142	2001 XP_{43}	—	December 9, 2001	Socorro	LINEAR	·	6.0 km	MPC · JPL
151143	2001 XQ_{47}	—	December 9, 2001	Socorro	LINEAR	·	6.3 km	MPC · JPL
151144	2001 XG_{48}	—	December 10, 2001	Socorro	LINEAR	·	3.1 km	MPC · JPL
151145	2001 XT_{49}	—	December 10, 2001	Socorro	LINEAR	·	2.3 km	MPC · JPL
151146	2001 XH_{53}	—	December 10, 2001	Socorro	LINEAR	·	2.6 km	MPC · JPL
151147	2001 XZ_{54}	—	December 10, 2001	Socorro	LINEAR	·	2.8 km	MPC · JPL
151148	2001 XP_{58}	—	December 10, 2001	Socorro	LINEAR	DOR	3.3 km	MPC · JPL
151149	2001 XK_{59}	—	December 10, 2001	Socorro	LINEAR	·	2.7 km	MPC · JPL
151150	2001 XM_{59}	—	December 10, 2001	Socorro	LINEAR	·	2.4 km	MPC · JPL
151151	2001 XS_{74}	—	December 11, 2001	Socorro	LINEAR	·	3.3 km	MPC · JPL
151152	2001 XC_{75}	—	December 11, 2001	Socorro	LINEAR	·	2.6 km	MPC · JPL
151153	2001 XJ_{78}	—	December 11, 2001	Socorro	LINEAR	·	2.1 km	MPC · JPL
151154	2001 XD_{89}	—	December 10, 2001	Socorro	LINEAR	·	2.8 km	MPC · JPL
151155	2001 XL_{92}	—	December 10, 2001	Socorro	LINEAR	·	2.6 km	MPC · JPL
151156	2001 XK_{102}	—	December 11, 2001	Socorro	LINEAR	MRX	1.7 km	MPC · JPL
151157	2001 XA_{105}	—	December 14, 2001	Kitt Peak	Spacewatch	·	2.8 km	MPC · JPL
151158	2001 XD_{113}	—	December 11, 2001	Socorro	LINEAR	·	2.5 km	MPC · JPL
151159	2001 XR_{126}	—	December 14, 2001	Socorro	LINEAR	·	2.2 km	MPC · JPL
151160	2001 XJ_{130}	—	December 14, 2001	Socorro	LINEAR	·	2.2 km	MPC · JPL
151161	2001 XL_{130}	—	December 14, 2001	Socorro	LINEAR	·	2.1 km	MPC · JPL
151162	2001 XJ_{137}	—	December 14, 2001	Socorro	LINEAR	(5)	2.0 km	MPC · JPL
151163	2001 XU_{137}	—	December 14, 2001	Socorro	LINEAR	·	2.0 km	MPC · JPL
151164	2001 XR_{138}	—	December 14, 2001	Socorro	LINEAR	·	2.7 km	MPC · JPL
151165	2001 XB_{140}	—	December 14, 2001	Socorro	LINEAR	·	2.3 km	MPC · JPL
151166	2001 XD_{148}	—	December 14, 2001	Socorro	LINEAR	·	2.9 km	MPC · JPL
151167	2001 XP_{151}	—	December 14, 2001	Socorro	LINEAR	KOR	2.5 km	MPC · JPL
151168	2001 XC_{154}	—	December 14, 2001	Socorro	LINEAR	·	2.6 km	MPC · JPL
151169	2001 XP_{157}	—	December 14, 2001	Socorro	LINEAR	EUN	2.1 km	MPC · JPL
151170	2001 XR_{164}	—	December 14, 2001	Socorro	LINEAR	·	2.9 km	MPC · JPL
151171	2001 XU_{166}	—	December 14, 2001	Socorro	LINEAR	(7744)	2.1 km	MPC · JPL
151172	2001 XW_{167}	—	December 14, 2001	Socorro	LINEAR	·	2.6 km	MPC · JPL
151173	2001 XS_{171}	—	December 14, 2001	Socorro	LINEAR	·	2.6 km	MPC · JPL
151174	2001 XT_{182}	—	December 14, 2001	Socorro	LINEAR	·	2.8 km	MPC · JPL
151175	2001 XP_{189}	—	December 14, 2001	Socorro	LINEAR	·	2.5 km	MPC · JPL
151176	2001 XM_{194}	—	December 14, 2001	Socorro	LINEAR	·	2.9 km	MPC · JPL
151177	2001 XV_{195}	—	December 14, 2001	Socorro	LINEAR	·	4.6 km	MPC · JPL
151178	2001 XJ_{200}	—	December 15, 2001	Socorro	LINEAR	·	2.1 km	MPC · JPL
151179	2001 XE_{206}	—	December 11, 2001	Socorro	LINEAR	·	2.7 km	MPC · JPL
151180	2001 XY_{207}	—	December 11, 2001	Socorro	LINEAR	·	2.1 km	MPC · JPL
151181	2001 XR_{209}	—	December 11, 2001	Socorro	LINEAR	·	3.3 km	MPC · JPL
151182	2001 XU_{211}	—	December 11, 2001	Socorro	LINEAR	·	3.6 km	MPC · JPL
151183	2001 XZ_{211}	—	December 11, 2001	Socorro	LINEAR	·	3.7 km	MPC · JPL
151184	2001 XW_{212}	—	December 11, 2001	Socorro	LINEAR	·	2.5 km	MPC · JPL
151185	2001 XH_{214}	—	December 11, 2001	Socorro	LINEAR	H	1.0 km	MPC · JPL
151186	2001 XP_{216}	—	December 14, 2001	Socorro	LINEAR	VER	4.5 km	MPC · JPL
151187	2001 XB_{217}	—	December 14, 2001	Socorro	LINEAR	·	3.6 km	MPC · JPL
151188	2001 XK_{217}	—	December 14, 2001	Socorro	LINEAR	·	6.5 km	MPC · JPL
151189	2001 XH_{218}	—	December 15, 2001	Socorro	LINEAR	·	2.8 km	MPC · JPL
151190	2001 XT_{219}	—	December 15, 2001	Socorro	LINEAR	·	2.6 km	MPC · JPL
151191	2001 XD_{220}	—	December 15, 2001	Socorro	LINEAR	·	2.0 km	MPC · JPL
151192	2001 XS_{221}	—	December 15, 2001	Socorro	LINEAR	(29841)	2.0 km	MPC · JPL
151193	2001 XL_{222}	—	December 15, 2001	Socorro	LINEAR	·	3.0 km	MPC · JPL
151194	2001 XG_{230}	—	December 15, 2001	Socorro	LINEAR	·	3.1 km	MPC · JPL
151195	2001 XQ_{231}	—	December 15, 2001	Socorro	LINEAR	·	2.5 km	MPC · JPL
151196	2001 XB_{263}	—	December 14, 2001	Kitt Peak	Spacewatch	·	1.8 km	MPC · JPL
151197	2001 YS	—	December 18, 2001	Kingsnake	J. V. McClusky	·	2.9 km	MPC · JPL
151198	2001 YS_{6}	—	December 17, 2001	Socorro	LINEAR	·	2.7 km	MPC · JPL
151199	2001 YT_{14}	—	December 17, 2001	Socorro	LINEAR	·	1.9 km	MPC · JPL
151200	2001 YP_{15}	—	December 17, 2001	Socorro	LINEAR	MIS	4.4 km	MPC · JPL

== 151201–151300 ==
back to top

Designation			Discovery			Properties		Ref
Permanent	Provisional	Named after	Date	Site	Discoverer(s)	Category	Diam.	Ref
151201	2001 YT_{18}	—	December 17, 2001	Socorro	LINEAR	·	3.7 km	MPC · JPL
151202	2001 YB_{23}	—	December 18, 2001	Socorro	LINEAR	·	2.1 km	MPC · JPL
151203	2001 YV_{26}	—	December 18, 2001	Socorro	LINEAR	·	3.5 km	MPC · JPL
151204	2001 YV_{29}	—	December 18, 2001	Socorro	LINEAR	·	2.8 km	MPC · JPL
151205	2001 YQ_{31}	—	December 18, 2001	Socorro	LINEAR	·	2.2 km	MPC · JPL
151206	2001 YY_{33}	—	December 18, 2001	Socorro	LINEAR	·	2.3 km	MPC · JPL
151207	2001 YS_{36}	—	December 18, 2001	Socorro	LINEAR	MRX	1.4 km	MPC · JPL
151208	2001 YK_{37}	—	December 18, 2001	Socorro	LINEAR	·	2.5 km	MPC · JPL
151209	2001 YP_{41}	—	December 18, 2001	Socorro	LINEAR	·	3.2 km	MPC · JPL
151210	2001 YK_{43}	—	December 18, 2001	Socorro	LINEAR	·	2.7 km	MPC · JPL
151211	2001 YX_{45}	—	December 18, 2001	Socorro	LINEAR	·	4.7 km	MPC · JPL
151212	2001 YD_{52}	—	December 18, 2001	Socorro	LINEAR	·	2.0 km	MPC · JPL
151213	2001 YQ_{52}	—	December 18, 2001	Socorro	LINEAR	EUN	2.1 km	MPC · JPL
151214	2001 YU_{52}	—	December 18, 2001	Socorro	LINEAR	·	3.2 km	MPC · JPL
151215	2001 YA_{53}	—	December 18, 2001	Socorro	LINEAR	·	2.2 km	MPC · JPL
151216	2001 YW_{57}	—	December 18, 2001	Socorro	LINEAR	AGN	2.0 km	MPC · JPL
151217	2001 YH_{61}	—	December 18, 2001	Socorro	LINEAR	·	3.2 km	MPC · JPL
151218	2001 YY_{65}	—	December 18, 2001	Socorro	LINEAR	·	3.4 km	MPC · JPL
151219	2001 YA_{66}	—	December 18, 2001	Socorro	LINEAR	·	3.2 km	MPC · JPL
151220	2001 YU_{68}	—	December 18, 2001	Socorro	LINEAR	·	3.2 km	MPC · JPL
151221	2001 YS_{76}	—	December 18, 2001	Socorro	LINEAR	·	3.3 km	MPC · JPL
151222	2001 YJ_{91}	—	December 17, 2001	Palomar	NEAT	·	3.1 km	MPC · JPL
151223	2001 YB_{96}	—	December 18, 2001	Palomar	NEAT	·	3.2 km	MPC · JPL
151224	2001 YL_{96}	—	December 18, 2001	Palomar	NEAT	·	4.7 km	MPC · JPL
151225	2001 YM_{99}	—	December 17, 2001	Socorro	LINEAR	·	2.4 km	MPC · JPL
151226	2001 YB_{102}	—	December 17, 2001	Socorro	LINEAR	·	2.6 km	MPC · JPL
151227	2001 YR_{103}	—	December 17, 2001	Socorro	LINEAR	·	2.6 km	MPC · JPL
151228	2001 YN_{106}	—	December 17, 2001	Socorro	LINEAR	·	3.4 km	MPC · JPL
151229	2001 YB_{109}	—	December 18, 2001	Socorro	LINEAR	·	3.2 km	MPC · JPL
151230	2001 YG_{114}	—	December 18, 2001	Palomar	NEAT	·	3.1 km	MPC · JPL
151231	2001 YT_{114}	—	December 19, 2001	Palomar	NEAT	·	5.0 km	MPC · JPL
151232	2001 YM_{116}	—	December 18, 2001	Socorro	LINEAR	·	1.7 km	MPC · JPL
151233	2001 YT_{122}	—	December 17, 2001	Socorro	LINEAR	·	3.6 km	MPC · JPL
151234	2001 YX_{122}	—	December 17, 2001	Socorro	LINEAR	·	3.5 km	MPC · JPL
151235	2001 YG_{124}	—	December 17, 2001	Socorro	LINEAR	NEM	4.7 km	MPC · JPL
151236	2001 YS_{128}	—	December 17, 2001	Socorro	LINEAR	·	3.5 km	MPC · JPL
151237	2001 YR_{145}	—	December 17, 2001	Socorro	LINEAR	·	3.2 km	MPC · JPL
151238	2001 YA_{153}	—	December 19, 2001	Anderson Mesa	LONEOS	·	3.6 km	MPC · JPL
151239	2001 YR_{155}	—	December 20, 2001	Palomar	NEAT	·	3.9 km	MPC · JPL
151240	2001 YL_{157}	—	December 19, 2001	Anderson Mesa	LONEOS	·	3.6 km	MPC · JPL
151241	2002 AE	—	January 4, 2002	Kleť	Kleť	AGN	1.9 km	MPC · JPL
151242 Hajós	2002 AH_{11}	Hajós	January 11, 2002	Piszkéstető	K. Sárneczky, Z. Heiner	DOR	3.5 km	MPC · JPL
151243	2002 AC_{20}	—	January 5, 2002	Haleakala	NEAT	AGN	2.2 km	MPC · JPL
151244	2002 AU_{23}	—	January 6, 2002	Palomar	NEAT	·	3.2 km	MPC · JPL
151245	2002 AJ_{24}	—	January 8, 2002	Palomar	NEAT	·	3.3 km	MPC · JPL
151246	2002 AK_{24}	—	January 8, 2002	Palomar	NEAT	EUN	2.4 km	MPC · JPL
151247	2002 AX_{24}	—	January 8, 2002	Palomar	NEAT	·	5.7 km	MPC · JPL
151248	2002 AA_{26}	—	January 8, 2002	Kitt Peak	Spacewatch	·	4.7 km	MPC · JPL
151249	2002 AX_{30}	—	January 9, 2002	Socorro	LINEAR	·	2.7 km	MPC · JPL
151250	2002 AN_{38}	—	January 9, 2002	Socorro	LINEAR	526	4.8 km	MPC · JPL
151251	2002 AE_{41}	—	January 9, 2002	Socorro	LINEAR	AEO	1.6 km	MPC · JPL
151252	2002 AJ_{47}	—	January 9, 2002	Socorro	LINEAR	·	5.0 km	MPC · JPL
151253	2002 AS_{51}	—	January 9, 2002	Socorro	LINEAR	·	3.1 km	MPC · JPL
151254	2002 AG_{55}	—	January 9, 2002	Socorro	LINEAR	HOF	4.0 km	MPC · JPL
151255	2002 AK_{55}	—	January 9, 2002	Socorro	LINEAR	·	3.7 km	MPC · JPL
151256	2002 AT_{57}	—	January 9, 2002	Socorro	LINEAR	WAT	4.6 km	MPC · JPL
151257	2002 AT_{59}	—	January 9, 2002	Socorro	LINEAR	·	4.8 km	MPC · JPL
151258	2002 AT_{65}	—	January 12, 2002	Socorro	LINEAR	·	2.7 km	MPC · JPL
151259	2002 AR_{69}	—	January 8, 2002	Socorro	LINEAR	EUN	2.6 km	MPC · JPL
151260	2002 AR_{79}	—	January 8, 2002	Socorro	LINEAR	·	3.8 km	MPC · JPL
151261	2002 AT_{84}	—	January 9, 2002	Socorro	LINEAR	PAD	2.7 km	MPC · JPL
151262	2002 AO_{88}	—	January 9, 2002	Socorro	LINEAR	·	3.6 km	MPC · JPL
151263	2002 AX_{95}	—	January 8, 2002	Socorro	LINEAR	·	3.1 km	MPC · JPL
151264	2002 AT_{101}	—	January 8, 2002	Socorro	LINEAR	·	2.9 km	MPC · JPL
151265	2002 AO_{114}	—	January 9, 2002	Socorro	LINEAR	·	4.3 km	MPC · JPL
151266	2002 AZ_{119}	—	January 9, 2002	Socorro	LINEAR	·	3.2 km	MPC · JPL
151267	2002 AY_{124}	—	January 11, 2002	Socorro	LINEAR	EUP	8.3 km	MPC · JPL
151268	2002 AJ_{133}	—	January 8, 2002	Socorro	LINEAR	AEO	2.0 km	MPC · JPL
151269	2002 AX_{138}	—	January 9, 2002	Socorro	LINEAR	·	3.1 km	MPC · JPL
151270	2002 AF_{140}	—	January 13, 2002	Socorro	LINEAR	·	2.8 km	MPC · JPL
151271	2002 AO_{146}	—	January 13, 2002	Socorro	LINEAR	·	3.0 km	MPC · JPL
151272	2002 AG_{147}	—	January 14, 2002	Socorro	LINEAR	·	2.8 km	MPC · JPL
151273	2002 AF_{149}	—	January 14, 2002	Socorro	LINEAR	DOR	5.3 km	MPC · JPL
151274	2002 AE_{159}	—	January 13, 2002	Socorro	LINEAR	·	2.5 km	MPC · JPL
151275	2002 AH_{181}	—	January 5, 2002	Palomar	NEAT	·	2.9 km	MPC · JPL
151276	2002 AD_{182}	—	January 5, 2002	Palomar	NEAT	·	6.6 km	MPC · JPL
151277	2002 AM_{182}	—	January 5, 2002	Palomar	NEAT	·	3.4 km	MPC · JPL
151278	2002 AK_{183}	—	January 6, 2002	Anderson Mesa	LONEOS	·	2.4 km	MPC · JPL
151279	2002 AY_{184}	—	January 8, 2002	Palomar	NEAT	·	2.8 km	MPC · JPL
151280 Valeriorizzo	2002 AM_{188}	Valeriorizzo	January 10, 2002	Campo Imperatore	CINEOS	AGN	1.7 km	MPC · JPL
151281	2002 AK_{193}	—	January 12, 2002	Kitt Peak	Spacewatch	·	3.1 km	MPC · JPL
151282	2002 AV_{195}	—	January 13, 2002	Kitt Peak	Spacewatch	KOR	2.0 km	MPC · JPL
151283	2002 AM_{202}	—	January 13, 2002	Socorro	LINEAR	AGN	2.0 km	MPC · JPL
151284	2002 AK_{203}	—	January 7, 2002	Kitt Peak	Spacewatch	·	3.3 km	MPC · JPL
151285	2002 AQ_{208}	—	January 5, 2002	Kitt Peak	Spacewatch	·	2.9 km	MPC · JPL
151286	2002 BJ_{14}	—	January 19, 2002	Socorro	LINEAR	·	3.2 km	MPC · JPL
151287	2002 BQ_{22}	—	January 23, 2002	Socorro	LINEAR	EUN	3.0 km	MPC · JPL
151288	2002 BV_{24}	—	January 23, 2002	Socorro	LINEAR	·	4.0 km	MPC · JPL
151289	2002 BW_{31}	—	January 18, 2002	Palomar	NEAT	·	3.5 km	MPC · JPL
151290	2002 CO_{7}	—	February 6, 2002	Desert Eagle	W. K. Y. Yeung	·	2.9 km	MPC · JPL
151291	2002 CV_{10}	—	February 6, 2002	Socorro	LINEAR	H	810 m	MPC · JPL
151292	2002 CD_{13}	—	February 8, 2002	Fountain Hills	C. W. Juels, P. R. Holvorcem	·	3.1 km	MPC · JPL
151293	2002 CN_{26}	—	February 6, 2002	Socorro	LINEAR	·	4.0 km	MPC · JPL
151294	2002 CV_{27}	—	February 6, 2002	Socorro	LINEAR	GEF	2.2 km	MPC · JPL
151295	2002 CY_{33}	—	February 6, 2002	Socorro	LINEAR	·	6.5 km	MPC · JPL
151296	2002 CQ_{46}	—	February 12, 2002	Cordell-Lorenz	D. T. Durig	·	6.8 km	MPC · JPL
151297	2002 CE_{52}	—	February 12, 2002	Desert Eagle	W. K. Y. Yeung	·	4.8 km	MPC · JPL
151298	2002 CD_{67}	—	February 7, 2002	Socorro	LINEAR	HOF	4.5 km	MPC · JPL
151299	2002 CV_{77}	—	February 7, 2002	Socorro	LINEAR	HOF	4.5 km	MPC · JPL
151300	2002 CL_{81}	—	February 7, 2002	Socorro	LINEAR	KOR	2.4 km	MPC · JPL

== 151301–151400 ==
back to top

Designation			Discovery			Properties		Ref
Permanent	Provisional	Named after	Date	Site	Discoverer(s)	Category	Diam.	Ref
151301	2002 CW_{82}	—	February 7, 2002	Socorro	LINEAR	·	6.9 km	MPC · JPL
151302	2002 CZ_{83}	—	February 7, 2002	Socorro	LINEAR	EOS	3.3 km	MPC · JPL
151303	2002 CT_{84}	—	February 7, 2002	Socorro	LINEAR	·	3.4 km	MPC · JPL
151304	2002 CJ_{85}	—	February 7, 2002	Socorro	LINEAR	·	5.3 km	MPC · JPL
151305	2002 CW_{90}	—	February 7, 2002	Socorro	LINEAR	KOR	2.2 km	MPC · JPL
151306	2002 CZ_{90}	—	February 7, 2002	Socorro	LINEAR	EOS	3.1 km	MPC · JPL
151307	2002 CJ_{92}	—	February 7, 2002	Socorro	LINEAR	·	4.0 km	MPC · JPL
151308	2002 CO_{95}	—	February 7, 2002	Socorro	LINEAR	·	3.1 km	MPC · JPL
151309	2002 CD_{97}	—	February 7, 2002	Socorro	LINEAR	EOS	2.9 km	MPC · JPL
151310	2002 CO_{98}	—	February 7, 2002	Socorro	LINEAR	·	3.4 km	MPC · JPL
151311	2002 CA_{105}	—	February 7, 2002	Socorro	LINEAR	EOS	2.9 km	MPC · JPL
151312	2002 CY_{105}	—	February 7, 2002	Socorro	LINEAR	·	3.3 km	MPC · JPL
151313	2002 CN_{107}	—	February 7, 2002	Socorro	LINEAR	·	4.2 km	MPC · JPL
151314	2002 CF_{108}	—	February 7, 2002	Socorro	LINEAR	·	5.6 km	MPC · JPL
151315	2002 CQ_{115}	—	February 8, 2002	Needville	Needville	·	4.7 km	MPC · JPL
151316	2002 CE_{118}	—	February 14, 2002	Desert Eagle	W. K. Y. Yeung	EOS	3.4 km	MPC · JPL
151317	2002 CH_{121}	—	February 7, 2002	Socorro	LINEAR	KOR	2.2 km	MPC · JPL
151318	2002 CH_{123}	—	February 7, 2002	Socorro	LINEAR	·	3.8 km	MPC · JPL
151319	2002 CT_{125}	—	February 7, 2002	Socorro	LINEAR	EOS	3.4 km	MPC · JPL
151320	2002 CQ_{131}	—	February 7, 2002	Socorro	LINEAR	·	3.1 km	MPC · JPL
151321	2002 CY_{133}	—	February 7, 2002	Socorro	LINEAR	·	4.4 km	MPC · JPL
151322	2002 CO_{136}	—	February 8, 2002	Socorro	LINEAR	·	5.4 km	MPC · JPL
151323	2002 CF_{138}	—	February 8, 2002	Socorro	LINEAR	·	4.0 km	MPC · JPL
151324	2002 CG_{147}	—	February 9, 2002	Socorro	LINEAR	·	5.4 km	MPC · JPL
151325	2002 CN_{147}	—	February 10, 2002	Socorro	LINEAR	AST	2.7 km	MPC · JPL
151326	2002 CO_{149}	—	February 10, 2002	Socorro	LINEAR	EOS	2.6 km	MPC · JPL
151327	2002 CG_{151}	—	February 10, 2002	Socorro	LINEAR	ADE	5.3 km	MPC · JPL
151328	2002 CF_{163}	—	February 8, 2002	Socorro	LINEAR	·	3.2 km	MPC · JPL
151329	2002 CO_{176}	—	February 10, 2002	Socorro	LINEAR	HYG	4.4 km	MPC · JPL
151330	2002 CD_{178}	—	February 10, 2002	Socorro	LINEAR	·	3.7 km	MPC · JPL
151331	2002 CH_{198}	—	February 10, 2002	Socorro	LINEAR	KOR	2.1 km	MPC · JPL
151332	2002 CK_{202}	—	February 10, 2002	Socorro	LINEAR	KOR	2.1 km	MPC · JPL
151333	2002 CF_{203}	—	February 10, 2002	Socorro	LINEAR	·	3.3 km	MPC · JPL
151334	2002 CY_{213}	—	February 10, 2002	Socorro	LINEAR	·	2.6 km	MPC · JPL
151335	2002 CH_{216}	—	February 10, 2002	Socorro	LINEAR	KOR	2.7 km	MPC · JPL
151336	2002 CE_{217}	—	February 10, 2002	Socorro	LINEAR	·	3.4 km	MPC · JPL
151337	2002 CM_{217}	—	February 10, 2002	Socorro	LINEAR	KOR	2.6 km	MPC · JPL
151338	2002 CM_{224}	—	February 11, 2002	Socorro	LINEAR	KOR	2.3 km	MPC · JPL
151339	2002 CT_{224}	—	February 11, 2002	Socorro	LINEAR	·	5.6 km	MPC · JPL
151340	2002 CE_{227}	—	February 6, 2002	Palomar	NEAT	NAE	5.1 km	MPC · JPL
151341	2002 CK_{236}	—	February 12, 2002	Kitt Peak	Spacewatch	KOR	2.0 km	MPC · JPL
151342	2002 CV_{236}	—	February 8, 2002	Socorro	LINEAR	·	6.9 km	MPC · JPL
151343	2002 CM_{241}	—	February 11, 2002	Socorro	LINEAR	·	4.2 km	MPC · JPL
151344	2002 CE_{246}	—	February 13, 2002	Kitt Peak	Spacewatch	·	5.5 km	MPC · JPL
151345	2002 CD_{247}	—	February 15, 2002	Socorro	LINEAR	·	3.0 km	MPC · JPL
151346	2002 CK_{259}	—	February 6, 2002	Socorro	LINEAR	T_{j} (2.98)	6.6 km	MPC · JPL
151347	2002 CP_{265}	—	February 6, 2002	Kitt Peak	Spacewatch	·	2.4 km	MPC · JPL
151348	2002 CJ_{270}	—	February 7, 2002	Kitt Peak	Spacewatch	·	2.3 km	MPC · JPL
151349 Stanleycooper	2002 CW_{270}	Stanleycooper	February 8, 2002	Kitt Peak	M. W. Buie	·	2.5 km	MPC · JPL
151350	2002 CZ_{279}	—	February 7, 2002	Kitt Peak	Spacewatch	·	3.1 km	MPC · JPL
151351 Dalleore	2002 CS_{282}	Dalleore	February 8, 2002	Kitt Peak	M. W. Buie	·	2.6 km	MPC · JPL
151352	2002 CK_{286}	—	February 10, 2002	Socorro	LINEAR	·	2.8 km	MPC · JPL
151353	2002 CW_{291}	—	February 11, 2002	Socorro	LINEAR	·	3.7 km	MPC · JPL
151354	2002 CW_{294}	—	February 10, 2002	Socorro	LINEAR	EOS	3.1 km	MPC · JPL
151355	2002 CH_{295}	—	February 10, 2002	Socorro	LINEAR	·	2.7 km	MPC · JPL
151356	2002 CQ_{296}	—	February 10, 2002	Socorro	LINEAR	·	3.3 km	MPC · JPL
151357	2002 CN_{304}	—	February 15, 2002	Socorro	LINEAR	EOS	3.5 km	MPC · JPL
151358	2002 CY_{309}	—	February 6, 2002	Palomar	NEAT	EOS	2.8 km	MPC · JPL
151359	2002 CG_{311}	—	February 10, 2002	Socorro	LINEAR	·	3.0 km	MPC · JPL
151360	2002 CA_{312}	—	February 15, 2002	Socorro	LINEAR	·	4.6 km	MPC · JPL
151361	2002 CB_{312}	—	February 12, 2002	Socorro	LINEAR	·	3.4 km	MPC · JPL
151362 Chenkegong	2002 CP_{313}	Chenkegong	February 11, 2002	Nanchuan	Q. Ye	·	3.1 km	MPC · JPL
151363	2002 CO_{314}	—	February 10, 2002	Socorro	LINEAR	·	3.7 km	MPC · JPL
151364	2002 DN_{3}	—	February 21, 2002	Socorro	LINEAR	·	980 m	MPC · JPL
151365	2002 DR_{6}	—	February 20, 2002	Kitt Peak	Spacewatch	·	2.7 km	MPC · JPL
151366	2002 DK_{15}	—	February 16, 2002	Palomar	NEAT	·	7.2 km	MPC · JPL
151367	2002 DM_{16}	—	February 20, 2002	Socorro	LINEAR	·	6.6 km	MPC · JPL
151368	2002 ET_{3}	—	March 10, 2002	Cima Ekar	ADAS	·	3.1 km	MPC · JPL
151369	2002 EB_{4}	—	March 10, 2002	Cima Ekar	ADAS	THM	4.8 km	MPC · JPL
151370	2002 EF_{5}	—	March 10, 2002	Cima Ekar	ADAS	·	3.0 km	MPC · JPL
151371	2002 EK_{14}	—	March 5, 2002	Haleakala	NEAT	·	7.2 km	MPC · JPL
151372	2002 EM_{15}	—	March 5, 2002	Palomar	NEAT	·	3.7 km	MPC · JPL
151373	2002 EW_{16}	—	March 6, 2002	Socorro	LINEAR	·	3.2 km	MPC · JPL
151374	2002 EX_{19}	—	March 9, 2002	Socorro	LINEAR	·	6.2 km	MPC · JPL
151375	2002 EK_{22}	—	March 10, 2002	Haleakala	NEAT	·	3.7 km	MPC · JPL
151376	2002 EP_{26}	—	March 10, 2002	Anderson Mesa	LONEOS	·	5.5 km	MPC · JPL
151377	2002 EY_{27}	—	March 9, 2002	Socorro	LINEAR	·	3.7 km	MPC · JPL
151378	2002 EH_{43}	—	March 12, 2002	Socorro	LINEAR	·	4.9 km	MPC · JPL
151379	2002 ED_{45}	—	March 10, 2002	Haleakala	NEAT	·	5.0 km	MPC · JPL
151380	2002 EF_{47}	—	March 12, 2002	Palomar	NEAT	EOS	3.8 km	MPC · JPL
151381	2002 EY_{49}	—	March 12, 2002	Palomar	NEAT	EOS	2.9 km	MPC · JPL
151382	2002 EY_{50}	—	March 12, 2002	Palomar	NEAT	LIX	6.0 km	MPC · JPL
151383	2002 EZ_{58}	—	March 13, 2002	Socorro	LINEAR	·	3.0 km	MPC · JPL
151384	2002 EU_{59}	—	March 13, 2002	Socorro	LINEAR	KOR	2.3 km	MPC · JPL
151385	2002 EH_{62}	—	March 13, 2002	Socorro	LINEAR	·	3.7 km	MPC · JPL
151386	2002 EL_{63}	—	March 13, 2002	Socorro	LINEAR	EOS	3.5 km	MPC · JPL
151387	2002 EF_{68}	—	March 13, 2002	Socorro	LINEAR	·	3.6 km	MPC · JPL
151388	2002 EY_{69}	—	March 13, 2002	Socorro	LINEAR	·	5.3 km	MPC · JPL
151389	2002 EZ_{69}	—	March 13, 2002	Socorro	LINEAR	·	3.1 km	MPC · JPL
151390	2002 ED_{71}	—	March 13, 2002	Socorro	LINEAR	HYG	4.5 km	MPC · JPL
151391	2002 EM_{72}	—	March 13, 2002	Socorro	LINEAR	·	6.0 km	MPC · JPL
151392	2002 EJ_{78}	—	March 11, 2002	Kitt Peak	Spacewatch	·	4.1 km	MPC · JPL
151393	2002 ET_{79}	—	March 11, 2002	Haleakala	NEAT	(1298)	4.7 km	MPC · JPL
151394	2002 EX_{79}	—	March 12, 2002	Palomar	NEAT	·	2.5 km	MPC · JPL
151395	2002 ET_{83}	—	March 9, 2002	Socorro	LINEAR	·	4.5 km	MPC · JPL
151396	2002 EM_{86}	—	March 9, 2002	Socorro	LINEAR	·	7.0 km	MPC · JPL
151397	2002 EF_{89}	—	March 11, 2002	Socorro	LINEAR	EOS	3.4 km	MPC · JPL
151398	2002 EH_{89}	—	March 11, 2002	Socorro	LINEAR	·	6.1 km	MPC · JPL
151399	2002 EU_{90}	—	March 12, 2002	Socorro	LINEAR	HYG	4.2 km	MPC · JPL
151400	2002 EW_{99}	—	March 5, 2002	Anderson Mesa	LONEOS	·	6.0 km	MPC · JPL

== 151401–151500 ==
back to top

Designation			Discovery			Properties		Ref
Permanent	Provisional	Named after	Date	Site	Discoverer(s)	Category	Diam.	Ref
151401	2002 EC_{101}	—	March 6, 2002	Socorro	LINEAR	·	4.6 km	MPC · JPL
151402	2002 EW_{105}	—	March 9, 2002	Anderson Mesa	LONEOS	·	5.3 km	MPC · JPL
151403	2002 EV_{106}	—	March 9, 2002	Anderson Mesa	LONEOS	EMA	6.0 km	MPC · JPL
151404	2002 ER_{107}	—	March 10, 2002	Kitt Peak	Spacewatch	EUP	6.2 km	MPC · JPL
151405	2002 EQ_{111}	—	March 9, 2002	Catalina	CSS	·	4.9 km	MPC · JPL
151406	2002 EO_{115}	—	March 10, 2002	Anderson Mesa	LONEOS	·	3.6 km	MPC · JPL
151407	2002 EF_{116}	—	March 11, 2002	Palomar	NEAT	KOR	2.1 km	MPC · JPL
151408	2002 EN_{121}	—	March 11, 2002	Kitt Peak	Spacewatch	·	6.1 km	MPC · JPL
151409	2002 EX_{125}	—	March 12, 2002	Palomar	NEAT	·	5.6 km	MPC · JPL
151410	2002 EC_{126}	—	March 12, 2002	Palomar	NEAT	·	5.3 km	MPC · JPL
151411	2002 EN_{131}	—	March 13, 2002	Palomar	NEAT	·	3.4 km	MPC · JPL
151412	2002 EB_{137}	—	March 12, 2002	Palomar	NEAT	EOS	3.1 km	MPC · JPL
151413	2002 EN_{137}	—	March 12, 2002	Palomar	NEAT	·	3.0 km	MPC · JPL
151414	2002 EL_{139}	—	March 12, 2002	Kitt Peak	Spacewatch	·	4.3 km	MPC · JPL
151415	2002 ES_{140}	—	March 12, 2002	Palomar	NEAT	EOS	3.0 km	MPC · JPL
151416	2002 ED_{145}	—	March 13, 2002	Socorro	LINEAR	·	4.8 km	MPC · JPL
151417	2002 EA_{146}	—	March 13, 2002	Cima Ekar	ADAS	KOR	2.2 km	MPC · JPL
151418	2002 ES_{146}	—	March 14, 2002	Anderson Mesa	LONEOS	·	4.0 km	MPC · JPL
151419	2002 EA_{150}	—	March 15, 2002	Palomar	NEAT	·	3.6 km	MPC · JPL
151420	2002 EK_{151}	—	March 15, 2002	Kitt Peak	Spacewatch	·	4.1 km	MPC · JPL
151421	2002 EW_{151}	—	March 15, 2002	Kitt Peak	Spacewatch	·	5.1 km	MPC · JPL
151422	2002 FH	—	March 16, 2002	Desert Eagle	W. K. Y. Yeung	·	6.5 km	MPC · JPL
151423	2002 FS_{1}	—	March 19, 2002	Fountain Hills	Hills, Fountain	·	5.1 km	MPC · JPL
151424	2002 FT_{1}	—	March 19, 2002	Fountain Hills	Hills, Fountain	(8737)	6.4 km	MPC · JPL
151425	2002 FT_{2}	—	March 19, 2002	Desert Eagle	W. K. Y. Yeung	VER	6.1 km	MPC · JPL
151426	2002 FV_{2}	—	March 19, 2002	Desert Eagle	W. K. Y. Yeung	·	5.0 km	MPC · JPL
151427	2002 FF_{3}	—	March 16, 2002	Socorro	LINEAR	H	1.1 km	MPC · JPL
151428	2002 FO_{10}	—	March 17, 2002	Socorro	LINEAR	·	3.3 km	MPC · JPL
151429	2002 FT_{13}	—	March 16, 2002	Haleakala	NEAT	·	5.4 km	MPC · JPL
151430 Nemunas	2002 FC_{14}	Nemunas	March 16, 2002	Moletai	K. Černis, Zdanavicius, J.	·	3.3 km	MPC · JPL
151431	2002 FH_{14}	—	March 16, 2002	Socorro	LINEAR	·	2.7 km	MPC · JPL
151432	2002 FN_{27}	—	March 20, 2002	Socorro	LINEAR	EOS	3.6 km	MPC · JPL
151433	2002 FS_{28}	—	March 20, 2002	Socorro	LINEAR	·	3.5 km	MPC · JPL
151434	2002 FK_{38}	—	March 30, 2002	Palomar	NEAT	HYG	4.9 km	MPC · JPL
151435	2002 FN_{39}	—	March 16, 2002	Socorro	LINEAR	·	2.3 km	MPC · JPL
151436	2002 GK_{2}	—	April 6, 2002	Kleť	Kleť	·	5.0 km	MPC · JPL
151437	2002 GB_{7}	—	April 12, 2002	Desert Eagle	W. K. Y. Yeung	·	6.8 km	MPC · JPL
151438	2002 GL_{7}	—	April 14, 2002	Desert Eagle	W. K. Y. Yeung	·	4.1 km	MPC · JPL
151439	2002 GY_{8}	—	April 14, 2002	Palomar	NEAT	·	4.1 km	MPC · JPL
151440	2002 GY_{14}	—	April 15, 2002	Socorro	LINEAR	·	3.2 km	MPC · JPL
151441	2002 GT_{16}	—	April 15, 2002	Socorro	LINEAR	THM	4.1 km	MPC · JPL
151442	2002 GJ_{26}	—	April 14, 2002	Socorro	LINEAR	·	6.8 km	MPC · JPL
151443	2002 GH_{34}	—	April 1, 2002	Palomar	NEAT	·	4.6 km	MPC · JPL
151444	2002 GR_{45}	—	April 4, 2002	Palomar	NEAT	·	5.1 km	MPC · JPL
151445	2002 GW_{49}	—	April 5, 2002	Palomar	NEAT	·	6.5 km	MPC · JPL
151446	2002 GU_{53}	—	April 5, 2002	Anderson Mesa	LONEOS	·	3.2 km	MPC · JPL
151447	2002 GZ_{54}	—	April 5, 2002	Anderson Mesa	LONEOS	·	3.8 km	MPC · JPL
151448	2002 GS_{77}	—	April 9, 2002	Socorro	LINEAR	·	7.3 km	MPC · JPL
151449	2002 GY_{77}	—	April 9, 2002	Socorro	LINEAR	·	4.7 km	MPC · JPL
151450	2002 GC_{86}	—	April 10, 2002	Socorro	LINEAR	·	7.2 km	MPC · JPL
151451	2002 GB_{101}	—	April 10, 2002	Socorro	LINEAR	·	3.1 km	MPC · JPL
151452	2002 GX_{101}	—	April 10, 2002	Socorro	LINEAR	·	6.2 km	MPC · JPL
151453	2002 GT_{102}	—	April 10, 2002	Socorro	LINEAR	·	2.1 km	MPC · JPL
151454	2002 GP_{104}	—	April 10, 2002	Socorro	LINEAR	·	6.1 km	MPC · JPL
151455	2002 GL_{105}	—	April 11, 2002	Anderson Mesa	LONEOS	·	3.8 km	MPC · JPL
151456	2002 GH_{106}	—	April 11, 2002	Anderson Mesa	LONEOS	·	4.1 km	MPC · JPL
151457	2002 GX_{106}	—	April 11, 2002	Anderson Mesa	LONEOS	EOS	3.6 km	MPC · JPL
151458	2002 GV_{108}	—	April 11, 2002	Palomar	NEAT	ELF	5.5 km	MPC · JPL
151459	2002 GS_{109}	—	April 11, 2002	Palomar	NEAT	·	6.6 km	MPC · JPL
151460	2002 GZ_{110}	—	April 10, 2002	Socorro	LINEAR	·	5.7 km	MPC · JPL
151461	2002 GB_{113}	—	April 11, 2002	Anderson Mesa	LONEOS	·	6.1 km	MPC · JPL
151462	2002 GJ_{119}	—	April 12, 2002	Palomar	NEAT	·	3.9 km	MPC · JPL
151463	2002 GS_{121}	—	April 10, 2002	Socorro	LINEAR	·	5.6 km	MPC · JPL
151464	2002 GE_{128}	—	April 12, 2002	Socorro	LINEAR	·	4.0 km	MPC · JPL
151465	2002 GX_{140}	—	April 13, 2002	Kitt Peak	Spacewatch	·	3.7 km	MPC · JPL
151466	2002 GL_{150}	—	April 14, 2002	Socorro	LINEAR	·	3.7 km	MPC · JPL
151467	2002 GK_{153}	—	April 12, 2002	Palomar	NEAT	·	4.5 km	MPC · JPL
151468	2002 GT_{154}	—	April 13, 2002	Palomar	NEAT	·	3.1 km	MPC · JPL
151469	2002 GX_{154}	—	April 13, 2002	Palomar	NEAT	·	3.2 km	MPC · JPL
151470	2002 GL_{160}	—	April 15, 2002	Palomar	NEAT	EUP	5.8 km	MPC · JPL
151471	2002 GD_{161}	—	April 15, 2002	Anderson Mesa	LONEOS	·	7.7 km	MPC · JPL
151472	2002 GJ_{167}	—	April 9, 2002	Socorro	LINEAR	HYG	4.9 km	MPC · JPL
151473	2002 GP_{168}	—	April 9, 2002	Socorro	LINEAR	·	3.9 km	MPC · JPL
151474	2002 HZ_{2}	—	April 16, 2002	Socorro	LINEAR	·	7.3 km	MPC · JPL
151475	2002 HF_{11}	—	April 21, 2002	Palomar	NEAT	·	5.9 km	MPC · JPL
151476	2002 HE_{13}	—	April 22, 2002	Socorro	LINEAR	H	1.1 km	MPC · JPL
151477	2002 HG_{16}	—	April 18, 2002	Kitt Peak	Spacewatch	THM	4.4 km	MPC · JPL
151478	2002 JR	—	May 3, 2002	Desert Eagle	W. K. Y. Yeung	·	5.6 km	MPC · JPL
151479	2002 JL_{4}	—	May 5, 2002	Socorro	LINEAR	EUP	10 km	MPC · JPL
151480	2002 JR_{4}	—	May 5, 2002	Socorro	LINEAR	H	1.1 km	MPC · JPL
151481	2002 JV_{9}	—	May 6, 2002	Socorro	LINEAR	·	7.5 km	MPC · JPL
151482	2002 JM_{10}	—	May 6, 2002	Socorro	LINEAR	TIR	4.9 km	MPC · JPL
151483	2002 JH_{16}	—	May 7, 2002	Socorro	LINEAR	H	870 m	MPC · JPL
151484	2002 JP_{16}	—	May 6, 2002	Palomar	NEAT	EOS	3.6 km	MPC · JPL
151485	2002 JX_{17}	—	May 7, 2002	Palomar	NEAT	HYG	5.4 km	MPC · JPL
151486	2002 JM_{22}	—	May 8, 2002	Socorro	LINEAR	·	5.9 km	MPC · JPL
151487	2002 JU_{22}	—	May 8, 2002	Socorro	LINEAR	THM	4.2 km	MPC · JPL
151488	2002 JG_{23}	—	May 8, 2002	Socorro	LINEAR	·	5.5 km	MPC · JPL
151489	2002 JE_{30}	—	May 9, 2002	Socorro	LINEAR	HYG	5.6 km	MPC · JPL
151490	2002 JL_{45}	—	May 9, 2002	Socorro	LINEAR	·	4.3 km	MPC · JPL
151491	2002 JU_{46}	—	May 9, 2002	Socorro	LINEAR	·	6.8 km	MPC · JPL
151492	2002 JS_{58}	—	May 9, 2002	Socorro	LINEAR	·	5.6 km	MPC · JPL
151493	2002 JE_{68}	—	May 9, 2002	Socorro	LINEAR	H	890 m	MPC · JPL
151494	2002 JU_{68}	—	May 6, 2002	Socorro	LINEAR	INA	5.7 km	MPC · JPL
151495	2002 JM_{69}	—	May 7, 2002	Socorro	LINEAR	·	9.0 km	MPC · JPL
151496	2002 JC_{72}	—	May 8, 2002	Socorro	LINEAR	LIX	6.9 km	MPC · JPL
151497	2002 JD_{78}	—	May 11, 2002	Socorro	LINEAR	·	6.2 km	MPC · JPL
151498	2002 JM_{78}	—	May 11, 2002	Socorro	LINEAR	HYG	4.6 km	MPC · JPL
151499	2002 JL_{97}	—	May 6, 2002	Kvistaberg	Uppsala-DLR Asteroid Survey	·	7.5 km	MPC · JPL
151500	2002 JE_{108}	—	May 14, 2002	Palomar	NEAT	EUP	7.9 km	MPC · JPL

== 151501–151600 ==
back to top

Designation			Discovery			Properties		Ref
Permanent	Provisional	Named after	Date	Site	Discoverer(s)	Category	Diam.	Ref
151501	2002 JW_{119}	—	May 5, 2002	Palomar	NEAT	·	6.4 km	MPC · JPL
151502	2002 JK_{123}	—	May 6, 2002	Palomar	NEAT	·	5.2 km	MPC · JPL
151503	2002 JA_{125}	—	May 7, 2002	Palomar	NEAT	HYG	4.3 km	MPC · JPL
151504	2002 KQ_{9}	—	May 30, 2002	Palomar	NEAT	LUT	7.3 km	MPC · JPL
151505	2002 LG_{37}	—	June 10, 2002	Socorro	LINEAR	·	1.7 km	MPC · JPL
151506	2002 LV_{57}	—	June 11, 2002	Anderson Mesa	LONEOS	·	1.9 km	MPC · JPL
151507	2002 MK_{1}	—	June 18, 2002	Socorro	LINEAR	H	1.1 km	MPC · JPL
151508	2002 NW_{33}	—	July 13, 2002	Haleakala	NEAT	·	3.2 km	MPC · JPL
151509	2002 NK_{48}	—	July 14, 2002	Palomar	NEAT	NYS	1.3 km	MPC · JPL
151510	2002 NW_{59}	—	July 15, 2002	Palomar	NEAT	·	850 m	MPC · JPL
151511	2002 PL_{22}	—	August 6, 2002	Palomar	NEAT	V	860 m	MPC · JPL
151512	2002 PW_{31}	—	August 6, 2002	Palomar	NEAT	·	1.1 km	MPC · JPL
151513	2002 PW_{44}	—	August 5, 2002	Socorro	LINEAR	·	1.5 km	MPC · JPL
151514	2002 PG_{52}	—	August 8, 2002	Palomar	NEAT	·	1.4 km	MPC · JPL
151515	2002 PD_{61}	—	August 11, 2002	Socorro	LINEAR	H	990 m	MPC · JPL
151516	2002 PN_{78}	—	August 11, 2002	Palomar	NEAT	NYS	2.0 km	MPC · JPL
151517	2002 PQ_{113}	—	August 15, 2002	Socorro	LINEAR	·	3.2 km	MPC · JPL
151518	2002 PE_{133}	—	August 14, 2002	Socorro	LINEAR	·	1.4 km	MPC · JPL
151519	2002 QG_{36}	—	August 30, 2002	Ametlla de Mar	Ametlla de Mar	(2076)	1.8 km	MPC · JPL
151520	2002 RL_{1}	—	September 1, 2002	Haleakala	NEAT	(883)	1.1 km	MPC · JPL
151521	2002 RB_{2}	—	September 4, 2002	Anderson Mesa	LONEOS	·	1.1 km	MPC · JPL
151522	2002 RM_{17}	—	September 4, 2002	Anderson Mesa	LONEOS	·	1.1 km	MPC · JPL
151523	2002 RG_{28}	—	September 5, 2002	Anderson Mesa	LONEOS	·	2.3 km	MPC · JPL
151524	2002 RZ_{45}	—	September 5, 2002	Socorro	LINEAR	·	1.6 km	MPC · JPL
151525	2002 RA_{50}	—	September 5, 2002	Socorro	LINEAR	·	1.1 km	MPC · JPL
151526	2002 RU_{62}	—	September 5, 2002	Socorro	LINEAR	·	1.1 km	MPC · JPL
151527	2002 RN_{67}	—	September 3, 2002	Palomar	NEAT	·	1.9 km	MPC · JPL
151528	2002 RZ_{68}	—	September 4, 2002	Anderson Mesa	LONEOS	·	1.5 km	MPC · JPL
151529	2002 RR_{80}	—	September 5, 2002	Socorro	LINEAR	·	1.3 km	MPC · JPL
151530	2002 RO_{93}	—	September 5, 2002	Anderson Mesa	LONEOS	·	1.2 km	MPC · JPL
151531	2002 RU_{99}	—	September 5, 2002	Socorro	LINEAR	(2076)	1.4 km	MPC · JPL
151532	2002 RN_{101}	—	September 5, 2002	Socorro	LINEAR	·	1.5 km	MPC · JPL
151533	2002 RB_{103}	—	September 5, 2002	Socorro	LINEAR	MAS	980 m	MPC · JPL
151534	2002 RM_{104}	—	September 5, 2002	Socorro	LINEAR	·	1.2 km	MPC · JPL
151535	2002 RS_{110}	—	September 6, 2002	Socorro	LINEAR	·	1.0 km	MPC · JPL
151536	2002 RR_{122}	—	September 8, 2002	Haleakala	NEAT	·	1.9 km	MPC · JPL
151537	2002 RD_{132}	—	September 11, 2002	Haleakala	NEAT	·	1.7 km	MPC · JPL
151538	2002 RH_{139}	—	September 10, 2002	Haleakala	NEAT	·	1.5 km	MPC · JPL
151539	2002 RB_{180}	—	September 14, 2002	Kitt Peak	Spacewatch	·	900 m	MPC · JPL
151540	2002 SR_{14}	—	September 27, 2002	Palomar	NEAT	·	1.7 km	MPC · JPL
151541	2002 SE_{19}	—	September 27, 2002	Palomar	NEAT	·	2.4 km	MPC · JPL
151542	2002 SH_{25}	—	September 28, 2002	Haleakala	NEAT	PHO	2.1 km	MPC · JPL
151543	2002 SF_{35}	—	September 29, 2002	Kitt Peak	Spacewatch	·	1.0 km	MPC · JPL
151544	2002 SE_{47}	—	September 30, 2002	Socorro	LINEAR	NYS	1.7 km	MPC · JPL
151545	2002 SH_{47}	—	September 30, 2002	Socorro	LINEAR	·	1.1 km	MPC · JPL
151546	2002 SE_{49}	—	September 30, 2002	Socorro	LINEAR	(2076)	1.4 km	MPC · JPL
151547	2002 SF_{54}	—	September 30, 2002	Socorro	LINEAR	·	1.2 km	MPC · JPL
151548	2002 SE_{58}	—	September 30, 2002	Haleakala	NEAT	·	1.1 km	MPC · JPL
151549	2002 TA_{5}	—	October 1, 2002	Socorro	LINEAR	·	1.2 km	MPC · JPL
151550	2002 TV_{8}	—	October 1, 2002	Anderson Mesa	LONEOS	·	1.8 km	MPC · JPL
151551	2002 TR_{24}	—	October 2, 2002	Socorro	LINEAR	·	1.8 km	MPC · JPL
151552	2002 TU_{27}	—	October 2, 2002	Socorro	LINEAR	·	810 m	MPC · JPL
151553	2002 TW_{27}	—	October 2, 2002	Socorro	LINEAR	·	1.1 km	MPC · JPL
151554	2002 TF_{31}	—	October 2, 2002	Socorro	LINEAR	·	930 m	MPC · JPL
151555	2002 TJ_{43}	—	October 2, 2002	Socorro	LINEAR	·	2.0 km	MPC · JPL
151556	2002 TO_{52}	—	October 2, 2002	Socorro	LINEAR	·	2.2 km	MPC · JPL
151557	2002 TM_{74}	—	October 1, 2002	Črni Vrh	J. Skvarč, B. Dintinjana	(2076)	2.1 km	MPC · JPL
151558	2002 TB_{75}	—	October 1, 2002	Anderson Mesa	LONEOS	·	1.9 km	MPC · JPL
151559	2002 TP_{77}	—	October 1, 2002	Anderson Mesa	LONEOS	NYS	2.0 km	MPC · JPL
151560	2002 TW_{82}	—	October 2, 2002	Socorro	LINEAR	·	940 m	MPC · JPL
151561	2002 TE_{88}	—	October 3, 2002	Socorro	LINEAR	·	1.3 km	MPC · JPL
151562	2002 TW_{100}	—	October 4, 2002	Socorro	LINEAR	·	1.1 km	MPC · JPL
151563	2002 TM_{135}	—	October 4, 2002	Socorro	LINEAR	·	1.2 km	MPC · JPL
151564	2002 TZ_{144}	—	October 2, 2002	Haleakala	NEAT	·	2.3 km	MPC · JPL
151565	2002 TH_{168}	—	October 3, 2002	Socorro	LINEAR	·	1.3 km	MPC · JPL
151566	2002 TJ_{169}	—	October 3, 2002	Palomar	NEAT	·	2.0 km	MPC · JPL
151567	2002 TW_{184}	—	October 4, 2002	Socorro	LINEAR	·	1.0 km	MPC · JPL
151568	2002 TP_{189}	—	October 5, 2002	Socorro	LINEAR	V	1.2 km	MPC · JPL
151569	2002 TU_{205}	—	October 4, 2002	Socorro	LINEAR	·	1.3 km	MPC · JPL
151570	2002 TO_{215}	—	October 4, 2002	Socorro	LINEAR	·	1.4 km	MPC · JPL
151571	2002 TC_{223}	—	October 7, 2002	Socorro	LINEAR	·	1.0 km	MPC · JPL
151572	2002 TX_{223}	—	October 7, 2002	Socorro	LINEAR	·	2.0 km	MPC · JPL
151573	2002 TM_{225}	—	October 8, 2002	Anderson Mesa	LONEOS	·	2.5 km	MPC · JPL
151574	2002 TD_{226}	—	October 8, 2002	Anderson Mesa	LONEOS	·	1.4 km	MPC · JPL
151575	2002 TD_{239}	—	October 8, 2002	Anderson Mesa	LONEOS	·	1.6 km	MPC · JPL
151576	2002 TJ_{242}	—	October 9, 2002	Anderson Mesa	LONEOS	·	1.5 km	MPC · JPL
151577	2002 TX_{246}	—	October 9, 2002	Kitt Peak	Spacewatch	·	1.8 km	MPC · JPL
151578	2002 TQ_{249}	—	October 7, 2002	Socorro	LINEAR	·	1.2 km	MPC · JPL
151579	2002 TQ_{255}	—	October 9, 2002	Socorro	LINEAR	·	970 m	MPC · JPL
151580	2002 TJ_{257}	—	October 9, 2002	Socorro	LINEAR	·	1.7 km	MPC · JPL
151581	2002 TG_{264}	—	October 10, 2002	Socorro	LINEAR	·	1.4 km	MPC · JPL
151582	2002 TD_{273}	—	October 9, 2002	Socorro	LINEAR	·	980 m	MPC · JPL
151583	2002 TL_{280}	—	October 10, 2002	Socorro	LINEAR	·	2.8 km	MPC · JPL
151584	2002 TS_{297}	—	October 11, 2002	Socorro	LINEAR	·	1.4 km	MPC · JPL
151585	2002 UO_{9}	—	October 28, 2002	Kitt Peak	Spacewatch	·	1.1 km	MPC · JPL
151586	2002 UK_{15}	—	October 30, 2002	Palomar	NEAT	·	2.0 km	MPC · JPL
151587	2002 UT_{19}	—	October 30, 2002	Haleakala	NEAT	V	870 m	MPC · JPL
151588	2002 UG_{23}	—	October 29, 2002	Fountain Hills	Hills, Fountain	·	1.3 km	MPC · JPL
151589	2002 UK_{40}	—	October 31, 2002	Socorro	LINEAR	fast	2.6 km	MPC · JPL
151590 Fan	2002 UR_{58}	Fan	October 29, 2002	Apache Point	SDSS	V	1.2 km	MPC · JPL
151591	2002 VW_{7}	—	November 1, 2002	Palomar	NEAT	V	950 m	MPC · JPL
151592	2002 VX_{11}	—	November 1, 2002	Palomar	NEAT	(5)	1.9 km	MPC · JPL
151593	2002 VL_{22}	—	November 5, 2002	Socorro	LINEAR	·	1.1 km	MPC · JPL
151594	2002 VL_{31}	—	November 5, 2002	Socorro	LINEAR	·	2.0 km	MPC · JPL
151595	2002 VA_{34}	—	November 5, 2002	Socorro	LINEAR	·	1.3 km	MPC · JPL
151596	2002 VM_{34}	—	November 5, 2002	Socorro	LINEAR	·	2.7 km	MPC · JPL
151597	2002 VZ_{36}	—	November 2, 2002	Haleakala	NEAT	·	1.1 km	MPC · JPL
151598	2002 VL_{37}	—	November 4, 2002	Palomar	NEAT	·	1.1 km	MPC · JPL
151599	2002 VK_{40}	—	November 5, 2002	Socorro	LINEAR	·	1.3 km	MPC · JPL
151600	2002 VG_{44}	—	November 4, 2002	Haleakala	NEAT	V	990 m	MPC · JPL

== 151601–151700 ==
back to top

Designation			Discovery			Properties		Ref
Permanent	Provisional	Named after	Date	Site	Discoverer(s)	Category	Diam.	Ref
151601	2002 VJ_{47}	—	November 5, 2002	Anderson Mesa	LONEOS	·	1.3 km	MPC · JPL
151602	2002 VX_{47}	—	November 5, 2002	Socorro	LINEAR	·	1.2 km	MPC · JPL
151603	2002 VG_{51}	—	November 6, 2002	Anderson Mesa	LONEOS	·	1.3 km	MPC · JPL
151604	2002 VC_{61}	—	November 5, 2002	Socorro	LINEAR	·	2.6 km	MPC · JPL
151605	2002 VJ_{61}	—	November 5, 2002	Socorro	LINEAR	·	1.3 km	MPC · JPL
151606	2002 VU_{61}	—	November 5, 2002	Socorro	LINEAR	·	1.2 km	MPC · JPL
151607	2002 VV_{70}	—	November 7, 2002	Socorro	LINEAR	·	1.2 km	MPC · JPL
151608	2002 VA_{73}	—	November 7, 2002	Socorro	LINEAR	·	1.6 km	MPC · JPL
151609	2002 VZ_{74}	—	November 7, 2002	Socorro	LINEAR	·	1.4 km	MPC · JPL
151610	2002 VU_{79}	—	November 7, 2002	Socorro	LINEAR	·	1.8 km	MPC · JPL
151611	2002 VY_{80}	—	November 7, 2002	Socorro	LINEAR	·	1.6 km	MPC · JPL
151612	2002 VR_{84}	—	November 7, 2002	Socorro	LINEAR	PHO	5.9 km	MPC · JPL
151613	2002 VT_{91}	—	November 12, 2002	Socorro	LINEAR	V	1.2 km	MPC · JPL
151614	2002 VS_{93}	—	November 12, 2002	Socorro	LINEAR	·	1.7 km	MPC · JPL
151615	2002 VR_{97}	—	November 12, 2002	Socorro	LINEAR	·	1.3 km	MPC · JPL
151616	2002 VW_{99}	—	November 13, 2002	Palomar	NEAT	·	3.1 km	MPC · JPL
151617	2002 VQ_{100}	—	November 11, 2002	Anderson Mesa	LONEOS	·	1.4 km	MPC · JPL
151618	2002 VZ_{102}	—	November 12, 2002	Socorro	LINEAR	·	1.4 km	MPC · JPL
151619	2002 VB_{105}	—	November 12, 2002	Socorro	LINEAR	·	1.6 km	MPC · JPL
151620	2002 VK_{108}	—	November 12, 2002	Socorro	LINEAR	·	1.5 km	MPC · JPL
151621	2002 VH_{114}	—	November 13, 2002	Palomar	NEAT	MAS	960 m	MPC · JPL
151622	2002 VX_{121}	—	November 13, 2002	Palomar	NEAT	·	1.2 km	MPC · JPL
151623	2002 VF_{123}	—	November 13, 2002	Palomar	NEAT	·	1.2 km	MPC · JPL
151624	2002 WS_{6}	—	November 24, 2002	Palomar	NEAT	V	1.1 km	MPC · JPL
151625	2002 WP_{7}	—	November 24, 2002	Palomar	NEAT	MAS	880 m	MPC · JPL
151626	2002 WQ_{9}	—	November 24, 2002	Palomar	NEAT	·	1.3 km	MPC · JPL
151627	2002 WB_{12}	—	November 27, 2002	Anderson Mesa	LONEOS	PHO	1.6 km	MPC · JPL
151628	2002 WA_{17}	—	November 28, 2002	Haleakala	NEAT	·	2.0 km	MPC · JPL
151629	2002 WP_{17}	—	November 30, 2002	Socorro	LINEAR	·	2.8 km	MPC · JPL
151630	2002 WO_{19}	—	November 24, 2002	Palomar	S. F. Hönig	·	1.2 km	MPC · JPL
151631	2002 XN	—	December 1, 2002	Socorro	LINEAR	·	1.2 km	MPC · JPL
151632	2002 XC_{4}	—	December 1, 2002	Socorro	LINEAR	·	1.3 km	MPC · JPL
151633	2002 XL_{7}	—	December 2, 2002	Socorro	LINEAR	·	1.5 km	MPC · JPL
151634	2002 XX_{19}	—	December 2, 2002	Socorro	LINEAR	·	1.1 km	MPC · JPL
151635	2002 XY_{22}	—	December 3, 2002	Haleakala	NEAT	·	960 m	MPC · JPL
151636	2002 XO_{27}	—	December 5, 2002	Socorro	LINEAR	·	1.5 km	MPC · JPL
151637	2002 XN_{28}	—	December 5, 2002	Socorro	LINEAR	·	1.6 km	MPC · JPL
151638	2002 XV_{28}	—	December 5, 2002	Socorro	LINEAR	·	1.1 km	MPC · JPL
151639	2002 XF_{31}	—	December 6, 2002	Socorro	LINEAR	·	1.3 km	MPC · JPL
151640	2002 XC_{33}	—	December 6, 2002	Socorro	LINEAR	·	1.2 km	MPC · JPL
151641	2002 XM_{38}	—	December 6, 2002	Socorro	LINEAR	EOS	3.3 km	MPC · JPL
151642	2002 XG_{49}	—	December 10, 2002	Socorro	LINEAR	(5)	3.8 km	MPC · JPL
151643	2002 XH_{54}	—	December 10, 2002	Palomar	NEAT	·	2.7 km	MPC · JPL
151644	2002 XB_{57}	—	December 10, 2002	Socorro	LINEAR	·	2.2 km	MPC · JPL
151645	2002 XR_{60}	—	December 10, 2002	Socorro	LINEAR	·	1.3 km	MPC · JPL
151646	2002 XA_{66}	—	December 12, 2002	Socorro	LINEAR	PHO	2.1 km	MPC · JPL
151647	2002 XC_{66}	—	December 12, 2002	Socorro	LINEAR	·	2.5 km	MPC · JPL
151648	2002 XQ_{70}	—	December 10, 2002	Socorro	LINEAR	·	2.7 km	MPC · JPL
151649	2002 XL_{71}	—	December 10, 2002	Socorro	LINEAR	·	1.4 km	MPC · JPL
151650	2002 XN_{81}	—	December 11, 2002	Socorro	LINEAR	·	2.3 km	MPC · JPL
151651	2002 XS_{88}	—	December 14, 2002	Socorro	LINEAR	NYS	3.2 km	MPC · JPL
151652	2002 XF_{93}	—	December 5, 2002	Socorro	LINEAR	NYS	1.9 km	MPC · JPL
151653	2002 XB_{94}	—	December 3, 2002	Palomar	S. F. Hönig	·	1.5 km	MPC · JPL
151654	2002 XU_{95}	—	December 5, 2002	Socorro	LINEAR	MAS	880 m	MPC · JPL
151655	2002 XZ_{103}	—	December 5, 2002	Socorro	LINEAR	·	2.2 km	MPC · JPL
151656	2002 XC_{115}	—	December 10, 2002	Palomar	NEAT	·	1.2 km	MPC · JPL
151657 Finkbeiner	2002 XV_{115}	Finkbeiner	December 11, 2002	Apache Point	SDSS	·	1.9 km	MPC · JPL
151658	2002 YK	—	December 27, 2002	Anderson Mesa	LONEOS	·	3.9 km	MPC · JPL
151659 Egerszegi	2002 YF_{3}	Egerszegi	December 25, 2002	Piszkéstető	K. Sárneczky	·	3.0 km	MPC · JPL
151660	2002 YC_{6}	—	December 28, 2002	Kitt Peak	Spacewatch	·	3.5 km	MPC · JPL
151661	2002 YF_{8}	—	December 30, 2002	Socorro	LINEAR	·	2.0 km	MPC · JPL
151662	2002 YZ_{8}	—	December 31, 2002	Socorro	LINEAR	NYS	1.7 km	MPC · JPL
151663	2002 YF_{10}	—	December 31, 2002	Socorro	LINEAR	·	3.5 km	MPC · JPL
151664	2002 YJ_{12}	—	December 31, 2002	Kitt Peak	Spacewatch	·	1.5 km	MPC · JPL
151665	2002 YP_{19}	—	December 31, 2002	Socorro	LINEAR	NYS	1.4 km	MPC · JPL
151666	2002 YS_{19}	—	December 31, 2002	Socorro	LINEAR	·	1.9 km	MPC · JPL
151667	2002 YO_{23}	—	December 31, 2002	Socorro	LINEAR	·	2.0 km	MPC · JPL
151668	2002 YY_{26}	—	December 31, 2002	Socorro	LINEAR	·	2.9 km	MPC · JPL
151669	2002 YH_{27}	—	December 31, 2002	Socorro	LINEAR	NYS	1.8 km	MPC · JPL
151670	2002 YL_{27}	—	December 31, 2002	Socorro	LINEAR	·	1.9 km	MPC · JPL
151671	2002 YC_{29}	—	December 31, 2002	Socorro	LINEAR	·	2.1 km	MPC · JPL
151672	2003 AU	—	January 1, 2003	Socorro	LINEAR	·	1.9 km	MPC · JPL
151673	2003 AQ_{5}	—	January 1, 2003	Socorro	LINEAR	NYS	2.2 km	MPC · JPL
151674	2003 AQ_{6}	—	January 1, 2003	Kitt Peak	Spacewatch	·	2.1 km	MPC · JPL
151675	2003 AW_{7}	—	January 2, 2003	Socorro	LINEAR	·	1.6 km	MPC · JPL
151676	2003 AG_{10}	—	January 1, 2003	Socorro	LINEAR	·	1.4 km	MPC · JPL
151677	2003 AB_{12}	—	January 1, 2003	Socorro	LINEAR	·	1.8 km	MPC · JPL
151678	2003 AF_{16}	—	January 4, 2003	Socorro	LINEAR	·	1.9 km	MPC · JPL
151679	2003 AE_{20}	—	January 5, 2003	Socorro	LINEAR	DOR	3.8 km	MPC · JPL
151680	2003 AZ_{23}	—	January 4, 2003	Socorro	LINEAR	·	1.7 km	MPC · JPL
151681	2003 AR_{25}	—	January 4, 2003	Socorro	LINEAR	NYS	1.6 km	MPC · JPL
151682	2003 AQ_{28}	—	January 4, 2003	Socorro	LINEAR	MAS	1.4 km	MPC · JPL
151683	2003 AE_{29}	—	January 4, 2003	Socorro	LINEAR	NYS	2.0 km	MPC · JPL
151684	2003 AZ_{30}	—	January 4, 2003	Socorro	LINEAR	NYS	1.8 km	MPC · JPL
151685	2003 AU_{35}	—	January 7, 2003	Socorro	LINEAR	·	4.5 km	MPC · JPL
151686	2003 AP_{39}	—	January 7, 2003	Socorro	LINEAR	V	1.8 km	MPC · JPL
151687	2003 AK_{42}	—	January 7, 2003	Socorro	LINEAR	·	2.1 km	MPC · JPL
151688	2003 AQ_{46}	—	January 5, 2003	Socorro	LINEAR	·	2.9 km	MPC · JPL
151689	2003 AM_{49}	—	January 5, 2003	Socorro	LINEAR	·	1.9 km	MPC · JPL
151690	2003 AH_{53}	—	January 5, 2003	Socorro	LINEAR	NYS	1.8 km	MPC · JPL
151691	2003 AL_{53}	—	January 5, 2003	Socorro	LINEAR	·	2.8 km	MPC · JPL
151692	2003 AU_{53}	—	January 5, 2003	Socorro	LINEAR	·	2.1 km	MPC · JPL
151693	2003 AH_{55}	—	January 5, 2003	Socorro	LINEAR	·	2.4 km	MPC · JPL
151694	2003 AS_{58}	—	January 5, 2003	Socorro	LINEAR	·	2.6 km	MPC · JPL
151695	2003 AB_{64}	—	January 7, 2003	Bisei SG Center	BATTeRS	V	1.1 km	MPC · JPL
151696	2003 AX_{65}	—	January 7, 2003	Socorro	LINEAR	·	2.5 km	MPC · JPL
151697 Paolobattaini	2003 AF_{84}	Paolobattaini	January 15, 2003	Schiaparelli	L. Buzzi, Bellini, F.	NYS	1.8 km	MPC · JPL
151698	2003 AH_{84}	—	January 14, 2003	Campo Imperatore	CINEOS	NYS	1.8 km	MPC · JPL
151699	2003 AA_{94}	—	January 10, 2003	Socorro	LINEAR	·	2.6 km	MPC · JPL
151700	2003 BQ_{17}	—	January 27, 2003	Socorro	LINEAR	MAS	1.1 km	MPC · JPL

== 151701–151800 ==
back to top

Designation			Discovery			Properties		Ref
Permanent	Provisional	Named after	Date	Site	Discoverer(s)	Category	Diam.	Ref
151701	2003 BK_{18}	—	January 27, 2003	Socorro	LINEAR	·	1.6 km	MPC · JPL
151702	2003 BL_{20}	—	January 27, 2003	Socorro	LINEAR	·	6.9 km	MPC · JPL
151703	2003 BU_{21}	—	January 27, 2003	Haleakala	NEAT	·	2.8 km	MPC · JPL
151704	2003 BH_{28}	—	January 26, 2003	Palomar	NEAT	·	4.2 km	MPC · JPL
151705	2003 BE_{30}	—	January 27, 2003	Socorro	LINEAR	·	3.9 km	MPC · JPL
151706	2003 BT_{33}	—	January 28, 2003	Socorro	LINEAR	EUN	2.3 km	MPC · JPL
151707	2003 BQ_{34}	—	January 26, 2003	Haleakala	NEAT	·	1.6 km	MPC · JPL
151708	2003 BV_{34}	—	January 27, 2003	Anderson Mesa	LONEOS	NYS	2.1 km	MPC · JPL
151709	2003 BN_{37}	—	January 28, 2003	Kitt Peak	Spacewatch	·	1.9 km	MPC · JPL
151710	2003 BL_{39}	—	January 27, 2003	Socorro	LINEAR	NYS	2.3 km	MPC · JPL
151711	2003 BM_{39}	—	January 27, 2003	Socorro	LINEAR	·	1.3 km	MPC · JPL
151712	2003 BH_{40}	—	January 27, 2003	Haleakala	NEAT	MAS	1.1 km	MPC · JPL
151713	2003 BK_{40}	—	January 27, 2003	Haleakala	NEAT	·	2.4 km	MPC · JPL
151714	2003 BM_{43}	—	January 27, 2003	Socorro	LINEAR	·	2.4 km	MPC · JPL
151715	2003 BZ_{46}	—	January 28, 2003	Palomar	NEAT	·	2.6 km	MPC · JPL
151716	2003 BN_{48}	—	January 26, 2003	Anderson Mesa	LONEOS	·	2.8 km	MPC · JPL
151717	2003 BR_{49}	—	January 27, 2003	Anderson Mesa	LONEOS	·	3.0 km	MPC · JPL
151718	2003 BL_{53}	—	January 27, 2003	Anderson Mesa	LONEOS	·	2.1 km	MPC · JPL
151719	2003 BN_{56}	—	January 29, 2003	Palomar	NEAT	·	2.1 km	MPC · JPL
151720	2003 BR_{58}	—	January 27, 2003	Socorro	LINEAR	NYS	1.7 km	MPC · JPL
151721	2003 BT_{58}	—	January 27, 2003	Socorro	LINEAR	·	2.2 km	MPC · JPL
151722	2003 BU_{61}	—	January 28, 2003	Socorro	LINEAR	NYS	1.5 km	MPC · JPL
151723	2003 BX_{63}	—	January 28, 2003	Socorro	LINEAR	·	2.5 km	MPC · JPL
151724	2003 BU_{65}	—	January 30, 2003	Socorro	LINEAR	·	3.2 km	MPC · JPL
151725	2003 BF_{73}	—	January 28, 2003	Haleakala	NEAT	·	2.0 km	MPC · JPL
151726	2003 BN_{76}	—	January 29, 2003	Palomar	NEAT	·	2.0 km	MPC · JPL
151727	2003 BQ_{80}	—	January 31, 2003	Socorro	LINEAR	·	2.6 km	MPC · JPL
151728	2003 BQ_{81}	—	January 31, 2003	Socorro	LINEAR	ERI	3.3 km	MPC · JPL
151729	2003 BY_{83}	—	January 31, 2003	Socorro	LINEAR	EUN	1.8 km	MPC · JPL
151730	2003 BJ_{84}	—	January 30, 2003	Anderson Mesa	LONEOS	·	2.0 km	MPC · JPL
151731	2003 BA_{86}	—	January 23, 2003	Kitt Peak	Spacewatch	·	2.4 km	MPC · JPL
151732	2003 BG_{87}	—	January 26, 2003	Kitt Peak	Spacewatch	·	2.3 km	MPC · JPL
151733	2003 BA_{88}	—	January 27, 2003	Socorro	LINEAR	NYS	1.6 km	MPC · JPL
151734	2003 BH_{89}	—	January 28, 2003	Kitt Peak	Spacewatch	KOR	2.0 km	MPC · JPL
151735	2003 BO_{90}	—	January 30, 2003	Anderson Mesa	LONEOS	NYS	2.0 km	MPC · JPL
151736	2003 CQ	—	February 1, 2003	Anderson Mesa	LONEOS	PHO	4.6 km	MPC · JPL
151737	2003 CV_{6}	—	February 1, 2003	Socorro	LINEAR	ADE	2.9 km	MPC · JPL
151738	2003 CB_{7}	—	February 1, 2003	Socorro	LINEAR	MAS	1.3 km	MPC · JPL
151739	2003 CU_{9}	—	February 2, 2003	Anderson Mesa	LONEOS	·	2.1 km	MPC · JPL
151740	2003 CO_{13}	—	February 4, 2003	Anderson Mesa	LONEOS	·	4.5 km	MPC · JPL
151741	2003 CT_{14}	—	February 3, 2003	Haleakala	NEAT	·	1.7 km	MPC · JPL
151742	2003 CW_{19}	—	February 9, 2003	Palomar	NEAT	(5)	1.6 km	MPC · JPL
151743	2003 CE_{21}	—	February 1, 2003	Socorro	LINEAR	EUN	2.1 km	MPC · JPL
151744	2003 CA_{22}	—	February 11, 2003	Bergisch Gladbach	W. Bickel	EUN	2.1 km	MPC · JPL
151745	2003 DG_{3}	—	February 22, 2003	Palomar	NEAT	MAR	1.6 km	MPC · JPL
151746	2003 DQ_{7}	—	February 22, 2003	Kitt Peak	Spacewatch	·	2.1 km	MPC · JPL
151747	2003 DM_{11}	—	February 25, 2003	Haleakala	NEAT	MAS	1.1 km	MPC · JPL
151748	2003 DY_{16}	—	February 21, 2003	Palomar	NEAT	slow	1.7 km	MPC · JPL
151749	2003 DF_{18}	—	February 19, 2003	Palomar	NEAT	·	2.5 km	MPC · JPL
151750	2003 DR_{18}	—	February 21, 2003	Palomar	NEAT	·	1.7 km	MPC · JPL
151751	2003 DT_{18}	—	February 21, 2003	Palomar	NEAT	·	1.7 km	MPC · JPL
151752	2003 DZ_{23}	—	February 28, 2003	Socorro	LINEAR	·	3.1 km	MPC · JPL
151753	2003 EX	—	March 5, 2003	Socorro	LINEAR	·	4.8 km	MPC · JPL
151754	2003 EF_{2}	—	March 5, 2003	Socorro	LINEAR	MAS	1.2 km	MPC · JPL
151755	2003 EG_{2}	—	March 5, 2003	Socorro	LINEAR	·	2.8 km	MPC · JPL
151756	2003 EN_{3}	—	March 6, 2003	Socorro	LINEAR	·	2.0 km	MPC · JPL
151757	2003 EG_{6}	—	March 6, 2003	Anderson Mesa	LONEOS	·	2.1 km	MPC · JPL
151758	2003 EO_{6}	—	March 6, 2003	Anderson Mesa	LONEOS	·	1.5 km	MPC · JPL
151759	2003 EF_{9}	—	March 6, 2003	Socorro	LINEAR	·	2.2 km	MPC · JPL
151760	2003 EH_{10}	—	March 6, 2003	Socorro	LINEAR	KON	3.5 km	MPC · JPL
151761	2003 EG_{11}	—	March 6, 2003	Socorro	LINEAR	·	5.1 km	MPC · JPL
151762	2003 EP_{11}	—	March 6, 2003	Socorro	LINEAR	(5)	2.0 km	MPC · JPL
151763	2003 ET_{12}	—	March 6, 2003	Socorro	LINEAR	·	3.3 km	MPC · JPL
151764	2003 EX_{12}	—	March 6, 2003	Socorro	LINEAR	·	2.8 km	MPC · JPL
151765	2003 EB_{19}	—	March 6, 2003	Anderson Mesa	LONEOS	·	2.6 km	MPC · JPL
151766	2003 EL_{19}	—	March 6, 2003	Anderson Mesa	LONEOS	·	1.9 km	MPC · JPL
151767	2003 EY_{20}	—	March 6, 2003	Anderson Mesa	LONEOS	·	2.5 km	MPC · JPL
151768	2003 EX_{22}	—	March 6, 2003	Socorro	LINEAR	·	3.8 km	MPC · JPL
151769	2003 EK_{24}	—	March 6, 2003	Socorro	LINEAR	·	1.6 km	MPC · JPL
151770	2003 EO_{24}	—	March 6, 2003	Socorro	LINEAR	·	2.0 km	MPC · JPL
151771	2003 EV_{25}	—	March 6, 2003	Socorro	LINEAR	·	2.1 km	MPC · JPL
151772	2003 EW_{25}	—	March 6, 2003	Anderson Mesa	LONEOS	·	2.6 km	MPC · JPL
151773	2003 EK_{26}	—	March 6, 2003	Anderson Mesa	LONEOS	(5)	2.0 km	MPC · JPL
151774	2003 EZ_{29}	—	March 6, 2003	Palomar	NEAT	NYS	2.1 km	MPC · JPL
151775	2003 EV_{34}	—	March 7, 2003	Socorro	LINEAR	·	2.8 km	MPC · JPL
151776	2003 EZ_{41}	—	March 9, 2003	Campo Imperatore	CINEOS	·	2.1 km	MPC · JPL
151777	2003 EW_{46}	—	March 8, 2003	Kitt Peak	Spacewatch	·	2.9 km	MPC · JPL
151778	2003 EE_{47}	—	March 8, 2003	Socorro	LINEAR	(194)	2.5 km	MPC · JPL
151779	2003 EP_{47}	—	March 9, 2003	Socorro	LINEAR	RAF	1.3 km	MPC · JPL
151780	2003 EX_{47}	—	March 9, 2003	Anderson Mesa	LONEOS	·	4.1 km	MPC · JPL
151781	2003 EJ_{49}	—	March 10, 2003	Anderson Mesa	LONEOS	·	2.8 km	MPC · JPL
151782	2003 ES_{53}	—	March 10, 2003	Socorro	LINEAR	EUN	2.5 km	MPC · JPL
151783	2003 EJ_{58}	—	March 12, 2003	Socorro	LINEAR	·	3.1 km	MPC · JPL
151784	2003 EL_{58}	—	March 12, 2003	Palomar	NEAT	·	4.8 km	MPC · JPL
151785	2003 FZ_{3}	—	March 25, 2003	Haleakala	NEAT	HNS	2.8 km	MPC · JPL
151786	2003 FL_{13}	—	March 23, 2003	Kitt Peak	Spacewatch	AGN	1.7 km	MPC · JPL
151787	2003 FS_{18}	—	March 24, 2003	Kitt Peak	Spacewatch	·	1.9 km	MPC · JPL
151788	2003 FJ_{24}	—	March 23, 2003	Catalina	CSS	·	1.9 km	MPC · JPL
151789	2003 FH_{32}	—	March 23, 2003	Kitt Peak	Spacewatch	·	2.6 km	MPC · JPL
151790	2003 FL_{32}	—	March 23, 2003	Kitt Peak	Spacewatch	·	2.8 km	MPC · JPL
151791	2003 FE_{33}	—	March 23, 2003	Kitt Peak	Spacewatch	MRX	1.2 km	MPC · JPL
151792	2003 FH_{33}	—	March 23, 2003	Kitt Peak	Spacewatch	·	3.2 km	MPC · JPL
151793	2003 FB_{42}	—	March 26, 2003	Kitt Peak	Spacewatch	EUN	2.1 km	MPC · JPL
151794	2003 FX_{42}	—	March 23, 2003	Catalina	CSS	·	3.5 km	MPC · JPL
151795	2003 FJ_{45}	—	March 24, 2003	Kitt Peak	Spacewatch	·	1.5 km	MPC · JPL
151796	2003 FZ_{47}	—	March 24, 2003	Kitt Peak	Spacewatch	·	2.8 km	MPC · JPL
151797	2003 FP_{54}	—	March 25, 2003	Haleakala	NEAT	·	4.2 km	MPC · JPL
151798	2003 FV_{54}	—	March 25, 2003	Haleakala	NEAT	·	2.4 km	MPC · JPL
151799	2003 FN_{56}	—	March 26, 2003	Palomar	NEAT	·	3.5 km	MPC · JPL
151800	2003 FE_{57}	—	March 26, 2003	Palomar	NEAT	·	2.6 km	MPC · JPL

== 151801–151900 ==
back to top

Designation			Discovery			Properties		Ref
Permanent	Provisional	Named after	Date	Site	Discoverer(s)	Category	Diam.	Ref
151801	2003 FK_{57}	—	March 26, 2003	Palomar	NEAT	·	2.4 km	MPC · JPL
151802	2003 FS_{57}	—	March 26, 2003	Kitt Peak	Spacewatch	HNS	1.9 km	MPC · JPL
151803	2003 FE_{58}	—	March 26, 2003	Palomar	NEAT	·	1.9 km	MPC · JPL
151804	2003 FV_{58}	—	March 26, 2003	Palomar	NEAT	·	1.9 km	MPC · JPL
151805	2003 FO_{61}	—	March 26, 2003	Palomar	NEAT	·	2.0 km	MPC · JPL
151806	2003 FO_{64}	—	March 26, 2003	Palomar	NEAT	·	3.5 km	MPC · JPL
151807	2003 FG_{75}	—	March 27, 2003	Campo Imperatore	CINEOS	·	1.8 km	MPC · JPL
151808	2003 FX_{77}	—	March 27, 2003	Palomar	NEAT	·	2.6 km	MPC · JPL
151809	2003 FB_{79}	—	March 27, 2003	Kitt Peak	Spacewatch	·	3.6 km	MPC · JPL
151810	2003 FF_{82}	—	March 27, 2003	Kitt Peak	Spacewatch	·	4.0 km	MPC · JPL
151811	2003 FR_{82}	—	March 27, 2003	Palomar	NEAT	·	3.2 km	MPC · JPL
151812	2003 FE_{84}	—	March 28, 2003	Anderson Mesa	LONEOS	HNS	2.1 km	MPC · JPL
151813	2003 FF_{87}	—	March 28, 2003	Kitt Peak	Spacewatch	·	2.4 km	MPC · JPL
151814	2003 FP_{87}	—	March 28, 2003	Palomar	NEAT	·	4.3 km	MPC · JPL
151815	2003 FH_{89}	—	March 29, 2003	Anderson Mesa	LONEOS	·	2.1 km	MPC · JPL
151816	2003 FF_{90}	—	March 29, 2003	Anderson Mesa	LONEOS	·	4.1 km	MPC · JPL
151817	2003 FK_{93}	—	March 29, 2003	Anderson Mesa	LONEOS	·	2.3 km	MPC · JPL
151818	2003 FW_{93}	—	March 29, 2003	Anderson Mesa	LONEOS	·	3.1 km	MPC · JPL
151819	2003 FM_{94}	—	March 29, 2003	Anderson Mesa	LONEOS	ADE	5.2 km	MPC · JPL
151820	2003 FW_{96}	—	March 30, 2003	Kitt Peak	Spacewatch	·	3.4 km	MPC · JPL
151821	2003 FB_{97}	—	March 30, 2003	Kitt Peak	Spacewatch	·	2.7 km	MPC · JPL
151822	2003 FW_{98}	—	March 30, 2003	Socorro	LINEAR	(5)	2.3 km	MPC · JPL
151823	2003 FK_{99}	—	March 30, 2003	Socorro	LINEAR	·	4.6 km	MPC · JPL
151824	2003 FD_{100}	—	March 31, 2003	Anderson Mesa	LONEOS	·	3.7 km	MPC · JPL
151825	2003 FY_{101}	—	March 31, 2003	Socorro	LINEAR	·	1.6 km	MPC · JPL
151826	2003 FE_{104}	—	March 25, 2003	Haleakala	NEAT	·	2.2 km	MPC · JPL
151827	2003 FX_{106}	—	March 27, 2003	Anderson Mesa	LONEOS	ADE	5.9 km	MPC · JPL
151828	2003 FL_{107}	—	March 30, 2003	Socorro	LINEAR	·	4.4 km	MPC · JPL
151829	2003 FO_{108}	—	March 31, 2003	Anderson Mesa	LONEOS	·	5.3 km	MPC · JPL
151830	2003 FN_{109}	—	March 31, 2003	Kitt Peak	Spacewatch	JUN	1.4 km	MPC · JPL
151831	2003 FR_{115}	—	March 31, 2003	Socorro	LINEAR	·	3.6 km	MPC · JPL
151832	2003 FN_{117}	—	March 25, 2003	Palomar	NEAT	·	2.0 km	MPC · JPL
151833	2003 FE_{120}	—	March 23, 2003	Goodricke-Pigott	Goodricke-Pigott	·	2.6 km	MPC · JPL
151834 Mongkut	2003 FB_{122}	Mongkut	March 26, 2003	Goodricke-Pigott	Reddy, V.	·	3.5 km	MPC · JPL
151835 Christinarichey	2003 FC_{122}	Christinarichey	March 27, 2003	Goodricke-Pigott	Reddy, V.	·	2.6 km	MPC · JPL
151836	2003 FH_{126}	—	March 31, 2003	Kitt Peak	Spacewatch	(5)	1.8 km	MPC · JPL
151837	2003 FP_{130}	—	March 25, 2003	Kitt Peak	Spacewatch	·	2.7 km	MPC · JPL
151838	2003 GJ_{1}	—	April 1, 2003	Socorro	LINEAR	·	2.7 km	MPC · JPL
151839	2003 GK_{3}	—	April 1, 2003	Socorro	LINEAR	WIT	1.7 km	MPC · JPL
151840	2003 GF_{4}	—	April 1, 2003	Socorro	LINEAR	EUN	2.3 km	MPC · JPL
151841	2003 GU_{8}	—	April 1, 2003	Socorro	LINEAR	·	3.1 km	MPC · JPL
151842	2003 GT_{9}	—	April 2, 2003	Socorro	LINEAR	·	2.3 km	MPC · JPL
151843	2003 GS_{12}	—	April 1, 2003	Socorro	LINEAR	·	2.8 km	MPC · JPL
151844	2003 GP_{13}	—	April 4, 2003	Kitt Peak	Spacewatch	KOR	1.7 km	MPC · JPL
151845	2003 GA_{15}	—	April 3, 2003	Haleakala	NEAT	·	4.9 km	MPC · JPL
151846	2003 GH_{15}	—	April 4, 2003	Haleakala	NEAT	EUN	2.2 km	MPC · JPL
151847	2003 GT_{17}	—	April 3, 2003	Anderson Mesa	LONEOS	·	2.6 km	MPC · JPL
151848	2003 GD_{26}	—	April 4, 2003	Kitt Peak	Spacewatch	·	2.6 km	MPC · JPL
151849	2003 GN_{29}	—	April 7, 2003	Socorro	LINEAR	·	2.9 km	MPC · JPL
151850	2003 GK_{35}	—	April 7, 2003	Palomar	NEAT	·	3.0 km	MPC · JPL
151851	2003 GU_{36}	—	April 6, 2003	Anderson Mesa	LONEOS	·	2.3 km	MPC · JPL
151852	2003 GX_{36}	—	April 6, 2003	Anderson Mesa	LONEOS	·	2.3 km	MPC · JPL
151853	2003 GX_{42}	—	April 9, 2003	Palomar	NEAT	JUN	2.1 km	MPC · JPL
151854	2003 HT_{2}	—	April 22, 2003	Catalina	CSS	·	2.8 km	MPC · JPL
151855	2003 HH_{8}	—	April 25, 2003	Kitt Peak	Spacewatch	·	3.2 km	MPC · JPL
151856	2003 HC_{9}	—	April 24, 2003	Anderson Mesa	LONEOS	PAD	2.5 km	MPC · JPL
151857	2003 HG_{11}	—	April 26, 2003	Kitt Peak	Spacewatch	(12739)	2.3 km	MPC · JPL
151858	2003 HD_{15}	—	April 26, 2003	Haleakala	NEAT	·	4.7 km	MPC · JPL
151859	2003 HG_{23}	—	April 25, 2003	Kitt Peak	Spacewatch	·	2.0 km	MPC · JPL
151860	2003 HD_{24}	—	April 26, 2003	Kitt Peak	Spacewatch	KOR	2.0 km	MPC · JPL
151861	2003 HB_{27}	—	April 27, 2003	Anderson Mesa	LONEOS	·	3.6 km	MPC · JPL
151862	2003 HD_{29}	—	April 28, 2003	Socorro	LINEAR	·	4.5 km	MPC · JPL
151863	2003 HP_{38}	—	April 29, 2003	Haleakala	NEAT	·	3.2 km	MPC · JPL
151864	2003 HO_{45}	—	April 29, 2003	Haleakala	NEAT	·	2.6 km	MPC · JPL
151865	2003 HQ_{47}	—	April 29, 2003	Anderson Mesa	LONEOS	·	3.0 km	MPC · JPL
151866	2003 HF_{48}	—	April 30, 2003	Socorro	LINEAR	BRA	3.3 km	MPC · JPL
151867	2003 HO_{54}	—	April 24, 2003	Anderson Mesa	LONEOS	·	4.1 km	MPC · JPL
151868	2003 HV_{54}	—	April 24, 2003	Haleakala	NEAT	·	2.8 km	MPC · JPL
151869	2003 JZ	—	May 1, 2003	Kitt Peak	Spacewatch	·	3.1 km	MPC · JPL
151870	2003 JG_{2}	—	May 1, 2003	Kitt Peak	Spacewatch	KOR	2.2 km	MPC · JPL
151871	2003 JN_{12}	—	May 5, 2003	Socorro	LINEAR	·	2.7 km	MPC · JPL
151872	2003 JD_{14}	—	May 8, 2003	Socorro	LINEAR	·	3.6 km	MPC · JPL
151873	2003 KL_{9}	—	May 24, 2003	Reedy Creek	J. Broughton	·	3.1 km	MPC · JPL
151874	2003 KQ_{17}	—	May 27, 2003	Anderson Mesa	LONEOS	·	2.4 km	MPC · JPL
151875	2003 KC_{28}	—	May 20, 2003	Nogales	Tenagra II	·	2.4 km	MPC · JPL
151876	2003 NH_{7}	—	July 7, 2003	Reedy Creek	J. Broughton	·	3.8 km	MPC · JPL
151877	2003 OU_{9}	—	July 25, 2003	Socorro	LINEAR	·	6.3 km	MPC · JPL
151878	2003 PZ_{4}	—	August 4, 2003	Socorro	LINEAR	·	3.9 km	MPC · JPL
151879	2003 RF_{3}	—	September 1, 2003	Socorro	LINEAR	·	4.6 km	MPC · JPL
151880	2003 SF_{151}	—	September 17, 2003	Socorro	LINEAR	slow	7.6 km	MPC · JPL
151881	2003 SC_{209}	—	September 24, 2003	Palomar	NEAT	·	6.6 km	MPC · JPL
151882	2003 UW_{146}	—	October 18, 2003	Anderson Mesa	LONEOS	·	1.6 km	MPC · JPL
151883	2003 WQ_{25}	—	November 21, 2003	Socorro	LINEAR	L5	10 km	MPC · JPL
151884	2003 WO_{40}	—	November 19, 2003	Kitt Peak	Spacewatch	L5	20 km	MPC · JPL
151885	2003 XY_{21}	—	December 15, 2003	Nogales	Tenagra II	·	1.2 km	MPC · JPL
151886	2003 YO_{13}	—	December 17, 2003	Catalina	CSS	·	1.9 km	MPC · JPL
151887	2003 YY_{101}	—	December 19, 2003	Socorro	LINEAR	·	1.3 km	MPC · JPL
151888	2003 YV_{117}	—	December 27, 2003	Socorro	LINEAR	·	2.3 km	MPC · JPL
151889	2004 BG_{3}	—	January 16, 2004	Palomar	NEAT	·	1.7 km	MPC · JPL
151890	2004 BN_{80}	—	January 24, 2004	Socorro	LINEAR	·	1.3 km	MPC · JPL
151891	2004 BF_{84}	—	January 24, 2004	Socorro	LINEAR	·	4.6 km	MPC · JPL
151892	2004 BR_{91}	—	January 25, 2004	Haleakala	NEAT	·	3.7 km	MPC · JPL
151893	2004 BU_{106}	—	January 26, 2004	Anderson Mesa	LONEOS	·	1.3 km	MPC · JPL
151894	2004 CU_{24}	—	February 12, 2004	Palomar	NEAT	·	1.0 km	MPC · JPL
151895	2004 CN_{66}	—	February 15, 2004	Socorro	LINEAR	·	1.2 km	MPC · JPL
151896	2004 DA_{16}	—	February 17, 2004	Kitt Peak	Spacewatch	·	1.3 km	MPC · JPL
151897	2004 DK_{16}	—	February 17, 2004	Haleakala	NEAT	NYS	1.7 km	MPC · JPL
151898	2004 DK_{33}	—	February 18, 2004	Socorro	LINEAR	·	4.7 km	MPC · JPL
151899	2004 EP	—	March 11, 2004	Palomar	NEAT	·	1.8 km	MPC · JPL
151900	2004 EB_{7}	—	March 12, 2004	Palomar	NEAT	·	860 m	MPC · JPL

== 151901–152000 ==
back to top

Designation			Discovery			Properties		Ref
Permanent	Provisional	Named after	Date	Site	Discoverer(s)	Category	Diam.	Ref
151901	2004 EZ_{9}	—	March 11, 2004	Palomar	NEAT	·	1.1 km	MPC · JPL
151902	2004 EK_{10}	—	March 14, 2004	Kitt Peak	Spacewatch	·	1.1 km	MPC · JPL
151903	2004 EO_{13}	—	March 11, 2004	Palomar	NEAT	THB	4.0 km	MPC · JPL
151904	2004 EZ_{20}	—	March 12, 2004	Palomar	NEAT	·	750 m	MPC · JPL
151905	2004 EE_{21}	—	March 15, 2004	Kitt Peak	Spacewatch	NYS	1.2 km	MPC · JPL
151906	2004 EO_{27}	—	March 15, 2004	Kitt Peak	Spacewatch	·	830 m	MPC · JPL
151907	2004 EE_{38}	—	March 14, 2004	Catalina	CSS	·	1.2 km	MPC · JPL
151908	2004 EP_{38}	—	March 14, 2004	Kitt Peak	Spacewatch	·	1.3 km	MPC · JPL
151909	2004 ET_{39}	—	March 15, 2004	Kitt Peak	Spacewatch	·	1.2 km	MPC · JPL
151910	2004 EY_{39}	—	March 15, 2004	Socorro	LINEAR	NYS	1.7 km	MPC · JPL
151911	2004 EW_{42}	—	March 15, 2004	Catalina	CSS	·	2.0 km	MPC · JPL
151912	2004 EB_{43}	—	March 15, 2004	Catalina	CSS	·	1.4 km	MPC · JPL
151913	2004 EN_{54}	—	March 13, 2004	Palomar	NEAT	·	1.2 km	MPC · JPL
151914	2004 EO_{54}	—	March 13, 2004	Palomar	NEAT	·	970 m	MPC · JPL
151915	2004 EM_{56}	—	March 14, 2004	Palomar	NEAT	·	1.6 km	MPC · JPL
151916	2004 EX_{57}	—	March 15, 2004	Kitt Peak	Spacewatch	·	1.3 km	MPC · JPL
151917	2004 EY_{57}	—	March 15, 2004	Socorro	LINEAR	·	1.2 km	MPC · JPL
151918	2004 EW_{66}	—	March 14, 2004	Palomar	NEAT	·	1.8 km	MPC · JPL
151919	2004 EJ_{74}	—	March 13, 2004	Palomar	NEAT	·	2.6 km	MPC · JPL
151920	2004 EN_{78}	—	March 15, 2004	Catalina	CSS	·	2.5 km	MPC · JPL
151921	2004 EW_{86}	—	March 15, 2004	Catalina	CSS	·	1.8 km	MPC · JPL
151922	2004 EY_{86}	—	March 15, 2004	Kitt Peak	Spacewatch	·	2.3 km	MPC · JPL
151923	2004 EE_{94}	—	March 15, 2004	Catalina	CSS	·	1.7 km	MPC · JPL
151924	2004 EW_{107}	—	March 15, 2004	Kitt Peak	Spacewatch	·	750 m	MPC · JPL
151925	2004 FD_{6}	—	March 22, 2004	Needville	J. Dellinger, Lowe, A.	·	940 m	MPC · JPL
151926	2004 FR_{11}	—	March 16, 2004	Catalina	CSS	·	1.2 km	MPC · JPL
151927	2004 FP_{15}	—	March 16, 2004	Siding Spring	SSS	·	2.3 km	MPC · JPL
151928	2004 FG_{19}	—	March 16, 2004	Catalina	CSS	·	1.4 km	MPC · JPL
151929	2004 FM_{20}	—	March 16, 2004	Catalina	CSS	·	1.2 km	MPC · JPL
151930	2004 FA_{22}	—	March 16, 2004	Socorro	LINEAR	·	5.9 km	MPC · JPL
151931	2004 FQ_{25}	—	March 17, 2004	Socorro	LINEAR	·	3.3 km	MPC · JPL
151932	2004 FR_{26}	—	March 17, 2004	Kitt Peak	Spacewatch	·	1.1 km	MPC · JPL
151933	2004 FZ_{26}	—	March 17, 2004	Kitt Peak	Spacewatch	·	2.1 km	MPC · JPL
151934	2004 FT_{36}	—	March 16, 2004	Kitt Peak	Spacewatch	·	1.6 km	MPC · JPL
151935	2004 FP_{44}	—	March 16, 2004	Socorro	LINEAR	·	1.6 km	MPC · JPL
151936	2004 FB_{45}	—	March 16, 2004	Socorro	LINEAR	·	1.3 km	MPC · JPL
151937	2004 FD_{53}	—	March 19, 2004	Socorro	LINEAR	·	1.6 km	MPC · JPL
151938	2004 FB_{63}	—	March 19, 2004	Socorro	LINEAR	·	1.0 km	MPC · JPL
151939	2004 FC_{64}	—	March 19, 2004	Socorro	LINEAR	·	1.3 km	MPC · JPL
151940	2004 FO_{80}	—	March 22, 2004	Socorro	LINEAR	MAS	960 m	MPC · JPL
151941	2004 FY_{87}	—	March 19, 2004	Kitt Peak	Spacewatch	·	1.5 km	MPC · JPL
151942	2004 FL_{95}	—	March 22, 2004	Socorro	LINEAR	·	1.0 km	MPC · JPL
151943	2004 FN_{95}	—	March 22, 2004	Socorro	LINEAR	·	1.2 km	MPC · JPL
151944	2004 FL_{97}	—	March 23, 2004	Socorro	LINEAR	·	980 m	MPC · JPL
151945	2004 FY_{106}	—	March 20, 2004	Socorro	LINEAR	·	1.6 km	MPC · JPL
151946	2004 FR_{116}	—	March 23, 2004	Socorro	LINEAR	·	1.7 km	MPC · JPL
151947	2004 FK_{117}	—	March 27, 2004	Catalina	CSS	·	1.1 km	MPC · JPL
151948	2004 FA_{119}	—	March 22, 2004	Socorro	LINEAR	·	1.6 km	MPC · JPL
151949	2004 FN_{125}	—	March 27, 2004	Socorro	LINEAR	·	2.4 km	MPC · JPL
151950	2004 FM_{128}	—	March 27, 2004	Socorro	LINEAR	·	1.3 km	MPC · JPL
151951	2004 FO_{131}	—	March 22, 2004	Anderson Mesa	LONEOS	·	1.4 km	MPC · JPL
151952	2004 FO_{139}	—	March 25, 2004	Anderson Mesa	LONEOS	·	970 m	MPC · JPL
151953	2004 FB_{145}	—	March 29, 2004	Kitt Peak	Spacewatch	·	1.2 km	MPC · JPL
151954	2004 GO_{1}	—	April 10, 2004	Palomar	NEAT	·	2.9 km	MPC · JPL
151955	2004 GH_{3}	—	April 9, 2004	Siding Spring	SSS	·	1.0 km	MPC · JPL
151956	2004 GV_{3}	—	April 10, 2004	Catalina	CSS	·	3.5 km	MPC · JPL
151957	2004 GE_{14}	—	April 13, 2004	Catalina	CSS	·	2.1 km	MPC · JPL
151958	2004 GR_{20}	—	April 10, 2004	Palomar	NEAT	·	3.4 km	MPC · JPL
151959	2004 GY_{20}	—	April 11, 2004	Palomar	NEAT	·	1.1 km	MPC · JPL
151960	2004 GJ_{24}	—	April 13, 2004	Catalina	CSS	·	1.7 km	MPC · JPL
151961	2004 GK_{29}	—	April 12, 2004	Anderson Mesa	LONEOS	·	1.1 km	MPC · JPL
151962	2004 GG_{30}	—	April 12, 2004	Palomar	NEAT	V	1.1 km	MPC · JPL
151963	2004 GT_{30}	—	April 12, 2004	Anderson Mesa	LONEOS	(2076)	1.4 km	MPC · JPL
151964	2004 GH_{31}	—	April 15, 2004	Anderson Mesa	LONEOS	·	940 m	MPC · JPL
151965	2004 GT_{31}	—	April 15, 2004	Anderson Mesa	LONEOS	·	2.5 km	MPC · JPL
151966	2004 GG_{33}	—	April 12, 2004	Palomar	NEAT	·	990 m	MPC · JPL
151967	2004 GT_{36}	—	April 13, 2004	Palomar	NEAT	·	2.0 km	MPC · JPL
151968	2004 GC_{37}	—	April 14, 2004	Anderson Mesa	LONEOS	·	900 m	MPC · JPL
151969	2004 GE_{39}	—	April 15, 2004	Catalina	CSS	·	2.7 km	MPC · JPL
151970	2004 GR_{50}	—	April 13, 2004	Palomar	NEAT	·	990 m	MPC · JPL
151971	2004 GX_{70}	—	April 15, 2004	Anderson Mesa	LONEOS	(2076)	1.2 km	MPC · JPL
151972	2004 GK_{73}	—	April 15, 2004	Anderson Mesa	LONEOS	·	2.7 km	MPC · JPL
151973	2004 GQ_{75}	—	April 15, 2004	Anderson Mesa	LONEOS	·	1.2 km	MPC · JPL
151974	2004 GM_{76}	—	April 15, 2004	Socorro	LINEAR	·	1.3 km	MPC · JPL
151975	2004 HU_{1}	—	April 20, 2004	Desert Eagle	W. K. Y. Yeung	·	1.5 km	MPC · JPL
151976	2004 HW_{5}	—	April 17, 2004	Socorro	LINEAR	·	1.3 km	MPC · JPL
151977	2004 HK_{6}	—	April 17, 2004	Socorro	LINEAR	·	1.3 km	MPC · JPL
151978	2004 HO_{6}	—	April 17, 2004	Socorro	LINEAR	PHO	2.5 km	MPC · JPL
151979	2004 HO_{9}	—	April 17, 2004	Socorro	LINEAR	·	1.1 km	MPC · JPL
151980	2004 HR_{9}	—	April 17, 2004	Socorro	LINEAR	·	2.2 km	MPC · JPL
151981	2004 HC_{11}	—	April 19, 2004	Socorro	LINEAR	·	1.1 km	MPC · JPL
151982	2004 HW_{15}	—	April 16, 2004	Socorro	LINEAR	·	3.5 km	MPC · JPL
151983	2004 HF_{16}	—	April 16, 2004	Siding Spring	SSS	·	1.2 km	MPC · JPL
151984	2004 HY_{17}	—	April 17, 2004	Socorro	LINEAR	·	1.6 km	MPC · JPL
151985	2004 HM_{19}	—	April 20, 2004	Kitt Peak	Spacewatch	·	2.6 km	MPC · JPL
151986	2004 HD_{26}	—	April 19, 2004	Socorro	LINEAR	NYS	1.7 km	MPC · JPL
151987	2004 HJ_{26}	—	April 19, 2004	Socorro	LINEAR	NYS	2.2 km	MPC · JPL
151988	2004 HO_{28}	—	April 20, 2004	Socorro	LINEAR	·	1.3 km	MPC · JPL
151989	2004 HT_{28}	—	April 20, 2004	Socorro	LINEAR	·	1.7 km	MPC · JPL
151990	2004 HV_{43}	—	April 21, 2004	Socorro	LINEAR	·	1.5 km	MPC · JPL
151991	2004 HO_{52}	—	April 24, 2004	Socorro	LINEAR	NYS	1.7 km	MPC · JPL
151992	2004 HY_{52}	—	April 25, 2004	Socorro	LINEAR	·	1.4 km	MPC · JPL
151993	2004 HX_{57}	—	April 21, 2004	Kitt Peak	Spacewatch	·	1.4 km	MPC · JPL
151994	2004 HH_{61}	—	April 25, 2004	Socorro	LINEAR	·	1.1 km	MPC · JPL
151995	2004 HQ_{61}	—	April 29, 2004	Socorro	LINEAR	V	1.1 km	MPC · JPL
151996	2004 HM_{65}	—	April 17, 2004	Socorro	LINEAR	·	1.4 km	MPC · JPL
151997 Bauhinia	2004 JL_{1}	Bauhinia	May 11, 2004	Desert Eagle	W. K. Y. Yeung	·	920 m	MPC · JPL
151998	2004 JY_{13}	—	May 9, 2004	Kitt Peak	Spacewatch	·	1.1 km	MPC · JPL
151999	2004 JD_{14}	—	May 9, 2004	Palomar	NEAT	MAS	1.0 km	MPC · JPL
152000	2004 JD_{18}	—	May 13, 2004	Anderson Mesa	LONEOS	·	1.4 km	MPC · JPL

back to top

== See also ==
- Meanings of minor-planet names: 151001–152000
