= List of minor planets: 804001–805000 =

The following is a partial list of minor planets, running from minor-planet number 804001 through 805000, inclusive. The primary data for this and other partial lists is based on JPL's "Small-Body Orbital Elements" and data available from the Minor Planet Center. Critical list information is also provided by the MPC, unless otherwise specified from Lowell Observatory. A detailed description of the table's columns and additional sources are given on the main page including a complete list of every page in this series, and a statistical break-up on the dynamical classification of minor planets.

Also see the summary list of all named bodies in numerical and alphabetical order, and the corresponding naming citations for the number range of this particular list. New namings may only be added to this list after official publication, as the preannouncement of names is condemned by the Working Group for Small Bodies Nomenclature of the International Astronomical Union.

Near-Earth obj.	MBA (inner)	MBA (outer)	Centaur
Mars-crosser	MBA (middle)	Jupiter trojan	Trans-Neptunian obj.
Unclassified

== 804001–804100 ==
Designation			Discovery			Properties		Ref
Permanent	Provisional	Named after	Date	Site	Discoverer(s)	Category	Diam.	Ref
804001	2015 TQ_{403}	—	October 8, 2015	Haleakala	Pan-STARRS 1	·	770 m	MPC · JPL
804002	2015 TB_{404}	—	October 3, 2015	Haleakala	Pan-STARRS 1	·	2.4 km	MPC · JPL
804003	2015 TT_{409}	—	October 9, 2015	Haleakala	Pan-STARRS 1	EUN	680 m	MPC · JPL
804004	2015 TX_{409}	—	October 9, 2015	Haleakala	Pan-STARRS 1	·	810 m	MPC · JPL
804005	2015 TY_{410}	—	October 15, 2015	Haleakala	Pan-STARRS 1	·	740 m	MPC · JPL
804006	2015 TS_{411}	—	October 9, 2015	XuYi	PMO NEO Survey Program	·	770 m	MPC · JPL
804007	2015 TG_{412}	—	October 13, 2015	Haleakala	Pan-STARRS 1	·	2.4 km	MPC · JPL
804008	2015 TZ_{412}	—	October 12, 2015	Haleakala	Pan-STARRS 1	MAR	700 m	MPC · JPL
804009	2015 TE_{417}	—	October 8, 2015	Haleakala	Pan-STARRS 1	·	800 m	MPC · JPL
804010	2015 TG_{418}	—	October 10, 2015	Haleakala	Pan-STARRS 1	·	1.5 km	MPC · JPL
804011	2015 TK_{419}	—	October 10, 2015	Haleakala	Pan-STARRS 1	·	1.2 km	MPC · JPL
804012	2015 TF_{421}	—	October 10, 2015	Haleakala	Pan-STARRS 1	(1547)	1.0 km	MPC · JPL
804013	2015 TZ_{427}	—	October 10, 2015	Haleakala	Pan-STARRS 1	·	2.2 km	MPC · JPL
804014	2015 TP_{428}	—	October 13, 2015	Haleakala	Pan-STARRS 1	(194)	740 m	MPC · JPL
804015	2015 TU_{429}	—	October 9, 2015	Haleakala	Pan-STARRS 1	EOS	1.5 km	MPC · JPL
804016	2015 TR_{430}	—	October 10, 2015	Haleakala	Pan-STARRS 1	EOS	1.3 km	MPC · JPL
804017	2015 TS_{431}	—	October 10, 2015	Haleakala	Pan-STARRS 1	·	820 m	MPC · JPL
804018	2015 TW_{432}	—	October 9, 2015	Haleakala	Pan-STARRS 1	·	1.8 km	MPC · JPL
804019	2015 TC_{433}	—	October 12, 2015	Haleakala	Pan-STARRS 1	EOS	1.3 km	MPC · JPL
804020	2015 TB_{443}	—	October 10, 2015	Haleakala	Pan-STARRS 1	·	1.1 km	MPC · JPL
804021	2015 TH_{443}	—	October 8, 2015	Haleakala	Pan-STARRS 1	·	750 m	MPC · JPL
804022	2015 TW_{443}	—	October 10, 2015	Haleakala	Pan-STARRS 1	·	1.4 km	MPC · JPL
804023	2015 TC_{447}	—	October 2, 2015	Mount Lemmon	Mount Lemmon Survey	·	1.4 km	MPC · JPL
804024	2015 TE_{447}	—	October 9, 2015	Haleakala	Pan-STARRS 1	·	2.6 km	MPC · JPL
804025	2015 TW_{447}	—	October 5, 2015	Haleakala	Pan-STARRS 1	(895)	2.2 km	MPC · JPL
804026	2015 TR_{448}	—	October 2, 2015	Mount Lemmon	Mount Lemmon Survey	·	2.2 km	MPC · JPL
804027	2015 TU_{448}	—	October 11, 2015	Mount Lemmon	Mount Lemmon Survey	·	2.5 km	MPC · JPL
804028	2015 TA_{451}	—	October 10, 2015	Haleakala	Pan-STARRS 1	·	1.4 km	MPC · JPL
804029	2015 TB_{451}	—	October 10, 2015	ESA OGS	ESA OGS	·	2.1 km	MPC · JPL
804030	2015 TF_{451}	—	October 10, 2015	Haleakala	Pan-STARRS 1	EOS	1.4 km	MPC · JPL
804031	2015 TG_{451}	—	October 5, 2015	Haleakala	Pan-STARRS 1	·	2.8 km	MPC · JPL
804032	2015 TK_{451}	—	October 15, 2015	Mount Lemmon	Mount Lemmon Survey	·	800 m	MPC · JPL
804033	2015 TH_{455}	—	October 9, 2015	Haleakala	Pan-STARRS 1	MAR	620 m	MPC · JPL
804034	2015 TS_{457}	—	January 30, 2012	Kitt Peak	Spacewatch	·	2.3 km	MPC · JPL
804035	2015 TK_{459}	—	October 10, 2015	Haleakala	Pan-STARRS 1	·	2.0 km	MPC · JPL
804036	2015 TC_{460}	—	October 15, 2015	Haleakala	Pan-STARRS 1	·	940 m	MPC · JPL
804037	2015 TG_{462}	—	October 9, 2015	Kitt Peak	Spacewatch	·	2.4 km	MPC · JPL
804038	2015 TJ_{462}	—	October 13, 2015	Haleakala	Pan-STARRS 1	·	2.8 km	MPC · JPL
804039	2015 TM_{463}	—	October 10, 2015	Haleakala	Pan-STARRS 1	·	1.6 km	MPC · JPL
804040	2015 TC_{467}	—	October 9, 2015	Mount Lemmon	Mount Lemmon Survey	KOR	970 m	MPC · JPL
804041	2015 TW_{467}	—	October 9, 2015	Mount Lemmon	Mount Lemmon Survey	·	1.3 km	MPC · JPL
804042	2015 TY_{479}	—	October 9, 2015	Haleakala	Pan-STARRS 1	·	1.5 km	MPC · JPL
804043	2015 TY_{480}	—	October 13, 2015	Mount Lemmon	Mount Lemmon Survey	(5)	700 m	MPC · JPL
804044	2015 TZ_{480}	—	October 15, 2015	Haleakala	Pan-STARRS 1	·	920 m	MPC · JPL
804045	2015 TH_{481}	—	October 15, 2015	Haleakala	Pan-STARRS 1	·	840 m	MPC · JPL
804046	2015 TC_{482}	—	October 11, 2015	Mount Lemmon	Mount Lemmon Survey	·	1.0 km	MPC · JPL
804047	2015 TF_{484}	—	October 26, 2011	Haleakala	Pan-STARRS 1	·	1.1 km	MPC · JPL
804048	2015 TA_{487}	—	October 10, 2015	Haleakala	Pan-STARRS 1	·	2.4 km	MPC · JPL
804049	2015 TO_{491}	—	October 8, 2015	Haleakala	Pan-STARRS 1	·	820 m	MPC · JPL
804050	2015 TK_{494}	—	October 9, 2015	Haleakala	Pan-STARRS 1	·	1.3 km	MPC · JPL
804051	2015 TV_{496}	—	October 10, 2015	Haleakala	Pan-STARRS 1	·	1.2 km	MPC · JPL
804052	2015 UO_{1}	—	June 20, 2010	Mount Lemmon	Mount Lemmon Survey	·	1.3 km	MPC · JPL
804053	2015 UK_{5}	—	April 10, 2013	Haleakala	Pan-STARRS 1	·	1.3 km	MPC · JPL
804054	2015 UG_{15}	—	October 10, 2010	Mount Lemmon	Mount Lemmon Survey	KOR	1.1 km	MPC · JPL
804055	2015 UF_{20}	—	November 1, 2010	Mount Lemmon	Mount Lemmon Survey	·	1.4 km	MPC · JPL
804056	2015 UU_{25}	—	November 11, 2010	Mount Lemmon	Mount Lemmon Survey	·	1.8 km	MPC · JPL
804057	2015 UO_{29}	—	October 18, 2015	Haleakala	Pan-STARRS 1	·	1.1 km	MPC · JPL
804058	2015 UQ_{30}	—	September 3, 2010	Mount Lemmon	Mount Lemmon Survey	·	1.1 km	MPC · JPL
804059	2015 UA_{40}	—	October 18, 2015	Haleakala	Pan-STARRS 1	·	1.2 km	MPC · JPL
804060	2015 US_{41}	—	September 9, 2015	Haleakala	Pan-STARRS 1	·	760 m	MPC · JPL
804061	2015 UW_{46}	—	September 12, 2015	Haleakala	Pan-STARRS 1	(1547)	840 m	MPC · JPL
804062	2015 UH_{47}	—	August 12, 2015	Haleakala	Pan-STARRS 1	·	1.4 km	MPC · JPL
804063	2015 UX_{50}	—	October 8, 2015	Haleakala	Pan-STARRS 1	·	1.3 km	MPC · JPL
804064	2015 UT_{54}	—	October 2, 2015	Mount Lemmon	Mount Lemmon Survey	·	2.7 km	MPC · JPL
804065	2015 UD_{58}	—	May 13, 2004	Kitt Peak	Spacewatch	·	1.0 km	MPC · JPL
804066	2015 UN_{59}	—	October 19, 2015	Haleakala	Pan-STARRS 1	·	2.4 km	MPC · JPL
804067	2015 UR_{61}	—	September 25, 1998	Kitt Peak	Spacewatch	·	2.2 km	MPC · JPL
804068	2015 UO_{63}	—	October 21, 2015	Haleakala	Pan-STARRS 1	·	1.2 km	MPC · JPL
804069	2015 UJ_{64}	—	September 12, 2015	Haleakala	Pan-STARRS 1	·	2.6 km	MPC · JPL
804070	2015 UV_{64}	—	October 21, 2015	Haleakala	Pan-STARRS 1	·	930 m	MPC · JPL
804071	2015 UA_{76}	—	October 24, 2015	Haleakala	Pan-STARRS 1	·	1.1 km	MPC · JPL
804072	2015 UD_{80}	—	October 24, 2015	Haleakala	Pan-STARRS 1	·	930 m	MPC · JPL
804073	2015 UO_{84}	—	May 6, 2014	Haleakala	Pan-STARRS 1	H	520 m	MPC · JPL
804074	2015 UG_{87}	—	January 1, 2012	Mount Lemmon	Mount Lemmon Survey	·	930 m	MPC · JPL
804075	2015 UP_{88}	—	October 19, 2015	Haleakala	Pan-STARRS 1	EUN	750 m	MPC · JPL
804076	2015 US_{89}	—	October 3, 2006	Kitt Peak	Spacewatch	·	1.3 km	MPC · JPL
804077	2015 UH_{91}	—	October 24, 2015	Mount Lemmon	Mount Lemmon Survey	·	890 m	MPC · JPL
804078	2015 UT_{91}	—	October 11, 2015	Mount Lemmon	Mount Lemmon Survey	·	760 m	MPC · JPL
804079	2015 UP_{93}	—	October 31, 2015	Mount Lemmon	Mount Lemmon Survey	EUN	820 m	MPC · JPL
804080	2015 UJ_{97}	—	October 19, 2015	Haleakala	Pan-STARRS 1	·	1.3 km	MPC · JPL
804081	2015 UV_{97}	—	March 17, 2004	Kitt Peak	Spacewatch	·	830 m	MPC · JPL
804082	2015 UU_{101}	—	October 23, 2015	Haleakala	Pan-STARRS 1	·	1.3 km	MPC · JPL
804083	2015 UW_{101}	—	October 16, 2015	Mount Lemmon	Mount Lemmon Survey	·	1.6 km	MPC · JPL
804084	2015 UZ_{104}	—	October 19, 2015	Haleakala	Pan-STARRS 1	·	1.4 km	MPC · JPL
804085	2015 UC_{108}	—	October 16, 2015	Mount Lemmon	Mount Lemmon Survey	·	2.2 km	MPC · JPL
804086	2015 UT_{108}	—	October 24, 2015	Mount Lemmon	Mount Lemmon Survey	·	1.6 km	MPC · JPL
804087	2015 UX_{108}	—	October 21, 2015	Haleakala	Pan-STARRS 1	·	1.7 km	MPC · JPL
804088	2015 VD	—	November 5, 2007	Kitt Peak	Spacewatch	H	530 m	MPC · JPL
804089	2015 VQ_{2}	—	October 6, 2002	Haleakala	NEAT	·	1.5 km	MPC · JPL
804090	2015 VM_{3}	—	October 10, 2015	Catalina	CSS	·	1.2 km	MPC · JPL
804091	2015 VX_{3}	—	October 10, 2015	Haleakala	Pan-STARRS 1	H	510 m	MPC · JPL
804092	2015 VA_{5}	—	March 11, 2004	Palomar Mountain	NEAT	·	1.2 km	MPC · JPL
804093	2015 VY_{5}	—	June 14, 2004	Kitt Peak	Spacewatch	·	720 m	MPC · JPL
804094	2015 VL_{8}	—	September 6, 2015	Haleakala	Pan-STARRS 1	·	810 m	MPC · JPL
804095	2015 VV_{8}	—	October 12, 2015	Haleakala	Pan-STARRS 1	·	910 m	MPC · JPL
804096	2015 VL_{10}	—	November 21, 2008	Mount Lemmon	Mount Lemmon Survey	NYS	760 m	MPC · JPL
804097	2015 VN_{15}	—	October 2, 2015	Kitt Peak	Spacewatch	AGN	860 m	MPC · JPL
804098	2015 VB_{19}	—	September 12, 2015	Haleakala	Pan-STARRS 1	·	1.0 km	MPC · JPL
804099	2015 VO_{20}	—	July 25, 2015	Haleakala	Pan-STARRS 1	LUT	2.8 km	MPC · JPL
804100	2015 VN_{25}	—	November 1, 2015	Mount Lemmon	Mount Lemmon Survey	·	1.4 km	MPC · JPL

== 804101–804200 ==
back to top

Designation			Discovery			Properties		Ref
Permanent	Provisional	Named after	Date	Site	Discoverer(s)	Category	Diam.	Ref
804101	2015 VU_{25}	—	October 13, 2015	Haleakala	Pan-STARRS 1	JUN	680 m	MPC · JPL
804102	2015 VC_{36}	—	August 23, 2011	Haleakala	Pan-STARRS 1	MAS	620 m	MPC · JPL
804103	2015 VM_{38}	—	August 16, 2006	Palomar Mountain	NEAT	·	1.3 km	MPC · JPL
804104	2015 VH_{49}	—	November 2, 2015	Haleakala	Pan-STARRS 1	H	440 m	MPC · JPL
804105	2015 VQ_{50}	—	June 25, 2015	Haleakala	Pan-STARRS 1	·	1.9 km	MPC · JPL
804106	2015 VX_{50}	—	December 2, 2005	Kitt Peak	Spacewatch	·	2.2 km	MPC · JPL
804107	2015 VC_{56}	—	March 5, 2006	Mount Lemmon	Mount Lemmon Survey	H	520 m	MPC · JPL
804108	2015 VD_{56}	—	May 5, 2008	Mount Lemmon	Mount Lemmon Survey	·	2.4 km	MPC · JPL
804109	2015 VS_{57}	—	March 19, 2013	Haleakala	Pan-STARRS 1	·	750 m	MPC · JPL
804110	2015 VP_{62}	—	October 13, 2015	Mount Lemmon	Mount Lemmon Survey	·	1.2 km	MPC · JPL
804111	2015 VL_{66}	—	January 31, 2003	Socorro	LINEAR	·	1.0 km	MPC · JPL
804112	2015 VF_{67}	—	November 8, 2007	Mount Lemmon	Mount Lemmon Survey	H	440 m	MPC · JPL
804113	2015 VD_{74}	—	September 17, 2006	Kitt Peak	Spacewatch	·	1.3 km	MPC · JPL
804114	2015 VO_{74}	—	October 11, 2015	Mount Lemmon	Mount Lemmon Survey	·	1.1 km	MPC · JPL
804115	2015 VV_{75}	—	October 13, 2015	Catalina	CSS	H	460 m	MPC · JPL
804116	2015 VE_{77}	—	November 2, 2015	Mount Lemmon	Mount Lemmon Survey	·	1.2 km	MPC · JPL
804117	2015 VL_{87}	—	November 6, 2015	Haleakala	Pan-STARRS 1	·	1.1 km	MPC · JPL
804118	2015 VH_{99}	—	May 21, 2014	Haleakala	Pan-STARRS 1	·	750 m	MPC · JPL
804119	2015 VV_{99}	—	October 10, 2015	Haleakala	Pan-STARRS 1	·	1.2 km	MPC · JPL
804120	2015 VW_{100}	—	October 26, 2011	Haleakala	Pan-STARRS 1	·	820 m	MPC · JPL
804121	2015 VD_{109}	—	September 23, 2015	Haleakala	Pan-STARRS 1	·	1.0 km	MPC · JPL
804122	2015 VZ_{119}	—	November 3, 2015	Mount Lemmon	Mount Lemmon Survey	·	1.3 km	MPC · JPL
804123	2015 VE_{125}	—	December 9, 2010	Mount Lemmon	Mount Lemmon Survey	T_{j} (2.98)	2.6 km	MPC · JPL
804124	2015 VJ_{126}	—	December 14, 2004	Campo Imperatore	CINEOS	T_{j} (2.95)	2.5 km	MPC · JPL
804125	2015 VS_{126}	—	September 21, 2011	Mount Lemmon	Mount Lemmon Survey	·	950 m	MPC · JPL
804126	2015 VE_{135}	—	November 8, 2015	Space Surveillance	Space Surveillance Telescope	JUN	780 m	MPC · JPL
804127	2015 VY_{138}	—	June 25, 2011	Mount Lemmon	Mount Lemmon Survey	·	840 m	MPC · JPL
804128	2015 VZ_{144}	—	April 21, 2009	Kitt Peak	Spacewatch	·	1.2 km	MPC · JPL
804129	2015 VS_{146}	—	September 12, 2015	Haleakala	Pan-STARRS 1	·	1.0 km	MPC · JPL
804130	2015 VN_{153}	—	October 16, 2015	Mount Lemmon	Mount Lemmon Survey	H	460 m	MPC · JPL
804131	2015 VG_{155}	—	November 15, 2015	Haleakala	Pan-STARRS 1	·	1.3 km	MPC · JPL
804132	2015 VK_{155}	—	November 7, 2015	Mount Lemmon	Mount Lemmon Survey	·	900 m	MPC · JPL
804133	2015 VA_{162}	—	October 17, 2010	Mount Lemmon	Mount Lemmon Survey	·	1.3 km	MPC · JPL
804134	2015 VP_{162}	—	July 31, 2014	Haleakala	Pan-STARRS 1	·	1.4 km	MPC · JPL
804135	2015 VC_{174}	—	November 13, 2015	Mount Lemmon	Mount Lemmon Survey	EUN	820 m	MPC · JPL
804136	2015 VQ_{174}	—	November 1, 2015	Mount Lemmon	Mount Lemmon Survey	·	1.3 km	MPC · JPL
804137	2015 VG_{176}	—	November 13, 2015	Mount Lemmon	Mount Lemmon Survey	·	1.0 km	MPC · JPL
804138	2015 VM_{177}	—	November 14, 2015	Mount Lemmon	Mount Lemmon Survey	·	820 m	MPC · JPL
804139	2015 VQ_{177}	—	November 12, 2015	Mount Lemmon	Mount Lemmon Survey	(5)	860 m	MPC · JPL
804140	2015 VE_{179}	—	November 12, 2015	Mount Lemmon	Mount Lemmon Survey	·	950 m	MPC · JPL
804141	2015 VY_{179}	—	November 12, 2015	Piszkéstető	K. Sárneczky	EUN	790 m	MPC · JPL
804142	2015 VE_{180}	—	November 6, 2015	Mount Lemmon	Mount Lemmon Survey	EUN	900 m	MPC · JPL
804143	2015 VA_{181}	—	November 1, 2015	Kitt Peak	Spacewatch	·	1.0 km	MPC · JPL
804144	2015 VY_{182}	—	November 9, 2015	Mount Lemmon	Mount Lemmon Survey	·	760 m	MPC · JPL
804145	2015 VZ_{185}	—	November 13, 2015	Kitt Peak	Spacewatch	·	1.1 km	MPC · JPL
804146	2015 VE_{186}	—	November 8, 2015	Mount Lemmon	Mount Lemmon Survey	·	1.1 km	MPC · JPL
804147	2015 VF_{186}	—	October 30, 2011	Mount Lemmon	Mount Lemmon Survey	EUN	650 m	MPC · JPL
804148	2015 VO_{187}	—	November 8, 2015	Mount Lemmon	Mount Lemmon Survey	·	780 m	MPC · JPL
804149	2015 VH_{192}	—	November 3, 2015	Mount Lemmon	Mount Lemmon Survey	HOF	2.0 km	MPC · JPL
804150	2015 VK_{194}	—	October 26, 2011	Haleakala	Pan-STARRS 1	(5)	770 m	MPC · JPL
804151	2015 VB_{196}	—	November 13, 2015	Mount Lemmon	Mount Lemmon Survey	·	730 m	MPC · JPL
804152	2015 VF_{196}	—	November 2, 2015	Haleakala	Pan-STARRS 1	EOS	1.5 km	MPC · JPL
804153	2015 VT_{196}	—	November 7, 2015	Mount Lemmon	Mount Lemmon Survey	·	1.4 km	MPC · JPL
804154	2015 VG_{197}	—	November 1, 2015	Mount Lemmon	Mount Lemmon Survey	EOS	1.3 km	MPC · JPL
804155	2015 VS_{197}	—	November 7, 2015	Mount Lemmon	Mount Lemmon Survey	·	1.7 km	MPC · JPL
804156	2015 VA_{201}	—	November 13, 2015	Mount Lemmon	Mount Lemmon Survey	·	2.6 km	MPC · JPL
804157	2015 VW_{203}	—	March 16, 2012	Haleakala	Pan-STARRS 1	·	760 m	MPC · JPL
804158	2015 VK_{206}	—	November 2, 2015	Mount Lemmon	Mount Lemmon Survey	·	850 m	MPC · JPL
804159	2015 VB_{209}	—	November 7, 2015	Mount Lemmon	Mount Lemmon Survey	·	850 m	MPC · JPL
804160	2015 VW_{210}	—	November 14, 2015	Mount Lemmon	Mount Lemmon Survey	·	1.8 km	MPC · JPL
804161	2015 VQ_{211}	—	November 3, 2015	Mount Lemmon	Mount Lemmon Survey	·	1.8 km	MPC · JPL
804162	2015 VU_{216}	—	November 12, 2015	Mount Lemmon	Mount Lemmon Survey	·	1.9 km	MPC · JPL
804163	2015 VL_{217}	—	November 8, 2015	Mount Lemmon	Mount Lemmon Survey	WIT	650 m	MPC · JPL
804164	2015 VX_{217}	—	November 13, 2015	Mount Lemmon	Mount Lemmon Survey	·	990 m	MPC · JPL
804165	2015 VS_{218}	—	November 7, 2015	Mount Lemmon	Mount Lemmon Survey	·	880 m	MPC · JPL
804166	2015 WA	—	April 27, 2006	Kitt Peak	Spacewatch	H	430 m	MPC · JPL
804167	2015 WX	—	October 10, 2015	Haleakala	Pan-STARRS 1	·	940 m	MPC · JPL
804168	2015 WG_{1}	—	May 5, 2014	Haleakala	Pan-STARRS 1	H	460 m	MPC · JPL
804169	2015 WD_{4}	—	November 13, 2015	Kitt Peak	Spacewatch	·	790 m	MPC · JPL
804170	2015 WF_{6}	—	November 14, 2015	Mount Lemmon	Mount Lemmon Survey	·	830 m	MPC · JPL
804171	2015 WA_{8}	—	November 3, 2015	Mount Lemmon	Mount Lemmon Survey	·	1.0 km	MPC · JPL
804172	2015 WX_{12}	—	November 30, 2015	Haleakala	Pan-STARRS 1	·	1.1 km	MPC · JPL
804173	2015 WR_{15}	—	November 8, 2015	Catalina	CSS	·	1.3 km	MPC · JPL
804174	2015 WV_{17}	—	November 22, 2015	Mount Lemmon	Mount Lemmon Survey	·	2.0 km	MPC · JPL
804175	2015 WD_{18}	—	November 21, 2015	Mount Lemmon	Mount Lemmon Survey	·	1.2 km	MPC · JPL
804176	2015 WL_{18}	—	October 10, 2015	Haleakala	Pan-STARRS 1	·	1.1 km	MPC · JPL
804177	2015 WA_{20}	—	April 10, 2013	Haleakala	Pan-STARRS 1	·	2.8 km	MPC · JPL
804178	2015 WL_{21}	—	November 22, 2015	Mount Lemmon	Mount Lemmon Survey	KOR	950 m	MPC · JPL
804179	2015 WF_{23}	—	November 21, 2015	Mount Lemmon	Mount Lemmon Survey	·	940 m	MPC · JPL
804180	2015 WJ_{23}	—	November 21, 2015	Mount Lemmon	Mount Lemmon Survey	·	970 m	MPC · JPL
804181	2015 WQ_{23}	—	November 16, 2015	Haleakala	Pan-STARRS 1	·	950 m	MPC · JPL
804182	2015 WH_{28}	—	November 24, 2015	Mount Lemmon	Mount Lemmon Survey	·	860 m	MPC · JPL
804183	2015 WL_{28}	—	November 18, 2015	Haleakala	Pan-STARRS 1	·	1.0 km	MPC · JPL
804184	2015 WC_{29}	—	November 22, 2015	Mount Lemmon	Mount Lemmon Survey	(5)	830 m	MPC · JPL
804185	2015 WH_{29}	—	November 16, 2015	Haleakala	Pan-STARRS 1	(194)	1.3 km	MPC · JPL
804186	2015 WD_{30}	—	November 17, 2015	Haleakala	Pan-STARRS 1	·	1.8 km	MPC · JPL
804187	2015 WM_{32}	—	November 22, 2015	Mount Lemmon	Mount Lemmon Survey	·	2.1 km	MPC · JPL
804188	2015 WG_{34}	—	November 17, 2015	Haleakala	Pan-STARRS 1	TIN	790 m	MPC · JPL
804189	2015 WO_{34}	—	November 17, 2015	Haleakala	Pan-STARRS 1	·	810 m	MPC · JPL
804190	2015 WA_{35}	—	September 19, 1998	Sacramento Peak	SDSS	·	2.5 km	MPC · JPL
804191	2015 WJ_{35}	—	November 21, 2015	Mount Lemmon	Mount Lemmon Survey	·	800 m	MPC · JPL
804192	2015 WW_{36}	—	November 22, 2015	Mount Lemmon	Mount Lemmon Survey	·	2.7 km	MPC · JPL
804193	2015 WP_{38}	—	November 22, 2015	Mount Lemmon	Mount Lemmon Survey	·	1.2 km	MPC · JPL
804194	2015 WR_{38}	—	August 3, 2014	Haleakala	Pan-STARRS 1	KOR	920 m	MPC · JPL
804195	2015 WL_{41}	—	November 19, 2015	Mount Lemmon	Mount Lemmon Survey	·	2.3 km	MPC · JPL
804196	2015 XS	—	September 23, 2015	Haleakala	Pan-STARRS 1	·	1.2 km	MPC · JPL
804197	2015 XM_{6}	—	November 17, 2015	Haleakala	Pan-STARRS 1	·	1.3 km	MPC · JPL
804198	2015 XZ_{7}	—	December 1, 2015	Haleakala	Pan-STARRS 1	·	790 m	MPC · JPL
804199	2015 XU_{15}	—	December 2, 2015	Haleakala	Pan-STARRS 1	·	1.5 km	MPC · JPL
804200	2015 XC_{21}	—	November 7, 2015	Haleakala	Pan-STARRS 1	·	1.4 km	MPC · JPL

== 804201–804300 ==
back to top

Designation			Discovery			Properties		Ref
Permanent	Provisional	Named after	Date	Site	Discoverer(s)	Category	Diam.	Ref
804201	2015 XS_{22}	—	February 12, 2008	Kitt Peak	Spacewatch	·	710 m	MPC · JPL
804202	2015 XW_{28}	—	July 29, 2014	Haleakala	Pan-STARRS 1	·	810 m	MPC · JPL
804203	2015 XL_{30}	—	December 2, 2015	Haleakala	Pan-STARRS 1	HNS	650 m	MPC · JPL
804204	2015 XZ_{33}	—	October 8, 2015	Haleakala	Pan-STARRS 1	·	2.2 km	MPC · JPL
804205	2015 XV_{34}	—	December 2, 2015	Haleakala	Pan-STARRS 1	·	1.2 km	MPC · JPL
804206	2015 XL_{46}	—	October 10, 2015	Haleakala	Pan-STARRS 1	·	1.2 km	MPC · JPL
804207	2015 XV_{52}	—	October 8, 2015	Haleakala	Pan-STARRS 1	·	1.1 km	MPC · JPL
804208	2015 XE_{54}	—	December 2, 2015	Haleakala	Pan-STARRS 1	·	820 m	MPC · JPL
804209	2015 XX_{57}	—	December 1, 2015	Haleakala	Pan-STARRS 1	·	1.0 km	MPC · JPL
804210	2015 XT_{58}	—	May 13, 2012	Mount Lemmon	Mount Lemmon Survey	·	3.2 km	MPC · JPL
804211	2015 XO_{61}	—	December 1, 2015	Haleakala	Pan-STARRS 1	·	850 m	MPC · JPL
804212	2015 XJ_{69}	—	September 19, 2015	Haleakala	Pan-STARRS 1	·	700 m	MPC · JPL
804213	2015 XF_{71}	—	October 10, 2015	Haleakala	Pan-STARRS 1	·	750 m	MPC · JPL
804214	2015 XG_{72}	—	November 27, 2010	Mount Lemmon	Mount Lemmon Survey	·	2.2 km	MPC · JPL
804215	2015 XG_{81}	—	December 3, 2015	Haleakala	Pan-STARRS 1	·	1.1 km	MPC · JPL
804216	2015 XY_{86}	—	December 3, 2015	Haleakala	Pan-STARRS 1	KON	2.0 km	MPC · JPL
804217	2015 XY_{87}	—	February 3, 2012	Mount Lemmon	Mount Lemmon Survey	·	970 m	MPC · JPL
804218	2015 XJ_{88}	—	December 3, 2015	Haleakala	Pan-STARRS 1	·	1.1 km	MPC · JPL
804219	2015 XP_{94}	—	December 4, 2015	Haleakala	Pan-STARRS 1	·	970 m	MPC · JPL
804220	2015 XR_{99}	—	October 8, 2015	Mount Lemmon	Mount Lemmon Survey	·	990 m	MPC · JPL
804221	2015 XS_{102}	—	December 4, 2015	Haleakala	Pan-STARRS 1	·	940 m	MPC · JPL
804222	2015 XB_{103}	—	January 13, 2008	Kitt Peak	Spacewatch	(5)	810 m	MPC · JPL
804223	2015 XM_{105}	—	January 1, 2008	Kitt Peak	Spacewatch	·	860 m	MPC · JPL
804224	2015 XC_{112}	—	September 19, 2014	Haleakala	Pan-STARRS 1	·	1.9 km	MPC · JPL
804225	2015 XN_{112}	—	December 4, 2015	Haleakala	Pan-STARRS 1	·	1.2 km	MPC · JPL
804226	2015 XT_{112}	—	October 12, 2010	Mount Lemmon	Mount Lemmon Survey	·	1.4 km	MPC · JPL
804227	2015 XX_{113}	—	October 8, 2005	Kitt Peak	Spacewatch	·	1.3 km	MPC · JPL
804228	2015 XP_{114}	—	December 4, 2015	Haleakala	Pan-STARRS 1	·	1.2 km	MPC · JPL
804229	2015 XE_{115}	—	February 27, 2006	Mount Lemmon	Mount Lemmon Survey	·	2.3 km	MPC · JPL
804230	2015 XW_{116}	—	December 4, 2015	Haleakala	Pan-STARRS 1	·	1.4 km	MPC · JPL
804231	2015 XE_{117}	—	August 20, 2014	Haleakala	Pan-STARRS 1	EOS	1.3 km	MPC · JPL
804232	2015 XV_{118}	—	October 9, 2015	Haleakala	Pan-STARRS 1	ELF	2.6 km	MPC · JPL
804233	2015 XW_{118}	—	December 4, 2015	Haleakala	Pan-STARRS 1	ADE	1.1 km	MPC · JPL
804234	2015 XC_{119}	—	December 4, 2015	Haleakala	Pan-STARRS 1	·	910 m	MPC · JPL
804235	2015 XP_{119}	—	December 4, 2015	Haleakala	Pan-STARRS 1	·	900 m	MPC · JPL
804236	2015 XC_{120}	—	December 4, 2015	Haleakala	Pan-STARRS 1	·	910 m	MPC · JPL
804237	2015 XT_{123}	—	March 10, 2008	Mount Lemmon	Mount Lemmon Survey	·	1.0 km	MPC · JPL
804238	2015 XK_{124}	—	December 4, 2015	Haleakala	Pan-STARRS 1	·	680 m	MPC · JPL
804239	2015 XB_{127}	—	December 4, 2015	Haleakala	Pan-STARRS 1	·	850 m	MPC · JPL
804240	2015 XZ_{133}	—	December 4, 2015	Mount Lemmon	Mount Lemmon Survey	·	740 m	MPC · JPL
804241	2015 XV_{141}	—	May 12, 2013	Mount Lemmon	Mount Lemmon Survey	·	1.9 km	MPC · JPL
804242	2015 XA_{144}	—	July 6, 2014	Haleakala	Pan-STARRS 1	EOS	1.7 km	MPC · JPL
804243	2015 XZ_{145}	—	November 9, 2015	Mount Lemmon	Mount Lemmon Survey	·	1.1 km	MPC · JPL
804244	2015 XA_{147}	—	December 4, 2015	Mount Lemmon	Mount Lemmon Survey	·	1.2 km	MPC · JPL
804245	2015 XU_{147}	—	May 3, 2014	Mount Lemmon	Mount Lemmon Survey	·	850 m	MPC · JPL
804246	2015 XK_{150}	—	November 6, 2015	Mount Lemmon	Mount Lemmon Survey	·	890 m	MPC · JPL
804247	2015 XE_{152}	—	December 4, 2015	Haleakala	Pan-STARRS 1	·	1.1 km	MPC · JPL
804248	2015 XU_{152}	—	December 4, 2015	Haleakala	Pan-STARRS 1	·	1.2 km	MPC · JPL
804249	2015 XF_{153}	—	December 4, 2015	Haleakala	Pan-STARRS 1	JUN	580 m	MPC · JPL
804250	2015 XN_{155}	—	November 20, 2015	Mount Lemmon	Mount Lemmon Survey	·	990 m	MPC · JPL
804251	2015 XF_{164}	—	September 14, 2012	Mount Lemmon	Mount Lemmon Survey	H	460 m	MPC · JPL
804252	2015 XB_{165}	—	June 27, 2014	Haleakala	Pan-STARRS 1	·	2.4 km	MPC · JPL
804253	2015 XD_{166}	—	October 14, 2015	Haleakala	Pan-STARRS 1	·	1.1 km	MPC · JPL
804254	2015 XT_{166}	—	November 22, 2015	Mount Lemmon	Mount Lemmon Survey	·	2.1 km	MPC · JPL
804255	2015 XY_{170}	—	December 4, 2015	Mount Lemmon	Mount Lemmon Survey	EUN	770 m	MPC · JPL
804256	2015 XD_{171}	—	July 12, 2001	Palomar Mountain	NEAT	·	1.6 km	MPC · JPL
804257	2015 XJ_{173}	—	August 21, 2014	Haleakala	Pan-STARRS 1	EOS	1.2 km	MPC · JPL
804258	2015 XL_{175}	—	December 5, 2015	Haleakala	Pan-STARRS 1	(18466)	1.6 km	MPC · JPL
804259	2015 XT_{175}	—	August 3, 2014	Haleakala	Pan-STARRS 1	·	1.7 km	MPC · JPL
804260	2015 XV_{176}	—	October 28, 2005	Mount Lemmon	Mount Lemmon Survey	·	1.5 km	MPC · JPL
804261	2015 XQ_{182}	—	December 5, 2015	Haleakala	Pan-STARRS 1	·	840 m	MPC · JPL
804262	2015 XO_{184}	—	March 16, 2012	Mount Lemmon	Mount Lemmon Survey	·	1.8 km	MPC · JPL
804263	2015 XH_{187}	—	December 5, 2015	Haleakala	Pan-STARRS 1	·	820 m	MPC · JPL
804264	2015 XP_{190}	—	September 10, 2015	Haleakala	Pan-STARRS 1	·	850 m	MPC · JPL
804265	2015 XC_{193}	—	July 30, 2014	Haleakala	Pan-STARRS 1	HOF	1.8 km	MPC · JPL
804266	2015 XR_{193}	—	October 21, 2006	Mount Lemmon	Mount Lemmon Survey	·	1.0 km	MPC · JPL
804267	2015 XH_{197}	—	March 6, 2008	Mount Lemmon	Mount Lemmon Survey	·	810 m	MPC · JPL
804268	2015 XY_{201}	—	December 6, 2015	Haleakala	Pan-STARRS 1	EOS	1.2 km	MPC · JPL
804269	2015 XH_{206}	—	September 5, 2010	Mount Lemmon	Mount Lemmon Survey	EUN	760 m	MPC · JPL
804270	2015 XU_{207}	—	December 1, 2015	Heaven on Earth Ob	W. K. Y. Yeung	EUN	880 m	MPC · JPL
804271	2015 XL_{214}	—	July 25, 2014	Haleakala	Pan-STARRS 1	·	1.2 km	MPC · JPL
804272	2015 XO_{215}	—	December 3, 2015	Mount Lemmon	Mount Lemmon Survey	·	820 m	MPC · JPL
804273	2015 XO_{218}	—	December 4, 2015	Mount Lemmon	Mount Lemmon Survey	·	1.0 km	MPC · JPL
804274	2015 XS_{218}	—	December 4, 2015	Mount Lemmon	Mount Lemmon Survey	AGN	820 m	MPC · JPL
804275	2015 XN_{225}	—	December 6, 2015	Haleakala	Pan-STARRS 1	·	670 m	MPC · JPL
804276	2015 XU_{228}	—	December 6, 2015	Haleakala	Pan-STARRS 1	·	660 m	MPC · JPL
804277	2015 XG_{229}	—	March 27, 2008	Mount Lemmon	Mount Lemmon Survey	·	1.1 km	MPC · JPL
804278	2015 XO_{230}	—	September 2, 2014	Haleakala	Pan-STARRS 1	EOS	1.3 km	MPC · JPL
804279	2015 XW_{230}	—	December 6, 2015	Haleakala	Pan-STARRS 1	·	790 m	MPC · JPL
804280	2015 XM_{235}	—	December 6, 2015	Haleakala	Pan-STARRS 1	HNS	1 km	MPC · JPL
804281	2015 XC_{236}	—	December 3, 2015	Mount Lemmon	Mount Lemmon Survey	·	1.2 km	MPC · JPL
804282	2015 XL_{236}	—	December 6, 2015	Haleakala	Pan-STARRS 1	·	890 m	MPC · JPL
804283	2015 XM_{237}	—	December 6, 2015	Haleakala	Pan-STARRS 1	·	1.3 km	MPC · JPL
804284	2015 XF_{245}	—	November 17, 2014	Haleakala	Pan-STARRS 1	·	2.3 km	MPC · JPL
804285	2015 XS_{247}	—	November 15, 2015	Haleakala	Pan-STARRS 1	·	920 m	MPC · JPL
804286	2015 XE_{248}	—	May 16, 2007	Mount Lemmon	Mount Lemmon Survey	·	2.4 km	MPC · JPL
804287	2015 XP_{248}	—	October 10, 2015	Haleakala	Pan-STARRS 1	MAR	670 m	MPC · JPL
804288	2015 XX_{249}	—	February 8, 2008	Mount Lemmon	Mount Lemmon Survey	·	1 km	MPC · JPL
804289	2015 XM_{251}	—	October 25, 2015	Haleakala	Pan-STARRS 1	EUN	770 m	MPC · JPL
804290	2015 XZ_{254}	—	October 8, 2015	Haleakala	Pan-STARRS 1	·	970 m	MPC · JPL
804291	2015 XD_{256}	—	October 10, 2015	Haleakala	Pan-STARRS 1	MAR	700 m	MPC · JPL
804292	2015 XN_{256}	—	December 7, 2015	Haleakala	Pan-STARRS 1	MAR	720 m	MPC · JPL
804293	2015 XO_{259}	—	December 8, 2015	Mount Lemmon	Mount Lemmon Survey	·	1.1 km	MPC · JPL
804294	2015 XZ_{259}	—	November 8, 2015	Haleakala	Pan-STARRS 1	·	2.2 km	MPC · JPL
804295	2015 XT_{260}	—	December 8, 2015	Haleakala	Pan-STARRS 1	·	1.1 km	MPC · JPL
804296	2015 XC_{261}	—	October 21, 2011	Mount Lemmon	Mount Lemmon Survey	·	940 m	MPC · JPL
804297	2015 XL_{264}	—	November 22, 2015	Mount Lemmon	Mount Lemmon Survey	·	1.4 km	MPC · JPL
804298	2015 XT_{264}	—	November 22, 2015	Mount Lemmon	Mount Lemmon Survey	·	860 m	MPC · JPL
804299	2015 XF_{268}	—	September 19, 2015	Haleakala	Pan-STARRS 1	·	990 m	MPC · JPL
804300	2015 XD_{269}	—	March 16, 2012	Haleakala	Pan-STARRS 1	·	1.7 km	MPC · JPL

== 804301–804400 ==
back to top

Designation			Discovery			Properties		Ref
Permanent	Provisional	Named after	Date	Site	Discoverer(s)	Category	Diam.	Ref
804301	2015 XJ_{278}	—	August 23, 2014	Haleakala	Pan-STARRS 1	MRX	730 m	MPC · JPL
804302	2015 XU_{281}	—	November 3, 2010	Mount Lemmon	Mount Lemmon Survey	·	1.3 km	MPC · JPL
804303	2015 XO_{282}	—	September 25, 2009	Kitt Peak	Spacewatch	·	1.8 km	MPC · JPL
804304	2015 XX_{290}	—	December 7, 2015	Haleakala	Pan-STARRS 1	·	1.2 km	MPC · JPL
804305	2015 XJ_{291}	—	December 7, 2015	Haleakala	Pan-STARRS 1	·	670 m	MPC · JPL
804306	2015 XY_{295}	—	December 7, 2015	Haleakala	Pan-STARRS 1	KOR	900 m	MPC · JPL
804307	2015 XY_{297}	—	August 22, 2014	Haleakala	Pan-STARRS 1	·	1.1 km	MPC · JPL
804308	2015 XL_{300}	—	December 7, 2015	Haleakala	Pan-STARRS 1	EOS	1.3 km	MPC · JPL
804309	2015 XG_{308}	—	December 7, 2015	Haleakala	Pan-STARRS 1	·	1 km	MPC · JPL
804310	2015 XJ_{312}	—	October 14, 2015	Mount Lemmon	Mount Lemmon Survey	·	910 m	MPC · JPL
804311	2015 XS_{313}	—	January 1, 2008	Kitt Peak	Spacewatch	·	930 m	MPC · JPL
804312	2015 XQ_{317}	—	December 8, 2015	Haleakala	Pan-STARRS 1	·	980 m	MPC · JPL
804313	2015 XQ_{321}	—	December 6, 2015	Mount Lemmon	Mount Lemmon Survey	EOS	1.3 km	MPC · JPL
804314	2015 XW_{321}	—	August 3, 2014	Haleakala	Pan-STARRS 1	KOR	980 m	MPC · JPL
804315	2015 XD_{334}	—	December 8, 2015	Haleakala	Pan-STARRS 1	(5)	720 m	MPC · JPL
804316	2015 XY_{336}	—	December 8, 2015	Haleakala	Pan-STARRS 1	·	1.3 km	MPC · JPL
804317	2015 XB_{340}	—	December 6, 2015	Haleakala	Pan-STARRS 1	·	950 m	MPC · JPL
804318	2015 XH_{340}	—	December 4, 2015	Mount Lemmon	Mount Lemmon Survey	·	1.6 km	MPC · JPL
804319	2015 XQ_{344}	—	December 8, 2015	Haleakala	Pan-STARRS 1	·	1.2 km	MPC · JPL
804320	2015 XH_{349}	—	December 8, 2015	Haleakala	Pan-STARRS 1	EOS	1.3 km	MPC · JPL
804321	2015 XZ_{349}	—	September 23, 2015	Haleakala	Pan-STARRS 1	EUN	1.0 km	MPC · JPL
804322	2015 XR_{350}	—	December 6, 2015	Mount Lemmon	Mount Lemmon Survey	·	1.5 km	MPC · JPL
804323	2015 XK_{351}	—	December 8, 2015	Haleakala	Pan-STARRS 1	APO · PHA	320 m	MPC · JPL
804324	2015 XM_{351}	—	February 3, 2008	Catalina	CSS	H	490 m	MPC · JPL
804325	2015 XF_{352}	—	December 12, 2015	Haleakala	Pan-STARRS 1	APO	190 m	MPC · JPL
804326	2015 XT_{352}	—	November 10, 2015	Mount Lemmon	Mount Lemmon Survey	·	980 m	MPC · JPL
804327	2015 XN_{354}	—	June 21, 2014	Haleakala	Pan-STARRS 1	·	2.3 km	MPC · JPL
804328	2015 XO_{356}	—	November 7, 2015	Haleakala	Pan-STARRS 1	·	1.0 km	MPC · JPL
804329	2015 XR_{356}	—	September 9, 2015	Haleakala	Pan-STARRS 1	EUN	720 m	MPC · JPL
804330	2015 XO_{357}	—	October 19, 2015	Haleakala	Pan-STARRS 1	·	1.2 km	MPC · JPL
804331	2015 XM_{358}	—	November 17, 2015	Haleakala	Pan-STARRS 1	·	1.2 km	MPC · JPL
804332	2015 XB_{363}	—	December 9, 2015	Mount Lemmon	Mount Lemmon Survey	·	1.1 km	MPC · JPL
804333	2015 XJ_{366}	—	December 12, 2015	Haleakala	Pan-STARRS 1	KON	1.7 km	MPC · JPL
804334	2015 XY_{370}	—	December 6, 2011	Haleakala	Pan-STARRS 1	·	730 m	MPC · JPL
804335	2015 XN_{371}	—	December 6, 2005	Kitt Peak	Spacewatch	·	1.6 km	MPC · JPL
804336	2015 XB_{377}	—	November 16, 2006	Kitt Peak	Spacewatch	·	1.3 km	MPC · JPL
804337	2015 XM_{377}	—	December 9, 2015	Haleakala	Pan-STARRS 1	·	930 m	MPC · JPL
804338	2015 XP_{377}	—	October 8, 2015	Haleakala	Pan-STARRS 1	T_{j} (2.18)	3.3 km	MPC · JPL
804339	2015 XJ_{381}	—	October 8, 2015	Haleakala	Pan-STARRS 1	·	1.8 km	MPC · JPL
804340	2015 XM_{381}	—	October 19, 2015	Haleakala	Pan-STARRS 1	·	1.1 km	MPC · JPL
804341	2015 XR_{381}	—	December 13, 2015	Haleakala	Pan-STARRS 1	·	1.9 km	MPC · JPL
804342	2015 XU_{382}	—	December 8, 2015	Haleakala	Pan-STARRS 1	·	1.7 km	MPC · JPL
804343	2015 XZ_{382}	—	December 14, 2015	Mount Lemmon	Mount Lemmon Survey	·	960 m	MPC · JPL
804344	2015 XH_{386}	—	November 22, 2014	Haleakala	Pan-STARRS 1	L5	6.2 km	MPC · JPL
804345	2015 XW_{388}	—	February 11, 2002	Socorro	LINEAR	H	430 m	MPC · JPL
804346	2015 XO_{389}	—	January 29, 2003	Palomar Mountain	NEAT	·	1.2 km	MPC · JPL
804347	2015 XS_{389}	—	December 4, 2015	Mount Lemmon	Mount Lemmon Survey	·	1.6 km	MPC · JPL
804348	2015 XP_{391}	—	December 9, 2015	Haleakala	Pan-STARRS 1	·	1.1 km	MPC · JPL
804349	2015 XR_{391}	—	December 9, 2015	Haleakala	Pan-STARRS 1	·	1.1 km	MPC · JPL
804350	2015 XY_{391}	—	December 14, 2006	Kitt Peak	Spacewatch	·	1.4 km	MPC · JPL
804351	2015 XM_{396}	—	September 26, 2006	Mount Lemmon	Mount Lemmon Survey	·	1.0 km	MPC · JPL
804352	2015 XP_{396}	—	December 13, 2015	Haleakala	Pan-STARRS 1	·	1.2 km	MPC · JPL
804353	2015 XU_{397}	—	December 4, 2015	Mount Lemmon	Mount Lemmon Survey	·	790 m	MPC · JPL
804354	2015 XW_{399}	—	December 13, 2015	Haleakala	Pan-STARRS 1	·	2.0 km	MPC · JPL
804355	2015 XX_{399}	—	November 17, 2014	Mount Lemmon	Mount Lemmon Survey	·	2.3 km	MPC · JPL
804356	2015 XP_{402}	—	April 15, 2012	Haleakala	Pan-STARRS 1	·	1.4 km	MPC · JPL
804357	2015 XZ_{402}	—	December 7, 2015	Haleakala	Pan-STARRS 1	·	1.1 km	MPC · JPL
804358	2015 XH_{403}	—	August 28, 2014	Haleakala	Pan-STARRS 1	·	2.1 km	MPC · JPL
804359	2015 XT_{405}	—	November 12, 2010	Mount Lemmon	Mount Lemmon Survey	·	1.4 km	MPC · JPL
804360	2015 XG_{407}	—	May 8, 2013	Haleakala	Pan-STARRS 1	·	790 m	MPC · JPL
804361	2015 XH_{407}	—	December 5, 2015	Haleakala	Pan-STARRS 1	(5)	810 m	MPC · JPL
804362	2015 XH_{408}	—	January 25, 2012	Haleakala	Pan-STARRS 1	JUN	510 m	MPC · JPL
804363	2015 XO_{409}	—	March 4, 2012	Mount Lemmon	Mount Lemmon Survey	·	1.1 km	MPC · JPL
804364	2015 XX_{409}	—	November 16, 2006	Kitt Peak	Spacewatch	·	1.2 km	MPC · JPL
804365	2015 XK_{410}	—	March 10, 2011	Kitt Peak	Spacewatch	·	2.2 km	MPC · JPL
804366	2015 XL_{410}	—	October 11, 2010	Mount Lemmon	Mount Lemmon Survey	ADE	1.3 km	MPC · JPL
804367	2015 XC_{412}	—	December 8, 2015	Haleakala	Pan-STARRS 1	·	910 m	MPC · JPL
804368	2015 XF_{412}	—	December 8, 2015	Haleakala	Pan-STARRS 1	KON	1.4 km	MPC · JPL
804369	2015 XU_{412}	—	March 4, 2012	Mount Lemmon	Mount Lemmon Survey	·	1.1 km	MPC · JPL
804370	2015 XA_{413}	—	December 8, 2015	Haleakala	Pan-STARRS 1	·	1.2 km	MPC · JPL
804371	2015 XD_{415}	—	December 9, 2015	Haleakala	Pan-STARRS 1	·	2.0 km	MPC · JPL
804372	2015 XV_{416}	—	December 13, 2015	Haleakala	Pan-STARRS 1	·	870 m	MPC · JPL
804373	2015 XG_{417}	—	December 13, 2015	Haleakala	Pan-STARRS 1	·	820 m	MPC · JPL
804374	2015 XS_{417}	—	October 28, 2014	Haleakala	Pan-STARRS 1	·	1.5 km	MPC · JPL
804375	2015 XL_{418}	—	September 19, 2014	Haleakala	Pan-STARRS 1	·	1.5 km	MPC · JPL
804376	2015 XQ_{418}	—	April 19, 2012	Kitt Peak	Spacewatch	JUN	630 m	MPC · JPL
804377	2015 XE_{419}	—	November 9, 2008	Kitt Peak	Spacewatch	EOS	1.5 km	MPC · JPL
804378	2015 XA_{420}	—	October 21, 2014	Mount Lemmon	Mount Lemmon Survey	ADE	1.5 km	MPC · JPL
804379	2015 XB_{420}	—	December 13, 2015	Haleakala	Pan-STARRS 1	·	1.2 km	MPC · JPL
804380	2015 XM_{420}	—	December 14, 2015	Haleakala	Pan-STARRS 1	EUN	750 m	MPC · JPL
804381	2015 XC_{421}	—	December 14, 2015	Haleakala	Pan-STARRS 1	·	1.9 km	MPC · JPL
804382	2015 XO_{423}	—	December 13, 2015	Haleakala	Pan-STARRS 1	EUN	850 m	MPC · JPL
804383	2015 XU_{423}	—	December 8, 2015	Haleakala	Pan-STARRS 1	·	870 m	MPC · JPL
804384	2015 XK_{426}	—	December 4, 2015	Haleakala	Pan-STARRS 1	JUN	640 m	MPC · JPL
804385	2015 XA_{429}	—	December 5, 2015	Haleakala	Pan-STARRS 1	·	920 m	MPC · JPL
804386	2015 XB_{429}	—	December 6, 2015	Mount Lemmon	Mount Lemmon Survey	·	840 m	MPC · JPL
804387	2015 XC_{429}	—	December 8, 2015	Haleakala	Pan-STARRS 1	·	1.6 km	MPC · JPL
804388	2015 XN_{429}	—	December 8, 2015	Mount Lemmon	Mount Lemmon Survey	·	890 m	MPC · JPL
804389	2015 XX_{429}	—	December 8, 2015	Haleakala	Pan-STARRS 1	·	1.2 km	MPC · JPL
804390	2015 XX_{430}	—	September 26, 2006	Kitt Peak	Spacewatch	·	950 m	MPC · JPL
804391	2015 XA_{431}	—	December 9, 2015	Haleakala	Pan-STARRS 1	·	790 m	MPC · JPL
804392	2015 XS_{431}	—	December 4, 2015	Haleakala	Pan-STARRS 1	·	1.3 km	MPC · JPL
804393	2015 XH_{432}	—	December 13, 2015	Haleakala	Pan-STARRS 1	·	970 m	MPC · JPL
804394	2015 XP_{433}	—	December 8, 2015	Haleakala	Pan-STARRS 1	·	900 m	MPC · JPL
804395	2015 XT_{434}	—	December 6, 2015	Haleakala	Pan-STARRS 1	·	980 m	MPC · JPL
804396	2015 XC_{435}	—	December 9, 2015	Haleakala	Pan-STARRS 1	·	880 m	MPC · JPL
804397	2015 XS_{436}	—	December 5, 2015	Haleakala	Pan-STARRS 1	HNS	1.0 km	MPC · JPL
804398	2015 XT_{436}	—	December 7, 2015	Haleakala	Pan-STARRS 1	ADE	1.2 km	MPC · JPL
804399	2015 XM_{437}	—	December 5, 2015	Haleakala	Pan-STARRS 1	·	1.1 km	MPC · JPL
804400	2015 XE_{438}	—	December 4, 2015	Haleakala	Pan-STARRS 1	ADE	1.1 km	MPC · JPL

== 804401–804500 ==
back to top

Designation			Discovery			Properties		Ref
Permanent	Provisional	Named after	Date	Site	Discoverer(s)	Category	Diam.	Ref
804401	2015 XN_{439}	—	December 8, 2015	Haleakala	Pan-STARRS 1	·	720 m	MPC · JPL
804402	2015 XY_{440}	—	December 9, 2015	Mount Lemmon	Mount Lemmon Survey	·	1.1 km	MPC · JPL
804403	2015 XZ_{442}	—	December 4, 2015	Haleakala	Pan-STARRS 1	MAR	770 m	MPC · JPL
804404	2015 XA_{443}	—	December 13, 2015	Haleakala	Pan-STARRS 1	·	2.2 km	MPC · JPL
804405	2015 XC_{444}	—	December 5, 2015	Haleakala	Pan-STARRS 1	KON	1.5 km	MPC · JPL
804406	2015 XD_{444}	—	December 9, 2015	Haleakala	Pan-STARRS 1	·	2.6 km	MPC · JPL
804407	2015 XW_{445}	—	December 3, 2015	Mount Lemmon	Mount Lemmon Survey	L5	7.6 km	MPC · JPL
804408	2015 XL_{447}	—	December 4, 2015	Haleakala	Pan-STARRS 1	EUN	910 m	MPC · JPL
804409	2015 XF_{449}	—	December 9, 2015	Mount Lemmon	Mount Lemmon Survey	AGN	820 m	MPC · JPL
804410	2015 XG_{450}	—	December 14, 2015	Haleakala	Pan-STARRS 1	·	1.2 km	MPC · JPL
804411	2015 XA_{457}	—	December 10, 2015	Mount Lemmon	Mount Lemmon Survey	EUN	630 m	MPC · JPL
804412	2015 XC_{458}	—	December 14, 2015	Haleakala	Pan-STARRS 1	EOS	1.4 km	MPC · JPL
804413	2015 XK_{458}	—	December 9, 2015	Mount Lemmon	Mount Lemmon Survey	·	1.9 km	MPC · JPL
804414	2015 XQ_{463}	—	December 8, 2015	Haleakala	Pan-STARRS 1	·	1.2 km	MPC · JPL
804415	2015 XD_{466}	—	December 6, 2015	Mount Lemmon	Mount Lemmon Survey	critical	1.0 km	MPC · JPL
804416	2015 XO_{466}	—	December 3, 2015	Mount Lemmon	Mount Lemmon Survey	·	780 m	MPC · JPL
804417	2015 XW_{466}	—	December 13, 2015	Haleakala	Pan-STARRS 1	·	2.2 km	MPC · JPL
804418	2015 XX_{466}	—	December 13, 2015	Haleakala	Pan-STARRS 1	·	1.3 km	MPC · JPL
804419	2015 XH_{468}	—	December 6, 2015	Mount Lemmon	Mount Lemmon Survey	·	980 m	MPC · JPL
804420	2015 XK_{469}	—	December 8, 2015	Haleakala	Pan-STARRS 1	·	890 m	MPC · JPL
804421	2015 XO_{469}	—	December 3, 2015	Mount Lemmon	Mount Lemmon Survey	·	1.7 km	MPC · JPL
804422	2015 XE_{470}	—	December 9, 2015	Haleakala	Pan-STARRS 1	·	1.5 km	MPC · JPL
804423	2015 XJ_{470}	—	December 9, 2015	Haleakala	Pan-STARRS 1	critical	1.0 km	MPC · JPL
804424	2015 XM_{470}	—	December 14, 2015	Haleakala	Pan-STARRS 1	·	900 m	MPC · JPL
804425	2015 XT_{470}	—	December 6, 2015	Haleakala	Pan-STARRS 1	EUN	610 m	MPC · JPL
804426	2015 XK_{471}	—	December 14, 2015	Mount Lemmon	Mount Lemmon Survey	·	870 m	MPC · JPL
804427	2015 XP_{471}	—	December 3, 2015	Mount Lemmon	Mount Lemmon Survey	·	710 m	MPC · JPL
804428	2015 XR_{471}	—	December 3, 2015	Haleakala	Pan-STARRS 1	KON	1.9 km	MPC · JPL
804429	2015 XK_{472}	—	December 6, 2015	Haleakala	Pan-STARRS 1	·	850 m	MPC · JPL
804430	2015 XL_{472}	—	December 6, 2015	Mount Lemmon	Mount Lemmon Survey	·	1.1 km	MPC · JPL
804431	2015 XW_{474}	—	December 4, 2015	Haleakala	Pan-STARRS 1	·	990 m	MPC · JPL
804432	2015 XB_{478}	—	December 3, 2015	Mount Lemmon	Mount Lemmon Survey	KOR	980 m	MPC · JPL
804433	2015 XR_{478}	—	December 7, 2015	Haleakala	Pan-STARRS 1	EUN	700 m	MPC · JPL
804434	2015 XM_{481}	—	December 6, 2015	Mount Lemmon	Mount Lemmon Survey	(1547)	900 m	MPC · JPL
804435	2015 XN_{481}	—	December 7, 2015	Haleakala	Pan-STARRS 1	EUN	690 m	MPC · JPL
804436	2015 XY_{481}	—	December 14, 2015	Haleakala	Pan-STARRS 1	EOS	1.6 km	MPC · JPL
804437	2015 XY_{483}	—	December 13, 2015	Haleakala	Pan-STARRS 1	EUN	940 m	MPC · JPL
804438	2015 XZ_{483}	—	December 13, 2015	Haleakala	Pan-STARRS 1	GAL	1.1 km	MPC · JPL
804439	2015 XH_{486}	—	December 4, 2015	Haleakala	Pan-STARRS 1	·	1 km	MPC · JPL
804440	2015 XF_{487}	—	September 18, 2014	Haleakala	Pan-STARRS 1	·	2.1 km	MPC · JPL
804441	2015 XV_{487}	—	December 8, 2015	Mount Lemmon	Mount Lemmon Survey	·	2.2 km	MPC · JPL
804442	2015 XC_{488}	—	December 14, 2015	Haleakala	Pan-STARRS 1	·	2.4 km	MPC · JPL
804443	2015 XO_{489}	—	March 19, 2007	Mount Lemmon	Mount Lemmon Survey	EOS	1.3 km	MPC · JPL
804444	2015 XM_{491}	—	December 8, 2015	Haleakala	Pan-STARRS 1	·	1.9 km	MPC · JPL
804445	2015 XQ_{496}	—	December 9, 2015	Haleakala	Pan-STARRS 1	·	870 m	MPC · JPL
804446	2015 XU_{499}	—	December 6, 2015	Haleakala	Pan-STARRS 1	·	950 m	MPC · JPL
804447	2015 XN_{500}	—	December 7, 2015	Haleakala	Pan-STARRS 1	·	1.8 km	MPC · JPL
804448	2015 XG_{503}	—	December 8, 2015	Haleakala	Pan-STARRS 1	EUN	700 m	MPC · JPL
804449	2015 XK_{503}	—	December 8, 2015	Mount Lemmon	Mount Lemmon Survey	·	1.1 km	MPC · JPL
804450	2015 XQ_{504}	—	December 13, 2015	Haleakala	Pan-STARRS 1	·	820 m	MPC · JPL
804451	2015 XR_{504}	—	December 9, 2015	Haleakala	Pan-STARRS 1	·	880 m	MPC · JPL
804452	2015 XG_{505}	—	December 9, 2015	Haleakala	Pan-STARRS 1	·	890 m	MPC · JPL
804453	2015 XR_{505}	—	December 4, 2015	Haleakala	Pan-STARRS 1	·	1.1 km	MPC · JPL
804454	2015 XC_{506}	—	December 12, 2015	Haleakala	Pan-STARRS 1	MAR	580 m	MPC · JPL
804455	2015 XD_{506}	—	October 29, 2010	Mount Lemmon	Mount Lemmon Survey	·	1.0 km	MPC · JPL
804456	2015 XO_{513}	—	December 13, 2015	Haleakala	Pan-STARRS 1	·	2.7 km	MPC · JPL
804457	2015 YV_{3}	—	December 9, 2015	Haleakala	Pan-STARRS 1	·	2.2 km	MPC · JPL
804458	2015 YV_{4}	—	November 27, 2010	Mount Lemmon	Mount Lemmon Survey	H	370 m	MPC · JPL
804459	2015 YZ_{5}	—	November 12, 2015	Mount Lemmon	Mount Lemmon Survey	·	1.1 km	MPC · JPL
804460	2015 YC_{7}	—	January 18, 2012	Kitt Peak	Spacewatch	JUN	640 m	MPC · JPL
804461	2015 YM_{12}	—	December 31, 2015	Haleakala	Pan-STARRS 1	·	2.0 km	MPC · JPL
804462	2015 YR_{12}	—	October 14, 2015	Mount Lemmon	Mount Lemmon Survey	·	1.4 km	MPC · JPL
804463	2015 YL_{13}	—	December 16, 2015	Catalina	CSS	·	1.0 km	MPC · JPL
804464	2015 YM_{13}	—	December 31, 2015	Haleakala	Pan-STARRS 1	ADE	1.3 km	MPC · JPL
804465	2015 YV_{14}	—	December 31, 2015	Haleakala	Pan-STARRS 1	·	1.0 km	MPC · JPL
804466	2015 YQ_{15}	—	January 27, 2012	Kitt Peak	Spacewatch	·	1.5 km	MPC · JPL
804467	2015 YU_{15}	—	January 18, 2012	Mount Lemmon	Mount Lemmon Survey	·	1.0 km	MPC · JPL
804468	2015 YG_{16}	—	December 31, 2015	Haleakala	Pan-STARRS 1	·	960 m	MPC · JPL
804469	2015 YX_{17}	—	December 12, 2015	Haleakala	Pan-STARRS 1	·	1.1 km	MPC · JPL
804470	2015 YA_{19}	—	December 4, 2015	Haleakala	Pan-STARRS 1	·	1.2 km	MPC · JPL
804471	2015 YH_{21}	—	December 6, 2015	Mount Lemmon	Mount Lemmon Survey	·	1.1 km	MPC · JPL
804472	2015 YV_{21}	—	December 31, 2015	Haleakala	Pan-STARRS 1	H	440 m	MPC · JPL
804473	2015 YB_{22}	—	September 20, 2014	Mount Lemmon	Mount Lemmon Survey	EUN	790 m	MPC · JPL
804474	2015 YG_{22}	—	December 18, 2015	Mount Lemmon	Mount Lemmon Survey	·	950 m	MPC · JPL
804475	2015 YH_{22}	—	December 18, 2015	Mount Lemmon	Mount Lemmon Survey	·	1.3 km	MPC · JPL
804476	2015 YN_{22}	—	December 18, 2015	Mount Lemmon	Mount Lemmon Survey	·	1.1 km	MPC · JPL
804477	2015 YS_{22}	—	December 18, 2015	Mount Lemmon	Mount Lemmon Survey	·	1.2 km	MPC · JPL
804478	2015 YA_{23}	—	December 31, 2015	Mount Lemmon	Mount Lemmon Survey	·	980 m	MPC · JPL
804479	2015 YJ_{24}	—	October 16, 2009	Mount Lemmon	Mount Lemmon Survey	·	1.5 km	MPC · JPL
804480	2015 YU_{26}	—	February 13, 2008	Catalina	CSS	·	910 m	MPC · JPL
804481	2015 YW_{27}	—	February 20, 2012	Haleakala	Pan-STARRS 1	·	1.0 km	MPC · JPL
804482	2015 YN_{28}	—	December 18, 2015	Mount Lemmon	Mount Lemmon Survey	·	1.2 km	MPC · JPL
804483	2015 YU_{28}	—	December 18, 2015	Mount Lemmon	Mount Lemmon Survey	·	780 m	MPC · JPL
804484	2015 YG_{29}	—	December 18, 2015	Mount Lemmon	Mount Lemmon Survey	·	860 m	MPC · JPL
804485	2015 YH_{30}	—	October 23, 2006	Kitt Peak	Spacewatch	HNS	790 m	MPC · JPL
804486	2015 YP_{30}	—	December 18, 2015	Mount Lemmon	Mount Lemmon Survey	·	960 m	MPC · JPL
804487	2015 YZ_{30}	—	December 17, 2015	Mount Lemmon	Mount Lemmon Survey	·	1.0 km	MPC · JPL
804488	2015 YJ_{31}	—	December 21, 2015	Mount Lemmon	Mount Lemmon Survey	·	990 m	MPC · JPL
804489	2015 YZ_{31}	—	December 18, 2015	Mount Lemmon	Mount Lemmon Survey	·	1.0 km	MPC · JPL
804490	2015 YM_{32}	—	December 31, 2015	Kitt Peak	Spacewatch	·	1.1 km	MPC · JPL
804491	2015 YW_{32}	—	December 18, 2015	Mount Lemmon	Mount Lemmon Survey	L5	7.2 km	MPC · JPL
804492	2015 YQ_{33}	—	December 18, 2015	Mount Lemmon	Mount Lemmon Survey	·	1.1 km	MPC · JPL
804493	2015 YV_{33}	—	December 16, 2015	Mount Lemmon	Mount Lemmon Survey	·	810 m	MPC · JPL
804494	2015 YZ_{34}	—	December 18, 2015	Mount Lemmon	Mount Lemmon Survey	·	1.7 km	MPC · JPL
804495	2015 YO_{35}	—	December 18, 2015	Kitt Peak	Spacewatch	·	2.8 km	MPC · JPL
804496	2015 YD_{36}	—	December 18, 2015	Mount Lemmon	Mount Lemmon Survey	HNS	810 m	MPC · JPL
804497	2015 YP_{36}	—	December 19, 2015	Mount Lemmon	Mount Lemmon Survey	·	990 m	MPC · JPL
804498	2015 YF_{37}	—	December 18, 2015	Mount Lemmon	Mount Lemmon Survey	·	1.7 km	MPC · JPL
804499	2015 YP_{37}	—	December 21, 2015	Mount Lemmon	Mount Lemmon Survey	·	1.9 km	MPC · JPL
804500	2015 YQ_{37}	—	December 18, 2015	Mount Lemmon	Mount Lemmon Survey	HNS	680 m	MPC · JPL

== 804501–804600 ==
back to top

Designation			Discovery			Properties		Ref
Permanent	Provisional	Named after	Date	Site	Discoverer(s)	Category	Diam.	Ref
804501	2015 YJ_{38}	—	December 21, 2015	Mount Lemmon	Mount Lemmon Survey	·	1.3 km	MPC · JPL
804502	2016 AX_{8}	—	January 12, 2002	Socorro	LINEAR	H	430 m	MPC · JPL
804503	2016 AF_{11}	—	January 2, 2016	Haleakala	Pan-STARRS 1	·	980 m	MPC · JPL
804504	2016 AK_{18}	—	December 3, 2015	Mount Lemmon	Mount Lemmon Survey	·	1.2 km	MPC · JPL
804505	2016 AU_{18}	—	January 3, 2016	Mount Lemmon	Mount Lemmon Survey	HNS	1.1 km	MPC · JPL
804506	2016 AD_{19}	—	January 3, 2016	Mount Lemmon	Mount Lemmon Survey	·	1.2 km	MPC · JPL
804507	2016 AU_{22}	—	December 18, 2015	Mount Lemmon	Mount Lemmon Survey	·	1.3 km	MPC · JPL
804508	2016 AA_{26}	—	January 3, 2016	Haleakala	Pan-STARRS 1	(194)	1.2 km	MPC · JPL
804509	2016 AV_{27}	—	January 3, 2016	Mount Lemmon	Mount Lemmon Survey	·	1.6 km	MPC · JPL
804510	2016 AU_{32}	—	January 19, 2012	Haleakala	Pan-STARRS 1	·	890 m	MPC · JPL
804511	2016 AT_{33}	—	September 24, 2009	Mount Lemmon	Mount Lemmon Survey	·	1.1 km	MPC · JPL
804512	2016 AK_{35}	—	January 3, 2016	Mount Lemmon	Mount Lemmon Survey	(5)	810 m	MPC · JPL
804513	2016 AG_{41}	—	January 3, 2016	Mount Lemmon	Mount Lemmon Survey	·	840 m	MPC · JPL
804514	2016 AU_{45}	—	February 7, 2011	Mount Lemmon	Mount Lemmon Survey	·	2.0 km	MPC · JPL
804515	2016 AA_{47}	—	February 26, 2009	Calar Alto	F. Hormuth	3:2	3.1 km	MPC · JPL
804516	2016 AD_{47}	—	December 18, 2015	Mount Lemmon	Mount Lemmon Survey	·	1.3 km	MPC · JPL
804517	2016 AU_{48}	—	January 28, 2011	Mount Lemmon	Mount Lemmon Survey	EOS	1.2 km	MPC · JPL
804518	2016 AO_{52}	—	January 19, 2012	Haleakala	Pan-STARRS 1	·	1.2 km	MPC · JPL
804519	2016 AQ_{52}	—	February 5, 2011	Haleakala	Pan-STARRS 1	·	2.1 km	MPC · JPL
804520	2016 AC_{54}	—	January 4, 2016	Haleakala	Pan-STARRS 1	3:2	3.4 km	MPC · JPL
804521	2016 AA_{55}	—	December 18, 2015	Mount Lemmon	Mount Lemmon Survey	·	840 m	MPC · JPL
804522	2016 AR_{56}	—	January 4, 2016	Haleakala	Pan-STARRS 1	KOR	1.1 km	MPC · JPL
804523	2016 AD_{69}	—	January 7, 2006	Kitt Peak	Spacewatch	EOS	1.3 km	MPC · JPL
804524	2016 AX_{69}	—	July 16, 2004	Cerro Tololo	Deep Ecliptic Survey	KOR	860 m	MPC · JPL
804525	2016 AZ_{69}	—	February 26, 2008	Mount Lemmon	Mount Lemmon Survey	·	790 m	MPC · JPL
804526	2016 AD_{73}	—	August 20, 2001	Cerro Tololo	Deep Ecliptic Survey	·	870 m	MPC · JPL
804527	2016 AZ_{73}	—	January 4, 2016	Haleakala	Pan-STARRS 1	THB	2.2 km	MPC · JPL
804528	2016 AU_{76}	—	January 4, 2016	Haleakala	Pan-STARRS 1	·	890 m	MPC · JPL
804529	2016 AJ_{77}	—	January 4, 2016	Haleakala	Pan-STARRS 1	·	1.0 km	MPC · JPL
804530	2016 AN_{88}	—	December 8, 2015	Mount Lemmon	Mount Lemmon Survey	·	1.1 km	MPC · JPL
804531	2016 AS_{93}	—	October 13, 2006	Kitt Peak	Spacewatch	·	830 m	MPC · JPL
804532	2016 AU_{94}	—	December 18, 2015	Mount Lemmon	Mount Lemmon Survey	BRA	1.1 km	MPC · JPL
804533	2016 AP_{96}	—	January 7, 2016	Haleakala	Pan-STARRS 1	ADE	1.4 km	MPC · JPL
804534	2016 AZ_{97}	—	January 7, 2016	Haleakala	Pan-STARRS 1	·	980 m	MPC · JPL
804535	2016 AS_{99}	—	October 22, 2006	Kitt Peak	Spacewatch	·	900 m	MPC · JPL
804536	2016 AS_{103}	—	September 6, 2008	Kitt Peak	Spacewatch	EOS	1.5 km	MPC · JPL
804537	2016 AB_{105}	—	January 7, 2016	Haleakala	Pan-STARRS 1	·	930 m	MPC · JPL
804538	2016 AT_{105}	—	December 16, 2015	Mount Lemmon	Mount Lemmon Survey	·	1.2 km	MPC · JPL
804539	2016 AP_{109}	—	January 7, 2016	Haleakala	Pan-STARRS 1	LEO	1.1 km	MPC · JPL
804540	2016 AC_{110}	—	November 22, 2014	Haleakala	Pan-STARRS 1	·	2.2 km	MPC · JPL
804541	2016 AJ_{111}	—	January 7, 2016	Haleakala	Pan-STARRS 1	·	970 m	MPC · JPL
804542	2016 AL_{112}	—	January 7, 2016	Haleakala	Pan-STARRS 1	·	950 m	MPC · JPL
804543	2016 AK_{113}	—	January 7, 2016	Haleakala	Pan-STARRS 1	EUN	960 m	MPC · JPL
804544	2016 AP_{113}	—	December 26, 2006	Kitt Peak	Spacewatch	·	1.2 km	MPC · JPL
804545	2016 AN_{117}	—	January 8, 2016	Haleakala	Pan-STARRS 1	·	1.3 km	MPC · JPL
804546	2016 AO_{118}	—	January 8, 2016	Haleakala	Pan-STARRS 1	·	2.3 km	MPC · JPL
804547	2016 AW_{122}	—	January 8, 2016	Haleakala	Pan-STARRS 1	·	990 m	MPC · JPL
804548	2016 AG_{123}	—	September 18, 2010	Mount Lemmon	Mount Lemmon Survey	·	1.2 km	MPC · JPL
804549	2016 AT_{123}	—	January 8, 2016	Haleakala	Pan-STARRS 1	·	1.2 km	MPC · JPL
804550	2016 AZ_{123}	—	January 8, 2016	Haleakala	Pan-STARRS 1	·	1.0 km	MPC · JPL
804551	2016 AY_{127}	—	December 3, 2010	Mount Lemmon	Mount Lemmon Survey	·	1.2 km	MPC · JPL
804552	2016 AJ_{128}	—	March 31, 2003	Anderson Mesa	LONEOS	·	1.4 km	MPC · JPL
804553	2016 AC_{132}	—	October 31, 2010	Mount Lemmon	Mount Lemmon Survey	·	1.0 km	MPC · JPL
804554	2016 AT_{132}	—	August 20, 2014	Haleakala	Pan-STARRS 1	HNS	780 m	MPC · JPL
804555	2016 AF_{133}	—	January 9, 2016	Haleakala	Pan-STARRS 1	·	1.3 km	MPC · JPL
804556	2016 AN_{133}	—	January 9, 2016	Haleakala	Pan-STARRS 1	T_{j} (2.99)	2.7 km	MPC · JPL
804557	2016 AB_{135}	—	December 13, 2015	Haleakala	Pan-STARRS 1	·	1.0 km	MPC · JPL
804558	2016 AP_{136}	—	January 9, 2016	Haleakala	Pan-STARRS 1	·	1.3 km	MPC · JPL
804559	2016 AU_{137}	—	November 21, 2006	Mount Lemmon	Mount Lemmon Survey	MAR	830 m	MPC · JPL
804560	2016 AY_{138}	—	November 1, 2014	Mount Lemmon	Mount Lemmon Survey	·	2.1 km	MPC · JPL
804561	2016 AJ_{140}	—	September 25, 2014	Mount Lemmon	Mount Lemmon Survey	·	1.4 km	MPC · JPL
804562	2016 AS_{141}	—	December 9, 2015	Haleakala	Pan-STARRS 1	·	880 m	MPC · JPL
804563	2016 AX_{141}	—	January 25, 2012	Haleakala	Pan-STARRS 1	·	1.3 km	MPC · JPL
804564	2016 AB_{145}	—	November 24, 2009	Kitt Peak	Spacewatch	·	2.2 km	MPC · JPL
804565	2016 AC_{146}	—	January 9, 2016	Haleakala	Pan-STARRS 1	·	1.4 km	MPC · JPL
804566	2016 AD_{147}	—	December 13, 2015	Haleakala	Pan-STARRS 1	·	1.4 km	MPC · JPL
804567	2016 AH_{147}	—	December 13, 2015	Haleakala	Pan-STARRS 1	·	1.4 km	MPC · JPL
804568	2016 AW_{147}	—	October 10, 2010	Mount Lemmon	Mount Lemmon Survey	·	1.3 km	MPC · JPL
804569	2016 AD_{148}	—	November 17, 1999	Kitt Peak	Spacewatch	·	1.3 km	MPC · JPL
804570	2016 AE_{151}	—	January 11, 2016	Haleakala	Pan-STARRS 1	·	950 m	MPC · JPL
804571	2016 AL_{151}	—	January 11, 2016	Haleakala	Pan-STARRS 1	MAR	660 m	MPC · JPL
804572	2016 AP_{151}	—	January 11, 2016	Haleakala	Pan-STARRS 1	MAR	650 m	MPC · JPL
804573	2016 AK_{153}	—	December 13, 2015	Haleakala	Pan-STARRS 1	EUN	670 m	MPC · JPL
804574	2016 AY_{155}	—	December 8, 2015	Haleakala	Pan-STARRS 1	EUN	720 m	MPC · JPL
804575	2016 AR_{156}	—	December 6, 2015	Haleakala	Pan-STARRS 1	(194)	1.1 km	MPC · JPL
804576	2016 AU_{156}	—	January 11, 2016	Haleakala	Pan-STARRS 1	·	980 m	MPC · JPL
804577	2016 AZ_{156}	—	November 21, 2014	Mount Lemmon	Mount Lemmon Survey	·	2.7 km	MPC · JPL
804578	2016 AP_{159}	—	December 8, 2015	Haleakala	Pan-STARRS 1	·	1.0 km	MPC · JPL
804579	2016 AC_{160}	—	February 20, 2012	Haleakala	Pan-STARRS 1	·	1.3 km	MPC · JPL
804580	2016 AH_{160}	—	January 11, 2016	Haleakala	Pan-STARRS 1	·	2.2 km	MPC · JPL
804581	2016 AV_{162}	—	January 11, 2016	Haleakala	Pan-STARRS 1	·	1.0 km	MPC · JPL
804582	2016 AD_{163}	—	December 8, 2015	Haleakala	Pan-STARRS 1	·	950 m	MPC · JPL
804583	2016 AC_{167}	—	February 12, 2011	Mount Lemmon	Mount Lemmon Survey	EOS	1.4 km	MPC · JPL
804584	2016 AQ_{167}	—	January 9, 2016	Haleakala	Pan-STARRS 1	EUN	710 m	MPC · JPL
804585	2016 AM_{168}	—	January 9, 2016	Haleakala	Pan-STARRS 1	·	1.0 km	MPC · JPL
804586	2016 AF_{171}	—	December 10, 2015	Mount Lemmon	Mount Lemmon Survey	·	2.0 km	MPC · JPL
804587	2016 AB_{174}	—	September 25, 2014	Mount Lemmon	Mount Lemmon Survey	·	1.0 km	MPC · JPL
804588	2016 AS_{176}	—	December 8, 2015	Haleakala	Pan-STARRS 1	·	950 m	MPC · JPL
804589	2016 AE_{178}	—	December 13, 2015	Haleakala	Pan-STARRS 1	·	970 m	MPC · JPL
804590	2016 AZ_{182}	—	January 11, 2016	Haleakala	Pan-STARRS 1	·	1.3 km	MPC · JPL
804591	2016 AA_{186}	—	January 12, 2016	Haleakala	Pan-STARRS 1	·	1.3 km	MPC · JPL
804592	2016 AS_{187}	—	October 7, 2004	Kitt Peak	Spacewatch	·	1.0 km	MPC · JPL
804593	2016 AW_{191}	—	January 13, 2016	Mount Lemmon	Mount Lemmon Survey	·	1.2 km	MPC · JPL
804594	2016 AO_{200}	—	January 1, 2016	Haleakala	Pan-STARRS 1	·	2.0 km	MPC · JPL
804595	2016 AP_{201}	—	January 3, 2016	Haleakala	Pan-STARRS 1	·	890 m	MPC · JPL
804596	2016 AA_{202}	—	January 3, 2016	Haleakala	Pan-STARRS 1	MIS · critical	1.4 km	MPC · JPL
804597	2016 AF_{202}	—	January 3, 2016	Haleakala	Pan-STARRS 1	KRM	1.6 km	MPC · JPL
804598	2016 AP_{202}	—	January 3, 2016	Haleakala	Pan-STARRS 1	EUN	650 m	MPC · JPL
804599	2016 AN_{203}	—	November 12, 2006	Mount Lemmon	Mount Lemmon Survey	·	910 m	MPC · JPL
804600	2016 AS_{204}	—	November 21, 2015	Mount Lemmon	Mount Lemmon Survey	HNS	1.1 km	MPC · JPL

== 804601–804700 ==
back to top

Designation			Discovery			Properties		Ref
Permanent	Provisional	Named after	Date	Site	Discoverer(s)	Category	Diam.	Ref
804601	2016 AN_{205}	—	March 12, 2007	Mount Lemmon	Mount Lemmon Survey	·	980 m	MPC · JPL
804602	2016 AO_{205}	—	January 4, 2016	Haleakala	Pan-STARRS 1	·	1.4 km	MPC · JPL
804603	2016 AC_{206}	—	January 7, 2016	Haleakala	Pan-STARRS 1	·	1.1 km	MPC · JPL
804604	2016 AZ_{206}	—	August 23, 2014	Haleakala	Pan-STARRS 1	·	840 m	MPC · JPL
804605	2016 AP_{207}	—	January 7, 2016	Haleakala	Pan-STARRS 1	critical	1.0 km	MPC · JPL
804606	2016 AE_{208}	—	November 2, 2010	Mount Lemmon	Mount Lemmon Survey	·	960 m	MPC · JPL
804607	2016 AQ_{208}	—	January 8, 2016	Haleakala	Pan-STARRS 1	·	910 m	MPC · JPL
804608	2016 AW_{208}	—	January 8, 2016	Haleakala	Pan-STARRS 1	HNS	820 m	MPC · JPL
804609	2016 AQ_{209}	—	January 8, 2016	Haleakala	Pan-STARRS 1	·	1.5 km	MPC · JPL
804610	2016 AR_{209}	—	May 13, 2011	Nogales	M. Schwartz, P. R. Holvorcem	·	1.9 km	MPC · JPL
804611	2016 AV_{209}	—	January 8, 2016	Haleakala	Pan-STARRS 1	·	1.1 km	MPC · JPL
804612	2016 AB_{210}	—	January 8, 2016	Haleakala	Pan-STARRS 1	critical	1.1 km	MPC · JPL
804613	2016 AA_{211}	—	January 9, 2016	Haleakala	Pan-STARRS 1	·	1.2 km	MPC · JPL
804614	2016 AS_{211}	—	January 11, 2016	Haleakala	Pan-STARRS 1	MAR	680 m	MPC · JPL
804615	2016 AD_{212}	—	January 12, 2016	Haleakala	Pan-STARRS 1	·	1.1 km	MPC · JPL
804616	2016 AK_{212}	—	July 1, 2005	Palomar Mountain	NEAT	BAR	1.1 km	MPC · JPL
804617	2016 AF_{213}	—	February 17, 2007	Mount Lemmon	Mount Lemmon Survey	GAL	1.2 km	MPC · JPL
804618	2016 AZ_{213}	—	January 14, 2016	Haleakala	Pan-STARRS 1	·	1.2 km	MPC · JPL
804619	2016 AJ_{214}	—	January 14, 2016	Haleakala	Pan-STARRS 1	·	1.1 km	MPC · JPL
804620	2016 AE_{218}	—	September 11, 2010	Mount Lemmon	Mount Lemmon Survey	EUN	820 m	MPC · JPL
804621	2016 AM_{218}	—	January 3, 2016	Haleakala	Pan-STARRS 1	EUN	870 m	MPC · JPL
804622	2016 AA_{219}	—	October 1, 2005	Mount Lemmon	Mount Lemmon Survey	HNS	660 m	MPC · JPL
804623	2016 AX_{219}	—	January 4, 2016	Haleakala	Pan-STARRS 1	·	1.3 km	MPC · JPL
804624	2016 AX_{220}	—	January 3, 2016	Haleakala	Pan-STARRS 1	·	920 m	MPC · JPL
804625	2016 AQ_{222}	—	February 6, 2007	Mount Lemmon	Mount Lemmon Survey	·	1.2 km	MPC · JPL
804626	2016 AB_{226}	—	February 27, 2012	Haleakala	Pan-STARRS 1	·	1.1 km	MPC · JPL
804627	2016 AV_{226}	—	May 3, 2008	Mount Lemmon	Mount Lemmon Survey	·	930 m	MPC · JPL
804628	2016 AZ_{226}	—	January 12, 2016	Haleakala	Pan-STARRS 1	·	740 m	MPC · JPL
804629	2016 AH_{227}	—	January 14, 2016	Haleakala	Pan-STARRS 1	·	860 m	MPC · JPL
804630	2016 AN_{230}	—	January 14, 2016	Haleakala	Pan-STARRS 1	EOS	1.4 km	MPC · JPL
804631	2016 AR_{230}	—	January 15, 2016	Haleakala	Pan-STARRS 1	·	2.6 km	MPC · JPL
804632	2016 AH_{231}	—	October 16, 2009	Mount Lemmon	Mount Lemmon Survey	·	1.1 km	MPC · JPL
804633	2016 AU_{233}	—	December 10, 2009	Mount Lemmon	Mount Lemmon Survey	·	2.3 km	MPC · JPL
804634	2016 AX_{233}	—	January 30, 2011	Haleakala	Pan-STARRS 1	·	1.7 km	MPC · JPL
804635	2016 AD_{234}	—	January 4, 2016	Haleakala	Pan-STARRS 1	EOS	1.2 km	MPC · JPL
804636	2016 AK_{234}	—	January 7, 2016	Haleakala	Pan-STARRS 1	EOS	1.3 km	MPC · JPL
804637	2016 AG_{235}	—	October 28, 2014	Haleakala	Pan-STARRS 1	EOS	1.4 km	MPC · JPL
804638	2016 AT_{235}	—	February 8, 2011	Mount Lemmon	Mount Lemmon Survey	EOS	1.4 km	MPC · JPL
804639	2016 AD_{236}	—	October 29, 2014	Haleakala	Pan-STARRS 1	·	2.3 km	MPC · JPL
804640	2016 AQ_{239}	—	March 18, 2012	Piszkés-tető	K. Sárneczky, A. Szing	·	1.6 km	MPC · JPL
804641	2016 AV_{239}	—	January 2, 2016	Haleakala	Pan-STARRS 1	·	1 km	MPC · JPL
804642	2016 AH_{241}	—	February 24, 2012	Haleakala	Pan-STARRS 1	·	1.1 km	MPC · JPL
804643	2016 AQ_{242}	—	February 3, 2012	Haleakala	Pan-STARRS 1	·	1.0 km	MPC · JPL
804644	2016 AQ_{243}	—	February 3, 2012	Haleakala	Pan-STARRS 1	·	800 m	MPC · JPL
804645	2016 AD_{244}	—	April 1, 2008	Kitt Peak	Spacewatch	MIS	1.7 km	MPC · JPL
804646	2016 AE_{244}	—	January 19, 2012	Haleakala	Pan-STARRS 1	·	1.1 km	MPC · JPL
804647	2016 AO_{244}	—	March 13, 2012	Mount Lemmon	Mount Lemmon Survey	·	1.0 km	MPC · JPL
804648	2016 AO_{248}	—	October 28, 2014	Haleakala	Pan-STARRS 1	·	1.5 km	MPC · JPL
804649	2016 AB_{249}	—	October 22, 2006	Kitt Peak	Spacewatch	·	820 m	MPC · JPL
804650	2016 AM_{249}	—	January 4, 2016	Haleakala	Pan-STARRS 1	·	1.9 km	MPC · JPL
804651	2016 AN_{249}	—	October 24, 2003	Kitt Peak	Deep Ecliptic Survey	·	2.1 km	MPC · JPL
804652	2016 AJ_{250}	—	September 4, 2014	Haleakala	Pan-STARRS 1	·	1.0 km	MPC · JPL
804653	2016 AN_{250}	—	February 21, 2012	Mount Lemmon	Mount Lemmon Survey	·	1.3 km	MPC · JPL
804654	2016 AB_{252}	—	March 27, 2012	Mount Lemmon	Mount Lemmon Survey	·	1.0 km	MPC · JPL
804655	2016 AZ_{252}	—	August 17, 2013	Haleakala	Pan-STARRS 1	·	1.2 km	MPC · JPL
804656	2016 AE_{254}	—	January 7, 2016	Haleakala	Pan-STARRS 1	·	1.3 km	MPC · JPL
804657	2016 AR_{254}	—	January 7, 2016	Haleakala	Pan-STARRS 1	·	1.6 km	MPC · JPL
804658	2016 AN_{256}	—	January 7, 2016	Haleakala	Pan-STARRS 1	·	1.8 km	MPC · JPL
804659	2016 AR_{256}	—	January 7, 2016	Haleakala	Pan-STARRS 1	·	1.6 km	MPC · JPL
804660	2016 AC_{259}	—	November 20, 2014	Haleakala	Pan-STARRS 1	·	2.0 km	MPC · JPL
804661	2016 AX_{259}	—	January 8, 2016	Haleakala	Pan-STARRS 1	·	1.0 km	MPC · JPL
804662	2016 AC_{260}	—	January 8, 2016	Haleakala	Pan-STARRS 1	·	1.8 km	MPC · JPL
804663	2016 AP_{260}	—	January 8, 2016	Haleakala	Pan-STARRS 1	·	1.1 km	MPC · JPL
804664	2016 AN_{261}	—	April 12, 2005	Mount Lemmon	Mount Lemmon Survey	·	2.9 km	MPC · JPL
804665	2016 AY_{263}	—	February 23, 2012	Mount Lemmon	Mount Lemmon Survey	·	950 m	MPC · JPL
804666	2016 AC_{264}	—	January 9, 2016	Haleakala	Pan-STARRS 1	VER	1.8 km	MPC · JPL
804667	2016 AU_{265}	—	October 30, 2014	Mount Lemmon	Mount Lemmon Survey	EUN	930 m	MPC · JPL
804668	2016 AR_{266}	—	January 9, 2016	Haleakala	Pan-STARRS 1	·	1.4 km	MPC · JPL
804669	2016 AD_{267}	—	January 11, 2016	Haleakala	Pan-STARRS 1	·	1.6 km	MPC · JPL
804670	2016 AS_{267}	—	July 15, 2013	Haleakala	Pan-STARRS 1	·	1.1 km	MPC · JPL
804671	2016 AO_{268}	—	February 8, 2011	Mount Lemmon	Mount Lemmon Survey	·	1.9 km	MPC · JPL
804672	2016 AD_{269}	—	January 12, 2016	Haleakala	Pan-STARRS 1	·	1.3 km	MPC · JPL
804673	2016 AE_{270}	—	February 15, 2012	Haleakala	Pan-STARRS 1	·	1.3 km	MPC · JPL
804674	2016 AC_{273}	—	March 16, 2012	Haleakala	Pan-STARRS 1	EUN	830 m	MPC · JPL
804675	2016 AV_{274}	—	January 14, 2011	Mount Lemmon	Mount Lemmon Survey	·	1.5 km	MPC · JPL
804676	2016 AX_{275}	—	July 15, 2013	Haleakala	Pan-STARRS 1	·	1.3 km	MPC · JPL
804677	2016 AX_{276}	—	January 15, 2016	Haleakala	Pan-STARRS 1	·	1.1 km	MPC · JPL
804678	2016 AF_{277}	—	January 15, 2016	Haleakala	Pan-STARRS 1	·	2.4 km	MPC · JPL
804679	2016 AP_{277}	—	January 15, 2016	Haleakala	Pan-STARRS 1	·	1.0 km	MPC · JPL
804680	2016 AZ_{277}	—	January 15, 2016	Haleakala	Pan-STARRS 1	HYG	2.0 km	MPC · JPL
804681	2016 AP_{278}	—	January 4, 2016	Haleakala	Pan-STARRS 1	·	1.4 km	MPC · JPL
804682	2016 AU_{278}	—	January 12, 2016	Kitt Peak	Spacewatch	·	3.3 km	MPC · JPL
804683	2016 AS_{279}	—	January 3, 2016	Haleakala	Pan-STARRS 1	EUN	760 m	MPC · JPL
804684	2016 AB_{280}	—	January 12, 2016	Haleakala	Pan-STARRS 1	·	820 m	MPC · JPL
804685	2016 AJ_{280}	—	January 8, 2016	Haleakala	Pan-STARRS 1	·	1.4 km	MPC · JPL
804686	2016 AR_{280}	—	January 4, 2016	Haleakala	Pan-STARRS 1	HNS	650 m	MPC · JPL
804687	2016 AU_{280}	—	January 4, 2016	Haleakala	Pan-STARRS 1	·	2.1 km	MPC · JPL
804688	2016 AB_{281}	—	January 14, 2016	Haleakala	Pan-STARRS 1	·	1.6 km	MPC · JPL
804689	2016 AQ_{281}	—	January 8, 2016	Haleakala	Pan-STARRS 1	·	1.6 km	MPC · JPL
804690	2016 AN_{282}	—	January 13, 2016	Haleakala	Pan-STARRS 1	·	1.1 km	MPC · JPL
804691	2016 AB_{285}	—	January 7, 2016	Haleakala	Pan-STARRS 1	·	980 m	MPC · JPL
804692	2016 AW_{285}	—	January 8, 2016	Haleakala	Pan-STARRS 1	·	1.3 km	MPC · JPL
804693	2016 AA_{286}	—	January 14, 2016	Haleakala	Pan-STARRS 1	HNS	670 m	MPC · JPL
804694	2016 AB_{286}	—	January 4, 2016	Haleakala	Pan-STARRS 1	·	900 m	MPC · JPL
804695	2016 AD_{287}	—	January 7, 2016	ESA OGS	ESA OGS	·	990 m	MPC · JPL
804696	2016 AP_{289}	—	January 9, 2016	Haleakala	Pan-STARRS 1	·	970 m	MPC · JPL
804697	2016 AQ_{290}	—	May 20, 2018	Haleakala	Pan-STARRS 1	·	2.2 km	MPC · JPL
804698	2016 AA_{291}	—	January 9, 2016	Haleakala	Pan-STARRS 1	·	940 m	MPC · JPL
804699	2016 AY_{292}	—	January 1, 2016	Haleakala	Pan-STARRS 1	JUN	450 m	MPC · JPL
804700	2016 AC_{293}	—	January 4, 2016	Haleakala	Pan-STARRS 1	MAR	900 m	MPC · JPL

== 804701–804800 ==
back to top

Designation			Discovery			Properties		Ref
Permanent	Provisional	Named after	Date	Site	Discoverer(s)	Category	Diam.	Ref
804701	2016 AE_{293}	—	January 4, 2016	Haleakala	Pan-STARRS 1	JUN	910 m	MPC · JPL
804702	2016 AR_{294}	—	January 2, 2016	Haleakala	Pan-STARRS 1	·	1.0 km	MPC · JPL
804703	2016 AW_{295}	—	January 12, 2016	Haleakala	Pan-STARRS 1	·	1.1 km	MPC · JPL
804704	2016 AE_{296}	—	January 4, 2016	Haleakala	Pan-STARRS 1	KOR	990 m	MPC · JPL
804705	2016 AH_{296}	—	December 17, 1999	Kitt Peak	Spacewatch	·	870 m	MPC · JPL
804706	2016 AB_{297}	—	January 2, 2016	Haleakala	Pan-STARRS 1	·	980 m	MPC · JPL
804707	2016 AM_{297}	—	January 7, 2016	Haleakala	Pan-STARRS 1	·	1.0 km	MPC · JPL
804708	2016 AQ_{298}	—	January 13, 2016	Haleakala	Pan-STARRS 1	·	910 m	MPC · JPL
804709	2016 AG_{299}	—	January 3, 2016	Haleakala	Pan-STARRS 1	·	1.1 km	MPC · JPL
804710	2016 AU_{299}	—	January 8, 2016	Haleakala	Pan-STARRS 1	HNS	710 m	MPC · JPL
804711	2016 AK_{301}	—	January 7, 2016	Haleakala	Pan-STARRS 1	·	2.4 km	MPC · JPL
804712	2016 AQ_{301}	—	January 14, 2016	Haleakala	Pan-STARRS 1	EOS	1.4 km	MPC · JPL
804713	2016 AX_{301}	—	January 13, 2016	Kitt Peak	Spacewatch	·	880 m	MPC · JPL
804714	2016 AL_{302}	—	January 4, 2016	Haleakala	Pan-STARRS 1	·	1.2 km	MPC · JPL
804715	2016 AW_{303}	—	January 1, 2016	Mount Lemmon	Mount Lemmon Survey	BRG	1.1 km	MPC · JPL
804716	2016 AY_{305}	—	January 8, 2016	Haleakala	Pan-STARRS 1	EUN	740 m	MPC · JPL
804717	2016 AZ_{305}	—	January 14, 2016	Haleakala	Pan-STARRS 1	·	1.7 km	MPC · JPL
804718	2016 AC_{306}	—	January 15, 2016	Mount Lemmon	Mount Lemmon Survey	·	1.4 km	MPC · JPL
804719	2016 AZ_{306}	—	January 14, 2016	Haleakala	Pan-STARRS 1	·	1.8 km	MPC · JPL
804720	2016 AD_{308}	—	January 14, 2016	Haleakala	Pan-STARRS 1	BRG	1.2 km	MPC · JPL
804721	2016 AA_{309}	—	January 9, 2016	Haleakala	Pan-STARRS 1	·	1.5 km	MPC · JPL
804722	2016 AW_{312}	—	January 13, 2016	Haleakala	Pan-STARRS 1	·	2.3 km	MPC · JPL
804723	2016 AA_{313}	—	January 3, 2016	Haleakala	Pan-STARRS 1	·	880 m	MPC · JPL
804724	2016 AY_{313}	—	January 14, 2016	Haleakala	Pan-STARRS 1	·	1.2 km	MPC · JPL
804725	2016 AE_{314}	—	January 2, 2016	Mount Lemmon	Mount Lemmon Survey	·	990 m	MPC · JPL
804726	2016 AY_{315}	—	January 9, 2016	Haleakala	Pan-STARRS 1	·	2.1 km	MPC · JPL
804727	2016 AD_{316}	—	January 4, 2016	Haleakala	Pan-STARRS 1	·	2.4 km	MPC · JPL
804728	2016 AQ_{316}	—	January 3, 2016	Haleakala	Pan-STARRS 1	KOR	910 m	MPC · JPL
804729	2016 AO_{317}	—	January 4, 2016	Haleakala	Pan-STARRS 1	HOF	1.6 km	MPC · JPL
804730	2016 AW_{321}	—	January 12, 2016	Haleakala	Pan-STARRS 1	·	2.3 km	MPC · JPL
804731	2016 AR_{322}	—	January 14, 2016	Mount Lemmon	Mount Lemmon Survey	·	1.4 km	MPC · JPL
804732	2016 AA_{323}	—	January 12, 2016	Haleakala	Pan-STARRS 1	·	1.9 km	MPC · JPL
804733	2016 AF_{324}	—	January 3, 2016	Haleakala	Pan-STARRS 1	·	2.7 km	MPC · JPL
804734	2016 AB_{328}	—	January 3, 2016	Haleakala	Pan-STARRS 1	·	1.5 km	MPC · JPL
804735	2016 AT_{330}	—	January 8, 2016	Haleakala	Pan-STARRS 1	HOF	1.8 km	MPC · JPL
804736	2016 AE_{332}	—	January 3, 2016	Mount Lemmon	Mount Lemmon Survey	critical	1.0 km	MPC · JPL
804737	2016 AN_{332}	—	January 4, 2016	Haleakala	Pan-STARRS 1	MAR	860 m	MPC · JPL
804738	2016 AO_{334}	—	January 11, 2016	Haleakala	Pan-STARRS 1	JUN	600 m	MPC · JPL
804739	2016 AC_{335}	—	January 8, 2016	Haleakala	Pan-STARRS 1	·	1.1 km	MPC · JPL
804740	2016 AK_{335}	—	January 3, 2016	Mount Lemmon	Mount Lemmon Survey	·	2.1 km	MPC · JPL
804741	2016 AU_{335}	—	January 12, 2016	Haleakala	Pan-STARRS 1	·	2.0 km	MPC · JPL
804742	2016 AW_{335}	—	January 14, 2016	Haleakala	Pan-STARRS 1	·	1 km	MPC · JPL
804743	2016 AF_{338}	—	January 14, 2016	Haleakala	Pan-STARRS 1	·	2.0 km	MPC · JPL
804744	2016 AN_{338}	—	January 4, 2016	Haleakala	Pan-STARRS 1	·	1.4 km	MPC · JPL
804745	2016 AL_{339}	—	January 7, 2016	Haleakala	Pan-STARRS 1	·	1.5 km	MPC · JPL
804746	2016 AO_{339}	—	January 11, 2016	Haleakala	Pan-STARRS 1	·	1.4 km	MPC · JPL
804747	2016 AA_{340}	—	January 4, 2016	Haleakala	Pan-STARRS 1	·	1.2 km	MPC · JPL
804748	2016 AH_{340}	—	January 12, 2016	Haleakala	Pan-STARRS 1	·	1.1 km	MPC · JPL
804749	2016 AK_{340}	—	January 7, 2016	Haleakala	Pan-STARRS 1	·	1.1 km	MPC · JPL
804750	2016 AN_{340}	—	January 4, 2016	Haleakala	Pan-STARRS 1	·	1.0 km	MPC · JPL
804751	2016 AH_{341}	—	January 14, 2016	Haleakala	Pan-STARRS 1	·	1.2 km	MPC · JPL
804752	2016 AM_{341}	—	January 2, 2016	Kitt Peak	Spacewatch	·	840 m	MPC · JPL
804753	2016 AQ_{341}	—	January 4, 2016	Haleakala	Pan-STARRS 1	·	840 m	MPC · JPL
804754	2016 AS_{341}	—	January 11, 2016	Haleakala	Pan-STARRS 1	HNS	690 m	MPC · JPL
804755	2016 AT_{341}	—	January 3, 2016	Haleakala	Pan-STARRS 1	·	1.2 km	MPC · JPL
804756	2016 AV_{341}	—	January 12, 2016	Haleakala	Pan-STARRS 1	·	990 m	MPC · JPL
804757	2016 AW_{341}	—	January 9, 2016	Haleakala	Pan-STARRS 1	·	860 m	MPC · JPL
804758	2016 AZ_{341}	—	January 12, 2016	Haleakala	Pan-STARRS 1	·	1.3 km	MPC · JPL
804759	2016 AB_{342}	—	January 4, 2016	Haleakala	Pan-STARRS 1	·	990 m	MPC · JPL
804760	2016 AC_{342}	—	January 14, 2016	Haleakala	Pan-STARRS 1	·	840 m	MPC · JPL
804761	2016 AS_{343}	—	January 2, 2016	Mount Lemmon	Mount Lemmon Survey	·	920 m	MPC · JPL
804762	2016 AB_{346}	—	January 11, 2016	Haleakala	Pan-STARRS 1	·	1.2 km	MPC · JPL
804763	2016 AS_{347}	—	January 12, 2016	Haleakala	Pan-STARRS 1	EOS	1.3 km	MPC · JPL
804764	2016 AV_{347}	—	January 7, 2016	Haleakala	Pan-STARRS 1	·	880 m	MPC · JPL
804765	2016 AL_{348}	—	January 14, 2016	Haleakala	Pan-STARRS 1	HNS	780 m	MPC · JPL
804766	2016 AV_{348}	—	January 14, 2016	Haleakala	Pan-STARRS 1	·	2.4 km	MPC · JPL
804767	2016 AW_{348}	—	January 4, 2016	Haleakala	Pan-STARRS 1	·	2.0 km	MPC · JPL
804768	2016 AF_{349}	—	January 8, 2016	Haleakala	Pan-STARRS 1	·	1.1 km	MPC · JPL
804769	2016 AD_{350}	—	January 8, 2016	Haleakala	Pan-STARRS 1	MRX	720 m	MPC · JPL
804770	2016 AF_{350}	—	January 4, 2016	Haleakala	Pan-STARRS 1	EOS	1.2 km	MPC · JPL
804771	2016 AQ_{350}	—	January 14, 2016	Haleakala	Pan-STARRS 1	·	980 m	MPC · JPL
804772	2016 AO_{351}	—	January 14, 2016	Haleakala	Pan-STARRS 1	TIR	2.1 km	MPC · JPL
804773	2016 AR_{352}	—	January 12, 2016	Haleakala	Pan-STARRS 1	VER	1.6 km	MPC · JPL
804774	2016 AA_{356}	—	January 7, 2016	Haleakala	Pan-STARRS 1	·	1.3 km	MPC · JPL
804775	2016 AG_{356}	—	January 12, 2016	Haleakala	Pan-STARRS 1	·	930 m	MPC · JPL
804776	2016 AB_{357}	—	January 14, 2016	Haleakala	Pan-STARRS 1	·	1.2 km	MPC · JPL
804777	2016 AG_{357}	—	January 4, 2016	Haleakala	Pan-STARRS 1	·	1.6 km	MPC · JPL
804778	2016 AX_{357}	—	March 28, 2012	Mount Lemmon	Mount Lemmon Survey	AGN	780 m	MPC · JPL
804779	2016 AM_{359}	—	January 3, 2016	Haleakala	Pan-STARRS 1	·	1.2 km	MPC · JPL
804780	2016 AY_{360}	—	January 14, 2016	Haleakala	Pan-STARRS 1	·	1.8 km	MPC · JPL
804781	2016 AE_{361}	—	January 12, 2016	Haleakala	Pan-STARRS 1	·	910 m	MPC · JPL
804782	2016 AJ_{362}	—	January 9, 2016	Haleakala	Pan-STARRS 1	·	2.0 km	MPC · JPL
804783	2016 AL_{362}	—	January 19, 2005	Kitt Peak	Spacewatch	·	1.6 km	MPC · JPL
804784	2016 AT_{364}	—	September 20, 2014	Haleakala	Pan-STARRS 1	·	1.0 km	MPC · JPL
804785	2016 AX_{364}	—	January 14, 2016	Haleakala	Pan-STARRS 1	·	2.0 km	MPC · JPL
804786	2016 AB_{365}	—	January 4, 2016	Haleakala	Pan-STARRS 1	EOS	1.5 km	MPC · JPL
804787	2016 AO_{366}	—	January 7, 2016	Haleakala	Pan-STARRS 1	·	1.2 km	MPC · JPL
804788	2016 AM_{367}	—	October 9, 2005	Kitt Peak	Spacewatch	HNS	830 m	MPC · JPL
804789	2016 AO_{367}	—	January 4, 2016	Haleakala	Pan-STARRS 1	·	1.8 km	MPC · JPL
804790	2016 AS_{367}	—	January 13, 2016	Haleakala	Pan-STARRS 1	LIX	2.7 km	MPC · JPL
804791	2016 AV_{368}	—	January 4, 2016	Haleakala	Pan-STARRS 1	MRX	820 m	MPC · JPL
804792	2016 AF_{370}	—	January 5, 2016	Haleakala	Pan-STARRS 1	·	1.5 km	MPC · JPL
804793	2016 AW_{371}	—	January 4, 2016	Haleakala	Pan-STARRS 1	EUN	850 m	MPC · JPL
804794	2016 AG_{373}	—	January 11, 2016	Haleakala	Pan-STARRS 1	·	1.5 km	MPC · JPL
804795	2016 AO_{373}	—	January 14, 2016	Haleakala	Pan-STARRS 1	·	1.7 km	MPC · JPL
804796	2016 AV_{379}	—	January 13, 2016	Mount Lemmon	Mount Lemmon Survey	·	2.3 km	MPC · JPL
804797	2016 AH_{384}	—	January 11, 2016	Haleakala	Pan-STARRS 1	HNS	810 m	MPC · JPL
804798	2016 AD_{387}	—	January 9, 2016	Haleakala	Pan-STARRS 1	·	950 m	MPC · JPL
804799	2016 AH_{388}	—	February 5, 2011	Haleakala	Pan-STARRS 1	·	1.7 km	MPC · JPL
804800	2016 AK_{389}	—	January 4, 2016	Haleakala	Pan-STARRS 1	MAR	780 m	MPC · JPL

== 804801–804900 ==
back to top

Designation			Discovery			Properties		Ref
Permanent	Provisional	Named after	Date	Site	Discoverer(s)	Category	Diam.	Ref
804801	2016 BA	—	August 15, 2002	Palomar Mountain	NEAT	·	1.4 km	MPC · JPL
804802	2016 BP_{4}	—	January 4, 2016	Haleakala	Pan-STARRS 1	VER	2.0 km	MPC · JPL
804803	2016 BE_{11}	—	January 18, 2016	Haleakala	Pan-STARRS 1	·	1.5 km	MPC · JPL
804804	2016 BA_{17}	—	January 3, 2016	Haleakala	Pan-STARRS 1	·	1.0 km	MPC · JPL
804805	2016 BW_{19}	—	January 7, 2016	Haleakala	Pan-STARRS 1	·	1.3 km	MPC · JPL
804806	2016 BN_{22}	—	April 4, 2008	Kitt Peak	Spacewatch	·	930 m	MPC · JPL
804807	2016 BM_{24}	—	January 3, 2016	Mount Lemmon	Mount Lemmon Survey	·	1 km	MPC · JPL
804808	2016 BN_{24}	—	December 24, 2015	Haleakala	Pan-STARRS 1	JUN	670 m	MPC · JPL
804809	2016 BZ_{28}	—	January 7, 2016	Haleakala	Pan-STARRS 1	EOS	1.2 km	MPC · JPL
804810	2016 BT_{29}	—	January 4, 2016	Haleakala	Pan-STARRS 1	·	1.3 km	MPC · JPL
804811	2016 BK_{33}	—	January 29, 2016	Mount Lemmon	Mount Lemmon Survey	3:2	4.4 km	MPC · JPL
804812	2016 BU_{34}	—	January 7, 2016	Haleakala	Pan-STARRS 1	·	1.3 km	MPC · JPL
804813	2016 BX_{34}	—	January 7, 2016	Haleakala	Pan-STARRS 1	RAF	740 m	MPC · JPL
804814	2016 BG_{40}	—	January 29, 2016	Mount Lemmon	Mount Lemmon Survey	KOR	880 m	MPC · JPL
804815	2016 BU_{40}	—	March 22, 2012	Mount Lemmon	Mount Lemmon Survey	·	1.0 km	MPC · JPL
804816	2016 BJ_{42}	—	January 29, 2016	Mount Lemmon	Mount Lemmon Survey	·	1.1 km	MPC · JPL
804817	2016 BT_{42}	—	November 24, 2006	Mount Lemmon	Mount Lemmon Survey	·	910 m	MPC · JPL
804818	2016 BJ_{43}	—	March 1, 2011	Mount Lemmon	Mount Lemmon Survey	·	2.3 km	MPC · JPL
804819	2016 BT_{43}	—	January 11, 2008	Kitt Peak	Spacewatch	3:2	3.4 km	MPC · JPL
804820	2016 BY_{46}	—	January 15, 2016	Haleakala	Pan-STARRS 1	·	1.4 km	MPC · JPL
804821	2016 BF_{47}	—	January 28, 2016	Mount Lemmon	Mount Lemmon Survey	·	1.3 km	MPC · JPL
804822	2016 BO_{47}	—	January 7, 2016	Haleakala	Pan-STARRS 1	·	990 m	MPC · JPL
804823	2016 BR_{49}	—	February 4, 2012	Haleakala	Pan-STARRS 1	·	1.0 km	MPC · JPL
804824	2016 BK_{50}	—	January 4, 2016	Haleakala	Pan-STARRS 1	ADE	1.3 km	MPC · JPL
804825	2016 BV_{51}	—	February 16, 2012	Haleakala	Pan-STARRS 1	·	890 m	MPC · JPL
804826	2016 BD_{52}	—	January 30, 2016	Mount Lemmon	Mount Lemmon Survey	MIS	1.9 km	MPC · JPL
804827	2016 BT_{52}	—	March 1, 2012	Mount Lemmon	Mount Lemmon Survey	·	1.0 km	MPC · JPL
804828	2016 BH_{54}	—	January 3, 2016	Mount Lemmon	Mount Lemmon Survey	·	2.2 km	MPC · JPL
804829	2016 BU_{54}	—	January 11, 2008	Mount Lemmon	Mount Lemmon Survey	3:2	4.0 km	MPC · JPL
804830	2016 BK_{66}	—	December 17, 2015	Mount Lemmon	Mount Lemmon Survey	JUN	760 m	MPC · JPL
804831	2016 BG_{67}	—	November 1, 2010	Mount Lemmon	Mount Lemmon Survey	·	1.0 km	MPC · JPL
804832	2016 BU_{71}	—	January 31, 2016	Haleakala	Pan-STARRS 1	·	800 m	MPC · JPL
804833	2016 BT_{72}	—	January 19, 2012	Mount Lemmon	Mount Lemmon Survey	·	1.3 km	MPC · JPL
804834	2016 BE_{74}	—	May 23, 2012	Mount Lemmon	Mount Lemmon Survey	·	1 km	MPC · JPL
804835	2016 BF_{76}	—	August 3, 2014	Haleakala	Pan-STARRS 1	·	490 m	MPC · JPL
804836	2016 BZ_{78}	—	January 31, 2016	Haleakala	Pan-STARRS 1	·	1.8 km	MPC · JPL
804837	2016 BP_{79}	—	January 5, 2012	Haleakala	Pan-STARRS 1	JUN	840 m	MPC · JPL
804838	2016 BQ_{79}	—	November 27, 2010	Mount Lemmon	Mount Lemmon Survey	·	1.1 km	MPC · JPL
804839	2016 BH_{80}	—	March 4, 2012	Mount Lemmon	Mount Lemmon Survey	·	1.1 km	MPC · JPL
804840	2016 BO_{80}	—	December 4, 2015	Mount Lemmon	Mount Lemmon Survey	BRG	1.4 km	MPC · JPL
804841	2016 BX_{80}	—	January 31, 2016	Haleakala	Pan-STARRS 1	APO	250 m	MPC · JPL
804842	2016 BZ_{83}	—	January 16, 2016	Haleakala	Pan-STARRS 1	·	1.1 km	MPC · JPL
804843	2016 BP_{84}	—	January 17, 2016	Haleakala	Pan-STARRS 1	·	1.2 km	MPC · JPL
804844	2016 BD_{85}	—	April 9, 2003	Palomar Mountain	NEAT	JUN	710 m	MPC · JPL
804845	2016 BE_{85}	—	January 17, 2016	Haleakala	Pan-STARRS 1	·	1.4 km	MPC · JPL
804846	2016 BB_{86}	—	January 18, 2016	Haleakala	Pan-STARRS 1	·	1.4 km	MPC · JPL
804847	2016 BB_{90}	—	April 11, 2012	Mount Lemmon	Mount Lemmon Survey	AGN	810 m	MPC · JPL
804848	2016 BW_{90}	—	February 23, 2012	Mount Lemmon	Mount Lemmon Survey	·	1.0 km	MPC · JPL
804849	2016 BQ_{91}	—	January 30, 2016	Mount Lemmon	Mount Lemmon Survey	·	860 m	MPC · JPL
804850	2016 BV_{91}	—	January 31, 2016	Haleakala	Pan-STARRS 1	ADE	1.1 km	MPC · JPL
804851	2016 BK_{92}	—	December 11, 2014	Mount Lemmon	Mount Lemmon Survey	·	2.2 km	MPC · JPL
804852	2016 BB_{94}	—	November 17, 2014	Haleakala	Pan-STARRS 1	THM	1.6 km	MPC · JPL
804853	2016 BH_{94}	—	March 3, 2012	Kitt Peak	Spacewatch	JUN	680 m	MPC · JPL
804854	2016 BK_{94}	—	February 1, 2012	Kitt Peak	Spacewatch	HNS	810 m	MPC · JPL
804855	2016 BO_{94}	—	February 23, 2012	Mount Lemmon	Mount Lemmon Survey	EUN	810 m	MPC · JPL
804856	2016 BS_{94}	—	April 13, 2012	Haleakala	Pan-STARRS 1	·	1.0 km	MPC · JPL
804857	2016 BP_{96}	—	November 1, 2010	Mount Lemmon	Mount Lemmon Survey	·	970 m	MPC · JPL
804858	2016 BZ_{96}	—	November 28, 2010	Mount Lemmon	Mount Lemmon Survey	EUN	680 m	MPC · JPL
804859	2016 BV_{97}	—	March 24, 2012	Mount Lemmon	Mount Lemmon Survey	(5)	780 m	MPC · JPL
804860	2016 BW_{99}	—	October 29, 2014	Haleakala	Pan-STARRS 1	·	1.9 km	MPC · JPL
804861	2016 BK_{100}	—	April 24, 2012	Mount Lemmon	Mount Lemmon Survey	·	1.1 km	MPC · JPL
804862	2016 BX_{100}	—	January 10, 2011	Mount Lemmon	Mount Lemmon Survey	·	1.3 km	MPC · JPL
804863	2016 BH_{102}	—	January 19, 2016	Haleakala	Pan-STARRS 1	·	1.6 km	MPC · JPL
804864	2016 BJ_{104}	—	April 1, 2012	Haleakala	Pan-STARRS 1	EUN	870 m	MPC · JPL
804865	2016 BN_{104}	—	January 31, 2016	Haleakala	Pan-STARRS 1	·	2.8 km	MPC · JPL
804866	2016 BM_{106}	—	January 17, 2016	Haleakala	Pan-STARRS 1	·	1.1 km	MPC · JPL
804867	2016 BZ_{106}	—	January 19, 2016	Haleakala	Pan-STARRS 1	·	1.0 km	MPC · JPL
804868	2016 BK_{107}	—	January 31, 2016	Haleakala	Pan-STARRS 1	·	1.1 km	MPC · JPL
804869	2016 BO_{107}	—	January 28, 2016	Haleakala	Pan-STARRS 1	·	1.1 km	MPC · JPL
804870	2016 BM_{109}	—	January 20, 2016	Haleakala	Pan-STARRS 1	·	1.0 km	MPC · JPL
804871	2016 BO_{109}	—	January 30, 2016	Haleakala	Pan-STARRS 1	·	1.1 km	MPC · JPL
804872	2016 BG_{110}	—	January 30, 2016	Haleakala	Pan-STARRS 1	JUN	610 m	MPC · JPL
804873	2016 BF_{111}	—	January 20, 2016	Haleakala	Pan-STARRS 1	·	1.0 km	MPC · JPL
804874	2016 BL_{111}	—	January 27, 2016	Haleakala	Pan-STARRS 1	HNS	750 m	MPC · JPL
804875	2016 BZ_{111}	—	January 18, 2016	Haleakala	Pan-STARRS 1	·	1.3 km	MPC · JPL
804876	2016 BG_{112}	—	January 18, 2016	Mount Lemmon	Mount Lemmon Survey	ADE	1.4 km	MPC · JPL
804877	2016 BH_{113}	—	January 29, 2016	Haleakala	Pan-STARRS 1	·	1.4 km	MPC · JPL
804878	2016 BS_{113}	—	January 31, 2016	Haleakala	Pan-STARRS 1	AGN	750 m	MPC · JPL
804879	2016 BJ_{114}	—	January 30, 2016	Mount Lemmon	Mount Lemmon Survey	MAR	820 m	MPC · JPL
804880	2016 BY_{116}	—	January 29, 2016	Mount Lemmon	Mount Lemmon Survey	·	1.8 km	MPC · JPL
804881	2016 BA_{117}	—	January 29, 2016	Mount Lemmon	Mount Lemmon Survey	·	920 m	MPC · JPL
804882	2016 BS_{117}	—	January 29, 2016	Mount Lemmon	Mount Lemmon Survey	·	1.0 km	MPC · JPL
804883	2016 BT_{117}	—	January 31, 2016	Haleakala	Pan-STARRS 1	MAR	660 m	MPC · JPL
804884	2016 BG_{119}	—	January 31, 2016	Haleakala	Pan-STARRS 1	EOS	1.4 km	MPC · JPL
804885	2016 BL_{122}	—	January 18, 2016	Haleakala	Pan-STARRS 1	·	2.1 km	MPC · JPL
804886	2016 BD_{124}	—	January 16, 2016	Haleakala	Pan-STARRS 1	·	1.3 km	MPC · JPL
804887	2016 BY_{124}	—	January 18, 2016	Mount Lemmon	Mount Lemmon Survey	·	1.1 km	MPC · JPL
804888	2016 BP_{125}	—	January 17, 2016	Haleakala	Pan-STARRS 1	·	1.0 km	MPC · JPL
804889	2016 BU_{125}	—	January 29, 2016	Mount Lemmon	Mount Lemmon Survey	·	1.2 km	MPC · JPL
804890	2016 BJ_{126}	—	January 28, 2016	Mount Lemmon	Mount Lemmon Survey	·	910 m	MPC · JPL
804891	2016 BL_{126}	—	January 30, 2016	Mount Lemmon	Mount Lemmon Survey	EOS	1.3 km	MPC · JPL
804892	2016 BP_{126}	—	January 17, 2016	Haleakala	Pan-STARRS 1	·	1.1 km	MPC · JPL
804893	2016 BB_{127}	—	January 31, 2016	Haleakala	Pan-STARRS 1	·	1.0 km	MPC · JPL
804894	2016 BN_{127}	—	January 16, 2016	Haleakala	Pan-STARRS 1	·	1.1 km	MPC · JPL
804895	2016 BG_{128}	—	January 17, 2016	Haleakala	Pan-STARRS 1	·	1.1 km	MPC · JPL
804896	2016 BW_{128}	—	January 17, 2016	Haleakala	Pan-STARRS 1	·	1.7 km	MPC · JPL
804897	2016 BD_{129}	—	January 31, 2016	Haleakala	Pan-STARRS 1	EOS	1.3 km	MPC · JPL
804898	2016 BM_{131}	—	November 22, 2014	Haleakala	Pan-STARRS 1	·	1.4 km	MPC · JPL
804899	2016 BN_{131}	—	January 30, 2016	Mount Lemmon	Mount Lemmon Survey	·	1.0 km	MPC · JPL
804900	2016 BP_{134}	—	November 24, 2014	Haleakala	Pan-STARRS 1	·	1.9 km	MPC · JPL

== 804901–805000 ==
back to top

Designation			Discovery			Properties		Ref
Permanent	Provisional	Named after	Date	Site	Discoverer(s)	Category	Diam.	Ref
804901	2016 BQ_{134}	—	January 17, 2016	Haleakala	Pan-STARRS 1	·	2.1 km	MPC · JPL
804902	2016 BF_{135}	—	January 19, 2016	Mount Lemmon	Mount Lemmon Survey	NAE	1.6 km	MPC · JPL
804903	2016 BR_{135}	—	January 16, 2016	Haleakala	Pan-STARRS 1	·	2.0 km	MPC · JPL
804904	2016 BQ_{137}	—	October 21, 2006	Mount Lemmon	Mount Lemmon Survey	·	890 m	MPC · JPL
804905	2016 BV_{140}	—	January 17, 2016	Haleakala	Pan-STARRS 1	·	1.4 km	MPC · JPL
804906	2016 BZ_{140}	—	January 31, 2016	Haleakala	Pan-STARRS 1	·	1.3 km	MPC · JPL
804907	2016 BJ_{141}	—	January 19, 2016	Mount Lemmon	Mount Lemmon Survey	(5)	860 m	MPC · JPL
804908	2016 BO_{142}	—	January 30, 2016	Mount Lemmon	Mount Lemmon Survey	·	820 m	MPC · JPL
804909	2016 BL_{144}	—	October 2, 2014	Haleakala	Pan-STARRS 1	·	1.7 km	MPC · JPL
804910	2016 BN_{146}	—	January 30, 2016	Mount Lemmon	Mount Lemmon Survey	·	1.2 km	MPC · JPL
804911	2016 CF_{6}	—	January 15, 2016	Haleakala	Pan-STARRS 1	EOS	1.4 km	MPC · JPL
804912	2016 CF_{8}	—	February 1, 2016	Haleakala	Pan-STARRS 1	·	2.2 km	MPC · JPL
804913	2016 CA_{11}	—	January 4, 2016	Haleakala	Pan-STARRS 1	·	960 m	MPC · JPL
804914	2016 CA_{13}	—	December 10, 2006	Kitt Peak	Spacewatch	·	930 m	MPC · JPL
804915	2016 CG_{14}	—	February 1, 2016	Haleakala	Pan-STARRS 1	·	2.1 km	MPC · JPL
804916	2016 CJ_{16}	—	November 15, 2014	Westfield	International Astronomical Search Collaboration	·	2.0 km	MPC · JPL
804917	2016 CC_{17}	—	February 16, 2012	Haleakala	Pan-STARRS 1	·	1.2 km	MPC · JPL
804918	2016 CN_{17}	—	January 8, 2016	Haleakala	Pan-STARRS 1	·	1.4 km	MPC · JPL
804919	2016 CC_{19}	—	January 4, 2016	Haleakala	Pan-STARRS 1	·	1.2 km	MPC · JPL
804920	2016 CN_{20}	—	February 1, 2016	Haleakala	Pan-STARRS 1	·	920 m	MPC · JPL
804921	2016 CV_{21}	—	February 1, 2016	Haleakala	Pan-STARRS 1	MAR	720 m	MPC · JPL
804922	2016 CA_{22}	—	February 27, 2012	Haleakala	Pan-STARRS 1	·	940 m	MPC · JPL
804923	2016 CF_{22}	—	January 17, 2016	Haleakala	Pan-STARRS 1	·	1.0 km	MPC · JPL
804924	2016 CW_{22}	—	November 1, 2010	Mount Lemmon	Mount Lemmon Survey	MIS	1.8 km	MPC · JPL
804925	2016 CH_{25}	—	January 1, 2016	Mount Lemmon	Mount Lemmon Survey	·	1.1 km	MPC · JPL
804926	2016 CP_{29}	—	May 27, 2012	Mount Lemmon	Mount Lemmon Survey	·	1.2 km	MPC · JPL
804927	2016 CB_{38}	—	January 18, 2016	Haleakala	Pan-STARRS 1	·	940 m	MPC · JPL
804928	2016 CT_{38}	—	January 31, 2016	Haleakala	Pan-STARRS 1	·	850 m	MPC · JPL
804929	2016 CZ_{38}	—	January 31, 2016	Haleakala	Pan-STARRS 1	EUN	920 m	MPC · JPL
804930	2016 CE_{39}	—	July 25, 2014	Haleakala	Pan-STARRS 1	(5)	930 m	MPC · JPL
804931	2016 CY_{40}	—	July 28, 2014	Haleakala	Pan-STARRS 1	(5)	910 m	MPC · JPL
804932	2016 CA_{42}	—	January 7, 2016	Haleakala	Pan-STARRS 1	HNS	840 m	MPC · JPL
804933	2016 CE_{42}	—	February 3, 2016	Haleakala	Pan-STARRS 1	·	1.4 km	MPC · JPL
804934	2016 CU_{45}	—	October 26, 2001	Kitt Peak	Spacewatch	·	760 m	MPC · JPL
804935	2016 CV_{45}	—	February 3, 2016	Haleakala	Pan-STARRS 1	·	1.1 km	MPC · JPL
804936	2016 CQ_{50}	—	February 3, 2016	Haleakala	Pan-STARRS 1	·	1.3 km	MPC · JPL
804937	2016 CD_{51}	—	February 3, 2016	Haleakala	Pan-STARRS 1	·	860 m	MPC · JPL
804938	2016 CN_{51}	—	January 14, 2016	Haleakala	Pan-STARRS 1	EUN	700 m	MPC · JPL
804939	2016 CF_{52}	—	February 3, 2016	Haleakala	Pan-STARRS 1	·	1.5 km	MPC · JPL
804940	2016 CM_{53}	—	November 10, 2013	Mount Lemmon	Mount Lemmon Survey	3:2	3.8 km	MPC · JPL
804941	2016 CM_{54}	—	May 3, 2008	Mount Lemmon	Mount Lemmon Survey	·	1.0 km	MPC · JPL
804942	2016 CF_{57}	—	April 30, 2008	Mount Lemmon	Mount Lemmon Survey	·	1.1 km	MPC · JPL
804943	2016 CL_{58}	—	November 12, 2010	Kitt Peak	Spacewatch	·	1.1 km	MPC · JPL
804944	2016 CH_{59}	—	February 26, 2012	Kitt Peak	Spacewatch	·	1.1 km	MPC · JPL
804945	2016 CS_{60}	—	February 3, 2016	Haleakala	Pan-STARRS 1	·	1.0 km	MPC · JPL
804946	2016 CV_{60}	—	March 16, 2012	Kitt Peak	Spacewatch	·	1.2 km	MPC · JPL
804947	2016 CB_{61}	—	November 23, 2014	Haleakala	Pan-STARRS 1	EOS	1.4 km	MPC · JPL
804948	2016 CD_{63}	—	January 9, 2016	Haleakala	Pan-STARRS 1	HNS	760 m	MPC · JPL
804949	2016 CQ_{63}	—	February 24, 2012	Mount Lemmon	Mount Lemmon Survey	·	1.2 km	MPC · JPL
804950	2016 CZ_{63}	—	May 1, 2008	Kitt Peak	Spacewatch	EUN	1.1 km	MPC · JPL
804951	2016 CW_{64}	—	February 3, 2016	Haleakala	Pan-STARRS 1	·	2.3 km	MPC · JPL
804952	2016 CB_{66}	—	January 3, 2016	Haleakala	Pan-STARRS 1	·	1.3 km	MPC · JPL
804953	2016 CE_{66}	—	February 3, 2016	Haleakala	Pan-STARRS 1	·	2.3 km	MPC · JPL
804954	2016 CG_{68}	—	October 2, 2014	Haleakala	Pan-STARRS 1	·	1.5 km	MPC · JPL
804955	2016 CK_{68}	—	March 26, 2012	Piszkéstető	K. Sárneczky	(1547)	1.1 km	MPC · JPL
804956	2016 CE_{69}	—	February 3, 2016	Haleakala	Pan-STARRS 1	·	1.5 km	MPC · JPL
804957	2016 CU_{69}	—	February 3, 2016	Haleakala	Pan-STARRS 1	·	3.1 km	MPC · JPL
804958	2016 CM_{71}	—	January 18, 2016	Haleakala	Pan-STARRS 1	·	1.3 km	MPC · JPL
804959	2016 CK_{73}	—	January 13, 2016	Haleakala	Pan-STARRS 1	·	1.2 km	MPC · JPL
804960	2016 CT_{75}	—	November 21, 2014	Haleakala	Pan-STARRS 1	ADE	1.8 km	MPC · JPL
804961	2016 CE_{77}	—	July 14, 2013	Haleakala	Pan-STARRS 1	EOS	1.4 km	MPC · JPL
804962	2016 CW_{78}	—	February 5, 2016	Haleakala	Pan-STARRS 1	·	1.0 km	MPC · JPL
804963	2016 CE_{82}	—	February 5, 2016	Haleakala	Pan-STARRS 1	·	1.7 km	MPC · JPL
804964	2016 CZ_{90}	—	November 28, 2014	Haleakala	Pan-STARRS 1	·	1.1 km	MPC · JPL
804965	2016 CF_{91}	—	December 3, 2010	Mount Lemmon	Mount Lemmon Survey	·	1.2 km	MPC · JPL
804966	2016 CR_{93}	—	April 9, 2008	Kitt Peak	Spacewatch	·	1.0 km	MPC · JPL
804967	2016 CY_{93}	—	November 21, 2014	Haleakala	Pan-STARRS 1	·	1.7 km	MPC · JPL
804968	2016 CJ_{94}	—	January 4, 2016	Haleakala	Pan-STARRS 1	·	1.7 km	MPC · JPL
804969	2016 CY_{96}	—	February 21, 2012	Kitt Peak	Spacewatch	·	730 m	MPC · JPL
804970	2016 CW_{98}	—	February 5, 2016	Haleakala	Pan-STARRS 1	·	1.4 km	MPC · JPL
804971	2016 CF_{99}	—	February 21, 2012	Kitt Peak	Spacewatch	·	890 m	MPC · JPL
804972	2016 CR_{100}	—	February 5, 2016	Haleakala	Pan-STARRS 1	EUN	850 m	MPC · JPL
804973	2016 CY_{100}	—	August 22, 2014	Haleakala	Pan-STARRS 1	·	1.2 km	MPC · JPL
804974	2016 CV_{103}	—	October 30, 2014	Haleakala	Pan-STARRS 1	·	900 m	MPC · JPL
804975	2016 CX_{103}	—	January 16, 2016	Haleakala	Pan-STARRS 1	(1547)	800 m	MPC · JPL
804976	2016 CC_{104}	—	August 12, 2013	Haleakala	Pan-STARRS 1	·	2.3 km	MPC · JPL
804977	2016 CF_{107}	—	January 4, 2016	Haleakala	Pan-STARRS 1	·	1.3 km	MPC · JPL
804978	2016 CU_{108}	—	September 1, 2013	Haleakala	Pan-STARRS 1	·	1.7 km	MPC · JPL
804979	2016 CQ_{109}	—	January 4, 2016	Haleakala	Pan-STARRS 1	·	1.3 km	MPC · JPL
804980	2016 CA_{110}	—	June 20, 2013	Haleakala	Pan-STARRS 1	·	1.3 km	MPC · JPL
804981	2016 CF_{111}	—	February 5, 2016	Haleakala	Pan-STARRS 1	·	1.2 km	MPC · JPL
804982	2016 CR_{111}	—	December 9, 2015	Haleakala	Pan-STARRS 1	·	1.4 km	MPC · JPL
804983	2016 CO_{112}	—	February 5, 2016	Haleakala	Pan-STARRS 1	EOS	1.2 km	MPC · JPL
804984	2016 CF_{115}	—	November 16, 2006	Kitt Peak	Spacewatch	·	1.0 km	MPC · JPL
804985	2016 CH_{117}	—	January 14, 2016	Haleakala	Pan-STARRS 1	·	1.1 km	MPC · JPL
804986	2016 CM_{117}	—	October 1, 2008	Kitt Peak	Spacewatch	·	2.1 km	MPC · JPL
804987	2016 CY_{121}	—	November 15, 2014	Mount Lemmon	Mount Lemmon Survey	·	1.2 km	MPC · JPL
804988	2016 CA_{124}	—	January 17, 2016	Haleakala	Pan-STARRS 1	·	1.1 km	MPC · JPL
804989	2016 CQ_{125}	—	August 15, 2013	Haleakala	Pan-STARRS 1	·	1.5 km	MPC · JPL
804990	2016 CV_{125}	—	March 30, 2012	Mount Lemmon	Mount Lemmon Survey	·	860 m	MPC · JPL
804991	2016 CK_{127}	—	February 5, 2016	Haleakala	Pan-STARRS 1	VER	1.9 km	MPC · JPL
804992	2016 CR_{127}	—	April 13, 2012	Haleakala	Pan-STARRS 1	·	840 m	MPC · JPL
804993	2016 CO_{128}	—	February 5, 2016	Haleakala	Pan-STARRS 1	·	1.1 km	MPC · JPL
804994	2016 CU_{130}	—	January 27, 2007	Kitt Peak	Spacewatch	·	1.2 km	MPC · JPL
804995	2016 CW_{130}	—	February 5, 2016	Haleakala	Pan-STARRS 1	·	910 m	MPC · JPL
804996	2016 CA_{131}	—	November 8, 2010	Mount Lemmon	Mount Lemmon Survey	·	1 km	MPC · JPL
804997	2016 CE_{131}	—	February 5, 2016	Haleakala	Pan-STARRS 1	·	2.1 km	MPC · JPL
804998	2016 CZ_{132}	—	February 5, 2016	Haleakala	Pan-STARRS 1	·	1.3 km	MPC · JPL
804999	2016 CJ_{139}	—	February 6, 2016	Mount Lemmon	Mount Lemmon Survey	·	1.1 km	MPC · JPL
805000	2016 CD_{147}	—	January 16, 2016	Haleakala	Pan-STARRS 1	·	1.1 km	MPC · JPL

back to top
