= Kanmuri =

Kanmuri may refer to:

- Kanmuri (headwear), a type of cap worn by Shinto clergy and courtiers in Japan
- Mount Kanmuri (disambiguation), multiple mountains in Japan
- Tetsuya Kanmuri (冠 徹弥, born 1971), Japanese singer
