= Meanings of minor-planet names: 150001–151000 =

As minor planet discoveries are confirmed, they are given a permanent number by the IAU's Minor Planet Center (MPC), and the discoverers can then submit names for them, following the IAU's naming conventions. The list below concerns those minor planets in the specified number-range that have received names, and explains the meanings of those names.

Official naming citations of newly named small Solar System bodies are approved and published in a bulletin by IAU's Working Group for Small Bodies Nomenclature (WGSBN). Before May 2021, citations were published in MPC's Minor Planet Circulars for many decades. Recent citations can also be found on the JPL Small-Body Database (SBDB). Until his death in 2016, German astronomer Lutz D. Schmadel compiled these citations into the Dictionary of Minor Planet Names (DMP) and regularly updated the collection.

Based on Paul Herget's The Names of the Minor Planets, Schmadel also researched the unclear origin of numerous asteroids, most of which had been named prior to World War II. This article incorporates text from this source, which is in the public domain: SBDB New namings may only be added to this list below after official publication as the preannouncement of names is condemned. The WGSBN publishes a comprehensive guideline for the naming rules of non-cometary small Solar System bodies.

== 150001–150100 ==
Named minor planet	Provisional	This minor planet was named for...	Ref · Catalog
150035 Williamson	2005 WO	Bruce Williamson (born 1953), American senior technician and precision machinist at the NASA Table Mountain Facility	JPL · 150035
150046 Cynthiaconrad	2005 XK_{107}	Cynthia A. Conrad (born 1972) is a Senior Specialist at Southwest Research Institute. She served as the Pluto Encounter Logistics Lead for the New Horizons mission to Pluto.	JPL · 150046
150081 Steindl	2006 UH_{109}	Imre Steindl (1839–1902) was a Hungarian architect, full professor of the Budapest University of Technology, and a member of the Hungarian Academy of Sciences. His most famous work, the Hungarian Parliament Building, is regarded by many as a symbol of the capital city.	JPL · 150081

== 150101–150200 ==
back to top

Named minor planet	Provisional	This minor planet was named for...	Ref · Catalog
150118 Petersberg	1993 SZ_{2}	The Petersberg is a 250-m hill near of Halle (Saale), Germany. On the hill is an Abbey with its church St. Peter, formerly an Augustinian monastery. Since 1999 it has been an evangelical monastic community. The church served as a burial-place for members of the House Wettin, one of the oldest dynasties of German nobility.	JPL · 150118
150129 Besshi	1994 VK_{7}	Besshi copper mine (Besshi Dōzan), one of the richest copper mines in Japan	JPL · 150129
150145 Uvic	1996 BH_{1}	The University of Victoria ("UVic"), British Columbia, Canada, home to the Climenhaga Observatory (657), where this minor planet was discovered	JPL · 150145

== 150201–150300 ==
back to top

Named minor planet	Provisional	This minor planet was named for...	Ref · Catalog
There are no named minor planets in this number range

== 150301–150400 ==
back to top

Named minor planet	Provisional	This minor planet was named for...	Ref · Catalog
150316 Ivaniosifovich	1999 VO_{1}	Ivan Iosifovich Ipatov (1927–2015), father of the second discoverer, Sergei I. Ipatov, was one of the founders of the geodetical network of Russia.	IAU · 150316
150374 Jasoncook	2000 CW_{109}	Jason C. Cook (born 1977), an American scientist at the Southwest Research Institute who worked on the composition team for the New Horizons mission to Pluto.	JPL · 150374

== 150401–150500 ==
back to top

Named minor planet	Provisional	This minor planet was named for...	Ref · Catalog
There are no named minor planets in this number range

== 150501–150600 ==
back to top

Named minor planet	Provisional	This minor planet was named for...	Ref · Catalog
150520 Dong	2000 RF_{107}	Feng Dong (born 1979), Chinese-American astronomer with the Sloan Digital Sky Survey	JPL · 150520

== 150601–150700 ==
back to top

Named minor planet	Provisional	This minor planet was named for...	Ref · Catalog
There are no named minor planets in this number range

== 150701–150800 ==
back to top

Named minor planet	Provisional	This minor planet was named for...	Ref · Catalog
There are no named minor planets in this number range

== 150801–150900 ==
back to top

Named minor planet	Provisional	This minor planet was named for...	Ref · Catalog
There are no named minor planets in this number range

== 150901–151000 ==
back to top

Named minor planet	Provisional	This minor planet was named for...	Ref · Catalog
There are no named minor planets in this number range

back to top

Preceded by 149,001–150,000	Meanings of minor-planet names List of minor planets: 150,001–151,000	Succeeded by 151,001–152,000
