= List of minor planets: 150001–151000 =

The following is a partial list of minor planets, running from minor-planet number 150001 through 151000, inclusive. The primary data for this and other partial lists is based on JPL's "Small-Body Orbital Elements" and data available from the Minor Planet Center. Critical list information is also provided by the MPC, unless otherwise specified from Lowell Observatory. A detailed description of the table's columns and additional sources are given on the main page including a complete list of every page in this series, and a statistical break-up on the dynamical classification of minor planets.

Also see the summary list of all named bodies in numerical and alphabetical order, and the corresponding naming citations for the number range of this particular list. New namings may only be added to this list after official publication, as the preannouncement of names is condemned by the Working Group for Small Bodies Nomenclature of the International Astronomical Union.

Near-Earth obj.	MBA (inner)	MBA (outer)	Centaur
Mars-crosser	MBA (middle)	Jupiter trojan	Trans-Neptunian obj.
Unclassified

== 150001–150100 ==
Designation			Discovery			Properties		Ref
Permanent	Provisional	Named after	Date	Site	Discoverer(s)	Category	Diam.	Ref
150001	2005 UJ_{151}	—	October 26, 2005	Kitt Peak	Spacewatch	·	3.0 km	MPC · JPL
150002	2005 UZ_{155}	—	October 26, 2005	Palomar	NEAT	EOS	3.0 km	MPC · JPL
150003	2005 UH_{159}	—	October 31, 2005	Kitt Peak	Spacewatch	·	4.1 km	MPC · JPL
150004	2005 UG_{163}	—	October 23, 2005	Kitt Peak	Spacewatch	·	2.8 km	MPC · JPL
150005	2005 UG_{166}	—	October 24, 2005	Kitt Peak	Spacewatch	·	2.8 km	MPC · JPL
150006	2005 UO_{200}	—	October 25, 2005	Kitt Peak	Spacewatch	·	2.9 km	MPC · JPL
150007	2005 UD_{204}	—	October 25, 2005	Mount Lemmon	Mount Lemmon Survey	·	5.0 km	MPC · JPL
150008	2005 UD_{216}	—	October 25, 2005	Kitt Peak	Spacewatch	fast	4.4 km	MPC · JPL
150009	2005 UY_{216}	—	October 26, 2005	Kitt Peak	Spacewatch	KOR	1.7 km	MPC · JPL
150010	2005 UJ_{217}	—	October 27, 2005	Kitt Peak	Spacewatch	·	4.3 km	MPC · JPL
150011	2005 UO_{231}	—	October 25, 2005	Mount Lemmon	Mount Lemmon Survey	·	3.7 km	MPC · JPL
150012	2005 UQ_{241}	—	October 25, 2005	Kitt Peak	Spacewatch	·	2.9 km	MPC · JPL
150013	2005 UU_{254}	—	October 22, 2005	Palomar	NEAT	·	3.1 km	MPC · JPL
150014	2005 UC_{343}	—	October 31, 2005	Anderson Mesa	LONEOS	·	2.6 km	MPC · JPL
150015	2005 UD_{350}	—	October 27, 2005	Palomar	NEAT	EOS	5.7 km	MPC · JPL
150016	2005 UB_{353}	—	October 29, 2005	Catalina	CSS	EUN	2.7 km	MPC · JPL
150017	2005 UY_{382}	—	October 27, 2005	Anderson Mesa	LONEOS	·	4.9 km	MPC · JPL
150018	2005 UF_{386}	—	October 30, 2005	Socorro	LINEAR	·	4.2 km	MPC · JPL
150019	2005 UB_{398}	—	October 30, 2005	Socorro	LINEAR	WIT	1.7 km	MPC · JPL
150020	2005 UQ_{402}	—	October 28, 2005	Catalina	CSS	·	2.1 km	MPC · JPL
150021	2005 UB_{448}	—	October 30, 2005	Socorro	LINEAR	·	3.5 km	MPC · JPL
150022	2005 UB_{485}	—	October 22, 2005	Catalina	CSS	·	3.3 km	MPC · JPL
150023	2005 UK_{493}	—	October 25, 2005	Socorro	LINEAR	·	3.7 km	MPC · JPL
150024	2005 UM_{493}	—	October 25, 2005	Socorro	LINEAR	slow	3.4 km	MPC · JPL
150025	2005 VD_{6}	—	November 3, 2005	Kitt Peak	Spacewatch	·	1.5 km	MPC · JPL
150026	2005 VU_{6}	—	November 6, 2005	Catalina	CSS	·	3.6 km	MPC · JPL
150027	2005 VB_{13}	—	November 3, 2005	Mount Lemmon	Mount Lemmon Survey	·	4.3 km	MPC · JPL
150028	2005 VH_{33}	—	November 10, 2005	Catalina	CSS	·	3.8 km	MPC · JPL
150029	2005 VR_{34}	—	November 3, 2005	Catalina	CSS	PHO	2.8 km	MPC · JPL
150030	2005 VD_{60}	—	November 5, 2005	Socorro	LINEAR	·	6.3 km	MPC · JPL
150031	2005 VC_{97}	—	November 5, 2005	Kitt Peak	Spacewatch	(13314)	3.3 km	MPC · JPL
150032	2005 VE_{98}	—	November 7, 2005	Socorro	LINEAR	·	2.5 km	MPC · JPL
150033	2005 VQ_{106}	—	November 5, 2005	Kitt Peak	Spacewatch	3:2 · SHU	6.6 km	MPC · JPL
150034	2005 VZ_{115}	—	November 11, 2005	Kitt Peak	Spacewatch	HOF	3.8 km	MPC · JPL
150035 Williamson	2005 WO	Williamson	November 20, 2005	Wrightwood	J. W. Young	·	3.5 km	MPC · JPL
150036	2005 WD_{3}	—	November 20, 2005	Anderson Mesa	LONEOS	(5)	2.4 km	MPC · JPL
150037	2005 WX_{4}	—	November 19, 2005	Palomar	NEAT	·	6.8 km	MPC · JPL
150038	2005 WL_{19}	—	November 24, 2005	Palomar	NEAT	·	6.6 km	MPC · JPL
150039	2005 WZ_{159}	—	November 30, 2005	Catalina	CSS	·	3.8 km	MPC · JPL
150040	2005 WJ_{163}	—	November 29, 2005	Kitt Peak	Spacewatch	KOR	2.1 km	MPC · JPL
150041	2005 WO_{163}	—	November 29, 2005	Kitt Peak	Spacewatch	LIX	7.7 km	MPC · JPL
150042	2005 WK_{179}	—	November 21, 2005	Anderson Mesa	LONEOS	·	4.1 km	MPC · JPL
150043	2005 WA_{185}	—	November 29, 2005	Catalina	CSS	URS	7.0 km	MPC · JPL
150044	2005 WX_{187}	—	November 29, 2005	Catalina	CSS	EUN	3.5 km	MPC · JPL
150045	2005 WC_{194}	—	November 29, 2005	Palomar	NEAT	·	5.5 km	MPC · JPL
150046 Cynthiaconrad	2005 XK_{107}	Cynthiaconrad	December 1, 2005	Kitt Peak	M. W. Buie	·	3.1 km	MPC · JPL
150047	2005 YB_{17}	—	December 23, 2005	Kitt Peak	Spacewatch	·	2.3 km	MPC · JPL
150048	2005 YV_{94}	—	December 23, 2005	Socorro	LINEAR	EUN	2.6 km	MPC · JPL
150049	2006 OE_{1}	—	July 19, 2006	Hibiscus	S. F. Hönig	·	3.8 km	MPC · JPL
150050	2006 PT_{12}	—	August 13, 2006	Palomar	NEAT	KOR	2.2 km	MPC · JPL
150051	2006 QM_{10}	—	August 21, 2006	Hibiscus	S. F. Hönig	·	1.4 km	MPC · JPL
150052	2006 QO_{10}	—	August 21, 2006	Hibiscus	S. F. Hönig	AGN	1.7 km	MPC · JPL
150053	2006 QW_{54}	—	August 18, 2006	Anderson Mesa	LONEOS	MIS	3.5 km	MPC · JPL
150054	2006 QO_{62}	—	August 23, 2006	Socorro	LINEAR	NYS	1.5 km	MPC · JPL
150055	2006 QM_{113}	—	August 24, 2006	Socorro	LINEAR	·	1.7 km	MPC · JPL
150056	2006 QN_{137}	—	August 30, 2006	Hibiscus	S. F. Hönig	·	1.9 km	MPC · JPL
150057	2006 QT_{144}	—	August 28, 2006	Socorro	LINEAR	DOR	3.7 km	MPC · JPL
150058	2006 QJ_{147}	—	August 18, 2006	Kitt Peak	Spacewatch	·	2.0 km	MPC · JPL
150059	2006 QA_{169}	—	August 30, 2006	Anderson Mesa	LONEOS	·	3.0 km	MPC · JPL
150060	2006 RL_{4}	—	September 12, 2006	Catalina	CSS	·	1.1 km	MPC · JPL
150061	2006 RE_{10}	—	September 13, 2006	Palomar	NEAT	·	2.6 km	MPC · JPL
150062	2006 RN_{17}	—	September 14, 2006	Palomar	NEAT	·	3.9 km	MPC · JPL
150063	2006 RA_{40}	—	September 12, 2006	Catalina	CSS	NYS	1.5 km	MPC · JPL
150064	2006 RJ_{41}	—	September 14, 2006	Palomar	NEAT	·	2.8 km	MPC · JPL
150065	2006 RG_{48}	—	September 14, 2006	Catalina	CSS	GEF	1.7 km	MPC · JPL
150066	2006 SN_{7}	—	September 16, 2006	Catalina	CSS	·	6.7 km	MPC · JPL
150067	2006 SJ_{8}	—	September 16, 2006	Anderson Mesa	LONEOS	·	6.1 km	MPC · JPL
150068	2006 SK_{12}	—	September 16, 2006	Anderson Mesa	LONEOS	·	1.1 km	MPC · JPL
150069	2006 SW_{55}	—	September 18, 2006	Catalina	CSS	·	5.0 km	MPC · JPL
150070	2006 SJ_{61}	—	September 20, 2006	Anderson Mesa	LONEOS	·	4.8 km	MPC · JPL
150071	2006 SZ_{110}	—	September 21, 2006	Anderson Mesa	LONEOS	·	3.6 km	MPC · JPL
150072	2006 SL_{154}	—	September 20, 2006	Palomar	NEAT	V	1.1 km	MPC · JPL
150073	2006 SK_{181}	—	September 25, 2006	Mount Lemmon	Mount Lemmon Survey	MAS	1.4 km	MPC · JPL
150074	2006 SX_{191}	—	September 26, 2006	Mount Lemmon	Mount Lemmon Survey	V	820 m	MPC · JPL
150075	2006 SP_{223}	—	September 25, 2006	Kitt Peak	Spacewatch	CYB	5.9 km	MPC · JPL
150076	2006 ST_{282}	—	September 25, 2006	Anderson Mesa	LONEOS	·	1.7 km	MPC · JPL
150077	2006 SE_{356}	—	September 30, 2006	Catalina	CSS	·	2.2 km	MPC · JPL
150078	2006 TV_{42}	—	October 12, 2006	Kitt Peak	Spacewatch	·	4.6 km	MPC · JPL
150079	2006 TM_{71}	—	October 11, 2006	Palomar	NEAT	·	1.6 km	MPC · JPL
150080	2006 UV_{9}	—	October 16, 2006	Catalina	CSS	V	940 m	MPC · JPL
150081 Steindl	2006 UH_{109}	Steindl	October 19, 2006	Piszkéstető	K. Sárneczky	·	1.5 km	MPC · JPL
150082	2006 UZ_{255}	—	October 27, 2006	Kitt Peak	Spacewatch	(5)	2.4 km	MPC · JPL
150083	2006 VD_{71}	—	November 11, 2006	Palomar	NEAT	·	890 m	MPC · JPL
150084	2006 WN_{11}	—	November 16, 2006	Socorro	LINEAR	·	2.9 km	MPC · JPL
150085	2006 WQ_{14}	—	November 16, 2006	Mount Lemmon	Mount Lemmon Survey	·	1.2 km	MPC · JPL
150086	2006 WW_{61}	—	November 17, 2006	Socorro	LINEAR	·	3.4 km	MPC · JPL
150087	2006 WC_{175}	—	November 23, 2006	Kitt Peak	Spacewatch	KOR	1.8 km	MPC · JPL
150088	2006 XY_{16}	—	December 10, 2006	Kitt Peak	Spacewatch	·	2.4 km	MPC · JPL
150089	2006 XL_{30}	—	December 13, 2006	Kitt Peak	Spacewatch	·	3.0 km	MPC · JPL
150090	2006 XA_{61}	—	December 15, 2006	Socorro	LINEAR	·	2.1 km	MPC · JPL
150091	2006 YQ_{35}	—	December 21, 2006	Kitt Peak	Spacewatch	NYS	1.9 km	MPC · JPL
150092	4156 P-L	—	September 24, 1960	Palomar	C. J. van Houten, I. van Houten-Groeneveld, T. Gehrels	·	4.7 km	MPC · JPL
150093	4197 P-L	—	September 24, 1960	Palomar	C. J. van Houten, I. van Houten-Groeneveld, T. Gehrels	AEO	1.9 km	MPC · JPL
150094	6845 P-L	—	September 24, 1960	Palomar	C. J. van Houten, I. van Houten-Groeneveld, T. Gehrels	·	3.8 km	MPC · JPL
150095	1235 T-2	—	September 29, 1973	Palomar	C. J. van Houten, I. van Houten-Groeneveld, T. Gehrels	·	1.2 km	MPC · JPL
150096	3023 T-2	—	September 30, 1973	Palomar	C. J. van Houten, I. van Houten-Groeneveld, T. Gehrels	·	1.9 km	MPC · JPL
150097	4319 T-2	—	September 29, 1973	Palomar	C. J. van Houten, I. van Houten-Groeneveld, T. Gehrels	NYS	1.7 km	MPC · JPL
150098	5086 T-2	—	September 25, 1973	Palomar	C. J. van Houten, I. van Houten-Groeneveld, T. Gehrels	·	1.8 km	MPC · JPL
150099	1137 T-3	—	October 17, 1977	Palomar	C. J. van Houten, I. van Houten-Groeneveld, T. Gehrels	·	3.7 km	MPC · JPL
150100	1229 T-3	—	October 17, 1977	Palomar	C. J. van Houten, I. van Houten-Groeneveld, T. Gehrels	·	1.6 km	MPC · JPL

== 150101–150200 ==
back to top

Designation			Discovery			Properties		Ref
Permanent	Provisional	Named after	Date	Site	Discoverer(s)	Category	Diam.	Ref
150101	2428 T-3	—	October 16, 1977	Palomar	C. J. van Houten, I. van Houten-Groeneveld, T. Gehrels	·	4.0 km	MPC · JPL
150102	3503 T-3	—	October 16, 1977	Palomar	C. J. van Houten, I. van Houten-Groeneveld, T. Gehrels	·	3.0 km	MPC · JPL
150103	4262 T-3	—	October 16, 1977	Palomar	C. J. van Houten, I. van Houten-Groeneveld, T. Gehrels	(5)	2.0 km	MPC · JPL
150104	5007 T-3	—	October 16, 1977	Palomar	C. J. van Houten, I. van Houten-Groeneveld, T. Gehrels	·	3.1 km	MPC · JPL
150105	5062 T-3	—	October 16, 1977	Palomar	C. J. van Houten, I. van Houten-Groeneveld, T. Gehrels	DOR	3.9 km	MPC · JPL
150106	5084 T-3	—	October 16, 1977	Palomar	C. J. van Houten, I. van Houten-Groeneveld, T. Gehrels	ERI	2.1 km	MPC · JPL
150107	1978 VL_{4}	—	November 7, 1978	Palomar	E. F. Helin, S. J. Bus	·	1.2 km	MPC · JPL
150108	1979 QG_{3}	—	August 22, 1979	La Silla	C.-I. Lagerkvist	·	1.6 km	MPC · JPL
150109	1981 EA_{17}	—	March 6, 1981	Siding Spring	S. J. Bus	·	2.9 km	MPC · JPL
150110	1981 EA_{30}	—	March 2, 1981	Siding Spring	S. J. Bus	·	6.4 km	MPC · JPL
150111	1991 TK_{15}	—	October 6, 1991	Palomar	Lowe, A.	·	2.2 km	MPC · JPL
150112	1991 TY_{15}	—	October 6, 1991	Palomar	Lowe, A.	·	3.2 km	MPC · JPL
150113	1991 VX_{4}	—	November 4, 1991	Kushiro	S. Ueda, H. Kaneda	·	2.5 km	MPC · JPL
150114	1991 VA_{11}	—	November 5, 1991	Kitt Peak	Spacewatch	AGN	1.7 km	MPC · JPL
150115	1992 SB_{3}	—	September 24, 1992	Kitt Peak	Spacewatch	·	3.3 km	MPC · JPL
150116	1993 FE_{33}	—	March 19, 1993	La Silla	UESAC	NYS	1.4 km	MPC · JPL
150117	1993 FF_{43}	—	March 19, 1993	La Silla	UESAC	GEF	2.4 km	MPC · JPL
150118 Petersberg	1993 SZ_{2}	Petersberg	September 18, 1993	Tautenburg Observatory	F. Börngen, L. D. Schmadel	·	4.5 km	MPC · JPL
150119	1993 TM_{10}	—	October 13, 1993	Kitt Peak	Spacewatch	·	1.4 km	MPC · JPL
150120	1993 TS_{24}	—	October 9, 1993	La Silla	E. W. Elst	·	5.0 km	MPC · JPL
150121	1994 AB_{5}	—	January 5, 1994	Kitt Peak	Spacewatch	·	1.6 km	MPC · JPL
150122	1994 CC_{2}	—	February 12, 1994	Oizumi	T. Kobayashi	·	5.7 km	MPC · JPL
150123	1994 PY_{6}	—	August 10, 1994	La Silla	E. W. Elst	NYS	1.9 km	MPC · JPL
150124	1994 PU_{22}	—	August 12, 1994	La Silla	E. W. Elst	·	1.4 km	MPC · JPL
150125	1994 PQ_{29}	—	August 12, 1994	La Silla	E. W. Elst	·	1.6 km	MPC · JPL
150126	1994 SD_{8}	—	September 28, 1994	Kitt Peak	Spacewatch	MAS	950 m	MPC · JPL
150127	1994 SD_{9}	—	September 28, 1994	Kitt Peak	Spacewatch	·	2.2 km	MPC · JPL
150128	1994 UP_{7}	—	October 28, 1994	Kitt Peak	Spacewatch	·	3.8 km	MPC · JPL
150129 Besshi	1994 VK_{7}	Besshi	November 8, 1994	Kuma Kogen	A. Nakamura	·	1.6 km	MPC · JPL
150130	1995 AN_{2}	—	January 8, 1995	Kitt Peak	Spacewatch	·	1.7 km	MPC · JPL
150131	1995 BO_{7}	—	January 29, 1995	Kitt Peak	Spacewatch	·	3.5 km	MPC · JPL
150132	1995 DK_{9}	—	February 24, 1995	Kitt Peak	Spacewatch	·	1.2 km	MPC · JPL
150133	1995 OG_{16}	—	July 26, 1995	Kitt Peak	Spacewatch	·	3.1 km	MPC · JPL
150134	1995 SP_{48}	—	September 26, 1995	Kitt Peak	Spacewatch	KOR	2.0 km	MPC · JPL
150135	1995 UH_{8}	—	October 27, 1995	Oizumi	T. Kobayashi	·	1.3 km	MPC · JPL
150136	1995 VW_{4}	—	November 14, 1995	Kitt Peak	Spacewatch	·	1.1 km	MPC · JPL
150137	1995 VV_{14}	—	November 15, 1995	Kitt Peak	Spacewatch	EUP	7.0 km	MPC · JPL
150138	1995 WR_{1}	—	November 16, 1995	Kushiro	S. Ueda, H. Kaneda	PHO	5.8 km	MPC · JPL
150139	1995 WW_{38}	—	November 23, 1995	Kitt Peak	Spacewatch	·	2.0 km	MPC · JPL
150140	1995 YF_{6}	—	December 16, 1995	Kitt Peak	Spacewatch	·	5.1 km	MPC · JPL
150141	1995 YE_{7}	—	December 16, 1995	Kitt Peak	Spacewatch	·	1.5 km	MPC · JPL
150142	1995 YQ_{7}	—	December 16, 1995	Kitt Peak	Spacewatch	(1338) (FLO)	1.2 km	MPC · JPL
150143	1996 AC_{7}	—	January 12, 1996	Kitt Peak	Spacewatch	·	4.1 km	MPC · JPL
150144	1996 AV_{11}	—	January 14, 1996	Kitt Peak	Spacewatch	V	920 m	MPC · JPL
150145 Uvic	1996 BH_{1}	Uvic	January 23, 1996	NRC-DAO	D. D. Balam	·	7.5 km	MPC · JPL
150146	1996 ES_{9}	—	March 12, 1996	Kitt Peak	Spacewatch	THM	2.9 km	MPC · JPL
150147	1996 EO_{10}	—	March 12, 1996	Kitt Peak	Spacewatch	·	2.0 km	MPC · JPL
150148	1996 FX_{3}	—	March 20, 1996	Haleakala	AMOS	·	1.4 km	MPC · JPL
150149	1996 JF_{11}	—	May 15, 1996	Kitt Peak	Spacewatch	·	2.3 km	MPC · JPL
150150	1996 TV_{23}	—	October 6, 1996	Kitt Peak	Spacewatch	·	2.9 km	MPC · JPL
150151	1996 TY_{29}	—	October 7, 1996	Kitt Peak	Spacewatch	·	2.8 km	MPC · JPL
150152	1996 VL_{16}	—	November 5, 1996	Kitt Peak	Spacewatch	·	2.6 km	MPC · JPL
150153	1997 AB	—	January 1, 1997	Prescott	P. G. Comba	·	3.0 km	MPC · JPL
150154	1997 EG_{16}	—	March 5, 1997	Kitt Peak	Spacewatch	KOR	1.9 km	MPC · JPL
150155	1997 EJ_{32}	—	March 11, 1997	Kitt Peak	Spacewatch	·	2.9 km	MPC · JPL
150156	1997 EM_{32}	—	March 11, 1997	Kitt Peak	Spacewatch	·	1.1 km	MPC · JPL
150157	1997 GX_{25}	—	April 11, 1997	Ondřejov	P. Pravec	PHO	3.1 km	MPC · JPL
150158	1997 HG_{2}	—	April 29, 1997	Kitt Peak	Spacewatch	·	3.9 km	MPC · JPL
150159	1997 JW_{1}	—	May 1, 1997	Caussols	ODAS	slow	1.4 km	MPC · JPL
150160	1997 OF_{2}	—	July 30, 1997	Caussols	ODAS	(5)	2.5 km	MPC · JPL
150161	1997 PE_{5}	—	August 11, 1997	Xinglong	SCAP	NYS	2.5 km	MPC · JPL
150162	1997 SO	—	September 20, 1997	Ondřejov	L. Kotková	·	2.9 km	MPC · JPL
150163	1997 ST_{26}	—	September 29, 1997	Kitt Peak	Spacewatch	·	2.2 km	MPC · JPL
150164	1997 TP_{5}	—	October 2, 1997	Caussols	ODAS	·	1.5 km	MPC · JPL
150165	1997 UG_{9}	—	October 29, 1997	Haleakala	NEAT	·	1.7 km	MPC · JPL
150166	1997 WS_{1}	—	November 21, 1997	Xinglong	SCAP	·	1.7 km	MPC · JPL
150167	1997 XB_{1}	—	December 3, 1997	Oizumi	T. Kobayashi	·	1.5 km	MPC · JPL
150168	1998 BJ_{27}	—	January 22, 1998	Kitt Peak	Spacewatch	·	2.1 km	MPC · JPL
150169	1998 BG_{39}	—	January 29, 1998	Kitt Peak	Spacewatch	·	2.5 km	MPC · JPL
150170	1998 BW_{45}	—	January 25, 1998	Kitt Peak	Spacewatch	·	3.5 km	MPC · JPL
150171	1998 DV_{19}	—	February 26, 1998	Kitt Peak	Spacewatch	·	3.3 km	MPC · JPL
150172	1998 DV_{25}	—	February 23, 1998	Kitt Peak	Spacewatch	·	2.4 km	MPC · JPL
150173	1998 DO_{28}	—	February 26, 1998	Kitt Peak	Spacewatch	·	4.4 km	MPC · JPL
150174	1998 DU_{32}	—	February 25, 1998	Xinglong	SCAP	·	6.6 km	MPC · JPL
150175	1998 ED_{11}	—	March 1, 1998	La Silla	E. W. Elst	EUN	2.3 km	MPC · JPL
150176	1998 EL_{20}	—	March 3, 1998	La Silla	E. W. Elst	·	3.3 km	MPC · JPL
150177	1998 FR	—	March 18, 1998	Kitt Peak	Spacewatch	KOR	2.0 km	MPC · JPL
150178	1998 FX_{8}	—	March 22, 1998	Kitt Peak	Spacewatch	·	3.3 km	MPC · JPL
150179	1998 FN_{15}	—	March 27, 1998	Woomera	F. B. Zoltowski	·	3.6 km	MPC · JPL
150180	1998 FT_{15}	—	March 28, 1998	Caussols	ODAS	·	3.4 km	MPC · JPL
150181	1998 FR_{24}	—	March 20, 1998	Socorro	LINEAR	·	2.9 km	MPC · JPL
150182	1998 GM_{7}	—	April 2, 1998	Socorro	LINEAR	·	4.2 km	MPC · JPL
150183	1998 HL_{6}	—	April 21, 1998	Caussols	ODAS	·	3.7 km	MPC · JPL
150184	1998 HK_{28}	—	April 23, 1998	Kitt Peak	Spacewatch	DOR	4.0 km	MPC · JPL
150185	1998 HO_{144}	—	April 21, 1998	Socorro	LINEAR	THM	4.2 km	MPC · JPL
150186	1998 KF_{43}	—	May 28, 1998	Kitt Peak	Spacewatch	EOS	2.9 km	MPC · JPL
150187	1998 MH_{7}	—	June 21, 1998	Kitt Peak	Spacewatch	·	4.4 km	MPC · JPL
150188	1998 MT_{16}	—	June 27, 1998	Kitt Peak	Spacewatch	·	5.0 km	MPC · JPL
150189	1998 MV_{38}	—	June 26, 1998	La Silla	E. W. Elst	·	1.6 km	MPC · JPL
150190	1998 QB_{5}	—	August 22, 1998	Xinglong	SCAP	V	1.2 km	MPC · JPL
150191	1998 QL_{45}	—	August 17, 1998	Socorro	LINEAR	·	1.4 km	MPC · JPL
150192	1998 QY_{56}	—	August 30, 1998	Kitt Peak	Spacewatch	·	1.6 km	MPC · JPL
150193	1998 QG_{88}	—	August 24, 1998	Socorro	LINEAR	·	1.5 km	MPC · JPL
150194	1998 QB_{100}	—	August 26, 1998	La Silla	E. W. Elst	·	1.6 km	MPC · JPL
150195	1998 QT_{100}	—	August 26, 1998	La Silla	E. W. Elst	·	3.3 km	MPC · JPL
150196	1998 RA_{4}	—	September 14, 1998	Socorro	LINEAR	·	1.6 km	MPC · JPL
150197	1998 RS_{9}	—	September 13, 1998	Kitt Peak	Spacewatch	·	2.2 km	MPC · JPL
150198	1998 RE_{25}	—	September 14, 1998	Socorro	LINEAR	·	5.1 km	MPC · JPL
150199	1998 RX_{34}	—	September 14, 1998	Socorro	LINEAR	·	1.6 km	MPC · JPL
150200	1998 RR_{45}	—	September 14, 1998	Socorro	LINEAR	·	1.4 km	MPC · JPL

== 150201–150300 ==
back to top

Designation			Discovery			Properties		Ref
Permanent	Provisional	Named after	Date	Site	Discoverer(s)	Category	Diam.	Ref
150201	1998 RR_{50}	—	September 14, 1998	Socorro	LINEAR	TIR	6.6 km	MPC · JPL
150202	1998 RS_{56}	—	September 14, 1998	Socorro	LINEAR	·	1.5 km	MPC · JPL
150203	1998 RF_{57}	—	September 14, 1998	Socorro	LINEAR	·	900 m	MPC · JPL
150204	1998 RM_{64}	—	September 14, 1998	Socorro	LINEAR	·	1.3 km	MPC · JPL
150205	1998 RY_{76}	—	September 14, 1998	Socorro	LINEAR	·	2.0 km	MPC · JPL
150206	1998 SN_{9}	—	September 17, 1998	Xinglong	SCAP	NYS	1.6 km	MPC · JPL
150207	1998 SV_{18}	—	September 18, 1998	Kitt Peak	Spacewatch	V	1.2 km	MPC · JPL
150208	1998 SR_{50}	—	September 26, 1998	Kitt Peak	Spacewatch	NYS	1.9 km	MPC · JPL
150209	1998 SW_{51}	—	September 28, 1998	Kitt Peak	Spacewatch	·	2.4 km	MPC · JPL
150210	1998 ST_{55}	—	September 16, 1998	Anderson Mesa	LONEOS	NYS	1.6 km	MPC · JPL
150211	1998 SC_{76}	—	September 19, 1998	Socorro	LINEAR	·	4.9 km	MPC · JPL
150212	1998 SV_{79}	—	September 26, 1998	Socorro	LINEAR	THM	4.9 km	MPC · JPL
150213	1998 SS_{88}	—	September 26, 1998	Socorro	LINEAR	·	1.3 km	MPC · JPL
150214	1998 SF_{106}	—	September 26, 1998	Socorro	LINEAR	V	1.1 km	MPC · JPL
150215	1998 SP_{111}	—	September 26, 1998	Socorro	LINEAR	·	1.4 km	MPC · JPL
150216	1998 SY_{112}	—	September 26, 1998	Socorro	LINEAR	·	1.6 km	MPC · JPL
150217	1998 SP_{113}	—	September 26, 1998	Socorro	LINEAR	·	1.2 km	MPC · JPL
150218	1998 SN_{117}	—	September 26, 1998	Socorro	LINEAR	·	2.5 km	MPC · JPL
150219	1998 SW_{121}	—	September 26, 1998	Socorro	LINEAR	·	1.7 km	MPC · JPL
150220	1998 SS_{134}	—	September 26, 1998	Socorro	LINEAR	·	2.0 km	MPC · JPL
150221	1998 SX_{162}	—	September 26, 1998	Socorro	LINEAR	MAS	1.1 km	MPC · JPL
150222	1998 TA_{21}	—	October 13, 1998	Kitt Peak	Spacewatch	MAS	1.1 km	MPC · JPL
150223	1998 TT_{22}	—	October 13, 1998	Kitt Peak	Spacewatch	·	2.9 km	MPC · JPL
150224	1998 UE_{1}	—	October 19, 1998	Catalina	CSS	H	840 m	MPC · JPL
150225	1998 UG_{21}	—	October 28, 1998	Dossobuono	Lai, L.	·	2.3 km	MPC · JPL
150226	1998 UP_{40}	—	October 28, 1998	Socorro	LINEAR	·	2.3 km	MPC · JPL
150227	1998 UT_{41}	—	October 28, 1998	Socorro	LINEAR	·	1.9 km	MPC · JPL
150228	1998 VN_{3}	—	November 10, 1998	Caussols	ODAS	·	2.4 km	MPC · JPL
150229	1998 VJ_{22}	—	November 10, 1998	Socorro	LINEAR	·	1.5 km	MPC · JPL
150230	1998 VW_{28}	—	November 10, 1998	Socorro	LINEAR	·	3.5 km	MPC · JPL
150231	1998 WV_{28}	—	November 23, 1998	Kitt Peak	Spacewatch	(5)	3.1 km	MPC · JPL
150232	1998 XO_{1}	—	December 7, 1998	Caussols	ODAS	NYS	1.8 km	MPC · JPL
150233	1998 XM_{8}	—	December 10, 1998	Kitt Peak	Spacewatch	NYS	2.0 km	MPC · JPL
150234	1998 XW_{13}	—	December 15, 1998	Caussols	ODAS	·	1.5 km	MPC · JPL
150235	1998 XO_{18}	—	December 8, 1998	Kitt Peak	Spacewatch	·	1.9 km	MPC · JPL
150236	1998 XV_{19}	—	December 10, 1998	Kitt Peak	Spacewatch	slow	1.9 km	MPC · JPL
150237	1998 XD_{23}	—	December 11, 1998	Kitt Peak	Spacewatch	V	1.2 km	MPC · JPL
150238	1998 YG_{9}	—	December 23, 1998	San Marcello	L. Tesi, A. Boattini	MAS	1.2 km	MPC · JPL
150239	1999 AN_{11}	—	January 7, 1999	Kitt Peak	Spacewatch	·	2.2 km	MPC · JPL
150240	1999 CQ_{10}	—	February 12, 1999	Socorro	LINEAR	H	970 m	MPC · JPL
150241	1999 CK_{39}	—	February 10, 1999	Socorro	LINEAR	·	3.7 km	MPC · JPL
150242	1999 CD_{99}	—	February 10, 1999	Socorro	LINEAR	·	2.9 km	MPC · JPL
150243	1999 CH_{133}	—	February 7, 1999	Kitt Peak	Spacewatch	·	2.0 km	MPC · JPL
150244	1999 CZ_{150}	—	February 9, 1999	Kitt Peak	Spacewatch	·	1.5 km	MPC · JPL
150245	1999 FY_{7}	—	March 20, 1999	Socorro	LINEAR	H	1.3 km	MPC · JPL
150246	1999 GV_{1}	—	April 6, 1999	Kitt Peak	Spacewatch	·	1.9 km	MPC · JPL
150247	1999 JK_{30}	—	May 10, 1999	Socorro	LINEAR	·	2.7 km	MPC · JPL
150248	1999 JK_{59}	—	May 10, 1999	Socorro	LINEAR	·	2.8 km	MPC · JPL
150249	1999 JY_{82}	—	May 12, 1999	Socorro	LINEAR	·	3.0 km	MPC · JPL
150250	1999 JC_{99}	—	May 12, 1999	Socorro	LINEAR	·	4.3 km	MPC · JPL
150251	1999 JR_{99}	—	May 12, 1999	Socorro	LINEAR	·	3.5 km	MPC · JPL
150252	1999 LJ_{5}	—	June 11, 1999	Socorro	LINEAR	H	1.1 km	MPC · JPL
150253	1999 LQ_{8}	—	June 8, 1999	Socorro	LINEAR	EUN	3.7 km	MPC · JPL
150254	1999 LB_{31}	—	June 14, 1999	Kitt Peak	Spacewatch	EUN	2.1 km	MPC · JPL
150255	1999 NH_{2}	—	July 12, 1999	Socorro	LINEAR	EUN	2.3 km	MPC · JPL
150256	1999 PN_{7}	—	August 3, 1999	Kitt Peak	Spacewatch	·	3.6 km	MPC · JPL
150257	1999 RO_{7}	—	September 3, 1999	Kitt Peak	Spacewatch	·	1.7 km	MPC · JPL
150258	1999 RV_{18}	—	September 7, 1999	Socorro	LINEAR	·	3.2 km	MPC · JPL
150259	1999 RD_{30}	—	September 8, 1999	Socorro	LINEAR	·	4.7 km	MPC · JPL
150260	1999 RV_{67}	—	September 7, 1999	Socorro	LINEAR	·	3.0 km	MPC · JPL
150261	1999 RC_{68}	—	September 7, 1999	Socorro	LINEAR	·	5.5 km	MPC · JPL
150262	1999 RN_{101}	—	September 13, 1999	Kitt Peak	Spacewatch	KOR	1.9 km	MPC · JPL
150263	1999 RQ_{108}	—	September 8, 1999	Socorro	LINEAR	·	3.5 km	MPC · JPL
150264	1999 RS_{108}	—	September 8, 1999	Socorro	LINEAR	CYB	7.3 km	MPC · JPL
150265	1999 RW_{116}	—	September 9, 1999	Socorro	LINEAR	·	4.0 km	MPC · JPL
150266	1999 RZ_{137}	—	September 9, 1999	Socorro	LINEAR	·	5.6 km	MPC · JPL
150267	1999 RP_{139}	—	September 9, 1999	Socorro	LINEAR	EUP	7.0 km	MPC · JPL
150268	1999 RB_{162}	—	September 9, 1999	Socorro	LINEAR	·	2.9 km	MPC · JPL
150269	1999 RB_{187}	—	September 9, 1999	Socorro	LINEAR	·	3.0 km	MPC · JPL
150270	1999 RV_{187}	—	September 14, 1999	Kitt Peak	Spacewatch	·	2.4 km	MPC · JPL
150271	1999 RO_{202}	—	September 8, 1999	Socorro	LINEAR	·	5.9 km	MPC · JPL
150272	1999 RY_{204}	—	September 8, 1999	Socorro	LINEAR	·	11 km	MPC · JPL
150273	1999 RA_{233}	—	September 8, 1999	Catalina	CSS	·	3.5 km	MPC · JPL
150274	1999 SS	—	September 16, 1999	Kitt Peak	Spacewatch	fast	6.1 km	MPC · JPL
150275	1999 TR_{16}	—	October 14, 1999	Ondřejov	L. Kotková	·	950 m	MPC · JPL
150276	1999 TH_{38}	—	October 1, 1999	Catalina	CSS	·	4.2 km	MPC · JPL
150277	1999 TJ_{45}	—	October 3, 1999	Kitt Peak	Spacewatch	·	5.2 km	MPC · JPL
150278	1999 TP_{48}	—	October 4, 1999	Kitt Peak	Spacewatch	·	3.7 km	MPC · JPL
150279	1999 TG_{49}	—	October 4, 1999	Kitt Peak	Spacewatch	THM	4.0 km	MPC · JPL
150280	1999 TO_{57}	—	October 6, 1999	Kitt Peak	Spacewatch	THM	4.4 km	MPC · JPL
150281	1999 TT_{58}	—	October 6, 1999	Kitt Peak	Spacewatch	·	4.9 km	MPC · JPL
150282	1999 TK_{73}	—	October 10, 1999	Kitt Peak	Spacewatch	EOS	2.8 km	MPC · JPL
150283	1999 TL_{81}	—	October 12, 1999	Kitt Peak	Spacewatch	·	3.4 km	MPC · JPL
150284	1999 TV_{89}	—	October 2, 1999	Socorro	LINEAR	·	1.5 km	MPC · JPL
150285	1999 TV_{94}	—	October 2, 1999	Socorro	LINEAR	EOS	3.6 km	MPC · JPL
150286	1999 TA_{96}	—	October 2, 1999	Socorro	LINEAR	·	4.0 km	MPC · JPL
150287	1999 TB_{113}	—	October 4, 1999	Socorro	LINEAR	·	6.2 km	MPC · JPL
150288	1999 TS_{116}	—	October 4, 1999	Socorro	LINEAR	·	4.6 km	MPC · JPL
150289	1999 TX_{143}	—	October 7, 1999	Socorro	LINEAR	HYG	4.6 km	MPC · JPL
150290	1999 TT_{150}	—	October 7, 1999	Socorro	LINEAR	VER	6.5 km	MPC · JPL
150291	1999 TH_{158}	—	October 7, 1999	Socorro	LINEAR	·	1.3 km	MPC · JPL
150292	1999 TJ_{162}	—	October 9, 1999	Socorro	LINEAR	·	1.1 km	MPC · JPL
150293	1999 TV_{167}	—	October 10, 1999	Socorro	LINEAR	·	1.1 km	MPC · JPL
150294	1999 TN_{179}	—	October 10, 1999	Socorro	LINEAR	HYG	4.8 km	MPC · JPL
150295	1999 TJ_{187}	—	October 12, 1999	Socorro	LINEAR	·	3.7 km	MPC · JPL
150296	1999 TR_{200}	—	October 13, 1999	Socorro	LINEAR	·	3.9 km	MPC · JPL
150297	1999 TN_{212}	—	October 15, 1999	Socorro	LINEAR	·	6.9 km	MPC · JPL
150298	1999 TH_{213}	—	October 15, 1999	Socorro	LINEAR	EOS	3.2 km	MPC · JPL
150299	1999 TU_{214}	—	October 15, 1999	Socorro	LINEAR	·	4.3 km	MPC · JPL
150300	1999 TZ_{228}	—	October 3, 1999	Kitt Peak	Spacewatch	·	3.8 km	MPC · JPL

== 150301–150400 ==
back to top

Designation			Discovery			Properties		Ref
Permanent	Provisional	Named after	Date	Site	Discoverer(s)	Category	Diam.	Ref
150301	1999 TD_{234}	—	October 3, 1999	Socorro	LINEAR	·	5.0 km	MPC · JPL
150302	1999 TX_{234}	—	October 3, 1999	Catalina	CSS	·	4.9 km	MPC · JPL
150303	1999 TV_{250}	—	October 9, 1999	Catalina	CSS	·	3.8 km	MPC · JPL
150304	1999 TO_{259}	—	October 9, 1999	Socorro	LINEAR	·	4.6 km	MPC · JPL
150305	1999 TH_{279}	—	October 7, 1999	Socorro	LINEAR	·	5.6 km	MPC · JPL
150306	1999 TJ_{295}	—	October 1, 1999	Catalina	CSS	·	3.8 km	MPC · JPL
150307	1999 TR_{303}	—	October 4, 1999	Kitt Peak	Spacewatch	·	2.6 km	MPC · JPL
150308	1999 TQ_{320}	—	October 10, 1999	Socorro	LINEAR	·	1.1 km	MPC · JPL
150309	1999 US_{2}	—	October 19, 1999	Ondřejov	P. Pravec, P. Kušnirák	·	850 m	MPC · JPL
150310	1999 UF_{12}	—	October 31, 1999	Kitt Peak	Spacewatch	·	7.5 km	MPC · JPL
150311	1999 UN_{19}	—	October 30, 1999	Kitt Peak	Spacewatch	·	1.1 km	MPC · JPL
150312	1999 UR_{28}	—	October 31, 1999	Kitt Peak	Spacewatch	·	3.7 km	MPC · JPL
150313	1999 UB_{34}	—	October 31, 1999	Kitt Peak	Spacewatch	·	950 m	MPC · JPL
150314	1999 UQ_{54}	—	October 19, 1999	Kitt Peak	Spacewatch	·	3.3 km	MPC · JPL
150315	1999 UB_{58}	—	October 30, 1999	Kitt Peak	Spacewatch	·	3.3 km	MPC · JPL
150316 Ivaniosifovich	1999 VO_{1}	Ivaniosifovich	November 1, 1999	Uccle	E. W. Elst, Ipatov, S. I.	·	1.4 km	MPC · JPL
150317	1999 VQ_{40}	—	November 1, 1999	Kitt Peak	Spacewatch	·	1.3 km	MPC · JPL
150318	1999 VB_{43}	—	November 4, 1999	Kitt Peak	Spacewatch	THM	4.6 km	MPC · JPL
150319	1999 VA_{57}	—	November 4, 1999	Socorro	LINEAR	·	1.2 km	MPC · JPL
150320	1999 VQ_{64}	—	November 4, 1999	Socorro	LINEAR	VER	7.8 km	MPC · JPL
150321	1999 VN_{83}	—	November 2, 1999	Kitt Peak	Spacewatch	HYG	4.6 km	MPC · JPL
150322	1999 VQ_{84}	—	November 6, 1999	Kitt Peak	Spacewatch	THM	3.3 km	MPC · JPL
150323	1999 VV_{99}	—	November 9, 1999	Socorro	LINEAR	·	1.1 km	MPC · JPL
150324	1999 VM_{107}	—	November 9, 1999	Socorro	LINEAR	·	3.8 km	MPC · JPL
150325	1999 VD_{112}	—	November 9, 1999	Socorro	LINEAR	·	1.2 km	MPC · JPL
150326	1999 VO_{134}	—	November 10, 1999	Kitt Peak	Spacewatch	·	1.4 km	MPC · JPL
150327	1999 VY_{139}	—	November 10, 1999	Kitt Peak	Spacewatch	·	4.4 km	MPC · JPL
150328	1999 VU_{142}	—	November 13, 1999	Kitt Peak	Spacewatch	·	4.6 km	MPC · JPL
150329	1999 VZ_{173}	—	November 1, 1999	Anderson Mesa	LONEOS	·	1.3 km	MPC · JPL
150330	1999 VZ_{177}	—	November 6, 1999	Socorro	LINEAR	EOS	4.2 km	MPC · JPL
150331	1999 VG_{180}	—	November 5, 1999	Socorro	LINEAR	·	950 m	MPC · JPL
150332	1999 VR_{183}	—	November 12, 1999	Socorro	LINEAR	·	840 m	MPC · JPL
150333	1999 VD_{189}	—	November 15, 1999	Socorro	LINEAR	THM	4.9 km	MPC · JPL
150334	1999 VQ_{195}	—	November 3, 1999	Catalina	CSS	THM	4.5 km	MPC · JPL
150335	1999 VD_{221}	—	November 4, 1999	Kitt Peak	Spacewatch	·	3.6 km	MPC · JPL
150336	1999 WV_{10}	—	November 28, 1999	Kitt Peak	Spacewatch	·	1.5 km	MPC · JPL
150337	1999 WN_{12}	—	November 29, 1999	Kitt Peak	Spacewatch	·	4.3 km	MPC · JPL
150338	1999 XL_{15}	—	December 5, 1999	Višnjan Observatory	K. Korlević	·	1.7 km	MPC · JPL
150339	1999 XX_{27}	—	December 6, 1999	Socorro	LINEAR	·	9.0 km	MPC · JPL
150340	1999 XH_{31}	—	December 6, 1999	Socorro	LINEAR	·	1.7 km	MPC · JPL
150341	1999 XD_{61}	—	December 7, 1999	Socorro	LINEAR	·	1.8 km	MPC · JPL
150342	1999 XJ_{89}	—	December 7, 1999	Socorro	LINEAR	·	1.5 km	MPC · JPL
150343	1999 XS_{99}	—	December 7, 1999	Socorro	LINEAR	·	1.7 km	MPC · JPL
150344	1999 XO_{107}	—	December 4, 1999	Catalina	CSS	PHO	1.9 km	MPC · JPL
150345	1999 XQ_{187}	—	December 12, 1999	Socorro	LINEAR	·	1.3 km	MPC · JPL
150346	1999 YX_{4}	—	December 28, 1999	Prescott	P. G. Comba	·	1.3 km	MPC · JPL
150347	1999 YZ_{7}	—	December 27, 1999	Kitt Peak	Spacewatch	·	1.2 km	MPC · JPL
150348	1999 YU_{12}	—	December 31, 1999	Kitt Peak	Spacewatch	·	920 m	MPC · JPL
150349	1999 YB_{24}	—	December 16, 1999	Kitt Peak	Spacewatch	·	1.5 km	MPC · JPL
150350	2000 AD_{7}	—	January 2, 2000	Socorro	LINEAR	·	2.1 km	MPC · JPL
150351	2000 AK_{11}	—	January 3, 2000	Socorro	LINEAR	·	1.4 km	MPC · JPL
150352	2000 AF_{12}	—	January 3, 2000	Socorro	LINEAR	·	1.2 km	MPC · JPL
150353	2000 AL_{22}	—	January 3, 2000	Socorro	LINEAR	·	1.1 km	MPC · JPL
150354	2000 AQ_{39}	—	January 3, 2000	Socorro	LINEAR	·	2.0 km	MPC · JPL
150355	2000 AU_{56}	—	January 4, 2000	Socorro	LINEAR	V	930 m	MPC · JPL
150356	2000 AY_{130}	—	January 6, 2000	Socorro	LINEAR	(2076)	1.0 km	MPC · JPL
150357	2000 AL_{160}	—	January 3, 2000	Socorro	LINEAR	·	1.9 km	MPC · JPL
150358	2000 AZ_{208}	—	January 4, 2000	Kitt Peak	Spacewatch	(2076)	1.6 km	MPC · JPL
150359	2000 AO_{229}	—	January 3, 2000	Kitt Peak	Spacewatch	·	1.4 km	MPC · JPL
150360	2000 BE_{10}	—	January 26, 2000	Kitt Peak	Spacewatch	·	2.4 km	MPC · JPL
150361	2000 BZ_{20}	—	January 29, 2000	Kitt Peak	Spacewatch	·	1.8 km	MPC · JPL
150362	2000 BB_{21}	—	January 29, 2000	Kitt Peak	Spacewatch	(5)	1.5 km	MPC · JPL
150363	2000 BB_{22}	—	January 29, 2000	Kitt Peak	Spacewatch	V	1.0 km	MPC · JPL
150364	2000 CN_{9}	—	February 2, 2000	Socorro	LINEAR	·	1.7 km	MPC · JPL
150365	2000 CF_{11}	—	February 2, 2000	Socorro	LINEAR	·	1.3 km	MPC · JPL
150366	2000 CE_{17}	—	February 2, 2000	Socorro	LINEAR	·	1.8 km	MPC · JPL
150367	2000 CF_{19}	—	February 2, 2000	Socorro	LINEAR	·	1.5 km	MPC · JPL
150368	2000 CO_{22}	—	February 2, 2000	Socorro	LINEAR	·	1.2 km	MPC · JPL
150369	2000 CB_{64}	—	February 2, 2000	Socorro	LINEAR	PHO	2.3 km	MPC · JPL
150370	2000 CG_{65}	—	February 3, 2000	Socorro	LINEAR	·	2.8 km	MPC · JPL
150371	2000 CC_{72}	—	February 7, 2000	Kitt Peak	Spacewatch	·	1.6 km	MPC · JPL
150372	2000 CF_{76}	—	February 5, 2000	Višnjan Observatory	K. Korlević	·	1.4 km	MPC · JPL
150373	2000 CG_{78}	—	February 7, 2000	Kitt Peak	Spacewatch	·	1.5 km	MPC · JPL
150374 Jasoncook	2000 CW_{109}	Jasoncook	February 5, 2000	Kitt Peak	M. W. Buie	MAS	970 m	MPC · JPL
150375	2000 CG_{118}	—	February 3, 2000	Socorro	LINEAR	·	1.3 km	MPC · JPL
150376	2000 DG_{4}	—	February 28, 2000	Socorro	LINEAR	·	1.3 km	MPC · JPL
150377	2000 DO_{14}	—	February 25, 2000	Catalina	CSS	·	1.5 km	MPC · JPL
150378	2000 DK_{26}	—	February 29, 2000	Socorro	LINEAR	·	1.8 km	MPC · JPL
150379	2000 DL_{28}	—	February 29, 2000	Socorro	LINEAR	·	1.6 km	MPC · JPL
150380	2000 DE_{33}	—	February 29, 2000	Socorro	LINEAR	·	1.2 km	MPC · JPL
150381	2000 DC_{37}	—	February 29, 2000	Socorro	LINEAR	·	1.3 km	MPC · JPL
150382	2000 DK_{48}	—	February 29, 2000	Socorro	LINEAR	(2076) · fast	1.2 km	MPC · JPL
150383	2000 DX_{50}	—	February 29, 2000	Socorro	LINEAR	·	1.3 km	MPC · JPL
150384	2000 DN_{59}	—	February 29, 2000	Socorro	LINEAR	·	1.1 km	MPC · JPL
150385	2000 DS_{63}	—	February 29, 2000	Socorro	LINEAR	·	2.0 km	MPC · JPL
150386	2000 DP_{64}	—	February 29, 2000	Socorro	LINEAR	V	1.2 km	MPC · JPL
150387	2000 DH_{77}	—	February 29, 2000	Socorro	LINEAR	·	2.1 km	MPC · JPL
150388	2000 DV_{77}	—	February 29, 2000	Socorro	LINEAR	V	1.2 km	MPC · JPL
150389	2000 DZ_{81}	—	February 28, 2000	Socorro	LINEAR	·	2.3 km	MPC · JPL
150390	2000 DZ_{89}	—	February 27, 2000	Kitt Peak	Spacewatch	·	1.4 km	MPC · JPL
150391	2000 DP_{94}	—	February 28, 2000	Socorro	LINEAR	NYS	1.7 km	MPC · JPL
150392	2000 DG_{97}	—	February 29, 2000	Socorro	LINEAR	·	1.4 km	MPC · JPL
150393	2000 EN	—	March 2, 2000	Prescott	P. G. Comba	·	2.2 km	MPC · JPL
150394	2000 EF_{6}	—	March 2, 2000	Kitt Peak	Spacewatch	·	2.3 km	MPC · JPL
150395	2000 ES_{11}	—	March 4, 2000	Socorro	LINEAR	ERI	2.5 km	MPC · JPL
150396	2000 EP_{14}	—	March 5, 2000	Višnjan Observatory	K. Korlević	·	2.2 km	MPC · JPL
150397	2000 EH_{40}	—	March 8, 2000	Socorro	LINEAR	·	1.7 km	MPC · JPL
150398	2000 EC_{59}	—	March 9, 2000	Socorro	LINEAR	NYS	1.8 km	MPC · JPL
150399	2000 EO_{62}	—	March 10, 2000	Socorro	LINEAR	·	1.5 km	MPC · JPL
150400	2000 ES_{71}	—	March 9, 2000	Kitt Peak	Spacewatch	·	1.3 km	MPC · JPL

== 150401–150500 ==
back to top

Designation			Discovery			Properties		Ref
Permanent	Provisional	Named after	Date	Site	Discoverer(s)	Category	Diam.	Ref
150401	2000 EZ_{74}	—	March 11, 2000	Kitt Peak	Spacewatch	V	1.0 km	MPC · JPL
150402	2000 EM_{75}	—	March 10, 2000	Višnjan Observatory	K. Korlević	·	1.2 km	MPC · JPL
150403	2000 EV_{100}	—	March 12, 2000	Kitt Peak	Spacewatch	·	2.5 km	MPC · JPL
150404	2000 EK_{129}	—	March 11, 2000	Anderson Mesa	LONEOS	·	2.4 km	MPC · JPL
150405	2000 EN_{132}	—	March 11, 2000	Socorro	LINEAR	·	1.3 km	MPC · JPL
150406	2000 EW_{136}	—	March 12, 2000	Socorro	LINEAR	PHO	1.9 km	MPC · JPL
150407	2000 EH_{151}	—	March 5, 2000	Haleakala	NEAT	PHO	2.1 km	MPC · JPL
150408	2000 EZ_{157}	—	March 12, 2000	Anderson Mesa	LONEOS	·	3.1 km	MPC · JPL
150409	2000 EV_{172}	—	March 1, 2000	Kitt Peak	Spacewatch	·	1.4 km	MPC · JPL
150410	2000 ES_{196}	—	March 3, 2000	Socorro	LINEAR	V	1.0 km	MPC · JPL
150411	2000 FW_{6}	—	March 29, 2000	Kitt Peak	Spacewatch	NYS	950 m	MPC · JPL
150412	2000 FT_{18}	—	March 29, 2000	Socorro	LINEAR	·	1.6 km	MPC · JPL
150413	2000 FN_{21}	—	March 29, 2000	Socorro	LINEAR	·	1.9 km	MPC · JPL
150414	2000 FA_{23}	—	March 29, 2000	Socorro	LINEAR	PHO	2.5 km	MPC · JPL
150415	2000 FR_{27}	—	March 27, 2000	Anderson Mesa	LONEOS	·	3.1 km	MPC · JPL
150416	2000 FU_{52}	—	March 29, 2000	Kitt Peak	Spacewatch	3:2	8.9 km	MPC · JPL
150417	2000 FX_{56}	—	March 29, 2000	Socorro	LINEAR	·	2.3 km	MPC · JPL
150418	2000 FK_{64}	—	March 29, 2000	Socorro	LINEAR	NYS	1.8 km	MPC · JPL
150419	2000 GX	—	April 2, 2000	Kitt Peak	Spacewatch	·	2.1 km	MPC · JPL
150420	2000 GH_{6}	—	April 4, 2000	Socorro	LINEAR	·	3.7 km	MPC · JPL
150421	2000 GA_{14}	—	April 5, 2000	Socorro	LINEAR	NYS	1.5 km	MPC · JPL
150422	2000 GC_{15}	—	April 5, 2000	Socorro	LINEAR	V	940 m	MPC · JPL
150423	2000 GN_{17}	—	April 5, 2000	Socorro	LINEAR	MAS	1.2 km	MPC · JPL
150424	2000 GA_{18}	—	April 5, 2000	Socorro	LINEAR	·	2.0 km	MPC · JPL
150425	2000 GB_{35}	—	April 5, 2000	Socorro	LINEAR	·	3.0 km	MPC · JPL
150426	2000 GR_{40}	—	April 5, 2000	Socorro	LINEAR	·	3.0 km	MPC · JPL
150427	2000 GK_{41}	—	April 5, 2000	Socorro	LINEAR	·	1.6 km	MPC · JPL
150428	2000 GL_{46}	—	April 5, 2000	Socorro	LINEAR	MAS	1.1 km	MPC · JPL
150429	2000 GR_{46}	—	April 5, 2000	Socorro	LINEAR	·	1.2 km	MPC · JPL
150430	2000 GG_{49}	—	April 5, 2000	Socorro	LINEAR	MAS	1.7 km	MPC · JPL
150431	2000 GZ_{49}	—	April 5, 2000	Socorro	LINEAR	NYS ·	4.0 km	MPC · JPL
150432	2000 GV_{56}	—	April 5, 2000	Socorro	LINEAR	·	3.5 km	MPC · JPL
150433	2000 GY_{75}	—	April 5, 2000	Socorro	LINEAR	·	1.9 km	MPC · JPL
150434	2000 GV_{83}	—	April 3, 2000	Socorro	LINEAR	·	1.6 km	MPC · JPL
150435	2000 GT_{98}	—	April 7, 2000	Socorro	LINEAR	·	2.4 km	MPC · JPL
150436	2000 GE_{99}	—	April 7, 2000	Socorro	LINEAR	·	2.7 km	MPC · JPL
150437	2000 GM_{101}	—	April 7, 2000	Socorro	LINEAR	·	2.1 km	MPC · JPL
150438	2000 GG_{117}	—	April 2, 2000	Kitt Peak	Spacewatch	fast	1.2 km	MPC · JPL
150439	2000 GZ_{117}	—	April 2, 2000	Kitt Peak	Spacewatch	NYS	1.5 km	MPC · JPL
150440	2000 GR_{118}	—	April 3, 2000	Kitt Peak	Spacewatch	NYS	1.4 km	MPC · JPL
150441	2000 GU_{118}	—	April 3, 2000	Kitt Peak	Spacewatch	NYS	1.1 km	MPC · JPL
150442	2000 GN_{127}	—	April 10, 2000	Haleakala	NEAT	PHO	3.5 km	MPC · JPL
150443	2000 GT_{139}	—	April 4, 2000	Anderson Mesa	LONEOS	·	2.1 km	MPC · JPL
150444	2000 GH_{146}	—	April 12, 2000	Kitt Peak	Spacewatch	V	1.1 km	MPC · JPL
150445	2000 GD_{161}	—	April 7, 2000	Anderson Mesa	LONEOS	·	2.3 km	MPC · JPL
150446	2000 GM_{164}	—	April 5, 2000	Socorro	LINEAR	·	2.1 km	MPC · JPL
150447	2000 GD_{173}	—	April 3, 2000	Socorro	LINEAR	·	1.7 km	MPC · JPL
150448	2000 GJ_{176}	—	April 2, 2000	Kitt Peak	Spacewatch	MAS	940 m	MPC · JPL
150449	2000 HF_{1}	—	April 24, 2000	Kitt Peak	Spacewatch	NYS	1.5 km	MPC · JPL
150450	2000 HK_{2}	—	April 25, 2000	Kitt Peak	Spacewatch	·	2.3 km	MPC · JPL
150451	2000 HC_{10}	—	April 27, 2000	Socorro	LINEAR	·	2.1 km	MPC · JPL
150452	2000 HM_{39}	—	April 29, 2000	Kitt Peak	Spacewatch	·	1.8 km	MPC · JPL
150453	2000 HH_{46}	—	April 29, 2000	Socorro	LINEAR	NYS	1.9 km	MPC · JPL
150454	2000 HX_{52}	—	April 29, 2000	Socorro	LINEAR	·	3.9 km	MPC · JPL
150455	2000 HC_{54}	—	April 29, 2000	Socorro	LINEAR	·	1.8 km	MPC · JPL
150456	2000 HX_{55}	—	April 24, 2000	Anderson Mesa	LONEOS	NYS	1.6 km	MPC · JPL
150457	2000 HG_{66}	—	April 26, 2000	Anderson Mesa	LONEOS	·	1.9 km	MPC · JPL
150458	2000 HR_{68}	—	April 28, 2000	Kitt Peak	Spacewatch	·	1.6 km	MPC · JPL
150459	2000 HO_{82}	—	April 29, 2000	Socorro	LINEAR	·	2.2 km	MPC · JPL
150460	2000 HG_{88}	—	April 27, 2000	Socorro	LINEAR	·	2.1 km	MPC · JPL
150461	2000 HY_{89}	—	April 29, 2000	Socorro	LINEAR	MAS	1.1 km	MPC · JPL
150462	2000 JX_{1}	—	May 2, 2000	Socorro	LINEAR	V	1.2 km	MPC · JPL
150463	2000 JA_{9}	—	May 1, 2000	Socorro	LINEAR	ERI	2.5 km	MPC · JPL
150464	2000 JH_{11}	—	May 3, 2000	Socorro	LINEAR	NYS	1.9 km	MPC · JPL
150465	2000 JD_{12}	—	May 5, 2000	Socorro	LINEAR	V	1.2 km	MPC · JPL
150466	2000 JP_{34}	—	May 7, 2000	Socorro	LINEAR	MAS	1.2 km	MPC · JPL
150467	2000 JC_{64}	—	May 10, 2000	Socorro	LINEAR	·	1.5 km	MPC · JPL
150468	2000 JY_{83}	—	May 5, 2000	Socorro	LINEAR	·	1.9 km	MPC · JPL
150469	2000 KV_{4}	—	May 27, 2000	Socorro	LINEAR	PHO	2.5 km	MPC · JPL
150470	2000 KT_{28}	—	May 28, 2000	Socorro	LINEAR	·	2.7 km	MPC · JPL
150471	2000 KH_{55}	—	May 27, 2000	Socorro	LINEAR	·	2.5 km	MPC · JPL
150472	2000 KM_{73}	—	May 28, 2000	Anderson Mesa	LONEOS	·	2.9 km	MPC · JPL
150473	2000 KE_{83}	—	May 24, 2000	Anderson Mesa	LONEOS	·	2.3 km	MPC · JPL
150474	2000 LV_{32}	—	June 4, 2000	Socorro	LINEAR	·	2.1 km	MPC · JPL
150475	2000 NJ_{15}	—	July 5, 2000	Anderson Mesa	LONEOS	·	4.0 km	MPC · JPL
150476	2000 NT_{22}	—	July 7, 2000	Socorro	LINEAR	(5)	2.6 km	MPC · JPL
150477	2000 OQ_{21}	—	July 30, 2000	Socorro	LINEAR	·	3.6 km	MPC · JPL
150478	2000 OS_{26}	—	July 23, 2000	Socorro	LINEAR	·	2.2 km	MPC · JPL
150479	2000 OS_{40}	—	July 30, 2000	Socorro	LINEAR	DOR	7.6 km	MPC · JPL
150480	2000 OM_{46}	—	July 31, 2000	Socorro	LINEAR	·	2.6 km	MPC · JPL
150481	2000 OR_{60}	—	July 29, 2000	Anderson Mesa	LONEOS	·	3.0 km	MPC · JPL
150482	2000 PR_{3}	—	August 3, 2000	Socorro	LINEAR	PHO	2.1 km	MPC · JPL
150483	2000 PQ_{4}	—	August 3, 2000	Bisei SG Center	BATTeRS	H	1.1 km	MPC · JPL
150484	2000 PM_{29}	—	August 1, 2000	Socorro	LINEAR	GEF	2.5 km	MPC · JPL
150485	2000 QF_{2}	—	August 24, 2000	Socorro	LINEAR	H	870 m	MPC · JPL
150486	2000 QT_{11}	—	August 24, 2000	Socorro	LINEAR	·	4.6 km	MPC · JPL
150487	2000 QY_{11}	—	August 24, 2000	Socorro	LINEAR	·	3.0 km	MPC · JPL
150488	2000 QJ_{14}	—	August 24, 2000	Socorro	LINEAR	·	3.2 km	MPC · JPL
150489	2000 QS_{43}	—	August 24, 2000	Socorro	LINEAR	·	2.6 km	MPC · JPL
150490	2000 QD_{44}	—	August 24, 2000	Socorro	LINEAR	·	2.6 km	MPC · JPL
150491	2000 QN_{45}	—	August 24, 2000	Socorro	LINEAR	·	3.3 km	MPC · JPL
150492	2000 QZ_{70}	—	August 26, 2000	Prescott	P. G. Comba	·	2.3 km	MPC · JPL
150493	2000 QV_{77}	—	August 24, 2000	Socorro	LINEAR	·	3.8 km	MPC · JPL
150494	2000 QL_{80}	—	August 24, 2000	Socorro	LINEAR	·	1.5 km	MPC · JPL
150495	2000 QO_{88}	—	August 25, 2000	Socorro	LINEAR	·	3.2 km	MPC · JPL
150496	2000 QD_{94}	—	August 26, 2000	Socorro	LINEAR	GEF	2.3 km	MPC · JPL
150497	2000 QM_{96}	—	August 28, 2000	Socorro	LINEAR	·	3.9 km	MPC · JPL
150498	2000 QV_{111}	—	August 24, 2000	Socorro	LINEAR	·	3.2 km	MPC · JPL
150499	2000 QV_{117}	—	August 29, 2000	Črni Vrh	H. Mikuž, S. Matičič	·	3.3 km	MPC · JPL
150500	2000 QD_{125}	—	August 31, 2000	Socorro	LINEAR	·	3.4 km	MPC · JPL

== 150501–150600 ==
back to top

Designation			Discovery			Properties		Ref
Permanent	Provisional	Named after	Date	Site	Discoverer(s)	Category	Diam.	Ref
150501	2000 QU_{125}	—	August 31, 2000	Socorro	LINEAR	·	4.1 km	MPC · JPL
150502	2000 QZ_{169}	—	August 31, 2000	Socorro	LINEAR	·	4.9 km	MPC · JPL
150503	2000 QR_{171}	—	August 31, 2000	Socorro	LINEAR	·	3.8 km	MPC · JPL
150504	2000 QT_{190}	—	August 26, 2000	Socorro	LINEAR	EUN	2.3 km	MPC · JPL
150505	2000 QR_{196}	—	August 29, 2000	Socorro	LINEAR	GEF	2.1 km	MPC · JPL
150506	2000 QZ_{201}	—	August 29, 2000	Socorro	LINEAR	HOF	5.1 km	MPC · JPL
150507	2000 QY_{209}	—	August 31, 2000	Socorro	LINEAR	·	4.4 km	MPC · JPL
150508	2000 QT_{220}	—	August 21, 2000	Anderson Mesa	LONEOS	·	3.5 km	MPC · JPL
150509	2000 QK_{237}	—	August 27, 2000	Cerro Tololo	M. W. Buie	·	2.1 km	MPC · JPL
150510	2000 QQ_{247}	—	August 28, 2000	Cerro Tololo	M. W. Buie	KOR	2.2 km	MPC · JPL
150511	2000 QU_{252}	—	August 29, 2000	La Silla	Barbieri, C.	·	3.0 km	MPC · JPL
150512	2000 QQ_{254}	—	August 21, 2000	Anderson Mesa	LONEOS	·	3.1 km	MPC · JPL
150513	2000 RL_{17}	—	September 1, 2000	Socorro	LINEAR	EUN	2.3 km	MPC · JPL
150514	2000 RQ_{25}	—	September 1, 2000	Socorro	LINEAR	·	4.1 km	MPC · JPL
150515	2000 RA_{30}	—	September 1, 2000	Socorro	LINEAR	·	3.9 km	MPC · JPL
150516	2000 RD_{32}	—	September 1, 2000	Socorro	LINEAR	·	4.2 km	MPC · JPL
150517	2000 RF_{54}	—	September 1, 2000	Socorro	LINEAR	·	3.5 km	MPC · JPL
150518	2000 RK_{85}	—	September 2, 2000	Anderson Mesa	LONEOS	·	4.4 km	MPC · JPL
150519	2000 RR_{89}	—	September 3, 2000	Socorro	LINEAR	RAF	1.5 km	MPC · JPL
150520 Dong	2000 RF_{107}	Dong	September 3, 2000	Apache Point	SDSS	·	3.0 km	MPC · JPL
150521	2000 SK_{1}	—	September 18, 2000	Socorro	LINEAR	H	1.6 km	MPC · JPL
150522	2000 SU_{14}	—	September 23, 2000	Socorro	LINEAR	·	3.5 km	MPC · JPL
150523	2000 SH_{15}	—	September 23, 2000	Socorro	LINEAR	GEF	1.7 km	MPC · JPL
150524	2000 SY_{21}	—	September 24, 2000	Socorro	LINEAR	H	930 m	MPC · JPL
150525	2000 SQ_{32}	—	September 24, 2000	Socorro	LINEAR	·	4.6 km	MPC · JPL
150526	2000 SW_{43}	—	September 22, 2000	Socorro	LINEAR	H	950 m	MPC · JPL
150527	2000 SY_{45}	—	September 22, 2000	Socorro	LINEAR	·	4.2 km	MPC · JPL
150528	2000 SF_{47}	—	September 23, 2000	Socorro	LINEAR	·	4.0 km	MPC · JPL
150529	2000 SK_{49}	—	September 23, 2000	Socorro	LINEAR	·	3.4 km	MPC · JPL
150530	2000 SN_{50}	—	September 23, 2000	Socorro	LINEAR	·	2.8 km	MPC · JPL
150531	2000 SR_{50}	—	September 23, 2000	Socorro	LINEAR	·	3.4 km	MPC · JPL
150532	2000 SQ_{53}	—	September 24, 2000	Socorro	LINEAR	·	2.9 km	MPC · JPL
150533	2000 SE_{57}	—	September 24, 2000	Socorro	LINEAR	KOR	2.0 km	MPC · JPL
150534	2000 SK_{57}	—	September 24, 2000	Socorro	LINEAR	HOF	4.3 km	MPC · JPL
150535	2000 SH_{62}	—	September 24, 2000	Socorro	LINEAR	·	3.2 km	MPC · JPL
150536	2000 SG_{77}	—	September 24, 2000	Socorro	LINEAR	·	4.8 km	MPC · JPL
150537	2000 SV_{77}	—	September 24, 2000	Socorro	LINEAR	·	3.2 km	MPC · JPL
150538	2000 SZ_{102}	—	September 24, 2000	Socorro	LINEAR	·	3.3 km	MPC · JPL
150539	2000 SS_{128}	—	September 24, 2000	Socorro	LINEAR	·	3.2 km	MPC · JPL
150540	2000 SR_{133}	—	September 23, 2000	Socorro	LINEAR	GEF	2.1 km	MPC · JPL
150541	2000 ST_{142}	—	September 23, 2000	Socorro	LINEAR	·	4.3 km	MPC · JPL
150542	2000 SW_{157}	—	September 27, 2000	Socorro	LINEAR	HYG	3.2 km	MPC · JPL
150543	2000 ST_{161}	—	September 20, 2000	Haleakala	NEAT	·	3.0 km	MPC · JPL
150544	2000 SG_{164}	—	September 25, 2000	Socorro	LINEAR	H	1.1 km	MPC · JPL
150545	2000 SR_{166}	—	September 23, 2000	Socorro	LINEAR	ADE	5.2 km	MPC · JPL
150546	2000 SD_{168}	—	September 23, 2000	Socorro	LINEAR	·	2.8 km	MPC · JPL
150547	2000 ST_{174}	—	September 28, 2000	Socorro	LINEAR	·	3.4 km	MPC · JPL
150548	2000 SE_{176}	—	September 28, 2000	Socorro	LINEAR	·	2.9 km	MPC · JPL
150549	2000 SQ_{181}	—	September 19, 2000	Haleakala	NEAT	·	2.2 km	MPC · JPL
150550	2000 SV_{182}	—	September 20, 2000	Kitt Peak	Spacewatch	·	3.4 km	MPC · JPL
150551	2000 SY_{193}	—	September 24, 2000	Socorro	LINEAR	(5)	1.9 km	MPC · JPL
150552	2000 SC_{194}	—	September 24, 2000	Socorro	LINEAR	·	3.0 km	MPC · JPL
150553	2000 SM_{196}	—	September 24, 2000	Socorro	LINEAR	·	2.2 km	MPC · JPL
150554	2000 SS_{204}	—	September 24, 2000	Socorro	LINEAR	·	6.3 km	MPC · JPL
150555	2000 SK_{206}	—	September 24, 2000	Socorro	LINEAR	·	3.3 km	MPC · JPL
150556	2000 ST_{206}	—	September 24, 2000	Socorro	LINEAR	·	2.8 km	MPC · JPL
150557	2000 SQ_{215}	—	September 26, 2000	Socorro	LINEAR	AGN	2.0 km	MPC · JPL
150558	2000 SY_{235}	—	September 24, 2000	Socorro	LINEAR	·	2.1 km	MPC · JPL
150559	2000 SA_{236}	—	September 24, 2000	Socorro	LINEAR	·	3.8 km	MPC · JPL
150560	2000 SF_{246}	—	September 24, 2000	Socorro	LINEAR	NEM	4.3 km	MPC · JPL
150561	2000 SL_{246}	—	September 24, 2000	Socorro	LINEAR	615	2.3 km	MPC · JPL
150562	2000 SR_{249}	—	September 24, 2000	Socorro	LINEAR	RAF	1.5 km	MPC · JPL
150563	2000 ST_{276}	—	September 30, 2000	Socorro	LINEAR	·	5.7 km	MPC · JPL
150564	2000 SV_{284}	—	September 23, 2000	Socorro	LINEAR	·	4.3 km	MPC · JPL
150565	2000 SY_{305}	—	September 30, 2000	Socorro	LINEAR	·	4.2 km	MPC · JPL
150566	2000 SG_{313}	—	September 27, 2000	Socorro	LINEAR	·	2.9 km	MPC · JPL
150567	2000 SO_{336}	—	September 26, 2000	Haleakala	NEAT	·	3.4 km	MPC · JPL
150568	2000 SC_{341}	—	September 24, 2000	Socorro	LINEAR	PAD	2.6 km	MPC · JPL
150569	2000 ST_{348}	—	September 30, 2000	Anderson Mesa	LONEOS	GEF	2.2 km	MPC · JPL
150570	2000 SE_{352}	—	September 30, 2000	Anderson Mesa	LONEOS	·	3.1 km	MPC · JPL
150571	2000 SE_{368}	—	September 21, 2000	Anderson Mesa	LONEOS	WIT	1.6 km	MPC · JPL
150572	2000 TQ_{10}	—	October 1, 2000	Socorro	LINEAR	·	5.4 km	MPC · JPL
150573	2000 TK_{34}	—	October 6, 2000	Anderson Mesa	LONEOS	·	3.6 km	MPC · JPL
150574	2000 TR_{36}	—	October 6, 2000	Anderson Mesa	LONEOS	KOR	2.1 km	MPC · JPL
150575	2000 TM_{41}	—	October 1, 2000	Anderson Mesa	LONEOS	GEF	1.9 km	MPC · JPL
150576	2000 TP_{49}	—	October 1, 2000	Socorro	LINEAR	·	5.6 km	MPC · JPL
150577	2000 UQ_{19}	—	October 26, 2000	Socorro	LINEAR	·	6.8 km	MPC · JPL
150578	2000 UU_{20}	—	October 24, 2000	Socorro	LINEAR	KOR	2.4 km	MPC · JPL
150579	2000 UJ_{21}	—	October 24, 2000	Socorro	LINEAR	THM	3.8 km	MPC · JPL
150580	2000 UY_{39}	—	October 24, 2000	Socorro	LINEAR	·	3.7 km	MPC · JPL
150581	2000 UE_{68}	—	October 25, 2000	Socorro	LINEAR	EOS	4.1 km	MPC · JPL
150582	2000 UP_{69}	—	October 25, 2000	Socorro	LINEAR	·	3.8 km	MPC · JPL
150583	2000 UH_{75}	—	October 31, 2000	Socorro	LINEAR	NAE	5.3 km	MPC · JPL
150584	2000 VC_{45}	—	November 1, 2000	Socorro	LINEAR	·	3.5 km	MPC · JPL
150585	2000 WN_{9}	—	November 22, 2000	Bisei SG Center	BATTeRS	·	5.4 km	MPC · JPL
150586	2000 WQ_{16}	—	November 21, 2000	Socorro	LINEAR	·	4.8 km	MPC · JPL
150587	2000 WF_{26}	—	November 21, 2000	Socorro	LINEAR	·	4.5 km	MPC · JPL
150588	2000 WS_{26}	—	November 25, 2000	Socorro	LINEAR	·	5.4 km	MPC · JPL
150589	2000 WV_{41}	—	November 20, 2000	Socorro	LINEAR	·	5.0 km	MPC · JPL
150590	2000 WQ_{75}	—	November 20, 2000	Socorro	LINEAR	TIR	4.8 km	MPC · JPL
150591	2000 WF_{94}	—	November 21, 2000	Socorro	LINEAR	·	7.3 km	MPC · JPL
150592	2000 WG_{99}	—	November 21, 2000	Socorro	LINEAR	EOS	5.8 km	MPC · JPL
150593	2000 WM_{129}	—	November 19, 2000	Kitt Peak	Spacewatch	EOS	3.4 km	MPC · JPL
150594	2000 WY_{129}	—	November 19, 2000	Socorro	LINEAR	·	6.0 km	MPC · JPL
150595	2000 WK_{132}	—	November 19, 2000	Socorro	LINEAR	·	3.9 km	MPC · JPL
150596	2000 WE_{136}	—	November 20, 2000	Socorro	LINEAR	EOS	3.2 km	MPC · JPL
150597	2000 WA_{140}	—	November 21, 2000	Socorro	LINEAR	KOR	2.2 km	MPC · JPL
150598	2000 WS_{145}	—	November 22, 2000	Haleakala	NEAT	·	4.5 km	MPC · JPL
150599	2000 WK_{161}	—	November 20, 2000	Anderson Mesa	LONEOS	EOS	3.3 km	MPC · JPL
150600	2000 WB_{175}	—	November 26, 2000	Socorro	LINEAR	·	5.2 km	MPC · JPL

== 150601–150700 ==
back to top

Designation			Discovery			Properties		Ref
Permanent	Provisional	Named after	Date	Site	Discoverer(s)	Category	Diam.	Ref
150601	2000 WR_{181}	—	November 23, 2000	Haleakala	NEAT	·	4.1 km	MPC · JPL
150602	2000 WV_{183}	—	November 30, 2000	Anderson Mesa	LONEOS	·	5.8 km	MPC · JPL
150603	2000 XV_{3}	—	December 1, 2000	Socorro	LINEAR	·	4.8 km	MPC · JPL
150604	2000 XY_{8}	—	December 1, 2000	Socorro	LINEAR	·	6.5 km	MPC · JPL
150605	2000 XV_{11}	—	December 4, 2000	Socorro	LINEAR	·	3.7 km	MPC · JPL
150606	2000 XN_{30}	—	December 4, 2000	Socorro	LINEAR	·	5.1 km	MPC · JPL
150607	2000 XT_{32}	—	December 4, 2000	Socorro	LINEAR	EOS	3.9 km	MPC · JPL
150608	2000 XG_{40}	—	December 5, 2000	Socorro	LINEAR	·	6.9 km	MPC · JPL
150609	2000 XY_{44}	—	December 8, 2000	Socorro	LINEAR	H	1.7 km	MPC · JPL
150610	2000 YY_{10}	—	December 22, 2000	Socorro	LINEAR	·	5.2 km	MPC · JPL
150611	2000 YR_{12}	—	December 23, 2000	Desert Beaver	W. K. Y. Yeung	·	7.3 km	MPC · JPL
150612	2000 YJ_{36}	—	December 30, 2000	Socorro	LINEAR	·	3.7 km	MPC · JPL
150613	2000 YF_{39}	—	December 30, 2000	Socorro	LINEAR	·	4.3 km	MPC · JPL
150614	2000 YA_{42}	—	December 30, 2000	Socorro	LINEAR	·	5.6 km	MPC · JPL
150615	2000 YS_{42}	—	December 30, 2000	Socorro	LINEAR	·	5.3 km	MPC · JPL
150616	2000 YV_{43}	—	December 30, 2000	Socorro	LINEAR	·	5.7 km	MPC · JPL
150617	2000 YM_{53}	—	December 30, 2000	Socorro	LINEAR	THM	4.2 km	MPC · JPL
150618	2000 YO_{64}	—	December 30, 2000	Socorro	LINEAR	·	7.6 km	MPC · JPL
150619	2000 YM_{69}	—	December 30, 2000	Socorro	LINEAR	·	5.8 km	MPC · JPL
150620	2000 YM_{71}	—	December 30, 2000	Socorro	LINEAR	·	5.1 km	MPC · JPL
150621	2000 YA_{79}	—	December 30, 2000	Socorro	LINEAR	·	4.0 km	MPC · JPL
150622	2000 YD_{81}	—	December 30, 2000	Socorro	LINEAR	·	5.6 km	MPC · JPL
150623	2000 YF_{110}	—	December 30, 2000	Socorro	LINEAR	·	5.2 km	MPC · JPL
150624	2000 YF_{125}	—	December 29, 2000	Anderson Mesa	LONEOS	TIR	5.0 km	MPC · JPL
150625	2000 YN_{130}	—	December 30, 2000	Socorro	LINEAR	THM	3.1 km	MPC · JPL
150626	2001 AG_{7}	—	January 2, 2001	Socorro	LINEAR	·	6.1 km	MPC · JPL
150627	2001 AU_{26}	—	January 5, 2001	Socorro	LINEAR	·	4.6 km	MPC · JPL
150628	2001 AX_{32}	—	January 4, 2001	Socorro	LINEAR	·	4.7 km	MPC · JPL
150629	2001 AU_{40}	—	January 3, 2001	Anderson Mesa	LONEOS	EOS	4.1 km	MPC · JPL
150630	2001 AQ_{45}	—	January 15, 2001	Socorro	LINEAR	·	5.4 km	MPC · JPL
150631	2001 AK_{48}	—	January 15, 2001	Bergisch Gladbach	W. Bickel	·	4.3 km	MPC · JPL
150632	2001 BY_{6}	—	January 19, 2001	Socorro	LINEAR	·	4.7 km	MPC · JPL
150633	2001 BE_{8}	—	January 19, 2001	Socorro	LINEAR	TIR	5.5 km	MPC · JPL
150634	2001 BY_{25}	—	January 20, 2001	Socorro	LINEAR	·	7.0 km	MPC · JPL
150635	2001 BM_{40}	—	January 21, 2001	Socorro	LINEAR	·	3.8 km	MPC · JPL
150636	2001 BR_{50}	—	January 27, 2001	Ondřejov	P. Kušnirák, P. Pravec	·	7.6 km	MPC · JPL
150637	2001 BL_{55}	—	January 19, 2001	Socorro	LINEAR	·	4.9 km	MPC · JPL
150638	2001 BO_{80}	—	January 20, 2001	Haleakala	NEAT	·	5.0 km	MPC · JPL
150639	2001 CX_{8}	—	February 1, 2001	Socorro	LINEAR	·	5.8 km	MPC · JPL
150640	2001 CQ_{20}	—	February 3, 2001	Socorro	LINEAR	T_{j} (2.99)	11 km	MPC · JPL
150641	2001 CU_{25}	—	February 1, 2001	Socorro	LINEAR	·	5.8 km	MPC · JPL
150642	2001 CZ_{31}	—	February 3, 2001	Mauna Kea	Veillet, C.	cubewano (hot)	302 km	MPC · JPL
150643	2001 CB_{39}	—	February 13, 2001	Socorro	LINEAR	·	4.8 km	MPC · JPL
150644	2001 DR_{27}	—	February 17, 2001	Socorro	LINEAR	·	1.6 km	MPC · JPL
150645	2001 DF_{35}	—	February 19, 2001	Socorro	LINEAR	·	6.6 km	MPC · JPL
150646	2001 DX_{36}	—	February 19, 2001	Socorro	LINEAR	·	1.3 km	MPC · JPL
150647	2001 DU_{71}	—	February 19, 2001	Socorro	LINEAR	CYB	6.6 km	MPC · JPL
150648	2001 DA_{74}	—	February 19, 2001	Socorro	LINEAR	THB	6.1 km	MPC · JPL
150649	2001 DK_{88}	—	February 25, 2001	Haleakala	NEAT	THB	6.3 km	MPC · JPL
150650	2001 DN_{91}	—	February 20, 2001	Socorro	LINEAR	THM	3.6 km	MPC · JPL
150651	2001 DR_{94}	—	February 19, 2001	Kitt Peak	Spacewatch	THM	5.4 km	MPC · JPL
150652	2001 DG_{98}	—	February 17, 2001	Socorro	LINEAR	·	8.4 km	MPC · JPL
150653	2001 DT_{100}	—	February 16, 2001	Socorro	LINEAR	·	9.6 km	MPC · JPL
150654	2001 DR_{105}	—	February 16, 2001	Anderson Mesa	LONEOS	·	6.0 km	MPC · JPL
150655	2001 EO_{2}	—	March 1, 2001	Socorro	LINEAR	·	8.8 km	MPC · JPL
150656	2001 EE_{6}	—	March 2, 2001	Anderson Mesa	LONEOS	·	4.7 km	MPC · JPL
150657	2001 EJ_{21}	—	March 15, 2001	Anderson Mesa	LONEOS	·	1.3 km	MPC · JPL
150658	2001 FN_{39}	—	March 18, 2001	Socorro	LINEAR	·	7.3 km	MPC · JPL
150659	2001 FY_{74}	—	March 19, 2001	Socorro	LINEAR	·	1.7 km	MPC · JPL
150660	2001 FG_{106}	—	March 18, 2001	Socorro	LINEAR	·	1.1 km	MPC · JPL
150661	2001 FU_{188}	—	March 16, 2001	Socorro	LINEAR	URS	6.0 km	MPC · JPL
150662	2001 HG_{37}	—	April 29, 2001	Socorro	LINEAR	·	2.9 km	MPC · JPL
150663	2001 JN_{6}	—	May 14, 2001	Kitt Peak	Spacewatch	·	2.1 km	MPC · JPL
150664	2001 KQ_{18}	—	May 21, 2001	Kitt Peak	Spacewatch	·	1.1 km	MPC · JPL
150665	2001 KE_{22}	—	May 17, 2001	Socorro	LINEAR	·	890 m	MPC · JPL
150666	2001 KH_{41}	—	May 23, 2001	Socorro	LINEAR	·	1.2 km	MPC · JPL
150667	2001 KV_{66}	—	May 30, 2001	Socorro	LINEAR	PHO	2.2 km	MPC · JPL
150668	2001 MP_{4}	—	June 17, 2001	Palomar	NEAT	·	2.4 km	MPC · JPL
150669	2001 MZ_{9}	—	June 23, 2001	Palomar	NEAT	·	1.4 km	MPC · JPL
150670	2001 MX_{17}	—	June 28, 2001	Anderson Mesa	LONEOS	·	2.9 km	MPC · JPL
150671	2001 MZ_{20}	—	June 26, 2001	Palomar	NEAT	·	2.0 km	MPC · JPL
150672	2001 MJ_{28}	—	June 24, 2001	Socorro	LINEAR	·	2.6 km	MPC · JPL
150673	2001 NW_{4}	—	July 13, 2001	Palomar	NEAT	CLA	2.5 km	MPC · JPL
150674	2001 NK_{12}	—	July 13, 2001	Haleakala	NEAT	·	1.1 km	MPC · JPL
150675	2001 NF_{16}	—	July 14, 2001	Palomar	NEAT	·	1.1 km	MPC · JPL
150676	2001 OY_{1}	—	July 18, 2001	Palomar	NEAT	·	1.7 km	MPC · JPL
150677	2001 OP_{8}	—	July 17, 2001	Anderson Mesa	LONEOS	·	1.4 km	MPC · JPL
150678	2001 OY_{8}	—	July 20, 2001	Anderson Mesa	LONEOS	EUN	2.8 km	MPC · JPL
150679	2001 OB_{10}	—	July 19, 2001	Palomar	NEAT	MAS	1.0 km	MPC · JPL
150680	2001 OZ_{42}	—	July 22, 2001	Palomar	NEAT	·	2.3 km	MPC · JPL
150681	2001 OX_{47}	—	July 16, 2001	Haleakala	NEAT	(2076)	1.5 km	MPC · JPL
150682	2001 OS_{49}	—	July 17, 2001	Palomar	NEAT	(5)	2.0 km	MPC · JPL
150683	2001 OE_{51}	—	July 21, 2001	Palomar	NEAT	V	1.3 km	MPC · JPL
150684	2001 OB_{60}	—	July 21, 2001	Haleakala	NEAT	·	1.9 km	MPC · JPL
150685	2001 OP_{62}	—	July 20, 2001	Anderson Mesa	LONEOS	·	1.3 km	MPC · JPL
150686	2001 OR_{62}	—	July 20, 2001	Anderson Mesa	LONEOS	V	1 km	MPC · JPL
150687	2001 OR_{65}	—	July 28, 2001	Reedy Creek	J. Broughton	·	1.5 km	MPC · JPL
150688	2001 OJ_{67}	—	July 26, 2001	Haleakala	NEAT	·	1.8 km	MPC · JPL
150689	2001 OP_{69}	—	July 19, 2001	Anderson Mesa	LONEOS	·	2.1 km	MPC · JPL
150690	2001 OO_{74}	—	July 29, 2001	Reedy Creek	J. Broughton	·	1.6 km	MPC · JPL
150691	2001 OW_{86}	—	July 29, 2001	Palomar	NEAT	(5)	2.5 km	MPC · JPL
150692	2001 OL_{89}	—	July 22, 2001	Socorro	LINEAR	·	2.1 km	MPC · JPL
150693	2001 OH_{95}	—	July 30, 2001	Palomar	NEAT	·	2.7 km	MPC · JPL
150694	2001 OM_{96}	—	July 24, 2001	Palomar	NEAT	·	2.6 km	MPC · JPL
150695	2001 OJ_{98}	—	July 25, 2001	Haleakala	NEAT	·	1.9 km	MPC · JPL
150696	2001 OE_{102}	—	July 28, 2001	Haleakala	NEAT	·	2.3 km	MPC · JPL
150697	2001 PS_{2}	—	August 3, 2001	Haleakala	NEAT	·	1.0 km	MPC · JPL
150698	2001 PG_{7}	—	August 11, 2001	Ondřejov	P. Kušnirák	·	1.4 km	MPC · JPL
150699	2001 PU_{8}	—	August 11, 2001	Haleakala	NEAT	·	1.5 km	MPC · JPL
150700	2001 PB_{20}	—	August 10, 2001	Palomar	NEAT	·	1.3 km	MPC · JPL

== 150701–150800 ==
back to top

Designation			Discovery			Properties		Ref
Permanent	Provisional	Named after	Date	Site	Discoverer(s)	Category	Diam.	Ref
150701	2001 PT_{21}	—	August 10, 2001	Haleakala	NEAT	·	1.5 km	MPC · JPL
150702	2001 PT_{22}	—	August 10, 2001	Haleakala	NEAT	(2076)	1.3 km	MPC · JPL
150703	2001 PK_{32}	—	August 10, 2001	Palomar	NEAT	(5)	2.7 km	MPC · JPL
150704	2001 PE_{37}	—	August 11, 2001	Palomar	NEAT	·	2.8 km	MPC · JPL
150705	2001 PC_{38}	—	August 11, 2001	Palomar	NEAT	·	5.1 km	MPC · JPL
150706	2001 PZ_{43}	—	August 14, 2001	Haleakala	NEAT	·	2.5 km	MPC · JPL
150707	2001 PG_{45}	—	August 11, 2001	Haleakala	NEAT	V	1.2 km	MPC · JPL
150708	2001 PK_{58}	—	August 14, 2001	Haleakala	NEAT	V	1.2 km	MPC · JPL
150709	2001 PF_{61}	—	August 13, 2001	Haleakala	NEAT	·	1.6 km	MPC · JPL
150710	2001 PX_{61}	—	August 13, 2001	Haleakala	NEAT	NYS	1.6 km	MPC · JPL
150711	2001 PE_{62}	—	August 13, 2001	Haleakala	NEAT	·	1.5 km	MPC · JPL
150712	2001 QD	—	August 16, 2001	San Marcello	A. Boattini, L. Tesi	·	1.1 km	MPC · JPL
150713	2001 QF	—	August 16, 2001	San Marcello	L. Tesi, M. Tombelli	NYS	1.4 km	MPC · JPL
150714	2001 QL_{4}	—	August 16, 2001	Socorro	LINEAR	·	2.4 km	MPC · JPL
150715	2001 QJ_{5}	—	August 16, 2001	Socorro	LINEAR	·	2.4 km	MPC · JPL
150716	2001 QN_{5}	—	August 16, 2001	Socorro	LINEAR	·	1.5 km	MPC · JPL
150717	2001 QT_{7}	—	August 16, 2001	Socorro	LINEAR	·	1.9 km	MPC · JPL
150718	2001 QT_{13}	—	August 16, 2001	Socorro	LINEAR	·	3.2 km	MPC · JPL
150719	2001 QQ_{17}	—	August 16, 2001	Socorro	LINEAR	·	1.5 km	MPC · JPL
150720	2001 QB_{19}	—	August 16, 2001	Socorro	LINEAR	·	2.1 km	MPC · JPL
150721	2001 QN_{21}	—	August 16, 2001	Socorro	LINEAR	·	2.4 km	MPC · JPL
150722	2001 QJ_{22}	—	August 16, 2001	Socorro	LINEAR	·	2.9 km	MPC · JPL
150723	2001 QF_{24}	—	August 16, 2001	Socorro	LINEAR	NYS	2.1 km	MPC · JPL
150724	2001 QB_{32}	—	August 17, 2001	Socorro	LINEAR	·	3.7 km	MPC · JPL
150725	2001 QD_{32}	—	August 17, 2001	Socorro	LINEAR	V	1.2 km	MPC · JPL
150726	2001 QL_{36}	—	August 16, 2001	Socorro	LINEAR	·	1.5 km	MPC · JPL
150727	2001 QP_{38}	—	August 16, 2001	Socorro	LINEAR	MAS	1.3 km	MPC · JPL
150728	2001 QK_{39}	—	August 16, 2001	Socorro	LINEAR	MAS	1.1 km	MPC · JPL
150729	2001 QG_{40}	—	August 16, 2001	Socorro	LINEAR	·	1.6 km	MPC · JPL
150730	2001 QN_{44}	—	August 16, 2001	Socorro	LINEAR	MAS	1.2 km	MPC · JPL
150731	2001 QW_{45}	—	August 16, 2001	Socorro	LINEAR	·	1.6 km	MPC · JPL
150732	2001 QG_{46}	—	August 16, 2001	Socorro	LINEAR	NYS	1.7 km	MPC · JPL
150733	2001 QR_{49}	—	August 16, 2001	Socorro	LINEAR	·	1.0 km	MPC · JPL
150734	2001 QG_{50}	—	August 16, 2001	Socorro	LINEAR	·	1.7 km	MPC · JPL
150735	2001 QX_{50}	—	August 16, 2001	Socorro	LINEAR	(5)	1.5 km	MPC · JPL
150736	2001 QW_{51}	—	August 16, 2001	Socorro	LINEAR	·	2.1 km	MPC · JPL
150737	2001 QA_{55}	—	August 16, 2001	Socorro	LINEAR	NYS	1.8 km	MPC · JPL
150738	2001 QP_{62}	—	August 16, 2001	Socorro	LINEAR	(5)	2.4 km	MPC · JPL
150739	2001 QA_{67}	—	August 18, 2001	Socorro	LINEAR	·	5.5 km	MPC · JPL
150740	2001 QF_{69}	—	August 17, 2001	Socorro	LINEAR	·	2.3 km	MPC · JPL
150741	2001 QE_{85}	—	August 19, 2001	Socorro	LINEAR	·	2.4 km	MPC · JPL
150742	2001 QY_{85}	—	August 22, 2001	Desert Eagle	W. K. Y. Yeung	·	1.7 km	MPC · JPL
150743	2001 QS_{87}	—	August 21, 2001	Haleakala	NEAT	V	1.5 km	MPC · JPL
150744	2001 QE_{94}	—	August 20, 2001	Ondřejov	P. Pravec, P. Kušnirák	MAS	1.0 km	MPC · JPL
150745	2001 QU_{113}	—	August 26, 2001	Ondřejov	P. Pravec, P. Kušnirák	·	2.0 km	MPC · JPL
150746	2001 QH_{118}	—	August 17, 2001	Socorro	LINEAR	V	1.2 km	MPC · JPL
150747	2001 QL_{118}	—	August 17, 2001	Socorro	LINEAR	PHO	4.9 km	MPC · JPL
150748	2001 QT_{119}	—	August 18, 2001	Socorro	LINEAR	·	1.8 km	MPC · JPL
150749	2001 QJ_{120}	—	August 18, 2001	Socorro	LINEAR	·	2.2 km	MPC · JPL
150750	2001 QS_{123}	—	August 19, 2001	Socorro	LINEAR	·	1.8 km	MPC · JPL
150751	2001 QK_{125}	—	August 19, 2001	Socorro	LINEAR	·	2.0 km	MPC · JPL
150752	2001 QE_{131}	—	August 20, 2001	Socorro	LINEAR	EUN	1.8 km	MPC · JPL
150753	2001 QS_{134}	—	August 22, 2001	Socorro	LINEAR	·	1.5 km	MPC · JPL
150754	2001 QJ_{139}	—	August 22, 2001	Socorro	LINEAR	·	2.1 km	MPC · JPL
150755	2001 QP_{140}	—	August 22, 2001	Socorro	LINEAR	·	2.2 km	MPC · JPL
150756	2001 QB_{148}	—	August 20, 2001	Palomar	NEAT	·	3.2 km	MPC · JPL
150757	2001 QX_{154}	—	August 23, 2001	Anderson Mesa	LONEOS	·	3.0 km	MPC · JPL
150758	2001 QV_{155}	—	August 23, 2001	Anderson Mesa	LONEOS	(5)	1.7 km	MPC · JPL
150759	2001 QE_{157}	—	August 23, 2001	Anderson Mesa	LONEOS	·	1.3 km	MPC · JPL
150760	2001 QO_{161}	—	August 23, 2001	Anderson Mesa	LONEOS	·	1.9 km	MPC · JPL
150761	2001 QA_{180}	—	August 25, 2001	Palomar	NEAT	·	3.2 km	MPC · JPL
150762	2001 QD_{197}	—	August 22, 2001	Goodricke-Pigott	R. A. Tucker	·	1.6 km	MPC · JPL
150763	2001 QM_{201}	—	August 22, 2001	Kitt Peak	Spacewatch	(5)	1.9 km	MPC · JPL
150764	2001 QY_{204}	—	August 23, 2001	Anderson Mesa	LONEOS	·	2.1 km	MPC · JPL
150765	2001 QE_{210}	—	August 23, 2001	Desert Eagle	W. K. Y. Yeung	MAS	940 m	MPC · JPL
150766	2001 QB_{212}	—	August 23, 2001	Anderson Mesa	LONEOS	·	1.9 km	MPC · JPL
150767	2001 QQ_{216}	—	August 23, 2001	Anderson Mesa	LONEOS	PHO	4.2 km	MPC · JPL
150768	2001 QE_{218}	—	August 23, 2001	Anderson Mesa	LONEOS	NYS	1.4 km	MPC · JPL
150769	2001 QX_{227}	—	August 24, 2001	Desert Eagle	W. K. Y. Yeung	MAS	1.3 km	MPC · JPL
150770	2001 QX_{234}	—	August 24, 2001	Socorro	LINEAR	·	2.0 km	MPC · JPL
150771	2001 QX_{236}	—	August 24, 2001	Socorro	LINEAR	·	2.2 km	MPC · JPL
150772	2001 QV_{237}	—	August 24, 2001	Socorro	LINEAR	NYS	1.9 km	MPC · JPL
150773	2001 QJ_{240}	—	August 24, 2001	Socorro	LINEAR	·	1.1 km	MPC · JPL
150774	2001 QD_{245}	—	August 24, 2001	Socorro	LINEAR	V	1.3 km	MPC · JPL
150775	2001 QY_{248}	—	August 24, 2001	Socorro	LINEAR	(5)	2.5 km	MPC · JPL
150776	2001 QG_{256}	—	August 25, 2001	Socorro	LINEAR	·	4.7 km	MPC · JPL
150777	2001 QW_{263}	—	August 25, 2001	Anderson Mesa	LONEOS	·	2.2 km	MPC · JPL
150778	2001 QY_{267}	—	August 20, 2001	Socorro	LINEAR	V	1.0 km	MPC · JPL
150779	2001 QO_{268}	—	August 20, 2001	Palomar	NEAT	·	2.8 km	MPC · JPL
150780	2001 QM_{272}	—	August 19, 2001	Socorro	LINEAR	·	3.2 km	MPC · JPL
150781	2001 QO_{282}	—	August 19, 2001	Anderson Mesa	LONEOS	(1547)	4.1 km	MPC · JPL
150782	2001 QH_{291}	—	August 16, 2001	Socorro	LINEAR	MAR	2.2 km	MPC · JPL
150783	2001 QC_{328}	—	August 23, 2001	Palomar	NEAT	·	2.8 km	MPC · JPL
150784	2001 RG_{6}	—	September 9, 2001	Socorro	LINEAR	HNS	2.0 km	MPC · JPL
150785	2001 RJ_{19}	—	September 7, 2001	Socorro	LINEAR	·	1.8 km	MPC · JPL
150786	2001 RT_{19}	—	September 7, 2001	Socorro	LINEAR	·	1.1 km	MPC · JPL
150787	2001 RZ_{21}	—	September 7, 2001	Socorro	LINEAR	V	1.2 km	MPC · JPL
150788	2001 RT_{26}	—	September 7, 2001	Socorro	LINEAR	·	2.2 km	MPC · JPL
150789	2001 RM_{31}	—	September 7, 2001	Socorro	LINEAR	V	1.1 km	MPC · JPL
150790	2001 RM_{33}	—	September 8, 2001	Socorro	LINEAR	·	2.2 km	MPC · JPL
150791	2001 RB_{34}	—	September 8, 2001	Socorro	LINEAR	·	2.5 km	MPC · JPL
150792	2001 RT_{34}	—	September 8, 2001	Socorro	LINEAR	·	1.9 km	MPC · JPL
150793	2001 RJ_{38}	—	September 8, 2001	Socorro	LINEAR	NYS	1.3 km	MPC · JPL
150794	2001 RY_{43}	—	September 9, 2001	Palomar	NEAT	EUN	1.6 km	MPC · JPL
150795	2001 RR_{52}	—	September 12, 2001	Socorro	LINEAR	·	1.6 km	MPC · JPL
150796	2001 RO_{54}	—	September 12, 2001	Socorro	LINEAR	·	2.2 km	MPC · JPL
150797	2001 RW_{57}	—	September 12, 2001	Socorro	LINEAR	·	2.8 km	MPC · JPL
150798	2001 RO_{61}	—	September 12, 2001	Socorro	LINEAR	EUN	1.7 km	MPC · JPL
150799	2001 RZ_{62}	—	September 12, 2001	Socorro	LINEAR	·	1.8 km	MPC · JPL
150800	2001 RU_{74}	—	September 10, 2001	Socorro	LINEAR	·	2.0 km	MPC · JPL

== 150801–150900 ==
back to top

Designation			Discovery			Properties		Ref
Permanent	Provisional	Named after	Date	Site	Discoverer(s)	Category	Diam.	Ref
150801	2001 RF_{78}	—	September 10, 2001	Socorro	LINEAR	·	4.1 km	MPC · JPL
150802	2001 RW_{81}	—	September 14, 2001	Palomar	NEAT	·	4.2 km	MPC · JPL
150803	2001 RL_{83}	—	September 11, 2001	Anderson Mesa	LONEOS	·	2.3 km	MPC · JPL
150804	2001 RC_{88}	—	September 11, 2001	Anderson Mesa	LONEOS	(5)	1.8 km	MPC · JPL
150805	2001 RP_{88}	—	September 11, 2001	Anderson Mesa	LONEOS	·	2.4 km	MPC · JPL
150806	2001 RW_{91}	—	September 11, 2001	Anderson Mesa	LONEOS	MAS	1.1 km	MPC · JPL
150807	2001 RT_{95}	—	September 11, 2001	Kitt Peak	Spacewatch	CLA	1.9 km	MPC · JPL
150808	2001 RZ_{100}	—	September 12, 2001	Socorro	LINEAR	·	2.4 km	MPC · JPL
150809	2001 RM_{103}	—	September 12, 2001	Socorro	LINEAR	·	2.4 km	MPC · JPL
150810	2001 RN_{105}	—	September 12, 2001	Socorro	LINEAR	·	1.9 km	MPC · JPL
150811	2001 RX_{110}	—	September 12, 2001	Socorro	LINEAR	·	2.6 km	MPC · JPL
150812	2001 RA_{111}	—	September 12, 2001	Socorro	LINEAR	·	2.1 km	MPC · JPL
150813	2001 RK_{113}	—	September 12, 2001	Socorro	LINEAR	·	2.5 km	MPC · JPL
150814	2001 RB_{114}	—	September 12, 2001	Socorro	LINEAR	·	1.5 km	MPC · JPL
150815	2001 RH_{114}	—	September 12, 2001	Socorro	LINEAR	·	1.6 km	MPC · JPL
150816	2001 RS_{119}	—	September 12, 2001	Socorro	LINEAR	BRG	2.4 km	MPC · JPL
150817	2001 RN_{126}	—	September 12, 2001	Socorro	LINEAR	·	2.3 km	MPC · JPL
150818	2001 RZ_{126}	—	September 12, 2001	Socorro	LINEAR	V	1.5 km	MPC · JPL
150819	2001 RD_{127}	—	September 12, 2001	Socorro	LINEAR	·	1.8 km	MPC · JPL
150820	2001 RV_{127}	—	September 12, 2001	Socorro	LINEAR	·	1.1 km	MPC · JPL
150821	2001 RM_{131}	—	September 12, 2001	Socorro	LINEAR	·	2.5 km	MPC · JPL
150822	2001 RY_{142}	—	September 14, 2001	Palomar	NEAT	MAR	2.5 km	MPC · JPL
150823	2001 SZ_{2}	—	September 17, 2001	Desert Eagle	W. K. Y. Yeung	·	2.6 km	MPC · JPL
150824	2001 SL_{3}	—	September 17, 2001	Desert Eagle	W. K. Y. Yeung	·	2.6 km	MPC · JPL
150825	2001 SR_{8}	—	September 18, 2001	Kitt Peak	Spacewatch	·	1.7 km	MPC · JPL
150826	2001 SZ_{19}	—	September 16, 2001	Socorro	LINEAR	·	1.5 km	MPC · JPL
150827	2001 SL_{20}	—	September 16, 2001	Socorro	LINEAR	·	2.9 km	MPC · JPL
150828	2001 SJ_{21}	—	September 16, 2001	Socorro	LINEAR	·	2.8 km	MPC · JPL
150829	2001 SE_{24}	—	September 16, 2001	Socorro	LINEAR	·	1.5 km	MPC · JPL
150830	2001 SQ_{25}	—	September 16, 2001	Socorro	LINEAR	·	1.9 km	MPC · JPL
150831	2001 SP_{28}	—	September 16, 2001	Socorro	LINEAR	(5)	1.9 km	MPC · JPL
150832	2001 SM_{30}	—	September 16, 2001	Socorro	LINEAR	·	1.3 km	MPC · JPL
150833	2001 SE_{32}	—	September 16, 2001	Socorro	LINEAR	(5)	2.1 km	MPC · JPL
150834	2001 SZ_{32}	—	September 16, 2001	Socorro	LINEAR	MAS	1.3 km	MPC · JPL
150835	2001 SE_{34}	—	September 16, 2001	Socorro	LINEAR	MAR	1.6 km	MPC · JPL
150836	2001 SM_{34}	—	September 16, 2001	Socorro	LINEAR	·	1.5 km	MPC · JPL
150837	2001 SE_{40}	—	September 16, 2001	Socorro	LINEAR	·	2.1 km	MPC · JPL
150838	2001 SW_{45}	—	September 16, 2001	Socorro	LINEAR	·	1.4 km	MPC · JPL
150839	2001 SD_{47}	—	September 16, 2001	Socorro	LINEAR	·	1.5 km	MPC · JPL
150840	2001 SF_{47}	—	September 16, 2001	Socorro	LINEAR	·	1.5 km	MPC · JPL
150841	2001 SH_{52}	—	September 16, 2001	Socorro	LINEAR	(5)	1.8 km	MPC · JPL
150842	2001 SO_{55}	—	September 16, 2001	Socorro	LINEAR	·	2.2 km	MPC · JPL
150843	2001 SB_{58}	—	September 17, 2001	Socorro	LINEAR	·	2.8 km	MPC · JPL
150844	2001 SN_{66}	—	September 17, 2001	Socorro	LINEAR	·	3.1 km	MPC · JPL
150845	2001 SE_{68}	—	September 17, 2001	Socorro	LINEAR	ADE	3.2 km	MPC · JPL
150846	2001 SH_{69}	—	September 17, 2001	Socorro	LINEAR	(5)	2.1 km	MPC · JPL
150847	2001 SL_{69}	—	September 17, 2001	Socorro	LINEAR	·	2.9 km	MPC · JPL
150848	2001 SE_{74}	—	September 19, 2001	Anderson Mesa	LONEOS	·	2.5 km	MPC · JPL
150849	2001 SZ_{87}	—	September 20, 2001	Socorro	LINEAR	·	1.5 km	MPC · JPL
150850	2001 SB_{92}	—	September 20, 2001	Socorro	LINEAR	V	1.1 km	MPC · JPL
150851	2001 SY_{92}	—	September 20, 2001	Socorro	LINEAR	·	2.0 km	MPC · JPL
150852	2001 SD_{99}	—	September 20, 2001	Socorro	LINEAR	V	970 m	MPC · JPL
150853	2001 SL_{107}	—	September 20, 2001	Socorro	LINEAR	·	2.4 km	MPC · JPL
150854	2001 SG_{110}	—	September 20, 2001	Socorro	LINEAR	·	4.3 km	MPC · JPL
150855	2001 SW_{111}	—	September 20, 2001	Socorro	LINEAR	·	3.5 km	MPC · JPL
150856	2001 SS_{112}	—	September 18, 2001	Desert Eagle	W. K. Y. Yeung	·	2.2 km	MPC · JPL
150857	2001 SF_{120}	—	September 16, 2001	Socorro	LINEAR	·	1.7 km	MPC · JPL
150858	2001 SH_{130}	—	September 16, 2001	Socorro	LINEAR	(5)	1.5 km	MPC · JPL
150859	2001 SK_{130}	—	September 16, 2001	Socorro	LINEAR	·	1.9 km	MPC · JPL
150860	2001 SW_{137}	—	September 16, 2001	Socorro	LINEAR	·	2.1 km	MPC · JPL
150861	2001 SP_{140}	—	September 16, 2001	Socorro	LINEAR	·	2.1 km	MPC · JPL
150862	2001 SW_{140}	—	September 16, 2001	Socorro	LINEAR	(5)	1.8 km	MPC · JPL
150863	2001 SY_{140}	—	September 16, 2001	Socorro	LINEAR	·	1.4 km	MPC · JPL
150864	2001 SY_{147}	—	September 17, 2001	Socorro	LINEAR	·	1.8 km	MPC · JPL
150865	2001 SZ_{149}	—	September 17, 2001	Socorro	LINEAR	·	2.2 km	MPC · JPL
150866	2001 SS_{158}	—	September 17, 2001	Socorro	LINEAR	RAF	1.5 km	MPC · JPL
150867	2001 SS_{163}	—	September 17, 2001	Socorro	LINEAR	·	1.9 km	MPC · JPL
150868	2001 SK_{176}	—	September 16, 2001	Socorro	LINEAR	·	2.3 km	MPC · JPL
150869	2001 SH_{192}	—	September 19, 2001	Socorro	LINEAR	·	2.7 km	MPC · JPL
150870	2001 SP_{193}	—	September 19, 2001	Socorro	LINEAR	·	1.1 km	MPC · JPL
150871	2001 SM_{200}	—	September 19, 2001	Socorro	LINEAR	·	1.6 km	MPC · JPL
150872	2001 ST_{201}	—	September 19, 2001	Socorro	LINEAR	L5	10 km	MPC · JPL
150873	2001 SX_{206}	—	September 19, 2001	Socorro	LINEAR	NYS	1.7 km	MPC · JPL
150874	2001 SG_{209}	—	September 19, 2001	Socorro	LINEAR	·	2.3 km	MPC · JPL
150875	2001 SD_{213}	—	September 19, 2001	Socorro	LINEAR	·	1.4 km	MPC · JPL
150876	2001 SA_{220}	—	September 19, 2001	Socorro	LINEAR	L5	10 km	MPC · JPL
150877	2001 SK_{226}	—	September 19, 2001	Socorro	LINEAR	·	3.5 km	MPC · JPL
150878	2001 SE_{227}	—	September 19, 2001	Socorro	LINEAR	V	1.4 km	MPC · JPL
150879	2001 SQ_{233}	—	September 19, 2001	Socorro	LINEAR	·	2.1 km	MPC · JPL
150880	2001 SR_{234}	—	September 19, 2001	Socorro	LINEAR	·	2.8 km	MPC · JPL
150881	2001 SB_{237}	—	September 19, 2001	Socorro	LINEAR	·	2.0 km	MPC · JPL
150882	2001 SY_{238}	—	September 19, 2001	Socorro	LINEAR	·	1.7 km	MPC · JPL
150883	2001 SE_{242}	—	September 19, 2001	Socorro	LINEAR	EUN	1.8 km	MPC · JPL
150884	2001 SY_{242}	—	September 19, 2001	Socorro	LINEAR	NYS	1.5 km	MPC · JPL
150885	2001 SF_{244}	—	September 19, 2001	Socorro	LINEAR	·	2.1 km	MPC · JPL
150886	2001 SK_{248}	—	September 19, 2001	Socorro	LINEAR	·	2.3 km	MPC · JPL
150887	2001 SY_{248}	—	September 19, 2001	Socorro	LINEAR	·	2.1 km	MPC · JPL
150888	2001 SD_{254}	—	September 19, 2001	Socorro	LINEAR	MAS	1.2 km	MPC · JPL
150889	2001 ST_{257}	—	September 20, 2001	Socorro	LINEAR	·	2.0 km	MPC · JPL
150890	2001 SN_{267}	—	September 25, 2001	Desert Eagle	W. K. Y. Yeung	·	3.0 km	MPC · JPL
150891	2001 SQ_{272}	—	September 21, 2001	Socorro	LINEAR	·	1.6 km	MPC · JPL
150892	2001 SA_{278}	—	September 21, 2001	Anderson Mesa	LONEOS	·	2.6 km	MPC · JPL
150893	2001 SK_{278}	—	September 21, 2001	Anderson Mesa	LONEOS	·	2.0 km	MPC · JPL
150894	2001 SV_{278}	—	September 21, 2001	Anderson Mesa	LONEOS	EUN	2.9 km	MPC · JPL
150895	2001 SU_{282}	—	September 22, 2001	Socorro	LINEAR	EUN	3.3 km	MPC · JPL
150896	2001 SC_{290}	—	September 29, 2001	Palomar	NEAT	EUN	1.7 km	MPC · JPL
150897	2001 SU_{292}	—	September 16, 2001	Socorro	LINEAR	·	1.8 km	MPC · JPL
150898	2001 SW_{304}	—	September 20, 2001	Socorro	LINEAR	·	1.7 km	MPC · JPL
150899	2001 SJ_{307}	—	September 21, 2001	Socorro	LINEAR	NYS	2.4 km	MPC · JPL
150900	2001 SL_{315}	—	September 25, 2001	Socorro	LINEAR	MAR	2.4 km	MPC · JPL

== 150901–151000 ==
back to top

Designation			Discovery			Properties		Ref
Permanent	Provisional	Named after	Date	Site	Discoverer(s)	Category	Diam.	Ref
150901	2001 SB_{318}	—	September 19, 2001	Socorro	LINEAR	·	1.6 km	MPC · JPL
150902	2001 SW_{323}	—	September 25, 2001	Socorro	LINEAR	·	1.8 km	MPC · JPL
150903	2001 SN_{341}	—	September 21, 2001	Desert Eagle	W. K. Y. Yeung	(5)	1.4 km	MPC · JPL
150904	2001 SX_{347}	—	September 26, 2001	Socorro	LINEAR	·	2.3 km	MPC · JPL
150905	2001 SG_{353}	—	September 18, 2001	Kitt Peak	Spacewatch	·	2.3 km	MPC · JPL
150906	2001 TF	—	October 8, 2001	Socorro	LINEAR	·	3.4 km	MPC · JPL
150907	2001 TA_{3}	—	October 7, 2001	Palomar	NEAT	·	2.2 km	MPC · JPL
150908	2001 TV_{4}	—	October 8, 2001	Palomar	NEAT	·	2.3 km	MPC · JPL
150909	2001 TZ_{11}	—	October 13, 2001	Socorro	LINEAR	·	3.0 km	MPC · JPL
150910	2001 TV_{24}	—	October 14, 2001	Socorro	LINEAR	EUN	2.7 km	MPC · JPL
150911	2001 TO_{26}	—	October 14, 2001	Socorro	LINEAR	·	1.5 km	MPC · JPL
150912	2001 TT_{28}	—	October 14, 2001	Socorro	LINEAR	·	2.4 km	MPC · JPL
150913	2001 TV_{31}	—	October 14, 2001	Socorro	LINEAR	·	3.0 km	MPC · JPL
150914	2001 TR_{38}	—	October 14, 2001	Socorro	LINEAR	·	2.7 km	MPC · JPL
150915	2001 TN_{39}	—	October 14, 2001	Socorro	LINEAR	·	4.4 km	MPC · JPL
150916	2001 TP_{43}	—	October 14, 2001	Socorro	LINEAR	·	7.2 km	MPC · JPL
150917	2001 TD_{44}	—	October 14, 2001	Socorro	LINEAR	EUN	2.9 km	MPC · JPL
150918	2001 TO_{54}	—	October 14, 2001	Socorro	LINEAR	·	1.8 km	MPC · JPL
150919	2001 TT_{54}	—	October 14, 2001	Socorro	LINEAR	EUN	1.6 km	MPC · JPL
150920	2001 TQ_{57}	—	October 13, 2001	Socorro	LINEAR	(5)	1.9 km	MPC · JPL
150921	2001 TC_{58}	—	October 13, 2001	Socorro	LINEAR	·	1.9 km	MPC · JPL
150922	2001 TK_{61}	—	October 13, 2001	Socorro	LINEAR	·	2.1 km	MPC · JPL
150923	2001 TL_{61}	—	October 13, 2001	Socorro	LINEAR	(5)	1.6 km	MPC · JPL
150924	2001 TP_{62}	—	October 13, 2001	Socorro	LINEAR	(5)	2.4 km	MPC · JPL
150925	2001 TT_{62}	—	October 13, 2001	Socorro	LINEAR	·	3.8 km	MPC · JPL
150926	2001 TW_{62}	—	October 13, 2001	Socorro	LINEAR	·	2.3 km	MPC · JPL
150927	2001 TL_{67}	—	October 13, 2001	Socorro	LINEAR	SUL	4.9 km	MPC · JPL
150928	2001 TP_{68}	—	October 13, 2001	Socorro	LINEAR	·	3.5 km	MPC · JPL
150929	2001 TE_{69}	—	October 13, 2001	Socorro	LINEAR	·	2.1 km	MPC · JPL
150930	2001 TE_{71}	—	October 13, 2001	Socorro	LINEAR	EUN	2.3 km	MPC · JPL
150931	2001 TN_{72}	—	October 13, 2001	Socorro	LINEAR	·	2.6 km	MPC · JPL
150932	2001 TO_{72}	—	October 13, 2001	Socorro	LINEAR	·	3.3 km	MPC · JPL
150933	2001 TU_{74}	—	October 13, 2001	Socorro	LINEAR	·	1.5 km	MPC · JPL
150934	2001 TL_{78}	—	October 13, 2001	Socorro	LINEAR	·	2.1 km	MPC · JPL
150935	2001 TT_{78}	—	October 13, 2001	Socorro	LINEAR	·	3.3 km	MPC · JPL
150936	2001 TC_{81}	—	October 14, 2001	Socorro	LINEAR	·	2.3 km	MPC · JPL
150937	2001 TJ_{83}	—	October 14, 2001	Socorro	LINEAR	·	1.9 km	MPC · JPL
150938	2001 TK_{92}	—	October 14, 2001	Socorro	LINEAR	AGN	1.6 km	MPC · JPL
150939	2001 TX_{97}	—	October 14, 2001	Socorro	LINEAR	·	1.6 km	MPC · JPL
150940	2001 TL_{100}	—	October 14, 2001	Socorro	LINEAR	V	1.5 km	MPC · JPL
150941	2001 TN_{100}	—	October 14, 2001	Socorro	LINEAR	·	1.9 km	MPC · JPL
150942	2001 TU_{102}	—	October 15, 2001	Socorro	LINEAR	·	3.5 km	MPC · JPL
150943	2001 TZ_{104}	—	October 13, 2001	Socorro	LINEAR	·	2.2 km	MPC · JPL
150944	2001 TB_{106}	—	October 13, 2001	Socorro	LINEAR	MAR	3.9 km	MPC · JPL
150945	2001 TS_{106}	—	October 13, 2001	Socorro	LINEAR	·	2.7 km	MPC · JPL
150946	2001 TK_{110}	—	October 14, 2001	Socorro	LINEAR	·	2.4 km	MPC · JPL
150947	2001 TP_{112}	—	October 14, 2001	Socorro	LINEAR	·	2.4 km	MPC · JPL
150948	2001 TR_{117}	—	October 14, 2001	Socorro	LINEAR	·	3.8 km	MPC · JPL
150949	2001 TS_{118}	—	October 15, 2001	Socorro	LINEAR	EUN	1.8 km	MPC · JPL
150950	2001 TK_{121}	—	October 15, 2001	Socorro	LINEAR	·	2.7 km	MPC · JPL
150951	2001 TP_{121}	—	October 15, 2001	Socorro	LINEAR	·	2.5 km	MPC · JPL
150952	2001 TU_{124}	—	October 12, 2001	Haleakala	NEAT	DOR	4.3 km	MPC · JPL
150953	2001 TM_{125}	—	October 12, 2001	Haleakala	NEAT	·	2.4 km	MPC · JPL
150954	2001 TH_{126}	—	October 13, 2001	Kitt Peak	Spacewatch	·	1.3 km	MPC · JPL
150955	2001 TT_{131}	—	October 11, 2001	Palomar	NEAT	·	3.9 km	MPC · JPL
150956	2001 TZ_{132}	—	October 12, 2001	Haleakala	NEAT	·	2.3 km	MPC · JPL
150957	2001 TS_{140}	—	October 10, 2001	Palomar	NEAT	AGN	1.8 km	MPC · JPL
150958	2001 TR_{142}	—	October 10, 2001	Palomar	NEAT	·	3.6 km	MPC · JPL
150959	2001 TL_{143}	—	October 10, 2001	Palomar	NEAT	·	2.0 km	MPC · JPL
150960	2001 TA_{150}	—	October 10, 2001	Palomar	NEAT	AGN	1.8 km	MPC · JPL
150961	2001 TL_{158}	—	October 11, 2001	Palomar	NEAT	(5)	1.5 km	MPC · JPL
150962	2001 TA_{161}	—	October 11, 2001	Palomar	NEAT	(5)	1.6 km	MPC · JPL
150963	2001 TG_{162}	—	October 11, 2001	Palomar	NEAT	·	1.9 km	MPC · JPL
150964	2001 TX_{162}	—	October 11, 2001	Palomar	NEAT	·	1.8 km	MPC · JPL
150965	2001 TY_{164}	—	October 15, 2001	Palomar	NEAT	·	2.3 km	MPC · JPL
150966	2001 TL_{167}	—	October 15, 2001	Socorro	LINEAR	BRG	2.8 km	MPC · JPL
150967	2001 TG_{169}	—	October 15, 2001	Socorro	LINEAR	·	3.2 km	MPC · JPL
150968	2001 TQ_{169}	—	October 15, 2001	Socorro	LINEAR	MAR	2.0 km	MPC · JPL
150969	2001 TQ_{172}	—	October 13, 2001	Socorro	LINEAR	·	1.5 km	MPC · JPL
150970	2001 TG_{179}	—	October 14, 2001	Socorro	LINEAR	·	2.6 km	MPC · JPL
150971	2001 TJ_{191}	—	October 14, 2001	Socorro	LINEAR	·	2.7 km	MPC · JPL
150972	2001 TH_{195}	—	October 15, 2001	Palomar	NEAT	ADE	2.5 km	MPC · JPL
150973	2001 TO_{195}	—	October 15, 2001	Palomar	NEAT	KRM	3.7 km	MPC · JPL
150974	2001 TP_{196}	—	October 14, 2001	Haleakala	NEAT	·	2.8 km	MPC · JPL
150975	2001 TV_{196}	—	October 15, 2001	Haleakala	NEAT	EUN	1.9 km	MPC · JPL
150976	2001 TN_{210}	—	October 13, 2001	Anderson Mesa	LONEOS	V	1.2 km	MPC · JPL
150977	2001 TY_{212}	—	October 13, 2001	Anderson Mesa	LONEOS	·	2.2 km	MPC · JPL
150978	2001 TN_{214}	—	October 13, 2001	Palomar	NEAT	ADE	2.7 km	MPC · JPL
150979	2001 TR_{214}	—	October 13, 2001	Palomar	NEAT	·	2.0 km	MPC · JPL
150980	2001 TC_{216}	—	October 13, 2001	Palomar	NEAT	EUN	2.3 km	MPC · JPL
150981	2001 TX_{220}	—	October 14, 2001	Socorro	LINEAR	·	2.5 km	MPC · JPL
150982	2001 TV_{225}	—	October 14, 2001	Anderson Mesa	LONEOS	JUN	1.4 km	MPC · JPL
150983	2001 TM_{229}	—	October 15, 2001	Socorro	LINEAR	EUN	1.8 km	MPC · JPL
150984	2001 TP_{233}	—	October 15, 2001	Haleakala	NEAT	·	3.4 km	MPC · JPL
150985	2001 TB_{235}	—	October 15, 2001	Haleakala	NEAT	·	2.4 km	MPC · JPL
150986	2001 TL_{239}	—	October 15, 2001	Palomar	NEAT	·	2.1 km	MPC · JPL
150987	2001 TT_{240}	—	October 14, 2001	Socorro	LINEAR	EUN	1.8 km	MPC · JPL
150988	2001 TU_{241}	—	October 13, 2001	Anderson Mesa	LONEOS	·	3.5 km	MPC · JPL
150989	2001 UL_{4}	—	October 17, 2001	Desert Eagle	W. K. Y. Yeung	MIS	4.1 km	MPC · JPL
150990	2001 UC_{8}	—	October 17, 2001	Socorro	LINEAR	·	3.0 km	MPC · JPL
150991	2001 UF_{8}	—	October 17, 2001	Socorro	LINEAR	·	2.6 km	MPC · JPL
150992	2001 UD_{13}	—	October 24, 2001	Desert Eagle	W. K. Y. Yeung	·	2.3 km	MPC · JPL
150993	2001 UK_{15}	—	October 25, 2001	Desert Eagle	W. K. Y. Yeung	(5)	1.6 km	MPC · JPL
150994	2001 UL_{23}	—	October 18, 2001	Socorro	LINEAR	MAR	2.0 km	MPC · JPL
150995	2001 UX_{23}	—	October 18, 2001	Socorro	LINEAR	·	2.4 km	MPC · JPL
150996	2001 UR_{28}	—	October 16, 2001	Socorro	LINEAR	·	1.8 km	MPC · JPL
150997	2001 UF_{32}	—	October 16, 2001	Socorro	LINEAR	·	2.1 km	MPC · JPL
150998	2001 UC_{34}	—	October 16, 2001	Socorro	LINEAR	·	2.8 km	MPC · JPL
150999	2001 UT_{35}	—	October 16, 2001	Socorro	LINEAR	·	2.7 km	MPC · JPL
151000	2001 UB_{37}	—	October 16, 2001	Socorro	LINEAR	·	2.9 km	MPC · JPL

back to top

== See also ==
- Meanings of minor-planet names: 150001–151000
