= Mount Kanmuri =

Mount Kanmuri (冠山, Kanmuri-yama, Kammuri-yama) is the name of several mountains in Japan.

- Mount Kanmuri (Gifu, Fukui), located on the borders of Gifu and Fukui prefectures with a height of 1,256.6 m (4,123 ft)
- Mount Kanmuri (Ehime, Kōchi), located on the borders of Ehime and Kōchi prefectures at the origin of the Dōzan River
- Mount Kanmuri (Hatsukaichi, Hiroshima), located in Hatsukaichi, Hiroshima Prefecture with a height of 1,339 m (4,393 ft)
- Mount Kanmuri (Kanagawa), located in Hakone, Kanagawa, Japan

== See also ==
- Mount Kammuri
