= Besshi copper mine =

Copper mine in Ehime prefecture, Japan

Coordinates: 33°51′55″N 133°19′41″E

Besshi Dōzan
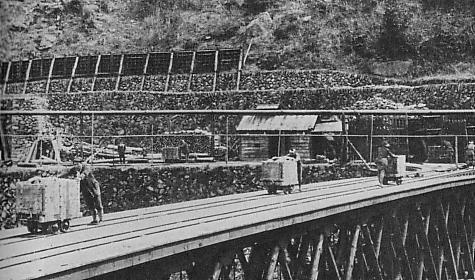
- Interactive map of Besshi Dōzan
- Location: Niihama, Ehime Prefecture, Japan
- Products: Copper
- Opened: 1691
- Closed: 1973
- Company: Sumitomo Group

The Besshi copper mine (別子銅山, Besshi dōzan) was a rich source of copper in Niihama, Ehime Prefecture, Japan. The deposits were discovered in 1690, and copper mining began in the following year.

It was the world's No. 1 copper producing mine in the latter half of the 1690s and changed a small fishing and farming village into a major industrial city on Shikoku. From 1691 until the closing of the mine in 1973, Besshi produced about 700,000 tons of copper, and contributed to Japan's trade and modernization. The Sumitomo family managed the mine, which helped build the Sumitomo zaibatsu. The Dōzan River was named after the copper mine.

The Minetopia Besshi theme park uses some of the mine's facilities.
