= Dōzan River =

Coordinates: 33°55′42.26″N 133°31′25.6″E

Dōzan River 銅山川
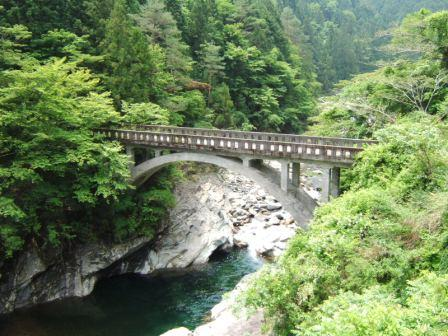

Location
- Country: Japan

Physical characteristics
- Source
  - location: Mount Kanmuri
  - elevation: 1,732 m (5,682 ft)
- Mouth
  - location: Yoshino River
- Length: 55 km (34 mi)
- Basin size: 280 km^{2} (110 sq mi)
- Discharge
  - average: 500 m^{3}/s (18,000 cu ft/s)

The Dōzan River (銅山川, Dōzan-gawa) is the largest branch of the Yoshino River and flows through Ehime and Tokushima prefectures in Japan. Its name was derived from the Besshi copper mine that is now closed. In Tokushima Prefecture, it is called the Iyo River (伊予川 Iyo-gawa).

== Geography ==
The river originates Mount Kanmuri on the borders of Ehime and Kōchi prefectures. It then flows through Shikokuchūō in Ehime Prefecture and Miyoshi in Tokushima Prefecture, before joining the Yoshino River.

== History ==
In 1900, poisonous substances from the various minerals excavated at the nearby copper mine seeped into the river, poisoning the local populations downstream.
