= Bauhinia (disambiguation) =

Bauhinia may refer to:

- Bauhinia, a genus of flowering plants
- Bauhinia, Queensland, a town in Australia
- Bauhinia Garden, a public housing estate in Tseung Kwan O, Hong Kong
- Shire of Bauhinia, a former local government area in Queensland, Australia
- BAUHINIA, callsign of Hong Kong Airlines
- MV ASL Bauhinia, a Chinese-owned container ship
- 151997 Bauhinia, an asteroid
