= William Kwong Yu Yeung =

Hong Kong-born Canadian astronomer (born 1960)

Minor planets discovered: 2,031
see § List of discovered minor planets

William Kwong Yu Yeung (also known simply as Bill Yeung; Chinese: 楊光宇; born 1960) is a Hong Kong-born Canadian amateur astronomer with telescopes based in the United States.

He is a prolific discoverer of asteroids and also discovered the comet 172P/Yeung. He also discovered the object J002E3, which was first thought to be an asteroid, but is now known to be part of the Saturn V Rocket that propelled Apollo 12 into space. He worked first from "Rock Finder Observatory" (IAU code 652) in Calgary, Alberta, and now works from Arizona's Desert Beaver Observatory (919) and Desert Eagle Observatory (333).

== Awards and honors ==
The outer main-belt asteroid 40776 Yeungkwongyu, discovered by astronomer Roy Tucker at Goodricke-Pigott Observatory (683) in 1999, was named in his honor. The official naming citation was published by the Minor Planet Center on 9 June 2017 (M.P.C. 105279).

== List of discovered minor planets ==
Yeung is one of the most prolific discoverers of minor planets, credited by the Minor Planet Center with more than 2,000 numbered minor planets. The list below gives most of his discoveries in groups of 50 bodies, sorted by ascending number.

19848 Yeungchuchiu	2 October 2000	list
20760 Chanmatchun	27 February 2000	list
20887 Ngwaikin	18 November 2000	list
22136 Jamesharrison	1 November 2000	list
22183 Canonlau	23 December 2000	list
23257 Denny	29 December 2000	list
23258 Tsuihark	29 December 2000	list
25750 Miwnay	28 January 2000	list
25811 Richardteo	26 February 2000	list
25893 Sugihara	19 November 2000	list
25930 Spielberg	21 February 2001	list
26713 Iusukyin	13 April 2001	list
26732 Damianpeach	22 April 2001	list
26733 Nanavisitor	22 April 2001	list
26734 Terryfarrell	23 April 2001	list
26738 Lishizhen	28 April 2001	list
26743 Laichinglung	30 April 2001	list
27596 Maldives	16 February 2001	list
28963 Tamyiu	29 March 2001	list
28966 Yuyingshih	26 April 2001	list
28980 Chowyunfat	15 June 2001	list
32605 Lucy	23 August 2001	list
32613 Tseyuenman	27 August 2001	list
32618 Leungkamcheung	31 August 2001	list
32622 Yuewaichun	11 September 2001	list

34420 Peterpau	23 September 2000	list
34636 Lauwingkai	1 November 2000	list
34760 Ciccone	26 August 2001	list
34778 Huhunglick	10 September 2001	list
34779 Chungchiyung	10 September 2001	list
34789 Brucemckean	17 September 2001	list
34792 Hsiehcheching	20 September 2001	list
34815 Wongfaye	20 September 2001	list
34816 Billybarr	20 September 2001	list
34838 Lazowski	21 September 2001	list
34840 Lawwaikuen	25 September 2001	list
34841 Ruthgottesman	25 September 2001	list
34859 Lamshanmuk	15 October 2001	list
34871 Howaiho	18 October 2001	list
37117 Narcissus	1 November 2000	list
37139 Richardmuller	1 November 2000	list
(37154) 2000 VZ_{58}	8 November 2000	list
(37159) 2000 WX	17 November 2000	list
(37358) 2001 UM_{10}	18 October 2001	list
(37359) 2001 UM_{17}	25 October 2001	list
38821 Linchinghsia	9 September 2000	list
38960 Yeungchihung	2 October 2000	list
38962 Chuwinghung	5 October 2000	list
38980 Gaoyaojie	23 October 2000	list
(39067) 2000 VG_{3}	1 November 2000	list

(39137) 2000 WX_{62}	26 November 2000	list
(39291) 2001 DG	16 February 2001	list
39300 Auyeungsungfan	30 April 2001	list
39332 Lauwaiming	11 January 2002	list
(39337) 2002 AZ_{13}	12 January 2002	list
(39362) 2002 BU_{1}	21 January 2002	list
39372 Wongtzewah	12 February 2002	list
(41575) 2000 ST_{1}	20 September 2000	list
(41662) 2000 TB	1 October 2000	list
(41676) 2000 UR_{2}	24 October 2000	list
(41684) 2000 UL_{15}	25 October 2000	list
(41716) 2000 UP_{76}	29 October 2000	list
41740 Yuenkwokyung	1 November 2000	list
(41741) 2000 VG	1 November 2000	list
41742 Wongkakui	1 November 2000	list
(41902) 2000 WA_{128}	18 November 2000	list
(41975) 2000 YU_{12}	23 December 2000	list
41981 Yaobeina	28 December 2000	list
(41982) 2000 YE_{21}	29 December 2000	list
(42246) 2001 FX_{121}	29 March 2001	list
(42275) 2001 RG_{17}	11 September 2001	list
(42278) 2001 SH_{265}	25 September 2001	list
(42279) 2001 SP_{267}	25 September 2001	list
(42280) 2001 SS_{267}	25 September 2001	list
(42281) 2001 SW_{267}	25 September 2001	list

(42293) 2001 UZ_{3}	17 October 2001	list
(42294) 2001 UP_{5}	21 October 2001	list
42295 Teresateng	23 October 2001	list
(42378) 2002 EL_{12}	14 March 2002	list
(43427) 2000 YS_{12}	23 December 2000	list
43597 Changshaopo	31 August 2001	list
(43603) 2001 UQ_{13}	24 October 2001	list
(43611) 2002 AV_{128}	14 January 2002	list
(43658) 2002 FV	18 March 2002	list
(43659) 2002 FJ_{1}	18 March 2002	list
(43660) 2002 FQ_{2}	19 March 2002	list
(43661) 2002 FY_{2}	19 March 2002	list
(43668) 2002 GH_{7}	14 April 2002	list
(43677) 2002 HN	16 April 2002	list
(43678) 2002 HP	16 April 2002	list
(43680) 2002 HE_{7}	18 April 2002	list
(43681) 2002 JG_{2}	4 May 2002	list
(43683) 2002 JF_{12}	4 May 2002	list
(45876) 2000 WD_{27}	26 November 2000	list
(45890) 2000 WS_{169}	26 November 2000	list
(45901) 2000 YH_{16}	23 December 2000	list
(46042) 2001 DK_{54}	21 February 2001	list
(46072) 2001 EJ	2 March 2001	list
(46168) 2001 FK_{86}	27 March 2001	list
(46232) 2001 HS_{7}	17 April 2001	list

(46244) 2001 HU_{15}	24 April 2001	list
(46249) 2001 HQ_{22}	25 April 2001	list
(46251) 2001 HO_{31}	26 April 2001	list
(46346) 2001 SX_{112}	18 September 2001	list
(46352) 2001 SZ_{266}	25 September 2001	list
(46353) 2001 TY_{7}	11 October 2001	list
(46396) 2002 CD_{39}	9 February 2002	list
(46416) 2002 HK	16 April 2002	list
(46417) 2002 JV_{4}	4 May 2002	list
(46418) 2002 JS_{12}	6 May 2002	list
(46419) 2002 JO_{21}	9 May 2002	list
(48004) 2001 BS_{61}	31 January 2001	list
(48053) 2001 EL	2 March 2001	list
(48054) 2001 EM	2 March 2001	list
(48132) 2001 FA_{122}	29 March 2001	list
(48135) 2001 FC_{128}	31 March 2001	list
(48162) 2001 HX_{3}	17 April 2001	list
(48175) 2001 HB_{23}	26 April 2001	list
(48178) 2001 HU_{31}	28 April 2001	list
(48179) 2001 HY_{31}	28 April 2001	list
(48290) 2002 JH	3 May 2002	list
(48291) 2002 JQ_{1}	4 May 2002	list
(48297) 2002 LJ_{24}	9 June 2002	list
50412 Ewen	26 February 2000	list
(51501) 2001 FN_{86}	27 March 2001	list

(51525) 2001 FZ_{121}	29 March 2001	list
51529 Marksimpson	31 March 2001	list
(51532) 2001 FN_{130}	31 March 2001	list
(51626) 2001 HJ_{38}	30 April 2001	list
(51627) 2001 HK_{38}	30 April 2001	list
(51656) 2001 JD	1 May 2001	list
(51771) 2001 MH	16 June 2001	list
(51984) 2001 SS_{115}	17 September 2001	list
(51988) 2001 SV_{265}	25 September 2001	list
(52076) 2002 RE_{29}	3 September 2002	list
(53634) 2000 DF_{1}	26 February 2000	list
(54714) 2001 HB_{38}	26 April 2001	list
(54734) 2001 KF_{20}	23 May 2001	list
(54793) 2001 MD_{10}	24 June 2001	list
(54845) 2001 OF_{3}	19 July 2001	list
(54887) 2001 OG_{63}	26 July 2001	list
(55070) 2001 QZ_{85}	22 August 2001	list
(55194) 2001 RP_{11}	10 September 2001	list
(55197) 2001 RN_{17}	11 September 2001	list
(55273) 2001 SY	17 September 2001	list
(55274) 2001 SN_{3}	17 September 2001	list
(55275) 2001 SX_{9}	18 September 2001	list
55330 Shekwaihung	20 September 2001	list
55381 Lautakwah	25 September 2001	list
55382 Kootinlok	25 September 2001	list

55383 Cheungkwokwing	25 September 2001	list
55384 Muiyimfong	25 September 2001	list
(55426) 2001 TL_{45}	14 October 2001	list
(55432) 2001 TR_{56}	15 October 2001	list
(55479) 2001 UO_{15}	25 October 2001	list
(57220) 2001 QG_{72}	21 August 2001	list
(57250) 2001 QQ_{94}	23 August 2001	list
(57264) 2001 QP_{113}	23 August 2001	list
(57288) 2001 QZ_{163}	31 August 2001	list
(57321) 2001 QV_{239}	24 August 2001	list
(57361) 2001 RE_{17}	11 September 2001	list
(57371) 2001 RB_{48}	10 September 2001	list
(57372) 2001 RK_{48}	11 September 2001	list
(57415) 2001 SD_{1}	17 September 2001	list
(57416) 2001 SL_{1}	17 September 2001	list
(57417) 2001 ST_{1}	17 September 2001	list
(57422) 2001 SR_{9}	18 September 2001	list
(57469) 2001 SA_{115}	20 September 2001	list
(57504) 2001 SL_{265}	25 September 2001	list
(57505) 2001 SK_{266}	25 September 2001	list
(57506) 2001 SK_{268}	25 September 2001	list
(57507) 2001 SM_{268}	26 September 2001	list
(57539) 2001 TU_{17}	14 October 2001	list
(57540) 2001 TE_{18}	14 October 2001	list
(57559) 2001 TY_{46}	15 October 2001	list

(57560) 2001 TB_{47}	15 October 2001	list
(57562) 2001 TS_{48}	15 October 2001	list
(57659) 2001 UP_{4}	18 October 2001	list
(57660) 2001 UY_{6}	18 October 2001	list
(57661) 2001 UQ_{12}	24 October 2001	list
(57662) 2001 UJ_{13}	24 October 2001	list
(57663) 2001 UA_{15}	24 October 2001	list
(62034) 2000 RE_{60}	8 September 2000	list
(62130) 2000 SS_{1}	20 September 2000	list
(62667) 2000 TC	1 October 2000	list
(62853) 2000 UO_{76}	27 October 2000	list
(62914) 2000 VX_{2}	1 November 2000	list
(62915) 2000 VY_{2}	1 November 2000	list
(62984) 2000 VV_{59}	1 November 2000	list
(63117) 2000 WJ_{169}	26 November 2000	list
(63296) 2001 EK	2 March 2001	list
(63366) 2001 HK_{4}	17 April 2001	list
(63368) 2001 HQ_{7}	17 April 2001	list
(63369) 2001 HT_{7}	17 April 2001	list
(63427) 2001 MB	16 June 2001	list
(63608) 2001 QD_{72}	21 August 2001	list
(63640) 2001 QM_{94}	23 August 2001	list
(63652) 2001 QG_{108}	23 August 2001	list
(63684) 2001 QL_{152}	25 August 2001	list
(63685) 2001 QT_{152}	26 August 2001	list

(63720) 2001 QS_{228}	24 August 2001	list
(63748) 2001 QH_{263}	25 August 2001	list
(63782) 2001 RU_{6}	10 September 2001	list
(63785) 2001 RM_{11}	10 September 2001	list
(63786) 2001 RO_{11}	10 September 2001	list
63787 Michelmaurette	11 September 2001	list
63788 Jonlarsen	11 September 2001	list
(63816) 2001 RC_{48}	10 September 2001	list
(63818) 2001 RV_{63}	11 September 2001	list
(63884) 2001 SF_{1}	17 September 2001	list
(63885) 2001 SU_{2}	17 September 2001	list
(63886) 2001 SY_{2}	17 September 2001	list
(63887) 2001 SH_{3}	17 September 2001	list
(63888) 2001 SJ_{3}	17 September 2001	list
(63889) 2001 SK_{3}	17 September 2001	list
(63999) 2001 SD_{113}	18 September 2001	list
(64000) 2001 SD_{115}	20 September 2001	list
(64002) 2001 SO_{116}	18 September 2001	list
(64061) 2001 SG_{265}	25 September 2001	list
(64062) 2001 SB_{266}	25 September 2001	list
(64063) 2001 SD_{267}	25 September 2001	list
(64064) 2001 SC_{268}	25 September 2001	list
(64065) 2001 SF_{268}	25 September 2001	list
(64066) 2001 SJ_{268}	25 September 2001	list
(64106) 2001 TT_{7}	11 October 2001	list

(64116) 2001 TX_{13}	11 October 2001	list
(64119) 2001 TX_{17}	14 October 2001	list
(64120) 2001 TF_{18}	14 October 2001	list
(64121) 2001 TG_{18}	14 October 2001	list
(64122) 2001 TL_{18}	14 October 2001	list
(64164) 2001 TL_{49}	15 October 2001	list
(64171) 2001 TQ_{56}	14 October 2001	list
(64210) 2001 TC_{104}	15 October 2001	list
(64282) 2001 UO_{5}	21 October 2001	list
(64283) 2001 UV_{5}	21 October 2001	list
(64285) 2001 UN_{6}	17 October 2001	list
64288 Lamchiuying	18 October 2001	list
64289 Shihwingching	22 October 2001	list
64290 Yaushingtung	22 October 2001	list
64291 Anglee	23 October 2001	list
(64292) 2001 UF_{13}	24 October 2001	list
(64293) 2001 UK_{13}	24 October 2001	list
(64294) 2001 UO_{13}	24 October 2001	list
64295 Tangtisheng	24 October 2001	list
64296 Hokoon	24 October 2001	list
(64298) 2001 UE_{15}	24 October 2001	list
(64299) 2001 UF_{15}	24 October 2001	list
(64300) 2001 UH_{16}	25 October 2001	list
(64704) 2001 XJ_{88}	14 December 2001	list
(64972) 2002 AT_{9}	11 January 2002	list

(64973) 2002 AC_{10}	11 January 2002	list
(65038) 2002 AT_{128}	14 January 2002	list
(65039) 2002 AK_{129}	14 January 2002	list
(65115) 2002 CK_{50}	12 February 2002	list
(65116) 2002 CH_{51}	12 February 2002	list
(65117) 2002 CW_{51}	12 February 2002	list
(65118) 2002 CD_{52}	12 February 2002	list
(65214) 2002 EV_{12}	14 March 2002	list
(65247) 2002 FR	18 March 2002	list
(65248) 2002 FN_{4}	20 March 2002	list
(65289) 2002 JX	3 May 2002	list
(67741) 2000 UZ_{33}	30 October 2000	list
(67824) 2000 VB_{39}	1 November 2000	list
(68025) 2000 YV_{21}	29 December 2000	list
(68107) 2000 YG_{132}	30 December 2000	list
(68115) 2001 AA_{2}	3 January 2001	list
(68192) 2001 BV_{61}	31 January 2001	list
(68223) 2001 DJ	16 February 2001	list
(68398) 2001 QV_{85}	22 August 2001	list
(68427) 2001 RK_{6}	10 September 2001	list
(68431) 2001 RH_{48}	11 September 2001	list
(68470) 2001 SP_{266}	25 September 2001	list
(68480) 2001 TQ_{49}	15 October 2001	list
(68491) 2001 UF_{4}	17 October 2001	list
(68492) 2001 UH_{4}	17 October 2001	list

(68587) 2002 AD_{10}	11 January 2002	list
(68588) 2002 AF_{10}	11 January 2002	list
(68589) 2002 AG_{10}	11 January 2002	list
(68622) 2002 BQ	21 January 2002	list
(68633) 2002 CY_{13}	8 February 2002	list
(68634) 2002 CY_{14}	9 February 2002	list
(68644) 2002 CX_{50}	12 February 2002	list
(68650) 2002 CP_{59}	13 February 2002	list
(68674) 2002 CV_{117}	12 February 2002	list
(68727) 2002 EH_{6}	12 March 2002	list
(68729) 2002 EG_{12}	14 March 2002	list
(68777) 2002 FD_{1}	18 March 2002	list
(68778) 2002 FO_{2}	19 March 2002	list
(68780) 2002 FQ_{3}	18 March 2002	list
(68794) 2002 GZ_{6}	12 April 2002	list
(68795) 2002 GE_{9}	15 April 2002	list
(68796) 2002 GF_{9}	15 April 2002	list
(68851) 2002 HV	16 April 2002	list
(68857) 2002 JF	3 May 2002	list
(68858) 2002 JW	3 May 2002	list
(68859) 2002 JZ	3 May 2002	list
(69111) 2003 CE_{17}	7 February 2003	list
71461 Chowmeeyee	28 January 2000	list
(71468) 2000 BY_{13}	24 January 2000	list
(71887) 2000 WW	17 November 2000	list

(71894) 2000 WS_{9}	20 November 2000	list
(71895) 2000 WM_{11}	23 November 2000	list
(71904) 2000 WB_{27}	26 November 2000	list
(71905) 2000 WF_{27}	26 November 2000	list
(71934) 2000 WA_{63}	26 November 2000	list
72060 Hohhot	23 December 2000	list
(72066) 2000 YX_{21}	29 December 2000	list
(72446) 2001 DM	16 February 2001	list
(72492) 2001 DG_{54}	21 February 2001	list
(72839) 2001 HS_{31}	26 April 2001	list
(72840) 2001 HW_{31}	28 April 2001	list
(72906) 2001 LQ_{1}	13 June 2001	list
(72930) 2002 AE_{10}	11 January 2002	list
(72931) 2002 AJ_{14}	12 January 2002	list
(72944) 2002 CX_{15}	8 February 2002	list
(72951) 2002 CC_{52}	12 February 2002	list
(72953) 2002 CJ_{59}	12 February 2002	list
(72985) 2002 DK_{2}	19 February 2002	list
(72988) 2002 EP	5 March 2002	list
(72990) 2002 EK_{6}	12 March 2002	list
(72995) 2002 ER_{12}	14 March 2002	list
(72996) 2002 EZ_{12}	14 March 2002	list
(73055) 2002 FG	16 March 2002	list
(73056) 2002 FN_{2}	19 March 2002	list
(73057) 2002 FS_{2}	19 March 2002	list

(73058) 2002 FK_{4}	20 March 2002	list
(73080) 2002 GJ_{9}	15 April 2002	list
(73081) 2002 GD_{12}	15 April 2002	list
(73177) 2002 HK_{7}	18 April 2002	list
(73184) 2002 JN	3 May 2002	list
(73185) 2002 JP	3 May 2002	list
(73186) 2002 JQ	3 May 2002	list
(73187) 2002 JS	3 May 2002	list
(73188) 2002 JU	3 May 2002	list
(73189) 2002 JV	3 May 2002	list
(73191) 2002 JY_{1}	4 May 2002	list
(73197) 2002 JL_{12}	5 May 2002	list
(73198) 2002 JQ_{12}	6 May 2002	list
73199 Orlece	8 May 2002	list
(73204) 2002 JZ_{15}	8 May 2002	list
(73245) 2002 JU_{39}	10 May 2002	list
(76869) 2000 YB_{20}	27 December 2000	list
(76979) 2001 BT_{61}	31 January 2001	list
(77051) 2001 DL	16 February 2001	list
77138 Puiching	2 March 2001	list
(77155) 2001 ES_{10}	2 March 2001	list
77318 Danieltsui	27 March 2001	list
(77363) 2001 FO_{130}	31 March 2001	list
(77364) 2001 FQ_{130}	31 March 2001	list
(77451) 2001 HU_{7}	18 April 2001	list

(77462) 2001 HN_{16}	24 April 2001	list
(77470) 2001 HA_{27}	27 April 2001	list
(77484) 2001 HQ_{31}	26 April 2001	list
(77485) 2001 HT_{31}	28 April 2001	list
(77486) 2001 HA_{32}	28 April 2001	list
(77498) 2001 HG_{38}	30 April 2001	list
(77929) 2002 GO_{7}	14 April 2002	list
(77962) 2002 JA_{1}	3 May 2002	list
(77963) 2002 JP_{1}	4 May 2002	list
(77964) 2002 JT_{1}	4 May 2002	list
(77966) 2002 JJ_{5}	5 May 2002	list
(77967) 2002 JK_{5}	5 May 2002	list
(77974) 2002 JD_{13}	8 May 2002	list
(77979) 2002 JU_{21}	9 May 2002	list
(77994) 2002 JY_{39}	10 May 2002	list
(78244) 2002 PU_{1}	2 August 2002	list
(78335) 2002 PP_{86}	13 August 2002	list
(78952) 2003 SG_{214}	26 September 2003	list
(78953) 2003 SC_{217}	27 September 2003	list
(78954) 2003 SK_{218}	28 September 2003	list
(78956) 2003 ST_{223}	27 September 2003	list
(80826) 2000 DH_{1}	26 February 2000	list
(82168) 2001 HW_{3}	17 April 2001	list
(82170) 2001 HR_{7}	17 April 2001	list
(82178) 2001 HB_{14}	18 April 2001	list

(82179) 2001 HE_{16}	22 April 2001	list
(82180) 2001 HJ_{16}	23 April 2001	list
(82182) 2001 HN_{22}	22 April 2001	list
(82183) 2001 HR_{22}	25 April 2001	list
(82184) 2001 HW_{22}	26 April 2001	list
(82192) 2001 HX_{31}	28 April 2001	list
(82203) 2001 HH_{38}	30 April 2001	list
(82900) 2001 QX_{94}	23 August 2001	list
(82901) 2001 QZ_{94}	23 August 2001	list
(82936) 2001 QQ_{113}	25 August 2001	list
(82990) 2001 QK_{152}	25 August 2001	list
(82993) 2001 QO_{154}	28 August 2001	list
(82994) 2001 QP_{154}	30 August 2001	list
(83008) 2001 QY_{163}	31 August 2001	list
(83090) 2001 QG_{232}	24 August 2001	list
(83091) 2001 QJ_{232}	24 August 2001	list
(83141) 2001 QZ_{262}	25 August 2001	list
(83146) 2001 QJ_{265}	26 August 2001	list
(83147) 2001 QP_{265}	26 August 2001	list
(83148) 2001 QQ_{265}	26 August 2001	list
(83200) 2001 RN_{6}	10 September 2001	list
(83201) 2001 RA_{7}	10 September 2001	list
(83203) 2001 RN_{11}	10 September 2001	list
(83209) 2001 RV_{16}	11 September 2001	list
83362 Sandukruit	17 September 2001	list

83363 Yamwingwah	17 September 2001	list
(83364) 2001 SV_{1}	17 September 2001	list
(83365) 2001 SA_{2}	17 September 2001	list
(83366) 2001 SF_{2}	17 September 2001	list
(83367) 2001 SL_{2}	17 September 2001	list
(83368) 2001 SF_{3}	17 September 2001	list
(83369) 2001 SM_{3}	17 September 2001	list
(83494) 2001 SZ_{113}	20 September 2001	list
(83495) 2001 ST_{114}	20 September 2001	list
(83496) 2001 SJ_{115}	20 September 2001	list
83598 Aiweiwei	25 September 2001	list
(83599) 2001 SE_{266}	25 September 2001	list
83600 Yuchunshun	25 September 2001	list
(83601) 2001 SO_{266}	25 September 2001	list
(83602) 2001 SR_{266}	25 September 2001	list
(83662) 2001 TB_{18}	14 October 2001	list
(83675) 2001 TJ_{45}	14 October 2001	list
(83677) 2001 TW_{46}	15 October 2001	list
(83678) 2001 TC_{47}	15 October 2001	list
(83680) 2001 TO_{49}	15 October 2001	list
(83725) 2001 TW_{103}	15 October 2001	list
(83820) 2001 UJ_{4}	17 October 2001	list
(83821) 2001 UL_{5}	18 October 2001	list
(83824) 2001 UL_{15}	25 October 2001	list
(83976) 2002 CA_{15}	9 February 2002	list

(86433) 2000 CU_{2}	4 February 2000	list
(87989) 2000 UG_{1}	21 October 2000	list
(88455) 2001 QN_{94}	23 August 2001	list
(88456) 2001 QT_{94}	23 August 2001	list
(88457) 2001 QV_{94}	23 August 2001	list
(88519) 2001 QS_{163}	31 August 2001	list
(88588) 2001 QP_{263}	25 August 2001	list
(88617) 2001 RT_{6}	10 September 2001	list
(88618) 2001 RH_{7}	10 September 2001	list
(88633) 2001 RP_{43}	10 September 2001	list
(88637) 2001 RJ_{46}	12 September 2001	list
88705 Potato	17 September 2001	list
(88706) 2001 SW	17 September 2001	list
(88707) 2001 SB_{1}	17 September 2001	list
(88708) 2001 SM_{1}	17 September 2001	list
(88709) 2001 SA_{3}	17 September 2001	list
(88711) 2001 SQ_{9}	18 September 2001	list
(88792) 2001 SV_{112}	18 September 2001	list
(88793) 2001 SG_{114}	20 September 2001	list
(88794) 2001 SF_{115}	20 September 2001	list
88874 Wongshingsheuk	25 September 2001	list
88875 Posky	25 September 2001	list
(88876) 2001 SD_{265}	25 September 2001	list
(88877) 2001 SJ_{265}	25 September 2001	list
88878 Bowenyueli	25 September 2001	list

88879 Sungjaoyiu	25 September 2001	list
(88910) 2001 TZ_{7}	11 October 2001	list
(88924) 2001 TZ_{17}	14 October 2001	list
(88925) 2001 TC_{18}	14 October 2001	list
(88960) 2001 TN_{45}	14 October 2001	list
(89122) 2001 UN_{2}	18 October 2001	list
(89123) 2001 US_{2}	18 October 2001	list
(89126) 2001 UV_{3}	17 October 2001	list
(89127) 2001 UX_{3}	17 October 2001	list
89131 Phildevries	23 October 2001	list
(89132) 2001 UU_{13}	24 October 2001	list
(89133) 2001 UV_{13}	24 October 2001	list
(89134) 2001 UW_{15}	25 October 2001	list
(89135) 2001 UB_{16}	25 October 2001	list
(89741) 2002 AV_{9}	11 January 2002	list
(89819) 2002 BN_{1}	19 January 2002	list
(89859) 2002 CS_{117}	12 February 2002	list
(90109) 2002 XR_{39}	9 December 2002	list
(90272) 2003 CM_{16}	7 February 2003	list
(90276) 2003 DE_{2}	22 February 2003	list
(90454) 2004 CV	10 February 2004	list
(92997) 2000 RH_{78}	9 September 2000	list
(93491) 2000 TC_{34}	7 October 2000	list
(93534) 2000 UU_{13}	27 October 2000	list
(93756) 2000 WZ_{8}	19 November 2000	list

(93805) 2000 WT_{50}	26 November 2000	list
(93882) 2000 WA_{130}	19 November 2000	list
(94062) 2000 YF_{21}	29 December 2000	list
(94063) 2000 YA_{22}	29 December 2000	list
(94066) 2000 YT_{29}	29 December 2000	list
94228 Leesuikwan	31 January 2001	list
(94358) 2001 QE_{219}	23 August 2001	list
(94371) 2001 SZ_{9}	18 September 2001	list
(94390) 2001 SW_{112}	18 September 2001	list
(94391) 2001 SE_{113}	18 September 2001	list
(94412) 2001 TM_{18}	14 October 2001	list
(94480) 2001 UN_{4}	17 October 2001	list
(94481) 2001 UO_{4}	17 October 2001	list
(94482) 2001 UV_{6}	18 October 2001	list
(94483) 2001 UP_{10}	21 October 2001	list
(94484) 2001 UR_{10}	21 October 2001	list
(94485) 2001 UU_{11}	23 October 2001	list
(94486) 2001 UV_{11}	23 October 2001	list
(94487) 2001 UA_{14}	24 October 2001	list
(94753) 2001 XE_{88}	14 December 2001	list
(95017) 2002 AX_{9}	11 January 2002	list
(95018) 2002 AZ_{9}	11 January 2002	list
(95021) 2002 AE_{14}	12 January 2002	list
(95022) 2002 AG_{14}	12 January 2002	list
(95034) 2002 AY_{26}	14 January 2002	list

(95035) 2002 AA_{27}	14 January 2002	list
(95036) 2002 AC_{27}	14 January 2002	list
(95037) 2002 AF_{27}	14 January 2002	list
(95214) 2002 CQ_{7}	6 February 2002	list
(95217) 2002 CD_{11}	6 February 2002	list
(95221) 2002 CW_{15}	8 February 2002	list
(95235) 2002 CL_{39}	11 February 2002	list
(95241) 2002 CF_{50}	6 February 2002	list
(95242) 2002 CK_{51}	12 February 2002	list
(95243) 2002 CL_{51}	12 February 2002	list
(95244) 2002 CM_{51}	12 February 2002	list
(95245) 2002 CV_{51}	12 February 2002	list
(95246) 2002 CB_{52}	12 February 2002	list
95247 Schalansky	12 February 2002	list
(95257) 2002 CD_{59}	12 February 2002	list
(95258) 2002 CE_{59}	12 February 2002	list
(95259) 2002 CG_{59}	12 February 2002	list
(95260) 2002 CS_{59}	13 February 2002	list
(95333) 2002 CA_{118}	14 February 2002	list
(95334) 2002 CD_{118}	14 February 2002	list
(95477) 2002 ED_{11}	14 March 2002	list
(95478) 2002 EK_{12}	14 March 2002	list
(95584) 2002 FK_{2}	19 March 2002	list
(95585) 2002 FV_{3}	20 March 2002	list
(95616) 2002 GJ_{7}	14 April 2002	list

(95617) 2002 GP_{7}	14 April 2002	list
(95618) 2002 GW_{7}	14 April 2002	list
(95619) 2002 GZ_{7}	14 April 2002	list
(95620) 2002 GC_{9}	14 April 2002	list
(95678) 2002 HM	16 April 2002	list
(95734) 2003 EJ_{4}	6 March 2003	list
(95864) 2003 GC_{22}	6 April 2003	list
(98395) 2000 UQ_{2}	24 October 2000	list
(98396) 2000 US_{2}	24 October 2000	list
(98411) 2000 UT_{13}	24 October 2000	list
(98495) 2000 VV_{2}	1 November 2000	list
(98531) 2000 VK_{38}	1 November 2000	list
(98728) 2000 YG_{21}	29 December 2000	list
(98734) 2000 YQ_{33}	30 December 2000	list
(99009) 2001 DD_{54}	21 February 2001	list
(99010) 2001 DF_{54}	21 February 2001	list
(99212) 2001 HD_{38}	30 April 2001	list
(99213) 2001 HL_{38}	30 April 2001	list
(99250) 2001 LH	10 June 2001	list
(99303) 2001 SJ_{2}	17 September 2001	list
(99320) 2001 TF_{103}	15 October 2001	list
(99416) 2002 AY_{128}	14 January 2002	list
(99430) 2002 BQ_{1}	19 January 2002	list
(99443) 2002 CA_{14}	8 February 2002	list
(99458) 2002 CF_{59}	12 February 2002	list

(99510) 2002 EO_{12}	14 March 2002	list
(99560) 2002 FD_{2}	19 March 2002	list
(99561) 2002 FJ_{4}	20 March 2002	list
(99584) 2002 GR_{7}	14 April 2002	list
(99585) 2002 GA_{8}	14 April 2002	list
(99586) 2002 GZ_{11}	15 April 2002	list
(99648) 2002 HR	16 April 2002	list
(99667) 2002 JO_{1}	3 May 2002	list
(99668) 2002 JW_{4}	5 May 2002	list
(99669) 2002 JE_{5}	5 May 2002	list
(99673) 2002 JP_{9}	6 May 2002	list
(99675) 2002 JM_{12}	5 May 2002	list
(99676) 2002 JR_{12}	6 May 2002	list
(99708) 2002 JN_{39}	9 May 2002	list
(99709) 2002 JW_{39}	10 May 2002	list
(99710) 2002 JX_{39}	10 May 2002	list
103220 Kwongchuikuen	28 December 1999	list
(103785) 2000 DQ_{8}	27 February 2000	list
(106097) 2000 TC_{2}	4 October 2000	list
(106122) 2000 TE_{34}	7 October 2000	list
(106349) 2000 VE	1 November 2000	list
(106842) 2000 YT_{12}	23 December 2000	list
(106853) 2000 YZ_{19}	27 December 2000	list
(107053) 2001 AZ_{1}	3 January 2001	list
(107154) 2001 BN_{14}	21 January 2001	list

(107155) 2001 BO_{14}	21 January 2001	list
(107278) 2001 BL_{73}	29 January 2001	list
(107600) 2001 EO	2 March 2001	list
(107869) 2001 FM_{86}	27 March 2001	list
(107979) 2001 FR_{130}	31 March 2001	list
(108114) 2001 GP_{1}	15 April 2001	list
(108156) 2001 HM_{4}	17 April 2001	list
(108187) 2001 HF_{16}	23 April 2001	list
(108188) 2001 HH_{16}	23 April 2001	list
(108189) 2001 HK_{16}	23 April 2001	list
(108190) 2001 HL_{16}	23 April 2001	list
(108202) 2001 HO_{22}	25 April 2001	list
(108203) 2001 HT_{22}	26 April 2001	list
(108204) 2001 HX_{22}	26 April 2001	list
(108217) 2001 HN_{31}	26 April 2001	list
(108218) 2001 HR_{31}	26 April 2001	list
(108377) 2001 KG_{20}	23 May 2001	list
(108520) 2001 LK	11 June 2001	list
(108521) 2001 LL	11 June 2001	list
(108565) 2001 MC	16 June 2001	list
(108566) 2001 MF	16 June 2001	list
(108567) 2001 MY	18 June 2001	list
(108671) 2001 OW_{2}	19 July 2001	list
(108785) 2001 OD_{63}	26 July 2001	list
(108786) 2001 OH_{63}	26 July 2001	list

(109188) 2001 QE_{72}	21 August 2001	list
(109216) 2001 QU_{85}	22 August 2001	list
(109217) 2001 QX_{85}	22 August 2001	list
(109224) 2001 QE_{89}	22 August 2001	list
(109235) 2001 QH_{94}	23 August 2001	list
(109236) 2001 QR_{94}	23 August 2001	list
(109348) 2001 QG_{152}	22 August 2001	list
(109349) 2001 QH_{152}	23 August 2001	list
(109350) 2001 QM_{152}	25 August 2001	list
(109378) 2001 QN_{163}	31 August 2001	list
(109379) 2001 QU_{163}	31 August 2001	list
(109474) 2001 QH_{219}	23 August 2001	list
(109501) 2001 QE_{232}	24 August 2001	list
(109502) 2001 QF_{232}	24 August 2001	list
(109650) 2001 RZ_{6}	10 September 2001	list
(109651) 2001 RE_{7}	10 September 2001	list
(109652) 2001 RJ_{7}	10 September 2001	list
(109659) 2001 RF_{11}	10 September 2001	list
(109706) 2001 RU_{43}	10 September 2001	list
(109714) 2001 RL_{48}	11 September 2001	list
(109880) 2001 SZ	17 September 2001	list
(109881) 2001 SE_{1}	17 September 2001	list
(109882) 2001 SM_{2}	17 September 2001	list
(109887) 2001 SW_{9}	18 September 2001	list
(109888) 2001 SY_{9}	18 September 2001	list

(109889) 2001 SB_{10}	20 September 2001	list
(109890) 2001 SF_{10}	20 September 2001	list
110073 Leeonki	20 September 2001	list
110074 Lamchunhei	20 September 2001	list
(110075) 2001 SR_{113}	20 September 2001	list
(110076) 2001 SW_{113}	20 September 2001	list
110077 Pujiquanshan	20 September 2001	list
(110078) 2001 SH_{114}	20 September 2001	list
(110079) 2001 SR_{114}	20 September 2001	list
(110080) 2001 SV_{114}	20 September 2001	list
(110081) 2001 SK_{115}	20 September 2001	list
(110082) 2001 SN_{115}	18 September 2001	list
110288 Libai	23 September 2001	list
110289 Dufu	23 September 2001	list
(110290) 2001 SN_{262}	23 September 2001	list
(110291) 2001 SB_{263}	25 September 2001	list
(110292) 2001 SC_{265}	25 September 2001	list
110293 Oia	25 September 2001	list
110294 Victoriaharbour	25 September 2001	list
110295 Elcalafate	25 September 2001	list
110296 Luxor	25 September 2001	list
110297 Yellowriver	25 September 2001	list
110298 Deceptionisland	25 September 2001	list
(110299) 2001 SW_{266}	25 September 2001	list
110300 Abusimbel	25 September 2001	list

(110391) 2001 TS_{7}	11 October 2001	list
(110392) 2001 TA_{8}	11 October 2001	list
(110415) 2001 TS_{17}	14 October 2001	list
(110459) 2001 TX_{46}	15 October 2001	list
(110460) 2001 TZ_{46}	15 October 2001	list
(110461) 2001 TD_{47}	15 October 2001	list
(110462) 2001 TC_{49}	14 October 2001	list
(110553) 2001 TU_{103}	14 October 2001	list
(110554) 2001 TD_{104}	15 October 2001	list
(110741) 2001 UA_{1}	16 October 2001	list
(110745) 2001 UQ_{5}	21 October 2001	list
(110751) 2001 UH_{12}	24 October 2001	list
(110752) 2001 UT_{12}	24 October 2001	list
(110753) 2001 UW_{12}	24 October 2001	list
(110754) 2001 UB_{13}	24 October 2001	list
(110755) 2001 UT_{13}	24 October 2001	list
(110756) 2001 UN_{15}	25 October 2001	list
(110757) 2001 UA_{16}	25 October 2001	list
(110758) 2001 UF_{17}	23 October 2001	list
(111329) 2001 XW_{87}	14 December 2001	list
(111330) 2001 XX_{87}	14 December 2001	list
(111568) 2002 AS_{9}	11 January 2002	list
(111572) 2002 AQ_{13}	11 January 2002	list
(111626) 2002 AK_{128}	14 January 2002	list
(111695) 2002 CZ_{13}	8 February 2002	list

(111697) 2002 CD_{15}	9 February 2002	list
(111698) 2002 CE_{15}	9 February 2002	list
(111726) 2002 CH_{50}	11 February 2002	list
(111727) 2002 CR_{50}	12 February 2002	list
(111728) 2002 CZ_{51}	12 February 2002	list
(111833) 2002 EN_{12}	14 March 2002	list
(111892) 2002 FU_{2}	19 March 2002	list
(111893) 2002 FW_{2}	19 March 2002	list
(111896) 2002 FL_{4}	20 March 2002	list
(111897) 2002 FP_{4}	20 March 2002	list
(111911) 2002 FE_{36}	21 March 2002	list
(111917) 2002 GL_{9}	15 April 2002	list
(111919) 2002 GH_{11}	14 April 2002	list
(111920) 2002 GX_{11}	15 April 2002	list
(112030) 2002 HF_{7}	18 April 2002	list
(112031) 2002 HH_{7}	18 April 2002	list
(112041) 2002 JG	3 May 2002	list
(112042) 2002 JR_{1}	4 May 2002	list
(112043) 2002 JB_{2}	4 May 2002	list
(112053) 2002 JE_{13}	8 May 2002	list
(112054) 2002 JF_{13}	8 May 2002	list
(112055) 2002 JH_{13}	8 May 2002	list
(112056) 2002 JK_{13}	8 May 2002	list
(112073) 2002 JP_{21}	9 May 2002	list
(112110) 2002 JP_{39}	10 May 2002	list

(112275) 2002 LG_{24}	9 June 2002	list
(112657) 2002 PO_{86}	13 August 2002	list
(114620) 2003 EL_{4}	6 March 2003	list
(115082) 2003 SP_{6}	17 September 2003	list
(115152) 2003 SA_{68}	17 September 2003	list
(115311) 2003 SH_{214}	26 September 2003	list
(115317) 2003 SZ_{216}	27 September 2003	list
(115318) 2003 SJ_{217}	27 September 2003	list
(115319) 2003 SR_{218}	28 September 2003	list
(115323) 2003 SO_{219}	27 September 2003	list
(115324) 2003 SP_{220}	29 September 2003	list
(115325) 2003 SQ_{220}	29 September 2003	list
(115327) 2003 SH_{222}	27 September 2003	list
(115329) 2003 SY_{222}	27 September 2003	list
(116659) 2004 CW_{36}	12 February 2004	list
(116660) 2004 CV_{37}	13 February 2004	list
(116662) 2004 CW_{39}	12 February 2004	list
(116716) 2004 DM_{7}	17 February 2004	list
(116719) 2004 DN_{10}	18 February 2004	list
(116741) 2004 DR_{45}	26 February 2004	list
(116775) 2004 EW_{21}	15 March 2004	list
(116954) 2004 HS_{1}	20 April 2004	list
(117241) 2004 SS_{20}	17 September 2004	list
(117243) 2004 SU_{25}	22 September 2004	list
(118933) 2000 WA_{27}	26 November 2000	list

(119193) 2001 QH_{108}	23 August 2001	list
(119261) 2001 RG_{48}	11 September 2001	list
(119292) 2001 SR_{1}	17 September 2001	list
(119293) 2001 SB_{2}	17 September 2001	list
(119295) 2001 SV_{9}	18 September 2001	list
(119296) 2001 SD_{10}	20 September 2001	list
(119321) 2001 SX_{114}	20 September 2001	list
(119385) 2001 TU_{7}	11 October 2001	list
(119398) 2001 TV_{46}	15 October 2001	list
(119399) 2001 TH_{49}	15 October 2001	list
(119424) 2001 TG_{104}	15 October 2001	list
(119466) 2001 UK_{5}	18 October 2001	list
(119467) 2001 UB_{7}	18 October 2001	list
(119469) 2001 UE_{11}	22 October 2001	list
(119470) 2001 UN_{13}	24 October 2001	list
(119471) 2001 UZ_{13}	24 October 2001	list
(119823) 2002 BB_{2}	22 January 2002	list
(119838) 2002 CA_{16}	9 February 2002	list
(119843) 2002 CO_{39}	11 February 2002	list
(119907) 2002 EJ_{12}	14 March 2002	list
(119945) 2002 JH_{12}	4 May 2002	list
(120078) 2003 EH_{4}	6 March 2003	list
(120221) 2004 FJ_{18}	28 March 2004	list
(120259) 2004 GB_{20}	15 April 2004	list
(124084) 2001 HP_{7}	17 April 2001	list

(124091) 2001 HD_{27}	27 April 2001	list
(124323) 2001 QO_{94}	23 August 2001	list
(124335) 2001 QL_{108}	24 August 2001	list
(124371) 2001 QJ_{152}	25 August 2001	list
(124372) 2001 QN_{152}	26 August 2001	list
(124373) 2001 QP_{152}	26 August 2001	list
(124374) 2001 QU_{152}	26 August 2001	list
(124375) 2001 QV_{152}	26 August 2001	list
(124474) 2001 RQ_{6}	10 September 2001	list
(124475) 2001 RX_{6}	10 September 2001	list
(124476) 2001 RB_{7}	10 September 2001	list
(124477) 2001 RD_{7}	10 September 2001	list
(124493) 2001 RT_{43}	10 September 2001	list
(124499) 2001 RK_{46}	12 September 2001	list
(124563) 2001 SO_{1}	17 September 2001	list
(124564) 2001 SS_{1}	17 September 2001	list
(124565) 2001 SD_{2}	17 September 2001	list
(124566) 2001 SN_{2}	17 September 2001	list
(124567) 2001 SO_{2}	17 September 2001	list
(124568) 2001 SV_{2}	17 September 2001	list
(124573) 2001 SS_{9}	18 September 2001	list
(124574) 2001 ST_{9}	18 September 2001	list
(124681) 2001 ST_{112}	18 September 2001	list
(124682) 2001 SC_{113}	18 September 2001	list
(124683) 2001 SL_{113}	20 September 2001	list

(124684) 2001 SW_{114}	20 September 2001	list
(124685) 2001 SN_{116}	18 September 2001	list
(124793) 2001 SY_{265}	25 September 2001	list
(124794) 2001 SC_{266}	25 September 2001	list
(124795) 2001 SN_{266}	25 September 2001	list
(124796) 2001 SC_{267}	25 September 2001	list
(124797) 2001 SX_{267}	25 September 2001	list
(124798) 2001 SZ_{267}	25 September 2001	list
(124850) 2001 TW_{17}	14 October 2001	list
(124851) 2001 TH_{18}	14 October 2001	list
(124887) 2001 TH_{45}	14 October 2001	list
(124888) 2001 TP_{45}	14 October 2001	list
(124889) 2001 TT_{46}	14 October 2001	list
(124890) 2001 TU_{46}	15 October 2001	list
(124893) 2001 TM_{49}	15 October 2001	list
(124894) 2001 TN_{49}	15 October 2001	list
(124964) 2001 TV_{103}	15 October 2001	list
(124965) 2001 TF_{104}	15 October 2001	list
(125056) 2001 TF_{228}	15 October 2001	list
(125075) 2001 UU_{5}	21 October 2001	list
(125082) 2001 UZ_{10}	22 October 2001	list
(125083) 2001 UM_{12}	24 October 2001	list
(125084) 2001 US_{12}	24 October 2001	list
(125085) 2001 UG_{13}	24 October 2001	list
(125086) 2001 UJ_{15}	24 October 2001	list

(125087) 2001 UD_{16}	25 October 2001	list
(126174) 2002 AA_{10}	11 January 2002	list
(126178) 2002 AW_{13}	12 January 2002	list
(126179) 2002 AY_{13}	12 January 2002	list
(126180) 2002 AC_{14}	12 January 2002	list
(126386) 2002 BT	21 January 2002	list
(126388) 2002 BS_{1}	20 January 2002	list
(126389) 2002 BX_{1}	21 January 2002	list
(126390) 2002 BZ_{1}	21 January 2002	list
(126433) 2002 CT_{7}	6 February 2002	list
(126436) 2002 CC_{11}	6 February 2002	list
(126437) 2002 CG_{11}	6 February 2002	list
(126440) 2002 CP_{13}	8 February 2002	list
(126441) 2002 CV_{14}	8 February 2002	list
(126442) 2002 CJ_{15}	9 February 2002	list
(126443) 2002 CV_{15}	8 February 2002	list
(126474) 2002 CM_{43}	11 February 2002	list
(126482) 2002 CB_{51}	12 February 2002	list
(126483) 2002 CC_{51}	12 February 2002	list
(126484) 2002 CU_{51}	12 February 2002	list
(126496) 2002 CM_{59}	12 February 2002	list
(126497) 2002 CQ_{59}	13 February 2002	list
(126782) 2002 ED_{12}	14 March 2002	list
(126940) 2002 FJ	16 March 2002	list
(126941) 2002 FL	16 March 2002	list

(126942) 2002 FP	18 March 2002	list
(126943) 2002 FX	18 March 2002	list
(126945) 2002 FE_{2}	19 March 2002	list
(126946) 2002 FF_{2}	19 March 2002	list
(126947) 2002 FP_{3}	18 March 2002	list
(126948) 2002 FX_{3}	20 March 2002	list
(127007) 2002 GC_{7}	12 April 2002	list
(127009) 2002 GK_{11}	14 April 2002	list
(127010) 2002 GO_{11}	14 April 2002	list
(127011) 2002 GT_{11}	14 April 2002	list
(127012) 2002 GU_{11}	15 April 2002	list
(127013) 2002 GV_{11}	15 April 2002	list
(127014) 2002 GY_{11}	15 April 2002	list
(127197) 2002 HO	16 April 2002	list
(127204) 2002 HJ_{7}	18 April 2002	list
(127218) 2002 JE	3 May 2002	list
(127252) 2002 JM_{39}	9 May 2002	list
(127253) 2002 JQ_{39}	10 May 2002	list
(127651) 2003 DP_{2}	22 February 2003	list
(127673) 2003 EK_{4}	6 March 2003	list
(127901) 2003 GD_{22}	6 April 2003	list
(127902) 2003 GG_{22}	6 April 2003	list
(128189) 2003 SR_{6}	17 September 2003	list
(128813) 2004 RH_{288}	15 September 2004	list
(128814) 2004 RJ_{288}	15 September 2004	list

(128815) 2004 RK_{288}	15 September 2004	list
(128858) 2004 SQ_{20}	17 September 2004	list
(130574) 2000 RF_{60}	8 September 2000	list
(130604) 2000 SH_{10}	23 September 2000	list
(130874) 2000 VK_{3}	1 November 2000	list
(130915) 2000 WO_{2}	18 November 2000	list
(131005) 2000 XF_{2}	3 December 2000	list
(131042) 2000 YF_{16}	23 December 2000	list
(131330) 2001 HW_{26}	27 April 2001	list
(131331) 2001 HC_{27}	27 April 2001	list
(131333) 2001 HZ_{31}	28 April 2001	list
(131410) 2001 MN_{8}	24 June 2001	list
(131499) 2001 SU_{266}	25 September 2001	list
(131646) 2001 XH_{88}	14 December 2001	list
(131760) 2002 AW_{9}	11 January 2002	list
(131761) 2002 AB_{10}	11 January 2002	list
(131768) 2002 AB_{14}	12 January 2002	list
(131782) 2002 AZ_{26}	14 January 2002	list
(131783) 2002 AE_{27}	14 January 2002	list
(131899) 2002 BC_{1}	19 January 2002	list
(131900) 2002 BG_{1}	19 January 2002	list
(131901) 2002 BY_{1}	21 January 2002	list
(131902) 2002 BA_{2}	21 January 2002	list
(131932) 2002 CB_{11}	6 February 2002	list
(131935) 2002 CW_{13}	8 February 2002	list

(131937) 2002 CB_{15}	9 February 2002	list
(131938) 2002 CC_{15}	9 February 2002	list
(131939) 2002 CH_{15}	9 February 2002	list
(131957) 2002 CG_{39}	11 February 2002	list
(131965) 2002 CU_{50}	12 February 2002	list
(131966) 2002 CP_{51}	12 February 2002	list
(132029) 2002 CB_{118}	14 February 2002	list
(132301) 2002 GG_{7}	14 April 2002	list
(132302) 2002 GK_{7}	14 April 2002	list
(132304) 2002 GH_{9}	15 April 2002	list
(132305) 2002 GG_{11}	14 April 2002	list
(132306) 2002 GQ_{11}	14 April 2002	list
(132307) 2002 GH_{12}	15 April 2002	list
(132460) 2002 HG_{7}	18 April 2002	list
(132464) 2002 JM	3 May 2002	list
(132465) 2002 JO	3 May 2002	list
(132466) 2002 JY	3 May 2002	list
(132467) 2002 JW_{1}	4 May 2002	list
(132469) 2002 JY_{4}	5 May 2002	list
(132473) 2002 JN_{12}	5 May 2002	list
(132474) 2002 JU_{12}	8 May 2002	list
(132630) 2002 LH_{24}	9 June 2002	list
(132679) 2002 NF_{16}	6 July 2002	list
(133297) 2003 SW_{36}	19 September 2003	list
(133357) 2003 SS_{127}	20 September 2003	list

(133421) 2003 SK_{190}	22 September 2003	list
(133422) 2003 SL_{190}	22 September 2003	list
(133444) 2003 SF_{217}	27 September 2003	list
(133445) 2003 SK_{220}	28 September 2003	list
(133446) 2003 SM_{220}	29 September 2003	list
(133447) 2003 SN_{220}	29 September 2003	list
(133448) 2003 SL_{222}	27 September 2003	list
(133449) 2003 SE_{223}	28 September 2003	list
(133450) 2003 SG_{223}	29 September 2003	list
(133451) 2003 SV_{223}	29 September 2003	list
(133454) 2003 SN_{226}	26 September 2003	list
(134159) 2005 BP	16 January 2005	list
(134272) 2006 BW_{145}	28 January 2006	list
(135030) 2001 ME_{10}	24 June 2001	list
(135310) 2001 SS_{264}	17 September 2001	list
(135311) 2001 SQ_{265}	25 September 2001	list
(135312) 2001 SS_{266}	25 September 2001	list
(135410) 2001 UX_{5}	21 October 2001	list
(135411) 2001 UE_{16}	25 October 2001	list
(135525) 2002 AO_{13}	11 January 2002	list
(135533) 2002 CF_{52}	12 February 2002	list
(135599) 2002 HU	16 April 2002	list
(135607) 2002 JQ_{21}	9 May 2002	list
(135616) 2002 JJ_{39}	9 May 2002	list
(136140) 2003 SS_{220}	29 September 2003	list

(138678) 2000 SS_{23}	26 September 2000	list
(138838) 2000 VL_{3}	1 November 2000	list
(138950) 2001 BR_{61}	31 January 2001	list
(139143) 2001 FM_{91}	27 March 2001	list
(139222) 2001 HL_{4}	17 April 2001	list
(139238) 2001 HP_{22}	25 April 2001	list
(139364) 2001 MO_{8}	24 June 2001	list
(139445) 2001 OE_{63}	26 July 2001	list
(139561) 2001 QF_{72}	21 August 2001	list
(139578) 2001 QP_{94}	23 August 2001	list
(139629) 2001 QO_{152}	26 August 2001	list
(139685) 2001 QN_{210}	23 August 2001	list
(139791) 2001 RR_{6}	10 September 2001	list
(139799) 2001 RL_{11}	10 September 2001	list
(139805) 2001 RT_{16}	11 September 2001	list
(139806) 2001 RB_{17}	11 September 2001	list
(139807) 2001 RJ_{17}	11 September 2001	list
(139842) 2001 RV_{43}	10 September 2001	list
(139844) 2001 RF_{48}	11 September 2001	list
(140071) 2001 SX_{113}	20 September 2001	list
(140072) 2001 SP_{114}	20 September 2001	list
(140073) 2001 SC_{115}	20 September 2001	list
(140263) 2001 SO_{265}	25 September 2001	list
(140264) 2001 SR_{267}	25 September 2001	list
(140340) 2001 TO_{7}	11 October 2001	list

(140341) 2001 TR_{7}	11 October 2001	list
(140351) 2001 TD_{18}	14 October 2001	list
(140352) 2001 TK_{18}	14 October 2001	list
(140383) 2001 TP_{48}	14 October 2001	list
(140435) 2001 TX_{103}	15 October 2001	list
(140607) 2001 UC_{4}	17 October 2001	list
(140608) 2001 UD_{4}	17 October 2001	list
(140609) 2001 UE_{4}	17 October 2001	list
(140611) 2001 UQ_{6}	17 October 2001	list
(140612) 2001 UU_{6}	18 October 2001	list
(140613) 2001 UX_{6}	18 October 2001	list
(140614) 2001 UZ_{6}	18 October 2001	list
(140615) 2001 UA_{7}	18 October 2001	list
(140616) 2001 UC_{7}	22 October 2001	list
140620 Raoulwallenberg	21 October 2001	list
(140621) 2001 UQ_{10}	21 October 2001	list
(140622) 2001 UO_{12}	24 October 2001	list
(140623) 2001 UR_{12}	24 October 2001	list
(140624) 2001 UY_{12}	24 October 2001	list
(140625) 2001 UZ_{12}	24 October 2001	list
(140626) 2001 UC_{13}	24 October 2001	list
(140627) 2001 UR_{13}	24 October 2001	list
(140629) 2001 UU_{14}	24 October 2001	list
(140630) 2001 UY_{14}	24 October 2001	list
(140631) 2001 UV_{15}	25 October 2001	list

(140853) 2001 UU_{215}	23 October 2001	list
(141342) 2002 AN_{9}	11 January 2002	list
(141352) 2002 AD_{27}	14 January 2002	list
(141395) 2002 AX_{128}	14 January 2002	list
(141428) 2002 CR_{7}	6 February 2002	list
(141536) 2002 GM_{7}	14 April 2002	list
(141586) 2002 HQ	16 April 2002	list
(141598) 2002 JJ	3 May 2002	list
(141599) 2002 JL	3 May 2002	list
(141600) 2002 JA_{2}	4 May 2002	list
(141603) 2002 JX_{4}	5 May 2002	list
(141604) 2002 JB_{5}	5 May 2002	list
(141610) 2002 JK_{12}	4 May 2002	list
(141611) 2002 JP_{12}	6 May 2002	list
(141612) 2002 JA_{13}	8 May 2002	list
(141731) 2002 LF_{24}	9 June 2002	list
(141927) 2002 PY_{86}	13 August 2002	list
(143094) 2002 XA_{15}	7 December 2002	list
(143095) 2002 XB_{15}	7 December 2002	list
(143510) 2003 EN_{4}	6 March 2003	list
(143675) 2003 SJ_{214}	26 September 2003	list
(143676) 2003 SK_{214}	26 September 2003	list
(143677) 2003 SW_{220}	29 September 2003	list
(144201) 2004 CO_{1}	11 February 2004	list
(144202) 2004 CR_{1}	11 February 2004	list

(144225) 2004 CL_{37}	12 February 2004	list
144296 Steviewonder	16 February 2004	list
(144377) 2004 DW_{59}	26 February 2004	list
(144530) 2004 EG_{82}	15 March 2004	list
(144812) 2004 JX	10 May 2004	list
(144814) 2004 JL_{2}	12 May 2004	list
(144890) 2004 RG_{288}	15 September 2004	list
(146489) 2001 SW_{2}	17 September 2001	list
(146542) 2001 SD_{266}	25 September 2001	list
(146585) 2001 TY_{103}	15 October 2001	list
(146621) 2001 TX_{229}	15 October 2001	list
(146627) 2001 UD_{12}	23 October 2001	list
(146628) 2001 UJ_{12}	24 October 2001	list
(146939) 2002 DR_{17}	19 February 2002	list
(146963) 2002 JD_{12}	3 May 2002	list
(146968) 2002 LD_{24}	9 June 2002	list
(147220) 2002 XZ_{14}	7 December 2002	list
(147228) 2002 XL_{35}	8 December 2002	list
(147520) 2004 DJ_{40}	18 February 2004	list
(147525) 2004 DQ_{45}	26 February 2004	list
(147893) 2006 SH	16 September 2006	list
(147930) 2006 WD_{28}	22 November 2006	list
(148413) 2000 WY_{62}	26 November 2000	list
(148554) 2001 QR_{163}	31 August 2001	list
(148586) 2001 RP_{5}	9 September 2001	list

(148587) 2001 RM_{6}	10 September 2001	list
(148589) 2001 RQ_{11}	10 September 2001	list
(148592) 2001 RM_{17}	11 September 2001	list
(148631) 2001 SP_{3}	17 September 2001	list
(148735) 2001 TN_{104}	15 October 2001	list
(148774) 2001 UK_{4}	17 October 2001	list
(148775) 2001 UM_{4}	17 October 2001	list
(148777) 2001 UK_{10}	16 October 2001	list
(148778) 2001 UL_{13}	24 October 2001	list
(149028) 2002 AU_{128}	14 January 2002	list
(149051) 2002 CU_{7}	6 February 2002	list
(149060) 2002 CA_{51}	12 February 2002	list
(149062) 2002 CK_{59}	12 February 2002	list
(149063) 2002 CL_{59}	12 February 2002	list
(149122) 2002 EM_{12}	14 March 2002	list
(149153) 2002 FK	16 March 2002	list
(149590) 2004 CO_{36}	12 February 2004	list
(149591) 2004 CL_{51}	13 February 2004	list
(149619) 2004 EY_{21}	15 March 2004	list
(150611) 2000 YR_{12}	23 December 2000	list
(150742) 2001 QY_{85}	22 August 2001	list
(150765) 2001 QE_{210}	23 August 2001	list
(150769) 2001 QX_{227}	24 August 2001	list
(150823) 2001 SZ_{2}	17 September 2001	list
(150824) 2001 SL_{3}	17 September 2001	list

(150856) 2001 SS_{112}	18 September 2001	list
(150890) 2001 SN_{267}	25 September 2001	list
(150903) 2001 SN_{341}	21 September 2001	list
(150989) 2001 UL_{4}	17 October 2001	list
(150992) 2001 UD_{13}	24 October 2001	list
(150993) 2001 UK_{15}	25 October 2001	list
(151290) 2002 CO_{7}	6 February 2002	list
(151297) 2002 CE_{52}	12 February 2002	list
(151316) 2002 CE_{118}	14 February 2002	list
(151422) 2002 FH	16 March 2002	list
(151425) 2002 FT_{2}	19 March 2002	list
(151426) 2002 FV_{2}	19 March 2002	list
(151437) 2002 GB_{7}	12 April 2002	list
(151438) 2002 GL_{7}	14 April 2002	list
(151478) 2002 JR	3 May 2002	list
(151975) 2004 HU_{1}	20 April 2004	list
151997 Bauhinia	11 May 2004	list
(153237) 2001 AY_{1}	3 January 2001	list
(153303) 2001 HC_{14}	23 April 2001	list
(153394) 2001 QQ_{100}	23 August 2001	list
(153437) 2001 QD_{230}	24 August 2001	list
(153464) 2001 RW_{6}	10 September 2001	list
(153465) 2001 RF_{7}	10 September 2001	list
(153466) 2001 RC_{11}	10 September 2001	list
(153512) 2001 SB_{3}	17 September 2001	list

(153544) 2001 SR_{112}	18 September 2001	list
(153545) 2001 SS_{114}	20 September 2001	list
(153546) 2001 SZ_{114}	20 September 2001	list
(153592) 2001 SG_{266}	25 September 2001	list
(153617) 2001 TR_{17}	14 October 2001	list
(153653) 2001 TA_{104}	15 October 2001	list
(153689) 2001 UY_{10}	22 October 2001	list
(153690) 2001 UH_{15}	24 October 2001	list
(153691) 2001 UY_{15}	25 October 2001	list
(153954) 2002 AL_{9}	11 January 2002	list
(154047) 2002 CG_{116}	13 February 2002	list
(154142) 2002 FW	18 March 2002	list
(154143) 2002 FJ_{2}	19 March 2002	list
(154155) 2002 GS_{11}	14 April 2002	list
(154203) 2002 HD_{7}	18 April 2002	list
(154207) 2002 JH_{5}	5 May 2002	list
(154208) 2002 JS_{21}	9 May 2002	list
(154213) 2002 JO_{39}	10 May 2002	list
(154214) 2002 JV_{39}	10 May 2002	list
(154358) 2002 XM_{47}	9 December 2002	list
(154688) 2004 HV_{1}	20 April 2004	list
(155836) 2000 YC_{22}	29 December 2000	list
(155865) 2001 DK	16 February 2001	list
(155951) 2001 QD_{89}	22 August 2001	list
(155995) 2001 RX_{5}	9 September 2001	list

(155996) 2001 RD_{11}	10 September 2001	list
(156038) 2001 SK_{1}	17 September 2001	list
(156041) 2001 SM_{10}	18 September 2001	list
(156072) 2001 SF_{113}	18 September 2001	list
(156113) 2001 SY_{266}	25 September 2001	list
(156114) 2001 ST_{267}	25 September 2001	list
(156127) 2001 TR_{1}	11 October 2001	list
(156159) 2001 TK_{104}	15 October 2001	list
(156192) 2001 UJ_{5}	17 October 2001	list
(156194) 2001 UM_{6}	17 October 2001	list
(156195) 2001 UW_{6}	18 October 2001	list
(156196) 2001 UZ_{11}	23 October 2001	list
(156477) 2002 CO_{52}	12 February 2002	list
(156636) 2002 JX_{21}	9 May 2002	list
(156853) 2003 CD_{17}	7 February 2003	list
(156883) 2003 EG_{4}	6 March 2003	list
(157061) 2003 SP_{201}	26 September 2003	list
(157086) 2004 EQ_{10}	15 March 2004	list
(157134) 2004 OR	17 July 2004	list
(157286) 2004 RS_{287}	15 September 2004	list
(158197) 2001 SQ_{1}	17 September 2001	list
(158198) 2001 SC_{10}	20 September 2001	list
(158216) 2001 SV_{113}	20 September 2001	list
(158232) 2001 SO_{267}	25 September 2001	list
(158273) 2001 UP_{2}	18 October 2001	list

(158274) 2001 UM_{5}	18 October 2001	list
(158276) 2001 UA_{12}	23 October 2001	list
(158277) 2001 UC_{15}	24 October 2001	list
(158278) 2001 UF_{16}	25 October 2001	list
(158521) 2002 FC_{4}	20 March 2002	list
(158553) 2002 JS_{1}	4 May 2002	list
(158647) 2003 DL_{2}	22 February 2003	list
(159309) 2006 BO_{100}	28 January 2006	list
(159543) 2001 RW_{63}	11 September 2001	list
(159621) 2002 AN_{128}	14 January 2002	list
(160146) 2001 HU_{22}	26 April 2001	list
(160207) 2002 CE_{39}	10 February 2002	list
(160906) 2001 UB_{12}	23 October 2001	list
(160918) 2001 XB_{88}	14 December 2001	list
(160941) 2002 AM_{9}	11 January 2002	list
(160971) 2002 CM_{13}	8 February 2002	list
(160977) 2002 CH_{59}	12 February 2002	list
(161023) 2002 FL_{2}	19 March 2002	list
(161028) 2002 GS_{7}	14 April 2002	list
(161049) 2002 JV_{12}	8 May 2002	list
(161514) 2004 RE_{288}	15 September 2004	list
(161814) 2006 WS_{27}	22 November 2006	list
(162724) 2000 VW_{2}	1 November 2000	list
(162787) 2000 YB_{22}	29 December 2000	list
(162899) 2001 HB_{27}	27 April 2001	list

(163005) 2001 SX_{265}	25 September 2001	list
(163010) 2001 TM_{45}	14 October 2001	list
(163074) 2002 AD_{14}	12 January 2002	list
(163120) 2002 BW_{1}	21 January 2002	list
(163133) 2002 CV_{13}	8 February 2002	list
(163139) 2002 CQ_{39}	11 February 2002	list
(163141) 2002 CS_{50}	12 February 2002	list
(163142) 2002 CD_{51}	12 February 2002	list
(163185) 2002 DJ_{2}	19 February 2002	list
(163193) 2002 EQ_{12}	14 March 2002	list
(163893) 2003 SX_{201}	26 September 2003	list
(163900) 2003 SD_{222}	26 September 2003	list
(163901) 2003 SG_{222}	27 September 2003	list
(163903) 2003 SK_{223}	29 September 2003	list
(163910) 2003 SF_{238}	27 September 2003	list
(164265) 2004 VO	2 November 2004	list
(164333) 2005 BF	16 January 2005	list
(165784) 2001 RN_{5}	9 September 2001	list
(165785) 2001 RT_{5}	9 September 2001	list
(165786) 2001 RW_{5}	9 September 2001	list
(165799) 2001 RJ_{48}	11 September 2001	list
(166004) 2002 AA_{67}	14 January 2002	list
(166040) 2002 CE_{11}	6 February 2002	list
(166043) 2002 CN_{13}	8 February 2002	list
(166053) 2002 CH_{39}	11 February 2002	list

(166057) 2002 CO_{51}	12 February 2002	list
(166058) 2002 CK_{52}	12 February 2002	list
(166085) 2002 CU_{117}	12 February 2002	list
(166086) 2002 CX_{117}	12 February 2002	list
(166146) 2002 EP_{12}	14 March 2002	list
(166222) 2002 FY_{3}	20 March 2002	list
(166241) 2002 GF_{12}	15 April 2002	list
(166297) 2002 JC_{5}	5 May 2002	list
(166300) 2002 JG_{12}	4 May 2002	list
(166301) 2002 JJ_{13}	8 May 2002	list
(166303) 2002 JX_{15}	5 May 2002	list
(167153) 2003 SA_{218}	27 September 2003	list
(167154) 2003 SC_{218}	27 September 2003	list
(167155) 2003 SU_{218}	28 September 2003	list
(167610) 2004 CS_{1}	11 February 2004	list
(167642) 2004 DK_{10}	18 February 2004	list
(167683) 2004 HK_{20}	22 April 2004	list
(167978) 2005 GE_{10}	4 April 2005	list
(168877) 2000 WC_{27}	26 November 2000	list
(168914) 2000 YU_{21}	27 December 2000	list
(168945) 2000 YN_{131}	30 December 2000	list
(169251) 2001 SG_{113}	20 September 2001	list
(169287) 2001 ST_{264}	25 September 2001	list
(169305) 2001 TJ_{49}	15 October 2001	list
(169350) 2001 US_{5}	21 October 2001	list

(169353) 2001 UL_{17}	24 October 2001	list
(169455) 2002 CB_{14}	8 February 2002	list
(169462) 2002 CN_{59}	12 February 2002	list
(169515) 2002 EN	5 March 2002	list
(169516) 2002 EQ	5 March 2002	list
(169518) 2002 EH_{12}	14 March 2002	list
(169566) 2002 FG_{4}	20 March 2002	list
(169567) 2002 FO_{4}	20 March 2002	list
(169575) 2002 GQ_{7}	14 April 2002	list
(169576) 2002 GB_{8}	14 April 2002	list
(169634) 2002 JW_{12}	8 May 2002	list
(170089) 2002 XR_{35}	7 December 2002	list
(170309) 2003 SS_{36}	18 September 2003	list
(170375) 2003 SU_{253}	27 September 2003	list
(170384) 2003 SY_{288}	28 September 2003	list
(170752) 2004 CX_{1}	11 February 2004	list
(170792) 2004 DL_{10}	18 February 2004	list
(171752) 2000 YZ_{21}	29 December 2000	list
(171765) 2000 YO_{131}	30 December 2000	list
(171851) 2001 MG	16 June 2001	list
(171919) 2001 SG_{115}	20 September 2001	list
(171945) 2001 SP_{270}	25 September 2001	list
(172104) 2002 GA_{12}	15 April 2002	list
(172360) 2002 XM_{39}	9 December 2002	list
(172463) 2003 SO_{6}	17 September 2003	list

(172509) 2003 SS_{218}	28 September 2003	list
(172523) 2003 SO_{291}	30 September 2003	list
(172524) 2003 SK_{310}	28 September 2003	list
(172754) 2004 DM	16 February 2004	list
(172816) 2004 HX_{1}	20 April 2004	list
(173105) 2007 VU_{5}	4 November 2007	list
(173527) 2000 VO_{60}	1 November 2000	list
(173658) 2001 HX_{26}	27 April 2001	list
(173659) 2001 HC_{38}	27 April 2001	list
(173707) 2001 QL_{94}	23 August 2001	list
(173708) 2001 QS_{94}	23 August 2001	list
(173790) 2001 SO_{113}	20 September 2001	list
(173827) 2001 TT_{17}	14 October 2001	list
(173874) 2001 UO_{10}	21 October 2001	list
(173876) 2001 UW_{14}	24 October 2001	list
(174096) 2002 JJ_{12}	4 May 2002	list
(174439) 2002 XF_{39}	7 December 2002	list
(174440) 2002 XQ_{39}	9 December 2002	list
(174442) 2002 XE_{43}	9 December 2002	list
(174611) 2003 SV_{36}	19 September 2003	list
(174662) 2003 SZ_{213}	26 September 2003	list
(174663) 2003 SY_{216}	27 September 2003	list
(174664) 2003 SR_{220}	29 September 2003	list
(174914) 2004 CP_{1}	11 February 2004	list
(174915) 2004 CQ_{1}	11 February 2004	list

(176159) 2001 HP_{31}	26 April 2001	list
(176256) 2001 RV_{5}	9 September 2001	list
(176361) 2001 TM_{104}	15 October 2001	list
(176535) 2002 AA_{14}	12 January 2002	list
(176624) 2002 JR_{39}	10 May 2002	list
(176639) 2002 NG_{1}	4 July 2002	list
(177413) 2004 CF_{2}	12 February 2004	list
(177478) 2004 EC_{11}	15 March 2004	list
(178938) 2001 QA_{89}	22 August 2001	list
(178970) 2001 QH_{232}	24 August 2001	list
(178980) 2001 QJ_{263}	25 August 2001	list
(178994) 2001 RV_{2}	9 September 2001	list
(179042) 2001 SA_{10}	18 September 2001	list
(179124) 2001 SU_{265}	25 September 2001	list
(179226) 2001 UX_{10}	22 October 2001	list
(179228) 2001 UX_{14}	24 October 2001	list
(179464) 2002 BM_{1}	19 January 2002	list
(179481) 2002 CT_{13}	8 February 2002	list
(179504) 2002 CL_{118}	14 February 2002	list
(180079) 2003 DU_{2}	22 February 2003	list
(180152) 2003 GK_{22}	6 April 2003	list
(180199) 2003 SK_{217}	27 September 2003	list
(180368) 2003 YB_{111}	27 December 2003	list
(180457) 2004 CQ_{2}	12 February 2004	list
(180469) 2004 CV_{36}	12 February 2004	list

(180473) 2004 CG_{51}	13 February 2004	list
(180541) 2004 ES_{10}	15 March 2004	list
(180578) 2004 FL_{18}	28 March 2004	list
(180590) 2004 FN_{44}	16 March 2004	list
(180684) 2004 HW_{1}	20 April 2004	list
(181547) 2006 UT_{217}	31 October 2006	list
(182407) 2001 RD_{48}	10 September 2001	list
(182436) 2001 SJ_{1}	17 September 2001	list
(182475) 2001 SL_{115}	20 September 2001	list
(182512) 2001 SL_{268}	25 September 2001	list
(182838) 2002 CG_{15}	9 February 2002	list
(182898) 2002 EF_{12}	14 March 2002	list
(182993) 2002 PC_{1}	4 August 2002	list
(183854) 2004 CG_{2}	12 February 2004	list
(183906) 2004 CP_{91}	13 February 2004	list
(183972) 2004 EA_{11}	15 March 2004	list
(184127) 2004 JJ_{1}	11 May 2004	list
(184181) 2004 OO	17 July 2004	list
(185383) 2006 WE_{2}	18 November 2006	list
(185405) 2006 WQ_{128}	26 November 2006	list
(185406) 2006 WJ_{129}	26 November 2006	list
(185445) 2006 YA_{2}	17 December 2006	list
(186043) 2001 SA_{1}	17 September 2001	list
(186044) 2001 SZ_{1}	17 September 2001	list
(186145) 2001 US_{10}	21 October 2001	list

(186351) 2002 FB_{4}	20 March 2002	list
(186766) 2004 DG	16 February 2004	list
(188007) 2001 TN_{7}	11 October 2001	list
(188081) 2001 XY_{87}	14 December 2001	list
(188390) 2004 DP_{11}	17 February 2004	list
(188402) 2004 EQ_{22}	15 March 2004	list
(188415) 2004 FF	16 March 2004	list
(189138) 2002 CL_{50}	12 February 2002	list
(189144) 2002 GF_{7}	12 April 2002	list
(189151) 2002 JE_{12}	3 May 2002	list
(189665) 2001 RY_{6}	10 September 2001	list
(189685) 2001 SY_{113}	20 September 2001	list
(189715) 2001 UX_{12}	24 October 2001	list
(189716) 2001 UT_{14}	24 October 2001	list
(189906) 2003 SU_{100}	20 September 2003	list
(190255) 2007 HG	16 April 2007	list
(190596) 2000 UP_{2}	23 October 2000	list
(190818) 2001 SR_{2}	17 September 2001	list
(190843) 2001 SM_{114}	20 September 2001	list
(190857) 2001 SW_{265}	25 September 2001	list
(190892) 2001 UA_{4}	17 October 2001	list
(190893) 2001 UW_{5}	21 October 2001	list
(191029) 2002 BR	21 January 2002	list
(191046) 2002 CN_{39}	11 February 2002	list
(191127) 2002 FC_{1}	18 March 2002	list

(191128) 2002 FM_{2}	19 March 2002	list
(191447) 2003 SV_{201}	26 September 2003	list
(191453) 2003 SZ_{217}	27 September 2003	list
(191726) 2004 RV_{287}	15 September 2004	list
(191745) 2004 SM_{20}	17 September 2004	list
(192082) 2006 BX_{145}	30 January 2006	list
(193869) 2001 QD_{153}	26 August 2001	list
(193884) 2001 QZ_{186}	21 August 2001	list
(193894) 2001 QH_{225}	24 August 2001	list
(193926) 2001 RW_{2}	9 September 2001	list
(193927) 2001 RQ_{5}	9 September 2001	list
(194002) 2001 SG_{1}	17 September 2001	list
(194003) 2001 SP_{2}	17 September 2001	list
(194125) 2001 SV_{266}	25 September 2001	list
(194148) 2001 SP_{350}	26 September 2001	list
(194152) 2001 TW_{7}	11 October 2001	list
(194159) 2001 TN_{18}	14 October 2001	list
(194160) 2001 TO_{18}	14 October 2001	list
(194209) 2001 TJ_{104}	15 October 2001	list
(194265) 2001 UB_{1}	17 October 2001	list
(194270) 2001 UT_{10}	21 October 2001	list
(194271) 2001 UN_{12}	24 October 2001	list
(194272) 2001 UU_{12}	24 October 2001	list
(194273) 2001 UH_{13}	24 October 2001	list
(194561) 2001 XF_{88}	14 December 2001	list

(194842) 2002 AX_{10}	11 January 2002	list
(194924) 2002 AP_{128}	14 January 2002	list
(194925) 2002 AS_{128}	14 January 2002	list
(194975) 2002 AO_{190}	11 January 2002	list
(194984) 2002 BO_{1}	19 January 2002	list
(194985) 2002 BR_{1}	20 January 2002	list
(194986) 2002 BC_{2}	19 January 2002	list
(195007) 2002 CW_{7}	6 February 2002	list
(195010) 2002 CF_{15}	9 February 2002	list
(195011) 2002 CB_{16}	10 February 2002	list
(195027) 2002 CJ_{39}	11 February 2002	list
(195032) 2002 CO_{50}	12 February 2002	list
(195033) 2002 CP_{50}	12 February 2002	list
(195040) 2002 CR_{58}	12 February 2002	list
(195091) 2002 CH_{118}	14 February 2002	list
(195234) 2002 EG_{11}	14 March 2002	list
(195235) 2002 EU_{12}	14 March 2002	list
(195353) 2002 FB_{1}	18 March 2002	list
(195385) 2002 GN_{7}	14 April 2002	list
(195386) 2002 GY_{7}	14 April 2002	list
(195388) 2002 GK_{9}	15 April 2002	list
(195392) 2002 GJ_{11}	14 April 2002	list
(195508) 2002 HJ	16 April 2002	list
(195517) 2002 JX_{1}	4 May 2002	list
(196239) 2003 CZ_{17}	7 February 2003	list

(196243) 2003 DS_{2}	22 February 2003	list
(196806) 2003 SQ_{218}	28 September 2003	list
(196808) 2003 SH_{223}	29 September 2003	list
(196811) 2003 SF_{225}	26 September 2003	list
(197519) 2004 DF_{1}	17 February 2004	list
(197580) 2004 HZ_{1}	20 April 2004	list
(198047) 2004 RL_{288}	15 September 2004	list
(198089) 2004 ST_{25}	22 September 2004	list
(199165) 2005 YK_{180}	30 December 2005	list
(199167) 2005 YH_{182}	30 December 2005	list
(199337) 2006 BE_{147}	31 January 2006	list
(200538) 2001 EH	2 March 2001	list
200578 Yungchuen	23 August 2001	list
(200584) 2001 QV_{163}	31 August 2001	list
(200619) 2001 ST_{73}	20 September 2001	list
(200625) 2001 SH_{113}	20 September 2001	list
(200660) 2001 TK_{45}	14 October 2001	list
(200661) 2001 TD_{49}	14 October 2001	list
(200790) 2001 XD_{88}	14 December 2001	list
(200957) 2002 CF_{11}	6 February 2002	list
(200958) 2002 CX_{13}	8 February 2002	list
(201074) 2002 FZ	18 March 2002	list
(201075) 2002 FG_{2}	19 March 2002	list
(201115) 2002 JX_{12}	8 May 2002	list
(201609) 2003 SS_{201}	26 September 2003	list

(201615) 2003 SV_{220}	29 September 2003	list
(201933) 2004 DO_{45}	26 February 2004	list
(201945) 2004 GD_{20}	15 April 2004	list
(202071) 2004 SN_{20}	17 September 2004	list
(202503) 2006 BZ_{146}	30 January 2006	list
(203250) 2001 QF_{89}	22 August 2001	list
(203271) 2001 RU_{5}	9 September 2001	list
(203272) 2001 RL_{6}	10 September 2001	list
(203286) 2001 SH_{2}	17 September 2001	list
(203304) 2001 SF_{265}	25 September 2001	list
(203337) 2001 UT_{15}	25 October 2001	list
(203543) 2002 CT_{59}	13 February 2002	list
(203601) 2002 DR_{1}	19 February 2002	list
(203623) 2002 FU	18 March 2002	list
(203624) 2002 FZ_{3}	20 March 2002	list
(203872) 2002 XP_{39}	9 December 2002	list
(203927) 2003 PO_{4}	3 August 2003	list^{[A]}
(203978) 2003 SV_{218}	28 September 2003	list
(204340) 2004 RX_{287}	15 September 2004	list
(205426) 2001 HT_{16}	25 April 2001	list
(205472) 2001 QS_{152}	26 August 2001	list
(205499) 2001 RD_{17}	11 September 2001	list
(205513) 2001 SG_{3}	17 September 2001	list
(205514) 2001 SP_{9}	18 September 2001	list
(205525) 2001 SA_{114}	20 September 2001	list

(205526) 2001 SE_{114}	20 September 2001	list
(205746) 2002 CY_{15}	9 February 2002	list
(205833) 2002 ES	5 March 2002	list
(205884) 2002 FC_{2}	19 March 2002	list
(205888) 2002 GE_{8}	14 April 2002	list
(205890) 2002 GC_{12}	15 April 2002	list
(205937) 2002 JT_{39}	10 May 2002	list
(206248) 2002 XU_{35}	7 December 2002	list
(206395) 2003 ST_{36}	18 September 2003	list
(206411) 2003 SS_{100}	20 September 2003	list
(206441) 2003 SY_{220}	29 September 2003	list
(206673) 2003 YC_{111}	27 December 2003	list
(206764) 2004 CR_{22}	12 February 2004	list
(207761) 2007 TJ_{4}	6 October 2007	list
(207776) 2007 TY_{73}	13 October 2007	list
(208316) 2001 ME	16 June 2001	list
(208348) 2001 RT_{2}	9 September 2001	list
(208539) 2002 AM_{13}	11 January 2002	list
(208589) 2002 CW_{117}	12 February 2002	list
(208653) 2002 FU_{3}	20 March 2002	list
208663 Xuxiyuan	12 April 2002	list
208664 Koojunyup	14 April 2002	list
(208700) 2002 JK	3 May 2002	list
(208961) 2002 XY_{14}	7 December 2002	list
(209110) 2003 SW_{129}	21 September 2003	list

(209376) 2004 EM_{24}	15 March 2004	list
(209489) 2004 JV	10 May 2004	list
(209516) 2004 RY_{287}	15 September 2004	list
(209634) 2005 BK	16 January 2005	list
(210138) 2006 SW_{19}	18 September 2006	list
(211049) 2002 CY_{51}	12 February 2002	list
(211050) 2002 CL_{52}	12 February 2002	list
(211051) 2002 CP_{52}	12 February 2002	list
(211080) 2002 EC_{12}	13 March 2002	list
(211164) 2002 HT	16 April 2002	list
(211166) 2002 HC_{7}	18 April 2002	list
(211169) 2002 JT	3 May 2002	list
(211170) 2002 JH_{2}	4 May 2002	list
(211568) 2003 SS_{129}	21 September 2003	list
(211806) 2004 DP_{22}	18 February 2004	list
(211815) 2004 DC_{72}	16 February 2004	list
(211884) 2004 JF_{5}	12 May 2004	list
(212510) 2006 RL_{22}	15 September 2006	list
(212749) 2007 TM_{4}	6 October 2007	list
(212848) 2007 VW_{34}	3 November 2007	list
(213751) 2002 XS_{66}	11 December 2002	list
(214016) 2004 DJ	16 February 2004	list
(215299) 2001 SC_{112}	20 September 2001	list
(215300) 2001 SM_{115}	20 September 2001	list
(215352) 2001 XZ_{87}	14 December 2001	list

(215432) 2002 JL_{129}	8 May 2002	list
215592 Normarose	3 August 2003	list^{[A]}
(215621) 2003 SA_{214}	26 September 2003	list
(215622) 2003 SJ_{223}	29 September 2003	list
(217225) 2002 XW_{14}	7 December 2002	list
(217358) 2004 SW_{25}	22 September 2004	list
(217932) 2001 TP_{49}	15 October 2001	list
(217949) 2001 UN_{5}	21 October 2001	list
(217950) 2001 UM_{15}	25 October 2001	list
(218032) 2002 AU_{9}	11 January 2002	list
(219274) 2000 BZ_{3}	28 January 2000	list
(219560) 2001 SX	17 September 2001	list
(219567) 2001 SB_{115}	20 September 2001	list
(219589) 2001 TA_{18}	14 October 2001	list
(219598) 2001 TF_{49}	15 October 2001	list
(219632) 2001 UC_{11}	22 October 2001	list
(219779) 2002 AS_{13}	11 January 2002	list
(219914) 2002 GX_{7}	14 April 2002	list
(219915) 2002 GB_{9}	14 April 2002	list
(219957) 2002 JZ_{4}	5 May 2002	list
(220244) 2002 XV_{42}	8 December 2002	list
(220494) 2004 DK	16 February 2004	list
(220499) 2004 DD_{10}	16 February 2004	list
(220507) 2004 DH_{44}	25 February 2004	list
(220515) 2004 EZ_{21}	15 March 2004	list

(220529) 2004 FG_{18}	28 March 2004	list
(220688) 2004 RQ_{287}	15 September 2004	list
(220689) 2004 RR_{287}	15 September 2004	list
(220716) 2004 SX_{25}	22 September 2004	list
(221488) 2006 CB	1 February 2006	list
(221489) 2006 CP_{9}	4 February 2006	list
(221775) 2007 HA_{5}	19 April 2007	list
(222450) 2001 QM_{210}	23 August 2001	list
(222544) 2001 UD_{219}	18 October 2001	list
(222693) 2002 AO_{9}	11 January 2002	list
(222694) 2002 AY_{9}	11 January 2002	list
(222695) 2002 AT_{13}	11 January 2002	list
(222757) 2002 CK_{39}	11 February 2002	list
(222832) 2002 EY_{12}	14 March 2002	list
(222909) 2002 JU_{1}	4 May 2002	list
(223269) 2003 GB_{22}	6 April 2003	list
(223421) 2003 SJ_{218}	28 September 2003	list
(223511) 2004 CE_{38}	13 February 2004	list
(223514) 2004 CM_{46}	13 February 2004	list
(223538) 2004 ER_{22}	15 March 2004	list
(223591) 2004 GA_{20}	15 April 2004	list
(224731) 2006 CK_{9}	3 February 2006	list
(225039) 2007 GY_{4}	11 April 2007	list
(225060) 2007 HG_{4}	16 April 2007	list
(225968) 2002 CF_{116}	12 February 2002	list

(226241) 2002 XU_{42}	8 December 2002	list
(226505) 2003 SC_{322}	27 September 2003	list
(226824) 2004 RW_{287}	15 September 2004	list
(226842) 2004 SV_{25}	22 September 2004	list
(227958) 2007 HH	16 April 2007	list
(228451) 2001 QF_{210}	23 August 2001	list
(228470) 2001 SK_{2}	17 September 2001	list
(228478) 2001 SS_{73}	20 September 2001	list
(228495) 2001 SA_{266}	25 September 2001	list
(228503) 2001 TX_{7}	11 October 2001	list
(228512) 2001 TH_{104}	15 October 2001	list
(228660) 2002 GP_{11}	14 April 2002	list
(228668) 2002 JF_{5}	5 May 2002	list
(228670) 2002 JY_{21}	9 May 2002	list
(228775) 2002 XK_{35}	8 December 2002	list
(228916) 2003 SF_{214}	26 September 2003	list
(229536) 2005 YC_{37}	26 December 2005	list
(229587) 2006 BA_{147}	31 January 2006	list
(229602) 2006 CO	1 February 2006	list
(229753) 2007 KA_{4}	23 May 2007	list
(230168) 2001 QO_{265}	26 August 2001	list
(230204) 2001 ST_{265}	25 September 2001	list
(230311) 2002 BF_{1}	19 January 2002	list
(230320) 2002 CJ_{52}	12 February 2002	list
(230374) 2002 GD_{9}	14 April 2002	list

(230583) 2003 CU_{16}	7 February 2003	list
(230669) 2003 SJ_{222}	27 September 2003	list
(230929) 2004 VJ_{55}	10 November 2004	list
(231996) 2001 SE_{3}	17 September 2001	list
(232017) 2001 SZ_{264}	25 September 2001	list
(232046) 2001 UQ_{2}	18 October 2001	list
(232048) 2001 UB_{11}	22 October 2001	list
(232049) 2001 UA_{13}	24 October 2001	list
(232141) 2002 CR_{13}	8 February 2002	list
(232189) 2002 FM_{4}	20 March 2002	list
(232824) 2004 SQ_{25}	22 September 2004	list
(234389) 2001 QP_{163}	31 August 2001	list
(234397) 2001 QN_{265}	26 August 2001	list
(234405) 2001 RX_{16}	11 September 2001	list
(234406) 2001 RO_{17}	11 September 2001	list
(234431) 2001 SO_{9}	18 September 2001	list
(234472) 2001 SY_{267}	25 September 2001	list
(234516) 2001 UP_{12}	24 October 2001	list
(234517) 2001 UP_{14}	24 October 2001	list
(235013) 2003 EM_{4}	6 March 2003	list
(235213) 2003 ST_{201}	26 September 2003	list
(235223) 2003 SA_{238}	26 September 2003	list
(235518) 2004 CE_{2}	12 February 2004	list
(235526) 2004 CJ_{51}	13 February 2004	list
(235676) 2004 RZ_{287}	15 September 2004	list

(235689) 2004 SL_{20}	17 September 2004	list
(236236) 2005 YB_{37}	26 December 2005	list
(237763) 2002 AL_{13}	11 January 2002	list
(237789) 2002 BL_{1}	19 January 2002	list
(237868) 2002 JC_{13}	8 May 2002	list
(237885) 2002 LE_{24}	9 June 2002	list
(238061) 2003 CG_{17}	7 February 2003	list
(238146) 2003 SQ_{36}	18 September 2003	list
(238179) 2003 SR_{219}	28 September 2003	list
(238180) 2003 SW_{221}	28 September 2003	list
(238361) 2004 CV_{39}	12 February 2004	list
(238429) 2004 HM_{20}	22 April 2004	list
(238610) 2005 BM	16 January 2005	list
(239493) 2007 VO_{34}	3 November 2007	list
(240093) 2002 CA_{52}	12 February 2002	list
(240370) 2003 SS_{219}	28 September 2003	list
(240849) 2006 BT_{147}	31 January 2006	list
(241198) 2007 TU_{4}	6 October 2007	list
(241218) 2007 TK_{68}	12 October 2007	list
(241319) 2007 VF_{73}	2 November 2007	list
(241854) 2001 TL_{104}	15 October 2001	list
(241922) 2002 BU	21 January 2002	list
(241931) 2002 CF_{39}	11 February 2002	list
(241968) 2002 GM_{11}	14 April 2002	list
(242246) 2003 SN_{222}	28 September 2003	list

(242251) 2003 SU_{252}	26 September 2003	list
(242535) 2005 BR	16 January 2005	list
(242802) 2006 BY_{55}	27 January 2006	list
(243086) 2007 PH_{2}	5 August 2007	list
(243145) 2007 TB_{15}	8 October 2007	list
(243914) 2001 HY_{22}	26 April 2001	list
(243951) 2001 QX_{163}	31 August 2001	list
(244012) 2001 SU_{114}	20 September 2001	list
(244013) 2001 SY_{114}	20 September 2001	list
(244081) 2001 UY_{5}	21 October 2001	list
(244225) 2002 BJ_{1}	19 January 2002	list
(244229) 2002 CZ_{15}	9 February 2002	list
(244297) 2002 FD_{4}	20 March 2002	list
(244331) 2002 JV_{21}	9 May 2002	list
(244778) 2003 SA_{167}	22 September 2003	list
(244793) 2003 SW_{218}	28 September 2003	list
(245016) 2004 DH_{10}	18 February 2004	list
(245019) 2004 DP_{59}	25 February 2004	list
(245029) 2004 EX_{21}	15 March 2004	list
(245144) 2004 RB_{288}	15 September 2004	list
(245272) 2005 BJ	16 January 2005	list
(245273) 2005 BQ	16 January 2005	list
(246250) 2007 TN_{4}	6 October 2007	list
(246259) 2007 TC_{15}	8 October 2007	list
(246415) 2007 VQ_{1}	2 November 2007	list

(247224) 2001 QG_{153}	23 August 2001	list
(247299) 2001 TK_{49}	15 October 2001	list
(247407) 2002 CT_{51}	12 February 2002	list
(247467) 2002 JZ_{12}	8 May 2002	list
(247660) 2002 XC_{67}	11 December 2002	list
(247829) 2003 SQ_{217}	27 September 2003	list
(247995) 2004 DJ_{10}	18 February 2004	list
(248000) 2004 DX_{59}	26 February 2004	list
(249889) 2001 RS_{43}	10 September 2001	list
(250007) 2002 AR_{9}	11 January 2002	list
(250023) 2002 CV_{7}	6 February 2002	list
(250030) 2002 CQ_{51}	12 February 2002	list
(250061) 2002 EO	5 March 2002	list
(250330) 2003 SA_{84}	19 September 2003	list
(250353) 2003 ST_{220}	29 September 2003	list
(250478) 2004 DF_{10}	18 February 2004	list
(252293) 2001 RO_{5}	9 September 2001	list
(252294) 2001 RB_{11}	10 September 2001	list
(252324) 2001 SX_{1}	17 September 2001	list
(252337) 2001 SN_{114}	20 September 2001	list
(252372) 2001 SF_{267}	25 September 2001	list
(252469) 2001 UR_{5}	21 October 2001	list
(252471) 2001 UC_{16}	25 October 2001	list
(252867) 2002 JG_{5}	5 May 2002	list
(253537) 2003 SP_{218}	28 September 2003	list

(253538) 2003 SX_{220}	29 September 2003	list
(253539) 2003 SX_{223}	30 September 2003	list
(253960) 2004 DK_{44}	25 February 2004	list
(256238) 2006 WD	16 November 2006	list
(256249) 2006 WC_{28}	22 November 2006	list
(256250) 2006 WE_{28}	22 November 2006	list
(256251) 2006 WF_{28}	22 November 2006	list
(256290) 2006 WL_{128}	26 November 2006	list
(256292) 2006 WF_{130}	28 November 2006	list
(256300) 2006 WK_{140}	19 November 2006	list
(256368) 2006 YV_{2}	22 December 2006	list
(258276) 2001 UG_{12}	24 October 2001	list
(258394) 2001 XA_{88}	14 December 2001	list
(258476) 2002 AN_{13}	11 January 2002	list
(258569) 2002 CT_{117}	12 February 2002	list
(258753) 2002 HL	16 April 2002	list
(259268) 2003 CL_{16}	7 February 2003	list
(259486) 2003 SH_{220}	27 September 2003	list
(259822) 2004 CN_{2}	12 February 2004	list
(259837) 2004 CX_{39}	12 February 2004	list
(260262) 2004 SK_{20}	17 September 2004	list
(260370) 2004 VN	2 November 2004	list
(260465) 2005 BZ_{3}	16 January 2005	list
(261783) 2006 BB_{147}	31 January 2006	list
(262538) 2006 VF	1 November 2006	list

(262620) 2006 WA_{2}	18 November 2006	list
(262622) 2006 WU_{2}	20 November 2006	list
(262630) 2006 WX_{27}	22 November 2006	list
(262670) 2006 WH_{128}	26 November 2006	list
(262706) 2006 XS_{4}	13 December 2006	list
(263115) 2007 UB_{3}	16 October 2007	list
(263214) 2008 AP_{30}	11 January 2008	list
(264506) 2001 QQ_{163}	31 August 2001	list
(264556) 2001 SG_{268}	25 September 2001	list
(264575) 2001 TE_{104}	15 October 2001	list
(264595) 2001 UX_{13}	24 October 2001	list
(264689) 2002 AV_{13}	12 January 2002	list
(265229) 2004 DE_{1}	17 February 2004	list
(265327) 2004 OS	17 July 2004	list
(266203) 2006 WJ_{28}	22 November 2006	list
(266228) 2006 XU_{4}	13 December 2006	list
(266251) 2006 YE_{2}	17 December 2006	list
(267266) 2001 QH_{265}	26 August 2001	list
(267415) 2002 BT_{1}	20 January 2002	list
(267416) 2002 BV_{1}	21 January 2002	list
(267424) 2002 CY_{50}	12 February 2002	list
(267476) 2002 GG_{12}	15 April 2002	list
(267793) 2003 SH_{218}	28 September 2003	list
(267983) 2004 GC_{20}	15 April 2004	list
(268163) 2004 VB_{1}	4 November 2004	list

(268167) 2004 VB_{55}	10 November 2004	list
(268842) 2006 WK_{128}	26 November 2006	list
(268862) 2006 YO_{2}	17 December 2006	list
(270115) 2001 RR_{43}	10 September 2001	list
(270139) 2001 SP_{1}	17 September 2001	list
(270141) 2001 SN_{9}	18 September 2001	list
(270242) 2001 US_{13}	24 October 2001	list
(270411) 2002 CO_{13}	8 February 2002	list
(270412) 2002 CX_{14}	9 February 2002	list
(270506) 2002 FP_{2}	19 March 2002	list
(271395) 2004 CU	10 February 2004	list
(271733) 2004 RN_{288}	15 September 2004	list
(273420) 2006 WA_{28}	22 November 2006	list
(273501) 2007 AK_{26}	12 January 2007	list
(273875) 2007 HM	17 April 2007	list
(273961) 2007 KC_{4}	23 May 2007	list
(275816) 2001 RC_{17}	11 September 2001	list
(275817) 2001 RK_{17}	11 September 2001	list
(275853) 2001 SN_{113}	20 September 2001	list
(276020) 2002 AX_{13}	12 January 2002	list
(276048) 2002 CP_{7}	6 February 2002	list
(276546) 2003 ST_{100}	20 September 2003	list
(276569) 2003 SL_{218}	28 September 2003	list
(276579) 2003 SM_{288}	28 September 2003	list
(276744) 2004 FK_{18}	28 March 2004	list

(278448) 2007 TX_{2}	3 October 2007	list
(279916) 2001 RU_{16}	11 September 2001	list
(279985) 2001 TJ_{231}	15 October 2001	list
(279987) 2001 UP_{15}	25 October 2001	list
(280118) 2002 JV_{1}	4 May 2002	list
(280324) 2003 SQ_{6}	17 September 2003	list
(280336) 2003 SV_{129}	21 September 2003	list
(281108) 2006 YC_{2}	17 December 2006	list
(281213) 2007 HT_{7}	17 April 2007	list
(281342) 2007 UP_{2}	18 October 2007	list
(282174) 2001 TP_{7}	11 October 2001	list
(282246) 2002 GE_{11}	12 April 2002	list
(283614) 2002 CQ_{50}	12 February 2002	list
(285919) 2001 QU_{183}	21 August 2001	list
(285989) 2001 SG_{2}	17 September 2001	list
(286075) 2001 SQ_{350}	26 September 2001	list
(286084) 2001 TV_{17}	14 October 2001	list
(286085) 2001 TJ_{18}	14 October 2001	list
(286165) 2001 US_{6}	18 October 2001	list
(286168) 2001 UY_{11}	23 October 2001	list
(286169) 2001 UX_{15}	25 October 2001	list
(286507) 2002 CW_{14}	9 February 2002	list
(286686) 2002 FB_{2}	19 March 2002	list
(286687) 2002 FW_{3}	20 March 2002	list
(287843) 2003 SO_{226}	26 September 2003	list

(288198) 2003 YX_{2}	18 December 2003	list
(288892) 2004 RU_{287}	15 September 2004	list
(289167) 2004 VC_{55}	10 November 2004	list
(291160) 2006 AE	2 January 2006	list
(293006) 2006 WU_{27}	22 November 2006	list
(293260) 2007 CE_{19}	9 February 2007	list
(293930) 2007 TQ_{4}	6 October 2007	list
(293988) 2007 TX_{73}	13 October 2007	list
(294211) 2007 UY	16 October 2007	list
(294213) 2007 US_{2}	18 October 2007	list
(294214) 2007 UC_{3}	16 October 2007	list
(294294) 2007 VD	1 November 2007	list
(294375) 2007 VY_{125}	9 November 2007	list
(294618) 2008 AJ_{29}	10 January 2008	list
(295239) 2008 GJ_{21}	11 April 2008	list
(297579) 2001 SX_{2}	17 September 2001	list
(297848) 2002 CS_{7}	6 February 2002	list
(297872) 2002 CR_{117}	12 February 2002	list
(297921) 2002 EM	5 March 2002	list
(297922) 2002 EE_{12}	14 March 2002	list
(298279) 2002 XV_{66}	10 December 2002	list
(298303) 2003 CY_{16}	7 February 2003	list
(298860) 2004 RP_{287}	15 September 2004	list
(299043) 2005 BL	16 January 2005	list
(299477) 2006 BU_{147}	31 January 2006	list

(299478) 2006 BC_{148}	31 January 2006	list
(300824) 2007 XR_{3}	3 December 2007	list
(302147) 2001 SF_{114}	20 September 2001	list
(302313) 2002 AK_{9}	11 January 2002	list
(302379) 2002 CT_{50}	12 February 2002	list
(302906) 2003 ST_{29}	18 September 2003	list
(302926) 2003 SF_{222}	27 September 2003	list
(303139) 2004 DM_{10}	18 February 2004	list
(304656) 2006 WW_{27}	22 November 2006	list
(304657) 2006 WY_{27}	22 November 2006	list
(304714) 2006 XB_{3}	11 December 2006	list
(304942) 2007 TK_{4}	6 October 2007	list
(304943) 2007 TO_{4}	6 October 2007	list
(304959) 2007 TX_{66}	12 October 2007	list
(306835) 2001 SE_{2}	17 September 2001	list
(306892) 2001 TB_{104}	15 October 2001	list
(307168) 2002 EB_{12}	12 March 2002	list
(307210) 2002 GT_{7}	14 April 2002	list
(309099) 2006 WC	16 November 2006	list
(309433) 2007 UU_{5}	19 October 2007	list
(309460) 2007 VC	1 November 2007	list
(310680) 2002 GA_{7}	12 April 2002	list
(311076) 2004 EY_{10}	15 March 2004	list
(311118) 2004 OQ	17 July 2004	list
(311553) 2006 BN_{100}	28 January 2006	list

(311932) 2007 CD_{19}	8 February 2007	list
312001 Siobhánhaughey	5 August 2007	list
(312177) 2007 VV_{5}	4 November 2007	list
(313148) 2001 DU_{14}	16 February 2001	list
(313203) 2001 RC_{7}	10 September 2001	list
(313210) 2001 SW_{1}	17 September 2001	list
(313328) 2002 FE_{4}	20 March 2002	list
(313519) 2002 XS_{4}	4 December 2002	list
(313528) 2002 XK_{37}	7 December 2002	list
(313672) 2003 SO_{220}	29 September 2003	list
(313673) 2003 SW_{223}	30 September 2003	list
(314968) 2006 XE	9 December 2006	list
(315343) 2007 UW_{2}	16 October 2007	list
(315370) 2007 VT_{9}	3 November 2007	list
(315507) 2008 AE_{30}	11 January 2008	list
(316499) 2010 VC_{111}	22 September 2004	list
(317028) 2001 QC_{230}	24 August 2001	list
(317123) 2001 US_{15}	25 October 2001	list
(317213) 2002 CW_{50}	12 February 2002	list
(317321) 2002 JZ_{1}	4 May 2002	list
(317595) 2002 XJ_{39}	9 December 2002	list
(317596) 2002 XK_{39}	9 December 2002	list
(317806) 2003 ST_{219}	28 September 2003	list
(317974) 2003 YD_{111}	27 December 2003	list
(318110) 2004 JK_{2}	12 May 2004	list

(318266) 2004 SH_{20}	17 September 2004	list
(319841) 2006 WB_{2}	18 November 2006	list
(319885) 2006 WH_{129}	26 November 2006	list
(319907) 2006 XP_{15}	10 December 2006	list
(320311) 2007 TT	3 October 2007	list
(320410) 2007 VE	1 November 2007	list
(320548) 2008 AR_{30}	11 January 2008	list
(323141) 2003 DC_{3}	22 February 2003	list
(323442) 2004 HB_{1}	19 April 2004	list
(324540) 2006 WT_{27}	22 November 2006	list
(324583) 2006 XZ	9 December 2006	list
(324602) 2006 YF_{2}	17 December 2006	list
(324845) 2007 KD_{4}	23 May 2007	list
(324864) 2007 TW_{66}	12 October 2007	list
(324971) 2008 AJ_{30}	11 January 2008	list
(325217) 2008 GF_{20}	8 April 2008	list
(325218) 2008 GZ_{20}	10 April 2008	list
(326104) 2011 CQ_{32}	12 August 2007	list
(326685) 2002 XT_{35}	7 December 2002	list
(326776) 2003 SL_{220}	29 September 2003	list
(326778) 2003 SF_{223}	28 September 2003	list
(326960) 2004 HL_{20}	22 April 2004	list
(327848) 2006 XN_{1}	11 December 2006	list
(328264) 2008 GG_{20}	8 April 2008	list
(328323) 2008 JB_{15}	7 May 2008	list

(328912) 2010 UW_{10}	14 October 2001	list
(329596) 2003 CJ_{17}	7 February 2003	list
(329648) 2003 SB_{218}	27 September 2003	list
(329753) 2004 CO_{91}	13 February 2004	list
(330166) 2006 BR_{147}	31 January 2006	list
(334021) 2000 WZ_{62}	18 November 2000	list
(334047) 2001 LR_{1}	13 June 2001	list
(334200) 2001 SZ_{265}	25 September 2001	list
(334294) 2001 UC_{219}	17 October 2001	list
(334392) 2002 CC_{118}	14 February 2002	list
(335690) 2006 WZ_{128}	27 November 2006	list
(335697) 2006 XL_{1}	11 December 2006	list
(337393) 2001 QO_{163}	31 August 2001	list
(337426) 2001 RJ_{11}	10 September 2001	list
(337439) 2001 RO_{43}	10 September 2001	list
(337560) 2001 SU_{264}	25 September 2001	list
(337561) 2001 SJ_{266}	25 September 2001	list
(337602) 2001 TR_{4}	20 September 2001	list
(337615) 2001 TQ_{48}	15 October 2001	list
(337709) 2001 UV_{12}	24 October 2001	list
(337968) 2002 CX_{51}	12 February 2002	list
(337996) 2002 EE_{11}	14 March 2002	list
(338356) 2002 XJ_{35}	8 December 2002	list
(338616) 2003 SX_{221}	28 September 2003	list
(338617) 2003 SQ_{226}	26 September 2003	list

(339037) 2004 JH_{1}	11 May 2004	list
(341319) 2007 TL_{4}	6 October 2007	list
(341320) 2007 TP_{4}	6 October 2007	list
(341545) 2007 UF_{3}	17 October 2007	list
(341546) 2007 UG_{3}	17 October 2007	list
(344292) 2001 UK_{12}	24 October 2001	list
(344436) 2002 GE_{12}	15 April 2002	list
(344563) 2002 XS_{35}	7 December 2002	list
(347380) 2012 RX_{17}	26 September 2003	list
(347621) 2001 SB_{114}	20 September 2001	list
(347644) 2001 TO_{45}	14 October 2001	list
(347669) 2001 UF_{12}	24 October 2001	list
(347777) 2002 CG_{230}	13 January 2002	list
(347782) 2002 CS_{283}	9 February 2002	list
(347926) 2003 CH_{17}	7 February 2003	list
(348001) 2003 SY_{213}	26 September 2003	list
(348012) 2003 SL_{288}	28 September 2003	list
(348158) 2004 HT_{1}	20 April 2004	list
(348708) 2006 CO_{9}	4 February 2006	list
(350336) 2012 UG_{100}	26 September 2003	list
(350614) 2001 SS_{113}	20 September 2001	list
(350662) 2001 UF_{11}	23 October 2001	list
(351279) 2004 SJ_{20}	17 September 2004	list
(352075) 2006 WM_{128}	26 November 2006	list
(352213) 2007 TW_{2}	3 October 2007	list

(352227) 2007 TV_{66}	12 October 2007	list
(354040) 2001 SC_{3}	17 September 2001	list
(354208) 2002 FT	18 March 2002	list
(354887) 2006 BC_{147}	31 January 2006	list
(355394) 2007 UX	16 October 2007	list
(357072) 2001 RG_{11}	10 September 2001	list
(357446) 2004 CY_{39}	12 February 2004	list
(357547) 2004 ST_{20}	17 September 2004	list
(358696) 2008 AQ_{30}	11 January 2008	list
(359332) 2009 PD_{13}	22 December 2006	list
(360307) 2001 SD_{3}	17 September 2001	list
(360339) 2001 UY_{13}	24 October 2001	list
(360340) 2001 UU_{15}	25 October 2001	list
(360376) 2002 CE_{51}	12 February 2002	list
(362644) 2011 SA_{202}	4 February 2006	list
(363171) 2001 TG_{49}	15 October 2001	list
(363458) 2003 SX_{216}	27 September 2003	list
(363581) 2004 CT_{1}	11 February 2004	list
(364544) 2007 GL_{6}	11 April 2007	list
(364623) 2007 TH_{14}	7 October 2007	list
(366608) 2003 CA_{17}	7 February 2003	list
(367029) 2006 CC	1 February 2006	list
(367713) 2010 TE_{41}	22 April 2004	list
(367900) 2012 BZ_{18}	16 January 2005	list
(368489) 2003 TF	1 October 2003	list

(369085) 2008 GU_{21}	8 April 2008	list
(370515) 2003 SK_{222}	27 September 2003	list
(370657) 2004 CQ_{37}	13 February 2004	list
(371247) 2006 BB_{148}	31 January 2006	list
(371505) 2006 UN_{63}	21 October 2006	list
(373619) 2002 FA_{1}	18 March 2002	list
(373880) 2003 SD_{214}	26 September 2003	list
(375105) 2007 TS_{79}	6 October 2007	list
(377268) 2004 DK_{40}	18 February 2004	list
(377387) 2004 RC_{288}	15 September 2004	list
(380241) 2001 UW_{11}	23 October 2001	list
(380850) 2006 BW_{54}	23 January 2006	list
(381070) 2006 YV_{51}	26 December 2006	list
(381251) 2007 TG_{120}	9 October 2007	list
(381263) 2007 TZ_{178}	7 October 2007	list
(382502) 2001 RR_{5}	9 September 2001	list
(382507) 2001 SN_{1}	17 September 2001	list
(382526) 2001 SY_{264}	25 September 2001	list
(382602) 2002 GW_{11}	15 April 2002	list
(382828) 2003 YW_{2}	18 December 2003	list
(383254) 2006 CJ_{9}	3 February 2006	list
(387624) 2002 JR_{21}	9 May 2002	list
(387717) 2003 DN_{4}	22 February 2003	list
(387808) 2004 EX_{10}	15 March 2004	list
(388647) 2007 TB_{193}	6 October 2007	list

(388700) 2007 VF_{35}	3 November 2007	list
(388782) 2008 AM_{30}	11 January 2008	list
(390590) 2001 SC_{1}	17 September 2001	list
(390691) 2002 XC_{15}	7 December 2002	list
(390824) 2004 OT	17 July 2004	list
(390876) 2004 TV_{239}	22 September 2004	list
(393583) 2003 SM_{218}	28 September 2003	list
(394344) 2006 YL	17 December 2006	list
(394470) 2007 TT_{4}	6 October 2007	list
(394473) 2007 TC_{18}	9 October 2007	list
(394483) 2007 TN_{68}	12 October 2007	list
(394569) 2007 VN_{34}	3 November 2007	list
(396747) 2003 SQ_{219}	28 September 2003	list
(397588) 2007 VS_{7}	2 November 2007	list
(402741) 2006 XL	9 December 2006	list
(403045) 2008 AD_{29}	1 January 2008	list
(405203) 2003 GC_{57}	7 April 2003	list
(405262) 2003 SK_{288}	28 September 2003	list
(406189) 2006 WP_{128}	26 November 2006	list
(408887) 2001 UE_{12}	24 October 2001	list
(408889) 2001 UO_{14}	24 October 2001	list
(408980) 2002 RB_{126}	11 September 2002	list
(409067) 2003 SO_{222}	28 September 2003	list
(410001) 2006 WV_{27}	22 November 2006	list
(410021) 2006 WO_{178}	24 November 2006	list

(413242) 2003 SU_{213}	26 September 2003	list
(413438) 2005 BN	16 January 2005	list
(414134) 2007 VQ_{84}	6 November 2007	list
(415869) 2001 SD_{268}	25 September 2001	list
(416043) 2002 FT_{3}	20 March 2002	list
(416337) 2003 SM_{222}	28 September 2003	list
(417608) 2006 WS_{2}	20 November 2006	list
(417953) 2007 TM_{68}	12 October 2007	list
(418012) 2007 UZ_{2}	16 October 2007	list
(422751) 2001 SU_{267}	25 September 2001	list
(423143) 2004 DO_{59}	25 February 2004	list
(423233) 2004 SS_{25}	22 September 2004	list
(427685) 2004 DJ_{44}	25 February 2004	list
(427716) 2004 GW_{2}	12 April 2004	list
(428401) 2007 TZ_{14}	8 October 2007	list
(430529) 2002 CC_{16}	10 February 2002	list
(434196) 2003 HG_{2}	24 April 2003	list
(434225) 2003 SQ_{201}	26 September 2003	list
(435405) 2008 AL_{30}	11 January 2008	list
(437148) 2012 VN_{21}	23 April 2004	list
(438449) 2006 YB_{2}	17 December 2006	list
(440183) 2004 CU_{37}	13 February 2004	list
(443900) 2002 CU_{13}	8 February 2002	list
(443970) 2003 SB_{312}	30 September 2003	list
(445543) 2011 FU_{154}	12 April 2004	list

(452353) 2001 UR_{15}	25 October 2001	list
(452468) 2003 WM_{158}	28 September 2003	list
(455289) 2002 CF_{118}	14 February 2002	list
(456364) 2006 TW_{112}	25 February 2004	list
(461521) 2003 SE_{214}	26 September 2003	list
(463293) 2012 HO_{40}	7 December 2002	list
(463632) 2013 TW_{67}	28 May 2008	list
(468460) 2003 YA	16 December 2003	list
(469658) 2004 TQ_{196}	22 September 2004	list
(472229) 2014 FD_{66}	26 September 2003	list
(472391) 2015 BU_{132}	20 April 2004	list
(474249) 2001 SU_{113}	20 September 2001	list
(474453) 2003 SY_{36}	19 September 2003	list
(475344) 2006 BO_{98}	28 January 2006	list
(475750) 2006 WU_{128}	23 November 2006	list
(475783) 2006 XR_{2}	12 December 2006	list
(480945) 2003 SD_{217}	27 September 2003	list
(484337) 2007 UY_{6}	19 October 2007	list
(484350) 2007 VW_{9}	3 November 2007	list
(488750) 2004 SR_{25}	22 September 2004	list
(494242) 2016 PL_{29}	10 January 2008	list
(496644) 2016 AW_{95}	4 March 2006	list
(497121) 2004 GY_{19}	13 April 2004	list
(503891) 2001 UT_{6}	18 October 2001	list
(506461) 2002 FS	18 March 2002	list

(514596) 2003 FG	23 March 2003	list
(517537) 2014 SU_{154}	21 September 2001	list
(528097) 2008 GE_{20}	8 April 2008	list
(545039) 2014 XC_{43}	26 October 2014	list
(546986) 2010 CJ_{24}	5 August 2007	list
(547383) 2010 QO_{7}	7 February 2003	list
(550637) 2012 RW_{37}	17 September 2001	list
(552242) 013 VW_{6}	7 December 2002	list
(563504) 2016 CW_{282}	30 December 2005	list
(569998) 2006 BP_{100}	28 January 2006	list
(570816) 2006 WW_{2}	20 November 2006	list
(577355) 2013 CA_{18}	12 January 2007	list
(587114) 2005 TV_{200}	23 April 2004	list
(587455) 2006 BN_{98}	28 January 2006	list
(587899) 2007 AH_{6}	17 December 2006	list
(591103) 2013 CK_{137}	12 January 2007	list
(591662) 2014 BU_{1}	27 November 2000	list
(592317) 2014 SL_{315}	15 October 2007	list
(597478) 2007 HS	18 April 2007	list
(598173) 2008 GN_{21}	12 April 2008	list
(599910) 2011 BP_{27}	9 February 2003	list
(605508) 2016 NP_{68}	5 August 2007	list
(608464) 2003 UR_{207}	26 September 2003	list
(612277) 2001 TZ_{103}	15 October 2001	list
(612328) 2002 CJ_{50}	12 February 2002	list

(613690) 2006 WO_{128}	26 November 2006	list
(613816) 2007 TR_{4}	6 October 2007	list
(618870) 2004 HY_{82}	23 April 2004	list
(620441) 2003 TP_{57}	6 October 2003	list
(626644) 2007 UR_{29}	6 October 2007	list
(631255) 2006 XQ_{1}	11 December 2006	list
(632335) 2008 FS_{21}	17 December 2006	list
(636382) 2014 RY_{64}	16 February 2007	list
(652097) 2013 TO_{32}	28 September 2003	list
(654207) 2015 AM_{17}	17 July 2004	list
(660518) 2002 AH_{93}	13 January 2002	list
(663627) 2007 TS_{94}	6 October 2007	list
(664371) 2008 KW_{11}	28 May 2008	list
(670181) 2013 HY_{2}	25 March 2007	list
(677723) 2017 CP_{12}	16 September 2015	list
(679100) 2018 SF_{8}	26 November 2006	list
(680354) 2001 SM_{95}	9 September 2001	list
(683307) 2007 TX_{14}	8 October 2007	list
(697498) 2017 DF_{80}	17 December 2006	list
(703341) 2007 PR_{2}	8 August 2007	list
(707081) 2011 BF_{25}	21 December 2006	list
(724148) 2007 UC_{5}	6 October 2007	list
(731044) 2012 XJ_{153}	23 October 2001	list
(734017) 2014 WW_{222}	27 April 2007	list
(734562) 2015 BY_{27}	3 August 2003	list^{[A]}

(740516) 2003 SL_{223}	29 September 2003	list
(742875) 2008 AD_{30}	1 January 2008	list
(745407) 2011 BK_{19}	9 December 2006	list
(751694) 2015 FF_{308}	22 April 2004	list
(764723) 2013 HT_{17}	12 February 2002	list
(767905) 2015 AT_{101}	8 August 2007	list
(775703) 2006 XF	9 December 2006	list
(775704) 2006 XM_{1}	11 December 2006	list
(804270) 2015 XU_{207}	1 December 2015	list
(812105) 2003 UL_{116}	28 September 2003	list
(829821) 2007 HF	16 April 2007	list
(833898) 2010 LS_{131}	26 November 2006	list
(842791) 2015 XV_{457}	2 December 2015	list
(844213) 2016 TZ_{114}	28 September 2003	list
(851035) 2007 TE_{24}	6 October 2007	list
(863225) 2014 SK_{356}	22 September 2014	list
(867403) 2015 XA_{135}	30 November 2015	list
(870918) 2017 FH_{146}	4 December 2015	list
(875274) 2002 NN_{39}	7 July 2002	list
(875371) 2003 SH_{217}	27 September 2003	list
(876451) 2008 KP_{48}	28 May 2008	list
Co-discovery made with:^{A} J. Riffle

== See also ==
- List of minor planet discoverers § W. K. Y. Yeung
