= 151997 Bauhinia =

Main-belt asteroid

Discovery
- Discovered by: W. K. Y. Yeung
- Discovery site: Desert Eagle Obs.
- Discovery date: 11 May 2004

Designations
- Pronunciation: /baʊˈhɪniə/
- Named after: Bauhinia blakeana (flowering plant)
- Alternative designations: 2004 JL_{1} · 2001 QJ_{143}
- Minor planet category: main-belt · (inner) background

Orbital characteristics
- Epoch 4 September 2017 (JD 2458000.5)
- Uncertainty parameter 0
- Observation arc: 16.96 yr (6,195 days)
- Aphelion: 2.6843 AU
- Perihelion: 1.9336 AU
- Semi-major axis: 2.3089 AU
- Eccentricity: 0.1626
- Orbital period (sidereal): 3.51 yr (1,281 days)
- Mean anomaly: 252.41°
- Mean motion: 0° 16^{m} 51.24^{s} / day
- Inclination: 0.7145°
- Longitude of ascending node: 235.60°
- Argument of perihelion: 41.696°

Physical characteristics
- Mean diameter: 0.91 km (est. at 0.20)
- Absolute magnitude (H): 17.6

151997 Bauhinia (provisional designation 2004 JL_{1}) is a sub-kilometer background asteroid from the inner regions of the asteroid belt, approximately 900 meters in diameter. It was discovered on 11 May 2004, by Canadian astronomer William Yeung at the Desert Eagle Observatory, Arizona, United States. It was named after the flowering plant Bauhinia blakeana, also known as the "Hong Kong Orchid Tree".

== Orbit and classification ==
Bauhinia is a non-family from the main belt's background population. It orbits the Sun in the inner main-belt at a distance of 1.9–2.7 AU once every 3 years and 6 months (1,281 days; semi-major axis of 2.31 AU). Its orbit has an eccentricity of 0.16 and an inclination of 1° with respect to the ecliptic.

The body's observation arc begins with its first observation by Spacewatch at Kitt Peak National Observatory in November 1998, more than 5 years prior to its official discovery observation at Desert Eagle Observatory.

== Physical characteristics ==
The asteroid's spectral type is unknown.

=== Diameter and albedo ===
Bauhinia has not been observed by any of the space-based surveys such as the Infrared Astronomical Satellite IRAS, the Japanese Akari satellite or the NEOWISE mission of NASA's Wide-field Infrared Survey Explorer. Based on a generic magnitude-to-diameter conversion, the asteroid measures 0.91 kilometers in diameter based on an absolute magnitude of 17.6 and a geometric albedo of 0.20, which roughly corresponds to a body of stony composition, the most common type in the inner asteroid belt.

=== Rotation period ===
As of 2018, no rotational lightcurve of Bauhinia has been obtained from photometric observations. The body's rotation period, shape and poles remain unknown.

== Naming ==
This minor planet was named after the legume tree with orchid-like flowers, Bauhinia blakeana, commonly called the Hong Kong Orchid Tree. The official naming citation was published by the Minor Planet Center on 1 June 2007 (M.P.C. 59925).
