= MV ASL Bauhinia =

Chinese-owned container ship

History
- Port of registry: Hong Kong
- Completed: 2022
- Identification: IMO number: 9935868; MMSI number: 477856700

General characteristics
- Class & type: Container ship
- Tonnage: 18,526 GT
- Length: 172 m (564 ft 4 in)
- Beam: 27.5 m (90 ft 3 in)

MV ASL Bauhinia is a Chinese-owned container ship built in 2022. The vessel is registered in Hong Kong and has an all-Chinese crew. In January 2025, the ship caught fire while transiting in the Red Sea and was abandoned by its crew. It has a tonnage of 18,526 GT, a cargo capacity of 1,930 TEU, a length of 172 metres (564 ft 4 in), and a beam of 27.5 metres (90 ft 3 in).

== History ==
ASL Bauhinia was built in 2022 and was operated by Emirates Shipping Line, who chartered the vessel from Asean Seas Line. It was the first Asean Seas Line ship with more than 1,900 TEU of cargo capacity.

=== Red Sea Explosion ===
ASL Bauhinia departed from Jebel Ali, United Arab Emirates, on 22 January 2025 for Jeddah, Saudi Arabia, with a cargo that included hazardous materials. On 28 January, while the ship was transiting in the Red Sea off the coast of Yemen, an explosion occurred and the ship caught fire. The crew abandoned ship with no injuries and were picked up by another vessel, leaving ASL Bauhinia to drift. The United States Central Command Joint Maritime Information Center said the explosion was not related to attacks by Houthi fighters in the ongoing Red Sea Crisis, and the fire was believed to have been a container fire caused by the ship's hazardous cargo.
