= Željko Ivezić =

Croatian-American astrophysicist

Željko Ivezić (born 1965 in Sarajevo) is a Croatian-American astrophysicist.

After receiving his PhD in physics from the University of Kentucky in 1995, where he worked on dust radiative transfer models (he wrote the code Dusty), he moved to Princeton University in 1997 to work on the Sloan Digital Sky Survey (SDSS) being the principal author of the SDSS Moving Object Catalogue (SDSS-MOC). After Princeton, he took a professorship at the University of Washington in 2004.

He has co-authored over 250 scientific papers. Since 2021, he has been the Director of Construction at the Vera C. Rubin Observatory; previously, he was the Deputy Director and Project Scientist. He is also a member of the science advisory groups for the EVLA, VAO and LIGO projects.

== Awards and honors ==
He was elected a Legacy Fellow of the American Astronomical Society in 2020.

Asteroid 202930 Ivezić, discovered by the Sloan Digital Sky Survey at Apache Point Observatory in 1998, was named after him. The official naming citation was published by the Minor Planet Center on 30 January 2010 (M.P.C. 68449).
