= Meanings of minor-planet names: 202001–203000 =

As minor planet discoveries are confirmed, they are given a permanent number by the IAU's Minor Planet Center (MPC), and the discoverers can then submit names for them, following the IAU's naming conventions. The list below concerns those minor planets in the specified number-range that have received names, and explains the meanings of those names.

Official naming citations of newly named small Solar System bodies are approved and published in a bulletin by IAU's Working Group for Small Bodies Nomenclature (WGSBN). Before May 2021, citations were published in MPC's Minor Planet Circulars for many decades. Recent citations can also be found on the JPL Small-Body Database (SBDB). Until his death in 2016, German astronomer Lutz D. Schmadel compiled these citations into the Dictionary of Minor Planet Names (DMP) and regularly updated the collection.

Based on Paul Herget's The Names of the Minor Planets, Schmadel also researched the unclear origin of numerous asteroids, most of which had been named prior to World War II. This article incorporates text from this source, which is in the public domain: SBDB New namings may only be added to this list below after official publication as the preannouncement of names is condemned. The WGSBN publishes a comprehensive guideline for the naming rules of non-cometary small Solar System bodies.

== 202001–202100 ==
Named minor planet	Provisional	This minor planet was named for...	Ref · Catalog
202092 Algirdas	2004 TD_{17}	Algirdas (1296–1377), a monarch of medieval Lithuania.	JPL · 202092
202093 Jogaila	2004 TP_{17}	Jogaila, later Władysław II Jagiełło (1348–1434) was the Grand Duke of Lithuania (1377–1434) and then the King of Poland (1386–1434). He joined two states that became the leading power of eastern Europe and was the founder of Poland's Jagiellon dynasty.	IAU · 202093

== 202101–202200 ==
back to top

Named minor planet	Provisional	This minor planet was named for...	Ref · Catalog
There are no named minor planets in this number range

== 202201–202300 ==
back to top

Named minor planet	Provisional	This minor planet was named for...	Ref · Catalog
There are no named minor planets in this number range

== 202301–202400 ==
back to top

Named minor planet	Provisional	This minor planet was named for...	Ref · Catalog
202373 Ubuntu	2005 EW_{302}	Ubuntu, a philosophy focusing on people's relations with each other, emphasizes unity. Its origin is in the native languages of southern Africa and it is one of the founding principles of the new South Africa	JPL · 202373

== 202401–202500 ==
back to top

Named minor planet	Provisional	This minor planet was named for...	Ref · Catalog
There are no named minor planets in this number range

== 202501–202600 ==
back to top

Named minor planet	Provisional	This minor planet was named for...	Ref · Catalog
202505 Farhang	2006 BK_{149}	Sheila Farhang, American dermatologist specializing in Mohs micrographic surgery and cosmetic dermatology.	IAU · 202505
202599 Harkányi	2006 HS_{18}	Béla Harkányi (1869–1932), a Hungarian astrophysicist and mathematician.	IAU · 202599

== 202601–202700 ==
back to top

Named minor planet	Provisional	This minor planet was named for...	Ref · Catalog
202605 Shenchunshan	2006 HY_{30}	Shen Chun-shan (1932–2018), Chinese physicist and president of the National Tsing Hua University in Taiwan	JPL · 202605
202614 Kayleigh	2006 HD_{58}	Kayleigh Lucille Stamp (1996–2010), the eldest granddaughter of the Australian discoverer David R. Herald	JPL · 202614
202686 Birkfellner	2007 CH_{54}	Wolfgang Birkfellner (born 1970), an Austrian medical physicist and amateur astronomer.	JPL · 202686

== 202701–202800 ==
back to top

Named minor planet	Provisional	This minor planet was named for...	Ref · Catalog
202704 Utena	2007 GN_{6}	Utena, city in north-east Lithuania	JPL · 202704
202736 Julietclare	2007 KB_{2}	Juliet Clare Datson (born 1980), astronomer, former student of the Max Planck Institute for Astronomy in Heidelberg, Germany	JPL · 202736
202740 Vicsympho	2007 LB_{30}	Victoria Symphony, Canadian orchestra based in Victoria, British Columbia	JPL · 202740
202750 Christophertonge	2007 PQ_{7}	Christopher M. Tonge, American chemist.	IAU · 202750
202778 Dmytria	2007 UN_{3}	Dmytro Yatskiv (1963–2004), laser physicist and observer at Kyiv satellite laser ranging station	JPL · 202778
202784 Gangkeda	2008 DJ_{69}	Gangkeda, the Mandarin Chinese Pinyin abbreviation for the Hong Kong University of Science and Technology (Xiānggǎng Kējì Dàxué), which was founded in 1991	JPL · 202784
202787 Kestecher	2008 OG	Natalie Kestecher (born 1961), Australian radio producer	JPL · 202787
202790 Babits	2008 QR_{3}	Mihály Babits (1883–1941), Hungarian poet, writer, literary historian and translator.	JPL · 202790

== 202801–202900 ==
back to top

Named minor planet	Provisional	This minor planet was named for...	Ref · Catalog
202806 Sierrastars	2008 SW_{2}	Sierra Stars Observatory (G68), located in Markleeville, California	JPL · 202806
202819 Carlosánchez	2008 SY_{81}	Carlos Sánchez Magro (1944–1985), Spanish astrophysicist and pioneer in infrared astronomy	JPL · 202819

== 202901–203000 ==
back to top

Named minor planet	Provisional	This minor planet was named for...	Ref · Catalog
202907 Meisenheimer	1996 RH_{1}	German astronomer Klaus Meisenheimer (1951–2023).	IAU · 202907
202909 Jakoten	1996 TF_{12}	Jakoten, a traditional Japanese food	JPL · 202909
202930 Ivezić	1998 SG_{172}	Željko Ivezić (born 1965), a Croatian-American astrophysicist, telescope builder for the Sloan Digital Sky Survey (SDDS) and a principal author of the SDSS Moving Object Catalogue	JPL · 202930

back to top

Preceded by 201,001–202,000	Meanings of minor-planet names List of minor planets: 202,001–203,000	Succeeded by 203,001–204,000
