= List of minor planets: 202001–203000 =

The following is a partial list of minor planets, running from minor-planet number 202001 through 203000, inclusive. The primary data for this and other partial lists is based on JPL's "Small-Body Orbital Elements" and data available from the Minor Planet Center. Critical list information is also provided by the MPC, unless otherwise specified from Lowell Observatory. A detailed description of the table's columns and additional sources are given on the main page including a complete list of every page in this series, and a statistical break-up on the dynamical classification of minor planets.

Also see the summary list of all named bodies in numerical and alphabetical order, and the corresponding naming citations for the number range of this particular list. New namings may only be added to this list after official publication, as the preannouncement of names is condemned by the Working Group for Small Bodies Nomenclature of the International Astronomical Union.

Near-Earth obj.	MBA (inner)	MBA (outer)	Centaur
Mars-crosser	MBA (middle)	Jupiter trojan	Trans-Neptunian obj.
Unclassified

== 202001–202100 ==
Designation			Discovery			Properties		Ref
Permanent	Provisional	Named after	Date	Site	Discoverer(s)	Category	Diam.	Ref
202001	2004 PV_{113}	—	August 9, 2004	Anderson Mesa	LONEOS	·	1.5 km	MPC · JPL
202002	2004 QW_{7}	—	August 22, 2004	Wise	Wise	·	1.3 km	MPC · JPL
202003	2004 QQ_{9}	—	August 21, 2004	Siding Spring	SSS	(5)	1.5 km	MPC · JPL
202004	2004 QT_{9}	—	August 21, 2004	Siding Spring	SSS	·	1.6 km	MPC · JPL
202005	2004 QZ_{13}	—	August 24, 2004	Socorro	LINEAR	PHO	2.4 km	MPC · JPL
202006	2004 QC_{14}	—	August 24, 2004	Socorro	LINEAR	·	2.5 km	MPC · JPL
202007	2004 QS_{24}	—	August 26, 2004	Catalina	CSS	NYS	1.6 km	MPC · JPL
202008	2004 QX_{26}	—	August 21, 2004	Siding Spring	SSS	·	1.3 km	MPC · JPL
202009	2004 RN_{5}	—	September 4, 2004	Palomar	NEAT	·	1.2 km	MPC · JPL
202010	2004 RE_{12}	—	September 8, 2004	St. Véran	St. Veran	NYS	1.4 km	MPC · JPL
202011	2004 RW_{16}	—	September 7, 2004	Socorro	LINEAR	·	1.4 km	MPC · JPL
202012	2004 RC_{20}	—	September 7, 2004	Socorro	LINEAR	PHO	1.5 km	MPC · JPL
202013	2004 RS_{27}	—	September 6, 2004	Siding Spring	SSS	·	1.3 km	MPC · JPL
202014	2004 RT_{28}	—	September 6, 2004	Siding Spring	SSS	·	1.3 km	MPC · JPL
202015	2004 RC_{33}	—	September 7, 2004	Socorro	LINEAR	V	980 m	MPC · JPL
202016	2004 RL_{35}	—	September 7, 2004	Socorro	LINEAR	MAS	950 m	MPC · JPL
202017	2004 RA_{37}	—	September 7, 2004	Socorro	LINEAR	NYS	1.4 km	MPC · JPL
202018	2004 RA_{43}	—	September 8, 2004	Socorro	LINEAR	NYS	1.4 km	MPC · JPL
202019	2004 RO_{43}	—	September 8, 2004	Socorro	LINEAR	V	960 m	MPC · JPL
202020	2004 RQ_{45}	—	September 8, 2004	Socorro	LINEAR	NYS	1.1 km	MPC · JPL
202021	2004 RX_{45}	—	September 8, 2004	Socorro	LINEAR	·	1.5 km	MPC · JPL
202022	2004 RE_{46}	—	September 8, 2004	Socorro	LINEAR	·	2.0 km	MPC · JPL
202023	2004 RZ_{48}	—	September 8, 2004	Socorro	LINEAR	·	1.3 km	MPC · JPL
202024	2004 RZ_{53}	—	September 8, 2004	Socorro	LINEAR	·	900 m	MPC · JPL
202025	2004 RP_{54}	—	September 8, 2004	Socorro	LINEAR	MAS	930 m	MPC · JPL
202026	2004 RY_{54}	—	September 8, 2004	Socorro	LINEAR	·	1.4 km	MPC · JPL
202027	2004 RS_{56}	—	September 8, 2004	Socorro	LINEAR	NYS	1.3 km	MPC · JPL
202028	2004 RJ_{59}	—	September 8, 2004	Socorro	LINEAR	·	1.9 km	MPC · JPL
202029	2004 RC_{62}	—	September 8, 2004	Socorro	LINEAR	·	920 m	MPC · JPL
202030	2004 RK_{65}	—	September 8, 2004	Socorro	LINEAR	·	1.8 km	MPC · JPL
202031	2004 RK_{67}	—	September 8, 2004	Socorro	LINEAR	·	1.8 km	MPC · JPL
202032	2004 RP_{67}	—	September 8, 2004	Socorro	LINEAR	·	2.2 km	MPC · JPL
202033	2004 RS_{71}	—	September 8, 2004	Socorro	LINEAR	V	940 m	MPC · JPL
202034	2004 RL_{73}	—	September 8, 2004	Socorro	LINEAR	PHO	2.1 km	MPC · JPL
202035	2004 RK_{77}	—	September 8, 2004	Socorro	LINEAR	·	1.7 km	MPC · JPL
202036	2004 RE_{78}	—	September 8, 2004	Socorro	LINEAR	MAS	1.0 km	MPC · JPL
202037	2004 RL_{85}	—	September 9, 2004	Bergisch Gladbach	W. Bickel	NYS	1.4 km	MPC · JPL
202038	2004 RA_{101}	—	September 8, 2004	Socorro	LINEAR	·	2.0 km	MPC · JPL
202039	2004 RZ_{103}	—	September 8, 2004	Palomar	NEAT	·	1.5 km	MPC · JPL
202040	2004 RN_{104}	—	September 8, 2004	Palomar	NEAT	·	2.0 km	MPC · JPL
202041	2004 RS_{108}	—	September 9, 2004	Kitt Peak	Spacewatch	·	1.1 km	MPC · JPL
202042	2004 RW_{135}	—	September 7, 2004	Kitt Peak	Spacewatch	NYS	1.3 km	MPC · JPL
202043	2004 RP_{143}	—	September 8, 2004	Socorro	LINEAR	(6769)	1.9 km	MPC · JPL
202044	2004 RU_{146}	—	September 9, 2004	Socorro	LINEAR	·	1.5 km	MPC · JPL
202045	2004 RV_{149}	—	September 9, 2004	Socorro	LINEAR	·	1.4 km	MPC · JPL
202046	2004 RS_{153}	—	September 10, 2004	Socorro	LINEAR	V	1.1 km	MPC · JPL
202047	2004 RM_{155}	—	September 10, 2004	Socorro	LINEAR	·	3.7 km	MPC · JPL
202048	2004 RW_{157}	—	September 10, 2004	Socorro	LINEAR	·	1.2 km	MPC · JPL
202049	2004 RG_{166}	—	September 7, 2004	Socorro	LINEAR	·	1.3 km	MPC · JPL
202050	2004 RF_{167}	—	September 7, 2004	Socorro	LINEAR	·	1.6 km	MPC · JPL
202051	2004 RW_{177}	—	September 10, 2004	Socorro	LINEAR	EUN	1.3 km	MPC · JPL
202052	2004 RF_{190}	—	September 10, 2004	Socorro	LINEAR	·	3.0 km	MPC · JPL
202053	2004 RH_{192}	—	September 10, 2004	Socorro	LINEAR	·	1.7 km	MPC · JPL
202054	2004 RA_{193}	—	September 10, 2004	Socorro	LINEAR	·	1.9 km	MPC · JPL
202055	2004 RS_{196}	—	September 10, 2004	Socorro	LINEAR	·	3.9 km	MPC · JPL
202056	2004 RN_{227}	—	September 9, 2004	Kitt Peak	Spacewatch	·	1.8 km	MPC · JPL
202057	2004 RV_{229}	—	September 9, 2004	Kitt Peak	Spacewatch	·	1.6 km	MPC · JPL
202058	2004 RD_{250}	—	September 13, 2004	Socorro	LINEAR	NYS	1.1 km	MPC · JPL
202059	2004 RB_{265}	—	September 10, 2004	Kitt Peak	Spacewatch	MAS	830 m	MPC · JPL
202060	2004 RH_{291}	—	September 10, 2004	Socorro	LINEAR	V	900 m	MPC · JPL
202061	2004 RN_{292}	—	September 10, 2004	Socorro	LINEAR	V	1.1 km	MPC · JPL
202062	2004 RG_{309}	—	September 13, 2004	Socorro	LINEAR	·	1.3 km	MPC · JPL
202063	2004 RX_{323}	—	September 13, 2004	Socorro	LINEAR	·	1.8 km	MPC · JPL
202064	2004 RT_{333}	—	September 15, 2004	Anderson Mesa	LONEOS	·	1.6 km	MPC · JPL
202065	2004 RK_{335}	—	September 15, 2004	Kitt Peak	Spacewatch	CLA	2.4 km	MPC · JPL
202066	2004 RT_{339}	—	September 8, 2004	Socorro	LINEAR	·	1.7 km	MPC · JPL
202067	2004 RW_{339}	—	September 8, 2004	Socorro	LINEAR	·	1.7 km	MPC · JPL
202068	2004 SA_{4}	—	September 17, 2004	Socorro	LINEAR	MAS	920 m	MPC · JPL
202069	2004 SN_{4}	—	September 17, 2004	Kitt Peak	Spacewatch	·	1.6 km	MPC · JPL
202070	2004 SG_{11}	—	September 16, 2004	Siding Spring	SSS	·	1.3 km	MPC · JPL
202071	2004 SN_{20}	—	September 17, 2004	Desert Eagle	W. K. Y. Yeung	·	1.6 km	MPC · JPL
202072	2004 SJ_{24}	—	September 17, 2004	Kitt Peak	Spacewatch	·	1.6 km	MPC · JPL
202073	2004 SL_{24}	—	September 17, 2004	Kitt Peak	Spacewatch	·	1.0 km	MPC · JPL
202074	2004 SP_{24}	—	September 18, 2004	Socorro	LINEAR	·	1.4 km	MPC · JPL
202075	2004 SF_{30}	—	September 17, 2004	Socorro	LINEAR	·	1.3 km	MPC · JPL
202076	2004 SV_{30}	—	September 17, 2004	Socorro	LINEAR	·	1.8 km	MPC · JPL
202077	2004 SS_{32}	—	September 17, 2004	Socorro	LINEAR	·	2.8 km	MPC · JPL
202078	2004 ST_{38}	—	September 17, 2004	Socorro	LINEAR	NYS	1.5 km	MPC · JPL
202079	2004 SR_{39}	—	September 17, 2004	Socorro	LINEAR	·	1.8 km	MPC · JPL
202080	2004 SR_{40}	—	September 17, 2004	Socorro	LINEAR	·	3.2 km	MPC · JPL
202081	2004 SA_{50}	—	September 22, 2004	Socorro	LINEAR	·	1.6 km	MPC · JPL
202082	2004 SQ_{51}	—	September 17, 2004	Socorro	LINEAR	·	1.3 km	MPC · JPL
202083	2004 ST_{53}	—	September 22, 2004	Socorro	LINEAR	·	2.1 km	MPC · JPL
202084	2004 SE_{56}	—	September 30, 2004	Wrightwood	J. W. Young	·	1.4 km	MPC · JPL
202085	2004 SZ_{60}	—	September 18, 2004	Socorro	LINEAR	·	1.8 km	MPC · JPL
202086	2004 TZ	—	October 3, 2004	Palomar	NEAT	·	1.8 km	MPC · JPL
202087	2004 TU_{1}	—	October 3, 2004	Palomar	NEAT	·	1.2 km	MPC · JPL
202088	2004 TB_{2}	—	October 4, 2004	Kitt Peak	Spacewatch	·	1.2 km	MPC · JPL
202089	2004 TP_{3}	—	October 4, 2004	Kitt Peak	Spacewatch	·	1.5 km	MPC · JPL
202090	2004 TN_{7}	—	October 5, 2004	Socorro	LINEAR	·	2.2 km	MPC · JPL
202091	2004 TF_{14}	—	October 9, 2004	Socorro	LINEAR	(5)	1.6 km	MPC · JPL
202092 Algirdas	2004 TD_{17}	Algirdas	October 11, 2004	Moletai	K. Černis	·	1.7 km	MPC · JPL
202093 Jogaila	2004 TP_{17}	Jogaila	October 11, 2004	Moletai	K. Černis, J. Zdanavicius	·	2.7 km	MPC · JPL
202094	2004 TM_{18}	—	October 12, 2004	Goodricke-Pigott	R. A. Tucker	ADE	4.9 km	MPC · JPL
202095	2004 TQ_{20}	—	October 5, 2004	Palomar	NEAT	(1338) (FLO)	930 m	MPC · JPL
202096	2004 TE_{26}	—	October 4, 2004	Kitt Peak	Spacewatch	·	1.2 km	MPC · JPL
202097	2004 TS_{28}	—	October 4, 2004	Kitt Peak	Spacewatch	MAS	940 m	MPC · JPL
202098	2004 TB_{29}	—	October 4, 2004	Kitt Peak	Spacewatch	NYS	1.4 km	MPC · JPL
202099	2004 TK_{29}	—	October 4, 2004	Kitt Peak	Spacewatch	·	1.7 km	MPC · JPL
202100	2004 TV_{34}	—	October 4, 2004	Anderson Mesa	LONEOS	·	2.6 km	MPC · JPL

== 202101–202200 ==
back to top

Designation			Discovery			Properties		Ref
Permanent	Provisional	Named after	Date	Site	Discoverer(s)	Category	Diam.	Ref
202101	2004 TA_{35}	—	October 4, 2004	Anderson Mesa	LONEOS	·	1.6 km	MPC · JPL
202102	2004 TB_{36}	—	October 4, 2004	Kitt Peak	Spacewatch	MAS	860 m	MPC · JPL
202103	2004 TK_{36}	—	October 4, 2004	Kitt Peak	Spacewatch	MAS	1.2 km	MPC · JPL
202104	2004 TV_{40}	—	October 4, 2004	Kitt Peak	Spacewatch	·	1.3 km	MPC · JPL
202105	2004 TJ_{41}	—	October 4, 2004	Anderson Mesa	LONEOS	·	1.8 km	MPC · JPL
202106	2004 TH_{42}	—	October 4, 2004	Kitt Peak	Spacewatch	(5)	1.6 km	MPC · JPL
202107	2004 TB_{49}	—	October 4, 2004	Kitt Peak	Spacewatch	MAS	1.0 km	MPC · JPL
202108	2004 TQ_{52}	—	October 4, 2004	Kitt Peak	Spacewatch	MAS	890 m	MPC · JPL
202109	2004 TZ_{53}	—	October 4, 2004	Kitt Peak	Spacewatch	NYS	1.8 km	MPC · JPL
202110	2004 TC_{55}	—	October 4, 2004	Kitt Peak	Spacewatch	·	2.0 km	MPC · JPL
202111	2004 TL_{59}	—	October 5, 2004	Kitt Peak	Spacewatch	NYS	1.4 km	MPC · JPL
202112	2004 TT_{72}	—	October 6, 2004	Kitt Peak	Spacewatch	MAS	1.0 km	MPC · JPL
202113	2004 TJ_{104}	—	October 7, 2004	Anderson Mesa	LONEOS	·	1.3 km	MPC · JPL
202114	2004 TM_{113}	—	October 7, 2004	Kitt Peak	Spacewatch	·	2.4 km	MPC · JPL
202115	2004 TZ_{115}	—	October 3, 2004	Palomar	NEAT	·	1.7 km	MPC · JPL
202116	2004 TC_{116}	—	October 3, 2004	Palomar	NEAT	·	1.8 km	MPC · JPL
202117	2004 TO_{116}	—	October 4, 2004	Anderson Mesa	LONEOS	·	1.8 km	MPC · JPL
202118	2004 TE_{118}	—	October 5, 2004	Anderson Mesa	LONEOS	·	1.9 km	MPC · JPL
202119	2004 TD_{121}	—	October 7, 2004	Anderson Mesa	LONEOS	·	2.4 km	MPC · JPL
202120	2004 TL_{121}	—	October 7, 2004	Anderson Mesa	LONEOS	·	1.2 km	MPC · JPL
202121	2004 TL_{124}	—	October 7, 2004	Socorro	LINEAR	·	1.7 km	MPC · JPL
202122	2004 TY_{127}	—	October 7, 2004	Socorro	LINEAR	·	2.2 km	MPC · JPL
202123	2004 TC_{131}	—	October 7, 2004	Anderson Mesa	LONEOS	NYS	2.3 km	MPC · JPL
202124	2004 TM_{146}	—	October 5, 2004	Kitt Peak	Spacewatch	PHO	950 m	MPC · JPL
202125	2004 TQ_{150}	—	October 6, 2004	Kitt Peak	Spacewatch	NYS	1.3 km	MPC · JPL
202126	2004 TZ_{161}	—	October 6, 2004	Kitt Peak	Spacewatch	·	1.6 km	MPC · JPL
202127	2004 TB_{169}	—	October 7, 2004	Socorro	LINEAR	NYS	2.0 km	MPC · JPL
202128	2004 TJ_{169}	—	October 7, 2004	Socorro	LINEAR	·	1.4 km	MPC · JPL
202129	2004 TM_{170}	—	October 7, 2004	Socorro	LINEAR	·	2.4 km	MPC · JPL
202130	2004 TF_{176}	—	October 9, 2004	Socorro	LINEAR	·	1.7 km	MPC · JPL
202131	2004 TO_{178}	—	October 7, 2004	Kitt Peak	Spacewatch	·	1.4 km	MPC · JPL
202132	2004 TP_{184}	—	October 7, 2004	Kitt Peak	Spacewatch	NYS	1.6 km	MPC · JPL
202133	2004 TU_{201}	—	October 7, 2004	Kitt Peak	Spacewatch	HOF	3.3 km	MPC · JPL
202134	2004 TX_{202}	—	October 7, 2004	Kitt Peak	Spacewatch	·	2.0 km	MPC · JPL
202135	2004 TH_{209}	—	October 8, 2004	Kitt Peak	Spacewatch	·	1.2 km	MPC · JPL
202136	2004 TA_{211}	—	October 8, 2004	Kitt Peak	Spacewatch	·	3.2 km	MPC · JPL
202137	2004 TH_{218}	—	October 5, 2004	Kitt Peak	Spacewatch	·	1.4 km	MPC · JPL
202138	2004 TE_{221}	—	October 7, 2004	Socorro	LINEAR	·	2.6 km	MPC · JPL
202139	2004 TF_{241}	—	October 10, 2004	Kitt Peak	Spacewatch	(5)	1.3 km	MPC · JPL
202140	2004 TM_{247}	—	October 7, 2004	Socorro	LINEAR	·	3.3 km	MPC · JPL
202141	2004 TX_{272}	—	October 9, 2004	Kitt Peak	Spacewatch	·	2.4 km	MPC · JPL
202142	2004 TA_{273}	—	October 9, 2004	Kitt Peak	Spacewatch	AGN	1.8 km	MPC · JPL
202143	2004 TC_{278}	—	October 9, 2004	Kitt Peak	Spacewatch	(5)	1.4 km	MPC · JPL
202144	2004 TU_{280}	—	October 10, 2004	Kitt Peak	Spacewatch	·	1.8 km	MPC · JPL
202145	2004 TR_{283}	—	October 8, 2004	Kitt Peak	Spacewatch	·	950 m	MPC · JPL
202146	2004 TO_{290}	—	October 10, 2004	Socorro	LINEAR	MAR	1.8 km	MPC · JPL
202147	2004 TC_{311}	—	October 10, 2004	Palomar	NEAT	·	2.1 km	MPC · JPL
202148	2004 TX_{317}	—	October 11, 2004	Kitt Peak	Spacewatch	·	1.7 km	MPC · JPL
202149	2004 TH_{324}	—	October 11, 2004	Kitt Peak	Spacewatch	·	2.0 km	MPC · JPL
202150	2004 TJ_{337}	—	October 12, 2004	Kitt Peak	Spacewatch	·	1.2 km	MPC · JPL
202151	2004 TL_{337}	—	October 12, 2004	Kitt Peak	Spacewatch	MAS	930 m	MPC · JPL
202152	2004 TP_{343}	—	October 14, 2004	Kitt Peak	Spacewatch	·	1.7 km	MPC · JPL
202153	2004 TT_{343}	—	October 14, 2004	Kitt Peak	Spacewatch	·	1.7 km	MPC · JPL
202154	2004 TB_{345}	—	October 15, 2004	Mount Lemmon	Mount Lemmon Survey	MAR	1.6 km	MPC · JPL
202155	2004 TX_{368}	—	October 7, 2004	Kitt Peak	Spacewatch	EUN	1.7 km	MPC · JPL
202156	2004 US_{7}	—	October 21, 2004	Socorro	LINEAR	·	2.4 km	MPC · JPL
202157	2004 VV_{2}	—	November 3, 2004	Kitt Peak	Spacewatch	·	1.7 km	MPC · JPL
202158	2004 VX_{5}	—	November 3, 2004	Kitt Peak	Spacewatch	MAS	1.0 km	MPC · JPL
202159	2004 VC_{7}	—	November 3, 2004	Kitt Peak	Spacewatch	·	2.1 km	MPC · JPL
202160	2004 VR_{15}	—	November 4, 2004	Kitt Peak	Spacewatch	·	1.8 km	MPC · JPL
202161	2004 VE_{22}	—	November 4, 2004	Catalina	CSS	·	1.8 km	MPC · JPL
202162	2004 VU_{25}	—	November 4, 2004	Catalina	CSS	·	1.3 km	MPC · JPL
202163	2004 VL_{29}	—	November 3, 2004	Kitt Peak	Spacewatch	·	1.5 km	MPC · JPL
202164	2004 VA_{41}	—	November 4, 2004	Kitt Peak	Spacewatch	·	1.7 km	MPC · JPL
202165	2004 VR_{43}	—	November 4, 2004	Kitt Peak	Spacewatch	·	3.0 km	MPC · JPL
202166	2004 VY_{48}	—	November 4, 2004	Kitt Peak	Spacewatch	(5)	2.2 km	MPC · JPL
202167	2004 VQ_{59}	—	November 9, 2004	Catalina	CSS	(5)	3.5 km	MPC · JPL
202168	2004 VA_{60}	—	November 9, 2004	Catalina	CSS	EUN	2.1 km	MPC · JPL
202169	2004 VD_{60}	—	November 9, 2004	Catalina	CSS	·	4.5 km	MPC · JPL
202170	2004 VE_{69}	—	November 10, 2004	Kitt Peak	Spacewatch	·	1.5 km	MPC · JPL
202171	2004 VE_{71}	—	November 7, 2004	Socorro	LINEAR	·	2.4 km	MPC · JPL
202172	2004 VH_{87}	—	November 11, 2004	Kitt Peak	Spacewatch	·	2.4 km	MPC · JPL
202173	2004 WA_{1}	—	November 18, 2004	Las Cruces	Dixon, D. S.	·	2.4 km	MPC · JPL
202174	2004 WB_{3}	—	November 17, 2004	Siding Spring	SSS	(5)	1.6 km	MPC · JPL
202175	2004 XQ_{3}	—	December 2, 2004	Socorro	LINEAR	PHO	2.0 km	MPC · JPL
202176	2004 XT_{4}	—	December 2, 2004	Catalina	CSS	·	3.6 km	MPC · JPL
202177	2004 XH_{5}	—	December 2, 2004	Catalina	CSS	·	2.5 km	MPC · JPL
202178	2004 XV_{7}	—	December 2, 2004	Palomar	NEAT	MAS	1.2 km	MPC · JPL
202179	2004 XU_{11}	—	December 7, 2004	Socorro	LINEAR	·	3.6 km	MPC · JPL
202180	2004 XW_{11}	—	December 7, 2004	Socorro	LINEAR	EUN	2.0 km	MPC · JPL
202181	2004 XE_{13}	—	December 8, 2004	Socorro	LINEAR	·	2.6 km	MPC · JPL
202182	2004 XV_{18}	—	December 8, 2004	Socorro	LINEAR	MAS	1.2 km	MPC · JPL
202183	2004 XE_{21}	—	December 8, 2004	Socorro	LINEAR	MAS	990 m	MPC · JPL
202184	2004 XC_{22}	—	December 8, 2004	Socorro	LINEAR	·	2.8 km	MPC · JPL
202185	2004 XN_{27}	—	December 10, 2004	Socorro	LINEAR	·	1.8 km	MPC · JPL
202186	2004 XM_{32}	—	December 10, 2004	Socorro	LINEAR	·	3.8 km	MPC · JPL
202187	2004 XS_{37}	—	December 10, 2004	Socorro	LINEAR	·	5.7 km	MPC · JPL
202188	2004 XZ_{40}	—	December 11, 2004	Socorro	LINEAR	EUN	1.9 km	MPC · JPL
202189	2004 XQ_{43}	—	December 11, 2004	Campo Imperatore	CINEOS	KOR	2.1 km	MPC · JPL
202190	2004 XZ_{46}	—	December 9, 2004	Kitt Peak	Spacewatch	·	2.5 km	MPC · JPL
202191	2004 XA_{48}	—	December 9, 2004	Kitt Peak	Spacewatch	·	2.0 km	MPC · JPL
202192	2004 XO_{50}	—	December 9, 2004	Catalina	CSS	·	4.4 km	MPC · JPL
202193	2004 XX_{56}	—	December 10, 2004	Socorro	LINEAR	·	1.9 km	MPC · JPL
202194	2004 XV_{57}	—	December 10, 2004	Kitt Peak	Spacewatch	·	2.2 km	MPC · JPL
202195	2004 XS_{64}	—	December 2, 2004	Socorro	LINEAR	·	2.8 km	MPC · JPL
202196	2004 XE_{71}	—	December 11, 2004	Haleakala	NEAT	526	4.6 km	MPC · JPL
202197	2004 XQ_{73}	—	December 11, 2004	Catalina	CSS	·	2.2 km	MPC · JPL
202198	2004 XW_{76}	—	December 10, 2004	Socorro	LINEAR	(10369)	3.3 km	MPC · JPL
202199	2004 XW_{77}	—	December 10, 2004	Socorro	LINEAR	EUN	2.0 km	MPC · JPL
202200	2004 XN_{81}	—	December 10, 2004	Socorro	LINEAR	NEM	4.3 km	MPC · JPL

== 202201–202300 ==
back to top

Designation			Discovery			Properties		Ref
Permanent	Provisional	Named after	Date	Site	Discoverer(s)	Category	Diam.	Ref
202201	2004 XC_{82}	—	December 11, 2004	Kitt Peak	Spacewatch	·	2.7 km	MPC · JPL
202202	2004 XB_{84}	—	December 11, 2004	Kitt Peak	Spacewatch	·	2.6 km	MPC · JPL
202203	2004 XK_{86}	—	December 13, 2004	Kitt Peak	Spacewatch	NYS	1.9 km	MPC · JPL
202204	2004 XK_{88}	—	December 10, 2004	Socorro	LINEAR	·	1.9 km	MPC · JPL
202205	2004 XB_{100}	—	December 12, 2004	Kitt Peak	Spacewatch	MAS	1.3 km	MPC · JPL
202206	2004 XJ_{101}	—	December 14, 2004	Socorro	LINEAR	EUN	2.5 km	MPC · JPL
202207	2004 XT_{101}	—	December 9, 2004	Socorro	LINEAR	·	2.0 km	MPC · JPL
202208	2004 XB_{103}	—	December 14, 2004	Anderson Mesa	LONEOS	·	2.2 km	MPC · JPL
202209	2004 XG_{103}	—	December 14, 2004	Catalina	CSS	·	3.4 km	MPC · JPL
202210	2004 XA_{105}	—	December 10, 2004	Socorro	LINEAR	·	3.1 km	MPC · JPL
202211	2004 XV_{106}	—	December 11, 2004	Socorro	LINEAR	·	2.1 km	MPC · JPL
202212	2004 XG_{109}	—	December 12, 2004	Kitt Peak	Spacewatch	·	2.3 km	MPC · JPL
202213	2004 XQ_{121}	—	December 15, 2004	Bergisch Gladbach	W. Bickel	·	1.8 km	MPC · JPL
202214	2004 XS_{122}	—	December 10, 2004	Kitt Peak	Spacewatch	·	1.6 km	MPC · JPL
202215	2004 XT_{122}	—	December 10, 2004	Kitt Peak	Spacewatch	·	1.8 km	MPC · JPL
202216	2004 XW_{124}	—	December 11, 2004	Socorro	LINEAR	·	2.0 km	MPC · JPL
202217	2004 XR_{125}	—	December 11, 2004	Catalina	CSS	·	2.4 km	MPC · JPL
202218	2004 XX_{128}	—	December 14, 2004	Socorro	LINEAR	·	2.3 km	MPC · JPL
202219	2004 XC_{134}	—	December 15, 2004	Socorro	LINEAR	·	4.2 km	MPC · JPL
202220	2004 XQ_{146}	—	December 14, 2004	Catalina	CSS	·	2.4 km	MPC · JPL
202221	2004 XY_{146}	—	December 15, 2004	Socorro	LINEAR	ADE	3.7 km	MPC · JPL
202222	2004 XG_{148}	—	December 14, 2004	Socorro	LINEAR	·	4.3 km	MPC · JPL
202223	2004 XV_{176}	—	December 11, 2004	Kitt Peak	Spacewatch	·	3.2 km	MPC · JPL
202224	2004 XQ_{180}	—	December 14, 2004	Socorro	LINEAR	·	1.8 km	MPC · JPL
202225	2004 XH_{191}	—	December 2, 2004	Catalina	CSS	·	2.5 km	MPC · JPL
202226	2004 XB_{192}	—	December 13, 2004	Kitt Peak	Spacewatch	·	4.6 km	MPC · JPL
202227	2004 YL_{1}	—	December 16, 2004	Uccle	T. Pauwels	·	2.1 km	MPC · JPL
202228	2004 YQ_{4}	—	December 17, 2004	Socorro	LINEAR	·	3.3 km	MPC · JPL
202229	2004 YR_{5}	—	December 19, 2004	Socorro	LINEAR	·	3.6 km	MPC · JPL
202230	2004 YG_{13}	—	December 18, 2004	Mount Lemmon	Mount Lemmon Survey	·	3.3 km	MPC · JPL
202231	2004 YM_{16}	—	December 18, 2004	Mount Lemmon	Mount Lemmon Survey	V	1.1 km	MPC · JPL
202232	2004 YV_{21}	—	December 18, 2004	Mount Lemmon	Mount Lemmon Survey	·	2.6 km	MPC · JPL
202233	2004 YA_{23}	—	December 18, 2004	Mount Lemmon	Mount Lemmon Survey	AGN	1.9 km	MPC · JPL
202234	2004 YQ_{26}	—	December 19, 2004	Mount Lemmon	Mount Lemmon Survey	·	2.4 km	MPC · JPL
202235	2004 YC_{29}	—	December 16, 2004	Kitt Peak	Spacewatch	NYS	1.5 km	MPC · JPL
202236	2004 YF_{31}	—	December 18, 2004	Socorro	LINEAR	·	5.6 km	MPC · JPL
202237	2004 YF_{35}	—	December 19, 2004	Catalina	CSS	·	2.3 km	MPC · JPL
202238	2005 AC_{2}	—	January 1, 2005	Catalina	CSS	·	1.4 km	MPC · JPL
202239	2005 AM_{6}	—	January 6, 2005	Socorro	LINEAR	·	3.4 km	MPC · JPL
202240	2005 AO_{6}	—	January 6, 2005	Socorro	LINEAR	·	2.1 km	MPC · JPL
202241	2005 AB_{7}	—	January 6, 2005	Catalina	CSS	·	4.5 km	MPC · JPL
202242	2005 AB_{11}	—	January 1, 2005	Catalina	CSS	·	2.2 km	MPC · JPL
202243	2005 AN_{13}	—	January 7, 2005	Socorro	LINEAR	·	1.7 km	MPC · JPL
202244	2005 AW_{13}	—	January 7, 2005	Socorro	LINEAR	fast	2.0 km	MPC · JPL
202245	2005 AZ_{13}	—	January 7, 2005	Socorro	LINEAR	·	1.7 km	MPC · JPL
202246	2005 AE_{14}	—	January 7, 2005	Catalina	CSS	·	2.4 km	MPC · JPL
202247	2005 AW_{15}	—	January 6, 2005	Socorro	LINEAR	·	3.0 km	MPC · JPL
202248	2005 AB_{16}	—	January 6, 2005	Socorro	LINEAR	·	4.4 km	MPC · JPL
202249	2005 AS_{16}	—	January 6, 2005	Socorro	LINEAR	·	2.1 km	MPC · JPL
202250	2005 AV_{17}	—	January 6, 2005	Socorro	LINEAR	·	3.0 km	MPC · JPL
202251	2005 AE_{21}	—	January 6, 2005	Catalina	CSS	·	2.0 km	MPC · JPL
202252	2005 AN_{22}	—	January 7, 2005	Socorro	LINEAR	(5)	1.9 km	MPC · JPL
202253	2005 AW_{25}	—	January 11, 2005	Socorro	LINEAR	·	2.1 km	MPC · JPL
202254	2005 AW_{26}	—	January 13, 2005	Catalina	CSS	·	4.9 km	MPC · JPL
202255	2005 AF_{30}	—	January 9, 2005	Catalina	CSS	·	3.4 km	MPC · JPL
202256	2005 AA_{31}	—	January 11, 2005	Socorro	LINEAR	·	2.0 km	MPC · JPL
202257	2005 AM_{32}	—	January 11, 2005	Socorro	LINEAR	·	2.3 km	MPC · JPL
202258	2005 AA_{39}	—	January 13, 2005	Kitt Peak	Spacewatch	·	2.2 km	MPC · JPL
202259	2005 AA_{40}	—	January 15, 2005	Catalina	CSS	EUN	2.1 km	MPC · JPL
202260	2005 AO_{43}	—	January 15, 2005	Catalina	CSS	·	3.1 km	MPC · JPL
202261	2005 AM_{54}	—	January 15, 2005	Kvistaberg	Uppsala-DLR Asteroid Survey	·	2.2 km	MPC · JPL
202262	2005 AO_{55}	—	January 15, 2005	Socorro	LINEAR	·	1.7 km	MPC · JPL
202263	2005 AK_{60}	—	January 15, 2005	Kitt Peak	Spacewatch	NEM	3.5 km	MPC · JPL
202264	2005 AB_{61}	—	January 15, 2005	Kitt Peak	Spacewatch	·	4.1 km	MPC · JPL
202265	2005 AY_{63}	—	January 13, 2005	Kitt Peak	Spacewatch	KOR	2.0 km	MPC · JPL
202266	2005 AH_{69}	—	January 15, 2005	Socorro	LINEAR	KOR	2.1 km	MPC · JPL
202267	2005 AZ_{69}	—	January 15, 2005	Kitt Peak	Spacewatch	·	2.3 km	MPC · JPL
202268	2005 AP_{71}	—	January 15, 2005	Kitt Peak	Spacewatch	·	1.8 km	MPC · JPL
202269	2005 AZ_{72}	—	January 15, 2005	Kitt Peak	Spacewatch	KOR	1.4 km	MPC · JPL
202270	2005 AV_{80}	—	January 15, 2005	Kitt Peak	Spacewatch	·	3.2 km	MPC · JPL
202271	2005 AK_{81}	—	January 7, 2005	Socorro	LINEAR	·	4.1 km	MPC · JPL
202272	2005 BA_{3}	—	January 16, 2005	Kitt Peak	Spacewatch	·	5.5 km	MPC · JPL
202273	2005 BO_{5}	—	January 16, 2005	Socorro	LINEAR	·	2.0 km	MPC · JPL
202274	2005 BA_{15}	—	January 16, 2005	Kitt Peak	Spacewatch	·	2.6 km	MPC · JPL
202275	2005 BA_{19}	—	January 16, 2005	Socorro	LINEAR	MRX	1.5 km	MPC · JPL
202276	2005 BO_{20}	—	January 16, 2005	Kitt Peak	Spacewatch	·	3.3 km	MPC · JPL
202277	2005 BH_{22}	—	January 16, 2005	Kitt Peak	Spacewatch	·	1.6 km	MPC · JPL
202278	2005 BT_{22}	—	January 16, 2005	Kitt Peak	Spacewatch	·	2.5 km	MPC · JPL
202279	2005 BT_{23}	—	January 17, 2005	Kitt Peak	Spacewatch	NEM	2.4 km	MPC · JPL
202280	2005 BC_{26}	—	January 18, 2005	Catalina	CSS	·	2.3 km	MPC · JPL
202281	2005 BF_{26}	—	January 18, 2005	Catalina	CSS	·	3.0 km	MPC · JPL
202282	2005 BJ_{26}	—	January 18, 2005	Catalina	CSS	slow	4.4 km	MPC · JPL
202283	2005 BL_{26}	—	January 18, 2005	Kitt Peak	Spacewatch	PAD ·	2.6 km	MPC · JPL
202284	2005 BA_{38}	—	January 16, 2005	Mauna Kea	Veillet, C.	·	3.0 km	MPC · JPL
202285	2005 BH_{44}	—	January 16, 2005	Mauna Kea	Veillet, C.	·	2.0 km	MPC · JPL
202286	2005 BM_{46}	—	January 16, 2005	Mauna Kea	Veillet, C.	·	2.7 km	MPC · JPL
202287	2005 BJ_{48}	—	January 18, 2005	Catalina	CSS	·	3.6 km	MPC · JPL
202288	2005 CR_{11}	—	February 1, 2005	Kitt Peak	Spacewatch	·	2.6 km	MPC · JPL
202289	2005 CA_{16}	—	February 2, 2005	Socorro	LINEAR	·	1.7 km	MPC · JPL
202290	2005 CT_{19}	—	February 2, 2005	Catalina	CSS	EUN	1.8 km	MPC · JPL
202291	2005 CV_{22}	—	February 1, 2005	Catalina	CSS	(5)	2.1 km	MPC · JPL
202292	2005 CY_{24}	—	February 4, 2005	Catalina	CSS	·	2.4 km	MPC · JPL
202293	2005 CQ_{27}	—	February 2, 2005	Catalina	CSS	·	2.2 km	MPC · JPL
202294	2005 CR_{28}	—	February 1, 2005	Kitt Peak	Spacewatch	·	2.1 km	MPC · JPL
202295	2005 CL_{40}	—	February 9, 2005	La Silla	A. Boattini, H. Scholl	·	2.0 km	MPC · JPL
202296	2005 CC_{41}	—	February 10, 2005	Powell	Fredrick, R., Trentman, R.	·	3.7 km	MPC · JPL
202297	2005 CH_{43}	—	February 2, 2005	Catalina	CSS	·	2.4 km	MPC · JPL
202298	2005 CG_{51}	—	February 2, 2005	Kitt Peak	Spacewatch	·	1.7 km	MPC · JPL
202299	2005 CR_{51}	—	February 2, 2005	Catalina	CSS	·	3.8 km	MPC · JPL
202300	2005 CL_{52}	—	February 3, 2005	Socorro	LINEAR	·	2.8 km	MPC · JPL

== 202301–202400 ==
back to top

Designation			Discovery			Properties		Ref
Permanent	Provisional	Named after	Date	Site	Discoverer(s)	Category	Diam.	Ref
202301	2005 CE_{53}	—	February 3, 2005	Socorro	LINEAR	·	2.6 km	MPC · JPL
202302	2005 CF_{61}	—	February 3, 2005	Calvin-Rehoboth	Calvin College	·	3.2 km	MPC · JPL
202303	2005 CM_{63}	—	February 9, 2005	Anderson Mesa	LONEOS	BRA	2.2 km	MPC · JPL
202304	2005 CV_{70}	—	February 1, 2005	Kitt Peak	Spacewatch	KOR	1.5 km	MPC · JPL
202305	2005 CX_{78}	—	February 2, 2005	Socorro	LINEAR	DOR	4.2 km	MPC · JPL
202306	2005 CQ_{79}	—	February 1, 2005	Kitt Peak	Spacewatch	·	4.7 km	MPC · JPL
202307	2005 DQ	—	February 28, 2005	Junk Bond	Junk Bond	·	5.7 km	MPC · JPL
202308	2005 DN_{3}	—	February 18, 2005	La Silla	A. Boattini, H. Scholl	·	2.9 km	MPC · JPL
202309	2005 ER_{4}	—	March 1, 2005	Kitt Peak	Spacewatch	·	4.4 km	MPC · JPL
202310	2005 ER_{11}	—	March 2, 2005	Catalina	CSS	·	2.4 km	MPC · JPL
202311	2005 EC_{12}	—	March 2, 2005	Catalina	CSS	·	3.3 km	MPC · JPL
202312	2005 EF_{12}	—	March 2, 2005	Catalina	CSS	·	5.7 km	MPC · JPL
202313	2005 EO_{13}	—	March 3, 2005	Kitt Peak	Spacewatch	·	4.4 km	MPC · JPL
202314	2005 EM_{18}	—	March 3, 2005	Catalina	CSS	HIL · 3:2	9.5 km	MPC · JPL
202315	2005 ED_{20}	—	March 3, 2005	Catalina	CSS	·	3.1 km	MPC · JPL
202316	2005 EZ_{28}	—	March 3, 2005	Catalina	CSS	EOS	3.7 km	MPC · JPL
202317	2005 ET_{31}	—	March 3, 2005	Kitt Peak	Spacewatch	·	3.1 km	MPC · JPL
202318	2005 ED_{32}	—	March 3, 2005	Catalina	CSS	THM	2.9 km	MPC · JPL
202319	2005 ED_{47}	—	March 3, 2005	Kitt Peak	Spacewatch	VER	4.2 km	MPC · JPL
202320	2005 EO_{49}	—	March 3, 2005	Catalina	CSS	·	3.0 km	MPC · JPL
202321	2005 EG_{55}	—	March 4, 2005	Kitt Peak	Spacewatch	EOS	2.5 km	MPC · JPL
202322	2005 EV_{58}	—	March 4, 2005	Kitt Peak	Spacewatch	·	4.1 km	MPC · JPL
202323	2005 EH_{61}	—	March 4, 2005	Catalina	CSS	·	3.2 km	MPC · JPL
202324	2005 EG_{68}	—	March 7, 2005	Socorro	LINEAR	·	4.4 km	MPC · JPL
202325	2005 EK_{74}	—	March 3, 2005	Catalina	CSS	MIS	3.6 km	MPC · JPL
202326	2005 ER_{74}	—	March 3, 2005	Catalina	CSS	·	2.4 km	MPC · JPL
202327	2005 ER_{75}	—	March 3, 2005	Kitt Peak	Spacewatch	·	3.1 km	MPC · JPL
202328	2005 EP_{76}	—	March 3, 2005	Kitt Peak	Spacewatch	HYG	3.6 km	MPC · JPL
202329	2005 EM_{80}	—	March 3, 2005	Kitt Peak	Spacewatch	·	3.8 km	MPC · JPL
202330	2005 EX_{85}	—	March 4, 2005	Socorro	LINEAR	·	1.7 km	MPC · JPL
202331	2005 EE_{91}	—	March 8, 2005	Kitt Peak	Spacewatch	·	4.3 km	MPC · JPL
202332	2005 ER_{91}	—	March 8, 2005	Kitt Peak	Spacewatch	·	2.7 km	MPC · JPL
202333	2005 EK_{93}	—	March 8, 2005	Socorro	LINEAR	·	2.9 km	MPC · JPL
202334	2005 EV_{96}	—	March 3, 2005	Catalina	CSS	·	2.8 km	MPC · JPL
202335	2005 EJ_{100}	—	March 3, 2005	Catalina	CSS	·	3.0 km	MPC · JPL
202336	2005 EN_{106}	—	March 4, 2005	Mount Lemmon	Mount Lemmon Survey	THM	3.8 km	MPC · JPL
202337	2005 EN_{108}	—	March 4, 2005	Catalina	CSS	·	4.8 km	MPC · JPL
202338	2005 EV_{110}	—	March 4, 2005	Mount Lemmon	Mount Lemmon Survey	·	2.4 km	MPC · JPL
202339	2005 EB_{112}	—	March 4, 2005	Socorro	LINEAR	ELF	5.6 km	MPC · JPL
202340	2005 EC_{119}	—	March 7, 2005	Socorro	LINEAR	EOS	3.4 km	MPC · JPL
202341	2005 EC_{122}	—	March 8, 2005	Mount Lemmon	Mount Lemmon Survey	AGN	1.6 km	MPC · JPL
202342	2005 ET_{126}	—	March 8, 2005	Mount Lemmon	Mount Lemmon Survey	·	3.6 km	MPC · JPL
202343	2005 EB_{132}	—	March 9, 2005	Catalina	CSS	EOS	2.7 km	MPC · JPL
202344	2005 EU_{136}	—	March 9, 2005	Mount Lemmon	Mount Lemmon Survey	·	1.9 km	MPC · JPL
202345	2005 EX_{144}	—	March 10, 2005	Mount Lemmon	Mount Lemmon Survey	·	2.6 km	MPC · JPL
202346	2005 EL_{153}	—	March 8, 2005	Catalina	CSS	·	5.7 km	MPC · JPL
202347	2005 EJ_{167}	—	March 11, 2005	Mount Lemmon	Mount Lemmon Survey	·	3.8 km	MPC · JPL
202348	2005 ER_{170}	—	March 7, 2005	Socorro	LINEAR	EUN	2.2 km	MPC · JPL
202349	2005 EK_{172}	—	March 8, 2005	Anderson Mesa	LONEOS	·	3.0 km	MPC · JPL
202350	2005 ER_{173}	—	March 8, 2005	Kitt Peak	Spacewatch	·	4.2 km	MPC · JPL
202351	2005 EQ_{174}	—	March 8, 2005	Kitt Peak	Spacewatch	·	3.3 km	MPC · JPL
202352	2005 ET_{181}	—	March 9, 2005	Socorro	LINEAR	·	3.0 km	MPC · JPL
202353	2005 EF_{189}	—	March 10, 2005	Siding Spring	SSS	·	6.7 km	MPC · JPL
202354	2005 EN_{194}	—	March 11, 2005	Mount Lemmon	Mount Lemmon Survey	·	4.7 km	MPC · JPL
202355	2005 ED_{201}	—	March 8, 2005	Catalina	CSS	·	2.3 km	MPC · JPL
202356	2005 EF_{214}	—	March 7, 2005	Goodricke-Pigott	R. A. Tucker	·	3.0 km	MPC · JPL
202357	2005 EV_{214}	—	March 8, 2005	Anderson Mesa	LONEOS	·	5.2 km	MPC · JPL
202358	2005 EL_{217}	—	March 9, 2005	Socorro	LINEAR	·	5.0 km	MPC · JPL
202359	2005 EH_{218}	—	March 9, 2005	Socorro	LINEAR	·	3.4 km	MPC · JPL
202360	2005 EM_{223}	—	March 11, 2005	Kitt Peak	Spacewatch	THM	3.6 km	MPC · JPL
202361	2005 EM_{226}	—	March 9, 2005	Catalina	CSS	·	5.0 km	MPC · JPL
202362	2005 EP_{242}	—	March 11, 2005	Catalina	CSS	·	4.5 km	MPC · JPL
202363	2005 EW_{246}	—	March 12, 2005	Kitt Peak	Spacewatch	·	2.6 km	MPC · JPL
202364	2005 EJ_{258}	—	March 11, 2005	Mount Lemmon	Mount Lemmon Survey	·	3.8 km	MPC · JPL
202365	2005 EB_{259}	—	March 11, 2005	Socorro	LINEAR	EOS	3.2 km	MPC · JPL
202366	2005 EX_{260}	—	March 12, 2005	Socorro	LINEAR	·	2.8 km	MPC · JPL
202367	2005 EU_{271}	—	March 3, 2005	Catalina	CSS	·	4.6 km	MPC · JPL
202368	2005 EQ_{275}	—	March 8, 2005	Socorro	LINEAR	HYG	6.1 km	MPC · JPL
202369	2005 EH_{276}	—	March 8, 2005	Mount Lemmon	Mount Lemmon Survey	·	3.3 km	MPC · JPL
202370	2005 EH_{279}	—	March 9, 2005	Socorro	LINEAR	·	5.7 km	MPC · JPL
202371	2005 EW_{279}	—	March 10, 2005	Catalina	CSS	·	5.2 km	MPC · JPL
202372	2005 ET_{290}	—	March 10, 2005	Mount Lemmon	Mount Lemmon Survey	·	4.7 km	MPC · JPL
202373 Ubuntu	2005 EW_{302}	Ubuntu	March 11, 2005	Kitt Peak	Gulbis, A.	·	2.6 km	MPC · JPL
202374	2005 EO_{323}	—	March 10, 2005	Catalina	CSS	·	2.5 km	MPC · JPL
202375	2005 FY_{12}	—	March 17, 2005	Mount Lemmon	Mount Lemmon Survey	ANF	2.2 km	MPC · JPL
202376	2005 GY_{13}	—	April 1, 2005	Anderson Mesa	LONEOS	·	6.3 km	MPC · JPL
202377	2005 GQ_{19}	—	April 2, 2005	Mount Lemmon	Mount Lemmon Survey	·	3.2 km	MPC · JPL
202378	2005 GT_{27}	—	April 3, 2005	Palomar	NEAT	·	2.5 km	MPC · JPL
202379	2005 GQ_{30}	—	April 4, 2005	Mount Lemmon	Mount Lemmon Survey	·	2.3 km	MPC · JPL
202380	2005 GS_{31}	—	April 4, 2005	Socorro	LINEAR	·	3.7 km	MPC · JPL
202381	2005 GG_{34}	—	April 1, 2005	Kitt Peak	Spacewatch	·	5.5 km	MPC · JPL
202382	2005 GJ_{45}	—	April 5, 2005	Palomar	NEAT	·	6.1 km	MPC · JPL
202383	2005 GA_{56}	—	April 6, 2005	Mount Lemmon	Mount Lemmon Survey	·	3.1 km	MPC · JPL
202384	2005 GU_{59}	—	April 2, 2005	Mount Lemmon	Mount Lemmon Survey	THM	3.0 km	MPC · JPL
202385	2005 GY_{63}	—	April 2, 2005	Catalina	CSS	VER	5.0 km	MPC · JPL
202386	2005 GR_{64}	—	April 2, 2005	Kitt Peak	Spacewatch	·	2.4 km	MPC · JPL
202387	2005 GR_{74}	—	April 5, 2005	Mount Lemmon	Mount Lemmon Survey	·	3.7 km	MPC · JPL
202388	2005 GL_{75}	—	April 5, 2005	Mount Lemmon	Mount Lemmon Survey	·	3.0 km	MPC · JPL
202389	2005 GJ_{85}	—	April 4, 2005	Catalina	CSS	·	3.4 km	MPC · JPL
202390	2005 GA_{86}	—	April 4, 2005	Catalina	CSS	·	3.8 km	MPC · JPL
202391	2005 GT_{132}	—	April 10, 2005	Kitt Peak	Spacewatch	·	4.4 km	MPC · JPL
202392	2005 GG_{138}	—	April 12, 2005	Kitt Peak	Spacewatch	·	4.4 km	MPC · JPL
202393	2005 GW_{160}	—	April 13, 2005	Anderson Mesa	LONEOS	·	2.4 km	MPC · JPL
202394	2005 GM_{175}	—	April 14, 2005	Kitt Peak	Spacewatch	·	5.4 km	MPC · JPL
202395	2005 GR_{181}	—	April 12, 2005	Kitt Peak	Spacewatch	·	4.4 km	MPC · JPL
202396	2005 HD_{6}	—	April 30, 2005	Kitt Peak	Spacewatch	·	5.3 km	MPC · JPL
202397	2005 JS_{18}	—	May 4, 2005	Mount Lemmon	Mount Lemmon Survey	THM	2.9 km	MPC · JPL
202398	2005 JV_{18}	—	May 4, 2005	Mount Lemmon	Mount Lemmon Survey	·	780 m	MPC · JPL
202399	2005 JS_{30}	—	May 4, 2005	Kitt Peak	Spacewatch	MIS	3.7 km	MPC · JPL
202400	2005 JC_{37}	—	May 4, 2005	Siding Spring	SSS	·	6.9 km	MPC · JPL

== 202401–202500 ==
back to top

Designation			Discovery			Properties		Ref
Permanent	Provisional	Named after	Date	Site	Discoverer(s)	Category	Diam.	Ref
202401	2005 JR_{69}	—	May 7, 2005	Kitt Peak	Spacewatch	·	6.4 km	MPC · JPL
202402	2005 JO_{108}	—	May 10, 2005	Bergisch Gladbach	W. Bickel	EOS	3.3 km	MPC · JPL
202403	2005 JB_{146}	—	May 13, 2005	Mount Lemmon	Mount Lemmon Survey	NYS	1.6 km	MPC · JPL
202404	2005 KB_{1}	—	May 16, 2005	Kitt Peak	Spacewatch	LIX	4.4 km	MPC · JPL
202405	2005 LX_{6}	—	June 1, 2005	Kitt Peak	Spacewatch	·	4.0 km	MPC · JPL
202406	2005 LO_{14}	—	June 5, 2005	Kitt Peak	Spacewatch	EOS	2.5 km	MPC · JPL
202407	2005 LB_{23}	—	June 8, 2005	Kitt Peak	Spacewatch	·	2.3 km	MPC · JPL
202408	2005 LY_{45}	—	June 13, 2005	Kitt Peak	Spacewatch	·	7.3 km	MPC · JPL
202409	2005 MA_{2}	—	June 24, 2005	Palomar	NEAT	H	1.0 km	MPC · JPL
202410	2005 NP_{56}	—	July 5, 2005	Kitt Peak	Spacewatch	·	1.4 km	MPC · JPL
202411	2005 RC	—	September 1, 2005	Socorro	LINEAR	APO +1km	990 m	MPC · JPL
202412	2005 SQ_{210}	—	September 30, 2005	Palomar	NEAT	·	990 m	MPC · JPL
202413	2005 TZ_{183}	—	October 1, 2005	Mount Lemmon	Mount Lemmon Survey	·	1.3 km	MPC · JPL
202414	2005 UV_{19}	—	October 22, 2005	Kitt Peak	Spacewatch	·	970 m	MPC · JPL
202415	2005 UJ_{24}	—	October 23, 2005	Kitt Peak	Spacewatch	·	2.4 km	MPC · JPL
202416	2005 UK_{95}	—	October 22, 2005	Kitt Peak	Spacewatch	·	960 m	MPC · JPL
202417	2005 UN_{175}	—	October 24, 2005	Kitt Peak	Spacewatch	·	1.0 km	MPC · JPL
202418	2005 UV_{179}	—	October 24, 2005	Kitt Peak	Spacewatch	·	780 m	MPC · JPL
202419	2005 UP_{251}	—	October 23, 2005	Catalina	CSS	·	1.0 km	MPC · JPL
202420	2005 UO_{506}	—	October 24, 2005	Mauna Kea	D. J. Tholen	·	1.8 km	MPC · JPL
202421	2005 UQ_{513}	—	October 21, 2005	Palomar	Palomar	cubewano (hot)	498 km	MPC · JPL
202422	2005 VU_{52}	—	November 3, 2005	Mount Lemmon	Mount Lemmon Survey	·	1.2 km	MPC · JPL
202423	2005 VV_{118}	—	November 3, 2005	Socorro	LINEAR	H	990 m	MPC · JPL
202424	2005 WX_{63}	—	November 25, 2005	Mount Lemmon	Mount Lemmon Survey	·	1 km	MPC · JPL
202425	2005 WH_{112}	—	November 30, 2005	Socorro	LINEAR	·	1.1 km	MPC · JPL
202426	2005 WP_{151}	—	November 28, 2005	Kitt Peak	Spacewatch	·	1.0 km	MPC · JPL
202427	2005 WQ_{167}	—	November 30, 2005	Kitt Peak	Spacewatch	·	970 m	MPC · JPL
202428	2005 WT_{175}	—	November 30, 2005	Kitt Peak	Spacewatch	·	1.3 km	MPC · JPL
202429	2005 WD_{176}	—	November 30, 2005	Kitt Peak	Spacewatch	·	820 m	MPC · JPL
202430	2005 WS_{183}	—	November 28, 2005	Catalina	CSS	·	1.5 km	MPC · JPL
202431	2005 WM_{186}	—	November 29, 2005	Mount Lemmon	Mount Lemmon Survey	·	790 m	MPC · JPL
202432	2005 WH_{193}	—	November 28, 2005	Catalina	CSS	H	1.1 km	MPC · JPL
202433	2005 WR_{207}	—	November 25, 2005	Mount Lemmon	Mount Lemmon Survey	MAS	880 m	MPC · JPL
202434	2005 XM_{2}	—	December 1, 2005	Mount Lemmon	Mount Lemmon Survey	·	950 m	MPC · JPL
202435	2005 XH_{8}	—	December 1, 2005	Palomar	NEAT	APO +1km	870 m	MPC · JPL
202436	2005 XU_{15}	—	December 1, 2005	Mount Lemmon	Mount Lemmon Survey	·	910 m	MPC · JPL
202437	2005 XF_{53}	—	December 4, 2005	Kitt Peak	Spacewatch	·	1.5 km	MPC · JPL
202438	2005 XU_{79}	—	December 5, 2005	Kitt Peak	Spacewatch	·	1.4 km	MPC · JPL
202439	2005 XC_{82}	—	December 8, 2005	Kitt Peak	Spacewatch	·	770 m	MPC · JPL
202440	2005 YG_{16}	—	December 22, 2005	Kitt Peak	Spacewatch	·	1.0 km	MPC · JPL
202441	2005 YZ_{29}	—	December 25, 2005	Kitt Peak	Spacewatch	·	2.7 km	MPC · JPL
202442	2005 YM_{45}	—	December 25, 2005	Kitt Peak	Spacewatch	·	2.4 km	MPC · JPL
202443	2005 YE_{58}	—	December 24, 2005	Kitt Peak	Spacewatch	·	980 m	MPC · JPL
202444	2005 YM_{64}	—	December 24, 2005	Kitt Peak	Spacewatch	·	1.1 km	MPC · JPL
202445	2005 YN_{82}	—	December 24, 2005	Kitt Peak	Spacewatch	·	1.5 km	MPC · JPL
202446	2005 YQ_{91}	—	December 26, 2005	Mount Lemmon	Mount Lemmon Survey	·	1.4 km	MPC · JPL
202447	2005 YZ_{98}	—	December 28, 2005	Kitt Peak	Spacewatch	(2076)	1.7 km	MPC · JPL
202448	2005 YJ_{108}	—	December 25, 2005	Kitt Peak	Spacewatch	·	1.5 km	MPC · JPL
202449	2005 YP_{116}	—	December 25, 2005	Kitt Peak	Spacewatch	·	850 m	MPC · JPL
202450	2005 YR_{126}	—	December 26, 2005	Kitt Peak	Spacewatch	·	1.4 km	MPC · JPL
202451	2005 YU_{139}	—	December 28, 2005	Catalina	CSS	·	1.1 km	MPC · JPL
202452	2005 YA_{152}	—	December 26, 2005	Mount Lemmon	Mount Lemmon Survey	·	590 m	MPC · JPL
202453	2005 YE_{155}	—	December 29, 2005	Kitt Peak	Spacewatch	·	1.1 km	MPC · JPL
202454	2005 YX_{173}	—	December 25, 2005	Catalina	CSS	·	1.2 km	MPC · JPL
202455	2005 YF_{192}	—	December 30, 2005	Kitt Peak	Spacewatch	·	1.1 km	MPC · JPL
202456	2005 YW_{192}	—	December 30, 2005	Kitt Peak	Spacewatch	·	2.3 km	MPC · JPL
202457	2005 YO_{202}	—	December 25, 2005	Kitt Peak	Spacewatch	·	1.4 km	MPC · JPL
202458	2005 YU_{266}	—	December 25, 2005	Kitt Peak	Spacewatch	NYS	1.8 km	MPC · JPL
202459	2005 YC_{271}	—	December 28, 2005	Mount Lemmon	Mount Lemmon Survey	·	2.0 km	MPC · JPL
202460	2005 YG_{280}	—	December 25, 2005	Mount Lemmon	Mount Lemmon Survey	·	1.2 km	MPC · JPL
202461	2005 YY_{286}	—	December 25, 2005	Catalina	CSS	·	1.3 km	MPC · JPL
202462	2006 AP_{13}	—	January 5, 2006	Mount Lemmon	Mount Lemmon Survey	PHO	1.2 km	MPC · JPL
202463	2006 AZ_{13}	—	January 5, 2006	Mount Lemmon	Mount Lemmon Survey	MAS	1.3 km	MPC · JPL
202464	2006 AT_{15}	—	January 2, 2006	Mount Lemmon	Mount Lemmon Survey	·	1.1 km	MPC · JPL
202465	2006 AR_{18}	—	January 5, 2006	Kitt Peak	Spacewatch	·	730 m	MPC · JPL
202466	2006 AP_{20}	—	January 5, 2006	Catalina	CSS	(2076)	970 m	MPC · JPL
202467	2006 AP_{23}	—	January 4, 2006	Kitt Peak	Spacewatch	NYS	1.7 km	MPC · JPL
202468	2006 AT_{27}	—	January 5, 2006	Kitt Peak	Spacewatch	NYS ·	1.9 km	MPC · JPL
202469	2006 AQ_{30}	—	January 4, 2006	Kitt Peak	Spacewatch	·	980 m	MPC · JPL
202470	2006 AS_{31}	—	January 5, 2006	Catalina	CSS	·	1.2 km	MPC · JPL
202471	2006 AQ_{38}	—	January 7, 2006	Kitt Peak	Spacewatch	MAS	840 m	MPC · JPL
202472	2006 AL_{42}	—	January 6, 2006	Mount Lemmon	Mount Lemmon Survey	·	680 m	MPC · JPL
202473	2006 AQ_{55}	—	January 6, 2006	Kitt Peak	Spacewatch	·	1.3 km	MPC · JPL
202474	2006 AO_{70}	—	January 6, 2006	Kitt Peak	Spacewatch	·	1.4 km	MPC · JPL
202475	2006 AZ_{70}	—	January 6, 2006	Kitt Peak	Spacewatch	·	1.7 km	MPC · JPL
202476	2006 AM_{73}	—	January 8, 2006	Mount Lemmon	Mount Lemmon Survey	·	1.2 km	MPC · JPL
202477	2006 AX_{93}	—	January 7, 2006	Mount Lemmon	Mount Lemmon Survey	·	5.7 km	MPC · JPL
202478	2006 BD_{2}	—	January 20, 2006	Kitt Peak	Spacewatch	·	910 m	MPC · JPL
202479	2006 BH_{4}	—	January 21, 2006	Kitt Peak	Spacewatch	MAS	920 m	MPC · JPL
202480	2006 BR_{5}	—	January 21, 2006	Mount Lemmon	Mount Lemmon Survey	NYS	1.4 km	MPC · JPL
202481	2006 BR_{6}	—	January 20, 2006	Kitt Peak	Spacewatch	·	2.3 km	MPC · JPL
202482	2006 BG_{11}	—	January 20, 2006	Kitt Peak	Spacewatch	·	2.2 km	MPC · JPL
202483	2006 BN_{25}	—	January 23, 2006	Mount Lemmon	Mount Lemmon Survey	·	980 m	MPC · JPL
202484	2006 BQ_{33}	—	January 21, 2006	Kitt Peak	Spacewatch	·	2.3 km	MPC · JPL
202485	2006 BQ_{40}	—	January 21, 2006	Kitt Peak	Spacewatch	·	3.0 km	MPC · JPL
202486	2006 BU_{46}	—	January 23, 2006	Mount Lemmon	Mount Lemmon Survey	·	1.5 km	MPC · JPL
202487	2006 BF_{50}	—	January 25, 2006	Kitt Peak	Spacewatch	·	1.9 km	MPC · JPL
202488	2006 BK_{50}	—	January 25, 2006	Kitt Peak	Spacewatch	V	830 m	MPC · JPL
202489	2006 BQ_{51}	—	January 25, 2006	Kitt Peak	Spacewatch	NYS	2.1 km	MPC · JPL
202490	2006 BL_{60}	—	January 26, 2006	Kitt Peak	Spacewatch	(5)	2.3 km	MPC · JPL
202491	2006 BC_{62}	—	January 22, 2006	Catalina	CSS	·	910 m	MPC · JPL
202492	2006 BG_{65}	—	January 22, 2006	Mount Lemmon	Mount Lemmon Survey	·	680 m	MPC · JPL
202493	2006 BV_{70}	—	January 23, 2006	Kitt Peak	Spacewatch	·	2.0 km	MPC · JPL
202494	2006 BD_{85}	—	January 25, 2006	Kitt Peak	Spacewatch	MAS	1.1 km	MPC · JPL
202495	2006 BB_{86}	—	January 25, 2006	Kitt Peak	Spacewatch	·	850 m	MPC · JPL
202496	2006 BW_{91}	—	January 26, 2006	Kitt Peak	Spacewatch	·	3.2 km	MPC · JPL
202497	2006 BE_{125}	—	January 26, 2006	Kitt Peak	Spacewatch	·	1.5 km	MPC · JPL
202498	2006 BX_{132}	—	January 26, 2006	Kitt Peak	Spacewatch	KOR	1.9 km	MPC · JPL
202499	2006 BS_{135}	—	January 27, 2006	Mount Lemmon	Mount Lemmon Survey	NYS	1.6 km	MPC · JPL
202500	2006 BA_{140}	—	January 21, 2006	Kitt Peak	Spacewatch	·	810 m	MPC · JPL

== 202501–202600 ==
back to top

Designation			Discovery			Properties		Ref
Permanent	Provisional	Named after	Date	Site	Discoverer(s)	Category	Diam.	Ref
202501	2006 BS_{145}	—	January 23, 2006	Catalina	CSS	JUN	2.3 km	MPC · JPL
202502	2006 BK_{146}	—	January 24, 2006	Kitt Peak	Spacewatch	·	1.7 km	MPC · JPL
202503	2006 BZ_{146}	—	January 30, 2006	7300	W. K. Y. Yeung	·	1.4 km	MPC · JPL
202504	2006 BK_{148}	—	January 21, 2006	Palomar	NEAT	·	2.3 km	MPC · JPL
202505 Farhang	2006 BK_{149}	Farhang	January 23, 2006	Catalina	CSS	(2076)	1.2 km	MPC · JPL
202506	2006 BZ_{155}	—	January 25, 2006	Kitt Peak	Spacewatch	·	1.7 km	MPC · JPL
202507	2006 BW_{164}	—	January 26, 2006	Kitt Peak	Spacewatch	·	1.6 km	MPC · JPL
202508	2006 BH_{165}	—	January 26, 2006	Kitt Peak	Spacewatch	·	1.3 km	MPC · JPL
202509	2006 BG_{166}	—	January 26, 2006	Mount Lemmon	Mount Lemmon Survey	·	1.7 km	MPC · JPL
202510	2006 BZ_{169}	—	January 26, 2006	Mount Lemmon	Mount Lemmon Survey	·	2.1 km	MPC · JPL
202511	2006 BR_{176}	—	January 27, 2006	Kitt Peak	Spacewatch	·	2.1 km	MPC · JPL
202512	2006 BR_{178}	—	January 27, 2006	Mount Lemmon	Mount Lemmon Survey	NYS	1.4 km	MPC · JPL
202513	2006 BX_{184}	—	January 28, 2006	Mount Lemmon	Mount Lemmon Survey	·	1.5 km	MPC · JPL
202514	2006 BE_{199}	—	January 30, 2006	Kitt Peak	Spacewatch	NYS	2.7 km	MPC · JPL
202515	2006 BB_{200}	—	January 30, 2006	Kitt Peak	Spacewatch	·	1.9 km	MPC · JPL
202516	2006 BN_{205}	—	January 31, 2006	Kitt Peak	Spacewatch	MAS	820 m	MPC · JPL
202517	2006 BW_{246}	—	January 31, 2006	Kitt Peak	Spacewatch	MAS	850 m	MPC · JPL
202518	2006 BG_{253}	—	January 31, 2006	Kitt Peak	Spacewatch	NYS	1.6 km	MPC · JPL
202519	2006 BA_{260}	—	January 31, 2006	Mount Lemmon	Mount Lemmon Survey	NYS	1.5 km	MPC · JPL
202520	2006 BL_{270}	—	January 31, 2006	Catalina	CSS	EUN	1.8 km	MPC · JPL
202521	2006 BP_{274}	—	January 31, 2006	Kitt Peak	Spacewatch	·	990 m	MPC · JPL
202522	2006 CO_{41}	—	February 2, 2006	Kitt Peak	Spacewatch	·	3.2 km	MPC · JPL
202523	2006 DZ_{2}	—	February 20, 2006	Kitt Peak	Spacewatch	·	1.1 km	MPC · JPL
202524	2006 DJ_{4}	—	February 20, 2006	Socorro	LINEAR	·	840 m	MPC · JPL
202525	2006 DP_{6}	—	February 20, 2006	Kitt Peak	Spacewatch	·	2.7 km	MPC · JPL
202526	2006 DO_{8}	—	February 21, 2006	Mount Lemmon	Mount Lemmon Survey	·	2.1 km	MPC · JPL
202527	2006 DP_{8}	—	February 21, 2006	Mount Lemmon	Mount Lemmon Survey	·	1.6 km	MPC · JPL
202528	2006 DW_{8}	—	February 21, 2006	Catalina	CSS	·	1.2 km	MPC · JPL
202529	2006 DP_{10}	—	February 20, 2006	Mount Lemmon	Mount Lemmon Survey	·	680 m	MPC · JPL
202530	2006 DZ_{16}	—	February 20, 2006	Kitt Peak	Spacewatch	·	3.5 km	MPC · JPL
202531	2006 DG_{19}	—	February 20, 2006	Kitt Peak	Spacewatch	·	1.9 km	MPC · JPL
202532	2006 DS_{26}	—	February 20, 2006	Kitt Peak	Spacewatch	·	2.9 km	MPC · JPL
202533	2006 DY_{32}	—	February 20, 2006	Kitt Peak	Spacewatch	fast?	1.5 km	MPC · JPL
202534	2006 DB_{37}	—	February 20, 2006	Kitt Peak	Spacewatch	(12739)	2.6 km	MPC · JPL
202535	2006 DX_{43}	—	February 20, 2006	Catalina	CSS	·	1.5 km	MPC · JPL
202536	2006 DT_{51}	—	February 24, 2006	Kitt Peak	Spacewatch	·	2.8 km	MPC · JPL
202537	2006 DO_{60}	—	February 24, 2006	Kitt Peak	Spacewatch	KOR	2.0 km	MPC · JPL
202538	2006 DM_{61}	—	February 24, 2006	Mount Lemmon	Mount Lemmon Survey	·	2.7 km	MPC · JPL
202539	2006 DJ_{62}	—	February 24, 2006	Catalina	CSS	·	2.1 km	MPC · JPL
202540	2006 DK_{62}	—	February 24, 2006	Socorro	LINEAR	NYS ·	3.1 km	MPC · JPL
202541	2006 DA_{78}	—	February 24, 2006	Kitt Peak	Spacewatch	·	1.3 km	MPC · JPL
202542	2006 DN_{92}	—	February 24, 2006	Kitt Peak	Spacewatch	·	2.1 km	MPC · JPL
202543	2006 DB_{94}	—	February 24, 2006	Kitt Peak	Spacewatch	·	2.4 km	MPC · JPL
202544	2006 DQ_{115}	—	February 27, 2006	Kitt Peak	Spacewatch	·	2.2 km	MPC · JPL
202545	2006 DC_{124}	—	February 24, 2006	Mount Lemmon	Mount Lemmon Survey	·	1.5 km	MPC · JPL
202546	2006 DW_{127}	—	February 25, 2006	Mount Lemmon	Mount Lemmon Survey	(5)	1.9 km	MPC · JPL
202547	2006 DP_{149}	—	February 25, 2006	Kitt Peak	Spacewatch	·	4.0 km	MPC · JPL
202548	2006 DW_{155}	—	February 26, 2006	Kitt Peak	Spacewatch	·	3.6 km	MPC · JPL
202549	2006 DO_{172}	—	February 27, 2006	Kitt Peak	Spacewatch	·	1.2 km	MPC · JPL
202550	2006 DJ_{175}	—	February 27, 2006	Socorro	LINEAR	V	890 m	MPC · JPL
202551	2006 DX_{188}	—	February 27, 2006	Kitt Peak	Spacewatch	3:2	8.3 km	MPC · JPL
202552	2006 DB_{196}	—	February 21, 2006	Catalina	CSS	·	1.3 km	MPC · JPL
202553	2006 DY_{197}	—	February 25, 2006	Mount Lemmon	Mount Lemmon Survey	·	1.3 km	MPC · JPL
202554	2006 DV_{198}	—	February 27, 2006	Catalina	CSS	MAR	1.4 km	MPC · JPL
202555	2006 DV_{203}	—	February 23, 2006	Anderson Mesa	LONEOS	·	2.0 km	MPC · JPL
202556	2006 DQ_{210}	—	February 22, 2006	Anderson Mesa	LONEOS	·	1.5 km	MPC · JPL
202557	2006 DY_{210}	—	February 24, 2006	Palomar	NEAT	·	1.8 km	MPC · JPL
202558	2006 DZ_{214}	—	February 25, 2006	Kitt Peak	Spacewatch	·	2.4 km	MPC · JPL
202559	2006 DL_{216}	—	February 20, 2006	Mount Lemmon	Mount Lemmon Survey	EOS	2.5 km	MPC · JPL
202560	2006 EQ_{7}	—	March 2, 2006	Kitt Peak	Spacewatch	EOS	2.1 km	MPC · JPL
202561	2006 EU_{9}	—	March 2, 2006	Kitt Peak	Spacewatch	·	1.5 km	MPC · JPL
202562	2006 EG_{17}	—	March 2, 2006	Kitt Peak	Spacewatch	·	5.0 km	MPC · JPL
202563	2006 ER_{17}	—	March 2, 2006	Kitt Peak	Spacewatch	EOS	2.7 km	MPC · JPL
202564	2006 EP_{20}	—	March 3, 2006	Kitt Peak	Spacewatch	·	1.5 km	MPC · JPL
202565	2006 EO_{23}	—	March 3, 2006	Kitt Peak	Spacewatch	·	1.8 km	MPC · JPL
202566	2006 EQ_{28}	—	March 3, 2006	Kitt Peak	Spacewatch	·	1.7 km	MPC · JPL
202567	2006 EA_{41}	—	March 4, 2006	Kitt Peak	Spacewatch	HYG	2.6 km	MPC · JPL
202568	2006 EL_{48}	—	March 4, 2006	Kitt Peak	Spacewatch	·	1.9 km	MPC · JPL
202569	2006 EX_{50}	—	March 4, 2006	Mount Lemmon	Mount Lemmon Survey	·	1.8 km	MPC · JPL
202570	2006 ED_{58}	—	March 5, 2006	Kitt Peak	Spacewatch	(5)	2.0 km	MPC · JPL
202571	2006 EX_{71}	—	March 2, 2006	Kitt Peak	Spacewatch	·	1.2 km	MPC · JPL
202572	2006 FP_{11}	—	March 23, 2006	Kitt Peak	Spacewatch	KOR	2.5 km	MPC · JPL
202573	2006 FY_{13}	—	March 23, 2006	Kitt Peak	Spacewatch	·	2.6 km	MPC · JPL
202574	2006 FD_{14}	—	March 23, 2006	Kitt Peak	Spacewatch	PAD	3.4 km	MPC · JPL
202575	2006 FM_{14}	—	March 23, 2006	Kitt Peak	Spacewatch	·	4.2 km	MPC · JPL
202576	2006 FC_{17}	—	March 23, 2006	Mount Lemmon	Mount Lemmon Survey	·	2.9 km	MPC · JPL
202577	2006 FE_{17}	—	March 23, 2006	Mount Lemmon	Mount Lemmon Survey	·	2.8 km	MPC · JPL
202578	2006 FZ_{22}	—	March 24, 2006	Kitt Peak	Spacewatch	·	1.9 km	MPC · JPL
202579	2006 FE_{23}	—	March 24, 2006	Kitt Peak	Spacewatch	·	2.5 km	MPC · JPL
202580	2006 FD_{27}	—	March 24, 2006	Mount Lemmon	Mount Lemmon Survey	·	1.7 km	MPC · JPL
202581	2006 FP_{31}	—	March 25, 2006	Kitt Peak	Spacewatch	THM	3.0 km	MPC · JPL
202582	2006 FW_{36}	—	March 23, 2006	Catalina	CSS	(194)	2.6 km	MPC · JPL
202583	2006 FA_{40}	—	March 25, 2006	Kitt Peak	Spacewatch	·	1.9 km	MPC · JPL
202584	2006 GO_{3}	—	April 7, 2006	Junk Bond	D. Healy	·	2.5 km	MPC · JPL
202585	2006 GV_{16}	—	April 2, 2006	Kitt Peak	Spacewatch	NYS	1.4 km	MPC · JPL
202586	2006 GP_{25}	—	April 2, 2006	Kitt Peak	Spacewatch	AST	3.4 km	MPC · JPL
202587	2006 GN_{31}	—	April 2, 2006	Kitt Peak	Spacewatch	·	4.7 km	MPC · JPL
202588	2006 GM_{36}	—	April 8, 2006	Kitt Peak	Spacewatch	·	2.3 km	MPC · JPL
202589	2006 GO_{37}	—	April 6, 2006	Siding Spring	SSS	EUN	1.8 km	MPC · JPL
202590	2006 GT_{38}	—	April 6, 2006	Socorro	LINEAR	·	1.7 km	MPC · JPL
202591	2006 GU_{47}	—	April 9, 2006	Kitt Peak	Spacewatch	·	2.5 km	MPC · JPL
202592	2006 GM_{48}	—	April 9, 2006	Anderson Mesa	LONEOS	·	2.3 km	MPC · JPL
202593	2006 GT_{52}	—	April 7, 2006	Catalina	CSS	·	2.2 km	MPC · JPL
202594	2006 GY_{54}	—	April 2, 2006	Kitt Peak	Spacewatch	·	2.0 km	MPC · JPL
202595	2006 HY_{4}	—	April 19, 2006	Mount Lemmon	Mount Lemmon Survey	KOR	1.8 km	MPC · JPL
202596	2006 HQ_{16}	—	April 18, 2006	Kitt Peak	Spacewatch	·	2.8 km	MPC · JPL
202597	2006 HD_{17}	—	April 21, 2006	Palomar	NEAT	EUN	2.3 km	MPC · JPL
202598	2006 HP_{17}	—	April 18, 2006	Catalina	CSS	TIR	4.5 km	MPC · JPL
202599 Harkányi	2006 HS_{18}	Harkányi	April 24, 2006	Piszkéstető	K. Sárneczky	·	1.4 km	MPC · JPL
202600	2006 HT_{20}	—	April 19, 2006	Mount Lemmon	Mount Lemmon Survey	MRX	1.2 km	MPC · JPL

== 202601–202700 ==
back to top

Designation			Discovery			Properties		Ref
Permanent	Provisional	Named after	Date	Site	Discoverer(s)	Category	Diam.	Ref
202601	2006 HG_{21}	—	April 20, 2006	Kitt Peak	Spacewatch	HOF	3.9 km	MPC · JPL
202602	2006 HL_{23}	—	April 20, 2006	Kitt Peak	Spacewatch	·	2.9 km	MPC · JPL
202603	2006 HL_{24}	—	April 20, 2006	Kitt Peak	Spacewatch	KOR	2.1 km	MPC · JPL
202604	2006 HP_{25}	—	April 20, 2006	Kitt Peak	Spacewatch	·	2.6 km	MPC · JPL
202605 Shenchunshan	2006 HY_{30}	Shenchunshan	April 18, 2006	Lulin	Q. Ye, Yang, T.-C.	·	3.1 km	MPC · JPL
202606	2006 HU_{34}	—	April 19, 2006	Mount Lemmon	Mount Lemmon Survey	·	4.7 km	MPC · JPL
202607	2006 HC_{39}	—	April 21, 2006	Kitt Peak	Spacewatch	·	2.6 km	MPC · JPL
202608	2006 HQ_{43}	—	April 24, 2006	Mount Lemmon	Mount Lemmon Survey	·	2.2 km	MPC · JPL
202609	2006 HL_{44}	—	April 24, 2006	Mount Lemmon	Mount Lemmon Survey	·	3.3 km	MPC · JPL
202610	2006 HY_{45}	—	April 25, 2006	Kitt Peak	Spacewatch	·	3.8 km	MPC · JPL
202611	2006 HP_{50}	—	April 26, 2006	Mount Lemmon	Mount Lemmon Survey	·	2.0 km	MPC · JPL
202612	2006 HX_{53}	—	April 19, 2006	Catalina	CSS	·	2.0 km	MPC · JPL
202613	2006 HE_{55}	—	April 21, 2006	Socorro	LINEAR	·	5.0 km	MPC · JPL
202614 Kayleigh	2006 HD_{58}	Kayleigh	April 30, 2006	Kambah	Herald, D.	·	2.8 km	MPC · JPL
202615	2006 HR_{64}	—	April 24, 2006	Kitt Peak	Spacewatch	·	2.3 km	MPC · JPL
202616	2006 HC_{65}	—	April 24, 2006	Kitt Peak	Spacewatch	·	1.7 km	MPC · JPL
202617	2006 HC_{67}	—	April 24, 2006	Kitt Peak	Spacewatch	·	2.6 km	MPC · JPL
202618	2006 HW_{72}	—	April 25, 2006	Kitt Peak	Spacewatch	·	5.6 km	MPC · JPL
202619	2006 HX_{72}	—	April 25, 2006	Kitt Peak	Spacewatch	·	4.5 km	MPC · JPL
202620	2006 HX_{73}	—	April 25, 2006	Kitt Peak	Spacewatch	·	3.3 km	MPC · JPL
202621	2006 HT_{78}	—	April 26, 2006	Kitt Peak	Spacewatch	·	1.1 km	MPC · JPL
202622	2006 HN_{79}	—	April 26, 2006	Kitt Peak	Spacewatch	THM	3.2 km	MPC · JPL
202623	2006 HK_{80}	—	April 26, 2006	Kitt Peak	Spacewatch	·	5.3 km	MPC · JPL
202624	2006 HU_{80}	—	April 26, 2006	Kitt Peak	Spacewatch	·	2.1 km	MPC · JPL
202625	2006 HE_{82}	—	April 26, 2006	Kitt Peak	Spacewatch	·	6.5 km	MPC · JPL
202626	2006 HD_{83}	—	April 26, 2006	Kitt Peak	Spacewatch	EOS	2.0 km	MPC · JPL
202627	2006 HN_{90}	—	April 26, 2006	Kitt Peak	Spacewatch	·	2.7 km	MPC · JPL
202628	2006 HN_{94}	—	April 30, 2006	Kitt Peak	Spacewatch	THM	3.3 km	MPC · JPL
202629	2006 HE_{95}	—	April 30, 2006	Kitt Peak	Spacewatch	·	2.8 km	MPC · JPL
202630	2006 HW_{100}	—	April 30, 2006	Kitt Peak	Spacewatch	·	3.9 km	MPC · JPL
202631	2006 HK_{117}	—	April 27, 2006	Kitt Peak	Spacewatch	THM	2.7 km	MPC · JPL
202632	2006 HN_{120}	—	April 30, 2006	Kitt Peak	Spacewatch	KOR	1.7 km	MPC · JPL
202633	2006 HA_{152}	—	April 24, 2006	Mount Lemmon	Mount Lemmon Survey	KOR	1.6 km	MPC · JPL
202634	2006 HU_{153}	—	April 30, 2006	Kitt Peak	Spacewatch	·	2.5 km	MPC · JPL
202635	2006 JD_{1}	—	May 1, 2006	Kitt Peak	Spacewatch	·	1.8 km	MPC · JPL
202636	2006 JA_{3}	—	May 2, 2006	Mount Lemmon	Mount Lemmon Survey	KOR	1.8 km	MPC · JPL
202637	2006 JT_{4}	—	May 2, 2006	Mount Lemmon	Mount Lemmon Survey	·	5.7 km	MPC · JPL
202638	2006 JC_{8}	—	May 1, 2006	Kitt Peak	Spacewatch	·	3.0 km	MPC · JPL
202639	2006 JU_{8}	—	May 1, 2006	Kitt Peak	Spacewatch	·	1.6 km	MPC · JPL
202640	2006 JW_{13}	—	May 3, 2006	Mount Lemmon	Mount Lemmon Survey	·	2.5 km	MPC · JPL
202641	2006 JE_{15}	—	May 2, 2006	Mount Lemmon	Mount Lemmon Survey	KOR	1.7 km	MPC · JPL
202642	2006 JS_{15}	—	May 2, 2006	Mount Lemmon	Mount Lemmon Survey	·	2.3 km	MPC · JPL
202643	2006 JR_{27}	—	May 2, 2006	Mount Lemmon	Mount Lemmon Survey	·	2.2 km	MPC · JPL
202644	2006 JU_{33}	—	May 4, 2006	Mount Lemmon	Mount Lemmon Survey	THM	2.5 km	MPC · JPL
202645	2006 JD_{34}	—	May 4, 2006	Kitt Peak	Spacewatch	THM	3.4 km	MPC · JPL
202646	2006 JM_{34}	—	May 4, 2006	Kitt Peak	Spacewatch	·	1.8 km	MPC · JPL
202647	2006 JR_{38}	—	May 6, 2006	Kitt Peak	Spacewatch	·	2.7 km	MPC · JPL
202648	2006 JK_{42}	—	May 2, 2006	Mount Nyukasa	Japan Aerospace Exploration Agency	·	2.8 km	MPC · JPL
202649	2006 JS_{46}	—	May 1, 2006	Socorro	LINEAR	·	3.6 km	MPC · JPL
202650	2006 JL_{47}	—	May 1, 2006	Socorro	LINEAR	MAR	1.6 km	MPC · JPL
202651	2006 JO_{56}	—	May 6, 2006	Siding Spring	SSS	·	2.6 km	MPC · JPL
202652	2006 JA_{58}	—	May 5, 2006	Kitt Peak	Spacewatch	·	4.8 km	MPC · JPL
202653	2006 KW	—	May 18, 2006	Palomar	NEAT	·	5.1 km	MPC · JPL
202654	2006 KY_{6}	—	May 19, 2006	Mount Lemmon	Mount Lemmon Survey	·	2.5 km	MPC · JPL
202655	2006 KK_{10}	—	May 19, 2006	Mount Lemmon	Mount Lemmon Survey	KOR	1.9 km	MPC · JPL
202656	2006 KE_{11}	—	May 19, 2006	Mount Lemmon	Mount Lemmon Survey	·	2.7 km	MPC · JPL
202657	2006 KV_{15}	—	May 20, 2006	Kitt Peak	Spacewatch	KOR	2.0 km	MPC · JPL
202658	2006 KW_{20}	—	May 20, 2006	Mount Lemmon	Mount Lemmon Survey	·	2.0 km	MPC · JPL
202659	2006 KU_{22}	—	May 20, 2006	Mount Lemmon	Mount Lemmon Survey	·	2.6 km	MPC · JPL
202660	2006 KK_{39}	—	May 19, 2006	Palomar	NEAT	·	3.4 km	MPC · JPL
202661	2006 KR_{49}	—	May 21, 2006	Kitt Peak	Spacewatch	·	2.5 km	MPC · JPL
202662	2006 KE_{63}	—	May 23, 2006	Mount Lemmon	Mount Lemmon Survey	·	1.2 km	MPC · JPL
202663	2006 KE_{78}	—	May 24, 2006	Mount Lemmon	Mount Lemmon Survey	·	2.2 km	MPC · JPL
202664	2006 KD_{94}	—	May 25, 2006	Kitt Peak	Spacewatch	·	3.3 km	MPC · JPL
202665	2006 KX_{100}	—	May 24, 2006	Palomar	NEAT	·	2.0 km	MPC · JPL
202666	2006 KG_{101}	—	May 25, 2006	Mount Lemmon	Mount Lemmon Survey	·	2.4 km	MPC · JPL
202667	2006 KD_{102}	—	May 27, 2006	Kitt Peak	Spacewatch	·	3.4 km	MPC · JPL
202668	2006 KP_{106}	—	May 31, 2006	Mount Lemmon	Mount Lemmon Survey	·	1.5 km	MPC · JPL
202669	2006 KB_{107}	—	May 31, 2006	Mount Lemmon	Mount Lemmon Survey	·	2.7 km	MPC · JPL
202670	2006 KC_{115}	—	May 29, 2006	Kitt Peak	Spacewatch	·	2.5 km	MPC · JPL
202671	2006 KA_{121}	—	May 21, 2006	Palomar	NEAT	·	3.8 km	MPC · JPL
202672	2006 KW_{122}	—	May 23, 2006	Kitt Peak	Spacewatch	VER	5.4 km	MPC · JPL
202673	2006 LA_{5}	—	June 14, 2006	Siding Spring	SSS	·	6.8 km	MPC · JPL
202674	2006 LT_{5}	—	June 5, 2006	Socorro	LINEAR	·	3.0 km	MPC · JPL
202675	2006 MB_{1}	—	June 16, 2006	Kitt Peak	Spacewatch	·	5.8 km	MPC · JPL
202676	2006 MH_{8}	—	June 18, 2006	Kitt Peak	Spacewatch	·	3.5 km	MPC · JPL
202677	2006 QG_{39}	—	August 19, 2006	Anderson Mesa	LONEOS	·	3.8 km	MPC · JPL
202678	2006 QF_{167}	—	August 30, 2006	Anderson Mesa	LONEOS	·	5.8 km	MPC · JPL
202679	2006 SG_{142}	—	September 19, 2006	Catalina	CSS	·	2.5 km	MPC · JPL
202680	2006 TV_{63}	—	October 10, 2006	Palomar	NEAT	·	4.2 km	MPC · JPL
202681	2006 UX_{89}	—	October 17, 2006	Kitt Peak	Spacewatch	·	2.5 km	MPC · JPL
202682	2006 UP_{139}	—	October 19, 2006	Mount Lemmon	Mount Lemmon Survey	·	1.9 km	MPC · JPL
202683	2006 US_{216}	—	October 30, 2006	Mount Lemmon	Mount Lemmon Survey	IEO · PHA	390 m	MPC · JPL
202684	2006 VG_{74}	—	November 11, 2006	Kitt Peak	Spacewatch	·	1.9 km	MPC · JPL
202685	2006 VV_{85}	—	November 14, 2006	Kitt Peak	Spacewatch	·	740 m	MPC · JPL
202686 Birkfellner	2007 CH_{54}	Birkfellner	February 9, 2007	Gaisberg	Gierlinger, R.	·	1.5 km	MPC · JPL
202687	2007 DJ_{38}	—	February 17, 2007	Mount Lemmon	Mount Lemmon Survey	·	1.7 km	MPC · JPL
202688	2007 DN_{102}	—	February 21, 2007	Mount Nyukasa	Japan Aerospace Exploration Agency	·	1.0 km	MPC · JPL
202689	2007 DR_{111}	—	February 25, 2007	Kitt Peak	Spacewatch	·	1.6 km	MPC · JPL
202690	2007 EM_{46}	—	March 9, 2007	Kitt Peak	Spacewatch	·	1.1 km	MPC · JPL
202691	2007 EK_{70}	—	March 10, 2007	Kitt Peak	Spacewatch	·	1.4 km	MPC · JPL
202692	2007 EL_{82}	—	March 11, 2007	Mount Lemmon	Mount Lemmon Survey	·	710 m	MPC · JPL
202693	2007 EC_{120}	—	March 13, 2007	Mount Lemmon	Mount Lemmon Survey	EUN	1.3 km	MPC · JPL
202694	2007 EY_{172}	—	March 14, 2007	Kitt Peak	Spacewatch	·	1.0 km	MPC · JPL
202695	2007 EY_{183}	—	March 12, 2007	Mount Lemmon	Mount Lemmon Survey	·	1.3 km	MPC · JPL
202696	2007 ET_{189}	—	March 13, 2007	Mount Lemmon	Mount Lemmon Survey	·	1 km	MPC · JPL
202697	2007 EX_{208}	—	March 14, 2007	Anderson Mesa	LONEOS	EUN	1.7 km	MPC · JPL
202698	2007 ER_{209}	—	March 15, 2007	Mount Lemmon	Mount Lemmon Survey	·	1.2 km	MPC · JPL
202699	2007 EH_{220}	—	March 13, 2007	Mount Lemmon	Mount Lemmon Survey	·	1.4 km	MPC · JPL
202700	2007 FS_{37}	—	March 26, 2007	Mount Lemmon	Mount Lemmon Survey	·	1.8 km	MPC · JPL

== 202701–202800 ==
back to top

Designation			Discovery			Properties		Ref
Permanent	Provisional	Named after	Date	Site	Discoverer(s)	Category	Diam.	Ref
202701	2007 FB_{38}	—	March 25, 2007	Catalina	CSS	H	870 m	MPC · JPL
202702	2007 FT_{42}	—	March 26, 2007	Catalina	CSS	H	980 m	MPC · JPL
202703	2007 FO_{43}	—	March 28, 2007	Siding Spring	SSS	·	4.1 km	MPC · JPL
202704 Utena	2007 GN_{6}	Utena	April 14, 2007	Moletai	K. Černis, Zdanavicius, J.	·	1.1 km	MPC · JPL
202705	2007 GH_{16}	—	April 11, 2007	Kitt Peak	Spacewatch	·	930 m	MPC · JPL
202706	2007 GL_{16}	—	April 11, 2007	Kitt Peak	Spacewatch	·	2.4 km	MPC · JPL
202707	2007 GN_{20}	—	April 11, 2007	Mount Lemmon	Mount Lemmon Survey	MAS	860 m	MPC · JPL
202708	2007 GD_{23}	—	April 11, 2007	Mount Lemmon	Mount Lemmon Survey	MAS	820 m	MPC · JPL
202709	2007 GE_{25}	—	April 12, 2007	Siding Spring	SSS	·	3.4 km	MPC · JPL
202710	2007 GR_{26}	—	April 14, 2007	Kitt Peak	Spacewatch	·	1.2 km	MPC · JPL
202711	2007 GS_{54}	—	April 15, 2007	Kitt Peak	Spacewatch	·	1.0 km	MPC · JPL
202712	2007 GC_{61}	—	April 15, 2007	Kitt Peak	Spacewatch	·	1.6 km	MPC · JPL
202713	2007 GP_{64}	—	April 15, 2007	Kitt Peak	Spacewatch	·	590 m	MPC · JPL
202714	2007 HZ_{7}	—	April 18, 2007	Anderson Mesa	LONEOS	V	780 m	MPC · JPL
202715	2007 HF_{16}	—	April 19, 2007	Lulin	LUSS	(5)	2.4 km	MPC · JPL
202716	2007 HC_{19}	—	April 18, 2007	Anderson Mesa	LONEOS	·	1.4 km	MPC · JPL
202717	2007 HC_{20}	—	April 18, 2007	Kitt Peak	Spacewatch	·	950 m	MPC · JPL
202718	2007 HN_{25}	—	April 18, 2007	Mount Lemmon	Mount Lemmon Survey	·	1.3 km	MPC · JPL
202719	2007 HE_{27}	—	April 18, 2007	Mount Lemmon	Mount Lemmon Survey	·	3.1 km	MPC · JPL
202720	2007 HF_{35}	—	April 19, 2007	Kitt Peak	Spacewatch	·	1.7 km	MPC · JPL
202721	2007 HF_{36}	—	April 19, 2007	Kitt Peak	Spacewatch	H	600 m	MPC · JPL
202722	2007 HU_{43}	—	April 22, 2007	Mount Lemmon	Mount Lemmon Survey	MAR	1.4 km	MPC · JPL
202723	2007 HY_{62}	—	April 22, 2007	Mount Lemmon	Mount Lemmon Survey	BRG	1.3 km	MPC · JPL
202724	2007 HD_{65}	—	April 22, 2007	Mount Lemmon	Mount Lemmon Survey	JUN	3.1 km	MPC · JPL
202725	2007 HG_{75}	—	April 22, 2007	Kitt Peak	Spacewatch	·	2.0 km	MPC · JPL
202726	2007 HN_{79}	—	April 23, 2007	Mount Lemmon	Mount Lemmon Survey	·	2.0 km	MPC · JPL
202727	2007 HP_{90}	—	April 25, 2007	Kitt Peak	Spacewatch	·	970 m	MPC · JPL
202728	2007 JU_{9}	—	May 9, 2007	Reedy Creek	J. Broughton	·	3.2 km	MPC · JPL
202729	2007 JK_{12}	—	May 7, 2007	Kitt Peak	Spacewatch	·	2.5 km	MPC · JPL
202730	2007 JU_{12}	—	May 7, 2007	Kitt Peak	Spacewatch	·	2.6 km	MPC · JPL
202731	2007 JU_{13}	—	May 9, 2007	Mount Lemmon	Mount Lemmon Survey	·	930 m	MPC · JPL
202732	2007 JW_{15}	—	May 10, 2007	Mount Lemmon	Mount Lemmon Survey	·	2.1 km	MPC · JPL
202733	2007 JM_{22}	—	May 9, 2007	Kitt Peak	Spacewatch	·	3.0 km	MPC · JPL
202734	2007 JU_{32}	—	May 12, 2007	Mount Lemmon	Mount Lemmon Survey	V	920 m	MPC · JPL
202735	2007 KJ_{1}	—	May 17, 2007	Kitt Peak	Spacewatch	NYS	1.4 km	MPC · JPL
202736 Julietclare	2007 KB_{2}	Julietclare	May 18, 2007	Heidelberg	F. Hormuth	·	1.5 km	MPC · JPL
202737	2007 KT_{5}	—	May 24, 2007	Mount Lemmon	Mount Lemmon Survey	KOR	2.1 km	MPC · JPL
202738	2007 LK_{1}	—	June 10, 2007	Bisei SG Center	BATTeRS	·	4.2 km	MPC · JPL
202739	2007 LP_{29}	—	June 15, 2007	Kitt Peak	Spacewatch	·	1.1 km	MPC · JPL
202740 Vicsympho	2007 LB_{30}	Vicsympho	June 11, 2007	Mauna Kea	D. D. Balam	·	3.3 km	MPC · JPL
202741	2007 LQ_{32}	—	June 15, 2007	Socorro	LINEAR	·	4.0 km	MPC · JPL
202742	2007 MZ_{11}	—	June 21, 2007	Mount Lemmon	Mount Lemmon Survey	·	2.2 km	MPC · JPL
202743	2007 MB_{12}	—	June 21, 2007	Mount Lemmon	Mount Lemmon Survey	·	2.7 km	MPC · JPL
202744	2007 MW_{14}	—	June 20, 2007	Kitt Peak	Spacewatch	·	1.9 km	MPC · JPL
202745	2007 ND	—	July 6, 2007	Reedy Creek	J. Broughton	·	4.9 km	MPC · JPL
202746	2007 NO	—	July 8, 2007	Reedy Creek	J. Broughton	·	3.9 km	MPC · JPL
202747	2007 OU_{1}	—	July 18, 2007	Reedy Creek	J. Broughton	·	1.8 km	MPC · JPL
202748	2007 OV_{3}	—	July 18, 2007	Eskridge	Farpoint	·	2.3 km	MPC · JPL
202749	2007 PH_{3}	—	August 6, 2007	Siding Spring	SSS	·	4.5 km	MPC · JPL
202750 Christophertonge	2007 PQ_{7}	Christophertonge	August 9, 2007	La Cañada	Lacruz, J.	EOS	3.0 km	MPC · JPL
202751	2007 PR_{23}	—	August 12, 2007	Socorro	LINEAR	·	2.6 km	MPC · JPL
202752	2007 PX_{30}	—	August 5, 2007	Socorro	LINEAR	L4	21 km	MPC · JPL
202753	2007 PK_{45}	—	August 7, 2007	Siding Spring	SSS	·	5.9 km	MPC · JPL
202754	2007 PK_{46}	—	August 9, 2007	Kitt Peak	Spacewatch	·	2.4 km	MPC · JPL
202755	2007 QW_{1}	—	August 20, 2007	Bisei SG Center	BATTeRS	·	3.7 km	MPC · JPL
202756	2007 QL_{11}	—	August 23, 2007	Kitt Peak	Spacewatch	L4	12 km	MPC · JPL
202757	2007 QY_{14}	—	August 23, 2007	Kitt Peak	Spacewatch	·	1.2 km	MPC · JPL
202758	2007 RJ_{19}	—	September 4, 2007	Junk Bond	D. Healy	L4	10 km	MPC · JPL
202759	2007 RL_{57}	—	September 9, 2007	Kitt Peak	Spacewatch	·	4.6 km	MPC · JPL
202760	2007 RP_{64}	—	September 10, 2007	Mount Lemmon	Mount Lemmon Survey	·	2.0 km	MPC · JPL
202761	2007 RB_{65}	—	September 10, 2007	Mount Lemmon	Mount Lemmon Survey	KOR	1.7 km	MPC · JPL
202762	2007 RS_{69}	—	September 10, 2007	Kitt Peak	Spacewatch	·	2.7 km	MPC · JPL
202763	2007 RW_{94}	—	September 10, 2007	Kitt Peak	Spacewatch	KOR	2.2 km	MPC · JPL
202764	2007 RM_{152}	—	September 10, 2007	Kitt Peak	Spacewatch	·	4.0 km	MPC · JPL
202765	2007 RZ_{155}	—	September 10, 2007	Mount Lemmon	Mount Lemmon Survey	MRX	1.6 km	MPC · JPL
202766	2007 RE_{197}	—	September 13, 2007	Mount Lemmon	Mount Lemmon Survey	·	4.5 km	MPC · JPL
202767	2007 RA_{220}	—	September 14, 2007	Mount Lemmon	Mount Lemmon Survey	·	1.8 km	MPC · JPL
202768	2007 RT_{228}	—	September 11, 2007	Mount Lemmon	Mount Lemmon Survey	·	1.4 km	MPC · JPL
202769	2007 RF_{234}	—	September 12, 2007	Catalina	CSS	·	2.3 km	MPC · JPL
202770	2007 RW_{238}	—	September 14, 2007	Catalina	CSS	HYG	4.6 km	MPC · JPL
202771	2007 RH_{278}	—	September 5, 2007	Catalina	CSS	CYB	7.1 km	MPC · JPL
202772	2007 TS	—	October 3, 2007	Mayhill	Lowe, A.	·	2.1 km	MPC · JPL
202773	2007 TY_{2}	—	October 3, 2007	Tiki	Tiki	·	4.0 km	MPC · JPL
202774	2007 TX_{213}	—	October 7, 2007	Kitt Peak	Spacewatch	·	1.9 km	MPC · JPL
202775	2007 TF_{235}	—	October 9, 2007	Mount Lemmon	Mount Lemmon Survey	KOR	1.8 km	MPC · JPL
202776	2007 TK_{348}	—	October 14, 2007	Mount Lemmon	Mount Lemmon Survey	·	1.5 km	MPC · JPL
202777	2007 TP_{351}	—	October 14, 2007	Mount Lemmon	Mount Lemmon Survey	·	3.6 km	MPC · JPL
202778 Dmytria	2007 UN_{3}	Dmytria	October 16, 2007	Andrushivka	Andrushivka	EOS	2.9 km	MPC · JPL
202779	2007 UY_{10}	—	October 18, 2007	Anderson Mesa	LONEOS	·	4.0 km	MPC · JPL
202780	2007 VA_{169}	—	November 5, 2007	Kitt Peak	Spacewatch	·	1.2 km	MPC · JPL
202781	2007 VP_{297}	—	November 11, 2007	Catalina	CSS	·	2.4 km	MPC · JPL
202782	2007 VM_{299}	—	November 12, 2007	Catalina	CSS	·	4.7 km	MPC · JPL
202783	2007 YK_{2}	—	December 19, 2007	Mount Lemmon	Mount Lemmon Survey	L4	22 km	MPC · JPL
202784 Gangkeda	2008 DJ_{69}	Gangkeda	February 29, 2008	XuYi	PMO NEO Survey Program	·	2.7 km	MPC · JPL
202785	2008 GE_{44}	—	April 4, 2008	Kitt Peak	Spacewatch	·	840 m	MPC · JPL
202786	2008 MF_{1}	—	June 28, 2008	Siding Spring	SSS	T_{j} (2.99)	7.4 km	MPC · JPL
202787 Kestecher	2008 OG	Kestecher	July 25, 2008	La Sagra	OAM	·	1.5 km	MPC · JPL
202788	2008 OK_{18}	—	July 30, 2008	Mount Lemmon	Mount Lemmon Survey	·	1.0 km	MPC · JPL
202789	2008 PU_{11}	—	August 9, 2008	Reedy Creek	J. Broughton	·	6.3 km	MPC · JPL
202790 Babits	2008 QR_{3}	Babits	August 25, 2008	Piszkéstető	K. Sárneczky	·	1.8 km	MPC · JPL
202791	2008 QC_{4}	—	August 24, 2008	La Sagra	OAM	L4	10 km	MPC · JPL
202792	2008 QB_{6}	—	August 25, 2008	Reedy Creek	J. Broughton	EOS	3.5 km	MPC · JPL
202793	2008 QG_{13}	—	August 27, 2008	La Sagra	OAM	·	1.7 km	MPC · JPL
202794	2008 QO_{16}	—	August 25, 2008	La Sagra	OAM	EOS	2.8 km	MPC · JPL
202795	2008 QD_{17}	—	August 27, 2008	La Sagra	OAM	KOR	1.9 km	MPC · JPL
202796	2008 QQ_{29}	—	August 24, 2008	La Sagra	OAM	·	1.6 km	MPC · JPL
202797	2008 QR_{30}	—	August 30, 2008	Socorro	LINEAR	L4	13 km	MPC · JPL
202798	2008 QG_{36}	—	August 21, 2008	Kitt Peak	Spacewatch	AGN	1.4 km	MPC · JPL
202799	2008 RB_{22}	—	September 3, 2008	La Sagra	OAM	NYS	1.7 km	MPC · JPL
202800	2008 RZ_{34}	—	September 2, 2008	Kitt Peak	Spacewatch	·	3.8 km	MPC · JPL

== 202801–202900 ==
back to top

Designation			Discovery			Properties		Ref
Permanent	Provisional	Named after	Date	Site	Discoverer(s)	Category	Diam.	Ref
202801	2008 RC_{47}	—	September 2, 2008	Kitt Peak	Spacewatch	·	1.8 km	MPC · JPL
202802	2008 RE_{79}	—	September 9, 2008	Bergisch Gladbach	W. Bickel	GEF ·	4.2 km	MPC · JPL
202803	2008 RZ_{104}	—	September 6, 2008	Mount Lemmon	Mount Lemmon Survey	·	1.9 km	MPC · JPL
202804	2008 RO_{116}	—	September 7, 2008	Mount Lemmon	Mount Lemmon Survey	·	2.4 km	MPC · JPL
202805	2008 RS_{116}	—	September 7, 2008	Mount Lemmon	Mount Lemmon Survey	·	3.8 km	MPC · JPL
202806 Sierrastars	2008 SW_{2}	Sierrastars	September 23, 2008	Sierra Stars	Tozzi, F.	·	850 m	MPC · JPL
202807	2008 SR_{11}	—	September 25, 2008	Prairie Grass	Grass, Prairie	·	5.8 km	MPC · JPL
202808	2008 SJ_{15}	—	September 19, 2008	Kitt Peak	Spacewatch	·	2.7 km	MPC · JPL
202809	2008 SQ_{33}	—	September 20, 2008	Mount Lemmon	Mount Lemmon Survey	KOR	1.9 km	MPC · JPL
202810	2008 SE_{42}	—	September 20, 2008	Catalina	CSS	·	3.3 km	MPC · JPL
202811	2008 SO_{43}	—	September 20, 2008	Kitt Peak	Spacewatch	·	3.1 km	MPC · JPL
202812	2008 SB_{46}	—	September 20, 2008	Kitt Peak	Spacewatch	·	2.3 km	MPC · JPL
202813	2008 SV_{52}	—	September 20, 2008	Mount Lemmon	Mount Lemmon Survey	·	1.0 km	MPC · JPL
202814	2008 SX_{60}	—	September 20, 2008	Catalina	CSS	·	3.7 km	MPC · JPL
202815	2008 SQ_{62}	—	September 21, 2008	Kitt Peak	Spacewatch	·	3.8 km	MPC · JPL
202816	2008 SS_{62}	—	September 21, 2008	Kitt Peak	Spacewatch	·	880 m	MPC · JPL
202817	2008 SS_{64}	—	September 21, 2008	Mount Lemmon	Mount Lemmon Survey	·	2.8 km	MPC · JPL
202818	2008 SN_{74}	—	September 23, 2008	Catalina	CSS	·	3.0 km	MPC · JPL
202819 Carlosánchez	2008 SY_{81}	Carlosánchez	September 26, 2008	La Cañada	Lacruz, J.	WIT	1.1 km	MPC · JPL
202820	2008 SQ_{86}	—	September 20, 2008	Kitt Peak	Spacewatch	·	1.3 km	MPC · JPL
202821	2008 SD_{104}	—	September 21, 2008	Kitt Peak	Spacewatch	·	1.4 km	MPC · JPL
202822	2008 SP_{106}	—	September 21, 2008	Kitt Peak	Spacewatch	·	2.1 km	MPC · JPL
202823	2008 SW_{107}	—	September 22, 2008	Kitt Peak	Spacewatch	·	3.7 km	MPC · JPL
202824	2008 SX_{107}	—	September 22, 2008	Kitt Peak	Spacewatch	L4	12 km	MPC · JPL
202825	2008 SX_{115}	—	September 22, 2008	Kitt Peak	Spacewatch	EOS	3.0 km	MPC · JPL
202826	2008 SG_{118}	—	September 22, 2008	Mount Lemmon	Mount Lemmon Survey	·	3.7 km	MPC · JPL
202827	2008 SQ_{143}	—	September 24, 2008	Mount Lemmon	Mount Lemmon Survey	KOR	2.2 km	MPC · JPL
202828	2008 SS_{155}	—	September 23, 2008	Socorro	LINEAR	·	1.1 km	MPC · JPL
202829	2008 SD_{160}	—	September 24, 2008	Socorro	LINEAR	·	2.7 km	MPC · JPL
202830	2008 SY_{166}	—	September 28, 2008	Socorro	LINEAR	·	2.2 km	MPC · JPL
202831	2008 SX_{167}	—	September 28, 2008	Socorro	LINEAR	·	1.7 km	MPC · JPL
202832	2008 SZ_{193}	—	September 25, 2008	Kitt Peak	Spacewatch	·	1.1 km	MPC · JPL
202833	2008 SX_{194}	—	September 25, 2008	Kitt Peak	Spacewatch	THM	3.3 km	MPC · JPL
202834	2008 SW_{195}	—	September 25, 2008	Kitt Peak	Spacewatch	KOR	1.7 km	MPC · JPL
202835	2008 SY_{195}	—	September 25, 2008	Kitt Peak	Spacewatch	(13314)	3.7 km	MPC · JPL
202836	2008 SS_{201}	—	September 26, 2008	Kitt Peak	Spacewatch	·	4.1 km	MPC · JPL
202837	2008 SR_{205}	—	September 26, 2008	Kitt Peak	Spacewatch	·	1.6 km	MPC · JPL
202838	2008 SE_{206}	—	September 26, 2008	Kitt Peak	Spacewatch	·	1.7 km	MPC · JPL
202839	2008 SX_{218}	—	September 30, 2008	La Sagra	OAM	·	1.3 km	MPC · JPL
202840	2008 SG_{235}	—	September 28, 2008	Mount Lemmon	Mount Lemmon Survey	·	700 m	MPC · JPL
202841	2008 SQ_{242}	—	September 29, 2008	Kitt Peak	Spacewatch	THM	2.8 km	MPC · JPL
202842	2008 SU_{264}	—	September 25, 2008	Kitt Peak	Spacewatch	KON	3.2 km	MPC · JPL
202843	2008 SV_{264}	—	September 25, 2008	Kitt Peak	Spacewatch	fast	1.3 km	MPC · JPL
202844	2008 TK_{7}	—	October 3, 2008	La Sagra	OAM	·	4.7 km	MPC · JPL
202845	2008 TN_{12}	—	October 1, 2008	Kitt Peak	Spacewatch	·	2.1 km	MPC · JPL
202846	2008 TK_{20}	—	October 1, 2008	Mount Lemmon	Mount Lemmon Survey	KOR	1.7 km	MPC · JPL
202847	2008 TK_{24}	—	October 2, 2008	Catalina	CSS	·	860 m	MPC · JPL
202848	2008 TG_{48}	—	October 2, 2008	Kitt Peak	Spacewatch	·	1.5 km	MPC · JPL
202849	2008 TM_{74}	—	October 2, 2008	Kitt Peak	Spacewatch	MAS	660 m	MPC · JPL
202850	2008 TM_{78}	—	October 2, 2008	Mount Lemmon	Mount Lemmon Survey	L4	10 km	MPC · JPL
202851	2008 TW_{90}	—	October 3, 2008	Kitt Peak	Spacewatch	·	2.2 km	MPC · JPL
202852	2008 TH_{92}	—	October 4, 2008	Črni Vrh	Mikuž, H.	·	2.2 km	MPC · JPL
202853	2008 TW_{94}	—	October 5, 2008	La Sagra	OAM	EUN	1.9 km	MPC · JPL
202854	2008 TJ_{99}	—	October 6, 2008	Kitt Peak	Spacewatch	L4	14 km	MPC · JPL
202855	2008 TX_{109}	—	October 6, 2008	Mount Lemmon	Mount Lemmon Survey	L4	19 km	MPC · JPL
202856	2008 TN_{116}	—	October 6, 2008	Catalina	CSS	·	2.8 km	MPC · JPL
202857	2008 TT_{117}	—	October 6, 2008	Kitt Peak	Spacewatch	TIR	3.8 km	MPC · JPL
202858	2008 TW_{117}	—	October 6, 2008	Kitt Peak	Spacewatch	·	2.7 km	MPC · JPL
202859	2008 TP_{124}	—	October 8, 2008	Mount Lemmon	Mount Lemmon Survey	·	1.5 km	MPC · JPL
202860	2008 TX_{125}	—	October 8, 2008	Mount Lemmon	Mount Lemmon Survey	·	2.1 km	MPC · JPL
202861	2008 TM_{128}	—	October 8, 2008	Catalina	CSS	·	990 m	MPC · JPL
202862	2008 TT_{128}	—	October 8, 2008	Catalina	CSS	·	1.7 km	MPC · JPL
202863	2008 TD_{161}	—	October 1, 2008	Mount Lemmon	Mount Lemmon Survey	·	2.1 km	MPC · JPL
202864	2008 UY_{3}	—	October 23, 2008	Bergisch Gladbach	W. Bickel	·	960 m	MPC · JPL
202865	2008 UQ_{6}	—	October 22, 2008	Kitt Peak	Spacewatch	·	2.6 km	MPC · JPL
202866	2008 UK_{30}	—	October 20, 2008	Kitt Peak	Spacewatch	·	2.5 km	MPC · JPL
202867	2008 UU_{36}	—	October 20, 2008	Kitt Peak	Spacewatch	·	2.3 km	MPC · JPL
202868	2008 UC_{49}	—	October 20, 2008	Kitt Peak	Spacewatch	·	2.7 km	MPC · JPL
202869	2008 UM_{53}	—	October 20, 2008	Kitt Peak	Spacewatch	·	2.1 km	MPC · JPL
202870	2008 UF_{62}	—	October 21, 2008	Kitt Peak	Spacewatch	·	2.5 km	MPC · JPL
202871	2008 UE_{92}	—	October 23, 2008	Socorro	LINEAR	·	4.1 km	MPC · JPL
202872	2008 UG_{109}	—	October 21, 2008	Kitt Peak	Spacewatch	·	2.6 km	MPC · JPL
202873	2008 UV_{119}	—	October 22, 2008	Kitt Peak	Spacewatch	·	1.5 km	MPC · JPL
202874	2008 UT_{124}	—	October 22, 2008	Kitt Peak	Spacewatch	·	3.0 km	MPC · JPL
202875	2008 UR_{130}	—	October 23, 2008	Kitt Peak	Spacewatch	·	1.0 km	MPC · JPL
202876	2008 UT_{131}	—	October 23, 2008	Kitt Peak	Spacewatch	KOR	1.4 km	MPC · JPL
202877	2008 UW_{145}	—	October 23, 2008	Kitt Peak	Spacewatch	·	1.2 km	MPC · JPL
202878	2008 UH_{184}	—	October 24, 2008	Kitt Peak	Spacewatch	·	950 m	MPC · JPL
202879	2008 UF_{251}	—	October 27, 2008	Kitt Peak	Spacewatch	·	3.2 km	MPC · JPL
202880	2008 UH_{262}	—	October 27, 2008	Kitt Peak	Spacewatch	·	2.4 km	MPC · JPL
202881	2008 UV_{281}	—	October 28, 2008	Kitt Peak	Spacewatch	·	1.6 km	MPC · JPL
202882	2008 UA_{316}	—	October 30, 2008	Kitt Peak	Spacewatch	·	1.9 km	MPC · JPL
202883	4723 P-L	—	September 24, 1960	Palomar	C. J. van Houten, I. van Houten-Groeneveld, T. Gehrels	·	2.8 km	MPC · JPL
202884	7590 P-L	—	October 17, 1960	Palomar	C. J. van Houten, I. van Houten-Groeneveld, T. Gehrels	·	2.1 km	MPC · JPL
202885	3095 T-2	—	September 30, 1973	Palomar	C. J. van Houten, I. van Houten-Groeneveld, T. Gehrels	·	1.2 km	MPC · JPL
202886	1979 OZ_{9}	—	July 24, 1979	Siding Spring	S. J. Bus	·	1.4 km	MPC · JPL
202887	1981 EO_{33}	—	March 1, 1981	Siding Spring	S. J. Bus	·	3.6 km	MPC · JPL
202888	1981 EM_{34}	—	March 2, 1981	Siding Spring	S. J. Bus	·	1.6 km	MPC · JPL
202889	1991 TF_{15}	—	October 6, 1991	Palomar	Lowe, A.	·	1.9 km	MPC · JPL
202890	1991 VN_{7}	—	November 3, 1991	Kitt Peak	Spacewatch	(159)	4.4 km	MPC · JPL
202891	1992 EO_{10}	—	March 2, 1992	La Silla	UESAC	MIS	3.5 km	MPC · JPL
202892	1993 SP	—	September 18, 1993	Kitt Peak	Spacewatch	·	1.4 km	MPC · JPL
202893	1993 TH_{39}	—	October 9, 1993	La Silla	E. W. Elst	·	1.8 km	MPC · JPL
202894	1994 WB_{5}	—	November 28, 1994	Kitt Peak	Spacewatch	·	640 m	MPC · JPL
202895	1994 YP	—	December 28, 1994	Oizumi	T. Kobayashi	·	1.4 km	MPC · JPL
202896	1995 DD_{7}	—	February 24, 1995	Kitt Peak	Spacewatch	·	1.3 km	MPC · JPL
202897	1995 DE_{9}	—	February 24, 1995	Kitt Peak	Spacewatch	NYS	1.4 km	MPC · JPL
202898	1995 FK_{14}	—	March 27, 1995	Kitt Peak	Spacewatch	·	3.0 km	MPC · JPL
202899	1995 FP_{16}	—	March 28, 1995	Kitt Peak	Spacewatch	MAS	890 m	MPC · JPL
202900	1995 FL_{20}	—	March 31, 1995	Kitt Peak	Spacewatch	MAS	1.4 km	MPC · JPL

== 202901–203000 ==
back to top

Designation			Discovery			Properties		Ref
Permanent	Provisional	Named after	Date	Site	Discoverer(s)	Category	Diam.	Ref
202901	1995 OJ_{17}	—	July 30, 1995	Kitt Peak	Spacewatch	·	1.8 km	MPC · JPL
202902	1995 SC_{13}	—	September 18, 1995	Kitt Peak	Spacewatch	·	1.1 km	MPC · JPL
202903	1995 SD_{52}	—	September 26, 1995	Kitt Peak	Spacewatch	·	3.0 km	MPC · JPL
202904	1995 UF_{23}	—	October 19, 1995	Kitt Peak	Spacewatch	·	1.8 km	MPC · JPL
202905	1995 UE_{31}	—	October 21, 1995	Kitt Peak	Spacewatch	·	1.2 km	MPC · JPL
202906	1995 WW_{11}	—	November 16, 1995	Kitt Peak	Spacewatch	(5)	1.8 km	MPC · JPL
202907 Meisenheimer	1996 RH_{1}	Meisenheimer	September 4, 1996	La Silla	Carsenty, U., Mottola, S.	·	2.5 km	MPC · JPL
202908	1996 TH_{11}	—	October 11, 1996	Kitami	K. Endate	·	2.0 km	MPC · JPL
202909 Jakoten	1996 TF_{12}	Jakoten	October 11, 1996	Kuma Kogen	A. Nakamura	·	5.5 km	MPC · JPL
202910	1996 VE_{14}	—	November 5, 1996	Kitt Peak	Spacewatch	MAS	960 m	MPC · JPL
202911	1997 EC_{14}	—	March 3, 1997	Kitt Peak	Spacewatch	(5)	1.8 km	MPC · JPL
202912	1997 MK_{8}	—	June 30, 1997	Kitt Peak	Spacewatch	AGN	1.8 km	MPC · JPL
202913	1997 NV_{5}	—	July 7, 1997	Kitt Peak	Spacewatch	·	1.4 km	MPC · JPL
202914	1997 PA	—	August 1, 1997	Haleakala	NEAT	·	1.5 km	MPC · JPL
202915	1997 TR_{7}	—	October 2, 1997	Caussols	ODAS	·	1.1 km	MPC · JPL
202916	1997 TK_{9}	—	October 2, 1997	Kitt Peak	Spacewatch	·	1.2 km	MPC · JPL
202917	1997 WZ_{5}	—	November 23, 1997	Kitt Peak	Spacewatch	·	3.0 km	MPC · JPL
202918	1997 WK_{20}	—	November 25, 1997	Kitt Peak	Spacewatch	·	2.9 km	MPC · JPL
202919	1997 YJ_{12}	—	December 21, 1997	Kitt Peak	Spacewatch	MAS	900 m	MPC · JPL
202920	1997 YP_{19}	—	December 29, 1997	Xinglong	SCAP	·	1.6 km	MPC · JPL
202921	1998 AM_{1}	—	January 1, 1998	Kitt Peak	Spacewatch	·	3.4 km	MPC · JPL
202922	1998 FM_{31}	—	March 20, 1998	Socorro	LINEAR	·	2.0 km	MPC · JPL
202923	1998 JM_{3}	—	May 2, 1998	Caussols	ODAS	·	2.1 km	MPC · JPL
202924	1998 OK_{5}	—	July 29, 1998	Caussols	ODAS	NEM	3.1 km	MPC · JPL
202925	1998 QF_{29}	—	August 22, 1998	Xinglong	SCAP	·	2.3 km	MPC · JPL
202926	1998 QM_{84}	—	August 24, 1998	Socorro	LINEAR	·	2.8 km	MPC · JPL
202927	1998 SQ_{85}	—	September 26, 1998	Socorro	LINEAR	·	870 m	MPC · JPL
202928	1998 ST_{92}	—	September 26, 1998	Socorro	LINEAR	·	1.1 km	MPC · JPL
202929	1998 SZ_{125}	—	September 26, 1998	Socorro	LINEAR	·	2.7 km	MPC · JPL
202930 Ivezić	1998 SG_{172}	Ivezić	September 19, 1998	Apache Point	SDSS	NEM	2.6 km	MPC · JPL
202931	1998 TB_{1}	—	October 12, 1998	Kitt Peak	Spacewatch	·	2.1 km	MPC · JPL
202932	1998 TF_{27}	—	October 15, 1998	Kitt Peak	Spacewatch	·	800 m	MPC · JPL
202933	1998 VY_{40}	—	November 14, 1998	Kitt Peak	Spacewatch	KOR	1.7 km	MPC · JPL
202934	1998 WC_{39}	—	November 21, 1998	Kitt Peak	Spacewatch	·	2.7 km	MPC · JPL
202935	1998 YJ_{17}	—	December 22, 1998	Kitt Peak	Spacewatch	·	2.2 km	MPC · JPL
202936	1998 YL_{21}	—	December 26, 1998	Kitt Peak	Spacewatch	·	1.1 km	MPC · JPL
202937	1999 AL_{18}	—	January 11, 1999	Kitt Peak	Spacewatch	·	1 km	MPC · JPL
202938	1999 AY_{18}	—	January 13, 1999	Kitt Peak	Spacewatch	·	3.4 km	MPC · JPL
202939	1999 AC_{26}	—	January 15, 1999	Caussols	ODAS	·	1.3 km	MPC · JPL
202940	1999 CD_{5}	—	February 12, 1999	Oizumi	T. Kobayashi	·	1.2 km	MPC · JPL
202941	1999 CD_{14}	—	February 12, 1999	Uenohara	N. Kawasato	·	1.2 km	MPC · JPL
202942	1999 CK_{89}	—	February 10, 1999	Socorro	LINEAR	·	1.1 km	MPC · JPL
202943	1999 EO	—	March 6, 1999	Kitt Peak	Spacewatch	·	3.0 km	MPC · JPL
202944	1999 FM_{2}	—	March 16, 1999	Kitt Peak	Spacewatch	·	3.6 km	MPC · JPL
202945	1999 FY_{78}	—	March 20, 1999	Apache Point	SDSS	·	4.5 km	MPC · JPL
202946	1999 FL_{96}	—	March 21, 1999	Apache Point	SDSS	PHO	1.5 km	MPC · JPL
202947	1999 GC_{11}	—	April 11, 1999	Kitt Peak	Spacewatch	·	740 m	MPC · JPL
202948	1999 JU_{41}	—	May 10, 1999	Socorro	LINEAR	NYS	1.5 km	MPC · JPL
202949	1999 JQ_{87}	—	May 12, 1999	Socorro	LINEAR	·	2.9 km	MPC · JPL
202950	1999 JB_{116}	—	May 13, 1999	Socorro	LINEAR	V	1.2 km	MPC · JPL
202951	1999 RE	—	September 3, 1999	Ondřejov	L. Kotková	(1547)	3.3 km	MPC · JPL
202952	1999 RW_{20}	—	September 7, 1999	Socorro	LINEAR	·	2.4 km	MPC · JPL
202953	1999 RS_{45}	—	September 8, 1999	Uccle	T. Pauwels	·	2.3 km	MPC · JPL
202954	1999 RU_{68}	—	September 7, 1999	Socorro	LINEAR	·	1.7 km	MPC · JPL
202955	1999 RQ_{89}	—	September 7, 1999	Socorro	LINEAR	·	1.6 km	MPC · JPL
202956	1999 RR_{91}	—	September 7, 1999	Socorro	LINEAR	·	2.1 km	MPC · JPL
202957	1999 RF_{103}	—	September 8, 1999	Socorro	LINEAR	·	4.3 km	MPC · JPL
202958	1999 RQ_{109}	—	September 8, 1999	Socorro	LINEAR	·	5.7 km	MPC · JPL
202959	1999 RA_{151}	—	September 9, 1999	Socorro	LINEAR	(5)	2.3 km	MPC · JPL
202960	1999 RM_{156}	—	September 9, 1999	Socorro	LINEAR	·	2.2 km	MPC · JPL
202961	1999 RU_{157}	—	September 9, 1999	Socorro	LINEAR	(5)	1.7 km	MPC · JPL
202962	1999 RU_{225}	—	September 4, 1999	Catalina	CSS	·	2.0 km	MPC · JPL
202963	1999 RU_{242}	—	September 4, 1999	Anderson Mesa	LONEOS	·	2.1 km	MPC · JPL
202964	1999 TH_{15}	—	October 12, 1999	Ondřejov	P. Kušnirák, P. Pravec	·	2.4 km	MPC · JPL
202965	1999 TK_{28}	—	October 4, 1999	Socorro	LINEAR	3:2	6.6 km	MPC · JPL
202966	1999 TE_{32}	—	October 4, 1999	Socorro	LINEAR	MAR	1.6 km	MPC · JPL
202967	1999 TH_{69}	—	October 9, 1999	Kitt Peak	Spacewatch	·	1.9 km	MPC · JPL
202968	1999 TR_{70}	—	October 9, 1999	Kitt Peak	Spacewatch	·	1.7 km	MPC · JPL
202969	1999 TP_{77}	—	October 10, 1999	Kitt Peak	Spacewatch	(5)	1.6 km	MPC · JPL
202970	1999 TF_{81}	—	October 11, 1999	Kitt Peak	Spacewatch	·	1.7 km	MPC · JPL
202971	1999 TW_{95}	—	October 2, 1999	Socorro	LINEAR	·	2.4 km	MPC · JPL
202972	1999 TP_{97}	—	October 2, 1999	Socorro	LINEAR	·	3.9 km	MPC · JPL
202973	1999 TW_{101}	—	October 2, 1999	Socorro	LINEAR	·	3.1 km	MPC · JPL
202974	1999 TZ_{113}	—	October 4, 1999	Socorro	LINEAR	·	2.4 km	MPC · JPL
202975	1999 TT_{121}	—	October 4, 1999	Socorro	LINEAR	T_{j} (2.98) · 3:2	6.3 km	MPC · JPL
202976	1999 TV_{129}	—	October 6, 1999	Socorro	LINEAR	·	2.5 km	MPC · JPL
202977	1999 TU_{159}	—	October 9, 1999	Socorro	LINEAR	(5)	1.7 km	MPC · JPL
202978	1999 TF_{165}	—	October 10, 1999	Socorro	LINEAR	·	2.1 km	MPC · JPL
202979	1999 TR_{202}	—	October 13, 1999	Socorro	LINEAR	(5)	1.7 km	MPC · JPL
202980	1999 TP_{222}	—	October 2, 1999	Socorro	LINEAR	·	2.0 km	MPC · JPL
202981	1999 TR_{238}	—	October 4, 1999	Catalina	CSS	·	2.9 km	MPC · JPL
202982	1999 TD_{239}	—	October 4, 1999	Catalina	CSS	T_{j} (2.99) · 3:2 · SHU	9.9 km	MPC · JPL
202983	1999 TL_{272}	—	October 3, 1999	Socorro	LINEAR	·	3.0 km	MPC · JPL
202984	1999 UR_{29}	—	October 31, 1999	Kitt Peak	Spacewatch	·	2.6 km	MPC · JPL
202985	1999 VC_{18}	—	November 2, 1999	Kitt Peak	Spacewatch	·	1.4 km	MPC · JPL
202986	1999 VW_{33}	—	November 3, 1999	Socorro	LINEAR	·	2.1 km	MPC · JPL
202987	1999 VU_{40}	—	November 1, 1999	Kitt Peak	Spacewatch	·	1.7 km	MPC · JPL
202988	1999 VW_{41}	—	November 4, 1999	Kitt Peak	Spacewatch	·	2.0 km	MPC · JPL
202989	1999 VP_{78}	—	November 4, 1999	Socorro	LINEAR	·	2.1 km	MPC · JPL
202990	1999 VN_{101}	—	November 9, 1999	Socorro	LINEAR	·	4.4 km	MPC · JPL
202991	1999 VR_{110}	—	November 9, 1999	Socorro	LINEAR	·	2.9 km	MPC · JPL
202992	1999 VG_{135}	—	November 13, 1999	Kitt Peak	Spacewatch	T_{j} (2.97)	4.8 km	MPC · JPL
202993	1999 VP_{135}	—	November 7, 1999	Socorro	LINEAR	·	2.8 km	MPC · JPL
202994	1999 VT_{138}	—	November 9, 1999	Kitt Peak	Spacewatch	GEF	1.7 km	MPC · JPL
202995	1999 VC_{142}	—	November 10, 1999	Kitt Peak	Spacewatch	·	1.6 km	MPC · JPL
202996	1999 VN_{166}	—	November 14, 1999	Socorro	LINEAR	·	2.7 km	MPC · JPL
202997	1999 VT_{175}	—	November 12, 1999	Kitt Peak	Spacewatch	·	1.7 km	MPC · JPL
202998	1999 VJ_{183}	—	November 12, 1999	Socorro	LINEAR	·	2.3 km	MPC · JPL
202999	1999 VE_{186}	—	November 15, 1999	Socorro	LINEAR	·	2.6 km	MPC · JPL
203000	1999 VC_{195}	—	November 3, 1999	Catalina	CSS	RAF	1.7 km	MPC · JPL

back to top

== See also ==
- Meanings of minor-planet names: 202001–203000
