= List of minor planets: 204001–205000 =

The following is a partial list of minor planets, running from minor-planet number 204001 through 205000, inclusive. The primary data for this and other partial lists is based on JPL's "Small-Body Orbital Elements" and data available from the Minor Planet Center. Critical list information is also provided by the MPC, unless otherwise specified from Lowell Observatory. A detailed description of the table's columns and additional sources are given on the main page including a complete list of every page in this series, and a statistical break-up on the dynamical classification of minor planets.

Also see the summary list of all named bodies in numerical and alphabetical order, and the corresponding naming citations for the number range of this particular list. New namings may only be added to this list after official publication, as the preannouncement of names is condemned by the Working Group for Small Bodies Nomenclature of the International Astronomical Union.

Near-Earth obj.	MBA (inner)	MBA (outer)	Centaur
Mars-crosser	MBA (middle)	Jupiter trojan	Trans-Neptunian obj.
Unclassified

== 204001–204100 ==
Designation			Discovery			Properties		Ref
Permanent	Provisional	Named after	Date	Site	Discoverer(s)	Category	Diam.	Ref
204001	2003 TV_{38}	—	October 2, 2003	Kitt Peak	Spacewatch	·	2.3 km	MPC · JPL
204002	2003 TT_{51}	—	October 5, 2003	Kitt Peak	Spacewatch	WIT	1.2 km	MPC · JPL
204003	2003 UQ_{7}	—	October 16, 2003	Kingsnake	J. V. McClusky	·	4.4 km	MPC · JPL
204004	2003 UG_{9}	—	October 18, 2003	Socorro	LINEAR	·	7.2 km	MPC · JPL
204005	2003 UH_{13}	—	October 17, 2003	Anderson Mesa	LONEOS	H	880 m	MPC · JPL
204006	2003 UK_{14}	—	October 16, 2003	Kitt Peak	Spacewatch	·	1.8 km	MPC · JPL
204007	2003 UQ_{14}	—	October 16, 2003	Kitt Peak	Spacewatch	·	2.3 km	MPC · JPL
204008	2003 UR_{21}	—	October 20, 2003	Kingsnake	J. V. McClusky	·	3.8 km	MPC · JPL
204009	2003 UD_{27}	—	October 23, 2003	Goodricke-Pigott	R. A. Tucker	·	2.3 km	MPC · JPL
204010	2003 US_{27}	—	October 22, 2003	Goodricke-Pigott	R. A. Tucker	·	2.8 km	MPC · JPL
204011	2003 UX_{29}	—	October 23, 2003	Goodricke-Pigott	R. A. Tucker	·	2.2 km	MPC · JPL
204012	2003 UW_{35}	—	October 16, 2003	Palomar	NEAT	·	2.9 km	MPC · JPL
204013	2003 UU_{38}	—	October 27, 2003	Ondřejov	P. Kušnirák	PAD	2.3 km	MPC · JPL
204014	2003 UA_{39}	—	October 16, 2003	Kitt Peak	Spacewatch	·	3.8 km	MPC · JPL
204015	2003 UK_{39}	—	October 16, 2003	Kitt Peak	Spacewatch	·	3.6 km	MPC · JPL
204016	2003 UW_{41}	—	October 17, 2003	Kitt Peak	Spacewatch	·	1.6 km	MPC · JPL
204017	2003 UM_{43}	—	October 17, 2003	Kitt Peak	Spacewatch	(5)	1.8 km	MPC · JPL
204018	2003 UE_{51}	—	October 18, 2003	Palomar	NEAT	·	3.3 km	MPC · JPL
204019	2003 UB_{61}	—	October 16, 2003	Palomar	NEAT	·	5.2 km	MPC · JPL
204020	2003 UJ_{61}	—	October 16, 2003	Anderson Mesa	LONEOS	·	4.7 km	MPC · JPL
204021	2003 UB_{64}	—	October 16, 2003	Anderson Mesa	LONEOS	·	3.4 km	MPC · JPL
204022	2003 UE_{65}	—	October 16, 2003	Palomar	NEAT	·	2.2 km	MPC · JPL
204023	2003 UX_{74}	—	October 17, 2003	Anderson Mesa	LONEOS	RAF	1.6 km	MPC · JPL
204024	2003 UU_{77}	—	October 17, 2003	Kitt Peak	Spacewatch	·	5.4 km	MPC · JPL
204025	2003 UA_{79}	—	October 18, 2003	Kitt Peak	Spacewatch	·	2.8 km	MPC · JPL
204026	2003 UN_{85}	—	October 18, 2003	Kitt Peak	Spacewatch	·	2.1 km	MPC · JPL
204027	2003 UJ_{88}	—	October 19, 2003	Anderson Mesa	LONEOS	·	3.9 km	MPC · JPL
204028	2003 US_{88}	—	October 19, 2003	Anderson Mesa	LONEOS	·	3.5 km	MPC · JPL
204029	2003 UK_{92}	—	October 20, 2003	Palomar	NEAT	·	3.4 km	MPC · JPL
204030	2003 UU_{92}	—	October 20, 2003	Palomar	NEAT	(5)	1.9 km	MPC · JPL
204031	2003 UP_{100}	—	October 19, 2003	Haleakala	NEAT	·	4.6 km	MPC · JPL
204032	2003 UO_{115}	—	October 20, 2003	Palomar	NEAT	·	3.0 km	MPC · JPL
204033	2003 UF_{118}	—	October 17, 2003	Anderson Mesa	LONEOS	EOS	2.6 km	MPC · JPL
204034	2003 UG_{131}	—	October 19, 2003	Palomar	NEAT	EUN	4.6 km	MPC · JPL
204035	2003 UP_{133}	—	October 20, 2003	Socorro	LINEAR	WIT	1.6 km	MPC · JPL
204036	2003 UX_{140}	—	October 16, 2003	Palomar	NEAT	·	3.3 km	MPC · JPL
204037	2003 UE_{152}	—	October 21, 2003	Kitt Peak	Spacewatch	·	3.3 km	MPC · JPL
204038	2003 UP_{152}	—	October 21, 2003	Palomar	NEAT	·	3.1 km	MPC · JPL
204039	2003 UJ_{155}	—	October 20, 2003	Socorro	LINEAR	·	2.4 km	MPC · JPL
204040	2003 UW_{158}	—	October 20, 2003	Kitt Peak	Spacewatch	·	2.1 km	MPC · JPL
204041	2003 UE_{165}	—	October 21, 2003	Palomar	NEAT	·	3.2 km	MPC · JPL
204042	2003 UY_{170}	—	October 19, 2003	Kitt Peak	Spacewatch	·	2.0 km	MPC · JPL
204043	2003 UY_{177}	—	October 21, 2003	Palomar	NEAT	·	3.0 km	MPC · JPL
204044	2003 UZ_{185}	—	October 22, 2003	Socorro	LINEAR	·	3.2 km	MPC · JPL
204045	2003 UN_{194}	—	October 20, 2003	Socorro	LINEAR	·	1.9 km	MPC · JPL
204046	2003 UG_{209}	—	October 23, 2003	Anderson Mesa	LONEOS	·	3.1 km	MPC · JPL
204047	2003 UY_{212}	—	October 23, 2003	Kitt Peak	Spacewatch	EOS	2.3 km	MPC · JPL
204048	2003 UY_{220}	—	October 22, 2003	Kitt Peak	Spacewatch	NEM	2.7 km	MPC · JPL
204049	2003 UV_{223}	—	October 22, 2003	Socorro	LINEAR	·	3.5 km	MPC · JPL
204050	2003 UQ_{230}	—	October 23, 2003	Kitt Peak	Spacewatch	·	2.3 km	MPC · JPL
204051	2003 UW_{230}	—	October 24, 2003	Socorro	LINEAR	·	3.1 km	MPC · JPL
204052	2003 UK_{232}	—	October 24, 2003	Socorro	LINEAR	·	2.4 km	MPC · JPL
204053	2003 UX_{236}	—	October 23, 2003	Kitt Peak	Spacewatch	·	2.4 km	MPC · JPL
204054	2003 UG_{237}	—	October 23, 2003	Haleakala	NEAT	·	1.8 km	MPC · JPL
204055	2003 UM_{237}	—	October 23, 2003	Haleakala	NEAT	·	2.9 km	MPC · JPL
204056	2003 US_{245}	—	October 24, 2003	Socorro	LINEAR	·	3.4 km	MPC · JPL
204057	2003 UK_{256}	—	October 25, 2003	Socorro	LINEAR	·	3.0 km	MPC · JPL
204058	2003 UJ_{257}	—	October 25, 2003	Socorro	LINEAR	·	3.2 km	MPC · JPL
204059	2003 UV_{261}	—	October 26, 2003	Kitt Peak	Spacewatch	·	3.9 km	MPC · JPL
204060	2003 UA_{263}	—	October 27, 2003	Kitt Peak	Spacewatch	·	2.1 km	MPC · JPL
204061	2003 UQ_{270}	—	October 17, 2003	Palomar	NEAT	·	2.6 km	MPC · JPL
204062	2003 UX_{271}	—	October 28, 2003	Socorro	LINEAR	·	1.9 km	MPC · JPL
204063	2003 US_{278}	—	October 25, 2003	Socorro	LINEAR	·	2.6 km	MPC · JPL
204064	2003 UU_{290}	—	October 23, 2003	Kitt Peak	Spacewatch	MRX	1.3 km	MPC · JPL
204065	2003 UQ_{295}	—	October 16, 2003	Kitt Peak	Spacewatch	(29841)	1.7 km	MPC · JPL
204066	2003 UY_{296}	—	October 16, 2003	Kitt Peak	Spacewatch	EOS	4.5 km	MPC · JPL
204067	2003 UB_{300}	—	October 16, 2003	Palomar	NEAT	·	2.1 km	MPC · JPL
204068	2003 UY_{307}	—	October 18, 2003	Kitt Peak	Spacewatch	·	1.9 km	MPC · JPL
204069	2003 UR_{316}	—	October 27, 2003	Kitt Peak	Spacewatch	·	2.6 km	MPC · JPL
204070	2003 UU_{336}	—	October 18, 2003	Kitt Peak	Spacewatch	·	2.4 km	MPC · JPL
204071	2003 UG_{379}	—	October 22, 2003	Apache Point	SDSS	NYS	1.3 km	MPC · JPL
204072	2003 US_{398}	—	October 22, 2003	Apache Point	SDSS	ADE	4.0 km	MPC · JPL
204073	2003 VS_{7}	—	November 15, 2003	Kitt Peak	Spacewatch	·	2.6 km	MPC · JPL
204074	2003 VR_{11}	—	November 1, 2003	Socorro	LINEAR	·	4.1 km	MPC · JPL
204075	2003 WK	—	November 16, 2003	Catalina	CSS	KOR	2.1 km	MPC · JPL
204076	2003 WX_{15}	—	November 16, 2003	Kitt Peak	Spacewatch	·	2.5 km	MPC · JPL
204077	2003 WK_{16}	—	November 16, 2003	Kitt Peak	Spacewatch	·	2.0 km	MPC · JPL
204078	2003 WX_{16}	—	November 18, 2003	Palomar	NEAT	·	2.9 km	MPC · JPL
204079	2003 WA_{19}	—	November 19, 2003	Socorro	LINEAR	·	3.5 km	MPC · JPL
204080	2003 WX_{26}	—	November 16, 2003	Kitt Peak	Spacewatch	·	2.8 km	MPC · JPL
204081	2003 WX_{27}	—	November 16, 2003	Kitt Peak	Spacewatch	·	2.2 km	MPC · JPL
204082	2003 WK_{32}	—	November 18, 2003	Kitt Peak	Spacewatch	HOF	3.1 km	MPC · JPL
204083	2003 WE_{34}	—	November 19, 2003	Kitt Peak	Spacewatch	·	3.0 km	MPC · JPL
204084	2003 WG_{39}	—	November 19, 2003	Kitt Peak	Spacewatch	EUN	1.9 km	MPC · JPL
204085	2003 WY_{47}	—	November 18, 2003	Kitt Peak	Spacewatch	·	3.6 km	MPC · JPL
204086	2003 WT_{53}	—	November 20, 2003	Socorro	LINEAR	·	3.0 km	MPC · JPL
204087	2003 WU_{54}	—	November 20, 2003	Socorro	LINEAR	·	2.8 km	MPC · JPL
204088	2003 WW_{57}	—	November 18, 2003	Kitt Peak	Spacewatch	·	2.9 km	MPC · JPL
204089	2003 WV_{59}	—	November 18, 2003	Kitt Peak	Spacewatch	KOR	2.3 km	MPC · JPL
204090	2003 WW_{63}	—	November 19, 2003	Kitt Peak	Spacewatch	KOR	1.8 km	MPC · JPL
204091	2003 WX_{69}	—	November 19, 2003	Kitt Peak	Spacewatch	WIT	1.7 km	MPC · JPL
204092	2003 WZ_{69}	—	November 19, 2003	Campo Imperatore	CINEOS	·	2.0 km	MPC · JPL
204093	2003 WX_{70}	—	November 20, 2003	Socorro	LINEAR	·	4.6 km	MPC · JPL
204094	2003 WW_{77}	—	November 20, 2003	Catalina	CSS	·	3.8 km	MPC · JPL
204095	2003 WL_{79}	—	November 20, 2003	Socorro	LINEAR	·	3.3 km	MPC · JPL
204096	2003 WP_{79}	—	November 20, 2003	Socorro	LINEAR	·	4.5 km	MPC · JPL
204097	2003 WD_{80}	—	November 20, 2003	Socorro	LINEAR	(5)	2.0 km	MPC · JPL
204098	2003 WM_{86}	—	November 21, 2003	Socorro	LINEAR	·	3.9 km	MPC · JPL
204099	2003 WC_{99}	—	November 20, 2003	Socorro	LINEAR	·	4.1 km	MPC · JPL
204100	2003 WO_{99}	—	November 20, 2003	Socorro	LINEAR	·	2.0 km	MPC · JPL

== 204101–204200 ==
back to top

Designation			Discovery			Properties		Ref
Permanent	Provisional	Named after	Date	Site	Discoverer(s)	Category	Diam.	Ref
204101	2003 WW_{100}	—	November 21, 2003	Palomar	NEAT	·	4.1 km	MPC · JPL
204102	2003 WG_{106}	—	November 21, 2003	Socorro	LINEAR	·	2.5 km	MPC · JPL
204103	2003 WD_{108}	—	November 20, 2003	Socorro	LINEAR	·	2.0 km	MPC · JPL
204104	2003 WN_{114}	—	November 20, 2003	Socorro	LINEAR	·	2.1 km	MPC · JPL
204105	2003 WR_{114}	—	November 20, 2003	Socorro	LINEAR	·	2.2 km	MPC · JPL
204106	2003 WB_{126}	—	November 20, 2003	Socorro	LINEAR	·	3.4 km	MPC · JPL
204107	2003 WN_{129}	—	November 21, 2003	Socorro	LINEAR	·	3.1 km	MPC · JPL
204108	2003 WJ_{135}	—	November 21, 2003	Socorro	LINEAR	·	1.6 km	MPC · JPL
204109	2003 WV_{140}	—	November 21, 2003	Socorro	LINEAR	·	3.6 km	MPC · JPL
204110	2003 WH_{142}	—	November 21, 2003	Socorro	LINEAR	·	3.9 km	MPC · JPL
204111	2003 WL_{148}	—	November 24, 2003	Kitt Peak	Spacewatch	·	3.1 km	MPC · JPL
204112	2003 WT_{148}	—	November 24, 2003	Anderson Mesa	LONEOS	·	2.5 km	MPC · JPL
204113	2003 WF_{154}	—	November 26, 2003	Socorro	LINEAR	(17392)	2.4 km	MPC · JPL
204114	2003 WW_{154}	—	November 26, 2003	Kitt Peak	Spacewatch	NEM	3.1 km	MPC · JPL
204115	2003 WA_{155}	—	November 26, 2003	Kitt Peak	Spacewatch	BRA	2.7 km	MPC · JPL
204116	2003 WQ_{156}	—	November 29, 2003	Socorro	LINEAR	·	4.4 km	MPC · JPL
204117	2003 WJ_{157}	—	November 24, 2003	Socorro	LINEAR	·	3.2 km	MPC · JPL
204118	2003 WW_{161}	—	November 30, 2003	Socorro	LINEAR	·	4.8 km	MPC · JPL
204119	2003 WY_{163}	—	November 30, 2003	Kitt Peak	Spacewatch	·	2.2 km	MPC · JPL
204120	2003 WM_{166}	—	November 24, 2003	Socorro	LINEAR	H	900 m	MPC · JPL
204121	2003 WB_{192}	—	November 19, 2003	Socorro	LINEAR	·	3.4 km	MPC · JPL
204122	2003 XB_{7}	—	December 3, 2003	Socorro	LINEAR	·	4.3 km	MPC · JPL
204123	2003 XU_{7}	—	December 3, 2003	Socorro	LINEAR	EOS	2.9 km	MPC · JPL
204124	2003 XY_{10}	—	December 10, 2003	Palomar	NEAT	GEF	2.3 km	MPC · JPL
204125	2003 XN_{12}	—	December 14, 2003	Palomar	NEAT	·	4.0 km	MPC · JPL
204126	2003 XF_{19}	—	December 14, 2003	Kitt Peak	Spacewatch	·	3.3 km	MPC · JPL
204127	2003 XM_{25}	—	December 1, 2003	Socorro	LINEAR	MRX	1.8 km	MPC · JPL
204128	2003 XU_{28}	—	December 1, 2003	Kitt Peak	Spacewatch	·	2.0 km	MPC · JPL
204129	2003 XG_{37}	—	December 3, 2003	Socorro	LINEAR	EOS	2.9 km	MPC · JPL
204130	2003 XH_{40}	—	December 14, 2003	Socorro	LINEAR	·	3.8 km	MPC · JPL
204131	2003 YL	—	December 17, 2003	Anderson Mesa	LONEOS	APO	370 m	MPC · JPL
204132	2003 YO_{9}	—	December 17, 2003	Kitt Peak	Spacewatch	·	2.8 km	MPC · JPL
204133	2003 YS_{19}	—	December 17, 2003	Kitt Peak	Spacewatch	BRA	2.1 km	MPC · JPL
204134	2003 YM_{26}	—	December 18, 2003	Kitt Peak	Spacewatch	·	5.2 km	MPC · JPL
204135	2003 YW_{29}	—	December 17, 2003	Palomar	NEAT	·	4.4 km	MPC · JPL
204136	2003 YA_{35}	—	December 18, 2003	Catalina	CSS	slow	7.2 km	MPC · JPL
204137	2003 YV_{40}	—	December 19, 2003	Kitt Peak	Spacewatch	·	2.5 km	MPC · JPL
204138	2003 YU_{46}	—	December 17, 2003	Kitt Peak	Spacewatch	EOS	3.7 km	MPC · JPL
204139	2003 YD_{48}	—	December 18, 2003	Socorro	LINEAR	·	3.6 km	MPC · JPL
204140	2003 YE_{56}	—	December 19, 2003	Socorro	LINEAR	KOR	2.6 km	MPC · JPL
204141	2003 YZ_{63}	—	December 19, 2003	Socorro	LINEAR	·	3.4 km	MPC · JPL
204142	2003 YJ_{64}	—	December 19, 2003	Socorro	LINEAR	·	4.2 km	MPC · JPL
204143	2003 YO_{68}	—	December 19, 2003	Socorro	LINEAR	H	700 m	MPC · JPL
204144	2003 YH_{94}	—	December 21, 2003	Catalina	CSS	LUT	9.5 km	MPC · JPL
204145	2003 YD_{104}	—	December 21, 2003	Socorro	LINEAR	·	5.4 km	MPC · JPL
204146	2003 YH_{104}	—	December 21, 2003	Socorro	LINEAR	·	4.6 km	MPC · JPL
204147	2003 YB_{110}	—	December 23, 2003	Socorro	LINEAR	VER	5.0 km	MPC · JPL
204148	2003 YF_{111}	—	December 21, 2003	Needville	Dillon, W. G., Knewtson, M.	·	3.8 km	MPC · JPL
204149	2003 YG_{113}	—	December 23, 2003	Socorro	LINEAR	JUN	2.2 km	MPC · JPL
204150	2003 YV_{114}	—	December 25, 2003	Haleakala	NEAT	·	5.0 km	MPC · JPL
204151	2003 YY_{127}	—	December 27, 2003	Socorro	LINEAR	EOS	3.4 km	MPC · JPL
204152	2003 YZ_{138}	—	December 27, 2003	Kitt Peak	Spacewatch	·	2.5 km	MPC · JPL
204153	2003 YZ_{168}	—	December 18, 2003	Socorro	LINEAR	EOS	2.7 km	MPC · JPL
204154	2003 YJ_{169}	—	December 18, 2003	Socorro	LINEAR	·	2.9 km	MPC · JPL
204155	2003 YM_{171}	—	December 18, 2003	Kitt Peak	Spacewatch	EOS	3.2 km	MPC · JPL
204156	2004 AD_{4}	—	January 14, 2004	Palomar	NEAT	·	3.9 km	MPC · JPL
204157	2004 AA_{5}	—	January 13, 2004	Anderson Mesa	LONEOS	EOS	3.7 km	MPC · JPL
204158	2004 AT_{13}	—	January 13, 2004	Kitt Peak	Spacewatch	·	4.8 km	MPC · JPL
204159	2004 AO_{15}	—	January 15, 2004	Kitt Peak	Spacewatch	THM	2.8 km	MPC · JPL
204160	2004 BM_{5}	—	January 16, 2004	Kitt Peak	Spacewatch	·	3.1 km	MPC · JPL
204161	2004 BJ_{9}	—	January 16, 2004	Palomar	NEAT	EOS	6.2 km	MPC · JPL
204162	2004 BX_{15}	—	January 18, 2004	Palomar	NEAT	·	2.9 km	MPC · JPL
204163	2004 BH_{17}	—	January 17, 2004	Palomar	NEAT	ELF	5.1 km	MPC · JPL
204164	2004 BW_{19}	—	January 18, 2004	Kitt Peak	Spacewatch	·	3.7 km	MPC · JPL
204165	2004 BW_{25}	—	January 20, 2004	Socorro	LINEAR	·	2.9 km	MPC · JPL
204166	2004 BT_{29}	—	January 18, 2004	Palomar	NEAT	·	3.3 km	MPC · JPL
204167	2004 BP_{31}	—	January 19, 2004	Anderson Mesa	LONEOS	ANF	4.9 km	MPC · JPL
204168	2004 BW_{31}	—	January 19, 2004	Anderson Mesa	LONEOS	·	3.3 km	MPC · JPL
204169	2004 BV_{32}	—	January 19, 2004	Kitt Peak	Spacewatch	THM	4.4 km	MPC · JPL
204170	2004 BC_{33}	—	January 19, 2004	Kitt Peak	Spacewatch	THM	2.5 km	MPC · JPL
204171	2004 BW_{33}	—	January 19, 2004	Kitt Peak	Spacewatch	·	2.4 km	MPC · JPL
204172	2004 BD_{35}	—	January 19, 2004	Kitt Peak	Spacewatch	KOR	1.9 km	MPC · JPL
204173	2004 BL_{35}	—	January 19, 2004	Kitt Peak	Spacewatch	·	2.5 km	MPC · JPL
204174	2004 BH_{37}	—	January 19, 2004	Kitt Peak	Spacewatch	THM	4.8 km	MPC · JPL
204175	2004 BP_{40}	—	January 21, 2004	Socorro	LINEAR	THM	3.3 km	MPC · JPL
204176	2004 BP_{41}	—	January 23, 2004	Anderson Mesa	LONEOS	·	4.0 km	MPC · JPL
204177	2004 BF_{44}	—	January 22, 2004	Socorro	LINEAR	·	4.1 km	MPC · JPL
204178	2004 BO_{49}	—	January 21, 2004	Socorro	LINEAR	·	2.8 km	MPC · JPL
204179	2004 BZ_{49}	—	January 21, 2004	Socorro	LINEAR	·	3.9 km	MPC · JPL
204180	2004 BL_{51}	—	January 21, 2004	Socorro	LINEAR	EOS	3.0 km	MPC · JPL
204181	2004 BL_{52}	—	January 21, 2004	Socorro	LINEAR	·	2.9 km	MPC · JPL
204182	2004 BZ_{52}	—	January 22, 2004	Socorro	LINEAR	·	2.8 km	MPC · JPL
204183	2004 BL_{53}	—	January 22, 2004	Socorro	LINEAR	·	2.1 km	MPC · JPL
204184	2004 BG_{54}	—	January 22, 2004	Socorro	LINEAR	fast	4.8 km	MPC · JPL
204185	2004 BX_{55}	—	January 22, 2004	Socorro	LINEAR	·	2.9 km	MPC · JPL
204186	2004 BC_{56}	—	January 23, 2004	Anderson Mesa	LONEOS	·	5.5 km	MPC · JPL
204187	2004 BN_{58}	—	January 23, 2004	Socorro	LINEAR	DOR	3.4 km	MPC · JPL
204188	2004 BB_{65}	—	January 22, 2004	Socorro	LINEAR	KOR	1.8 km	MPC · JPL
204189	2004 BL_{76}	—	January 24, 2004	Socorro	LINEAR	·	2.3 km	MPC · JPL
204190	2004 BO_{77}	—	January 22, 2004	Socorro	LINEAR	·	3.4 km	MPC · JPL
204191	2004 BW_{79}	—	January 24, 2004	Socorro	LINEAR	HYG	3.8 km	MPC · JPL
204192	2004 BX_{88}	—	January 23, 2004	Socorro	LINEAR	·	3.1 km	MPC · JPL
204193	2004 BB_{90}	—	January 23, 2004	Socorro	LINEAR	·	3.1 km	MPC · JPL
204194	2004 BE_{95}	—	January 28, 2004	Socorro	LINEAR	T_{j} (2.99)	6.4 km	MPC · JPL
204195	2004 BX_{103}	—	January 23, 2004	Socorro	LINEAR	H	1.1 km	MPC · JPL
204196	2004 BU_{107}	—	January 28, 2004	Catalina	CSS	·	3.2 km	MPC · JPL
204197	2004 BE_{121}	—	January 31, 2004	Campo Imperatore	CINEOS	·	3.6 km	MPC · JPL
204198	2004 BG_{137}	—	January 19, 2004	Kitt Peak	Spacewatch	·	2.2 km	MPC · JPL
204199	2004 BW_{143}	—	January 19, 2004	Kitt Peak	Spacewatch	·	2.3 km	MPC · JPL
204200	2004 BY_{147}	—	January 16, 2004	Palomar	NEAT	TEL	1.9 km	MPC · JPL

== 204201–204300 ==
back to top

Designation			Discovery			Properties		Ref
Permanent	Provisional	Named after	Date	Site	Discoverer(s)	Category	Diam.	Ref
204201	2004 BS_{150}	—	January 17, 2004	Haleakala	NEAT	URS	6.0 km	MPC · JPL
204202	2004 CA	—	February 2, 2004	Catalina	CSS	H	750 m	MPC · JPL
204203	2004 CT_{5}	—	February 10, 2004	Catalina	CSS	·	4.1 km	MPC · JPL
204204	2004 CP_{8}	—	February 11, 2004	Kitt Peak	Spacewatch	·	2.7 km	MPC · JPL
204205	2004 CX_{9}	—	February 11, 2004	Catalina	CSS	EOS	3.3 km	MPC · JPL
204206	2004 CC_{14}	—	February 11, 2004	Anderson Mesa	LONEOS	EOS	2.8 km	MPC · JPL
204207	2004 CG_{17}	—	February 11, 2004	Kitt Peak	Spacewatch	·	3.7 km	MPC · JPL
204208	2004 CL_{22}	—	February 11, 2004	Palomar	NEAT	·	4.1 km	MPC · JPL
204209	2004 CO_{29}	—	February 12, 2004	Kitt Peak	Spacewatch	·	3.1 km	MPC · JPL
204210	2004 CU_{42}	—	February 11, 2004	Kitt Peak	Spacewatch	·	3.8 km	MPC · JPL
204211	2004 CX_{42}	—	February 11, 2004	Anderson Mesa	LONEOS	·	4.5 km	MPC · JPL
204212	2004 CL_{44}	—	February 13, 2004	Kitt Peak	Spacewatch	THM	2.7 km	MPC · JPL
204213	2004 CH_{54}	—	February 11, 2004	Kitt Peak	Spacewatch	·	3.6 km	MPC · JPL
204214	2004 CW_{58}	—	February 10, 2004	Palomar	NEAT	·	6.9 km	MPC · JPL
204215	2004 CA_{67}	—	February 15, 2004	Socorro	LINEAR	·	5.5 km	MPC · JPL
204216	2004 CM_{68}	—	February 11, 2004	Palomar	NEAT	·	3.6 km	MPC · JPL
204217	2004 CB_{80}	—	February 11, 2004	Palomar	NEAT	HYG	5.8 km	MPC · JPL
204218	2004 CQ_{80}	—	February 11, 2004	Palomar	NEAT	EOS	3.0 km	MPC · JPL
204219	2004 CY_{82}	—	February 12, 2004	Palomar	NEAT	·	4.4 km	MPC · JPL
204220	2004 CJ_{85}	—	February 14, 2004	Kitt Peak	Spacewatch	·	3.1 km	MPC · JPL
204221	2004 CO_{85}	—	February 14, 2004	Kitt Peak	Spacewatch	THM	4.3 km	MPC · JPL
204222	2004 CF_{88}	—	February 11, 2004	Kitt Peak	Spacewatch	·	3.6 km	MPC · JPL
204223	2004 CS_{90}	—	February 12, 2004	Palomar	NEAT	HYG	5.7 km	MPC · JPL
204224	2004 CZ_{92}	—	February 15, 2004	Socorro	LINEAR	·	2.8 km	MPC · JPL
204225	2004 CX_{98}	—	February 14, 2004	Catalina	CSS	·	4.1 km	MPC · JPL
204226	2004 CK_{102}	—	February 12, 2004	Palomar	NEAT	·	3.2 km	MPC · JPL
204227	2004 CA_{113}	—	February 13, 2004	Anderson Mesa	LONEOS	·	4.4 km	MPC · JPL
204228	2004 CB_{114}	—	February 13, 2004	Anderson Mesa	LONEOS	·	5.1 km	MPC · JPL
204229	2004 CD_{116}	—	February 11, 2004	Kitt Peak	Spacewatch	·	5.5 km	MPC · JPL
204230	2004 CV_{128}	—	February 14, 2004	Kitt Peak	Spacewatch	·	3.2 km	MPC · JPL
204231	2004 CC_{129}	—	February 14, 2004	Kitt Peak	Spacewatch	·	3.0 km	MPC · JPL
204232	2004 DG_{2}	—	February 19, 2004	Socorro	LINEAR	APO	730 m	MPC · JPL
204233	2004 DA_{7}	—	February 16, 2004	Kitt Peak	Spacewatch	·	2.8 km	MPC · JPL
204234	2004 DZ_{17}	—	February 18, 2004	Socorro	LINEAR	·	4.4 km	MPC · JPL
204235	2004 DQ_{30}	—	February 17, 2004	Socorro	LINEAR	THB	4.5 km	MPC · JPL
204236	2004 DB_{33}	—	February 18, 2004	Socorro	LINEAR	·	2.8 km	MPC · JPL
204237	2004 DR_{33}	—	February 18, 2004	Socorro	LINEAR	·	4.6 km	MPC · JPL
204238	2004 DS_{33}	—	February 18, 2004	Socorro	LINEAR	THM	3.6 km	MPC · JPL
204239	2004 DS_{39}	—	February 23, 2004	Socorro	LINEAR	H	970 m	MPC · JPL
204240	2004 DL_{42}	—	February 19, 2004	Socorro	LINEAR	BRA	2.4 km	MPC · JPL
204241	2004 DU_{48}	—	February 19, 2004	Socorro	LINEAR	THM	4.8 km	MPC · JPL
204242	2004 DV_{48}	—	February 19, 2004	Socorro	LINEAR	·	2.8 km	MPC · JPL
204243	2004 DH_{50}	—	February 22, 2004	Kitt Peak	Spacewatch	·	4.9 km	MPC · JPL
204244	2004 DN_{54}	—	February 22, 2004	Kitt Peak	Spacewatch	·	4.5 km	MPC · JPL
204245	2004 DT_{54}	—	February 22, 2004	Kitt Peak	Spacewatch	·	4.3 km	MPC · JPL
204246	2004 DQ_{56}	—	February 22, 2004	Kitt Peak	Spacewatch	·	4.1 km	MPC · JPL
204247	2004 DC_{58}	—	February 23, 2004	Socorro	LINEAR	THM	2.9 km	MPC · JPL
204248	2004 EG_{1}	—	March 14, 2004	Socorro	LINEAR	H	920 m	MPC · JPL
204249	2004 EU_{4}	—	March 11, 2004	Palomar	NEAT	THM	3.6 km	MPC · JPL
204250	2004 EH_{26}	—	March 14, 2004	Kitt Peak	Spacewatch	·	3.3 km	MPC · JPL
204251	2004 EQ_{28}	—	March 15, 2004	Kitt Peak	Spacewatch	·	2.7 km	MPC · JPL
204252	2004 EA_{38}	—	March 14, 2004	Palomar	NEAT	·	3.6 km	MPC · JPL
204253	2004 EB_{39}	—	March 14, 2004	Palomar	NEAT	·	5.4 km	MPC · JPL
204254	2004 ET_{54}	—	March 14, 2004	Palomar	NEAT	TIR	4.5 km	MPC · JPL
204255	2004 EB_{57}	—	March 15, 2004	Palomar	NEAT	·	3.3 km	MPC · JPL
204256	2004 EW_{68}	—	March 15, 2004	Socorro	LINEAR	TIR	4.8 km	MPC · JPL
204257	2004 EL_{74}	—	March 13, 2004	Palomar	NEAT	THM	4.7 km	MPC · JPL
204258	2004 EL_{84}	—	March 15, 2004	Catalina	CSS	·	4.0 km	MPC · JPL
204259	2004 EZ_{84}	—	March 15, 2004	Catalina	CSS	·	4.7 km	MPC · JPL
204260	2004 FA_{1}	—	March 17, 2004	Mount Graham	Ryan, W. H., Martinez, C. T.	·	4.2 km	MPC · JPL
204261	2004 FH_{16}	—	March 26, 2004	Socorro	LINEAR	·	6.6 km	MPC · JPL
204262	2004 FZ_{21}	—	March 16, 2004	Socorro	LINEAR	·	3.0 km	MPC · JPL
204263	2004 FG_{30}	—	March 19, 2004	Catalina	CSS	·	5.7 km	MPC · JPL
204264	2004 FL_{31}	—	March 17, 2004	Palomar	NEAT	H	1.1 km	MPC · JPL
204265	2004 FG_{32}	—	March 30, 2004	Socorro	LINEAR	T_{j} (2.98)	4.7 km	MPC · JPL
204266	2004 FC_{33}	—	March 16, 2004	Catalina	CSS	·	3.9 km	MPC · JPL
204267	2004 FD_{38}	—	March 17, 2004	Socorro	LINEAR	·	4.0 km	MPC · JPL
204268	2004 FZ_{48}	—	March 18, 2004	Socorro	LINEAR	·	5.6 km	MPC · JPL
204269	2004 FQ_{83}	—	March 18, 2004	Catalina	CSS	·	4.6 km	MPC · JPL
204270	2004 FJ_{92}	—	March 18, 2004	Socorro	LINEAR	THM	4.4 km	MPC · JPL
204271	2004 FP_{102}	—	March 22, 2004	Socorro	LINEAR	·	5.8 km	MPC · JPL
204272	2004 FV_{119}	—	March 23, 2004	Socorro	LINEAR	THM	2.8 km	MPC · JPL
204273	2004 FP_{130}	—	March 22, 2004	Anderson Mesa	LONEOS	·	3.2 km	MPC · JPL
204274	2004 FL_{142}	—	March 27, 2004	Socorro	LINEAR	CYB	8.8 km	MPC · JPL
204275	2004 FD_{144}	—	March 29, 2004	Catalina	CSS	·	6.7 km	MPC · JPL
204276	2004 FU_{145}	—	March 30, 2004	Kitt Peak	Spacewatch	·	3.6 km	MPC · JPL
204277	2004 GJ_{19}	—	April 14, 2004	Socorro	LINEAR	H	970 m	MPC · JPL
204278	2004 HG_{1}	—	April 17, 2004	Socorro	LINEAR	H	870 m	MPC · JPL
204279	2004 HV_{5}	—	April 17, 2004	Socorro	LINEAR	·	2.8 km	MPC · JPL
204280	2004 HJ_{34}	—	April 17, 2004	Socorro	LINEAR	·	1.2 km	MPC · JPL
204281	2004 HL_{50}	—	April 23, 2004	Catalina	CSS	·	6.7 km	MPC · JPL
204282	2004 KR_{16}	—	May 27, 2004	Kitt Peak	Spacewatch	·	980 m	MPC · JPL
204283	2004 LY_{8}	—	June 12, 2004	Catalina	CSS	·	1.5 km	MPC · JPL
204284	2004 LX_{14}	—	June 11, 2004	Palomar	NEAT	·	800 m	MPC · JPL
204285	2004 LM_{23}	—	June 15, 2004	Socorro	LINEAR	·	1.4 km	MPC · JPL
204286	2004 ME_{1}	—	June 16, 2004	Socorro	LINEAR	·	1.4 km	MPC · JPL
204287	2004 NK_{13}	—	July 11, 2004	Socorro	LINEAR	·	1.0 km	MPC · JPL
204288	2004 OH_{5}	—	July 16, 2004	Socorro	LINEAR	·	1.0 km	MPC · JPL
204289	2004 PP_{3}	—	August 3, 2004	Siding Spring	SSS	·	1.1 km	MPC · JPL
204290	2004 PV_{21}	—	August 8, 2004	Palomar	NEAT	·	1.1 km	MPC · JPL
204291	2004 PH_{27}	—	August 8, 2004	Reedy Creek	J. Broughton	·	1.4 km	MPC · JPL
204292	2004 PR_{33}	—	August 8, 2004	Anderson Mesa	LONEOS	·	1.0 km	MPC · JPL
204293	2004 PD_{34}	—	August 8, 2004	Anderson Mesa	LONEOS	·	1.4 km	MPC · JPL
204294	2004 PA_{39}	—	August 9, 2004	Socorro	LINEAR	·	1.6 km	MPC · JPL
204295	2004 PO_{45}	—	August 7, 2004	Palomar	NEAT	NYS	1.2 km	MPC · JPL
204296	2004 PT_{61}	—	August 9, 2004	Socorro	LINEAR	·	1.1 km	MPC · JPL
204297	2004 PV_{61}	—	August 9, 2004	Socorro	LINEAR	·	1.9 km	MPC · JPL
204298	2004 PR_{63}	—	August 10, 2004	Socorro	LINEAR	NYS	1.6 km	MPC · JPL
204299	2004 PM_{72}	—	August 8, 2004	Socorro	LINEAR	·	1.1 km	MPC · JPL
204300	2004 PT_{79}	—	August 9, 2004	Anderson Mesa	LONEOS	·	1.1 km	MPC · JPL

== 204301–204400 ==
back to top

Designation			Discovery			Properties		Ref
Permanent	Provisional	Named after	Date	Site	Discoverer(s)	Category	Diam.	Ref
204301	2004 PU_{84}	—	August 10, 2004	Socorro	LINEAR	MAS	1.1 km	MPC · JPL
204302	2004 PG_{85}	—	August 10, 2004	Socorro	LINEAR	·	1.2 km	MPC · JPL
204303	2004 PK_{88}	—	August 11, 2004	Socorro	LINEAR	ERI	2.6 km	MPC · JPL
204304	2004 PW_{90}	—	August 10, 2004	Socorro	LINEAR	NYS	1.7 km	MPC · JPL
204305	2004 PM_{91}	—	August 11, 2004	Socorro	LINEAR	NYS	1.3 km	MPC · JPL
204306	2004 PE_{98}	—	August 15, 2004	Reedy Creek	J. Broughton	·	1.0 km	MPC · JPL
204307	2004 PG_{99}	—	August 9, 2004	Socorro	LINEAR	·	1.2 km	MPC · JPL
204308	2004 PN_{100}	—	August 12, 2004	Socorro	LINEAR	NYS	1.5 km	MPC · JPL
204309	2004 RQ_{3}	—	September 4, 2004	Palomar	NEAT	·	2.2 km	MPC · JPL
204310	2004 RX_{20}	—	September 7, 2004	Kitt Peak	Spacewatch	NYS	1.2 km	MPC · JPL
204311	2004 RH_{29}	—	September 7, 2004	Socorro	LINEAR	NYS	1.4 km	MPC · JPL
204312	2004 RG_{30}	—	September 7, 2004	Socorro	LINEAR	NYS	1.3 km	MPC · JPL
204313	2004 RL_{32}	—	September 7, 2004	Socorro	LINEAR	·	1.3 km	MPC · JPL
204314	2004 RA_{33}	—	September 7, 2004	Socorro	LINEAR	·	1.2 km	MPC · JPL
204315	2004 RN_{34}	—	September 7, 2004	Socorro	LINEAR	·	1.5 km	MPC · JPL
204316	2004 RX_{46}	—	September 8, 2004	Socorro	LINEAR	NYS	1.3 km	MPC · JPL
204317	2004 RB_{53}	—	September 8, 2004	Socorro	LINEAR	MAS	920 m	MPC · JPL
204318	2004 RM_{66}	—	September 8, 2004	Socorro	LINEAR	·	1.3 km	MPC · JPL
204319	2004 RU_{66}	—	September 8, 2004	Socorro	LINEAR	NYS	1.3 km	MPC · JPL
204320	2004 RN_{75}	—	September 8, 2004	Socorro	LINEAR	·	1.5 km	MPC · JPL
204321	2004 RC_{81}	—	September 8, 2004	Socorro	LINEAR	·	1.2 km	MPC · JPL
204322	2004 RP_{81}	—	September 8, 2004	Socorro	LINEAR	·	1.4 km	MPC · JPL
204323	2004 RL_{82}	—	September 9, 2004	Socorro	LINEAR	·	1.3 km	MPC · JPL
204324	2004 RU_{88}	—	September 8, 2004	Socorro	LINEAR	·	1.0 km	MPC · JPL
204325	2004 RE_{101}	—	September 8, 2004	Socorro	LINEAR	·	1.1 km	MPC · JPL
204326	2004 RY_{105}	—	September 8, 2004	Palomar	NEAT	V	1.2 km	MPC · JPL
204327	2004 RN_{106}	—	September 8, 2004	Palomar	NEAT	·	3.5 km	MPC · JPL
204328	2004 RF_{132}	—	September 7, 2004	Kitt Peak	Spacewatch	·	910 m	MPC · JPL
204329	2004 RJ_{175}	—	September 10, 2004	Socorro	LINEAR	·	1.5 km	MPC · JPL
204330	2004 RC_{183}	—	September 10, 2004	Socorro	LINEAR	·	1.6 km	MPC · JPL
204331	2004 RU_{186}	—	September 10, 2004	Socorro	LINEAR	·	1.6 km	MPC · JPL
204332	2004 RJ_{211}	—	September 11, 2004	Socorro	LINEAR	·	980 m	MPC · JPL
204333	2004 RD_{228}	—	September 9, 2004	Kitt Peak	Spacewatch	(5)	1.4 km	MPC · JPL
204334	2004 RW_{233}	—	September 9, 2004	Kitt Peak	Spacewatch	·	1.1 km	MPC · JPL
204335	2004 RM_{234}	—	September 10, 2004	Socorro	LINEAR	·	970 m	MPC · JPL
204336	2004 RD_{236}	—	September 10, 2004	Socorro	LINEAR	·	1.5 km	MPC · JPL
204337	2004 RJ_{251}	—	September 14, 2004	Palomar	NEAT	·	1.3 km	MPC · JPL
204338	2004 RF_{253}	—	September 15, 2004	Three Buttes	Jones, G. R.	·	1.0 km	MPC · JPL
204339	2004 RX_{254}	—	September 6, 2004	Palomar	NEAT	·	2.1 km	MPC · JPL
204340	2004 RX_{287}	—	September 15, 2004	7300	W. K. Y. Yeung	·	1.6 km	MPC · JPL
204341	2004 RH_{315}	—	September 15, 2004	Kitt Peak	Spacewatch	MAS	1.0 km	MPC · JPL
204342	2004 RB_{316}	—	September 7, 2004	Bergisch Gladbach	W. Bickel	·	1.2 km	MPC · JPL
204343	2004 RU_{319}	—	September 13, 2004	Socorro	LINEAR	·	1.9 km	MPC · JPL
204344	2004 RF_{324}	—	September 13, 2004	Socorro	LINEAR	·	1.8 km	MPC · JPL
204345	2004 RD_{325}	—	September 13, 2004	Socorro	LINEAR	·	1.8 km	MPC · JPL
204346	2004 RR_{339}	—	September 8, 2004	Socorro	LINEAR	NYS	990 m	MPC · JPL
204347	2004 RG_{341}	—	September 11, 2004	Socorro	LINEAR	·	2.8 km	MPC · JPL
204348	2004 RX_{345}	—	September 8, 2004	Socorro	LINEAR	PHO	1.2 km	MPC · JPL
204349	2004 SF_{23}	—	September 17, 2004	Kitt Peak	Spacewatch	·	970 m	MPC · JPL
204350	2004 SR_{29}	—	September 17, 2004	Socorro	LINEAR	·	990 m	MPC · JPL
204351	2004 SG_{39}	—	September 17, 2004	Socorro	LINEAR	·	2.0 km	MPC · JPL
204352	2004 SV_{39}	—	September 17, 2004	Socorro	LINEAR	MAS	840 m	MPC · JPL
204353	2004 SB_{47}	—	September 18, 2004	Socorro	LINEAR	·	2.7 km	MPC · JPL
204354	2004 SR_{53}	—	September 22, 2004	Socorro	LINEAR	·	1.4 km	MPC · JPL
204355	2004 TH_{6}	—	October 2, 2004	Palomar	NEAT	·	1.9 km	MPC · JPL
204356	2004 TP_{6}	—	October 3, 2004	Palomar	NEAT	·	1.8 km	MPC · JPL
204357	2004 TS_{6}	—	October 3, 2004	Palomar	NEAT	·	2.5 km	MPC · JPL
204358	2004 TC_{9}	—	October 4, 2004	Anderson Mesa	LONEOS	·	1.2 km	MPC · JPL
204359	2004 TM_{9}	—	October 6, 2004	Yamagata	Yamagata	NYS	1.6 km	MPC · JPL
204360	2004 TX_{14}	—	October 5, 2004	Goodricke-Pigott	R. A. Tucker	·	1.7 km	MPC · JPL
204361	2004 TB_{30}	—	October 4, 2004	Kitt Peak	Spacewatch	·	2.8 km	MPC · JPL
204362	2004 TW_{33}	—	October 4, 2004	Anderson Mesa	LONEOS	·	1.4 km	MPC · JPL
204363	2004 TS_{34}	—	October 4, 2004	Anderson Mesa	LONEOS	·	1.5 km	MPC · JPL
204364	2004 TE_{36}	—	October 4, 2004	Anderson Mesa	LONEOS	·	980 m	MPC · JPL
204365	2004 TP_{37}	—	October 4, 2004	Kitt Peak	Spacewatch	·	2.0 km	MPC · JPL
204366	2004 TK_{44}	—	October 4, 2004	Kitt Peak	Spacewatch	EUN	1.6 km	MPC · JPL
204367	2004 TA_{57}	—	October 5, 2004	Kitt Peak	Spacewatch	MAS	890 m	MPC · JPL
204368	2004 TT_{68}	—	October 5, 2004	Anderson Mesa	LONEOS	V	1.0 km	MPC · JPL
204369	2004 TD_{69}	—	October 5, 2004	Anderson Mesa	LONEOS	·	1.5 km	MPC · JPL
204370 Ferdinandvaněk	2004 TH_{70}	Ferdinandvaněk	October 5, 2004	Kleť	KLENOT	·	1.8 km	MPC · JPL
204371	2004 TE_{75}	—	October 6, 2004	Kitt Peak	Spacewatch	MAS	900 m	MPC · JPL
204372	2004 TG_{79}	—	October 4, 2004	Anderson Mesa	LONEOS	·	2.3 km	MPC · JPL
204373	2004 TP_{93}	—	October 5, 2004	Kitt Peak	Spacewatch	NYS	1.5 km	MPC · JPL
204374	2004 TT_{94}	—	October 5, 2004	Kitt Peak	Spacewatch	·	1.2 km	MPC · JPL
204375	2004 TY_{94}	—	October 5, 2004	Kitt Peak	Spacewatch	·	1.5 km	MPC · JPL
204376	2004 TV_{103}	—	October 7, 2004	Anderson Mesa	LONEOS	·	1.2 km	MPC · JPL
204377	2004 TG_{108}	—	October 7, 2004	Socorro	LINEAR	(2076)	1.0 km	MPC · JPL
204378	2004 TL_{115}	—	October 9, 2004	Anderson Mesa	LONEOS	·	1.4 km	MPC · JPL
204379	2004 TB_{121}	—	October 6, 2004	Palomar	NEAT	·	2.6 km	MPC · JPL
204380	2004 TR_{121}	—	October 7, 2004	Anderson Mesa	LONEOS	CLA	2.2 km	MPC · JPL
204381	2004 TO_{122}	—	October 7, 2004	Anderson Mesa	LONEOS	·	1.2 km	MPC · JPL
204382	2004 TU_{125}	—	October 7, 2004	Socorro	LINEAR	V	1.0 km	MPC · JPL
204383	2004 TG_{126}	—	October 7, 2004	Socorro	LINEAR	NYS	1.6 km	MPC · JPL
204384	2004 TW_{127}	—	October 7, 2004	Socorro	LINEAR	·	2.1 km	MPC · JPL
204385	2004 TL_{131}	—	October 7, 2004	Anderson Mesa	LONEOS	(5)	2.3 km	MPC · JPL
204386	2004 TK_{143}	—	October 4, 2004	Kitt Peak	Spacewatch	·	1.6 km	MPC · JPL
204387	2004 TR_{143}	—	October 4, 2004	Kitt Peak	Spacewatch	·	1.6 km	MPC · JPL
204388	2004 TV_{143}	—	October 4, 2004	Kitt Peak	Spacewatch	NYS	1.5 km	MPC · JPL
204389	2004 TN_{147}	—	October 6, 2004	Kitt Peak	Spacewatch	·	1.4 km	MPC · JPL
204390	2004 TV_{183}	—	October 7, 2004	Kitt Peak	Spacewatch	·	1.5 km	MPC · JPL
204391	2004 TX_{221}	—	October 7, 2004	Socorro	LINEAR	·	1.8 km	MPC · JPL
204392	2004 TY_{246}	—	October 7, 2004	Socorro	LINEAR	NYS	1.5 km	MPC · JPL
204393	2004 TY_{263}	—	October 9, 2004	Kitt Peak	Spacewatch	·	1.5 km	MPC · JPL
204394	2004 TG_{269}	—	October 9, 2004	Kitt Peak	Spacewatch	·	1.8 km	MPC · JPL
204395	2004 TE_{275}	—	October 9, 2004	Kitt Peak	Spacewatch	·	1.2 km	MPC · JPL
204396	2004 TE_{281}	—	October 10, 2004	Kitt Peak	Spacewatch	·	1.3 km	MPC · JPL
204397	2004 TY_{287}	—	October 9, 2004	Kitt Peak	Spacewatch	·	1.6 km	MPC · JPL
204398	2004 TE_{296}	—	October 10, 2004	Kitt Peak	Spacewatch	·	1.2 km	MPC · JPL
204399	2004 TT_{296}	—	October 10, 2004	Kitt Peak	Spacewatch	NYS	1.3 km	MPC · JPL
204400	2004 TX_{296}	—	October 10, 2004	Kitt Peak	Spacewatch	·	1.2 km	MPC · JPL

== 204401–204500 ==
back to top

Designation			Discovery			Properties		Ref
Permanent	Provisional	Named after	Date	Site	Discoverer(s)	Category	Diam.	Ref
204401	2004 TS_{329}	—	October 9, 2004	Kitt Peak	Spacewatch	·	760 m	MPC · JPL
204402	2004 UU_{9}	—	October 19, 2004	Socorro	LINEAR	·	2.7 km	MPC · JPL
204403	2004 VT	—	November 2, 2004	Anderson Mesa	LONEOS	·	2.5 km	MPC · JPL
204404	2004 VJ_{2}	—	November 3, 2004	Palomar	NEAT	·	1.0 km	MPC · JPL
204405	2004 VQ_{3}	—	November 3, 2004	Kitt Peak	Spacewatch	·	1.3 km	MPC · JPL
204406	2004 VA_{4}	—	November 3, 2004	Palomar	NEAT	·	1.6 km	MPC · JPL
204407	2004 VT_{8}	—	November 3, 2004	Anderson Mesa	LONEOS	·	1.5 km	MPC · JPL
204408	2004 VT_{14}	—	November 4, 2004	Catalina	CSS	·	1.8 km	MPC · JPL
204409	2004 VL_{15}	—	November 4, 2004	Needville	J. Dellinger, Wells, D.	·	1.4 km	MPC · JPL
204410	2004 VP_{31}	—	November 3, 2004	Kitt Peak	Spacewatch	V	1.1 km	MPC · JPL
204411	2004 VB_{34}	—	November 3, 2004	Kitt Peak	Spacewatch	NYS	1.6 km	MPC · JPL
204412	2004 VS_{39}	—	November 4, 2004	Kitt Peak	Spacewatch	NYS	1.5 km	MPC · JPL
204413	2004 VH_{42}	—	November 4, 2004	Kitt Peak	Spacewatch	·	1.0 km	MPC · JPL
204414	2004 VP_{44}	—	November 4, 2004	Kitt Peak	Spacewatch	·	1.5 km	MPC · JPL
204415	2004 VP_{51}	—	November 4, 2004	Kitt Peak	Spacewatch	·	2.9 km	MPC · JPL
204416	2004 VC_{53}	—	November 5, 2004	Campo Imperatore	CINEOS	·	1.3 km	MPC · JPL
204417	2004 VT_{56}	—	November 4, 2004	Catalina	CSS	·	1.2 km	MPC · JPL
204418	2004 VR_{57}	—	November 7, 2004	Socorro	LINEAR	·	1.4 km	MPC · JPL
204419	2004 VU_{61}	—	November 5, 2004	Campo Imperatore	CINEOS	·	1.8 km	MPC · JPL
204420	2004 VX_{62}	—	November 7, 2004	Socorro	LINEAR	·	1.7 km	MPC · JPL
204421	2004 VF_{63}	—	November 10, 2004	Kitt Peak	Spacewatch	·	1.5 km	MPC · JPL
204422	2004 VC_{69}	—	November 10, 2004	Kitt Peak	Spacewatch	·	2.3 km	MPC · JPL
204423	2004 VP_{74}	—	November 15, 2004	Cordell-Lorenz	D. T. Durig	V	910 m	MPC · JPL
204424	2004 VR_{74}	—	November 12, 2004	Catalina	CSS	NYS	1.6 km	MPC · JPL
204425	2004 WM_{3}	—	November 17, 2004	Campo Imperatore	CINEOS	MAS	940 m	MPC · JPL
204426	2004 WC_{7}	—	November 19, 2004	Socorro	LINEAR	·	1.8 km	MPC · JPL
204427	2004 XC_{10}	—	December 2, 2004	Palomar	NEAT	·	1.5 km	MPC · JPL
204428	2004 XN_{13}	—	December 8, 2004	Socorro	LINEAR	NYS	1.6 km	MPC · JPL
204429	2004 XF_{17}	—	December 3, 2004	Kitt Peak	Spacewatch	·	2.6 km	MPC · JPL
204430	2004 XA_{19}	—	December 8, 2004	Socorro	LINEAR	·	1.8 km	MPC · JPL
204431	2004 XW_{28}	—	December 10, 2004	Kitt Peak	Spacewatch	·	2.5 km	MPC · JPL
204432	2004 XN_{41}	—	December 11, 2004	Campo Imperatore	CINEOS	PHO	1.6 km	MPC · JPL
204433	2004 XV_{44}	—	December 11, 2004	Campo Imperatore	CINEOS	·	1.7 km	MPC · JPL
204434	2004 XN_{48}	—	December 10, 2004	Kitt Peak	Spacewatch	·	2.0 km	MPC · JPL
204435	2004 XB_{49}	—	December 11, 2004	Socorro	LINEAR	·	2.6 km	MPC · JPL
204436	2004 XL_{59}	—	December 11, 2004	Kitt Peak	Spacewatch	·	1.9 km	MPC · JPL
204437	2004 XC_{69}	—	December 9, 2004	Vail-Jarnac	Jarnac	·	1.9 km	MPC · JPL
204438	2004 XY_{76}	—	December 10, 2004	Socorro	LINEAR	NYS	1.5 km	MPC · JPL
204439	2004 XT_{81}	—	December 10, 2004	Kitt Peak	Spacewatch	·	1.7 km	MPC · JPL
204440	2004 XP_{85}	—	December 12, 2004	Catalina	CSS	·	2.8 km	MPC · JPL
204441	2004 XJ_{88}	—	December 10, 2004	Socorro	LINEAR	(5)	1.5 km	MPC · JPL
204442	2004 XW_{106}	—	December 11, 2004	Socorro	LINEAR	·	3.5 km	MPC · JPL
204443	2004 XB_{108}	—	December 11, 2004	Socorro	LINEAR	·	2.3 km	MPC · JPL
204444	2004 XG_{108}	—	December 11, 2004	Socorro	LINEAR	·	3.9 km	MPC · JPL
204445	2004 XA_{119}	—	December 12, 2004	Kitt Peak	Spacewatch	·	2.2 km	MPC · JPL
204446	2004 XP_{119}	—	December 12, 2004	Kitt Peak	Spacewatch	(5)	1.6 km	MPC · JPL
204447	2004 XP_{122}	—	December 9, 2004	Kitt Peak	Spacewatch	·	1.6 km	MPC · JPL
204448	2004 XY_{122}	—	December 10, 2004	Socorro	LINEAR	NYS	1.7 km	MPC · JPL
204449	2004 XC_{132}	—	December 11, 2004	Socorro	LINEAR	PHO	1.7 km	MPC · JPL
204450	2004 XJ_{137}	—	December 15, 2004	Socorro	LINEAR	(5)	3.2 km	MPC · JPL
204451	2004 XA_{140}	—	December 13, 2004	Kitt Peak	Spacewatch	·	3.0 km	MPC · JPL
204452	2004 XO_{143}	—	December 9, 2004	Kitt Peak	Spacewatch	NYS	1.6 km	MPC · JPL
204453	2004 XD_{155}	—	December 15, 2004	Kitt Peak	Spacewatch	·	1.6 km	MPC · JPL
204454	2004 XH_{171}	—	December 10, 2004	Kitt Peak	Spacewatch	·	3.1 km	MPC · JPL
204455	2004 YJ_{6}	—	December 18, 2004	Mount Lemmon	Mount Lemmon Survey	·	2.0 km	MPC · JPL
204456	2004 YJ_{13}	—	December 18, 2004	Mount Lemmon	Mount Lemmon Survey	MAS	1.1 km	MPC · JPL
204457	2004 YM_{13}	—	December 18, 2004	Mount Lemmon	Mount Lemmon Survey	·	2.0 km	MPC · JPL
204458	2004 YT_{14}	—	December 18, 2004	Mount Lemmon	Mount Lemmon Survey	GAL	3.4 km	MPC · JPL
204459	2004 YB_{15}	—	December 18, 2004	Mount Lemmon	Mount Lemmon Survey	·	2.0 km	MPC · JPL
204460	2004 YV_{17}	—	December 18, 2004	Mount Lemmon	Mount Lemmon Survey	·	1.8 km	MPC · JPL
204461	2004 YR_{25}	—	December 18, 2004	Mount Lemmon	Mount Lemmon Survey	·	3.9 km	MPC · JPL
204462	2004 YA_{30}	—	December 16, 2004	Kitt Peak	Spacewatch	·	2.3 km	MPC · JPL
204463	2005 AL_{14}	—	January 7, 2005	Socorro	LINEAR	·	2.5 km	MPC · JPL
204464	2005 AR_{18}	—	January 8, 2005	Socorro	LINEAR	·	2.4 km	MPC · JPL
204465	2005 AX_{20}	—	January 6, 2005	Socorro	LINEAR	·	1.8 km	MPC · JPL
204466	2005 AE_{22}	—	January 6, 2005	Socorro	LINEAR	·	2.2 km	MPC · JPL
204467	2005 AH_{24}	—	January 7, 2005	Catalina	CSS	·	2.9 km	MPC · JPL
204468	2005 AE_{25}	—	January 8, 2005	Campo Imperatore	CINEOS	·	1.6 km	MPC · JPL
204469	2005 AZ_{25}	—	January 11, 2005	Socorro	LINEAR	·	2.1 km	MPC · JPL
204470	2005 AU_{26}	—	January 13, 2005	Catalina	CSS	·	2.1 km	MPC · JPL
204471	2005 AV_{31}	—	January 11, 2005	Socorro	LINEAR	·	2.3 km	MPC · JPL
204472	2005 AK_{32}	—	January 11, 2005	Socorro	LINEAR	·	2.3 km	MPC · JPL
204473	2005 AD_{36}	—	January 13, 2005	Socorro	LINEAR	·	4.4 km	MPC · JPL
204474	2005 AV_{38}	—	January 13, 2005	Catalina	CSS	·	2.0 km	MPC · JPL
204475	2005 AC_{40}	—	January 15, 2005	Socorro	LINEAR	·	2.5 km	MPC · JPL
204476	2005 AG_{47}	—	January 13, 2005	Kitt Peak	Spacewatch	AEO	1.3 km	MPC · JPL
204477	2005 AF_{48}	—	January 13, 2005	Kitt Peak	Spacewatch	·	2.3 km	MPC · JPL
204478	2005 AS_{54}	—	January 15, 2005	Catalina	CSS	HNS	2.5 km	MPC · JPL
204479	2005 AW_{54}	—	January 15, 2005	Socorro	LINEAR	(5)	2.4 km	MPC · JPL
204480	2005 AP_{57}	—	January 15, 2005	Catalina	CSS	KRM	3.6 km	MPC · JPL
204481	2005 AS_{61}	—	January 15, 2005	Kitt Peak	Spacewatch	MRX	1.5 km	MPC · JPL
204482	2005 AM_{67}	—	January 13, 2005	Mayhill	Lowe, A.	·	1.9 km	MPC · JPL
204483	2005 AZ_{67}	—	January 13, 2005	Kitt Peak	Spacewatch	·	3.5 km	MPC · JPL
204484	2005 AB_{76}	—	January 15, 2005	Anderson Mesa	LONEOS	·	2.4 km	MPC · JPL
204485	2005 AU_{77}	—	January 15, 2005	Kitt Peak	Spacewatch	·	1.8 km	MPC · JPL
204486	2005 AE_{78}	—	January 15, 2005	Kitt Peak	Spacewatch	·	2.0 km	MPC · JPL
204487	2005 BJ_{4}	—	January 16, 2005	Kitt Peak	Spacewatch	(5)	1.5 km	MPC · JPL
204488	2005 BB_{10}	—	January 16, 2005	Socorro	LINEAR	·	2.2 km	MPC · JPL
204489	2005 BL_{13}	—	January 17, 2005	Kitt Peak	Spacewatch	ADE	2.7 km	MPC · JPL
204490	2005 BO_{22}	—	January 16, 2005	Kitt Peak	Spacewatch	·	1.7 km	MPC · JPL
204491	2005 BR_{28}	—	January 31, 2005	Palomar	NEAT	·	1.7 km	MPC · JPL
204492	2005 BG_{29}	—	January 31, 2005	Goodricke-Pigott	R. A. Tucker	·	1.9 km	MPC · JPL
204493	2005 CJ_{1}	—	February 1, 2005	Catalina	CSS	·	2.2 km	MPC · JPL
204494	2005 CN_{2}	—	February 1, 2005	Catalina	CSS	·	1.8 km	MPC · JPL
204495	2005 CC_{3}	—	February 1, 2005	Catalina	CSS	·	2.2 km	MPC · JPL
204496	2005 CH_{4}	—	February 1, 2005	Kitt Peak	Spacewatch	PHO	1.8 km	MPC · JPL
204497	2005 CP_{16}	—	February 2, 2005	Socorro	LINEAR	·	2.3 km	MPC · JPL
204498	2005 CM_{19}	—	February 2, 2005	Catalina	CSS	·	2.6 km	MPC · JPL
204499	2005 CB_{27}	—	February 1, 2005	Kitt Peak	Spacewatch	·	2.3 km	MPC · JPL
204500	2005 CK_{27}	—	February 2, 2005	Socorro	LINEAR	·	2.2 km	MPC · JPL

== 204501–204600 ==
back to top

Designation			Discovery			Properties		Ref
Permanent	Provisional	Named after	Date	Site	Discoverer(s)	Category	Diam.	Ref
204501	2005 CK_{31}	—	February 1, 2005	Kitt Peak	Spacewatch	·	2.1 km	MPC · JPL
204502	2005 CE_{36}	—	February 3, 2005	Socorro	LINEAR	NEM	3.0 km	MPC · JPL
204503	2005 CB_{37}	—	February 6, 2005	Palomar	NEAT	·	2.4 km	MPC · JPL
204504	2005 CR_{45}	—	February 2, 2005	Kitt Peak	Spacewatch	·	1.7 km	MPC · JPL
204505	2005 CE_{48}	—	February 2, 2005	Kitt Peak	Spacewatch	·	1.7 km	MPC · JPL
204506	2005 CR_{56}	—	February 9, 2005	Socorro	LINEAR	EUN	2.0 km	MPC · JPL
204507	2005 CE_{65}	—	February 9, 2005	Mount Lemmon	Mount Lemmon Survey	·	2.4 km	MPC · JPL
204508	2005 CW_{70}	—	February 1, 2005	Kitt Peak	Spacewatch	·	2.1 km	MPC · JPL
204509	2005 CN_{71}	—	February 1, 2005	Kitt Peak	Spacewatch	NEM	2.9 km	MPC · JPL
204510	2005 CS_{76}	—	February 4, 2005	Mount Lemmon	Mount Lemmon Survey	·	3.3 km	MPC · JPL
204511	2005 CP_{79}	—	February 1, 2005	Catalina	CSS	·	4.5 km	MPC · JPL
204512	2005 EF_{1}	—	March 2, 2005	Great Shefford	Birtwhistle, P.	·	3.0 km	MPC · JPL
204513	2005 EN_{7}	—	March 1, 2005	Kitt Peak	Spacewatch	·	2.8 km	MPC · JPL
204514	2005 EF_{17}	—	March 3, 2005	Kitt Peak	Spacewatch	·	2.2 km	MPC · JPL
204515	2005 EF_{19}	—	March 3, 2005	Kitt Peak	Spacewatch	KOR	1.9 km	MPC · JPL
204516	2005 EH_{21}	—	March 3, 2005	Catalina	CSS	LEO	3.2 km	MPC · JPL
204517	2005 EL_{21}	—	March 3, 2005	Catalina	CSS	·	2.5 km	MPC · JPL
204518	2005 EM_{25}	—	March 3, 2005	Catalina	CSS	KOR	2.4 km	MPC · JPL
204519	2005 EE_{28}	—	March 3, 2005	Catalina	CSS	BRA	2.6 km	MPC · JPL
204520	2005 ER_{33}	—	March 3, 2005	Catalina	CSS	AGN	4.0 km	MPC · JPL
204521	2005 EQ_{50}	—	March 3, 2005	Catalina	CSS	·	2.6 km	MPC · JPL
204522	2005 EQ_{53}	—	March 4, 2005	Kitt Peak	Spacewatch	·	1.4 km	MPC · JPL
204523	2005 EG_{66}	—	March 4, 2005	Catalina	CSS	·	2.5 km	MPC · JPL
204524	2005 EN_{74}	—	March 3, 2005	Catalina	CSS	·	2.6 km	MPC · JPL
204525	2005 EW_{79}	—	March 3, 2005	Catalina	CSS	·	4.2 km	MPC · JPL
204526	2005 EC_{86}	—	March 4, 2005	Socorro	LINEAR	·	2.3 km	MPC · JPL
204527	2005 EH_{86}	—	March 4, 2005	Socorro	LINEAR	AGN	2.2 km	MPC · JPL
204528	2005 EP_{87}	—	March 4, 2005	Mount Lemmon	Mount Lemmon Survey	KOR	2.0 km	MPC · JPL
204529	2005 EF_{90}	—	March 8, 2005	Anderson Mesa	LONEOS	·	3.0 km	MPC · JPL
204530	2005 EE_{102}	—	March 3, 2005	Catalina	CSS	HYG	5.3 km	MPC · JPL
204531	2005 EC_{104}	—	March 4, 2005	Kitt Peak	Spacewatch	AGN	1.7 km	MPC · JPL
204532	2005 EY_{110}	—	March 4, 2005	Catalina	CSS	DOR	4.9 km	MPC · JPL
204533	2005 EQ_{115}	—	March 4, 2005	Socorro	LINEAR	HYG	4.7 km	MPC · JPL
204534	2005 EP_{118}	—	March 7, 2005	Socorro	LINEAR	·	2.2 km	MPC · JPL
204535	2005 EC_{136}	—	March 9, 2005	Anderson Mesa	LONEOS	·	3.7 km	MPC · JPL
204536	2005 ET_{139}	—	March 9, 2005	Mount Lemmon	Mount Lemmon Survey	·	3.6 km	MPC · JPL
204537	2005 EM_{141}	—	March 10, 2005	Mount Lemmon	Mount Lemmon Survey	·	1.9 km	MPC · JPL
204538	2005 EE_{145}	—	March 10, 2005	Mount Lemmon	Mount Lemmon Survey	·	3.1 km	MPC · JPL
204539	2005 EW_{146}	—	March 10, 2005	Mount Lemmon	Mount Lemmon Survey	·	4.0 km	MPC · JPL
204540	2005 EW_{157}	—	March 9, 2005	Mount Lemmon	Mount Lemmon Survey	·	1.7 km	MPC · JPL
204541	2005 EF_{170}	—	March 11, 2005	Kitt Peak	Spacewatch	·	3.1 km	MPC · JPL
204542	2005 EP_{170}	—	March 7, 2005	Socorro	LINEAR	·	2.8 km	MPC · JPL
204543	2005 EU_{182}	—	March 9, 2005	Socorro	LINEAR	·	2.6 km	MPC · JPL
204544	2005 EZ_{183}	—	March 9, 2005	Mount Lemmon	Mount Lemmon Survey	·	3.3 km	MPC · JPL
204545	2005 ER_{186}	—	March 10, 2005	Mount Lemmon	Mount Lemmon Survey	fast	2.6 km	MPC · JPL
204546	2005 EW_{187}	—	March 10, 2005	Mount Lemmon	Mount Lemmon Survey	·	2.4 km	MPC · JPL
204547	2005 EV_{188}	—	March 10, 2005	Mount Lemmon	Mount Lemmon Survey	·	2.3 km	MPC · JPL
204548	2005 EP_{189}	—	March 11, 2005	Anderson Mesa	LONEOS	·	1.6 km	MPC · JPL
204549	2005 ER_{191}	—	March 11, 2005	Mount Lemmon	Mount Lemmon Survey	·	1.8 km	MPC · JPL
204550	2005 EE_{193}	—	March 11, 2005	Mount Lemmon	Mount Lemmon Survey	KOR	1.9 km	MPC · JPL
204551	2005 EU_{194}	—	March 11, 2005	Mount Lemmon	Mount Lemmon Survey	·	3.0 km	MPC · JPL
204552	2005 EV_{194}	—	March 11, 2005	Mount Lemmon	Mount Lemmon Survey	KOR	1.8 km	MPC · JPL
204553	2005 ED_{218}	—	March 9, 2005	Kitt Peak	Spacewatch	HYG	5.6 km	MPC · JPL
204554	2005 ES_{222}	—	March 8, 2005	Socorro	LINEAR	·	3.0 km	MPC · JPL
204555	2005 EY_{249}	—	March 14, 2005	Mount Lemmon	Mount Lemmon Survey	·	2.2 km	MPC · JPL
204556	2005 EA_{261}	—	March 12, 2005	Socorro	LINEAR	·	3.0 km	MPC · JPL
204557	2005 EQ_{262}	—	March 13, 2005	Kitt Peak	Spacewatch	·	1.6 km	MPC · JPL
204558	2005 EP_{264}	—	March 13, 2005	Kitt Peak	Spacewatch	EOS	2.2 km	MPC · JPL
204559	2005 EG_{265}	—	March 13, 2005	Kitt Peak	Spacewatch	·	3.8 km	MPC · JPL
204560	2005 EY_{274}	—	March 8, 2005	Anderson Mesa	LONEOS	·	1.9 km	MPC · JPL
204561	2005 EY_{276}	—	March 8, 2005	Mount Lemmon	Mount Lemmon Survey	·	4.4 km	MPC · JPL
204562	2005 EQ_{277}	—	March 9, 2005	Catalina	CSS	·	3.2 km	MPC · JPL
204563	2005 EO_{281}	—	March 10, 2005	Anderson Mesa	LONEOS	·	3.3 km	MPC · JPL
204564	2005 EQ_{281}	—	March 10, 2005	Catalina	CSS	·	2.9 km	MPC · JPL
204565	2005 EF_{290}	—	March 9, 2005	Mount Lemmon	Mount Lemmon Survey	KOR	2.1 km	MPC · JPL
204566	2005 EL_{299}	—	March 11, 2005	Kitt Peak	M. W. Buie	·	1.8 km	MPC · JPL
204567	2005 ER_{304}	—	March 11, 2005	Kitt Peak	M. W. Buie	·	2.9 km	MPC · JPL
204568	2005 EK_{309}	—	March 9, 2005	Mount Lemmon	Mount Lemmon Survey	·	2.1 km	MPC · JPL
204569	2005 EV_{311}	—	March 10, 2005	Mount Lemmon	Mount Lemmon Survey	·	3.4 km	MPC · JPL
204570 Veronicabray	2005 EA_{317}	Veronicabray	March 12, 2005	Kitt Peak	M. W. Buie	·	3.0 km	MPC · JPL
204571	2005 EX_{317}	—	March 9, 2005	Calvin-Rehoboth	Calvin College	·	1.7 km	MPC · JPL
204572	2005 EM_{323}	—	March 1, 2005	Kitt Peak	Spacewatch	·	2.7 km	MPC · JPL
204573	2005 EF_{327}	—	March 12, 2005	Kitt Peak	Spacewatch	·	2.9 km	MPC · JPL
204574	2005 FC_{4}	—	March 18, 2005	Socorro	LINEAR	·	2.9 km	MPC · JPL
204575	2005 FS_{7}	—	March 30, 2005	Catalina	CSS	·	3.2 km	MPC · JPL
204576	2005 GN_{9}	—	April 3, 2005	Kleť	Kleť	·	4.2 km	MPC · JPL
204577	2005 GC_{11}	—	April 1, 2005	Anderson Mesa	LONEOS	·	2.8 km	MPC · JPL
204578	2005 GX_{12}	—	April 1, 2005	Anderson Mesa	LONEOS	·	3.5 km	MPC · JPL
204579	2005 GV_{23}	—	April 1, 2005	Anderson Mesa	LONEOS	·	3.9 km	MPC · JPL
204580	2005 GV_{27}	—	April 3, 2005	Palomar	NEAT	·	2.8 km	MPC · JPL
204581	2005 GE_{35}	—	April 2, 2005	Anderson Mesa	LONEOS	·	2.0 km	MPC · JPL
204582	2005 GG_{43}	—	April 5, 2005	Palomar	NEAT	EOS	3.1 km	MPC · JPL
204583	2005 GD_{44}	—	April 5, 2005	Anderson Mesa	LONEOS	·	3.5 km	MPC · JPL
204584	2005 GE_{46}	—	April 5, 2005	Mount Lemmon	Mount Lemmon Survey	KOR	1.7 km	MPC · JPL
204585	2005 GP_{57}	—	April 6, 2005	Mount Lemmon	Mount Lemmon Survey	(5)	1.9 km	MPC · JPL
204586	2005 GQ_{58}	—	April 1, 2005	Kitt Peak	Spacewatch	·	4.1 km	MPC · JPL
204587	2005 GQ_{67}	—	April 2, 2005	Mount Lemmon	Mount Lemmon Survey	KOR	2.0 km	MPC · JPL
204588	2005 GE_{70}	—	April 4, 2005	Kitt Peak	Spacewatch	·	2.5 km	MPC · JPL
204589	2005 GF_{74}	—	April 4, 2005	Catalina	CSS	THB	5.8 km	MPC · JPL
204590	2005 GB_{90}	—	April 6, 2005	Campo Imperatore	CINEOS	·	3.5 km	MPC · JPL
204591	2005 GB_{104}	—	April 9, 2005	Siding Spring	SSS	·	2.4 km	MPC · JPL
204592	2005 GC_{107}	—	April 10, 2005	Mount Lemmon	Mount Lemmon Survey	KOR	1.5 km	MPC · JPL
204593	2005 GH_{113}	—	April 8, 2005	Socorro	LINEAR	·	3.6 km	MPC · JPL
204594	2005 GJ_{113}	—	April 8, 2005	Socorro	LINEAR	·	3.9 km	MPC · JPL
204595	2005 GA_{122}	—	April 6, 2005	Mount Lemmon	Mount Lemmon Survey	·	1.8 km	MPC · JPL
204596	2005 GA_{137}	—	April 10, 2005	Kitt Peak	Spacewatch	·	4.7 km	MPC · JPL
204597	2005 GO_{146}	—	April 11, 2005	Kitt Peak	Spacewatch	·	2.4 km	MPC · JPL
204598	2005 GP_{157}	—	April 11, 2005	Socorro	LINEAR	·	2.4 km	MPC · JPL
204599	2005 GA_{158}	—	April 12, 2005	Kitt Peak	Spacewatch	KOR	2.3 km	MPC · JPL
204600	2005 GJ_{171}	—	April 12, 2005	Mount Lemmon	Mount Lemmon Survey	·	2.4 km	MPC · JPL

== 204601–204700 ==
back to top

Designation			Discovery			Properties		Ref
Permanent	Provisional	Named after	Date	Site	Discoverer(s)	Category	Diam.	Ref
204601	2005 GJ_{179}	—	April 13, 2005	Catalina	CSS	·	2.9 km	MPC · JPL
204602 Lawrencebrown	2005 GC_{205}	Lawrencebrown	April 11, 2005	Kitt Peak	M. W. Buie	KOR	1.8 km	MPC · JPL
204603	2005 JW_{3}	—	May 2, 2005	Kitt Peak	Spacewatch	·	3.8 km	MPC · JPL
204604	2005 JZ_{4}	—	May 4, 2005	Kitt Peak	Spacewatch	(1298)	3.6 km	MPC · JPL
204605	2005 JG_{14}	—	May 1, 2005	Palomar	NEAT	·	2.7 km	MPC · JPL
204606	2005 JB_{19}	—	May 4, 2005	Mount Lemmon	Mount Lemmon Survey	·	3.2 km	MPC · JPL
204607	2005 JA_{29}	—	May 3, 2005	Kitt Peak	Spacewatch	·	4.7 km	MPC · JPL
204608	2005 JB_{43}	—	May 8, 2005	Mount Lemmon	Mount Lemmon Survey	·	2.5 km	MPC · JPL
204609	2005 JO_{46}	—	May 3, 2005	Kitt Peak	Spacewatch	·	2.2 km	MPC · JPL
204610	2005 JQ_{73}	—	May 8, 2005	Kitt Peak	Spacewatch	EOS	6.0 km	MPC · JPL
204611	2005 JN_{109}	—	May 11, 2005	Cordell-Lorenz	D. T. Durig	·	3.4 km	MPC · JPL
204612	2005 JE_{124}	—	May 11, 2005	Anderson Mesa	LONEOS	·	5.7 km	MPC · JPL
204613	2005 JU_{137}	—	May 13, 2005	Mount Lemmon	Mount Lemmon Survey	·	4.7 km	MPC · JPL
204614	2005 JC_{146}	—	May 13, 2005	Mount Lemmon	Mount Lemmon Survey	·	3.5 km	MPC · JPL
204615	2005 JM_{156}	—	May 4, 2005	Mount Lemmon	Mount Lemmon Survey	·	3.3 km	MPC · JPL
204616	2005 KB_{12}	—	May 31, 2005	Catalina	CSS	TIR	4.8 km	MPC · JPL
204617	2005 LB_{5}	—	June 1, 2005	Kitt Peak	Spacewatch	EOS	2.7 km	MPC · JPL
204618	2005 LL_{10}	—	June 3, 2005	Kitt Peak	Spacewatch	·	3.5 km	MPC · JPL
204619	2005 LB_{37}	—	June 13, 2005	Bergisch Gladbach	W. Bickel	L4	15 km	MPC · JPL
204620	2005 LD_{38}	—	June 11, 2005	Kitt Peak	Spacewatch	·	4.0 km	MPC · JPL
204621	2005 LU_{49}	—	June 11, 2005	Catalina	CSS	·	5.3 km	MPC · JPL
204622	2005 MD_{8}	—	June 27, 2005	Kitt Peak	Spacewatch	3:2	7.2 km	MPC · JPL
204623	2005 ML_{23}	—	June 24, 2005	Palomar	NEAT	·	4.8 km	MPC · JPL
204624	2005 PF_{21}	—	August 1, 2005	Siding Spring	SSS	H	900 m	MPC · JPL
204625	2005 RH_{34}	—	September 15, 2005	Catalina	CSS	H	710 m	MPC · JPL
204626	2005 SF_{10}	—	September 26, 2005	Socorro	LINEAR	H	810 m	MPC · JPL
204627	2005 WK_{54}	—	November 21, 2005	Kitt Peak	Spacewatch	·	1.4 km	MPC · JPL
204628	2005 WK_{102}	—	November 29, 2005	Mount Lemmon	Mount Lemmon Survey	·	860 m	MPC · JPL
204629	2005 XF_{38}	—	December 4, 2005	Kitt Peak	Spacewatch	(2076)	1.6 km	MPC · JPL
204630	2005 XW_{57}	—	December 1, 2005	Kitt Peak	Spacewatch	·	2.1 km	MPC · JPL
204631	2005 XH_{64}	—	December 6, 2005	Kitt Peak	Spacewatch	·	1.0 km	MPC · JPL
204632 Jamesburch	2005 XY_{114}	Jamesburch	December 1, 2005	Kitt Peak	M. W. Buie	MAS	970 m	MPC · JPL
204633	2005 YD_{65}	—	December 25, 2005	Kitt Peak	Spacewatch	·	930 m	MPC · JPL
204634	2005 YB_{73}	—	December 24, 2005	Kitt Peak	Spacewatch	·	830 m	MPC · JPL
204635	2005 YC_{131}	—	December 25, 2005	Mount Lemmon	Mount Lemmon Survey	·	950 m	MPC · JPL
204636	2005 YW_{201}	—	December 24, 2005	Kitt Peak	Spacewatch	·	1.1 km	MPC · JPL
204637	2005 YG_{208}	—	December 29, 2005	Catalina	CSS	·	2.0 km	MPC · JPL
204638	2006 AV_{4}	—	January 2, 2006	Catalina	CSS	·	1.1 km	MPC · JPL
204639	2006 AD_{17}	—	January 5, 2006	Kitt Peak	Spacewatch	·	1.7 km	MPC · JPL
204640	2006 AS_{20}	—	January 5, 2006	Catalina	CSS	·	1.6 km	MPC · JPL
204641	2006 AX_{86}	—	January 9, 2006	Mount Lemmon	Mount Lemmon Survey	·	1.2 km	MPC · JPL
204642	2006 AA_{94}	—	January 8, 2006	Kitt Peak	Spacewatch	MAS	2.2 km	MPC · JPL
204643	2006 BZ_{18}	—	January 22, 2006	Anderson Mesa	LONEOS	·	1.1 km	MPC · JPL
204644	2006 BK_{32}	—	January 20, 2006	Kitt Peak	Spacewatch	·	1.9 km	MPC · JPL
204645	2006 BE_{38}	—	January 23, 2006	Kitt Peak	Spacewatch	·	1.1 km	MPC · JPL
204646	2006 BK_{54}	—	January 25, 2006	Kitt Peak	Spacewatch	MAS	820 m	MPC · JPL
204647	2006 BY_{57}	—	January 23, 2006	Mount Lemmon	Mount Lemmon Survey	·	1.7 km	MPC · JPL
204648	2006 BB_{65}	—	January 22, 2006	Mount Lemmon	Mount Lemmon Survey	·	1.2 km	MPC · JPL
204649	2006 BT_{79}	—	January 23, 2006	Kitt Peak	Spacewatch	·	1.5 km	MPC · JPL
204650	2006 BN_{99}	—	January 29, 2006	Vail-Jarnac	Jarnac	·	1.1 km	MPC · JPL
204651	2006 BW_{123}	—	January 26, 2006	Kitt Peak	Spacewatch	·	1.4 km	MPC · JPL
204652	2006 BO_{125}	—	January 26, 2006	Kitt Peak	Spacewatch	·	2.0 km	MPC · JPL
204653	2006 BF_{158}	—	January 25, 2006	Kitt Peak	Spacewatch	·	2.1 km	MPC · JPL
204654	2006 BJ_{161}	—	January 26, 2006	Kitt Peak	Spacewatch	·	1.0 km	MPC · JPL
204655	2006 BJ_{193}	—	January 30, 2006	Kitt Peak	Spacewatch	·	850 m	MPC · JPL
204656	2006 BU_{248}	—	January 31, 2006	Kitt Peak	Spacewatch	MAS	1.2 km	MPC · JPL
204657	2006 BO_{262}	—	January 31, 2006	Kitt Peak	Spacewatch	·	2.3 km	MPC · JPL
204658	2006 BK_{265}	—	January 31, 2006	Kitt Peak	Spacewatch	·	820 m	MPC · JPL
204659	2006 CB_{18}	—	February 1, 2006	Kitt Peak	Spacewatch	·	1.1 km	MPC · JPL
204660	2006 CV_{18}	—	February 1, 2006	Kitt Peak	Spacewatch	(2076)	1.1 km	MPC · JPL
204661	2006 CU_{21}	—	February 1, 2006	Kitt Peak	Spacewatch	·	960 m	MPC · JPL
204662	2006 CA_{22}	—	February 1, 2006	Kitt Peak	Spacewatch	·	1.0 km	MPC · JPL
204663	2006 CM_{62}	—	February 11, 2006	Anderson Mesa	LONEOS	·	2.3 km	MPC · JPL
204664	2006 DA_{4}	—	February 20, 2006	Catalina	CSS	·	1.1 km	MPC · JPL
204665	2006 DB_{4}	—	February 20, 2006	Catalina	CSS	·	890 m	MPC · JPL
204666	2006 DB_{6}	—	February 20, 2006	Catalina	CSS	·	1.1 km	MPC · JPL
204667	2006 DP_{9}	—	February 21, 2006	Catalina	CSS	·	2.7 km	MPC · JPL
204668	2006 DP_{15}	—	February 20, 2006	Kitt Peak	Spacewatch	·	2.4 km	MPC · JPL
204669	2006 DP_{20}	—	February 20, 2006	Catalina	CSS	NYS	1.3 km	MPC · JPL
204670	2006 DC_{24}	—	February 20, 2006	Kitt Peak	Spacewatch	·	1.4 km	MPC · JPL
204671	2006 DG_{31}	—	February 20, 2006	Mount Lemmon	Mount Lemmon Survey	NYS ·	1.7 km	MPC · JPL
204672	2006 DJ_{32}	—	February 20, 2006	Mount Lemmon	Mount Lemmon Survey	MAS	920 m	MPC · JPL
204673	2006 DO_{33}	—	February 20, 2006	Kitt Peak	Spacewatch	·	940 m	MPC · JPL
204674	2006 DQ_{57}	—	February 24, 2006	Mount Lemmon	Mount Lemmon Survey	KOR	1.9 km	MPC · JPL
204675	2006 DE_{72}	—	February 22, 2006	Catalina	CSS	(2076)	1.0 km	MPC · JPL
204676	2006 DL_{76}	—	February 24, 2006	Kitt Peak	Spacewatch	·	2.3 km	MPC · JPL
204677	2006 DQ_{76}	—	February 24, 2006	Kitt Peak	Spacewatch	·	2.3 km	MPC · JPL
204678	2006 DH_{81}	—	February 24, 2006	Kitt Peak	Spacewatch	·	1.8 km	MPC · JPL
204679	2006 DU_{84}	—	February 24, 2006	Kitt Peak	Spacewatch	·	1.9 km	MPC · JPL
204680	2006 DF_{96}	—	February 24, 2006	Kitt Peak	Spacewatch	·	1.9 km	MPC · JPL
204681	2006 DQ_{110}	—	February 25, 2006	Kitt Peak	Spacewatch	·	2.7 km	MPC · JPL
204682	2006 DF_{115}	—	February 27, 2006	Kitt Peak	Spacewatch	NYS	1.6 km	MPC · JPL
204683	2006 DJ_{152}	—	February 25, 2006	Kitt Peak	Spacewatch	·	2.3 km	MPC · JPL
204684	2006 DF_{164}	—	February 27, 2006	Mount Lemmon	Mount Lemmon Survey	·	1.7 km	MPC · JPL
204685	2006 DF_{166}	—	February 27, 2006	Kitt Peak	Spacewatch	NYS	1.8 km	MPC · JPL
204686	2006 DT_{183}	—	February 27, 2006	Kitt Peak	Spacewatch	·	2.2 km	MPC · JPL
204687	2006 DD_{190}	—	February 27, 2006	Kitt Peak	Spacewatch	·	1.1 km	MPC · JPL
204688	2006 DM_{199}	—	February 23, 2006	Anderson Mesa	LONEOS	·	1.4 km	MPC · JPL
204689	2006 DO_{206}	—	February 25, 2006	Kitt Peak	Spacewatch	PAD	3.6 km	MPC · JPL
204690	2006 DC_{210}	—	February 20, 2006	Kitt Peak	Spacewatch	·	1.6 km	MPC · JPL
204691	2006 DC_{215}	—	February 27, 2006	Mount Lemmon	Mount Lemmon Survey	·	1.2 km	MPC · JPL
204692	2006 ET	—	March 4, 2006	Goodricke-Pigott	R. A. Tucker	·	1.4 km	MPC · JPL
204693	2006 EM_{1}	—	March 2, 2006	Mount Nyukasa	Japan Aerospace Exploration Agency	·	3.0 km	MPC · JPL
204694	2006 EL_{2}	—	March 3, 2006	Mount Nyukasa	Japan Aerospace Exploration Agency	·	2.3 km	MPC · JPL
204695	2006 ER_{7}	—	March 2, 2006	Kitt Peak	Spacewatch	NYS	1.6 km	MPC · JPL
204696	2006 EW_{11}	—	March 2, 2006	Kitt Peak	Spacewatch	MAS	1.2 km	MPC · JPL
204697	2006 EX_{16}	—	March 2, 2006	Mount Lemmon	Mount Lemmon Survey	·	1.6 km	MPC · JPL
204698	2006 EB_{18}	—	March 2, 2006	Mount Lemmon	Mount Lemmon Survey	·	1.1 km	MPC · JPL
204699	2006 EO_{45}	—	March 3, 2006	Mount Nyukasa	Japan Aerospace Exploration Agency	·	1.9 km	MPC · JPL
204700	2006 EB_{55}	—	March 5, 2006	Kitt Peak	Spacewatch	·	1.8 km	MPC · JPL

== 204701–204800 ==
back to top

Designation			Discovery			Properties		Ref
Permanent	Provisional	Named after	Date	Site	Discoverer(s)	Category	Diam.	Ref
204701	2006 EM_{65}	—	March 5, 2006	Kitt Peak	Spacewatch	AGN	1.4 km	MPC · JPL
204702 Péquignat	2006 FN_{9}	Péquignat	March 19, 2006	Vicques	M. Ory	DOR	3.9 km	MPC · JPL
204703	2006 FD_{24}	—	March 24, 2006	Kitt Peak	Spacewatch	·	1.3 km	MPC · JPL
204704	2006 FD_{36}	—	March 24, 2006	Socorro	LINEAR	·	1.1 km	MPC · JPL
204705 Pagan	2006 FY_{37}	Pagan	March 30, 2006	Nyukasa	Nakanishi, A., Futaba, F.	·	5.4 km	MPC · JPL
204706	2006 FC_{47}	—	March 23, 2006	Catalina	CSS	·	1.2 km	MPC · JPL
204707	2006 FB_{52}	—	March 26, 2006	Anderson Mesa	LONEOS	·	2.7 km	MPC · JPL
204708	2006 FG_{52}	—	March 26, 2006	Siding Spring	SSS	·	4.6 km	MPC · JPL
204709	2006 FN_{54}	—	March 25, 2006	Kitt Peak	Spacewatch	·	1.5 km	MPC · JPL
204710 Gaoxing	2006 GE	Gaoxing	April 1, 2006	Lulin	Lin, H.-C., Q. Ye	·	1.0 km	MPC · JPL
204711 Luojialun	2006 GN	Luojialun	April 1, 2006	Lulin	Lin, H.-C., Q. Ye	·	2.6 km	MPC · JPL
204712	2006 GP_{13}	—	April 2, 2006	Kitt Peak	Spacewatch	NYS	1.7 km	MPC · JPL
204713	2006 GM_{14}	—	April 2, 2006	Kitt Peak	Spacewatch	NYS	1.2 km	MPC · JPL
204714	2006 GR_{19}	—	April 2, 2006	Kitt Peak	Spacewatch	·	2.2 km	MPC · JPL
204715	2006 GZ_{22}	—	April 2, 2006	Kitt Peak	Spacewatch	·	860 m	MPC · JPL
204716	2006 GV_{23}	—	April 2, 2006	Kitt Peak	Spacewatch	·	2.1 km	MPC · JPL
204717	2006 GQ_{25}	—	April 2, 2006	Kitt Peak	Spacewatch	AGN	1.2 km	MPC · JPL
204718	2006 GR_{38}	—	April 6, 2006	Catalina	CSS	EUN	2.3 km	MPC · JPL
204719	2006 GD_{40}	—	April 6, 2006	Socorro	LINEAR	·	1.3 km	MPC · JPL
204720	2006 GH_{41}	—	April 7, 2006	Catalina	CSS	·	2.8 km	MPC · JPL
204721	2006 GN_{43}	—	April 2, 2006	Kitt Peak	Spacewatch	NYS	1.6 km	MPC · JPL
204722	2006 HK_{2}	—	April 18, 2006	Palomar	NEAT	·	1.6 km	MPC · JPL
204723	2006 HO_{2}	—	April 18, 2006	Kitt Peak	Spacewatch	·	1.1 km	MPC · JPL
204724	2006 HU_{7}	—	April 20, 2006	Catalina	CSS	PHO	1.7 km	MPC · JPL
204725	2006 HK_{11}	—	April 19, 2006	Kitt Peak	Spacewatch	·	2.0 km	MPC · JPL
204726	2006 HF_{25}	—	April 20, 2006	Kitt Peak	Spacewatch	NYS	2.0 km	MPC · JPL
204727	2006 HT_{26}	—	April 20, 2006	Kitt Peak	Spacewatch	·	4.2 km	MPC · JPL
204728	2006 HP_{35}	—	April 19, 2006	Catalina	CSS	·	1.9 km	MPC · JPL
204729	2006 HR_{39}	—	April 21, 2006	Catalina	CSS	EUN	2.5 km	MPC · JPL
204730	2006 HZ_{39}	—	April 21, 2006	Kitt Peak	Spacewatch	PHO	1.3 km	MPC · JPL
204731	2006 HK_{43}	—	April 24, 2006	Mount Lemmon	Mount Lemmon Survey	·	1.1 km	MPC · JPL
204732	2006 HH_{49}	—	April 25, 2006	Kitt Peak	Spacewatch	·	1.4 km	MPC · JPL
204733	2006 HP_{63}	—	April 24, 2006	Kitt Peak	Spacewatch	·	2.0 km	MPC · JPL
204734	2006 HY_{66}	—	April 24, 2006	Kitt Peak	Spacewatch	·	1.9 km	MPC · JPL
204735	2006 HX_{67}	—	April 24, 2006	Mount Lemmon	Mount Lemmon Survey	KOR	1.8 km	MPC · JPL
204736	2006 HF_{72}	—	April 25, 2006	Kitt Peak	Spacewatch	·	2.9 km	MPC · JPL
204737	2006 HC_{74}	—	April 25, 2006	Kitt Peak	Spacewatch	·	1.0 km	MPC · JPL
204738	2006 HW_{83}	—	April 26, 2006	Kitt Peak	Spacewatch	·	2.0 km	MPC · JPL
204739	2006 HA_{85}	—	April 26, 2006	Kitt Peak	Spacewatch	·	4.9 km	MPC · JPL
204740	2006 HB_{87}	—	April 29, 2006	Siding Spring	SSS	·	2.4 km	MPC · JPL
204741	2006 HQ_{88}	—	April 30, 2006	Catalina	CSS	·	1.8 km	MPC · JPL
204742	2006 HD_{100}	—	April 30, 2006	Kitt Peak	Spacewatch	·	1.9 km	MPC · JPL
204743	2006 HK_{102}	—	April 30, 2006	Kitt Peak	Spacewatch	·	5.0 km	MPC · JPL
204744	2006 HG_{103}	—	April 30, 2006	Kitt Peak	Spacewatch	·	2.8 km	MPC · JPL
204745	2006 HJ_{114}	—	April 26, 2006	Kitt Peak	Spacewatch	NYS	1.6 km	MPC · JPL
204746	2006 HM_{152}	—	April 20, 2006	Kitt Peak	Spacewatch	·	2.3 km	MPC · JPL
204747	2006 JF_{2}	—	May 1, 2006	Socorro	LINEAR	·	3.4 km	MPC · JPL
204748	2006 JL_{3}	—	May 2, 2006	Mount Lemmon	Mount Lemmon Survey	(5)	1.5 km	MPC · JPL
204749	2006 JZ_{13}	—	May 4, 2006	Mount Lemmon	Mount Lemmon Survey	AGN	2.0 km	MPC · JPL
204750	2006 JM_{14}	—	May 4, 2006	Siding Spring	SSS	·	2.8 km	MPC · JPL
204751	2006 JN_{18}	—	May 2, 2006	Mount Lemmon	Mount Lemmon Survey	·	3.2 km	MPC · JPL
204752	2006 JG_{21}	—	May 2, 2006	Kitt Peak	Spacewatch	·	2.8 km	MPC · JPL
204753	2006 JK_{24}	—	May 4, 2006	Mount Lemmon	Mount Lemmon Survey	·	1.9 km	MPC · JPL
204754	2006 JK_{30}	—	May 3, 2006	Kitt Peak	Spacewatch	THM	5.5 km	MPC · JPL
204755	2006 JK_{35}	—	May 4, 2006	Kitt Peak	Spacewatch	·	2.2 km	MPC · JPL
204756	2006 JF_{36}	—	May 4, 2006	Kitt Peak	Spacewatch	·	1.8 km	MPC · JPL
204757	2006 JL_{37}	—	May 5, 2006	Kitt Peak	Spacewatch	NEM	2.6 km	MPC · JPL
204758	2006 JS_{39}	—	May 6, 2006	Mount Lemmon	Mount Lemmon Survey	HOF	5.6 km	MPC · JPL
204759	2006 JF_{45}	—	May 7, 2006	Mount Lemmon	Mount Lemmon Survey	NYS	1.4 km	MPC · JPL
204760	2006 JN_{50}	—	May 2, 2006	Mount Lemmon	Mount Lemmon Survey	·	3.2 km	MPC · JPL
204761	2006 JU_{53}	—	May 7, 2006	Kitt Peak	Spacewatch	·	1.0 km	MPC · JPL
204762	2006 JC_{54}	—	May 7, 2006	Mount Lemmon	Mount Lemmon Survey	·	1.4 km	MPC · JPL
204763	2006 JP_{56}	—	May 7, 2006	Catalina	CSS	·	2.7 km	MPC · JPL
204764 Lindaburke	2006 JW_{59}	Lindaburke	May 1, 2006	Kitt Peak	M. W. Buie	·	840 m	MPC · JPL
204765	2006 KH	—	May 16, 2006	Palomar	NEAT	·	2.4 km	MPC · JPL
204766	2006 KW_{3}	—	May 19, 2006	Mount Lemmon	Mount Lemmon Survey	·	1.2 km	MPC · JPL
204767	2006 KD_{4}	—	May 19, 2006	Anderson Mesa	LONEOS	·	3.3 km	MPC · JPL
204768	2006 KX_{4}	—	May 19, 2006	Mount Lemmon	Mount Lemmon Survey	·	980 m	MPC · JPL
204769	2006 KG_{8}	—	May 19, 2006	Mount Lemmon	Mount Lemmon Survey	·	4.1 km	MPC · JPL
204770	2006 KB_{10}	—	May 19, 2006	Catalina	CSS	·	4.7 km	MPC · JPL
204771	2006 KB_{20}	—	May 18, 2006	Siding Spring	SSS	·	1.6 km	MPC · JPL
204772	2006 KR_{29}	—	May 20, 2006	Kitt Peak	Spacewatch	·	1.7 km	MPC · JPL
204773	2006 KD_{38}	—	May 16, 2006	Siding Spring	SSS	·	2.8 km	MPC · JPL
204774	2006 KH_{39}	—	May 18, 2006	Siding Spring	SSS	·	6.9 km	MPC · JPL
204775	2006 KA_{41}	—	May 19, 2006	Mount Lemmon	Mount Lemmon Survey	MAR	1.7 km	MPC · JPL
204776	2006 KF_{43}	—	May 20, 2006	Kitt Peak	Spacewatch	·	2.6 km	MPC · JPL
204777	2006 KV_{43}	—	May 20, 2006	Siding Spring	SSS	·	2.4 km	MPC · JPL
204778	2006 KS_{46}	—	May 21, 2006	Mount Lemmon	Mount Lemmon Survey	·	2.1 km	MPC · JPL
204779	2006 KX_{46}	—	May 21, 2006	Mount Lemmon	Mount Lemmon Survey	·	2.3 km	MPC · JPL
204780	2006 KA_{52}	—	May 21, 2006	Kitt Peak	Spacewatch	·	2.2 km	MPC · JPL
204781	2006 KX_{64}	—	May 23, 2006	Mount Lemmon	Mount Lemmon Survey	RAF	2.0 km	MPC · JPL
204782	2006 KU_{75}	—	May 24, 2006	Palomar	NEAT	·	3.2 km	MPC · JPL
204783	2006 KW_{89}	—	May 21, 2006	Mount Lemmon	Mount Lemmon Survey	·	3.1 km	MPC · JPL
204784	2006 KL_{93}	—	May 25, 2006	Kitt Peak	Spacewatch	·	3.1 km	MPC · JPL
204785	2006 KT_{102}	—	May 28, 2006	Catalina	CSS	·	2.1 km	MPC · JPL
204786 Wehlau	2006 KU_{131}	Wehlau	May 25, 2006	Mauna Kea	P. A. Wiegert	·	1.3 km	MPC · JPL
204787	2006 NB_{1}	—	July 6, 2006	Siding Spring	SSS	THB	6.7 km	MPC · JPL
204788	2006 PG_{11}	—	August 13, 2006	Palomar	NEAT	·	4.0 km	MPC · JPL
204789	2006 PE_{37}	—	August 12, 2006	Palomar	NEAT	·	5.5 km	MPC · JPL
204790	2006 QN_{10}	—	August 21, 2006	Hibiscus	S. F. Hönig	·	4.5 km	MPC · JPL
204791	2006 QK_{58}	—	August 27, 2006	Goodricke-Pigott	R. A. Tucker	·	4.5 km	MPC · JPL
204792	2006 QS_{59}	—	August 19, 2006	Palomar	NEAT	EOS	2.9 km	MPC · JPL
204793	2006 QD_{79}	—	August 23, 2006	Palomar	NEAT	·	4.7 km	MPC · JPL
204794	2006 QD_{81}	—	August 24, 2006	Palomar	NEAT	KON	3.5 km	MPC · JPL
204795	2006 QK_{87}	—	August 27, 2006	Kitt Peak	Spacewatch	EOS	2.5 km	MPC · JPL
204796	2006 QX_{102}	—	August 27, 2006	Kitt Peak	Spacewatch	·	2.8 km	MPC · JPL
204797	2006 QO_{116}	—	August 27, 2006	Anderson Mesa	LONEOS	·	5.3 km	MPC · JPL
204798	2006 QU_{129}	—	August 19, 2006	Anderson Mesa	LONEOS	·	1.5 km	MPC · JPL
204799	2006 RW_{4}	—	September 14, 2006	Kitt Peak	Spacewatch	·	3.5 km	MPC · JPL
204800	2006 RL_{26}	—	September 14, 2006	Catalina	CSS	·	2.6 km	MPC · JPL

== 204801–204900 ==
back to top

Designation			Discovery			Properties		Ref
Permanent	Provisional	Named after	Date	Site	Discoverer(s)	Category	Diam.	Ref
204801	2006 RS_{59}	—	September 15, 2006	Kitt Peak	Spacewatch	·	1.9 km	MPC · JPL
204802	2006 SS_{22}	—	September 17, 2006	Anderson Mesa	LONEOS	EOS	2.9 km	MPC · JPL
204803	2006 SQ_{98}	—	September 18, 2006	Kitt Peak	Spacewatch	3:2	6.9 km	MPC · JPL
204804	2006 SU_{373}	—	September 16, 2006	Apache Point	A. C. Becker	·	5.2 km	MPC · JPL
204805 Šipöcz	2006 TS_{9}	Šipöcz	October 11, 2006	Modra	Š. Gajdoš, J. Világi	·	3.9 km	MPC · JPL
204806	2007 GX_{10}	—	April 11, 2007	Kitt Peak	Spacewatch	·	1.1 km	MPC · JPL
204807	2007 GQ_{23}	—	April 11, 2007	Kitt Peak	Spacewatch	·	2.7 km	MPC · JPL
204808	2007 GH_{27}	—	April 14, 2007	Kitt Peak	Spacewatch	·	1.3 km	MPC · JPL
204809	2007 HJ_{27}	—	April 18, 2007	Mount Lemmon	Mount Lemmon Survey	·	2.0 km	MPC · JPL
204810	2007 JQ_{30}	—	May 11, 2007	Mount Lemmon	Mount Lemmon Survey	·	1.4 km	MPC · JPL
204811	2007 LO_{33}	—	June 11, 2007	Siding Spring	SSS	·	2.8 km	MPC · JPL
204812	2007 ME_{3}	—	June 16, 2007	Kitt Peak	Spacewatch	·	2.8 km	MPC · JPL
204813	2007 MM_{6}	—	June 21, 2007	Tiki	S. F. Hönig, Teamo, N.	·	2.8 km	MPC · JPL
204814	2007 MD_{10}	—	June 21, 2007	Anderson Mesa	LONEOS	MAR	1.8 km	MPC · JPL
204815	2007 NP_{1}	—	July 10, 2007	Siding Spring	SSS	·	4.3 km	MPC · JPL
204816 Andreacamilleri	2007 OZ	Andreacamilleri	July 16, 2007	Vallemare Borbona	V. S. Casulli	GEF	1.4 km	MPC · JPL
204817	2007 OE_{1}	—	July 18, 2007	Mount Lemmon	Mount Lemmon Survey	MAS	1.1 km	MPC · JPL
204818	2007 OE_{4}	—	July 22, 2007	Tiki	S. F. Hönig, Teamo, N.	MAS	1.2 km	MPC · JPL
204819	2007 PU_{1}	—	August 6, 2007	Reedy Creek	J. Broughton	MAS	1.2 km	MPC · JPL
204820	2007 PY_{2}	—	August 7, 2007	Reedy Creek	J. Broughton	·	1.7 km	MPC · JPL
204821	2007 PJ_{10}	—	August 9, 2007	Socorro	LINEAR	·	940 m	MPC · JPL
204822	2007 PZ_{10}	—	August 11, 2007	La Sagra	OAM	·	3.6 km	MPC · JPL
204823	2007 PX_{13}	—	August 8, 2007	Socorro	LINEAR	·	1.1 km	MPC · JPL
204824	2007 PP_{17}	—	August 9, 2007	Socorro	LINEAR	·	1.5 km	MPC · JPL
204825	2007 PS_{18}	—	August 9, 2007	Socorro	LINEAR	·	1.5 km	MPC · JPL
204826	2007 PL_{20}	—	August 9, 2007	Socorro	LINEAR	·	2.4 km	MPC · JPL
204827	2007 PR_{20}	—	August 9, 2007	Socorro	LINEAR	DOR	4.5 km	MPC · JPL
204828	2007 PF_{22}	—	August 10, 2007	Kitt Peak	Spacewatch	·	2.7 km	MPC · JPL
204829	2007 PJ_{24}	—	August 12, 2007	Socorro	LINEAR	(2076)	1.3 km	MPC · JPL
204830	2007 PP_{25}	—	August 13, 2007	Bisei SG Center	BATTeRS	·	1.9 km	MPC · JPL
204831 Levski	2007 PQ_{28}	Levski	August 14, 2007	Zvezdno Obshtestvo	Obshtestvo, Zvezdno	·	3.0 km	MPC · JPL
204832	2007 PH_{31}	—	August 5, 2007	Socorro	LINEAR	·	3.4 km	MPC · JPL
204833	2007 PY_{34}	—	August 9, 2007	Kitt Peak	Spacewatch	·	1.0 km	MPC · JPL
204834	2007 PN_{35}	—	August 10, 2007	Kitt Peak	Spacewatch	·	3.6 km	MPC · JPL
204835	2007 PC_{45}	—	August 10, 2007	Kitt Peak	Spacewatch	·	3.6 km	MPC · JPL
204836 Xiexiaosi	2007 QS_{1}	Xiexiaosi	August 16, 2007	XuYi	PMO NEO Survey Program	·	8.0 km	MPC · JPL
204837	2007 QM_{2}	—	August 21, 2007	Hibiscus	S. F. Hönig, Teamo, N.	EOS	2.8 km	MPC · JPL
204838	2007 QQ_{6}	—	August 21, 2007	Anderson Mesa	LONEOS	·	3.2 km	MPC · JPL
204839 Suzhouyuanlin	2007 QK_{13}	Suzhouyuanlin	August 16, 2007	XuYi	PMO NEO Survey Program	·	1.6 km	MPC · JPL
204840	2007 RD_{3}	—	September 3, 2007	Catalina	CSS	·	2.2 km	MPC · JPL
204841	2007 RJ_{13}	—	September 3, 2007	Catalina	CSS	NYS	1.6 km	MPC · JPL
204842 Fengchia	2007 RN_{19}	Fengchia	September 5, 2007	Lulin	Lin, C.-S., Q. Ye	THM	3.6 km	MPC · JPL
204843	2007 RF_{21}	—	September 3, 2007	Catalina	CSS	THM	3.0 km	MPC · JPL
204844	2007 RT_{23}	—	September 3, 2007	Catalina	CSS	·	2.7 km	MPC · JPL
204845	2007 RG_{38}	—	September 8, 2007	Anderson Mesa	LONEOS	·	2.5 km	MPC · JPL
204846	2007 RD_{48}	—	September 9, 2007	Mount Lemmon	Mount Lemmon Survey	KOR	1.9 km	MPC · JPL
204847	2007 RN_{63}	—	September 10, 2007	Mount Lemmon	Mount Lemmon Survey	L4	10 km	MPC · JPL
204848	2007 RK_{70}	—	September 10, 2007	Kitt Peak	Spacewatch	·	2.2 km	MPC · JPL
204849	2007 RK_{105}	—	September 11, 2007	Catalina	CSS	KOR	2.0 km	MPC · JPL
204850	2007 RD_{121}	—	September 12, 2007	Mount Lemmon	Mount Lemmon Survey	·	5.0 km	MPC · JPL
204851	2007 RW_{130}	—	September 12, 2007	Mount Lemmon	Mount Lemmon Survey	T_{j} (2.99) · 3:2 · SHU	6.4 km	MPC · JPL
204852 Frankfurt	2007 RH_{133}	Frankfurt	September 15, 2007	Taunus	E. Schwab, R. Kling	·	3.0 km	MPC · JPL
204853	2007 RB_{136}	—	September 14, 2007	Mount Lemmon	Mount Lemmon Survey	AST	3.4 km	MPC · JPL
204854	2007 RF_{140}	—	September 13, 2007	Socorro	LINEAR	·	2.4 km	MPC · JPL
204855	2007 RT_{140}	—	September 13, 2007	Socorro	LINEAR	MAS	1.3 km	MPC · JPL
204856	2007 RS_{155}	—	September 10, 2007	Mount Lemmon	Mount Lemmon Survey	3:2 · SHU	6.5 km	MPC · JPL
204857	2007 RM_{156}	—	September 10, 2007	Mount Lemmon	Mount Lemmon Survey	·	1.7 km	MPC · JPL
204858	2007 RN_{176}	—	September 10, 2007	Catalina	CSS	·	2.7 km	MPC · JPL
204859	2007 RF_{180}	—	September 11, 2007	Catalina	CSS	·	2.6 km	MPC · JPL
204860	2007 RX_{193}	—	September 12, 2007	Kitt Peak	Spacewatch	·	2.3 km	MPC · JPL
204861	2007 RP_{204}	—	September 9, 2007	Kitt Peak	Spacewatch	·	1.9 km	MPC · JPL
204862	2007 RC_{206}	—	September 10, 2007	Mount Lemmon	Mount Lemmon Survey	·	1.6 km	MPC · JPL
204863	2007 RF_{211}	—	September 11, 2007	Kitt Peak	Spacewatch	(5)	1.4 km	MPC · JPL
204864	2007 RK_{211}	—	September 11, 2007	Mount Lemmon	Mount Lemmon Survey	·	4.9 km	MPC · JPL
204865	2007 RU_{233}	—	September 12, 2007	Mount Lemmon	Mount Lemmon Survey	·	4.0 km	MPC · JPL
204866	2007 RE_{235}	—	September 12, 2007	Mount Lemmon	Mount Lemmon Survey	KOR	2.1 km	MPC · JPL
204867	2007 RQ_{242}	—	September 15, 2007	Socorro	LINEAR	THM	3.4 km	MPC · JPL
204868	2007 RE_{267}	—	September 15, 2007	Kitt Peak	Spacewatch	·	2.3 km	MPC · JPL
204869	2007 RL_{275}	—	September 6, 2007	Siding Spring	SSS	(194)	2.3 km	MPC · JPL
204870	2007 RJ_{278}	—	September 5, 2007	Catalina	CSS	·	3.2 km	MPC · JPL
204871	2007 RB_{285}	—	September 12, 2007	Mount Lemmon	Mount Lemmon Survey	·	2.8 km	MPC · JPL
204872	2007 RE_{295}	—	September 14, 2007	Mount Lemmon	Mount Lemmon Survey	·	1.5 km	MPC · JPL
204873 FAIR	2007 SW_{1}	FAIR	September 17, 2007	Taunus	E. Schwab, R. Kling	·	1.3 km	MPC · JPL
204874	2007 SR_{4}	—	September 20, 2007	Altschwendt	W. Ries	·	2.4 km	MPC · JPL
204875	2007 SZ_{8}	—	September 18, 2007	Kitt Peak	Spacewatch	·	3.2 km	MPC · JPL
204876	2007 TZ_{1}	—	October 4, 2007	Mount Lemmon	Mount Lemmon Survey	THM	3.2 km	MPC · JPL
204877	2007 TF_{5}	—	October 4, 2007	Kitt Peak	Spacewatch	·	2.9 km	MPC · JPL
204878	2007 TE_{14}	—	October 3, 2007	Hibiscus	Hibiscus	·	3.9 km	MPC · JPL
204879	2007 TM_{32}	—	October 6, 2007	Kitt Peak	Spacewatch	·	1.4 km	MPC · JPL
204880	2007 TQ_{66}	—	October 10, 2007	Dauban	Chante-Perdrix	KOR	1.8 km	MPC · JPL
204881	2007 TR_{95}	—	October 7, 2007	Catalina	CSS	·	3.2 km	MPC · JPL
204882	2007 TJ_{127}	—	October 6, 2007	Kitt Peak	Spacewatch	THM	3.5 km	MPC · JPL
204883	2007 TR_{128}	—	October 6, 2007	Kitt Peak	Spacewatch	THM	3.2 km	MPC · JPL
204884	2007 TB_{136}	—	October 8, 2007	Catalina	CSS	·	5.4 km	MPC · JPL
204885	2007 TD_{144}	—	October 6, 2007	Socorro	LINEAR	·	2.8 km	MPC · JPL
204886	2007 TC_{145}	—	October 6, 2007	Socorro	LINEAR	·	1.6 km	MPC · JPL
204887	2007 TX_{148}	—	October 8, 2007	Socorro	LINEAR	·	2.7 km	MPC · JPL
204888	2007 TH_{187}	—	October 13, 2007	Socorro	LINEAR	·	4.6 km	MPC · JPL
204889	2007 TR_{269}	—	October 9, 2007	Kitt Peak	Spacewatch	·	2.7 km	MPC · JPL
204890	2007 TR_{305}	—	October 14, 2007	Mount Lemmon	Mount Lemmon Survey	(6769)	2.8 km	MPC · JPL
204891	2007 TY_{323}	—	October 11, 2007	Kitt Peak	Spacewatch	VER	4.5 km	MPC · JPL
204892	2007 TQ_{331}	—	October 11, 2007	Kitt Peak	Spacewatch	3:2	6.3 km	MPC · JPL
204893	2007 TD_{355}	—	October 11, 2007	Catalina	CSS	·	6.0 km	MPC · JPL
204894	2007 TF_{372}	—	October 13, 2007	Mount Lemmon	Mount Lemmon Survey	·	2.3 km	MPC · JPL
204895	2007 TS_{375}	—	October 15, 2007	Mount Lemmon	Mount Lemmon Survey	·	5.5 km	MPC · JPL
204896 Giorgiobocca	2007 UQ_{1}	Giorgiobocca	October 16, 2007	Vallemare Borbona	V. S. Casulli	·	5.6 km	MPC · JPL
204897	2007 UL_{19}	—	October 18, 2007	Mount Lemmon	Mount Lemmon Survey	KOR	1.7 km	MPC · JPL
204898	2007 UA_{30}	—	October 19, 2007	Anderson Mesa	LONEOS	PAD	2.7 km	MPC · JPL
204899	2007 UE_{56}	—	October 30, 2007	Mount Lemmon	Mount Lemmon Survey	·	2.7 km	MPC · JPL
204900	2007 UR_{90}	—	October 30, 2007	Mount Lemmon	Mount Lemmon Survey	KOR	1.9 km	MPC · JPL

== 204901–205000 ==
back to top

Designation			Discovery			Properties		Ref
Permanent	Provisional	Named after	Date	Site	Discoverer(s)	Category	Diam.	Ref
204901	2007 US_{93}	—	October 31, 2007	Mount Lemmon	Mount Lemmon Survey	KOR	2.3 km	MPC · JPL
204902	2007 UB_{126}	—	October 17, 2007	Catalina	CSS	·	4.2 km	MPC · JPL
204903	2007 UO_{133}	—	October 30, 2007	Catalina	CSS	slow	3.9 km	MPC · JPL
204904	2007 VS_{80}	—	November 4, 2007	Kitt Peak	Spacewatch	·	2.3 km	MPC · JPL
204905	2007 VR_{84}	—	November 7, 2007	La Sagra	OAM	·	6.0 km	MPC · JPL
204906	2007 VM_{270}	—	November 3, 2007	Kitt Peak	Spacewatch	·	4.1 km	MPC · JPL
204907	2007 VP_{291}	—	November 14, 2007	Kitt Peak	Spacewatch	·	3.7 km	MPC · JPL
204908	2007 WS_{10}	—	November 17, 2007	Catalina	CSS	EOS	2.9 km	MPC · JPL
204909	2008 DP_{43}	—	February 28, 2008	Mount Lemmon	Mount Lemmon Survey	V	1.1 km	MPC · JPL
204910	2008 HU_{12}	—	April 24, 2008	Kitt Peak	Spacewatch	·	3.2 km	MPC · JPL
204911	2008 QE_{5}	—	August 22, 2008	Kitt Peak	Spacewatch	L4	14 km	MPC · JPL
204912	2008 RH_{94}	—	September 6, 2008	Kitt Peak	Spacewatch	·	910 m	MPC · JPL
204913	2008 RG_{108}	—	September 9, 2008	Mount Lemmon	Mount Lemmon Survey	·	2.2 km	MPC · JPL
204914	2008 SQ_{35}	—	September 20, 2008	Kitt Peak	Spacewatch	·	2.6 km	MPC · JPL
204915	2008 ST_{52}	—	September 20, 2008	Mount Lemmon	Mount Lemmon Survey	·	3.1 km	MPC · JPL
204916	2008 SU_{54}	—	September 20, 2008	Mount Lemmon	Mount Lemmon Survey	MRX	1.5 km	MPC · JPL
204917	2008 SY_{82}	—	September 26, 2008	Bisei SG Center	BATTeRS	·	4.2 km	MPC · JPL
204918	2008 SW_{142}	—	September 24, 2008	Mount Lemmon	Mount Lemmon Survey	KOR	1.8 km	MPC · JPL
204919	2008 SH_{147}	—	September 24, 2008	Kitt Peak	Spacewatch	·	4.3 km	MPC · JPL
204920	2008 SR_{163}	—	September 28, 2008	Socorro	LINEAR	·	2.1 km	MPC · JPL
204921	2008 SE_{173}	—	September 22, 2008	Mount Lemmon	Mount Lemmon Survey	·	1.7 km	MPC · JPL
204922	2008 SY_{206}	—	September 26, 2008	Kitt Peak	Spacewatch	·	3.1 km	MPC · JPL
204923	2008 SZ_{260}	—	September 23, 2008	Kitt Peak	Spacewatch	·	2.4 km	MPC · JPL
204924	2008 SN_{266}	—	September 24, 2008	Catalina	CSS	·	2.5 km	MPC · JPL
204925	2008 TG_{5}	—	October 1, 2008	La Sagra	OAM	·	1.1 km	MPC · JPL
204926	2008 TX_{8}	—	October 6, 2008	Goodricke-Pigott	R. A. Tucker	·	4.2 km	MPC · JPL
204927	2008 TM_{52}	—	October 2, 2008	Kitt Peak	Spacewatch	L4	10 km	MPC · JPL
204928	2008 TZ_{68}	—	October 2, 2008	Kitt Peak	Spacewatch	·	2.2 km	MPC · JPL
204929	2008 TV_{82}	—	October 3, 2008	Kitt Peak	Spacewatch	V	950 m	MPC · JPL
204930	2008 TD_{105}	—	October 6, 2008	Kitt Peak	Spacewatch	·	2.0 km	MPC · JPL
204931	2008 UJ_{34}	—	October 20, 2008	Kitt Peak	Spacewatch	·	2.3 km	MPC · JPL
204932	2008 UV_{35}	—	October 20, 2008	Mount Lemmon	Mount Lemmon Survey	·	1.5 km	MPC · JPL
204933	2008 UE_{42}	—	October 20, 2008	Kitt Peak	Spacewatch	·	3.2 km	MPC · JPL
204934	2008 UO_{99}	—	October 29, 2008	Goodricke-Pigott	R. A. Tucker	·	2.5 km	MPC · JPL
204935	2008 UZ_{108}	—	October 21, 2008	Mount Lemmon	Mount Lemmon Survey	·	2.4 km	MPC · JPL
204936	2008 UG_{142}	—	October 23, 2008	Kitt Peak	Spacewatch	·	1.0 km	MPC · JPL
204937	2008 UF_{156}	—	October 23, 2008	Kitt Peak	Spacewatch	·	2.6 km	MPC · JPL
204938	2008 UW_{159}	—	October 23, 2008	Kitt Peak	Spacewatch	PAD	3.3 km	MPC · JPL
204939	2008 UV_{172}	—	October 24, 2008	Kitt Peak	Spacewatch	AGN	1.9 km	MPC · JPL
204940	2008 UR_{193}	—	October 25, 2008	Mount Lemmon	Mount Lemmon Survey	·	6.3 km	MPC · JPL
204941	2008 UD_{198}	—	October 24, 2008	Socorro	LINEAR	V	780 m	MPC · JPL
204942	2008 UT_{256}	—	October 27, 2008	Kitt Peak	Spacewatch	NYS	1.1 km	MPC · JPL
204943	2008 UA_{263}	—	October 27, 2008	Kitt Peak	Spacewatch	·	2.2 km	MPC · JPL
204944	2008 UM_{279}	—	October 28, 2008	Mount Lemmon	Mount Lemmon Survey	KOR	1.8 km	MPC · JPL
204945	2008 UB_{287}	—	October 28, 2008	Mount Lemmon	Mount Lemmon Survey	·	2.7 km	MPC · JPL
204946	2008 UN_{302}	—	October 29, 2008	Kitt Peak	Spacewatch	·	2.0 km	MPC · JPL
204947	2008 UE_{315}	—	October 30, 2008	Kitt Peak	Spacewatch	·	970 m	MPC · JPL
204948	2008 UG_{325}	—	October 31, 2008	Kitt Peak	Spacewatch	·	2.1 km	MPC · JPL
204949	2008 VT	—	November 2, 2008	Mayhill	Lowe, A.	·	5.8 km	MPC · JPL
204950	2008 VU_{46}	—	November 3, 2008	Kitt Peak	Spacewatch	·	3.8 km	MPC · JPL
204951	2008 VR_{53}	—	November 6, 2008	Catalina	CSS	·	1.0 km	MPC · JPL
204952	2008 VM_{57}	—	November 6, 2008	Mount Lemmon	Mount Lemmon Survey	·	4.0 km	MPC · JPL
204953	2008 WN_{4}	—	November 17, 2008	Kitt Peak	Spacewatch	·	1.9 km	MPC · JPL
204954	2008 WS_{24}	—	November 18, 2008	Catalina	CSS	TIR	5.1 km	MPC · JPL
204955	2008 WF_{60}	—	November 19, 2008	Socorro	LINEAR	·	2.1 km	MPC · JPL
204956	2008 WS_{61}	—	November 22, 2008	La Sagra	OAM	·	1.9 km	MPC · JPL
204957	2008 WK_{68}	—	November 18, 2008	Kitt Peak	Spacewatch	·	1.7 km	MPC · JPL
204958	2008 WQ_{88}	—	November 21, 2008	Kitt Peak	Spacewatch	·	3.4 km	MPC · JPL
204959	2008 WT_{98}	—	November 23, 2008	La Sagra	OAM	·	2.4 km	MPC · JPL
204960	4713 P-L	—	September 24, 1960	Palomar	C. J. van Houten, I. van Houten-Groeneveld, T. Gehrels	·	2.7 km	MPC · JPL
204961	6377 P-L	—	September 24, 1960	Palomar	C. J. van Houten, I. van Houten-Groeneveld, T. Gehrels	·	1.5 km	MPC · JPL
204962	5057 T-2	—	September 25, 1973	Palomar	C. J. van Houten, I. van Houten-Groeneveld, T. Gehrels	·	980 m	MPC · JPL
204963	1981 EW_{29}	—	March 2, 1981	Siding Spring	S. J. Bus	EUP	6.9 km	MPC · JPL
204964	1981 EN_{46}	—	March 2, 1981	Siding Spring	S. J. Bus	·	1.1 km	MPC · JPL
204965	1989 SY_{4}	—	September 26, 1989	La Silla	E. W. Elst	·	1.9 km	MPC · JPL
204966	1990 QX_{3}	—	August 22, 1990	Palomar	H. E. Holt	(5)	2.4 km	MPC · JPL
204967	1991 TH_{7}	—	October 3, 1991	Tautenburg	F. Börngen, L. D. Schmadel	·	1.0 km	MPC · JPL
204968	1991 TM_{11}	—	October 11, 1991	Kitt Peak	Spacewatch	·	1.4 km	MPC · JPL
204969	1991 VU_{11}	—	November 8, 1991	Kitt Peak	Spacewatch	·	2.8 km	MPC · JPL
204970	1992 DQ_{6}	—	February 29, 1992	La Silla	UESAC	·	3.3 km	MPC · JPL
204971	1993 FG_{9}	—	March 17, 1993	La Silla	UESAC	EOS ·	5.7 km	MPC · JPL
204972	1993 QV_{8}	—	August 20, 1993	La Silla	E. W. Elst	·	2.6 km	MPC · JPL
204973	1993 SN_{9}	—	September 22, 1993	La Silla	H. Debehogne, E. W. Elst	·	1.3 km	MPC · JPL
204974	1993 TO_{7}	—	October 9, 1993	Kitt Peak	Spacewatch	·	2.8 km	MPC · JPL
204975	1993 TW_{35}	—	October 11, 1993	La Silla	E. W. Elst	·	1.6 km	MPC · JPL
204976	1994 JT_{1}	—	May 1, 1994	Kitt Peak	Spacewatch	·	3.5 km	MPC · JPL
204977	1994 SZ_{8}	—	September 28, 1994	Kitt Peak	Spacewatch	·	880 m	MPC · JPL
204978	1994 SE_{12}	—	September 29, 1994	Kitt Peak	Spacewatch	·	1.5 km	MPC · JPL
204979	1994 TW_{10}	—	October 9, 1994	Kitt Peak	Spacewatch	·	2.0 km	MPC · JPL
204980	1994 TO_{11}	—	October 10, 1994	Kitt Peak	Spacewatch	·	1.4 km	MPC · JPL
204981	1995 EX_{6}	—	March 2, 1995	Kitt Peak	Spacewatch	·	1 km	MPC · JPL
204982	1995 FT_{3}	—	March 23, 1995	Kitt Peak	Spacewatch	·	2.1 km	MPC · JPL
204983	1995 GV_{4}	—	April 5, 1995	Kitt Peak	Spacewatch	·	1.0 km	MPC · JPL
204984	1995 UL_{9}	—	October 16, 1995	Kitt Peak	Spacewatch	(5)	1.5 km	MPC · JPL
204985	1995 UW_{13}	—	October 17, 1995	Kitt Peak	Spacewatch	·	1.1 km	MPC · JPL
204986	1995 UB_{22}	—	October 19, 1995	Kitt Peak	Spacewatch	·	3.5 km	MPC · JPL
204987	1995 UN_{40}	—	October 23, 1995	Kitt Peak	Spacewatch	·	1.7 km	MPC · JPL
204988	1995 US_{58}	—	October 18, 1995	Kitt Peak	Spacewatch	(5)	1.6 km	MPC · JPL
204989	1995 UX_{65}	—	October 17, 1995	Kitt Peak	Spacewatch	·	940 m	MPC · JPL
204990	1995 YP_{14}	—	December 20, 1995	Kitt Peak	Spacewatch	(5)	1.2 km	MPC · JPL
204991	1996 EZ_{3}	—	March 11, 1996	Kitt Peak	Spacewatch	·	2.8 km	MPC · JPL
204992	1996 ES_{4}	—	March 11, 1996	Kitt Peak	Spacewatch	PAD	1.9 km	MPC · JPL
204993	1996 EV_{9}	—	March 12, 1996	Kitt Peak	Spacewatch	·	3.1 km	MPC · JPL
204994	1996 RJ_{14}	—	September 8, 1996	Kitt Peak	Spacewatch	NYS	1.5 km	MPC · JPL
204995	1996 TZ_{2}	—	October 3, 1996	Xinglong	SCAP	·	7.0 km	MPC · JPL
204996	1996 TU_{5}	—	October 3, 1996	Xinglong	SCAP	·	1.8 km	MPC · JPL
204997	1996 VE_{13}	—	November 5, 1996	Kitt Peak	Spacewatch	NYS	2.4 km	MPC · JPL
204998	1996 VV_{13}	—	November 5, 1996	Kitt Peak	Spacewatch	·	2.1 km	MPC · JPL
204999	1996 VD_{14}	—	November 5, 1996	Kitt Peak	Spacewatch	·	1.4 km	MPC · JPL
205000	1996 VA_{16}	—	November 5, 1996	Kitt Peak	Spacewatch	·	1.6 km	MPC · JPL

back to top

== See also ==
- Meanings of minor-planet names: 204001–205000
