= Meanings of minor-planet names: 204001–205000 =

As minor planet discoveries are confirmed, they are given a permanent number by the IAU's Minor Planet Center (MPC), and the discoverers can then submit names for them, following the IAU's naming conventions. The list below concerns those minor planets in the specified number-range that have received names, and explains the meanings of those names.

Official naming citations of newly named small Solar System bodies are approved and published in a bulletin by IAU's Working Group for Small Bodies Nomenclature (WGSBN). Before May 2021, citations were published in MPC's Minor Planet Circulars for many decades. Recent citations can also be found on the JPL Small-Body Database (SBDB). Until his death in 2016, German astronomer Lutz D. Schmadel compiled these citations into the Dictionary of Minor Planet Names (DMP) and regularly updated the collection.

Based on Paul Herget's The Names of the Minor Planets, Schmadel also researched the unclear origin of numerous asteroids, most of which had been named prior to World War II. This article incorporates text from this source, which is in the public domain: SBDB New namings may only be added to this list below after official publication as the preannouncement of names is condemned. The WGSBN publishes a comprehensive guideline for the naming rules of non-cometary small Solar System bodies.

== 204001–204100 ==
Named minor planet	Provisional	This minor planet was named for...	Ref · Catalog
There are no named minor planets in this number range

== 204101–204200 ==
back to top

Named minor planet	Provisional	This minor planet was named for...	Ref · Catalog
There are no named minor planets in this number range

== 204201–204300 ==
back to top

Named minor planet	Provisional	This minor planet was named for...	Ref · Catalog
There are no named minor planets in this number range

== 204301–204400 ==
back to top

Named minor planet	Provisional	This minor planet was named for...	Ref · Catalog
204370 Ferdinandvaněk	2004 TH_{70}	Ferdinand Vaněk, a fictitious character in the play Audience by Czech writer, philosopher and dissident Václav Havel	JPL · 204370

== 204401–204500 ==
back to top

Named minor planet	Provisional	This minor planet was named for...	Ref · Catalog
There are no named minor planets in this number range

== 204501–204600 ==
back to top

Named minor planet	Provisional	This minor planet was named for...	Ref · Catalog
204570 Veronicabray	2005 EA_{317}	Veronica J. Bray (b. 1981), a British-American planetary scientist.	IAU · 204570

== 204601–204700 ==
back to top

Named minor planet	Provisional	This minor planet was named for...	Ref · Catalog
204602 Lawrencebrown	2005 GC_{205}	Lawrence E. Brown (b. 1963), a senior software engineer at the Johns Hopkins University Applied Physics Laboratory.	IAU · 204602
204632 Jamesburch	2005 XY_{114}	James L. Burch (b. 1942), an American space physicist.	IAU · 204632

== 204701–204800 ==
back to top

Named minor planet	Provisional	This minor planet was named for...	Ref · Catalog
204702 Péquignat	2006 FN_{9}	Pierre Péquignat (1669–1740), one of the most popular heroes for people living in Jura Switzerland.	JPL · 204702
204705 Pagan	2006 FY_{37}	Pagan, the historical English name for Bagan, the ancient city in central Myanmar.	IAU · 204705
204710 Gaoxing	2006 GE	Gao Xing (born 1974), a Chinese amateur astronomer and founder of the Xingming Observatory (C42) of Ürümqi.	JPL · 204710
204711 Luojialun	2006 GN	Luo Jialun (1897–1969) was a Chinese educator, historian, thinker and diplomat. He was President of National Central University from 1932 to 1941.	JPL · 204711
204764 Lindaburke	2006 JW_{59}	Linda M. Burke (b. 1965), an American staff engineer at Johns Hopkins University Applied Physics Laboratory.	IAU · 204764
204786 Wehlau	2006 KU_{131}	William Henry Wehlau (1926–1995), an American-born Canadian astronomer	JPL · 204786

== 204801–204900 ==
back to top

Named minor planet	Provisional	This minor planet was named for...	Ref · Catalog
204805 Šipöcz	2006 TS_{9}	Tibor Šipöcz (born 1950) is a Slovak physicist and senior lecturer, formerly at the Faculty of Mathematics, Physics and Informatics, Comenius University in Bratislava.	JPL · 204805
204816 Andreacamilleri	2007 OZ	Andrea Camilleri (1925–2019), an Italian writer, screenwriter and director who received a number of honorary degrees from several Italian universities	JPL · 204816
204831 Levski	2007 PQ_{28}	Vasil Levski (1837–1873), national hero of Bulgaria and styled the Apostle of Freedom.	JPL · 204831
204836 Xiexiaosi	2007 QS_{1}	Xie Xiaosi (1905–2008), known as the Guardian of World Cultural Heritage, was a famous Chinese garden landscape artist and painter.	JPL · 204836
204839 Suzhouyuanlin	2007 QK_{13}	Suzhou Yuanlin, Suzhou Chinese-style gardens, are typical ancient gardens with traditional Chinese architectures and cultures.	JPL · 204839
204842 Fengchia	2007 RN_{19}	Feng Chia University, located in central Taiwan, is a university characterized by educational excellence and breakthrough research.	JPL · 204842
204852 Frankfurt	2007 RH_{133}	The German city of Frankfurt in Hesse	JPL · 204852
204873 FAIR	2007 SW_{1}	The Facility for Antiproton and Ion Research (FAIR), an international science center for studying the building blocks of matter and the evolution of the universe	JPL · 204873
204896 Giorgiobocca	2007 UQ_{1}	Giorgio Bocca (1920–2011), an Italian essayist and journalist, also known for his participation in the World War II partisan movement.	JPL · 204896

== 204901–205000 ==
back to top

Named minor planet	Provisional	This minor planet was named for...	Ref · Catalog
There are no named minor planets in this number range

back to top

Preceded by 203,001–204,000	Meanings of minor-planet names List of minor planets: 204,001–205,000	Succeeded by 205,001–206,000
