= List of minor planets: 201001–202000 =

The following is a partial list of minor planets, running from minor-planet number 201001 through 202000, inclusive. The primary data for this and other partial lists is based on JPL's "Small-Body Orbital Elements" and data available from the Minor Planet Center. Critical list information is also provided by the MPC, unless otherwise specified from Lowell Observatory. A detailed description of the table's columns and additional sources are given on the main page including a complete list of every page in this series, and a statistical break-up on the dynamical classification of minor planets.

Also see the summary list of all named bodies in numerical and alphabetical order, and the corresponding naming citations for the number range of this particular list. New namings may only be added to this list after official publication, as the preannouncement of names is condemned by the Working Group for Small Bodies Nomenclature of the International Astronomical Union.

Near-Earth obj.	MBA (inner)	MBA (outer)	Centaur
Mars-crosser	MBA (middle)	Jupiter trojan	Trans-Neptunian obj.
Unclassified

== 201001–201100 ==
Designation			Discovery			Properties		Ref
Permanent	Provisional	Named after	Date	Site	Discoverer(s)	Category	Diam.	Ref
201001	2002 CL_{168}	—	February 8, 2002	Socorro	LINEAR	·	1.6 km	MPC · JPL
201002	2002 CW_{170}	—	February 8, 2002	Socorro	LINEAR	NYS	2.1 km	MPC · JPL
201003	2002 CL_{172}	—	February 8, 2002	Socorro	LINEAR	·	2.7 km	MPC · JPL
201004	2002 CD_{175}	—	February 10, 2002	Socorro	LINEAR	·	1.2 km	MPC · JPL
201005	2002 CY_{176}	—	February 10, 2002	Socorro	LINEAR	SUL	2.9 km	MPC · JPL
201006	2002 CH_{185}	—	February 10, 2002	Socorro	LINEAR	L4	10 km	MPC · JPL
201007	2002 CL_{190}	—	February 10, 2002	Socorro	LINEAR	V	870 m	MPC · JPL
201008	2002 CQ_{205}	—	February 10, 2002	Socorro	LINEAR	MAS	920 m	MPC · JPL
201009	2002 CA_{211}	—	February 10, 2002	Socorro	LINEAR	·	1.3 km	MPC · JPL
201010	2002 CK_{215}	—	February 10, 2002	Socorro	LINEAR	NYS	1.7 km	MPC · JPL
201011	2002 CE_{219}	—	February 10, 2002	Socorro	LINEAR	·	1.7 km	MPC · JPL
201012	2002 CU_{222}	—	February 11, 2002	Socorro	LINEAR	·	2.2 km	MPC · JPL
201013	2002 CJ_{225}	—	February 15, 2002	Bergisch Gladbach	W. Bickel	·	1.4 km	MPC · JPL
201014	2002 CL_{226}	—	February 3, 2002	Haleakala	NEAT	·	2.1 km	MPC · JPL
201015	2002 CF_{228}	—	February 6, 2002	Palomar	NEAT	·	1.8 km	MPC · JPL
201016	2002 CY_{241}	—	February 11, 2002	Socorro	LINEAR	·	3.0 km	MPC · JPL
201017	2002 CU_{252}	—	February 4, 2002	Palomar	NEAT	·	1.3 km	MPC · JPL
201018	2002 CW_{256}	—	February 4, 2002	Palomar	NEAT	·	2.0 km	MPC · JPL
201019 Oliverwhite	2002 CZ_{257}	Oliverwhite	February 6, 2002	Kitt Peak	M. W. Buie	MAS	880 m	MPC · JPL
201020	2002 CG_{259}	—	February 6, 2002	Socorro	LINEAR	PHO	2.2 km	MPC · JPL
201021	2002 CJ_{259}	—	February 6, 2002	Socorro	LINEAR	PHO	3.0 km	MPC · JPL
201022	2002 CT_{261}	—	February 7, 2002	Haleakala	NEAT	NYS	1.6 km	MPC · JPL
201023 Karlwhittenburg	2002 CZ_{264}	Karlwhittenburg	February 8, 2002	Kitt Peak	M. W. Buie	·	1.9 km	MPC · JPL
201024	2002 CL_{280}	—	February 7, 2002	Haleakala	NEAT	·	1.5 km	MPC · JPL
201025	2002 CB_{282}	—	February 8, 2002	Kitt Peak	Spacewatch	·	2.4 km	MPC · JPL
201026	2002 CD_{282}	—	February 8, 2002	Kitt Peak	Spacewatch	·	1.3 km	MPC · JPL
201027	2002 CQ_{284}	—	February 9, 2002	Kitt Peak	Spacewatch	MAS	1.2 km	MPC · JPL
201028	2002 CE_{292}	—	February 11, 2002	Socorro	LINEAR	MAS	880 m	MPC · JPL
201029	2002 CM_{292}	—	February 11, 2002	Socorro	LINEAR	·	1.4 km	MPC · JPL
201030	2002 CX_{295}	—	February 10, 2002	Socorro	LINEAR	·	1.4 km	MPC · JPL
201031	2002 CL_{306}	—	February 7, 2002	Haleakala	NEAT	·	1.6 km	MPC · JPL
201032	2002 DC_{7}	—	February 20, 2002	Kitt Peak	Spacewatch	·	1.6 km	MPC · JPL
201033	2002 DJ_{10}	—	February 20, 2002	Socorro	LINEAR	·	1.4 km	MPC · JPL
201034	2002 DF_{11}	—	February 20, 2002	Socorro	LINEAR	·	2.0 km	MPC · JPL
201035	2002 DJ_{13}	—	February 16, 2002	Palomar	NEAT	·	2.0 km	MPC · JPL
201036	2002 DP_{13}	—	February 16, 2002	Palomar	NEAT	MAS	880 m	MPC · JPL
201037	2002 DW_{14}	—	February 16, 2002	Palomar	NEAT	·	2.2 km	MPC · JPL
201038	2002 DO_{17}	—	February 19, 2002	Kitt Peak	Spacewatch	·	1.6 km	MPC · JPL
201039	2002 ES_{5}	—	March 9, 2002	Palomar	NEAT	L4	10 km	MPC · JPL
201040	2002 EX_{7}	—	March 10, 2002	Haleakala	NEAT	L4	17 km	MPC · JPL
201041	2002 EB_{14}	—	March 5, 2002	Palomar	NEAT	·	1.7 km	MPC · JPL
201042	2002 ET_{14}	—	March 5, 2002	Kitt Peak	Spacewatch	·	1.8 km	MPC · JPL
201043	2002 EJ_{15}	—	March 5, 2002	Palomar	NEAT	·	1.5 km	MPC · JPL
201044	2002 EK_{17}	—	March 5, 2002	Kitt Peak	Spacewatch	·	2.9 km	MPC · JPL
201045	2002 EM_{17}	—	March 5, 2002	Kitt Peak	Spacewatch	MAS	1.1 km	MPC · JPL
201046	2002 EA_{23}	—	March 5, 2002	Kitt Peak	Spacewatch	MAS	760 m	MPC · JPL
201047	2002 EY_{25}	—	March 10, 2002	Anderson Mesa	LONEOS	MAS	930 m	MPC · JPL
201048	2002 EU_{32}	—	March 11, 2002	Palomar	NEAT	·	2.1 km	MPC · JPL
201049	2002 EY_{32}	—	March 11, 2002	Palomar	NEAT	·	2.1 km	MPC · JPL
201050	2002 EV_{33}	—	March 11, 2002	Palomar	NEAT	·	2.3 km	MPC · JPL
201051	2002 ED_{35}	—	March 11, 2002	Palomar	NEAT	·	1.7 km	MPC · JPL
201052	2002 EO_{39}	—	March 9, 2002	Socorro	LINEAR	·	2.2 km	MPC · JPL
201053	2002 EL_{43}	—	March 12, 2002	Socorro	LINEAR	·	1.9 km	MPC · JPL
201054	2002 ED_{55}	—	March 12, 2002	Socorro	LINEAR	·	2.3 km	MPC · JPL
201055	2002 ED_{57}	—	March 13, 2002	Socorro	LINEAR	·	1.7 km	MPC · JPL
201056	2002 EY_{57}	—	March 13, 2002	Socorro	LINEAR	NYS	1.7 km	MPC · JPL
201057	2002 EW_{61}	—	March 13, 2002	Socorro	LINEAR	NYS	1.4 km	MPC · JPL
201058	2002 ET_{71}	—	March 13, 2002	Socorro	LINEAR	NYS	1.6 km	MPC · JPL
201059	2002 EG_{73}	—	March 13, 2002	Socorro	LINEAR	·	1.4 km	MPC · JPL
201060	2002 EZ_{84}	—	March 9, 2002	Socorro	LINEAR	·	1.7 km	MPC · JPL
201061	2002 EX_{85}	—	March 9, 2002	Socorro	LINEAR	NYS	1.9 km	MPC · JPL
201062	2002 EZ_{89}	—	March 12, 2002	Socorro	LINEAR	·	1.6 km	MPC · JPL
201063	2002 EV_{90}	—	March 12, 2002	Socorro	LINEAR	·	1.6 km	MPC · JPL
201064	2002 ED_{92}	—	March 13, 2002	Socorro	LINEAR	·	3.1 km	MPC · JPL
201065	2002 EK_{99}	—	March 4, 2002	Anderson Mesa	LONEOS	·	1.9 km	MPC · JPL
201066	2002 EN_{103}	—	March 9, 2002	Anderson Mesa	LONEOS	·	1.5 km	MPC · JPL
201067	2002 EJ_{105}	—	March 9, 2002	Kitt Peak	Spacewatch	NYS	1.7 km	MPC · JPL
201068	2002 EF_{110}	—	March 9, 2002	Catalina	CSS	ERI	2.3 km	MPC · JPL
201069	2002 EQ_{114}	—	March 10, 2002	Kitt Peak	Spacewatch	MAS	1.2 km	MPC · JPL
201070	2002 EM_{120}	—	March 11, 2002	Kitt Peak	Spacewatch	·	2.1 km	MPC · JPL
201071	2002 EP_{122}	—	March 12, 2002	Palomar	NEAT	·	1.4 km	MPC · JPL
201072	2002 EM_{129}	—	March 13, 2002	Socorro	LINEAR	EUN	1.7 km	MPC · JPL
201073	2002 EF_{161}	—	March 12, 2002	Apache Point	SDSS	·	2.6 km	MPC · JPL
201074	2002 FZ	—	March 18, 2002	Desert Eagle	W. K. Y. Yeung	·	3.4 km	MPC · JPL
201075	2002 FG_{2}	—	March 19, 2002	Desert Eagle	W. K. Y. Yeung	NYS	2.0 km	MPC · JPL
201076	2002 FX_{10}	—	March 16, 2002	Socorro	LINEAR	MAS	900 m	MPC · JPL
201077	2002 FE_{12}	—	March 16, 2002	Socorro	LINEAR	·	2.4 km	MPC · JPL
201078	2002 FU_{21}	—	March 19, 2002	Anderson Mesa	LONEOS	·	1.5 km	MPC · JPL
201079	2002 FY_{25}	—	March 19, 2002	Palomar	NEAT	·	2.8 km	MPC · JPL
201080	2002 FG_{26}	—	March 19, 2002	Palomar	NEAT	MAR	1.8 km	MPC · JPL
201081	2002 GC_{2}	—	April 4, 2002	Socorro	LINEAR	·	2.4 km	MPC · JPL
201082	2002 GA_{27}	—	April 15, 2002	Kitt Peak	Spacewatch	·	1.8 km	MPC · JPL
201083	2002 GE_{51}	—	April 5, 2002	Anderson Mesa	LONEOS	·	2.2 km	MPC · JPL
201084	2002 GL_{56}	—	April 5, 2002	Palomar	NEAT	·	1.6 km	MPC · JPL
201085	2002 GN_{58}	—	April 8, 2002	Palomar	NEAT	MAS	1.1 km	MPC · JPL
201086	2002 GJ_{59}	—	April 8, 2002	Palomar	NEAT	·	1.8 km	MPC · JPL
201087	2002 GU_{69}	—	April 8, 2002	Palomar	NEAT	·	1.8 km	MPC · JPL
201088	2002 GG_{70}	—	April 8, 2002	Palomar	NEAT	·	2.6 km	MPC · JPL
201089	2002 GU_{77}	—	April 9, 2002	Socorro	LINEAR	·	3.8 km	MPC · JPL
201090	2002 GH_{88}	—	April 10, 2002	Socorro	LINEAR	·	2.9 km	MPC · JPL
201091	2002 GS_{92}	—	April 9, 2002	Socorro	LINEAR	·	2.0 km	MPC · JPL
201092	2002 GK_{94}	—	April 9, 2002	Socorro	LINEAR	(5)	3.1 km	MPC · JPL
201093	2002 GT_{94}	—	April 9, 2002	Socorro	LINEAR	·	1.4 km	MPC · JPL
201094	2002 GD_{97}	—	April 9, 2002	Socorro	LINEAR	·	1.8 km	MPC · JPL
201095	2002 GC_{103}	—	April 10, 2002	Socorro	LINEAR	MAS	970 m	MPC · JPL
201096	2002 GB_{109}	—	April 11, 2002	Palomar	NEAT	·	3.5 km	MPC · JPL
201097	2002 GY_{114}	—	April 11, 2002	Socorro	LINEAR	·	1.9 km	MPC · JPL
201098	2002 GU_{122}	—	April 10, 2002	Socorro	LINEAR	NYS	2.0 km	MPC · JPL
201099	2002 GG_{127}	—	April 12, 2002	Socorro	LINEAR	·	1.9 km	MPC · JPL
201100	2002 GU_{128}	—	April 12, 2002	Socorro	LINEAR	·	2.1 km	MPC · JPL

== 201101–201200 ==
back to top

Designation			Discovery			Properties		Ref
Permanent	Provisional	Named after	Date	Site	Discoverer(s)	Category	Diam.	Ref
201101	2002 GU_{131}	—	April 12, 2002	Socorro	LINEAR	·	1.8 km	MPC · JPL
201102	2002 GP_{142}	—	April 13, 2002	Palomar	NEAT	·	1.6 km	MPC · JPL
201103	2002 GQ_{145}	—	April 12, 2002	Socorro	LINEAR	·	2.7 km	MPC · JPL
201104	2002 GD_{149}	—	April 14, 2002	Palomar	NEAT	·	2.7 km	MPC · JPL
201105	2002 GH_{149}	—	April 14, 2002	Socorro	LINEAR	·	1.6 km	MPC · JPL
201106	2002 GS_{154}	—	April 13, 2002	Palomar	NEAT	·	1.8 km	MPC · JPL
201107	2002 GD_{163}	—	April 14, 2002	Palomar	NEAT	NYS	1.9 km	MPC · JPL
201108	2002 GX_{174}	—	April 11, 2002	Socorro	LINEAR	·	3.3 km	MPC · JPL
201109	2002 GY_{178}	—	April 10, 2002	Palomar	NEAT	·	1.9 km	MPC · JPL
201110	2002 GP_{181}	—	April 2, 2002	Kitt Peak	Spacewatch	·	1.5 km	MPC · JPL
201111	2002 GU_{183}	—	April 9, 2002	Palomar	NEAT	·	2.2 km	MPC · JPL
201112	2002 HG	—	April 16, 2002	Ondřejov	P. Pravec	·	2.3 km	MPC · JPL
201113	2002 HN_{3}	—	April 16, 2002	Socorro	LINEAR	·	2.2 km	MPC · JPL
201114	2002 HL_{16}	—	April 18, 2002	Kitt Peak	Spacewatch	WIT	1.6 km	MPC · JPL
201115	2002 JX_{12}	—	May 8, 2002	Desert Eagle	W. K. Y. Yeung	·	4.6 km	MPC · JPL
201116	2002 JV_{13}	—	May 8, 2002	Socorro	LINEAR	H	820 m	MPC · JPL
201117	2002 JQ_{20}	—	May 7, 2002	Palomar	NEAT	·	2.2 km	MPC · JPL
201118	2002 JE_{28}	—	May 9, 2002	Socorro	LINEAR	·	2.3 km	MPC · JPL
201119	2002 JW_{32}	—	May 9, 2002	Socorro	LINEAR	·	3.8 km	MPC · JPL
201120	2002 JF_{35}	—	May 9, 2002	Socorro	LINEAR	·	2.3 km	MPC · JPL
201121	2002 JQ_{40}	—	May 8, 2002	Socorro	LINEAR	KON	3.8 km	MPC · JPL
201122	2002 JL_{44}	—	May 9, 2002	Socorro	LINEAR	·	2.1 km	MPC · JPL
201123	2002 JZ_{44}	—	May 9, 2002	Socorro	LINEAR	·	3.1 km	MPC · JPL
201124	2002 JE_{45}	—	May 9, 2002	Socorro	LINEAR	·	2.0 km	MPC · JPL
201125	2002 JK_{54}	—	May 9, 2002	Socorro	LINEAR	RAF	1.6 km	MPC · JPL
201126	2002 JL_{54}	—	May 9, 2002	Socorro	LINEAR	·	1.7 km	MPC · JPL
201127	2002 JR_{61}	—	May 8, 2002	Socorro	LINEAR	·	2.1 km	MPC · JPL
201128	2002 JX_{63}	—	May 9, 2002	Socorro	LINEAR	RAF · fast	2.1 km	MPC · JPL
201129	2002 JW_{68}	—	May 6, 2002	Socorro	LINEAR	PHO	2.1 km	MPC · JPL
201130	2002 JW_{69}	—	May 7, 2002	Socorro	LINEAR	·	2.0 km	MPC · JPL
201131	2002 JT_{76}	—	May 11, 2002	Socorro	LINEAR	·	1.5 km	MPC · JPL
201132	2002 JT_{78}	—	May 11, 2002	Socorro	LINEAR	·	2.3 km	MPC · JPL
201133	2002 JZ_{81}	—	May 11, 2002	Socorro	LINEAR	MAS	1.2 km	MPC · JPL
201134	2002 JO_{82}	—	May 11, 2002	Socorro	LINEAR	·	2.9 km	MPC · JPL
201135	2002 JV_{84}	—	May 11, 2002	Socorro	LINEAR	·	1.7 km	MPC · JPL
201136	2002 JW_{93}	—	May 11, 2002	Socorro	LINEAR	·	3.0 km	MPC · JPL
201137	2002 JJ_{97}	—	May 12, 2002	Palomar	NEAT	·	2.9 km	MPC · JPL
201138	2002 JV_{97}	—	May 8, 2002	Socorro	LINEAR	·	2.8 km	MPC · JPL
201139	2002 JH_{98}	—	May 9, 2002	Socorro	LINEAR	·	4.6 km	MPC · JPL
201140	2002 JE_{101}	—	May 6, 2002	Socorro	LINEAR	·	3.3 km	MPC · JPL
201141	2002 JL_{103}	—	May 10, 2002	Socorro	LINEAR	·	2.1 km	MPC · JPL
201142	2002 JY_{105}	—	May 13, 2002	Socorro	LINEAR	·	3.1 km	MPC · JPL
201143	2002 JQ_{110}	—	May 11, 2002	Socorro	LINEAR	·	2.1 km	MPC · JPL
201144	2002 JB_{118}	—	May 4, 2002	Palomar	NEAT	H	730 m	MPC · JPL
201145	2002 JD_{125}	—	May 7, 2002	Palomar	NEAT	MAS	1.1 km	MPC · JPL
201146	2002 JM_{127}	—	May 7, 2002	Anderson Mesa	LONEOS	EUN	1.7 km	MPC · JPL
201147	2002 JO_{127}	—	May 7, 2002	Palomar	NEAT	·	1.8 km	MPC · JPL
201148	2002 JK_{130}	—	May 8, 2002	Socorro	LINEAR	·	4.1 km	MPC · JPL
201149	2002 JP_{138}	—	May 9, 2002	Palomar	NEAT	·	1.5 km	MPC · JPL
201150	2002 JP_{143}	—	May 13, 2002	Palomar	NEAT	·	2.9 km	MPC · JPL
201151	2002 JD_{147}	—	May 14, 2002	Anderson Mesa	LONEOS	·	3.7 km	MPC · JPL
201152	2002 KL	—	May 16, 2002	Socorro	LINEAR	·	4.3 km	MPC · JPL
201153	2002 KP_{4}	—	May 16, 2002	Socorro	LINEAR	·	1.8 km	MPC · JPL
201154	2002 KX_{4}	—	May 16, 2002	Socorro	LINEAR	·	1.7 km	MPC · JPL
201155	2002 KL_{5}	—	May 16, 2002	Socorro	LINEAR	·	3.0 km	MPC · JPL
201156	2002 KX_{12}	—	May 18, 2002	Socorro	LINEAR	NYS	2.2 km	MPC · JPL
201157	2002 LO_{14}	—	June 6, 2002	Socorro	LINEAR	·	1.9 km	MPC · JPL
201158	2002 LQ_{15}	—	June 6, 2002	Socorro	LINEAR	JUN	1.4 km	MPC · JPL
201159	2002 LC_{18}	—	June 6, 2002	Socorro	LINEAR	·	1.6 km	MPC · JPL
201160	2002 LK_{32}	—	June 9, 2002	Palomar	NEAT	·	2.8 km	MPC · JPL
201161	2002 LF_{35}	—	June 11, 2002	Fountain Hills	C. W. Juels, P. R. Holvorcem	T_{j} (2.98)	10 km	MPC · JPL
201162	2002 LN_{41}	—	June 10, 2002	Socorro	LINEAR	·	3.9 km	MPC · JPL
201163	2002 LG_{44}	—	June 12, 2002	Palomar	NEAT	·	3.1 km	MPC · JPL
201164	2002 MN_{5}	—	June 27, 2002	Palomar	NEAT	EUN	2.1 km	MPC · JPL
201165	2002 NA_{7}	—	July 9, 2002	Palomar	NEAT	·	3.2 km	MPC · JPL
201166	2002 NP_{20}	—	July 9, 2002	Socorro	LINEAR	·	4.3 km	MPC · JPL
201167	2002 NU_{30}	—	July 8, 2002	Palomar	NEAT	·	4.8 km	MPC · JPL
201168	2002 NL_{50}	—	July 14, 2002	Palomar	NEAT	·	4.0 km	MPC · JPL
201169	2002 NE_{58}	—	July 14, 2002	Palomar	NEAT	·	2.7 km	MPC · JPL
201170	2002 NM_{61}	—	July 5, 2002	Socorro	LINEAR	·	6.0 km	MPC · JPL
201171	2002 NJ_{63}	—	July 9, 2002	Palomar	NEAT	·	2.4 km	MPC · JPL
201172	2002 OC_{3}	—	July 17, 2002	Socorro	LINEAR	H	1.3 km	MPC · JPL
201173	2002 OT_{6}	—	July 20, 2002	Palomar	NEAT	·	2.9 km	MPC · JPL
201174	2002 OQ_{15}	—	July 18, 2002	Socorro	LINEAR	EOS	2.6 km	MPC · JPL
201175	2002 OW_{16}	—	July 18, 2002	Socorro	LINEAR	·	3.5 km	MPC · JPL
201176	2002 OO_{26}	—	July 30, 2002	Haleakala	NEAT	·	3.1 km	MPC · JPL
201177	2002 OF_{29}	—	July 21, 2002	Palomar	NEAT	·	3.7 km	MPC · JPL
201178	2002 PA_{5}	—	August 4, 2002	Palomar	NEAT	·	5.6 km	MPC · JPL
201179	2002 PW_{9}	—	August 5, 2002	Palomar	NEAT	·	2.6 km	MPC · JPL
201180	2002 PH_{10}	—	August 5, 2002	Palomar	NEAT	·	5.3 km	MPC · JPL
201181	2002 PT_{26}	—	August 6, 2002	Palomar	NEAT	EOS	2.9 km	MPC · JPL
201182	2002 PR_{33}	—	August 6, 2002	Campo Imperatore	CINEOS	·	5.1 km	MPC · JPL
201183	2002 PV_{42}	—	August 7, 2002	Palomar	NEAT	·	5.0 km	MPC · JPL
201184	2002 PW_{52}	—	August 8, 2002	Palomar	NEAT	EOS	4.4 km	MPC · JPL
201185	2002 PO_{66}	—	August 6, 2002	Palomar	NEAT	·	3.9 km	MPC · JPL
201186	2002 PN_{69}	—	August 11, 2002	Socorro	LINEAR	·	4.7 km	MPC · JPL
201187	2002 PK_{70}	—	August 11, 2002	Socorro	LINEAR	slow	6.9 km	MPC · JPL
201188	2002 PT_{73}	—	August 12, 2002	Socorro	LINEAR	·	3.5 km	MPC · JPL
201189	2002 PV_{73}	—	August 12, 2002	Socorro	LINEAR	·	5.5 km	MPC · JPL
201190	2002 PF_{75}	—	August 12, 2002	Socorro	LINEAR	·	4.5 km	MPC · JPL
201191	2002 PK_{75}	—	August 12, 2002	Socorro	LINEAR	EOS	2.9 km	MPC · JPL
201192	2002 PR_{89}	—	August 11, 2002	Socorro	LINEAR	·	3.5 km	MPC · JPL
201193	2002 PH_{91}	—	August 13, 2002	Socorro	LINEAR	·	4.3 km	MPC · JPL
201194	2002 PR_{94}	—	August 12, 2002	Haleakala	NEAT	·	2.8 km	MPC · JPL
201195	2002 PN_{104}	—	August 12, 2002	Socorro	LINEAR	·	3.1 km	MPC · JPL
201196	2002 PP_{105}	—	August 12, 2002	Socorro	LINEAR	·	2.8 km	MPC · JPL
201197	2002 PF_{111}	—	August 13, 2002	Anderson Mesa	LONEOS	CYB	8.1 km	MPC · JPL
201198	2002 PD_{123}	—	August 15, 2002	Palomar	NEAT	·	5.4 km	MPC · JPL
201199	2002 PE_{123}	—	August 15, 2002	Palomar	NEAT	·	2.7 km	MPC · JPL
201200	2002 PP_{129}	—	August 15, 2002	Palomar	NEAT	·	2.9 km	MPC · JPL

== 201201–201300 ==
back to top

Designation			Discovery			Properties		Ref
Permanent	Provisional	Named after	Date	Site	Discoverer(s)	Category	Diam.	Ref
201201	2002 PM_{131}	—	August 14, 2002	Palomar	NEAT	·	6.0 km	MPC · JPL
201202	2002 PC_{137}	—	August 15, 2002	Palomar	NEAT	EOS	2.6 km	MPC · JPL
201203	2002 PF_{138}	—	August 15, 2002	Palomar	NEAT	EOS	2.1 km	MPC · JPL
201204 Stevewilliams	2002 PZ_{148}	Stevewilliams	August 10, 2002	Cerro Tololo	M. W. Buie	·	2.3 km	MPC · JPL
201205	2002 PO_{155}	—	August 8, 2002	Palomar	S. F. Hönig	MIS	3.3 km	MPC · JPL
201206	2002 PJ_{165}	—	August 8, 2002	Palomar	Lowe, A.	·	2.1 km	MPC · JPL
201207	2002 PN_{167}	—	August 8, 2002	Palomar	NEAT	·	2.5 km	MPC · JPL
201208	2002 PS_{171}	—	August 8, 2002	Palomar	NEAT	·	2.2 km	MPC · JPL
201209	2002 PY_{171}	—	August 15, 2002	Palomar	NEAT	KOR	1.8 km	MPC · JPL
201210	2002 PW_{182}	—	August 4, 2002	Palomar	NEAT	·	3.0 km	MPC · JPL
201211	2002 PJ_{185}	—	August 3, 2002	Campo Imperatore	CINEOS	EUN	1.8 km	MPC · JPL
201212	2002 QT_{13}	—	August 26, 2002	Palomar	NEAT	·	4.6 km	MPC · JPL
201213	2002 QZ_{31}	—	August 29, 2002	Palomar	NEAT	EOS	3.5 km	MPC · JPL
201214	2002 QD_{41}	—	August 29, 2002	Palomar	NEAT	·	5.7 km	MPC · JPL
201215	2002 QL_{45}	—	August 31, 2002	Socorro	LINEAR	·	3.5 km	MPC · JPL
201216	2002 QX_{45}	—	August 31, 2002	Anderson Mesa	LONEOS	EMA	4.8 km	MPC · JPL
201217	2002 QZ_{48}	—	August 29, 2002	Palomar	R. Matson	·	4.2 km	MPC · JPL
201218	2002 QW_{56}	—	August 29, 2002	Palomar	S. F. Hönig	KOR	2.4 km	MPC · JPL
201219	2002 QV_{57}	—	August 28, 2002	Palomar	Lowe, A.	TEL	1.8 km	MPC · JPL
201220	2002 QP_{64}	—	August 18, 2002	Palomar	NEAT	·	3.0 km	MPC · JPL
201221	2002 QU_{65}	—	August 26, 2002	Palomar	NEAT	·	2.5 km	MPC · JPL
201222	2002 QX_{78}	—	August 20, 2002	Palomar	NEAT	·	3.4 km	MPC · JPL
201223	2002 QE_{85}	—	August 17, 2002	Palomar	NEAT	·	3.3 km	MPC · JPL
201224	2002 QQ_{98}	—	August 29, 2002	Palomar	NEAT	·	2.9 km	MPC · JPL
201225	2002 QA_{101}	—	August 26, 2002	Palomar	NEAT	·	3.1 km	MPC · JPL
201226	2002 QA_{103}	—	August 30, 2002	Anderson Mesa	LONEOS	·	5.7 km	MPC · JPL
201227	2002 QB_{105}	—	August 27, 2002	Palomar	NEAT	·	2.1 km	MPC · JPL
201228	2002 QZ_{105}	—	August 19, 2002	Palomar	NEAT	GEF	1.9 km	MPC · JPL
201229	2002 QJ_{118}	—	August 30, 2002	Palomar	NEAT	·	2.1 km	MPC · JPL
201230	2002 QD_{123}	—	August 19, 2002	Palomar	NEAT	·	3.9 km	MPC · JPL
201231	2002 QV_{128}	—	August 29, 2002	Palomar	NEAT	(1298)	4.5 km	MPC · JPL
201232	2002 RV_{5}	—	September 3, 2002	Palomar	NEAT	·	3.1 km	MPC · JPL
201233	2002 RR_{8}	—	September 3, 2002	Campo Imperatore	CINEOS	·	4.2 km	MPC · JPL
201234	2002 RS_{16}	—	September 4, 2002	Anderson Mesa	LONEOS	·	5.9 km	MPC · JPL
201235	2002 RR_{22}	—	September 4, 2002	Anderson Mesa	LONEOS	·	4.7 km	MPC · JPL
201236	2002 RG_{24}	—	September 4, 2002	Anderson Mesa	LONEOS	·	3.2 km	MPC · JPL
201237	2002 RR_{32}	—	September 4, 2002	Anderson Mesa	LONEOS	·	3.3 km	MPC · JPL
201238	2002 RN_{42}	—	September 5, 2002	Socorro	LINEAR	·	4.0 km	MPC · JPL
201239	2002 RM_{43}	—	September 5, 2002	Socorro	LINEAR	EOS	2.9 km	MPC · JPL
201240	2002 RY_{45}	—	September 5, 2002	Socorro	LINEAR	·	3.6 km	MPC · JPL
201241	2002 RN_{46}	—	September 5, 2002	Socorro	LINEAR	·	4.4 km	MPC · JPL
201242	2002 RH_{77}	—	September 5, 2002	Socorro	LINEAR	KOR	2.2 km	MPC · JPL
201243	2002 RM_{80}	—	September 5, 2002	Socorro	LINEAR	·	5.8 km	MPC · JPL
201244	2002 RQ_{82}	—	September 5, 2002	Socorro	LINEAR	·	3.8 km	MPC · JPL
201245	2002 RX_{89}	—	September 5, 2002	Socorro	LINEAR	·	4.3 km	MPC · JPL
201246	2002 RG_{91}	—	September 5, 2002	Socorro	LINEAR	HYG	4.8 km	MPC · JPL
201247	2002 RD_{94}	—	September 5, 2002	Socorro	LINEAR	EUP	4.7 km	MPC · JPL
201248	2002 RK_{94}	—	September 5, 2002	Socorro	LINEAR	·	4.8 km	MPC · JPL
201249	2002 RK_{97}	—	September 5, 2002	Socorro	LINEAR	·	6.0 km	MPC · JPL
201250	2002 RT_{103}	—	September 5, 2002	Socorro	LINEAR	·	4.6 km	MPC · JPL
201251	2002 RZ_{112}	—	September 5, 2002	Socorro	LINEAR	·	6.0 km	MPC · JPL
201252	2002 RM_{116}	—	September 7, 2002	Socorro	LINEAR	·	2.2 km	MPC · JPL
201253	2002 RV_{119}	—	September 7, 2002	Campo Imperatore	CINEOS	·	4.6 km	MPC · JPL
201254	2002 RG_{123}	—	September 8, 2002	Haleakala	NEAT	·	3.7 km	MPC · JPL
201255	2002 RA_{124}	—	September 9, 2002	Palomar	NEAT	EOS	2.7 km	MPC · JPL
201256	2002 RL_{132}	—	September 11, 2002	Palomar	NEAT	·	5.1 km	MPC · JPL
201257	2002 RP_{138}	—	September 10, 2002	Palomar	NEAT	NAE	4.9 km	MPC · JPL
201258	2002 RZ_{138}	—	September 10, 2002	Palomar	NEAT	·	3.8 km	MPC · JPL
201259	2002 RO_{141}	—	September 10, 2002	Haleakala	NEAT	EOS	3.7 km	MPC · JPL
201260	2002 RQ_{144}	—	September 11, 2002	Palomar	NEAT	·	3.6 km	MPC · JPL
201261	2002 RA_{151}	—	September 12, 2002	Palomar	NEAT	·	3.2 km	MPC · JPL
201262	2002 RC_{152}	—	September 12, 2002	Palomar	NEAT	·	4.5 km	MPC · JPL
201263	2002 RP_{160}	—	September 12, 2002	Palomar	NEAT	·	3.3 km	MPC · JPL
201264	2002 RP_{161}	—	September 12, 2002	Palomar	NEAT	·	2.9 km	MPC · JPL
201265	2002 RF_{166}	—	September 13, 2002	Palomar	NEAT	·	3.6 km	MPC · JPL
201266	2002 RK_{167}	—	September 13, 2002	Palomar	NEAT	EOS	2.8 km	MPC · JPL
201267	2002 RX_{183}	—	September 11, 2002	Palomar	NEAT	·	6.7 km	MPC · JPL
201268	2002 RQ_{185}	—	September 12, 2002	Palomar	NEAT	·	5.1 km	MPC · JPL
201269	2002 RR_{185}	—	September 12, 2002	Palomar	NEAT	·	4.1 km	MPC · JPL
201270	2002 RE_{190}	—	September 14, 2002	Palomar	NEAT	·	3.5 km	MPC · JPL
201271	2002 RA_{201}	—	September 13, 2002	Socorro	LINEAR	·	4.7 km	MPC · JPL
201272	2002 RK_{201}	—	September 13, 2002	Socorro	LINEAR	·	6.2 km	MPC · JPL
201273	2002 RP_{210}	—	September 15, 2002	Kitt Peak	Spacewatch	·	2.7 km	MPC · JPL
201274	2002 RS_{224}	—	September 13, 2002	Palomar	NEAT	EOS	3.1 km	MPC · JPL
201275	2002 RR_{228}	—	September 14, 2002	Haleakala	NEAT	·	7.1 km	MPC · JPL
201276	2002 RN_{230}	—	September 15, 2002	Palomar	NEAT	·	2.4 km	MPC · JPL
201277	2002 RC_{239}	—	September 14, 2002	Palomar	R. Matson	EOS	5.4 km	MPC · JPL
201278	2002 RM_{243}	—	September 12, 2002	Palomar	NEAT	·	5.5 km	MPC · JPL
201279	2002 RT_{255}	—	September 4, 2002	Palomar	NEAT	·	2.2 km	MPC · JPL
201280	2002 RJ_{264}	—	September 13, 2002	Palomar	NEAT	·	2.8 km	MPC · JPL
201281	2002 RL_{271}	—	September 14, 2002	Palomar	NEAT	KOR	1.7 km	MPC · JPL
201282	2002 RN_{278}	—	September 14, 2002	Palomar	NEAT	·	3.4 km	MPC · JPL
201283	2002 RP_{278}	—	September 14, 2002	Palomar	NEAT	·	3.1 km	MPC · JPL
201284	2002 SM_{4}	—	September 27, 2002	Palomar	NEAT	·	5.5 km	MPC · JPL
201285	2002 SM_{5}	—	September 27, 2002	Palomar	NEAT	THM	2.9 km	MPC · JPL
201286	2002 SD_{6}	—	September 27, 2002	Palomar	NEAT	·	6.0 km	MPC · JPL
201287	2002 SV_{14}	—	September 27, 2002	Palomar	NEAT	·	6.2 km	MPC · JPL
201288	2002 SU_{16}	—	September 27, 2002	Palomar	NEAT	·	2.2 km	MPC · JPL
201289	2002 SY_{23}	—	September 27, 2002	Socorro	LINEAR	·	5.1 km	MPC · JPL
201290	2002 SM_{36}	—	September 29, 2002	Haleakala	NEAT	KOR	2.8 km	MPC · JPL
201291	2002 SO_{41}	—	September 30, 2002	Socorro	LINEAR	·	4.1 km	MPC · JPL
201292	2002 SF_{46}	—	September 29, 2002	Haleakala	NEAT	·	3.8 km	MPC · JPL
201293	2002 SS_{52}	—	September 18, 2002	Palomar	NEAT	·	5.4 km	MPC · JPL
201294	2002 SS_{53}	—	September 20, 2002	Palomar	NEAT	·	6.6 km	MPC · JPL
201295	2002 SA_{57}	—	September 30, 2002	Socorro	LINEAR	·	4.4 km	MPC · JPL
201296	2002 SD_{58}	—	September 30, 2002	Haleakala	NEAT	·	5.9 km	MPC · JPL
201297	2002 SK_{60}	—	September 16, 2002	Palomar	NEAT	EOS	2.6 km	MPC · JPL
201298	2002 SV_{64}	—	September 19, 2002	Palomar	NEAT	·	3.7 km	MPC · JPL
201299	2002 SX_{70}	—	September 16, 2002	Palomar	NEAT	·	2.2 km	MPC · JPL
201300	2002 TL_{6}	—	October 1, 2002	Anderson Mesa	LONEOS	·	5.1 km	MPC · JPL

== 201301–201400 ==
back to top

Designation			Discovery			Properties		Ref
Permanent	Provisional	Named after	Date	Site	Discoverer(s)	Category	Diam.	Ref
201301	2002 TR_{7}	—	October 1, 2002	Haleakala	NEAT	·	4.8 km	MPC · JPL
201302	2002 TD_{12}	—	October 1, 2002	Anderson Mesa	LONEOS	·	4.2 km	MPC · JPL
201303	2002 TJ_{12}	—	October 1, 2002	Anderson Mesa	LONEOS	·	5.1 km	MPC · JPL
201304	2002 TE_{34}	—	October 2, 2002	Socorro	LINEAR	·	4.3 km	MPC · JPL
201305	2002 TY_{41}	—	October 2, 2002	Socorro	LINEAR	·	6.2 km	MPC · JPL
201306	2002 TL_{62}	—	October 3, 2002	Campo Imperatore	CINEOS	·	4.5 km	MPC · JPL
201307	2002 TC_{65}	—	October 2, 2002	Kvistaberg	Uppsala-DLR Asteroid Survey	·	3.6 km	MPC · JPL
201308 Hansgrade	2002 TK_{69}	Hansgrade	October 10, 2002	Trebur	Kretlow, M.	·	5.1 km	MPC · JPL
201309	2002 TH_{70}	—	October 2, 2002	Campo Imperatore	CINEOS	EOS	4.0 km	MPC · JPL
201310	2002 TJ_{91}	—	October 3, 2002	Palomar	NEAT	·	5.0 km	MPC · JPL
201311	2002 TY_{91}	—	October 3, 2002	Socorro	LINEAR	·	1.8 km	MPC · JPL
201312	2002 TQ_{92}	—	October 1, 2002	Anderson Mesa	LONEOS	·	3.9 km	MPC · JPL
201313	2002 TR_{95}	—	October 3, 2002	Palomar	NEAT	EOS	3.7 km	MPC · JPL
201314	2002 TQ_{97}	—	October 2, 2002	Campo Imperatore	CINEOS	EOS	4.2 km	MPC · JPL
201315	2002 TO_{98}	—	October 3, 2002	Socorro	LINEAR	EOS	2.9 km	MPC · JPL
201316	2002 TA_{112}	—	October 3, 2002	Socorro	LINEAR	EOS	3.1 km	MPC · JPL
201317	2002 TX_{112}	—	October 3, 2002	Palomar	NEAT	·	5.2 km	MPC · JPL
201318	2002 TA_{117}	—	October 3, 2002	Palomar	NEAT	VER	6.7 km	MPC · JPL
201319	2002 TW_{118}	—	October 3, 2002	Palomar	NEAT	EMA	6.7 km	MPC · JPL
201320	2002 TC_{119}	—	October 3, 2002	Palomar	NEAT	·	7.9 km	MPC · JPL
201321	2002 TY_{122}	—	October 4, 2002	Palomar	NEAT	EOS	3.5 km	MPC · JPL
201322	2002 TO_{124}	—	October 4, 2002	Socorro	LINEAR	AGN	2.4 km	MPC · JPL
201323	2002 TJ_{127}	—	October 4, 2002	Palomar	NEAT	VER	5.2 km	MPC · JPL
201324	2002 TV_{127}	—	October 4, 2002	Palomar	NEAT	·	4.4 km	MPC · JPL
201325	2002 TQ_{135}	—	October 4, 2002	Socorro	LINEAR	·	5.4 km	MPC · JPL
201326	2002 TR_{136}	—	October 4, 2002	Anderson Mesa	LONEOS	EOS	3.1 km	MPC · JPL
201327	2002 TO_{139}	—	October 4, 2002	Anderson Mesa	LONEOS	TEL	2.5 km	MPC · JPL
201328	2002 TO_{144}	—	October 5, 2002	Socorro	LINEAR	·	5.5 km	MPC · JPL
201329	2002 TX_{146}	—	October 4, 2002	Socorro	LINEAR	HYG	3.2 km	MPC · JPL
201330	2002 TM_{158}	—	October 5, 2002	Palomar	NEAT	EOS	3.3 km	MPC · JPL
201331	2002 TV_{159}	—	October 5, 2002	Palomar	NEAT	·	3.7 km	MPC · JPL
201332	2002 TV_{160}	—	October 5, 2002	Palomar	NEAT	TIR	5.2 km	MPC · JPL
201333	2002 TA_{163}	—	October 5, 2002	Palomar	NEAT	T_{j} (2.99)	6.6 km	MPC · JPL
201334	2002 TW_{165}	—	October 3, 2002	Palomar	NEAT	EUN	2.1 km	MPC · JPL
201335	2002 TT_{166}	—	October 3, 2002	Palomar	NEAT	·	7.2 km	MPC · JPL
201336	2002 TU_{166}	—	October 3, 2002	Palomar	NEAT	·	7.0 km	MPC · JPL
201337	2002 TN_{169}	—	October 3, 2002	Palomar	NEAT	·	6.6 km	MPC · JPL
201338	2002 TK_{175}	—	October 4, 2002	Socorro	LINEAR	·	3.8 km	MPC · JPL
201339	2002 TQ_{176}	—	October 5, 2002	Socorro	LINEAR	(8737)	5.2 km	MPC · JPL
201340	2002 TX_{185}	—	October 4, 2002	Socorro	LINEAR	·	4.1 km	MPC · JPL
201341	2002 TH_{188}	—	October 4, 2002	Palomar	NEAT	·	7.1 km	MPC · JPL
201342	2002 TR_{189}	—	October 5, 2002	Socorro	LINEAR	EOS	5.1 km	MPC · JPL
201343	2002 TT_{189}	—	October 5, 2002	Socorro	LINEAR	EOS	3.0 km	MPC · JPL
201344	2002 TL_{192}	—	October 5, 2002	Anderson Mesa	LONEOS	·	4.6 km	MPC · JPL
201345	2002 TJ_{198}	—	October 5, 2002	Anderson Mesa	LONEOS	·	4.4 km	MPC · JPL
201346	2002 TW_{198}	—	October 5, 2002	Anderson Mesa	LONEOS	·	6.9 km	MPC · JPL
201347	2002 TD_{199}	—	October 5, 2002	Socorro	LINEAR	·	5.5 km	MPC · JPL
201348	2002 TU_{204}	—	October 4, 2002	Socorro	LINEAR	·	5.9 km	MPC · JPL
201349	2002 TY_{210}	—	October 7, 2002	Socorro	LINEAR	·	4.4 km	MPC · JPL
201350	2002 TG_{211}	—	October 7, 2002	Socorro	LINEAR	·	5.1 km	MPC · JPL
201351	2002 TA_{213}	—	October 7, 2002	Palomar	NEAT	·	5.0 km	MPC · JPL
201352	2002 TR_{214}	—	October 4, 2002	Socorro	LINEAR	·	5.3 km	MPC · JPL
201353	2002 TB_{216}	—	October 5, 2002	Anderson Mesa	LONEOS	·	5.2 km	MPC · JPL
201354	2002 TV_{222}	—	October 7, 2002	Socorro	LINEAR	·	4.6 km	MPC · JPL
201355	2002 TM_{223}	—	October 7, 2002	Socorro	LINEAR	·	6.1 km	MPC · JPL
201356	2002 TN_{224}	—	October 8, 2002	Anderson Mesa	LONEOS	VER	5.8 km	MPC · JPL
201357	2002 TD_{231}	—	October 8, 2002	Palomar	NEAT	·	4.7 km	MPC · JPL
201358	2002 TW_{237}	—	October 6, 2002	Anderson Mesa	LONEOS	·	6.8 km	MPC · JPL
201359	2002 TT_{240}	—	October 6, 2002	Haleakala	NEAT	·	3.8 km	MPC · JPL
201360	2002 TO_{242}	—	October 9, 2002	Socorro	LINEAR	·	6.9 km	MPC · JPL
201361	2002 TX_{242}	—	October 9, 2002	Socorro	LINEAR	HYG	5.4 km	MPC · JPL
201362	2002 TB_{248}	—	October 7, 2002	Palomar	NEAT	·	3.8 km	MPC · JPL
201363	2002 TG_{252}	—	October 8, 2002	Anderson Mesa	LONEOS	·	3.7 km	MPC · JPL
201364	2002 TU_{252}	—	October 8, 2002	Anderson Mesa	LONEOS	CYB	6.4 km	MPC · JPL
201365	2002 TA_{265}	—	October 10, 2002	Kitt Peak	Spacewatch	HYG	3.3 km	MPC · JPL
201366	2002 TX_{266}	—	October 10, 2002	Socorro	LINEAR	·	6.0 km	MPC · JPL
201367	2002 TY_{267}	—	October 9, 2002	Socorro	LINEAR	·	4.9 km	MPC · JPL
201368	2002 TS_{270}	—	October 9, 2002	Socorro	LINEAR	EOS	3.9 km	MPC · JPL
201369	2002 TA_{278}	—	October 10, 2002	Socorro	LINEAR	EOS	4.3 km	MPC · JPL
201370	2002 TY_{290}	—	October 10, 2002	Socorro	LINEAR	·	6.9 km	MPC · JPL
201371	2002 TP_{321}	—	October 5, 2002	Apache Point	SDSS	·	2.5 km	MPC · JPL
201372 Sheldon	2002 TY_{349}	Sheldon	October 10, 2002	Apache Point	SDSS	·	3.0 km	MPC · JPL
201373	2002 TU_{375}	—	October 4, 2002	Palomar	NEAT	·	4.3 km	MPC · JPL
201374	2002 TM_{381}	—	October 9, 2002	Palomar	NEAT	KOR	1.6 km	MPC · JPL
201375	2002 UE_{5}	—	October 28, 2002	Palomar	NEAT	·	3.8 km	MPC · JPL
201376	2002 UN_{5}	—	October 28, 2002	Palomar	NEAT	·	3.8 km	MPC · JPL
201377	2002 UN_{15}	—	October 30, 2002	Palomar	NEAT	·	7.3 km	MPC · JPL
201378	2002 UO_{15}	—	October 30, 2002	Socorro	LINEAR	TIR · fast	4.8 km	MPC · JPL
201379	2002 UY_{28}	—	October 31, 2002	Socorro	LINEAR	·	7.2 km	MPC · JPL
201380	2002 UE_{34}	—	October 30, 2002	Socorro	LINEAR	TIR	4.5 km	MPC · JPL
201381	2002 UJ_{39}	—	October 31, 2002	Palomar	NEAT	·	5.3 km	MPC · JPL
201382	2002 UA_{49}	—	October 31, 2002	Socorro	LINEAR	TIR	4.0 km	MPC · JPL
201383	2002 UT_{61}	—	October 30, 2002	Apache Point	SDSS	·	5.5 km	MPC · JPL
201384	2002 UT_{71}	—	October 31, 2002	Palomar	NEAT	·	4.5 km	MPC · JPL
201385	2002 VB_{6}	—	November 2, 2002	Haleakala	NEAT	·	3.0 km	MPC · JPL
201386	2002 VN_{9}	—	November 1, 2002	Palomar	NEAT	·	6.2 km	MPC · JPL
201387	2002 VV_{14}	—	November 6, 2002	Needville	Needville	·	5.6 km	MPC · JPL
201388	2002 VW_{16}	—	November 5, 2002	Socorro	LINEAR	·	6.4 km	MPC · JPL
201389	2002 VB_{19}	—	November 4, 2002	Palomar	NEAT	THM	5.1 km	MPC · JPL
201390	2002 VD_{21}	—	November 5, 2002	Socorro	LINEAR	·	4.6 km	MPC · JPL
201391	2002 VY_{24}	—	November 5, 2002	Socorro	LINEAR	EOS	3.2 km	MPC · JPL
201392	2002 VC_{41}	—	November 2, 2002	Haleakala	NEAT	EOS	3.5 km	MPC · JPL
201393	2002 VN_{41}	—	November 5, 2002	Palomar	NEAT	·	6.8 km	MPC · JPL
201394	2002 VG_{52}	—	November 6, 2002	Anderson Mesa	LONEOS	·	5.7 km	MPC · JPL
201395	2002 VS_{53}	—	November 6, 2002	Socorro	LINEAR	·	5.2 km	MPC · JPL
201396	2002 VN_{61}	—	November 5, 2002	Socorro	LINEAR	·	5.3 km	MPC · JPL
201397	2002 VR_{68}	—	November 7, 2002	Socorro	LINEAR	GEF	2.2 km	MPC · JPL
201398	2002 VH_{71}	—	November 7, 2002	Socorro	LINEAR	·	2.8 km	MPC · JPL
201399	2002 VT_{72}	—	November 7, 2002	Socorro	LINEAR	·	2.7 km	MPC · JPL
201400	2002 VW_{77}	—	November 7, 2002	Socorro	LINEAR	·	3.0 km	MPC · JPL

== 201401–201500 ==
back to top

Designation			Discovery			Properties		Ref
Permanent	Provisional	Named after	Date	Site	Discoverer(s)	Category	Diam.	Ref
201401	2002 VE_{85}	—	November 11, 2002	Kitt Peak	Spacewatch	·	3.9 km	MPC · JPL
201402	2002 VA_{89}	—	November 11, 2002	Anderson Mesa	LONEOS	·	5.0 km	MPC · JPL
201403	2002 VJ_{89}	—	November 11, 2002	Anderson Mesa	LONEOS	·	7.4 km	MPC · JPL
201404	2002 VE_{90}	—	November 11, 2002	Socorro	LINEAR	·	4.8 km	MPC · JPL
201405	2002 VM_{95}	—	November 11, 2002	Socorro	LINEAR	·	4.3 km	MPC · JPL
201406	2002 VZ_{97}	—	November 12, 2002	Socorro	LINEAR	·	3.3 km	MPC · JPL
201407	2002 VK_{118}	—	November 11, 2002	Socorro	LINEAR	·	8.4 km	MPC · JPL
201408	2002 VL_{118}	—	November 11, 2002	Socorro	LINEAR	(6355)	7.1 km	MPC · JPL
201409	2002 VF_{141}	—	November 13, 2002	Palomar	NEAT	TEL	2.1 km	MPC · JPL
201410	2002 WB	—	November 16, 2002	Anderson Mesa	LONEOS	·	4.8 km	MPC · JPL
201411	2002 WY_{3}	—	November 24, 2002	Palomar	NEAT	·	4.4 km	MPC · JPL
201412	2002 WF_{6}	—	November 24, 2002	Palomar	NEAT	·	4.2 km	MPC · JPL
201413	2002 WC_{14}	—	November 28, 2002	Anderson Mesa	LONEOS	EOS	3.6 km	MPC · JPL
201414	2002 XT	—	December 1, 2002	Socorro	LINEAR	·	3.7 km	MPC · JPL
201415	2002 XH_{13}	—	December 3, 2002	Haleakala	NEAT	THM	4.9 km	MPC · JPL
201416	2002 XV_{15}	—	December 3, 2002	Palomar	NEAT	·	6.6 km	MPC · JPL
201417	2002 XD_{32}	—	December 6, 2002	Socorro	LINEAR	·	7.9 km	MPC · JPL
201418	2002 XR_{33}	—	December 5, 2002	Socorro	LINEAR	·	4.2 km	MPC · JPL
201419	2002 XE_{42}	—	December 6, 2002	Socorro	LINEAR	TIR	5.8 km	MPC · JPL
201420	2002 XG_{56}	—	December 9, 2002	Anderson Mesa	LONEOS	EOS	3.6 km	MPC · JPL
201421	2002 XA_{58}	—	December 11, 2002	Socorro	LINEAR	·	6.4 km	MPC · JPL
201422	2002 XE_{90}	—	December 14, 2002	Socorro	LINEAR	·	5.4 km	MPC · JPL
201423	2002 XF_{116}	—	December 7, 2002	Apache Point	SDSS	·	2.1 km	MPC · JPL
201424	2002 YQ_{7}	—	December 30, 2002	Bohyunsan	Jeon, Y.-B., Lee, B.-C.	·	1.2 km	MPC · JPL
201425	2002 YP_{14}	—	December 31, 2002	Socorro	LINEAR	·	1.3 km	MPC · JPL
201426	2003 AG_{14}	—	January 2, 2003	Socorro	LINEAR	·	6.7 km	MPC · JPL
201427	2003 AM_{28}	—	January 4, 2003	Socorro	LINEAR	·	1.0 km	MPC · JPL
201428	2003 AQ_{56}	—	January 5, 2003	Socorro	LINEAR	·	1.1 km	MPC · JPL
201429	2003 AH_{66}	—	January 7, 2003	Socorro	LINEAR	·	5.4 km	MPC · JPL
201430	2003 AK_{66}	—	January 7, 2003	Socorro	LINEAR	·	6.9 km	MPC · JPL
201431	2003 BZ_{34}	—	January 27, 2003	Socorro	LINEAR	·	1.2 km	MPC · JPL
201432	2003 BS_{43}	—	January 27, 2003	Socorro	LINEAR	·	790 m	MPC · JPL
201433	2003 BB_{52}	—	January 27, 2003	Socorro	LINEAR	·	1.1 km	MPC · JPL
201434	2003 BD_{56}	—	January 28, 2003	Haleakala	NEAT	·	1.2 km	MPC · JPL
201435	2003 BQ_{89}	—	January 28, 2003	Kitt Peak	Spacewatch	·	860 m	MPC · JPL
201436	2003 DX_{1}	—	February 21, 2003	Palomar	NEAT	NYS	1.7 km	MPC · JPL
201437	2003 DN_{19}	—	February 22, 2003	Palomar	NEAT	·	1.1 km	MPC · JPL
201438	2003 EQ_{20}	—	March 6, 2003	Anderson Mesa	LONEOS	·	1.3 km	MPC · JPL
201439	2003 EU_{23}	—	March 6, 2003	Socorro	LINEAR	·	1.5 km	MPC · JPL
201440	2003 EU_{26}	—	March 6, 2003	Anderson Mesa	LONEOS	·	1.5 km	MPC · JPL
201441	2003 EE_{27}	—	March 6, 2003	Anderson Mesa	LONEOS	·	1.9 km	MPC · JPL
201442	2003 EQ_{34}	—	March 7, 2003	Socorro	LINEAR	·	1.5 km	MPC · JPL
201443	2003 EO_{35}	—	March 7, 2003	Socorro	LINEAR	·	1.6 km	MPC · JPL
201444	2003 EZ_{44}	—	March 7, 2003	Socorro	LINEAR	·	870 m	MPC · JPL
201445	2003 FH_{15}	—	March 23, 2003	Catalina	CSS	·	1.1 km	MPC · JPL
201446	2003 FM_{48}	—	March 24, 2003	Kitt Peak	Spacewatch	·	930 m	MPC · JPL
201447	2003 FQ_{50}	—	March 25, 2003	Palomar	NEAT	·	1.0 km	MPC · JPL
201448	2003 FE_{53}	—	March 25, 2003	Haleakala	NEAT	·	1.1 km	MPC · JPL
201449	2003 FY_{58}	—	March 26, 2003	Palomar	NEAT	ERI	2.3 km	MPC · JPL
201450	2003 FT_{63}	—	March 26, 2003	Palomar	NEAT	·	1.0 km	MPC · JPL
201451	2003 FU_{65}	—	March 26, 2003	Palomar	NEAT	·	1.1 km	MPC · JPL
201452	2003 FJ_{68}	—	March 26, 2003	Palomar	NEAT	·	1.4 km	MPC · JPL
201453	2003 FV_{73}	—	March 26, 2003	Haleakala	NEAT	·	2.4 km	MPC · JPL
201454	2003 FM_{74}	—	March 26, 2003	Haleakala	NEAT	·	1.8 km	MPC · JPL
201455	2003 FU_{78}	—	March 27, 2003	Kitt Peak	Spacewatch	ERI	3.0 km	MPC · JPL
201456	2003 FX_{79}	—	March 27, 2003	Palomar	NEAT	·	1.6 km	MPC · JPL
201457	2003 FC_{92}	—	March 29, 2003	Anderson Mesa	LONEOS	·	1.1 km	MPC · JPL
201458	2003 FV_{96}	—	March 30, 2003	Kitt Peak	Spacewatch	·	720 m	MPC · JPL
201459	2003 FG_{97}	—	March 30, 2003	Kitt Peak	Spacewatch	·	2.0 km	MPC · JPL
201460	2003 FJ_{99}	—	March 30, 2003	Socorro	LINEAR	·	2.6 km	MPC · JPL
201461	2003 FD_{101}	—	March 31, 2003	Anderson Mesa	LONEOS	·	1.5 km	MPC · JPL
201462	2003 FZ_{103}	—	March 24, 2003	Kitt Peak	Spacewatch	V	1.1 km	MPC · JPL
201463	2003 FC_{108}	—	March 31, 2003	Kitt Peak	Spacewatch	·	1.6 km	MPC · JPL
201464	2003 FV_{108}	—	March 31, 2003	Socorro	LINEAR	·	1.1 km	MPC · JPL
201465	2003 FB_{119}	—	March 26, 2003	Anderson Mesa	LONEOS	·	1.0 km	MPC · JPL
201466	2003 FG_{120}	—	March 23, 2003	Kitt Peak	Spacewatch	·	2.1 km	MPC · JPL
201467	2003 FQ_{121}	—	March 25, 2003	Anderson Mesa	LONEOS	·	1.8 km	MPC · JPL
201468	2003 FL_{130}	—	March 24, 2003	Kitt Peak	Spacewatch	·	1.6 km	MPC · JPL
201469	2003 GQ_{1}	—	April 1, 2003	Socorro	LINEAR	NYS	1.7 km	MPC · JPL
201470	2003 GP_{17}	—	April 3, 2003	Anderson Mesa	LONEOS	·	1.6 km	MPC · JPL
201471	2003 GV_{18}	—	April 4, 2003	Kitt Peak	Spacewatch	NYS	1.1 km	MPC · JPL
201472	2003 GZ_{19}	—	April 5, 2003	Kitt Peak	Spacewatch	NYS	1.8 km	MPC · JPL
201473	2003 GV_{22}	—	April 3, 2003	Anderson Mesa	LONEOS	NYS	1.6 km	MPC · JPL
201474	2003 GN_{27}	—	April 7, 2003	Kitt Peak	Spacewatch	·	1.5 km	MPC · JPL
201475	2003 GV_{28}	—	April 4, 2003	Anderson Mesa	LONEOS	·	1.1 km	MPC · JPL
201476	2003 GS_{34}	—	April 7, 2003	Kitt Peak	Spacewatch	·	1.2 km	MPC · JPL
201477	2003 GN_{37}	—	April 7, 2003	Socorro	LINEAR	NYS ·	2.9 km	MPC · JPL
201478	2003 GT_{37}	—	April 7, 2003	Palomar	NEAT	·	1.1 km	MPC · JPL
201479	2003 GX_{49}	—	April 10, 2003	Kitt Peak	Spacewatch	·	2.0 km	MPC · JPL
201480	2003 GF_{54}	—	April 4, 2003	Kitt Peak	Spacewatch	V	1.2 km	MPC · JPL
201481	2003 HG_{1}	—	April 21, 2003	Catalina	CSS	NYS	2.1 km	MPC · JPL
201482	2003 HU_{4}	—	April 24, 2003	Kitt Peak	Spacewatch	·	1.8 km	MPC · JPL
201483	2003 HT_{7}	—	April 24, 2003	Anderson Mesa	LONEOS	MAS	1.0 km	MPC · JPL
201484	2003 HC_{13}	—	April 24, 2003	Anderson Mesa	LONEOS	V	1.1 km	MPC · JPL
201485	2003 HE_{20}	—	April 26, 2003	Haleakala	NEAT	·	1.7 km	MPC · JPL
201486	2003 HX_{21}	—	April 27, 2003	Anderson Mesa	LONEOS	NYS ·	2.4 km	MPC · JPL
201487	2003 HA_{36}	—	April 27, 2003	Anderson Mesa	LONEOS	·	2.2 km	MPC · JPL
201488	2003 HJ_{39}	—	April 29, 2003	Socorro	LINEAR	·	1.2 km	MPC · JPL
201489	2003 HT_{39}	—	April 29, 2003	Socorro	LINEAR	fast	1.4 km	MPC · JPL
201490	2003 HX_{51}	—	April 30, 2003	Haleakala	NEAT	·	2.8 km	MPC · JPL
201491	2003 HG_{53}	—	April 30, 2003	Reedy Creek	J. Broughton	·	1.4 km	MPC · JPL
201492	2003 HZ_{53}	—	April 24, 2003	Kitt Peak	Spacewatch	NYS	1.8 km	MPC · JPL
201493	2003 JL_{1}	—	May 1, 2003	Socorro	LINEAR	NYS	2.0 km	MPC · JPL
201494	2003 JM_{1}	—	May 1, 2003	Socorro	LINEAR	NYS	1.8 km	MPC · JPL
201495	2003 JO_{3}	—	May 2, 2003	Kitt Peak	Spacewatch	·	4.0 km	MPC · JPL
201496	2003 JS_{4}	—	May 1, 2003	Kitt Peak	Spacewatch	NYS	1.6 km	MPC · JPL
201497 Marcelroche	2003 JT_{17}	Marcelroche	May 2, 2003	Mérida	Ferrin, I. R., Leal, C.	·	4.5 km	MPC · JPL
201498	2003 KN_{9}	—	May 25, 2003	Reedy Creek	J. Broughton	·	2.3 km	MPC · JPL
201499	2003 KV_{18}	—	May 26, 2003	Reedy Creek	J. Broughton	·	1.7 km	MPC · JPL
201500	2003 LV_{2}	—	June 2, 2003	Siding Spring	R. H. McNaught	·	3.3 km	MPC · JPL

== 201501–201600 ==
back to top

Designation			Discovery			Properties		Ref
Permanent	Provisional	Named after	Date	Site	Discoverer(s)	Category	Diam.	Ref
201501	2003 LV_{4}	—	June 5, 2003	Kitt Peak	Spacewatch	·	3.3 km	MPC · JPL
201502	2003 MK_{3}	—	June 25, 2003	Socorro	LINEAR	·	2.7 km	MPC · JPL
201503	2003 MR_{5}	—	June 26, 2003	Socorro	LINEAR	·	5.9 km	MPC · JPL
201504	2003 MW_{9}	—	June 28, 2003	Reedy Creek	J. Broughton	·	2.3 km	MPC · JPL
201505	2003 MD_{13}	—	June 26, 2003	Socorro	LINEAR	·	4.0 km	MPC · JPL
201506	2003 NQ	—	July 1, 2003	Haleakala	NEAT	·	1.7 km	MPC · JPL
201507	2003 NC_{8}	—	July 8, 2003	Palomar	NEAT	·	3.6 km	MPC · JPL
201508	2003 OD_{1}	—	July 22, 2003	Socorro	LINEAR	·	7.5 km	MPC · JPL
201509	2003 OP_{5}	—	July 23, 2003	Haleakala	NEAT	EUN	2.3 km	MPC · JPL
201510	2003 OT_{5}	—	July 24, 2003	Reedy Creek	J. Broughton	·	5.0 km	MPC · JPL
201511 Ferreret	2003 OY_{5}	Ferreret	July 24, 2003	Costitx	OAM	·	2.0 km	MPC · JPL
201512	2003 OF_{9}	—	July 23, 2003	Palomar	NEAT	MAR	1.3 km	MPC · JPL
201513	2003 OU_{15}	—	July 23, 2003	Palomar	NEAT	·	3.2 km	MPC · JPL
201514	2003 OV_{19}	—	July 31, 2003	Haleakala	NEAT	EUN	2.3 km	MPC · JPL
201515	2003 OS_{21}	—	July 28, 2003	Campo Imperatore	CINEOS	(5)	2.4 km	MPC · JPL
201516	2003 OE_{29}	—	July 24, 2003	Palomar	NEAT	·	4.1 km	MPC · JPL
201517	2003 OF_{29}	—	July 24, 2003	Palomar	NEAT	·	1.7 km	MPC · JPL
201518	2003 OH_{29}	—	July 24, 2003	Palomar	NEAT	·	1.9 km	MPC · JPL
201519	2003 OV_{31}	—	July 24, 2003	Campo Imperatore	CINEOS	V	1.1 km	MPC · JPL
201520	2003 PD_{4}	—	August 2, 2003	Haleakala	NEAT	·	1.9 km	MPC · JPL
201521	2003 QX_{1}	—	August 19, 2003	Campo Imperatore	CINEOS	KOR	2.5 km	MPC · JPL
201522	2003 QC_{2}	—	August 19, 2003	Campo Imperatore	CINEOS	·	1.7 km	MPC · JPL
201523	2003 QX_{8}	—	August 20, 2003	Campo Imperatore	CINEOS	MRX	1.5 km	MPC · JPL
201524	2003 QX_{11}	—	August 21, 2003	Palomar	NEAT	·	2.4 km	MPC · JPL
201525	2003 QY_{12}	—	August 22, 2003	Haleakala	NEAT	·	2.1 km	MPC · JPL
201526	2003 QZ_{17}	—	August 22, 2003	Palomar	NEAT	·	3.6 km	MPC · JPL
201527	2003 QT_{18}	—	August 22, 2003	Palomar	NEAT	·	3.2 km	MPC · JPL
201528	2003 QL_{20}	—	August 22, 2003	Palomar	NEAT	·	3.0 km	MPC · JPL
201529	2003 QS_{24}	—	August 22, 2003	Campo Imperatore	CINEOS	·	2.8 km	MPC · JPL
201530	2003 QL_{25}	—	August 22, 2003	Palomar	NEAT	·	1.6 km	MPC · JPL
201531	2003 QE_{39}	—	August 22, 2003	Palomar	NEAT	·	4.6 km	MPC · JPL
201532	2003 QM_{49}	—	August 22, 2003	Palomar	NEAT	·	1.7 km	MPC · JPL
201533	2003 QY_{50}	—	August 22, 2003	Palomar	NEAT	·	3.3 km	MPC · JPL
201534	2003 QV_{61}	—	August 23, 2003	Socorro	LINEAR	GEF	2.2 km	MPC · JPL
201535	2003 QV_{62}	—	August 23, 2003	Socorro	LINEAR	·	2.7 km	MPC · JPL
201536	2003 QG_{67}	—	August 23, 2003	Socorro	LINEAR	·	3.4 km	MPC · JPL
201537	2003 QA_{71}	—	August 23, 2003	Palomar	NEAT	PAD	3.8 km	MPC · JPL
201538	2003 QC_{73}	—	August 24, 2003	Socorro	LINEAR	·	3.7 km	MPC · JPL
201539	2003 QA_{75}	—	August 24, 2003	Socorro	LINEAR	NEM	3.2 km	MPC · JPL
201540	2003 QE_{76}	—	August 24, 2003	Socorro	LINEAR	·	1.8 km	MPC · JPL
201541	2003 QH_{95}	—	August 29, 2003	Haleakala	NEAT	·	3.6 km	MPC · JPL
201542	2003 QF_{96}	—	August 30, 2003	Haleakala	NEAT	·	4.9 km	MPC · JPL
201543	2003 QU_{100}	—	August 28, 2003	Haleakala	NEAT	·	2.4 km	MPC · JPL
201544	2003 QY_{100}	—	August 28, 2003	Haleakala	NEAT	WIT	1.5 km	MPC · JPL
201545	2003 QF_{103}	—	August 31, 2003	Socorro	LINEAR	·	4.0 km	MPC · JPL
201546	2003 QT_{103}	—	August 31, 2003	Haleakala	NEAT	·	2.8 km	MPC · JPL
201547	2003 QN_{106}	—	August 31, 2003	Kitt Peak	Spacewatch	·	1.9 km	MPC · JPL
201548	2003 QQ_{110}	—	August 31, 2003	Socorro	LINEAR	·	2.1 km	MPC · JPL
201549	2003 RN	—	September 1, 2003	Kvistaberg	Uppsala-DLR Asteroid Survey	(194)	3.5 km	MPC · JPL
201550	2003 RC_{15}	—	September 15, 2003	Palomar	NEAT	(5)	1.7 km	MPC · JPL
201551	2003 RH_{15}	—	September 15, 2003	Haleakala	NEAT	·	7.0 km	MPC · JPL
201552	2003 RQ_{16}	—	September 15, 2003	Palomar	NEAT	·	3.5 km	MPC · JPL
201553	2003 RD_{17}	—	September 15, 2003	Palomar	NEAT	·	2.4 km	MPC · JPL
201554	2003 RG_{17}	—	September 15, 2003	Palomar	NEAT	·	3.1 km	MPC · JPL
201555	2003 RY_{18}	—	September 15, 2003	Anderson Mesa	LONEOS	·	3.2 km	MPC · JPL
201556	2003 RZ_{18}	—	September 15, 2003	Anderson Mesa	LONEOS	(21344)	3.1 km	MPC · JPL
201557	2003 RC_{26}	—	September 3, 2003	Bergisch Gladbach	W. Bickel	·	4.1 km	MPC · JPL
201558	2003 RC_{27}	—	September 1, 2003	Socorro	LINEAR	·	2.9 km	MPC · JPL
201559	2003 SS_{2}	—	September 16, 2003	Kitt Peak	Spacewatch	·	2.5 km	MPC · JPL
201560	2003 SB_{8}	—	September 16, 2003	Kitt Peak	Spacewatch	·	2.6 km	MPC · JPL
201561	2003 SX_{10}	—	September 17, 2003	Kitt Peak	Spacewatch	NEM	2.7 km	MPC · JPL
201562	2003 SF_{13}	—	September 16, 2003	Kitt Peak	Spacewatch	·	2.1 km	MPC · JPL
201563	2003 SK_{16}	—	September 17, 2003	Socorro	LINEAR	·	3.1 km	MPC · JPL
201564	2003 SW_{16}	—	September 17, 2003	Kitt Peak	Spacewatch	NEM	4.2 km	MPC · JPL
201565	2003 SQ_{28}	—	September 18, 2003	Palomar	NEAT	·	3.6 km	MPC · JPL
201566	2003 SM_{29}	—	September 18, 2003	Palomar	NEAT	·	3.1 km	MPC · JPL
201567	2003 SN_{29}	—	September 18, 2003	Palomar	NEAT	·	3.6 km	MPC · JPL
201568	2003 SQ_{38}	—	September 16, 2003	Palomar	NEAT	CLO	3.7 km	MPC · JPL
201569	2003 SM_{47}	—	September 17, 2003	Kvistaberg	Uppsala-DLR Asteroid Survey	·	3.2 km	MPC · JPL
201570	2003 SD_{49}	—	September 18, 2003	Palomar	NEAT	·	2.8 km	MPC · JPL
201571	2003 SP_{50}	—	September 18, 2003	Palomar	NEAT	WIT	1.2 km	MPC · JPL
201572	2003 SE_{52}	—	September 18, 2003	Palomar	NEAT	·	2.1 km	MPC · JPL
201573	2003 SK_{59}	—	September 17, 2003	Anderson Mesa	LONEOS	·	3.1 km	MPC · JPL
201574	2003 SQ_{61}	—	September 17, 2003	Socorro	LINEAR	·	2.3 km	MPC · JPL
201575	2003 SX_{65}	—	September 18, 2003	Socorro	LINEAR	·	3.1 km	MPC · JPL
201576	2003 SX_{69}	—	September 17, 2003	Kitt Peak	Spacewatch	·	2.8 km	MPC · JPL
201577	2003 SR_{70}	—	September 18, 2003	Uccle	T. Pauwels	·	3.2 km	MPC · JPL
201578	2003 ST_{71}	—	September 18, 2003	Kitt Peak	Spacewatch	DOR	4.6 km	MPC · JPL
201579	2003 SA_{80}	—	September 19, 2003	Kitt Peak	Spacewatch	·	1.5 km	MPC · JPL
201580	2003 SC_{80}	—	September 19, 2003	Kitt Peak	Spacewatch	NEM	3.0 km	MPC · JPL
201581	2003 SS_{80}	—	September 19, 2003	Haleakala	NEAT	·	3.3 km	MPC · JPL
201582	2003 SX_{85}	—	September 16, 2003	Kitt Peak	Spacewatch	·	5.0 km	MPC · JPL
201583	2003 SJ_{87}	—	September 17, 2003	Socorro	LINEAR	·	3.3 km	MPC · JPL
201584	2003 SX_{87}	—	September 17, 2003	Campo Imperatore	CINEOS	·	3.6 km	MPC · JPL
201585	2003 SK_{90}	—	September 18, 2003	Socorro	LINEAR	·	4.7 km	MPC · JPL
201586	2003 SF_{97}	—	September 19, 2003	Palomar	NEAT	·	3.6 km	MPC · JPL
201587	2003 SU_{104}	—	September 20, 2003	Socorro	LINEAR	HOF	4.1 km	MPC · JPL
201588	2003 SS_{119}	—	September 17, 2003	Kitt Peak	Spacewatch	·	3.7 km	MPC · JPL
201589	2003 SU_{120}	—	September 17, 2003	Socorro	LINEAR	·	3.2 km	MPC · JPL
201590	2003 SZ_{127}	—	September 20, 2003	Socorro	LINEAR	EOS	2.8 km	MPC · JPL
201591	2003 SU_{128}	—	September 20, 2003	Kitt Peak	Spacewatch	·	2.8 km	MPC · JPL
201592	2003 SE_{129}	—	September 20, 2003	Črni Vrh	Skvarč, J.	·	2.9 km	MPC · JPL
201593	2003 SX_{139}	—	September 18, 2003	Kitt Peak	Spacewatch	·	2.7 km	MPC · JPL
201594	2003 SZ_{143}	—	September 21, 2003	Socorro	LINEAR	HOF	4.1 km	MPC · JPL
201595	2003 SC_{146}	—	September 20, 2003	Haleakala	NEAT	·	3.4 km	MPC · JPL
201596	2003 ST_{148}	—	September 16, 2003	Kitt Peak	Spacewatch	·	2.5 km	MPC · JPL
201597	2003 SV_{151}	—	September 18, 2003	Palomar	NEAT	·	1.9 km	MPC · JPL
201598	2003 SA_{155}	—	September 19, 2003	Anderson Mesa	LONEOS	PAD	3.4 km	MPC · JPL
201599	2003 SH_{164}	—	September 20, 2003	Anderson Mesa	LONEOS	·	2.8 km	MPC · JPL
201600	2003 SR_{174}	—	September 18, 2003	Kitt Peak	Spacewatch	·	2.3 km	MPC · JPL

== 201601–201700 ==
back to top

Designation			Discovery			Properties		Ref
Permanent	Provisional	Named after	Date	Site	Discoverer(s)	Category	Diam.	Ref
201601	2003 SU_{174}	—	September 18, 2003	Kitt Peak	Spacewatch	·	2.5 km	MPC · JPL
201602	2003 SU_{187}	—	September 22, 2003	Anderson Mesa	LONEOS	·	2.7 km	MPC · JPL
201603	2003 SC_{190}	—	September 24, 2003	Palomar	NEAT	BRA	3.8 km	MPC · JPL
201604	2003 SW_{192}	—	September 20, 2003	Palomar	NEAT	·	3.9 km	MPC · JPL
201605	2003 SZ_{195}	—	September 20, 2003	Palomar	NEAT	·	3.1 km	MPC · JPL
201606	2003 SC_{196}	—	September 20, 2003	Palomar	NEAT	·	2.7 km	MPC · JPL
201607	2003 SG_{196}	—	September 20, 2003	Palomar	NEAT	·	3.3 km	MPC · JPL
201608	2003 SK_{198}	—	September 21, 2003	Anderson Mesa	LONEOS	·	3.0 km	MPC · JPL
201609	2003 SS_{201}	—	September 26, 2003	Desert Eagle	W. K. Y. Yeung	·	3.4 km	MPC · JPL
201610	2003 SA_{202}	—	September 20, 2003	Campo Imperatore	CINEOS	·	2.6 km	MPC · JPL
201611	2003 SP_{203}	—	September 22, 2003	Anderson Mesa	LONEOS	·	2.3 km	MPC · JPL
201612	2003 SB_{205}	—	September 22, 2003	Kitt Peak	Spacewatch	·	3.6 km	MPC · JPL
201613	2003 SQ_{212}	—	September 25, 2003	Haleakala	NEAT	ADE	3.8 km	MPC · JPL
201614	2003 SN_{217}	—	September 27, 2003	Kitt Peak	Spacewatch	·	2.3 km	MPC · JPL
201615	2003 SV_{220}	—	September 29, 2003	Desert Eagle	W. K. Y. Yeung	·	3.2 km	MPC · JPL
201616	2003 ST_{226}	—	September 26, 2003	Socorro	LINEAR	·	2.9 km	MPC · JPL
201617	2003 SB_{233}	—	September 25, 2003	Palomar	NEAT	AGN	4.9 km	MPC · JPL
201618	2003 SN_{233}	—	September 25, 2003	Palomar	NEAT	·	1.8 km	MPC · JPL
201619	2003 SR_{247}	—	September 26, 2003	Socorro	LINEAR	·	3.1 km	MPC · JPL
201620	2003 SQ_{248}	—	September 26, 2003	Socorro	LINEAR	·	3.3 km	MPC · JPL
201621	2003 SJ_{252}	—	September 26, 2003	Socorro	LINEAR	·	6.7 km	MPC · JPL
201622	2003 SW_{252}	—	September 27, 2003	Socorro	LINEAR	·	3.1 km	MPC · JPL
201623	2003 SE_{253}	—	September 27, 2003	Kitt Peak	Spacewatch	·	1.8 km	MPC · JPL
201624	2003 SQ_{253}	—	September 27, 2003	Socorro	LINEAR	AEO	1.8 km	MPC · JPL
201625	2003 SV_{258}	—	September 28, 2003	Kitt Peak	Spacewatch	HOF	3.4 km	MPC · JPL
201626	2003 SB_{259}	—	September 28, 2003	Kitt Peak	Spacewatch	AGN	2.0 km	MPC · JPL
201627	2003 SA_{260}	—	September 28, 2003	Kitt Peak	Spacewatch	·	2.4 km	MPC · JPL
201628	2003 SO_{262}	—	September 28, 2003	Socorro	LINEAR	·	2.7 km	MPC · JPL
201629	2003 SQ_{262}	—	September 28, 2003	Socorro	LINEAR	AGN	1.6 km	MPC · JPL
201630	2003 SU_{266}	—	September 29, 2003	Socorro	LINEAR	HOF	4.2 km	MPC · JPL
201631	2003 SG_{271}	—	September 25, 2003	Haleakala	NEAT	·	3.7 km	MPC · JPL
201632	2003 SS_{277}	—	September 30, 2003	Socorro	LINEAR	·	3.4 km	MPC · JPL
201633	2003 SY_{279}	—	September 18, 2003	Kitt Peak	Spacewatch	MRX	1.4 km	MPC · JPL
201634	2003 SQ_{284}	—	September 20, 2003	Socorro	LINEAR	·	2.6 km	MPC · JPL
201635	2003 SE_{286}	—	September 20, 2003	Palomar	NEAT	·	3.3 km	MPC · JPL
201636	2003 SJ_{297}	—	September 18, 2003	Haleakala	NEAT	NEM	3.8 km	MPC · JPL
201637	2003 SB_{299}	—	September 29, 2003	Anderson Mesa	LONEOS	·	7.0 km	MPC · JPL
201638	2003 SO_{311}	—	September 29, 2003	Socorro	LINEAR	·	2.8 km	MPC · JPL
201639	2003 SX_{318}	—	September 19, 2003	Palomar	NEAT	·	2.3 km	MPC · JPL
201640	2003 SS_{326}	—	September 18, 2003	Palomar	NEAT	·	2.4 km	MPC · JPL
201641	2003 SU_{337}	—	September 18, 2003	Kitt Peak	Spacewatch	·	1.8 km	MPC · JPL
201642	2003 SA_{338}	—	September 22, 2003	Anderson Mesa	LONEOS	·	4.1 km	MPC · JPL
201643	2003 SC_{340}	—	September 28, 2003	Apache Point	SDSS	·	2.1 km	MPC · JPL
201644	2003 SD_{355}	—	September 25, 2003	Palomar	NEAT	·	4.3 km	MPC · JPL
201645	2003 SM_{362}	—	September 22, 2003	Kitt Peak	Spacewatch	EOS	5.4 km	MPC · JPL
201646	2003 SJ_{376}	—	September 26, 2003	Apache Point	SDSS	AST	2.3 km	MPC · JPL
201647	2003 SS_{429}	—	September 28, 2003	Kitt Peak	Spacewatch	KOR	1.4 km	MPC · JPL
201648	2003 SF_{430}	—	September 30, 2003	Kitt Peak	Spacewatch	·	2.9 km	MPC · JPL
201649	2003 TX_{1}	—	October 5, 2003	Kitt Peak	Spacewatch	EOS	2.2 km	MPC · JPL
201650	2003 TS_{3}	—	October 1, 2003	Kitt Peak	Spacewatch	·	3.7 km	MPC · JPL
201651	2003 TA_{7}	—	October 1, 2003	Anderson Mesa	LONEOS	·	2.8 km	MPC · JPL
201652	2003 TE_{8}	—	October 1, 2003	Kitt Peak	Spacewatch	fast	3.2 km	MPC · JPL
201653	2003 TZ_{8}	—	October 3, 2003	Haleakala	NEAT	·	3.2 km	MPC · JPL
201654	2003 TU_{10}	—	October 14, 2003	Palomar	NEAT	·	4.3 km	MPC · JPL
201655	2003 TY_{10}	—	October 15, 2003	Palomar	NEAT	·	3.3 km	MPC · JPL
201656	2003 TR_{14}	—	October 14, 2003	Anderson Mesa	LONEOS	(18466)	3.9 km	MPC · JPL
201657	2003 TV_{15}	—	October 15, 2003	Anderson Mesa	LONEOS	·	7.2 km	MPC · JPL
201658	2003 TN_{20}	—	October 14, 2003	Palomar	NEAT	JUN	6.6 km	MPC · JPL
201659	2003 TO_{28}	—	October 1, 2003	Kitt Peak	Spacewatch	KOR	1.7 km	MPC · JPL
201660	2003 TW_{45}	—	October 3, 2003	Kitt Peak	Spacewatch	GEF	1.6 km	MPC · JPL
201661	2003 UU_{3}	—	October 16, 2003	Kitt Peak	Spacewatch	·	3.4 km	MPC · JPL
201662	2003 UA_{9}	—	October 17, 2003	Socorro	LINEAR	(40134)	3.7 km	MPC · JPL
201663	2003 UB_{12}	—	October 19, 2003	Kitt Peak	Spacewatch	THM	3.7 km	MPC · JPL
201664	2003 UW_{13}	—	October 16, 2003	Palomar	NEAT	(5)	1.7 km	MPC · JPL
201665	2003 UK_{23}	—	October 22, 2003	Kitt Peak	Spacewatch	·	2.8 km	MPC · JPL
201666	2003 UN_{50}	—	October 17, 2003	Kitt Peak	Spacewatch	·	2.5 km	MPC · JPL
201667	2003 UX_{51}	—	October 18, 2003	Palomar	NEAT	·	3.7 km	MPC · JPL
201668	2003 UG_{57}	—	October 26, 2003	Kvistaberg	Uppsala-DLR Asteroid Survey	NEM	5.3 km	MPC · JPL
201669	2003 UK_{58}	—	October 16, 2003	Kitt Peak	Spacewatch	·	4.0 km	MPC · JPL
201670	2003 UT_{60}	—	October 16, 2003	Palomar	NEAT	·	5.8 km	MPC · JPL
201671	2003 UZ_{70}	—	October 18, 2003	Kitt Peak	Spacewatch	EOS	2.4 km	MPC · JPL
201672	2003 UK_{73}	—	October 19, 2003	Kitt Peak	Spacewatch	AST	2.7 km	MPC · JPL
201673	2003 UK_{77}	—	October 17, 2003	Anderson Mesa	LONEOS	·	3.7 km	MPC · JPL
201674	2003 UH_{80}	—	October 16, 2003	Palomar	NEAT	·	2.5 km	MPC · JPL
201675	2003 UV_{81}	—	October 18, 2003	Kitt Peak	Spacewatch	·	2.9 km	MPC · JPL
201676	2003 UC_{85}	—	October 18, 2003	Haleakala	NEAT	NEM	3.3 km	MPC · JPL
201677	2003 UY_{86}	—	October 18, 2003	Palomar	NEAT	EOS	3.3 km	MPC · JPL
201678	2003 UH_{88}	—	October 19, 2003	Kitt Peak	Spacewatch	AGN	2.1 km	MPC · JPL
201679	2003 UT_{88}	—	October 19, 2003	Anderson Mesa	LONEOS	·	3.7 km	MPC · JPL
201680	2003 UJ_{92}	—	October 20, 2003	Palomar	NEAT	·	3.4 km	MPC · JPL
201681	2003 UB_{94}	—	October 18, 2003	Kitt Peak	Spacewatch	·	3.8 km	MPC · JPL
201682	2003 UB_{96}	—	October 18, 2003	Kitt Peak	Spacewatch	WIT	1.6 km	MPC · JPL
201683	2003 UA_{99}	—	October 19, 2003	Kitt Peak	Spacewatch	HYG	4.4 km	MPC · JPL
201684	2003 UC_{104}	—	October 17, 2003	Anderson Mesa	LONEOS	·	2.9 km	MPC · JPL
201685	2003 UN_{107}	—	October 19, 2003	Socorro	LINEAR	TIR	4.1 km	MPC · JPL
201686	2003 UY_{107}	—	October 19, 2003	Kitt Peak	Spacewatch	AGN	1.9 km	MPC · JPL
201687	2003 UH_{109}	—	October 19, 2003	Kitt Peak	Spacewatch	·	2.0 km	MPC · JPL
201688	2003 UA_{114}	—	October 20, 2003	Socorro	LINEAR	·	3.3 km	MPC · JPL
201689	2003 UO_{116}	—	October 21, 2003	Socorro	LINEAR	·	3.4 km	MPC · JPL
201690	2003 UO_{119}	—	October 18, 2003	Kitt Peak	Spacewatch	EOS	3.5 km	MPC · JPL
201691	2003 UW_{119}	—	October 18, 2003	Kitt Peak	Spacewatch	·	2.8 km	MPC · JPL
201692	2003 UC_{121}	—	October 18, 2003	Kitt Peak	Spacewatch	·	3.1 km	MPC · JPL
201693	2003 UC_{124}	—	October 20, 2003	Palomar	NEAT	·	2.2 km	MPC · JPL
201694	2003 UA_{128}	—	October 21, 2003	Kitt Peak	Spacewatch	·	2.7 km	MPC · JPL
201695	2003 UQ_{131}	—	October 19, 2003	Palomar	NEAT	·	3.1 km	MPC · JPL
201696	2003 UT_{131}	—	October 19, 2003	Palomar	NEAT	·	3.2 km	MPC · JPL
201697	2003 UX_{131}	—	October 19, 2003	Palomar	NEAT	TEL	2.4 km	MPC · JPL
201698	2003 UX_{132}	—	October 19, 2003	Palomar	NEAT	·	2.2 km	MPC · JPL
201699	2003 UH_{133}	—	October 20, 2003	Palomar	NEAT	·	4.2 km	MPC · JPL
201700	2003 UJ_{135}	—	October 21, 2003	Palomar	NEAT	·	3.5 km	MPC · JPL

== 201701–201800 ==
back to top

Designation			Discovery			Properties		Ref
Permanent	Provisional	Named after	Date	Site	Discoverer(s)	Category	Diam.	Ref
201701	2003 UD_{139}	—	October 16, 2003	Palomar	NEAT	·	3.0 km	MPC · JPL
201702	2003 UW_{140}	—	October 16, 2003	Palomar	NEAT	·	7.4 km	MPC · JPL
201703	2003 UY_{140}	—	October 16, 2003	Palomar	NEAT	GEF	2.2 km	MPC · JPL
201704	2003 UK_{150}	—	October 20, 2003	Socorro	LINEAR	·	2.5 km	MPC · JPL
201705	2003 UE_{159}	—	October 20, 2003	Kitt Peak	Spacewatch	·	1.8 km	MPC · JPL
201706	2003 UO_{162}	—	October 21, 2003	Socorro	LINEAR	·	3.7 km	MPC · JPL
201707	2003 UC_{163}	—	October 21, 2003	Socorro	LINEAR	·	5.5 km	MPC · JPL
201708	2003 UJ_{163}	—	October 21, 2003	Socorro	LINEAR	·	3.4 km	MPC · JPL
201709	2003 UC_{164}	—	October 21, 2003	Socorro	LINEAR	·	2.8 km	MPC · JPL
201710	2003 UO_{167}	—	October 22, 2003	Socorro	LINEAR	slow	3.1 km	MPC · JPL
201711	2003 UF_{168}	—	October 22, 2003	Socorro	LINEAR	·	3.6 km	MPC · JPL
201712	2003 UQ_{172}	—	October 20, 2003	Socorro	LINEAR	·	3.5 km	MPC · JPL
201713	2003 UA_{176}	—	October 21, 2003	Anderson Mesa	LONEOS	·	2.5 km	MPC · JPL
201714	2003 UA_{179}	—	October 21, 2003	Palomar	NEAT	·	3.3 km	MPC · JPL
201715	2003 UM_{181}	—	October 21, 2003	Socorro	LINEAR	AGN	2.0 km	MPC · JPL
201716	2003 UN_{181}	—	October 21, 2003	Kitt Peak	Spacewatch	·	3.3 km	MPC · JPL
201717	2003 UM_{183}	—	October 21, 2003	Palomar	NEAT	KOR	2.0 km	MPC · JPL
201718	2003 UL_{186}	—	October 22, 2003	Socorro	LINEAR	HOF	3.6 km	MPC · JPL
201719	2003 UD_{189}	—	October 22, 2003	Kitt Peak	Spacewatch	·	3.2 km	MPC · JPL
201720	2003 UO_{189}	—	October 22, 2003	Kitt Peak	Spacewatch	·	3.5 km	MPC · JPL
201721	2003 UP_{189}	—	October 22, 2003	Kitt Peak	Spacewatch	·	3.9 km	MPC · JPL
201722	2003 UK_{190}	—	October 22, 2003	Kitt Peak	Spacewatch	·	2.2 km	MPC · JPL
201723	2003 UG_{192}	—	October 23, 2003	Anderson Mesa	LONEOS	NEM	3.8 km	MPC · JPL
201724	2003 UM_{193}	—	October 20, 2003	Socorro	LINEAR	HYG	5.2 km	MPC · JPL
201725	2003 UE_{194}	—	October 20, 2003	Socorro	LINEAR	·	3.4 km	MPC · JPL
201726	2003 UH_{195}	—	October 20, 2003	Kitt Peak	Spacewatch	·	3.2 km	MPC · JPL
201727	2003 UB_{196}	—	October 20, 2003	Kitt Peak	Spacewatch	·	2.9 km	MPC · JPL
201728	2003 UM_{199}	—	October 21, 2003	Socorro	LINEAR	·	4.0 km	MPC · JPL
201729	2003 UO_{219}	—	October 21, 2003	Kitt Peak	Spacewatch	·	3.2 km	MPC · JPL
201730	2003 US_{224}	—	October 22, 2003	Kitt Peak	Spacewatch	·	3.0 km	MPC · JPL
201731	2003 UY_{225}	—	October 22, 2003	Kitt Peak	Spacewatch	AGN	1.7 km	MPC · JPL
201732	2003 UG_{228}	—	October 23, 2003	Anderson Mesa	LONEOS	·	3.6 km	MPC · JPL
201733	2003 UQ_{248}	—	October 25, 2003	Kitt Peak	Spacewatch	·	3.1 km	MPC · JPL
201734	2003 UQ_{250}	—	October 25, 2003	Socorro	LINEAR	·	3.4 km	MPC · JPL
201735	2003 UY_{251}	—	October 26, 2003	Catalina	CSS	·	3.7 km	MPC · JPL
201736	2003 UZ_{254}	—	October 25, 2003	Kitt Peak	Spacewatch	·	3.3 km	MPC · JPL
201737	2003 UF_{258}	—	October 25, 2003	Kitt Peak	Spacewatch	·	4.3 km	MPC · JPL
201738	2003 UT_{262}	—	October 26, 2003	Haleakala	NEAT	·	5.2 km	MPC · JPL
201739	2003 UQ_{263}	—	October 27, 2003	Socorro	LINEAR	·	2.7 km	MPC · JPL
201740	2003 UQ_{264}	—	October 27, 2003	Socorro	LINEAR	TEL	2.7 km	MPC · JPL
201741	2003 UR_{264}	—	October 27, 2003	Socorro	LINEAR	·	1.7 km	MPC · JPL
201742	2003 UJ_{265}	—	October 27, 2003	Socorro	LINEAR	MRX	1.6 km	MPC · JPL
201743	2003 UZ_{265}	—	October 28, 2003	Socorro	LINEAR	·	2.4 km	MPC · JPL
201744	2003 UB_{266}	—	October 28, 2003	Socorro	LINEAR	·	3.4 km	MPC · JPL
201745	2003 UE_{268}	—	October 28, 2003	Socorro	LINEAR	HOF	4.0 km	MPC · JPL
201746	2003 UN_{276}	—	October 29, 2003	Haleakala	NEAT	slow	5.2 km	MPC · JPL
201747	2003 UN_{280}	—	October 27, 2003	Socorro	LINEAR	·	4.0 km	MPC · JPL
201748	2003 UT_{293}	—	October 18, 2003	Socorro	LINEAR	EUP	5.0 km	MPC · JPL
201749	2003 UH_{297}	—	October 16, 2003	Kitt Peak	Spacewatch	(13314)	3.9 km	MPC · JPL
201750	2003 UY_{306}	—	October 18, 2003	Kitt Peak	Spacewatch	·	2.4 km	MPC · JPL
201751 Steinhardt	2003 UZ_{314}	Steinhardt	October 23, 2003	Apache Point	SDSS	·	2.8 km	MPC · JPL
201752	2003 UJ_{323}	—	October 16, 2003	Kitt Peak	Spacewatch	·	1.8 km	MPC · JPL
201753	2003 UM_{340}	—	October 18, 2003	Kitt Peak	Spacewatch	KOR	2.0 km	MPC · JPL
201754	2003 UN_{359}	—	October 19, 2003	Kitt Peak	Spacewatch	·	1.9 km	MPC · JPL
201755	2003 UO_{371}	—	October 22, 2003	Apache Point	SDSS	·	2.7 km	MPC · JPL
201756	2003 VR_{4}	—	November 15, 2003	Kitt Peak	Spacewatch	·	2.6 km	MPC · JPL
201757	2003 WZ_{11}	—	November 18, 2003	Palomar	NEAT	·	3.5 km	MPC · JPL
201758	2003 WC_{26}	—	November 21, 2003	Nogales	M. Schwartz, P. R. Holvorcem	·	2.9 km	MPC · JPL
201759	2003 WG_{33}	—	November 18, 2003	Palomar	NEAT	EOS	3.1 km	MPC · JPL
201760	2003 WJ_{36}	—	November 19, 2003	Kitt Peak	Spacewatch	·	3.5 km	MPC · JPL
201761	2003 WX_{36}	—	November 19, 2003	Socorro	LINEAR	·	2.3 km	MPC · JPL
201762	2003 WN_{37}	—	November 19, 2003	Socorro	LINEAR	EOS	3.4 km	MPC · JPL
201763	2003 WX_{37}	—	November 19, 2003	Socorro	LINEAR	·	5.0 km	MPC · JPL
201764	2003 WV_{38}	—	November 19, 2003	Socorro	LINEAR	·	4.9 km	MPC · JPL
201765	2003 WA_{43}	—	November 16, 2003	Catalina	CSS	GEF	2.4 km	MPC · JPL
201766	2003 WE_{45}	—	November 19, 2003	Palomar	NEAT	·	3.5 km	MPC · JPL
201767	2003 WT_{45}	—	November 19, 2003	Palomar	NEAT	EUN	1.8 km	MPC · JPL
201768	2003 WQ_{67}	—	November 19, 2003	Kitt Peak	Spacewatch	KOR	2.0 km	MPC · JPL
201769	2003 WE_{71}	—	November 20, 2003	Palomar	NEAT	MAR	1.9 km	MPC · JPL
201770	2003 WL_{81}	—	November 20, 2003	Kitt Peak	Spacewatch	EOS	3.5 km	MPC · JPL
201771	2003 WS_{82}	—	November 19, 2003	Palomar	NEAT	slow	4.2 km	MPC · JPL
201772	2003 WP_{83}	—	November 21, 2003	Socorro	LINEAR	·	3.4 km	MPC · JPL
201773	2003 WO_{85}	—	November 20, 2003	Socorro	LINEAR	·	3.2 km	MPC · JPL
201774	2003 WV_{85}	—	November 20, 2003	Socorro	LINEAR	·	6.7 km	MPC · JPL
201775	2003 WA_{93}	—	November 19, 2003	Anderson Mesa	LONEOS	AGN	1.7 km	MPC · JPL
201776	2003 WQ_{94}	—	November 19, 2003	Anderson Mesa	LONEOS	AGN	1.9 km	MPC · JPL
201777 Deronda	2003 WE_{98}	Deronda	November 24, 2003	Wrightwood	J. W. Young	·	4.3 km	MPC · JPL
201778	2003 WL_{103}	—	November 21, 2003	Socorro	LINEAR	·	4.7 km	MPC · JPL
201779	2003 WD_{104}	—	November 21, 2003	Socorro	LINEAR	EOS	3.3 km	MPC · JPL
201780	2003 WJ_{105}	—	November 21, 2003	Socorro	LINEAR	·	2.8 km	MPC · JPL
201781	2003 WC_{107}	—	November 22, 2003	Socorro	LINEAR	·	4.9 km	MPC · JPL
201782	2003 WR_{107}	—	November 23, 2003	Catalina	CSS	H	810 m	MPC · JPL
201783	2003 WU_{109}	—	November 20, 2003	Socorro	LINEAR	·	3.2 km	MPC · JPL
201784	2003 WS_{113}	—	November 20, 2003	Socorro	LINEAR	·	4.9 km	MPC · JPL
201785	2003 WF_{124}	—	November 20, 2003	Socorro	LINEAR	·	5.7 km	MPC · JPL
201786	2003 WT_{126}	—	November 20, 2003	Socorro	LINEAR	·	5.6 km	MPC · JPL
201787	2003 WV_{131}	—	November 19, 2003	Anderson Mesa	LONEOS	·	2.0 km	MPC · JPL
201788	2003 WF_{134}	—	November 21, 2003	Socorro	LINEAR	·	3.3 km	MPC · JPL
201789	2003 WK_{135}	—	November 21, 2003	Socorro	LINEAR	EOS	3.3 km	MPC · JPL
201790	2003 WO_{135}	—	November 21, 2003	Socorro	LINEAR	·	3.9 km	MPC · JPL
201791	2003 WY_{137}	—	November 21, 2003	Socorro	LINEAR	·	2.9 km	MPC · JPL
201792	2003 WF_{139}	—	November 21, 2003	Socorro	LINEAR	·	4.9 km	MPC · JPL
201793	2003 WQ_{142}	—	November 21, 2003	Socorro	LINEAR	·	7.6 km	MPC · JPL
201794	2003 WA_{145}	—	November 21, 2003	Socorro	LINEAR	·	3.7 km	MPC · JPL
201795	2003 WE_{145}	—	November 21, 2003	Socorro	LINEAR	·	2.6 km	MPC · JPL
201796	2003 WY_{150}	—	November 24, 2003	Anderson Mesa	LONEOS	·	3.8 km	MPC · JPL
201797	2003 WS_{154}	—	November 26, 2003	Socorro	LINEAR	·	2.5 km	MPC · JPL
201798	2003 WJ_{161}	—	November 30, 2003	Kitt Peak	Spacewatch	·	3.2 km	MPC · JPL
201799	2003 WL_{168}	—	November 19, 2003	Palomar	NEAT	·	3.8 km	MPC · JPL
201800	2003 WM_{189}	—	November 20, 2003	Palomar	NEAT	·	3.2 km	MPC · JPL

== 201801–201900 ==
back to top

Designation			Discovery			Properties		Ref
Permanent	Provisional	Named after	Date	Site	Discoverer(s)	Category	Diam.	Ref
201801	2003 WM_{192}	—	November 20, 2003	Socorro	LINEAR	·	3.0 km	MPC · JPL
201802	2003 XL_{3}	—	December 1, 2003	Socorro	LINEAR	DOR	4.5 km	MPC · JPL
201803	2003 XX_{3}	—	December 1, 2003	Socorro	LINEAR	·	3.5 km	MPC · JPL
201804	2003 XL_{6}	—	December 3, 2003	Socorro	LINEAR	·	5.3 km	MPC · JPL
201805	2003 XM_{13}	—	December 14, 2003	Palomar	NEAT	·	3.6 km	MPC · JPL
201806	2003 XL_{14}	—	December 15, 2003	Socorro	LINEAR	H	880 m	MPC · JPL
201807	2003 XC_{19}	—	December 14, 2003	Kitt Peak	Spacewatch	·	4.8 km	MPC · JPL
201808	2003 XX_{19}	—	December 14, 2003	Kitt Peak	Spacewatch	·	2.8 km	MPC · JPL
201809	2003 XK_{20}	—	December 14, 2003	Kitt Peak	Spacewatch	·	6.5 km	MPC · JPL
201810	2003 XL_{26}	—	December 1, 2003	Socorro	LINEAR	·	3.2 km	MPC · JPL
201811	2003 XT_{30}	—	December 1, 2003	Kitt Peak	Spacewatch	·	3.0 km	MPC · JPL
201812	2003 YY_{1}	—	December 18, 2003	Nashville	Clingan, R.	·	2.9 km	MPC · JPL
201813	2003 YN_{5}	—	December 16, 2003	Catalina	CSS	·	2.9 km	MPC · JPL
201814	2003 YN_{12}	—	December 17, 2003	Socorro	LINEAR	·	3.8 km	MPC · JPL
201815	2003 YH_{15}	—	December 17, 2003	Socorro	LINEAR	EOS	2.9 km	MPC · JPL
201816	2003 YO_{15}	—	December 17, 2003	Kitt Peak	Spacewatch	·	4.3 km	MPC · JPL
201817	2003 YG_{17}	—	December 17, 2003	Kitt Peak	Spacewatch	·	3.1 km	MPC · JPL
201818	2003 YJ_{19}	—	December 17, 2003	Kitt Peak	Spacewatch	KOR	2.0 km	MPC · JPL
201819	2003 YT_{20}	—	December 17, 2003	Kitt Peak	Spacewatch	·	4.7 km	MPC · JPL
201820	2003 YO_{25}	—	December 18, 2003	Socorro	LINEAR	·	6.5 km	MPC · JPL
201821	2003 YR_{25}	—	December 18, 2003	Socorro	LINEAR	·	4.6 km	MPC · JPL
201822	2003 YW_{25}	—	December 18, 2003	Socorro	LINEAR	·	3.7 km	MPC · JPL
201823	2003 YX_{26}	—	December 16, 2003	Anderson Mesa	LONEOS	·	6.5 km	MPC · JPL
201824	2003 YH_{29}	—	December 17, 2003	Kitt Peak	Spacewatch	·	4.5 km	MPC · JPL
201825	2003 YN_{29}	—	December 17, 2003	Kitt Peak	Spacewatch	·	6.3 km	MPC · JPL
201826	2003 YT_{29}	—	December 17, 2003	Kitt Peak	Spacewatch	·	5.7 km	MPC · JPL
201827	2003 YG_{30}	—	December 18, 2003	Socorro	LINEAR	·	3.4 km	MPC · JPL
201828	2003 YP_{30}	—	December 18, 2003	Socorro	LINEAR	HYG	4.6 km	MPC · JPL
201829	2003 YP_{32}	—	December 18, 2003	Haleakala	NEAT	·	6.0 km	MPC · JPL
201830	2003 YX_{49}	—	December 18, 2003	Socorro	LINEAR	·	3.0 km	MPC · JPL
201831	2003 YK_{53}	—	December 19, 2003	Socorro	LINEAR	KOR	2.1 km	MPC · JPL
201832	2003 YD_{54}	—	December 19, 2003	Kitt Peak	Spacewatch	·	2.8 km	MPC · JPL
201833	2003 YQ_{57}	—	December 19, 2003	Socorro	LINEAR	AEO	1.9 km	MPC · JPL
201834	2003 YS_{57}	—	December 19, 2003	Socorro	LINEAR	·	3.5 km	MPC · JPL
201835	2003 YB_{59}	—	December 19, 2003	Socorro	LINEAR	·	3.6 km	MPC · JPL
201836	2003 YA_{61}	—	December 19, 2003	Socorro	LINEAR	·	4.7 km	MPC · JPL
201837	2003 YE_{61}	—	December 19, 2003	Socorro	LINEAR	·	4.4 km	MPC · JPL
201838	2003 YM_{66}	—	December 20, 2003	Socorro	LINEAR	·	7.4 km	MPC · JPL
201839	2003 YH_{72}	—	December 18, 2003	Socorro	LINEAR	·	2.8 km	MPC · JPL
201840	2003 YW_{74}	—	December 18, 2003	Socorro	LINEAR	HYG	3.8 km	MPC · JPL
201841	2003 YV_{78}	—	December 18, 2003	Socorro	LINEAR	·	4.3 km	MPC · JPL
201842	2003 YS_{80}	—	December 18, 2003	Socorro	LINEAR	·	4.0 km	MPC · JPL
201843	2003 YK_{81}	—	December 18, 2003	Socorro	LINEAR	·	5.9 km	MPC · JPL
201844	2003 YW_{82}	—	December 18, 2003	Kitt Peak	Spacewatch	URS	4.2 km	MPC · JPL
201845	2003 YB_{85}	—	December 19, 2003	Socorro	LINEAR	·	5.3 km	MPC · JPL
201846	2003 YM_{87}	—	December 19, 2003	Socorro	LINEAR	EOS	3.3 km	MPC · JPL
201847	2003 YB_{88}	—	December 19, 2003	Socorro	LINEAR	·	3.6 km	MPC · JPL
201848	2003 YR_{90}	—	December 20, 2003	Socorro	LINEAR	EOS	2.8 km	MPC · JPL
201849	2003 YF_{91}	—	December 20, 2003	Socorro	LINEAR	EOS	2.8 km	MPC · JPL
201850	2003 YJ_{92}	—	December 21, 2003	Catalina	CSS	·	2.9 km	MPC · JPL
201851	2003 YJ_{98}	—	December 19, 2003	Socorro	LINEAR	·	3.2 km	MPC · JPL
201852	2003 YV_{98}	—	December 19, 2003	Socorro	LINEAR	LUT	8.3 km	MPC · JPL
201853	2003 YJ_{105}	—	December 22, 2003	Socorro	LINEAR	·	5.8 km	MPC · JPL
201854	2003 YU_{106}	—	December 22, 2003	Catalina	CSS	·	5.1 km	MPC · JPL
201855	2003 YW_{116}	—	December 27, 2003	Socorro	LINEAR	THM	4.8 km	MPC · JPL
201856	2003 YF_{118}	—	December 28, 2003	Socorro	LINEAR	H	1.0 km	MPC · JPL
201857	2003 YS_{126}	—	December 27, 2003	Socorro	LINEAR	·	4.9 km	MPC · JPL
201858	2003 YW_{129}	—	December 27, 2003	Socorro	LINEAR	·	7.2 km	MPC · JPL
201859	2003 YJ_{130}	—	December 28, 2003	Socorro	LINEAR	·	3.5 km	MPC · JPL
201860	2003 YP_{130}	—	December 28, 2003	Socorro	LINEAR	(21885)	6.0 km	MPC · JPL
201861	2003 YD_{132}	—	December 28, 2003	Socorro	LINEAR	VER	5.6 km	MPC · JPL
201862	2003 YR_{133}	—	December 28, 2003	Socorro	LINEAR	·	5.9 km	MPC · JPL
201863	2003 YB_{134}	—	December 28, 2003	Socorro	LINEAR	·	4.1 km	MPC · JPL
201864	2003 YY_{140}	—	December 28, 2003	Socorro	LINEAR	·	3.3 km	MPC · JPL
201865	2003 YU_{143}	—	December 28, 2003	Socorro	LINEAR	·	4.7 km	MPC · JPL
201866	2003 YV_{145}	—	December 28, 2003	Socorro	LINEAR	·	3.4 km	MPC · JPL
201867	2003 YS_{146}	—	December 28, 2003	Socorro	LINEAR	·	3.6 km	MPC · JPL
201868	2003 YP_{148}	—	December 29, 2003	Catalina	CSS	·	5.2 km	MPC · JPL
201869	2003 YU_{150}	—	December 29, 2003	Catalina	CSS	·	6.4 km	MPC · JPL
201870	2003 YG_{153}	—	December 29, 2003	Socorro	LINEAR	·	2.9 km	MPC · JPL
201871	2003 YN_{154}	—	December 29, 2003	Socorro	LINEAR	·	3.2 km	MPC · JPL
201872	2003 YE_{161}	—	December 17, 2003	Kitt Peak	Spacewatch	TEL	2.0 km	MPC · JPL
201873	2003 YU_{162}	—	December 17, 2003	Socorro	LINEAR	·	3.6 km	MPC · JPL
201874	2003 YV_{166}	—	December 17, 2003	Kitt Peak	Spacewatch	EOS	2.9 km	MPC · JPL
201875	2003 YY_{168}	—	December 18, 2003	Socorro	LINEAR	·	3.4 km	MPC · JPL
201876	2003 YB_{171}	—	December 18, 2003	Kitt Peak	Spacewatch	LIX	4.3 km	MPC · JPL
201877	2003 YT_{175}	—	December 22, 2003	Palomar	NEAT	·	3.7 km	MPC · JPL
201878	2003 YF_{180}	—	December 17, 2003	Socorro	LINEAR	TIR	2.6 km	MPC · JPL
201879	2004 AC_{1}	—	January 5, 2004	Socorro	LINEAR	EUP	7.3 km	MPC · JPL
201880	2004 AP_{2}	—	January 13, 2004	Anderson Mesa	LONEOS	·	4.4 km	MPC · JPL
201881	2004 AA_{4}	—	January 13, 2004	Anderson Mesa	LONEOS	·	4.6 km	MPC · JPL
201882	2004 AC_{7}	—	January 13, 2004	Palomar	NEAT	·	3.6 km	MPC · JPL
201883	2004 AX_{7}	—	January 13, 2004	Anderson Mesa	LONEOS	·	4.7 km	MPC · JPL
201884	2004 AU_{9}	—	January 15, 2004	Kitt Peak	Spacewatch	·	4.4 km	MPC · JPL
201885	2004 AN_{10}	—	January 13, 2004	Anderson Mesa	LONEOS	H	810 m	MPC · JPL
201886	2004 AW_{12}	—	January 13, 2004	Kitt Peak	Spacewatch	THM	2.6 km	MPC · JPL
201887	2004 AD_{14}	—	January 13, 2004	Kitt Peak	Spacewatch	·	3.4 km	MPC · JPL
201888	2004 BB_{2}	—	January 16, 2004	Palomar	NEAT	·	3.0 km	MPC · JPL
201889	2004 BM_{9}	—	January 16, 2004	Palomar	NEAT	·	3.7 km	MPC · JPL
201890	2004 BB_{13}	—	January 17, 2004	Palomar	NEAT	·	4.5 km	MPC · JPL
201891	2004 BG_{14}	—	January 17, 2004	Palomar	NEAT	·	6.1 km	MPC · JPL
201892	2004 BK_{16}	—	January 18, 2004	Palomar	NEAT	·	5.9 km	MPC · JPL
201893	2004 BR_{17}	—	January 18, 2004	Catalina	CSS	·	4.5 km	MPC · JPL
201894	2004 BT_{18}	—	January 18, 2004	Kitt Peak	Spacewatch	·	5.9 km	MPC · JPL
201895	2004 BK_{19}	—	January 17, 2004	Palomar	NEAT	EOS	5.0 km	MPC · JPL
201896	2004 BX_{25}	—	January 20, 2004	Socorro	LINEAR	·	3.4 km	MPC · JPL
201897	2004 BG_{33}	—	January 19, 2004	Kitt Peak	Spacewatch	·	5.5 km	MPC · JPL
201898	2004 BN_{33}	—	January 19, 2004	Kitt Peak	Spacewatch	·	3.1 km	MPC · JPL
201899	2004 BD_{47}	—	January 21, 2004	Socorro	LINEAR	BRA	2.5 km	MPC · JPL
201900	2004 BR_{56}	—	January 23, 2004	Anderson Mesa	LONEOS	·	2.9 km	MPC · JPL

== 201901–202000 ==
back to top

Designation			Discovery			Properties		Ref
Permanent	Provisional	Named after	Date	Site	Discoverer(s)	Category	Diam.	Ref
201901	2004 BG_{64}	—	January 22, 2004	Socorro	LINEAR	THM	3.5 km	MPC · JPL
201902	2004 BL_{64}	—	January 22, 2004	Socorro	LINEAR	·	1.6 km	MPC · JPL
201903	2004 BW_{68}	—	January 27, 2004	Socorro	LINEAR	T_{j} (2.99)	7.5 km	MPC · JPL
201904	2004 BC_{85}	—	January 29, 2004	Socorro	LINEAR	H	920 m	MPC · JPL
201905	2004 BH_{89}	—	January 23, 2004	Socorro	LINEAR	·	4.5 km	MPC · JPL
201906	2004 BV_{90}	—	January 24, 2004	Socorro	LINEAR	HYG	4.8 km	MPC · JPL
201907	2004 BM_{91}	—	January 24, 2004	Socorro	LINEAR	HYG	4.8 km	MPC · JPL
201908	2004 BJ_{97}	—	January 25, 2004	Haleakala	NEAT	TIR	4.2 km	MPC · JPL
201909	2004 BF_{110}	—	January 28, 2004	Catalina	CSS	·	6.6 km	MPC · JPL
201910	2004 BM_{111}	—	January 29, 2004	Catalina	CSS	H	920 m	MPC · JPL
201911	2004 BU_{113}	—	January 28, 2004	Kitt Peak	Spacewatch	EOS	3.9 km	MPC · JPL
201912	2004 BB_{116}	—	January 26, 2004	Anderson Mesa	LONEOS	·	3.7 km	MPC · JPL
201913	2004 BF_{116}	—	January 26, 2004	Anderson Mesa	LONEOS	EOS	2.8 km	MPC · JPL
201914	2004 BP_{119}	—	January 30, 2004	Catalina	CSS	·	5.3 km	MPC · JPL
201915	2004 BH_{133}	—	January 17, 2004	Palomar	NEAT	·	4.5 km	MPC · JPL
201916	2004 BN_{141}	—	January 19, 2004	Kitt Peak	Spacewatch	·	2.5 km	MPC · JPL
201917	2004 BO_{149}	—	January 16, 2004	Kitt Peak	Spacewatch	HYG	3.1 km	MPC · JPL
201918	2004 CA_{4}	—	February 10, 2004	Palomar	NEAT	·	4.5 km	MPC · JPL
201919	2004 CC_{5}	—	February 10, 2004	Catalina	CSS	·	5.5 km	MPC · JPL
201920	2004 CD_{6}	—	February 10, 2004	Palomar	NEAT	·	3.5 km	MPC · JPL
201921	2004 CN_{51}	—	February 15, 2004	Socorro	LINEAR	EOS	3.2 km	MPC · JPL
201922	2004 CQ_{52}	—	February 11, 2004	Palomar	NEAT	·	3.8 km	MPC · JPL
201923	2004 CV_{66}	—	February 15, 2004	Socorro	LINEAR	·	6.8 km	MPC · JPL
201924	2004 CB_{79}	—	February 11, 2004	Palomar	NEAT	THM	5.4 km	MPC · JPL
201925	2004 CT_{83}	—	February 12, 2004	Kitt Peak	Spacewatch	·	4.9 km	MPC · JPL
201926	2004 CU_{94}	—	February 12, 2004	Palomar	NEAT	·	4.3 km	MPC · JPL
201927	2004 CC_{97}	—	February 13, 2004	Palomar	NEAT	CYB	6.5 km	MPC · JPL
201928	2004 CE_{104}	—	February 13, 2004	Palomar	NEAT	·	4.5 km	MPC · JPL
201929	2004 CS_{120}	—	February 12, 2004	Kitt Peak	Spacewatch	·	4.4 km	MPC · JPL
201930	2004 DR_{20}	—	February 17, 2004	Socorro	LINEAR	·	3.3 km	MPC · JPL
201931	2004 DM_{25}	—	February 20, 2004	Socorro	LINEAR	H	800 m	MPC · JPL
201932	2004 DW_{28}	—	February 17, 2004	Kitt Peak	Spacewatch	·	3.2 km	MPC · JPL
201933	2004 DO_{45}	—	February 26, 2004	Desert Eagle	W. K. Y. Yeung	LIX	5.9 km	MPC · JPL
201934	2004 DP_{50}	—	February 23, 2004	Socorro	LINEAR	·	2.2 km	MPC · JPL
201935 Robertbraun	2004 DB_{67}	Robertbraun	February 26, 2004	Kitt Peak	M. W. Buie	EOS	3.2 km	MPC · JPL
201936	2004 EV_{14}	—	March 11, 2004	Palomar	NEAT	·	3.9 km	MPC · JPL
201937	2004 EA_{16}	—	March 12, 2004	Palomar	NEAT	HIL · 3:2	8.4 km	MPC · JPL
201938	2004 EN_{24}	—	March 9, 2004	Catalina	CSS	H	1.1 km	MPC · JPL
201939	2004 EQ_{39}	—	March 15, 2004	Kitt Peak	Spacewatch	·	2.7 km	MPC · JPL
201940	2004 EO_{43}	—	March 15, 2004	Palomar	NEAT	·	3.7 km	MPC · JPL
201941	2004 EY_{94}	—	March 15, 2004	Socorro	LINEAR	·	3.5 km	MPC · JPL
201942	2004 FS_{1}	—	March 17, 2004	Catalina	CSS	H	630 m	MPC · JPL
201943	2004 GU_{19}	—	April 15, 2004	Socorro	LINEAR	·	1.8 km	MPC · JPL
201944	2004 GW_{19}	—	April 13, 2004	Palomar	NEAT	·	1.0 km	MPC · JPL
201945	2004 GD_{20}	—	April 15, 2004	Desert Eagle	W. K. Y. Yeung	·	1.7 km	MPC · JPL
201946	2004 GO_{28}	—	April 14, 2004	Catalina	CSS	H	970 m	MPC · JPL
201947	2004 HG_{40}	—	April 19, 2004	Kitt Peak	Spacewatch	·	830 m	MPC · JPL
201948	2004 HK_{70}	—	April 24, 2004	Kitt Peak	Spacewatch	AST	1.8 km	MPC · JPL
201949	2004 JF_{1}	—	May 9, 2004	Haleakala	NEAT	H	990 m	MPC · JPL
201950	2004 JT_{11}	—	May 12, 2004	Socorro	LINEAR	H	860 m	MPC · JPL
201951	2004 JV_{26}	—	May 15, 2004	Socorro	LINEAR	·	1.1 km	MPC · JPL
201952	2004 JS_{43}	—	May 12, 2004	Anderson Mesa	LONEOS	·	930 m	MPC · JPL
201953	2004 JO_{47}	—	May 13, 2004	Kitt Peak	Spacewatch	·	1.7 km	MPC · JPL
201954	2004 KO_{3}	—	May 16, 2004	Socorro	LINEAR	·	1.6 km	MPC · JPL
201955	2004 LD_{13}	—	June 11, 2004	Campo Imperatore	CINEOS	·	1.3 km	MPC · JPL
201956	2004 LR_{16}	—	June 13, 2004	Catalina	CSS	·	1.6 km	MPC · JPL
201957	2004 ME_{7}	—	June 24, 2004	Campo Imperatore	CINEOS	·	980 m	MPC · JPL
201958	2004 NF_{7}	—	July 11, 2004	Palomar	NEAT	V	1.1 km	MPC · JPL
201959	2004 NS_{12}	—	July 11, 2004	Socorro	LINEAR	·	1.7 km	MPC · JPL
201960	2004 NX_{14}	—	July 11, 2004	Socorro	LINEAR	·	1.0 km	MPC · JPL
201961	2004 NB_{16}	—	July 11, 2004	Socorro	LINEAR	·	1.8 km	MPC · JPL
201962	2004 NN_{20}	—	July 14, 2004	Socorro	LINEAR	V	760 m	MPC · JPL
201963	2004 NW_{24}	—	July 15, 2004	Socorro	LINEAR	·	1.4 km	MPC · JPL
201964	2004 NW_{26}	—	July 11, 2004	Socorro	LINEAR	·	1.6 km	MPC · JPL
201965	2004 OE_{3}	—	July 16, 2004	Socorro	LINEAR	·	1.6 km	MPC · JPL
201966	2004 ON_{11}	—	July 25, 2004	Anderson Mesa	LONEOS	·	2.1 km	MPC · JPL
201967	2004 PB_{13}	—	August 7, 2004	Palomar	NEAT	·	990 m	MPC · JPL
201968	2004 PG_{17}	—	August 8, 2004	Campo Imperatore	CINEOS	·	1.4 km	MPC · JPL
201969	2004 PK_{18}	—	August 8, 2004	Anderson Mesa	LONEOS	·	1.5 km	MPC · JPL
201970	2004 PU_{18}	—	August 8, 2004	Anderson Mesa	LONEOS	·	1.1 km	MPC · JPL
201971	2004 PA_{19}	—	August 8, 2004	Anderson Mesa	LONEOS	·	1.1 km	MPC · JPL
201972	2004 PP_{25}	—	August 8, 2004	Socorro	LINEAR	·	990 m	MPC · JPL
201973	2004 PA_{29}	—	August 6, 2004	Palomar	NEAT	·	1.4 km	MPC · JPL
201974	2004 PR_{29}	—	August 7, 2004	Palomar	NEAT	·	870 m	MPC · JPL
201975	2004 PU_{32}	—	August 8, 2004	Socorro	LINEAR	·	1.6 km	MPC · JPL
201976	2004 PA_{33}	—	August 8, 2004	Socorro	LINEAR	·	1.1 km	MPC · JPL
201977	2004 PQ_{34}	—	August 8, 2004	Anderson Mesa	LONEOS	NYS	1.4 km	MPC · JPL
201978	2004 PO_{35}	—	August 8, 2004	Anderson Mesa	LONEOS	·	2.1 km	MPC · JPL
201979	2004 PM_{51}	—	August 8, 2004	Socorro	LINEAR	NYS	1.5 km	MPC · JPL
201980	2004 PW_{51}	—	August 8, 2004	Socorro	LINEAR	·	1.3 km	MPC · JPL
201981	2004 PX_{51}	—	August 8, 2004	Socorro	LINEAR	·	1.3 km	MPC · JPL
201982	2004 PF_{52}	—	August 8, 2004	Socorro	LINEAR	·	2.0 km	MPC · JPL
201983	2004 PJ_{52}	—	August 8, 2004	Socorro	LINEAR	NYS	1.5 km	MPC · JPL
201984	2004 PZ_{52}	—	August 8, 2004	Socorro	LINEAR	·	1.6 km	MPC · JPL
201985	2004 PS_{54}	—	August 8, 2004	Anderson Mesa	LONEOS	NYS	1.8 km	MPC · JPL
201986	2004 PA_{58}	—	August 9, 2004	Socorro	LINEAR	·	1.1 km	MPC · JPL
201987	2004 PA_{66}	—	August 8, 2004	Socorro	LINEAR	·	1.2 km	MPC · JPL
201988	2004 PU_{72}	—	August 8, 2004	Socorro	LINEAR	MAS	800 m	MPC · JPL
201989	2004 PY_{74}	—	August 8, 2004	Anderson Mesa	LONEOS	MAS	770 m	MPC · JPL
201990	2004 PC_{78}	—	August 9, 2004	Socorro	LINEAR	·	1.6 km	MPC · JPL
201991	2004 PE_{83}	—	August 10, 2004	Socorro	LINEAR	·	1.4 km	MPC · JPL
201992	2004 PJ_{84}	—	August 10, 2004	Socorro	LINEAR	NYS	1.7 km	MPC · JPL
201993	2004 PM_{84}	—	August 10, 2004	Socorro	LINEAR	·	2.1 km	MPC · JPL
201994	2004 PA_{85}	—	August 10, 2004	Socorro	LINEAR	NYS	2.1 km	MPC · JPL
201995	2004 PT_{86}	—	August 11, 2004	Socorro	LINEAR	·	1.4 km	MPC · JPL
201996	2004 PQ_{90}	—	August 10, 2004	Socorro	LINEAR	·	2.0 km	MPC · JPL
201997	2004 PL_{97}	—	August 14, 2004	Palomar	NEAT	·	2.5 km	MPC · JPL
201998	2004 PX_{102}	—	August 12, 2004	Socorro	LINEAR	ERI	2.1 km	MPC · JPL
201999	2004 PJ_{103}	—	August 12, 2004	Socorro	LINEAR	·	1.8 km	MPC · JPL
202000	2004 PB_{109}	—	August 11, 2004	Socorro	LINEAR	NYS	1.3 km	MPC · JPL

back to top

== See also ==
- Meanings of minor-planet names: 201001–202000
