= Meanings of minor-planet names: 201001–202000 =

As minor planet discoveries are confirmed, they are given a permanent number by the IAU's Minor Planet Center (MPC), and the discoverers can then submit names for them, following the IAU's naming conventions. The list below concerns those minor planets in the specified number-range that have received names, and explains the meanings of those names.

Official naming citations of newly named small Solar System bodies are approved and published in a bulletin by IAU's Working Group for Small Bodies Nomenclature (WGSBN). Before May 2021, citations were published in MPC's Minor Planet Circulars for many decades. Recent citations can also be found on the JPL Small-Body Database (SBDB). Until his death in 2016, German astronomer Lutz D. Schmadel compiled these citations into the Dictionary of Minor Planet Names (DMP) and regularly updated the collection.

Based on Paul Herget's The Names of the Minor Planets, Schmadel also researched the unclear origin of numerous asteroids, most of which had been named prior to World War II. This article incorporates text from this source, which is in the public domain: SBDB New namings may only be added to this list below after official publication as the preannouncement of names is condemned. The WGSBN publishes a comprehensive guideline for the naming rules of non-cometary small Solar System bodies.

== 201001–201100 ==
Named minor planet	Provisional	This minor planet was named for...	Ref · Catalog
201019 Oliverwhite	2002 CZ_{257}	Oliver L. White (born 1984), a research scientist at the NASA SETI Institute who worked for the New Horizons mission to Pluto as a science team post-doctoral researcher for geophysics investigations	JPL · 201019
201023 Karlwhittenburg	2002 CZ_{264}	Karl E. Whittenburg (born 1966), a mission operations engineer at the Johns Hopkins University Applied Physics Laboratory who worked for the New Horizons mission to Pluto as the Deputy Mission Operations Manager	JPL · 201023

== 201101–201200 ==
back to top

Named minor planet	Provisional	This minor planet was named for...	Ref · Catalog
There are no named minor planets in this number range

== 201201–201300 ==
back to top

Named minor planet	Provisional	This minor planet was named for...	Ref · Catalog
201204 Stevewilliams	2002 PZ_{148}	Stephen P. Williams (born 1953), a software engineer at the Johns Hopkins University Applied Physics Laboratory who worked for the New Horizons mission to Pluto as the Command and Data Handling Engineering Lead	JPL · 201204

== 201301–201400 ==
back to top

Named minor planet	Provisional	This minor planet was named for...	Ref · Catalog
201308 Hansgrade	2002 TK_{69}	Hans Grade (1879–1946), a German aviation pioneer and founder of the first German flight school	JPL · 201308
201372 Sheldon	2002 TY_{349}	Erin Sheldon (born 1974), an American astronomer with the Sloan Digital Sky Survey	JPL · 201372

== 201401–201500 ==
back to top

Named minor planet	Provisional	This minor planet was named for...	Ref · Catalog
201497 Marcelroche	2003 JT_{17}	Marcel Roche (1920–2003), a Venezuela physician, scientist and scientific leader	JPL · 201497

== 201501–201600 ==
back to top

Named minor planet	Provisional	This minor planet was named for...	Ref · Catalog
201511 Ferreret	2003 OY_{5}	The Ferreret toad is a small anuran amphibian of the Alytidae family endemic to the Balearic Islands, specifically to the island of Mallorca.	IAU · 201511

== 201601–201700 ==
back to top

Named minor planet	Provisional	This minor planet was named for...	Ref · Catalog
There are no named minor planets in this number range

== 201701–201800 ==
back to top

Named minor planet	Provisional	This minor planet was named for...	Ref · Catalog
201751 Steinhardt	2003 UZ_{314}	Charles Steinhardt (born 1981), an American astronomer and a contributor to the Sloan Digital Sky Survey	JPL · 201751
201777 Deronda	2003 WE_{98}	Deronda Mayes (born 1957), assistant astronomer at Table Mountain Observatory in California, who operates the 0.4-meter telescope. She is in charge of observatory procurement needs, as well as all annual telescope operational safety reviews, along with TMO property accountability. She is credited with the discovery of asteroid (326975).	JPL · 201777

== 201801–201900 ==
back to top

Named minor planet	Provisional	This minor planet was named for...	Ref · Catalog
There are no named minor planets in this number range

== 201901–202000 ==
back to top

Named minor planet	Provisional	This minor planet was named for...	Ref · Catalog
201935 Robertbraun	2004 DB_{67}	Robert Braun (b. 1965), an aerospace engineer and head of the Johns Hopkins University Applied Physics Laboratory's Space Exploration Sector.	IAU · 201935

back to top

Preceded by 200,001–201,000	Meanings of minor-planet names List of minor planets: 201,001–202,000	Succeeded by 202,001–203,000
