= List of minor planets: 203001–204000 =

The following is a partial list of minor planets, running from minor-planet number 203001 through 204000, inclusive. The primary data for this and other partial lists is based on JPL's "Small-Body Orbital Elements" and data available from the Minor Planet Center. Critical list information is also provided by the MPC, unless otherwise specified from Lowell Observatory. A detailed description of the table's columns and additional sources are given on the main page including a complete list of every page in this series, and a statistical break-up on the dynamical classification of minor planets.

Also see the summary list of all named bodies in numerical and alphabetical order, and the corresponding naming citations for the number range of this particular list. New namings may only be added to this list after official publication, as the preannouncement of names is condemned by the Working Group for Small Bodies Nomenclature of the International Astronomical Union.

Near-Earth obj.	MBA (inner)	MBA (outer)	Centaur
Mars-crosser	MBA (middle)	Jupiter trojan	Trans-Neptunian obj.
Unclassified

== 203001–203100 ==
Designation			Discovery			Properties		Ref
Permanent	Provisional	Named after	Date	Site	Discoverer(s)	Category	Diam.	Ref
203001	1999 VL_{197}	—	November 3, 1999	Catalina	CSS	EUN	1.8 km	MPC · JPL
203002	1999 VZ_{203}	—	November 9, 1999	Anderson Mesa	LONEOS	·	2.9 km	MPC · JPL
203003	1999 VD_{208}	—	November 9, 1999	Kitt Peak	Spacewatch	·	2.0 km	MPC · JPL
203004	1999 VD_{210}	—	November 12, 1999	Socorro	LINEAR	·	2.5 km	MPC · JPL
203005	1999 VA_{211}	—	November 13, 1999	Anderson Mesa	LONEOS	·	2.5 km	MPC · JPL
203006	1999 WS_{12}	—	November 29, 1999	Kitt Peak	Spacewatch	·	1.8 km	MPC · JPL
203007	1999 XB_{30}	—	December 6, 1999	Socorro	LINEAR	·	3.4 km	MPC · JPL
203008	1999 XV_{50}	—	December 7, 1999	Socorro	LINEAR	·	2.4 km	MPC · JPL
203009	1999 XV_{96}	—	December 7, 1999	Socorro	LINEAR	·	3.6 km	MPC · JPL
203010	1999 XJ_{181}	—	December 12, 1999	Socorro	LINEAR	·	2.7 km	MPC · JPL
203011	1999 XH_{183}	—	December 12, 1999	Socorro	LINEAR	·	3.2 km	MPC · JPL
203012	1999 XE_{203}	—	December 12, 1999	Socorro	LINEAR	·	7.1 km	MPC · JPL
203013	1999 XJ_{204}	—	December 12, 1999	Socorro	LINEAR	·	3.3 km	MPC · JPL
203014	1999 XC_{233}	—	December 2, 1999	Anderson Mesa	LONEOS	·	4.9 km	MPC · JPL
203015	1999 YF_{3}	—	December 19, 1999	Socorro	LINEAR	AMO	660 m	MPC · JPL
203016	1999 YP_{4}	—	December 28, 1999	Socorro	LINEAR	·	3.2 km	MPC · JPL
203017	2000 AM_{45}	—	January 3, 2000	Socorro	LINEAR	·	3.5 km	MPC · JPL
203018	2000 AJ_{93}	—	January 4, 2000	Socorro	LINEAR	·	5.1 km	MPC · JPL
203019	2000 AN_{126}	—	January 5, 2000	Socorro	LINEAR	·	2.8 km	MPC · JPL
203020	2000 AW_{127}	—	January 5, 2000	Socorro	LINEAR	·	3.3 km	MPC · JPL
203021	2000 AJ_{152}	—	January 8, 2000	Socorro	LINEAR	BRU	6.0 km	MPC · JPL
203022	2000 AD_{183}	—	January 7, 2000	Socorro	LINEAR	·	3.6 km	MPC · JPL
203023	2000 AM_{208}	—	January 4, 2000	Kitt Peak	Spacewatch	·	3.0 km	MPC · JPL
203024	2000 AL_{212}	—	January 5, 2000	Kitt Peak	Spacewatch	·	2.5 km	MPC · JPL
203025	2000 AO_{225}	—	January 12, 2000	Kitt Peak	Spacewatch	·	2.4 km	MPC · JPL
203026	2000 AN_{226}	—	January 12, 2000	Kitt Peak	Spacewatch	HOF	4.5 km	MPC · JPL
203027	2000 AC_{241}	—	January 7, 2000	Anderson Mesa	LONEOS	·	2.5 km	MPC · JPL
203028	2000 AQ_{252}	—	January 7, 2000	Kitt Peak	Spacewatch	·	2.3 km	MPC · JPL
203029	2000 BR	—	January 28, 2000	Prescott	P. G. Comba	DOR	4.2 km	MPC · JPL
203030	2000 BM_{1}	—	January 27, 2000	Kitt Peak	Spacewatch	·	2.3 km	MPC · JPL
203031	2000 BQ_{10}	—	January 28, 2000	Kitt Peak	Spacewatch	PAD	4.2 km	MPC · JPL
203032	2000 BR_{11}	—	January 26, 2000	Kitt Peak	Spacewatch	·	3.4 km	MPC · JPL
203033	2000 BD_{33}	—	January 29, 2000	Kitt Peak	Spacewatch	DOR	4.0 km	MPC · JPL
203034	2000 BY_{48}	—	January 28, 2000	Kitt Peak	Spacewatch	·	3.0 km	MPC · JPL
203035	2000 CJ_{65}	—	February 3, 2000	Socorro	LINEAR	·	2.3 km	MPC · JPL
203036	2000 CX_{65}	—	February 5, 2000	Socorro	LINEAR	·	2.7 km	MPC · JPL
203037	2000 CE_{79}	—	February 8, 2000	Kitt Peak	Spacewatch	PAD	4.8 km	MPC · JPL
203038	2000 CE_{113}	—	February 8, 2000	Kitt Peak	Spacewatch	DOR	4.2 km	MPC · JPL
203039	2000 DG_{10}	—	February 26, 2000	Kitt Peak	Spacewatch	KOR	1.9 km	MPC · JPL
203040	2000 DH_{11}	—	February 27, 2000	Kitt Peak	Spacewatch	·	3.8 km	MPC · JPL
203041	2000 DE_{36}	—	February 29, 2000	Socorro	LINEAR	·	850 m	MPC · JPL
203042	2000 DZ_{46}	—	February 29, 2000	Socorro	LINEAR	AGN	2.0 km	MPC · JPL
203043	2000 DR_{48}	—	February 29, 2000	Socorro	LINEAR	·	2.7 km	MPC · JPL
203044	2000 DG_{113}	—	February 26, 2000	Kitt Peak	Spacewatch	AGN	1.8 km	MPC · JPL
203045	2000 DW_{113}	—	February 27, 2000	Kitt Peak	Spacewatch	·	2.0 km	MPC · JPL
203046	2000 EC_{45}	—	March 9, 2000	Socorro	LINEAR	·	3.6 km	MPC · JPL
203047	2000 EC_{52}	—	March 3, 2000	Kitt Peak	Spacewatch	·	2.1 km	MPC · JPL
203048	2000 EP_{109}	—	March 8, 2000	Haleakala	NEAT	·	3.6 km	MPC · JPL
203049	2000 EO_{113}	—	March 9, 2000	Kitt Peak	Spacewatch	TEL	2.0 km	MPC · JPL
203050	2000 EN_{125}	—	March 11, 2000	Anderson Mesa	LONEOS	·	3.2 km	MPC · JPL
203051	2000 ER_{193}	—	March 3, 2000	Socorro	LINEAR	·	820 m	MPC · JPL
203052	2000 FB_{20}	—	March 29, 2000	Socorro	LINEAR	EUN	2.1 km	MPC · JPL
203053	2000 FH_{51}	—	March 29, 2000	Kitt Peak	Spacewatch	THM	2.9 km	MPC · JPL
203054	2000 GA_{16}	—	April 5, 2000	Socorro	LINEAR	·	1.4 km	MPC · JPL
203055	2000 GH_{24}	—	April 5, 2000	Socorro	LINEAR	·	840 m	MPC · JPL
203056	2000 GA_{26}	—	April 5, 2000	Socorro	LINEAR	·	980 m	MPC · JPL
203057	2000 GP_{121}	—	April 6, 2000	Kitt Peak	Spacewatch	·	2.5 km	MPC · JPL
203058	2000 GO_{180}	—	April 6, 2000	Socorro	LINEAR	·	2.7 km	MPC · JPL
203059	2000 HO_{32}	—	April 29, 2000	Socorro	LINEAR	·	980 m	MPC · JPL
203060	2000 HK_{67}	—	April 27, 2000	Kitt Peak	Spacewatch	·	3.4 km	MPC · JPL
203061	2000 JP_{68}	—	May 9, 2000	Kitt Peak	Spacewatch	THM	2.9 km	MPC · JPL
203062	2000 KF_{3}	—	May 26, 2000	Kitt Peak	Spacewatch	·	2.8 km	MPC · JPL
203063	2000 KM_{54}	—	May 27, 2000	Anderson Mesa	LONEOS	·	3.4 km	MPC · JPL
203064	2000 NH_{20}	—	July 6, 2000	Kitt Peak	Spacewatch	·	2.6 km	MPC · JPL
203065	2000 OR_{21}	—	July 30, 2000	Socorro	LINEAR	PHO	1.7 km	MPC · JPL
203066	2000 PD_{19}	—	August 1, 2000	Socorro	LINEAR	·	2.5 km	MPC · JPL
203067	2000 PE_{22}	—	August 1, 2000	Socorro	LINEAR	·	2.0 km	MPC · JPL
203068	2000 PN_{32}	—	August 2, 2000	Socorro	LINEAR	·	3.4 km	MPC · JPL
203069	2000 QS_{12}	—	August 24, 2000	Socorro	LINEAR	MAS	1.1 km	MPC · JPL
203070	2000 QQ_{21}	—	August 24, 2000	Socorro	LINEAR	·	1.3 km	MPC · JPL
203071	2000 QG_{27}	—	August 24, 2000	Socorro	LINEAR	NYS	1.6 km	MPC · JPL
203072	2000 QC_{39}	—	August 24, 2000	Socorro	LINEAR	·	1.7 km	MPC · JPL
203073	2000 QM_{39}	—	August 24, 2000	Socorro	LINEAR	·	1.2 km	MPC · JPL
203074	2000 QT_{43}	—	August 24, 2000	Socorro	LINEAR	MAS	1.1 km	MPC · JPL
203075	2000 QP_{46}	—	August 24, 2000	Socorro	LINEAR	MAS	1.1 km	MPC · JPL
203076	2000 QU_{49}	—	August 24, 2000	Socorro	LINEAR	MAS	1.0 km	MPC · JPL
203077	2000 QH_{57}	—	August 26, 2000	Socorro	LINEAR	·	1.5 km	MPC · JPL
203078	2000 QR_{59}	—	August 26, 2000	Socorro	LINEAR	NYS	1.5 km	MPC · JPL
203079	2000 QE_{82}	—	August 24, 2000	Socorro	LINEAR	NYS	1.6 km	MPC · JPL
203080	2000 QF_{85}	—	August 25, 2000	Socorro	LINEAR	V	1.5 km	MPC · JPL
203081	2000 QG_{86}	—	August 25, 2000	Socorro	LINEAR	·	1.6 km	MPC · JPL
203082	2000 QN_{86}	—	August 25, 2000	Socorro	LINEAR	V	1.2 km	MPC · JPL
203083	2000 QT_{95}	—	August 26, 2000	Socorro	LINEAR	·	1.6 km	MPC · JPL
203084	2000 QN_{97}	—	August 28, 2000	Socorro	LINEAR	PHO	1.3 km	MPC · JPL
203085	2000 QT_{100}	—	August 28, 2000	Socorro	LINEAR	·	2.2 km	MPC · JPL
203086	2000 QX_{103}	—	August 28, 2000	Socorro	LINEAR	·	1.8 km	MPC · JPL
203087	2000 QD_{123}	—	August 25, 2000	Socorro	LINEAR	·	2.4 km	MPC · JPL
203088	2000 QD_{166}	—	August 31, 2000	Socorro	LINEAR	V	1.1 km	MPC · JPL
203089	2000 QC_{203}	—	August 29, 2000	Socorro	LINEAR	·	2.1 km	MPC · JPL
203090	2000 QU_{214}	—	August 31, 2000	Socorro	LINEAR	·	2.2 km	MPC · JPL
203091	2000 QV_{215}	—	August 31, 2000	Socorro	LINEAR	NYS	2.0 km	MPC · JPL
203092	2000 QY_{221}	—	August 21, 2000	Anderson Mesa	LONEOS	·	2.3 km	MPC · JPL
203093	2000 RS_{6}	—	September 1, 2000	Socorro	LINEAR	·	2.1 km	MPC · JPL
203094	2000 RU_{16}	—	September 1, 2000	Socorro	LINEAR	V	1.2 km	MPC · JPL
203095	2000 RO_{37}	—	September 3, 2000	Socorro	LINEAR	·	3.0 km	MPC · JPL
203096	2000 RQ_{43}	—	September 3, 2000	Socorro	LINEAR	V	1.3 km	MPC · JPL
203097	2000 RL_{67}	—	September 1, 2000	Socorro	LINEAR	·	2.4 km	MPC · JPL
203098	2000 RY_{84}	—	September 2, 2000	Anderson Mesa	LONEOS	NYS ·	2.2 km	MPC · JPL
203099	2000 RF_{93}	—	September 3, 2000	Socorro	LINEAR	·	2.0 km	MPC · JPL
203100	2000 RP_{93}	—	September 4, 2000	Anderson Mesa	LONEOS	NYS	1.3 km	MPC · JPL

== 203101–203200 ==
back to top

Designation			Discovery			Properties		Ref
Permanent	Provisional	Named after	Date	Site	Discoverer(s)	Category	Diam.	Ref
203101	2000 RN_{95}	—	September 4, 2000	Anderson Mesa	LONEOS	NYS	2.0 km	MPC · JPL
203102	2000 RD_{102}	—	September 5, 2000	Anderson Mesa	LONEOS	·	2.8 km	MPC · JPL
203103	2000 SS_{15}	—	September 23, 2000	Socorro	LINEAR	·	2.6 km	MPC · JPL
203104	2000 SJ_{24}	—	September 25, 2000	Socorro	LINEAR	H	1.1 km	MPC · JPL
203105	2000 SK_{31}	—	September 24, 2000	Socorro	LINEAR	MAS	1.1 km	MPC · JPL
203106	2000 SP_{35}	—	September 24, 2000	Socorro	LINEAR	·	2.0 km	MPC · JPL
203107	2000 ST_{38}	—	September 24, 2000	Socorro	LINEAR	·	2.3 km	MPC · JPL
203108	2000 SD_{115}	—	September 24, 2000	Socorro	LINEAR	NYS	1.9 km	MPC · JPL
203109	2000 SX_{115}	—	September 24, 2000	Socorro	LINEAR	·	1.8 km	MPC · JPL
203110	2000 SE_{141}	—	September 23, 2000	Socorro	LINEAR	·	1.6 km	MPC · JPL
203111	2000 SR_{143}	—	September 24, 2000	Socorro	LINEAR	EUN	1.6 km	MPC · JPL
203112	2000 SN_{166}	—	September 23, 2000	Socorro	LINEAR	V	1.0 km	MPC · JPL
203113	2000 SF_{181}	—	September 19, 2000	Haleakala	NEAT	·	2.1 km	MPC · JPL
203114	2000 SK_{195}	—	September 24, 2000	Socorro	LINEAR	·	1.8 km	MPC · JPL
203115	2000 SH_{196}	—	September 24, 2000	Socorro	LINEAR	·	1.7 km	MPC · JPL
203116	2000 SP_{207}	—	September 24, 2000	Socorro	LINEAR	·	1.5 km	MPC · JPL
203117	2000 SN_{218}	—	September 26, 2000	Socorro	LINEAR	·	1.9 km	MPC · JPL
203118	2000 SP_{221}	—	September 26, 2000	Socorro	LINEAR	·	2.7 km	MPC · JPL
203119	2000 SJ_{226}	—	September 27, 2000	Socorro	LINEAR	·	2.4 km	MPC · JPL
203120	2000 SK_{226}	—	September 27, 2000	Socorro	LINEAR	·	2.1 km	MPC · JPL
203121	2000 SV_{228}	—	September 28, 2000	Socorro	LINEAR	NYS	1.8 km	MPC · JPL
203122	2000 SY_{229}	—	September 28, 2000	Socorro	LINEAR	V	1.1 km	MPC · JPL
203123	2000 SH_{231}	—	September 30, 2000	Socorro	LINEAR	·	1.9 km	MPC · JPL
203124	2000 SV_{233}	—	September 21, 2000	Socorro	LINEAR	·	2.1 km	MPC · JPL
203125	2000 SN_{237}	—	September 25, 2000	Socorro	LINEAR	·	2.1 km	MPC · JPL
203126	2000 SV_{243}	—	September 24, 2000	Socorro	LINEAR	NYS	1.8 km	MPC · JPL
203127	2000 SZ_{246}	—	September 24, 2000	Socorro	LINEAR	·	1.6 km	MPC · JPL
203128	2000 SE_{249}	—	September 24, 2000	Socorro	LINEAR	T_{j} (2.98) · 3:2	7.7 km	MPC · JPL
203129	2000 SA_{252}	—	September 24, 2000	Socorro	LINEAR	PHO	1.6 km	MPC · JPL
203130	2000 SO_{258}	—	September 24, 2000	Socorro	LINEAR	·	1.6 km	MPC · JPL
203131	2000 SJ_{277}	—	September 30, 2000	Socorro	LINEAR	·	3.1 km	MPC · JPL
203132	2000 SG_{352}	—	September 30, 2000	Anderson Mesa	LONEOS	·	1.6 km	MPC · JPL
203133	2000 SO_{369}	—	September 25, 2000	Anderson Mesa	LONEOS	·	2.0 km	MPC · JPL
203134	2000 TK_{2}	—	October 2, 2000	Anza	M. Collins, Sipe, R.	·	1.6 km	MPC · JPL
203135	2000 TM_{6}	—	October 1, 2000	Socorro	LINEAR	MAS	1.1 km	MPC · JPL
203136	2000 TT_{13}	—	October 1, 2000	Socorro	LINEAR	NYS	1.5 km	MPC · JPL
203137	2000 TY_{28}	—	October 1, 2000	Socorro	LINEAR	MAS	780 m	MPC · JPL
203138	2000 TH_{58}	—	October 2, 2000	Socorro	LINEAR	·	3.2 km	MPC · JPL
203139	2000 UP_{20}	—	October 24, 2000	Socorro	LINEAR	MAS	1.1 km	MPC · JPL
203140	2000 UT_{21}	—	October 24, 2000	Socorro	LINEAR	·	1.9 km	MPC · JPL
203141	2000 UV_{41}	—	October 24, 2000	Socorro	LINEAR	SUL	3.3 km	MPC · JPL
203142	2000 UV_{57}	—	October 25, 2000	Socorro	LINEAR	·	1.6 km	MPC · JPL
203143	2000 UW_{57}	—	October 25, 2000	Socorro	LINEAR	NYS	2.2 km	MPC · JPL
203144	2000 UO_{61}	—	October 25, 2000	Socorro	LINEAR	EUN	1.5 km	MPC · JPL
203145	2000 UZ_{84}	—	October 31, 2000	Socorro	LINEAR	·	1.5 km	MPC · JPL
203146	2000 VE_{4}	—	November 1, 2000	Socorro	LINEAR	MAS	1.2 km	MPC · JPL
203147	2000 VP_{4}	—	November 1, 2000	Socorro	LINEAR	NYS	1.4 km	MPC · JPL
203148	2000 VY_{38}	—	November 3, 2000	Socorro	LINEAR	H	740 m	MPC · JPL
203149	2000 VP_{48}	—	November 2, 2000	Socorro	LINEAR	NYS	2.0 km	MPC · JPL
203150	2000 WA_{10}	—	November 22, 2000	Kitt Peak	Spacewatch	·	3.6 km	MPC · JPL
203151	2000 WV_{10}	—	November 22, 2000	Kitt Peak	Spacewatch	EUN	2.7 km	MPC · JPL
203152	2000 WH_{15}	—	November 20, 2000	Socorro	LINEAR	·	2.3 km	MPC · JPL
203153	2000 WL_{18}	—	November 21, 2000	Socorro	LINEAR	·	1.9 km	MPC · JPL
203154	2000 WT_{31}	—	November 20, 2000	Socorro	LINEAR	·	2.8 km	MPC · JPL
203155	2000 WU_{101}	—	November 26, 2000	Socorro	LINEAR	(5)	1.7 km	MPC · JPL
203156	2000 WK_{138}	—	November 21, 2000	Socorro	LINEAR	3:2 · SHU	7.1 km	MPC · JPL
203157	2000 WC_{140}	—	November 21, 2000	Socorro	LINEAR	3:2 · SHU	7.2 km	MPC · JPL
203158	2000 WF_{142}	—	November 20, 2000	Anderson Mesa	LONEOS	slow	2.6 km	MPC · JPL
203159	2000 WQ_{144}	—	November 21, 2000	Socorro	LINEAR	3:2 · SHU	7.8 km	MPC · JPL
203160	2000 WB_{159}	—	November 28, 2000	Kitt Peak	Spacewatch	·	1.6 km	MPC · JPL
203161	2000 WO_{167}	—	November 24, 2000	Anderson Mesa	LONEOS	·	2.9 km	MPC · JPL
203162	2000 WA_{180}	—	November 27, 2000	Socorro	LINEAR	·	1.3 km	MPC · JPL
203163	2000 XU_{5}	—	December 1, 2000	Socorro	LINEAR	·	2.3 km	MPC · JPL
203164	2000 XY_{15}	—	December 1, 2000	Socorro	LINEAR	·	2.4 km	MPC · JPL
203165	2000 XP_{22}	—	December 4, 2000	Socorro	LINEAR	·	2.1 km	MPC · JPL
203166	2000 XB_{39}	—	December 5, 2000	Socorro	LINEAR	H	2.2 km	MPC · JPL
203167	2000 XT_{44}	—	December 7, 2000	Socorro	LINEAR	BAR	1.9 km	MPC · JPL
203168	2000 XL_{45}	—	December 7, 2000	Socorro	LINEAR	H	1 km	MPC · JPL
203169	2000 YF_{26}	—	December 23, 2000	Socorro	LINEAR	·	2.2 km	MPC · JPL
203170	2000 YH_{42}	—	December 30, 2000	Socorro	LINEAR	·	2.4 km	MPC · JPL
203171	2000 YU_{48}	—	December 30, 2000	Socorro	LINEAR	·	1.9 km	MPC · JPL
203172	2000 YY_{94}	—	December 30, 2000	Socorro	LINEAR	·	1.9 km	MPC · JPL
203173	2000 YL_{98}	—	December 30, 2000	Socorro	LINEAR	fast	1.6 km	MPC · JPL
203174	2000 YK_{107}	—	December 30, 2000	Socorro	LINEAR	·	3.5 km	MPC · JPL
203175	2000 YH_{110}	—	December 30, 2000	Socorro	LINEAR	KON	4.2 km	MPC · JPL
203176	2000 YB_{134}	—	December 31, 2000	Haleakala	NEAT	PHO	4.8 km	MPC · JPL
203177	2001 AM_{9}	—	January 2, 2001	Socorro	LINEAR	·	2.5 km	MPC · JPL
203178	2001 AH_{36}	—	January 5, 2001	Socorro	LINEAR	·	2.4 km	MPC · JPL
203179	2001 BK_{10}	—	January 18, 2001	Socorro	LINEAR	H	750 m	MPC · JPL
203180	2001 BU_{11}	—	January 19, 2001	Kitt Peak	Spacewatch	·	2.0 km	MPC · JPL
203181	2001 BJ_{24}	—	January 20, 2001	Socorro	LINEAR	·	2.2 km	MPC · JPL
203182	2001 BN_{25}	—	January 20, 2001	Socorro	LINEAR	·	2.2 km	MPC · JPL
203183	2001 BS_{25}	—	January 20, 2001	Socorro	LINEAR	·	1.8 km	MPC · JPL
203184	2001 BZ_{56}	—	January 19, 2001	Kitt Peak	Spacewatch	MAR	1.7 km	MPC · JPL
203185	2001 BD_{66}	—	January 26, 2001	Socorro	LINEAR	·	4.1 km	MPC · JPL
203186	2001 BA_{70}	—	January 31, 2001	Socorro	LINEAR	H	1.3 km	MPC · JPL
203187	2001 CK	—	February 1, 2001	Socorro	LINEAR	H	800 m	MPC · JPL
203188	2001 CQ_{5}	—	February 1, 2001	Socorro	LINEAR	·	2.3 km	MPC · JPL
203189	2001 CF_{6}	—	February 1, 2001	Socorro	LINEAR	EUN	2.0 km	MPC · JPL
203190	2001 CT_{12}	—	February 1, 2001	Socorro	LINEAR	·	1.8 km	MPC · JPL
203191	2001 CV_{15}	—	February 1, 2001	Socorro	LINEAR	(5)	1.4 km	MPC · JPL
203192	2001 CE_{30}	—	February 2, 2001	Anderson Mesa	LONEOS	·	2.2 km	MPC · JPL
203193	2001 CC_{35}	—	February 13, 2001	Socorro	LINEAR	·	3.2 km	MPC · JPL
203194	2001 CT_{37}	—	February 15, 2001	Socorro	LINEAR	H	880 m	MPC · JPL
203195	2001 CH_{42}	—	February 14, 2001	Bergisch Gladbach	W. Bickel	·	1.9 km	MPC · JPL
203196	2001 CJ_{42}	—	February 15, 2001	Socorro	LINEAR	H	930 m	MPC · JPL
203197	2001 DG_{1}	—	February 16, 2001	Kitt Peak	Spacewatch	(5)	1.9 km	MPC · JPL
203198	2001 DV_{1}	—	February 16, 2001	Kitt Peak	Spacewatch	·	1.3 km	MPC · JPL
203199	2001 DT_{7}	—	February 16, 2001	Črni Vrh	Matičič, S.	H	830 m	MPC · JPL
203200	2001 DP_{17}	—	February 16, 2001	Socorro	LINEAR	·	2.0 km	MPC · JPL

== 203201–203300 ==
back to top

Designation			Discovery			Properties		Ref
Permanent	Provisional	Named after	Date	Site	Discoverer(s)	Category	Diam.	Ref
203201	2001 DQ_{32}	—	February 17, 2001	Socorro	LINEAR	(5)	1.8 km	MPC · JPL
203202	2001 DW_{38}	—	February 19, 2001	Socorro	LINEAR	EUN	2.0 km	MPC · JPL
203203	2001 DJ_{40}	—	February 19, 2001	Socorro	LINEAR	·	2.0 km	MPC · JPL
203204	2001 DZ_{49}	—	February 16, 2001	Socorro	LINEAR	·	2.5 km	MPC · JPL
203205	2001 DE_{60}	—	February 19, 2001	Socorro	LINEAR	·	2.7 km	MPC · JPL
203206	2001 DD_{65}	—	February 19, 2001	Socorro	LINEAR	·	2.4 km	MPC · JPL
203207	2001 DE_{70}	—	February 19, 2001	Socorro	LINEAR	·	2.0 km	MPC · JPL
203208	2001 DE_{75}	—	February 20, 2001	Socorro	LINEAR	(5)	1.7 km	MPC · JPL
203209	2001 DG_{100}	—	February 17, 2001	Haleakala	NEAT	·	2.6 km	MPC · JPL
203210	2001 DR_{100}	—	February 16, 2001	Socorro	LINEAR	L4	20 km	MPC · JPL
203211	2001 DP_{110}	—	February 21, 2001	Apache Point	SDSS	·	2.7 km	MPC · JPL
203212	2001 ET_{9}	—	March 2, 2001	Anderson Mesa	LONEOS	·	1.8 km	MPC · JPL
203213	2001 EP_{11}	—	March 2, 2001	Haleakala	NEAT	·	4.5 km	MPC · JPL
203214	2001 EV_{12}	—	March 13, 2001	Socorro	LINEAR	·	4.0 km	MPC · JPL
203215	2001 EU_{24}	—	March 15, 2001	Socorro	LINEAR	EUN	2.9 km	MPC · JPL
203216	2001 FY_{7}	—	March 16, 2001	Socorro	LINEAR	·	2.5 km	MPC · JPL
203217	2001 FX_{9}	—	March 21, 2001	Kvistaberg	Uppsala-DLR Asteroid Survey	AMO	630 m	MPC · JPL
203218	2001 FM_{60}	—	March 19, 2001	Socorro	LINEAR	·	1.7 km	MPC · JPL
203219	2001 FE_{61}	—	March 19, 2001	Socorro	LINEAR	·	1.7 km	MPC · JPL
203220	2001 FU_{66}	—	March 19, 2001	Socorro	LINEAR	·	2.2 km	MPC · JPL
203221	2001 FJ_{73}	—	March 19, 2001	Socorro	LINEAR	·	2.5 km	MPC · JPL
203222	2001 FH_{81}	—	March 23, 2001	Socorro	LINEAR	·	3.8 km	MPC · JPL
203223	2001 FC_{82}	—	March 23, 2001	Socorro	LINEAR	·	2.9 km	MPC · JPL
203224	2001 FU_{91}	—	March 16, 2001	Socorro	LINEAR	·	2.0 km	MPC · JPL
203225	2001 FC_{97}	—	March 16, 2001	Socorro	LINEAR	·	4.2 km	MPC · JPL
203226	2001 FQ_{99}	—	March 16, 2001	Socorro	LINEAR	·	2.2 km	MPC · JPL
203227	2001 FW_{122}	—	March 23, 2001	Anderson Mesa	LONEOS	·	1.6 km	MPC · JPL
203228	2001 FK_{132}	—	March 20, 2001	Haleakala	NEAT	·	2.1 km	MPC · JPL
203229	2001 FU_{151}	—	March 24, 2001	Haleakala	NEAT	EUN	2.1 km	MPC · JPL
203230	2001 FL_{167}	—	March 19, 2001	Socorro	LINEAR	·	3.1 km	MPC · JPL
203231	2001 FT_{172}	—	March 25, 2001	Anderson Mesa	LONEOS	·	3.4 km	MPC · JPL
203232	2001 GM_{11}	—	April 15, 2001	Anderson Mesa	LONEOS	BAR	2.4 km	MPC · JPL
203233	2001 HB_{9}	—	April 16, 2001	Socorro	LINEAR	·	1.2 km	MPC · JPL
203234	2001 HP_{18}	—	April 22, 2001	Haleakala	NEAT	·	2.9 km	MPC · JPL
203235	2001 HV_{53}	—	April 24, 2001	Anderson Mesa	LONEOS	EUN	2.2 km	MPC · JPL
203236	2001 HH_{60}	—	April 24, 2001	Anderson Mesa	LONEOS	·	4.9 km	MPC · JPL
203237	2001 JC_{10}	—	May 15, 2001	Haleakala	NEAT	·	3.7 km	MPC · JPL
203238	2001 KR_{40}	—	May 23, 2001	Socorro	LINEAR	·	4.2 km	MPC · JPL
203239	2001 MZ_{11}	—	June 21, 2001	Palomar	NEAT	HYG	6.3 km	MPC · JPL
203240	2001 NV_{15}	—	July 14, 2001	Palomar	NEAT	·	910 m	MPC · JPL
203241	2001 OQ_{17}	—	July 17, 2001	Palomar	NEAT	·	2.5 km	MPC · JPL
203242	2001 OA_{36}	—	July 24, 2001	Prescott	P. G. Comba	·	3.8 km	MPC · JPL
203243	2001 OP_{64}	—	July 27, 2001	Palomar	NEAT	HYG	5.5 km	MPC · JPL
203244	2001 ON_{100}	—	July 27, 2001	Anderson Mesa	LONEOS	·	1.0 km	MPC · JPL
203245	2001 OU_{106}	—	July 29, 2001	Socorro	LINEAR	LIX	8.8 km	MPC · JPL
203246	2001 OT_{110}	—	July 27, 2001	Haleakala	NEAT	·	1.2 km	MPC · JPL
203247	2001 QK_{6}	—	August 16, 2001	Socorro	LINEAR	TIR	4.8 km	MPC · JPL
203248	2001 QP_{15}	—	August 16, 2001	Socorro	LINEAR	·	1.9 km	MPC · JPL
203249	2001 QU_{34}	—	August 16, 2001	Socorro	LINEAR	·	3.2 km	MPC · JPL
203250	2001 QF_{89}	—	August 22, 2001	Desert Eagle	W. K. Y. Yeung	·	1.0 km	MPC · JPL
203251	2001 QN_{96}	—	August 16, 2001	Socorro	LINEAR	·	1.3 km	MPC · JPL
203252	2001 QQ_{99}	—	August 16, 2001	Socorro	LINEAR	·	890 m	MPC · JPL
203253	2001 QU_{116}	—	August 17, 2001	Socorro	LINEAR	·	1.1 km	MPC · JPL
203254	2001 QG_{129}	—	August 20, 2001	Socorro	LINEAR	·	6.5 km	MPC · JPL
203255	2001 QD_{136}	—	August 22, 2001	Socorro	LINEAR	·	1.2 km	MPC · JPL
203256	2001 QW_{149}	—	August 25, 2001	Haleakala	NEAT	·	4.9 km	MPC · JPL
203257	2001 QC_{153}	—	August 27, 2001	Ondřejov	P. Kušnirák	·	830 m	MPC · JPL
203258	2001 QG_{163}	—	August 23, 2001	Anderson Mesa	LONEOS	·	750 m	MPC · JPL
203259	2001 QE_{165}	—	August 24, 2001	Haleakala	NEAT	·	2.8 km	MPC · JPL
203260	2001 QW_{186}	—	August 21, 2001	Kitt Peak	Spacewatch	·	810 m	MPC · JPL
203261	2001 QA_{187}	—	August 21, 2001	Palomar	NEAT	CYB	8.1 km	MPC · JPL
203262	2001 QD_{240}	—	August 24, 2001	Socorro	LINEAR	·	3.2 km	MPC · JPL
203263	2001 QS_{246}	—	August 24, 2001	Socorro	LINEAR	·	5.9 km	MPC · JPL
203264	2001 QQ_{249}	—	August 24, 2001	Goodricke-Pigott	R. A. Tucker	·	6.8 km	MPC · JPL
203265	2001 QB_{258}	—	August 25, 2001	Socorro	LINEAR	·	1.8 km	MPC · JPL
203266	2001 QF_{268}	—	August 20, 2001	Socorro	LINEAR	HYG	4.3 km	MPC · JPL
203267	2001 QJ_{275}	—	August 19, 2001	Socorro	LINEAR	·	3.1 km	MPC · JPL
203268	2001 QW_{278}	—	August 19, 2001	Socorro	LINEAR	·	880 m	MPC · JPL
203269	2001 QP_{280}	—	August 19, 2001	Socorro	LINEAR	·	1.1 km	MPC · JPL
203270	2001 QX_{284}	—	August 23, 2001	Haleakala	NEAT	HYG	5.2 km	MPC · JPL
203271	2001 RU_{5}	—	September 9, 2001	Desert Eagle	W. K. Y. Yeung	·	5.3 km	MPC · JPL
203272	2001 RL_{6}	—	September 10, 2001	Desert Eagle	W. K. Y. Yeung	·	1.0 km	MPC · JPL
203273	2001 RL_{15}	—	September 10, 2001	Socorro	LINEAR	·	4.9 km	MPC · JPL
203274	2001 RN_{22}	—	September 7, 2001	Socorro	LINEAR	·	670 m	MPC · JPL
203275	2001 RK_{35}	—	September 8, 2001	Socorro	LINEAR	·	4.6 km	MPC · JPL
203276	2001 RM_{48}	—	September 10, 2001	Socorro	LINEAR	·	1.3 km	MPC · JPL
203277	2001 RQ_{55}	—	September 12, 2001	Socorro	LINEAR	·	3.1 km	MPC · JPL
203278	2001 RH_{70}	—	September 10, 2001	Socorro	LINEAR	·	1 km	MPC · JPL
203279	2001 RF_{74}	—	September 10, 2001	Socorro	LINEAR	(2076)	1.2 km	MPC · JPL
203280	2001 RO_{94}	—	September 11, 2001	Anderson Mesa	LONEOS	·	960 m	MPC · JPL
203281	2001 RQ_{116}	—	September 12, 2001	Socorro	LINEAR	·	3.2 km	MPC · JPL
203282	2001 RG_{117}	—	September 12, 2001	Socorro	LINEAR	·	3.1 km	MPC · JPL
203283	2001 RL_{145}	—	September 8, 2001	Socorro	LINEAR	·	3.5 km	MPC · JPL
203284	2001 RY_{146}	—	September 9, 2001	Anderson Mesa	LONEOS	(6355)	9.1 km	MPC · JPL
203285	2001 RU_{152}	—	September 11, 2001	Anderson Mesa	LONEOS	·	990 m	MPC · JPL
203286	2001 SH_{2}	—	September 17, 2001	Desert Eagle	W. K. Y. Yeung	·	1.0 km	MPC · JPL
203287	2001 SY_{28}	—	September 16, 2001	Socorro	LINEAR	·	680 m	MPC · JPL
203288	2001 SX_{42}	—	September 16, 2001	Socorro	LINEAR	·	1.2 km	MPC · JPL
203289	2001 SN_{47}	—	September 16, 2001	Socorro	LINEAR	·	1.0 km	MPC · JPL
203290	2001 SJ_{66}	—	September 17, 2001	Socorro	LINEAR	·	870 m	MPC · JPL
203291	2001 SJ_{72}	—	September 17, 2001	Socorro	LINEAR	·	4.1 km	MPC · JPL
203292	2001 SR_{75}	—	September 19, 2001	Anderson Mesa	LONEOS	·	990 m	MPC · JPL
203293	2001 SU_{76}	—	September 16, 2001	Socorro	LINEAR	·	3.8 km	MPC · JPL
203294	2001 SM_{91}	—	September 20, 2001	Socorro	LINEAR	·	3.6 km	MPC · JPL
203295	2001 SM_{97}	—	September 20, 2001	Socorro	LINEAR	·	930 m	MPC · JPL
203296	2001 SO_{127}	—	September 16, 2001	Socorro	LINEAR	·	4.3 km	MPC · JPL
203297	2001 SY_{141}	—	September 16, 2001	Socorro	LINEAR	·	4.1 km	MPC · JPL
203298	2001 SK_{152}	—	September 17, 2001	Socorro	LINEAR	·	1.2 km	MPC · JPL
203299	2001 SS_{152}	—	September 17, 2001	Socorro	LINEAR	·	1.2 km	MPC · JPL
203300	2001 SR_{186}	—	September 19, 2001	Socorro	LINEAR	·	1.2 km	MPC · JPL

== 203301–203400 ==
back to top

Designation			Discovery			Properties		Ref
Permanent	Provisional	Named after	Date	Site	Discoverer(s)	Category	Diam.	Ref
203301	2001 SZ_{235}	—	September 19, 2001	Socorro	LINEAR	·	930 m	MPC · JPL
203302	2001 SA_{239}	—	September 19, 2001	Socorro	LINEAR	·	1.0 km	MPC · JPL
203303	2001 SC_{241}	—	September 19, 2001	Socorro	LINEAR	·	810 m	MPC · JPL
203304	2001 SF_{265}	—	September 25, 2001	Desert Eagle	W. K. Y. Yeung	·	1.1 km	MPC · JPL
203305	2001 SO_{273}	—	September 18, 2001	Kitt Peak	Spacewatch	·	4.2 km	MPC · JPL
203306	2001 ST_{291}	—	September 17, 2001	Anderson Mesa	LONEOS	·	1.3 km	MPC · JPL
203307	2001 SP_{319}	—	September 21, 2001	Socorro	LINEAR	·	910 m	MPC · JPL
203308	2001 SY_{321}	—	September 25, 2001	Socorro	LINEAR	EOS	3.5 km	MPC · JPL
203309	2001 SO_{325}	—	September 17, 2001	Kitt Peak	Spacewatch	·	3.7 km	MPC · JPL
203310	2001 TW_{24}	—	October 14, 2001	Socorro	LINEAR	·	840 m	MPC · JPL
203311	2001 TZ_{30}	—	October 14, 2001	Socorro	LINEAR	·	1.2 km	MPC · JPL
203312	2001 TW_{34}	—	October 14, 2001	Socorro	LINEAR	·	1.4 km	MPC · JPL
203313	2001 TM_{51}	—	October 13, 2001	Socorro	LINEAR	·	1.1 km	MPC · JPL
203314	2001 TN_{58}	—	October 13, 2001	Socorro	LINEAR	·	780 m	MPC · JPL
203315	2001 TQ_{60}	—	October 13, 2001	Socorro	LINEAR	·	960 m	MPC · JPL
203316	2001 TB_{63}	—	October 13, 2001	Socorro	LINEAR	·	1.1 km	MPC · JPL
203317	2001 TM_{65}	—	October 13, 2001	Socorro	LINEAR	·	1.1 km	MPC · JPL
203318	2001 TN_{66}	—	October 13, 2001	Socorro	LINEAR	·	940 m	MPC · JPL
203319	2001 TH_{68}	—	October 13, 2001	Socorro	LINEAR	·	1.7 km	MPC · JPL
203320	2001 TJ_{93}	—	October 14, 2001	Socorro	LINEAR	·	1.1 km	MPC · JPL
203321	2001 TU_{109}	—	October 14, 2001	Socorro	LINEAR	·	950 m	MPC · JPL
203322	2001 TL_{110}	—	October 14, 2001	Socorro	LINEAR	·	1.1 km	MPC · JPL
203323	2001 TM_{111}	—	October 14, 2001	Socorro	LINEAR	·	1.4 km	MPC · JPL
203324	2001 TM_{113}	—	October 14, 2001	Socorro	LINEAR	·	1.1 km	MPC · JPL
203325	2001 TC_{148}	—	October 10, 2001	Palomar	NEAT	·	900 m	MPC · JPL
203326	2001 TQ_{151}	—	October 10, 2001	Palomar	NEAT	·	1.0 km	MPC · JPL
203327	2001 TU_{173}	—	October 14, 2001	Socorro	LINEAR	·	990 m	MPC · JPL
203328	2001 TS_{175}	—	October 14, 2001	Socorro	LINEAR	·	1.0 km	MPC · JPL
203329	2001 TH_{190}	—	October 14, 2001	Socorro	LINEAR	·	2.2 km	MPC · JPL
203330	2001 TH_{193}	—	October 14, 2001	Socorro	LINEAR	·	1.5 km	MPC · JPL
203331	2001 TV_{198}	—	October 11, 2001	Socorro	LINEAR	·	1 km	MPC · JPL
203332	2001 TK_{208}	—	October 11, 2001	Kitt Peak	Spacewatch	·	1.2 km	MPC · JPL
203333	2001 TU_{212}	—	October 13, 2001	Palomar	NEAT	LIX	6.0 km	MPC · JPL
203334	2001 TC_{226}	—	October 14, 2001	Palomar	NEAT	·	7.1 km	MPC · JPL
203335	2001 TW_{228}	—	October 15, 2001	Socorro	LINEAR	·	5.3 km	MPC · JPL
203336	2001 UG_{6}	—	October 21, 2001	Palomar	NEAT	·	890 m	MPC · JPL
203337	2001 UT_{15}	—	October 25, 2001	Desert Eagle	W. K. Y. Yeung	·	1.2 km	MPC · JPL
203338	2001 UB_{41}	—	October 17, 2001	Socorro	LINEAR	·	900 m	MPC · JPL
203339	2001 UT_{60}	—	October 17, 2001	Socorro	LINEAR	CYB	6.4 km	MPC · JPL
203340	2001 UU_{66}	—	October 19, 2001	Socorro	LINEAR	·	1.2 km	MPC · JPL
203341	2001 UV_{75}	—	October 17, 2001	Socorro	LINEAR	·	1.4 km	MPC · JPL
203342	2001 UJ_{81}	—	October 20, 2001	Socorro	LINEAR	NYS	1.2 km	MPC · JPL
203343	2001 UG_{83}	—	October 20, 2001	Socorro	LINEAR	·	1.4 km	MPC · JPL
203344	2001 UL_{103}	—	October 20, 2001	Socorro	LINEAR	·	760 m	MPC · JPL
203345	2001 UP_{104}	—	October 20, 2001	Socorro	LINEAR	·	1.1 km	MPC · JPL
203346	2001 UB_{136}	—	October 22, 2001	Socorro	LINEAR	NYS	1.4 km	MPC · JPL
203347	2001 UV_{148}	—	October 23, 2001	Socorro	LINEAR	·	1.0 km	MPC · JPL
203348	2001 UG_{155}	—	October 23, 2001	Socorro	LINEAR	·	5.7 km	MPC · JPL
203349	2001 UO_{200}	—	October 19, 2001	Palomar	NEAT	·	1.7 km	MPC · JPL
203350	2001 UX_{204}	—	October 19, 2001	Palomar	NEAT	·	1.1 km	MPC · JPL
203351	2001 VW_{29}	—	November 9, 2001	Socorro	LINEAR	·	2.9 km	MPC · JPL
203352	2001 VK_{53}	—	November 10, 2001	Socorro	LINEAR	·	1.3 km	MPC · JPL
203353	2001 VF_{54}	—	November 10, 2001	Socorro	LINEAR	·	1.4 km	MPC · JPL
203354	2001 VG_{58}	—	November 10, 2001	Socorro	LINEAR	·	1.0 km	MPC · JPL
203355	2001 VT_{59}	—	November 10, 2001	Socorro	LINEAR	·	1 km	MPC · JPL
203356	2001 VQ_{63}	—	November 10, 2001	Socorro	LINEAR	V	870 m	MPC · JPL
203357	2001 VZ_{63}	—	November 10, 2001	Socorro	LINEAR	·	1.2 km	MPC · JPL
203358	2001 VS_{64}	—	November 10, 2001	Socorro	LINEAR	·	1.2 km	MPC · JPL
203359	2001 VL_{88}	—	November 15, 2001	Palomar	NEAT	·	1.1 km	MPC · JPL
203360	2001 VA_{102}	—	November 12, 2001	Socorro	LINEAR	·	890 m	MPC · JPL
203361	2001 VT_{102}	—	November 12, 2001	Socorro	LINEAR	·	790 m	MPC · JPL
203362	2001 VB_{113}	—	November 12, 2001	Socorro	LINEAR	·	1.6 km	MPC · JPL
203363	2001 VD_{119}	—	November 12, 2001	Socorro	LINEAR	·	1.1 km	MPC · JPL
203364	2001 VQ_{124}	—	November 9, 2001	Socorro	LINEAR	·	940 m	MPC · JPL
203365	2001 VC_{125}	—	November 11, 2001	Socorro	LINEAR	(2076)	1.3 km	MPC · JPL
203366	2001 VD_{125}	—	November 11, 2001	Socorro	LINEAR	·	1.3 km	MPC · JPL
203367	2001 WO_{5}	—	November 19, 2001	Oizumi	T. Kobayashi	·	1.1 km	MPC · JPL
203368	2001 WW_{5}	—	November 17, 2001	Kitt Peak	Spacewatch	·	980 m	MPC · JPL
203369	2001 WD_{10}	—	November 17, 2001	Socorro	LINEAR	·	1.0 km	MPC · JPL
203370	2001 WY_{35}	—	November 17, 2001	Socorro	LINEAR	·	990 m	MPC · JPL
203371	2001 WB_{45}	—	November 18, 2001	Socorro	LINEAR	PHO	2.6 km	MPC · JPL
203372	2001 WK_{78}	—	November 20, 2001	Socorro	LINEAR	·	1.2 km	MPC · JPL
203373	2001 WD_{101}	—	November 17, 2001	Kitt Peak	Spacewatch	·	740 m	MPC · JPL
203374	2001 XK_{7}	—	December 7, 2001	Socorro	LINEAR	·	960 m	MPC · JPL
203375	2001 XR_{18}	—	December 9, 2001	Socorro	LINEAR	·	1.3 km	MPC · JPL
203376	2001 XC_{20}	—	December 9, 2001	Socorro	LINEAR	·	1.3 km	MPC · JPL
203377	2001 XL_{38}	—	December 9, 2001	Socorro	LINEAR	V	1.0 km	MPC · JPL
203378	2001 XX_{43}	—	December 9, 2001	Socorro	LINEAR	·	1.4 km	MPC · JPL
203379	2001 XD_{61}	—	December 10, 2001	Socorro	LINEAR	·	1.3 km	MPC · JPL
203380	2001 XP_{61}	—	December 10, 2001	Socorro	LINEAR	·	1.1 km	MPC · JPL
203381	2001 XA_{70}	—	December 11, 2001	Socorro	LINEAR	PHO	1.2 km	MPC · JPL
203382	2001 XR_{84}	—	December 11, 2001	Socorro	LINEAR	·	1.1 km	MPC · JPL
203383	2001 XN_{92}	—	December 10, 2001	Socorro	LINEAR	·	1.2 km	MPC · JPL
203384	2001 XA_{93}	—	December 10, 2001	Socorro	LINEAR	·	1.1 km	MPC · JPL
203385	2001 XH_{93}	—	December 10, 2001	Socorro	LINEAR	·	1.1 km	MPC · JPL
203386	2001 XZ_{96}	—	December 10, 2001	Socorro	LINEAR	·	1.3 km	MPC · JPL
203387	2001 XK_{103}	—	December 14, 2001	Socorro	LINEAR	·	1.5 km	MPC · JPL
203388	2001 XX_{104}	—	December 14, 2001	Kitt Peak	Spacewatch	·	1.1 km	MPC · JPL
203389	2001 XQ_{120}	—	December 14, 2001	Socorro	LINEAR	·	910 m	MPC · JPL
203390	2001 XQ_{127}	—	December 14, 2001	Socorro	LINEAR	·	2.0 km	MPC · JPL
203391	2001 XF_{129}	—	December 14, 2001	Socorro	LINEAR	·	1.0 km	MPC · JPL
203392	2001 XL_{134}	—	December 14, 2001	Socorro	LINEAR	·	870 m	MPC · JPL
203393	2001 XB_{139}	—	December 14, 2001	Socorro	LINEAR	·	1.4 km	MPC · JPL
203394	2001 XT_{141}	—	December 14, 2001	Socorro	LINEAR	CYB	5.0 km	MPC · JPL
203395	2001 XW_{142}	—	December 14, 2001	Socorro	LINEAR	·	1.2 km	MPC · JPL
203396	2001 XO_{148}	—	December 14, 2001	Socorro	LINEAR	·	1.0 km	MPC · JPL
203397	2001 XZ_{151}	—	December 14, 2001	Socorro	LINEAR	·	1.1 km	MPC · JPL
203398	2001 XE_{154}	—	December 14, 2001	Socorro	LINEAR	·	1.4 km	MPC · JPL
203399	2001 XP_{155}	—	December 14, 2001	Socorro	LINEAR	·	1.5 km	MPC · JPL
203400	2001 XR_{163}	—	December 14, 2001	Socorro	LINEAR	·	2.3 km	MPC · JPL

== 203401–203500 ==
back to top

Designation			Discovery			Properties		Ref
Permanent	Provisional	Named after	Date	Site	Discoverer(s)	Category	Diam.	Ref
203401	2001 XZ_{166}	—	December 14, 2001	Socorro	LINEAR	·	1.3 km	MPC · JPL
203402	2001 XE_{167}	—	December 14, 2001	Socorro	LINEAR	·	1.3 km	MPC · JPL
203403	2001 XZ_{168}	—	December 14, 2001	Socorro	LINEAR	·	1.8 km	MPC · JPL
203404	2001 XM_{171}	—	December 14, 2001	Socorro	LINEAR	·	1.2 km	MPC · JPL
203405	2001 XY_{172}	—	December 14, 2001	Socorro	LINEAR	·	980 m	MPC · JPL
203406	2001 XW_{177}	—	December 14, 2001	Socorro	LINEAR	·	1.6 km	MPC · JPL
203407	2001 XX_{178}	—	December 14, 2001	Socorro	LINEAR	(2076)	1.3 km	MPC · JPL
203408	2001 XR_{179}	—	December 14, 2001	Socorro	LINEAR	·	1.2 km	MPC · JPL
203409	2001 XX_{182}	—	December 14, 2001	Socorro	LINEAR	·	990 m	MPC · JPL
203410	2001 XW_{185}	—	December 14, 2001	Socorro	LINEAR	·	1.2 km	MPC · JPL
203411	2001 XN_{188}	—	December 14, 2001	Socorro	LINEAR	V	900 m	MPC · JPL
203412	2001 XO_{188}	—	December 14, 2001	Socorro	LINEAR	·	1.3 km	MPC · JPL
203413	2001 XD_{191}	—	December 14, 2001	Socorro	LINEAR	·	1.2 km	MPC · JPL
203414	2001 XJ_{192}	—	December 14, 2001	Socorro	LINEAR	·	1.4 km	MPC · JPL
203415	2001 XR_{192}	—	December 14, 2001	Socorro	LINEAR	·	980 m	MPC · JPL
203416	2001 XJ_{193}	—	December 14, 2001	Socorro	LINEAR	·	1.4 km	MPC · JPL
203417	2001 XK_{194}	—	December 14, 2001	Socorro	LINEAR	V	1.0 km	MPC · JPL
203418	2001 XM_{203}	—	December 11, 2001	Socorro	LINEAR	·	1.0 km	MPC · JPL
203419	2001 XR_{204}	—	December 11, 2001	Socorro	LINEAR	V	900 m	MPC · JPL
203420	2001 XC_{209}	—	December 11, 2001	Socorro	LINEAR	·	1.0 km	MPC · JPL
203421	2001 XJ_{211}	—	December 11, 2001	Socorro	LINEAR	·	1.3 km	MPC · JPL
203422	2001 XG_{225}	—	December 15, 2001	Socorro	LINEAR	·	740 m	MPC · JPL
203423	2001 XU_{232}	—	December 15, 2001	Socorro	LINEAR	·	1.0 km	MPC · JPL
203424	2001 XG_{239}	—	December 15, 2001	Socorro	LINEAR	NYS	1.6 km	MPC · JPL
203425	2001 XZ_{242}	—	December 14, 2001	Socorro	LINEAR	(2076)	1.2 km	MPC · JPL
203426	2001 XZ_{249}	—	December 14, 2001	Socorro	LINEAR	V	1.0 km	MPC · JPL
203427	2001 XT_{252}	—	December 14, 2001	Socorro	LINEAR	NYS	1.2 km	MPC · JPL
203428	2001 XP_{263}	—	December 14, 2001	Anderson Mesa	LONEOS	CYB	7.6 km	MPC · JPL
203429	2001 XB_{264}	—	December 14, 2001	Palomar	NEAT	·	1.2 km	MPC · JPL
203430	2001 YB_{2}	—	December 18, 2001	Socorro	LINEAR	PHO	1.7 km	MPC · JPL
203431	2001 YW_{2}	—	December 17, 2001	Socorro	LINEAR	V	1.2 km	MPC · JPL
203432	2001 YG_{3}	—	December 20, 2001	Socorro	LINEAR	PHO	1.8 km	MPC · JPL
203433	2001 YE_{6}	—	December 17, 2001	Palomar	NEAT	NYS	1.3 km	MPC · JPL
203434	2001 YH_{6}	—	December 17, 2001	Kitt Peak	Spacewatch	·	1.3 km	MPC · JPL
203435	2001 YT_{6}	—	December 17, 2001	Socorro	LINEAR	·	860 m	MPC · JPL
203436	2001 YY_{43}	—	December 18, 2001	Socorro	LINEAR	·	1.3 km	MPC · JPL
203437	2001 YF_{44}	—	December 18, 2001	Socorro	LINEAR	V	1 km	MPC · JPL
203438	2001 YP_{68}	—	December 18, 2001	Socorro	LINEAR	·	1.3 km	MPC · JPL
203439	2001 YJ_{69}	—	December 18, 2001	Socorro	LINEAR	(2076) · slow	1.2 km	MPC · JPL
203440	2001 YZ_{79}	—	December 18, 2001	Socorro	LINEAR	·	1.2 km	MPC · JPL
203441	2001 YD_{81}	—	December 18, 2001	Socorro	LINEAR	·	1 km	MPC · JPL
203442	2001 YY_{81}	—	December 18, 2001	Socorro	LINEAR	·	1.3 km	MPC · JPL
203443	2001 YT_{83}	—	December 18, 2001	Socorro	LINEAR	·	880 m	MPC · JPL
203444	2001 YK_{84}	—	December 18, 2001	Socorro	LINEAR	V	1.5 km	MPC · JPL
203445	2001 YX_{85}	—	December 18, 2001	Socorro	LINEAR	·	1.3 km	MPC · JPL
203446	2001 YZ_{85}	—	December 18, 2001	Socorro	LINEAR	·	1.4 km	MPC · JPL
203447	2001 YP_{86}	—	December 18, 2001	Socorro	LINEAR	NYS	1.6 km	MPC · JPL
203448	2001 YE_{87}	—	December 18, 2001	Socorro	LINEAR	·	1.6 km	MPC · JPL
203449	2001 YE_{88}	—	December 18, 2001	Socorro	LINEAR	V	880 m	MPC · JPL
203450	2001 YH_{88}	—	December 18, 2001	Socorro	LINEAR	·	1.4 km	MPC · JPL
203451	2001 YP_{89}	—	December 18, 2001	Socorro	LINEAR	·	1.0 km	MPC · JPL
203452	2001 YA_{91}	—	December 17, 2001	Palomar	NEAT	·	1.7 km	MPC · JPL
203453	2001 YQ_{95}	—	December 18, 2001	Palomar	NEAT	·	830 m	MPC · JPL
203454	2001 YU_{95}	—	December 18, 2001	Palomar	NEAT	·	1.6 km	MPC · JPL
203455	2001 YE_{96}	—	December 18, 2001	Palomar	NEAT	·	1.5 km	MPC · JPL
203456	2001 YA_{97}	—	December 17, 2001	Socorro	LINEAR	·	1.1 km	MPC · JPL
203457	2001 YW_{104}	—	December 17, 2001	Socorro	LINEAR	·	930 m	MPC · JPL
203458	2001 YU_{105}	—	December 17, 2001	Socorro	LINEAR	·	2.8 km	MPC · JPL
203459	2001 YD_{109}	—	December 18, 2001	Socorro	LINEAR	·	1.3 km	MPC · JPL
203460	2001 YQ_{118}	—	December 18, 2001	Socorro	LINEAR	·	2.0 km	MPC · JPL
203461	2001 YJ_{123}	—	December 17, 2001	Socorro	LINEAR	·	1.2 km	MPC · JPL
203462	2001 YM_{124}	—	December 17, 2001	Socorro	LINEAR	V	1.3 km	MPC · JPL
203463	2001 YU_{130}	—	December 17, 2001	Socorro	LINEAR	·	930 m	MPC · JPL
203464	2001 YM_{135}	—	December 19, 2001	Socorro	LINEAR	NYS	1.3 km	MPC · JPL
203465	2001 YN_{137}	—	December 22, 2001	Socorro	LINEAR	·	1.2 km	MPC · JPL
203466	2001 YR_{138}	—	December 18, 2001	Kitt Peak	Spacewatch	V	1.3 km	MPC · JPL
203467	2001 YR_{151}	—	December 19, 2001	Palomar	NEAT	·	1.4 km	MPC · JPL
203468	2001 YE_{152}	—	December 19, 2001	Palomar	NEAT	·	1.3 km	MPC · JPL
203469	2001 YM_{154}	—	December 19, 2001	Palomar	NEAT	V	1.1 km	MPC · JPL
203470	2002 AU	—	January 6, 2002	Oaxaca	Roe, J. M.	(2076)	1.0 km	MPC · JPL
203471	2002 AU_{4}	—	January 8, 2002	Socorro	LINEAR	ATE	460 m	MPC · JPL
203472	2002 AH_{17}	—	January 12, 2002	Eskridge	Farpoint	·	1.5 km	MPC · JPL
203473	2002 AN_{21}	—	January 9, 2002	Socorro	LINEAR	NYS	1.4 km	MPC · JPL
203474	2002 AK_{23}	—	January 5, 2002	Haleakala	NEAT	·	1.4 km	MPC · JPL
203475	2002 AY_{29}	—	January 8, 2002	Socorro	LINEAR	V	1.2 km	MPC · JPL
203476	2002 AQ_{34}	—	January 10, 2002	Palomar	NEAT	·	2.0 km	MPC · JPL
203477	2002 AS_{36}	—	January 9, 2002	Socorro	LINEAR	·	1.4 km	MPC · JPL
203478	2002 AT_{38}	—	January 9, 2002	Socorro	LINEAR	·	1.0 km	MPC · JPL
203479	2002 AL_{41}	—	January 9, 2002	Socorro	LINEAR	·	1.3 km	MPC · JPL
203480	2002 AP_{48}	—	January 9, 2002	Socorro	LINEAR	·	1.2 km	MPC · JPL
203481	2002 AG_{50}	—	January 9, 2002	Socorro	LINEAR	NYS	2.7 km	MPC · JPL
203482	2002 AP_{51}	—	January 9, 2002	Socorro	LINEAR	NYS	1.5 km	MPC · JPL
203483	2002 AK_{52}	—	January 9, 2002	Socorro	LINEAR	·	1.6 km	MPC · JPL
203484	2002 AB_{54}	—	January 9, 2002	Socorro	LINEAR	·	1.3 km	MPC · JPL
203485	2002 AZ_{61}	—	January 11, 2002	Socorro	LINEAR	·	1.1 km	MPC · JPL
203486	2002 AR_{64}	—	January 11, 2002	Socorro	LINEAR	V	1.1 km	MPC · JPL
203487	2002 AH_{65}	—	January 11, 2002	Socorro	LINEAR	·	1.5 km	MPC · JPL
203488	2002 AL_{73}	—	January 8, 2002	Socorro	LINEAR	(2076)	1.2 km	MPC · JPL
203489	2002 AL_{80}	—	January 8, 2002	Socorro	LINEAR	·	1.4 km	MPC · JPL
203490	2002 AB_{87}	—	January 9, 2002	Socorro	LINEAR	·	1.4 km	MPC · JPL
203491	2002 AM_{91}	—	January 13, 2002	Socorro	LINEAR	·	1.9 km	MPC · JPL
203492	2002 AC_{97}	—	January 8, 2002	Socorro	LINEAR	·	1.8 km	MPC · JPL
203493	2002 AV_{97}	—	January 8, 2002	Socorro	LINEAR	·	2.2 km	MPC · JPL
203494	2002 AO_{98}	—	January 8, 2002	Socorro	LINEAR	·	1.7 km	MPC · JPL
203495	2002 AW_{101}	—	January 8, 2002	Socorro	LINEAR	·	1.5 km	MPC · JPL
203496	2002 AW_{102}	—	January 8, 2002	Socorro	LINEAR	V	900 m	MPC · JPL
203497	2002 AE_{107}	—	January 9, 2002	Socorro	LINEAR	·	1.8 km	MPC · JPL
203498	2002 AV_{109}	—	January 9, 2002	Socorro	LINEAR	·	1.7 km	MPC · JPL
203499	2002 AU_{111}	—	January 9, 2002	Socorro	LINEAR	·	1.9 km	MPC · JPL
203500	2002 AK_{116}	—	January 9, 2002	Socorro	LINEAR	·	3.4 km	MPC · JPL

== 203501–203600 ==
back to top

Designation			Discovery			Properties		Ref
Permanent	Provisional	Named after	Date	Site	Discoverer(s)	Category	Diam.	Ref
203501	2002 AO_{121}	—	January 9, 2002	Socorro	LINEAR	V	1.3 km	MPC · JPL
203502	2002 AW_{122}	—	January 9, 2002	Socorro	LINEAR	·	1.9 km	MPC · JPL
203503	2002 AL_{126}	—	January 13, 2002	Socorro	LINEAR	·	1.6 km	MPC · JPL
203504	2002 AS_{126}	—	January 13, 2002	Socorro	LINEAR	·	1.6 km	MPC · JPL
203505	2002 AN_{130}	—	January 12, 2002	Palomar	NEAT	·	1.4 km	MPC · JPL
203506	2002 AQ_{130}	—	January 12, 2002	Palomar	NEAT	·	1.7 km	MPC · JPL
203507	2002 AY_{141}	—	January 13, 2002	Socorro	LINEAR	NYS	1.5 km	MPC · JPL
203508	2002 AK_{142}	—	January 13, 2002	Socorro	LINEAR	·	1.1 km	MPC · JPL
203509	2002 AZ_{154}	—	January 14, 2002	Socorro	LINEAR	ERI	3.0 km	MPC · JPL
203510	2002 AG_{155}	—	January 14, 2002	Socorro	LINEAR	·	2.4 km	MPC · JPL
203511	2002 AX_{156}	—	January 13, 2002	Socorro	LINEAR	·	1.2 km	MPC · JPL
203512	2002 AB_{160}	—	January 13, 2002	Socorro	LINEAR	·	1.6 km	MPC · JPL
203513	2002 AM_{162}	—	January 13, 2002	Socorro	LINEAR	·	1.1 km	MPC · JPL
203514	2002 AD_{164}	—	January 13, 2002	Socorro	LINEAR	·	1.5 km	MPC · JPL
203515	2002 AJ_{164}	—	January 13, 2002	Socorro	LINEAR	·	3.6 km	MPC · JPL
203516	2002 AM_{165}	—	January 13, 2002	Socorro	LINEAR	·	1.2 km	MPC · JPL
203517	2002 AP_{167}	—	January 13, 2002	Socorro	LINEAR	·	2.5 km	MPC · JPL
203518	2002 AC_{174}	—	January 14, 2002	Socorro	LINEAR	·	1.2 km	MPC · JPL
203519	2002 AN_{179}	—	January 14, 2002	Socorro	LINEAR	·	1.1 km	MPC · JPL
203520	2002 AO_{179}	—	January 14, 2002	Socorro	LINEAR	·	2.2 km	MPC · JPL
203521	2002 AP_{183}	—	January 6, 2002	Palomar	NEAT	V	990 m	MPC · JPL
203522	2002 AL_{185}	—	January 8, 2002	Socorro	LINEAR	(2076)	1.1 km	MPC · JPL
203523	2002 AS_{208}	—	January 9, 2002	Socorro	LINEAR	·	1.4 km	MPC · JPL
203524	2002 BF_{8}	—	January 18, 2002	Socorro	LINEAR	·	2.1 km	MPC · JPL
203525	2002 BV_{11}	—	January 19, 2002	Socorro	LINEAR	·	2.7 km	MPC · JPL
203526	2002 BP_{14}	—	January 19, 2002	Socorro	LINEAR	·	1.7 km	MPC · JPL
203527	2002 BT_{19}	—	January 22, 2002	Socorro	LINEAR	·	1.3 km	MPC · JPL
203528	2002 BV_{19}	—	January 22, 2002	Socorro	LINEAR	·	1.2 km	MPC · JPL
203529	2002 BL_{22}	—	January 22, 2002	Socorro	LINEAR	NYS	1.4 km	MPC · JPL
203530	2002 BV_{27}	—	January 20, 2002	Anderson Mesa	LONEOS	·	1.7 km	MPC · JPL
203531	2002 CB_{9}	—	February 6, 2002	Kitt Peak	Spacewatch	·	2.2 km	MPC · JPL
203532	2002 CU_{12}	—	February 8, 2002	Fountain Hills	C. W. Juels, P. R. Holvorcem	·	1.6 km	MPC · JPL
203533	2002 CL_{16}	—	February 6, 2002	Socorro	LINEAR	·	1.3 km	MPC · JPL
203534	2002 CR_{16}	—	February 6, 2002	Socorro	LINEAR	V	1.2 km	MPC · JPL
203535	2002 CW_{21}	—	February 5, 2002	Palomar	NEAT	NYS	1.5 km	MPC · JPL
203536	2002 CB_{22}	—	February 5, 2002	Palomar	NEAT	V	1.1 km	MPC · JPL
203537	2002 CG_{28}	—	February 6, 2002	Socorro	LINEAR	V	1.3 km	MPC · JPL
203538	2002 CK_{38}	—	February 7, 2002	Socorro	LINEAR	NYS	1.4 km	MPC · JPL
203539	2002 CZ_{40}	—	February 7, 2002	Palomar	NEAT	·	1.6 km	MPC · JPL
203540	2002 CY_{47}	—	February 3, 2002	Haleakala	NEAT	·	2.5 km	MPC · JPL
203541	2002 CM_{48}	—	February 3, 2002	Haleakala	NEAT	·	1.9 km	MPC · JPL
203542	2002 CW_{52}	—	February 7, 2002	Socorro	LINEAR	·	920 m	MPC · JPL
203543	2002 CT_{59}	—	February 13, 2002	Desert Eagle	W. K. Y. Yeung	ERI	3.4 km	MPC · JPL
203544	2002 CH_{66}	—	February 7, 2002	Socorro	LINEAR	·	1.5 km	MPC · JPL
203545	2002 CJ_{67}	—	February 7, 2002	Socorro	LINEAR	·	960 m	MPC · JPL
203546	2002 CK_{72}	—	February 7, 2002	Socorro	LINEAR	·	2.4 km	MPC · JPL
203547	2002 CY_{72}	—	February 7, 2002	Socorro	LINEAR	·	870 m	MPC · JPL
203548	2002 CS_{73}	—	February 7, 2002	Socorro	LINEAR	V	970 m	MPC · JPL
203549	2002 CM_{75}	—	February 7, 2002	Socorro	LINEAR	·	2.9 km	MPC · JPL
203550	2002 CE_{76}	—	February 7, 2002	Socorro	LINEAR	·	1.7 km	MPC · JPL
203551	2002 CS_{79}	—	February 7, 2002	Socorro	LINEAR	MAS	1.0 km	MPC · JPL
203552	2002 CD_{82}	—	February 7, 2002	Socorro	LINEAR	MAS	900 m	MPC · JPL
203553	2002 CW_{86}	—	February 7, 2002	Socorro	LINEAR	·	1.9 km	MPC · JPL
203554	2002 CD_{90}	—	February 7, 2002	Socorro	LINEAR	MAS	1.0 km	MPC · JPL
203555	2002 CZ_{94}	—	February 7, 2002	Socorro	LINEAR	MAS	960 m	MPC · JPL
203556	2002 CK_{98}	—	February 7, 2002	Socorro	LINEAR	NYS	2.1 km	MPC · JPL
203557	2002 CV_{99}	—	February 7, 2002	Socorro	LINEAR	·	1.3 km	MPC · JPL
203558	2002 CA_{101}	—	February 7, 2002	Socorro	LINEAR	NYS	1.2 km	MPC · JPL
203559	2002 CJ_{113}	—	February 8, 2002	Socorro	LINEAR	·	1.4 km	MPC · JPL
203560	2002 CV_{113}	—	February 8, 2002	Socorro	LINEAR	·	1.9 km	MPC · JPL
203561	2002 CC_{119}	—	February 7, 2002	Socorro	LINEAR	·	1.0 km	MPC · JPL
203562	2002 CM_{119}	—	February 7, 2002	Socorro	LINEAR	·	1.4 km	MPC · JPL
203563	2002 CV_{119}	—	February 7, 2002	Socorro	LINEAR	·	1.8 km	MPC · JPL
203564	2002 CO_{120}	—	February 7, 2002	Socorro	LINEAR	·	1.4 km	MPC · JPL
203565	2002 CR_{122}	—	February 7, 2002	Socorro	LINEAR	MAS	960 m	MPC · JPL
203566	2002 CS_{134}	—	February 7, 2002	Socorro	LINEAR	·	1.4 km	MPC · JPL
203567	2002 CB_{145}	—	February 9, 2002	Socorro	LINEAR	·	1.8 km	MPC · JPL
203568	2002 CL_{150}	—	February 10, 2002	Socorro	LINEAR	·	2.5 km	MPC · JPL
203569	2002 CY_{151}	—	February 10, 2002	Socorro	LINEAR	MAS	1 km	MPC · JPL
203570	2002 CM_{152}	—	February 11, 2002	Socorro	LINEAR	V	790 m	MPC · JPL
203571	2002 CK_{155}	—	February 6, 2002	Socorro	LINEAR	·	2.7 km	MPC · JPL
203572	2002 CE_{167}	—	February 8, 2002	Socorro	LINEAR	·	1.9 km	MPC · JPL
203573	2002 CM_{178}	—	February 10, 2002	Socorro	LINEAR	·	1.3 km	MPC · JPL
203574	2002 CW_{185}	—	February 10, 2002	Socorro	LINEAR	NYS	1.4 km	MPC · JPL
203575	2002 CN_{203}	—	February 10, 2002	Socorro	LINEAR	NYS	1.2 km	MPC · JPL
203576	2002 CT_{203}	—	February 10, 2002	Socorro	LINEAR	NYS	1.5 km	MPC · JPL
203577	2002 CR_{209}	—	February 10, 2002	Socorro	LINEAR	·	2.2 km	MPC · JPL
203578	2002 CQ_{214}	—	February 10, 2002	Socorro	LINEAR	MAS	930 m	MPC · JPL
203579	2002 CB_{217}	—	February 10, 2002	Socorro	LINEAR	·	1.8 km	MPC · JPL
203580	2002 CG_{217}	—	February 10, 2002	Socorro	LINEAR	·	1.6 km	MPC · JPL
203581	2002 CK_{222}	—	February 11, 2002	Socorro	LINEAR	NYS	1.4 km	MPC · JPL
203582	2002 CS_{232}	—	February 10, 2002	Socorro	LINEAR	V	1.1 km	MPC · JPL
203583	2002 CN_{233}	—	February 11, 2002	Socorro	LINEAR	·	1.5 km	MPC · JPL
203584	2002 CV_{235}	—	February 11, 2002	Socorro	LINEAR	NYS	1.5 km	MPC · JPL
203585	2002 CZ_{236}	—	February 9, 2002	Socorro	LINEAR	·	1.8 km	MPC · JPL
203586	2002 CA_{242}	—	February 11, 2002	Socorro	LINEAR	·	1.6 km	MPC · JPL
203587	2002 CK_{246}	—	February 13, 2002	Kitt Peak	Spacewatch	·	1.2 km	MPC · JPL
203588	2002 CZ_{252}	—	February 5, 2002	Anderson Mesa	LONEOS	·	1.7 km	MPC · JPL
203589	2002 CE_{254}	—	February 5, 2002	Anderson Mesa	LONEOS	·	1.4 km	MPC · JPL
203590	2002 CC_{275}	—	February 9, 2002	Kvistaberg	Uppsala-DLR Asteroid Survey	·	1.4 km	MPC · JPL
203591	2002 CL_{277}	—	February 7, 2002	Palomar	NEAT	·	1.2 km	MPC · JPL
203592	2002 CQ_{278}	—	February 7, 2002	Kitt Peak	Spacewatch	·	2.3 km	MPC · JPL
203593	2002 CG_{283}	—	February 8, 2002	Kitt Peak	Spacewatch	·	2.9 km	MPC · JPL
203594	2002 CQ_{287}	—	February 9, 2002	Socorro	LINEAR	·	1.9 km	MPC · JPL
203595	2002 CK_{292}	—	February 11, 2002	Socorro	LINEAR	·	1.8 km	MPC · JPL
203596	2002 CE_{299}	—	February 12, 2002	Socorro	LINEAR	·	1.8 km	MPC · JPL
203597	2002 CA_{301}	—	February 11, 2002	Socorro	LINEAR	MAS	930 m	MPC · JPL
203598	2002 CE_{310}	—	February 6, 2002	Palomar	NEAT	·	1.9 km	MPC · JPL
203599	2002 CB_{311}	—	February 10, 2002	Socorro	LINEAR	·	1.4 km	MPC · JPL
203600	2002 CN_{314}	—	February 7, 2002	Haleakala	NEAT	·	2.1 km	MPC · JPL

== 203601–203700 ==
back to top

Designation			Discovery			Properties		Ref
Permanent	Provisional	Named after	Date	Site	Discoverer(s)	Category	Diam.	Ref
203601	2002 DR_{1}	—	February 19, 2002	Desert Eagle	W. K. Y. Yeung	NYS	1.6 km	MPC · JPL
203602 Danjoyce	2002 ED	Danjoyce	March 4, 2002	Desert Moon	Stevens, B. L.	·	1.5 km	MPC · JPL
203603	2002 EJ_{2}	—	March 9, 2002	Bohyunsan	Bohyunsan	·	1.2 km	MPC · JPL
203604	2002 EJ_{21}	—	March 10, 2002	Haleakala	NEAT	·	1.5 km	MPC · JPL
203605	2002 EW_{24}	—	March 5, 2002	Kitt Peak	Spacewatch	NYS	1.2 km	MPC · JPL
203606	2002 EG_{28}	—	March 9, 2002	Socorro	LINEAR	·	3.7 km	MPC · JPL
203607	2002 EA_{54}	—	March 13, 2002	Socorro	LINEAR	·	1.7 km	MPC · JPL
203608	2002 EV_{58}	—	March 13, 2002	Socorro	LINEAR	·	2.0 km	MPC · JPL
203609	2002 EW_{65}	—	March 13, 2002	Socorro	LINEAR	·	1.3 km	MPC · JPL
203610	2002 EC_{67}	—	March 13, 2002	Socorro	LINEAR	·	1.6 km	MPC · JPL
203611	2002 EP_{67}	—	March 13, 2002	Socorro	LINEAR	·	1.3 km	MPC · JPL
203612	2002 EG_{78}	—	March 11, 2002	Kitt Peak	Spacewatch	·	2.7 km	MPC · JPL
203613	2002 EF_{81}	—	March 13, 2002	Palomar	NEAT	·	1.3 km	MPC · JPL
203614	2002 EL_{88}	—	March 9, 2002	Socorro	LINEAR	NYS	2.0 km	MPC · JPL
203615	2002 EA_{91}	—	March 12, 2002	Socorro	LINEAR	·	1.8 km	MPC · JPL
203616	2002 EM_{97}	—	March 12, 2002	Socorro	LINEAR	·	2.9 km	MPC · JPL
203617	2002 EM_{108}	—	March 9, 2002	Palomar	NEAT	·	1.1 km	MPC · JPL
203618	2002 EX_{115}	—	March 10, 2002	Haleakala	NEAT	·	2.6 km	MPC · JPL
203619	2002 EO_{120}	—	March 11, 2002	Kitt Peak	Spacewatch	ERI	1.9 km	MPC · JPL
203620	2002 EU_{125}	—	March 11, 2002	Palomar	NEAT	CLA	2.1 km	MPC · JPL
203621	2002 EB_{129}	—	March 13, 2002	Palomar	NEAT	MAS	1.0 km	MPC · JPL
203622	2002 EP_{129}	—	March 13, 2002	Palomar	NEAT	fast	1.5 km	MPC · JPL
203623	2002 FU	—	March 18, 2002	Desert Eagle	W. K. Y. Yeung	·	1.8 km	MPC · JPL
203624	2002 FZ_{3}	—	March 20, 2002	Desert Eagle	W. K. Y. Yeung	·	1.8 km	MPC · JPL
203625	2002 FH_{13}	—	March 16, 2002	Socorro	LINEAR	NYS	2.1 km	MPC · JPL
203626	2002 FQ_{16}	—	March 16, 2002	Haleakala	NEAT	·	1.8 km	MPC · JPL
203627	2002 FC_{20}	—	March 18, 2002	Socorro	LINEAR	·	2.5 km	MPC · JPL
203628	2002 FP_{22}	—	March 19, 2002	Socorro	LINEAR	·	2.2 km	MPC · JPL
203629	2002 FP_{25}	—	March 19, 2002	Palomar	NEAT	PHO	4.0 km	MPC · JPL
203630	2002 FR_{27}	—	March 20, 2002	Socorro	LINEAR	·	1.9 km	MPC · JPL
203631	2002 FF_{29}	—	March 20, 2002	Socorro	LINEAR	·	2.2 km	MPC · JPL
203632	2002 FN_{38}	—	March 30, 2002	Palomar	NEAT	·	1.6 km	MPC · JPL
203633	2002 FO_{38}	—	March 30, 2002	Palomar	NEAT	·	1.3 km	MPC · JPL
203634	2002 GH_{3}	—	April 6, 2002	Socorro	LINEAR	H	1.1 km	MPC · JPL
203635	2002 GK_{24}	—	April 13, 2002	Kitt Peak	Spacewatch	·	1.4 km	MPC · JPL
203636	2002 GZ_{41}	—	April 4, 2002	Palomar	NEAT	NYS	1.8 km	MPC · JPL
203637	2002 GY_{44}	—	April 4, 2002	Palomar	NEAT	MAS	1.0 km	MPC · JPL
203638	2002 GL_{45}	—	April 4, 2002	Palomar	NEAT	MAS	1.2 km	MPC · JPL
203639	2002 GK_{70}	—	April 8, 2002	Palomar	NEAT	·	2.2 km	MPC · JPL
203640	2002 GT_{77}	—	April 9, 2002	Socorro	LINEAR	·	1.7 km	MPC · JPL
203641	2002 GZ_{81}	—	April 10, 2002	Socorro	LINEAR	·	2.3 km	MPC · JPL
203642	2002 GR_{83}	—	April 10, 2002	Socorro	LINEAR	·	1.7 km	MPC · JPL
203643	2002 GK_{96}	—	April 9, 2002	Socorro	LINEAR	·	1.5 km	MPC · JPL
203644	2002 GC_{99}	—	April 10, 2002	Socorro	LINEAR	NYS	1.6 km	MPC · JPL
203645	2002 GF_{99}	—	April 10, 2002	Socorro	LINEAR	·	2.6 km	MPC · JPL
203646	2002 GL_{100}	—	April 10, 2002	Socorro	LINEAR	·	1.4 km	MPC · JPL
203647	2002 GS_{116}	—	April 11, 2002	Socorro	LINEAR	·	1.9 km	MPC · JPL
203648	2002 GQ_{123}	—	April 11, 2002	Socorro	LINEAR	NYS	2.5 km	MPC · JPL
203649	2002 GQ_{142}	—	April 13, 2002	Palomar	NEAT	MAS	1.1 km	MPC · JPL
203650	2002 GV_{159}	—	April 14, 2002	Palomar	NEAT	·	2.5 km	MPC · JPL
203651	2002 GK_{163}	—	April 14, 2002	Kitt Peak	Spacewatch	NYS	1.5 km	MPC · JPL
203652	2002 GS_{164}	—	April 14, 2002	Palomar	NEAT	·	2.4 km	MPC · JPL
203653	2002 GR_{171}	—	April 10, 2002	Socorro	LINEAR	MAS	1.0 km	MPC · JPL
203654	2002 GW_{175}	—	April 11, 2002	Socorro	LINEAR	·	2.1 km	MPC · JPL
203655	2002 HO_{15}	—	April 17, 2002	Socorro	LINEAR	MAS	1.2 km	MPC · JPL
203656	2002 JL_{14}	—	May 7, 2002	Socorro	LINEAR	·	2.1 km	MPC · JPL
203657	2002 JP_{15}	—	May 8, 2002	Socorro	LINEAR	V	1.1 km	MPC · JPL
203658	2002 JX_{16}	—	May 7, 2002	Palomar	NEAT	·	1.5 km	MPC · JPL
203659	2002 JF_{18}	—	May 7, 2002	Palomar	NEAT	EUN	1.5 km	MPC · JPL
203660	2002 JG_{20}	—	May 6, 2002	Palomar	NEAT	·	2.5 km	MPC · JPL
203661	2002 JY_{44}	—	May 9, 2002	Socorro	LINEAR	·	1.7 km	MPC · JPL
203662	2002 JZ_{63}	—	May 9, 2002	Socorro	LINEAR	·	1.8 km	MPC · JPL
203663	2002 JH_{64}	—	May 9, 2002	Socorro	LINEAR	·	1.5 km	MPC · JPL
203664	2002 JY_{73}	—	May 8, 2002	Socorro	LINEAR	·	4.1 km	MPC · JPL
203665	2002 JZ_{73}	—	May 8, 2002	Socorro	LINEAR	·	3.1 km	MPC · JPL
203666	2002 JU_{77}	—	May 11, 2002	Socorro	LINEAR	V	1.1 km	MPC · JPL
203667	2002 JW_{88}	—	May 11, 2002	Socorro	LINEAR	KON	3.1 km	MPC · JPL
203668	2002 JQ_{104}	—	May 11, 2002	Socorro	LINEAR	·	3.0 km	MPC · JPL
203669	2002 JG_{115}	—	May 15, 2002	Socorro	LINEAR	·	1.7 km	MPC · JPL
203670	2002 JH_{120}	—	May 5, 2002	Kitt Peak	Spacewatch	·	2.2 km	MPC · JPL
203671	2002 JN_{123}	—	May 6, 2002	Palomar	NEAT	·	2.3 km	MPC · JPL
203672	2002 JF_{136}	—	May 9, 2002	Palomar	NEAT	MAS	990 m	MPC · JPL
203673	2002 JF_{146}	—	May 15, 2002	Socorro	LINEAR	MAR	1.4 km	MPC · JPL
203674	2002 JM_{147}	—	May 10, 2002	Socorro	LINEAR	·	1.7 km	MPC · JPL
203675	2002 LH	—	June 1, 2002	Palomar	NEAT	·	1.9 km	MPC · JPL
203676	2002 LP_{6}	—	June 1, 2002	Palomar	NEAT	·	3.2 km	MPC · JPL
203677	2002 LB_{8}	—	June 5, 2002	Socorro	LINEAR	·	3.5 km	MPC · JPL
203678	2002 LP_{43}	—	June 10, 2002	Socorro	LINEAR	·	5.1 km	MPC · JPL
203679	2002 MK	—	June 16, 2002	Socorro	LINEAR	H	790 m	MPC · JPL
203680	2002 NU_{5}	—	July 10, 2002	Campo Imperatore	CINEOS	·	2.3 km	MPC · JPL
203681	2002 NX_{11}	—	July 4, 2002	Palomar	NEAT	DOR	5.8 km	MPC · JPL
203682	2002 NN_{13}	—	July 4, 2002	Palomar	NEAT	·	4.0 km	MPC · JPL
203683	2002 NJ_{18}	—	July 9, 2002	Socorro	LINEAR	EUN	2.2 km	MPC · JPL
203684	2002 NM_{25}	—	July 9, 2002	Socorro	LINEAR	DOR	5.6 km	MPC · JPL
203685	2002 NT_{35}	—	July 9, 2002	Socorro	LINEAR	·	2.3 km	MPC · JPL
203686	2002 NQ_{38}	—	July 14, 2002	Palomar	NEAT	·	4.8 km	MPC · JPL
203687	2002 ND_{39}	—	July 13, 2002	Socorro	LINEAR	·	8.3 km	MPC · JPL
203688	2002 NF_{39}	—	July 13, 2002	Socorro	LINEAR	·	6.2 km	MPC · JPL
203689	2002 NN_{49}	—	July 14, 2002	Palomar	NEAT	·	4.5 km	MPC · JPL
203690	2002 NK_{53}	—	July 14, 2002	Palomar	NEAT	(13314)	2.6 km	MPC · JPL
203691	2002 NV_{53}	—	July 4, 2002	Palomar	NEAT	·	1.9 km	MPC · JPL
203692	2002 NK_{59}	—	July 8, 2002	Xinglong	SCAP	GEF	2.0 km	MPC · JPL
203693	2002 NU_{63}	—	July 8, 2002	Palomar	NEAT	·	1.8 km	MPC · JPL
203694	2002 ND_{66}	—	July 9, 2002	Palomar	NEAT	·	3.2 km	MPC · JPL
203695	2002 NK_{66}	—	July 9, 2002	Palomar	NEAT	·	3.2 km	MPC · JPL
203696	2002 OJ_{9}	—	July 21, 2002	Palomar	NEAT	HOF	4.1 km	MPC · JPL
203697	2002 OV_{12}	—	July 17, 2002	Socorro	LINEAR	·	2.2 km	MPC · JPL
203698	2002 OT_{21}	—	July 18, 2002	Palomar	NEAT	·	2.8 km	MPC · JPL
203699	2002 OE_{29}	—	July 18, 2002	Palomar	NEAT	·	1.9 km	MPC · JPL
203700	2002 OG_{31}	—	July 17, 2002	Palomar	NEAT	·	2.0 km	MPC · JPL

== 203701–203800 ==
back to top

Designation			Discovery			Properties		Ref
Permanent	Provisional	Named after	Date	Site	Discoverer(s)	Category	Diam.	Ref
203701	2002 PE_{20}	—	August 6, 2002	Palomar	NEAT	·	2.3 km	MPC · JPL
203702	2002 PV_{28}	—	August 6, 2002	Palomar	NEAT	·	3.9 km	MPC · JPL
203703	2002 PS_{33}	—	August 6, 2002	Campo Imperatore	CINEOS	·	2.3 km	MPC · JPL
203704	2002 PX_{34}	—	August 5, 2002	Campo Imperatore	CINEOS	·	2.4 km	MPC · JPL
203705	2002 PG_{35}	—	August 6, 2002	Palomar	NEAT	HOF	4.0 km	MPC · JPL
203706	2002 PG_{81}	—	August 13, 2002	Palomar	NEAT	·	3.4 km	MPC · JPL
203707	2002 PP_{94}	—	August 12, 2002	Haleakala	NEAT	·	3.4 km	MPC · JPL
203708	2002 PG_{115}	—	August 15, 2002	Kitt Peak	Spacewatch	·	2.1 km	MPC · JPL
203709	2002 PS_{122}	—	August 14, 2002	Anderson Mesa	LONEOS	·	2.2 km	MPC · JPL
203710	2002 PJ_{133}	—	August 14, 2002	Socorro	LINEAR	(5)	2.0 km	MPC · JPL
203711	2002 PQ_{141}	—	August 15, 2002	Socorro	LINEAR	EUP	6.6 km	MPC · JPL
203712	2002 PF_{159}	—	August 8, 2002	Palomar	S. F. Hönig	AST	3.5 km	MPC · JPL
203713	2002 PJ_{163}	—	August 8, 2002	Palomar	S. F. Hönig	·	2.4 km	MPC · JPL
203714	2002 PP_{163}	—	August 8, 2002	Palomar	S. F. Hönig	NEM	3.0 km	MPC · JPL
203715	2002 PY_{163}	—	August 8, 2002	Palomar	S. F. Hönig	·	3.4 km	MPC · JPL
203716	2002 PA_{165}	—	August 8, 2002	Palomar	S. F. Hönig	·	2.5 km	MPC · JPL
203717	2002 PK_{172}	—	August 11, 2002	Palomar	NEAT	·	2.9 km	MPC · JPL
203718	2002 PS_{178}	—	August 13, 2002	Kitt Peak	Spacewatch	·	3.0 km	MPC · JPL
203719	2002 PQ_{179}	—	August 8, 2002	Palomar	NEAT	·	2.8 km	MPC · JPL
203720	2002 PM_{181}	—	August 15, 2002	Palomar	NEAT	·	2.5 km	MPC · JPL
203721	2002 QP_{3}	—	August 16, 2002	Palomar	NEAT	·	3.3 km	MPC · JPL
203722	2002 QB_{11}	—	August 17, 2002	Socorro	LINEAR	EUP	5.3 km	MPC · JPL
203723	2002 QL_{14}	—	August 26, 2002	Palomar	NEAT	·	2.9 km	MPC · JPL
203724	2002 QY_{21}	—	August 27, 2002	Palomar	NEAT	DOR	3.5 km	MPC · JPL
203725	2002 QV_{32}	—	August 29, 2002	Palomar	NEAT	·	2.2 km	MPC · JPL
203726	2002 QW_{35}	—	August 29, 2002	Palomar	NEAT	·	3.3 km	MPC · JPL
203727	2002 QM_{47}	—	August 30, 2002	Anderson Mesa	LONEOS	·	2.2 km	MPC · JPL
203728	2002 QM_{53}	—	August 29, 2002	Palomar	S. F. Hönig	·	3.2 km	MPC · JPL
203729	2002 QR_{53}	—	August 29, 2002	Palomar	S. F. Hönig	·	3.0 km	MPC · JPL
203730	2002 QV_{55}	—	August 29, 2002	Palomar	S. F. Hönig	·	2.6 km	MPC · JPL
203731	2002 QE_{59}	—	August 28, 2002	Palomar	NEAT	MAR	1.6 km	MPC · JPL
203732	2002 QY_{59}	—	August 26, 2002	Palomar	NEAT	·	2.9 km	MPC · JPL
203733	2002 QT_{62}	—	August 28, 2002	Palomar	NEAT	·	2.6 km	MPC · JPL
203734	2002 QS_{63}	—	August 30, 2002	Palomar	NEAT	·	2.8 km	MPC · JPL
203735	2002 QH_{65}	—	August 18, 2002	Palomar	NEAT	AST	3.2 km	MPC · JPL
203736	2002 QJ_{65}	—	August 19, 2002	Palomar	NEAT	AST	1.9 km	MPC · JPL
203737	2002 QA_{78}	—	August 17, 2002	Palomar	NEAT	·	2.5 km	MPC · JPL
203738	2002 QB_{88}	—	August 27, 2002	Palomar	NEAT	·	2.5 km	MPC · JPL
203739	2002 QZ_{94}	—	August 30, 2002	Palomar	NEAT	·	2.9 km	MPC · JPL
203740	2002 QF_{95}	—	August 18, 2002	Palomar	NEAT	AGN ·	2.9 km	MPC · JPL
203741	2002 QM_{96}	—	August 18, 2002	Palomar	NEAT	·	2.5 km	MPC · JPL
203742	2002 QH_{111}	—	August 17, 2002	Palomar	NEAT	·	3.3 km	MPC · JPL
203743	2002 QR_{119}	—	August 17, 2002	Palomar	NEAT	·	2.3 km	MPC · JPL
203744	2002 QR_{123}	—	August 29, 2002	Palomar	NEAT	AGN	1.7 km	MPC · JPL
203745	2002 RH_{23}	—	September 4, 2002	Anderson Mesa	LONEOS	·	5.7 km	MPC · JPL
203746	2002 RQ_{30}	—	September 4, 2002	Anderson Mesa	LONEOS	·	3.4 km	MPC · JPL
203747	2002 RN_{51}	—	September 5, 2002	Socorro	LINEAR	·	5.4 km	MPC · JPL
203748	2002 RE_{55}	—	September 5, 2002	Anderson Mesa	LONEOS	·	4.8 km	MPC · JPL
203749	2002 RN_{55}	—	September 5, 2002	Anderson Mesa	LONEOS	·	3.1 km	MPC · JPL
203750	2002 RF_{69}	—	September 4, 2002	Anderson Mesa	LONEOS	KOR	2.4 km	MPC · JPL
203751	2002 RA_{72}	—	September 5, 2002	Socorro	LINEAR	·	2.6 km	MPC · JPL
203752	2002 RL_{96}	—	September 5, 2002	Socorro	LINEAR	·	5.2 km	MPC · JPL
203753	2002 RY_{117}	—	September 2, 2002	Kvistaberg	Uppsala-DLR Asteroid Survey	·	3.5 km	MPC · JPL
203754	2002 RE_{133}	—	September 9, 2002	Haleakala	NEAT	·	5.6 km	MPC · JPL
203755	2002 RL_{134}	—	September 10, 2002	Palomar	NEAT	·	2.7 km	MPC · JPL
203756	2002 RP_{135}	—	September 10, 2002	Palomar	NEAT	slow	5.0 km	MPC · JPL
203757	2002 RS_{143}	—	September 11, 2002	Palomar	NEAT	·	2.3 km	MPC · JPL
203758	2002 RK_{153}	—	September 12, 2002	Palomar	NEAT	EOS	3.2 km	MPC · JPL
203759	2002 RL_{161}	—	September 12, 2002	Palomar	NEAT	KOR	2.0 km	MPC · JPL
203760	2002 RC_{166}	—	September 13, 2002	Palomar	NEAT	KOR	1.9 km	MPC · JPL
203761	2002 RA_{167}	—	September 13, 2002	Palomar	NEAT	·	2.2 km	MPC · JPL
203762	2002 RM_{172}	—	September 13, 2002	Anderson Mesa	LONEOS	·	4.8 km	MPC · JPL
203763	2002 RE_{174}	—	September 13, 2002	Palomar	NEAT	HOF	5.3 km	MPC · JPL
203764	2002 RY_{195}	—	September 12, 2002	Palomar	NEAT	KOR	1.6 km	MPC · JPL
203765	2002 RB_{196}	—	September 12, 2002	Palomar	NEAT	·	2.9 km	MPC · JPL
203766	2002 RX_{202}	—	September 13, 2002	Palomar	NEAT	·	3.1 km	MPC · JPL
203767	2002 RP_{212}	—	September 15, 2002	Haleakala	NEAT	·	4.2 km	MPC · JPL
203768	2002 RW_{216}	—	September 14, 2002	Palomar	NEAT	·	3.0 km	MPC · JPL
203769	2002 RL_{219}	—	September 15, 2002	Palomar	NEAT	KOR	2.3 km	MPC · JPL
203770	2002 RE_{222}	—	September 15, 2002	Haleakala	NEAT	MRX	1.7 km	MPC · JPL
203771	2002 RY_{233}	—	September 14, 2002	Palomar	R. Matson	KOR	2.3 km	MPC · JPL
203772	2002 RS_{261}	—	September 4, 2002	Palomar	NEAT	·	5.4 km	MPC · JPL
203773 Magyarics	2002 RL_{267}	Magyarics	September 14, 2002	Palomar	NEAT	·	2.5 km	MPC · JPL
203774	2002 SX_{4}	—	September 27, 2002	Palomar	NEAT	·	3.3 km	MPC · JPL
203775	2002 SQ_{7}	—	September 27, 2002	Palomar	NEAT	·	2.6 km	MPC · JPL
203776	2002 SG_{34}	—	September 29, 2002	Haleakala	NEAT	·	4.2 km	MPC · JPL
203777	2002 SB_{38}	—	September 30, 2002	Socorro	LINEAR	·	3.1 km	MPC · JPL
203778	2002 SQ_{42}	—	September 28, 2002	Haleakala	NEAT	·	3.4 km	MPC · JPL
203779	2002 SK_{63}	—	September 26, 2002	Palomar	NEAT	·	2.1 km	MPC · JPL
203780	2002 SL_{71}	—	September 26, 2002	Palomar	NEAT	KOR	1.9 km	MPC · JPL
203781	2002 SA_{72}	—	September 26, 2002	Palomar	NEAT	·	2.8 km	MPC · JPL
203782	2002 TU	—	October 1, 2002	Anderson Mesa	LONEOS	·	2.9 km	MPC · JPL
203783	2002 TZ	—	October 1, 2002	Anderson Mesa	LONEOS	·	3.0 km	MPC · JPL
203784	2002 TJ_{3}	—	October 1, 2002	Anderson Mesa	LONEOS	·	4.1 km	MPC · JPL
203785	2002 TE_{7}	—	October 1, 2002	Anderson Mesa	LONEOS	·	2.9 km	MPC · JPL
203786	2002 TP_{11}	—	October 1, 2002	Anderson Mesa	LONEOS	AGN	2.0 km	MPC · JPL
203787	2002 TH_{22}	—	October 2, 2002	Socorro	LINEAR	·	2.0 km	MPC · JPL
203788	2002 TV_{39}	—	October 2, 2002	Socorro	LINEAR	T_{j} (2.95)	6.3 km	MPC · JPL
203789	2002 TN_{40}	—	October 2, 2002	Socorro	LINEAR	·	5.5 km	MPC · JPL
203790	2002 TC_{48}	—	October 2, 2002	Socorro	LINEAR	HYG	4.0 km	MPC · JPL
203791	2002 TD_{62}	—	October 3, 2002	Campo Imperatore	CINEOS	·	2.3 km	MPC · JPL
203792	2002 TM_{68}	—	October 7, 2002	Anderson Mesa	LONEOS	EOS	3.5 km	MPC · JPL
203793	2002 TE_{73}	—	October 3, 2002	Palomar	NEAT	(31811)	5.7 km	MPC · JPL
203794	2002 TR_{83}	—	October 2, 2002	Haleakala	NEAT	·	3.4 km	MPC · JPL
203795	2002 TE_{90}	—	October 3, 2002	Palomar	NEAT	·	2.8 km	MPC · JPL
203796	2002 TY_{94}	—	October 3, 2002	Socorro	LINEAR	KOR	2.2 km	MPC · JPL
203797	2002 TH_{97}	—	October 2, 2002	Socorro	LINEAR	KOR	1.8 km	MPC · JPL
203798	2002 TU_{101}	—	October 4, 2002	Socorro	LINEAR	EOS	3.1 km	MPC · JPL
203799	2002 TW_{107}	—	October 1, 2002	Anderson Mesa	LONEOS	·	4.4 km	MPC · JPL
203800	2002 TA_{110}	—	October 2, 2002	Haleakala	NEAT	·	4.1 km	MPC · JPL

== 203801–203900 ==
back to top

Designation			Discovery			Properties		Ref
Permanent	Provisional	Named after	Date	Site	Discoverer(s)	Category	Diam.	Ref
203801	2002 TN_{116}	—	October 3, 2002	Palomar	NEAT	GEF	2.3 km	MPC · JPL
203802	2002 TW_{116}	—	October 3, 2002	Palomar	NEAT	·	4.3 km	MPC · JPL
203803	2002 TO_{118}	—	October 3, 2002	Palomar	NEAT	EOS	3.4 km	MPC · JPL
203804	2002 TJ_{119}	—	October 3, 2002	Palomar	NEAT	·	3.5 km	MPC · JPL
203805	2002 TZ_{120}	—	October 3, 2002	Palomar	NEAT	·	5.6 km	MPC · JPL
203806	2002 TA_{122}	—	October 3, 2002	Campo Imperatore	CINEOS	MAR	1.8 km	MPC · JPL
203807	2002 TG_{146}	—	October 4, 2002	Socorro	LINEAR	·	3.1 km	MPC · JPL
203808	2002 TV_{176}	—	October 5, 2002	Socorro	LINEAR	·	5.5 km	MPC · JPL
203809	2002 TT_{177}	—	October 11, 2002	Palomar	NEAT	·	3.7 km	MPC · JPL
203810	2002 TY_{190}	—	October 1, 2002	Socorro	LINEAR	·	9.1 km	MPC · JPL
203811	2002 TB_{191}	—	October 1, 2002	Socorro	LINEAR	·	5.0 km	MPC · JPL
203812	2002 TA_{203}	—	October 4, 2002	Socorro	LINEAR	·	4.7 km	MPC · JPL
203813	2002 TL_{216}	—	October 6, 2002	Socorro	LINEAR	·	4.7 km	MPC · JPL
203814	2002 TA_{235}	—	October 6, 2002	Socorro	LINEAR	·	4.4 km	MPC · JPL
203815	2002 TQ_{235}	—	October 6, 2002	Socorro	LINEAR	·	6.1 km	MPC · JPL
203816	2002 TB_{236}	—	October 6, 2002	Socorro	LINEAR	AEG	7.2 km	MPC · JPL
203817	2002 TC_{236}	—	October 6, 2002	Socorro	LINEAR	·	6.3 km	MPC · JPL
203818	2002 TU_{237}	—	October 6, 2002	Socorro	LINEAR	·	6.9 km	MPC · JPL
203819	2002 TZ_{237}	—	October 7, 2002	Socorro	LINEAR	TIR · slow	4.4 km	MPC · JPL
203820	2002 TU_{261}	—	October 10, 2002	Palomar	NEAT	·	3.1 km	MPC · JPL
203821	2002 TB_{281}	—	October 10, 2002	Socorro	LINEAR	·	6.2 km	MPC · JPL
203822	2002 TB_{291}	—	October 10, 2002	Socorro	LINEAR	·	6.1 km	MPC · JPL
203823 Zdanavičius	2002 TL_{303}	Zdanavičius	October 5, 2002	Palomar	K. Černis	·	3.3 km	MPC · JPL
203824	2002 TG_{335}	—	October 5, 2002	Apache Point	SDSS	·	3.1 km	MPC · JPL
203825	2002 TT_{358}	—	October 10, 2002	Apache Point	SDSS	KOR	1.7 km	MPC · JPL
203826	2002 TH_{382}	—	October 5, 2002	Palomar	NEAT	·	6.6 km	MPC · JPL
203827	2002 UN_{4}	—	October 28, 2002	Socorro	LINEAR	·	9.0 km	MPC · JPL
203828	2002 UJ_{25}	—	October 30, 2002	Haleakala	NEAT	·	4.4 km	MPC · JPL
203829	2002 UD_{29}	—	October 31, 2002	Socorro	LINEAR	·	4.5 km	MPC · JPL
203830	2002 UR_{35}	—	October 31, 2002	Palomar	NEAT	·	3.3 km	MPC · JPL
203831	2002 UY_{37}	—	October 31, 2002	Palomar	NEAT	·	4.1 km	MPC · JPL
203832	2002 UW_{61}	—	October 30, 2002	Apache Point	SDSS	EOS	2.0 km	MPC · JPL
203833	2002 VK_{22}	—	November 5, 2002	Socorro	LINEAR	·	5.5 km	MPC · JPL
203834	2002 VO_{22}	—	November 5, 2002	Socorro	LINEAR	TIR ·	6.5 km	MPC · JPL
203835	2002 VL_{32}	—	November 5, 2002	Socorro	LINEAR	·	5.4 km	MPC · JPL
203836	2002 VZ_{44}	—	November 5, 2002	Anderson Mesa	LONEOS	·	4.6 km	MPC · JPL
203837	2002 VM_{46}	—	November 5, 2002	Palomar	NEAT	·	4.0 km	MPC · JPL
203838	2002 VP_{46}	—	November 5, 2002	Palomar	NEAT	·	2.5 km	MPC · JPL
203839	2002 VP_{53}	—	November 6, 2002	Socorro	LINEAR	·	3.8 km	MPC · JPL
203840	2002 VV_{53}	—	November 6, 2002	Socorro	LINEAR	·	5.7 km	MPC · JPL
203841	2002 VC_{55}	—	November 6, 2002	Socorro	LINEAR	THM	3.6 km	MPC · JPL
203842	2002 VJ_{55}	—	November 6, 2002	Socorro	LINEAR	EOS	4.0 km	MPC · JPL
203843	2002 VF_{56}	—	November 6, 2002	Anderson Mesa	LONEOS	·	4.2 km	MPC · JPL
203844	2002 VW_{61}	—	November 5, 2002	Socorro	LINEAR	·	4.2 km	MPC · JPL
203845	2002 VN_{62}	—	November 5, 2002	Palomar	NEAT	HYG	3.8 km	MPC · JPL
203846	2002 VD_{63}	—	November 6, 2002	Anderson Mesa	LONEOS	·	6.5 km	MPC · JPL
203847	2002 VR_{88}	—	November 11, 2002	Anderson Mesa	LONEOS	·	4.9 km	MPC · JPL
203848	2002 VF_{89}	—	November 11, 2002	Anderson Mesa	LONEOS	·	7.2 km	MPC · JPL
203849	2002 VL_{96}	—	November 11, 2002	Socorro	LINEAR	·	4.9 km	MPC · JPL
203850	2002 VW_{96}	—	November 11, 2002	Palomar	NEAT	·	3.0 km	MPC · JPL
203851	2002 VB_{101}	—	November 11, 2002	Anderson Mesa	LONEOS	EOS	6.1 km	MPC · JPL
203852	2002 VJ_{103}	—	November 12, 2002	Socorro	LINEAR	EOS	3.0 km	MPC · JPL
203853	2002 VK_{112}	—	November 13, 2002	Palomar	NEAT	·	4.1 km	MPC · JPL
203854	2002 VX_{120}	—	November 12, 2002	Palomar	NEAT	·	5.1 km	MPC · JPL
203855	2002 VW_{122}	—	November 13, 2002	Palomar	NEAT	·	4.4 km	MPC · JPL
203856	2002 VB_{124}	—	November 14, 2002	Socorro	LINEAR	·	3.6 km	MPC · JPL
203857	2002 VF_{126}	—	November 12, 2002	Socorro	LINEAR	·	7.0 km	MPC · JPL
203858	2002 VO_{133}	—	November 5, 2002	Socorro	LINEAR	·	5.6 km	MPC · JPL
203859	2002 VC_{141}	—	November 15, 2002	Palomar	NEAT	HYG	3.8 km	MPC · JPL
203860	2002 VM_{141}	—	November 6, 2002	Palomar	NEAT	T_{j} (2.98)	6.4 km	MPC · JPL
203861	2002 WN_{2}	—	November 23, 2002	Palomar	NEAT	·	4.0 km	MPC · JPL
203862	2002 WM_{10}	—	November 24, 2002	Palomar	NEAT	·	5.9 km	MPC · JPL
203863	2002 WV_{11}	—	November 27, 2002	Anderson Mesa	LONEOS	·	5.1 km	MPC · JPL
203864	2002 WK_{18}	—	November 30, 2002	Socorro	LINEAR	EUP	6.5 km	MPC · JPL
203865	2002 WV_{27}	—	November 16, 2002	Palomar	NEAT	L5	11 km	MPC · JPL
203866	2002 XF	—	December 1, 2002	Emerald Lane	L. Ball	·	4.6 km	MPC · JPL
203867	2002 XZ	—	December 1, 2002	Haleakala	NEAT	·	4.8 km	MPC · JPL
203868	2002 XO_{17}	—	December 5, 2002	Socorro	LINEAR	·	7.3 km	MPC · JPL
203869	2002 XZ_{20}	—	December 2, 2002	Socorro	LINEAR	·	4.0 km	MPC · JPL
203870	2002 XF_{21}	—	December 2, 2002	Socorro	LINEAR	EOS	3.8 km	MPC · JPL
203871	2002 XS_{27}	—	December 5, 2002	Socorro	LINEAR	·	4.9 km	MPC · JPL
203872	2002 XP_{39}	—	December 9, 2002	Desert Eagle	W. K. Y. Yeung	·	3.1 km	MPC · JPL
203873	2002 XR_{41}	—	December 6, 2002	Socorro	LINEAR	·	5.3 km	MPC · JPL
203874	2002 XG_{66}	—	December 10, 2002	Socorro	LINEAR	THM	3.7 km	MPC · JPL
203875	2002 XG_{85}	—	December 11, 2002	Socorro	LINEAR	·	5.9 km	MPC · JPL
203876	2002 XY_{96}	—	December 5, 2002	Socorro	LINEAR	·	3.8 km	MPC · JPL
203877	2002 XZ_{99}	—	December 5, 2002	Socorro	LINEAR	THM	3.1 km	MPC · JPL
203878	2002 YQ_{2}	—	December 28, 2002	Nashville	Clingan, R.	·	920 m	MPC · JPL
203879	2002 YN_{30}	—	December 31, 2002	Socorro	LINEAR	THM	3.2 km	MPC · JPL
203880	2003 AH_{7}	—	January 2, 2003	Socorro	LINEAR	·	6.5 km	MPC · JPL
203881	2003 AF_{34}	—	January 7, 2003	Socorro	LINEAR	·	5.3 km	MPC · JPL
203882	2003 AG_{61}	—	January 7, 2003	Socorro	LINEAR	·	5.5 km	MPC · JPL
203883	2003 BM_{16}	—	January 26, 2003	Haleakala	NEAT	VER	4.5 km	MPC · JPL
203884	2003 BA_{26}	—	January 26, 2003	Palomar	NEAT	T_{j} (2.98) · EUP	7.1 km	MPC · JPL
203885	2003 BZ_{61}	—	January 28, 2003	Socorro	LINEAR	·	1.2 km	MPC · JPL
203886	2003 BF_{84}	—	January 31, 2003	Socorro	LINEAR	·	7.8 km	MPC · JPL
203887	2003 DM_{21}	—	February 23, 2003	Anderson Mesa	LONEOS	·	4.4 km	MPC · JPL
203888	2003 ET_{30}	—	March 6, 2003	Palomar	NEAT	·	910 m	MPC · JPL
203889	2003 EH_{50}	—	March 10, 2003	Campo Imperatore	CINEOS	NYS	2.0 km	MPC · JPL
203890	2003 FQ_{25}	—	March 24, 2003	Kitt Peak	Spacewatch	·	1.5 km	MPC · JPL
203891	2003 FR_{43}	—	March 23, 2003	Kitt Peak	Spacewatch	L4	10 km	MPC · JPL
203892	2003 FR_{61}	—	March 26, 2003	Palomar	NEAT	·	1.1 km	MPC · JPL
203893	2003 FX_{66}	—	March 26, 2003	Palomar	NEAT	·	1.7 km	MPC · JPL
203894	2003 FS_{116}	—	March 23, 2003	Kitt Peak	Spacewatch	·	1.7 km	MPC · JPL
203895	2003 FA_{119}	—	March 26, 2003	Anderson Mesa	LONEOS	MAS	1.1 km	MPC · JPL
203896	2003 GE_{51}	—	April 8, 2003	Haleakala	NEAT	NYS	2.0 km	MPC · JPL
203897	2003 HD	—	April 21, 2003	Siding Spring	Siding Spring	·	950 m	MPC · JPL
203898	2003 HH_{12}	—	April 25, 2003	Campo Imperatore	CINEOS	·	2.0 km	MPC · JPL
203899	2003 HW_{21}	—	April 27, 2003	Anderson Mesa	LONEOS	·	1.4 km	MPC · JPL
203900	2003 HE_{22}	—	April 24, 2003	Campo Imperatore	CINEOS	NYS	1.4 km	MPC · JPL

== 203901–204000 ==
back to top

Designation			Discovery			Properties		Ref
Permanent	Provisional	Named after	Date	Site	Discoverer(s)	Category	Diam.	Ref
203901	2003 HR_{24}	—	April 25, 2003	Kitt Peak	Spacewatch	NYS	2.1 km	MPC · JPL
203902	2003 HB_{28}	—	April 26, 2003	Kitt Peak	Spacewatch	·	1.9 km	MPC · JPL
203903	2003 HY_{28}	—	April 28, 2003	Socorro	LINEAR	BAP	1.4 km	MPC · JPL
203904	2003 HE_{29}	—	April 28, 2003	Socorro	LINEAR	·	990 m	MPC · JPL
203905	2003 HJ_{37}	—	April 26, 2003	Haleakala	NEAT	·	2.2 km	MPC · JPL
203906	2003 HQ_{41}	—	April 29, 2003	Haleakala	NEAT	·	1.5 km	MPC · JPL
203907	2003 HS_{48}	—	April 30, 2003	Socorro	LINEAR	·	1.6 km	MPC · JPL
203908	2003 HU_{50}	—	April 28, 2003	Socorro	LINEAR	PHO	3.1 km	MPC · JPL
203909	2003 HK_{51}	—	April 29, 2003	Kitt Peak	Spacewatch	·	1.1 km	MPC · JPL
203910	2003 HC_{53}	—	April 30, 2003	Socorro	LINEAR	·	1.6 km	MPC · JPL
203911	2003 JV_{8}	—	May 2, 2003	Socorro	LINEAR	·	1.5 km	MPC · JPL
203912	2003 JM_{16}	—	May 9, 2003	Socorro	LINEAR	·	1.3 km	MPC · JPL
203913	2003 MC_{1}	—	June 22, 2003	Anderson Mesa	LONEOS	EUN	2.2 km	MPC · JPL
203914	2003 MM_{9}	—	June 28, 2003	Socorro	LINEAR	·	2.3 km	MPC · JPL
203915	2003 OA_{4}	—	July 22, 2003	Campo Imperatore	CINEOS	·	1.8 km	MPC · JPL
203916	2003 OM_{4}	—	July 22, 2003	Haleakala	NEAT	·	1.9 km	MPC · JPL
203917	2003 OK_{6}	—	July 22, 2003	Campo Imperatore	CINEOS	·	4.3 km	MPC · JPL
203918	2003 OR_{7}	—	July 25, 2003	Palomar	NEAT	·	4.2 km	MPC · JPL
203919	2003 OV_{10}	—	July 27, 2003	Reedy Creek	J. Broughton	ERI	2.6 km	MPC · JPL
203920	2003 OH_{13}	—	July 27, 2003	Reedy Creek	J. Broughton	(5)	2.4 km	MPC · JPL
203921	2003 OR_{15}	—	July 23, 2003	Palomar	NEAT	·	3.1 km	MPC · JPL
203922	2003 OH_{17}	—	July 29, 2003	Campo Imperatore	CINEOS	·	1.0 km	MPC · JPL
203923	2003 OP_{20}	—	July 31, 2003	Reedy Creek	J. Broughton	MAS	1.2 km	MPC · JPL
203924	2003 OR_{24}	—	July 24, 2003	Palomar	NEAT	·	2.2 km	MPC · JPL
203925	2003 OK_{27}	—	July 24, 2003	Palomar	NEAT	NYS	1.5 km	MPC · JPL
203926	2003 OX_{30}	—	July 30, 2003	Campo Imperatore	CINEOS	EUN	1.5 km	MPC · JPL
203927	2003 PO_{4}	—	August 3, 2003	Norma Rose	Riffle, J., W. K. Y. Yeung	SUL	2.5 km	MPC · JPL
203928	2003 PG_{8}	—	August 2, 2003	Haleakala	NEAT	·	2.2 km	MPC · JPL
203929	2003 QP_{14}	—	August 20, 2003	Palomar	NEAT	V	1.0 km	MPC · JPL
203930	2003 QG_{18}	—	August 22, 2003	Palomar	NEAT	NYS	2.0 km	MPC · JPL
203931	2003 QZ_{20}	—	August 22, 2003	Palomar	NEAT	·	2.2 km	MPC · JPL
203932	2003 QD_{21}	—	August 22, 2003	Palomar	NEAT	(5)	1.9 km	MPC · JPL
203933	2003 QM_{32}	—	August 21, 2003	Palomar	NEAT	·	1.5 km	MPC · JPL
203934	2003 QT_{37}	—	August 22, 2003	Socorro	LINEAR	JUN	1.5 km	MPC · JPL
203935	2003 QD_{49}	—	August 22, 2003	Palomar	NEAT	·	1.5 km	MPC · JPL
203936	2003 QQ_{49}	—	August 22, 2003	Socorro	LINEAR	(5)	1.3 km	MPC · JPL
203937	2003 QP_{52}	—	August 23, 2003	Socorro	LINEAR	·	3.1 km	MPC · JPL
203938	2003 QN_{69}	—	August 25, 2003	Palomar	NEAT	EUN	2.0 km	MPC · JPL
203939	2003 QV_{73}	—	August 26, 2003	Črni Vrh	Mikuž, H.	NYS	1.5 km	MPC · JPL
203940	2003 QQ_{77}	—	August 24, 2003	Socorro	LINEAR	EUN	2.3 km	MPC · JPL
203941	2003 QK_{78}	—	August 24, 2003	Socorro	LINEAR	·	2.5 km	MPC · JPL
203942	2003 QZ_{88}	—	August 25, 2003	Haleakala	NEAT	·	4.0 km	MPC · JPL
203943	2003 QP_{95}	—	August 30, 2003	Socorro	LINEAR	·	2.5 km	MPC · JPL
203944	2003 QU_{111}	—	August 31, 2003	Haleakala	NEAT	·	1.9 km	MPC · JPL
203945	2003 QN_{114}	—	August 23, 2003	Palomar	NEAT	EUN	1.3 km	MPC · JPL
203946	2003 RA_{8}	—	September 3, 2003	Socorro	LINEAR	·	2.5 km	MPC · JPL
203947	2003 RA_{9}	—	September 1, 2003	Socorro	LINEAR	·	4.3 km	MPC · JPL
203948	2003 RF_{11}	—	September 13, 2003	Haleakala	NEAT	·	3.4 km	MPC · JPL
203949	2003 RS_{13}	—	September 15, 2003	Haleakala	NEAT	·	3.3 km	MPC · JPL
203950	2003 SY_{2}	—	September 16, 2003	Palomar	NEAT	·	4.6 km	MPC · JPL
203951	2003 SU_{6}	—	September 16, 2003	Kitt Peak	Spacewatch	·	1.2 km	MPC · JPL
203952	2003 SF_{15}	—	September 17, 2003	Socorro	LINEAR	MAR	2.1 km	MPC · JPL
203953	2003 SJ_{16}	—	September 17, 2003	Palomar	NEAT	EUN	1.9 km	MPC · JPL
203954	2003 SW_{22}	—	September 16, 2003	Palomar	NEAT	·	1.7 km	MPC · JPL
203955	2003 SH_{31}	—	September 18, 2003	Kitt Peak	Spacewatch	·	2.7 km	MPC · JPL
203956	2003 SX_{63}	—	September 17, 2003	Campo Imperatore	CINEOS	JUN	1.4 km	MPC · JPL
203957	2003 SK_{69}	—	September 17, 2003	Kitt Peak	Spacewatch	·	1.7 km	MPC · JPL
203958	2003 SS_{94}	—	September 19, 2003	Kitt Peak	Spacewatch	·	4.0 km	MPC · JPL
203959	2003 SR_{104}	—	September 20, 2003	Kitt Peak	Spacewatch	·	2.0 km	MPC · JPL
203960	2003 SO_{105}	—	September 20, 2003	Kitt Peak	Spacewatch	·	1.5 km	MPC · JPL
203961	2003 SZ_{111}	—	September 18, 2003	Goodricke-Pigott	R. A. Tucker	·	2.1 km	MPC · JPL
203962	2003 SR_{122}	—	September 18, 2003	Kitt Peak	Spacewatch	·	2.9 km	MPC · JPL
203963	2003 SV_{131}	—	September 18, 2003	Kitt Peak	Spacewatch	·	1.4 km	MPC · JPL
203964	2003 SA_{133}	—	September 19, 2003	Kitt Peak	Spacewatch	·	1.8 km	MPC · JPL
203965	2003 SB_{140}	—	September 18, 2003	Campo Imperatore	CINEOS	WIT	1.5 km	MPC · JPL
203966	2003 SN_{146}	—	September 20, 2003	Palomar	NEAT	·	3.2 km	MPC · JPL
203967	2003 SP_{152}	—	September 19, 2003	Anderson Mesa	LONEOS	·	2.6 km	MPC · JPL
203968	2003 SH_{154}	—	September 19, 2003	Anderson Mesa	LONEOS	·	2.7 km	MPC · JPL
203969	2003 SR_{157}	—	September 19, 2003	Anderson Mesa	LONEOS	·	2.2 km	MPC · JPL
203970	2003 SG_{165}	—	September 20, 2003	Anderson Mesa	LONEOS	·	2.9 km	MPC · JPL
203971	2003 SP_{171}	—	September 18, 2003	Kitt Peak	Spacewatch	·	2.9 km	MPC · JPL
203972	2003 SW_{176}	—	September 18, 2003	Palomar	NEAT	(5)	1.3 km	MPC · JPL
203973	2003 SR_{193}	—	September 20, 2003	Kitt Peak	Spacewatch	·	2.9 km	MPC · JPL
203974	2003 SM_{200}	—	September 25, 2003	Palomar	NEAT	MAR	1.8 km	MPC · JPL
203975	2003 SL_{206}	—	September 24, 2003	Palomar	NEAT	·	2.1 km	MPC · JPL
203976	2003 SR_{208}	—	September 23, 2003	Palomar	NEAT	·	1.8 km	MPC · JPL
203977	2003 SC_{212}	—	September 25, 2003	Palomar	NEAT	·	2.5 km	MPC · JPL
203978	2003 SV_{218}	—	September 28, 2003	Desert Eagle	W. K. Y. Yeung	·	3.8 km	MPC · JPL
203979	2003 SG_{232}	—	September 24, 2003	Haleakala	NEAT	·	3.2 km	MPC · JPL
203980	2003 SH_{232}	—	September 24, 2003	Haleakala	NEAT	MRX	1.8 km	MPC · JPL
203981	2003 SP_{233}	—	September 25, 2003	Palomar	NEAT	(5)	1.5 km	MPC · JPL
203982	2003 SK_{235}	—	September 27, 2003	Socorro	LINEAR	MAR ·	1.7 km	MPC · JPL
203983	2003 SE_{240}	—	September 27, 2003	Socorro	LINEAR	·	2.2 km	MPC · JPL
203984	2003 SK_{246}	—	September 26, 2003	Socorro	LINEAR	DOR	3.7 km	MPC · JPL
203985	2003 SG_{261}	—	September 27, 2003	Socorro	LINEAR	·	2.1 km	MPC · JPL
203986	2003 SW_{264}	—	September 28, 2003	Socorro	LINEAR	KOR	2.3 km	MPC · JPL
203987	2003 SN_{265}	—	September 29, 2003	Kitt Peak	Spacewatch	·	1.6 km	MPC · JPL
203988	2003 SD_{293}	—	September 27, 2003	Socorro	LINEAR	·	2.0 km	MPC · JPL
203989	2003 SV_{302}	—	September 17, 2003	Palomar	NEAT	·	2.4 km	MPC · JPL
203990	2003 SB_{306}	—	September 30, 2003	Socorro	LINEAR	BRA	3.3 km	MPC · JPL
203991	2003 SN_{319}	—	September 22, 2003	Anderson Mesa	LONEOS	(5)	1.3 km	MPC · JPL
203992	2003 SR_{319}	—	September 28, 2003	Socorro	LINEAR	·	3.0 km	MPC · JPL
203993	2003 SF_{323}	—	September 16, 2003	Kitt Peak	Spacewatch	·	2.0 km	MPC · JPL
203994	2003 TL_{2}	—	October 1, 2003	Goodricke-Pigott	Kessel, J. W.	·	4.5 km	MPC · JPL
203995	2003 TO_{12}	—	October 14, 2003	Anderson Mesa	LONEOS	DOR	3.2 km	MPC · JPL
203996	2003 TX_{16}	—	October 14, 2003	Anderson Mesa	LONEOS	·	2.7 km	MPC · JPL
203997	2003 TT_{19}	—	October 15, 2003	Anderson Mesa	LONEOS	·	2.5 km	MPC · JPL
203998	2003 TB_{20}	—	October 14, 2003	Palomar	NEAT	·	4.4 km	MPC · JPL
203999	2003 TZ_{20}	—	October 15, 2003	Anderson Mesa	LONEOS	MRX	1.7 km	MPC · JPL
204000	2003 TY_{27}	—	October 1, 2003	Kitt Peak	Spacewatch	·	1.5 km	MPC · JPL

back to top

== See also ==
- Meanings of minor-planet names: 203001–204000
