= Michael Blanton =

American physicist

Michael R. Blanton (born 1 February 1973) is an American physicist whose expertise is in the fields of galaxy evolution and cosmology. A professor in New York University's department of physics, Blanton has primarily focused on mapping the Universe.

== Career ==
A former postdoctoral fellow at Fermilab, he was part of a team that constructed the largest-ever three-dimensional map, produced by the Sloan Digital Sky Survey, of massive galaxies and distant black holes using data from the Sloan Foundation Telescope at Apache Point Observatory in New Mexico. His work with the survey concentrated on the properties of galaxies and how the galaxies that exist in massive "clusters" of galaxies differ from those that are isolated from their neighbors. The SDSS map helps the investigation of the mysterious "dark matter" and "dark energy" that make up 96 percent of the universe—and allow scientists to retrace the history of the universe over the last 11 billion years.

Blanton has also helped to develop a new prism spectroscopy technique to obtain large numbers of redshifts of very distant galaxies to determine how galaxies have changed over the past eight billion years. The work was completed as part of the multi-institutional PRIMUS project.

Blanton directs Sloan Digital Sky Survey IV, which will create a comprehensive spectroscopic map of the Milky Way, provide spatially resolved spectroscopy for 10,000 nearby galaxies, and create the largest volume map of the distant universe ever made.

In December 2025 he was appointed director of Carnegie Institution for Science Observatories.

== Honors ==
Asteroid 140980 Blanton, discovered by the Sloan Digital Sky Survey at Apache Point Observatory in 2001, was named in his honor. The official naming citation was published by the Minor Planet Center on 6 April 2012 (M.P.C. 79105).
