= Meanings of minor-planet names: 140001–141000 =

As minor planet discoveries are confirmed, they are given a permanent number by the IAU's Minor Planet Center (MPC), and the discoverers can then submit names for them, following the IAU's naming conventions. The list below concerns those minor planets in the specified number-range that have received names, and explains the meanings of those names.

Official naming citations of newly named small Solar System bodies are approved and published in a bulletin by IAU's Working Group for Small Bodies Nomenclature (WGSBN). Before May 2021, citations were published in MPC's Minor Planet Circulars for many decades. Recent citations can also be found on the JPL Small-Body Database (SBDB). Until his death in 2016, German astronomer Lutz D. Schmadel compiled these citations into the Dictionary of Minor Planet Names (DMP) and regularly updated the collection.

Based on Paul Herget's The Names of the Minor Planets, Schmadel also researched the unclear origin of numerous asteroids, most of which had been named prior to World War II. This article incorporates text from this source, which is in the public domain: SBDB New namings may only be added to this list below after official publication as the preannouncement of names is condemned. The WGSBN publishes a comprehensive guideline for the naming rules of non-cometary small Solar System bodies.

== 140001–140100 ==
Named minor planet	Provisional	This minor planet was named for...	Ref · Catalog
140038 Kurushima	2001 SN_{73}	Kurushima Kaikyo is a 4-kilometer-wide strait between the islands of Shikoku and Oshima, Japan	JPL · 140038

== 140101–140200 ==
back to top

Named minor planet	Provisional	This minor planet was named for...	Ref · Catalog
There are no named minor planets in this number range

== 140201–140300 ==
back to top

Named minor planet	Provisional	This minor planet was named for...	Ref · Catalog
There are no named minor planets in this number range

== 140301–140400 ==
back to top

Named minor planet	Provisional	This minor planet was named for...	Ref · Catalog
There are no named minor planets in this number range

== 140401–140500 ==
back to top

Named minor planet	Provisional	This minor planet was named for...	Ref · Catalog
There are no named minor planets in this number range

== 140501–140600 ==
back to top

Named minor planet	Provisional	This minor planet was named for...	Ref · Catalog
There are no named minor planets in this number range

== 140601–140700 ==
back to top

Named minor planet	Provisional	This minor planet was named for...	Ref · Catalog
140602 Berlind	2001 TU_{247}	Andreas Berlind (born 1972), American astronomer with the Sloan Digital Sky Survey	JPL · 140602
140620 Raoulwallenberg	2001 UN_{10}	Raoul Wallenberg (1912–1947), Swedish humanitarian who saved tens of thousands of Jewish lives in Hungary during World War II	JPL · 140620
140628 Klaipeda	2001 UM_{14}	The city of Klaipėda in Lithuania. Founded in 1252 and known by its old German name "Memel", it is the country's third largest city.	JPL · 140628

== 140701–140800 ==
back to top

Named minor planet	Provisional	This minor planet was named for...	Ref · Catalog
There are no named minor planets in this number range

== 140801–140900 ==
back to top

Named minor planet	Provisional	This minor planet was named for...	Ref · Catalog
There are no named minor planets in this number range

== 140901–141000 ==
back to top

Named minor planet	Provisional	This minor planet was named for...	Ref · Catalog
140980 Blanton	2001 VQ_{132}	Michael Blanton (born 1973), American cosmologist with the Sloan Digital Sky Survey	JPL · 140980

back to top

Preceded by 139,001–140,000	Meanings of minor-planet names List of minor planets: 140,001–141,000	Succeeded by 141,001–142,000
