= List of minor planets: 140001–141000 =

The following is a partial list of minor planets, running from minor-planet number 140001 through 141000, inclusive. The primary data for this and other partial lists is based on JPL's "Small-Body Orbital Elements" and data available from the Minor Planet Center. Critical list information is also provided by the MPC, unless otherwise specified from Lowell Observatory. A detailed description of the table's columns and additional sources are given on the main page including a complete list of every page in this series, and a statistical break-up on the dynamical classification of minor planets.

Also see the summary list of all named bodies in numerical and alphabetical order, and the corresponding naming citations for the number range of this particular list. New namings may only be added to this list after official publication, as the preannouncement of names is condemned by the Working Group for Small Bodies Nomenclature of the International Astronomical Union.

Near-Earth obj.	MBA (inner)	MBA (outer)	Centaur
Mars-crosser	MBA (middle)	Jupiter trojan	Trans-Neptunian obj.
Unclassified

== 140001–140100 ==
Designation			Discovery			Properties		Ref
Permanent	Provisional	Named after	Date	Site	Discoverer(s)	Category	Diam.	Ref
140001	2001 SO_{41}	—	September 16, 2001	Socorro	LINEAR	EOS	2.7 km	MPC · JPL
140002	2001 SF_{42}	—	September 16, 2001	Socorro	LINEAR	·	3.8 km	MPC · JPL
140003	2001 SM_{42}	—	September 16, 2001	Socorro	LINEAR	·	4.0 km	MPC · JPL
140004	2001 SN_{42}	—	September 16, 2001	Socorro	LINEAR	·	3.5 km	MPC · JPL
140005	2001 SR_{42}	—	September 16, 2001	Socorro	LINEAR	KOR	2.1 km	MPC · JPL
140006	2001 SE_{43}	—	September 16, 2001	Socorro	LINEAR	·	8.7 km	MPC · JPL
140007	2001 SG_{43}	—	September 16, 2001	Socorro	LINEAR	·	5.4 km	MPC · JPL
140008	2001 SS_{43}	—	September 16, 2001	Socorro	LINEAR	MAS	1.4 km	MPC · JPL
140009	2001 SU_{44}	—	September 16, 2001	Socorro	LINEAR	NYS	1.7 km	MPC · JPL
140010	2001 SA_{45}	—	September 16, 2001	Socorro	LINEAR	·	2.9 km	MPC · JPL
140011	2001 SA_{46}	—	September 16, 2001	Socorro	LINEAR	TEL	2.9 km	MPC · JPL
140012	2001 SG_{47}	—	September 16, 2001	Socorro	LINEAR	·	2.8 km	MPC · JPL
140013	2001 SA_{49}	—	September 16, 2001	Socorro	LINEAR	EOS	3.8 km	MPC · JPL
140014	2001 SG_{49}	—	September 16, 2001	Socorro	LINEAR	KOR	2.3 km	MPC · JPL
140015	2001 SE_{50}	—	September 16, 2001	Socorro	LINEAR	·	5.7 km	MPC · JPL
140016	2001 SL_{50}	—	September 16, 2001	Socorro	LINEAR	·	3.3 km	MPC · JPL
140017	2001 SE_{51}	—	September 16, 2001	Socorro	LINEAR	·	2.7 km	MPC · JPL
140018	2001 ST_{51}	—	September 16, 2001	Socorro	LINEAR	·	5.3 km	MPC · JPL
140019	2001 SO_{52}	—	September 16, 2001	Socorro	LINEAR	·	6.0 km	MPC · JPL
140020	2001 SQ_{52}	—	September 16, 2001	Socorro	LINEAR	·	3.6 km	MPC · JPL
140021	2001 SW_{52}	—	September 16, 2001	Socorro	LINEAR	·	4.4 km	MPC · JPL
140022	2001 SH_{53}	—	September 16, 2001	Socorro	LINEAR	·	2.5 km	MPC · JPL
140023	2001 SL_{54}	—	September 16, 2001	Socorro	LINEAR	EOS	4.4 km	MPC · JPL
140024	2001 SC_{57}	—	September 16, 2001	Socorro	LINEAR	EOS	6.3 km	MPC · JPL
140025	2001 SD_{57}	—	September 16, 2001	Socorro	LINEAR	EOS ·	4.5 km	MPC · JPL
140026	2001 SK_{58}	—	September 17, 2001	Socorro	LINEAR	·	2.1 km	MPC · JPL
140027	2001 SU_{59}	—	September 17, 2001	Socorro	LINEAR	·	9.2 km	MPC · JPL
140028	2001 SZ_{61}	—	September 17, 2001	Socorro	LINEAR	EOS	3.3 km	MPC · JPL
140029	2001 SV_{63}	—	September 17, 2001	Socorro	LINEAR	·	3.0 km	MPC · JPL
140030	2001 SA_{64}	—	September 17, 2001	Socorro	LINEAR	·	3.6 km	MPC · JPL
140031	2001 SP_{64}	—	September 17, 2001	Socorro	LINEAR	·	4.6 km	MPC · JPL
140032	2001 SM_{65}	—	September 17, 2001	Socorro	LINEAR	·	4.4 km	MPC · JPL
140033	2001 SK_{66}	—	September 17, 2001	Socorro	LINEAR	·	5.9 km	MPC · JPL
140034	2001 SO_{66}	—	September 17, 2001	Socorro	LINEAR	·	3.0 km	MPC · JPL
140035	2001 SO_{67}	—	September 17, 2001	Socorro	LINEAR	·	1.6 km	MPC · JPL
140036	2001 SB_{71}	—	September 17, 2001	Socorro	LINEAR	GEF	3.6 km	MPC · JPL
140037	2001 SA_{72}	—	September 17, 2001	Socorro	LINEAR	·	4.6 km	MPC · JPL
140038 Kurushima	2001 SN_{73}	Kurushima	September 18, 2001	Kuma Kogen	A. Nakamura	·	3.3 km	MPC · JPL
140039	2001 SO_{73}	—	September 19, 2001	Kitt Peak	Spacewatch	APO +1km · PHA	860 m	MPC · JPL
140040	2001 SA_{76}	—	September 19, 2001	Anderson Mesa	LONEOS	·	3.7 km	MPC · JPL
140041	2001 SZ_{77}	—	September 19, 2001	Socorro	LINEAR	KOR	2.0 km	MPC · JPL
140042	2001 SV_{78}	—	September 19, 2001	Socorro	LINEAR	·	3.0 km	MPC · JPL
140043	2001 SE_{80}	—	September 20, 2001	Socorro	LINEAR	BRA	2.7 km	MPC · JPL
140044	2001 SJ_{80}	—	September 20, 2001	Socorro	LINEAR	·	2.9 km	MPC · JPL
140045	2001 SZ_{80}	—	September 20, 2001	Socorro	LINEAR	·	3.9 km	MPC · JPL
140046	2001 SQ_{81}	—	September 20, 2001	Socorro	LINEAR	EOS	3.4 km	MPC · JPL
140047	2001 SR_{83}	—	September 20, 2001	Socorro	LINEAR	·	2.0 km	MPC · JPL
140048	2001 SF_{84}	—	September 20, 2001	Socorro	LINEAR	·	6.3 km	MPC · JPL
140049	2001 SW_{85}	—	September 20, 2001	Socorro	LINEAR	·	2.5 km	MPC · JPL
140050	2001 SN_{86}	—	September 20, 2001	Socorro	LINEAR	·	2.7 km	MPC · JPL
140051	2001 SJ_{90}	—	September 20, 2001	Socorro	LINEAR	·	3.6 km	MPC · JPL
140052	2001 SS_{91}	—	September 20, 2001	Socorro	LINEAR	·	4.5 km	MPC · JPL
140053	2001 SU_{95}	—	September 20, 2001	Socorro	LINEAR	KOR	1.9 km	MPC · JPL
140054	2001 SV_{95}	—	September 20, 2001	Socorro	LINEAR	(31811)	4.6 km	MPC · JPL
140055	2001 SU_{96}	—	September 20, 2001	Socorro	LINEAR	·	3.2 km	MPC · JPL
140056	2001 SY_{96}	—	September 20, 2001	Socorro	LINEAR	·	4.4 km	MPC · JPL
140057	2001 SR_{98}	—	September 20, 2001	Socorro	LINEAR	·	1.9 km	MPC · JPL
140058	2001 SA_{101}	—	September 20, 2001	Socorro	LINEAR	·	3.5 km	MPC · JPL
140059	2001 SZ_{101}	—	September 20, 2001	Socorro	LINEAR	·	3.0 km	MPC · JPL
140060	2001 SD_{102}	—	September 20, 2001	Socorro	LINEAR	EOS	3.5 km	MPC · JPL
140061	2001 SO_{102}	—	September 20, 2001	Socorro	LINEAR	WIT	1.4 km	MPC · JPL
140062	2001 SU_{103}	—	September 20, 2001	Socorro	LINEAR	·	4.9 km	MPC · JPL
140063	2001 SB_{105}	—	September 20, 2001	Socorro	LINEAR	·	5.8 km	MPC · JPL
140064	2001 SG_{105}	—	September 20, 2001	Socorro	LINEAR	·	3.7 km	MPC · JPL
140065	2001 SZ_{105}	—	September 20, 2001	Socorro	LINEAR	·	4.0 km	MPC · JPL
140066	2001 SR_{108}	—	September 20, 2001	Socorro	LINEAR	·	7.9 km	MPC · JPL
140067	2001 SA_{111}	—	September 20, 2001	Socorro	LINEAR	THB	7.7 km	MPC · JPL
140068	2001 SK_{111}	—	September 20, 2001	Socorro	LINEAR	(895)	10 km	MPC · JPL
140069	2001 SO_{111}	—	September 20, 2001	Socorro	LINEAR	·	4.8 km	MPC · JPL
140070	2001 SY_{111}	—	September 20, 2001	Socorro	LINEAR	LIX	8.1 km	MPC · JPL
140071	2001 SX_{113}	—	September 20, 2001	Desert Eagle	W. K. Y. Yeung	·	2.6 km	MPC · JPL
140072	2001 SP_{114}	—	September 20, 2001	Desert Eagle	W. K. Y. Yeung	·	6.9 km	MPC · JPL
140073	2001 SC_{115}	—	September 20, 2001	Desert Eagle	W. K. Y. Yeung	·	3.4 km	MPC · JPL
140074	2001 SM_{117}	—	September 16, 2001	Socorro	LINEAR	·	2.5 km	MPC · JPL
140075	2001 SH_{118}	—	September 16, 2001	Socorro	LINEAR	EOS	2.7 km	MPC · JPL
140076	2001 SR_{118}	—	September 16, 2001	Socorro	LINEAR	NEM	3.2 km	MPC · JPL
140077	2001 SO_{119}	—	September 16, 2001	Socorro	LINEAR	EOS	3.4 km	MPC · JPL
140078	2001 SU_{119}	—	September 16, 2001	Socorro	LINEAR	·	4.2 km	MPC · JPL
140079	2001 SY_{119}	—	September 16, 2001	Socorro	LINEAR	·	3.7 km	MPC · JPL
140080	2001 SA_{120}	—	September 16, 2001	Socorro	LINEAR	·	4.1 km	MPC · JPL
140081	2001 SB_{120}	—	September 16, 2001	Socorro	LINEAR	·	2.6 km	MPC · JPL
140082	2001 SO_{120}	—	September 16, 2001	Socorro	LINEAR	·	2.8 km	MPC · JPL
140083	2001 SR_{120}	—	September 16, 2001	Socorro	LINEAR	AGN	2.1 km	MPC · JPL
140084	2001 ST_{121}	—	September 16, 2001	Socorro	LINEAR	·	2.5 km	MPC · JPL
140085	2001 SZ_{121}	—	September 16, 2001	Socorro	LINEAR	·	7.5 km	MPC · JPL
140086	2001 SD_{122}	—	September 16, 2001	Socorro	LINEAR	HOF	3.6 km	MPC · JPL
140087	2001 SM_{123}	—	September 16, 2001	Socorro	LINEAR	EOS	4.1 km	MPC · JPL
140088	2001 SQ_{124}	—	September 16, 2001	Socorro	LINEAR	·	3.6 km	MPC · JPL
140089	2001 SG_{127}	—	September 16, 2001	Socorro	LINEAR	·	5.9 km	MPC · JPL
140090	2001 SL_{127}	—	September 16, 2001	Socorro	LINEAR	KOR	2.2 km	MPC · JPL
140091	2001 SN_{128}	—	September 16, 2001	Socorro	LINEAR	EOS	3.5 km	MPC · JPL
140092	2001 SR_{128}	—	September 16, 2001	Socorro	LINEAR	·	5.5 km	MPC · JPL
140093	2001 SE_{129}	—	September 16, 2001	Socorro	LINEAR	·	4.9 km	MPC · JPL
140094	2001 SH_{129}	—	September 16, 2001	Socorro	LINEAR	·	4.4 km	MPC · JPL
140095	2001 SO_{129}	—	September 16, 2001	Socorro	LINEAR	526	4.5 km	MPC · JPL
140096	2001 SQ_{129}	—	September 16, 2001	Socorro	LINEAR	·	2.1 km	MPC · JPL
140097	2001 SL_{130}	—	September 16, 2001	Socorro	LINEAR	·	3.2 km	MPC · JPL
140098	2001 SP_{130}	—	September 16, 2001	Socorro	LINEAR	EOS	3.2 km	MPC · JPL
140099	2001 SE_{131}	—	September 16, 2001	Socorro	LINEAR	·	2.4 km	MPC · JPL
140100	2001 ST_{131}	—	September 16, 2001	Socorro	LINEAR	·	4.8 km	MPC · JPL

== 140101–140200 ==
back to top

Designation			Discovery			Properties		Ref
Permanent	Provisional	Named after	Date	Site	Discoverer(s)	Category	Diam.	Ref
140101	2001 SV_{131}	—	September 16, 2001	Socorro	LINEAR	·	2.3 km	MPC · JPL
140102	2001 SB_{132}	—	September 16, 2001	Socorro	LINEAR	·	2.7 km	MPC · JPL
140103	2001 SH_{132}	—	September 16, 2001	Socorro	LINEAR	·	3.6 km	MPC · JPL
140104	2001 SW_{132}	—	September 16, 2001	Socorro	LINEAR	·	5.9 km	MPC · JPL
140105	2001 SN_{133}	—	September 16, 2001	Socorro	LINEAR	·	3.2 km	MPC · JPL
140106	2001 SV_{133}	—	September 16, 2001	Socorro	LINEAR	·	6.2 km	MPC · JPL
140107	2001 SZ_{133}	—	September 16, 2001	Socorro	LINEAR	·	3.2 km	MPC · JPL
140108	2001 SA_{135}	—	September 16, 2001	Socorro	LINEAR	·	3.7 km	MPC · JPL
140109	2001 SE_{135}	—	September 16, 2001	Socorro	LINEAR	LIX	8.2 km	MPC · JPL
140110	2001 SD_{136}	—	September 16, 2001	Socorro	LINEAR	·	4.3 km	MPC · JPL
140111	2001 SN_{136}	—	September 16, 2001	Socorro	LINEAR	·	3.2 km	MPC · JPL
140112	2001 SK_{137}	—	September 16, 2001	Socorro	LINEAR	KOR	2.6 km	MPC · JPL
140113	2001 SM_{137}	—	September 16, 2001	Socorro	LINEAR	·	6.3 km	MPC · JPL
140114	2001 SO_{137}	—	September 16, 2001	Socorro	LINEAR	KOR	2.3 km	MPC · JPL
140115	2001 ST_{137}	—	September 16, 2001	Socorro	LINEAR	KOR	2.3 km	MPC · JPL
140116	2001 SX_{137}	—	September 16, 2001	Socorro	LINEAR	·	2.0 km	MPC · JPL
140117	2001 SD_{138}	—	September 16, 2001	Socorro	LINEAR	·	4.4 km	MPC · JPL
140118	2001 SR_{138}	—	September 16, 2001	Socorro	LINEAR	·	3.0 km	MPC · JPL
140119	2001 SV_{138}	—	September 16, 2001	Socorro	LINEAR	·	3.0 km	MPC · JPL
140120	2001 SB_{139}	—	September 16, 2001	Socorro	LINEAR	·	3.0 km	MPC · JPL
140121	2001 SR_{139}	—	September 16, 2001	Socorro	LINEAR	KOR	2.5 km	MPC · JPL
140122	2001 SG_{140}	—	September 16, 2001	Socorro	LINEAR	EOS	3.2 km	MPC · JPL
140123	2001 SN_{140}	—	September 16, 2001	Socorro	LINEAR	·	2.6 km	MPC · JPL
140124	2001 SA_{141}	—	September 16, 2001	Socorro	LINEAR	AGN	1.6 km	MPC · JPL
140125	2001 SD_{141}	—	September 16, 2001	Socorro	LINEAR	KOR	2.2 km	MPC · JPL
140126	2001 SV_{141}	—	September 16, 2001	Socorro	LINEAR	·	2.1 km	MPC · JPL
140127	2001 SW_{141}	—	September 16, 2001	Socorro	LINEAR	·	3.4 km	MPC · JPL
140128	2001 SZ_{141}	—	September 16, 2001	Socorro	LINEAR	AGN	2.2 km	MPC · JPL
140129	2001 SG_{143}	—	September 16, 2001	Socorro	LINEAR	·	7.3 km	MPC · JPL
140130	2001 SD_{144}	—	September 16, 2001	Socorro	LINEAR	·	1.6 km	MPC · JPL
140131	2001 SB_{145}	—	September 16, 2001	Socorro	LINEAR	EOS	2.7 km	MPC · JPL
140132	2001 SZ_{145}	—	September 16, 2001	Socorro	LINEAR	·	3.0 km	MPC · JPL
140133	2001 ST_{146}	—	September 16, 2001	Socorro	LINEAR	·	2.9 km	MPC · JPL
140134	2001 SS_{148}	—	September 17, 2001	Socorro	LINEAR	·	3.1 km	MPC · JPL
140135	2001 SH_{149}	—	September 17, 2001	Socorro	LINEAR	·	4.2 km	MPC · JPL
140136	2001 SQ_{151}	—	September 17, 2001	Socorro	LINEAR	slow	8.7 km	MPC · JPL
140137	2001 SR_{151}	—	September 17, 2001	Socorro	LINEAR	EOS	4.1 km	MPC · JPL
140138	2001 SE_{152}	—	September 17, 2001	Socorro	LINEAR	·	3.2 km	MPC · JPL
140139	2001 SS_{154}	—	September 17, 2001	Socorro	LINEAR	·	2.7 km	MPC · JPL
140140	2001 ST_{154}	—	September 17, 2001	Socorro	LINEAR	·	2.4 km	MPC · JPL
140141	2001 SE_{155}	—	September 17, 2001	Socorro	LINEAR	KOR	2.9 km	MPC · JPL
140142	2001 SH_{155}	—	September 17, 2001	Socorro	LINEAR	·	6.3 km	MPC · JPL
140143	2001 SF_{159}	—	September 17, 2001	Socorro	LINEAR	·	4.1 km	MPC · JPL
140144	2001 SM_{159}	—	September 17, 2001	Socorro	LINEAR	·	3.2 km	MPC · JPL
140145	2001 SS_{160}	—	September 17, 2001	Socorro	LINEAR	·	5.1 km	MPC · JPL
140146	2001 SX_{160}	—	September 17, 2001	Socorro	LINEAR	·	4.2 km	MPC · JPL
140147	2001 SZ_{160}	—	September 17, 2001	Socorro	LINEAR	EOS	3.0 km	MPC · JPL
140148	2001 SA_{161}	—	September 17, 2001	Socorro	LINEAR	EOS	4.4 km	MPC · JPL
140149	2001 SZ_{162}	—	September 17, 2001	Socorro	LINEAR	KOR	3.5 km	MPC · JPL
140150	2001 SC_{163}	—	September 17, 2001	Socorro	LINEAR	·	4.0 km	MPC · JPL
140151	2001 SS_{164}	—	September 17, 2001	Socorro	LINEAR	EOS	6.3 km	MPC · JPL
140152	2001 SS_{165}	—	September 19, 2001	Socorro	LINEAR	·	4.2 km	MPC · JPL
140153	2001 SX_{166}	—	September 19, 2001	Socorro	LINEAR	KOR	1.9 km	MPC · JPL
140154	2001 SC_{168}	—	September 19, 2001	Socorro	LINEAR	·	4.5 km	MPC · JPL
140155	2001 SE_{168}	—	September 19, 2001	Socorro	LINEAR	KOR	2.4 km	MPC · JPL
140156	2001 SH_{168}	—	September 19, 2001	Socorro	LINEAR	EOS	3.3 km	MPC · JPL
140157	2001 SH_{169}	—	September 19, 2001	Socorro	LINEAR	KOR	2.3 km	MPC · JPL
140158	2001 SX_{169}	—	September 19, 2001	Socorro	LINEAR	APO · PHA	570 m	MPC · JPL
140159	2001 SK_{171}	—	September 16, 2001	Socorro	LINEAR	·	2.4 km	MPC · JPL
140160	2001 SY_{173}	—	September 16, 2001	Socorro	LINEAR	·	2.5 km	MPC · JPL
140161	2001 SE_{175}	—	September 16, 2001	Socorro	LINEAR	·	2.5 km	MPC · JPL
140162	2001 SP_{176}	—	September 16, 2001	Socorro	LINEAR	·	4.2 km	MPC · JPL
140163	2001 SM_{177}	—	September 16, 2001	Socorro	LINEAR	HOF	4.0 km	MPC · JPL
140164	2001 SX_{177}	—	September 16, 2001	Socorro	LINEAR	·	7.1 km	MPC · JPL
140165	2001 SN_{178}	—	September 17, 2001	Socorro	LINEAR	·	3.1 km	MPC · JPL
140166	2001 SV_{178}	—	September 17, 2001	Socorro	LINEAR	·	5.7 km	MPC · JPL
140167	2001 SA_{179}	—	September 17, 2001	Socorro	LINEAR	·	4.7 km	MPC · JPL
140168	2001 SC_{179}	—	September 17, 2001	Socorro	LINEAR	·	7.6 km	MPC · JPL
140169	2001 SU_{181}	—	September 19, 2001	Socorro	LINEAR	·	1.5 km	MPC · JPL
140170	2001 SL_{182}	—	September 19, 2001	Socorro	LINEAR	·	3.7 km	MPC · JPL
140171	2001 SS_{184}	—	September 19, 2001	Socorro	LINEAR	·	2.5 km	MPC · JPL
140172	2001 SX_{184}	—	September 19, 2001	Socorro	LINEAR	·	4.1 km	MPC · JPL
140173	2001 SY_{187}	—	September 19, 2001	Socorro	LINEAR	·	2.6 km	MPC · JPL
140174	2001 SK_{188}	—	September 19, 2001	Socorro	LINEAR	·	2.6 km	MPC · JPL
140175	2001 SW_{189}	—	September 19, 2001	Socorro	LINEAR	·	2.2 km	MPC · JPL
140176	2001 SA_{192}	—	September 19, 2001	Socorro	LINEAR	EOS	2.9 km	MPC · JPL
140177	2001 SC_{192}	—	September 19, 2001	Socorro	LINEAR	·	3.2 km	MPC · JPL
140178	2001 SM_{195}	—	September 19, 2001	Socorro	LINEAR	·	2.6 km	MPC · JPL
140179	2001 SK_{196}	—	September 19, 2001	Socorro	LINEAR	KOR	2.5 km	MPC · JPL
140180	2001 ST_{200}	—	September 19, 2001	Socorro	LINEAR	·	6.2 km	MPC · JPL
140181	2001 SZ_{201}	—	September 19, 2001	Socorro	LINEAR	·	3.1 km	MPC · JPL
140182	2001 SO_{205}	—	September 19, 2001	Socorro	LINEAR	·	2.3 km	MPC · JPL
140183	2001 SP_{205}	—	September 19, 2001	Socorro	LINEAR	HOF	5.7 km	MPC · JPL
140184	2001 SO_{206}	—	September 19, 2001	Socorro	LINEAR	·	3.1 km	MPC · JPL
140185	2001 SV_{206}	—	September 19, 2001	Socorro	LINEAR	·	4.3 km	MPC · JPL
140186	2001 SZ_{206}	—	September 19, 2001	Socorro	LINEAR	KOR	2.2 km	MPC · JPL
140187	2001 SF_{211}	—	September 19, 2001	Socorro	LINEAR	·	4.1 km	MPC · JPL
140188	2001 SJ_{211}	—	September 19, 2001	Socorro	LINEAR	V	1.1 km	MPC · JPL
140189	2001 SC_{213}	—	September 19, 2001	Socorro	LINEAR	·	3.3 km	MPC · JPL
140190	2001 SJ_{214}	—	September 19, 2001	Socorro	LINEAR	·	2.7 km	MPC · JPL
140191	2001 ST_{214}	—	September 19, 2001	Socorro	LINEAR	·	2.8 km	MPC · JPL
140192	2001 SM_{215}	—	September 19, 2001	Socorro	LINEAR	·	4.0 km	MPC · JPL
140193	2001 SE_{218}	—	September 19, 2001	Socorro	LINEAR	AGN	1.8 km	MPC · JPL
140194	2001 SO_{218}	—	September 19, 2001	Socorro	LINEAR	·	2.8 km	MPC · JPL
140195	2001 SE_{219}	—	September 19, 2001	Socorro	LINEAR	·	3.6 km	MPC · JPL
140196	2001 SM_{219}	—	September 19, 2001	Socorro	LINEAR	·	2.7 km	MPC · JPL
140197	2001 SC_{220}	—	September 19, 2001	Socorro	LINEAR	·	3.0 km	MPC · JPL
140198	2001 SH_{221}	—	September 19, 2001	Socorro	LINEAR	·	3.7 km	MPC · JPL
140199	2001 SV_{222}	—	September 19, 2001	Socorro	LINEAR	TEL	2.0 km	MPC · JPL
140200	2001 SS_{223}	—	September 19, 2001	Socorro	LINEAR	·	2.8 km	MPC · JPL

== 140201–140300 ==
back to top

Designation			Discovery			Properties		Ref
Permanent	Provisional	Named after	Date	Site	Discoverer(s)	Category	Diam.	Ref
140201	2001 SP_{224}	—	September 19, 2001	Socorro	LINEAR	·	3.4 km	MPC · JPL
140202	2001 SU_{224}	—	September 19, 2001	Socorro	LINEAR	·	3.4 km	MPC · JPL
140203	2001 SC_{226}	—	September 19, 2001	Socorro	LINEAR	NYS	2.0 km	MPC · JPL
140204	2001 SE_{226}	—	September 19, 2001	Socorro	LINEAR	·	3.5 km	MPC · JPL
140205	2001 SQ_{226}	—	September 19, 2001	Socorro	LINEAR	·	2.6 km	MPC · JPL
140206	2001 SB_{228}	—	September 19, 2001	Socorro	LINEAR	·	1.4 km	MPC · JPL
140207	2001 SC_{228}	—	September 19, 2001	Socorro	LINEAR	KOR	2.3 km	MPC · JPL
140208	2001 SV_{228}	—	September 19, 2001	Socorro	LINEAR	·	2.4 km	MPC · JPL
140209	2001 SC_{230}	—	September 19, 2001	Socorro	LINEAR	·	1.7 km	MPC · JPL
140210	2001 SU_{230}	—	September 19, 2001	Socorro	LINEAR	·	3.1 km	MPC · JPL
140211	2001 SZ_{230}	—	September 19, 2001	Socorro	LINEAR	KOR	2.6 km	MPC · JPL
140212	2001 SJ_{232}	—	September 19, 2001	Socorro	LINEAR	·	4.2 km	MPC · JPL
140213	2001 SQ_{232}	—	September 19, 2001	Socorro	LINEAR	·	3.5 km	MPC · JPL
140214	2001 SV_{234}	—	September 19, 2001	Socorro	LINEAR	·	3.6 km	MPC · JPL
140215	2001 SY_{234}	—	September 19, 2001	Socorro	LINEAR	·	3.4 km	MPC · JPL
140216	2001 SW_{235}	—	September 19, 2001	Socorro	LINEAR	HOF	5.4 km	MPC · JPL
140217	2001 SA_{236}	—	September 19, 2001	Socorro	LINEAR	·	5.4 km	MPC · JPL
140218	2001 SD_{237}	—	September 19, 2001	Socorro	LINEAR	·	2.7 km	MPC · JPL
140219	2001 SS_{237}	—	September 19, 2001	Socorro	LINEAR	·	2.7 km	MPC · JPL
140220	2001 SH_{238}	—	September 19, 2001	Socorro	LINEAR	EOS	3.5 km	MPC · JPL
140221	2001 SC_{239}	—	September 19, 2001	Socorro	LINEAR	·	2.5 km	MPC · JPL
140222	2001 SU_{240}	—	September 19, 2001	Socorro	LINEAR	KOR	1.9 km	MPC · JPL
140223	2001 SX_{240}	—	September 19, 2001	Socorro	LINEAR	·	2.6 km	MPC · JPL
140224	2001 ST_{241}	—	September 19, 2001	Socorro	LINEAR	·	2.7 km	MPC · JPL
140225	2001 SU_{241}	—	September 19, 2001	Socorro	LINEAR	·	3.1 km	MPC · JPL
140226	2001 SX_{241}	—	September 19, 2001	Socorro	LINEAR	·	2.7 km	MPC · JPL
140227	2001 SC_{242}	—	September 19, 2001	Socorro	LINEAR	·	5.6 km	MPC · JPL
140228	2001 SV_{242}	—	September 19, 2001	Socorro	LINEAR	KOR	2.1 km	MPC · JPL
140229	2001 SC_{243}	—	September 19, 2001	Socorro	LINEAR	·	3.1 km	MPC · JPL
140230	2001 SC_{244}	—	September 19, 2001	Socorro	LINEAR	·	3.0 km	MPC · JPL
140231	2001 SQ_{245}	—	September 19, 2001	Socorro	LINEAR	·	3.0 km	MPC · JPL
140232	2001 SY_{245}	—	September 19, 2001	Socorro	LINEAR	·	3.2 km	MPC · JPL
140233	2001 SA_{246}	—	September 19, 2001	Socorro	LINEAR	THM	3.9 km	MPC · JPL
140234	2001 SD_{247}	—	September 19, 2001	Socorro	LINEAR	MRX	3.2 km	MPC · JPL
140235	2001 SF_{247}	—	September 19, 2001	Socorro	LINEAR	·	3.4 km	MPC · JPL
140236	2001 SE_{248}	—	September 19, 2001	Socorro	LINEAR	·	1.9 km	MPC · JPL
140237	2001 SG_{248}	—	September 19, 2001	Socorro	LINEAR	EOS	5.8 km	MPC · JPL
140238	2001 SJ_{248}	—	September 19, 2001	Socorro	LINEAR	THM	6.2 km	MPC · JPL
140239	2001 SS_{248}	—	September 19, 2001	Socorro	LINEAR	·	2.9 km	MPC · JPL
140240	2001 SW_{248}	—	September 19, 2001	Socorro	LINEAR	·	3.3 km	MPC · JPL
140241	2001 SW_{249}	—	September 19, 2001	Socorro	LINEAR	KOR	2.4 km	MPC · JPL
140242	2001 SO_{250}	—	September 19, 2001	Socorro	LINEAR	·	1.1 km	MPC · JPL
140243	2001 SP_{250}	—	September 19, 2001	Socorro	LINEAR	EOS	3.5 km	MPC · JPL
140244	2001 SA_{251}	—	September 19, 2001	Socorro	LINEAR	·	2.5 km	MPC · JPL
140245	2001 SM_{252}	—	September 19, 2001	Socorro	LINEAR	·	3.9 km	MPC · JPL
140246	2001 SR_{252}	—	September 19, 2001	Socorro	LINEAR	·	4.9 km	MPC · JPL
140247	2001 SY_{252}	—	September 19, 2001	Socorro	LINEAR	·	4.9 km	MPC · JPL
140248	2001 SH_{253}	—	September 19, 2001	Socorro	LINEAR	·	4.0 km	MPC · JPL
140249	2001 SL_{253}	—	September 19, 2001	Socorro	LINEAR	AGN	2.3 km	MPC · JPL
140250	2001 SC_{255}	—	September 19, 2001	Socorro	LINEAR	KOR	2.1 km	MPC · JPL
140251	2001 SN_{255}	—	September 19, 2001	Socorro	LINEAR	·	1.4 km	MPC · JPL
140252	2001 SB_{256}	—	September 19, 2001	Socorro	LINEAR	EOS	3.0 km	MPC · JPL
140253	2001 SV_{256}	—	September 19, 2001	Socorro	LINEAR	·	2.5 km	MPC · JPL
140254	2001 SK_{257}	—	September 19, 2001	Socorro	LINEAR	AGN	1.5 km	MPC · JPL
140255	2001 SN_{257}	—	September 19, 2001	Socorro	LINEAR	·	7.1 km	MPC · JPL
140256	2001 SB_{258}	—	September 20, 2001	Socorro	LINEAR	EOS	3.0 km	MPC · JPL
140257	2001 SE_{258}	—	September 20, 2001	Socorro	LINEAR	·	2.5 km	MPC · JPL
140258	2001 SN_{260}	—	September 20, 2001	Socorro	LINEAR	·	2.6 km	MPC · JPL
140259	2001 SQ_{260}	—	September 20, 2001	Socorro	LINEAR	HYG	5.4 km	MPC · JPL
140260	2001 SG_{263}	—	September 25, 2001	Farpoint	G. Hug	·	2.6 km	MPC · JPL
140261	2001 SJ_{263}	—	September 25, 2001	Fountain Hills	C. W. Juels, P. R. Holvorcem	ADE	6.6 km	MPC · JPL
140262	2001 SZ_{263}	—	September 24, 2001	Socorro	LINEAR	·	7.3 km	MPC · JPL
140263	2001 SO_{265}	—	September 25, 2001	Desert Eagle	W. K. Y. Yeung	·	3.7 km	MPC · JPL
140264	2001 SR_{267}	—	September 25, 2001	Desert Eagle	W. K. Y. Yeung	·	4.3 km	MPC · JPL
140265	2001 SL_{270}	—	September 26, 2001	Fountain Hills	C. W. Juels, P. R. Holvorcem	·	2.7 km	MPC · JPL
140266	2001 SW_{270}	—	September 16, 2001	Palomar	NEAT	·	3.4 km	MPC · JPL
140267	2001 SK_{271}	—	September 20, 2001	Socorro	LINEAR	EOS	3.3 km	MPC · JPL
140268	2001 SM_{271}	—	September 20, 2001	Socorro	LINEAR	·	2.7 km	MPC · JPL
140269	2001 SR_{271}	—	September 20, 2001	Socorro	LINEAR	·	3.6 km	MPC · JPL
140270	2001 SZ_{271}	—	September 20, 2001	Socorro	LINEAR	·	6.1 km	MPC · JPL
140271	2001 SF_{272}	—	September 20, 2001	Socorro	LINEAR	·	5.1 km	MPC · JPL
140272	2001 SL_{272}	—	September 21, 2001	Socorro	LINEAR	NYS	3.1 km	MPC · JPL
140273	2001 ST_{273}	—	September 19, 2001	Kitt Peak	Spacewatch	·	2.6 km	MPC · JPL
140274	2001 SX_{275}	—	September 21, 2001	Kitt Peak	Spacewatch	·	4.0 km	MPC · JPL
140275	2001 SL_{276}	—	September 16, 2001	Palomar	NEAT	GEF	3.4 km	MPC · JPL
140276	2001 SM_{276}	—	September 18, 2001	Palomar	NEAT	·	4.6 km	MPC · JPL
140277	2001 SP_{276}	—	September 21, 2001	Palomar	NEAT	EUN · slow	3.2 km	MPC · JPL
140278	2001 SR_{277}	—	September 21, 2001	Anderson Mesa	LONEOS	·	5.4 km	MPC · JPL
140279	2001 SY_{277}	—	September 21, 2001	Anderson Mesa	LONEOS	EOS	4.3 km	MPC · JPL
140280	2001 SF_{278}	—	September 21, 2001	Anderson Mesa	LONEOS	·	4.4 km	MPC · JPL
140281	2001 SV_{280}	—	September 21, 2001	Anderson Mesa	LONEOS	EOS	4.0 km	MPC · JPL
140282	2001 SO_{281}	—	September 21, 2001	Anderson Mesa	LONEOS	EOS	5.7 km	MPC · JPL
140283	2001 ST_{281}	—	September 21, 2001	Anderson Mesa	LONEOS	·	5.3 km	MPC · JPL
140284	2001 SO_{282}	—	September 21, 2001	Socorro	LINEAR	·	2.6 km	MPC · JPL
140285	2001 SH_{286}	—	September 21, 2001	Palomar	NEAT	·	4.1 km	MPC · JPL
140286	2001 SV_{286}	—	September 22, 2001	Palomar	NEAT	EOS	4.7 km	MPC · JPL
140287	2001 SC_{287}	—	September 22, 2001	Palomar	NEAT	·	7.6 km	MPC · JPL
140288	2001 SN_{289}	—	September 29, 2001	Palomar	NEAT	APO +1km · PHA	1.3 km	MPC · JPL
140289	2001 SW_{289}	—	September 29, 2001	Palomar	NEAT	GEF	2.6 km	MPC · JPL
140290	2001 SO_{290}	—	September 26, 2001	Socorro	LINEAR	·	3.3 km	MPC · JPL
140291	2001 SO_{292}	—	September 16, 2001	Socorro	LINEAR	·	3.8 km	MPC · JPL
140292	2001 SC_{295}	—	September 20, 2001	Socorro	LINEAR	·	2.6 km	MPC · JPL
140293	2001 SQ_{299}	—	September 20, 2001	Socorro	LINEAR	·	2.2 km	MPC · JPL
140294	2001 SO_{302}	—	September 20, 2001	Socorro	LINEAR	·	2.8 km	MPC · JPL
140295	2001 SH_{304}	—	September 20, 2001	Socorro	LINEAR	KOR	2.0 km	MPC · JPL
140296	2001 SR_{305}	—	September 20, 2001	Socorro	LINEAR	NAE	4.3 km	MPC · JPL
140297	2001 SW_{305}	—	September 20, 2001	Socorro	LINEAR	URS	7.8 km	MPC · JPL
140298	2001 SO_{307}	—	September 21, 2001	Socorro	LINEAR	·	3.9 km	MPC · JPL
140299	2001 SU_{311}	—	September 20, 2001	Socorro	LINEAR	·	4.1 km	MPC · JPL
140300	2001 SW_{311}	—	September 20, 2001	Socorro	LINEAR	EOS	3.9 km	MPC · JPL

== 140301–140400 ==
back to top

Designation			Discovery			Properties		Ref
Permanent	Provisional	Named after	Date	Site	Discoverer(s)	Category	Diam.	Ref
140301	2001 SL_{312}	—	September 21, 2001	Socorro	LINEAR	WIT	1.7 km	MPC · JPL
140302	2001 SQ_{312}	—	September 21, 2001	Socorro	LINEAR	KOR	2.0 km	MPC · JPL
140303	2001 SK_{313}	—	September 21, 2001	Socorro	LINEAR	·	5.9 km	MPC · JPL
140304	2001 SR_{313}	—	September 21, 2001	Socorro	LINEAR	·	7.6 km	MPC · JPL
140305	2001 SA_{314}	—	September 21, 2001	Socorro	LINEAR	·	3.8 km	MPC · JPL
140306	2001 SB_{314}	—	September 21, 2001	Socorro	LINEAR	·	3.3 km	MPC · JPL
140307	2001 SM_{315}	—	September 25, 2001	Socorro	LINEAR	·	4.6 km	MPC · JPL
140308	2001 SK_{316}	—	September 25, 2001	Socorro	LINEAR	·	3.0 km	MPC · JPL
140309	2001 SL_{318}	—	September 21, 2001	Socorro	LINEAR	·	1.2 km	MPC · JPL
140310	2001 SN_{318}	—	September 21, 2001	Socorro	LINEAR	KOR	1.9 km	MPC · JPL
140311	2001 SR_{319}	—	September 21, 2001	Socorro	LINEAR	KOR	2.0 km	MPC · JPL
140312	2001 SY_{319}	—	September 21, 2001	Socorro	LINEAR	EOS	5.3 km	MPC · JPL
140313	2001 SD_{320}	—	September 21, 2001	Socorro	LINEAR	EOS	3.4 km	MPC · JPL
140314	2001 SV_{320}	—	September 23, 2001	Socorro	LINEAR	EOS	3.5 km	MPC · JPL
140315	2001 SG_{321}	—	September 25, 2001	Socorro	LINEAR	·	4.9 km	MPC · JPL
140316	2001 SE_{322}	—	September 25, 2001	Socorro	LINEAR	·	2.3 km	MPC · JPL
140317	2001 SO_{323}	—	September 25, 2001	Socorro	LINEAR	·	4.6 km	MPC · JPL
140318	2001 SQ_{323}	—	September 25, 2001	Socorro	LINEAR	·	2.3 km	MPC · JPL
140319	2001 ST_{327}	—	September 18, 2001	Anderson Mesa	LONEOS	EOS	3.4 km	MPC · JPL
140320	2001 SX_{327}	—	September 18, 2001	Anderson Mesa	LONEOS	·	6.1 km	MPC · JPL
140321	2001 SD_{330}	—	September 19, 2001	Socorro	LINEAR	EOS	2.9 km	MPC · JPL
140322	2001 SD_{334}	—	September 19, 2001	Kitt Peak	Spacewatch	·	2.4 km	MPC · JPL
140323	2001 SD_{337}	—	September 20, 2001	Socorro	LINEAR	·	2.6 km	MPC · JPL
140324	2001 SK_{337}	—	September 20, 2001	Kitt Peak	Spacewatch	·	1.5 km	MPC · JPL
140325	2001 SC_{339}	—	September 21, 2001	Anderson Mesa	LONEOS	·	2.8 km	MPC · JPL
140326	2001 SV_{339}	—	September 21, 2001	Anderson Mesa	LONEOS	·	5.3 km	MPC · JPL
140327	2001 SY_{339}	—	September 21, 2001	Anderson Mesa	LONEOS	·	3.4 km	MPC · JPL
140328	2001 SD_{343}	—	September 22, 2001	Palomar	NEAT	EOS	4.2 km	MPC · JPL
140329	2001 SM_{344}	—	September 23, 2001	Palomar	NEAT	·	3.4 km	MPC · JPL
140330	2001 SY_{347}	—	September 26, 2001	Socorro	LINEAR	BRA	2.2 km	MPC · JPL
140331	2001 SG_{349}	—	September 26, 2001	Socorro	LINEAR	(194)	2.0 km	MPC · JPL
140332	2001 SK_{350}	—	September 20, 2001	Socorro	LINEAR	·	2.7 km	MPC · JPL
140333	2001 TD_{2}	—	October 10, 2001	Palomar	NEAT	ATE	500 m	MPC · JPL
140334	2001 TU_{3}	—	October 7, 2001	Palomar	NEAT	·	3.3 km	MPC · JPL
140335	2001 TZ_{3}	—	October 7, 2001	Palomar	NEAT	·	4.2 km	MPC · JPL
140336	2001 TP_{4}	—	October 8, 2001	Palomar	NEAT	·	6.7 km	MPC · JPL
140337	2001 TS_{4}	—	October 8, 2001	Palomar	NEAT	KOR	1.7 km	MPC · JPL
140338	2001 TX_{4}	—	October 8, 2001	Palomar	NEAT	·	3.9 km	MPC · JPL
140339	2001 TP_{5}	—	October 10, 2001	Palomar	NEAT	·	3.3 km	MPC · JPL
140340	2001 TO_{7}	—	October 11, 2001	Desert Eagle	W. K. Y. Yeung	LIX	8.3 km	MPC · JPL
140341	2001 TR_{7}	—	October 11, 2001	Desert Eagle	W. K. Y. Yeung	·	2.1 km	MPC · JPL
140342	2001 TG_{8}	—	October 9, 2001	Socorro	LINEAR	TEL	2.7 km	MPC · JPL
140343	2001 TX_{10}	—	October 13, 2001	Socorro	LINEAR	·	4.0 km	MPC · JPL
140344	2001 TO_{11}	—	October 13, 2001	Socorro	LINEAR	KOR	2.4 km	MPC · JPL
140345	2001 TV_{12}	—	October 13, 2001	Socorro	LINEAR	H	1.2 km	MPC · JPL
140346	2001 TO_{14}	—	October 7, 2001	Palomar	NEAT	·	4.5 km	MPC · JPL
140347	2001 TT_{14}	—	October 7, 2001	Palomar	NEAT	·	6.1 km	MPC · JPL
140348	2001 TK_{15}	—	October 13, 2001	Goodricke-Pigott	R. A. Tucker	CYB	9.0 km	MPC · JPL
140349	2001 TU_{15}	—	October 11, 2001	Socorro	LINEAR	·	3.7 km	MPC · JPL
140350	2001 TL_{16}	—	October 11, 2001	Socorro	LINEAR	MAR	2.3 km	MPC · JPL
140351	2001 TD_{18}	—	October 14, 2001	Desert Eagle	W. K. Y. Yeung	EOS	3.4 km	MPC · JPL
140352	2001 TK_{18}	—	October 14, 2001	Desert Eagle	W. K. Y. Yeung	·	4.1 km	MPC · JPL
140353	2001 TX_{18}	—	October 15, 2001	Goodricke-Pigott	R. A. Tucker	·	4.1 km	MPC · JPL
140354	2001 TM_{19}	—	October 9, 2001	Socorro	LINEAR	·	5.5 km	MPC · JPL
140355	2001 TN_{19}	—	October 9, 2001	Socorro	LINEAR	·	3.4 km	MPC · JPL
140356	2001 TY_{19}	—	October 9, 2001	Socorro	LINEAR	·	4.9 km	MPC · JPL
140357	2001 TY_{20}	—	October 9, 2001	Socorro	LINEAR	·	6.0 km	MPC · JPL
140358	2001 TH_{21}	—	October 9, 2001	Socorro	LINEAR	·	4.8 km	MPC · JPL
140359	2001 TL_{22}	—	October 13, 2001	Socorro	LINEAR	·	4.4 km	MPC · JPL
140360	2001 TD_{23}	—	October 13, 2001	Socorro	LINEAR	·	2.4 km	MPC · JPL
140361	2001 TN_{23}	—	October 14, 2001	Socorro	LINEAR	NYS	2.9 km	MPC · JPL
140362	2001 TQ_{23}	—	October 14, 2001	Socorro	LINEAR	·	2.8 km	MPC · JPL
140363	2001 TP_{24}	—	October 14, 2001	Socorro	LINEAR	·	5.7 km	MPC · JPL
140364	2001 TD_{27}	—	October 14, 2001	Socorro	LINEAR	·	6.5 km	MPC · JPL
140365	2001 TL_{27}	—	October 14, 2001	Socorro	LINEAR	·	6.2 km	MPC · JPL
140366	2001 TK_{28}	—	October 14, 2001	Socorro	LINEAR	·	2.6 km	MPC · JPL
140367	2001 TP_{28}	—	October 14, 2001	Socorro	LINEAR	·	4.3 km	MPC · JPL
140368	2001 TC_{29}	—	October 14, 2001	Socorro	LINEAR	·	2.3 km	MPC · JPL
140369	2001 TO_{29}	—	October 14, 2001	Socorro	LINEAR	·	3.1 km	MPC · JPL
140370	2001 TU_{30}	—	October 14, 2001	Socorro	LINEAR	·	3.8 km	MPC · JPL
140371	2001 TY_{30}	—	October 14, 2001	Socorro	LINEAR	TEL	2.5 km	MPC · JPL
140372	2001 TW_{32}	—	October 14, 2001	Socorro	LINEAR	EOS	3.6 km	MPC · JPL
140373	2001 TL_{34}	—	October 14, 2001	Socorro	LINEAR	·	6.8 km	MPC · JPL
140374	2001 TM_{36}	—	October 14, 2001	Socorro	LINEAR	·	6.1 km	MPC · JPL
140375	2001 TN_{36}	—	October 14, 2001	Socorro	LINEAR	EOS	4.3 km	MPC · JPL
140376	2001 TE_{37}	—	October 14, 2001	Socorro	LINEAR	·	4.6 km	MPC · JPL
140377	2001 TN_{37}	—	October 14, 2001	Socorro	LINEAR	EOS	4.0 km	MPC · JPL
140378	2001 TQ_{39}	—	October 14, 2001	Socorro	LINEAR	TIR	6.3 km	MPC · JPL
140379	2001 TD_{42}	—	October 14, 2001	Socorro	LINEAR	·	7.7 km	MPC · JPL
140380	2001 TF_{45}	—	October 14, 2001	Needville	J. Dellinger, W. G. Dillon	·	4.1 km	MPC · JPL
140381	2001 TR_{46}	—	October 15, 2001	Socorro	LINEAR	H	2.7 km	MPC · JPL
140382	2001 TV_{47}	—	October 14, 2001	Cima Ekar	ADAS	·	3.3 km	MPC · JPL
140383	2001 TP_{48}	—	October 14, 2001	Desert Eagle	W. K. Y. Yeung	·	5.3 km	MPC · JPL
140384	2001 TA_{49}	—	October 15, 2001	Socorro	LINEAR	H	930 m	MPC · JPL
140385	2001 TU_{49}	—	October 11, 2001	Socorro	LINEAR	·	3.7 km	MPC · JPL
140386	2001 TG_{51}	—	October 13, 2001	Socorro	LINEAR	DOR	6.0 km	MPC · JPL
140387	2001 TW_{51}	—	October 13, 2001	Socorro	LINEAR	·	3.5 km	MPC · JPL
140388	2001 TZ_{52}	—	October 13, 2001	Socorro	LINEAR	·	2.4 km	MPC · JPL
140389	2001 TM_{54}	—	October 14, 2001	Socorro	LINEAR	·	4.8 km	MPC · JPL
140390	2001 TB_{55}	—	October 14, 2001	Socorro	LINEAR	·	4.4 km	MPC · JPL
140391	2001 TQ_{55}	—	October 15, 2001	Socorro	LINEAR	·	4.1 km	MPC · JPL
140392	2001 TS_{57}	—	October 13, 2001	Socorro	LINEAR	AGN	2.1 km	MPC · JPL
140393	2001 TV_{57}	—	October 13, 2001	Socorro	LINEAR	·	4.6 km	MPC · JPL
140394	2001 TW_{58}	—	October 13, 2001	Socorro	LINEAR	·	3.5 km	MPC · JPL
140395	2001 TJ_{63}	—	October 13, 2001	Socorro	LINEAR	BRA	3.7 km	MPC · JPL
140396	2001 TG_{64}	—	October 13, 2001	Socorro	LINEAR	HYG	4.7 km	MPC · JPL
140397	2001 TK_{65}	—	October 13, 2001	Socorro	LINEAR	·	4.1 km	MPC · JPL
140398	2001 TM_{67}	—	October 13, 2001	Socorro	LINEAR	TEL	3.1 km	MPC · JPL
140399	2001 TN_{67}	—	October 13, 2001	Socorro	LINEAR	THM	5.3 km	MPC · JPL
140400	2001 TR_{68}	—	October 13, 2001	Socorro	LINEAR	·	2.3 km	MPC · JPL

== 140401–140500 ==
back to top

Designation			Discovery			Properties		Ref
Permanent	Provisional	Named after	Date	Site	Discoverer(s)	Category	Diam.	Ref
140401	2001 TJ_{70}	—	October 13, 2001	Socorro	LINEAR	·	6.7 km	MPC · JPL
140402	2001 TB_{71}	—	October 13, 2001	Socorro	LINEAR	·	4.5 km	MPC · JPL
140403	2001 TN_{71}	—	October 13, 2001	Socorro	LINEAR	·	2.4 km	MPC · JPL
140404	2001 TH_{73}	—	October 13, 2001	Socorro	LINEAR	·	1.4 km	MPC · JPL
140405	2001 TK_{73}	—	October 13, 2001	Socorro	LINEAR	KOR	2.3 km	MPC · JPL
140406	2001 TV_{73}	—	October 13, 2001	Socorro	LINEAR	·	3.7 km	MPC · JPL
140407	2001 TQ_{74}	—	October 13, 2001	Socorro	LINEAR	·	4.4 km	MPC · JPL
140408	2001 TC_{76}	—	October 13, 2001	Socorro	LINEAR	·	7.2 km	MPC · JPL
140409	2001 TO_{77}	—	October 13, 2001	Socorro	LINEAR	·	3.8 km	MPC · JPL
140410	2001 TJ_{81}	—	October 14, 2001	Socorro	LINEAR	·	3.8 km	MPC · JPL
140411	2001 TT_{82}	—	October 14, 2001	Socorro	LINEAR	·	2.7 km	MPC · JPL
140412	2001 TH_{83}	—	October 14, 2001	Socorro	LINEAR	·	3.1 km	MPC · JPL
140413	2001 TM_{84}	—	October 14, 2001	Socorro	LINEAR	·	2.7 km	MPC · JPL
140414	2001 TO_{85}	—	October 14, 2001	Socorro	LINEAR	EOS	3.4 km	MPC · JPL
140415	2001 TP_{85}	—	October 14, 2001	Socorro	LINEAR	·	5.2 km	MPC · JPL
140416	2001 TF_{87}	—	October 14, 2001	Socorro	LINEAR	·	7.4 km	MPC · JPL
140417	2001 TT_{87}	—	October 14, 2001	Socorro	LINEAR	·	4.8 km	MPC · JPL
140418	2001 TS_{89}	—	October 14, 2001	Socorro	LINEAR	·	3.2 km	MPC · JPL
140419	2001 TY_{89}	—	October 14, 2001	Socorro	LINEAR	·	3.1 km	MPC · JPL
140420	2001 TM_{90}	—	October 14, 2001	Socorro	LINEAR	EOS	3.5 km	MPC · JPL
140421	2001 TJ_{92}	—	October 14, 2001	Socorro	LINEAR	·	3.5 km	MPC · JPL
140422	2001 TO_{92}	—	October 14, 2001	Socorro	LINEAR	·	2.9 km	MPC · JPL
140423	2001 TM_{93}	—	October 14, 2001	Socorro	LINEAR	EOS	4.0 km	MPC · JPL
140424	2001 TO_{93}	—	October 14, 2001	Socorro	LINEAR	·	3.5 km	MPC · JPL
140425	2001 TS_{93}	—	October 14, 2001	Socorro	LINEAR	·	3.0 km	MPC · JPL
140426	2001 TU_{93}	—	October 14, 2001	Socorro	LINEAR	·	2.8 km	MPC · JPL
140427	2001 TE_{94}	—	October 14, 2001	Socorro	LINEAR	(18466)	3.7 km	MPC · JPL
140428	2001 TT_{94}	—	October 14, 2001	Socorro	LINEAR	EOS	3.8 km	MPC · JPL
140429	2001 TQ_{96}	—	October 14, 2001	Socorro	LINEAR	·	3.8 km	MPC · JPL
140430	2001 TS_{101}	—	October 15, 2001	Socorro	LINEAR	·	2.6 km	MPC · JPL
140431	2001 TU_{101}	—	October 15, 2001	Socorro	LINEAR	EOS	3.4 km	MPC · JPL
140432	2001 TC_{102}	—	October 15, 2001	Socorro	LINEAR	GEF	2.6 km	MPC · JPL
140433	2001 TK_{102}	—	October 15, 2001	Socorro	LINEAR	·	6.3 km	MPC · JPL
140434	2001 TB_{103}	—	October 15, 2001	Socorro	LINEAR	·	5.0 km	MPC · JPL
140435	2001 TX_{103}	—	October 15, 2001	Desert Eagle	W. K. Y. Yeung	·	5.4 km	MPC · JPL
140436	2001 TW_{104}	—	October 13, 2001	Socorro	LINEAR	EOS	3.5 km	MPC · JPL
140437	2001 TC_{106}	—	October 13, 2001	Socorro	LINEAR	·	5.5 km	MPC · JPL
140438	2001 TJ_{108}	—	October 14, 2001	Socorro	LINEAR	·	5.1 km	MPC · JPL
140439	2001 TY_{109}	—	October 14, 2001	Socorro	LINEAR	·	2.9 km	MPC · JPL
140440	2001 TK_{112}	—	October 14, 2001	Socorro	LINEAR	·	4.0 km	MPC · JPL
140441	2001 TH_{113}	—	October 14, 2001	Socorro	LINEAR	·	7.5 km	MPC · JPL
140442	2001 TF_{114}	—	October 14, 2001	Socorro	LINEAR	·	5.7 km	MPC · JPL
140443	2001 TR_{114}	—	October 14, 2001	Socorro	LINEAR	·	3.4 km	MPC · JPL
140444	2001 TR_{115}	—	October 14, 2001	Socorro	LINEAR	·	4.8 km	MPC · JPL
140445	2001 TB_{116}	—	October 14, 2001	Socorro	LINEAR	·	4.8 km	MPC · JPL
140446	2001 TU_{118}	—	October 15, 2001	Socorro	LINEAR	·	8.0 km	MPC · JPL
140447	2001 TX_{118}	—	October 15, 2001	Socorro	LINEAR	·	4.5 km	MPC · JPL
140448	2001 TQ_{120}	—	October 15, 2001	Socorro	LINEAR	ADE ·	4.5 km	MPC · JPL
140449	2001 TS_{120}	—	October 15, 2001	Socorro	LINEAR	·	3.2 km	MPC · JPL
140450	2001 TE_{121}	—	October 15, 2001	Socorro	LINEAR	·	5.1 km	MPC · JPL
140451	2001 TQ_{121}	—	October 15, 2001	Socorro	LINEAR	·	5.0 km	MPC · JPL
140452	2001 TX_{122}	—	October 15, 2001	Socorro	LINEAR	NAE	6.3 km	MPC · JPL
140453	2001 TN_{123}	—	October 12, 2001	Haleakala	NEAT	·	3.5 km	MPC · JPL
140454	2001 TB_{124}	—	October 12, 2001	Haleakala	NEAT	·	4.6 km	MPC · JPL
140455	2001 TY_{124}	—	October 12, 2001	Haleakala	NEAT	EOS	4.1 km	MPC · JPL
140456	2001 TS_{125}	—	October 12, 2001	Haleakala	NEAT	EOS	5.6 km	MPC · JPL
140457	2001 TS_{126}	—	October 13, 2001	Kitt Peak	Spacewatch	KOR	2.1 km	MPC · JPL
140458	2001 TF_{127}	—	October 11, 2001	Bergisch Gladbach	W. Bickel	·	4.5 km	MPC · JPL
140459	2001 TO_{127}	—	October 12, 2001	Anderson Mesa	LONEOS	·	2.0 km	MPC · JPL
140460	2001 TR_{127}	—	October 12, 2001	Anderson Mesa	LONEOS	EOS	2.5 km	MPC · JPL
140461	2001 TS_{127}	—	October 15, 2001	Socorro	LINEAR	H	880 m	MPC · JPL
140462	2001 TF_{128}	—	October 10, 2001	Palomar	NEAT	·	6.3 km	MPC · JPL
140463	2001 TX_{128}	—	October 14, 2001	Kitt Peak	Spacewatch	(12739)	2.7 km	MPC · JPL
140464	2001 TF_{129}	—	October 14, 2001	Kitt Peak	Spacewatch	·	2.5 km	MPC · JPL
140465	2001 TF_{130}	—	October 15, 2001	Kitt Peak	Spacewatch	·	1.8 km	MPC · JPL
140466	2001 TU_{130}	—	October 10, 2001	Palomar	NEAT	·	4.3 km	MPC · JPL
140467	2001 TN_{131}	—	October 11, 2001	Palomar	NEAT	EOS	3.6 km	MPC · JPL
140468	2001 TU_{132}	—	October 12, 2001	Haleakala	NEAT	·	4.2 km	MPC · JPL
140469	2001 TY_{133}	—	October 12, 2001	Haleakala	NEAT	·	6.5 km	MPC · JPL
140470	2001 TR_{134}	—	October 13, 2001	Palomar	NEAT	·	5.4 km	MPC · JPL
140471	2001 TZ_{134}	—	October 13, 2001	Palomar	NEAT	EUP	8.8 km	MPC · JPL
140472	2001 TB_{135}	—	October 13, 2001	Palomar	NEAT	EOS	3.2 km	MPC · JPL
140473	2001 TK_{135}	—	October 13, 2001	Palomar	NEAT	·	3.8 km	MPC · JPL
140474	2001 TM_{135}	—	October 13, 2001	Palomar	NEAT	·	5.3 km	MPC · JPL
140475	2001 TF_{137}	—	October 14, 2001	Palomar	NEAT	EOS	3.8 km	MPC · JPL
140476	2001 TL_{137}	—	October 14, 2001	Palomar	NEAT	·	4.5 km	MPC · JPL
140477	2001 TM_{137}	—	October 14, 2001	Palomar	NEAT	EOS	4.6 km	MPC · JPL
140478	2001 TN_{138}	—	October 10, 2001	Palomar	NEAT	·	2.9 km	MPC · JPL
140479	2001 TQ_{138}	—	October 10, 2001	Palomar	NEAT	·	3.4 km	MPC · JPL
140480	2001 TV_{138}	—	October 10, 2001	Palomar	NEAT	NEM	3.3 km	MPC · JPL
140481	2001 TQ_{140}	—	October 10, 2001	Palomar	NEAT	·	5.3 km	MPC · JPL
140482	2001 TK_{141}	—	October 10, 2001	Palomar	NEAT	·	2.6 km	MPC · JPL
140483	2001 TM_{141}	—	October 10, 2001	Palomar	NEAT	·	3.2 km	MPC · JPL
140484	2001 TH_{142}	—	October 10, 2001	Palomar	NEAT	BRA	3.8 km	MPC · JPL
140485	2001 TJ_{142}	—	October 10, 2001	Palomar	NEAT	RAF	1.9 km	MPC · JPL
140486	2001 TZ_{142}	—	October 10, 2001	Palomar	NEAT	·	2.1 km	MPC · JPL
140487	2001 TP_{143}	—	October 10, 2001	Palomar	NEAT	·	3.4 km	MPC · JPL
140488	2001 TS_{143}	—	October 10, 2001	Palomar	NEAT	·	2.4 km	MPC · JPL
140489	2001 TU_{145}	—	October 10, 2001	Palomar	NEAT	MRX	1.8 km	MPC · JPL
140490	2001 TJ_{148}	—	October 10, 2001	Palomar	NEAT	HOF	4.8 km	MPC · JPL
140491	2001 TA_{149}	—	October 10, 2001	Palomar	NEAT	·	2.3 km	MPC · JPL
140492	2001 TH_{151}	—	October 10, 2001	Palomar	NEAT	·	2.2 km	MPC · JPL
140493	2001 TL_{151}	—	October 10, 2001	Palomar	NEAT	EOS	3.7 km	MPC · JPL
140494	2001 TR_{151}	—	October 10, 2001	Palomar	NEAT	·	4.8 km	MPC · JPL
140495	2001 TK_{153}	—	October 11, 2001	Palomar	NEAT	·	4.2 km	MPC · JPL
140496	2001 TT_{153}	—	October 13, 2001	Palomar	NEAT	·	4.6 km	MPC · JPL
140497	2001 TX_{153}	—	October 13, 2001	Palomar	NEAT	·	7.0 km	MPC · JPL
140498	2001 TO_{155}	—	October 14, 2001	Kitt Peak	Spacewatch	·	4.0 km	MPC · JPL
140499	2001 TW_{156}	—	October 14, 2001	Kitt Peak	Spacewatch	HOF	3.1 km	MPC · JPL
140500	2001 TF_{158}	—	October 10, 2001	Palomar	NEAT	·	5.2 km	MPC · JPL

== 140501–140600 ==
back to top

Designation			Discovery			Properties		Ref
Permanent	Provisional	Named after	Date	Site	Discoverer(s)	Category	Diam.	Ref
140501	2001 TN_{158}	—	October 11, 2001	Palomar	NEAT	·	2.6 km	MPC · JPL
140502	2001 TK_{160}	—	October 15, 2001	Kitt Peak	Spacewatch	·	5.7 km	MPC · JPL
140503	2001 TN_{160}	—	October 15, 2001	Kitt Peak	Spacewatch	KOR	2.2 km	MPC · JPL
140504	2001 TO_{161}	—	October 11, 2001	Palomar	NEAT	·	2.6 km	MPC · JPL
140505	2001 TS_{161}	—	October 11, 2001	Palomar	NEAT	·	1.7 km	MPC · JPL
140506	2001 TJ_{163}	—	October 11, 2001	Palomar	NEAT	·	3.3 km	MPC · JPL
140507	2001 TH_{164}	—	October 11, 2001	Palomar	NEAT	·	4.0 km	MPC · JPL
140508	2001 TN_{165}	—	October 13, 2001	Socorro	LINEAR	EOS	3.4 km	MPC · JPL
140509	2001 TR_{165}	—	October 14, 2001	Socorro	LINEAR	HYG	5.4 km	MPC · JPL
140510	2001 TT_{165}	—	October 14, 2001	Socorro	LINEAR	·	6.6 km	MPC · JPL
140511	2001 TF_{166}	—	October 15, 2001	Socorro	LINEAR	(58892)	5.8 km	MPC · JPL
140512	2001 TN_{166}	—	October 15, 2001	Socorro	LINEAR	EOS	3.9 km	MPC · JPL
140513	2001 TY_{166}	—	October 15, 2001	Socorro	LINEAR	·	3.7 km	MPC · JPL
140514	2001 TF_{167}	—	October 15, 2001	Socorro	LINEAR	·	4.2 km	MPC · JPL
140515	2001 TA_{169}	—	October 15, 2001	Socorro	LINEAR	EOS	3.7 km	MPC · JPL
140516	2001 TU_{169}	—	October 15, 2001	Socorro	LINEAR	·	3.7 km	MPC · JPL
140517	2001 TV_{169}	—	October 15, 2001	Socorro	LINEAR	EOS	5.3 km	MPC · JPL
140518	2001 TY_{169}	—	October 15, 2001	Socorro	LINEAR	·	4.9 km	MPC · JPL
140519	2001 TZ_{169}	—	October 15, 2001	Socorro	LINEAR	·	5.0 km	MPC · JPL
140520	2001 TN_{170}	—	October 13, 2001	Palomar	NEAT	EOS	3.4 km	MPC · JPL
140521	2001 TS_{170}	—	October 13, 2001	Palomar	NEAT	EOS	5.5 km	MPC · JPL
140522	2001 TH_{171}	—	October 15, 2001	Palomar	NEAT	EOS	3.5 km	MPC · JPL
140523	2001 TK_{171}	—	October 15, 2001	Palomar	NEAT	·	5.6 km	MPC · JPL
140524	2001 TT_{171}	—	October 13, 2001	Anderson Mesa	LONEOS	·	2.5 km	MPC · JPL
140525	2001 TF_{172}	—	October 13, 2001	Socorro	LINEAR	·	4.1 km	MPC · JPL
140526	2001 TE_{173}	—	October 13, 2001	Socorro	LINEAR	·	3.5 km	MPC · JPL
140527	2001 TN_{174}	—	October 14, 2001	Socorro	LINEAR	·	3.2 km	MPC · JPL
140528	2001 TY_{174}	—	October 15, 2001	Socorro	LINEAR	·	4.3 km	MPC · JPL
140529	2001 TG_{176}	—	October 14, 2001	Socorro	LINEAR	·	4.9 km	MPC · JPL
140530	2001 TY_{176}	—	October 14, 2001	Socorro	LINEAR	EOS	2.7 km	MPC · JPL
140531	2001 TC_{180}	—	October 14, 2001	Socorro	LINEAR	EOS	3.7 km	MPC · JPL
140532	2001 TJ_{180}	—	October 14, 2001	Socorro	LINEAR	·	4.0 km	MPC · JPL
140533	2001 TK_{180}	—	October 14, 2001	Socorro	LINEAR	·	3.3 km	MPC · JPL
140534	2001 TT_{180}	—	October 14, 2001	Socorro	LINEAR	·	3.3 km	MPC · JPL
140535	2001 TN_{182}	—	October 14, 2001	Socorro	LINEAR	·	6.7 km	MPC · JPL
140536	2001 TO_{182}	—	October 14, 2001	Socorro	LINEAR	·	3.7 km	MPC · JPL
140537	2001 TQ_{182}	—	October 14, 2001	Socorro	LINEAR	·	4.4 km	MPC · JPL
140538	2001 TX_{182}	—	October 14, 2001	Socorro	LINEAR	BRA	4.1 km	MPC · JPL
140539	2001 TJ_{184}	—	October 14, 2001	Socorro	LINEAR	·	2.8 km	MPC · JPL
140540	2001 TU_{184}	—	October 14, 2001	Socorro	LINEAR	·	3.8 km	MPC · JPL
140541	2001 TO_{185}	—	October 14, 2001	Socorro	LINEAR	MRX	1.7 km	MPC · JPL
140542	2001 TP_{185}	—	October 14, 2001	Socorro	LINEAR	·	3.3 km	MPC · JPL
140543	2001 TS_{186}	—	October 14, 2001	Socorro	LINEAR	·	2.3 km	MPC · JPL
140544	2001 TH_{188}	—	October 14, 2001	Socorro	LINEAR	·	2.3 km	MPC · JPL
140545	2001 TA_{194}	—	October 15, 2001	Socorro	LINEAR	EOS	2.7 km	MPC · JPL
140546	2001 TZ_{194}	—	October 15, 2001	Palomar	NEAT	·	5.0 km	MPC · JPL
140547	2001 TA_{195}	—	October 15, 2001	Palomar	NEAT	EOS	4.0 km	MPC · JPL
140548	2001 TB_{197}	—	October 15, 2001	Palomar	NEAT	·	3.1 km	MPC · JPL
140549	2001 TU_{198}	—	October 11, 2001	Socorro	LINEAR	EOS	3.6 km	MPC · JPL
140550	2001 TY_{198}	—	October 11, 2001	Socorro	LINEAR	EOS	3.6 km	MPC · JPL
140551	2001 TE_{200}	—	October 11, 2001	Socorro	LINEAR	·	2.9 km	MPC · JPL
140552	2001 TW_{201}	—	October 11, 2001	Socorro	LINEAR	·	3.5 km	MPC · JPL
140553	2001 TQ_{202}	—	October 11, 2001	Socorro	LINEAR	·	3.3 km	MPC · JPL
140554	2001 TK_{203}	—	October 11, 2001	Socorro	LINEAR	·	6.9 km	MPC · JPL
140555	2001 TV_{203}	—	October 11, 2001	Socorro	LINEAR	·	3.3 km	MPC · JPL
140556	2001 TY_{203}	—	October 11, 2001	Socorro	LINEAR	·	3.5 km	MPC · JPL
140557	2001 TE_{204}	—	October 11, 2001	Socorro	LINEAR	PAD	4.4 km	MPC · JPL
140558	2001 TO_{204}	—	October 11, 2001	Socorro	LINEAR	EOS	3.1 km	MPC · JPL
140559	2001 TQ_{204}	—	October 11, 2001	Socorro	LINEAR	·	4.3 km	MPC · JPL
140560	2001 TW_{204}	—	October 11, 2001	Socorro	LINEAR	EOS	3.3 km	MPC · JPL
140561	2001 TL_{207}	—	October 11, 2001	Palomar	NEAT	·	2.4 km	MPC · JPL
140562	2001 TS_{207}	—	October 11, 2001	Palomar	NEAT	·	3.1 km	MPC · JPL
140563	2001 TE_{209}	—	October 12, 2001	Haleakala	NEAT	·	7.6 km	MPC · JPL
140564	2001 TY_{209}	—	October 13, 2001	Palomar	NEAT	HNS	2.0 km	MPC · JPL
140565	2001 TO_{210}	—	October 13, 2001	Palomar	NEAT	·	4.2 km	MPC · JPL
140566	2001 TR_{211}	—	October 13, 2001	Palomar	NEAT	·	4.6 km	MPC · JPL
140567	2001 TN_{212}	—	October 13, 2001	Palomar	NEAT	EOS	3.7 km	MPC · JPL
140568	2001 TZ_{212}	—	October 13, 2001	Anderson Mesa	LONEOS	·	7.6 km	MPC · JPL
140569	2001 TF_{213}	—	October 13, 2001	Anderson Mesa	LONEOS	·	4.2 km	MPC · JPL
140570	2001 TY_{213}	—	October 13, 2001	Kitt Peak	Spacewatch	·	4.3 km	MPC · JPL
140571	2001 TL_{214}	—	October 13, 2001	Palomar	NEAT	BRA	2.7 km	MPC · JPL
140572	2001 TE_{215}	—	October 13, 2001	Palomar	NEAT	·	3.6 km	MPC · JPL
140573	2001 TH_{215}	—	October 13, 2001	Palomar	NEAT	·	3.7 km	MPC · JPL
140574	2001 TA_{216}	—	October 13, 2001	Palomar	NEAT	·	6.4 km	MPC · JPL
140575	2001 TK_{217}	—	October 14, 2001	Socorro	LINEAR	·	3.6 km	MPC · JPL
140576	2001 TL_{217}	—	October 14, 2001	Socorro	LINEAR	·	3.8 km	MPC · JPL
140577	2001 TF_{219}	—	October 14, 2001	Anderson Mesa	LONEOS	·	7.2 km	MPC · JPL
140578	2001 TN_{221}	—	October 14, 2001	Socorro	LINEAR	·	6.0 km	MPC · JPL
140579	2001 TM_{222}	—	October 14, 2001	Palomar	NEAT	KON	4.8 km	MPC · JPL
140580	2001 TW_{223}	—	October 14, 2001	Socorro	LINEAR	·	4.5 km	MPC · JPL
140581	2001 TX_{223}	—	October 14, 2001	Socorro	LINEAR	·	2.9 km	MPC · JPL
140582	2001 TW_{225}	—	October 14, 2001	Anderson Mesa	LONEOS	T_{j} (2.99) · EUP	6.4 km	MPC · JPL
140583	2001 TZ_{225}	—	October 14, 2001	Palomar	NEAT	EOS	4.2 km	MPC · JPL
140584	2001 TU_{226}	—	October 14, 2001	Palomar	NEAT	·	2.5 km	MPC · JPL
140585	2001 TR_{227}	—	October 15, 2001	Palomar	NEAT	·	2.1 km	MPC · JPL
140586	2001 TP_{228}	—	October 15, 2001	Kitt Peak	Spacewatch	·	2.6 km	MPC · JPL
140587	2001 TE_{229}	—	October 15, 2001	Socorro	LINEAR	·	6.8 km	MPC · JPL
140588	2001 TU_{230}	—	October 15, 2001	Palomar	NEAT	GEF	2.9 km	MPC · JPL
140589	2001 TY_{230}	—	October 15, 2001	Palomar	NEAT	EOS	3.9 km	MPC · JPL
140590	2001 TR_{231}	—	October 15, 2001	Kitt Peak	Spacewatch	AST	2.0 km	MPC · JPL
140591	2001 TL_{232}	—	October 15, 2001	Palomar	NEAT	·	4.4 km	MPC · JPL
140592	2001 TZ_{233}	—	October 15, 2001	Haleakala	NEAT	GEF	2.0 km	MPC · JPL
140593	2001 TA_{235}	—	October 15, 2001	Haleakala	NEAT	·	5.1 km	MPC · JPL
140594	2001 TC_{236}	—	October 15, 2001	Palomar	NEAT	·	4.0 km	MPC · JPL
140595	2001 TE_{236}	—	October 15, 2001	Palomar	NEAT	·	5.0 km	MPC · JPL
140596	2001 TO_{236}	—	October 15, 2001	Haleakala	NEAT	slow	8.2 km	MPC · JPL
140597	2001 TZ_{237}	—	October 13, 2001	Palomar	NEAT	·	3.6 km	MPC · JPL
140598	2001 TD_{238}	—	October 14, 2001	Palomar	NEAT	·	3.7 km	MPC · JPL
140599	2001 TX_{238}	—	October 15, 2001	Palomar	NEAT	·	4.0 km	MPC · JPL
140600	2001 TC_{239}	—	October 15, 2001	Palomar	NEAT	EUN	3.3 km	MPC · JPL

== 140601–140700 ==
back to top

Designation			Discovery			Properties		Ref
Permanent	Provisional	Named after	Date	Site	Discoverer(s)	Category	Diam.	Ref
140601	2001 TP_{239}	—	October 15, 2001	Palomar	NEAT	EOS	3.6 km	MPC · JPL
140602 Berlind	2001 TU_{247}	Berlind	October 14, 2001	Apache Point	SDSS	KOR	1.9 km	MPC · JPL
140603	2001 UQ	—	October 18, 2001	Emerald Lane	L. Ball	HOF	4.6 km	MPC · JPL
140604	2001 UA_{3}	—	October 16, 2001	Socorro	LINEAR	·	6.7 km	MPC · JPL
140605	2001 UG_{3}	—	October 16, 2001	Socorro	LINEAR	·	4.0 km	MPC · JPL
140606	2001 UL_{3}	—	October 16, 2001	Socorro	LINEAR	·	2.9 km	MPC · JPL
140607	2001 UC_{4}	—	October 17, 2001	Desert Eagle	W. K. Y. Yeung	·	4.4 km	MPC · JPL
140608	2001 UD_{4}	—	October 17, 2001	Desert Eagle	W. K. Y. Yeung	V	1.4 km	MPC · JPL
140609	2001 UE_{4}	—	October 17, 2001	Desert Eagle	W. K. Y. Yeung	·	5.0 km	MPC · JPL
140610	2001 UG_{5}	—	October 19, 2001	Bisei SG Center	BATTeRS	PHO	2.9 km	MPC · JPL
140611	2001 UQ_{6}	—	October 17, 2001	Desert Eagle	W. K. Y. Yeung	·	5.3 km	MPC · JPL
140612	2001 UU_{6}	—	October 18, 2001	Desert Eagle	W. K. Y. Yeung	·	5.4 km	MPC · JPL
140613	2001 UX_{6}	—	October 18, 2001	Desert Eagle	W. K. Y. Yeung	·	3.2 km	MPC · JPL
140614	2001 UZ_{6}	—	October 18, 2001	Desert Eagle	W. K. Y. Yeung	·	5.2 km	MPC · JPL
140615	2001 UA_{7}	—	October 18, 2001	Desert Eagle	W. K. Y. Yeung	·	5.8 km	MPC · JPL
140616	2001 UC_{7}	—	October 22, 2001	Desert Eagle	W. K. Y. Yeung	·	5.0 km	MPC · JPL
140617	2001 UQ_{7}	—	October 17, 2001	Socorro	LINEAR	·	4.8 km	MPC · JPL
140618	2001 UC_{9}	—	October 17, 2001	Socorro	LINEAR	·	6.1 km	MPC · JPL
140619	2001 UG_{9}	—	October 17, 2001	Socorro	LINEAR	·	4.6 km	MPC · JPL
140620 Raoulwallenberg	2001 UN_{10}	Raoulwallenberg	October 21, 2001	Desert Eagle	W. K. Y. Yeung	·	3.9 km	MPC · JPL
140621	2001 UQ_{10}	—	October 21, 2001	Desert Eagle	W. K. Y. Yeung	HYG	6.8 km	MPC · JPL
140622	2001 UO_{12}	—	October 24, 2001	Desert Eagle	W. K. Y. Yeung	URS	7.9 km	MPC · JPL
140623	2001 UR_{12}	—	October 24, 2001	Desert Eagle	W. K. Y. Yeung	PAD	5.6 km	MPC · JPL
140624	2001 UY_{12}	—	October 24, 2001	Desert Eagle	W. K. Y. Yeung	·	6.6 km	MPC · JPL
140625	2001 UZ_{12}	—	October 24, 2001	Desert Eagle	W. K. Y. Yeung	·	3.4 km	MPC · JPL
140626	2001 UC_{13}	—	October 24, 2001	Desert Eagle	W. K. Y. Yeung	EOS	3.8 km	MPC · JPL
140627	2001 UR_{13}	—	October 24, 2001	Desert Eagle	W. K. Y. Yeung	·	6.3 km	MPC · JPL
140628 Klaipėda	2001 UM_{14}	Klaipėda	October 20, 2001	Molėtai	K. Černis, Zdanavicius, J.	V	1.1 km	MPC · JPL
140629	2001 UU_{14}	—	October 24, 2001	Desert Eagle	W. K. Y. Yeung	·	5.4 km	MPC · JPL
140630	2001 UY_{14}	—	October 24, 2001	Desert Eagle	W. K. Y. Yeung	EOS	5.0 km	MPC · JPL
140631	2001 UV_{15}	—	October 25, 2001	Desert Eagle	W. K. Y. Yeung	·	6.8 km	MPC · JPL
140632	2001 UQ_{17}	—	October 26, 2001	Emerald Lane	L. Ball	·	2.9 km	MPC · JPL
140633	2001 UR_{17}	—	October 26, 2001	Emerald Lane	L. Ball	·	6.4 km	MPC · JPL
140634	2001 UY_{18}	—	October 16, 2001	Palomar	NEAT	EOS	3.1 km	MPC · JPL
140635	2001 UY_{19}	—	October 16, 2001	Palomar	NEAT	·	4.1 km	MPC · JPL
140636	2001 UB_{21}	—	October 17, 2001	Socorro	LINEAR	TIR	5.0 km	MPC · JPL
140637	2001 UX_{21}	—	October 17, 2001	Socorro	LINEAR	·	3.8 km	MPC · JPL
140638	2001 UB_{22}	—	October 17, 2001	Socorro	LINEAR	ADE	5.5 km	MPC · JPL
140639	2001 UQ_{22}	—	October 17, 2001	Socorro	LINEAR	EOS	3.9 km	MPC · JPL
140640	2001 UO_{23}	—	October 18, 2001	Socorro	LINEAR	slow	7.3 km	MPC · JPL
140641	2001 UP_{25}	—	October 18, 2001	Socorro	LINEAR	·	3.4 km	MPC · JPL
140642	2001 US_{25}	—	October 18, 2001	Socorro	LINEAR	·	5.2 km	MPC · JPL
140643	2001 UW_{25}	—	October 18, 2001	Socorro	LINEAR	EOS	5.0 km	MPC · JPL
140644	2001 UL_{26}	—	October 18, 2001	Socorro	LINEAR	·	4.9 km	MPC · JPL
140645	2001 UO_{26}	—	October 18, 2001	Socorro	LINEAR	·	7.2 km	MPC · JPL
140646	2001 UX_{28}	—	October 16, 2001	Socorro	LINEAR	KOR	2.4 km	MPC · JPL
140647	2001 UM_{29}	—	October 16, 2001	Socorro	LINEAR	·	4.4 km	MPC · JPL
140648	2001 UN_{30}	—	October 16, 2001	Socorro	LINEAR	·	3.9 km	MPC · JPL
140649	2001 US_{30}	—	October 16, 2001	Socorro	LINEAR	·	3.6 km	MPC · JPL
140650	2001 UZ_{31}	—	October 16, 2001	Socorro	LINEAR	·	3.5 km	MPC · JPL
140651	2001 UU_{32}	—	October 16, 2001	Socorro	LINEAR	·	7.0 km	MPC · JPL
140652	2001 UX_{33}	—	October 16, 2001	Socorro	LINEAR	·	4.4 km	MPC · JPL
140653	2001 UC_{35}	—	October 16, 2001	Socorro	LINEAR	·	6.6 km	MPC · JPL
140654	2001 UQ_{36}	—	October 16, 2001	Socorro	LINEAR	·	4.1 km	MPC · JPL
140655	2001 UA_{37}	—	October 16, 2001	Socorro	LINEAR	EOS	4.0 km	MPC · JPL
140656	2001 UT_{37}	—	October 17, 2001	Socorro	LINEAR	·	4.9 km	MPC · JPL
140657	2001 UC_{39}	—	October 17, 2001	Socorro	LINEAR	·	2.2 km	MPC · JPL
140658	2001 UL_{39}	—	October 17, 2001	Socorro	LINEAR	·	4.1 km	MPC · JPL
140659	2001 US_{39}	—	October 17, 2001	Socorro	LINEAR	·	3.2 km	MPC · JPL
140660	2001 UH_{42}	—	October 17, 2001	Socorro	LINEAR	·	6.0 km	MPC · JPL
140661	2001 UY_{42}	—	October 17, 2001	Socorro	LINEAR	KOR	2.6 km	MPC · JPL
140662	2001 UU_{43}	—	October 17, 2001	Socorro	LINEAR	·	2.3 km	MPC · JPL
140663	2001 UN_{44}	—	October 17, 2001	Socorro	LINEAR	·	2.7 km	MPC · JPL
140664	2001 UG_{45}	—	October 17, 2001	Socorro	LINEAR	·	4.3 km	MPC · JPL
140665	2001 UH_{45}	—	October 17, 2001	Socorro	LINEAR	·	4.4 km	MPC · JPL
140666	2001 UO_{46}	—	October 17, 2001	Socorro	LINEAR	·	3.7 km	MPC · JPL
140667	2001 UT_{47}	—	October 17, 2001	Socorro	LINEAR	(5)	2.4 km	MPC · JPL
140668	2001 UG_{48}	—	October 17, 2001	Socorro	LINEAR	EOS	4.2 km	MPC · JPL
140669	2001 UV_{48}	—	October 17, 2001	Socorro	LINEAR	EOS	4.6 km	MPC · JPL
140670	2001 UY_{48}	—	October 17, 2001	Socorro	LINEAR	EOS	4.8 km	MPC · JPL
140671	2001 UR_{49}	—	October 17, 2001	Socorro	LINEAR	·	3.9 km	MPC · JPL
140672	2001 UH_{50}	—	October 17, 2001	Socorro	LINEAR	TEL	2.9 km	MPC · JPL
140673	2001 UK_{50}	—	October 17, 2001	Socorro	LINEAR	·	2.8 km	MPC · JPL
140674	2001 UX_{50}	—	October 17, 2001	Socorro	LINEAR	GEF	2.4 km	MPC · JPL
140675	2001 UR_{51}	—	October 17, 2001	Socorro	LINEAR	·	3.1 km	MPC · JPL
140676	2001 UY_{51}	—	October 17, 2001	Socorro	LINEAR	·	3.8 km	MPC · JPL
140677	2001 UZ_{51}	—	October 17, 2001	Socorro	LINEAR	KOR	2.0 km	MPC · JPL
140678	2001 UC_{52}	—	October 17, 2001	Socorro	LINEAR	THM	4.1 km	MPC · JPL
140679	2001 US_{52}	—	October 17, 2001	Socorro	LINEAR	NEM	3.9 km	MPC · JPL
140680	2001 UC_{53}	—	October 17, 2001	Socorro	LINEAR	·	1.9 km	MPC · JPL
140681	2001 UL_{53}	—	October 17, 2001	Socorro	LINEAR	·	5.7 km	MPC · JPL
140682	2001 UA_{54}	—	October 17, 2001	Socorro	LINEAR	·	4.4 km	MPC · JPL
140683	2001 UH_{54}	—	October 18, 2001	Socorro	LINEAR	·	2.5 km	MPC · JPL
140684	2001 UW_{54}	—	October 16, 2001	Socorro	LINEAR	GEF	1.9 km	MPC · JPL
140685	2001 UA_{55}	—	October 16, 2001	Socorro	LINEAR	·	4.8 km	MPC · JPL
140686	2001 UU_{55}	—	October 17, 2001	Socorro	LINEAR	·	4.6 km	MPC · JPL
140687	2001 UX_{55}	—	October 17, 2001	Socorro	LINEAR	·	3.9 km	MPC · JPL
140688	2001 UE_{57}	—	October 17, 2001	Socorro	LINEAR	·	2.6 km	MPC · JPL
140689	2001 UW_{58}	—	October 17, 2001	Socorro	LINEAR	·	5.3 km	MPC · JPL
140690	2001 UO_{61}	—	October 17, 2001	Socorro	LINEAR	KOR	1.7 km	MPC · JPL
140691	2001 UZ_{63}	—	October 18, 2001	Socorro	LINEAR	EOS	2.8 km	MPC · JPL
140692	2001 UF_{65}	—	October 18, 2001	Socorro	LINEAR	EOS	4.3 km	MPC · JPL
140693	2001 UN_{65}	—	October 18, 2001	Socorro	LINEAR	·	4.2 km	MPC · JPL
140694	2001 UD_{66}	—	October 18, 2001	Socorro	LINEAR	·	6.3 km	MPC · JPL
140695	2001 UD_{71}	—	October 17, 2001	Kitt Peak	Spacewatch	KOR	1.9 km	MPC · JPL
140696	2001 UV_{72}	—	October 16, 2001	Socorro	LINEAR	KOR · fast	2.5 km	MPC · JPL
140697	2001 UG_{73}	—	October 17, 2001	Socorro	LINEAR	·	4.4 km	MPC · JPL
140698	2001 UO_{73}	—	October 17, 2001	Socorro	LINEAR	·	3.3 km	MPC · JPL
140699	2001 UL_{74}	—	October 17, 2001	Socorro	LINEAR	EOS	3.7 km	MPC · JPL
140700	2001 UW_{74}	—	October 17, 2001	Socorro	LINEAR	·	4.5 km	MPC · JPL

== 140701–140800 ==
back to top

Designation			Discovery			Properties		Ref
Permanent	Provisional	Named after	Date	Site	Discoverer(s)	Category	Diam.	Ref
140701	2001 UJ_{75}	—	October 17, 2001	Socorro	LINEAR	·	6.7 km	MPC · JPL
140702	2001 UZ_{75}	—	October 17, 2001	Socorro	LINEAR	·	3.6 km	MPC · JPL
140703	2001 UE_{77}	—	October 17, 2001	Socorro	LINEAR	·	3.5 km	MPC · JPL
140704	2001 UG_{77}	—	October 17, 2001	Socorro	LINEAR	·	3.3 km	MPC · JPL
140705	2001 UG_{78}	—	October 20, 2001	Socorro	LINEAR	TIR	4.8 km	MPC · JPL
140706	2001 UV_{79}	—	October 20, 2001	Socorro	LINEAR	·	2.3 km	MPC · JPL
140707	2001 UB_{80}	—	October 20, 2001	Socorro	LINEAR	KOR	2.5 km	MPC · JPL
140708	2001 UH_{81}	—	October 20, 2001	Socorro	LINEAR	·	3.0 km	MPC · JPL
140709	2001 US_{82}	—	October 20, 2001	Socorro	LINEAR	·	3.2 km	MPC · JPL
140710	2001 UZ_{82}	—	October 20, 2001	Socorro	LINEAR	·	4.5 km	MPC · JPL
140711	2001 UB_{86}	—	October 16, 2001	Kitt Peak	Spacewatch	·	3.4 km	MPC · JPL
140712	2001 UK_{88}	—	October 21, 2001	Kitt Peak	Spacewatch	HYG	6.1 km	MPC · JPL
140713	2001 UB_{89}	—	October 20, 2001	Haleakala	NEAT	EOS	3.3 km	MPC · JPL
140714	2001 UO_{89}	—	October 22, 2001	Palomar	NEAT	·	3.6 km	MPC · JPL
140715	2001 UV_{91}	—	October 18, 2001	Palomar	NEAT	·	3.0 km	MPC · JPL
140716	2001 UK_{92}	—	October 18, 2001	Palomar	NEAT	·	3.9 km	MPC · JPL
140717	2001 UQ_{92}	—	October 18, 2001	Palomar	NEAT	EOS	3.8 km	MPC · JPL
140718	2001 UG_{93}	—	October 19, 2001	Haleakala	NEAT	URS ·	3.8 km	MPC · JPL
140719	2001 UL_{93}	—	October 19, 2001	Haleakala	NEAT	·	5.2 km	MPC · JPL
140720	2001 UO_{93}	—	October 19, 2001	Haleakala	NEAT	(1118)	8.3 km	MPC · JPL
140721	2001 UT_{93}	—	October 19, 2001	Haleakala	NEAT	·	5.3 km	MPC · JPL
140722	2001 UU_{93}	—	October 19, 2001	Haleakala	NEAT	·	3.7 km	MPC · JPL
140723	2001 UY_{93}	—	October 19, 2001	Haleakala	NEAT	EOS	3.2 km	MPC · JPL
140724	2001 UL_{94}	—	October 19, 2001	Haleakala	NEAT	EOS	4.3 km	MPC · JPL
140725	2001 UX_{94}	—	October 19, 2001	Haleakala	NEAT	·	5.4 km	MPC · JPL
140726	2001 UU_{95}	—	October 16, 2001	Socorro	LINEAR	HOF	4.8 km	MPC · JPL
140727	2001 UA_{96}	—	October 17, 2001	Socorro	LINEAR	·	3.2 km	MPC · JPL
140728	2001 UC_{96}	—	October 17, 2001	Socorro	LINEAR	KOR	1.9 km	MPC · JPL
140729	2001 UV_{97}	—	October 17, 2001	Socorro	LINEAR	KOR	2.2 km	MPC · JPL
140730	2001 UU_{98}	—	October 17, 2001	Socorro	LINEAR	EOS	3.4 km	MPC · JPL
140731	2001 UW_{98}	—	October 17, 2001	Socorro	LINEAR	·	3.8 km	MPC · JPL
140732	2001 UM_{99}	—	October 17, 2001	Socorro	LINEAR	KOR	2.5 km	MPC · JPL
140733	2001 UR_{99}	—	October 17, 2001	Socorro	LINEAR	·	2.7 km	MPC · JPL
140734	2001 UF_{100}	—	October 17, 2001	Socorro	LINEAR	·	2.8 km	MPC · JPL
140735	2001 UH_{101}	—	October 20, 2001	Socorro	LINEAR	·	4.7 km	MPC · JPL
140736	2001 UJ_{102}	—	October 20, 2001	Socorro	LINEAR	·	6.0 km	MPC · JPL
140737	2001 UY_{103}	—	October 20, 2001	Socorro	LINEAR	·	2.6 km	MPC · JPL
140738	2001 UH_{104}	—	October 20, 2001	Socorro	LINEAR	·	3.1 km	MPC · JPL
140739	2001 UZ_{104}	—	October 20, 2001	Socorro	LINEAR	·	2.8 km	MPC · JPL
140740	2001 UY_{105}	—	October 20, 2001	Socorro	LINEAR	·	4.2 km	MPC · JPL
140741	2001 UC_{107}	—	October 20, 2001	Socorro	LINEAR	·	2.7 km	MPC · JPL
140742	2001 UL_{107}	—	October 20, 2001	Socorro	LINEAR	TIR	2.9 km	MPC · JPL
140743	2001 UT_{107}	—	October 20, 2001	Socorro	LINEAR	KOR	1.7 km	MPC · JPL
140744	2001 UE_{108}	—	October 20, 2001	Socorro	LINEAR	·	2.7 km	MPC · JPL
140745	2001 UU_{108}	—	October 20, 2001	Socorro	LINEAR	·	5.1 km	MPC · JPL
140746	2001 US_{109}	—	October 20, 2001	Socorro	LINEAR	·	3.0 km	MPC · JPL
140747	2001 UV_{109}	—	October 20, 2001	Socorro	LINEAR	H	1.0 km	MPC · JPL
140748	2001 UD_{110}	—	October 21, 2001	Socorro	LINEAR	·	3.5 km	MPC · JPL
140749	2001 UE_{113}	—	October 21, 2001	Socorro	LINEAR	·	5.0 km	MPC · JPL
140750	2001 UZ_{113}	—	October 22, 2001	Socorro	LINEAR	EOS	3.0 km	MPC · JPL
140751	2001 UN_{114}	—	October 22, 2001	Socorro	LINEAR	THM	4.4 km	MPC · JPL
140752	2001 UH_{115}	—	October 22, 2001	Socorro	LINEAR	·	4.5 km	MPC · JPL
140753	2001 UC_{116}	—	October 22, 2001	Socorro	LINEAR	EOS	3.3 km	MPC · JPL
140754	2001 UX_{117}	—	October 22, 2001	Socorro	LINEAR	·	4.3 km	MPC · JPL
140755	2001 UY_{117}	—	October 22, 2001	Socorro	LINEAR	KOR	2.5 km	MPC · JPL
140756	2001 UR_{118}	—	October 22, 2001	Socorro	LINEAR	·	2.8 km	MPC · JPL
140757	2001 UX_{118}	—	October 22, 2001	Socorro	LINEAR	·	2.8 km	MPC · JPL
140758	2001 UA_{119}	—	October 22, 2001	Socorro	LINEAR	KOR	2.1 km	MPC · JPL
140759	2001 UB_{119}	—	October 22, 2001	Socorro	LINEAR	HYG	4.6 km	MPC · JPL
140760	2001 UN_{119}	—	October 22, 2001	Socorro	LINEAR	THM	3.7 km	MPC · JPL
140761	2001 UO_{120}	—	October 22, 2001	Socorro	LINEAR	·	3.1 km	MPC · JPL
140762	2001 UQ_{120}	—	October 22, 2001	Socorro	LINEAR	·	2.8 km	MPC · JPL
140763	2001 UY_{120}	—	October 22, 2001	Socorro	LINEAR	·	2.9 km	MPC · JPL
140764	2001 UB_{122}	—	October 22, 2001	Socorro	LINEAR	·	8.9 km	MPC · JPL
140765	2001 UF_{122}	—	October 22, 2001	Socorro	LINEAR	·	7.9 km	MPC · JPL
140766	2001 UZ_{122}	—	October 22, 2001	Socorro	LINEAR	·	6.7 km	MPC · JPL
140767	2001 UA_{123}	—	October 22, 2001	Socorro	LINEAR	·	4.7 km	MPC · JPL
140768	2001 UL_{123}	—	October 22, 2001	Socorro	LINEAR	·	6.5 km	MPC · JPL
140769	2001 UA_{124}	—	October 22, 2001	Palomar	NEAT	·	4.2 km	MPC · JPL
140770	2001 UU_{125}	—	October 23, 2001	Palomar	NEAT	·	3.6 km	MPC · JPL
140771	2001 UJ_{126}	—	October 23, 2001	Palomar	NEAT	·	4.5 km	MPC · JPL
140772	2001 UU_{127}	—	October 17, 2001	Socorro	LINEAR	·	7.2 km	MPC · JPL
140773	2001 UY_{128}	—	October 20, 2001	Socorro	LINEAR	BRA	2.9 km	MPC · JPL
140774	2001 UC_{131}	—	October 20, 2001	Socorro	LINEAR	·	4.0 km	MPC · JPL
140775	2001 US_{131}	—	October 20, 2001	Socorro	LINEAR	·	4.1 km	MPC · JPL
140776	2001 UU_{131}	—	October 20, 2001	Socorro	LINEAR	·	6.3 km	MPC · JPL
140777	2001 UZ_{131}	—	October 20, 2001	Socorro	LINEAR	KOR	1.8 km	MPC · JPL
140778	2001 UA_{133}	—	October 21, 2001	Socorro	LINEAR	KOR	1.7 km	MPC · JPL
140779	2001 UF_{133}	—	October 21, 2001	Socorro	LINEAR	MRX	2.0 km	MPC · JPL
140780	2001 UW_{133}	—	October 21, 2001	Socorro	LINEAR	·	3.3 km	MPC · JPL
140781	2001 UD_{134}	—	October 21, 2001	Socorro	LINEAR	DOR	5.1 km	MPC · JPL
140782	2001 UH_{136}	—	October 22, 2001	Socorro	LINEAR	·	3.6 km	MPC · JPL
140783	2001 UP_{137}	—	October 23, 2001	Socorro	LINEAR	·	2.4 km	MPC · JPL
140784	2001 UN_{139}	—	October 23, 2001	Socorro	LINEAR	·	4.5 km	MPC · JPL
140785	2001 UG_{140}	—	October 23, 2001	Socorro	LINEAR	·	5.1 km	MPC · JPL
140786	2001 UR_{140}	—	October 23, 2001	Socorro	LINEAR	·	1.7 km	MPC · JPL
140787	2001 UF_{141}	—	October 23, 2001	Socorro	LINEAR	·	3.0 km	MPC · JPL
140788	2001 UD_{142}	—	October 23, 2001	Socorro	LINEAR	KOR	2.5 km	MPC · JPL
140789	2001 UM_{142}	—	October 23, 2001	Socorro	LINEAR	(31811)	4.0 km	MPC · JPL
140790	2001 UV_{142}	—	October 23, 2001	Socorro	LINEAR	·	5.4 km	MPC · JPL
140791	2001 UG_{143}	—	October 23, 2001	Socorro	LINEAR	HYG	4.4 km	MPC · JPL
140792	2001 UW_{143}	—	October 23, 2001	Socorro	LINEAR	·	3.6 km	MPC · JPL
140793	2001 UM_{144}	—	October 23, 2001	Socorro	LINEAR	·	6.1 km	MPC · JPL
140794	2001 UQ_{145}	—	October 23, 2001	Socorro	LINEAR	·	3.6 km	MPC · JPL
140795	2001 UF_{146}	—	October 23, 2001	Socorro	LINEAR	·	4.4 km	MPC · JPL
140796	2001 UN_{146}	—	October 23, 2001	Socorro	LINEAR	·	5.5 km	MPC · JPL
140797	2001 UE_{148}	—	October 23, 2001	Socorro	LINEAR	·	2.5 km	MPC · JPL
140798	2001 UR_{149}	—	October 23, 2001	Socorro	LINEAR	KOR	2.2 km	MPC · JPL
140799	2001 UG_{150}	—	October 23, 2001	Socorro	LINEAR	·	2.9 km	MPC · JPL
140800	2001 UV_{150}	—	October 23, 2001	Socorro	LINEAR	·	5.1 km	MPC · JPL

== 140801–140900 ==
back to top

Designation			Discovery			Properties		Ref
Permanent	Provisional	Named after	Date	Site	Discoverer(s)	Category	Diam.	Ref
140801	2001 UK_{151}	—	October 23, 2001	Socorro	LINEAR	KOR	2.6 km	MPC · JPL
140802	2001 UM_{151}	—	October 23, 2001	Socorro	LINEAR	HYG	4.6 km	MPC · JPL
140803	2001 UX_{151}	—	October 23, 2001	Socorro	LINEAR	·	4.3 km	MPC · JPL
140804	2001 UJ_{152}	—	October 23, 2001	Socorro	LINEAR	·	2.9 km	MPC · JPL
140805	2001 UQ_{152}	—	October 23, 2001	Socorro	LINEAR	KOR	2.5 km	MPC · JPL
140806	2001 UT_{152}	—	October 23, 2001	Socorro	LINEAR	·	6.1 km	MPC · JPL
140807	2001 UR_{153}	—	October 23, 2001	Socorro	LINEAR	·	7.8 km	MPC · JPL
140808	2001 UV_{156}	—	October 23, 2001	Socorro	LINEAR	EOS	4.4 km	MPC · JPL
140809	2001 UL_{157}	—	October 23, 2001	Socorro	LINEAR	KOR	2.5 km	MPC · JPL
140810	2001 UM_{158}	—	October 23, 2001	Socorro	LINEAR	EOS	2.9 km	MPC · JPL
140811	2001 UC_{159}	—	October 23, 2001	Socorro	LINEAR	·	3.3 km	MPC · JPL
140812	2001 UE_{159}	—	October 23, 2001	Socorro	LINEAR	·	4.8 km	MPC · JPL
140813	2001 UN_{159}	—	October 23, 2001	Socorro	LINEAR	·	3.3 km	MPC · JPL
140814	2001 US_{159}	—	October 23, 2001	Socorro	LINEAR	·	3.5 km	MPC · JPL
140815	2001 UL_{160}	—	October 23, 2001	Socorro	LINEAR	·	3.1 km	MPC · JPL
140816	2001 UD_{161}	—	October 23, 2001	Socorro	LINEAR	·	3.7 km	MPC · JPL
140817	2001 UR_{161}	—	October 23, 2001	Socorro	LINEAR	·	3.2 km	MPC · JPL
140818	2001 UC_{162}	—	October 23, 2001	Socorro	LINEAR	·	4.7 km	MPC · JPL
140819	2001 UR_{162}	—	October 23, 2001	Socorro	LINEAR	·	3.4 km	MPC · JPL
140820	2001 UO_{163}	—	October 23, 2001	Socorro	LINEAR	EUP	8.8 km	MPC · JPL
140821	2001 UA_{164}	—	October 18, 2001	Palomar	NEAT	·	3.6 km	MPC · JPL
140822	2001 UO_{164}	—	October 19, 2001	Palomar	NEAT	·	3.2 km	MPC · JPL
140823	2001 UT_{165}	—	October 23, 2001	Palomar	NEAT	EOS	5.4 km	MPC · JPL
140824	2001 UC_{167}	—	October 18, 2001	Socorro	LINEAR	·	4.4 km	MPC · JPL
140825	2001 UZ_{167}	—	October 19, 2001	Socorro	LINEAR	·	4.1 km	MPC · JPL
140826	2001 UX_{168}	—	October 19, 2001	Socorro	LINEAR	·	6.4 km	MPC · JPL
140827	2001 UZ_{169}	—	October 21, 2001	Socorro	LINEAR	·	3.7 km	MPC · JPL
140828	2001 UA_{172}	—	October 18, 2001	Palomar	NEAT	·	4.8 km	MPC · JPL
140829	2001 UQ_{172}	—	October 18, 2001	Palomar	NEAT	HOF	3.8 km	MPC · JPL
140830	2001 UL_{173}	—	October 18, 2001	Palomar	NEAT	·	3.2 km	MPC · JPL
140831	2001 UV_{174}	—	October 19, 2001	Palomar	NEAT	·	3.2 km	MPC · JPL
140832	2001 UK_{175}	—	October 24, 2001	Palomar	NEAT	EOS	2.7 km	MPC · JPL
140833	2001 UE_{179}	—	October 25, 2001	Palomar	NEAT	KOR	2.2 km	MPC · JPL
140834	2001 UF_{179}	—	October 25, 2001	Palomar	NEAT	·	4.4 km	MPC · JPL
140835	2001 UL_{184}	—	October 16, 2001	Palomar	NEAT	·	2.2 km	MPC · JPL
140836	2001 UD_{192}	—	October 18, 2001	Socorro	LINEAR	·	5.1 km	MPC · JPL
140837	2001 UP_{192}	—	October 18, 2001	Socorro	LINEAR	·	4.3 km	MPC · JPL
140838	2001 UU_{192}	—	October 18, 2001	Socorro	LINEAR	EOS	3.8 km	MPC · JPL
140839	2001 UH_{193}	—	October 18, 2001	Socorro	LINEAR	·	2.7 km	MPC · JPL
140840	2001 UO_{193}	—	October 18, 2001	Socorro	LINEAR	·	5.9 km	MPC · JPL
140841	2001 UO_{198}	—	October 19, 2001	Palomar	NEAT	EOS	3.2 km	MPC · JPL
140842	2001 UH_{199}	—	October 19, 2001	Anderson Mesa	LONEOS	·	4.3 km	MPC · JPL
140843	2001 UP_{203}	—	October 19, 2001	Palomar	NEAT	·	3.0 km	MPC · JPL
140844	2001 UE_{206}	—	October 20, 2001	Socorro	LINEAR	·	3.7 km	MPC · JPL
140845	2001 UK_{206}	—	October 20, 2001	Kitt Peak	Spacewatch	TRE	2.8 km	MPC · JPL
140846	2001 UX_{206}	—	October 20, 2001	Socorro	LINEAR	BRA	3.4 km	MPC · JPL
140847	2001 UR_{209}	—	October 20, 2001	Palomar	NEAT	·	2.2 km	MPC · JPL
140848	2001 UJ_{210}	—	October 21, 2001	Anderson Mesa	LONEOS	·	4.5 km	MPC · JPL
140849	2001 UB_{212}	—	October 21, 2001	Socorro	LINEAR	·	4.4 km	MPC · JPL
140850	2001 UH_{212}	—	October 21, 2001	Socorro	LINEAR	·	2.6 km	MPC · JPL
140851	2001 UA_{213}	—	October 22, 2001	Socorro	LINEAR	·	4.0 km	MPC · JPL
140852	2001 UT_{215}	—	October 23, 2001	Socorro	LINEAR	·	5.2 km	MPC · JPL
140853	2001 UU_{215}	—	October 23, 2001	Desert Eagle	W. K. Y. Yeung	EOS	3.6 km	MPC · JPL
140854	2001 UR_{219}	—	October 17, 2001	Socorro	LINEAR	·	5.6 km	MPC · JPL
140855	2001 US_{219}	—	October 17, 2001	Socorro	LINEAR	·	8.0 km	MPC · JPL
140856	2001 UY_{219}	—	October 18, 2001	Palomar	NEAT	GEF	1.6 km	MPC · JPL
140857	2001 UZ_{221}	—	October 24, 2001	Socorro	LINEAR	KOR	1.9 km	MPC · JPL
140858	2001 UU_{222}	—	October 24, 2001	Kvistaberg	Uppsala-DLR Asteroid Survey	·	3.9 km	MPC · JPL
140859	2001 VP	—	November 7, 2001	Socorro	LINEAR	EUP	6.8 km	MPC · JPL
140860	2001 VW	—	November 6, 2001	Socorro	LINEAR	·	2.4 km	MPC · JPL
140861	2001 VD_{1}	—	November 6, 2001	Socorro	LINEAR	·	2.9 km	MPC · JPL
140862	2001 VB_{3}	—	November 9, 2001	Kitt Peak	Spacewatch	EOS	4.1 km	MPC · JPL
140863	2001 VZ_{3}	—	November 11, 2001	Kitt Peak	Spacewatch	KOR	1.9 km	MPC · JPL
140864	2001 VL_{4}	—	November 9, 2001	Socorro	LINEAR	H	1.1 km	MPC · JPL
140865	2001 VX_{7}	—	November 9, 2001	Socorro	LINEAR	NAE	4.9 km	MPC · JPL
140866	2001 VZ_{9}	—	November 10, 2001	Socorro	LINEAR	·	4.8 km	MPC · JPL
140867	2001 VJ_{10}	—	November 10, 2001	Socorro	LINEAR	·	5.6 km	MPC · JPL
140868	2001 VQ_{10}	—	November 10, 2001	Socorro	LINEAR	·	4.8 km	MPC · JPL
140869	2001 VZ_{10}	—	November 10, 2001	Socorro	LINEAR	·	1.8 km	MPC · JPL
140870	2001 VS_{12}	—	November 10, 2001	Socorro	LINEAR	·	6.1 km	MPC · JPL
140871	2001 VH_{15}	—	November 10, 2001	Socorro	LINEAR	·	5.1 km	MPC · JPL
140872	2001 VO_{16}	—	November 7, 2001	Palomar	NEAT	EUN	2.2 km	MPC · JPL
140873	2001 VH_{17}	—	November 11, 2001	Ondřejov	P. Kušnirák, P. Pravec	EOS	3.5 km	MPC · JPL
140874	2001 VL_{17}	—	November 9, 2001	Bergisch Gladbach	W. Bickel	VER	8.2 km	MPC · JPL
140875	2001 VP_{17}	—	November 8, 2001	Socorro	LINEAR	·	5.7 km	MPC · JPL
140876	2001 VM_{19}	—	November 9, 2001	Socorro	LINEAR	·	6.2 km	MPC · JPL
140877	2001 VN_{19}	—	November 9, 2001	Socorro	LINEAR	THM	4.0 km	MPC · JPL
140878	2001 VP_{19}	—	November 9, 2001	Socorro	LINEAR	·	5.5 km	MPC · JPL
140879	2001 VE_{20}	—	November 9, 2001	Socorro	LINEAR	·	3.3 km	MPC · JPL
140880	2001 VL_{20}	—	November 9, 2001	Socorro	LINEAR	·	3.0 km	MPC · JPL
140881	2001 VB_{21}	—	November 9, 2001	Socorro	LINEAR	HYG	4.5 km	MPC · JPL
140882	2001 VG_{22}	—	November 9, 2001	Socorro	LINEAR	·	4.6 km	MPC · JPL
140883	2001 VD_{24}	—	November 9, 2001	Socorro	LINEAR	·	3.3 km	MPC · JPL
140884	2001 VH_{25}	—	November 9, 2001	Socorro	LINEAR	(31811)	5.6 km	MPC · JPL
140885	2001 VH_{26}	—	November 9, 2001	Socorro	LINEAR	·	5.0 km	MPC · JPL
140886	2001 VY_{27}	—	November 9, 2001	Socorro	LINEAR	·	3.6 km	MPC · JPL
140887	2001 VD_{28}	—	November 9, 2001	Socorro	LINEAR	·	3.5 km	MPC · JPL
140888	2001 VX_{28}	—	November 9, 2001	Socorro	LINEAR	·	9.3 km	MPC · JPL
140889	2001 VL_{29}	—	November 9, 2001	Socorro	LINEAR	·	3.3 km	MPC · JPL
140890	2001 VK_{30}	—	November 9, 2001	Socorro	LINEAR	THM	4.3 km	MPC · JPL
140891	2001 VB_{31}	—	November 9, 2001	Socorro	LINEAR	GAL	3.1 km	MPC · JPL
140892	2001 VG_{31}	—	November 9, 2001	Socorro	LINEAR	·	5.7 km	MPC · JPL
140893	2001 VF_{32}	—	November 9, 2001	Socorro	LINEAR	THM	4.7 km	MPC · JPL
140894	2001 VT_{32}	—	November 9, 2001	Socorro	LINEAR	·	3.1 km	MPC · JPL
140895	2001 VR_{33}	—	November 9, 2001	Socorro	LINEAR	·	4.5 km	MPC · JPL
140896	2001 VW_{35}	—	November 9, 2001	Socorro	LINEAR	·	8.6 km	MPC · JPL
140897	2001 VC_{36}	—	November 9, 2001	Socorro	LINEAR	·	4.9 km	MPC · JPL
140898	2001 VV_{37}	—	November 9, 2001	Socorro	LINEAR	·	4.5 km	MPC · JPL
140899	2001 VK_{38}	—	November 9, 2001	Socorro	LINEAR	·	5.4 km	MPC · JPL
140900	2001 VW_{38}	—	November 9, 2001	Socorro	LINEAR	·	7.7 km	MPC · JPL

== 140901–141000 ==
back to top

Designation			Discovery			Properties		Ref
Permanent	Provisional	Named after	Date	Site	Discoverer(s)	Category	Diam.	Ref
140901	2001 VT_{40}	—	November 9, 2001	Socorro	LINEAR	LIX	7.1 km	MPC · JPL
140902	2001 VK_{49}	—	November 10, 2001	Socorro	LINEAR	EOS	2.9 km	MPC · JPL
140903	2001 VO_{49}	—	November 10, 2001	Socorro	LINEAR	NAE	6.6 km	MPC · JPL
140904	2001 VV_{49}	—	November 10, 2001	Socorro	LINEAR	·	3.2 km	MPC · JPL
140905	2001 VC_{50}	—	November 10, 2001	Socorro	LINEAR	·	4.2 km	MPC · JPL
140906	2001 VG_{52}	—	November 10, 2001	Socorro	LINEAR	·	4.4 km	MPC · JPL
140907	2001 VJ_{52}	—	November 10, 2001	Socorro	LINEAR	·	3.0 km	MPC · JPL
140908	2001 VP_{53}	—	November 10, 2001	Socorro	LINEAR	·	6.2 km	MPC · JPL
140909	2001 VW_{54}	—	November 10, 2001	Socorro	LINEAR	·	5.9 km	MPC · JPL
140910	2001 VH_{55}	—	November 10, 2001	Socorro	LINEAR	·	5.7 km	MPC · JPL
140911	2001 VO_{57}	—	November 10, 2001	Socorro	LINEAR	·	5.2 km	MPC · JPL
140912	2001 VA_{58}	—	November 10, 2001	Socorro	LINEAR	·	2.4 km	MPC · JPL
140913	2001 VT_{58}	—	November 10, 2001	Socorro	LINEAR	EOS	4.1 km	MPC · JPL
140914	2001 VH_{60}	—	November 10, 2001	Socorro	LINEAR	·	3.9 km	MPC · JPL
140915	2001 VY_{61}	—	November 10, 2001	Socorro	LINEAR	·	5.9 km	MPC · JPL
140916	2001 VN_{62}	—	November 10, 2001	Socorro	LINEAR	·	6.0 km	MPC · JPL
140917	2001 VQ_{62}	—	November 10, 2001	Socorro	LINEAR	slow	6.2 km	MPC · JPL
140918	2001 VZ_{62}	—	November 10, 2001	Socorro	LINEAR	·	7.6 km	MPC · JPL
140919	2001 VM_{63}	—	November 10, 2001	Socorro	LINEAR	·	4.6 km	MPC · JPL
140920	2001 VQ_{65}	—	November 10, 2001	Socorro	LINEAR	MRX	1.8 km	MPC · JPL
140921	2001 VS_{65}	—	November 10, 2001	Socorro	LINEAR	·	4.7 km	MPC · JPL
140922	2001 VW_{65}	—	November 10, 2001	Socorro	LINEAR	·	3.3 km	MPC · JPL
140923	2001 VX_{66}	—	November 10, 2001	Socorro	LINEAR	·	2.1 km	MPC · JPL
140924	2001 VU_{67}	—	November 11, 2001	Socorro	LINEAR	·	5.6 km	MPC · JPL
140925	2001 VR_{68}	—	November 11, 2001	Socorro	LINEAR	·	7.6 km	MPC · JPL
140926	2001 VY_{69}	—	November 11, 2001	Socorro	LINEAR	·	7.7 km	MPC · JPL
140927	2001 VM_{74}	—	November 14, 2001	Kitt Peak	Spacewatch	·	3.5 km	MPC · JPL
140928	2001 VG_{75}	—	November 12, 2001	Socorro	LINEAR	AMO +1km	780 m	MPC · JPL
140929	2001 VY_{77}	—	November 11, 2001	Kitt Peak	Spacewatch	·	4.8 km	MPC · JPL
140930	2001 VU_{79}	—	November 9, 2001	Palomar	NEAT	HYG	4.6 km	MPC · JPL
140931	2001 VO_{81}	—	November 15, 2001	Palomar	NEAT	·	3.7 km	MPC · JPL
140932	2001 VA_{82}	—	November 12, 2001	Socorro	LINEAR	H	1.0 km	MPC · JPL
140933	2001 VS_{82}	—	November 10, 2001	Socorro	LINEAR	·	5.1 km	MPC · JPL
140934	2001 VB_{84}	—	November 11, 2001	Socorro	LINEAR	·	3.3 km	MPC · JPL
140935	2001 VM_{84}	—	November 12, 2001	Socorro	LINEAR	BRA	4.0 km	MPC · JPL
140936	2001 VV_{84}	—	November 12, 2001	Socorro	LINEAR	EOS	3.2 km	MPC · JPL
140937	2001 VS_{86}	—	November 13, 2001	Socorro	LINEAR	·	5.2 km	MPC · JPL
140938	2001 VU_{88}	—	November 12, 2001	Anderson Mesa	LONEOS	·	7.1 km	MPC · JPL
140939	2001 VZ_{89}	—	November 15, 2001	Socorro	LINEAR	·	7.2 km	MPC · JPL
140940	2001 VR_{90}	—	November 15, 2001	Socorro	LINEAR	·	4.6 km	MPC · JPL
140941	2001 VU_{90}	—	November 15, 2001	Socorro	LINEAR	·	7.2 km	MPC · JPL
140942	2001 VS_{91}	—	November 15, 2001	Socorro	LINEAR	·	5.4 km	MPC · JPL
140943	2001 VJ_{93}	—	November 15, 2001	Socorro	LINEAR	(895)	6.3 km	MPC · JPL
140944	2001 VU_{93}	—	November 15, 2001	Socorro	LINEAR	·	4.3 km	MPC · JPL
140945	2001 VW_{93}	—	November 15, 2001	Socorro	LINEAR	·	7.1 km	MPC · JPL
140946	2001 VO_{94}	—	November 15, 2001	Socorro	LINEAR	·	4.6 km	MPC · JPL
140947	2001 VM_{95}	—	November 15, 2001	Socorro	LINEAR	·	6.0 km	MPC · JPL
140948	2001 VC_{98}	—	November 15, 2001	Socorro	LINEAR	·	5.5 km	MPC · JPL
140949	2001 VK_{98}	—	November 15, 2001	Socorro	LINEAR	·	7.4 km	MPC · JPL
140950	2001 VP_{99}	—	November 15, 2001	Socorro	LINEAR	·	6.5 km	MPC · JPL
140951	2001 VZ_{99}	—	November 15, 2001	Socorro	LINEAR	·	7.1 km	MPC · JPL
140952	2001 VK_{100}	—	November 12, 2001	Anderson Mesa	LONEOS	·	3.0 km	MPC · JPL
140953	2001 VR_{100}	—	November 8, 2001	Socorro	LINEAR	H	1.2 km	MPC · JPL
140954	2001 VZ_{100}	—	November 12, 2001	Socorro	LINEAR	·	2.4 km	MPC · JPL
140955	2001 VF_{101}	—	November 12, 2001	Socorro	LINEAR	VER	5.1 km	MPC · JPL
140956	2001 VL_{102}	—	November 12, 2001	Socorro	LINEAR	·	6.4 km	MPC · JPL
140957	2001 VJ_{103}	—	November 12, 2001	Socorro	LINEAR	AEG	5.9 km	MPC · JPL
140958	2001 VT_{103}	—	November 12, 2001	Socorro	LINEAR	fast	3.5 km	MPC · JPL
140959	2001 VD_{104}	—	November 12, 2001	Socorro	LINEAR	EOS	2.6 km	MPC · JPL
140960	2001 VL_{105}	—	November 12, 2001	Socorro	LINEAR	·	4.7 km	MPC · JPL
140961	2001 VZ_{106}	—	November 12, 2001	Socorro	LINEAR	EOS	3.5 km	MPC · JPL
140962	2001 VB_{107}	—	November 12, 2001	Socorro	LINEAR	·	5.3 km	MPC · JPL
140963	2001 VX_{107}	—	November 12, 2001	Socorro	LINEAR	·	2.7 km	MPC · JPL
140964	2001 VM_{108}	—	November 12, 2001	Socorro	LINEAR	·	6.1 km	MPC · JPL
140965	2001 VF_{111}	—	November 12, 2001	Socorro	LINEAR	EMA	4.2 km	MPC · JPL
140966	2001 VV_{112}	—	November 12, 2001	Socorro	LINEAR	HYG	5.1 km	MPC · JPL
140967	2001 VL_{113}	—	November 12, 2001	Socorro	LINEAR	EOS	3.8 km	MPC · JPL
140968	2001 VU_{116}	—	November 12, 2001	Socorro	LINEAR	THM	7.3 km	MPC · JPL
140969	2001 VE_{118}	—	November 12, 2001	Socorro	LINEAR	EOS	3.6 km	MPC · JPL
140970	2001 VL_{118}	—	November 12, 2001	Socorro	LINEAR	·	6.4 km	MPC · JPL
140971	2001 VY_{118}	—	November 12, 2001	Socorro	LINEAR	·	5.3 km	MPC · JPL
140972	2001 VF_{120}	—	November 12, 2001	Socorro	LINEAR	EOS	3.8 km	MPC · JPL
140973	2001 VN_{120}	—	November 12, 2001	Socorro	LINEAR	MAR	3.3 km	MPC · JPL
140974	2001 VW_{120}	—	November 12, 2001	Socorro	LINEAR	EOS	3.2 km	MPC · JPL
140975	2001 VM_{121}	—	November 15, 2001	Palomar	NEAT	·	2.6 km	MPC · JPL
140976	2001 VS_{121}	—	November 15, 2001	Palomar	NEAT	·	5.6 km	MPC · JPL
140977	2001 VG_{122}	—	November 13, 2001	Haleakala	NEAT	EUP	8.9 km	MPC · JPL
140978	2001 VP_{122}	—	November 15, 2001	Palomar	NEAT	·	4.3 km	MPC · JPL
140979	2001 VQ_{125}	—	November 11, 2001	Kitt Peak	Spacewatch	·	5.0 km	MPC · JPL
140980 Blanton	2001 VQ_{132}	Blanton	November 12, 2001	Apache Point	SDSS	·	2.6 km	MPC · JPL
140981	2001 WS_{2}	—	November 16, 2001	Kitt Peak	Spacewatch	·	3.4 km	MPC · JPL
140982	2001 WJ_{6}	—	November 17, 2001	Socorro	LINEAR	·	2.6 km	MPC · JPL
140983	2001 WO_{8}	—	November 17, 2001	Socorro	LINEAR	GEF	2.0 km	MPC · JPL
140984	2001 WN_{11}	—	November 17, 2001	Socorro	LINEAR	·	4.2 km	MPC · JPL
140985	2001 WZ_{11}	—	November 17, 2001	Socorro	LINEAR	·	4.3 km	MPC · JPL
140986	2001 WS_{12}	—	November 17, 2001	Socorro	LINEAR	·	3.2 km	MPC · JPL
140987	2001 WS_{13}	—	November 17, 2001	Socorro	LINEAR	·	5.4 km	MPC · JPL
140988	2001 WU_{16}	—	November 17, 2001	Socorro	LINEAR	·	8.8 km	MPC · JPL
140989	2001 WW_{17}	—	November 17, 2001	Socorro	LINEAR	·	2.8 km	MPC · JPL
140990	2001 WP_{19}	—	November 17, 2001	Socorro	LINEAR	fast	3.8 km	MPC · JPL
140991	2001 WG_{20}	—	November 17, 2001	Socorro	LINEAR	KOR	1.9 km	MPC · JPL
140992	2001 WU_{26}	—	November 17, 2001	Socorro	LINEAR	·	2.1 km	MPC · JPL
140993	2001 WB_{27}	—	November 17, 2001	Socorro	LINEAR	VER	6.2 km	MPC · JPL
140994	2001 WR_{27}	—	November 17, 2001	Socorro	LINEAR	·	6.0 km	MPC · JPL
140995	2001 WS_{27}	—	November 17, 2001	Socorro	LINEAR	·	2.8 km	MPC · JPL
140996	2001 WE_{28}	—	November 17, 2001	Socorro	LINEAR	·	3.1 km	MPC · JPL
140997	2001 WR_{28}	—	November 17, 2001	Socorro	LINEAR	·	6.7 km	MPC · JPL
140998	2001 WE_{29}	—	November 17, 2001	Socorro	LINEAR	·	7.4 km	MPC · JPL
140999	2001 WK_{29}	—	November 17, 2001	Socorro	LINEAR	·	8.3 km	MPC · JPL
141000	2001 WO_{29}	—	November 17, 2001	Socorro	LINEAR	·	6.9 km	MPC · JPL

back to top

== See also ==
- Meanings of minor-planet names: 140001–141000
