= List of minor planets: 137001–138000 =

The following is a partial list of minor planets, running from minor-planet number 137001 through 138000, inclusive. The primary data for this and other partial lists is based on JPL's "Small-Body Orbital Elements" and data available from the Minor Planet Center. Critical list information is also provided by the MPC, unless otherwise specified from Lowell Observatory. A detailed description of the table's columns and additional sources are given on the main page including a complete list of every page in this series, and a statistical break-up on the dynamical classification of minor planets.

Also see the summary list of all named bodies in numerical and alphabetical order, and the corresponding naming citations for the number range of this particular list. New namings may only be added to this list after official publication, as the preannouncement of names is condemned by the Working Group for Small Bodies Nomenclature of the International Astronomical Union.

Near-Earth obj.	MBA (inner)	MBA (outer)	Centaur
Mars-crosser	MBA (middle)	Jupiter trojan	Trans-Neptunian obj.
Unclassified

== 137001–137100 ==
Designation			Discovery			Properties		Ref
Permanent	Provisional	Named after	Date	Site	Discoverer(s)	Category	Diam.	Ref
137001	1998 SA_{81}	—	September 26, 1998	Socorro	LINEAR	·	1.9 km	MPC · JPL
137002	1998 SN_{83}	—	September 26, 1998	Socorro	LINEAR	·	2.7 km	MPC · JPL
137003	1998 SU_{90}	—	September 26, 1998	Socorro	LINEAR	·	1.8 km	MPC · JPL
137004	1998 SA_{92}	—	September 26, 1998	Socorro	LINEAR	EUN	1.4 km	MPC · JPL
137005	1998 SN_{93}	—	September 26, 1998	Socorro	LINEAR	MAS	1.1 km	MPC · JPL
137006	1998 SX_{94}	—	September 26, 1998	Socorro	LINEAR	·	2.2 km	MPC · JPL
137007	1998 SC_{108}	—	September 26, 1998	Socorro	LINEAR	·	2.7 km	MPC · JPL
137008	1998 SL_{108}	—	September 26, 1998	Socorro	LINEAR	(5)	2.2 km	MPC · JPL
137009	1998 SS_{120}	—	September 26, 1998	Socorro	LINEAR	·	2.8 km	MPC · JPL
137010	1998 ST_{121}	—	September 26, 1998	Socorro	LINEAR	·	1.7 km	MPC · JPL
137011	1998 SF_{122}	—	September 26, 1998	Socorro	LINEAR	T_{j} (2.95)	11 km	MPC · JPL
137012	1998 SY_{125}	—	September 26, 1998	Socorro	LINEAR	·	1.4 km	MPC · JPL
137013	1998 SF_{130}	—	September 26, 1998	Socorro	LINEAR	·	1.7 km	MPC · JPL
137014	1998 SM_{130}	—	September 26, 1998	Socorro	LINEAR	T_{j} (2.98) · 3:2	9.7 km	MPC · JPL
137015	1998 SW_{130}	—	September 26, 1998	Socorro	LINEAR	T_{j} (2.96)	8.0 km	MPC · JPL
137016	1998 SH_{131}	—	September 26, 1998	Socorro	LINEAR	(5)	2.0 km	MPC · JPL
137017	1998 SW_{139}	—	September 26, 1998	Socorro	LINEAR	·	2.2 km	MPC · JPL
137018	1998 SL_{160}	—	September 26, 1998	Socorro	LINEAR	·	1.8 km	MPC · JPL
137019	1998 SE_{168}	—	September 16, 1998	Anderson Mesa	LONEOS	·	2.0 km	MPC · JPL
137020	1998 TL	—	October 10, 1998	Oizumi	T. Kobayashi	·	1.9 km	MPC · JPL
137021	1998 TV_{2}	—	October 13, 1998	Caussols	ODAS	(5)	2.0 km	MPC · JPL
137022	1998 TF_{3}	—	October 14, 1998	Socorro	LINEAR	H	1.4 km	MPC · JPL
137023	1998 TB_{15}	—	October 14, 1998	Kitt Peak	Spacewatch	(5)	2.7 km	MPC · JPL
137024	1998 TH_{15}	—	October 14, 1998	Kitt Peak	Spacewatch	MAS	1 km	MPC · JPL
137025	1998 TT_{15}	—	October 15, 1998	Caussols	ODAS	·	2.0 km	MPC · JPL
137026	1998 TX_{16}	—	October 14, 1998	Caussols	ODAS	·	1.6 km	MPC · JPL
137027	1998 TH_{17}	—	October 15, 1998	Caussols	ODAS	NYS	1.7 km	MPC · JPL
137028	1998 TO_{17}	—	October 15, 1998	Caussols	ODAS	·	3.6 km	MPC · JPL
137029	1998 TB_{19}	—	October 14, 1998	Xinglong	SCAP	·	1.2 km	MPC · JPL
137030	1998 TR_{19}	—	October 15, 1998	Xinglong	SCAP	H	1.0 km	MPC · JPL
137031	1998 TJ_{22}	—	October 13, 1998	Kitt Peak	Spacewatch	·	1.6 km	MPC · JPL
137032	1998 UO_{1}	—	October 19, 1998	Socorro	LINEAR	APO +1km	1.1 km	MPC · JPL
137033	1998 UM_{6}	—	October 21, 1998	Kleť	Kleť	·	2.5 km	MPC · JPL
137034	1998 UD_{14}	—	October 23, 1998	Kitt Peak	Spacewatch	·	2.3 km	MPC · JPL
137035	1998 UE_{17}	—	October 17, 1998	Xinglong	SCAP	V	1.7 km	MPC · JPL
137036	1998 UC_{18}	—	October 19, 1998	Xinglong	SCAP	·	2.1 km	MPC · JPL
137037	1998 UM_{19}	—	October 28, 1998	Socorro	LINEAR	H	860 m	MPC · JPL
137038	1998 UA_{26}	—	October 18, 1998	La Silla	E. W. Elst	(5)	1.9 km	MPC · JPL
137039 Lisiguang	1998 UX_{31}	Lisiguang	October 26, 1998	Xinglong	SCAP	·	3.1 km	MPC · JPL
137040	1998 UY_{35}	—	October 28, 1998	Socorro	LINEAR	NYS	2.5 km	MPC · JPL
137041	1998 UG_{43}	—	October 28, 1998	Socorro	LINEAR	·	2.5 km	MPC · JPL
137042	1998 UT_{46}	—	October 24, 1998	Kitt Peak	Spacewatch	·	2.4 km	MPC · JPL
137043	1998 UL_{49}	—	October 23, 1998	Caussols	ODAS	(5)	1.7 km	MPC · JPL
137044	1998 UC_{50}	—	October 29, 1998	Socorro	LINEAR	AMO +1km	1.6 km	MPC · JPL
137045	1998 VE	—	November 7, 1998	Gekko	T. Kagawa	NYS	3.0 km	MPC · JPL
137046	1998 VE_{6}	—	November 11, 1998	Nachi-Katsuura	Y. Shimizu, T. Urata	·	4.4 km	MPC · JPL
137047	1998 VZ_{10}	—	November 10, 1998	Socorro	LINEAR	·	2.1 km	MPC · JPL
137048	1998 VP_{13}	—	November 10, 1998	Socorro	LINEAR	(5)	2.1 km	MPC · JPL
137049	1998 VB_{14}	—	November 10, 1998	Socorro	LINEAR	·	2.7 km	MPC · JPL
137050	1998 VL_{15}	—	November 10, 1998	Socorro	LINEAR	·	3.0 km	MPC · JPL
137051	1998 VA_{27}	—	November 10, 1998	Socorro	LINEAR	EUN	1.9 km	MPC · JPL
137052 Tjelvar	1998 VO_{33}	Tjelvar	November 15, 1998	La Silla	C.-I. Lagerkvist	APO +1km	1.4 km	MPC · JPL
137053	1998 VQ_{33}	—	November 11, 1998	Socorro	LINEAR	H	910 m	MPC · JPL
137054	1998 VB_{34}	—	November 11, 1998	Caussols	ODAS	·	2.3 km	MPC · JPL
137055	1998 VN_{36}	—	November 14, 1998	Socorro	LINEAR	EUN	1.8 km	MPC · JPL
137056	1998 VW_{43}	—	November 15, 1998	Kitt Peak	Spacewatch	·	3.1 km	MPC · JPL
137057	1998 VK_{44}	—	November 14, 1998	Anderson Mesa	LONEOS	H	980 m	MPC · JPL
137058	1998 VN_{45}	—	November 10, 1998	Anderson Mesa	LONEOS	·	1.7 km	MPC · JPL
137059	1998 VA_{49}	—	November 11, 1998	Xinglong	SCAP	·	2.6 km	MPC · JPL
137060	1998 VO_{50}	—	November 11, 1998	Socorro	LINEAR	·	2.8 km	MPC · JPL
137061	1998 VR_{50}	—	November 11, 1998	Socorro	LINEAR	·	2.1 km	MPC · JPL
137062	1998 WM	—	November 16, 1998	Socorro	LINEAR	APO +1km	1.3 km	MPC · JPL
137063	1998 WK_{1}	—	November 16, 1998	Monte Agliale	S. Donati	·	3.6 km	MPC · JPL
137064	1998 WP_{5}	—	November 19, 1998	Socorro	LINEAR	AMO	610 m	MPC · JPL
137065	1998 WH_{6}	—	November 21, 1998	Socorro	LINEAR	slow	2.0 km	MPC · JPL
137066 Gellért-hegy	1998 WR_{8}	Gellért-hegy	November 23, 1998	Piszkéstető	K. Sárneczky, L. Kiss	H	680 m	MPC · JPL
137067	1998 WQ_{9}	—	November 28, 1998	Višnjan Observatory	K. Korlević	·	2.1 km	MPC · JPL
137068	1998 WD_{13}	—	November 21, 1998	Socorro	LINEAR	·	2.2 km	MPC · JPL
137069	1998 WQ_{15}	—	November 21, 1998	Socorro	LINEAR	·	1.8 km	MPC · JPL
137070	1998 WE_{21}	—	November 18, 1998	Socorro	LINEAR	·	2.6 km	MPC · JPL
137071	1998 WD_{29}	—	November 23, 1998	Kitt Peak	Spacewatch	·	1.8 km	MPC · JPL
137072	1998 WM_{30}	—	November 26, 1998	Kitt Peak	Spacewatch	·	2.1 km	MPC · JPL
137073	1998 WG_{33}	—	November 20, 1998	Anderson Mesa	LONEOS	NYS	3.0 km	MPC · JPL
137074	1998 WJ_{34}	—	November 16, 1998	Kitt Peak	Spacewatch	·	1.6 km	MPC · JPL
137075	1998 WK_{38}	—	November 21, 1998	Kitt Peak	Spacewatch	·	2.1 km	MPC · JPL
137076	1998 XK_{3}	—	December 10, 1998	Ondřejov	L. Kotková	·	4.9 km	MPC · JPL
137077	1998 XE_{4}	—	December 8, 1998	Kitt Peak	Spacewatch	NYS	2.1 km	MPC · JPL
137078	1998 XZ_{4}	—	December 11, 1998	Socorro	LINEAR	APO +1km	1.9 km	MPC · JPL
137079	1998 XC_{5}	—	December 9, 1998	Farra d'Isonzo	Farra d'Isonzo	·	2.4 km	MPC · JPL
137080	1998 XD_{7}	—	December 8, 1998	Kitt Peak	Spacewatch	·	3.0 km	MPC · JPL
137081	1998 XO_{7}	—	December 8, 1998	Kitt Peak	Spacewatch	·	3.9 km	MPC · JPL
137082 Maurobachini	1998 XE_{9}	Maurobachini	December 12, 1998	San Marcello	L. Tesi, G. Forti	·	2.7 km	MPC · JPL
137083	1998 XZ_{13}	—	December 15, 1998	Caussols	ODAS	·	1.9 km	MPC · JPL
137084	1998 XS_{16}	—	December 15, 1998	Socorro	LINEAR	APO +1km	1.2 km	MPC · JPL
137085	1998 XD_{18}	—	December 8, 1998	Kitt Peak	Spacewatch	·	2.6 km	MPC · JPL
137086	1998 XX_{18}	—	December 10, 1998	Kitt Peak	Spacewatch	(5)	2.5 km	MPC · JPL
137087	1998 XC_{19}	—	December 10, 1998	Kitt Peak	Spacewatch	·	2.1 km	MPC · JPL
137088	1998 XT_{23}	—	December 11, 1998	Kitt Peak	Spacewatch	·	2.1 km	MPC · JPL
137089	1998 XT_{43}	—	December 14, 1998	Socorro	LINEAR	·	3.3 km	MPC · JPL
137090	1998 XZ_{57}	—	December 15, 1998	Socorro	LINEAR	·	3.1 km	MPC · JPL
137091	1998 XU_{63}	—	December 14, 1998	Socorro	LINEAR	·	3.9 km	MPC · JPL
137092	1998 XX_{68}	—	December 14, 1998	Socorro	LINEAR	·	4.2 km	MPC · JPL
137093	1998 XW_{70}	—	December 14, 1998	Socorro	LINEAR	(5)	2.2 km	MPC · JPL
137094	1998 XD_{84}	—	December 15, 1998	Socorro	LINEAR	·	3.1 km	MPC · JPL
137095	1998 XX_{86}	—	December 15, 1998	Socorro	LINEAR	(5)	3.5 km	MPC · JPL
137096	1998 XG_{97}	—	December 11, 1998	Mérida	Naranjo, O. A.	NEM	3.2 km	MPC · JPL
137097	1998 XP_{97}	—	December 8, 1998	Anderson Mesa	LONEOS	·	2.7 km	MPC · JPL
137098	1998 YP_{2}	—	December 17, 1998	Caussols	ODAS	·	2.9 km	MPC · JPL
137099	1998 YW_{3}	—	December 17, 1998	Socorro	LINEAR	APO +1km	560 m	MPC · JPL
137100	1998 YM_{7}	—	December 23, 1998	Brainerd	Wentworth, J.	·	3.9 km	MPC · JPL

== 137101–137200 ==
back to top

Designation			Discovery			Properties		Ref
Permanent	Provisional	Named after	Date	Site	Discoverer(s)	Category	Diam.	Ref
137101	1998 YN_{17}	—	December 22, 1998	Kitt Peak	Spacewatch	·	1.7 km	MPC · JPL
137102	1998 YL_{19}	—	December 25, 1998	Kitt Peak	Spacewatch	·	2.7 km	MPC · JPL
137103	1998 YP_{27}	—	December 27, 1998	Anderson Mesa	LONEOS	·	4.3 km	MPC · JPL
137104	1998 YU_{30}	—	December 16, 1998	Anderson Mesa	LONEOS	(5)	2.3 km	MPC · JPL
137105	1998 YK_{31}	—	December 22, 1998	Kitt Peak	Spacewatch	·	2.1 km	MPC · JPL
137106	1999 AQ_{5}	—	January 12, 1999	Oizumi	T. Kobayashi	·	2.3 km	MPC · JPL
137107	1999 AT_{6}	—	January 9, 1999	Višnjan Observatory	K. Korlević	·	2.8 km	MPC · JPL
137108	1999 AN_{10}	—	January 13, 1999	Socorro	LINEAR	APO +1km · PHA	870 m	MPC · JPL
137109	1999 AL_{11}	—	January 7, 1999	Kitt Peak	Spacewatch	·	1.8 km	MPC · JPL
137110	1999 AN_{12}	—	January 7, 1999	Kitt Peak	Spacewatch	·	2.8 km	MPC · JPL
137111	1999 AX_{18}	—	January 13, 1999	Kitt Peak	Spacewatch	HOF	3.7 km	MPC · JPL
137112	1999 AF_{20}	—	January 13, 1999	Kitt Peak	Spacewatch	·	2.3 km	MPC · JPL
137113	1999 AG_{20}	—	January 13, 1999	Kitt Peak	Spacewatch	·	3.5 km	MPC · JPL
137114	1999 AT_{24}	—	January 15, 1999	Caussols	ODAS	·	2.3 km	MPC · JPL
137115	1999 AZ_{30}	—	January 14, 1999	Kitt Peak	Spacewatch	·	3.8 km	MPC · JPL
137116	1999 BL_{2}	—	January 19, 1999	Caussols	ODAS	·	3.2 km	MPC · JPL
137117	1999 BK_{4}	—	January 19, 1999	San Marcello	A. Boattini, L. Tesi	·	4.1 km	MPC · JPL
137118	1999 BV_{4}	—	January 19, 1999	Caussols	ODAS	EUN	2.4 km	MPC · JPL
137119	1999 BU_{6}	—	January 21, 1999	Caussols	ODAS	·	4.5 km	MPC · JPL
137120	1999 BJ_{8}	—	January 20, 1999	Catalina	CSS	APO +1km · PHA	780 m	MPC · JPL
137121	1999 BJ_{11}	—	January 20, 1999	Caussols	ODAS	·	3.1 km	MPC · JPL
137122	1999 BX_{12}	—	January 24, 1999	Višnjan Observatory	K. Korlević	·	1.8 km	MPC · JPL
137123	1999 BX_{21}	—	January 18, 1999	Socorro	LINEAR	·	5.2 km	MPC · JPL
137124	1999 BH_{30}	—	January 19, 1999	Kitt Peak	Spacewatch	·	3.2 km	MPC · JPL
137125	1999 CT_{3}	—	February 10, 1999	Socorro	LINEAR	AMO	610 m	MPC · JPL
137126	1999 CF_{9}	—	February 12, 1999	Socorro	LINEAR	APO +1km · PHA	860 m	MPC · JPL
137127	1999 CV_{22}	—	February 10, 1999	Socorro	LINEAR	·	2.7 km	MPC · JPL
137128	1999 CQ_{31}	—	February 10, 1999	Socorro	LINEAR	MRX	2.3 km	MPC · JPL
137129	1999 CE_{34}	—	February 10, 1999	Socorro	LINEAR	MIS	4.5 km	MPC · JPL
137130	1999 CM_{38}	—	February 10, 1999	Socorro	LINEAR	(13314)	4.3 km	MPC · JPL
137131	1999 CN_{39}	—	February 10, 1999	Socorro	LINEAR	·	2.2 km	MPC · JPL
137132	1999 CL_{43}	—	February 10, 1999	Socorro	LINEAR	EUN	2.2 km	MPC · JPL
137133	1999 CE_{54}	—	February 10, 1999	Socorro	LINEAR	·	4.5 km	MPC · JPL
137134	1999 CJ_{60}	—	February 12, 1999	Socorro	LINEAR	·	2.9 km	MPC · JPL
137135	1999 CK_{63}	—	February 12, 1999	Socorro	LINEAR	·	4.2 km	MPC · JPL
137136	1999 CL_{88}	—	February 10, 1999	Socorro	LINEAR	·	3.1 km	MPC · JPL
137137	1999 CU_{95}	—	February 10, 1999	Socorro	LINEAR	·	3.7 km	MPC · JPL
137138	1999 CC_{98}	—	February 10, 1999	Socorro	LINEAR	·	4.1 km	MPC · JPL
137139	1999 CM_{98}	—	February 10, 1999	Socorro	LINEAR	·	2.1 km	MPC · JPL
137140	1999 CH_{105}	—	February 12, 1999	Socorro	LINEAR	EUN	2.5 km	MPC · JPL
137141	1999 CL_{112}	—	February 12, 1999	Socorro	LINEAR	·	3.9 km	MPC · JPL
137142	1999 CZ_{113}	—	February 12, 1999	Socorro	LINEAR	·	4.0 km	MPC · JPL
137143	1999 CT_{115}	—	February 12, 1999	Socorro	LINEAR	DOR	5.0 km	MPC · JPL
137144	1999 CL_{117}	—	February 12, 1999	Socorro	LINEAR	·	4.4 km	MPC · JPL
137145	1999 CA_{135}	—	February 7, 1999	Kitt Peak	Spacewatch	·	3.2 km	MPC · JPL
137146	1999 CS_{145}	—	February 8, 1999	Kitt Peak	Spacewatch	·	5.2 km	MPC · JPL
137147	1999 CW_{145}	—	February 8, 1999	Kitt Peak	Spacewatch	KOR	2.8 km	MPC · JPL
137148	1999 CA_{151}	—	February 9, 1999	Kitt Peak	Spacewatch	·	4.9 km	MPC · JPL
137149	1999 CB_{151}	—	February 9, 1999	Kitt Peak	Spacewatch	·	4.4 km	MPC · JPL
137150	1999 CX_{155}	—	February 12, 1999	Anderson Mesa	LONEOS	·	3.9 km	MPC · JPL
137151	1999 DO	—	February 16, 1999	Caussols	ODAS	·	3.9 km	MPC · JPL
137152	1999 DY_{4}	—	February 17, 1999	Socorro	LINEAR	·	2.9 km	MPC · JPL
137153	1999 EC	—	March 6, 1999	Prescott	P. G. Comba	·	3.6 km	MPC · JPL
137154	1999 EN	—	March 6, 1999	Kitt Peak	Spacewatch	·	1.6 km	MPC · JPL
137155	1999 EA_{4}	—	March 12, 1999	Kitt Peak	Spacewatch	·	790 m	MPC · JPL
137156	1999 EF_{4}	—	March 12, 1999	Kitt Peak	Spacewatch	·	1.5 km	MPC · JPL
137157	1999 EW_{10}	—	March 14, 1999	Kitt Peak	Spacewatch	·	2.7 km	MPC · JPL
137158	1999 FB	—	March 16, 1999	Socorro	LINEAR	APO +1km	930 m	MPC · JPL
137159	1999 FO_{1}	—	March 16, 1999	Kitt Peak	Spacewatch	KOR	2.5 km	MPC · JPL
137160	1999 FF_{32}	—	March 19, 1999	Socorro	LINEAR	·	4.6 km	MPC · JPL
137161	1999 FK_{34}	—	March 19, 1999	Socorro	LINEAR	·	5.3 km	MPC · JPL
137162	1999 FW_{35}	—	March 20, 1999	Socorro	LINEAR	·	3.9 km	MPC · JPL
137163	1999 FE_{40}	—	March 20, 1999	Socorro	LINEAR	·	3.6 km	MPC · JPL
137164	1999 FO_{51}	—	March 20, 1999	Socorro	LINEAR	·	5.0 km	MPC · JPL
137165 Annis	1999 FP_{68}	Annis	March 20, 1999	Apache Point	SDSS	·	3.8 km	MPC · JPL
137166 Netabahcall	1999 FS_{81}	Netabahcall	March 20, 1999	Apache Point	SDSS	EOS	2.9 km	MPC · JPL
137167	1999 GC_{3}	—	April 7, 1999	Kitt Peak	Spacewatch	·	3.3 km	MPC · JPL
137168	1999 GK_{3}	—	April 7, 1999	Kitt Peak	Spacewatch	·	4.7 km	MPC · JPL
137169	1999 GY_{9}	—	April 9, 1999	Mount Hopkins	Naranjo, O. A.	AGN	2.1 km	MPC · JPL
137170	1999 HF_{1}	—	April 20, 1999	Anderson Mesa	LONEOS	ATE +1km · moon	4.2 km	MPC · JPL
137171	1999 HM_{7}	—	April 19, 1999	Kitt Peak	Spacewatch	·	7.1 km	MPC · JPL
137172	1999 HJ_{9}	—	April 17, 1999	Socorro	LINEAR	·	4.3 km	MPC · JPL
137173	1999 JY_{4}	—	May 10, 1999	Socorro	LINEAR	·	1.3 km	MPC · JPL
137174	1999 JH_{5}	—	May 10, 1999	Socorro	LINEAR	BAR	2.0 km	MPC · JPL
137175	1999 JA_{11}	—	May 14, 1999	Socorro	LINEAR	APO	770 m	MPC · JPL
137176	1999 JZ_{11}	—	May 13, 1999	Socorro	LINEAR	·	1.6 km	MPC · JPL
137177	1999 JK_{12}	—	May 8, 1999	Catalina	CSS	·	2.8 km	MPC · JPL
137178	1999 JT_{15}	—	May 10, 1999	Socorro	LINEAR	·	1.4 km	MPC · JPL
137179	1999 JQ_{16}	—	May 15, 1999	Kitt Peak	Spacewatch	·	4.1 km	MPC · JPL
137180	1999 JF_{20}	—	May 10, 1999	Socorro	LINEAR	·	5.8 km	MPC · JPL
137181	1999 JA_{30}	—	May 10, 1999	Socorro	LINEAR	·	6.0 km	MPC · JPL
137182	1999 JG_{40}	—	May 10, 1999	Socorro	LINEAR	·	5.0 km	MPC · JPL
137183	1999 JX_{49}	—	May 10, 1999	Socorro	LINEAR	·	6.8 km	MPC · JPL
137184	1999 JG_{63}	—	May 10, 1999	Socorro	LINEAR	·	4.8 km	MPC · JPL
137185	1999 JT_{70}	—	May 12, 1999	Socorro	LINEAR	·	3.2 km	MPC · JPL
137186	1999 JT_{72}	—	May 12, 1999	Socorro	LINEAR	·	3.8 km	MPC · JPL
137187	1999 JC_{74}	—	May 12, 1999	Socorro	LINEAR	LIX	6.7 km	MPC · JPL
137188	1999 JE_{85}	—	May 14, 1999	Socorro	LINEAR	·	6.4 km	MPC · JPL
137189	1999 JU_{87}	—	May 12, 1999	Socorro	LINEAR	·	3.2 km	MPC · JPL
137190	1999 JC_{88}	—	May 12, 1999	Socorro	LINEAR	·	5.4 km	MPC · JPL
137191	1999 JG_{88}	—	May 12, 1999	Socorro	LINEAR	EOS	4.3 km	MPC · JPL
137192	1999 JL_{89}	—	May 12, 1999	Socorro	LINEAR	·	3.7 km	MPC · JPL
137193	1999 JB_{96}	—	May 12, 1999	Socorro	LINEAR	·	6.1 km	MPC · JPL
137194	1999 JJ_{103}	—	May 13, 1999	Socorro	LINEAR	·	1.3 km	MPC · JPL
137195	1999 JJ_{114}	—	May 13, 1999	Socorro	LINEAR	·	3.0 km	MPC · JPL
137196	1999 JS_{129}	—	May 12, 1999	Socorro	LINEAR	·	4.7 km	MPC · JPL
137197	1999 KA_{1}	—	May 17, 1999	Catalina	CSS	·	1.6 km	MPC · JPL
137198	1999 KR_{2}	—	May 16, 1999	Kitt Peak	Spacewatch	MAS	1.3 km	MPC · JPL
137199	1999 KX_{4}	—	May 20, 1999	Socorro	LINEAR	AMO +1km	1.4 km	MPC · JPL
137200	1999 KX_{12}	—	May 18, 1999	Socorro	LINEAR	·	2.6 km	MPC · JPL

== 137201–137300 ==
back to top

Designation			Discovery			Properties		Ref
Permanent	Provisional	Named after	Date	Site	Discoverer(s)	Category	Diam.	Ref
137201	1999 KF_{13}	—	May 18, 1999	Socorro	LINEAR	·	930 m	MPC · JPL
137202	1999 KJ_{13}	—	May 18, 1999	Socorro	LINEAR	·	6.3 km	MPC · JPL
137203	1999 LX	—	June 7, 1999	Prescott	P. G. Comba	·	1.4 km	MPC · JPL
137204	1999 LX_{2}	—	June 5, 1999	Kitt Peak	Spacewatch	·	7.4 km	MPC · JPL
137205	1999 LN_{11}	—	June 8, 1999	Socorro	LINEAR	·	4.5 km	MPC · JPL
137206	1999 LJ_{25}	—	June 9, 1999	Socorro	LINEAR	·	1.3 km	MPC · JPL
137207	1999 LW_{31}	—	June 14, 1999	Kitt Peak	Spacewatch	·	5.9 km	MPC · JPL
137208	1999 MC_{2}	—	June 20, 1999	Catalina	CSS	·	1.5 km	MPC · JPL
137209	1999 NU_{1}	—	July 12, 1999	Socorro	LINEAR	PHO	2.0 km	MPC · JPL
137210	1999 NO_{2}	—	July 12, 1999	Socorro	LINEAR	·	1.5 km	MPC · JPL
137211	1999 NM_{4}	—	July 13, 1999	Reedy Creek	J. Broughton	·	1.5 km	MPC · JPL
137212	1999 NB_{6}	—	July 13, 1999	Socorro	LINEAR	·	1.2 km	MPC · JPL
137213	1999 NX_{10}	—	July 13, 1999	Socorro	LINEAR	·	1.4 km	MPC · JPL
137214	1999 NF_{33}	—	July 14, 1999	Socorro	LINEAR	·	1.4 km	MPC · JPL
137215	1999 NU_{36}	—	July 14, 1999	Socorro	LINEAR	·	1.3 km	MPC · JPL
137216	1999 NV_{62}	—	July 13, 1999	Socorro	LINEAR	·	1.5 km	MPC · JPL
137217 Racah	1999 NH_{64}	Racah	July 8, 1999	Wise	Manulis, I., Gal-Yam, A.	V	1.2 km	MPC · JPL
137218	1999 OQ_{5}	—	July 21, 1999	Anderson Mesa	LONEOS	·	1.4 km	MPC · JPL
137219	1999 PX_{2}	—	August 8, 1999	Kitt Peak	Spacewatch	·	1.5 km	MPC · JPL
137220	1999 PF_{8}	—	August 12, 1999	Anderson Mesa	LONEOS	·	2.4 km	MPC · JPL
137221	1999 RX	—	September 4, 1999	Catalina	CSS	(1338) (FLO)	1.3 km	MPC · JPL
137222	1999 RB_{1}	—	September 4, 1999	Catalina	CSS	·	1.7 km	MPC · JPL
137223	1999 RM_{7}	—	September 3, 1999	Kitt Peak	Spacewatch	·	1.4 km	MPC · JPL
137224	1999 RW_{9}	—	September 7, 1999	Kitt Peak	Spacewatch	·	2.0 km	MPC · JPL
137225	1999 RB_{15}	—	September 7, 1999	Socorro	LINEAR	·	970 m	MPC · JPL
137226	1999 RA_{19}	—	September 7, 1999	Socorro	LINEAR	·	1.0 km	MPC · JPL
137227	1999 RR_{19}	—	September 7, 1999	Socorro	LINEAR	·	1.2 km	MPC · JPL
137228	1999 RT_{20}	—	September 7, 1999	Socorro	LINEAR	·	1.9 km	MPC · JPL
137229	1999 RD_{21}	—	September 7, 1999	Socorro	LINEAR	·	1.4 km	MPC · JPL
137230	1999 RG_{22}	—	September 7, 1999	Socorro	LINEAR	·	3.0 km	MPC · JPL
137231	1999 RQ_{22}	—	September 7, 1999	Socorro	LINEAR	PHO	1.5 km	MPC · JPL
137232	1999 RZ_{23}	—	September 7, 1999	Socorro	LINEAR	·	1.5 km	MPC · JPL
137233	1999 RE_{24}	—	September 7, 1999	Socorro	LINEAR	·	1.9 km	MPC · JPL
137234	1999 RT_{24}	—	September 7, 1999	Socorro	LINEAR	·	1.9 km	MPC · JPL
137235	1999 RY_{24}	—	September 7, 1999	Socorro	LINEAR	·	1.9 km	MPC · JPL
137236	1999 RA_{25}	—	September 7, 1999	Socorro	LINEAR	·	2.1 km	MPC · JPL
137237	1999 RG_{26}	—	September 7, 1999	Socorro	LINEAR	·	1.3 km	MPC · JPL
137238	1999 RN_{29}	—	September 8, 1999	Socorro	LINEAR	·	2.2 km	MPC · JPL
137239	1999 RB_{31}	—	September 8, 1999	Socorro	LINEAR	PHO	2.0 km	MPC · JPL
137240	1999 RD_{35}	—	September 7, 1999	Catalina	CSS	PHO	2.2 km	MPC · JPL
137241	1999 RV_{36}	—	September 11, 1999	Woomera	F. B. Zoltowski	·	1.5 km	MPC · JPL
137242	1999 RY_{53}	—	September 7, 1999	Socorro	LINEAR	·	1.1 km	MPC · JPL
137243	1999 RP_{59}	—	September 7, 1999	Socorro	LINEAR	V	1.1 km	MPC · JPL
137244	1999 RY_{59}	—	September 7, 1999	Socorro	LINEAR	·	2.3 km	MPC · JPL
137245	1999 RW_{62}	—	September 7, 1999	Socorro	LINEAR	·	1.5 km	MPC · JPL
137246	1999 RN_{63}	—	September 7, 1999	Socorro	LINEAR	fast	1.1 km	MPC · JPL
137247	1999 RG_{66}	—	September 7, 1999	Socorro	LINEAR	·	2.1 km	MPC · JPL
137248	1999 RD_{74}	—	September 7, 1999	Socorro	LINEAR	·	1.5 km	MPC · JPL
137249	1999 RS_{74}	—	September 13, 1999	Kitt Peak	Spacewatch	·	1.4 km	MPC · JPL
137250	1999 RO_{75}	—	September 7, 1999	Socorro	LINEAR	·	1.0 km	MPC · JPL
137251	1999 RC_{76}	—	September 7, 1999	Socorro	LINEAR	·	1.6 km	MPC · JPL
137252	1999 RG_{82}	—	September 7, 1999	Socorro	LINEAR	·	1.4 km	MPC · JPL
137253	1999 RO_{86}	—	September 7, 1999	Socorro	LINEAR	·	1.6 km	MPC · JPL
137254	1999 RL_{87}	—	September 7, 1999	Socorro	LINEAR	MAS	1.4 km	MPC · JPL
137255	1999 RO_{87}	—	September 7, 1999	Socorro	LINEAR	·	1.2 km	MPC · JPL
137256	1999 RS_{87}	—	September 7, 1999	Socorro	LINEAR	·	1.2 km	MPC · JPL
137257	1999 RQ_{88}	—	September 7, 1999	Socorro	LINEAR	·	1.7 km	MPC · JPL
137258	1999 RP_{95}	—	September 7, 1999	Socorro	LINEAR	·	1.8 km	MPC · JPL
137259	1999 RZ_{96}	—	September 7, 1999	Socorro	LINEAR	·	1.4 km	MPC · JPL
137260	1999 RM_{101}	—	September 8, 1999	Socorro	LINEAR	·	1.2 km	MPC · JPL
137261	1999 RS_{109}	—	September 8, 1999	Socorro	LINEAR	(2076)	1.4 km	MPC · JPL
137262	1999 RF_{120}	—	September 9, 1999	Socorro	LINEAR	·	1.3 km	MPC · JPL
137263	1999 RQ_{120}	—	September 9, 1999	Socorro	LINEAR	·	1.7 km	MPC · JPL
137264	1999 RT_{121}	—	September 9, 1999	Socorro	LINEAR	·	1.8 km	MPC · JPL
137265	1999 RO_{125}	—	September 9, 1999	Socorro	LINEAR	·	1.4 km	MPC · JPL
137266	1999 RU_{125}	—	September 9, 1999	Socorro	LINEAR	·	1.5 km	MPC · JPL
137267	1999 RS_{131}	—	September 9, 1999	Socorro	LINEAR	·	1.7 km	MPC · JPL
137268	1999 RO_{139}	—	September 9, 1999	Socorro	LINEAR	·	1.3 km	MPC · JPL
137269	1999 RH_{141}	—	September 9, 1999	Socorro	LINEAR	V	1.3 km	MPC · JPL
137270	1999 RW_{143}	—	September 9, 1999	Socorro	LINEAR	·	1.8 km	MPC · JPL
137271	1999 RC_{147}	—	September 9, 1999	Socorro	LINEAR	·	1.3 km	MPC · JPL
137272	1999 RU_{154}	—	September 9, 1999	Socorro	LINEAR	·	1.3 km	MPC · JPL
137273	1999 RX_{154}	—	September 9, 1999	Socorro	LINEAR	(2076)	1.4 km	MPC · JPL
137274	1999 RR_{156}	—	September 9, 1999	Socorro	LINEAR	·	1.5 km	MPC · JPL
137275	1999 RP_{160}	—	September 9, 1999	Socorro	LINEAR	V	1.2 km	MPC · JPL
137276	1999 RT_{162}	—	September 9, 1999	Socorro	LINEAR	·	1.4 km	MPC · JPL
137277	1999 RT_{164}	—	September 9, 1999	Socorro	LINEAR	·	1.8 km	MPC · JPL
137278	1999 RU_{165}	—	September 9, 1999	Socorro	LINEAR	·	1.6 km	MPC · JPL
137279	1999 RP_{168}	—	September 9, 1999	Socorro	LINEAR	·	1.8 km	MPC · JPL
137280	1999 RQ_{178}	—	September 9, 1999	Socorro	LINEAR	·	1.4 km	MPC · JPL
137281	1999 RL_{181}	—	September 9, 1999	Socorro	LINEAR	·	1.4 km	MPC · JPL
137282	1999 RJ_{182}	—	September 9, 1999	Socorro	LINEAR	V	1.1 km	MPC · JPL
137283	1999 RQ_{182}	—	September 9, 1999	Socorro	LINEAR	·	1.0 km	MPC · JPL
137284	1999 RZ_{182}	—	September 9, 1999	Socorro	LINEAR	·	960 m	MPC · JPL
137285	1999 RY_{184}	—	September 9, 1999	Socorro	LINEAR	·	1.1 km	MPC · JPL
137286	1999 RR_{186}	—	September 9, 1999	Socorro	LINEAR	·	1.2 km	MPC · JPL
137287	1999 RM_{188}	—	September 9, 1999	Socorro	LINEAR	·	1.4 km	MPC · JPL
137288	1999 RX_{190}	—	September 10, 1999	Socorro	LINEAR	·	1.7 km	MPC · JPL
137289	1999 RP_{193}	—	September 15, 1999	Kitt Peak	Spacewatch	·	1.7 km	MPC · JPL
137290	1999 RK_{202}	—	September 8, 1999	Socorro	LINEAR	·	1.8 km	MPC · JPL
137291	1999 RD_{206}	—	September 8, 1999	Socorro	LINEAR	·	1.5 km	MPC · JPL
137292	1999 RL_{206}	—	September 8, 1999	Socorro	LINEAR	PHO	1.5 km	MPC · JPL
137293	1999 RL_{208}	—	September 8, 1999	Socorro	LINEAR	V	1.4 km	MPC · JPL
137294	1999 RE_{215}	—	September 7, 1999	Mauna Kea	C. A. Trujillo, J. X. Luu, D. C. Jewitt	cubewano (cold)	172 km	MPC · JPL
137295	1999 RB_{216}	—	September 8, 1999	Mauna Kea	C. A. Trujillo, D. C. Jewitt, J. X. Luu	twotino	124 km	MPC · JPL
137296	1999 RL_{219}	—	September 6, 1999	Anderson Mesa	LONEOS	·	1.4 km	MPC · JPL
137297	1999 RC_{226}	—	September 4, 1999	Catalina	CSS	V	970 m	MPC · JPL
137298	1999 RF_{226}	—	September 4, 1999	Catalina	CSS	V	1.1 km	MPC · JPL
137299	1999 RK_{229}	—	September 7, 1999	Anderson Mesa	LONEOS	·	1.4 km	MPC · JPL
137300	1999 RC_{233}	—	September 8, 1999	Anderson Mesa	LONEOS	(2076)	1.7 km	MPC · JPL

== 137301–137400 ==
back to top

Designation			Discovery			Properties		Ref
Permanent	Provisional	Named after	Date	Site	Discoverer(s)	Category	Diam.	Ref
137301	1999 RP_{239}	—	September 8, 1999	Socorro	LINEAR	·	1.6 km	MPC · JPL
137302	1999 RB_{254}	—	September 4, 1999	Catalina	CSS	(2076)	1.1 km	MPC · JPL
137303	1999 SX_{9}	—	September 23, 1999	Monte Agliale	Santangelo, M. M. M.	·	1.2 km	MPC · JPL
137304	1999 SK_{12}	—	September 27, 1999	Anderson Mesa	LONEOS	·	1.3 km	MPC · JPL
137305	1999 SO_{14}	—	September 30, 1999	Catalina	CSS	MAS	1.1 km	MPC · JPL
137306	1999 SU_{16}	—	September 29, 1999	Catalina	CSS	·	1.6 km	MPC · JPL
137307	1999 SZ_{27}	—	September 27, 1999	Socorro	LINEAR	PHO	2.7 km	MPC · JPL
137308	1999 TF_{2}	—	October 2, 1999	Fountain Hills	C. W. Juels	·	1.4 km	MPC · JPL
137309	1999 TM_{5}	—	October 1, 1999	Višnjan Observatory	K. Korlević, M. Jurić	·	3.4 km	MPC · JPL
137310	1999 TF_{9}	—	October 7, 1999	Višnjan Observatory	K. Korlević, M. Jurić	(2076)	1.5 km	MPC · JPL
137311	1999 TX_{9}	—	October 9, 1999	Catalina	CSS	·	3.9 km	MPC · JPL
137312	1999 TK_{10}	—	October 10, 1999	Prescott	P. G. Comba	HIL · 3:2	8.2 km	MPC · JPL
137313	1999 TR_{12}	—	October 12, 1999	Prescott	P. G. Comba	MAS	910 m	MPC · JPL
137314	1999 TQ_{14}	—	October 12, 1999	Ondřejov	P. Kušnirák	·	910 m	MPC · JPL
137315 Wangshouwu	1999 TB_{20}	Wangshouwu	October 15, 1999	Xinglong	SCAP	·	1.5 km	MPC · JPL
137316	1999 TQ_{20}	—	October 5, 1999	Goodricke-Pigott	R. A. Tucker	NYS	1.7 km	MPC · JPL
137317	1999 TY_{21}	—	October 3, 1999	Kitt Peak	Spacewatch	·	1.8 km	MPC · JPL
137318	1999 TG_{22}	—	October 3, 1999	Kitt Peak	Spacewatch	(883)	1.2 km	MPC · JPL
137319	1999 TV_{23}	—	October 4, 1999	Kitt Peak	Spacewatch	·	1.8 km	MPC · JPL
137320	1999 TZ_{28}	—	October 4, 1999	Socorro	LINEAR	·	1.6 km	MPC · JPL
137321	1999 TN_{29}	—	October 4, 1999	Socorro	LINEAR	·	1.7 km	MPC · JPL
137322	1999 TR_{32}	—	October 4, 1999	Socorro	LINEAR	·	1.6 km	MPC · JPL
137323	1999 TF_{35}	—	October 4, 1999	Socorro	LINEAR	·	2.2 km	MPC · JPL
137324	1999 TX_{35}	—	October 6, 1999	Socorro	LINEAR	PHO	1.4 km	MPC · JPL
137325	1999 TQ_{37}	—	October 1, 1999	Catalina	CSS	V	1.4 km	MPC · JPL
137326	1999 TT_{40}	—	October 5, 1999	Catalina	CSS	·	1.6 km	MPC · JPL
137327	1999 TK_{41}	—	October 2, 1999	Kitt Peak	Spacewatch	·	1.6 km	MPC · JPL
137328	1999 TJ_{42}	—	October 3, 1999	Kitt Peak	Spacewatch	·	950 m	MPC · JPL
137329	1999 TO_{45}	—	October 3, 1999	Kitt Peak	Spacewatch	·	1.6 km	MPC · JPL
137330	1999 TS_{45}	—	October 3, 1999	Kitt Peak	Spacewatch	·	2.0 km	MPC · JPL
137331	1999 TX_{53}	—	October 6, 1999	Kitt Peak	Spacewatch	V	800 m	MPC · JPL
137332	1999 TS_{58}	—	October 6, 1999	Kitt Peak	Spacewatch	·	1.4 km	MPC · JPL
137333	1999 TN_{63}	—	October 7, 1999	Kitt Peak	Spacewatch	V	1.2 km	MPC · JPL
137334	1999 TC_{67}	—	October 8, 1999	Kitt Peak	Spacewatch	·	1.5 km	MPC · JPL
137335	1999 TE_{68}	—	October 8, 1999	Kitt Peak	Spacewatch	·	1.6 km	MPC · JPL
137336	1999 TG_{68}	—	October 8, 1999	Kitt Peak	Spacewatch	NYS	1.8 km	MPC · JPL
137337	1999 TX_{76}	—	October 10, 1999	Kitt Peak	Spacewatch	·	930 m	MPC · JPL
137338	1999 TH_{77}	—	October 10, 1999	Kitt Peak	Spacewatch	·	1.6 km	MPC · JPL
137339	1999 TD_{78}	—	October 11, 1999	Kitt Peak	Spacewatch	·	1.2 km	MPC · JPL
137340	1999 TB_{83}	—	October 12, 1999	Kitt Peak	Spacewatch	·	1.1 km	MPC · JPL
137341	1999 TD_{83}	—	October 12, 1999	Kitt Peak	Spacewatch	THM	3.4 km	MPC · JPL
137342	1999 TU_{85}	—	October 14, 1999	Kitt Peak	Spacewatch	MAS	800 m	MPC · JPL
137343	1999 TV_{85}	—	October 14, 1999	Kitt Peak	Spacewatch	·	950 m	MPC · JPL
137344	1999 TB_{89}	—	October 2, 1999	Socorro	LINEAR	·	1.2 km	MPC · JPL
137345	1999 TK_{89}	—	October 2, 1999	Socorro	LINEAR	·	1.2 km	MPC · JPL
137346	1999 TP_{90}	—	October 2, 1999	Socorro	LINEAR	(2076)	1.6 km	MPC · JPL
137347	1999 TL_{94}	—	October 2, 1999	Socorro	LINEAR	·	1.8 km	MPC · JPL
137348	1999 TZ_{94}	—	October 2, 1999	Socorro	LINEAR	·	1.6 km	MPC · JPL
137349	1999 TQ_{97}	—	October 2, 1999	Socorro	LINEAR	HIL · 3:2 · (3561)	11 km	MPC · JPL
137350	1999 TK_{100}	—	October 2, 1999	Socorro	LINEAR	·	1.7 km	MPC · JPL
137351	1999 TO_{100}	—	October 2, 1999	Socorro	LINEAR	·	1.4 km	MPC · JPL
137352	1999 TY_{103}	—	October 3, 1999	Socorro	LINEAR	·	1.7 km	MPC · JPL
137353	1999 TW_{104}	—	October 3, 1999	Socorro	LINEAR	·	1.6 km	MPC · JPL
137354	1999 TA_{105}	—	October 3, 1999	Socorro	LINEAR	·	1.1 km	MPC · JPL
137355	1999 TS_{106}	—	October 4, 1999	Socorro	LINEAR	·	1.6 km	MPC · JPL
137356	1999 TN_{108}	—	October 4, 1999	Socorro	LINEAR	·	1.6 km	MPC · JPL
137357	1999 TQ_{108}	—	October 4, 1999	Socorro	LINEAR	·	1.4 km	MPC · JPL
137358	1999 TE_{111}	—	October 4, 1999	Socorro	LINEAR	V	1.1 km	MPC · JPL
137359	1999 TS_{113}	—	October 4, 1999	Socorro	LINEAR	·	2.4 km	MPC · JPL
137360	1999 TF_{114}	—	October 4, 1999	Socorro	LINEAR	(2076)	1.8 km	MPC · JPL
137361	1999 TQ_{114}	—	October 4, 1999	Socorro	LINEAR	·	1.3 km	MPC · JPL
137362	1999 TC_{117}	—	October 4, 1999	Socorro	LINEAR	·	1.2 km	MPC · JPL
137363	1999 TD_{117}	—	October 4, 1999	Socorro	LINEAR	·	1.5 km	MPC · JPL
137364	1999 TZ_{118}	—	October 4, 1999	Socorro	LINEAR	·	1.3 km	MPC · JPL
137365	1999 TU_{120}	—	October 4, 1999	Socorro	LINEAR	NYS	1.4 km	MPC · JPL
137366	1999 TV_{120}	—	October 4, 1999	Socorro	LINEAR	·	1.6 km	MPC · JPL
137367	1999 TC_{123}	—	October 4, 1999	Socorro	LINEAR	·	1.6 km	MPC · JPL
137368	1999 TE_{124}	—	October 4, 1999	Socorro	LINEAR	·	1.4 km	MPC · JPL
137369	1999 TQ_{124}	—	October 4, 1999	Socorro	LINEAR	·	1.3 km	MPC · JPL
137370	1999 TA_{126}	—	October 4, 1999	Socorro	LINEAR	·	1.2 km	MPC · JPL
137371	1999 TF_{126}	—	October 4, 1999	Socorro	LINEAR	NYS	2.2 km	MPC · JPL
137372	1999 TM_{126}	—	October 4, 1999	Socorro	LINEAR	·	1.4 km	MPC · JPL
137373	1999 TD_{128}	—	October 4, 1999	Socorro	LINEAR	·	1.3 km	MPC · JPL
137374	1999 TJ_{128}	—	October 4, 1999	Socorro	LINEAR	·	1.2 km	MPC · JPL
137375	1999 TM_{131}	—	October 6, 1999	Socorro	LINEAR	·	1.4 km	MPC · JPL
137376	1999 TT_{133}	—	October 6, 1999	Socorro	LINEAR	·	1.5 km	MPC · JPL
137377	1999 TD_{135}	—	October 6, 1999	Socorro	LINEAR	·	1.0 km	MPC · JPL
137378	1999 TS_{136}	—	October 6, 1999	Socorro	LINEAR	·	1.9 km	MPC · JPL
137379	1999 TV_{138}	—	October 6, 1999	Socorro	LINEAR	MAS	1.2 km	MPC · JPL
137380	1999 TO_{144}	—	October 7, 1999	Socorro	LINEAR	fast	1.4 km	MPC · JPL
137381	1999 TQ_{149}	—	October 7, 1999	Socorro	LINEAR	·	1.6 km	MPC · JPL
137382	1999 TF_{150}	—	October 7, 1999	Socorro	LINEAR	·	1.9 km	MPC · JPL
137383	1999 TL_{151}	—	October 7, 1999	Socorro	LINEAR	·	1.2 km	MPC · JPL
137384	1999 TS_{154}	—	October 7, 1999	Socorro	LINEAR	·	3.2 km	MPC · JPL
137385	1999 TC_{155}	—	October 7, 1999	Socorro	LINEAR	·	1.2 km	MPC · JPL
137386	1999 TK_{155}	—	October 7, 1999	Socorro	LINEAR	·	1.3 km	MPC · JPL
137387	1999 TB_{156}	—	October 7, 1999	Socorro	LINEAR	MAS	1.8 km	MPC · JPL
137388	1999 TY_{156}	—	October 9, 1999	Socorro	LINEAR	·	1.3 km	MPC · JPL
137389	1999 TL_{157}	—	October 9, 1999	Socorro	LINEAR	·	1.3 km	MPC · JPL
137390	1999 TS_{157}	—	October 9, 1999	Socorro	LINEAR	·	1.3 km	MPC · JPL
137391	1999 TF_{158}	—	October 7, 1999	Socorro	LINEAR	·	1.6 km	MPC · JPL
137392	1999 TS_{159}	—	October 9, 1999	Socorro	LINEAR	·	1.3 km	MPC · JPL
137393	1999 TW_{159}	—	October 9, 1999	Socorro	LINEAR	NYS	1.4 km	MPC · JPL
137394	1999 TK_{162}	—	October 9, 1999	Socorro	LINEAR	·	1.6 km	MPC · JPL
137395	1999 TZ_{163}	—	October 9, 1999	Socorro	LINEAR	·	1.4 km	MPC · JPL
137396	1999 TY_{164}	—	October 10, 1999	Socorro	LINEAR	PHO	1.9 km	MPC · JPL
137397	1999 TH_{165}	—	October 10, 1999	Socorro	LINEAR	ERI	2.8 km	MPC · JPL
137398	1999 TW_{170}	—	October 10, 1999	Socorro	LINEAR	·	2.0 km	MPC · JPL
137399	1999 TY_{171}	—	October 10, 1999	Socorro	LINEAR	·	1.5 km	MPC · JPL
137400	1999 TC_{177}	—	October 10, 1999	Socorro	LINEAR	·	1.1 km	MPC · JPL

== 137401–137500 ==
back to top

Designation			Discovery			Properties		Ref
Permanent	Provisional	Named after	Date	Site	Discoverer(s)	Category	Diam.	Ref
137401	1999 TM_{177}	—	October 10, 1999	Socorro	LINEAR	·	2.3 km	MPC · JPL
137402	1999 TS_{177}	—	October 10, 1999	Socorro	LINEAR	·	1.1 km	MPC · JPL
137403	1999 TE_{178}	—	October 10, 1999	Socorro	LINEAR	·	1.7 km	MPC · JPL
137404	1999 TT_{178}	—	October 10, 1999	Socorro	LINEAR	·	2.8 km	MPC · JPL
137405	1999 TX_{179}	—	October 10, 1999	Socorro	LINEAR	·	2.3 km	MPC · JPL
137406	1999 TC_{180}	—	October 10, 1999	Socorro	LINEAR	·	1.8 km	MPC · JPL
137407	1999 TK_{180}	—	October 10, 1999	Socorro	LINEAR	V	1.1 km	MPC · JPL
137408	1999 TK_{183}	—	October 11, 1999	Socorro	LINEAR	·	1.3 km	MPC · JPL
137409	1999 TJ_{186}	—	October 12, 1999	Socorro	LINEAR	·	1.8 km	MPC · JPL
137410	1999 TQ_{186}	—	October 12, 1999	Socorro	LINEAR	V	920 m	MPC · JPL
137411	1999 TS_{188}	—	October 12, 1999	Socorro	LINEAR	·	1.4 km	MPC · JPL
137412	1999 TM_{189}	—	October 12, 1999	Socorro	LINEAR	·	1.5 km	MPC · JPL
137413	1999 TY_{189}	—	October 12, 1999	Socorro	LINEAR	·	1.5 km	MPC · JPL
137414	1999 TB_{190}	—	October 12, 1999	Socorro	LINEAR	·	1.8 km	MPC · JPL
137415	1999 TY_{192}	—	October 12, 1999	Socorro	LINEAR	·	2.5 km	MPC · JPL
137416	1999 TW_{193}	—	October 12, 1999	Socorro	LINEAR	·	1.9 km	MPC · JPL
137417	1999 TW_{194}	—	October 12, 1999	Socorro	LINEAR	·	1.9 km	MPC · JPL
137418	1999 TK_{195}	—	October 12, 1999	Socorro	LINEAR	·	1.4 km	MPC · JPL
137419	1999 TN_{195}	—	October 12, 1999	Socorro	LINEAR	·	2.1 km	MPC · JPL
137420	1999 TT_{195}	—	October 12, 1999	Socorro	LINEAR	V	1.2 km	MPC · JPL
137421	1999 TR_{199}	—	October 12, 1999	Socorro	LINEAR	·	2.4 km	MPC · JPL
137422	1999 TE_{202}	—	October 13, 1999	Socorro	LINEAR	·	1.2 km	MPC · JPL
137423	1999 TO_{202}	—	October 13, 1999	Socorro	LINEAR	·	3.0 km	MPC · JPL
137424	1999 TY_{202}	—	October 13, 1999	Socorro	LINEAR	·	1.8 km	MPC · JPL
137425	1999 TV_{205}	—	October 13, 1999	Socorro	LINEAR	·	1.1 km	MPC · JPL
137426	1999 TM_{207}	—	October 14, 1999	Socorro	LINEAR	PHO	4.0 km	MPC · JPL
137427	1999 TF_{211}	—	October 15, 1999	Socorro	LINEAR	T_{j} (2.97) · APO +1km · PHA	3.1 km	MPC · JPL
137428	1999 TJ_{211}	—	October 15, 1999	Socorro	LINEAR	·	1.1 km	MPC · JPL
137429	1999 TX_{212}	—	October 15, 1999	Socorro	LINEAR	·	1.4 km	MPC · JPL
137430	1999 TA_{213}	—	October 15, 1999	Socorro	LINEAR	·	2.3 km	MPC · JPL
137431	1999 TU_{215}	—	October 15, 1999	Socorro	LINEAR	·	1.4 km	MPC · JPL
137432	1999 TD_{216}	—	October 15, 1999	Socorro	LINEAR	·	1.6 km	MPC · JPL
137433	1999 TT_{216}	—	October 15, 1999	Socorro	LINEAR	·	1.1 km	MPC · JPL
137434	1999 TQ_{219}	—	October 1, 1999	Catalina	CSS	·	1.8 km	MPC · JPL
137435	1999 TE_{220}	—	October 1, 1999	Catalina	CSS	V	1.2 km	MPC · JPL
137436	1999 TE_{226}	—	October 2, 1999	Kitt Peak	Spacewatch	MAS	1.5 km	MPC · JPL
137437	1999 TG_{229}	—	October 4, 1999	Socorro	LINEAR	·	1.2 km	MPC · JPL
137438	1999 TP_{232}	—	October 5, 1999	Catalina	CSS	·	1.2 km	MPC · JPL
137439	1999 TL_{233}	—	October 3, 1999	Socorro	LINEAR	·	1.2 km	MPC · JPL
137440	1999 TX_{235}	—	October 3, 1999	Catalina	CSS	·	1.5 km	MPC · JPL
137441	1999 TG_{238}	—	October 4, 1999	Catalina	CSS	·	1.9 km	MPC · JPL
137442	1999 TJ_{239}	—	October 4, 1999	Catalina	CSS	·	2.8 km	MPC · JPL
137443	1999 TK_{240}	—	October 4, 1999	Catalina	CSS	·	2.9 km	MPC · JPL
137444	1999 TE_{245}	—	October 12, 1999	Socorro	LINEAR	PHO	3.4 km	MPC · JPL
137445	1999 TE_{247}	—	October 6, 1999	Socorro	LINEAR	V	1.3 km	MPC · JPL
137446	1999 TW_{252}	—	October 9, 1999	Socorro	LINEAR	·	1.3 km	MPC · JPL
137447	1999 TN_{254}	—	October 8, 1999	Socorro	LINEAR	PHO	1.7 km	MPC · JPL
137448	1999 TS_{257}	—	October 9, 1999	Socorro	LINEAR	·	1.6 km	MPC · JPL
137449	1999 TB_{264}	—	October 15, 1999	Kitt Peak	Spacewatch	·	1.1 km	MPC · JPL
137450	1999 TG_{273}	—	October 5, 1999	Socorro	LINEAR	PHO	2.6 km	MPC · JPL
137451	1999 TD_{280}	—	October 7, 1999	Socorro	LINEAR	·	1.3 km	MPC · JPL
137452	1999 TW_{281}	—	October 8, 1999	Socorro	LINEAR	·	2.5 km	MPC · JPL
137453	1999 TL_{283}	—	October 9, 1999	Socorro	LINEAR	·	1.3 km	MPC · JPL
137454	1999 TT_{283}	—	October 9, 1999	Socorro	LINEAR	·	1.8 km	MPC · JPL
137455	1999 TE_{285}	—	October 9, 1999	Socorro	LINEAR	·	1.7 km	MPC · JPL
137456	1999 TF_{288}	—	October 10, 1999	Socorro	LINEAR	·	1.5 km	MPC · JPL
137457	1999 TC_{289}	—	October 10, 1999	Socorro	LINEAR	·	1.5 km	MPC · JPL
137458	1999 TD_{290}	—	October 10, 1999	Socorro	LINEAR	·	1.9 km	MPC · JPL
137459	1999 TH_{293}	—	October 12, 1999	Socorro	LINEAR	·	1.5 km	MPC · JPL
137460	1999 TN_{313}	—	October 6, 1999	Socorro	LINEAR	·	3.5 km	MPC · JPL
137461	1999 TJ_{316}	—	October 10, 1999	Kitt Peak	Spacewatch	·	2.0 km	MPC · JPL
137462	1999 TN_{316}	—	October 10, 1999	Kitt Peak	Spacewatch	·	1.0 km	MPC · JPL
137463	1999 TT_{320}	—	October 10, 1999	Socorro	LINEAR	·	1.1 km	MPC · JPL
137464	1999 TV_{320}	—	October 10, 1999	Socorro	LINEAR	·	1.5 km	MPC · JPL
137465	1999 UG_{3}	—	October 19, 1999	Bergisch Gladbach	W. Bickel	·	1.8 km	MPC · JPL
137466	1999 UB_{4}	—	October 27, 1999	Starkenburg Observatory	Starkenburg	NYS	2.0 km	MPC · JPL
137467	1999 UN_{9}	—	October 29, 1999	Catalina	CSS	·	2.2 km	MPC · JPL
137468	1999 UT_{11}	—	October 29, 1999	Kitt Peak	Spacewatch	·	2.1 km	MPC · JPL
137469	1999 UE_{14}	—	October 29, 1999	Catalina	CSS	·	2.1 km	MPC · JPL
137470	1999 UX_{15}	—	October 29, 1999	Catalina	CSS	·	1.8 km	MPC · JPL
137471	1999 UN_{16}	—	October 29, 1999	Catalina	CSS	·	2.0 km	MPC · JPL
137472	1999 UW_{16}	—	October 29, 1999	Catalina	CSS	NYS	1.6 km	MPC · JPL
137473	1999 UY_{16}	—	October 30, 1999	Catalina	CSS	·	2.7 km	MPC · JPL
137474	1999 UT_{17}	—	October 30, 1999	Kitt Peak	Spacewatch	·	1.4 km	MPC · JPL
137475	1999 UD_{19}	—	October 30, 1999	Kitt Peak	Spacewatch	·	1.2 km	MPC · JPL
137476	1999 UC_{20}	—	October 31, 1999	Kitt Peak	Spacewatch	·	930 m	MPC · JPL
137477	1999 UG_{20}	—	October 31, 1999	Kitt Peak	Spacewatch	·	1.4 km	MPC · JPL
137478	1999 UP_{21}	—	October 31, 1999	Kitt Peak	Spacewatch	·	1.3 km	MPC · JPL
137479	1999 UC_{24}	—	October 28, 1999	Catalina	CSS	·	1.6 km	MPC · JPL
137480	1999 UD_{30}	—	October 31, 1999	Kitt Peak	Spacewatch	·	1.4 km	MPC · JPL
137481	1999 UJ_{30}	—	October 31, 1999	Kitt Peak	Spacewatch	·	1.2 km	MPC · JPL
137482	1999 UM_{30}	—	October 31, 1999	Kitt Peak	Spacewatch	·	1.1 km	MPC · JPL
137483	1999 UT_{32}	—	October 31, 1999	Kitt Peak	Spacewatch	NYS	1.4 km	MPC · JPL
137484	1999 UK_{34}	—	October 31, 1999	Kitt Peak	Spacewatch	NYS	1.2 km	MPC · JPL
137485	1999 UR_{35}	—	October 30, 1999	Kitt Peak	Spacewatch	·	1.2 km	MPC · JPL
137486	1999 UY_{35}	—	October 31, 1999	Kitt Peak	Spacewatch	·	1.4 km	MPC · JPL
137487	1999 UA_{37}	—	October 16, 1999	Kitt Peak	Spacewatch	·	1.3 km	MPC · JPL
137488	1999 UG_{44}	—	October 29, 1999	Catalina	CSS	·	1.3 km	MPC · JPL
137489	1999 UN_{45}	—	October 31, 1999	Catalina	CSS	·	1.3 km	MPC · JPL
137490	1999 UQ_{50}	—	October 30, 1999	Catalina	CSS	NYS	2.2 km	MPC · JPL
137491	1999 UD_{51}	—	October 31, 1999	Catalina	CSS	·	2.0 km	MPC · JPL
137492	1999 UM_{51}	—	October 31, 1999	Catalina	CSS	·	1.4 km	MPC · JPL
137493	1999 UO_{51}	—	October 31, 1999	Catalina	CSS	(2076)	1.7 km	MPC · JPL
137494	1999 UJ_{52}	—	October 31, 1999	Catalina	CSS	·	3.0 km	MPC · JPL
137495	1999 UH_{53}	—	October 21, 1999	Socorro	LINEAR	·	1.3 km	MPC · JPL
137496	1999 UM_{53}	—	October 19, 1999	Kitt Peak	Spacewatch	·	1.8 km	MPC · JPL
137497	1999 VH	—	November 1, 1999	Ondřejov	L. Kotková	·	1.2 km	MPC · JPL
137498	1999 VP_{8}	—	November 7, 1999	Gnosca	S. Sposetti	·	2.5 km	MPC · JPL
137499	1999 VS_{11}	—	November 5, 1999	Farpoint	Farpoint	·	2.1 km	MPC · JPL
137500	1999 VG_{13}	—	November 1, 1999	Socorro	LINEAR	PHO	2.0 km	MPC · JPL

== 137501–137600 ==
back to top

Designation			Discovery			Properties		Ref
Permanent	Provisional	Named after	Date	Site	Discoverer(s)	Category	Diam.	Ref
137501	1999 VE_{15}	—	November 2, 1999	Kitt Peak	Spacewatch	·	1.0 km	MPC · JPL
137502	1999 VP_{19}	—	November 10, 1999	Višnjan Observatory	K. Korlević	·	1.4 km	MPC · JPL
137503	1999 VZ_{19}	—	November 10, 1999	Višnjan Observatory	K. Korlević	·	1.5 km	MPC · JPL
137504	1999 VO_{21}	—	November 12, 1999	Višnjan Observatory	K. Korlević	·	1.5 km	MPC · JPL
137505	1999 VZ_{21}	—	November 12, 1999	Višnjan Observatory	K. Korlević	NYS	1.8 km	MPC · JPL
137506	1999 VA_{22}	—	November 12, 1999	Višnjan Observatory	K. Korlević	·	1.3 km	MPC · JPL
137507	1999 VH_{23}	—	November 8, 1999	Majorca	R. Pacheco, Á. López J.	·	1.6 km	MPC · JPL
137508	1999 VV_{27}	—	November 3, 1999	Catalina	CSS	·	1.6 km	MPC · JPL
137509	1999 VA_{29}	—	November 3, 1999	Socorro	LINEAR	·	1.7 km	MPC · JPL
137510	1999 VL_{30}	—	November 3, 1999	Socorro	LINEAR	·	2.6 km	MPC · JPL
137511	1999 VW_{32}	—	November 3, 1999	Socorro	LINEAR	·	1.6 km	MPC · JPL
137512	1999 VZ_{33}	—	November 3, 1999	Socorro	LINEAR	V	1.2 km	MPC · JPL
137513	1999 VY_{35}	—	November 3, 1999	Socorro	LINEAR	·	2.2 km	MPC · JPL
137514	1999 VG_{37}	—	November 3, 1999	Socorro	LINEAR	·	1.5 km	MPC · JPL
137515	1999 VC_{38}	—	November 3, 1999	Socorro	LINEAR	NYS	1.9 km	MPC · JPL
137516	1999 VY_{41}	—	November 4, 1999	Kitt Peak	Spacewatch	·	1.3 km	MPC · JPL
137517	1999 VT_{42}	—	November 4, 1999	Kitt Peak	Spacewatch	·	1.1 km	MPC · JPL
137518	1999 VA_{43}	—	November 4, 1999	Kitt Peak	Spacewatch	NYS	1.3 km	MPC · JPL
137519	1999 VW_{43}	—	November 1, 1999	Catalina	CSS	·	1.1 km	MPC · JPL
137520	1999 VP_{44}	—	November 4, 1999	Catalina	CSS	·	1.8 km	MPC · JPL
137521	1999 VZ_{46}	—	November 4, 1999	Socorro	LINEAR	·	1.5 km	MPC · JPL
137522	1999 VD_{48}	—	November 3, 1999	Socorro	LINEAR	·	1.5 km	MPC · JPL
137523	1999 VJ_{49}	—	November 3, 1999	Socorro	LINEAR	V	1.2 km	MPC · JPL
137524	1999 VM_{49}	—	November 3, 1999	Socorro	LINEAR	·	1.4 km	MPC · JPL
137525	1999 VM_{50}	—	November 3, 1999	Socorro	LINEAR	NYS	1.4 km	MPC · JPL
137526	1999 VB_{51}	—	November 3, 1999	Socorro	LINEAR	·	1.8 km	MPC · JPL
137527	1999 VA_{52}	—	November 3, 1999	Socorro	LINEAR	·	1.8 km	MPC · JPL
137528	1999 VP_{54}	—	November 4, 1999	Socorro	LINEAR	·	2.0 km	MPC · JPL
137529	1999 VR_{54}	—	November 4, 1999	Socorro	LINEAR	NYS	1.5 km	MPC · JPL
137530	1999 VH_{58}	—	November 4, 1999	Socorro	LINEAR	·	2.8 km	MPC · JPL
137531	1999 VX_{58}	—	November 4, 1999	Socorro	LINEAR	·	1.5 km	MPC · JPL
137532	1999 VL_{59}	—	November 4, 1999	Socorro	LINEAR	3:2	8.4 km	MPC · JPL
137533	1999 VQ_{61}	—	November 4, 1999	Socorro	LINEAR	·	1.8 km	MPC · JPL
137534	1999 VT_{61}	—	November 4, 1999	Socorro	LINEAR	·	1.5 km	MPC · JPL
137535	1999 VE_{62}	—	November 4, 1999	Socorro	LINEAR	MAS	1.2 km	MPC · JPL
137536	1999 VC_{63}	—	November 4, 1999	Socorro	LINEAR	·	1.4 km	MPC · JPL
137537	1999 VR_{66}	—	November 4, 1999	Socorro	LINEAR	V	880 m	MPC · JPL
137538	1999 VJ_{67}	—	November 4, 1999	Socorro	LINEAR	NYS	1.7 km	MPC · JPL
137539	1999 VD_{69}	—	November 4, 1999	Socorro	LINEAR	·	1.5 km	MPC · JPL
137540	1999 VE_{69}	—	November 4, 1999	Socorro	LINEAR	·	1.1 km	MPC · JPL
137541	1999 VN_{70}	—	November 4, 1999	Socorro	LINEAR	·	1.3 km	MPC · JPL
137542	1999 VQ_{70}	—	November 4, 1999	Socorro	LINEAR	·	1.6 km	MPC · JPL
137543	1999 VW_{70}	—	November 4, 1999	Socorro	LINEAR	·	1.1 km	MPC · JPL
137544	1999 VG_{72}	—	November 12, 1999	Xinglong	SCAP	·	2.1 km	MPC · JPL
137545	1999 VP_{75}	—	November 5, 1999	Kitt Peak	Spacewatch	V	950 m	MPC · JPL
137546	1999 VY_{76}	—	November 5, 1999	Kitt Peak	Spacewatch	·	1.1 km	MPC · JPL
137547	1999 VZ_{76}	—	November 5, 1999	Kitt Peak	Spacewatch	·	1.6 km	MPC · JPL
137548	1999 VE_{77}	—	November 5, 1999	Kitt Peak	Spacewatch	·	2.8 km	MPC · JPL
137549	1999 VW_{77}	—	November 3, 1999	Socorro	LINEAR	·	1.4 km	MPC · JPL
137550	1999 VV_{78}	—	November 4, 1999	Socorro	LINEAR	V	1.2 km	MPC · JPL
137551	1999 VL_{84}	—	November 6, 1999	Kitt Peak	Spacewatch	·	1.8 km	MPC · JPL
137552	1999 VG_{85}	—	November 6, 1999	Kitt Peak	Spacewatch	V	1.2 km	MPC · JPL
137553	1999 VY_{85}	—	November 4, 1999	Socorro	LINEAR	·	1.8 km	MPC · JPL
137554	1999 VA_{86}	—	November 4, 1999	Socorro	LINEAR	ERI	2.4 km	MPC · JPL
137555	1999 VE_{86}	—	November 4, 1999	Socorro	LINEAR	NYS	2.7 km	MPC · JPL
137556	1999 VA_{89}	—	November 4, 1999	Socorro	LINEAR	·	1.2 km	MPC · JPL
137557	1999 VH_{89}	—	November 4, 1999	Socorro	LINEAR	NYS	1.4 km	MPC · JPL
137558	1999 VY_{89}	—	November 5, 1999	Socorro	LINEAR	V	1.1 km	MPC · JPL
137559	1999 VE_{90}	—	November 5, 1999	Socorro	LINEAR	·	1.2 km	MPC · JPL
137560	1999 VL_{92}	—	November 9, 1999	Socorro	LINEAR	V	1.1 km	MPC · JPL
137561	1999 VH_{94}	—	November 9, 1999	Socorro	LINEAR	·	2.6 km	MPC · JPL
137562	1999 VX_{95}	—	November 9, 1999	Socorro	LINEAR	NYS	1.7 km	MPC · JPL
137563	1999 VB_{96}	—	November 9, 1999	Socorro	LINEAR	·	1.1 km	MPC · JPL
137564	1999 VD_{100}	—	November 9, 1999	Socorro	LINEAR	·	1.5 km	MPC · JPL
137565	1999 VW_{101}	—	November 9, 1999	Socorro	LINEAR	·	2.1 km	MPC · JPL
137566	1999 VO_{104}	—	November 9, 1999	Socorro	LINEAR	V	790 m	MPC · JPL
137567	1999 VZ_{104}	—	November 9, 1999	Socorro	LINEAR	NYS	1.7 km	MPC · JPL
137568	1999 VW_{106}	—	November 9, 1999	Socorro	LINEAR	·	1.6 km	MPC · JPL
137569	1999 VJ_{108}	—	November 9, 1999	Socorro	LINEAR	·	1.8 km	MPC · JPL
137570	1999 VF_{109}	—	November 9, 1999	Socorro	LINEAR	·	1.8 km	MPC · JPL
137571	1999 VT_{110}	—	November 9, 1999	Socorro	LINEAR	·	1.0 km	MPC · JPL
137572	1999 VC_{112}	—	November 9, 1999	Socorro	LINEAR	·	1.0 km	MPC · JPL
137573	1999 VR_{113}	—	November 4, 1999	Catalina	CSS	·	1.6 km	MPC · JPL
137574	1999 VF_{120}	—	November 4, 1999	Kitt Peak	Spacewatch	·	1.9 km	MPC · JPL
137575	1999 VT_{121}	—	November 4, 1999	Kitt Peak	Spacewatch	·	1.3 km	MPC · JPL
137576	1999 VZ_{123}	—	November 5, 1999	Kitt Peak	Spacewatch	·	1.7 km	MPC · JPL
137577	1999 VW_{125}	—	November 6, 1999	Kitt Peak	Spacewatch	NYS	2.0 km	MPC · JPL
137578	1999 VN_{127}	—	November 9, 1999	Kitt Peak	Spacewatch	·	960 m	MPC · JPL
137579	1999 VH_{130}	—	November 12, 1999	Kitt Peak	Spacewatch	·	1.0 km	MPC · JPL
137580	1999 VO_{136}	—	November 9, 1999	Socorro	LINEAR	·	2.2 km	MPC · JPL
137581	1999 VV_{137}	—	November 12, 1999	Socorro	LINEAR	·	1.3 km	MPC · JPL
137582	1999 VE_{139}	—	November 9, 1999	Kitt Peak	Spacewatch	NYS	1.8 km	MPC · JPL
137583	1999 VE_{141}	—	November 10, 1999	Kitt Peak	Spacewatch	·	1.5 km	MPC · JPL
137584	1999 VK_{142}	—	November 10, 1999	Kitt Peak	Spacewatch	MAS	1.0 km	MPC · JPL
137585	1999 VJ_{145}	—	November 9, 1999	Socorro	LINEAR	·	1.0 km	MPC · JPL
137586	1999 VS_{145}	—	November 9, 1999	Socorro	LINEAR	·	1.7 km	MPC · JPL
137587	1999 VU_{146}	—	November 12, 1999	Socorro	LINEAR	MAS	1.3 km	MPC · JPL
137588	1999 VN_{147}	—	November 13, 1999	Socorro	LINEAR	·	1.1 km	MPC · JPL
137589	1999 VR_{149}	—	November 14, 1999	Socorro	LINEAR	·	1.8 km	MPC · JPL
137590	1999 VF_{151}	—	November 14, 1999	Socorro	LINEAR	·	1.3 km	MPC · JPL
137591	1999 VN_{153}	—	November 11, 1999	Kitt Peak	Spacewatch	·	1.8 km	MPC · JPL
137592	1999 VU_{153}	—	November 13, 1999	Kitt Peak	Spacewatch	·	1.3 km	MPC · JPL
137593	1999 VM_{158}	—	November 14, 1999	Socorro	LINEAR	V	1.1 km	MPC · JPL
137594	1999 VA_{161}	—	November 14, 1999	Socorro	LINEAR	·	2.5 km	MPC · JPL
137595	1999 VP_{161}	—	November 14, 1999	Socorro	LINEAR	NYS	1.7 km	MPC · JPL
137596	1999 VV_{161}	—	November 14, 1999	Socorro	LINEAR	·	1.8 km	MPC · JPL
137597	1999 VW_{161}	—	November 14, 1999	Socorro	LINEAR	·	1.7 km	MPC · JPL
137598	1999 VA_{164}	—	November 14, 1999	Socorro	LINEAR	NYS	2.2 km	MPC · JPL
137599	1999 VN_{164}	—	November 14, 1999	Socorro	LINEAR	·	2.3 km	MPC · JPL
137600	1999 VJ_{169}	—	November 14, 1999	Socorro	LINEAR	NYS	1.3 km	MPC · JPL

== 137601–137700 ==
back to top

Designation			Discovery			Properties		Ref
Permanent	Provisional	Named after	Date	Site	Discoverer(s)	Category	Diam.	Ref
137601	1999 VO_{170}	—	November 14, 1999	Socorro	LINEAR	·	1.2 km	MPC · JPL
137602	1999 VF_{171}	—	November 14, 1999	Socorro	LINEAR	·	1.9 km	MPC · JPL
137603	1999 VJ_{171}	—	November 14, 1999	Socorro	LINEAR	·	1.2 km	MPC · JPL
137604	1999 VP_{173}	—	November 15, 1999	Socorro	LINEAR	(2076)	1.2 km	MPC · JPL
137605	1999 VK_{174}	—	November 11, 1999	Anderson Mesa	LONEOS	PHO	3.7 km	MPC · JPL
137606	1999 VJ_{175}	—	November 10, 1999	Kitt Peak	Spacewatch	·	1.6 km	MPC · JPL
137607	1999 VC_{176}	—	November 2, 1999	Catalina	CSS	·	1.5 km	MPC · JPL
137608	1999 VZ_{176}	—	November 5, 1999	Socorro	LINEAR	·	1.9 km	MPC · JPL
137609	1999 VF_{180}	—	November 5, 1999	Socorro	LINEAR	·	1.3 km	MPC · JPL
137610	1999 VB_{183}	—	November 9, 1999	Socorro	LINEAR	·	1.6 km	MPC · JPL
137611	1999 VU_{183}	—	November 12, 1999	Socorro	LINEAR	·	1.6 km	MPC · JPL
137612	1999 VQ_{187}	—	November 15, 1999	Socorro	LINEAR	·	2.5 km	MPC · JPL
137613	1999 VW_{188}	—	November 15, 1999	Socorro	LINEAR	·	1.7 km	MPC · JPL
137614	1999 VN_{189}	—	November 15, 1999	Socorro	LINEAR	·	2.7 km	MPC · JPL
137615	1999 VR_{191}	—	November 12, 1999	Socorro	LINEAR	·	1.3 km	MPC · JPL
137616	1999 VJ_{192}	—	November 1, 1999	Anderson Mesa	LONEOS	·	2.3 km	MPC · JPL
137617	1999 VJ_{195}	—	November 3, 1999	Catalina	CSS	V	1.7 km	MPC · JPL
137618	1999 VT_{197}	—	November 3, 1999	Catalina	CSS	·	1.5 km	MPC · JPL
137619	1999 VG_{204}	—	November 9, 1999	Socorro	LINEAR	·	1.1 km	MPC · JPL
137620	1999 VD_{207}	—	November 11, 1999	Catalina	CSS	NYS	2.8 km	MPC · JPL
137621	1999 VL_{207}	—	November 12, 1999	Socorro	LINEAR	·	1.0 km	MPC · JPL
137622	1999 VR_{207}	—	November 13, 1999	Kitt Peak	Spacewatch	·	2.0 km	MPC · JPL
137623	1999 VB_{211}	—	November 13, 1999	Anderson Mesa	LONEOS	·	2.2 km	MPC · JPL
137624	1999 VQ_{213}	—	November 14, 1999	Anderson Mesa	LONEOS	·	2.5 km	MPC · JPL
137625	1999 VT_{219}	—	November 5, 1999	Socorro	LINEAR	·	1.4 km	MPC · JPL
137626	1999 VG_{220}	—	November 3, 1999	Kitt Peak	Spacewatch	(2076)	1.3 km	MPC · JPL
137627	1999 VS_{220}	—	November 3, 1999	Socorro	LINEAR	·	1.2 km	MPC · JPL
137628	1999 VH_{222}	—	November 4, 1999	Kitt Peak	Spacewatch	NYS	1.2 km	MPC · JPL
137629	1999 VN_{226}	—	November 13, 1999	Catalina	CSS	CYB	9.1 km	MPC · JPL
137630	1999 WV	—	November 18, 1999	Oohira	T. Urata	·	1.4 km	MPC · JPL
137631	1999 WU_{1}	—	November 25, 1999	Višnjan Observatory	K. Korlević	·	1.7 km	MPC · JPL
137632 Ramsauer	1999 WG_{2}	Ramsauer	November 26, 1999	Linz	E. Meyer	·	1.0 km	MPC · JPL
137633	1999 WR_{2}	—	November 26, 1999	Monte Agliale	Santangelo, M. M. M.	NYS	1.9 km	MPC · JPL
137634	1999 WF_{5}	—	November 28, 1999	Kitt Peak	Spacewatch	·	1.4 km	MPC · JPL
137635	1999 WD_{8}	—	November 28, 1999	Kvistaberg	Uppsala-DLR Asteroid Survey	·	3.1 km	MPC · JPL
137636	1999 WS_{8}	—	November 28, 1999	Gnosca	S. Sposetti	·	1.6 km	MPC · JPL
137637	1999 WS_{10}	—	November 28, 1999	Kitt Peak	Spacewatch	·	1.2 km	MPC · JPL
137638	1999 WS_{11}	—	November 28, 1999	Kitt Peak	Spacewatch	·	1.5 km	MPC · JPL
137639	1999 WC_{12}	—	November 28, 1999	Kitt Peak	Spacewatch	·	1.3 km	MPC · JPL
137640	1999 WW_{12}	—	November 30, 1999	Kitt Peak	Spacewatch	·	1.4 km	MPC · JPL
137641	1999 WE_{13}	—	November 30, 1999	Kitt Peak	Spacewatch	·	1.7 km	MPC · JPL
137642	1999 WU_{14}	—	November 28, 1999	Kitt Peak	Spacewatch	·	1.3 km	MPC · JPL
137643	1999 WC_{15}	—	November 29, 1999	Kitt Peak	Spacewatch	NYS	1.1 km	MPC · JPL
137644	1999 WJ_{15}	—	November 29, 1999	Kitt Peak	Spacewatch	·	2.1 km	MPC · JPL
137645	1999 WZ_{15}	—	November 29, 1999	Kitt Peak	Spacewatch	·	2.4 km	MPC · JPL
137646	1999 WB_{16}	—	November 29, 1999	Kitt Peak	Spacewatch	MAS	1.3 km	MPC · JPL
137647	1999 WR_{16}	—	November 30, 1999	Kitt Peak	Spacewatch	·	1.0 km	MPC · JPL
137648	1999 WF_{19}	—	November 30, 1999	Kitt Peak	Spacewatch	·	1.4 km	MPC · JPL
137649	1999 WJ_{20}	—	November 16, 1999	Socorro	LINEAR	·	1.5 km	MPC · JPL
137650	1999 WZ_{24}	—	November 28, 1999	Kitt Peak	Spacewatch	·	1.8 km	MPC · JPL
137651	1999 WG_{25}	—	November 29, 1999	Kitt Peak	Spacewatch	·	1.4 km	MPC · JPL
137652	1999 WJ_{25}	—	November 29, 1999	Kitt Peak	Spacewatch	·	1.4 km	MPC · JPL
137653	1999 XY	—	December 2, 1999	Oizumi	T. Kobayashi	·	5.7 km	MPC · JPL
137654	1999 XP_{2}	—	December 3, 1999	Kitt Peak	Spacewatch	NYS	1.4 km	MPC · JPL
137655	1999 XE_{3}	—	December 4, 1999	Catalina	CSS	V	1.8 km	MPC · JPL
137656	1999 XU_{6}	—	December 4, 1999	Catalina	CSS	NYS	2.0 km	MPC · JPL
137657	1999 XZ_{8}	—	December 5, 1999	Socorro	LINEAR	PHO	2.2 km	MPC · JPL
137658	1999 XZ_{9}	—	December 5, 1999	Kitt Peak	Spacewatch	·	1.7 km	MPC · JPL
137659	1999 XD_{12}	—	December 6, 1999	Catalina	CSS	·	2.9 km	MPC · JPL
137660	1999 XO_{12}	—	December 5, 1999	Socorro	LINEAR	·	1.8 km	MPC · JPL
137661	1999 XF_{15}	—	December 6, 1999	Socorro	LINEAR	·	2.4 km	MPC · JPL
137662	1999 XJ_{16}	—	December 7, 1999	Socorro	LINEAR	PHO	4.0 km	MPC · JPL
137663	1999 XH_{19}	—	December 3, 1999	Socorro	LINEAR	V	1.2 km	MPC · JPL
137664	1999 XJ_{22}	—	December 6, 1999	Socorro	LINEAR	·	2.0 km	MPC · JPL
137665	1999 XR_{24}	—	December 6, 1999	Socorro	LINEAR	·	1.5 km	MPC · JPL
137666	1999 XG_{25}	—	December 6, 1999	Socorro	LINEAR	·	2.4 km	MPC · JPL
137667	1999 XW_{25}	—	December 6, 1999	Socorro	LINEAR	·	1.3 km	MPC · JPL
137668	1999 XK_{28}	—	December 6, 1999	Socorro	LINEAR	NYS	1.7 km	MPC · JPL
137669	1999 XX_{28}	—	December 6, 1999	Socorro	LINEAR	·	1.4 km	MPC · JPL
137670	1999 XE_{33}	—	December 6, 1999	Socorro	LINEAR	·	2.7 km	MPC · JPL
137671	1999 XP_{35}	—	December 6, 1999	Socorro	LINEAR	AMO	640 m	MPC · JPL
137672	1999 XP_{40}	—	December 7, 1999	Socorro	LINEAR	PHO	1.9 km	MPC · JPL
137673	1999 XX_{40}	—	December 7, 1999	Socorro	LINEAR	·	1.3 km	MPC · JPL
137674	1999 XA_{42}	—	December 7, 1999	Socorro	LINEAR	·	1.3 km	MPC · JPL
137675	1999 XF_{42}	—	December 7, 1999	Socorro	LINEAR	NYS	1.9 km	MPC · JPL
137676	1999 XH_{42}	—	December 7, 1999	Socorro	LINEAR	NYS	2.0 km	MPC · JPL
137677	1999 XA_{44}	—	December 7, 1999	Socorro	LINEAR	NYS	1.6 km	MPC · JPL
137678	1999 XW_{44}	—	December 7, 1999	Socorro	LINEAR	·	1.8 km	MPC · JPL
137679	1999 XC_{45}	—	December 7, 1999	Socorro	LINEAR	NYS	1.8 km	MPC · JPL
137680	1999 XW_{45}	—	December 7, 1999	Socorro	LINEAR	NYS	1.8 km	MPC · JPL
137681	1999 XT_{46}	—	December 7, 1999	Socorro	LINEAR	V	920 m	MPC · JPL
137682	1999 XD_{48}	—	December 7, 1999	Socorro	LINEAR	·	3.5 km	MPC · JPL
137683	1999 XS_{50}	—	December 7, 1999	Socorro	LINEAR	MAS	1.0 km	MPC · JPL
137684	1999 XH_{51}	—	December 7, 1999	Socorro	LINEAR	MAS	850 m	MPC · JPL
137685	1999 XT_{51}	—	December 7, 1999	Socorro	LINEAR	NYS	1.6 km	MPC · JPL
137686	1999 XA_{52}	—	December 7, 1999	Socorro	LINEAR	·	1.8 km	MPC · JPL
137687	1999 XV_{55}	—	December 7, 1999	Socorro	LINEAR	·	3.5 km	MPC · JPL
137688	1999 XF_{59}	—	December 7, 1999	Socorro	LINEAR	·	2.2 km	MPC · JPL
137689	1999 XB_{60}	—	December 7, 1999	Socorro	LINEAR	·	1.3 km	MPC · JPL
137690	1999 XW_{61}	—	December 7, 1999	Socorro	LINEAR	·	1.2 km	MPC · JPL
137691	1999 XC_{62}	—	December 7, 1999	Socorro	LINEAR	·	1.9 km	MPC · JPL
137692	1999 XU_{62}	—	December 7, 1999	Socorro	LINEAR	·	2.3 km	MPC · JPL
137693	1999 XG_{63}	—	December 7, 1999	Socorro	LINEAR	MAS	890 m	MPC · JPL
137694	1999 XW_{64}	—	December 7, 1999	Socorro	LINEAR	·	1.3 km	MPC · JPL
137695	1999 XT_{68}	—	December 7, 1999	Socorro	LINEAR	·	1.2 km	MPC · JPL
137696	1999 XA_{69}	—	December 7, 1999	Socorro	LINEAR	NYS	1.8 km	MPC · JPL
137697	1999 XM_{69}	—	December 7, 1999	Socorro	LINEAR	·	1.6 km	MPC · JPL
137698	1999 XR_{69}	—	December 7, 1999	Socorro	LINEAR	·	1.9 km	MPC · JPL
137699	1999 XE_{72}	—	December 7, 1999	Socorro	LINEAR	·	2.7 km	MPC · JPL
137700	1999 XV_{72}	—	December 7, 1999	Socorro	LINEAR	·	1.7 km	MPC · JPL

== 137701–137800 ==
back to top

Designation			Discovery			Properties		Ref
Permanent	Provisional	Named after	Date	Site	Discoverer(s)	Category	Diam.	Ref
137701	1999 XR_{73}	—	December 7, 1999	Socorro	LINEAR	·	1.5 km	MPC · JPL
137702	1999 XZ_{75}	—	December 7, 1999	Socorro	LINEAR	·	1.8 km	MPC · JPL
137703	1999 XE_{78}	—	December 7, 1999	Socorro	LINEAR	NYS	2.3 km	MPC · JPL
137704	1999 XV_{78}	—	December 7, 1999	Socorro	LINEAR	·	3.5 km	MPC · JPL
137705	1999 XL_{81}	—	December 7, 1999	Socorro	LINEAR	·	2.1 km	MPC · JPL
137706	1999 XB_{83}	—	December 7, 1999	Socorro	LINEAR	NYS	1.7 km	MPC · JPL
137707	1999 XJ_{83}	—	December 7, 1999	Socorro	LINEAR	NYS	2.6 km	MPC · JPL
137708	1999 XK_{89}	—	December 7, 1999	Socorro	LINEAR	·	1.5 km	MPC · JPL
137709	1999 XX_{89}	—	December 7, 1999	Socorro	LINEAR	·	1.7 km	MPC · JPL
137710	1999 XH_{93}	—	December 7, 1999	Socorro	LINEAR	·	2.8 km	MPC · JPL
137711	1999 XJ_{96}	—	December 7, 1999	Socorro	LINEAR	·	2.2 km	MPC · JPL
137712	1999 XU_{96}	—	December 7, 1999	Socorro	LINEAR	·	1.2 km	MPC · JPL
137713	1999 XX_{96}	—	December 7, 1999	Socorro	LINEAR	·	2.4 km	MPC · JPL
137714	1999 XY_{96}	—	December 7, 1999	Socorro	LINEAR	·	2.0 km	MPC · JPL
137715	1999 XA_{98}	—	December 7, 1999	Socorro	LINEAR	·	2.6 km	MPC · JPL
137716	1999 XG_{98}	—	December 7, 1999	Socorro	LINEAR	NYS	2.2 km	MPC · JPL
137717	1999 XT_{101}	—	December 7, 1999	Socorro	LINEAR	·	2.3 km	MPC · JPL
137718	1999 XA_{102}	—	December 7, 1999	Socorro	LINEAR	·	2.1 km	MPC · JPL
137719	1999 XS_{102}	—	December 7, 1999	Socorro	LINEAR	NYS	1.8 km	MPC · JPL
137720	1999 XU_{102}	—	December 7, 1999	Socorro	LINEAR	NYS	2.4 km	MPC · JPL
137721	1999 XW_{103}	—	December 7, 1999	Socorro	LINEAR	·	2.0 km	MPC · JPL
137722	1999 XN_{104}	—	December 7, 1999	Socorro	LINEAR	·	1.7 km	MPC · JPL
137723	1999 XR_{107}	—	December 4, 1999	Catalina	CSS	·	2.5 km	MPC · JPL
137724	1999 XW_{111}	—	December 7, 1999	Socorro	LINEAR	·	1.5 km	MPC · JPL
137725	1999 XY_{111}	—	December 7, 1999	Socorro	LINEAR	MAS	1.1 km	MPC · JPL
137726	1999 XL_{115}	—	December 4, 1999	Catalina	CSS	·	1.3 km	MPC · JPL
137727	1999 XG_{117}	—	December 5, 1999	Catalina	CSS	(883)	1.8 km	MPC · JPL
137728	1999 XP_{117}	—	December 5, 1999	Catalina	CSS	·	1.8 km	MPC · JPL
137729	1999 XW_{118}	—	December 5, 1999	Catalina	CSS	NYS	1.4 km	MPC · JPL
137730	1999 XR_{121}	—	December 5, 1999	Catalina	CSS	·	1.5 km	MPC · JPL
137731	1999 XW_{121}	—	December 7, 1999	Catalina	CSS	·	1.7 km	MPC · JPL
137732	1999 XY_{121}	—	December 7, 1999	Catalina	CSS	(2076)	1.4 km	MPC · JPL
137733	1999 XG_{122}	—	December 7, 1999	Catalina	CSS	PHO	2.8 km	MPC · JPL
137734	1999 XC_{123}	—	December 7, 1999	Catalina	CSS	·	2.2 km	MPC · JPL
137735	1999 XF_{124}	—	December 7, 1999	Catalina	CSS	·	3.7 km	MPC · JPL
137736	1999 XX_{125}	—	December 7, 1999	Catalina	CSS	·	2.3 km	MPC · JPL
137737	1999 XD_{128}	—	December 7, 1999	Socorro	LINEAR	NYS	1.3 km	MPC · JPL
137738	1999 XK_{130}	—	December 12, 1999	Socorro	LINEAR	·	4.9 km	MPC · JPL
137739	1999 XO_{130}	—	December 12, 1999	Socorro	LINEAR	·	2.6 km	MPC · JPL
137740	1999 XN_{131}	—	December 12, 1999	Socorro	LINEAR	V	930 m	MPC · JPL
137741	1999 XA_{135}	—	December 6, 1999	Socorro	LINEAR	PHO	2.3 km	MPC · JPL
137742	1999 XH_{136}	—	December 13, 1999	Socorro	LINEAR	PHO	2.1 km	MPC · JPL
137743	1999 XE_{138}	—	December 2, 1999	Kitt Peak	Spacewatch	V	850 m	MPC · JPL
137744	1999 XU_{138}	—	December 5, 1999	Kitt Peak	Spacewatch	V	1.1 km	MPC · JPL
137745	1999 XY_{141}	—	December 12, 1999	Socorro	LINEAR	·	3.7 km	MPC · JPL
137746	1999 XP_{153}	—	December 7, 1999	Socorro	LINEAR	·	1.7 km	MPC · JPL
137747	1999 XC_{154}	—	December 8, 1999	Socorro	LINEAR	ERI	4.1 km	MPC · JPL
137748	1999 XQ_{154}	—	December 8, 1999	Socorro	LINEAR	NYS	1.7 km	MPC · JPL
137749	1999 XR_{154}	—	December 8, 1999	Socorro	LINEAR	·	1.5 km	MPC · JPL
137750	1999 XB_{157}	—	December 8, 1999	Socorro	LINEAR	·	1.8 km	MPC · JPL
137751	1999 XB_{159}	—	December 8, 1999	Socorro	LINEAR	·	2.1 km	MPC · JPL
137752	1999 XU_{160}	—	December 8, 1999	Socorro	LINEAR	·	1.9 km	MPC · JPL
137753	1999 XP_{161}	—	December 13, 1999	Socorro	LINEAR	·	2.2 km	MPC · JPL
137754	1999 XY_{162}	—	December 8, 1999	Kitt Peak	Spacewatch	·	2.1 km	MPC · JPL
137755	1999 XB_{164}	—	December 8, 1999	Socorro	LINEAR	NYS	1.8 km	MPC · JPL
137756	1999 XZ_{166}	—	December 10, 1999	Socorro	LINEAR	·	2.2 km	MPC · JPL
137757	1999 XK_{171}	—	December 10, 1999	Socorro	LINEAR	·	2.1 km	MPC · JPL
137758	1999 XH_{173}	—	December 10, 1999	Socorro	LINEAR	·	2.5 km	MPC · JPL
137759	1999 XM_{173}	—	December 10, 1999	Socorro	LINEAR	·	1.6 km	MPC · JPL
137760	1999 XF_{176}	—	December 10, 1999	Socorro	LINEAR	·	1.8 km	MPC · JPL
137761	1999 XG_{177}	—	December 10, 1999	Socorro	LINEAR	·	3.2 km	MPC · JPL
137762	1999 XM_{179}	—	December 10, 1999	Socorro	LINEAR	·	2.8 km	MPC · JPL
137763	1999 XW_{179}	—	December 10, 1999	Socorro	LINEAR	·	2.2 km	MPC · JPL
137764	1999 XX_{179}	—	December 10, 1999	Socorro	LINEAR	V	1.3 km	MPC · JPL
137765	1999 XT_{182}	—	December 12, 1999	Socorro	LINEAR	·	1.9 km	MPC · JPL
137766	1999 XM_{184}	—	December 12, 1999	Socorro	LINEAR	·	4.2 km	MPC · JPL
137767	1999 XG_{186}	—	December 12, 1999	Socorro	LINEAR	(2076)	1.6 km	MPC · JPL
137768	1999 XU_{187}	—	December 12, 1999	Socorro	LINEAR	·	2.2 km	MPC · JPL
137769	1999 XU_{189}	—	December 12, 1999	Socorro	LINEAR	·	3.6 km	MPC · JPL
137770	1999 XD_{195}	—	December 12, 1999	Socorro	LINEAR	V	1.5 km	MPC · JPL
137771	1999 XS_{196}	—	December 12, 1999	Socorro	LINEAR	·	2.6 km	MPC · JPL
137772	1999 XZ_{197}	—	December 12, 1999	Socorro	LINEAR	V	1.6 km	MPC · JPL
137773	1999 XM_{216}	—	December 13, 1999	Kitt Peak	Spacewatch	·	1.7 km	MPC · JPL
137774	1999 XP_{217}	—	December 13, 1999	Kitt Peak	Spacewatch	MAS	960 m	MPC · JPL
137775	1999 XH_{218}	—	December 13, 1999	Kitt Peak	Spacewatch	·	1.7 km	MPC · JPL
137776	1999 XJ_{218}	—	December 13, 1999	Kitt Peak	Spacewatch	MAS	1.2 km	MPC · JPL
137777	1999 XN_{218}	—	December 13, 1999	Kitt Peak	Spacewatch	·	2.4 km	MPC · JPL
137778	1999 XL_{220}	—	December 12, 1999	Socorro	LINEAR	·	2.2 km	MPC · JPL
137779	1999 XL_{221}	—	December 15, 1999	Socorro	LINEAR	·	1.7 km	MPC · JPL
137780	1999 XO_{223}	—	December 13, 1999	Kitt Peak	Spacewatch	·	2.0 km	MPC · JPL
137781	1999 XX_{224}	—	December 13, 1999	Kitt Peak	Spacewatch	·	3.0 km	MPC · JPL
137782	1999 XF_{226}	—	December 14, 1999	Kitt Peak	Spacewatch	·	2.6 km	MPC · JPL
137783	1999 XQ_{226}	—	December 14, 1999	Kitt Peak	Spacewatch	NYS	1.6 km	MPC · JPL
137784	1999 XV_{228}	—	December 14, 1999	Kitt Peak	Spacewatch	·	1.6 km	MPC · JPL
137785	1999 XB_{234}	—	December 4, 1999	Anderson Mesa	LONEOS	·	1.3 km	MPC · JPL
137786	1999 XE_{237}	—	December 5, 1999	Kitt Peak	Spacewatch	·	1.4 km	MPC · JPL
137787	1999 XV_{237}	—	December 5, 1999	Catalina	CSS	·	3.0 km	MPC · JPL
137788	1999 XP_{238}	—	December 4, 1999	Kitt Peak	Spacewatch	·	2.5 km	MPC · JPL
137789	1999 XF_{239}	—	December 5, 1999	Catalina	CSS	(2076)	1.6 km	MPC · JPL
137790	1999 XJ_{239}	—	December 7, 1999	Catalina	CSS	·	1.6 km	MPC · JPL
137791	1999 XR_{242}	—	December 13, 1999	Socorro	LINEAR	EUN	2.5 km	MPC · JPL
137792	1999 XP_{245}	—	December 5, 1999	Socorro	LINEAR	·	1.2 km	MPC · JPL
137793	1999 XU_{250}	—	December 5, 1999	Kitt Peak	Spacewatch	NYS	1.8 km	MPC · JPL
137794	1999 XK_{252}	—	December 9, 1999	Kitt Peak	Spacewatch	·	2.0 km	MPC · JPL
137795	1999 XM_{252}	—	December 12, 1999	Kitt Peak	Spacewatch	·	2.0 km	MPC · JPL
137796	1999 XB_{254}	—	December 12, 1999	Kitt Peak	Spacewatch	MAS	1.0 km	MPC · JPL
137797	1999 XS_{255}	—	December 4, 1999	Kitt Peak	Spacewatch	·	2.2 km	MPC · JPL
137798	1999 XH_{256}	—	December 7, 1999	Socorro	LINEAR	·	2.0 km	MPC · JPL
137799	1999 YB	—	December 16, 1999	Anderson Mesa	LONEOS	AMO	620 m	MPC · JPL
137800	1999 YE	—	December 16, 1999	Socorro	LINEAR	PHO	2.4 km	MPC · JPL

== 137801–137900 ==
back to top

Designation			Discovery			Properties		Ref
Permanent	Provisional	Named after	Date	Site	Discoverer(s)	Category	Diam.	Ref
137801	1999 YR	—	December 16, 1999	Socorro	LINEAR	PHO	2.3 km	MPC · JPL
137802	1999 YT	—	December 16, 1999	Socorro	LINEAR	AMO +1km	1.4 km	MPC · JPL
137803	1999 YR_{1}	—	December 16, 1999	Socorro	LINEAR	·	1.8 km	MPC · JPL
137804	1999 YQ_{2}	—	December 16, 1999	Kitt Peak	Spacewatch	·	1.6 km	MPC · JPL
137805	1999 YK_{5}	—	December 28, 1999	Socorro	LINEAR	ATE +1km	2.2 km	MPC · JPL
137806	1999 YW_{6}	—	December 30, 1999	Socorro	LINEAR	PHO	2.0 km	MPC · JPL
137807	1999 YE_{7}	—	December 30, 1999	Socorro	LINEAR	PHO	1.9 km	MPC · JPL
137808	1999 YU_{7}	—	December 27, 1999	Kitt Peak	Spacewatch	·	1.2 km	MPC · JPL
137809	1999 YL_{8}	—	December 27, 1999	Kitt Peak	Spacewatch	·	1.3 km	MPC · JPL
137810	1999 YS_{8}	—	December 27, 1999	Kitt Peak	Spacewatch	·	1.7 km	MPC · JPL
137811	1999 YD_{14}	—	December 31, 1999	Kitt Peak	Spacewatch	·	2.1 km	MPC · JPL
137812	1999 YU_{14}	—	December 31, 1999	Farpoint	G. Hug, G. Bell	·	1.9 km	MPC · JPL
137813	1999 YB_{16}	—	December 31, 1999	Kitt Peak	Spacewatch	NYS	1.8 km	MPC · JPL
137814	1999 YJ_{17}	—	December 31, 1999	Kitt Peak	Spacewatch	V	1.2 km	MPC · JPL
137815	1999 YS_{23}	—	December 16, 1999	Kitt Peak	Spacewatch	NYS	1.3 km	MPC · JPL
137816	1999 YD_{25}	—	December 27, 1999	Kitt Peak	Spacewatch	3:2	9.7 km	MPC · JPL
137817	2000 AE_{1}	—	January 2, 2000	Kitt Peak	Spacewatch	MAS	1.1 km	MPC · JPL
137818	2000 AR_{3}	—	January 2, 2000	Socorro	LINEAR	PHO	2.9 km	MPC · JPL
137819	2000 AD_{4}	—	January 3, 2000	Socorro	LINEAR	·	1.8 km	MPC · JPL
137820	2000 AL_{6}	—	January 4, 2000	Prescott	P. G. Comba	·	1.9 km	MPC · JPL
137821	2000 AO_{7}	—	January 2, 2000	Socorro	LINEAR	·	1.9 km	MPC · JPL
137822	2000 AB_{13}	—	January 3, 2000	Socorro	LINEAR	·	1.6 km	MPC · JPL
137823	2000 AN_{14}	—	January 3, 2000	Socorro	LINEAR	NYS	1.6 km	MPC · JPL
137824	2000 AT_{16}	—	January 3, 2000	Socorro	LINEAR	·	1.9 km	MPC · JPL
137825	2000 AX_{17}	—	January 3, 2000	Socorro	LINEAR	·	1.7 km	MPC · JPL
137826	2000 AX_{21}	—	January 3, 2000	Socorro	LINEAR	·	4.3 km	MPC · JPL
137827	2000 AY_{21}	—	January 3, 2000	Socorro	LINEAR	NYS	2.7 km	MPC · JPL
137828	2000 AC_{22}	—	January 3, 2000	Socorro	LINEAR	V	1.1 km	MPC · JPL
137829	2000 AC_{24}	—	January 3, 2000	Socorro	LINEAR	·	1.5 km	MPC · JPL
137830	2000 AP_{24}	—	January 3, 2000	Socorro	LINEAR	MAS	1.8 km	MPC · JPL
137831	2000 AM_{25}	—	January 3, 2000	Socorro	LINEAR	NYS	2.1 km	MPC · JPL
137832	2000 AW_{25}	—	January 3, 2000	Socorro	LINEAR	NYS	2.4 km	MPC · JPL
137833	2000 AZ_{25}	—	January 3, 2000	Socorro	LINEAR	·	1.8 km	MPC · JPL
137834	2000 AM_{26}	—	January 3, 2000	Socorro	LINEAR	·	1.7 km	MPC · JPL
137835	2000 AX_{27}	—	January 3, 2000	Socorro	LINEAR	·	2.3 km	MPC · JPL
137836	2000 AZ_{27}	—	January 3, 2000	Socorro	LINEAR	·	2.0 km	MPC · JPL
137837	2000 AX_{28}	—	January 3, 2000	Socorro	LINEAR	·	2.8 km	MPC · JPL
137838	2000 AD_{29}	—	January 3, 2000	Socorro	LINEAR	·	2.2 km	MPC · JPL
137839	2000 AM_{32}	—	January 3, 2000	Socorro	LINEAR	NYS	2.3 km	MPC · JPL
137840	2000 AX_{32}	—	January 3, 2000	Socorro	LINEAR	·	2.4 km	MPC · JPL
137841	2000 AN_{35}	—	January 3, 2000	Socorro	LINEAR	·	2.0 km	MPC · JPL
137842	2000 AK_{37}	—	January 3, 2000	Socorro	LINEAR	·	1.8 km	MPC · JPL
137843	2000 AM_{37}	—	January 3, 2000	Socorro	LINEAR	·	3.1 km	MPC · JPL
137844	2000 AS_{37}	—	January 3, 2000	Socorro	LINEAR	·	1.9 km	MPC · JPL
137845	2000 AT_{37}	—	January 3, 2000	Socorro	LINEAR	NYS	1.6 km	MPC · JPL
137846	2000 AT_{41}	—	January 3, 2000	Socorro	LINEAR	·	3.0 km	MPC · JPL
137847	2000 AT_{43}	—	January 2, 2000	Kitt Peak	Spacewatch	·	1.9 km	MPC · JPL
137848	2000 AT_{45}	—	January 3, 2000	Socorro	LINEAR	·	1.9 km	MPC · JPL
137849	2000 AY_{50}	—	January 6, 2000	Prescott	P. G. Comba	·	1.6 km	MPC · JPL
137850	2000 AL_{52}	—	January 4, 2000	Socorro	LINEAR	·	2.0 km	MPC · JPL
137851	2000 AR_{52}	—	January 4, 2000	Socorro	LINEAR	·	1.3 km	MPC · JPL
137852	2000 AW_{52}	—	January 4, 2000	Socorro	LINEAR	·	1.6 km	MPC · JPL
137853	2000 AB_{53}	—	January 4, 2000	Socorro	LINEAR	·	1.9 km	MPC · JPL
137854	2000 AG_{54}	—	January 4, 2000	Socorro	LINEAR	·	2.7 km	MPC · JPL
137855	2000 AQ_{56}	—	January 4, 2000	Socorro	LINEAR	·	3.3 km	MPC · JPL
137856	2000 AP_{57}	—	January 4, 2000	Socorro	LINEAR	·	1.8 km	MPC · JPL
137857	2000 AT_{59}	—	January 4, 2000	Socorro	LINEAR	NYS	2.8 km	MPC · JPL
137858	2000 AX_{59}	—	January 4, 2000	Socorro	LINEAR	·	1.7 km	MPC · JPL
137859	2000 AX_{61}	—	January 4, 2000	Socorro	LINEAR	·	2.9 km	MPC · JPL
137860	2000 AK_{65}	—	January 4, 2000	Socorro	LINEAR	·	2.4 km	MPC · JPL
137861	2000 AA_{66}	—	January 4, 2000	Socorro	LINEAR	·	2.6 km	MPC · JPL
137862	2000 AP_{66}	—	January 4, 2000	Socorro	LINEAR	·	1.4 km	MPC · JPL
137863	2000 AQ_{66}	—	January 4, 2000	Socorro	LINEAR	ERI	3.7 km	MPC · JPL
137864	2000 AU_{78}	—	January 5, 2000	Socorro	LINEAR	·	2.6 km	MPC · JPL
137865	2000 AJ_{82}	—	January 5, 2000	Socorro	LINEAR	·	1.6 km	MPC · JPL
137866	2000 AP_{82}	—	January 5, 2000	Socorro	LINEAR	MAS	1.3 km	MPC · JPL
137867	2000 AO_{83}	—	January 5, 2000	Socorro	LINEAR	MAS	1.2 km	MPC · JPL
137868	2000 AA_{84}	—	January 5, 2000	Socorro	LINEAR	·	2.5 km	MPC · JPL
137869	2000 AA_{86}	—	January 5, 2000	Socorro	LINEAR	NYS	1.9 km	MPC · JPL
137870	2000 AE_{86}	—	January 5, 2000	Socorro	LINEAR	NYS	2.0 km	MPC · JPL
137871	2000 AO_{86}	—	January 5, 2000	Socorro	LINEAR	MAS	1.3 km	MPC · JPL
137872	2000 AH_{87}	—	January 5, 2000	Socorro	LINEAR	·	2.8 km	MPC · JPL
137873	2000 AC_{91}	—	January 5, 2000	Socorro	LINEAR	·	2.0 km	MPC · JPL
137874	2000 AV_{93}	—	January 7, 2000	Oaxaca	Roe, J. M.	·	2.0 km	MPC · JPL
137875	2000 AE_{98}	—	January 4, 2000	Socorro	LINEAR	·	2.7 km	MPC · JPL
137876	2000 AR_{104}	—	January 5, 2000	Socorro	LINEAR	·	2.2 km	MPC · JPL
137877	2000 AB_{105}	—	January 5, 2000	Socorro	LINEAR	·	2.3 km	MPC · JPL
137878	2000 AS_{106}	—	January 5, 2000	Socorro	LINEAR	·	1.9 km	MPC · JPL
137879	2000 AJ_{114}	—	January 5, 2000	Socorro	LINEAR	L4	23 km	MPC · JPL
137880	2000 AA_{115}	—	January 5, 2000	Socorro	LINEAR	·	2.5 km	MPC · JPL
137881	2000 AR_{119}	—	January 5, 2000	Socorro	LINEAR	·	3.0 km	MPC · JPL
137882	2000 AF_{120}	—	January 5, 2000	Socorro	LINEAR	V	1.5 km	MPC · JPL
137883	2000 AP_{127}	—	January 5, 2000	Socorro	LINEAR	·	1.8 km	MPC · JPL
137884	2000 AG_{128}	—	January 5, 2000	Socorro	LINEAR	·	2.8 km	MPC · JPL
137885	2000 AG_{129}	—	January 5, 2000	Socorro	LINEAR	·	1.4 km	MPC · JPL
137886	2000 AP_{133}	—	January 4, 2000	Socorro	LINEAR	PHO	1.5 km	MPC · JPL
137887	2000 AU_{133}	—	January 4, 2000	Socorro	LINEAR	·	1.8 km	MPC · JPL
137888	2000 AG_{135}	—	January 4, 2000	Socorro	LINEAR	·	2.2 km	MPC · JPL
137889	2000 AO_{136}	—	January 4, 2000	Socorro	LINEAR	·	2.9 km	MPC · JPL
137890	2000 AZ_{146}	—	January 4, 2000	Oizumi	T. Kobayashi	·	2.5 km	MPC · JPL
137891	2000 AJ_{149}	—	January 7, 2000	Socorro	LINEAR	PHO	3.7 km	MPC · JPL
137892	2000 AR_{154}	—	January 3, 2000	Socorro	LINEAR	·	2.2 km	MPC · JPL
137893	2000 AO_{157}	—	January 3, 2000	Socorro	LINEAR	·	2.0 km	MPC · JPL
137894	2000 AZ_{158}	—	January 3, 2000	Socorro	LINEAR	·	2.4 km	MPC · JPL
137895	2000 AS_{164}	—	January 6, 2000	Socorro	LINEAR	NYS	1.8 km	MPC · JPL
137896	2000 AS_{167}	—	January 8, 2000	Socorro	LINEAR	·	3.1 km	MPC · JPL
137897	2000 AM_{169}	—	January 7, 2000	Socorro	LINEAR	·	1.6 km	MPC · JPL
137898	2000 AK_{172}	—	January 7, 2000	Socorro	LINEAR	·	2.3 km	MPC · JPL
137899	2000 AR_{187}	—	January 8, 2000	Socorro	LINEAR	PHO	2.7 km	MPC · JPL
137900	2000 AQ_{192}	—	January 8, 2000	Socorro	LINEAR	·	4.7 km	MPC · JPL

== 137901–138000 ==
back to top

Designation			Discovery			Properties		Ref
Permanent	Provisional	Named after	Date	Site	Discoverer(s)	Category	Diam.	Ref
137901	2000 AD_{204}	—	January 12, 2000	Višnjan Observatory	K. Korlević	·	3.1 km	MPC · JPL
137902	2000 AQ_{213}	—	January 6, 2000	Kitt Peak	Spacewatch	(5)	2.0 km	MPC · JPL
137903	2000 AT_{214}	—	January 7, 2000	Kitt Peak	Spacewatch	·	2.2 km	MPC · JPL
137904	2000 AU_{217}	—	January 8, 2000	Kitt Peak	Spacewatch	·	1.5 km	MPC · JPL
137905	2000 AT_{225}	—	January 12, 2000	Kitt Peak	Spacewatch	·	1.9 km	MPC · JPL
137906	2000 AL_{227}	—	January 10, 2000	Kitt Peak	Spacewatch	V	1.3 km	MPC · JPL
137907	2000 AT_{231}	—	January 4, 2000	Socorro	LINEAR	NYS	1.7 km	MPC · JPL
137908	2000 AT_{232}	—	January 4, 2000	Socorro	LINEAR	·	1.7 km	MPC · JPL
137909	2000 AN_{235}	—	January 5, 2000	Socorro	LINEAR	·	2.5 km	MPC · JPL
137910	2000 AP_{238}	—	January 6, 2000	Socorro	LINEAR	·	2.0 km	MPC · JPL
137911	2000 AB_{246}	—	January 8, 2000	Mauna Kea	D. J. Tholen, Whiteley, R. J.	AMO +1km	1.0 km	MPC · JPL
137912	2000 AK_{251}	—	January 4, 2000	Socorro	LINEAR	·	1.2 km	MPC · JPL
137913	2000 BH_{3}	—	January 27, 2000	Oizumi	T. Kobayashi	·	3.8 km	MPC · JPL
137914	2000 BU_{7}	—	January 29, 2000	Socorro	LINEAR	·	2.3 km	MPC · JPL
137915	2000 BK_{8}	—	January 29, 2000	Socorro	LINEAR	·	2.2 km	MPC · JPL
137916	2000 BM_{10}	—	January 28, 2000	Kitt Peak	Spacewatch	·	1.3 km	MPC · JPL
137917	2000 BW_{12}	—	January 28, 2000	Kitt Peak	Spacewatch	·	1.8 km	MPC · JPL
137918	2000 BO_{13}	—	January 29, 2000	Kitt Peak	Spacewatch	·	1.4 km	MPC · JPL
137919	2000 BD_{14}	—	January 28, 2000	Uenohara	N. Kawasato	·	3.8 km	MPC · JPL
137920	2000 BW_{16}	—	January 30, 2000	Socorro	LINEAR	MAS	1.5 km	MPC · JPL
137921	2000 BV_{17}	—	January 30, 2000	Socorro	LINEAR	·	2.4 km	MPC · JPL
137922	2000 BA_{18}	—	January 30, 2000	Socorro	LINEAR	·	1.7 km	MPC · JPL
137923	2000 BF_{18}	—	January 30, 2000	Socorro	LINEAR	·	2.2 km	MPC · JPL
137924	2000 BD_{19}	—	January 26, 2000	Socorro	LINEAR	ATE +1km	970 m	MPC · JPL
137925	2000 BJ_{19}	—	January 30, 2000	Catalina	CSS	APO +1km	1.4 km	MPC · JPL
137926	2000 BS_{22}	—	January 27, 2000	Višnjan Observatory	K. Korlević	(5)	2.0 km	MPC · JPL
137927	2000 BX_{23}	—	January 29, 2000	Socorro	LINEAR	·	2.4 km	MPC · JPL
137928	2000 BO_{24}	—	January 29, 2000	Socorro	LINEAR	PHO	1.8 km	MPC · JPL
137929	2000 BG_{26}	—	January 30, 2000	Socorro	LINEAR	·	2.2 km	MPC · JPL
137930	2000 BN_{26}	—	January 30, 2000	Socorro	LINEAR	NYS	2.4 km	MPC · JPL
137931	2000 BY_{26}	—	January 30, 2000	Socorro	LINEAR	NYS	2.4 km	MPC · JPL
137932	2000 BS_{28}	—	January 30, 2000	Socorro	LINEAR	NYS	1.8 km	MPC · JPL
137933	2000 BH_{32}	—	January 28, 2000	Kitt Peak	Spacewatch	·	1.7 km	MPC · JPL
137934	2000 BO_{32}	—	January 28, 2000	Kitt Peak	Spacewatch	·	2.8 km	MPC · JPL
137935	2000 BT_{32}	—	January 28, 2000	Kitt Peak	Spacewatch	MAS	1.3 km	MPC · JPL
137936	2000 BB_{34}	—	January 30, 2000	Kitt Peak	Spacewatch	·	2.1 km	MPC · JPL
137937	2000 BP_{34}	—	January 30, 2000	Catalina	CSS	·	2.4 km	MPC · JPL
137938	2000 BK_{35}	—	January 30, 2000	Socorro	LINEAR	·	3.3 km	MPC · JPL
137939	2000 BW_{35}	—	January 31, 2000	Socorro	LINEAR	·	2.1 km	MPC · JPL
137940	2000 BQ_{37}	—	January 26, 2000	Kitt Peak	Spacewatch	·	1.9 km	MPC · JPL
137941	2000 BQ_{42}	—	January 27, 2000	Kitt Peak	Spacewatch	MAS	1.3 km	MPC · JPL
137942	2000 BB_{47}	—	January 30, 2000	Socorro	LINEAR	·	2.9 km	MPC · JPL
137943	2000 BZ_{48}	—	January 26, 2000	Kitt Peak	Spacewatch	·	1.6 km	MPC · JPL
137944	2000 BC_{49}	—	January 27, 2000	Kitt Peak	Spacewatch	NYS	1.6 km	MPC · JPL
137945	2000 BF_{49}	—	January 27, 2000	Kitt Peak	Spacewatch	MAS	1.1 km	MPC · JPL
137946	2000 BF_{51}	—	January 30, 2000	Socorro	LINEAR	·	1.9 km	MPC · JPL
137947	2000 CD_{1}	—	February 4, 2000	Višnjan Observatory	K. Korlević	NYS	1.9 km	MPC · JPL
137948	2000 CY_{3}	—	February 2, 2000	Socorro	LINEAR	·	1.4 km	MPC · JPL
137949	2000 CV_{6}	—	February 2, 2000	Socorro	LINEAR	·	2.2 km	MPC · JPL
137950	2000 CB_{7}	—	February 2, 2000	Socorro	LINEAR	·	1.8 km	MPC · JPL
137951	2000 CG_{11}	—	February 2, 2000	Socorro	LINEAR	·	4.5 km	MPC · JPL
137952	2000 CY_{11}	—	February 2, 2000	Socorro	LINEAR	NYS	1.8 km	MPC · JPL
137953	2000 CG_{12}	—	February 2, 2000	Socorro	LINEAR	·	1.9 km	MPC · JPL
137954	2000 CK_{13}	—	February 2, 2000	Socorro	LINEAR	L4	11 km	MPC · JPL
137955	2000 CD_{15}	—	February 2, 2000	Socorro	LINEAR	·	1.7 km	MPC · JPL
137956	2000 CW_{17}	—	February 2, 2000	Socorro	LINEAR	·	2.3 km	MPC · JPL
137957	2000 CZ_{17}	—	February 2, 2000	Socorro	LINEAR	·	1.8 km	MPC · JPL
137958	2000 CX_{18}	—	February 2, 2000	Socorro	LINEAR	·	3.3 km	MPC · JPL
137959	2000 CZ_{18}	—	February 2, 2000	Socorro	LINEAR	·	2.6 km	MPC · JPL
137960	2000 CD_{19}	—	February 2, 2000	Socorro	LINEAR	MAS	1.1 km	MPC · JPL
137961	2000 CO_{19}	—	February 2, 2000	Socorro	LINEAR	·	2.6 km	MPC · JPL
137962	2000 CA_{22}	—	February 2, 2000	Socorro	LINEAR	·	2.1 km	MPC · JPL
137963	2000 CB_{23}	—	February 2, 2000	Socorro	LINEAR	·	3.0 km	MPC · JPL
137964	2000 CZ_{23}	—	February 2, 2000	Socorro	LINEAR	·	2.8 km	MPC · JPL
137965	2000 CT_{24}	—	February 2, 2000	Socorro	LINEAR	NYS	2.1 km	MPC · JPL
137966	2000 CZ_{24}	—	February 2, 2000	Socorro	LINEAR	ERI	5.1 km	MPC · JPL
137967	2000 CS_{26}	—	February 2, 2000	Socorro	LINEAR	·	2.8 km	MPC · JPL
137968	2000 CY_{31}	—	February 2, 2000	Socorro	LINEAR	·	1.6 km	MPC · JPL
137969	2000 CA_{32}	—	February 2, 2000	Socorro	LINEAR	·	1.8 km	MPC · JPL
137970	2000 CR_{33}	—	February 4, 2000	Višnjan Observatory	K. Korlević	EUN	2.0 km	MPC · JPL
137971	2000 CQ_{39}	—	February 5, 2000	Višnjan Observatory	K. Korlević	·	2.3 km	MPC · JPL
137972	2000 CB_{40}	—	February 2, 2000	Socorro	LINEAR	H	930 m	MPC · JPL
137973	2000 CH_{40}	—	February 4, 2000	Socorro	LINEAR	H	980 m	MPC · JPL
137974	2000 CG_{41}	—	February 7, 2000	Ondřejov	P. Kušnirák	·	2.4 km	MPC · JPL
137975	2000 CQ_{41}	—	February 2, 2000	Socorro	LINEAR	·	1.4 km	MPC · JPL
137976	2000 CT_{41}	—	February 2, 2000	Socorro	LINEAR	V	1.3 km	MPC · JPL
137977	2000 CU_{41}	—	February 2, 2000	Socorro	LINEAR	·	3.7 km	MPC · JPL
137978	2000 CL_{43}	—	February 2, 2000	Socorro	LINEAR	NYS	1.7 km	MPC · JPL
137979	2000 CG_{47}	—	February 2, 2000	Socorro	LINEAR	·	2.6 km	MPC · JPL
137980	2000 CC_{49}	—	February 2, 2000	Socorro	LINEAR	·	1.9 km	MPC · JPL
137981	2000 CH_{50}	—	February 2, 2000	Socorro	LINEAR	·	2.0 km	MPC · JPL
137982	2000 CR_{53}	—	February 2, 2000	Socorro	LINEAR	(5)	2.5 km	MPC · JPL
137983	2000 CU_{54}	—	February 2, 2000	Socorro	LINEAR	(194)	3.2 km	MPC · JPL
137984	2000 CV_{55}	—	February 4, 2000	Socorro	LINEAR	·	4.7 km	MPC · JPL
137985	2000 CP_{56}	—	February 4, 2000	Socorro	LINEAR	ADE	6.0 km	MPC · JPL
137986	2000 CG_{60}	—	February 2, 2000	Socorro	LINEAR	ERI	3.6 km	MPC · JPL
137987	2000 CN_{61}	—	February 2, 2000	Socorro	LINEAR	RAF	1.8 km	MPC · JPL
137988	2000 CA_{62}	—	February 2, 2000	Socorro	LINEAR	·	3.0 km	MPC · JPL
137989	2000 CB_{62}	—	February 2, 2000	Socorro	LINEAR	PHO	3.0 km	MPC · JPL
137990	2000 CD_{62}	—	February 2, 2000	Socorro	LINEAR	·	3.4 km	MPC · JPL
137991	2000 CM_{64}	—	February 3, 2000	Socorro	LINEAR	·	2.1 km	MPC · JPL
137992	2000 CE_{66}	—	February 6, 2000	Socorro	LINEAR	·	1.4 km	MPC · JPL
137993	2000 CH_{66}	—	February 6, 2000	Socorro	LINEAR	·	2.0 km	MPC · JPL
137994	2000 CQ_{66}	—	February 6, 2000	Socorro	LINEAR	MAS	1.3 km	MPC · JPL
137995	2000 CV_{74}	—	February 8, 2000	Kitt Peak	Spacewatch	·	2.2 km	MPC · JPL
137996	2000 CT_{77}	—	February 7, 2000	Kitt Peak	Spacewatch	NYS ·	1.9 km	MPC · JPL
137997	2000 CX_{77}	—	February 7, 2000	Kitt Peak	Spacewatch	NYS	1.7 km	MPC · JPL
137998	2000 CK_{80}	—	February 4, 2000	Socorro	LINEAR	(194)	3.5 km	MPC · JPL
137999	2000 CM_{80}	—	February 4, 2000	Socorro	LINEAR	·	2.3 km	MPC · JPL
138000	2000 CK_{82}	—	February 4, 2000	Socorro	LINEAR	NYS	3.0 km	MPC · JPL

back to top

== See also ==
- Meanings of minor-planet names: 137001–138000
