= Meanings of minor-planet names: 137001–138000 =

As minor planet discoveries are confirmed, they are given a permanent number by the IAU's Minor Planet Center (MPC), and the discoverers can then submit names for them, following the IAU's naming conventions. The list below concerns those minor planets in the specified number-range that have received names, and explains the meanings of those names.

Official naming citations of newly named small Solar System bodies are approved and published in a bulletin by IAU's Working Group for Small Bodies Nomenclature (WGSBN). Before May 2021, citations were published in MPC's Minor Planet Circulars for many decades. Recent citations can also be found on the JPL Small-Body Database (SBDB). Until his death in 2016, German astronomer Lutz D. Schmadel compiled these citations into the Dictionary of Minor Planet Names (DMP) and regularly updated the collection.

Based on Paul Herget's The Names of the Minor Planets, Schmadel also researched the unclear origin of numerous asteroids, most of which had been named prior to World War II. This article incorporates text from this source, which is in the public domain: SBDB New namings may only be added to this list below after official publication as the preannouncement of names is condemned. The WGSBN publishes a comprehensive guideline for the naming rules of non-cometary small Solar System bodies.

== 137001–137100 ==
Named minor planet	Provisional	This minor planet was named for...	Ref · Catalog
137039 Lisiguang	1998 UX_{31}	Li Siguang (1899–1971), founder of and pioneer in modern Chinese geology	JPL · 137039
137052 Tjelvar	1998 VO_{33}	Tjelvar, first inhabitant on Gotland	JPL · 137052
137066 Gellért-hegy	1998 WR_{8}	Gellért-hegy, a 235-meter high hill on the shore of the Danube in Budapest, Hungary	JPL · 137066
137082 Maurobachini	1998 XE_{9}	Mauro Bachini (born 1959), an amateur astronomer who works at the Astronomical Observatory of Tavolaia, Santa Maria a Monte.	JPL · 137082

== 137101–137200 ==
back to top

Named minor planet	Provisional	This minor planet was named for...	Ref · Catalog
137165 Annis	1999 FP_{68}	Jim Annis (born 1961), American astronomer	JPL · 137165
137166 Netabahcall	1999 FS_{81}	Neta Bahcall (born 1942), Israeli-American cosmologist	JPL · 137166

== 137201–137300 ==
back to top

Named minor planet	Provisional	This minor planet was named for...	Ref · Catalog
137217 Racah	1999 NH_{64}	Giulio Racah (1909–1965), founder of physics in Israel	JPL · 137217

== 137301–137400 ==
back to top

Named minor planet	Provisional	This minor planet was named for...	Ref · Catalog
137315 Wangshouwu	1999 TB_{20}	Wang Shouwu, Chinese physicist.	IAU · 137315

== 137401–137500 ==
back to top

Named minor planet	Provisional	This minor planet was named for...	Ref · Catalog
There are no named minor planets in this number range

== 137501–137600 ==
back to top

Named minor planet	Provisional	This minor planet was named for...	Ref · Catalog
There are no named minor planets in this number range

== 137601–137700 ==
back to top

Named minor planet	Provisional	This minor planet was named for...	Ref · Catalog
137632 Ramsauer	1999 WG_{2}	Alfred Ramsauer (born 1928) has been a member of the Linzer Astronomische Gemeinschaft since 1952.	JPL · 137632

== 137701–137800 ==
back to top

Named minor planet	Provisional	This minor planet was named for...	Ref · Catalog
There are no named minor planets in this number range

== 137801–137900 ==
back to top

Named minor planet	Provisional	This minor planet was named for...	Ref · Catalog
There are no named minor planets in this number range

== 137901–138000 ==
back to top

Named minor planet	Provisional	This minor planet was named for...	Ref · Catalog
There are no named minor planets in this number range

back to top

Preceded by 136,001–137,000	Meanings of minor-planet names List of minor planets: 137,001–138,000	Succeeded by 138,001–139,000
