= Meanings of minor-planet names: 138001–139000 =

As minor planet discoveries are confirmed, they are given a permanent number by the IAU's Minor Planet Center (MPC), and the discoverers can then submit names for them, following the IAU's naming conventions. The list below concerns those minor planets in the specified number-range that have received names, and explains the meanings of those names.

Official naming citations of newly named small Solar System bodies are approved and published in a bulletin by IAU's Working Group for Small Bodies Nomenclature (WGSBN). Before May 2021, citations were published in MPC's Minor Planet Circulars for many decades. Recent citations can also be found on the JPL Small-Body Database (SBDB). Until his death in 2016, German astronomer Lutz D. Schmadel compiled these citations into the Dictionary of Minor Planet Names (DMP) and regularly updated the collection.

Based on Paul Herget's The Names of the Minor Planets, Schmadel also researched the unclear origin of numerous asteroids, most of which had been named prior to World War II. This article incorporates text from this source, which is in the public domain: SBDB New namings may only be added to this list below after official publication as the preannouncement of names is condemned. The WGSBN publishes a comprehensive guideline for the naming rules of non-cometary small Solar System bodies.

== 138001–138100 ==
Named minor planet	Provisional	This minor planet was named for...	Ref · Catalog
138016 Kerribeisser	2000 CQ_{111}	Kerri B. Beisser (born 1974) is a project manager at the Johns Hopkins University Applied Physics Laboratory, and served as the Education and Public Outreach Lead for the New Horizons Mission to Pluto.	JPL · 138016

== 138101–138200 ==
back to top

Named minor planet	Provisional	This minor planet was named for...	Ref · Catalog
138200 Anderswall	2000 EW_{137}	Anders Wall (b. 1931), a Swedish businessman and philanthropist.	IAU · 138200

== 138201–138300 ==
back to top

Named minor planet	Provisional	This minor planet was named for...	Ref · Catalog
138221 Baldry	2000 EC_{207}	Ivan Baldry (born 1971), British astronomer with the Sloan Digital Sky Survey who works on the color bimodality of galaxies	JPL · 138221

== 138301–138400 ==
back to top

Named minor planet	Provisional	This minor planet was named for...	Ref · Catalog
There are no named minor planets in this number range

== 138401–138500 ==
back to top

Named minor planet	Provisional	This minor planet was named for...	Ref · Catalog
138445 Westenburger	2000 JF_{2}	Carl-Heinz Westenburger (1924–2008), German painter, printmaker and conservationist	JPL · 138445

== 138501–138600 ==
back to top

Named minor planet	Provisional	This minor planet was named for...	Ref · Catalog
There are no named minor planets in this number range

== 138601–138700 ==
back to top

Named minor planet	Provisional	This minor planet was named for...	Ref · Catalog
138626 Tanguybertrand	2000 QM_{248}	Tanguy Bertrand (b. 1989), a French planetary astronomer.	IAU · 138626

== 138701–138800 ==
back to top

Named minor planet	Provisional	This minor planet was named for...	Ref · Catalog
There are no named minor planets in this number range

== 138801–138900 ==
back to top

Named minor planet	Provisional	This minor planet was named for...	Ref · Catalog
There are no named minor planets in this number range

== 138901–139000 ==
back to top

Named minor planet	Provisional	This minor planet was named for...	Ref · Catalog
138979 Černice	2001 CM_{32}	The small Czech village of Černice, located in the South Bohemian Region above the Vltava river	JPL · 138979

back to top

Preceded by 137,001–138,000	Meanings of minor-planet names List of minor planets: 138,001–139,000	Succeeded by 139,001–140,000
