= List of minor planets: 138001–139000 =

The following is a partial list of minor planets, running from minor-planet number 138001 through 139000, inclusive. The primary data for this and other partial lists is based on JPL's "Small-Body Orbital Elements" and data available from the Minor Planet Center. Critical list information is also provided by the MPC, unless otherwise specified from Lowell Observatory. A detailed description of the table's columns and additional sources are given on the main page including a complete list of every page in this series, and a statistical break-up on the dynamical classification of minor planets.

Also see the summary list of all named bodies in numerical and alphabetical order, and the corresponding naming citations for the number range of this particular list. New namings may only be added to this list after official publication, as the preannouncement of names is condemned by the Working Group for Small Bodies Nomenclature of the International Astronomical Union.

Near-Earth obj.	MBA (inner)	MBA (outer)	Centaur
Mars-crosser	MBA (middle)	Jupiter trojan	Trans-Neptunian obj.
Unclassified

== 138001–138100 ==
Designation			Discovery			Properties		Ref
Permanent	Provisional	Named after	Date	Site	Discoverer(s)	Category	Diam.	Ref
138001	2000 CV_{82}	—	February 4, 2000	Socorro	LINEAR	·	2.0 km	MPC · JPL
138002	2000 CN_{84}	—	February 4, 2000	Socorro	LINEAR	·	2.1 km	MPC · JPL
138003	2000 CK_{85}	—	February 4, 2000	Socorro	LINEAR	·	2.1 km	MPC · JPL
138004	2000 CW_{85}	—	February 4, 2000	Socorro	LINEAR	MAS	1.6 km	MPC · JPL
138005	2000 CT_{87}	—	February 4, 2000	Socorro	LINEAR	·	3.2 km	MPC · JPL
138006	2000 CV_{87}	—	February 4, 2000	Socorro	LINEAR	PHO	1.7 km	MPC · JPL
138007	2000 CN_{88}	—	February 4, 2000	Socorro	LINEAR	·	2.3 km	MPC · JPL
138008	2000 CT_{88}	—	February 4, 2000	Socorro	LINEAR	EUN	3.5 km	MPC · JPL
138009	2000 CX_{99}	—	February 10, 2000	Kitt Peak	Spacewatch	·	3.9 km	MPC · JPL
138010	2000 CG_{100}	—	February 10, 2000	Kitt Peak	Spacewatch	·	2.3 km	MPC · JPL
138011	2000 CO_{100}	—	February 10, 2000	Kitt Peak	Spacewatch	·	2.1 km	MPC · JPL
138012	2000 CC_{101}	—	February 12, 2000	Kitt Peak	Spacewatch	·	2.8 km	MPC · JPL
138013	2000 CN_{101}	—	February 8, 2000	Socorro	LINEAR	APO +1km	3.5 km	MPC · JPL
138014	2000 CN_{103}	—	February 8, 2000	Socorro	LINEAR	·	2.1 km	MPC · JPL
138015	2000 CT_{109}	—	February 5, 2000	Catalina	CSS	·	2.7 km	MPC · JPL
138016 Kerribeisser	2000 CQ_{111}	Kerribeisser	February 6, 2000	Kitt Peak	M. W. Buie	·	1.8 km	MPC · JPL
138017	2000 CG_{113}	—	February 8, 2000	Kitt Peak	Spacewatch	·	1.2 km	MPC · JPL
138018	2000 CL_{113}	—	February 10, 2000	Kitt Peak	Spacewatch	ERI	2.5 km	MPC · JPL
138019	2000 CG_{117}	—	February 3, 2000	Socorro	LINEAR	·	2.0 km	MPC · JPL
138020	2000 CL_{118}	—	February 11, 2000	Socorro	LINEAR	NYS	2.1 km	MPC · JPL
138021	2000 CG_{121}	—	February 2, 2000	Socorro	LINEAR	NYS	2.2 km	MPC · JPL
138022	2000 CH_{121}	—	February 2, 2000	Socorro	LINEAR	·	1.6 km	MPC · JPL
138023	2000 CL_{126}	—	February 4, 2000	Socorro	LINEAR	·	3.3 km	MPC · JPL
138024	2000 CW_{131}	—	February 3, 2000	Kitt Peak	Spacewatch	·	1.6 km	MPC · JPL
138025	2000 CB_{134}	—	February 4, 2000	Kitt Peak	Spacewatch	·	1.6 km	MPC · JPL
138026	2000 DR	—	February 24, 2000	Oizumi	T. Kobayashi	(5)	2.9 km	MPC · JPL
138027	2000 DD_{1}	—	February 23, 2000	Polino	Polino, Osservatorio	·	2.1 km	MPC · JPL
138028	2000 DY_{1}	—	February 26, 2000	Kitt Peak	Spacewatch	·	2.4 km	MPC · JPL
138029	2000 DP_{2}	—	February 27, 2000	Olathe	Olathe	·	1.9 km	MPC · JPL
138030	2000 DP_{4}	—	February 28, 2000	Socorro	LINEAR	·	2.3 km	MPC · JPL
138031	2000 DK_{9}	—	February 26, 2000	Kitt Peak	Spacewatch	L4	10 km	MPC · JPL
138032	2000 DC_{11}	—	February 26, 2000	Kitt Peak	Spacewatch	·	2.6 km	MPC · JPL
138033	2000 DQ_{11}	—	February 27, 2000	Kitt Peak	Spacewatch	·	2.1 km	MPC · JPL
138034	2000 DQ_{16}	—	February 29, 2000	Socorro	LINEAR	HNS	3.0 km	MPC · JPL
138035	2000 DE_{17}	—	February 29, 2000	Socorro	LINEAR	H	770 m	MPC · JPL
138036	2000 DM_{17}	—	February 29, 2000	Socorro	LINEAR	·	1.5 km	MPC · JPL
138037	2000 DG_{18}	—	February 28, 2000	Socorro	LINEAR	·	2.3 km	MPC · JPL
138038	2000 DV_{18}	—	February 29, 2000	Socorro	LINEAR	EUN	2.2 km	MPC · JPL
138039	2000 DN_{19}	—	February 29, 2000	Socorro	LINEAR	·	2.3 km	MPC · JPL
138040	2000 DJ_{21}	—	February 29, 2000	Socorro	LINEAR	·	1.7 km	MPC · JPL
138041	2000 DN_{21}	—	February 29, 2000	Socorro	LINEAR	V	1.6 km	MPC · JPL
138042	2000 DW_{21}	—	February 29, 2000	Socorro	LINEAR	·	2.7 km	MPC · JPL
138043	2000 DT_{23}	—	February 29, 2000	Socorro	LINEAR	MAS	970 m	MPC · JPL
138044	2000 DW_{24}	—	February 29, 2000	Socorro	LINEAR	·	4.2 km	MPC · JPL
138045	2000 DD_{27}	—	February 29, 2000	Socorro	LINEAR	NYS	1.3 km	MPC · JPL
138046	2000 DQ_{27}	—	February 29, 2000	Socorro	LINEAR	·	1.5 km	MPC · JPL
138047	2000 DS_{30}	—	February 29, 2000	Socorro	LINEAR	·	3.3 km	MPC · JPL
138048	2000 DG_{32}	—	February 29, 2000	Socorro	LINEAR	·	2.8 km	MPC · JPL
138049	2000 DO_{33}	—	February 29, 2000	Socorro	LINEAR	·	2.4 km	MPC · JPL
138050	2000 DJ_{34}	—	February 29, 2000	Socorro	LINEAR	MAS	1.0 km	MPC · JPL
138051	2000 DM_{34}	—	February 29, 2000	Socorro	LINEAR	·	3.1 km	MPC · JPL
138052	2000 DB_{36}	—	February 29, 2000	Socorro	LINEAR	V	1.1 km	MPC · JPL
138053	2000 DL_{37}	—	February 29, 2000	Socorro	LINEAR	·	2.6 km	MPC · JPL
138054	2000 DC_{38}	—	February 29, 2000	Socorro	LINEAR	·	4.1 km	MPC · JPL
138055	2000 DM_{38}	—	February 29, 2000	Socorro	LINEAR	·	2.0 km	MPC · JPL
138056	2000 DN_{38}	—	February 29, 2000	Socorro	LINEAR	·	2.1 km	MPC · JPL
138057	2000 DQ_{38}	—	February 29, 2000	Socorro	LINEAR	·	3.2 km	MPC · JPL
138058	2000 DX_{38}	—	February 29, 2000	Socorro	LINEAR	·	2.3 km	MPC · JPL
138059	2000 DA_{39}	—	February 29, 2000	Socorro	LINEAR	·	2.5 km	MPC · JPL
138060	2000 DC_{39}	—	February 29, 2000	Socorro	LINEAR	·	2.5 km	MPC · JPL
138061	2000 DE_{39}	—	February 29, 2000	Socorro	LINEAR	·	2.0 km	MPC · JPL
138062	2000 DB_{42}	—	February 29, 2000	Socorro	LINEAR	NYS	1.5 km	MPC · JPL
138063	2000 DQ_{43}	—	February 29, 2000	Socorro	LINEAR	·	2.2 km	MPC · JPL
138064	2000 DD_{45}	—	February 29, 2000	Socorro	LINEAR	·	2.3 km	MPC · JPL
138065	2000 DB_{46}	—	February 29, 2000	Socorro	LINEAR	·	2.0 km	MPC · JPL
138066	2000 DO_{47}	—	February 29, 2000	Socorro	LINEAR	·	2.5 km	MPC · JPL
138067	2000 DX_{47}	—	February 29, 2000	Socorro	LINEAR	MAS	1.6 km	MPC · JPL
138068	2000 DE_{51}	—	February 29, 2000	Socorro	LINEAR	·	2.5 km	MPC · JPL
138069	2000 DY_{51}	—	February 29, 2000	Socorro	LINEAR	·	7.2 km	MPC · JPL
138070	2000 DA_{53}	—	February 29, 2000	Socorro	LINEAR	NYS	2.0 km	MPC · JPL
138071	2000 DH_{54}	—	February 29, 2000	Socorro	LINEAR	·	2.3 km	MPC · JPL
138072	2000 DY_{54}	—	February 29, 2000	Socorro	LINEAR	·	1.4 km	MPC · JPL
138073	2000 DJ_{56}	—	February 29, 2000	Socorro	LINEAR	·	1.9 km	MPC · JPL
138074	2000 DD_{57}	—	February 29, 2000	Socorro	LINEAR	·	2.8 km	MPC · JPL
138075	2000 DE_{57}	—	February 29, 2000	Socorro	LINEAR	NYS	2.5 km	MPC · JPL
138076	2000 DQ_{57}	—	February 29, 2000	Socorro	LINEAR	·	4.6 km	MPC · JPL
138077	2000 DV_{57}	—	February 29, 2000	Socorro	LINEAR	NYS	2.2 km	MPC · JPL
138078	2000 DQ_{58}	—	February 29, 2000	Socorro	LINEAR	·	3.0 km	MPC · JPL
138079	2000 DT_{58}	—	February 29, 2000	Socorro	LINEAR	·	2.9 km	MPC · JPL
138080	2000 DA_{59}	—	February 29, 2000	Socorro	LINEAR	·	2.4 km	MPC · JPL
138081	2000 DM_{60}	—	February 29, 2000	Socorro	LINEAR	·	2.3 km	MPC · JPL
138082	2000 DO_{61}	—	February 29, 2000	Socorro	LINEAR	(5)	1.8 km	MPC · JPL
138083	2000 DL_{62}	—	February 29, 2000	Socorro	LINEAR	·	3.6 km	MPC · JPL
138084	2000 DY_{62}	—	February 29, 2000	Socorro	LINEAR	·	2.7 km	MPC · JPL
138085	2000 DZ_{62}	—	February 29, 2000	Socorro	LINEAR	·	2.1 km	MPC · JPL
138086	2000 DD_{64}	—	February 29, 2000	Socorro	LINEAR	(5)	1.7 km	MPC · JPL
138087	2000 DQ_{64}	—	February 29, 2000	Socorro	LINEAR	·	2.2 km	MPC · JPL
138088	2000 DE_{66}	—	February 29, 2000	Socorro	LINEAR	·	1.9 km	MPC · JPL
138089	2000 DQ_{67}	—	February 29, 2000	Socorro	LINEAR	·	3.0 km	MPC · JPL
138090	2000 DS_{68}	—	February 29, 2000	Socorro	LINEAR	NYS	2.4 km	MPC · JPL
138091	2000 DC_{69}	—	February 29, 2000	Socorro	LINEAR	LEO	4.4 km	MPC · JPL
138092	2000 DY_{69}	—	February 29, 2000	Socorro	LINEAR	·	4.7 km	MPC · JPL
138093	2000 DF_{72}	—	February 29, 2000	Socorro	LINEAR	·	3.1 km	MPC · JPL
138094	2000 DR_{72}	—	February 29, 2000	Socorro	LINEAR	·	3.9 km	MPC · JPL
138095	2000 DK_{79}	—	February 26, 2000	Socorro	LINEAR	AMO +1km · PHA · moon	2.3 km	MPC · JPL
138096	2000 DL_{80}	—	February 28, 2000	Socorro	LINEAR	·	3.8 km	MPC · JPL
138097	2000 DZ_{80}	—	February 28, 2000	Socorro	LINEAR	·	2.2 km	MPC · JPL
138098	2000 DK_{81}	—	February 28, 2000	Socorro	LINEAR	·	2.2 km	MPC · JPL
138099	2000 DT_{83}	—	February 28, 2000	Socorro	LINEAR	·	2.6 km	MPC · JPL
138100	2000 DU_{84}	—	February 29, 2000	Socorro	LINEAR	NYS	1.6 km	MPC · JPL

== 138101–138200 ==
back to top

Designation			Discovery			Properties		Ref
Permanent	Provisional	Named after	Date	Site	Discoverer(s)	Category	Diam.	Ref
138101	2000 DM_{86}	—	February 29, 2000	Socorro	LINEAR	·	2.6 km	MPC · JPL
138102	2000 DE_{90}	—	February 27, 2000	Kitt Peak	Spacewatch	·	1.9 km	MPC · JPL
138103	2000 DK_{90}	—	February 27, 2000	Kitt Peak	Spacewatch	·	1.8 km	MPC · JPL
138104	2000 DQ_{92}	—	February 27, 2000	Kitt Peak	Spacewatch	MIS	4.0 km	MPC · JPL
138105	2000 DS_{93}	—	February 28, 2000	Socorro	LINEAR	·	4.0 km	MPC · JPL
138106	2000 DB_{96}	—	February 29, 2000	Socorro	LINEAR	slow	5.1 km	MPC · JPL
138107	2000 DL_{96}	—	February 29, 2000	Socorro	LINEAR	·	2.4 km	MPC · JPL
138108	2000 DC_{102}	—	February 29, 2000	Socorro	LINEAR	WAT	3.9 km	MPC · JPL
138109	2000 DD_{102}	—	February 29, 2000	Socorro	LINEAR	·	2.8 km	MPC · JPL
138110	2000 DW_{102}	—	February 29, 2000	Socorro	LINEAR	·	1.7 km	MPC · JPL
138111	2000 DO_{106}	—	February 29, 2000	Socorro	LINEAR	(5)	2.2 km	MPC · JPL
138112	2000 DB_{107}	—	February 29, 2000	Socorro	LINEAR	·	2.9 km	MPC · JPL
138113	2000 DR_{110}	—	February 27, 2000	Fair Oaks Ranch	J. V. McClusky	HNS	2.1 km	MPC · JPL
138114	2000 DK_{115}	—	February 27, 2000	Catalina	CSS	·	1.6 km	MPC · JPL
138115	2000 DV_{116}	—	February 26, 2000	Kitt Peak	Spacewatch	EUN	2.0 km	MPC · JPL
138116	2000 EZ	—	March 3, 2000	Socorro	LINEAR	·	4.9 km	MPC · JPL
138117	2000 EJ_{2}	—	March 3, 2000	Socorro	LINEAR	·	1.7 km	MPC · JPL
138118	2000 EA_{4}	—	March 1, 2000	Tebbutt	F. B. Zoltowski	NYS	3.0 km	MPC · JPL
138119	2000 EO_{4}	—	March 2, 2000	Kitt Peak	Spacewatch	·	1.9 km	MPC · JPL
138120	2000 ED_{5}	—	March 2, 2000	Kitt Peak	Spacewatch	MAR	1.8 km	MPC · JPL
138121	2000 EK_{8}	—	March 3, 2000	Socorro	LINEAR	MAS	940 m	MPC · JPL
138122	2000 ER_{10}	—	March 4, 2000	Socorro	LINEAR	·	2.5 km	MPC · JPL
138123	2000 ES_{10}	—	March 4, 2000	Socorro	LINEAR	KRM	4.3 km	MPC · JPL
138124	2000 EG_{11}	—	March 4, 2000	Socorro	LINEAR	(5)	1.8 km	MPC · JPL
138125	2000 EE_{12}	—	March 4, 2000	Socorro	LINEAR	V	1.6 km	MPC · JPL
138126	2000 EC_{13}	—	March 4, 2000	Socorro	LINEAR	·	3.2 km	MPC · JPL
138127	2000 EE_{14}	—	March 4, 2000	Socorro	LINEAR	ATE +1km · PHA	750 m	MPC · JPL
138128	2000 ES_{14}	—	March 3, 2000	Socorro	LINEAR	·	3.0 km	MPC · JPL
138129	2000 EH_{17}	—	March 3, 2000	Socorro	LINEAR	·	2.2 km	MPC · JPL
138130	2000 EO_{18}	—	March 5, 2000	Socorro	LINEAR	·	2.5 km	MPC · JPL
138131	2000 ES_{20}	—	March 3, 2000	Catalina	CSS	·	2.4 km	MPC · JPL
138132	2000 EZ_{20}	—	March 3, 2000	Catalina	CSS	EUN	2.7 km	MPC · JPL
138133	2000 EY_{21}	—	March 5, 2000	Socorro	LINEAR	H	900 m	MPC · JPL
138134	2000 ET_{22}	—	March 3, 2000	Kitt Peak	Spacewatch	·	2.0 km	MPC · JPL
138135	2000 EV_{24}	—	March 8, 2000	Kitt Peak	Spacewatch	(5)	2.0 km	MPC · JPL
138136	2000 EE_{29}	—	March 4, 2000	Socorro	LINEAR	EUN	2.8 km	MPC · JPL
138137	2000 EW_{31}	—	March 5, 2000	Socorro	LINEAR	·	1.8 km	MPC · JPL
138138	2000 EQ_{32}	—	March 5, 2000	Socorro	LINEAR	·	2.5 km	MPC · JPL
138139	2000 EV_{43}	—	March 8, 2000	Socorro	LINEAR	·	3.2 km	MPC · JPL
138140	2000 EZ_{43}	—	March 8, 2000	Socorro	LINEAR	·	1.4 km	MPC · JPL
138141	2000 EV_{45}	—	March 9, 2000	Socorro	LINEAR	·	1.9 km	MPC · JPL
138142	2000 EE_{50}	—	March 9, 2000	Tebbutt	F. B. Zoltowski	EUN	2.2 km	MPC · JPL
138143	2000 EL_{54}	—	March 9, 2000	Kitt Peak	Spacewatch	H	780 m	MPC · JPL
138144	2000 EH_{56}	—	March 8, 2000	Socorro	LINEAR	(5)	2.0 km	MPC · JPL
138145	2000 EO_{59}	—	March 10, 2000	Socorro	LINEAR	·	2.3 km	MPC · JPL
138146	2000 EW_{60}	—	March 10, 2000	Socorro	LINEAR	·	1.5 km	MPC · JPL
138147	2000 ER_{61}	—	March 10, 2000	Socorro	LINEAR	·	1.4 km	MPC · JPL
138148	2000 EJ_{63}	—	March 10, 2000	Socorro	LINEAR	NYS	2.1 km	MPC · JPL
138149	2000 EG_{64}	—	March 10, 2000	Socorro	LINEAR	·	1.6 km	MPC · JPL
138150	2000 EY_{64}	—	March 10, 2000	Socorro	LINEAR	·	1.7 km	MPC · JPL
138151	2000 EE_{66}	—	March 10, 2000	Socorro	LINEAR	·	3.1 km	MPC · JPL
138152	2000 EO_{68}	—	March 10, 2000	Socorro	LINEAR	·	1.7 km	MPC · JPL
138153	2000 EW_{68}	—	March 10, 2000	Socorro	LINEAR	·	1.6 km	MPC · JPL
138154	2000 EO_{69}	—	March 10, 2000	Socorro	LINEAR	(21344)	3.1 km	MPC · JPL
138155	2000 ES_{70}	—	March 6, 2000	Haleakala	NEAT	AMO +1km	1.3 km	MPC · JPL
138156	2000 EE_{73}	—	March 10, 2000	Kitt Peak	Spacewatch	(5)	1.6 km	MPC · JPL
138157	2000 EJ_{77}	—	March 5, 2000	Socorro	LINEAR	V	1.6 km	MPC · JPL
138158	2000 ED_{82}	—	March 5, 2000	Socorro	LINEAR	·	3.1 km	MPC · JPL
138159	2000 EC_{85}	—	March 8, 2000	Socorro	LINEAR	·	2.7 km	MPC · JPL
138160	2000 ET_{87}	—	March 8, 2000	Socorro	LINEAR	EUN	2.4 km	MPC · JPL
138161	2000 EB_{88}	—	March 9, 2000	Socorro	LINEAR	(194)	2.9 km	MPC · JPL
138162	2000 EH_{88}	—	March 9, 2000	Socorro	LINEAR	·	2.6 km	MPC · JPL
138163	2000 EK_{93}	—	March 9, 2000	Socorro	LINEAR	·	2.9 km	MPC · JPL
138164	2000 EG_{96}	—	March 11, 2000	Socorro	LINEAR	·	3.2 km	MPC · JPL
138165	2000 EM_{96}	—	March 12, 2000	Socorro	LINEAR	EUN	2.7 km	MPC · JPL
138166	2000 ER_{97}	—	March 10, 2000	Socorro	LINEAR	·	3.4 km	MPC · JPL
138167	2000 EP_{99}	—	March 12, 2000	Kitt Peak	Spacewatch	·	2.3 km	MPC · JPL
138168	2000 EK_{100}	—	March 12, 2000	Kitt Peak	Spacewatch	·	3.0 km	MPC · JPL
138169	2000 EN_{100}	—	March 12, 2000	Kitt Peak	Spacewatch	NYS	1.6 km	MPC · JPL
138170	2000 EP_{100}	—	March 12, 2000	Kitt Peak	Spacewatch	·	1.7 km	MPC · JPL
138171	2000 EK_{102}	—	March 14, 2000	Kitt Peak	Spacewatch	·	2.9 km	MPC · JPL
138172	2000 EU_{102}	—	March 14, 2000	Kitt Peak	Spacewatch	NEM	4.6 km	MPC · JPL
138173	2000 ET_{103}	—	March 12, 2000	Socorro	LINEAR	·	2.8 km	MPC · JPL
138174	2000 EV_{103}	—	March 13, 2000	Socorro	LINEAR	·	1.9 km	MPC · JPL
138175	2000 EE_{104}	—	March 11, 2000	Catalina	CSS	APO · PHA	280 m	MPC · JPL
138176	2000 EM_{105}	—	March 11, 2000	Anderson Mesa	LONEOS	·	3.7 km	MPC · JPL
138177	2000 EP_{105}	—	March 11, 2000	Anderson Mesa	LONEOS	·	2.8 km	MPC · JPL
138178	2000 EK_{106}	—	March 11, 2000	Anderson Mesa	LONEOS	MAR	2.7 km	MPC · JPL
138179	2000 EY_{107}	—	March 8, 2000	Socorro	LINEAR	·	5.7 km	MPC · JPL
138180	2000 EN_{110}	—	March 8, 2000	Haleakala	NEAT	·	3.1 km	MPC · JPL
138181	2000 ET_{110}	—	March 8, 2000	Haleakala	NEAT	·	2.9 km	MPC · JPL
138182	2000 EC_{111}	—	March 8, 2000	Haleakala	NEAT	·	2.9 km	MPC · JPL
138183	2000 EF_{112}	—	March 9, 2000	Socorro	LINEAR	·	3.6 km	MPC · JPL
138184	2000 EQ_{112}	—	March 9, 2000	Socorro	LINEAR	ERI	3.3 km	MPC · JPL
138185	2000 EK_{113}	—	March 9, 2000	Kitt Peak	Spacewatch	(5)	1.7 km	MPC · JPL
138186	2000 EB_{115}	—	March 10, 2000	Kitt Peak	Spacewatch	MRX	1.8 km	MPC · JPL
138187	2000 EJ_{115}	—	March 10, 2000	Kitt Peak	Spacewatch	·	2.7 km	MPC · JPL
138188	2000 EV_{115}	—	March 10, 2000	Kitt Peak	Spacewatch	(12739)	2.2 km	MPC · JPL
138189	2000 EZ_{115}	—	March 10, 2000	Kitt Peak	Spacewatch	·	2.6 km	MPC · JPL
138190	2000 EK_{118}	—	March 11, 2000	Anderson Mesa	LONEOS	MAR	3.1 km	MPC · JPL
138191	2000 EH_{119}	—	March 11, 2000	Anderson Mesa	LONEOS	HNS	2.9 km	MPC · JPL
138192	2000 EA_{120}	—	March 11, 2000	Anderson Mesa	LONEOS	V	1.6 km	MPC · JPL
138193	2000 ER_{124}	—	March 11, 2000	Anderson Mesa	LONEOS	·	1.9 km	MPC · JPL
138194	2000 EA_{127}	—	March 11, 2000	Anderson Mesa	LONEOS	·	2.3 km	MPC · JPL
138195	2000 EG_{128}	—	March 11, 2000	Anderson Mesa	LONEOS	H	1.1 km	MPC · JPL
138196	2000 ES_{129}	—	March 11, 2000	Anderson Mesa	LONEOS	·	2.6 km	MPC · JPL
138197	2000 EG_{131}	—	March 11, 2000	Socorro	LINEAR	H	760 m	MPC · JPL
138198	2000 EV_{131}	—	March 11, 2000	Anderson Mesa	LONEOS	MAR	2.4 km	MPC · JPL
138199	2000 EJ_{132}	—	March 11, 2000	Socorro	LINEAR	·	2.0 km	MPC · JPL
138200 Anderswall	2000 EW_{137}	Anderswall	March 10, 2000	Kvistaberg	Uppsala-DLR Asteroid Survey	EUN	2.1 km	MPC · JPL

== 138201–138300 ==
back to top

Designation			Discovery			Properties		Ref
Permanent	Provisional	Named after	Date	Site	Discoverer(s)	Category	Diam.	Ref
138201	2000 EZ_{137}	—	March 11, 2000	Socorro	LINEAR	·	2.0 km	MPC · JPL
138202	2000 EG_{139}	—	March 11, 2000	Socorro	LINEAR	·	2.2 km	MPC · JPL
138203	2000 EJ_{142}	—	March 3, 2000	Socorro	LINEAR	·	2.1 km	MPC · JPL
138204	2000 EY_{146}	—	March 4, 2000	Socorro	LINEAR	·	2.9 km	MPC · JPL
138205	2000 EZ_{148}	—	March 4, 2000	Catalina	CSS	AMO · APO +1km	3.4 km	MPC · JPL
138206	2000 EJ_{149}	—	March 5, 2000	Socorro	LINEAR	NYS	1.5 km	MPC · JPL
138207	2000 EN_{149}	—	March 5, 2000	Socorro	LINEAR	NYS	1.7 km	MPC · JPL
138208	2000 EN_{162}	—	March 3, 2000	Socorro	LINEAR	·	2.2 km	MPC · JPL
138209	2000 EK_{163}	—	March 3, 2000	Socorro	LINEAR	THM	3.8 km	MPC · JPL
138210	2000 EA_{166}	—	March 3, 2000	Socorro	LINEAR	(5)	2.1 km	MPC · JPL
138211	2000 EF_{167}	—	March 4, 2000	Socorro	LINEAR	·	3.7 km	MPC · JPL
138212	2000 EY_{172}	—	March 1, 2000	Catalina	CSS	·	2.1 km	MPC · JPL
138213	2000 EL_{174}	—	March 3, 2000	Kitt Peak	Spacewatch	·	3.4 km	MPC · JPL
138214	2000 EU_{178}	—	March 4, 2000	Socorro	LINEAR	·	3.3 km	MPC · JPL
138215	2000 EJ_{181}	—	March 4, 2000	Socorro	LINEAR	·	2.7 km	MPC · JPL
138216	2000 EG_{183}	—	March 5, 2000	Socorro	LINEAR	MAR	3.0 km	MPC · JPL
138217	2000 EJ_{192}	—	March 3, 2000	Socorro	LINEAR	·	3.1 km	MPC · JPL
138218	2000 EW_{193}	—	March 3, 2000	Socorro	LINEAR	·	2.6 km	MPC · JPL
138219	2000 EF_{196}	—	March 3, 2000	Socorro	LINEAR	·	1.4 km	MPC · JPL
138220	2000 ET_{196}	—	March 3, 2000	Socorro	LINEAR	·	2.4 km	MPC · JPL
138221 Baldry	2000 EC_{207}	Baldry	March 3, 2000	Apache Point	SDSS	·	1.8 km	MPC · JPL
138222	2000 FU_{3}	—	March 28, 2000	Socorro	LINEAR	·	3.3 km	MPC · JPL
138223	2000 FK_{6}	—	March 25, 2000	Kitt Peak	Spacewatch	·	1.6 km	MPC · JPL
138224	2000 FB_{7}	—	March 29, 2000	Kitt Peak	Spacewatch	·	2.0 km	MPC · JPL
138225	2000 FR_{8}	—	March 29, 2000	Kitt Peak	Spacewatch	·	2.1 km	MPC · JPL
138226	2000 FV_{12}	—	March 28, 2000	Socorro	LINEAR	EUN	3.7 km	MPC · JPL
138227	2000 FK_{16}	—	March 28, 2000	Socorro	LINEAR	·	2.5 km	MPC · JPL
138228	2000 FG_{17}	—	March 28, 2000	Socorro	LINEAR	·	3.4 km	MPC · JPL
138229	2000 FV_{18}	—	March 29, 2000	Socorro	LINEAR	·	3.1 km	MPC · JPL
138230	2000 FE_{19}	—	March 29, 2000	Socorro	LINEAR	·	3.6 km	MPC · JPL
138231	2000 FK_{20}	—	March 29, 2000	Socorro	LINEAR	·	4.4 km	MPC · JPL
138232	2000 FV_{22}	—	March 30, 2000	Socorro	LINEAR	·	2.6 km	MPC · JPL
138233	2000 FM_{23}	—	March 29, 2000	Socorro	LINEAR	·	4.8 km	MPC · JPL
138234	2000 FN_{23}	—	March 29, 2000	Socorro	LINEAR	·	2.7 km	MPC · JPL
138235	2000 FV_{24}	—	March 29, 2000	Socorro	LINEAR	·	3.4 km	MPC · JPL
138236	2000 FA_{25}	—	March 29, 2000	Socorro	LINEAR	slow	2.5 km	MPC · JPL
138237	2000 FQ_{28}	—	March 27, 2000	Anderson Mesa	LONEOS	EUN	2.2 km	MPC · JPL
138238	2000 FQ_{30}	—	March 27, 2000	Anderson Mesa	LONEOS	·	3.6 km	MPC · JPL
138239	2000 FU_{32}	—	March 29, 2000	Socorro	LINEAR	·	2.3 km	MPC · JPL
138240	2000 FP_{33}	—	March 29, 2000	Socorro	LINEAR	·	4.1 km	MPC · JPL
138241	2000 FS_{33}	—	March 29, 2000	Socorro	LINEAR	·	4.3 km	MPC · JPL
138242	2000 FW_{33}	—	March 29, 2000	Socorro	LINEAR	(17392)	3.1 km	MPC · JPL
138243	2000 FQ_{35}	—	March 29, 2000	Socorro	LINEAR	·	3.0 km	MPC · JPL
138244	2000 FJ_{38}	—	March 29, 2000	Socorro	LINEAR	·	2.0 km	MPC · JPL
138245	2000 FG_{40}	—	March 29, 2000	Socorro	LINEAR	·	5.4 km	MPC · JPL
138246	2000 FZ_{46}	—	March 29, 2000	Socorro	LINEAR	·	3.7 km	MPC · JPL
138247	2000 FN_{50}	—	March 29, 2000	Kitt Peak	Spacewatch	(7744)	2.2 km	MPC · JPL
138248	2000 FP_{53}	—	March 30, 2000	Kitt Peak	Spacewatch	·	3.1 km	MPC · JPL
138249	2000 FL_{56}	—	March 29, 2000	Socorro	LINEAR	·	3.3 km	MPC · JPL
138250	2000 FS_{56}	—	March 29, 2000	Socorro	LINEAR	·	2.0 km	MPC · JPL
138251	2000 FH_{57}	—	March 26, 2000	Anderson Mesa	LONEOS	·	2.6 km	MPC · JPL
138252	2000 FM_{58}	—	March 27, 2000	Anderson Mesa	LONEOS	·	2.9 km	MPC · JPL
138253	2000 FB_{60}	—	March 29, 2000	Socorro	LINEAR	NYS	1.7 km	MPC · JPL
138254	2000 FD_{61}	—	March 29, 2000	Socorro	LINEAR	·	3.1 km	MPC · JPL
138255	2000 FJ_{69}	—	March 27, 2000	Anderson Mesa	LONEOS	·	1.6 km	MPC · JPL
138256	2000 FR_{69}	—	March 27, 2000	Kitt Peak	Spacewatch	MAR	1.5 km	MPC · JPL
138257	2000 FR_{70}	—	March 29, 2000	Kitt Peak	Spacewatch	·	1.5 km	MPC · JPL
138258	2000 GD_{2}	—	April 3, 2000	Socorro	LINEAR	ATE	570 m	MPC · JPL
138259	2000 GQ_{3}	—	April 5, 2000	Socorro	LINEAR	H ·	840 m	MPC · JPL
138260	2000 GS_{3}	—	April 5, 2000	Socorro	LINEAR	H	940 m	MPC · JPL
138261	2000 GR_{4}	—	April 5, 2000	Socorro	LINEAR	·	3.6 km	MPC · JPL
138262	2000 GM_{9}	—	April 5, 2000	Socorro	LINEAR	·	3.3 km	MPC · JPL
138263	2000 GW_{9}	—	April 5, 2000	Socorro	LINEAR	·	2.1 km	MPC · JPL
138264	2000 GQ_{11}	—	April 5, 2000	Socorro	LINEAR	·	1.7 km	MPC · JPL
138265	2000 GY_{13}	—	April 5, 2000	Socorro	LINEAR	·	2.4 km	MPC · JPL
138266	2000 GC_{14}	—	April 5, 2000	Socorro	LINEAR	·	2.9 km	MPC · JPL
138267	2000 GQ_{15}	—	April 5, 2000	Socorro	LINEAR	MAR	1.8 km	MPC · JPL
138268	2000 GR_{15}	—	April 5, 2000	Socorro	LINEAR	·	2.8 km	MPC · JPL
138269	2000 GY_{15}	—	April 5, 2000	Socorro	LINEAR	·	2.3 km	MPC · JPL
138270	2000 GZ_{15}	—	April 5, 2000	Socorro	LINEAR	·	2.5 km	MPC · JPL
138271	2000 GS_{16}	—	April 5, 2000	Socorro	LINEAR	·	2.8 km	MPC · JPL
138272	2000 GX_{17}	—	April 5, 2000	Socorro	LINEAR	(5)	1.7 km	MPC · JPL
138273	2000 GL_{19}	—	April 5, 2000	Socorro	LINEAR	·	2.0 km	MPC · JPL
138274	2000 GY_{19}	—	April 5, 2000	Socorro	LINEAR	(5)	1.7 km	MPC · JPL
138275	2000 GG_{20}	—	April 5, 2000	Socorro	LINEAR	·	3.7 km	MPC · JPL
138276	2000 GL_{21}	—	April 8, 2000	Socorro	LINEAR	H	900 m	MPC · JPL
138277	2000 GT_{23}	—	April 5, 2000	Socorro	LINEAR	·	3.3 km	MPC · JPL
138278	2000 GY_{23}	—	April 5, 2000	Socorro	LINEAR	·	3.2 km	MPC · JPL
138279	2000 GB_{24}	—	April 5, 2000	Socorro	LINEAR	(5)	2.7 km	MPC · JPL
138280	2000 GC_{24}	—	April 5, 2000	Socorro	LINEAR	·	3.9 km	MPC · JPL
138281	2000 GM_{25}	—	April 5, 2000	Socorro	LINEAR	·	2.1 km	MPC · JPL
138282	2000 GA_{30}	—	April 5, 2000	Socorro	LINEAR	·	4.6 km	MPC · JPL
138283	2000 GP_{30}	—	April 5, 2000	Socorro	LINEAR	(11882)	2.6 km	MPC · JPL
138284	2000 GS_{30}	—	April 5, 2000	Socorro	LINEAR	·	2.5 km	MPC · JPL
138285	2000 GF_{31}	—	April 5, 2000	Socorro	LINEAR	·	2.6 km	MPC · JPL
138286	2000 GO_{32}	—	April 5, 2000	Socorro	LINEAR	·	2.8 km	MPC · JPL
138287	2000 GB_{33}	—	April 5, 2000	Socorro	LINEAR	·	3.2 km	MPC · JPL
138288	2000 GH_{33}	—	April 5, 2000	Socorro	LINEAR	·	1.6 km	MPC · JPL
138289	2000 GS_{33}	—	April 5, 2000	Socorro	LINEAR	(17392)	2.3 km	MPC · JPL
138290	2000 GW_{33}	—	April 5, 2000	Socorro	LINEAR	·	1.7 km	MPC · JPL
138291	2000 GF_{34}	—	April 5, 2000	Socorro	LINEAR	(5)	2.1 km	MPC · JPL
138292	2000 GE_{37}	—	April 5, 2000	Socorro	LINEAR	(5)	1.8 km	MPC · JPL
138293	2000 GF_{37}	—	April 5, 2000	Socorro	LINEAR	HOF	4.8 km	MPC · JPL
138294	2000 GC_{38}	—	April 5, 2000	Socorro	LINEAR	·	2.7 km	MPC · JPL
138295	2000 GZ_{39}	—	April 5, 2000	Socorro	LINEAR	·	6.9 km	MPC · JPL
138296	2000 GE_{40}	—	April 5, 2000	Socorro	LINEAR	·	2.0 km	MPC · JPL
138297	2000 GQ_{41}	—	April 5, 2000	Socorro	LINEAR	GEF	2.0 km	MPC · JPL
138298	2000 GG_{46}	—	April 5, 2000	Socorro	LINEAR	·	1.6 km	MPC · JPL
138299	2000 GH_{46}	—	April 5, 2000	Socorro	LINEAR	ADE ·	4.4 km	MPC · JPL
138300	2000 GX_{48}	—	April 5, 2000	Socorro	LINEAR	·	2.1 km	MPC · JPL

== 138301–138400 ==
back to top

Designation			Discovery			Properties		Ref
Permanent	Provisional	Named after	Date	Site	Discoverer(s)	Category	Diam.	Ref
138301	2000 GO_{49}	—	April 5, 2000	Socorro	LINEAR	·	3.1 km	MPC · JPL
138302	2000 GH_{53}	—	April 5, 2000	Socorro	LINEAR	·	2.0 km	MPC · JPL
138303	2000 GB_{54}	—	April 5, 2000	Socorro	LINEAR	·	1.6 km	MPC · JPL
138304	2000 GE_{55}	—	April 5, 2000	Socorro	LINEAR	·	2.5 km	MPC · JPL
138305	2000 GV_{57}	—	April 5, 2000	Socorro	LINEAR	MRX	2.0 km	MPC · JPL
138306	2000 GK_{59}	—	April 5, 2000	Socorro	LINEAR	·	2.4 km	MPC · JPL
138307	2000 GT_{59}	—	April 5, 2000	Socorro	LINEAR	·	2.0 km	MPC · JPL
138308	2000 GN_{60}	—	April 5, 2000	Socorro	LINEAR	(32418)	3.6 km	MPC · JPL
138309	2000 GY_{60}	—	April 5, 2000	Socorro	LINEAR	NYS	2.3 km	MPC · JPL
138310	2000 GH_{61}	—	April 5, 2000	Socorro	LINEAR	·	2.7 km	MPC · JPL
138311	2000 GG_{63}	—	April 5, 2000	Socorro	LINEAR	·	3.7 km	MPC · JPL
138312	2000 GY_{63}	—	April 5, 2000	Socorro	LINEAR	·	3.0 km	MPC · JPL
138313	2000 GH_{69}	—	April 5, 2000	Socorro	LINEAR	·	2.9 km	MPC · JPL
138314	2000 GG_{70}	—	April 5, 2000	Socorro	LINEAR	·	4.7 km	MPC · JPL
138315	2000 GQ_{71}	—	April 5, 2000	Socorro	LINEAR	·	3.2 km	MPC · JPL
138316	2000 GG_{73}	—	April 5, 2000	Socorro	LINEAR	·	1.9 km	MPC · JPL
138317	2000 GN_{74}	—	April 5, 2000	Socorro	LINEAR	·	5.3 km	MPC · JPL
138318	2000 GZ_{74}	—	April 5, 2000	Socorro	LINEAR	·	2.7 km	MPC · JPL
138319	2000 GL_{77}	—	April 5, 2000	Socorro	LINEAR	·	1.8 km	MPC · JPL
138320	2000 GR_{79}	—	April 5, 2000	Socorro	LINEAR	·	2.9 km	MPC · JPL
138321	2000 GJ_{80}	—	April 6, 2000	Socorro	LINEAR	NYS	1.7 km	MPC · JPL
138322	2000 GP_{81}	—	April 6, 2000	Socorro	LINEAR	·	2.7 km	MPC · JPL
138323	2000 GT_{81}	—	April 6, 2000	Socorro	LINEAR	H	1.0 km	MPC · JPL
138324	2000 GC_{82}	—	April 7, 2000	Socorro	LINEAR	H	1.2 km	MPC · JPL
138325	2000 GO_{82}	—	April 3, 2000	Socorro	LINEAR	APO +1km	1.6 km	MPC · JPL
138326	2000 GX_{86}	—	April 4, 2000	Socorro	LINEAR	(5)	1.7 km	MPC · JPL
138327	2000 GY_{89}	—	April 4, 2000	Socorro	LINEAR	·	4.2 km	MPC · JPL
138328	2000 GC_{90}	—	April 4, 2000	Socorro	LINEAR	·	2.5 km	MPC · JPL
138329	2000 GG_{90}	—	April 4, 2000	Socorro	LINEAR	HNS	3.5 km	MPC · JPL
138330	2000 GE_{91}	—	April 4, 2000	Socorro	LINEAR	slow	5.0 km	MPC · JPL
138331	2000 GU_{93}	—	April 5, 2000	Socorro	LINEAR	·	5.4 km	MPC · JPL
138332	2000 GJ_{94}	—	April 5, 2000	Socorro	LINEAR	·	3.4 km	MPC · JPL
138333	2000 GK_{97}	—	April 7, 2000	Socorro	LINEAR	MIS	3.7 km	MPC · JPL
138334	2000 GW_{98}	—	April 7, 2000	Socorro	LINEAR	·	2.1 km	MPC · JPL
138335	2000 GW_{100}	—	April 7, 2000	Socorro	LINEAR	·	2.7 km	MPC · JPL
138336	2000 GJ_{102}	—	April 7, 2000	Socorro	LINEAR	·	4.1 km	MPC · JPL
138337	2000 GS_{104}	—	April 7, 2000	Socorro	LINEAR	·	2.4 km	MPC · JPL
138338	2000 GC_{105}	—	April 7, 2000	Socorro	LINEAR	·	2.1 km	MPC · JPL
138339	2000 GT_{105}	—	April 7, 2000	Socorro	LINEAR	·	2.5 km	MPC · JPL
138340	2000 GB_{110}	—	April 2, 2000	Anderson Mesa	LONEOS	MAS	1.3 km	MPC · JPL
138341	2000 GD_{110}	—	April 2, 2000	Anderson Mesa	LONEOS	·	2.4 km	MPC · JPL
138342	2000 GF_{110}	—	April 2, 2000	Anderson Mesa	LONEOS	·	2.1 km	MPC · JPL
138343	2000 GF_{112}	—	April 3, 2000	Anderson Mesa	LONEOS	(18466)	2.0 km	MPC · JPL
138344	2000 GN_{112}	—	April 4, 2000	Socorro	LINEAR	·	3.3 km	MPC · JPL
138345	2000 GW_{112}	—	April 5, 2000	Socorro	LINEAR	·	2.7 km	MPC · JPL
138346	2000 GL_{113}	—	April 6, 2000	Socorro	LINEAR	·	3.9 km	MPC · JPL
138347	2000 GB_{114}	—	April 7, 2000	Socorro	LINEAR	·	2.4 km	MPC · JPL
138348	2000 GN_{114}	—	April 7, 2000	Socorro	LINEAR	(5)	2.6 km	MPC · JPL
138349	2000 GK_{115}	—	April 8, 2000	Socorro	LINEAR	·	3.3 km	MPC · JPL
138350	2000 GT_{115}	—	April 8, 2000	Socorro	LINEAR	ADE	4.7 km	MPC · JPL
138351	2000 GF_{116}	—	April 8, 2000	Socorro	LINEAR	·	2.6 km	MPC · JPL
138352	2000 GS_{116}	—	April 2, 2000	Kitt Peak	Spacewatch	EUN	3.3 km	MPC · JPL
138353	2000 GX_{117}	—	April 2, 2000	Kitt Peak	Spacewatch	·	2.8 km	MPC · JPL
138354	2000 GF_{118}	—	April 2, 2000	Kitt Peak	Spacewatch	MAR	1.5 km	MPC · JPL
138355	2000 GH_{118}	—	April 2, 2000	Kitt Peak	Spacewatch	·	3.5 km	MPC · JPL
138356	2000 GW_{121}	—	April 6, 2000	Kitt Peak	Spacewatch	GEF	2.2 km	MPC · JPL
138357	2000 GB_{123}	—	April 8, 2000	Socorro	LINEAR	H	1.1 km	MPC · JPL
138358	2000 GL_{127}	—	April 8, 2000	Socorro	LINEAR	·	3.3 km	MPC · JPL
138359	2000 GX_{127}	—	April 10, 2000	Kitt Peak	Spacewatch	APO +1km	1.1 km	MPC · JPL
138360	2000 GA_{130}	—	April 5, 2000	Kitt Peak	Spacewatch	·	1.7 km	MPC · JPL
138361	2000 GZ_{131}	—	April 8, 2000	Kitt Peak	Spacewatch	·	1.9 km	MPC · JPL
138362	2000 GP_{132}	—	April 12, 2000	Haleakala	NEAT	H	1.1 km	MPC · JPL
138363	2000 GO_{137}	—	April 8, 2000	Socorro	LINEAR	·	3.7 km	MPC · JPL
138364	2000 GU_{138}	—	April 4, 2000	Anderson Mesa	LONEOS	·	3.1 km	MPC · JPL
138365	2000 GG_{139}	—	April 4, 2000	Anderson Mesa	LONEOS	·	3.4 km	MPC · JPL
138366	2000 GH_{139}	—	April 4, 2000	Anderson Mesa	LONEOS	·	3.7 km	MPC · JPL
138367	2000 GJ_{139}	—	April 4, 2000	Anderson Mesa	LONEOS	·	2.0 km	MPC · JPL
138368	2000 GE_{140}	—	April 4, 2000	Anderson Mesa	LONEOS	·	1.7 km	MPC · JPL
138369	2000 GL_{140}	—	April 4, 2000	Anderson Mesa	LONEOS	NYS	2.3 km	MPC · JPL
138370	2000 GS_{143}	—	April 7, 2000	Anderson Mesa	LONEOS	·	3.5 km	MPC · JPL
138371	2000 GK_{144}	—	April 7, 2000	Kitt Peak	Spacewatch	·	3.2 km	MPC · JPL
138372	2000 GN_{144}	—	April 7, 2000	Kitt Peak	Spacewatch	·	3.3 km	MPC · JPL
138373	2000 GQ_{150}	—	April 5, 2000	Socorro	LINEAR	(5)	2.9 km	MPC · JPL
138374	2000 GA_{151}	—	April 5, 2000	Socorro	LINEAR	·	2.0 km	MPC · JPL
138375	2000 GS_{151}	—	April 5, 2000	Kitt Peak	Spacewatch	(5)	2.0 km	MPC · JPL
138376	2000 GV_{152}	—	April 6, 2000	Anderson Mesa	LONEOS	(5)	2.7 km	MPC · JPL
138377	2000 GX_{153}	—	April 6, 2000	Anderson Mesa	LONEOS	PHO	2.1 km	MPC · JPL
138378	2000 GP_{154}	—	April 6, 2000	Anderson Mesa	LONEOS	·	2.0 km	MPC · JPL
138379	2000 GD_{157}	—	April 6, 2000	Socorro	LINEAR	WIT	1.7 km	MPC · JPL
138380	2000 GM_{157}	—	April 7, 2000	Socorro	LINEAR	EUN	4.0 km	MPC · JPL
138381	2000 GL_{162}	—	April 8, 2000	Socorro	LINEAR	·	3.3 km	MPC · JPL
138382	2000 GM_{162}	—	April 8, 2000	Socorro	LINEAR	·	3.2 km	MPC · JPL
138383	2000 GA_{163}	—	April 9, 2000	Anderson Mesa	LONEOS	·	3.9 km	MPC · JPL
138384	2000 GJ_{164}	—	April 5, 2000	Socorro	LINEAR	·	1.7 km	MPC · JPL
138385	2000 GZ_{168}	—	April 4, 2000	Socorro	LINEAR	H	1.1 km	MPC · JPL
138386	2000 GF_{169}	—	April 4, 2000	Socorro	LINEAR	·	2.6 km	MPC · JPL
138387	2000 GY_{172}	—	April 2, 2000	Anderson Mesa	LONEOS	EUN	3.5 km	MPC · JPL
138388	2000 GX_{173}	—	April 5, 2000	Anderson Mesa	LONEOS	HIL · 3:2	10 km	MPC · JPL
138389	2000 GS_{174}	—	April 2, 2000	Kitt Peak	Spacewatch	·	2.8 km	MPC · JPL
138390	2000 GB_{175}	—	April 3, 2000	Kitt Peak	Spacewatch	·	2.5 km	MPC · JPL
138391	2000 GK_{177}	—	April 3, 2000	Kitt Peak	Spacewatch	·	2.5 km	MPC · JPL
138392	2000 HY	—	April 24, 2000	Kitt Peak	Spacewatch	·	3.9 km	MPC · JPL
138393	2000 HF_{3}	—	April 26, 2000	Kitt Peak	Spacewatch	·	3.6 km	MPC · JPL
138394	2000 HA_{4}	—	April 26, 2000	Kitt Peak	Spacewatch	·	2.9 km	MPC · JPL
138395	2000 HD_{5}	—	April 27, 2000	Socorro	LINEAR	·	4.2 km	MPC · JPL
138396	2000 HV_{7}	—	April 27, 2000	Socorro	LINEAR	GEF	2.4 km	MPC · JPL
138397	2000 HB_{11}	—	April 27, 2000	Socorro	LINEAR	·	3.6 km	MPC · JPL
138398	2000 HG_{11}	—	April 27, 2000	Socorro	LINEAR	·	3.6 km	MPC · JPL
138399	2000 HK_{11}	—	April 28, 2000	Socorro	LINEAR	·	2.7 km	MPC · JPL
138400	2000 HL_{12}	—	April 28, 2000	Socorro	LINEAR	·	3.2 km	MPC · JPL

== 138401–138500 ==
back to top

Designation			Discovery			Properties		Ref
Permanent	Provisional	Named after	Date	Site	Discoverer(s)	Category	Diam.	Ref
138401	2000 HB_{13}	—	April 28, 2000	Socorro	LINEAR	·	3.4 km	MPC · JPL
138402	2000 HN_{14}	—	April 27, 2000	Socorro	LINEAR	·	1.3 km	MPC · JPL
138403	2000 HM_{21}	—	April 27, 2000	Socorro	LINEAR	·	2.9 km	MPC · JPL
138404	2000 HA_{24}	—	April 28, 2000	Socorro	LINEAR	APO · PHA	470 m	MPC · JPL
138405	2000 HV_{24}	—	April 24, 2000	Anderson Mesa	LONEOS	(194)	4.4 km	MPC · JPL
138406	2000 HN_{27}	—	April 28, 2000	Socorro	LINEAR	·	4.2 km	MPC · JPL
138407	2000 HR_{27}	—	April 28, 2000	Socorro	LINEAR	H	1.1 km	MPC · JPL
138408	2000 HY_{28}	—	April 30, 2000	Socorro	LINEAR	PHO	2.3 km	MPC · JPL
138409	2000 HH_{30}	—	April 28, 2000	Socorro	LINEAR	·	2.4 km	MPC · JPL
138410	2000 HV_{31}	—	April 29, 2000	Socorro	LINEAR	HNS	2.4 km	MPC · JPL
138411	2000 HY_{33}	—	April 25, 2000	Anderson Mesa	LONEOS	H	1.0 km	MPC · JPL
138412	2000 HD_{34}	—	April 25, 2000	Anderson Mesa	LONEOS	EUN	2.5 km	MPC · JPL
138413	2000 HW_{39}	—	April 30, 2000	Kitt Peak	Spacewatch	·	4.3 km	MPC · JPL
138414	2000 HY_{41}	—	April 29, 2000	Socorro	LINEAR	(5)	2.2 km	MPC · JPL
138415	2000 HM_{44}	—	April 26, 2000	Anderson Mesa	LONEOS	·	4.1 km	MPC · JPL
138416	2000 HB_{45}	—	April 26, 2000	Anderson Mesa	LONEOS	·	2.1 km	MPC · JPL
138417	2000 HN_{48}	—	April 29, 2000	Socorro	LINEAR	·	2.3 km	MPC · JPL
138418	2000 HZ_{48}	—	April 29, 2000	Socorro	LINEAR	BRG	3.8 km	MPC · JPL
138419	2000 HU_{56}	—	April 24, 2000	Anderson Mesa	LONEOS	·	5.2 km	MPC · JPL
138420	2000 HA_{57}	—	April 24, 2000	Anderson Mesa	LONEOS	·	2.6 km	MPC · JPL
138421	2000 HJ_{59}	—	April 25, 2000	Anderson Mesa	LONEOS	·	2.3 km	MPC · JPL
138422	2000 HP_{60}	—	April 25, 2000	Anderson Mesa	LONEOS	·	2.6 km	MPC · JPL
138423	2000 HB_{64}	—	April 26, 2000	Anderson Mesa	LONEOS	·	1.8 km	MPC · JPL
138424	2000 HP_{66}	—	April 26, 2000	Kitt Peak	Spacewatch	·	2.4 km	MPC · JPL
138425	2000 HV_{68}	—	April 29, 2000	Socorro	LINEAR	·	2.7 km	MPC · JPL
138426	2000 HY_{69}	—	April 26, 2000	Anderson Mesa	LONEOS	·	4.2 km	MPC · JPL
138427	2000 HG_{75}	—	April 27, 2000	Socorro	LINEAR	·	6.3 km	MPC · JPL
138428	2000 HG_{77}	—	April 28, 2000	Anderson Mesa	LONEOS	·	3.2 km	MPC · JPL
138429	2000 HP_{77}	—	April 28, 2000	Anderson Mesa	LONEOS	EUN	2.5 km	MPC · JPL
138430	2000 HS_{80}	—	April 28, 2000	Anderson Mesa	LONEOS	·	4.2 km	MPC · JPL
138431	2000 HZ_{81}	—	April 29, 2000	Socorro	LINEAR	GEF	2.6 km	MPC · JPL
138432	2000 HM_{82}	—	April 29, 2000	Socorro	LINEAR	AGN	1.9 km	MPC · JPL
138433	2000 HV_{82}	—	April 29, 2000	Socorro	LINEAR	·	2.5 km	MPC · JPL
138434	2000 HF_{83}	—	April 29, 2000	Socorro	LINEAR	·	2.0 km	MPC · JPL
138435	2000 HX_{87}	—	April 27, 2000	Socorro	LINEAR	·	4.2 km	MPC · JPL
138436	2000 HA_{89}	—	April 29, 2000	Socorro	LINEAR	·	2.1 km	MPC · JPL
138437	2000 HN_{89}	—	April 29, 2000	Socorro	LINEAR	TIN	4.2 km	MPC · JPL
138438	2000 HG_{95}	—	April 28, 2000	Socorro	LINEAR	·	2.5 km	MPC · JPL
138439	2000 HD_{98}	—	April 26, 2000	Ondřejov	Ondrejov	·	2.6 km	MPC · JPL
138440	2000 HP_{99}	—	April 26, 2000	Anderson Mesa	LONEOS	·	2.2 km	MPC · JPL
138441	2000 HB_{100}	—	April 27, 2000	Socorro	LINEAR	·	3.8 km	MPC · JPL
138442	2000 HN_{103}	—	April 27, 2000	Anderson Mesa	LONEOS	GEF	2.7 km	MPC · JPL
138443	2000 HR_{104}	—	April 25, 2000	Kitt Peak	Spacewatch	·	3.3 km	MPC · JPL
138444	2000 JS_{1}	—	May 1, 2000	Socorro	LINEAR	KRM	3.7 km	MPC · JPL
138445 Westenburger	2000 JF_{2}	Westenburger	May 2, 2000	Drebach	J. Kandler	·	1.9 km	MPC · JPL
138446	2000 JP_{4}	—	May 1, 2000	Kitt Peak	Spacewatch	·	4.3 km	MPC · JPL
138447	2000 JQ_{6}	—	May 4, 2000	Socorro	LINEAR	·	3.0 km	MPC · JPL
138448	2000 JV_{7}	—	May 4, 2000	Kitt Peak	Spacewatch	(5)	3.5 km	MPC · JPL
138449	2000 JF_{8}	—	May 5, 2000	Kitt Peak	Spacewatch	·	3.3 km	MPC · JPL
138450	2000 JQ_{8}	—	May 4, 2000	Socorro	LINEAR	H	1.2 km	MPC · JPL
138451	2000 JR_{9}	—	May 3, 2000	Socorro	LINEAR	·	4.0 km	MPC · JPL
138452	2000 JO_{10}	—	May 7, 2000	Socorro	LINEAR	·	2.5 km	MPC · JPL
138453	2000 JO_{11}	—	May 3, 2000	Socorro	LINEAR	·	5.6 km	MPC · JPL
138454	2000 JQ_{11}	—	May 3, 2000	Socorro	LINEAR	·	3.5 km	MPC · JPL
138455	2000 JQ_{13}	—	May 6, 2000	Socorro	LINEAR	·	4.5 km	MPC · JPL
138456	2000 JD_{21}	—	May 6, 2000	Socorro	LINEAR	·	5.3 km	MPC · JPL
138457	2000 JN_{23}	—	May 7, 2000	Socorro	LINEAR	·	4.3 km	MPC · JPL
138458	2000 JS_{24}	—	May 7, 2000	Socorro	LINEAR	·	3.9 km	MPC · JPL
138459	2000 JQ_{31}	—	May 7, 2000	Socorro	LINEAR	MRX	2.3 km	MPC · JPL
138460	2000 JP_{33}	—	May 7, 2000	Socorro	LINEAR	JUN	1.8 km	MPC · JPL
138461	2000 JA_{35}	—	May 7, 2000	Socorro	LINEAR	·	2.9 km	MPC · JPL
138462	2000 JO_{41}	—	May 7, 2000	Socorro	LINEAR	·	2.3 km	MPC · JPL
138463	2000 JV_{41}	—	May 7, 2000	Socorro	LINEAR	EUN	1.8 km	MPC · JPL
138464	2000 JJ_{42}	—	May 7, 2000	Socorro	LINEAR	·	2.4 km	MPC · JPL
138465	2000 JV_{42}	—	May 7, 2000	Socorro	LINEAR	KON	3.6 km	MPC · JPL
138466	2000 JO_{43}	—	May 7, 2000	Socorro	LINEAR	·	3.9 km	MPC · JPL
138467	2000 JL_{44}	—	May 7, 2000	Socorro	LINEAR	·	3.5 km	MPC · JPL
138468	2000 JW_{44}	—	May 7, 2000	Socorro	LINEAR	·	1.7 km	MPC · JPL
138469	2000 JJ_{56}	—	May 6, 2000	Socorro	LINEAR	DOR	5.7 km	MPC · JPL
138470	2000 JF_{60}	—	May 7, 2000	Socorro	LINEAR	·	2.3 km	MPC · JPL
138471	2000 JC_{75}	—	May 5, 2000	Anderson Mesa	LONEOS	·	5.7 km	MPC · JPL
138472	2000 JB_{77}	—	May 7, 2000	Socorro	LINEAR	·	4.0 km	MPC · JPL
138473	2000 JT_{78}	—	May 4, 2000	Kitt Peak	Spacewatch	·	3.2 km	MPC · JPL
138474	2000 JP_{79}	—	May 5, 2000	Socorro	LINEAR	NYS	2.4 km	MPC · JPL
138475	2000 JD_{84}	—	May 5, 2000	Socorro	LINEAR	·	3.4 km	MPC · JPL
138476	2000 JJ_{85}	—	May 4, 2000	Anderson Mesa	LONEOS	·	4.5 km	MPC · JPL
138477	2000 JY_{86}	—	May 1, 2000	Kitt Peak	Spacewatch	·	6.1 km	MPC · JPL
138478	2000 JF_{87}	—	May 2, 2000	McDonald	Farnham, T. L.	·	2.7 km	MPC · JPL
138479	2000 KU_{2}	—	May 26, 2000	Socorro	LINEAR	·	7.5 km	MPC · JPL
138480	2000 KZ_{2}	—	May 27, 2000	Socorro	LINEAR	H	890 m	MPC · JPL
138481	2000 KD_{3}	—	May 26, 2000	Kitt Peak	Spacewatch	·	3.8 km	MPC · JPL
138482	2000 KR_{4}	—	May 27, 2000	Socorro	LINEAR	H	870 m	MPC · JPL
138483	2000 KT_{7}	—	May 27, 2000	Socorro	LINEAR	MIS	3.4 km	MPC · JPL
138484	2000 KD_{9}	—	May 28, 2000	Socorro	LINEAR	DOR	5.1 km	MPC · JPL
138485	2000 KY_{9}	—	May 28, 2000	Socorro	LINEAR	(194)	3.1 km	MPC · JPL
138486	2000 KH_{11}	—	May 28, 2000	Socorro	LINEAR	·	3.5 km	MPC · JPL
138487	2000 KF_{15}	—	May 28, 2000	Socorro	LINEAR	ADE	3.2 km	MPC · JPL
138488	2000 KY_{16}	—	May 28, 2000	Socorro	LINEAR	·	2.8 km	MPC · JPL
138489	2000 KL_{17}	—	May 28, 2000	Socorro	LINEAR	MAS	1.4 km	MPC · JPL
138490	2000 KK_{20}	—	May 28, 2000	Socorro	LINEAR	·	2.1 km	MPC · JPL
138491	2000 KE_{27}	—	May 28, 2000	Socorro	LINEAR	GEF	3.1 km	MPC · JPL
138492	2000 KF_{34}	—	May 27, 2000	Socorro	LINEAR	·	2.7 km	MPC · JPL
138493	2000 KQ_{35}	—	May 27, 2000	Socorro	LINEAR	·	1.7 km	MPC · JPL
138494	2000 KD_{37}	—	May 24, 2000	Kitt Peak	Spacewatch	AGN	2.1 km	MPC · JPL
138495	2000 KG_{37}	—	May 24, 2000	Kitt Peak	Spacewatch	MRX	1.8 km	MPC · JPL
138496	2000 KE_{38}	—	May 24, 2000	Kitt Peak	Spacewatch	·	2.6 km	MPC · JPL
138497	2000 KS_{42}	—	May 25, 2000	Kitt Peak	Spacewatch	·	2.5 km	MPC · JPL
138498	2000 KV_{42}	—	May 25, 2000	Kitt Peak	Spacewatch	AGN	2.1 km	MPC · JPL
138499	2000 KE_{43}	—	May 26, 2000	Kitt Peak	Spacewatch	·	4.4 km	MPC · JPL
138500	2000 KF_{51}	—	May 30, 2000	Kitt Peak	Spacewatch	·	3.5 km	MPC · JPL

== 138501–138600 ==
back to top

Designation			Discovery			Properties		Ref
Permanent	Provisional	Named after	Date	Site	Discoverer(s)	Category	Diam.	Ref
138501	2000 KH_{52}	—	May 23, 2000	Anderson Mesa	LONEOS	·	2.3 km	MPC · JPL
138502	2000 KQ_{52}	—	May 24, 2000	Anderson Mesa	LONEOS	DOR	5.0 km	MPC · JPL
138503	2000 KC_{58}	—	May 24, 2000	Anderson Mesa	LONEOS	·	2.5 km	MPC · JPL
138504	2000 KW_{62}	—	May 26, 2000	Anderson Mesa	LONEOS	·	2.8 km	MPC · JPL
138505	2000 KY_{63}	—	May 26, 2000	Anderson Mesa	LONEOS	·	4.0 km	MPC · JPL
138506	2000 KP_{64}	—	May 27, 2000	Socorro	LINEAR	·	4.1 km	MPC · JPL
138507	2000 KA_{68}	—	May 30, 2000	Socorro	LINEAR	·	3.5 km	MPC · JPL
138508	2000 KO_{69}	—	May 29, 2000	Socorro	LINEAR	H	1.2 km	MPC · JPL
138509	2000 KO_{72}	—	May 28, 2000	Socorro	LINEAR	·	5.9 km	MPC · JPL
138510	2000 KT_{73}	—	May 27, 2000	Socorro	LINEAR	·	2.3 km	MPC · JPL
138511	2000 KZ_{82}	—	May 25, 2000	Anderson Mesa	LONEOS	·	5.6 km	MPC · JPL
138512	2000 LE_{3}	—	June 3, 2000	Anderson Mesa	LONEOS	T_{j} (2.85)	12 km	MPC · JPL
138513	2000 LT_{6}	—	June 1, 2000	Kitt Peak	Spacewatch	·	3.8 km	MPC · JPL
138514	2000 LA_{10}	—	June 7, 2000	Socorro	LINEAR	H	1.2 km	MPC · JPL
138515	2000 LN_{24}	—	June 1, 2000	Socorro	LINEAR	·	4.3 km	MPC · JPL
138516	2000 LM_{32}	—	June 4, 2000	Socorro	LINEAR	·	2.9 km	MPC · JPL
138517	2000 LO_{32}	—	June 4, 2000	Socorro	LINEAR	·	3.3 km	MPC · JPL
138518	2000 NB_{7}	—	July 4, 2000	Kitt Peak	Spacewatch	·	2.8 km	MPC · JPL
138519	2000 NE_{12}	—	July 5, 2000	Anderson Mesa	LONEOS	·	5.0 km	MPC · JPL
138520	2000 NK_{14}	—	July 5, 2000	Anderson Mesa	LONEOS	·	8.5 km	MPC · JPL
138521	2000 NL_{18}	—	July 5, 2000	Anderson Mesa	LONEOS	EOS	3.7 km	MPC · JPL
138522	2000 NW_{19}	—	July 5, 2000	Anderson Mesa	LONEOS	TIR	8.8 km	MPC · JPL
138523	2000 NL_{20}	—	July 6, 2000	Kitt Peak	Spacewatch	TIR	6.3 km	MPC · JPL
138524	2000 OJ_{8}	—	July 30, 2000	Socorro	LINEAR	AMO +1km · PHA	1.5 km	MPC · JPL
138525	2000 OP_{8}	—	July 23, 2000	Socorro	LINEAR	H	930 m	MPC · JPL
138526	2000 OR_{8}	—	July 23, 2000	Socorro	LINEAR	H	1.4 km	MPC · JPL
138527	2000 OJ_{20}	—	July 30, 2000	Socorro	LINEAR	·	8.0 km	MPC · JPL
138528	2000 OX_{21}	—	July 30, 2000	Reedy Creek	J. Broughton	·	7.0 km	MPC · JPL
138529	2000 OB_{31}	—	July 30, 2000	Socorro	LINEAR	·	6.4 km	MPC · JPL
138530	2000 OJ_{34}	—	July 30, 2000	Socorro	LINEAR	·	6.8 km	MPC · JPL
138531	2000 OC_{38}	—	July 30, 2000	Socorro	LINEAR	·	7.7 km	MPC · JPL
138532	2000 OA_{40}	—	July 30, 2000	Socorro	LINEAR	·	3.2 km	MPC · JPL
138533	2000 OF_{40}	—	July 30, 2000	Socorro	LINEAR	·	9.5 km	MPC · JPL
138534	2000 OT_{41}	—	July 30, 2000	Socorro	LINEAR	EOS	3.7 km	MPC · JPL
138535	2000 OO_{57}	—	July 29, 2000	Anderson Mesa	LONEOS	·	5.7 km	MPC · JPL
138536	2000 OZ_{59}	—	July 29, 2000	Anderson Mesa	LONEOS	·	6.7 km	MPC · JPL
138537	2000 OK_{67}	—	July 29, 2000	Cerro Tololo	M. W. Buie, Kern, S. D.	cubewano (cold)	164 km	MPC · JPL
138538	2000 PL_{3}	—	August 1, 2000	Socorro	LINEAR	H	1.0 km	MPC · JPL
138539	2000 PB_{6}	—	August 5, 2000	Haleakala	NEAT	T_{j} (2.99) · EUP	7.1 km	MPC · JPL
138540	2000 PZ_{14}	—	August 1, 2000	Socorro	LINEAR	·	6.3 km	MPC · JPL
138541	2000 PV_{20}	—	August 1, 2000	Socorro	LINEAR	·	3.6 km	MPC · JPL
138542	2000 PK_{25}	—	August 3, 2000	Kitt Peak	Spacewatch	·	4.8 km	MPC · JPL
138543	2000 QR_{6}	—	August 25, 2000	Gnosca	S. Sposetti	·	7.4 km	MPC · JPL
138544	2000 QY_{9}	—	August 24, 2000	Socorro	LINEAR	·	4.3 km	MPC · JPL
138545	2000 QD_{11}	—	August 24, 2000	Socorro	LINEAR	·	6.1 km	MPC · JPL
138546	2000 QM_{12}	—	August 24, 2000	Socorro	LINEAR	·	3.9 km	MPC · JPL
138547	2000 QA_{15}	—	August 24, 2000	Socorro	LINEAR	·	2.3 km	MPC · JPL
138548	2000 QN_{16}	—	August 24, 2000	Socorro	LINEAR	EOS	3.6 km	MPC · JPL
138549	2000 QY_{21}	—	August 24, 2000	Socorro	LINEAR	TIR ·	5.4 km	MPC · JPL
138550	2000 QD_{31}	—	August 26, 2000	Socorro	LINEAR	slow	6.6 km	MPC · JPL
138551	2000 QF_{32}	—	August 26, 2000	Socorro	LINEAR	·	5.4 km	MPC · JPL
138552	2000 QF_{33}	—	August 26, 2000	Socorro	LINEAR	·	3.4 km	MPC · JPL
138553	2000 QZ_{40}	—	August 24, 2000	Socorro	LINEAR	EMA	6.2 km	MPC · JPL
138554	2000 QN_{44}	—	August 24, 2000	Socorro	LINEAR	·	2.9 km	MPC · JPL
138555	2000 QS_{44}	—	August 24, 2000	Socorro	LINEAR	·	3.2 km	MPC · JPL
138556	2000 QC_{47}	—	August 24, 2000	Socorro	LINEAR	·	4.7 km	MPC · JPL
138557	2000 QS_{47}	—	August 24, 2000	Socorro	LINEAR	·	5.8 km	MPC · JPL
138558	2000 QP_{51}	—	August 24, 2000	Socorro	LINEAR	·	5.0 km	MPC · JPL
138559	2000 QZ_{56}	—	August 26, 2000	Socorro	LINEAR	THM	3.6 km	MPC · JPL
138560	2000 QM_{59}	—	August 26, 2000	Socorro	LINEAR	·	6.0 km	MPC · JPL
138561	2000 QY_{66}	—	August 28, 2000	Socorro	LINEAR	·	1.4 km	MPC · JPL
138562	2000 QC_{68}	—	August 28, 2000	Socorro	LINEAR	·	5.3 km	MPC · JPL
138563	2000 QE_{69}	—	August 27, 2000	Fair Oaks Ranch	J. V. McClusky	·	7.3 km	MPC · JPL
138564	2000 QH_{74}	—	August 24, 2000	Socorro	LINEAR	·	5.1 km	MPC · JPL
138565	2000 QG_{76}	—	August 24, 2000	Socorro	LINEAR	·	7.0 km	MPC · JPL
138566	2000 QS_{78}	—	August 24, 2000	Socorro	LINEAR	·	6.7 km	MPC · JPL
138567	2000 QU_{79}	—	August 24, 2000	Socorro	LINEAR	·	4.2 km	MPC · JPL
138568	2000 QK_{81}	—	August 24, 2000	Socorro	LINEAR	EOS	3.3 km	MPC · JPL
138569	2000 QQ_{81}	—	August 24, 2000	Socorro	LINEAR	VER	6.3 km	MPC · JPL
138570	2000 QS_{84}	—	August 25, 2000	Socorro	LINEAR	·	1.4 km	MPC · JPL
138571	2000 QY_{87}	—	August 25, 2000	Socorro	LINEAR	·	6.0 km	MPC · JPL
138572	2000 QV_{92}	—	August 25, 2000	Socorro	LINEAR	·	6.6 km	MPC · JPL
138573	2000 QB_{107}	—	August 29, 2000	Socorro	LINEAR	·	6.2 km	MPC · JPL
138574	2000 QS_{109}	—	August 31, 2000	Kitt Peak	Spacewatch	EOS	3.4 km	MPC · JPL
138575	2000 QG_{114}	—	August 24, 2000	Socorro	LINEAR	·	5.2 km	MPC · JPL
138576	2000 QU_{114}	—	August 24, 2000	Socorro	LINEAR	·	5.1 km	MPC · JPL
138577	2000 QX_{122}	—	August 25, 2000	Socorro	LINEAR	T_{j} (2.99)	9.6 km	MPC · JPL
138578	2000 QL_{124}	—	August 28, 2000	Socorro	LINEAR	·	8.4 km	MPC · JPL
138579	2000 QA_{132}	—	August 26, 2000	Socorro	LINEAR	TIR	5.7 km	MPC · JPL
138580	2000 QC_{132}	—	August 26, 2000	Socorro	LINEAR	·	7.8 km	MPC · JPL
138581	2000 QQ_{133}	—	August 26, 2000	Socorro	LINEAR	·	4.6 km	MPC · JPL
138582	2000 QP_{134}	—	August 26, 2000	Socorro	LINEAR	·	4.9 km	MPC · JPL
138583	2000 QF_{136}	—	August 29, 2000	Socorro	LINEAR	·	5.1 km	MPC · JPL
138584	2000 QC_{139}	—	August 31, 2000	Socorro	LINEAR	·	6.9 km	MPC · JPL
138585	2000 QG_{140}	—	August 31, 2000	Socorro	LINEAR	·	5.4 km	MPC · JPL
138586	2000 QL_{142}	—	August 31, 2000	Socorro	LINEAR	·	5.2 km	MPC · JPL
138587	2000 QF_{143}	—	August 31, 2000	Socorro	LINEAR	·	3.7 km	MPC · JPL
138588	2000 QY_{146}	—	August 31, 2000	Socorro	LINEAR	·	1.7 km	MPC · JPL
138589	2000 QC_{154}	—	August 31, 2000	Socorro	LINEAR	EOS	4.2 km	MPC · JPL
138590	2000 QN_{154}	—	August 31, 2000	Socorro	LINEAR	·	4.4 km	MPC · JPL
138591	2000 QB_{156}	—	August 31, 2000	Socorro	LINEAR	EOS	3.4 km	MPC · JPL
138592	2000 QD_{160}	—	August 31, 2000	Socorro	LINEAR	EOS	4.3 km	MPC · JPL
138593	2000 QH_{160}	—	August 31, 2000	Socorro	LINEAR	·	6.3 km	MPC · JPL
138594	2000 QM_{160}	—	August 31, 2000	Socorro	LINEAR	·	6.8 km	MPC · JPL
138595	2000 QD_{161}	—	August 31, 2000	Socorro	LINEAR	·	4.8 km	MPC · JPL
138596	2000 QL_{161}	—	August 31, 2000	Socorro	LINEAR	LIX	5.0 km	MPC · JPL
138597	2000 QZ_{161}	—	August 31, 2000	Socorro	LINEAR	·	7.6 km	MPC · JPL
138598	2000 QV_{164}	—	August 31, 2000	Socorro	LINEAR	VER	5.0 km	MPC · JPL
138599	2000 QO_{166}	—	August 31, 2000	Socorro	LINEAR	·	3.3 km	MPC · JPL
138600	2000 QJ_{174}	—	August 31, 2000	Socorro	LINEAR	EOS	3.4 km	MPC · JPL

== 138601–138700 ==
back to top

Designation			Discovery			Properties		Ref
Permanent	Provisional	Named after	Date	Site	Discoverer(s)	Category	Diam.	Ref
138601	2000 QK_{175}	—	August 31, 2000	Socorro	LINEAR	·	5.1 km	MPC · JPL
138602	2000 QY_{176}	—	August 31, 2000	Socorro	LINEAR	·	5.1 km	MPC · JPL
138603	2000 QG_{177}	—	August 31, 2000	Socorro	LINEAR	·	5.9 km	MPC · JPL
138604	2000 QO_{177}	—	August 31, 2000	Socorro	LINEAR	·	3.4 km	MPC · JPL
138605	2000 QW_{177}	—	August 31, 2000	Socorro	LINEAR	·	5.2 km	MPC · JPL
138606	2000 QR_{179}	—	August 31, 2000	Socorro	LINEAR	·	6.6 km	MPC · JPL
138607	2000 QF_{184}	—	August 26, 2000	Socorro	LINEAR	·	7.9 km	MPC · JPL
138608	2000 QX_{184}	—	August 26, 2000	Socorro	LINEAR	·	7.9 km	MPC · JPL
138609	2000 QH_{188}	—	August 26, 2000	Socorro	LINEAR	·	5.4 km	MPC · JPL
138610	2000 QY_{188}	—	August 26, 2000	Socorro	LINEAR	·	7.7 km	MPC · JPL
138611	2000 QJ_{189}	—	August 26, 2000	Socorro	LINEAR	·	7.6 km	MPC · JPL
138612	2000 QM_{194}	—	August 31, 2000	Socorro	LINEAR	EOS	3.7 km	MPC · JPL
138613	2000 QV_{196}	—	August 29, 2000	Socorro	LINEAR	·	7.2 km	MPC · JPL
138614	2000 QO_{197}	—	August 29, 2000	Socorro	LINEAR	·	6.6 km	MPC · JPL
138615	2000 QY_{197}	—	August 29, 2000	Socorro	LINEAR	·	6.1 km	MPC · JPL
138616	2000 QZ_{204}	—	August 31, 2000	Socorro	LINEAR	(159)	4.2 km	MPC · JPL
138617	2000 QP_{205}	—	August 31, 2000	Socorro	LINEAR	LIX	6.4 km	MPC · JPL
138618	2000 QZ_{209}	—	August 31, 2000	Socorro	LINEAR	·	3.2 km	MPC · JPL
138619	2000 QL_{211}	—	August 31, 2000	Socorro	LINEAR	(3460)	5.9 km	MPC · JPL
138620	2000 QD_{220}	—	August 21, 2000	Anderson Mesa	LONEOS	·	4.3 km	MPC · JPL
138621	2000 QQ_{221}	—	August 21, 2000	Anderson Mesa	LONEOS	·	5.3 km	MPC · JPL
138622	2000 QU_{221}	—	August 21, 2000	Anderson Mesa	LONEOS	EMA	5.4 km	MPC · JPL
138623	2000 QQ_{225}	—	August 29, 2000	Socorro	LINEAR	·	4.1 km	MPC · JPL
138624	2000 QX_{226}	—	August 31, 2000	Socorro	LINEAR	·	4.5 km	MPC · JPL
138625	2000 QL_{244}	—	August 24, 2000	Socorro	LINEAR	·	3.8 km	MPC · JPL
138626 Tanguybertrand	2000 QM_{248}	Tanguybertrand	August 28, 2000	Cerro Tololo	M. W. Buie	·	3.2 km	MPC · JPL
138627	2000 QK_{250}	—	August 20, 2000	Anderson Mesa	LONEOS	·	4.4 km	MPC · JPL
138628	2000 QM_{251}	—	August 25, 2000	Cerro Tololo	M. W. Buie	other TNO	117 km	MPC · JPL
138629	2000 RR	—	September 1, 2000	Socorro	LINEAR	EUP	6.9 km	MPC · JPL
138630	2000 RU	—	September 1, 2000	Socorro	LINEAR	·	7.8 km	MPC · JPL
138631	2000 RE_{8}	—	September 1, 2000	Socorro	LINEAR	·	4.2 km	MPC · JPL
138632	2000 RS_{14}	—	September 1, 2000	Socorro	LINEAR	·	5.8 km	MPC · JPL
138633	2000 RD_{15}	—	September 1, 2000	Socorro	LINEAR	·	7.0 km	MPC · JPL
138634	2000 RW_{15}	—	September 1, 2000	Socorro	LINEAR	·	7.0 km	MPC · JPL
138635	2000 RP_{17}	—	September 1, 2000	Socorro	LINEAR	·	5.3 km	MPC · JPL
138636	2000 RJ_{18}	—	September 1, 2000	Socorro	LINEAR	·	6.6 km	MPC · JPL
138637	2000 RN_{20}	—	September 1, 2000	Socorro	LINEAR	·	8.2 km	MPC · JPL
138638	2000 RF_{24}	—	September 1, 2000	Socorro	LINEAR	·	5.7 km	MPC · JPL
138639	2000 RH_{24}	—	September 1, 2000	Socorro	LINEAR	TIR	4.8 km	MPC · JPL
138640	2000 RO_{26}	—	September 1, 2000	Socorro	LINEAR	·	7.8 km	MPC · JPL
138641	2000 RH_{27}	—	September 1, 2000	Socorro	LINEAR	·	4.2 km	MPC · JPL
138642	2000 RV_{27}	—	September 1, 2000	Socorro	LINEAR	·	3.5 km	MPC · JPL
138643	2000 RH_{29}	—	September 1, 2000	Socorro	LINEAR	·	5.6 km	MPC · JPL
138644	2000 RQ_{30}	—	September 1, 2000	Socorro	LINEAR	·	6.7 km	MPC · JPL
138645	2000 RQ_{31}	—	September 1, 2000	Socorro	LINEAR	·	5.5 km	MPC · JPL
138646	2000 RK_{34}	—	September 1, 2000	Socorro	LINEAR	·	3.5 km	MPC · JPL
138647	2000 RK_{39}	—	September 1, 2000	Socorro	LINEAR	·	6.2 km	MPC · JPL
138648	2000 RL_{39}	—	September 1, 2000	Socorro	LINEAR	·	5.1 km	MPC · JPL
138649	2000 RZ_{39}	—	September 3, 2000	Socorro	LINEAR	·	5.7 km	MPC · JPL
138650	2000 RY_{53}	—	September 1, 2000	Socorro	LINEAR	·	7.3 km	MPC · JPL
138651	2000 RQ_{59}	—	September 7, 2000	Kitt Peak	Spacewatch	·	5.2 km	MPC · JPL
138652	2000 RR_{63}	—	September 3, 2000	Socorro	LINEAR	·	8.4 km	MPC · JPL
138653	2000 RT_{76}	—	September 4, 2000	Socorro	LINEAR	·	6.8 km	MPC · JPL
138654	2000 RP_{77}	—	September 8, 2000	Ondřejov	L. Kotková	·	7.7 km	MPC · JPL
138655	2000 RG_{81}	—	September 1, 2000	Socorro	LINEAR	·	5.8 km	MPC · JPL
138656	2000 RQ_{81}	—	September 1, 2000	Socorro	LINEAR	·	6.1 km	MPC · JPL
138657	2000 RU_{81}	—	September 1, 2000	Socorro	LINEAR	·	8.9 km	MPC · JPL
138658	2000 RA_{84}	—	September 2, 2000	Socorro	LINEAR	EMA	5.7 km	MPC · JPL
138659	2000 RQ_{88}	—	September 3, 2000	Socorro	LINEAR	EOS	3.4 km	MPC · JPL
138660	2000 RR_{88}	—	September 3, 2000	Socorro	LINEAR	·	3.4 km	MPC · JPL
138661	2000 RH_{89}	—	September 3, 2000	Socorro	LINEAR	·	6.4 km	MPC · JPL
138662	2000 RV_{89}	—	September 3, 2000	Socorro	LINEAR	EOS ·	7.2 km	MPC · JPL
138663	2000 RE_{91}	—	September 3, 2000	Socorro	LINEAR	EOS	4.1 km	MPC · JPL
138664	2000 RK_{93}	—	September 4, 2000	Anderson Mesa	LONEOS	·	5.8 km	MPC · JPL
138665	2000 RE_{96}	—	September 4, 2000	Haleakala	NEAT	·	4.7 km	MPC · JPL
138666	2000 RX_{96}	—	September 5, 2000	Anderson Mesa	LONEOS	H	1.7 km	MPC · JPL
138667	2000 RZ_{99}	—	September 5, 2000	Anderson Mesa	LONEOS	·	5.6 km	MPC · JPL
138668	2000 RB_{103}	—	September 5, 2000	Anderson Mesa	LONEOS	LIX	6.7 km	MPC · JPL
138669	2000 RJ_{104}	—	September 6, 2000	Socorro	LINEAR	·	6.8 km	MPC · JPL
138670	2000 RH_{106}	—	September 3, 2000	Socorro	LINEAR	·	3.1 km	MPC · JPL
138671	2000 SY_{3}	—	September 20, 2000	Socorro	LINEAR	·	7.5 km	MPC · JPL
138672	2000 SL_{4}	—	September 22, 2000	Kitt Peak	Spacewatch	·	5.5 km	MPC · JPL
138673	2000 SH_{6}	—	September 20, 2000	Socorro	LINEAR	·	6.1 km	MPC · JPL
138674	2000 SJ_{6}	—	September 20, 2000	Socorro	LINEAR	·	8.6 km	MPC · JPL
138675	2000 SU_{8}	—	September 23, 2000	Prescott	P. G. Comba	·	1.0 km	MPC · JPL
138676	2000 SZ_{15}	—	September 23, 2000	Socorro	LINEAR	·	6.1 km	MPC · JPL
138677	2000 SU_{16}	—	September 23, 2000	Socorro	LINEAR	·	5.3 km	MPC · JPL
138678	2000 SS_{23}	—	September 26, 2000	Desert Beaver	W. K. Y. Yeung	·	2.3 km	MPC · JPL
138679	2000 SD_{30}	—	September 24, 2000	Socorro	LINEAR	KOR	2.5 km	MPC · JPL
138680	2000 SN_{31}	—	September 24, 2000	Socorro	LINEAR	·	4.9 km	MPC · JPL
138681	2000 SX_{32}	—	September 24, 2000	Socorro	LINEAR	·	5.7 km	MPC · JPL
138682	2000 SJ_{34}	—	September 24, 2000	Socorro	LINEAR	VER	5.1 km	MPC · JPL
138683	2000 SS_{35}	—	September 24, 2000	Socorro	LINEAR	·	3.9 km	MPC · JPL
138684	2000 SS_{40}	—	September 24, 2000	Socorro	LINEAR	·	5.0 km	MPC · JPL
138685	2000 SM_{45}	—	September 22, 2000	Socorro	LINEAR	·	6.4 km	MPC · JPL
138686	2000 SK_{50}	—	September 23, 2000	Socorro	LINEAR	·	5.3 km	MPC · JPL
138687	2000 SJ_{51}	—	September 23, 2000	Socorro	LINEAR	·	6.1 km	MPC · JPL
138688	2000 SE_{53}	—	September 24, 2000	Socorro	LINEAR	·	3.8 km	MPC · JPL
138689	2000 SW_{55}	—	September 24, 2000	Socorro	LINEAR	·	5.6 km	MPC · JPL
138690	2000 SY_{56}	—	September 24, 2000	Socorro	LINEAR	THM	3.1 km	MPC · JPL
138691	2000 SP_{57}	—	September 24, 2000	Socorro	LINEAR	slow	8.2 km	MPC · JPL
138692	2000 SV_{58}	—	September 24, 2000	Socorro	LINEAR	·	6.2 km	MPC · JPL
138693	2000 ST_{59}	—	September 24, 2000	Socorro	LINEAR	HYG	3.8 km	MPC · JPL
138694	2000 SV_{59}	—	September 24, 2000	Socorro	LINEAR	·	5.6 km	MPC · JPL
138695	2000 SD_{60}	—	September 24, 2000	Socorro	LINEAR	·	3.1 km	MPC · JPL
138696	2000 SB_{69}	—	September 24, 2000	Socorro	LINEAR	·	5.9 km	MPC · JPL
138697	2000 ST_{69}	—	September 24, 2000	Socorro	LINEAR	·	1.4 km	MPC · JPL
138698	2000 SQ_{76}	—	September 24, 2000	Socorro	LINEAR	·	2.3 km	MPC · JPL
138699	2000 SL_{77}	—	September 24, 2000	Socorro	LINEAR	CYB	4.7 km	MPC · JPL
138700	2000 SD_{79}	—	September 24, 2000	Socorro	LINEAR	·	3.8 km	MPC · JPL

== 138701–138800 ==
back to top

Designation			Discovery			Properties		Ref
Permanent	Provisional	Named after	Date	Site	Discoverer(s)	Category	Diam.	Ref
138701	2000 SJ_{80}	—	September 24, 2000	Socorro	LINEAR	·	3.7 km	MPC · JPL
138702	2000 SW_{85}	—	September 24, 2000	Socorro	LINEAR	·	2.3 km	MPC · JPL
138703	2000 SK_{89}	—	September 28, 2000	Socorro	LINEAR	·	6.9 km	MPC · JPL
138704	2000 SO_{90}	—	September 22, 2000	Socorro	LINEAR	·	6.2 km	MPC · JPL
138705	2000 SU_{90}	—	September 22, 2000	Socorro	LINEAR	(6355)	11 km	MPC · JPL
138706	2000 SR_{92}	—	September 23, 2000	Socorro	LINEAR	(43176) ·	6.0 km	MPC · JPL
138707	2000 SP_{95}	—	September 23, 2000	Socorro	LINEAR	·	6.2 km	MPC · JPL
138708	2000 SW_{95}	—	September 23, 2000	Socorro	LINEAR	·	6.1 km	MPC · JPL
138709	2000 SJ_{101}	—	September 24, 2000	Socorro	LINEAR	·	4.8 km	MPC · JPL
138710	2000 SE_{103}	—	September 24, 2000	Socorro	LINEAR	HYG	5.7 km	MPC · JPL
138711	2000 SN_{104}	—	September 24, 2000	Socorro	LINEAR	·	2.6 km	MPC · JPL
138712	2000 SJ_{105}	—	September 24, 2000	Socorro	LINEAR	·	3.3 km	MPC · JPL
138713	2000 SK_{117}	—	September 24, 2000	Socorro	LINEAR	NYS	2.0 km	MPC · JPL
138714	2000 SC_{126}	—	September 24, 2000	Socorro	LINEAR	HYG	4.6 km	MPC · JPL
138715	2000 SK_{129}	—	September 22, 2000	Socorro	LINEAR	·	7.8 km	MPC · JPL
138716	2000 SU_{130}	—	September 22, 2000	Socorro	LINEAR	THB	8.0 km	MPC · JPL
138717	2000 SB_{135}	—	September 23, 2000	Socorro	LINEAR	·	8.8 km	MPC · JPL
138718	2000 SW_{139}	—	September 23, 2000	Socorro	LINEAR	HYG	4.9 km	MPC · JPL
138719	2000 SB_{144}	—	September 24, 2000	Socorro	LINEAR	·	4.1 km	MPC · JPL
138720	2000 SV_{156}	—	September 25, 2000	Socorro	LINEAR	·	7.7 km	MPC · JPL
138721	2000 SY_{156}	—	September 26, 2000	Socorro	LINEAR	·	7.0 km	MPC · JPL
138722	2000 SA_{157}	—	September 26, 2000	Socorro	LINEAR	·	5.5 km	MPC · JPL
138723	2000 SY_{158}	—	September 27, 2000	Kitt Peak	Spacewatch	THM	3.6 km	MPC · JPL
138724	2000 SZ_{164}	—	September 23, 2000	Socorro	LINEAR	·	1.5 km	MPC · JPL
138725	2000 SF_{175}	—	September 28, 2000	Socorro	LINEAR	·	6.0 km	MPC · JPL
138726	2000 SY_{176}	—	September 28, 2000	Socorro	LINEAR	·	5.9 km	MPC · JPL
138727	2000 SU_{180}	—	September 27, 2000	Socorro	LINEAR	APO · PHA	480 m	MPC · JPL
138728	2000 SO_{186}	—	September 21, 2000	Haleakala	NEAT	EOS	3.9 km	MPC · JPL
138729	2000 SB_{187}	—	September 21, 2000	Haleakala	NEAT	·	7.8 km	MPC · JPL
138730	2000 SP_{187}	—	September 21, 2000	Haleakala	NEAT	·	5.3 km	MPC · JPL
138731	2000 SE_{191}	—	September 24, 2000	Socorro	LINEAR	·	4.7 km	MPC · JPL
138732	2000 SG_{191}	—	September 24, 2000	Socorro	LINEAR	EOS · fast	4.0 km	MPC · JPL
138733	2000 SB_{195}	—	September 24, 2000	Socorro	LINEAR	·	3.6 km	MPC · JPL
138734	2000 SG_{195}	—	September 24, 2000	Socorro	LINEAR	EOS	3.4 km	MPC · JPL
138735	2000 SR_{199}	—	September 24, 2000	Socorro	LINEAR	VER	4.8 km	MPC · JPL
138736	2000 SV_{199}	—	September 24, 2000	Socorro	LINEAR	THM	4.8 km	MPC · JPL
138737	2000 SX_{201}	—	September 24, 2000	Socorro	LINEAR	·	3.8 km	MPC · JPL
138738	2000 SZ_{203}	—	September 24, 2000	Socorro	LINEAR	·	5.0 km	MPC · JPL
138739	2000 SF_{206}	—	September 24, 2000	Socorro	LINEAR	2:1J	4.0 km	MPC · JPL
138740	2000 SB_{209}	—	September 25, 2000	Socorro	LINEAR	·	5.8 km	MPC · JPL
138741	2000 SE_{213}	—	September 25, 2000	Socorro	LINEAR	·	6.6 km	MPC · JPL
138742	2000 SR_{223}	—	September 27, 2000	Socorro	LINEAR	EUP	7.8 km	MPC · JPL
138743	2000 SC_{225}	—	September 27, 2000	Socorro	LINEAR	KOR	2.3 km	MPC · JPL
138744	2000 SB_{235}	—	September 24, 2000	Socorro	LINEAR	THM	3.7 km	MPC · JPL
138745	2000 SM_{235}	—	September 24, 2000	Socorro	LINEAR	·	3.2 km	MPC · JPL
138746	2000 SD_{246}	—	September 24, 2000	Socorro	LINEAR	VER	5.0 km	MPC · JPL
138747	2000 SR_{246}	—	September 24, 2000	Socorro	LINEAR	VER	8.0 km	MPC · JPL
138748	2000 SU_{246}	—	September 24, 2000	Socorro	LINEAR	·	8.1 km	MPC · JPL
138749	2000 SD_{253}	—	September 24, 2000	Socorro	LINEAR	HYG	10 km	MPC · JPL
138750	2000 SH_{253}	—	September 24, 2000	Socorro	LINEAR	·	4.0 km	MPC · JPL
138751	2000 SC_{259}	—	September 24, 2000	Socorro	LINEAR	VER	4.7 km	MPC · JPL
138752	2000 SP_{259}	—	September 24, 2000	Socorro	LINEAR	·	5.9 km	MPC · JPL
138753	2000 SP_{270}	—	September 27, 2000	Socorro	LINEAR	·	5.1 km	MPC · JPL
138754	2000 SA_{272}	—	September 28, 2000	Socorro	LINEAR	TIR	5.5 km	MPC · JPL
138755	2000 SL_{272}	—	September 28, 2000	Socorro	LINEAR	·	4.0 km	MPC · JPL
138756	2000 SC_{273}	—	September 28, 2000	Socorro	LINEAR	T_{j} (2.92)	3.5 km	MPC · JPL
138757	2000 SR_{280}	—	September 30, 2000	Socorro	LINEAR	·	6.9 km	MPC · JPL
138758	2000 SS_{280}	—	September 30, 2000	Socorro	LINEAR	VER	6.2 km	MPC · JPL
138759	2000 SK_{281}	—	September 23, 2000	Socorro	LINEAR	·	4.4 km	MPC · JPL
138760	2000 SO_{283}	—	September 23, 2000	Socorro	LINEAR	EOS	3.1 km	MPC · JPL
138761	2000 SN_{286}	—	September 26, 2000	Socorro	LINEAR	·	6.9 km	MPC · JPL
138762	2000 SR_{287}	—	September 26, 2000	Socorro	LINEAR	·	5.1 km	MPC · JPL
138763	2000 SX_{290}	—	September 27, 2000	Socorro	LINEAR	·	5.4 km	MPC · JPL
138764	2000 SP_{292}	—	September 27, 2000	Socorro	LINEAR	·	8.8 km	MPC · JPL
138765	2000 SD_{306}	—	September 30, 2000	Socorro	LINEAR	·	5.5 km	MPC · JPL
138766	2000 SL_{308}	—	September 30, 2000	Socorro	LINEAR	·	5.9 km	MPC · JPL
138767	2000 ST_{313}	—	September 27, 2000	Socorro	LINEAR	·	6.2 km	MPC · JPL
138768	2000 SM_{314}	—	September 28, 2000	Socorro	LINEAR	·	6.6 km	MPC · JPL
138769	2000 SP_{314}	—	September 28, 2000	Socorro	LINEAR	T_{j} (2.93)	7.0 km	MPC · JPL
138770	2000 SK_{315}	—	September 28, 2000	Socorro	LINEAR	·	6.2 km	MPC · JPL
138771	2000 SP_{316}	—	September 30, 2000	Socorro	LINEAR	TIR ·	7.0 km	MPC · JPL
138772	2000 SH_{317}	—	September 30, 2000	Socorro	LINEAR	·	6.5 km	MPC · JPL
138773	2000 SS_{318}	—	September 26, 2000	Socorro	LINEAR	·	10 km	MPC · JPL
138774	2000 SJ_{320}	—	September 29, 2000	Kitt Peak	Spacewatch	EOS	3.3 km	MPC · JPL
138775	2000 SA_{328}	—	September 30, 2000	Socorro	LINEAR	·	10 km	MPC · JPL
138776	2000 SH_{328}	—	September 30, 2000	Kitt Peak	Spacewatch	·	3.6 km	MPC · JPL
138777	2000 SX_{330}	—	September 27, 2000	Kitt Peak	Spacewatch	·	4.7 km	MPC · JPL
138778	2000 ST_{334}	—	September 26, 2000	Kitt Peak	Spacewatch	·	5.4 km	MPC · JPL
138779	2000 SL_{335}	—	September 26, 2000	Kitt Peak	Spacewatch	·	3.8 km	MPC · JPL
138780	2000 SR_{338}	—	September 25, 2000	Haleakala	NEAT	·	5.6 km	MPC · JPL
138781	2000 SH_{339}	—	September 25, 2000	Socorro	LINEAR	CYB	8.4 km	MPC · JPL
138782	2000 SV_{344}	—	September 20, 2000	Socorro	LINEAR	·	5.6 km	MPC · JPL
138783	2000 SJ_{349}	—	September 30, 2000	Anderson Mesa	LONEOS	·	7.9 km	MPC · JPL
138784	2000 SN_{350}	—	September 29, 2000	Anderson Mesa	LONEOS	·	5.4 km	MPC · JPL
138785	2000 SA_{351}	—	September 29, 2000	Anderson Mesa	LONEOS	·	6.9 km	MPC · JPL
138786	2000 SL_{355}	—	September 29, 2000	Anderson Mesa	LONEOS	·	4.1 km	MPC · JPL
138787	2000 SJ_{358}	—	September 23, 2000	Socorro	LINEAR	·	11 km	MPC · JPL
138788	2000 SQ_{359}	—	September 26, 2000	Anderson Mesa	LONEOS	·	6.4 km	MPC · JPL
138789	2000 SU_{362}	—	September 20, 2000	Socorro	LINEAR	·	4.7 km	MPC · JPL
138790	2000 SZ_{362}	—	September 19, 2000	Kitt Peak	Spacewatch	AGN	1.9 km	MPC · JPL
138791	2000 SK_{363}	—	September 21, 2000	Anderson Mesa	LONEOS	LIX	5.2 km	MPC · JPL
138792	2000 SP_{365}	—	September 21, 2000	Anderson Mesa	LONEOS	·	5.1 km	MPC · JPL
138793	2000 SV_{368}	—	September 25, 2000	Anderson Mesa	LONEOS	·	2.6 km	MPC · JPL
138794	2000 TU_{2}	—	October 1, 2000	Socorro	LINEAR	·	5.3 km	MPC · JPL
138795	2000 TB_{4}	—	October 1, 2000	Socorro	LINEAR	·	3.5 km	MPC · JPL
138796	2000 TV_{6}	—	October 1, 2000	Socorro	LINEAR	KOR	2.0 km	MPC · JPL
138797	2000 TR_{9}	—	October 1, 2000	Socorro	LINEAR	VER	5.4 km	MPC · JPL
138798	2000 TA_{13}	—	October 1, 2000	Socorro	LINEAR	·	7.5 km	MPC · JPL
138799	2000 TT_{15}	—	October 1, 2000	Socorro	LINEAR	·	5.2 km	MPC · JPL
138800	2000 TZ_{19}	—	October 1, 2000	Socorro	LINEAR	EOS	4.5 km	MPC · JPL

== 138801–138900 ==
back to top

Designation			Discovery			Properties		Ref
Permanent	Provisional	Named after	Date	Site	Discoverer(s)	Category	Diam.	Ref
138801	2000 TJ_{26}	—	October 1, 2000	Socorro	LINEAR	MAS	1.1 km	MPC · JPL
138802	2000 TL_{27}	—	October 3, 2000	Socorro	LINEAR	·	8.3 km	MPC · JPL
138803	2000 TT_{34}	—	October 6, 2000	Anderson Mesa	LONEOS	·	4.4 km	MPC · JPL
138804	2000 TG_{36}	—	October 6, 2000	Anderson Mesa	LONEOS	·	6.6 km	MPC · JPL
138805	2000 TE_{39}	—	October 1, 2000	Socorro	LINEAR	EUP	8.5 km	MPC · JPL
138806	2000 TK_{39}	—	October 1, 2000	Socorro	LINEAR	·	5.0 km	MPC · JPL
138807	2000 TA_{43}	—	October 1, 2000	Socorro	LINEAR	·	5.5 km	MPC · JPL
138808	2000 TD_{43}	—	October 1, 2000	Socorro	LINEAR	·	5.1 km	MPC · JPL
138809	2000 TF_{43}	—	October 1, 2000	Socorro	LINEAR	LUT	8.1 km	MPC · JPL
138810	2000 TB_{50}	—	October 1, 2000	Anderson Mesa	LONEOS	·	6.5 km	MPC · JPL
138811	2000 TW_{50}	—	October 1, 2000	Socorro	LINEAR	THB	9.4 km	MPC · JPL
138812	2000 TY_{54}	—	October 1, 2000	Socorro	LINEAR	·	3.8 km	MPC · JPL
138813	2000 TO_{56}	—	October 2, 2000	Anderson Mesa	LONEOS	EOS	3.1 km	MPC · JPL
138814	2000 TD_{58}	—	October 2, 2000	Socorro	LINEAR	·	3.9 km	MPC · JPL
138815	2000 TQ_{64}	—	October 7, 2000	Kitt Peak	Spacewatch	AMO +1km	880 m	MPC · JPL
138816	2000 TG_{65}	—	October 1, 2000	Socorro	LINEAR	CYB	5.2 km	MPC · JPL
138817	2000 UR_{8}	—	October 24, 2000	Socorro	LINEAR	·	6.6 km	MPC · JPL
138818	2000 UK_{15}	—	October 29, 2000	Oaxaca	Roe, J. M.	·	3.5 km	MPC · JPL
138819	2000 UL_{22}	—	October 24, 2000	Socorro	LINEAR	URS	7.7 km	MPC · JPL
138820	2000 UN_{22}	—	October 24, 2000	Socorro	LINEAR	·	5.3 km	MPC · JPL
138821	2000 UM_{23}	—	October 24, 2000	Socorro	LINEAR	HYG	4.6 km	MPC · JPL
138822	2000 UR_{23}	—	October 24, 2000	Socorro	LINEAR	LIX	6.3 km	MPC · JPL
138823	2000 UR_{24}	—	October 24, 2000	Socorro	LINEAR	·	9.8 km	MPC · JPL
138824	2000 UK_{28}	—	October 25, 2000	Socorro	LINEAR	·	3.6 km	MPC · JPL
138825	2000 UR_{31}	—	October 29, 2000	Kitt Peak	Spacewatch	·	3.0 km	MPC · JPL
138826	2000 UY_{42}	—	October 24, 2000	Socorro	LINEAR	LUT	6.4 km	MPC · JPL
138827	2000 UB_{44}	—	October 24, 2000	Socorro	LINEAR	·	2.4 km	MPC · JPL
138828	2000 UD_{52}	—	October 24, 2000	Socorro	LINEAR	·	6.6 km	MPC · JPL
138829	2000 UL_{58}	—	October 25, 2000	Socorro	LINEAR	·	5.2 km	MPC · JPL
138830	2000 UJ_{62}	—	October 25, 2000	Socorro	LINEAR	THB	4.6 km	MPC · JPL
138831	2000 UD_{68}	—	October 25, 2000	Socorro	LINEAR	·	9.0 km	MPC · JPL
138832	2000 UX_{88}	—	October 31, 2000	Socorro	LINEAR	·	4.7 km	MPC · JPL
138833	2000 UE_{91}	—	October 25, 2000	Socorro	LINEAR	·	6.9 km	MPC · JPL
138834	2000 UQ_{92}	—	October 25, 2000	Socorro	LINEAR	·	5.8 km	MPC · JPL
138835	2000 UZ_{97}	—	October 25, 2000	Socorro	LINEAR	·	3.8 km	MPC · JPL
138836	2000 UW_{100}	—	October 25, 2000	Socorro	LINEAR	·	6.5 km	MPC · JPL
138837	2000 UC_{109}	—	October 31, 2000	Socorro	LINEAR	·	3.4 km	MPC · JPL
138838	2000 VL_{3}	—	November 1, 2000	Desert Beaver	W. K. Y. Yeung	·	2.3 km	MPC · JPL
138839	2000 VA_{10}	—	November 1, 2000	Socorro	LINEAR	THM	5.4 km	MPC · JPL
138840	2000 VB_{10}	—	November 1, 2000	Socorro	LINEAR	·	6.8 km	MPC · JPL
138841	2000 VT_{15}	—	November 1, 2000	Socorro	LINEAR	·	3.6 km	MPC · JPL
138842	2000 VN_{22}	—	November 1, 2000	Socorro	LINEAR	·	6.6 km	MPC · JPL
138843	2000 VF_{39}	—	November 2, 2000	Socorro	LINEAR	·	630 m	MPC · JPL
138844	2000 VC_{41}	—	November 1, 2000	Socorro	LINEAR	·	6.8 km	MPC · JPL
138845	2000 VV_{57}	—	November 3, 2000	Socorro	LINEAR	·	4.5 km	MPC · JPL
138846	2000 VJ_{61}	—	November 2, 2000	Socorro	LINEAR	APO +1km	2.2 km	MPC · JPL
138847	2000 VE_{62}	—	November 3, 2000	Socorro	LINEAR	AMO +1km	960 m	MPC · JPL
138848	2000 WD_{1}	—	November 16, 2000	Kitt Peak	Spacewatch	fast	980 m	MPC · JPL
138849	2000 WL_{3}	—	November 17, 2000	Socorro	LINEAR	T_{j} (2.95)	10 km	MPC · JPL
138850	2000 WR_{6}	—	November 19, 2000	Socorro	LINEAR	·	1.3 km	MPC · JPL
138851	2000 WW_{7}	—	November 20, 2000	Socorro	LINEAR	LIX	7.2 km	MPC · JPL
138852	2000 WN_{10}	—	November 20, 2000	Socorro	LINEAR	APO	310 m	MPC · JPL
138853	2000 WN_{13}	—	November 21, 2000	Socorro	LINEAR	·	1.7 km	MPC · JPL
138854	2000 WK_{17}	—	November 21, 2000	Socorro	LINEAR	(11097) · CYB	4.6 km	MPC · JPL
138855	2000 WU_{28}	—	November 21, 2000	Socorro	LINEAR	·	1.5 km	MPC · JPL
138856	2000 WT_{34}	—	November 20, 2000	Socorro	LINEAR	·	2.1 km	MPC · JPL
138857	2000 WC_{47}	—	November 21, 2000	Socorro	LINEAR	(2076)	1.6 km	MPC · JPL
138858	2000 WE_{62}	—	November 26, 2000	Socorro	LINEAR	·	8.2 km	MPC · JPL
138859	2000 WN_{63}	—	November 27, 2000	Kitt Peak	Spacewatch	APO	570 m	MPC · JPL
138860	2000 WO_{77}	—	November 20, 2000	Socorro	LINEAR	·	6.0 km	MPC · JPL
138861	2000 WO_{87}	—	November 20, 2000	Socorro	LINEAR	·	1.8 km	MPC · JPL
138862	2000 WP_{113}	—	November 20, 2000	Socorro	LINEAR	·	3.7 km	MPC · JPL
138863	2000 WO_{119}	—	November 20, 2000	Socorro	LINEAR	EUP	6.9 km	MPC · JPL
138864	2000 WM_{143}	—	November 20, 2000	Socorro	LINEAR	T_{j} (2.97)	8.1 km	MPC · JPL
138865	2000 WP_{159}	—	November 20, 2000	Anderson Mesa	LONEOS	LUT	7.9 km	MPC · JPL
138866	2000 WO_{163}	—	November 21, 2000	Socorro	LINEAR	·	4.1 km	MPC · JPL
138867	2000 XD_{5}	—	December 1, 2000	Socorro	LINEAR	CYB	9.1 km	MPC · JPL
138868	2000 XR_{15}	—	December 5, 2000	Socorro	LINEAR	·	1.1 km	MPC · JPL
138869	2000 XL_{16}	—	December 1, 2000	Socorro	LINEAR	EOS	2.9 km	MPC · JPL
138870	2000 XP_{16}	—	December 1, 2000	Socorro	LINEAR	·	6.5 km	MPC · JPL
138871	2000 XG_{17}	—	December 1, 2000	Socorro	LINEAR	·	8.9 km	MPC · JPL
138872	2000 XU_{31}	—	December 4, 2000	Socorro	LINEAR	·	3.4 km	MPC · JPL
138873	2000 XV_{34}	—	December 4, 2000	Socorro	LINEAR	·	3.7 km	MPC · JPL
138874	2000 XN_{35}	—	December 4, 2000	Socorro	LINEAR	·	7.0 km	MPC · JPL
138875	2000 XF_{37}	—	December 5, 2000	Socorro	LINEAR	URS	6.0 km	MPC · JPL
138876	2000 XA_{45}	—	December 5, 2000	Socorro	LINEAR	·	9.7 km	MPC · JPL
138877	2000 XG_{47}	—	December 15, 2000	Socorro	LINEAR	APO +1km	1.6 km	MPC · JPL
138878	2000 YE_{1}	—	December 18, 2000	Kitt Peak	Spacewatch	·	6.5 km	MPC · JPL
138879	2000 YQ_{2}	—	December 19, 2000	Socorro	LINEAR	·	1.5 km	MPC · JPL
138880	2000 YK_{6}	—	December 20, 2000	Socorro	LINEAR	·	1.2 km	MPC · JPL
138881	2000 YD_{9}	—	December 21, 2000	Kitt Peak	Spacewatch	·	2.3 km	MPC · JPL
138882	2000 YZ_{9}	—	December 20, 2000	Socorro	LINEAR	·	1.2 km	MPC · JPL
138883	2000 YL_{29}	—	December 26, 2000	Haleakala	NEAT	AMO · APO +1km	1.2 km	MPC · JPL
138884	2000 YQ_{37}	—	December 30, 2000	Socorro	LINEAR	·	1.5 km	MPC · JPL
138885	2000 YR_{41}	—	December 30, 2000	Socorro	LINEAR	·	3.6 km	MPC · JPL
138886	2000 YJ_{46}	—	December 30, 2000	Socorro	LINEAR	·	1.9 km	MPC · JPL
138887	2000 YE_{50}	—	December 30, 2000	Socorro	LINEAR	·	1.3 km	MPC · JPL
138888	2000 YQ_{52}	—	December 30, 2000	Socorro	LINEAR	·	2.2 km	MPC · JPL
138889	2000 YY_{55}	—	December 30, 2000	Socorro	LINEAR	·	1.2 km	MPC · JPL
138890	2000 YD_{61}	—	December 30, 2000	Socorro	LINEAR	·	5.9 km	MPC · JPL
138891	2000 YY_{61}	—	December 30, 2000	Socorro	LINEAR	·	1.5 km	MPC · JPL
138892	2000 YM_{64}	—	December 30, 2000	Socorro	LINEAR	·	1.3 km	MPC · JPL
138893	2000 YH_{66}	—	December 30, 2000	Socorro	LINEAR	APO +1km	810 m	MPC · JPL
138894	2000 YW_{67}	—	December 28, 2000	Socorro	LINEAR	·	1.7 km	MPC · JPL
138895	2000 YL_{74}	—	December 30, 2000	Socorro	LINEAR	·	3.5 km	MPC · JPL
138896	2000 YN_{74}	—	December 30, 2000	Socorro	LINEAR	·	1.5 km	MPC · JPL
138897	2000 YV_{77}	—	December 30, 2000	Socorro	LINEAR	·	1.4 km	MPC · JPL
138898	2000 YU_{87}	—	December 30, 2000	Socorro	LINEAR	·	8.0 km	MPC · JPL
138899	2000 YD_{95}	—	December 30, 2000	Socorro	LINEAR	·	5.6 km	MPC · JPL
138900	2000 YW_{97}	—	December 30, 2000	Socorro	LINEAR	·	1.4 km	MPC · JPL

== 138901–139000 ==
back to top

Designation			Discovery			Properties		Ref
Permanent	Provisional	Named after	Date	Site	Discoverer(s)	Category	Diam.	Ref
138901	2000 YU_{98}	—	December 30, 2000	Socorro	LINEAR	·	2.2 km	MPC · JPL
138902	2000 YO_{102}	—	December 28, 2000	Socorro	LINEAR	·	1.4 km	MPC · JPL
138903	2000 YA_{107}	—	December 30, 2000	Socorro	LINEAR	THM	4.3 km	MPC · JPL
138904	2000 YO_{108}	—	December 30, 2000	Socorro	LINEAR	HYG	4.8 km	MPC · JPL
138905	2000 YK_{110}	—	December 30, 2000	Socorro	LINEAR	·	1.1 km	MPC · JPL
138906	2000 YO_{118}	—	December 30, 2000	Socorro	LINEAR	·	1.4 km	MPC · JPL
138907	2000 YB_{129}	—	December 29, 2000	Haleakala	NEAT	·	1.5 km	MPC · JPL
138908	2000 YG_{130}	—	December 30, 2000	Socorro	LINEAR	HYG	6.4 km	MPC · JPL
138909	2000 YO_{135}	—	December 18, 2000	Anderson Mesa	LONEOS	·	1.6 km	MPC · JPL
138910	2000 YE_{136}	—	December 22, 2000	Kitt Peak	Spacewatch	·	1.5 km	MPC · JPL
138911	2001 AE_{2}	—	January 2, 2001	Socorro	LINEAR	AMO	460 m	MPC · JPL
138912	2001 AD_{4}	—	January 2, 2001	Socorro	LINEAR	·	6.2 km	MPC · JPL
138913	2001 AJ_{11}	—	January 2, 2001	Socorro	LINEAR	slow	1.6 km	MPC · JPL
138914	2001 AB_{12}	—	January 2, 2001	Socorro	LINEAR	·	2.0 km	MPC · JPL
138915	2001 AW_{13}	—	January 2, 2001	Socorro	LINEAR	·	1.4 km	MPC · JPL
138916	2001 AS_{14}	—	January 2, 2001	Socorro	LINEAR	·	1.1 km	MPC · JPL
138917	2001 AZ_{19}	—	January 4, 2001	Socorro	LINEAR	·	1.1 km	MPC · JPL
138918	2001 AJ_{22}	—	January 3, 2001	Socorro	LINEAR	·	1.3 km	MPC · JPL
138919	2001 AU_{23}	—	January 3, 2001	Socorro	LINEAR	·	2.7 km	MPC · JPL
138920	2001 AE_{24}	—	January 15, 2001	Kitt Peak	Spacewatch	·	1.1 km	MPC · JPL
138921	2001 AR_{24}	—	January 4, 2001	Socorro	LINEAR	·	1.3 km	MPC · JPL
138922	2001 AY_{39}	—	January 3, 2001	Anderson Mesa	LONEOS	·	1.4 km	MPC · JPL
138923	2001 AS_{40}	—	January 3, 2001	Anderson Mesa	LONEOS	·	5.3 km	MPC · JPL
138924	2001 AV_{40}	—	January 3, 2001	Anderson Mesa	LONEOS	·	1.6 km	MPC · JPL
138925	2001 AU_{43}	—	January 4, 2001	Socorro	LINEAR	AMO +1km	2.3 km	MPC · JPL
138926	2001 BA	—	January 16, 2001	Oizumi	T. Kobayashi	·	1.8 km	MPC · JPL
138927	2001 BR	—	January 17, 2001	Oizumi	T. Kobayashi	·	1.4 km	MPC · JPL
138928	2001 BP_{1}	—	January 16, 2001	Kitt Peak	Spacewatch	·	830 m	MPC · JPL
138929	2001 BU_{1}	—	January 16, 2001	Bergisch Gladbach	W. Bickel	·	1.3 km	MPC · JPL
138930	2001 BQ_{3}	—	January 18, 2001	Socorro	LINEAR	·	1.0 km	MPC · JPL
138931	2001 BJ_{4}	—	January 18, 2001	Socorro	LINEAR	·	2.8 km	MPC · JPL
138932	2001 BB_{8}	—	January 19, 2001	Socorro	LINEAR	·	7.3 km	MPC · JPL
138933	2001 BT_{8}	—	January 19, 2001	Socorro	LINEAR	·	5.8 km	MPC · JPL
138934	2001 BW_{8}	—	January 19, 2001	Socorro	LINEAR	·	1.2 km	MPC · JPL
138935	2001 BH_{12}	—	January 20, 2001	Kitt Peak	Spacewatch	MRX	1.7 km	MPC · JPL
138936	2001 BK_{13}	—	January 21, 2001	Socorro	LINEAR	·	1.1 km	MPC · JPL
138937	2001 BK_{16}	—	January 19, 2001	Socorro	LINEAR	APO +1km	980 m	MPC · JPL
138938	2001 BJ_{18}	—	January 19, 2001	Socorro	LINEAR	·	1.5 km	MPC · JPL
138939	2001 BE_{20}	—	January 19, 2001	Socorro	LINEAR	·	1.2 km	MPC · JPL
138940	2001 BO_{23}	—	January 20, 2001	Socorro	LINEAR	·	1.7 km	MPC · JPL
138941	2001 BU_{28}	—	January 20, 2001	Socorro	LINEAR	·	1.9 km	MPC · JPL
138942	2001 BP_{29}	—	January 20, 2001	Socorro	LINEAR	·	7.2 km	MPC · JPL
138943	2001 BT_{30}	—	January 20, 2001	Socorro	LINEAR	·	2.3 km	MPC · JPL
138944	2001 BF_{31}	—	January 20, 2001	Socorro	LINEAR	·	3.0 km	MPC · JPL
138945	2001 BZ_{37}	—	January 21, 2001	Socorro	LINEAR	·	2.1 km	MPC · JPL
138946	2001 BA_{39}	—	January 19, 2001	Kitt Peak	Spacewatch	·	990 m	MPC · JPL
138947	2001 BA_{40}	—	January 23, 2001	Haleakala	NEAT	APO	450 m	MPC · JPL
138948	2001 BR_{47}	—	January 21, 2001	Socorro	LINEAR	V	1.2 km	MPC · JPL
138949	2001 BS_{58}	—	January 21, 2001	Socorro	LINEAR	·	1.8 km	MPC · JPL
138950	2001 BR_{61}	—	January 31, 2001	Desert Beaver	W. K. Y. Yeung	·	2.3 km	MPC · JPL
138951	2001 BV_{62}	—	January 29, 2001	Socorro	LINEAR	·	1.3 km	MPC · JPL
138952	2001 BP_{63}	—	January 29, 2001	Socorro	LINEAR	·	1.3 km	MPC · JPL
138953	2001 BW_{68}	—	January 31, 2001	Socorro	LINEAR	·	1.4 km	MPC · JPL
138954	2001 BD_{73}	—	January 28, 2001	Haleakala	NEAT	·	1.3 km	MPC · JPL
138955	2001 BX_{73}	—	January 29, 2001	Kvistaberg	Uppsala-DLR Asteroid Survey	·	1 km	MPC · JPL
138956	2001 BK_{78}	—	January 24, 2001	Socorro	LINEAR	·	1.2 km	MPC · JPL
138957	2001 BT_{79}	—	January 21, 2001	Socorro	LINEAR	·	1.3 km	MPC · JPL
138958	2001 BZ_{79}	—	January 21, 2001	Socorro	LINEAR	·	1.3 km	MPC · JPL
138959	2001 CZ_{2}	—	February 1, 2001	Socorro	LINEAR	·	1.6 km	MPC · JPL
138960	2001 CQ_{3}	—	February 1, 2001	Socorro	LINEAR	·	1.3 km	MPC · JPL
138961	2001 CJ_{5}	—	February 1, 2001	Socorro	LINEAR	·	1.5 km	MPC · JPL
138962	2001 CP_{7}	—	February 1, 2001	Socorro	LINEAR	·	1.7 km	MPC · JPL
138963	2001 CA_{9}	—	February 1, 2001	Socorro	LINEAR	·	1.2 km	MPC · JPL
138964	2001 CL_{9}	—	February 1, 2001	Socorro	LINEAR	·	3.5 km	MPC · JPL
138965	2001 CD_{17}	—	February 1, 2001	Socorro	LINEAR	·	2.7 km	MPC · JPL
138966	2001 CS_{17}	—	February 1, 2001	Socorro	LINEAR	·	1.5 km	MPC · JPL
138967	2001 CN_{18}	—	February 2, 2001	Socorro	LINEAR	·	1.4 km	MPC · JPL
138968	2001 CT_{18}	—	February 2, 2001	Socorro	LINEAR	THM	4.6 km	MPC · JPL
138969	2001 CZ_{18}	—	February 2, 2001	Socorro	LINEAR	·	1.2 km	MPC · JPL
138970	2001 CV_{19}	—	February 2, 2001	Socorro	LINEAR	·	1.4 km	MPC · JPL
138971	2001 CB_{21}	—	February 2, 2001	Socorro	LINEAR	APO · PHA	700 m	MPC · JPL
138972	2001 CO_{21}	—	February 1, 2001	Anderson Mesa	LONEOS	·	1.7 km	MPC · JPL
138973	2001 CZ_{22}	—	February 1, 2001	Anderson Mesa	LONEOS	·	3.2 km	MPC · JPL
138974	2001 CX_{24}	—	February 1, 2001	Socorro	LINEAR	·	1.6 km	MPC · JPL
138975	2001 CT_{25}	—	February 1, 2001	Socorro	LINEAR	·	1.4 km	MPC · JPL
138976	2001 CJ_{26}	—	February 1, 2001	Socorro	LINEAR	(2076)	1.6 km	MPC · JPL
138977	2001 CY_{31}	—	February 5, 2001	Socorro	LINEAR	·	940 m	MPC · JPL
138978	2001 CD_{32}	—	February 12, 2001	Socorro	LINEAR	·	4.7 km	MPC · JPL
138979 Černice	2001 CM_{32}	Černice	February 14, 2001	Kleť	M. Tichý	·	1.2 km	MPC · JPL
138980	2001 CY_{36}	—	February 14, 2001	Ondřejov	L. Kotková	·	960 m	MPC · JPL
138981	2001 CE_{47}	—	February 13, 2001	Kitt Peak	Spacewatch	L4	11 km	MPC · JPL
138982	2001 CS_{49}	—	February 2, 2001	Haleakala	NEAT	·	2.5 km	MPC · JPL
138983	2001 DX_{4}	—	February 16, 2001	Socorro	LINEAR	(2076)	1.6 km	MPC · JPL
138984	2001 DY_{6}	—	February 16, 2001	Črni Vrh	Matičič, S.	·	1.1 km	MPC · JPL
138985	2001 DP_{7}	—	February 16, 2001	Oizumi	T. Kobayashi	·	1.8 km	MPC · JPL
138986	2001 DB_{12}	—	February 17, 2001	Socorro	LINEAR	·	2.0 km	MPC · JPL
138987	2001 DN_{12}	—	February 17, 2001	Socorro	LINEAR	PHO	1.3 km	MPC · JPL
138988	2001 DQ_{12}	—	February 17, 2001	Socorro	LINEAR	·	1.7 km	MPC · JPL
138989	2001 DK_{14}	—	February 19, 2001	Socorro	LINEAR	·	1.3 km	MPC · JPL
138990	2001 DV_{14}	—	February 16, 2001	Črni Vrh	Matičič, S.	·	3.9 km	MPC · JPL
138991	2001 DF_{16}	—	February 16, 2001	Socorro	LINEAR	·	1.9 km	MPC · JPL
138992	2001 DS_{16}	—	February 16, 2001	Socorro	LINEAR	(2076)	1.4 km	MPC · JPL
138993	2001 DQ_{19}	—	February 16, 2001	Socorro	LINEAR	·	1.9 km	MPC · JPL
138994	2001 DY_{20}	—	February 16, 2001	Socorro	LINEAR	·	1.6 km	MPC · JPL
138995	2001 DR_{22}	—	February 17, 2001	Socorro	LINEAR	·	1.1 km	MPC · JPL
138996	2001 DT_{22}	—	February 17, 2001	Socorro	LINEAR	·	1.3 km	MPC · JPL
138997	2001 DA_{24}	—	February 17, 2001	Socorro	LINEAR	·	1.6 km	MPC · JPL
138998	2001 DX_{26}	—	February 17, 2001	Socorro	LINEAR	·	1.0 km	MPC · JPL
138999	2001 DU_{27}	—	February 17, 2001	Socorro	LINEAR	·	1.8 km	MPC · JPL
139000	2001 DA_{28}	—	February 17, 2001	Socorro	LINEAR	·	1.4 km	MPC · JPL

back to top

== See also ==
- Meanings of minor-planet names: 138001–139000
