= List of minor planets: 139001–140000 =

The following is a partial list of minor planets, running from minor-planet number 139001 through 140000, inclusive. The primary data for this and other partial lists is based on JPL's "Small-Body Orbital Elements" and data available from the Minor Planet Center. Critical list information is also provided by the MPC, unless otherwise specified from Lowell Observatory. A detailed description of the table's columns and additional sources are given on the main page including a complete list of every page in this series, and a statistical break-up on the dynamical classification of minor planets.

Also see the summary list of all named bodies in numerical and alphabetical order, and the corresponding naming citations for the number range of this particular list. New namings may only be added to this list after official publication, as the preannouncement of names is condemned by the Working Group for Small Bodies Nomenclature of the International Astronomical Union.

Near-Earth obj.	MBA (inner)	MBA (outer)	Centaur
Mars-crosser	MBA (middle)	Jupiter trojan	Trans-Neptunian obj.
Unclassified

== 139001–139100 ==
Designation			Discovery			Properties		Ref
Permanent	Provisional	Named after	Date	Site	Discoverer(s)	Category	Diam.	Ref
139001	2001 DS_{30}	—	February 17, 2001	Socorro	LINEAR	·	1.5 km	MPC · JPL
139002	2001 DL_{31}	—	February 17, 2001	Socorro	LINEAR	·	2.0 km	MPC · JPL
139003	2001 DE_{34}	—	February 17, 2001	Socorro	LINEAR	·	2.5 km	MPC · JPL
139004	2001 DN_{35}	—	February 19, 2001	Socorro	LINEAR	V	1.1 km	MPC · JPL
139005	2001 DF_{36}	—	February 19, 2001	Socorro	LINEAR	V	1.1 km	MPC · JPL
139006	2001 DF_{37}	—	February 19, 2001	Socorro	LINEAR	·	1.6 km	MPC · JPL
139007	2001 DD_{41}	—	February 19, 2001	Socorro	LINEAR	·	1.6 km	MPC · JPL
139008	2001 DZ_{41}	—	February 19, 2001	Socorro	LINEAR	·	2.4 km	MPC · JPL
139009	2001 DH_{42}	—	February 19, 2001	Socorro	LINEAR	L4	14 km	MPC · JPL
139010	2001 DA_{45}	—	February 19, 2001	Socorro	LINEAR	·	1.5 km	MPC · JPL
139011	2001 DC_{45}	—	February 19, 2001	Socorro	LINEAR	·	1.8 km	MPC · JPL
139012	2001 DH_{45}	—	February 19, 2001	Socorro	LINEAR	·	3.0 km	MPC · JPL
139013	2001 DD_{46}	—	February 19, 2001	Socorro	LINEAR	NYS	1.8 km	MPC · JPL
139014	2001 DG_{46}	—	February 19, 2001	Socorro	LINEAR	·	1.3 km	MPC · JPL
139015	2001 DR_{57}	—	February 17, 2001	Kitt Peak	Spacewatch	NYS	1.7 km	MPC · JPL
139016	2001 DU_{58}	—	February 19, 2001	Socorro	LINEAR	·	1.8 km	MPC · JPL
139017	2001 DQ_{59}	—	February 17, 2001	Socorro	LINEAR	V	1.4 km	MPC · JPL
139018	2001 DF_{60}	—	February 19, 2001	Socorro	LINEAR	·	1.6 km	MPC · JPL
139019	2001 DK_{61}	—	February 19, 2001	Socorro	LINEAR	·	1.4 km	MPC · JPL
139020	2001 DD_{64}	—	February 19, 2001	Socorro	LINEAR	·	2.0 km	MPC · JPL
139021	2001 DE_{64}	—	February 19, 2001	Socorro	LINEAR	·	2.2 km	MPC · JPL
139022	2001 DL_{64}	—	February 19, 2001	Socorro	LINEAR	·	2.5 km	MPC · JPL
139023	2001 DU_{65}	—	February 19, 2001	Socorro	LINEAR	·	1.5 km	MPC · JPL
139024	2001 DF_{71}	—	February 19, 2001	Socorro	LINEAR	·	1.1 km	MPC · JPL
139025	2001 DR_{71}	—	February 19, 2001	Socorro	LINEAR	·	2.1 km	MPC · JPL
139026	2001 DB_{75}	—	February 20, 2001	Socorro	LINEAR	·	1.5 km	MPC · JPL
139027	2001 DS_{83}	—	February 23, 2001	Kitt Peak	Spacewatch	·	1.8 km	MPC · JPL
139028 Haynald	2001 DL_{89}	Haynald	February 28, 2001	Piszkéstető	K. Sárneczky, Derekas, A.	·	1.2 km	MPC · JPL
139029	2001 DO_{91}	—	February 20, 2001	Kitt Peak	Spacewatch	·	2.8 km	MPC · JPL
139030	2001 DE_{98}	—	February 17, 2001	Socorro	LINEAR	·	1.0 km	MPC · JPL
139031	2001 DL_{102}	—	February 16, 2001	Socorro	LINEAR	·	1.6 km	MPC · JPL
139032	2001 DY_{102}	—	February 16, 2001	Socorro	LINEAR	·	1.5 km	MPC · JPL
139033	2001 DO_{103}	—	February 16, 2001	Haleakala	NEAT	(1338) (FLO)	980 m	MPC · JPL
139034	2001 DZ_{103}	—	February 16, 2001	Anderson Mesa	LONEOS	·	2.3 km	MPC · JPL
139035	2001 DF_{105}	—	February 16, 2001	Anderson Mesa	LONEOS	VER	5.5 km	MPC · JPL
139036	2001 DG_{105}	—	February 16, 2001	Anderson Mesa	LONEOS	·	1.7 km	MPC · JPL
139037	2001 DK_{105}	—	February 16, 2001	Anderson Mesa	LONEOS	·	1.2 km	MPC · JPL
139038	2001 ED_{2}	—	March 1, 2001	Socorro	LINEAR	·	1.8 km	MPC · JPL
139039	2001 EP_{3}	—	March 2, 2001	Anderson Mesa	LONEOS	·	1.5 km	MPC · JPL
139040	2001 EV_{5}	—	March 2, 2001	Anderson Mesa	LONEOS	·	1.7 km	MPC · JPL
139041	2001 EG_{6}	—	March 2, 2001	Anderson Mesa	LONEOS	·	1.5 km	MPC · JPL
139042	2001 EK_{6}	—	March 2, 2001	Anderson Mesa	LONEOS	·	2.4 km	MPC · JPL
139043	2001 ER_{6}	—	March 2, 2001	Anderson Mesa	LONEOS	·	1.3 km	MPC · JPL
139044	2001 EK_{7}	—	March 2, 2001	Anderson Mesa	LONEOS	·	2.0 km	MPC · JPL
139045	2001 EQ_{9}	—	March 2, 2001	Anderson Mesa	LONEOS	·	1.9 km	MPC · JPL
139046	2001 EE_{13}	—	March 14, 2001	Socorro	LINEAR	PHO	2.6 km	MPC · JPL
139047	2001 EB_{16}	—	March 14, 2001	Socorro	LINEAR	AMO +1km	1.2 km	MPC · JPL
139048	2001 EO_{20}	—	March 15, 2001	Anderson Mesa	LONEOS	·	1.5 km	MPC · JPL
139049	2001 EH_{21}	—	March 15, 2001	Anderson Mesa	LONEOS	·	1.5 km	MPC · JPL
139050	2001 EA_{22}	—	March 15, 2001	Anderson Mesa	LONEOS	(2076)	1.6 km	MPC · JPL
139051	2001 EJ_{23}	—	March 15, 2001	Haleakala	NEAT	(2076)	1.8 km	MPC · JPL
139052	2001 EG_{26}	—	March 2, 2001	Anderson Mesa	LONEOS	·	3.5 km	MPC · JPL
139053	2001 EP_{26}	—	March 2, 2001	Anderson Mesa	LONEOS	·	1.4 km	MPC · JPL
139054	2001 EJ_{27}	—	March 2, 2001	Anderson Mesa	LONEOS	·	1.4 km	MPC · JPL
139055	2001 FT	—	March 16, 2001	Socorro	LINEAR	·	3.2 km	MPC · JPL
139056	2001 FY	—	March 16, 2001	Socorro	LINEAR	AMO	320 m	MPC · JPL
139057	2001 FB_{1}	—	March 16, 2001	Kitt Peak	Spacewatch	·	1.2 km	MPC · JPL
139058	2001 FB_{2}	—	March 16, 2001	Socorro	LINEAR	PHO	2.2 km	MPC · JPL
139059	2001 FQ_{2}	—	March 18, 2001	Socorro	LINEAR	·	1.3 km	MPC · JPL
139060	2001 FD_{3}	—	March 18, 2001	Socorro	LINEAR	NYS	1.9 km	MPC · JPL
139061	2001 FF_{3}	—	March 18, 2001	Socorro	LINEAR	·	2.5 km	MPC · JPL
139062	2001 FD_{4}	—	March 19, 2001	Oizumi	T. Kobayashi	·	1.6 km	MPC · JPL
139063	2001 FJ_{5}	—	March 18, 2001	Socorro	LINEAR	·	1.4 km	MPC · JPL
139064	2001 FK_{5}	—	March 18, 2001	Socorro	LINEAR	·	1.8 km	MPC · JPL
139065	2001 FJ_{7}	—	March 19, 2001	Kitt Peak	Spacewatch	·	1.4 km	MPC · JPL
139066	2001 FY_{8}	—	March 19, 2001	Socorro	LINEAR	·	2.1 km	MPC · JPL
139067	2001 FC_{9}	—	March 20, 2001	Haleakala	NEAT	·	2.3 km	MPC · JPL
139068	2001 FG_{10}	—	March 19, 2001	Anderson Mesa	LONEOS	·	1.8 km	MPC · JPL
139069	2001 FJ_{11}	—	March 19, 2001	Anderson Mesa	LONEOS	·	2.1 km	MPC · JPL
139070	2001 FL_{11}	—	March 19, 2001	Anderson Mesa	LONEOS	·	1.8 km	MPC · JPL
139071	2001 FA_{12}	—	March 19, 2001	Anderson Mesa	LONEOS	·	1.3 km	MPC · JPL
139072	2001 FL_{12}	—	March 19, 2001	Anderson Mesa	LONEOS	·	1.3 km	MPC · JPL
139073	2001 FP_{13}	—	March 19, 2001	Anderson Mesa	LONEOS	·	2.0 km	MPC · JPL
139074	2001 FR_{13}	—	March 19, 2001	Anderson Mesa	LONEOS	·	1.9 km	MPC · JPL
139075	2001 FT_{13}	—	March 19, 2001	Anderson Mesa	LONEOS	·	1.5 km	MPC · JPL
139076	2001 FX_{13}	—	March 19, 2001	Anderson Mesa	LONEOS	·	2.5 km	MPC · JPL
139077	2001 FM_{14}	—	March 19, 2001	Anderson Mesa	LONEOS	·	2.1 km	MPC · JPL
139078	2001 FN_{14}	—	March 19, 2001	Anderson Mesa	LONEOS	·	1.6 km	MPC · JPL
139079	2001 FR_{15}	—	March 19, 2001	Anderson Mesa	LONEOS	·	1.9 km	MPC · JPL
139080	2001 FP_{16}	—	March 19, 2001	Anderson Mesa	LONEOS	NYS	1.8 km	MPC · JPL
139081	2001 FU_{16}	—	March 19, 2001	Anderson Mesa	LONEOS	NYS	2.1 km	MPC · JPL
139082	2001 FD_{18}	—	March 19, 2001	Anderson Mesa	LONEOS	NYS ·	1.7 km	MPC · JPL
139083	2001 FZ_{19}	—	March 19, 2001	Anderson Mesa	LONEOS	NYS	1.6 km	MPC · JPL
139084	2001 FY_{22}	—	March 21, 2001	Anderson Mesa	LONEOS	·	2.2 km	MPC · JPL
139085	2001 FE_{25}	—	March 18, 2001	Socorro	LINEAR	·	2.7 km	MPC · JPL
139086	2001 FL_{25}	—	March 18, 2001	Socorro	LINEAR	·	2.7 km	MPC · JPL
139087	2001 FW_{26}	—	March 18, 2001	Socorro	LINEAR	·	2.5 km	MPC · JPL
139088	2001 FD_{28}	—	March 19, 2001	Socorro	LINEAR	·	1.5 km	MPC · JPL
139089	2001 FS_{28}	—	March 19, 2001	Socorro	LINEAR	(2076)	1.6 km	MPC · JPL
139090	2001 FE_{29}	—	March 19, 2001	Socorro	LINEAR	·	2.5 km	MPC · JPL
139091	2001 FT_{30}	—	March 21, 2001	Haleakala	NEAT	·	1.4 km	MPC · JPL
139092	2001 FU_{32}	—	March 20, 2001	Socorro	LINEAR	·	2.5 km	MPC · JPL
139093	2001 FC_{34}	—	March 18, 2001	Socorro	LINEAR	·	1.9 km	MPC · JPL
139094	2001 FK_{34}	—	March 18, 2001	Socorro	LINEAR	·	1.4 km	MPC · JPL
139095	2001 FR_{34}	—	March 18, 2001	Socorro	LINEAR	MAS	1.4 km	MPC · JPL
139096	2001 FS_{34}	—	March 18, 2001	Socorro	LINEAR	NYS	2.0 km	MPC · JPL
139097	2001 FZ_{34}	—	March 18, 2001	Socorro	LINEAR	V	1.4 km	MPC · JPL
139098	2001 FP_{36}	—	March 18, 2001	Socorro	LINEAR	·	1.2 km	MPC · JPL
139099	2001 FK_{38}	—	March 18, 2001	Socorro	LINEAR	·	1.7 km	MPC · JPL
139100	2001 FW_{39}	—	March 18, 2001	Socorro	LINEAR	·	1.4 km	MPC · JPL

== 139101–139200 ==
back to top

Designation			Discovery			Properties		Ref
Permanent	Provisional	Named after	Date	Site	Discoverer(s)	Category	Diam.	Ref
139101	2001 FH_{41}	—	March 18, 2001	Socorro	LINEAR	V	1.3 km	MPC · JPL
139102	2001 FT_{42}	—	March 18, 2001	Socorro	LINEAR	·	1.8 km	MPC · JPL
139103	2001 FW_{42}	—	March 18, 2001	Socorro	LINEAR	·	1.6 km	MPC · JPL
139104	2001 FH_{44}	—	March 18, 2001	Socorro	LINEAR	·	2.0 km	MPC · JPL
139105	2001 FX_{46}	—	March 18, 2001	Socorro	LINEAR	·	2.3 km	MPC · JPL
139106	2001 FC_{47}	—	March 18, 2001	Socorro	LINEAR	NYS	2.2 km	MPC · JPL
139107	2001 FL_{47}	—	March 18, 2001	Socorro	LINEAR	·	4.3 km	MPC · JPL
139108	2001 FA_{50}	—	March 18, 2001	Socorro	LINEAR	·	2.1 km	MPC · JPL
139109	2001 FV_{50}	—	March 18, 2001	Socorro	LINEAR	·	2.3 km	MPC · JPL
139110	2001 FJ_{51}	—	March 18, 2001	Socorro	LINEAR	·	1.4 km	MPC · JPL
139111	2001 FP_{53}	—	March 18, 2001	Socorro	LINEAR	·	1.9 km	MPC · JPL
139112	2001 FZ_{53}	—	March 18, 2001	Socorro	LINEAR	BAR	1.8 km	MPC · JPL
139113	2001 FA_{55}	—	March 19, 2001	Socorro	LINEAR	NYS	2.3 km	MPC · JPL
139114	2001 FH_{57}	—	March 21, 2001	Haleakala	NEAT	·	1.4 km	MPC · JPL
139115	2001 FU_{59}	—	March 19, 2001	Socorro	LINEAR	·	3.2 km	MPC · JPL
139116	2001 FB_{60}	—	March 19, 2001	Socorro	LINEAR	V	1.2 km	MPC · JPL
139117	2001 FD_{60}	—	March 19, 2001	Socorro	LINEAR	·	1.5 km	MPC · JPL
139118	2001 FZ_{60}	—	March 19, 2001	Socorro	LINEAR	NYS	1.7 km	MPC · JPL
139119	2001 FJ_{61}	—	March 19, 2001	Socorro	LINEAR	V	990 m	MPC · JPL
139120	2001 FY_{61}	—	March 19, 2001	Socorro	LINEAR	NYS	1.6 km	MPC · JPL
139121	2001 FU_{62}	—	March 19, 2001	Socorro	LINEAR	NYS	2.0 km	MPC · JPL
139122	2001 FT_{63}	—	March 19, 2001	Socorro	LINEAR	·	1.4 km	MPC · JPL
139123	2001 FD_{64}	—	March 19, 2001	Socorro	LINEAR	·	1.3 km	MPC · JPL
139124	2001 FY_{64}	—	March 19, 2001	Socorro	LINEAR	·	2.3 km	MPC · JPL
139125	2001 FE_{65}	—	March 19, 2001	Socorro	LINEAR	·	2.3 km	MPC · JPL
139126	2001 FX_{68}	—	March 19, 2001	Socorro	LINEAR	NYS	2.2 km	MPC · JPL
139127	2001 FK_{69}	—	March 19, 2001	Socorro	LINEAR	·	2.2 km	MPC · JPL
139128	2001 FZ_{69}	—	March 19, 2001	Socorro	LINEAR	·	1.4 km	MPC · JPL
139129	2001 FA_{71}	—	March 19, 2001	Socorro	LINEAR	·	1.5 km	MPC · JPL
139130	2001 FF_{71}	—	March 19, 2001	Socorro	LINEAR	·	2.7 km	MPC · JPL
139131	2001 FB_{72}	—	March 19, 2001	Socorro	LINEAR	·	1.5 km	MPC · JPL
139132	2001 FQ_{72}	—	March 19, 2001	Socorro	LINEAR	·	1.9 km	MPC · JPL
139133	2001 FR_{74}	—	March 19, 2001	Socorro	LINEAR	V · slow	1.5 km	MPC · JPL
139134	2001 FJ_{76}	—	March 19, 2001	Socorro	LINEAR	·	1.6 km	MPC · JPL
139135	2001 FK_{76}	—	March 19, 2001	Socorro	LINEAR	·	2.5 km	MPC · JPL
139136	2001 FZ_{78}	—	March 19, 2001	Socorro	LINEAR	·	2.5 km	MPC · JPL
139137	2001 FP_{81}	—	March 23, 2001	Socorro	LINEAR	·	1.9 km	MPC · JPL
139138	2001 FM_{83}	—	March 26, 2001	Kitt Peak	Spacewatch	·	1.2 km	MPC · JPL
139139	2001 FF_{84}	—	March 26, 2001	Kitt Peak	Spacewatch	·	2.3 km	MPC · JPL
139140	2001 FC_{87}	—	March 21, 2001	Anderson Mesa	LONEOS	·	1.5 km	MPC · JPL
139141	2001 FF_{87}	—	March 21, 2001	Anderson Mesa	LONEOS	·	2.5 km	MPC · JPL
139142	2001 FP_{88}	—	March 26, 2001	Kitt Peak	Spacewatch	·	2.0 km	MPC · JPL
139143	2001 FM_{91}	—	March 27, 2001	Desert Beaver	W. K. Y. Yeung	·	4.1 km	MPC · JPL
139144	2001 FD_{92}	—	March 16, 2001	Socorro	LINEAR	ERI	4.0 km	MPC · JPL
139145	2001 FG_{92}	—	March 16, 2001	Socorro	LINEAR	·	2.1 km	MPC · JPL
139146	2001 FW_{92}	—	March 16, 2001	Socorro	LINEAR	·	2.0 km	MPC · JPL
139147	2001 FF_{94}	—	March 16, 2001	Socorro	LINEAR	·	2.5 km	MPC · JPL
139148	2001 FL_{94}	—	March 16, 2001	Socorro	LINEAR	V	1.1 km	MPC · JPL
139149	2001 FQ_{94}	—	March 16, 2001	Socorro	LINEAR	PHO	2.0 km	MPC · JPL
139150	2001 FN_{95}	—	March 16, 2001	Socorro	LINEAR	·	1.6 km	MPC · JPL
139151	2001 FO_{98}	—	March 16, 2001	Socorro	LINEAR	·	2.3 km	MPC · JPL
139152	2001 FA_{99}	—	March 16, 2001	Socorro	LINEAR	EUN	2.5 km	MPC · JPL
139153	2001 FW_{101}	—	March 17, 2001	Socorro	LINEAR	·	2.0 km	MPC · JPL
139154	2001 FB_{105}	—	March 18, 2001	Socorro	LINEAR	·	3.5 km	MPC · JPL
139155	2001 FO_{105}	—	March 18, 2001	Socorro	LINEAR	V	1.2 km	MPC · JPL
139156	2001 FP_{106}	—	March 18, 2001	Socorro	LINEAR	·	1.6 km	MPC · JPL
139157	2001 FS_{107}	—	March 18, 2001	Anderson Mesa	LONEOS	·	1.3 km	MPC · JPL
139158	2001 FE_{108}	—	March 18, 2001	Socorro	LINEAR	MAS	1.4 km	MPC · JPL
139159	2001 FM_{109}	—	March 18, 2001	Socorro	LINEAR	·	1.9 km	MPC · JPL
139160	2001 FX_{111}	—	March 18, 2001	Socorro	LINEAR	·	1.3 km	MPC · JPL
139161	2001 FW_{112}	—	March 18, 2001	Haleakala	NEAT	·	2.4 km	MPC · JPL
139162	2001 FU_{113}	—	March 19, 2001	Anderson Mesa	LONEOS	NYS	1.7 km	MPC · JPL
139163	2001 FW_{113}	—	March 19, 2001	Anderson Mesa	LONEOS	MAS	1.1 km	MPC · JPL
139164	2001 FL_{114}	—	March 19, 2001	Anderson Mesa	LONEOS	·	1.3 km	MPC · JPL
139165	2001 FC_{115}	—	March 19, 2001	Anderson Mesa	LONEOS	·	2.0 km	MPC · JPL
139166	2001 FH_{118}	—	March 20, 2001	Socorro	LINEAR	·	1.3 km	MPC · JPL
139167	2001 FQ_{122}	—	March 23, 2001	Anderson Mesa	LONEOS	·	2.3 km	MPC · JPL
139168	2001 FN_{123}	—	March 23, 2001	Anderson Mesa	LONEOS	V	1.1 km	MPC · JPL
139169	2001 FH_{124}	—	March 24, 2001	Anderson Mesa	LONEOS	V	1.2 km	MPC · JPL
139170	2001 FU_{126}	—	March 26, 2001	Socorro	LINEAR	·	2.9 km	MPC · JPL
139171	2001 FY_{126}	—	March 26, 2001	Socorro	LINEAR	NYS	1.5 km	MPC · JPL
139172	2001 FQ_{129}	—	March 26, 2001	Socorro	LINEAR	·	2.2 km	MPC · JPL
139173	2001 FW_{129}	—	March 29, 2001	Socorro	LINEAR	·	1.6 km	MPC · JPL
139174	2001 FS_{131}	—	March 20, 2001	Haleakala	NEAT	ERI	3.4 km	MPC · JPL
139175	2001 FN_{132}	—	March 20, 2001	Haleakala	NEAT	·	1.6 km	MPC · JPL
139176	2001 FG_{133}	—	March 20, 2001	Haleakala	NEAT	V	1.3 km	MPC · JPL
139177	2001 FQ_{137}	—	March 21, 2001	Anderson Mesa	LONEOS	·	2.4 km	MPC · JPL
139178	2001 FR_{137}	—	March 21, 2001	Anderson Mesa	LONEOS	·	3.8 km	MPC · JPL
139179	2001 FT_{137}	—	March 21, 2001	Anderson Mesa	LONEOS	NYS	1.8 km	MPC · JPL
139180	2001 FU_{137}	—	March 21, 2001	Anderson Mesa	LONEOS	·	3.2 km	MPC · JPL
139181	2001 FB_{138}	—	March 21, 2001	Anderson Mesa	LONEOS	·	1.5 km	MPC · JPL
139182	2001 FC_{138}	—	March 21, 2001	Anderson Mesa	LONEOS	EOS	3.4 km	MPC · JPL
139183	2001 FY_{140}	—	March 22, 2001	Kitt Peak	Spacewatch	·	1.1 km	MPC · JPL
139184	2001 FU_{143}	—	March 23, 2001	Anderson Mesa	LONEOS	·	3.2 km	MPC · JPL
139185	2001 FH_{144}	—	March 23, 2001	Anderson Mesa	LONEOS	ERI	3.3 km	MPC · JPL
139186	2001 FR_{144}	—	March 23, 2001	Anderson Mesa	LONEOS	·	2.3 km	MPC · JPL
139187	2001 FE_{147}	—	March 24, 2001	Anderson Mesa	LONEOS	·	2.1 km	MPC · JPL
139188	2001 FO_{149}	—	March 24, 2001	Anderson Mesa	LONEOS	·	1.4 km	MPC · JPL
139189	2001 FW_{149}	—	March 24, 2001	Anderson Mesa	LONEOS	·	1.4 km	MPC · JPL
139190	2001 FM_{151}	—	March 24, 2001	Haleakala	NEAT	·	6.6 km	MPC · JPL
139191	2001 FG_{152}	—	March 26, 2001	Socorro	LINEAR	·	1.5 km	MPC · JPL
139192	2001 FC_{153}	—	March 26, 2001	Socorro	LINEAR	·	2.2 km	MPC · JPL
139193	2001 FV_{156}	—	March 26, 2001	Haleakala	NEAT	·	1.7 km	MPC · JPL
139194	2001 FB_{157}	—	March 27, 2001	Anderson Mesa	LONEOS	V	1.2 km	MPC · JPL
139195	2001 FT_{158}	—	March 27, 2001	Haleakala	NEAT	·	1.6 km	MPC · JPL
139196	2001 FJ_{161}	—	March 29, 2001	Haleakala	NEAT	NYS	2.4 km	MPC · JPL
139197	2001 FR_{161}	—	March 30, 2001	Socorro	LINEAR	·	2.9 km	MPC · JPL
139198	2001 FP_{162}	—	March 31, 2001	Kitt Peak	Spacewatch	·	1.8 km	MPC · JPL
139199	2001 FV_{163}	—	March 18, 2001	Anderson Mesa	LONEOS	·	1.9 km	MPC · JPL
139200	2001 FZ_{164}	—	March 18, 2001	Haleakala	NEAT	·	4.1 km	MPC · JPL

== 139201–139300 ==
back to top

Designation			Discovery			Properties		Ref
Permanent	Provisional	Named after	Date	Site	Discoverer(s)	Category	Diam.	Ref
139201	2001 FC_{166}	—	March 19, 2001	Anderson Mesa	LONEOS	·	2.1 km	MPC · JPL
139202	2001 FQ_{166}	—	March 19, 2001	Anderson Mesa	LONEOS	V	1.1 km	MPC · JPL
139203	2001 FE_{167}	—	March 19, 2001	Socorro	LINEAR	·	2.7 km	MPC · JPL
139204	2001 FQ_{169}	—	March 23, 2001	Haleakala	NEAT	·	3.4 km	MPC · JPL
139205	2001 FA_{175}	—	March 20, 2001	Anderson Mesa	LONEOS	·	2.5 km	MPC · JPL
139206	2001 FE_{176}	—	March 16, 2001	Socorro	LINEAR	·	1.9 km	MPC · JPL
139207	2001 FW_{179}	—	March 20, 2001	Anderson Mesa	LONEOS	·	1.6 km	MPC · JPL
139208	2001 FW_{191}	—	March 22, 2001	Kitt Peak	Spacewatch	MAS	1.1 km	MPC · JPL
139209	2001 FB_{195}	—	March 20, 2001	Anderson Mesa	LONEOS	V	1.0 km	MPC · JPL
139210	2001 GJ	—	April 1, 2001	Socorro	LINEAR	·	1.4 km	MPC · JPL
139211	2001 GN_{2}	—	April 12, 2001	Socorro	LINEAR	AMO +1km · PHA	990 m	MPC · JPL
139212	2001 GE_{3}	—	April 14, 2001	Socorro	LINEAR	·	3.2 km	MPC · JPL
139213	2001 GH_{7}	—	April 15, 2001	Socorro	LINEAR	·	2.3 km	MPC · JPL
139214	2001 GS_{7}	—	April 15, 2001	Socorro	LINEAR	·	3.4 km	MPC · JPL
139215	2001 GQ_{9}	—	April 15, 2001	Socorro	LINEAR	·	2.1 km	MPC · JPL
139216	2001 GB_{10}	—	April 15, 2001	Haleakala	NEAT	·	2.7 km	MPC · JPL
139217	2001 GW_{10}	—	April 15, 2001	Haleakala	NEAT	·	2.7 km	MPC · JPL
139218	2001 GP_{11}	—	April 1, 2001	Kitt Peak	Spacewatch	·	2.2 km	MPC · JPL
139219	2001 HF	—	April 16, 2001	Socorro	LINEAR	·	4.0 km	MPC · JPL
139220	2001 HA_{1}	—	April 16, 2001	Socorro	LINEAR	·	1.9 km	MPC · JPL
139221	2001 HL_{1}	—	April 17, 2001	Socorro	LINEAR	·	2.0 km	MPC · JPL
139222	2001 HL_{4}	—	April 17, 2001	Desert Beaver	W. K. Y. Yeung	·	2.9 km	MPC · JPL
139223	2001 HB_{5}	—	April 16, 2001	Socorro	LINEAR	·	1.5 km	MPC · JPL
139224	2001 HN_{5}	—	April 18, 2001	Socorro	LINEAR	·	2.7 km	MPC · JPL
139225	2001 HE_{6}	—	April 18, 2001	Socorro	LINEAR	·	2.7 km	MPC · JPL
139226	2001 HF_{6}	—	April 18, 2001	Socorro	LINEAR	·	3.8 km	MPC · JPL
139227	2001 HC_{7}	—	April 18, 2001	Kitt Peak	Spacewatch	·	2.6 km	MPC · JPL
139228	2001 HM_{11}	—	April 18, 2001	Socorro	LINEAR	·	2.2 km	MPC · JPL
139229	2001 HU_{13}	—	April 21, 2001	Socorro	LINEAR	·	2.1 km	MPC · JPL
139230	2001 HR_{16}	—	April 25, 2001	Badlands	Dyvig, R.	·	2.4 km	MPC · JPL
139231	2001 HW_{16}	—	April 22, 2001	San Marcello	L. Tesi, M. Tombelli	·	1.8 km	MPC · JPL
139232	2001 HO_{17}	—	April 24, 2001	Kitt Peak	Spacewatch	·	2.1 km	MPC · JPL
139233 Henych	2001 HT_{18}	Henych	April 25, 2001	Ondřejov	P. Kušnirák, P. Pravec	·	3.2 km	MPC · JPL
139234	2001 HT_{19}	—	April 24, 2001	Kitt Peak	Spacewatch	·	2.6 km	MPC · JPL
139235	2001 HY_{20}	—	April 23, 2001	Socorro	LINEAR	·	2.1 km	MPC · JPL
139236	2001 HZ_{20}	—	April 23, 2001	Socorro	LINEAR	·	1.1 km	MPC · JPL
139237	2001 HH_{22}	—	April 24, 2001	Socorro	LINEAR	·	2.2 km	MPC · JPL
139238	2001 HP_{22}	—	April 25, 2001	Desert Beaver	W. K. Y. Yeung	NYS	2.9 km	MPC · JPL
139239	2001 HL_{23}	—	April 23, 2001	Kitt Peak	Spacewatch	·	1.7 km	MPC · JPL
139240	2001 HQ_{27}	—	April 27, 2001	Socorro	LINEAR	NYS	2.2 km	MPC · JPL
139241	2001 HT_{27}	—	April 27, 2001	Socorro	LINEAR	·	2.1 km	MPC · JPL
139242	2001 HA_{29}	—	April 27, 2001	Socorro	LINEAR	·	2.5 km	MPC · JPL
139243	2001 HH_{29}	—	April 27, 2001	Socorro	LINEAR	NYS	2.3 km	MPC · JPL
139244	2001 HM_{30}	—	April 24, 2001	Ondřejov	P. Pravec	·	1.2 km	MPC · JPL
139245	2001 HS_{30}	—	April 26, 2001	Kitt Peak	Spacewatch	·	3.2 km	MPC · JPL
139246	2001 HQ_{32}	—	April 23, 2001	Socorro	LINEAR	·	2.2 km	MPC · JPL
139247	2001 HU_{32}	—	April 23, 2001	Socorro	LINEAR	·	2.4 km	MPC · JPL
139248	2001 HA_{33}	—	April 27, 2001	Socorro	LINEAR	·	2.2 km	MPC · JPL
139249	2001 HR_{33}	—	April 27, 2001	Socorro	LINEAR	·	2.5 km	MPC · JPL
139250	2001 HJ_{36}	—	April 29, 2001	Socorro	LINEAR	MAS	1.4 km	MPC · JPL
139251	2001 HU_{38}	—	April 26, 2001	Kitt Peak	Spacewatch	·	1.2 km	MPC · JPL
139252	2001 HY_{38}	—	April 26, 2001	Kitt Peak	Spacewatch	V	1.0 km	MPC · JPL
139253	2001 HR_{39}	—	April 26, 2001	Kitt Peak	Spacewatch	·	2.4 km	MPC · JPL
139254	2001 HG_{40}	—	April 30, 2001	Kitt Peak	Spacewatch	·	2.0 km	MPC · JPL
139255	2001 HP_{44}	—	April 16, 2001	Anderson Mesa	LONEOS	·	1.3 km	MPC · JPL
139256	2001 HE_{46}	—	April 17, 2001	Anderson Mesa	LONEOS	(194)	2.0 km	MPC · JPL
139257	2001 HV_{46}	—	April 18, 2001	Socorro	LINEAR	·	2.6 km	MPC · JPL
139258	2001 HH_{47}	—	April 18, 2001	Kitt Peak	Spacewatch	·	2.5 km	MPC · JPL
139259	2001 HR_{47}	—	April 18, 2001	Haleakala	NEAT	·	2.1 km	MPC · JPL
139260	2001 HL_{49}	—	April 21, 2001	Socorro	LINEAR	slow	2.6 km	MPC · JPL
139261	2001 HQ_{51}	—	April 23, 2001	Socorro	LINEAR	·	1.2 km	MPC · JPL
139262	2001 HC_{52}	—	April 23, 2001	Socorro	LINEAR	·	1.4 km	MPC · JPL
139263	2001 HH_{54}	—	April 24, 2001	Anderson Mesa	LONEOS	ADE	5.2 km	MPC · JPL
139264	2001 HN_{54}	—	April 24, 2001	Socorro	LINEAR	·	2.7 km	MPC · JPL
139265	2001 HV_{54}	—	April 24, 2001	Socorro	LINEAR	·	1.8 km	MPC · JPL
139266	2001 HB_{56}	—	April 24, 2001	Socorro	LINEAR	PHO	1.6 km	MPC · JPL
139267	2001 HV_{56}	—	April 24, 2001	Haleakala	NEAT	·	1.9 km	MPC · JPL
139268	2001 HZ_{56}	—	April 24, 2001	Haleakala	NEAT	·	1.4 km	MPC · JPL
139269	2001 HW_{59}	—	April 23, 2001	Socorro	LINEAR	·	1.6 km	MPC · JPL
139270	2001 HU_{61}	—	April 24, 2001	Haleakala	NEAT	·	2.9 km	MPC · JPL
139271	2001 HM_{63}	—	April 26, 2001	Anderson Mesa	LONEOS	·	1.7 km	MPC · JPL
139272	2001 HO_{63}	—	April 26, 2001	Anderson Mesa	LONEOS	V	1.6 km	MPC · JPL
139273	2001 HQ_{63}	—	April 26, 2001	Anderson Mesa	LONEOS	·	2.6 km	MPC · JPL
139274	2001 HV_{63}	—	April 26, 2001	Haleakala	NEAT	·	2.2 km	MPC · JPL
139275	2001 HR_{64}	—	April 27, 2001	Kitt Peak	Spacewatch	NYS	2.1 km	MPC · JPL
139276	2001 HY_{64}	—	April 27, 2001	Haleakala	NEAT	NYS	2.0 km	MPC · JPL
139277	2001 JJ	—	May 2, 2001	Palomar	NEAT	·	980 m	MPC · JPL
139278	2001 JN_{2}	—	May 15, 2001	Kitt Peak	Spacewatch	·	2.4 km	MPC · JPL
139279	2001 JM_{4}	—	May 15, 2001	Palomar	NEAT	·	2.1 km	MPC · JPL
139280	2001 JO_{5}	—	May 14, 2001	Haleakala	NEAT	NYS	2.2 km	MPC · JPL
139281	2001 JQ_{5}	—	May 15, 2001	Anderson Mesa	LONEOS	·	1.5 km	MPC · JPL
139282	2001 JT_{5}	—	May 15, 2001	Anderson Mesa	LONEOS	·	1.8 km	MPC · JPL
139283	2001 JZ_{5}	—	May 11, 2001	Haleakala	NEAT	·	1.9 km	MPC · JPL
139284	2001 JM_{6}	—	May 14, 2001	Palomar	NEAT	·	3.1 km	MPC · JPL
139285	2001 JJ_{7}	—	May 15, 2001	Anderson Mesa	LONEOS	·	2.4 km	MPC · JPL
139286	2001 JE_{8}	—	May 15, 2001	Anderson Mesa	LONEOS	·	2.8 km	MPC · JPL
139287	2001 JT_{8}	—	May 15, 2001	Palomar	NEAT	·	2.5 km	MPC · JPL
139288	2001 JT_{10}	—	May 15, 2001	Anderson Mesa	LONEOS	JUN	1.8 km	MPC · JPL
139289	2001 KR_{1}	—	May 18, 2001	Anderson Mesa	LONEOS	APO +1km	1.1 km	MPC · JPL
139290	2001 KC_{2}	—	May 20, 2001	Ondřejov	P. Pravec, P. Kušnirák	·	2.3 km	MPC · JPL
139291	2001 KL_{3}	—	May 17, 2001	Socorro	LINEAR	V	2.0 km	MPC · JPL
139292	2001 KS_{3}	—	May 17, 2001	Socorro	LINEAR	EUN	2.0 km	MPC · JPL
139293	2001 KF_{4}	—	May 17, 2001	Socorro	LINEAR	·	1.5 km	MPC · JPL
139294	2001 KM_{5}	—	May 17, 2001	Socorro	LINEAR	·	2.2 km	MPC · JPL
139295	2001 KK_{6}	—	May 17, 2001	Socorro	LINEAR	·	1.8 km	MPC · JPL
139296	2001 KD_{7}	—	May 17, 2001	Socorro	LINEAR	·	2.4 km	MPC · JPL
139297	2001 KH_{8}	—	May 18, 2001	Socorro	LINEAR	ERI	2.6 km	MPC · JPL
139298	2001 KG_{12}	—	May 18, 2001	Socorro	LINEAR	·	2.2 km	MPC · JPL
139299	2001 KH_{12}	—	May 18, 2001	Socorro	LINEAR	·	2.9 km	MPC · JPL
139300	2001 KC_{13}	—	May 18, 2001	Socorro	LINEAR	·	4.2 km	MPC · JPL

== 139301–139400 ==
back to top

Designation			Discovery			Properties		Ref
Permanent	Provisional	Named after	Date	Site	Discoverer(s)	Category	Diam.	Ref
139301	2001 KN_{14}	—	May 18, 2001	Socorro	LINEAR	·	2.3 km	MPC · JPL
139302	2001 KV_{14}	—	May 18, 2001	Socorro	LINEAR	·	1.9 km	MPC · JPL
139303	2001 KA_{15}	—	May 18, 2001	Socorro	LINEAR	ERI	2.4 km	MPC · JPL
139304	2001 KR_{17}	—	May 21, 2001	Socorro	LINEAR	·	1.7 km	MPC · JPL
139305	2001 KS_{17}	—	May 18, 2001	Anderson Mesa	LONEOS	·	3.1 km	MPC · JPL
139306	2001 KV_{17}	—	May 22, 2001	Reedy Creek	J. Broughton	·	2.8 km	MPC · JPL
139307	2001 KD_{19}	—	May 18, 2001	Socorro	LINEAR	·	2.5 km	MPC · JPL
139308	2001 KH_{20}	—	May 22, 2001	Wise	Wise	V	1.3 km	MPC · JPL
139309	2001 KH_{22}	—	May 17, 2001	Socorro	LINEAR	·	2.1 km	MPC · JPL
139310	2001 KQ_{22}	—	May 17, 2001	Socorro	LINEAR	·	2.4 km	MPC · JPL
139311	2001 KJ_{23}	—	May 17, 2001	Socorro	LINEAR	·	1.9 km	MPC · JPL
139312	2001 KO_{23}	—	May 17, 2001	Socorro	LINEAR	V	1.1 km	MPC · JPL
139313	2001 KD_{25}	—	May 17, 2001	Socorro	LINEAR	·	2.8 km	MPC · JPL
139314	2001 KK_{25}	—	May 17, 2001	Socorro	LINEAR	·	1.4 km	MPC · JPL
139315	2001 KL_{25}	—	May 17, 2001	Socorro	LINEAR	·	2.3 km	MPC · JPL
139316	2001 KN_{25}	—	May 17, 2001	Socorro	LINEAR	(5)	1.9 km	MPC · JPL
139317	2001 KY_{25}	—	May 17, 2001	Socorro	LINEAR	·	2.5 km	MPC · JPL
139318	2001 KD_{26}	—	May 17, 2001	Socorro	LINEAR	·	3.8 km	MPC · JPL
139319	2001 KL_{26}	—	May 17, 2001	Socorro	LINEAR	MAS	1.4 km	MPC · JPL
139320	2001 KL_{29}	—	May 21, 2001	Socorro	LINEAR	·	2.0 km	MPC · JPL
139321	2001 KA_{31}	—	May 21, 2001	Socorro	LINEAR	MAS	1.3 km	MPC · JPL
139322	2001 KC_{32}	—	May 23, 2001	Socorro	LINEAR	·	2.2 km	MPC · JPL
139323	2001 KD_{32}	—	May 23, 2001	Socorro	LINEAR	·	3.4 km	MPC · JPL
139324	2001 KO_{32}	—	May 24, 2001	Kitt Peak	Spacewatch	·	2.3 km	MPC · JPL
139325	2001 KT_{32}	—	May 24, 2001	Kitt Peak	Spacewatch	·	1.1 km	MPC · JPL
139326	2001 KQ_{34}	—	May 18, 2001	Socorro	LINEAR	·	1.8 km	MPC · JPL
139327	2001 KY_{35}	—	May 18, 2001	Socorro	LINEAR	·	1.9 km	MPC · JPL
139328	2001 KO_{36}	—	May 21, 2001	Socorro	LINEAR	·	3.1 km	MPC · JPL
139329	2001 KF_{37}	—	May 21, 2001	Socorro	LINEAR	·	4.3 km	MPC · JPL
139330	2001 KW_{38}	—	May 22, 2001	Socorro	LINEAR	·	4.8 km	MPC · JPL
139331	2001 KW_{44}	—	May 22, 2001	Socorro	LINEAR	·	2.9 km	MPC · JPL
139332	2001 KH_{46}	—	May 22, 2001	Socorro	LINEAR	·	1.8 km	MPC · JPL
139333	2001 KD_{47}	—	May 23, 2001	Socorro	LINEAR	EUN	2.3 km	MPC · JPL
139334	2001 KJ_{50}	—	May 20, 2001	Haleakala	NEAT	·	3.9 km	MPC · JPL
139335	2001 KJ_{52}	—	May 17, 2001	Haleakala	NEAT	·	2.6 km	MPC · JPL
139336	2001 KE_{53}	—	May 18, 2001	Socorro	LINEAR	·	2.4 km	MPC · JPL
139337	2001 KF_{53}	—	May 18, 2001	Socorro	LINEAR	V	990 m	MPC · JPL
139338	2001 KV_{53}	—	May 20, 2001	Haleakala	NEAT	·	5.7 km	MPC · JPL
139339	2001 KA_{57}	—	May 23, 2001	Socorro	LINEAR	EUN	1.9 km	MPC · JPL
139340	2001 KB_{58}	—	May 26, 2001	Socorro	LINEAR	RAF	1.8 km	MPC · JPL
139341	2001 KQ_{58}	—	May 26, 2001	Socorro	LINEAR	·	1.4 km	MPC · JPL
139342	2001 KF_{60}	—	May 27, 2001	Haleakala	NEAT	·	2.5 km	MPC · JPL
139343	2001 KC_{62}	—	May 18, 2001	Socorro	LINEAR	·	2.3 km	MPC · JPL
139344	2001 KH_{66}	—	May 22, 2001	Anderson Mesa	LONEOS	PHO	3.4 km	MPC · JPL
139345	2001 KA_{67}	—	May 30, 2001	Anderson Mesa	LONEOS	APO +1km	2.6 km	MPC · JPL
139346	2001 KO_{70}	—	May 23, 2001	Kitt Peak	Spacewatch	·	2.3 km	MPC · JPL
139347	2001 KM_{71}	—	May 24, 2001	Anderson Mesa	LONEOS	·	1.9 km	MPC · JPL
139348	2001 KU_{73}	—	May 25, 2001	Socorro	LINEAR	·	1.8 km	MPC · JPL
139349	2001 KL_{74}	—	May 26, 2001	Socorro	LINEAR	·	2.2 km	MPC · JPL
139350	2001 KM_{75}	—	May 31, 2001	Palomar	NEAT	EUN	1.8 km	MPC · JPL
139351	2001 LJ_{6}	—	June 14, 2001	Palomar	NEAT	·	4.8 km	MPC · JPL
139352	2001 LY_{7}	—	June 15, 2001	Palomar	NEAT	HNS	2.5 km	MPC · JPL
139353	2001 LW_{11}	—	June 15, 2001	Socorro	LINEAR	·	2.5 km	MPC · JPL
139354	2001 LD_{12}	—	June 15, 2001	Socorro	LINEAR	ADE ·	2.8 km	MPC · JPL
139355	2001 LA_{13}	—	June 15, 2001	Socorro	LINEAR	·	5.8 km	MPC · JPL
139356	2001 LL_{14}	—	June 15, 2001	Socorro	LINEAR	·	2.6 km	MPC · JPL
139357	2001 LY_{15}	—	June 12, 2001	Haleakala	NEAT	·	1.9 km	MPC · JPL
139358	2001 LJ_{18}	—	June 13, 2001	Anderson Mesa	LONEOS	·	2.1 km	MPC · JPL
139359	2001 ME_{1}	—	June 16, 2001	Socorro	LINEAR	T_{j} (2.67) · APO +1km · PHA	1.8 km	MPC · JPL
139360	2001 MU_{2}	—	June 16, 2001	Palomar	NEAT	·	2.1 km	MPC · JPL
139361	2001 MV_{2}	—	June 16, 2001	Palomar	NEAT	·	2.7 km	MPC · JPL
139362	2001 MZ_{4}	—	June 21, 2001	Palomar	NEAT	·	4.5 km	MPC · JPL
139363	2001 ME_{8}	—	June 20, 2001	Haleakala	NEAT	GEF	2.2 km	MPC · JPL
139364	2001 MO_{8}	—	June 24, 2001	Desert Beaver	W. K. Y. Yeung	·	3.2 km	MPC · JPL
139365	2001 MX_{8}	—	June 19, 2001	Palomar	NEAT	·	4.4 km	MPC · JPL
139366	2001 MP_{10}	—	June 20, 2001	Palomar	NEAT	(21344)	2.4 km	MPC · JPL
139367	2001 ME_{12}	—	June 21, 2001	Palomar	NEAT	·	2.9 km	MPC · JPL
139368	2001 MH_{12}	—	June 21, 2001	Palomar	NEAT	·	2.8 km	MPC · JPL
139369	2001 MY_{13}	—	June 24, 2001	Kitt Peak	Spacewatch	·	1.8 km	MPC · JPL
139370	2001 MJ_{14}	—	June 28, 2001	Anderson Mesa	LONEOS	MRX	2.1 km	MPC · JPL
139371	2001 MH_{16}	—	June 27, 2001	Palomar	NEAT	·	3.8 km	MPC · JPL
139372	2001 MD_{17}	—	June 27, 2001	Palomar	NEAT	·	2.9 km	MPC · JPL
139373	2001 MA_{18}	—	June 28, 2001	Anderson Mesa	LONEOS	ADE	4.5 km	MPC · JPL
139374	2001 MW_{18}	—	June 29, 2001	Anderson Mesa	LONEOS	GEF	2.4 km	MPC · JPL
139375	2001 MY_{19}	—	June 25, 2001	Palomar	NEAT	·	2.5 km	MPC · JPL
139376	2001 MN_{20}	—	June 25, 2001	Palomar	NEAT	·	3.1 km	MPC · JPL
139377	2001 MW_{20}	—	June 25, 2001	Palomar	NEAT	·	4.5 km	MPC · JPL
139378	2001 MH_{21}	—	June 27, 2001	Palomar	NEAT	EUN	2.8 km	MPC · JPL
139379	2001 MZ_{22}	—	June 30, 2001	Palomar	NEAT	·	1.8 km	MPC · JPL
139380	2001 MT_{23}	—	June 27, 2001	Haleakala	NEAT	·	3.1 km	MPC · JPL
139381	2001 MC_{24}	—	June 27, 2001	Haleakala	NEAT	·	1.9 km	MPC · JPL
139382	2001 MP_{26}	—	June 19, 2001	Haleakala	NEAT	·	1.5 km	MPC · JPL
139383	2001 MA_{27}	—	June 20, 2001	Anderson Mesa	LONEOS	·	2.8 km	MPC · JPL
139384	2001 MQ_{27}	—	June 20, 2001	Haleakala	NEAT	EUN	2.3 km	MPC · JPL
139385	2001 MT_{28}	—	June 27, 2001	Anderson Mesa	LONEOS	HYG	5.6 km	MPC · JPL
139386	2001 NP_{1}	—	July 10, 2001	Palomar	NEAT	·	2.1 km	MPC · JPL
139387	2001 NH_{3}	—	July 13, 2001	Palomar	NEAT	·	3.5 km	MPC · JPL
139388	2001 NQ_{4}	—	July 13, 2001	Palomar	NEAT	·	2.2 km	MPC · JPL
139389	2001 NQ_{7}	—	July 13, 2001	Palomar	NEAT	·	3.0 km	MPC · JPL
139390	2001 NU_{7}	—	July 13, 2001	Palomar	NEAT	·	3.6 km	MPC · JPL
139391	2001 NF_{9}	—	July 13, 2001	Palomar	NEAT	·	2.3 km	MPC · JPL
139392	2001 NB_{10}	—	July 14, 2001	Palomar	NEAT	·	2.2 km	MPC · JPL
139393	2001 ND_{11}	—	July 14, 2001	Haleakala	NEAT	·	2.1 km	MPC · JPL
139394	2001 NU_{12}	—	July 14, 2001	Palomar	NEAT	WIT	1.9 km	MPC · JPL
139395	2001 NB_{17}	—	July 14, 2001	Palomar	NEAT	·	3.5 km	MPC · JPL
139396	2001 NJ_{17}	—	July 14, 2001	Palomar	NEAT	·	4.3 km	MPC · JPL
139397	2001 NS_{17}	—	July 14, 2001	Haleakala	NEAT	·	4.1 km	MPC · JPL
139398	2001 NF_{18}	—	July 10, 2001	Socorro	LINEAR	·	2.1 km	MPC · JPL
139399	2001 NH_{19}	—	July 14, 2001	Palomar	NEAT	·	3.9 km	MPC · JPL
139400	2001 NL_{20}	—	July 13, 2001	Palomar	NEAT	·	3.7 km	MPC · JPL

== 139401–139500 ==
back to top

Designation			Discovery			Properties		Ref
Permanent	Provisional	Named after	Date	Site	Discoverer(s)	Category	Diam.	Ref
139401	2001 NT_{20}	—	July 14, 2001	Palomar	NEAT	·	3.3 km	MPC · JPL
139402	2001 NF_{22}	—	July 14, 2001	Palomar	NEAT	·	3.4 km	MPC · JPL
139403	2001 OG_{1}	—	July 18, 2001	Palomar	NEAT	·	3.2 km	MPC · JPL
139404	2001 OE_{2}	—	July 16, 2001	Anderson Mesa	LONEOS	EUN	2.3 km	MPC · JPL
139405	2001 OG_{2}	—	July 16, 2001	Anderson Mesa	LONEOS	·	4.6 km	MPC · JPL
139406	2001 OD_{4}	—	July 18, 2001	Palomar	NEAT	·	3.8 km	MPC · JPL
139407	2001 OX_{9}	—	July 18, 2001	Palomar	NEAT	MAR	2.3 km	MPC · JPL
139408	2001 OU_{11}	—	July 18, 2001	Haleakala	NEAT	·	3.5 km	MPC · JPL
139409	2001 OC_{13}	—	July 21, 2001	Reedy Creek	J. Broughton	·	3.3 km	MPC · JPL
139410	2001 OR_{14}	—	July 20, 2001	Socorro	LINEAR	·	2.9 km	MPC · JPL
139411	2001 OD_{15}	—	July 18, 2001	Palomar	NEAT	V	1.3 km	MPC · JPL
139412	2001 OX_{15}	—	July 18, 2001	Palomar	NEAT	·	3.6 km	MPC · JPL
139413	2001 OH_{16}	—	July 21, 2001	Palomar	NEAT	·	4.1 km	MPC · JPL
139414	2001 OR_{16}	—	July 20, 2001	San Marcello	A. Boattini, M. Tombelli	GEF	2.0 km	MPC · JPL
139415	2001 OH_{18}	—	July 17, 2001	Haleakala	NEAT	·	2.7 km	MPC · JPL
139416	2001 OL_{18}	—	July 17, 2001	Haleakala	NEAT	·	3.1 km	MPC · JPL
139417	2001 ON_{18}	—	July 17, 2001	Haleakala	NEAT	·	1.6 km	MPC · JPL
139418	2001 OM_{20}	—	July 21, 2001	Anderson Mesa	LONEOS	·	3.1 km	MPC · JPL
139419	2001 OR_{20}	—	July 21, 2001	Anderson Mesa	LONEOS	·	2.4 km	MPC · JPL
139420	2001 OF_{26}	—	July 17, 2001	Palomar	NEAT	MAR	1.9 km	MPC · JPL
139421	2001 OA_{27}	—	July 18, 2001	Palomar	NEAT	·	2.2 km	MPC · JPL
139422	2001 OJ_{28}	—	July 18, 2001	Palomar	NEAT	(5)	2.3 km	MPC · JPL
139423	2001 OQ_{32}	—	July 19, 2001	Palomar	NEAT	·	3.0 km	MPC · JPL
139424	2001 OU_{33}	—	July 19, 2001	Palomar	NEAT	(5)	2.7 km	MPC · JPL
139425	2001 OE_{34}	—	July 19, 2001	Palomar	NEAT	·	2.0 km	MPC · JPL
139426	2001 OM_{34}	—	July 19, 2001	Palomar	NEAT	·	2.4 km	MPC · JPL
139427	2001 OW_{35}	—	July 21, 2001	Haleakala	NEAT	·	2.1 km	MPC · JPL
139428	2001 OO_{38}	—	July 20, 2001	Palomar	NEAT	·	5.5 km	MPC · JPL
139429	2001 OH_{40}	—	July 20, 2001	Palomar	NEAT	·	4.0 km	MPC · JPL
139430	2001 OA_{45}	—	July 16, 2001	Anderson Mesa	LONEOS	EUN	2.6 km	MPC · JPL
139431	2001 OM_{45}	—	July 16, 2001	Anderson Mesa	LONEOS	·	2.8 km	MPC · JPL
139432	2001 OS_{45}	—	July 16, 2001	Anderson Mesa	LONEOS	·	3.6 km	MPC · JPL
139433	2001 ON_{47}	—	July 16, 2001	Anderson Mesa	LONEOS	·	2.9 km	MPC · JPL
139434	2001 OL_{48}	—	July 16, 2001	Haleakala	NEAT	MAR	2.7 km	MPC · JPL
139435	2001 ON_{51}	—	July 21, 2001	Palomar	NEAT	·	2.7 km	MPC · JPL
139436	2001 OT_{51}	—	July 21, 2001	Palomar	NEAT	·	5.0 km	MPC · JPL
139437	2001 ON_{52}	—	July 21, 2001	Palomar	NEAT	EUN	2.2 km	MPC · JPL
139438	2001 OY_{52}	—	July 21, 2001	Palomar	NEAT	·	4.8 km	MPC · JPL
139439	2001 OK_{54}	—	July 21, 2001	Palomar	NEAT	·	4.6 km	MPC · JPL
139440	2001 OW_{55}	—	July 22, 2001	Palomar	NEAT	EUN	3.2 km	MPC · JPL
139441	2001 OY_{56}	—	July 16, 2001	Anderson Mesa	LONEOS	·	5.2 km	MPC · JPL
139442	2001 OQ_{60}	—	July 21, 2001	Haleakala	NEAT	·	1.7 km	MPC · JPL
139443	2001 OT_{60}	—	July 21, 2001	Haleakala	NEAT	·	2.9 km	MPC · JPL
139444	2001 OY_{61}	—	July 21, 2001	Haleakala	NEAT	·	4.5 km	MPC · JPL
139445	2001 OE_{63}	—	July 26, 2001	Desert Beaver	W. K. Y. Yeung	·	4.2 km	MPC · JPL
139446	2001 OU_{63}	—	July 23, 2001	Haleakala	NEAT	JUN	2.6 km	MPC · JPL
139447	2001 OD_{64}	—	July 23, 2001	Haleakala	NEAT	·	3.1 km	MPC · JPL
139448	2001 OL_{64}	—	July 24, 2001	Haleakala	NEAT	EUN	1.7 km	MPC · JPL
139449	2001 OX_{64}	—	July 18, 2001	Palomar	NEAT	·	2.1 km	MPC · JPL
139450	2001 OC_{65}	—	July 22, 2001	Palomar	NEAT	·	3.1 km	MPC · JPL
139451	2001 OE_{65}	—	July 22, 2001	Palomar	NEAT	MAR	2.3 km	MPC · JPL
139452	2001 OK_{66}	—	July 22, 2001	Palomar	NEAT	EMA	5.3 km	MPC · JPL
139453	2001 OT_{67}	—	July 16, 2001	Anderson Mesa	LONEOS	·	2.6 km	MPC · JPL
139454	2001 OD_{69}	—	July 18, 2001	Palomar	NEAT	·	2.8 km	MPC · JPL
139455	2001 OC_{71}	—	July 20, 2001	Palomar	NEAT	·	4.7 km	MPC · JPL
139456	2001 OT_{71}	—	July 21, 2001	Haleakala	NEAT	·	1.4 km	MPC · JPL
139457	2001 OJ_{74}	—	July 19, 2001	Anderson Mesa	LONEOS	EOS	3.3 km	MPC · JPL
139458	2001 OT_{74}	—	July 29, 2001	Socorro	LINEAR	·	8.9 km	MPC · JPL
139459	2001 OY_{74}	—	July 29, 2001	Socorro	LINEAR	·	2.7 km	MPC · JPL
139460	2001 OS_{78}	—	July 26, 2001	Palomar	NEAT	·	3.8 km	MPC · JPL
139461	2001 OC_{80}	—	July 29, 2001	Palomar	NEAT	·	5.0 km	MPC · JPL
139462	2001 OD_{84}	—	July 22, 2001	Siding Spring	R. H. McNaught	TIN	3.8 km	MPC · JPL
139463	2001 OF_{85}	—	July 20, 2001	Anderson Mesa	LONEOS	·	3.5 km	MPC · JPL
139464	2001 OH_{86}	—	July 22, 2001	Anderson Mesa	LONEOS	·	4.4 km	MPC · JPL
139465	2001 OF_{88}	—	July 21, 2001	Haleakala	NEAT	·	2.9 km	MPC · JPL
139466	2001 OU_{88}	—	July 21, 2001	Haleakala	NEAT	·	8.5 km	MPC · JPL
139467	2001 OT_{90}	—	July 25, 2001	Haleakala	NEAT	·	3.4 km	MPC · JPL
139468	2001 OV_{90}	—	July 25, 2001	Haleakala	NEAT	·	1.9 km	MPC · JPL
139469	2001 OF_{91}	—	July 19, 2001	OCA-Anza	White, M., M. Collins	·	2.5 km	MPC · JPL
139470	2001 OK_{91}	—	July 30, 2001	Palomar	NEAT	·	5.7 km	MPC · JPL
139471	2001 OY_{91}	—	July 31, 2001	Palomar	NEAT	·	2.2 km	MPC · JPL
139472	2001 ON_{96}	—	July 24, 2001	Palomar	NEAT	·	3.4 km	MPC · JPL
139473	2001 OK_{99}	—	July 27, 2001	Anderson Mesa	LONEOS	·	1.9 km	MPC · JPL
139474	2001 OW_{100}	—	July 27, 2001	Anderson Mesa	LONEOS	·	2.6 km	MPC · JPL
139475	2001 OT_{102}	—	July 28, 2001	Haleakala	NEAT	GEF	3.0 km	MPC · JPL
139476	2001 OC_{104}	—	July 30, 2001	Socorro	LINEAR	EUN	2.4 km	MPC · JPL
139477	2001 OK_{104}	—	July 30, 2001	Socorro	LINEAR	·	3.4 km	MPC · JPL
139478	2001 OP_{104}	—	July 19, 2001	Mauna Kea	D. J. Tholen	TIR	4.3 km	MPC · JPL
139479	2001 OW_{105}	—	July 29, 2001	Socorro	LINEAR	·	2.3 km	MPC · JPL
139480	2001 PU_{1}	—	August 8, 2001	Haleakala	NEAT	·	2.7 km	MPC · JPL
139481	2001 PB_{3}	—	August 3, 2001	Haleakala	NEAT	(32418)	3.0 km	MPC · JPL
139482	2001 PP_{7}	—	August 7, 2001	Haleakala	NEAT	·	5.4 km	MPC · JPL
139483	2001 PZ_{8}	—	August 11, 2001	Haleakala	NEAT	·	3.4 km	MPC · JPL
139484	2001 PZ_{10}	—	August 8, 2001	Haleakala	NEAT	·	2.0 km	MPC · JPL
139485	2001 PT_{14}	—	August 14, 2001	Ondřejov	P. Kušnirák	·	4.6 km	MPC · JPL
139486	2001 PT_{15}	—	August 9, 2001	Palomar	NEAT	·	1.7 km	MPC · JPL
139487	2001 PA_{20}	—	August 10, 2001	Palomar	NEAT	BRA	3.2 km	MPC · JPL
139488	2001 PU_{21}	—	August 10, 2001	Haleakala	NEAT	·	2.3 km	MPC · JPL
139489	2001 PU_{23}	—	August 11, 2001	Haleakala	NEAT	·	4.9 km	MPC · JPL
139490	2001 PY_{23}	—	August 11, 2001	Haleakala	NEAT	·	3.5 km	MPC · JPL
139491	2001 PF_{26}	—	August 11, 2001	Haleakala	NEAT	·	4.2 km	MPC · JPL
139492	2001 PK_{26}	—	August 11, 2001	Haleakala	NEAT	·	5.4 km	MPC · JPL
139493	2001 PL_{28}	—	August 14, 2001	Haleakala	NEAT	·	2.0 km	MPC · JPL
139494	2001 PE_{31}	—	August 10, 2001	Palomar	NEAT	fast	2.6 km	MPC · JPL
139495	2001 PF_{31}	—	August 10, 2001	Palomar	NEAT	·	2.1 km	MPC · JPL
139496	2001 PJ_{31}	—	August 10, 2001	Palomar	NEAT	EUN	3.1 km	MPC · JPL
139497	2001 PC_{34}	—	August 10, 2001	Haleakala	NEAT	·	5.1 km	MPC · JPL
139498	2001 PJ_{34}	—	August 10, 2001	Palomar	NEAT	·	6.3 km	MPC · JPL
139499	2001 PU_{35}	—	August 11, 2001	Palomar	NEAT	(1547)	2.0 km	MPC · JPL
139500	2001 PO_{36}	—	August 11, 2001	Palomar	NEAT	EUN	2.6 km	MPC · JPL

== 139501–139600 ==
back to top

Designation			Discovery			Properties		Ref
Permanent	Provisional	Named after	Date	Site	Discoverer(s)	Category	Diam.	Ref
139501	2001 PF_{37}	—	August 11, 2001	Palomar	NEAT	·	4.3 km	MPC · JPL
139502	2001 PT_{37}	—	August 11, 2001	Palomar	NEAT	·	2.8 km	MPC · JPL
139503	2001 PB_{39}	—	August 11, 2001	Palomar	NEAT	·	4.4 km	MPC · JPL
139504	2001 PU_{39}	—	August 11, 2001	Palomar	NEAT	·	3.3 km	MPC · JPL
139505	2001 PF_{40}	—	August 11, 2001	Palomar	NEAT	EOS	4.1 km	MPC · JPL
139506	2001 PM_{40}	—	August 11, 2001	Palomar	NEAT	EUN	2.4 km	MPC · JPL
139507	2001 PL_{41}	—	August 11, 2001	Palomar	NEAT	·	5.2 km	MPC · JPL
139508	2001 PW_{42}	—	August 12, 2001	Palomar	NEAT	·	2.4 km	MPC · JPL
139509	2001 PC_{47}	—	August 13, 2001	Bergisch Gladbach	W. Bickel	·	1.5 km	MPC · JPL
139510	2001 PG_{47}	—	August 14, 2001	Bergisch Gladbach	W. Bickel	·	2.4 km	MPC · JPL
139511	2001 PV_{48}	—	August 14, 2001	Palomar	NEAT	·	2.6 km	MPC · JPL
139512	2001 PY_{49}	—	August 15, 2001	Haleakala	NEAT	·	2.5 km	MPC · JPL
139513	2001 PA_{50}	—	August 15, 2001	Haleakala	NEAT	·	2.4 km	MPC · JPL
139514	2001 PM_{50}	—	August 15, 2001	Haleakala	NEAT	·	3.2 km	MPC · JPL
139515	2001 PD_{53}	—	August 14, 2001	Haleakala	NEAT	NEM	4.3 km	MPC · JPL
139516	2001 PA_{57}	—	August 14, 2001	Haleakala	NEAT	·	2.5 km	MPC · JPL
139517	2001 PY_{57}	—	August 14, 2001	Haleakala	NEAT	·	7.3 km	MPC · JPL
139518	2001 PJ_{59}	—	August 14, 2001	Haleakala	NEAT	·	4.0 km	MPC · JPL
139519	2001 PP_{60}	—	August 13, 2001	Haleakala	NEAT	NEM	4.5 km	MPC · JPL
139520	2001 PM_{61}	—	August 13, 2001	Haleakala	NEAT	·	3.2 km	MPC · JPL
139521	2001 PA_{65}	—	August 3, 2001	Palomar	NEAT	·	4.5 km	MPC · JPL
139522	2001 QX_{1}	—	August 16, 2001	Socorro	LINEAR	·	4.1 km	MPC · JPL
139523	2001 QH_{2}	—	August 17, 2001	Reedy Creek	J. Broughton	GEF	2.9 km	MPC · JPL
139524	2001 QJ_{2}	—	August 17, 2001	Reedy Creek	J. Broughton	·	4.4 km	MPC · JPL
139525	2001 QN_{3}	—	August 16, 2001	Socorro	LINEAR	·	3.6 km	MPC · JPL
139526	2001 QU_{4}	—	August 16, 2001	Socorro	LINEAR	·	3.8 km	MPC · JPL
139527	2001 QM_{5}	—	August 16, 2001	Socorro	LINEAR	·	2.9 km	MPC · JPL
139528	2001 QO_{5}	—	August 16, 2001	Socorro	LINEAR	DOR	4.5 km	MPC · JPL
139529	2001 QO_{9}	—	August 16, 2001	Socorro	LINEAR	·	2.9 km	MPC · JPL
139530	2001 QF_{11}	—	August 16, 2001	Socorro	LINEAR	·	2.7 km	MPC · JPL
139531	2001 QD_{12}	—	August 16, 2001	Socorro	LINEAR	·	5.1 km	MPC · JPL
139532	2001 QM_{12}	—	August 16, 2001	Socorro	LINEAR	·	3.8 km	MPC · JPL
139533	2001 QW_{12}	—	August 16, 2001	Socorro	LINEAR	·	5.9 km	MPC · JPL
139534	2001 QS_{18}	—	August 16, 2001	Socorro	LINEAR	·	2.0 km	MPC · JPL
139535	2001 QC_{21}	—	August 16, 2001	Socorro	LINEAR	BRA	3.1 km	MPC · JPL
139536	2001 QY_{24}	—	August 16, 2001	Socorro	LINEAR	·	3.2 km	MPC · JPL
139537	2001 QE_{25}	—	August 16, 2001	Socorro	LINEAR	·	5.1 km	MPC · JPL
139538	2001 QZ_{35}	—	August 16, 2001	Socorro	LINEAR	NEM	4.7 km	MPC · JPL
139539	2001 QJ_{36}	—	August 16, 2001	Socorro	LINEAR	·	4.0 km	MPC · JPL
139540	2001 QY_{37}	—	August 16, 2001	Socorro	LINEAR	·	5.0 km	MPC · JPL
139541	2001 QR_{38}	—	August 16, 2001	Socorro	LINEAR	·	2.5 km	MPC · JPL
139542	2001 QH_{40}	—	August 16, 2001	Socorro	LINEAR	·	3.4 km	MPC · JPL
139543	2001 QL_{45}	—	August 16, 2001	Socorro	LINEAR	·	1.9 km	MPC · JPL
139544	2001 QJ_{46}	—	August 16, 2001	Socorro	LINEAR	·	3.3 km	MPC · JPL
139545	2001 QZ_{48}	—	August 16, 2001	Socorro	LINEAR	(29841)	2.7 km	MPC · JPL
139546	2001 QJ_{50}	—	August 16, 2001	Socorro	LINEAR	·	4.7 km	MPC · JPL
139547	2001 QC_{51}	—	August 16, 2001	Socorro	LINEAR	LEO	5.2 km	MPC · JPL
139548	2001 QG_{55}	—	August 16, 2001	Socorro	LINEAR	·	3.7 km	MPC · JPL
139549	2001 QJ_{56}	—	August 16, 2001	Socorro	LINEAR	·	4.1 km	MPC · JPL
139550	2001 QX_{56}	—	August 16, 2001	Socorro	LINEAR	·	4.1 km	MPC · JPL
139551	2001 QF_{57}	—	August 16, 2001	Socorro	LINEAR	·	3.4 km	MPC · JPL
139552	2001 QK_{58}	—	August 16, 2001	Socorro	LINEAR	·	4.9 km	MPC · JPL
139553	2001 QZ_{58}	—	August 17, 2001	Socorro	LINEAR	WIT	1.8 km	MPC · JPL
139554	2001 QV_{59}	—	August 18, 2001	Socorro	LINEAR	·	2.7 km	MPC · JPL
139555	2001 QP_{67}	—	August 19, 2001	Socorro	LINEAR	·	2.7 km	MPC · JPL
139556	2001 QT_{67}	—	August 19, 2001	Socorro	LINEAR	GEF	2.4 km	MPC · JPL
139557	2001 QF_{68}	—	August 20, 2001	Oakley	Wolfe, C.	·	4.0 km	MPC · JPL
139558	2001 QJ_{68}	—	August 20, 2001	Oakley	Wolfe, C.	EUN	2.8 km	MPC · JPL
139559	2001 QH_{70}	—	August 17, 2001	Socorro	LINEAR	·	2.0 km	MPC · JPL
139560	2001 QL_{71}	—	August 16, 2001	Palomar	NEAT	EUP	7.8 km	MPC · JPL
139561	2001 QF_{72}	—	August 21, 2001	Desert Eagle	W. K. Y. Yeung	·	2.8 km	MPC · JPL
139562	2001 QE_{74}	—	August 16, 2001	Socorro	LINEAR	DOR	5.6 km	MPC · JPL
139563	2001 QJ_{75}	—	August 16, 2001	Socorro	LINEAR	·	2.7 km	MPC · JPL
139564	2001 QC_{76}	—	August 16, 2001	Socorro	LINEAR	·	10 km	MPC · JPL
139565	2001 QL_{77}	—	August 16, 2001	Socorro	LINEAR	·	5.8 km	MPC · JPL
139566	2001 QR_{77}	—	August 16, 2001	Socorro	LINEAR	·	6.2 km	MPC · JPL
139567	2001 QM_{80}	—	August 16, 2001	Socorro	LINEAR	TIR	5.7 km	MPC · JPL
139568	2001 QL_{81}	—	August 17, 2001	Socorro	LINEAR	EOS	4.5 km	MPC · JPL
139569	2001 QU_{84}	—	August 19, 2001	Socorro	LINEAR	·	2.3 km	MPC · JPL
139570	2001 QF_{87}	—	August 17, 2001	Palomar	NEAT	EOS	3.5 km	MPC · JPL
139571	2001 QF_{88}	—	August 21, 2001	Kitt Peak	Spacewatch	·	4.5 km	MPC · JPL
139572	2001 QE_{90}	—	August 16, 2001	Palomar	NEAT	·	7.4 km	MPC · JPL
139573	2001 QH_{90}	—	August 18, 2001	Palomar	NEAT	TIR	5.1 km	MPC · JPL
139574	2001 QR_{90}	—	August 19, 2001	Socorro	LINEAR	·	6.0 km	MPC · JPL
139575	2001 QW_{91}	—	August 19, 2001	Socorro	LINEAR	·	3.6 km	MPC · JPL
139576	2001 QZ_{91}	—	August 19, 2001	Socorro	LINEAR	·	2.0 km	MPC · JPL
139577	2001 QP_{93}	—	August 22, 2001	Socorro	LINEAR	·	7.5 km	MPC · JPL
139578	2001 QP_{94}	—	August 23, 2001	Desert Eagle	W. K. Y. Yeung	KOR	2.6 km	MPC · JPL
139579	2001 QB_{96}	—	August 23, 2001	Kitt Peak	Spacewatch	KOR	2.1 km	MPC · JPL
139580	2001 QZ_{96}	—	August 17, 2001	Socorro	LINEAR	MRX	2.2 km	MPC · JPL
139581	2001 QJ_{103}	—	August 19, 2001	Socorro	LINEAR	·	3.4 km	MPC · JPL
139582	2001 QA_{105}	—	August 22, 2001	Socorro	LINEAR	·	7.3 km	MPC · JPL
139583	2001 QK_{105}	—	August 23, 2001	Socorro	LINEAR	·	2.5 km	MPC · JPL
139584	2001 QX_{105}	—	August 18, 2001	Anderson Mesa	LONEOS	·	2.5 km	MPC · JPL
139585	2001 QB_{110}	—	August 21, 2001	Haleakala	NEAT	·	3.3 km	MPC · JPL
139586	2001 QS_{110}	—	August 24, 2001	Ondřejov	P. Pravec, P. Kušnirák	EUN	2.2 km	MPC · JPL
139587	2001 QO_{111}	—	August 22, 2001	Socorro	LINEAR	H	890 m	MPC · JPL
139588	2001 QS_{111}	—	August 22, 2001	Socorro	LINEAR	V	1.4 km	MPC · JPL
139589	2001 QT_{111}	—	August 22, 2001	Socorro	LINEAR	ADE	3.7 km	MPC · JPL
139590	2001 QJ_{113}	—	August 25, 2001	Socorro	LINEAR	EOS	5.1 km	MPC · JPL
139591	2001 QS_{113}	—	August 25, 2001	Ondřejov	P. Pravec, P. Kušnirák	GEF	1.8 km	MPC · JPL
139592	2001 QK_{114}	—	August 17, 2001	Socorro	LINEAR	·	3.6 km	MPC · JPL
139593	2001 QL_{114}	—	August 17, 2001	Socorro	LINEAR	·	5.8 km	MPC · JPL
139594	2001 QN_{114}	—	August 17, 2001	Socorro	LINEAR	EOS	3.0 km	MPC · JPL
139595	2001 QN_{116}	—	August 17, 2001	Socorro	LINEAR	·	4.9 km	MPC · JPL
139596	2001 QX_{116}	—	August 17, 2001	Socorro	LINEAR	·	4.3 km	MPC · JPL
139597	2001 QD_{118}	—	August 17, 2001	Socorro	LINEAR	·	3.9 km	MPC · JPL
139598	2001 QT_{120}	—	August 19, 2001	Socorro	LINEAR	ADE	5.5 km	MPC · JPL
139599	2001 QJ_{122}	—	August 19, 2001	Socorro	LINEAR	·	5.4 km	MPC · JPL
139600	2001 QL_{122}	—	August 19, 2001	Socorro	LINEAR	·	3.7 km	MPC · JPL

== 139601–139700 ==
back to top

Designation			Discovery			Properties		Ref
Permanent	Provisional	Named after	Date	Site	Discoverer(s)	Category	Diam.	Ref
139601	2001 QY_{124}	—	August 19, 2001	Socorro	LINEAR	MRX	2.1 km	MPC · JPL
139602	2001 QH_{125}	—	August 19, 2001	Socorro	LINEAR	·	4.5 km	MPC · JPL
139603	2001 QR_{125}	—	August 19, 2001	Socorro	LINEAR	AGN	2.4 km	MPC · JPL
139604	2001 QP_{126}	—	August 20, 2001	Socorro	LINEAR	·	3.5 km	MPC · JPL
139605	2001 QH_{127}	—	August 20, 2001	Socorro	LINEAR	·	4.4 km	MPC · JPL
139606	2001 QJ_{127}	—	August 20, 2001	Socorro	LINEAR	·	1.8 km	MPC · JPL
139607	2001 QZ_{127}	—	August 20, 2001	Socorro	LINEAR	GEF	2.0 km	MPC · JPL
139608	2001 QF_{128}	—	August 20, 2001	Socorro	LINEAR	·	4.2 km	MPC · JPL
139609	2001 QB_{129}	—	August 20, 2001	Socorro	LINEAR	·	4.3 km	MPC · JPL
139610	2001 QX_{132}	—	August 20, 2001	Socorro	LINEAR	·	7.0 km	MPC · JPL
139611	2001 QG_{133}	—	August 21, 2001	Socorro	LINEAR	·	2.8 km	MPC · JPL
139612	2001 QZ_{135}	—	August 22, 2001	Socorro	LINEAR	·	4.6 km	MPC · JPL
139613	2001 QG_{136}	—	August 22, 2001	Socorro	LINEAR	·	3.8 km	MPC · JPL
139614	2001 QW_{136}	—	August 22, 2001	Socorro	LINEAR	EOS	3.7 km	MPC · JPL
139615	2001 QX_{136}	—	August 22, 2001	Socorro	LINEAR	EOS	5.3 km	MPC · JPL
139616	2001 QY_{136}	—	August 22, 2001	Socorro	LINEAR	·	2.5 km	MPC · JPL
139617	2001 QS_{137}	—	August 22, 2001	Socorro	LINEAR	·	4.3 km	MPC · JPL
139618	2001 QW_{138}	—	August 22, 2001	Socorro	LINEAR	EUN	3.9 km	MPC · JPL
139619	2001 QD_{141}	—	August 23, 2001	Socorro	LINEAR	·	5.8 km	MPC · JPL
139620	2001 QF_{141}	—	August 23, 2001	Socorro	LINEAR	H	1.1 km	MPC · JPL
139621	2001 QO_{141}	—	August 24, 2001	Socorro	LINEAR	HOF	4.6 km	MPC · JPL
139622	2001 QQ_{142}	—	August 25, 2001	Haleakala	NEAT	APO · PHA	720 m	MPC · JPL
139623	2001 QR_{142}	—	August 24, 2001	Goodricke-Pigott	R. A. Tucker	·	8.4 km	MPC · JPL
139624	2001 QX_{146}	—	August 20, 2001	Palomar	NEAT	·	2.5 km	MPC · JPL
139625	2001 QF_{149}	—	August 21, 2001	Haleakala	NEAT	·	2.2 km	MPC · JPL
139626	2001 QF_{150}	—	August 25, 2001	Palomar	NEAT	·	2.9 km	MPC · JPL
139627	2001 QO_{150}	—	August 22, 2001	Socorro	LINEAR	H	750 m	MPC · JPL
139628	2001 QQ_{151}	—	August 25, 2001	Socorro	LINEAR	·	1.9 km	MPC · JPL
139629	2001 QO_{152}	—	August 26, 2001	Desert Eagle	W. K. Y. Yeung	·	3.1 km	MPC · JPL
139630	2001 QY_{155}	—	August 23, 2001	Anderson Mesa	LONEOS	·	2.6 km	MPC · JPL
139631	2001 QP_{156}	—	August 23, 2001	Anderson Mesa	LONEOS	·	4.0 km	MPC · JPL
139632	2001 QT_{156}	—	August 23, 2001	Anderson Mesa	LONEOS	·	3.9 km	MPC · JPL
139633	2001 QN_{157}	—	August 23, 2001	Anderson Mesa	LONEOS	·	3.6 km	MPC · JPL
139634	2001 QQ_{157}	—	August 23, 2001	Anderson Mesa	LONEOS	·	2.9 km	MPC · JPL
139635	2001 QS_{157}	—	August 23, 2001	Anderson Mesa	LONEOS	PAD	4.1 km	MPC · JPL
139636	2001 QH_{159}	—	August 23, 2001	Anderson Mesa	LONEOS	·	3.8 km	MPC · JPL
139637	2001 QA_{160}	—	August 23, 2001	Anderson Mesa	LONEOS	·	4.4 km	MPC · JPL
139638	2001 QH_{160}	—	August 23, 2001	Anderson Mesa	LONEOS	·	5.7 km	MPC · JPL
139639	2001 QZ_{160}	—	August 23, 2001	Anderson Mesa	LONEOS	KOR	2.5 km	MPC · JPL
139640	2001 QZ_{162}	—	August 23, 2001	Anderson Mesa	LONEOS	·	3.5 km	MPC · JPL
139641	2001 QY_{165}	—	August 24, 2001	Haleakala	NEAT	·	4.2 km	MPC · JPL
139642	2001 QM_{166}	—	August 24, 2001	Haleakala	NEAT	·	5.4 km	MPC · JPL
139643	2001 QL_{167}	—	August 24, 2001	Haleakala	NEAT	·	3.8 km	MPC · JPL
139644	2001 QZ_{168}	—	August 26, 2001	Haleakala	NEAT	·	2.6 km	MPC · JPL
139645	2001 QC_{170}	—	August 23, 2001	Socorro	LINEAR	EOS	5.3 km	MPC · JPL
139646	2001 QC_{171}	—	August 24, 2001	Socorro	LINEAR	·	3.2 km	MPC · JPL
139647	2001 QR_{171}	—	August 25, 2001	Socorro	LINEAR	·	2.4 km	MPC · JPL
139648	2001 QA_{172}	—	August 25, 2001	Socorro	LINEAR	·	2.8 km	MPC · JPL
139649	2001 QT_{174}	—	August 27, 2001	Socorro	LINEAR	·	2.1 km	MPC · JPL
139650	2001 QF_{176}	—	August 23, 2001	Kitt Peak	Spacewatch	·	3.4 km	MPC · JPL
139651	2001 QM_{176}	—	August 23, 2001	Kitt Peak	Spacewatch	·	3.1 km	MPC · JPL
139652	2001 QT_{176}	—	August 26, 2001	Kitt Peak	Spacewatch	·	3.0 km	MPC · JPL
139653	2001 QE_{177}	—	August 26, 2001	Kitt Peak	Spacewatch	·	2.4 km	MPC · JPL
139654	2001 QP_{177}	—	August 25, 2001	Haleakala	NEAT	·	3.3 km	MPC · JPL
139655	2001 QD_{183}	—	August 22, 2001	Bergisch Gladbach	W. Bickel	KOR	2.0 km	MPC · JPL
139656	2001 QW_{183}	—	August 21, 2001	Kitt Peak	Spacewatch	·	3.1 km	MPC · JPL
139657	2001 QC_{184}	—	August 21, 2001	Kitt Peak	Spacewatch	·	2.0 km	MPC · JPL
139658	2001 QY_{184}	—	August 21, 2001	Socorro	LINEAR	·	2.5 km	MPC · JPL
139659	2001 QZ_{184}	—	August 21, 2001	Socorro	LINEAR	·	3.8 km	MPC · JPL
139660	2001 QA_{185}	—	August 21, 2001	Socorro	LINEAR	·	4.2 km	MPC · JPL
139661	2001 QK_{186}	—	August 21, 2001	Kitt Peak	Spacewatch	·	3.0 km	MPC · JPL
139662	2001 QL_{187}	—	August 21, 2001	Haleakala	NEAT	·	2.3 km	MPC · JPL
139663	2001 QX_{187}	—	August 21, 2001	Haleakala	NEAT	·	2.7 km	MPC · JPL
139664	2001 QE_{189}	—	August 22, 2001	Socorro	LINEAR	·	6.0 km	MPC · JPL
139665	2001 QX_{190}	—	August 22, 2001	Socorro	LINEAR	·	4.4 km	MPC · JPL
139666	2001 QG_{192}	—	August 22, 2001	Socorro	LINEAR	·	6.7 km	MPC · JPL
139667	2001 QZ_{193}	—	August 22, 2001	Socorro	LINEAR	·	4.6 km	MPC · JPL
139668	2001 QB_{194}	—	August 22, 2001	Socorro	LINEAR	·	5.8 km	MPC · JPL
139669	2001 QJ_{194}	—	August 22, 2001	Socorro	LINEAR	·	6.7 km	MPC · JPL
139670	2001 QH_{196}	—	August 22, 2001	Kitt Peak	Spacewatch	·	1.3 km	MPC · JPL
139671	2001 QN_{200}	—	August 22, 2001	Palomar	NEAT	H	1.1 km	MPC · JPL
139672	2001 QD_{201}	—	August 22, 2001	Kitt Peak	Spacewatch	·	3.6 km	MPC · JPL
139673	2001 QS_{202}	—	August 23, 2001	Anderson Mesa	LONEOS	·	1.9 km	MPC · JPL
139674	2001 QD_{203}	—	August 23, 2001	Anderson Mesa	LONEOS	·	3.1 km	MPC · JPL
139675	2001 QS_{203}	—	August 23, 2001	Anderson Mesa	LONEOS	·	2.0 km	MPC · JPL
139676	2001 QQ_{204}	—	August 23, 2001	Anderson Mesa	LONEOS	GEF	2.5 km	MPC · JPL
139677	2001 QB_{205}	—	August 23, 2001	Anderson Mesa	LONEOS	·	4.1 km	MPC · JPL
139678	2001 QG_{205}	—	August 23, 2001	Anderson Mesa	LONEOS	·	2.4 km	MPC · JPL
139679	2001 QA_{206}	—	August 23, 2001	Anderson Mesa	LONEOS	·	1.7 km	MPC · JPL
139680	2001 QE_{206}	—	August 23, 2001	Anderson Mesa	LONEOS	EOS	2.8 km	MPC · JPL
139681	2001 QR_{206}	—	August 23, 2001	Anderson Mesa	LONEOS	·	3.1 km	MPC · JPL
139682	2001 QM_{207}	—	August 23, 2001	Anderson Mesa	LONEOS	·	4.4 km	MPC · JPL
139683	2001 QG_{208}	—	August 23, 2001	Anderson Mesa	LONEOS	·	3.8 km	MPC · JPL
139684	2001 QV_{208}	—	August 23, 2001	Anderson Mesa	LONEOS	MRX	1.9 km	MPC · JPL
139685	2001 QN_{210}	—	August 23, 2001	Desert Eagle	W. K. Y. Yeung	GEF	2.6 km	MPC · JPL
139686	2001 QW_{210}	—	August 23, 2001	Anderson Mesa	LONEOS	·	2.9 km	MPC · JPL
139687	2001 QY_{210}	—	August 23, 2001	Anderson Mesa	LONEOS	·	4.2 km	MPC · JPL
139688	2001 QT_{212}	—	August 23, 2001	Anderson Mesa	LONEOS	·	2.9 km	MPC · JPL
139689	2001 QG_{213}	—	August 23, 2001	Anderson Mesa	LONEOS	·	2.0 km	MPC · JPL
139690	2001 QN_{214}	—	August 23, 2001	Anderson Mesa	LONEOS	·	2.2 km	MPC · JPL
139691	2001 QT_{214}	—	August 23, 2001	Anderson Mesa	LONEOS	·	5.4 km	MPC · JPL
139692	2001 QU_{214}	—	August 23, 2001	Anderson Mesa	LONEOS	GEF	2.2 km	MPC · JPL
139693	2001 QG_{215}	—	August 23, 2001	Anderson Mesa	LONEOS	·	3.9 km	MPC · JPL
139694	2001 QJ_{218}	—	August 23, 2001	Anderson Mesa	LONEOS	TEL	2.1 km	MPC · JPL
139695	2001 QY_{218}	—	August 23, 2001	Anderson Mesa	LONEOS	AGN	1.9 km	MPC · JPL
139696	2001 QN_{220}	—	August 23, 2001	Kitt Peak	Spacewatch	·	3.7 km	MPC · JPL
139697	2001 QY_{222}	—	August 24, 2001	Anderson Mesa	LONEOS	·	3.1 km	MPC · JPL
139698	2001 QB_{223}	—	August 24, 2001	Anderson Mesa	LONEOS	·	4.0 km	MPC · JPL
139699	2001 QR_{223}	—	August 24, 2001	Anderson Mesa	LONEOS	MAS	1.2 km	MPC · JPL
139700	2001 QX_{225}	—	August 24, 2001	Anderson Mesa	LONEOS	EOS	3.7 km	MPC · JPL

== 139701–139800 ==
back to top

Designation			Discovery			Properties		Ref
Permanent	Provisional	Named after	Date	Site	Discoverer(s)	Category	Diam.	Ref
139701	2001 QH_{226}	—	August 24, 2001	Anderson Mesa	LONEOS	·	4.2 km	MPC · JPL
139702	2001 QN_{226}	—	August 24, 2001	Anderson Mesa	LONEOS	·	6.3 km	MPC · JPL
139703	2001 QC_{227}	—	August 24, 2001	Anderson Mesa	LONEOS	EUN	2.4 km	MPC · JPL
139704	2001 QK_{227}	—	August 24, 2001	Anderson Mesa	LONEOS	EUN	2.3 km	MPC · JPL
139705	2001 QF_{228}	—	August 24, 2001	Anderson Mesa	LONEOS	GEF	1.6 km	MPC · JPL
139706	2001 QT_{228}	—	August 24, 2001	Anderson Mesa	LONEOS	EOS	3.1 km	MPC · JPL
139707	2001 QD_{229}	—	August 24, 2001	Anderson Mesa	LONEOS	·	2.2 km	MPC · JPL
139708	2001 QX_{230}	—	August 24, 2001	Anderson Mesa	LONEOS	EOS	3.8 km	MPC · JPL
139709	2001 QT_{231}	—	August 24, 2001	Anderson Mesa	LONEOS	·	3.3 km	MPC · JPL
139710	2001 QU_{232}	—	August 24, 2001	Socorro	LINEAR	·	3.3 km	MPC · JPL
139711	2001 QO_{233}	—	August 24, 2001	Socorro	LINEAR	KOR	2.9 km	MPC · JPL
139712	2001 QB_{234}	—	August 24, 2001	Socorro	LINEAR	HOF	4.8 km	MPC · JPL
139713	2001 QH_{235}	—	August 24, 2001	Socorro	LINEAR	·	3.3 km	MPC · JPL
139714	2001 QQ_{237}	—	August 24, 2001	Socorro	LINEAR	·	3.7 km	MPC · JPL
139715	2001 QF_{238}	—	August 24, 2001	Socorro	LINEAR	·	2.1 km	MPC · JPL
139716	2001 QF_{240}	—	August 24, 2001	Socorro	LINEAR	PAD	3.0 km	MPC · JPL
139717	2001 QS_{240}	—	August 24, 2001	Socorro	LINEAR	(12739)	2.5 km	MPC · JPL
139718	2001 QW_{240}	—	August 24, 2001	Socorro	LINEAR	·	3.6 km	MPC · JPL
139719	2001 QH_{241}	—	August 24, 2001	Socorro	LINEAR	·	2.2 km	MPC · JPL
139720	2001 QM_{241}	—	August 24, 2001	Socorro	LINEAR	HYG	4.5 km	MPC · JPL
139721	2001 QA_{243}	—	August 24, 2001	Socorro	LINEAR	KOR	3.3 km	MPC · JPL
139722	2001 QU_{244}	—	August 24, 2001	Socorro	LINEAR	·	3.4 km	MPC · JPL
139723	2001 QB_{246}	—	August 24, 2001	Socorro	LINEAR	BRA	2.2 km	MPC · JPL
139724	2001 QW_{246}	—	August 24, 2001	Socorro	LINEAR	·	4.2 km	MPC · JPL
139725	2001 QE_{249}	—	August 24, 2001	Socorro	LINEAR	EOS	4.9 km	MPC · JPL
139726	2001 QB_{250}	—	August 24, 2001	Haleakala	NEAT	PAD	3.0 km	MPC · JPL
139727	2001 QD_{250}	—	August 24, 2001	Haleakala	NEAT	EUN	3.6 km	MPC · JPL
139728	2001 QE_{250}	—	August 24, 2001	Haleakala	NEAT	·	3.0 km	MPC · JPL
139729	2001 QJ_{250}	—	August 24, 2001	Haleakala	NEAT	·	3.9 km	MPC · JPL
139730	2001 QY_{251}	—	August 25, 2001	Socorro	LINEAR	·	3.8 km	MPC · JPL
139731	2001 QP_{254}	—	August 25, 2001	Anderson Mesa	LONEOS	·	4.9 km	MPC · JPL
139732	2001 QQ_{256}	—	August 25, 2001	Socorro	LINEAR	(5)	3.4 km	MPC · JPL
139733	2001 QG_{257}	—	August 25, 2001	Socorro	LINEAR	DOR	4.3 km	MPC · JPL
139734	2001 QM_{258}	—	August 25, 2001	Socorro	LINEAR	·	4.7 km	MPC · JPL
139735	2001 QK_{259}	—	August 25, 2001	Socorro	LINEAR	EOS	5.3 km	MPC · JPL
139736	2001 QO_{259}	—	August 25, 2001	Socorro	LINEAR	·	3.4 km	MPC · JPL
139737	2001 QU_{260}	—	August 25, 2001	Socorro	LINEAR	·	3.1 km	MPC · JPL
139738	2001 QJ_{261}	—	August 25, 2001	Socorro	LINEAR	JUN	2.9 km	MPC · JPL
139739	2001 QW_{262}	—	August 25, 2001	Kitt Peak	Spacewatch	·	4.3 km	MPC · JPL
139740	2001 QB_{265}	—	August 26, 2001	Socorro	LINEAR	EOS	3.1 km	MPC · JPL
139741	2001 QA_{266}	—	August 20, 2001	Palomar	NEAT	·	4.1 km	MPC · JPL
139742	2001 QJ_{266}	—	August 20, 2001	Socorro	LINEAR	·	2.3 km	MPC · JPL
139743	2001 QS_{266}	—	August 20, 2001	Socorro	LINEAR	·	3.2 km	MPC · JPL
139744	2001 QQ_{268}	—	August 20, 2001	Socorro	LINEAR	·	2.6 km	MPC · JPL
139745	2001 QL_{271}	—	August 19, 2001	Socorro	LINEAR	·	3.0 km	MPC · JPL
139746	2001 QK_{273}	—	August 19, 2001	Socorro	LINEAR	·	4.1 km	MPC · JPL
139747	2001 QZ_{273}	—	August 19, 2001	Socorro	LINEAR	·	3.0 km	MPC · JPL
139748	2001 QQ_{274}	—	August 19, 2001	Socorro	LINEAR	PAD	4.1 km	MPC · JPL
139749	2001 QW_{274}	—	August 19, 2001	Socorro	LINEAR	·	2.7 km	MPC · JPL
139750	2001 QZ_{276}	—	August 19, 2001	Socorro	LINEAR	·	6.0 km	MPC · JPL
139751	2001 QC_{279}	—	August 19, 2001	Socorro	LINEAR	DOR	3.9 km	MPC · JPL
139752	2001 QU_{279}	—	August 19, 2001	Socorro	LINEAR	·	2.4 km	MPC · JPL
139753	2001 QQ_{280}	—	August 19, 2001	Socorro	LINEAR	·	5.4 km	MPC · JPL
139754	2001 QC_{281}	—	August 19, 2001	Socorro	LINEAR	·	4.0 km	MPC · JPL
139755	2001 QF_{281}	—	August 19, 2001	Socorro	LINEAR	·	4.0 km	MPC · JPL
139756	2001 QE_{282}	—	August 19, 2001	Anderson Mesa	LONEOS	·	3.2 km	MPC · JPL
139757	2001 QF_{283}	—	August 18, 2001	Palomar	NEAT	·	2.9 km	MPC · JPL
139758	2001 QR_{283}	—	August 18, 2001	Socorro	LINEAR	·	3.2 km	MPC · JPL
139759	2001 QN_{284}	—	August 18, 2001	Palomar	NEAT	T_{j} (2.98)	9.2 km	MPC · JPL
139760	2001 QW_{285}	—	August 23, 2001	Haleakala	NEAT	·	3.4 km	MPC · JPL
139761	2001 QA_{286}	—	August 28, 2001	Goodricke-Pigott	R. A. Tucker	·	3.7 km	MPC · JPL
139762	2001 QM_{287}	—	August 17, 2001	Socorro	LINEAR	PAD	3.4 km	MPC · JPL
139763	2001 QT_{287}	—	August 17, 2001	Socorro	LINEAR	·	1.9 km	MPC · JPL
139764	2001 QU_{287}	—	August 17, 2001	Socorro	LINEAR	·	3.1 km	MPC · JPL
139765	2001 QN_{288}	—	August 17, 2001	Palomar	NEAT	JUN	2.5 km	MPC · JPL
139766	2001 QB_{290}	—	August 16, 2001	Socorro	LINEAR	AGN	2.2 km	MPC · JPL
139767	2001 QF_{290}	—	August 31, 2001	Palomar	NEAT	·	3.5 km	MPC · JPL
139768	2001 QW_{291}	—	August 16, 2001	Socorro	LINEAR	·	3.1 km	MPC · JPL
139769	2001 QG_{292}	—	August 16, 2001	Socorro	LINEAR	GEF	2.7 km	MPC · JPL
139770	2001 QV_{293}	—	August 22, 2001	Kiso	Ohba, Y.	·	2.9 km	MPC · JPL
139771	2001 QB_{294}	—	August 24, 2001	Anderson Mesa	LONEOS	·	3.4 km	MPC · JPL
139772	2001 QZ_{294}	—	August 24, 2001	Socorro	LINEAR	·	8.1 km	MPC · JPL
139773	2001 QQ_{296}	—	August 24, 2001	Socorro	LINEAR	·	2.3 km	MPC · JPL
139774	2001 QJ_{297}	—	August 24, 2001	Socorro	LINEAR	THM	5.8 km	MPC · JPL
139775	2001 QG_{298}	—	August 19, 2001	Cerro Tololo	M. W. Buie	plutino · moon	209 km	MPC · JPL
139776	2001 QS_{309}	—	August 19, 2001	Cerro Tololo	M. W. Buie	KOR	3.2 km	MPC · JPL
139777	2001 QS_{317}	—	August 20, 2001	Cerro Tololo	M. W. Buie	·	3.6 km	MPC · JPL
139778	2001 QZ_{327}	—	August 20, 2001	Palomar	NEAT	·	5.9 km	MPC · JPL
139779	2001 QR_{328}	—	August 29, 2001	Palomar	NEAT	·	2.7 km	MPC · JPL
139780	2001 QA_{329}	—	August 16, 2001	Socorro	LINEAR	·	2.9 km	MPC · JPL
139781	2001 QG_{329}	—	August 19, 2001	Cerro Tololo	Deep Ecliptic Survey	AGN	1.6 km	MPC · JPL
139782	2001 QR_{329}	—	August 23, 2001	Anderson Mesa	LONEOS	·	2.4 km	MPC · JPL
139783	2001 QW_{330}	—	August 27, 2001	Anderson Mesa	LONEOS	·	3.9 km	MPC · JPL
139784	2001 RW	—	September 8, 2001	Goodricke-Pigott	R. A. Tucker	·	3.3 km	MPC · JPL
139785	2001 RL_{3}	—	September 8, 2001	Anderson Mesa	LONEOS	·	5.3 km	MPC · JPL
139786	2001 RU_{3}	—	September 7, 2001	Socorro	LINEAR	slow	3.0 km	MPC · JPL
139787	2001 RY_{3}	—	September 7, 2001	Socorro	LINEAR	·	3.6 km	MPC · JPL
139788	2001 RA_{4}	—	September 8, 2001	Socorro	LINEAR	·	3.7 km	MPC · JPL
139789	2001 RK_{5}	—	September 8, 2001	Socorro	LINEAR	·	3.4 km	MPC · JPL
139790	2001 RH_{6}	—	September 10, 2001	Badlands	Dyvig, R.	EOS	4.6 km	MPC · JPL
139791	2001 RR_{6}	—	September 10, 2001	Desert Eagle	W. K. Y. Yeung	fast	4.1 km	MPC · JPL
139792	2001 RU_{7}	—	September 8, 2001	Socorro	LINEAR	·	2.5 km	MPC · JPL
139793	2001 RX_{7}	—	September 8, 2001	Socorro	LINEAR	·	3.7 km	MPC · JPL
139794	2001 RJ_{8}	—	September 8, 2001	Socorro	LINEAR	EOS	3.1 km	MPC · JPL
139795	2001 RL_{8}	—	September 8, 2001	Socorro	LINEAR	·	4.4 km	MPC · JPL
139796	2001 RN_{8}	—	September 8, 2001	Socorro	LINEAR	KOR	2.5 km	MPC · JPL
139797	2001 RL_{10}	—	September 10, 2001	Socorro	LINEAR	HNS	2.3 km	MPC · JPL
139798	2001 RO_{10}	—	September 10, 2001	Socorro	LINEAR	H	790 m	MPC · JPL
139799	2001 RL_{11}	—	September 10, 2001	Desert Eagle	W. K. Y. Yeung	T_{j} (2.98) · 3:2	10 km	MPC · JPL
139800	2001 RV_{12}	—	September 8, 2001	Socorro	LINEAR	·	3.7 km	MPC · JPL

== 139801–139900 ==
back to top

Designation			Discovery			Properties		Ref
Permanent	Provisional	Named after	Date	Site	Discoverer(s)	Category	Diam.	Ref
139801	2001 RL_{14}	—	September 10, 2001	Socorro	LINEAR	HOF	2.8 km	MPC · JPL
139802	2001 RD_{15}	—	September 10, 2001	Socorro	LINEAR	HNS	1.9 km	MPC · JPL
139803	2001 RP_{15}	—	September 7, 2001	Socorro	LINEAR	PAD	4.2 km	MPC · JPL
139804	2001 RH_{16}	—	September 10, 2001	Farpoint	G. Hug	615	1.7 km	MPC · JPL
139805	2001 RT_{16}	—	September 11, 2001	Desert Eagle	W. K. Y. Yeung	·	4.6 km	MPC · JPL
139806	2001 RB_{17}	—	September 11, 2001	Desert Eagle	W. K. Y. Yeung	·	2.3 km	MPC · JPL
139807	2001 RJ_{17}	—	September 11, 2001	Desert Eagle	W. K. Y. Yeung	EOS ·	7.9 km	MPC · JPL
139808	2001 RP_{18}	—	September 7, 2001	Socorro	LINEAR	V	1.2 km	MPC · JPL
139809	2001 RC_{20}	—	September 7, 2001	Socorro	LINEAR	·	2.8 km	MPC · JPL
139810	2001 RH_{21}	—	September 7, 2001	Socorro	LINEAR	·	2.9 km	MPC · JPL
139811	2001 RP_{23}	—	September 7, 2001	Socorro	LINEAR	MRX	1.6 km	MPC · JPL
139812	2001 RO_{24}	—	September 7, 2001	Socorro	LINEAR	·	3.2 km	MPC · JPL
139813	2001 RR_{24}	—	September 7, 2001	Socorro	LINEAR	AGN	2.1 km	MPC · JPL
139814	2001 RS_{24}	—	September 7, 2001	Socorro	LINEAR	·	4.7 km	MPC · JPL
139815	2001 RV_{24}	—	September 7, 2001	Socorro	LINEAR	·	5.0 km	MPC · JPL
139816	2001 RY_{24}	—	September 7, 2001	Socorro	LINEAR	AGN	2.2 km	MPC · JPL
139817	2001 RK_{25}	—	September 7, 2001	Socorro	LINEAR	EOS	3.1 km	MPC · JPL
139818	2001 RN_{26}	—	September 7, 2001	Socorro	LINEAR	AGN	1.9 km	MPC · JPL
139819	2001 RG_{27}	—	September 7, 2001	Socorro	LINEAR	·	2.8 km	MPC · JPL
139820	2001 RD_{28}	—	September 7, 2001	Socorro	LINEAR	·	3.2 km	MPC · JPL
139821	2001 RM_{28}	—	September 7, 2001	Socorro	LINEAR	·	4.0 km	MPC · JPL
139822	2001 RY_{28}	—	September 7, 2001	Socorro	LINEAR	·	1.9 km	MPC · JPL
139823	2001 RA_{29}	—	September 7, 2001	Socorro	LINEAR	KOR	2.1 km	MPC · JPL
139824	2001 RP_{30}	—	September 7, 2001	Socorro	LINEAR	AGN	2.2 km	MPC · JPL
139825	2001 RQ_{31}	—	September 8, 2001	Socorro	LINEAR	EUN	2.4 km	MPC · JPL
139826	2001 RJ_{32}	—	September 8, 2001	Socorro	LINEAR	fast	5.5 km	MPC · JPL
139827	2001 RV_{32}	—	September 8, 2001	Socorro	LINEAR	EUN	2.1 km	MPC · JPL
139828	2001 RR_{33}	—	September 8, 2001	Socorro	LINEAR	·	3.3 km	MPC · JPL
139829	2001 RG_{34}	—	September 8, 2001	Socorro	LINEAR	DOR	5.4 km	MPC · JPL
139830	2001 RZ_{34}	—	September 8, 2001	Socorro	LINEAR	·	2.6 km	MPC · JPL
139831	2001 RH_{35}	—	September 8, 2001	Socorro	LINEAR	·	4.3 km	MPC · JPL
139832	2001 RL_{35}	—	September 8, 2001	Socorro	LINEAR	·	3.0 km	MPC · JPL
139833	2001 RT_{35}	—	September 8, 2001	Socorro	LINEAR	·	3.9 km	MPC · JPL
139834	2001 RD_{37}	—	September 8, 2001	Socorro	LINEAR	·	3.2 km	MPC · JPL
139835	2001 RJ_{37}	—	September 8, 2001	Socorro	LINEAR	·	2.4 km	MPC · JPL
139836	2001 RP_{38}	—	September 8, 2001	Socorro	LINEAR	·	3.7 km	MPC · JPL
139837	2001 RH_{39}	—	September 10, 2001	Socorro	LINEAR	·	3.5 km	MPC · JPL
139838	2001 RR_{39}	—	September 10, 2001	Socorro	LINEAR	JUN	2.7 km	MPC · JPL
139839	2001 RO_{41}	—	September 11, 2001	Socorro	LINEAR	AGN	2.0 km	MPC · JPL
139840	2001 RD_{43}	—	September 9, 2001	Palomar	NEAT	·	3.0 km	MPC · JPL
139841	2001 RG_{43}	—	September 11, 2001	Oakley	Oakley	·	2.3 km	MPC · JPL
139842	2001 RV_{43}	—	September 10, 2001	Desert Eagle	W. K. Y. Yeung	EOS	3.5 km	MPC · JPL
139843	2001 RH_{44}	—	September 12, 2001	Palomar	NEAT	(5)	2.9 km	MPC · JPL
139844	2001 RF_{48}	—	September 11, 2001	Desert Eagle	W. K. Y. Yeung	AGN	2.3 km	MPC · JPL
139845	2001 RR_{50}	—	September 11, 2001	Socorro	LINEAR	·	5.6 km	MPC · JPL
139846	2001 RC_{51}	—	September 11, 2001	Socorro	LINEAR	·	3.1 km	MPC · JPL
139847	2001 RN_{53}	—	September 12, 2001	Socorro	LINEAR	·	7.5 km	MPC · JPL
139848	2001 RH_{54}	—	September 12, 2001	Socorro	LINEAR	·	3.3 km	MPC · JPL
139849	2001 RM_{54}	—	September 12, 2001	Socorro	LINEAR	EOS	2.4 km	MPC · JPL
139850	2001 RX_{55}	—	September 12, 2001	Socorro	LINEAR	KOR	3.5 km	MPC · JPL
139851	2001 RC_{57}	—	September 12, 2001	Socorro	LINEAR	·	2.7 km	MPC · JPL
139852	2001 RD_{57}	—	September 12, 2001	Socorro	LINEAR	KOR	2.4 km	MPC · JPL
139853	2001 RQ_{58}	—	September 12, 2001	Socorro	LINEAR	·	3.5 km	MPC · JPL
139854	2001 RP_{59}	—	September 12, 2001	Socorro	LINEAR	·	3.8 km	MPC · JPL
139855	2001 RK_{60}	—	September 12, 2001	Socorro	LINEAR	HOF	4.4 km	MPC · JPL
139856	2001 RM_{60}	—	September 12, 2001	Socorro	LINEAR	·	4.7 km	MPC · JPL
139857	2001 RP_{61}	—	September 12, 2001	Socorro	LINEAR	·	3.3 km	MPC · JPL
139858	2001 RW_{61}	—	September 12, 2001	Socorro	LINEAR	fast	3.1 km	MPC · JPL
139859	2001 RR_{64}	—	September 10, 2001	Socorro	LINEAR	EOS	4.4 km	MPC · JPL
139860	2001 RC_{65}	—	September 10, 2001	Socorro	LINEAR	·	5.0 km	MPC · JPL
139861	2001 RP_{65}	—	September 10, 2001	Socorro	LINEAR	·	3.4 km	MPC · JPL
139862	2001 RQ_{65}	—	September 10, 2001	Socorro	LINEAR	615	2.6 km	MPC · JPL
139863	2001 RJ_{66}	—	September 10, 2001	Socorro	LINEAR	·	4.2 km	MPC · JPL
139864	2001 RW_{66}	—	September 10, 2001	Socorro	LINEAR	·	4.5 km	MPC · JPL
139865	2001 RN_{67}	—	September 10, 2001	Socorro	LINEAR	MRX	1.8 km	MPC · JPL
139866	2001 RU_{67}	—	September 10, 2001	Socorro	LINEAR	·	4.8 km	MPC · JPL
139867	2001 RB_{68}	—	September 10, 2001	Socorro	LINEAR	MRX	2.2 km	MPC · JPL
139868	2001 RX_{69}	—	September 10, 2001	Socorro	LINEAR	HYG	6.5 km	MPC · JPL
139869	2001 RE_{70}	—	September 10, 2001	Socorro	LINEAR	·	2.1 km	MPC · JPL
139870	2001 RP_{73}	—	September 10, 2001	Socorro	LINEAR	·	3.8 km	MPC · JPL
139871	2001 RM_{74}	—	September 10, 2001	Socorro	LINEAR	·	7.2 km	MPC · JPL
139872	2001 RL_{77}	—	September 10, 2001	Socorro	LINEAR	·	7.5 km	MPC · JPL
139873	2001 RD_{78}	—	September 10, 2001	Socorro	LINEAR	DOR	6.5 km	MPC · JPL
139874	2001 RO_{78}	—	September 10, 2001	Socorro	LINEAR	·	5.9 km	MPC · JPL
139875	2001 RQ_{82}	—	September 11, 2001	Anderson Mesa	LONEOS	·	3.7 km	MPC · JPL
139876	2001 RV_{82}	—	September 11, 2001	Anderson Mesa	LONEOS	·	3.7 km	MPC · JPL
139877	2001 RO_{83}	—	September 11, 2001	Anderson Mesa	LONEOS	EOS	3.1 km	MPC · JPL
139878	2001 RT_{84}	—	September 11, 2001	Anderson Mesa	LONEOS	EOS	3.2 km	MPC · JPL
139879	2001 RK_{85}	—	September 11, 2001	Anderson Mesa	LONEOS	·	3.9 km	MPC · JPL
139880	2001 RL_{85}	—	September 11, 2001	Anderson Mesa	LONEOS	·	1.6 km	MPC · JPL
139881	2001 RX_{85}	—	September 11, 2001	Anderson Mesa	LONEOS	·	4.2 km	MPC · JPL
139882	2001 RB_{86}	—	September 11, 2001	Anderson Mesa	LONEOS	EOS	3.3 km	MPC · JPL
139883	2001 RO_{86}	—	September 11, 2001	Anderson Mesa	LONEOS	·	6.0 km	MPC · JPL
139884	2001 RB_{87}	—	September 11, 2001	Anderson Mesa	LONEOS	·	4.3 km	MPC · JPL
139885	2001 RE_{87}	—	September 11, 2001	Anderson Mesa	LONEOS	EOS	3.7 km	MPC · JPL
139886	2001 RG_{88}	—	September 11, 2001	Anderson Mesa	LONEOS	·	3.0 km	MPC · JPL
139887	2001 RS_{88}	—	September 11, 2001	Anderson Mesa	LONEOS	·	3.9 km	MPC · JPL
139888	2001 RC_{89}	—	September 11, 2001	Anderson Mesa	LONEOS	KOR	3.2 km	MPC · JPL
139889	2001 RM_{91}	—	September 11, 2001	Anderson Mesa	LONEOS	·	4.2 km	MPC · JPL
139890	2001 RU_{91}	—	September 11, 2001	Anderson Mesa	LONEOS	KOR	2.4 km	MPC · JPL
139891	2001 RT_{92}	—	September 11, 2001	Anderson Mesa	LONEOS	·	4.5 km	MPC · JPL
139892	2001 RK_{93}	—	September 11, 2001	Anderson Mesa	LONEOS	·	3.3 km	MPC · JPL
139893	2001 RT_{93}	—	September 11, 2001	Anderson Mesa	LONEOS	KOR	4.1 km	MPC · JPL
139894	2001 RS_{94}	—	September 11, 2001	Anderson Mesa	LONEOS	·	6.4 km	MPC · JPL
139895	2001 RX_{94}	—	September 11, 2001	Anderson Mesa	LONEOS	EOS	4.5 km	MPC · JPL
139896	2001 RA_{95}	—	September 11, 2001	Anderson Mesa	LONEOS	TEL	4.2 km	MPC · JPL
139897	2001 RK_{95}	—	September 12, 2001	Socorro	LINEAR	·	4.8 km	MPC · JPL
139898	2001 RN_{95}	—	September 12, 2001	Socorro	LINEAR	·	2.5 km	MPC · JPL
139899	2001 RS_{95}	—	September 11, 2001	Kitt Peak	Spacewatch	AEO	3.6 km	MPC · JPL
139900	2001 RP_{98}	—	September 12, 2001	Kitt Peak	Spacewatch	·	2.2 km	MPC · JPL

== 139901–140000 ==
back to top

Designation			Discovery			Properties		Ref
Permanent	Provisional	Named after	Date	Site	Discoverer(s)	Category	Diam.	Ref
139901	2001 RE_{99}	—	September 12, 2001	Socorro	LINEAR	·	2.9 km	MPC · JPL
139902	2001 RH_{100}	—	September 12, 2001	Socorro	LINEAR	AGN	2.3 km	MPC · JPL
139903	2001 RS_{100}	—	September 12, 2001	Socorro	LINEAR	·	4.5 km	MPC · JPL
139904	2001 RV_{102}	—	September 12, 2001	Socorro	LINEAR	·	3.4 km	MPC · JPL
139905	2001 RA_{104}	—	September 12, 2001	Socorro	LINEAR	·	2.7 km	MPC · JPL
139906	2001 RZ_{104}	—	September 12, 2001	Socorro	LINEAR	·	2.6 km	MPC · JPL
139907	2001 RR_{105}	—	September 12, 2001	Socorro	LINEAR	·	3.6 km	MPC · JPL
139908	2001 RD_{107}	—	September 12, 2001	Socorro	LINEAR	·	4.5 km	MPC · JPL
139909	2001 RH_{107}	—	September 12, 2001	Socorro	LINEAR	·	3.2 km	MPC · JPL
139910	2001 RJ_{108}	—	September 12, 2001	Socorro	LINEAR	·	2.7 km	MPC · JPL
139911	2001 RU_{108}	—	September 12, 2001	Socorro	LINEAR	·	4.5 km	MPC · JPL
139912	2001 RW_{108}	—	September 12, 2001	Socorro	LINEAR	·	2.8 km	MPC · JPL
139913	2001 RB_{109}	—	September 12, 2001	Socorro	LINEAR	·	3.6 km	MPC · JPL
139914	2001 RV_{110}	—	September 12, 2001	Socorro	LINEAR	·	3.5 km	MPC · JPL
139915	2001 RO_{117}	—	September 12, 2001	Socorro	LINEAR	·	5.3 km	MPC · JPL
139916	2001 RB_{118}	—	September 12, 2001	Socorro	LINEAR	KOR	2.9 km	MPC · JPL
139917	2001 RM_{118}	—	September 12, 2001	Socorro	LINEAR	KOR	2.6 km	MPC · JPL
139918	2001 RU_{120}	—	September 12, 2001	Socorro	LINEAR	EOS	3.3 km	MPC · JPL
139919	2001 RF_{121}	—	September 12, 2001	Socorro	LINEAR	EOS	3.4 km	MPC · JPL
139920	2001 RQ_{122}	—	September 12, 2001	Socorro	LINEAR	KOR	2.3 km	MPC · JPL
139921	2001 RR_{123}	—	September 12, 2001	Socorro	LINEAR	·	2.8 km	MPC · JPL
139922	2001 RV_{123}	—	September 12, 2001	Socorro	LINEAR	AST	5.9 km	MPC · JPL
139923	2001 RX_{124}	—	September 12, 2001	Socorro	LINEAR	·	3.1 km	MPC · JPL
139924	2001 RQ_{125}	—	September 12, 2001	Socorro	LINEAR	·	3.5 km	MPC · JPL
139925	2001 RV_{126}	—	September 12, 2001	Socorro	LINEAR	·	5.3 km	MPC · JPL
139926	2001 RO_{128}	—	September 12, 2001	Socorro	LINEAR	(29841)	2.6 km	MPC · JPL
139927	2001 RC_{129}	—	September 12, 2001	Socorro	LINEAR	·	2.6 km	MPC · JPL
139928	2001 RL_{129}	—	September 12, 2001	Socorro	LINEAR	NEM	3.4 km	MPC · JPL
139929	2001 RA_{130}	—	September 12, 2001	Socorro	LINEAR	·	3.3 km	MPC · JPL
139930	2001 RB_{131}	—	September 12, 2001	Socorro	LINEAR	KOR	2.8 km	MPC · JPL
139931	2001 RL_{131}	—	September 12, 2001	Socorro	LINEAR	·	3.8 km	MPC · JPL
139932	2001 RT_{131}	—	September 12, 2001	Socorro	LINEAR	EOS	3.5 km	MPC · JPL
139933	2001 RH_{132}	—	September 12, 2001	Socorro	LINEAR	KOR	3.1 km	MPC · JPL
139934	2001 RT_{132}	—	September 12, 2001	Socorro	LINEAR	·	5.2 km	MPC · JPL
139935	2001 RW_{133}	—	September 12, 2001	Socorro	LINEAR	KOR	2.9 km	MPC · JPL
139936	2001 RX_{133}	—	September 12, 2001	Socorro	LINEAR	·	5.3 km	MPC · JPL
139937	2001 RO_{134}	—	September 12, 2001	Socorro	LINEAR	·	4.1 km	MPC · JPL
139938	2001 RQ_{134}	—	September 12, 2001	Socorro	LINEAR	·	4.3 km	MPC · JPL
139939	2001 RX_{134}	—	September 12, 2001	Socorro	LINEAR	·	3.6 km	MPC · JPL
139940	2001 RR_{135}	—	September 12, 2001	Socorro	LINEAR	GEF	1.8 km	MPC · JPL
139941	2001 RM_{136}	—	September 12, 2001	Socorro	LINEAR	·	3.4 km	MPC · JPL
139942	2001 RN_{136}	—	September 12, 2001	Socorro	LINEAR	·	3.9 km	MPC · JPL
139943	2001 RQ_{136}	—	September 12, 2001	Socorro	LINEAR	·	3.8 km	MPC · JPL
139944	2001 RZ_{136}	—	September 12, 2001	Socorro	LINEAR	·	3.9 km	MPC · JPL
139945	2001 RG_{137}	—	September 12, 2001	Socorro	LINEAR	·	3.0 km	MPC · JPL
139946	2001 RR_{138}	—	September 12, 2001	Socorro	LINEAR	ADE	3.6 km	MPC · JPL
139947	2001 RT_{139}	—	September 12, 2001	Socorro	LINEAR	·	2.9 km	MPC · JPL
139948	2001 RU_{140}	—	September 12, 2001	Socorro	LINEAR	·	2.5 km	MPC · JPL
139949	2001 RL_{141}	—	September 12, 2001	Socorro	LINEAR	·	2.5 km	MPC · JPL
139950	2001 RP_{141}	—	September 12, 2001	Socorro	LINEAR	GEF	2.1 km	MPC · JPL
139951	2001 RA_{142}	—	September 8, 2001	Socorro	LINEAR	·	6.2 km	MPC · JPL
139952	2001 RS_{142}	—	September 11, 2001	Palomar	NEAT	·	6.3 km	MPC · JPL
139953	2001 RF_{145}	—	September 7, 2001	Palomar	NEAT	EOS	4.4 km	MPC · JPL
139954	2001 RW_{145}	—	September 8, 2001	Socorro	LINEAR	·	3.4 km	MPC · JPL
139955	2001 RY_{147}	—	September 10, 2001	Anderson Mesa	LONEOS	EUN	2.4 km	MPC · JPL
139956	2001 RD_{152}	—	September 11, 2001	Anderson Mesa	LONEOS	·	3.5 km	MPC · JPL
139957	2001 RG_{153}	—	September 12, 2001	Socorro	LINEAR	·	2.5 km	MPC · JPL
139958	2001 RL_{153}	—	September 12, 2001	Socorro	LINEAR	·	3.7 km	MPC · JPL
139959	2001 RT_{153}	—	September 14, 2001	Palomar	NEAT	·	2.2 km	MPC · JPL
139960	2001 RR_{154}	—	September 11, 2001	Anderson Mesa	LONEOS	·	2.4 km	MPC · JPL
139961	2001 SR_{3}	—	September 16, 2001	Socorro	LINEAR	·	2.9 km	MPC · JPL
139962	2001 SG_{4}	—	September 17, 2001	Goodricke-Pigott	R. A. Tucker	EOS	4.5 km	MPC · JPL
139963	2001 SD_{6}	—	September 18, 2001	Kitt Peak	Spacewatch	·	3.4 km	MPC · JPL
139964	2001 SH_{7}	—	September 18, 2001	Kitt Peak	Spacewatch	THM	5.8 km	MPC · JPL
139965	2001 SN_{10}	—	September 16, 2001	Socorro	LINEAR	·	3.0 km	MPC · JPL
139966	2001 SQ_{11}	—	September 16, 2001	Socorro	LINEAR	·	3.6 km	MPC · JPL
139967	2001 SF_{12}	—	September 16, 2001	Socorro	LINEAR	·	3.0 km	MPC · JPL
139968	2001 SQ_{12}	—	September 16, 2001	Socorro	LINEAR	·	2.2 km	MPC · JPL
139969	2001 SB_{13}	—	September 16, 2001	Socorro	LINEAR	MRX	1.9 km	MPC · JPL
139970	2001 SM_{13}	—	September 16, 2001	Socorro	LINEAR	NEM	4.1 km	MPC · JPL
139971	2001 SM_{14}	—	September 16, 2001	Socorro	LINEAR	THM	3.8 km	MPC · JPL
139972	2001 SQ_{15}	—	September 16, 2001	Socorro	LINEAR	·	3.5 km	MPC · JPL
139973	2001 SR_{15}	—	September 16, 2001	Socorro	LINEAR	·	2.9 km	MPC · JPL
139974	2001 SU_{16}	—	September 16, 2001	Socorro	LINEAR	·	3.8 km	MPC · JPL
139975	2001 SH_{18}	—	September 16, 2001	Socorro	LINEAR	·	4.3 km	MPC · JPL
139976	2001 SX_{18}	—	September 16, 2001	Socorro	LINEAR	TEL	2.7 km	MPC · JPL
139977	2001 SP_{19}	—	September 16, 2001	Socorro	LINEAR	KOR	2.3 km	MPC · JPL
139978	2001 SO_{20}	—	September 16, 2001	Socorro	LINEAR	·	3.9 km	MPC · JPL
139979	2001 SH_{23}	—	September 16, 2001	Socorro	LINEAR	KOR	1.8 km	MPC · JPL
139980	2001 SS_{23}	—	September 16, 2001	Socorro	LINEAR	·	3.0 km	MPC · JPL
139981	2001 ST_{25}	—	September 16, 2001	Socorro	LINEAR	EOS	2.7 km	MPC · JPL
139982	2001 SM_{26}	—	September 16, 2001	Socorro	LINEAR	·	3.3 km	MPC · JPL
139983	2001 SA_{28}	—	September 16, 2001	Socorro	LINEAR	·	2.8 km	MPC · JPL
139984	2001 SQ_{28}	—	September 16, 2001	Socorro	LINEAR	·	2.1 km	MPC · JPL
139985	2001 SS_{29}	—	September 16, 2001	Socorro	LINEAR	·	3.8 km	MPC · JPL
139986	2001 SE_{31}	—	September 16, 2001	Socorro	LINEAR	KOR	2.4 km	MPC · JPL
139987	2001 SJ_{32}	—	September 16, 2001	Socorro	LINEAR	fast	3.1 km	MPC · JPL
139988	2001 SR_{32}	—	September 16, 2001	Socorro	LINEAR	BRA	2.3 km	MPC · JPL
139989	2001 SJ_{33}	—	September 16, 2001	Socorro	LINEAR	·	2.8 km	MPC · JPL
139990	2001 SS_{33}	—	September 16, 2001	Socorro	LINEAR	·	4.4 km	MPC · JPL
139991	2001 SU_{35}	—	September 16, 2001	Socorro	LINEAR	EOS	3.2 km	MPC · JPL
139992	2001 SD_{36}	—	September 16, 2001	Socorro	LINEAR	·	5.1 km	MPC · JPL
139993	2001 SN_{36}	—	September 16, 2001	Socorro	LINEAR	·	2.6 km	MPC · JPL
139994	2001 SQ_{36}	—	September 16, 2001	Socorro	LINEAR	·	4.9 km	MPC · JPL
139995	2001 ST_{36}	—	September 16, 2001	Socorro	LINEAR	·	4.8 km	MPC · JPL
139996	2001 SC_{37}	—	September 16, 2001	Socorro	LINEAR	·	2.0 km	MPC · JPL
139997	2001 SO_{38}	—	September 16, 2001	Socorro	LINEAR	AGN	1.9 km	MPC · JPL
139998	2001 SK_{39}	—	September 16, 2001	Socorro	LINEAR	·	6.8 km	MPC · JPL
139999	2001 SY_{40}	—	September 16, 2001	Socorro	LINEAR	KOR	2.6 km	MPC · JPL
140000	2001 SN_{41}	—	September 16, 2001	Socorro	LINEAR	KOR	2.6 km	MPC · JPL

back to top

== See also ==
- Meanings of minor-planet names: 139001–140000
