= Meanings of minor-planet names: 206001–207000 =

As minor planet discoveries are confirmed, they are given a permanent number by the IAU's Minor Planet Center (MPC), and the discoverers can then submit names for them, following the IAU's naming conventions. The list below concerns those minor planets in the specified number-range that have received names, and explains the meanings of those names.

Official naming citations of newly named small Solar System bodies are approved and published in a bulletin by IAU's Working Group for Small Bodies Nomenclature (WGSBN). Before May 2021, citations were published in MPC's Minor Planet Circulars for many decades. Recent citations can also be found on the JPL Small-Body Database (SBDB). Until his death in 2016, German astronomer Lutz D. Schmadel compiled these citations into the Dictionary of Minor Planet Names (DMP) and regularly updated the collection.

Based on Paul Herget's The Names of the Minor Planets, Schmadel also researched the unclear origin of numerous asteroids, most of which had been named prior to World War II. This article incorporates text from this source, which is in the public domain: SBDB New namings may only be added to this list below after official publication as the preannouncement of names is condemned. The WGSBN publishes a comprehensive guideline for the naming rules of non-cometary small Solar System bodies.

== 206001–206100 ==
Named minor planet	Provisional	This minor planet was named for...	Ref · Catalog
206015 Carlengelbrecht	2002 PZ_{146}	Carl S. Engelbrecht (b. 1962), an American engineer.	IAU · 206015

== 206101–206200 ==
back to top

Named minor planet	Provisional	This minor planet was named for...	Ref · Catalog
206185 Yip	2002 TB_{323}	Ching-Wa Yip (born 1974), an astronomer from Hong Kong and contributor to the Sloan Digital Sky Survey	JPL · 206185

== 206201–206300 ==
back to top

Named minor planet	Provisional	This minor planet was named for...	Ref · Catalog
206241 Dubois	2002 WM_{28}	Eugène Dubois (1858–1940), Dutch anatomist, surgeon and paleontologist and one of the founders of palaeoanthropology, the study of the formation and the development of the specific characteristics of humans	JPL · 206241
206265 Radian	2002 XP_{115}	The radian is a unit of angle in the International System of Units (SI).	IAU · 206265

== 206301–206400 ==
back to top

Named minor planet	Provisional	This minor planet was named for...	Ref · Catalog
There are no named minor planets in this number range

== 206401–206500 ==
back to top

Named minor planet	Provisional	This minor planet was named for...	Ref · Catalog
There are no named minor planets in this number range

== 206501–206600 ==
back to top

Named minor planet	Provisional	This minor planet was named for...	Ref · Catalog
206574 Illyés	2003 VC	Gyula Illyés (1902–1983), Hungarian poet, novelist and literary translator.	JPL · 206574

== 206601–206700 ==
back to top

Named minor planet	Provisional	This minor planet was named for...	Ref · Catalog
There are no named minor planets in this number range

== 206701–206800 ==
back to top

Named minor planet	Provisional	This minor planet was named for...	Ref · Catalog
There are no named minor planets in this number range

== 206801–206900 ==
back to top

Named minor planet	Provisional	This minor planet was named for...	Ref · Catalog
There are no named minor planets in this number range

== 206901–207000 ==
back to top

Named minor planet	Provisional	This minor planet was named for...	Ref · Catalog
There are no named minor planets in this number range

back to top

Preceded by 205,001–206,000	Meanings of minor-planet names List of minor planets: 206,001–207,000	Succeeded by 207,001–208,000
