= List of minor planets: 206001–207000 =

The following is a partial list of minor planets, running from minor-planet number 206001 through 207000, inclusive. The primary data for this and other partial lists is based on JPL's "Small-Body Orbital Elements" and data available from the Minor Planet Center. Critical list information is also provided by the MPC, unless otherwise specified from Lowell Observatory. A detailed description of the table's columns and additional sources are given on the main page including a complete list of every page in this series, and a statistical break-up on the dynamical classification of minor planets.

Also see the summary list of all named bodies in numerical and alphabetical order, and the corresponding naming citations for the number range of this particular list. New namings may only be added to this list after official publication, as the preannouncement of names is condemned by the Working Group for Small Bodies Nomenclature of the International Astronomical Union.

| Near-Earth obj. | MBA (inner) | MBA (outer) | Centaur |
| Mars-crosser | MBA (middle) | Jupiter trojan | Trans-Neptunian obj. |
| Unclassified |

== 206001–206100 ==
| Designation | | | Discovery | | | Properties | | Ref |
| Permanent | Provisional | Named after | Date | Site | Discoverer(s) | Category | Diam. | Ref |
|---|---|---|---|---|---|---|---|---|
| 206001 | 2002 PK_{33} | — | August 5, 2002 | Campo Imperatore | CINEOS | · | 2.0 km | MPC · JPL |
| 206002 | 2002 PJ_{49} | — | August 10, 2002 | Socorro | LINEAR | 526 · slow | 4.3 km | MPC · JPL |
| 206003 | 2002 PW_{79} | — | August 3, 2002 | Palomar | NEAT | BAR | 2.6 km | MPC · JPL |
| 206004 | 2002 PQ_{89} | — | August 11, 2002 | Socorro | LINEAR | · | 3.9 km | MPC · JPL |
| 206005 | 2002 PZ_{95} | — | August 14, 2002 | Socorro | LINEAR | · | 3.9 km | MPC · JPL |
| 206006 | 2002 PZ_{98} | — | August 14, 2002 | Socorro | LINEAR | · | 3.1 km | MPC · JPL |
| 206007 | 2002 PC_{100} | — | August 14, 2002 | Socorro | LINEAR | · | 3.3 km | MPC · JPL |
| 206008 | 2002 PK_{109} | — | August 13, 2002 | Socorro | LINEAR | · | 3.0 km | MPC · JPL |
| 206009 | 2002 PT_{111} | — | August 14, 2002 | Socorro | LINEAR | · | 1.5 km | MPC · JPL |
| 206010 | 2002 PS_{119} | — | August 13, 2002 | Anderson Mesa | LONEOS | · | 6.2 km | MPC · JPL |
| 206011 | 2002 PK_{125} | — | August 14, 2002 | Socorro | LINEAR | · | 2.4 km | MPC · JPL |
| 206012 | 2002 PA_{133} | — | August 14, 2002 | Socorro | LINEAR | · | 2.6 km | MPC · JPL |
| 206013 | 2002 PW_{136} | — | August 15, 2002 | Kitt Peak | Spacewatch | · | 1.7 km | MPC · JPL |
| 206014 | 2002 PK_{142} | — | August 13, 2002 | Socorro | LINEAR | · | 2.8 km | MPC · JPL |
| 206015 Carlengelbrecht | 2002 PZ_{146} | Carlengelbrecht | August 9, 2002 | Cerro Tololo | M. W. Buie | · | 3.2 km | MPC · JPL |
| 206016 | 2002 PR_{153} | — | August 8, 2002 | Palomar | NEAT | · | 3.2 km | MPC · JPL |
| 206017 | 2002 PY_{156} | — | August 8, 2002 | Palomar | S. F. Hönig | · | 4.4 km | MPC · JPL |
| 206018 | 2002 PF_{162} | — | August 8, 2002 | Palomar | S. F. Hönig | · | 3.4 km | MPC · JPL |
| 206019 | 2002 PM_{162} | — | August 8, 2002 | Palomar | S. F. Hönig | · | 1.7 km | MPC · JPL |
| 206020 | 2002 PF_{166} | — | August 8, 2002 | Palomar | Lowe, A. | MAR | 1.4 km | MPC · JPL |
| 206021 | 2002 PW_{167} | — | August 11, 2002 | Palomar | NEAT | · | 2.0 km | MPC · JPL |
| 206022 | 2002 PG_{172} | — | August 15, 2002 | Palomar | NEAT | · | 1.9 km | MPC · JPL |
| 206023 | 2002 PO_{173} | — | August 15, 2002 | Palomar | NEAT | KOR | 1.7 km | MPC · JPL |
| 206024 | 2002 PX_{179} | — | August 8, 2002 | Palomar | NEAT | · | 2.0 km | MPC · JPL |
| 206025 | 2002 PS_{182} | — | August 8, 2002 | Palomar | NEAT | · | 2.3 km | MPC · JPL |
| 206026 | 2002 PV_{185} | — | August 15, 2002 | Palomar | NEAT | · | 2.1 km | MPC · JPL |
| 206027 | 2002 PA_{186} | — | August 15, 2002 | Palomar | NEAT | NYS | 1.5 km | MPC · JPL |
| 206028 | 2002 QL_{1} | — | August 16, 2002 | Haleakala | NEAT | · | 2.3 km | MPC · JPL |
| 206029 | 2002 QT_{1} | — | August 16, 2002 | Haleakala | NEAT | · | 1.9 km | MPC · JPL |
| 206030 | 2002 QU_{2} | — | August 16, 2002 | Haleakala | NEAT | · | 3.3 km | MPC · JPL |
| 206031 | 2002 QQ_{4} | — | August 16, 2002 | Palomar | NEAT | NEM | 3.8 km | MPC · JPL |
| 206032 | 2002 QS_{4} | — | August 16, 2002 | Palomar | NEAT | · | 2.4 km | MPC · JPL |
| 206033 | 2002 QZ_{4} | — | August 16, 2002 | Palomar | NEAT | · | 2.0 km | MPC · JPL |
| 206034 | 2002 QJ_{5} | — | August 16, 2002 | Palomar | NEAT | · | 3.0 km | MPC · JPL |
| 206035 | 2002 QV_{12} | — | August 26, 2002 | Palomar | NEAT | · | 3.5 km | MPC · JPL |
| 206036 | 2002 QT_{17} | — | August 28, 2002 | Palomar | NEAT | AGN | 1.5 km | MPC · JPL |
| 206037 | 2002 QS_{27} | — | August 28, 2002 | Palomar | NEAT | · | 3.4 km | MPC · JPL |
| 206038 | 2002 QL_{29} | — | August 29, 2002 | Palomar | NEAT | · | 2.6 km | MPC · JPL |
| 206039 | 2002 QF_{33} | — | August 29, 2002 | Palomar | NEAT | ADE | 3.9 km | MPC · JPL |
| 206040 | 2002 QF_{44} | — | August 30, 2002 | Palomar | NEAT | · | 3.6 km | MPC · JPL |
| 206041 | 2002 QU_{61} | — | August 28, 2002 | Palomar | NEAT | · | 2.6 km | MPC · JPL |
| 206042 | 2002 QC_{66} | — | August 17, 2002 | Palomar | NEAT | · | 1.6 km | MPC · JPL |
| 206043 | 2002 QU_{68} | — | August 29, 2002 | Palomar | NEAT | · | 2.0 km | MPC · JPL |
| 206044 | 2002 QJ_{72} | — | August 17, 2002 | Palomar | NEAT | · | 2.1 km | MPC · JPL |
| 206045 | 2002 QX_{72} | — | August 18, 2002 | Palomar | NEAT | 615 | 1.8 km | MPC · JPL |
| 206046 | 2002 QR_{74} | — | August 18, 2002 | Palomar | NEAT | · | 1.9 km | MPC · JPL |
| 206047 | 2002 QD_{77} | — | August 17, 2002 | Palomar | NEAT | AEO | 1.3 km | MPC · JPL |
| 206048 | 2002 QR_{77} | — | August 30, 2002 | Palomar | NEAT | · | 2.3 km | MPC · JPL |
| 206049 | 2002 QB_{82} | — | August 17, 2002 | Palomar | NEAT | HOF | 3.5 km | MPC · JPL |
| 206050 | 2002 QW_{84} | — | August 16, 2002 | Palomar | NEAT | · | 2.9 km | MPC · JPL |
| 206051 | 2002 QQ_{85} | — | August 16, 2002 | Palomar | NEAT | · | 2.3 km | MPC · JPL |
| 206052 | 2002 QU_{85} | — | August 17, 2002 | Palomar | NEAT | · | 2.2 km | MPC · JPL |
| 206053 | 2002 QH_{88} | — | August 27, 2002 | Palomar | NEAT | · | 2.2 km | MPC · JPL |
| 206054 | 2002 QF_{90} | — | August 27, 2002 | Palomar | NEAT | GEF | 2.1 km | MPC · JPL |
| 206055 | 2002 QK_{95} | — | August 18, 2002 | Palomar | NEAT | · | 1.9 km | MPC · JPL |
| 206056 | 2002 QC_{97} | — | August 18, 2002 | Palomar | NEAT | · | 2.0 km | MPC · JPL |
| 206057 | 2002 QB_{100} | — | August 18, 2002 | Palomar | NEAT | · | 2.3 km | MPC · JPL |
| 206058 | 2002 QJ_{108} | — | August 17, 2002 | Palomar | NEAT | · | 1.9 km | MPC · JPL |
| 206059 | 2002 QQ_{108} | — | August 26, 2002 | Palomar | NEAT | · | 3.9 km | MPC · JPL |
| 206060 | 2002 QP_{109} | — | August 17, 2002 | Palomar | NEAT | · | 2.3 km | MPC · JPL |
| 206061 | 2002 QL_{114} | — | August 28, 2002 | Palomar | NEAT | WIT | 1.3 km | MPC · JPL |
| 206062 | 2002 QB_{115} | — | August 16, 2002 | Palomar | NEAT | · | 2.9 km | MPC · JPL |
| 206063 | 2002 QH_{116} | — | August 18, 2002 | Palomar | NEAT | · | 2.3 km | MPC · JPL |
| 206064 | 2002 QD_{119} | — | August 29, 2002 | Palomar | NEAT | · | 2.5 km | MPC · JPL |
| 206065 | 2002 QF_{120} | — | August 30, 2002 | Palomar | NEAT | · | 2.7 km | MPC · JPL |
| 206066 | 2002 QK_{121} | — | August 17, 2002 | Palomar | NEAT | · | 2.5 km | MPC · JPL |
| 206067 | 2002 QM_{122} | — | August 18, 2002 | Palomar | NEAT | · | 1.8 km | MPC · JPL |
| 206068 | 2002 RM_{3} | — | September 4, 2002 | Anderson Mesa | LONEOS | NYS | 2.1 km | MPC · JPL |
| 206069 | 2002 RM_{4} | — | September 3, 2002 | Palomar | NEAT | · | 2.8 km | MPC · JPL |
| 206070 | 2002 RF_{8} | — | September 3, 2002 | Haleakala | NEAT | · | 2.1 km | MPC · JPL |
| 206071 | 2002 RS_{10} | — | September 4, 2002 | Palomar | NEAT | AGN | 1.8 km | MPC · JPL |
| 206072 | 2002 RD_{23} | — | September 4, 2002 | Anderson Mesa | LONEOS | AGN | 1.5 km | MPC · JPL |
| 206073 | 2002 RP_{29} | — | September 3, 2002 | Haleakala | NEAT | H | 830 m | MPC · JPL |
| 206074 | 2002 RV_{45} | — | September 5, 2002 | Socorro | LINEAR | · | 2.9 km | MPC · JPL |
| 206075 | 2002 RE_{46} | — | September 5, 2002 | Socorro | LINEAR | · | 4.8 km | MPC · JPL |
| 206076 | 2002 RW_{46} | — | September 5, 2002 | Socorro | LINEAR | · | 3.1 km | MPC · JPL |
| 206077 | 2002 RQ_{56} | — | September 5, 2002 | Anderson Mesa | LONEOS | · | 2.9 km | MPC · JPL |
| 206078 | 2002 RM_{60} | — | September 5, 2002 | Socorro | LINEAR | · | 5.0 km | MPC · JPL |
| 206079 | 2002 RU_{66} | — | September 3, 2002 | Palomar | NEAT | · | 4.0 km | MPC · JPL |
| 206080 | 2002 RG_{68} | — | September 4, 2002 | Anderson Mesa | LONEOS | · | 3.8 km | MPC · JPL |
| 206081 | 2002 RQ_{72} | — | September 5, 2002 | Socorro | LINEAR | · | 2.6 km | MPC · JPL |
| 206082 | 2002 RJ_{75} | — | September 5, 2002 | Socorro | LINEAR | PAD | 3.9 km | MPC · JPL |
| 206083 | 2002 RK_{81} | — | September 5, 2002 | Socorro | LINEAR | AGN | 1.8 km | MPC · JPL |
| 206084 | 2002 RT_{81} | — | September 5, 2002 | Socorro | LINEAR | (1547) | 2.3 km | MPC · JPL |
| 206085 | 2002 RG_{93} | — | September 5, 2002 | Anderson Mesa | LONEOS | · | 7.7 km | MPC · JPL |
| 206086 | 2002 RH_{124} | — | September 9, 2002 | Haleakala | NEAT | · | 3.6 km | MPC · JPL |
| 206087 | 2002 RN_{132} | — | September 11, 2002 | Haleakala | NEAT | · | 2.6 km | MPC · JPL |
| 206088 | 2002 RV_{133} | — | September 10, 2002 | Palomar | NEAT | GEF | 2.4 km | MPC · JPL |
| 206089 | 2002 RR_{138} | — | September 10, 2002 | Palomar | NEAT | EUN | 1.8 km | MPC · JPL |
| 206090 | 2002 RX_{138} | — | September 10, 2002 | Palomar | NEAT | GEF | 1.9 km | MPC · JPL |
| 206091 | 2002 RY_{140} | — | September 10, 2002 | Palomar | NEAT | GEF | 1.7 km | MPC · JPL |
| 206092 | 2002 RZ_{142} | — | September 11, 2002 | Palomar | NEAT | · | 3.6 km | MPC · JPL |
| 206093 | 2002 RW_{150} | — | September 12, 2002 | Palomar | NEAT | · | 2.8 km | MPC · JPL |
| 206094 | 2002 RF_{155} | — | September 11, 2002 | Palomar | NEAT | · | 3.7 km | MPC · JPL |
| 206095 | 2002 RG_{155} | — | September 11, 2002 | Palomar | NEAT | HOF | 3.6 km | MPC · JPL |
| 206096 | 2002 RD_{158} | — | September 11, 2002 | Palomar | NEAT | PAD | 3.6 km | MPC · JPL |
| 206097 | 2002 RX_{162} | — | September 12, 2002 | Palomar | NEAT | · | 3.2 km | MPC · JPL |
| 206098 | 2002 RU_{171} | — | September 13, 2002 | Kitt Peak | Spacewatch | DOR | 4.0 km | MPC · JPL |
| 206099 | 2002 RT_{177} | — | September 13, 2002 | Palomar | NEAT | · | 4.1 km | MPC · JPL |
| 206100 | 2002 RT_{180} | — | September 14, 2002 | Haleakala | NEAT | · | 2.3 km | MPC · JPL |

== 206101–206200 ==
back to top

| Designation | | | Discovery | | | Properties | | Ref |
| Permanent | Provisional | Named after | Date | Site | Discoverer(s) | Category | Diam. | Ref |
|---|---|---|---|---|---|---|---|---|
| 206101 | 2002 RW_{180} | — | September 11, 2002 | Haleakala | NEAT | · | 4.7 km | MPC · JPL |
| 206102 | 2002 RF_{185} | — | September 12, 2002 | Palomar | NEAT | EOS | 3.2 km | MPC · JPL |
| 206103 | 2002 RD_{190} | — | September 14, 2002 | Palomar | NEAT | · | 3.2 km | MPC · JPL |
| 206104 | 2002 RG_{190} | — | September 14, 2002 | Palomar | NEAT | · | 2.6 km | MPC · JPL |
| 206105 | 2002 RK_{191} | — | September 15, 2002 | Palomar | NEAT | H | 1.1 km | MPC · JPL |
| 206106 | 2002 RN_{192} | — | September 12, 2002 | Palomar | NEAT | KOR | 4.0 km | MPC · JPL |
| 206107 | 2002 RD_{208} | — | September 12, 2002 | Palomar | NEAT | · | 2.0 km | MPC · JPL |
| 206108 | 2002 RC_{209} | — | September 14, 2002 | Palomar | NEAT | · | 2.4 km | MPC · JPL |
| 206109 | 2002 RN_{214} | — | September 13, 2002 | Socorro | LINEAR | · | 1.6 km | MPC · JPL |
| 206110 | 2002 RX_{214} | — | September 13, 2002 | Socorro | LINEAR | · | 2.8 km | MPC · JPL |
| 206111 | 2002 RC_{221} | — | September 15, 2002 | Palomar | NEAT | AGN | 1.6 km | MPC · JPL |
| 206112 | 2002 RK_{233} | — | September 14, 2002 | Palomar | R. Matson | · | 2.0 km | MPC · JPL |
| 206113 | 2002 RK_{235} | — | September 14, 2002 | Palomar | R. Matson | · | 3.5 km | MPC · JPL |
| 206114 | 2002 RJ_{237} | — | September 15, 2002 | Palomar | R. Matson | AGN | 1.3 km | MPC · JPL |
| 206115 | 2002 RA_{243} | — | September 14, 2002 | Palomar | NEAT | · | 2.6 km | MPC · JPL |
| 206116 | 2002 RO_{246} | — | September 15, 2002 | Palomar | NEAT | HNS | 1.5 km | MPC · JPL |
| 206117 | 2002 RS_{248} | — | September 14, 2002 | Palomar | NEAT | AST | 2.9 km | MPC · JPL |
| 206118 | 2002 RJ_{254} | — | September 14, 2002 | Palomar | NEAT | KOR | 1.6 km | MPC · JPL |
| 206119 | 2002 RM_{255} | — | September 13, 2002 | Palomar | NEAT | HYG | 3.6 km | MPC · JPL |
| 206120 | 2002 RH_{270} | — | September 14, 2002 | Palomar | NEAT | · | 1.8 km | MPC · JPL |
| 206121 | 2002 RR_{274} | — | September 4, 2002 | Palomar | NEAT | · | 1.7 km | MPC · JPL |
| 206122 | 2002 RV_{276} | — | September 14, 2002 | Palomar | NEAT | · | 1.9 km | MPC · JPL |
| 206123 | 2002 RL_{279} | — | September 14, 2002 | Palomar | NEAT | · | 2.4 km | MPC · JPL |
| 206124 | 2002 SH_{4} | — | September 27, 2002 | Palomar | NEAT | H | 700 m | MPC · JPL |
| 206125 | 2002 SM_{8} | — | September 27, 2002 | Palomar | NEAT | · | 2.3 km | MPC · JPL |
| 206126 | 2002 SK_{9} | — | September 27, 2002 | Palomar | NEAT | AGN | 1.7 km | MPC · JPL |
| 206127 | 2002 SW_{10} | — | September 27, 2002 | Palomar | NEAT | · | 3.0 km | MPC · JPL |
| 206128 | 2002 SQ_{40} | — | September 30, 2002 | Haleakala | NEAT | · | 2.7 km | MPC · JPL |
| 206129 | 2002 SS_{45} | — | September 29, 2002 | Kitt Peak | Spacewatch | · | 3.2 km | MPC · JPL |
| 206130 | 2002 SJ_{52} | — | September 17, 2002 | Palomar | NEAT | EOS | 3.6 km | MPC · JPL |
| 206131 | 2002 SU_{54} | — | September 30, 2002 | Socorro | LINEAR | · | 3.3 km | MPC · JPL |
| 206132 | 2002 SY_{60} | — | September 16, 2002 | Palomar | NEAT | HOF | 4.8 km | MPC · JPL |
| 206133 | 2002 SC_{64} | — | September 28, 2002 | Palomar | NEAT | H | 730 m | MPC · JPL |
| 206134 | 2002 SP_{70} | — | September 26, 2002 | Palomar | NEAT | AGN | 1.6 km | MPC · JPL |
| 206135 | 2002 TA_{2} | — | October 1, 2002 | Anderson Mesa | LONEOS | · | 3.1 km | MPC · JPL |
| 206136 | 2002 TB_{10} | — | October 1, 2002 | Socorro | LINEAR | · | 4.8 km | MPC · JPL |
| 206137 | 2002 TS_{12} | — | October 1, 2002 | Anderson Mesa | LONEOS | · | 3.0 km | MPC · JPL |
| 206138 | 2002 TU_{17} | — | October 2, 2002 | Socorro | LINEAR | · | 2.7 km | MPC · JPL |
| 206139 | 2002 TW_{42} | — | October 2, 2002 | Socorro | LINEAR | EOS · | 6.4 km | MPC · JPL |
| 206140 | 2002 TV_{48} | — | October 2, 2002 | Socorro | LINEAR | · | 5.7 km | MPC · JPL |
| 206141 | 2002 TA_{59} | — | October 4, 2002 | Fountain Hills | C. W. Juels, P. R. Holvorcem | EOS | 3.8 km | MPC · JPL |
| 206142 | 2002 TA_{66} | — | October 4, 2002 | Campo Imperatore | CINEOS | · | 2.0 km | MPC · JPL |
| 206143 | 2002 TJ_{84} | — | October 2, 2002 | Haleakala | NEAT | · | 4.2 km | MPC · JPL |
| 206144 | 2002 TG_{92} | — | October 3, 2002 | Socorro | LINEAR | · | 2.1 km | MPC · JPL |
| 206145 | 2002 TE_{94} | — | October 3, 2002 | Socorro | LINEAR | · | 2.8 km | MPC · JPL |
| 206146 | 2002 TL_{97} | — | October 2, 2002 | Socorro | LINEAR | KOR | 1.6 km | MPC · JPL |
| 206147 | 2002 TK_{98} | — | October 3, 2002 | Socorro | LINEAR | · | 2.7 km | MPC · JPL |
| 206148 | 2002 TZ_{102} | — | October 4, 2002 | Socorro | LINEAR | · | 5.2 km | MPC · JPL |
| 206149 | 2002 TF_{119} | — | October 3, 2002 | Palomar | NEAT | · | 3.2 km | MPC · JPL |
| 206150 | 2002 TJ_{124} | — | October 4, 2002 | Palomar | NEAT | · | 1.9 km | MPC · JPL |
| 206151 | 2002 TN_{127} | — | October 4, 2002 | Palomar | NEAT | · | 2.8 km | MPC · JPL |
| 206152 | 2002 TE_{129} | — | October 4, 2002 | Palomar | NEAT | GEF | 2.5 km | MPC · JPL |
| 206153 | 2002 TU_{136} | — | October 4, 2002 | Anderson Mesa | LONEOS | · | 3.5 km | MPC · JPL |
| 206154 | 2002 TW_{143} | — | October 4, 2002 | Socorro | LINEAR | · | 3.7 km | MPC · JPL |
| 206155 | 2002 TG_{158} | — | October 5, 2002 | Palomar | NEAT | · | 2.7 km | MPC · JPL |
| 206156 | 2002 TX_{170} | — | October 3, 2002 | Palomar | NEAT | · | 4.8 km | MPC · JPL |
| 206157 | 2002 TP_{176} | — | October 5, 2002 | Socorro | LINEAR | EOS | 3.0 km | MPC · JPL |
| 206158 | 2002 TT_{180} | — | October 14, 2002 | Socorro | LINEAR | · | 4.3 km | MPC · JPL |
| 206159 | 2002 TU_{185} | — | October 4, 2002 | Socorro | LINEAR | · | 2.7 km | MPC · JPL |
| 206160 | 2002 TB_{187} | — | October 4, 2002 | Socorro | LINEAR | · | 4.0 km | MPC · JPL |
| 206161 | 2002 TF_{192} | — | October 5, 2002 | Anderson Mesa | LONEOS | slow | 5.0 km | MPC · JPL |
| 206162 | 2002 TV_{214} | — | October 4, 2002 | Socorro | LINEAR | · | 6.6 km | MPC · JPL |
| 206163 | 2002 TW_{215} | — | October 5, 2002 | Socorro | LINEAR | · | 3.3 km | MPC · JPL |
| 206164 | 2002 TH_{222} | — | October 7, 2002 | Socorro | LINEAR | · | 3.1 km | MPC · JPL |
| 206165 | 2002 TE_{233} | — | October 6, 2002 | Socorro | LINEAR | · | 6.4 km | MPC · JPL |
| 206166 | 2002 TA_{242} | — | October 9, 2002 | Anderson Mesa | LONEOS | · | 4.7 km | MPC · JPL |
| 206167 | 2002 TS_{242} | — | October 9, 2002 | Socorro | LINEAR | · | 3.1 km | MPC · JPL |
| 206168 | 2002 TC_{250} | — | October 7, 2002 | Socorro | LINEAR | · | 1.9 km | MPC · JPL |
| 206169 | 2002 TH_{250} | — | October 7, 2002 | Socorro | LINEAR | · | 2.2 km | MPC · JPL |
| 206170 | 2002 TP_{252} | — | October 8, 2002 | Anderson Mesa | LONEOS | · | 3.5 km | MPC · JPL |
| 206171 | 2002 TQ_{258} | — | October 9, 2002 | Socorro | LINEAR | · | 2.9 km | MPC · JPL |
| 206172 | 2002 TY_{262} | — | October 10, 2002 | Palomar | NEAT | KOR | 1.8 km | MPC · JPL |
| 206173 | 2002 TT_{272} | — | October 9, 2002 | Socorro | LINEAR | · | 3.4 km | MPC · JPL |
| 206174 | 2002 TD_{278} | — | October 10, 2002 | Socorro | LINEAR | EOS | 3.2 km | MPC · JPL |
| 206175 | 2002 TN_{293} | — | October 10, 2002 | Socorro | LINEAR | · | 6.4 km | MPC · JPL |
| 206176 | 2002 TK_{294} | — | October 9, 2002 | Socorro | LINEAR | H | 1.1 km | MPC · JPL |
| 206177 | 2002 TB_{295} | — | October 13, 2002 | Palomar | NEAT | · | 4.2 km | MPC · JPL |
| 206178 | 2002 TF_{295} | — | October 13, 2002 | Palomar | NEAT | · | 5.0 km | MPC · JPL |
| 206179 | 2002 TZ_{295} | — | October 13, 2002 | Palomar | NEAT | · | 4.0 km | MPC · JPL |
| 206180 | 2002 TY_{304} | — | October 4, 2002 | Apache Point | SDSS | · | 2.9 km | MPC · JPL |
| 206181 | 2002 TN_{312} | — | October 4, 2002 | Apache Point | SDSS | · | 3.1 km | MPC · JPL |
| 206182 | 2002 TM_{315} | — | October 4, 2002 | Apache Point | SDSS | · | 5.9 km | MPC · JPL |
| 206183 | 2002 TM_{316} | — | October 4, 2002 | Apache Point | SDSS | · | 5.9 km | MPC · JPL |
| 206184 | 2002 TW_{317} | — | October 5, 2002 | Apache Point | SDSS | · | 2.2 km | MPC · JPL |
| 206185 Yip | 2002 TB_{323} | Yip | October 5, 2002 | Apache Point | SDSS | · | 2.4 km | MPC · JPL |
| 206186 | 2002 TS_{329} | — | October 5, 2002 | Apache Point | SDSS | AGN | 1.3 km | MPC · JPL |
| 206187 | 2002 TB_{361} | — | October 10, 2002 | Apache Point | SDSS | KOR | 1.6 km | MPC · JPL |
| 206188 | 2002 TO_{375} | — | October 2, 2002 | Socorro | LINEAR | · | 3.7 km | MPC · JPL |
| 206189 | 2002 TB_{376} | — | October 5, 2002 | Socorro | LINEAR | · | 3.5 km | MPC · JPL |
| 206190 | 2002 TH_{376} | — | October 3, 2002 | Socorro | LINEAR | AGN | 1.7 km | MPC · JPL |
| 206191 | 2002 TE_{378} | — | October 15, 2002 | Palomar | NEAT | · | 4.4 km | MPC · JPL |
| 206192 | 2002 UR_{2} | — | October 28, 2002 | Socorro | LINEAR | EUP | 5.2 km | MPC · JPL |
| 206193 | 2002 UH_{7} | — | October 28, 2002 | Palomar | NEAT | · | 3.9 km | MPC · JPL |
| 206194 | 2002 UN_{7} | — | October 28, 2002 | Palomar | NEAT | · | 3.4 km | MPC · JPL |
| 206195 | 2002 UW_{8} | — | October 28, 2002 | Palomar | NEAT | · | 6.2 km | MPC · JPL |
| 206196 | 2002 UW_{11} | — | October 28, 2002 | Socorro | LINEAR | · | 5.7 km | MPC · JPL |
| 206197 | 2002 UQ_{18} | — | October 30, 2002 | Palomar | NEAT | (3460) | 3.5 km | MPC · JPL |
| 206198 | 2002 UE_{20} | — | October 28, 2002 | Palomar | NEAT | HYG | 4.4 km | MPC · JPL |
| 206199 | 2002 UB_{22} | — | October 30, 2002 | Haleakala | NEAT | TIR | 4.6 km | MPC · JPL |
| 206200 | 2002 UK_{23} | — | October 31, 2002 | Socorro | LINEAR | EUP | 8.3 km | MPC · JPL |

== 206201–206300 ==
back to top

| Designation | | | Discovery | | | Properties | | Ref |
| Permanent | Provisional | Named after | Date | Site | Discoverer(s) | Category | Diam. | Ref |
|---|---|---|---|---|---|---|---|---|
| 206201 | 2002 UN_{25} | — | October 30, 2002 | Haleakala | NEAT | · | 1.4 km | MPC · JPL |
| 206202 | 2002 UU_{34} | — | October 31, 2002 | Anderson Mesa | LONEOS | · | 3.1 km | MPC · JPL |
| 206203 | 2002 UR_{36} | — | October 31, 2002 | Anderson Mesa | LONEOS | THM | 4.1 km | MPC · JPL |
| 206204 | 2002 UN_{37} | — | October 31, 2002 | Palomar | NEAT | · | 5.3 km | MPC · JPL |
| 206205 | 2002 UF_{40} | — | October 31, 2002 | Socorro | LINEAR | EOS | 3.3 km | MPC · JPL |
| 206206 | 2002 US_{40} | — | October 31, 2002 | Socorro | LINEAR | · | 3.6 km | MPC · JPL |
| 206207 | 2002 UY_{72} | — | October 20, 2002 | Palomar | NEAT | · | 4.9 km | MPC · JPL |
| 206208 | 2002 UV_{75} | — | October 31, 2002 | Palomar | NEAT | · | 2.0 km | MPC · JPL |
| 206209 | 2002 VW_{9} | — | November 1, 2002 | Palomar | NEAT | · | 3.1 km | MPC · JPL |
| 206210 | 2002 VX_{15} | — | November 5, 2002 | Socorro | LINEAR | · | 4.6 km | MPC · JPL |
| 206211 | 2002 VG_{27} | — | November 5, 2002 | Socorro | LINEAR | · | 4.2 km | MPC · JPL |
| 206212 | 2002 VS_{34} | — | November 5, 2002 | Socorro | LINEAR | H | 1.1 km | MPC · JPL |
| 206213 | 2002 VX_{34} | — | November 5, 2002 | Socorro | LINEAR | LIX | 6.2 km | MPC · JPL |
| 206214 | 2002 VN_{38} | — | November 5, 2002 | Socorro | LINEAR | EOS | 3.4 km | MPC · JPL |
| 206215 | 2002 VB_{39} | — | November 5, 2002 | Socorro | LINEAR | · | 4.6 km | MPC · JPL |
| 206216 | 2002 VD_{40} | — | November 8, 2002 | Kingsnake | J. V. McClusky | · | 3.8 km | MPC · JPL |
| 206217 | 2002 VD_{42} | — | November 5, 2002 | Palomar | NEAT | · | 3.4 km | MPC · JPL |
| 206218 | 2002 VF_{44} | — | November 4, 2002 | Haleakala | NEAT | · | 5.4 km | MPC · JPL |
| 206219 | 2002 VD_{51} | — | November 6, 2002 | Anderson Mesa | LONEOS | · | 5.2 km | MPC · JPL |
| 206220 | 2002 VS_{56} | — | November 6, 2002 | Kitt Peak | Spacewatch | · | 2.8 km | MPC · JPL |
| 206221 | 2002 VH_{62} | — | November 5, 2002 | Socorro | LINEAR | · | 2.4 km | MPC · JPL |
| 206222 | 2002 VF_{66} | — | November 7, 2002 | Socorro | LINEAR | H | 1.2 km | MPC · JPL |
| 206223 | 2002 VX_{71} | — | November 7, 2002 | Socorro | LINEAR | EOS | 3.1 km | MPC · JPL |
| 206224 | 2002 VP_{74} | — | November 7, 2002 | Socorro | LINEAR | · | 3.5 km | MPC · JPL |
| 206225 | 2002 VJ_{88} | — | November 11, 2002 | Socorro | LINEAR | · | 3.4 km | MPC · JPL |
| 206226 | 2002 VN_{99} | — | November 13, 2002 | Socorro | LINEAR | · | 6.4 km | MPC · JPL |
| 206227 | 2002 VY_{103} | — | November 12, 2002 | Socorro | LINEAR | · | 6.4 km | MPC · JPL |
| 206228 | 2002 VD_{108} | — | November 12, 2002 | Socorro | LINEAR | · | 4.1 km | MPC · JPL |
| 206229 | 2002 VP_{113} | — | November 13, 2002 | Palomar | NEAT | · | 4.7 km | MPC · JPL |
| 206230 | 2002 VP_{118} | — | November 12, 2002 | Anderson Mesa | LONEOS | · | 6.5 km | MPC · JPL |
| 206231 | 2002 VE_{120} | — | November 12, 2002 | Socorro | LINEAR | · | 8.1 km | MPC · JPL |
| 206232 | 2002 VC_{124} | — | November 14, 2002 | Socorro | LINEAR | · | 3.9 km | MPC · JPL |
| 206233 | 2002 VH_{125} | — | November 13, 2002 | Palomar | NEAT | TEL | 2.1 km | MPC · JPL |
| 206234 | 2002 WC_{4} | — | November 24, 2002 | Palomar | NEAT | THM | 2.7 km | MPC · JPL |
| 206235 | 2002 WO_{5} | — | November 23, 2002 | Palomar | NEAT | · | 5.7 km | MPC · JPL |
| 206236 | 2002 WG_{9} | — | November 24, 2002 | Palomar | NEAT | · | 2.7 km | MPC · JPL |
| 206237 | 2002 WG_{15} | — | November 28, 2002 | Anderson Mesa | LONEOS | · | 3.6 km | MPC · JPL |
| 206238 | 2002 WM_{17} | — | November 30, 2002 | Socorro | LINEAR | H | 1.1 km | MPC · JPL |
| 206239 | 2002 WR_{19} | — | November 25, 2002 | Palomar | S. F. Hönig | KOR | 1.9 km | MPC · JPL |
| 206240 | 2002 WC_{27} | — | November 16, 2002 | Palomar | NEAT | · | 2.3 km | MPC · JPL |
| 206241 Dubois | 2002 WM_{28} | Dubois | November 24, 2002 | Palomar | NEAT | · | 3.3 km | MPC · JPL |
| 206242 | 2002 XD_{1} | — | December 1, 2002 | Socorro | LINEAR | · | 3.4 km | MPC · JPL |
| 206243 | 2002 XO_{16} | — | December 3, 2002 | Palomar | NEAT | EOS | 2.7 km | MPC · JPL |
| 206244 | 2002 XL_{17} | — | December 5, 2002 | Socorro | LINEAR | · | 4.0 km | MPC · JPL |
| 206245 | 2002 XU_{17} | — | December 5, 2002 | Socorro | LINEAR | · | 3.7 km | MPC · JPL |
| 206246 | 2002 XV_{20} | — | December 2, 2002 | Socorro | LINEAR | EOS | 2.9 km | MPC · JPL |
| 206247 | 2002 XJ_{26} | — | December 3, 2002 | Palomar | NEAT | · | 6.8 km | MPC · JPL |
| 206248 | 2002 XU_{35} | — | December 7, 2002 | Desert Eagle | W. K. Y. Yeung | · | 2.9 km | MPC · JPL |
| 206249 | 2002 XP_{42} | — | December 7, 2002 | Socorro | LINEAR | HYG | 4.0 km | MPC · JPL |
| 206250 | 2002 XS_{46} | — | December 7, 2002 | Socorro | LINEAR | TIR | 3.8 km | MPC · JPL |
| 206251 | 2002 XE_{47} | — | December 8, 2002 | Haleakala | NEAT | · | 5.7 km | MPC · JPL |
| 206252 | 2002 XM_{60} | — | December 10, 2002 | Socorro | LINEAR | · | 3.0 km | MPC · JPL |
| 206253 | 2002 XM_{63} | — | December 11, 2002 | Socorro | LINEAR | · | 1.8 km | MPC · JPL |
| 206254 | 2002 XD_{66} | — | December 12, 2002 | Socorro | LINEAR | T_{j} (2.97) | 7.6 km | MPC · JPL |
| 206255 | 2002 XL_{68} | — | December 12, 2002 | Palomar | NEAT | · | 5.7 km | MPC · JPL |
| 206256 | 2002 XR_{73} | — | December 11, 2002 | Socorro | LINEAR | · | 3.5 km | MPC · JPL |
| 206257 | 2002 XW_{76} | — | December 11, 2002 | Socorro | LINEAR | · | 2.8 km | MPC · JPL |
| 206258 | 2002 XG_{77} | — | December 11, 2002 | Socorro | LINEAR | · | 4.5 km | MPC · JPL |
| 206259 | 2002 XN_{83} | — | December 13, 2002 | Socorro | LINEAR | · | 7.6 km | MPC · JPL |
| 206260 | 2002 XX_{83} | — | December 13, 2002 | Palomar | NEAT | · | 4.3 km | MPC · JPL |
| 206261 | 2002 XB_{90} | — | December 14, 2002 | Socorro | LINEAR | TIR | 4.8 km | MPC · JPL |
| 206262 | 2002 XA_{91} | — | December 14, 2002 | Kingsnake | J. V. McClusky | TIR | 4.4 km | MPC · JPL |
| 206263 | 2002 XL_{102} | — | December 5, 2002 | Socorro | LINEAR | EOS | 2.8 km | MPC · JPL |
| 206264 | 2002 XQ_{113} | — | December 7, 2002 | Socorro | LINEAR | · | 7.4 km | MPC · JPL |
| 206265 Radian | 2002 XP_{115} | Radian | December 11, 2002 | Socorro | LINEAR | · | 5.2 km | MPC · JPL |
| 206266 | 2002 YW_{6} | — | December 28, 2002 | Anderson Mesa | LONEOS | T_{j} (2.97) · EUP | 6.3 km | MPC · JPL |
| 206267 | 2002 YB_{7} | — | December 28, 2002 | Anderson Mesa | LONEOS | · | 5.9 km | MPC · JPL |
| 206268 | 2002 YN_{7} | — | December 31, 2002 | Socorro | LINEAR | · | 5.2 km | MPC · JPL |
| 206269 | 2002 YE_{9} | — | December 31, 2002 | Socorro | LINEAR | · | 3.0 km | MPC · JPL |
| 206270 | 2002 YC_{10} | — | December 31, 2002 | Socorro | LINEAR | · | 4.3 km | MPC · JPL |
| 206271 | 2002 YP_{12} | — | December 31, 2002 | Socorro | LINEAR | · | 4.7 km | MPC · JPL |
| 206272 | 2002 YB_{22} | — | December 31, 2002 | Socorro | LINEAR | THM | 4.2 km | MPC · JPL |
| 206273 | 2002 YF_{26} | — | December 31, 2002 | Socorro | LINEAR | TIR | 5.0 km | MPC · JPL |
| 206274 | 2002 YZ_{28} | — | December 31, 2002 | Socorro | LINEAR | · | 4.1 km | MPC · JPL |
| 206275 | 2002 YG_{33} | — | December 30, 2002 | Socorro | LINEAR | TIR | 4.1 km | MPC · JPL |
| 206276 | 2003 AH_{5} | — | January 1, 2003 | Socorro | LINEAR | · | 3.2 km | MPC · JPL |
| 206277 | 2003 AM_{9} | — | January 3, 2003 | Kitt Peak | Spacewatch | · | 3.7 km | MPC · JPL |
| 206278 | 2003 AT_{17} | — | January 5, 2003 | Anderson Mesa | LONEOS | EUP | 8.0 km | MPC · JPL |
| 206279 | 2003 AA_{21} | — | January 5, 2003 | Socorro | LINEAR | · | 4.3 km | MPC · JPL |
| 206280 | 2003 AR_{21} | — | January 5, 2003 | Socorro | LINEAR | · | 5.6 km | MPC · JPL |
| 206281 | 2003 AH_{26} | — | January 4, 2003 | Socorro | LINEAR | · | 6.3 km | MPC · JPL |
| 206282 | 2003 AL_{43} | — | January 5, 2003 | Socorro | LINEAR | TIR | 4.2 km | MPC · JPL |
| 206283 | 2003 AV_{64} | — | January 7, 2003 | Socorro | LINEAR | · | 7.4 km | MPC · JPL |
| 206284 | 2003 AL_{66} | — | January 7, 2003 | Socorro | LINEAR | · | 6.1 km | MPC · JPL |
| 206285 | 2003 AT_{67} | — | January 8, 2003 | Socorro | LINEAR | T_{j} (2.91) | 6.9 km | MPC · JPL |
| 206286 | 2003 AY_{69} | — | January 8, 2003 | Socorro | LINEAR | (11097) | 3.0 km | MPC · JPL |
| 206287 | 2003 AG_{74} | — | January 10, 2003 | Socorro | LINEAR | · | 5.0 km | MPC · JPL |
| 206288 | 2003 AG_{85} | — | January 8, 2003 | Socorro | LINEAR | LIX | 6.7 km | MPC · JPL |
| 206289 | 2003 AT_{85} | — | January 11, 2003 | Socorro | LINEAR | (5931) · slow | 5.6 km | MPC · JPL |
| 206290 | 2003 AL_{89} | — | January 4, 2003 | Socorro | LINEAR | · | 3.5 km | MPC · JPL |
| 206291 | 2003 AM_{92} | — | January 8, 2003 | Socorro | LINEAR | · | 5.9 km | MPC · JPL |
| 206292 | 2003 BR_{31} | — | January 27, 2003 | Socorro | LINEAR | · | 1.4 km | MPC · JPL |
| 206293 | 2003 BH_{43} | — | January 27, 2003 | Socorro | LINEAR | AEG | 6.0 km | MPC · JPL |
| 206294 | 2003 BH_{83} | — | January 31, 2003 | Socorro | LINEAR | · | 5.8 km | MPC · JPL |
| 206295 | 2003 BQ_{86} | — | January 26, 2003 | Anderson Mesa | LONEOS | · | 4.6 km | MPC · JPL |
| 206296 | 2003 CJ_{18} | — | February 8, 2003 | Socorro | LINEAR | THM | 2.9 km | MPC · JPL |
| 206297 | 2003 DB_{3} | — | February 22, 2003 | Kitt Peak | Spacewatch | · | 6.9 km | MPC · JPL |
| 206298 | 2003 DO_{20} | — | February 22, 2003 | Palomar | NEAT | CYB | 3.2 km | MPC · JPL |
| 206299 | 2003 EJ_{32} | — | March 7, 2003 | Kitt Peak | Spacewatch | · | 4.2 km | MPC · JPL |
| 206300 | 2003 FX_{20} | — | March 23, 2003 | Kitt Peak | Spacewatch | · | 1.2 km | MPC · JPL |

== 206301–206400 ==
back to top

| Designation | | | Discovery | | | Properties | | Ref |
| Permanent | Provisional | Named after | Date | Site | Discoverer(s) | Category | Diam. | Ref |
|---|---|---|---|---|---|---|---|---|
| 206301 | 2003 FH_{21} | — | March 24, 2003 | Kitt Peak | Spacewatch | · | 1.2 km | MPC · JPL |
| 206302 | 2003 FJ_{106} | — | March 26, 2003 | Palomar | NEAT | · | 1.3 km | MPC · JPL |
| 206303 | 2003 HT | — | April 21, 2003 | Kitt Peak | Spacewatch | · | 1.2 km | MPC · JPL |
| 206304 | 2003 HX_{3} | — | April 24, 2003 | Anderson Mesa | LONEOS | · | 880 m | MPC · JPL |
| 206305 | 2003 HZ_{3} | — | April 24, 2003 | Anderson Mesa | LONEOS | · | 1.6 km | MPC · JPL |
| 206306 | 2003 HT_{6} | — | April 24, 2003 | Kitt Peak | Spacewatch | · | 1.3 km | MPC · JPL |
| 206307 | 2003 HZ_{9} | — | April 25, 2003 | Kitt Peak | Spacewatch | · | 1.6 km | MPC · JPL |
| 206308 | 2003 HY_{12} | — | April 24, 2003 | Kitt Peak | Spacewatch | · | 1.1 km | MPC · JPL |
| 206309 | 2003 HJ_{32} | — | April 28, 2003 | Anderson Mesa | LONEOS | · | 1.3 km | MPC · JPL |
| 206310 | 2003 HG_{38} | — | April 29, 2003 | Socorro | LINEAR | CYB | 4.6 km | MPC · JPL |
| 206311 | 2003 HO_{42} | — | April 29, 2003 | Socorro | LINEAR | · | 1.1 km | MPC · JPL |
| 206312 | 2003 HX_{46} | — | April 28, 2003 | Socorro | LINEAR | · | 1.1 km | MPC · JPL |
| 206313 | 2003 JK_{6} | — | May 1, 2003 | Socorro | LINEAR | · | 1.0 km | MPC · JPL |
| 206314 | 2003 KS_{9} | — | May 25, 2003 | Nogales | M. Schwartz, P. R. Holvorcem | · | 1.7 km | MPC · JPL |
| 206315 | 2003 KN_{13} | — | May 25, 2003 | Anderson Mesa | LONEOS | · | 1.4 km | MPC · JPL |
| 206316 | 2003 KL_{28} | — | May 21, 2003 | Anderson Mesa | LONEOS | · | 1.5 km | MPC · JPL |
| 206317 | 2003 KV_{36} | — | May 30, 2003 | Socorro | LINEAR | · | 2.1 km | MPC · JPL |
| 206318 | 2003 MN_{10} | — | June 23, 2003 | Anderson Mesa | LONEOS | · | 2.4 km | MPC · JPL |
| 206319 | 2003 MC_{13} | — | June 25, 2003 | Anderson Mesa | LONEOS | · | 1.2 km | MPC · JPL |
| 206320 | 2003 NT | — | July 1, 2003 | Haleakala | NEAT | · | 2.1 km | MPC · JPL |
| 206321 | 2003 NJ_{8} | — | July 8, 2003 | Palomar | NEAT | · | 4.3 km | MPC · JPL |
| 206322 | 2003 NV_{10} | — | July 3, 2003 | Kitt Peak | Spacewatch | V | 770 m | MPC · JPL |
| 206323 | 2003 NH_{11} | — | July 3, 2003 | Kitt Peak | Spacewatch | · | 2.0 km | MPC · JPL |
| 206324 | 2003 ON | — | July 17, 2003 | Reedy Creek | J. Broughton | · | 1.7 km | MPC · JPL |
| 206325 | 2003 OG_{2} | — | July 22, 2003 | Haleakala | NEAT | NYS | 1.4 km | MPC · JPL |
| 206326 | 2003 OT_{3} | — | July 22, 2003 | Campo Imperatore | CINEOS | · | 1.5 km | MPC · JPL |
| 206327 | 2003 OY_{3} | — | July 22, 2003 | Campo Imperatore | CINEOS | MAS | 1.0 km | MPC · JPL |
| 206328 | 2003 OW_{4} | — | July 22, 2003 | Haleakala | NEAT | SUL | 3.0 km | MPC · JPL |
| 206329 | 2003 OB_{6} | — | July 24, 2003 | Costitx | OAM | · | 1.6 km | MPC · JPL |
| 206330 | 2003 OO_{6} | — | July 23, 2003 | Socorro | LINEAR | · | 1.3 km | MPC · JPL |
| 206331 | 2003 OK_{8} | — | July 26, 2003 | Reedy Creek | J. Broughton | · | 1.7 km | MPC · JPL |
| 206332 | 2003 OZ_{8} | — | July 23, 2003 | Palomar | NEAT | PHO | 2.0 km | MPC · JPL |
| 206333 | 2003 OB_{10} | — | July 25, 2003 | Socorro | LINEAR | · | 1.4 km | MPC · JPL |
| 206334 | 2003 ON_{20} | — | July 31, 2003 | Reedy Creek | J. Broughton | · | 1.1 km | MPC · JPL |
| 206335 | 2003 OV_{22} | — | July 30, 2003 | Socorro | LINEAR | · | 3.3 km | MPC · JPL |
| 206336 | 2003 OC_{27} | — | July 24, 2003 | Palomar | NEAT | · | 1.7 km | MPC · JPL |
| 206337 | 2003 OJ_{30} | — | July 24, 2003 | Palomar | NEAT | · | 1.8 km | MPC · JPL |
| 206338 | 2003 OU_{30} | — | July 24, 2003 | Palomar | NEAT | · | 1.8 km | MPC · JPL |
| 206339 | 2003 PN_{1} | — | August 1, 2003 | Haleakala | NEAT | · | 1.9 km | MPC · JPL |
| 206340 | 2003 PW_{2} | — | August 2, 2003 | Haleakala | NEAT | · | 2.1 km | MPC · JPL |
| 206341 | 2003 PO_{3} | — | August 2, 2003 | Haleakala | NEAT | NYS | 1.5 km | MPC · JPL |
| 206342 | 2003 PQ_{6} | — | August 1, 2003 | Socorro | LINEAR | · | 920 m | MPC · JPL |
| 206343 | 2003 PB_{7} | — | August 1, 2003 | Haleakala | NEAT | · | 1.0 km | MPC · JPL |
| 206344 | 2003 PA_{8} | — | August 2, 2003 | Haleakala | NEAT | CLA | 2.9 km | MPC · JPL |
| 206345 | 2003 PA_{9} | — | August 4, 2003 | Socorro | LINEAR | V | 1.2 km | MPC · JPL |
| 206346 | 2003 PM_{9} | — | August 4, 2003 | Kitt Peak | Spacewatch | · | 1.7 km | MPC · JPL |
| 206347 | 2003 QL_{1} | — | August 19, 2003 | Campo Imperatore | CINEOS | · | 1.8 km | MPC · JPL |
| 206348 | 2003 QA_{12} | — | August 21, 2003 | Campo Imperatore | CINEOS | · | 1.3 km | MPC · JPL |
| 206349 | 2003 QQ_{13} | — | August 22, 2003 | Haleakala | NEAT | V | 1.2 km | MPC · JPL |
| 206350 | 2003 QA_{26} | — | August 22, 2003 | Socorro | LINEAR | · | 1.8 km | MPC · JPL |
| 206351 | 2003 QC_{28} | — | August 22, 2003 | Palomar | NEAT | · | 1.6 km | MPC · JPL |
| 206352 | 2003 QT_{28} | — | August 22, 2003 | Palomar | NEAT | NYS | 1.9 km | MPC · JPL |
| 206353 | 2003 QL_{34} | — | August 22, 2003 | Palomar | NEAT | · | 1.7 km | MPC · JPL |
| 206354 | 2003 QF_{40} | — | August 22, 2003 | Socorro | LINEAR | V | 1.1 km | MPC · JPL |
| 206355 | 2003 QS_{40} | — | August 22, 2003 | Socorro | LINEAR | MAS | 1.1 km | MPC · JPL |
| 206356 | 2003 QX_{43} | — | August 22, 2003 | Palomar | NEAT | NYS | 1.6 km | MPC · JPL |
| 206357 | 2003 QJ_{44} | — | August 23, 2003 | Palomar | NEAT | V | 1.1 km | MPC · JPL |
| 206358 | 2003 QL_{44} | — | August 23, 2003 | Palomar | NEAT | · | 1.5 km | MPC · JPL |
| 206359 | 2003 QM_{47} | — | August 23, 2003 | Palomar | NEAT | AMO +1km | 800 m | MPC · JPL |
| 206360 | 2003 QW_{50} | — | August 22, 2003 | Palomar | NEAT | · | 1.7 km | MPC · JPL |
| 206361 | 2003 QG_{52} | — | August 23, 2003 | Socorro | LINEAR | · | 2.6 km | MPC · JPL |
| 206362 | 2003 QF_{56} | — | August 23, 2003 | Socorro | LINEAR | EUN | 2.5 km | MPC · JPL |
| 206363 | 2003 QB_{57} | — | August 23, 2003 | Socorro | LINEAR | · | 1.9 km | MPC · JPL |
| 206364 | 2003 QS_{61} | — | August 23, 2003 | Socorro | LINEAR | RAF | 1.5 km | MPC · JPL |
| 206365 | 2003 QT_{64} | — | August 23, 2003 | Socorro | LINEAR | · | 3.6 km | MPC · JPL |
| 206366 | 2003 QS_{65} | — | August 25, 2003 | Palomar | NEAT | · | 2.1 km | MPC · JPL |
| 206367 | 2003 QK_{68} | — | August 25, 2003 | Socorro | LINEAR | · | 1.8 km | MPC · JPL |
| 206368 | 2003 QR_{70} | — | August 23, 2003 | Socorro | LINEAR | · | 1.4 km | MPC · JPL |
| 206369 | 2003 QO_{71} | — | August 25, 2003 | Socorro | LINEAR | · | 1.3 km | MPC · JPL |
| 206370 | 2003 QU_{86} | — | August 25, 2003 | Socorro | LINEAR | (2076) | 1.5 km | MPC · JPL |
| 206371 | 2003 QW_{87} | — | August 25, 2003 | Socorro | LINEAR | V | 1.0 km | MPC · JPL |
| 206372 | 2003 QO_{89} | — | August 26, 2003 | Črni Vrh | Mikuž, H. | · | 1.6 km | MPC · JPL |
| 206373 | 2003 QB_{99} | — | August 30, 2003 | Kitt Peak | Spacewatch | NYS | 1.2 km | MPC · JPL |
| 206374 | 2003 QG_{103} | — | August 31, 2003 | Socorro | LINEAR | · | 3.1 km | MPC · JPL |
| 206375 | 2003 QK_{105} | — | August 31, 2003 | Haleakala | NEAT | ADE | 4.5 km | MPC · JPL |
| 206376 | 2003 QD_{108} | — | August 30, 2003 | Socorro | LINEAR | · | 4.7 km | MPC · JPL |
| 206377 | 2003 QK_{114} | — | August 23, 2003 | Campo Imperatore | CINEOS | · | 1.2 km | MPC · JPL |
| 206378 | 2003 RB | — | September 1, 2003 | Socorro | LINEAR | AMO · APO · PHA | 380 m | MPC · JPL |
| 206379 | 2003 RV_{5} | — | September 4, 2003 | Socorro | LINEAR | EUN | 2.1 km | MPC · JPL |
| 206380 | 2003 RT_{8} | — | September 1, 2003 | Socorro | LINEAR | · | 1.8 km | MPC · JPL |
| 206381 | 2003 RB_{9} | — | September 2, 2003 | Socorro | LINEAR | · | 1.5 km | MPC · JPL |
| 206382 | 2003 RU_{13} | — | September 15, 2003 | Palomar | NEAT | · | 2.9 km | MPC · JPL |
| 206383 | 2003 RC_{16} | — | September 15, 2003 | Palomar | NEAT | · | 1.9 km | MPC · JPL |
| 206384 | 2003 RJ_{17} | — | September 15, 2003 | Haleakala | NEAT | · | 1.9 km | MPC · JPL |
| 206385 | 2003 RZ_{17} | — | September 15, 2003 | Palomar | NEAT | · | 1.5 km | MPC · JPL |
| 206386 | 2003 RR_{21} | — | September 13, 2003 | Haleakala | NEAT | · | 1.8 km | MPC · JPL |
| 206387 | 2003 RT_{23} | — | September 14, 2003 | Palomar | NEAT | EUN | 1.9 km | MPC · JPL |
| 206388 | 2003 RF_{26} | — | September 3, 2003 | Bergisch Gladbach | W. Bickel | · | 1.8 km | MPC · JPL |
| 206389 | 2003 SD_{7} | — | September 17, 2003 | Kitt Peak | Spacewatch | · | 1.1 km | MPC · JPL |
| 206390 | 2003 SY_{12} | — | September 16, 2003 | Kitt Peak | Spacewatch | MAS | 1.0 km | MPC · JPL |
| 206391 | 2003 SR_{14} | — | September 17, 2003 | Kitt Peak | Spacewatch | · | 2.3 km | MPC · JPL |
| 206392 | 2003 SD_{27} | — | September 18, 2003 | Socorro | LINEAR | · | 4.0 km | MPC · JPL |
| 206393 | 2003 SQ_{32} | — | September 17, 2003 | Kitt Peak | Spacewatch | · | 1.8 km | MPC · JPL |
| 206394 | 2003 SV_{32} | — | September 17, 2003 | Uccle | T. Pauwels | · | 2.2 km | MPC · JPL |
| 206395 | 2003 ST_{36} | — | September 18, 2003 | Desert Eagle | W. K. Y. Yeung | · | 2.1 km | MPC · JPL |
| 206396 | 2003 SM_{37} | — | September 16, 2003 | Palomar | NEAT | · | 3.8 km | MPC · JPL |
| 206397 | 2003 SS_{42} | — | September 16, 2003 | Anderson Mesa | LONEOS | · | 1.7 km | MPC · JPL |
| 206398 | 2003 SJ_{45} | — | September 16, 2003 | Anderson Mesa | LONEOS | · | 1.6 km | MPC · JPL |
| 206399 | 2003 SN_{49} | — | September 18, 2003 | Palomar | NEAT | · | 3.3 km | MPC · JPL |
| 206400 | 2003 SW_{52} | — | September 19, 2003 | Palomar | NEAT | (5) | 3.3 km | MPC · JPL |

== 206401–206500 ==
back to top

| Designation | | | Discovery | | | Properties | | Ref |
| Permanent | Provisional | Named after | Date | Site | Discoverer(s) | Category | Diam. | Ref |
|---|---|---|---|---|---|---|---|---|
| 206401 | 2003 SM_{54} | — | September 16, 2003 | Anderson Mesa | LONEOS | · | 1.6 km | MPC · JPL |
| 206402 | 2003 SQ_{58} | — | September 17, 2003 | Anderson Mesa | LONEOS | · | 2.0 km | MPC · JPL |
| 206403 | 2003 SF_{63} | — | September 17, 2003 | Kitt Peak | Spacewatch | V | 1.1 km | MPC · JPL |
| 206404 | 2003 SM_{63} | — | September 17, 2003 | Kitt Peak | Spacewatch | · | 1.8 km | MPC · JPL |
| 206405 | 2003 SA_{72} | — | September 18, 2003 | Kitt Peak | Spacewatch | · | 3.2 km | MPC · JPL |
| 206406 | 2003 SH_{89} | — | September 18, 2003 | Palomar | NEAT | · | 2.3 km | MPC · JPL |
| 206407 | 2003 SB_{90} | — | September 18, 2003 | Palomar | NEAT | · | 2.3 km | MPC · JPL |
| 206408 | 2003 SH_{95} | — | September 19, 2003 | Palomar | NEAT | (5) | 2.3 km | MPC · JPL |
| 206409 | 2003 ST_{95} | — | September 19, 2003 | Palomar | NEAT | · | 1.9 km | MPC · JPL |
| 206410 | 2003 SE_{99} | — | September 19, 2003 | Kitt Peak | Spacewatch | · | 1.3 km | MPC · JPL |
| 206411 | 2003 SS_{100} | — | September 20, 2003 | Desert Eagle | W. K. Y. Yeung | GEF · | 4.6 km | MPC · JPL |
| 206412 | 2003 SY_{104} | — | September 20, 2003 | Palomar | NEAT | · | 3.0 km | MPC · JPL |
| 206413 | 2003 SO_{111} | — | September 20, 2003 | Socorro | LINEAR | · | 2.0 km | MPC · JPL |
| 206414 | 2003 SZ_{113} | — | September 16, 2003 | Anderson Mesa | LONEOS | · | 2.5 km | MPC · JPL |
| 206415 | 2003 SM_{116} | — | September 16, 2003 | Anderson Mesa | LONEOS | · | 1.6 km | MPC · JPL |
| 206416 | 2003 SO_{118} | — | September 16, 2003 | Kitt Peak | Spacewatch | · | 2.2 km | MPC · JPL |
| 206417 | 2003 SP_{132} | — | September 19, 2003 | Kitt Peak | Spacewatch | MAS | 940 m | MPC · JPL |
| 206418 | 2003 SD_{137} | — | September 20, 2003 | Palomar | NEAT | (1547) | 2.9 km | MPC · JPL |
| 206419 | 2003 SS_{137} | — | September 21, 2003 | Campo Imperatore | CINEOS | · | 1.4 km | MPC · JPL |
| 206420 | 2003 SG_{140} | — | September 19, 2003 | Campo Imperatore | CINEOS | (5) | 2.0 km | MPC · JPL |
| 206421 | 2003 ST_{141} | — | September 20, 2003 | Campo Imperatore | CINEOS | · | 1.7 km | MPC · JPL |
| 206422 | 2003 SQ_{146} | — | September 20, 2003 | Haleakala | NEAT | · | 3.6 km | MPC · JPL |
| 206423 | 2003 SG_{148} | — | September 16, 2003 | Socorro | LINEAR | MAR | 1.8 km | MPC · JPL |
| 206424 | 2003 SX_{149} | — | September 17, 2003 | Socorro | LINEAR | · | 1.7 km | MPC · JPL |
| 206425 | 2003 SU_{157} | — | September 20, 2003 | Socorro | LINEAR | (5) | 1.7 km | MPC · JPL |
| 206426 | 2003 SP_{166} | — | September 21, 2003 | Socorro | LINEAR | · | 4.2 km | MPC · JPL |
| 206427 | 2003 SZ_{168} | — | September 23, 2003 | Haleakala | NEAT | ADE | 3.6 km | MPC · JPL |
| 206428 | 2003 SV_{170} | — | September 21, 2003 | Uccle | T. Pauwels | (5) | 1.4 km | MPC · JPL |
| 206429 | 2003 SZ_{174} | — | September 18, 2003 | Kitt Peak | Spacewatch | · | 2.0 km | MPC · JPL |
| 206430 | 2003 SH_{178} | — | September 19, 2003 | Palomar | NEAT | PHO | 2.1 km | MPC · JPL |
| 206431 | 2003 SY_{180} | — | September 20, 2003 | Socorro | LINEAR | · | 1.9 km | MPC · JPL |
| 206432 | 2003 SY_{181} | — | September 20, 2003 | Socorro | LINEAR | · | 2.0 km | MPC · JPL |
| 206433 | 2003 SK_{188} | — | September 22, 2003 | Anderson Mesa | LONEOS | · | 2.0 km | MPC · JPL |
| 206434 | 2003 SF_{195} | — | September 20, 2003 | Palomar | NEAT | · | 2.4 km | MPC · JPL |
| 206435 | 2003 SR_{196} | — | September 20, 2003 | Palomar | NEAT | · | 2.0 km | MPC · JPL |
| 206436 | 2003 SE_{198} | — | September 21, 2003 | Anderson Mesa | LONEOS | · | 3.0 km | MPC · JPL |
| 206437 | 2003 SW_{198} | — | September 21, 2003 | Anderson Mesa | LONEOS | ADE | 2.7 km | MPC · JPL |
| 206438 | 2003 SS_{204} | — | September 22, 2003 | Socorro | LINEAR | · | 3.8 km | MPC · JPL |
| 206439 | 2003 SE_{207} | — | September 26, 2003 | Socorro | LINEAR | · | 1.2 km | MPC · JPL |
| 206440 | 2003 SC_{210} | — | September 25, 2003 | Uccle | Uccle | · | 4.1 km | MPC · JPL |
| 206441 | 2003 SY_{220} | — | September 29, 2003 | Desert Eagle | W. K. Y. Yeung | · | 2.8 km | MPC · JPL |
| 206442 | 2003 SY_{233} | — | September 25, 2003 | Palomar | NEAT | · | 5.1 km | MPC · JPL |
| 206443 | 2003 SY_{234} | — | September 26, 2003 | Socorro | LINEAR | · | 2.0 km | MPC · JPL |
| 206444 | 2003 SJ_{235} | — | September 27, 2003 | Socorro | LINEAR | · | 1.2 km | MPC · JPL |
| 206445 | 2003 SL_{246} | — | September 26, 2003 | Socorro | LINEAR | MAR | 1.6 km | MPC · JPL |
| 206446 | 2003 SU_{260} | — | September 27, 2003 | Kitt Peak | Spacewatch | · | 1.2 km | MPC · JPL |
| 206447 | 2003 SN_{268} | — | September 29, 2003 | Kitt Peak | Spacewatch | · | 2.7 km | MPC · JPL |
| 206448 | 2003 SY_{271} | — | September 26, 2003 | Goodricke-Pigott | R. A. Tucker | · | 3.1 km | MPC · JPL |
| 206449 | 2003 SJ_{274} | — | September 28, 2003 | Socorro | LINEAR | · | 1.7 km | MPC · JPL |
| 206450 | 2003 SG_{279} | — | September 30, 2003 | Kitt Peak | Spacewatch | · | 1.3 km | MPC · JPL |
| 206451 | 2003 SD_{302} | — | September 17, 2003 | Palomar | NEAT | · | 1.5 km | MPC · JPL |
| 206452 | 2003 SA_{309} | — | September 30, 2003 | Anderson Mesa | LONEOS | · | 4.9 km | MPC · JPL |
| 206453 | 2003 SE_{314} | — | September 21, 2003 | Anderson Mesa | LONEOS | MAR | 1.7 km | MPC · JPL |
| 206454 | 2003 SK_{318} | — | September 17, 2003 | Kitt Peak | Spacewatch | · | 1.4 km | MPC · JPL |
| 206455 | 2003 SM_{319} | — | September 21, 2003 | Haleakala | NEAT | · | 4.2 km | MPC · JPL |
| 206456 | 2003 SJ_{321} | — | September 20, 2003 | Palomar | NEAT | · | 2.0 km | MPC · JPL |
| 206457 | 2003 SV_{356} | — | September 18, 2003 | Kitt Peak | Spacewatch | NYS | 1.5 km | MPC · JPL |
| 206458 | 2003 TM | — | October 3, 2003 | Cordell-Lorenz | D. T. Durig | · | 2.0 km | MPC · JPL |
| 206459 | 2003 TD_{5} | — | October 2, 2003 | Socorro | LINEAR | · | 4.5 km | MPC · JPL |
| 206460 | 2003 TY_{6} | — | October 1, 2003 | Anderson Mesa | LONEOS | JUN | 1.7 km | MPC · JPL |
| 206461 | 2003 TE_{7} | — | October 1, 2003 | Anderson Mesa | LONEOS | ADE | 3.6 km | MPC · JPL |
| 206462 | 2003 TN_{10} | — | October 15, 2003 | Wrightwood | J. W. Young | · | 2.4 km | MPC · JPL |
| 206463 | 2003 TW_{14} | — | October 14, 2003 | Anderson Mesa | LONEOS | · | 1.5 km | MPC · JPL |
| 206464 | 2003 TM_{15} | — | October 15, 2003 | Anderson Mesa | LONEOS | · | 3.3 km | MPC · JPL |
| 206465 | 2003 TA_{18} | — | October 14, 2003 | Palomar | NEAT | ADE | 4.0 km | MPC · JPL |
| 206466 | 2003 TZ_{41} | — | October 2, 2003 | Kitt Peak | Spacewatch | (5) | 1.4 km | MPC · JPL |
| 206467 | 2003 TY_{58} | — | October 2, 2003 | Socorro | LINEAR | · | 1.9 km | MPC · JPL |
| 206468 | 2003 UY | — | October 16, 2003 | Kitt Peak | Spacewatch | · | 1.8 km | MPC · JPL |
| 206469 | 2003 UD_{2} | — | October 16, 2003 | Kitt Peak | Spacewatch | (5) | 1.4 km | MPC · JPL |
| 206470 | 2003 UQ_{2} | — | October 16, 2003 | Kitt Peak | Spacewatch | NYS | 1.3 km | MPC · JPL |
| 206471 | 2003 US_{8} | — | October 16, 2003 | Socorro | LINEAR | HNS | 1.7 km | MPC · JPL |
| 206472 | 2003 UX_{11} | — | October 17, 2003 | Kitt Peak | Spacewatch | · | 4.1 km | MPC · JPL |
| 206473 | 2003 UZ_{22} | — | October 19, 2003 | Kitt Peak | Spacewatch | · | 2.2 km | MPC · JPL |
| 206474 | 2003 UU_{34} | — | October 18, 2003 | Anderson Mesa | LONEOS | EUN | 2.0 km | MPC · JPL |
| 206475 | 2003 UP_{48} | — | October 16, 2003 | Anderson Mesa | LONEOS | · | 2.5 km | MPC · JPL |
| 206476 | 2003 UU_{49} | — | October 16, 2003 | Palomar | NEAT | · | 3.5 km | MPC · JPL |
| 206477 | 2003 UV_{50} | — | October 18, 2003 | Palomar | NEAT | · | 2.4 km | MPC · JPL |
| 206478 | 2003 UO_{51} | — | October 18, 2003 | Palomar | NEAT | · | 3.6 km | MPC · JPL |
| 206479 | 2003 UV_{51} | — | October 18, 2003 | Palomar | NEAT | · | 1.8 km | MPC · JPL |
| 206480 | 2003 UW_{52} | — | October 18, 2003 | Palomar | NEAT | BRG | 2.7 km | MPC · JPL |
| 206481 | 2003 UL_{58} | — | October 16, 2003 | Kitt Peak | Spacewatch | · | 2.3 km | MPC · JPL |
| 206482 | 2003 UX_{64} | — | October 16, 2003 | Anderson Mesa | LONEOS | · | 2.5 km | MPC · JPL |
| 206483 | 2003 UU_{65} | — | October 16, 2003 | Palomar | NEAT | · | 2.6 km | MPC · JPL |
| 206484 | 2003 UJ_{66} | — | October 16, 2003 | Palomar | NEAT | · | 2.4 km | MPC · JPL |
| 206485 | 2003 UP_{66} | — | October 16, 2003 | Palomar | NEAT | · | 2.7 km | MPC · JPL |
| 206486 | 2003 US_{66} | — | October 16, 2003 | Palomar | NEAT | ADE | 3.0 km | MPC · JPL |
| 206487 | 2003 UG_{68} | — | October 16, 2003 | Kitt Peak | Spacewatch | · | 1.5 km | MPC · JPL |
| 206488 | 2003 UJ_{74} | — | October 16, 2003 | Haleakala | NEAT | · | 2.2 km | MPC · JPL |
| 206489 | 2003 UO_{74} | — | October 17, 2003 | Kitt Peak | Spacewatch | · | 2.0 km | MPC · JPL |
| 206490 | 2003 UX_{76} | — | October 17, 2003 | Anderson Mesa | LONEOS | EUN | 1.5 km | MPC · JPL |
| 206491 | 2003 UW_{79} | — | October 16, 2003 | Goodricke-Pigott | R. A. Tucker | · | 2.1 km | MPC · JPL |
| 206492 | 2003 UW_{80} | — | October 16, 2003 | Anderson Mesa | LONEOS | · | 3.0 km | MPC · JPL |
| 206493 | 2003 UX_{80} | — | October 16, 2003 | Anderson Mesa | LONEOS | · | 2.2 km | MPC · JPL |
| 206494 | 2003 UQ_{84} | — | October 18, 2003 | Kitt Peak | Spacewatch | · | 1.4 km | MPC · JPL |
| 206495 | 2003 UG_{85} | — | October 18, 2003 | Kitt Peak | Spacewatch | · | 1.6 km | MPC · JPL |
| 206496 | 2003 UC_{95} | — | October 18, 2003 | Kitt Peak | Spacewatch | · | 2.2 km | MPC · JPL |
| 206497 | 2003 UR_{100} | — | October 19, 2003 | Haleakala | NEAT | (5) | 1.8 km | MPC · JPL |
| 206498 | 2003 UT_{100} | — | October 19, 2003 | Haleakala | NEAT | · | 4.6 km | MPC · JPL |
| 206499 | 2003 UV_{100} | — | October 20, 2003 | Kitt Peak | Spacewatch | · | 2.0 km | MPC · JPL |
| 206500 | 2003 UQ_{103} | — | October 20, 2003 | Kitt Peak | Spacewatch | · | 1.6 km | MPC · JPL |

== 206501–206600 ==
back to top

| Designation | | | Discovery | | | Properties | | Ref |
| Permanent | Provisional | Named after | Date | Site | Discoverer(s) | Category | Diam. | Ref |
|---|---|---|---|---|---|---|---|---|
| 206501 | 2003 UD_{109} | — | October 19, 2003 | Kitt Peak | Spacewatch | (17392) | 2.1 km | MPC · JPL |
| 206502 | 2003 UK_{113} | — | October 20, 2003 | Socorro | LINEAR | · | 1.6 km | MPC · JPL |
| 206503 | 2003 UB_{115} | — | October 20, 2003 | Kitt Peak | Spacewatch | EUN | 1.7 km | MPC · JPL |
| 206504 | 2003 UN_{116} | — | October 21, 2003 | Socorro | LINEAR | (5) | 2.0 km | MPC · JPL |
| 206505 | 2003 UR_{116} | — | October 21, 2003 | Socorro | LINEAR | (5) | 1.9 km | MPC · JPL |
| 206506 | 2003 UJ_{118} | — | October 17, 2003 | Kitt Peak | Spacewatch | · | 3.0 km | MPC · JPL |
| 206507 | 2003 UV_{119} | — | October 18, 2003 | Socorro | LINEAR | JUN | 1.5 km | MPC · JPL |
| 206508 | 2003 UP_{122} | — | October 19, 2003 | Socorro | LINEAR | · | 2.5 km | MPC · JPL |
| 206509 | 2003 UX_{124} | — | October 20, 2003 | Socorro | LINEAR | · | 3.1 km | MPC · JPL |
| 206510 | 2003 UU_{126} | — | October 20, 2003 | Palomar | NEAT | · | 3.0 km | MPC · JPL |
| 206511 | 2003 UW_{126} | — | October 20, 2003 | Kitt Peak | Spacewatch | · | 1.6 km | MPC · JPL |
| 206512 | 2003 UL_{127} | — | October 21, 2003 | Kitt Peak | Spacewatch | · | 2.6 km | MPC · JPL |
| 206513 | 2003 UT_{129} | — | October 18, 2003 | Palomar | NEAT | V | 1.1 km | MPC · JPL |
| 206514 | 2003 UK_{132} | — | October 19, 2003 | Palomar | NEAT | (5) | 2.1 km | MPC · JPL |
| 206515 | 2003 UB_{133} | — | October 19, 2003 | Palomar | NEAT | GEF | 2.1 km | MPC · JPL |
| 206516 | 2003 UW_{133} | — | October 20, 2003 | Palomar | NEAT | · | 1.9 km | MPC · JPL |
| 206517 | 2003 UX_{134} | — | October 20, 2003 | Palomar | NEAT | (5) | 2.3 km | MPC · JPL |
| 206518 | 2003 UD_{138} | — | October 21, 2003 | Socorro | LINEAR | · | 1.9 km | MPC · JPL |
| 206519 | 2003 UF_{138} | — | October 21, 2003 | Socorro | LINEAR | · | 2.5 km | MPC · JPL |
| 206520 | 2003 UM_{141} | — | October 18, 2003 | Anderson Mesa | LONEOS | · | 3.3 km | MPC · JPL |
| 206521 | 2003 UH_{143} | — | October 18, 2003 | Anderson Mesa | LONEOS | · | 2.1 km | MPC · JPL |
| 206522 | 2003 UL_{145} | — | October 18, 2003 | Anderson Mesa | LONEOS | · | 2.9 km | MPC · JPL |
| 206523 | 2003 UT_{145} | — | October 18, 2003 | Anderson Mesa | LONEOS | · | 2.9 km | MPC · JPL |
| 206524 | 2003 UQ_{156} | — | October 20, 2003 | Socorro | LINEAR | · | 2.5 km | MPC · JPL |
| 206525 | 2003 UN_{159} | — | October 20, 2003 | Kitt Peak | Spacewatch | V | 1.1 km | MPC · JPL |
| 206526 | 2003 UR_{159} | — | October 20, 2003 | Kitt Peak | Spacewatch | · | 2.3 km | MPC · JPL |
| 206527 | 2003 UD_{162} | — | October 21, 2003 | Socorro | LINEAR | (5) | 1.7 km | MPC · JPL |
| 206528 | 2003 US_{162} | — | October 21, 2003 | Socorro | LINEAR | · | 1.8 km | MPC · JPL |
| 206529 | 2003 UM_{168} | — | October 22, 2003 | Socorro | LINEAR | · | 3.0 km | MPC · JPL |
| 206530 | 2003 UQ_{168} | — | October 22, 2003 | Socorro | LINEAR | (5) | 2.1 km | MPC · JPL |
| 206531 | 2003 UP_{173} | — | October 20, 2003 | Kitt Peak | Spacewatch | · | 2.7 km | MPC · JPL |
| 206532 | 2003 UJ_{174} | — | October 21, 2003 | Kitt Peak | Spacewatch | · | 1.8 km | MPC · JPL |
| 206533 | 2003 UN_{174} | — | October 21, 2003 | Palomar | NEAT | · | 2.3 km | MPC · JPL |
| 206534 | 2003 UL_{176} | — | October 21, 2003 | Anderson Mesa | LONEOS | · | 1.7 km | MPC · JPL |
| 206535 | 2003 UJ_{184} | — | October 21, 2003 | Palomar | NEAT | · | 2.3 km | MPC · JPL |
| 206536 | 2003 UK_{187} | — | October 22, 2003 | Socorro | LINEAR | · | 3.3 km | MPC · JPL |
| 206537 | 2003 UY_{187} | — | October 22, 2003 | Socorro | LINEAR | · | 2.5 km | MPC · JPL |
| 206538 | 2003 UJ_{194} | — | October 20, 2003 | Socorro | LINEAR | · | 2.3 km | MPC · JPL |
| 206539 | 2003 UM_{195} | — | October 20, 2003 | Kitt Peak | Spacewatch | · | 2.4 km | MPC · JPL |
| 206540 | 2003 UH_{196} | — | October 21, 2003 | Kitt Peak | Spacewatch | · | 1.9 km | MPC · JPL |
| 206541 | 2003 UV_{196} | — | October 21, 2003 | Kitt Peak | Spacewatch | · | 2.2 km | MPC · JPL |
| 206542 | 2003 UB_{198} | — | October 21, 2003 | Anderson Mesa | LONEOS | · | 2.8 km | MPC · JPL |
| 206543 | 2003 UN_{198} | — | October 21, 2003 | Kitt Peak | Spacewatch | · | 2.1 km | MPC · JPL |
| 206544 | 2003 UE_{199} | — | October 21, 2003 | Socorro | LINEAR | · | 1.4 km | MPC · JPL |
| 206545 | 2003 UH_{204} | — | October 21, 2003 | Kitt Peak | Spacewatch | · | 1.7 km | MPC · JPL |
| 206546 | 2003 UT_{206} | — | October 22, 2003 | Socorro | LINEAR | · | 2.6 km | MPC · JPL |
| 206547 | 2003 UO_{217} | — | October 21, 2003 | Socorro | LINEAR | NAE | 4.7 km | MPC · JPL |
| 206548 | 2003 UY_{217} | — | October 21, 2003 | Socorro | LINEAR | · | 2.6 km | MPC · JPL |
| 206549 | 2003 UW_{219} | — | October 21, 2003 | Palomar | NEAT | · | 1.8 km | MPC · JPL |
| 206550 | 2003 UH_{223} | — | October 22, 2003 | Socorro | LINEAR | · | 3.4 km | MPC · JPL |
| 206551 | 2003 UW_{234} | — | October 24, 2003 | Socorro | LINEAR | · | 2.2 km | MPC · JPL |
| 206552 | 2003 UW_{235} | — | October 22, 2003 | Kitt Peak | Spacewatch | · | 1.6 km | MPC · JPL |
| 206553 | 2003 UO_{237} | — | October 23, 2003 | Kitt Peak | Spacewatch | ADE | 2.7 km | MPC · JPL |
| 206554 | 2003 UG_{241} | — | October 24, 2003 | Socorro | LINEAR | (29841) | 2.2 km | MPC · JPL |
| 206555 | 2003 UP_{250} | — | October 25, 2003 | Socorro | LINEAR | · | 2.7 km | MPC · JPL |
| 206556 | 2003 US_{250} | — | October 25, 2003 | Socorro | LINEAR | · | 2.2 km | MPC · JPL |
| 206557 | 2003 UV_{250} | — | October 25, 2003 | Socorro | LINEAR | · | 3.5 km | MPC · JPL |
| 206558 | 2003 UB_{254} | — | October 24, 2003 | Kitt Peak | Spacewatch | · | 1.5 km | MPC · JPL |
| 206559 | 2003 UL_{256} | — | October 25, 2003 | Socorro | LINEAR | MIS | 3.7 km | MPC · JPL |
| 206560 | 2003 UG_{258} | — | October 25, 2003 | Kitt Peak | Spacewatch | · | 1.2 km | MPC · JPL |
| 206561 | 2003 UQ_{258} | — | October 25, 2003 | Kitt Peak | Spacewatch | · | 2.0 km | MPC · JPL |
| 206562 | 2003 UU_{261} | — | October 26, 2003 | Kitt Peak | Spacewatch | · | 1.5 km | MPC · JPL |
| 206563 | 2003 UO_{265} | — | October 27, 2003 | Kitt Peak | Spacewatch | · | 3.1 km | MPC · JPL |
| 206564 | 2003 UL_{268} | — | October 28, 2003 | Socorro | LINEAR | (5) | 1.9 km | MPC · JPL |
| 206565 | 2003 UJ_{270} | — | October 16, 2003 | Anderson Mesa | LONEOS | · | 1.8 km | MPC · JPL |
| 206566 | 2003 UT_{274} | — | October 30, 2003 | Socorro | LINEAR | · | 2.2 km | MPC · JPL |
| 206567 | 2003 UA_{275} | — | October 29, 2003 | Kitt Peak | Spacewatch | · | 2.2 km | MPC · JPL |
| 206568 | 2003 UX_{279} | — | October 27, 2003 | Socorro | LINEAR | · | 4.0 km | MPC · JPL |
| 206569 | 2003 UX_{280} | — | October 28, 2003 | Socorro | LINEAR | · | 3.5 km | MPC · JPL |
| 206570 | 2003 UR_{298} | — | October 16, 2003 | Kitt Peak | Spacewatch | · | 2.7 km | MPC · JPL |
| 206571 | 2003 UT_{307} | — | October 18, 2003 | Anderson Mesa | LONEOS | · | 2.0 km | MPC · JPL |
| 206572 | 2003 UK_{309} | — | October 19, 2003 | Kitt Peak | Spacewatch | KOR | 1.4 km | MPC · JPL |
| 206573 | 2003 UU_{314} | — | October 17, 2003 | Kitt Peak | Spacewatch | · | 3.7 km | MPC · JPL |
| 206574 Illyés | 2003 VC | Illyés | November 3, 2003 | Piszkéstető | K. Sárneczky | · | 2.7 km | MPC · JPL |
| 206575 | 2003 VT_{5} | — | November 15, 2003 | Kitt Peak | Spacewatch | MRX | 1.9 km | MPC · JPL |
| 206576 | 2003 VE_{8} | — | November 14, 2003 | Palomar | NEAT | EUN | 2.3 km | MPC · JPL |
| 206577 | 2003 VW_{10} | — | November 15, 2003 | Kitt Peak | Spacewatch | · | 2.0 km | MPC · JPL |
| 206578 | 2003 WQ | — | November 16, 2003 | Catalina | CSS | (5) | 1.8 km | MPC · JPL |
| 206579 | 2003 WX_{2} | — | November 16, 2003 | Desert Moon | Stevens, B. L. | · | 3.8 km | MPC · JPL |
| 206580 | 2003 WU_{3} | — | November 16, 2003 | Catalina | CSS | · | 3.1 km | MPC · JPL |
| 206581 | 2003 WT_{7} | — | November 18, 2003 | Kitt Peak | Spacewatch | MAR | 1.9 km | MPC · JPL |
| 206582 | 2003 WV_{7} | — | November 19, 2003 | Socorro | LINEAR | · | 2.7 km | MPC · JPL |
| 206583 | 2003 WA_{10} | — | November 18, 2003 | Kitt Peak | Spacewatch | · | 3.4 km | MPC · JPL |
| 206584 | 2003 WJ_{13} | — | November 16, 2003 | Kitt Peak | Spacewatch | · | 2.2 km | MPC · JPL |
| 206585 | 2003 WM_{13} | — | November 16, 2003 | Kitt Peak | Spacewatch | · | 2.3 km | MPC · JPL |
| 206586 | 2003 WO_{17} | — | November 18, 2003 | Palomar | NEAT | · | 2.3 km | MPC · JPL |
| 206587 | 2003 WJ_{20} | — | November 19, 2003 | Socorro | LINEAR | · | 3.2 km | MPC · JPL |
| 206588 | 2003 WP_{22} | — | November 20, 2003 | Socorro | LINEAR | · | 2.8 km | MPC · JPL |
| 206589 | 2003 WU_{27} | — | November 16, 2003 | Kitt Peak | Spacewatch | · | 1.6 km | MPC · JPL |
| 206590 | 2003 WU_{28} | — | November 18, 2003 | Kitt Peak | Spacewatch | WIT | 1.2 km | MPC · JPL |
| 206591 | 2003 WV_{31} | — | November 18, 2003 | Palomar | NEAT | · | 1.9 km | MPC · JPL |
| 206592 | 2003 WW_{31} | — | November 18, 2003 | Palomar | NEAT | · | 2.3 km | MPC · JPL |
| 206593 | 2003 WN_{34} | — | November 19, 2003 | Kitt Peak | Spacewatch | · | 1.8 km | MPC · JPL |
| 206594 | 2003 WY_{37} | — | November 19, 2003 | Socorro | LINEAR | · | 3.0 km | MPC · JPL |
| 206595 | 2003 WN_{39} | — | November 19, 2003 | Kitt Peak | Spacewatch | · | 3.2 km | MPC · JPL |
| 206596 | 2003 WA_{41} | — | November 19, 2003 | Kitt Peak | Spacewatch | · | 2.1 km | MPC · JPL |
| 206597 | 2003 WC_{44} | — | November 19, 2003 | Palomar | NEAT | · | 2.7 km | MPC · JPL |
| 206598 | 2003 WX_{44} | — | November 19, 2003 | Palomar | NEAT | · | 2.9 km | MPC · JPL |
| 206599 | 2003 WE_{49} | — | November 19, 2003 | Kitt Peak | Spacewatch | · | 1.6 km | MPC · JPL |
| 206600 | 2003 WE_{53} | — | November 20, 2003 | Kitt Peak | Spacewatch | · | 2.2 km | MPC · JPL |

== 206601–206700 ==
back to top

| Designation | | | Discovery | | | Properties | | Ref |
| Permanent | Provisional | Named after | Date | Site | Discoverer(s) | Category | Diam. | Ref |
|---|---|---|---|---|---|---|---|---|
| 206601 | 2003 WE_{54} | — | November 20, 2003 | Kitt Peak | Spacewatch | · | 3.3 km | MPC · JPL |
| 206602 | 2003 WB_{55} | — | November 20, 2003 | Socorro | LINEAR | · | 4.6 km | MPC · JPL |
| 206603 | 2003 WG_{55} | — | November 20, 2003 | Socorro | LINEAR | · | 2.5 km | MPC · JPL |
| 206604 | 2003 WJ_{61} | — | November 19, 2003 | Kitt Peak | Spacewatch | · | 1.3 km | MPC · JPL |
| 206605 | 2003 WY_{64} | — | November 19, 2003 | Kitt Peak | Spacewatch | · | 2.5 km | MPC · JPL |
| 206606 | 2003 WO_{66} | — | November 19, 2003 | Kitt Peak | Spacewatch | · | 1.6 km | MPC · JPL |
| 206607 | 2003 WD_{69} | — | November 19, 2003 | Kitt Peak | Spacewatch | BRA | 2.4 km | MPC · JPL |
| 206608 | 2003 WN_{76} | — | November 19, 2003 | Socorro | LINEAR | · | 1.5 km | MPC · JPL |
| 206609 | 2003 WC_{77} | — | November 19, 2003 | Palomar | NEAT | · | 5.1 km | MPC · JPL |
| 206610 | 2003 WF_{78} | — | November 20, 2003 | Socorro | LINEAR | · | 1.6 km | MPC · JPL |
| 206611 | 2003 WZ_{79} | — | November 20, 2003 | Socorro | LINEAR | · | 3.4 km | MPC · JPL |
| 206612 | 2003 WN_{94} | — | November 19, 2003 | Anderson Mesa | LONEOS | · | 2.0 km | MPC · JPL |
| 206613 | 2003 WO_{100} | — | November 20, 2003 | Palomar | NEAT | · | 3.3 km | MPC · JPL |
| 206614 | 2003 WN_{103} | — | November 21, 2003 | Socorro | LINEAR | · | 3.2 km | MPC · JPL |
| 206615 | 2003 WX_{107} | — | November 24, 2003 | Kitt Peak | Spacewatch | · | 2.4 km | MPC · JPL |
| 206616 | 2003 WK_{110} | — | November 20, 2003 | Socorro | LINEAR | AEO | 1.9 km | MPC · JPL |
| 206617 | 2003 WX_{110} | — | November 20, 2003 | Socorro | LINEAR | · | 3.1 km | MPC · JPL |
| 206618 | 2003 WX_{114} | — | November 20, 2003 | Socorro | LINEAR | · | 3.1 km | MPC · JPL |
| 206619 | 2003 WS_{117} | — | November 20, 2003 | Socorro | LINEAR | · | 2.6 km | MPC · JPL |
| 206620 | 2003 WW_{123} | — | November 20, 2003 | Socorro | LINEAR | · | 2.9 km | MPC · JPL |
| 206621 | 2003 WY_{123} | — | November 20, 2003 | Socorro | LINEAR | · | 3.4 km | MPC · JPL |
| 206622 | 2003 WT_{140} | — | November 21, 2003 | Socorro | LINEAR | · | 3.2 km | MPC · JPL |
| 206623 | 2003 WA_{141} | — | November 21, 2003 | Socorro | LINEAR | · | 5.8 km | MPC · JPL |
| 206624 | 2003 WR_{142} | — | November 21, 2003 | Palomar | NEAT | · | 3.8 km | MPC · JPL |
| 206625 | 2003 WW_{142} | — | November 23, 2003 | Socorro | LINEAR | · | 2.6 km | MPC · JPL |
| 206626 | 2003 WM_{145} | — | November 21, 2003 | Socorro | LINEAR | · | 2.5 km | MPC · JPL |
| 206627 | 2003 WO_{146} | — | November 23, 2003 | Palomar | NEAT | · | 3.4 km | MPC · JPL |
| 206628 | 2003 WE_{151} | — | November 24, 2003 | Palomar | NEAT | EUP | 7.9 km | MPC · JPL |
| 206629 | 2003 WT_{154} | — | November 26, 2003 | Socorro | LINEAR | · | 2.4 km | MPC · JPL |
| 206630 | 2003 WK_{159} | — | November 29, 2003 | Socorro | LINEAR | · | 3.0 km | MPC · JPL |
| 206631 | 2003 WO_{161} | — | November 30, 2003 | Socorro | LINEAR | · | 3.8 km | MPC · JPL |
| 206632 | 2003 WD_{167} | — | November 18, 2003 | Kitt Peak | Spacewatch | · | 2.2 km | MPC · JPL |
| 206633 | 2003 WO_{170} | — | November 20, 2003 | Socorro | LINEAR | · | 6.6 km | MPC · JPL |
| 206634 | 2003 WA_{171} | — | November 21, 2003 | Palomar | NEAT | · | 4.8 km | MPC · JPL |
| 206635 | 2003 WS_{171} | — | November 29, 2003 | Socorro | LINEAR | · | 2.9 km | MPC · JPL |
| 206636 | 2003 WX_{171} | — | November 29, 2003 | Socorro | LINEAR | · | 2.8 km | MPC · JPL |
| 206637 | 2003 WR_{172} | — | November 30, 2003 | Kitt Peak | Spacewatch | (5) | 2.2 km | MPC · JPL |
| 206638 | 2003 WA_{190} | — | November 24, 2003 | Socorro | LINEAR | · | 4.5 km | MPC · JPL |
| 206639 | 2003 WJ_{190} | — | November 24, 2003 | Palomar | NEAT | GAL | 2.3 km | MPC · JPL |
| 206640 | 2003 XS_{5} | — | December 3, 2003 | Anderson Mesa | LONEOS | · | 6.4 km | MPC · JPL |
| 206641 | 2003 XJ_{8} | — | December 4, 2003 | Socorro | LINEAR | · | 8.3 km | MPC · JPL |
| 206642 | 2003 XH_{13} | — | December 14, 2003 | Palomar | NEAT | · | 1.7 km | MPC · JPL |
| 206643 | 2003 XL_{13} | — | December 14, 2003 | Palomar | NEAT | · | 4.2 km | MPC · JPL |
| 206644 | 2003 XM_{21} | — | December 14, 2003 | Kitt Peak | Spacewatch | · | 3.5 km | MPC · JPL |
| 206645 | 2003 XZ_{34} | — | December 3, 2003 | Socorro | LINEAR | · | 2.7 km | MPC · JPL |
| 206646 | 2003 YG_{3} | — | December 19, 2003 | Kingsnake | J. V. McClusky | · | 5.2 km | MPC · JPL |
| 206647 | 2003 YL_{6} | — | December 17, 2003 | Socorro | LINEAR | · | 1.7 km | MPC · JPL |
| 206648 | 2003 YL_{9} | — | December 16, 2003 | Anderson Mesa | LONEOS | · | 6.9 km | MPC · JPL |
| 206649 | 2003 YD_{18} | — | December 16, 2003 | Catalina | CSS | DOR | 4.5 km | MPC · JPL |
| 206650 | 2003 YP_{23} | — | December 17, 2003 | Socorro | LINEAR | · | 2.7 km | MPC · JPL |
| 206651 | 2003 YU_{24} | — | December 18, 2003 | Socorro | LINEAR | · | 3.4 km | MPC · JPL |
| 206652 | 2003 YH_{25} | — | December 18, 2003 | Socorro | LINEAR | · | 2.6 km | MPC · JPL |
| 206653 | 2003 YQ_{26} | — | December 18, 2003 | Kitt Peak | Spacewatch | · | 4.9 km | MPC · JPL |
| 206654 | 2003 YX_{27} | — | December 17, 2003 | Palomar | NEAT | AGN | 1.7 km | MPC · JPL |
| 206655 | 2003 YN_{35} | — | December 19, 2003 | Socorro | LINEAR | · | 3.2 km | MPC · JPL |
| 206656 | 2003 YD_{37} | — | December 17, 2003 | Kitt Peak | Spacewatch | KOR | 1.9 km | MPC · JPL |
| 206657 | 2003 YF_{39} | — | December 19, 2003 | Kitt Peak | Spacewatch | · | 3.2 km | MPC · JPL |
| 206658 | 2003 YW_{39} | — | December 19, 2003 | Kitt Peak | Spacewatch | · | 2.4 km | MPC · JPL |
| 206659 | 2003 YD_{44} | — | December 19, 2003 | Kitt Peak | Spacewatch | THM | 3.1 km | MPC · JPL |
| 206660 | 2003 YL_{50} | — | December 18, 2003 | Socorro | LINEAR | · | 3.2 km | MPC · JPL |
| 206661 | 2003 YP_{60} | — | December 19, 2003 | Kitt Peak | Spacewatch | · | 5.3 km | MPC · JPL |
| 206662 | 2003 YB_{64} | — | December 19, 2003 | Socorro | LINEAR | · | 2.4 km | MPC · JPL |
| 206663 | 2003 YF_{66} | — | December 20, 2003 | Socorro | LINEAR | · | 2.8 km | MPC · JPL |
| 206664 | 2003 YL_{71} | — | December 18, 2003 | Socorro | LINEAR | · | 2.7 km | MPC · JPL |
| 206665 | 2003 YZ_{72} | — | December 18, 2003 | Socorro | LINEAR | · | 2.4 km | MPC · JPL |
| 206666 | 2003 YA_{78} | — | December 18, 2003 | Socorro | LINEAR | · | 5.5 km | MPC · JPL |
| 206667 | 2003 YJ_{82} | — | December 18, 2003 | Socorro | LINEAR | · | 2.5 km | MPC · JPL |
| 206668 | 2003 YE_{85} | — | December 19, 2003 | Socorro | LINEAR | · | 4.0 km | MPC · JPL |
| 206669 | 2003 YY_{86} | — | December 19, 2003 | Socorro | LINEAR | · | 3.3 km | MPC · JPL |
| 206670 | 2003 YL_{89} | — | December 19, 2003 | Socorro | LINEAR | · | 5.6 km | MPC · JPL |
| 206671 | 2003 YK_{95} | — | December 19, 2003 | Socorro | LINEAR | · | 2.4 km | MPC · JPL |
| 206672 | 2003 YR_{107} | — | December 23, 2003 | Socorro | LINEAR | · | 3.2 km | MPC · JPL |
| 206673 | 2003 YC_{111} | — | December 27, 2003 | Desert Eagle | W. K. Y. Yeung | · | 2.9 km | MPC · JPL |
| 206674 | 2003 YX_{111} | — | December 23, 2003 | Socorro | LINEAR | EUN | 2.0 km | MPC · JPL |
| 206675 | 2003 YB_{114} | — | December 25, 2003 | Kitt Peak | Spacewatch | · | 4.2 km | MPC · JPL |
| 206676 | 2003 YF_{125} | — | December 27, 2003 | Socorro | LINEAR | · | 2.4 km | MPC · JPL |
| 206677 | 2003 YT_{126} | — | December 27, 2003 | Socorro | LINEAR | LIX | 5.3 km | MPC · JPL |
| 206678 | 2003 YY_{129} | — | December 27, 2003 | Socorro | LINEAR | · | 5.4 km | MPC · JPL |
| 206679 | 2003 YJ_{131} | — | December 28, 2003 | Socorro | LINEAR | · | 3.6 km | MPC · JPL |
| 206680 | 2003 YU_{132} | — | December 28, 2003 | Socorro | LINEAR | · | 3.2 km | MPC · JPL |
| 206681 | 2003 YD_{135} | — | December 28, 2003 | Socorro | LINEAR | EUP | 7.1 km | MPC · JPL |
| 206682 | 2003 YQ_{135} | — | December 28, 2003 | Socorro | LINEAR | · | 5.4 km | MPC · JPL |
| 206683 | 2003 YJ_{140} | — | December 28, 2003 | Socorro | LINEAR | · | 2.8 km | MPC · JPL |
| 206684 | 2003 YE_{142} | — | December 28, 2003 | Socorro | LINEAR | BRA | 2.0 km | MPC · JPL |
| 206685 | 2003 YM_{143} | — | December 28, 2003 | Socorro | LINEAR | · | 3.5 km | MPC · JPL |
| 206686 | 2003 YM_{144} | — | December 28, 2003 | Socorro | LINEAR | HOF | 3.7 km | MPC · JPL |
| 206687 | 2003 YC_{148} | — | December 29, 2003 | Socorro | LINEAR | EUN | 2.3 km | MPC · JPL |
| 206688 | 2003 YO_{154} | — | December 29, 2003 | Catalina | CSS | · | 3.6 km | MPC · JPL |
| 206689 | 2003 YK_{155} | — | December 30, 2003 | Socorro | LINEAR | EUP | 5.1 km | MPC · JPL |
| 206690 | 2003 YL_{156} | — | December 16, 2003 | Kitt Peak | Spacewatch | · | 3.0 km | MPC · JPL |
| 206691 | 2003 YP_{156} | — | December 16, 2003 | Kitt Peak | Spacewatch | · | 2.3 km | MPC · JPL |
| 206692 | 2003 YT_{156} | — | December 16, 2003 | Kitt Peak | Spacewatch | · | 2.6 km | MPC · JPL |
| 206693 | 2003 YA_{163} | — | December 17, 2003 | Socorro | LINEAR | fast | 3.1 km | MPC · JPL |
| 206694 | 2003 YJ_{170} | — | December 18, 2003 | Kitt Peak | Spacewatch | · | 3.8 km | MPC · JPL |
| 206695 | 2004 AH_{2} | — | January 13, 2004 | Anderson Mesa | LONEOS | AGN | 1.7 km | MPC · JPL |
| 206696 | 2004 AO_{2} | — | January 13, 2004 | Anderson Mesa | LONEOS | HOF | 4.2 km | MPC · JPL |
| 206697 | 2004 AZ_{8} | — | January 14, 2004 | Palomar | NEAT | · | 6.1 km | MPC · JPL |
| 206698 | 2004 AD_{13} | — | January 13, 2004 | Kitt Peak | Spacewatch | · | 3.4 km | MPC · JPL |
| 206699 | 2004 BZ_{1} | — | January 16, 2004 | Palomar | NEAT | fast | 4.1 km | MPC · JPL |
| 206700 | 2004 BC_{2} | — | January 16, 2004 | Palomar | NEAT | · | 3.1 km | MPC · JPL |

== 206701–206800 ==
back to top

| Designation | | | Discovery | | | Properties | | Ref |
| Permanent | Provisional | Named after | Date | Site | Discoverer(s) | Category | Diam. | Ref |
|---|---|---|---|---|---|---|---|---|
| 206701 | 2004 BD_{3} | — | January 16, 2004 | Palomar | NEAT | · | 5.4 km | MPC · JPL |
| 206702 | 2004 BR_{11} | — | January 16, 2004 | Palomar | NEAT | · | 2.0 km | MPC · JPL |
| 206703 | 2004 BP_{19} | — | January 17, 2004 | Palomar | NEAT | · | 2.9 km | MPC · JPL |
| 206704 | 2004 BJ_{31} | — | January 19, 2004 | Kitt Peak | Spacewatch | URS | 6.7 km | MPC · JPL |
| 206705 | 2004 BH_{33} | — | January 19, 2004 | Kitt Peak | Spacewatch | · | 3.8 km | MPC · JPL |
| 206706 | 2004 BD_{34} | — | January 19, 2004 | Kitt Peak | Spacewatch | · | 3.3 km | MPC · JPL |
| 206707 | 2004 BK_{35} | — | January 19, 2004 | Kitt Peak | Spacewatch | · | 3.5 km | MPC · JPL |
| 206708 | 2004 BS_{35} | — | January 19, 2004 | Kitt Peak | Spacewatch | KOR | 1.7 km | MPC · JPL |
| 206709 | 2004 BW_{36} | — | January 19, 2004 | Kitt Peak | Spacewatch | · | 2.8 km | MPC · JPL |
| 206710 | 2004 BK_{37} | — | January 19, 2004 | Kitt Peak | Spacewatch | · | 4.7 km | MPC · JPL |
| 206711 | 2004 BO_{39} | — | January 21, 2004 | Socorro | LINEAR | · | 5.1 km | MPC · JPL |
| 206712 | 2004 BS_{41} | — | January 19, 2004 | Socorro | LINEAR | BRA | 2.1 km | MPC · JPL |
| 206713 | 2004 BZ_{41} | — | January 19, 2004 | Catalina | CSS | · | 4.3 km | MPC · JPL |
| 206714 | 2004 BK_{47} | — | January 21, 2004 | Socorro | LINEAR | EOS | 2.6 km | MPC · JPL |
| 206715 | 2004 BP_{50} | — | January 21, 2004 | Socorro | LINEAR | · | 5.6 km | MPC · JPL |
| 206716 | 2004 BU_{50} | — | January 21, 2004 | Socorro | LINEAR | · | 3.7 km | MPC · JPL |
| 206717 | 2004 BC_{51} | — | January 21, 2004 | Socorro | LINEAR | · | 6.1 km | MPC · JPL |
| 206718 | 2004 BY_{51} | — | January 21, 2004 | Socorro | LINEAR | · | 3.3 km | MPC · JPL |
| 206719 | 2004 BW_{52} | — | January 21, 2004 | Socorro | LINEAR | · | 4.5 km | MPC · JPL |
| 206720 | 2004 BW_{56} | — | January 23, 2004 | Socorro | LINEAR | · | 3.2 km | MPC · JPL |
| 206721 | 2004 BJ_{58} | — | January 23, 2004 | Socorro | LINEAR | slow | 5.4 km | MPC · JPL |
| 206722 | 2004 BH_{63} | — | January 22, 2004 | Socorro | LINEAR | · | 2.1 km | MPC · JPL |
| 206723 | 2004 BT_{71} | — | January 23, 2004 | Socorro | LINEAR | · | 2.4 km | MPC · JPL |
| 206724 | 2004 BY_{72} | — | January 24, 2004 | Socorro | LINEAR | · | 3.8 km | MPC · JPL |
| 206725 | 2004 BR_{73} | — | January 24, 2004 | Socorro | LINEAR | · | 2.5 km | MPC · JPL |
| 206726 | 2004 BX_{73} | — | January 24, 2004 | Socorro | LINEAR | · | 2.1 km | MPC · JPL |
| 206727 | 2004 BE_{78} | — | January 22, 2004 | Socorro | LINEAR | KOR | 1.8 km | MPC · JPL |
| 206728 | 2004 BP_{78} | — | January 22, 2004 | Socorro | LINEAR | · | 3.8 km | MPC · JPL |
| 206729 | 2004 BL_{80} | — | January 24, 2004 | Socorro | LINEAR | · | 3.3 km | MPC · JPL |
| 206730 | 2004 BM_{90} | — | January 24, 2004 | Socorro | LINEAR | · | 3.9 km | MPC · JPL |
| 206731 | 2004 BP_{99} | — | January 27, 2004 | Kitt Peak | Spacewatch | · | 5.1 km | MPC · JPL |
| 206732 | 2004 BY_{99} | — | January 27, 2004 | Kitt Peak | Spacewatch | THB | 3.7 km | MPC · JPL |
| 206733 | 2004 BG_{101} | — | January 28, 2004 | Kitt Peak | Spacewatch | AGN | 1.6 km | MPC · JPL |
| 206734 | 2004 BD_{112} | — | January 24, 2004 | Socorro | LINEAR | · | 2.4 km | MPC · JPL |
| 206735 | 2004 BP_{118} | — | January 30, 2004 | Kitt Peak | Spacewatch | · | 3.4 km | MPC · JPL |
| 206736 | 2004 BV_{119} | — | January 30, 2004 | Socorro | LINEAR | EOS | 3.0 km | MPC · JPL |
| 206737 | 2004 BC_{120} | — | January 30, 2004 | Catalina | CSS | · | 3.2 km | MPC · JPL |
| 206738 | 2004 BD_{120} | — | January 30, 2004 | Catalina | CSS | · | 2.9 km | MPC · JPL |
| 206739 | 2004 BV_{120} | — | January 31, 2004 | Catalina | CSS | · | 5.4 km | MPC · JPL |
| 206740 | 2004 BH_{124} | — | January 18, 2004 | Palomar | NEAT | · | 2.4 km | MPC · JPL |
| 206741 | 2004 BR_{124} | — | January 16, 2004 | Catalina | CSS | · | 3.3 km | MPC · JPL |
| 206742 | 2004 BY_{124} | — | January 16, 2004 | Palomar | NEAT | TIR | 3.4 km | MPC · JPL |
| 206743 | 2004 BB_{129} | — | January 16, 2004 | Kitt Peak | Spacewatch | · | 3.1 km | MPC · JPL |
| 206744 | 2004 BJ_{135} | — | January 19, 2004 | Kitt Peak | Spacewatch | KOR | 2.1 km | MPC · JPL |
| 206745 | 2004 BR_{139} | — | January 19, 2004 | Kitt Peak | Spacewatch | · | 2.0 km | MPC · JPL |
| 206746 | 2004 BB_{142} | — | January 19, 2004 | Kitt Peak | Spacewatch | KOR | 1.8 km | MPC · JPL |
| 206747 | 2004 BH_{145} | — | January 19, 2004 | Kitt Peak | Spacewatch | KOR | 2.0 km | MPC · JPL |
| 206748 | 2004 BA_{146} | — | January 22, 2004 | Socorro | LINEAR | THM | 3.2 km | MPC · JPL |
| 206749 | 2004 BX_{148} | — | January 16, 2004 | Kitt Peak | Spacewatch | KOR | 2.0 km | MPC · JPL |
| 206750 | 2004 BD_{149} | — | January 16, 2004 | Kitt Peak | Spacewatch | · | 2.4 km | MPC · JPL |
| 206751 | 2004 BJ_{149} | — | January 16, 2004 | Kitt Peak | Spacewatch | · | 2.3 km | MPC · JPL |
| 206752 | 2004 BT_{150} | — | January 17, 2004 | Haleakala | NEAT | EMA | 4.7 km | MPC · JPL |
| 206753 | 2004 BW_{151} | — | January 18, 2004 | Kitt Peak | Spacewatch | · | 3.2 km | MPC · JPL |
| 206754 | 2004 BM_{155} | — | January 28, 2004 | Kitt Peak | Spacewatch | · | 2.0 km | MPC · JPL |
| 206755 | 2004 CJ_{2} | — | February 12, 2004 | Wrightwood | J. W. Young | TIR | 2.4 km | MPC · JPL |
| 206756 | 2004 CF_{5} | — | February 10, 2004 | Palomar | NEAT | · | 4.6 km | MPC · JPL |
| 206757 | 2004 CH_{5} | — | February 10, 2004 | Catalina | CSS | EOS | 3.1 km | MPC · JPL |
| 206758 | 2004 CV_{6} | — | February 11, 2004 | Palomar | NEAT | · | 2.4 km | MPC · JPL |
| 206759 | 2004 CA_{7} | — | February 9, 2004 | Nogales | Tenagra II | KOR | 2.0 km | MPC · JPL |
| 206760 | 2004 CU_{11} | — | February 11, 2004 | Palomar | NEAT | · | 2.9 km | MPC · JPL |
| 206761 | 2004 CU_{13} | — | February 11, 2004 | Palomar | NEAT | EOS | 2.9 km | MPC · JPL |
| 206762 | 2004 CE_{21} | — | February 11, 2004 | Palomar | NEAT | · | 5.9 km | MPC · JPL |
| 206763 | 2004 CV_{21} | — | February 11, 2004 | Palomar | NEAT | · | 3.0 km | MPC · JPL |
| 206764 | 2004 CR_{22} | — | February 12, 2004 | Desert Eagle | W. K. Y. Yeung | EOS | 2.8 km | MPC · JPL |
| 206765 | 2004 CG_{26} | — | February 11, 2004 | Kitt Peak | Spacewatch | · | 2.8 km | MPC · JPL |
| 206766 | 2004 CR_{27} | — | February 12, 2004 | Kitt Peak | Spacewatch | · | 2.5 km | MPC · JPL |
| 206767 | 2004 CM_{30} | — | February 12, 2004 | Kitt Peak | Spacewatch | KOR | 1.3 km | MPC · JPL |
| 206768 | 2004 CT_{43} | — | February 12, 2004 | Palomar | NEAT | GEF | 2.2 km | MPC · JPL |
| 206769 | 2004 CW_{43} | — | February 12, 2004 | Kitt Peak | Spacewatch | · | 3.7 km | MPC · JPL |
| 206770 | 2004 CO_{48} | — | February 14, 2004 | Haleakala | NEAT | · | 4.0 km | MPC · JPL |
| 206771 | 2004 CO_{53} | — | February 11, 2004 | Kitt Peak | Spacewatch | · | 4.1 km | MPC · JPL |
| 206772 | 2004 CM_{63} | — | February 12, 2004 | Palomar | NEAT | · | 3.8 km | MPC · JPL |
| 206773 | 2004 CX_{64} | — | February 13, 2004 | Kitt Peak | Spacewatch | DOR | 4.3 km | MPC · JPL |
| 206774 | 2004 CZ_{64} | — | February 13, 2004 | Kitt Peak | Spacewatch | · | 3.5 km | MPC · JPL |
| 206775 | 2004 CC_{65} | — | February 13, 2004 | Kitt Peak | Spacewatch | · | 3.4 km | MPC · JPL |
| 206776 | 2004 CS_{78} | — | February 11, 2004 | Palomar | NEAT | · | 2.7 km | MPC · JPL |
| 206777 | 2004 CM_{89} | — | February 11, 2004 | Kitt Peak | Spacewatch | EOS | 2.6 km | MPC · JPL |
| 206778 | 2004 CK_{96} | — | February 14, 2004 | Haleakala | NEAT | · | 4.0 km | MPC · JPL |
| 206779 | 2004 CR_{97} | — | February 14, 2004 | Socorro | LINEAR | · | 3.1 km | MPC · JPL |
| 206780 | 2004 CV_{105} | — | February 14, 2004 | Palomar | NEAT | · | 3.0 km | MPC · JPL |
| 206781 | 2004 CS_{109} | — | February 12, 2004 | Palomar | NEAT | · | 6.9 km | MPC · JPL |
| 206782 | 2004 CG_{110} | — | February 14, 2004 | Palomar | NEAT | VER | 4.1 km | MPC · JPL |
| 206783 | 2004 CN_{112} | — | February 13, 2004 | Anderson Mesa | LONEOS | NAE | 4.6 km | MPC · JPL |
| 206784 | 2004 CO_{115} | — | February 2, 2004 | Socorro | LINEAR | · | 3.1 km | MPC · JPL |
| 206785 | 2004 CK_{117} | — | February 11, 2004 | Kitt Peak | Spacewatch | · | 3.7 km | MPC · JPL |
| 206786 | 2004 CP_{125} | — | February 12, 2004 | Kitt Peak | Spacewatch | · | 2.6 km | MPC · JPL |
| 206787 | 2004 DQ | — | February 16, 2004 | Kitt Peak | Spacewatch | · | 2.7 km | MPC · JPL |
| 206788 | 2004 DP_{5} | — | February 16, 2004 | Socorro | LINEAR | H | 820 m | MPC · JPL |
| 206789 | 2004 DN_{7} | — | February 17, 2004 | Kitt Peak | Spacewatch | KOR | 1.8 km | MPC · JPL |
| 206790 | 2004 DD_{13} | — | February 16, 2004 | Catalina | CSS | · | 6.5 km | MPC · JPL |
| 206791 | 2004 DQ_{13} | — | February 16, 2004 | Socorro | LINEAR | · | 3.4 km | MPC · JPL |
| 206792 | 2004 DF_{19} | — | February 16, 2004 | Kitt Peak | Spacewatch | · | 5.2 km | MPC · JPL |
| 206793 | 2004 DW_{23} | — | February 19, 2004 | Socorro | LINEAR | · | 2.3 km | MPC · JPL |
| 206794 | 2004 DU_{30} | — | February 17, 2004 | Socorro | LINEAR | KOR | 2.0 km | MPC · JPL |
| 206795 | 2004 DD_{31} | — | February 17, 2004 | Socorro | LINEAR | EMA | 5.0 km | MPC · JPL |
| 206796 | 2004 DQ_{32} | — | February 18, 2004 | Kitt Peak | Spacewatch | · | 5.3 km | MPC · JPL |
| 206797 | 2004 DL_{37} | — | February 19, 2004 | Socorro | LINEAR | · | 3.9 km | MPC · JPL |
| 206798 | 2004 DV_{39} | — | February 16, 2004 | Kitt Peak | Spacewatch | · | 2.8 km | MPC · JPL |
| 206799 | 2004 DO_{43} | — | February 23, 2004 | Socorro | LINEAR | NAE | 2.9 km | MPC · JPL |
| 206800 | 2004 DA_{44} | — | February 24, 2004 | Haleakala | NEAT | EUP | 8.8 km | MPC · JPL |

== 206801–206900 ==
back to top

| Designation | | | Discovery | | | Properties | | Ref |
| Permanent | Provisional | Named after | Date | Site | Discoverer(s) | Category | Diam. | Ref |
|---|---|---|---|---|---|---|---|---|
| 206801 | 2004 DQ_{48} | — | February 19, 2004 | Socorro | LINEAR | (31811) | 3.6 km | MPC · JPL |
| 206802 | 2004 DF_{49} | — | February 19, 2004 | Socorro | LINEAR | EMA | 4.6 km | MPC · JPL |
| 206803 | 2004 DO_{49} | — | February 20, 2004 | Haleakala | NEAT | · | 3.0 km | MPC · JPL |
| 206804 | 2004 DZ_{49} | — | February 22, 2004 | Kitt Peak | Spacewatch | EOS | 2.7 km | MPC · JPL |
| 206805 | 2004 DJ_{51} | — | February 23, 2004 | Socorro | LINEAR | · | 5.2 km | MPC · JPL |
| 206806 | 2004 DT_{51} | — | February 23, 2004 | Socorro | LINEAR | · | 4.5 km | MPC · JPL |
| 206807 | 2004 DK_{52} | — | February 25, 2004 | Socorro | LINEAR | EOS | 4.4 km | MPC · JPL |
| 206808 | 2004 DU_{55} | — | February 22, 2004 | Kitt Peak | Spacewatch | · | 2.6 km | MPC · JPL |
| 206809 | 2004 DS_{58} | — | February 23, 2004 | Socorro | LINEAR | · | 2.9 km | MPC · JPL |
| 206810 | 2004 DG_{59} | — | February 23, 2004 | Socorro | LINEAR | · | 4.2 km | MPC · JPL |
| 206811 | 2004 DB_{61} | — | February 26, 2004 | Socorro | LINEAR | · | 3.3 km | MPC · JPL |
| 206812 | 2004 DF_{63} | — | February 29, 2004 | Kitt Peak | Spacewatch | KOR | 2.0 km | MPC · JPL |
| 206813 | 2004 DP_{72} | — | February 16, 2004 | Kitt Peak | Spacewatch | · | 5.1 km | MPC · JPL |
| 206814 | 2004 DZ_{78} | — | February 18, 2004 | Haleakala | NEAT | URS | 5.5 km | MPC · JPL |
| 206815 | 2004 EG_{5} | — | March 11, 2004 | Palomar | NEAT | · | 4.6 km | MPC · JPL |
| 206816 | 2004 EZ_{5} | — | March 11, 2004 | Palomar | NEAT | · | 5.8 km | MPC · JPL |
| 206817 | 2004 EW_{8} | — | March 14, 2004 | Kitt Peak | Spacewatch | · | 2.2 km | MPC · JPL |
| 206818 | 2004 EJ_{11} | — | March 10, 2004 | Palomar | NEAT | · | 3.0 km | MPC · JPL |
| 206819 | 2004 EF_{13} | — | March 11, 2004 | Palomar | NEAT | · | 4.8 km | MPC · JPL |
| 206820 | 2004 ET_{13} | — | March 11, 2004 | Palomar | NEAT | · | 3.6 km | MPC · JPL |
| 206821 | 2004 EQ_{14} | — | March 11, 2004 | Palomar | NEAT | · | 5.9 km | MPC · JPL |
| 206822 | 2004 EB_{17} | — | March 12, 2004 | Palomar | NEAT | · | 3.9 km | MPC · JPL |
| 206823 | 2004 EC_{19} | — | March 14, 2004 | Socorro | LINEAR | · | 4.2 km | MPC · JPL |
| 206824 | 2004 EF_{19} | — | March 14, 2004 | Kitt Peak | Spacewatch | EOS | 3.1 km | MPC · JPL |
| 206825 | 2004 EH_{21} | — | March 15, 2004 | Kitt Peak | Spacewatch | · | 3.4 km | MPC · JPL |
| 206826 | 2004 EH_{33} | — | March 15, 2004 | Socorro | LINEAR | · | 4.5 km | MPC · JPL |
| 206827 | 2004 EK_{37} | — | March 14, 2004 | Palomar | NEAT | EUP | 6.5 km | MPC · JPL |
| 206828 | 2004 EO_{38} | — | March 14, 2004 | Kitt Peak | Spacewatch | KOR | 2.3 km | MPC · JPL |
| 206829 | 2004 EC_{40} | — | March 15, 2004 | Socorro | LINEAR | · | 4.7 km | MPC · JPL |
| 206830 | 2004 EV_{41} | — | March 15, 2004 | Catalina | CSS | HYG | 3.7 km | MPC · JPL |
| 206831 | 2004 EY_{45} | — | March 15, 2004 | Kitt Peak | Spacewatch | · | 3.8 km | MPC · JPL |
| 206832 | 2004 EL_{46} | — | March 15, 2004 | Socorro | LINEAR | · | 2.7 km | MPC · JPL |
| 206833 | 2004 EU_{49} | — | March 15, 2004 | Kitt Peak | Spacewatch | · | 5.1 km | MPC · JPL |
| 206834 | 2004 EA_{55} | — | March 14, 2004 | Palomar | NEAT | · | 2.9 km | MPC · JPL |
| 206835 | 2004 EH_{56} | — | March 14, 2004 | Palomar | NEAT | · | 5.1 km | MPC · JPL |
| 206836 | 2004 ET_{61} | — | March 12, 2004 | Palomar | NEAT | HYG | 5.0 km | MPC · JPL |
| 206837 | 2004 ER_{68} | — | March 15, 2004 | Socorro | LINEAR | · | 4.4 km | MPC · JPL |
| 206838 | 2004 EV_{70} | — | March 15, 2004 | Kitt Peak | Spacewatch | THM | 2.6 km | MPC · JPL |
| 206839 | 2004 EX_{71} | — | March 15, 2004 | Kitt Peak | Spacewatch | · | 4.3 km | MPC · JPL |
| 206840 | 2004 EH_{80} | — | March 14, 2004 | Socorro | LINEAR | · | 5.3 km | MPC · JPL |
| 206841 | 2004 ED_{81} | — | March 15, 2004 | Socorro | LINEAR | · | 5.8 km | MPC · JPL |
| 206842 | 2004 EJ_{81} | — | March 15, 2004 | Socorro | LINEAR | · | 5.0 km | MPC · JPL |
| 206843 | 2004 EK_{81} | — | March 15, 2004 | Socorro | LINEAR | · | 3.6 km | MPC · JPL |
| 206844 | 2004 EF_{88} | — | March 14, 2004 | Kitt Peak | Spacewatch | EOS | 2.7 km | MPC · JPL |
| 206845 | 2004 ET_{92} | — | March 15, 2004 | Socorro | LINEAR | EMA | 6.4 km | MPC · JPL |
| 206846 | 2004 EM_{96} | — | March 11, 2004 | Palomar | NEAT | HYG | 3.7 km | MPC · JPL |
| 206847 | 2004 ER_{107} | — | March 15, 2004 | Kitt Peak | Spacewatch | · | 3.1 km | MPC · JPL |
| 206848 | 2004 EY_{112} | — | March 15, 2004 | Kitt Peak | Spacewatch | · | 5.8 km | MPC · JPL |
| 206849 | 2004 FZ_{17} | — | March 28, 2004 | Socorro | LINEAR | T_{j} (2.98) | 8.4 km | MPC · JPL |
| 206850 | 2004 FZ_{20} | — | March 16, 2004 | Catalina | CSS | · | 6.0 km | MPC · JPL |
| 206851 | 2004 FZ_{23} | — | March 17, 2004 | Kitt Peak | Spacewatch | THM | 3.4 km | MPC · JPL |
| 206852 | 2004 FW_{24} | — | March 17, 2004 | Socorro | LINEAR | · | 4.5 km | MPC · JPL |
| 206853 | 2004 FS_{28} | — | March 23, 2004 | Socorro | LINEAR | H | 850 m | MPC · JPL |
| 206854 | 2004 FT_{30} | — | March 29, 2004 | Socorro | LINEAR | H | 980 m | MPC · JPL |
| 206855 | 2004 FS_{31} | — | March 30, 2004 | Socorro | LINEAR | T_{j} (2.99) · EUP | 6.0 km | MPC · JPL |
| 206856 | 2004 FO_{44} | — | March 16, 2004 | Socorro | LINEAR | · | 4.2 km | MPC · JPL |
| 206857 | 2004 FZ_{51} | — | March 19, 2004 | Socorro | LINEAR | · | 2.9 km | MPC · JPL |
| 206858 | 2004 FF_{53} | — | March 16, 2004 | Kitt Peak | Spacewatch | · | 2.4 km | MPC · JPL |
| 206859 | 2004 FC_{55} | — | March 19, 2004 | Kitt Peak | Spacewatch | · | 3.8 km | MPC · JPL |
| 206860 | 2004 FJ_{56} | — | March 16, 2004 | Socorro | LINEAR | · | 1.1 km | MPC · JPL |
| 206861 | 2004 FM_{56} | — | March 16, 2004 | Kitt Peak | Spacewatch | · | 2.7 km | MPC · JPL |
| 206862 | 2004 FF_{63} | — | March 19, 2004 | Socorro | LINEAR | · | 3.1 km | MPC · JPL |
| 206863 | 2004 FJ_{70} | — | March 16, 2004 | Valmeca | Valmeca | · | 5.0 km | MPC · JPL |
| 206864 | 2004 FZ_{78} | — | March 19, 2004 | Kitt Peak | Spacewatch | THM | 3.4 km | MPC · JPL |
| 206865 | 2004 FD_{81} | — | March 16, 2004 | Socorro | LINEAR | · | 7.3 km | MPC · JPL |
| 206866 | 2004 FV_{83} | — | March 18, 2004 | Kitt Peak | Spacewatch | · | 4.8 km | MPC · JPL |
| 206867 | 2004 FZ_{85} | — | March 19, 2004 | Palomar | NEAT | · | 5.5 km | MPC · JPL |
| 206868 | 2004 FB_{88} | — | March 20, 2004 | Kitt Peak | Spacewatch | · | 5.9 km | MPC · JPL |
| 206869 | 2004 FW_{92} | — | March 18, 2004 | Socorro | LINEAR | · | 2.4 km | MPC · JPL |
| 206870 | 2004 FX_{93} | — | March 22, 2004 | Socorro | LINEAR | · | 3.5 km | MPC · JPL |
| 206871 | 2004 FA_{112} | — | March 26, 2004 | Kitt Peak | Spacewatch | · | 3.3 km | MPC · JPL |
| 206872 | 2004 FU_{118} | — | March 22, 2004 | Socorro | LINEAR | · | 4.3 km | MPC · JPL |
| 206873 | 2004 FR_{120} | — | March 23, 2004 | Socorro | LINEAR | · | 5.2 km | MPC · JPL |
| 206874 | 2004 FJ_{121} | — | March 23, 2004 | Socorro | LINEAR | · | 4.0 km | MPC · JPL |
| 206875 | 2004 FS_{124} | — | March 27, 2004 | Socorro | LINEAR | · | 5.4 km | MPC · JPL |
| 206876 | 2004 FH_{126} | — | March 27, 2004 | Socorro | LINEAR | · | 2.6 km | MPC · JPL |
| 206877 | 2004 FF_{139} | — | March 20, 2004 | Anderson Mesa | LONEOS | · | 3.9 km | MPC · JPL |
| 206878 | 2004 FF_{144} | — | March 29, 2004 | Catalina | CSS | · | 7.0 km | MPC · JPL |
| 206879 | 2004 FC_{148} | — | March 17, 2004 | Socorro | LINEAR | · | 5.7 km | MPC · JPL |
| 206880 | 2004 FU_{151} | — | March 17, 2004 | Kitt Peak | Spacewatch | · | 2.6 km | MPC · JPL |
| 206881 | 2004 FJ_{161} | — | March 18, 2004 | Socorro | LINEAR | · | 3.2 km | MPC · JPL |
| 206882 | 2004 GF_{1} | — | April 9, 2004 | Palomar | NEAT | · | 6.1 km | MPC · JPL |
| 206883 | 2004 GN_{2} | — | April 12, 2004 | Socorro | LINEAR | · | 4.8 km | MPC · JPL |
| 206884 | 2004 GZ_{10} | — | April 8, 2004 | Palomar | NEAT | · | 4.2 km | MPC · JPL |
| 206885 | 2004 GC_{12} | — | April 12, 2004 | Catalina | CSS | EUP | 4.6 km | MPC · JPL |
| 206886 | 2004 GJ_{15} | — | April 14, 2004 | Socorro | LINEAR | H | 770 m | MPC · JPL |
| 206887 | 2004 GG_{19} | — | April 15, 2004 | Siding Spring | SSS | · | 820 m | MPC · JPL |
| 206888 | 2004 GC_{21} | — | April 11, 2004 | Palomar | NEAT | · | 3.9 km | MPC · JPL |
| 206889 | 2004 GT_{32} | — | April 12, 2004 | Palomar | NEAT | · | 3.7 km | MPC · JPL |
| 206890 | 2004 GA_{42} | — | April 14, 2004 | Palomar | NEAT | · | 6.4 km | MPC · JPL |
| 206891 | 2004 GT_{44} | — | April 12, 2004 | Kitt Peak | Spacewatch | · | 2.4 km | MPC · JPL |
| 206892 | 2004 GJ_{75} | — | April 15, 2004 | Anderson Mesa | LONEOS | · | 4.5 km | MPC · JPL |
| 206893 | 2004 HZ_{6} | — | April 16, 2004 | Socorro | LINEAR | · | 3.9 km | MPC · JPL |
| 206894 | 2004 HY_{10} | — | April 17, 2004 | Palomar | NEAT | · | 4.9 km | MPC · JPL |
| 206895 | 2004 HW_{16} | — | April 16, 2004 | Palomar | NEAT | · | 5.0 km | MPC · JPL |
| 206896 | 2004 HL_{21} | — | April 16, 2004 | Kitt Peak | Spacewatch | (3460) | 4.2 km | MPC · JPL |
| 206897 | 2004 HJ_{28} | — | April 20, 2004 | Socorro | LINEAR | · | 3.4 km | MPC · JPL |
| 206898 | 2004 HJ_{30} | — | April 21, 2004 | Socorro | LINEAR | · | 3.6 km | MPC · JPL |
| 206899 | 2004 HP_{34} | — | April 17, 2004 | Anderson Mesa | LONEOS | LIX | 5.5 km | MPC · JPL |
| 206900 | 2004 HT_{36} | — | April 22, 2004 | Catalina | CSS | H | 750 m | MPC · JPL |

== 206901–207000 ==
back to top

| Designation | | | Discovery | | | Properties | | Ref |
| Permanent | Provisional | Named after | Date | Site | Discoverer(s) | Category | Diam. | Ref |
|---|---|---|---|---|---|---|---|---|
| 206901 | 2004 HU_{36} | — | April 22, 2004 | Catalina | CSS | · | 4.1 km | MPC · JPL |
| 206902 | 2004 HC_{45} | — | April 21, 2004 | Socorro | LINEAR | · | 3.4 km | MPC · JPL |
| 206903 | 2004 HV_{52} | — | April 24, 2004 | Haleakala | NEAT | · | 6.2 km | MPC · JPL |
| 206904 | 2004 HV_{54} | — | April 21, 2004 | Socorro | LINEAR | · | 4.9 km | MPC · JPL |
| 206905 | 2004 HQ_{71} | — | April 25, 2004 | Socorro | LINEAR | · | 5.4 km | MPC · JPL |
| 206906 | 2004 JZ_{27} | — | May 11, 2004 | Siding Spring | SSS | TIR | 4.6 km | MPC · JPL |
| 206907 | 2004 KA_{14} | — | May 22, 2004 | Catalina | CSS | · | 2.6 km | MPC · JPL |
| 206908 | 2004 NW_{2} | — | July 9, 2004 | Siding Spring | SSS | · | 2.8 km | MPC · JPL |
| 206909 | 2004 NB_{6} | — | July 11, 2004 | Socorro | LINEAR | T_{j} (2.97) | 7.1 km | MPC · JPL |
| 206910 | 2004 NL_{8} | — | July 15, 2004 | Socorro | LINEAR | APO +1km · PHA | 1.2 km | MPC · JPL |
| 206911 | 2004 PE_{14} | — | August 7, 2004 | Palomar | NEAT | · | 1.1 km | MPC · JPL |
| 206912 | 2004 PK_{17} | — | August 8, 2004 | Campo Imperatore | CINEOS | · | 960 m | MPC · JPL |
| 206913 | 2004 PH_{20} | — | August 9, 2004 | Socorro | LINEAR | · | 2.0 km | MPC · JPL |
| 206914 | 2004 PZ_{61} | — | August 9, 2004 | Socorro | LINEAR | · | 1.9 km | MPC · JPL |
| 206915 | 2004 PL_{65} | — | August 10, 2004 | Socorro | LINEAR | · | 1.1 km | MPC · JPL |
| 206916 | 2004 PD_{80} | — | August 9, 2004 | Socorro | LINEAR | PHO | 1.6 km | MPC · JPL |
| 206917 | 2004 PY_{88} | — | August 8, 2004 | Anderson Mesa | LONEOS | V | 1.1 km | MPC · JPL |
| 206918 | 2004 PT_{89} | — | August 10, 2004 | Socorro | LINEAR | · | 940 m | MPC · JPL |
| 206919 | 2004 PS_{94} | — | August 10, 2004 | Anderson Mesa | LONEOS | · | 1.5 km | MPC · JPL |
| 206920 | 2004 PE_{95} | — | August 12, 2004 | Socorro | LINEAR | · | 1.3 km | MPC · JPL |
| 206921 | 2004 PU_{100} | — | August 10, 2004 | Socorro | LINEAR | · | 1.2 km | MPC · JPL |
| 206922 | 2004 PR_{101} | — | August 11, 2004 | Socorro | LINEAR | · | 1.8 km | MPC · JPL |
| 206923 | 2004 PY_{101} | — | August 11, 2004 | Socorro | LINEAR | · | 1.9 km | MPC · JPL |
| 206924 | 2004 PP_{102} | — | August 12, 2004 | Socorro | LINEAR | · | 1.0 km | MPC · JPL |
| 206925 | 2004 PR_{108} | — | August 9, 2004 | Socorro | LINEAR | · | 2.8 km | MPC · JPL |
| 206926 | 2004 PM_{111} | — | August 12, 2004 | Socorro | LINEAR | · | 1.7 km | MPC · JPL |
| 206927 | 2004 QH_{21} | — | August 23, 2004 | Kitt Peak | Spacewatch | · | 960 m | MPC · JPL |
| 206928 | 2004 RC_{13} | — | September 4, 2004 | Palomar | NEAT | · | 1.6 km | MPC · JPL |
| 206929 | 2004 RH_{20} | — | September 7, 2004 | Kitt Peak | Spacewatch | · | 1.1 km | MPC · JPL |
| 206930 | 2004 RU_{30} | — | September 7, 2004 | Socorro | LINEAR | · | 910 m | MPC · JPL |
| 206931 | 2004 RO_{42} | — | September 8, 2004 | Campo Imperatore | CINEOS | MAS | 980 m | MPC · JPL |
| 206932 | 2004 RW_{48} | — | September 8, 2004 | Socorro | LINEAR | · | 1.0 km | MPC · JPL |
| 206933 | 2004 RS_{49} | — | September 8, 2004 | Socorro | LINEAR | V | 1.0 km | MPC · JPL |
| 206934 | 2004 RS_{61} | — | September 8, 2004 | Socorro | LINEAR | · | 820 m | MPC · JPL |
| 206935 | 2004 RZ_{68} | — | September 8, 2004 | Socorro | LINEAR | · | 1.1 km | MPC · JPL |
| 206936 | 2004 RX_{69} | — | September 8, 2004 | Socorro | LINEAR | · | 930 m | MPC · JPL |
| 206937 | 2004 RU_{72} | — | September 8, 2004 | Socorro | LINEAR | · | 1.0 km | MPC · JPL |
| 206938 | 2004 RJ_{76} | — | September 8, 2004 | Socorro | LINEAR | · | 1.4 km | MPC · JPL |
| 206939 | 2004 RP_{82} | — | September 9, 2004 | Socorro | LINEAR | · | 650 m | MPC · JPL |
| 206940 | 2004 RU_{90} | — | September 8, 2004 | Socorro | LINEAR | · | 1.8 km | MPC · JPL |
| 206941 | 2004 RG_{99} | — | September 8, 2004 | Socorro | LINEAR | · | 1.0 km | MPC · JPL |
| 206942 | 2004 RT_{101} | — | September 8, 2004 | Socorro | LINEAR | · | 820 m | MPC · JPL |
| 206943 | 2004 RZ_{167} | — | September 7, 2004 | Palomar | NEAT | · | 880 m | MPC · JPL |
| 206944 | 2004 RK_{170} | — | September 8, 2004 | Palomar | NEAT | · | 1.1 km | MPC · JPL |
| 206945 | 2004 RT_{171} | — | September 9, 2004 | Socorro | LINEAR | · | 1.2 km | MPC · JPL |
| 206946 | 2004 RO_{173} | — | September 9, 2004 | Kitt Peak | Spacewatch | V | 1.0 km | MPC · JPL |
| 206947 | 2004 RU_{178} | — | September 10, 2004 | Socorro | LINEAR | · | 1.5 km | MPC · JPL |
| 206948 | 2004 RJ_{187} | — | September 10, 2004 | Socorro | LINEAR | · | 1.7 km | MPC · JPL |
| 206949 | 2004 RD_{189} | — | September 10, 2004 | Socorro | LINEAR | · | 1.0 km | MPC · JPL |
| 206950 | 2004 RP_{205} | — | September 8, 2004 | Socorro | LINEAR | · | 1.4 km | MPC · JPL |
| 206951 | 2004 RT_{307} | — | September 13, 2004 | Socorro | LINEAR | · | 1 km | MPC · JPL |
| 206952 | 2004 RE_{310} | — | September 13, 2004 | Socorro | LINEAR | · | 1.6 km | MPC · JPL |
| 206953 | 2004 RV_{310} | — | September 13, 2004 | Palomar | NEAT | · | 1.0 km | MPC · JPL |
| 206954 | 2004 RQ_{322} | — | September 13, 2004 | Socorro | LINEAR | · | 1.1 km | MPC · JPL |
| 206955 | 2004 RA_{324} | — | September 13, 2004 | Socorro | LINEAR | · | 1.2 km | MPC · JPL |
| 206956 | 2004 RL_{327} | — | September 13, 2004 | Socorro | LINEAR | (14916) | 5.3 km | MPC · JPL |
| 206957 | 2004 RW_{341} | — | September 11, 2004 | Kitt Peak | Spacewatch | NYS | 1.1 km | MPC · JPL |
| 206958 | 2004 SU_{2} | — | September 17, 2004 | Bergisch Gladbach | W. Bickel | V | 1.0 km | MPC · JPL |
| 206959 | 2004 SQ_{10} | — | September 16, 2004 | Siding Spring | SSS | · | 790 m | MPC · JPL |
| 206960 | 2004 SQ_{19} | — | September 18, 2004 | Socorro | LINEAR | · | 3.2 km | MPC · JPL |
| 206961 | 2004 SN_{30} | — | September 17, 2004 | Socorro | LINEAR | · | 1.0 km | MPC · JPL |
| 206962 | 2004 SG_{32} | — | September 17, 2004 | Socorro | LINEAR | · | 1.0 km | MPC · JPL |
| 206963 | 2004 SV_{33} | — | September 17, 2004 | Socorro | LINEAR | · | 1.2 km | MPC · JPL |
| 206964 | 2004 SE_{41} | — | September 17, 2004 | Kitt Peak | Spacewatch | · | 820 m | MPC · JPL |
| 206965 | 2004 SL_{43} | — | September 18, 2004 | Socorro | LINEAR | · | 1.0 km | MPC · JPL |
| 206966 | 2004 SZ_{46} | — | September 18, 2004 | Socorro | LINEAR | · | 980 m | MPC · JPL |
| 206967 | 2004 SZ_{47} | — | September 18, 2004 | Socorro | LINEAR | · | 1.7 km | MPC · JPL |
| 206968 | 2004 SO_{52} | — | September 18, 2004 | Socorro | LINEAR | · | 1.3 km | MPC · JPL |
| 206969 | 2004 SC_{61} | — | September 22, 2004 | Socorro | LINEAR | · | 970 m | MPC · JPL |
| 206970 | 2004 TL_{15} | — | October 9, 2004 | Socorro | LINEAR | · | 1.1 km | MPC · JPL |
| 206971 | 2004 TP_{47} | — | October 4, 2004 | Kitt Peak | Spacewatch | · | 1.9 km | MPC · JPL |
| 206972 | 2004 TS_{54} | — | October 4, 2004 | Kitt Peak | Spacewatch | NYS | 1.5 km | MPC · JPL |
| 206973 | 2004 TG_{67} | — | October 5, 2004 | Anderson Mesa | LONEOS | · | 1.5 km | MPC · JPL |
| 206974 | 2004 TN_{72} | — | October 6, 2004 | Kitt Peak | Spacewatch | · | 1.8 km | MPC · JPL |
| 206975 | 2004 TE_{79} | — | October 4, 2004 | Anderson Mesa | LONEOS | · | 1.4 km | MPC · JPL |
| 206976 | 2004 TS_{102} | — | October 6, 2004 | Palomar | NEAT | NYS | 1.3 km | MPC · JPL |
| 206977 | 2004 TF_{103} | — | October 6, 2004 | Palomar | NEAT | · | 1.5 km | MPC · JPL |
| 206978 | 2004 TP_{110} | — | October 7, 2004 | Anderson Mesa | LONEOS | MAS | 1.2 km | MPC · JPL |
| 206979 | 2004 TV_{115} | — | October 13, 2004 | Goodricke-Pigott | Goodricke-Pigott | · | 2.1 km | MPC · JPL |
| 206980 | 2004 TM_{117} | — | October 5, 2004 | Anderson Mesa | LONEOS | · | 870 m | MPC · JPL |
| 206981 | 2004 TC_{118} | — | October 5, 2004 | Anderson Mesa | LONEOS | · | 910 m | MPC · JPL |
| 206982 | 2004 TU_{126} | — | October 7, 2004 | Socorro | LINEAR | · | 1.2 km | MPC · JPL |
| 206983 | 2004 TH_{130} | — | October 7, 2004 | Socorro | LINEAR | · | 1.3 km | MPC · JPL |
| 206984 | 2004 TA_{133} | — | October 7, 2004 | Anderson Mesa | LONEOS | · | 1.9 km | MPC · JPL |
| 206985 | 2004 TB_{134} | — | October 7, 2004 | Palomar | NEAT | · | 1.2 km | MPC · JPL |
| 206986 | 2004 TV_{135} | — | October 8, 2004 | Anderson Mesa | LONEOS | V | 800 m | MPC · JPL |
| 206987 | 2004 TE_{138} | — | October 8, 2004 | Palomar | NEAT | · | 1.2 km | MPC · JPL |
| 206988 | 2004 TL_{152} | — | October 6, 2004 | Kitt Peak | Spacewatch | · | 920 m | MPC · JPL |
| 206989 | 2004 TH_{159} | — | October 6, 2004 | Kitt Peak | Spacewatch | · | 1.0 km | MPC · JPL |
| 206990 | 2004 TV_{163} | — | October 6, 2004 | Kitt Peak | Spacewatch | · | 3.4 km | MPC · JPL |
| 206991 | 2004 TZ_{165} | — | October 7, 2004 | Kitt Peak | Spacewatch | · | 1.1 km | MPC · JPL |
| 206992 | 2004 TS_{182} | — | October 7, 2004 | Kitt Peak | Spacewatch | · | 1.7 km | MPC · JPL |
| 206993 | 2004 TF_{191} | — | October 7, 2004 | Kitt Peak | Spacewatch | · | 1.2 km | MPC · JPL |
| 206994 | 2004 TD_{200} | — | October 7, 2004 | Kitt Peak | Spacewatch | · | 870 m | MPC · JPL |
| 206995 | 2004 TB_{203} | — | October 7, 2004 | Kitt Peak | Spacewatch | V | 1.0 km | MPC · JPL |
| 206996 | 2004 TX_{205} | — | October 7, 2004 | Kitt Peak | Spacewatch | · | 1.5 km | MPC · JPL |
| 206997 | 2004 TC_{207} | — | October 7, 2004 | Kitt Peak | Spacewatch | · | 1.4 km | MPC · JPL |
| 206998 | 2004 TP_{207} | — | October 7, 2004 | Kitt Peak | Spacewatch | · | 1.1 km | MPC · JPL |
| 206999 | 2004 TJ_{220} | — | October 6, 2004 | Socorro | LINEAR | · | 1.3 km | MPC · JPL |
| 207000 | 2004 TX_{220} | — | October 7, 2004 | Anderson Mesa | LONEOS | V | 960 m | MPC · JPL |

back to top

== See also ==
- Meanings of minor-planet names: 206001–207000
