= Lucian Walkowicz =

American stellar astronomer

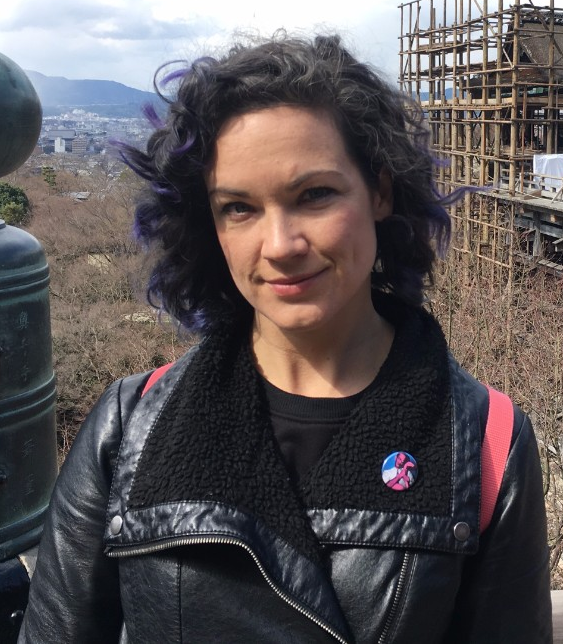
- Lucian Walkowicz in 2017
- Born: 1979 (age 46–47); New York City, U.S.
- Education: Johns Hopkins University; University of Washington
- Spouse: Frank Okay
- Awards: National Academy of Sciences Kavli Fellow (2011); TED Senior Fellow (2012)
- Scientific career
- Fields: Astronomy, performing arts, activism
- Workplaces: UC Berkeley; Princeton University; Adler Planetarium
- Thesis: Self-Consistent Quiescent Model Atmospheres for M Dwarfs (2008)
- Doctoral advisor: Suzanne L. Hawley

Lucian Walkowicz (/ˈwɔːkəwɪtʃ/ WAW-kə-witch; born 1979) is an American astronomer, artist, and activist. They are a lecturer at the School of the Art Institute of Chicago, were based at the Adler Planetarium until 2022 and are noted for their research contributions in stellar magnetic activity and its impact on planetary suitability for extraterrestrial life.

== Career ==
Since 2008, Walkowicz has been the chair of the Large Synoptic Survey Telescope (LSST) Transients and Variable Stars collaboration and is the founding director of the LSST Data Science Fellowship program. They are internationally recognized for their advocacy for conservation of dark night skies, and were named a 2011 National Academy of Sciences Kavli Fellow and a 2012 TED Senior Fellow.

In 2017, Walkowicz was named the fifth Baruch S. Blumberg NASA/Library of Congress Chair in Astrobiology in the John W. Kluge Center at the Library of Congress. They began their tenure October 1, 2017, working on a project titled "Fear of a Green Planet: Inclusive Systems of Thought for Human Exploration of Mars". Their project aims to create an inclusive framework for human exploration of Mars, encompassing both cutting-edge research on Mars as a place of essential astrobiological significance, while weaving in lessons from the diverse histories of exploration on Earth.

Walkowicz holds a BS in physics and astronomy from Johns Hopkins University, and an MS and PhD in astronomy from the University of Washington. As an undergraduate at Johns Hopkins, they got their taste for astronomy while testing detectors for the Hubble Space Telescope’s new camera.

On October 12, 2021, Walkowicz resigned their position on NASA's Astrophysics Advisory Committee over the Agency's terse response to concerns on the naming of the James Webb Space Telescope.

Walkowicz is co-founder of the JustSpace Alliance with Erika Nesvold to "advocate for a more inclusive and ethical future in space, and to harness visions of tomorrow for a more just and equitable world today".

They are co-director of The Discovery and Futures Lab at the SETI institute, and a Lecturer at the School of the Art Institute of Chicago.

=== Public appearances ===
- Walkowicz appeared in Werner Herzog's 2016 documentary Lo and Behold.
- Walkowicz appeared in National Geographic's series MARS.
- Walkowicz appeared in WGN Evening News's 2020 "Christmas Star".
- Walkowicz appeared in Discovery’s 2022 documentary "Last Exit: Space,” directed by Rudolph Herzog

== Awards and honors ==
Asteroid 205599 Walkowicz, discovered by the Sloan Digital Sky Survey in 2001, was named in their honor. The official naming citation was published by the Minor Planet Center on 17 November 2013 (M.P.C. 85914).

== Trademark lawsuit ==
In April 2020 Walkowicz filed a trademark lawsuit against Mattel and one of its subsidiaries, American Girl. The lawsuit alleges that the toy-maker stole Walkowicz's likeness for the Luciana Vega astronaut doll.

== Personal life ==
Walkowicz is non-binary, uses they/them pronouns, and uses the first name, Lucian.

Walkowicz is a movement artist, practicing aerial circus arts including Aerial Silks and Lyra. In 2019, they premiered a piece titled “40 Orbits,” at the Scholastic Art and Writing Awards at Carnegie Hall.
