= List of minor planets: 205001–206000 =

The following is a partial list of minor planets, running from minor-planet number 205001 through 206000, inclusive. The primary data for this and other partial lists is based on JPL's "Small-Body Orbital Elements" and data available from the Minor Planet Center. Critical list information is also provided by the MPC, unless otherwise specified from Lowell Observatory. A detailed description of the table's columns and additional sources are given on the main page including a complete list of every page in this series, and a statistical break-up on the dynamical classification of minor planets.

Also see the summary list of all named bodies in numerical and alphabetical order, and the corresponding naming citations for the number range of this particular list. New namings may only be added to this list after official publication, as the preannouncement of names is condemned by the Working Group for Small Bodies Nomenclature of the International Astronomical Union.

Near-Earth obj.	MBA (inner)	MBA (outer)	Centaur
Mars-crosser	MBA (middle)	Jupiter trojan	Trans-Neptunian obj.
Unclassified

== 205001–205100 ==
Designation			Discovery			Properties		Ref
Permanent	Provisional	Named after	Date	Site	Discoverer(s)	Category	Diam.	Ref
205001	1996 VS_{27}	—	November 11, 1996	Kitt Peak	Spacewatch	THM	2.7 km	MPC · JPL
205002	1996 XZ_{4}	—	December 6, 1996	Kitt Peak	Spacewatch	V	1.0 km	MPC · JPL
205003	1996 XS_{10}	—	December 2, 1996	Kitt Peak	Spacewatch	EOS	2.8 km	MPC · JPL
205004	1997 AG_{10}	—	January 3, 1997	Kitt Peak	Spacewatch	·	1.4 km	MPC · JPL
205005	1997 AD_{12}	—	January 10, 1997	Kitt Peak	Spacewatch	·	1.3 km	MPC · JPL
205006	1997 AY_{21}	—	January 15, 1997	San Marcello	L. Tesi, G. Cattani	·	1.9 km	MPC · JPL
205007	1997 CJ_{16}	—	February 6, 1997	Kitt Peak	Spacewatch	·	1.2 km	MPC · JPL
205008	1997 EP_{6}	—	March 2, 1997	Kitt Peak	Spacewatch	·	1.3 km	MPC · JPL
205009	1997 HJ_{14}	—	April 27, 1997	Kitt Peak	Spacewatch	(5)	2.0 km	MPC · JPL
205010	1997 KN_{1}	—	May 27, 1997	Caussols	ODAS	·	2.4 km	MPC · JPL
205011	1997 LH_{2}	—	June 5, 1997	Kitt Peak	Spacewatch	·	2.5 km	MPC · JPL
205012	1997 LX_{10}	—	June 7, 1997	La Silla	E. W. Elst	·	1.4 km	MPC · JPL
205013	1997 PS_{2}	—	August 11, 1997	Kleť	Kleť	DOR	3.8 km	MPC · JPL
205014	1997 SK_{9}	—	September 27, 1997	Kitt Peak	Spacewatch	·	1.2 km	MPC · JPL
205015	1997 SX_{31}	—	September 28, 1997	Kitt Peak	Spacewatch	KOR	1.6 km	MPC · JPL
205016	1997 TU_{21}	—	October 4, 1997	Kitt Peak	Spacewatch	KOR	1.8 km	MPC · JPL
205017	1997 UN_{6}	—	October 23, 1997	Kitt Peak	Spacewatch	KOR	1.6 km	MPC · JPL
205018	1997 WR_{6}	—	November 23, 1997	Kitt Peak	Spacewatch	·	1.1 km	MPC · JPL
205019	1997 WN_{19}	—	November 24, 1997	Kitt Peak	Spacewatch	·	1.3 km	MPC · JPL
205020	1997 WG_{35}	—	November 29, 1997	Socorro	LINEAR	·	2.8 km	MPC · JPL
205021	1997 YS_{12}	—	December 27, 1997	Kitt Peak	Spacewatch	NYS	1.5 km	MPC · JPL
205022	1998 AW_{4}	—	January 7, 1998	Modra	A. Galád, Pravda, A.	TIR	2.6 km	MPC · JPL
205023	1998 BF_{5}	—	January 18, 1998	Kitt Peak	Spacewatch	TIR	3.2 km	MPC · JPL
205024	1998 BZ_{5}	—	January 22, 1998	Kitt Peak	Spacewatch	·	2.7 km	MPC · JPL
205025	1998 BM_{22}	—	January 23, 1998	Kitt Peak	Spacewatch	·	4.3 km	MPC · JPL
205026	1998 DY_{6}	—	February 17, 1998	Kitt Peak	Spacewatch	·	4.6 km	MPC · JPL
205027	1998 DH_{12}	—	February 23, 1998	Kitt Peak	Spacewatch	NYS	1.4 km	MPC · JPL
205028	1998 EH_{6}	—	March 1, 1998	Caussols	ODAS	·	4.7 km	MPC · JPL
205029	1998 HD_{28}	—	April 22, 1998	Kitt Peak	Spacewatch	ADE	2.7 km	MPC · JPL
205030	1998 HY_{158}	—	April 18, 1998	Kitt Peak	Spacewatch	·	1.8 km	MPC · JPL
205031	1998 MD_{17}	—	June 27, 1998	Kitt Peak	Spacewatch	ADE	3.9 km	MPC · JPL
205032	1998 QO_{51}	—	August 17, 1998	Socorro	LINEAR	·	2.7 km	MPC · JPL
205033	1998 QL_{56}	—	August 30, 1998	Kitt Peak	Spacewatch	·	2.3 km	MPC · JPL
205034	1998 QD_{71}	—	August 24, 1998	Socorro	LINEAR	DOR	4.5 km	MPC · JPL
205035	1998 QD_{84}	—	August 24, 1998	Socorro	LINEAR	·	3.1 km	MPC · JPL
205036	1998 QG_{97}	—	August 24, 1998	Socorro	LINEAR	·	3.8 km	MPC · JPL
205037	1998 RV_{31}	—	September 14, 1998	Socorro	LINEAR	·	1.1 km	MPC · JPL
205038	1998 RA_{32}	—	September 14, 1998	Socorro	LINEAR	·	2.1 km	MPC · JPL
205039	1998 SP_{13}	—	September 21, 1998	Caussols	ODAS	DOR	4.9 km	MPC · JPL
205040	1998 SO_{47}	—	September 26, 1998	Kitt Peak	Spacewatch	HOF	3.3 km	MPC · JPL
205041	1998 SD_{88}	—	September 26, 1998	Socorro	LINEAR	·	3.1 km	MPC · JPL
205042	1998 SQ_{96}	—	September 26, 1998	Socorro	LINEAR	·	2.0 km	MPC · JPL
205043	1998 SS_{125}	—	September 26, 1998	Socorro	LINEAR	RAF	1.5 km	MPC · JPL
205044	1998 TM_{4}	—	October 13, 1998	Kitt Peak	Spacewatch	·	2.0 km	MPC · JPL
205045	1998 TD_{21}	—	October 13, 1998	Kitt Peak	Spacewatch	·	4.9 km	MPC · JPL
205046	1998 UE_{10}	—	October 16, 1998	Kitt Peak	Spacewatch	·	4.0 km	MPC · JPL
205047	1998 UE_{50}	—	October 18, 1998	Anderson Mesa	LONEOS	·	2.8 km	MPC · JPL
205048	1998 WN_{25}	—	November 16, 1998	Kitt Peak	Spacewatch	(13314)	2.9 km	MPC · JPL
205049	1998 WE_{40}	—	November 23, 1998	Kitt Peak	Spacewatch	·	1.4 km	MPC · JPL
205050	1999 AO_{33}	—	January 15, 1999	Kitt Peak	Spacewatch	·	5.0 km	MPC · JPL
205051	1999 CO_{58}	—	February 10, 1999	Socorro	LINEAR	·	1.6 km	MPC · JPL
205052	1999 CP_{142}	—	February 10, 1999	Kitt Peak	Spacewatch	KOR	2.1 km	MPC · JPL
205053	1999 CW_{148}	—	February 10, 1999	Kitt Peak	Spacewatch	·	3.6 km	MPC · JPL
205054	1999 FV_{2}	—	March 16, 1999	Kitt Peak	Spacewatch	·	1.3 km	MPC · JPL
205055	1999 GV_{46}	—	April 6, 1999	Anderson Mesa	LONEOS	·	5.9 km	MPC · JPL
205056	1999 JR_{7}	—	May 8, 1999	Catalina	CSS	TIR	2.9 km	MPC · JPL
205057	1999 JW_{44}	—	May 10, 1999	Socorro	LINEAR	·	1.4 km	MPC · JPL
205058	1999 JD_{69}	—	May 12, 1999	Socorro	LINEAR	·	1.3 km	MPC · JPL
205059	1999 JA_{128}	—	May 10, 1999	Socorro	LINEAR	·	1.3 km	MPC · JPL
205060	1999 LB_{9}	—	June 8, 1999	Socorro	LINEAR	·	3.4 km	MPC · JPL
205061	1999 RC_{15}	—	September 7, 1999	Socorro	LINEAR	·	1.3 km	MPC · JPL
205062	1999 RH_{29}	—	September 8, 1999	Socorro	LINEAR	T_{j} (2.92)	5.5 km	MPC · JPL
205063	1999 RD_{39}	—	September 13, 1999	Kleť	Kleť	·	4.0 km	MPC · JPL
205064	1999 RL_{44}	—	September 7, 1999	Socorro	LINEAR	·	2.3 km	MPC · JPL
205065	1999 RV_{63}	—	September 7, 1999	Socorro	LINEAR	·	2.0 km	MPC · JPL
205066	1999 RF_{78}	—	September 7, 1999	Socorro	LINEAR	·	2.2 km	MPC · JPL
205067	1999 RF_{87}	—	September 7, 1999	Socorro	LINEAR	·	2.4 km	MPC · JPL
205068	1999 RN_{94}	—	September 7, 1999	Socorro	LINEAR	(5)	1.9 km	MPC · JPL
205069	1999 RF_{101}	—	September 8, 1999	Socorro	LINEAR	EUN	2.3 km	MPC · JPL
205070	1999 RP_{104}	—	September 8, 1999	Socorro	LINEAR	T_{j} (2.94)	9.9 km	MPC · JPL
205071	1999 RX_{105}	—	September 8, 1999	Socorro	LINEAR	·	2.8 km	MPC · JPL
205072	1999 RE_{129}	—	September 9, 1999	Socorro	LINEAR	NYS	3.3 km	MPC · JPL
205073	1999 RO_{157}	—	September 9, 1999	Socorro	LINEAR	·	3.4 km	MPC · JPL
205074	1999 RL_{213}	—	September 13, 1999	Bergisch Gladbach	W. Bickel	·	1.5 km	MPC · JPL
205075	1999 RU_{218}	—	September 5, 1999	Anderson Mesa	LONEOS	·	1.9 km	MPC · JPL
205076	1999 RL_{238}	—	September 8, 1999	Catalina	CSS	·	1.9 km	MPC · JPL
205077	1999 RO_{246}	—	September 7, 1999	Anderson Mesa	LONEOS	·	3.6 km	MPC · JPL
205078	1999 SM_{2}	—	September 16, 1999	Uccle	T. Pauwels, Ipatov, S.	·	1.2 km	MPC · JPL
205079	1999 SV_{15}	—	September 30, 1999	Catalina	CSS	·	1.8 km	MPC · JPL
205080	1999 SA_{19}	—	September 30, 1999	Socorro	LINEAR	·	2.2 km	MPC · JPL
205081	1999 TX_{14}	—	October 12, 1999	Fountain Hills	C. W. Juels	·	3.2 km	MPC · JPL
205082	1999 TM_{15}	—	October 12, 1999	Ondřejov	P. Kušnirák, P. Pravec	·	1.1 km	MPC · JPL
205083	1999 TU_{22}	—	October 3, 1999	Kitt Peak	Spacewatch	·	1.2 km	MPC · JPL
205084	1999 TD_{23}	—	October 3, 1999	Kitt Peak	Spacewatch	·	1.2 km	MPC · JPL
205085	1999 TQ_{32}	—	October 4, 1999	Socorro	LINEAR	·	2.1 km	MPC · JPL
205086	1999 TT_{33}	—	October 4, 1999	Socorro	LINEAR	·	2.0 km	MPC · JPL
205087	1999 TW_{67}	—	October 8, 1999	Kitt Peak	Spacewatch	MAS	1.2 km	MPC · JPL
205088	1999 TC_{82}	—	October 12, 1999	Kitt Peak	Spacewatch	(5)	2.1 km	MPC · JPL
205089	1999 TZ_{128}	—	October 6, 1999	Socorro	LINEAR	·	1.1 km	MPC · JPL
205090	1999 TJ_{131}	—	October 6, 1999	Socorro	LINEAR	·	2.4 km	MPC · JPL
205091	1999 TS_{135}	—	October 6, 1999	Socorro	LINEAR	·	1.4 km	MPC · JPL
205092	1999 TJ_{146}	—	October 7, 1999	Socorro	LINEAR	·	1.7 km	MPC · JPL
205093	1999 TY_{158}	—	October 9, 1999	Socorro	LINEAR	·	4.3 km	MPC · JPL
205094	1999 TD_{162}	—	October 9, 1999	Socorro	LINEAR	·	1.8 km	MPC · JPL
205095	1999 TH_{167}	—	October 10, 1999	Socorro	LINEAR	·	1.5 km	MPC · JPL
205096	1999 TX_{172}	—	October 10, 1999	Socorro	LINEAR	·	1.6 km	MPC · JPL
205097	1999 TW_{176}	—	October 10, 1999	Socorro	LINEAR	·	1.9 km	MPC · JPL
205098	1999 TU_{179}	—	October 10, 1999	Socorro	LINEAR	·	1.4 km	MPC · JPL
205099	1999 TX_{209}	—	October 14, 1999	Socorro	LINEAR	·	2.4 km	MPC · JPL
205100	1999 TE_{214}	—	October 15, 1999	Socorro	LINEAR	·	1.3 km	MPC · JPL

== 205101–205200 ==
back to top

Designation			Discovery			Properties		Ref
Permanent	Provisional	Named after	Date	Site	Discoverer(s)	Category	Diam.	Ref
205101	1999 TE_{218}	—	October 15, 1999	Socorro	LINEAR	·	2.2 km	MPC · JPL
205102	1999 TC_{223}	—	October 3, 1999	Catalina	CSS	·	3.5 km	MPC · JPL
205103	1999 TH_{226}	—	October 3, 1999	Kitt Peak	Spacewatch	·	1.8 km	MPC · JPL
205104	1999 TZ_{227}	—	October 1, 1999	Kitt Peak	Spacewatch	3:2	5.3 km	MPC · JPL
205105	1999 TC_{234}	—	October 3, 1999	Kitt Peak	Spacewatch	·	1.7 km	MPC · JPL
205106	1999 TQ_{260}	—	October 11, 1999	Kitt Peak	Spacewatch	·	2.2 km	MPC · JPL
205107	1999 TP_{267}	—	October 3, 1999	Socorro	LINEAR	EUN	1.8 km	MPC · JPL
205108	1999 TK_{279}	—	October 7, 1999	Socorro	LINEAR	·	2.2 km	MPC · JPL
205109	1999 UW_{32}	—	October 31, 1999	Kitt Peak	Spacewatch	·	1.9 km	MPC · JPL
205110	1999 UE_{33}	—	October 31, 1999	Kitt Peak	Spacewatch	(5)	1.1 km	MPC · JPL
205111	1999 UQ_{40}	—	October 16, 1999	Kitt Peak	Spacewatch	NYS	2.2 km	MPC · JPL
205112	1999 UQ_{52}	—	October 31, 1999	Catalina	CSS	fast	2.2 km	MPC · JPL
205113	1999 VN_{4}	—	November 1, 1999	Catalina	CSS	(5)	3.3 km	MPC · JPL
205114	1999 VQ_{8}	—	November 8, 1999	Oizumi	T. Kobayashi	·	3.2 km	MPC · JPL
205115	1999 VP_{17}	—	November 2, 1999	Kitt Peak	Spacewatch	·	1.4 km	MPC · JPL
205116	1999 VF_{20}	—	November 12, 1999	Višnjan	K. Korlević	·	2.1 km	MPC · JPL
205117	1999 VK_{42}	—	November 4, 1999	Kitt Peak	Spacewatch	fast	1.8 km	MPC · JPL
205118	1999 VB_{67}	—	November 4, 1999	Socorro	LINEAR	·	2.4 km	MPC · JPL
205119	1999 VO_{71}	—	November 4, 1999	Socorro	LINEAR	·	1.9 km	MPC · JPL
205120	1999 VQ_{82}	—	November 5, 1999	Socorro	LINEAR	·	2.4 km	MPC · JPL
205121	1999 VL_{83}	—	November 2, 1999	Kitt Peak	Spacewatch	·	4.6 km	MPC · JPL
205122	1999 VE_{92}	—	November 9, 1999	Socorro	LINEAR	·	3.8 km	MPC · JPL
205123	1999 VR_{92}	—	November 9, 1999	Socorro	LINEAR	·	2.0 km	MPC · JPL
205124	1999 VC_{94}	—	November 9, 1999	Socorro	LINEAR	(5)	1.7 km	MPC · JPL
205125	1999 VD_{102}	—	November 9, 1999	Socorro	LINEAR	·	2.6 km	MPC · JPL
205126	1999 VH_{129}	—	November 11, 1999	Kitt Peak	Spacewatch	(5)	1.4 km	MPC · JPL
205127	1999 VF_{147}	—	November 12, 1999	Socorro	LINEAR	·	1.3 km	MPC · JPL
205128	1999 VV_{152}	—	November 10, 1999	Kitt Peak	Spacewatch	·	2.4 km	MPC · JPL
205129	1999 VO_{157}	—	November 14, 1999	Socorro	LINEAR	·	2.3 km	MPC · JPL
205130	1999 VO_{159}	—	November 14, 1999	Socorro	LINEAR	·	1.3 km	MPC · JPL
205131	1999 VL_{166}	—	November 14, 1999	Socorro	LINEAR	·	1.6 km	MPC · JPL
205132	1999 VJ_{168}	—	November 14, 1999	Socorro	LINEAR	·	1.7 km	MPC · JPL
205133	1999 VK_{171}	—	November 14, 1999	Socorro	LINEAR	·	2.4 km	MPC · JPL
205134	1999 VQ_{181}	—	November 9, 1999	Socorro	LINEAR	3:2 · SHU	5.3 km	MPC · JPL
205135	1999 VM_{183}	—	November 12, 1999	Socorro	LINEAR	·	4.3 km	MPC · JPL
205136	1999 VM_{193}	—	November 1, 1999	Kitt Peak	Spacewatch	·	1.7 km	MPC · JPL
205137	1999 VG_{198}	—	November 3, 1999	Catalina	CSS	·	2.6 km	MPC · JPL
205138	1999 VP_{201}	—	November 3, 1999	Socorro	LINEAR	·	2.3 km	MPC · JPL
205139	1999 VW_{221}	—	November 3, 1999	Kitt Peak	Spacewatch	(5)	1.6 km	MPC · JPL
205140	1999 WC_{11}	—	November 30, 1999	Kitt Peak	Spacewatch	·	2.5 km	MPC · JPL
205141	1999 WR_{14}	—	November 28, 1999	Kitt Peak	Spacewatch	AST	2.9 km	MPC · JPL
205142	1999 WQ_{15}	—	November 29, 1999	Kitt Peak	Spacewatch	(5)	1.2 km	MPC · JPL
205143	1999 WD_{18}	—	November 30, 1999	Kitt Peak	Spacewatch	·	1.8 km	MPC · JPL
205144	1999 XX_{9}	—	December 5, 1999	Kitt Peak	Spacewatch	·	1.7 km	MPC · JPL
205145	1999 XK_{36}	—	December 6, 1999	Višnjan	K. Korlević	·	3.2 km	MPC · JPL
205146	1999 XC_{43}	—	December 7, 1999	Socorro	LINEAR	·	3.2 km	MPC · JPL
205147	1999 XR_{53}	—	December 7, 1999	Socorro	LINEAR	·	1.9 km	MPC · JPL
205148	1999 XR_{89}	—	December 7, 1999	Socorro	LINEAR	EUN	2.1 km	MPC · JPL
205149	1999 XS_{110}	—	December 5, 1999	Catalina	CSS	(5)	2.3 km	MPC · JPL
205150	1999 XD_{124}	—	December 7, 1999	Catalina	CSS	·	1.5 km	MPC · JPL
205151	1999 XE_{147}	—	December 7, 1999	Kitt Peak	Spacewatch	·	1.2 km	MPC · JPL
205152	1999 XK_{156}	—	December 8, 1999	Socorro	LINEAR	·	2.6 km	MPC · JPL
205153	1999 XV_{186}	—	December 12, 1999	Socorro	LINEAR	(1547)	2.3 km	MPC · JPL
205154	1999 XP_{187}	—	December 12, 1999	Socorro	LINEAR	·	3.0 km	MPC · JPL
205155	1999 XE_{197}	—	December 12, 1999	Socorro	LINEAR	·	2.1 km	MPC · JPL
205156	1999 XM_{199}	—	December 12, 1999	Socorro	LINEAR	·	3.1 km	MPC · JPL
205157	1999 XL_{223}	—	December 13, 1999	Kitt Peak	Spacewatch	·	2.4 km	MPC · JPL
205158	1999 XR_{234}	—	December 3, 1999	Anderson Mesa	LONEOS	(5)	2.1 km	MPC · JPL
205159	1999 XE_{236}	—	December 4, 1999	Catalina	CSS	·	2.6 km	MPC · JPL
205160	1999 XT_{238}	—	December 5, 1999	Catalina	CSS	·	1.8 km	MPC · JPL
205161	1999 XU_{254}	—	December 12, 1999	Kitt Peak	Spacewatch	(13314)	1.9 km	MPC · JPL
205162	2000 AV_{44}	—	January 5, 2000	Kitt Peak	Spacewatch	WIT	1.5 km	MPC · JPL
205163	2000 AK_{133}	—	January 3, 2000	Socorro	LINEAR	·	6.9 km	MPC · JPL
205164	2000 AC_{134}	—	January 4, 2000	Socorro	LINEAR	·	2.2 km	MPC · JPL
205165	2000 AS_{149}	—	January 7, 2000	Socorro	LINEAR	·	5.8 km	MPC · JPL
205166	2000 AL_{168}	—	January 13, 2000	Kleť	Kleť	·	2.4 km	MPC · JPL
205167	2000 AR_{196}	—	January 8, 2000	Socorro	LINEAR	·	3.9 km	MPC · JPL
205168	2000 AC_{214}	—	January 6, 2000	Kitt Peak	Spacewatch	·	4.3 km	MPC · JPL
205169	2000 AV_{215}	—	January 7, 2000	Kitt Peak	Spacewatch	·	2.3 km	MPC · JPL
205170	2000 AH_{218}	—	January 8, 2000	Kitt Peak	Spacewatch	·	2.3 km	MPC · JPL
205171	2000 AB_{232}	—	January 4, 2000	Socorro	LINEAR	·	2.0 km	MPC · JPL
205172	2000 AY_{232}	—	January 4, 2000	Socorro	LINEAR	·	2.6 km	MPC · JPL
205173	2000 AS_{238}	—	January 6, 2000	Socorro	LINEAR	·	3.6 km	MPC · JPL
205174	2000 BO	—	January 16, 2000	Višnjan	K. Korlević	·	2.9 km	MPC · JPL
205175	2000 BL_{5}	—	January 27, 2000	Socorro	LINEAR	·	2.6 km	MPC · JPL
205176	2000 BV_{21}	—	January 29, 2000	Kitt Peak	Spacewatch	·	3.6 km	MPC · JPL
205177	2000 CU_{3}	—	February 2, 2000	Socorro	LINEAR	·	2.8 km	MPC · JPL
205178	2000 CC_{12}	—	February 2, 2000	Socorro	LINEAR	·	2.4 km	MPC · JPL
205179	2000 CG_{17}	—	February 2, 2000	Socorro	LINEAR	EUN	2.3 km	MPC · JPL
205180	2000 CG_{74}	—	February 7, 2000	Kitt Peak	Spacewatch	·	2.6 km	MPC · JPL
205181	2000 CS_{82}	—	February 4, 2000	Socorro	LINEAR	·	3.4 km	MPC · JPL
205182	2000 CR_{110}	—	February 6, 2000	Socorro	LINEAR	·	4.0 km	MPC · JPL
205183	2000 CM_{113}	—	February 10, 2000	Kitt Peak	Spacewatch	·	2.8 km	MPC · JPL
205184	2000 DC_{4}	—	February 28, 2000	Socorro	LINEAR	·	3.5 km	MPC · JPL
205185	2000 DO_{6}	—	February 28, 2000	Socorro	LINEAR	·	4.7 km	MPC · JPL
205186	2000 DZ_{10}	—	February 26, 2000	Kitt Peak	Spacewatch	HOF	3.0 km	MPC · JPL
205187	2000 DT_{18}	—	February 29, 2000	Socorro	LINEAR	HNS	2.2 km	MPC · JPL
205188	2000 DR_{42}	—	February 29, 2000	Socorro	LINEAR	·	2.7 km	MPC · JPL
205189	2000 DH_{46}	—	February 29, 2000	Socorro	LINEAR	·	2.6 km	MPC · JPL
205190	2000 DH_{47}	—	February 29, 2000	Socorro	LINEAR	·	2.5 km	MPC · JPL
205191	2000 DK_{47}	—	February 29, 2000	Socorro	LINEAR	AGN	1.7 km	MPC · JPL
205192	2000 DS_{62}	—	February 29, 2000	Socorro	LINEAR	·	2.2 km	MPC · JPL
205193	2000 DO_{68}	—	February 29, 2000	Socorro	LINEAR	·	2.8 km	MPC · JPL
205194	2000 ES_{5}	—	March 2, 2000	Kitt Peak	Spacewatch	·	3.6 km	MPC · JPL
205195	2000 EN_{56}	—	March 8, 2000	Socorro	LINEAR	·	3.6 km	MPC · JPL
205196	2000 EC_{71}	—	March 9, 2000	Kitt Peak	Spacewatch	HOF	4.3 km	MPC · JPL
205197	2000 EX_{81}	—	March 5, 2000	Socorro	LINEAR	(18466)	3.1 km	MPC · JPL
205198	2000 ES_{98}	—	March 10, 2000	Kitt Peak	Spacewatch	·	2.5 km	MPC · JPL
205199	2000 ED_{117}	—	March 10, 2000	Socorro	LINEAR	·	4.6 km	MPC · JPL
205200	2000 EU_{122}	—	March 11, 2000	Socorro	LINEAR	·	2.6 km	MPC · JPL

== 205201–205300 ==
back to top

Designation			Discovery			Properties		Ref
Permanent	Provisional	Named after	Date	Site	Discoverer(s)	Category	Diam.	Ref
205201	2000 EG_{138}	—	March 11, 2000	Socorro	LINEAR	·	2.9 km	MPC · JPL
205202	2000 ES_{164}	—	March 3, 2000	Socorro	LINEAR	·	2.7 km	MPC · JPL
205203	2000 EQ_{174}	—	March 6, 2000	Haleakala	NEAT	·	3.0 km	MPC · JPL
205204	2000 EO_{178}	—	March 4, 2000	Socorro	LINEAR	·	2.1 km	MPC · JPL
205205	2000 FA_{1}	—	March 26, 2000	Prescott	P. G. Comba	KOR	2.6 km	MPC · JPL
205206	2000 GU_{30}	—	April 5, 2000	Socorro	LINEAR	·	4.4 km	MPC · JPL
205207	2000 GB_{40}	—	April 5, 2000	Socorro	LINEAR	·	3.5 km	MPC · JPL
205208	2000 GG_{43}	—	April 5, 2000	Socorro	LINEAR	·	3.2 km	MPC · JPL
205209	2000 GA_{61}	—	April 5, 2000	Socorro	LINEAR	·	2.4 km	MPC · JPL
205210	2000 GK_{86}	—	April 4, 2000	Socorro	LINEAR	·	4.3 km	MPC · JPL
205211	2000 GJ_{133}	—	April 7, 2000	Socorro	LINEAR	·	4.6 km	MPC · JPL
205212	2000 HW_{8}	—	April 27, 2000	Socorro	LINEAR	·	2.8 km	MPC · JPL
205213	2000 HC_{32}	—	April 29, 2000	Socorro	LINEAR	·	1.5 km	MPC · JPL
205214	2000 JG_{67}	—	May 4, 2000	Kitt Peak	Spacewatch	·	2.3 km	MPC · JPL
205215	2000 JH_{94}	—	May 4, 2000	Apache Point	SDSS	·	3.7 km	MPC · JPL
205216	2000 MU_{2}	—	June 27, 2000	Bergisch Gladbach	W. Bickel	·	3.0 km	MPC · JPL
205217	2000 ON_{40}	—	July 30, 2000	Socorro	LINEAR	EUP	7.1 km	MPC · JPL
205218	2000 OB_{46}	—	July 30, 2000	Socorro	LINEAR	·	3.3 km	MPC · JPL
205219	2000 OA_{56}	—	July 29, 2000	Anderson Mesa	LONEOS	·	2.0 km	MPC · JPL
205220	2000 PP_{27}	—	August 5, 2000	Prescott	P. G. Comba	·	4.2 km	MPC · JPL
205221	2000 QS_{31}	—	August 26, 2000	Socorro	LINEAR	·	2.0 km	MPC · JPL
205222	2000 QV_{43}	—	August 24, 2000	Socorro	LINEAR	·	2.0 km	MPC · JPL
205223	2000 QQ_{52}	—	August 24, 2000	Socorro	LINEAR	·	4.8 km	MPC · JPL
205224	2000 QT_{54}	—	August 25, 2000	Socorro	LINEAR	·	2.1 km	MPC · JPL
205225	2000 QK_{60}	—	August 26, 2000	Socorro	LINEAR	V	930 m	MPC · JPL
205226	2000 QS_{71}	—	August 24, 2000	Socorro	LINEAR	·	2.1 km	MPC · JPL
205227	2000 QV_{75}	—	August 24, 2000	Socorro	LINEAR	·	4.0 km	MPC · JPL
205228	2000 QH_{100}	—	August 28, 2000	Socorro	LINEAR	·	2.1 km	MPC · JPL
205229	2000 QK_{103}	—	August 28, 2000	Socorro	LINEAR	slow	2.4 km	MPC · JPL
205230	2000 QW_{103}	—	August 28, 2000	Socorro	LINEAR	NYS	1.6 km	MPC · JPL
205231	2000 QY_{110}	—	August 24, 2000	Socorro	LINEAR	(2076)	840 m	MPC · JPL
205232	2000 QF_{115}	—	August 25, 2000	Socorro	LINEAR	·	1.2 km	MPC · JPL
205233	2000 QO_{118}	—	August 25, 2000	Socorro	LINEAR	·	1.5 km	MPC · JPL
205234	2000 QZ_{120}	—	August 25, 2000	Socorro	LINEAR	·	1.6 km	MPC · JPL
205235	2000 QH_{129}	—	August 31, 2000	Socorro	LINEAR	NYS	1.6 km	MPC · JPL
205236	2000 QB_{131}	—	August 24, 2000	Socorro	LINEAR	·	1.5 km	MPC · JPL
205237	2000 QQ_{160}	—	August 31, 2000	Socorro	LINEAR	·	1.2 km	MPC · JPL
205238	2000 QU_{161}	—	August 31, 2000	Socorro	LINEAR	·	1.3 km	MPC · JPL
205239	2000 QV_{173}	—	August 31, 2000	Socorro	LINEAR	·	1.4 km	MPC · JPL
205240	2000 QT_{175}	—	August 31, 2000	Socorro	LINEAR	·	1.4 km	MPC · JPL
205241	2000 QV_{177}	—	August 31, 2000	Socorro	LINEAR	·	2.7 km	MPC · JPL
205242	2000 QQ_{185}	—	August 26, 2000	Socorro	LINEAR	·	2.8 km	MPC · JPL
205243	2000 QT_{185}	—	August 26, 2000	Socorro	LINEAR	·	2.1 km	MPC · JPL
205244	2000 QA_{189}	—	August 26, 2000	Socorro	LINEAR	·	2.4 km	MPC · JPL
205245	2000 QR_{192}	—	August 26, 2000	Socorro	LINEAR	·	1.2 km	MPC · JPL
205246	2000 QA_{201}	—	August 29, 2000	Socorro	LINEAR	NYS	1.7 km	MPC · JPL
205247	2000 QD_{203}	—	August 29, 2000	Socorro	LINEAR	NYS ·	2.3 km	MPC · JPL
205248	2000 QT_{203}	—	August 29, 2000	Socorro	LINEAR	·	5.2 km	MPC · JPL
205249	2000 QY_{204}	—	August 31, 2000	Socorro	LINEAR	·	1.3 km	MPC · JPL
205250	2000 QV_{206}	—	August 31, 2000	Socorro	LINEAR	MAS	980 m	MPC · JPL
205251	2000 QT_{211}	—	August 31, 2000	Socorro	LINEAR	·	1.6 km	MPC · JPL
205252	2000 QH_{221}	—	August 21, 2000	Anderson Mesa	LONEOS	·	1.5 km	MPC · JPL
205253	2000 RH_{42}	—	September 3, 2000	Socorro	LINEAR	·	1.9 km	MPC · JPL
205254	2000 RP_{43}	—	September 3, 2000	Socorro	LINEAR	·	2.5 km	MPC · JPL
205255	2000 RY_{46}	—	September 3, 2000	Socorro	LINEAR	·	2.4 km	MPC · JPL
205256	2000 RS_{78}	—	September 8, 2000	Kitt Peak	Spacewatch	·	1.5 km	MPC · JPL
205257	2000 RT_{78}	—	September 9, 2000	Kleť	Kleť	·	1.6 km	MPC · JPL
205258	2000 RO_{83}	—	September 1, 2000	Socorro	LINEAR	·	1.4 km	MPC · JPL
205259	2000 RA_{89}	—	September 3, 2000	Socorro	LINEAR	·	2.5 km	MPC · JPL
205260	2000 RO_{93}	—	September 4, 2000	Anderson Mesa	LONEOS	·	910 m	MPC · JPL
205261	2000 RR_{100}	—	September 5, 2000	Anderson Mesa	LONEOS	PHO	2.7 km	MPC · JPL
205262	2000 SJ_{16}	—	September 23, 2000	Socorro	LINEAR	V	1.0 km	MPC · JPL
205263	2000 ST_{30}	—	September 24, 2000	Socorro	LINEAR	·	1.6 km	MPC · JPL
205264	2000 SV_{33}	—	September 24, 2000	Socorro	LINEAR	·	1.1 km	MPC · JPL
205265	2000 SB_{38}	—	September 24, 2000	Socorro	LINEAR	·	1.7 km	MPC · JPL
205266	2000 SM_{51}	—	September 23, 2000	Socorro	LINEAR	·	1.0 km	MPC · JPL
205267	2000 SE_{55}	—	September 24, 2000	Socorro	LINEAR	·	1.5 km	MPC · JPL
205268	2000 SG_{55}	—	September 24, 2000	Socorro	LINEAR	MAS	930 m	MPC · JPL
205269	2000 SN_{56}	—	September 24, 2000	Socorro	LINEAR	NYS	1.5 km	MPC · JPL
205270	2000 SM_{65}	—	September 24, 2000	Socorro	LINEAR	V	980 m	MPC · JPL
205271	2000 SM_{70}	—	September 24, 2000	Socorro	LINEAR	·	1.7 km	MPC · JPL
205272	2000 SG_{76}	—	September 24, 2000	Socorro	LINEAR	NYS	1.5 km	MPC · JPL
205273	2000 SD_{81}	—	September 24, 2000	Socorro	LINEAR	·	1.6 km	MPC · JPL
205274	2000 SC_{87}	—	September 24, 2000	Socorro	LINEAR	·	2.2 km	MPC · JPL
205275	2000 SD_{96}	—	September 23, 2000	Socorro	LINEAR	·	1.9 km	MPC · JPL
205276	2000 SY_{97}	—	September 23, 2000	Socorro	LINEAR	·	1.3 km	MPC · JPL
205277	2000 SC_{104}	—	September 24, 2000	Socorro	LINEAR	NYS	1.6 km	MPC · JPL
205278	2000 SL_{105}	—	September 24, 2000	Socorro	LINEAR	·	1.9 km	MPC · JPL
205279	2000 SP_{113}	—	September 24, 2000	Socorro	LINEAR	·	1.8 km	MPC · JPL
205280	2000 SU_{118}	—	September 24, 2000	Socorro	LINEAR	·	2.2 km	MPC · JPL
205281	2000 SH_{138}	—	September 23, 2000	Socorro	LINEAR	·	2.4 km	MPC · JPL
205282	2000 SU_{140}	—	September 23, 2000	Socorro	LINEAR	V	1.2 km	MPC · JPL
205283	2000 ST_{148}	—	September 24, 2000	Socorro	LINEAR	NYS	1.4 km	MPC · JPL
205284	2000 SQ_{154}	—	September 24, 2000	Socorro	LINEAR	·	1.5 km	MPC · JPL
205285	2000 SD_{156}	—	September 24, 2000	Socorro	LINEAR	NYS	1.4 km	MPC · JPL
205286	2000 SL_{167}	—	September 23, 2000	Socorro	LINEAR	·	1.9 km	MPC · JPL
205287	2000 SY_{173}	—	September 28, 2000	Socorro	LINEAR	CYB	6.3 km	MPC · JPL
205288	2000 SX_{203}	—	September 24, 2000	Socorro	LINEAR	·	1.5 km	MPC · JPL
205289	2000 SZ_{208}	—	September 25, 2000	Socorro	LINEAR	·	3.3 km	MPC · JPL
205290	2000 SH_{210}	—	September 25, 2000	Socorro	LINEAR	·	1.5 km	MPC · JPL
205291	2000 SV_{210}	—	September 25, 2000	Socorro	LINEAR	·	1.9 km	MPC · JPL
205292	2000 SQ_{229}	—	September 28, 2000	Socorro	LINEAR	·	2.0 km	MPC · JPL
205293	2000 SH_{249}	—	September 24, 2000	Socorro	LINEAR	·	1.2 km	MPC · JPL
205294	2000 ST_{253}	—	September 24, 2000	Socorro	LINEAR	·	1.2 km	MPC · JPL
205295	2000 SF_{259}	—	September 24, 2000	Socorro	LINEAR	V	1.0 km	MPC · JPL
205296	2000 SY_{260}	—	September 24, 2000	Socorro	LINEAR	·	2.4 km	MPC · JPL
205297	2000 SL_{263}	—	September 26, 2000	Socorro	LINEAR	·	1.8 km	MPC · JPL
205298	2000 SS_{265}	—	September 26, 2000	Socorro	LINEAR	·	1.8 km	MPC · JPL
205299	2000 SN_{266}	—	September 26, 2000	Socorro	LINEAR	MAS	970 m	MPC · JPL
205300	2000 SW_{267}	—	September 27, 2000	Socorro	LINEAR	·	1.7 km	MPC · JPL

== 205301–205400 ==
back to top

Designation			Discovery			Properties		Ref
Permanent	Provisional	Named after	Date	Site	Discoverer(s)	Category	Diam.	Ref
205301	2000 SG_{271}	—	September 27, 2000	Socorro	LINEAR	V	1.1 km	MPC · JPL
205302	2000 SM_{271}	—	September 27, 2000	Socorro	LINEAR	·	2.2 km	MPC · JPL
205303	2000 ST_{291}	—	September 27, 2000	Socorro	LINEAR	·	2.1 km	MPC · JPL
205304	2000 SF_{293}	—	September 27, 2000	Socorro	LINEAR	·	2.4 km	MPC · JPL
205305	2000 SS_{303}	—	September 28, 2000	Socorro	LINEAR	·	2.0 km	MPC · JPL
205306	2000 SH_{304}	—	September 30, 2000	Socorro	LINEAR	·	1.9 km	MPC · JPL
205307	2000 SD_{345}	—	September 21, 2000	Haleakala	NEAT	·	2.0 km	MPC · JPL
205308	2000 SW_{368}	—	September 22, 2000	Anderson Mesa	LONEOS	NYS	2.0 km	MPC · JPL
205309	2000 SQ_{376}	—	September 24, 2000	Socorro	LINEAR	·	1.0 km	MPC · JPL
205310	2000 TH_{11}	—	October 1, 2000	Socorro	LINEAR	MAS	1.0 km	MPC · JPL
205311	2000 TS_{12}	—	October 1, 2000	Socorro	LINEAR	PHO	3.0 km	MPC · JPL
205312	2000 TS_{16}	—	October 1, 2000	Socorro	LINEAR	NYS	1.4 km	MPC · JPL
205313	2000 TM_{18}	—	October 1, 2000	Socorro	LINEAR	·	1.6 km	MPC · JPL
205314	2000 TN_{19}	—	October 1, 2000	Socorro	LINEAR	·	1.4 km	MPC · JPL
205315	2000 TG_{41}	—	October 1, 2000	Anderson Mesa	LONEOS	·	6.2 km	MPC · JPL
205316	2000 TW_{48}	—	October 1, 2000	Anderson Mesa	LONEOS	·	1.4 km	MPC · JPL
205317	2000 TJ_{61}	—	October 2, 2000	Anderson Mesa	LONEOS	·	1.7 km	MPC · JPL
205318	2000 UA_{22}	—	October 24, 2000	Socorro	LINEAR	NYS	2.1 km	MPC · JPL
205319	2000 UY_{24}	—	October 24, 2000	Socorro	LINEAR	·	1.4 km	MPC · JPL
205320	2000 UK_{25}	—	October 24, 2000	Socorro	LINEAR	·	1.9 km	MPC · JPL
205321	2000 UF_{28}	—	October 25, 2000	Socorro	LINEAR	MAS	1.1 km	MPC · JPL
205322	2000 UW_{29}	—	October 25, 2000	Socorro	LINEAR	PHO	2.2 km	MPC · JPL
205323	2000 UJ_{34}	—	October 24, 2000	Socorro	LINEAR	·	1.6 km	MPC · JPL
205324	2000 UT_{38}	—	October 24, 2000	Socorro	LINEAR	MAS	1.2 km	MPC · JPL
205325	2000 UY_{38}	—	October 24, 2000	Socorro	LINEAR	·	2.2 km	MPC · JPL
205326	2000 UG_{41}	—	October 24, 2000	Socorro	LINEAR	·	3.8 km	MPC · JPL
205327	2000 UY_{48}	—	October 24, 2000	Socorro	LINEAR	·	2.0 km	MPC · JPL
205328	2000 UF_{65}	—	October 25, 2000	Socorro	LINEAR	·	1.8 km	MPC · JPL
205329	2000 UM_{66}	—	October 25, 2000	Socorro	LINEAR	·	1.8 km	MPC · JPL
205330	2000 UA_{84}	—	October 31, 2000	Socorro	LINEAR	·	1.5 km	MPC · JPL
205331	2000 UG_{90}	—	October 24, 2000	Socorro	LINEAR	·	1.9 km	MPC · JPL
205332	2000 UC_{92}	—	October 25, 2000	Socorro	LINEAR	·	1.9 km	MPC · JPL
205333	2000 UK_{93}	—	October 25, 2000	Socorro	LINEAR	·	2.2 km	MPC · JPL
205334	2000 UF_{94}	—	October 25, 2000	Socorro	LINEAR	·	2.4 km	MPC · JPL
205335	2000 UB_{98}	—	October 25, 2000	Socorro	LINEAR	·	1.8 km	MPC · JPL
205336	2000 UJ_{101}	—	October 25, 2000	Socorro	LINEAR	·	2.3 km	MPC · JPL
205337	2000 VN_{7}	—	November 1, 2000	Socorro	LINEAR	·	2.2 km	MPC · JPL
205338	2000 VH_{12}	—	November 1, 2000	Socorro	LINEAR	MAS	1.2 km	MPC · JPL
205339	2000 VQ_{53}	—	November 3, 2000	Socorro	LINEAR	·	1.9 km	MPC · JPL
205340	2000 VK_{55}	—	November 3, 2000	Socorro	LINEAR	·	3.1 km	MPC · JPL
205341	2000 VN_{57}	—	November 3, 2000	Socorro	LINEAR	·	2.2 km	MPC · JPL
205342	2000 WW_{5}	—	November 19, 2000	Socorro	LINEAR	·	2.1 km	MPC · JPL
205343	2000 WP_{7}	—	November 20, 2000	Socorro	LINEAR	V	1.1 km	MPC · JPL
205344	2000 WF_{18}	—	November 21, 2000	Socorro	LINEAR	MAS	1.1 km	MPC · JPL
205345	2000 WC_{26}	—	November 21, 2000	Socorro	LINEAR	NYS	1.8 km	MPC · JPL
205346	2000 WC_{29}	—	November 20, 2000	Socorro	LINEAR	·	2.5 km	MPC · JPL
205347	2000 WM_{30}	—	November 20, 2000	Socorro	LINEAR	·	3.2 km	MPC · JPL
205348	2000 WR_{52}	—	November 27, 2000	Kitt Peak	Spacewatch	MAS	1.2 km	MPC · JPL
205349	2000 WN_{66}	—	November 20, 2000	Socorro	LINEAR	·	2.5 km	MPC · JPL
205350	2000 WC_{85}	—	November 20, 2000	Socorro	LINEAR	NYS	1.8 km	MPC · JPL
205351	2000 WP_{103}	—	November 27, 2000	Socorro	LINEAR	V	1.1 km	MPC · JPL
205352	2000 WC_{107}	—	November 29, 2000	Socorro	LINEAR	H	940 m	MPC · JPL
205353	2000 WY_{126}	—	November 16, 2000	Kitt Peak	Spacewatch	·	2.4 km	MPC · JPL
205354	2000 WT_{135}	—	November 20, 2000	Anderson Mesa	LONEOS	·	2.5 km	MPC · JPL
205355	2000 WZ_{153}	—	November 30, 2000	Socorro	LINEAR	·	2.4 km	MPC · JPL
205356	2000 WZ_{172}	—	November 25, 2000	Kitt Peak	Spacewatch	·	1.8 km	MPC · JPL
205357	2000 XB_{7}	—	December 1, 2000	Socorro	LINEAR	·	4.9 km	MPC · JPL
205358	2000 XT_{26}	—	December 4, 2000	Socorro	LINEAR	·	2.2 km	MPC · JPL
205359	2000 XS_{31}	—	December 4, 2000	Socorro	LINEAR	·	1.7 km	MPC · JPL
205360	2000 XT_{38}	—	December 6, 2000	Bisei SG Center	BATTeRS	·	4.7 km	MPC · JPL
205361	2000 XQ_{50}	—	December 5, 2000	Socorro	LINEAR	·	2.8 km	MPC · JPL
205362	2000 XF_{54}	—	December 15, 2000	Uccle	T. Pauwels	·	1.2 km	MPC · JPL
205363	2000 YW_{16}	—	December 21, 2000	Socorro	LINEAR	H	810 m	MPC · JPL
205364	2000 YE_{28}	—	December 26, 2000	Haleakala	NEAT	H	840 m	MPC · JPL
205365	2000 YE_{37}	—	December 30, 2000	Socorro	LINEAR	H	690 m	MPC · JPL
205366	2000 YO_{44}	—	December 30, 2000	Socorro	LINEAR	(5)	2.6 km	MPC · JPL
205367	2000 YH_{54}	—	December 30, 2000	Socorro	LINEAR	(5)	1.9 km	MPC · JPL
205368	2000 YS_{83}	—	December 30, 2000	Socorro	LINEAR	·	2.3 km	MPC · JPL
205369	2000 YO_{106}	—	December 30, 2000	Socorro	LINEAR	H	790 m	MPC · JPL
205370	2000 YM_{124}	—	December 29, 2000	Anderson Mesa	LONEOS	·	2.5 km	MPC · JPL
205371	2001 AX	—	January 1, 2001	Kitt Peak	Spacewatch	NYS	1.8 km	MPC · JPL
205372	2001 AL_{10}	—	January 2, 2001	Socorro	LINEAR	MAS	980 m	MPC · JPL
205373	2001 AH_{21}	—	January 3, 2001	Socorro	LINEAR	·	3.0 km	MPC · JPL
205374	2001 AJ_{28}	—	January 5, 2001	Socorro	LINEAR	H · slow	1.0 km	MPC · JPL
205375	2001 AQ_{48}	—	January 4, 2001	Socorro	LINEAR	H	660 m	MPC · JPL
205376	2001 BU_{5}	—	January 18, 2001	Socorro	LINEAR	·	2.7 km	MPC · JPL
205377	2001 BR_{9}	—	January 19, 2001	Socorro	LINEAR	·	1.5 km	MPC · JPL
205378	2001 BJ_{16}	—	January 18, 2001	Haleakala	NEAT	AMO	610 m	MPC · JPL
205379	2001 BX_{23}	—	January 20, 2001	Socorro	LINEAR	·	1.6 km	MPC · JPL
205380	2001 BT_{31}	—	January 20, 2001	Socorro	LINEAR	L4	14 km	MPC · JPL
205381	2001 BM_{38}	—	January 21, 2001	Socorro	LINEAR	H	760 m	MPC · JPL
205382	2001 BJ_{44}	—	January 19, 2001	Socorro	LINEAR	·	2.2 km	MPC · JPL
205383	2001 BV_{47}	—	January 21, 2001	Socorro	LINEAR	H	900 m	MPC · JPL
205384	2001 BP_{69}	—	January 31, 2001	Socorro	LINEAR	·	2.2 km	MPC · JPL
205385	2001 CW_{36}	—	February 13, 2001	Kitt Peak	Spacewatch	·	1.6 km	MPC · JPL
205386	2001 CX_{44}	—	February 15, 2001	Socorro	LINEAR	ADE	3.9 km	MPC · JPL
205387	2001 DJ_{3}	—	February 16, 2001	Socorro	LINEAR	H	940 m	MPC · JPL
205388	2001 DV_{8}	—	February 17, 2001	Socorro	LINEAR	AMO	230 m	MPC · JPL
205389	2001 DU_{10}	—	February 17, 2001	Socorro	LINEAR	(5)	1.8 km	MPC · JPL
205390	2001 DS_{13}	—	February 19, 2001	Oizumi	T. Kobayashi	·	3.1 km	MPC · JPL
205391	2001 DA_{20}	—	February 16, 2001	Socorro	LINEAR	EUN	1.5 km	MPC · JPL
205392	2001 DX_{35}	—	February 19, 2001	Socorro	LINEAR	EUN	1.8 km	MPC · JPL
205393	2001 DQ_{50}	—	February 16, 2001	Socorro	LINEAR	·	2.1 km	MPC · JPL
205394	2001 DY_{54}	—	February 16, 2001	Kitt Peak	Spacewatch	·	1.4 km	MPC · JPL
205395	2001 DV_{77}	—	February 22, 2001	Kitt Peak	Spacewatch	·	1.3 km	MPC · JPL
205396	2001 DP_{92}	—	February 19, 2001	Anderson Mesa	LONEOS	H	820 m	MPC · JPL
205397	2001 DA_{99}	—	February 17, 2001	Socorro	LINEAR	·	1.5 km	MPC · JPL
205398	2001 EO_{3}	—	March 2, 2001	Anderson Mesa	LONEOS	MAS	960 m	MPC · JPL
205399	2001 EX_{3}	—	March 2, 2001	Anderson Mesa	LONEOS	·	2.0 km	MPC · JPL
205400	2001 EO_{10}	—	March 2, 2001	Anderson Mesa	LONEOS	·	1.7 km	MPC · JPL

== 205401–205500 ==
back to top

Designation			Discovery			Properties		Ref
Permanent	Provisional	Named after	Date	Site	Discoverer(s)	Category	Diam.	Ref
205401	2001 ED_{11}	—	March 2, 2001	Haleakala	NEAT	·	2.3 km	MPC · JPL
205402	2001 EY_{16}	—	March 3, 2001	Socorro	LINEAR	H	780 m	MPC · JPL
205403	2001 EO_{21}	—	March 15, 2001	Anderson Mesa	LONEOS	·	3.6 km	MPC · JPL
205404	2001 FO_{7}	—	March 19, 2001	Kitt Peak	Spacewatch	AGN	1.6 km	MPC · JPL
205405	2001 FL_{9}	—	March 18, 2001	Kitt Peak	Spacewatch	ADE	2.3 km	MPC · JPL
205406	2001 FG_{14}	—	March 19, 2001	Anderson Mesa	LONEOS	·	1.5 km	MPC · JPL
205407	2001 FJ_{14}	—	March 19, 2001	Anderson Mesa	LONEOS	·	2.3 km	MPC · JPL
205408	2001 FV_{20}	—	March 19, 2001	Anderson Mesa	LONEOS	·	4.1 km	MPC · JPL
205409	2001 FB_{44}	—	March 18, 2001	Socorro	LINEAR	·	1.9 km	MPC · JPL
205410	2001 FU_{56}	—	March 21, 2001	Anderson Mesa	LONEOS	·	2.2 km	MPC · JPL
205411	2001 FP_{68}	—	March 19, 2001	Socorro	LINEAR	·	1.7 km	MPC · JPL
205412	2001 FP_{85}	—	March 26, 2001	Kitt Peak	Spacewatch	·	2.4 km	MPC · JPL
205413	2001 FX_{85}	—	March 26, 2001	Cerro Tololo	Deep Lens Survey	·	2.2 km	MPC · JPL
205414	2001 FF_{93}	—	March 16, 2001	Socorro	LINEAR	·	2.2 km	MPC · JPL
205415	2001 FP_{95}	—	March 16, 2001	Socorro	LINEAR	·	3.1 km	MPC · JPL
205416	2001 FB_{117}	—	March 19, 2001	Haleakala	NEAT	·	1.9 km	MPC · JPL
205417	2001 FC_{129}	—	March 30, 2001	Kitt Peak	Spacewatch	·	1.6 km	MPC · JPL
205418	2001 FT_{135}	—	March 21, 2001	Haleakala	NEAT	·	2.3 km	MPC · JPL
205419	2001 FS_{154}	—	March 26, 2001	Socorro	LINEAR	EUN	1.6 km	MPC · JPL
205420	2001 FN_{176}	—	March 16, 2001	Socorro	LINEAR	·	1.8 km	MPC · JPL
205421	2001 FX_{176}	—	March 16, 2001	Socorro	LINEAR	ADE	2.5 km	MPC · JPL
205422	2001 FP_{190}	—	March 19, 2001	Kitt Peak	Spacewatch	·	1.1 km	MPC · JPL
205423	2001 FM_{196}	—	March 25, 2001	Anderson Mesa	LONEOS	·	2.0 km	MPC · JPL
205424 Bibracte	2001 GY_{3}	Bibracte	April 13, 2001	Le Creusot	J.-C. Merlin	·	2.7 km	MPC · JPL
205425	2001 GD_{9}	—	April 15, 2001	Socorro	LINEAR	·	2.6 km	MPC · JPL
205426	2001 HT_{16}	—	April 25, 2001	Desert Beaver	W. K. Y. Yeung	JUN	1.9 km	MPC · JPL
205427	2001 HM_{17}	—	April 24, 2001	Kitt Peak	Spacewatch	·	1.5 km	MPC · JPL
205428	2001 HD_{66}	—	April 24, 2001	Anderson Mesa	LONEOS	·	2.3 km	MPC · JPL
205429	2001 HR_{66}	—	April 25, 2001	Anderson Mesa	LONEOS	·	3.1 km	MPC · JPL
205430	2001 JC_{3}	—	May 15, 2001	Anderson Mesa	LONEOS	·	2.5 km	MPC · JPL
205431	2001 JD_{8}	—	May 15, 2001	Anderson Mesa	LONEOS	·	3.5 km	MPC · JPL
205432	2001 JN_{8}	—	May 15, 2001	Anderson Mesa	LONEOS	·	2.3 km	MPC · JPL
205433	2001 KE	—	May 16, 2001	Socorro	LINEAR	H	1.0 km	MPC · JPL
205434	2001 KV_{27}	—	May 17, 2001	Socorro	LINEAR	·	2.6 km	MPC · JPL
205435	2001 KU_{34}	—	May 18, 2001	Socorro	LINEAR	·	1.7 km	MPC · JPL
205436	2001 KV_{55}	—	May 22, 2001	Socorro	LINEAR	·	4.3 km	MPC · JPL
205437	2001 MU_{11}	—	June 21, 2001	Palomar	NEAT	·	2.9 km	MPC · JPL
205438	2001 ML_{12}	—	June 21, 2001	Palomar	NEAT	·	3.3 km	MPC · JPL
205439	2001 MQ_{29}	—	June 27, 2001	Anderson Mesa	LONEOS	·	5.1 km	MPC · JPL
205440	2001 NW_{20}	—	July 14, 2001	Palomar	NEAT	·	1.2 km	MPC · JPL
205441	2001 NF_{21}	—	July 14, 2001	Palomar	NEAT	·	6.0 km	MPC · JPL
205442	2001 OY_{3}	—	July 18, 2001	Palomar	NEAT	·	3.4 km	MPC · JPL
205443	2001 OP_{7}	—	July 17, 2001	Anderson Mesa	LONEOS	·	5.3 km	MPC · JPL
205444	2001 OK_{29}	—	July 18, 2001	Palomar	NEAT	DOR	4.5 km	MPC · JPL
205445	2001 OJ_{44}	—	July 23, 2001	Palomar	NEAT	·	8.0 km	MPC · JPL
205446	2001 OE_{69}	—	July 18, 2001	Palomar	NEAT	·	990 m	MPC · JPL
205447	2001 PW_{6}	—	August 10, 2001	Haleakala	NEAT	·	1.1 km	MPC · JPL
205448	2001 PW_{19}	—	August 10, 2001	Palomar	NEAT	EOS	3.1 km	MPC · JPL
205449	2001 PU_{31}	—	August 10, 2001	Palomar	NEAT	EOS	2.7 km	MPC · JPL
205450	2001 PQ_{32}	—	August 10, 2001	Palomar	NEAT	EOS	2.6 km	MPC · JPL
205451	2001 PC_{39}	—	August 11, 2001	Palomar	NEAT	·	5.1 km	MPC · JPL
205452	2001 PH_{50}	—	August 15, 2001	Haleakala	NEAT	·	6.8 km	MPC · JPL
205453	2001 PU_{55}	—	August 14, 2001	Haleakala	NEAT	EOS	2.8 km	MPC · JPL
205454	2001 PX_{66}	—	August 12, 2001	Palomar	NEAT	·	5.6 km	MPC · JPL
205455	2001 QR_{1}	—	August 16, 2001	Socorro	LINEAR	HYG	3.6 km	MPC · JPL
205456	2001 QV_{10}	—	August 16, 2001	Socorro	LINEAR	THM	3.6 km	MPC · JPL
205457	2001 QY_{12}	—	August 16, 2001	Socorro	LINEAR	·	1.2 km	MPC · JPL
205458	2001 QA_{13}	—	August 16, 2001	Socorro	LINEAR	·	1.2 km	MPC · JPL
205459	2001 QQ_{34}	—	August 16, 2001	Socorro	LINEAR	·	4.2 km	MPC · JPL
205460	2001 QA_{37}	—	August 16, 2001	Socorro	LINEAR	·	5.1 km	MPC · JPL
205461	2001 QX_{40}	—	August 16, 2001	Socorro	LINEAR	·	3.7 km	MPC · JPL
205462	2001 QB_{46}	—	August 16, 2001	Socorro	LINEAR	·	1.0 km	MPC · JPL
205463	2001 QP_{65}	—	August 17, 2001	Socorro	LINEAR	·	5.2 km	MPC · JPL
205464	2001 QH_{73}	—	August 19, 2001	Socorro	LINEAR	T_{j} (2.98)	4.8 km	MPC · JPL
205465	2001 QK_{86}	—	August 16, 2001	Palomar	NEAT	·	6.7 km	MPC · JPL
205466	2001 QB_{100}	—	August 18, 2001	Palomar	NEAT	·	4.4 km	MPC · JPL
205467	2001 QF_{112}	—	August 25, 2001	Socorro	LINEAR	·	3.5 km	MPC · JPL
205468	2001 QJ_{112}	—	August 25, 2001	Socorro	LINEAR	EOS	3.9 km	MPC · JPL
205469	2001 QY_{113}	—	August 26, 2001	Ondřejov	P. Pravec, P. Kušnirák	EOS	2.6 km	MPC · JPL
205470	2001 QV_{117}	—	August 17, 2001	Socorro	LINEAR	·	1.2 km	MPC · JPL
205471	2001 QY_{123}	—	August 19, 2001	Socorro	LINEAR	·	3.6 km	MPC · JPL
205472	2001 QS_{152}	—	August 26, 2001	Desert Eagle	W. K. Y. Yeung	·	4.8 km	MPC · JPL
205473	2001 QE_{155}	—	August 23, 2001	Anderson Mesa	LONEOS	·	7.0 km	MPC · JPL
205474	2001 QE_{158}	—	August 23, 2001	Anderson Mesa	LONEOS	·	3.9 km	MPC · JPL
205475	2001 QM_{162}	—	August 23, 2001	Anderson Mesa	LONEOS	EOS	3.3 km	MPC · JPL
205476	2001 QT_{186}	—	August 21, 2001	Kitt Peak	Spacewatch	·	1.3 km	MPC · JPL
205477	2001 QM_{187}	—	August 21, 2001	Haleakala	NEAT	·	780 m	MPC · JPL
205478	2001 QP_{190}	—	August 22, 2001	Socorro	LINEAR	·	8.6 km	MPC · JPL
205479	2001 QB_{203}	—	August 23, 2001	Anderson Mesa	LONEOS	TEL	2.2 km	MPC · JPL
205480	2001 QQ_{205}	—	August 23, 2001	Anderson Mesa	LONEOS	·	3.8 km	MPC · JPL
205481	2001 QZ_{208}	—	August 23, 2001	Anderson Mesa	LONEOS	·	3.6 km	MPC · JPL
205482	2001 QJ_{214}	—	August 23, 2001	Anderson Mesa	LONEOS	·	950 m	MPC · JPL
205483	2001 QU_{223}	—	August 24, 2001	Anderson Mesa	LONEOS	·	2.9 km	MPC · JPL
205484	2001 QY_{236}	—	August 24, 2001	Socorro	LINEAR	EOS	3.0 km	MPC · JPL
205485	2001 QP_{238}	—	August 24, 2001	Socorro	LINEAR	EOS	3.1 km	MPC · JPL
205486	2001 QG_{240}	—	August 24, 2001	Socorro	LINEAR	EOS	3.0 km	MPC · JPL
205487	2001 QP_{242}	—	August 24, 2001	Socorro	LINEAR	CYB	5.5 km	MPC · JPL
205488	2001 QL_{248}	—	August 24, 2001	Socorro	LINEAR	·	940 m	MPC · JPL
205489	2001 QT_{248}	—	August 24, 2001	Socorro	LINEAR	·	1.2 km	MPC · JPL
205490	2001 QR_{255}	—	August 25, 2001	Socorro	LINEAR	·	5.9 km	MPC · JPL
205491	2001 QG_{266}	—	August 20, 2001	Socorro	LINEAR	·	1.3 km	MPC · JPL
205492	2001 QM_{267}	—	August 20, 2001	Palomar	NEAT	·	6.1 km	MPC · JPL
205493	2001 QP_{268}	—	August 20, 2001	Palomar	NEAT	·	8.3 km	MPC · JPL
205494	2001 QH_{294}	—	August 24, 2001	Anderson Mesa	LONEOS	·	2.0 km	MPC · JPL
205495	2001 QF_{295}	—	August 24, 2001	Socorro	LINEAR	·	1.7 km	MPC · JPL
205496	2001 QN_{327}	—	August 16, 2001	Palomar	NEAT	T_{j} (2.99) · EUP	4.9 km	MPC · JPL
205497	2001 QQ_{327}	—	August 16, 2001	Palomar	NEAT	·	5.4 km	MPC · JPL
205498	2001 RX_{8}	—	September 10, 2001	Haleakala	NEAT	·	1.3 km	MPC · JPL
205499	2001 RD_{17}	—	September 11, 2001	Desert Eagle	W. K. Y. Yeung	EUP	7.0 km	MPC · JPL
205500	2001 RE_{21}	—	September 7, 2001	Socorro	LINEAR	EOS	2.7 km	MPC · JPL

== 205501–205600 ==
back to top

Designation			Discovery			Properties		Ref
Permanent	Provisional	Named after	Date	Site	Discoverer(s)	Category	Diam.	Ref
205501	2001 RJ_{24}	—	September 7, 2001	Socorro	LINEAR	·	4.4 km	MPC · JPL
205502	2001 RX_{26}	—	September 7, 2001	Socorro	LINEAR	·	870 m	MPC · JPL
205503	2001 RU_{37}	—	September 8, 2001	Socorro	LINEAR	·	3.1 km	MPC · JPL
205504	2001 RS_{41}	—	September 11, 2001	Socorro	LINEAR	KOR	2.0 km	MPC · JPL
205505	2001 RV_{59}	—	September 12, 2001	Socorro	LINEAR	·	3.2 km	MPC · JPL
205506	2001 RE_{62}	—	September 12, 2001	Socorro	LINEAR	·	4.3 km	MPC · JPL
205507	2001 RL_{90}	—	September 11, 2001	Anderson Mesa	LONEOS	·	3.5 km	MPC · JPL
205508	2001 RV_{111}	—	September 12, 2001	Socorro	LINEAR	·	2.3 km	MPC · JPL
205509	2001 RB_{116}	—	September 12, 2001	Socorro	LINEAR	HYG	4.9 km	MPC · JPL
205510	2001 RQ_{138}	—	September 12, 2001	Socorro	LINEAR	THM	4.7 km	MPC · JPL
205511	2001 RW_{140}	—	September 12, 2001	Socorro	LINEAR	·	2.6 km	MPC · JPL
205512	2001 RN_{149}	—	September 11, 2001	Anderson Mesa	LONEOS	KOR	2.1 km	MPC · JPL
205513	2001 SG_{3}	—	September 17, 2001	Desert Eagle	W. K. Y. Yeung	·	1.2 km	MPC · JPL
205514	2001 SP_{9}	—	September 18, 2001	Desert Eagle	W. K. Y. Yeung	EUP	7.5 km	MPC · JPL
205515	2001 SP_{12}	—	September 16, 2001	Socorro	LINEAR	·	3.4 km	MPC · JPL
205516	2001 SL_{23}	—	September 16, 2001	Socorro	LINEAR	THM	3.1 km	MPC · JPL
205517	2001 SR_{29}	—	September 16, 2001	Socorro	LINEAR	·	6.1 km	MPC · JPL
205518	2001 SO_{48}	—	September 16, 2001	Socorro	LINEAR	·	1.6 km	MPC · JPL
205519	2001 SF_{63}	—	September 17, 2001	Socorro	LINEAR	EOS ·	7.8 km	MPC · JPL
205520	2001 SZ_{64}	—	September 17, 2001	Socorro	LINEAR	·	1.4 km	MPC · JPL
205521	2001 SE_{90}	—	September 20, 2001	Socorro	LINEAR	KOR	1.6 km	MPC · JPL
205522	2001 SF_{94}	—	September 20, 2001	Socorro	LINEAR	·	2.2 km	MPC · JPL
205523	2001 SU_{94}	—	September 20, 2001	Socorro	LINEAR	·	3.7 km	MPC · JPL
205524	2001 SJ_{101}	—	September 20, 2001	Socorro	LINEAR	THM	2.7 km	MPC · JPL
205525	2001 SA_{114}	—	September 20, 2001	Desert Eagle	W. K. Y. Yeung	·	890 m	MPC · JPL
205526	2001 SE_{114}	—	September 20, 2001	Desert Eagle	W. K. Y. Yeung	·	5.3 km	MPC · JPL
205527	2001 SD_{117}	—	September 16, 2001	Socorro	LINEAR	·	4.4 km	MPC · JPL
205528	2001 SU_{118}	—	September 16, 2001	Socorro	LINEAR	·	830 m	MPC · JPL
205529	2001 SJ_{119}	—	September 16, 2001	Socorro	LINEAR	EOS	3.1 km	MPC · JPL
205530	2001 SH_{125}	—	September 16, 2001	Socorro	LINEAR	EOS	2.8 km	MPC · JPL
205531	2001 SO_{126}	—	September 16, 2001	Socorro	LINEAR	·	4.7 km	MPC · JPL
205532	2001 SV_{126}	—	September 16, 2001	Socorro	LINEAR	·	3.0 km	MPC · JPL
205533	2001 SL_{134}	—	September 16, 2001	Socorro	LINEAR	·	3.8 km	MPC · JPL
205534	2001 SJ_{151}	—	September 17, 2001	Socorro	LINEAR	·	820 m	MPC · JPL
205535	2001 SW_{166}	—	September 19, 2001	Socorro	LINEAR	EOS	3.0 km	MPC · JPL
205536	2001 SY_{166}	—	September 19, 2001	Socorro	LINEAR	·	4.0 km	MPC · JPL
205537	2001 SB_{168}	—	September 19, 2001	Socorro	LINEAR	V	990 m	MPC · JPL
205538	2001 SO_{169}	—	September 22, 2001	Eskridge	G. Hug	·	3.9 km	MPC · JPL
205539	2001 ST_{172}	—	September 16, 2001	Socorro	LINEAR	NAE	3.7 km	MPC · JPL
205540	2001 SU_{172}	—	September 16, 2001	Socorro	LINEAR	·	3.6 km	MPC · JPL
205541	2001 SD_{173}	—	September 16, 2001	Socorro	LINEAR	·	780 m	MPC · JPL
205542	2001 SM_{173}	—	September 16, 2001	Socorro	LINEAR	·	3.5 km	MPC · JPL
205543	2001 SD_{175}	—	September 16, 2001	Socorro	LINEAR	·	3.3 km	MPC · JPL
205544	2001 SY_{196}	—	September 19, 2001	Socorro	LINEAR	THM	3.1 km	MPC · JPL
205545	2001 SX_{197}	—	September 19, 2001	Socorro	LINEAR	615	2.1 km	MPC · JPL
205546	2001 SC_{200}	—	September 19, 2001	Socorro	LINEAR	·	2.6 km	MPC · JPL
205547	2001 SJ_{200}	—	September 19, 2001	Socorro	LINEAR	·	2.5 km	MPC · JPL
205548	2001 SE_{202}	—	September 19, 2001	Socorro	LINEAR	KOR	2.5 km	MPC · JPL
205549	2001 SN_{205}	—	September 19, 2001	Socorro	LINEAR	·	4.2 km	MPC · JPL
205550	2001 SD_{214}	—	September 19, 2001	Socorro	LINEAR	·	1.2 km	MPC · JPL
205551	2001 SB_{218}	—	September 19, 2001	Socorro	LINEAR	·	3.0 km	MPC · JPL
205552	2001 SR_{221}	—	September 19, 2001	Socorro	LINEAR	THM	3.1 km	MPC · JPL
205553	2001 SN_{229}	—	September 19, 2001	Socorro	LINEAR	·	5.1 km	MPC · JPL
205554	2001 SH_{243}	—	September 19, 2001	Socorro	LINEAR	·	4.1 km	MPC · JPL
205555	2001 SV_{250}	—	September 19, 2001	Socorro	LINEAR	·	1.2 km	MPC · JPL
205556	2001 SH_{256}	—	September 19, 2001	Socorro	LINEAR	·	910 m	MPC · JPL
205557	2001 SU_{272}	—	September 25, 2001	Bohyunsan	Jeon, Y.-B., Lee, B.-C.	HYG	4.0 km	MPC · JPL
205558	2001 SF_{273}	—	September 27, 2001	Emerald Lane	L. Ball	·	3.0 km	MPC · JPL
205559	2001 SK_{274}	—	September 20, 2001	Kitt Peak	Spacewatch	·	3.7 km	MPC · JPL
205560	2001 SC_{282}	—	September 22, 2001	Anderson Mesa	LONEOS	·	1.8 km	MPC · JPL
205561	2001 SW_{288}	—	September 28, 2001	Palomar	NEAT	·	4.8 km	MPC · JPL
205562	2001 SH_{291}	—	September 21, 2001	Anderson Mesa	LONEOS	TIR	4.4 km	MPC · JPL
205563	2001 SS_{295}	—	September 20, 2001	Socorro	LINEAR	KOR	2.3 km	MPC · JPL
205564	2001 SS_{299}	—	September 20, 2001	Socorro	LINEAR	·	3.6 km	MPC · JPL
205565	2001 SR_{303}	—	September 20, 2001	Socorro	LINEAR	EOS	4.6 km	MPC · JPL
205566	2001 SE_{307}	—	September 21, 2001	Socorro	LINEAR	·	520 m	MPC · JPL
205567	2001 SP_{309}	—	September 23, 2001	Socorro	LINEAR	·	2.2 km	MPC · JPL
205568	2001 SL_{322}	—	September 25, 2001	Socorro	LINEAR	EOS	5.4 km	MPC · JPL
205569	2001 SY_{323}	—	September 25, 2001	Socorro	LINEAR	·	930 m	MPC · JPL
205570	2001 SU_{324}	—	September 16, 2001	Socorro	LINEAR	·	730 m	MPC · JPL
205571	2001 SS_{336}	—	September 20, 2001	Socorro	LINEAR	·	2.2 km	MPC · JPL
205572	2001 SC_{338}	—	September 20, 2001	Socorro	LINEAR	·	930 m	MPC · JPL
205573	2001 TM_{5}	—	October 10, 2001	Palomar	NEAT	·	3.6 km	MPC · JPL
205574	2001 TF_{12}	—	October 13, 2001	Socorro	LINEAR	·	4.1 km	MPC · JPL
205575	2001 TC_{36}	—	October 14, 2001	Socorro	LINEAR	·	870 m	MPC · JPL
205576	2001 TL_{46}	—	October 15, 2001	Socorro	LINEAR	·	7.7 km	MPC · JPL
205577	2001 TO_{47}	—	October 14, 2001	Cima Ekar	ADAS	·	5.6 km	MPC · JPL
205578	2001 TE_{55}	—	October 14, 2001	Socorro	LINEAR	(159)	3.7 km	MPC · JPL
205579	2001 TX_{55}	—	October 15, 2001	Socorro	LINEAR	·	3.5 km	MPC · JPL
205580	2001 TS_{72}	—	October 13, 2001	Socorro	LINEAR	HYG	5.8 km	MPC · JPL
205581	2001 TN_{84}	—	October 14, 2001	Socorro	LINEAR	·	3.8 km	MPC · JPL
205582	2001 TT_{95}	—	October 14, 2001	Socorro	LINEAR	·	800 m	MPC · JPL
205583	2001 TD_{136}	—	October 13, 2001	Palomar	NEAT	·	880 m	MPC · JPL
205584	2001 TU_{139}	—	October 10, 2001	Palomar	NEAT	EOS	2.4 km	MPC · JPL
205585	2001 TY_{144}	—	October 10, 2001	Palomar	NEAT	·	810 m	MPC · JPL
205586	2001 TQ_{145}	—	October 10, 2001	Palomar	NEAT	·	3.1 km	MPC · JPL
205587	2001 TE_{150}	—	October 10, 2001	Palomar	NEAT	·	1.0 km	MPC · JPL
205588	2001 TW_{150}	—	October 10, 2001	Palomar	NEAT	·	850 m	MPC · JPL
205589	2001 TW_{173}	—	October 14, 2001	Socorro	LINEAR	·	4.1 km	MPC · JPL
205590	2001 TU_{176}	—	October 14, 2001	Socorro	LINEAR	·	5.0 km	MPC · JPL
205591	2001 TH_{179}	—	October 14, 2001	Socorro	LINEAR	·	820 m	MPC · JPL
205592	2001 TR_{191}	—	October 14, 2001	Socorro	LINEAR	·	1.1 km	MPC · JPL
205593	2001 TR_{198}	—	October 11, 2001	Socorro	LINEAR	·	820 m	MPC · JPL
205594	2001 TT_{199}	—	October 11, 2001	Socorro	LINEAR	·	4.8 km	MPC · JPL
205595	2001 TF_{201}	—	October 11, 2001	Socorro	LINEAR	·	4.6 km	MPC · JPL
205596	2001 TK_{228}	—	October 15, 2001	Socorro	LINEAR	·	4.2 km	MPC · JPL
205597	2001 TR_{230}	—	October 15, 2001	Palomar	NEAT	LIX	6.3 km	MPC · JPL
205598	2001 TX_{232}	—	October 15, 2001	Kitt Peak	Spacewatch	·	4.8 km	MPC · JPL
205599 Walkowicz	2001 TE_{243}	Walkowicz	October 14, 2001	Apache Point	SDSS	·	990 m	MPC · JPL
205600	2001 TA_{248}	—	October 14, 2001	Apache Point	SDSS	·	730 m	MPC · JPL

== 205601–205700 ==
back to top

Designation			Discovery			Properties		Ref
Permanent	Provisional	Named after	Date	Site	Discoverer(s)	Category	Diam.	Ref
205601	2001 TY_{256}	—	October 14, 2001	Cima Ekar	ADAS	·	5.2 km	MPC · JPL
205602	2001 UT_{25}	—	October 18, 2001	Socorro	LINEAR	·	1.2 km	MPC · JPL
205603	2001 UM_{31}	—	October 16, 2001	Socorro	LINEAR	·	1.2 km	MPC · JPL
205604	2001 UD_{59}	—	October 17, 2001	Socorro	LINEAR	·	5.2 km	MPC · JPL
205605	2001 UL_{90}	—	October 21, 2001	Kitt Peak	Spacewatch	THM	3.0 km	MPC · JPL
205606	2001 UK_{103}	—	October 20, 2001	Socorro	LINEAR	·	730 m	MPC · JPL
205607	2001 UU_{104}	—	October 20, 2001	Socorro	LINEAR	VER	5.2 km	MPC · JPL
205608	2001 UK_{128}	—	October 18, 2001	Socorro	LINEAR	VER	5.7 km	MPC · JPL
205609	2001 UV_{152}	—	October 23, 2001	Socorro	LINEAR	·	930 m	MPC · JPL
205610	2001 UP_{156}	—	October 23, 2001	Socorro	LINEAR	·	1.0 km	MPC · JPL
205611	2001 UZ_{156}	—	October 23, 2001	Socorro	LINEAR	·	760 m	MPC · JPL
205612	2001 UN_{166}	—	October 23, 2001	Kitt Peak	Spacewatch	·	800 m	MPC · JPL
205613	2001 UF_{168}	—	October 19, 2001	Socorro	LINEAR	·	1.7 km	MPC · JPL
205614	2001 UU_{172}	—	October 18, 2001	Palomar	NEAT	·	3.7 km	MPC · JPL
205615	2001 UJ_{179}	—	October 26, 2001	Palomar	NEAT	·	4.8 km	MPC · JPL
205616	2001 UG_{191}	—	October 18, 2001	Palomar	NEAT	·	870 m	MPC · JPL
205617	2001 UQ_{197}	—	October 19, 2001	Palomar	NEAT	·	3.7 km	MPC · JPL
205618	2001 UB_{205}	—	October 19, 2001	Palomar	NEAT	·	750 m	MPC · JPL
205619	2001 UA_{206}	—	October 19, 2001	Palomar	NEAT	·	3.7 km	MPC · JPL
205620	2001 UQ_{217}	—	October 24, 2001	Palomar	NEAT	EOS	3.1 km	MPC · JPL
205621	2001 UP_{220}	—	October 21, 2001	Socorro	LINEAR	·	990 m	MPC · JPL
205622	2001 VO_{2}	—	November 6, 2001	Socorro	LINEAR	·	1.5 km	MPC · JPL
205623	2001 VC_{16}	—	November 8, 2001	Palomar	NEAT	·	1.1 km	MPC · JPL
205624	2001 VN_{17}	—	November 9, 2001	Bergisch Gladbach	W. Bickel	(883)	1.4 km	MPC · JPL
205625	2001 VZ_{20}	—	November 9, 2001	Socorro	LINEAR	·	4.6 km	MPC · JPL
205626	2001 VK_{35}	—	November 9, 2001	Socorro	LINEAR	·	1.1 km	MPC · JPL
205627	2001 VP_{50}	—	November 10, 2001	Socorro	LINEAR	·	1.2 km	MPC · JPL
205628	2001 VP_{66}	—	November 10, 2001	Socorro	LINEAR	·	970 m	MPC · JPL
205629	2001 VW_{69}	—	November 11, 2001	Socorro	LINEAR	·	1.2 km	MPC · JPL
205630	2001 VU_{80}	—	November 10, 2001	Palomar	NEAT	·	850 m	MPC · JPL
205631	2001 VB_{89}	—	November 12, 2001	Socorro	LINEAR	·	4.6 km	MPC · JPL
205632	2001 WK_{13}	—	November 17, 2001	Socorro	LINEAR	·	880 m	MPC · JPL
205633	2001 WS_{23}	—	November 17, 2001	Kitt Peak	Spacewatch	THM	2.9 km	MPC · JPL
205634	2001 WA_{27}	—	November 17, 2001	Socorro	LINEAR	·	1.1 km	MPC · JPL
205635	2001 WA_{53}	—	November 19, 2001	Socorro	LINEAR	·	630 m	MPC · JPL
205636	2001 WX_{69}	—	November 20, 2001	Socorro	LINEAR	·	3.4 km	MPC · JPL
205637	2001 WC_{74}	—	November 20, 2001	Socorro	LINEAR	·	3.8 km	MPC · JPL
205638	2001 WV_{88}	—	November 19, 2001	Socorro	LINEAR	·	1.1 km	MPC · JPL
205639	2001 WO_{93}	—	November 20, 2001	Socorro	LINEAR	·	4.7 km	MPC · JPL
205640	2001 XQ_{4}	—	December 9, 2001	Socorro	LINEAR	·	1.6 km	MPC · JPL
205641	2001 XY_{13}	—	December 9, 2001	Socorro	LINEAR	·	1.3 km	MPC · JPL
205642	2001 XU_{23}	—	December 9, 2001	Socorro	LINEAR	·	1.5 km	MPC · JPL
205643	2001 XP_{41}	—	December 9, 2001	Socorro	LINEAR	·	840 m	MPC · JPL
205644	2001 XN_{55}	—	December 10, 2001	Socorro	LINEAR	·	1.1 km	MPC · JPL
205645	2001 XZ_{64}	—	December 10, 2001	Socorro	LINEAR	·	1.3 km	MPC · JPL
205646	2001 XO_{90}	—	December 10, 2001	Socorro	LINEAR	·	1.1 km	MPC · JPL
205647	2001 XQ_{91}	—	December 10, 2001	Socorro	LINEAR	·	810 m	MPC · JPL
205648	2001 XD_{98}	—	December 10, 2001	Socorro	LINEAR	·	1.6 km	MPC · JPL
205649	2001 XN_{99}	—	December 10, 2001	Socorro	LINEAR	·	1.2 km	MPC · JPL
205650	2001 XS_{101}	—	December 10, 2001	Socorro	LINEAR	·	1.2 km	MPC · JPL
205651	2001 XB_{103}	—	December 14, 2001	Socorro	LINEAR	·	1.2 km	MPC · JPL
205652	2001 XR_{108}	—	December 10, 2001	Socorro	LINEAR	·	1.1 km	MPC · JPL
205653	2001 XU_{108}	—	December 10, 2001	Socorro	LINEAR	·	1.6 km	MPC · JPL
205654	2001 XT_{122}	—	December 14, 2001	Socorro	LINEAR	·	970 m	MPC · JPL
205655	2001 XT_{142}	—	December 14, 2001	Socorro	LINEAR	·	1.1 km	MPC · JPL
205656	2001 XT_{143}	—	December 14, 2001	Socorro	LINEAR	THM	5.5 km	MPC · JPL
205657	2001 XL_{146}	—	December 14, 2001	Socorro	LINEAR	·	1.0 km	MPC · JPL
205658	2001 XY_{147}	—	December 14, 2001	Socorro	LINEAR	·	990 m	MPC · JPL
205659	2001 XO_{150}	—	December 14, 2001	Socorro	LINEAR	·	890 m	MPC · JPL
205660	2001 XK_{153}	—	December 14, 2001	Socorro	LINEAR	·	1.4 km	MPC · JPL
205661	2001 XT_{158}	—	December 14, 2001	Socorro	LINEAR	·	1.8 km	MPC · JPL
205662	2001 XH_{166}	—	December 14, 2001	Socorro	LINEAR	·	1.3 km	MPC · JPL
205663	2001 XD_{169}	—	December 14, 2001	Socorro	LINEAR	·	1.1 km	MPC · JPL
205664	2001 XZ_{173}	—	December 14, 2001	Socorro	LINEAR	·	1.2 km	MPC · JPL
205665	2001 XU_{174}	—	December 14, 2001	Socorro	LINEAR	·	1.0 km	MPC · JPL
205666	2001 XS_{178}	—	December 14, 2001	Socorro	LINEAR	·	1.8 km	MPC · JPL
205667	2001 XY_{178}	—	December 14, 2001	Socorro	LINEAR	·	910 m	MPC · JPL
205668	2001 XB_{187}	—	December 14, 2001	Socorro	LINEAR	·	1.8 km	MPC · JPL
205669	2001 XQ_{191}	—	December 14, 2001	Socorro	LINEAR	·	1.2 km	MPC · JPL
205670	2001 XD_{192}	—	December 14, 2001	Socorro	LINEAR	·	1.5 km	MPC · JPL
205671	2001 XZ_{199}	—	December 14, 2001	Socorro	LINEAR	·	1.2 km	MPC · JPL
205672	2001 XD_{200}	—	December 14, 2001	Socorro	LINEAR	·	1.4 km	MPC · JPL
205673	2001 XA_{201}	—	December 15, 2001	Socorro	LINEAR	·	870 m	MPC · JPL
205674	2001 XT_{229}	—	December 15, 2001	Socorro	LINEAR	·	1.1 km	MPC · JPL
205675	2001 XB_{231}	—	December 15, 2001	Socorro	LINEAR	·	680 m	MPC · JPL
205676	2001 XR_{242}	—	December 14, 2001	Socorro	LINEAR	·	1.1 km	MPC · JPL
205677	2001 XT_{253}	—	December 14, 2001	Socorro	LINEAR	·	1.1 km	MPC · JPL
205678	2001 XZ_{253}	—	December 14, 2001	Socorro	LINEAR	·	1.8 km	MPC · JPL
205679	2001 YA_{2}	—	December 18, 2001	Socorro	LINEAR	·	980 m	MPC · JPL
205680	2001 YU_{2}	—	December 17, 2001	Socorro	LINEAR	·	2.9 km	MPC · JPL
205681	2001 YN_{3}	—	December 20, 2001	Kitt Peak	Spacewatch	·	900 m	MPC · JPL
205682	2001 YR_{19}	—	December 17, 2001	Socorro	LINEAR	·	1.2 km	MPC · JPL
205683	2001 YG_{38}	—	December 18, 2001	Socorro	LINEAR	·	1.0 km	MPC · JPL
205684	2001 YO_{66}	—	December 18, 2001	Socorro	LINEAR	·	1.2 km	MPC · JPL
205685	2001 YW_{77}	—	December 18, 2001	Socorro	LINEAR	·	1.4 km	MPC · JPL
205686	2001 YK_{91}	—	December 17, 2001	Palomar	NEAT	PHO	2.4 km	MPC · JPL
205687	2001 YY_{100}	—	December 17, 2001	Socorro	LINEAR	·	1.1 km	MPC · JPL
205688	2001 YV_{110}	—	December 18, 2001	Anderson Mesa	LONEOS	·	2.4 km	MPC · JPL
205689	2001 YM_{113}	—	December 19, 2001	Socorro	LINEAR	·	2.4 km	MPC · JPL
205690	2001 YM_{115}	—	December 17, 2001	Socorro	LINEAR	(2076)	1.6 km	MPC · JPL
205691	2001 YR_{123}	—	December 17, 2001	Socorro	LINEAR	·	1.1 km	MPC · JPL
205692	2001 YT_{125}	—	December 17, 2001	Socorro	LINEAR	·	1.4 km	MPC · JPL
205693	2001 YT_{126}	—	December 17, 2001	Socorro	LINEAR	·	1.3 km	MPC · JPL
205694	2001 YG_{127}	—	December 17, 2001	Socorro	LINEAR	·	1.7 km	MPC · JPL
205695	2001 YR_{132}	—	December 20, 2001	Socorro	LINEAR	·	1.4 km	MPC · JPL
205696	2001 YB_{139}	—	December 18, 2001	Kitt Peak	Spacewatch	NYS	1.0 km	MPC · JPL
205697	2001 YM_{151}	—	December 19, 2001	Palomar	NEAT	·	970 m	MPC · JPL
205698 Troiani	2002 AO_{3}	Troiani	January 8, 2002	Desert Moon	Stevens, B. L.	·	2.1 km	MPC · JPL
205699	2002 AJ_{6}	—	January 5, 2002	Kitt Peak	Spacewatch	·	1.1 km	MPC · JPL
205700	2002 AY_{12}	—	January 10, 2002	Campo Imperatore	CINEOS	·	1.6 km	MPC · JPL

== 205701–205800 ==
back to top

Designation			Discovery			Properties		Ref
Permanent	Provisional	Named after	Date	Site	Discoverer(s)	Category	Diam.	Ref
205701	2002 AC_{13}	—	January 11, 2002	Campo Imperatore	CINEOS	·	1.3 km	MPC · JPL
205702	2002 AQ_{16}	—	January 4, 2002	Haleakala	NEAT	·	1.9 km	MPC · JPL
205703	2002 AQ_{23}	—	January 5, 2002	Haleakala	NEAT	·	1.2 km	MPC · JPL
205704	2002 AE_{30}	—	January 9, 2002	Socorro	LINEAR	·	1.1 km	MPC · JPL
205705	2002 AH_{33}	—	January 6, 2002	Kitt Peak	Spacewatch	·	1.0 km	MPC · JPL
205706	2002 AE_{35}	—	January 8, 2002	Socorro	LINEAR	·	970 m	MPC · JPL
205707	2002 AR_{35}	—	January 8, 2002	Socorro	LINEAR	·	1.2 km	MPC · JPL
205708	2002 AA_{48}	—	January 9, 2002	Socorro	LINEAR	·	1.7 km	MPC · JPL
205709	2002 AE_{50}	—	January 9, 2002	Socorro	LINEAR	V	870 m	MPC · JPL
205710	2002 AY_{53}	—	January 9, 2002	Socorro	LINEAR	·	960 m	MPC · JPL
205711	2002 AV_{60}	—	January 11, 2002	Socorro	LINEAR	·	2.0 km	MPC · JPL
205712	2002 AB_{66}	—	January 12, 2002	Socorro	LINEAR	·	790 m	MPC · JPL
205713	2002 AP_{71}	—	January 8, 2002	Socorro	LINEAR	·	2.8 km	MPC · JPL
205714	2002 AR_{74}	—	January 8, 2002	Socorro	LINEAR	·	1.1 km	MPC · JPL
205715	2002 AE_{78}	—	January 8, 2002	Socorro	LINEAR	·	940 m	MPC · JPL
205716	2002 AQ_{78}	—	January 8, 2002	Socorro	LINEAR	(2076)	960 m	MPC · JPL
205717	2002 AW_{84}	—	January 9, 2002	Socorro	LINEAR	·	1.7 km	MPC · JPL
205718	2002 AL_{86}	—	January 9, 2002	Socorro	LINEAR	(2076)	1.1 km	MPC · JPL
205719	2002 AY_{87}	—	January 9, 2002	Socorro	LINEAR	·	1.1 km	MPC · JPL
205720	2002 AX_{89}	—	January 11, 2002	Socorro	LINEAR	PHO	2.3 km	MPC · JPL
205721	2002 AD_{100}	—	January 8, 2002	Socorro	LINEAR	·	1.0 km	MPC · JPL
205722	2002 AU_{102}	—	January 8, 2002	Socorro	LINEAR	·	2.3 km	MPC · JPL
205723	2002 AL_{106}	—	January 9, 2002	Socorro	LINEAR	MAS	1.2 km	MPC · JPL
205724	2002 AC_{113}	—	January 9, 2002	Socorro	LINEAR	·	770 m	MPC · JPL
205725	2002 AT_{114}	—	January 9, 2002	Socorro	LINEAR	·	1.3 km	MPC · JPL
205726	2002 AP_{124}	—	January 9, 2002	Socorro	LINEAR	NYS	1.4 km	MPC · JPL
205727	2002 AN_{134}	—	January 9, 2002	Socorro	LINEAR	·	1.1 km	MPC · JPL
205728	2002 AQ_{142}	—	January 13, 2002	Socorro	LINEAR	·	1.3 km	MPC · JPL
205729	2002 AZ_{146}	—	January 14, 2002	Socorro	LINEAR	·	1.0 km	MPC · JPL
205730	2002 AH_{151}	—	January 14, 2002	Socorro	LINEAR	·	1.4 km	MPC · JPL
205731	2002 AU_{151}	—	January 14, 2002	Socorro	LINEAR	·	1.8 km	MPC · JPL
205732	2002 AZ_{151}	—	January 14, 2002	Socorro	LINEAR	MAS	1.1 km	MPC · JPL
205733	2002 AM_{160}	—	January 13, 2002	Socorro	LINEAR	·	1.3 km	MPC · JPL
205734	2002 AM_{163}	—	January 13, 2002	Socorro	LINEAR	·	1.1 km	MPC · JPL
205735	2002 AM_{164}	—	January 13, 2002	Socorro	LINEAR	·	1.0 km	MPC · JPL
205736	2002 AG_{171}	—	January 14, 2002	Socorro	LINEAR	·	1.3 km	MPC · JPL
205737	2002 AS_{171}	—	January 14, 2002	Socorro	LINEAR	·	820 m	MPC · JPL
205738	2002 AF_{177}	—	January 14, 2002	Socorro	LINEAR	V	910 m	MPC · JPL
205739	2002 AF_{196}	—	January 12, 2002	Palomar	NEAT	·	980 m	MPC · JPL
205740	2002 AM_{197}	—	January 14, 2002	Socorro	LINEAR	·	1.3 km	MPC · JPL
205741	2002 AA_{203}	—	January 14, 2002	Socorro	LINEAR	·	1.0 km	MPC · JPL
205742	2002 BW_{13}	—	January 19, 2002	Socorro	LINEAR	·	1.0 km	MPC · JPL
205743	2002 BZ_{13}	—	January 19, 2002	Socorro	LINEAR	·	970 m	MPC · JPL
205744	2002 BK_{25}	—	January 25, 2002	Palomar	NEAT	APO +1km	790 m	MPC · JPL
205745	2002 CK_{4}	—	February 7, 2002	Socorro	LINEAR	·	2.5 km	MPC · JPL
205746	2002 CY_{15}	—	February 9, 2002	Desert Eagle	W. K. Y. Yeung	·	1.5 km	MPC · JPL
205747	2002 CG_{17}	—	February 6, 2002	Socorro	LINEAR	·	2.0 km	MPC · JPL
205748	2002 CT_{18}	—	February 6, 2002	Socorro	LINEAR	·	2.2 km	MPC · JPL
205749	2002 CW_{18}	—	February 6, 2002	Socorro	LINEAR	V	1.3 km	MPC · JPL
205750	2002 CY_{18}	—	February 6, 2002	Socorro	LINEAR	·	890 m	MPC · JPL
205751	2002 CX_{19}	—	February 4, 2002	Palomar	NEAT	·	1.7 km	MPC · JPL
205752	2002 CM_{21}	—	February 5, 2002	Palomar	NEAT	·	1.2 km	MPC · JPL
205753	2002 CR_{22}	—	February 5, 2002	Palomar	NEAT	·	1.6 km	MPC · JPL
205754	2002 CU_{23}	—	February 6, 2002	Palomar	NEAT	·	1.4 km	MPC · JPL
205755	2002 CN_{25}	—	February 7, 2002	Socorro	LINEAR	PHO	1.6 km	MPC · JPL
205756	2002 CS_{26}	—	February 6, 2002	Socorro	LINEAR	·	1.3 km	MPC · JPL
205757	2002 CY_{26}	—	February 6, 2002	Socorro	LINEAR	·	1.3 km	MPC · JPL
205758	2002 CT_{28}	—	February 6, 2002	Socorro	LINEAR	·	1.4 km	MPC · JPL
205759	2002 CD_{34}	—	February 6, 2002	Socorro	LINEAR	·	1.4 km	MPC · JPL
205760	2002 CN_{34}	—	February 6, 2002	Socorro	LINEAR	·	1.5 km	MPC · JPL
205761	2002 CC_{35}	—	February 6, 2002	Socorro	LINEAR	·	1.9 km	MPC · JPL
205762	2002 CE_{35}	—	February 6, 2002	Socorro	LINEAR	·	1.7 km	MPC · JPL
205763	2002 CM_{35}	—	February 7, 2002	Socorro	LINEAR	·	1.8 km	MPC · JPL
205764	2002 CZ_{37}	—	February 7, 2002	Socorro	LINEAR	·	1.1 km	MPC · JPL
205765	2002 CB_{38}	—	February 7, 2002	Socorro	LINEAR	V	1.1 km	MPC · JPL
205766	2002 CU_{38}	—	February 7, 2002	Socorro	LINEAR	·	1.2 km	MPC · JPL
205767	2002 CO_{43}	—	February 6, 2002	Socorro	LINEAR	·	1.2 km	MPC · JPL
205768	2002 CB_{55}	—	February 7, 2002	Socorro	LINEAR	·	1.2 km	MPC · JPL
205769	2002 CC_{62}	—	February 6, 2002	Socorro	LINEAR	·	1.6 km	MPC · JPL
205770	2002 CD_{63}	—	February 6, 2002	Socorro	LINEAR	PHO	1.5 km	MPC · JPL
205771	2002 CV_{66}	—	February 7, 2002	Socorro	LINEAR	·	1 km	MPC · JPL
205772	2002 CX_{66}	—	February 7, 2002	Socorro	LINEAR	·	1.4 km	MPC · JPL
205773	2002 CY_{66}	—	February 7, 2002	Socorro	LINEAR	·	1.2 km	MPC · JPL
205774	2002 CH_{67}	—	February 7, 2002	Socorro	LINEAR	·	1.2 km	MPC · JPL
205775	2002 CV_{67}	—	February 7, 2002	Socorro	LINEAR	·	1.3 km	MPC · JPL
205776	2002 CK_{70}	—	February 7, 2002	Socorro	LINEAR	V	1.0 km	MPC · JPL
205777	2002 CE_{71}	—	February 7, 2002	Socorro	LINEAR	·	1.9 km	MPC · JPL
205778	2002 CC_{72}	—	February 7, 2002	Socorro	LINEAR	V	970 m	MPC · JPL
205779	2002 CR_{74}	—	February 7, 2002	Socorro	LINEAR	·	1.6 km	MPC · JPL
205780	2002 CZ_{75}	—	February 7, 2002	Socorro	LINEAR	·	1.6 km	MPC · JPL
205781	2002 CO_{77}	—	February 7, 2002	Socorro	LINEAR	·	1.5 km	MPC · JPL
205782	2002 CQ_{79}	—	February 7, 2002	Socorro	LINEAR	MAS	1.0 km	MPC · JPL
205783	2002 CD_{87}	—	February 7, 2002	Socorro	LINEAR	·	1.8 km	MPC · JPL
205784	2002 CV_{90}	—	February 7, 2002	Socorro	LINEAR	·	1.7 km	MPC · JPL
205785	2002 CP_{92}	—	February 7, 2002	Socorro	LINEAR	(2076)	1.2 km	MPC · JPL
205786	2002 CR_{95}	—	February 7, 2002	Socorro	LINEAR	·	2.4 km	MPC · JPL
205787	2002 CN_{105}	—	February 7, 2002	Socorro	LINEAR	·	1.6 km	MPC · JPL
205788	2002 CX_{119}	—	February 7, 2002	Socorro	LINEAR	·	1.8 km	MPC · JPL
205789	2002 CO_{122}	—	February 7, 2002	Socorro	LINEAR	·	1.6 km	MPC · JPL
205790	2002 CT_{123}	—	February 7, 2002	Socorro	LINEAR	ERI	2.7 km	MPC · JPL
205791	2002 CL_{126}	—	February 7, 2002	Socorro	LINEAR	·	1.5 km	MPC · JPL
205792	2002 CT_{126}	—	February 7, 2002	Socorro	LINEAR	·	1.2 km	MPC · JPL
205793	2002 CY_{126}	—	February 7, 2002	Socorro	LINEAR	NYS	880 m	MPC · JPL
205794	2002 CA_{127}	—	February 7, 2002	Socorro	LINEAR	·	940 m	MPC · JPL
205795	2002 CX_{132}	—	February 7, 2002	Socorro	LINEAR	V	1.0 km	MPC · JPL
205796	2002 CK_{139}	—	February 8, 2002	Socorro	LINEAR	(2076)	1.4 km	MPC · JPL
205797	2002 CE_{141}	—	February 8, 2002	Socorro	LINEAR	·	3.0 km	MPC · JPL
205798	2002 CH_{153}	—	February 7, 2002	Kitt Peak	Spacewatch	·	1.4 km	MPC · JPL
205799	2002 CW_{156}	—	February 7, 2002	Socorro	LINEAR	·	1.1 km	MPC · JPL
205800	2002 CR_{158}	—	February 7, 2002	Socorro	LINEAR	MAS	950 m	MPC · JPL

== 205801–205900 ==
back to top

Designation			Discovery			Properties		Ref
Permanent	Provisional	Named after	Date	Site	Discoverer(s)	Category	Diam.	Ref
205801	2002 CM_{161}	—	February 8, 2002	Socorro	LINEAR	·	1.7 km	MPC · JPL
205802	2002 CP_{164}	—	February 8, 2002	Socorro	LINEAR	·	1.7 km	MPC · JPL
205803	2002 CT_{164}	—	February 8, 2002	Socorro	LINEAR	(2076)	1.5 km	MPC · JPL
205804	2002 CV_{165}	—	February 8, 2002	Socorro	LINEAR	·	1.1 km	MPC · JPL
205805	2002 CK_{167}	—	February 8, 2002	Socorro	LINEAR	·	1.8 km	MPC · JPL
205806	2002 CO_{167}	—	February 8, 2002	Socorro	LINEAR	·	2.0 km	MPC · JPL
205807	2002 CA_{169}	—	February 8, 2002	Socorro	LINEAR	·	1.8 km	MPC · JPL
205808	2002 CJ_{170}	—	February 8, 2002	Socorro	LINEAR	·	1.7 km	MPC · JPL
205809	2002 CV_{195}	—	February 10, 2002	Socorro	LINEAR	·	1.5 km	MPC · JPL
205810	2002 CO_{198}	—	February 10, 2002	Socorro	LINEAR	·	1.5 km	MPC · JPL
205811	2002 CF_{201}	—	February 10, 2002	Socorro	LINEAR	·	1.3 km	MPC · JPL
205812	2002 CY_{201}	—	February 10, 2002	Socorro	LINEAR	V	980 m	MPC · JPL
205813	2002 CR_{208}	—	February 10, 2002	Socorro	LINEAR	·	1.8 km	MPC · JPL
205814	2002 CF_{209}	—	February 10, 2002	Socorro	LINEAR	·	1.5 km	MPC · JPL
205815	2002 CU_{209}	—	February 10, 2002	Socorro	LINEAR	·	1.3 km	MPC · JPL
205816	2002 CW_{212}	—	February 10, 2002	Socorro	LINEAR	·	1.5 km	MPC · JPL
205817	2002 CS_{215}	—	February 10, 2002	Socorro	LINEAR	·	2.1 km	MPC · JPL
205818	2002 CN_{219}	—	February 10, 2002	Socorro	LINEAR	·	1.2 km	MPC · JPL
205819	2002 CX_{237}	—	February 11, 2002	Socorro	LINEAR	·	960 m	MPC · JPL
205820	2002 CO_{240}	—	February 11, 2002	Socorro	LINEAR	·	1.4 km	MPC · JPL
205821	2002 CD_{246}	—	February 13, 2002	Kitt Peak	Spacewatch	·	1.0 km	MPC · JPL
205822	2002 CT_{259}	—	February 6, 2002	Haleakala	NEAT	·	1.6 km	MPC · JPL
205823 Michaeldavis	2002 CP_{264}	Michaeldavis	February 8, 2002	Kitt Peak	M. W. Buie	V	920 m	MPC · JPL
205824	2002 CG_{269}	—	February 7, 2002	Kitt Peak	Spacewatch	·	1.7 km	MPC · JPL
205825	2002 CC_{280}	—	February 7, 2002	Palomar	NEAT	·	1.4 km	MPC · JPL
205826	2002 CU_{282}	—	February 8, 2002	Kitt Peak	Spacewatch	·	2.1 km	MPC · JPL
205827	2002 CA_{290}	—	February 10, 2002	Socorro	LINEAR	·	1.4 km	MPC · JPL
205828	2002 CU_{303}	—	February 13, 2002	Kitt Peak	Spacewatch	·	910 m	MPC · JPL
205829	2002 CV_{305}	—	February 3, 2002	Palomar	NEAT	·	1.5 km	MPC · JPL
205830	2002 DM_{10}	—	February 20, 2002	Socorro	LINEAR	·	1.1 km	MPC · JPL
205831	2002 DO_{14}	—	February 16, 2002	Palomar	NEAT	NYS	1.2 km	MPC · JPL
205832	2002 DB_{15}	—	February 16, 2002	Palomar	NEAT	·	2.0 km	MPC · JPL
205833	2002 ES	—	March 5, 2002	Desert Eagle	W. K. Y. Yeung	·	1.3 km	MPC · JPL
205834	2002 EZ_{1}	—	March 9, 2002	Bohyunsan	Bohyunsan	·	1.0 km	MPC · JPL
205835	2002 EN_{9}	—	March 14, 2002	Prescott	P. G. Comba	·	1.2 km	MPC · JPL
205836	2002 EB_{13}	—	March 11, 2002	Palomar	NEAT	PHO	1.6 km	MPC · JPL
205837	2002 EB_{18}	—	March 9, 2002	Kitt Peak	Spacewatch	·	1.4 km	MPC · JPL
205838	2002 EA_{20}	—	March 9, 2002	Socorro	LINEAR	NYS	1.5 km	MPC · JPL
205839	2002 EL_{22}	—	March 10, 2002	Haleakala	NEAT	·	1.6 km	MPC · JPL
205840	2002 EC_{26}	—	March 10, 2002	Anderson Mesa	LONEOS	V	1.0 km	MPC · JPL
205841	2002 EA_{28}	—	March 9, 2002	Socorro	LINEAR	·	1.5 km	MPC · JPL
205842	2002 EZ_{31}	—	March 9, 2002	Palomar	NEAT	NYS	1.3 km	MPC · JPL
205843	2002 ED_{34}	—	March 11, 2002	Palomar	NEAT	·	1.7 km	MPC · JPL
205844	2002 EF_{38}	—	March 10, 2002	Kitt Peak	Spacewatch	MAS	770 m	MPC · JPL
205845	2002 EL_{39}	—	March 9, 2002	Socorro	LINEAR	·	1.4 km	MPC · JPL
205846	2002 EB_{46}	—	March 11, 2002	Palomar	NEAT	·	1.4 km	MPC · JPL
205847	2002 ED_{46}	—	March 11, 2002	Palomar	NEAT	·	1.6 km	MPC · JPL
205848	2002 ER_{47}	—	March 12, 2002	Palomar	NEAT	NYS	1.0 km	MPC · JPL
205849	2002 EL_{54}	—	March 14, 2002	Socorro	LINEAR	·	1.3 km	MPC · JPL
205850	2002 EX_{54}	—	March 9, 2002	Socorro	LINEAR	·	900 m	MPC · JPL
205851	2002 EH_{57}	—	March 13, 2002	Socorro	LINEAR	V	950 m	MPC · JPL
205852	2002 EY_{61}	—	March 13, 2002	Socorro	LINEAR	·	1.6 km	MPC · JPL
205853	2002 EB_{65}	—	March 13, 2002	Socorro	LINEAR	·	870 m	MPC · JPL
205854	2002 EJ_{68}	—	March 13, 2002	Socorro	LINEAR	NYS	1.5 km	MPC · JPL
205855	2002 EE_{70}	—	March 13, 2002	Socorro	LINEAR	·	1.7 km	MPC · JPL
205856	2002 EF_{78}	—	March 11, 2002	Kitt Peak	Spacewatch	·	1.6 km	MPC · JPL
205857	2002 EV_{78}	—	March 10, 2002	Haleakala	NEAT	·	1.4 km	MPC · JPL
205858	2002 EM_{79}	—	March 10, 2002	Haleakala	NEAT	·	1.8 km	MPC · JPL
205859	2002 EZ_{79}	—	March 12, 2002	Palomar	NEAT	·	1.1 km	MPC · JPL
205860	2002 EQ_{80}	—	March 12, 2002	Palomar	NEAT	NYS	1.7 km	MPC · JPL
205861	2002 EA_{86}	—	March 9, 2002	Socorro	LINEAR	·	1.2 km	MPC · JPL
205862	2002 EQ_{87}	—	March 9, 2002	Socorro	LINEAR	·	2.0 km	MPC · JPL
205863	2002 EO_{88}	—	March 9, 2002	Socorro	LINEAR	NYS	2.1 km	MPC · JPL
205864	2002 EF_{90}	—	March 12, 2002	Socorro	LINEAR	NYS	1.4 km	MPC · JPL
205865	2002 EL_{93}	—	March 14, 2002	Socorro	LINEAR	·	1.6 km	MPC · JPL
205866	2002 EB_{94}	—	March 14, 2002	Socorro	LINEAR	MAS	910 m	MPC · JPL
205867	2002 ES_{96}	—	March 11, 2002	Kitt Peak	Spacewatch	·	1.8 km	MPC · JPL
205868	2002 EC_{97}	—	March 15, 2002	Palomar	NEAT	·	2.0 km	MPC · JPL
205869	2002 EQ_{103}	—	March 9, 2002	Catalina	CSS	NYS	2.0 km	MPC · JPL
205870	2002 EC_{104}	—	March 9, 2002	Anderson Mesa	LONEOS	·	1.3 km	MPC · JPL
205871	2002 EV_{104}	—	March 9, 2002	Socorro	LINEAR	·	1.4 km	MPC · JPL
205872	2002 ER_{105}	—	March 9, 2002	Anderson Mesa	LONEOS	·	1.2 km	MPC · JPL
205873	2002 ES_{105}	—	March 9, 2002	Anderson Mesa	LONEOS	·	2.8 km	MPC · JPL
205874	2002 EW_{108}	—	March 9, 2002	Anderson Mesa	LONEOS	·	1.7 km	MPC · JPL
205875	2002 EO_{110}	—	March 9, 2002	Catalina	CSS	·	1.9 km	MPC · JPL
205876	2002 EV_{110}	—	March 9, 2002	Anderson Mesa	LONEOS	V	1.2 km	MPC · JPL
205877	2002 ES_{116}	—	March 9, 2002	Kitt Peak	Spacewatch	·	1.8 km	MPC · JPL
205878	2002 EP_{127}	—	March 12, 2002	Palomar	NEAT	MAS	880 m	MPC · JPL
205879	2002 ES_{128}	—	March 12, 2002	Palomar	NEAT	·	1.6 km	MPC · JPL
205880	2002 EU_{142}	—	March 12, 2002	Palomar	NEAT	·	1.3 km	MPC · JPL
205881	2002 EK_{144}	—	March 13, 2002	Kitt Peak	Spacewatch	·	1.2 km	MPC · JPL
205882	2002 EO_{146}	—	March 14, 2002	Anderson Mesa	LONEOS	NYS	1.3 km	MPC · JPL
205883	2002 EH_{155}	—	March 5, 2002	Anderson Mesa	LONEOS	·	1.4 km	MPC · JPL
205884	2002 FC_{2}	—	March 19, 2002	Desert Eagle	W. K. Y. Yeung	·	3.0 km	MPC · JPL
205885	2002 FB_{10}	—	March 16, 2002	Socorro	LINEAR	·	1.5 km	MPC · JPL
205886	2002 FP_{15}	—	March 16, 2002	Haleakala	NEAT	MAS	940 m	MPC · JPL
205887	2002 FM_{39}	—	March 16, 2002	Socorro	LINEAR	·	1.5 km	MPC · JPL
205888	2002 GE_{8}	—	April 14, 2002	Desert Eagle	W. K. Y. Yeung	·	2.0 km	MPC · JPL
205889	2002 GF_{10}	—	April 1, 2002	Bergisch Gladbach	W. Bickel	NYS	1.7 km	MPC · JPL
205890	2002 GC_{12}	—	April 15, 2002	Desert Eagle	W. K. Y. Yeung	·	1.2 km	MPC · JPL
205891	2002 GM_{12}	—	April 14, 2002	Socorro	LINEAR	MAS	980 m	MPC · JPL
205892	2002 GY_{42}	—	April 4, 2002	Palomar	NEAT	·	2.1 km	MPC · JPL
205893	2002 GO_{46}	—	April 4, 2002	Haleakala	NEAT	·	2.1 km	MPC · JPL
205894	2002 GG_{50}	—	April 5, 2002	Palomar	NEAT	·	2.1 km	MPC · JPL
205895	2002 GH_{51}	—	April 5, 2002	Anderson Mesa	LONEOS	NYS	1.7 km	MPC · JPL
205896	2002 GX_{52}	—	April 5, 2002	Anderson Mesa	LONEOS	NYS	1.9 km	MPC · JPL
205897	2002 GK_{59}	—	April 8, 2002	Palomar	NEAT	·	1.8 km	MPC · JPL
205898	2002 GT_{61}	—	April 8, 2002	Palomar	NEAT	·	1.5 km	MPC · JPL
205899	2002 GA_{66}	—	April 8, 2002	Palomar	NEAT	·	1.9 km	MPC · JPL
205900	2002 GB_{69}	—	April 8, 2002	Palomar	NEAT	·	1.4 km	MPC · JPL

== 205901–206000 ==
back to top

Designation			Discovery			Properties		Ref
Permanent	Provisional	Named after	Date	Site	Discoverer(s)	Category	Diam.	Ref
205901	2002 GO_{72}	—	April 9, 2002	Anderson Mesa	LONEOS	·	1.7 km	MPC · JPL
205902	2002 GS_{73}	—	April 9, 2002	Palomar	NEAT	MAS	1.3 km	MPC · JPL
205903	2002 GV_{74}	—	April 9, 2002	Kitt Peak	Spacewatch	NYS	1.4 km	MPC · JPL
205904	2002 GZ_{74}	—	April 9, 2002	Kitt Peak	Spacewatch	·	1.6 km	MPC · JPL
205905	2002 GJ_{78}	—	April 9, 2002	Socorro	LINEAR	·	2.0 km	MPC · JPL
205906	2002 GA_{80}	—	April 10, 2002	Socorro	LINEAR	·	1.8 km	MPC · JPL
205907	2002 GG_{84}	—	April 10, 2002	Socorro	LINEAR	·	1.8 km	MPC · JPL
205908	2002 GV_{95}	—	April 9, 2002	Socorro	LINEAR	·	1.7 km	MPC · JPL
205909	2002 GM_{97}	—	April 9, 2002	Kitt Peak	Spacewatch	·	1.4 km	MPC · JPL
205910	2002 GD_{100}	—	April 10, 2002	Socorro	LINEAR	·	1.1 km	MPC · JPL
205911	2002 GA_{104}	—	April 10, 2002	Socorro	LINEAR	V	970 m	MPC · JPL
205912	2002 GC_{107}	—	April 11, 2002	Socorro	LINEAR	·	1.8 km	MPC · JPL
205913	2002 GY_{110}	—	April 10, 2002	Socorro	LINEAR	·	1.7 km	MPC · JPL
205914	2002 GX_{111}	—	April 10, 2002	Socorro	LINEAR	·	1.7 km	MPC · JPL
205915	2002 GO_{118}	—	April 12, 2002	Palomar	NEAT	·	3.5 km	MPC · JPL
205916	2002 GU_{127}	—	April 12, 2002	Socorro	LINEAR	·	1.3 km	MPC · JPL
205917	2002 GT_{135}	—	April 12, 2002	Socorro	LINEAR	·	1.6 km	MPC · JPL
205918	2002 GM_{136}	—	April 12, 2002	Socorro	LINEAR	·	1.0 km	MPC · JPL
205919	2002 GT_{139}	—	April 13, 2002	Palomar	NEAT	·	1.3 km	MPC · JPL
205920	2002 GB_{143}	—	April 13, 2002	Kitt Peak	Spacewatch	NYS	1.5 km	MPC · JPL
205921	2002 GY_{159}	—	April 14, 2002	Haleakala	NEAT	·	2.9 km	MPC · JPL
205922	2002 GQ_{170}	—	April 9, 2002	Socorro	LINEAR	·	1.9 km	MPC · JPL
205923	2002 GG_{171}	—	April 10, 2002	Socorro	LINEAR	V	1.0 km	MPC · JPL
205924	2002 HZ_{7}	—	April 20, 2002	Socorro	LINEAR	·	2.2 km	MPC · JPL
205925	2002 HH_{9}	—	April 16, 2002	Socorro	LINEAR	·	2.2 km	MPC · JPL
205926	2002 HV_{12}	—	April 22, 2002	Socorro	LINEAR	PHO	2.1 km	MPC · JPL
205927	2002 JF_{10}	—	May 7, 2002	Socorro	LINEAR	H	780 m	MPC · JPL
205928	2002 JS_{11}	—	May 6, 2002	Anderson Mesa	LONEOS	NYS	1.9 km	MPC · JPL
205929	2002 JO_{17}	—	May 7, 2002	Palomar	NEAT	MAS	1.0 km	MPC · JPL
205930	2002 JB_{19}	—	May 7, 2002	Palomar	NEAT	V	1.2 km	MPC · JPL
205931	2002 JD_{20}	—	May 6, 2002	Palomar	NEAT	·	1.9 km	MPC · JPL
205932	2002 JA_{22}	—	May 7, 2002	Socorro	LINEAR	·	2.5 km	MPC · JPL
205933	2002 JD_{26}	—	May 8, 2002	Socorro	LINEAR	ERI	3.7 km	MPC · JPL
205934	2002 JF_{29}	—	May 9, 2002	Socorro	LINEAR	·	2.0 km	MPC · JPL
205935	2002 JW_{33}	—	May 9, 2002	Socorro	LINEAR	·	3.0 km	MPC · JPL
205936	2002 JE_{36}	—	May 9, 2002	Socorro	LINEAR	·	2.5 km	MPC · JPL
205937	2002 JT_{39}	—	May 10, 2002	Desert Eagle	W. K. Y. Yeung	·	2.5 km	MPC · JPL
205938	2002 JB_{41}	—	May 8, 2002	Socorro	LINEAR	·	1.3 km	MPC · JPL
205939	2002 JG_{42}	—	May 8, 2002	Socorro	LINEAR	NYS	2.0 km	MPC · JPL
205940	2002 JA_{46}	—	May 9, 2002	Socorro	LINEAR	ERI	2.5 km	MPC · JPL
205941	2002 JW_{50}	—	May 9, 2002	Socorro	LINEAR	·	1.5 km	MPC · JPL
205942	2002 JQ_{53}	—	May 9, 2002	Socorro	LINEAR	·	1.4 km	MPC · JPL
205943	2002 JU_{55}	—	May 9, 2002	Socorro	LINEAR	·	1.6 km	MPC · JPL
205944	2002 JV_{62}	—	May 8, 2002	Socorro	LINEAR	ERI	2.7 km	MPC · JPL
205945	2002 JH_{71}	—	May 8, 2002	Socorro	LINEAR	·	1.6 km	MPC · JPL
205946	2002 JH_{77}	—	May 11, 2002	Socorro	LINEAR	V	1.0 km	MPC · JPL
205947	2002 JP_{80}	—	May 11, 2002	Socorro	LINEAR	·	1.5 km	MPC · JPL
205948	2002 JO_{86}	—	May 11, 2002	Socorro	LINEAR	·	2.0 km	MPC · JPL
205949	2002 JZ_{89}	—	May 11, 2002	Socorro	LINEAR	NYS	1.6 km	MPC · JPL
205950	2002 JS_{95}	—	May 11, 2002	Socorro	LINEAR	·	2.6 km	MPC · JPL
205951	2002 JK_{104}	—	May 10, 2002	Socorro	LINEAR	NYS	1.7 km	MPC · JPL
205952	2002 JS_{121}	—	May 5, 2002	Palomar	NEAT	PHO	1.3 km	MPC · JPL
205953	2002 JH_{122}	—	May 6, 2002	Anderson Mesa	LONEOS	·	1.4 km	MPC · JPL
205954	2002 JR_{122}	—	May 6, 2002	Palomar	NEAT	H	870 m	MPC · JPL
205955	2002 JC_{133}	—	May 9, 2002	Socorro	LINEAR	·	2.2 km	MPC · JPL
205956	2002 JA_{138}	—	May 9, 2002	Palomar	NEAT	·	1.4 km	MPC · JPL
205957	2002 JZ_{141}	—	May 11, 2002	Socorro	LINEAR	·	1.5 km	MPC · JPL
205958	2002 KN_{5}	—	May 16, 2002	Socorro	LINEAR	·	2.1 km	MPC · JPL
205959	2002 KQ_{10}	—	May 16, 2002	Socorro	LINEAR	NYS	1.8 km	MPC · JPL
205960	2002 KR_{14}	—	May 30, 2002	Palomar	NEAT	·	1.9 km	MPC · JPL
205961	2002 KG_{15}	—	May 23, 2002	Palomar	NEAT	·	1.4 km	MPC · JPL
205962	2002 LE_{4}	—	June 5, 2002	Socorro	LINEAR	NYS	1.9 km	MPC · JPL
205963	2002 LD_{14}	—	June 6, 2002	Socorro	LINEAR	NYS	1.6 km	MPC · JPL
205964	2002 LU_{20}	—	June 6, 2002	Socorro	LINEAR	·	3.8 km	MPC · JPL
205965	2002 LH_{29}	—	June 9, 2002	Socorro	LINEAR	·	5.6 km	MPC · JPL
205966	2002 LV_{29}	—	June 9, 2002	Haleakala	NEAT	·	4.2 km	MPC · JPL
205967	2002 LX_{39}	—	June 10, 2002	Socorro	LINEAR	EUN	1.8 km	MPC · JPL
205968	2002 LT_{61}	—	June 3, 2002	Palomar	NEAT	·	1.2 km	MPC · JPL
205969	2002 LO_{62}	—	June 14, 2002	Palomar	NEAT	EOS	2.7 km	MPC · JPL
205970	2002 NL_{2}	—	July 6, 2002	Palomar	NEAT	·	2.7 km	MPC · JPL
205971	2002 NO_{3}	—	July 8, 2002	Palomar	NEAT	·	2.4 km	MPC · JPL
205972	2002 NY_{4}	—	July 10, 2002	Campo Imperatore	CINEOS	·	2.3 km	MPC · JPL
205973	2002 NO_{6}	—	July 11, 2002	Campo Imperatore	CINEOS	·	1.5 km	MPC · JPL
205974	2002 NQ_{18}	—	July 9, 2002	Socorro	LINEAR	·	1.4 km	MPC · JPL
205975	2002 ND_{20}	—	July 9, 2002	Socorro	LINEAR	slow	2.4 km	MPC · JPL
205976	2002 NH_{21}	—	July 9, 2002	Socorro	LINEAR	·	1.8 km	MPC · JPL
205977	2002 NA_{23}	—	July 9, 2002	Socorro	LINEAR	·	2.7 km	MPC · JPL
205978	2002 NZ_{39}	—	July 14, 2002	Palomar	NEAT	THM	3.5 km	MPC · JPL
205979	2002 NB_{42}	—	July 14, 2002	Palomar	NEAT	·	3.0 km	MPC · JPL
205980	2002 NC_{42}	—	July 14, 2002	Palomar	NEAT	·	5.0 km	MPC · JPL
205981	2002 NG_{44}	—	July 12, 2002	Palomar	NEAT	·	2.8 km	MPC · JPL
205982	2002 NN_{45}	—	July 13, 2002	Palomar	NEAT	·	4.9 km	MPC · JPL
205983	2002 NT_{45}	—	July 13, 2002	Palomar	NEAT	·	2.3 km	MPC · JPL
205984	2002 NN_{48}	—	July 13, 2002	Haleakala	NEAT	·	3.3 km	MPC · JPL
205985	2002 NY_{58}	—	July 4, 2002	Palomar	NEAT	·	2.4 km	MPC · JPL
205986	2002 NX_{62}	—	July 14, 2002	Palomar	NEAT	·	2.4 km	MPC · JPL
205987	2002 NX_{64}	—	July 2, 2002	Palomar	NEAT	·	1.6 km	MPC · JPL
205988	2002 NR_{67}	—	July 5, 2002	Palomar	NEAT	·	2.8 km	MPC · JPL
205989	2002 NY_{67}	—	July 14, 2002	Palomar	NEAT	·	2.5 km	MPC · JPL
205990	2002 OE_{12}	—	July 18, 2002	Socorro	LINEAR	·	5.6 km	MPC · JPL
205991	2002 OP_{22}	—	July 17, 2002	Socorro	LINEAR	MAR	2.1 km	MPC · JPL
205992	2002 OD_{24}	—	July 23, 2002	Palomar	NEAT	·	2.5 km	MPC · JPL
205993	2002 OZ_{24}	—	July 23, 2002	Palomar	S. F. Hönig	·	1.8 km	MPC · JPL
205994	2002 OO_{25}	—	July 30, 2002	Haleakala	Lowe, A.	·	2.7 km	MPC · JPL
205995	2002 OB_{29}	—	July 22, 2002	Palomar	NEAT	·	2.8 km	MPC · JPL
205996	2002 PK_{9}	—	August 5, 2002	Palomar	NEAT	·	3.6 km	MPC · JPL
205997	2002 PM_{16}	—	August 6, 2002	Palomar	NEAT	·	2.3 km	MPC · JPL
205998	2002 PH_{20}	—	August 6, 2002	Palomar	NEAT	·	1.6 km	MPC · JPL
205999	2002 PY_{25}	—	August 6, 2002	Palomar	NEAT	MAS	1.1 km	MPC · JPL
206000	2002 PH_{31}	—	August 6, 2002	Palomar	NEAT	BRA	2.3 km	MPC · JPL

back to top

== See also ==
- Meanings of minor-planet names: 205001–206000
