= List of minor planets: 784001–785000 =

The following is a partial list of minor planets, running from minor-planet number 784001 through 785000, inclusive. The primary data for this and other partial lists is based on JPL's "Small-Body Orbital Elements" and data available from the Minor Planet Center. Critical list information is also provided by the MPC, unless otherwise specified from Lowell Observatory. A detailed description of the table's columns and additional sources are given on the main page including a complete list of every page in this series, and a statistical break-up on the dynamical classification of minor planets.

Also see the summary list of all named bodies in numerical and alphabetical order, and the corresponding naming citations for the number range of this particular list. New namings may only be added to this list after official publication, as the preannouncement of names is condemned by the Working Group for Small Bodies Nomenclature of the International Astronomical Union.

Near-Earth obj.	MBA (inner)	MBA (outer)	Centaur
Mars-crosser	MBA (middle)	Jupiter trojan	Trans-Neptunian obj.
Unclassified

== 784001–784100 ==
Designation			Discovery			Properties		Ref
Permanent	Provisional	Named after	Date	Site	Discoverer(s)	Category	Diam.	Ref
784001	2014 WX_{373}	—	July 25, 2008	Mount Lemmon	Mount Lemmon Survey	·	1.7 km	MPC · JPL
784002	2014 WH_{375}	—	November 22, 2014	Mount Lemmon	Mount Lemmon Survey	AGN	860 m	MPC · JPL
784003	2014 WN_{377}	—	October 29, 2014	Haleakala	Pan-STARRS 1	·	1.4 km	MPC · JPL
784004	2014 WV_{377}	—	July 15, 2013	Haleakala	Pan-STARRS 1	·	2.4 km	MPC · JPL
784005	2014 WZ_{379}	—	November 22, 2014	Mount Lemmon	Mount Lemmon Survey	·	1.2 km	MPC · JPL
784006	2014 WO_{382}	—	October 22, 2008	Kitt Peak	Spacewatch	·	2.6 km	MPC · JPL
784007	2014 WL_{385}	—	November 23, 2014	Haleakala	Pan-STARRS 1	EOS	1.2 km	MPC · JPL
784008	2014 WE_{387}	—	November 23, 2014	Haleakala	Pan-STARRS 1	·	2.2 km	MPC · JPL
784009	2014 WQ_{391}	—	September 21, 2009	Mount Lemmon	Mount Lemmon Survey	·	1.5 km	MPC · JPL
784010	2014 WD_{394}	—	February 12, 2011	Mount Lemmon	Mount Lemmon Survey	·	1.1 km	MPC · JPL
784011	2014 WA_{398}	—	November 25, 2014	Mount Lemmon	Mount Lemmon Survey	·	1.8 km	MPC · JPL
784012	2014 WH_{402}	—	September 23, 2008	Kitt Peak	Spacewatch	·	2.1 km	MPC · JPL
784013	2014 WA_{403}	—	January 30, 2011	Haleakala	Pan-STARRS 1	·	1.2 km	MPC · JPL
784014	2014 WH_{406}	—	November 26, 2014	Haleakala	Pan-STARRS 1	·	1.2 km	MPC · JPL
784015	2014 WZ_{409}	—	November 26, 2014	Haleakala	Pan-STARRS 1	·	1.2 km	MPC · JPL
784016	2014 WH_{411}	—	October 25, 2009	Mount Lemmon	Mount Lemmon Survey	·	1.4 km	MPC · JPL
784017	2014 WD_{412}	—	November 26, 2014	Haleakala	Pan-STARRS 1	·	1.2 km	MPC · JPL
784018	2014 WE_{412}	—	November 26, 2014	Haleakala	Pan-STARRS 1	·	2.4 km	MPC · JPL
784019	2014 WO_{413}	—	November 26, 2014	Haleakala	Pan-STARRS 1	EOS	1.2 km	MPC · JPL
784020	2014 WU_{415}	—	November 26, 2014	Haleakala	Pan-STARRS 1	·	1.9 km	MPC · JPL
784021	2014 WX_{422}	—	July 15, 2013	Haleakala	Pan-STARRS 1	·	1.4 km	MPC · JPL
784022	2014 WX_{432}	—	November 22, 2014	Mount Lemmon	Mount Lemmon Survey	EOS	920 m	MPC · JPL
784023	2014 WH_{433}	—	November 14, 2014	Kitt Peak	Spacewatch	THM	1.5 km	MPC · JPL
784024	2014 WY_{439}	—	November 27, 2014	Haleakala	Pan-STARRS 1	HOF	1.8 km	MPC · JPL
784025	2014 WA_{443}	—	November 27, 2014	Haleakala	Pan-STARRS 1	·	2.1 km	MPC · JPL
784026	2014 WC_{447}	—	November 27, 2014	Haleakala	Pan-STARRS 1	·	2.1 km	MPC · JPL
784027	2014 WC_{448}	—	September 26, 2009	Kitt Peak	Spacewatch	MRX	710 m	MPC · JPL
784028	2014 WF_{448}	—	November 27, 2014	Haleakala	Pan-STARRS 1	·	1.1 km	MPC · JPL
784029	2014 WM_{448}	—	October 5, 2004	Kitt Peak	Spacewatch	·	1.4 km	MPC · JPL
784030	2014 WG_{451}	—	August 7, 2013	Kitt Peak	Spacewatch	·	1.9 km	MPC · JPL
784031	2014 WM_{451}	—	November 27, 2014	Haleakala	Pan-STARRS 1	·	1.6 km	MPC · JPL
784032	2014 WZ_{456}	—	January 28, 2011	Mount Lemmon	Mount Lemmon Survey	AGN	780 m	MPC · JPL
784033	2014 WS_{461}	—	February 25, 2011	Mount Lemmon	Mount Lemmon Survey	KOR	940 m	MPC · JPL
784034	2014 WE_{462}	—	January 7, 2006	Kitt Peak	Spacewatch	AGN	790 m	MPC · JPL
784035	2014 WT_{464}	—	September 20, 2009	Kitt Peak	Spacewatch	·	1.5 km	MPC · JPL
784036	2014 WW_{480}	—	March 9, 2011	Kitt Peak	Spacewatch	(1547)	1.2 km	MPC · JPL
784037	2014 WE_{483}	—	October 5, 2014	Mount Lemmon	Mount Lemmon Survey	·	1.6 km	MPC · JPL
784038	2014 WN_{483}	—	November 29, 2014	Mount Lemmon	Mount Lemmon Survey	·	1.4 km	MPC · JPL
784039	2014 WY_{485}	—	November 23, 2014	Haleakala	Pan-STARRS 1	·	1.6 km	MPC · JPL
784040	2014 WO_{492}	—	November 26, 2014	Haleakala	Pan-STARRS 1	EOS	1.3 km	MPC · JPL
784041	2014 WZ_{493}	—	November 28, 2014	Haleakala	Pan-STARRS 1	·	960 m	MPC · JPL
784042	2014 WT_{495}	—	November 25, 2013	Oukaïmeden	M. Ory	T_{j} (2.98) · 3:2	4.1 km	MPC · JPL
784043	2014 WK_{502}	—	August 23, 2014	Haleakala	Pan-STARRS 1	·	1.4 km	MPC · JPL
784044	2014 WE_{505}	—	October 30, 2014	Haleakala	Pan-STARRS 1	·	1.9 km	MPC · JPL
784045	2014 WB_{515}	—	November 29, 2014	Haleakala	Pan-STARRS 1	·	1.3 km	MPC · JPL
784046	2014 WN_{515}	—	December 17, 2009	Kitt Peak	Spacewatch	THM	1.7 km	MPC · JPL
784047	2014 WV_{515}	—	November 26, 2014	Haleakala	Pan-STARRS 1	·	1.9 km	MPC · JPL
784048	2014 WM_{516}	—	November 20, 2014	Haleakala	Pan-STARRS 1	·	2.4 km	MPC · JPL
784049	2014 WW_{518}	—	November 17, 2014	Haleakala	Pan-STARRS 1	·	1.2 km	MPC · JPL
784050	2014 WV_{520}	—	September 29, 2009	Mount Lemmon	Mount Lemmon Survey	·	1.3 km	MPC · JPL
784051	2014 WZ_{520}	—	January 28, 2011	Mount Lemmon	Mount Lemmon Survey	PAD	1.1 km	MPC · JPL
784052	2014 WP_{522}	—	January 13, 2011	Mount Lemmon	Mount Lemmon Survey	·	1.1 km	MPC · JPL
784053	2014 WD_{523}	—	August 12, 2013	Haleakala	Pan-STARRS 1	·	2.1 km	MPC · JPL
784054	2014 WF_{526}	—	November 21, 2014	Haleakala	Pan-STARRS 1	·	1.1 km	MPC · JPL
784055	2014 WK_{528}	—	September 18, 2009	Kitt Peak	Spacewatch	AGN	790 m	MPC · JPL
784056	2014 WS_{528}	—	November 22, 2014	Haleakala	Pan-STARRS 1	·	1.3 km	MPC · JPL
784057	2014 WD_{531}	—	November 26, 2014	Haleakala	Pan-STARRS 1	·	1.4 km	MPC · JPL
784058	2014 WU_{531}	—	April 14, 2011	Mount Lemmon	Mount Lemmon Survey	·	1.6 km	MPC · JPL
784059	2014 WK_{536}	—	July 14, 2013	Haleakala	Pan-STARRS 1	·	1.3 km	MPC · JPL
784060	2014 WW_{536}	—	March 26, 2017	Haleakala	Pan-STARRS 1	·	1.4 km	MPC · JPL
784061	2014 WZ_{538}	—	February 3, 2016	Haleakala	Pan-STARRS 1	·	2.3 km	MPC · JPL
784062	2014 WV_{541}	—	November 23, 2014	Mount Lemmon	Mount Lemmon Survey	BRA	1.0 km	MPC · JPL
784063	2014 WJ_{544}	—	November 17, 2014	Haleakala	Pan-STARRS 1	·	1.7 km	MPC · JPL
784064	2014 WW_{546}	—	February 5, 2016	Haleakala	Pan-STARRS 1	·	1.5 km	MPC · JPL
784065	2014 WG_{548}	—	November 21, 2009	Kitt Peak	Spacewatch	·	1.3 km	MPC · JPL
784066	2014 WX_{552}	—	November 21, 2014	Haleakala	Pan-STARRS 1	·	1.5 km	MPC · JPL
784067	2014 WT_{559}	—	November 20, 2014	Mount Lemmon	Mount Lemmon Survey	·	1.5 km	MPC · JPL
784068	2014 WR_{561}	—	November 29, 2014	Haleakala	Pan-STARRS 1	·	1.6 km	MPC · JPL
784069	2014 WJ_{562}	—	November 22, 2014	Mount Lemmon	Mount Lemmon Survey	·	1.6 km	MPC · JPL
784070	2014 WD_{563}	—	November 30, 2014	Kitt Peak	Spacewatch	·	1.5 km	MPC · JPL
784071	2014 WS_{564}	—	November 29, 2014	Mount Lemmon	Mount Lemmon Survey	VER	2.0 km	MPC · JPL
784072	2014 WG_{567}	—	November 18, 2014	Haleakala	Pan-STARRS 1	TEL	910 m	MPC · JPL
784073	2014 WE_{568}	—	November 17, 2014	Haleakala	Pan-STARRS 1	·	1.9 km	MPC · JPL
784074	2014 WE_{569}	—	November 17, 2014	Haleakala	Pan-STARRS 1	·	1.0 km	MPC · JPL
784075	2014 WF_{569}	—	November 20, 2014	Haleakala	Pan-STARRS 1	·	1.5 km	MPC · JPL
784076	2014 WH_{569}	—	November 29, 2014	Mount Lemmon	Mount Lemmon Survey	·	1.4 km	MPC · JPL
784077	2014 WJ_{570}	—	November 26, 2014	Mount Lemmon	Mount Lemmon Survey	·	1.2 km	MPC · JPL
784078	2014 WB_{573}	—	November 30, 2014	Kitt Peak	Spacewatch	·	660 m	MPC · JPL
784079	2014 WW_{575}	—	November 27, 2014	Mount Lemmon	Mount Lemmon Survey	·	1.0 km	MPC · JPL
784080	2014 WP_{578}	—	November 21, 2014	Haleakala	Pan-STARRS 1	L5	6.0 km	MPC · JPL
784081	2014 WZ_{581}	—	November 26, 2014	Haleakala	Pan-STARRS 1	EOS	1.2 km	MPC · JPL
784082	2014 WH_{584}	—	November 20, 2014	Haleakala	Pan-STARRS 1	·	1.3 km	MPC · JPL
784083	2014 WV_{587}	—	November 26, 2014	Haleakala	Pan-STARRS 1	·	1.2 km	MPC · JPL
784084	2014 WW_{588}	—	November 26, 2014	Haleakala	Pan-STARRS 1	·	2.5 km	MPC · JPL
784085	2014 WZ_{588}	—	November 19, 2014	Haleakala	Pan-STARRS 1	·	2.5 km	MPC · JPL
784086	2014 WJ_{589}	—	November 17, 2014	Haleakala	Pan-STARRS 1	·	1.2 km	MPC · JPL
784087	2014 WL_{589}	—	November 27, 2014	Haleakala	Pan-STARRS 1	·	1.7 km	MPC · JPL
784088	2014 WU_{589}	—	November 17, 2014	Haleakala	Pan-STARRS 1	·	1.5 km	MPC · JPL
784089	2014 WL_{590}	—	November 21, 2014	Haleakala	Pan-STARRS 1	L5	7.5 km	MPC · JPL
784090	2014 WS_{590}	—	November 16, 2014	Mount Lemmon	Mount Lemmon Survey	·	1.2 km	MPC · JPL
784091	2014 WY_{590}	—	November 29, 2014	Mount Lemmon	Mount Lemmon Survey	HOF	2.2 km	MPC · JPL
784092	2014 WJ_{591}	—	November 17, 2014	Haleakala	Pan-STARRS 1	·	850 m	MPC · JPL
784093	2014 WE_{592}	—	November 17, 2014	Haleakala	Pan-STARRS 1	AGN	870 m	MPC · JPL
784094	2014 WL_{592}	—	November 27, 2014	Haleakala	Pan-STARRS 1	HOF	1.8 km	MPC · JPL
784095	2014 WN_{592}	—	November 25, 2014	Haleakala	Pan-STARRS 1	HNS	810 m	MPC · JPL
784096	2014 WX_{592}	—	November 17, 2014	Haleakala	Pan-STARRS 1	·	1.3 km	MPC · JPL
784097	2014 WA_{593}	—	November 16, 2014	Mount Lemmon	Mount Lemmon Survey	·	1.1 km	MPC · JPL
784098	2014 WG_{593}	—	October 13, 2014	Mount Lemmon	Mount Lemmon Survey	·	1.2 km	MPC · JPL
784099	2014 WC_{596}	—	November 21, 2014	Haleakala	Pan-STARRS 1	L5	5.9 km	MPC · JPL
784100	2014 WJ_{596}	—	November 28, 2014	Mount Lemmon	Mount Lemmon Survey	·	1.4 km	MPC · JPL

== 784101–784200 ==
back to top

Designation			Discovery			Properties		Ref
Permanent	Provisional	Named after	Date	Site	Discoverer(s)	Category	Diam.	Ref
784101	2014 WS_{596}	—	November 22, 2014	Mount Lemmon	Mount Lemmon Survey	·	1.5 km	MPC · JPL
784102	2014 WF_{597}	—	November 27, 2014	Mount Lemmon	Mount Lemmon Survey	·	1.2 km	MPC · JPL
784103	2014 WW_{600}	—	November 27, 2014	Haleakala	Pan-STARRS 1	·	1.3 km	MPC · JPL
784104	2014 WG_{601}	—	November 27, 2014	Haleakala	Pan-STARRS 1	·	1.8 km	MPC · JPL
784105	2014 WE_{603}	—	November 17, 2014	Mount Lemmon	Mount Lemmon Survey	AGN	870 m	MPC · JPL
784106	2014 WJ_{603}	—	November 30, 2014	Mount Lemmon	Mount Lemmon Survey	AGN	790 m	MPC · JPL
784107	2014 WP_{603}	—	November 29, 2014	Mount Lemmon	Mount Lemmon Survey	·	1.6 km	MPC · JPL
784108	2014 WR_{609}	—	November 23, 2014	Mount Lemmon	Mount Lemmon Survey	·	930 m	MPC · JPL
784109	2014 WC_{613}	—	November 23, 2014	Haleakala	Pan-STARRS 1	·	1.5 km	MPC · JPL
784110	2014 WG_{616}	—	November 17, 2014	Haleakala	Pan-STARRS 1	·	1.2 km	MPC · JPL
784111	2014 XQ_{1}	—	September 16, 2009	Mount Lemmon	Mount Lemmon Survey	·	1.2 km	MPC · JPL
784112	2014 XN_{11}	—	November 29, 2014	Mount Lemmon	Mount Lemmon Survey	·	1.4 km	MPC · JPL
784113	2014 XA_{12}	—	September 28, 2009	Kitt Peak	Spacewatch	AGN	830 m	MPC · JPL
784114	2014 XF_{14}	—	December 10, 2014	Mount Lemmon	Mount Lemmon Survey	·	1.7 km	MPC · JPL
784115	2014 XQ_{14}	—	February 11, 2011	Mount Lemmon	Mount Lemmon Survey	·	1.6 km	MPC · JPL
784116	2014 XS_{14}	—	May 16, 2012	Mount Lemmon	Mount Lemmon Survey	·	1.7 km	MPC · JPL
784117	2014 XZ_{16}	—	November 19, 2014	Mount Lemmon	Mount Lemmon Survey	HOF	1.8 km	MPC · JPL
784118	2014 XA_{18}	—	August 12, 2013	Haleakala	Pan-STARRS 1	·	1.4 km	MPC · JPL
784119	2014 XB_{22}	—	October 10, 2005	Siding Spring	SSS	·	2.0 km	MPC · JPL
784120	2014 XH_{25}	—	March 1, 2011	Mount Lemmon	Mount Lemmon Survey	KOR	1.1 km	MPC · JPL
784121	2014 XS_{29}	—	December 13, 2014	Haleakala	Pan-STARRS 1	·	1.2 km	MPC · JPL
784122	2014 XM_{32}	—	December 8, 2010	Mount Lemmon	Mount Lemmon Survey	526	1.8 km	MPC · JPL
784123	2014 XY_{32}	—	November 18, 2014	Mount Lemmon	Mount Lemmon Survey	AGN	870 m	MPC · JPL
784124	2014 XR_{33}	—	November 17, 2014	Haleakala	Pan-STARRS 1	·	1.3 km	MPC · JPL
784125	2014 XH_{34}	—	December 13, 2014	Haleakala	Pan-STARRS 1	·	1.2 km	MPC · JPL
784126	2014 XT_{34}	—	November 22, 2014	Mount Lemmon	Mount Lemmon Survey	·	1.3 km	MPC · JPL
784127	2014 XJ_{38}	—	December 15, 2014	Mount Lemmon	Mount Lemmon Survey	TIR	2.2 km	MPC · JPL
784128	2014 XE_{43}	—	December 1, 2008	Kitt Peak	Spacewatch	·	1.9 km	MPC · JPL
784129	2014 XQ_{43}	—	December 10, 2014	Haleakala	Pan-STARRS 1	TIR	2.0 km	MPC · JPL
784130	2014 XD_{49}	—	December 11, 2014	Mount Lemmon	Mount Lemmon Survey	EOS	1.3 km	MPC · JPL
784131	2014 XN_{49}	—	February 5, 2011	Haleakala	Pan-STARRS 1	MRX	680 m	MPC · JPL
784132	2014 XA_{50}	—	December 1, 2014	Haleakala	Pan-STARRS 1	·	1.8 km	MPC · JPL
784133	2014 XZ_{50}	—	December 3, 2014	Haleakala	Pan-STARRS 1	·	1.3 km	MPC · JPL
784134	2014 XO_{51}	—	December 1, 2014	Haleakala	Pan-STARRS 1	·	1.4 km	MPC · JPL
784135	2014 XN_{52}	—	December 11, 2014	Mount Lemmon	Mount Lemmon Survey	·	1.3 km	MPC · JPL
784136	2014 XF_{56}	—	December 1, 2014	Haleakala	Pan-STARRS 1	·	2.4 km	MPC · JPL
784137	2014 XW_{57}	—	December 1, 2014	Haleakala	Pan-STARRS 1	·	1.4 km	MPC · JPL
784138	2014 XB_{58}	—	December 11, 2014	Mount Lemmon	Mount Lemmon Survey	KOR	1.1 km	MPC · JPL
784139	2014 XD_{58}	—	December 15, 2014	Mount Lemmon	Mount Lemmon Survey	KOR	1.1 km	MPC · JPL
784140	2014 YH_{23}	—	December 21, 2014	Haleakala	Pan-STARRS 1	·	1.5 km	MPC · JPL
784141	2014 YT_{27}	—	December 24, 2014	Mount Lemmon	Mount Lemmon Survey	AGN	910 m	MPC · JPL
784142	2014 YZ_{29}	—	December 24, 2014	Mount Lemmon	Mount Lemmon Survey	EOS	1.4 km	MPC · JPL
784143	2014 YZ_{50}	—	December 27, 2014	Catalina	CSS	H	440 m	MPC · JPL
784144	2014 YV_{52}	—	December 21, 2014	Haleakala	Pan-STARRS 1	·	1.6 km	MPC · JPL
784145	2014 YQ_{55}	—	December 16, 2014	Haleakala	Pan-STARRS 1	·	1.9 km	MPC · JPL
784146	2014 YA_{57}	—	December 26, 2014	Haleakala	Pan-STARRS 1	·	1.4 km	MPC · JPL
784147	2014 YZ_{57}	—	March 1, 2011	Sandlot	G. Hug	·	1.5 km	MPC · JPL
784148	2014 YK_{59}	—	December 10, 2005	Kitt Peak	Spacewatch	·	970 m	MPC · JPL
784149	2014 YR_{61}	—	December 26, 2014	Haleakala	Pan-STARRS 1	EOS	1.1 km	MPC · JPL
784150	2014 YO_{63}	—	November 9, 2013	Haleakala	Pan-STARRS 1	·	2.4 km	MPC · JPL
784151	2014 YP_{64}	—	November 17, 2014	Haleakala	Pan-STARRS 1	·	1.5 km	MPC · JPL
784152	2014 YB_{71}	—	December 21, 2014	Haleakala	Pan-STARRS 1	·	1.4 km	MPC · JPL
784153	2014 YD_{71}	—	December 29, 2014	Haleakala	Pan-STARRS 1	·	1.6 km	MPC · JPL
784154	2014 YA_{74}	—	December 26, 2014	Haleakala	Pan-STARRS 1	·	1.5 km	MPC · JPL
784155	2014 YE_{76}	—	December 23, 2014	Mount Lemmon	Mount Lemmon Survey	·	1.4 km	MPC · JPL
784156	2014 YL_{76}	—	December 29, 2014	Haleakala	Pan-STARRS 1	·	2.3 km	MPC · JPL
784157	2014 YQ_{76}	—	December 29, 2014	Haleakala	Pan-STARRS 1	EOS	1.3 km	MPC · JPL
784158	2014 YF_{77}	—	December 21, 2014	Haleakala	Pan-STARRS 1	·	1.1 km	MPC · JPL
784159	2014 YG_{77}	—	December 28, 2014	Mount Lemmon	Mount Lemmon Survey	·	1.2 km	MPC · JPL
784160	2014 YO_{77}	—	December 18, 2014	Haleakala	Pan-STARRS 1	·	1.9 km	MPC · JPL
784161	2014 YB_{78}	—	December 29, 2014	Haleakala	Pan-STARRS 1	·	1.5 km	MPC · JPL
784162	2014 YE_{78}	—	December 16, 2014	Haleakala	Pan-STARRS 1	·	1.3 km	MPC · JPL
784163	2014 YF_{79}	—	December 27, 2014	Haleakala	Pan-STARRS 1	TIR	2.1 km	MPC · JPL
784164	2014 YQ_{80}	—	December 29, 2014	Mount Lemmon	Mount Lemmon Survey	·	1.4 km	MPC · JPL
784165	2014 YY_{80}	—	December 21, 2014	Haleakala	Pan-STARRS 1	·	1.2 km	MPC · JPL
784166	2014 YE_{82}	—	December 16, 2014	Haleakala	Pan-STARRS 1	·	1.4 km	MPC · JPL
784167	2014 YG_{82}	—	December 29, 2014	Haleakala	Pan-STARRS 1	·	1.3 km	MPC · JPL
784168	2014 YB_{83}	—	December 24, 2014	Mount Lemmon	Mount Lemmon Survey	·	2.2 km	MPC · JPL
784169	2014 YM_{83}	—	December 29, 2014	Haleakala	Pan-STARRS 1	·	2.2 km	MPC · JPL
784170	2014 YD_{87}	—	December 16, 2014	Haleakala	Pan-STARRS 1	·	1.5 km	MPC · JPL
784171	2014 YQ_{87}	—	December 21, 2014	Haleakala	Pan-STARRS 1	·	2.3 km	MPC · JPL
784172	2014 YJ_{88}	—	November 11, 2009	Kitt Peak	Spacewatch	KOR	1.0 km	MPC · JPL
784173	2014 YS_{88}	—	December 21, 2014	Haleakala	Pan-STARRS 1	·	1.3 km	MPC · JPL
784174	2014 YO_{93}	—	December 29, 2014	Haleakala	Pan-STARRS 1	·	1.6 km	MPC · JPL
784175	2014 YT_{93}	—	December 30, 2014	Haleakala	Pan-STARRS 1	·	910 m	MPC · JPL
784176	2014 YL_{96}	—	December 24, 2014	Mount Lemmon	Mount Lemmon Survey	·	1.4 km	MPC · JPL
784177	2014 YV_{98}	—	December 21, 2014	Haleakala	Pan-STARRS 1	·	1.2 km	MPC · JPL
784178	2014 YG_{99}	—	December 29, 2014	Mount Lemmon	Mount Lemmon Survey	·	1.5 km	MPC · JPL
784179	2014 YG_{100}	—	December 26, 2014	Haleakala	Pan-STARRS 1	·	2.5 km	MPC · JPL
784180	2014 YM_{100}	—	December 21, 2014	Haleakala	Pan-STARRS 1	KOR	910 m	MPC · JPL
784181	2014 YO_{103}	—	November 18, 2008	Kitt Peak	Spacewatch	·	1.9 km	MPC · JPL
784182	2014 YR_{103}	—	December 21, 2014	Haleakala	Pan-STARRS 1	·	1.6 km	MPC · JPL
784183	2015 AU	—	October 30, 2014	Haleakala	Pan-STARRS 1	·	1.0 km	MPC · JPL
784184	2015 AW_{8}	—	November 26, 2014	Haleakala	Pan-STARRS 1	·	1.6 km	MPC · JPL
784185	2015 AQ_{9}	—	April 1, 2011	Mount Lemmon	Mount Lemmon Survey	·	1.4 km	MPC · JPL
784186	2015 AO_{13}	—	October 27, 2008	Kitt Peak	Spacewatch	·	2.1 km	MPC · JPL
784187	2015 AE_{17}	—	October 2, 2014	Haleakala	Pan-STARRS 1	·	1.5 km	MPC · JPL
784188	2015 AY_{19}	—	November 20, 2014	Haleakala	Pan-STARRS 1	HNS	800 m	MPC · JPL
784189	2015 AP_{20}	—	September 4, 2014	Haleakala	Pan-STARRS 1	·	1.6 km	MPC · JPL
784190	2015 AL_{21}	—	December 17, 2009	Mount Lemmon	Mount Lemmon Survey	·	1.9 km	MPC · JPL
784191	2015 AP_{24}	—	January 12, 2015	Haleakala	Pan-STARRS 1	·	1.5 km	MPC · JPL
784192	2015 AY_{33}	—	January 13, 2015	Haleakala	Pan-STARRS 1	·	1.2 km	MPC · JPL
784193	2015 AF_{36}	—	December 21, 2014	Haleakala	Pan-STARRS 1	KOR	1.0 km	MPC · JPL
784194	2015 AU_{36}	—	September 1, 2013	Haleakala	Pan-STARRS 1	·	1.3 km	MPC · JPL
784195	2015 AN_{37}	—	December 21, 2014	Haleakala	Pan-STARRS 1	·	2.1 km	MPC · JPL
784196	2015 AA_{38}	—	December 21, 2014	Haleakala	Pan-STARRS 1	·	1.6 km	MPC · JPL
784197	2015 AE_{41}	—	January 13, 2015	Haleakala	Pan-STARRS 1	·	1.3 km	MPC · JPL
784198	2015 AF_{43}	—	December 21, 2014	Haleakala	Pan-STARRS 1	·	1.3 km	MPC · JPL
784199	2015 AQ_{45}	—	January 14, 2015	Haleakala	Pan-STARRS 1	AMO · slow	180 m	MPC · JPL
784200	2015 AB_{51}	—	January 13, 2015	Haleakala	Pan-STARRS 1	AGN	780 m	MPC · JPL

== 784201–784300 ==
back to top

Designation			Discovery			Properties		Ref
Permanent	Provisional	Named after	Date	Site	Discoverer(s)	Category	Diam.	Ref
784201	2015 AR_{55}	—	November 17, 2009	Mount Lemmon	Mount Lemmon Survey	·	1.3 km	MPC · JPL
784202	2015 AE_{58}	—	September 6, 2008	Mount Lemmon	Mount Lemmon Survey	·	1.3 km	MPC · JPL
784203	2015 AG_{59}	—	January 13, 2015	Haleakala	Pan-STARRS 1	·	1.3 km	MPC · JPL
784204	2015 AM_{62}	—	September 15, 2013	Mount Lemmon	Mount Lemmon Survey	·	1.4 km	MPC · JPL
784205	2015 AP_{62}	—	September 21, 2009	Mount Lemmon	Mount Lemmon Survey	AGN	900 m	MPC · JPL
784206	2015 AS_{62}	—	January 13, 2015	Haleakala	Pan-STARRS 1	·	1.3 km	MPC · JPL
784207	2015 AT_{62}	—	January 13, 2015	Haleakala	Pan-STARRS 1	·	1.4 km	MPC · JPL
784208	2015 AT_{65}	—	January 13, 2015	Haleakala	Pan-STARRS 1	·	1.7 km	MPC · JPL
784209	2015 AV_{66}	—	January 13, 2015	Haleakala	Pan-STARRS 1	·	1.6 km	MPC · JPL
784210	2015 AG_{68}	—	December 4, 2008	Kitt Peak	Spacewatch	·	1.8 km	MPC · JPL
784211	2015 AO_{71}	—	December 21, 2014	Haleakala	Pan-STARRS 1	·	1.8 km	MPC · JPL
784212	2015 AG_{74}	—	February 2, 2006	Kitt Peak	Spacewatch	·	1.4 km	MPC · JPL
784213	2015 AN_{76}	—	December 21, 2014	Haleakala	Pan-STARRS 1	HOF	1.7 km	MPC · JPL
784214	2015 AJ_{79}	—	January 13, 2015	Haleakala	Pan-STARRS 1	·	1.4 km	MPC · JPL
784215	2015 AJ_{80}	—	January 13, 2015	Haleakala	Pan-STARRS 1	·	2.4 km	MPC · JPL
784216	2015 AU_{80}	—	December 21, 2014	Haleakala	Pan-STARRS 1	·	1.4 km	MPC · JPL
784217	2015 AP_{81}	—	August 26, 2013	Haleakala	Pan-STARRS 1	·	1.1 km	MPC · JPL
784218	2015 AT_{81}	—	December 21, 2014	Haleakala	Pan-STARRS 1	·	1.3 km	MPC · JPL
784219	2015 AR_{82}	—	January 13, 2015	Haleakala	Pan-STARRS 1	·	2.0 km	MPC · JPL
784220	2015 AZ_{83}	—	October 31, 2014	Haleakala	Pan-STARRS 1	·	1.5 km	MPC · JPL
784221	2015 AT_{84}	—	December 21, 2014	Haleakala	Pan-STARRS 1	AGN	870 m	MPC · JPL
784222	2015 AA_{85}	—	December 21, 2014	Haleakala	Pan-STARRS 1	·	2.3 km	MPC · JPL
784223	2015 AC_{92}	—	January 13, 2015	Haleakala	Pan-STARRS 1	·	1.1 km	MPC · JPL
784224	2015 AD_{95}	—	April 20, 2012	Kitt Peak	Spacewatch	EUN	920 m	MPC · JPL
784225	2015 AG_{98}	—	December 21, 2014	Haleakala	Pan-STARRS 1	·	1.3 km	MPC · JPL
784226	2015 AY_{99}	—	September 4, 2013	Mount Lemmon	Mount Lemmon Survey	KOR	1.1 km	MPC · JPL
784227	2015 AN_{105}	—	September 19, 2001	Kitt Peak	Spacewatch	·	690 m	MPC · JPL
784228	2015 AG_{109}	—	August 23, 2004	Kitt Peak	Spacewatch	·	1.3 km	MPC · JPL
784229	2015 AO_{109}	—	December 21, 2014	Haleakala	Pan-STARRS 1	·	1.5 km	MPC · JPL
784230	2015 AQ_{109}	—	January 14, 2015	Haleakala	Pan-STARRS 1	·	2.2 km	MPC · JPL
784231	2015 AN_{113}	—	January 14, 2015	Haleakala	Pan-STARRS 1	HOF	1.8 km	MPC · JPL
784232	2015 AO_{114}	—	January 14, 2015	Haleakala	Pan-STARRS 1	·	1.4 km	MPC · JPL
784233	2015 AD_{117}	—	January 14, 2015	Haleakala	Pan-STARRS 1	·	1.0 km	MPC · JPL
784234	2015 AX_{118}	—	November 8, 2013	Mount Lemmon	Mount Lemmon Survey	·	1.1 km	MPC · JPL
784235	2015 AG_{120}	—	January 14, 2015	Haleakala	Pan-STARRS 1	·	1.3 km	MPC · JPL
784236	2015 AJ_{125}	—	January 14, 2015	Haleakala	Pan-STARRS 1	PAD	1.1 km	MPC · JPL
784237	2015 AS_{125}	—	January 14, 2015	Haleakala	Pan-STARRS 1	KOR	990 m	MPC · JPL
784238	2015 AX_{125}	—	December 21, 2014	Haleakala	Pan-STARRS 1	EOS	1.2 km	MPC · JPL
784239	2015 AV_{127}	—	January 14, 2015	Haleakala	Pan-STARRS 1	·	920 m	MPC · JPL
784240	2015 AQ_{129}	—	December 21, 2014	Haleakala	Pan-STARRS 1	·	1.4 km	MPC · JPL
784241	2015 AS_{129}	—	January 14, 2015	Haleakala	Pan-STARRS 1	·	1.4 km	MPC · JPL
784242	2015 AE_{131}	—	December 1, 2005	Kitt Peak	Wasserman, L. H., Millis, R. L.	·	1.3 km	MPC · JPL
784243	2015 AF_{132}	—	September 14, 2013	Haleakala	Pan-STARRS 1	·	1.4 km	MPC · JPL
784244	2015 AH_{132}	—	January 14, 2015	Haleakala	Pan-STARRS 1	KOR	900 m	MPC · JPL
784245	2015 AL_{133}	—	January 14, 2015	Haleakala	Pan-STARRS 1	EOS	1.4 km	MPC · JPL
784246	2015 AQ_{137}	—	December 21, 2014	Mount Lemmon	Mount Lemmon Survey	·	1.5 km	MPC · JPL
784247	2015 AW_{139}	—	September 25, 2013	Mount Lemmon	Mount Lemmon Survey	·	990 m	MPC · JPL
784248	2015 AB_{143}	—	December 21, 2014	Haleakala	Pan-STARRS 1	·	1.7 km	MPC · JPL
784249	2015 AE_{143}	—	January 14, 2015	Haleakala	Pan-STARRS 1	·	1.8 km	MPC · JPL
784250	2015 AJ_{143}	—	January 14, 2015	Haleakala	Pan-STARRS 1	·	1.1 km	MPC · JPL
784251	2015 AL_{143}	—	April 5, 2011	Mount Lemmon	Mount Lemmon Survey	KOR	840 m	MPC · JPL
784252	2015 AR_{144}	—	October 24, 2013	Mount Lemmon	Mount Lemmon Survey	KOR	920 m	MPC · JPL
784253	2015 AZ_{148}	—	December 21, 2014	Haleakala	Pan-STARRS 1	·	1.9 km	MPC · JPL
784254	2015 AJ_{152}	—	August 17, 2012	Haleakala	Pan-STARRS 1	·	1.8 km	MPC · JPL
784255	2015 AE_{153}	—	August 14, 2013	Haleakala	Pan-STARRS 1	·	1.6 km	MPC · JPL
784256	2015 AW_{153}	—	September 3, 2013	Mount Lemmon	Mount Lemmon Survey	·	1.2 km	MPC · JPL
784257	2015 AY_{155}	—	January 14, 2015	Haleakala	Pan-STARRS 1	·	1.6 km	MPC · JPL
784258	2015 AD_{161}	—	March 4, 2005	Mount Lemmon	Mount Lemmon Survey	·	1.3 km	MPC · JPL
784259	2015 AR_{163}	—	December 21, 2014	Mount Lemmon	Mount Lemmon Survey	DOR	2.0 km	MPC · JPL
784260	2015 AS_{173}	—	January 14, 2015	Haleakala	Pan-STARRS 1	·	2.3 km	MPC · JPL
784261	2015 AW_{173}	—	January 14, 2015	Haleakala	Pan-STARRS 1	·	1.3 km	MPC · JPL
784262	2015 AF_{174}	—	September 15, 2013	Haleakala	Pan-STARRS 1	·	1.5 km	MPC · JPL
784263	2015 AA_{181}	—	January 14, 2015	Haleakala	Pan-STARRS 1	·	1.2 km	MPC · JPL
784264	2015 AN_{181}	—	January 14, 2015	Haleakala	Pan-STARRS 1	·	1.3 km	MPC · JPL
784265	2015 AB_{187}	—	September 12, 2007	Mount Lemmon	Mount Lemmon Survey	·	2.1 km	MPC · JPL
784266	2015 AG_{196}	—	January 14, 2015	Haleakala	Pan-STARRS 1	KOR	980 m	MPC · JPL
784267	2015 AZ_{198}	—	August 15, 2013	Haleakala	Pan-STARRS 1	·	1.3 km	MPC · JPL
784268	2015 AH_{200}	—	August 15, 2013	Haleakala	Pan-STARRS 1	·	1.6 km	MPC · JPL
784269	2015 AQ_{211}	—	February 28, 2011	La Sagra	OAM	·	1.6 km	MPC · JPL
784270	2015 AG_{215}	—	September 29, 2008	Kitt Peak	Spacewatch	·	2.0 km	MPC · JPL
784271	2015 AX_{216}	—	January 15, 2015	Haleakala	Pan-STARRS 1	(5651)	2.0 km	MPC · JPL
784272	2015 AS_{217}	—	January 15, 2015	Haleakala	Pan-STARRS 1	·	1.4 km	MPC · JPL
784273	2015 AB_{219}	—	August 15, 2013	Haleakala	Pan-STARRS 1	·	1.6 km	MPC · JPL
784274	2015 AX_{222}	—	January 15, 2015	Haleakala	Pan-STARRS 1	·	1.5 km	MPC · JPL
784275	2015 AZ_{223}	—	January 15, 2015	Haleakala	Pan-STARRS 1	·	1.3 km	MPC · JPL
784276	2015 AJ_{224}	—	January 15, 2015	Haleakala	Pan-STARRS 1	·	1.9 km	MPC · JPL
784277	2015 AK_{224}	—	October 10, 2008	Mount Lemmon	Mount Lemmon Survey	·	1.1 km	MPC · JPL
784278	2015 AO_{224}	—	November 11, 2009	Kitt Peak	Spacewatch	EUN	980 m	MPC · JPL
784279	2015 AM_{227}	—	January 15, 2015	Haleakala	Pan-STARRS 1	·	1.1 km	MPC · JPL
784280	2015 AE_{228}	—	December 29, 2014	Mount Lemmon	Mount Lemmon Survey	·	1.8 km	MPC · JPL
784281	2015 AN_{230}	—	September 2, 2007	Mount Lemmon	Mount Lemmon Survey	EOS	1.4 km	MPC · JPL
784282	2015 AG_{236}	—	January 15, 2015	Haleakala	Pan-STARRS 1	·	2.5 km	MPC · JPL
784283	2015 AP_{236}	—	January 15, 2015	Haleakala	Pan-STARRS 1	·	1.9 km	MPC · JPL
784284	2015 AB_{238}	—	January 15, 2015	Haleakala	Pan-STARRS 1	·	1.3 km	MPC · JPL
784285	2015 AC_{238}	—	October 12, 2013	Kitt Peak	Spacewatch	·	2.0 km	MPC · JPL
784286	2015 AE_{240}	—	February 17, 2004	Kitt Peak	Spacewatch	EOS	1.6 km	MPC · JPL
784287	2015 AJ_{247}	—	March 14, 2010	Mount Lemmon	Mount Lemmon Survey	THM	1.9 km	MPC · JPL
784288	2015 AT_{252}	—	September 14, 2013	Haleakala	Pan-STARRS 1	·	1.5 km	MPC · JPL
784289	2015 AH_{253}	—	January 14, 2015	Haleakala	Pan-STARRS 1	EOS	1.1 km	MPC · JPL
784290	2015 AL_{254}	—	October 1, 2008	Mount Lemmon	Mount Lemmon Survey	·	1.3 km	MPC · JPL
784291	2015 AJ_{257}	—	January 15, 2015	Mount Lemmon	Mount Lemmon Survey	·	1.1 km	MPC · JPL
784292	2015 AK_{258}	—	December 21, 2014	Haleakala	Pan-STARRS 1	·	1.3 km	MPC · JPL
784293	2015 AH_{261}	—	January 15, 2015	Haleakala	Pan-STARRS 1	VER	1.9 km	MPC · JPL
784294	2015 AJ_{267}	—	January 13, 2015	Haleakala	Pan-STARRS 1	AST	1.2 km	MPC · JPL
784295	2015 AL_{269}	—	January 13, 2015	Haleakala	Pan-STARRS 1	·	2.5 km	MPC · JPL
784296	2015 AF_{271}	—	January 13, 2015	Haleakala	Pan-STARRS 1	KOR	920 m	MPC · JPL
784297	2015 AX_{272}	—	April 13, 2011	Kitt Peak	Spacewatch	KOR	1.1 km	MPC · JPL
784298	2015 AZ_{272}	—	January 13, 2015	Haleakala	Pan-STARRS 1	KOR	960 m	MPC · JPL
784299	2015 AL_{280}	—	January 15, 2015	Mount Lemmon	Mount Lemmon Survey	EOS	1.4 km	MPC · JPL
784300	2015 AE_{289}	—	October 15, 2013	Mount Lemmon	Mount Lemmon Survey	·	2.5 km	MPC · JPL

== 784301–784400 ==
back to top

Designation			Discovery			Properties		Ref
Permanent	Provisional	Named after	Date	Site	Discoverer(s)	Category	Diam.	Ref
784301	2015 AM_{289}	—	January 13, 2015	Haleakala	Pan-STARRS 1	·	1.0 km	MPC · JPL
784302	2015 AH_{298}	—	January 14, 2015	Haleakala	Pan-STARRS 1	·	1.6 km	MPC · JPL
784303	2015 AR_{298}	—	January 14, 2015	Haleakala	Pan-STARRS 1	·	1.4 km	MPC · JPL
784304	2015 AZ_{298}	—	January 14, 2015	Haleakala	Pan-STARRS 1	HNS	860 m	MPC · JPL
784305	2015 AA_{299}	—	January 15, 2015	Haleakala	Pan-STARRS 1	·	2.1 km	MPC · JPL
784306	2015 AB_{299}	—	January 15, 2015	Haleakala	Pan-STARRS 1	EOS	1.2 km	MPC · JPL
784307	2015 AG_{300}	—	January 11, 2015	Haleakala	Pan-STARRS 1	·	2.1 km	MPC · JPL
784308	2015 AK_{301}	—	November 8, 2013	Catalina	CSS	EUP	3.3 km	MPC · JPL
784309	2015 AL_{301}	—	January 13, 2015	Haleakala	Pan-STARRS 1	·	2.2 km	MPC · JPL
784310	2015 AZ_{304}	—	January 14, 2015	Haleakala	Pan-STARRS 1	EOS	1.4 km	MPC · JPL
784311	2015 AF_{306}	—	January 14, 2015	Haleakala	Pan-STARRS 1	·	2.3 km	MPC · JPL
784312	2015 AH_{306}	—	January 13, 2015	Haleakala	Pan-STARRS 1	·	1.4 km	MPC · JPL
784313	2015 BD_{9}	—	October 1, 2013	Mount Lemmon	Mount Lemmon Survey	·	1.2 km	MPC · JPL
784314	2015 BL_{9}	—	December 21, 2014	Haleakala	Pan-STARRS 1	EOS	1.3 km	MPC · JPL
784315	2015 BL_{10}	—	April 30, 2011	Mount Lemmon	Mount Lemmon Survey	·	1.3 km	MPC · JPL
784316	2015 BV_{11}	—	August 4, 2013	Haleakala	Pan-STARRS 1	·	1.8 km	MPC · JPL
784317	2015 BN_{16}	—	January 16, 2015	Mount Lemmon	Mount Lemmon Survey	·	2.2 km	MPC · JPL
784318	2015 BQ_{16}	—	December 21, 2014	Mount Lemmon	Mount Lemmon Survey	·	1.5 km	MPC · JPL
784319	2015 BC_{19}	—	December 26, 2014	Haleakala	Pan-STARRS 1	·	1.4 km	MPC · JPL
784320	2015 BV_{19}	—	July 15, 2013	Haleakala	Pan-STARRS 1	·	1.4 km	MPC · JPL
784321	2015 BK_{20}	—	March 10, 2011	Kitt Peak	Spacewatch	·	1.0 km	MPC · JPL
784322	2015 BR_{29}	—	January 16, 2015	Haleakala	Pan-STARRS 1	BRA	1.1 km	MPC · JPL
784323	2015 BP_{30}	—	January 16, 2015	Haleakala	Pan-STARRS 1	·	1.2 km	MPC · JPL
784324	2015 BT_{33}	—	September 10, 2007	Mount Lemmon	Mount Lemmon Survey	·	1.5 km	MPC · JPL
784325	2015 BW_{38}	—	January 17, 2015	Mount Lemmon	Mount Lemmon Survey	EOS	1.4 km	MPC · JPL
784326	2015 BG_{39}	—	December 29, 2014	Haleakala	Pan-STARRS 1	·	1.9 km	MPC · JPL
784327	2015 BG_{41}	—	December 29, 2014	Haleakala	Pan-STARRS 1	·	1.4 km	MPC · JPL
784328	2015 BO_{43}	—	December 26, 2014	Haleakala	Pan-STARRS 1	·	1.7 km	MPC · JPL
784329	2015 BZ_{45}	—	January 17, 2015	Mount Lemmon	Mount Lemmon Survey	·	1.4 km	MPC · JPL
784330	2015 BN_{49}	—	November 16, 2009	Mount Lemmon	Mount Lemmon Survey	·	1.3 km	MPC · JPL
784331	2015 BQ_{54}	—	December 29, 2014	Oukaïmeden	M. Ory	·	2.6 km	MPC · JPL
784332	2015 BB_{58}	—	January 17, 2015	Haleakala	Pan-STARRS 1	·	1.5 km	MPC · JPL
784333	2015 BN_{68}	—	November 1, 2008	Kitt Peak	Spacewatch	·	1.5 km	MPC · JPL
784334	2015 BD_{73}	—	January 17, 2015	Haleakala	Pan-STARRS 1	·	1.9 km	MPC · JPL
784335	2015 BW_{77}	—	January 17, 2015	Haleakala	Pan-STARRS 1	EOS	1.2 km	MPC · JPL
784336	2015 BS_{84}	—	December 11, 2009	Mount Lemmon	Mount Lemmon Survey	·	1.4 km	MPC · JPL
784337	2015 BE_{85}	—	November 29, 2014	Haleakala	Pan-STARRS 1	·	1.3 km	MPC · JPL
784338	2015 BB_{95}	—	January 16, 2015	Haleakala	Pan-STARRS 1	KOR	1.0 km	MPC · JPL
784339	2015 BQ_{98}	—	January 16, 2015	Mount Lemmon	Mount Lemmon Survey	·	1.4 km	MPC · JPL
784340	2015 BZ_{110}	—	January 17, 2015	Mount Lemmon	Mount Lemmon Survey	·	1.1 km	MPC · JPL
784341	2015 BC_{113}	—	September 12, 2013	Mount Lemmon	Mount Lemmon Survey	·	1.3 km	MPC · JPL
784342	2015 BD_{113}	—	January 17, 2015	Mount Lemmon	Mount Lemmon Survey	·	1.5 km	MPC · JPL
784343	2015 BQ_{114}	—	January 17, 2015	Mount Lemmon	Mount Lemmon Survey	·	1.2 km	MPC · JPL
784344	2015 BP_{121}	—	August 9, 2013	Kitt Peak	Spacewatch	·	800 m	MPC · JPL
784345	2015 BB_{122}	—	January 17, 2015	Haleakala	Pan-STARRS 1	·	2.0 km	MPC · JPL
784346	2015 BL_{122}	—	January 17, 2015	Haleakala	Pan-STARRS 1	·	1.2 km	MPC · JPL
784347	2015 BP_{123}	—	May 21, 2012	Mount Lemmon	Mount Lemmon Survey	·	2.0 km	MPC · JPL
784348	2015 BS_{123}	—	October 23, 2013	Mount Lemmon	Mount Lemmon Survey	KOR	850 m	MPC · JPL
784349	2015 BN_{124}	—	October 26, 2013	Mount Lemmon	Mount Lemmon Survey	·	1.9 km	MPC · JPL
784350	2015 BX_{127}	—	February 27, 2006	Kitt Peak	Spacewatch	·	1.2 km	MPC · JPL
784351	2015 BD_{129}	—	October 1, 2008	Mount Lemmon	Mount Lemmon Survey	·	1.4 km	MPC · JPL
784352	2015 BB_{131}	—	January 17, 2015	Haleakala	Pan-STARRS 1	·	1.6 km	MPC · JPL
784353	2015 BU_{133}	—	January 17, 2015	Haleakala	Pan-STARRS 1	·	2.0 km	MPC · JPL
784354	2015 BY_{133}	—	January 17, 2015	Haleakala	Pan-STARRS 1	PAD	1.4 km	MPC · JPL
784355	2015 BD_{135}	—	January 17, 2015	Haleakala	Pan-STARRS 1	·	1.2 km	MPC · JPL
784356	2015 BL_{139}	—	January 17, 2015	Haleakala	Pan-STARRS 1	·	1.3 km	MPC · JPL
784357	2015 BP_{141}	—	January 17, 2015	Haleakala	Pan-STARRS 1	·	1.6 km	MPC · JPL
784358	2015 BW_{141}	—	October 24, 2013	Mount Lemmon	Mount Lemmon Survey	·	1.5 km	MPC · JPL
784359	2015 BX_{151}	—	November 2, 2013	Kitt Peak	Spacewatch	·	1.7 km	MPC · JPL
784360	2015 BU_{153}	—	January 17, 2015	Haleakala	Pan-STARRS 1	·	2.1 km	MPC · JPL
784361	2015 BY_{153}	—	January 17, 2015	Haleakala	Pan-STARRS 1	·	1.3 km	MPC · JPL
784362	2015 BK_{155}	—	January 17, 2015	Haleakala	Pan-STARRS 1	·	2.1 km	MPC · JPL
784363	2015 BR_{155}	—	October 2, 2013	Haleakala	Pan-STARRS 1	·	1.3 km	MPC · JPL
784364	2015 BW_{155}	—	September 7, 2008	Mount Lemmon	Mount Lemmon Survey	·	1.4 km	MPC · JPL
784365	2015 BE_{159}	—	January 17, 2015	Haleakala	Pan-STARRS 1	·	810 m	MPC · JPL
784366	2015 BC_{160}	—	January 17, 2015	Haleakala	Pan-STARRS 1	·	1.5 km	MPC · JPL
784367	2015 BX_{160}	—	November 9, 2013	Mount Lemmon	Mount Lemmon Survey	·	1.8 km	MPC · JPL
784368	2015 BZ_{160}	—	October 12, 2013	Kitt Peak	Spacewatch	·	1.4 km	MPC · JPL
784369	2015 BQ_{161}	—	October 4, 1999	Kitt Peak	Spacewatch	AGN	800 m	MPC · JPL
784370	2015 BV_{163}	—	October 23, 2013	Mount Lemmon	Mount Lemmon Survey	·	1.2 km	MPC · JPL
784371	2015 BX_{165}	—	January 17, 2015	Haleakala	Pan-STARRS 1	DOR	1.9 km	MPC · JPL
784372	2015 BF_{166}	—	January 17, 2015	Haleakala	Pan-STARRS 1	·	1.3 km	MPC · JPL
784373	2015 BM_{169}	—	September 22, 2009	Mount Lemmon	Mount Lemmon Survey	·	690 m	MPC · JPL
784374	2015 BY_{173}	—	January 7, 2010	Kitt Peak	Spacewatch	·	1.4 km	MPC · JPL
784375	2015 BK_{174}	—	November 3, 2008	Kitt Peak	Spacewatch	TEL	820 m	MPC · JPL
784376	2015 BR_{174}	—	October 5, 2013	Haleakala	Pan-STARRS 1	KOR	950 m	MPC · JPL
784377	2015 BJ_{176}	—	January 17, 2015	Haleakala	Pan-STARRS 1	LIX	2.6 km	MPC · JPL
784378	2015 BU_{178}	—	January 17, 2015	Haleakala	Pan-STARRS 1	·	1.9 km	MPC · JPL
784379	2015 BN_{179}	—	January 17, 2015	Haleakala	Pan-STARRS 1	EOS	1.1 km	MPC · JPL
784380	2015 BY_{182}	—	November 9, 2013	Mount Lemmon	Mount Lemmon Survey	·	1.4 km	MPC · JPL
784381	2015 BS_{183}	—	April 30, 2011	Haleakala	Pan-STARRS 1	·	1.5 km	MPC · JPL
784382	2015 BH_{187}	—	January 17, 2015	Haleakala	Pan-STARRS 1	KOR	1.0 km	MPC · JPL
784383	2015 BA_{189}	—	November 19, 2008	Kitt Peak	Spacewatch	·	1.6 km	MPC · JPL
784384	2015 BO_{190}	—	September 3, 2008	Kitt Peak	Spacewatch	·	1.6 km	MPC · JPL
784385	2015 BX_{191}	—	October 3, 2013	Haleakala	Pan-STARRS 1	HOF	1.8 km	MPC · JPL
784386	2015 BA_{194}	—	November 25, 2013	Haleakala	Pan-STARRS 1	·	1.4 km	MPC · JPL
784387	2015 BX_{194}	—	October 7, 2008	Mount Lemmon	Mount Lemmon Survey	·	1.6 km	MPC · JPL
784388	2015 BN_{198}	—	January 17, 2015	Haleakala	Pan-STARRS 1	·	1.2 km	MPC · JPL
784389	2015 BA_{216}	—	January 18, 2015	Mount Lemmon	Mount Lemmon Survey	·	2.1 km	MPC · JPL
784390	2015 BF_{216}	—	September 14, 2013	Haleakala	Pan-STARRS 1	·	2.0 km	MPC · JPL
784391	2015 BE_{218}	—	December 26, 2014	Haleakala	Pan-STARRS 1	EOS	1.4 km	MPC · JPL
784392	2015 BD_{227}	—	September 23, 2008	Mount Lemmon	Mount Lemmon Survey	·	1.3 km	MPC · JPL
784393	2015 BT_{227}	—	January 18, 2015	Haleakala	Pan-STARRS 1	·	1.4 km	MPC · JPL
784394	2015 BA_{231}	—	January 18, 2015	Mount Lemmon	Mount Lemmon Survey	·	1.5 km	MPC · JPL
784395	2015 BV_{231}	—	December 29, 2014	Haleakala	Pan-STARRS 1	·	1.1 km	MPC · JPL
784396	2015 BA_{232}	—	December 21, 2014	Haleakala	Pan-STARRS 1	·	1.3 km	MPC · JPL
784397	2015 BR_{237}	—	February 17, 2010	Kitt Peak	Spacewatch	·	2.1 km	MPC · JPL
784398	2015 BZ_{239}	—	January 18, 2015	Mount Lemmon	Mount Lemmon Survey	·	1.5 km	MPC · JPL
784399	2015 BA_{241}	—	January 18, 2015	Haleakala	Pan-STARRS 1	EOS	1.3 km	MPC · JPL
784400	2015 BJ_{241}	—	January 18, 2015	Haleakala	Pan-STARRS 1	·	1.4 km	MPC · JPL

== 784401–784500 ==
back to top

Designation			Discovery			Properties		Ref
Permanent	Provisional	Named after	Date	Site	Discoverer(s)	Category	Diam.	Ref
784401	2015 BS_{246}	—	December 30, 2008	Mount Lemmon	Mount Lemmon Survey	·	2.2 km	MPC · JPL
784402	2015 BV_{247}	—	January 18, 2015	Haleakala	Pan-STARRS 1	KOR	1.1 km	MPC · JPL
784403	2015 BZ_{251}	—	October 5, 2005	Mount Lemmon	Mount Lemmon Survey	·	680 m	MPC · JPL
784404	2015 BK_{257}	—	January 18, 2015	Haleakala	Pan-STARRS 1	·	2.4 km	MPC · JPL
784405	2015 BF_{258}	—	October 2, 2008	Kitt Peak	Spacewatch	·	1.1 km	MPC · JPL
784406	2015 BA_{260}	—	August 14, 2013	Haleakala	Pan-STARRS 1	·	1.2 km	MPC · JPL
784407	2015 BB_{267}	—	March 27, 2003	Kitt Peak	Spacewatch	·	1.2 km	MPC · JPL
784408	2015 BH_{273}	—	February 8, 2011	Mount Lemmon	Mount Lemmon Survey	·	1.1 km	MPC · JPL
784409	2015 BJ_{275}	—	January 8, 2011	Mount Lemmon	Mount Lemmon Survey	EUN	720 m	MPC · JPL
784410	2015 BT_{275}	—	January 19, 2015	Mount Lemmon	Mount Lemmon Survey	·	1.3 km	MPC · JPL
784411	2015 BG_{277}	—	January 19, 2015	Mount Lemmon	Mount Lemmon Survey	·	1.5 km	MPC · JPL
784412	2015 BS_{282}	—	January 19, 2015	Haleakala	Pan-STARRS 1	DOR	1.6 km	MPC · JPL
784413	2015 BU_{282}	—	October 5, 2013	Haleakala	Pan-STARRS 1	EOS	1.2 km	MPC · JPL
784414	2015 BC_{284}	—	January 19, 2015	Haleakala	Pan-STARRS 1	EOS	1.4 km	MPC · JPL
784415	2015 BM_{284}	—	January 19, 2015	Haleakala	Pan-STARRS 1	·	2.4 km	MPC · JPL
784416	2015 BB_{285}	—	January 19, 2015	Haleakala	Pan-STARRS 1	·	1.7 km	MPC · JPL
784417	2015 BE_{287}	—	January 19, 2015	Haleakala	Pan-STARRS 1	·	1.5 km	MPC · JPL
784418	2015 BZ_{287}	—	January 19, 2015	Haleakala	Pan-STARRS 1	·	2.0 km	MPC · JPL
784419	2015 BP_{288}	—	January 19, 2015	Haleakala	Pan-STARRS 1	·	2.1 km	MPC · JPL
784420	2015 BW_{288}	—	October 2, 2013	Mount Lemmon	Mount Lemmon Survey	EOS	1.2 km	MPC · JPL
784421	2015 BX_{288}	—	January 19, 2015	Haleakala	Pan-STARRS 1	·	2.1 km	MPC · JPL
784422	2015 BQ_{293}	—	September 12, 2007	Mount Lemmon	Mount Lemmon Survey	·	2.0 km	MPC · JPL
784423	2015 BW_{294}	—	January 19, 2015	Haleakala	Pan-STARRS 1	·	2.1 km	MPC · JPL
784424	2015 BY_{302}	—	January 19, 2015	Haleakala	Pan-STARRS 1	EOS	1.5 km	MPC · JPL
784425	2015 BX_{307}	—	January 20, 2015	Mount Lemmon	Mount Lemmon Survey	·	1.1 km	MPC · JPL
784426	2015 BE_{309}	—	January 20, 2015	Haleakala	Pan-STARRS 1	·	1.3 km	MPC · JPL
784427	2015 BG_{318}	—	October 3, 2013	Haleakala	Pan-STARRS 1	·	1.9 km	MPC · JPL
784428	2015 BU_{318}	—	January 17, 2015	Haleakala	Pan-STARRS 1	TEL	870 m	MPC · JPL
784429	2015 BH_{320}	—	January 17, 2015	Haleakala	Pan-STARRS 1	·	1.2 km	MPC · JPL
784430	2015 BY_{320}	—	January 17, 2015	Haleakala	Pan-STARRS 1	·	1.3 km	MPC · JPL
784431	2015 BH_{322}	—	January 17, 2015	Haleakala	Pan-STARRS 1	AGN	950 m	MPC · JPL
784432	2015 BS_{323}	—	January 17, 2015	Haleakala	Pan-STARRS 1	·	1.3 km	MPC · JPL
784433	2015 BL_{329}	—	September 15, 2013	Haleakala	Pan-STARRS 1	·	1.4 km	MPC · JPL
784434	2015 BP_{335}	—	January 17, 2015	Haleakala	Pan-STARRS 1	·	1.6 km	MPC · JPL
784435	2015 BQ_{336}	—	October 6, 2008	Mount Lemmon	Mount Lemmon Survey	·	1.4 km	MPC · JPL
784436	2015 BE_{338}	—	January 17, 2015	Haleakala	Pan-STARRS 1	·	2.4 km	MPC · JPL
784437	2015 BQ_{341}	—	November 9, 2013	Mount Lemmon	Mount Lemmon Survey	NEM	1.9 km	MPC · JPL
784438	2015 BN_{343}	—	September 14, 2013	Haleakala	Pan-STARRS 1	·	1.2 km	MPC · JPL
784439	2015 BO_{343}	—	September 3, 2013	Calar Alto	F. Hormuth	THM	1.5 km	MPC · JPL
784440	2015 BG_{347}	—	October 15, 2009	Mount Lemmon	Mount Lemmon Survey	·	980 m	MPC · JPL
784441	2015 BH_{350}	—	September 4, 2007	Mount Lemmon	Mount Lemmon Survey	EOS	1.5 km	MPC · JPL
784442	2015 BJ_{351}	—	January 13, 2015	Haleakala	Pan-STARRS 1	·	1.4 km	MPC · JPL
784443	2015 BS_{359}	—	December 26, 2014	Haleakala	Pan-STARRS 1	·	1.9 km	MPC · JPL
784444	2015 BM_{364}	—	January 20, 2015	Haleakala	Pan-STARRS 1	EOS	1.4 km	MPC · JPL
784445	2015 BT_{366}	—	December 29, 2014	Haleakala	Pan-STARRS 1	GEF	830 m	MPC · JPL
784446	2015 BN_{369}	—	January 20, 2015	Haleakala	Pan-STARRS 1	NEM	1.6 km	MPC · JPL
784447	2015 BZ_{373}	—	January 20, 2015	Haleakala	Pan-STARRS 1	·	1.8 km	MPC · JPL
784448	2015 BF_{374}	—	January 20, 2015	Haleakala	Pan-STARRS 1	·	1.7 km	MPC · JPL
784449	2015 BR_{379}	—	September 29, 2008	Mount Lemmon	Mount Lemmon Survey	·	1.4 km	MPC · JPL
784450	2015 BJ_{382}	—	January 20, 2015	Haleakala	Pan-STARRS 1	LIX	2.6 km	MPC · JPL
784451	2015 BF_{384}	—	November 8, 2013	Mount Lemmon	Mount Lemmon Survey	·	1.5 km	MPC · JPL
784452	2015 BX_{386}	—	October 5, 2013	Haleakala	Pan-STARRS 1	·	1.4 km	MPC · JPL
784453	2015 BQ_{392}	—	January 20, 2015	Haleakala	Pan-STARRS 1	·	1.1 km	MPC · JPL
784454	2015 BS_{392}	—	January 20, 2015	Haleakala	Pan-STARRS 1	EOS	1.1 km	MPC · JPL
784455	2015 BV_{395}	—	January 20, 2015	Haleakala	Pan-STARRS 1	VER	1.8 km	MPC · JPL
784456	2015 BZ_{399}	—	January 20, 2015	Haleakala	Pan-STARRS 1	·	2.2 km	MPC · JPL
784457	2015 BU_{400}	—	January 20, 2015	Haleakala	Pan-STARRS 1	·	1.2 km	MPC · JPL
784458	2015 BQ_{401}	—	January 20, 2015	Haleakala	Pan-STARRS 1	·	1.1 km	MPC · JPL
784459	2015 BS_{402}	—	January 17, 2015	Haleakala	Pan-STARRS 1	VER	1.9 km	MPC · JPL
784460	2015 BR_{410}	—	January 20, 2015	Haleakala	Pan-STARRS 1	·	1.1 km	MPC · JPL
784461	2015 BR_{412}	—	November 17, 2008	Kitt Peak	Spacewatch	·	1.5 km	MPC · JPL
784462	2015 BC_{413}	—	April 15, 2011	Haleakala	Pan-STARRS 1	KOR	1.0 km	MPC · JPL
784463	2015 BF_{414}	—	January 20, 2015	Haleakala	Pan-STARRS 1	·	1.8 km	MPC · JPL
784464	2015 BL_{416}	—	November 8, 2013	Mount Lemmon	Mount Lemmon Survey	KOR	920 m	MPC · JPL
784465	2015 BU_{424}	—	January 20, 2015	Haleakala	Pan-STARRS 1	·	1.6 km	MPC · JPL
784466	2015 BX_{424}	—	September 17, 2012	Mount Lemmon	Mount Lemmon Survey	·	1.5 km	MPC · JPL
784467	2015 BG_{428}	—	January 20, 2015	Haleakala	Pan-STARRS 1	·	1.1 km	MPC · JPL
784468	2015 BJ_{430}	—	January 20, 2015	Haleakala	Pan-STARRS 1	VER	2.1 km	MPC · JPL
784469	2015 BD_{431}	—	August 21, 2012	Haleakala	Pan-STARRS 1	EUN	730 m	MPC · JPL
784470	2015 BO_{441}	—	January 20, 2015	Haleakala	Pan-STARRS 1	·	1.4 km	MPC · JPL
784471	2015 BY_{442}	—	January 20, 2015	Haleakala	Pan-STARRS 1	·	2.9 km	MPC · JPL
784472	2015 BB_{443}	—	January 20, 2015	Haleakala	Pan-STARRS 1	THM	1.7 km	MPC · JPL
784473	2015 BD_{443}	—	February 3, 2009	Mount Lemmon	Mount Lemmon Survey	·	3.3 km	MPC · JPL
784474	2015 BW_{444}	—	January 20, 2015	Haleakala	Pan-STARRS 1	·	1.8 km	MPC · JPL
784475	2015 BR_{446}	—	November 9, 2013	Mount Lemmon	Mount Lemmon Survey	·	1.4 km	MPC · JPL
784476	2015 BY_{447}	—	October 9, 2007	Mount Lemmon	Mount Lemmon Survey	·	2.1 km	MPC · JPL
784477	2015 BP_{450}	—	January 20, 2015	Haleakala	Pan-STARRS 1	EOS	1.2 km	MPC · JPL
784478	2015 BX_{451}	—	January 20, 2015	Haleakala	Pan-STARRS 1	·	1.5 km	MPC · JPL
784479	2015 BG_{453}	—	January 20, 2015	Haleakala	Pan-STARRS 1	·	1.7 km	MPC · JPL
784480	2015 BN_{454}	—	January 20, 2015	Haleakala	Pan-STARRS 1	·	1.3 km	MPC · JPL
784481	2015 BE_{461}	—	January 20, 2015	Haleakala	Pan-STARRS 1	·	1.5 km	MPC · JPL
784482	2015 BF_{461}	—	October 27, 2008	Mount Lemmon	Mount Lemmon Survey	·	1.1 km	MPC · JPL
784483	2015 BW_{461}	—	September 6, 2008	Kitt Peak	Spacewatch	·	820 m	MPC · JPL
784484	2015 BN_{462}	—	January 31, 2006	Kitt Peak	Spacewatch	·	1.2 km	MPC · JPL
784485	2015 BF_{470}	—	October 5, 2013	Haleakala	Pan-STARRS 1	·	1.2 km	MPC · JPL
784486	2015 BG_{471}	—	January 20, 2015	Haleakala	Pan-STARRS 1	·	1.2 km	MPC · JPL
784487	2015 BU_{471}	—	October 8, 2008	Kitt Peak	Spacewatch	·	1.3 km	MPC · JPL
784488	2015 BE_{474}	—	January 20, 2015	Haleakala	Pan-STARRS 1	KOR	930 m	MPC · JPL
784489	2015 BN_{475}	—	January 20, 2015	Haleakala	Pan-STARRS 1	·	1.8 km	MPC · JPL
784490	2015 BE_{479}	—	January 20, 2015	Haleakala	Pan-STARRS 1	·	1.2 km	MPC · JPL
784491	2015 BL_{480}	—	January 20, 2015	Haleakala	Pan-STARRS 1	·	2.3 km	MPC · JPL
784492	2015 BG_{482}	—	February 11, 2011	Mount Lemmon	Mount Lemmon Survey	·	980 m	MPC · JPL
784493	2015 BY_{483}	—	November 4, 2013	Mount Lemmon	Mount Lemmon Survey	·	2.1 km	MPC · JPL
784494	2015 BD_{488}	—	November 19, 2008	Kitt Peak	Spacewatch	·	1.2 km	MPC · JPL
784495	2015 BP_{489}	—	January 20, 2015	Haleakala	Pan-STARRS 1	AGN	910 m	MPC · JPL
784496	2015 BA_{490}	—	January 20, 2015	Haleakala	Pan-STARRS 1	·	1.3 km	MPC · JPL
784497	2015 BS_{490}	—	February 9, 2010	Kitt Peak	Spacewatch	·	1.2 km	MPC · JPL
784498	2015 BW_{493}	—	January 20, 2015	Haleakala	Pan-STARRS 1	·	1.7 km	MPC · JPL
784499	2015 BP_{495}	—	January 20, 2015	Haleakala	Pan-STARRS 1	KOR	1.0 km	MPC · JPL
784500	2015 BX_{499}	—	October 24, 2013	Mount Lemmon	Mount Lemmon Survey	(12739)	1.1 km	MPC · JPL

== 784501–784600 ==
back to top

Designation			Discovery			Properties		Ref
Permanent	Provisional	Named after	Date	Site	Discoverer(s)	Category	Diam.	Ref
784501	2015 BN_{504}	—	January 20, 2015	Haleakala	Pan-STARRS 1	·	1.3 km	MPC · JPL
784502	2015 BA_{505}	—	January 20, 2015	Haleakala	Pan-STARRS 1	·	1.5 km	MPC · JPL
784503	2015 BW_{506}	—	October 23, 2013	Mount Lemmon	Mount Lemmon Survey	THM	1.7 km	MPC · JPL
784504	2015 BJ_{508}	—	November 9, 2013	Mount Lemmon	Mount Lemmon Survey	·	1.6 km	MPC · JPL
784505	2015 BK_{508}	—	January 20, 2015	Haleakala	Pan-STARRS 1	AGN	870 m	MPC · JPL
784506	2015 BQ_{516}	—	January 20, 2015	Haleakala	Pan-STARRS 1	·	1.1 km	MPC · JPL
784507	2015 BV_{531}	—	January 23, 2015	Haleakala	Pan-STARRS 1	·	1.1 km	MPC · JPL
784508	2015 BJ_{532}	—	January 23, 2015	Haleakala	Pan-STARRS 1	·	1.9 km	MPC · JPL
784509	2015 BM_{532}	—	May 8, 2010	Mount Lemmon	Mount Lemmon Survey	·	1.1 km	MPC · JPL
784510	2015 BL_{533}	—	January 29, 2015	Haleakala	Pan-STARRS 1	·	2.4 km	MPC · JPL
784511	2015 BM_{534}	—	January 21, 2015	Haleakala	Pan-STARRS 1	·	1.9 km	MPC · JPL
784512	2015 BS_{534}	—	October 5, 2013	Mount Lemmon	Mount Lemmon Survey	·	1.2 km	MPC · JPL
784513	2015 BQ_{536}	—	October 26, 2013	Mount Lemmon	Mount Lemmon Survey	KOR	1.0 km	MPC · JPL
784514	2015 BO_{539}	—	January 20, 2015	Haleakala	Pan-STARRS 1	URS	2.3 km	MPC · JPL
784515	2015 BP_{540}	—	January 23, 2015	Haleakala	Pan-STARRS 1	·	1.7 km	MPC · JPL
784516	2015 BP_{541}	—	November 26, 2013	Mount Lemmon	Mount Lemmon Survey	·	2.2 km	MPC · JPL
784517	2015 BS_{543}	—	October 24, 2013	Mount Lemmon	Mount Lemmon Survey	KOR	1.0 km	MPC · JPL
784518	2015 BC_{552}	—	December 29, 2014	Haleakala	Pan-STARRS 1	·	2.6 km	MPC · JPL
784519	2015 BT_{555}	—	January 17, 2015	Mount Lemmon	Mount Lemmon Survey	·	1.9 km	MPC · JPL
784520	2015 BT_{556}	—	January 17, 2015	Haleakala	Pan-STARRS 1	·	1.8 km	MPC · JPL
784521	2015 BV_{557}	—	January 17, 2015	Haleakala	Pan-STARRS 1	·	1.3 km	MPC · JPL
784522	2015 BT_{570}	—	July 1, 2005	Kitt Peak	Spacewatch	·	2.1 km	MPC · JPL
784523	2015 BV_{570}	—	February 24, 2015	Haleakala	Pan-STARRS 1	·	2.3 km	MPC · JPL
784524	2015 BC_{578}	—	July 26, 2017	Haleakala	Pan-STARRS 1	EOS	1.3 km	MPC · JPL
784525	2015 BN_{578}	—	January 28, 2015	Haleakala	Pan-STARRS 1	·	2.1 km	MPC · JPL
784526	2015 BB_{585}	—	January 21, 2015	Haleakala	Pan-STARRS 1	·	1.6 km	MPC · JPL
784527	2015 BB_{590}	—	January 21, 2015	Haleakala	Pan-STARRS 1	·	1.3 km	MPC · JPL
784528	2015 BF_{590}	—	January 22, 2015	Haleakala	Pan-STARRS 1	·	2.3 km	MPC · JPL
784529	2015 BB_{591}	—	January 20, 2015	Haleakala	Pan-STARRS 1	NAE	1.6 km	MPC · JPL
784530	2015 BP_{592}	—	January 19, 2015	Haleakala	Pan-STARRS 1	·	1.7 km	MPC · JPL
784531	2015 BP_{593}	—	January 20, 2015	Haleakala	Pan-STARRS 1	·	940 m	MPC · JPL
784532	2015 BR_{594}	—	January 19, 2015	Mount Lemmon	Mount Lemmon Survey	·	2.3 km	MPC · JPL
784533	2015 BK_{595}	—	January 16, 2015	Haleakala	Pan-STARRS 1	·	2.3 km	MPC · JPL
784534	2015 BQ_{595}	—	January 21, 2015	Mount Lemmon	Mount Lemmon Survey	EOS	1.5 km	MPC · JPL
784535	2015 BD_{596}	—	January 28, 2015	Haleakala	Pan-STARRS 1	VER	2.1 km	MPC · JPL
784536	2015 BA_{597}	—	January 27, 2015	Haleakala	Pan-STARRS 1	·	1.7 km	MPC · JPL
784537	2015 BM_{597}	—	January 28, 2015	Haleakala	Pan-STARRS 1	·	2.6 km	MPC · JPL
784538	2015 BB_{599}	—	January 21, 2015	Haleakala	Pan-STARRS 1	·	1.5 km	MPC · JPL
784539	2015 BL_{600}	—	January 23, 2015	Haleakala	Pan-STARRS 1	·	1.5 km	MPC · JPL
784540	2015 BV_{600}	—	January 29, 2015	Haleakala	Pan-STARRS 1	·	1.1 km	MPC · JPL
784541	2015 BY_{600}	—	January 23, 2015	Haleakala	Pan-STARRS 1	THM	1.9 km	MPC · JPL
784542	2015 BD_{601}	—	January 22, 2015	Haleakala	Pan-STARRS 1	·	1.3 km	MPC · JPL
784543	2015 BE_{601}	—	January 28, 2015	Haleakala	Pan-STARRS 1	VER	2.0 km	MPC · JPL
784544	2015 BH_{601}	—	January 21, 2015	Haleakala	Pan-STARRS 1	·	1.3 km	MPC · JPL
784545	2015 BL_{601}	—	January 20, 2015	Haleakala	Pan-STARRS 1	·	1.7 km	MPC · JPL
784546	2015 BA_{602}	—	January 21, 2015	Haleakala	Pan-STARRS 1	·	1.4 km	MPC · JPL
784547	2015 BS_{602}	—	January 29, 2015	Haleakala	Pan-STARRS 1	BRA	1.0 km	MPC · JPL
784548	2015 BM_{603}	—	January 17, 2015	Haleakala	Pan-STARRS 1	·	1.0 km	MPC · JPL
784549	2015 BM_{607}	—	January 28, 2015	Haleakala	Pan-STARRS 1	L4	5.9 km	MPC · JPL
784550	2015 BC_{608}	—	January 27, 2015	Haleakala	Pan-STARRS 1	EOS	1.3 km	MPC · JPL
784551	2015 BM_{609}	—	January 20, 2015	Haleakala	Pan-STARRS 1	·	2.0 km	MPC · JPL
784552	2015 BP_{612}	—	January 16, 2015	Haleakala	Pan-STARRS 1	·	1.2 km	MPC · JPL
784553	2015 BB_{613}	—	January 22, 2015	Haleakala	Pan-STARRS 1	·	2.3 km	MPC · JPL
784554	2015 BC_{613}	—	January 22, 2015	Haleakala	Pan-STARRS 1	·	1.4 km	MPC · JPL
784555	2015 BJ_{613}	—	January 18, 2015	Mount Lemmon	Mount Lemmon Survey	·	1.3 km	MPC · JPL
784556	2015 BO_{613}	—	January 27, 2015	Haleakala	Pan-STARRS 1	·	1.4 km	MPC · JPL
784557	2015 BU_{613}	—	January 18, 2015	Mount Lemmon	Mount Lemmon Survey	·	1.3 km	MPC · JPL
784558	2015 BZ_{615}	—	January 28, 2015	Haleakala	Pan-STARRS 1	·	1.9 km	MPC · JPL
784559	2015 BD_{616}	—	January 20, 2015	Mount Lemmon	Mount Lemmon Survey	·	2.1 km	MPC · JPL
784560	2015 BW_{617}	—	January 17, 2015	Haleakala	Pan-STARRS 1	·	1.5 km	MPC · JPL
784561	2015 BG_{618}	—	January 20, 2015	Haleakala	Pan-STARRS 1	·	1.0 km	MPC · JPL
784562	2015 BN_{618}	—	January 20, 2015	Haleakala	Pan-STARRS 1	·	1.7 km	MPC · JPL
784563	2015 BO_{618}	—	January 26, 2015	Haleakala	Pan-STARRS 1	EOS	1.2 km	MPC · JPL
784564	2015 CA_{2}	—	January 22, 2015	Haleakala	Pan-STARRS 1	·	1.0 km	MPC · JPL
784565	2015 CL_{7}	—	February 8, 2015	Mount Lemmon	Mount Lemmon Survey	·	2.5 km	MPC · JPL
784566	2015 CZ_{14}	—	January 17, 2015	Haleakala	Pan-STARRS 1	BRA	1.2 km	MPC · JPL
784567	2015 CB_{25}	—	February 10, 2015	Mount Lemmon	Mount Lemmon Survey	·	850 m	MPC · JPL
784568	2015 CE_{26}	—	January 29, 2015	Haleakala	Pan-STARRS 1	·	1.8 km	MPC · JPL
784569	2015 CT_{28}	—	November 8, 2013	Mount Lemmon	Mount Lemmon Survey	·	1.7 km	MPC · JPL
784570	2015 CL_{31}	—	February 11, 2015	Haleakala	Pan-STARRS 1	·	1.4 km	MPC · JPL
784571	2015 CO_{35}	—	February 25, 2006	Mount Lemmon	Mount Lemmon Survey	·	1.5 km	MPC · JPL
784572	2015 CD_{56}	—	March 18, 2010	Kitt Peak	Spacewatch	·	1.5 km	MPC · JPL
784573	2015 CF_{64}	—	January 20, 2015	Haleakala	Pan-STARRS 1	·	1.2 km	MPC · JPL
784574	2015 CX_{64}	—	January 22, 2015	Haleakala	Pan-STARRS 1	·	1.8 km	MPC · JPL
784575	2015 CC_{69}	—	January 17, 2015	Haleakala	Pan-STARRS 1	·	1.1 km	MPC · JPL
784576	2015 CF_{69}	—	February 12, 2015	Haleakala	Pan-STARRS 1	·	1.6 km	MPC · JPL
784577	2015 CT_{69}	—	September 24, 2013	Kitt Peak	Spacewatch	·	1.6 km	MPC · JPL
784578	2015 CU_{73}	—	February 11, 2015	Mount Lemmon	Mount Lemmon Survey	·	2.3 km	MPC · JPL
784579	2015 CK_{74}	—	February 15, 2015	Haleakala	Pan-STARRS 1	·	1.6 km	MPC · JPL
784580	2015 CS_{75}	—	February 13, 2015	Haleakala	Pan-STARRS 1	·	1.7 km	MPC · JPL
784581	2015 CX_{76}	—	February 13, 2015	Mount Lemmon	Mount Lemmon Survey	·	2.3 km	MPC · JPL
784582	2015 CY_{76}	—	February 15, 2015	Haleakala	Pan-STARRS 1	·	2.2 km	MPC · JPL
784583	2015 CB_{81}	—	February 11, 2015	Mount Lemmon	Mount Lemmon Survey	·	1.7 km	MPC · JPL
784584	2015 CC_{81}	—	February 13, 2015	Mount Lemmon	Mount Lemmon Survey	·	1.5 km	MPC · JPL
784585	2015 CK_{83}	—	January 26, 2015	Haleakala	Pan-STARRS 1	·	1.2 km	MPC · JPL
784586	2015 DF_{3}	—	December 21, 2014	Haleakala	Pan-STARRS 1	THM	1.6 km	MPC · JPL
784587	2015 DL_{3}	—	September 5, 2013	Kitt Peak	Spacewatch	·	1.4 km	MPC · JPL
784588	2015 DL_{13}	—	October 5, 2013	Haleakala	Pan-STARRS 1	·	1.2 km	MPC · JPL
784589	2015 DQ_{15}	—	January 14, 2015	Haleakala	Pan-STARRS 1	THM	1.6 km	MPC · JPL
784590	2015 DF_{17}	—	February 16, 2015	Haleakala	Pan-STARRS 1	·	1.5 km	MPC · JPL
784591	2015 DZ_{20}	—	February 16, 2015	Haleakala	Pan-STARRS 1	·	2.3 km	MPC · JPL
784592	2015 DA_{24}	—	January 29, 2015	Haleakala	Pan-STARRS 1	·	2.1 km	MPC · JPL
784593	2015 DR_{24}	—	January 21, 2015	Haleakala	Pan-STARRS 1	·	1.4 km	MPC · JPL
784594	2015 DS_{26}	—	October 25, 2013	Kitt Peak	Spacewatch	·	1.4 km	MPC · JPL
784595	2015 DA_{30}	—	January 27, 2015	Haleakala	Pan-STARRS 1	·	1.9 km	MPC · JPL
784596	2015 DV_{33}	—	October 8, 2012	Haleakala	Pan-STARRS 1	·	2.0 km	MPC · JPL
784597	2015 DC_{55}	—	October 26, 2013	Mount Lemmon	Mount Lemmon Survey	KOR	880 m	MPC · JPL
784598	2015 DE_{55}	—	September 14, 2013	Haleakala	Pan-STARRS 1	·	1.3 km	MPC · JPL
784599	2015 DE_{57}	—	February 16, 2015	Haleakala	Pan-STARRS 1	·	1.2 km	MPC · JPL
784600	2015 DZ_{57}	—	January 22, 2015	Haleakala	Pan-STARRS 1	·	1.1 km	MPC · JPL

== 784601–784700 ==
back to top

Designation			Discovery			Properties		Ref
Permanent	Provisional	Named after	Date	Site	Discoverer(s)	Category	Diam.	Ref
784601	2015 DN_{60}	—	February 1, 2015	Haleakala	Pan-STARRS 1	·	2.6 km	MPC · JPL
784602	2015 DX_{60}	—	January 22, 2015	Haleakala	Pan-STARRS 1	·	1.3 km	MPC · JPL
784603	2015 DO_{67}	—	October 24, 2013	Mount Lemmon	Mount Lemmon Survey	·	1.0 km	MPC · JPL
784604	2015 DU_{72}	—	January 16, 2015	Haleakala	Pan-STARRS 1	·	2.3 km	MPC · JPL
784605	2015 DT_{73}	—	January 22, 2015	Haleakala	Pan-STARRS 1	·	1.4 km	MPC · JPL
784606	2015 DM_{74}	—	February 16, 2015	Haleakala	Pan-STARRS 1	KOR	970 m	MPC · JPL
784607	2015 DY_{79}	—	January 20, 2015	Haleakala	Pan-STARRS 1	·	1.4 km	MPC · JPL
784608	2015 DS_{80}	—	February 16, 2015	Haleakala	Pan-STARRS 1	EOS	1.2 km	MPC · JPL
784609	2015 DG_{82}	—	October 28, 2008	Mount Lemmon	Mount Lemmon Survey	KOR	990 m	MPC · JPL
784610	2015 DH_{84}	—	February 10, 2015	Mount Lemmon	Mount Lemmon Survey	THM	1.6 km	MPC · JPL
784611	2015 DS_{85}	—	February 16, 2015	Haleakala	Pan-STARRS 1	·	1.3 km	MPC · JPL
784612	2015 DT_{87}	—	November 9, 2013	Mount Lemmon	Mount Lemmon Survey	THM	1.9 km	MPC · JPL
784613	2015 DV_{87}	—	January 20, 2015	Haleakala	Pan-STARRS 1	EOS	1.2 km	MPC · JPL
784614	2015 DV_{88}	—	October 18, 2007	Mount Lemmon	Mount Lemmon Survey	THM	1.9 km	MPC · JPL
784615	2015 DK_{91}	—	February 16, 2015	Haleakala	Pan-STARRS 1	·	2.0 km	MPC · JPL
784616	2015 DH_{93}	—	February 16, 2015	Haleakala	Pan-STARRS 1	·	1.1 km	MPC · JPL
784617	2015 DL_{93}	—	February 26, 2011	Mount Lemmon	Mount Lemmon Survey	·	900 m	MPC · JPL
784618	2015 DZ_{94}	—	March 26, 2003	Kitt Peak	Spacewatch	·	1.0 km	MPC · JPL
784619	2015 DL_{96}	—	September 24, 2012	Kitt Peak	Spacewatch	·	1.8 km	MPC · JPL
784620	2015 DC_{101}	—	October 24, 2013	Mount Lemmon	Mount Lemmon Survey	HOF	2.2 km	MPC · JPL
784621	2015 DH_{101}	—	November 12, 2013	Mount Lemmon	Mount Lemmon Survey	·	1.2 km	MPC · JPL
784622	2015 DF_{106}	—	January 20, 2015	Haleakala	Pan-STARRS 1	·	1.3 km	MPC · JPL
784623	2015 DA_{128}	—	February 17, 2015	Haleakala	Pan-STARRS 1	·	1.6 km	MPC · JPL
784624	2015 DW_{139}	—	February 9, 2015	Mount Lemmon	Mount Lemmon Survey	·	1.3 km	MPC · JPL
784625	2015 DX_{140}	—	January 18, 2015	Mount Lemmon	Mount Lemmon Survey	EUN	1.1 km	MPC · JPL
784626	2015 DS_{144}	—	January 24, 2015	Haleakala	Pan-STARRS 1	·	2.2 km	MPC · JPL
784627	2015 DX_{144}	—	November 23, 2014	Haleakala	Pan-STARRS 1	EUN	780 m	MPC · JPL
784628	2015 DY_{149}	—	January 8, 2010	Kitt Peak	Spacewatch	·	1.5 km	MPC · JPL
784629	2015 DA_{151}	—	January 21, 2015	Haleakala	Pan-STARRS 1	·	2.4 km	MPC · JPL
784630	2015 DR_{151}	—	February 18, 2015	Mount Lemmon	Mount Lemmon Survey	·	1.5 km	MPC · JPL
784631	2015 DH_{159}	—	February 18, 2015	Mount Lemmon	Mount Lemmon Survey	EOS	1.4 km	MPC · JPL
784632	2015 DQ_{165}	—	February 18, 2015	Haleakala	Pan-STARRS 1	T_{j} (2.96) · 3:2	4.3 km	MPC · JPL
784633	2015 DV_{165}	—	October 26, 2013	Mount Lemmon	Mount Lemmon Survey	·	1.3 km	MPC · JPL
784634	2015 DP_{168}	—	February 19, 2015	Mount Lemmon	Mount Lemmon Survey	·	1.8 km	MPC · JPL
784635	2015 DY_{184}	—	February 20, 2015	Haleakala	Pan-STARRS 1	EOS	1.1 km	MPC · JPL
784636	2015 DP_{185}	—	November 27, 2013	Haleakala	Pan-STARRS 1	EOS	1.2 km	MPC · JPL
784637	2015 DT_{187}	—	February 20, 2015	Haleakala	Pan-STARRS 1	EOS	1.5 km	MPC · JPL
784638	2015 DO_{193}	—	October 23, 2009	Mount Lemmon	Mount Lemmon Survey	·	1.2 km	MPC · JPL
784639	2015 DG_{196}	—	January 27, 2015	Haleakala	Pan-STARRS 1	·	1.4 km	MPC · JPL
784640	2015 DL_{197}	—	October 25, 2013	Kitt Peak	Spacewatch	·	1.9 km	MPC · JPL
784641	2015 DW_{201}	—	April 2, 2005	Mount Lemmon	Mount Lemmon Survey	·	1.1 km	MPC · JPL
784642	2015 DX_{202}	—	February 23, 2015	Haleakala	Pan-STARRS 1	·	2.0 km	MPC · JPL
784643	2015 DL_{206}	—	February 23, 2015	Haleakala	Pan-STARRS 1	·	1.2 km	MPC · JPL
784644	2015 DE_{212}	—	January 28, 2015	Haleakala	Pan-STARRS 1	·	2.3 km	MPC · JPL
784645	2015 DG_{217}	—	February 16, 2015	Haleakala	Pan-STARRS 1	·	1.3 km	MPC · JPL
784646	2015 DY_{224}	—	February 17, 2015	Haleakala	Pan-STARRS 1	L4	6.3 km	MPC · JPL
784647	2015 DT_{226}	—	February 16, 2015	Haleakala	Pan-STARRS 1	·	1.3 km	MPC · JPL
784648	2015 DM_{233}	—	February 23, 2015	Haleakala	Pan-STARRS 1	EOS	1.4 km	MPC · JPL
784649	2015 DW_{233}	—	February 16, 2015	Haleakala	Pan-STARRS 1	·	1.6 km	MPC · JPL
784650	2015 DK_{235}	—	January 27, 2015	Haleakala	Pan-STARRS 1	·	1.0 km	MPC · JPL
784651	2015 DM_{235}	—	September 25, 2012	Mount Lemmon	Mount Lemmon Survey	·	2.0 km	MPC · JPL
784652	2015 DP_{235}	—	January 27, 2015	Haleakala	Pan-STARRS 1	·	1.4 km	MPC · JPL
784653	2015 DJ_{236}	—	February 16, 2015	Haleakala	Pan-STARRS 1	·	830 m	MPC · JPL
784654	2015 DL_{237}	—	February 16, 2015	Haleakala	Pan-STARRS 1	·	1.4 km	MPC · JPL
784655	2015 DK_{238}	—	October 17, 2012	Mount Lemmon	Mount Lemmon Survey	·	1.7 km	MPC · JPL
784656	2015 DQ_{238}	—	September 17, 2012	Mount Lemmon	Mount Lemmon Survey	·	1.7 km	MPC · JPL
784657	2015 DT_{238}	—	January 23, 2015	Haleakala	Pan-STARRS 1	·	1.5 km	MPC · JPL
784658	2015 DX_{238}	—	January 21, 2015	Haleakala	Pan-STARRS 1	·	1.5 km	MPC · JPL
784659	2015 DA_{239}	—	February 16, 2015	Haleakala	Pan-STARRS 1	·	1.2 km	MPC · JPL
784660	2015 DA_{240}	—	January 20, 2015	Haleakala	Pan-STARRS 1	·	1.9 km	MPC · JPL
784661	2015 DG_{241}	—	January 24, 2015	Haleakala	Pan-STARRS 1	·	1.9 km	MPC · JPL
784662	2015 DR_{242}	—	November 2, 2013	Mount Lemmon	Mount Lemmon Survey	·	1.3 km	MPC · JPL
784663	2015 DP_{243}	—	January 20, 2015	Haleakala	Pan-STARRS 1	·	2.5 km	MPC · JPL
784664	2015 DB_{244}	—	February 25, 2011	Kitt Peak	Spacewatch	·	850 m	MPC · JPL
784665	2015 DS_{244}	—	November 27, 2013	Haleakala	Pan-STARRS 1	·	2.0 km	MPC · JPL
784666	2015 DM_{247}	—	December 10, 2013	Mount Lemmon	Mount Lemmon Survey	·	1.6 km	MPC · JPL
784667	2015 DA_{248}	—	January 23, 2015	Haleakala	Pan-STARRS 1	·	1.9 km	MPC · JPL
784668	2015 DX_{251}	—	February 16, 2015	Haleakala	Pan-STARRS 1	·	2.0 km	MPC · JPL
784669	2015 DT_{254}	—	February 20, 2015	Haleakala	Pan-STARRS 1	·	1.6 km	MPC · JPL
784670	2015 DU_{261}	—	February 19, 2015	Haleakala	Pan-STARRS 1	·	1.2 km	MPC · JPL
784671	2015 DF_{265}	—	September 13, 2012	Mount Lemmon	Mount Lemmon Survey	·	1.7 km	MPC · JPL
784672	2015 DH_{265}	—	February 18, 2015	Haleakala	Pan-STARRS 1	·	2.2 km	MPC · JPL
784673	2015 DQ_{265}	—	February 25, 2015	Haleakala	Pan-STARRS 1	·	1.7 km	MPC · JPL
784674	2015 DT_{265}	—	February 24, 2015	Haleakala	Pan-STARRS 1	·	1.4 km	MPC · JPL
784675	2015 DF_{266}	—	February 18, 2015	Haleakala	Pan-STARRS 1	EOS	1.3 km	MPC · JPL
784676	2015 DJ_{266}	—	February 16, 2015	Haleakala	Pan-STARRS 1	·	1.4 km	MPC · JPL
784677	2015 DN_{266}	—	February 18, 2015	Haleakala	Pan-STARRS 1	·	2.2 km	MPC · JPL
784678	2015 DX_{266}	—	February 17, 2015	Haleakala	Pan-STARRS 1	EOS	1.2 km	MPC · JPL
784679	2015 DB_{267}	—	February 27, 2015	Haleakala	Pan-STARRS 1	·	1.5 km	MPC · JPL
784680	2015 DF_{267}	—	February 18, 2015	Haleakala	Pan-STARRS 1	·	2.2 km	MPC · JPL
784681	2015 DG_{267}	—	February 24, 2015	Haleakala	Pan-STARRS 1	·	2.0 km	MPC · JPL
784682	2015 DO_{268}	—	February 27, 2015	Haleakala	Pan-STARRS 1	KOR	1.1 km	MPC · JPL
784683	2015 DT_{268}	—	February 17, 2015	Haleakala	Pan-STARRS 1	AGN	1.0 km	MPC · JPL
784684	2015 DA_{269}	—	February 23, 2015	Haleakala	Pan-STARRS 1	·	1.4 km	MPC · JPL
784685	2015 DD_{272}	—	February 19, 2015	Haleakala	Pan-STARRS 1	·	1.0 km	MPC · JPL
784686	2015 DN_{273}	—	February 23, 2015	Haleakala	Pan-STARRS 1	·	1.4 km	MPC · JPL
784687	2015 DQ_{273}	—	February 16, 2015	Haleakala	Pan-STARRS 1	·	2.2 km	MPC · JPL
784688	2015 DG_{274}	—	February 17, 2015	Haleakala	Pan-STARRS 1	·	1.3 km	MPC · JPL
784689	2015 DH_{275}	—	February 16, 2015	Haleakala	Pan-STARRS 1	·	1.5 km	MPC · JPL
784690	2015 DL_{276}	—	February 16, 2015	Haleakala	Pan-STARRS 1	·	1.3 km	MPC · JPL
784691	2015 DC_{277}	—	February 25, 2015	Haleakala	Pan-STARRS 1	AGN	880 m	MPC · JPL
784692	2015 DU_{278}	—	February 24, 2015	Haleakala	Pan-STARRS 1	·	1.4 km	MPC · JPL
784693	2015 DH_{279}	—	February 16, 2015	Haleakala	Pan-STARRS 1	WIT	700 m	MPC · JPL
784694	2015 DU_{279}	—	February 27, 2015	Haleakala	Pan-STARRS 1	HOF	2.0 km	MPC · JPL
784695	2015 DC_{280}	—	February 27, 2015	Haleakala	Pan-STARRS 1	VER	1.7 km	MPC · JPL
784696	2015 DY_{280}	—	February 16, 2015	Haleakala	Pan-STARRS 1	·	1.4 km	MPC · JPL
784697	2015 DM_{282}	—	February 16, 2015	Haleakala	Pan-STARRS 1	THM	1.6 km	MPC · JPL
784698	2015 DE_{284}	—	May 13, 2010	Mount Lemmon	Mount Lemmon Survey	·	1.9 km	MPC · JPL
784699	2015 DV_{284}	—	February 19, 2015	Mount Lemmon	Mount Lemmon Survey	·	2.0 km	MPC · JPL
784700	2015 DH_{285}	—	February 17, 2015	Haleakala	Pan-STARRS 1	·	1.5 km	MPC · JPL

== 784701–784800 ==
back to top

Designation			Discovery			Properties		Ref
Permanent	Provisional	Named after	Date	Site	Discoverer(s)	Category	Diam.	Ref
784701	2015 DS_{285}	—	February 16, 2015	Haleakala	Pan-STARRS 1	·	2.2 km	MPC · JPL
784702	2015 DH_{287}	—	February 16, 2015	Haleakala	Pan-STARRS 1	·	2.3 km	MPC · JPL
784703	2015 DU_{287}	—	February 18, 2015	Haleakala	Pan-STARRS 1	·	2.1 km	MPC · JPL
784704	2015 DW_{287}	—	February 27, 2015	Haleakala	Pan-STARRS 1	·	1.4 km	MPC · JPL
784705	2015 DD_{289}	—	February 24, 2015	Haleakala	Pan-STARRS 1	VER	2.0 km	MPC · JPL
784706	2015 DE_{290}	—	February 20, 2015	Haleakala	Pan-STARRS 1	·	1.5 km	MPC · JPL
784707	2015 DH_{290}	—	February 20, 2015	Haleakala	Pan-STARRS 1	·	2.0 km	MPC · JPL
784708	2015 DA_{291}	—	January 29, 2015	Haleakala	Pan-STARRS 1	·	2.5 km	MPC · JPL
784709	2015 DR_{291}	—	February 16, 2015	Haleakala	Pan-STARRS 1	·	1.5 km	MPC · JPL
784710	2015 DL_{292}	—	February 16, 2015	Haleakala	Pan-STARRS 1	EOS	1.2 km	MPC · JPL
784711	2015 DA_{293}	—	February 16, 2015	Haleakala	Pan-STARRS 1	NEM	1.3 km	MPC · JPL
784712	2015 DN_{294}	—	February 16, 2015	Haleakala	Pan-STARRS 1	·	1.9 km	MPC · JPL
784713	2015 DZ_{295}	—	February 24, 2015	Haleakala	Pan-STARRS 1	·	1.5 km	MPC · JPL
784714	2015 DL_{298}	—	February 16, 2015	Haleakala	Pan-STARRS 1	EOS	1.3 km	MPC · JPL
784715	2015 DK_{302}	—	February 20, 2015	Haleakala	Pan-STARRS 1	·	1.4 km	MPC · JPL
784716	2015 DH_{303}	—	February 20, 2015	Haleakala	Pan-STARRS 1	·	1.6 km	MPC · JPL
784717	2015 DC_{306}	—	February 18, 2015	Haleakala	Pan-STARRS 1	·	1.4 km	MPC · JPL
784718	2015 DT_{306}	—	February 20, 2015	Haleakala	Pan-STARRS 1	·	2.0 km	MPC · JPL
784719	2015 DX_{306}	—	February 16, 2015	Haleakala	Pan-STARRS 1	·	1.3 km	MPC · JPL
784720	2015 DR_{310}	—	August 19, 2006	Kitt Peak	Spacewatch	·	1.7 km	MPC · JPL
784721	2015 DP_{311}	—	February 27, 2015	Haleakala	Pan-STARRS 1	L4 · ERY	6.0 km	MPC · JPL
784722	2015 DN_{313}	—	February 16, 2015	Haleakala	Pan-STARRS 1	·	1.3 km	MPC · JPL
784723	2015 DC_{317}	—	February 17, 2015	Haleakala	Pan-STARRS 1	EOS	1.2 km	MPC · JPL
784724	2015 DG_{317}	—	February 17, 2015	Haleakala	Pan-STARRS 1	EOS	1.2 km	MPC · JPL
784725	2015 DK_{317}	—	February 24, 2015	Haleakala	Pan-STARRS 1	EOS	1.2 km	MPC · JPL
784726	2015 DC_{363}	—	February 16, 2015	Haleakala	Pan-STARRS 1	·	1.6 km	MPC · JPL
784727	2015 DK_{364}	—	February 16, 2015	Haleakala	Pan-STARRS 1	·	1.8 km	MPC · JPL
784728	2015 EB_{4}	—	March 19, 2010	Kitt Peak	Spacewatch	·	1.7 km	MPC · JPL
784729	2015 ET_{8}	—	March 26, 2011	Kitt Peak	Spacewatch	·	1.2 km	MPC · JPL
784730	2015 EW_{10}	—	January 22, 2015	Haleakala	Pan-STARRS 1	·	2.5 km	MPC · JPL
784731	2015 EP_{11}	—	January 17, 2015	Haleakala	Pan-STARRS 1	·	1.5 km	MPC · JPL
784732	2015 EK_{12}	—	January 23, 2015	Haleakala	Pan-STARRS 1	·	2.2 km	MPC · JPL
784733	2015 ER_{18}	—	November 18, 2008	Kitt Peak	Spacewatch	·	1.7 km	MPC · JPL
784734	2015 EX_{25}	—	January 20, 2015	Kitt Peak	Spacewatch	·	1.5 km	MPC · JPL
784735	2015 EJ_{26}	—	February 10, 2015	Mount Lemmon	Mount Lemmon Survey	·	2.2 km	MPC · JPL
784736	2015 EZ_{30}	—	January 27, 2015	Haleakala	Pan-STARRS 1	·	1.1 km	MPC · JPL
784737	2015 EZ_{33}	—	March 14, 2010	Mount Lemmon	Mount Lemmon Survey	·	1.4 km	MPC · JPL
784738	2015 EV_{34}	—	October 9, 2004	Kitt Peak	Spacewatch	AEO	780 m	MPC · JPL
784739	2015 ED_{37}	—	March 4, 2005	Mount Lemmon	Mount Lemmon Survey	·	1.3 km	MPC · JPL
784740	2015 EX_{40}	—	February 13, 2010	Mount Lemmon	Mount Lemmon Survey	·	2.0 km	MPC · JPL
784741	2015 EX_{47}	—	December 26, 2009	Kitt Peak	Spacewatch	·	1.3 km	MPC · JPL
784742	2015 ER_{48}	—	February 25, 2015	Haleakala	Pan-STARRS 1	·	1.6 km	MPC · JPL
784743	2015 EX_{49}	—	February 24, 2015	Haleakala	Pan-STARRS 1	·	1.6 km	MPC · JPL
784744	2015 EG_{51}	—	August 26, 2012	Haleakala	Pan-STARRS 1	·	1.5 km	MPC · JPL
784745	2015 ER_{53}	—	March 14, 2015	Haleakala	Pan-STARRS 1	·	2.1 km	MPC · JPL
784746	2015 ET_{53}	—	November 27, 2009	Mount Lemmon	Mount Lemmon Survey	·	1.2 km	MPC · JPL
784747	2015 EE_{56}	—	February 25, 2015	Haleakala	Pan-STARRS 1	·	1.3 km	MPC · JPL
784748	2015 ED_{67}	—	February 13, 2015	Mount Lemmon	Mount Lemmon Survey	·	1.4 km	MPC · JPL
784749	2015 ED_{73}	—	January 20, 2009	Kitt Peak	Spacewatch	·	2.2 km	MPC · JPL
784750	2015 EC_{75}	—	March 11, 2015	Kitt Peak	Spacewatch	EUN	760 m	MPC · JPL
784751	2015 EM_{77}	—	March 11, 2015	Kitt Peak	Spacewatch	·	1.2 km	MPC · JPL
784752	2015 EU_{77}	—	March 14, 2015	Mount Lemmon	Mount Lemmon Survey	·	1.3 km	MPC · JPL
784753	2015 EF_{80}	—	January 28, 2015	Haleakala	Pan-STARRS 1	·	1.4 km	MPC · JPL
784754	2015 FB_{6}	—	January 19, 2015	Mount Lemmon	Mount Lemmon Survey	EOS	1.6 km	MPC · JPL
784755	2015 FZ_{8}	—	March 16, 2015	Haleakala	Pan-STARRS 1	·	2.4 km	MPC · JPL
784756	2015 FX_{9}	—	April 9, 2010	Mount Lemmon	Mount Lemmon Survey	·	1.3 km	MPC · JPL
784757	2015 FR_{10}	—	November 28, 2013	Mount Lemmon	Mount Lemmon Survey	·	1.8 km	MPC · JPL
784758	2015 FT_{10}	—	March 16, 2015	Haleakala	Pan-STARRS 1	·	930 m	MPC · JPL
784759	2015 FY_{10}	—	February 18, 2015	Haleakala	Pan-STARRS 1	·	1.7 km	MPC · JPL
784760	2015 FO_{12}	—	March 16, 2015	Haleakala	Pan-STARRS 1	EOS	1.4 km	MPC · JPL
784761	2015 FF_{13}	—	May 16, 2005	Mount Lemmon	Mount Lemmon Survey	·	1.3 km	MPC · JPL
784762	2015 FV_{13}	—	March 16, 2015	Haleakala	Pan-STARRS 1	·	1.6 km	MPC · JPL
784763	2015 FY_{14}	—	March 16, 2015	Haleakala	Pan-STARRS 1	L4	6.8 km	MPC · JPL
784764	2015 FK_{15}	—	March 16, 2015	Haleakala	Pan-STARRS 1	·	2.4 km	MPC · JPL
784765	2015 FB_{19}	—	March 16, 2015	Haleakala	Pan-STARRS 1	EOS	1.4 km	MPC · JPL
784766	2015 FE_{19}	—	March 16, 2015	Haleakala	Pan-STARRS 1	EOS	1.5 km	MPC · JPL
784767	2015 FN_{22}	—	March 16, 2015	Haleakala	Pan-STARRS 1	·	2.5 km	MPC · JPL
784768	2015 FW_{22}	—	March 16, 2015	Haleakala	Pan-STARRS 1	·	2.5 km	MPC · JPL
784769	2015 FP_{23}	—	March 16, 2015	Haleakala	Pan-STARRS 1	·	2.0 km	MPC · JPL
784770	2015 FV_{26}	—	February 20, 2015	Haleakala	Pan-STARRS 1	·	2.6 km	MPC · JPL
784771	2015 FC_{28}	—	November 12, 2007	Mount Lemmon	Mount Lemmon Survey	·	2.3 km	MPC · JPL
784772	2015 FW_{28}	—	September 14, 2013	Haleakala	Pan-STARRS 1	·	1.5 km	MPC · JPL
784773	2015 FU_{37}	—	March 17, 2015	Haleakala	Pan-STARRS 1	L4	6.9 km	MPC · JPL
784774	2015 FM_{42}	—	March 17, 2015	Haleakala	Pan-STARRS 1	·	2.3 km	MPC · JPL
784775	2015 FX_{42}	—	March 17, 2015	Haleakala	Pan-STARRS 1	·	2.5 km	MPC · JPL
784776	2015 FF_{43}	—	March 17, 2015	Haleakala	Pan-STARRS 1	EUN	720 m	MPC · JPL
784777	2015 FQ_{43}	—	March 17, 2015	Haleakala	Pan-STARRS 1	·	1.4 km	MPC · JPL
784778	2015 FW_{50}	—	January 20, 2015	Haleakala	Pan-STARRS 1	·	1.2 km	MPC · JPL
784779	2015 FM_{55}	—	January 18, 2015	Haleakala	Pan-STARRS 1	BRA	1.2 km	MPC · JPL
784780	2015 FC_{57}	—	March 18, 2015	Haleakala	Pan-STARRS 1	·	1.7 km	MPC · JPL
784781	2015 FY_{59}	—	February 20, 2015	Haleakala	Pan-STARRS 1	·	2.2 km	MPC · JPL
784782	2015 FJ_{60}	—	January 26, 2015	Haleakala	Pan-STARRS 1	·	1.4 km	MPC · JPL
784783	2015 FO_{60}	—	January 24, 2015	Haleakala	Pan-STARRS 1	·	1.9 km	MPC · JPL
784784	2015 FL_{61}	—	October 3, 2013	Mount Lemmon	Mount Lemmon Survey	TIR	1.5 km	MPC · JPL
784785	2015 FX_{62}	—	April 15, 2007	Kitt Peak	Spacewatch	·	910 m	MPC · JPL
784786	2015 FW_{66}	—	November 28, 2013	Mount Lemmon	Mount Lemmon Survey	·	1.9 km	MPC · JPL
784787	2015 FJ_{67}	—	January 28, 2015	Haleakala	Pan-STARRS 1	·	2.0 km	MPC · JPL
784788	2015 FB_{68}	—	March 18, 2015	Haleakala	Pan-STARRS 1	·	2.0 km	MPC · JPL
784789	2015 FJ_{70}	—	March 18, 2015	Haleakala	Pan-STARRS 1	·	2.7 km	MPC · JPL
784790	2015 FP_{70}	—	March 18, 2015	Haleakala	Pan-STARRS 1	·	870 m	MPC · JPL
784791	2015 FZ_{70}	—	March 18, 2015	Haleakala	Pan-STARRS 1	·	2.1 km	MPC · JPL
784792	2015 FQ_{75}	—	March 17, 2015	Haleakala	Pan-STARRS 1	EUP	2.3 km	MPC · JPL
784793	2015 FK_{80}	—	January 26, 2015	Haleakala	Pan-STARRS 1	·	910 m	MPC · JPL
784794	2015 FA_{81}	—	October 10, 2012	Mount Lemmon	Mount Lemmon Survey	·	2.3 km	MPC · JPL
784795	2015 FK_{89}	—	February 23, 2015	Haleakala	Pan-STARRS 1	·	1.9 km	MPC · JPL
784796	2015 FL_{92}	—	March 20, 2015	Haleakala	Pan-STARRS 1	·	2.0 km	MPC · JPL
784797	2015 FN_{93}	—	March 20, 2015	Haleakala	Pan-STARRS 1	·	2.2 km	MPC · JPL
784798	2015 FC_{95}	—	January 22, 2015	Haleakala	Pan-STARRS 1	·	1.8 km	MPC · JPL
784799	2015 FE_{95}	—	March 20, 2015	Haleakala	Pan-STARRS 1	·	2.1 km	MPC · JPL
784800	2015 FD_{96}	—	March 20, 2015	Haleakala	Pan-STARRS 1	EOS	1.1 km	MPC · JPL

== 784801–784900 ==
back to top

Designation			Discovery			Properties		Ref
Permanent	Provisional	Named after	Date	Site	Discoverer(s)	Category	Diam.	Ref
784801	2015 FA_{98}	—	March 20, 2015	Haleakala	Pan-STARRS 1	EOS	1.2 km	MPC · JPL
784802	2015 FO_{99}	—	September 13, 2007	Kitt Peak	Spacewatch	·	1.8 km	MPC · JPL
784803	2015 FF_{100}	—	January 20, 2015	Haleakala	Pan-STARRS 1	·	1.9 km	MPC · JPL
784804	2015 FM_{100}	—	March 21, 2015	Haleakala	Pan-STARRS 1	·	2.1 km	MPC · JPL
784805	2015 FO_{100}	—	March 21, 2015	Haleakala	Pan-STARRS 1	L4 · ERY	5.9 km	MPC · JPL
784806	2015 FD_{101}	—	January 22, 2015	Haleakala	Pan-STARRS 1	·	760 m	MPC · JPL
784807	2015 FG_{102}	—	March 20, 2015	Haleakala	Pan-STARRS 1	EOS	1.3 km	MPC · JPL
784808	2015 FS_{102}	—	January 3, 2009	Kitt Peak	Spacewatch	·	1.7 km	MPC · JPL
784809	2015 FC_{104}	—	October 21, 2012	Kitt Peak	Spacewatch	·	2.2 km	MPC · JPL
784810	2015 FA_{113}	—	January 20, 2015	Haleakala	Pan-STARRS 1	·	1.6 km	MPC · JPL
784811	2015 FL_{113}	—	March 20, 2015	Haleakala	Pan-STARRS 1	·	2.0 km	MPC · JPL
784812	2015 FA_{114}	—	August 19, 2006	Kitt Peak	Spacewatch	EOS	1.4 km	MPC · JPL
784813	2015 FF_{115}	—	March 20, 2015	Haleakala	Pan-STARRS 1	·	1.8 km	MPC · JPL
784814	2015 FC_{116}	—	March 10, 2005	Mount Lemmon	Mount Lemmon Survey	·	1.7 km	MPC · JPL
784815	2015 FT_{118}	—	May 30, 2011	Mauna Kea	M. Micheli, D. J. Tholen	APO · PHA	260 m	MPC · JPL
784816	2015 FU_{138}	—	October 12, 2007	Kitt Peak	Spacewatch	EOS	1.3 km	MPC · JPL
784817	2015 FK_{139}	—	December 28, 2013	Kitt Peak	Spacewatch	·	1.4 km	MPC · JPL
784818	2015 FA_{140}	—	March 21, 2015	Haleakala	Pan-STARRS 1	·	1.9 km	MPC · JPL
784819	2015 FC_{145}	—	March 21, 2015	Haleakala	Pan-STARRS 1	THM	1.9 km	MPC · JPL
784820	2015 FF_{145}	—	March 17, 2015	Mount Lemmon	Mount Lemmon Survey	EOS	1.5 km	MPC · JPL
784821	2015 FK_{146}	—	March 21, 2015	Haleakala	Pan-STARRS 1	L4 · 006	7.4 km	MPC · JPL
784822	2015 FW_{152}	—	March 21, 2015	Haleakala	Pan-STARRS 1	·	1.2 km	MPC · JPL
784823	2015 FF_{154}	—	November 13, 2010	Mount Lemmon	Mount Lemmon Survey	L4	6.5 km	MPC · JPL
784824	2015 FV_{154}	—	August 29, 2006	Kitt Peak	Spacewatch	EOS	1.3 km	MPC · JPL
784825	2015 FE_{156}	—	April 17, 2010	Kitt Peak	Spacewatch	·	1.6 km	MPC · JPL
784826	2015 FM_{156}	—	April 14, 2004	Kitt Peak	Spacewatch	TIR	2.1 km	MPC · JPL
784827	2015 FU_{156}	—	March 21, 2015	Haleakala	Pan-STARRS 1	L4	7.1 km	MPC · JPL
784828	2015 FS_{159}	—	October 22, 2012	Haleakala	Pan-STARRS 1	EOS	1.4 km	MPC · JPL
784829	2015 FO_{160}	—	March 21, 2015	Haleakala	Pan-STARRS 1	L4	6.3 km	MPC · JPL
784830	2015 FE_{164}	—	April 22, 2007	Kitt Peak	Spacewatch	·	730 m	MPC · JPL
784831	2015 FF_{177}	—	March 22, 2015	Mount Lemmon	Mount Lemmon Survey	·	1.3 km	MPC · JPL
784832	2015 FR_{177}	—	March 22, 2015	Kitt Peak	Spacewatch	·	840 m	MPC · JPL
784833	2015 FG_{179}	—	February 27, 2015	Haleakala	Pan-STARRS 1	·	2.0 km	MPC · JPL
784834	2015 FF_{182}	—	February 18, 2015	Haleakala	Pan-STARRS 1	·	1.8 km	MPC · JPL
784835	2015 FF_{183}	—	February 27, 2015	Haleakala	Pan-STARRS 1	·	1.9 km	MPC · JPL
784836	2015 FS_{187}	—	March 22, 2015	Haleakala	Pan-STARRS 1	AEG	2.2 km	MPC · JPL
784837	2015 FL_{199}	—	March 22, 2015	Haleakala	Pan-STARRS 1	·	2.8 km	MPC · JPL
784838	2015 FG_{204}	—	January 25, 2015	Haleakala	Pan-STARRS 1	·	1.6 km	MPC · JPL
784839	2015 FS_{204}	—	January 23, 2015	Haleakala	Pan-STARRS 1	·	1.6 km	MPC · JPL
784840	2015 FE_{206}	—	February 27, 2015	Haleakala	Pan-STARRS 1	·	1.8 km	MPC · JPL
784841	2015 FX_{206}	—	February 27, 2015	Haleakala	Pan-STARRS 1	·	1.9 km	MPC · JPL
784842	2015 FS_{207}	—	March 17, 2015	Mount Lemmon	Mount Lemmon Survey	·	1.1 km	MPC · JPL
784843	2015 FB_{208}	—	March 17, 2015	Mount Lemmon	Mount Lemmon Survey	·	2.2 km	MPC · JPL
784844	2015 FX_{211}	—	April 9, 2010	Mount Lemmon	Mount Lemmon Survey	·	1.4 km	MPC · JPL
784845	2015 FL_{213}	—	March 22, 2015	Haleakala	Pan-STARRS 1	L4	7.4 km	MPC · JPL
784846	2015 FA_{214}	—	February 16, 2015	Haleakala	Pan-STARRS 1	·	2.2 km	MPC · JPL
784847	2015 FM_{220}	—	October 11, 2012	Haleakala	Pan-STARRS 1	·	2.4 km	MPC · JPL
784848	2015 FQ_{224}	—	February 16, 2015	Haleakala	Pan-STARRS 1	·	1.6 km	MPC · JPL
784849	2015 FM_{228}	—	October 11, 2012	Haleakala	Pan-STARRS 1	·	2.2 km	MPC · JPL
784850	2015 FQ_{229}	—	November 27, 2013	Haleakala	Pan-STARRS 1	·	1.3 km	MPC · JPL
784851	2015 FC_{237}	—	March 23, 2015	Haleakala	Pan-STARRS 1	EOS	1.2 km	MPC · JPL
784852	2015 FY_{240}	—	March 23, 2015	Haleakala	Pan-STARRS 1	·	2.1 km	MPC · JPL
784853	2015 FG_{248}	—	March 23, 2015	Haleakala	Pan-STARRS 1	·	1.6 km	MPC · JPL
784854	2015 FY_{249}	—	May 1, 2011	Haleakala	Pan-STARRS 1	·	990 m	MPC · JPL
784855	2015 FD_{251}	—	March 23, 2015	Haleakala	Pan-STARRS 1	·	2.2 km	MPC · JPL
784856	2015 FW_{251}	—	March 23, 2015	Haleakala	Pan-STARRS 1	EOS	1.3 km	MPC · JPL
784857	2015 FM_{253}	—	March 13, 2010	Mount Lemmon	Mount Lemmon Survey	·	1.5 km	MPC · JPL
784858	2015 FS_{255}	—	March 23, 2015	Haleakala	Pan-STARRS 1	EMA	2.3 km	MPC · JPL
784859	2015 FK_{257}	—	March 23, 2015	Haleakala	Pan-STARRS 1	EOS	1.3 km	MPC · JPL
784860	2015 FM_{257}	—	October 16, 2012	Mount Lemmon	Mount Lemmon Survey	·	1.6 km	MPC · JPL
784861	2015 FT_{258}	—	March 23, 2015	Haleakala	Pan-STARRS 1	·	1.3 km	MPC · JPL
784862	2015 FG_{266}	—	January 21, 2015	Haleakala	Pan-STARRS 1	·	1.3 km	MPC · JPL
784863	2015 FV_{266}	—	January 28, 2015	Haleakala	Pan-STARRS 1	·	1.6 km	MPC · JPL
784864	2015 FN_{274}	—	January 21, 2015	Haleakala	Pan-STARRS 1	·	1.5 km	MPC · JPL
784865	2015 FM_{277}	—	December 29, 2005	Kitt Peak	Spacewatch	·	1.2 km	MPC · JPL
784866	2015 FW_{279}	—	February 17, 2015	Haleakala	Pan-STARRS 1	·	1.6 km	MPC · JPL
784867	2015 FM_{282}	—	February 18, 2015	Haleakala	Pan-STARRS 1	·	2.1 km	MPC · JPL
784868	2015 FV_{283}	—	March 24, 2015	Haleakala	Pan-STARRS 1	·	1.3 km	MPC · JPL
784869	2015 FA_{289}	—	April 25, 2007	Kitt Peak	Spacewatch	·	1.4 km	MPC · JPL
784870	2015 FY_{294}	—	January 28, 2015	Haleakala	Pan-STARRS 1	·	1.3 km	MPC · JPL
784871	2015 FB_{301}	—	March 28, 2015	Haleakala	Pan-STARRS 1	·	1.7 km	MPC · JPL
784872	2015 FZ_{312}	—	February 18, 2015	Kitt Peak	Research and Education Collaborative Occultation Network	EOS	1.3 km	MPC · JPL
784873	2015 FE_{314}	—	January 18, 2009	Kitt Peak	Spacewatch	EOS	1.1 km	MPC · JPL
784874	2015 FR_{318}	—	March 25, 2015	Haleakala	Pan-STARRS 1	·	1.9 km	MPC · JPL
784875	2015 FF_{319}	—	April 6, 2011	Mount Lemmon	Mount Lemmon Survey	·	970 m	MPC · JPL
784876	2015 FE_{321}	—	March 25, 2015	Haleakala	Pan-STARRS 1	·	2.2 km	MPC · JPL
784877	2015 FQ_{324}	—	March 25, 2015	Haleakala	Pan-STARRS 1	·	2.5 km	MPC · JPL
784878	2015 FX_{325}	—	November 4, 2007	Kitt Peak	Spacewatch	·	2.5 km	MPC · JPL
784879	2015 FT_{328}	—	March 25, 2015	Haleakala	Pan-STARRS 1	·	2.3 km	MPC · JPL
784880	2015 FE_{329}	—	March 25, 2015	Haleakala	Pan-STARRS 1	·	1.8 km	MPC · JPL
784881	2015 FL_{348}	—	March 16, 2015	Haleakala	Pan-STARRS 1	·	2.5 km	MPC · JPL
784882	2015 FA_{350}	—	March 16, 2015	Haleakala	Pan-STARRS 1	BRA	1.1 km	MPC · JPL
784883	2015 FD_{354}	—	April 19, 2004	Kitt Peak	Spacewatch	·	1.8 km	MPC · JPL
784884	2015 FF_{358}	—	March 17, 2015	Haleakala	Pan-STARRS 1	·	1.5 km	MPC · JPL
784885	2015 FR_{361}	—	March 17, 2015	Haleakala	Pan-STARRS 1	·	2.4 km	MPC · JPL
784886	2015 FA_{362}	—	March 17, 2015	Haleakala	Pan-STARRS 1	VER	2.0 km	MPC · JPL
784887	2015 FD_{365}	—	January 26, 2015	Haleakala	Pan-STARRS 1	·	2.3 km	MPC · JPL
784888	2015 FE_{368}	—	October 12, 2007	Kitt Peak	Spacewatch	·	2.2 km	MPC · JPL
784889	2015 FL_{368}	—	February 18, 2015	Haleakala	Pan-STARRS 1	·	2.1 km	MPC · JPL
784890	2015 FU_{369}	—	October 23, 2003	Kitt Peak	Spacewatch	·	1.6 km	MPC · JPL
784891	2015 FO_{371}	—	March 18, 2015	Haleakala	Pan-STARRS 1	L4	6.0 km	MPC · JPL
784892	2015 FZ_{375}	—	March 18, 2015	Haleakala	Pan-STARRS 1	L4	7.5 km	MPC · JPL
784893	2015 FJ_{376}	—	October 15, 2013	Mount Lemmon	Mount Lemmon Survey	LIX	2.8 km	MPC · JPL
784894	2015 FQ_{376}	—	January 26, 2015	Haleakala	Pan-STARRS 1	·	2.1 km	MPC · JPL
784895	2015 FU_{376}	—	December 7, 2008	Mount Lemmon	Mount Lemmon Survey	·	1.8 km	MPC · JPL
784896	2015 FO_{378}	—	March 20, 2015	Haleakala	Pan-STARRS 1	TIR	1.8 km	MPC · JPL
784897	2015 FS_{387}	—	October 8, 2012	Haleakala	Pan-STARRS 1	EOS	1.4 km	MPC · JPL
784898	2015 FS_{388}	—	January 22, 2015	Haleakala	Pan-STARRS 1	·	1.1 km	MPC · JPL
784899	2015 FU_{388}	—	March 20, 2015	Haleakala	Pan-STARRS 1	·	1.5 km	MPC · JPL
784900	2015 FY_{391}	—	March 20, 2015	Haleakala	Pan-STARRS 1	·	1.3 km	MPC · JPL

== 784901–785000 ==
back to top

Designation			Discovery			Properties		Ref
Permanent	Provisional	Named after	Date	Site	Discoverer(s)	Category	Diam.	Ref
784901	2015 FE_{392}	—	March 20, 2015	Haleakala	Pan-STARRS 1	L4 · ERY	5.8 km	MPC · JPL
784902	2015 FK_{392}	—	March 20, 2015	Haleakala	Pan-STARRS 1	·	1.8 km	MPC · JPL
784903	2015 FZ_{394}	—	March 21, 2015	Haleakala	Pan-STARRS 1	·	1.3 km	MPC · JPL
784904	2015 FC_{395}	—	March 21, 2015	Haleakala	Pan-STARRS 1	·	1.7 km	MPC · JPL
784905	2015 FG_{402}	—	March 27, 2015	Westfield	International Astronomical Search Collaboration	EOS	1.3 km	MPC · JPL
784906	2015 FZ_{402}	—	September 25, 2011	Haleakala	Pan-STARRS 1	·	2.1 km	MPC · JPL
784907	2015 FA_{404}	—	January 21, 2014	Mount Lemmon	Mount Lemmon Survey	·	1.8 km	MPC · JPL
784908	2015 FK_{406}	—	January 29, 2014	Mount Lemmon	Mount Lemmon Survey	THM	1.8 km	MPC · JPL
784909	2015 FY_{410}	—	January 28, 2015	Haleakala	Pan-STARRS 1	EOS	1.4 km	MPC · JPL
784910	2015 FT_{417}	—	February 24, 2015	Haleakala	Pan-STARRS 1	AEG	1.7 km	MPC · JPL
784911	2015 FJ_{425}	—	March 28, 2015	Haleakala	Pan-STARRS 1	·	2.0 km	MPC · JPL
784912	2015 FA_{426}	—	March 18, 2015	Haleakala	Pan-STARRS 1	·	770 m	MPC · JPL
784913	2015 FM_{426}	—	March 29, 2015	Haleakala	Pan-STARRS 1	·	1.4 km	MPC · JPL
784914	2015 FR_{426}	—	March 22, 2015	Haleakala	Pan-STARRS 1	·	2.1 km	MPC · JPL
784915	2015 FF_{427}	—	March 17, 2015	Haleakala	Pan-STARRS 1	HYG	1.9 km	MPC · JPL
784916	2015 FZ_{427}	—	March 18, 2015	Haleakala	Pan-STARRS 1	·	1.9 km	MPC · JPL
784917	2015 FA_{428}	—	March 21, 2015	Mount Lemmon	Mount Lemmon Survey	·	1.1 km	MPC · JPL
784918	2015 FB_{428}	—	March 17, 2015	Haleakala	Pan-STARRS 1	·	2.0 km	MPC · JPL
784919	2015 FL_{428}	—	March 16, 2015	Haleakala	Pan-STARRS 1	TIR	2.3 km	MPC · JPL
784920	2015 FT_{428}	—	March 22, 2015	Mount Lemmon	Mount Lemmon Survey	·	1.4 km	MPC · JPL
784921	2015 FW_{428}	—	March 16, 2015	Mount Lemmon	Mount Lemmon Survey	AGN	970 m	MPC · JPL
784922	2015 FZ_{428}	—	March 23, 2015	Haleakala	Pan-STARRS 1	·	2.0 km	MPC · JPL
784923	2015 FM_{429}	—	March 29, 2015	Haleakala	Pan-STARRS 1	·	1.9 km	MPC · JPL
784924	2015 FO_{429}	—	September 6, 2008	Kitt Peak	Spacewatch	(5)	840 m	MPC · JPL
784925	2015 FC_{430}	—	March 30, 2015	Haleakala	Pan-STARRS 1	·	2.0 km	MPC · JPL
784926	2015 FU_{430}	—	March 22, 2015	Haleakala	Pan-STARRS 1	·	1.6 km	MPC · JPL
784927	2015 FN_{431}	—	March 22, 2015	Haleakala	Pan-STARRS 1	·	1.9 km	MPC · JPL
784928	2015 FX_{431}	—	March 18, 2015	Haleakala	Pan-STARRS 1	·	1.5 km	MPC · JPL
784929	2015 FT_{433}	—	March 24, 2015	Mount Lemmon	Mount Lemmon Survey	·	2.0 km	MPC · JPL
784930	2015 FW_{434}	—	March 28, 2015	Haleakala	Pan-STARRS 1	·	1.9 km	MPC · JPL
784931	2015 FX_{434}	—	March 22, 2015	Haleakala	Pan-STARRS 1	·	2.0 km	MPC · JPL
784932	2015 FD_{436}	—	March 18, 2015	Haleakala	Pan-STARRS 1	·	1.2 km	MPC · JPL
784933	2015 FF_{436}	—	March 19, 2015	Haleakala	Pan-STARRS 1	·	1.1 km	MPC · JPL
784934	2015 FN_{436}	—	March 24, 2015	Haleakala	Pan-STARRS 1	·	1.5 km	MPC · JPL
784935	2015 FD_{437}	—	March 19, 2015	Haleakala	Pan-STARRS 1	·	800 m	MPC · JPL
784936	2015 FQ_{438}	—	March 22, 2015	Haleakala	Pan-STARRS 1	EOS	1.4 km	MPC · JPL
784937	2015 FA_{439}	—	March 23, 2015	Kitt Peak	Wasserman, L. H., M. W. Buie	KOR	990 m	MPC · JPL
784938	2015 FH_{439}	—	March 17, 2015	Mount Lemmon	Mount Lemmon Survey	·	1.3 km	MPC · JPL
784939	2015 FO_{440}	—	March 25, 2015	Haleakala	Pan-STARRS 1	·	2.0 km	MPC · JPL
784940	2015 FN_{441}	—	March 18, 2015	Haleakala	Pan-STARRS 1	L4	7.5 km	MPC · JPL
784941	2015 FQ_{442}	—	January 26, 2015	Haleakala	Pan-STARRS 1	·	1.0 km	MPC · JPL
784942	2015 FX_{442}	—	March 19, 2015	Haleakala	Pan-STARRS 1	·	2.5 km	MPC · JPL
784943	2015 FP_{443}	—	March 27, 2015	Kitt Peak	Spacewatch	·	2.2 km	MPC · JPL
784944	2015 FX_{443}	—	March 22, 2015	Haleakala	Pan-STARRS 1	·	2.1 km	MPC · JPL
784945	2015 FY_{443}	—	March 17, 2015	Haleakala	Pan-STARRS 1	·	2.0 km	MPC · JPL
784946	2015 FL_{444}	—	March 21, 2015	Haleakala	Pan-STARRS 1	·	2.3 km	MPC · JPL
784947	2015 FP_{444}	—	March 17, 2015	Mount Lemmon	Mount Lemmon Survey	·	1.3 km	MPC · JPL
784948	2015 FW_{444}	—	March 16, 2015	Mount Lemmon	Mount Lemmon Survey	·	1.7 km	MPC · JPL
784949	2015 FG_{445}	—	March 23, 2015	Haleakala	Pan-STARRS 1	L4	6.5 km	MPC · JPL
784950	2015 FW_{445}	—	March 23, 2015	Haleakala	Pan-STARRS 1	·	1.4 km	MPC · JPL
784951	2015 FU_{446}	—	March 29, 2015	Haleakala	Pan-STARRS 1	EOS	1.2 km	MPC · JPL
784952	2015 FB_{447}	—	January 22, 2015	Haleakala	Pan-STARRS 1	·	1.6 km	MPC · JPL
784953	2015 FJ_{447}	—	March 17, 2015	Haleakala	Pan-STARRS 1	·	1.9 km	MPC · JPL
784954	2015 FS_{447}	—	March 22, 2015	Haleakala	Pan-STARRS 1	EOS	1.3 km	MPC · JPL
784955	2015 FW_{448}	—	March 23, 2015	Kitt Peak	Spacewatch	·	750 m	MPC · JPL
784956	2015 FJ_{449}	—	March 27, 2015	Haleakala	Pan-STARRS 1	EOS	1.2 km	MPC · JPL
784957	2015 FT_{450}	—	March 25, 2015	Haleakala	Pan-STARRS 1	L4	6.9 km	MPC · JPL
784958	2015 FV_{450}	—	March 24, 2015	Mount Lemmon	Mount Lemmon Survey	L4	6.3 km	MPC · JPL
784959	2015 FJ_{452}	—	March 23, 2015	Haleakala	Pan-STARRS 1	L4	5.9 km	MPC · JPL
784960	2015 FP_{452}	—	March 17, 2015	Kitt Peak	Spacewatch	·	2.2 km	MPC · JPL
784961	2015 FB_{454}	—	March 19, 2015	Haleakala	Pan-STARRS 1	·	2.1 km	MPC · JPL
784962	2015 FV_{457}	—	March 17, 2015	Haleakala	Pan-STARRS 1	·	2.2 km	MPC · JPL
784963	2015 FC_{458}	—	March 30, 2015	Haleakala	Pan-STARRS 1	L4	6.3 km	MPC · JPL
784964	2015 FH_{459}	—	March 22, 2015	Haleakala	Pan-STARRS 1	·	1.8 km	MPC · JPL
784965	2015 FK_{459}	—	March 18, 2015	Haleakala	Pan-STARRS 1	EOS	1.2 km	MPC · JPL
784966	2015 FE_{460}	—	March 21, 2015	Haleakala	Pan-STARRS 1	·	2.4 km	MPC · JPL
784967	2015 FH_{466}	—	March 27, 2015	Haleakala	Pan-STARRS 1	·	2.0 km	MPC · JPL
784968	2015 FP_{466}	—	March 18, 2015	Haleakala	Pan-STARRS 1	·	1.6 km	MPC · JPL
784969	2015 FX_{466}	—	March 24, 2015	Mount Lemmon	Mount Lemmon Survey	·	1.8 km	MPC · JPL
784970	2015 FZ_{466}	—	March 25, 2015	Haleakala	Pan-STARRS 1	EOS	1.4 km	MPC · JPL
784971	2015 FE_{467}	—	March 21, 2015	Haleakala	Pan-STARRS 1	·	1.9 km	MPC · JPL
784972	2015 FH_{467}	—	March 16, 2015	Haleakala	Pan-STARRS 1	EOS	1.3 km	MPC · JPL
784973	2015 FJ_{467}	—	March 28, 2015	Haleakala	Pan-STARRS 1	·	1.8 km	MPC · JPL
784974	2015 FR_{467}	—	March 24, 2015	Haleakala	Pan-STARRS 1	L4	5.5 km	MPC · JPL
784975	2015 FU_{467}	—	March 22, 2015	Haleakala	Pan-STARRS 1	·	1.4 km	MPC · JPL
784976	2015 FU_{468}	—	March 21, 2015	Haleakala	Pan-STARRS 1	·	2.0 km	MPC · JPL
784977	2015 FO_{471}	—	March 24, 2015	Haleakala	Pan-STARRS 1	·	2.0 km	MPC · JPL
784978	2015 FY_{471}	—	March 23, 2015	Kitt Peak	Wasserman, L. H., M. W. Buie	·	1.8 km	MPC · JPL
784979	2015 FA_{472}	—	March 22, 2015	Mount Lemmon	Mount Lemmon Survey	EOS	1.4 km	MPC · JPL
784980	2015 FB_{472}	—	March 27, 2015	Haleakala	Pan-STARRS 1	·	1.9 km	MPC · JPL
784981	2015 FR_{472}	—	March 17, 2015	Haleakala	Pan-STARRS 1	·	2.7 km	MPC · JPL
784982	2015 FS_{472}	—	March 20, 2015	Haleakala	Pan-STARRS 1	·	1.6 km	MPC · JPL
784983	2015 FW_{472}	—	March 28, 2015	Kitt Peak	Spacewatch	·	1.3 km	MPC · JPL
784984	2015 FX_{472}	—	March 22, 2015	Haleakala	Pan-STARRS 1	·	1.7 km	MPC · JPL
784985	2015 FB_{474}	—	March 25, 2015	Haleakala	Pan-STARRS 1	EOS	1.3 km	MPC · JPL
784986	2015 FF_{474}	—	March 27, 2015	Haleakala	Pan-STARRS 1	EOS	1.2 km	MPC · JPL
784987	2015 FF_{484}	—	October 21, 2012	Haleakala	Pan-STARRS 1	·	2.9 km	MPC · JPL
784988	2015 GE_{6}	—	November 26, 2013	Mount Lemmon	Mount Lemmon Survey	PHO	1.4 km	MPC · JPL
784989	2015 GJ_{9}	—	March 29, 2015	Haleakala	Pan-STARRS 1	·	2.0 km	MPC · JPL
784990	2015 GR_{14}	—	February 27, 2015	Haleakala	Pan-STARRS 1	·	1.4 km	MPC · JPL
784991	2015 GV_{19}	—	January 2, 2009	Kitt Peak	Spacewatch	·	1.4 km	MPC · JPL
784992	2015 GP_{22}	—	April 12, 2015	Haleakala	Pan-STARRS 1	·	1.5 km	MPC · JPL
784993	2015 GK_{29}	—	February 20, 2009	Mount Lemmon	Mount Lemmon Survey	THM	1.9 km	MPC · JPL
784994	2015 GP_{32}	—	April 13, 2015	Haleakala	Pan-STARRS 1	·	2.3 km	MPC · JPL
784995	2015 GH_{41}	—	March 27, 2015	Haleakala	Pan-STARRS 1	·	2.0 km	MPC · JPL
784996	2015 GF_{42}	—	April 14, 2010	Kitt Peak	Spacewatch	EOS	1.4 km	MPC · JPL
784997	2015 GT_{43}	—	February 23, 2015	Haleakala	Pan-STARRS 1	·	1.4 km	MPC · JPL
784998	2015 GZ_{47}	—	March 27, 2015	Haleakala	Pan-STARRS 1	·	1.8 km	MPC · JPL
784999	2015 GF_{52}	—	January 30, 2009	Mount Lemmon	Mount Lemmon Survey	·	2.1 km	MPC · JPL
785000	2015 GN_{60}	—	April 15, 2015	Kitt Peak	Spacewatch	·	1.7 km	MPC · JPL

back to top
