= List of minor planets: 874001–875000 =

The following is a partial list of minor planets, running from minor-planet number 874001 through 875000, inclusive. The primary data for this and other partial lists is based on JPL's "Small-Body Orbital Elements" and data available from the Minor Planet Center. Critical list information is also provided by the MPC, unless otherwise specified from Lowell Observatory. A detailed description of the table's columns and additional sources are given on the main page including a complete list of every page in this series, and a statistical break-up on the dynamical classification of minor planets.

Also see the summary list of all named bodies in numerical and alphabetical order, and the corresponding naming citations for the number range of this particular list. New namings may only be added to this list after official publication, as the preannouncement of names is condemned by the Working Group for Small Bodies Nomenclature of the International Astronomical Union.

Near-Earth obj.	MBA (inner)	MBA (outer)	Centaur
Mars-crosser	MBA (middle)	Jupiter trojan	Trans-Neptunian obj.
Unclassified

== 874001–874100 ==
Designation			Discovery			Properties		Ref
Permanent	Provisional	Named after	Date	Site	Discoverer(s)	Category	Diam.	Ref
874001	2020 HL_{99}	—	April 20, 2020	Haleakala	Pan-STARRS 2	·	1 km	MPC · JPL
874002	2020 HM_{100}	—	April 22, 2020	Haleakala	Pan-STARRS 1	HNS	670 m	MPC · JPL
874003	2020 HH_{110}	—	April 21, 2020	Haleakala	Pan-STARRS 1	·	1.8 km	MPC · JPL
874004	2020 HL_{114}	—	April 27, 2020	Haleakala	Pan-STARRS 1	L5	7.3 km	MPC · JPL
874005	2020 HC_{115}	—	May 6, 2016	Haleakala	Pan-STARRS 1	·	740 m	MPC · JPL
874006	2020 HQ_{115}	—	October 26, 2008	Mount Lemmon	Mount Lemmon Survey	·	1.3 km	MPC · JPL
874007	2020 HN_{116}	—	April 22, 2020	Haleakala	Pan-STARRS 1	L5	6.3 km	MPC · JPL
874008	2020 HQ_{116}	—	April 21, 2020	Haleakala	Pan-STARRS 1	L5	5.6 km	MPC · JPL
874009	2020 HB_{117}	—	April 21, 2020	Haleakala	Pan-STARRS 2	L5	6.7 km	MPC · JPL
874010	2020 HM_{117}	—	April 21, 2020	Haleakala	Pan-STARRS 1	ADE	1.4 km	MPC · JPL
874011	2020 HR_{117}	—	April 19, 2020	Haleakala	Pan-STARRS 2	L5	6.9 km	MPC · JPL
874012	2020 HV_{118}	—	April 22, 2020	Haleakala	Pan-STARRS 1	EOS	1.3 km	MPC · JPL
874013	2020 HU_{120}	—	April 21, 2020	Haleakala	Pan-STARRS 1	L5	6.3 km	MPC · JPL
874014	2020 HE_{122}	—	April 19, 2020	Haleakala	Pan-STARRS 1	·	1.1 km	MPC · JPL
874015	2020 HO_{122}	—	September 24, 2014	Mount Lemmon	Mount Lemmon Survey	PHO	600 m	MPC · JPL
874016	2020 HH_{127}	—	May 1, 2016	Cerro Tololo	DECam	·	530 m	MPC · JPL
874017	2020 HQ_{127}	—	June 12, 2016	Mount Lemmon	Mount Lemmon Survey	·	1.2 km	MPC · JPL
874018	2020 HS_{128}	—	April 29, 2012	Kitt Peak	Spacewatch	·	690 m	MPC · JPL
874019	2020 HF_{129}	—	December 20, 2014	Haleakala	Pan-STARRS 1	L5	6.5 km	MPC · JPL
874020	2020 HL_{129}	—	April 21, 2020	Haleakala	Pan-STARRS 1	·	1.1 km	MPC · JPL
874021	2020 HH_{130}	—	April 27, 2020	Haleakala	Pan-STARRS 1	(5)	750 m	MPC · JPL
874022	2020 HS_{130}	—	April 21, 2020	Haleakala	Pan-STARRS 2	·	1.0 km	MPC · JPL
874023	2020 HU_{130}	—	April 22, 2020	Mount Lemmon	Mount Lemmon Survey	·	860 m	MPC · JPL
874024	2020 HZ_{130}	—	April 16, 2020	Mount Lemmon	Mount Lemmon Survey	H	330 m	MPC · JPL
874025	2020 HB_{134}	—	April 28, 2020	Mount Lemmon	Mount Lemmon Survey	·	860 m	MPC · JPL
874026	2020 HA_{140}	—	April 27, 2020	Haleakala	Pan-STARRS 1	·	970 m	MPC · JPL
874027	2020 HZ_{143}	—	April 23, 2020	Mount Lemmon	Mount Lemmon Survey	ADE	1.2 km	MPC · JPL
874028	2020 HR_{144}	—	April 20, 2020	Haleakala	Pan-STARRS 1	EOS	1.2 km	MPC · JPL
874029	2020 HZ_{145}	—	October 24, 2013	Mount Lemmon	Mount Lemmon Survey	L5	5.9 km	MPC · JPL
874030	2020 HN_{179}	—	April 24, 2020	Mount Lemmon	Mount Lemmon Survey	L5	6.2 km	MPC · JPL
874031	2020 HG_{180}	—	April 22, 2020	Haleakala	Pan-STARRS 1	L5	5.7 km	MPC · JPL
874032	2020 HX_{198}	—	November 23, 2014	Haleakala	Pan-STARRS 1	L5	7.2 km	MPC · JPL
874033	2020 HQ_{205}	—	April 22, 2020	Haleakala	Pan-STARRS 1	L5	6.6 km	MPC · JPL
874034	2020 HJ_{212}	—	January 8, 2019	Haleakala	Pan-STARRS 1	·	1.9 km	MPC · JPL
874035	2020 JB_{6}	—	May 14, 2020	Haleakala	Pan-STARRS 1	·	1.0 km	MPC · JPL
874036	2020 JJ_{6}	—	October 1, 2005	Mount Lemmon	Mount Lemmon Survey	·	650 m	MPC · JPL
874037	2020 JQ_{6}	—	December 9, 2018	Mount Lemmon	Mount Lemmon Survey	·	1.0 km	MPC · JPL
874038	2020 JA_{8}	—	February 10, 2015	Mount Lemmon	Mount Lemmon Survey	·	930 m	MPC · JPL
874039	2020 JC_{9}	—	May 14, 2020	Haleakala	Pan-STARRS 1	·	1.2 km	MPC · JPL
874040	2020 JF_{9}	—	September 25, 2017	Haleakala	Pan-STARRS 1	·	790 m	MPC · JPL
874041	2020 JC_{16}	—	May 14, 2020	Mount Lemmon	Mount Lemmon Survey	·	960 m	MPC · JPL
874042	2020 JS_{17}	—	May 13, 2020	Mount Lemmon	Mount Lemmon Survey	·	1.3 km	MPC · JPL
874043	2020 JX_{17}	—	May 13, 2020	Mount Lemmon	Mount Lemmon Survey	·	850 m	MPC · JPL
874044	2020 JV_{18}	—	November 17, 2017	Haleakala	Pan-STARRS 1	·	850 m	MPC · JPL
874045	2020 JH_{20}	—	May 14, 2020	Haleakala	Pan-STARRS 1	·	1.0 km	MPC · JPL
874046	2020 JC_{22}	—	May 15, 2020	Haleakala	Pan-STARRS 1	L5	5.9 km	MPC · JPL
874047	2020 JF_{22}	—	May 15, 2020	Haleakala	Pan-STARRS 1	·	690 m	MPC · JPL
874048	2020 JL_{22}	—	May 14, 2020	Haleakala	Pan-STARRS 1	·	990 m	MPC · JPL
874049	2020 JE_{26}	—	May 13, 2020	Mount Lemmon	Mount Lemmon Survey	MAR	780 m	MPC · JPL
874050	2020 JN_{27}	—	May 14, 2020	Haleakala	Pan-STARRS 1	·	870 m	MPC · JPL
874051	2020 JT_{27}	—	May 14, 2020	Haleakala	Pan-STARRS 1	·	1.0 km	MPC · JPL
874052	2020 JN_{28}	—	May 11, 2020	Haleakala	Pan-STARRS 1	·	740 m	MPC · JPL
874053	2020 JR_{28}	—	May 14, 2020	Haleakala	Pan-STARRS 1	L5	7.1 km	MPC · JPL
874054	2020 JD_{30}	—	September 17, 2004	Kitt Peak	Spacewatch	·	1.2 km	MPC · JPL
874055	2020 JD_{32}	—	May 15, 2020	Haleakala	Pan-STARRS 1	L5	5.4 km	MPC · JPL
874056	2020 JA_{33}	—	May 14, 2020	Haleakala	Pan-STARRS 1	MAR	740 m	MPC · JPL
874057	2020 JV_{34}	—	May 15, 2020	Haleakala	Pan-STARRS 1	·	840 m	MPC · JPL
874058	2020 JU_{36}	—	November 26, 2014	Mount Lemmon	Mount Lemmon Survey	·	890 m	MPC · JPL
874059	2020 JR_{37}	—	May 14, 2020	Haleakala	Pan-STARRS 1	·	1.2 km	MPC · JPL
874060	2020 JK_{38}	—	May 15, 2020	Haleakala	Pan-STARRS 1	·	970 m	MPC · JPL
874061	2020 JQ_{46}	—	May 15, 2020	Haleakala	Pan-STARRS 1	L5	5.5 km	MPC · JPL
874062	2020 JB_{47}	—	May 15, 2020	Haleakala	Pan-STARRS 1	·	440 m	MPC · JPL
874063	2020 JV_{48}	—	May 14, 2020	Haleakala	Pan-STARRS 1	L5	6.6 km	MPC · JPL
874064	2020 JQ_{49}	—	October 26, 2013	Mount Lemmon	Mount Lemmon Survey	L5	6.1 km	MPC · JPL
874065	2020 JZ_{49}	—	January 30, 2011	Mount Lemmon	Mount Lemmon Survey	·	1.2 km	MPC · JPL
874066	2020 KU_{4}	—	January 15, 2007	Mauna Kea	P. A. Wiegert	·	1.2 km	MPC · JPL
874067	2020 KB_{6}	—	November 7, 2018	Haleakala	Pan-STARRS 2	H	450 m	MPC · JPL
874068	2020 KQ_{8}	—	May 17, 2020	Haleakala	Pan-STARRS 2	EUN	900 m	MPC · JPL
874069	2020 KS_{8}	—	August 28, 2016	Kitt Peak	Spacewatch	·	920 m	MPC · JPL
874070	2020 KE_{11}	—	May 20, 2020	Haleakala	Pan-STARRS 1	·	980 m	MPC · JPL
874071	2020 KB_{12}	—	September 9, 2007	Kitt Peak	Spacewatch	·	490 m	MPC · JPL
874072	2020 KY_{12}	—	February 16, 2015	Haleakala	Pan-STARRS 1	·	1.0 km	MPC · JPL
874073	2020 KN_{13}	—	July 4, 2016	Haleakala	Pan-STARRS 1	·	870 m	MPC · JPL
874074	2020 KJ_{14}	—	May 20, 2020	Haleakala	Pan-STARRS 2	·	930 m	MPC · JPL
874075	2020 KN_{14}	—	May 20, 2020	Haleakala	Pan-STARRS 2	·	880 m	MPC · JPL
874076	2020 KR_{16}	—	May 30, 2020	Haleakala	Pan-STARRS 1	·	790 m	MPC · JPL
874077	2020 KR_{17}	—	May 30, 2020	Haleakala	Pan-STARRS 1	·	1.4 km	MPC · JPL
874078	2020 KO_{19}	—	May 24, 2020	Mount Lemmon	Mount Lemmon Survey	·	970 m	MPC · JPL
874079	2020 KM_{21}	—	May 25, 2009	Kitt Peak	Spacewatch	·	790 m	MPC · JPL
874080	2020 KL_{22}	—	September 4, 2008	Kitt Peak	Spacewatch	EUN	730 m	MPC · JPL
874081	2020 KH_{24}	—	May 20, 2020	Haleakala	Pan-STARRS 1	·	980 m	MPC · JPL
874082	2020 KJ_{24}	—	May 20, 2020	Haleakala	Pan-STARRS 1	·	1.1 km	MPC · JPL
874083	2020 KH_{25}	—	May 25, 2020	Mount Lemmon	Mount Lemmon Survey	EOS	1.3 km	MPC · JPL
874084	2020 KD_{29}	—	May 21, 2020	Haleakala	Pan-STARRS 1	EOS	1.3 km	MPC · JPL
874085	2020 KQ_{31}	—	May 24, 2020	Haleakala	Pan-STARRS 1	·	1.3 km	MPC · JPL
874086	2020 KX_{31}	—	May 21, 2020	Haleakala	Pan-STARRS 1	·	1.3 km	MPC · JPL
874087	2020 KR_{33}	—	May 17, 2020	Haleakala	Pan-STARRS 1	H	350 m	MPC · JPL
874088	2020 KR_{36}	—	May 28, 2020	Haleakala	Pan-STARRS 1	·	2.8 km	MPC · JPL
874089	2020 KT_{39}	—	May 23, 2020	Haleakala	Pan-STARRS 1	NAE	1.5 km	MPC · JPL
874090	2020 KB_{40}	—	July 13, 2010	Mauna Kea	P. A. Wiegert	EUP	2.6 km	MPC · JPL
874091	2020 KK_{40}	—	September 9, 2016	Mount Lemmon	Mount Lemmon Survey	KOR	980 m	MPC · JPL
874092	2020 KH_{41}	—	August 27, 2016	Haleakala	Pan-STARRS 1	EMA	1.7 km	MPC · JPL
874093	2020 KL_{41}	—	May 18, 2020	Haleakala	Pan-STARRS 1	ADE	1.3 km	MPC · JPL
874094	2020 KC_{44}	—	May 21, 2020	Haleakala	Pan-STARRS 1	·	1.0 km	MPC · JPL
874095	2020 KN_{44}	—	November 17, 2014	Haleakala	Pan-STARRS 1	·	780 m	MPC · JPL
874096	2020 KO_{44}	—	June 21, 2012	Mount Lemmon	Mount Lemmon Survey	·	1.1 km	MPC · JPL
874097	2020 KT_{44}	—	May 21, 2020	Haleakala	Pan-STARRS 1	·	880 m	MPC · JPL
874098	2020 KU_{44}	—	May 27, 2020	Mount Lemmon	Mount Lemmon Survey	EUN	820 m	MPC · JPL
874099	2020 KQ_{48}	—	May 20, 2020	Haleakala	Pan-STARRS 1	L5	6.9 km	MPC · JPL
874100	2020 KZ_{48}	—	May 24, 2020	Haleakala	Pan-STARRS 1	·	880 m	MPC · JPL

== 874101–874200 ==
back to top

Designation			Discovery			Properties		Ref
Permanent	Provisional	Named after	Date	Site	Discoverer(s)	Category	Diam.	Ref
874101	2020 KC_{49}	—	May 16, 2020	Haleakala	Pan-STARRS 1	·	950 m	MPC · JPL
874102	2020 KS_{65}	—	May 23, 2020	Haleakala	Pan-STARRS 1	·	1 km	MPC · JPL
874103	2020 KU_{65}	—	May 19, 2020	Haleakala	Pan-STARRS 1	·	780 m	MPC · JPL
874104	2020 LT_{5}	—	November 2, 2016	Mount Lemmon	Mount Lemmon Survey	·	880 m	MPC · JPL
874105	2020 LY_{6}	—	June 15, 2020	Haleakala	Pan-STARRS 1	·	1.3 km	MPC · JPL
874106	2020 LQ_{8}	—	June 11, 2020	Pleasant Groves	Holbrook, M.	·	920 m	MPC · JPL
874107	2020 LB_{10}	—	June 13, 2020	Haleakala	Pan-STARRS 1	·	1.0 km	MPC · JPL
874108	2020 LC_{10}	—	March 13, 2011	Mount Lemmon	Mount Lemmon Survey	·	1.0 km	MPC · JPL
874109	2020 LU_{10}	—	December 29, 2014	Haleakala	Pan-STARRS 1	V	460 m	MPC · JPL
874110	2020 LZ_{15}	—	June 15, 2020	Haleakala	Pan-STARRS 1	·	1.4 km	MPC · JPL
874111	2020 LK_{16}	—	June 15, 2020	Haleakala	Pan-STARRS 1	AGN	820 m	MPC · JPL
874112	2020 MC_{5}	—	June 29, 2020	Haleakala	Pan-STARRS 1	H	240 m	MPC · JPL
874113	2020 MT_{7}	—	November 11, 2013	Mount Lemmon	Mount Lemmon Survey	·	900 m	MPC · JPL
874114	2020 MJ_{8}	—	June 17, 2020	Haleakala	Pan-STARRS 1	EUN	860 m	MPC · JPL
874115	2020 MR_{8}	—	May 22, 2015	Haleakala	Pan-STARRS 1	WIT	630 m	MPC · JPL
874116	2020 MT_{8}	—	June 26, 2020	Haleakala	Pan-STARRS 2	·	1.2 km	MPC · JPL
874117	2020 MY_{8}	—	June 28, 2020	Haleakala	Pan-STARRS 2	·	1.6 km	MPC · JPL
874118	2020 MK_{11}	—	June 29, 2020	Haleakala	Pan-STARRS 1	·	1.4 km	MPC · JPL
874119	2020 MM_{11}	—	July 29, 2009	Kitt Peak	Spacewatch	·	800 m	MPC · JPL
874120	2020 MB_{16}	—	May 2, 2014	Cerro Tololo-DECam	DECam	·	1.5 km	MPC · JPL
874121	2020 MJ_{17}	—	June 16, 2020	Haleakala	Pan-STARRS 1	·	1.3 km	MPC · JPL
874122	2020 MS_{17}	—	June 16, 2020	Haleakala	Pan-STARRS 1	H	370 m	MPC · JPL
874123	2020 MZ_{18}	—	June 29, 2020	Haleakala	Pan-STARRS 1	·	1.9 km	MPC · JPL
874124	2020 ME_{21}	—	June 29, 2020	Haleakala	Pan-STARRS 1	·	1.2 km	MPC · JPL
874125	2020 MN_{21}	—	April 28, 2014	Cerro Tololo	DECam	·	1.3 km	MPC · JPL
874126	2020 MA_{22}	—	June 17, 2020	Haleakala	Pan-STARRS 2	EUN	970 m	MPC · JPL
874127	2020 MC_{24}	—	June 27, 2020	Haleakala	Pan-STARRS 1	H	380 m	MPC · JPL
874128	2020 ML_{36}	—	June 17, 2020	Haleakala	Pan-STARRS 1	H	340 m	MPC · JPL
874129	2020 MQ_{36}	—	September 23, 2017	Haleakala	Pan-STARRS 1	·	1.0 km	MPC · JPL
874130	2020 MS_{42}	—	June 21, 2020	Haleakala	Pan-STARRS 1	ADE	1.3 km	MPC · JPL
874131	2020 MH_{43}	—	June 28, 2020	Haleakala	Pan-STARRS 1	·	2.0 km	MPC · JPL
874132	2020 MT_{43}	—	June 22, 2020	Haleakala	Pan-STARRS 1	·	740 m	MPC · JPL
874133	2020 MF_{44}	—	June 21, 2020	Haleakala	Pan-STARRS 1	·	1.1 km	MPC · JPL
874134	2020 MG_{45}	—	June 29, 2020	Haleakala	Pan-STARRS 1	·	1.4 km	MPC · JPL
874135	2020 ME_{46}	—	June 20, 2020	Haleakala	Pan-STARRS 1	·	1.3 km	MPC · JPL
874136	2020 MR_{46}	—	June 16, 2020	Haleakala	Pan-STARRS 1	·	950 m	MPC · JPL
874137	2020 MK_{47}	—	December 12, 2012	Mount Lemmon	Mount Lemmon Survey	GAL	940 m	MPC · JPL
874138	2020 MU_{51}	—	June 22, 2020	Haleakala	Pan-STARRS 1	EOS	1.3 km	MPC · JPL
874139	2020 NL_{2}	—	July 12, 2020	Mount Lemmon	Mount Lemmon Survey	·	530 m	MPC · JPL
874140	2020 NQ_{2}	—	July 13, 2020	Haleakala	Pan-STARRS 1	·	1.2 km	MPC · JPL
874141	2020 NF_{4}	—	May 18, 2015	Haleakala	Pan-STARRS 1	·	1.3 km	MPC · JPL
874142	2020 NA_{5}	—	July 14, 2020	Mount Lemmon	Mount Lemmon Survey	·	630 m	MPC · JPL
874143	2020 NG_{7}	—	July 14, 2020	Haleakala	Pan-STARRS 1	·	1.1 km	MPC · JPL
874144	2020 OB_{8}	—	November 13, 2007	Mount Lemmon	Mount Lemmon Survey	·	1.1 km	MPC · JPL
874145	2020 OA_{9}	—	October 31, 2013	Mount Lemmon	Mount Lemmon Survey	·	760 m	MPC · JPL
874146	2020 OJ_{10}	—	August 15, 2006	Palomar	NEAT	·	570 m	MPC · JPL
874147	2020 OU_{10}	—	October 10, 2016	Haleakala	Pan-STARRS 1	EUN	850 m	MPC · JPL
874148	2020 OE_{13}	—	May 2, 2019	Haleakala	Pan-STARRS 1	·	2.2 km	MPC · JPL
874149	2020 OF_{13}	—	July 17, 2020	Haleakala	Pan-STARRS 1	·	1.4 km	MPC · JPL
874150	2020 OR_{13}	—	July 18, 2020	Haleakala	Pan-STARRS 1	·	900 m	MPC · JPL
874151	2020 OG_{14}	—	July 17, 2020	Haleakala	Pan-STARRS 1	·	910 m	MPC · JPL
874152	2020 OU_{14}	—	July 23, 2020	Haleakala	Pan-STARRS 2	PHO	610 m	MPC · JPL
874153	2020 OL_{23}	—	April 29, 2014	Cerro Tololo	DECam	·	1.5 km	MPC · JPL
874154	2020 OP_{29}	—	July 18, 2020	Haleakala	Pan-STARRS 1	·	1.8 km	MPC · JPL
874155	2020 OU_{30}	—	April 18, 2010	Mauna Kea	P. A. Wiegert	3:2	3.6 km	MPC · JPL
874156	2020 OB_{31}	—	July 17, 2020	Haleakala	Pan-STARRS 1	·	2.2 km	MPC · JPL
874157	2020 OV_{32}	—	July 18, 2020	Haleakala	Pan-STARRS 1	·	840 m	MPC · JPL
874158	2020 OE_{33}	—	April 24, 2019	Haleakala	Pan-STARRS 1	AGN	850 m	MPC · JPL
874159	2020 OG_{33}	—	July 27, 2020	Mount Lemmon	Mount Lemmon Survey	TIN	690 m	MPC · JPL
874160	2020 OS_{35}	—	July 20, 2020	Haleakala	Pan-STARRS 1	·	1.2 km	MPC · JPL
874161	2020 OF_{38}	—	July 31, 2020	Haleakala	Pan-STARRS 2	·	770 m	MPC · JPL
874162	2020 OT_{38}	—	July 17, 2020	Haleakala	Pan-STARRS 1	·	1.2 km	MPC · JPL
874163	2020 OJ_{39}	—	July 18, 2020	Haleakala	Pan-STARRS 1	GAL	1.3 km	MPC · JPL
874164	2020 OY_{39}	—	July 18, 2020	Haleakala	Pan-STARRS 1	·	1.4 km	MPC · JPL
874165	2020 OX_{40}	—	July 22, 2020	Haleakala	Pan-STARRS 2	·	920 m	MPC · JPL
874166	2020 ON_{43}	—	July 18, 2020	Haleakala	Pan-STARRS 1	·	440 m	MPC · JPL
874167	2020 OX_{44}	—	July 25, 2020	Haleakala	Pan-STARRS 1	·	2.2 km	MPC · JPL
874168	2020 OM_{45}	—	July 30, 2020	Mount Lemmon	Mount Lemmon Survey	H	260 m	MPC · JPL
874169	2020 OW_{48}	—	July 30, 2020	Haleakala	Pan-STARRS 1	·	660 m	MPC · JPL
874170	2020 OY_{57}	—	April 28, 2014	Cerro Tololo	DECam	·	1.5 km	MPC · JPL
874171	2020 OL_{63}	—	October 16, 2009	Mount Lemmon	Mount Lemmon Survey	·	790 m	MPC · JPL
874172	2020 OF_{64}	—	July 29, 2020	Mount Lemmon	Mount Lemmon Survey	·	2.2 km	MPC · JPL
874173	2020 OZ_{64}	—	July 29, 2020	Mount Lemmon	Mount Lemmon Survey	H	270 m	MPC · JPL
874174	2020 OZ_{65}	—	April 28, 2014	Cerro Tololo	DECam	·	1.4 km	MPC · JPL
874175	2020 OZ_{72}	—	July 22, 2020	Haleakala	Pan-STARRS 1	H	310 m	MPC · JPL
874176	2020 OL_{79}	—	July 20, 2020	Haleakala	Pan-STARRS 1	AGN	910 m	MPC · JPL
874177	2020 OS_{80}	—	July 25, 2020	Haleakala	Pan-STARRS 1	·	2.1 km	MPC · JPL
874178	2020 OU_{87}	—	July 20, 2020	Haleakala	Pan-STARRS 1	·	1.3 km	MPC · JPL
874179	2020 OB_{89}	—	September 4, 2011	Haleakala	Pan-STARRS 1	·	1.1 km	MPC · JPL
874180	2020 OQ_{94}	—	July 18, 2020	Haleakala	Pan-STARRS 1	·	1.1 km	MPC · JPL
874181	2020 OE_{95}	—	July 28, 2020	Haleakala	Pan-STARRS 1	·	1.3 km	MPC · JPL
874182	2020 OZ_{96}	—	July 17, 2020	Haleakala	Pan-STARRS 1	·	1.4 km	MPC · JPL
874183	2020 OF_{104}	—	July 26, 2020	Mount Lemmon	Mount Lemmon Survey	·	1.1 km	MPC · JPL
874184	2020 OB_{106}	—	July 31, 2020	Haleakala	Pan-STARRS 1	H	400 m	MPC · JPL
874185	2020 OM_{106}	—	May 20, 2015	Cerro Tololo	DECam	·	940 m	MPC · JPL
874186	2020 OC_{108}	—	July 18, 2020	Haleakala	Pan-STARRS 1	·	1.5 km	MPC · JPL
874187	2020 OS_{108}	—	July 18, 2020	Haleakala	Pan-STARRS 1	EOS	1.5 km	MPC · JPL
874188	2020 OU_{110}	—	July 18, 2020	Haleakala	Pan-STARRS 2	·	1.4 km	MPC · JPL
874189	2020 OZ_{115}	—	July 23, 2020	Haleakala	Pan-STARRS 1	·	1.5 km	MPC · JPL
874190	2020 OT_{117}	—	March 4, 2014	Cerro Tololo	High Cadence Transient Survey	·	1.3 km	MPC · JPL
874191	2020 ON_{130}	—	February 7, 2013	Cerro Tololo-DECam	DECam	·	2.2 km	MPC · JPL
874192	2020 OE_{142}	—	November 25, 2006	Mount Lemmon	Mount Lemmon Survey	·	1.9 km	MPC · JPL
874193	2020 OE_{143}	—	July 20, 2020	Haleakala	Pan-STARRS 1	·	1.2 km	MPC · JPL
874194	2020 PD_{8}	—	August 3, 2016	Haleakala	Pan-STARRS 1	·	930 m	MPC · JPL
874195	2020 PM_{8}	—	October 26, 2016	Mount Lemmon	Mount Lemmon Survey	EUN	840 m	MPC · JPL
874196	2020 PP_{10}	—	August 14, 2020	Haleakala	Pan-STARRS 2	·	2.2 km	MPC · JPL
874197	2020 PS_{10}	—	October 22, 2016	Mount Lemmon	Mount Lemmon Survey	·	1.4 km	MPC · JPL
874198	2020 PZ_{13}	—	October 6, 2001	Palomar Mountain	NEAT	PHO	660 m	MPC · JPL
874199	2020 PB_{17}	—	August 12, 2020	Haleakala	Pan-STARRS 1	·	1.3 km	MPC · JPL
874200	2020 PK_{17}	—	August 14, 2020	Haleakala	Pan-STARRS 1	·	1.5 km	MPC · JPL

== 874201–874300 ==
back to top

Designation			Discovery			Properties		Ref
Permanent	Provisional	Named after	Date	Site	Discoverer(s)	Category	Diam.	Ref
874201	2020 PW_{17}	—	August 14, 2020	Haleakala	Pan-STARRS 1	·	630 m	MPC · JPL
874202	2020 PU_{21}	—	August 13, 2020	Haleakala	Pan-STARRS 1	·	720 m	MPC · JPL
874203	2020 PW_{21}	—	August 13, 2020	Haleakala	Pan-STARRS 2	·	1.5 km	MPC · JPL
874204	2020 PA_{22}	—	August 14, 2020	Haleakala	Pan-STARRS 1	EOS	1.5 km	MPC · JPL
874205	2020 PC_{22}	—	August 14, 2020	Haleakala	Pan-STARRS 1	·	1.9 km	MPC · JPL
874206	2020 PU_{22}	—	February 2, 2013	Cerro Tololo-DECam	DECam	NAE	1.7 km	MPC · JPL
874207	2020 PP_{25}	—	August 14, 2020	Mount Lemmon	Mount Lemmon Survey	·	960 m	MPC · JPL
874208	2020 PJ_{26}	—	May 22, 2015	Haleakala	Pan-STARRS 1	·	1.1 km	MPC · JPL
874209	2020 PL_{27}	—	August 14, 2020	Haleakala	Pan-STARRS 1	EOS	1.4 km	MPC · JPL
874210	2020 PN_{50}	—	August 13, 2020	Haleakala	Pan-STARRS 1	·	600 m	MPC · JPL
874211	2020 PC_{51}	—	September 6, 2015	Haleakala	Pan-STARRS 1	KOR	990 m	MPC · JPL
874212	2020 PC_{54}	—	August 14, 2020	Haleakala	Pan-STARRS 1	L4	5.9 km	MPC · JPL
874213	2020 PX_{54}	—	May 1, 2016	Cerro Tololo	DECam	L4	5.5 km	MPC · JPL
874214	2020 PA_{64}	—	April 4, 2019	Haleakala	Pan-STARRS 1	·	1.3 km	MPC · JPL
874215	2020 PZ_{69}	—	August 14, 2020	Haleakala	Pan-STARRS 1	L4	5.1 km	MPC · JPL
874216	2020 PZ_{73}	—	August 14, 2020	Haleakala	Pan-STARRS 1	·	1.1 km	MPC · JPL
874217	2020 PG_{74}	—	August 15, 2020	Haleakala	Pan-STARRS 1	·	1.9 km	MPC · JPL
874218	2020 PJ_{74}	—	August 15, 2020	Haleakala	Pan-STARRS 1	·	1.6 km	MPC · JPL
874219	2020 PC_{75}	—	August 13, 2020	Haleakala	Pan-STARRS 1	L4	5.9 km	MPC · JPL
874220	2020 PB_{76}	—	August 14, 2020	Haleakala	Pan-STARRS 1	EOS	1.4 km	MPC · JPL
874221	2020 PG_{76}	—	March 26, 2007	Mount Lemmon	Mount Lemmon Survey	EMA	2.1 km	MPC · JPL
874222	2020 PS_{76}	—	June 11, 2015	Haleakala	Pan-STARRS 1	·	1.3 km	MPC · JPL
874223	2020 PC_{78}	—	April 18, 2015	Cerro Tololo	DECam	V	440 m	MPC · JPL
874224	2020 PF_{78}	—	June 9, 2012	Mount Lemmon	Mount Lemmon Survey	·	930 m	MPC · JPL
874225	2020 PQ_{80}	—	August 12, 2020	Haleakala	Pan-STARRS 1	·	1.4 km	MPC · JPL
874226	2020 PA_{81}	—	August 10, 2020	Haleakala	Pan-STARRS 1	·	1.1 km	MPC · JPL
874227	2020 PC_{81}	—	August 15, 2020	Haleakala	Pan-STARRS 2	·	1.3 km	MPC · JPL
874228	2020 PM_{81}	—	November 24, 2016	Kitt Peak	Spacewatch	·	1.3 km	MPC · JPL
874229	2020 PP_{81}	—	August 14, 2020	Haleakala	Pan-STARRS 1	·	2.3 km	MPC · JPL
874230	2020 PD_{91}	—	January 12, 2018	Haleakala	Pan-STARRS 1	·	1.4 km	MPC · JPL
874231	2020 PW_{93}	—	August 13, 2020	Haleakala	Pan-STARRS 1	·	1.8 km	MPC · JPL
874232	2020 PT_{110}	—	October 25, 2016	Haleakala	Pan-STARRS 1	·	1.4 km	MPC · JPL
874233	2020 PN_{123}	—	August 13, 2020	Haleakala	Pan-STARRS 1	L4	5.6 km	MPC · JPL
874234	2020 PX_{124}	—	October 13, 2015	Haleakala	Pan-STARRS 1	·	1.8 km	MPC · JPL
874235	2020 QK_{4}	—	August 18, 2020	Haleakala	Pan-STARRS 1	H	220 m	MPC · JPL
874236	2020 QU_{7}	—	November 8, 2016	Haleakala	Pan-STARRS 1	·	900 m	MPC · JPL
874237	2020 QA_{9}	—	May 1, 2019	Haleakala	Pan-STARRS 1	·	960 m	MPC · JPL
874238	2020 QA_{10}	—	September 30, 2003	Kitt Peak	Spacewatch	(5)	740 m	MPC · JPL
874239	2020 QJ_{14}	—	August 18, 2020	Mount Lemmon	Mount Lemmon Survey	·	840 m	MPC · JPL
874240	2020 QF_{15}	—	August 22, 2020	Haleakala	Pan-STARRS 2	·	720 m	MPC · JPL
874241	2020 QT_{15}	—	August 18, 2020	Haleakala	Pan-STARRS 1	EOS	1.3 km	MPC · JPL
874242	2020 QF_{16}	—	August 23, 2020	Haleakala	Pan-STARRS 1	·	2.2 km	MPC · JPL
874243	2020 QN_{22}	—	August 18, 2020	Haleakala	Pan-STARRS 1	·	1.3 km	MPC · JPL
874244	2020 QY_{25}	—	October 23, 2016	Mount Lemmon	Mount Lemmon Survey	(5)	1.0 km	MPC · JPL
874245	2020 QY_{26}	—	August 18, 2020	Haleakala	Pan-STARRS 1	·	2.0 km	MPC · JPL
874246	2020 QB_{27}	—	August 19, 2020	Haleakala	Pan-STARRS 1	·	1.6 km	MPC · JPL
874247	2020 QG_{28}	—	August 28, 2020	Mount Lemmon	Mount Lemmon Survey	H	280 m	MPC · JPL
874248	2020 QT_{29}	—	August 18, 2020	Haleakala	Pan-STARRS 1	·	1.7 km	MPC · JPL
874249	2020 QU_{31}	—	September 29, 2009	Mount Lemmon	Mount Lemmon Survey	·	690 m	MPC · JPL
874250	2020 QY_{31}	—	August 2, 2011	Haleakala	Pan-STARRS 1	·	1.3 km	MPC · JPL
874251	2020 QN_{46}	—	October 4, 2014	Mount Lemmon	Mount Lemmon Survey	·	2.5 km	MPC · JPL
874252	2020 QR_{46}	—	March 12, 2007	Mount Lemmon	Mount Lemmon Survey	·	2.3 km	MPC · JPL
874253	2020 QP_{51}	—	August 18, 2020	Haleakala	Pan-STARRS 1	·	2.0 km	MPC · JPL
874254	2020 QS_{53}	—	April 28, 2014	Cerro Tololo	DECam	·	1.4 km	MPC · JPL
874255	2020 QG_{61}	—	August 23, 2020	Haleakala	Pan-STARRS 1	·	760 m	MPC · JPL
874256	2020 QA_{65}	—	August 22, 2020	Haleakala	Pan-STARRS 1	L4 · ERY	5.2 km	MPC · JPL
874257	2020 QB_{69}	—	March 5, 2013	Mount Lemmon	Mount Lemmon Survey	·	740 m	MPC · JPL
874258	2020 QD_{69}	—	April 15, 2010	Kitt Peak	Spacewatch	·	1.2 km	MPC · JPL
874259	2020 QH_{72}	—	August 18, 2020	Haleakala	Pan-STARRS 1	·	1.8 km	MPC · JPL
874260	2020 QV_{77}	—	August 23, 2020	Haleakala	Pan-STARRS 1	EOS	1.4 km	MPC · JPL
874261	2020 QC_{80}	—	August 19, 2020	Haleakala	Pan-STARRS 1	EOS	1.4 km	MPC · JPL
874262	2020 QC_{83}	—	August 23, 2020	Haleakala	Pan-STARRS 1	·	1.5 km	MPC · JPL
874263	2020 QW_{85}	—	August 18, 2020	Haleakala	Pan-STARRS 1	·	1.5 km	MPC · JPL
874264	2020 QL_{86}	—	August 23, 2020	Haleakala	Pan-STARRS 1	·	1.4 km	MPC · JPL
874265	2020 QV_{87}	—	August 23, 2020	Haleakala	Pan-STARRS 1	·	2.1 km	MPC · JPL
874266	2020 QW_{92}	—	August 19, 2020	Haleakala	Pan-STARRS 1	·	2.0 km	MPC · JPL
874267	2020 QZ_{94}	—	August 19, 2020	Haleakala	Pan-STARRS 1	·	2.4 km	MPC · JPL
874268	2020 QS_{95}	—	August 19, 2020	Haleakala	Pan-STARRS 1	EUN	740 m	MPC · JPL
874269	2020 QV_{104}	—	August 18, 2020	Mount Lemmon	Mount Lemmon Survey	·	650 m	MPC · JPL
874270	2020 QP_{106}	—	March 10, 2018	Haleakala	Pan-STARRS 1	·	1.3 km	MPC · JPL
874271	2020 QW_{110}	—	March 20, 2012	Haleakala	Pan-STARRS 1	·	2.1 km	MPC · JPL
874272	2020 RU	—	September 4, 2020	Haleakala	Pan-STARRS 1	T_{j} (2.89) · AMO	530 m	MPC · JPL
874273	2020 RN_{15}	—	December 29, 2011	Mount Lemmon	Mount Lemmon Survey	·	1.6 km	MPC · JPL
874274	2020 RM_{24}	—	September 10, 2020	Mount Lemmon	Mount Lemmon Survey	·	1.4 km	MPC · JPL
874275	2020 RU_{24}	—	June 8, 2019	Haleakala	Pan-STARRS 1	EOS	1.2 km	MPC · JPL
874276	2020 RG_{26}	—	September 9, 2020	Haleakala	Pan-STARRS 1	KOR	1.1 km	MPC · JPL
874277	2020 RV_{26}	—	September 13, 2020	Haleakala	Pan-STARRS 2	·	2.6 km	MPC · JPL
874278	2020 RY_{26}	—	September 13, 2020	Haleakala	Pan-STARRS 2	·	1.5 km	MPC · JPL
874279	2020 RD_{27}	—	September 14, 2020	Haleakala	Pan-STARRS 1	·	1.6 km	MPC · JPL
874280	2020 RK_{27}	—	September 15, 2020	Mount Lemmon	Mount Lemmon Survey	EOS	1.3 km	MPC · JPL
874281	2020 RW_{27}	—	September 10, 2020	Mount Lemmon	Mount Lemmon Survey	EOS	1.2 km	MPC · JPL
874282	2020 RX_{27}	—	September 10, 2020	Mount Lemmon	Mount Lemmon Survey	TIR	2.1 km	MPC · JPL
874283	2020 RY_{27}	—	September 10, 2020	Mount Lemmon	Mount Lemmon Survey	·	1.5 km	MPC · JPL
874284	2020 RJ_{28}	—	September 23, 2015	Haleakala	Pan-STARRS 1	·	1.5 km	MPC · JPL
874285	2020 RE_{33}	—	January 10, 2013	Haleakala	Pan-STARRS 1	AGN	840 m	MPC · JPL
874286	2020 RV_{35}	—	November 10, 2016	Haleakala	Pan-STARRS 1	·	1.4 km	MPC · JPL
874287	2020 RA_{37}	—	September 10, 2020	Haleakala	Pan-STARRS 1	HNS	930 m	MPC · JPL
874288	2020 RT_{39}	—	April 28, 2014	Cerro Tololo	DECam	·	1.4 km	MPC · JPL
874289	2020 RL_{46}	—	March 8, 2008	Mount Lemmon	Mount Lemmon Survey	·	1.6 km	MPC · JPL
874290	2020 RC_{48}	—	October 23, 2011	Haleakala	Pan-STARRS 1	DOR	1.6 km	MPC · JPL
874291	2020 RF_{49}	—	September 12, 2020	Haleakala	Pan-STARRS 1	·	2.0 km	MPC · JPL
874292	2020 RM_{49}	—	May 20, 2015	Cerro Tololo	DECam	·	770 m	MPC · JPL
874293	2020 RK_{51}	—	December 2, 2010	Mount Lemmon	Mount Lemmon Survey	L4	5.3 km	MPC · JPL
874294	2020 RM_{51}	—	September 12, 2020	Haleakala	Pan-STARRS 1	L4	5.8 km	MPC · JPL
874295	2020 RQ_{53}	—	September 13, 2020	Haleakala	Pan-STARRS 1	·	1.1 km	MPC · JPL
874296	2020 RO_{54}	—	April 23, 2014	Cerro Tololo	DECam	·	1.3 km	MPC · JPL
874297	2020 RN_{55}	—	September 13, 2020	Haleakala	Pan-STARRS 1	·	1.5 km	MPC · JPL
874298	2020 RY_{57}	—	September 13, 2020	Haleakala	Pan-STARRS 2	VER	2.0 km	MPC · JPL
874299	2020 RE_{58}	—	September 14, 2020	Haleakala	Pan-STARRS 1	·	1.1 km	MPC · JPL
874300	2020 RJ_{65}	—	September 6, 2008	Mount Lemmon	Mount Lemmon Survey	L4	6.1 km	MPC · JPL

== 874301–874400 ==
back to top

Designation			Discovery			Properties		Ref
Permanent	Provisional	Named after	Date	Site	Discoverer(s)	Category	Diam.	Ref
874301	2020 RF_{80}	—	February 13, 2008	Kitt Peak	Spacewatch	·	1.6 km	MPC · JPL
874302	2020 RY_{80}	—	November 13, 2007	Mount Lemmon	Mount Lemmon Survey	·	500 m	MPC · JPL
874303	2020 RE_{82}	—	May 1, 2019	Haleakala	Pan-STARRS 1	·	1.2 km	MPC · JPL
874304	2020 RD_{83}	—	September 12, 2020	Haleakala	Pan-STARRS 1	H	360 m	MPC · JPL
874305	2020 RA_{86}	—	September 14, 2020	Haleakala	Pan-STARRS 2	·	1.8 km	MPC · JPL
874306	2020 RU_{86}	—	September 14, 2020	Haleakala	Pan-STARRS 1	L4	5.7 km	MPC · JPL
874307	2020 RS_{91}	—	September 10, 2020	Haleakala	Pan-STARRS 1	EOS	1.2 km	MPC · JPL
874308	2020 RF_{97}	—	September 13, 2020	Haleakala	Pan-STARRS 1	·	1.8 km	MPC · JPL
874309	2020 RP_{98}	—	February 27, 2012	Haleakala	Pan-STARRS 1	·	1.9 km	MPC · JPL
874310	2020 RH_{103}	—	September 14, 2020	Haleakala	Pan-STARRS 1	EOS	1.2 km	MPC · JPL
874311	2020 RJ_{103}	—	September 14, 2020	Haleakala	Pan-STARRS 1	·	2.3 km	MPC · JPL
874312	2020 RQ_{107}	—	April 18, 2015	Cerro Tololo	DECam	L4 · HEK	6.2 km	MPC · JPL
874313	2020 RR_{110}	—	April 18, 2015	Cerro Tololo	DECam	L4	4.7 km	MPC · JPL
874314	2020 RA_{112}	—	September 10, 2020	Mount Lemmon	Mount Lemmon Survey	·	1.4 km	MPC · JPL
874315	2020 RE_{113}	—	May 23, 2014	Haleakala	Pan-STARRS 1	·	1.3 km	MPC · JPL
874316	2020 RH_{117}	—	November 6, 2016	Mount Lemmon	Mount Lemmon Survey	·	1.4 km	MPC · JPL
874317	2020 RK_{118}	—	May 21, 2015	Cerro Tololo	DECam	L4	5.6 km	MPC · JPL
874318	2020 RH_{119}	—	April 3, 2016	Haleakala	Pan-STARRS 1	L4	5.7 km	MPC · JPL
874319	2020 RL_{147}	—	April 5, 2014	Haleakala	Pan-STARRS 1	·	1.7 km	MPC · JPL
874320	2020 RO_{164}	—	September 12, 2020	Haleakala	Pan-STARRS 1	·	1.6 km	MPC · JPL
874321	2020 RX_{168}	—	September 12, 2020	Haleakala	Pan-STARRS 1	LIX	2.3 km	MPC · JPL
874322	2020 RO_{169}	—	September 10, 2020	Mount Lemmon	Mount Lemmon Survey	·	1.4 km	MPC · JPL
874323	2020 RR_{169}	—	March 16, 2018	Mount Lemmon	Mount Lemmon Survey	·	2.2 km	MPC · JPL
874324	2020 SS_{9}	—	September 16, 2020	Haleakala	Pan-STARRS 1	T_{j} (2.94)	2.9 km	MPC · JPL
874325	2020 SM_{14}	—	September 19, 2020	Haleakala	Pan-STARRS 1	·	2.1 km	MPC · JPL
874326	2020 SN_{15}	—	September 19, 2020	Haleakala	Pan-STARRS 1	·	1.6 km	MPC · JPL
874327	2020 SU_{16}	—	November 20, 2015	Mount Lemmon	Mount Lemmon Survey	·	1.6 km	MPC · JPL
874328	2020 SK_{19}	—	October 27, 2005	Kitt Peak	Spacewatch	·	810 m	MPC · JPL
874329	2020 SR_{21}	—	October 30, 2005	Kitt Peak	Spacewatch	·	1.5 km	MPC · JPL
874330	2020 SF_{22}	—	August 3, 2014	Haleakala	Pan-STARRS 1	·	1.8 km	MPC · JPL
874331	2020 SF_{23}	—	October 10, 2015	Haleakala	Pan-STARRS 1	·	1.3 km	MPC · JPL
874332	2020 SA_{24}	—	August 27, 2001	Kitt Peak	Spacewatch	·	1.2 km	MPC · JPL
874333	2020 SB_{24}	—	September 29, 2005	Mount Lemmon	Mount Lemmon Survey	MAS	430 m	MPC · JPL
874334	2020 SX_{25}	—	August 20, 2014	Haleakala	Pan-STARRS 1	·	1.7 km	MPC · JPL
874335	2020 SB_{26}	—	November 2, 2015	Mount Lemmon	Mount Lemmon Survey	·	2.1 km	MPC · JPL
874336	2020 SU_{26}	—	September 13, 1998	Kitt Peak	Spacewatch	MAS	420 m	MPC · JPL
874337	2020 SK_{31}	—	September 17, 2020	Haleakala	Pan-STARRS 1	·	2.4 km	MPC · JPL
874338	2020 SJ_{34}	—	September 27, 2020	Haleakala	Pan-STARRS 1	·	1.9 km	MPC · JPL
874339	2020 SV_{34}	—	September 20, 2020	Mount Lemmon	Mount Lemmon Survey	KOR	1.1 km	MPC · JPL
874340	2020 SJ_{35}	—	September 18, 2020	Mount Lemmon	Mount Lemmon Survey	·	770 m	MPC · JPL
874341	2020 SO_{35}	—	April 24, 2014	Cerro Tololo	DECam	·	1.1 km	MPC · JPL
874342	2020 SC_{36}	—	September 17, 2020	Haleakala	Pan-STARRS 1	EOS	1.3 km	MPC · JPL
874343	2020 SR_{36}	—	September 20, 2020	Mount Lemmon	Mount Lemmon Survey	HOF	1.9 km	MPC · JPL
874344	2020 SY_{36}	—	September 23, 2020	Mount Lemmon	Mount Lemmon Survey	H	300 m	MPC · JPL
874345	2020 SJ_{37}	—	September 17, 2020	Haleakala	Pan-STARRS 1	·	820 m	MPC · JPL
874346	2020 SO_{37}	—	September 28, 2020	Mount Lemmon	Mount Lemmon Survey	·	1.4 km	MPC · JPL
874347	2020 ST_{37}	—	September 17, 2020	Haleakala	Pan-STARRS 1	·	2.3 km	MPC · JPL
874348	2020 SB_{38}	—	September 17, 2020	Haleakala	Pan-STARRS 1	·	2.2 km	MPC · JPL
874349	2020 SB_{39}	—	September 26, 2020	Mount Lemmon	Mount Lemmon Survey	·	710 m	MPC · JPL
874350	2020 SU_{40}	—	September 26, 2020	Mount Lemmon	Mount Lemmon Survey	KON	1.9 km	MPC · JPL
874351	2020 SA_{59}	—	September 17, 2020	Haleakala	Pan-STARRS 1	·	1.5 km	MPC · JPL
874352	2020 SM_{59}	—	February 16, 2015	Haleakala	Pan-STARRS 1	V	410 m	MPC · JPL
874353	2020 SJ_{61}	—	May 20, 2014	Haleakala	Pan-STARRS 1	·	1.3 km	MPC · JPL
874354	2020 SM_{61}	—	October 20, 2016	Mount Lemmon	Mount Lemmon Survey	·	810 m	MPC · JPL
874355	2020 SV_{65}	—	September 27, 2020	Haleakala	Pan-STARRS 1	·	1.4 km	MPC · JPL
874356	2020 SM_{67}	—	May 23, 2014	Haleakala	Pan-STARRS 1	·	1.3 km	MPC · JPL
874357	2020 SB_{68}	—	November 1, 2007	Kitt Peak	Spacewatch	·	430 m	MPC · JPL
874358	2020 SQ_{69}	—	September 20, 2020	Mount Lemmon	Mount Lemmon Survey	·	2.2 km	MPC · JPL
874359	2020 ST_{70}	—	September 27, 2020	Mount Lemmon	Mount Lemmon Survey	L4	6.4 km	MPC · JPL
874360	2020 SY_{72}	—	October 8, 2015	Haleakala	Pan-STARRS 1	·	1.7 km	MPC · JPL
874361	2020 SJ_{78}	—	May 6, 2014	Haleakala	Pan-STARRS 1	·	1.6 km	MPC · JPL
874362	2020 SP_{80}	—	September 23, 2020	Haleakala	Pan-STARRS 1	·	1.5 km	MPC · JPL
874363	2020 SJ_{82}	—	September 17, 2020	Haleakala	Pan-STARRS 1	·	2.0 km	MPC · JPL
874364	2020 SS_{82}	—	September 23, 2015	Haleakala	Pan-STARRS 1	·	1.4 km	MPC · JPL
874365	2020 SJ_{83}	—	April 18, 2015	Cerro Tololo	DECam	L4	6.5 km	MPC · JPL
874366	2020 SO_{83}	—	September 16, 2020	Haleakala	Pan-STARRS 1	·	1.5 km	MPC · JPL
874367	2020 SW_{85}	—	September 17, 2020	Haleakala	Pan-STARRS 1	·	2.0 km	MPC · JPL
874368	2020 SJ_{86}	—	September 17, 2020	Haleakala	Pan-STARRS 1	·	1.5 km	MPC · JPL
874369	2020 SK_{87}	—	January 27, 2012	Mount Lemmon	Mount Lemmon Survey	·	1.5 km	MPC · JPL
874370	2020 SS_{87}	—	September 26, 2020	Haleakala	Pan-STARRS 1	·	2.3 km	MPC · JPL
874371	2020 SS_{89}	—	November 24, 2003	Kitt Peak	Spacewatch	·	2.6 km	MPC · JPL
874372	2020 SS_{93}	—	September 23, 2020	Haleakala	Pan-STARRS 1	·	1.5 km	MPC · JPL
874373	2020 SE_{95}	—	November 27, 2010	Mount Lemmon	Mount Lemmon Survey	·	2.2 km	MPC · JPL
874374	2020 ST_{99}	—	September 20, 2020	Mount Lemmon	Mount Lemmon Survey	·	1.9 km	MPC · JPL
874375	2020 SG_{100}	—	September 17, 2020	Haleakala	Pan-STARRS 1	·	1.9 km	MPC · JPL
874376	2020 SN_{100}	—	September 17, 2020	Haleakala	Pan-STARRS 1	·	1.4 km	MPC · JPL
874377	2020 SR_{100}	—	September 27, 2020	Haleakala	Pan-STARRS 1	·	1.9 km	MPC · JPL
874378	2020 SX_{106}	—	September 16, 2020	Haleakala	Pan-STARRS 1	·	2.3 km	MPC · JPL
874379	2020 SL_{124}	—	August 22, 2014	Haleakala	Pan-STARRS 1	·	2.1 km	MPC · JPL
874380	2020 SN_{125}	—	August 27, 2014	Haleakala	Pan-STARRS 1	·	2.0 km	MPC · JPL
874381	2020 TH_{9}	—	July 14, 2013	Haleakala	Pan-STARRS 1	·	390 m	MPC · JPL
874382	2020 TF_{11}	—	September 21, 2009	Kitt Peak	Spacewatch	·	1.5 km	MPC · JPL
874383	2020 TK_{11}	—	January 4, 2011	Mount Lemmon	Mount Lemmon Survey	·	950 m	MPC · JPL
874384	2020 TA_{12}	—	October 8, 2020	Haleakala	Pan-STARRS 1	·	1.4 km	MPC · JPL
874385	2020 TZ_{12}	—	November 1, 2014	Mount Lemmon	Mount Lemmon Survey	·	2.7 km	MPC · JPL
874386	2020 TG_{13}	—	October 8, 2020	Mount Lemmon	Mount Lemmon Survey	·	2.2 km	MPC · JPL
874387	2020 TO_{13}	—	February 18, 2010	Kitt Peak	Spacewatch	·	1.2 km	MPC · JPL
874388	2020 TG_{14}	—	October 22, 2003	Sacramento Peak	SDSS	·	2.1 km	MPC · JPL
874389	2020 TR_{14}	—	October 13, 2010	Mount Lemmon	Mount Lemmon Survey	·	1.2 km	MPC · JPL
874390	2020 TN_{16}	—	December 3, 2015	Mount Lemmon	Mount Lemmon Survey	·	1.7 km	MPC · JPL
874391	2020 TW_{17}	—	July 12, 2015	Haleakala	Pan-STARRS 1	NEM	1.4 km	MPC · JPL
874392	2020 TZ_{17}	—	July 29, 2014	Haleakala	Pan-STARRS 1	·	1.8 km	MPC · JPL
874393	2020 TG_{18}	—	March 21, 2017	Haleakala	Pan-STARRS 1	·	2.4 km	MPC · JPL
874394	2020 TU_{19}	—	March 26, 2017	Haleakala	Pan-STARRS 1	·	1.8 km	MPC · JPL
874395	2020 TP_{21}	—	December 9, 2015	Mount Lemmon	Mount Lemmon Survey	·	1.7 km	MPC · JPL
874396	2020 TM_{22}	—	October 14, 2020	Haleakala	Pan-STARRS 2	H	310 m	MPC · JPL
874397	2020 TS_{22}	—	August 28, 2016	Mount Lemmon	Mount Lemmon Survey	·	930 m	MPC · JPL
874398	2020 TJ_{23}	—	October 15, 2020	Haleakala	Pan-STARRS 1	·	1.6 km	MPC · JPL
874399	2020 TK_{24}	—	October 15, 2020	Haleakala	Pan-STARRS 1	·	2.1 km	MPC · JPL
874400	2020 TW_{24}	—	October 15, 2020	Haleakala	Pan-STARRS 1	·	1.2 km	MPC · JPL

== 874401–874500 ==
back to top

Designation			Discovery			Properties		Ref
Permanent	Provisional	Named after	Date	Site	Discoverer(s)	Category	Diam.	Ref
874401	2020 TA_{25}	—	October 11, 2020	Haleakala	Pan-STARRS 2	·	1.2 km	MPC · JPL
874402	2020 TS_{26}	—	October 11, 2020	Mount Lemmon	Mount Lemmon Survey	·	1.2 km	MPC · JPL
874403	2020 TK_{27}	—	October 15, 2020	Haleakala	Pan-STARRS 1	·	2.3 km	MPC · JPL
874404	2020 TF_{28}	—	October 13, 2006	Kitt Peak	Spacewatch	·	1.6 km	MPC · JPL
874405	2020 TP_{28}	—	October 14, 2020	Haleakala	Pan-STARRS 1	ELF	2.6 km	MPC · JPL
874406	2020 TE_{29}	—	April 28, 2014	Cerro Tololo	DECam	·	1.3 km	MPC · JPL
874407	2020 TB_{32}	—	May 23, 2014	Haleakala	Pan-STARRS 1	·	1.5 km	MPC · JPL
874408	2020 TH_{33}	—	October 15, 2020	Haleakala	Pan-STARRS 1	URS	2.1 km	MPC · JPL
874409	2020 TR_{38}	—	October 19, 2011	Kitt Peak	Spacewatch	HOF	1.9 km	MPC · JPL
874410	2020 TT_{39}	—	October 10, 2020	Haleakala	Pan-STARRS 1	H	330 m	MPC · JPL
874411	2020 TA_{57}	—	January 28, 2017	Haleakala	Pan-STARRS 1	·	1.3 km	MPC · JPL
874412	2020 TB_{58}	—	October 11, 2020	Haleakala	Pan-STARRS 2	EOS	1.1 km	MPC · JPL
874413	2020 TX_{58}	—	May 30, 2019	Haleakala	Pan-STARRS 1	·	2.1 km	MPC · JPL
874414	2020 TG_{60}	—	January 30, 2011	Mount Lemmon	Mount Lemmon Survey	·	1.7 km	MPC · JPL
874415	2020 TW_{62}	—	August 13, 2015	Haleakala	Pan-STARRS 1	·	1.3 km	MPC · JPL
874416	2020 TM_{66}	—	October 7, 2020	Mount Lemmon	Mount Lemmon Survey	·	1.7 km	MPC · JPL
874417	2020 TN_{66}	—	September 7, 2008	Mount Lemmon	Mount Lemmon Survey	VER	1.9 km	MPC · JPL
874418	2020 TZ_{66}	—	September 19, 1998	Sacramento Peak	SDSS	·	1.4 km	MPC · JPL
874419	2020 TB_{68}	—	October 13, 2020	Mount Nanshan	W. Gao, X. Gao	·	2.3 km	MPC · JPL
874420	2020 TM_{68}	—	October 15, 2020	Haleakala	Pan-STARRS 1	·	2.2 km	MPC · JPL
874421	2020 TQ_{69}	—	December 16, 2003	Kitt Peak	Spacewatch	HNS	860 m	MPC · JPL
874422	2020 TF_{72}	—	October 15, 2020	Haleakala	Pan-STARRS 1	EOS	1.4 km	MPC · JPL
874423	2020 TC_{76}	—	April 18, 2015	Cerro Tololo	DECam	L4	5.8 km	MPC · JPL
874424	2020 TQ_{78}	—	October 15, 2020	Mount Lemmon	Mount Lemmon Survey	·	2.0 km	MPC · JPL
874425	2020 TA_{79}	—	October 15, 2020	Haleakala	Pan-STARRS 1	·	2.1 km	MPC · JPL
874426	2020 TC_{80}	—	October 14, 2020	Haleakala	Pan-STARRS 1	·	1.8 km	MPC · JPL
874427	2020 TT_{80}	—	August 27, 2014	Haleakala	Pan-STARRS 1	·	1.9 km	MPC · JPL
874428	2020 TM_{90}	—	February 12, 2008	Mount Lemmon	Mount Lemmon Survey	H	320 m	MPC · JPL
874429	2020 TG_{91}	—	October 8, 2020	Mount Lemmon	Mount Lemmon Survey	·	2.4 km	MPC · JPL
874430	2020 TR_{92}	—	October 15, 2020	Mount Lemmon	Mount Lemmon Survey	·	2.0 km	MPC · JPL
874431	2020 TH_{102}	—	October 7, 2020	Mount Lemmon	Mount Lemmon Survey	·	2.4 km	MPC · JPL
874432	2020 UF_{8}	—	January 23, 2018	Mount Lemmon	Mount Lemmon Survey	·	520 m	MPC · JPL
874433	2020 UA_{9}	—	October 16, 2020	Haleakala	Pan-STARRS 1	·	1.3 km	MPC · JPL
874434	2020 UY_{9}	—	October 23, 2020	Mount Lemmon	Mount Lemmon Survey	·	1.9 km	MPC · JPL
874435	2020 UF_{10}	—	May 20, 2015	Cerro Tololo	DECam	·	660 m	MPC · JPL
874436	2020 UN_{10}	—	October 23, 2020	Mount Lemmon	Mount Lemmon Survey	·	830 m	MPC · JPL
874437	2020 UD_{12}	—	October 22, 2020	Haleakala	Pan-STARRS 2	·	1.4 km	MPC · JPL
874438	2020 UU_{13}	—	April 23, 2014	Cerro Tololo	DECam	·	750 m	MPC · JPL
874439	2020 UN_{16}	—	October 20, 2020	Haleakala	Pan-STARRS 1	EOS	1.3 km	MPC · JPL
874440	2020 UG_{17}	—	October 22, 2020	Haleakala	Pan-STARRS 1	EOS	1.4 km	MPC · JPL
874441	2020 UJ_{35}	—	October 23, 2020	Haleakala	Pan-STARRS 1	·	1.6 km	MPC · JPL
874442	2020 UC_{38}	—	January 17, 2013	Haleakala	Pan-STARRS 1	·	730 m	MPC · JPL
874443	2020 UO_{51}	—	October 16, 2020	Mount Lemmon	Mount Lemmon Survey	·	1.4 km	MPC · JPL
874444	2020 UU_{51}	—	April 29, 2014	Haleakala	Pan-STARRS 1	·	1.0 km	MPC · JPL
874445	2020 UB_{52}	—	October 23, 2020	Haleakala	Pan-STARRS 2	·	1.1 km	MPC · JPL
874446	2020 UR_{53}	—	October 23, 2020	Mount Lemmon	Mount Lemmon Survey	·	2.3 km	MPC · JPL
874447	2020 UZ_{55}	—	August 26, 2019	Haleakala	Pan-STARRS 2	LIX	3.2 km	MPC · JPL
874448	2020 UW_{56}	—	August 22, 2014	Haleakala	Pan-STARRS 1	EOS	1.1 km	MPC · JPL
874449	2020 UY_{56}	—	May 16, 2018	Mount Lemmon	Mount Lemmon Survey	·	2.3 km	MPC · JPL
874450	2020 UE_{57}	—	October 23, 2020	Haleakala	Pan-STARRS 2	ELF	2.1 km	MPC · JPL
874451	2020 UF_{57}	—	October 13, 2020	Mount Lemmon	Mount Lemmon Survey	·	1.7 km	MPC · JPL
874452	2020 UV_{73}	—	October 9, 2015	Haleakala	Pan-STARRS 1	·	2.4 km	MPC · JPL
874453	2020 UV_{90}	—	November 18, 2014	Mount Lemmon	Mount Lemmon Survey	·	2.6 km	MPC · JPL
874454	2020 UG_{92}	—	August 28, 2014	Haleakala	Pan-STARRS 1	·	2.3 km	MPC · JPL
874455	2020 US_{92}	—	October 16, 2020	Mount Lemmon	Mount Lemmon Survey	·	1.6 km	MPC · JPL
874456	2020 VB_{8}	—	December 11, 2009	Mount Lemmon	Mount Lemmon Survey	·	1.7 km	MPC · JPL
874457	2020 VP_{8}	—	November 10, 2020	Mount Nanshan	X. Liao, X. Gao	·	1.0 km	MPC · JPL
874458	2020 VZ_{8}	—	June 3, 2019	Haleakala	Pan-STARRS 1	·	1.0 km	MPC · JPL
874459	2020 VA_{9}	—	November 13, 2020	Haleakala	Pan-STARRS 1	·	440 m	MPC · JPL
874460	2020 VE_{11}	—	November 11, 2020	Haleakala	Pan-STARRS 1	·	560 m	MPC · JPL
874461	2020 VJ_{11}	—	November 13, 2020	Haleakala	Pan-STARRS 1	·	1.2 km	MPC · JPL
874462	2020 VV_{11}	—	November 4, 2020	Mount Lemmon	Mount Lemmon Survey	H	440 m	MPC · JPL
874463	2020 VD_{12}	—	September 15, 2009	Kitt Peak	Spacewatch	EOS	1.3 km	MPC · JPL
874464	2020 VZ_{13}	—	September 12, 2015	Haleakala	Pan-STARRS 1	·	1.1 km	MPC · JPL
874465	2020 VN_{16}	—	October 13, 2014	Mount Lemmon	Mount Lemmon Survey	TIR	1.6 km	MPC · JPL
874466	2020 VJ_{17}	—	February 9, 2011	Kitt Peak	Spacewatch	·	1.7 km	MPC · JPL
874467	2020 VC_{18}	—	October 12, 2005	Kitt Peak	Spacewatch	·	790 m	MPC · JPL
874468	2020 VN_{20}	—	October 23, 2009	Mount Lemmon	Mount Lemmon Survey	·	2.0 km	MPC · JPL
874469	2020 VU_{20}	—	November 11, 2001	Sacramento Peak	SDSS	·	2.8 km	MPC · JPL
874470	2020 VZ_{25}	—	October 15, 2014	Nogales	M. Schwartz, P. R. Holvorcem	·	2.0 km	MPC · JPL
874471	2020 VT_{30}	—	September 19, 2014	Haleakala	Pan-STARRS 1	·	2.1 km	MPC · JPL
874472	2020 VU_{30}	—	October 3, 2013	Haleakala	Pan-STARRS 1	·	570 m	MPC · JPL
874473	2020 WL_{9}	—	December 4, 2007	Mount Lemmon	Mount Lemmon Survey	·	920 m	MPC · JPL
874474	2020 WD_{13}	—	January 7, 2017	Mount Lemmon	Mount Lemmon Survey	JUN	680 m	MPC · JPL
874475	2020 WE_{13}	—	May 20, 2015	Cerro Tololo	DECam	·	610 m	MPC · JPL
874476	2020 WS_{13}	—	November 21, 2015	Mount Lemmon	Mount Lemmon Survey	·	1.2 km	MPC · JPL
874477	2020 WV_{13}	—	November 16, 2020	Haleakala	Pan-STARRS 1	EOS	1.3 km	MPC · JPL
874478	2020 WV_{16}	—	December 1, 2016	Mount Lemmon	Mount Lemmon Survey	·	1.3 km	MPC · JPL
874479	2020 WV_{17}	—	November 16, 2020	Haleakala	Pan-STARRS 1	URS	2.4 km	MPC · JPL
874480	2020 WT_{18}	—	November 23, 2020	Mount Lemmon	Mount Lemmon Survey	·	2.6 km	MPC · JPL
874481	2020 WW_{18}	—	November 17, 2020	Haleakala	Pan-STARRS 1	·	1.9 km	MPC · JPL
874482	2020 WH_{35}	—	July 4, 2019	Haleakala	Pan-STARRS 1	·	1.8 km	MPC · JPL
874483	2020 XC_{8}	—	December 11, 2020	Haleakala	Pan-STARRS 2	H	390 m	MPC · JPL
874484	2020 XV_{8}	—	December 11, 2020	Haleakala	Pan-STARRS 2	H	340 m	MPC · JPL
874485	2020 XZ_{8}	—	December 14, 2020	Mount Lemmon	Mount Lemmon Survey	H	410 m	MPC · JPL
874486	2020 XA_{10}	—	October 12, 2015	Haleakala	Pan-STARRS 1	·	1.2 km	MPC · JPL
874487	2020 XS_{10}	—	December 9, 2020	Kitt Peak-Bok	Bok NEO Survey	T_{j} (2.95)	3.4 km	MPC · JPL
874488	2020 XR_{11}	—	December 14, 2020	Mount Lemmon	Mount Lemmon Survey	·	1.4 km	MPC · JPL
874489	2020 XJ_{12}	—	December 12, 2020	Haleakala	Pan-STARRS 1	H	370 m	MPC · JPL
874490	2020 XV_{14}	—	December 13, 2020	Kitt Peak-Bok	Bok NEO Survey	H	350 m	MPC · JPL
874491	2020 XZ_{14}	—	December 27, 2011	Kitt Peak	Spacewatch	·	1.1 km	MPC · JPL
874492	2020 XF_{15}	—	December 5, 2020	Mount Lemmon	Mount Lemmon Survey	·	940 m	MPC · JPL
874493	2020 XJ_{15}	—	December 12, 2020	Kitt Peak-Bok	Bok NEO Survey	AMO	190 m	MPC · JPL
874494	2020 XU_{15}	—	September 2, 2014	Haleakala	Pan-STARRS 1	H	380 m	MPC · JPL
874495	2020 XB_{16}	—	December 12, 2020	Haleakala	Pan-STARRS 1	·	1.6 km	MPC · JPL
874496	2020 XH_{18}	—	September 15, 2012	Mount Lemmon	Mount Lemmon Survey	·	650 m	MPC · JPL
874497	2020 XE_{20}	—	December 9, 2020	Kitt Peak-Bok	Bok NEO Survey	·	740 m	MPC · JPL
874498	2020 XT_{20}	—	December 9, 2020	Haleakala	Pan-STARRS 1	·	2.3 km	MPC · JPL
874499	2020 XT_{22}	—	December 14, 2020	Kitt Peak-Bok	Bok NEO Survey	H	310 m	MPC · JPL
874500	2020 XO_{23}	—	December 11, 2020	Haleakala	Pan-STARRS 1	H	300 m	MPC · JPL

== 874501–874600 ==
back to top

Designation			Discovery			Properties		Ref
Permanent	Provisional	Named after	Date	Site	Discoverer(s)	Category	Diam.	Ref
874501	2020 XF_{24}	—	December 14, 2020	Kitt Peak-Bok	Bok NEO Survey	·	1.5 km	MPC · JPL
874502	2020 YY_{1}	—	December 19, 2020	Mount Lemmon	Mount Lemmon Survey	H	420 m	MPC · JPL
874503	2020 YD_{7}	—	March 13, 2014	Mount Lemmon	Mount Lemmon Survey	PHO	540 m	MPC · JPL
874504	2020 YP_{10}	—	October 25, 2015	Haleakala	Pan-STARRS 1	·	1.3 km	MPC · JPL
874505	2020 YR_{11}	—	October 25, 2011	Haleakala	Pan-STARRS 1	·	960 m	MPC · JPL
874506	2020 YS_{12}	—	January 3, 2012	Mount Lemmon	Mount Lemmon Survey	·	1.2 km	MPC · JPL
874507	2020 YJ_{16}	—	November 11, 2004	Kitt Peak	Deep Ecliptic Survey	·	750 m	MPC · JPL
874508	2020 YL_{18}	—	December 21, 2020	Mount Lemmon	Mount Lemmon Survey	·	1.0 km	MPC · JPL
874509	2020 YO_{18}	—	March 16, 2016	Haleakala	Pan-STARRS 1	·	2.2 km	MPC · JPL
874510	2020 YW_{18}	—	February 26, 2014	Haleakala	Pan-STARRS 1	·	850 m	MPC · JPL
874511	2020 YO_{24}	—	December 23, 2020	Haleakala	Pan-STARRS 1	·	810 m	MPC · JPL
874512	2020 YN_{25}	—	December 23, 2020	Haleakala	Pan-STARRS 1	H	350 m	MPC · JPL
874513	2021 AA_{12}	—	January 4, 2021	Haleakala	Pan-STARRS 1	H	390 m	MPC · JPL
874514	2021 AE_{15}	—	January 11, 2021	Haleakala	Pan-STARRS 1	H	330 m	MPC · JPL
874515	2021 AV_{16}	—	January 5, 2017	Mount Lemmon	Mount Lemmon Survey	·	830 m	MPC · JPL
874516	2021 AG_{17}	—	December 31, 2013	Haleakala	Pan-STARRS 1	V	390 m	MPC · JPL
874517	2021 AT_{17}	—	March 14, 2011	Mount Lemmon	Mount Lemmon Survey	·	540 m	MPC · JPL
874518	2021 AO_{19}	—	December 2, 2016	Mount Lemmon	Mount Lemmon Survey	·	820 m	MPC · JPL
874519	2021 AQ_{21}	—	August 8, 2019	Haleakala	Pan-STARRS 1	·	820 m	MPC · JPL
874520	2021 AJ_{23}	—	June 17, 2018	Haleakala	Pan-STARRS 1	·	1.5 km	MPC · JPL
874521	2021 AS_{25}	—	January 10, 2021	Mount Lemmon	Mount Lemmon Survey	·	640 m	MPC · JPL
874522	2021 AR_{26}	—	January 12, 2021	Haleakala	Pan-STARRS 1	H	390 m	MPC · JPL
874523	2021 AV_{26}	—	March 13, 2012	Mount Lemmon	Mount Lemmon Survey	(13314)	1.5 km	MPC · JPL
874524	2021 AT_{29}	—	January 9, 2021	Mount Lemmon	Mount Lemmon Survey	·	660 m	MPC · JPL
874525	2021 BE_{5}	—	February 21, 2012	Kitt Peak	Spacewatch	·	1.5 km	MPC · JPL
874526	2021 BY_{6}	—	October 18, 2012	Haleakala	Pan-STARRS 1	CLA	1.1 km	MPC · JPL
874527	2021 BB_{14}	—	January 18, 2021	Mount Lemmon	Mount Lemmon Survey	·	2.1 km	MPC · JPL
874528	2021 BC_{14}	—	August 13, 2018	Haleakala	Pan-STARRS 1	·	2.1 km	MPC · JPL
874529	2021 BV_{14}	—	April 17, 2010	WISE	WISE	·	800 m	MPC · JPL
874530	2021 CD_{19}	—	March 28, 2017	Haleakala	Pan-STARRS 1	·	820 m	MPC · JPL
874531	2021 CA_{28}	—	October 9, 2012	Mount Lemmon	Mount Lemmon Survey	·	940 m	MPC · JPL
874532	2021 CL_{28}	—	April 3, 2016	Haleakala	Pan-STARRS 1	·	2.0 km	MPC · JPL
874533	2021 CB_{32}	—	February 7, 2021	Haleakala	Pan-STARRS 1	·	460 m	MPC · JPL
874534	2021 CL_{39}	—	April 19, 2018	Mount Lemmon	Mount Lemmon Survey	·	450 m	MPC · JPL
874535	2021 CL_{42}	—	February 5, 2021	Mount Lemmon	Mount Lemmon Survey	H	340 m	MPC · JPL
874536	2021 CM_{42}	—	September 4, 2013	Mauna Kea	M. Micheli	·	1.5 km	MPC · JPL
874537	2021 CF_{43}	—	February 7, 2021	Haleakala	Pan-STARRS 1	NYS	670 m	MPC · JPL
874538	2021 CX_{45}	—	September 14, 2007	Mount Lemmon	Mount Lemmon Survey	·	2.1 km	MPC · JPL
874539	2021 CG_{46}	—	January 15, 2015	Haleakala	Pan-STARRS 1	·	780 m	MPC · JPL
874540	2021 CY_{48}	—	February 10, 2021	Haleakala	Pan-STARRS 1	·	2.3 km	MPC · JPL
874541	2021 DE_{3}	—	August 7, 2008	Kitt Peak	Spacewatch	·	530 m	MPC · JPL
874542	2021 DH_{5}	—	February 16, 2021	Haleakala	Pan-STARRS 1	·	560 m	MPC · JPL
874543	2021 DD_{6}	—	July 24, 2015	Haleakala	Pan-STARRS 1	·	420 m	MPC · JPL
874544	2021 DN_{6}	—	May 5, 2010	Mount Lemmon	Mount Lemmon Survey	·	2.4 km	MPC · JPL
874545	2021 DR_{8}	—	April 27, 2017	Haleakala	Pan-STARRS 1	·	1.1 km	MPC · JPL
874546	2021 DE_{11}	—	July 8, 2018	Haleakala	Pan-STARRS 1	MAS	620 m	MPC · JPL
874547	2021 DQ_{11}	—	February 16, 2021	Haleakala	Pan-STARRS 1	·	530 m	MPC · JPL
874548	2021 DK_{16}	—	January 17, 2015	Haleakala	Pan-STARRS 1	·	1.7 km	MPC · JPL
874549	2021 DL_{17}	—	February 17, 2021	Haleakala	Pan-STARRS 1	·	860 m	MPC · JPL
874550	2021 DZ_{17}	—	September 4, 1999	Kitt Peak	Spacewatch	·	920 m	MPC · JPL
874551	2021 DC_{23}	—	February 17, 2021	Haleakala	Pan-STARRS 1	·	470 m	MPC · JPL
874552	2021 ED_{7}	—	September 4, 2008	Kitt Peak	Spacewatch	·	1.6 km	MPC · JPL
874553	2021 EU_{7}	—	May 23, 2014	Haleakala	Pan-STARRS 1	V	430 m	MPC · JPL
874554	2021 EZ_{7}	—	March 6, 2011	Mount Lemmon	Mount Lemmon Survey	·	440 m	MPC · JPL
874555	2021 EC_{8}	—	March 15, 2021	Haleakala	Pan-STARRS 1	·	730 m	MPC · JPL
874556	2021 ED_{8}	—	February 8, 2011	Mount Lemmon	Mount Lemmon Survey	·	440 m	MPC · JPL
874557	2021 EU_{8}	—	June 3, 2018	Haleakala	Pan-STARRS 1	·	450 m	MPC · JPL
874558	2021 EU_{11}	—	March 9, 2005	Mount Lemmon	Mount Lemmon Survey	3:2 · SHU	3.5 km	MPC · JPL
874559	2021 EF_{15}	—	April 28, 2012	Mount Lemmon	Mount Lemmon Survey	·	1.6 km	MPC · JPL
874560	2021 ES_{19}	—	August 5, 2018	Haleakala	Pan-STARRS 1	·	790 m	MPC · JPL
874561	2021 EL_{23}	—	February 8, 2002	Kitt Peak	Spacewatch	MAS	520 m	MPC · JPL
874562	2021 EE_{24}	—	February 28, 2014	Haleakala	Pan-STARRS 1	·	640 m	MPC · JPL
874563	2021 EL_{25}	—	January 16, 2009	Mount Lemmon	Mount Lemmon Survey	THM	1.9 km	MPC · JPL
874564	2021 EN_{26}	—	November 7, 2015	Mount Lemmon	Mount Lemmon Survey	·	520 m	MPC · JPL
874565	2021 EE_{27}	—	March 7, 2021	Mount Lemmon	Mount Lemmon Survey	·	570 m	MPC · JPL
874566	2021 EC_{31}	—	April 5, 2016	Haleakala	Pan-STARRS 1	·	1.9 km	MPC · JPL
874567	2021 EU_{37}	—	January 27, 2017	Haleakala	Pan-STARRS 1	·	650 m	MPC · JPL
874568	2021 EQ_{42}	—	January 20, 2015	Haleakala	Pan-STARRS 1	·	2.5 km	MPC · JPL
874569	2021 EA_{43}	—	March 15, 2021	Haleakala	Pan-STARRS 1	·	1.1 km	MPC · JPL
874570	2021 EO_{44}	—	March 15, 2021	Haleakala	Pan-STARRS 1	·	510 m	MPC · JPL
874571	2021 ET_{48}	—	March 15, 2021	Haleakala	Pan-STARRS 1	·	2.3 km	MPC · JPL
874572	2021 EE_{49}	—	January 20, 2015	Mount Lemmon	Mount Lemmon Survey	EOS	1.4 km	MPC · JPL
874573	2021 EG_{49}	—	March 15, 2021	Haleakala	Pan-STARRS 1	·	470 m	MPC · JPL
874574	2021 EW_{49}	—	March 15, 2021	Haleakala	Pan-STARRS 1	T_{j} (2.81)	2.4 km	MPC · JPL
874575	2021 FE_{5}	—	October 1, 2014	Haleakala	Pan-STARRS 1	·	850 m	MPC · JPL
874576	2021 FA_{7}	—	February 12, 2008	Kitt Peak	Spacewatch	·	530 m	MPC · JPL
874577	2021 FL_{7}	—	March 22, 2021	Mount Lemmon	Mount Lemmon Survey	·	2.1 km	MPC · JPL
874578	2021 FG_{10}	—	February 4, 2017	Haleakala	Pan-STARRS 1	·	620 m	MPC · JPL
874579	2021 FB_{11}	—	November 7, 2005	Mauna Kea	A. Boattini	NYS	890 m	MPC · JPL
874580	2021 FK_{11}	—	September 11, 2015	Haleakala	Pan-STARRS 1	·	540 m	MPC · JPL
874581	2021 FP_{15}	—	March 13, 2011	Kitt Peak	Spacewatch	·	470 m	MPC · JPL
874582	2021 FT_{16}	—	January 17, 2015	Haleakala	Pan-STARRS 1	·	2.3 km	MPC · JPL
874583	2021 FP_{18}	—	September 24, 2019	Haleakala	Pan-STARRS 1	·	530 m	MPC · JPL
874584	2021 FG_{19}	—	September 9, 2015	Haleakala	Pan-STARRS 1	·	510 m	MPC · JPL
874585	2021 FO_{19}	—	April 4, 2011	Kitt Peak	Spacewatch	·	520 m	MPC · JPL
874586	2021 FA_{22}	—	March 20, 2021	Haleakala	Pan-STARRS 1	MAR	630 m	MPC · JPL
874587	2021 FP_{22}	—	September 25, 2008	Kitt Peak	Spacewatch	·	580 m	MPC · JPL
874588	2021 FA_{28}	—	November 12, 2015	Mount Lemmon	Mount Lemmon Survey	·	680 m	MPC · JPL
874589	2021 FV_{30}	—	March 23, 2021	Kitt Peak-Bok	Bok NEO Survey	·	480 m	MPC · JPL
874590	2021 FB_{31}	—	April 10, 2010	Kitt Peak	Spacewatch	·	2.0 km	MPC · JPL
874591	2021 FH_{36}	—	March 19, 2021	Mount Lemmon	Mount Lemmon Survey	TIN	1.0 km	MPC · JPL
874592	2021 FL_{36}	—	April 5, 2014	Haleakala	Pan-STARRS 1	·	470 m	MPC · JPL
874593	2021 FW_{45}	—	March 28, 2016	Cerro Tololo	DECam	·	1.6 km	MPC · JPL
874594	2021 FA_{56}	—	March 18, 2021	Mount Lemmon	Mount Lemmon Survey	·	2.5 km	MPC · JPL
874595	2021 FO_{56}	—	March 20, 2021	Kitt Peak-Bok	Bok NEO Survey	L5	6.3 km	MPC · JPL
874596	2021 FV_{56}	—	October 11, 2012	Mount Lemmon	Mount Lemmon Survey	·	2.1 km	MPC · JPL
874597	2021 GF_{3}	—	August 8, 2018	Haleakala	Pan-STARRS 1	PHO	660 m	MPC · JPL
874598	2021 GB_{5}	—	August 29, 2006	Kitt Peak	Spacewatch	H	350 m	MPC · JPL
874599	2021 GK_{7}	—	October 11, 2012	Haleakala	Pan-STARRS 1	·	610 m	MPC · JPL
874600	2021 GL_{12}	—	February 16, 2015	Haleakala	Pan-STARRS 1	·	2.3 km	MPC · JPL

== 874601–874700 ==
back to top

Designation			Discovery			Properties		Ref
Permanent	Provisional	Named after	Date	Site	Discoverer(s)	Category	Diam.	Ref
874601	2021 GN_{12}	—	September 4, 2008	Kitt Peak	Spacewatch	·	520 m	MPC · JPL
874602	2021 GF_{14}	—	October 22, 2011	Mount Lemmon	Mount Lemmon Survey	NYS	790 m	MPC · JPL
874603	2021 GY_{14}	—	March 4, 2016	Haleakala	Pan-STARRS 1	·	1.3 km	MPC · JPL
874604	2021 GG_{23}	—	September 19, 2015	Haleakala	Pan-STARRS 1	·	600 m	MPC · JPL
874605	2021 GP_{25}	—	September 23, 2008	Mount Lemmon	Mount Lemmon Survey	·	500 m	MPC · JPL
874606	2021 GQ_{26}	—	February 24, 2015	Haleakala	Pan-STARRS 1	·	2.2 km	MPC · JPL
874607	2021 GQ_{28}	—	October 17, 2012	Haleakala	Pan-STARRS 1	·	2.2 km	MPC · JPL
874608	2021 GG_{31}	—	April 9, 2010	Kitt Peak	Spacewatch	·	840 m	MPC · JPL
874609	2021 GY_{38}	—	July 12, 2013	Haleakala	Pan-STARRS 1	·	940 m	MPC · JPL
874610	2021 GA_{42}	—	April 9, 2021	Mount Lemmon	Mount Lemmon Survey	·	780 m	MPC · JPL
874611	2021 GJ_{44}	—	March 26, 2007	Mount Lemmon	Mount Lemmon Survey	·	470 m	MPC · JPL
874612	2021 GW_{44}	—	March 13, 2010	Mount Lemmon	Mount Lemmon Survey	EMA	1.9 km	MPC · JPL
874613	2021 GD_{45}	—	September 11, 2018	Mount Lemmon	Mount Lemmon Survey	NYS	740 m	MPC · JPL
874614	2021 GV_{45}	—	February 28, 2009	Kitt Peak	Spacewatch	·	2.0 km	MPC · JPL
874615	2021 GL_{46}	—	November 9, 2018	Haleakala	Pan-STARRS 2	·	2.1 km	MPC · JPL
874616	2021 GZ_{46}	—	September 23, 2008	Mount Lemmon	Mount Lemmon Survey	·	560 m	MPC · JPL
874617	2021 GZ_{48}	—	May 7, 2008	Mount Lemmon	Mount Lemmon Survey	·	1.2 km	MPC · JPL
874618	2021 GP_{50}	—	August 2, 2011	Haleakala	Pan-STARRS 1	·	1.6 km	MPC · JPL
874619	2021 GB_{51}	—	March 26, 2008	Mount Lemmon	Mount Lemmon Survey	·	410 m	MPC · JPL
874620	2021 GT_{52}	—	May 28, 2011	Mount Lemmon	Mount Lemmon Survey	·	470 m	MPC · JPL
874621	2021 GC_{56}	—	August 11, 2018	Haleakala	Pan-STARRS 1	·	720 m	MPC · JPL
874622	2021 GM_{56}	—	April 20, 2007	Kitt Peak	Spacewatch	·	1.5 km	MPC · JPL
874623	2021 GP_{56}	—	July 9, 2018	Haleakala	Pan-STARRS 1	·	540 m	MPC · JPL
874624	2021 GY_{56}	—	January 14, 2016	Haleakala	Pan-STARRS 1	·	1.2 km	MPC · JPL
874625	2021 GD_{57}	—	January 20, 2015	Haleakala	Pan-STARRS 1	·	1.8 km	MPC · JPL
874626	2021 GQ_{59}	—	September 30, 2006	Mount Lemmon	Mount Lemmon Survey	·	460 m	MPC · JPL
874627	2021 GH_{68}	—	April 7, 2021	Haleakala	Pan-STARRS 1	THM	1.8 km	MPC · JPL
874628	2021 GM_{68}	—	April 15, 2021	Haleakala	Pan-STARRS 1	L5	7.1 km	MPC · JPL
874629	2021 GN_{70}	—	January 27, 2017	Haleakala	Pan-STARRS 1	·	790 m	MPC · JPL
874630	2021 GL_{77}	—	March 25, 2011	Kitt Peak	Spacewatch	·	480 m	MPC · JPL
874631	2021 GD_{78}	—	January 20, 2015	Haleakala	Pan-STARRS 1	·	1.4 km	MPC · JPL
874632	2021 GU_{78}	—	February 7, 2008	Mount Lemmon	Mount Lemmon Survey	·	490 m	MPC · JPL
874633	2021 GU_{86}	—	June 20, 2017	Haleakala	Pan-STARRS 1	·	920 m	MPC · JPL
874634	2021 GN_{88}	—	September 19, 2009	Kitt Peak	Spacewatch	·	390 m	MPC · JPL
874635	2021 GZ_{89}	—	April 7, 2021	Haleakala	Pan-STARRS 1	L5	5.8 km	MPC · JPL
874636	2021 GF_{94}	—	September 23, 2008	Kitt Peak	Spacewatch	·	1.8 km	MPC · JPL
874637	2021 GY_{95}	—	April 10, 2021	Haleakala	Pan-STARRS 1	HOF	1.7 km	MPC · JPL
874638	2021 GJ_{100}	—	October 13, 2007	Mount Lemmon	Mount Lemmon Survey	MAS	490 m	MPC · JPL
874639	2021 GV_{103}	—	April 9, 2021	Haleakala	Pan-STARRS 1	·	660 m	MPC · JPL
874640	2021 GY_{104}	—	April 10, 2021	Haleakala	Pan-STARRS 1	·	2.4 km	MPC · JPL
874641	2021 GZ_{105}	—	September 26, 2011	Haleakala	Pan-STARRS 1	·	440 m	MPC · JPL
874642	2021 GH_{106}	—	April 10, 2021	Haleakala	Pan-STARRS 1	·	2.0 km	MPC · JPL
874643	2021 GA_{109}	—	April 7, 2021	Haleakala	Pan-STARRS 1	·	1.5 km	MPC · JPL
874644	2021 GL_{111}	—	April 7, 2021	Haleakala	Pan-STARRS 1	·	450 m	MPC · JPL
874645	2021 GW_{113}	—	April 6, 2021	Haleakala	Pan-STARRS 1	·	430 m	MPC · JPL
874646	2021 GL_{123}	—	April 10, 2021	Haleakala	Pan-STARRS 1	L5	7.0 km	MPC · JPL
874647	2021 GW_{130}	—	April 15, 2021	Haleakala	Pan-STARRS 1	·	470 m	MPC · JPL
874648	2021 GD_{139}	—	April 6, 2021	Mount Lemmon	Mount Lemmon Survey	·	2.7 km	MPC · JPL
874649	2021 GM_{142}	—	April 12, 2016	Haleakala	Pan-STARRS 1	·	1.9 km	MPC · JPL
874650	2021 GV_{149}	—	March 19, 2010	Mount Lemmon	Mount Lemmon Survey	·	670 m	MPC · JPL
874651	2021 GM_{151}	—	August 26, 2012	Haleakala	Pan-STARRS 1	·	2.2 km	MPC · JPL
874652	2021 GB_{153}	—	February 26, 2014	Haleakala	Pan-STARRS 1	·	480 m	MPC · JPL
874653	2021 GN_{156}	—	September 19, 2017	Haleakala	Pan-STARRS 1	·	1.6 km	MPC · JPL
874654	2021 GA_{158}	—	December 3, 2019	Haleakala	Pan-STARRS 1	·	790 m	MPC · JPL
874655	2021 GN_{166}	—	April 18, 2015	Cerro Tololo	DECam	·	2.2 km	MPC · JPL
874656	2021 GR_{166}	—	April 15, 2021	Haleakala	Pan-STARRS 1	·	390 m	MPC · JPL
874657	2021 GS_{166}	—	April 15, 2021	Haleakala	Pan-STARRS 1	EOS	1.3 km	MPC · JPL
874658	2021 GJ_{167}	—	August 28, 2017	Mount Lemmon	Mount Lemmon Survey	EOS	1.3 km	MPC · JPL
874659	2021 GU_{170}	—	March 23, 2021	Mount Lemmon	Mount Lemmon Survey	·	2.0 km	MPC · JPL
874660	2021 GO_{171}	—	April 13, 2021	Haleakala	Pan-STARRS 1	·	480 m	MPC · JPL
874661	2021 GE_{181}	—	April 15, 2021	Haleakala	Pan-STARRS 1	·	1.8 km	MPC · JPL
874662	2021 GS_{192}	—	April 10, 2021	Haleakala	Pan-STARRS 1	·	470 m	MPC · JPL
874663	2021 GK_{193}	—	November 17, 2009	Mount Lemmon	Mount Lemmon Survey	·	440 m	MPC · JPL
874664	2021 GV_{195}	—	April 3, 2021	Mount Lemmon	Mount Lemmon Survey	·	500 m	MPC · JPL
874665	2021 GX_{196}	—	August 11, 2018	Haleakala	Pan-STARRS 1	·	770 m	MPC · JPL
874666	2021 HX_{5}	—	April 10, 2010	Mount Lemmon	Mount Lemmon Survey	ERI	900 m	MPC · JPL
874667	2021 HY_{5}	—	May 18, 2015	Haleakala	Pan-STARRS 1	·	2.5 km	MPC · JPL
874668	2021 HW_{7}	—	June 16, 2012	Haleakala	Pan-STARRS 1	·	930 m	MPC · JPL
874669	2021 HC_{10}	—	January 28, 2015	Haleakala	Pan-STARRS 1	·	1.9 km	MPC · JPL
874670	2021 HR_{11}	—	October 15, 2015	Haleakala	Pan-STARRS 1	·	730 m	MPC · JPL
874671	2021 HY_{13}	—	September 25, 2011	Haleakala	Pan-STARRS 1	V	380 m	MPC · JPL
874672	2021 HW_{14}	—	April 22, 2021	Haleakala	Pan-STARRS 1	L5	6.4 km	MPC · JPL
874673	2021 HA_{16}	—	April 16, 2021	Haleakala	Pan-STARRS 1	·	560 m	MPC · JPL
874674	2021 HK_{17}	—	April 18, 2015	Cerro Tololo	DECam	THM	1.7 km	MPC · JPL
874675	2021 HP_{17}	—	June 24, 2014	Haleakala	Pan-STARRS 1	·	770 m	MPC · JPL
874676	2021 HU_{18}	—	April 17, 2021	Haleakala	Pan-STARRS 1	L5	6.5 km	MPC · JPL
874677	2021 HJ_{19}	—	May 6, 2014	Haleakala	Pan-STARRS 1	V	360 m	MPC · JPL
874678	2021 HD_{21}	—	October 9, 2012	Mount Lemmon	Mount Lemmon Survey	·	1.2 km	MPC · JPL
874679	2021 HD_{34}	—	April 16, 2021	Haleakala	Pan-STARRS 1	·	550 m	MPC · JPL
874680	2021 HR_{34}	—	April 17, 2021	Haleakala	Pan-STARRS 1	·	650 m	MPC · JPL
874681	2021 JH_{10}	—	January 20, 2017	Haleakala	Pan-STARRS 1	·	440 m	MPC · JPL
874682	2021 JH_{12}	—	April 23, 2014	Cerro Tololo	DECam	·	380 m	MPC · JPL
874683	2021 JL_{12}	—	January 14, 2008	Kitt Peak	Spacewatch	(1118)	2.3 km	MPC · JPL
874684	2021 JU_{13}	—	November 1, 2013	Mount Lemmon	Mount Lemmon Survey	·	1.4 km	MPC · JPL
874685	2021 JZ_{13}	—	May 26, 2014	Haleakala	Pan-STARRS 1	V	390 m	MPC · JPL
874686	2021 JH_{16}	—	February 22, 2017	Mount Lemmon	Mount Lemmon Survey	·	640 m	MPC · JPL
874687	2021 JP_{17}	—	June 25, 2018	Haleakala	Pan-STARRS 1	PHO	670 m	MPC · JPL
874688	2021 JF_{18}	—	May 10, 2021	Haleakala	Pan-STARRS 1	L5	6.1 km	MPC · JPL
874689	2021 JW_{18}	—	August 14, 2015	Haleakala	Pan-STARRS 1	·	520 m	MPC · JPL
874690	2021 JM_{20}	—	April 18, 2020	Haleakala	Pan-STARRS 1	L5	6.4 km	MPC · JPL
874691	2021 JC_{22}	—	August 22, 2018	Haleakala	Pan-STARRS 1	·	650 m	MPC · JPL
874692	2021 JK_{24}	—	May 11, 2021	Haleakala	Pan-STARRS 1	L5	6.2 km	MPC · JPL
874693	2021 JQ_{26}	—	May 8, 2021	Haleakala	Pan-STARRS 1	L5	6.3 km	MPC · JPL
874694	2021 JC_{27}	—	August 6, 2018	Haleakala	Pan-STARRS 1	·	640 m	MPC · JPL
874695	2021 JK_{27}	—	March 18, 2017	Haleakala	Pan-STARRS 1	·	730 m	MPC · JPL
874696	2021 JS_{35}	—	May 13, 2021	Haleakala	Pan-STARRS 1	·	2.4 km	MPC · JPL
874697	2021 JZ_{36}	—	April 17, 2015	Cerro Tololo	DECam	·	1.9 km	MPC · JPL
874698	2021 JK_{40}	—	December 20, 2014	Haleakala	Pan-STARRS 1	·	2.6 km	MPC · JPL
874699	2021 JL_{48}	—	August 13, 2015	Haleakala	Pan-STARRS 1	·	420 m	MPC · JPL
874700	2021 JF_{50}	—	July 19, 2015	Haleakala	Pan-STARRS 1	·	910 m	MPC · JPL

== 874701–874800 ==
back to top

Designation			Discovery			Properties		Ref
Permanent	Provisional	Named after	Date	Site	Discoverer(s)	Category	Diam.	Ref
874701	2021 JC_{58}	—	May 12, 2021	Haleakala	Pan-STARRS 1	L5	7.5 km	MPC · JPL
874702	2021 JJ_{66}	—	September 6, 2008	Mount Lemmon	Mount Lemmon Survey	·	540 m	MPC · JPL
874703	2021 JK_{69}	—	May 12, 2021	Haleakala	Pan-STARRS 1	·	470 m	MPC · JPL
874704	2021 JZ_{76}	—	November 21, 2014	Haleakala	Pan-STARRS 1	L5	6.4 km	MPC · JPL
874705	2021 JG_{78}	—	May 10, 2021	Haleakala	Pan-STARRS 1	L5	6.7 km	MPC · JPL
874706	2021 KT_{4}	—	May 21, 2021	Haleakala	Pan-STARRS 1	H	390 m	MPC · JPL
874707	2021 KR_{5}	—	May 22, 2021	Mount Lemmon	Mount Lemmon Survey	·	730 m	MPC · JPL
874708	2021 KP_{9}	—	November 2, 2018	Mount Lemmon	Mount Lemmon Survey	·	610 m	MPC · JPL
874709	2021 KJ_{11}	—	July 1, 2014	Haleakala	Pan-STARRS 1	·	650 m	MPC · JPL
874710	2021 KP_{13}	—	January 23, 2014	Mount Lemmon	Mount Lemmon Survey	·	2.1 km	MPC · JPL
874711	2021 KN_{16}	—	August 10, 2010	Kitt Peak	Spacewatch	MAS	480 m	MPC · JPL
874712	2021 LG_{14}	—	February 16, 2015	Haleakala	Pan-STARRS 1	·	1.4 km	MPC · JPL
874713	2021 LK_{16}	—	April 20, 2017	Haleakala	Pan-STARRS 1	V	420 m	MPC · JPL
874714	2021 LZ_{19}	—	June 7, 2021	Haleakala	Pan-STARRS 1	·	790 m	MPC · JPL
874715	2021 LB_{21}	—	October 29, 2014	Haleakala	Pan-STARRS 1	·	1.0 km	MPC · JPL
874716	2021 LU_{26}	—	October 25, 2014	Mount Lemmon	Mount Lemmon Survey	·	870 m	MPC · JPL
874717	2021 LQ_{27}	—	February 26, 2009	Mauna Kea	P. A. Wiegert	PHO	550 m	MPC · JPL
874718	2021 LO_{35}	—	September 2, 2014	Haleakala	Pan-STARRS 1	V	450 m	MPC · JPL
874719	2021 LN_{38}	—	June 9, 2021	Haleakala	Pan-STARRS 1	·	2.2 km	MPC · JPL
874720	2021 LZ_{39}	—	June 8, 2021	Haleakala	Pan-STARRS 1	·	560 m	MPC · JPL
874721	2021 LR_{46}	—	April 26, 2017	Haleakala	Pan-STARRS 1	MAS	560 m	MPC · JPL
874722	2021 LP_{51}	—	June 8, 2021	Haleakala	Pan-STARRS 1	L5	6.4 km	MPC · JPL
874723	2021 MN	—	June 16, 2021	Haleakala	Pan-STARRS 1	·	310 m	MPC · JPL
874724	2021 MM_{4}	—	August 29, 2016	Mount Lemmon	Mount Lemmon Survey	·	1.8 km	MPC · JPL
874725	2021 MT_{8}	—	June 20, 2021	Haleakala	Pan-STARRS 1	·	910 m	MPC · JPL
874726	2021 MA_{17}	—	October 15, 2017	Mount Lemmon	Mount Lemmon Survey	·	590 m	MPC · JPL
874727	2021 MR_{18}	—	June 18, 2021	Haleakala	Pan-STARRS 1	V	400 m	MPC · JPL
874728	2021 NZ_{1}	—	July 6, 2021	Haleakala	Pan-STARRS 1	AMO	480 m	MPC · JPL
874729	2021 NV_{2}	—	June 27, 2014	Haleakala	Pan-STARRS 1	·	580 m	MPC · JPL
874730	2021 NH_{5}	—	October 9, 2016	Haleakala	Pan-STARRS 1	H	490 m	MPC · JPL
874731	2021 NM_{6}	—	July 9, 2021	Haleakala	Pan-STARRS 1	·	1.1 km	MPC · JPL
874732	2021 NO_{7}	—	June 24, 2017	Haleakala	Pan-STARRS 1	MAS	530 m	MPC · JPL
874733	2021 NR_{17}	—	April 24, 2020	Mount Lemmon	Mount Lemmon Survey	·	1.4 km	MPC · JPL
874734	2021 NL_{20}	—	December 26, 2014	Haleakala	Pan-STARRS 1	·	890 m	MPC · JPL
874735	2021 NR_{20}	—	May 21, 2015	Haleakala	Pan-STARRS 1	·	1.2 km	MPC · JPL
874736	2021 NA_{40}	—	July 7, 2021	Haleakala	Pan-STARRS 1	·	1.3 km	MPC · JPL
874737	2021 NV_{47}	—	July 4, 2021	Haleakala	Pan-STARRS 1	·	980 m	MPC · JPL
874738	2021 NF_{57}	—	April 23, 2014	Cerro Tololo	DECam	·	2.1 km	MPC · JPL
874739	2021 NW_{63}	—	July 4, 2021	Haleakala	Pan-STARRS 1	NYS	810 m	MPC · JPL
874740	2021 NC_{65}	—	July 5, 2021	Haleakala	Pan-STARRS 1	URS	2.1 km	MPC · JPL
874741	2021 NY_{70}	—	October 29, 2011	Kitt Peak	Spacewatch	V	400 m	MPC · JPL
874742	2021 NX_{85}	—	July 9, 2021	Mount Lemmon	Mount Lemmon Survey	·	1.0 km	MPC · JPL
874743	2021 NO_{87}	—	March 3, 2016	Mount Lemmon	Mount Lemmon Survey	·	1.1 km	MPC · JPL
874744	2021 NT_{87}	—	July 13, 2021	Haleakala	Pan-STARRS 1	·	810 m	MPC · JPL
874745	2021 OL_{1}	—	October 1, 2008	Mount Lemmon	Mount Lemmon Survey	·	410 m	MPC · JPL
874746	2021 OV_{1}	—	November 27, 2014	Haleakala	Pan-STARRS 1	V	460 m	MPC · JPL
874747	2021 OS_{2}	—	July 16, 2021	Haleakala	Pan-STARRS 1	·	890 m	MPC · JPL
874748	2021 OO_{3}	—	September 3, 2010	Mount Lemmon	Mount Lemmon Survey	·	1.9 km	MPC · JPL
874749	2021 OL_{11}	—	October 16, 2006	Catalina	CSS	·	860 m	MPC · JPL
874750	2021 OO_{13}	—	September 23, 2014	Mount Lemmon	Mount Lemmon Survey	·	710 m	MPC · JPL
874751	2021 OM_{14}	—	October 3, 2006	Mount Lemmon	Mount Lemmon Survey	·	860 m	MPC · JPL
874752	2021 OA_{16}	—	July 16, 2021	Haleakala	Pan-STARRS 1	·	1.9 km	MPC · JPL
874753	2021 OZ_{20}	—	July 17, 2021	Haleakala	Pan-STARRS 1	·	2.2 km	MPC · JPL
874754	2021 OU_{22}	—	July 30, 2021	Haleakala	Pan-STARRS 1	·	840 m	MPC · JPL
874755	2021 OZ_{23}	—	December 9, 2018	Mount Lemmon	Mount Lemmon Survey	PHO	710 m	MPC · JPL
874756	2021 OP_{31}	—	September 29, 2014	Haleakala	Pan-STARRS 1	·	900 m	MPC · JPL
874757	2021 PM_{11}	—	November 21, 2017	Mount Lemmon	Mount Lemmon Survey	(5)	730 m	MPC · JPL
874758	2021 PO_{13}	—	August 8, 2016	Haleakala	Pan-STARRS 1	EOS	1.4 km	MPC · JPL
874759	2021 PF_{14}	—	October 18, 2017	Mount Lemmon	Mount Lemmon Survey	·	1.0 km	MPC · JPL
874760	2021 PR_{20}	—	April 8, 2013	Mount Lemmon	Mount Lemmon Survey	·	860 m	MPC · JPL
874761	2021 PO_{23}	—	January 9, 2019	Haleakala	Pan-STARRS 1	MAR	720 m	MPC · JPL
874762	2021 PN_{30}	—	October 19, 2006	Mount Lemmon	Mount Lemmon Survey	·	800 m	MPC · JPL
874763	2021 PU_{30}	—	October 29, 2014	Haleakala	Pan-STARRS 1	·	890 m	MPC · JPL
874764	2021 PY_{30}	—	February 14, 2013	Haleakala	Pan-STARRS 1	·	1.9 km	MPC · JPL
874765	2021 PT_{40}	—	August 8, 2021	Haleakala	Pan-STARRS 1	·	1.5 km	MPC · JPL
874766	2021 PZ_{43}	—	October 21, 2006	Kitt Peak	Spacewatch	NYS	760 m	MPC · JPL
874767	2021 PN_{49}	—	August 11, 2021	Haleakala	Pan-STARRS 1	·	850 m	MPC · JPL
874768	2021 PE_{58}	—	August 5, 2021	Haleakala	Pan-STARRS 1	H	340 m	MPC · JPL
874769	2021 PZ_{73}	—	November 7, 2008	Mount Lemmon	Mount Lemmon Survey	·	380 m	MPC · JPL
874770	2021 PX_{93}	—	August 10, 2021	Haleakala	Pan-STARRS 1	H	370 m	MPC · JPL
874771	2021 PQ_{94}	—	March 25, 2017	Haleakala	Pan-STARRS 1	·	410 m	MPC · JPL
874772	2021 PQ_{108}	—	September 11, 2010	Mount Lemmon	Mount Lemmon Survey	·	900 m	MPC · JPL
874773	2021 PW_{119}	—	April 15, 2012	Haleakala	Pan-STARRS 1	·	710 m	MPC · JPL
874774	2021 PD_{120}	—	August 14, 2021	Haleakala	Pan-STARRS 1	·	1.1 km	MPC · JPL
874775	2021 PZ_{126}	—	August 7, 1999	Kitt Peak	Spacewatch	·	1.2 km	MPC · JPL
874776	2021 PA_{128}	—	June 11, 2015	Haleakala	Pan-STARRS 1	KOR	930 m	MPC · JPL
874777	2021 PQ_{136}	—	August 4, 2021	Haleakala	Pan-STARRS 1	·	610 m	MPC · JPL
874778	2021 PB_{150}	—	August 9, 2021	Haleakala	Pan-STARRS 1	·	820 m	MPC · JPL
874779	2021 PH_{150}	—	August 5, 2021	Haleakala	Pan-STARRS 1	·	680 m	MPC · JPL
874780	2021 PV_{150}	—	November 30, 2005	Mount Lemmon	Mount Lemmon Survey	EOS	1.4 km	MPC · JPL
874781	2021 PP_{153}	—	January 1, 2008	Kitt Peak	Spacewatch	EOS	1.4 km	MPC · JPL
874782	2021 PK_{154}	—	August 8, 2021	Haleakala	Pan-STARRS 1	·	1.1 km	MPC · JPL
874783	2021 PO_{179}	—	August 10, 2021	Haleakala	Pan-STARRS 1	·	2.0 km	MPC · JPL
874784	2021 PD_{227}	—	August 3, 2021	Haleakala	Pan-STARRS 1	·	1.0 km	MPC · JPL
874785	2021 QO	—	June 4, 2013	Mount Lemmon	Mount Lemmon Survey	T_{j} (2.96)	3.1 km	MPC · JPL
874786	2021 QT	—	August 21, 2021	Haleakala	Pan-STARRS 1	BAR	790 m	MPC · JPL
874787	2021 QC_{12}	—	August 14, 2013	Haleakala	Pan-STARRS 1	·	720 m	MPC · JPL
874788	2021 QG_{18}	—	September 29, 2010	Mount Lemmon	Mount Lemmon Survey	V	410 m	MPC · JPL
874789	2021 QL_{19}	—	August 30, 2021	Haleakala	Pan-STARRS 2	JUN	780 m	MPC · JPL
874790	2021 QQ_{24}	—	October 17, 2010	Mount Lemmon	Mount Lemmon Survey	URS	2.2 km	MPC · JPL
874791	2021 QC_{30}	—	December 14, 2010	Mount Lemmon	Mount Lemmon Survey	·	850 m	MPC · JPL
874792	2021 QS_{35}	—	July 24, 2017	Haleakala	Pan-STARRS 1	·	690 m	MPC · JPL
874793	2021 QT_{47}	—	November 11, 2006	Kitt Peak	Spacewatch	NYS	860 m	MPC · JPL
874794	2021 QG_{48}	—	August 31, 2021	Haleakala	Pan-STARRS 1	·	2.2 km	MPC · JPL
874795	2021 QQ_{53}	—	January 23, 2018	Mount Lemmon	Mount Lemmon Survey	·	1.6 km	MPC · JPL
874796	2021 QM_{54}	—	November 28, 2010	Mount Lemmon	Mount Lemmon Survey	·	2.2 km	MPC · JPL
874797	2021 QQ_{55}	—	April 19, 2015	Cerro Tololo	DECam	·	1.0 km	MPC · JPL
874798	2021 QO_{56}	—	August 20, 2021	Haleakala	Pan-STARRS 1	·	1.3 km	MPC · JPL
874799	2021 QA_{60}	—	August 17, 2009	Kitt Peak	Spacewatch	L4	6.1 km	MPC · JPL
874800	2021 QE_{67}	—	March 13, 2012	Mount Lemmon	Mount Lemmon Survey	·	2.0 km	MPC · JPL

== 874801–874900 ==
back to top

Designation			Discovery			Properties		Ref
Permanent	Provisional	Named after	Date	Site	Discoverer(s)	Category	Diam.	Ref
874801	2021 QW_{81}	—	August 16, 2021	Haleakala	Pan-STARRS 1	·	1.1 km	MPC · JPL
874802	2021 QH_{96}	—	September 25, 2016	Haleakala	Pan-STARRS 1	·	2.1 km	MPC · JPL
874803	2021 QA_{101}	—	August 30, 2021	Haleakala	Pan-STARRS 1	·	1.1 km	MPC · JPL
874804	2021 RA_{3}	—	October 29, 2017	Haleakala	Pan-STARRS 1	·	710 m	MPC · JPL
874805	2021 RN_{4}	—	September 4, 2008	Kitt Peak	Spacewatch	·	1.2 km	MPC · JPL
874806	2021 RN_{8}	—	September 1, 2017	Haleakala	Pan-STARRS 1	·	1.0 km	MPC · JPL
874807	2021 RY_{8}	—	May 21, 2017	Haleakala	Pan-STARRS 1	MAS	490 m	MPC · JPL
874808	2021 RM_{9}	—	September 3, 2021	Haleakala	Pan-STARRS 1	EUN	910 m	MPC · JPL
874809	2021 RU_{13}	—	November 21, 2017	Mount Lemmon	Mount Lemmon Survey	MAR	750 m	MPC · JPL
874810	2021 RX_{19}	—	December 16, 2017	Mount Lemmon	Mount Lemmon Survey	·	1.2 km	MPC · JPL
874811	2021 RP_{26}	—	September 26, 2000	Kitt Peak	Spacewatch	·	830 m	MPC · JPL
874812	2021 RF_{27}	—	September 7, 2021	Mount Lemmon	Mount Lemmon Survey	EUN	870 m	MPC · JPL
874813	2021 RX_{29}	—	October 11, 2017	Haleakala	Pan-STARRS 1	·	1.1 km	MPC · JPL
874814	2021 RF_{31}	—	September 19, 2017	Haleakala	Pan-STARRS 1	·	650 m	MPC · JPL
874815	2021 RH_{37}	—	September 5, 2021	Haleakala	Pan-STARRS 2	HNS	790 m	MPC · JPL
874816	2021 RA_{47}	—	April 23, 2015	Haleakala	Pan-STARRS 1	HNS	780 m	MPC · JPL
874817	2021 RY_{50}	—	November 18, 2017	Haleakala	Pan-STARRS 1	·	1.2 km	MPC · JPL
874818	2021 RO_{52}	—	September 13, 2017	Haleakala	Pan-STARRS 1	PHO	740 m	MPC · JPL
874819	2021 RN_{56}	—	October 27, 2017	Mount Lemmon	Mount Lemmon Survey	(5)	600 m	MPC · JPL
874820	2021 RV_{66}	—	September 9, 2021	Haleakala	Pan-STARRS 2	·	1.2 km	MPC · JPL
874821	2021 RK_{72}	—	October 22, 2017	Mount Lemmon	Mount Lemmon Survey	·	710 m	MPC · JPL
874822	2021 RZ_{77}	—	September 9, 2021	Haleakala	Pan-STARRS 2	BRG	1.2 km	MPC · JPL
874823	2021 RJ_{78}	—	September 10, 2021	Haleakala	Pan-STARRS 1	·	300 m	MPC · JPL
874824	2021 RE_{94}	—	September 9, 2021	Mount Lemmon	Mount Lemmon Survey	·	700 m	MPC · JPL
874825	2021 RG_{98}	—	November 2, 2010	Mount Lemmon	Mount Lemmon Survey	·	2.1 km	MPC · JPL
874826	2021 RS_{99}	—	September 23, 2008	Kitt Peak	Spacewatch	·	1.0 km	MPC · JPL
874827	2021 RD_{100}	—	September 13, 2021	Mount Lemmon	Mount Lemmon Survey	H	450 m	MPC · JPL
874828	2021 RQ_{101}	—	September 11, 2021	Haleakala	Pan-STARRS 1	(5)	1.0 km	MPC · JPL
874829	2021 RF_{109}	—	September 21, 2012	Mount Lemmon	Mount Lemmon Survey	EUN	870 m	MPC · JPL
874830	2021 RW_{112}	—	September 4, 2021	Haleakala	Pan-STARRS 2	·	1.1 km	MPC · JPL
874831	2021 RN_{116}	—	September 7, 2021	Haleakala	Pan-STARRS 2	·	1.3 km	MPC · JPL
874832	2021 RC_{118}	—	September 27, 2000	Kitt Peak	Spacewatch	BRG	820 m	MPC · JPL
874833	2021 RD_{121}	—	May 24, 2014	Haleakala	Pan-STARRS 1	·	550 m	MPC · JPL
874834	2021 RN_{124}	—	October 25, 2013	Kitt Peak	Spacewatch	KON	1.4 km	MPC · JPL
874835	2021 RB_{129}	—	September 11, 2021	Haleakala	Pan-STARRS 1	·	1.2 km	MPC · JPL
874836	2021 RD_{131}	—	September 4, 2021	Haleakala	Pan-STARRS 2	EUN	940 m	MPC · JPL
874837	2021 RJ_{134}	—	March 23, 2015	Kitt Peak	L. H. Wasserman, M. W. Buie	·	1.1 km	MPC · JPL
874838	2021 RJ_{139}	—	December 1, 2000	Kitt Peak	Spacewatch	EUN	840 m	MPC · JPL
874839	2021 RM_{139}	—	September 9, 2021	Mount Lemmon	Mount Lemmon Survey	·	1.1 km	MPC · JPL
874840	2021 RP_{141}	—	August 24, 2005	Palomar	NEAT	·	470 m	MPC · JPL
874841	2021 RD_{142}	—	October 8, 2008	Mount Lemmon	Mount Lemmon Survey	·	820 m	MPC · JPL
874842	2021 RO_{142}	—	July 5, 2016	Haleakala	Pan-STARRS 1	EUN	930 m	MPC · JPL
874843	2021 RQ_{142}	—	August 1, 2016	Haleakala	Pan-STARRS 1	·	1.2 km	MPC · JPL
874844	2021 RJ_{145}	—	May 15, 2020	Haleakala	Pan-STARRS 1	·	920 m	MPC · JPL
874845	2021 RO_{151}	—	September 8, 2021	Haleakala	Pan-STARRS 2	·	1.1 km	MPC · JPL
874846	2021 RR_{163}	—	May 20, 2015	Cerro Tololo	DECam	HOF	1.6 km	MPC · JPL
874847	2021 RK_{176}	—	April 19, 2015	Cerro Tololo	DECam	·	1.3 km	MPC · JPL
874848	2021 RT_{181}	—	July 14, 2020	Pleasant Groves	Holbrook, M.	·	1.4 km	MPC · JPL
874849	2021 RT_{206}	—	November 5, 2016	Haleakala	Pan-STARRS 1	·	2.3 km	MPC · JPL
874850	2021 RE_{246}	—	December 20, 2014	Haleakala	Pan-STARRS 1	·	1.4 km	MPC · JPL
874851	2021 RJ_{254}	—	January 22, 2015	Haleakala	Pan-STARRS 1	·	840 m	MPC · JPL
874852	2021 SB_{7}	—	October 28, 2017	Haleakala	Pan-STARRS 1	·	1.1 km	MPC · JPL
874853	2021 SU_{7}	—	September 5, 2010	Mount Lemmon	Mount Lemmon Survey	·	1.7 km	MPC · JPL
874854	2021 SN_{15}	—	April 14, 2018	Mount Lemmon	Mount Lemmon Survey	TIR	2.3 km	MPC · JPL
874855	2021 SF_{18}	—	October 3, 2008	Mount Lemmon	Mount Lemmon Survey	·	1.1 km	MPC · JPL
874856	2021 SZ_{21}	—	June 14, 2020	Haleakala	Pan-STARRS 1	·	790 m	MPC · JPL
874857	2021 SL_{24}	—	August 17, 2012	Haleakala	Pan-STARRS 1	·	1.2 km	MPC · JPL
874858	2021 SX_{26}	—	September 19, 1998	Sacramento Peak	SDSS	·	820 m	MPC · JPL
874859	2021 SJ_{33}	—	October 26, 2008	Kitt Peak	Spacewatch	·	1.1 km	MPC · JPL
874860	2021 SY_{33}	—	September 28, 2021	Haleakala	Pan-STARRS 2	MAR	740 m	MPC · JPL
874861	2021 SU_{38}	—	September 28, 2021	Haleakala	Pan-STARRS 2	·	1.2 km	MPC · JPL
874862	2021 SH_{42}	—	September 30, 2021	Haleakala	Pan-STARRS 2	HNS	610 m	MPC · JPL
874863	2021 SE_{49}	—	May 21, 2015	Haleakala	Pan-STARRS 1	·	1.2 km	MPC · JPL
874864	2021 SR_{58}	—	October 29, 2017	Mount Lemmon	Mount Lemmon Survey	·	1.1 km	MPC · JPL
874865	2021 SE_{91}	—	January 15, 2015	Haleakala	Pan-STARRS 1	·	1.1 km	MPC · JPL
874866	2021 TY_{9}	—	August 1, 2016	Haleakala	Pan-STARRS 1	·	1.1 km	MPC · JPL
874867	2021 TD_{10}	—	September 23, 2017	Haleakala	Pan-STARRS 1	MAR	550 m	MPC · JPL
874868	2021 TE_{14}	—	October 2, 2021	Haleakala	Pan-STARRS 2	APO	740 m	MPC · JPL
874869	2021 TN_{24}	—	September 23, 2008	Mount Lemmon	Mount Lemmon Survey	ADE	1.2 km	MPC · JPL
874870	2021 TT_{27}	—	September 17, 2009	Mount Lemmon	Mount Lemmon Survey	·	610 m	MPC · JPL
874871	2021 TC_{29}	—	August 12, 2020	Haleakala	Pan-STARRS 1	·	2.1 km	MPC · JPL
874872	2021 TN_{30}	—	October 28, 2017	Haleakala	Pan-STARRS 1	·	910 m	MPC · JPL
874873	2021 TH_{31}	—	October 23, 2008	Mount Lemmon	Mount Lemmon Survey	·	890 m	MPC · JPL
874874	2021 TN_{34}	—	October 18, 2012	Haleakala	Pan-STARRS 1	·	1.2 km	MPC · JPL
874875	2021 TV_{34}	—	October 3, 2021	Haleakala	Pan-STARRS 2	·	1.1 km	MPC · JPL
874876	2021 TR_{38}	—	August 14, 2012	Haleakala	Pan-STARRS 1	·	990 m	MPC · JPL
874877	2021 TP_{52}	—	October 3, 2021	Haleakala	Pan-STARRS 2	·	810 m	MPC · JPL
874878	2021 TJ_{56}	—	December 21, 2012	Mount Lemmon	Mount Lemmon Survey	·	1.3 km	MPC · JPL
874879	2021 TK_{57}	—	May 12, 2007	Mount Lemmon	Mount Lemmon Survey	·	1.2 km	MPC · JPL
874880	2021 TN_{63}	—	October 3, 2021	Haleakala	Pan-STARRS 2	·	1.3 km	MPC · JPL
874881	2021 TA_{66}	—	May 23, 2015	Cerro Tololo	DECam	·	1.2 km	MPC · JPL
874882	2021 TV_{83}	—	December 26, 2013	Mount Lemmon	Mount Lemmon Survey	EUN	790 m	MPC · JPL
874883	2021 TH_{86}	—	October 13, 2010	Kitt Peak	Spacewatch	·	2.0 km	MPC · JPL
874884	2021 TO_{87}	—	July 16, 2004	Cerro Tololo	Deep Ecliptic Survey	·	710 m	MPC · JPL
874885	2021 TO_{88}	—	October 8, 2008	Kitt Peak	Spacewatch	·	970 m	MPC · JPL
874886	2021 TD_{89}	—	October 11, 2021	Haleakala	Pan-STARRS 1	·	1.3 km	MPC · JPL
874887	2021 TG_{91}	—	September 19, 2003	Palomar	NEAT	·	990 m	MPC · JPL
874888	2021 TB_{99}	—	May 20, 2015	Cerro Tololo	DECam	·	1.4 km	MPC · JPL
874889	2021 TZ_{99}	—	June 23, 2015	Haleakala	Pan-STARRS 1	HNS	750 m	MPC · JPL
874890	2021 TX_{104}	—	May 25, 2019	Haleakala	Pan-STARRS 1	·	2.3 km	MPC · JPL
874891	2021 TG_{107}	—	October 5, 2021	Haleakala	Pan-STARRS 1	·	1.1 km	MPC · JPL
874892	2021 TH_{107}	—	October 13, 2021	Haleakala	Pan-STARRS 2	·	1.2 km	MPC · JPL
874893	2021 TK_{108}	—	October 30, 2010	Mount Lemmon	Mount Lemmon Survey	L4	4.7 km	MPC · JPL
874894	2021 TJ_{111}	—	August 26, 2012	Kitt Peak	Spacewatch	·	1.0 km	MPC · JPL
874895	2021 TB_{133}	—	October 8, 2008	Mount Lemmon	Mount Lemmon Survey	·	1.0 km	MPC · JPL
874896	2021 TT_{134}	—	October 11, 2021	Haleakala	Pan-STARRS 1	EUN	960 m	MPC · JPL
874897	2021 TM_{135}	—	July 11, 2016	Haleakala	Pan-STARRS 1	·	1.3 km	MPC · JPL
874898	2021 TB_{137}	—	October 2, 2021	Haleakala	Pan-STARRS 2	·	1.1 km	MPC · JPL
874899	2021 TU_{137}	—	June 29, 2020	Haleakala	Pan-STARRS 1	·	1.4 km	MPC · JPL
874900	2021 TV_{137}	—	October 5, 2021	Haleakala	Pan-STARRS 2	HNS	820 m	MPC · JPL

== 874901–875000 ==
back to top

Designation			Discovery			Properties		Ref
Permanent	Provisional	Named after	Date	Site	Discoverer(s)	Category	Diam.	Ref
874901	2021 TK_{138}	—	August 2, 2016	Haleakala	Pan-STARRS 1	·	1.3 km	MPC · JPL
874902	2021 TY_{166}	—	November 25, 2011	Nizhny Arkhyz	A. Novichonok, V. Gerke	L4	5.3 km	MPC · JPL
874903	2021 TZ_{169}	—	January 16, 2015	Haleakala	Pan-STARRS 1	·	1.0 km	MPC · JPL
874904	2021 TR_{210}	—	January 20, 2015	Haleakala	Pan-STARRS 1	·	1.2 km	MPC · JPL
874905	2021 TT_{211}	—	May 20, 2015	Cerro Tololo	DECam	·	1.1 km	MPC · JPL
874906	2021 UT_{8}	—	December 22, 2008	Mount Lemmon	Mount Lemmon Survey	·	1.6 km	MPC · JPL
874907	2021 UM_{10}	—	April 17, 2015	Cerro Tololo	DECam	·	1.1 km	MPC · JPL
874908	2021 UH_{13}	—	October 28, 2021	Mount Lemmon	Mount Lemmon Survey	·	1.3 km	MPC · JPL
874909	2021 UJ_{14}	—	September 22, 2008	Kitt Peak	Spacewatch	·	920 m	MPC · JPL
874910	2021 UJ_{15}	—	February 19, 2014	Kitt Peak	Spacewatch	·	1.2 km	MPC · JPL
874911	2021 UH_{17}	—	December 12, 2012	Mount Lemmon	Mount Lemmon Survey	DOR	1.7 km	MPC · JPL
874912	2021 UJ_{20}	—	July 9, 2018	Haleakala	Pan-STARRS 1	H	340 m	MPC · JPL
874913	2021 US_{20}	—	September 23, 2008	Mount Lemmon	Mount Lemmon Survey	·	1.0 km	MPC · JPL
874914	2021 UG_{22}	—	April 28, 2014	Cerro Tololo	DECam	·	1.3 km	MPC · JPL
874915	2021 UV_{24}	—	November 24, 2008	Kitt Peak	Spacewatch	·	1.2 km	MPC · JPL
874916	2021 UP_{25}	—	September 10, 2016	Mount Lemmon	Mount Lemmon Survey	·	1.4 km	MPC · JPL
874917	2021 UY_{28}	—	August 8, 2016	Haleakala	Pan-STARRS 1	·	1.1 km	MPC · JPL
874918	2021 UY_{32}	—	August 3, 2016	Haleakala	Pan-STARRS 1	·	1.1 km	MPC · JPL
874919	2021 UP_{34}	—	January 9, 2017	Mount Lemmon	Mount Lemmon Survey	·	2.3 km	MPC · JPL
874920	2021 UQ_{35}	—	January 12, 2018	Haleakala	Pan-STARRS 1	·	1.3 km	MPC · JPL
874921	2021 UK_{38}	—	October 17, 2012	Haleakala	Pan-STARRS 1	·	1.0 km	MPC · JPL
874922	2021 UH_{41}	—	July 11, 2016	Haleakala	Pan-STARRS 1	·	1.3 km	MPC · JPL
874923	2021 UC_{47}	—	November 9, 2008	Mount Lemmon	Mount Lemmon Survey	EUN	740 m	MPC · JPL
874924	2021 US_{47}	—	August 7, 2008	Kitt Peak	Spacewatch	(5)	940 m	MPC · JPL
874925	2021 UY_{47}	—	October 30, 2021	Haleakala	Pan-STARRS 1	·	1.2 km	MPC · JPL
874926	2021 UA_{49}	—	November 15, 2006	Mount Lemmon	Mount Lemmon Survey	·	1.7 km	MPC · JPL
874927	2021 UZ_{49}	—	December 5, 2008	Kitt Peak	Spacewatch	·	920 m	MPC · JPL
874928	2021 UX_{51}	—	August 2, 2016	Haleakala	Pan-STARRS 1	·	1.1 km	MPC · JPL
874929	2021 UK_{55}	—	October 31, 2021	Haleakala	Pan-STARRS 2	EUN	800 m	MPC · JPL
874930	2021 UN_{61}	—	October 1, 2005	Mount Lemmon	Mount Lemmon Survey	·	1.6 km	MPC · JPL
874931	2021 UX_{62}	—	April 18, 2015	Cerro Tololo	DECam	EUN	640 m	MPC · JPL
874932	2021 UD_{66}	—	July 23, 2020	Haleakala	Pan-STARRS 1	EOS	1.3 km	MPC · JPL
874933	2021 UZ_{82}	—	March 18, 2010	Kitt Peak	Spacewatch	·	1.1 km	MPC · JPL
874934	2021 UP_{89}	—	May 20, 2015	Cerro Tololo	DECam	·	940 m	MPC · JPL
874935	2021 US_{89}	—	February 15, 2013	Haleakala	Pan-STARRS 1	·	1.4 km	MPC · JPL
874936	2021 UY_{89}	—	June 3, 2019	Haleakala	Pan-STARRS 1	·	2.2 km	MPC · JPL
874937	2021 UK_{90}	—	July 4, 2019	Haleakala	Pan-STARRS 1	·	2.2 km	MPC · JPL
874938	2021 UU_{125}	—	October 31, 2021	Haleakala	Pan-STARRS 2	·	1.3 km	MPC · JPL
874939	2021 VS_{14}	—	January 10, 2014	Kitt Peak	Spacewatch	·	1.2 km	MPC · JPL
874940	2021 VY_{16}	—	April 3, 2016	Haleakala	Pan-STARRS 1	·	710 m	MPC · JPL
874941	2021 VJ_{18}	—	September 19, 2007	Kitt Peak	Spacewatch	·	1.0 km	MPC · JPL
874942	2021 VA_{20}	—	August 27, 2016	Haleakala	Pan-STARRS 1	·	1.5 km	MPC · JPL
874943	2021 VE_{23}	—	August 3, 2016	Haleakala	Pan-STARRS 1	·	1.0 km	MPC · JPL
874944	2021 VZ_{23}	—	January 17, 2015	Mount Lemmon	Mount Lemmon Survey	V	430 m	MPC · JPL
874945	2021 VQ_{25}	—	November 6, 2008	Kitt Peak	Spacewatch	·	980 m	MPC · JPL
874946	2021 VS_{25}	—	October 22, 2012	Mount Lemmon	Mount Lemmon Survey	·	960 m	MPC · JPL
874947	2021 VW_{28}	—	October 6, 2008	Mount Lemmon	Mount Lemmon Survey	·	890 m	MPC · JPL
874948	2021 VT_{31}	—	April 9, 2003	Kitt Peak	Spacewatch	·	1.1 km	MPC · JPL
874949	2021 VS_{38}	—	April 19, 2015	Cerro Tololo	DECam	L4 · ERY	5.1 km	MPC · JPL
874950	2021 VY_{39}	—	September 11, 2010	La Sagra	OAM	·	1.8 km	MPC · JPL
874951	2021 VQ_{41}	—	November 7, 2021	Mount Lemmon	Mount Lemmon Survey	(5)	880 m	MPC · JPL
874952	2021 VW_{42}	—	August 10, 2015	Haleakala	Pan-STARRS 1	·	1.8 km	MPC · JPL
874953	2021 VY_{42}	—	September 8, 2016	Haleakala	Pan-STARRS 1	·	1.2 km	MPC · JPL
874954	2021 VR_{43}	—	November 11, 2021	Haleakala	Pan-STARRS 1	TIR	1.8 km	MPC · JPL
874955	2021 VY_{45}	—	November 7, 2021	Haleakala	Pan-STARRS 1	·	980 m	MPC · JPL
874956	2021 VP_{46}	—	October 18, 2012	Haleakala	Pan-STARRS 1	WIT	640 m	MPC · JPL
874957	2021 VK_{48}	—	November 1, 2021	Haleakala	Pan-STARRS 1	·	2.1 km	MPC · JPL
874958	2021 VP_{48}	—	April 11, 2016	Haleakala	Pan-STARRS 1	·	1.1 km	MPC · JPL
874959	2021 VD_{62}	—	March 4, 2017	Haleakala	Pan-STARRS 1	VER	2.3 km	MPC · JPL
874960	2021 VJ_{62}	—	November 10, 2021	Haleakala	Pan-STARRS 1	·	1.7 km	MPC · JPL
874961	2021 VM_{62}	—	January 19, 2018	Mount Lemmon	Mount Lemmon Survey	HNS	730 m	MPC · JPL
874962	2021 VP_{63}	—	May 7, 2019	Haleakala	Pan-STARRS 1	JUN	690 m	MPC · JPL
874963	2021 VA_{64}	—	July 28, 2011	Haleakala	Pan-STARRS 1	·	1.3 km	MPC · JPL
874964	2021 VM_{64}	—	December 24, 2017	Haleakala	Pan-STARRS 1	·	1.4 km	MPC · JPL
874965	2021 VQ_{114}	—	December 21, 2012	Mount Lemmon	Mount Lemmon Survey	·	1.2 km	MPC · JPL
874966	2021 VR_{114}	—	August 12, 2020	Haleakala	Pan-STARRS 1	·	1.3 km	MPC · JPL
874967	2021 WE_{11}	—	October 9, 2016	Mount Lemmon	Mount Lemmon Survey	·	1.4 km	MPC · JPL
874968	2021 WU_{15}	—	August 30, 2016	Haleakala	Pan-STARRS 1	·	1.3 km	MPC · JPL
874969	2021 XM_{4}	—	May 30, 2019	Haleakala	Pan-STARRS 1	T_{j} (2.96)	2.3 km	MPC · JPL
874970	2021 XC_{8}	—	December 1, 2021	Kitt Peak-Bok	Bok NEO Survey	TEL	880 m	MPC · JPL
874971	2021 XO_{8}	—	December 3, 2021	Mount Lemmon	Mount Lemmon Survey	GAL	980 m	MPC · JPL
874972	2021 XF_{10}	—	December 7, 2021	Mount Lemmon	Mount Lemmon Survey	·	1.7 km	MPC · JPL
874973	2021 YK_{1}	—	November 14, 2010	Mount Lemmon	Mount Lemmon Survey	·	1.5 km	MPC · JPL
874974	2022 AC_{6}	—	January 7, 2022	Mount Lemmon	Mount Lemmon Survey	·	250 m	MPC · JPL
874975	2022 AL_{10}	—	October 9, 2016	Haleakala	Pan-STARRS 1	·	910 m	MPC · JPL
874976	2022 AO_{12}	—	January 7, 2022	Haleakala	Pan-STARRS 2	·	2.2 km	MPC · JPL
874977	2022 AG_{19}	—	February 21, 2007	Mount Lemmon	Mount Lemmon Survey	NYS	830 m	MPC · JPL
874978	2022 AA_{21}	—	January 7, 2022	Haleakala	Pan-STARRS 2	·	1.4 km	MPC · JPL
874979	2022 AD_{48}	—	March 2, 2017	Mount Lemmon	Mount Lemmon Survey	ELF	2.5 km	MPC · JPL
874980	2022 AW_{59}	—	September 16, 2020	Haleakala	Pan-STARRS 1	·	1.5 km	MPC · JPL
874981	2022 BZ_{5}	—	January 28, 2022	Haleakala	Pan-STARRS 2	APO	410 m	MPC · JPL
874982	2022 BU_{15}	—	May 18, 2012	Kitt Peak	Spacewatch	·	2.3 km	MPC · JPL
874983	2022 BE_{36}	—	October 16, 2020	Mount Lemmon	Mount Lemmon Survey	·	2.1 km	MPC · JPL
874984	2022 BC_{40}	—	January 31, 2022	Haleakala	Pan-STARRS 2	·	1.2 km	MPC · JPL
874985	2022 BF_{40}	—	February 5, 2011	Mount Lemmon	Mount Lemmon Survey	·	1.9 km	MPC · JPL
874986	2022 BW_{41}	—	January 26, 2022	Mount Lemmon	Mount Lemmon Survey	·	2.3 km	MPC · JPL
874987	2022 BM_{63}	—	January 31, 2022	Haleakala	Pan-STARRS 2	PHO	620 m	MPC · JPL
874988	2022 CP_{3}	—	October 1, 2014	Haleakala	Pan-STARRS 1	·	400 m	MPC · JPL
874989	2022 CD_{10}	—	October 21, 2014	Mount Lemmon	Mount Lemmon Survey	·	2.3 km	MPC · JPL
874990	2022 CC_{12}	—	December 1, 2016	Kitt Peak	Spacewatch	·	1.2 km	MPC · JPL
874991	2022 CQ_{21}	—	April 1, 2012	Mount Lemmon	Mount Lemmon Survey	·	490 m	MPC · JPL
874992	2022 CD_{37}	—	February 10, 2022	Haleakala	Pan-STARRS 2	·	2.2 km	MPC · JPL
874993	2022 CF_{46}	—	November 9, 2016	Mount Lemmon	Mount Lemmon Survey	·	1.5 km	MPC · JPL
874994	2022 DD_{8}	—	October 20, 2007	Kitt Peak	Spacewatch	HNS	750 m	MPC · JPL
874995	2022 DL_{15}	—	August 12, 2013	Haleakala	Pan-STARRS 1	·	450 m	MPC · JPL
874996	2022 DJ_{22}	—	February 27, 2022	Haleakala	Pan-STARRS 2	3:2	4.3 km	MPC · JPL
874997	2022 EF_{9}	—	February 27, 2017	Haleakala	Pan-STARRS 1	GEF	850 m	MPC · JPL
874998	2022 GK_{22}	—	November 3, 2007	Mount Lemmon	Mount Lemmon Survey	VER	2.0 km	MPC · JPL
874999	2022 HX_{4}	—	May 29, 2017	Haleakala	Pan-STARRS 1	T_{j} (2.98) · EUP	2.3 km	MPC · JPL
875000	2022 KY_{13}	—	May 22, 2022	Haleakala	Pan-STARRS 2	·	2.0 km	MPC · JPL

back to top
