= List of minor planets: 840001–841000 =

The following is a partial list of minor planets, running from minor-planet number 840001 through 841000, inclusive. The primary data for this and other partial lists is based on JPL's "Small-Body Orbital Elements" and data available from the Minor Planet Center. Critical list information is also provided by the MPC, unless otherwise specified from Lowell Observatory. A detailed description of the table's columns and additional sources are given on the main page including a complete list of every page in this series, and a statistical break-up on the dynamical classification of minor planets.

Also see the summary list of all named bodies in numerical and alphabetical order, and the corresponding naming citations for the number range of this particular list. New namings may only be added to this list after official publication, as the preannouncement of names is condemned by the Working Group for Small Bodies Nomenclature of the International Astronomical Union.

Near-Earth obj.	MBA (inner)	MBA (outer)	Centaur
Mars-crosser	MBA (middle)	Jupiter trojan	Trans-Neptunian obj.
Unclassified

== 840001–840100 ==
Designation			Discovery			Properties		Ref
Permanent	Provisional	Named after	Date	Site	Discoverer(s)	Category	Diam.	Ref
840001	2014 WT_{41}	—	September 26, 2000	Sacramento Peak	SDSS	·	1.5 km	MPC · JPL
840002	2014 WU_{42}	—	October 28, 2014	Haleakala	Pan-STARRS 1	EOS	1.5 km	MPC · JPL
840003	2014 WJ_{44}	—	October 25, 2014	Haleakala	Pan-STARRS 1	·	840 m	MPC · JPL
840004	2014 WT_{46}	—	October 29, 2003	Kitt Peak	Spacewatch	·	780 m	MPC · JPL
840005	2014 WS_{49}	—	April 3, 2010	WISE	WISE	THM	1.7 km	MPC · JPL
840006	2014 WA_{52}	—	October 25, 2014	Kitt Peak	Spacewatch	·	490 m	MPC · JPL
840007	2014 WS_{57}	—	April 14, 2010	WISE	WISE	·	3.0 km	MPC · JPL
840008	2014 WG_{66}	—	August 31, 2014	Haleakala	Pan-STARRS 1	·	1.6 km	MPC · JPL
840009	2014 WH_{66}	—	April 8, 2010	WISE	WISE	LIX	2.6 km	MPC · JPL
840010	2014 WV_{68}	—	May 30, 2006	Mount Lemmon	Mount Lemmon Survey	·	1.0 km	MPC · JPL
840011	2014 WK_{74}	—	March 5, 2002	Sacramento Peak	SDSS	·	830 m	MPC · JPL
840012	2014 WL_{74}	—	July 14, 2013	Haleakala	Pan-STARRS 1	·	1.6 km	MPC · JPL
840013	2014 WS_{74}	—	October 18, 2007	Kitt Peak	Spacewatch	·	430 m	MPC · JPL
840014	2014 WR_{76}	—	March 4, 2005	Mount Lemmon	Mount Lemmon Survey	THM	1.7 km	MPC · JPL
840015	2014 WG_{82}	—	August 31, 2014	Haleakala	Pan-STARRS 1	·	750 m	MPC · JPL
840016	2014 WD_{87}	—	October 25, 2014	Haleakala	Pan-STARRS 1	·	720 m	MPC · JPL
840017	2014 WR_{88}	—	October 20, 2008	Mount Lemmon	Mount Lemmon Survey	·	2.2 km	MPC · JPL
840018	2014 WW_{104}	—	March 7, 2010	WISE	WISE	·	3.0 km	MPC · JPL
840019	2014 WB_{106}	—	October 28, 2014	Haleakala	Pan-STARRS 1	BRA	1.4 km	MPC · JPL
840020	2014 WT_{106}	—	November 9, 2009	Mount Lemmon	Mount Lemmon Survey	·	2.4 km	MPC · JPL
840021	2014 WE_{111}	—	August 10, 2013	Kitt Peak	Spacewatch	·	2.1 km	MPC · JPL
840022	2014 WJ_{111}	—	November 18, 2014	Mount Lemmon	Mount Lemmon Survey	·	1.2 km	MPC · JPL
840023	2014 WF_{114}	—	August 29, 2014	Haleakala	Pan-STARRS 1	·	2.8 km	MPC · JPL
840024	2014 WL_{115}	—	October 3, 2014	Mount Lemmon	Mount Lemmon Survey	·	1.9 km	MPC · JPL
840025	2014 WK_{116}	—	September 19, 2014	Haleakala	Pan-STARRS 1	THM	1.8 km	MPC · JPL
840026	2014 WM_{116}	—	September 19, 2014	Haleakala	Pan-STARRS 1	THM	1.8 km	MPC · JPL
840027	2014 WZ_{116}	—	April 16, 2010	WISE	WISE	T_{j} (2.94)	2.6 km	MPC · JPL
840028	2014 WO_{120}	—	June 28, 2003	Kitt Peak	Spacewatch	H	430 m	MPC · JPL
840029	2014 WH_{121}	—	September 4, 2014	Haleakala	Pan-STARRS 1	·	2.9 km	MPC · JPL
840030	2014 WV_{130}	—	November 17, 2014	Haleakala	Pan-STARRS 1	L5	5.9 km	MPC · JPL
840031	2014 WD_{134}	—	November 5, 2007	Mount Lemmon	Mount Lemmon Survey	·	620 m	MPC · JPL
840032	2014 WB_{135}	—	November 17, 2014	Haleakala	Pan-STARRS 1	·	730 m	MPC · JPL
840033	2014 WA_{140}	—	November 17, 2014	Haleakala	Pan-STARRS 1	KOR	1.0 km	MPC · JPL
840034	2014 WU_{149}	—	October 25, 2014	Mount Lemmon	Mount Lemmon Survey	·	410 m	MPC · JPL
840035	2014 WJ_{152}	—	August 31, 2014	Haleakala	Pan-STARRS 1	·	1.4 km	MPC · JPL
840036	2014 WG_{158}	—	August 25, 2014	Haleakala	Pan-STARRS 1	·	1.6 km	MPC · JPL
840037	2014 WP_{159}	—	October 25, 2014	Haleakala	Pan-STARRS 1	·	2.2 km	MPC · JPL
840038	2014 WH_{161}	—	November 18, 2014	Mount Lemmon	Mount Lemmon Survey	·	2.5 km	MPC · JPL
840039	2014 WG_{165}	—	April 11, 2010	WISE	WISE	·	2.8 km	MPC · JPL
840040	2014 WL_{165}	—	April 5, 2010	WISE	WISE	·	3.4 km	MPC · JPL
840041	2014 WL_{167}	—	April 14, 2010	WISE	WISE	·	3.0 km	MPC · JPL
840042	2014 WO_{170}	—	July 16, 2010	WISE	WISE	·	2.8 km	MPC · JPL
840043	2014 WK_{173}	—	August 2, 2010	WISE	WISE	·	1.4 km	MPC · JPL
840044	2014 WW_{173}	—	November 20, 2014	Mount Lemmon	Mount Lemmon Survey	·	1.9 km	MPC · JPL
840045	2014 WA_{175}	—	April 10, 2013	Haleakala	Pan-STARRS 1	·	960 m	MPC · JPL
840046	2014 WZ_{176}	—	October 21, 2014	Catalina	CSS	H	430 m	MPC · JPL
840047	2014 WP_{180}	—	March 2, 2010	WISE	WISE	TIR	2.0 km	MPC · JPL
840048	2014 WO_{181}	—	October 2, 2014	Haleakala	Pan-STARRS 1	·	620 m	MPC · JPL
840049	2014 WH_{183}	—	November 21, 2015	Mount Lemmon	Mount Lemmon Survey	L5	6.9 km	MPC · JPL
840050	2014 WP_{183}	—	April 2, 2010	WISE	WISE	TIR	2.1 km	MPC · JPL
840051	2014 WZ_{183}	—	November 19, 2009	Kitt Peak	Spacewatch	·	2.4 km	MPC · JPL
840052	2014 WJ_{184}	—	August 19, 2006	Kitt Peak	Spacewatch	·	990 m	MPC · JPL
840053	2014 WQ_{189}	—	November 20, 2014	Haleakala	Pan-STARRS 1	·	1.3 km	MPC · JPL
840054	2014 WC_{190}	—	November 20, 2014	Haleakala	Pan-STARRS 1	·	900 m	MPC · JPL
840055	2014 WG_{191}	—	November 20, 2014	Haleakala	Pan-STARRS 1	·	2.0 km	MPC · JPL
840056	2014 WV_{192}	—	March 4, 2010	WISE	WISE	·	1.6 km	MPC · JPL
840057	2014 WQ_{193}	—	April 8, 2010	WISE	WISE	·	3.5 km	MPC · JPL
840058	2014 WS_{193}	—	December 20, 2009	Mount Lemmon	Mount Lemmon Survey	EMA	1.9 km	MPC · JPL
840059	2014 WA_{197}	—	November 21, 2014	Mount Lemmon	Mount Lemmon Survey	·	2.1 km	MPC · JPL
840060	2014 WG_{198}	—	September 20, 2014	Haleakala	Pan-STARRS 1	·	1.1 km	MPC · JPL
840061	2014 WM_{200}	—	November 20, 2009	Kitt Peak	Spacewatch	H	370 m	MPC · JPL
840062	2014 WK_{207}	—	September 22, 2009	Mount Lemmon	Mount Lemmon Survey	·	1.4 km	MPC · JPL
840063	2014 WW_{221}	—	September 30, 2014	Mount Lemmon	Mount Lemmon Survey	NYS	850 m	MPC · JPL
840064	2014 WL_{226}	—	November 18, 2014	Haleakala	Pan-STARRS 1	·	1.3 km	MPC · JPL
840065	2014 WG_{227}	—	November 18, 2014	Haleakala	Pan-STARRS 1	·	2.3 km	MPC · JPL
840066	2014 WO_{232}	—	June 18, 2013	Haleakala	Pan-STARRS 1	·	2.0 km	MPC · JPL
840067	2014 WL_{233}	—	January 16, 2004	Kitt Peak	Spacewatch	·	720 m	MPC · JPL
840068	2014 WU_{234}	—	April 29, 2010	WISE	WISE	EUP	5.0 km	MPC · JPL
840069	2014 WJ_{243}	—	September 21, 2003	Anderson Mesa	LONEOS	·	1.9 km	MPC · JPL
840070	2014 WQ_{251}	—	October 31, 2014	Mount Lemmon	Mount Lemmon Survey	·	980 m	MPC · JPL
840071	2014 WT_{254}	—	December 20, 2009	Kitt Peak	Spacewatch	·	2.4 km	MPC · JPL
840072	2014 WQ_{255}	—	September 24, 2008	Kitt Peak	Spacewatch	·	1.9 km	MPC · JPL
840073	2014 WV_{255}	—	March 8, 2010	WISE	WISE	·	2.6 km	MPC · JPL
840074	2014 WQ_{258}	—	April 16, 2010	WISE	WISE	·	2.4 km	MPC · JPL
840075	2014 WS_{262}	—	March 9, 2010	WISE	WISE	·	1.7 km	MPC · JPL
840076	2014 WY_{263}	—	April 12, 2011	Mount Lemmon	Mount Lemmon Survey	·	2.1 km	MPC · JPL
840077	2014 WB_{267}	—	November 21, 2014	Haleakala	Pan-STARRS 1	·	1.8 km	MPC · JPL
840078	2014 WP_{267}	—	November 21, 2014	Haleakala	Pan-STARRS 1	·	1.9 km	MPC · JPL
840079	2014 WQ_{269}	—	March 21, 2010	WISE	WISE	·	1.8 km	MPC · JPL
840080	2014 WS_{271}	—	November 21, 2014	Haleakala	Pan-STARRS 1	EOS	1.3 km	MPC · JPL
840081	2014 WF_{275}	—	November 21, 2014	Haleakala	Pan-STARRS 1	·	930 m	MPC · JPL
840082	2014 WK_{278}	—	November 21, 2014	Haleakala	Pan-STARRS 1	EOS	1.1 km	MPC · JPL
840083	2014 WQ_{280}	—	November 21, 2014	Haleakala	Pan-STARRS 1	·	840 m	MPC · JPL
840084	2014 WC_{285}	—	November 21, 2014	Haleakala	Pan-STARRS 1	·	1.1 km	MPC · JPL
840085	2014 WF_{285}	—	October 5, 2002	Sacramento Peak	SDSS	·	3.2 km	MPC · JPL
840086	2014 WA_{294}	—	November 21, 2014	Haleakala	Pan-STARRS 1	·	1.1 km	MPC · JPL
840087	2014 WU_{299}	—	November 17, 2009	Kitt Peak	Spacewatch	·	3.2 km	MPC · JPL
840088	2014 WB_{301}	—	November 16, 2003	Kitt Peak	Spacewatch	·	1.9 km	MPC · JPL
840089	2014 WX_{304}	—	September 24, 2008	Mount Lemmon	Mount Lemmon Survey	TIR	2.2 km	MPC · JPL
840090	2014 WP_{306}	—	February 27, 2010	WISE	WISE	·	1.3 km	MPC · JPL
840091	2014 WE_{312}	—	December 31, 2007	Kitt Peak	Spacewatch	·	820 m	MPC · JPL
840092	2014 WP_{312}	—	November 20, 2009	Kitt Peak	Spacewatch	·	3.3 km	MPC · JPL
840093	2014 WJ_{313}	—	September 28, 2014	Haleakala	Pan-STARRS 1	critical	1.8 km	MPC · JPL
840094	2014 WA_{314}	—	March 15, 2010	WISE	WISE	·	2.0 km	MPC · JPL
840095	2014 WJ_{322}	—	October 28, 2014	Mount Lemmon	Mount Lemmon Survey	·	2.3 km	MPC · JPL
840096	2014 WV_{322}	—	February 17, 2007	Mount Lemmon	Mount Lemmon Survey	·	900 m	MPC · JPL
840097	2014 WW_{324}	—	October 29, 2014	Haleakala	Pan-STARRS 1	EOS	1.3 km	MPC · JPL
840098	2014 WK_{325}	—	October 5, 2002	Sacramento Peak	SDSS	·	3.1 km	MPC · JPL
840099	2014 WR_{326}	—	October 29, 2014	Haleakala	Pan-STARRS 1	·	1.3 km	MPC · JPL
840100	2014 WN_{332}	—	August 31, 2014	Haleakala	Pan-STARRS 1	·	2.2 km	MPC · JPL

== 840101–840200 ==
back to top

Designation			Discovery			Properties		Ref
Permanent	Provisional	Named after	Date	Site	Discoverer(s)	Category	Diam.	Ref
840101	2014 WU_{332}	—	November 22, 2014	Haleakala	Pan-STARRS 1	·	1.2 km	MPC · JPL
840102	2014 WO_{335}	—	January 16, 2011	Mount Lemmon	Mount Lemmon Survey	·	1.2 km	MPC · JPL
840103	2014 WP_{338}	—	September 18, 2014	Haleakala	Pan-STARRS 1	·	1.7 km	MPC · JPL
840104	2014 WT_{338}	—	September 20, 2014	Haleakala	Pan-STARRS 1	T_{j} (2.98)	1.9 km	MPC · JPL
840105	2014 WY_{338}	—	April 20, 2010	WISE	WISE	·	2.5 km	MPC · JPL
840106	2014 WX_{340}	—	October 10, 2002	Sacramento Peak	SDSS	·	2.3 km	MPC · JPL
840107	2014 WY_{342}	—	October 29, 2014	Haleakala	Pan-STARRS 1	·	1.3 km	MPC · JPL
840108	2014 WK_{343}	—	November 22, 2014	Haleakala	Pan-STARRS 1	·	530 m	MPC · JPL
840109	2014 WR_{346}	—	September 5, 2000	Sacramento Peak	SDSS	·	1.4 km	MPC · JPL
840110	2014 WT_{350}	—	November 23, 2014	Haleakala	Pan-STARRS 1	T_{j} (2.99) · 3:2	4.1 km	MPC · JPL
840111	2014 WV_{350}	—	October 26, 2009	Mount Lemmon	Mount Lemmon Survey	·	3.2 km	MPC · JPL
840112	2014 WR_{354}	—	March 21, 1999	Sacramento Peak	SDSS	·	2.7 km	MPC · JPL
840113	2014 WJ_{355}	—	December 3, 2008	Catalina	CSS	·	3.1 km	MPC · JPL
840114	2014 WX_{360}	—	November 19, 2003	Palomar	NEAT	TIR	3.9 km	MPC · JPL
840115	2014 WD_{361}	—	October 22, 2014	Catalina	CSS	·	1.8 km	MPC · JPL
840116	2014 WU_{371}	—	October 21, 2009	Mount Lemmon	Mount Lemmon Survey	·	1.6 km	MPC · JPL
840117	2014 WO_{372}	—	March 19, 2009	Kitt Peak	Spacewatch	·	490 m	MPC · JPL
840118	2014 WT_{378}	—	November 1, 2014	Mount Lemmon	Mount Lemmon Survey	·	2.3 km	MPC · JPL
840119	2014 WO_{381}	—	November 27, 2009	Mount Lemmon	Mount Lemmon Survey	·	3.7 km	MPC · JPL
840120	2014 WS_{382}	—	November 17, 2014	Mount Lemmon	Mount Lemmon Survey	·	1.8 km	MPC · JPL
840121	2014 WD_{383}	—	March 20, 1999	Sacramento Peak	SDSS	·	1.1 km	MPC · JPL
840122	2014 WX_{384}	—	November 23, 2014	Mount Lemmon	Mount Lemmon Survey	·	830 m	MPC · JPL
840123	2014 WG_{385}	—	September 20, 2014	Haleakala	Pan-STARRS 1	LUT	3.2 km	MPC · JPL
840124	2014 WA_{388}	—	November 23, 2014	Haleakala	Pan-STARRS 1	L5	5.4 km	MPC · JPL
840125	2014 WK_{389}	—	November 21, 2014	Haleakala	Pan-STARRS 1	·	1.2 km	MPC · JPL
840126	2014 WS_{390}	—	May 7, 2010	WISE	WISE	·	2.5 km	MPC · JPL
840127	2014 WR_{393}	—	November 9, 2014	Mount Lemmon	Mount Lemmon Survey	·	2.0 km	MPC · JPL
840128	2014 WL_{395}	—	April 8, 2010	WISE	WISE	·	1.8 km	MPC · JPL
840129	2014 WP_{395}	—	February 7, 2010	WISE	WISE	·	2.0 km	MPC · JPL
840130	2014 WW_{403}	—	February 13, 2010	Mount Lemmon	Mount Lemmon Survey	·	2.6 km	MPC · JPL
840131	2014 WW_{405}	—	July 16, 2013	Haleakala	Pan-STARRS 1	·	2.2 km	MPC · JPL
840132	2014 WG_{407}	—	November 26, 2014	Haleakala	Pan-STARRS 1	·	680 m	MPC · JPL
840133	2014 WW_{408}	—	March 20, 2010	WISE	WISE	·	2.6 km	MPC · JPL
840134	2014 WO_{409}	—	October 10, 2002	Sacramento Peak	SDSS	·	2.8 km	MPC · JPL
840135	2014 WO_{411}	—	November 26, 2014	Haleakala	Pan-STARRS 1	·	1.9 km	MPC · JPL
840136	2014 WQ_{411}	—	March 21, 1999	Sacramento Peak	SDSS	·	980 m	MPC · JPL
840137	2014 WX_{415}	—	March 15, 2012	Mount Lemmon	Mount Lemmon Survey	·	880 m	MPC · JPL
840138	2014 WU_{416}	—	December 20, 2009	Mount Lemmon	Mount Lemmon Survey	LIX	2.6 km	MPC · JPL
840139	2014 WU_{417}	—	October 31, 2010	Mount Lemmon	Mount Lemmon Survey	·	780 m	MPC · JPL
840140	2014 WJ_{419}	—	May 11, 2010	Kitt Peak	Spacewatch	THB	2.3 km	MPC · JPL
840141	2014 WL_{419}	—	April 16, 2010	WISE	WISE	EUP	2.4 km	MPC · JPL
840142	2014 WQ_{419}	—	April 19, 2010	WISE	WISE	·	1.9 km	MPC · JPL
840143	2014 WS_{419}	—	September 28, 2003	Anderson Mesa	LONEOS	·	1.9 km	MPC · JPL
840144	2014 WS_{423}	—	March 10, 2005	Anderson Mesa	LONEOS	·	2.2 km	MPC · JPL
840145	2014 WP_{424}	—	March 14, 2010	Catalina	CSS	·	3.1 km	MPC · JPL
840146	2014 WD_{425}	—	October 29, 2009	Kitt Peak	Spacewatch	·	1.9 km	MPC · JPL
840147	2014 WK_{426}	—	April 3, 2010	WISE	WISE	·	1.7 km	MPC · JPL
840148	2014 WL_{426}	—	May 12, 2010	WISE	WISE	·	2.5 km	MPC · JPL
840149	2014 WS_{430}	—	April 11, 2010	WISE	WISE	·	1.8 km	MPC · JPL
840150	2014 WX_{430}	—	May 1, 2010	WISE	WISE	·	2.6 km	MPC · JPL
840151	2014 WH_{432}	—	March 4, 2006	Mount Lemmon	Mount Lemmon Survey	·	1.6 km	MPC · JPL
840152	2014 WK_{440}	—	November 27, 2014	Haleakala	Pan-STARRS 1	EOS	1.2 km	MPC · JPL
840153	2014 WR_{449}	—	August 19, 2001	Cerro Tololo	Deep Ecliptic Survey	·	440 m	MPC · JPL
840154	2014 WA_{450}	—	November 27, 2014	Haleakala	Pan-STARRS 1	NEM	1.3 km	MPC · JPL
840155	2014 WB_{451}	—	December 19, 2009	Kitt Peak	Spacewatch	·	3.8 km	MPC · JPL
840156	2014 WL_{454}	—	October 24, 2009	Mount Lemmon	Mount Lemmon Survey	·	2.4 km	MPC · JPL
840157	2014 WC_{455}	—	February 19, 2010	WISE	WISE	·	1.7 km	MPC · JPL
840158	2014 WF_{457}	—	November 24, 2009	Kitt Peak	Spacewatch	·	1.5 km	MPC · JPL
840159	2014 WW_{458}	—	November 21, 2003	Kitt Peak	Spacewatch	·	1.2 km	MPC · JPL
840160	2014 WH_{459}	—	March 4, 2012	Mount Lemmon	Mount Lemmon Survey	·	640 m	MPC · JPL
840161	2014 WU_{465}	—	December 5, 2007	Kitt Peak	Spacewatch	·	650 m	MPC · JPL
840162	2014 WO_{468}	—	November 27, 2014	Haleakala	Pan-STARRS 1	·	1.2 km	MPC · JPL
840163	2014 WN_{469}	—	November 19, 2008	Mount Lemmon	Mount Lemmon Survey	·	2.9 km	MPC · JPL
840164	2014 WR_{469}	—	January 26, 2010	WISE	WISE	EUP	3.0 km	MPC · JPL
840165	2014 WT_{470}	—	January 28, 2011	Mount Lemmon	Mount Lemmon Survey	·	1.1 km	MPC · JPL
840166	2014 WQ_{480}	—	November 28, 2014	Haleakala	Pan-STARRS 1	(895)	3.4 km	MPC · JPL
840167	2014 WN_{481}	—	November 7, 2008	Mount Lemmon	Mount Lemmon Survey	EMA	2.5 km	MPC · JPL
840168	2014 WC_{482}	—	November 29, 2014	Mount Lemmon	Mount Lemmon Survey	·	2.8 km	MPC · JPL
840169	2014 WO_{482}	—	November 27, 2014	Haleakala	Pan-STARRS 1	·	2.5 km	MPC · JPL
840170	2014 WK_{483}	—	February 23, 2012	Mount Lemmon	Mount Lemmon Survey	·	570 m	MPC · JPL
840171	2014 WR_{490}	—	May 28, 2010	WISE	WISE	·	2.4 km	MPC · JPL
840172	2014 WR_{492}	—	November 4, 2014	Mount Lemmon	Mount Lemmon Survey	·	1.3 km	MPC · JPL
840173	2014 WF_{493}	—	February 17, 2004	Kitt Peak	Spacewatch	THB	2.4 km	MPC · JPL
840174	2014 WH_{493}	—	November 30, 2014	Haleakala	Pan-STARRS 1	H	460 m	MPC · JPL
840175	2014 WQ_{493}	—	November 28, 2014	Haleakala	Pan-STARRS 1	·	2.6 km	MPC · JPL
840176	2014 WR_{493}	—	October 28, 2013	Kitt Peak	Spacewatch	·	2.8 km	MPC · JPL
840177	2014 WA_{499}	—	May 1, 2010	WISE	WISE	T_{j} (2.97) · EUP	3.0 km	MPC · JPL
840178	2014 WC_{500}	—	March 30, 2010	WISE	WISE	·	3.3 km	MPC · JPL
840179	2014 WB_{507}	—	September 24, 2009	Mount Lemmon	Mount Lemmon Survey	·	3.7 km	MPC · JPL
840180	2014 WK_{511}	—	October 4, 2002	Sacramento Peak	SDSS	L5	7.4 km	MPC · JPL
840181	2014 WR_{511}	—	February 9, 2005	Kitt Peak	Spacewatch	H	380 m	MPC · JPL
840182	2014 WW_{512}	—	November 21, 2014	Haleakala	Pan-STARRS 1	·	940 m	MPC · JPL
840183	2014 WU_{513}	—	May 21, 2010	WISE	WISE	EUP	3.2 km	MPC · JPL
840184	2014 WD_{514}	—	November 21, 2014	Haleakala	Pan-STARRS 1	·	1.9 km	MPC · JPL
840185	2014 WA_{515}	—	October 5, 2013	Mount Lemmon	Mount Lemmon Survey	·	2.2 km	MPC · JPL
840186	2014 WE_{515}	—	November 30, 2014	Haleakala	Pan-STARRS 1	·	2.0 km	MPC · JPL
840187	2014 WY_{515}	—	March 20, 1999	Sacramento Peak	SDSS	·	3.4 km	MPC · JPL
840188	2014 WV_{516}	—	November 17, 2014	Haleakala	Pan-STARRS 1	·	1.1 km	MPC · JPL
840189	2014 WB_{519}	—	October 10, 2008	Mount Lemmon	Mount Lemmon Survey	·	2.0 km	MPC · JPL
840190	2014 WE_{519}	—	October 24, 2003	Sacramento Peak	SDSS	·	1.7 km	MPC · JPL
840191	2014 WO_{520}	—	September 27, 2009	Mount Lemmon	Mount Lemmon Survey	·	1.0 km	MPC · JPL
840192	2014 WX_{522}	—	March 22, 2012	Mount Lemmon	Mount Lemmon Survey	·	1 km	MPC · JPL
840193	2014 WA_{523}	—	October 29, 2014	Kitt Peak	Spacewatch	·	1.9 km	MPC · JPL
840194	2014 WO_{527}	—	August 14, 2013	Haleakala	Pan-STARRS 1	·	1.3 km	MPC · JPL
840195	2014 WP_{528}	—	October 20, 2008	Kitt Peak	Spacewatch	·	1.9 km	MPC · JPL
840196	2014 WV_{528}	—	November 22, 2014	Haleakala	Pan-STARRS 1	·	2.3 km	MPC · JPL
840197	2014 WO_{530}	—	November 26, 2014	Mount Lemmon	Mount Lemmon Survey	·	3.0 km	MPC · JPL
840198	2014 WN_{532}	—	September 24, 1960	Palomar Mountain	C. J. van Houten, I. van Houten-Groeneveld, T. Gehrels	KON	2.3 km	MPC · JPL
840199	2014 WV_{536}	—	November 26, 2014	Haleakala	Pan-STARRS 1	·	560 m	MPC · JPL
840200	2014 WF_{537}	—	November 30, 2014	Mount Lemmon	Mount Lemmon Survey	·	1.2 km	MPC · JPL

== 840201–840300 ==
back to top

Designation			Discovery			Properties		Ref
Permanent	Provisional	Named after	Date	Site	Discoverer(s)	Category	Diam.	Ref
840201	2014 WO_{538}	—	March 28, 2010	WISE	WISE	·	2.1 km	MPC · JPL
840202	2014 WT_{539}	—	November 16, 2014	Mount Lemmon	Mount Lemmon Survey	·	1.6 km	MPC · JPL
840203	2014 WF_{540}	—	November 26, 2014	Haleakala	Pan-STARRS 1	URS	2.4 km	MPC · JPL
840204	2014 WN_{540}	—	March 26, 2010	WISE	WISE	·	2.5 km	MPC · JPL
840205	2014 WU_{540}	—	November 21, 2014	Haleakala	Pan-STARRS 1	·	2.1 km	MPC · JPL
840206	2014 WV_{540}	—	November 25, 2014	Haleakala	Pan-STARRS 1	·	2.3 km	MPC · JPL
840207	2014 WQ_{543}	—	January 15, 2010	WISE	WISE	·	2.8 km	MPC · JPL
840208	2014 WE_{544}	—	March 21, 2010	WISE	WISE	·	1.3 km	MPC · JPL
840209	2014 WN_{545}	—	April 12, 2010	WISE	WISE	EUP	2.1 km	MPC · JPL
840210	2014 WS_{545}	—	November 26, 2014	Haleakala	Pan-STARRS 1	·	2.4 km	MPC · JPL
840211	2014 WQ_{546}	—	November 17, 2014	Mount Lemmon	Mount Lemmon Survey	EOS	1.3 km	MPC · JPL
840212	2014 WF_{547}	—	November 19, 2014	Haleakala	Pan-STARRS 1	·	1.7 km	MPC · JPL
840213	2014 WM_{550}	—	October 25, 2003	Kitt Peak	Spacewatch	EOS	1.2 km	MPC · JPL
840214	2014 WC_{551}	—	April 12, 2016	Haleakala	Pan-STARRS 1	·	490 m	MPC · JPL
840215	2014 WN_{551}	—	March 7, 2016	Haleakala	Pan-STARRS 1	·	640 m	MPC · JPL
840216	2014 WB_{555}	—	November 26, 2014	Haleakala	Pan-STARRS 1	·	2.4 km	MPC · JPL
840217	2014 WF_{556}	—	January 3, 2016	Haleakala	Pan-STARRS 1	·	2.6 km	MPC · JPL
840218	2014 WW_{565}	—	November 21, 2014	Haleakala	Pan-STARRS 1	·	2.6 km	MPC · JPL
840219	2014 WQ_{566}	—	November 28, 2014	Kitt Peak	Spacewatch	·	1.8 km	MPC · JPL
840220	2014 WL_{568}	—	November 20, 2014	Mount Lemmon	Mount Lemmon Survey	·	910 m	MPC · JPL
840221	2014 WZ_{569}	—	November 26, 2014	Haleakala	Pan-STARRS 1	·	1.1 km	MPC · JPL
840222	2014 WJ_{571}	—	November 22, 2014	Mount Lemmon	Mount Lemmon Survey	·	1.2 km	MPC · JPL
840223	2014 WY_{571}	—	November 17, 2014	Haleakala	Pan-STARRS 1	EOS	1.1 km	MPC · JPL
840224	2014 WP_{574}	—	November 23, 2014	Mount Lemmon	Mount Lemmon Survey	·	1.0 km	MPC · JPL
840225	2014 WW_{574}	—	November 21, 2014	Catalina	CSS	T_{j} (2.99)	3.0 km	MPC · JPL
840226	2014 WS_{575}	—	November 16, 2014	Mount Lemmon	Mount Lemmon Survey	·	750 m	MPC · JPL
840227	2014 WJ_{576}	—	November 17, 2014	Mount Lemmon	Mount Lemmon Survey	·	890 m	MPC · JPL
840228	2014 WN_{579}	—	November 26, 2014	Haleakala	Pan-STARRS 1	·	1.1 km	MPC · JPL
840229	2014 WP_{579}	—	November 20, 2014	Haleakala	Pan-STARRS 1	·	520 m	MPC · JPL
840230	2014 WV_{580}	—	November 20, 2014	Mount Lemmon	Mount Lemmon Survey	EOS	1.2 km	MPC · JPL
840231	2014 WC_{584}	—	November 18, 2014	Haleakala	Pan-STARRS 1	H	480 m	MPC · JPL
840232	2014 WJ_{585}	—	November 16, 2014	Haleakala	Pan-STARRS 1	·	2.3 km	MPC · JPL
840233	2014 WY_{589}	—	November 26, 2014	Haleakala	Pan-STARRS 1	·	1.7 km	MPC · JPL
840234	2014 WR_{590}	—	November 16, 2014	Mount Lemmon	Mount Lemmon Survey	L5	6.6 km	MPC · JPL
840235	2014 WK_{593}	—	November 21, 2014	Haleakala	Pan-STARRS 1	L5	6.5 km	MPC · JPL
840236	2014 WL_{606}	—	November 27, 2014	Kitt Peak	Spacewatch	·	490 m	MPC · JPL
840237	2014 WM_{616}	—	November 26, 2014	Haleakala	Pan-STARRS 1	L5	7.4 km	MPC · JPL
840238	2014 XJ_{1}	—	December 1, 2014	Haleakala	Pan-STARRS 1	·	1.2 km	MPC · JPL
840239	2014 XT_{1}	—	December 8, 2010	Mount Lemmon	Mount Lemmon Survey	·	920 m	MPC · JPL
840240	2014 XX_{3}	—	February 1, 2010	WISE	WISE	·	1.8 km	MPC · JPL
840241	2014 XK_{4}	—	July 3, 2014	Haleakala	Pan-STARRS 1	·	2.3 km	MPC · JPL
840242	2014 XE_{8}	—	October 27, 2005	Kitt Peak	Spacewatch	·	1.1 km	MPC · JPL
840243	2014 XR_{8}	—	November 24, 2014	Catalina	CSS	H	420 m	MPC · JPL
840244	2014 XH_{9}	—	October 7, 2008	Mount Lemmon	Mount Lemmon Survey	·	2.5 km	MPC · JPL
840245	2014 XX_{13}	—	October 17, 2010	Mount Lemmon	Mount Lemmon Survey	NYS	800 m	MPC · JPL
840246	2014 XE_{21}	—	November 17, 2014	Haleakala	Pan-STARRS 1	·	610 m	MPC · JPL
840247	2014 XH_{23}	—	November 26, 2014	Haleakala	Pan-STARRS 1	·	530 m	MPC · JPL
840248	2014 XP_{25}	—	November 29, 2014	Mount Lemmon	Mount Lemmon Survey	·	1.0 km	MPC · JPL
840249	2014 XW_{26}	—	June 10, 2010	WISE	WISE	·	3.8 km	MPC · JPL
840250	2014 XQ_{31}	—	January 8, 2010	Kitt Peak	Spacewatch	T_{j} (2.99)	3.2 km	MPC · JPL
840251	2014 XP_{34}	—	February 27, 2012	Haleakala	Pan-STARRS 1	·	700 m	MPC · JPL
840252	2014 XL_{36}	—	February 2, 2006	Mount Lemmon	Mount Lemmon Survey	DOR	2.0 km	MPC · JPL
840253	2014 XA_{37}	—	November 21, 2009	Mount Lemmon	Mount Lemmon Survey	·	2.1 km	MPC · JPL
840254	2014 XN_{38}	—	February 23, 2010	WISE	WISE	T_{j} (2.95)	3.0 km	MPC · JPL
840255	2014 XR_{41}	—	May 2, 2010	WISE	WISE	·	4.2 km	MPC · JPL
840256	2014 XW_{42}	—	June 25, 2010	WISE	WISE	LUT	2.9 km	MPC · JPL
840257	2014 XG_{45}	—	May 3, 2010	WISE	WISE	EUP	3.4 km	MPC · JPL
840258	2014 XN_{47}	—	June 13, 2010	WISE	WISE	·	2.5 km	MPC · JPL
840259	2014 XZ_{49}	—	December 10, 2014	Mount Lemmon	Mount Lemmon Survey	·	1.1 km	MPC · JPL
840260	2014 XD_{50}	—	December 3, 2014	Haleakala	Pan-STARRS 1	·	1.5 km	MPC · JPL
840261	2014 XE_{50}	—	December 12, 2014	Haleakala	Pan-STARRS 1	KON	1.7 km	MPC · JPL
840262	2014 XE_{60}	—	May 31, 2019	Haleakala	Pan-STARRS 1	·	2.0 km	MPC · JPL
840263	2014 YN_{1}	—	January 11, 2010	Kitt Peak	Spacewatch	·	2.2 km	MPC · JPL
840264	2014 YY_{1}	—	April 5, 2011	Mount Lemmon	Mount Lemmon Survey	·	1.2 km	MPC · JPL
840265	2014 YM_{4}	—	May 24, 2010	WISE	WISE	·	5.1 km	MPC · JPL
840266	2014 YO_{4}	—	November 26, 2014	Haleakala	Pan-STARRS 1	H	400 m	MPC · JPL
840267	2014 YR_{5}	—	May 20, 2010	WISE	WISE	·	4.3 km	MPC · JPL
840268	2014 YC_{6}	—	November 4, 2014	Mount Lemmon	Mount Lemmon Survey	EUP	3.2 km	MPC · JPL
840269	2014 YE_{6}	—	November 21, 2009	Mount Lemmon	Mount Lemmon Survey	·	3.8 km	MPC · JPL
840270	2014 YE_{7}	—	June 18, 2010	WISE	WISE	T_{j} (2.96)	2.0 km	MPC · JPL
840271	2014 YF_{7}	—	May 20, 2010	WISE	WISE	·	1.8 km	MPC · JPL
840272	2014 YW_{8}	—	March 28, 2008	Mount Lemmon	Mount Lemmon Survey	·	430 m	MPC · JPL
840273	2014 YE_{12}	—	January 15, 2004	Kitt Peak	Spacewatch	·	2.4 km	MPC · JPL
840274	2014 YO_{12}	—	September 30, 2009	Mount Lemmon	Mount Lemmon Survey	·	1.3 km	MPC · JPL
840275	2014 YJ_{13}	—	October 4, 2002	Sacramento Peak	SDSS	·	2.5 km	MPC · JPL
840276	2014 YT_{20}	—	October 14, 2014	Mount Lemmon	Mount Lemmon Survey	·	2.5 km	MPC · JPL
840277	2014 YK_{21}	—	January 12, 2010	Mount Lemmon	Mount Lemmon Survey	·	4.8 km	MPC · JPL
840278	2014 YM_{22}	—	May 8, 2010	WISE	WISE	·	3.0 km	MPC · JPL
840279	2014 YS_{25}	—	December 15, 2014	Kitt Peak	Spacewatch	·	980 m	MPC · JPL
840280	2014 YM_{27}	—	November 17, 2007	Mount Lemmon	Mount Lemmon Survey	·	580 m	MPC · JPL
840281	2014 YM_{29}	—	May 27, 2010	WISE	WISE	·	2.6 km	MPC · JPL
840282	2014 YM_{30}	—	January 27, 2011	Mount Lemmon	Mount Lemmon Survey	·	1 km	MPC · JPL
840283	2014 YV_{33}	—	March 4, 2010	WISE	WISE	·	2.2 km	MPC · JPL
840284	2014 YQ_{35}	—	April 25, 2010	WISE	WISE	EUP	3.7 km	MPC · JPL
840285	2014 YL_{40}	—	April 10, 2010	WISE	WISE	EUP	3.8 km	MPC · JPL
840286	2014 YJ_{48}	—	May 21, 2013	Mount Lemmon	Mount Lemmon Survey	H	480 m	MPC · JPL
840287	2014 YM_{48}	—	February 4, 2005	Socorro	LINEAR	·	740 m	MPC · JPL
840288	2014 YL_{49}	—	October 27, 2009	Mount Lemmon	Mount Lemmon Survey	·	1.7 km	MPC · JPL
840289	2014 YR_{51}	—	November 20, 2011	Haleakala	Pan-STARRS 1	·	1.1 km	MPC · JPL
840290	2014 YU_{52}	—	December 21, 2014	Haleakala	Pan-STARRS 1	JUN	640 m	MPC · JPL
840291	2014 YE_{53}	—	December 29, 2014	Mount Lemmon	Mount Lemmon Survey	·	1.8 km	MPC · JPL
840292	2014 YR_{53}	—	January 17, 2010	WISE	WISE	·	2.2 km	MPC · JPL
840293	2014 YO_{56}	—	December 24, 2014	Mount Lemmon	Mount Lemmon Survey	·	1.1 km	MPC · JPL
840294	2014 YR_{60}	—	December 21, 2014	Haleakala	Pan-STARRS 1	EOS	1.4 km	MPC · JPL
840295	2014 YX_{60}	—	December 21, 2014	Haleakala	Pan-STARRS 1	·	910 m	MPC · JPL
840296	2014 YZ_{60}	—	January 30, 2004	Kitt Peak	Spacewatch	·	3.2 km	MPC · JPL
840297	2014 YS_{66}	—	April 6, 2010	Mount Lemmon	Mount Lemmon Survey	·	3.5 km	MPC · JPL
840298	2014 YO_{67}	—	May 27, 2010	WISE	WISE	·	2.8 km	MPC · JPL
840299	2014 YS_{69}	—	December 16, 2014	Haleakala	Pan-STARRS 1	H	420 m	MPC · JPL
840300	2014 YC_{71}	—	December 16, 2014	Haleakala	Pan-STARRS 1	PHO	690 m	MPC · JPL

== 840301–840400 ==
back to top

Designation			Discovery			Properties		Ref
Permanent	Provisional	Named after	Date	Site	Discoverer(s)	Category	Diam.	Ref
840301	2014 YN_{72}	—	November 20, 2008	Mount Lemmon	Mount Lemmon Survey	·	2.6 km	MPC · JPL
840302	2014 YF_{76}	—	December 29, 2014	Mount Lemmon	Mount Lemmon Survey	·	1.7 km	MPC · JPL
840303	2014 YW_{79}	—	December 29, 2014	Haleakala	Pan-STARRS 1	·	1.0 km	MPC · JPL
840304	2014 YJ_{82}	—	December 20, 2014	Calar Alto	S. Hellmich, S. Mottola	·	630 m	MPC · JPL
840305	2014 YD_{83}	—	December 21, 2014	Haleakala	Pan-STARRS 1	·	3.3 km	MPC · JPL
840306	2014 YT_{87}	—	December 29, 2014	Mount Lemmon	Mount Lemmon Survey	·	1.3 km	MPC · JPL
840307	2014 YM_{90}	—	December 21, 2014	Haleakala	Pan-STARRS 1	·	1.1 km	MPC · JPL
840308	2014 YQ_{93}	—	December 21, 2014	Haleakala	Pan-STARRS 1	·	610 m	MPC · JPL
840309	2014 YL_{95}	—	December 26, 2014	Haleakala	Pan-STARRS 1	·	880 m	MPC · JPL
840310	2014 YZ_{99}	—	December 29, 2014	Mount Lemmon	Mount Lemmon Survey	·	1.1 km	MPC · JPL
840311	2014 YS_{103}	—	December 29, 2014	Haleakala	Pan-STARRS 1	·	1.7 km	MPC · JPL
840312	2015 AO_{3}	—	January 7, 2003	Socorro	LINEAR	·	560 m	MPC · JPL
840313	2015 AR_{6}	—	September 6, 2008	Mount Lemmon	Mount Lemmon Survey	·	2.7 km	MPC · JPL
840314	2015 AZ_{7}	—	October 22, 2008	Mount Lemmon	Mount Lemmon Survey	·	2.4 km	MPC · JPL
840315	2015 AX_{8}	—	June 7, 2010	WISE	WISE	·	2.3 km	MPC · JPL
840316	2015 AM_{9}	—	November 18, 2014	Mount Lemmon	Mount Lemmon Survey	·	1.3 km	MPC · JPL
840317	2015 AV_{9}	—	January 11, 2015	Haleakala	Pan-STARRS 1	·	2.3 km	MPC · JPL
840318	2015 AD_{11}	—	October 5, 2002	Sacramento Peak	SDSS	·	2.1 km	MPC · JPL
840319	2015 AH_{11}	—	April 15, 2010	Mount Lemmon	Mount Lemmon Survey	·	3.0 km	MPC · JPL
840320	2015 AL_{12}	—	May 16, 2010	WISE	WISE	·	3.1 km	MPC · JPL
840321	2015 AZ_{13}	—	April 1, 2010	WISE	WISE	·	3.0 km	MPC · JPL
840322	2015 AR_{14}	—	August 29, 2009	Kitt Peak	Spacewatch	·	1.1 km	MPC · JPL
840323	2015 AS_{18}	—	November 22, 2014	Haleakala	Pan-STARRS 1	·	1.4 km	MPC · JPL
840324	2015 AN_{21}	—	April 24, 2010	WISE	WISE	·	3.7 km	MPC · JPL
840325	2015 AS_{23}	—	November 27, 2009	Mount Lemmon	Mount Lemmon Survey	·	2.5 km	MPC · JPL
840326	2015 AX_{24}	—	November 16, 2009	Kitt Peak	Spacewatch	·	1.7 km	MPC · JPL
840327	2015 AO_{25}	—	June 18, 2010	WISE	WISE	T_{j} (2.98)	2.5 km	MPC · JPL
840328	2015 AU_{26}	—	November 11, 2001	Sacramento Peak	SDSS	·	1.4 km	MPC · JPL
840329	2015 AG_{27}	—	March 21, 1999	Sacramento Peak	SDSS	·	860 m	MPC · JPL
840330	2015 AF_{29}	—	January 13, 2015	Haleakala	Pan-STARRS 1	·	1.5 km	MPC · JPL
840331	2015 AX_{29}	—	March 8, 2008	Kitt Peak	Spacewatch	·	920 m	MPC · JPL
840332	2015 AZ_{29}	—	February 9, 2010	Kitt Peak	Spacewatch	·	2.2 km	MPC · JPL
840333	2015 AJ_{31}	—	March 19, 2010	WISE	WISE	·	3.0 km	MPC · JPL
840334	2015 AM_{31}	—	December 21, 2014	Haleakala	Pan-STARRS 1	·	580 m	MPC · JPL
840335	2015 AQ_{36}	—	December 21, 2014	Mount Lemmon	Mount Lemmon Survey	·	390 m	MPC · JPL
840336	2015 AE_{39}	—	January 27, 2011	Mount Lemmon	Mount Lemmon Survey	(5)	870 m	MPC · JPL
840337	2015 AQ_{41}	—	January 13, 2015	Haleakala	Pan-STARRS 1	·	880 m	MPC · JPL
840338	2015 AA_{46}	—	November 4, 2014	Haleakala	Pan-STARRS 1	L5	7.0 km	MPC · JPL
840339	2015 AB_{49}	—	January 7, 2010	Kitt Peak	Spacewatch	H	390 m	MPC · JPL
840340	2015 AE_{50}	—	February 29, 2000	La Silla	Uppsala-DLR Asteroid Survey	3:2	4.1 km	MPC · JPL
840341	2015 AC_{52}	—	January 13, 2015	Haleakala	Pan-STARRS 1	·	500 m	MPC · JPL
840342	2015 AQ_{53}	—	February 1, 2012	Kitt Peak	Spacewatch	·	520 m	MPC · JPL
840343	2015 AZ_{57}	—	January 13, 2015	Haleakala	Pan-STARRS 1	·	2.4 km	MPC · JPL
840344	2015 AP_{65}	—	May 27, 2010	WISE	WISE	·	3.3 km	MPC · JPL
840345	2015 AK_{69}	—	December 29, 2014	Mount Lemmon	Mount Lemmon Survey	EOS	1.5 km	MPC · JPL
840346	2015 AD_{75}	—	December 18, 2009	Kitt Peak	Spacewatch	·	2.0 km	MPC · JPL
840347	2015 AG_{78}	—	June 7, 2010	WISE	WISE	·	3.6 km	MPC · JPL
840348	2015 AH_{79}	—	September 4, 2010	Kitt Peak	Spacewatch	·	430 m	MPC · JPL
840349	2015 AH_{85}	—	December 21, 2014	Mount Lemmon	Mount Lemmon Survey	·	760 m	MPC · JPL
840350	2015 AX_{85}	—	December 21, 2014	Haleakala	Pan-STARRS 1	·	2.1 km	MPC · JPL
840351	2015 AJ_{90}	—	May 6, 2006	Kitt Peak	Spacewatch	·	360 m	MPC · JPL
840352	2015 AK_{90}	—	January 13, 2015	Haleakala	Pan-STARRS 1	·	770 m	MPC · JPL
840353	2015 AV_{92}	—	March 4, 2010	Kitt Peak	Spacewatch	·	2.1 km	MPC · JPL
840354	2015 AJ_{93}	—	September 26, 2009	Kitt Peak	Spacewatch	·	930 m	MPC · JPL
840355	2015 AK_{93}	—	October 2, 2013	Kitt Peak	Spacewatch	·	1.4 km	MPC · JPL
840356	2015 AE_{96}	—	January 14, 2015	Haleakala	Pan-STARRS 1	·	2.3 km	MPC · JPL
840357	2015 AN_{97}	—	May 8, 2010	WISE	WISE	·	2.3 km	MPC · JPL
840358	2015 AF_{100}	—	September 14, 2013	Haleakala	Pan-STARRS 1	·	1.2 km	MPC · JPL
840359	2015 AW_{103}	—	January 14, 2015	Haleakala	Pan-STARRS 1	·	650 m	MPC · JPL
840360	2015 AH_{104}	—	January 14, 2015	Haleakala	Pan-STARRS 1	·	1.1 km	MPC · JPL
840361	2015 AP_{106}	—	January 14, 2015	Haleakala	Pan-STARRS 1	EOS	1.3 km	MPC · JPL
840362	2015 AG_{115}	—	April 28, 2008	Mount Lemmon	Mount Lemmon Survey	·	1.4 km	MPC · JPL
840363	2015 AK_{116}	—	January 14, 2015	Haleakala	Pan-STARRS 1	AGN	800 m	MPC · JPL
840364	2015 AW_{117}	—	February 25, 2011	Mount Lemmon	Mount Lemmon Survey	·	820 m	MPC · JPL
840365	2015 AL_{118}	—	March 4, 2005	Mount Lemmon	Mount Lemmon Survey	·	1.2 km	MPC · JPL
840366	2015 AM_{122}	—	May 27, 2010	WISE	WISE	·	2.4 km	MPC · JPL
840367	2015 AP_{122}	—	November 29, 2014	Haleakala	Pan-STARRS 1	·	800 m	MPC · JPL
840368	2015 AY_{123}	—	February 12, 2010	WISE	WISE	DOR	1.7 km	MPC · JPL
840369	2015 AH_{124}	—	January 14, 2015	Haleakala	Pan-STARRS 1	·	600 m	MPC · JPL
840370	2015 AS_{128}	—	February 5, 2011	Catalina	CSS	·	930 m	MPC · JPL
840371	2015 AK_{132}	—	January 14, 2015	Haleakala	Pan-STARRS 1	·	450 m	MPC · JPL
840372	2015 AG_{138}	—	May 9, 2010	WISE	WISE	·	3.0 km	MPC · JPL
840373	2015 AH_{141}	—	December 21, 2014	Haleakala	Pan-STARRS 1	·	710 m	MPC · JPL
840374	2015 AP_{144}	—	November 5, 2010	Mount Lemmon	Mount Lemmon Survey	·	870 m	MPC · JPL
840375	2015 AN_{149}	—	October 29, 2002	Sacramento Peak	SDSS	·	2.0 km	MPC · JPL
840376	2015 AW_{151}	—	January 14, 2015	Haleakala	Pan-STARRS 1	·	970 m	MPC · JPL
840377	2015 AE_{154}	—	June 28, 2010	WISE	WISE	·	2.4 km	MPC · JPL
840378	2015 AW_{154}	—	April 6, 2011	Catalina	CSS	·	1.3 km	MPC · JPL
840379	2015 AA_{155}	—	January 14, 2015	Haleakala	Pan-STARRS 1	·	880 m	MPC · JPL
840380	2015 AU_{155}	—	June 3, 2010	WISE	WISE	·	2.2 km	MPC · JPL
840381	2015 AM_{156}	—	December 21, 2014	Haleakala	Pan-STARRS 1	·	1.9 km	MPC · JPL
840382	2015 AO_{156}	—	December 21, 2014	Haleakala	Pan-STARRS 1	·	480 m	MPC · JPL
840383	2015 AO_{158}	—	January 14, 2015	Haleakala	Pan-STARRS 1	·	1.3 km	MPC · JPL
840384	2015 AH_{160}	—	January 14, 2015	Haleakala	Pan-STARRS 1	JUN	770 m	MPC · JPL
840385	2015 AX_{161}	—	October 5, 2002	Sacramento Peak	SDSS	·	2.5 km	MPC · JPL
840386	2015 AF_{165}	—	October 10, 2002	Sacramento Peak	SDSS	EOS	1.9 km	MPC · JPL
840387	2015 AH_{170}	—	January 14, 2015	Haleakala	Pan-STARRS 1	·	2.2 km	MPC · JPL
840388	2015 AF_{172}	—	December 21, 2014	Haleakala	Pan-STARRS 1	·	1.2 km	MPC · JPL
840389	2015 AA_{174}	—	January 14, 2015	Haleakala	Pan-STARRS 1	·	1.4 km	MPC · JPL
840390	2015 AO_{175}	—	January 14, 2015	Haleakala	Pan-STARRS 1	EOS	1.5 km	MPC · JPL
840391	2015 AV_{176}	—	September 14, 2007	Mount Lemmon	Mount Lemmon Survey	HYG	2.2 km	MPC · JPL
840392	2015 AR_{185}	—	September 28, 2009	Kitt Peak	Spacewatch	·	870 m	MPC · JPL
840393	2015 AO_{187}	—	August 21, 2006	Kitt Peak	Spacewatch	(2076)	520 m	MPC · JPL
840394	2015 AH_{192}	—	September 10, 2013	Haleakala	Pan-STARRS 1	·	1.3 km	MPC · JPL
840395	2015 AZ_{193}	—	February 27, 2012	Haleakala	Pan-STARRS 1	·	490 m	MPC · JPL
840396	2015 AY_{197}	—	January 14, 2015	Haleakala	Pan-STARRS 1	·	1.1 km	MPC · JPL
840397	2015 AD_{198}	—	May 13, 2010	WISE	WISE	·	3.5 km	MPC · JPL
840398	2015 AL_{199}	—	October 29, 2010	Kitt Peak	Spacewatch	·	870 m	MPC · JPL
840399	2015 AZ_{199}	—	January 14, 2015	Haleakala	Pan-STARRS 1	·	2.5 km	MPC · JPL
840400	2015 AY_{202}	—	January 14, 2015	Haleakala	Pan-STARRS 1	·	550 m	MPC · JPL

== 840401–840500 ==
back to top

Designation			Discovery			Properties		Ref
Permanent	Provisional	Named after	Date	Site	Discoverer(s)	Category	Diam.	Ref
840401	2015 AE_{204}	—	April 9, 2010	WISE	WISE	·	2.3 km	MPC · JPL
840402	2015 AT_{204}	—	June 17, 2010	WISE	WISE	·	2.7 km	MPC · JPL
840403	2015 AK_{205}	—	November 17, 2006	Kitt Peak	Spacewatch	·	910 m	MPC · JPL
840404	2015 AR_{206}	—	January 27, 2004	Kitt Peak	Spacewatch	·	2.6 km	MPC · JPL
840405	2015 AT_{207}	—	January 21, 2010	WISE	WISE	·	1.4 km	MPC · JPL
840406	2015 AU_{209}	—	October 10, 2007	Kitt Peak	Spacewatch	·	490 m	MPC · JPL
840407	2015 AB_{213}	—	November 20, 2014	Haleakala	Pan-STARRS 1	·	1.3 km	MPC · JPL
840408	2015 AX_{214}	—	December 16, 2014	Haleakala	Pan-STARRS 1	·	1.3 km	MPC · JPL
840409	2015 AZ_{219}	—	January 15, 2015	Haleakala	Pan-STARRS 1	H	490 m	MPC · JPL
840410	2015 AN_{229}	—	January 15, 2015	Haleakala	Pan-STARRS 1	·	920 m	MPC · JPL
840411	2015 AV_{232}	—	December 28, 2014	Mount Lemmon	Mount Lemmon Survey	H	420 m	MPC · JPL
840412	2015 AX_{232}	—	January 15, 2015	Haleakala	Pan-STARRS 1	EUN	760 m	MPC · JPL
840413	2015 AK_{234}	—	January 1, 2009	Kitt Peak	Spacewatch	(1118)	3.0 km	MPC · JPL
840414	2015 AN_{234}	—	July 28, 2011	Haleakala	Pan-STARRS 1	ULA	3.6 km	MPC · JPL
840415	2015 AZ_{234}	—	October 9, 2013	Mount Lemmon	Mount Lemmon Survey	·	2.0 km	MPC · JPL
840416	2015 AB_{235}	—	January 15, 2015	Haleakala	Pan-STARRS 1	·	2.4 km	MPC · JPL
840417	2015 AE_{238}	—	June 24, 2010	WISE	WISE	·	3.7 km	MPC · JPL
840418	2015 AG_{238}	—	February 27, 2012	Haleakala	Pan-STARRS 1	·	460 m	MPC · JPL
840419	2015 AT_{240}	—	October 5, 2002	Sacramento Peak	SDSS	·	2.5 km	MPC · JPL
840420	2015 AO_{241}	—	February 15, 2010	Kitt Peak	Spacewatch	·	2.1 km	MPC · JPL
840421	2015 AO_{243}	—	January 15, 2015	Haleakala	Pan-STARRS 1	MAR	800 m	MPC · JPL
840422	2015 AN_{245}	—	January 15, 2015	Haleakala	Pan-STARRS 1	·	970 m	MPC · JPL
840423	2015 AC_{247}	—	October 15, 2009	Mount Lemmon	Mount Lemmon Survey	·	1.2 km	MPC · JPL
840424	2015 AG_{248}	—	August 7, 2013	Kitt Peak	Spacewatch	·	2.7 km	MPC · JPL
840425	2015 AL_{249}	—	December 15, 2014	Mount Lemmon	Mount Lemmon Survey	·	1.2 km	MPC · JPL
840426	2015 AR_{249}	—	January 13, 2015	Haleakala	Pan-STARRS 1	·	1.1 km	MPC · JPL
840427	2015 AT_{249}	—	January 13, 2015	Haleakala	Pan-STARRS 1	KOR	930 m	MPC · JPL
840428	2015 AW_{251}	—	June 18, 2013	Haleakala	Pan-STARRS 1	·	920 m	MPC · JPL
840429	2015 AP_{253}	—	June 21, 2010	WISE	WISE	·	2.2 km	MPC · JPL
840430	2015 AU_{255}	—	April 6, 2010	WISE	WISE	·	2.1 km	MPC · JPL
840431	2015 AQ_{256}	—	December 21, 2014	Haleakala	Pan-STARRS 1	(5)	870 m	MPC · JPL
840432	2015 AM_{257}	—	December 21, 2014	Haleakala	Pan-STARRS 1	·	430 m	MPC · JPL
840433	2015 AA_{258}	—	January 15, 2015	Mount Lemmon	Mount Lemmon Survey	·	460 m	MPC · JPL
840434	2015 AR_{261}	—	January 15, 2015	Haleakala	Pan-STARRS 1	·	930 m	MPC · JPL
840435	2015 AH_{273}	—	March 30, 2008	Kitt Peak	Spacewatch	·	770 m	MPC · JPL
840436	2015 AZ_{275}	—	January 11, 2010	Kitt Peak	Spacewatch	·	1.1 km	MPC · JPL
840437	2015 AV_{279}	—	December 1, 2005	Kitt Peak	Spacewatch	·	1.5 km	MPC · JPL
840438	2015 AP_{281}	—	January 11, 2015	Haleakala	Pan-STARRS 1	H	300 m	MPC · JPL
840439	2015 AF_{282}	—	January 14, 2015	Haleakala	Pan-STARRS 1	H	390 m	MPC · JPL
840440	2015 AP_{285}	—	January 13, 2015	Haleakala	Pan-STARRS 1	·	1.9 km	MPC · JPL
840441	2015 AK_{288}	—	August 24, 2007	Kitt Peak	Spacewatch	·	2.6 km	MPC · JPL
840442	2015 AS_{289}	—	March 16, 2012	Mount Lemmon	Mount Lemmon Survey	·	570 m	MPC · JPL
840443	2015 AU_{290}	—	October 18, 2001	Kitt Peak	Spacewatch	·	1.1 km	MPC · JPL
840444	2015 AL_{294}	—	July 28, 2010	WISE	WISE	·	3.0 km	MPC · JPL
840445	2015 AU_{295}	—	January 13, 2015	Haleakala	Pan-STARRS 1	·	1.0 km	MPC · JPL
840446	2015 AM_{298}	—	January 14, 2015	Haleakala	Pan-STARRS 1	·	1.7 km	MPC · JPL
840447	2015 AT_{301}	—	January 15, 2015	Mount Lemmon	Mount Lemmon Survey	·	1.5 km	MPC · JPL
840448	2015 AY_{307}	—	January 14, 2015	Haleakala	Pan-STARRS 1	·	1.1 km	MPC · JPL
840449	2015 AN_{309}	—	January 15, 2015	Haleakala	Pan-STARRS 1	·	1.9 km	MPC · JPL
840450	2015 AU_{309}	—	January 13, 2015	Haleakala	Pan-STARRS 1	·	1.2 km	MPC · JPL
840451	2015 BJ_{2}	—	March 23, 2003	Sacramento Peak	SDSS	·	960 m	MPC · JPL
840452	2015 BT_{2}	—	January 16, 2015	Haleakala	Pan-STARRS 1	·	2.0 km	MPC · JPL
840453	2015 BO_{5}	—	December 16, 2014	Haleakala	Pan-STARRS 1	PHO	980 m	MPC · JPL
840454	2015 BU_{5}	—	January 20, 2009	Mount Lemmon	Mount Lemmon Survey	·	2.6 km	MPC · JPL
840455	2015 BA_{7}	—	January 16, 2015	Mount Lemmon	Mount Lemmon Survey	NYS	850 m	MPC · JPL
840456	2015 BW_{7}	—	March 15, 2010	WISE	WISE	·	2.1 km	MPC · JPL
840457	2015 BG_{8}	—	July 10, 2010	WISE	WISE	·	1.7 km	MPC · JPL
840458	2015 BZ_{10}	—	January 22, 2004	Mauna Kea	Allen, R. L.	·	1.2 km	MPC · JPL
840459	2015 BW_{12}	—	March 17, 2010	Mount Lemmon	Mount Lemmon Survey	·	2.6 km	MPC · JPL
840460	2015 BV_{13}	—	May 15, 2010	WISE	WISE	·	2.4 km	MPC · JPL
840461	2015 BW_{13}	—	June 13, 2010	WISE	WISE	·	2.8 km	MPC · JPL
840462	2015 BS_{15}	—	November 18, 2008	Catalina	CSS	·	2.6 km	MPC · JPL
840463	2015 BS_{20}	—	October 26, 2013	Mount Lemmon	Mount Lemmon Survey	·	2.2 km	MPC · JPL
840464	2015 BD_{24}	—	March 21, 1993	La Silla	UESAC	·	3.1 km	MPC · JPL
840465	2015 BR_{25}	—	January 16, 2015	Haleakala	Pan-STARRS 1	·	2.2 km	MPC · JPL
840466	2015 BD_{28}	—	November 29, 2014	Haleakala	Pan-STARRS 1	·	1.1 km	MPC · JPL
840467	2015 BC_{29}	—	January 16, 2015	Haleakala	Pan-STARRS 1	·	1.9 km	MPC · JPL
840468	2015 BK_{30}	—	January 13, 2010	WISE	WISE	LIX	2.9 km	MPC · JPL
840469	2015 BM_{32}	—	June 7, 2010	WISE	WISE	·	2.6 km	MPC · JPL
840470	2015 BA_{34}	—	January 16, 2015	Haleakala	Pan-STARRS 1	HYG	2.0 km	MPC · JPL
840471	2015 BD_{35}	—	March 20, 2010	WISE	WISE	·	1.7 km	MPC · JPL
840472	2015 BE_{38}	—	December 29, 2014	Haleakala	Pan-STARRS 1	·	1.0 km	MPC · JPL
840473	2015 BA_{39}	—	December 29, 2014	Haleakala	Pan-STARRS 1	·	1.3 km	MPC · JPL
840474	2015 BN_{45}	—	February 19, 2010	Mount Lemmon	Mount Lemmon Survey	·	2.1 km	MPC · JPL
840475	2015 BC_{47}	—	January 17, 2015	Haleakala	Pan-STARRS 1	·	610 m	MPC · JPL
840476	2015 BY_{48}	—	January 17, 2015	Haleakala	Pan-STARRS 1	·	2.0 km	MPC · JPL
840477	2015 BF_{56}	—	March 17, 2010	Mount Lemmon	Mount Lemmon Survey	·	2.7 km	MPC · JPL
840478	2015 BF_{59}	—	January 17, 2015	Haleakala	Pan-STARRS 1	·	800 m	MPC · JPL
840479	2015 BL_{59}	—	January 17, 2015	Haleakala	Pan-STARRS 1	·	1.0 km	MPC · JPL
840480	2015 BQ_{62}	—	March 20, 1999	Sacramento Peak	SDSS	·	3.1 km	MPC · JPL
840481	2015 BM_{63}	—	January 23, 2006	Kitt Peak	Spacewatch	·	1.6 km	MPC · JPL
840482	2015 BR_{65}	—	October 29, 2006	Mount Lemmon	Mount Lemmon Survey	NYS	840 m	MPC · JPL
840483	2015 BQ_{67}	—	April 1, 2003	Sacramento Peak	SDSS	·	1.2 km	MPC · JPL
840484	2015 BE_{68}	—	October 27, 2009	Mount Lemmon	Mount Lemmon Survey	·	2.2 km	MPC · JPL
840485	2015 BE_{69}	—	June 5, 2010	WISE	WISE	·	1.7 km	MPC · JPL
840486	2015 BF_{70}	—	August 28, 2013	Mount Lemmon	Mount Lemmon Survey	·	710 m	MPC · JPL
840487	2015 BH_{70}	—	December 21, 2008	Kitt Peak	Spacewatch	·	2.5 km	MPC · JPL
840488	2015 BD_{71}	—	July 1, 2010	WISE	WISE	LIX	3.2 km	MPC · JPL
840489	2015 BQ_{71}	—	January 17, 2015	Haleakala	Pan-STARRS 1	·	1.2 km	MPC · JPL
840490	2015 BM_{74}	—	February 16, 2010	Mount Lemmon	Mount Lemmon Survey	·	1.0 km	MPC · JPL
840491	2015 BP_{74}	—	June 25, 2010	WISE	WISE	·	1.8 km	MPC · JPL
840492	2015 BV_{75}	—	May 14, 2010	WISE	WISE	·	3.2 km	MPC · JPL
840493	2015 BW_{78}	—	January 17, 2015	Mount Lemmon	Mount Lemmon Survey	·	2.8 km	MPC · JPL
840494	2015 BL_{82}	—	May 23, 2010	WISE	WISE	·	2.9 km	MPC · JPL
840495	2015 BF_{83}	—	May 18, 2009	Mount Lemmon	Mount Lemmon Survey	·	670 m	MPC · JPL
840496	2015 BB_{85}	—	September 29, 1997	Mauna Kea	C. Veillet, R. Shanks	·	930 m	MPC · JPL
840497	2015 BQ_{91}	—	June 24, 2010	WISE	WISE	·	2.5 km	MPC · JPL
840498	2015 BC_{94}	—	December 20, 2014	ESA OGS	ESA OGS	·	1.2 km	MPC · JPL
840499	2015 BS_{100}	—	January 17, 2007	Kitt Peak	Spacewatch	·	750 m	MPC · JPL
840500	2015 BC_{104}	—	May 4, 2000	Sacramento Peak	SDSS	·	2.4 km	MPC · JPL

== 840501–840600 ==
back to top

Designation			Discovery			Properties		Ref
Permanent	Provisional	Named after	Date	Site	Discoverer(s)	Category	Diam.	Ref
840501	2015 BD_{104}	—	December 20, 2000	Kitt Peak	Deep Lens Survey	·	650 m	MPC · JPL
840502	2015 BB_{111}	—	November 6, 2005	Mount Lemmon	Mount Lemmon Survey	·	920 m	MPC · JPL
840503	2015 BS_{115}	—	June 11, 2010	WISE	WISE	EUP	2.3 km	MPC · JPL
840504	2015 BP_{118}	—	December 21, 2014	Haleakala	Pan-STARRS 1	·	930 m	MPC · JPL
840505	2015 BY_{118}	—	October 19, 2003	Sacramento Peak	SDSS	·	550 m	MPC · JPL
840506	2015 BZ_{119}	—	January 17, 2015	Haleakala	Pan-STARRS 1	·	470 m	MPC · JPL
840507	2015 BG_{123}	—	January 17, 2015	Haleakala	Pan-STARRS 1	·	890 m	MPC · JPL
840508	2015 BF_{125}	—	January 17, 2015	Haleakala	Pan-STARRS 1	·	970 m	MPC · JPL
840509	2015 BA_{126}	—	November 26, 2014	Haleakala	Pan-STARRS 1	·	2.3 km	MPC · JPL
840510	2015 BA_{131}	—	March 20, 1999	Sacramento Peak	SDSS	·	2.2 km	MPC · JPL
840511	2015 BF_{131}	—	January 17, 2015	Haleakala	Pan-STARRS 1	·	1.0 km	MPC · JPL
840512	2015 BE_{133}	—	January 17, 2015	Haleakala	Pan-STARRS 1	·	1.0 km	MPC · JPL
840513	2015 BA_{134}	—	January 17, 2015	Haleakala	Pan-STARRS 1	·	1.2 km	MPC · JPL
840514	2015 BE_{136}	—	January 17, 2015	Haleakala	Pan-STARRS 1	·	1.3 km	MPC · JPL
840515	2015 BC_{138}	—	January 17, 2015	Haleakala	Pan-STARRS 1	V	380 m	MPC · JPL
840516	2015 BU_{138}	—	March 20, 2010	Mount Lemmon	Mount Lemmon Survey	·	2.0 km	MPC · JPL
840517	2015 BF_{140}	—	January 17, 2015	Haleakala	Pan-STARRS 1	·	1.2 km	MPC · JPL
840518	2015 BH_{140}	—	June 3, 2010	WISE	WISE	·	3.5 km	MPC · JPL
840519	2015 BX_{142}	—	November 3, 2010	Mount Lemmon	Mount Lemmon Survey	·	580 m	MPC · JPL
840520	2015 BJ_{150}	—	November 6, 2010	Mount Lemmon	Mount Lemmon Survey	·	530 m	MPC · JPL
840521	2015 BG_{152}	—	August 27, 2006	Kitt Peak	Spacewatch	·	720 m	MPC · JPL
840522	2015 BN_{157}	—	November 1, 2013	Mount Lemmon	Mount Lemmon Survey	·	1.7 km	MPC · JPL
840523	2015 BX_{164}	—	January 14, 2011	Mount Lemmon	Mount Lemmon Survey	V	570 m	MPC · JPL
840524	2015 BR_{165}	—	September 26, 2006	Kitt Peak	Spacewatch	·	770 m	MPC · JPL
840525	2015 BZ_{167}	—	February 9, 2008	Kitt Peak	Spacewatch	V	410 m	MPC · JPL
840526	2015 BN_{169}	—	January 17, 2015	Haleakala	Pan-STARRS 1	MAS	490 m	MPC · JPL
840527	2015 BE_{174}	—	March 14, 2010	Kitt Peak	Spacewatch	·	1.3 km	MPC · JPL
840528	2015 BM_{175}	—	November 27, 2009	Mount Lemmon	Mount Lemmon Survey	DOR	1.9 km	MPC · JPL
840529	2015 BN_{177}	—	January 17, 2015	Haleakala	Pan-STARRS 1	·	2.9 km	MPC · JPL
840530	2015 BK_{178}	—	January 17, 2015	Haleakala	Pan-STARRS 1	(1547)	1.1 km	MPC · JPL
840531	2015 BQ_{180}	—	January 17, 2015	Haleakala	Pan-STARRS 1	·	1.8 km	MPC · JPL
840532	2015 BX_{181}	—	January 17, 2015	Haleakala	Pan-STARRS 1	HYG	2.0 km	MPC · JPL
840533	2015 BX_{185}	—	January 17, 2015	Haleakala	Pan-STARRS 1	·	550 m	MPC · JPL
840534	2015 BG_{186}	—	January 17, 2015	Haleakala	Pan-STARRS 1	·	1.7 km	MPC · JPL
840535	2015 BF_{189}	—	April 25, 2007	Mount Lemmon	Mount Lemmon Survey	·	960 m	MPC · JPL
840536	2015 BN_{189}	—	June 12, 2010	WISE	WISE	·	4.0 km	MPC · JPL
840537	2015 BG_{193}	—	November 27, 2013	Haleakala	Pan-STARRS 1	·	2.5 km	MPC · JPL
840538	2015 BT_{198}	—	January 17, 2015	Haleakala	Pan-STARRS 1	THM	1.9 km	MPC · JPL
840539	2015 BK_{204}	—	November 25, 2014	Haleakala	Pan-STARRS 1	·	2.6 km	MPC · JPL
840540	2015 BS_{207}	—	September 29, 2008	Mount Lemmon	Mount Lemmon Survey	LIX	3.0 km	MPC · JPL
840541	2015 BS_{213}	—	January 18, 2015	Kitt Peak	Spacewatch	NYS	890 m	MPC · JPL
840542	2015 BY_{213}	—	August 26, 2012	Haleakala	Pan-STARRS 1	·	2.3 km	MPC · JPL
840543	2015 BA_{215}	—	December 26, 2014	Haleakala	Pan-STARRS 1	·	1.4 km	MPC · JPL
840544	2015 BK_{215}	—	December 26, 2014	Haleakala	Pan-STARRS 1	·	390 m	MPC · JPL
840545	2015 BD_{217}	—	February 25, 2011	Mount Lemmon	Mount Lemmon Survey	·	1.2 km	MPC · JPL
840546	2015 BP_{219}	—	May 2, 2010	WISE	WISE	·	1.5 km	MPC · JPL
840547	2015 BQ_{220}	—	January 18, 2015	Haleakala	Pan-STARRS 1	·	1.2 km	MPC · JPL
840548	2015 BV_{220}	—	January 18, 2015	Haleakala	Pan-STARRS 1	EOS	1.4 km	MPC · JPL
840549	2015 BD_{222}	—	November 2, 2010	Mount Lemmon	Mount Lemmon Survey	·	740 m	MPC · JPL
840550	2015 BF_{222}	—	July 14, 2013	Haleakala	Pan-STARRS 1	·	980 m	MPC · JPL
840551	2015 BH_{223}	—	January 18, 2015	Haleakala	Pan-STARRS 1	·	920 m	MPC · JPL
840552	2015 BG_{225}	—	May 28, 2010	WISE	WISE	VER	2.0 km	MPC · JPL
840553	2015 BX_{227}	—	January 27, 2011	Mount Lemmon	Mount Lemmon Survey	·	1.0 km	MPC · JPL
840554	2015 BX_{228}	—	December 29, 2014	Haleakala	Pan-STARRS 1	EOS	1.4 km	MPC · JPL
840555	2015 BE_{232}	—	March 25, 2012	Kitt Peak	Spacewatch	·	520 m	MPC · JPL
840556	2015 BX_{232}	—	November 27, 2010	Mount Lemmon	Mount Lemmon Survey	·	810 m	MPC · JPL
840557	2015 BM_{235}	—	September 3, 2013	Mount Lemmon	Mount Lemmon Survey	GEF	920 m	MPC · JPL
840558	2015 BZ_{240}	—	August 12, 2013	Haleakala	Pan-STARRS 1	·	1.0 km	MPC · JPL
840559	2015 BN_{242}	—	May 15, 2012	Mount Lemmon	Mount Lemmon Survey	·	480 m	MPC · JPL
840560	2015 BE_{247}	—	March 13, 2010	Mount Lemmon	Mount Lemmon Survey	·	2.1 km	MPC · JPL
840561	2015 BC_{248}	—	March 15, 2004	Kitt Peak	Spacewatch	·	850 m	MPC · JPL
840562	2015 BD_{249}	—	February 10, 2002	Socorro	LINEAR	(1547)	1.2 km	MPC · JPL
840563	2015 BT_{249}	—	January 18, 2015	Haleakala	Pan-STARRS 1	·	950 m	MPC · JPL
840564	2015 BW_{254}	—	December 21, 2014	Mount Lemmon	Mount Lemmon Survey	·	1.1 km	MPC · JPL
840565	2015 BR_{259}	—	December 13, 2006	Mount Lemmon	Mount Lemmon Survey	·	880 m	MPC · JPL
840566	2015 BE_{263}	—	February 7, 2002	Kitt Peak	Spacewatch	·	1.1 km	MPC · JPL
840567	2015 BJ_{263}	—	February 3, 2008	Kitt Peak	Spacewatch	·	670 m	MPC · JPL
840568	2015 BW_{263}	—	January 18, 2015	Haleakala	Pan-STARRS 1	(194)	1.0 km	MPC · JPL
840569	2015 BY_{264}	—	December 29, 2014	Haleakala	Pan-STARRS 1	·	1.2 km	MPC · JPL
840570	2015 BZ_{267}	—	February 9, 2010	WISE	WISE	·	1.6 km	MPC · JPL
840571	2015 BL_{269}	—	May 10, 2010	WISE	WISE	·	3.0 km	MPC · JPL
840572	2015 BH_{271}	—	October 14, 2014	Mount Lemmon	Mount Lemmon Survey	·	2.5 km	MPC · JPL
840573	2015 BE_{273}	—	February 25, 2007	Mount Lemmon	Mount Lemmon Survey	·	790 m	MPC · JPL
840574	2015 BE_{274}	—	November 27, 2014	Haleakala	Pan-STARRS 1	·	1.9 km	MPC · JPL
840575	2015 BQ_{277}	—	April 5, 2010	WISE	WISE	·	2.5 km	MPC · JPL
840576	2015 BY_{277}	—	January 19, 2015	Mount Lemmon	Mount Lemmon Survey	·	1.2 km	MPC · JPL
840577	2015 BT_{280}	—	October 11, 2010	Mount Lemmon	Mount Lemmon Survey	·	780 m	MPC · JPL
840578	2015 BM_{281}	—	May 13, 2010	WISE	WISE	·	2.2 km	MPC · JPL
840579	2015 BT_{284}	—	October 5, 2002	Sacramento Peak	SDSS	EMA	2.5 km	MPC · JPL
840580	2015 BL_{288}	—	January 19, 2015	Haleakala	Pan-STARRS 1	·	2.2 km	MPC · JPL
840581	2015 BD_{291}	—	June 12, 2010	WISE	WISE	LUT	2.7 km	MPC · JPL
840582	2015 BK_{291}	—	February 17, 2010	Mount Lemmon	Mount Lemmon Survey	·	3.3 km	MPC · JPL
840583	2015 BD_{292}	—	October 5, 2002	Sacramento Peak	SDSS	MAS	510 m	MPC · JPL
840584	2015 BL_{292}	—	April 2, 2011	Mount Lemmon	Mount Lemmon Survey	·	940 m	MPC · JPL
840585	2015 BN_{293}	—	January 19, 2015	Haleakala	Pan-STARRS 1	EUN	710 m	MPC · JPL
840586	2015 BF_{296}	—	January 29, 2010	WISE	WISE	·	1.5 km	MPC · JPL
840587	2015 BR_{296}	—	September 27, 2008	Mount Lemmon	Mount Lemmon Survey	·	1.6 km	MPC · JPL
840588	2015 BH_{298}	—	January 19, 2015	Haleakala	Pan-STARRS 1	·	670 m	MPC · JPL
840589	2015 BZ_{299}	—	May 4, 2000	Sacramento Peak	SDSS	·	1.6 km	MPC · JPL
840590	2015 BF_{304}	—	January 19, 2015	Haleakala	Pan-STARRS 1	ERI	1.0 km	MPC · JPL
840591	2015 BB_{315}	—	June 17, 2010	WISE	WISE	·	2.3 km	MPC · JPL
840592	2015 BW_{316}	—	February 7, 2011	Mount Lemmon	Mount Lemmon Survey	·	750 m	MPC · JPL
840593	2015 BT_{319}	—	January 17, 2015	Haleakala	Pan-STARRS 1	·	1.0 km	MPC · JPL
840594	2015 BV_{320}	—	January 17, 2015	Haleakala	Pan-STARRS 1	·	790 m	MPC · JPL
840595	2015 BJ_{323}	—	October 1, 2000	Sacramento Peak	SDSS	·	550 m	MPC · JPL
840596	2015 BS_{325}	—	January 17, 2015	Haleakala	Pan-STARRS 1	·	2.3 km	MPC · JPL
840597	2015 BJ_{330}	—	January 17, 2015	Haleakala	Pan-STARRS 1	·	2.0 km	MPC · JPL
840598	2015 BR_{330}	—	October 28, 2013	Kitt Peak	Spacewatch	·	1.3 km	MPC · JPL
840599	2015 BO_{332}	—	December 21, 2014	Mount Lemmon	Mount Lemmon Survey	·	1.9 km	MPC · JPL
840600	2015 BH_{336}	—	October 13, 2013	Oukaïmeden	C. Rinner	·	2.1 km	MPC · JPL

== 840601–840700 ==
back to top

Designation			Discovery			Properties		Ref
Permanent	Provisional	Named after	Date	Site	Discoverer(s)	Category	Diam.	Ref
840601	2015 BQ_{337}	—	January 17, 2015	Haleakala	Pan-STARRS 1	EMA	2.0 km	MPC · JPL
840602	2015 BC_{338}	—	January 17, 2015	Haleakala	Pan-STARRS 1	·	1.2 km	MPC · JPL
840603	2015 BO_{338}	—	January 17, 2015	Haleakala	Pan-STARRS 1	·	780 m	MPC · JPL
840604	2015 BQ_{339}	—	January 17, 2015	Haleakala	Pan-STARRS 1	·	1.1 km	MPC · JPL
840605	2015 BL_{341}	—	January 17, 2015	Haleakala	Pan-STARRS 1	·	510 m	MPC · JPL
840606	2015 BV_{346}	—	February 11, 2004	Kitt Peak	Spacewatch	·	2.1 km	MPC · JPL
840607	2015 BE_{348}	—	January 30, 2011	Mount Lemmon	Mount Lemmon Survey	·	1 km	MPC · JPL
840608	2015 BT_{349}	—	May 1, 2012	Mount Lemmon	Mount Lemmon Survey	NYS	740 m	MPC · JPL
840609	2015 BJ_{353}	—	June 7, 2010	WISE	WISE	·	3.5 km	MPC · JPL
840610	2015 BL_{354}	—	February 2, 2008	Kitt Peak	Spacewatch	·	620 m	MPC · JPL
840611	2015 BV_{356}	—	February 25, 2011	Mount Lemmon	Mount Lemmon Survey	·	1.1 km	MPC · JPL
840612	2015 BA_{357}	—	September 28, 2008	Mount Lemmon	Mount Lemmon Survey	·	1.4 km	MPC · JPL
840613	2015 BU_{357}	—	October 5, 2002	Sacramento Peak	SDSS	·	1.7 km	MPC · JPL
840614	2015 BK_{363}	—	January 20, 2015	Haleakala	Pan-STARRS 1	·	540 m	MPC · JPL
840615	2015 BU_{369}	—	February 27, 2012	Haleakala	Pan-STARRS 1	·	510 m	MPC · JPL
840616	2015 BS_{373}	—	January 20, 2015	Haleakala	Pan-STARRS 1	EUN	750 m	MPC · JPL
840617	2015 BR_{387}	—	January 20, 2015	Haleakala	Pan-STARRS 1	·	650 m	MPC · JPL
840618	2015 BZ_{391}	—	March 25, 2012	Mount Lemmon	Mount Lemmon Survey	·	660 m	MPC · JPL
840619	2015 BN_{393}	—	February 7, 2010	WISE	WISE	·	3.5 km	MPC · JPL
840620	2015 BE_{400}	—	January 20, 2015	Haleakala	Pan-STARRS 1	·	1.3 km	MPC · JPL
840621	2015 BQ_{400}	—	April 29, 2008	Mount Lemmon	Mount Lemmon Survey	·	1.0 km	MPC · JPL
840622	2015 BZ_{401}	—	August 24, 2008	Kitt Peak	Spacewatch	·	1.4 km	MPC · JPL
840623	2015 BK_{403}	—	September 24, 2013	Mount Lemmon	Mount Lemmon Survey	·	950 m	MPC · JPL
840624	2015 BO_{412}	—	May 1, 2012	Mount Lemmon	Mount Lemmon Survey	·	570 m	MPC · JPL
840625	2015 BW_{412}	—	June 2, 2010	WISE	WISE	·	1.9 km	MPC · JPL
840626	2015 BA_{414}	—	January 20, 2015	Haleakala	Pan-STARRS 1	·	860 m	MPC · JPL
840627	2015 BA_{415}	—	September 26, 2000	Sacramento Peak	SDSS	·	1.7 km	MPC · JPL
840628	2015 BP_{416}	—	August 15, 2013	Haleakala	Pan-STARRS 1	·	640 m	MPC · JPL
840629	2015 BZ_{416}	—	January 20, 2015	Haleakala	Pan-STARRS 1	·	1.4 km	MPC · JPL
840630	2015 BL_{418}	—	January 29, 2010	WISE	WISE	·	2.7 km	MPC · JPL
840631	2015 BG_{419}	—	March 20, 1999	Sacramento Peak	SDSS	·	2.1 km	MPC · JPL
840632	2015 BO_{419}	—	January 20, 2015	Haleakala	Pan-STARRS 1	EUN	780 m	MPC · JPL
840633	2015 BN_{424}	—	January 20, 2015	Haleakala	Pan-STARRS 1	·	1.6 km	MPC · JPL
840634	2015 BD_{428}	—	July 14, 2013	Haleakala	Pan-STARRS 1	MAS	460 m	MPC · JPL
840635	2015 BH_{429}	—	December 20, 2004	Mount Lemmon	Mount Lemmon Survey	·	1.3 km	MPC · JPL
840636	2015 BD_{432}	—	January 20, 2015	Haleakala	Pan-STARRS 1	·	750 m	MPC · JPL
840637	2015 BL_{440}	—	January 20, 2015	Haleakala	Pan-STARRS 1	·	480 m	MPC · JPL
840638	2015 BM_{444}	—	January 20, 2015	Haleakala	Pan-STARRS 1	·	480 m	MPC · JPL
840639	2015 BX_{444}	—	September 19, 1998	Sacramento Peak	SDSS	·	870 m	MPC · JPL
840640	2015 BO_{450}	—	January 20, 2015	Haleakala	Pan-STARRS 1	·	450 m	MPC · JPL
840641	2015 BP_{452}	—	January 20, 2015	Haleakala	Pan-STARRS 1	·	1.1 km	MPC · JPL
840642	2015 BT_{453}	—	October 10, 2002	Sacramento Peak	SDSS	·	1.9 km	MPC · JPL
840643	2015 BQ_{455}	—	March 14, 2011	Mount Lemmon	Mount Lemmon Survey	·	920 m	MPC · JPL
840644	2015 BX_{463}	—	January 20, 2015	Haleakala	Pan-STARRS 1	HNS	920 m	MPC · JPL
840645	2015 BR_{464}	—	June 29, 2013	Haleakala	Pan-STARRS 1	H	350 m	MPC · JPL
840646	2015 BU_{464}	—	January 20, 2015	Haleakala	Pan-STARRS 1	MAR	610 m	MPC · JPL
840647	2015 BP_{467}	—	January 20, 2015	Kitt Peak	Spacewatch	·	1.4 km	MPC · JPL
840648	2015 BZ_{469}	—	January 20, 2015	Haleakala	Pan-STARRS 1	·	980 m	MPC · JPL
840649	2015 BS_{476}	—	January 20, 2015	Haleakala	Pan-STARRS 1	EUN	660 m	MPC · JPL
840650	2015 BC_{485}	—	January 20, 2015	Haleakala	Pan-STARRS 1	·	1.2 km	MPC · JPL
840651	2015 BD_{485}	—	March 20, 1999	Sacramento Peak	SDSS	VER	2.6 km	MPC · JPL
840652	2015 BQ_{491}	—	April 4, 2008	Kitt Peak	Spacewatch	MAS	540 m	MPC · JPL
840653	2015 BS_{494}	—	January 20, 2015	Haleakala	Pan-STARRS 1	·	1.0 km	MPC · JPL
840654	2015 BG_{495}	—	January 20, 2015	Haleakala	Pan-STARRS 1	·	1.3 km	MPC · JPL
840655	2015 BM_{495}	—	March 21, 1999	Sacramento Peak	SDSS	THM	1.9 km	MPC · JPL
840656	2015 BE_{502}	—	September 28, 2013	Mount Lemmon	Mount Lemmon Survey	·	670 m	MPC · JPL
840657	2015 BS_{504}	—	August 8, 2013	Haleakala	Pan-STARRS 1	·	1 km	MPC · JPL
840658	2015 BB_{506}	—	May 20, 2012	Haleakala	Pan-STARRS 1	·	650 m	MPC · JPL
840659	2015 BD_{510}	—	November 20, 2011	Haleakala	Pan-STARRS 1	H	490 m	MPC · JPL
840660	2015 BL_{513}	—	May 18, 2010	WISE	WISE	·	2.3 km	MPC · JPL
840661	2015 BT_{514}	—	December 26, 2014	Haleakala	Pan-STARRS 1	H	450 m	MPC · JPL
840662	2015 BN_{517}	—	October 11, 2007	Kitt Peak	Spacewatch	EOS	1.2 km	MPC · JPL
840663	2015 BT_{517}	—	June 13, 2005	Mount Lemmon	Mount Lemmon Survey	H	390 m	MPC · JPL
840664	2015 BS_{522}	—	January 16, 2015	Haleakala	Pan-STARRS 1	·	1.1 km	MPC · JPL
840665	2015 BE_{523}	—	October 31, 2013	Kitt Peak	Spacewatch	·	2.1 km	MPC · JPL
840666	2015 BG_{524}	—	December 31, 2008	Kitt Peak	Spacewatch	·	1.9 km	MPC · JPL
840667	2015 BJ_{524}	—	August 15, 2013	Haleakala	Pan-STARRS 1	V	300 m	MPC · JPL
840668	2015 BN_{524}	—	November 2, 2010	Mount Lemmon	Mount Lemmon Survey	·	680 m	MPC · JPL
840669	2015 BT_{525}	—	September 29, 2008	Kitt Peak	Spacewatch	·	1.5 km	MPC · JPL
840670	2015 BY_{525}	—	October 29, 2008	Kitt Peak	Spacewatch	·	1.8 km	MPC · JPL
840671	2015 BQ_{529}	—	May 29, 2010	WISE	WISE	·	3.2 km	MPC · JPL
840672	2015 BU_{531}	—	July 30, 2010	WISE	WISE	·	2.3 km	MPC · JPL
840673	2015 BR_{541}	—	October 5, 2002	Sacramento Peak	SDSS	·	1.6 km	MPC · JPL
840674	2015 BL_{544}	—	January 24, 2015	Mount Lemmon	Mount Lemmon Survey	·	1.4 km	MPC · JPL
840675	2015 BC_{545}	—	January 18, 2015	Mount Lemmon	Mount Lemmon Survey	·	1.9 km	MPC · JPL
840676	2015 BO_{550}	—	February 21, 2002	Kitt Peak	Spacewatch	EUN	890 m	MPC · JPL
840677	2015 BD_{552}	—	August 17, 2009	Kitt Peak	Spacewatch	·	1.6 km	MPC · JPL
840678	2015 BE_{554}	—	January 16, 2015	Haleakala	Pan-STARRS 1	·	530 m	MPC · JPL
840679	2015 BN_{555}	—	May 9, 2010	WISE	WISE	ARM	4.1 km	MPC · JPL
840680	2015 BQ_{555}	—	January 17, 2015	Mount Lemmon	Mount Lemmon Survey	·	1.9 km	MPC · JPL
840681	2015 BQ_{565}	—	January 20, 2015	Haleakala	Pan-STARRS 1	·	1.7 km	MPC · JPL
840682	2015 BR_{567}	—	April 9, 2008	Kitt Peak	Spacewatch	·	790 m	MPC · JPL
840683	2015 BJ_{569}	—	January 22, 2015	Haleakala	Pan-STARRS 1	HNS	890 m	MPC · JPL
840684	2015 BL_{571}	—	June 21, 2010	WISE	WISE	·	2.6 km	MPC · JPL
840685	2015 BD_{572}	—	January 19, 2015	Mount Lemmon	Mount Lemmon Survey	·	2.5 km	MPC · JPL
840686	2015 BE_{572}	—	April 13, 2010	Catalina	CSS	·	2.9 km	MPC · JPL
840687	2015 BZ_{572}	—	January 21, 2015	Haleakala	Pan-STARRS 1	·	1.3 km	MPC · JPL
840688	2015 BY_{573}	—	January 25, 2015	Haleakala	Pan-STARRS 1	·	2.0 km	MPC · JPL
840689	2015 BD_{574}	—	January 20, 2015	Mount Lemmon	Mount Lemmon Survey	H	350 m	MPC · JPL
840690	2015 BZ_{576}	—	March 19, 2018	Mount Lemmon	Mount Lemmon Survey	H	400 m	MPC · JPL
840691	2015 BX_{578}	—	January 28, 2015	Haleakala	Pan-STARRS 1	ADE	1.3 km	MPC · JPL
840692	2015 BQ_{579}	—	January 18, 2015	Haleakala	Pan-STARRS 1	JUN	700 m	MPC · JPL
840693	2015 BP_{580}	—	October 18, 2007	Mount Lemmon	Mount Lemmon Survey	·	2.7 km	MPC · JPL
840694	2015 BS_{581}	—	January 31, 2015	Haleakala	Pan-STARRS 1	GAL	1.2 km	MPC · JPL
840695	2015 BW_{582}	—	January 19, 2015	Haleakala	Pan-STARRS 1	T_{j} (2.98) · EUP	2.1 km	MPC · JPL
840696	2015 BN_{583}	—	January 19, 2015	Haleakala	Pan-STARRS 1	·	1 km	MPC · JPL
840697	2015 BZ_{583}	—	January 22, 2015	Haleakala	Pan-STARRS 1	·	1.2 km	MPC · JPL
840698	2015 BG_{584}	—	April 11, 2016	Haleakala	Pan-STARRS 1	MAR	850 m	MPC · JPL
840699	2015 BH_{586}	—	January 23, 2015	Haleakala	Pan-STARRS 1	·	1.3 km	MPC · JPL
840700	2015 BP_{586}	—	January 28, 2015	Haleakala	Pan-STARRS 1	·	2.2 km	MPC · JPL

== 840701–840800 ==
back to top

Designation			Discovery			Properties		Ref
Permanent	Provisional	Named after	Date	Site	Discoverer(s)	Category	Diam.	Ref
840701	2015 BG_{594}	—	January 21, 2015	Haleakala	Pan-STARRS 1	·	1.3 km	MPC · JPL
840702	2015 BS_{596}	—	January 25, 2015	Haleakala	Pan-STARRS 1	·	930 m	MPC · JPL
840703	2015 BQ_{598}	—	January 27, 2015	Haleakala	Pan-STARRS 1	EUN	810 m	MPC · JPL
840704	2015 BT_{598}	—	January 27, 2015	Haleakala	Pan-STARRS 1	·	1.1 km	MPC · JPL
840705	2015 BQ_{600}	—	January 22, 2015	Haleakala	Pan-STARRS 1	MIS	1.8 km	MPC · JPL
840706	2015 BY_{601}	—	January 17, 2015	Haleakala	Pan-STARRS 1	·	1.3 km	MPC · JPL
840707	2015 BN_{602}	—	January 26, 2015	Haleakala	Pan-STARRS 1	JUN	570 m	MPC · JPL
840708	2015 BR_{602}	—	January 20, 2015	Mount Lemmon	Mount Lemmon Survey	MAR	700 m	MPC · JPL
840709	2015 BP_{603}	—	January 23, 2015	Haleakala	Pan-STARRS 1	·	1.2 km	MPC · JPL
840710	2015 BV_{603}	—	January 19, 2015	Mount Lemmon	Mount Lemmon Survey	·	1.4 km	MPC · JPL
840711	2015 BJ_{609}	—	January 22, 2015	Haleakala	Pan-STARRS 1	·	2.0 km	MPC · JPL
840712	2015 BD_{610}	—	January 23, 2015	Haleakala	Pan-STARRS 1	·	550 m	MPC · JPL
840713	2015 BX_{612}	—	January 22, 2015	Haleakala	Pan-STARRS 1	JUN	800 m	MPC · JPL
840714	2015 BZ_{612}	—	January 23, 2015	Haleakala	Pan-STARRS 1	·	620 m	MPC · JPL
840715	2015 BP_{613}	—	January 28, 2015	Haleakala	Pan-STARRS 1	·	2.0 km	MPC · JPL
840716	2015 BQ_{613}	—	January 28, 2015	Haleakala	Pan-STARRS 1	H	390 m	MPC · JPL
840717	2015 BU_{614}	—	January 22, 2015	Haleakala	Pan-STARRS 1	MRX	690 m	MPC · JPL
840718	2015 BC_{616}	—	January 20, 2015	Haleakala	Pan-STARRS 1	HYG	1.8 km	MPC · JPL
840719	2015 BY_{617}	—	January 21, 2015	Haleakala	Pan-STARRS 1	·	750 m	MPC · JPL
840720	2015 BD_{618}	—	January 28, 2015	Haleakala	Pan-STARRS 1	·	630 m	MPC · JPL
840721	2015 BM_{618}	—	January 27, 2015	Haleakala	Pan-STARRS 1	MAR	750 m	MPC · JPL
840722	2015 CR_{8}	—	June 23, 2010	WISE	WISE	·	2.8 km	MPC · JPL
840723	2015 CO_{9}	—	October 15, 2007	Mount Lemmon	Mount Lemmon Survey	·	450 m	MPC · JPL
840724	2015 CR_{9}	—	January 22, 2015	Haleakala	Pan-STARRS 1	·	810 m	MPC · JPL
840725	2015 CS_{13}	—	October 28, 2014	Haleakala	Pan-STARRS 1	H	490 m	MPC · JPL
840726	2015 CQ_{14}	—	January 22, 2015	Haleakala	Pan-STARRS 1	·	1.1 km	MPC · JPL
840727	2015 CW_{24}	—	June 18, 2010	Kitt Peak	Spacewatch	EUP	2.7 km	MPC · JPL
840728	2015 CG_{26}	—	October 27, 2006	Mount Lemmon	Mount Lemmon Survey	·	790 m	MPC · JPL
840729	2015 CH_{26}	—	April 2, 2010	WISE	WISE	·	1.4 km	MPC · JPL
840730	2015 CZ_{27}	—	June 17, 2010	WISE	WISE	(1118)	2.9 km	MPC · JPL
840731	2015 CZ_{28}	—	June 25, 2010	WISE	WISE	·	2.7 km	MPC · JPL
840732	2015 CO_{29}	—	January 23, 2015	Haleakala	Pan-STARRS 1	EUN	750 m	MPC · JPL
840733	2015 CL_{30}	—	October 27, 2000	Bro	Uppsala-DLR Asteroid Survey	·	630 m	MPC · JPL
840734	2015 CV_{30}	—	April 16, 2005	Kitt Peak	Spacewatch	·	1.8 km	MPC · JPL
840735	2015 CM_{31}	—	January 17, 2015	Haleakala	Pan-STARRS 1	JUN	590 m	MPC · JPL
840736	2015 CE_{32}	—	June 15, 2010	WISE	WISE	T_{j} (2.98)	2.6 km	MPC · JPL
840737	2015 CB_{36}	—	September 6, 2008	Mount Lemmon	Mount Lemmon Survey	·	1.6 km	MPC · JPL
840738	2015 CL_{37}	—	December 26, 2014	Haleakala	Pan-STARRS 1	·	1.0 km	MPC · JPL
840739	2015 CK_{40}	—	September 26, 2000	Sacramento Peak	SDSS	·	3.3 km	MPC · JPL
840740	2015 CZ_{45}	—	March 4, 2010	WISE	WISE	BRU	2.7 km	MPC · JPL
840741	2015 CJ_{49}	—	June 17, 2010	WISE	WISE	·	2.6 km	MPC · JPL
840742	2015 CQ_{50}	—	February 15, 2015	Haleakala	Pan-STARRS 1	·	1.1 km	MPC · JPL
840743	2015 CA_{59}	—	January 18, 2010	WISE	WISE	·	3.3 km	MPC · JPL
840744	2015 CO_{69}	—	January 20, 2015	Mount Lemmon	Mount Lemmon Survey	TIR	2.0 km	MPC · JPL
840745	2015 CP_{69}	—	January 17, 2015	Haleakala	Pan-STARRS 1	·	1.6 km	MPC · JPL
840746	2015 CU_{70}	—	January 16, 2015	Haleakala	Pan-STARRS 1	·	860 m	MPC · JPL
840747	2015 CU_{71}	—	February 11, 2015	Mount Lemmon	Mount Lemmon Survey	ADE	1.4 km	MPC · JPL
840748	2015 CQ_{72}	—	February 8, 2015	Mount Lemmon	Mount Lemmon Survey	·	470 m	MPC · JPL
840749	2015 CY_{72}	—	February 9, 2015	Mount Lemmon	Mount Lemmon Survey	·	900 m	MPC · JPL
840750	2015 CQ_{73}	—	February 10, 2015	Kitt Peak	Spacewatch	·	1.3 km	MPC · JPL
840751	2015 CR_{73}	—	February 7, 2015	Mount Lemmon	Mount Lemmon Survey	EUN	850 m	MPC · JPL
840752	2015 CT_{74}	—	February 14, 2015	Mount Lemmon	Mount Lemmon Survey	·	650 m	MPC · JPL
840753	2015 CC_{75}	—	February 13, 2015	Mount Lemmon	Mount Lemmon Survey	·	2.2 km	MPC · JPL
840754	2015 CF_{76}	—	February 13, 2015	Haleakala	Pan-STARRS 1	·	2.0 km	MPC · JPL
840755	2015 CA_{79}	—	January 22, 2015	Haleakala	Pan-STARRS 1	ULA	3.3 km	MPC · JPL
840756	2015 CW_{79}	—	February 9, 2015	Mount Lemmon	Mount Lemmon Survey	EOS	1.6 km	MPC · JPL
840757	2015 CE_{81}	—	February 14, 2015	Mount Lemmon	Mount Lemmon Survey	·	1.6 km	MPC · JPL
840758	2015 CM_{81}	—	February 9, 2015	Mount Lemmon	Mount Lemmon Survey	·	1.3 km	MPC · JPL
840759	2015 DU_{1}	—	February 10, 2010	Kitt Peak	Spacewatch	·	3.2 km	MPC · JPL
840760	2015 DE_{2}	—	January 8, 2010	Mount Lemmon	Mount Lemmon Survey	·	2.9 km	MPC · JPL
840761	2015 DE_{3}	—	January 19, 2015	Mount Lemmon	Mount Lemmon Survey	HNS	860 m	MPC · JPL
840762	2015 DJ_{5}	—	January 16, 2015	Haleakala	Pan-STARRS 1	·	3.2 km	MPC · JPL
840763	2015 DT_{7}	—	May 15, 2010	WISE	WISE	·	2.2 km	MPC · JPL
840764	2015 DV_{10}	—	January 7, 2009	Kitt Peak	Spacewatch	·	2.1 km	MPC · JPL
840765	2015 DY_{12}	—	January 20, 2015	Haleakala	Pan-STARRS 1	V	520 m	MPC · JPL
840766	2015 DD_{14}	—	March 30, 2012	Mount Lemmon	Mount Lemmon Survey	·	390 m	MPC · JPL
840767	2015 DW_{15}	—	July 14, 2013	Haleakala	Pan-STARRS 1	·	850 m	MPC · JPL
840768	2015 DE_{17}	—	January 29, 2015	Haleakala	Pan-STARRS 1	·	630 m	MPC · JPL
840769	2015 DL_{17}	—	July 22, 2010	WISE	WISE	·	2.5 km	MPC · JPL
840770	2015 DH_{27}	—	March 20, 2010	Zelenchukskaya	T. V. Krjačko, B. Satovski	·	1.5 km	MPC · JPL
840771	2015 DN_{34}	—	February 16, 2015	Haleakala	Pan-STARRS 1	·	920 m	MPC · JPL
840772	2015 DU_{35}	—	January 26, 2011	Mount Lemmon	Mount Lemmon Survey	NYS	790 m	MPC · JPL
840773	2015 DL_{38}	—	February 6, 2010	Mount Lemmon	Mount Lemmon Survey	DOR	1.9 km	MPC · JPL
840774	2015 DG_{40}	—	March 15, 2010	WISE	WISE	·	1.4 km	MPC · JPL
840775	2015 DQ_{40}	—	January 27, 2015	Haleakala	Pan-STARRS 1	·	540 m	MPC · JPL
840776	2015 DG_{42}	—	April 23, 2012	Kitt Peak	Spacewatch	·	500 m	MPC · JPL
840777	2015 DK_{46}	—	February 10, 2010	Kitt Peak	Spacewatch	·	1.3 km	MPC · JPL
840778	2015 DO_{46}	—	January 21, 2015	Haleakala	Pan-STARRS 1	·	900 m	MPC · JPL
840779	2015 DU_{46}	—	March 17, 2010	WISE	WISE	·	1.3 km	MPC · JPL
840780	2015 DV_{46}	—	February 16, 2015	Haleakala	Pan-STARRS 1	·	1.3 km	MPC · JPL
840781	2015 DT_{48}	—	February 16, 2015	Haleakala	Pan-STARRS 1	·	660 m	MPC · JPL
840782	2015 DD_{49}	—	January 27, 2015	Haleakala	Pan-STARRS 1	EOS	1.5 km	MPC · JPL
840783	2015 DJ_{49}	—	November 27, 2013	Haleakala	Pan-STARRS 1	·	1.3 km	MPC · JPL
840784	2015 DS_{62}	—	November 14, 2013	Mount Lemmon	Mount Lemmon Survey	·	2.1 km	MPC · JPL
840785	2015 DZ_{65}	—	October 26, 2013	Kitt Peak	Spacewatch	KOR	960 m	MPC · JPL
840786	2015 DV_{71}	—	October 14, 2010	Mount Lemmon	Mount Lemmon Survey	·	610 m	MPC · JPL
840787	2015 DK_{78}	—	February 26, 2011	Mount Lemmon	Mount Lemmon Survey	·	820 m	MPC · JPL
840788	2015 DQ_{84}	—	December 3, 2010	Mount Lemmon	Mount Lemmon Survey	MAS	440 m	MPC · JPL
840789	2015 DX_{87}	—	June 10, 2010	WISE	WISE	·	2.2 km	MPC · JPL
840790	2015 DG_{89}	—	October 4, 2013	Mount Lemmon	Mount Lemmon Survey	·	1 km	MPC · JPL
840791	2015 DO_{89}	—	January 20, 2015	Haleakala	Pan-STARRS 1	·	920 m	MPC · JPL
840792	2015 DP_{89}	—	November 2, 2013	Westfield	International Astronomical Search Collaboration	·	2.5 km	MPC · JPL
840793	2015 DG_{93}	—	March 21, 1999	Sacramento Peak	SDSS	·	900 m	MPC · JPL
840794	2015 DA_{95}	—	February 16, 2015	Haleakala	Pan-STARRS 1	·	1.1 km	MPC · JPL
840795	2015 DX_{95}	—	April 6, 2010	Mount Lemmon	Mount Lemmon Survey	·	1.4 km	MPC · JPL
840796	2015 DX_{96}	—	March 10, 2011	Kitt Peak	Spacewatch	·	840 m	MPC · JPL
840797	2015 DA_{97}	—	September 26, 2000	Sacramento Peak	SDSS	EUN	930 m	MPC · JPL
840798	2015 DJ_{97}	—	March 20, 1999	Sacramento Peak	SDSS	·	950 m	MPC · JPL
840799	2015 DD_{104}	—	October 9, 2013	Mount Lemmon	Mount Lemmon Survey	EOS	1.4 km	MPC · JPL
840800	2015 DG_{114}	—	May 30, 2010	WISE	WISE	·	2.8 km	MPC · JPL

== 840801–840900 ==
back to top

Designation			Discovery			Properties		Ref
Permanent	Provisional	Named after	Date	Site	Discoverer(s)	Category	Diam.	Ref
840801	2015 DE_{117}	—	May 29, 2010	WISE	WISE	·	4.1 km	MPC · JPL
840802	2015 DA_{124}	—	January 28, 2015	Haleakala	Pan-STARRS 1	·	2.2 km	MPC · JPL
840803	2015 DX_{124}	—	November 27, 2009	Mount Lemmon	Mount Lemmon Survey	·	2.0 km	MPC · JPL
840804	2015 DE_{129}	—	November 27, 2009	Mount Lemmon	Mount Lemmon Survey	·	1.5 km	MPC · JPL
840805	2015 DX_{129}	—	June 2, 2010	WISE	WISE	·	2.5 km	MPC · JPL
840806	2015 DE_{131}	—	November 21, 2008	Kitt Peak	Spacewatch	·	2.6 km	MPC · JPL
840807	2015 DV_{131}	—	February 19, 2010	Mount Lemmon	Mount Lemmon Survey	·	1.3 km	MPC · JPL
840808	2015 DQ_{135}	—	February 17, 2015	Haleakala	Pan-STARRS 1	H	420 m	MPC · JPL
840809	2015 DS_{135}	—	November 29, 2013	Mount Lemmon	Mount Lemmon Survey	·	2.0 km	MPC · JPL
840810	2015 DM_{136}	—	February 17, 2015	Haleakala	Pan-STARRS 1	EUN	950 m	MPC · JPL
840811	2015 DU_{136}	—	May 27, 2011	Kitt Peak	Spacewatch	·	1.4 km	MPC · JPL
840812	2015 DA_{137}	—	May 16, 2010	WISE	WISE	·	2.8 km	MPC · JPL
840813	2015 DZ_{143}	—	June 28, 2010	WISE	WISE	·	3.9 km	MPC · JPL
840814	2015 DE_{144}	—	January 18, 2015	Mount Lemmon	Mount Lemmon Survey	·	1.1 km	MPC · JPL
840815	2015 DC_{148}	—	February 15, 2010	Kitt Peak	Spacewatch	·	2.1 km	MPC · JPL
840816	2015 DA_{149}	—	January 15, 2015	Haleakala	Pan-STARRS 1	·	2.0 km	MPC · JPL
840817	2015 DO_{149}	—	January 8, 2010	WISE	WISE	·	2.6 km	MPC · JPL
840818	2015 DX_{150}	—	May 18, 2010	WISE	WISE	·	2.1 km	MPC · JPL
840819	2015 DU_{154}	—	March 27, 2008	Mount Lemmon	Mount Lemmon Survey	·	680 m	MPC · JPL
840820	2015 DR_{156}	—	January 18, 2009	Kitt Peak	Spacewatch	·	2.7 km	MPC · JPL
840821	2015 DZ_{157}	—	April 16, 2010	WISE	WISE	·	2.2 km	MPC · JPL
840822	2015 DC_{163}	—	April 14, 2010	Mount Lemmon	Mount Lemmon Survey	EMA	2.4 km	MPC · JPL
840823	2015 DT_{165}	—	March 20, 2010	Kitt Peak	Spacewatch	·	1.7 km	MPC · JPL
840824	2015 DS_{178}	—	February 20, 2015	Haleakala	Pan-STARRS 1	EUN	1.0 km	MPC · JPL
840825	2015 DX_{179}	—	January 18, 2015	Haleakala	Pan-STARRS 1	·	1.5 km	MPC · JPL
840826	2015 DE_{182}	—	March 16, 2004	Kitt Peak	Spacewatch	THB	2.8 km	MPC · JPL
840827	2015 DB_{185}	—	December 19, 2009	Mount Lemmon	Mount Lemmon Survey	DOR	1.9 km	MPC · JPL
840828	2015 DH_{187}	—	February 20, 2015	Haleakala	Pan-STARRS 1	·	1.1 km	MPC · JPL
840829	2015 DV_{193}	—	June 16, 2010	WISE	WISE	·	4.6 km	MPC · JPL
840830	2015 DO_{194}	—	March 19, 2010	Mount Lemmon	Mount Lemmon Survey	·	2.1 km	MPC · JPL
840831	2015 DJ_{196}	—	February 22, 2015	Haleakala	Pan-STARRS 1	·	860 m	MPC · JPL
840832	2015 DJ_{204}	—	April 9, 2010	Catalina	CSS	·	2.9 km	MPC · JPL
840833	2015 DY_{204}	—	February 23, 2015	Haleakala	Pan-STARRS 1	(2076)	600 m	MPC · JPL
840834	2015 DM_{206}	—	May 23, 2011	Mount Lemmon	Mount Lemmon Survey	·	860 m	MPC · JPL
840835	2015 DE_{211}	—	March 26, 2001	Kitt Peak	Spacewatch	·	670 m	MPC · JPL
840836	2015 DP_{212}	—	January 28, 2015	Haleakala	Pan-STARRS 1	·	1.9 km	MPC · JPL
840837	2015 DR_{216}	—	October 13, 1999	Sacramento Peak	SDSS	·	1.9 km	MPC · JPL
840838	2015 DJ_{217}	—	September 19, 1998	Sacramento Peak	SDSS	·	1.9 km	MPC · JPL
840839	2015 DT_{220}	—	January 20, 2015	Haleakala	Pan-STARRS 1	CLO	1.8 km	MPC · JPL
840840	2015 DJ_{224}	—	January 22, 2015	Mount Lemmon	Mount Lemmon Survey	BRG	1.3 km	MPC · JPL
840841	2015 DN_{225}	—	February 18, 2015	Haleakala	Pan-STARRS 1	H	440 m	MPC · JPL
840842	2015 DC_{228}	—	February 24, 2015	Haleakala	Pan-STARRS 1	·	1.6 km	MPC · JPL
840843	2015 DZ_{229}	—	January 23, 2015	Haleakala	Pan-STARRS 1	·	1.0 km	MPC · JPL
840844	2015 DD_{231}	—	February 16, 2015	Haleakala	Pan-STARRS 1	·	1.8 km	MPC · JPL
840845	2015 DN_{231}	—	March 4, 2010	WISE	WISE	·	2.3 km	MPC · JPL
840846	2015 DE_{241}	—	January 21, 2015	Haleakala	Pan-STARRS 1	PHO	850 m	MPC · JPL
840847	2015 DO_{242}	—	April 2, 2010	WISE	WISE	T_{j} (2.99)	2.6 km	MPC · JPL
840848	2015 DL_{250}	—	January 28, 2011	Mount Lemmon	Mount Lemmon Survey	NYS	760 m	MPC · JPL
840849	2015 DC_{252}	—	February 27, 2015	Haleakala	Pan-STARRS 1	T_{j} (2.98)	2.9 km	MPC · JPL
840850	2015 DJ_{252}	—	February 16, 2015	Haleakala	Pan-STARRS 1	·	560 m	MPC · JPL
840851	2015 DQ_{252}	—	August 17, 2006	Palomar	NEAT	·	2.1 km	MPC · JPL
840852	2015 DV_{252}	—	February 16, 2015	Haleakala	Pan-STARRS 1	·	1.1 km	MPC · JPL
840853	2015 DL_{253}	—	February 18, 2015	Haleakala	Pan-STARRS 1	·	2.3 km	MPC · JPL
840854	2015 DJ_{254}	—	January 26, 2010	WISE	WISE	·	1.8 km	MPC · JPL
840855	2015 DV_{254}	—	February 16, 2015	Haleakala	Pan-STARRS 1	·	2.4 km	MPC · JPL
840856	2015 DU_{255}	—	February 23, 2015	Haleakala	Pan-STARRS 1	·	530 m	MPC · JPL
840857	2015 DE_{257}	—	October 10, 2002	Sacramento Peak	SDSS	·	1.9 km	MPC · JPL
840858	2015 DP_{258}	—	January 7, 2014	Mount Lemmon	Mount Lemmon Survey	·	2.3 km	MPC · JPL
840859	2015 DW_{258}	—	September 23, 2017	Haleakala	Pan-STARRS 1	·	850 m	MPC · JPL
840860	2015 DO_{259}	—	August 3, 2016	Haleakala	Pan-STARRS 1	V	530 m	MPC · JPL
840861	2015 DR_{260}	—	May 18, 2010	WISE	WISE	·	2.2 km	MPC · JPL
840862	2015 DS_{262}	—	February 24, 2015	Haleakala	Pan-STARRS 1	·	590 m	MPC · JPL
840863	2015 DV_{262}	—	February 16, 2015	Haleakala	Pan-STARRS 1	·	1.1 km	MPC · JPL
840864	2015 DB_{264}	—	February 16, 2015	Haleakala	Pan-STARRS 1	·	650 m	MPC · JPL
840865	2015 DE_{266}	—	February 19, 2015	Haleakala	Pan-STARRS 1	·	2.2 km	MPC · JPL
840866	2015 DV_{266}	—	February 20, 2015	Haleakala	Pan-STARRS 1	MAR	780 m	MPC · JPL
840867	2015 DC_{268}	—	February 18, 2015	Haleakala	Pan-STARRS 1	·	2.1 km	MPC · JPL
840868	2015 DD_{271}	—	February 24, 2015	Haleakala	Pan-STARRS 1	·	1.0 km	MPC · JPL
840869	2015 DF_{271}	—	February 18, 2015	Haleakala	Pan-STARRS 1	AEO	790 m	MPC · JPL
840870	2015 DH_{272}	—	February 19, 2015	Mount Lemmon	Mount Lemmon Survey	·	960 m	MPC · JPL
840871	2015 DL_{272}	—	February 17, 2015	Haleakala	Pan-STARRS 1	·	920 m	MPC · JPL
840872	2015 DV_{273}	—	February 16, 2015	Haleakala	Pan-STARRS 1	·	470 m	MPC · JPL
840873	2015 DF_{274}	—	February 18, 2015	Haleakala	Pan-STARRS 1	H	390 m	MPC · JPL
840874	2015 DK_{274}	—	February 16, 2015	Haleakala	Pan-STARRS 1	·	1.1 km	MPC · JPL
840875	2015 DM_{275}	—	February 23, 2015	Haleakala	Pan-STARRS 1	·	990 m	MPC · JPL
840876	2015 DW_{276}	—	February 18, 2015	Haleakala	Pan-STARRS 1	·	1.4 km	MPC · JPL
840877	2015 DR_{282}	—	February 20, 2015	Haleakala	Pan-STARRS 1	·	1.9 km	MPC · JPL
840878	2015 DJ_{292}	—	February 24, 2015	Haleakala	Pan-STARRS 1	·	1.0 km	MPC · JPL
840879	2015 DC_{295}	—	February 16, 2015	Haleakala	Pan-STARRS 1	·	1.4 km	MPC · JPL
840880	2015 DY_{295}	—	February 18, 2015	Mount Lemmon	Mount Lemmon Survey	·	1.5 km	MPC · JPL
840881	2015 DE_{299}	—	February 16, 2015	Haleakala	Pan-STARRS 1	·	1.5 km	MPC · JPL
840882	2015 DS_{300}	—	February 18, 2015	Haleakala	Pan-STARRS 1	·	2.4 km	MPC · JPL
840883	2015 DA_{305}	—	February 18, 2015	Haleakala	Pan-STARRS 1	·	1.3 km	MPC · JPL
840884	2015 DC_{305}	—	February 16, 2015	Haleakala	Pan-STARRS 1	·	1.2 km	MPC · JPL
840885	2015 DF_{307}	—	February 20, 2015	Haleakala	Pan-STARRS 1	·	2.2 km	MPC · JPL
840886	2015 DC_{316}	—	February 27, 2015	Haleakala	Pan-STARRS 1	·	1.1 km	MPC · JPL
840887	2015 DL_{316}	—	February 19, 2015	Haleakala	Pan-STARRS 1	·	2.2 km	MPC · JPL
840888	2015 DC_{321}	—	February 24, 2015	Haleakala	Pan-STARRS 1	·	1.1 km	MPC · JPL
840889	2015 ED_{2}	—	January 21, 2015	Haleakala	Pan-STARRS 1	·	1.2 km	MPC · JPL
840890	2015 EQ_{2}	—	January 21, 2015	Haleakala	Pan-STARRS 1	·	710 m	MPC · JPL
840891	2015 ER_{2}	—	February 16, 2015	Haleakala	Pan-STARRS 1	·	1.2 km	MPC · JPL
840892	2015 EX_{2}	—	March 2, 2006	Kitt Peak	Spacewatch	·	1.4 km	MPC · JPL
840893	2015 EV_{5}	—	March 21, 1999	Sacramento Peak	SDSS	·	1.8 km	MPC · JPL
840894	2015 EG_{8}	—	November 1, 2013	Mount Lemmon	Mount Lemmon Survey	PHO	730 m	MPC · JPL
840895	2015 ER_{14}	—	August 9, 2013	Haleakala	Pan-STARRS 1	·	830 m	MPC · JPL
840896	2015 EE_{19}	—	March 21, 2010	Mount Lemmon	Mount Lemmon Survey	·	2.8 km	MPC · JPL
840897	2015 EH_{19}	—	January 14, 2010	WISE	WISE	·	3.2 km	MPC · JPL
840898	2015 EV_{25}	—	March 10, 2011	Kitt Peak	Spacewatch	·	930 m	MPC · JPL
840899	2015 ED_{27}	—	November 11, 2010	Mount Lemmon	Mount Lemmon Survey	·	600 m	MPC · JPL
840900	2015 EN_{28}	—	March 14, 2015	Haleakala	Pan-STARRS 1	·	430 m	MPC · JPL

== 840901–841000 ==
back to top

Designation			Discovery			Properties		Ref
Permanent	Provisional	Named after	Date	Site	Discoverer(s)	Category	Diam.	Ref
840901	2015 EF_{29}	—	January 19, 2015	Mount Lemmon	Mount Lemmon Survey	·	2.3 km	MPC · JPL
840902	2015 EJ_{30}	—	December 15, 2009	Catalina	CSS	·	1.8 km	MPC · JPL
840903	2015 EK_{34}	—	February 10, 2015	Kitt Peak	Spacewatch	·	880 m	MPC · JPL
840904	2015 EH_{39}	—	January 21, 2015	Haleakala	Pan-STARRS 1	·	2.4 km	MPC · JPL
840905	2015 EW_{40}	—	February 24, 2006	Kitt Peak	Spacewatch	·	990 m	MPC · JPL
840906	2015 EB_{44}	—	December 26, 2009	Kitt Peak	Spacewatch	DOR	2.0 km	MPC · JPL
840907	2015 EM_{44}	—	January 15, 2015	Haleakala	Pan-STARRS 1	·	1.5 km	MPC · JPL
840908	2015 EH_{45}	—	February 16, 2015	Haleakala	Pan-STARRS 1	·	700 m	MPC · JPL
840909	2015 EU_{45}	—	March 21, 1999	Sacramento Peak	SDSS	·	2.1 km	MPC · JPL
840910	2015 EB_{52}	—	February 20, 2015	Haleakala	Pan-STARRS 1	·	2.3 km	MPC · JPL
840911	2015 EC_{53}	—	February 20, 2015	Haleakala	Pan-STARRS 1	·	1.1 km	MPC · JPL
840912	2015 EN_{53}	—	January 16, 2015	Haleakala	Pan-STARRS 1	·	1.2 km	MPC · JPL
840913	2015 EO_{53}	—	March 4, 2006	Mount Lemmon	Mount Lemmon Survey	JUN	960 m	MPC · JPL
840914	2015 EQ_{54}	—	February 28, 2010	WISE	WISE	·	1.3 km	MPC · JPL
840915	2015 EP_{55}	—	February 10, 2015	Mount Lemmon	Mount Lemmon Survey	·	970 m	MPC · JPL
840916	2015 EH_{59}	—	October 5, 2002	Sacramento Peak	SDSS	V	530 m	MPC · JPL
840917	2015 EL_{59}	—	December 8, 2010	Mount Lemmon	Mount Lemmon Survey	·	930 m	MPC · JPL
840918	2015 EP_{60}	—	March 15, 2015	Kitt Peak	Spacewatch	·	1.4 km	MPC · JPL
840919	2015 EN_{69}	—	April 10, 2000	Kitt Peak	M. W. Buie	·	1.3 km	MPC · JPL
840920	2015 EL_{70}	—	February 16, 2010	Mount Lemmon	Mount Lemmon Survey	·	1.6 km	MPC · JPL
840921	2015 EW_{70}	—	February 27, 2006	Kitt Peak	Spacewatch	·	1.1 km	MPC · JPL
840922	2015 EA_{75}	—	March 1, 2015	Haleakala	Pan-STARRS 1	·	1.2 km	MPC · JPL
840923	2015 EB_{76}	—	June 17, 2010	Kitt Peak	Spacewatch	EUP	2.2 km	MPC · JPL
840924	2015 EG_{77}	—	March 11, 2015	Mount Lemmon	Mount Lemmon Survey	·	1.1 km	MPC · JPL
840925	2015 ET_{79}	—	March 10, 2015	Mount Lemmon	Mount Lemmon Survey	·	1.3 km	MPC · JPL
840926	2015 EA_{81}	—	March 11, 2015	Mount Lemmon	Mount Lemmon Survey	·	2.1 km	MPC · JPL
840927	2015 ET_{81}	—	March 15, 2015	Haleakala	Pan-STARRS 1	·	1.2 km	MPC · JPL
840928	2015 FW_{2}	—	March 16, 2015	Haleakala	Pan-STARRS 1	H	380 m	MPC · JPL
840929	2015 FN_{3}	—	March 29, 2011	Mount Lemmon	Mount Lemmon Survey	·	1.3 km	MPC · JPL
840930	2015 FY_{6}	—	January 15, 2015	Haleakala	Pan-STARRS 1	·	1.1 km	MPC · JPL
840931	2015 FG_{8}	—	June 12, 2010	WISE	WISE	·	2.4 km	MPC · JPL
840932	2015 FK_{8}	—	January 24, 2015	Haleakala	Pan-STARRS 1	EUN	760 m	MPC · JPL
840933	2015 FB_{12}	—	February 18, 2015	Kitt Peak	Research and Education Collaborative Occultation Network	·	1.3 km	MPC · JPL
840934	2015 FY_{13}	—	April 14, 2010	Kitt Peak	Spacewatch	EOS	1.6 km	MPC · JPL
840935	2015 FR_{16}	—	March 16, 2015	Haleakala	Pan-STARRS 1	PHO	690 m	MPC · JPL
840936	2015 FE_{26}	—	April 25, 2007	Mount Lemmon	Mount Lemmon Survey	EUN	830 m	MPC · JPL
840937	2015 FP_{26}	—	September 19, 1998	Sacramento Peak	SDSS	·	2.0 km	MPC · JPL
840938	2015 FP_{27}	—	March 16, 2015	Haleakala	Pan-STARRS 1	·	1.2 km	MPC · JPL
840939	2015 FN_{30}	—	December 18, 2001	Sacramento Peak	SDSS	MAR	1.3 km	MPC · JPL
840940	2015 FD_{33}	—	July 16, 2010	WISE	WISE	·	2.4 km	MPC · JPL
840941	2015 FJ_{33}	—	September 16, 2003	Palomar	NEAT	H	440 m	MPC · JPL
840942	2015 FT_{40}	—	March 17, 2015	Haleakala	Pan-STARRS 1	·	670 m	MPC · JPL
840943	2015 FV_{40}	—	March 17, 2015	Haleakala	Pan-STARRS 1	·	510 m	MPC · JPL
840944	2015 FD_{41}	—	May 11, 2010	WISE	WISE	THB	2.2 km	MPC · JPL
840945	2015 FM_{41}	—	March 17, 2015	Haleakala	Pan-STARRS 1	·	1.4 km	MPC · JPL
840946	2015 FT_{41}	—	April 25, 2004	Kitt Peak	Spacewatch	·	1.8 km	MPC · JPL
840947	2015 FR_{42}	—	April 9, 2010	WISE	WISE	LIX	2.4 km	MPC · JPL
840948	2015 FW_{45}	—	January 11, 2002	Cerro Tololo	Deep Lens Survey	H	480 m	MPC · JPL
840949	2015 FP_{49}	—	October 13, 2013	Mount Lemmon	Mount Lemmon Survey	·	910 m	MPC · JPL
840950	2015 FU_{52}	—	February 19, 2015	Haleakala	Pan-STARRS 1	·	950 m	MPC · JPL
840951	2015 FV_{52}	—	November 8, 2009	Mount Lemmon	Mount Lemmon Survey	·	1.5 km	MPC · JPL
840952	2015 FZ_{52}	—	March 18, 2015	Haleakala	Pan-STARRS 1	·	2.4 km	MPC · JPL
840953	2015 FA_{53}	—	January 19, 2015	Haleakala	Pan-STARRS 1	THB	1.8 km	MPC · JPL
840954	2015 FY_{53}	—	June 8, 2010	WISE	WISE	·	3.1 km	MPC · JPL
840955	2015 FX_{58}	—	May 5, 2010	Mount Lemmon	Mount Lemmon Survey	·	3.5 km	MPC · JPL
840956	2015 FF_{59}	—	July 22, 2010	WISE	WISE	EUP	2.5 km	MPC · JPL
840957	2015 FS_{59}	—	May 18, 2010	WISE	WISE	·	1.5 km	MPC · JPL
840958	2015 FW_{61}	—	January 22, 2015	Haleakala	Pan-STARRS 1	·	2.4 km	MPC · JPL
840959	2015 FX_{64}	—	January 20, 2015	Haleakala	Pan-STARRS 1	JUN	780 m	MPC · JPL
840960	2015 FQ_{67}	—	February 19, 2015	Haleakala	Pan-STARRS 1	·	1.1 km	MPC · JPL
840961	2015 FL_{68}	—	May 21, 2011	Mount Lemmon	Mount Lemmon Survey	·	1.1 km	MPC · JPL
840962	2015 FC_{69}	—	April 7, 2010	Kitt Peak	Spacewatch	·	1.8 km	MPC · JPL
840963	2015 FD_{69}	—	March 18, 2015	Haleakala	Pan-STARRS 1	·	1.4 km	MPC · JPL
840964	2015 FN_{70}	—	February 16, 2015	Haleakala	Pan-STARRS 1	·	1.1 km	MPC · JPL
840965	2015 FK_{73}	—	March 18, 2015	Haleakala	Pan-STARRS 1	·	2.1 km	MPC · JPL
840966	2015 FP_{74}	—	April 12, 2010	WISE	WISE	ADE	1.6 km	MPC · JPL
840967	2015 FP_{82}	—	January 15, 2010	WISE	WISE	·	2.6 km	MPC · JPL
840968	2015 FR_{82}	—	January 20, 2015	Haleakala	Pan-STARRS 1	·	1.2 km	MPC · JPL
840969	2015 FL_{83}	—	March 20, 2015	Haleakala	Pan-STARRS 1	·	2.1 km	MPC · JPL
840970	2015 FD_{85}	—	October 23, 2013	Mount Lemmon	Mount Lemmon Survey	·	710 m	MPC · JPL
840971	2015 FO_{85}	—	March 20, 2015	Haleakala	Pan-STARRS 1	HNS	890 m	MPC · JPL
840972	2015 FY_{85}	—	February 10, 2010	WISE	WISE	LIX	2.8 km	MPC · JPL
840973	2015 FF_{87}	—	January 17, 2010	WISE	WISE	·	1.6 km	MPC · JPL
840974	2015 FT_{87}	—	May 24, 2010	WISE	WISE	·	2.4 km	MPC · JPL
840975	2015 FX_{88}	—	October 26, 2009	Kitt Peak	Spacewatch	·	820 m	MPC · JPL
840976	2015 FA_{91}	—	January 3, 2009	Mount Lemmon	Mount Lemmon Survey	·	2.2 km	MPC · JPL
840977	2015 FX_{91}	—	January 24, 2015	Haleakala	Pan-STARRS 1	·	1.1 km	MPC · JPL
840978	2015 FJ_{95}	—	March 20, 1999	Sacramento Peak	SDSS	·	2.1 km	MPC · JPL
840979	2015 FF_{101}	—	January 20, 2015	Haleakala	Pan-STARRS 1	·	1.1 km	MPC · JPL
840980	2015 FA_{105}	—	March 20, 2015	Haleakala	Pan-STARRS 1	·	1.1 km	MPC · JPL
840981	2015 FM_{105}	—	January 22, 2015	Haleakala	Pan-STARRS 1	·	1.0 km	MPC · JPL
840982	2015 FH_{106}	—	March 20, 2015	Haleakala	Pan-STARRS 1	·	1.2 km	MPC · JPL
840983	2015 FX_{110}	—	July 28, 2010	WISE	WISE	EUP	2.8 km	MPC · JPL
840984	2015 FV_{112}	—	March 20, 2015	Haleakala	Pan-STARRS 1	·	580 m	MPC · JPL
840985	2015 FU_{113}	—	April 6, 2010	WISE	WISE	EUN	840 m	MPC · JPL
840986	2015 FW_{113}	—	September 13, 2007	Kitt Peak	Spacewatch	·	1.5 km	MPC · JPL
840987	2015 FU_{114}	—	June 21, 2012	Mount Lemmon	Mount Lemmon Survey	·	560 m	MPC · JPL
840988	2015 FZ_{115}	—	April 15, 2010	Mount Lemmon	Mount Lemmon Survey	·	1.5 km	MPC · JPL
840989	2015 FN_{119}	—	February 9, 2010	Catalina	CSS	·	2.3 km	MPC · JPL
840990	2015 FC_{121}	—	May 22, 2011	Mount Lemmon	Mount Lemmon Survey	·	860 m	MPC · JPL
840991	2015 FB_{126}	—	January 15, 2010	WISE	WISE	EUP	2.6 km	MPC · JPL
840992	2015 FJ_{126}	—	January 17, 2015	Haleakala	Pan-STARRS 1	·	1.9 km	MPC · JPL
840993	2015 FX_{128}	—	May 27, 2010	WISE	WISE	·	2.2 km	MPC · JPL
840994	2015 FB_{129}	—	February 17, 2010	Kitt Peak	Spacewatch	·	2.3 km	MPC · JPL
840995	2015 FP_{129}	—	January 14, 2015	Haleakala	Pan-STARRS 1	H	380 m	MPC · JPL
840996	2015 FB_{130}	—	January 14, 2015	Haleakala	Pan-STARRS 1	·	1.2 km	MPC · JPL
840997	2015 FG_{130}	—	April 11, 2010	WISE	WISE	·	2.2 km	MPC · JPL
840998	2015 FL_{137}	—	March 11, 2008	Kitt Peak	Spacewatch	·	550 m	MPC · JPL
840999	2015 FB_{138}	—	March 21, 2015	Haleakala	Pan-STARRS 1	GEF	700 m	MPC · JPL
841000	2015 FP_{139}	—	March 29, 2010	WISE	WISE	(69559)	2.4 km	MPC · JPL

back to top
