= List of minor planets: 740001–741000 =

The following is a partial list of minor planets, running from minor-planet number 740001 through 741000, inclusive. The primary data for this and other partial lists is based on JPL's "Small-Body Orbital Elements" and data available from the Minor Planet Center. Critical list information is also provided by the MPC, unless otherwise specified from Lowell Observatory. A detailed description of the table's columns and additional sources are given on the main page including a complete list of every page in this series, and a statistical break-up on the dynamical classification of minor planets.

Also see the summary list of all named bodies in numerical and alphabetical order, and the corresponding naming citations for the number range of this particular list. New namings may only be added to this list after official publication, as the preannouncement of names is condemned by the Working Group for Small Bodies Nomenclature of the International Astronomical Union.

Near-Earth obj.	MBA (inner)	MBA (outer)	Centaur
Mars-crosser	MBA (middle)	Jupiter trojan	Trans-Neptunian obj.
Unclassified

== 740001–740100 ==
Designation			Discovery			Properties		Ref
Permanent	Provisional	Named after	Date	Site	Discoverer(s)	Category	Diam.	Ref
740001	1991 TM_{16}	—	November 12, 1991	Kitt Peak	Spacewatch	·	1.2 km	MPC · JPL
740002	1994 TZ_{12}	—	October 10, 1994	Kitt Peak	Spacewatch	·	1.6 km	MPC · JPL
740003	1995 BC_{10}	—	January 29, 1995	Kitt Peak	Spacewatch	·	590 m	MPC · JPL
740004	1995 OD_{16}	—	July 26, 1995	Kitt Peak	Spacewatch	·	660 m	MPC · JPL
740005	1995 QJ_{6}	—	August 22, 1995	Kitt Peak	Spacewatch	·	2.6 km	MPC · JPL
740006	1995 QL_{12}	—	August 22, 1995	Kitt Peak	Spacewatch	(5)	1.0 km	MPC · JPL
740007	1995 QG_{17}	—	August 28, 1995	Kitt Peak	Spacewatch	·	680 m	MPC · JPL
740008	1995 SF_{8}	—	September 17, 1995	Kitt Peak	Spacewatch	·	780 m	MPC · JPL
740009	1995 SG_{23}	—	September 19, 1995	Kitt Peak	Spacewatch	·	1.7 km	MPC · JPL
740010	1995 SG_{52}	—	September 27, 1995	Kitt Peak	Spacewatch	·	1.2 km	MPC · JPL
740011	1995 SC_{57}	—	September 17, 1995	Kitt Peak	Spacewatch	·	1.8 km	MPC · JPL
740012	1995 SR_{59}	—	September 19, 1995	Kitt Peak	Spacewatch	·	1.7 km	MPC · JPL
740013	1995 SD_{84}	—	September 24, 1995	Kitt Peak	Spacewatch	·	1.0 km	MPC · JPL
740014	1995 TD_{10}	—	October 2, 1995	Kitt Peak	Spacewatch	·	990 m	MPC · JPL
740015	1995 UF_{62}	—	October 25, 1995	Kitt Peak	Spacewatch	·	900 m	MPC · JPL
740016	1995 UJ_{67}	—	October 18, 1995	Kitt Peak	Spacewatch	·	590 m	MPC · JPL
740017	1995 UH_{80}	—	October 24, 1995	Kitt Peak	Spacewatch	·	2.1 km	MPC · JPL
740018	1995 WG_{28}	—	November 19, 1995	Kitt Peak	Spacewatch	·	1.2 km	MPC · JPL
740019	1996 ET_{14}	—	March 12, 1996	Kitt Peak	Spacewatch	·	1.2 km	MPC · JPL
740020	1996 FP_{14}	—	March 19, 1996	Kitt Peak	Spacewatch	·	1.0 km	MPC · JPL
740021	1996 TY_{22}	—	October 6, 1996	Kitt Peak	Spacewatch	·	2.4 km	MPC · JPL
740022	1996 TH_{32}	—	October 9, 1996	Kitt Peak	Spacewatch	T_{j} (2.98) · EUP	2.5 km	MPC · JPL
740023	1996 TY_{32}	—	October 10, 1996	Kitt Peak	Spacewatch	·	2.7 km	MPC · JPL
740024	1997 AF_{12}	—	January 10, 1997	Kitt Peak	Spacewatch	·	1.5 km	MPC · JPL
740025	1997 GU_{24}	—	April 10, 1997	Kitt Peak	Spacewatch	·	690 m	MPC · JPL
740026	1997 GL_{27}	—	April 9, 1997	Kitt Peak	Spacewatch	·	1.1 km	MPC · JPL
740027	1997 MM_{12}	—	June 26, 1997	Kitt Peak	Spacewatch	·	1.7 km	MPC · JPL
740028	1997 SE_{20}	—	September 28, 1997	Kitt Peak	Spacewatch	·	760 m	MPC · JPL
740029	1998 BJ_{21}	—	January 22, 1998	Kitt Peak	Spacewatch	V	590 m	MPC · JPL
740030	1998 BJ_{29}	—	January 25, 1998	Kitt Peak	Spacewatch	·	910 m	MPC · JPL
740031	1998 GF_{13}	—	February 26, 2012	Kitt Peak	Spacewatch	·	780 m	MPC · JPL
740032	1998 KG_{69}	—	February 9, 2016	Haleakala	Pan-STARRS 1	DOR	1.9 km	MPC · JPL
740033	1998 MN	—	June 17, 1998	Kitt Peak	Spacewatch	PHO	920 m	MPC · JPL
740034	1998 QE_{3}	—	July 26, 1998	Kitt Peak	Spacewatch	·	670 m	MPC · JPL
740035	1998 RB_{10}	—	September 13, 1998	Kitt Peak	Spacewatch	NYS	1.1 km	MPC · JPL
740036	1998 RO_{15}	—	September 15, 1998	Kitt Peak	Spacewatch	·	2.5 km	MPC · JPL
740037	1998 SL_{15}	—	September 16, 1998	Kitt Peak	Spacewatch	·	900 m	MPC · JPL
740038	1998 SJ_{27}	—	September 18, 1998	Socorro	LINEAR	·	780 m	MPC · JPL
740039	1998 SJ_{52}	—	September 28, 1998	Kitt Peak	Spacewatch	·	910 m	MPC · JPL
740040	1998 ST_{179}	—	September 19, 1998	Apache Point	SDSS	·	1.6 km	MPC · JPL
740041	1998 TF_{26}	—	October 14, 1998	Kitt Peak	Spacewatch	·	1.2 km	MPC · JPL
740042	1998 WN_{26}	—	November 16, 1998	Kitt Peak	Spacewatch	·	2.2 km	MPC · JPL
740043	1998 WR_{29}	—	November 23, 1998	Kitt Peak	Spacewatch	·	1.9 km	MPC · JPL
740044	1998 WL_{46}	—	January 29, 2009	Mount Lemmon	Mount Lemmon Survey	MRX	830 m	MPC · JPL
740045	1999 AE_{33}	—	January 15, 1999	Kitt Peak	Spacewatch	·	2.2 km	MPC · JPL
740046	1999 AJ_{36}	—	July 26, 2017	Haleakala	Pan-STARRS 1	·	1.7 km	MPC · JPL
740047	1999 CD_{129}	—	May 1, 2016	Cerro Tololo	DECam	EOS	1.4 km	MPC · JPL
740048	1999 CG_{155}	—	July 10, 2019	Haleakala	Pan-STARRS 1	·	1.2 km	MPC · JPL
740049	1999 FL_{98}	—	September 7, 2000	Kitt Peak	Spacewatch	H	460 m	MPC · JPL
740050	1999 GC_{64}	—	October 1, 2013	Mount Lemmon	Mount Lemmon Survey	·	2.4 km	MPC · JPL
740051	1999 JE_{16}	—	May 15, 1999	Kitt Peak	Spacewatch	·	540 m	MPC · JPL
740052	1999 PK_{9}	—	October 28, 2013	Mount Lemmon	Mount Lemmon Survey	·	550 m	MPC · JPL
740053	1999 RC_{7}	—	September 3, 1999	Kitt Peak	Spacewatch	·	650 m	MPC · JPL
740054	1999 RV_{250}	—	September 5, 1999	Kitt Peak	Spacewatch	·	850 m	MPC · JPL
740055	1999 RG_{252}	—	November 19, 2003	Kitt Peak	Spacewatch	·	770 m	MPC · JPL
740056	1999 RF_{260}	—	July 14, 2015	Haleakala	Pan-STARRS 1	·	960 m	MPC · JPL
740057	1999 RL_{260}	—	March 7, 2014	Mount Lemmon	Mount Lemmon Survey	·	1.1 km	MPC · JPL
740058	1999 RT_{260}	—	October 1, 2010	Kitt Peak	Spacewatch	MAS	550 m	MPC · JPL
740059	1999 SB_{25}	—	September 30, 1999	Catalina	CSS	·	640 m	MPC · JPL
740060	1999 TW_{43}	—	October 3, 1999	Kitt Peak	Spacewatch	WIT	790 m	MPC · JPL
740061	1999 TR_{85}	—	October 14, 1999	Kitt Peak	Spacewatch	·	670 m	MPC · JPL
740062	1999 TP_{297}	—	October 2, 1999	Kitt Peak	Spacewatch	·	1.8 km	MPC · JPL
740063	1999 TZ_{337}	—	July 8, 2008	Mount Lemmon	Mount Lemmon Survey	·	1.6 km	MPC · JPL
740064	1999 TY_{338}	—	October 28, 2008	Kitt Peak	Spacewatch	·	1.2 km	MPC · JPL
740065	1999 TF_{339}	—	February 26, 2014	Mount Lemmon	Mount Lemmon Survey	·	1.2 km	MPC · JPL
740066	1999 UU_{32}	—	October 31, 1999	Kitt Peak	Spacewatch	·	770 m	MPC · JPL
740067	1999 VQ_{14}	—	November 10, 1999	Kitt Peak	M. W. Buie	EUN	980 m	MPC · JPL
740068	1999 VV_{128}	—	November 9, 1999	Kitt Peak	Spacewatch	MAS	540 m	MPC · JPL
740069	1999 VR_{153}	—	November 11, 1999	Kitt Peak	Spacewatch	·	1.7 km	MPC · JPL
740070	1999 VH_{233}	—	January 9, 2016	Haleakala	Pan-STARRS 1	·	1.4 km	MPC · JPL
740071	1999 VB_{234}	—	November 25, 2016	Mount Lemmon	Mount Lemmon Survey	KON	1.9 km	MPC · JPL
740072	1999 WU_{15}	—	November 29, 1999	Kitt Peak	Spacewatch	·	1.3 km	MPC · JPL
740073	1999 WA_{28}	—	July 7, 2014	Haleakala	Pan-STARRS 1	MAS	690 m	MPC · JPL
740074	1999 WP_{28}	—	November 16, 1999	Kitt Peak	Spacewatch	·	850 m	MPC · JPL
740075	1999 XN_{149}	—	December 8, 1999	Kitt Peak	Spacewatch	·	1.7 km	MPC · JPL
740076	1999 YD_{30}	—	December 17, 1999	Kitt Peak	Spacewatch	·	1.7 km	MPC · JPL
740077	2000 AZ_{258}	—	May 7, 2014	Haleakala	Pan-STARRS 1	·	650 m	MPC · JPL
740078	2000 AD_{259}	—	December 17, 2003	Kitt Peak	Spacewatch	(1547)	1.1 km	MPC · JPL
740079	2000 AN_{259}	—	November 11, 2010	Mount Lemmon	Mount Lemmon Survey	·	880 m	MPC · JPL
740080	2000 BS_{21}	—	January 29, 2000	Kitt Peak	Spacewatch	·	1.9 km	MPC · JPL
740081	2000 CG_{144}	—	February 6, 2000	Kitt Peak	Spacewatch	·	1.2 km	MPC · JPL
740082	2000 CB_{152}	—	February 5, 2000	Kitt Peak	Spacewatch	·	900 m	MPC · JPL
740083	2000 CS_{152}	—	April 28, 2014	Haleakala	Pan-STARRS 1	MIS	1.9 km	MPC · JPL
740084	2000 CU_{152}	—	February 12, 2000	Apache Point	SDSS	·	2.2 km	MPC · JPL
740085	2000 CA_{154}	—	February 18, 2013	Mount Lemmon	Mount Lemmon Survey	·	1.6 km	MPC · JPL
740086	2000 CR_{154}	—	March 21, 2017	Haleakala	Pan-STARRS 1	·	970 m	MPC · JPL
740087	2000 DL_{90}	—	February 27, 2000	Kitt Peak	Spacewatch	·	1.3 km	MPC · JPL
740088	2000 DL_{118}	—	March 6, 2011	Kitt Peak	Spacewatch	EOS	1.4 km	MPC · JPL
740089	2000 EM_{99}	—	March 12, 2000	Kitt Peak	Spacewatch	·	1.3 km	MPC · JPL
740090	2000 EU_{175}	—	March 3, 2000	Socorro	LINEAR	·	1.6 km	MPC · JPL
740091	2000 EH_{210}	—	April 2, 2006	Mount Lemmon	Mount Lemmon Survey	THB	2.0 km	MPC · JPL
740092	2000 EM_{210}	—	April 2, 2009	Kitt Peak	Spacewatch	·	1.1 km	MPC · JPL
740093	2000 EN_{211}	—	February 25, 2011	Mount Lemmon	Mount Lemmon Survey	·	830 m	MPC · JPL
740094	2000 EE_{212}	—	February 9, 2016	Haleakala	Pan-STARRS 1	·	2.4 km	MPC · JPL
740095	2000 FJ_{9}	—	March 30, 2000	Kitt Peak	Spacewatch	·	1.1 km	MPC · JPL
740096	2000 FT_{74}	—	March 25, 2000	Kitt Peak	Spacewatch	·	2.3 km	MPC · JPL
740097	2000 GV_{45}	—	February 26, 2000	Kitt Peak	Spacewatch	·	1.5 km	MPC · JPL
740098	2000 HE_{106}	—	October 9, 2013	Mount Lemmon	Mount Lemmon Survey	EOS	1.7 km	MPC · JPL
740099	2000 JD_{96}	—	October 24, 2011	Kitt Peak	Spacewatch	HNS	920 m	MPC · JPL
740100	2000 JQ_{97}	—	February 15, 2015	Haleakala	Pan-STARRS 1	·	790 m	MPC · JPL

== 740101–740200 ==
back to top

Designation			Discovery			Properties		Ref
Permanent	Provisional	Named after	Date	Site	Discoverer(s)	Category	Diam.	Ref
740101	2000 KQ_{40}	—	May 30, 2000	Kitt Peak	Spacewatch	·	2.6 km	MPC · JPL
740102	2000 OW_{71}	—	February 20, 2015	Haleakala	Pan-STARRS 1	·	2.5 km	MPC · JPL
740103	2000 OC_{73}	—	November 26, 2010	Mount Lemmon	Mount Lemmon Survey	·	1.4 km	MPC · JPL
740104	2000 PB_{33}	—	February 7, 2008	Mount Lemmon	Mount Lemmon Survey	·	3.2 km	MPC · JPL
740105	2000 QL_{74}	—	August 24, 2000	Socorro	LINEAR	·	820 m	MPC · JPL
740106	2000 QW_{179}	—	August 30, 2000	Kitt Peak	Spacewatch	·	1.9 km	MPC · JPL
740107	2000 QT_{238}	—	August 25, 2000	Cerro Tololo	Deep Ecliptic Survey	·	470 m	MPC · JPL
740108	2000 QE_{240}	—	August 25, 2000	Cerro Tololo	Deep Ecliptic Survey	KOR	860 m	MPC · JPL
740109	2000 QZ_{247}	—	August 31, 2000	Kitt Peak	Spacewatch	·	700 m	MPC · JPL
740110	2000 QK_{256}	—	March 31, 2008	Catalina	CSS	·	1.6 km	MPC · JPL
740111	2000 QN_{259}	—	January 26, 2017	Mount Lemmon	Mount Lemmon Survey	·	1.4 km	MPC · JPL
740112	2000 RR_{13}	—	September 1, 2000	Socorro	LINEAR	·	1.0 km	MPC · JPL
740113	2000 RL_{109}	—	November 6, 2013	Haleakala	Pan-STARRS 1	KON	1.6 km	MPC · JPL
740114	2000 RR_{109}	—	September 27, 2006	Kitt Peak	Spacewatch	·	2.9 km	MPC · JPL
740115	2000 RY_{110}	—	November 11, 2010	Kitt Peak	Spacewatch	·	1.7 km	MPC · JPL
740116	2000 RY_{111}	—	December 18, 2015	Mount Lemmon	Mount Lemmon Survey	·	1.4 km	MPC · JPL
740117	2000 RF_{112}	—	August 18, 2014	Haleakala	Pan-STARRS 1	DOR	1.8 km	MPC · JPL
740118	2000 SH_{240}	—	September 25, 2000	Socorro	LINEAR	PHO	900 m	MPC · JPL
740119	2000 SH_{340}	—	September 2, 2000	Anderson Mesa	LONEOS	H	540 m	MPC · JPL
740120	2000 SG_{379}	—	December 6, 2011	Haleakala	Pan-STARRS 1	·	2.0 km	MPC · JPL
740121	2000 SF_{380}	—	September 4, 2011	Kitt Peak	Spacewatch	MAS	590 m	MPC · JPL
740122	2000 SB_{382}	—	September 17, 2014	Haleakala	Pan-STARRS 1	·	1.7 km	MPC · JPL
740123	2000 TW_{64}	—	October 1, 2000	Socorro	LINEAR	EUN	1.1 km	MPC · JPL
740124	2000 TV_{75}	—	December 11, 2013	Mount Lemmon	Mount Lemmon Survey	·	1.0 km	MPC · JPL
740125	2000 TW_{77}	—	October 27, 2000	Kitt Peak	Spacewatch	·	2.2 km	MPC · JPL
740126	2000 TP_{79}	—	August 12, 2015	Haleakala	Pan-STARRS 1	PHO	810 m	MPC · JPL
740127	2000 TY_{80}	—	February 3, 2009	Kitt Peak	Spacewatch	·	620 m	MPC · JPL
740128	2000 TB_{82}	—	October 1, 2014	Haleakala	Pan-STARRS 1	·	830 m	MPC · JPL
740129	2000 UG_{116}	—	October 19, 2000	Kitt Peak	Spacewatch	·	1.1 km	MPC · JPL
740130	2000 VM_{19}	—	November 1, 2000	Socorro	LINEAR	(5)	1.1 km	MPC · JPL
740131	2000 VY_{65}	—	September 11, 2010	Catalina	CSS	·	580 m	MPC · JPL
740132	2000 WS_{112}	—	November 20, 2000	Socorro	LINEAR	·	2.1 km	MPC · JPL
740133	2000 WC_{127}	—	November 17, 2000	Kitt Peak	Spacewatch	·	870 m	MPC · JPL
740134	2000 WW_{169}	—	November 22, 2000	Haleakala	NEAT	·	1.4 km	MPC · JPL
740135	2000 WP_{200}	—	September 23, 2005	Kitt Peak	Spacewatch	THM	2.0 km	MPC · JPL
740136	2000 WJ_{201}	—	September 13, 2005	Kitt Peak	Spacewatch	·	1.8 km	MPC · JPL
740137	2000 WD_{203}	—	September 28, 2009	Kitt Peak	Spacewatch	·	1.6 km	MPC · JPL
740138	2000 WB_{205}	—	December 4, 2016	Mount Lemmon	Mount Lemmon Survey	H	530 m	MPC · JPL
740139	2000 YD_{146}	—	August 28, 2017	Mount Lemmon	Mount Lemmon Survey	·	540 m	MPC · JPL
740140	2001 BB_{52}	—	January 17, 2001	Kitt Peak	Spacewatch	·	560 m	MPC · JPL
740141	2001 CS_{50}	—	February 2, 2001	Kitt Peak	Spacewatch	·	2.1 km	MPC · JPL
740142	2001 DP_{81}	—	February 19, 2001	Socorro	LINEAR	·	360 m	MPC · JPL
740143	2001 DN_{114}	—	December 7, 2012	Nogales	M. Schwartz, P. R. Holvorcem	(5)	1.1 km	MPC · JPL
740144	2001 DQ_{117}	—	May 23, 2014	Haleakala	Pan-STARRS 1	·	1.1 km	MPC · JPL
740145	2001 DR_{117}	—	January 14, 2011	Mount Lemmon	Mount Lemmon Survey	TEL	1.1 km	MPC · JPL
740146	2001 DB_{120}	—	February 22, 2011	Kitt Peak	Spacewatch	·	570 m	MPC · JPL
740147	2001 EZ_{27}	—	February 13, 2008	Mount Lemmon	Mount Lemmon Survey	·	770 m	MPC · JPL
740148	2001 FU_{85}	—	March 26, 2001	Cerro Tololo	Deep Lens Survey	·	1.9 km	MPC · JPL
740149	2001 FL_{230}	—	March 29, 2001	Kitt Peak	SKADS	HNS	730 m	MPC · JPL
740150	2001 FU_{244}	—	September 28, 2003	Kitt Peak	Spacewatch	EUN	1.1 km	MPC · JPL
740151	2001 HL_{70}	—	January 8, 2011	Mount Lemmon	Mount Lemmon Survey	·	580 m	MPC · JPL
740152	2001 KK_{81}	—	October 24, 2009	Kitt Peak	Spacewatch	·	760 m	MPC · JPL
740153	2001 KK_{83}	—	July 8, 2015	Haleakala	Pan-STARRS 1	·	1.4 km	MPC · JPL
740154	2001 KJ_{84}	—	May 24, 2001	Apache Point	SDSS	·	3.0 km	MPC · JPL
740155	2001 KG_{86}	—	April 3, 2016	Mount Lemmon	Mount Lemmon Survey	·	2.0 km	MPC · JPL
740156	2001 LD_{20}	—	March 31, 2009	Kitt Peak	Spacewatch	EUN	720 m	MPC · JPL
740157	2001 MT_{31}	—	December 3, 2015	Haleakala	Pan-STARRS 1	·	2.7 km	MPC · JPL
740158	2001 OZ_{3}	—	July 18, 2001	Palomar	NEAT	·	1 km	MPC · JPL
740159	2001 OK_{31}	—	July 19, 2001	Palomar	NEAT	BRG	1.2 km	MPC · JPL
740160	2001 ON_{114}	—	October 6, 2008	Mount Lemmon	Mount Lemmon Survey	·	690 m	MPC · JPL
740161	2001 QU_{87}	—	August 14, 2001	Haleakala	NEAT	·	1.0 km	MPC · JPL
740162	2001 QH_{111}	—	July 31, 2001	Palomar	NEAT	·	1.6 km	MPC · JPL
740163	2001 QS_{286}	—	August 17, 2001	Palomar	NEAT	·	2.8 km	MPC · JPL
740164	2001 QX_{304}	—	August 19, 2001	Cerro Tololo	Deep Ecliptic Survey	·	2.0 km	MPC · JPL
740165	2001 QN_{335}	—	October 16, 2001	Palomar	NEAT	·	1.2 km	MPC · JPL
740166	2001 QZ_{336}	—	July 28, 2014	Haleakala	Pan-STARRS 1	·	480 m	MPC · JPL
740167	2001 QB_{338}	—	August 13, 2012	Haleakala	Pan-STARRS 1	·	2.5 km	MPC · JPL
740168	2001 RK_{23}	—	September 7, 2001	Socorro	LINEAR	·	1.6 km	MPC · JPL
740169	2001 RF_{47}	—	August 11, 2001	Haleakala	NEAT	H	520 m	MPC · JPL
740170	2001 RD_{104}	—	September 12, 2001	Socorro	LINEAR	·	830 m	MPC · JPL
740171	2001 RB_{105}	—	September 12, 2001	Socorro	LINEAR	·	2.4 km	MPC · JPL
740172	2001 RS_{156}	—	January 21, 2012	Haleakala	Pan-STARRS 1	·	1.1 km	MPC · JPL
740173	2001 ST_{62}	—	September 17, 2001	Socorro	LINEAR	·	1.0 km	MPC · JPL
740174	2001 SH_{76}	—	September 8, 2001	Socorro	LINEAR	·	900 m	MPC · JPL
740175	2001 SM_{83}	—	September 20, 2001	Socorro	LINEAR	TIR	2.5 km	MPC · JPL
740176	2001 SW_{93}	—	September 11, 2001	Socorro	LINEAR	T_{j} (2.98)	2.9 km	MPC · JPL
740177	2001 SM_{112}	—	September 19, 2001	Socorro	LINEAR	H	400 m	MPC · JPL
740178	2001 SU_{144}	—	September 16, 2001	Socorro	LINEAR	·	1.2 km	MPC · JPL
740179	2001 SJ_{165}	—	August 25, 2001	Socorro	LINEAR	·	660 m	MPC · JPL
740180	2001 SU_{169}	—	September 21, 2001	Palomar	NEAT	H	500 m	MPC · JPL
740181	2001 SH_{208}	—	September 19, 2001	Socorro	LINEAR	·	1.4 km	MPC · JPL
740182	2001 SK_{221}	—	September 19, 2001	Socorro	LINEAR	·	550 m	MPC · JPL
740183	2001 SH_{224}	—	September 19, 2001	Socorro	LINEAR	·	1.5 km	MPC · JPL
740184	2001 SJ_{224}	—	September 19, 2001	Socorro	LINEAR	EUN	1.0 km	MPC · JPL
740185	2001 SK_{228}	—	September 19, 2001	Kitt Peak	Spacewatch	NYS	950 m	MPC · JPL
740186	2001 SK_{301}	—	September 12, 2001	Kitt Peak	Spacewatch	·	2.4 km	MPC · JPL
740187	2001 SD_{306}	—	September 20, 2001	Socorro	LINEAR	(5931)	2.6 km	MPC · JPL
740188	2001 SO_{333}	—	September 19, 2001	Socorro	LINEAR	T_{j} (2.99)	2.2 km	MPC · JPL
740189	2001 SC_{361}	—	April 6, 2017	Mount Lemmon	Mount Lemmon Survey	EUN	930 m	MPC · JPL
740190	2001 ST_{361}	—	October 14, 2013	Mount Lemmon	Mount Lemmon Survey	·	2.5 km	MPC · JPL
740191	2001 SY_{361}	—	August 14, 2012	Haleakala	Pan-STARRS 1	·	2.5 km	MPC · JPL
740192	2001 SS_{362}	—	March 10, 2016	Haleakala	Pan-STARRS 1	H	390 m	MPC · JPL
740193	2001 TR_{140}	—	October 10, 2001	Palomar	NEAT	NYS	910 m	MPC · JPL
740194	2001 TB_{216}	—	October 13, 2001	Palomar	NEAT	·	1.3 km	MPC · JPL
740195	2001 TU_{224}	—	October 14, 2001	Socorro	LINEAR	·	990 m	MPC · JPL
740196	2001 TV_{261}	—	October 13, 2001	Palomar	NEAT	·	620 m	MPC · JPL
740197	2001 TO_{264}	—	October 13, 2001	Kitt Peak	Spacewatch	·	1.1 km	MPC · JPL
740198	2001 TT_{264}	—	October 18, 2012	Haleakala	Pan-STARRS 1	EOS	1.6 km	MPC · JPL
740199	2001 TG_{265}	—	October 14, 2001	Apache Point	SDSS	·	1.0 km	MPC · JPL
740200	2001 UT_{140}	—	October 17, 2001	Socorro	LINEAR	·	1.2 km	MPC · JPL

== 740201–740300 ==
back to top

Designation			Discovery			Properties		Ref
Permanent	Provisional	Named after	Date	Site	Discoverer(s)	Category	Diam.	Ref
740201	2001 UW_{171}	—	October 18, 2001	Palomar	NEAT	MAS	680 m	MPC · JPL
740202	2001 UQ_{196}	—	October 18, 2001	Palomar	NEAT	H	550 m	MPC · JPL
740203	2001 UX_{199}	—	September 21, 2001	Socorro	LINEAR	TIR	2.3 km	MPC · JPL
740204	2001 UK_{211}	—	October 21, 2001	Socorro	LINEAR	NYS	820 m	MPC · JPL
740205	2001 UT_{214}	—	October 23, 2001	Socorro	LINEAR	·	1.0 km	MPC · JPL
740206	2001 UG_{239}	—	September 29, 2010	Mount Lemmon	Mount Lemmon Survey	·	1.3 km	MPC · JPL
740207	2001 UO_{239}	—	October 25, 2005	Mount Lemmon	Mount Lemmon Survey	·	1.1 km	MPC · JPL
740208	2001 VL_{3}	—	October 18, 2001	Kitt Peak	Spacewatch	·	2.5 km	MPC · JPL
740209	2001 VW_{5}	—	October 21, 2001	Socorro	LINEAR	·	2.1 km	MPC · JPL
740210	2001 VL_{67}	—	October 15, 2001	Socorro	LINEAR	·	2.3 km	MPC · JPL
740211	2001 VV_{134}	—	December 31, 2011	Kitt Peak	Spacewatch	·	540 m	MPC · JPL
740212	2001 VL_{136}	—	March 2, 2017	Mount Lemmon	Mount Lemmon Survey	·	1.8 km	MPC · JPL
740213	2001 VO_{137}	—	November 11, 2001	Kitt Peak	Spacewatch	L5	7.5 km	MPC · JPL
740214	2001 WZ_{19}	—	November 17, 2001	Socorro	LINEAR	·	550 m	MPC · JPL
740215	2001 WZ_{43}	—	October 24, 2001	Socorro	LINEAR	·	3.1 km	MPC · JPL
740216	2001 WB_{47}	—	November 20, 2001	Socorro	LINEAR	·	540 m	MPC · JPL
740217	2001 WG_{57}	—	November 19, 2001	Socorro	LINEAR	·	2.0 km	MPC · JPL
740218	2001 WL_{76}	—	November 20, 2001	Socorro	LINEAR	·	490 m	MPC · JPL
740219	2001 WD_{77}	—	November 20, 2001	Kitt Peak	Spacewatch	·	2.7 km	MPC · JPL
740220	2001 WO_{78}	—	November 20, 2001	Socorro	LINEAR	·	690 m	MPC · JPL
740221	2001 WF_{88}	—	November 19, 2001	Socorro	LINEAR	·	2.9 km	MPC · JPL
740222	2001 WS_{94}	—	November 20, 2001	Socorro	LINEAR	·	2.0 km	MPC · JPL
740223	2001 WH_{105}	—	February 16, 2015	Haleakala	Pan-STARRS 1	VER	1.9 km	MPC · JPL
740224	2001 WL_{105}	—	November 17, 2004	Campo Imperatore	CINEOS	·	620 m	MPC · JPL
740225	2001 WJ_{106}	—	December 24, 2013	Mount Lemmon	Mount Lemmon Survey	·	1.0 km	MPC · JPL
740226	2001 WO_{106}	—	November 23, 2014	Haleakala	Pan-STARRS 1	HNS	880 m	MPC · JPL
740227	2001 XA_{135}	—	December 14, 2001	Socorro	LINEAR	·	2.0 km	MPC · JPL
740228	2001 XB_{135}	—	December 14, 2001	Socorro	LINEAR	·	2.3 km	MPC · JPL
740229	2001 XQ_{268}	—	March 10, 2003	Palomar	NEAT	T_{j} (2.9)	3.1 km	MPC · JPL
740230	2001 YX_{31}	—	December 18, 2001	Socorro	LINEAR	·	500 m	MPC · JPL
740231	2001 YQ_{55}	—	December 18, 2001	Socorro	LINEAR	·	1.8 km	MPC · JPL
740232	2001 YG_{76}	—	December 18, 2001	Socorro	LINEAR	·	1.3 km	MPC · JPL
740233	2001 YV_{163}	—	August 12, 2012	Catalina	CSS	·	1.1 km	MPC · JPL
740234	2001 YZ_{163}	—	December 23, 2001	Kitt Peak	Spacewatch	·	680 m	MPC · JPL
740235	2001 YB_{164}	—	August 19, 2014	Haleakala	Pan-STARRS 1	·	1.8 km	MPC · JPL
740236	2001 YO_{164}	—	July 7, 2016	Mount Lemmon	Mount Lemmon Survey	·	3.2 km	MPC · JPL
740237	2002 AN_{8}	—	January 6, 2002	Kitt Peak	Spacewatch	·	1.1 km	MPC · JPL
740238	2002 AT_{18}	—	December 19, 2001	Socorro	LINEAR	H	450 m	MPC · JPL
740239	2002 AO_{43}	—	January 8, 2002	Palomar	NEAT	PHO	890 m	MPC · JPL
740240	2002 AE_{138}	—	January 9, 2002	Socorro	LINEAR	·	700 m	MPC · JPL
740241	2002 AB_{195}	—	January 13, 2002	Kitt Peak	Spacewatch	(5)	890 m	MPC · JPL
740242	2002 AU_{212}	—	December 12, 2006	Mount Lemmon	Mount Lemmon Survey	·	1.4 km	MPC · JPL
740243	2002 AR_{213}	—	August 28, 2014	Haleakala	Pan-STARRS 1	GEF	1.2 km	MPC · JPL
740244	2002 AU_{213}	—	April 25, 2015	Haleakala	Pan-STARRS 1	·	970 m	MPC · JPL
740245	2002 AH_{215}	—	February 8, 2014	Mount Lemmon	Mount Lemmon Survey	·	1.1 km	MPC · JPL
740246	2002 BN_{33}	—	April 29, 2015	Kitt Peak	Spacewatch	·	1.1 km	MPC · JPL
740247	2002 CF_{153}	—	February 7, 2002	Kitt Peak	Spacewatch	·	1.1 km	MPC · JPL
740248	2002 CO_{235}	—	January 12, 2002	Palomar	NEAT	·	1.7 km	MPC · JPL
740249	2002 CB_{320}	—	December 31, 2008	Mount Lemmon	Mount Lemmon Survey	PHO	730 m	MPC · JPL
740250	2002 CF_{321}	—	January 19, 2012	Haleakala	Pan-STARRS 1	PHO	810 m	MPC · JPL
740251	2002 CK_{321}	—	October 9, 2012	Haleakala	Pan-STARRS 1	·	670 m	MPC · JPL
740252	2002 CG_{324}	—	February 21, 2017	Haleakala	Pan-STARRS 1	·	1.1 km	MPC · JPL
740253	2002 CH_{324}	—	April 23, 2015	Haleakala	Pan-STARRS 1	·	990 m	MPC · JPL
740254	2002 CK_{324}	—	April 9, 2010	Kitt Peak	Spacewatch	·	1.2 km	MPC · JPL
740255	2002 DU_{6}	—	February 20, 2002	Kitt Peak	Spacewatch	·	1.0 km	MPC · JPL
740256	2002 EA_{133}	—	February 13, 2002	Kitt Peak	Spacewatch	·	1.5 km	MPC · JPL
740257	2002 EX_{167}	—	August 29, 2009	Kitt Peak	Spacewatch	GEF	930 m	MPC · JPL
740258	2002 EM_{168}	—	November 14, 2012	Kitt Peak	Spacewatch	·	840 m	MPC · JPL
740259	2002 EX_{171}	—	February 16, 2010	Kitt Peak	Spacewatch	EUN	770 m	MPC · JPL
740260	2002 FV_{12}	—	March 16, 2002	Socorro	LINEAR	H	420 m	MPC · JPL
740261	2002 FL_{42}	—	August 4, 2003	Kitt Peak	Spacewatch	RAF	580 m	MPC · JPL
740262	2002 FD_{43}	—	March 21, 2002	Kitt Peak	Spacewatch	·	790 m	MPC · JPL
740263	2002 FU_{43}	—	April 25, 2015	Haleakala	Pan-STARRS 1	·	800 m	MPC · JPL
740264	2002 GR_{55}	—	April 5, 2002	Palomar	NEAT	·	680 m	MPC · JPL
740265	2002 GG_{189}	—	April 8, 2002	Palomar	NEAT	·	630 m	MPC · JPL
740266	2002 GJ_{189}	—	April 8, 2002	Palomar	NEAT	·	690 m	MPC · JPL
740267	2002 GF_{196}	—	November 7, 2012	Mount Lemmon	Mount Lemmon Survey	·	1.2 km	MPC · JPL
740268	2002 GO_{196}	—	April 9, 2002	Palomar	NEAT	·	1.0 km	MPC · JPL
740269	2002 HO_{18}	—	April 20, 2002	Palomar	NEAT	H	490 m	MPC · JPL
740270	2002 JL_{68}	—	April 22, 2002	Palomar	NEAT	H	650 m	MPC · JPL
740271	2002 JV_{152}	—	September 20, 2009	Kitt Peak	Spacewatch	·	2.5 km	MPC · JPL
740272	2002 KW_{17}	—	May 30, 2002	Palomar	NEAT	BAR	1.0 km	MPC · JPL
740273	2002 LS_{5}	—	May 19, 2002	Palomar	NEAT	·	610 m	MPC · JPL
740274	2002 LB_{39}	—	June 9, 2002	Socorro	LINEAR	·	660 m	MPC · JPL
740275	2002 LZ_{65}	—	July 1, 2013	Haleakala	Pan-STARRS 1	·	2.0 km	MPC · JPL
740276	2002 MY_{6}	—	June 16, 2002	Palomar	NEAT	·	2.0 km	MPC · JPL
740277	2002 NB_{22}	—	July 4, 2002	Palomar	NEAT	(194)	1.7 km	MPC · JPL
740278	2002 NL_{69}	—	July 6, 2002	Palomar	NEAT	·	2.5 km	MPC · JPL
740279	2002 NX_{75}	—	July 12, 2002	Palomar	NEAT	·	1.4 km	MPC · JPL
740280	2002 NG_{76}	—	July 12, 2002	Palomar	NEAT	·	580 m	MPC · JPL
740281	2002 NC_{79}	—	July 12, 2002	Palomar	NEAT	·	570 m	MPC · JPL
740282	2002 NL_{80}	—	July 4, 2002	Palomar	NEAT	·	580 m	MPC · JPL
740283	2002 NE_{82}	—	November 7, 2007	Mount Lemmon	Mount Lemmon Survey	·	1.5 km	MPC · JPL
740284	2002 OB_{20}	—	July 23, 2002	Palomar	NEAT	·	2.9 km	MPC · JPL
740285	2002 OS_{32}	—	July 18, 2002	Palomar	NEAT	·	1.1 km	MPC · JPL
740286	2002 OO_{36}	—	August 10, 2010	Kitt Peak	Spacewatch	·	1.6 km	MPC · JPL
740287	2002 PX_{6}	—	August 5, 2002	Palomar	NEAT	PHO	640 m	MPC · JPL
740288	2002 PS_{7}	—	July 12, 2002	Palomar	NEAT	·	730 m	MPC · JPL
740289	2002 PF_{8}	—	August 4, 2002	Palomar	NEAT	H	440 m	MPC · JPL
740290	2002 PZ_{16}	—	August 6, 2002	Palomar	NEAT	·	1.0 km	MPC · JPL
740291	2002 PF_{23}	—	August 6, 2002	Palomar	NEAT	ERI	1.0 km	MPC · JPL
740292	2002 PV_{36}	—	August 7, 2002	Palomar	NEAT	·	1.5 km	MPC · JPL
740293	2002 PE_{65}	—	July 22, 2002	Palomar	NEAT	·	1.5 km	MPC · JPL
740294	2002 PX_{68}	—	August 12, 2002	Socorro	LINEAR	·	1.4 km	MPC · JPL
740295	2002 PH_{81}	—	August 4, 2002	Palomar	NEAT	·	1.7 km	MPC · JPL
740296	2002 PC_{95}	—	July 14, 2002	Palomar	NEAT	·	1.0 km	MPC · JPL
740297	2002 PR_{102}	—	July 12, 2002	Palomar	NEAT	TIR	2.9 km	MPC · JPL
740298	2002 PZ_{120}	—	August 12, 2002	Socorro	LINEAR	·	750 m	MPC · JPL
740299	2002 PB_{131}	—	August 6, 2002	Palomar	NEAT	·	1.1 km	MPC · JPL
740300	2002 PK_{141}	—	August 14, 2002	Palomar	NEAT	·	2.1 km	MPC · JPL

== 740301–740400 ==
back to top

Designation			Discovery			Properties		Ref
Permanent	Provisional	Named after	Date	Site	Discoverer(s)	Category	Diam.	Ref
740301	2002 PH_{163}	—	July 22, 2002	Palomar	NEAT	JUN	760 m	MPC · JPL
740302	2002 PH_{170}	—	August 3, 2002	Palomar	NEAT	·	1.3 km	MPC · JPL
740303	2002 PX_{180}	—	August 15, 2002	Palomar	NEAT	·	690 m	MPC · JPL
740304	2002 PC_{184}	—	August 6, 2002	Palomar	NEAT	·	1.1 km	MPC · JPL
740305	2002 PT_{184}	—	August 7, 2002	Palomar	NEAT	·	1.1 km	MPC · JPL
740306	2002 PJ_{190}	—	August 11, 2002	Palomar	NEAT	·	890 m	MPC · JPL
740307	2002 PQ_{193}	—	October 30, 2002	Apache Point	SDSS	LIX	2.9 km	MPC · JPL
740308	2002 PO_{196}	—	April 24, 2006	Kitt Peak	Spacewatch	·	1.1 km	MPC · JPL
740309	2002 PK_{200}	—	October 28, 2008	Kitt Peak	Spacewatch	·	1.8 km	MPC · JPL
740310	2002 PN_{201}	—	February 2, 2008	Kitt Peak	Spacewatch	·	760 m	MPC · JPL
740311	2002 PL_{204}	—	November 18, 2007	Kitt Peak	Spacewatch	·	1.2 km	MPC · JPL
740312	2002 PC_{206}	—	August 14, 2002	Palomar	NEAT	·	1.3 km	MPC · JPL
740313	2002 QX_{3}	—	August 16, 2002	Palomar	NEAT	·	930 m	MPC · JPL
740314	2002 QJ_{17}	—	August 27, 2002	Palomar	NEAT	MAR	1.0 km	MPC · JPL
740315	2002 QN_{32}	—	August 29, 2002	Palomar	NEAT	·	970 m	MPC · JPL
740316	2002 QG_{54}	—	August 17, 2002	Palomar	NEAT	·	560 m	MPC · JPL
740317	2002 QD_{63}	—	August 27, 2002	Palomar	NEAT	NYS	680 m	MPC · JPL
740318	2002 QG_{78}	—	August 19, 2002	Palomar	NEAT	·	2.3 km	MPC · JPL
740319	2002 QU_{87}	—	August 27, 2002	Palomar	NEAT	·	1.5 km	MPC · JPL
740320	2002 QK_{98}	—	August 18, 2002	Palomar	NEAT	·	930 m	MPC · JPL
740321	2002 QV_{99}	—	August 18, 2002	Palomar	NEAT	EOS	1.6 km	MPC · JPL
740322	2002 QY_{110}	—	August 17, 2002	Palomar	NEAT	·	620 m	MPC · JPL
740323	2002 QL_{116}	—	August 29, 2002	Palomar	NEAT	·	2.6 km	MPC · JPL
740324	2002 QW_{120}	—	August 30, 2002	Palomar	NEAT	·	880 m	MPC · JPL
740325	2002 QO_{121}	—	August 16, 2002	Palomar	NEAT	·	2.4 km	MPC · JPL
740326	2002 QS_{130}	—	August 30, 2002	Palomar	NEAT	·	1.4 km	MPC · JPL
740327	2002 QA_{136}	—	August 13, 2002	Palomar Mountain	NEAT	·	1.5 km	MPC · JPL
740328	2002 QY_{136}	—	August 28, 2002	Palomar	NEAT	·	550 m	MPC · JPL
740329	2002 QS_{137}	—	August 29, 2002	Palomar	NEAT	·	1.3 km	MPC · JPL
740330	2002 QA_{142}	—	January 10, 2008	Mount Lemmon	Mount Lemmon Survey	·	910 m	MPC · JPL
740331	2002 QA_{143}	—	February 20, 2009	Mount Lemmon	Mount Lemmon Survey	·	1.9 km	MPC · JPL
740332	2002 QY_{144}	—	April 8, 2002	Cerro Tololo	Deep Ecliptic Survey	·	1.8 km	MPC · JPL
740333	2002 QJ_{145}	—	August 19, 2002	Palomar	NEAT	LIX	2.8 km	MPC · JPL
740334	2002 QT_{145}	—	August 4, 2002	Palomar	NEAT	·	1.5 km	MPC · JPL
740335	2002 QD_{146}	—	August 12, 2002	Cerro Tololo	Deep Ecliptic Survey	·	580 m	MPC · JPL
740336	2002 QB_{147}	—	August 18, 2002	Palomar	NEAT	·	1.8 km	MPC · JPL
740337	2002 QF_{152}	—	August 28, 2002	Palomar	NEAT	EUN	830 m	MPC · JPL
740338	2002 QQ_{153}	—	October 21, 2008	Kitt Peak	Spacewatch	·	2.3 km	MPC · JPL
740339	2002 QU_{153}	—	October 23, 2011	Mount Lemmon	Mount Lemmon Survey	·	1.4 km	MPC · JPL
740340	2002 QX_{153}	—	August 27, 2002	Palomar	NEAT	NYS	740 m	MPC · JPL
740341	2002 QL_{154}	—	August 17, 2002	Palomar	NEAT	·	950 m	MPC · JPL
740342	2002 QM_{155}	—	October 2, 2006	Mount Lemmon	Mount Lemmon Survey	·	930 m	MPC · JPL
740343	2002 QW_{155}	—	September 15, 2013	Mount Lemmon	Mount Lemmon Survey	EOS	1.6 km	MPC · JPL
740344	2002 QC_{156}	—	March 5, 2014	Kitt Peak	Spacewatch	·	1.4 km	MPC · JPL
740345	2002 QM_{156}	—	August 3, 2002	Palomar	NEAT	JUN	740 m	MPC · JPL
740346	2002 QN_{156}	—	August 28, 2013	Catalina	CSS	·	2.6 km	MPC · JPL
740347	2002 QZ_{156}	—	August 24, 2006	Palomar	NEAT	HNS	1.3 km	MPC · JPL
740348	2002 QB_{158}	—	August 19, 2002	Palomar	NEAT	·	1.9 km	MPC · JPL
740349	2002 QG_{159}	—	July 13, 2016	Mount Lemmon	Mount Lemmon Survey	V	450 m	MPC · JPL
740350	2002 QW_{159}	—	May 18, 2017	Haleakala	Pan-STARRS 1	·	2.0 km	MPC · JPL
740351	2002 RN_{4}	—	September 3, 2002	Palomar	NEAT	·	1.9 km	MPC · JPL
740352	2002 RX_{137}	—	September 13, 2002	Palomar	NEAT	EUN	940 m	MPC · JPL
740353	2002 RX_{150}	—	September 12, 2002	Palomar	NEAT	TIR	2.3 km	MPC · JPL
740354	2002 RK_{161}	—	September 12, 2002	Palomar	NEAT	·	950 m	MPC · JPL
740355	2002 RF_{178}	—	September 13, 2002	Palomar	NEAT	·	710 m	MPC · JPL
740356	2002 RZ_{178}	—	September 14, 2002	Kitt Peak	Spacewatch	EOS	1.7 km	MPC · JPL
740357	2002 RB_{199}	—	September 11, 2002	Haleakala	NEAT	·	790 m	MPC · JPL
740358	2002 RB_{215}	—	September 13, 2002	Socorro	LINEAR	·	580 m	MPC · JPL
740359	2002 RR_{234}	—	September 14, 2002	Palomar	R. Matson	MAR	960 m	MPC · JPL
740360	2002 RS_{246}	—	September 14, 2002	Palomar	NEAT	·	590 m	MPC · JPL
740361	2002 RS_{268}	—	September 4, 2002	Palomar	NEAT	·	1.3 km	MPC · JPL
740362	2002 RO_{272}	—	September 4, 2002	Palomar	NEAT	H	400 m	MPC · JPL
740363	2002 RQ_{275}	—	September 14, 2002	Palomar	NEAT	·	1.2 km	MPC · JPL
740364	2002 RQ_{280}	—	September 9, 2002	Palomar	NEAT	PHO	570 m	MPC · JPL
740365	2002 RQ_{283}	—	September 4, 2002	Palomar	NEAT	EUP	2.7 km	MPC · JPL
740366	2002 RC_{286}	—	December 6, 2007	Kitt Peak	Spacewatch	·	1.5 km	MPC · JPL
740367	2002 RW_{286}	—	September 11, 2002	Palomar	NEAT	·	1.1 km	MPC · JPL
740368	2002 RY_{286}	—	December 5, 2007	Kitt Peak	Spacewatch	·	1.2 km	MPC · JPL
740369	2002 RA_{287}	—	September 11, 2002	Palomar	NEAT	·	2.8 km	MPC · JPL
740370	2002 RJ_{293}	—	September 4, 2011	Haleakala	Pan-STARRS 1	·	1.5 km	MPC · JPL
740371	2002 RK_{293}	—	September 4, 2002	Palomar	NEAT	·	2.4 km	MPC · JPL
740372	2002 RS_{294}	—	September 8, 2002	Campo Imperatore	CINEOS	·	650 m	MPC · JPL
740373	2002 RC_{295}	—	September 12, 2002	Haleakala	NEAT	T_{j} (2.94)	3.1 km	MPC · JPL
740374	2002 RF_{295}	—	May 7, 2014	Haleakala	Pan-STARRS 1	·	2.7 km	MPC · JPL
740375	2002 RN_{295}	—	September 3, 2002	Palomar	NEAT	ADE	1.5 km	MPC · JPL
740376	2002 RR_{299}	—	September 3, 2002	Palomar	NEAT	·	2.5 km	MPC · JPL
740377	2002 RL_{301}	—	January 16, 2015	Haleakala	Pan-STARRS 1	·	1.6 km	MPC · JPL
740378	2002 SE_{2}	—	September 26, 2002	Palomar	NEAT	·	800 m	MPC · JPL
740379	2002 SA_{4}	—	September 26, 2002	Palomar	NEAT	THM	2.4 km	MPC · JPL
740380	2002 SW_{44}	—	September 29, 2002	Haleakala	NEAT	BRU	2.1 km	MPC · JPL
740381	2002 SN_{65}	—	September 16, 2002	Palomar	NEAT	·	2.1 km	MPC · JPL
740382	2002 SC_{68}	—	October 11, 2002	Kitt Peak	Spacewatch	·	1.3 km	MPC · JPL
740383	2002 TO_{61}	—	October 3, 2002	Campo Imperatore	CINEOS	·	2.8 km	MPC · JPL
740384	2002 TV_{64}	—	October 4, 2002	Socorro	LINEAR	·	940 m	MPC · JPL
740385	2002 TM_{73}	—	October 3, 2002	Palomar	NEAT	·	1.5 km	MPC · JPL
740386	2002 TW_{96}	—	October 1, 2002	Anderson Mesa	LONEOS	·	570 m	MPC · JPL
740387	2002 TV_{103}	—	October 4, 2002	Socorro	LINEAR	·	1.8 km	MPC · JPL
740388	2002 TX_{103}	—	October 4, 2002	Socorro	LINEAR	·	2.2 km	MPC · JPL
740389	2002 TT_{126}	—	October 4, 2002	Socorro	LINEAR	·	1.1 km	MPC · JPL
740390	2002 TD_{145}	—	October 3, 2002	Palomar	NEAT	·	1.3 km	MPC · JPL
740391	2002 TR_{145}	—	October 3, 2002	Campo Imperatore	CINEOS	·	2.7 km	MPC · JPL
740392	2002 TB_{154}	—	October 5, 2002	Palomar	NEAT	·	950 m	MPC · JPL
740393	2002 TW_{160}	—	October 5, 2002	Palomar	NEAT	·	3.0 km	MPC · JPL
740394	2002 TW_{193}	—	October 3, 2002	Socorro	LINEAR	·	1.4 km	MPC · JPL
740395	2002 TE_{201}	—	October 5, 2002	Kitt Peak	Spacewatch	THM	2.0 km	MPC · JPL
740396	2002 TT_{220}	—	September 11, 2002	Palomar	NEAT	(1547)	1.4 km	MPC · JPL
740397	2002 TV_{249}	—	October 3, 2002	Socorro	LINEAR	NYS	930 m	MPC · JPL
740398	2002 TS_{263}	—	October 4, 2002	Socorro	LINEAR	(1547)	1.3 km	MPC · JPL
740399	2002 TG_{291}	—	October 4, 2002	Anderson Mesa	LONEOS	·	640 m	MPC · JPL
740400	2002 TU_{374}	—	September 23, 2009	Kitt Peak	Spacewatch	·	750 m	MPC · JPL

== 740401–740500 ==
back to top

Designation			Discovery			Properties		Ref
Permanent	Provisional	Named after	Date	Site	Discoverer(s)	Category	Diam.	Ref
740401	2002 TO_{376}	—	October 10, 2002	Palomar	NEAT	·	3.0 km	MPC · JPL
740402	2002 TU_{378}	—	October 5, 2002	Palomar	NEAT	·	2.1 km	MPC · JPL
740403	2002 TY_{380}	—	October 9, 2002	Palomar	NEAT	·	2.6 km	MPC · JPL
740404	2002 TD_{388}	—	October 8, 2013	Mount Lemmon	Mount Lemmon Survey	EOS	1.4 km	MPC · JPL
740405	2002 TB_{391}	—	November 27, 2013	Haleakala	Pan-STARRS 1	·	840 m	MPC · JPL
740406	2002 TN_{391}	—	November 2, 2013	Kitt Peak	Spacewatch	·	810 m	MPC · JPL
740407	2002 TR_{393}	—	March 2, 2009	Kitt Peak	Spacewatch	(17392)	1.1 km	MPC · JPL
740408	2002 UL_{1}	—	October 28, 2002	Kitt Peak	Spacewatch	JUN	660 m	MPC · JPL
740409	2002 UP_{1}	—	October 15, 2002	Palomar	NEAT	·	1.3 km	MPC · JPL
740410	2002 UQ_{25}	—	October 30, 2002	Haleakala	NEAT	·	2.7 km	MPC · JPL
740411	2002 UH_{73}	—	October 31, 2002	Palomar	NEAT	·	1.5 km	MPC · JPL
740412	2002 UT_{73}	—	October 29, 2002	Palomar	NEAT	·	2.0 km	MPC · JPL
740413	2002 UF_{77}	—	October 18, 2002	Palomar	NEAT	MAS	620 m	MPC · JPL
740414	2002 UL_{78}	—	October 29, 2002	Palomar	NEAT	NYS	720 m	MPC · JPL
740415	2002 UV_{80}	—	September 1, 2013	Haleakala	Pan-STARRS 1	·	790 m	MPC · JPL
740416	2002 VN_{11}	—	November 1, 2002	Palomar	NEAT	·	1.7 km	MPC · JPL
740417	2002 VD_{25}	—	October 16, 2002	Palomar	NEAT	·	920 m	MPC · JPL
740418	2002 VK_{25}	—	November 5, 2002	Kitt Peak	Spacewatch	·	1.8 km	MPC · JPL
740419	2002 VF_{37}	—	November 4, 2002	Palomar	NEAT	·	3.0 km	MPC · JPL
740420	2002 VQ_{65}	—	October 2, 2002	Socorro	LINEAR	PHO	850 m	MPC · JPL
740421	2002 VT_{75}	—	November 7, 2002	Socorro	LINEAR	JUN	820 m	MPC · JPL
740422	2002 VE_{92}	—	November 12, 2002	Wrightwood	J. W. Young	·	2.4 km	MPC · JPL
740423	2002 VT_{98}	—	November 13, 2002	Kitt Peak	Spacewatch	EUN	1.1 km	MPC · JPL
740424	2002 VB_{99}	—	September 27, 2002	Socorro	LINEAR	·	2.8 km	MPC · JPL
740425	2002 VR_{107}	—	November 12, 2002	Socorro	LINEAR	·	2.8 km	MPC · JPL
740426	2002 VU_{125}	—	November 14, 2002	Palomar	NEAT	H	410 m	MPC · JPL
740427	2002 VE_{137}	—	November 14, 2002	Kitt Peak	Spacewatch	·	2.7 km	MPC · JPL
740428	2002 VM_{144}	—	November 4, 2002	Palomar	NEAT	NYS	930 m	MPC · JPL
740429	2002 VZ_{146}	—	November 4, 2002	Palomar	NEAT	THB	2.4 km	MPC · JPL
740430	2002 VP_{147}	—	December 3, 2002	Palomar	NEAT	·	2.6 km	MPC · JPL
740431	2002 VR_{147}	—	November 4, 2002	Palomar	NEAT	·	1.2 km	MPC · JPL
740432	2002 VH_{149}	—	September 16, 2013	Catalina	CSS	·	2.7 km	MPC · JPL
740433	2002 VE_{150}	—	February 25, 2011	Kitt Peak	Spacewatch	·	940 m	MPC · JPL
740434	2002 VT_{153}	—	October 5, 2013	Haleakala	Pan-STARRS 1	EOS	1.5 km	MPC · JPL
740435	2002 VK_{154}	—	July 5, 2016	Haleakala	Pan-STARRS 1	·	880 m	MPC · JPL
740436	2002 WO_{6}	—	November 24, 2002	Palomar	NEAT	T_{j} (2.96)	2.9 km	MPC · JPL
740437	2002 WM_{26}	—	November 24, 2002	Palomar	NEAT	·	1.2 km	MPC · JPL
740438	2002 WT_{28}	—	October 31, 2002	Palomar	NEAT	·	1.4 km	MPC · JPL
740439	2002 XA_{9}	—	November 7, 2002	Socorro	LINEAR	·	1.5 km	MPC · JPL
740440	2002 XU_{20}	—	December 2, 2002	Socorro	LINEAR	JUN	910 m	MPC · JPL
740441	2002 XG_{120}	—	December 3, 2002	Palomar	NEAT	·	3.4 km	MPC · JPL
740442	2002 XO_{122}	—	October 14, 2013	Kitt Peak	Spacewatch	·	800 m	MPC · JPL
740443	2002 XW_{122}	—	July 10, 2005	Siding Spring	SSS	·	870 m	MPC · JPL
740444	2003 AP_{37}	—	November 14, 2002	Socorro	LINEAR	·	1.3 km	MPC · JPL
740445	2003 AZ_{94}	—	January 21, 2012	Haleakala	Pan-STARRS 1	JUN	930 m	MPC · JPL
740446	2003 BB_{3}	—	January 8, 2003	Socorro	LINEAR	H	460 m	MPC · JPL
740447	2003 BW_{5}	—	January 26, 2003	Anderson Mesa	LONEOS	·	2.1 km	MPC · JPL
740448	2003 BZ_{75}	—	January 29, 2003	Palomar	NEAT	·	960 m	MPC · JPL
740449	2003 BN_{97}	—	December 4, 2015	Haleakala	Pan-STARRS 1	L5	9.5 km	MPC · JPL
740450	2003 BP_{97}	—	October 17, 2006	Mount Lemmon	Mount Lemmon Survey	·	1.1 km	MPC · JPL
740451	2003 BM_{98}	—	February 26, 2014	Haleakala	Pan-STARRS 1	NYS	890 m	MPC · JPL
740452	2003 BR_{98}	—	July 28, 2011	Haleakala	Pan-STARRS 1	·	470 m	MPC · JPL
740453	2003 BX_{98}	—	January 18, 2015	Haleakala	Pan-STARRS 1	·	3.2 km	MPC · JPL
740454	2003 BH_{99}	—	January 20, 2012	Haleakala	Pan-STARRS 1	EUN	1.2 km	MPC · JPL
740455	2003 BK_{99}	—	January 28, 2015	Haleakala	Pan-STARRS 1	·	2.8 km	MPC · JPL
740456	2003 BW_{102}	—	December 31, 2013	Kitt Peak	Spacewatch	·	2.6 km	MPC · JPL
740457	2003 BX_{102}	—	December 31, 2013	Mount Lemmon	Mount Lemmon Survey	·	2.5 km	MPC · JPL
740458	2003 CS_{27}	—	February 1, 2003	Palomar	NEAT	·	1.3 km	MPC · JPL
740459	2003 EX_{13}	—	March 6, 2003	Palomar	NEAT	T_{j} (2.92)	2.3 km	MPC · JPL
740460	2003 ED_{65}	—	March 4, 2017	Haleakala	Pan-STARRS 1	·	1.6 km	MPC · JPL
740461	2003 FU_{120}	—	February 1, 2003	Kitt Peak	Spacewatch	·	1.8 km	MPC · JPL
740462	2003 FS_{135}	—	December 25, 2013	Mount Lemmon	Mount Lemmon Survey	·	1.1 km	MPC · JPL
740463	2003 FV_{135}	—	April 8, 2003	Kitt Peak	Spacewatch	·	500 m	MPC · JPL
740464	2003 FH_{136}	—	January 26, 2014	Haleakala	Pan-STARRS 1	·	3.1 km	MPC · JPL
740465	2003 FE_{137}	—	February 15, 2013	Haleakala	Pan-STARRS 1	·	590 m	MPC · JPL
740466	2003 FL_{141}	—	March 24, 2003	Kitt Peak	Spacewatch	T_{j} (2.99)	2.7 km	MPC · JPL
740467	2003 GL_{58}	—	April 9, 2003	Kitt Peak	Spacewatch	·	600 m	MPC · JPL
740468	2003 GG_{59}	—	September 19, 2010	Kitt Peak	Spacewatch	DOR	2.1 km	MPC · JPL
740469	2003 GJ_{60}	—	April 1, 2003	Apache Point	SDSS	·	2.1 km	MPC · JPL
740470	2003 GL_{60}	—	April 5, 2003	Kitt Peak	Spacewatch	MAS	590 m	MPC · JPL
740471	2003 GO_{60}	—	April 30, 2011	Mount Lemmon	Mount Lemmon Survey	MAS	690 m	MPC · JPL
740472	2003 GR_{60}	—	October 26, 2011	Haleakala	Pan-STARRS 1	·	620 m	MPC · JPL
740473	2003 GS_{62}	—	May 22, 2017	Haleakala	Pan-STARRS 1	·	1.6 km	MPC · JPL
740474	2003 GB_{64}	—	April 11, 2003	Kitt Peak	Spacewatch	·	490 m	MPC · JPL
740475	2003 GE_{64}	—	October 6, 2008	Mount Lemmon	Mount Lemmon Survey	·	1.0 km	MPC · JPL
740476	2003 GU_{65}	—	April 1, 2003	Kitt Peak	Deep Ecliptic Survey	·	960 m	MPC · JPL
740477	2003 HU_{53}	—	April 5, 2003	Kitt Peak	Spacewatch	·	1.5 km	MPC · JPL
740478	2003 HU_{59}	—	February 28, 2014	Haleakala	Pan-STARRS 1	·	1.1 km	MPC · JPL
740479	2003 HJ_{60}	—	March 13, 2012	Mount Lemmon	Mount Lemmon Survey	·	1.7 km	MPC · JPL
740480	2003 HB_{61}	—	October 21, 2006	Kitt Peak	Spacewatch	·	2.7 km	MPC · JPL
740481	2003 HD_{63}	—	March 7, 2016	Haleakala	Pan-STARRS 1	·	620 m	MPC · JPL
740482	2003 HE_{64}	—	April 25, 2003	Kitt Peak	Spacewatch	·	470 m	MPC · JPL
740483	2003 JH_{19}	—	April 1, 2015	Kitt Peak	Spacewatch	·	790 m	MPC · JPL
740484	2003 KO_{37}	—	May 26, 2008	Kitt Peak	Spacewatch	·	2.0 km	MPC · JPL
740485	2003 KM_{39}	—	August 2, 2011	Haleakala	Pan-STARRS 1	H	390 m	MPC · JPL
740486	2003 KN_{39}	—	January 29, 2017	Haleakala	Pan-STARRS 1	·	1.1 km	MPC · JPL
740487	2003 KR_{39}	—	July 12, 2015	Haleakala	Pan-STARRS 1	·	890 m	MPC · JPL
740488	2003 NQ_{10}	—	July 3, 2003	Kitt Peak	Spacewatch	H	450 m	MPC · JPL
740489	2003 OT_{35}	—	July 25, 2003	Palomar	NEAT	·	560 m	MPC · JPL
740490	2003 PN_{10}	—	August 5, 2003	Kitt Peak	Spacewatch	·	810 m	MPC · JPL
740491	2003 QM_{3}	—	August 19, 2003	Campo Imperatore	CINEOS	·	1.7 km	MPC · JPL
740492	2003 QR_{14}	—	August 20, 2003	Palomar	NEAT	·	1 km	MPC · JPL
740493	2003 QM_{69}	—	August 26, 2003	Socorro	LINEAR	(5)	1.1 km	MPC · JPL
740494	2003 QL_{92}	—	February 10, 2002	Socorro	LINEAR	·	2.5 km	MPC · JPL
740495 Langill	2003 QF_{116}	Langill	August 21, 2003	Mauna Kea	D. D. Balam, K. Perrett	·	590 m	MPC · JPL
740496	2003 QH_{122}	—	August 26, 2003	Cerro Tololo	Deep Ecliptic Survey	·	1.2 km	MPC · JPL
740497	2003 QQ_{122}	—	October 7, 2016	Haleakala	Pan-STARRS 1	·	1.4 km	MPC · JPL
740498	2003 QF_{123}	—	October 13, 2007	Mount Lemmon	Mount Lemmon Survey	·	950 m	MPC · JPL
740499	2003 QF_{125}	—	August 23, 2003	Palomar	NEAT	MAR	920 m	MPC · JPL
740500	2003 QG_{126}	—	September 4, 2008	Kitt Peak	Spacewatch	·	1.3 km	MPC · JPL

== 740501–740600 ==
back to top

Designation			Discovery			Properties		Ref
Permanent	Provisional	Named after	Date	Site	Discoverer(s)	Category	Diam.	Ref
740501	2003 RZ_{5}	—	September 4, 2003	Haleakala	NEAT	·	1.7 km	MPC · JPL
740502	2003 SF_{2}	—	September 16, 2003	Kitt Peak	Spacewatch	·	2.0 km	MPC · JPL
740503	2003 SY_{6}	—	September 16, 2003	Kitt Peak	Spacewatch	·	2.6 km	MPC · JPL
740504	2003 ST_{28}	—	September 18, 2003	Palomar	NEAT	·	1.8 km	MPC · JPL
740505	2003 SX_{34}	—	September 18, 2003	Kitt Peak	Spacewatch	·	580 m	MPC · JPL
740506	2003 SV_{41}	—	August 31, 2003	Haleakala	NEAT	·	1.2 km	MPC · JPL
740507	2003 ST_{48}	—	September 18, 2003	Palomar	NEAT	·	1.2 km	MPC · JPL
740508	2003 SB_{62}	—	August 29, 2003	Haleakala	NEAT	·	1.5 km	MPC · JPL
740509	2003 SC_{104}	—	September 17, 2003	Anderson Mesa	LONEOS	T_{j} (2.93)	3.9 km	MPC · JPL
740510	2003 SR_{121}	—	September 17, 2003	Kitt Peak	Spacewatch	T_{j} (2.93)	3.9 km	MPC · JPL
740511	2003 SX_{122}	—	September 18, 2003	Palomar	NEAT	·	2.1 km	MPC · JPL
740512	2003 SO_{153}	—	September 20, 2003	Palomar	NEAT	·	1.2 km	MPC · JPL
740513	2003 SO_{175}	—	September 18, 2003	Kitt Peak	Spacewatch	EUN	1.0 km	MPC · JPL
740514	2003 SN_{184}	—	September 21, 2003	Kitt Peak	Spacewatch	·	1.0 km	MPC · JPL
740515	2003 SJ_{187}	—	September 17, 2003	Kitt Peak	Spacewatch	·	790 m	MPC · JPL
740516	2003 SL_{223}	—	September 29, 2003	Desert Eagle	W. K. Y. Yeung	·	1.3 km	MPC · JPL
740517	2003 SV_{240}	—	September 27, 2003	Kitt Peak	Spacewatch	·	3.0 km	MPC · JPL
740518	2003 SO_{242}	—	September 27, 2003	Kitt Peak	Spacewatch	·	970 m	MPC · JPL
740519	2003 SM_{254}	—	September 27, 2003	Kitt Peak	Spacewatch	·	1.9 km	MPC · JPL
740520	2003 SO_{261}	—	September 27, 2003	Socorro	LINEAR	·	1.2 km	MPC · JPL
740521	2003 SL_{290}	—	September 6, 2003	Siding Spring	R. H. McNaught, G. J. Garradd	·	1.6 km	MPC · JPL
740522	2003 SW_{309}	—	September 18, 2003	Goodricke-Pigott	R. A. Tucker	·	2.6 km	MPC · JPL
740523	2003 SM_{310}	—	September 28, 2003	Socorro	LINEAR	·	1.1 km	MPC · JPL
740524	2003 SJ_{315}	—	September 25, 2003	Palomar	NEAT	·	1.2 km	MPC · JPL
740525	2003 SS_{327}	—	September 19, 2003	Palomar	NEAT	BRG	1.2 km	MPC · JPL
740526	2003 SJ_{328}	—	September 20, 2003	Kitt Peak	Spacewatch	·	920 m	MPC · JPL
740527	2003 SZ_{330}	—	October 20, 2003	Kitt Peak	Spacewatch	·	2.1 km	MPC · JPL
740528	2003 SA_{332}	—	October 20, 2003	Kitt Peak	Spacewatch	·	2.0 km	MPC · JPL
740529	2003 SV_{334}	—	September 28, 2003	Socorro	LINEAR	·	740 m	MPC · JPL
740530	2003 SZ_{334}	—	September 30, 2003	Kitt Peak	Spacewatch	·	2.3 km	MPC · JPL
740531	2003 SR_{336}	—	October 20, 2003	Kitt Peak	Spacewatch	·	1.2 km	MPC · JPL
740532	2003 SU_{339}	—	September 26, 2003	Apache Point	SDSS	·	1.3 km	MPC · JPL
740533	2003 SZ_{340}	—	September 16, 2003	Kitt Peak	Spacewatch	·	1.4 km	MPC · JPL
740534	2003 SR_{341}	—	September 17, 2003	Kitt Peak	Spacewatch	·	1.3 km	MPC · JPL
740535	2003 SH_{362}	—	September 22, 2003	Kitt Peak	Spacewatch	·	1.0 km	MPC · JPL
740536	2003 SY_{362}	—	September 22, 2003	Kitt Peak	Spacewatch	MAR	780 m	MPC · JPL
740537	2003 SC_{372}	—	September 29, 2003	Kitt Peak	Spacewatch	·	1.5 km	MPC · JPL
740538	2003 SK_{375}	—	November 14, 1998	Kitt Peak	Spacewatch	THM	1.7 km	MPC · JPL
740539	2003 SF_{380}	—	September 29, 2003	Kitt Peak	Spacewatch	·	580 m	MPC · JPL
740540	2003 SW_{388}	—	September 26, 2003	Apache Point	SDSS	·	1.2 km	MPC · JPL
740541	2003 SE_{395}	—	September 26, 2003	Apache Point	SDSS	·	520 m	MPC · JPL
740542	2003 ST_{396}	—	September 26, 2003	Apache Point	SDSS	(5)	1.1 km	MPC · JPL
740543	2003 SB_{398}	—	September 26, 2003	Apache Point	SDSS	·	2.5 km	MPC · JPL
740544	2003 ST_{401}	—	September 26, 2003	Apache Point	SDSS	·	2.0 km	MPC · JPL
740545	2003 SO_{403}	—	September 27, 2003	Kitt Peak	Spacewatch	·	530 m	MPC · JPL
740546	2003 SH_{409}	—	September 28, 2003	Apache Point	SDSS	·	1.6 km	MPC · JPL
740547	2003 SG_{417}	—	September 28, 2003	Apache Point	SDSS	·	1.4 km	MPC · JPL
740548	2003 SB_{422}	—	October 2, 2003	Kitt Peak	Spacewatch	EUN	940 m	MPC · JPL
740549	2003 SW_{428}	—	September 19, 2003	Palomar	NEAT	T_{j} (2.98) · 3:2	3.9 km	MPC · JPL
740550	2003 SW_{431}	—	September 18, 2003	Kitt Peak	Spacewatch	·	2.7 km	MPC · JPL
740551	2003 SZ_{434}	—	September 20, 2003	Kitt Peak	Spacewatch	·	1.1 km	MPC · JPL
740552	2003 SA_{437}	—	September 5, 2008	Kitt Peak	Spacewatch	·	2.1 km	MPC · JPL
740553	2003 SJ_{437}	—	September 12, 2010	Kitt Peak	Spacewatch	V	440 m	MPC · JPL
740554	2003 SU_{437}	—	September 28, 2003	Kitt Peak	Spacewatch	·	730 m	MPC · JPL
740555	2003 SV_{438}	—	August 28, 2016	Mount Lemmon	Mount Lemmon Survey	·	1.4 km	MPC · JPL
740556	2003 SD_{439}	—	September 18, 2003	Kitt Peak	Spacewatch	·	810 m	MPC · JPL
740557	2003 SE_{440}	—	September 18, 2003	Kitt Peak	Spacewatch	·	1.9 km	MPC · JPL
740558	2003 ST_{440}	—	October 2, 2010	Kitt Peak	Spacewatch	·	550 m	MPC · JPL
740559	2003 SW_{440}	—	February 9, 2016	Haleakala	Pan-STARRS 1	·	700 m	MPC · JPL
740560	2003 SB_{441}	—	September 27, 2003	Kitt Peak	Spacewatch	H	470 m	MPC · JPL
740561	2003 SF_{441}	—	September 19, 2003	Kitt Peak	Spacewatch	EUN	930 m	MPC · JPL
740562	2003 SS_{441}	—	September 18, 2003	Palomar	NEAT	H	500 m	MPC · JPL
740563	2003 SH_{443}	—	September 20, 2003	Kitt Peak	Spacewatch	·	750 m	MPC · JPL
740564	2003 SW_{443}	—	February 25, 2014	Haleakala	Pan-STARRS 1	·	1.2 km	MPC · JPL
740565	2003 SC_{445}	—	September 18, 2003	Kitt Peak	Spacewatch	·	1.2 km	MPC · JPL
740566	2003 SH_{445}	—	September 27, 2003	Kitt Peak	Spacewatch	·	640 m	MPC · JPL
740567	2003 SQ_{446}	—	September 18, 2003	Kitt Peak	Spacewatch	H	430 m	MPC · JPL
740568	2003 SU_{448}	—	August 25, 2003	Cerro Tololo	Deep Ecliptic Survey	·	1.1 km	MPC · JPL
740569	2003 SZ_{448}	—	September 18, 2003	Kitt Peak	Spacewatch	ADE	1.6 km	MPC · JPL
740570	2003 SC_{449}	—	September 18, 2003	Kitt Peak	Spacewatch	(5)	1.0 km	MPC · JPL
740571	2003 SN_{449}	—	September 28, 2003	Kitt Peak	Spacewatch	·	1.7 km	MPC · JPL
740572	2003 SN_{450}	—	March 30, 2012	Kitt Peak	Spacewatch	·	2.3 km	MPC · JPL
740573	2003 SW_{451}	—	January 7, 2013	Mount Lemmon	Mount Lemmon Survey	T_{j} (2.94)	4.5 km	MPC · JPL
740574	2003 SY_{451}	—	September 30, 2003	Kitt Peak	Spacewatch	PHO	990 m	MPC · JPL
740575	2003 SA_{452}	—	September 28, 2003	Kitt Peak	Spacewatch	·	1.4 km	MPC · JPL
740576	2003 SO_{452}	—	October 23, 2003	Kitt Peak	Spacewatch	·	640 m	MPC · JPL
740577	2003 SS_{453}	—	September 21, 2003	Kitt Peak	Spacewatch	·	870 m	MPC · JPL
740578	2003 SY_{455}	—	December 6, 2013	Haleakala	Pan-STARRS 1	·	1.4 km	MPC · JPL
740579	2003 SG_{458}	—	September 21, 2003	Kitt Peak	Spacewatch	·	950 m	MPC · JPL
740580	2003 SD_{459}	—	March 6, 2006	Kitt Peak	Spacewatch	·	1.0 km	MPC · JPL
740581	2003 SM_{462}	—	September 18, 2003	Kitt Peak	Spacewatch	·	1.7 km	MPC · JPL
740582	2003 SH_{464}	—	September 18, 2003	Kitt Peak	Spacewatch	·	1.8 km	MPC · JPL
740583	2003 ST_{464}	—	September 19, 2003	Kitt Peak	Spacewatch	·	2.3 km	MPC · JPL
740584	2003 SN_{466}	—	September 17, 2003	Kitt Peak	Spacewatch	·	1.2 km	MPC · JPL
740585	2003 ST_{468}	—	September 18, 2003	Kitt Peak	Spacewatch	·	1.0 km	MPC · JPL
740586	2003 TZ_{5}	—	October 3, 2003	Kitt Peak	Spacewatch	MAR	970 m	MPC · JPL
740587	2003 TA_{23}	—	October 1, 2003	Kitt Peak	Spacewatch	·	640 m	MPC · JPL
740588	2003 TQ_{26}	—	October 1, 2003	Kitt Peak	Spacewatch	·	1.7 km	MPC · JPL
740589	2003 TA_{31}	—	October 1, 2003	Kitt Peak	Spacewatch	·	1.9 km	MPC · JPL
740590	2003 TQ_{41}	—	October 2, 2003	Kitt Peak	Spacewatch	·	750 m	MPC · JPL
740591	2003 TW_{51}	—	September 16, 2003	Kitt Peak	Spacewatch	·	1.7 km	MPC · JPL
740592	2003 TF_{61}	—	October 2, 2003	Kitt Peak	Spacewatch	·	480 m	MPC · JPL
740593	2003 TX_{61}	—	October 2, 2003	Kitt Peak	Spacewatch	·	1.4 km	MPC · JPL
740594	2003 TD_{62}	—	October 1, 2003	Kitt Peak	Spacewatch	·	1.4 km	MPC · JPL
740595	2003 TH_{62}	—	October 2, 2003	Kitt Peak	Spacewatch	·	520 m	MPC · JPL
740596	2003 TW_{62}	—	October 4, 2003	Kitt Peak	Spacewatch	·	1.6 km	MPC · JPL
740597	2003 TD_{63}	—	October 3, 2003	Kitt Peak	Spacewatch	·	1.7 km	MPC · JPL
740598	2003 TJ_{64}	—	October 3, 2003	Kitt Peak	Spacewatch	JUN	980 m	MPC · JPL
740599	2003 TL_{65}	—	October 2, 2003	Kitt Peak	Spacewatch	·	1.0 km	MPC · JPL
740600	2003 UO_{6}	—	September 21, 2003	Anderson Mesa	LONEOS	·	3.3 km	MPC · JPL

== 740601–740700 ==
back to top

Designation			Discovery			Properties		Ref
Permanent	Provisional	Named after	Date	Site	Discoverer(s)	Category	Diam.	Ref
740601	2003 UB_{52}	—	October 18, 2003	Palomar	NEAT	·	1.6 km	MPC · JPL
740602	2003 UT_{59}	—	September 19, 2003	Palomar	NEAT	·	1.2 km	MPC · JPL
740603	2003 UG_{67}	—	October 16, 2003	Kitt Peak	Spacewatch	·	570 m	MPC · JPL
740604	2003 UQ_{69}	—	October 18, 2003	Kitt Peak	Spacewatch	·	1.6 km	MPC · JPL
740605	2003 US_{73}	—	October 19, 2003	Kitt Peak	Spacewatch	·	690 m	MPC · JPL
740606	2003 UX_{73}	—	October 28, 2003	Socorro	LINEAR	H	440 m	MPC · JPL
740607	2003 US_{75}	—	October 3, 2003	Kitt Peak	Spacewatch	·	1.0 km	MPC · JPL
740608	2003 UE_{80}	—	October 19, 2003	Palomar	NEAT	·	2.1 km	MPC · JPL
740609	2003 UR_{85}	—	October 18, 2003	Kitt Peak	Spacewatch	·	1.0 km	MPC · JPL
740610	2003 US_{89}	—	October 20, 2003	Palomar	NEAT	·	970 m	MPC · JPL
740611	2003 UJ_{97}	—	November 6, 1996	Kitt Peak	Spacewatch	·	570 m	MPC · JPL
740612	2003 UP_{111}	—	September 18, 1999	Kitt Peak	Spacewatch	·	950 m	MPC · JPL
740613	2003 UK_{119}	—	September 18, 2003	Kitt Peak	Spacewatch	·	1.4 km	MPC · JPL
740614	2003 UM_{149}	—	September 17, 2003	Palomar	NEAT	NYS	1.1 km	MPC · JPL
740615	2003 UW_{160}	—	October 21, 2003	Kitt Peak	Spacewatch	·	2.3 km	MPC · JPL
740616	2003 UP_{192}	—	October 23, 2003	Kitt Peak	Spacewatch	(1338) (FLO)	450 m	MPC · JPL
740617	2003 UG_{216}	—	October 20, 2003	Palomar	NEAT	·	640 m	MPC · JPL
740618	2003 UE_{248}	—	September 27, 2003	Kitt Peak	Spacewatch	T_{j} (2.97) · 3:2	3.9 km	MPC · JPL
740619	2003 UM_{302}	—	September 28, 2003	Kitt Peak	Spacewatch	·	1.1 km	MPC · JPL
740620	2003 UM_{326}	—	October 17, 2003	Apache Point	SDSS	EUN	930 m	MPC · JPL
740621	2003 UV_{327}	—	September 22, 2003	Kitt Peak	Spacewatch	·	1.5 km	MPC · JPL
740622	2003 UK_{341}	—	October 19, 2003	Apache Point	SDSS	·	1.2 km	MPC · JPL
740623	2003 UY_{361}	—	October 20, 2003	Kitt Peak	Spacewatch	·	1.1 km	MPC · JPL
740624	2003 UO_{363}	—	October 20, 2003	Kitt Peak	Spacewatch	·	1.4 km	MPC · JPL
740625	2003 UP_{365}	—	October 20, 2003	Kitt Peak	Spacewatch	·	540 m	MPC · JPL
740626	2003 UM_{374}	—	September 16, 2003	Kitt Peak	Spacewatch	·	960 m	MPC · JPL
740627	2003 UY_{377}	—	October 1, 2003	Anderson Mesa	LONEOS	·	2.2 km	MPC · JPL
740628	2003 UW_{378}	—	September 27, 2003	Kitt Peak	Spacewatch	EOS	1.6 km	MPC · JPL
740629	2003 UC_{379}	—	October 22, 2003	Apache Point	SDSS	·	530 m	MPC · JPL
740630	2003 UK_{380}	—	October 22, 2003	Apache Point	SDSS	MAS	540 m	MPC · JPL
740631	2003 UE_{389}	—	October 22, 2003	Apache Point	SDSS	·	2.0 km	MPC · JPL
740632	2003 UV_{397}	—	October 22, 2003	Apache Point	SDSS	EOS	1.4 km	MPC · JPL
740633	2003 UB_{399}	—	October 17, 2003	Kitt Peak	Spacewatch	·	1.1 km	MPC · JPL
740634	2003 UT_{400}	—	October 23, 2003	Apache Point	SDSS	·	1.2 km	MPC · JPL
740635	2003 UV_{407}	—	October 20, 2003	Kitt Peak	Spacewatch	·	2.0 km	MPC · JPL
740636	2003 UB_{408}	—	October 23, 2003	Apache Point	SDSS	·	800 m	MPC · JPL
740637	2003 UZ_{418}	—	October 18, 2003	Kitt Peak	Spacewatch	·	1.6 km	MPC · JPL
740638	2003 UZ_{421}	—	October 12, 2016	Haleakala	Pan-STARRS 1	·	1.4 km	MPC · JPL
740639	2003 UC_{423}	—	April 11, 2015	Catalina	CSS	PHO	760 m	MPC · JPL
740640	2003 UM_{424}	—	September 22, 2012	Kitt Peak	Spacewatch	·	1.3 km	MPC · JPL
740641	2003 UR_{425}	—	September 17, 2006	Kitt Peak	Spacewatch	·	590 m	MPC · JPL
740642	2003 UG_{426}	—	August 8, 2013	Kitt Peak	Spacewatch	·	570 m	MPC · JPL
740643	2003 UQ_{426}	—	October 22, 2003	Apache Point	SDSS	·	2.3 km	MPC · JPL
740644	2003 UX_{426}	—	October 25, 2003	Kitt Peak	Spacewatch	PHO	810 m	MPC · JPL
740645	2003 UB_{429}	—	March 15, 2016	Mount Lemmon	Mount Lemmon Survey	·	740 m	MPC · JPL
740646	2003 UC_{429}	—	October 13, 2010	Kitt Peak	Spacewatch	·	590 m	MPC · JPL
740647	2003 UG_{430}	—	April 5, 2014	Haleakala	Pan-STARRS 1	HNS	860 m	MPC · JPL
740648	2003 UL_{430}	—	April 20, 2014	Mount Lemmon	Mount Lemmon Survey	HNS	840 m	MPC · JPL
740649	2003 UC_{434}	—	September 7, 2015	Catalina	CSS	MAR	810 m	MPC · JPL
740650	2003 UP_{434}	—	March 27, 2016	Mount Lemmon	Mount Lemmon Survey	·	1.7 km	MPC · JPL
740651	2003 UC_{435}	—	September 4, 2008	Kitt Peak	Spacewatch	·	1.5 km	MPC · JPL
740652	2003 UJ_{435}	—	May 21, 2014	Haleakala	Pan-STARRS 1	·	880 m	MPC · JPL
740653	2003 UP_{437}	—	October 23, 2003	Kitt Peak	Spacewatch	·	1.1 km	MPC · JPL
740654	2003 UW_{439}	—	September 3, 2013	Kitt Peak	Spacewatch	·	640 m	MPC · JPL
740655	2003 UO_{440}	—	April 5, 1995	Kitt Peak	Spacewatch	·	2.0 km	MPC · JPL
740656	2003 UE_{441}	—	December 1, 2014	Haleakala	Pan-STARRS 1	EOS	1.5 km	MPC · JPL
740657	2003 UM_{442}	—	March 18, 2016	Mount Lemmon	Mount Lemmon Survey	·	2.3 km	MPC · JPL
740658	2003 UN_{442}	—	December 28, 2014	Mount Lemmon	Mount Lemmon Survey	·	1.5 km	MPC · JPL
740659	2003 UA_{444}	—	October 19, 2003	Kitt Peak	Spacewatch	HNS	870 m	MPC · JPL
740660	2003 UR_{444}	—	October 17, 2003	Kitt Peak	Spacewatch	·	1.5 km	MPC · JPL
740661	2003 UY_{444}	—	October 23, 2003	Kitt Peak	Spacewatch	·	3.2 km	MPC · JPL
740662	2003 UG_{447}	—	October 20, 2003	Palomar	NEAT	·	1.1 km	MPC · JPL
740663	2003 UA_{450}	—	October 21, 2003	Palomar	NEAT	EOS	1.7 km	MPC · JPL
740664	2003 VL_{13}	—	November 15, 2003	Kitt Peak	Spacewatch	EOS	1.5 km	MPC · JPL
740665	2003 VO_{13}	—	November 15, 2003	Kitt Peak	Spacewatch	·	680 m	MPC · JPL
740666	2003 WK_{9}	—	November 18, 2003	Kitt Peak	Spacewatch	EUP	3.3 km	MPC · JPL
740667	2003 WO_{26}	—	November 21, 2003	Socorro	LINEAR	H	530 m	MPC · JPL
740668	2003 WF_{38}	—	November 19, 2003	Socorro	LINEAR	·	1.1 km	MPC · JPL
740669	2003 WJ_{51}	—	November 14, 2003	Palomar	NEAT	·	1.4 km	MPC · JPL
740670	2003 WL_{88}	—	November 20, 2003	Socorro	LINEAR	H	400 m	MPC · JPL
740671	2003 WL_{90}	—	October 28, 2003	Socorro	LINEAR	·	2.2 km	MPC · JPL
740672	2003 WN_{100}	—	November 20, 2003	Palomar	NEAT	H	670 m	MPC · JPL
740673	2003 WJ_{151}	—	November 26, 2003	Kitt Peak	Spacewatch	·	2.2 km	MPC · JPL
740674	2003 WH_{172}	—	November 30, 2003	Socorro	LINEAR	·	800 m	MPC · JPL
740675	2003 WA_{175}	—	November 19, 2003	Kitt Peak	Spacewatch	·	1.0 km	MPC · JPL
740676	2003 WE_{177}	—	November 20, 2003	Kitt Peak	Deep Ecliptic Survey	·	730 m	MPC · JPL
740677	2003 WR_{196}	—	October 28, 2010	Mount Lemmon	Mount Lemmon Survey	·	640 m	MPC · JPL
740678	2003 WD_{197}	—	February 8, 2008	Kitt Peak	Spacewatch	·	560 m	MPC · JPL
740679	2003 WU_{199}	—	September 22, 2012	Kitt Peak	Spacewatch	AGN	940 m	MPC · JPL
740680	2003 WY_{199}	—	August 29, 2006	Kitt Peak	Spacewatch	V	490 m	MPC · JPL
740681	2003 WR_{202}	—	September 10, 2013	Haleakala	Pan-STARRS 1	·	520 m	MPC · JPL
740682	2003 WD_{203}	—	November 9, 2007	Mount Lemmon	Mount Lemmon Survey	HNS	890 m	MPC · JPL
740683	2003 WW_{203}	—	June 11, 2011	Haleakala	Pan-STARRS 1	·	2.1 km	MPC · JPL
740684	2003 WR_{204}	—	November 19, 2003	Anderson Mesa	LONEOS	(1547)	1.0 km	MPC · JPL
740685	2003 WR_{206}	—	January 18, 2016	Mount Lemmon	Mount Lemmon Survey	·	2.2 km	MPC · JPL
740686	2003 WL_{207}	—	March 14, 2016	Mount Lemmon	Mount Lemmon Survey	EOS	1.7 km	MPC · JPL
740687	2003 WS_{207}	—	November 20, 2003	Kitt Peak	Spacewatch	·	930 m	MPC · JPL
740688	2003 WS_{213}	—	November 20, 2003	Kitt Peak	Spacewatch	·	1.2 km	MPC · JPL
740689	2003 WH_{215}	—	November 20, 2003	Kitt Peak	Spacewatch	(2076)	540 m	MPC · JPL
740690	2003 WA_{216}	—	November 24, 2003	Kitt Peak	Spacewatch	·	1.3 km	MPC · JPL
740691	2003 WD_{216}	—	November 30, 2003	Kitt Peak	Spacewatch	·	1.4 km	MPC · JPL
740692	2003 WE_{216}	—	November 19, 2003	Kitt Peak	Spacewatch	(194)	1.1 km	MPC · JPL
740693	2003 XB_{15}	—	December 1, 2003	Socorro	LINEAR	PHO	930 m	MPC · JPL
740694	2003 XZ_{16}	—	November 19, 2003	Campo Imperatore	CINEOS	JUN	850 m	MPC · JPL
740695	2003 XU_{45}	—	November 17, 2014	Haleakala	Pan-STARRS 1	TIR	2.0 km	MPC · JPL
740696	2003 XH_{46}	—	March 4, 2016	Haleakala	Pan-STARRS 1	·	1.8 km	MPC · JPL
740697	2003 YH_{30}	—	December 18, 2003	Socorro	LINEAR	·	1.3 km	MPC · JPL
740698	2003 YL_{30}	—	December 18, 2003	Socorro	LINEAR	·	2.0 km	MPC · JPL
740699	2003 YB_{38}	—	December 19, 2003	Kitt Peak	Spacewatch	EOS	1.8 km	MPC · JPL
740700	2003 YO_{41}	—	December 19, 2003	Kitt Peak	Spacewatch	·	650 m	MPC · JPL

== 740701–740800 ==
back to top

Designation			Discovery			Properties		Ref
Permanent	Provisional	Named after	Date	Site	Discoverer(s)	Category	Diam.	Ref
740701	2003 YN_{42}	—	December 19, 2003	Kitt Peak	Spacewatch	·	1.4 km	MPC · JPL
740702	2003 YW_{68}	—	December 19, 2003	Kitt Peak	Spacewatch	·	1.2 km	MPC · JPL
740703	2003 YP_{119}	—	December 22, 2003	Socorro	LINEAR	·	2.1 km	MPC · JPL
740704	2003 YK_{124}	—	December 17, 2003	Kitt Peak	Spacewatch	(5)	1 km	MPC · JPL
740705	2003 YY_{141}	—	December 17, 2003	Socorro	LINEAR	·	1.2 km	MPC · JPL
740706	2003 YF_{157}	—	December 16, 2003	Kitt Peak	Spacewatch	GEF	980 m	MPC · JPL
740707	2003 YB_{183}	—	December 29, 2003	Catalina	CSS	·	1.5 km	MPC · JPL
740708	2003 YR_{184}	—	December 19, 2003	Kitt Peak	Spacewatch	·	1.5 km	MPC · JPL
740709	2003 YS_{184}	—	December 17, 2003	Kitt Peak	Spacewatch	LIX	2.8 km	MPC · JPL
740710	2003 YR_{186}	—	September 15, 2013	Mount Lemmon	Mount Lemmon Survey	·	2.9 km	MPC · JPL
740711	2003 YU_{186}	—	December 17, 2003	Kitt Peak	Spacewatch	(5)	980 m	MPC · JPL
740712	2003 YB_{189}	—	May 8, 2010	WISE	WISE	·	2.2 km	MPC · JPL
740713	2003 YE_{189}	—	November 23, 2014	Mount Lemmon	Mount Lemmon Survey	·	2.0 km	MPC · JPL
740714	2003 YH_{189}	—	November 26, 2014	Haleakala	Pan-STARRS 1	·	2.0 km	MPC · JPL
740715	2004 AX_{2}	—	January 14, 2004	Palomar	NEAT	·	660 m	MPC · JPL
740716	2004 AB_{15}	—	January 15, 2004	Kitt Peak	Spacewatch	·	3.7 km	MPC · JPL
740717	2004 AJ_{27}	—	January 13, 2015	Haleakala	Pan-STARRS 1	·	2.3 km	MPC · JPL
740718	2004 BY_{7}	—	December 19, 2003	Kitt Peak	Spacewatch	·	1.4 km	MPC · JPL
740719	2004 BA_{8}	—	December 19, 2003	Kitt Peak	Spacewatch	·	1.8 km	MPC · JPL
740720	2004 BU_{16}	—	December 30, 2003	Socorro	LINEAR	HNS	1.2 km	MPC · JPL
740721	2004 BQ_{66}	—	January 22, 2004	Socorro	LINEAR	·	980 m	MPC · JPL
740722	2004 BA_{125}	—	January 16, 2004	Kitt Peak	Spacewatch	MAS	560 m	MPC · JPL
740723	2004 BT_{125}	—	January 16, 2004	Kitt Peak	Spacewatch	·	2.7 km	MPC · JPL
740724	2004 BU_{155}	—	January 28, 2004	Kitt Peak	Spacewatch	·	810 m	MPC · JPL
740725	2004 BP_{164}	—	December 13, 2010	Mount Lemmon	Mount Lemmon Survey	·	740 m	MPC · JPL
740726	2004 BR_{165}	—	January 19, 2004	Kitt Peak	Spacewatch	·	500 m	MPC · JPL
740727	2004 BH_{166}	—	January 19, 2004	Kitt Peak	Spacewatch	·	740 m	MPC · JPL
740728	2004 BY_{166}	—	July 13, 2013	Haleakala	Pan-STARRS 1	NYS	750 m	MPC · JPL
740729	2004 BA_{167}	—	February 29, 2004	Kitt Peak	Spacewatch	·	1.3 km	MPC · JPL
740730	2004 BZ_{167}	—	July 30, 2013	Kitt Peak	Spacewatch	·	1.7 km	MPC · JPL
740731	2004 BP_{168}	—	March 8, 2013	Haleakala	Pan-STARRS 1	EUN	800 m	MPC · JPL
740732	2004 BY_{168}	—	July 13, 2013	Haleakala	Pan-STARRS 1	·	720 m	MPC · JPL
740733	2004 BE_{169}	—	September 3, 2013	Haleakala	Pan-STARRS 1	·	1.8 km	MPC · JPL
740734	2004 BF_{169}	—	December 26, 2014	Haleakala	Pan-STARRS 1	·	1.7 km	MPC · JPL
740735	2004 BH_{169}	—	December 15, 2014	Mount Lemmon	Mount Lemmon Survey	·	2.9 km	MPC · JPL
740736	2004 BR_{170}	—	November 19, 2008	Kitt Peak	Spacewatch	·	2.7 km	MPC · JPL
740737	2004 BZ_{170}	—	February 8, 2015	Mount Lemmon	Mount Lemmon Survey	·	2.3 km	MPC · JPL
740738	2004 BL_{171}	—	October 8, 2011	Westfield	R. Holmes	·	1.1 km	MPC · JPL
740739	2004 BO_{171}	—	September 23, 2015	Haleakala	Pan-STARRS 1	·	1.5 km	MPC · JPL
740740	2004 BF_{172}	—	February 12, 2018	Haleakala	Pan-STARRS 1	EUN	1.1 km	MPC · JPL
740741	2004 BT_{172}	—	January 20, 2015	Haleakala	Pan-STARRS 1	EOS	1.7 km	MPC · JPL
740742	2004 CK_{17}	—	January 30, 2004	Kitt Peak	Spacewatch	H	490 m	MPC · JPL
740743	2004 CH_{60}	—	January 18, 2004	Palomar	NEAT	·	1.5 km	MPC · JPL
740744	2004 CE_{81}	—	February 12, 2004	Kitt Peak	Spacewatch	·	2.1 km	MPC · JPL
740745	2004 CJ_{88}	—	February 11, 2004	Kitt Peak	Spacewatch	ADE	1.3 km	MPC · JPL
740746	2004 CU_{110}	—	January 30, 2004	Kitt Peak	Spacewatch	·	700 m	MPC · JPL
740747	2004 CJ_{114}	—	February 18, 2004	Kitt Peak	Spacewatch	JUN	980 m	MPC · JPL
740748	2004 CG_{122}	—	February 12, 2004	Kitt Peak	Spacewatch	(5)	990 m	MPC · JPL
740749	2004 CD_{124}	—	February 12, 2004	Kitt Peak	Spacewatch	VER	2.4 km	MPC · JPL
740750	2004 CT_{131}	—	February 11, 2008	Mount Lemmon	Mount Lemmon Survey	NYS	960 m	MPC · JPL
740751	2004 CW_{131}	—	April 13, 2013	Haleakala	Pan-STARRS 1	·	980 m	MPC · JPL
740752	2004 CN_{133}	—	December 6, 2013	Haleakala	Pan-STARRS 1	·	1.5 km	MPC · JPL
740753	2004 CY_{135}	—	October 16, 2013	Mount Lemmon	Mount Lemmon Survey	·	2.3 km	MPC · JPL
740754	2004 DE_{8}	—	February 17, 2004	Kitt Peak	Spacewatch	·	2.2 km	MPC · JPL
740755	2004 DO_{9}	—	February 17, 2004	Socorro	LINEAR	·	1.6 km	MPC · JPL
740756	2004 DZ_{23}	—	February 19, 2004	Socorro	LINEAR	H	440 m	MPC · JPL
740757	2004 DQ_{29}	—	February 17, 2004	Kitt Peak	Spacewatch	·	1.7 km	MPC · JPL
740758	2004 DX_{54}	—	February 12, 2004	Kitt Peak	Spacewatch	NYS	660 m	MPC · JPL
740759	2004 DQ_{63}	—	February 17, 2004	Kitt Peak	Spacewatch	·	1.5 km	MPC · JPL
740760	2004 DW_{63}	—	February 29, 2004	Kitt Peak	Spacewatch	·	550 m	MPC · JPL
740761	2004 DU_{73}	—	February 17, 2004	Kitt Peak	Spacewatch	·	1.3 km	MPC · JPL
740762	2004 DM_{75}	—	February 17, 2004	Kitt Peak	Spacewatch	·	1.2 km	MPC · JPL
740763	2004 DS_{75}	—	February 17, 2004	Kitt Peak	Spacewatch	·	590 m	MPC · JPL
740764	2004 DE_{79}	—	February 18, 2004	Calar Alto	J. L. Ortiz, Santos-Sanz, P.	·	810 m	MPC · JPL
740765	2004 DW_{80}	—	February 26, 2004	Kitt Peak	Deep Ecliptic Survey	·	920 m	MPC · JPL
740766	2004 DC_{81}	—	May 14, 2008	Mount Lemmon	Mount Lemmon Survey	·	940 m	MPC · JPL
740767	2004 DL_{81}	—	October 22, 2006	Kitt Peak	Spacewatch	·	540 m	MPC · JPL
740768	2004 DH_{83}	—	November 6, 2013	Haleakala	Pan-STARRS 1	·	2.5 km	MPC · JPL
740769	2004 DL_{83}	—	March 14, 2013	Kitt Peak	Spacewatch	·	990 m	MPC · JPL
740770	2004 DY_{83}	—	November 2, 2008	Catalina	CSS	·	2.9 km	MPC · JPL
740771	2004 EC_{13}	—	March 11, 2004	Palomar	NEAT	·	880 m	MPC · JPL
740772	2004 EE_{48}	—	March 15, 2004	Socorro	LINEAR	H	470 m	MPC · JPL
740773	2004 EV_{65}	—	March 14, 2004	Kitt Peak	Spacewatch	·	1.3 km	MPC · JPL
740774	2004 EO_{87}	—	March 14, 2004	Kitt Peak	Spacewatch	·	630 m	MPC · JPL
740775	2004 EC_{88}	—	March 14, 2004	Kitt Peak	Spacewatch	·	2.9 km	MPC · JPL
740776	2004 ET_{89}	—	March 14, 2004	Kitt Peak	Spacewatch	·	910 m	MPC · JPL
740777	2004 EO_{97}	—	March 15, 2004	Kitt Peak	Spacewatch	·	710 m	MPC · JPL
740778	2004 EF_{98}	—	March 15, 2004	Kitt Peak	Spacewatch	MAR	720 m	MPC · JPL
740779	2004 EL_{104}	—	March 15, 2004	Kitt Peak	Spacewatch	·	1.4 km	MPC · JPL
740780	2004 EQ_{105}	—	March 15, 2004	Kitt Peak	Spacewatch	·	1.2 km	MPC · JPL
740781	2004 EN_{106}	—	March 15, 2004	Kitt Peak	Spacewatch	TIR	2.3 km	MPC · JPL
740782	2004 EK_{109}	—	March 15, 2004	Kitt Peak	Spacewatch	NYS	680 m	MPC · JPL
740783	2004 EM_{115}	—	February 24, 2004	Haleakala	NEAT	·	3.0 km	MPC · JPL
740784	2004 EU_{116}	—	February 25, 2011	Mount Lemmon	Mount Lemmon Survey	·	680 m	MPC · JPL
740785	2004 ER_{117}	—	February 10, 2011	Mount Lemmon	Mount Lemmon Survey	·	660 m	MPC · JPL
740786	2004 EY_{117}	—	March 14, 2004	Kitt Peak	Spacewatch	H	360 m	MPC · JPL
740787	2004 FQ_{6}	—	March 16, 2004	Kitt Peak	Spacewatch	·	2.5 km	MPC · JPL
740788	2004 FO_{10}	—	March 17, 2004	Kitt Peak	Spacewatch	EUN	1.3 km	MPC · JPL
740789	2004 FZ_{10}	—	February 16, 2004	Kitt Peak	Spacewatch	·	970 m	MPC · JPL
740790	2004 FS_{58}	—	March 17, 2004	Kitt Peak	Spacewatch	NYS	900 m	MPC · JPL
740791	2004 FS_{136}	—	March 21, 2004	Kitt Peak	Spacewatch	H	430 m	MPC · JPL
740792	2004 FK_{159}	—	March 18, 2004	Kitt Peak	Spacewatch	·	2.0 km	MPC · JPL
740793	2004 FQ_{168}	—	October 9, 2005	Kitt Peak	Spacewatch	NYS	910 m	MPC · JPL
740794	2004 FK_{169}	—	November 28, 2011	Kitt Peak	Spacewatch	·	1.3 km	MPC · JPL
740795	2004 FX_{170}	—	March 16, 2004	Kitt Peak	Spacewatch	·	2.8 km	MPC · JPL
740796	2004 FD_{171}	—	February 7, 2011	Mount Lemmon	Mount Lemmon Survey	·	700 m	MPC · JPL
740797	2004 FP_{171}	—	July 7, 2016	Haleakala	Pan-STARRS 1	·	920 m	MPC · JPL
740798	2004 FZ_{171}	—	January 20, 2015	Mount Lemmon	Mount Lemmon Survey	·	1.1 km	MPC · JPL
740799	2004 FE_{172}	—	February 14, 2013	Haleakala	Pan-STARRS 1	·	1.4 km	MPC · JPL
740800	2004 FF_{174}	—	March 22, 2017	Haleakala	Pan-STARRS 1	EUN	920 m	MPC · JPL

== 740801–740900 ==
back to top

Designation			Discovery			Properties		Ref
Permanent	Provisional	Named after	Date	Site	Discoverer(s)	Category	Diam.	Ref
740801	2004 FO_{174}	—	July 25, 2015	Haleakala	Pan-STARRS 1	BAR	940 m	MPC · JPL
740802	2004 FU_{177}	—	March 29, 2004	Kitt Peak	Spacewatch	·	910 m	MPC · JPL
740803	2004 GJ_{7}	—	March 15, 2004	Kitt Peak	Spacewatch	·	1.4 km	MPC · JPL
740804	2004 GW_{17}	—	April 12, 2004	Kitt Peak	Spacewatch	·	1.4 km	MPC · JPL
740805	2004 GG_{22}	—	April 12, 2004	Palomar	NEAT	·	960 m	MPC · JPL
740806	2004 GN_{55}	—	April 13, 2004	Kitt Peak	Spacewatch	NYS	910 m	MPC · JPL
740807	2004 GS_{74}	—	April 15, 2004	Socorro	LINEAR	·	1.5 km	MPC · JPL
740808	2004 GL_{84}	—	March 23, 2004	Kitt Peak	Spacewatch	·	2.6 km	MPC · JPL
740809	2004 HO_{5}	—	April 9, 2004	Siding Spring	SSS	·	1.5 km	MPC · JPL
740810	2004 HK_{14}	—	April 16, 2004	Kitt Peak	Spacewatch	NYS	920 m	MPC · JPL
740811	2004 HQ_{19}	—	April 20, 2004	Kitt Peak	Spacewatch	·	1.4 km	MPC · JPL
740812	2004 HZ_{49}	—	April 23, 2004	Kitt Peak	Spacewatch	·	710 m	MPC · JPL
740813	2004 HC_{71}	—	April 25, 2004	Kitt Peak	Spacewatch	NYS	780 m	MPC · JPL
740814	2004 HG_{81}	—	February 7, 2011	Mayhill-ISON	L. Elenin	·	870 m	MPC · JPL
740815	2004 HK_{81}	—	April 23, 2004	Kitt Peak	Spacewatch	JUN	850 m	MPC · JPL
740816	2004 HA_{82}	—	November 14, 2015	Mount Lemmon	Mount Lemmon Survey	(194)	1.5 km	MPC · JPL
740817	2004 HX_{82}	—	September 27, 2006	Kitt Peak	Spacewatch	ADE	1.6 km	MPC · JPL
740818	2004 HR_{83}	—	May 12, 2013	Haleakala	Pan-STARRS 1	·	1.3 km	MPC · JPL
740819	2004 HH_{84}	—	February 4, 2017	Haleakala	Pan-STARRS 1	·	1.1 km	MPC · JPL
740820	2004 HK_{84}	—	June 25, 2015	Haleakala	Pan-STARRS 1	·	620 m	MPC · JPL
740821	2004 HZ_{84}	—	January 14, 2011	Mount Lemmon	Mount Lemmon Survey	·	900 m	MPC · JPL
740822	2004 JL_{10}	—	May 12, 2004	Catalina	CSS	·	1.0 km	MPC · JPL
740823	2004 JO_{40}	—	May 14, 2004	Kitt Peak	Spacewatch	·	960 m	MPC · JPL
740824	2004 JB_{55}	—	April 15, 2004	Anderson Mesa	LONEOS	·	1.3 km	MPC · JPL
740825	2004 KV_{19}	—	October 22, 2012	Kitt Peak	Spacewatch	EUP	3.8 km	MPC · JPL
740826	2004 KX_{19}	—	May 23, 2004	Kitt Peak	Spacewatch	·	1.2 km	MPC · JPL
740827	2004 KX_{20}	—	November 3, 2012	Mount Lemmon	Mount Lemmon Survey	EUP	2.8 km	MPC · JPL
740828	2004 KV_{21}	—	February 15, 2012	Haleakala	Pan-STARRS 1	·	1.5 km	MPC · JPL
740829	2004 LH_{10}	—	April 28, 2004	Kitt Peak	Spacewatch	·	840 m	MPC · JPL
740830	2004 LE_{32}	—	July 19, 2015	Haleakala	Pan-STARRS 2	H	510 m	MPC · JPL
740831	2004 MA_{7}	—	June 24, 2004	Socorro	LINEAR	·	1.3 km	MPC · JPL
740832	2004 MU_{9}	—	September 30, 2016	Haleakala	Pan-STARRS 1	·	1 km	MPC · JPL
740833	2004 NF_{29}	—	July 14, 2004	Socorro	LINEAR	·	1.4 km	MPC · JPL
740834	2004 NF_{34}	—	April 21, 2009	Mount Lemmon	Mount Lemmon Survey	DOR	1.9 km	MPC · JPL
740835	2004 OO_{16}	—	July 16, 2004	Siding Spring	SSS	PHO	710 m	MPC · JPL
740836	2004 PB	—	August 5, 2004	Palomar	NEAT	JUN	950 m	MPC · JPL
740837	2004 PB_{1}	—	August 6, 2004	Palomar	NEAT	·	590 m	MPC · JPL
740838	2004 PN_{5}	—	August 6, 2004	Palomar	NEAT	PHO	810 m	MPC · JPL
740839	2004 PO_{12}	—	August 7, 2004	Palomar	NEAT	·	1.2 km	MPC · JPL
740840	2004 PQ_{46}	—	August 7, 2004	Campo Imperatore	CINEOS	·	1.3 km	MPC · JPL
740841	2004 PU_{68}	—	August 7, 2004	Campo Imperatore	CINEOS	·	510 m	MPC · JPL
740842	2004 PX_{75}	—	June 14, 2004	Kitt Peak	Spacewatch	·	1.7 km	MPC · JPL
740843	2004 QK	—	August 17, 2004	Wrightwood	J. W. Young	·	2.7 km	MPC · JPL
740844	2004 QR_{3}	—	August 21, 2004	Catalina	CSS	·	640 m	MPC · JPL
740845	2004 QK_{32}	—	November 7, 2008	Mount Lemmon	Mount Lemmon Survey	V	430 m	MPC · JPL
740846	2004 QB_{33}	—	March 11, 2007	Mount Lemmon	Mount Lemmon Survey	NYS	990 m	MPC · JPL
740847	2004 QC_{35}	—	August 22, 2004	Kitt Peak	Spacewatch	ADE	1.7 km	MPC · JPL
740848	2004 QG_{37}	—	August 25, 2004	Kitt Peak	Spacewatch	·	750 m	MPC · JPL
740849	2004 QZ_{37}	—	August 25, 2004	Kitt Peak	Spacewatch	SYL	3.1 km	MPC · JPL
740850	2004 RM_{6}	—	August 7, 2004	Palomar	NEAT	·	610 m	MPC · JPL
740851	2004 RZ_{19}	—	September 7, 2004	Socorro	LINEAR	·	1.2 km	MPC · JPL
740852	2004 RV_{39}	—	August 12, 2004	Campo Imperatore	CINEOS	·	670 m	MPC · JPL
740853	2004 RE_{55}	—	August 12, 2004	Socorro	LINEAR	·	650 m	MPC · JPL
740854	2004 RU_{84}	—	September 9, 2004	Socorro	LINEAR	H	400 m	MPC · JPL
740855	2004 RQ_{90}	—	August 25, 2004	Kitt Peak	Spacewatch	·	820 m	MPC · JPL
740856	2004 RO_{93}	—	August 12, 2004	Palomar	NEAT	·	940 m	MPC · JPL
740857	2004 RE_{98}	—	August 12, 2004	Socorro	LINEAR	·	860 m	MPC · JPL
740858	2004 RO_{115}	—	September 7, 2004	Kitt Peak	Spacewatch	·	1.2 km	MPC · JPL
740859	2004 RP_{116}	—	September 7, 2004	Kitt Peak	Spacewatch	·	2.0 km	MPC · JPL
740860	2004 RL_{121}	—	September 7, 2004	Kitt Peak	Spacewatch	·	1.1 km	MPC · JPL
740861	2004 RC_{159}	—	September 10, 2004	Socorro	LINEAR	·	1.2 km	MPC · JPL
740862	2004 RZ_{163}	—	September 10, 2004	Socorro	LINEAR	·	1.9 km	MPC · JPL
740863	2004 RQ_{237}	—	September 10, 2004	Kitt Peak	Spacewatch	·	1.2 km	MPC · JPL
740864	2004 RN_{268}	—	September 11, 2004	Kitt Peak	Spacewatch	·	1.1 km	MPC · JPL
740865	2004 RM_{273}	—	September 11, 2004	Kitt Peak	Spacewatch	·	1.5 km	MPC · JPL
740866	2004 RR_{282}	—	September 15, 2004	Kitt Peak	Spacewatch	·	1.4 km	MPC · JPL
740867	2004 RL_{302}	—	September 11, 2004	Kitt Peak	Spacewatch	·	1.6 km	MPC · JPL
740868	2004 RD_{331}	—	September 15, 2004	Kitt Peak	Spacewatch	·	1.7 km	MPC · JPL
740869	2004 RO_{354}	—	September 11, 2004	Kitt Peak	Spacewatch	·	600 m	MPC · JPL
740870	2004 RO_{364}	—	November 30, 2008	Kitt Peak	Spacewatch	·	810 m	MPC · JPL
740871	2004 RT_{364}	—	July 23, 2015	Haleakala	Pan-STARRS 1	·	1.0 km	MPC · JPL
740872	2004 SV	—	September 16, 2004	Socorro	LINEAR	EUP	2.9 km	MPC · JPL
740873	2004 SZ_{7}	—	September 17, 2004	Kitt Peak	Spacewatch	LIX	2.8 km	MPC · JPL
740874	2004 SL_{44}	—	September 8, 2004	Palomar	NEAT	·	1.5 km	MPC · JPL
740875	2004 TF_{13}	—	October 7, 2004	Palomar	NEAT	H	430 m	MPC · JPL
740876	2004 TV_{15}	—	September 18, 2004	Socorro	LINEAR	(1547)	1.2 km	MPC · JPL
740877	2004 TO_{31}	—	October 4, 2004	Kitt Peak	Spacewatch	·	840 m	MPC · JPL
740878	2004 TX_{39}	—	October 4, 2004	Kitt Peak	Spacewatch	MAS	460 m	MPC · JPL
740879	2004 TL_{42}	—	October 4, 2004	Kitt Peak	Spacewatch	·	480 m	MPC · JPL
740880	2004 TK_{48}	—	October 4, 2004	Kitt Peak	Spacewatch	·	1.4 km	MPC · JPL
740881	2004 TQ_{56}	—	September 18, 2004	Socorro	LINEAR	·	580 m	MPC · JPL
740882	2004 TC_{72}	—	October 6, 2004	Kitt Peak	Spacewatch	·	940 m	MPC · JPL
740883	2004 TP_{88}	—	October 5, 2004	Kitt Peak	Spacewatch	·	1.6 km	MPC · JPL
740884	2004 TU_{93}	—	September 17, 2004	Kitt Peak	Spacewatch	·	760 m	MPC · JPL
740885	2004 TK_{106}	—	September 26, 1995	Kitt Peak	Spacewatch	·	1.4 km	MPC · JPL
740886	2004 TE_{111}	—	October 7, 2004	Socorro	LINEAR	·	1.4 km	MPC · JPL
740887	2004 TG_{127}	—	August 15, 2004	Siding Spring	SSS	·	1.2 km	MPC · JPL
740888	2004 TQ_{149}	—	September 22, 2004	Kitt Peak	Spacewatch	·	590 m	MPC · JPL
740889	2004 TG_{164}	—	October 6, 2004	Kitt Peak	Spacewatch	BRA	1.1 km	MPC · JPL
740890	2004 TY_{223}	—	October 8, 2004	Kitt Peak	Spacewatch	·	490 m	MPC · JPL
740891	2004 TN_{227}	—	September 17, 2004	Kitt Peak	Spacewatch	·	1.3 km	MPC · JPL
740892	2004 TR_{249}	—	October 7, 2004	Kitt Peak	Spacewatch	·	540 m	MPC · JPL
740893	2004 TN_{276}	—	October 9, 2004	Kitt Peak	Spacewatch	·	530 m	MPC · JPL
740894	2004 TF_{281}	—	October 10, 2004	Kitt Peak	Spacewatch	·	560 m	MPC · JPL
740895	2004 TR_{288}	—	October 10, 2004	Kitt Peak	Spacewatch	·	1.6 km	MPC · JPL
740896	2004 TH_{308}	—	October 10, 2004	Socorro	LINEAR	PHO	800 m	MPC · JPL
740897	2004 TT_{312}	—	October 11, 2004	Kitt Peak	Spacewatch	·	1.0 km	MPC · JPL
740898	2004 TL_{326}	—	October 14, 2004	Palomar	NEAT	·	2.0 km	MPC · JPL
740899	2004 TP_{328}	—	September 17, 2004	Socorro	LINEAR	·	780 m	MPC · JPL
740900	2004 TW_{340}	—	October 13, 2004	Kitt Peak	Spacewatch	·	860 m	MPC · JPL

== 740901–741000 ==
back to top

Designation			Discovery			Properties		Ref
Permanent	Provisional	Named after	Date	Site	Discoverer(s)	Category	Diam.	Ref
740901	2004 TM_{345}	—	October 8, 2004	Kitt Peak	Spacewatch	·	2.1 km	MPC · JPL
740902	2004 TM_{353}	—	October 11, 2004	Kitt Peak	Deep Ecliptic Survey	·	1.9 km	MPC · JPL
740903	2004 TO_{371}	—	September 21, 2012	Mount Lemmon	Mount Lemmon Survey	T_{j} (2.99) · 3:2	3.3 km	MPC · JPL
740904	2004 TV_{373}	—	February 15, 2010	Mount Lemmon	Mount Lemmon Survey	·	950 m	MPC · JPL
740905	2004 TC_{374}	—	September 28, 2009	Kitt Peak	Spacewatch	·	1.7 km	MPC · JPL
740906	2004 TG_{374}	—	October 13, 2004	Kitt Peak	Spacewatch	·	1.6 km	MPC · JPL
740907	2004 TH_{374}	—	September 26, 2011	Mayhill-ISON	L. Elenin	·	520 m	MPC · JPL
740908	2004 TP_{375}	—	October 10, 2015	Kitt Peak	Spacewatch	·	2.5 km	MPC · JPL
740909	2004 TY_{379}	—	September 10, 2013	Haleakala	Pan-STARRS 1	·	1.7 km	MPC · JPL
740910	2004 TZ_{383}	—	November 9, 2009	Mount Lemmon	Mount Lemmon Survey	·	1.6 km	MPC · JPL
740911	2004 VR_{3}	—	October 8, 2004	Kitt Peak	Spacewatch	T_{j} (2.99) · 3:2 · SHU	4.5 km	MPC · JPL
740912	2004 VA_{37}	—	October 23, 2004	Kitt Peak	Spacewatch	3:2 · SHU	4.0 km	MPC · JPL
740913	2004 VA_{50}	—	November 4, 2004	Kitt Peak	Spacewatch	·	1.8 km	MPC · JPL
740914	2004 VV_{82}	—	November 10, 2004	Kitt Peak	Spacewatch	·	1.1 km	MPC · JPL
740915	2004 VC_{85}	—	November 10, 2004	Kitt Peak	Spacewatch	(8737)	2.4 km	MPC · JPL
740916	2004 VD_{93}	—	October 15, 2004	Mount Lemmon	Mount Lemmon Survey	MAS	530 m	MPC · JPL
740917	2004 VN_{137}	—	December 18, 2015	Mount Lemmon	Mount Lemmon Survey	·	900 m	MPC · JPL
740918	2004 VJ_{138}	—	November 10, 2004	Kitt Peak	Spacewatch	·	1.7 km	MPC · JPL
740919	2004 WD_{4}	—	November 17, 2004	Campo Imperatore	CINEOS	·	530 m	MPC · JPL
740920	2004 WZ_{12}	—	November 17, 2004	Campo Imperatore	CINEOS	·	630 m	MPC · JPL
740921	2004 XK_{6}	—	November 11, 2004	Catalina	CSS	BAR	1.1 km	MPC · JPL
740922	2004 XX_{11}	—	December 7, 2004	Socorro	LINEAR	TIR	2.8 km	MPC · JPL
740923	2004 XV_{52}	—	December 9, 2004	Kitt Peak	Spacewatch	·	1.2 km	MPC · JPL
740924	2004 XO_{59}	—	December 11, 2004	Kitt Peak	Spacewatch	·	1.4 km	MPC · JPL
740925	2004 XN_{88}	—	December 10, 2004	Socorro	LINEAR	·	600 m	MPC · JPL
740926	2004 XV_{151}	—	December 15, 2004	Kitt Peak	Spacewatch	·	1.7 km	MPC · JPL
740927	2004 XQ_{159}	—	December 14, 2004	Kitt Peak	Spacewatch	EUN	760 m	MPC · JPL
740928	2004 XK_{163}	—	December 15, 2004	Kitt Peak	Spacewatch	·	500 m	MPC · JPL
740929	2004 XB_{174}	—	December 3, 2004	Kitt Peak	Spacewatch	·	1.2 km	MPC · JPL
740930	2004 XP_{195}	—	October 17, 2012	Mount Lemmon	Mount Lemmon Survey	·	860 m	MPC · JPL
740931	2004 XQ_{195}	—	January 2, 2016	Mount Lemmon	Mount Lemmon Survey	·	1.8 km	MPC · JPL
740932	2004 XQ_{196}	—	December 24, 2017	Haleakala	Pan-STARRS 1	JUN	970 m	MPC · JPL
740933	2004 XB_{197}	—	February 3, 2016	Haleakala	Pan-STARRS 1	EOS	1.5 km	MPC · JPL
740934	2004 XK_{198}	—	December 8, 2015	Haleakala	Pan-STARRS 1	·	880 m	MPC · JPL
740935	2004 XE_{199}	—	December 12, 2004	Kitt Peak	Spacewatch	·	880 m	MPC · JPL
740936	2004 YS_{15}	—	December 19, 2004	Mount Lemmon	Mount Lemmon Survey	EOS	1.5 km	MPC · JPL
740937	2004 YN_{24}	—	December 16, 2004	Kitt Peak	Spacewatch	·	870 m	MPC · JPL
740938	2004 YB_{28}	—	December 2, 2004	Kitt Peak	Spacewatch	·	590 m	MPC · JPL
740939	2004 YX_{29}	—	December 16, 2004	Kitt Peak	Spacewatch	MAR	830 m	MPC · JPL
740940	2004 YM_{38}	—	December 16, 2004	Kitt Peak	Spacewatch	·	490 m	MPC · JPL
740941	2004 YL_{39}	—	December 16, 2004	Catalina	CSS	·	1.0 km	MPC · JPL
740942	2004 YP_{41}	—	December 18, 2004	Mount Lemmon	Mount Lemmon Survey	·	1.1 km	MPC · JPL
740943	2005 AW_{84}	—	January 18, 2016	Haleakala	Pan-STARRS 1	·	2.1 km	MPC · JPL
740944	2005 BF_{1}	—	January 16, 2005	Socorro	LINEAR	·	1.6 km	MPC · JPL
740945	2005 BY_{14}	—	January 16, 2005	Kitt Peak	Spacewatch	·	2.4 km	MPC · JPL
740946	2005 BY_{15}	—	January 16, 2005	Kitt Peak	Spacewatch	·	1.1 km	MPC · JPL
740947	2005 BF_{31}	—	January 17, 2005	Socorro	LINEAR	·	1.6 km	MPC · JPL
740948	2005 BX_{33}	—	January 16, 2005	Mauna Kea	Veillet, C.	·	800 m	MPC · JPL
740949	2005 BB_{40}	—	January 15, 2005	Kitt Peak	Spacewatch	(5)	840 m	MPC · JPL
740950	2005 BG_{50}	—	August 25, 2012	Kitt Peak	Spacewatch	·	1.5 km	MPC · JPL
740951	2005 BV_{50}	—	November 29, 2014	Haleakala	Pan-STARRS 1	·	620 m	MPC · JPL
740952	2005 BH_{51}	—	November 20, 2008	Kitt Peak	Spacewatch	(5)	1.1 km	MPC · JPL
740953	2005 BD_{52}	—	October 21, 2012	Haleakala	Pan-STARRS 1	(5)	1.0 km	MPC · JPL
740954	2005 BV_{52}	—	January 17, 2005	Kitt Peak	Spacewatch	RAF	680 m	MPC · JPL
740955	2005 BH_{53}	—	January 16, 2005	Kitt Peak	Spacewatch	ADE	1.3 km	MPC · JPL
740956	2005 BY_{53}	—	September 22, 2008	Kitt Peak	Spacewatch	KOR	1.4 km	MPC · JPL
740957	2005 BU_{54}	—	January 4, 2016	Haleakala	Pan-STARRS 1	·	3.2 km	MPC · JPL
740958	2005 BG_{55}	—	January 17, 2005	Kitt Peak	Spacewatch	·	740 m	MPC · JPL
740959	2005 BP_{55}	—	December 1, 2014	Haleakala	Pan-STARRS 1	H	520 m	MPC · JPL
740960	2005 BQ_{55}	—	February 9, 2016	Haleakala	Pan-STARRS 1	EOS	1.5 km	MPC · JPL
740961	2005 BT_{55}	—	December 15, 2014	Mount Lemmon	Mount Lemmon Survey	·	1.4 km	MPC · JPL
740962	2005 BP_{57}	—	January 16, 2005	Kitt Peak	Spacewatch	L5	8.3 km	MPC · JPL
740963	2005 CD_{7}	—	January 18, 2005	Catalina	CSS	·	1.1 km	MPC · JPL
740964	2005 CX_{38}	—	September 26, 1995	Kitt Peak	Spacewatch	(5)	1.3 km	MPC · JPL
740965	2005 CW_{44}	—	February 2, 2005	Kitt Peak	Spacewatch	·	1.1 km	MPC · JPL
740966	2005 CY_{53}	—	September 27, 2016	Mount Lemmon	Mount Lemmon Survey	EUN	880 m	MPC · JPL
740967	2005 CD_{56}	—	February 4, 2005	Mount Lemmon	Mount Lemmon Survey	·	2.9 km	MPC · JPL
740968	2005 CS_{82}	—	December 2, 2008	Catalina	CSS	·	1.5 km	MPC · JPL
740969	2005 CN_{83}	—	February 14, 2005	Kitt Peak	Spacewatch	·	700 m	MPC · JPL
740970	2005 CP_{83}	—	December 22, 2008	Mount Lemmon	Mount Lemmon Survey	·	880 m	MPC · JPL
740971	2005 CD_{84}	—	July 11, 2016	Haleakala	Pan-STARRS 1	·	1.4 km	MPC · JPL
740972	2005 CL_{87}	—	April 15, 2016	Haleakala	Pan-STARRS 1	EOS	1.7 km	MPC · JPL
740973	2005 DT_{3}	—	February 18, 2005	La Silla	A. Boattini	·	890 m	MPC · JPL
740974	2005 EP_{3}	—	March 1, 2005	Kitt Peak	Spacewatch	·	1.3 km	MPC · JPL
740975	2005 EE_{11}	—	January 15, 2005	Catalina	CSS	·	1.8 km	MPC · JPL
740976	2005 EB_{14}	—	February 9, 2005	Socorro	LINEAR	PHO	880 m	MPC · JPL
740977	2005 EG_{29}	—	March 3, 2005	Catalina	CSS	·	2.3 km	MPC · JPL
740978	2005 EJ_{39}	—	February 9, 2005	Kitt Peak	Spacewatch	·	1.5 km	MPC · JPL
740979	2005 ER_{39}	—	January 16, 2005	Kitt Peak	Spacewatch	·	1.3 km	MPC · JPL
740980	2005 EA_{59}	—	February 2, 2005	Kitt Peak	Spacewatch	·	960 m	MPC · JPL
740981	2005 EV_{93}	—	March 8, 2005	Mount Lemmon	Mount Lemmon Survey	·	1.4 km	MPC · JPL
740982	2005 EH_{135}	—	March 9, 2005	Mount Lemmon	Mount Lemmon Survey	·	2.3 km	MPC · JPL
740983	2005 EM_{136}	—	March 1, 2005	Kitt Peak	Spacewatch	·	2.1 km	MPC · JPL
740984	2005 EM_{144}	—	March 10, 2005	Mount Lemmon	Mount Lemmon Survey	·	2.3 km	MPC · JPL
740985	2005 EO_{144}	—	March 3, 2005	Kitt Peak	Spacewatch	·	1.2 km	MPC · JPL
740986	2005 EN_{151}	—	March 10, 2005	Kitt Peak	Spacewatch	·	2.8 km	MPC · JPL
740987	2005 EU_{161}	—	March 9, 2005	Mount Lemmon	Mount Lemmon Survey	·	2.2 km	MPC · JPL
740988	2005 EY_{173}	—	March 8, 2005	Kitt Peak	Spacewatch	·	1.2 km	MPC · JPL
740989	2005 ES_{184}	—	March 9, 2005	Kitt Peak	Spacewatch	·	1.5 km	MPC · JPL
740990	2005 EV_{186}	—	March 10, 2005	Mount Lemmon	Mount Lemmon Survey	·	2.5 km	MPC · JPL
740991	2005 EG_{199}	—	March 11, 2005	Mount Lemmon	Mount Lemmon Survey	MIS	2.1 km	MPC · JPL
740992	2005 EZ_{199}	—	March 12, 2005	Mount Lemmon	Mount Lemmon Survey	·	1.6 km	MPC · JPL
740993	2005 EL_{201}	—	March 8, 2005	Catalina	CSS	PHO	990 m	MPC · JPL
740994	2005 EU_{226}	—	March 9, 2005	Mount Lemmon	Mount Lemmon Survey	URS	2.2 km	MPC · JPL
740995	2005 EX_{236}	—	March 11, 2005	Kitt Peak	Spacewatch	HNS	960 m	MPC · JPL
740996	2005 EJ_{237}	—	March 11, 2005	Kitt Peak	Spacewatch	·	790 m	MPC · JPL
740997	2005 EB_{238}	—	March 11, 2005	Kitt Peak	Spacewatch	·	2.0 km	MPC · JPL
740998	2005 ER_{246}	—	March 3, 2005	Nogales	J.-C. Merlin	·	1.1 km	MPC · JPL
740999	2005 EE_{268}	—	March 14, 2005	Mount Lemmon	Mount Lemmon Survey	·	2.8 km	MPC · JPL
741000	2005 EC_{275}	—	March 8, 2005	Kitt Peak	Spacewatch	·	1.5 km	MPC · JPL

back to top

== Meaning of names ==
As minor planet discoveries are confirmed, they are given a permanent number by the IAU's Minor Planet Center (MPC), and the discoverers can then submit names for them, following the IAU's naming conventions. The list below concerns those minor planets in the specified number-range that have received names, and explains the meanings of those names.

Official naming citations of newly named small Solar System bodies are approved and published in a bulletin by IAU's Working Group for Small Bodies Nomenclature (WGSBN). Before May 2021, citations were published in MPC's Minor Planet Circulars for many decades. Recent citations can also be found on the JPL Small-Body Database (SBDB). Until his death in 2016, German astronomer Lutz D. Schmadel compiled these citations into the Dictionary of Minor Planet Names (DMP) and regularly updated the collection.

Based on Paul Herget's The Names of the Minor Planets, Schmadel also researched the unclear origin of numerous asteroids, most of which had been named prior to World War II. This article incorporates text from this source, which is in the public domain: SBDB New namings may only be added to this list below after official publication as the preannouncement of names is condemned. The WGSBN publishes a comprehensive guideline for the naming rules of non-cometary small Solar System bodies.

Named minor planet	Provisional	This minor planet was named for...	Ref · Catalog
740495 Langill	2003 QF_{116}	Philip Langill (born 1961), Canadian associate professor of astronomy and physics at the University of Calgary and the director of the Rothney Astrophysical Observatory (RAO).	IAU · 740495
