= (91205) 1998 US43 =

Plutino

(91205) 1998 US_{43}
Discovery
- Discovered by: M. W. Buie
- Discovery site: Kitt Peak National Obs.
- Discovery date: 22 October 1998

Designations
- Minor planet category: TNO · plutino distant

Orbital characteristics
- Epoch 27 April 2019 (JD 2458600.5)
- Uncertainty parameter 4
- Observation arc: 17.29 yr (6,314 d)
- Aphelion: 44.196 AU
- Perihelion: 33.932 AU
- Semi-major axis: 39.064 AU
- Eccentricity: 0.1314
- Orbital period (sidereal): 244.16 yr (89,179 d)
- Mean anomaly: 66.411°
- Mean motion: 0° 0^{m} 14.4^{s} / day
- Inclination: 10.628°
- Longitude of ascending node: 223.94°
- Argument of perihelion: 138.70°

Physical characteristics
- Mean diameter: 111 km (est.); 154 km (est.)
- Geometric albedo: 0.04 (assumed); 0.09 (assumed)
- Spectral type: BB–BR; B–R = 1.185; B–V = 0.691; R–I = 0.323; V–R = 0.494
- Absolute magnitude (H): 8.0

(91205) 1998 US_{43} is a resonant trans-Neptunian object of the plutino group, located in the Kuiper belt in the outermost region of the Solar System. The rather bluish body measures approximately 111 kilometers (69 miles) in diameter. It was discovered on 22 October 1998, by American astronomer Marc Buie at the Kitt Peak National Observatory in the United States.

== Classification and orbit ==
1998 US_{43} belongs to the plutino population, a large population of resonant trans-Neptunian objects named after the group's largest member, Pluto. Thus, 1998 US_{43} is in a 2:3 orbital resonance with Neptune, orbiting the Sun twice for every three times Neptune does.

It orbits the Sun with a semi-major axis of 39.06 AU, a perihelion of 33.9 AU, and an aphelion of 44.2 AU, completing an orbit once every 244 years and 2 months (89,179 days). Its orbit has an eccentricity of 0.13 and an inclination of 11° with respect to the ecliptic. The body's observation arc begins with its official discovery observation. Its orbit still has a fair amount of uncertainty.

== Numbering and naming ==
This minor planet was numbered by the Minor Planet Center on 28 October 2004 (M.P.C. 52912). As of 2025, it has not been named.

== Physical characteristics ==
Based on an absolute magnitude of 8.0 and an assumed albedo of 0.09, Johnston's Archive estimates a diameter of 111 kilometers. The body's spectrum (BB–BR) suggests a somewhat bluish color. As of 2018, no rotational lightcurve of 1998 US_{43} has been obtained from photometric observations. 1998 US_{43} is an unlikely dwarf planet candidate due to its small size, estimated by Michael Brown to measure 154 kilometers with a low albedo of 0.04.
