= Marc Buie =

American astronomer

Marc William Buie
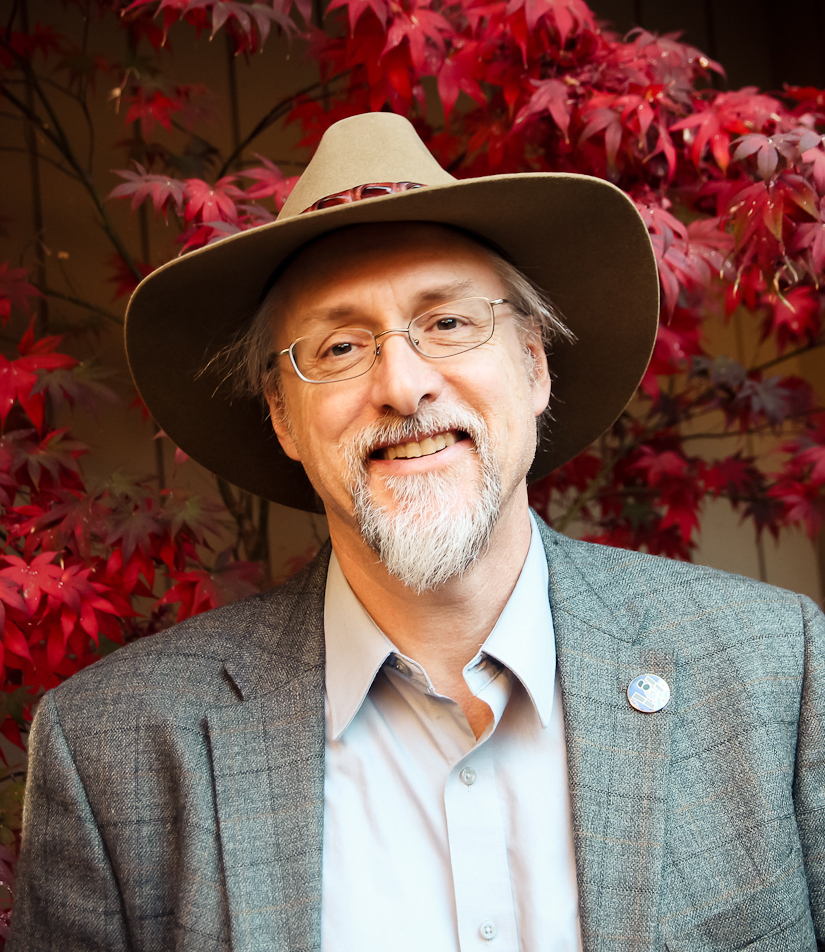
- Buie in 2013
- Born: September 17, 1958 (age 67)
- Education: University of Arizona; Louisiana State University
- Scientific career
- Fields: Astronomy
- Institutions: Southwest Research Institute (2008–present); Lowell Observatory (1991–2008); Space Telescope Science Institute (1988–1991)

Marc William Buie (/ˈbuːi/; born September 17, 1958) is an American astronomer and prolific discoverer of minor planets who works at the Southwest Research Institute in Boulder, Colorado in the Space Science Department. Formerly he worked at the Lowell Observatory in Flagstaff, Arizona, and was the Sentinel Space Telescope Mission Scientist for the B612 Foundation, which is dedicated to protecting Earth from asteroid impact events.

Minor planets discovered: 941
see § List of discovered minor planets

== Early life and education ==
Buie grew up in Baton Rouge, Louisiana, and received his B.Sc. in physics from Louisiana State University in 1980. He then switched fields and earned his Ph.D. in Planetary Science from the University of Arizona in 1984. Buie was a post-doctoral fellow at the University of Hawaiʻi from 1985 to 1988. From 1988 to 1991, he worked at the Space Telescope Science Institute where he played a key role in the planning and scheduling of the first planetary observations ever made by the Hubble Space Telescope. Buie joined the staff at Lowell Observatory in 1991.

== Career ==
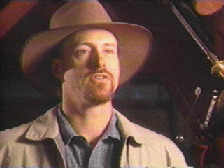
Buie in 1995 at the Lowell Observatory

Since 1983, Pluto has been a central theme of research done by Buie, who as of 2014 has published over 85 scientific papers and journal articles. His first result was to prove that the methane visible on Pluto was on its surface and not part of its atmosphere. Since then he has worked on albedo maps of the surface, composition maps of Pluto and Charon, refinement of the orbits of Charon in addition to the much more recently discovered satellites, measurements of the structure of the atmosphere, and other measurements of the properties of the surfaces of Pluto and Charon. He is also one of the co-discoverers of Pluto's moons, Nix and Hydra.

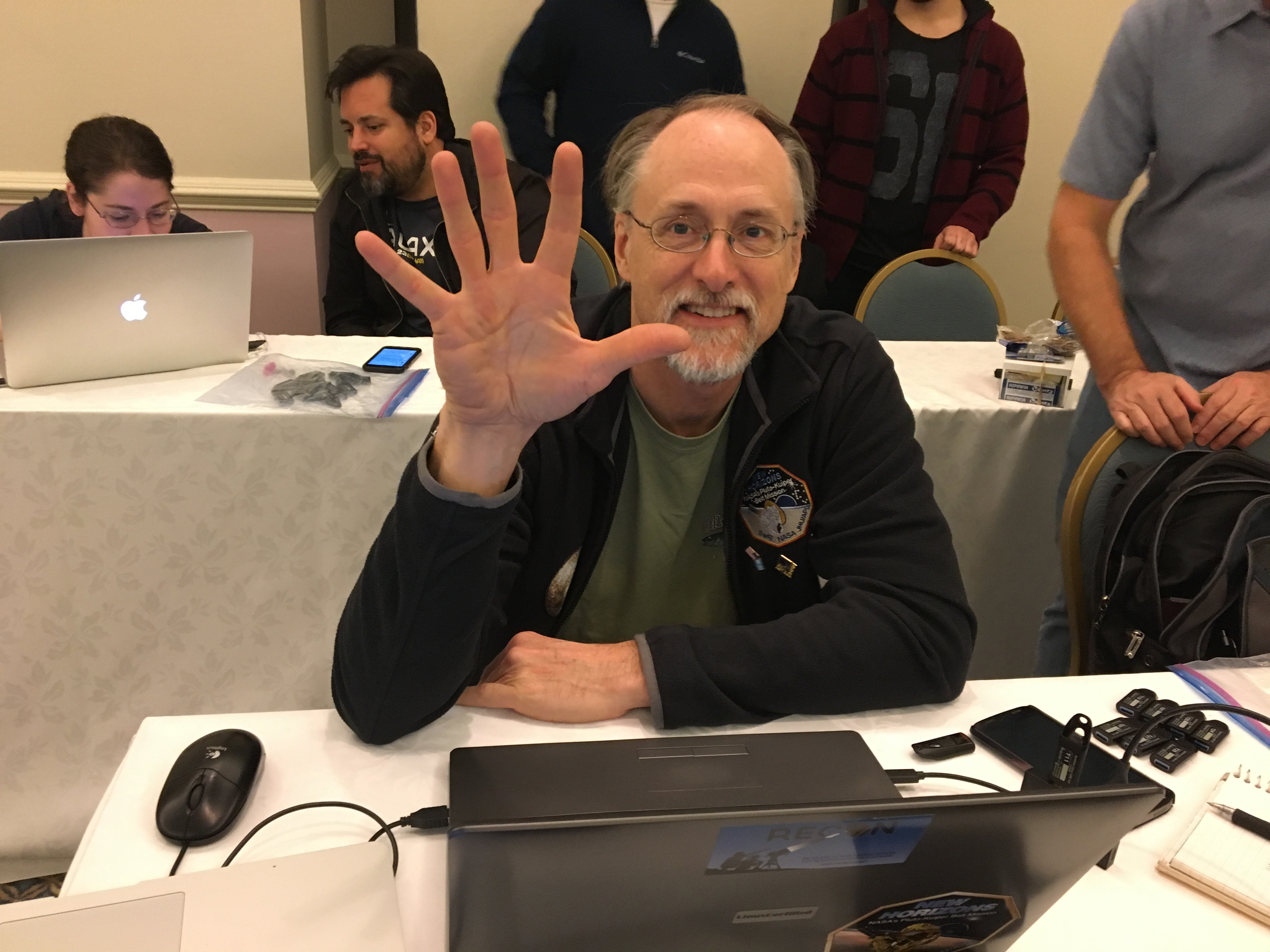
Buie in July 2017 leading the occultation campaign to observe 486958 Arrokoth before the New Horizons fly-by of the Kuiper belt object in January 2019.

He has been working with the Deep Ecliptic Survey team who have been responsible for the discovery of over 1,000 Kuiper belt objects (KBOs). Beyond the work of just locating these objects, he additionally seeks to develop a better picture of the structure and nature of them. A spin-off project from this endeavor was his participation in the project to locate a Kuiper belt object that was within the range of NASA's New Horizons mission after it passed by Pluto. This search led to the discovery of over 50 new KBOs, including 486958 Arrokoth, the object that New Horizons would eventually perform a close fly-by of on 1 January 2019. In the lead up to the fly-by, Buie also led a successful occultation campaign in Argentina and South Africa to observe Arrokoth as it passed in front of a distant star to refine the estimates of its size, shape, and orbit. Jim Green, NASA's director of planetary science at the time, called the effort "the most historic occultation on the face of the Earth."

In addition to his research into all aspects of Pluto and the Kuiper belt, Buie also works on studying transitional objects like 2060 Chiron and 5145 Pholus and occasionally comets, such as the recent Deep impact mission that went to Comet Tempel 1. In an effort closer to home, he also studies near-Earth asteroids to try to understand more about these potentially dangerous solar system neighbors. Most of these research efforts involve the use of Lowell Observatory telescopes in addition to occasional use of the Hubble and Spitzer Space Telescopes. He is also active in the development of state-of-the-art astronomical instrumentation having just completed the construction of an infrared imaging spectrograph, Mimir, in collaboration with Dan Clemens of Boston University.

Buie is a member of the American Astronomical Society (AAS) and its Division for Planetary Sciences (DPS), the American Geophysical Union (AGU), the International Astronomical Union (IAU), and the International Dark-Sky Association.

The inner main-belt asteroid 7553 Buie was named in the astronomer's honor on 28 July 1999 (M.P.C. 35486). He is also profiled as part of an article on Pluto in Air & Space Smithsonian magazine.

== List of discovered minor planets ==
9116 Billhamilton	7 March 1997	list
11670 Fountain	6 January 1998	list
20234 Billgibson	6 January 1998	list
28513 Guo	5 February 2000	list
31203 Hersman	6 January 1998	list
32263 Kusnierkiewicz	31 July 2000	list
34077 Yoshiakifuse	30 July 2000	list
36444 Clairblackburn	1 August 2000	list
36983 Sumner	21 September 2000	list
(38084) 1999 HB_{12}	18 April 1999	list^{[A]}
43574 Joyharjo	26 March 2001	list
56795 Amandagorman	31 July 2000	list
(60454) 2000 CH_{105}	5 February 2000	list
(60455) 2000 CY_{106}	5 February 2000	list
(60458) 2000 CM_{114}	5 February 2000	list
(61337) 2000 OE_{68}	29 July 2000	list
(61911) 2000 QP_{244}	25 August 2000	list
(63361) 2001 FR_{171}	24 March 2001	list
63363 Guengerich	25 March 2001	list
(65191) 2002 CR_{257}	6 February 2002	list
65885 Lubenow	27 December 1997	list
(68324) 2001 FX_{182}	25 March 2001	list
(68423) 2001 QD_{315}	20 August 2001	list
(68716) 2002 CX_{280}	8 February 2002	list
(69986) 1998 WW_{24}	18 November 1998	list

(69987) 1998 WA_{25}	19 November 1998	list
(69988) 1998 WA_{31}	18 November 1998	list
(69990) 1998 WU_{31}	18 November 1998	list
72801 Manzanera	25 March 2001	list
72802 Wetton	26 March 2001	list
78867 Isakowitz	23 August 2003	list
(80806) 2000 CM_{105}	6 February 2000	list
81947 Fripp	31 July 2000	list
81948 Eno	31 July 2000	list
(82157) 2001 FM_{185}	26 March 2001	list
(82158) 2001 FP185	26 March 2001	list
(84798) 2002 XJ_{92}	4 December 2002	list
(87270) 2000 OR_{69}	31 July 2000	list
87933 Bernardschmitt	21 September 2000	list
(88267) 2001 KE_{76}	22 May 2001	list
(88268) 2001 KK_{76}	24 May 2001	list
(88269) 2001 KF_{77}	22 May 2001	list
88270 Alanhoward	24 May 2001	list
(91205) 1998 US43	22 October 1998	list
(92278) 2000 CB_{110}	5 February 2000	list
92579 Dwight	31 July 2000	list
92892 Robertlawrence	25 August 2000	list
92894 Bluford	28 August 2000	list
95449 Frederickgregory	7 February 2002	list
(95625) 2002 GX32	8 April 2002	list^{[B]}^{[C]}

97508 Bolden	6 February 2000	list
97512 Jemison	5 February 2000	list
103733 Bernardharris	5 February 2000	list
103734 Winstonscott	5 February 2000	list
103737 Curbeam	5 February 2000	list
103738 Stephaniewilson	5 February 2000	list
103739 Higginbotham	6 February 2000	list
104698 Alvindrew	10 April 2000	list
105222 Oscarsaa	31 July 2000	list
108096 Melvin	25 March 2001	list
108097 Satcher	26 March 2001	list
114705 Tamayo	30 March 2003	list
115015 Chang Díaz	24 August 2003	list
116162 Sidneygutierrez	20 November 2003	list
117703 Ochoa	11 March 2005	list
117704 Lopez-Alegria	12 March 2005	list
(118702) 2000 OM_{67}	31 July 2000	list^{[D]}
118768 Carlosnoriega	25 August 2000	list
118769 Olivas	28 August 2000	list
(119066) 2001 KJ_{76}	23 May 2001	list
(119067) 2001 KP_{76}	23 May 2001	list
(119068) 2001 KC_{77}	23 May 2001	list
(119069) 2001 KN_{77}	23 May 2001	list
(119070) 2001 KP77	23 May 2001	list
(119473) 2001 UO_{18}	19 October 2001	list

(119878) 2002 CY_{224}	7 February 2002	list
119890 Zamka	6 February 2002	list
(119956) 2002 PA_{149}	10 August 2002	list
(119976) 2002 VR_{130}	7 November 2002	list
119993 Acabá	5 December 2002	list
(120181) 2003 UR_{292}	24 October 2003	list
122554 Joséhernández	25 August 2000	list
122555 Auñón-Chancellor	28 August 2000	list
(126619) 2002 CX_{154}	6 February 2002	list
(126719) 2002 CC_{249}	8 February 2002	list
126965 Neri	18 March 2002	list
127030 Herrington	6 April 2002	list
(127546) 2002 XU93	4 December 2002	list
(127871) 2003 FC_{128}	31 March 2003	list
128038 Jimadams	30 May 2003	list
129564 Christy	7 March 1997	list
132329 Tomandert	7 April 2002	list
132791 Jeremybauman	11 August 2002	list
133066 Beddingfield	30 March 2003	list
(133067) 2003 FB_{128}	30 March 2003	list
(134860) 2000 OJ_{67}	29 July 2000	list^{[D]}
(135024) 2001 KO_{76}	23 May 2001	list
(135182) 2001 QT_{322}	21 August 2001	list
(135571) 2002 GG_{32}	8 April 2002	list
(136120) 2003 LG_{7}	1 June 2003	list

136197 Johnandrews	22 October 2003	list
136922 Brianbauer	19 April 1998	list
138016 Kerribeisser	6 February 2000	list
(138537) 2000 OK_{67}	29 July 2000	list^{[D]}
138626 Tanguybertrand	28 August 2000	list
(138628) 2000 QM_{251}	25 August 2000	list
(139775) 2001 QG298	19 August 2001	list
(139776) 2001 QS_{309}	19 August 2001	list
(139777) 2001 QS_{317}	20 August 2001	list
141995 Rossbeyer	12 August 2002	list
(143205) 2002 XQ_{92}	5 December 2002	list
(143206) 2002 XS_{92}	5 December 2002	list
143750 Shyamkumar	23 October 2003	list
(143751) 2003 US_{292}	24 October 2003	list
(144383) 2004 DK_{65}	22 February 2004	list
(144385) 2004 DJ_{69}	26 February 2004	list
144386 Emmabirath	27 February 2004	list
146040 Alicebowman	27 February 2000	list
146442 Dwaynebrown	20 August 2001	list
146921 Michaelbuckley	6 February 2002	list
(147256) 2002 XN_{91}	4 December 2002	list
(147257) 2002 XO_{91}	4 December 2002	list
147703 Madras	10 April 2005	list
147704 Gartenberg	11 April 2005	list
(148209) 2000 CR105	6 February 2000	list

148342 Carverbierson	27 August 2000	list
149113 Stewartbushman	6 February 2002	list
149115 Lauriecantillo	8 February 2002	list
149157 Stephencarr	20 March 2002	list
149163 Stevenconard	7 April 2002	list
(149348) 2002 VS_{130}	7 November 2002	list
(149349) 2002 VA_{131}	9 November 2002	list
(149560) 2003 QZ_{91}	24 August 2003	list
150046 Cynthiaconrad	1 December 2005	list
150374 Jasoncook	5 February 2000	list
(150509) 2000 QK_{237}	27 August 2000	list
(150510) 2000 QQ_{247}	28 August 2000	list
151349 Stanleycooper	8 February 2002	list
151351 Dalleore	8 February 2002	list
152067 Deboy	15 August 2004	list
153301 Alissamearle	25 March 2001	list
(153456) 2001 QC_{304}	19 August 2001	list
(153457) 2001 QX_{310}	19 August 2001	list
154554 Heatherelliott	1 April 2003	list
154587 Ennico	30 May 2003	list
155784 Ercol	19 September 2000	list
(155902) 2001 FA_{184}	25 March 2001	list
(155903) 2001 FN_{184}	26 March 2001	list
156751 Chelseaferrell	4 December 2002	list
158472 Tiffanyfinley	8 February 2002	list

159102 Sarahflanigan	11 October 2004	list
159902 Gladstone	11 October 2004	list
159999 Michaelgriffin	2 March 2006	list
(160091) 2000 OL_{67}	29 July 2000	list^{[D]}
(160147) 2001 KN_{76}	22 May 2001	list
(160148) 2001 KV_{76}	24 May 2001	list
160215 Haines-Stiles	8 February 2002	list
(160256) 2002 PD_{149}	10 August 2002	list
161585 Danielhals	10 April 2005	list
161592 Sarahhamilton	10 August 2005	list
161699 Lisahardaway	26 April 2006	list
162395 Michaelbird	5 February 2000	list
(162396) 2000 CV_{120}	5 February 2000	list
162978 Helenhart	19 August 2001	list
163244 Matthewhill	18 March 2002	list
163255 Adrianhill	6 April 2002	list
164536 Davehinson	27 April 2006	list
164701 Horanyi	7 January 1998	list
(167336) 2003 UA_{289}	23 October 2003	list
(167337) 2003 UY_{289}	23 October 2003	list
167971 Carlyhowett	11 March 2005	list
168221 Donjennings	1 May 2006	list
168531 Joshuakammer	10 November 1999	list
168635 Davidkaufmann	5 February 2000	list
168767 Kochte	25 August 2000	list

(169071) 2001 FR_{185}	26 March 2001	list
169184 Jameslee	19 August 2001	list
169509 Jeffreyrobbins	7 February 2002	list
170073 Ivanlinscott	9 November 2002	list
(170272) 2003 QC_{84}	24 August 2003	list
(170273) 2003 QO_{84}	24 August 2003	list
170487 Mallder	22 October 2003	list
(171337) 2006 JE_{59}	1 May 2006	list
(171338) 2006 JZ_{60}	2 May 2006	list
171624 Nicolemartin	5 February 2000	list
172090 Davidmccomas	6 February 2002	list
172191 Ralphmcnutt	10 August 2002	list
172951 Mehoke	11 May 2005	list
172985 Ericmelin	27 April 2006	list
173649 Jeffreymoore	26 March 2001	list
175238 Nguyenhien	12 April 2005	list
175920 Francisnimmo	5 February 2000	list
176610 Nuñez	18 March 2002	list
177120 Ocampo Uría	1 April 2003	list
177148 Pätzold	24 August 2003	list
177722 Pelletier	11 April 2005	list
178603 Pinkine	5 February 2000	list
178679 Piquette	28 August 2000	list
178987 Jillianredfern	19 August 2001	list
179647 Stuartrobbins	10 August 2002	list

180143 Gaberogers	30 March 2003	list
180855 Debrarose	11 April 2005	list
181562 Paulrosendall	20 October 2006	list
(181855) 1998 WT_{31}	18 November 1998	list
182044 Ryschkewitsch	5 February 2000	list
182122 Sepan	26 August 2000	list
(182294) 2001 KU76	24 May 2001	list
(182397) 2001 QW_{297}	20 August 2001	list
(182933) 2002 GZ_{31}	6 April 2002	list
(182934) 2002 GJ_{32}	8 April 2002	list
183357 Rickshelton	9 November 2002	list
(183398) 2002 XS_{91}	4 December 2002	list
(183399) 2002 XQ_{93}	6 December 2002	list
(183963) 2004 DJ_{64}	26 February 2004	list
(183964) 2004 DJ_{71}	26 February 2004	list
(184212) 2004 PB112	13 August 2004	list
184314 Mbabamwanawaresa	11 March 2005	list
184315 Denisbogan	10 March 2005	list
(185310) 2006 UE_{321}	19 October 2006	list
185312 Yvonnemarschall	20 October 2006	list
186411 Margaretsimon	10 August 2002	list
(187463) 2005 XX_{106}	1 December 2005	list
187981 Soluri	19 August 2001	list
188139 Stanbridge	6 February 2002	list
188256 Stothoff	7 December 2002	list

188502 Darrellstrobel	12 August 2004	list
189035 Michaelsummers	5 February 2000	list
189312 Jameyszalay	1 May 2006	list
190710 Marktapley	26 March 2001	list
192001 Raynatedford	2 December 2005	list
193736 Henrythroop	25 March 2001	list
(195177) 2002 CE_{250}	6 February 2002	list
(195180) 2002 CL_{263}	6 February 2002	list
(195182) 2002 CX_{263}	7 February 2002	list
(195185) 2002 CM_{269}	7 February 2002	list
(195187) 2002 CO_{273}	8 February 2002	list
(195189) 2002 CD_{274}	8 February 2002	list
195191 Constantinetsang	8 February 2002	list
195405 Lentyler	6 April 2002	list
195777 Sheepman	12 August 2002	list^{[E]}
196411 Umurhan	1 April 2003	list
(197176) 2003 UE_{286}	22 October 2003	list
(197177) 2003 UJ_{287}	22 October 2003	list
(197340) 2003 WG_{178}	20 November 2003	list
(197341) 2003 WU_{181}	21 November 2003	list
197525 Versteeg	22 February 2004	list
197845 Michaelvincent	14 August 2004	list
(198832) 2005 EY_{295}	9 March 2005	list
(198833) 2005 EB_{315}	11 March 2005	list
(198847) 2005 GO_{189}	12 April 2005	list

(198848) 2005 GK_{196}	10 April 2005	list
(199084) 2005 XN_{104}	1 December 2005	list
(199085) 2005 XO_{104}	1 December 2005	list
199574 Webbert	2 March 2006	list
199741 Weidner	26 April 2006	list
200255 Weigle	10 November 1999	list
201019 Oliverwhite	6 February 2002	list
201023 Karlwhittenburg	8 February 2002	list
201204 Stevewilliams	10 August 2002	list
201935 Robertbraun	26 February 2004	list
(204566) 2005 EL_{299}	11 March 2005	list
(204567) 2005 ER_{304}	11 March 2005	list
204570 Veronicabray	12 March 2005	list
204602 Lawrencebrown	11 April 2005	list
204632 Jamesburch	1 December 2005	list
204764 Lindaburke	1 May 2006	list
205823 Michaeldavis	8 February 2002	list
206015 Carlengelbrecht	9 August 2002	list
207013 Fischetti	11 October 2004	list
207394 Rickfitzgerald	1 December 2005	list
208117 Davidgerdes	6 February 2000	list
208196 Matthiashahn	27 August 2000	list
(208970) 2002 XR_{91}	4 December 2002	list
(208971) 2002 XP_{92}	5 December 2002	list
209075 Kathleenharmon	23 August 2003	list

209206 Richardhenry	23 October 2003	list
(209773) 2005 EV_{298}	11 March 2005	list
(209774) 2005 EW_{317}	12 March 2005	list
209883 Jasonhofgartner	10 May 2005	list
210854 Stevejaskulek	20 August 2001	list
210874 Perijohnson	12 September 2001	list
211077 Hongkang	8 February 2002	list
211232 Kellykevin	9 August 2002	list
(212151) 2005 EP_{312}	10 March 2005	list
(212152) 2005 EA_{314}	10 March 2005	list
(212153) 2005 EV_{317}	12 March 2005	list
212215 Mallorykinczyk	10 April 2005	list
212392 Peterkollmann	26 April 2006	list
212403 Marthakusterer	1 May 2006	list
213197 Lessac-Chenen	20 September 2000	list
214290 Leeannmarshall	12 April 2005	list
215685 Cherylalexander	21 November 2003	list
215884 Jayantmurthy	9 March 2005	list
215905 Andrewpoppe	10 April 2005	list
216752 Kirbyrunyon	10 August 2005	list
217124 Michaelsalinas	6 February 2002	list
217492 Howardtaylor	28 April 2006	list
218069 Lisaturner	18 March 2002	list
218570 Jonvandegriff	10 April 2005	list
(219139) 1998 WM_{24}	18 November 1998	list

219286 Helenewinters	5 February 2000	list
219861 Robertdecker	6 February 2002	list
220331 Stevenarnold	30 March 2003	list
220346 Nedabehrooz	1 April 2003	list
220444 Pontusbrandt	23 November 2003	list
221566 Omarcustodio	20 October 2006	list
(222056) 1998 WK_{24}	18 November 1998	list
222812 Priyadharmavaram	7 February 2002	list
222903 Rajanidhingra	6 April 2002	list
223263 Cheikhoumardia	30 March 2003	list
223278 Brianduncan	1 April 2003	list
223339 Gregdunn	26 August 2003	list
223879 Anthonyegan	18 October 2004	list
223912 Jacobeisig	9 November 2004	list
224591 Fattig	1 December 2005	list
(225359) 1998 WJ_{24}	18 November 1998	list
225438 Jacobfirer	5 February 2000	list
225991 Françoisforget	7 February 2002	list
(226033) 2002 FR_{18}	18 March 2002	list
226356 Madelinefosbury	1 April 2003	list
(226408) 2003 QM_{81}	23 August 2003	list
(226409) 2003 QM_{85}	24 August 2003	list
(227504) 2005 XK_{104}	1 December 2005	list
(227505) 2005 XW_{105}	1 December 2005	list
(227506) 2005 XQ_{106}	1 December 2005	list

(227800) 2006 YN_{50}	21 December 2006	list
(228409) Bobjensen	26 March 2001	list
228633 Stevegribbin	6 February 2002	list
228980 Robertstrain	23 October 2003	list
229004 Josephhall	20 November 2003	list
229214 Magdasaina	9 November 2004	list
(229998) 2000 CG_{106}	5 February 2000	list
230434 Johnhanley	10 August 2002	list
230728 Tedstryk	22 October 2003	list
230759 Anishahosadurga	23 November 2003	list
231042 Johnhayes	9 March 2005	list
231379 Jonhandiboe	26 April 2006	list
231832 Briankeeney	31 July 2000	list
231841 Danielkatz	25 August 2000	list
231842 Graemekeleher	27 August 2000	list
232259 Georgelawrence	10 August 2002	list
232363 Jeanettethorn	4 December 2002	list
232868 Salmasylla	11 October 2004	list
233214 Gailoxton	1 December 2005	list
233459 Gregquicke	1 May 2006	list
(235080) 2003 GS_{51}	1 April 2003	list
(235081) 2003 GJ_{52}	1 April 2003	list
(235100) 2003 KH_{35}	30 May 2003	list
235145 Ericquirico	25 August 2003	list
235403 Alysenregiec	21 November 2003	list

235750 Leahroberson	11 October 2004	list
235985 Dougrodgers	12 March 2005	list
236232 Joshalbers	2 December 2005	list
236617 Loriglaze	1 May 2006	list
237397 Mccauleyrench	6 January 1998	list
239126 Tommygreathouse	27 April 2006	list
239254 Gabbigriffith	19 October 2006	list
240725 Scipioni	12 April 2005	list
(241091) 2006 UO_{296}	19 October 2006	list
(242117) 2002 VW_{135}	7 November 2002	list
(242294) 2003 UV_{289}	23 October 2003	list
(242619) 2005 JL_{174}	11 May 2005	list
(242773) 2005 XY_{109}	1 December 2005	list
(242774) 2005 XH_{110}	1 December 2005	list
(242775) 2005 XO_{111}	1 December 2005	list
(243031) 2006 UV_{295}	19 October 2006	list
(244263) 2002 CR_{282}	8 February 2002	list
(244320) 2002 GF_{177}	7 April 2002	list
(244880) 2003 UR_{285}	22 October 2003	list
(244925) 2003 WH_{183}	23 November 2003	list
(245023) 2004 DB_{69}	26 February 2004	list
(245401) 2005 GO_{184}	10 April 2005	list
(245402) 2005 GQ_{184}	10 April 2005	list
(245443) 2005 JP_{174}	11 May 2005	list
(245811) 2006 HF_{137}	26 April 2006	list

(245917) 2006 QS_{171}	22 August 2006	list
(247104) 2000 SY_{345}	21 September 2000	list
(247420) 2002 CZ_{261}	6 February 2002	list
(247666) 2002 XT_{92}	5 December 2002	list
(250678) 2005 PK_{23}	9 August 2005	list
(251743) 1998 WO_{24}	18 November 1998	list
(251744) 1998 WS_{24}	19 November 1998	list
(252032) 2000 OW_{63}	31 July 2000	list
(252044) 2000 QM_{240}	25 August 2000	list
(252290) 2001 QZ_{309}	19 August 2001	list
(253389) 2003 KQ_{25}	31 May 2003	list
(253791) 2003 WV_{181}	21 November 2003	list
(254561) 2005 EU_{296}	9 March 2005	list
(256115) 2006 UA_{295}	19 October 2006	list
(256116) 2006 UW_{297}	19 October 2006	list
(256392) 2006 YB_{50}	21 December 2006	list
(257772) 2000 CN_{109}	5 February 2000	list
(257773) 2000 CB_{111}	6 February 2000	list
(257861) 2000 QD_{242}	27 August 2000	list
(257862) 2000 QC_{248}	28 August 2000	list
(258608) 2002 CP_{271}	8 February 2002	list
(258620) 2002 CQ_{315}	6 February 2002	list
(258698) 2002 GO_{29}	7 April 2002	list
(259608) 2003 UW_{289}	23 October 2003	list
(259609) 2003 UN_{291}	24 October 2003	list

(259674) 2003 WG_{182}	22 November 2003	list
(260137) 2004 PL_{115}	12 August 2004	list
(260361) 2004 TO_{353}	11 October 2004	list
(260590) 2005 ER_{312}	10 March 2005	list
(260825) 2005 PD_{24}	9 August 2005	list
(261608) 2005 XD_{106}	1 December 2005	list
(261609) 2005 XH_{112}	2 December 2005	list
(262046) 2006 QD_{176}	22 August 2006	list
(262525) 2006 UV_{312}	19 October 2006	list
(262526) 2006 UD_{321}	19 October 2006	list
(262799) 2006 YD_{50}	21 December 2006	list
(262800) 2006 YK_{50}	21 December 2006	list
(264367) 2000 CZ_{104}	5 February 2000	list
(264368) 2000 CZ_{109}	5 February 2000	list
(264767) 2002 FY_{13}	18 March 2002	list
(265425) 2004 TO_{354}	11 October 2004	list
(265559) 2005 PM_{24}	10 August 2005	list
(265821) 2005 XZ_{110}	1 December 2005	list
(266043) 2006 HM_{129}	26 April 2006	list
(267479) 2002 GT_{29}	7 April 2002	list
(268278) 2005 PX_{23}	8 August 2005	list
(268725) 2006 HQ_{135}	26 April 2006	list
(268726) 2006 HV_{137}	26 April 2006	list
(269623) 2010 VA_{173}	18 November 1998	list
(269935) 2000 QY_{247}	28 August 2000	list

(270519) 2002 GN_{30}	7 April 2002	list
(270650) 2002 PA_{145}	9 August 2002	list
(271877) 2004 TE_{354}	11 October 2004	list
(271900) 2004 VS_{71}	10 November 2004	list
(272101) 2005 GE_{195}	10 April 2005	list
(272187) 2005 PP_{23}	8 August 2005	list
(272696) 2005 XF_{95}	1 December 2005	list
(272697) 2005 XX_{104}	1 December 2005	list
(272698) 2005 XP_{109}	1 December 2005	list
(273194) 2006 HY_{130}	26 April 2006	list
(273227) 2006 JB_{61}	2 May 2006	list
(273228) 2006 JW_{66}	1 May 2006	list
(273229) 2006 JY_{67}	1 May 2006	list
(273666) 2007 DE_{103}	21 February 2007	list
(275621) 2000 CK_{106}	5 February 2000	list
(275676) 2000 QY_{241}	27 August 2000	list
(275809) 2001 QY297	21 August 2001	list
(276079) 2002 CV_{263}	7 February 2002	list
(276672) 2003 WS_{179}	20 November 2003	list
(276673) 2003 WC_{187}	23 November 2003	list
(276980) 2004 VJ_{94}	10 November 2004	list
(277131) 2005 GR_{196}	10 April 2005	list
(277854) 2006 HR_{131}	26 April 2006	list
(277880) 2006 JB_{64}	1 May 2006	list
(277881) 2006 JC_{65}	1 May 2006	list

(277882) 2006 JA_{67}	1 May 2006	list
(279800) 2000 CC_{105}	5 February 2000	list
(280263) 2002 XR_{113}	7 December 2002	list
(280313) 2003 QA_{89}	26 August 2003	list
(280316) 2003 QW_{119}	26 August 2003	list
(280690) 2005 EQ_{317}	12 March 2005	list
(280727) 2005 GU_{192}	10 April 2005	list
(281021) 2006 EX_{68}	2 March 2006	list
(281050) 2006 HG_{124}	26 April 2006	list
(281051) 2006 HP_{124}	26 April 2006	list
(281056) 2006 JT_{63}	1 May 2006	list
(282355) 2003 FC_{124}	30 March 2003	list
(282627) 2005 PO_{24}	10 August 2005	list
(283477) 2001 QY_{305}	19 August 2001	list
(283628) 2002 CN_{273}	8 February 2002	list
(284416) 2006 UC_{309}	19 October 2006	list
(285615) 2000 QB_{233}	25 August 2000	list
(285616) 2000 QD_{247}	27 August 2000	list
(285732) 2000 SU_{345}	19 September 2000	list
285937 Anthonytaylor	20 August 2001	list
(286593) 2002 CL_{273}	8 February 2002	list
(286595) 2002 CU_{280}	8 February 2002	list
(286695) 2002 FL_{17}	18 March 2002	list
(286702) 2002 GP_{28}	6 April 2002	list
(286703) 2002 GJ_{31}	7 April 2002	list

(287714) 2003 QC_{90}	26 August 2003	list
(288175) 2003 WT_{179}	20 November 2003	list
(288176) 2003 WG_{180}	20 November 2003	list
(288421) 2004 DH_{70}	26 February 2004	list
289116 Zurbuchen	11 October 2004	list
(289575) 2005 EC_{312}	10 March 2005	list
(289576) 2005 ES_{312}	10 March 2005	list
(289577) 2005 EX_{315}	11 March 2005	list
(289578) 2005 ET_{317}	12 March 2005	list
(289701) 2005 GP_{205}	11 April 2005	list
(289702) 2005 GR_{206}	12 April 2005	list
(289812) 2005 JM_{171}	10 May 2005	list
(289813) 2005 JQ_{171}	10 May 2005	list
(290005) 2005 PG_{24}	10 August 2005	list
(291006) 2005 XY_{102}	1 December 2005	list
(291007) 2005 XE_{112}	2 December 2005	list
(291008) 2005 XK_{112}	2 December 2005	list
(291743) 2006 JM_{64}	1 May 2006	list
(292037) 2006 QN_{176}	22 August 2006	list
(292842) 2006 UD_{295}	19 October 2006	list
(292843) 2006 UC_{299}	19 October 2006	list
(292844) 2006 UY_{300}	19 October 2006	list
(292845) 2006 UX_{325}	20 October 2006	list
(297359) 2000 CL_{106}	5 February 2000	list
(297360) 2000 CH_{119}	6 February 2000	list

(297406) 2000 QF_{245}	25 August 2000	list
(297905) 2002 CT_{280}	8 February 2002	list
(298033) 2002 PC_{152}	10 August 2002	list
(298342) 2003 GM_{52}	1 April 2003	list
(298495) 2003 UB_{287}	22 October 2003	list
(298691) 2004 DY_{67}	26 February 2004	list
(298956) 2004 TX_{353}	11 October 2004	list
(299153) 2005 EX_{298}	11 March 2005	list
(299199) 2005 GN_{206}	12 April 2005	list
(299400) 2005 XR_{110}	1 December 2005	list
(299629) 2006 JD_{61}	2 May 2006	list
(299630) 2006 JF_{68}	1 May 2006	list
(301989) 2000 OL_{61}	29 July 2000	list
(301990) 2000 OA_{62}	30 July 2000	list
(302474) 2002 FY_{18}	18 March 2002	list
(303021) 2003 WK_{178}	20 November 2003	list
(303148) 2004 DD_{69}	26 February 2004	list
(303149) 2004 DY_{70}	26 February 2004	list
(303541) 2005 EQ_{312}	10 March 2005	list
(303543) 2005 EG_{317}	12 March 2005	list
(303594) 2005 GB_{192}	12 April 2005	list
(303595) 2005 GZ_{199}	10 April 2005	list
(303948) 2005 XZ_{109}	1 December 2005	list
(304547) 2006 UC_{314}	19 October 2006	list
(304549) 2006 UM_{325}	20 October 2006	list

(306792) 2001 KQ_{77}	23 May 2001	list
(307463) 2002 VU130	7 November 2002	list
(307615) 2003 QR_{82}	24 August 2003	list
(307616) 2003 QW_{90}	23 August 2003	list
(307758) 2003 UD_{391}	22 October 2003	list
(307812) 2003 WQ_{181}	21 November 2003	list
(308237) 2005 EU_{317}	12 March 2005	list
(308340) 2005 PB_{24}	9 August 2005	list
(308634) 2005 XU_{100}	1 December 2005	list
(309061) 2006 UH_{320}	19 October 2006	list
(310443) 2000 CF_{111}	6 February 2000	list
(310647) 2002 CM_{273}	8 February 2002	list
(310675) 2002 FH_{31}	20 March 2002	list
(312791) 2010 VT_{164}	18 November 1998	list
(313534) 2002 XN_{92}	5 December 2002	list
(316979) 2001 FK_{184}	26 March 2001	list
(317245) 2002 CA_{258}	6 February 2002	list
(317663) 2003 FS_{124}	30 March 2003	list
(317727) 2003 QP_{86}	25 August 2003	list
(317913) 2003 UA_{288}	23 October 2003	list
(318022) 2004 DE_{68}	26 February 2004	list
(318360) 2004 TL_{354}	11 October 2004	list
(318584) 2005 GV_{187}	12 April 2005	list
(318585) 2005 GA_{188}	12 April 2005	list
(319127) 2005 XQ_{105}	1 December 2005	list

(319392) 2006 EL_{68}	2 March 2006	list
(319393) 2006 EV_{68}	2 March 2006	list
(319430) 2006 HH_{140}	26 April 2006	list
(319784) 2006 US_{305}	19 October 2006	list
(319936) 2006 YE_{50}	21 December 2006	list
(322704) 2000 CP_{109}	5 February 2000	list
(323011) 2002 PQ_{154}	12 August 2002	list
(324114) 2005 XU_{109}	1 December 2005	list
(324325) 2006 HZ_{144}	27 April 2006	list
(324326) 2006 HL_{147}	27 April 2006	list
(326489) 2002 GJ_{29}	7 April 2002	list
(326745) 2003 QG_{85}	24 August 2003	list
(326874) 2003 UP_{314}	24 October 2003	list
(327467) 2005 XK_{101}	1 December 2005	list
(327468) 2005 XT_{109}	1 December 2005	list
(327469) 2005 XX_{109}	1 December 2005	list
(327867) 2006 YA_{50}	21 December 2006	list
(327869) 2006 YB_{52}	21 December 2006	list
(329284) 2000 CM_{106}	5 February 2000	list
(329285) 2000 CU_{106}	5 February 2000	list
(329704) 2003 UW_{288}	23 October 2003	list
(330118) 2005 XA_{112}	2 December 2005	list
(331629) 2002 GD_{28}	6 April 2002	list
(333452) 2003 WU_{179}	20 November 2003	list
(334400) 2002 CL_{264}	8 February 2002	list

(334880) 2003 UA_{290}	23 October 2003	list
(334883) 2003 UN_{316}	24 October 2003	list
(334906) 2003 WP_{186}	23 November 2003	list
(335236) 2005 GF_{190}	12 April 2005	list
(335237) 2005 GZ_{194}	10 April 2005	list
(337169) 1999 VP_{14}	10 November 1999	list
(337220) 2000 CC_{109}	5 February 2000	list
(338780) 2003 UG_{286}	22 October 2003	list
(338915) 2004 DM_{66}	26 February 2004	list
(339071) 2004 PH_{111}	15 August 2004	list
(339261) 2004 VX_{74}	11 November 2004	list
(339477) 2005 ET_{304}	11 March 2005	list
(339479) 2005 EN_{316}	11 March 2005	list
(339563) 2005 JT_{169}	9 May 2005	list
(340647) 2006 QK_{173}	22 August 2006	list
(344476) 2002 PX_{143}	9 August 2002	list
(344889) 2004 PJ_{111}	15 August 2004	list
(345316) 2005 XW_{114}	1 December 2005	list
(345508) 2006 JX_{67}	1 May 2006	list
(345827) 2007 HR_{92}	21 April 2007	list
(348095) 2003 WV_{193}	24 November 2003	list
(348411) 2005 JO_{174}	11 May 2005	list
(348609) 2005 XL_{111}	1 December 2005	list
(350519) 2000 CS_{107}	5 February 2000	list
(350809) 2002 CP_{257}	6 February 2002	list

(351114) 2003 UT_{393}	22 October 2003	list
(351772) 2006 EC_{69}	2 March 2006	list
(351796) 2006 HT_{144}	27 April 2006	list
(351846) 2006 QN_{180}	23 August 2006	list
(353976) 2000 CU_{107}	5 February 2000	list
(353989) 2000 QJ_{238}	25 August 2000	list
(353990) 2000 QB_{245}	25 August 2000	list
(354212) 2002 FG_{41}	20 March 2002	list
(354214) 2002 GK_{27}	6 April 2002	list
(354364) 2003 KG_{25}	31 May 2003	list
(354577) 2004 TW_{366}	10 October 2004	list
(355143) 2006 UL_{304}	19 October 2006	list
(357165) 2002 CK_{250}	6 February 2002	list
(357252) 2002 PF_{143}	9 August 2002	list
(357316) 2003 FX_{123}	30 March 2003	list
(357935) 2005 XP_{111}	1 December 2005	list
(358091) 2006 JH_{59}	1 May 2006	list
(358141) 2006 QZ_{179}	23 August 2006	list
(360250) 2000 GH_{186}	10 April 2000	list
(360405) 2002 GP_{27}	6 April 2002	list
(360804) 2005 GZ_{189}	12 April 2005	list
(361160) 2006 JP_{62}	1 May 2006	list
(361371) 2006 UP_{299}	19 October 2006	list
(361372) 2006 UL_{318}	19 October 2006	list
(361487) 2007 DG_{103}	21 February 2007	list

(363099) 2000 SH_{346}	21 September 2000	list
(363258) 2002 CW_{264}	8 February 2002	list
(363330) 2002 PQ_{145}	9 August 2002	list
(363401) 2003 LB_{7}	1 June 2003	list
(363785) 2005 GK_{191}	12 April 2005	list
(364070) 2005 XX_{107}	1 December 2005	list
(364165) 2006 HO_{127}	28 April 2006	list
(364366) 2006 UM_{302}	19 October 2006	list
(367055) 2006 JO_{65}	1 May 2006	list
(368857) 2006 HH_{134}	26 April 2006	list
(370608) 2003 WE_{182}	22 November 2003	list
(370896) 2005 EP_{299}	11 March 2005	list
(371159) 2005 XW_{101}	1 December 2005	list
(371160) 2005 XV_{102}	1 December 2005	list
(371334) 2006 JC_{59}	1 May 2006	list
(371545) 2006 UK_{304}	19 October 2006	list
(371626) 2006 YM_{50}	21 December 2006	list
(373606) 2002 CF_{271}	8 February 2002	list
(373647) 2002 PG_{147}	9 August 2002	list
(373811) 2002 VY_{129}	9 November 2002	list
(373934) 2003 UG_{288}	23 October 2003	list
(373963) 2003 WV_{182}	22 November 2003	list
(374159) 2004 UJ_{5}	18 October 2004	list
(374219) 2005 EZ_{312}	10 March 2005	list
(374220) 2005 EP_{317}	12 March 2005	list

(374251) 2005 GN_{200}	10 April 2005	list
(374645) 2006 HL_{136}	26 April 2006	list
(374653) 2006 JR_{62}	1 May 2006	list
(374845) 2006 UB_{301}	19 October 2006	list
(374846) 2006 UP_{325}	20 October 2006	list
(376844) 2001 QV_{316}	20 August 2001	list
(376845) 2001 QO_{318}	20 August 2001	list
(376957) 2002 GN_{28}	6 April 2002	list
(377513) 2005 EG_{314}	10 March 2005	list
(377542) 2005 GD_{206}	11 April 2005	list
(377747) 2005 XN_{105}	1 December 2005	list
(377960) 2006 JU_{63}	1 May 2006	list
(377961) 2006 JE_{64}	1 May 2006	list
(378119) 2006 UW_{319}	19 October 2006	list
(378263) 2007 DC_{103}	21 February 2007	list
(380560) 2004 PQ_{109}	12 August 2004	list
(382701) 2002 VR_{135}	7 November 2002	list
(383034) 2005 PH_{24}	10 August 2005	list
(383191) 2005 XG_{111}	1 December 2005	list
(383322) 2006 HB_{151}	26 April 2006	list
(385266) 2001 QB_{298}	20 August 2001	list
(385330) 2002 CL_{269}	7 February 2002	list
(385360) 2002 PW_{154}	12 August 2002	list
(385445) 2003 QH_{91}	24 August 2003	list
385446 Manwë	25 August 2003	list

(385447) 2003 QF_{113}	25 August 2003	list
(385475) 2003 UL_{288}	23 October 2003	list
(385486) 2003 WP_{178}	20 November 2003	list
(385527) 2004 OK_{14}	17 July 2004	list
(385607) 2005 EO_{297}	11 March 2005	list
(385750) 2005 XJ_{112}	2 December 2005	list
(385950) 2006 UY_{296}	19 October 2006	list
(387551) 2001 FR_{182}	25 March 2001	list
(387787) 2003 UA_{315}	23 October 2003	list
(387806) 2004 DN_{65}	22 February 2004	list
(387974) 2005 JW_{170}	10 May 2005	list
(388389) 2006 UD_{323}	19 October 2006	list
(390718) 2003 FB_{124}	30 March 2003	list
(390785) 2003 WC_{183}	23 November 2003	list
(390836) 2004 PV_{110}	14 August 2004	list
(391221) 2006 HP_{147}	27 April 2006	list
(391358) 2006 UX_{314}	19 October 2006	list
(393388) 2000 OW_{68}	30 July 2000	list
(393799) 2005 PW_{28}	10 August 2005	list
(394286) 2006 UW_{325}	20 October 2006	list
(397160) 2005 XA_{101}	1 December 2005	list
(397420) 2006 YC_{50}	21 December 2006	list
(399338) 2000 CA_{109}	5 February 2000	list
(399752) 2005 GH_{193}	10 April 2005	list
(401937) 2002 CF_{314}	6 February 2002	list

(402379) 2005 XO_{110}	1 December 2005	list
(405384) 2004 DS_{67}	26 February 2004	list
(405912) 2006 HR_{132}	26 April 2006	list
(405914) 2006 JX_{62}	1 May 2006	list
(406100) 2006 UM_{313}	19 October 2006	list
(408794) 2000 GG_{186}	10 April 2000	list
(408832) 2001 QJ_{298}	21 August 2001	list
(409324) 2004 TV_{350}	10 October 2004	list
(409338) 2004 VK_{67}	9 November 2004	list
(409404) 2005 EK_{297}	11 March 2005	list
(409417) 2005 GK_{205}	11 April 2005	list
(409813) 2006 HW_{135}	26 April 2006	list
(409819) 2006 JN_{66}	1 May 2006	list
(413148) 2002 CQ_{249}	6 February 2002	list
(413320) 2003 UJ_{389}	22 October 2003	list
(413341) 2003 WM_{180}	20 November 2003	list
(413342) 2003 WM_{183}	23 November 2003	list
(413386) 2004 PL_{111}	15 August 2004	list
(413466) 2005 EA_{313}	10 March 2005	list
(413694) 2005 XA_{111}	1 December 2005	list
(416044) 2002 FK_{40}	10 April 2002	list^{[F]}
(416048) 2002 GR_{29}	7 April 2002	list
(416777) 2005 EM_{312}	10 March 2005	list
(417214) 2005 XF_{102}	1 December 2005	list
(417215) 2005 XM_{103}	1 December 2005	list

(417216) 2005 XV_{109}	1 December 2005	list
(417396) 2006 HM_{134}	26 April 2006	list
(417397) 2006 HE_{149}	27 April 2006	list
(420589) 2012 HD_{30}	21 December 2006	list^{[F]}
(422416) 2014 SV_{282}	21 December 2006	list^{[F]}
(422833) 2002 CB_{281}	8 February 2002	list
(422981) 2003 QN_{81}	23 August 2003	list
(423194) 2004 OF_{15}	16 July 2004	list
(423319) 2005 EG_{312}	10 March 2005	list
(427581) 2003 QB_{92}	24 August 2003	list
(427814) 2005 GV_{189}	12 April 2005	list
(430826) 2005 GQ_{205}	11 April 2005	list
(431368) 2007 DN_{103}	21 February 2007	list
(434091) 2002 CJ_{258}	6 February 2002	list
(434194) 2003 FK_{127}	30 March 2003	list
(434397) 2005 EK_{312}	10 March 2005	list
(434415) 2005 JM_{170}	10 May 2005	list
(434647) 2005 XW_{97}	1 December 2005	list
(437871) 2001 FN_{185}	26 March 2001	list
(437915) 2002 GD_{32}	7 April 2002	list
(438028) 2004 EH_{96}	15 March 2004	list
(438268) 2005 XX_{108}	1 December 2005	list
(438315) 2006 HY_{143}	27 April 2006	list
(440038) 2002 PX_{151}	10 August 2002	list
(440169) 2003 WL_{186}	23 November 2003	list

(440354) 2004 TR_{350}	10 October 2004	list
(440355) 2004 TB_{354}	11 October 2004	list
(440391) 2005 GF_{198}	10 April 2005	list
(443843) 2001 FO_{185}	26 March 2001	list
(444018) 2004 EU_{95}	15 March 2004	list
(444134) 2004 TL_{366}	10 October 2004	list
(444462) 2006 EC_{68}	2 March 2006	list
(444610) 2006 US_{295}	19 October 2006	list
(446832) 2001 QT_{306}	19 August 2001	list
(446949) 2003 LL_{7}	1 June 2003	list
(447325) 2005 XA_{105}	1 December 2005	list
(455209) 2001 KT_{76}	24 May 2001	list
(455294) 2002 CM_{262}	6 February 2002	list
(455518) 2003 WH_{178}	20 November 2003	list
(455712) 2005 EH_{317}	12 March 2005	list
(456000) 2005 XA_{109}	1 December 2005	list
(461647) 2005 EC_{305}	11 March 2005	list
(461667) 2005 GO_{187}	12 April 2005	list
(461668) 2005 GY_{190}	12 April 2005	list
(467402) 2005 GE_{205}	11 April 2005	list
(469334) 2000 QG_{252}	26 August 2000	list
(469361) 2001 HY_{65}	26 April 2001	list^{[G]}
(469362) 2001 KB_{77}	23 May 2001	list
(469363) 2001 KZ_{77}	24 May 2001	list
(469372) 2001 QF298	19 August 2001	list

(469438) 2002 GV_{31}	6 April 2002	list
(469505) 2003 FE_{128}	31 March 2003	list
(469506) 2003 FF_{128}	31 March 2003	list
(469514) 2003 QA_{91}	24 August 2003	list
(469593) 2004 DH_{65}	22 February 2004	list
(469615) 2004 PT_{107}	13 August 2004	list
(469704) 2005 EZ_{296}	9 March 2005	list
469705 ǂKá̦gára	11 March 2005	list
(469707) 2005 GB_{187}	10 April 2005	list
(469708) 2005 GE_{187}	12 April 2005	list
(469987) 2006 HJ_{123}	27 April 2006	list
(469988) 2006 HN_{140}	26 April 2006	list
(474236) 2001 QW_{317}	20 August 2001	list
(474750) 2005 PV_{28}	8 August 2005	list
(475438) 2006 QD_{173}	22 August 2006	list
(481368) 2006 HQ_{132}	26 April 2006	list
(481369) 2006 HN_{142}	27 April 2006	list
(483439) 2001 QX_{300}	19 August 2001	list
(483440) 2001 RD_{155}	12 September 2001	list
(483638) 2004 UM_{5}	18 October 2004	list
486958 Arrokoth	26 June 2014	list
(488647) 2003 QL_{81}	23 August 2003	list
(488695) 2003 WL_{187}	23 November 2003	list
(496864) 2000 CW_{108}	5 February 2000	list
(497023) 2003 LX_{7}	1 June 2003	list

(497030) 2003 QV_{117}	26 August 2003	list
(497267) 2005 JX_{172}	10 May 2005	list
(497268) 2005 JW_{174}	11 May 2005	list
(497438) 2005 XJ_{100}	1 December 2005	list
(497898) 2006 UJ_{323}	19 October 2006	list
(504110) 2006 HT_{131}	26 April 2006	list
(506468) 2002 PA_{147}	9 August 2002	list
(508788) 2000 CQ_{114}	6 February 2000	list
(508823) 2001 RX_{143}	12 September 2001	list
(508849) 2002 CY_{264}	8 February 2002	list
(508869) 2002 VT130	7 November 2002	list
518458 Roblambert	10 April 2005	list
(523588) 2000 CN_{105}	6 February 2000	list
(523591) 2001 QD_{298}	19 August 2001	list
(523955) 1998 UU_{43}	22 October 1998	list
(524049) 2000 CQ_{105}	5 February 2000	list
(524133) 2000 SV_{345}	20 September 2000	list
(524179) 2001 FQ_{185}	26 March 2001	list
(524216) 2001 RU_{143}	12 September 2001	list
(524217) 2001 RZ_{143}	12 September 2001	list
(524435) 2002 CY_{248}	6 February 2002	list
(524458) 2002 FT_{18}	18 March 2002	list
(524460) 2002 GF_{32}	8 April 2002	list
(524531) 2002 XH_{91}	4 December 2002	list
524607 Davecarter	26 August 2003	list

(524612) 2003 QA_{112}	26 August 2003	list
(525257) 2004 VS_{75}	9 November 2004	list
(525258) 2004 VT_{75}	9 November 2004	list
(525459) 2005 ER_{297}	11 March 2005	list
(525460) 2005 EX_{297}	11 March 2005	list
(525461) 2005 EN_{302}	11 March 2005	list
(525462) 2005 EO_{304}	11 March 2005	list
(525595) 2005 JP_{179}	11 May 2005	list
(525596) 2005 JR_{179}	11 May 2005	list
(525617) 2005 LA_{47}	5 February 2000	list^{[A]}
(526408) 2006 HS_{130}	26 April 2006	list
(542544) 2013 EN_{86}	21 December 2006	list^{[F]}
(547779) 2010 VJ_{181}	21 December 2006	list^{[F]}
(547869) 2010 WN_{39}	21 December 2006	list^{[F]}
(550317) 2012 DT_{88}	21 December 2006	list^{[F]}
(550781) 2012 TE_{152}	15 March 2002	list
(551388) 2013 CF_{48}	5 February 2000	list^{[A]}
(553951) 2012 DL_{104}	21 December 2006	list^{[F]}
(556034) 2014 JC_{34}	10 April 2000	list
(556601) 2014 QW_{224}	10 April 2000	list
(563851) 2016 EH_{120}	21 December 2006	list^{[F]}
(570116) 2006 DG_{81}	24 March 2001	list^{[D]}
(571016) 2006 YN_{60}	21 December 2006	list^{[F]}
(571075) 2007 BC_{100}	21 December 2006	list^{[F]}
(573888) 2009 VX_{85}	15 March 2002	list

(574872) 2011 BS_{3}	21 December 2006	list^{[F]}
(574905) 2011 BU_{164}	21 December 2006	list^{[F]}
(575992) 2012 BH_{32}	21 December 2006	list^{[F]}
(576864) 2012 VV_{84}	21 December 2006	list^{[F]}
(577056) 2013 AP_{24}	21 December 2006	list^{[F]}
(578895) 2014 HK_{50}	11 November 1999	list^{[D]}
(582898) 2016 CJ_{161}	21 December 2006	list^{[F]}
(588581) 2008 GX_{167}	21 December 2006	list^{[F]}
(589567) 2010 EZ_{103}	24 March 2001	list^{[D]}
(594953) 2000 CS_{104}	5 February 2000	list^{[A]}
(595253) 2002 ES_{152}	15 March 2002	list
(597301) 2006 YN_{64}	21 December 2006	list^{[F]}
(601842) 2013 TN_{95}	10 April 2000	list
(607258) 2000 CQ_{118}	5 February 2000	list^{[A]}
(611593) 2007 BN_{54}	21 December 2006	list^{[F]}
(612081) 1998 WG_{24}	18 November 1998	list
(612082) 1998 WY_{24}	18 November 1998	list
(612083) 1998 WX_{31}	18 November 1998	list
(612144) 2000 CP_{104}	6 February 2000	list
(612145) 2000 CQ_{104}	6 February 2000	list
(612146) 2000 CE_{105}	5 February 2000	list
(612147) 2000 CF_{105}	5 February 2000	list
(612148) 2000 CG_{105}	5 February 2000	list
(612149) 2000 CJ_{105}	5 February 2000	list
(612150) 2000 CO_{105}	5 February 2000	list

(612151) 2000 CX_{110}	6 February 2000	list
(612166) 2000 ON_{67}	31 July 2000	list^{[D]}
(612167) 2000 OU_{69}	29 July 2000	list
(612176) 2000 QL_{251}	25 August 2000	list^{[D]}
(612213) 2001 FK_{185}	25 March 2001	list
(612214) 2001 FK_{193}	25 March 2001	list
(612218) 2001 KD_{77}	24 May 2001	list
(612236) 2001 QO_{297}	19 August 2001	list
(612237) 2001 QP_{297}	19 August 2001	list
(612238) 2001 QR_{297}	20 August 2001	list
(612239) 2001 QC_{298}	21 August 2001	list
(612240) 2001 QE_{298}	19 August 2001	list
(612241) 2001 QH_{298}	19 August 2001	list
(612242) 2001 QQ_{322}	21 August 2001	list
(612243) 2001 QR_{322}	21 August 2001	list
(612244) 2001 QS_{322}	19 August 2001	list
(612332) 2002 CW_{224}	6 February 2002	list
(612333) 2002 CZ_{224}	7 February 2002	list
(612349) 2002 GH_{32}	8 April 2002	list
(612350) 2002 GP_{32}	6 April 2002	list
(612351) 2002 GV_{32}	8 April 2002	list
(612352) 2002 GY_{32}	6 April 2002	list
(612386) 2002 PJ_{152}	10 August 2002	list
(612524) 2002 VD_{130}	7 November 2002	list
(612573) 2003 QV_{90}	23 August 2003	list

(612574) 2003 QB_{91}	24 August 2003	list
(612575) 2003 QK_{91}	25 August 2003	list
(612576) 2003 QO_{91}	23 August 2003	list
(612577) 2003 QQ_{91}	23 August 2003	list
(612578) 2003 QR_{91}	24 August 2003	list
(612579) 2003 QT_{91}	25 August 2003	list
(612580) 2003 QA_{92}	24 August 2003	list
(612581) 2003 QX_{111}	25 August 2003	list
(612582) 2003 QY_{111}	25 August 2003	list
(612583) 2003 QZ_{111}	26 August 2003	list
(612584) 2003 QX_{113}	31 August 2003	list
(612688) 2003 UT_{292}	24 October 2003	list
(612719) 2003 WU_{188}	24 November 2003	list
(612772) 2004 FU_{148}	16 March 2004	list^{[A]}^{[F]}^{[H]}
(612793) 2004 PW_{107}	13 August 2004	list
(612794) 2004 PY_{107}	14 August 2004	list
(612795) 2004 PA_{108}	14 August 2004	list
(612798) 2004 PA_{112}	13 August 2004	list
(612883) 2004 TF_{282}	15 October 2004	list
(612891) 2004 TT_{357}	15 October 2004	list
(612892) 2004 TV_{357}	15 October 2004	list
(612894) 2004 UF_{5}	18 October 2004	list
(612899) 2004 VG_{82}	10 November 2004	list
(612950) 2005 EY_{296}	9 March 2005	list
(612951) 2005 EB_{299}	11 March 2005	list

(612952) 2005 EZ_{300}	11 March 2005	list
(612953) 2005 ER_{318}	12 March 2005	list
(612965) 2005 GX_{189}	12 April 2005	list
(612966) 2005 GL_{190}	12 April 2005	list
(612967) 2005 GF_{195}	10 April 2005	list
(612985) 2005 JA_{175}	10 May 2005	list
(613269) 2005 XZ_{97}	1 December 2005	list
(613270) 2005 XM_{108}	1 December 2005	list
(613411) 2006 HQ_{122}	26 April 2006	list
(613412) 2006 HV_{122}	27 April 2006	list
(613413) 2006 HQ_{127}	28 April 2006	list
(613414) 2006 HW_{138}	26 April 2006	list
(613418) 2006 JN_{65}	1 May 2006	list
(613639) 2006 UG_{317}	19 October 2006	list
(620978) 2006 YF_{63}	21 December 2006	list^{[F]}
(626208) 2006 YD_{62}	21 December 2006	list^{[F]}
(626236) 2007 BX_{81}	21 December 2006	list^{[F]}
(631290) 2006 YW_{54}	21 December 2006	list^{[F]}
(631292) 2006 YU_{56}	21 December 2006	list^{[F]}
(631403) 2007 ET_{80}	21 December 2006	list^{[F]}
(636363) 2014 RE_{10}	21 December 2006	list^{[F]}
(641379) 2003 SB_{459}	23 March 2015	list^{[F]}
(644962) 2007 BE_{102}	21 December 2006	list^{[F]}
(650127) 2011 WM_{133}	21 December 2006	list^{[F]}
(650429) 2012 KM_{10}	21 December 2006	list^{[F]}

(651808) 2013 GD_{103}	6 February 2000	list^{[A]}
(653181) 2014 KM_{67}	13 March 2013	list
(657439) 2016 QB_{41}	11 November 1999	list^{[D]}
(658585) 2017 SW_{84}	21 December 2006	list^{[F]}
(665753) 2009 SX_{374}	21 December 2006	list^{[F]}
(666738) 2010 TE_{180}	21 December 2006	list^{[F]}
(667109) 2011 BA_{72}	21 December 2006	list^{[F]}
(670041) 2013 EA_{142}	13 March 2013	list
(675478) 2015 XZ_{122}	21 December 2006	list^{[F]}
(676160) 2016 DD_{25}	10 April 2000	list
(678712) 2017 VE_{5}	21 December 2006	list^{[F]}
(679179) 2018 VD_{27}	21 December 2006	list^{[F]}
(679810) 2020 SS_{69}	23 March 2015	list^{[F]}
(681859) 2005 XY_{15}	10 April 2002	list^{[F]}
(684063) 2008 HQ_{62}	21 December 2006	list^{[F]}
(685402) 2009 SJ_{218}	21 December 2006	list^{[F]}
(689957) 2013 TO_{149}	5 October 2013	list
(691270) 2014 OA_{399}	21 December 2006	list^{[F]}
(691936) 2014 SD_{72}	21 December 2006	list^{[F]}
(693447) 2015 GT_{53}	15 April 2015	list^{[F]}
(697905) 2017 PC_{43}	23 March 2015	list^{[F]}
(698169) 2017 UH_{93}	22 May 2015	list
(701442) 2004 VE_{93}	9 November 2004	list^{[F]}
(701663) 2005 GB_{220}	10 March 2005	list^{[F]}
(703047) 2006 YU_{59}	21 December 2006	list^{[F]}

(703053) 2006 YD_{68}	21 December 2006	list^{[F]}
(703087) 2007 BS_{91}	21 December 2006	list^{[F]}
(706940) 2010 VQ_{264}	21 December 2006	list^{[F]}
(708386) 2012 BO_{144}	21 December 2006	list^{[F]}
(708497) 2012 DU_{104}	21 December 2006	list^{[F]}
(709300) 2012 XK_{140}	21 December 2006	list^{[F]}
(710403) 2013 TY_{153}	5 October 2013	list
(716523) 2016 CT_{224}	10 April 2000	list
(719779) 2020 ST_{17}	30 May 2014	list
(723598) 2007 BC_{14}	21 December 2006	list^{[F]}
(724787) 2008 HE_{11}	21 December 2006	list^{[F]}
(726278) 2009 VH_{10}	10 April 2000	list
(729566) 2011 GR_{92}	10 April 2000	list
(732739) 2014 KL_{20}	21 December 2006	list^{[F]}
(736235) 2015 RD_{40}	10 April 2000	list
(740067) 1999 VQ_{14}	10 November 1999	list
(742091) 2007 BS_{81}	21 December 2006	list^{[F]}
(742113) 2007 CS_{12}	21 December 2006	list^{[F]}
(745554) 2011 DA_{8}	21 December 2006	list^{[F]}
(745567) 2011 DT_{43}	21 December 2006	list^{[F]}
(748093) 2013 EB_{150}	13 March 2013	list
(756413) 2019 HR_{8}	15 April 2015	list^{[F]}
(757091) 2000 CL_{157}	5 February 2000	list^{[A]}
(758734) 2006 YJ_{54}	21 December 2006	list^{[F]}
(758798) 2007 CY_{29}	21 December 2006	list^{[F]}

(761021) 2009 FO_{63}	10 April 2000	list
(766895) 2014 QA_{218}	21 December 2006	list^{[F]}
(784937) 2015 FA_{439}	23 March 2015	list^{[F]}
(784978) 2015 FY_{471}	23 March 2015	list^{[F]}
(786574) 2016 AF_{118}	21 December 2006	list^{[F]}
(792555) 2021 JY_{29}	23 March 2015	list^{[F]}
(802802) 2015 FM_{467}	23 March 2015	list^{[F]}
(808113) 2017 UN_{17}	23 March 2015	list^{[F]}
(810439) 2020 RB_{119}	23 March 2015	list^{[F]}
(811396) 2022 SK_{82}	21 December 2006	list^{[F]}
(813422) 2006 YB_{70}	21 December 2006	list^{[F]}
(813435) 2007 BO_{45}	21 December 2006	list^{[F]}
(813437) 2007 BJ_{53}	21 December 2006	list^{[F]}
(813445) 2007 BK_{97}	21 December 2006	list^{[F]}
(825890) 2019 AJ_{80}	23 March 2015	list^{[F]}
(829665) 2006 YC_{70}	21 December 2006	list^{[F]}
(840919) 2015 EN_{69}	10 April 2000	list
(842813) 2015 YJ_{11}	10 April 2000	list
(845395) 2017 UW_{94}	23 March 2015	list^{[F]}
(846790) 2020 OK_{30}	23 March 2015	list^{[F]}
(850433) 2006 YT_{68}	21 December 2006	list^{[F]}
(850468) 2007 BP_{108}	21 December 2006	list^{[F]}
(860842) 2014 GP_{11}	10 April 2000	list
(874837) 2021 RJ_{134}	23 March 2015	list^{[F]}
Co-discovery made with:^{A} R. Millis^{B} A. B. Jordan^{C} J. L. Elliot^{D} S. D. Kern^{E} E. Chiang^{F} L. H. Wasserman^{G} K. J. Meech^{H} D. E. Trilling
