= Meanings of minor-planet names: 133001–134000 =

As minor planet discoveries are confirmed, they are given a permanent number by the IAU's Minor Planet Center (MPC), and the discoverers can then submit names for them, following the IAU's naming conventions. The list below concerns those minor planets in the specified number-range that have received names, and explains the meanings of those names.

Official naming citations of newly named small Solar System bodies are approved and published in a bulletin by IAU's Working Group for Small Bodies Nomenclature (WGSBN). Before May 2021, citations were published in MPC's Minor Planet Circulars for many decades. Recent citations can also be found on the JPL Small-Body Database (SBDB). Until his death in 2016, German astronomer Lutz D. Schmadel compiled these citations into the Dictionary of Minor Planet Names (DMP) and regularly updated the collection.

Based on Paul Herget's The Names of the Minor Planets, Schmadel also researched the unclear origin of numerous asteroids, most of which had been named prior to World War II. This article incorporates text from this source, which is in the public domain: SBDB New namings may only be added to this list below after official publication as the preannouncement of names is condemned. The WGSBN publishes a comprehensive guideline for the naming rules of non-cometary small Solar System bodies.

== 133001–133100 ==
Named minor planet	Provisional	This minor planet was named for...	Ref · Catalog
133007 Audreysimmons	2002 TB_{317}	Audrey E. Simmons (born 1989), American astronomer with the Sloan Digital Sky Survey	JPL · 133007
133008 Snedden	2002 TU_{325}	Stephanie Snedden (born 1950), American astronomer with the Sloan Digital Sky Survey	JPL · 133008
133009 Watters	2002 TT_{350}	Shannon P. Watters (born 1972), American astronomer with the Sloan Digital Sky Survey	JPL · 133009
133066 Beddingfield	2003 FQ_{124}	Chloe B. Beddingfield (b. 1987), an American planetary scientist.	IAU · 133066
133068 Lisaschulze	2003 HD_{1}	Lisa Schulze (born 1972) served as the Procurement Manager for the OTES instrument team on the OSIRIS-REx asteroid sample-return mission. She is a project manager within Arizona State University, engaged in a variety of research projects.	JPL · 133068
133074 Kenshamordola	2003 HW_{53}	Kenneth Shamordola (born 1943) is an electric engineer for the OTES instrument on the OSIRIS-REx asteroid sample-return mission. He is providing electronic design support for servo controllers and low noise signal channels for the OTES instrument design and testing.	JPL · 133074
133077 Jirsík	2003 JZ_{10}	Jan Valerián Jirsík (1798–1883), a Czech theologian, priest, writer and national revivalist	JPL · 133077

== 133101–133200 ==
back to top

Named minor planet	Provisional	This minor planet was named for...	Ref · Catalog
133142 Violapiciu	2003 QH_{9}	Viola Palomba (b. 2015) is the youngest daughter of Ernesto Palomba, one of the CINEOS observers. Her family nickname is Piciu (“little one”).	IAU · 133142
133161 Ruttkai	2003 QE_{31}	Éva Ruttkai (1927–1986), Hungarian actress	JPL · 133161

== 133201–133300 ==
back to top

Named minor planet	Provisional	This minor planet was named for...	Ref · Catalog
133243 Essen	2003 RT_{1}	The German city of Essen is located in the Ruhr area. It was the former center of the country's heavy industry.	JPL · 133243
133250 Rubik	2003 RK_{8}	Ernő Rubik (born 1944), Hungarian architect and professor, internationally renowned for designing mechanical puzzles and games	JPL · 133250
133280 Bryleen	2003 SM_{17}	Bryan Young (born 1976) and Eileen Young (born 1979), son and daughter of American astronomer James Whitney Young, who discovered this minor planet	JPL · 133280
133293 Andrushivka	2003 SA_{33}	Andrushivka Astronomical Observatory, Zhytomyr, Ukraine, the discovery site (and its first discovery)	JPL · 133293
133296 Federicotosi	2003 SE_{36}	Federico Tosi (born 1974), Italian astronomer and space scientist	JPL · 133296

== 133301–133400 ==
back to top

Named minor planet	Provisional	This minor planet was named for...	Ref · Catalog
There are no named minor planets in this number range

== 133401–133500 ==
back to top

Named minor planet	Provisional	This minor planet was named for...	Ref · Catalog
133404 Morogues	2003 SS_{170}	The French village of Morogues, known for its white wine "appellation Menetou-Salon", and also for being the apex of one of the triangles used by Jean Baptiste Joseph Delambre in 1795 for the calculation of the meridian	JPL · 133404
133432 Sarahnoble	2003 SB_{202}	Sarah K. Noble (born 1975), a discipline scientist for the Planetary Science Division at NASA	JPL · 133432

== 133501–133600 ==
back to top

Named minor planet	Provisional	This minor planet was named for...	Ref · Catalog
133527 Fredearly	2003 TZ	Frederick Young (1889–1974) and Pearl Young (1888–1958), paternal grandparents of American astronomer James Whitney Young who discovered this minor planet	JPL · 133527
133528 Ceragioli	2003 TC_{2}	Roger Ceragioli (born 1959), American optician and telescope maker (formerly scholar of classical studies specializing in ancient Greek ethno-astronomy)	JPL · 133528
133536 Alicewhagel	2003 TZ_{9}	Alice Whagel (born 1969) has worked tirelessly for many years assisting amateur and professional astronomers with their CCD cameras and related equipment.	JPL · 133536
133537 Mariomotta	2003 TL_{10}	Mario Motta, American cardiologist, amateur astronomer and telescope maker who was the president of the American Association of Variable Star Observers from 2011 to 2013	JPL · 133537
133552 Itting-Enke	2003 UJ_{4}	Sonja Itting-Enke (born 1930), Namibian astronomical educator and founder of the Cuno Hoffmeister Memorial Observatory in Windhoek, named after Cuno Hoffmeister	JPL · 133552

== 133601–133700 ==
back to top

Named minor planet	Provisional	This minor planet was named for...	Ref · Catalog
There are no named minor planets in this number range

== 133701–133800 ==
back to top

Named minor planet	Provisional	This minor planet was named for...	Ref · Catalog
133716 Tomtourville	2003 UW_{251}	Thomas Tourville (born 1940) is a consulting member of the mechanical design team on the OTES instrument on the OSIRIS-REx asteroid sample-return mission. He was the lead mechanical designer at Santa Barbara Research Center for both the TES and MiniTES.	JPL · 133716
133726 Gateswest	2003 UM_{269}	Gates West (born 1963) is the lead electronics engineer for the Thermal Emission Spectrometer of the OSIRIS-REx asteroid sample-return mission. With more than 20 years in the space industry, he has designed and tested electronics for a wide variety of earth-orbiting and interplanetary spacecraft.	JPL · 133726
133743 Robertwoodward	2003 WM	Rob Woodward (born 1967) is a Manufacturing Engineer for the OSIRIS-REx asteroid sample-return mission. Prior to joining the OTES team at ASU he was a Manufacturing Engineer and Cost Account Manager for space flight electronics with General Dynamics-AIS.	JPL · 133743
133744 Dellagiustina	2003 WD_{1}	Daniella Della-Giustina (born 1986), the Image Processing Lead of the OSIRIS-REx asteroid sample-return mission who pioneered the photogrammetric mapping of small irregular bodies	JPL · 133744
133745 Danieldrinnon	2003 WG_{1}	Daniel Drinnon (born 1960) a Systems Administrator at the Science Processing and Operations Center of the OSIRIS-REx asteroid sample-return mission. He is also an amateur astronomer whose main interests lie in restoring classic telescopes and using them for planetary imaging	JPL · 133745
133746 Tonyferro	2003 WL_{1}	Anthony Ferro (born 1963), a Systems Administrator at the Science Processing and Operations Center of the OSIRIS-REx asteroid sample-return mission and the Phoenix Mars Mission	JPL · 133746
133747 Robertofurfaro	2003 WX_{3}	Roberto Furfaro (born 1971) member of the OSIRIS-REx asteroid sample-return mission team. He has been involved as ground systems engineer, the Science Processing and Operations Center (SPOC) Systems Engineering Team Lead and the SPOC-Science Team Interface.	JPL · 133747
133753 Teresamullen	2003 WU_{25}	Teresa Mullen (born 1959), American member of the Huachuca Astronomy Club of Sierra Vista, Arizona, and wife of vice-president Keith Mullen (see 159827 Keithmullen)	JPL · 133753
133756 Carinajohnson	2003 WB_{36}	Carina Johnson (born 1985), an Image Processing Engineer at the University of Arizona for the OSIRIS-REx asteroid sample-return mission.	JPL · 133756
133773 Lindsaykeller	2003 WQ_{84}	Lindsay Keller (born 1961) was leading the Carbonaceous Meteorite Working Group of the OSIRIS-REx asteroid sample-return mission. He is a member of the sample analysis team and will investigate the atomic-scale mineralogy and chemistry of the returned samples using electron microscopy with emphasis on space weathering effects.	JPL · 133773
133774 Johnkidd	2003 WX_{88}	John Kidd (born 1989), a Science Processing and Operations Center Planning Engineer with the OSIRIS-REx asteroid sample-return mission. John was responsible for the development of the MASC tool, which was used to assist in the autonomous planning of science observations.	JPL · 133774
133782 Saraknutson	2003 WY_{98}	Sara Balram Knutson (born 1987), a Science Processing and Operations Center Operations Engineer with the OSIRIS-REx asteroid sample-return mission. She contributed to SPOC strategic and tactical planning activities, including building science instrument sequences for execution on the spacecraft.	JPL · 133782

== 133801–133900 ==
back to top

Named minor planet	Provisional	This minor planet was named for...	Ref · Catalog
133807 Johnphelps	2003 WQ_{152}	John D. Phelps Jr. (1945–2025) was an American amateur astronomer.	IAU · 133807
133814 Wenjengko	2003 WG_{170}	Wenjeng Ko (born 1955), the Science Processing and Operations Center Software Architect and Lead of the OSIRIS-REx asteroid sample-return mission. He also worked on several of NASA's Mars and Asteroid missions, including Mars 2001 Odyssey, Mars Polar Lander, Near Earth Asteroid Rendezvous and Mars Observer	JPL · 133814
133832 Loveridge	2003 XJ_{39}	Michael Francis Ubaldo Loveridge (born 1993) worked on NASA's OSIRIS-REx Mission as a software engineer at the Science Processing and Operations Center. His primary contributions included work on science data assembly and processing software.	JPL · 133832
133834 Erinmorton	2003 YX_{3}	Erin Morton (born 1975), the head of Communications and Public Engagement in the Principal Investigator's Office for the OSIRIS-REx asteroid sample-return mission.	JPL · 133834
133850 Heatherroper	2003 YN_{83}	Heather Roper (born 1993), a Graphic Designer at the University of Arizona for the OSIRIS-REx asteroid sample-return mission	JPL · 133850
133854 Wargetz	2003 YO_{149}	Annie Wargetz (born 1979), a social media lead and then as the technical documentation specialist for the SPOC of the OSIRIS-REx asteroid sample-return mission. Annie also worked in the Orion spacecraft program as a communications and outreach intern prior to the EFT-1 mission.	JPL · 133854
133861 Debrawilmer	2004 BO_{25}	Debra Wilmer (born 1972), the Executive Assistant in the Principal Investigator's Office for the OSIRIS-REx asteroid sample-return mission.	JPL · 133861
133874 Jonnazucarelli	2004 MD_{3}	Jonna L. Zucarelli (born 1987), the Business Operations Manager in the Principal Investigator's office for the OSIRIS-REx asteroid sample-return mission	JPL · 133874
133889 Nicholasmills	2004 QD_{9}	Nicholas Ock-dan Mills (born 1983), a software engineer for the OSIRIS-REx asteroid sample-return mission. He also worked as an intern on the Dawn mission as a Ground Data Systems Engineer.	JPL · 133889
133891 Jaesubhong	2004 QY_{20}	Jaesub Hong (born 1969) is an astronomer at the Harvard College Observatory serving as the lead scientist for the calibration and image reconstruction performed by the student-built Regolith X-ray Imaging Spectrometer aboard the OSIRIS-REx asteroid sample-return mission.	JPL · 133891
133892 Benkhaldoun	2004 RN_{8}	Zouhair Benkhaldoun (born 1959), Moroccan researcher in Cadi Ayyad University's department of physics in Marrakesh, Morocco	JPL · 133892

== 133901–134000 ==
back to top

Named minor planet	Provisional	This minor planet was named for...	Ref · Catalog
There are no named minor planets in this number range

back to top

Preceded by 132,001–133,000	Meanings of minor-planet names List of minor planets: 133,001–134,000	Succeeded by 134,001–135,000
