= List of minor planets: 133001–134000 =

The following is a partial list of minor planets, running from minor-planet number 133001 through 134000, inclusive. The primary data for this and other partial lists is based on JPL's "Small-Body Orbital Elements" and data available from the Minor Planet Center. Critical list information is also provided by the MPC, unless otherwise specified from Lowell Observatory. A detailed description of the table's columns and additional sources are given on the main page including a complete list of every page in this series, and a statistical break-up on the dynamical classification of minor planets.

Also see the summary list of all named bodies in numerical and alphabetical order, and the corresponding naming citations for the number range of this particular list. New namings may only be added to this list after official publication, as the preannouncement of names is condemned by the Working Group for Small Bodies Nomenclature of the International Astronomical Union.

Near-Earth obj.	MBA (inner)	MBA (outer)	Centaur
Mars-crosser	MBA (middle)	Jupiter trojan	Trans-Neptunian obj.
Unclassified

== 133001–133100 ==
Designation			Discovery			Properties		Ref
Permanent	Provisional	Named after	Date	Site	Discoverer(s)	Category	Diam.	Ref
133001	2002 TF_{282}	—	October 10, 2002	Socorro	LINEAR	·	2.8 km	MPC · JPL
133002	2002 TE_{286}	—	October 10, 2002	Socorro	LINEAR	INA	7.6 km	MPC · JPL
133003	2002 TM_{289}	—	October 10, 2002	Socorro	LINEAR	·	10 km	MPC · JPL
133004	2002 TU_{290}	—	October 10, 2002	Socorro	LINEAR	·	4.2 km	MPC · JPL
133005	2002 TH_{296}	—	October 11, 2002	Socorro	LINEAR	·	5.8 km	MPC · JPL
133006	2002 TZ_{298}	—	October 12, 2002	Socorro	LINEAR	·	6.0 km	MPC · JPL
133007 Audreysimmons	2002 TB_{317}	Audreysimmons	October 5, 2002	Apache Point	SDSS	·	4.7 km	MPC · JPL
133008 Snedden	2002 TU_{325}	Snedden	October 5, 2002	Apache Point	SDSS	·	4.9 km	MPC · JPL
133009 Watters	2002 TT_{350}	Watters	October 10, 2002	Apache Point	SDSS	·	6.0 km	MPC · JPL
133010	2002 UL_{5}	—	October 28, 2002	Palomar	NEAT	·	5.2 km	MPC · JPL
133011	2002 UN_{8}	—	October 28, 2002	Palomar	NEAT	·	6.5 km	MPC · JPL
133012	2002 UT_{16}	—	October 30, 2002	Haleakala	NEAT	CYB	6.3 km	MPC · JPL
133013	2002 US_{22}	—	October 30, 2002	Haleakala	NEAT	EOS	5.4 km	MPC · JPL
133014	2002 UD_{48}	—	October 31, 2002	Socorro	LINEAR	·	7.4 km	MPC · JPL
133015	2002 VK_{2}	—	November 3, 2002	Palomar	NEAT	EUP	6.8 km	MPC · JPL
133016	2002 VY_{7}	—	November 1, 2002	Palomar	NEAT	SYL · CYB	9.0 km	MPC · JPL
133017	2002 VQ_{47}	—	November 5, 2002	Socorro	LINEAR	·	6.0 km	MPC · JPL
133018	2002 VJ_{51}	—	November 6, 2002	Anderson Mesa	LONEOS	·	4.0 km	MPC · JPL
133019	2002 VJ_{56}	—	November 6, 2002	Anderson Mesa	LONEOS	·	7.3 km	MPC · JPL
133020	2002 VP_{61}	—	November 5, 2002	Socorro	LINEAR	·	6.5 km	MPC · JPL
133021	2002 VJ_{67}	—	November 7, 2002	Socorro	LINEAR	·	3.9 km	MPC · JPL
133022	2002 VG_{73}	—	November 7, 2002	Socorro	LINEAR	·	8.7 km	MPC · JPL
133023	2002 VY_{118}	—	November 12, 2002	Socorro	LINEAR	·	3.9 km	MPC · JPL
133024	2002 VP_{120}	—	November 12, 2002	Palomar	NEAT	·	4.2 km	MPC · JPL
133025	2002 VC_{127}	—	November 13, 2002	Palomar	NEAT	·	4.4 km	MPC · JPL
133026	2002 WW_{11}	—	November 27, 2002	Anderson Mesa	LONEOS	·	4.2 km	MPC · JPL
133027	2002 XJ_{4}	—	December 3, 2002	Palomar	NEAT	·	890 m	MPC · JPL
133028	2002 XH_{42}	—	December 6, 2002	Socorro	LINEAR	·	3.1 km	MPC · JPL
133029	2002 XT_{45}	—	December 10, 2002	Socorro	LINEAR	H	1.2 km	MPC · JPL
133030	2002 XC_{69}	—	December 13, 2002	Socorro	LINEAR	H	730 m	MPC · JPL
133031	2002 XM_{69}	—	December 5, 2002	Socorro	LINEAR	EOS	4.2 km	MPC · JPL
133032	2002 XU_{102}	—	December 5, 2002	Socorro	LINEAR	·	4.5 km	MPC · JPL
133033	2002 YD_{2}	—	December 27, 2002	Socorro	LINEAR	H	1.0 km	MPC · JPL
133034	2002 YZ_{2}	—	December 28, 2002	Ametlla de Mar	Ametlla de Mar	H	1.3 km	MPC · JPL
133035	2003 AP_{2}	—	January 2, 2003	Socorro	LINEAR	H	1.0 km	MPC · JPL
133036	2003 AX_{2}	—	January 1, 2003	Socorro	LINEAR	H	1.0 km	MPC · JPL
133037	2003 AB_{3}	—	January 3, 2003	Socorro	LINEAR	·	5.5 km	MPC · JPL
133038	2003 AD_{10}	—	January 1, 2003	Socorro	LINEAR	·	2.4 km	MPC · JPL
133039	2003 AJ_{34}	—	January 7, 2003	Socorro	LINEAR	·	1.1 km	MPC · JPL
133040	2003 BB_{34}	—	January 27, 2003	Haleakala	NEAT	H	920 m	MPC · JPL
133041	2003 BU_{38}	—	January 27, 2003	Socorro	LINEAR	EMA	6.5 km	MPC · JPL
133042	2003 BX_{42}	—	January 28, 2003	Socorro	LINEAR	H	840 m	MPC · JPL
133043	2003 BC_{43}	—	January 29, 2003	Palomar	NEAT	·	850 m	MPC · JPL
133044	2003 BM_{46}	—	January 29, 2003	Socorro	LINEAR	H	840 m	MPC · JPL
133045	2003 BH_{73}	—	January 29, 2003	Socorro	LINEAR	EUP	8.9 km	MPC · JPL
133046	2003 BC_{79}	—	January 31, 2003	Anderson Mesa	LONEOS	H	820 m	MPC · JPL
133047	2003 CG_{4}	—	February 1, 2003	Anderson Mesa	LONEOS	·	3.8 km	MPC · JPL
133048	2003 CG_{15}	—	February 4, 2003	Anderson Mesa	LONEOS	·	4.3 km	MPC · JPL
133049	2003 DU_{7}	—	February 24, 2003	Bergisch Gladbach	W. Bickel	H	1.1 km	MPC · JPL
133050	2003 DB_{17}	—	February 21, 2003	Palomar	NEAT	·	2.0 km	MPC · JPL
133051	2003 EH	—	March 2, 2003	Socorro	LINEAR	H	1 km	MPC · JPL
133052	2003 EA_{1}	—	March 2, 2003	Socorro	LINEAR	H	1.1 km	MPC · JPL
133053	2003 EB_{17}	—	March 8, 2003	Anderson Mesa	LONEOS	H	820 m	MPC · JPL
133054	2003 EL_{40}	—	March 8, 2003	Socorro	LINEAR	H	1.8 km	MPC · JPL
133055	2003 EN_{40}	—	March 8, 2003	Socorro	LINEAR	H	1.3 km	MPC · JPL
133056	2003 EU_{43}	—	March 6, 2003	Socorro	LINEAR	·	2.3 km	MPC · JPL
133057	2003 EC_{54}	—	March 11, 2003	Socorro	LINEAR	H	1.7 km	MPC · JPL
133058	2003 ED_{54}	—	March 11, 2003	Socorro	LINEAR	H	1.4 km	MPC · JPL
133059	2003 EC_{58}	—	March 9, 2003	Socorro	LINEAR	·	2.2 km	MPC · JPL
133060	2003 FT_{7}	—	March 29, 2003	Anderson Mesa	LONEOS	H	1.1 km	MPC · JPL
133061	2003 FT_{9}	—	March 22, 2003	Palomar	NEAT	V	1.4 km	MPC · JPL
133062	2003 FP_{20}	—	March 23, 2003	Palomar	NEAT	H	1.1 km	MPC · JPL
133063	2003 FM_{23}	—	March 23, 2003	Kitt Peak	Spacewatch	·	2.4 km	MPC · JPL
133064	2003 FF_{47}	—	March 24, 2003	Kitt Peak	Spacewatch	·	1.2 km	MPC · JPL
133065	2003 FH_{54}	—	March 25, 2003	Haleakala	NEAT	·	2.1 km	MPC · JPL
133066 Beddingfield	2003 FQ_{124}	Beddingfield	March 30, 2003	Kitt Peak	M. W. Buie	·	1.9 km	MPC · JPL
133067	2003 FB_{128}	—	March 30, 2003	Kitt Peak	M. W. Buie	plutino	218 km	MPC · JPL
133068 Lisaschulze	2003 HD_{1}	Lisaschulze	April 21, 2003	Catalina	CSS	·	1.3 km	MPC · JPL
133069	2003 HU_{29}	—	April 28, 2003	Anderson Mesa	LONEOS	·	1.5 km	MPC · JPL
133070	2003 HP_{31}	—	April 26, 2003	Kitt Peak	Spacewatch	·	1.2 km	MPC · JPL
133071	2003 HT_{35}	—	April 27, 2003	Socorro	LINEAR	·	1.3 km	MPC · JPL
133072	2003 HC_{39}	—	April 29, 2003	Socorro	LINEAR	·	1.3 km	MPC · JPL
133073	2003 HZ_{46}	—	April 28, 2003	Socorro	LINEAR	PHO	4.1 km	MPC · JPL
133074 Kenshamordola	2003 HW_{53}	Kenshamordola	April 21, 2003	Catalina	CSS	·	1.7 km	MPC · JPL
133075	2003 JX_{5}	—	May 1, 2003	Kitt Peak	Spacewatch	·	1.4 km	MPC · JPL
133076	2003 JO_{8}	—	May 2, 2003	Socorro	LINEAR	·	1.3 km	MPC · JPL
133077 Jirsík	2003 JZ_{10}	Jirsík	May 4, 2003	Kleť	J. Tichá, M. Tichý	·	1.1 km	MPC · JPL
133078	2003 JU_{13}	—	May 5, 2003	Anderson Mesa	LONEOS	PHO	2.6 km	MPC · JPL
133079	2003 JO_{17}	—	May 11, 2003	Reedy Creek	J. Broughton	·	1.2 km	MPC · JPL
133080	2003 KZ_{9}	—	May 26, 2003	Kitt Peak	Spacewatch	·	1.5 km	MPC · JPL
133081	2003 KH_{16}	—	May 25, 2003	Haleakala	NEAT	·	1.4 km	MPC · JPL
133082	2003 KV_{16}	—	May 29, 2003	Nashville	Clingan, R.	·	1.9 km	MPC · JPL
133083	2003 MF_{2}	—	June 22, 2003	Anderson Mesa	LONEOS	·	1.9 km	MPC · JPL
133084	2003 MU_{4}	—	June 26, 2003	Socorro	LINEAR	·	1.6 km	MPC · JPL
133085	2003 MY_{4}	—	June 26, 2003	Socorro	LINEAR	·	2.1 km	MPC · JPL
133086	2003 MN_{5}	—	June 26, 2003	Socorro	LINEAR	·	1.2 km	MPC · JPL
133087	2003 MX_{5}	—	June 26, 2003	Socorro	LINEAR	·	1.8 km	MPC · JPL
133088	2003 MG_{7}	—	June 26, 2003	Anderson Mesa	LONEOS	HNS	3.5 km	MPC · JPL
133089	2003 MQ_{8}	—	June 28, 2003	Socorro	LINEAR	·	3.0 km	MPC · JPL
133090	2003 MS_{9}	—	June 26, 2003	Socorro	LINEAR	·	2.3 km	MPC · JPL
133091	2003 MH_{10}	—	June 29, 2003	Socorro	LINEAR	TIN	1.9 km	MPC · JPL
133092	2003 MU_{11}	—	June 27, 2003	Anderson Mesa	LONEOS	NYS	2.0 km	MPC · JPL
133093	2003 NP	—	July 1, 2003	Socorro	LINEAR	·	1.3 km	MPC · JPL
133094	2003 ND_{5}	—	July 5, 2003	Reedy Creek	J. Broughton	·	5.6 km	MPC · JPL
133095	2003 NU_{6}	—	July 7, 2003	Reedy Creek	J. Broughton	·	1.8 km	MPC · JPL
133096	2003 NY_{7}	—	July 8, 2003	Palomar	NEAT	·	3.1 km	MPC · JPL
133097	2003 NE_{8}	—	July 8, 2003	Palomar	NEAT	·	2.6 km	MPC · JPL
133098	2003 NM_{8}	—	July 7, 2003	Palomar	NEAT	·	2.4 km	MPC · JPL
133099	2003 NL_{11}	—	July 3, 2003	Kitt Peak	Spacewatch	·	1.5 km	MPC · JPL
133100	2003 OJ_{1}	—	July 18, 2003	Haleakala	NEAT	·	2.5 km	MPC · JPL

== 133101–133200 ==
back to top

Designation			Discovery			Properties		Ref
Permanent	Provisional	Named after	Date	Site	Discoverer(s)	Category	Diam.	Ref
133101	2003 OJ_{2}	—	July 22, 2003	Haleakala	NEAT	·	1.1 km	MPC · JPL
133102	2003 OF_{6}	—	July 23, 2003	Palomar	NEAT	·	1.6 km	MPC · JPL
133103	2003 OG_{7}	—	July 24, 2003	Campo Imperatore	CINEOS	ERI	2.2 km	MPC · JPL
133104	2003 OP_{8}	—	July 26, 2003	Reedy Creek	J. Broughton	·	3.5 km	MPC · JPL
133105	2003 OG_{10}	—	July 25, 2003	Socorro	LINEAR	MAS	1.5 km	MPC · JPL
133106	2003 OS_{10}	—	July 27, 2003	Reedy Creek	J. Broughton	·	1.4 km	MPC · JPL
133107	2003 OX_{10}	—	July 27, 2003	Reedy Creek	J. Broughton	·	2.9 km	MPC · JPL
133108	2003 OM_{13}	—	July 28, 2003	Reedy Creek	J. Broughton	·	2.0 km	MPC · JPL
133109	2003 OO_{18}	—	July 25, 2003	Socorro	LINEAR	PHO	2.2 km	MPC · JPL
133110	2003 ON_{19}	—	July 30, 2003	Socorro	LINEAR	·	5.7 km	MPC · JPL
133111	2003 OW_{20}	—	July 31, 2003	Reedy Creek	J. Broughton	NYS	1.9 km	MPC · JPL
133112	2003 OV_{21}	—	July 29, 2003	Campo Imperatore	CINEOS	·	3.4 km	MPC · JPL
133113	2003 OO_{22}	—	July 30, 2003	Socorro	LINEAR	·	2.2 km	MPC · JPL
133114	2003 OA_{23}	—	July 30, 2003	Socorro	LINEAR	·	3.1 km	MPC · JPL
133115	2003 OR_{25}	—	July 24, 2003	Palomar	NEAT	·	1.9 km	MPC · JPL
133116	2003 OY_{25}	—	July 24, 2003	Palomar	NEAT	V	1.2 km	MPC · JPL
133117	2003 OB_{27}	—	July 24, 2003	Palomar	NEAT	·	2.0 km	MPC · JPL
133118	2003 ON_{27}	—	July 24, 2003	Palomar	NEAT	·	2.1 km	MPC · JPL
133119	2003 OK_{28}	—	July 24, 2003	Palomar	NEAT	·	3.7 km	MPC · JPL
133120	2003 OO_{31}	—	July 30, 2003	Socorro	LINEAR	·	1.7 km	MPC · JPL
133121	2003 OC_{32}	—	July 29, 2003	Campo Imperatore	CINEOS	HNS	2.1 km	MPC · JPL
133122	2003 OD_{32}	—	July 30, 2003	Socorro	LINEAR	·	5.6 km	MPC · JPL
133123	2003 PO_{1}	—	August 1, 2003	Haleakala	NEAT	·	3.1 km	MPC · JPL
133124	2003 PP_{1}	—	August 1, 2003	Haleakala	NEAT	NYS	2.3 km	MPC · JPL
133125	2003 PF_{2}	—	August 2, 2003	Haleakala	NEAT	·	2.0 km	MPC · JPL
133126	2003 PJ_{3}	—	August 2, 2003	Haleakala	NEAT	·	3.2 km	MPC · JPL
133127	2003 PY_{3}	—	August 2, 2003	Haleakala	NEAT	NYS ·	3.1 km	MPC · JPL
133128	2003 PZ_{3}	—	August 2, 2003	Haleakala	NEAT	·	2.2 km	MPC · JPL
133129	2003 PV_{4}	—	August 2, 2003	Haleakala	NEAT	·	1.5 km	MPC · JPL
133130	2003 PB_{6}	—	August 1, 2003	Socorro	LINEAR	·	2.0 km	MPC · JPL
133131	2003 PC_{8}	—	August 2, 2003	Haleakala	NEAT	·	2.1 km	MPC · JPL
133132	2003 PJ_{8}	—	August 2, 2003	Haleakala	NEAT	·	1.8 km	MPC · JPL
133133	2003 PH_{9}	—	August 4, 2003	Socorro	LINEAR	·	2.0 km	MPC · JPL
133134	2003 PN_{11}	—	August 5, 2003	Socorro	LINEAR	·	1.6 km	MPC · JPL
133135	2003 PG_{12}	—	August 5, 2003	Socorro	LINEAR	V	1.1 km	MPC · JPL
133136	2003 QS_{2}	—	August 19, 2003	Campo Imperatore	CINEOS	·	4.6 km	MPC · JPL
133137	2003 QQ_{4}	—	August 18, 2003	Haleakala	NEAT	·	1.9 km	MPC · JPL
133138	2003 QF_{6}	—	August 18, 2003	Campo Imperatore	CINEOS	·	1.9 km	MPC · JPL
133139	2003 QR_{6}	—	August 20, 2003	Haleakala	NEAT	·	1.2 km	MPC · JPL
133140	2003 QM_{7}	—	August 21, 2003	Palomar	NEAT	NYS	1.7 km	MPC · JPL
133141	2003 QN_{7}	—	August 21, 2003	Palomar	NEAT	(2076)	1.4 km	MPC · JPL
133142 Violapiciu	2003 QH_{9}	Violapiciu	August 20, 2003	Campo Imperatore	CINEOS	V	1.1 km	MPC · JPL
133143	2003 QS_{11}	—	August 21, 2003	Palomar	NEAT	·	3.0 km	MPC · JPL
133144	2003 QK_{13}	—	August 22, 2003	Haleakala	NEAT	EOS	4.3 km	MPC · JPL
133145	2003 QZ_{15}	—	August 20, 2003	Palomar	NEAT	·	1.3 km	MPC · JPL
133146	2003 QB_{17}	—	August 21, 2003	Campo Imperatore	CINEOS	·	3.9 km	MPC · JPL
133147	2003 QC_{18}	—	August 22, 2003	Palomar	NEAT	NYS	2.2 km	MPC · JPL
133148	2003 QF_{19}	—	August 22, 2003	Palomar	NEAT	·	1.9 km	MPC · JPL
133149	2003 QJ_{19}	—	August 22, 2003	Socorro	LINEAR	NYS	1.7 km	MPC · JPL
133150	2003 QX_{19}	—	August 22, 2003	Palomar	NEAT	·	1.6 km	MPC · JPL
133151	2003 QQ_{20}	—	August 22, 2003	Palomar	NEAT	·	4.4 km	MPC · JPL
133152	2003 QT_{20}	—	August 22, 2003	Palomar	NEAT	·	4.2 km	MPC · JPL
133153	2003 QU_{21}	—	August 22, 2003	Palomar	NEAT	·	3.1 km	MPC · JPL
133154	2003 QL_{23}	—	August 20, 2003	Campo Imperatore	CINEOS	·	1.8 km	MPC · JPL
133155	2003 QA_{24}	—	August 21, 2003	Palomar	NEAT	·	1.8 km	MPC · JPL
133156	2003 QZ_{25}	—	August 22, 2003	Palomar	NEAT	·	1.6 km	MPC · JPL
133157	2003 QQ_{26}	—	August 22, 2003	Haleakala	NEAT	·	4.6 km	MPC · JPL
133158	2003 QE_{27}	—	August 23, 2003	Campo Imperatore	CINEOS	·	6.6 km	MPC · JPL
133159	2003 QG_{30}	—	August 22, 2003	Reedy Creek	J. Broughton	·	2.1 km	MPC · JPL
133160	2003 QK_{30}	—	August 24, 2003	Reedy Creek	J. Broughton	·	2.4 km	MPC · JPL
133161 Ruttkai	2003 QE_{31}	Ruttkai	August 24, 2003	Piszkéstető	K. Sárneczky, B. Sipőcz	EOS	2.7 km	MPC · JPL
133162	2003 QP_{32}	—	August 21, 2003	Palomar	NEAT	·	5.2 km	MPC · JPL
133163	2003 QT_{32}	—	August 21, 2003	Haleakala	NEAT	PHO	2.1 km	MPC · JPL
133164	2003 QV_{33}	—	August 22, 2003	Palomar	NEAT	NYS	2.3 km	MPC · JPL
133165	2003 QZ_{36}	—	August 22, 2003	Socorro	LINEAR	·	1.2 km	MPC · JPL
133166	2003 QG_{37}	—	August 22, 2003	Palomar	NEAT	·	1.7 km	MPC · JPL
133167	2003 QZ_{39}	—	August 22, 2003	Socorro	LINEAR	NYS	1.8 km	MPC · JPL
133168	2003 QB_{41}	—	August 22, 2003	Socorro	LINEAR	·	1.3 km	MPC · JPL
133169	2003 QO_{41}	—	August 22, 2003	Socorro	LINEAR	NYS	1.9 km	MPC · JPL
133170	2003 QC_{42}	—	August 22, 2003	Socorro	LINEAR	(58892)	7.9 km	MPC · JPL
133171	2003 QG_{42}	—	August 22, 2003	Socorro	LINEAR	TIR	5.7 km	MPC · JPL
133172	2003 QH_{42}	—	August 22, 2003	Socorro	LINEAR	·	4.9 km	MPC · JPL
133173	2003 QK_{42}	—	August 22, 2003	Socorro	LINEAR	·	2.3 km	MPC · JPL
133174	2003 QE_{45}	—	August 23, 2003	Socorro	LINEAR	·	1.7 km	MPC · JPL
133175	2003 QB_{47}	—	August 24, 2003	Socorro	LINEAR	·	3.0 km	MPC · JPL
133176	2003 QD_{47}	—	August 24, 2003	Palomar	NEAT	·	1.6 km	MPC · JPL
133177	2003 QB_{48}	—	August 20, 2003	Palomar	NEAT	·	3.3 km	MPC · JPL
133178	2003 QK_{48}	—	August 20, 2003	Palomar	NEAT	·	1.4 km	MPC · JPL
133179	2003 QV_{48}	—	August 21, 2003	Haleakala	NEAT	·	2.2 km	MPC · JPL
133180	2003 QH_{50}	—	August 22, 2003	Palomar	NEAT	·	4.7 km	MPC · JPL
133181	2003 QO_{50}	—	August 22, 2003	Palomar	NEAT	·	2.0 km	MPC · JPL
133182	2003 QV_{50}	—	August 22, 2003	Palomar	NEAT	NYS	2.7 km	MPC · JPL
133183	2003 QU_{51}	—	August 23, 2003	Palomar	NEAT	·	2.8 km	MPC · JPL
133184	2003 QE_{53}	—	August 23, 2003	Socorro	LINEAR	T_{j} (2.98)	6.7 km	MPC · JPL
133185	2003 QF_{53}	—	August 23, 2003	Socorro	LINEAR	·	1.3 km	MPC · JPL
133186	2003 QH_{53}	—	August 23, 2003	Socorro	LINEAR	·	2.0 km	MPC · JPL
133187	2003 QS_{53}	—	August 23, 2003	Socorro	LINEAR	NYS	2.1 km	MPC · JPL
133188	2003 QW_{53}	—	August 23, 2003	Socorro	LINEAR	NYS	2.1 km	MPC · JPL
133189	2003 QM_{54}	—	August 23, 2003	Socorro	LINEAR	NYS · slow	2.0 km	MPC · JPL
133190	2003 QT_{54}	—	August 23, 2003	Socorro	LINEAR	·	2.4 km	MPC · JPL
133191	2003 QW_{54}	—	August 23, 2003	Socorro	LINEAR	·	2.1 km	MPC · JPL
133192	2003 QG_{55}	—	August 23, 2003	Socorro	LINEAR	·	2.2 km	MPC · JPL
133193	2003 QK_{57}	—	August 23, 2003	Socorro	LINEAR	·	1.4 km	MPC · JPL
133194	2003 QG_{58}	—	August 23, 2003	Socorro	LINEAR	(31811)	3.8 km	MPC · JPL
133195	2003 QE_{59}	—	August 23, 2003	Socorro	LINEAR	·	1.6 km	MPC · JPL
133196	2003 QQ_{59}	—	August 23, 2003	Socorro	LINEAR	·	2.7 km	MPC · JPL
133197	2003 QS_{59}	—	August 23, 2003	Socorro	LINEAR	ERI	4.0 km	MPC · JPL
133198	2003 QJ_{60}	—	August 23, 2003	Socorro	LINEAR	NYS	2.2 km	MPC · JPL
133199	2003 QJ_{62}	—	August 23, 2003	Socorro	LINEAR	LUT	9.8 km	MPC · JPL
133200	2003 QU_{62}	—	August 23, 2003	Socorro	LINEAR	·	4.4 km	MPC · JPL

== 133201–133300 ==
back to top

Designation			Discovery			Properties		Ref
Permanent	Provisional	Named after	Date	Site	Discoverer(s)	Category	Diam.	Ref
133201	2003 QH_{63}	—	August 23, 2003	Socorro	LINEAR	GEF	2.6 km	MPC · JPL
133202	2003 QT_{63}	—	August 23, 2003	Socorro	LINEAR	·	2.5 km	MPC · JPL
133203	2003 QC_{64}	—	August 23, 2003	Socorro	LINEAR	·	2.1 km	MPC · JPL
133204	2003 QH_{64}	—	August 23, 2003	Socorro	LINEAR	·	5.1 km	MPC · JPL
133205	2003 QO_{64}	—	August 23, 2003	Socorro	LINEAR	·	4.1 km	MPC · JPL
133206	2003 QD_{66}	—	August 22, 2003	Socorro	LINEAR	·	1.7 km	MPC · JPL
133207	2003 QO_{66}	—	August 22, 2003	Socorro	LINEAR	·	1.4 km	MPC · JPL
133208	2003 QG_{68}	—	August 25, 2003	Socorro	LINEAR	·	1.6 km	MPC · JPL
133209	2003 QN_{68}	—	August 25, 2003	Socorro	LINEAR	NYS ·	2.0 km	MPC · JPL
133210	2003 QZ_{68}	—	August 25, 2003	Reedy Creek	J. Broughton	·	1.4 km	MPC · JPL
133211	2003 QG_{71}	—	August 23, 2003	Palomar	NEAT	·	2.4 km	MPC · JPL
133212	2003 QB_{73}	—	August 24, 2003	Socorro	LINEAR	·	1.1 km	MPC · JPL
133213	2003 QS_{73}	—	August 26, 2003	Črni Vrh	Mikuž, H.	·	5.6 km	MPC · JPL
133214	2003 QF_{74}	—	August 24, 2003	Socorro	LINEAR	·	7.5 km	MPC · JPL
133215	2003 QE_{75}	—	August 24, 2003	Socorro	LINEAR	·	1.2 km	MPC · JPL
133216	2003 QT_{75}	—	August 24, 2003	Socorro	LINEAR	·	3.0 km	MPC · JPL
133217	2003 QA_{76}	—	August 24, 2003	Socorro	LINEAR	DOR	4.3 km	MPC · JPL
133218	2003 QC_{77}	—	August 24, 2003	Socorro	LINEAR	·	1.9 km	MPC · JPL
133219	2003 QA_{79}	—	August 24, 2003	Socorro	LINEAR	ADE	5.9 km	MPC · JPL
133220	2003 QX_{79}	—	August 25, 2003	Reedy Creek	J. Broughton	V	1.2 km	MPC · JPL
133221	2003 QU_{81}	—	August 23, 2003	Socorro	LINEAR	·	4.0 km	MPC · JPL
133222	2003 QQ_{85}	—	August 24, 2003	Socorro	LINEAR	·	3.7 km	MPC · JPL
133223	2003 QY_{87}	—	August 25, 2003	Socorro	LINEAR	·	2.7 km	MPC · JPL
133224	2003 QP_{88}	—	August 25, 2003	Socorro	LINEAR	·	3.8 km	MPC · JPL
133225	2003 QS_{88}	—	August 25, 2003	Socorro	LINEAR	·	4.2 km	MPC · JPL
133226	2003 QE_{93}	—	August 27, 2003	Palomar	NEAT	·	2.0 km	MPC · JPL
133227	2003 QW_{94}	—	August 29, 2003	Haleakala	NEAT	·	3.3 km	MPC · JPL
133228	2003 QK_{96}	—	August 31, 2003	Pla D'Arguines	D'Arguines, Pla	·	2.3 km	MPC · JPL
133229	2003 QT_{100}	—	August 28, 2003	Haleakala	NEAT	V	1.1 km	MPC · JPL
133230	2003 QW_{100}	—	August 28, 2003	Haleakala	NEAT	·	2.9 km	MPC · JPL
133231	2003 QR_{103}	—	August 31, 2003	Haleakala	NEAT	·	1.6 km	MPC · JPL
133232	2003 QM_{105}	—	August 31, 2003	Haleakala	NEAT	·	4.9 km	MPC · JPL
133233	2003 QC_{106}	—	August 30, 2003	Kitt Peak	Spacewatch	·	4.4 km	MPC · JPL
133234	2003 QO_{106}	—	August 31, 2003	Kitt Peak	Spacewatch	MAS	1.2 km	MPC · JPL
133235	2003 QX_{106}	—	August 30, 2003	Kitt Peak	Spacewatch	·	3.2 km	MPC · JPL
133236	2003 QF_{107}	—	August 31, 2003	Socorro	LINEAR	·	1.4 km	MPC · JPL
133237	2003 QH_{107}	—	August 31, 2003	Socorro	LINEAR	·	2.2 km	MPC · JPL
133238	2003 QN_{107}	—	August 31, 2003	Socorro	LINEAR	·	1.3 km	MPC · JPL
133239	2003 QG_{109}	—	August 31, 2003	Socorro	LINEAR	·	2.2 km	MPC · JPL
133240	2003 QU_{110}	—	August 31, 2003	Socorro	LINEAR	·	1.3 km	MPC · JPL
133241	2003 QG_{111}	—	August 31, 2003	Socorro	LINEAR	·	2.7 km	MPC · JPL
133242	2003 QT_{111}	—	August 31, 2003	Haleakala	NEAT	·	1.4 km	MPC · JPL
133243 Essen	2003 RT_{1}	Essen	September 2, 2003	Essen	Payer, T.	·	2.6 km	MPC · JPL
133244	2003 RZ_{1}	—	September 1, 2003	Socorro	LINEAR	PHO	2.1 km	MPC · JPL
133245	2003 RL_{2}	—	September 1, 2003	Socorro	LINEAR	·	2.5 km	MPC · JPL
133246	2003 RB_{3}	—	September 1, 2003	Socorro	LINEAR	·	2.4 km	MPC · JPL
133247	2003 RK_{6}	—	September 1, 2003	Socorro	LINEAR	MAR	2.5 km	MPC · JPL
133248	2003 RN_{6}	—	September 1, 2003	Socorro	LINEAR	V	1.1 km	MPC · JPL
133249	2003 RS_{6}	—	September 1, 2003	Socorro	LINEAR	·	1.4 km	MPC · JPL
133250 Rubik	2003 RK_{8}	Rubik	September 5, 2003	Piszkéstető	K. Sárneczky, B. Sipőcz	·	2.3 km	MPC · JPL
133251	2003 RP_{10}	—	September 4, 2003	Socorro	LINEAR	·	2.1 km	MPC · JPL
133252	2003 RT_{10}	—	September 8, 2003	Haleakala	NEAT	·	3.6 km	MPC · JPL
133253	2003 RF_{13}	—	September 14, 2003	Haleakala	NEAT	PAD	4.4 km	MPC · JPL
133254	2003 RB_{14}	—	September 15, 2003	Haleakala	NEAT	·	6.4 km	MPC · JPL
133255	2003 RL_{14}	—	September 14, 2003	Haleakala	NEAT	V	1.3 km	MPC · JPL
133256	2003 RH_{18}	—	September 15, 2003	Palomar	NEAT	MAR	2.6 km	MPC · JPL
133257	2003 RE_{20}	—	September 15, 2003	Anderson Mesa	LONEOS	·	2.9 km	MPC · JPL
133258	2003 RG_{20}	—	September 15, 2003	Anderson Mesa	LONEOS	AST	4.2 km	MPC · JPL
133259	2003 RK_{21}	—	September 15, 2003	Anderson Mesa	LONEOS	KOR	2.4 km	MPC · JPL
133260	2003 RL_{23}	—	September 13, 2003	Haleakala	NEAT	·	1.4 km	MPC · JPL
133261	2003 RR_{23}	—	September 14, 2003	Palomar	NEAT	(5)	2.2 km	MPC · JPL
133262	2003 RK_{26}	—	September 3, 2003	Haleakala	NEAT	·	2.6 km	MPC · JPL
133263	2003 SB_{1}	—	September 16, 2003	Palomar	NEAT	EOS	3.6 km	MPC · JPL
133264	2003 SO_{1}	—	September 16, 2003	Kitt Peak	Spacewatch	·	2.1 km	MPC · JPL
133265	2003 SX_{1}	—	September 16, 2003	Kitt Peak	Spacewatch	·	2.3 km	MPC · JPL
133266	2003 SH_{2}	—	September 16, 2003	Kitt Peak	Spacewatch	·	3.5 km	MPC · JPL
133267	2003 SJ_{3}	—	September 16, 2003	Palomar	NEAT	·	5.0 km	MPC · JPL
133268	2003 SY_{3}	—	September 16, 2003	Kitt Peak	Spacewatch	KOR	2.8 km	MPC · JPL
133269	2003 SG_{4}	—	September 16, 2003	Kitt Peak	Spacewatch	·	3.1 km	MPC · JPL
133270	2003 SH_{4}	—	September 16, 2003	Kitt Peak	Spacewatch	·	3.8 km	MPC · JPL
133271	2003 SN_{4}	—	September 16, 2003	Palomar	NEAT	·	6.7 km	MPC · JPL
133272	2003 SN_{10}	—	September 17, 2003	Kitt Peak	Spacewatch	·	1.6 km	MPC · JPL
133273	2003 SC_{13}	—	September 16, 2003	Kitt Peak	Spacewatch	MAS	1.0 km	MPC · JPL
133274	2003 SJ_{13}	—	September 16, 2003	Kitt Peak	Spacewatch	·	2.8 km	MPC · JPL
133275	2003 SL_{14}	—	September 17, 2003	Kitt Peak	Spacewatch	KOR	2.1 km	MPC · JPL
133276	2003 SV_{14}	—	September 17, 2003	Kitt Peak	Spacewatch	·	2.2 km	MPC · JPL
133277	2003 SY_{16}	—	September 17, 2003	Kitt Peak	Spacewatch	·	2.2 km	MPC · JPL
133278	2003 SA_{17}	—	September 17, 2003	Kitt Peak	Spacewatch	·	5.0 km	MPC · JPL
133279	2003 SF_{17}	—	September 18, 2003	Campo Imperatore	CINEOS	·	3.7 km	MPC · JPL
133280 Bryleen	2003 SM_{17}	Bryleen	September 18, 2003	Wrightwood	J. W. Young	·	2.9 km	MPC · JPL
133281	2003 ST_{17}	—	September 17, 2003	Kitt Peak	Spacewatch	·	1.9 km	MPC · JPL
133282	2003 SX_{17}	—	September 17, 2003	Kitt Peak	Spacewatch	·	3.0 km	MPC · JPL
133283	2003 SO_{21}	—	September 16, 2003	Kitt Peak	Spacewatch	·	1.8 km	MPC · JPL
133284	2003 SH_{22}	—	September 16, 2003	Palomar	NEAT	GEF	2.7 km	MPC · JPL
133285	2003 SU_{23}	—	September 17, 2003	Kitt Peak	Spacewatch	·	3.5 km	MPC · JPL
133286	2003 SD_{26}	—	September 17, 2003	Haleakala	NEAT	(5)	1.8 km	MPC · JPL
133287	2003 SO_{26}	—	September 17, 2003	Haleakala	NEAT	MAS	1.1 km	MPC · JPL
133288	2003 SJ_{27}	—	September 18, 2003	Socorro	LINEAR	AGN	1.9 km	MPC · JPL
133289	2003 SX_{27}	—	September 18, 2003	Palomar	NEAT	·	3.8 km	MPC · JPL
133290	2003 SA_{28}	—	September 18, 2003	Palomar	NEAT	·	2.2 km	MPC · JPL
133291	2003 SX_{28}	—	September 18, 2003	Palomar	NEAT	·	3.2 km	MPC · JPL
133292	2003 SZ_{30}	—	September 18, 2003	Palomar	NEAT	·	8.9 km	MPC · JPL
133293 Andrushivka	2003 SA_{33}	Andrushivka	September 18, 2003	Andrushivka	Andrushivka	·	3.3 km	MPC · JPL
133294	2003 SB_{34}	—	September 18, 2003	Socorro	LINEAR	V	850 m	MPC · JPL
133295	2003 SK_{35}	—	September 18, 2003	Palomar	NEAT	·	7.5 km	MPC · JPL
133296 Federicotosi	2003 SE_{36}	Federicotosi	September 19, 2003	Campo Imperatore	CINEOS	GAL	3.0 km	MPC · JPL
133297	2003 SW_{36}	—	September 19, 2003	Desert Eagle	W. K. Y. Yeung	·	1.4 km	MPC · JPL
133298	2003 SU_{37}	—	September 16, 2003	Palomar	NEAT	·	2.3 km	MPC · JPL
133299	2003 SC_{39}	—	September 16, 2003	Palomar	NEAT	·	2.4 km	MPC · JPL
133300	2003 SB_{40}	—	September 16, 2003	Palomar	NEAT	·	1.5 km	MPC · JPL

== 133301–133400 ==
back to top

Designation			Discovery			Properties		Ref
Permanent	Provisional	Named after	Date	Site	Discoverer(s)	Category	Diam.	Ref
133301	2003 SX_{43}	—	September 16, 2003	Anderson Mesa	LONEOS	·	2.5 km	MPC · JPL
133302	2003 SM_{45}	—	September 16, 2003	Anderson Mesa	LONEOS	MAS	1.5 km	MPC · JPL
133303	2003 SR_{45}	—	September 16, 2003	Anderson Mesa	LONEOS	HOF	5.0 km	MPC · JPL
133304	2003 SZ_{45}	—	September 16, 2003	Anderson Mesa	LONEOS	·	3.7 km	MPC · JPL
133305	2003 SG_{46}	—	September 16, 2003	Anderson Mesa	LONEOS	KOR	2.8 km	MPC · JPL
133306	2003 SB_{49}	—	September 18, 2003	Palomar	NEAT	·	4.5 km	MPC · JPL
133307	2003 SZ_{51}	—	September 18, 2003	Palomar	NEAT	·	5.2 km	MPC · JPL
133308	2003 SK_{52}	—	September 18, 2003	Palomar	NEAT	·	5.3 km	MPC · JPL
133309	2003 SF_{57}	—	September 16, 2003	Kitt Peak	Spacewatch	·	5.5 km	MPC · JPL
133310	2003 SO_{57}	—	September 16, 2003	Kitt Peak	Spacewatch	EOS	4.9 km	MPC · JPL
133311	2003 SY_{57}	—	September 16, 2003	Kitt Peak	Spacewatch	KOR	2.6 km	MPC · JPL
133312	2003 SC_{66}	—	September 18, 2003	Socorro	LINEAR	NYS	2.0 km	MPC · JPL
133313	2003 SO_{69}	—	September 17, 2003	Kitt Peak	Spacewatch	KOR	2.2 km	MPC · JPL
133314	2003 SS_{74}	—	September 18, 2003	Kitt Peak	Spacewatch	·	2.9 km	MPC · JPL
133315	2003 SE_{76}	—	September 18, 2003	Kitt Peak	Spacewatch	·	5.5 km	MPC · JPL
133316	2003 SO_{81}	—	September 19, 2003	Kitt Peak	Spacewatch	·	3.8 km	MPC · JPL
133317	2003 SX_{81}	—	September 17, 2003	Kitt Peak	Spacewatch	·	3.9 km	MPC · JPL
133318	2003 SQ_{84}	—	September 21, 2003	Anderson Mesa	LONEOS	·	1.5 km	MPC · JPL
133319	2003 SX_{86}	—	September 17, 2003	Socorro	LINEAR	EOS	4.1 km	MPC · JPL
133320	2003 SB_{87}	—	September 17, 2003	Socorro	LINEAR	·	3.3 km	MPC · JPL
133321	2003 SE_{88}	—	September 18, 2003	Campo Imperatore	CINEOS	·	3.8 km	MPC · JPL
133322	2003 SF_{88}	—	September 18, 2003	Campo Imperatore	CINEOS	KOR	2.7 km	MPC · JPL
133323	2003 SL_{88}	—	September 18, 2003	Campo Imperatore	CINEOS	·	4.2 km	MPC · JPL
133324	2003 SY_{90}	—	September 18, 2003	Socorro	LINEAR	3:2	7.0 km	MPC · JPL
133325	2003 SL_{92}	—	September 18, 2003	Palomar	NEAT	·	2.6 km	MPC · JPL
133326	2003 SA_{93}	—	September 18, 2003	Palomar	NEAT	KOR	2.5 km	MPC · JPL
133327	2003 SD_{93}	—	September 18, 2003	Kitt Peak	Spacewatch	HYG	6.6 km	MPC · JPL
133328	2003 SN_{93}	—	September 18, 2003	Kitt Peak	Spacewatch	·	3.7 km	MPC · JPL
133329	2003 SC_{94}	—	September 18, 2003	Palomar	NEAT	·	2.6 km	MPC · JPL
133330	2003 SJ_{95}	—	September 19, 2003	Palomar	NEAT	·	5.7 km	MPC · JPL
133331	2003 SQ_{95}	—	September 19, 2003	Palomar	NEAT	·	1.8 km	MPC · JPL
133332	2003 SR_{95}	—	September 19, 2003	Palomar	NEAT	·	3.4 km	MPC · JPL
133333	2003 SX_{97}	—	September 19, 2003	Socorro	LINEAR	·	4.0 km	MPC · JPL
133334	2003 SK_{98}	—	September 19, 2003	Kitt Peak	Spacewatch	GEF	2.4 km	MPC · JPL
133335	2003 SW_{98}	—	September 19, 2003	Haleakala	NEAT	·	2.8 km	MPC · JPL
133336	2003 SR_{102}	—	September 20, 2003	Socorro	LINEAR	·	4.8 km	MPC · JPL
133337	2003 SM_{103}	—	September 20, 2003	Socorro	LINEAR	·	8.1 km	MPC · JPL
133338	2003 SQ_{103}	—	September 20, 2003	Socorro	LINEAR	·	3.5 km	MPC · JPL
133339	2003 SN_{104}	—	September 20, 2003	Haleakala	NEAT	·	2.9 km	MPC · JPL
133340	2003 SX_{105}	—	September 20, 2003	Palomar	NEAT	·	1.3 km	MPC · JPL
133341	2003 SK_{106}	—	September 20, 2003	Socorro	LINEAR	·	7.2 km	MPC · JPL
133342	2003 SL_{106}	—	September 20, 2003	Haleakala	NEAT	·	1.1 km	MPC · JPL
133343	2003 SJ_{107}	—	September 20, 2003	Palomar	NEAT	·	3.3 km	MPC · JPL
133344	2003 SK_{107}	—	September 20, 2003	Palomar	NEAT	·	3.6 km	MPC · JPL
133345	2003 SR_{108}	—	September 20, 2003	Palomar	NEAT	·	6.4 km	MPC · JPL
133346	2003 SZ_{109}	—	September 20, 2003	Palomar	NEAT	MAR	1.9 km	MPC · JPL
133347	2003 SJ_{110}	—	September 20, 2003	Palomar	NEAT	·	3.4 km	MPC · JPL
133348	2003 SX_{110}	—	September 20, 2003	Palomar	NEAT	·	4.7 km	MPC · JPL
133349	2003 SK_{117}	—	September 16, 2003	Kitt Peak	Spacewatch	·	3.9 km	MPC · JPL
133350	2003 SM_{117}	—	September 16, 2003	Kitt Peak	Spacewatch	·	7.8 km	MPC · JPL
133351	2003 SK_{123}	—	September 18, 2003	Socorro	LINEAR	·	2.2 km	MPC · JPL
133352	2003 SZ_{123}	—	September 18, 2003	Goodricke-Pigott	R. A. Tucker	EOS	4.7 km	MPC · JPL
133353	2003 SG_{124}	—	September 18, 2003	Palomar	NEAT	·	2.5 km	MPC · JPL
133354	2003 SX_{124}	—	September 18, 2003	Črni Vrh	Mikuž, H.	·	3.5 km	MPC · JPL
133355	2003 SV_{125}	—	September 19, 2003	Socorro	LINEAR	·	3.6 km	MPC · JPL
133356	2003 SJ_{126}	—	September 19, 2003	Kitt Peak	Spacewatch	·	6.9 km	MPC · JPL
133357	2003 SS_{127}	—	September 20, 2003	Desert Eagle	W. K. Y. Yeung	·	3.1 km	MPC · JPL
133358	2003 SY_{127}	—	September 20, 2003	Socorro	LINEAR	·	3.0 km	MPC · JPL
133359	2003 SC_{128}	—	September 20, 2003	Socorro	LINEAR	·	3.7 km	MPC · JPL
133360	2003 SH_{129}	—	September 20, 2003	Črni Vrh	Skvarč, J.	·	3.8 km	MPC · JPL
133361	2003 SS_{131}	—	September 18, 2003	Kitt Peak	Spacewatch	AGN	1.7 km	MPC · JPL
133362	2003 SK_{132}	—	September 19, 2003	Kitt Peak	Spacewatch	KOR	1.8 km	MPC · JPL
133363	2003 SJ_{134}	—	September 18, 2003	Palomar	NEAT	·	3.3 km	MPC · JPL
133364	2003 SS_{136}	—	September 19, 2003	Campo Imperatore	CINEOS	·	2.6 km	MPC · JPL
133365	2003 SA_{140}	—	September 18, 2003	Campo Imperatore	CINEOS	·	1.2 km	MPC · JPL
133366	2003 SB_{141}	—	September 19, 2003	Palomar	NEAT	·	4.3 km	MPC · JPL
133367	2003 SK_{141}	—	September 19, 2003	Palomar	NEAT	PHO	3.1 km	MPC · JPL
133368	2003 SO_{142}	—	September 20, 2003	Socorro	LINEAR	·	5.4 km	MPC · JPL
133369	2003 SC_{143}	—	September 20, 2003	Socorro	LINEAR	·	3.7 km	MPC · JPL
133370	2003 SD_{143}	—	September 20, 2003	Socorro	LINEAR	NYS	1.3 km	MPC · JPL
133371	2003 SG_{144}	—	September 19, 2003	Palomar	NEAT	·	3.8 km	MPC · JPL
133372	2003 SR_{145}	—	September 20, 2003	Palomar	NEAT	·	6.0 km	MPC · JPL
133373	2003 SJ_{147}	—	September 20, 2003	Palomar	NEAT	PAD	6.5 km	MPC · JPL
133374	2003 SM_{148}	—	September 16, 2003	Socorro	LINEAR	EOS	3.9 km	MPC · JPL
133375	2003 SB_{149}	—	September 16, 2003	Kitt Peak	Spacewatch	·	2.4 km	MPC · JPL
133376	2003 SU_{149}	—	September 17, 2003	Socorro	LINEAR	EOS	4.2 km	MPC · JPL
133377	2003 SL_{150}	—	September 17, 2003	Socorro	LINEAR	EOS	4.1 km	MPC · JPL
133378	2003 SD_{152}	—	September 19, 2003	Anderson Mesa	LONEOS	·	1.4 km	MPC · JPL
133379	2003 SL_{153}	—	September 19, 2003	Anderson Mesa	LONEOS	·	2.6 km	MPC · JPL
133380	2003 SM_{153}	—	September 19, 2003	Anderson Mesa	LONEOS	V	1.1 km	MPC · JPL
133381	2003 SW_{153}	—	September 19, 2003	Anderson Mesa	LONEOS	·	2.7 km	MPC · JPL
133382	2003 ST_{154}	—	September 19, 2003	Anderson Mesa	LONEOS	·	6.4 km	MPC · JPL
133383	2003 SA_{156}	—	September 19, 2003	Anderson Mesa	LONEOS	·	5.7 km	MPC · JPL
133384	2003 SK_{156}	—	September 19, 2003	Anderson Mesa	LONEOS	·	1.8 km	MPC · JPL
133385	2003 SP_{156}	—	September 19, 2003	Anderson Mesa	LONEOS	·	2.5 km	MPC · JPL
133386	2003 SV_{156}	—	September 19, 2003	Anderson Mesa	LONEOS	THM	3.5 km	MPC · JPL
133387	2003 SD_{157}	—	September 19, 2003	Anderson Mesa	LONEOS	MAS	1.3 km	MPC · JPL
133388	2003 SP_{159}	—	September 22, 2003	Kitt Peak	Spacewatch	EUN	2.5 km	MPC · JPL
133389	2003 SA_{160}	—	September 20, 2003	Socorro	LINEAR	fast	3.1 km	MPC · JPL
133390	2003 SL_{160}	—	September 22, 2003	Kitt Peak	Spacewatch	GEF	2.3 km	MPC · JPL
133391	2003 SD_{162}	—	September 18, 2003	Kitt Peak	Spacewatch	·	2.2 km	MPC · JPL
133392	2003 SN_{162}	—	September 19, 2003	Kitt Peak	Spacewatch	·	2.2 km	MPC · JPL
133393	2003 SO_{162}	—	September 19, 2003	Socorro	LINEAR	·	2.5 km	MPC · JPL
133394	2003 SV_{162}	—	September 19, 2003	Kitt Peak	Spacewatch	·	3.5 km	MPC · JPL
133395	2003 SB_{163}	—	September 19, 2003	Kitt Peak	Spacewatch	KOR	2.3 km	MPC · JPL
133396	2003 SK_{163}	—	September 19, 2003	Kitt Peak	Spacewatch	·	4.6 km	MPC · JPL
133397	2003 SC_{164}	—	September 20, 2003	Anderson Mesa	LONEOS	·	3.2 km	MPC · JPL
133398	2003 SV_{164}	—	September 20, 2003	Anderson Mesa	LONEOS	·	3.2 km	MPC · JPL
133399	2003 SJ_{165}	—	September 20, 2003	Anderson Mesa	LONEOS	·	4.4 km	MPC · JPL
133400	2003 SX_{166}	—	September 22, 2003	Kitt Peak	Spacewatch	·	3.5 km	MPC · JPL

== 133401–133500 ==
back to top

Designation			Discovery			Properties		Ref
Permanent	Provisional	Named after	Date	Site	Discoverer(s)	Category	Diam.	Ref
133401	2003 SG_{169}	—	September 23, 2003	Haleakala	NEAT	EUN	1.9 km	MPC · JPL
133402	2003 SP_{169}	—	September 23, 2003	Haleakala	NEAT	CYB	7.5 km	MPC · JPL
133403	2003 SR_{169}	—	September 23, 2003	Haleakala	NEAT	·	2.5 km	MPC · JPL
133404 Morogues	2003 SS_{170}	Morogues	September 23, 2003	Saint-Sulpice	B. Christophe	·	2.8 km	MPC · JPL
133405	2003 SK_{171}	—	September 18, 2003	Campo Imperatore	CINEOS	·	3.6 km	MPC · JPL
133406	2003 SQ_{171}	—	September 18, 2003	Kitt Peak	Spacewatch	·	3.0 km	MPC · JPL
133407	2003 SJ_{173}	—	September 18, 2003	Socorro	LINEAR	·	3.6 km	MPC · JPL
133408	2003 SU_{173}	—	September 18, 2003	Palomar	NEAT	·	4.7 km	MPC · JPL
133409	2003 SN_{175}	—	September 18, 2003	Kitt Peak	Spacewatch	·	4.6 km	MPC · JPL
133410	2003 SP_{176}	—	September 18, 2003	Palomar	NEAT	·	2.2 km	MPC · JPL
133411	2003 SE_{177}	—	September 18, 2003	Palomar	NEAT	·	3.8 km	MPC · JPL
133412	2003 SM_{177}	—	September 18, 2003	Palomar	NEAT	KOR	2.5 km	MPC · JPL
133413	2003 SU_{177}	—	September 19, 2003	Kitt Peak	Spacewatch	·	3.4 km	MPC · JPL
133414	2003 SU_{180}	—	September 19, 2003	Haleakala	NEAT	MAS	1.0 km	MPC · JPL
133415	2003 SC_{181}	—	September 20, 2003	Socorro	LINEAR	·	6.7 km	MPC · JPL
133416	2003 SW_{181}	—	September 20, 2003	Socorro	LINEAR	·	4.0 km	MPC · JPL
133417	2003 SU_{184}	—	September 21, 2003	Kitt Peak	Spacewatch	·	4.9 km	MPC · JPL
133418	2003 SO_{185}	—	September 22, 2003	Anderson Mesa	LONEOS	·	1.5 km	MPC · JPL
133419	2003 SE_{189}	—	September 22, 2003	Anderson Mesa	LONEOS	KOR	2.7 km	MPC · JPL
133420	2003 SR_{189}	—	September 23, 2003	Palomar	NEAT	·	5.5 km	MPC · JPL
133421	2003 SK_{190}	—	September 22, 2003	Desert Eagle	W. K. Y. Yeung	·	4.2 km	MPC · JPL
133422	2003 SL_{190}	—	September 22, 2003	Desert Eagle	W. K. Y. Yeung	KOR	2.8 km	MPC · JPL
133423	2003 SS_{190}	—	September 17, 2003	Kitt Peak	Spacewatch	·	3.6 km	MPC · JPL
133424	2003 SH_{192}	—	September 20, 2003	Campo Imperatore	CINEOS	·	4.1 km	MPC · JPL
133425	2003 SE_{194}	—	September 20, 2003	Haleakala	NEAT	·	4.7 km	MPC · JPL
133426	2003 SB_{196}	—	September 20, 2003	Palomar	NEAT	·	3.1 km	MPC · JPL
133427	2003 SU_{196}	—	September 20, 2003	Palomar	NEAT	·	5.6 km	MPC · JPL
133428	2003 SA_{199}	—	September 21, 2003	Anderson Mesa	LONEOS	(45637) · CYB	8.1 km	MPC · JPL
133429	2003 SR_{199}	—	September 21, 2003	Anderson Mesa	LONEOS	·	6.3 km	MPC · JPL
133430	2003 SC_{200}	—	September 21, 2003	Anderson Mesa	LONEOS	·	4.4 km	MPC · JPL
133431	2003 SF_{201}	—	September 23, 2003	Uccle	T. Pauwels	·	3.1 km	MPC · JPL
133432 Sarahnoble	2003 SB_{202}	Sarahnoble	September 22, 2003	Goodricke-Pigott	Reddy, V.	·	5.4 km	MPC · JPL
133433	2003 SP_{202}	—	September 22, 2003	Anderson Mesa	LONEOS	·	2.9 km	MPC · JPL
133434	2003 SQ_{203}	—	September 22, 2003	Palomar	NEAT	KOR	2.4 km	MPC · JPL
133435	2003 SX_{204}	—	September 22, 2003	Kitt Peak	Spacewatch	·	4.0 km	MPC · JPL
133436	2003 SU_{205}	—	September 25, 2003	Haleakala	NEAT	·	6.0 km	MPC · JPL
133437	2003 SJ_{207}	—	September 26, 2003	Socorro	LINEAR	·	3.9 km	MPC · JPL
133438	2003 SS_{207}	—	September 26, 2003	Socorro	LINEAR	THM	5.4 km	MPC · JPL
133439	2003 SE_{213}	—	September 26, 2003	Palomar	NEAT	EUN	2.6 km	MPC · JPL
133440	2003 SK_{213}	—	September 26, 2003	Socorro	LINEAR	NYS ·	3.0 km	MPC · JPL
133441	2003 SQ_{213}	—	September 26, 2003	Socorro	LINEAR	·	4.0 km	MPC · JPL
133442	2003 SV_{213}	—	September 26, 2003	Socorro	LINEAR	·	4.7 km	MPC · JPL
133443	2003 SP_{216}	—	September 26, 2003	Socorro	LINEAR	·	4.0 km	MPC · JPL
133444	2003 SF_{217}	—	September 27, 2003	Desert Eagle	W. K. Y. Yeung	·	7.4 km	MPC · JPL
133445	2003 SK_{220}	—	September 28, 2003	Desert Eagle	W. K. Y. Yeung	·	3.1 km	MPC · JPL
133446	2003 SM_{220}	—	September 29, 2003	Desert Eagle	W. K. Y. Yeung	·	3.9 km	MPC · JPL
133447	2003 SN_{220}	—	September 29, 2003	Desert Eagle	W. K. Y. Yeung	·	5.0 km	MPC · JPL
133448	2003 SL_{222}	—	September 27, 2003	Desert Eagle	W. K. Y. Yeung	THM	2.9 km	MPC · JPL
133449	2003 SE_{223}	—	September 28, 2003	Desert Eagle	W. K. Y. Yeung	KOR	2.8 km	MPC · JPL
133450	2003 SG_{223}	—	September 29, 2003	Desert Eagle	W. K. Y. Yeung	·	3.7 km	MPC · JPL
133451	2003 SV_{223}	—	September 29, 2003	Desert Eagle	W. K. Y. Yeung	·	2.5 km	MPC · JPL
133452	2003 SJ_{224}	—	September 25, 2003	Bergisch Gladbach	W. Bickel	·	3.9 km	MPC · JPL
133453	2003 SQ_{225}	—	September 26, 2003	Socorro	LINEAR	AGN	2.6 km	MPC · JPL
133454	2003 SN_{226}	—	September 26, 2003	Desert Eagle	W. K. Y. Yeung	AGN	2.1 km	MPC · JPL
133455	2003 SW_{226}	—	September 26, 2003	Socorro	LINEAR	·	7.6 km	MPC · JPL
133456	2003 SY_{227}	—	September 27, 2003	Socorro	LINEAR	NYS	1.7 km	MPC · JPL
133457	2003 SF_{229}	—	September 27, 2003	Kitt Peak	Spacewatch	·	6.1 km	MPC · JPL
133458	2003 SM_{229}	—	September 27, 2003	Kitt Peak	Spacewatch	EOS	3.4 km	MPC · JPL
133459	2003 SK_{230}	—	September 24, 2003	Palomar	NEAT	·	3.2 km	MPC · JPL
133460	2003 SM_{231}	—	September 24, 2003	Palomar	NEAT	MAR	1.8 km	MPC · JPL
133461	2003 SS_{231}	—	September 24, 2003	Palomar	NEAT	·	1.8 km	MPC · JPL
133462	2003 SL_{233}	—	September 25, 2003	Palomar	NEAT	·	2.7 km	MPC · JPL
133463	2003 SG_{235}	—	September 27, 2003	Kitt Peak	Spacewatch	·	4.3 km	MPC · JPL
133464	2003 SL_{235}	—	September 27, 2003	Socorro	LINEAR	·	2.5 km	MPC · JPL
133465	2003 SL_{238}	—	September 27, 2003	Socorro	LINEAR	·	2.5 km	MPC · JPL
133466	2003 SQ_{238}	—	September 27, 2003	Socorro	LINEAR	·	5.0 km	MPC · JPL
133467	2003 SL_{241}	—	September 27, 2003	Kitt Peak	Spacewatch	THM	3.0 km	MPC · JPL
133468	2003 SF_{245}	—	September 26, 2003	Socorro	LINEAR	·	3.0 km	MPC · JPL
133469	2003 SO_{247}	—	September 26, 2003	Socorro	LINEAR	THM	4.9 km	MPC · JPL
133470	2003 SJ_{248}	—	September 26, 2003	Socorro	LINEAR	NYS	1.5 km	MPC · JPL
133471	2003 SN_{249}	—	September 26, 2003	Socorro	LINEAR	·	2.7 km	MPC · JPL
133472	2003 SQ_{249}	—	September 26, 2003	Socorro	LINEAR	PAD	4.2 km	MPC · JPL
133473	2003 SB_{250}	—	September 26, 2003	Socorro	LINEAR	·	4.7 km	MPC · JPL
133474	2003 SW_{250}	—	September 26, 2003	Socorro	LINEAR	AGN	2.0 km	MPC · JPL
133475	2003 SJ_{251}	—	September 26, 2003	Socorro	LINEAR	·	4.8 km	MPC · JPL
133476	2003 SS_{251}	—	September 26, 2003	Socorro	LINEAR	·	2.5 km	MPC · JPL
133477	2003 SA_{255}	—	September 27, 2003	Kitt Peak	Spacewatch	EOS	2.6 km	MPC · JPL
133478	2003 SB_{255}	—	September 27, 2003	Kitt Peak	Spacewatch	KOR	2.0 km	MPC · JPL
133479	2003 SD_{255}	—	September 27, 2003	Kitt Peak	Spacewatch	·	2.9 km	MPC · JPL
133480	2003 SY_{255}	—	September 27, 2003	Kitt Peak	Spacewatch	·	7.6 km	MPC · JPL
133481	2003 SS_{256}	—	September 28, 2003	Kitt Peak	Spacewatch	·	4.3 km	MPC · JPL
133482	2003 SF_{257}	—	September 28, 2003	Socorro	LINEAR	·	4.7 km	MPC · JPL
133483	2003 SX_{257}	—	September 28, 2003	Socorro	LINEAR	NYS	3.0 km	MPC · JPL
133484	2003 SO_{259}	—	September 28, 2003	Kitt Peak	Spacewatch	·	4.0 km	MPC · JPL
133485	2003 SU_{262}	—	September 28, 2003	Socorro	LINEAR	NYS	2.0 km	MPC · JPL
133486	2003 SN_{266}	—	September 29, 2003	Socorro	LINEAR	·	2.7 km	MPC · JPL
133487	2003 SP_{266}	—	September 29, 2003	Socorro	LINEAR	·	3.4 km	MPC · JPL
133488	2003 SY_{266}	—	September 29, 2003	Socorro	LINEAR	KOR	2.4 km	MPC · JPL
133489	2003 SE_{268}	—	September 29, 2003	Kitt Peak	Spacewatch	·	3.1 km	MPC · JPL
133490	2003 SR_{271}	—	September 26, 2003	Socorro	LINEAR	·	3.2 km	MPC · JPL
133491	2003 SZ_{272}	—	September 27, 2003	Socorro	LINEAR	·	1.9 km	MPC · JPL
133492	2003 SN_{273}	—	September 27, 2003	Socorro	LINEAR	·	7.3 km	MPC · JPL
133493	2003 SM_{274}	—	September 28, 2003	Kitt Peak	Spacewatch	AGN	1.8 km	MPC · JPL
133494	2003 SK_{275}	—	September 29, 2003	Socorro	LINEAR	·	2.1 km	MPC · JPL
133495	2003 SW_{275}	—	September 29, 2003	Socorro	LINEAR	·	3.9 km	MPC · JPL
133496	2003 SC_{277}	—	September 30, 2003	Socorro	LINEAR	·	6.1 km	MPC · JPL
133497	2003 SE_{280}	—	September 18, 2003	Palomar	NEAT	·	6.7 km	MPC · JPL
133498	2003 ST_{280}	—	September 18, 2003	Socorro	LINEAR	·	3.5 km	MPC · JPL
133499	2003 SH_{282}	—	September 19, 2003	Anderson Mesa	LONEOS	·	3.0 km	MPC · JPL
133500	2003 SN_{282}	—	September 19, 2003	Anderson Mesa	LONEOS	MAS	1.2 km	MPC · JPL

== 133501–133600 ==
back to top

Designation			Discovery			Properties		Ref
Permanent	Provisional	Named after	Date	Site	Discoverer(s)	Category	Diam.	Ref
133501	2003 ST_{282}	—	September 19, 2003	Palomar	NEAT	·	3.6 km	MPC · JPL
133502	2003 SW_{283}	—	September 20, 2003	Socorro	LINEAR	·	5.2 km	MPC · JPL
133503	2003 SW_{288}	—	September 28, 2003	Socorro	LINEAR	ERI	3.0 km	MPC · JPL
133504	2003 SC_{290}	—	September 28, 2003	Anderson Mesa	LONEOS	·	2.9 km	MPC · JPL
133505	2003 SV_{290}	—	September 28, 2003	Kitt Peak	Spacewatch	HYG	3.1 km	MPC · JPL
133506	2003 SP_{293}	—	September 27, 2003	Socorro	LINEAR	·	2.4 km	MPC · JPL
133507	2003 SG_{294}	—	September 28, 2003	Socorro	LINEAR	BRA	2.2 km	MPC · JPL
133508	2003 SQ_{294}	—	September 28, 2003	Socorro	LINEAR	·	2.6 km	MPC · JPL
133509	2003 SC_{295}	—	September 28, 2003	Socorro	LINEAR	·	3.6 km	MPC · JPL
133510	2003 SU_{297}	—	September 18, 2003	Haleakala	NEAT	·	3.9 km	MPC · JPL
133511	2003 SV_{298}	—	September 18, 2003	Haleakala	NEAT	NYS	2.2 km	MPC · JPL
133512	2003 SY_{298}	—	September 29, 2003	Anderson Mesa	LONEOS	·	3.2 km	MPC · JPL
133513	2003 SV_{299}	—	September 16, 2003	Kitt Peak	Spacewatch	·	3.9 km	MPC · JPL
133514	2003 SJ_{303}	—	September 17, 2003	Palomar	NEAT	BRG	3.3 km	MPC · JPL
133515	2003 SU_{303}	—	September 17, 2003	Palomar	NEAT	MAS	1.0 km	MPC · JPL
133516	2003 SK_{304}	—	September 17, 2003	Palomar	NEAT	EOS	3.4 km	MPC · JPL
133517	2003 SM_{304}	—	September 17, 2003	Palomar	NEAT	·	5.4 km	MPC · JPL
133518	2003 SD_{306}	—	September 30, 2003	Socorro	LINEAR	·	5.3 km	MPC · JPL
133519	2003 SK_{306}	—	September 30, 2003	Socorro	LINEAR	JUN	2.5 km	MPC · JPL
133520	2003 SO_{308}	—	September 29, 2003	Anderson Mesa	LONEOS	·	4.8 km	MPC · JPL
133521	2003 SF_{310}	—	September 28, 2003	Socorro	LINEAR	·	1.4 km	MPC · JPL
133522	2003 SA_{311}	—	September 29, 2003	Socorro	LINEAR	·	2.4 km	MPC · JPL
133523	2003 SB_{311}	—	September 29, 2003	Socorro	LINEAR	·	3.1 km	MPC · JPL
133524	2003 SN_{311}	—	September 29, 2003	Socorro	LINEAR	·	6.4 km	MPC · JPL
133525	2003 SZ_{314}	—	September 16, 2003	Socorro	LINEAR	·	3.8 km	MPC · JPL
133526	2003 SE_{315}	—	September 25, 2003	Palomar	NEAT	·	3.6 km	MPC · JPL
133527 Fredearly	2003 TZ	Fredearly	October 5, 2003	Wrightwood	J. W. Young	·	3.8 km	MPC · JPL
133528 Ceragioli	2003 TC_{2}	Ceragioli	October 4, 2003	Junk Bond	D. Healy	KOR	2.6 km	MPC · JPL
133529	2003 TR_{2}	—	October 3, 2003	Haleakala	NEAT	·	3.8 km	MPC · JPL
133530	2003 TF_{5}	—	October 2, 2003	Kitt Peak	Spacewatch	·	2.0 km	MPC · JPL
133531	2003 TJ_{5}	—	October 2, 2003	Haleakala	NEAT	PHO	1.4 km	MPC · JPL
133532	2003 TK_{6}	—	October 1, 2003	Anderson Mesa	LONEOS	·	4.0 km	MPC · JPL
133533	2003 TR_{8}	—	October 2, 2003	Haleakala	NEAT	·	1.7 km	MPC · JPL
133534	2003 TC_{9}	—	October 4, 2003	Kitt Peak	Spacewatch	·	4.2 km	MPC · JPL
133535	2003 TJ_{9}	—	October 4, 2003	Kitt Peak	Spacewatch	EOS	4.1 km	MPC · JPL
133536 Alicewhagel	2003 TZ_{9}	Alicewhagel	October 15, 2003	Sandlot	Sandlot	·	3.9 km	MPC · JPL
133537 Mariomotta	2003 TL_{10}	Mariomotta	October 7, 2003	Schiaparelli	L. Buzzi	PHO	2.1 km	MPC · JPL
133538	2003 TW_{10}	—	October 15, 2003	Palomar	NEAT	·	3.4 km	MPC · JPL
133539	2003 TF_{11}	—	October 14, 2003	Anderson Mesa	LONEOS	·	2.6 km	MPC · JPL
133540	2003 TB_{12}	—	October 14, 2003	Anderson Mesa	LONEOS	·	4.0 km	MPC · JPL
133541	2003 TQ_{13}	—	October 3, 2003	Kitt Peak	Spacewatch	·	2.2 km	MPC · JPL
133542	2003 TS_{14}	—	October 14, 2003	Anderson Mesa	LONEOS	(5)	2.7 km	MPC · JPL
133543	2003 TY_{14}	—	October 15, 2003	Anderson Mesa	LONEOS	·	6.4 km	MPC · JPL
133544	2003 TD_{16}	—	October 15, 2003	Anderson Mesa	LONEOS	·	1.3 km	MPC · JPL
133545	2003 TB_{17}	—	October 14, 2003	Anderson Mesa	LONEOS	·	8.8 km	MPC · JPL
133546	2003 TR_{18}	—	October 15, 2003	Anderson Mesa	LONEOS	·	1.4 km	MPC · JPL
133547	2003 TW_{18}	—	October 15, 2003	Anderson Mesa	LONEOS	NYS	2.1 km	MPC · JPL
133548	2003 TN_{19}	—	October 15, 2003	Palomar	NEAT	KOR	2.2 km	MPC · JPL
133549	2003 TP_{21}	—	October 1, 2003	Anderson Mesa	LONEOS	URS	8.6 km	MPC · JPL
133550	2003 TG_{50}	—	October 3, 2003	Haleakala	NEAT	·	2.2 km	MPC · JPL
133551	2003 TU_{57}	—	October 15, 2003	Anderson Mesa	LONEOS	AGN	1.9 km	MPC · JPL
133552 Itting-Enke	2003 UJ_{4}	Itting-Enke	October 16, 2003	Mülheim-Ruhr	Star, Turtle	·	6.0 km	MPC · JPL
133553	2003 UF_{5}	—	October 16, 2003	Kitt Peak	Spacewatch	·	2.6 km	MPC · JPL
133554	2003 UN_{5}	—	October 18, 2003	Socorro	LINEAR	·	2.5 km	MPC · JPL
133555	2003 UO_{5}	—	October 16, 2003	Anderson Mesa	LONEOS	·	3.9 km	MPC · JPL
133556	2003 UP_{6}	—	October 18, 2003	Palomar	NEAT	·	7.6 km	MPC · JPL
133557	2003 UX_{6}	—	October 18, 2003	Palomar	NEAT	ADE	5.8 km	MPC · JPL
133558	2003 UP_{7}	—	October 16, 2003	Kingsnake	J. V. McClusky	·	5.4 km	MPC · JPL
133559	2003 UZ_{10}	—	October 16, 2003	Anderson Mesa	LONEOS	T_{j} (2.98) · 3:2	5.5 km	MPC · JPL
133560	2003 UW_{11}	—	October 16, 2003	Anderson Mesa	LONEOS	EOS	3.4 km	MPC · JPL
133561	2003 UK_{12}	—	October 21, 2003	Socorro	LINEAR	EOS	3.4 km	MPC · JPL
133562	2003 UE_{23}	—	October 21, 2003	Kitt Peak	Spacewatch	·	3.8 km	MPC · JPL
133563	2003 UN_{23}	—	October 22, 2003	Kitt Peak	Spacewatch	·	3.1 km	MPC · JPL
133564	2003 US_{26}	—	October 25, 2003	Goodricke-Pigott	R. A. Tucker	CYB	13 km	MPC · JPL
133565	2003 UE_{27}	—	October 23, 2003	Goodricke-Pigott	R. A. Tucker	·	4.2 km	MPC · JPL
133566	2003 UZ_{27}	—	October 26, 2003	Kitt Peak	Spacewatch	L5	19 km	MPC · JPL
133567	2003 UZ_{29}	—	October 21, 2003	Nashville	Clingan, R.	KOR	2.2 km	MPC · JPL
133568	2003 UO_{36}	—	October 16, 2003	Palomar	NEAT	·	2.5 km	MPC · JPL
133569	2003 US_{36}	—	October 16, 2003	Palomar	NEAT	·	4.4 km	MPC · JPL
133570	2003 UK_{37}	—	October 16, 2003	Črni Vrh	Mikuž, H.	·	6.3 km	MPC · JPL
133571	2003 UQ_{37}	—	October 17, 2003	Kitt Peak	Spacewatch	·	2.2 km	MPC · JPL
133572	2003 UO_{38}	—	October 17, 2003	Kitt Peak	Spacewatch	MAR	2.2 km	MPC · JPL
133573	2003 UQ_{39}	—	October 16, 2003	Kitt Peak	Spacewatch	·	6.0 km	MPC · JPL
133574	2003 UN_{48}	—	October 16, 2003	Anderson Mesa	LONEOS	HYG	6.6 km	MPC · JPL
133575	2003 UO_{48}	—	October 16, 2003	Anderson Mesa	LONEOS	(5)	2.1 km	MPC · JPL
133576	2003 UE_{49}	—	October 16, 2003	Anderson Mesa	LONEOS	THM	4.8 km	MPC · JPL
133577	2003 UB_{50}	—	October 16, 2003	Haleakala	NEAT	·	1.5 km	MPC · JPL
133578	2003 UY_{50}	—	October 18, 2003	Palomar	NEAT	·	2.0 km	MPC · JPL
133579	2003 UC_{53}	—	October 18, 2003	Palomar	NEAT	·	3.3 km	MPC · JPL
133580	2003 UA_{55}	—	October 18, 2003	Palomar	NEAT	·	3.8 km	MPC · JPL
133581	2003 UC_{55}	—	October 18, 2003	Palomar	NEAT	EUN	3.2 km	MPC · JPL
133582	2003 UF_{60}	—	October 17, 2003	Anderson Mesa	LONEOS	·	2.9 km	MPC · JPL
133583	2003 UN_{60}	—	October 17, 2003	Anderson Mesa	LONEOS	·	1.4 km	MPC · JPL
133584	2003 UD_{63}	—	October 16, 2003	Palomar	NEAT	·	3.4 km	MPC · JPL
133585	2003 UM_{63}	—	October 16, 2003	Palomar	NEAT	·	4.2 km	MPC · JPL
133586	2003 UH_{64}	—	October 16, 2003	Anderson Mesa	LONEOS	·	2.4 km	MPC · JPL
133587	2003 UL_{64}	—	October 16, 2003	Palomar	NEAT	V	1.1 km	MPC · JPL
133588	2003 UD_{65}	—	October 16, 2003	Palomar	NEAT	·	3.1 km	MPC · JPL
133589	2003 UQ_{66}	—	October 16, 2003	Palomar	NEAT	·	5.9 km	MPC · JPL
133590	2003 UB_{69}	—	October 18, 2003	Kitt Peak	Spacewatch	·	1.3 km	MPC · JPL
133591	2003 UA_{71}	—	October 18, 2003	Kitt Peak	Spacewatch	·	2.1 km	MPC · JPL
133592	2003 UR_{73}	—	October 19, 2003	Kitt Peak	Spacewatch	·	3.2 km	MPC · JPL
133593	2003 UL_{77}	—	October 17, 2003	Kitt Peak	Spacewatch	EOS	3.9 km	MPC · JPL
133594	2003 UX_{79}	—	October 18, 2003	Goodricke-Pigott	R. A. Tucker	GEF	2.4 km	MPC · JPL
133595	2003 US_{81}	—	October 16, 2003	Haleakala	NEAT	DOR	6.1 km	MPC · JPL
133596	2003 UX_{86}	—	October 18, 2003	Palomar	NEAT	·	7.2 km	MPC · JPL
133597	2003 UN_{88}	—	October 19, 2003	Anderson Mesa	LONEOS	LIX	6.1 km	MPC · JPL
133598	2003 UQ_{88}	—	October 19, 2003	Anderson Mesa	LONEOS	·	5.6 km	MPC · JPL
133599	2003 UX_{88}	—	October 19, 2003	Anderson Mesa	LONEOS	·	3.7 km	MPC · JPL
133600	2003 UY_{88}	—	October 19, 2003	Anderson Mesa	LONEOS	·	3.6 km	MPC · JPL

== 133601–133700 ==
back to top

Designation			Discovery			Properties		Ref
Permanent	Provisional	Named after	Date	Site	Discoverer(s)	Category	Diam.	Ref
133601	2003 UU_{90}	—	October 20, 2003	Socorro	LINEAR	·	2.8 km	MPC · JPL
133602	2003 UH_{92}	—	October 20, 2003	Palomar	NEAT	·	1.6 km	MPC · JPL
133603	2003 UZ_{94}	—	October 18, 2003	Kitt Peak	Spacewatch	·	1.8 km	MPC · JPL
133604	2003 UD_{95}	—	October 18, 2003	Kitt Peak	Spacewatch	EOS	3.4 km	MPC · JPL
133605	2003 UX_{95}	—	October 18, 2003	Kitt Peak	Spacewatch	EOS	3.2 km	MPC · JPL
133606	2003 US_{99}	—	October 19, 2003	Anderson Mesa	LONEOS	·	8.7 km	MPC · JPL
133607	2003 UF_{100}	—	October 19, 2003	Palomar	NEAT	V	1.1 km	MPC · JPL
133608	2003 UL_{100}	—	October 19, 2003	Palomar	NEAT	EUP	8.0 km	MPC · JPL
133609	2003 UA_{101}	—	October 20, 2003	Palomar	NEAT	THM	4.2 km	MPC · JPL
133610	2003 UZ_{102}	—	October 20, 2003	Kitt Peak	Spacewatch	KOR	2.8 km	MPC · JPL
133611	2003 UX_{109}	—	October 19, 2003	Kitt Peak	Spacewatch	·	1.3 km	MPC · JPL
133612	2003 UE_{110}	—	October 19, 2003	Kitt Peak	Spacewatch	·	1.9 km	MPC · JPL
133613	2003 UW_{110}	—	October 19, 2003	Kitt Peak	Spacewatch	·	2.5 km	MPC · JPL
133614	2003 UM_{112}	—	October 20, 2003	Socorro	LINEAR	T_{j} (2.98) · HIL · 3:2	8.2 km	MPC · JPL
133615	2003 UL_{113}	—	October 20, 2003	Socorro	LINEAR	·	2.3 km	MPC · JPL
133616	2003 US_{116}	—	October 21, 2003	Socorro	LINEAR	VER	7.1 km	MPC · JPL
133617	2003 UY_{116}	—	October 21, 2003	Socorro	LINEAR	·	2.4 km	MPC · JPL
133618	2003 UZ_{116}	—	October 21, 2003	Socorro	LINEAR	·	4.9 km	MPC · JPL
133619	2003 UT_{119}	—	October 18, 2003	Socorro	LINEAR	·	3.6 km	MPC · JPL
133620	2003 UU_{119}	—	October 18, 2003	Socorro	LINEAR	·	2.9 km	MPC · JPL
133621	2003 UD_{120}	—	October 18, 2003	Kitt Peak	Spacewatch	615	2.6 km	MPC · JPL
133622	2003 UP_{121}	—	October 19, 2003	Socorro	LINEAR	·	1.8 km	MPC · JPL
133623	2003 UA_{122}	—	October 19, 2003	Socorro	LINEAR	·	3.7 km	MPC · JPL
133624	2003 UP_{126}	—	October 20, 2003	Palomar	NEAT	EUN	2.5 km	MPC · JPL
133625	2003 UC_{129}	—	October 21, 2003	Kitt Peak	Spacewatch	·	2.5 km	MPC · JPL
133626	2003 UC_{130}	—	October 18, 2003	Palomar	NEAT	·	4.3 km	MPC · JPL
133627	2003 UX_{130}	—	October 19, 2003	Palomar	NEAT	·	3.2 km	MPC · JPL
133628	2003 UL_{131}	—	October 19, 2003	Palomar	NEAT	·	5.8 km	MPC · JPL
133629	2003 UZ_{134}	—	October 20, 2003	Palomar	NEAT	HYG	6.2 km	MPC · JPL
133630	2003 UM_{136}	—	October 21, 2003	Palomar	NEAT	·	2.6 km	MPC · JPL
133631	2003 UV_{137}	—	October 21, 2003	Socorro	LINEAR	·	2.9 km	MPC · JPL
133632	2003 UA_{141}	—	October 17, 2003	Socorro	LINEAR	·	2.3 km	MPC · JPL
133633	2003 UN_{141}	—	October 18, 2003	Anderson Mesa	LONEOS	·	1.4 km	MPC · JPL
133634	2003 UZ_{142}	—	October 18, 2003	Anderson Mesa	LONEOS	EOS	4.0 km	MPC · JPL
133635	2003 UN_{143}	—	October 18, 2003	Anderson Mesa	LONEOS	·	1.4 km	MPC · JPL
133636	2003 UB_{144}	—	October 18, 2003	Anderson Mesa	LONEOS	·	3.2 km	MPC · JPL
133637	2003 UG_{144}	—	October 18, 2003	Anderson Mesa	LONEOS	·	10 km	MPC · JPL
133638	2003 UP_{145}	—	October 18, 2003	Anderson Mesa	LONEOS	·	3.0 km	MPC · JPL
133639	2003 UL_{146}	—	October 18, 2003	Anderson Mesa	LONEOS	·	2.9 km	MPC · JPL
133640	2003 UZ_{146}	—	October 18, 2003	Anderson Mesa	LONEOS	(5)	3.0 km	MPC · JPL
133641	2003 UF_{147}	—	October 18, 2003	Anderson Mesa	LONEOS	EOS	4.9 km	MPC · JPL
133642	2003 UG_{147}	—	October 18, 2003	Anderson Mesa	LONEOS	BRA	3.2 km	MPC · JPL
133643	2003 US_{147}	—	October 18, 2003	Kitt Peak	Spacewatch	·	7.2 km	MPC · JPL
133644	2003 UJ_{148}	—	October 19, 2003	Anderson Mesa	LONEOS	·	3.4 km	MPC · JPL
133645	2003 UN_{149}	—	October 20, 2003	Socorro	LINEAR	·	3.3 km	MPC · JPL
133646	2003 UV_{151}	—	October 21, 2003	Socorro	LINEAR	(12739)	3.4 km	MPC · JPL
133647	2003 UK_{152}	—	October 21, 2003	Kitt Peak	Spacewatch	·	1.2 km	MPC · JPL
133648	2003 UE_{155}	—	October 20, 2003	Socorro	LINEAR	·	3.5 km	MPC · JPL
133649	2003 UF_{155}	—	October 20, 2003	Socorro	LINEAR	·	3.2 km	MPC · JPL
133650	2003 UM_{161}	—	October 21, 2003	Palomar	NEAT	·	3.6 km	MPC · JPL
133651	2003 UY_{163}	—	October 21, 2003	Socorro	LINEAR	·	4.4 km	MPC · JPL
133652	2003 UD_{164}	—	October 21, 2003	Socorro	LINEAR	·	5.3 km	MPC · JPL
133653	2003 UU_{165}	—	October 21, 2003	Kitt Peak	Spacewatch	·	3.6 km	MPC · JPL
133654	2003 UL_{167}	—	October 22, 2003	Socorro	LINEAR	·	2.5 km	MPC · JPL
133655	2003 UC_{168}	—	October 22, 2003	Socorro	LINEAR	·	3.9 km	MPC · JPL
133656	2003 UP_{169}	—	October 22, 2003	Socorro	LINEAR	·	2.5 km	MPC · JPL
133657	2003 US_{169}	—	October 22, 2003	Haleakala	NEAT	HYG	5.9 km	MPC · JPL
133658	2003 UZ_{169}	—	October 22, 2003	Haleakala	NEAT	·	3.3 km	MPC · JPL
133659	2003 UH_{174}	—	October 21, 2003	Kitt Peak	Spacewatch	·	3.2 km	MPC · JPL
133660	2003 UD_{175}	—	October 21, 2003	Kitt Peak	Spacewatch	·	4.7 km	MPC · JPL
133661	2003 UP_{175}	—	October 21, 2003	Anderson Mesa	LONEOS	·	1.6 km	MPC · JPL
133662	2003 UV_{176}	—	October 21, 2003	Anderson Mesa	LONEOS	·	2.9 km	MPC · JPL
133663	2003 UP_{179}	—	October 21, 2003	Socorro	LINEAR	·	3.7 km	MPC · JPL
133664	2003 UQ_{182}	—	October 21, 2003	Palomar	NEAT	·	3.8 km	MPC · JPL
133665	2003 UE_{184}	—	October 21, 2003	Palomar	NEAT	·	3.7 km	MPC · JPL
133666	2003 UD_{185}	—	October 21, 2003	Palomar	NEAT	·	4.5 km	MPC · JPL
133667	2003 UQ_{185}	—	October 21, 2003	Kitt Peak	Spacewatch	·	2.7 km	MPC · JPL
133668	2003 UR_{186}	—	October 22, 2003	Kitt Peak	Spacewatch	·	7.7 km	MPC · JPL
133669	2003 US_{186}	—	October 22, 2003	Kitt Peak	Spacewatch	GEF	2.4 km	MPC · JPL
133670	2003 UU_{186}	—	October 22, 2003	Kitt Peak	Spacewatch	·	2.6 km	MPC · JPL
133671	2003 UR_{188}	—	October 22, 2003	Kitt Peak	Spacewatch	·	6.9 km	MPC · JPL
133672	2003 UR_{189}	—	October 22, 2003	Kitt Peak	Spacewatch	·	3.7 km	MPC · JPL
133673	2003 UY_{190}	—	October 23, 2003	Anderson Mesa	LONEOS	·	2.6 km	MPC · JPL
133674	2003 UL_{192}	—	October 23, 2003	Anderson Mesa	LONEOS	·	4.3 km	MPC · JPL
133675	2003 UO_{193}	—	October 20, 2003	Socorro	LINEAR	·	2.3 km	MPC · JPL
133676	2003 UG_{197}	—	October 21, 2003	Kitt Peak	Spacewatch	·	3.5 km	MPC · JPL
133677	2003 UN_{197}	—	October 21, 2003	Anderson Mesa	LONEOS	AGN	1.8 km	MPC · JPL
133678	2003 UW_{197}	—	October 21, 2003	Anderson Mesa	LONEOS	KOR	2.4 km	MPC · JPL
133679	2003 UY_{197}	—	October 21, 2003	Anderson Mesa	LONEOS	·	3.3 km	MPC · JPL
133680	2003 US_{198}	—	October 21, 2003	Kitt Peak	Spacewatch	·	3.6 km	MPC · JPL
133681	2003 UO_{199}	—	October 21, 2003	Socorro	LINEAR	·	3.2 km	MPC · JPL
133682	2003 UR_{199}	—	October 21, 2003	Socorro	LINEAR	·	4.3 km	MPC · JPL
133683	2003 UZ_{199}	—	October 21, 2003	Socorro	LINEAR	·	6.4 km	MPC · JPL
133684	2003 UZ_{202}	—	October 21, 2003	Palomar	NEAT	(43176)	4.9 km	MPC · JPL
133685	2003 UB_{203}	—	October 21, 2003	Palomar	NEAT	PAD	2.9 km	MPC · JPL
133686	2003 UD_{205}	—	October 22, 2003	Kitt Peak	Spacewatch	·	2.1 km	MPC · JPL
133687	2003 UR_{206}	—	October 22, 2003	Socorro	LINEAR	·	5.2 km	MPC · JPL
133688	2003 UX_{206}	—	October 22, 2003	Socorro	LINEAR	·	4.9 km	MPC · JPL
133689	2003 UD_{213}	—	October 23, 2003	Haleakala	NEAT	·	5.1 km	MPC · JPL
133690	2003 UN_{216}	—	October 21, 2003	Socorro	LINEAR	·	1.4 km	MPC · JPL
133691	2003 UG_{217}	—	October 21, 2003	Socorro	LINEAR	·	4.0 km	MPC · JPL
133692	2003 UN_{217}	—	October 21, 2003	Socorro	LINEAR	·	5.9 km	MPC · JPL
133693	2003 UC_{220}	—	October 21, 2003	Socorro	LINEAR	·	6.2 km	MPC · JPL
133694	2003 UK_{221}	—	October 22, 2003	Socorro	LINEAR	·	2.6 km	MPC · JPL
133695	2003 UF_{223}	—	October 22, 2003	Socorro	LINEAR	EOS	3.5 km	MPC · JPL
133696	2003 UN_{223}	—	October 22, 2003	Socorro	LINEAR	NEM	5.1 km	MPC · JPL
133697	2003 UE_{226}	—	October 22, 2003	Socorro	LINEAR	BRA	3.4 km	MPC · JPL
133698	2003 UB_{227}	—	October 23, 2003	Kitt Peak	Spacewatch	·	7.2 km	MPC · JPL
133699	2003 UG_{227}	—	October 23, 2003	Kitt Peak	Spacewatch	·	2.9 km	MPC · JPL
133700	2003 UV_{227}	—	October 23, 2003	Kitt Peak	Spacewatch	HYG	5.2 km	MPC · JPL

== 133701–133800 ==
back to top

Designation			Discovery			Properties		Ref
Permanent	Provisional	Named after	Date	Site	Discoverer(s)	Category	Diam.	Ref
133701	2003 UD_{230}	—	October 23, 2003	Kitt Peak	Spacewatch	·	2.7 km	MPC · JPL
133702	2003 UF_{231}	—	October 24, 2003	Socorro	LINEAR	·	4.6 km	MPC · JPL
133703	2003 UY_{231}	—	October 24, 2003	Kitt Peak	Spacewatch	·	4.6 km	MPC · JPL
133704	2003 UK_{234}	—	October 24, 2003	Kitt Peak	Spacewatch	AGN	1.5 km	MPC · JPL
133705	2003 US_{238}	—	October 24, 2003	Socorro	LINEAR	KOR	2.2 km	MPC · JPL
133706	2003 UP_{242}	—	October 24, 2003	Socorro	LINEAR	·	1.2 km	MPC · JPL
133707	2003 UW_{243}	—	October 24, 2003	Socorro	LINEAR	EOS	4.2 km	MPC · JPL
133708	2003 UM_{245}	—	October 24, 2003	Socorro	LINEAR	·	4.9 km	MPC · JPL
133709	2003 UX_{245}	—	October 24, 2003	Socorro	LINEAR	THM	5.2 km	MPC · JPL
133710	2003 UJ_{247}	—	October 24, 2003	Kitt Peak	Spacewatch	AST	3.4 km	MPC · JPL
133711	2003 UP_{247}	—	October 24, 2003	Socorro	LINEAR	·	5.1 km	MPC · JPL
133712	2003 UH_{248}	—	October 25, 2003	Socorro	LINEAR	·	2.4 km	MPC · JPL
133713	2003 UO_{248}	—	October 25, 2003	Kitt Peak	Spacewatch	slow	3.7 km	MPC · JPL
133714	2003 US_{248}	—	October 25, 2003	Socorro	LINEAR	·	5.3 km	MPC · JPL
133715	2003 UG_{250}	—	October 25, 2003	Socorro	LINEAR	·	4.9 km	MPC · JPL
133716 Tomtourville	2003 UW_{251}	Tomtourville	October 26, 2003	Catalina	CSS	KOR	2.9 km	MPC · JPL
133717	2003 UG_{253}	—	October 27, 2003	Socorro	LINEAR	THM	4.4 km	MPC · JPL
133718	2003 UY_{256}	—	October 25, 2003	Socorro	LINEAR	·	6.5 km	MPC · JPL
133719	2003 UG_{259}	—	October 25, 2003	Socorro	LINEAR	·	3.6 km	MPC · JPL
133720	2003 UJ_{259}	—	October 25, 2003	Socorro	LINEAR	·	3.1 km	MPC · JPL
133721	2003 UB_{260}	—	October 25, 2003	Socorro	LINEAR	·	7.4 km	MPC · JPL
133722	2003 UF_{261}	—	October 26, 2003	Kitt Peak	Spacewatch	·	4.0 km	MPC · JPL
133723	2003 UM_{261}	—	October 26, 2003	Kitt Peak	Spacewatch	EOS	3.1 km	MPC · JPL
133724	2003 US_{262}	—	October 26, 2003	Haleakala	NEAT	KOR	2.3 km	MPC · JPL
133725	2003 UJ_{263}	—	October 27, 2003	Socorro	LINEAR	·	4.7 km	MPC · JPL
133726 Gateswest	2003 UM_{269}	Gateswest	October 29, 2003	Catalina	CSS	·	6.2 km	MPC · JPL
133727	2003 UD_{270}	—	October 28, 2003	Bergisch Gladbach	W. Bickel	·	5.3 km	MPC · JPL
133728	2003 UO_{270}	—	October 17, 2003	Palomar	NEAT	AGN	2.1 km	MPC · JPL
133729	2003 UC_{273}	—	October 29, 2003	Socorro	LINEAR	KOR	2.4 km	MPC · JPL
133730	2003 UV_{273}	—	October 29, 2003	Kitt Peak	Spacewatch	·	5.1 km	MPC · JPL
133731	2003 UF_{275}	—	October 29, 2003	Socorro	LINEAR	·	3.2 km	MPC · JPL
133732	2003 UK_{275}	—	October 29, 2003	Socorro	LINEAR	·	3.1 km	MPC · JPL
133733	2003 UP_{275}	—	October 29, 2003	Socorro	LINEAR	·	3.4 km	MPC · JPL
133734	2003 UZ_{282}	—	October 29, 2003	Anderson Mesa	LONEOS	·	3.0 km	MPC · JPL
133735	2003 UB_{296}	—	October 16, 2003	Kitt Peak	Spacewatch	·	3.0 km	MPC · JPL
133736	2003 VZ_{1}	—	November 2, 2003	Socorro	LINEAR	KOR	2.7 km	MPC · JPL
133737	2003 VY_{4}	—	November 15, 2003	Kitt Peak	Spacewatch	·	5.0 km	MPC · JPL
133738	2003 VG_{5}	—	November 12, 2003	Haleakala	NEAT	·	4.6 km	MPC · JPL
133739	2003 VT_{6}	—	November 15, 2003	Kitt Peak	Spacewatch	·	5.0 km	MPC · JPL
133740	2003 VT_{7}	—	November 15, 2003	Palomar	NEAT	·	3.3 km	MPC · JPL
133741	2003 VU_{7}	—	November 2, 2003	Socorro	LINEAR	ANF	2.6 km	MPC · JPL
133742	2003 VJ_{9}	—	November 15, 2003	Palomar	NEAT	KOR	2.5 km	MPC · JPL
133743 Robertwoodward	2003 WM	Robertwoodward	November 16, 2003	Catalina	CSS	·	6.5 km	MPC · JPL
133744 Dellagiustina	2003 WD_{1}	Dellagiustina	November 16, 2003	Catalina	CSS	·	3.0 km	MPC · JPL
133745 Danieldrinnon	2003 WG_{1}	Danieldrinnon	November 16, 2003	Catalina	CSS	KOR	2.2 km	MPC · JPL
133746 Tonyferro	2003 WL_{1}	Tonyferro	November 16, 2003	Catalina	CSS	AGN	2.0 km	MPC · JPL
133747 Robertofurfaro	2003 WX_{3}	Robertofurfaro	November 16, 2003	Catalina	CSS	·	4.5 km	MPC · JPL
133748	2003 WA_{5}	—	November 16, 2003	Kitt Peak	Spacewatch	·	6.0 km	MPC · JPL
133749	2003 WX_{6}	—	November 18, 2003	Palomar	NEAT	·	4.0 km	MPC · JPL
133750	2003 WZ_{9}	—	November 18, 2003	Kitt Peak	Spacewatch	·	2.6 km	MPC · JPL
133751	2003 WV_{17}	—	November 18, 2003	Kitt Peak	Spacewatch	·	7.5 km	MPC · JPL
133752	2003 WE_{23}	—	November 18, 2003	Kitt Peak	Spacewatch	·	3.9 km	MPC · JPL
133753 Teresamullen	2003 WU_{25}	Teresamullen	November 21, 2003	Junk Bond	D. Healy	THM	3.9 km	MPC · JPL
133754	2003 WJ_{27}	—	November 16, 2003	Kitt Peak	Spacewatch	HYG	4.6 km	MPC · JPL
133755	2003 WB_{31}	—	November 18, 2003	Palomar	NEAT	·	4.9 km	MPC · JPL
133756 Carinajohnson	2003 WB_{36}	Carinajohnson	November 19, 2003	Catalina	CSS	·	2.6 km	MPC · JPL
133757	2003 WC_{43}	—	November 17, 2003	Catalina	CSS	BRA	3.4 km	MPC · JPL
133758	2003 WF_{44}	—	November 19, 2003	Palomar	NEAT	EUN	2.6 km	MPC · JPL
133759	2003 WC_{49}	—	November 19, 2003	Kitt Peak	Spacewatch	·	2.9 km	MPC · JPL
133760	2003 WC_{58}	—	November 18, 2003	Kitt Peak	Spacewatch	·	3.8 km	MPC · JPL
133761	2003 WN_{58}	—	November 18, 2003	Kitt Peak	Spacewatch	THM	3.3 km	MPC · JPL
133762	2003 WQ_{60}	—	November 19, 2003	Kitt Peak	Spacewatch	TIR	5.4 km	MPC · JPL
133763	2003 WZ_{61}	—	November 19, 2003	Kitt Peak	Spacewatch	·	2.4 km	MPC · JPL
133764	2003 WJ_{62}	—	November 19, 2003	Kitt Peak	Spacewatch	·	5.7 km	MPC · JPL
133765	2003 WC_{65}	—	November 19, 2003	Kitt Peak	Spacewatch	THM	5.0 km	MPC · JPL
133766	2003 WZ_{67}	—	November 19, 2003	Kitt Peak	Spacewatch	·	3.6 km	MPC · JPL
133767	2003 WO_{68}	—	November 19, 2003	Kitt Peak	Spacewatch	VER	4.4 km	MPC · JPL
133768	2003 WL_{69}	—	November 19, 2003	Kitt Peak	Spacewatch	CYB	6.9 km	MPC · JPL
133769	2003 WW_{72}	—	November 20, 2003	Socorro	LINEAR	·	4.4 km	MPC · JPL
133770	2003 WM_{76}	—	November 19, 2003	Socorro	LINEAR	·	4.7 km	MPC · JPL
133771	2003 WW_{76}	—	November 19, 2003	Palomar	NEAT	·	3.2 km	MPC · JPL
133772	2003 WK_{79}	—	November 20, 2003	Socorro	LINEAR	·	6.4 km	MPC · JPL
133773 Lindsaykeller	2003 WQ_{84}	Lindsaykeller	November 19, 2003	Catalina	CSS	·	6.0 km	MPC · JPL
133774 Johnkidd	2003 WX_{88}	Johnkidd	November 16, 2003	Catalina	CSS	·	2.5 km	MPC · JPL
133775	2003 WC_{91}	—	November 18, 2003	Kitt Peak	Spacewatch	·	3.8 km	MPC · JPL
133776	2003 WV_{92}	—	November 19, 2003	Anderson Mesa	LONEOS	·	6.7 km	MPC · JPL
133777	2003 WP_{95}	—	November 19, 2003	Anderson Mesa	LONEOS	·	3.8 km	MPC · JPL
133778	2003 WF_{97}	—	November 19, 2003	Anderson Mesa	LONEOS	EUN	2.0 km	MPC · JPL
133779	2003 WR_{97}	—	November 19, 2003	Anderson Mesa	LONEOS	·	2.0 km	MPC · JPL
133780	2003 WA_{98}	—	November 19, 2003	Anderson Mesa	LONEOS	LUT	9.8 km	MPC · JPL
133781	2003 WP_{98}	—	November 20, 2003	Socorro	LINEAR	·	3.9 km	MPC · JPL
133782 Saraknutson	2003 WY_{98}	Saraknutson	November 20, 2003	Catalina	CSS	·	2.4 km	MPC · JPL
133783	2003 WP_{103}	—	November 21, 2003	Socorro	LINEAR	·	5.8 km	MPC · JPL
133784	2003 WB_{104}	—	November 21, 2003	Socorro	LINEAR	EOS	4.1 km	MPC · JPL
133785	2003 WM_{104}	—	November 21, 2003	Socorro	LINEAR	·	4.6 km	MPC · JPL
133786	2003 WD_{117}	—	November 20, 2003	Socorro	LINEAR	·	5.0 km	MPC · JPL
133787	2003 WK_{117}	—	November 20, 2003	Socorro	LINEAR	EOS	4.1 km	MPC · JPL
133788	2003 WD_{119}	—	November 20, 2003	Socorro	LINEAR	·	4.3 km	MPC · JPL
133789	2003 WS_{122}	—	November 20, 2003	Socorro	LINEAR	·	4.7 km	MPC · JPL
133790	2003 WT_{122}	—	November 20, 2003	Socorro	LINEAR	·	5.6 km	MPC · JPL
133791	2003 WS_{123}	—	November 20, 2003	Socorro	LINEAR	·	6.6 km	MPC · JPL
133792	2003 WZ_{125}	—	November 20, 2003	Socorro	LINEAR	EUN	2.8 km	MPC · JPL
133793	2003 WV_{128}	—	November 21, 2003	Socorro	LINEAR	·	3.6 km	MPC · JPL
133794	2003 WL_{130}	—	November 21, 2003	Socorro	LINEAR	·	5.2 km	MPC · JPL
133795	2003 WN_{132}	—	November 19, 2003	Kitt Peak	Spacewatch	THM	5.3 km	MPC · JPL
133796	2003 WS_{132}	—	November 21, 2003	Socorro	LINEAR	·	5.7 km	MPC · JPL
133797	2003 WS_{133}	—	November 21, 2003	Socorro	LINEAR	·	4.8 km	MPC · JPL
133798	2003 WF_{135}	—	November 21, 2003	Socorro	LINEAR	·	4.9 km	MPC · JPL
133799	2003 WV_{138}	—	November 21, 2003	Socorro	LINEAR	·	9.1 km	MPC · JPL
133800	2003 WA_{139}	—	November 21, 2003	Socorro	LINEAR	·	4.8 km	MPC · JPL

== 133801–133900 ==
back to top

Designation			Discovery			Properties		Ref
Permanent	Provisional	Named after	Date	Site	Discoverer(s)	Category	Diam.	Ref
133801	2003 WE_{141}	—	November 21, 2003	Socorro	LINEAR	TIR	8.9 km	MPC · JPL
133802	2003 WM_{144}	—	November 21, 2003	Socorro	LINEAR	·	4.4 km	MPC · JPL
133803	2003 WW_{147}	—	November 23, 2003	Kitt Peak	Spacewatch	·	5.1 km	MPC · JPL
133804	2003 WO_{149}	—	November 24, 2003	Palomar	NEAT	·	6.3 km	MPC · JPL
133805	2003 WW_{150}	—	November 24, 2003	Anderson Mesa	LONEOS	HYG	7.6 km	MPC · JPL
133806	2003 WU_{151}	—	November 26, 2003	Kitt Peak	Spacewatch	·	3.0 km	MPC · JPL
133807 Johnphelps	2003 WQ_{152}	Johnphelps	November 24, 2003	Desert Moon	Stevens, B. L.	·	3.4 km	MPC · JPL
133808	2003 WB_{153}	—	November 26, 2003	Anderson Mesa	LONEOS	·	3.1 km	MPC · JPL
133809	2003 WE_{153}	—	November 26, 2003	Anderson Mesa	LONEOS	·	3.1 km	MPC · JPL
133810	2003 WE_{156}	—	November 29, 2003	Socorro	LINEAR	EUN	2.1 km	MPC · JPL
133811	2003 WW_{157}	—	November 26, 2003	Moonedge	Schiralli Jr., F.	GEF	4.1 km	MPC · JPL
133812	2003 WF_{167}	—	November 19, 2003	Kitt Peak	Spacewatch	HOF	4.4 km	MPC · JPL
133813	2003 WJ_{167}	—	November 19, 2003	Socorro	LINEAR	·	6.6 km	MPC · JPL
133814 Wenjengko	2003 WG_{170}	Wenjengko	November 20, 2003	Catalina	CSS	·	5.3 km	MPC · JPL
133815	2003 WE_{172}	—	November 30, 2003	Socorro	LINEAR	EOS	3.8 km	MPC · JPL
133816	2003 WQ_{172}	—	November 30, 2003	Kitt Peak	Spacewatch	·	4.4 km	MPC · JPL
133817	2003 WH_{173}	—	November 18, 2003	Palomar	NEAT	·	4.7 km	MPC · JPL
133818	2003 WQ_{190}	—	November 29, 2003	Socorro	LINEAR	·	4.4 km	MPC · JPL
133819	2003 XS	—	December 3, 2003	Socorro	LINEAR	·	2.2 km	MPC · JPL
133820	2003 XU_{2}	—	December 1, 2003	Socorro	LINEAR	·	2.5 km	MPC · JPL
133821	2003 XN_{3}	—	December 1, 2003	Socorro	LINEAR	·	8.1 km	MPC · JPL
133822	2003 XJ_{4}	—	December 1, 2003	Socorro	LINEAR	EOS	3.9 km	MPC · JPL
133823	2003 XL_{4}	—	December 1, 2003	Socorro	LINEAR	·	7.1 km	MPC · JPL
133824	2003 XS_{4}	—	December 1, 2003	Socorro	LINEAR	EOS	4.4 km	MPC · JPL
133825	2003 XF_{7}	—	December 4, 2003	Socorro	LINEAR	·	1.6 km	MPC · JPL
133826	2003 XC_{13}	—	December 14, 2003	Kitt Peak	Spacewatch	(1118)	10 km	MPC · JPL
133827	2003 XK_{13}	—	December 14, 2003	Palomar	NEAT	·	1.9 km	MPC · JPL
133828	2003 XK_{28}	—	December 1, 2003	Kitt Peak	Spacewatch	·	3.3 km	MPC · JPL
133829	2003 XG_{29}	—	December 1, 2003	Kitt Peak	Spacewatch	KOR	2.1 km	MPC · JPL
133830	2003 XE_{32}	—	December 1, 2003	Kitt Peak	Spacewatch	THM	3.1 km	MPC · JPL
133831	2003 XV_{37}	—	December 4, 2003	Socorro	LINEAR	·	2.3 km	MPC · JPL
133832 Loveridge	2003 XJ_{39}	Loveridge	December 5, 2003	Catalina	CSS	·	5.9 km	MPC · JPL
133833	2003 XM_{39}	—	December 5, 2003	Socorro	LINEAR	·	7.9 km	MPC · JPL
133834 Erinmorton	2003 YX_{3}	Erinmorton	December 16, 2003	Catalina	CSS	·	5.4 km	MPC · JPL
133835	2003 YL_{4}	—	December 16, 2003	Kitt Peak	Spacewatch	·	4.6 km	MPC · JPL
133836	2003 YW_{10}	—	December 17, 2003	Socorro	LINEAR	·	5.7 km	MPC · JPL
133837	2003 YX_{18}	—	December 17, 2003	Anderson Mesa	LONEOS	·	4.7 km	MPC · JPL
133838	2003 YH_{27}	—	December 16, 2003	Črni Vrh	Mikuž, H.	·	6.0 km	MPC · JPL
133839	2003 YH_{48}	—	December 18, 2003	Socorro	LINEAR	THM	5.3 km	MPC · JPL
133840	2003 YT_{48}	—	December 18, 2003	Socorro	LINEAR	·	3.1 km	MPC · JPL
133841	2003 YA_{54}	—	December 19, 2003	Kitt Peak	Spacewatch	·	4.5 km	MPC · JPL
133842	2003 YY_{55}	—	December 19, 2003	Socorro	LINEAR	·	4.7 km	MPC · JPL
133843	2003 YZ_{59}	—	December 19, 2003	Kitt Peak	Spacewatch	EUN	2.2 km	MPC · JPL
133844	2003 YK_{60}	—	December 19, 2003	Kitt Peak	Spacewatch	·	5.7 km	MPC · JPL
133845	2003 YL_{63}	—	December 19, 2003	Socorro	LINEAR	·	7.3 km	MPC · JPL
133846	2003 YD_{71}	—	December 18, 2003	Socorro	LINEAR	EOS	4.7 km	MPC · JPL
133847	2003 YL_{77}	—	December 18, 2003	Socorro	LINEAR	·	5.3 km	MPC · JPL
133848	2003 YB_{78}	—	December 18, 2003	Socorro	LINEAR	EOS	4.2 km	MPC · JPL
133849	2003 YY_{78}	—	December 18, 2003	Socorro	LINEAR	·	2.9 km	MPC · JPL
133850 Heatherroper	2003 YN_{83}	Heatherroper	December 19, 2003	Catalina	CSS	·	4.8 km	MPC · JPL
133851	2003 YK_{90}	—	December 19, 2003	Kitt Peak	Spacewatch	·	6.2 km	MPC · JPL
133852	2003 YX_{101}	—	December 19, 2003	Socorro	LINEAR	·	7.9 km	MPC · JPL
133853	2003 YQ_{133}	—	December 28, 2003	Socorro	LINEAR	L5	16 km	MPC · JPL
133854 Wargetz	2003 YO_{149}	Wargetz	December 29, 2003	Catalina	CSS	EUN	2.1 km	MPC · JPL
133855	2003 YC_{164}	—	December 17, 2003	Kitt Peak	Spacewatch	EOS	4.1 km	MPC · JPL
133856	2003 YA_{176}	—	December 24, 2003	Haleakala	NEAT	·	3.4 km	MPC · JPL
133857	2004 AB_{1}	—	January 5, 2004	Socorro	LINEAR	·	4.5 km	MPC · JPL
133858	2004 AG_{1}	—	January 12, 2004	Palomar	NEAT	·	9.7 km	MPC · JPL
133859	2004 AS_{4}	—	January 12, 2004	Palomar	NEAT	·	6.0 km	MPC · JPL
133860	2004 BT_{21}	—	January 19, 2004	Anderson Mesa	LONEOS	·	4.6 km	MPC · JPL
133861 Debrawilmer	2004 BO_{25}	Debrawilmer	January 19, 2004	Catalina	CSS	·	6.7 km	MPC · JPL
133862	2004 BR_{38}	—	January 20, 2004	Socorro	LINEAR	L5	17 km	MPC · JPL
133863	2004 BE_{39}	—	January 21, 2004	Socorro	LINEAR	EOS	3.4 km	MPC · JPL
133864	2004 BA_{44}	—	January 22, 2004	Socorro	LINEAR	·	1.3 km	MPC · JPL
133865	2004 BT_{69}	—	January 20, 2004	Socorro	LINEAR	TIR	6.7 km	MPC · JPL
133866	2004 BW_{80}	—	January 25, 2004	Haleakala	NEAT	·	7.7 km	MPC · JPL
133867	2004 BX_{110}	—	January 28, 2004	Kitt Peak	Spacewatch	EUN · slow	5.8 km	MPC · JPL
133868	2004 FD_{30}	—	March 18, 2004	Palomar	NEAT	·	8.2 km	MPC · JPL
133869	2004 FD_{45}	—	March 16, 2004	Socorro	LINEAR	·	3.9 km	MPC · JPL
133870	2004 HR_{28}	—	April 20, 2004	Socorro	LINEAR	MRX	2.1 km	MPC · JPL
133871	2004 JC_{23}	—	May 12, 2004	Siding Spring	SSS	NEM	3.1 km	MPC · JPL
133872	2004 KZ_{5}	—	May 17, 2004	Socorro	LINEAR	KON	3.2 km	MPC · JPL
133873	2004 LB_{26}	—	June 15, 2004	Socorro	LINEAR	·	3.3 km	MPC · JPL
133874 Jonnazucarelli	2004 MD_{3}	Jonnazucarelli	June 17, 2004	Catalina	CSS	H	1.2 km	MPC · JPL
133875	2004 NH_{12}	—	July 11, 2004	Socorro	LINEAR	·	1.9 km	MPC · JPL
133876	2004 PT_{2}	—	August 8, 2004	Socorro	LINEAR	H	1.1 km	MPC · JPL
133877	2004 PQ_{13}	—	August 7, 2004	Palomar	NEAT	·	1.9 km	MPC · JPL
133878	2004 PX_{55}	—	August 8, 2004	Anderson Mesa	LONEOS	·	1.5 km	MPC · JPL
133879	2004 PT_{71}	—	August 8, 2004	Socorro	LINEAR	·	2.8 km	MPC · JPL
133880	2004 PA_{83}	—	August 10, 2004	Socorro	LINEAR	·	1.3 km	MPC · JPL
133881	2004 PQ_{85}	—	August 10, 2004	Socorro	LINEAR	NYS	1.8 km	MPC · JPL
133882	2004 PQ_{86}	—	August 11, 2004	Socorro	LINEAR	·	3.3 km	MPC · JPL
133883	2004 PA_{90}	—	August 10, 2004	Socorro	LINEAR	·	1.3 km	MPC · JPL
133884	2004 PK_{91}	—	August 11, 2004	Socorro	LINEAR	·	7.0 km	MPC · JPL
133885	2004 PU_{101}	—	August 11, 2004	Socorro	LINEAR	·	4.4 km	MPC · JPL
133886	2004 PV_{101}	—	August 11, 2004	Socorro	LINEAR	·	4.9 km	MPC · JPL
133887	2004 PY_{102}	—	August 12, 2004	Socorro	LINEAR	·	3.4 km	MPC · JPL
133888	2004 QZ_{4}	—	August 21, 2004	Goodricke-Pigott	R. A. Tucker	·	1.8 km	MPC · JPL
133889 Nicholasmills	2004 QD_{9}	Nicholasmills	August 20, 2004	Catalina	CSS	PHO	1.9 km	MPC · JPL
133890	2004 QL_{17}	—	August 25, 2004	Socorro	LINEAR	H	990 m	MPC · JPL
133891 Jaesubhong	2004 QY_{20}	Jaesubhong	August 20, 2004	Catalina	CSS	·	2.1 km	MPC · JPL
133892 Benkhaldoun	2004 RN_{8}	Benkhaldoun	September 7, 2004	Ottmarsheim	C. Rinner	(194)	2.5 km	MPC · JPL
133893	2004 RT_{19}	—	September 7, 2004	Kitt Peak	Spacewatch	·	950 m	MPC · JPL
133894	2004 RZ_{25}	—	September 4, 2004	Palomar	NEAT	·	1.3 km	MPC · JPL
133895	2004 RK_{35}	—	September 7, 2004	Socorro	LINEAR	·	1.2 km	MPC · JPL
133896	2004 RT_{35}	—	September 7, 2004	Socorro	LINEAR	·	3.5 km	MPC · JPL
133897	2004 RE_{42}	—	September 7, 2004	Kitt Peak	Spacewatch	·	1.5 km	MPC · JPL
133898	2004 RH_{59}	—	September 8, 2004	Socorro	LINEAR	·	1.3 km	MPC · JPL
133899	2004 RU_{63}	—	September 8, 2004	Socorro	LINEAR	slow	1.7 km	MPC · JPL
133900	2004 RL_{66}	—	September 8, 2004	Socorro	LINEAR	·	2.0 km	MPC · JPL

== 133901–134000 ==
back to top

Designation			Discovery			Properties		Ref
Permanent	Provisional	Named after	Date	Site	Discoverer(s)	Category	Diam.	Ref
133901	2004 RM_{81}	—	September 8, 2004	Socorro	LINEAR	NYS ·	2.8 km	MPC · JPL
133902	2004 RX_{84}	—	September 10, 2004	Socorro	LINEAR	H	1.2 km	MPC · JPL
133903	2004 RH_{85}	—	September 7, 2004	Bergisch Gladbach	W. Bickel	·	1.4 km	MPC · JPL
133904	2004 RA_{99}	—	September 8, 2004	Socorro	LINEAR	·	3.8 km	MPC · JPL
133905	2004 RC_{100}	—	September 8, 2004	Socorro	LINEAR	·	2.3 km	MPC · JPL
133906	2004 RA_{106}	—	September 8, 2004	Palomar	NEAT	·	1.0 km	MPC · JPL
133907	2004 RX_{107}	—	September 9, 2004	Socorro	LINEAR	·	1.7 km	MPC · JPL
133908	2004 RE_{113}	—	September 6, 2004	Socorro	LINEAR	·	10 km	MPC · JPL
133909	2004 RH_{151}	—	September 9, 2004	Socorro	LINEAR	V	1.2 km	MPC · JPL
133910	2004 RW_{173}	—	September 10, 2004	Socorro	LINEAR	·	2.1 km	MPC · JPL
133911	2004 RU_{195}	—	September 10, 2004	Socorro	LINEAR	H	740 m	MPC · JPL
133912	2004 RG_{198}	—	September 10, 2004	Socorro	LINEAR	·	1.6 km	MPC · JPL
133913	2004 RT_{199}	—	September 10, 2004	Socorro	LINEAR	·	4.1 km	MPC · JPL
133914	2004 RE_{200}	—	September 10, 2004	Socorro	LINEAR	·	3.6 km	MPC · JPL
133915	2004 RC_{201}	—	September 10, 2004	Socorro	LINEAR	EUP	7.5 km	MPC · JPL
133916	2004 RM_{228}	—	September 9, 2004	Kitt Peak	Spacewatch	·	1.6 km	MPC · JPL
133917	2004 RD_{246}	—	September 10, 2004	Socorro	LINEAR	·	1.4 km	MPC · JPL
133918	2004 RG_{279}	—	September 15, 2004	Kitt Peak	Spacewatch	·	1.4 km	MPC · JPL
133919	2004 RW_{289}	—	September 8, 2004	Socorro	LINEAR	H	1.1 km	MPC · JPL
133920	2004 RH_{310}	—	September 13, 2004	Kitt Peak	Spacewatch	EOS	4.1 km	MPC · JPL
133921	2004 RJ_{315}	—	September 15, 2004	Kitt Peak	Spacewatch	·	4.3 km	MPC · JPL
133922	2004 RW_{338}	—	September 9, 2004	Palomar	NEAT	H	940 m	MPC · JPL
133923	2004 SD_{14}	—	September 17, 2004	Socorro	LINEAR	·	4.5 km	MPC · JPL
133924	2004 SX_{23}	—	September 17, 2004	Kitt Peak	Spacewatch	·	1.1 km	MPC · JPL
133925	2004 SN_{28}	—	September 17, 2004	Socorro	LINEAR	·	3.2 km	MPC · JPL
133926	2004 SB_{31}	—	September 17, 2004	Socorro	LINEAR	·	1.1 km	MPC · JPL
133927	2004 SG_{33}	—	September 17, 2004	Socorro	LINEAR	·	2.7 km	MPC · JPL
133928	2004 SR_{38}	—	September 17, 2004	Socorro	LINEAR	·	1.6 km	MPC · JPL
133929	2004 SM_{39}	—	September 17, 2004	Socorro	LINEAR	·	2.7 km	MPC · JPL
133930	2004 ST_{40}	—	September 17, 2004	Socorro	LINEAR	·	1.7 km	MPC · JPL
133931	2004 SE_{49}	—	September 21, 2004	Socorro	LINEAR	·	6.3 km	MPC · JPL
133932	2004 SD_{53}	—	September 22, 2004	Socorro	LINEAR	·	1.7 km	MPC · JPL
133933	2004 ST_{54}	—	September 22, 2004	Socorro	LINEAR	·	2.4 km	MPC · JPL
133934	2004 TQ	—	October 4, 2004	Anderson Mesa	LONEOS	·	1.3 km	MPC · JPL
133935	2004 TK_{1}	—	October 4, 2004	Goodricke-Pigott	R. A. Tucker	·	5.2 km	MPC · JPL
133936	2004 TQ_{8}	—	October 6, 2004	Socorro	LINEAR	H	1.1 km	MPC · JPL
133937	2004 TA_{13}	—	October 4, 2004	Anderson Mesa	LONEOS	H	940 m	MPC · JPL
133938	2004 TE_{16}	—	October 12, 2004	Socorro	LINEAR	T_{j} (2.93)	5.4 km	MPC · JPL
133939	2004 TR_{39}	—	October 4, 2004	Kitt Peak	Spacewatch	·	830 m	MPC · JPL
133940	2004 TM_{48}	—	October 4, 2004	Kitt Peak	Spacewatch	·	1.3 km	MPC · JPL
133941	2004 TD_{54}	—	October 4, 2004	Kitt Peak	Spacewatch	·	1.8 km	MPC · JPL
133942	2004 TR_{54}	—	October 4, 2004	Kitt Peak	Spacewatch	PHO	2.2 km	MPC · JPL
133943	2004 TB_{58}	—	October 5, 2004	Kitt Peak	Spacewatch	MAS	1.0 km	MPC · JPL
133944	2004 TN_{68}	—	October 5, 2004	Anderson Mesa	LONEOS	TEL	2.2 km	MPC · JPL
133945	2004 TF_{69}	—	October 5, 2004	Anderson Mesa	LONEOS	·	1.1 km	MPC · JPL
133946	2004 TV_{71}	—	October 6, 2004	Kitt Peak	Spacewatch	·	1.3 km	MPC · JPL
133947	2004 TX_{71}	—	October 6, 2004	Kitt Peak	Spacewatch	V	1.3 km	MPC · JPL
133948	2004 TD_{72}	—	October 6, 2004	Kitt Peak	Spacewatch	·	1.7 km	MPC · JPL
133949	2004 TC_{75}	—	October 6, 2004	Kitt Peak	Spacewatch	·	2.1 km	MPC · JPL
133950	2004 TK_{79}	—	October 4, 2004	Socorro	LINEAR	·	5.3 km	MPC · JPL
133951	2004 TA_{100}	—	October 5, 2004	Kitt Peak	Spacewatch	NYS	1.5 km	MPC · JPL
133952	2004 TN_{111}	—	October 7, 2004	Socorro	LINEAR	·	2.9 km	MPC · JPL
133953	2004 TR_{112}	—	October 7, 2004	Socorro	LINEAR	·	7.7 km	MPC · JPL
133954	2004 TC_{124}	—	October 7, 2004	Socorro	LINEAR	·	1.8 km	MPC · JPL
133955	2004 TS_{127}	—	October 7, 2004	Socorro	LINEAR	·	2.3 km	MPC · JPL
133956	2004 TZ_{131}	—	October 7, 2004	Anderson Mesa	LONEOS	(2076)	1.2 km	MPC · JPL
133957	2004 TL_{132}	—	October 7, 2004	Palomar	NEAT	·	3.1 km	MPC · JPL
133958	2004 TB_{133}	—	October 7, 2004	Anderson Mesa	LONEOS	·	4.6 km	MPC · JPL
133959	2004 TX_{133}	—	October 7, 2004	Palomar	NEAT	·	1.2 km	MPC · JPL
133960	2004 TK_{134}	—	October 7, 2004	Palomar	NEAT	·	3.4 km	MPC · JPL
133961	2004 TP_{135}	—	October 8, 2004	Anderson Mesa	LONEOS	·	2.1 km	MPC · JPL
133962	2004 TT_{136}	—	October 8, 2004	Anderson Mesa	LONEOS	·	3.3 km	MPC · JPL
133963	2004 TU_{139}	—	October 9, 2004	Anderson Mesa	LONEOS	·	4.5 km	MPC · JPL
133964	2004 TB_{153}	—	October 6, 2004	Kitt Peak	Spacewatch	·	800 m	MPC · JPL
133965	2004 TU_{153}	—	October 6, 2004	Kitt Peak	Spacewatch	·	1.7 km	MPC · JPL
133966	2004 TN_{158}	—	October 6, 2004	Kitt Peak	Spacewatch	·	3.9 km	MPC · JPL
133967	2004 TM_{193}	—	October 7, 2004	Kitt Peak	Spacewatch	·	1.9 km	MPC · JPL
133968	2004 TA_{203}	—	October 7, 2004	Kitt Peak	Spacewatch	·	1.9 km	MPC · JPL
133969	2004 TX_{203}	—	October 7, 2004	Kitt Peak	Spacewatch	(5)	2.9 km	MPC · JPL
133970	2004 TN_{204}	—	October 7, 2004	Kitt Peak	Spacewatch	·	2.8 km	MPC · JPL
133971	2004 TJ_{207}	—	October 7, 2004	Kitt Peak	Spacewatch	·	2.2 km	MPC · JPL
133972	2004 TL_{207}	—	October 7, 2004	Kitt Peak	Spacewatch	·	1.6 km	MPC · JPL
133973	2004 TO_{207}	—	October 7, 2004	Kitt Peak	Spacewatch	·	2.0 km	MPC · JPL
133974	2004 TL_{208}	—	October 7, 2004	Kitt Peak	Spacewatch	·	2.5 km	MPC · JPL
133975	2004 TJ_{216}	—	October 9, 2004	Anderson Mesa	LONEOS	·	2.3 km	MPC · JPL
133976	2004 TM_{219}	—	October 5, 2004	Kitt Peak	Spacewatch	(5)	1.5 km	MPC · JPL
133977	2004 TW_{241}	—	October 10, 2004	Socorro	LINEAR	·	6.1 km	MPC · JPL
133978	2004 TK_{242}	—	October 6, 2004	Anderson Mesa	LONEOS	·	1.2 km	MPC · JPL
133979	2004 TC_{243}	—	October 6, 2004	Socorro	LINEAR	·	5.1 km	MPC · JPL
133980	2004 TF_{255}	—	October 9, 2004	Kitt Peak	Spacewatch	(5)	1.7 km	MPC · JPL
133981	2004 TZ_{263}	—	October 9, 2004	Kitt Peak	Spacewatch	·	1.1 km	MPC · JPL
133982	2004 TX_{268}	—	October 9, 2004	Kitt Peak	Spacewatch	LIX	5.0 km	MPC · JPL
133983	2004 TV_{282}	—	October 7, 2004	Anderson Mesa	LONEOS	·	1.8 km	MPC · JPL
133984	2004 TW_{295}	—	October 10, 2004	Kitt Peak	Spacewatch	·	1.3 km	MPC · JPL
133985	2004 TQ_{321}	—	October 11, 2004	Kitt Peak	Spacewatch	BRG	2.2 km	MPC · JPL
133986	2004 TE_{333}	—	October 9, 2004	Kitt Peak	Spacewatch	·	2.7 km	MPC · JPL
133987	2004 TQ_{336}	—	October 10, 2004	Kitt Peak	Spacewatch	·	2.5 km	MPC · JPL
133988	2004 TB_{339}	—	October 12, 2004	Anderson Mesa	LONEOS	TIR	4.0 km	MPC · JPL
133989	2004 TL_{351}	—	October 10, 2004	Kitt Peak	Spacewatch	·	1.8 km	MPC · JPL
133990	2004 TZ_{356}	—	October 14, 2004	Anderson Mesa	LONEOS	·	4.4 km	MPC · JPL
133991	2004 TY_{359}	—	October 9, 2004	Kitt Peak	Spacewatch	·	1.2 km	MPC · JPL
133992	2004 UN_{4}	—	October 16, 2004	Socorro	LINEAR	·	2.5 km	MPC · JPL
133993	2004 US_{6}	—	October 20, 2004	Socorro	LINEAR	·	1.8 km	MPC · JPL
133994	2004 VU_{1}	—	November 2, 2004	Anderson Mesa	LONEOS	·	1.1 km	MPC · JPL
133995	2004 VV_{1}	—	November 2, 2004	Anderson Mesa	LONEOS	·	1.7 km	MPC · JPL
133996	2004 VN_{6}	—	November 3, 2004	Kitt Peak	Spacewatch	MAS	1.2 km	MPC · JPL
133997	2004 VV_{6}	—	November 3, 2004	Kitt Peak	Spacewatch	NYS	1.6 km	MPC · JPL
133998	2004 VE_{7}	—	November 3, 2004	Kitt Peak	Spacewatch	·	1.0 km	MPC · JPL
133999	2004 VK_{7}	—	November 3, 2004	Kitt Peak	Spacewatch	NYS	1.7 km	MPC · JPL
134000	2004 VG_{9}	—	November 3, 2004	Anderson Mesa	LONEOS	EOS	3.9 km	MPC · JPL

back to top

== See also ==
- Meanings of minor-planet names: 133001–134000
