= Stephanie Snedden =

American astronomer

Stephanie A. Snedden is an American astronomer at the Apache Point Observatory of the New Mexico State University in New Mexico, United States. The minor planet 133008 Snedden is named after her; it was discovered by the Sloan Digital Sky Survey at Apache Point Observatory on 5 October 2002. She has published papers including The Case for Optically Thick High-Velocity Broad-Line Region Gas in Active Galactic Nuclei.

== Education ==
Snedden gained her BS from Sonoma State University in 1983, her MS in physics and astronomy from the University of Nebraska–Lincoln in 1995, and her PhD from the University of Nebraska–Lincoln in 2001.

== Research interests ==
Snedden studies the physics of active galactic nuclei, particularly the structure and kinematics of gas in the broad-line region.

== Media ==
Snedden appeared on Nova, in the 13 April 2010 documentary Hunting the Edge of Space: The Ever-Expanding Universe.

== Bibliography ==
- Ahn, Christopher P.; Alexandroff, Rachael; Snedden, Stephanie A.; et al. (April 2014). "The Tenth Data Release of the Sloan Digital Sky Survey: First Spectroscopic Data from the SDSS-III Apache Point Observatory Galactic Evolution Experiment". The Astrophysical Journal Supplement Series. 211 (2): 17. arXiv:1307.7735. Bibcode:2014ApJS..211...17A. doi:10.1088/0067-0049/211/2/17. S2CID 7356513.
- Snedden, Stephanie A.; Gaskell, C. Martin (November 2007). "The Case for Optically Thick High-Velocity Broad-Line Region Gas in Active Galactic Nuclei". The Astrophysical Journal. 669 (1): 126–134. arXiv:astro-ph/0402508. Bibcode:2007ApJ...669..126S. doi:10.1086/521290. S2CID 14545422.
- Naohisa, Inada; Masamune, Oguri; Snedden, Stephanie A.; et al. (April 2006). "SDSS J0806+2006 and SDSS J1353+1138: Two New Gravitationally Lensed Quasars from the Sloan Digital Sky Survey". The Astronomical Journal. 131 (4): 1934–1941. arXiv:astro-ph/0512239. Bibcode:2006AJ....131.1934I. doi:10.1086/500591. S2CID 903067.
- Schmidt, Edward G.; Lee, Kevin M.; Snedden, Stephanie A.; et al. (August 2003). "The Spectra of Type II Cepheids. I. The Hα Line in Short-Period Stars". The Astronomical Journal. 126 (2): 906–917. Bibcode:2003AJ....126..906S. doi:10.1086/376845.
