= 133528 Ceragioli =

Asteroid

Discovery
- Discovered by: D. Healy
- Discovery site: Junk Bond Obs.
- Discovery date: 4 October 2003

Designations
- Named after: Roger Ceragioli (American optician)
- Alternative designations: 2003 TC_{2}
- Minor planet category: main-belt · (outer); Koronis

Orbital characteristics
- Epoch 27 April 2019 (JD 2458600.5)
- Uncertainty parameter 0
- Observation arc: 17.73 yr (6,476 d)
- Aphelion: 3.1087 AU
- Perihelion: 2.6053 AU
- Semi-major axis: 2.8570 AU
- Eccentricity: 0.0881
- Orbital period (sidereal): 4.83 yr (1,764 d)
- Mean anomaly: 92.922°
- Mean motion: 0° 12^{m} 14.76^{s} / day
- Inclination: 1.2673°
- Longitude of ascending node: 334.80°
- Argument of perihelion: 21.722°

Physical characteristics
- Mean diameter: 1.75 km (calculated)
- Synodic rotation period: 3.052±0.0159 h
- Geometric albedo: 0.24 (assumed)
- Spectral type: S (assumed)
- Absolute magnitude (H): 15.498±0.008 (R); 15.5

133528 Ceragioli (provisional designation 2003 TC_{2}) is an asteroid of the Koronis family from the outer regions of the asteroid belt, approximately 1.75 kilometers (1.1 miles) in diameter. It was discovered on 4 October 2003 by American astronomer David Healy at the Junk Bond Observatory in Arizona, United States. The likely stony and possibly elongated asteroid has a rotation period of 3.1 hours. It was named for American optician Roger Ceragioli.

== Orbit and classification ==
Ceragioli is a member of the Koronis family (605), a very large asteroid family with nearly co-planar ecliptical orbits and named after 158 Koronis. It orbits the Sun in the outer asteroid belt at a distance of 2.6–3.1 AU once every 4 years and 10 months (1,764 days; semi-major axis of 2.86 AU). Its orbit has an eccentricity of 0.09 and an inclination of 1° with respect to the ecliptic. The body's observation arc begins with a precovery taken by Spacewatch in September 1998, or 5 years prior to its official discovery observation at the Junk Bond Observatory.

== Naming ==
This minor planet was named after American optician Roger Ceragioli (born 1959) at the Steward Observatory Mirror Laboratory, whose projects include parts of the Bok Telescope and the MODS spectrograph for the Large Binocular Telescope. The official naming citation was published by the Minor Planet Center on 1 June 2007 (M.P.C. 59925).

== Physical characteristics ==
Ceragioli is an assumed stony S-type asteroid, in line with the overall spectral type for members of the Koronis family.

=== Rotation period ===
In February 2010, a rotational lightcurve of Ceragioli was obtained from photometric observations in the R-band by astronomers at the Palomar Transient Factory in California. Lightcurve analysis gave a rotation period of 3.052±0.0159 hours with a brightness variation of 0.35 magnitude (U=2), indicative of an elongated shape. Also in February 2010, David Polishook determined a similar period of 3.06±0.04 hours with an amplitude of 0.25 magnitude (U=1+).

=== Diameter and albedo ===
The Collaborative Asteroid Lightcurve Link assumes an albedo of 0.24 and calculates a diameter of 1.75 kilometers based on an absolute magnitude of 15.95.
