= List of minor planets: 430001–431000 =

The following is a partial list of minor planets, running from minor-planet number 430001 through 431000, inclusive. The primary data for this and other partial lists is based on JPL's "Small-Body Orbital Elements" and data available from the Minor Planet Center. Critical list information is also provided by the MPC, unless otherwise specified from Lowell Observatory. A detailed description of the table's columns and additional sources are given on the main page including a complete list of every page in this series, and a statistical break-up on the dynamical classification of minor planets.

Also see the summary list of all named bodies in numerical and alphabetical order, and the corresponding naming citations for the number range of this particular list. New namings may only be added to this list after official publication, as the preannouncement of names is condemned by the Working Group for Small Bodies Nomenclature of the International Astronomical Union.

Near-Earth obj.	MBA (inner)	MBA (outer)	Centaur
Mars-crosser	MBA (middle)	Jupiter trojan	Trans-Neptunian obj.
Unclassified

== 430001–430100 ==
Designation			Discovery			Properties		Ref
Permanent	Provisional	Named after	Date	Site	Discoverer(s)	Category	Diam.	Ref
430001	2013 QV_{45}	—	October 24, 2009	Kitt Peak	Spacewatch	·	940 m	MPC · JPL
430002	2013 QP_{47}	—	September 23, 2008	Mount Lemmon	Mount Lemmon Survey	·	2.1 km	MPC · JPL
430003	2013 QY_{66}	—	November 20, 2006	Kitt Peak	Spacewatch	·	890 m	MPC · JPL
430004	2013 QZ_{66}	—	October 6, 2004	Kitt Peak	Spacewatch	·	1.4 km	MPC · JPL
430005	2013 QG_{72}	—	November 29, 2003	Kitt Peak	Spacewatch	·	800 m	MPC · JPL
430006	2013 QN_{73}	—	February 28, 2008	Kitt Peak	Spacewatch	·	770 m	MPC · JPL
430007	2013 QF_{74}	—	January 13, 2011	Mount Lemmon	Mount Lemmon Survey	V	740 m	MPC · JPL
430008	2013 QP_{74}	—	October 12, 2010	Mount Lemmon	Mount Lemmon Survey	·	610 m	MPC · JPL
430009	2013 QU_{81}	—	August 28, 2006	Kitt Peak	Spacewatch	·	730 m	MPC · JPL
430010	2013 QB_{82}	—	October 24, 2003	Kitt Peak	Spacewatch	·	590 m	MPC · JPL
430011	2013 QK_{90}	—	January 30, 2011	Mount Lemmon	Mount Lemmon Survey	·	1.7 km	MPC · JPL
430012	2013 QZ_{92}	—	August 28, 2005	Kitt Peak	Spacewatch	KRM	1.6 km	MPC · JPL
430013	2013 RC	—	April 30, 2003	Kitt Peak	Spacewatch	·	1.8 km	MPC · JPL
430014	2013 RY	—	January 26, 2007	Kitt Peak	Spacewatch	·	1.2 km	MPC · JPL
430015	2013 RT_{3}	—	September 1, 2013	Mount Lemmon	Mount Lemmon Survey	·	1.5 km	MPC · JPL
430016	2013 RP_{4}	—	September 22, 2000	Kitt Peak	Spacewatch	·	640 m	MPC · JPL
430017	2013 RD_{12}	—	January 13, 2011	Mount Lemmon	Mount Lemmon Survey	PHO	780 m	MPC · JPL
430018	2013 RT_{23}	—	January 27, 2007	Kitt Peak	Spacewatch	NYS	1.4 km	MPC · JPL
430019	2013 RK_{24}	—	December 20, 2009	Mount Lemmon	Mount Lemmon Survey	·	2.0 km	MPC · JPL
430020	2013 RP_{25}	—	January 7, 2006	Kitt Peak	Spacewatch	·	1.3 km	MPC · JPL
430021	2013 RH_{28}	—	October 4, 1999	Kitt Peak	Spacewatch	GEF	1.2 km	MPC · JPL
430022	2013 RO_{28}	—	September 4, 2013	Mount Lemmon	Mount Lemmon Survey	KOR	1.4 km	MPC · JPL
430023	2013 RH_{32}	—	October 24, 2008	Catalina	CSS	·	2.2 km	MPC · JPL
430024	2013 RR_{33}	—	January 7, 2006	Kitt Peak	Spacewatch	EUN	1.2 km	MPC · JPL
430025	2013 RN_{34}	—	December 15, 2006	Kitt Peak	Spacewatch	·	1.0 km	MPC · JPL
430026	2013 RR_{36}	—	December 13, 2006	Mount Lemmon	Mount Lemmon Survey	·	1.2 km	MPC · JPL
430027	2013 RD_{41}	—	November 21, 2006	Mount Lemmon	Mount Lemmon Survey	MAS	800 m	MPC · JPL
430028	2013 RE_{49}	—	February 17, 2010	Kitt Peak	Spacewatch	·	2.8 km	MPC · JPL
430029	2013 RB_{52}	—	February 8, 2002	Kitt Peak	Spacewatch	·	2.0 km	MPC · JPL
430030	2013 RP_{53}	—	February 26, 2012	Mount Lemmon	Mount Lemmon Survey	V	550 m	MPC · JPL
430031	2013 RY_{59}	—	January 19, 2012	Mount Lemmon	Mount Lemmon Survey	·	1.0 km	MPC · JPL
430032	2013 RE_{60}	—	February 9, 2008	Kitt Peak	Spacewatch	·	810 m	MPC · JPL
430033	2013 RO_{62}	—	January 1, 2008	Kitt Peak	Spacewatch	·	690 m	MPC · JPL
430034	2013 RE_{69}	—	November 20, 2003	Kitt Peak	Spacewatch	EOS	2.1 km	MPC · JPL
430035	2013 RJ_{69}	—	January 19, 2004	Kitt Peak	Spacewatch	·	3.1 km	MPC · JPL
430036	2013 RN_{69}	—	November 21, 2009	Mount Lemmon	Mount Lemmon Survey	·	1.7 km	MPC · JPL
430037	2013 RW_{71}	—	October 23, 2009	Kitt Peak	Spacewatch	·	1.5 km	MPC · JPL
430038	2013 RY_{78}	—	September 30, 2006	Catalina	CSS	·	780 m	MPC · JPL
430039	2013 RA_{80}	—	October 21, 2009	Mount Lemmon	Mount Lemmon Survey	·	1.3 km	MPC · JPL
430040	2013 RH_{83}	—	March 4, 2005	Mount Lemmon	Mount Lemmon Survey	·	3.5 km	MPC · JPL
430041	2013 RK_{83}	—	February 16, 2007	Catalina	CSS	MAR	1.4 km	MPC · JPL
430042	2013 RN_{83}	—	September 13, 2013	Kitt Peak	Spacewatch	·	1.2 km	MPC · JPL
430043	2013 RK_{85}	—	March 12, 2007	Kitt Peak	Spacewatch	·	1.5 km	MPC · JPL
430044	2013 RV_{86}	—	March 4, 2006	Kitt Peak	Spacewatch	·	1.9 km	MPC · JPL
430045	2013 RX_{86}	—	March 15, 2012	Kitt Peak	Spacewatch	·	970 m	MPC · JPL
430046	2013 RR_{87}	—	January 30, 2006	Kitt Peak	Spacewatch	·	1.9 km	MPC · JPL
430047	2013 RB_{88}	—	September 11, 2004	Kitt Peak	Spacewatch	·	1.7 km	MPC · JPL
430048	2013 RF_{88}	—	September 11, 2010	Mount Lemmon	Mount Lemmon Survey	·	650 m	MPC · JPL
430049	2013 RS_{88}	—	February 25, 2011	Mount Lemmon	Mount Lemmon Survey	·	1.9 km	MPC · JPL
430050	2013 RL_{92}	—	August 31, 2005	Kitt Peak	Spacewatch	·	1.2 km	MPC · JPL
430051	2013 RR_{93}	—	February 25, 2006	Mount Lemmon	Mount Lemmon Survey	AGN	1.0 km	MPC · JPL
430052	2013 RP_{95}	—	December 19, 2003	Socorro	LINEAR	·	1.3 km	MPC · JPL
430053	2013 RZ_{96}	—	September 6, 2008	Mount Lemmon	Mount Lemmon Survey	·	3.7 km	MPC · JPL
430054	2013 RC_{97}	—	September 9, 2004	Socorro	LINEAR	·	1.6 km	MPC · JPL
430055	2013 SL_{15}	—	April 19, 2007	Mount Lemmon	Mount Lemmon Survey	AGN	1.3 km	MPC · JPL
430056	2013 SG_{22}	—	October 3, 2000	Socorro	LINEAR	EUN	1.3 km	MPC · JPL
430057	2013 SJ_{22}	—	November 19, 2008	Kitt Peak	Spacewatch	·	2.7 km	MPC · JPL
430058	2013 SK_{22}	—	November 17, 2009	Mount Lemmon	Mount Lemmon Survey	·	1.9 km	MPC · JPL
430059	2013 SN_{26}	—	February 3, 2010	WISE	WISE	·	2.8 km	MPC · JPL
430060	2013 SB_{27}	—	December 22, 2008	Mount Lemmon	Mount Lemmon Survey	·	2.4 km	MPC · JPL
430061	2013 SS_{27}	—	December 21, 2008	Kitt Peak	Spacewatch	·	3.4 km	MPC · JPL
430062	2013 SC_{28}	—	February 12, 2004	Kitt Peak	Spacewatch	·	3.0 km	MPC · JPL
430063	2013 SE_{30}	—	November 30, 2003	Kitt Peak	Spacewatch	·	710 m	MPC · JPL
430064	2013 SQ_{31}	—	September 28, 2006	Mount Lemmon	Mount Lemmon Survey	NYS	1.4 km	MPC · JPL
430065	2013 SL_{32}	—	October 15, 1998	Kitt Peak	Spacewatch	·	1.1 km	MPC · JPL
430066	2013 SM_{35}	—	November 20, 2006	Kitt Peak	Spacewatch	·	1.5 km	MPC · JPL
430067	2013 SQ_{36}	—	January 10, 2000	Kitt Peak	Spacewatch	KOR	1.5 km	MPC · JPL
430068	2013 SC_{37}	—	January 23, 2011	Mount Lemmon	Mount Lemmon Survey	·	1.1 km	MPC · JPL
430069	2013 SF_{37}	—	March 29, 2010	WISE	WISE	DOR	2.2 km	MPC · JPL
430070	2013 SU_{37}	—	February 9, 2002	Kitt Peak	Spacewatch	·	1.4 km	MPC · JPL
430071	2013 ST_{38}	—	September 11, 2010	Mount Lemmon	Mount Lemmon Survey	·	740 m	MPC · JPL
430072	2013 SG_{39}	—	August 28, 2006	Catalina	CSS	·	720 m	MPC · JPL
430073	2013 SQ_{42}	—	September 20, 2008	Catalina	CSS	·	4.1 km	MPC · JPL
430074	2013 SE_{43}	—	September 19, 2006	Catalina	CSS	V	650 m	MPC · JPL
430075	2013 SP_{43}	—	September 5, 2013	Catalina	CSS	·	2.2 km	MPC · JPL
430076	2013 SU_{46}	—	September 24, 2008	Kitt Peak	Spacewatch	·	2.0 km	MPC · JPL
430077	2013 ST_{48}	—	September 21, 2009	Mount Lemmon	Mount Lemmon Survey	EUN	1.1 km	MPC · JPL
430078	2013 SE_{49}	—	March 14, 2004	Kitt Peak	Spacewatch	·	2.6 km	MPC · JPL
430079	2013 SG_{50}	—	September 8, 2008	Siding Spring	SSS	·	3.1 km	MPC · JPL
430080	2013 SZ_{50}	—	August 26, 2009	Catalina	CSS	NYS	1.0 km	MPC · JPL
430081	2013 SD_{52}	—	April 28, 2004	Kitt Peak	Spacewatch	·	1.5 km	MPC · JPL
430082	2013 SO_{55}	—	November 19, 2009	Kitt Peak	Spacewatch	·	1.5 km	MPC · JPL
430083	2013 SY_{55}	—	October 31, 2005	Mount Lemmon	Mount Lemmon Survey	·	1.7 km	MPC · JPL
430084	2013 SB_{57}	—	October 27, 2008	Mount Lemmon	Mount Lemmon Survey	·	2.3 km	MPC · JPL
430085	2013 SD_{57}	—	October 11, 2007	Mount Lemmon	Mount Lemmon Survey	·	3.2 km	MPC · JPL
430086	2013 SC_{58}	—	February 15, 2010	Kitt Peak	Spacewatch	·	2.9 km	MPC · JPL
430087	2013 SM_{58}	—	October 19, 2003	Kitt Peak	Spacewatch	·	2.3 km	MPC · JPL
430088	2013 SP_{59}	—	September 29, 2008	Catalina	CSS	AGN	1.3 km	MPC · JPL
430089	2013 SC_{61}	—	September 13, 2013	Catalina	CSS	·	2.2 km	MPC · JPL
430090	2013 SD_{61}	—	March 11, 2005	Catalina	CSS	(21885)	4.0 km	MPC · JPL
430091	2013 SV_{61}	—	October 4, 2006	Mount Lemmon	Mount Lemmon Survey	·	860 m	MPC · JPL
430092	2013 SK_{62}	—	April 22, 2009	Mount Lemmon	Mount Lemmon Survey	·	670 m	MPC · JPL
430093	2013 SG_{63}	—	October 17, 2010	Mount Lemmon	Mount Lemmon Survey	·	700 m	MPC · JPL
430094	2013 SL_{64}	—	March 30, 2011	Mount Lemmon	Mount Lemmon Survey	·	1.6 km	MPC · JPL
430095	2013 ST_{65}	—	February 16, 2007	Catalina	CSS	·	1.9 km	MPC · JPL
430096	2013 SX_{66}	—	October 12, 2004	Socorro	LINEAR	·	2.6 km	MPC · JPL
430097	2013 SU_{71}	—	May 16, 2005	Mount Lemmon	Mount Lemmon Survey	·	1.2 km	MPC · JPL
430098	2013 SX_{72}	—	February 13, 2004	Kitt Peak	Spacewatch	·	2.4 km	MPC · JPL
430099	2013 SF_{74}	—	March 1, 2005	Kitt Peak	Spacewatch	·	790 m	MPC · JPL
430100	2013 SV_{74}	—	December 21, 2003	Socorro	LINEAR	·	690 m	MPC · JPL

== 430101–430200 ==
back to top

Designation			Discovery			Properties		Ref
Permanent	Provisional	Named after	Date	Site	Discoverer(s)	Category	Diam.	Ref
430101	2013 SO_{75}	—	November 27, 2009	Mount Lemmon	Mount Lemmon Survey	·	2.1 km	MPC · JPL
430102	2013 SZ_{81}	—	December 19, 2004	Mount Lemmon	Mount Lemmon Survey	·	860 m	MPC · JPL
430103	2013 SG_{84}	—	January 9, 2006	Kitt Peak	Spacewatch	·	1.7 km	MPC · JPL
430104	2013 SH_{84}	—	September 27, 2006	Mount Lemmon	Mount Lemmon Survey	V	810 m	MPC · JPL
430105	2013 SZ_{86}	—	October 6, 1999	Kitt Peak	Spacewatch	·	2.1 km	MPC · JPL
430106	2013 TV	—	December 30, 2007	Kitt Peak	Spacewatch	·	770 m	MPC · JPL
430107	2013 TP_{1}	—	November 12, 2005	Kitt Peak	Spacewatch	·	2.0 km	MPC · JPL
430108	2013 TM_{2}	—	September 30, 2013	Mount Lemmon	Mount Lemmon Survey	·	3.0 km	MPC · JPL
430109	2013 TO_{2}	—	May 28, 2008	Kitt Peak	Spacewatch	·	1.2 km	MPC · JPL
430110	2013 TX_{3}	—	September 27, 2000	Socorro	LINEAR	·	1.6 km	MPC · JPL
430111	2013 TH_{8}	—	January 23, 2006	Kitt Peak	Spacewatch	AGN	1.3 km	MPC · JPL
430112	2013 TL_{8}	—	November 24, 2006	Mount Lemmon	Mount Lemmon Survey	NYS	1.6 km	MPC · JPL
430113	2013 TJ_{9}	—	March 6, 2011	Mount Lemmon	Mount Lemmon Survey	MAR	1.2 km	MPC · JPL
430114	2013 TB_{10}	—	January 4, 2010	Kitt Peak	Spacewatch	·	2.3 km	MPC · JPL
430115	2013 TG_{10}	—	February 12, 2004	Kitt Peak	Spacewatch	V	670 m	MPC · JPL
430116	2013 TO_{12}	—	March 20, 2010	Mount Lemmon	Mount Lemmon Survey	·	2.7 km	MPC · JPL
430117	2013 TA_{13}	—	October 10, 2004	Kitt Peak	Spacewatch	·	2.1 km	MPC · JPL
430118	2013 TJ_{14}	—	July 5, 2005	Kitt Peak	Spacewatch	·	940 m	MPC · JPL
430119	2013 TK_{14}	—	July 21, 2006	Mount Lemmon	Mount Lemmon Survey	·	740 m	MPC · JPL
430120	2013 TF_{25}	—	February 15, 2010	Catalina	CSS	DOR	1.7 km	MPC · JPL
430121	2013 TK_{25}	—	October 26, 2009	Kitt Peak	Spacewatch	·	1.5 km	MPC · JPL
430122	2013 TZ_{27}	—	October 23, 2009	Mount Lemmon	Mount Lemmon Survey	·	1.2 km	MPC · JPL
430123	2013 TN_{28}	—	August 18, 2009	Kitt Peak	Spacewatch	·	1.4 km	MPC · JPL
430124	2013 TU_{29}	—	January 17, 2007	Kitt Peak	Spacewatch	MAS	820 m	MPC · JPL
430125	2013 TL_{31}	—	November 20, 2003	Socorro	LINEAR	·	800 m	MPC · JPL
430126	2013 TV_{31}	—	September 9, 2008	Mount Lemmon	Mount Lemmon Survey	·	3.0 km	MPC · JPL
430127	2013 TJ_{32}	—	February 15, 2010	Kitt Peak	Spacewatch	·	3.1 km	MPC · JPL
430128	2013 TH_{34}	—	November 20, 2004	Kitt Peak	Spacewatch	AGN	1.2 km	MPC · JPL
430129	2013 TA_{35}	—	October 5, 2004	Kitt Peak	Spacewatch	·	1.9 km	MPC · JPL
430130	2013 TV_{35}	—	December 1, 2003	Kitt Peak	Spacewatch	·	840 m	MPC · JPL
430131	2013 TD_{36}	—	February 7, 2006	Mount Lemmon	Mount Lemmon Survey	·	1.9 km	MPC · JPL
430132	2013 TA_{37}	—	November 4, 2004	Catalina	CSS	·	1.8 km	MPC · JPL
430133	2013 TV_{38}	—	February 26, 2012	Mount Lemmon	Mount Lemmon Survey	·	670 m	MPC · JPL
430134	2013 TW_{38}	—	October 26, 2009	Mount Lemmon	Mount Lemmon Survey	·	1.6 km	MPC · JPL
430135	2013 TT_{39}	—	September 30, 2006	Mount Lemmon	Mount Lemmon Survey	·	790 m	MPC · JPL
430136	2013 TB_{40}	—	October 7, 2004	Kitt Peak	Spacewatch	·	1.9 km	MPC · JPL
430137	2013 TZ_{42}	—	October 3, 2008	Mount Lemmon	Mount Lemmon Survey	·	2.7 km	MPC · JPL
430138	2013 TA_{43}	—	November 4, 2005	Mount Lemmon	Mount Lemmon Survey	(5)	1.2 km	MPC · JPL
430139	2013 TZ_{43}	—	April 2, 2006	Catalina	CSS	EUN	1.2 km	MPC · JPL
430140	2013 TJ_{44}	—	February 13, 2004	Kitt Peak	Spacewatch	·	2.4 km	MPC · JPL
430141	2013 TS_{44}	—	September 19, 2008	Kitt Peak	Spacewatch	·	1.6 km	MPC · JPL
430142	2013 TG_{46}	—	August 15, 2009	Kitt Peak	Spacewatch	·	1.2 km	MPC · JPL
430143	2013 TK_{46}	—	November 19, 2009	Kitt Peak	Spacewatch	·	1.4 km	MPC · JPL
430144	2013 TQ_{46}	—	November 4, 2004	Kitt Peak	Spacewatch	GEF	1.2 km	MPC · JPL
430145	2013 TY_{46}	—	October 1, 2002	Anderson Mesa	LONEOS	NYS	1.1 km	MPC · JPL
430146	2013 TT_{48}	—	September 13, 2013	Mount Lemmon	Mount Lemmon Survey	KOR	1.3 km	MPC · JPL
430147	2013 TN_{49}	—	January 23, 2006	Kitt Peak	Spacewatch	·	1.6 km	MPC · JPL
430148	2013 TH_{50}	—	September 10, 2007	Mount Lemmon	Mount Lemmon Survey	THM	2.2 km	MPC · JPL
430149	2013 TP_{50}	—	November 12, 1999	Socorro	LINEAR	·	2.1 km	MPC · JPL
430150	2013 TR_{50}	—	November 18, 2008	Kitt Peak	Spacewatch	·	1.6 km	MPC · JPL
430151	2013 TJ_{51}	—	November 21, 2009	Mount Lemmon	Mount Lemmon Survey	·	1.8 km	MPC · JPL
430152	2013 TR_{53}	—	January 31, 2006	Kitt Peak	Spacewatch	·	1.7 km	MPC · JPL
430153	2013 TS_{60}	—	January 27, 2007	Mount Lemmon	Mount Lemmon Survey	·	1.4 km	MPC · JPL
430154	2013 TA_{65}	—	October 5, 2004	Kitt Peak	Spacewatch	·	2.5 km	MPC · JPL
430155	2013 TP_{69}	—	July 27, 2009	Kitt Peak	Spacewatch	·	1.3 km	MPC · JPL
430156	2013 TA_{70}	—	March 14, 2010	WISE	WISE	·	1.5 km	MPC · JPL
430157	2013 TS_{71}	—	October 15, 1998	Kitt Peak	Spacewatch	MAS	670 m	MPC · JPL
430158	2013 TQ_{72}	—	February 16, 2010	Kitt Peak	Spacewatch	THM	2.3 km	MPC · JPL
430159	2013 TO_{73}	—	May 20, 2012	Mount Lemmon	Mount Lemmon Survey	EUN	1.3 km	MPC · JPL
430160	2013 TQ_{74}	—	August 25, 2004	Kitt Peak	Spacewatch	EUN	1.1 km	MPC · JPL
430161	2013 TV_{74}	—	November 12, 2005	Kitt Peak	Spacewatch	·	970 m	MPC · JPL
430162	2013 TP_{75}	—	November 11, 2004	Kitt Peak	Spacewatch	·	2.9 km	MPC · JPL
430163	2013 TR_{76}	—	October 15, 2007	Mount Lemmon	Mount Lemmon Survey	·	2.8 km	MPC · JPL
430164	2013 TT_{79}	—	August 26, 2000	Socorro	LINEAR	·	1.8 km	MPC · JPL
430165	2013 TQ_{80}	—	August 22, 2004	Kitt Peak	Spacewatch	·	1.3 km	MPC · JPL
430166	2013 TZ_{82}	—	October 22, 2008	Kitt Peak	Spacewatch	·	1.7 km	MPC · JPL
430167	2013 TA_{83}	—	February 13, 2007	Mount Lemmon	Mount Lemmon Survey	·	1.4 km	MPC · JPL
430168	2013 TV_{83}	—	October 8, 2004	Kitt Peak	Spacewatch	·	1.7 km	MPC · JPL
430169	2013 TO_{87}	—	September 7, 2004	Kitt Peak	Spacewatch	·	1.5 km	MPC · JPL
430170	2013 TB_{89}	—	October 18, 2003	Kitt Peak	Spacewatch	·	2.1 km	MPC · JPL
430171	2013 TN_{89}	—	November 21, 2009	Kitt Peak	Spacewatch	·	1.3 km	MPC · JPL
430172	2013 TT_{91}	—	October 27, 2008	Kitt Peak	Spacewatch	·	1.4 km	MPC · JPL
430173	2013 TL_{94}	—	September 17, 2006	Catalina	CSS	·	760 m	MPC · JPL
430174	2013 TL_{95}	—	October 12, 2007	Mount Lemmon	Mount Lemmon Survey	LIX	3.1 km	MPC · JPL
430175	2013 TZ_{96}	—	August 9, 2013	Kitt Peak	Spacewatch	·	1.3 km	MPC · JPL
430176	2013 TE_{98}	—	March 28, 2008	Mount Lemmon	Mount Lemmon Survey	·	1.1 km	MPC · JPL
430177	2013 TV_{98}	—	September 7, 2008	Mount Lemmon	Mount Lemmon Survey	·	1.8 km	MPC · JPL
430178	2013 TW_{98}	—	December 25, 2005	Kitt Peak	Spacewatch	·	1.6 km	MPC · JPL
430179	2013 TA_{101}	—	September 7, 2004	Kitt Peak	Spacewatch	·	1.3 km	MPC · JPL
430180	2013 TA_{103}	—	October 8, 2004	Kitt Peak	Spacewatch	·	1.4 km	MPC · JPL
430181	2013 TJ_{105}	—	February 7, 2008	Kitt Peak	Spacewatch	·	1.2 km	MPC · JPL
430182	2013 TC_{106}	—	September 21, 2009	Mount Lemmon	Mount Lemmon Survey	·	1.1 km	MPC · JPL
430183	2013 TD_{107}	—	April 18, 2007	Kitt Peak	Spacewatch	·	1.8 km	MPC · JPL
430184	2013 TG_{109}	—	November 14, 2010	Kitt Peak	Spacewatch	·	660 m	MPC · JPL
430185	2013 TS_{109}	—	October 8, 2004	Kitt Peak	Spacewatch	·	1.9 km	MPC · JPL
430186	2013 TD_{110}	—	September 14, 1999	Kitt Peak	Spacewatch	·	1.9 km	MPC · JPL
430187	2013 TN_{110}	—	October 10, 1996	Kitt Peak	Spacewatch	(5)	1.2 km	MPC · JPL
430188	2013 TU_{110}	—	November 6, 2005	Kitt Peak	Spacewatch	·	1.8 km	MPC · JPL
430189	2013 TL_{115}	—	March 15, 2008	Kitt Peak	Spacewatch	·	1.1 km	MPC · JPL
430190	2013 TW_{121}	—	October 15, 2004	Mount Lemmon	Mount Lemmon Survey	MRX	960 m	MPC · JPL
430191	2013 TB_{122}	—	April 5, 2011	Kitt Peak	Spacewatch	EOS	2.3 km	MPC · JPL
430192	2013 TJ_{123}	—	November 14, 2007	Mount Lemmon	Mount Lemmon Survey	·	710 m	MPC · JPL
430193	2013 TV_{127}	—	March 16, 2010	Kitt Peak	Spacewatch	·	2.4 km	MPC · JPL
430194	2013 TH_{128}	—	October 5, 2004	Kitt Peak	Spacewatch	·	1.3 km	MPC · JPL
430195	2013 TZ_{129}	—	October 25, 2008	Kitt Peak	Spacewatch	·	2.8 km	MPC · JPL
430196	2013 TT_{130}	—	November 16, 2009	Kitt Peak	Spacewatch	·	2.1 km	MPC · JPL
430197	2013 TC_{131}	—	October 13, 2007	Mount Lemmon	Mount Lemmon Survey	T_{j} (2.99)	2.8 km	MPC · JPL
430198	2013 TU_{131}	—	March 29, 2011	Mount Lemmon	Mount Lemmon Survey	·	2.2 km	MPC · JPL
430199	2013 TA_{132}	—	January 27, 2007	Kitt Peak	Spacewatch	·	1.3 km	MPC · JPL
430200	2013 TL_{136}	—	July 28, 2009	Kitt Peak	Spacewatch	·	1.4 km	MPC · JPL

== 430201–430300 ==
back to top

Designation			Discovery			Properties		Ref
Permanent	Provisional	Named after	Date	Site	Discoverer(s)	Category	Diam.	Ref
430201	2013 TX_{137}	—	December 13, 2004	Kitt Peak	Spacewatch	MRX	1.3 km	MPC · JPL
430202	2013 TH_{139}	—	March 11, 2008	Kitt Peak	Spacewatch	·	1.2 km	MPC · JPL
430203	2013 TL_{139}	—	May 18, 2012	Mount Lemmon	Mount Lemmon Survey	(5)	1.7 km	MPC · JPL
430204	2013 TU_{141}	—	October 1, 2005	Mount Lemmon	Mount Lemmon Survey	·	860 m	MPC · JPL
430205	2013 TW_{142}	—	October 6, 2005	Mount Lemmon	Mount Lemmon Survey	·	1.2 km	MPC · JPL
430206	2013 TX_{142}	—	October 9, 2004	Kitt Peak	Spacewatch	·	2.3 km	MPC · JPL
430207	2013 TB_{143}	—	April 11, 2005	Mount Lemmon	Mount Lemmon Survey	URS	3.0 km	MPC · JPL
430208	2013 TJ_{143}	—	November 23, 2006	Mount Lemmon	Mount Lemmon Survey	·	1.3 km	MPC · JPL
430209	2013 TZ_{143}	—	September 15, 1998	Kitt Peak	Spacewatch	·	1.2 km	MPC · JPL
430210	2013 TM_{145}	—	January 23, 2006	Kitt Peak	Spacewatch	·	1.7 km	MPC · JPL
430211	2013 UX_{4}	—	January 10, 2006	Mount Lemmon	Mount Lemmon Survey	MIS	2.3 km	MPC · JPL
430212	2013 UN_{6}	—	November 19, 2008	Mount Lemmon	Mount Lemmon Survey	·	3.5 km	MPC · JPL
430213	2013 UB_{12}	—	April 5, 2003	Kitt Peak	Spacewatch	·	2.1 km	MPC · JPL
430214	2013 UG_{12}	—	November 23, 2009	Catalina	CSS	·	1.7 km	MPC · JPL
430215	2013 UF_{14}	—	November 6, 2008	Catalina	CSS	·	2.6 km	MPC · JPL
430216	2013 VU	—	December 1, 2006	Mount Lemmon	Mount Lemmon Survey	·	1.1 km	MPC · JPL
430217	2013 VS_{2}	—	January 2, 1997	Kitt Peak	Spacewatch	·	1.6 km	MPC · JPL
430218	2013 VV_{3}	—	January 18, 2009	Kitt Peak	Spacewatch	LIX	3.7 km	MPC · JPL
430219	2013 VZ_{5}	—	September 19, 2009	Mount Lemmon	Mount Lemmon Survey	·	1.3 km	MPC · JPL
430220	2013 VA_{9}	—	November 22, 2005	Catalina	CSS	H	580 m	MPC · JPL
430221	2013 VH_{10}	—	October 25, 2005	Catalina	CSS	·	1.3 km	MPC · JPL
430222	2013 VC_{11}	—	January 5, 2010	Kitt Peak	Spacewatch	·	2.6 km	MPC · JPL
430223	2013 VF_{14}	—	December 5, 2002	Socorro	LINEAR	·	3.1 km	MPC · JPL
430224	2013 VL_{14}	—	September 12, 2007	Catalina	CSS	·	3.1 km	MPC · JPL
430225	2013 VW_{14}	—	February 8, 2011	Mount Lemmon	Mount Lemmon Survey	·	1 km	MPC · JPL
430226	2013 VE_{15}	—	October 1, 2008	Catalina	CSS	·	2.5 km	MPC · JPL
430227	2013 VG_{18}	—	October 11, 2007	Mount Lemmon	Mount Lemmon Survey	·	2.5 km	MPC · JPL
430228	2013 VO_{18}	—	September 17, 2004	Anderson Mesa	LONEOS	EUN	1.4 km	MPC · JPL
430229	2013 VS_{18}	—	November 17, 2009	Mount Lemmon	Mount Lemmon Survey	·	2.4 km	MPC · JPL
430230	2013 VL_{19}	—	December 5, 2005	Kitt Peak	Spacewatch	(5)	1.5 km	MPC · JPL
430231	2013 VL_{20}	—	September 11, 2007	Mount Lemmon	Mount Lemmon Survey	·	3.3 km	MPC · JPL
430232	2013 VV_{21}	—	July 31, 2009	Kitt Peak	Spacewatch	V	620 m	MPC · JPL
430233	2013 VW_{21}	—	October 10, 2004	Kitt Peak	Spacewatch	·	2.1 km	MPC · JPL
430234	2013 VY_{21}	—	April 18, 2007	Kitt Peak	Spacewatch	·	2.1 km	MPC · JPL
430235	2013 VZ_{21}	—	August 31, 2000	Socorro	LINEAR	MAR	1.5 km	MPC · JPL
430236	2013 WQ_{2}	—	October 7, 2004	Socorro	LINEAR	·	2.2 km	MPC · JPL
430237	2013 WS_{3}	—	October 11, 2007	Catalina	CSS	·	2.3 km	MPC · JPL
430238	2013 WQ_{5}	—	November 23, 2009	Catalina	CSS	·	1.7 km	MPC · JPL
430239	2013 WA_{6}	—	December 21, 2008	Catalina	CSS	·	2.7 km	MPC · JPL
430240	2013 WT_{6}	—	October 4, 2002	Campo Imperatore	CINEOS	EOS	2.1 km	MPC · JPL
430241	2013 WN_{9}	—	September 12, 2007	Mount Lemmon	Mount Lemmon Survey	·	2.2 km	MPC · JPL
430242	2013 WP_{9}	—	September 17, 2009	Kitt Peak	Spacewatch	·	1.3 km	MPC · JPL
430243	2013 WG_{11}	—	September 10, 2007	Kitt Peak	Spacewatch	·	2.9 km	MPC · JPL
430244	2013 WQ_{11}	—	October 9, 2007	Mount Lemmon	Mount Lemmon Survey	THM	1.8 km	MPC · JPL
430245	2013 WY_{11}	—	May 16, 2007	Mount Lemmon	Mount Lemmon Survey	MAR	1.3 km	MPC · JPL
430246	2013 WZ_{11}	—	June 10, 2007	Kitt Peak	Spacewatch	·	2.7 km	MPC · JPL
430247	2013 WG_{13}	—	March 9, 2005	Mount Lemmon	Mount Lemmon Survey	·	1.8 km	MPC · JPL
430248	2013 WT_{14}	—	April 2, 2006	Kitt Peak	Spacewatch	HOF	2.4 km	MPC · JPL
430249	2013 WQ_{15}	—	August 9, 2004	Socorro	LINEAR	(5)	1.4 km	MPC · JPL
430250	2013 WR_{19}	—	April 26, 2011	Mount Lemmon	Mount Lemmon Survey	·	1.7 km	MPC · JPL
430251	2013 WS_{19}	—	October 10, 1999	Socorro	LINEAR	·	2.4 km	MPC · JPL
430252	2013 WL_{20}	—	March 26, 2006	Mount Lemmon	Mount Lemmon Survey	·	1.7 km	MPC · JPL
430253	2013 WD_{22}	—	May 12, 2010	WISE	WISE	·	3.8 km	MPC · JPL
430254	2013 WO_{26}	—	September 4, 2007	Catalina	CSS	EOS	2.5 km	MPC · JPL
430255	2013 WA_{29}	—	October 24, 2008	Kitt Peak	Spacewatch	·	2.1 km	MPC · JPL
430256	2013 WV_{30}	—	November 22, 2008	Kitt Peak	Spacewatch	·	2.4 km	MPC · JPL
430257	2013 WV_{31}	—	November 2, 2013	Kitt Peak	Spacewatch	·	3.3 km	MPC · JPL
430258	2013 WW_{31}	—	September 29, 2003	Kitt Peak	Spacewatch	KOR	1.3 km	MPC · JPL
430259	2013 WY_{32}	—	October 2, 2008	Kitt Peak	Spacewatch	·	1.5 km	MPC · JPL
430260	2013 WN_{35}	—	March 9, 2005	Mount Lemmon	Mount Lemmon Survey	·	760 m	MPC · JPL
430261	2013 WK_{36}	—	December 3, 2008	Mount Lemmon	Mount Lemmon Survey	·	3.9 km	MPC · JPL
430262	2013 WA_{38}	—	April 30, 2011	Mount Lemmon	Mount Lemmon Survey	·	2.4 km	MPC · JPL
430263	2013 WE_{40}	—	October 4, 2007	Kitt Peak	Spacewatch	·	2.6 km	MPC · JPL
430264	2013 WN_{40}	—	November 3, 2008	Mount Lemmon	Mount Lemmon Survey	·	2.6 km	MPC · JPL
430265	2013 WA_{41}	—	September 13, 2007	Mount Lemmon	Mount Lemmon Survey	·	1.9 km	MPC · JPL
430266	2013 WQ_{41}	—	January 22, 1998	Kitt Peak	Spacewatch	·	1.3 km	MPC · JPL
430267	2013 WM_{42}	—	December 8, 1999	Kitt Peak	Spacewatch	·	2.2 km	MPC · JPL
430268	2013 WY_{42}	—	May 22, 2011	Mount Lemmon	Mount Lemmon Survey	·	2.0 km	MPC · JPL
430269	2013 WQ_{46}	—	March 26, 2010	WISE	WISE	·	2.9 km	MPC · JPL
430270	2013 WQ_{47}	—	April 2, 2006	Kitt Peak	Spacewatch	·	2.2 km	MPC · JPL
430271	2013 WJ_{48}	—	May 23, 2010	WISE	WISE	·	4.1 km	MPC · JPL
430272	2013 WS_{48}	—	November 19, 2003	Socorro	LINEAR	·	2.8 km	MPC · JPL
430273	2013 WJ_{50}	—	January 30, 2004	Kitt Peak	Spacewatch	·	3.0 km	MPC · JPL
430274	2013 WF_{53}	—	October 25, 2008	Catalina	CSS	·	2.7 km	MPC · JPL
430275	2013 WC_{54}	—	November 10, 1993	Kitt Peak	Spacewatch	EUN	1.4 km	MPC · JPL
430276	2013 WD_{54}	—	March 27, 2004	Kitt Peak	Spacewatch	LIX	2.9 km	MPC · JPL
430277	2013 WG_{55}	—	September 20, 2007	Catalina	CSS	·	3.3 km	MPC · JPL
430278	2013 WK_{55}	—	December 30, 2005	Catalina	CSS	EUN	1.4 km	MPC · JPL
430279	2013 WW_{55}	—	December 10, 2009	Mount Lemmon	Mount Lemmon Survey	·	2.8 km	MPC · JPL
430280	2013 WL_{56}	—	October 19, 2007	Catalina	CSS	·	3.5 km	MPC · JPL
430281	2013 WR_{56}	—	August 22, 2004	Kitt Peak	Spacewatch	(5)	1.3 km	MPC · JPL
430282	2013 WT_{57}	—	May 21, 2011	Mount Lemmon	Mount Lemmon Survey	EOS	2.2 km	MPC · JPL
430283	2013 WD_{61}	—	November 9, 2009	Catalina	CSS	·	1.4 km	MPC · JPL
430284	2013 WM_{62}	—	November 27, 2009	Mount Lemmon	Mount Lemmon Survey	·	1.8 km	MPC · JPL
430285	2013 WV_{64}	—	February 18, 2010	Kitt Peak	Spacewatch	·	3.6 km	MPC · JPL
430286	2013 WX_{64}	—	November 23, 2009	Catalina	CSS	·	1.8 km	MPC · JPL
430287	2013 WM_{65}	—	March 25, 2007	Mount Lemmon	Mount Lemmon Survey	·	1.5 km	MPC · JPL
430288	2013 WH_{66}	—	November 20, 2009	Kitt Peak	Spacewatch	·	1.3 km	MPC · JPL
430289	2013 WG_{68}	—	November 21, 2009	Catalina	CSS	·	1.7 km	MPC · JPL
430290	2013 WO_{69}	—	October 27, 2008	Kitt Peak	Spacewatch	·	1.6 km	MPC · JPL
430291	2013 WH_{71}	—	October 9, 2004	Kitt Peak	Spacewatch	·	1.6 km	MPC · JPL
430292	2013 WU_{73}	—	September 24, 2000	Socorro	LINEAR	(5)	1.5 km	MPC · JPL
430293	2013 WG_{75}	—	October 9, 2008	Mount Lemmon	Mount Lemmon Survey	·	2.0 km	MPC · JPL
430294	2013 WA_{76}	—	March 25, 2010	Mount Lemmon	Mount Lemmon Survey	·	3.3 km	MPC · JPL
430295	2013 WF_{81}	—	September 28, 2008	Catalina	CSS	·	2.0 km	MPC · JPL
430296	2013 WB_{82}	—	December 5, 2008	Kitt Peak	Spacewatch	·	1.8 km	MPC · JPL
430297	2013 WG_{84}	—	May 31, 2008	Mount Lemmon	Mount Lemmon Survey	·	1.3 km	MPC · JPL
430298	2013 WX_{84}	—	September 12, 2007	Catalina	CSS	·	3.3 km	MPC · JPL
430299	2013 WC_{97}	—	December 27, 2005	Kitt Peak	Spacewatch	(5)	1.4 km	MPC · JPL
430300	2013 WL_{97}	—	January 14, 2010	WISE	WISE	·	4.7 km	MPC · JPL

== 430301–430400 ==
back to top

Designation			Discovery			Properties		Ref
Permanent	Provisional	Named after	Date	Site	Discoverer(s)	Category	Diam.	Ref
430301	2013 WR_{98}	—	October 10, 2008	Mount Lemmon	Mount Lemmon Survey	·	1.8 km	MPC · JPL
430302	2013 WQ_{99}	—	September 24, 2008	Mount Lemmon	Mount Lemmon Survey	·	2.1 km	MPC · JPL
430303	2013 WC_{103}	—	March 26, 2011	Kitt Peak	Spacewatch	EUN	1.4 km	MPC · JPL
430304	2013 WO_{104}	—	November 4, 2004	Kitt Peak	Spacewatch	·	1.7 km	MPC · JPL
430305	2013 WX_{106}	—	December 28, 2005	Kitt Peak	Spacewatch	·	1.5 km	MPC · JPL
430306	2013 WS_{107}	—	May 29, 2012	Mount Lemmon	Mount Lemmon Survey	·	3.8 km	MPC · JPL
430307	2013 XZ	—	December 30, 2005	Kitt Peak	Spacewatch	·	1.2 km	MPC · JPL
430308	2013 XU_{2}	—	January 29, 2009	Mount Lemmon	Mount Lemmon Survey	·	4.3 km	MPC · JPL
430309	2013 XG_{3}	—	November 2, 2013	Mount Lemmon	Mount Lemmon Survey	CYB	4.1 km	MPC · JPL
430310	2013 XS_{10}	—	June 21, 2007	Mount Lemmon	Mount Lemmon Survey	AGN	1.3 km	MPC · JPL
430311	2013 XU_{10}	—	September 10, 2007	Kitt Peak	Spacewatch	·	2.8 km	MPC · JPL
430312	2013 XS_{11}	—	November 2, 2010	Mount Lemmon	Mount Lemmon Survey	L4	8.2 km	MPC · JPL
430313	2013 XU_{12}	—	October 4, 2006	Mount Lemmon	Mount Lemmon Survey	V	570 m	MPC · JPL
430314	2013 XG_{16}	—	September 24, 1960	Palomar	C. J. van Houten, I. van Houten-Groeneveld, T. Gehrels	·	1.4 km	MPC · JPL
430315	2013 XM_{19}	—	November 20, 2008	Mount Lemmon	Mount Lemmon Survey	T_{j} (2.96)	4.1 km	MPC · JPL
430316	2013 YD_{7}	—	July 18, 2007	Mount Lemmon	Mount Lemmon Survey	KOR	1.4 km	MPC · JPL
430317	2013 YV_{7}	—	October 1, 2008	Mount Lemmon	Mount Lemmon Survey	·	2.1 km	MPC · JPL
430318	2013 YT_{11}	—	February 13, 2010	WISE	WISE	·	3.3 km	MPC · JPL
430319	2013 YX_{12}	—	June 16, 2005	Mount Lemmon	Mount Lemmon Survey	·	3.8 km	MPC · JPL
430320	2013 YD_{13}	—	December 18, 2003	Socorro	LINEAR	·	2.4 km	MPC · JPL
430321	2013 YJ_{18}	—	December 11, 2004	Kitt Peak	Spacewatch	·	1.8 km	MPC · JPL
430322	2013 YB_{23}	—	May 12, 2011	Mount Lemmon	Mount Lemmon Survey	·	2.7 km	MPC · JPL
430323	2013 YY_{24}	—	September 10, 2007	Kitt Peak	Spacewatch	·	2.5 km	MPC · JPL
430324	2013 YF_{25}	—	June 14, 2005	Mount Lemmon	Mount Lemmon Survey	·	5.0 km	MPC · JPL
430325	2013 YD_{26}	—	November 8, 2013	Mount Lemmon	Mount Lemmon Survey	EOS	2.3 km	MPC · JPL
430326	2013 YE_{33}	—	April 30, 2006	Kitt Peak	Spacewatch	KOR	1.6 km	MPC · JPL
430327	2013 YJ_{33}	—	May 27, 2003	Kitt Peak	Spacewatch	EUN	1.4 km	MPC · JPL
430328	2013 YH_{35}	—	April 22, 2007	Mount Lemmon	Mount Lemmon Survey	·	1.7 km	MPC · JPL
430329	2013 YC_{36}	—	August 20, 2000	Anderson Mesa	LONEOS	·	2.0 km	MPC · JPL
430330	2013 YH_{37}	—	May 14, 2005	Mount Lemmon	Mount Lemmon Survey	·	2.7 km	MPC · JPL
430331	2013 YR_{38}	—	January 13, 2005	Kitt Peak	Spacewatch	·	3.2 km	MPC · JPL
430332	2013 YZ_{38}	—	March 24, 2003	Kitt Peak	Spacewatch	·	1.2 km	MPC · JPL
430333	2013 YK_{40}	—	November 5, 2007	Mount Lemmon	Mount Lemmon Survey	·	3.6 km	MPC · JPL
430334	2013 YX_{41}	—	November 22, 2006	Mount Lemmon	Mount Lemmon Survey	·	1.2 km	MPC · JPL
430335	2013 YM_{47}	—	November 19, 2008	Mount Lemmon	Mount Lemmon Survey	·	2.2 km	MPC · JPL
430336	2013 YR_{51}	—	February 2, 2009	Mount Lemmon	Mount Lemmon Survey	·	2.8 km	MPC · JPL
430337	2013 YM_{52}	—	January 15, 2004	Kitt Peak	Spacewatch	EOS	1.5 km	MPC · JPL
430338	2013 YP_{53}	—	December 4, 2005	Kitt Peak	Spacewatch	(5)	1.7 km	MPC · JPL
430339	2013 YG_{57}	—	October 29, 2008	Kitt Peak	Spacewatch	·	2.3 km	MPC · JPL
430340	2013 YV_{65}	—	April 6, 2010	Catalina	CSS	·	3.3 km	MPC · JPL
430341	2013 YZ_{65}	—	January 20, 2001	Socorro	LINEAR	·	2.0 km	MPC · JPL
430342	2013 YQ_{70}	—	August 23, 2008	Siding Spring	SSS	·	2.3 km	MPC · JPL
430343	2013 YT_{70}	—	December 5, 2002	Socorro	LINEAR	V	730 m	MPC · JPL
430344	2013 YD_{73}	—	January 20, 2009	Kitt Peak	Spacewatch	·	2.9 km	MPC · JPL
430345	2013 YG_{78}	—	December 13, 2007	Socorro	LINEAR	EOS	2.3 km	MPC · JPL
430346	2013 YO_{81}	—	January 23, 2006	Mount Lemmon	Mount Lemmon Survey	·	1.2 km	MPC · JPL
430347	2013 YK_{104}	—	December 9, 1996	Kitt Peak	Spacewatch	VER	2.8 km	MPC · JPL
430348	2013 YX_{106}	—	October 18, 2006	Kitt Peak	Spacewatch	·	3.2 km	MPC · JPL
430349	2013 YU_{108}	—	January 19, 2009	Mount Lemmon	Mount Lemmon Survey	·	2.5 km	MPC · JPL
430350	2013 YJ_{126}	—	September 24, 2008	Mount Lemmon	Mount Lemmon Survey	·	2.2 km	MPC · JPL
430351	2013 YV_{127}	—	October 20, 2003	Kitt Peak	Spacewatch	MRX	1.2 km	MPC · JPL
430352	2013 YU_{129}	—	February 25, 2011	Mount Lemmon	Mount Lemmon Survey	MAR	1.2 km	MPC · JPL
430353	2013 YA_{142}	—	September 22, 2006	Kitt Peak	Spacewatch	·	4.9 km	MPC · JPL
430354	2013 YH_{142}	—	September 28, 2006	Kitt Peak	Spacewatch	CYB	3.8 km	MPC · JPL
430355	2013 YX_{148}	—	December 28, 2005	Kitt Peak	Spacewatch	·	1.1 km	MPC · JPL
430356	2013 YB_{149}	—	September 20, 2003	Kitt Peak	Spacewatch	·	2.4 km	MPC · JPL
430357	2013 YO_{149}	—	November 10, 2004	Kitt Peak	Spacewatch	·	2.3 km	MPC · JPL
430358	2014 AD	—	March 29, 2011	Catalina	CSS	·	2.0 km	MPC · JPL
430359	2014 AY_{9}	—	February 21, 2007	Kitt Peak	Spacewatch	·	1.3 km	MPC · JPL
430360	2014 AG_{12}	—	January 15, 2009	Kitt Peak	Spacewatch	·	2.7 km	MPC · JPL
430361	2014 AW_{20}	—	February 17, 2010	Catalina	CSS	·	2.3 km	MPC · JPL
430362	2014 AU_{26}	—	December 10, 2004	Socorro	LINEAR	·	3.0 km	MPC · JPL
430363	2014 AT_{29}	—	February 4, 2009	Catalina	CSS	·	2.7 km	MPC · JPL
430364	2014 AA_{34}	—	January 10, 2008	Mount Lemmon	Mount Lemmon Survey	CYB	3.6 km	MPC · JPL
430365	2014 BY_{15}	—	February 3, 2009	Kitt Peak	Spacewatch	·	4.8 km	MPC · JPL
430366	2014 BR_{18}	—	August 21, 2006	Kitt Peak	Spacewatch	·	3.0 km	MPC · JPL
430367	2014 BW_{19}	—	September 14, 2007	Catalina	CSS	·	2.1 km	MPC · JPL
430368	2014 BD_{26}	—	March 8, 2009	Mount Lemmon	Mount Lemmon Survey	·	4.1 km	MPC · JPL
430369	2014 BU_{28}	—	March 17, 2004	Kitt Peak	Spacewatch	·	2.3 km	MPC · JPL
430370	2014 BJ_{33}	—	November 24, 2008	Mount Lemmon	Mount Lemmon Survey	·	3.4 km	MPC · JPL
430371	2014 BV_{46}	—	December 25, 2005	Kitt Peak	Spacewatch	·	1.2 km	MPC · JPL
430372	2014 BU_{50}	—	November 18, 2003	Kitt Peak	Spacewatch	·	2.5 km	MPC · JPL
430373	2014 BS_{54}	—	July 29, 2008	Kitt Peak	Spacewatch	L4	8.5 km	MPC · JPL
430374	2014 CU_{10}	—	December 17, 2007	Kitt Peak	Spacewatch	·	3.4 km	MPC · JPL
430375	2014 DS_{26}	—	January 7, 2002	Kitt Peak	Spacewatch	L4	7.5 km	MPC · JPL
430376	2014 DR_{51}	—	September 6, 2008	Mount Lemmon	Mount Lemmon Survey	L4	7.9 km	MPC · JPL
430377	2014 DW_{87}	—	September 25, 2006	Catalina	CSS	·	6.1 km	MPC · JPL
430378	2014 EG_{6}	—	August 29, 2005	Kitt Peak	Spacewatch	·	3.3 km	MPC · JPL
430379	2014 GG_{48}	—	September 5, 2007	Mount Lemmon	Mount Lemmon Survey	L4	9.4 km	MPC · JPL
430380	2014 SY_{142}	—	October 17, 2009	Catalina	CSS	H	660 m	MPC · JPL
430381	2014 SU_{211}	—	January 12, 1996	Kitt Peak	Spacewatch	·	3.0 km	MPC · JPL
430382	2014 TY_{84}	—	November 20, 2003	Socorro	LINEAR	·	4.7 km	MPC · JPL
430383	2014 US_{54}	—	December 11, 2006	Kitt Peak	Spacewatch	·	2.1 km	MPC · JPL
430384	2014 UO_{108}	—	December 5, 1997	Caussols	ODAS	·	1.7 km	MPC · JPL
430385	2014 VO_{11}	—	January 17, 2007	Kitt Peak	Spacewatch	EUN	1.2 km	MPC · JPL
430386	2014 VO_{23}	—	January 18, 2005	Kitt Peak	Spacewatch	·	3.2 km	MPC · JPL
430387	2014 WA_{18}	—	September 21, 2003	Anderson Mesa	LONEOS	·	1.4 km	MPC · JPL
430388	2014 WL_{73}	—	February 4, 2006	Kitt Peak	Spacewatch	·	890 m	MPC · JPL
430389	2014 WB_{397}	—	July 27, 2005	Siding Spring	SSS	MAR	1.5 km	MPC · JPL
430390	2014 WB_{423}	—	February 5, 2011	Mount Lemmon	Mount Lemmon Survey	·	2.3 km	MPC · JPL
430391	2014 WX_{478}	—	October 5, 2002	Kitt Peak	Spacewatch	·	2.3 km	MPC · JPL
430392	2014 XD_{14}	—	November 7, 2008	Mount Lemmon	Mount Lemmon Survey	VER	3.4 km	MPC · JPL
430393	2014 XD_{26}	—	August 27, 2006	Kitt Peak	Spacewatch	·	910 m	MPC · JPL
430394	2014 XQ_{30}	—	October 20, 1993	Kitt Peak	Spacewatch	BRG	1.4 km	MPC · JPL
430395	2014 YP_{3}	—	November 12, 2005	Kitt Peak	Spacewatch	·	1.3 km	MPC · JPL
430396	2014 YS_{3}	—	December 22, 2008	Catalina	CSS	EOS	2.7 km	MPC · JPL
430397	2014 YT_{6}	—	October 15, 2009	Mount Lemmon	Mount Lemmon Survey	·	3.2 km	MPC · JPL
430398	2014 YM_{14}	—	November 9, 2007	Kitt Peak	Spacewatch	·	660 m	MPC · JPL
430399	2014 YC_{22}	—	November 2, 1999	Kitt Peak	Spacewatch	HOF	2.9 km	MPC · JPL
430400	2014 YL_{22}	—	January 22, 2004	Socorro	LINEAR	·	1.1 km	MPC · JPL

== 430401–430500 ==
back to top

Designation			Discovery			Properties		Ref
Permanent	Provisional	Named after	Date	Site	Discoverer(s)	Category	Diam.	Ref
430401	2014 YS_{24}	—	November 19, 2008	Catalina	CSS	·	3.8 km	MPC · JPL
430402	2014 YS_{28}	—	November 1, 2010	Mount Lemmon	Mount Lemmon Survey	·	1.5 km	MPC · JPL
430403	2014 YH_{30}	—	December 18, 1998	Caussols	ODAS	·	4.7 km	MPC · JPL
430404	2015 AT_{3}	—	November 27, 2009	Mount Lemmon	Mount Lemmon Survey	·	5.3 km	MPC · JPL
430405	2015 BZ_{302}	—	March 8, 2005	Catalina	CSS	·	2.1 km	MPC · JPL
430406	1994 VZ_{4}	—	November 5, 1994	Kitt Peak	Spacewatch	·	2.0 km	MPC · JPL
430407	1995 FM_{10}	—	March 26, 1995	Kitt Peak	Spacewatch	EOS	2.1 km	MPC · JPL
430408	1995 MX_{6}	—	June 29, 1995	Kitt Peak	Spacewatch	·	840 m	MPC · JPL
430409	1995 SC_{86}	—	September 26, 1995	Kitt Peak	Spacewatch	·	3.1 km	MPC · JPL
430410	1995 TL_{7}	—	October 15, 1995	Kitt Peak	Spacewatch	·	2.2 km	MPC · JPL
430411	1995 UV_{74}	—	October 21, 1995	Kitt Peak	Spacewatch	·	1.0 km	MPC · JPL
430412	1995 WL_{40}	—	November 23, 1995	Kitt Peak	Spacewatch	·	2.5 km	MPC · JPL
430413	1996 EM_{5}	—	March 11, 1996	Kitt Peak	Spacewatch	·	880 m	MPC · JPL
430414	1996 TX_{15}	—	October 4, 1996	Kitt Peak	Spacewatch	·	3.3 km	MPC · JPL
430415	1996 TW_{19}	—	October 5, 1996	Kitt Peak	Spacewatch	·	4.7 km	MPC · JPL
430416	1997 EG_{4}	—	March 2, 1997	Kitt Peak	Spacewatch	·	1.5 km	MPC · JPL
430417	1997 TG_{12}	—	October 2, 1997	Kitt Peak	Spacewatch	·	1.5 km	MPC · JPL
430418	1997 YQ_{17}	—	December 31, 1997	Kitt Peak	Spacewatch	·	2.0 km	MPC · JPL
430419	1998 BN_{28}	—	January 24, 1998	Kitt Peak	Spacewatch	THM	2.1 km	MPC · JPL
430420	1998 SD_{48}	—	September 27, 1998	Kitt Peak	Spacewatch	·	1.8 km	MPC · JPL
430421	1998 TA_{3}	—	October 13, 1998	Xinglong	SCAP	H	550 m	MPC · JPL
430422	1999 RU_{144}	—	September 9, 1999	Socorro	LINEAR	·	4.2 km	MPC · JPL
430423	1999 TO_{34}	—	October 1, 1999	Catalina	CSS	·	2.5 km	MPC · JPL
430424	1999 TV_{44}	—	October 3, 1999	Kitt Peak	Spacewatch	·	720 m	MPC · JPL
430425	1999 TV_{74}	—	October 10, 1999	Kitt Peak	Spacewatch	·	720 m	MPC · JPL
430426	1999 TL_{78}	—	October 6, 1999	Socorro	LINEAR	·	760 m	MPC · JPL
430427	1999 TY_{127}	—	October 4, 1999	Socorro	LINEAR	·	1.0 km	MPC · JPL
430428	1999 TR_{130}	—	October 6, 1999	Socorro	LINEAR	·	1.9 km	MPC · JPL
430429	1999 TX_{311}	—	October 7, 1999	Kitt Peak	Spacewatch	EUN	1.6 km	MPC · JPL
430430	1999 UF_{38}	—	October 13, 1999	Socorro	LINEAR	H	520 m	MPC · JPL
430431	1999 UT_{40}	—	October 16, 1999	Kitt Peak	Spacewatch	·	870 m	MPC · JPL
430432	1999 VL_{116}	—	November 4, 1999	Kitt Peak	Spacewatch	·	1.7 km	MPC · JPL
430433	1999 VO_{117}	—	November 9, 1999	Kitt Peak	Spacewatch	·	2.1 km	MPC · JPL
430434	1999 VM_{212}	—	November 12, 1999	Socorro	LINEAR	·	1.6 km	MPC · JPL
430435	1999 XV_{239}	—	December 7, 1999	Socorro	LINEAR	DOR	3.0 km	MPC · JPL
430436	2000 EQ_{101}	—	March 14, 2000	Kitt Peak	Spacewatch	NYS	1.0 km	MPC · JPL
430437	2000 GP_{40}	—	April 5, 2000	Socorro	LINEAR	·	1.5 km	MPC · JPL
430438	2000 GH_{120}	—	April 5, 2000	Kitt Peak	Spacewatch	·	1.1 km	MPC · JPL
430439	2000 LF_{6}	—	June 3, 2000	Anderson Mesa	LONEOS	T_{j} (2.93) · AMO	390 m	MPC · JPL
430440	2000 OH	—	July 21, 2000	Socorro	LINEAR	APO +1km · PHA	1.0 km	MPC · JPL
430441	2000 PX_{18}	—	August 1, 2000	Socorro	LINEAR	·	2.0 km	MPC · JPL
430442	2000 PF_{23}	—	August 2, 2000	Socorro	LINEAR	·	1.5 km	MPC · JPL
430443	2000 PW_{28}	—	August 2, 2000	Socorro	LINEAR	·	2.3 km	MPC · JPL
430444	2000 QR_{64}	—	August 28, 2000	Socorro	LINEAR	·	1.8 km	MPC · JPL
430445	2000 QZ_{106}	—	August 29, 2000	Socorro	LINEAR	·	2.9 km	MPC · JPL
430446	2000 QV_{137}	—	August 31, 2000	Socorro	LINEAR	·	2.4 km	MPC · JPL
430447	2000 SF_{79}	—	September 24, 2000	Socorro	LINEAR	·	3.3 km	MPC · JPL
430448	2000 SE_{97}	—	September 23, 2000	Socorro	LINEAR	·	1.2 km	MPC · JPL
430449	2000 SB_{194}	—	September 24, 2000	Socorro	LINEAR	(5)	1.2 km	MPC · JPL
430450	2000 SN_{232}	—	September 28, 2000	Socorro	LINEAR	H	440 m	MPC · JPL
430451	2000 TH_{31}	—	October 4, 2000	Kitt Peak	Spacewatch	H	380 m	MPC · JPL
430452	2000 UX_{74}	—	October 31, 2000	Socorro	LINEAR	(5)	1.2 km	MPC · JPL
430453	2000 UP_{106}	—	October 30, 2000	Socorro	LINEAR	·	1.5 km	MPC · JPL
430454	2000 VD_{2}	—	November 1, 2000	Socorro	LINEAR	H	590 m	MPC · JPL
430455	2000 WX_{11}	—	November 20, 2000	Kitt Peak	Spacewatch	MAR	1.2 km	MPC · JPL
430456	2000 WQ_{63}	—	October 30, 2000	Kitt Peak	Spacewatch	·	1.7 km	MPC · JPL
430457	2000 WV_{63}	—	September 27, 2000	Kitt Peak	Spacewatch	·	1.9 km	MPC · JPL
430458	2000 YK_{5}	—	December 20, 2000	Socorro	LINEAR	H	780 m	MPC · JPL
430459	2001 DH_{96}	—	February 17, 2001	Socorro	LINEAR	·	2.1 km	MPC · JPL
430460	2001 EO_{15}	—	March 15, 2001	Prescott	P. G. Comba	·	3.3 km	MPC · JPL
430461	2001 FW_{176}	—	March 16, 2001	Socorro	LINEAR	PHO	1.2 km	MPC · JPL
430462	2001 PH_{14}	—	August 10, 2001	Haleakala	NEAT	·	1.4 km	MPC · JPL
430463	2001 PQ_{18}	—	August 9, 2001	Palomar	NEAT	PHO	2.2 km	MPC · JPL
430464	2001 PL_{25}	—	August 11, 2001	Haleakala	NEAT	·	4.5 km	MPC · JPL
430465	2001 QV_{99}	—	August 22, 2001	Socorro	LINEAR	T_{j} (2.96)	3.8 km	MPC · JPL
430466	2001 QZ_{196}	—	August 22, 2001	Haleakala	NEAT	·	2.1 km	MPC · JPL
430467	2001 QR_{236}	—	August 16, 2001	Socorro	LINEAR	·	2.9 km	MPC · JPL
430468	2001 RW_{18}	—	August 23, 2001	Anderson Mesa	LONEOS	·	2.9 km	MPC · JPL
430469	2001 RG_{58}	—	September 12, 2001	Socorro	LINEAR	NYS	1.2 km	MPC · JPL
430470	2001 RW_{64}	—	September 10, 2001	Socorro	LINEAR	·	3.1 km	MPC · JPL
430471	2001 RJ_{116}	—	September 12, 2001	Socorro	LINEAR	·	2.0 km	MPC · JPL
430472	2001 RG_{118}	—	September 12, 2001	Socorro	LINEAR	MAS	830 m	MPC · JPL
430473	2001 RP_{131}	—	September 12, 2001	Socorro	LINEAR	·	2.9 km	MPC · JPL
430474	2001 SW_{17}	—	September 16, 2001	Socorro	LINEAR	·	1 km	MPC · JPL
430475	2001 SM_{31}	—	September 16, 2001	Socorro	LINEAR	·	1.6 km	MPC · JPL
430476	2001 SO_{93}	—	September 20, 2001	Socorro	LINEAR	·	1.1 km	MPC · JPL
430477	2001 SH_{103}	—	September 20, 2001	Socorro	LINEAR	·	2.2 km	MPC · JPL
430478	2001 SQ_{115}	—	September 20, 2001	Socorro	LINEAR	·	1.0 km	MPC · JPL
430479	2001 SY_{139}	—	September 16, 2001	Socorro	LINEAR	·	3.3 km	MPC · JPL
430480	2001 SN_{167}	—	September 19, 2001	Socorro	LINEAR	·	3.3 km	MPC · JPL
430481	2001 SQ_{198}	—	September 19, 2001	Socorro	LINEAR	·	3.7 km	MPC · JPL
430482	2001 SJ_{240}	—	September 19, 2001	Socorro	LINEAR	·	2.8 km	MPC · JPL
430483	2001 SE_{245}	—	September 19, 2001	Socorro	LINEAR	·	1.1 km	MPC · JPL
430484	2001 ST_{246}	—	September 19, 2001	Socorro	LINEAR	MAS	1.0 km	MPC · JPL
430485	2001 SF_{264}	—	September 24, 2001	Socorro	LINEAR	·	920 m	MPC · JPL
430486	2001 SU_{304}	—	September 20, 2001	Socorro	LINEAR	·	3.0 km	MPC · JPL
430487	2001 SE_{305}	—	September 20, 2001	Socorro	LINEAR	·	1.3 km	MPC · JPL
430488	2001 TG_{39}	—	October 14, 2001	Socorro	LINEAR	·	4.3 km	MPC · JPL
430489	2001 TS_{53}	—	September 10, 2001	Socorro	LINEAR	·	3.5 km	MPC · JPL
430490	2001 TD_{140}	—	September 12, 2001	Socorro	LINEAR	·	1.6 km	MPC · JPL
430491	2001 TL_{163}	—	September 18, 2001	Kitt Peak	Spacewatch	·	4.3 km	MPC · JPL
430492	2001 TB_{185}	—	October 14, 2001	Socorro	LINEAR	·	2.7 km	MPC · JPL
430493	2001 TA_{208}	—	October 11, 2001	Palomar	NEAT	MAS	670 m	MPC · JPL
430494	2001 TZ_{224}	—	October 14, 2001	Socorro	LINEAR	T_{j} (2.95)	3.8 km	MPC · JPL
430495	2001 TF_{256}	—	October 14, 2001	Palomar	NEAT	PHO	3.0 km	MPC · JPL
430496	2001 TM_{259}	—	October 11, 2001	Palomar	NEAT	·	2.9 km	MPC · JPL
430497	2001 UD_{31}	—	October 16, 2001	Socorro	LINEAR	HYG	2.8 km	MPC · JPL
430498	2001 UP_{57}	—	October 17, 2001	Socorro	LINEAR	·	2.7 km	MPC · JPL
430499	2001 UC_{59}	—	October 17, 2001	Socorro	LINEAR	·	1.4 km	MPC · JPL
430500	2001 UX_{61}	—	October 15, 2001	Kitt Peak	Spacewatch	·	2.8 km	MPC · JPL

== 430501–430600 ==
back to top

Designation			Discovery			Properties		Ref
Permanent	Provisional	Named after	Date	Site	Discoverer(s)	Category	Diam.	Ref
430501	2001 UF_{70}	—	October 17, 2001	Kitt Peak	Spacewatch	·	1.5 km	MPC · JPL
430502	2001 UP_{85}	—	October 15, 2001	Socorro	LINEAR	NYS	1.3 km	MPC · JPL
430503	2001 UE_{166}	—	October 20, 2001	Kitt Peak	Spacewatch	·	2.8 km	MPC · JPL
430504	2001 UW_{173}	—	October 18, 2001	Palomar	NEAT	·	3.0 km	MPC · JPL
430505	2001 UM_{176}	—	October 25, 2001	Kitt Peak	Spacewatch	EOS	1.9 km	MPC · JPL
430506	2001 UF_{213}	—	September 18, 2001	Anderson Mesa	LONEOS	EOS	2.0 km	MPC · JPL
430507	2001 UG_{221}	—	October 23, 2001	Socorro	LINEAR	MAR	950 m	MPC · JPL
430508	2001 UM_{228}	—	September 18, 2001	Apache Point	SDSS	·	1.0 km	MPC · JPL
430509	2001 VR_{127}	—	November 11, 2001	Apache Point	SDSS	·	1.5 km	MPC · JPL
430510	2001 WQ_{15}	—	November 19, 2001	Socorro	LINEAR	H	510 m	MPC · JPL
430511	2001 WA_{16}	—	November 26, 2001	Socorro	LINEAR	·	1.9 km	MPC · JPL
430512	2001 WQ_{25}	—	November 17, 2001	Socorro	LINEAR	·	990 m	MPC · JPL
430513	2001 WA_{44}	—	November 18, 2001	Socorro	LINEAR	T_{j} (2.97)	3.7 km	MPC · JPL
430514	2001 XH_{9}	—	December 9, 2001	Socorro	LINEAR	·	1.3 km	MPC · JPL
430515	2001 XJ_{93}	—	December 10, 2001	Socorro	LINEAR	·	1.3 km	MPC · JPL
430516	2001 XM_{116}	—	December 13, 2001	Socorro	LINEAR	(5)	970 m	MPC · JPL
430517	2001 XA_{217}	—	December 14, 2001	Socorro	LINEAR	BRG	1.5 km	MPC · JPL
430518	2001 YS_{23}	—	December 18, 2001	Socorro	LINEAR	·	570 m	MPC · JPL
430519	2001 YA_{94}	—	December 18, 2001	Kitt Peak	Spacewatch	·	4.8 km	MPC · JPL
430520	2001 YE_{157}	—	December 23, 2001	Socorro	LINEAR	MAR	1.3 km	MPC · JPL
430521	2002 AD_{19}	—	December 23, 2001	Socorro	LINEAR	·	1.2 km	MPC · JPL
430522	2002 AT_{78}	—	January 8, 2002	Socorro	LINEAR	·	1.3 km	MPC · JPL
430523	2002 AX_{129}	—	January 15, 2002	Kingsnake	J. V. McClusky	·	1.8 km	MPC · JPL
430524	2002 AL_{171}	—	January 14, 2002	Socorro	LINEAR	·	1.6 km	MPC · JPL
430525	2002 BH_{11}	—	January 19, 2002	Socorro	LINEAR	·	1.8 km	MPC · JPL
430526	2002 BR_{20}	—	January 23, 2002	Socorro	LINEAR	·	1.5 km	MPC · JPL
430527	2002 CK_{2}	—	January 9, 2002	Socorro	LINEAR	·	1.7 km	MPC · JPL
430528	2002 CL_{12}	—	February 7, 2002	Socorro	LINEAR	H	520 m	MPC · JPL
430529	2002 CC_{16}	—	February 10, 2002	Desert Eagle	W. K. Y. Yeung	·	1.7 km	MPC · JPL
430530	2002 CV_{157}	—	February 7, 2002	Socorro	LINEAR	·	1.8 km	MPC · JPL
430531	2002 CV_{184}	—	January 19, 2002	Kitt Peak	Spacewatch	·	2.3 km	MPC · JPL
430532	2002 CX_{232}	—	February 10, 2002	Socorro	LINEAR	·	2.0 km	MPC · JPL
430533	2002 CN_{241}	—	February 11, 2002	Socorro	LINEAR	ADE	2.3 km	MPC · JPL
430534	2002 CQ_{282}	—	February 8, 2002	Kitt Peak	Spacewatch	·	1.5 km	MPC · JPL
430535	2002 CS_{289}	—	February 10, 2002	Socorro	LINEAR	H	550 m	MPC · JPL
430536	2002 DW_{9}	—	April 20, 1998	Socorro	LINEAR	·	1.8 km	MPC · JPL
430537	2002 EB_{72}	—	March 13, 2002	Socorro	LINEAR	EUN	1.4 km	MPC · JPL
430538	2002 EF_{103}	—	March 9, 2002	Palomar	NEAT	·	1.5 km	MPC · JPL
430539	2002 EF_{124}	—	March 12, 2002	Kitt Peak	Spacewatch	·	1.6 km	MPC · JPL
430540	2002 ED_{131}	—	March 12, 2002	Palomar	NEAT	·	720 m	MPC · JPL
430541	2002 EL_{131}	—	March 13, 2002	Kitt Peak	Spacewatch	·	700 m	MPC · JPL
430542	2002 FX_{28}	—	March 9, 2002	Anderson Mesa	LONEOS	·	1.5 km	MPC · JPL
430543	2002 GB_{2}	—	February 22, 2002	Socorro	LINEAR	·	1.7 km	MPC · JPL
430544	2002 GM_{2}	—	April 4, 2002	Palomar	NEAT	APO · PHA	640 m	MPC · JPL
430545	2002 GM_{36}	—	April 2, 2002	Kitt Peak	Spacewatch	H	600 m	MPC · JPL
430546	2002 GA_{49}	—	April 4, 2002	Palomar	NEAT	ADE	2.2 km	MPC · JPL
430547	2002 GB_{58}	—	April 8, 2002	Kitt Peak	Spacewatch	·	1.4 km	MPC · JPL
430548	2002 GZ_{123}	—	April 12, 2002	Socorro	LINEAR	·	1.6 km	MPC · JPL
430549	2002 GQ_{127}	—	April 12, 2002	Socorro	LINEAR	·	3.1 km	MPC · JPL
430550	2002 GY_{134}	—	April 12, 2002	Socorro	LINEAR	·	1.8 km	MPC · JPL
430551	2002 GO_{171}	—	April 10, 2002	Socorro	LINEAR	·	420 m	MPC · JPL
430552	2002 HU_{11}	—	April 22, 2002	Socorro	LINEAR	AMO +1km	910 m	MPC · JPL
430553	2002 JS_{9}	—	May 6, 2002	Socorro	LINEAR	H	580 m	MPC · JPL
430554	2002 JR_{59}	—	May 9, 2002	Socorro	LINEAR	·	2.3 km	MPC · JPL
430555	2002 JT_{67}	—	May 9, 2002	Socorro	LINEAR	H	600 m	MPC · JPL
430556	2002 JE_{86}	—	May 11, 2002	Socorro	LINEAR	·	1.6 km	MPC · JPL
430557	2002 JM_{148}	—	May 4, 2002	Palomar	NEAT	·	2.8 km	MPC · JPL
430558	2002 KN_{14}	—	May 30, 2002	Palomar	NEAT	·	2.0 km	MPC · JPL
430559	2002 LE_{63}	—	June 13, 2002	Palomar	NEAT	·	720 m	MPC · JPL
430560	2002 NC_{32}	—	July 13, 2002	Socorro	LINEAR	·	2.2 km	MPC · JPL
430561	2002 NB_{52}	—	July 14, 2002	Socorro	LINEAR	·	740 m	MPC · JPL
430562	2002 NX_{72}	—	July 8, 2002	Palomar	NEAT	·	770 m	MPC · JPL
430563	2002 NF_{74}	—	July 14, 2002	Palomar	NEAT	·	1.7 km	MPC · JPL
430564	2002 PW_{32}	—	August 6, 2002	Palomar	NEAT	·	3.0 km	MPC · JPL
430565	2002 PU_{112}	—	August 12, 2002	Socorro	LINEAR	·	1.8 km	MPC · JPL
430566	2002 PK_{162}	—	August 8, 2002	Palomar	S. F. Hönig	DOR	2.8 km	MPC · JPL
430567	2002 PO_{169}	—	August 11, 2002	Haleakala	NEAT	·	810 m	MPC · JPL
430568	2002 PW_{172}	—	August 11, 2002	Palomar	NEAT	·	590 m	MPC · JPL
430569	2002 PA_{183}	—	August 8, 2002	Palomar	NEAT	·	2.0 km	MPC · JPL
430570	2002 QT_{43}	—	August 30, 2002	Palomar	NEAT	·	970 m	MPC · JPL
430571	2002 QG_{51}	—	August 16, 2002	Palomar	Lowe, A.	·	2.8 km	MPC · JPL
430572	2002 QV_{52}	—	August 29, 2002	Palomar	S. F. Hönig	NYS	1.1 km	MPC · JPL
430573	2002 QU_{55}	—	August 29, 2002	Palomar	S. F. Hönig	·	1.2 km	MPC · JPL
430574	2002 QC_{67}	—	August 18, 2002	Palomar	NEAT	·	2.2 km	MPC · JPL
430575	2002 QT_{76}	—	August 27, 2002	Palomar	NEAT	·	760 m	MPC · JPL
430576	2002 QG_{79}	—	August 17, 2002	Palomar	NEAT	MAS	770 m	MPC · JPL
430577	2002 QV_{80}	—	August 30, 2002	Palomar	NEAT	·	770 m	MPC · JPL
430578	2002 QL_{84}	—	August 16, 2002	Palomar	NEAT	DOR	2.7 km	MPC · JPL
430579	2002 QP_{107}	—	August 17, 2002	Palomar	NEAT	NYS	1.1 km	MPC · JPL
430580	2002 QR_{112}	—	August 17, 2002	Palomar	NEAT	·	740 m	MPC · JPL
430581	2002 QY_{116}	—	August 29, 2002	Palomar	NEAT	KOR	1.6 km	MPC · JPL
430582	2002 QG_{123}	—	August 29, 2002	Palomar	NEAT	·	1 km	MPC · JPL
430583	2002 QK_{134}	—	August 30, 2002	Palomar	NEAT	·	690 m	MPC · JPL
430584	2002 QP_{135}	—	August 30, 2002	Palomar	NEAT	DOR	2.4 km	MPC · JPL
430585	2002 QA_{139}	—	August 17, 2002	Palomar	NEAT	(13314)	2.5 km	MPC · JPL
430586	2002 RM_{66}	—	September 6, 2002	Socorro	LINEAR	PHO	860 m	MPC · JPL
430587	2002 RL_{137}	—	September 13, 2002	Palomar	NEAT	·	380 m	MPC · JPL
430588	2002 RK_{177}	—	September 13, 2002	Palomar	NEAT	·	660 m	MPC · JPL
430589	2002 RT_{217}	—	September 14, 2002	Palomar	NEAT	·	1.8 km	MPC · JPL
430590	2002 RA_{268}	—	September 12, 2002	Palomar	NEAT	·	700 m	MPC · JPL
430591	2002 SY_{12}	—	September 27, 2002	Palomar	NEAT	·	2.4 km	MPC · JPL
430592	2002 SZ_{18}	—	August 14, 2002	Socorro	LINEAR	·	790 m	MPC · JPL
430593	2002 SK_{38}	—	September 30, 2002	Socorro	LINEAR	·	1.7 km	MPC · JPL
430594	2002 SC_{40}	—	September 7, 2002	Socorro	LINEAR	NYS	1.1 km	MPC · JPL
430595	2002 SG_{54}	—	August 12, 2002	Socorro	LINEAR	·	1.3 km	MPC · JPL
430596	2002 SD_{62}	—	September 17, 2002	Palomar	NEAT	·	1.9 km	MPC · JPL
430597	2002 SP_{71}	—	September 26, 2002	Palomar	NEAT	EOS	1.8 km	MPC · JPL
430598	2002 SZ_{74}	—	September 26, 1995	Kitt Peak	Spacewatch	·	680 m	MPC · JPL
430599	2002 TA_{20}	—	October 2, 2002	Socorro	LINEAR	·	2.7 km	MPC · JPL
430600	2002 TN_{181}	—	September 7, 2002	Socorro	LINEAR	·	3.0 km	MPC · JPL

== 430601–430700 ==
back to top

Designation			Discovery			Properties		Ref
Permanent	Provisional	Named after	Date	Site	Discoverer(s)	Category	Diam.	Ref
430601	2002 TF_{204}	—	October 4, 2002	Socorro	LINEAR	·	940 m	MPC · JPL
430602	2002 TM_{310}	—	January 30, 2000	Kitt Peak	Spacewatch	V	500 m	MPC · JPL
430603	2002 TH_{338}	—	October 5, 2002	Apache Point	SDSS	·	2.2 km	MPC · JPL
430604	2002 TO_{353}	—	October 10, 2002	Apache Point	SDSS	·	2.2 km	MPC · JPL
430605	2002 TF_{367}	—	October 10, 2002	Apache Point	SDSS	·	1.8 km	MPC · JPL
430606	2002 UU_{60}	—	October 29, 2002	Apache Point	SDSS	·	1.7 km	MPC · JPL
430607	2002 UC_{72}	—	October 18, 2002	Palomar	NEAT	·	1.1 km	MPC · JPL
430608	2002 VD_{13}	—	November 4, 2002	Palomar	NEAT	·	970 m	MPC · JPL
430609	2002 WP_{1}	—	November 23, 2002	Palomar	NEAT	·	2.0 km	MPC · JPL
430610	2002 WM_{7}	—	November 7, 2002	Kitt Peak	Spacewatch	·	2.5 km	MPC · JPL
430611	2002 WT_{19}	—	November 24, 2002	Palomar	S. F. Hönig	EOS	1.8 km	MPC · JPL
430612	2002 WU_{21}	—	November 25, 2002	Palomar	NEAT	·	3.0 km	MPC · JPL
430613	2002 WE_{30}	—	November 24, 2002	Palomar	NEAT	·	1.4 km	MPC · JPL
430614	2002 XL_{51}	—	December 10, 2002	Socorro	LINEAR	·	2.7 km	MPC · JPL
430615	2002 XK_{117}	—	December 10, 2002	Palomar	NEAT	LIX	4.1 km	MPC · JPL
430616	2002 YJ_{6}	—	December 28, 2002	Socorro	LINEAR	T_{j} (2.97)	3.8 km	MPC · JPL
430617	2003 BP	—	January 24, 2003	Palomar	NEAT	·	1.3 km	MPC · JPL
430618	2003 BX_{8}	—	January 26, 2003	Anderson Mesa	LONEOS	·	2.9 km	MPC · JPL
430619	2003 CX	—	February 1, 2003	Socorro	LINEAR	·	4.5 km	MPC · JPL
430620	2003 DT_{9}	—	February 22, 2003	Palomar	NEAT	·	3.5 km	MPC · JPL
430621	2003 EH_{19}	—	March 6, 2003	Anderson Mesa	LONEOS	·	3.3 km	MPC · JPL
430622	2003 EO_{63}	—	March 11, 2003	Palomar	NEAT	·	3.5 km	MPC · JPL
430623	2003 FG_{133}	—	March 26, 2003	Kitt Peak	Spacewatch	L4	9.0 km	MPC · JPL
430624	2003 GA_{28}	—	April 7, 2003	Kitt Peak	Spacewatch	·	910 m	MPC · JPL
430625	2003 GZ_{50}	—	April 8, 2003	Haleakala	NEAT	·	3.4 km	MPC · JPL
430626	2003 QH_{8}	—	August 5, 2003	Socorro	LINEAR	JUN	1.2 km	MPC · JPL
430627	2003 QM_{15}	—	August 20, 2003	Palomar	NEAT	·	890 m	MPC · JPL
430628	2003 QN_{23}	—	August 20, 2003	Campo Imperatore	CINEOS	·	1.2 km	MPC · JPL
430629	2003 QW_{27}	—	August 23, 2003	Kleť	Kleť	·	1.9 km	MPC · JPL
430630	2003 QU_{72}	—	August 23, 2003	Palomar	NEAT	·	690 m	MPC · JPL
430631	2003 QL_{73}	—	August 24, 2003	Socorro	LINEAR	EUN	1.2 km	MPC · JPL
430632	2003 QS_{75}	—	August 24, 2003	Socorro	LINEAR	·	2.0 km	MPC · JPL
430633	2003 QH_{90}	—	August 26, 2003	Črni Vrh	Mikuž, H.	PHO	1.0 km	MPC · JPL
430634	2003 RF_{10}	—	September 3, 2003	Bergisch Gladbach	W. Bickel	·	690 m	MPC · JPL
430635	2003 RR_{18}	—	September 15, 2003	Anderson Mesa	LONEOS	·	1.3 km	MPC · JPL
430636	2003 SF_{48}	—	September 18, 2003	Palomar	NEAT	JUN	1.1 km	MPC · JPL
430637	2003 SA_{50}	—	September 18, 2003	Palomar	NEAT	·	770 m	MPC · JPL
430638	2003 SA_{58}	—	August 26, 2003	Socorro	LINEAR	·	2.3 km	MPC · JPL
430639	2003 SG_{64}	—	September 18, 2003	Campo Imperatore	CINEOS	H	620 m	MPC · JPL
430640	2003 SJ_{68}	—	September 17, 2003	Kitt Peak	Spacewatch	·	1.5 km	MPC · JPL
430641	2003 SM_{69}	—	September 17, 2003	Kitt Peak	Spacewatch	HOF	2.4 km	MPC · JPL
430642	2003 SE_{89}	—	August 25, 2003	Socorro	LINEAR	EUN	1.4 km	MPC · JPL
430643	2003 SU_{105}	—	September 20, 2003	Palomar	NEAT	·	3.0 km	MPC · JPL
430644	2003 SZ_{132}	—	September 19, 2003	Kitt Peak	Spacewatch	·	660 m	MPC · JPL
430645	2003 SU_{135}	—	September 19, 2003	Campo Imperatore	CINEOS	·	2.0 km	MPC · JPL
430646	2003 SH_{139}	—	September 18, 2003	Anderson Mesa	LONEOS	·	2.5 km	MPC · JPL
430647	2003 SO_{174}	—	September 18, 2003	Kitt Peak	Spacewatch	·	1.9 km	MPC · JPL
430648	2003 SX_{186}	—	September 22, 2003	Anderson Mesa	LONEOS	·	2.2 km	MPC · JPL
430649	2003 SN_{193}	—	August 28, 2003	Socorro	LINEAR	GEF	1.2 km	MPC · JPL
430650	2003 SR_{205}	—	September 16, 2003	Kitt Peak	Spacewatch	·	1.9 km	MPC · JPL
430651	2003 SO_{229}	—	September 27, 2003	Kitt Peak	Spacewatch	·	1.9 km	MPC · JPL
430652	2003 SJ_{238}	—	August 25, 2003	Socorro	LINEAR	·	1.7 km	MPC · JPL
430653	2003 SO_{274}	—	September 16, 2003	Kitt Peak	Spacewatch	·	2.2 km	MPC · JPL
430654	2003 SJ_{293}	—	September 4, 2003	Socorro	LINEAR	·	2.7 km	MPC · JPL
430655	2003 SY_{325}	—	September 18, 2003	Palomar	NEAT	H	520 m	MPC · JPL
430656	2003 SD_{335}	—	September 26, 2003	Apache Point	SDSS	AST	1.5 km	MPC · JPL
430657	2003 SC_{338}	—	September 24, 2003	Palomar	NEAT	·	2.6 km	MPC · JPL
430658	2003 SO_{353}	—	September 18, 2003	Kitt Peak	Spacewatch	BRA	1.3 km	MPC · JPL
430659	2003 SH_{360}	—	September 21, 2003	Kitt Peak	Spacewatch	EUN	1.2 km	MPC · JPL
430660	2003 SG_{362}	—	September 22, 2003	Kitt Peak	Spacewatch	·	630 m	MPC · JPL
430661	2003 ST_{363}	—	September 26, 2003	Apache Point	SDSS	·	1.7 km	MPC · JPL
430662	2003 SP_{421}	—	September 29, 2003	Apache Point	SDSS	·	2.7 km	MPC · JPL
430663	2003 UO_{3}	—	October 17, 2003	Socorro	LINEAR	·	1.1 km	MPC · JPL
430664	2003 UB_{4}	—	September 21, 2003	Anderson Mesa	LONEOS	H	570 m	MPC · JPL
430665	2003 UQ_{76}	—	October 17, 2003	Anderson Mesa	LONEOS	·	730 m	MPC · JPL
430666	2003 UW_{95}	—	September 20, 2003	Palomar	NEAT	JUN	1.2 km	MPC · JPL
430667	2003 UD_{196}	—	October 21, 2003	Kitt Peak	Spacewatch	·	2.0 km	MPC · JPL
430668	2003 US_{197}	—	October 21, 2003	Anderson Mesa	LONEOS	·	2.3 km	MPC · JPL
430669	2003 UZ_{242}	—	October 24, 2003	Socorro	LINEAR	BRA	1.7 km	MPC · JPL
430670	2003 UR_{269}	—	October 19, 2003	Kitt Peak	Spacewatch	DOR	2.9 km	MPC · JPL
430671	2003 UC_{294}	—	October 16, 2003	Kitt Peak	Spacewatch	·	2.2 km	MPC · JPL
430672	2003 UJ_{324}	—	October 17, 2003	Apache Point	SDSS	·	1.7 km	MPC · JPL
430673	2003 UL_{324}	—	October 17, 2003	Apache Point	SDSS	·	2.0 km	MPC · JPL
430674	2003 UJ_{332}	—	October 18, 2003	Apache Point	SDSS	·	1.5 km	MPC · JPL
430675	2003 UF_{348}	—	October 19, 2003	Apache Point	SDSS	·	1.8 km	MPC · JPL
430676	2003 VD	—	November 3, 2003	Socorro	LINEAR	H	810 m	MPC · JPL
430677	2003 VV_{4}	—	November 15, 2003	Kitt Peak	Spacewatch	·	2.1 km	MPC · JPL
430678	2003 VM_{10}	—	November 15, 2003	Palomar	NEAT	H	620 m	MPC · JPL
430679	2003 WE_{24}	—	November 18, 2003	Palomar	NEAT	H	650 m	MPC · JPL
430680	2003 WM_{51}	—	November 19, 2003	Kitt Peak	Spacewatch	·	580 m	MPC · JPL
430681	2003 WJ_{54}	—	October 25, 2003	Socorro	LINEAR	·	1.9 km	MPC · JPL
430682	2003 WV_{72}	—	October 29, 2003	Socorro	LINEAR	·	850 m	MPC · JPL
430683	2003 WC_{93}	—	November 19, 2003	Anderson Mesa	LONEOS	·	1.0 km	MPC · JPL
430684	2003 WR_{93}	—	November 19, 2003	Anderson Mesa	LONEOS	·	720 m	MPC · JPL
430685	2003 WP_{99}	—	November 20, 2003	Socorro	LINEAR	BRA	1.7 km	MPC · JPL
430686	2003 WM_{110}	—	October 18, 2003	Kitt Peak	Spacewatch	·	700 m	MPC · JPL
430687	2003 WX_{158}	—	November 15, 2003	Kitt Peak	Spacewatch	·	720 m	MPC · JPL
430688	2003 WB_{166}	—	November 30, 2003	Nogales	Tenagra II	H	530 m	MPC · JPL
430689	2003 XL_{10}	—	December 5, 2003	Nogales	M. Schwartz, P. R. Holvorcem	·	2.2 km	MPC · JPL
430690	2003 XR_{32}	—	December 1, 2003	Kitt Peak	Spacewatch	·	1.2 km	MPC · JPL
430691	2003 YO_{17}	—	December 21, 2003	Kitt Peak	Spacewatch	H	560 m	MPC · JPL
430692	2003 YB_{25}	—	December 18, 2003	Socorro	LINEAR	·	1.3 km	MPC · JPL
430693	2003 YN_{39}	—	December 19, 2003	Kitt Peak	Spacewatch	·	1.3 km	MPC · JPL
430694	2003 YZ_{39}	—	December 19, 2003	Kitt Peak	Spacewatch	·	2.1 km	MPC · JPL
430695	2003 YX_{117}	—	December 17, 2003	Socorro	LINEAR	H	670 m	MPC · JPL
430696	2004 BS_{5}	—	January 16, 2004	Kitt Peak	Spacewatch	·	720 m	MPC · JPL
430697	2004 BK_{58}	—	January 23, 2004	Socorro	LINEAR	·	2.2 km	MPC · JPL
430698	2004 BD_{90}	—	January 23, 2004	Anderson Mesa	LONEOS	PHO	1.4 km	MPC · JPL
430699	2004 BM_{100}	—	January 19, 2004	Kitt Peak	Spacewatch	ERI	1.1 km	MPC · JPL
430700	2004 BW_{135}	—	January 19, 2004	Kitt Peak	Spacewatch	·	860 m	MPC · JPL

== 430701–430800 ==
back to top

Designation			Discovery			Properties		Ref
Permanent	Provisional	Named after	Date	Site	Discoverer(s)	Category	Diam.	Ref
430701	2004 CU_{9}	—	January 22, 2004	Socorro	LINEAR	·	2.9 km	MPC · JPL
430702	2004 CR_{18}	—	February 10, 2004	Palomar	NEAT	·	1.1 km	MPC · JPL
430703	2004 CY_{20}	—	February 11, 2004	Kitt Peak	Spacewatch	BRA	1.7 km	MPC · JPL
430704	2004 CT_{39}	—	February 12, 2004	Goodricke-Pigott	Goodricke-Pigott	·	3.7 km	MPC · JPL
430705	2004 CB_{48}	—	February 14, 2004	Haleakala	NEAT	·	3.8 km	MPC · JPL
430706	2004 CG_{55}	—	February 12, 2004	Kitt Peak	Spacewatch	·	860 m	MPC · JPL
430707	2004 DZ_{45}	—	February 19, 2004	Socorro	LINEAR	·	960 m	MPC · JPL
430708	2004 DB_{56}	—	February 22, 2004	Kitt Peak	Spacewatch	·	850 m	MPC · JPL
430709	2004 DF_{56}	—	February 22, 2004	Kitt Peak	Spacewatch	·	790 m	MPC · JPL
430710	2004 DL_{57}	—	February 23, 2004	Socorro	LINEAR	·	2.8 km	MPC · JPL
430711	2004 EY_{3}	—	March 10, 2004	Palomar	NEAT	H	600 m	MPC · JPL
430712	2004 EK_{4}	—	March 11, 2004	Palomar	NEAT	·	3.4 km	MPC · JPL
430713	2004 EN_{9}	—	March 14, 2004	Socorro	LINEAR	·	380 m	MPC · JPL
430714	2004 EQ_{11}	—	February 17, 2004	Socorro	LINEAR	·	2.7 km	MPC · JPL
430715	2004 EN_{19}	—	March 14, 2004	Kitt Peak	Spacewatch	·	2.2 km	MPC · JPL
430716	2004 EZ_{33}	—	March 12, 2004	Palomar	NEAT	·	1.0 km	MPC · JPL
430717	2004 ET_{51}	—	February 15, 2004	Catalina	CSS	·	1.1 km	MPC · JPL
430718	2004 EB_{53}	—	March 15, 2004	Socorro	LINEAR	·	3.4 km	MPC · JPL
430719	2004 EO_{66}	—	March 14, 2004	Socorro	LINEAR	H	660 m	MPC · JPL
430720	2004 EK_{73}	—	March 15, 2004	Catalina	CSS	·	1.1 km	MPC · JPL
430721	2004 EO_{76}	—	March 15, 2004	Kitt Peak	Spacewatch	·	4.0 km	MPC · JPL
430722	2004 FG_{3}	—	March 18, 2004	Socorro	LINEAR	PHO	1.0 km	MPC · JPL
430723	2004 FY_{4}	—	March 18, 2004	Socorro	LINEAR	H	600 m	MPC · JPL
430724	2004 FY_{40}	—	March 18, 2004	Socorro	LINEAR	·	1.2 km	MPC · JPL
430725	2004 FB_{53}	—	March 19, 2004	Socorro	LINEAR	·	2.7 km	MPC · JPL
430726	2004 FV_{84}	—	March 18, 2004	Socorro	LINEAR	·	2.5 km	MPC · JPL
430727	2004 FU_{90}	—	February 29, 2004	Kitt Peak	Spacewatch	·	3.3 km	MPC · JPL
430728	2004 FR_{100}	—	March 23, 2004	Kitt Peak	Spacewatch	·	1.1 km	MPC · JPL
430729	2004 FD_{130}	—	March 22, 2004	Anderson Mesa	LONEOS	·	4.2 km	MPC · JPL
430730	2004 GE_{15}	—	April 12, 2004	Socorro	LINEAR	H	730 m	MPC · JPL
430731	2004 GL_{23}	—	April 12, 2004	Kitt Peak	Spacewatch	·	1.3 km	MPC · JPL
430732	2004 GW_{34}	—	April 13, 2004	Palomar	NEAT	·	1.4 km	MPC · JPL
430733	2004 GS_{41}	—	April 13, 2004	Kitt Peak	Spacewatch	·	4.6 km	MPC · JPL
430734	2004 GA_{44}	—	April 12, 2004	Kitt Peak	Spacewatch	NYS	1.0 km	MPC · JPL
430735	2004 GD_{47}	—	April 12, 2004	Kitt Peak	Spacewatch	·	1.2 km	MPC · JPL
430736	2004 GN_{57}	—	April 14, 2004	Kitt Peak	Spacewatch	·	2.2 km	MPC · JPL
430737	2004 GR_{74}	—	April 15, 2004	Socorro	LINEAR	·	3.7 km	MPC · JPL
430738	2004 HH_{21}	—	April 16, 2004	Kitt Peak	Spacewatch	L4	10 km	MPC · JPL
430739	2004 HA_{32}	—	April 19, 2004	Socorro	LINEAR	·	1.5 km	MPC · JPL
430740	2004 HQ_{47}	—	April 22, 2004	Catalina	CSS	·	2.9 km	MPC · JPL
430741	2004 HM_{56}	—	April 25, 2004	Anderson Mesa	LONEOS	T_{j} (2.97)	3.5 km	MPC · JPL
430742	2004 HN_{56}	—	April 25, 2004	Anderson Mesa	LONEOS	PHO	1.1 km	MPC · JPL
430743	2004 JP_{31}	—	May 15, 2004	Campo Imperatore	CINEOS	·	4.1 km	MPC · JPL
430744	2004 JG_{42}	—	May 14, 2004	Kitt Peak	Spacewatch	·	2.7 km	MPC · JPL
430745	2004 KX_{8}	—	May 18, 2004	Socorro	LINEAR	·	1.3 km	MPC · JPL
430746	2004 LN_{1}	—	June 10, 2004	Socorro	LINEAR	·	2.7 km	MPC · JPL
430747	2004 NE	—	July 7, 2004	Campo Imperatore	CINEOS	PHO	1.0 km	MPC · JPL
430748	2004 NJ_{30}	—	June 30, 2004	Siding Spring	SSS	·	2.0 km	MPC · JPL
430749	2004 NW_{33}	—	July 13, 2004	Siding Spring	SSS	·	1.5 km	MPC · JPL
430750	2004 PZ_{11}	—	August 7, 2004	Palomar	NEAT	·	1.2 km	MPC · JPL
430751	2004 PJ_{20}	—	June 16, 2004	Kitt Peak	Spacewatch	·	1.4 km	MPC · JPL
430752	2004 PR_{27}	—	August 9, 2004	Reedy Creek	J. Broughton	·	1.6 km	MPC · JPL
430753	2004 PX_{104}	—	August 5, 2004	Palomar	NEAT	·	1.8 km	MPC · JPL
430754	2004 QQ_{13}	—	August 22, 2004	Reedy Creek	J. Broughton	EUN	1.4 km	MPC · JPL
430755	2004 RH_{16}	—	September 7, 2004	Kitt Peak	Spacewatch	·	1.8 km	MPC · JPL
430756	2004 RO_{20}	—	September 7, 2004	Kitt Peak	Spacewatch	·	1.3 km	MPC · JPL
430757	2004 RU_{52}	—	September 8, 2004	Socorro	LINEAR	·	1.3 km	MPC · JPL
430758	2004 RW_{52}	—	August 11, 2004	Socorro	LINEAR	(1547)	1.7 km	MPC · JPL
430759	2004 RE_{65}	—	September 8, 2004	Socorro	LINEAR	·	1.5 km	MPC · JPL
430760	2004 RF_{66}	—	September 8, 2004	Socorro	LINEAR	·	2.9 km	MPC · JPL
430761	2004 RL_{93}	—	August 25, 2004	Kitt Peak	Spacewatch	·	1.8 km	MPC · JPL
430762	2004 RP_{136}	—	September 7, 2004	Palomar	NEAT	·	1.5 km	MPC · JPL
430763	2004 RF_{146}	—	September 9, 2004	Socorro	LINEAR	MAR	1.2 km	MPC · JPL
430764	2004 RM_{156}	—	September 10, 2004	Socorro	LINEAR	·	1.4 km	MPC · JPL
430765	2004 RU_{174}	—	September 10, 2004	Socorro	LINEAR	ADE	1.8 km	MPC · JPL
430766	2004 RC_{184}	—	September 10, 2004	Socorro	LINEAR	·	1.7 km	MPC · JPL
430767	2004 RY_{243}	—	September 10, 2004	Kitt Peak	Spacewatch	·	1.5 km	MPC · JPL
430768	2004 RV_{246}	—	September 11, 2004	Socorro	LINEAR	·	1.4 km	MPC · JPL
430769	2004 RW_{248}	—	September 12, 2004	Socorro	LINEAR	·	2.9 km	MPC · JPL
430770	2004 RZ_{250}	—	September 14, 2004	Socorro	LINEAR	EUN	1.2 km	MPC · JPL
430771	2004 RY_{276}	—	September 13, 2004	Kitt Peak	Spacewatch	·	1.7 km	MPC · JPL
430772	2004 RE_{299}	—	September 11, 2004	Kitt Peak	Spacewatch	WIT	910 m	MPC · JPL
430773	2004 RV_{331}	—	September 11, 2004	Kitt Peak	Spacewatch	·	1.9 km	MPC · JPL
430774	2004 RT_{346}	—	September 11, 2004	Socorro	LINEAR	·	2.5 km	MPC · JPL
430775	2004 SN_{12}	—	September 17, 2004	Socorro	LINEAR	·	1.3 km	MPC · JPL
430776	2004 SZ_{38}	—	August 12, 2004	Socorro	LINEAR	·	2.0 km	MPC · JPL
430777	2004 TS_{10}	—	October 7, 2004	Socorro	LINEAR	·	910 m	MPC · JPL
430778	2004 TB_{31}	—	September 9, 2004	Kitt Peak	Spacewatch	·	1.7 km	MPC · JPL
430779	2004 TP_{92}	—	October 5, 2004	Kitt Peak	Spacewatch	·	1.8 km	MPC · JPL
430780	2004 TN_{100}	—	October 6, 2004	Palomar	NEAT	·	1.7 km	MPC · JPL
430781	2004 TA_{105}	—	October 7, 2004	Kitt Peak	Spacewatch	EUN	1.3 km	MPC · JPL
430782	2004 TJ_{120}	—	October 6, 2004	Palomar	NEAT	ADE	2.0 km	MPC · JPL
430783	2004 TA_{169}	—	October 7, 2004	Socorro	LINEAR	·	1.9 km	MPC · JPL
430784	2004 TW_{173}	—	October 8, 2004	Socorro	LINEAR	(1547)	2.4 km	MPC · JPL
430785	2004 TJ_{196}	—	October 7, 2004	Kitt Peak	Spacewatch	·	2.2 km	MPC · JPL
430786	2004 TT_{244}	—	October 7, 2004	Kitt Peak	Spacewatch	·	1.4 km	MPC · JPL
430787	2004 TL_{263}	—	October 9, 2004	Kitt Peak	Spacewatch	·	1.4 km	MPC · JPL
430788	2004 TH_{279}	—	October 10, 2004	Socorro	LINEAR	·	2.7 km	MPC · JPL
430789	2004 TK_{292}	—	October 10, 2004	Kitt Peak	Spacewatch	·	3.1 km	MPC · JPL
430790	2004 TS_{292}	—	October 10, 2004	Socorro	LINEAR	·	1.7 km	MPC · JPL
430791	2004 TY_{295}	—	October 10, 2004	Kitt Peak	Spacewatch	·	530 m	MPC · JPL
430792	2004 TG_{309}	—	October 10, 2004	Socorro	LINEAR	·	2.3 km	MPC · JPL
430793	2004 TW_{327}	—	October 4, 2004	Palomar	NEAT	·	1.3 km	MPC · JPL
430794	2004 VS	—	November 2, 2004	Anderson Mesa	LONEOS	·	1.7 km	MPC · JPL
430795	2004 VW_{36}	—	October 15, 2004	Mount Lemmon	Mount Lemmon Survey	·	2.6 km	MPC · JPL
430796	2004 VV_{37}	—	November 4, 2004	Kitt Peak	Spacewatch	·	1.5 km	MPC · JPL
430797	2004 VA_{39}	—	October 15, 2004	Kitt Peak	Spacewatch	·	1.5 km	MPC · JPL
430798	2004 VJ_{40}	—	October 23, 2004	Kitt Peak	Spacewatch	·	1.5 km	MPC · JPL
430799	2004 VQ_{52}	—	November 4, 2004	Catalina	CSS	·	2.4 km	MPC · JPL
430800	2004 VO_{71}	—	October 15, 2004	Mount Lemmon	Mount Lemmon Survey	·	2.7 km	MPC · JPL

== 430801–430900 ==
back to top

Designation			Discovery			Properties		Ref
Permanent	Provisional	Named after	Date	Site	Discoverer(s)	Category	Diam.	Ref
430801	2004 VU_{95}	—	October 23, 2004	Kitt Peak	Spacewatch	·	1.8 km	MPC · JPL
430802	2004 XK_{4}	—	December 7, 2004	Socorro	LINEAR	AMO	210 m	MPC · JPL
430803	2004 XW_{18}	—	December 8, 2004	Socorro	LINEAR	·	2.2 km	MPC · JPL
430804	2005 AD_{13}	—	January 9, 2005	Catalina	CSS	APO +1km · PHA	940 m	MPC · JPL
430805	2005 AJ_{67}	—	December 20, 2004	Mount Lemmon	Mount Lemmon Survey	·	1.6 km	MPC · JPL
430806	2005 BG_{49}	—	January 17, 2005	Kitt Peak	Spacewatch	GEF	1.5 km	MPC · JPL
430807	2005 CY_{31}	—	February 1, 2005	Kitt Peak	Spacewatch	·	1.6 km	MPC · JPL
430808	2005 CH_{63}	—	February 9, 2005	Mount Lemmon	Mount Lemmon Survey	·	560 m	MPC · JPL
430809	2005 EE_{72}	—	March 2, 2005	Catalina	CSS	·	2.0 km	MPC · JPL
430810	2005 ES_{106}	—	March 4, 2005	Mount Lemmon	Mount Lemmon Survey	·	2.6 km	MPC · JPL
430811	2005 ED_{123}	—	March 8, 2005	Kitt Peak	Spacewatch	·	2.5 km	MPC · JPL
430812	2005 EK_{161}	—	March 9, 2005	Mount Lemmon	Mount Lemmon Survey	·	1.8 km	MPC · JPL
430813	2005 ET_{164}	—	March 11, 2005	Kitt Peak	Spacewatch	·	1.3 km	MPC · JPL
430814	2005 EN_{188}	—	March 10, 2005	Mount Lemmon	Mount Lemmon Survey	H	340 m	MPC · JPL
430815	2005 EQ_{224}	—	March 4, 2005	Catalina	CSS	H	500 m	MPC · JPL
430816	2005 EE_{259}	—	March 11, 2005	Mount Lemmon	Mount Lemmon Survey	·	1.6 km	MPC · JPL
430817	2005 GO_{32}	—	March 11, 2005	Mount Lemmon	Mount Lemmon Survey	·	1.8 km	MPC · JPL
430818	2005 GU_{54}	—	March 17, 2005	Kitt Peak	Spacewatch	KOR	1.3 km	MPC · JPL
430819	2005 GZ_{70}	—	April 4, 2005	Kitt Peak	Spacewatch	·	560 m	MPC · JPL
430820	2005 GJ_{73}	—	April 4, 2005	Catalina	CSS	·	750 m	MPC · JPL
430821	2005 GG_{75}	—	April 5, 2005	Mount Lemmon	Mount Lemmon Survey	·	2.2 km	MPC · JPL
430822	2005 GS_{96}	—	April 6, 2005	Mount Lemmon	Mount Lemmon Survey	·	2.1 km	MPC · JPL
430823	2005 GC_{134}	—	April 10, 2005	Kitt Peak	Spacewatch	·	1.8 km	MPC · JPL
430824	2005 GN_{147}	—	April 11, 2005	Kitt Peak	Spacewatch	·	650 m	MPC · JPL
430825	2005 GX_{154}	—	April 10, 2005	Mount Lemmon	Mount Lemmon Survey	·	2.1 km	MPC · JPL
430826	2005 GQ_{205}	—	April 11, 2005	Kitt Peak	M. W. Buie	·	450 m	MPC · JPL
430827	2005 JT_{2}	—	May 3, 2005	Kitt Peak	Spacewatch	·	470 m	MPC · JPL
430828	2005 JS_{37}	—	May 6, 2005	Mount Lemmon	Mount Lemmon Survey	·	610 m	MPC · JPL
430829	2005 JN_{49}	—	May 4, 2005	Kitt Peak	Spacewatch	·	3.3 km	MPC · JPL
430830	2005 JF_{59}	—	May 8, 2005	Mount Lemmon	Mount Lemmon Survey	·	650 m	MPC · JPL
430831	2005 JP_{63}	—	May 7, 2005	Catalina	CSS	·	3.8 km	MPC · JPL
430832	2005 JL_{68}	—	May 6, 2005	Catalina	CSS	·	2.9 km	MPC · JPL
430833	2005 JT_{74}	—	May 8, 2005	Mount Lemmon	Mount Lemmon Survey	·	3.7 km	MPC · JPL
430834	2005 JW_{93}	—	May 3, 2005	Kitt Peak	Spacewatch	H	560 m	MPC · JPL
430835	2005 JF_{94}	—	May 6, 2005	Socorro	LINEAR	·	3.3 km	MPC · JPL
430836	2005 JO_{99}	—	May 9, 2005	Kitt Peak	Spacewatch	·	3.6 km	MPC · JPL
430837	2005 JF_{113}	—	May 10, 2005	Kitt Peak	Spacewatch	·	920 m	MPC · JPL
430838	2005 JX_{118}	—	May 10, 2005	Mount Lemmon	Mount Lemmon Survey	·	2.7 km	MPC · JPL
430839	2005 JO_{120}	—	May 10, 2005	Kitt Peak	Spacewatch	L4	8.4 km	MPC · JPL
430840	2005 JH_{121}	—	May 10, 2005	Kitt Peak	Spacewatch	·	610 m	MPC · JPL
430841	2005 JC_{139}	—	May 13, 2005	Mount Lemmon	Mount Lemmon Survey	·	730 m	MPC · JPL
430842	2005 KG_{8}	—	May 20, 2005	Palomar	NEAT	·	1.8 km	MPC · JPL
430843	2005 LX_{4}	—	May 10, 2005	Kitt Peak	Spacewatch	HYG	2.9 km	MPC · JPL
430844	2005 LE_{8}	—	June 1, 2005	Kitt Peak	Spacewatch	·	730 m	MPC · JPL
430845	2005 LL_{13}	—	June 4, 2005	Kitt Peak	Spacewatch	·	830 m	MPC · JPL
430846	2005 LG_{16}	—	June 5, 2005	Kitt Peak	Spacewatch	·	3.8 km	MPC · JPL
430847	2005 LA_{19}	—	June 8, 2005	Kitt Peak	Spacewatch	·	980 m	MPC · JPL
430848	2005 LW_{25}	—	June 8, 2005	Kitt Peak	Spacewatch	·	2.1 km	MPC · JPL
430849	2005 LH_{32}	—	May 16, 2005	Mount Lemmon	Mount Lemmon Survey	·	2.8 km	MPC · JPL
430850	2005 LF_{46}	—	June 13, 2005	Mount Lemmon	Mount Lemmon Survey	·	4.3 km	MPC · JPL
430851	2005 LT_{53}	—	June 11, 2005	Kitt Peak	Spacewatch	L4	11 km	MPC · JPL
430852	2005 MX_{15}	—	June 24, 2005	Palomar	NEAT	·	3.1 km	MPC · JPL
430853	2005 MZ_{23}	—	June 27, 2005	Anderson Mesa	LONEOS	T_{j} (2.98)	4.2 km	MPC · JPL
430854	2005 MP_{26}	—	June 28, 2005	Kitt Peak	Spacewatch	·	1.3 km	MPC · JPL
430855	2005 MR_{50}	—	June 30, 2005	Kitt Peak	Spacewatch	·	3.1 km	MPC · JPL
430856	2005 MF_{54}	—	June 28, 2005	Palomar	NEAT	·	3.5 km	MPC · JPL
430857	2005 NG_{15}	—	July 2, 2005	Kitt Peak	Spacewatch	·	3.2 km	MPC · JPL
430858	2005 NZ_{22}	—	June 6, 2005	Kitt Peak	Spacewatch	·	850 m	MPC · JPL
430859	2005 NR_{30}	—	July 4, 2005	Kitt Peak	Spacewatch	·	4.7 km	MPC · JPL
430860	2005 NY_{44}	—	July 9, 2005	Catalina	CSS	T_{j} (2.89)	5.0 km	MPC · JPL
430861	2005 NS_{56}	—	July 5, 2005	Kitt Peak	Spacewatch	·	690 m	MPC · JPL
430862	2005 NZ_{75}	—	July 10, 2005	Kitt Peak	Spacewatch	·	3.0 km	MPC · JPL
430863	2005 NJ_{123}	—	July 8, 2005	Kitt Peak	Spacewatch	·	1.2 km	MPC · JPL
430864	2005 OM_{14}	—	July 31, 2005	Siding Spring	SSS	PHO	1.3 km	MPC · JPL
430865	2005 PW_{2}	—	August 2, 2005	Socorro	LINEAR	NYS	1.2 km	MPC · JPL
430866	2005 PP_{9}	—	August 4, 2005	Palomar	NEAT	MAS	800 m	MPC · JPL
430867	2005 PB_{20}	—	August 6, 2005	Palomar	NEAT	·	3.0 km	MPC · JPL
430868	2005 PU_{23}	—	August 6, 2005	Palomar	NEAT	·	4.3 km	MPC · JPL
430869	2005 QP_{3}	—	August 24, 2005	Palomar	NEAT	ERI	1.4 km	MPC · JPL
430870	2005 QR_{13}	—	August 24, 2005	Palomar	NEAT	NYS	950 m	MPC · JPL
430871	2005 QJ_{21}	—	August 26, 2005	Anderson Mesa	LONEOS	NYS	1.1 km	MPC · JPL
430872	2005 QD_{22}	—	August 27, 2005	Kitt Peak	Spacewatch	·	1.4 km	MPC · JPL
430873	2005 QU_{45}	—	August 26, 2005	Palomar	NEAT	·	1.3 km	MPC · JPL
430874	2005 QE_{56}	—	August 28, 2005	Kitt Peak	Spacewatch	·	1.9 km	MPC · JPL
430875	2005 QS_{60}	—	August 26, 2005	Anderson Mesa	LONEOS	·	3.7 km	MPC · JPL
430876	2005 QF_{71}	—	August 29, 2005	Socorro	LINEAR	·	3.0 km	MPC · JPL
430877	2005 QE_{79}	—	August 26, 2005	Campo Imperatore	CINEOS	·	1.3 km	MPC · JPL
430878	2005 QL_{84}	—	August 30, 2005	Campo Imperatore	CINEOS	·	1.1 km	MPC · JPL
430879	2005 QN_{96}	—	August 27, 2005	Palomar	NEAT	NYS	910 m	MPC · JPL
430880	2005 QW_{98}	—	August 27, 2005	Palomar	NEAT	·	2.7 km	MPC · JPL
430881	2005 QE_{108}	—	August 27, 2005	Palomar	NEAT	NYS	1.1 km	MPC · JPL
430882	2005 QC_{114}	—	August 27, 2005	Palomar	NEAT	H	720 m	MPC · JPL
430883	2005 QO_{114}	—	August 27, 2005	Palomar	NEAT	MAS	840 m	MPC · JPL
430884	2005 QM_{141}	—	August 30, 2005	Campo Imperatore	CINEOS	·	4.5 km	MPC · JPL
430885	2005 QY_{141}	—	August 30, 2005	Socorro	LINEAR	·	940 m	MPC · JPL
430886	2005 QX_{148}	—	August 31, 2005	Campo Imperatore	CINEOS	H	550 m	MPC · JPL
430887	2005 QE_{149}	—	August 26, 2005	Palomar	NEAT	·	2.3 km	MPC · JPL
430888	2005 QD_{180}	—	August 27, 2005	Anderson Mesa	LONEOS	·	1.0 km	MPC · JPL
430889	2005 QH_{180}	—	August 27, 2005	Palomar	NEAT	·	1.4 km	MPC · JPL
430890	2005 QN_{180}	—	August 28, 2005	Anderson Mesa	LONEOS	·	1.8 km	MPC · JPL
430891	2005 QK_{188}	—	August 31, 2005	Palomar	NEAT	·	1.1 km	MPC · JPL
430892	2005 QT_{188}	—	August 29, 2005	Kitt Peak	Spacewatch	·	3.2 km	MPC · JPL
430893	2005 RZ_{20}	—	September 1, 2005	Campo Imperatore	CINEOS	V	820 m	MPC · JPL
430894	2005 RF_{40}	—	September 5, 2005	Catalina	CSS	ERI	1.7 km	MPC · JPL
430895	2005 RO_{44}	—	September 1, 2005	Campo Imperatore	CINEOS	·	2.0 km	MPC · JPL
430896	2005 SS_{3}	—	September 23, 2005	Kitt Peak	Spacewatch	ADE	1.8 km	MPC · JPL
430897	2005 SD_{16}	—	September 26, 2005	Kitt Peak	Spacewatch	CYB	3.5 km	MPC · JPL
430898	2005 SC_{17}	—	September 26, 2005	Kitt Peak	Spacewatch	·	3.1 km	MPC · JPL
430899	2005 SW_{25}	—	September 1, 2005	Kitt Peak	Spacewatch	H	640 m	MPC · JPL
430900	2005 SX_{29}	—	September 23, 2005	Kitt Peak	Spacewatch	·	1.1 km	MPC · JPL

== 430901–431000 ==
back to top

Designation			Discovery			Properties		Ref
Permanent	Provisional	Named after	Date	Site	Discoverer(s)	Category	Diam.	Ref
430901	2005 SQ_{46}	—	September 24, 2005	Kitt Peak	Spacewatch	·	1.3 km	MPC · JPL
430902	2005 SW_{49}	—	September 24, 2005	Kitt Peak	Spacewatch	fast	1.2 km	MPC · JPL
430903	2005 SR_{51}	—	September 24, 2005	Kitt Peak	Spacewatch	·	1.5 km	MPC · JPL
430904	2005 SA_{69}	—	September 27, 2005	Kitt Peak	Spacewatch	·	1.6 km	MPC · JPL
430905	2005 SQ_{87}	—	September 24, 2005	Kitt Peak	Spacewatch	NYS	980 m	MPC · JPL
430906	2005 SQ_{125}	—	September 29, 2005	Mount Lemmon	Mount Lemmon Survey	PHO	890 m	MPC · JPL
430907	2005 SF_{161}	—	September 27, 2005	Kitt Peak	Spacewatch	·	2.6 km	MPC · JPL
430908	2005 SS_{168}	—	September 29, 2005	Kitt Peak	Spacewatch	·	1.5 km	MPC · JPL
430909	2005 SM_{173}	—	September 29, 2005	Kitt Peak	Spacewatch	·	1.2 km	MPC · JPL
430910	2005 SY_{205}	—	September 30, 2005	Anderson Mesa	LONEOS	·	1.2 km	MPC · JPL
430911	2005 ST_{240}	—	September 30, 2005	Kitt Peak	Spacewatch	·	1.2 km	MPC · JPL
430912	2005 SU_{256}	—	September 22, 2005	Palomar	NEAT	·	940 m	MPC · JPL
430913	2005 SL_{259}	—	September 24, 2005	Anderson Mesa	LONEOS	·	1.3 km	MPC · JPL
430914	2005 SA_{271}	—	September 30, 2005	Anderson Mesa	LONEOS	·	1.3 km	MPC · JPL
430915	2005 SX_{278}	—	September 24, 2005	Kitt Peak	Spacewatch	CYB	3.2 km	MPC · JPL
430916	2005 SN_{290}	—	September 26, 2005	Kitt Peak	Spacewatch	V	650 m	MPC · JPL
430917	2005 TP_{14}	—	October 3, 2005	Catalina	CSS	·	1.5 km	MPC · JPL
430918	2005 TN_{16}	—	October 1, 2005	Kitt Peak	Spacewatch	·	1.2 km	MPC · JPL
430919	2005 TM_{32}	—	October 1, 2005	Kitt Peak	Spacewatch	·	3.6 km	MPC · JPL
430920	2005 TZ_{40}	—	October 2, 2005	Palomar	NEAT	·	4.8 km	MPC · JPL
430921	2005 TO_{54}	—	October 1, 2005	Catalina	CSS	·	1.3 km	MPC · JPL
430922	2005 TV_{58}	—	October 1, 2005	Mount Lemmon	Mount Lemmon Survey	·	1.0 km	MPC · JPL
430923	2005 TS_{59}	—	September 24, 2005	Kitt Peak	Spacewatch	CYB	4.5 km	MPC · JPL
430924	2005 TY_{63}	—	October 6, 2005	Catalina	CSS	(5)	1.0 km	MPC · JPL
430925	2005 TC_{99}	—	October 7, 2005	Catalina	CSS	·	1.6 km	MPC · JPL
430926	2005 TD_{113}	—	October 7, 2005	Kitt Peak	Spacewatch	·	870 m	MPC · JPL
430927	2005 TC_{134}	—	October 10, 2005	Kitt Peak	Spacewatch	·	800 m	MPC · JPL
430928	2005 TA_{163}	—	October 9, 2005	Kitt Peak	Spacewatch	NYS	1.0 km	MPC · JPL
430929	2005 TK_{190}	—	October 2, 2005	Mount Lemmon	Mount Lemmon Survey	·	1.1 km	MPC · JPL
430930	2005 TP_{194}	—	October 12, 2005	Kitt Peak	Spacewatch	·	1.3 km	MPC · JPL
430931	2005 UW_{39}	—	October 24, 2005	Kitt Peak	Spacewatch	·	1.5 km	MPC · JPL
430932	2005 UJ_{45}	—	October 22, 2005	Kitt Peak	Spacewatch	·	1.1 km	MPC · JPL
430933	2005 UR_{53}	—	October 1, 2005	Anderson Mesa	LONEOS	·	1.5 km	MPC · JPL
430934	2005 UC_{61}	—	October 25, 2005	Mount Lemmon	Mount Lemmon Survey	·	1.2 km	MPC · JPL
430935	2005 UJ_{85}	—	October 22, 2005	Kitt Peak	Spacewatch	·	880 m	MPC · JPL
430936	2005 UV_{92}	—	October 22, 2005	Kitt Peak	Spacewatch	(5)	1.1 km	MPC · JPL
430937	2005 UZ_{105}	—	October 22, 2005	Kitt Peak	Spacewatch	·	1.6 km	MPC · JPL
430938	2005 UM_{117}	—	October 24, 2005	Kitt Peak	Spacewatch	·	860 m	MPC · JPL
430939	2005 UA_{127}	—	October 24, 2005	Kitt Peak	Spacewatch	·	890 m	MPC · JPL
430940	2005 UE_{139}	—	October 25, 2005	Kitt Peak	Spacewatch	·	880 m	MPC · JPL
430941	2005 UT_{218}	—	October 25, 2005	Kitt Peak	Spacewatch	·	1.1 km	MPC · JPL
430942	2005 UD_{234}	—	October 25, 2005	Kitt Peak	Spacewatch	NYS	1.3 km	MPC · JPL
430943	2005 UP_{236}	—	October 25, 2005	Kitt Peak	Spacewatch	PHO	1.1 km	MPC · JPL
430944	2005 UG_{241}	—	October 25, 2005	Kitt Peak	Spacewatch	·	1.5 km	MPC · JPL
430945	2005 UZ_{243}	—	October 25, 2005	Kitt Peak	Spacewatch	·	1.5 km	MPC · JPL
430946	2005 UC_{249}	—	October 28, 2005	Mount Lemmon	Mount Lemmon Survey	·	1.0 km	MPC · JPL
430947	2005 UV_{296}	—	October 26, 2005	Kitt Peak	Spacewatch	·	910 m	MPC · JPL
430948	2005 UP_{309}	—	October 28, 2005	Kitt Peak	Spacewatch	RAF	830 m	MPC · JPL
430949	2005 UQ_{325}	—	September 29, 2005	Mount Lemmon	Mount Lemmon Survey	·	1.3 km	MPC · JPL
430950	2005 UM_{361}	—	April 20, 2004	Kitt Peak	Spacewatch	·	1.2 km	MPC · JPL
430951	2005 UZ_{361}	—	October 27, 2005	Kitt Peak	Spacewatch	V	620 m	MPC · JPL
430952	2005 UY_{394}	—	October 30, 2005	Kitt Peak	Spacewatch	·	1.1 km	MPC · JPL
430953	2005 UN_{482}	—	September 24, 2005	Kitt Peak	Spacewatch	ADE	1.6 km	MPC · JPL
430954	2005 UW_{513}	—	October 26, 2005	Kitt Peak	Spacewatch	CYB	3.3 km	MPC · JPL
430955	2005 UC_{514}	—	October 29, 2005	Kitt Peak	Spacewatch	3:2 · SHU	4.1 km	MPC · JPL
430956	2005 UB_{517}	—	October 25, 2005	Apache Point	A. C. Becker	EUN	880 m	MPC · JPL
430957	2005 UL_{517}	—	October 25, 2005	Apache Point	A. C. Becker	CYB	3.4 km	MPC · JPL
430958	2005 UC_{526}	—	October 29, 2005	Kitt Peak	Spacewatch	·	1.2 km	MPC · JPL
430959	2005 VH_{24}	—	November 1, 2005	Kitt Peak	Spacewatch	MAS	720 m	MPC · JPL
430960	2005 VH_{39}	—	November 4, 2005	Kitt Peak	Spacewatch	V	690 m	MPC · JPL
430961	2005 VT_{123}	—	November 3, 2005	Kitt Peak	Spacewatch	·	1.1 km	MPC · JPL
430962	2005 WX_{18}	—	November 22, 2005	Kitt Peak	Spacewatch	EUN	1.1 km	MPC · JPL
430963	2005 WN_{27}	—	November 21, 2005	Kitt Peak	Spacewatch	·	1 km	MPC · JPL
430964	2005 WY_{36}	—	November 22, 2005	Kitt Peak	Spacewatch	·	910 m	MPC · JPL
430965	2005 WX_{42}	—	November 21, 2005	Kitt Peak	Spacewatch	·	2.2 km	MPC · JPL
430966	2005 WW_{48}	—	November 25, 2005	Kitt Peak	Spacewatch	·	790 m	MPC · JPL
430967	2005 WA_{50}	—	November 25, 2005	Mount Lemmon	Mount Lemmon Survey	·	920 m	MPC · JPL
430968	2005 WD_{51}	—	November 25, 2005	Kitt Peak	Spacewatch	·	1.6 km	MPC · JPL
430969	2005 WT_{51}	—	November 25, 2005	Kitt Peak	Spacewatch	·	1.1 km	MPC · JPL
430970	2005 WD_{56}	—	November 21, 2005	Anderson Mesa	LONEOS	H	610 m	MPC · JPL
430971	2005 WL_{78}	—	November 25, 2005	Kitt Peak	Spacewatch	3:2 · SHU	3.9 km	MPC · JPL
430972	2005 WM_{79}	—	November 25, 2005	Kitt Peak	Spacewatch	·	920 m	MPC · JPL
430973	2005 WT_{91}	—	November 25, 2005	Catalina	CSS	·	800 m	MPC · JPL
430974	2005 WQ_{93}	—	November 25, 2005	Mount Lemmon	Mount Lemmon Survey	·	1.1 km	MPC · JPL
430975	2005 WX_{94}	—	November 26, 2005	Kitt Peak	Spacewatch	·	1.6 km	MPC · JPL
430976	2005 WA_{96}	—	November 26, 2005	Kitt Peak	Spacewatch	·	2.9 km	MPC · JPL
430977	2005 WL_{111}	—	November 30, 2005	Kitt Peak	Spacewatch	·	1.8 km	MPC · JPL
430978	2005 WP_{115}	—	November 29, 2005	Mount Lemmon	Mount Lemmon Survey	·	2.9 km	MPC · JPL
430979	2005 WN_{119}	—	November 28, 2005	Catalina	CSS	·	1.7 km	MPC · JPL
430980	2005 WL_{135}	—	November 25, 2005	Mount Lemmon	Mount Lemmon Survey	·	950 m	MPC · JPL
430981	2005 WU_{140}	—	November 26, 2005	Mount Lemmon	Mount Lemmon Survey	·	1.6 km	MPC · JPL
430982	2005 WV_{141}	—	November 29, 2005	Mount Lemmon	Mount Lemmon Survey	H	700 m	MPC · JPL
430983	2005 WA_{147}	—	November 25, 2005	Kitt Peak	Spacewatch	·	990 m	MPC · JPL
430984	2005 WY_{152}	—	November 29, 2005	Kitt Peak	Spacewatch	·	1.4 km	MPC · JPL
430985	2005 WW_{153}	—	November 29, 2005	Kitt Peak	Spacewatch	·	1.5 km	MPC · JPL
430986	2005 WS_{157}	—	November 25, 2005	Mount Lemmon	Mount Lemmon Survey	·	1.5 km	MPC · JPL
430987	2005 WP_{160}	—	November 28, 2005	Mount Lemmon	Mount Lemmon Survey	PHO	2.2 km	MPC · JPL
430988	2005 WV_{160}	—	November 28, 2005	Kitt Peak	Spacewatch	·	1.5 km	MPC · JPL
430989	2005 WX_{172}	—	November 30, 2005	Mount Lemmon	Mount Lemmon Survey	·	830 m	MPC · JPL
430990	2005 WC_{183}	—	November 28, 2005	Catalina	CSS	·	1.6 km	MPC · JPL
430991	2005 XO_{12}	—	December 1, 2005	Mount Lemmon	Mount Lemmon Survey	MAS	770 m	MPC · JPL
430992	2005 XS_{24}	—	December 2, 2005	Mount Lemmon	Mount Lemmon Survey	·	2.2 km	MPC · JPL
430993	2005 XO_{37}	—	December 4, 2005	Kitt Peak	Spacewatch	(5)	1.2 km	MPC · JPL
430994	2005 XG_{44}	—	December 2, 2005	Kitt Peak	Spacewatch	MAR	930 m	MPC · JPL
430995	2005 XV_{45}	—	December 2, 2005	Kitt Peak	Spacewatch	·	1.3 km	MPC · JPL
430996	2005 XP_{47}	—	December 2, 2005	Kitt Peak	Spacewatch	·	1.1 km	MPC · JPL
430997	2005 XR_{65}	—	December 5, 2005	Kitt Peak	Spacewatch	·	1.3 km	MPC · JPL
430998	2005 XA_{78}	—	December 10, 2005	Pla D'Arguines	D'Arguines, Pla	·	1.9 km	MPC · JPL
430999	2005 XL_{86}	—	December 7, 2005	Kitt Peak	Spacewatch	(5)	970 m	MPC · JPL
431000	2005 YT_{16}	—	December 22, 2005	Kitt Peak	Spacewatch	·	2.1 km	MPC · JPL

back to top
