= John Goodricke =

English astronomer (1764–1786)

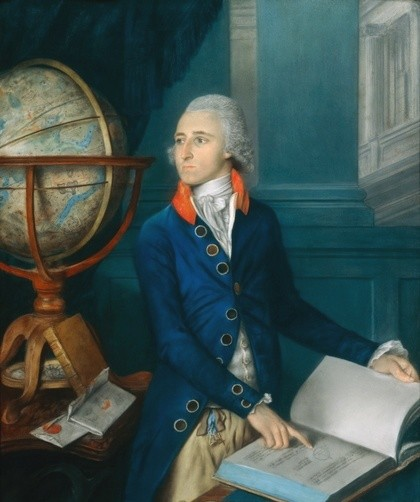
- Born: 17 September 1764; Groningen
- Died: 20 April 1786 (aged 21)
- Known for: Studies of variable stars
- Awards: Copley Medal (1783)
- Scientific career
- Fields: Astronomy

John Goodricke FRS (17 September 1764 – 20 April 1786) was an English amateur astronomer. He is best known for his observations of the variable star Algol (Beta Persei) in 1782.

== Life and work ==
John Goodricke, named after his great-grandfather Sir John Goodricke (see Goodricke baronets of Ribston Hall), was born in Groningen in the Netherlands, but lived most of his life in England. He became deaf in early childhood due to a severe illness. His parents sent him to Thomas Braidwood's Academy, a school for deaf pupils in Edinburgh, and in 1778 to the Warrington Academy.

After leaving Warrington, Goodricke returned to live with his parents in York. At some stage during this period he lived at 14 Lendal. There, he became friends with his neighbour Edward Pigott, whose father Nathaniel Pigott had built a sophisticated private observatory. Edward was already interested in variable stars and gave Goodricke a list of those that he thought were worthy of observation.

Goodricke is credited with discovering the periodic variation of β Lyrae and δ Cephei, the prototypical example of the Cepheid variable stars.

Although several stars were already known to vary in apparent magnitude, Goodricke was the first to propose a mechanism to account for this. He suggested that Algol is what is now known as an eclipsing binary. He presented his findings to the Royal Society in May 1783, and for this work, the Society awarded him the Copley Medal for that year. He was elected a Fellow of the Royal Society on 16 April 1786. He never learned of this honour however, as he died four days later from pneumonia. He never married.

== Goodricke in Yorkshire ==
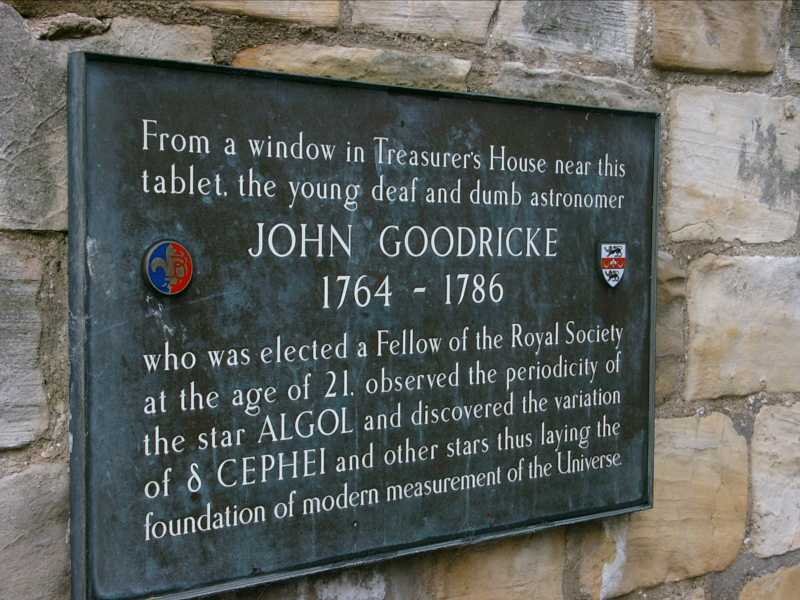
Marker for John Goodricke in York, England

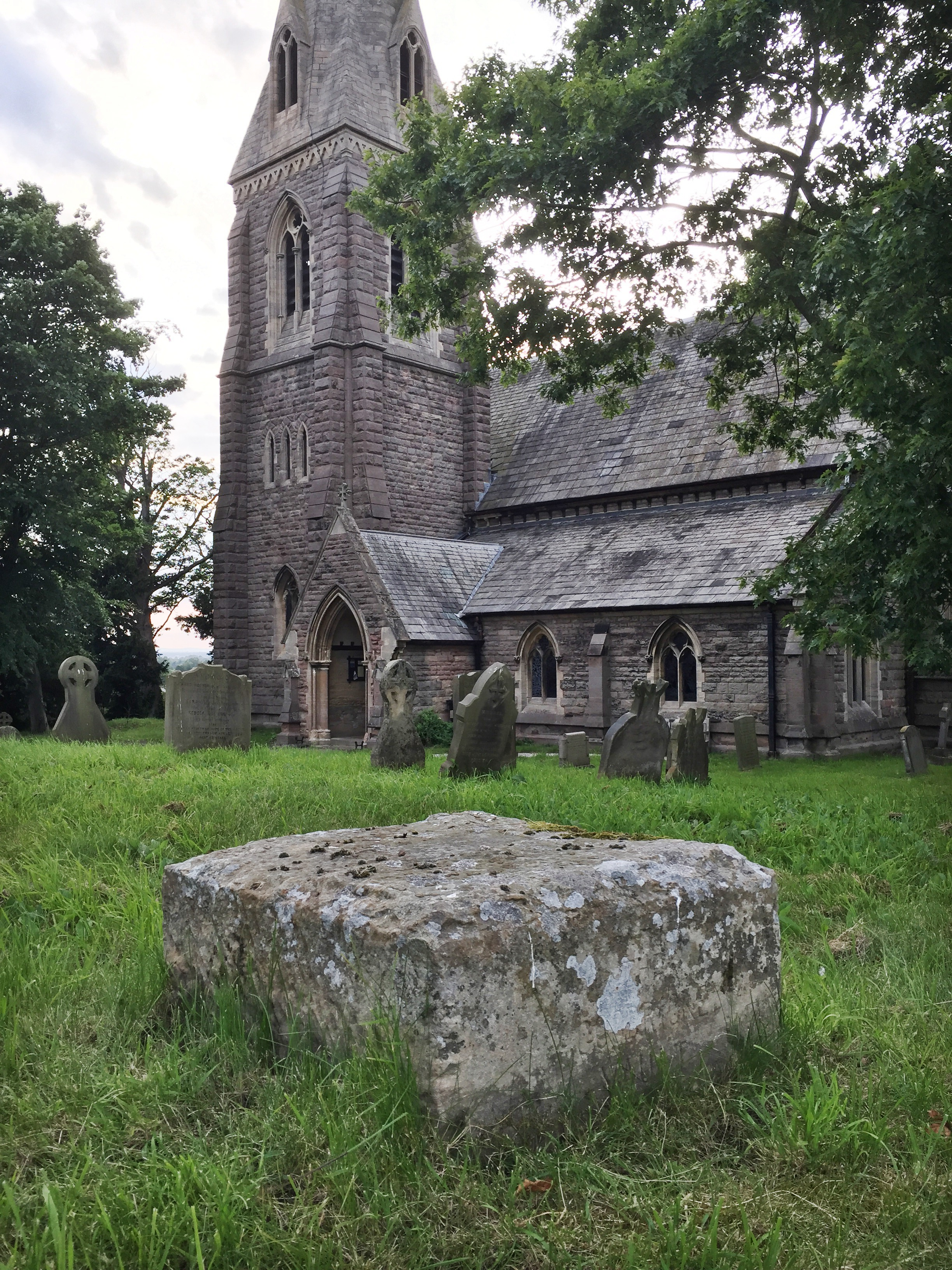
Goodricke family vault on the grounds of Hunsingore Church

Goodricke was buried at Hunsingore Church, then in West Yorkshire, along with many of his relatives.

Today there is a marker in York near the site of Goodricke's observatory.

In 1949, Sidney Melmore showed that Goodricke worked from the Treasurer's House (now owned by the National Trust) very near York Minster, and concluded that he had observed from the north window of the top floor of the south-east wing, looking south towards the Minster. However, records indicate that the Goodricke family had rented rooms from Edward Topham, the then owner of the northwest wing of the house.

Goodricke College at the University of York is named after Goodricke. There is also a modern sculpture named Algol in the grounds.

== Honours ==
Asteroid 3116 Goodricke is named for John Goodricke.

The University of York has a Goodricke College named after John Goodricke.

The Goodricke-Pigott Observatory is a private astronomical observatory in Tucson, Arizona, named after both Goodricke and Pigott. It was formally dedicated on 26 October 1996.
