= Edward Pigott =

English astronomer

- Born: 1753
- Died: 1825 (aged 71–72)
- Scientific career
- Fields: Astronomy

Edward Pigott (1753–1825) was an English astronomer notable for being one of the founders of the study of variable stars. He is also notable for discovery the galaxy Messier 64, on April 4, 1779.

== Biography ==
Son of the astronomer Nathaniel Pigott, Pigott's work focused on variable stars. Educated in France with a mother from Louvain, the family moved to York in 1781. Despite their significant age difference, he was a friend and collaborator of John Goodricke (his distant cousin) until the latter's untimely death at the age of 21 in 1786.

In 1784, Pigott informed the Royal Society of his discovery of a new variable star. This was Eta Aquilae which he had identified the previous year. He corresponded with leading astronomers of the day including William Herschel and Nevil Maskelyne.

Pigott moved to Bath in 1796. Pigott's notebooks survive at York City Archives.

== Honors ==
Asteroid 10220 Pigott is named after Edward and his father. It was discovered by R. A. Tucker at the observatory in Tucson, Arizona which bears Pigott's name and that of his friend Goodricke.
