= Goodricke-Pigott Observatory =

Astronomical observatory

- Named after: John Goodricke, Edward Pigott
- Observatory code: 683
- Location: Tucson, Arizona, United States
- Coordinates: 32°09′20″N 111°04′58″W
- Altitude: 747 m (2,451 ft)
- Established: 26 October 1996
- Website: gpobs.home.mindspring.com/gpobs.htm
- Location of Goodricke-Pigott Observatory

The Goodricke-Pigott Observatory is a private astronomical observatory in Tucson, Arizona. It was formally dedicated on October 26, 1996, and observations began that evening with imaging of Comet Hale–Bopp.

The observatory is named after John Goodricke and Edward Pigott, two late-eighteenth century astronomers who lived in York, England.

== Observatory telescopes ==
The observatory opened with a Celestron C14, 0.35-meter aperture, f/11 Schmidt-Cassegrain telescope. This instrument has been upgraded with a new optics lens and a new clock drive, and an ST-4 star tracker was attached to the telescope's side to correct a two-minute, ten-arc second periodic motional error. There is another telescope dubbed MOTESS (Moving Object and Transient Event Search System) which is essentially a giant camera aimed at the sky.

== See also ==
- List of astronomical observatories
- Roy A. Tucker
