= Nathaniel Pigott =

English astronomer

- Born: 1725; Whitton, Middlesex, England
- Died: 30 May 1804 (aged 78–79)
- Known for: Observations of eclipses, transits of Venus and Mercury, and comets
- Children: Edward Pigott
- Awards: Fellow of the Royal Society (1772)
- Scientific career
- Fields: Astronomy

Nathaniel Pigott (1725–1804) was an English astronomer, noted for his observations of eclipses, a transit of Venus and a transit of Mercury, and comets. He became a Fellow of the Royal Society on 16 January 1772, a foreign member of the Imperial Academy at Brussels in 1773, and a correspondent of the French Academy of Sciences in 1776.

== Life and career ==
Born in Whitton, Middlesex, Pigott was the son of Ralph Pigott of Whitton by his wife Alethea, daughter of the eighth Viscount Fairfax. He was the grandson of barrister Nathaniel Pigott (1661–1737), a Roman Catholic and intimate friend of poet Alexander Pope, who eulogised him in an epitaph inscribed in the parish church of Twickenham. The younger Nathaniel Pigott married Anna Mathurina, daughter of Monsieur de Bériol, and spent some years at Caen in Normandy for the education of his children. He and his family led a somewhat vagrant life in various parts of Britain and the Continent, where conditions were more congenial for the staunchly Catholic family.

It is not known when Pigott first became interested in astronomy. However, he was able to purchase fine instruments from London craftsmen and became known for observational ability and computational accuracy. The Academy of Sciences of Caen chose him a foreign member about 1764, and he observed there, with John Dollond's six-foot achromatic telescope, the partial solar eclipse of 16 August 1765. His observations of the transit of Venus on 3 June 1769 were transmitted to the French Academy of Sciences; his meteorological record at Caen, from 1765 to 1769, to the Royal Society, of which body he was elected a fellow on 16 January 1772. He maintained a friendly relationship with astronomer William Herschel.

In Brussels in 1772, he undertook, at the request of the government, to determine the geographical positions of the principal towns of the Low Countries. The work occupied five months and was carried out at his own expense, with the assistance of his son Edward Pigott and of his servants. The longitudes were obtained from observations of the eclipses of Jupiter's satellites, the latitudes by means of meridian altitudes taken with a Bird's quadrant lent by the Royal Society. Pigott described these operations in a letter to Nevil Maskelyne, dated Louvain, 11 August 1775, and their results were printed at large in the Memoirs of the Brussels Academy of Sciences. He was chosen a foreign member of the Brussels Academy on 25 May 1773, and a correspondent of the French Academy of Sciences on 12 June 1776. Pigott also participated in an unusual experiment on 1 November 1773, to ascertain variances in barometric pressure created by the ringing of the 16,000-pound bell of the cathedral of Ste. Goedule in Brussels.

Pigott spent part of the summer of 1777 at Lady Widdrington's house in Gloucestershire, of which he determined the longitude, and then took up his residence at Frampton House, Glamorganshire, on his own estate. Here he fitted up an observatory with a transit by Sisson, a six-foot achromatic by Dollond, and several smaller telescopes. He ascertained its latitude, and in 1778–9 discovered some double stars. He and his son Edward also investigated and corrected the mapping of many localities in the area. In 1783 he sent to the Royal Society an account of a remarkable meteor seen by him while riding across Hewit (Heworth) Common, near York. He observed at the Collège Royal, Louvain, a few days after his arrival from England, the transit of Mercury of 3 May 1786.

Pigott died abroad in 1804. His son Edward, who assisted in many of his observations, became a noted astronomer in his own right. His second son, Charles Gregory Pigott, assumed the name Fairfax on succeeding his cousin, Anne Fairfax, in 1793, in the possession of Gilling Castle, Yorkshire; he married in 1794 Mary, sister of Sir Henry Goodricke, and died in 1845. The possession of Gilling Castle had been the subject of a lengthy family dispute.

== Publications ==
- 1782 (with Dr William White): "Observations on the Bills of Mortality at York. By William White, MDFAS; Communicated by Nathaniel Pigott, Esq. FRS" Philosophical Transactions of the Royal Society of London
