= Elbrus (disambiguation) =

Mount Elbrus is the highest mountain in Russia and Europe.

Elbrus may also refer to:

- Elbrus (given name)
- Elbrus (computer), line of Soviet and Russian computer systems
- Russian microprocessors:
  - Elbrus 2000
  - Elbrus-2S+
  - Elbrus-8S
- Elbrus-Avia, Russian airline
- FC Elbrus Nalchik
- FIN7, Russian advanced persistent threat also known as ELBRUS
- R-17 Elbrus, Soviet-designed tactical ballistic missile
- R-300 Elbrus, Soviet missile
- 160013 Elbrus, asteroid

== See also ==
- Alborz (disambiguation)
