= Sevinj Nurugizi =

Azerbaijani writer (born 1964)

Sevinj Nurugiz
- Born: August 22, 1964 (age 61) Baku, Azerbaijan, then part of the Soviet Union
- Occupation: Author

Sevinj Nurugizi (Azerbaijani: Sevinc Nuruqızı; born August 22, 1964) is an Azerbaijani children's writer. Some of her work has been translated into English and Russian. She has been a member of the Union of Azerbaijani Writers since 2001 and a member of the Azerbaijan Journalists Union since 1999.

== Biography ==
In 1981, Nurugizi enrolled at the M.F. Akhundov Institute of Russian Language and Literature, graduating in 1986. She began her career as a teacher of Russian language and literature at a secondary school in the Şelli-Garadaghly village of Aghdam District.

In March 2003, Nurugizi became deputy editor-in-chief of Madaniyyat, a newspaper under the Azerbaijani Ministry of Culture.

From January 2006, she served as creative director for the children's magazines Jirtdan and Umid at the Minamedia publishing house. She was also the editor and presenter of the children's program Chokhbilmish on İctimai Radio.

In 2007, she became the editor-in-chief and head of the children's literature department at the Tahsil and Aspoligraf publishing houses.

== Awards ==
- 2002: Awarded the Tofig Mahmoud Prize by the Writers' Union of Azerbaijan for contributions to children's literature.
- 2014: First Azerbaijani nominee for the Hans Christian Andersen Award and the Gold Medal of the International Children's Books Council.
- 2015: Won first place in the 'Canakkale-100' poetry competition for Canakkale Impassable, organized by the Turkish Embassy in Azerbaijan and the Azerbaijani Writers' Union.
- 2015: Won the 'Golden Word' literary competition held by the Ministry of Culture and Tourism of Azerbaijan for her book Travel to Ancient Baku.
- 2015: Travel to Ancient Baku won first place at the International Book Art Contest in Moscow
- 2017: Her poem For Khojaly was recognized in the 'Khojaly Literary Prize' competition organized by the Azerbaijan-European Organization (TEAS) in the United Kingdom.

== Works ==
- "The Kite". Baku: Adiloghlu, 2002. 108 pages.
- "Yellow Girl, Dizz and Vizz". Baku: Oscar, 2003. 26 pages.
- "Story of the White Cock". Baku: CBS, 2005. 12 pages.
- "Revenge". Baku: Vektor, 2005. 132 pages.
- "Two days with Jiya". Baku: Oscar, 2007. 32 pages.
- "Adventures of Ipekche". Baku: Oscar, 2007. 28 pages.
- "Fairytale of the unusual village". Baku: Tahsil, 2009. (Azerbaijani and Russian)
- "Bozgulag and the seasons". Baku: Tahsil, 2009. (Azerbaijani and Russian)
- "Hide and seek in the wardrobe". Baku: Tahsil, 2009. (Azerbaijani and Russian)
- "Murad's dream". Baku: Tahsil, 2009.
- "Find the riddle". Baku: Tahsil, 2009.
- "Aghja and Jubbulu". Baku: Tahsil, 2009. (Azerbaijani and Russian)
- "Aysu and the Moon". Baku: Tahsil, 2009. (Azerbaijani and Russian)
- "Mountain with a trunk". Baku: Tahsil, 2010. 24 pages.
- "The small alphabet". Baku: Aspoligraf, 2010. 196 pages.
- "Dede Gorgud". Baku: Aspoligraf, 2010. 67 pages. (Azerbaijani and Russian)
- "Babek". Baku: Aspoligraf, 2010. 16 pages.
- "Shah Ismayil Khatai". Baku: Aspoligraf, 2010. 12 pages.
- "Aghabeyim Agha". Baku: Aspoligraf, 2010. 16 pages.
- "Little Sparrow". One-act children's opera. With Ogtay Rajabov. Mutarjim, 2011.
- "Bozgulag and the seasons". Minsk: Zvezda, 2014. 16 pages. (Russian translation by Alesya Kerlyukevich and Ragenda Malakhoyski)
- "Traveling to Ancient Baku". Baku: Education, 2015. 164 pages. (Azerbaijani and English)
- "Musical, mathematical math". With Oktay Rajabov. Education, 2017. 60 pages.
- "Let's learn the letter A". Baku: Tahsil, 2017. 8 pages.
- "Let's learn the letter B". Baku: Tahsil, 2017. 8 pages.
- "Let's learn the letter C". Baku: Tahsil, 2017. 8 pages.
- "Let's learn the letter Ç". Baku: Tahsil, 2017. 8 pages.

=== Translations ===
- "Fairytales". Baku: Tahsil, 2009. 36 pages.
- "Three Tengus and a Badger". Baku: Aspoligraf, 2010. 16 pages.
- "Issumbosi". Baku: Aspoligraf, 2010. 16 pages.
- "What a fairytale, fairytale. Part 1". Baku: Aspoligraf, 2012. 88 pages.
- "What a fairytale, fairytale. Part 2". Baku: Aspoligraf, 2012. 88 pages.
- "Gift from the Sun". Baku: Aspoligraf, 2013. 88 pages.
- "Order of the yellow woodpecker". Baku: Aspoligraf, 2013. 88 pages.
- Ales Karlyukevich. "The squirrel writes composition". Baku: Aspoligraf, 2013. 88 pages.

=== Textbooks ===
- Heyat bilgisi (Life skills): evaluation tests. 1st form. Baku: Aspoligraf, 2011. 48 pages.
- Heyat bilgisi (Life skills): summative evaluation tests. 2nd form. Baku: Aspoligraf, 2010.
- Heyat bilgisi (Life skills): summative evaluation tests. 3rd form. Baku: Aspoligraf, 2010.
- Heyat bilgisi (Life skills): summative evaluation tests. 4th form. Baku: Aspoligraf, 2010.
- "Music". Textbook for grades 1–4. Edited by Sevinj Nurugizi.
- "Music". Methodical textbook for teachers, grades 1–7. Edited by Sevinj Nurugizi.
- "Technology". Textbook for grades 1–4. Edited by Sevinj Nurugizi.
- "Technology". Methodical textbook for teachers, grades 1–7. Edited by Sevinj Nurugizi.
