= Elbrus (given name) =

Elbrus (Russian: Эльбрус) is a male given name, after Mount Elbrus.

Notable people with the name include:

- Elbrus Abbasov (1950–2020), Azerbaijani footballer
- Elbrus Allahverdiyev (1958–1993), Azerbaijani soldier
- Elbrus Isakov (born 1981), Azerbaijani alpine skier
- Elbrus Tandelov (born 1982), Russian footballer
- Elbrus Tedeyev (born 1974), Ukrainian wrestler
- Elbrus Zurayev (born 1982), Russian footballer
