= Meanings of minor-planet names: 160001–161000 =

As minor planet discoveries are confirmed, they are given a permanent number by the IAU's Minor Planet Center (MPC), and the discoverers can then submit names for them, following the IAU's naming conventions. The list below concerns those minor planets in the specified number-range that have received names, and explains the meanings of those names.

Official naming citations of newly named small Solar System bodies are approved and published in a bulletin by IAU's Working Group for Small Bodies Nomenclature (WGSBN). Before May 2021, citations were published in MPC's Minor Planet Circulars for many decades. Recent citations can also be found on the JPL Small-Body Database (SBDB). Until his death in 2016, German astronomer Lutz D. Schmadel compiled these citations into the Dictionary of Minor Planet Names (DMP) and regularly updated the collection.

Based on Paul Herget's The Names of the Minor Planets, Schmadel also researched the unclear origin of numerous asteroids, most of which had been named prior to World War II. This article incorporates text from this source, which is in the public domain: SBDB New namings may only be added to this list below after official publication as the preannouncement of names is condemned. The WGSBN publishes a comprehensive guideline for the naming rules of non-cometary small Solar System bodies.

== 160001–160100 ==
Named minor planet	Provisional	This minor planet was named for...	Ref · Catalog
160001 Bakonybél	2006 GU_{31}	The ancient village of Bakonybél (founded in 1018) is located in the heart of the High Bakony Landscape Protection Area	JPL · 160001
160013 Elbrus	1294 T-2	Mount Elbrus, the highest mountain of the Caucasus in Russia	JPL · 160013

== 160101–160200 ==
back to top

Named minor planet	Provisional	This minor planet was named for...	Ref · Catalog
160105 Gobi	2000 SK_{43}	The Gobi Desert, a large region in Asia, covering parts of southern Mongolia and northwestern China, historically known for being part of the Mongol Empire, and for the location of several important cities along the Silk Road.	JPL · 160105

== 160201–160300 ==
back to top

Named minor planet	Provisional	This minor planet was named for...	Ref · Catalog
160215 Haines-Stiles	2002 CB_{274}	Geoffrey Haines-Stiles (born 1948) served as the Public Outreach Cinematographer for the New Horizons mission to Pluto.	JPL · 160215
160259 Mareike	2002 QH_{53}	Mareike Hönig (born 1981), German mathematician and wife of the discoverer Sebastian F. Hönig	JPL · 160259

== 160301–160400 ==
back to top

Named minor planet	Provisional	This minor planet was named for...	Ref · Catalog
There are no named minor planets in this number range

== 160401–160500 ==
back to top

Named minor planet	Provisional	This minor planet was named for...	Ref · Catalog
160493 Nantou	2007 CD_{13}	Nantou County is located at the geographical center of Taiwan	JPL · 160493

== 160501–160600 ==
back to top

Named minor planet	Provisional	This minor planet was named for...	Ref · Catalog
160512 Franck-Hertz	1990 TE_{11}	James Franck (1882–1964) and Gustav Hertz (1887–1975) received the Nobel Prize for Physics in 1925	JPL · 160512
160556 Greenaugh	1998 RR_{4}	Kevin Greenaugh (1956–2023), an American nuclear engineer.	IAU · 160556
160575 Manuelblasco	1999 GQ_{6}	Manuel Blasco Martín (born 1962), Mallorcan astronomer who discovered several minor planets from the Observatorio Astronómico de Mallorca.	IAU · 160575

== 160601–160700 ==
back to top

Named minor planet	Provisional	This minor planet was named for...	Ref · Catalog
There are no named minor planets in this number range

== 160701–160800 ==
back to top

Named minor planet	Provisional	This minor planet was named for...	Ref · Catalog
There are no named minor planets in this number range

== 160801–160900 ==
back to top

Named minor planet	Provisional	This minor planet was named for...	Ref · Catalog
There are no named minor planets in this number range

== 160901–161000 ==
back to top

Named minor planet	Provisional	This minor planet was named for...	Ref · Catalog
160903 Shiokaze	2001 TO_{56}	The Japan Railway's express train Shiokaze was inaugurated in 1972, connecting Uwajima with Takamatsu, Japan	JPL · 160903

back to top

Preceded by 159,001–160,000	Meanings of minor-planet names List of minor planets: 160,001–161,000	Succeeded by 161,001–162,000
