= Elbrus Allahverdiyev =

Azerbaijani soldier

- Born: 27 September 1958; Ganja, Azerbaijan SSR, USSR
- Died: 16 June 1993 (aged 34); Şelli, Agdam Azerbaijan Republic
- Military career
- Service years: 1992–1993
- Conflicts: First Nagorno-Karabakh War
- Awards: National Hero of Azerbaijan; 1994

Elbrus Allahverdiyev (Azerbaijani: Elbrus Allahverdiyev) (27 September 1958, Ganja, Azerbaijan SSR – 6 June 1993, Şelli Agdam, Azerbaijan Republic) — was the military serviceman of Azerbaijan Armed Forces, warrior during the First Nagorno-Karabakh War and National Hero of Azerbaijan.

== Early life and education ==
Allahverdiyev was born in worker family on 27 September 1958 in Ganja, Azerbaijan SSR. In 1976, he completed his secondary education in Ganja. He had served in the Soviet Army during 1976–1978. In 1990, he graduated from Sergo Ordzhonikidze Agriculture Institute.

He had lived in Vladikavkaz for few years.

== Family ==
He was married. He had three children.

== First Nagorno-Karabakh war ==
He came back to Azerbaijan after the First Nagorno-Karabakh War began and joined Azerbaijan Armed Forces. He was one of the founders of the Azerbaijani artillery. He fought against Armenians in Aghdara and Aghdam. Many times, he had prevented Armenians artillery attack. When the Armenians attacked to Aghdam on June 12, 1993, Elbrus Allahverdiyev destroyed many of the enemy's forces and forced them to retreat.

On 16 June 1993, he had got injured in one of the battles around Agdam District.

== Honors ==
Elbrus Haji oglu Allahverdiyev was posthumously awarded the title of the "National Hero of Azerbaijan" by Presidential Decree No. 202 dated 16 September 1994.

He was buried at the Ganja Martyrs' Lane.

== See also ==
- First Nagorno-Karabakh War
- List of National Heroes of Azerbaijan
