= List of minor planets: 160001–161000 =

The following is a partial list of minor planets, running from minor-planet number 160001 through 161000, inclusive. The primary data for this and other partial lists is based on JPL's "Small-Body Orbital Elements" and data available from the Minor Planet Center. Critical list information is also provided by the MPC, unless otherwise specified from Lowell Observatory. A detailed description of the table's columns and additional sources are given on the main page including a complete list of every page in this series, and a statistical break-up on the dynamical classification of minor planets.

Also see the summary list of all named bodies in numerical and alphabetical order, and the corresponding naming citations for the number range of this particular list. New namings may only be added to this list after official publication, as the preannouncement of names is condemned by the Working Group for Small Bodies Nomenclature of the International Astronomical Union.

Near-Earth obj.	MBA (inner)	MBA (outer)	Centaur
Mars-crosser	MBA (middle)	Jupiter trojan	Trans-Neptunian obj.
Unclassified

== 160001–160100 ==
Designation			Discovery			Properties		Ref
Permanent	Provisional	Named after	Date	Site	Discoverer(s)	Category	Diam.	Ref
160001 Bakonybél	2006 GU_{31}	Bakonybél	April 5, 2006	Piszkéstető	K. Sárneczky	·	5.1 km	MPC · JPL
160002	2006 JO_{57}	—	May 7, 2006	Kitt Peak	Spacewatch	·	4.3 km	MPC · JPL
160003	2006 SL_{284}	—	September 27, 2006	Socorro	LINEAR	·	1.3 km	MPC · JPL
160004	2007 GP_{24}	—	April 11, 2007	Kitt Peak	Spacewatch	·	1.6 km	MPC · JPL
160005	2007 GA_{51}	—	April 15, 2007	Catalina	CSS	T_{j} (2.99) · 3:2	10 km	MPC · JPL
160006	2007 HK_{56}	—	April 22, 2007	Kitt Peak	Spacewatch	·	1.3 km	MPC · JPL
160007	2007 HY_{60}	—	April 20, 2007	Socorro	LINEAR	HYG	5.1 km	MPC · JPL
160008	2007 JJ	—	May 7, 2007	Mount Lemmon	Mount Lemmon Survey	·	5.6 km	MPC · JPL
160009	2007 JM_{3}	—	May 6, 2007	Kitt Peak	Spacewatch	·	2.6 km	MPC · JPL
160010	6699 P-L	—	September 24, 1960	Palomar	C. J. van Houten, I. van Houten-Groeneveld, T. Gehrels	·	2.0 km	MPC · JPL
160011	1098 T-2	—	September 29, 1973	Palomar	C. J. van Houten, I. van Houten-Groeneveld, T. Gehrels	·	2.8 km	MPC · JPL
160012	1110 T-2	—	September 29, 1973	Palomar	C. J. van Houten, I. van Houten-Groeneveld, T. Gehrels	·	860 m	MPC · JPL
160013 Elbrus	1294 T-2	Elbrus	September 29, 1973	Palomar	C. J. van Houten, I. van Houten-Groeneveld, T. Gehrels	·	3.3 km	MPC · JPL
160014	3057 T-2	—	September 30, 1973	Palomar	C. J. van Houten, I. van Houten-Groeneveld, T. Gehrels	·	2.4 km	MPC · JPL
160015	3079 T-2	—	September 30, 1973	Palomar	C. J. van Houten, I. van Houten-Groeneveld, T. Gehrels	·	1.6 km	MPC · JPL
160016	1988 SX_{1}	—	September 16, 1988	Cerro Tololo	S. J. Bus	·	2.1 km	MPC · JPL
160017	1990 JD_{2}	—	May 1, 1990	Siding Spring	Lowe, A.	·	3.5 km	MPC · JPL
160018	1991 TY_{2}	—	October 7, 1991	Tautenburg Observatory	F. Börngen, L. D. Schmadel	·	3.8 km	MPC · JPL
160019	1994 FE	—	March 19, 1994	Siding Spring	R. H. McNaught	(194)	2.8 km	MPC · JPL
160020	1995 FN_{4}	—	March 23, 1995	Kitt Peak	Spacewatch	·	1.3 km	MPC · JPL
160021	1995 FE_{7}	—	March 24, 1995	Kitt Peak	Spacewatch	AEO	2.9 km	MPC · JPL
160022	1995 YL_{11}	—	December 18, 1995	Kitt Peak	Spacewatch	·	2.7 km	MPC · JPL
160023	1996 VM_{19}	—	November 7, 1996	Kitt Peak	Spacewatch	·	2.6 km	MPC · JPL
160024	1996 VG_{25}	—	November 10, 1996	Kitt Peak	Spacewatch	HOF	3.4 km	MPC · JPL
160025	1996 XS	—	December 1, 1996	Chichibu	N. Satō	·	3.0 km	MPC · JPL
160026	1997 EH_{25}	—	March 7, 1997	Kitt Peak	Spacewatch	·	830 m	MPC · JPL
160027	1997 UN_{1}	—	October 23, 1997	Kleť	M. Tichý, Z. Moravec	·	1.1 km	MPC · JPL
160028	1998 ET_{5}	—	March 2, 1998	Kitt Peak	Spacewatch	·	1.5 km	MPC · JPL
160029	1998 FM_{101}	—	March 31, 1998	Socorro	LINEAR	·	3.2 km	MPC · JPL
160030	1998 FM_{130}	—	March 22, 1998	Socorro	LINEAR	MAR	2.2 km	MPC · JPL
160031	1998 HD_{48}	—	April 20, 1998	Socorro	LINEAR	·	2.4 km	MPC · JPL
160032	1998 HM_{96}	—	April 21, 1998	Socorro	LINEAR	·	2.1 km	MPC · JPL
160033	1998 QU_{81}	—	August 24, 1998	Socorro	LINEAR	·	7.2 km	MPC · JPL
160034	1998 RS_{39}	—	September 14, 1998	Socorro	LINEAR	·	3.4 km	MPC · JPL
160035	1998 WQ_{27}	—	November 18, 1998	Kitt Peak	Spacewatch	NYS · fast	1.3 km	MPC · JPL
160036	1998 XH_{7}	—	December 8, 1998	Kitt Peak	Spacewatch	NYS	1.7 km	MPC · JPL
160037	1998 YG_{6}	—	December 22, 1998	Catalina	CSS	T_{j} (2.99) · EUP	7.1 km	MPC · JPL
160038	1999 CL_{56}	—	February 10, 1999	Socorro	LINEAR	·	1.9 km	MPC · JPL
160039	1999 JE_{4}	—	May 10, 1999	Socorro	LINEAR	PHO	2.2 km	MPC · JPL
160040	1999 NC_{30}	—	July 14, 1999	Socorro	LINEAR	·	3.4 km	MPC · JPL
160041	1999 NJ_{36}	—	July 14, 1999	Socorro	LINEAR	·	2.1 km	MPC · JPL
160042	1999 NW_{64}	—	July 14, 1999	Socorro	LINEAR	·	2.9 km	MPC · JPL
160043	1999 OC_{2}	—	July 22, 1999	Socorro	LINEAR	·	5.1 km	MPC · JPL
160044	1999 RJ_{37}	—	September 10, 1999	Socorro	LINEAR	·	2.4 km	MPC · JPL
160045	1999 RU_{183}	—	September 9, 1999	Socorro	LINEAR	·	2.2 km	MPC · JPL
160046	1999 SG_{23}	—	September 30, 1999	Socorro	LINEAR	MAR	2.0 km	MPC · JPL
160047	1999 TF_{181}	—	October 11, 1999	Socorro	LINEAR	(5)	2.1 km	MPC · JPL
160048	1999 TF_{185}	—	October 12, 1999	Socorro	LINEAR	·	4.2 km	MPC · JPL
160049	1999 TF_{189}	—	October 12, 1999	Socorro	LINEAR	·	3.9 km	MPC · JPL
160050	1999 TW_{242}	—	October 4, 1999	Catalina	CSS	(5)	1.9 km	MPC · JPL
160051	1999 TB_{260}	—	October 9, 1999	Socorro	LINEAR	·	2.9 km	MPC · JPL
160052	1999 TQ_{265}	—	October 3, 1999	Socorro	LINEAR	EUN	2.3 km	MPC · JPL
160053	1999 TD_{284}	—	October 9, 1999	Socorro	LINEAR	(5)	2.2 km	MPC · JPL
160054	1999 TZ_{290}	—	October 10, 1999	Socorro	LINEAR	·	2.4 km	MPC · JPL
160055	1999 UQ_{44}	—	October 30, 1999	Anderson Mesa	LONEOS	·	2.8 km	MPC · JPL
160056	1999 UF_{52}	—	October 31, 1999	Catalina	CSS	·	3.7 km	MPC · JPL
160057	1999 UZ_{60}	—	October 18, 1999	Socorro	LINEAR	·	4.0 km	MPC · JPL
160058	1999 VV_{36}	—	November 3, 1999	Socorro	LINEAR	·	2.8 km	MPC · JPL
160059	1999 VV_{88}	—	November 4, 1999	Socorro	LINEAR	·	2.7 km	MPC · JPL
160060	1999 VV_{113}	—	November 4, 1999	Catalina	CSS	·	3.9 km	MPC · JPL
160061	1999 VG_{127}	—	November 9, 1999	Kitt Peak	Spacewatch	·	3.2 km	MPC · JPL
160062	1999 VQ_{143}	—	November 11, 1999	Catalina	CSS	·	1.9 km	MPC · JPL
160063	1999 VV_{204}	—	November 10, 1999	Kitt Peak	Spacewatch	THM	2.4 km	MPC · JPL
160064	1999 XG_{114}	—	December 11, 1999	Socorro	LINEAR	EUN	2.6 km	MPC · JPL
160065	1999 XX_{117}	—	December 5, 1999	Catalina	CSS	·	2.5 km	MPC · JPL
160066	1999 XS_{236}	—	December 5, 1999	Anderson Mesa	LONEOS	·	3.3 km	MPC · JPL
160067	2000 BU_{5}	—	January 27, 2000	Socorro	LINEAR	·	3.8 km	MPC · JPL
160068	2000 CS_{10}	—	February 2, 2000	Socorro	LINEAR	·	4.6 km	MPC · JPL
160069	2000 CO_{12}	—	February 2, 2000	Socorro	LINEAR	·	2.1 km	MPC · JPL
160070	2000 CU_{98}	—	February 8, 2000	Kitt Peak	Spacewatch	·	6.2 km	MPC · JPL
160071	2000 CD_{100}	—	February 10, 2000	Kitt Peak	Spacewatch	·	3.4 km	MPC · JPL
160072	2000 DE_{8}	—	February 28, 2000	Kitt Peak	Spacewatch	·	1.2 km	MPC · JPL
160073	2000 DH_{60}	—	February 29, 2000	Socorro	LINEAR	·	1.4 km	MPC · JPL
160074	2000 EV_{125}	—	March 11, 2000	Anderson Mesa	LONEOS	·	1.3 km	MPC · JPL
160075	2000 FK_{34}	—	March 29, 2000	Socorro	LINEAR	·	2.1 km	MPC · JPL
160076	2000 GS_{8}	—	April 5, 2000	Socorro	LINEAR	EOS	4.3 km	MPC · JPL
160077	2000 GG_{27}	—	April 5, 2000	Socorro	LINEAR	·	1.4 km	MPC · JPL
160078	2000 GN_{154}	—	April 6, 2000	Anderson Mesa	LONEOS	·	1.4 km	MPC · JPL
160079	2000 GD_{175}	—	April 5, 2000	Anderson Mesa	LONEOS	·	1.5 km	MPC · JPL
160080	2000 HG_{21}	—	April 27, 2000	Socorro	LINEAR	·	1.9 km	MPC · JPL
160081	2000 JK_{40}	—	May 7, 2000	Socorro	LINEAR	·	2.4 km	MPC · JPL
160082	2000 KM_{58}	—	May 24, 2000	Anderson Mesa	LONEOS	·	1.4 km	MPC · JPL
160083	2000 KX_{67}	—	May 30, 2000	Anderson Mesa	LONEOS	·	1.8 km	MPC · JPL
160084	2000 KP_{74}	—	May 27, 2000	Socorro	LINEAR	·	2.3 km	MPC · JPL
160085	2000 LJ_{6}	—	June 5, 2000	Socorro	LINEAR	·	1.8 km	MPC · JPL
160086	2000 LT_{23}	—	June 7, 2000	Socorro	LINEAR	·	3.5 km	MPC · JPL
160087	2000 NT_{26}	—	July 4, 2000	Anderson Mesa	LONEOS	PHO	3.2 km	MPC · JPL
160088	2000 NG_{27}	—	July 4, 2000	Anderson Mesa	LONEOS	·	1.6 km	MPC · JPL
160089	2000 OP_{7}	—	July 30, 2000	Socorro	LINEAR	PHO	1.9 km	MPC · JPL
160090	2000 ON_{38}	—	July 30, 2000	Socorro	LINEAR	·	3.5 km	MPC · JPL
160091	2000 OL_{67}	—	July 29, 2000	Cerro Tololo	M. W. Buie, Kern, S. D.	cubewano (cold) · moon	140 km	MPC · JPL
160092	2000 PL_{6}	—	August 5, 2000	Haleakala	NEAT	·	4.5 km	MPC · JPL
160093	2000 QW_{44}	—	August 24, 2000	Socorro	LINEAR	NYS	1.6 km	MPC · JPL
160094	2000 QR_{67}	—	August 28, 2000	Socorro	LINEAR	V · slow	1.1 km	MPC · JPL
160095	2000 QU_{101}	—	August 28, 2000	Socorro	LINEAR	·	1.6 km	MPC · JPL
160096	2000 QJ_{118}	—	August 25, 2000	Socorro	LINEAR	V	1.3 km	MPC · JPL
160097	2000 QJ_{165}	—	August 31, 2000	Socorro	LINEAR	·	2.4 km	MPC · JPL
160098	2000 QX_{169}	—	August 31, 2000	Socorro	LINEAR	V	1.2 km	MPC · JPL
160099	2000 QR_{229}	—	August 31, 2000	Socorro	LINEAR	V	1.2 km	MPC · JPL
160100	2000 RD	—	September 1, 2000	Socorro	LINEAR	PHO	2.1 km	MPC · JPL

== 160101–160200 ==
back to top

Designation			Discovery			Properties		Ref
Permanent	Provisional	Named after	Date	Site	Discoverer(s)	Category	Diam.	Ref
160101	2000 RM_{23}	—	September 1, 2000	Socorro	LINEAR	·	2.3 km	MPC · JPL
160102	2000 RX_{73}	—	September 2, 2000	Socorro	LINEAR	NYS	2.0 km	MPC · JPL
160103	2000 RM_{104}	—	September 6, 2000	Socorro	LINEAR	·	2.4 km	MPC · JPL
160104	2000 SG_{27}	—	September 23, 2000	Socorro	LINEAR	·	3.8 km	MPC · JPL
160105 Gobi	2000 SK_{43}	Gobi	September 26, 2000	Colleverde	V. S. Casulli	·	1.8 km	MPC · JPL
160106	2000 SS_{62}	—	September 24, 2000	Socorro	LINEAR	·	1.7 km	MPC · JPL
160107	2000 SD_{98}	—	September 23, 2000	Socorro	LINEAR	ERI	3.8 km	MPC · JPL
160108	2000 SY_{144}	—	September 24, 2000	Socorro	LINEAR	·	1.4 km	MPC · JPL
160109	2000 SH_{148}	—	September 24, 2000	Socorro	LINEAR	NYS	1.9 km	MPC · JPL
160110	2000 SW_{152}	—	September 24, 2000	Socorro	LINEAR	·	2.3 km	MPC · JPL
160111	2000 SZ_{160}	—	September 27, 2000	Socorro	LINEAR	EUN	3.1 km	MPC · JPL
160112	2000 SP_{189}	—	September 22, 2000	Haleakala	NEAT	·	1.8 km	MPC · JPL
160113	2000 SK_{216}	—	September 26, 2000	Socorro	LINEAR	·	1.6 km	MPC · JPL
160114	2000 SX_{216}	—	September 26, 2000	Socorro	LINEAR	·	2.4 km	MPC · JPL
160115	2000 ST_{237}	—	September 25, 2000	Socorro	LINEAR	·	1.7 km	MPC · JPL
160116	2000 SR_{241}	—	September 24, 2000	Socorro	LINEAR	·	2.0 km	MPC · JPL
160117	2000 SY_{253}	—	September 24, 2000	Socorro	LINEAR	·	2.4 km	MPC · JPL
160118	2000 SU_{268}	—	September 27, 2000	Socorro	LINEAR	·	1.7 km	MPC · JPL
160119	2000 TM_{31}	—	October 4, 2000	Kitt Peak	Spacewatch	·	1.8 km	MPC · JPL
160120	2000 UU_{7}	—	October 24, 2000	Socorro	LINEAR	·	2.6 km	MPC · JPL
160121	2000 UZ_{44}	—	October 24, 2000	Socorro	LINEAR	·	2.1 km	MPC · JPL
160122	2000 UT_{60}	—	October 25, 2000	Socorro	LINEAR	·	3.1 km	MPC · JPL
160123	2000 UQ_{75}	—	October 31, 2000	Socorro	LINEAR	·	1.9 km	MPC · JPL
160124	2000 UM_{98}	—	October 25, 2000	Socorro	LINEAR	·	2.8 km	MPC · JPL
160125	2000 VF_{8}	—	November 1, 2000	Socorro	LINEAR	·	2.0 km	MPC · JPL
160126	2000 WW_{94}	—	November 21, 2000	Socorro	LINEAR	·	2.5 km	MPC · JPL
160127	2000 WX_{96}	—	November 21, 2000	Socorro	LINEAR	·	2.5 km	MPC · JPL
160128	2000 XK_{19}	—	December 4, 2000	Socorro	LINEAR	·	2.6 km	MPC · JPL
160129	2000 XP_{23}	—	December 4, 2000	Socorro	LINEAR	PHO	5.4 km	MPC · JPL
160130	2000 XU_{32}	—	December 4, 2000	Socorro	LINEAR	·	5.6 km	MPC · JPL
160131	2000 XS_{45}	—	December 15, 2000	Socorro	LINEAR	PHO	2.6 km	MPC · JPL
160132	2000 YJ_{7}	—	December 20, 2000	Socorro	LINEAR	LIX	7.0 km	MPC · JPL
160133	2000 YZ_{60}	—	December 30, 2000	Socorro	LINEAR	·	3.1 km	MPC · JPL
160134	2000 YP_{124}	—	December 29, 2000	Anderson Mesa	LONEOS	NYS	1.8 km	MPC · JPL
160135	2000 YB_{131}	—	December 30, 2000	Socorro	LINEAR	L4	20 km	MPC · JPL
160136	2001 BV_{10}	—	January 20, 2001	Socorro	LINEAR	H	1.0 km	MPC · JPL
160137	2001 BU_{41}	—	January 20, 2001	Socorro	LINEAR	·	4.1 km	MPC · JPL
160138	2001 CT_{35}	—	February 13, 2001	Socorro	LINEAR	H	1.3 km	MPC · JPL
160139	2001 CK_{47}	—	February 13, 2001	Kitt Peak	Spacewatch	·	3.7 km	MPC · JPL
160140	2001 DZ_{3}	—	February 16, 2001	Socorro	LINEAR	L4	19 km	MPC · JPL
160141	2001 DW_{8}	—	February 16, 2001	Socorro	LINEAR	H	830 m	MPC · JPL
160142	2001 DG_{101}	—	February 16, 2001	Socorro	LINEAR	·	5.0 km	MPC · JPL
160143	2001 ED_{17}	—	March 14, 2001	Socorro	LINEAR	H	1.1 km	MPC · JPL
160144	2001 FN_{52}	—	March 18, 2001	Socorro	LINEAR	·	3.7 km	MPC · JPL
160145	2001 FR_{88}	—	March 26, 2001	Kitt Peak	Spacewatch	NYS	1.5 km	MPC · JPL
160146	2001 HU_{22}	—	April 26, 2001	Desert Beaver	W. K. Y. Yeung	T_{j} (2.99) · EUP	8.1 km	MPC · JPL
160147	2001 KN_{76}	—	May 22, 2001	Cerro Tololo	M. W. Buie	cubewano (cold)	181 km	MPC · JPL
160148	2001 KV_{76}	—	May 24, 2001	Cerro Tololo	M. W. Buie	res · 2:7 · critical	115 km	MPC · JPL
160149	2001 LC_{10}	—	June 15, 2001	Socorro	LINEAR	·	1.3 km	MPC · JPL
160150	2001 MP_{30}	—	June 16, 2001	Anderson Mesa	LONEOS	EOS	5.2 km	MPC · JPL
160151	2001 ND_{2}	—	July 13, 2001	Palomar	NEAT	·	1.6 km	MPC · JPL
160152	2001 OS_{54}	—	July 22, 2001	Palomar	NEAT	·	8.1 km	MPC · JPL
160153	2001 OD_{59}	—	July 21, 2001	Haleakala	NEAT	HYG	5.4 km	MPC · JPL
160154	2001 QD_{103}	—	August 19, 2001	Socorro	LINEAR	MAS	1.0 km	MPC · JPL
160155	2001 QP_{138}	—	August 22, 2001	Socorro	LINEAR	·	1.5 km	MPC · JPL
160156	2001 QA_{283}	—	August 18, 2001	Anderson Mesa	LONEOS	·	8.2 km	MPC · JPL
160157	2001 RZ_{19}	—	September 7, 2001	Socorro	LINEAR	·	3.3 km	MPC · JPL
160158	2001 RS_{121}	—	September 12, 2001	Socorro	LINEAR	·	2.0 km	MPC · JPL
160159	2001 SU_{79}	—	September 20, 2001	Socorro	LINEAR	PHO	1.5 km	MPC · JPL
160160	2001 SL_{116}	—	September 21, 2001	Socorro	LINEAR	·	1.7 km	MPC · JPL
160161	2001 SF_{283}	—	September 22, 2001	Socorro	LINEAR	·	3.7 km	MPC · JPL
160162	2001 SX_{345}	—	September 23, 2001	Haleakala	NEAT	V	850 m	MPC · JPL
160163	2001 TB_{209}	—	October 12, 2001	Anderson Mesa	LONEOS	·	1.1 km	MPC · JPL
160164	2001 TW_{252}	—	October 14, 2001	Apache Point	SDSS	L5	10 km	MPC · JPL
160165	2001 UR	—	October 18, 2001	Emerald Lane	L. Ball	(5)	1.5 km	MPC · JPL
160166	2001 UH_{88}	—	October 21, 2001	Kitt Peak	Spacewatch	·	1.9 km	MPC · JPL
160167	2001 UH_{131}	—	October 20, 2001	Socorro	LINEAR	·	2.0 km	MPC · JPL
160168	2001 UF_{145}	—	October 23, 2001	Socorro	LINEAR	·	1.7 km	MPC · JPL
160169	2001 UJ_{149}	—	October 23, 2001	Socorro	LINEAR	·	1.6 km	MPC · JPL
160170	2001 VM_{40}	—	November 9, 2001	Socorro	LINEAR	·	2.7 km	MPC · JPL
160171	2001 VJ_{48}	—	November 9, 2001	Socorro	LINEAR	·	1.6 km	MPC · JPL
160172	2001 VP_{78}	—	November 15, 2001	Socorro	LINEAR	PHO	1.9 km	MPC · JPL
160173	2001 VR_{125}	—	November 12, 2001	Socorro	LINEAR	·	2.6 km	MPC · JPL
160174	2001 WZ_{7}	—	November 17, 2001	Socorro	LINEAR	(5)	1.7 km	MPC · JPL
160175	2001 WN_{28}	—	November 17, 2001	Socorro	LINEAR	·	3.2 km	MPC · JPL
160176	2001 WN_{29}	—	November 17, 2001	Socorro	LINEAR	·	1.6 km	MPC · JPL
160177	2001 WA_{58}	—	November 19, 2001	Socorro	LINEAR	·	1.1 km	MPC · JPL
160178	2001 WK_{61}	—	November 19, 2001	Socorro	LINEAR	·	1.4 km	MPC · JPL
160179	2001 WD_{75}	—	November 20, 2001	Socorro	LINEAR	·	2.1 km	MPC · JPL
160180	2001 WH_{77}	—	November 20, 2001	Socorro	LINEAR	·	2.5 km	MPC · JPL
160181	2001 WH_{88}	—	November 19, 2001	Socorro	LINEAR	·	2.1 km	MPC · JPL
160182	2001 WJ_{102}	—	November 19, 2001	Anderson Mesa	LONEOS	(5)	2.0 km	MPC · JPL
160183	2001 XA_{73}	—	December 11, 2001	Socorro	LINEAR	·	3.0 km	MPC · JPL
160184	2001 XM_{114}	—	December 13, 2001	Socorro	LINEAR	·	3.9 km	MPC · JPL
160185	2001 XF_{117}	—	December 13, 2001	Socorro	LINEAR	V	1.3 km	MPC · JPL
160186	2001 XB_{123}	—	December 14, 2001	Socorro	LINEAR	·	1.6 km	MPC · JPL
160187	2001 XU_{165}	—	December 14, 2001	Socorro	LINEAR	HOF	3.6 km	MPC · JPL
160188	2001 XA_{187}	—	December 14, 2001	Socorro	LINEAR	·	1.6 km	MPC · JPL
160189	2001 XS_{194}	—	December 14, 2001	Socorro	LINEAR	·	1.8 km	MPC · JPL
160190	2001 XA_{204}	—	December 11, 2001	Socorro	LINEAR	·	2.4 km	MPC · JPL
160191	2001 XK_{212}	—	December 11, 2001	Socorro	LINEAR	·	3.0 km	MPC · JPL
160192	2001 YU_{11}	—	December 18, 2001	Socorro	LINEAR	·	1.4 km	MPC · JPL
160193	2001 YH_{48}	—	December 18, 2001	Socorro	LINEAR	·	2.9 km	MPC · JPL
160194	2001 YK_{67}	—	December 18, 2001	Socorro	LINEAR	·	3.2 km	MPC · JPL
160195	2001 YF_{73}	—	December 18, 2001	Socorro	LINEAR	·	2.9 km	MPC · JPL
160196	2001 YT_{84}	—	December 18, 2001	Socorro	LINEAR	·	1.8 km	MPC · JPL
160197	2001 YP_{139}	—	December 24, 2001	Haleakala	NEAT	EUN	1.9 km	MPC · JPL
160198	2001 YH_{151}	—	December 19, 2001	Palomar	NEAT	·	1.4 km	MPC · JPL
160199	2002 AJ_{45}	—	January 9, 2002	Socorro	LINEAR	·	2.9 km	MPC · JPL
160200	2002 AT_{111}	—	January 9, 2002	Socorro	LINEAR	·	3.3 km	MPC · JPL

== 160201–160300 ==
back to top

Designation			Discovery			Properties		Ref
Permanent	Provisional	Named after	Date	Site	Discoverer(s)	Category	Diam.	Ref
160201	2002 AP_{151}	—	January 14, 2002	Socorro	LINEAR	·	3.4 km	MPC · JPL
160202	2002 BG_{20}	—	January 22, 2002	Palomar	NEAT	·	5.6 km	MPC · JPL
160203	2002 BH_{31}	—	January 21, 2002	Palomar	NEAT	·	2.1 km	MPC · JPL
160204	2002 CT_{30}	—	February 6, 2002	Socorro	LINEAR	·	1.3 km	MPC · JPL
160205	2002 CF_{35}	—	February 6, 2002	Socorro	LINEAR	EUN	2.7 km	MPC · JPL
160206	2002 CZ_{35}	—	February 7, 2002	Socorro	LINEAR	·	2.0 km	MPC · JPL
160207	2002 CE_{39}	—	February 10, 2002	Desert Eagle	W. K. Y. Yeung	EOS	2.4 km	MPC · JPL
160208	2002 CY_{77}	—	February 7, 2002	Socorro	LINEAR	EOS	2.2 km	MPC · JPL
160209	2002 CA_{96}	—	February 7, 2002	Socorro	LINEAR	EOS	4.3 km	MPC · JPL
160210	2002 CP_{110}	—	February 7, 2002	Socorro	LINEAR	THM	4.4 km	MPC · JPL
160211	2002 CQ_{196}	—	February 10, 2002	Socorro	LINEAR	·	3.4 km	MPC · JPL
160212	2002 CM_{198}	—	February 10, 2002	Socorro	LINEAR	TEL	1.9 km	MPC · JPL
160213	2002 CS_{252}	—	February 4, 2002	Palomar	NEAT	·	3.3 km	MPC · JPL
160214	2002 CD_{257}	—	February 5, 2002	Anderson Mesa	LONEOS	(31811)	4.1 km	MPC · JPL
160215 Haines-Stiles	2002 CB_{274}	Haines-Stiles	February 8, 2002	Kitt Peak	M. W. Buie	·	2.6 km	MPC · JPL
160216	2002 ES_{28}	—	March 9, 2002	Socorro	LINEAR	·	1.6 km	MPC · JPL
160217	2002 EZ_{39}	—	March 9, 2002	Socorro	LINEAR	·	3.6 km	MPC · JPL
160218	2002 EQ_{61}	—	March 13, 2002	Socorro	LINEAR	V	1.3 km	MPC · JPL
160219	2002 EM_{112}	—	March 10, 2002	Kitt Peak	Spacewatch	·	3.4 km	MPC · JPL
160220	2002 FP_{20}	—	March 18, 2002	Haleakala	NEAT	·	3.0 km	MPC · JPL
160221	2002 FL_{32}	—	March 20, 2002	Socorro	LINEAR	·	2.1 km	MPC · JPL
160222	2002 GF_{24}	—	April 15, 2002	Palomar	NEAT	GEF	2.4 km	MPC · JPL
160223	2002 GK_{46}	—	April 2, 2002	Palomar	NEAT	·	5.3 km	MPC · JPL
160224	2002 GT_{59}	—	April 8, 2002	Palomar	NEAT	·	5.1 km	MPC · JPL
160225	2002 GC_{60}	—	April 8, 2002	Socorro	LINEAR	·	3.5 km	MPC · JPL
160226	2002 GZ_{93}	—	April 9, 2002	Socorro	LINEAR	·	2.2 km	MPC · JPL
160227	2002 GK_{107}	—	April 11, 2002	Palomar	NEAT	·	3.0 km	MPC · JPL
160228	2002 GQ_{112}	—	April 10, 2002	Socorro	LINEAR	·	3.6 km	MPC · JPL
160229	2002 GN_{144}	—	April 11, 2002	Palomar	NEAT	·	3.9 km	MPC · JPL
160230	2002 GY_{181}	—	April 8, 2002	Kitt Peak	Spacewatch	·	2.4 km	MPC · JPL
160231	2002 HA	—	April 16, 2002	Kvistaberg	Uppsala-DLR Asteroid Survey	·	3.6 km	MPC · JPL
160232	2002 HP_{7}	—	April 19, 2002	Kitt Peak	Spacewatch	·	3.1 km	MPC · JPL
160233	2002 JQ_{14}	—	May 8, 2002	Socorro	LINEAR	(194)	3.3 km	MPC · JPL
160234	2002 JM_{23}	—	May 8, 2002	Socorro	LINEAR	HIL · 3:2	9.4 km	MPC · JPL
160235	2002 JP_{37}	—	May 8, 2002	Haleakala	NEAT	JUN	2.3 km	MPC · JPL
160236	2002 JH_{56}	—	May 9, 2002	Socorro	LINEAR	·	4.0 km	MPC · JPL
160237	2002 JX_{100}	—	May 14, 2002	Palomar	NEAT	·	4.5 km	MPC · JPL
160238	2002 JG_{111}	—	May 11, 2002	Socorro	LINEAR	(18466)	4.2 km	MPC · JPL
160239	2002 JR_{118}	—	May 5, 2002	Anderson Mesa	LONEOS	·	3.0 km	MPC · JPL
160240	2002 JO_{119}	—	May 5, 2002	Palomar	NEAT	·	3.2 km	MPC · JPL
160241	2002 JO_{145}	—	May 14, 2002	Palomar	NEAT	·	2.3 km	MPC · JPL
160242	2002 MX_{1}	—	June 16, 2002	Palomar	NEAT	·	6.6 km	MPC · JPL
160243	2002 NM_{32}	—	July 13, 2002	Socorro	LINEAR	·	10 km	MPC · JPL
160244	2002 NN_{35}	—	July 9, 2002	Socorro	LINEAR	·	4.5 km	MPC · JPL
160245	2002 NZ_{56}	—	July 14, 2002	Palomar	S. F. Hönig	·	3.4 km	MPC · JPL
160246	2002 OV_{2}	—	July 17, 2002	Socorro	LINEAR	·	6.3 km	MPC · JPL
160247	2002 OF_{3}	—	July 17, 2002	Socorro	LINEAR	EOS	4.3 km	MPC · JPL
160248	2002 ON_{7}	—	July 20, 2002	Palomar	NEAT	EMA	6.8 km	MPC · JPL
160249	2002 PH_{23}	—	August 6, 2002	Palomar	NEAT	EOS	3.3 km	MPC · JPL
160250	2002 PZ_{32}	—	August 6, 2002	Palomar	NEAT	EOS	4.4 km	MPC · JPL
160251	2002 PF_{41}	—	August 4, 2002	Socorro	LINEAR	·	7.0 km	MPC · JPL
160252	2002 PW_{41}	—	August 5, 2002	Socorro	LINEAR	·	5.9 km	MPC · JPL
160253	2002 PH_{49}	—	August 10, 2002	Socorro	LINEAR	EOS	3.1 km	MPC · JPL
160254	2002 PF_{69}	—	August 11, 2002	Socorro	LINEAR	·	4.0 km	MPC · JPL
160255	2002 PJ_{131}	—	August 14, 2002	Palomar	NEAT	·	6.5 km	MPC · JPL
160256	2002 PD_{149}	—	August 10, 2002	Cerro Tololo	M. W. Buie	cubewano (cold) · moon	160 km	MPC · JPL
160257	2002 QW_{24}	—	August 28, 2002	Socorro	LINEAR	(7605)	9.3 km	MPC · JPL
160258	2002 QB_{25}	—	August 28, 2002	Socorro	LINEAR	H	1.2 km	MPC · JPL
160259 Mareike	2002 QH_{53}	Mareike	August 29, 2002	Palomar	S. F. Hönig	CYB	5.3 km	MPC · JPL
160260	2002 QZ_{104}	—	August 26, 2002	Palomar	NEAT	·	4.7 km	MPC · JPL
160261	2002 RZ_{5}	—	September 1, 2002	Haleakala	NEAT	EOS	4.4 km	MPC · JPL
160262	2002 RO_{8}	—	September 3, 2002	Haleakala	NEAT	EOS	3.9 km	MPC · JPL
160263	2002 RE_{13}	—	September 4, 2002	Anderson Mesa	LONEOS	LUT	9.5 km	MPC · JPL
160264	2002 RF_{64}	—	September 5, 2002	Socorro	LINEAR	·	5.4 km	MPC · JPL
160265	2002 RH_{75}	—	September 5, 2002	Socorro	LINEAR	·	6.3 km	MPC · JPL
160266	2002 SO_{15}	—	September 27, 2002	Palomar	NEAT	·	9.9 km	MPC · JPL
160267	2002 SY_{18}	—	September 27, 2002	Socorro	LINEAR	·	4.9 km	MPC · JPL
160268	2002 SP_{20}	—	September 26, 2002	Palomar	NEAT	THM	3.8 km	MPC · JPL
160269	2002 SW_{51}	—	September 17, 2002	Palomar	NEAT	·	5.3 km	MPC · JPL
160270	2002 TU_{59}	—	October 4, 2002	Socorro	LINEAR	H	950 m	MPC · JPL
160271	2002 TN_{60}	—	October 5, 2002	Socorro	LINEAR	H · slow	970 m	MPC · JPL
160272	2002 TW_{64}	—	October 4, 2002	Socorro	LINEAR	H	1.2 km	MPC · JPL
160273	2002 TS_{110}	—	October 2, 2002	Haleakala	NEAT	·	8.0 km	MPC · JPL
160274	2002 TX_{118}	—	October 3, 2002	Palomar	NEAT	LIX	6.2 km	MPC · JPL
160275	2002 TH_{130}	—	October 4, 2002	Socorro	LINEAR	EOS	3.6 km	MPC · JPL
160276	2002 TH_{216}	—	October 6, 2002	Socorro	LINEAR	·	7.8 km	MPC · JPL
160277	2002 TX_{222}	—	October 7, 2002	Socorro	LINEAR	·	6.4 km	MPC · JPL
160278	2002 TQ_{236}	—	October 6, 2002	Socorro	LINEAR	TIR ·	11 km	MPC · JPL
160279	2002 TJ_{376}	—	October 6, 2002	Socorro	LINEAR	·	7.9 km	MPC · JPL
160280	2002 UF_{5}	—	October 28, 2002	Palomar	NEAT	·	5.2 km	MPC · JPL
160281	2002 WO	—	November 21, 2002	Palomar	NEAT	H · slow	1.0 km	MPC · JPL
160282	2002 YL_{10}	—	December 31, 2002	Socorro	LINEAR	·	1.8 km	MPC · JPL
160283	2003 AH_{38}	—	January 7, 2003	Socorro	LINEAR	·	1.4 km	MPC · JPL
160284	2003 AX_{67}	—	January 8, 2003	Socorro	LINEAR	·	1.2 km	MPC · JPL
160285	2003 AC_{83}	—	January 12, 2003	Socorro	LINEAR	(5)	1.8 km	MPC · JPL
160286	2003 BC_{40}	—	January 27, 2003	Kitt Peak	Spacewatch	·	1.6 km	MPC · JPL
160287	2003 BO_{58}	—	January 27, 2003	Socorro	LINEAR	·	1.3 km	MPC · JPL
160288	2003 BD_{65}	—	January 30, 2003	Anderson Mesa	LONEOS	·	2.6 km	MPC · JPL
160289	2003 BM_{66}	—	January 30, 2003	Anderson Mesa	LONEOS	·	2.0 km	MPC · JPL
160290	2003 BV_{82}	—	January 31, 2003	Anderson Mesa	LONEOS	·	1.8 km	MPC · JPL
160291	2003 CP_{6}	—	February 1, 2003	Socorro	LINEAR	·	1.5 km	MPC · JPL
160292	2003 DM_{6}	—	February 20, 2003	Kvistaberg	Uppsala-DLR Asteroid Survey	·	1.3 km	MPC · JPL
160293	2003 DK_{24}	—	February 21, 2003	Palomar	NEAT	·	2.6 km	MPC · JPL
160294	2003 EB_{33}	—	March 7, 2003	Anderson Mesa	LONEOS	·	2.1 km	MPC · JPL
160295	2003 EY_{49}	—	March 10, 2003	Kitt Peak	Spacewatch	·	2.0 km	MPC · JPL
160296	2003 FE_{12}	—	March 24, 2003	Kitt Peak	Spacewatch	V	1.2 km	MPC · JPL
160297	2003 FV_{22}	—	March 22, 2003	Haleakala	NEAT	·	2.1 km	MPC · JPL
160298	2003 FD_{72}	—	March 26, 2003	Palomar	NEAT	·	2.2 km	MPC · JPL
160299	2003 FN_{90}	—	March 29, 2003	Anderson Mesa	LONEOS	PHO	2.5 km	MPC · JPL
160300	2003 FR_{91}	—	March 29, 2003	Anderson Mesa	LONEOS	(5)	1.7 km	MPC · JPL

== 160301–160400 ==
back to top

Designation			Discovery			Properties		Ref
Permanent	Provisional	Named after	Date	Site	Discoverer(s)	Category	Diam.	Ref
160301	2003 FQ_{100}	—	March 31, 2003	Anderson Mesa	LONEOS	·	2.4 km	MPC · JPL
160302	2003 FZ_{101}	—	March 31, 2003	Socorro	LINEAR	·	3.1 km	MPC · JPL
160303	2003 FE_{111}	—	March 31, 2003	Socorro	LINEAR	·	1.7 km	MPC · JPL
160304	2003 GW_{1}	—	April 2, 2003	Haleakala	NEAT	·	2.5 km	MPC · JPL
160305	2003 GK_{2}	—	April 1, 2003	Socorro	LINEAR	THM	3.6 km	MPC · JPL
160306	2003 GE_{5}	—	April 1, 2003	Socorro	LINEAR	·	1.4 km	MPC · JPL
160307	2003 GA_{6}	—	April 1, 2003	Socorro	LINEAR	NYS	2.0 km	MPC · JPL
160308	2003 GX_{12}	—	April 1, 2003	Socorro	LINEAR	·	4.7 km	MPC · JPL
160309	2003 GT_{16}	—	April 4, 2003	Socorro	LINEAR	·	3.5 km	MPC · JPL
160310	2003 GA_{32}	—	April 8, 2003	Socorro	LINEAR	NYS	1.3 km	MPC · JPL
160311	2003 GA_{37}	—	April 6, 2003	Anderson Mesa	LONEOS	·	4.1 km	MPC · JPL
160312	2003 GT_{39}	—	April 8, 2003	Socorro	LINEAR	·	1.9 km	MPC · JPL
160313	2003 HX_{28}	—	April 28, 2003	Anderson Mesa	LONEOS	·	2.7 km	MPC · JPL
160314	2003 HZ_{42}	—	April 28, 2003	Socorro	LINEAR	NYS	1.9 km	MPC · JPL
160315	2003 HO_{49}	—	April 30, 2003	Haleakala	NEAT	·	6.0 km	MPC · JPL
160316	2003 HD_{51}	—	April 28, 2003	Haleakala	NEAT	·	2.4 km	MPC · JPL
160317	2003 JE_{5}	—	May 1, 2003	Socorro	LINEAR	JUN	1.2 km	MPC · JPL
160318	2003 JR_{8}	—	May 2, 2003	Socorro	LINEAR	·	5.7 km	MPC · JPL
160319	2003 JQ_{10}	—	May 2, 2003	Kitt Peak	Spacewatch	ERI	3.5 km	MPC · JPL
160320	2003 KF_{12}	—	May 27, 2003	Anderson Mesa	LONEOS	·	2.7 km	MPC · JPL
160321	2003 KP_{13}	—	May 26, 2003	Haleakala	NEAT	·	4.7 km	MPC · JPL
160322	2003 LA_{4}	—	June 5, 2003	Reedy Creek	J. Broughton	·	2.5 km	MPC · JPL
160323	2003 MZ_{8}	—	June 28, 2003	Socorro	LINEAR	·	1.7 km	MPC · JPL
160324	2003 ME_{10}	—	June 29, 2003	Socorro	LINEAR	·	2.7 km	MPC · JPL
160325	2003 NV_{1}	—	July 2, 2003	Siding Spring	R. H. McNaught	·	8.6 km	MPC · JPL
160326	2003 NF_{7}	—	July 7, 2003	Reedy Creek	J. Broughton	·	4.3 km	MPC · JPL
160327	2003 NJ_{10}	—	July 3, 2003	Kitt Peak	Spacewatch	·	1.7 km	MPC · JPL
160328	2003 OG_{4}	—	July 21, 2003	Campo Imperatore	CINEOS	(5)	1.9 km	MPC · JPL
160329	2003 OC_{31}	—	July 30, 2003	Socorro	LINEAR	·	1.6 km	MPC · JPL
160330	2003 QN_{42}	—	August 22, 2003	Socorro	LINEAR	·	2.9 km	MPC · JPL
160331	2003 QS_{57}	—	August 23, 2003	Socorro	LINEAR	·	2.2 km	MPC · JPL
160332	2003 QU_{60}	—	August 23, 2003	Socorro	LINEAR	·	4.6 km	MPC · JPL
160333	2003 QC_{79}	—	August 24, 2003	Socorro	LINEAR	·	3.1 km	MPC · JPL
160334	2003 QH_{109}	—	August 31, 2003	Socorro	LINEAR	·	3.1 km	MPC · JPL
160335	2003 RK_{3}	—	September 1, 2003	Socorro	LINEAR	·	3.2 km	MPC · JPL
160336	2003 RW_{4}	—	September 3, 2003	Haleakala	NEAT	EUN	2.1 km	MPC · JPL
160337	2003 RF_{18}	—	September 15, 2003	Palomar	NEAT	·	3.9 km	MPC · JPL
160338	2003 SR_{52}	—	September 19, 2003	Palomar	NEAT	·	3.5 km	MPC · JPL
160339	2003 SY_{66}	—	September 19, 2003	Campo Imperatore	CINEOS	·	3.6 km	MPC · JPL
160340	2003 SB_{100}	—	September 20, 2003	Palomar	NEAT	·	4.7 km	MPC · JPL
160341	2003 ST_{103}	—	September 20, 2003	Socorro	LINEAR	AGN	2.3 km	MPC · JPL
160342	2003 SW_{103}	—	September 20, 2003	Socorro	LINEAR	NEM	4.0 km	MPC · JPL
160343	2003 SP_{139}	—	September 18, 2003	Socorro	LINEAR	·	3.9 km	MPC · JPL
160344	2003 SG_{145}	—	September 20, 2003	Campo Imperatore	CINEOS	·	4.3 km	MPC · JPL
160345	2003 SJ_{175}	—	September 18, 2003	Kitt Peak	Spacewatch	·	2.6 km	MPC · JPL
160346	2003 SB_{296}	—	September 29, 2003	Anderson Mesa	LONEOS	GEF	2.2 km	MPC · JPL
160347	2003 TL_{16}	—	October 15, 2003	Anderson Mesa	LONEOS	AGN	2.4 km	MPC · JPL
160348	2003 TY_{20}	—	October 15, 2003	Anderson Mesa	LONEOS	·	3.2 km	MPC · JPL
160349	2003 UA_{28}	—	October 22, 2003	Goodricke-Pigott	Goodricke-Pigott	WIT	1.8 km	MPC · JPL
160350	2003 UY_{49}	—	October 16, 2003	Haleakala	NEAT	·	4.1 km	MPC · JPL
160351	2003 UZ_{85}	—	October 18, 2003	Palomar	NEAT	·	6.9 km	MPC · JPL
160352	2003 UJ_{138}	—	October 21, 2003	Socorro	LINEAR	·	4.6 km	MPC · JPL
160353	2003 UV_{162}	—	October 21, 2003	Socorro	LINEAR	·	4.8 km	MPC · JPL
160354	2003 UO_{198}	—	October 21, 2003	Kitt Peak	Spacewatch	AGN	2.4 km	MPC · JPL
160355	2003 UT_{226}	—	October 22, 2003	Socorro	LINEAR	T_{j} (2.97)	7.9 km	MPC · JPL
160356	2003 UU_{278}	—	October 25, 2003	Socorro	LINEAR	·	2.3 km	MPC · JPL
160357	2003 WF_{117}	—	November 20, 2003	Socorro	LINEAR	·	3.4 km	MPC · JPL
160358	2003 WE_{159}	—	November 29, 2003	Socorro	LINEAR	·	6.4 km	MPC · JPL
160359	2003 XV_{6}	—	December 3, 2003	Socorro	LINEAR	·	7.8 km	MPC · JPL
160360	2003 XU_{12}	—	December 14, 2003	Palomar	NEAT	·	7.9 km	MPC · JPL
160361	2003 YD_{66}	—	December 20, 2003	Socorro	LINEAR	·	2.2 km	MPC · JPL
160362	2003 YP_{90}	—	December 20, 2003	Socorro	LINEAR	EUP	7.2 km	MPC · JPL
160363	2003 YP_{107}	—	December 17, 2003	Socorro	LINEAR	·	6.9 km	MPC · JPL
160364	2004 BW_{115}	—	January 26, 2004	Anderson Mesa	LONEOS	HYG	5.3 km	MPC · JPL
160365	2004 DC_{66}	—	February 23, 2004	Socorro	LINEAR	·	760 m	MPC · JPL
160366	2004 ER_{16}	—	March 12, 2004	Palomar	NEAT	·	1.3 km	MPC · JPL
160367	2004 EN_{37}	—	March 14, 2004	Palomar	NEAT	EUP	12 km	MPC · JPL
160368	2004 EY_{42}	—	March 15, 2004	Catalina	CSS	·	1.1 km	MPC · JPL
160369	2004 FW_{34}	—	March 16, 2004	Socorro	LINEAR	·	990 m	MPC · JPL
160370	2004 FK_{36}	—	March 16, 2004	Socorro	LINEAR	·	1.5 km	MPC · JPL
160371	2004 FG_{47}	—	March 18, 2004	Kitt Peak	Spacewatch	·	1.0 km	MPC · JPL
160372	2004 FC_{51}	—	March 18, 2004	Kitt Peak	Spacewatch	·	1.1 km	MPC · JPL
160373	2004 FU_{63}	—	March 19, 2004	Socorro	LINEAR	MAS	1.1 km	MPC · JPL
160374	2004 GR_{22}	—	April 12, 2004	Anderson Mesa	LONEOS	·	990 m	MPC · JPL
160375	2004 HG_{6}	—	April 17, 2004	Socorro	LINEAR	·	1.9 km	MPC · JPL
160376	2004 HS_{27}	—	April 20, 2004	Socorro	LINEAR	·	1.3 km	MPC · JPL
160377	2004 HY_{27}	—	April 20, 2004	Socorro	LINEAR	·	1.3 km	MPC · JPL
160378	2004 HN_{30}	—	April 21, 2004	Socorro	LINEAR	·	3.0 km	MPC · JPL
160379	2004 HX_{59}	—	April 23, 2004	Socorro	LINEAR	·	2.7 km	MPC · JPL
160380	2004 HB_{67}	—	April 21, 2004	Kitt Peak	Spacewatch	·	5.4 km	MPC · JPL
160381	2004 JV_{6}	—	May 11, 2004	Mauna Kea	Pittichová, J., Moskovitz, N.	·	930 m	MPC · JPL
160382	2004 JX_{16}	—	May 12, 2004	Catalina	CSS	·	1.2 km	MPC · JPL
160383	2004 JL_{19}	—	May 13, 2004	Palomar	NEAT	·	1.6 km	MPC · JPL
160384	2004 JA_{30}	—	May 15, 2004	Socorro	LINEAR	V	1.1 km	MPC · JPL
160385	2004 JJ_{35}	—	May 15, 2004	Socorro	LINEAR	·	2.1 km	MPC · JPL
160386	2004 JX_{37}	—	May 14, 2004	Socorro	LINEAR	PHO	3.6 km	MPC · JPL
160387	2004 JS_{44}	—	May 15, 2004	Socorro	LINEAR	·	1.3 km	MPC · JPL
160388	2004 LC_{7}	—	June 11, 2004	Socorro	LINEAR	·	1.2 km	MPC · JPL
160389	2004 LO_{23}	—	June 15, 2004	Needville	J. Dellinger, Eastman, M.	NYS	1.3 km	MPC · JPL
160390	2004 NQ_{8}	—	July 14, 2004	Reedy Creek	J. Broughton	·	2.2 km	MPC · JPL
160391	2004 NJ_{20}	—	July 14, 2004	Socorro	LINEAR	PHO	2.7 km	MPC · JPL
160392	2004 OJ_{7}	—	July 16, 2004	Socorro	LINEAR	·	2.4 km	MPC · JPL
160393	2004 PZ_{6}	—	August 6, 2004	Palomar	NEAT	·	2.5 km	MPC · JPL
160394	2004 PB_{23}	—	August 8, 2004	Socorro	LINEAR	·	4.2 km	MPC · JPL
160395	2004 PF_{74}	—	August 8, 2004	Socorro	LINEAR	EOS	3.8 km	MPC · JPL
160396	2004 PY_{84}	—	August 10, 2004	Socorro	LINEAR	·	1.2 km	MPC · JPL
160397	2004 PJ_{85}	—	August 10, 2004	Socorro	LINEAR	·	1.4 km	MPC · JPL
160398	2004 PT_{103}	—	August 12, 2004	Socorro	LINEAR	·	1.5 km	MPC · JPL
160399	2004 PA_{105}	—	August 12, 2004	Socorro	LINEAR	·	1.5 km	MPC · JPL
160400	2004 RO_{5}	—	September 4, 2004	Palomar	NEAT	·	1.0 km	MPC · JPL

== 160401–160500 ==
back to top

Designation			Discovery			Properties		Ref
Permanent	Provisional	Named after	Date	Site	Discoverer(s)	Category	Diam.	Ref
160401	2004 RC_{120}	—	September 7, 2004	Kitt Peak	Spacewatch	·	2.2 km	MPC · JPL
160402	2004 RU_{192}	—	September 10, 2004	Socorro	LINEAR	·	1.5 km	MPC · JPL
160403	2004 RE_{194}	—	September 10, 2004	Socorro	LINEAR	·	1.3 km	MPC · JPL
160404	2004 RC_{196}	—	September 10, 2004	Socorro	LINEAR	PHO	5.2 km	MPC · JPL
160405	2004 RO_{201}	—	September 10, 2004	Kitt Peak	Spacewatch	·	950 m	MPC · JPL
160406	2004 TR_{10}	—	October 7, 2004	Socorro	LINEAR	·	1.3 km	MPC · JPL
160407	2004 TP_{115}	—	October 4, 2004	Kitt Peak	Spacewatch	·	2.2 km	MPC · JPL
160408	2004 VD_{7}	—	November 3, 2004	Kitt Peak	Spacewatch	·	2.2 km	MPC · JPL
160409	2004 VJ_{7}	—	November 3, 2004	Kitt Peak	Spacewatch	(2076)	1.1 km	MPC · JPL
160410	2004 VW_{15}	—	November 2, 2004	Anderson Mesa	LONEOS	·	1.2 km	MPC · JPL
160411	2004 VC_{63}	—	November 7, 2004	Socorro	LINEAR	·	2.5 km	MPC · JPL
160412	2004 XO_{8}	—	December 2, 2004	Socorro	LINEAR	·	1.5 km	MPC · JPL
160413	2004 XF_{25}	—	December 9, 2004	Catalina	CSS	(10369)	5.6 km	MPC · JPL
160414	2004 XW_{32}	—	December 10, 2004	Socorro	LINEAR	·	1.3 km	MPC · JPL
160415	2004 XA_{78}	—	December 10, 2004	Socorro	LINEAR	·	1.3 km	MPC · JPL
160416	2004 YP_{2}	—	December 16, 2004	Catalina	CSS	·	3.1 km	MPC · JPL
160417	2004 YL_{22}	—	December 18, 2004	Mount Lemmon	Mount Lemmon Survey	·	2.8 km	MPC · JPL
160418	2005 AR_{8}	—	January 6, 2005	Catalina	CSS	·	6.6 km	MPC · JPL
160419	2005 AA_{55}	—	January 15, 2005	Catalina	CSS	·	3.6 km	MPC · JPL
160420	2005 AZ_{65}	—	January 13, 2005	Kitt Peak	Spacewatch	·	2.5 km	MPC · JPL
160421	2005 BG_{13}	—	January 17, 2005	Socorro	LINEAR	NYS	2.6 km	MPC · JPL
160422	2005 CD_{22}	—	February 3, 2005	Socorro	LINEAR	EOS	3.2 km	MPC · JPL
160423	2005 EU_{10}	—	March 2, 2005	Kitt Peak	Spacewatch	·	7.8 km	MPC · JPL
160424	2005 EM_{243}	—	March 11, 2005	Anderson Mesa	LONEOS	·	7.2 km	MPC · JPL
160425	2005 JF	—	May 2, 2005	Reedy Creek	J. Broughton	·	1.7 km	MPC · JPL
160426	2005 QL_{114}	—	August 27, 2005	Palomar	NEAT	THM	4.3 km	MPC · JPL
160427	2005 RL_{43}	—	September 3, 2005	Apache Point	A. C. Becker, Puckett, A. W., Kubica, J.	centaur	145 km	MPC · JPL
160428	2005 SV_{12}	—	September 24, 2005	Kitt Peak	Spacewatch	·	2.6 km	MPC · JPL
160429	2005 SZ_{26}	—	September 23, 2005	Kitt Peak	Spacewatch	NYS	1.4 km	MPC · JPL
160430	2005 SQ_{30}	—	September 23, 2005	Kitt Peak	Spacewatch	KOR	2.5 km	MPC · JPL
160431	2005 ST_{33}	—	September 23, 2005	Kitt Peak	Spacewatch	·	1.9 km	MPC · JPL
160432	2005 SF_{74}	—	September 24, 2005	Kitt Peak	Spacewatch	·	1.4 km	MPC · JPL
160433	2005 SJ_{75}	—	September 24, 2005	Kitt Peak	Spacewatch	THM	2.6 km	MPC · JPL
160434	2005 SM_{75}	—	September 24, 2005	Kitt Peak	Spacewatch	·	2.0 km	MPC · JPL
160435	2005 SA_{78}	—	September 24, 2005	Kitt Peak	Spacewatch	KOR	1.8 km	MPC · JPL
160436	2005 SX_{128}	—	September 29, 2005	Palomar	NEAT	·	2.8 km	MPC · JPL
160437	2005 SS_{139}	—	September 25, 2005	Kitt Peak	Spacewatch	·	1.6 km	MPC · JPL
160438	2005 SP_{140}	—	September 25, 2005	Kitt Peak	Spacewatch	·	2.2 km	MPC · JPL
160439	2005 SS_{204}	—	September 30, 2005	Anderson Mesa	LONEOS	AGN	1.5 km	MPC · JPL
160440	2005 SJ_{239}	—	September 30, 2005	Kitt Peak	Spacewatch	·	2.3 km	MPC · JPL
160441	2005 SW_{252}	—	September 24, 2005	Palomar	NEAT	PAD	2.7 km	MPC · JPL
160442	2005 SE_{253}	—	September 24, 2005	Palomar	NEAT	·	4.4 km	MPC · JPL
160443	2005 TP_{36}	—	October 1, 2005	Mount Lemmon	Mount Lemmon Survey	·	1.6 km	MPC · JPL
160444	2005 TP_{54}	—	October 1, 2005	Catalina	CSS	V	850 m	MPC · JPL
160445	2005 TU_{78}	—	October 7, 2005	Catalina	CSS	·	3.4 km	MPC · JPL
160446	2005 UG_{227}	—	October 25, 2005	Kitt Peak	Spacewatch	·	1.8 km	MPC · JPL
160447	2005 UQ_{245}	—	October 26, 2005	Kitt Peak	Spacewatch	·	1.8 km	MPC · JPL
160448	2005 UK_{433}	—	October 28, 2005	Kitt Peak	Spacewatch	·	1.4 km	MPC · JPL
160449	2005 US_{433}	—	October 28, 2005	Kitt Peak	Spacewatch	NYS	2.1 km	MPC · JPL
160450	2005 UX_{475}	—	October 22, 2005	Catalina	CSS	GEF	1.8 km	MPC · JPL
160451	2005 UO_{496}	—	October 26, 2005	Palomar	NEAT	ADE	4.1 km	MPC · JPL
160452	2005 UK_{498}	—	October 27, 2005	Catalina	CSS	·	2.2 km	MPC · JPL
160453	2005 VK_{118}	—	November 12, 2005	Socorro	LINEAR	H	1.1 km	MPC · JPL
160454	2005 WU_{27}	—	November 21, 2005	Kitt Peak	Spacewatch	MAS	670 m	MPC · JPL
160455	2005 WX_{81}	—	November 28, 2005	Socorro	LINEAR	KOR	2.1 km	MPC · JPL
160456	2005 WH_{117}	—	November 28, 2005	Socorro	LINEAR	H	890 m	MPC · JPL
160457	2005 YW_{168}	—	December 29, 2005	Palomar	NEAT	·	1.3 km	MPC · JPL
160458	2005 YT_{174}	—	December 29, 2005	Palomar	NEAT	H	1.0 km	MPC · JPL
160459	2005 YL_{188}	—	December 28, 2005	Mount Lemmon	Mount Lemmon Survey	NYS	1.7 km	MPC · JPL
160460	2006 BH_{22}	—	January 22, 2006	Mount Lemmon	Mount Lemmon Survey	·	2.0 km	MPC · JPL
160461	2006 BG_{38}	—	January 23, 2006	Mount Lemmon	Mount Lemmon Survey	NYS	2.3 km	MPC · JPL
160462	2006 BR_{73}	—	January 23, 2006	Kitt Peak	Spacewatch	(2076)	1.7 km	MPC · JPL
160463	2006 BJ_{118}	—	January 26, 2006	Kitt Peak	Spacewatch	CLO	4.0 km	MPC · JPL
160464	2006 BQ_{145}	—	January 23, 2006	Catalina	CSS	·	3.4 km	MPC · JPL
160465	2006 BL_{226}	—	January 30, 2006	Kitt Peak	Spacewatch	L5	10 km	MPC · JPL
160466	2006 CL_{47}	—	February 3, 2006	Kitt Peak	Spacewatch	·	3.7 km	MPC · JPL
160467	2006 DC_{63}	—	February 22, 2006	Mount Lemmon	Mount Lemmon Survey	KOR	2.5 km	MPC · JPL
160468	2006 DZ_{67}	—	February 24, 2006	Palomar	NEAT	·	3.6 km	MPC · JPL
160469	2006 DK_{114}	—	February 27, 2006	Catalina	CSS	EUN	2.9 km	MPC · JPL
160470	2006 FG_{20}	—	March 23, 2006	Mount Lemmon	Mount Lemmon Survey	·	3.5 km	MPC · JPL
160471	2006 FB_{49}	—	March 25, 2006	Catalina	CSS	·	6.1 km	MPC · JPL
160472	2006 HM_{35}	—	April 19, 2006	Catalina	CSS	·	4.4 km	MPC · JPL
160473	2006 HO_{83}	—	April 26, 2006	Kitt Peak	Spacewatch	·	2.2 km	MPC · JPL
160474	2006 JM_{31}	—	May 3, 2006	Kitt Peak	Spacewatch	·	5.7 km	MPC · JPL
160475	2006 KR_{12}	—	May 20, 2006	Kitt Peak	Spacewatch	EOS	3.0 km	MPC · JPL
160476	2006 SO_{124}	—	September 19, 2006	Catalina	CSS	·	2.1 km	MPC · JPL
160477	2006 VF_{148}	—	November 15, 2006	Mount Lemmon	Mount Lemmon Survey	·	6.6 km	MPC · JPL
160478	2006 WO_{82}	—	November 18, 2006	Kitt Peak	Spacewatch	·	2.8 km	MPC · JPL
160479	2006 WJ_{168}	—	November 23, 2006	Kitt Peak	Spacewatch	THM	2.8 km	MPC · JPL
160480	2006 XE_{26}	—	December 12, 2006	Catalina	CSS	·	3.1 km	MPC · JPL
160481	2006 XH_{32}	—	December 9, 2006	Kitt Peak	Spacewatch	·	4.7 km	MPC · JPL
160482	2007 AM_{5}	—	January 8, 2007	Mount Lemmon	Mount Lemmon Survey	·	1.2 km	MPC · JPL
160483	2007 AS_{14}	—	January 10, 2007	Kitt Peak	Spacewatch	(21885)	5.9 km	MPC · JPL
160484	2007 AF_{27}	—	January 10, 2007	Kitt Peak	Spacewatch	·	1.2 km	MPC · JPL
160485	2007 BL_{2}	—	January 16, 2007	Anderson Mesa	LONEOS	EOS	2.6 km	MPC · JPL
160486	2007 BU_{18}	—	January 17, 2007	Kitt Peak	Spacewatch	·	840 m	MPC · JPL
160487	2007 BL_{20}	—	January 23, 2007	Anderson Mesa	LONEOS	MAS	1.2 km	MPC · JPL
160488	2007 BD_{33}	—	January 24, 2007	Mount Lemmon	Mount Lemmon Survey	·	3.1 km	MPC · JPL
160489	2007 BV_{44}	—	January 25, 2007	Catalina	CSS	·	1.3 km	MPC · JPL
160490	2007 BB_{45}	—	January 25, 2007	Catalina	CSS	·	1.4 km	MPC · JPL
160491	2007 CC_{11}	—	February 6, 2007	Mount Lemmon	Mount Lemmon Survey	EOS	2.2 km	MPC · JPL
160492	2007 CU_{11}	—	February 6, 2007	Palomar	NEAT	·	4.4 km	MPC · JPL
160493 Nantou	2007 CD_{13}	Nantou	February 6, 2007	Lulin Observatory	Q. Ye, Lin, H.-C.	·	2.3 km	MPC · JPL
160494	2007 CG_{20}	—	February 6, 2007	Palomar	NEAT	·	3.1 km	MPC · JPL
160495	2007 CG_{24}	—	February 8, 2007	Catalina	CSS	KON	4.0 km	MPC · JPL
160496	2007 CE_{55}	—	February 10, 2007	Catalina	CSS	LUT	6.3 km	MPC · JPL
160497	2007 CH_{56}	—	February 15, 2007	Catalina	CSS	ADE	2.7 km	MPC · JPL
160498	2007 CO_{56}	—	February 15, 2007	Catalina	CSS	·	950 m	MPC · JPL
160499	2007 DZ_{6}	—	February 16, 2007	Catalina	CSS	·	1.5 km	MPC · JPL
160500	2007 DC_{32}	—	February 17, 2007	Kitt Peak	Spacewatch	NYS	1.1 km	MPC · JPL

== 160501–160600 ==
back to top

Designation			Discovery			Properties		Ref
Permanent	Provisional	Named after	Date	Site	Discoverer(s)	Category	Diam.	Ref
160501	2007 EC_{166}	—	March 10, 2007	Socorro	LINEAR	·	2.3 km	MPC · JPL
160502	2007 FY_{27}	—	March 20, 2007	Mount Lemmon	Mount Lemmon Survey	MAR	1.4 km	MPC · JPL
160503	2007 HX_{17}	—	April 16, 2007	Catalina	CSS	·	3.9 km	MPC · JPL
160504	2007 HX_{37}	—	April 20, 2007	Kitt Peak	Spacewatch	·	810 m	MPC · JPL
160505	2007 JN_{16}	—	May 11, 2007	Tiki	S. F. Hönig, Teamo, N.	·	2.0 km	MPC · JPL
160506	2007 JP_{22}	—	May 11, 2007	Kitt Peak	Spacewatch	·	4.1 km	MPC · JPL
160507	3204 T-3	—	October 16, 1977	Palomar	C. J. van Houten, I. van Houten-Groeneveld, T. Gehrels	NYS	1.9 km	MPC · JPL
160508	4319 T-3	—	October 16, 1977	Palomar	C. J. van Houten, I. van Houten-Groeneveld, T. Gehrels	·	1.3 km	MPC · JPL
160509	1990 EG_{5}	—	March 4, 1990	Siding Spring	R. H. McNaught	·	6.3 km	MPC · JPL
160510	1990 RG_{1}	—	September 14, 1990	Palomar	H. E. Holt	·	1.8 km	MPC · JPL
160511	1990 SD_{11}	—	September 16, 1990	Palomar	H. E. Holt	·	5.0 km	MPC · JPL
160512 Franck-Hertz	1990 TE_{11}	Franck-Hertz	October 11, 1990	Tautenburg Observatory	F. Börngen, L. D. Schmadel	·	2.1 km	MPC · JPL
160513	1990 TD_{13}	—	October 12, 1990	Tautenburg Observatory	F. Börngen, L. D. Schmadel	·	2.5 km	MPC · JPL
160514	1991 PQ_{9}	—	August 7, 1991	Palomar	H. E. Holt	·	6.6 km	MPC · JPL
160515	1993 RP_{13}	—	September 14, 1993	La Silla	H. Debehogne, E. W. Elst	·	1.3 km	MPC · JPL
160516	1994 PC_{32}	—	August 12, 1994	La Silla	E. W. Elst	·	2.4 km	MPC · JPL
160517	1994 TB_{4}	—	October 2, 1994	Kitt Peak	Spacewatch	·	3.3 km	MPC · JPL
160518	1994 VM_{3}	—	November 1, 1994	Kitt Peak	Spacewatch	·	1.2 km	MPC · JPL
160519	1995 CS_{3}	—	February 1, 1995	Kitt Peak	Spacewatch	·	1.4 km	MPC · JPL
160520	1995 GM_{2}	—	April 2, 1995	Kitt Peak	Spacewatch	NYS	1.9 km	MPC · JPL
160521	1995 KU	—	May 21, 1995	Xinglong	SCAP	·	2.5 km	MPC · JPL
160522	1995 SZ_{30}	—	September 20, 1995	Kitt Peak	Spacewatch	·	2.8 km	MPC · JPL
160523	1995 SN_{40}	—	September 25, 1995	Kitt Peak	Spacewatch	·	2.0 km	MPC · JPL
160524	1996 BF_{7}	—	January 19, 1996	Kitt Peak	Spacewatch	·	2.4 km	MPC · JPL
160525	1996 EW_{10}	—	March 12, 1996	Kitt Peak	Spacewatch	·	1.4 km	MPC · JPL
160526	1996 RZ_{4}	—	September 13, 1996	Church Stretton	S. P. Laurie	·	2.4 km	MPC · JPL
160527	1996 RE_{31}	—	September 13, 1996	La Silla	Uppsala-DLR Trojan Survey	L4	20 km	MPC · JPL
160528	1996 RD_{32}	—	September 14, 1996	La Silla	Uppsala-DLR Trojan Survey	L4	14 km	MPC · JPL
160529	1996 TN_{1}	—	October 6, 1996	Rand	G. R. Viscome	V	1.7 km	MPC · JPL
160530	1996 TE_{16}	—	October 4, 1996	Kitt Peak	Spacewatch	·	3.3 km	MPC · JPL
160531	1996 TB_{49}	—	October 4, 1996	La Silla	E. W. Elst	·	7.1 km	MPC · JPL
160532	1996 TH_{50}	—	October 4, 1996	La Silla	E. W. Elst	·	2.2 km	MPC · JPL
160533	1996 TT_{56}	—	October 2, 1996	La Silla	E. W. Elst	L4	20 km	MPC · JPL
160534	1996 TA_{58}	—	October 2, 1996	La Silla	E. W. Elst	L4	17 km	MPC · JPL
160535	1996 TC_{64}	—	October 6, 1996	La Silla	E. W. Elst	·	3.6 km	MPC · JPL
160536	1996 UZ_{2}	—	October 18, 1996	Kitt Peak	Spacewatch	·	3.0 km	MPC · JPL
160537	1996 XD_{17}	—	December 4, 1996	Kitt Peak	Spacewatch	·	2.3 km	MPC · JPL
160538	1997 CG_{10}	—	February 2, 1997	Kitt Peak	Spacewatch	EUN	1.9 km	MPC · JPL
160539	1997 SG	—	September 20, 1997	Kleť	Kleť	·	1.7 km	MPC · JPL
160540	1997 WB_{58}	—	November 30, 1997	La Silla	Uppsala-DLR Trojan Survey	·	2.1 km	MPC · JPL
160541	1997 WM_{58}	—	November 26, 1997	La Silla	Uppsala-DLR Trojan Survey	·	1.9 km	MPC · JPL
160542	1998 FG_{47}	—	March 20, 1998	Socorro	LINEAR	·	1.2 km	MPC · JPL
160543	1998 GW_{8}	—	April 2, 1998	Socorro	LINEAR	EUN	2.5 km	MPC · JPL
160544	1998 HV_{5}	—	April 21, 1998	Caussols	ODAS	·	3.1 km	MPC · JPL
160545	1998 KA_{11}	—	May 22, 1998	Kitt Peak	Spacewatch	·	3.7 km	MPC · JPL
160546	1998 MD_{3}	—	June 18, 1998	Kitt Peak	Spacewatch	·	2.4 km	MPC · JPL
160547	1998 MG_{17}	—	June 27, 1998	Kitt Peak	Spacewatch	·	4.7 km	MPC · JPL
160548	1998 OW_{3}	—	July 24, 1998	Caussols	ODAS	AEO	1.5 km	MPC · JPL
160549	1998 QP_{20}	—	August 17, 1998	Socorro	LINEAR	·	4.6 km	MPC · JPL
160550	1998 QM_{36}	—	August 17, 1998	Socorro	LINEAR	·	5.5 km	MPC · JPL
160551	1998 QA_{45}	—	August 17, 1998	Socorro	LINEAR	(18466)	4.5 km	MPC · JPL
160552	1998 QB_{71}	—	August 24, 1998	Socorro	LINEAR	·	2.9 km	MPC · JPL
160553	1998 QQ_{82}	—	August 24, 1998	Socorro	LINEAR	·	4.5 km	MPC · JPL
160554	1998 QJ_{87}	—	August 24, 1998	Socorro	LINEAR	·	5.8 km	MPC · JPL
160555	1998 RB_{1}	—	September 12, 1998	Oizumi	T. Kobayashi	·	5.1 km	MPC · JPL
160556 Greenaugh	1998 RR_{4}	Greenaugh	September 14, 1998	Socorro	LINEAR	·	3.2 km	MPC · JPL
160557	1998 RT_{18}	—	September 14, 1998	Socorro	LINEAR	·	4.4 km	MPC · JPL
160558	1998 RL_{51}	—	September 14, 1998	Socorro	LINEAR	·	3.1 km	MPC · JPL
160559	1998 RS_{55}	—	September 14, 1998	Socorro	LINEAR	·	5.7 km	MPC · JPL
160560	1998 SZ_{6}	—	September 20, 1998	Kitt Peak	Spacewatch	·	3.9 km	MPC · JPL
160561	1998 SR_{12}	—	September 23, 1998	Catalina	CSS	·	5.3 km	MPC · JPL
160562	1998 SO_{74}	—	September 21, 1998	La Silla	E. W. Elst	·	3.4 km	MPC · JPL
160563	1998 SC_{82}	—	September 26, 1998	Socorro	LINEAR	·	3.5 km	MPC · JPL
160564	1998 SL_{88}	—	September 26, 1998	Socorro	LINEAR	·	4.2 km	MPC · JPL
160565	1998 SW_{99}	—	September 26, 1998	Socorro	LINEAR	·	1.3 km	MPC · JPL
160566	1998 SO_{156}	—	September 26, 1998	Socorro	LINEAR	DOR	4.6 km	MPC · JPL
160567	1998 TP_{36}	—	October 12, 1998	Kitt Peak	Spacewatch	·	5.1 km	MPC · JPL
160568	1998 UB_{35}	—	October 28, 1998	Socorro	LINEAR	·	6.6 km	MPC · JPL
160569	1998 VD_{1}	—	November 10, 1998	Socorro	LINEAR	·	6.4 km	MPC · JPL
160570	1998 VQ_{51}	—	November 13, 1998	Socorro	LINEAR	·	3.7 km	MPC · JPL
160571	1998 WG_{10}	—	November 21, 1998	Socorro	LINEAR	·	4.1 km	MPC · JPL
160572	1999 CM_{46}	—	February 10, 1999	Socorro	LINEAR	slow	4.5 km	MPC · JPL
160573	1999 CS_{142}	—	February 10, 1999	Kitt Peak	Spacewatch	·	940 m	MPC · JPL
160574	1999 EH_{11}	—	March 15, 1999	Kitt Peak	Spacewatch	·	1.3 km	MPC · JPL
160575 Manuelblasco	1999 GQ_{6}	Manuelblasco	April 13, 1999	Majorca	OAM	·	1.5 km	MPC · JPL
160576	1999 HB_{7}	—	April 19, 1999	Kitt Peak	Spacewatch	NYS	2.3 km	MPC · JPL
160577	1999 JL_{48}	—	May 10, 1999	Socorro	LINEAR	·	3.3 km	MPC · JPL
160578	1999 JJ_{90}	—	May 12, 1999	Socorro	LINEAR	·	4.6 km	MPC · JPL
160579	1999 JG_{136}	—	May 7, 1999	Catalina	CSS	·	3.1 km	MPC · JPL
160580	1999 KG	—	May 16, 1999	Kitt Peak	Spacewatch	EUN	2.2 km	MPC · JPL
160581	1999 KH_{12}	—	May 18, 1999	Socorro	LINEAR	·	5.2 km	MPC · JPL
160582	1999 NY_{3}	—	July 13, 1999	Socorro	LINEAR	·	3.0 km	MPC · JPL
160583	1999 NN_{15}	—	July 14, 1999	Socorro	LINEAR	·	3.1 km	MPC · JPL
160584	1999 ND_{65}	—	July 14, 1999	Socorro	LINEAR	·	2.5 km	MPC · JPL
160585	1999 RK_{2}	—	September 5, 1999	Kitt Peak	Spacewatch	·	1.6 km	MPC · JPL
160586	1999 RG_{7}	—	September 3, 1999	Kitt Peak	Spacewatch	EUN	1.9 km	MPC · JPL
160587	1999 RG_{15}	—	September 7, 1999	Socorro	LINEAR	·	2.5 km	MPC · JPL
160588	1999 RG_{17}	—	September 7, 1999	Socorro	LINEAR	KON	3.6 km	MPC · JPL
160589	1999 RU_{25}	—	September 7, 1999	Socorro	LINEAR	·	2.6 km	MPC · JPL
160590	1999 RE_{28}	—	September 8, 1999	Fountain Hills	C. W. Juels	·	1.8 km	MPC · JPL
160591	1999 RD_{81}	—	September 7, 1999	Socorro	LINEAR	(5)	1.7 km	MPC · JPL
160592	1999 RF_{86}	—	September 7, 1999	Socorro	LINEAR	·	2.1 km	MPC · JPL
160593	1999 RL_{100}	—	September 8, 1999	Socorro	LINEAR	·	1.6 km	MPC · JPL
160594	1999 RX_{135}	—	September 9, 1999	Socorro	LINEAR	·	2.2 km	MPC · JPL
160595	1999 RC_{143}	—	September 9, 1999	Socorro	LINEAR	·	1.8 km	MPC · JPL
160596	1999 RT_{152}	—	September 9, 1999	Socorro	LINEAR	·	2.9 km	MPC · JPL
160597	1999 RQ_{159}	—	September 9, 1999	Socorro	LINEAR	·	1.5 km	MPC · JPL
160598	1999 RP_{162}	—	September 9, 1999	Socorro	LINEAR	(5)	2.0 km	MPC · JPL
160599	1999 RX_{166}	—	September 9, 1999	Socorro	LINEAR	·	3.7 km	MPC · JPL
160600	1999 RV_{210}	—	September 8, 1999	Socorro	LINEAR	MAR	3.8 km	MPC · JPL

== 160601–160700 ==
back to top

Designation			Discovery			Properties		Ref
Permanent	Provisional	Named after	Date	Site	Discoverer(s)	Category	Diam.	Ref
160601	1999 RO_{234}	—	September 8, 1999	Catalina	CSS	·	5.0 km	MPC · JPL
160602	1999 RX_{252}	—	September 8, 1999	Socorro	LINEAR	BRG	2.6 km	MPC · JPL
160603	1999 SA_{15}	—	September 29, 1999	Catalina	CSS	·	1.8 km	MPC · JPL
160604	1999 TD_{11}	—	October 8, 1999	Monte Agliale	S. Donati	·	2.8 km	MPC · JPL
160605	1999 TT_{12}	—	October 12, 1999	Kleť	Kleť	·	2.7 km	MPC · JPL
160606	1999 TW_{25}	—	October 3, 1999	Socorro	LINEAR	·	1.9 km	MPC · JPL
160607	1999 TY_{27}	—	October 3, 1999	Socorro	LINEAR	·	2.6 km	MPC · JPL
160608	1999 TX_{29}	—	October 4, 1999	Socorro	LINEAR	(5)	1.9 km	MPC · JPL
160609	1999 TA_{35}	—	October 3, 1999	Socorro	LINEAR	H	1.3 km	MPC · JPL
160610	1999 TO_{46}	—	October 4, 1999	Kitt Peak	Spacewatch	·	1.5 km	MPC · JPL
160611	1999 TP_{47}	—	October 4, 1999	Kitt Peak	Spacewatch	V	720 m	MPC · JPL
160612	1999 TF_{67}	—	October 8, 1999	Kitt Peak	Spacewatch	·	1.6 km	MPC · JPL
160613	1999 TA_{68}	—	October 8, 1999	Kitt Peak	Spacewatch	THM	3.6 km	MPC · JPL
160614	1999 TW_{82}	—	October 12, 1999	Kitt Peak	Spacewatch	·	1.4 km	MPC · JPL
160615	1999 TG_{97}	—	October 2, 1999	Socorro	LINEAR	·	3.7 km	MPC · JPL
160616	1999 TR_{97}	—	October 2, 1999	Socorro	LINEAR	·	2.5 km	MPC · JPL
160617	1999 TF_{99}	—	October 2, 1999	Socorro	LINEAR	·	2.1 km	MPC · JPL
160618	1999 TV_{103}	—	October 3, 1999	Socorro	LINEAR	(5)	1.8 km	MPC · JPL
160619	1999 TH_{106}	—	October 4, 1999	Socorro	LINEAR	·	3.1 km	MPC · JPL
160620	1999 TS_{114}	—	October 4, 1999	Socorro	LINEAR	·	2.2 km	MPC · JPL
160621	1999 TK_{120}	—	October 4, 1999	Socorro	LINEAR	(5)	1.9 km	MPC · JPL
160622	1999 TF_{144}	—	October 7, 1999	Socorro	LINEAR	EUN	2.2 km	MPC · JPL
160623	1999 TX_{195}	—	October 12, 1999	Socorro	LINEAR	·	2.5 km	MPC · JPL
160624	1999 TD_{197}	—	October 12, 1999	Socorro	LINEAR	·	3.2 km	MPC · JPL
160625	1999 TP_{241}	—	October 4, 1999	Catalina	CSS	·	1.4 km	MPC · JPL
160626	1999 TE_{271}	—	October 3, 1999	Socorro	LINEAR	·	1.3 km	MPC · JPL
160627	1999 TQ_{295}	—	October 1, 1999	Catalina	CSS	·	2.1 km	MPC · JPL
160628	1999 UU_{29}	—	October 31, 1999	Kitt Peak	Spacewatch	(5)	2.0 km	MPC · JPL
160629	1999 UQ_{45}	—	October 31, 1999	Catalina	CSS	(5)	2.2 km	MPC · JPL
160630	1999 VU_{26}	—	November 3, 1999	Socorro	LINEAR	·	2.1 km	MPC · JPL
160631	1999 VX_{29}	—	November 3, 1999	Socorro	LINEAR	·	2.6 km	MPC · JPL
160632	1999 VU_{45}	—	November 4, 1999	Catalina	CSS	·	2.4 km	MPC · JPL
160633	1999 VC_{46}	—	November 3, 1999	Socorro	LINEAR	H	980 m	MPC · JPL
160634	1999 VG_{58}	—	November 4, 1999	Socorro	LINEAR	·	3.1 km	MPC · JPL
160635	1999 VA_{83}	—	November 1, 1999	Kitt Peak	Spacewatch	H	1.1 km	MPC · JPL
160636	1999 VR_{83}	—	November 2, 1999	Kitt Peak	Spacewatch	EOS	4.1 km	MPC · JPL
160637	1999 VF_{88}	—	November 4, 1999	Socorro	LINEAR	(5)	1.9 km	MPC · JPL
160638	1999 VB_{109}	—	November 9, 1999	Socorro	LINEAR	·	2.3 km	MPC · JPL
160639	1999 VJ_{122}	—	November 4, 1999	Kitt Peak	Spacewatch	·	1.8 km	MPC · JPL
160640	1999 VN_{149}	—	November 14, 1999	Socorro	LINEAR	·	1.9 km	MPC · JPL
160641	1999 VB_{158}	—	November 14, 1999	Socorro	LINEAR	·	2.8 km	MPC · JPL
160642	1999 VD_{191}	—	November 9, 1999	Socorro	LINEAR	·	2.9 km	MPC · JPL
160643	1999 XQ_{6}	—	December 4, 1999	Catalina	CSS	(5)	2.5 km	MPC · JPL
160644	1999 XM_{11}	—	December 5, 1999	Catalina	CSS	(5)	2.6 km	MPC · JPL
160645	1999 XW_{43}	—	December 7, 1999	Socorro	LINEAR	·	5.4 km	MPC · JPL
160646	1999 XK_{44}	—	December 7, 1999	Socorro	LINEAR	·	2.6 km	MPC · JPL
160647	1999 XH_{69}	—	December 7, 1999	Socorro	LINEAR	·	2.4 km	MPC · JPL
160648	1999 XC_{71}	—	December 7, 1999	Socorro	LINEAR	·	5.5 km	MPC · JPL
160649	1999 XR_{74}	—	December 7, 1999	Socorro	LINEAR	·	2.5 km	MPC · JPL
160650	1999 XB_{75}	—	December 7, 1999	Socorro	LINEAR	·	2.3 km	MPC · JPL
160651	1999 XQ_{101}	—	December 7, 1999	Socorro	LINEAR	(5)	3.6 km	MPC · JPL
160652	1999 XB_{109}	—	December 4, 1999	Catalina	CSS	·	2.1 km	MPC · JPL
160653	1999 XY_{112}	—	December 11, 1999	Socorro	LINEAR	·	3.2 km	MPC · JPL
160654	1999 XQ_{113}	—	December 11, 1999	Socorro	LINEAR	·	2.8 km	MPC · JPL
160655	1999 XB_{114}	—	December 11, 1999	Socorro	LINEAR	MAR	2.3 km	MPC · JPL
160656	1999 XU_{116}	—	December 5, 1999	Catalina	CSS	(5)	2.7 km	MPC · JPL
160657	1999 XC_{142}	—	December 12, 1999	Socorro	LINEAR	H	1.2 km	MPC · JPL
160658	1999 XT_{153}	—	December 7, 1999	Socorro	LINEAR	·	5.2 km	MPC · JPL
160659	1999 XY_{156}	—	December 8, 1999	Socorro	LINEAR	·	2.7 km	MPC · JPL
160660	1999 XX_{204}	—	December 12, 1999	Socorro	LINEAR	(1547)	3.3 km	MPC · JPL
160661	1999 XD_{225}	—	December 13, 1999	Kitt Peak	Spacewatch	L4	13 km	MPC · JPL
160662	1999 XZ_{250}	—	December 5, 1999	Kitt Peak	Spacewatch	·	3.0 km	MPC · JPL
160663	1999 XK_{259}	—	December 9, 1999	Anderson Mesa	LONEOS	·	3.3 km	MPC · JPL
160664	2000 AE_{3}	—	January 2, 2000	Socorro	LINEAR	EUN	2.6 km	MPC · JPL
160665	2000 AB_{7}	—	January 2, 2000	Socorro	LINEAR	·	2.6 km	MPC · JPL
160666	2000 AW_{100}	—	January 5, 2000	Socorro	LINEAR	EUN	2.2 km	MPC · JPL
160667	2000 AY_{100}	—	January 5, 2000	Socorro	LINEAR	·	3.9 km	MPC · JPL
160668	2000 AQ_{155}	—	January 3, 2000	Socorro	LINEAR	·	2.4 km	MPC · JPL
160669	2000 AN_{171}	—	January 7, 2000	Socorro	LINEAR	·	2.7 km	MPC · JPL
160670	2000 AB_{215}	—	January 7, 2000	Kitt Peak	Spacewatch	V	1.3 km	MPC · JPL
160671	2000 AY_{237}	—	January 6, 2000	Socorro	LINEAR	·	1.7 km	MPC · JPL
160672	2000 BP_{11}	—	January 26, 2000	Kitt Peak	Spacewatch	·	1.4 km	MPC · JPL
160673	2000 BB_{35}	—	January 30, 2000	Socorro	LINEAR	·	2.9 km	MPC · JPL
160674	2000 CN_{32}	—	February 2, 2000	Socorro	LINEAR	EOS	2.9 km	MPC · JPL
160675	2000 CK_{47}	—	February 2, 2000	Socorro	LINEAR	·	2.5 km	MPC · JPL
160676	2000 CT_{55}	—	February 4, 2000	Socorro	LINEAR	·	4.6 km	MPC · JPL
160677	2000 CP_{81}	—	February 4, 2000	Socorro	LINEAR	·	3.8 km	MPC · JPL
160678	2000 CZ_{140}	—	February 6, 2000	Kitt Peak	Spacewatch	·	4.1 km	MPC · JPL
160679	2000 DB_{6}	—	February 28, 2000	Socorro	LINEAR	L4	20 km	MPC · JPL
160680	2000 DX_{11}	—	February 27, 2000	Kitt Peak	Spacewatch	·	4.0 km	MPC · JPL
160681	2000 DR_{23}	—	February 29, 2000	Socorro	LINEAR	·	4.3 km	MPC · JPL
160682	2000 DN_{39}	—	February 29, 2000	Socorro	LINEAR	EOS	3.8 km	MPC · JPL
160683	2000 DG_{79}	—	February 29, 2000	Socorro	LINEAR	·	4.0 km	MPC · JPL
160684	2000 EL_{10}	—	March 3, 2000	Socorro	LINEAR	·	1.5 km	MPC · JPL
160685	2000 EK_{92}	—	March 9, 2000	Socorro	LINEAR	·	4.1 km	MPC · JPL
160686	2000 EO_{155}	—	March 9, 2000	Socorro	LINEAR	EOS	3.6 km	MPC · JPL
160687	2000 EV_{164}	—	March 3, 2000	Socorro	LINEAR	·	4.6 km	MPC · JPL
160688	2000 GB_{7}	—	April 4, 2000	Socorro	LINEAR	·	1.8 km	MPC · JPL
160689	2000 GA_{41}	—	April 5, 2000	Socorro	LINEAR	EOS	4.2 km	MPC · JPL
160690	2000 HD_{7}	—	April 25, 2000	Kitt Peak	Spacewatch	·	2.8 km	MPC · JPL
160691	2000 HO_{13}	—	April 28, 2000	Socorro	LINEAR	·	1.9 km	MPC · JPL
160692	2000 HD_{17}	—	April 24, 2000	Kitt Peak	Spacewatch	·	1.0 km	MPC · JPL
160693	2000 HO_{55}	—	April 24, 2000	Anderson Mesa	LONEOS	·	1.2 km	MPC · JPL
160694	2000 JG_{71}	—	May 1, 2000	Anderson Mesa	LONEOS	·	3.6 km	MPC · JPL
160695	2000 KX_{13}	—	May 28, 2000	Socorro	LINEAR	·	1.2 km	MPC · JPL
160696	2000 KX_{28}	—	May 28, 2000	Socorro	LINEAR	·	1.8 km	MPC · JPL
160697	2000 LB_{15}	—	June 4, 2000	Ondřejov	L. Kotková	·	2.3 km	MPC · JPL
160698	2000 NJ_{26}	—	July 4, 2000	Anderson Mesa	LONEOS	·	1.6 km	MPC · JPL
160699	2000 ON_{14}	—	July 23, 2000	Socorro	LINEAR	V	1.2 km	MPC · JPL
160700	2000 OH_{15}	—	July 23, 2000	Socorro	LINEAR	(2076)	1.5 km	MPC · JPL

== 160701–160800 ==
back to top

Designation			Discovery			Properties		Ref
Permanent	Provisional	Named after	Date	Site	Discoverer(s)	Category	Diam.	Ref
160701	2000 OD_{50}	—	July 31, 2000	Socorro	LINEAR	·	2.0 km	MPC · JPL
160702	2000 PU_{2}	—	August 2, 2000	Socorro	LINEAR	·	1.5 km	MPC · JPL
160703	2000 PB_{19}	—	August 1, 2000	Socorro	LINEAR	·	1.1 km	MPC · JPL
160704	2000 PW_{27}	—	August 9, 2000	Socorro	LINEAR	PHO	2.5 km	MPC · JPL
160705	2000 QE_{4}	—	August 24, 2000	Socorro	LINEAR	·	2.0 km	MPC · JPL
160706	2000 QK_{4}	—	August 24, 2000	Socorro	LINEAR	·	1.4 km	MPC · JPL
160707	2000 QP_{10}	—	August 24, 2000	Socorro	LINEAR	·	1.4 km	MPC · JPL
160708	2000 QF_{20}	—	August 24, 2000	Socorro	LINEAR	·	2.0 km	MPC · JPL
160709	2000 QC_{30}	—	August 25, 2000	Socorro	LINEAR	·	2.3 km	MPC · JPL
160710	2000 QA_{52}	—	August 24, 2000	Socorro	LINEAR	·	1.5 km	MPC · JPL
160711	2000 QK_{73}	—	August 24, 2000	Socorro	LINEAR	·	2.7 km	MPC · JPL
160712	2000 QN_{85}	—	August 25, 2000	Socorro	LINEAR	V	1.3 km	MPC · JPL
160713	2000 QQ_{96}	—	August 28, 2000	Socorro	LINEAR	PHO	1.6 km	MPC · JPL
160714	2000 QO_{103}	—	August 28, 2000	Socorro	LINEAR	·	1.7 km	MPC · JPL
160715	2000 QG_{106}	—	August 28, 2000	Socorro	LINEAR	·	6.1 km	MPC · JPL
160716	2000 QG_{109}	—	August 29, 2000	Socorro	LINEAR	·	1.3 km	MPC · JPL
160717	2000 QS_{118}	—	August 25, 2000	Socorro	LINEAR	·	3.0 km	MPC · JPL
160718	2000 QP_{125}	—	August 31, 2000	Socorro	LINEAR	·	2.5 km	MPC · JPL
160719	2000 QO_{132}	—	August 26, 2000	Socorro	LINEAR	·	1.7 km	MPC · JPL
160720	2000 QM_{158}	—	August 31, 2000	Socorro	LINEAR	·	2.1 km	MPC · JPL
160721	2000 QB_{159}	—	August 31, 2000	Socorro	LINEAR	·	2.5 km	MPC · JPL
160722	2000 QY_{166}	—	August 31, 2000	Socorro	LINEAR	V	1.3 km	MPC · JPL
160723	2000 QL_{171}	—	August 31, 2000	Socorro	LINEAR	·	1.4 km	MPC · JPL
160724	2000 QM_{171}	—	August 31, 2000	Socorro	LINEAR	·	1.7 km	MPC · JPL
160725	2000 QV_{176}	—	August 31, 2000	Socorro	LINEAR	·	1.6 km	MPC · JPL
160726	2000 QS_{179}	—	August 31, 2000	Socorro	LINEAR	·	2.2 km	MPC · JPL
160727	2000 QG_{184}	—	August 26, 2000	Socorro	LINEAR	·	1.4 km	MPC · JPL
160728	2000 QG_{192}	—	August 26, 2000	Socorro	LINEAR	V	1.4 km	MPC · JPL
160729	2000 QC_{201}	—	August 29, 2000	Socorro	LINEAR	NYS	1.5 km	MPC · JPL
160730	2000 QQ_{209}	—	August 31, 2000	Socorro	LINEAR	·	2.5 km	MPC · JPL
160731	2000 QY_{230}	—	August 31, 2000	Kitt Peak	Spacewatch	·	1.9 km	MPC · JPL
160732	2000 RU_{17}	—	September 1, 2000	Socorro	LINEAR	·	1.9 km	MPC · JPL
160733	2000 RE_{22}	—	September 1, 2000	Socorro	LINEAR	·	3.1 km	MPC · JPL
160734	2000 RS_{23}	—	September 1, 2000	Socorro	LINEAR	fast?	3.0 km	MPC · JPL
160735	2000 RP_{27}	—	September 1, 2000	Socorro	LINEAR	·	2.7 km	MPC · JPL
160736	2000 RB_{32}	—	September 1, 2000	Socorro	LINEAR	V	1.4 km	MPC · JPL
160737	2000 RL_{34}	—	September 1, 2000	Socorro	LINEAR	·	1.7 km	MPC · JPL
160738	2000 RZ_{41}	—	September 3, 2000	Socorro	LINEAR	PHO	2.3 km	MPC · JPL
160739	2000 RB_{51}	—	September 5, 2000	Socorro	LINEAR	·	1.7 km	MPC · JPL
160740	2000 RW_{69}	—	September 2, 2000	Socorro	LINEAR	NYS	1.7 km	MPC · JPL
160741	2000 RE_{72}	—	September 2, 2000	Socorro	LINEAR	NYS	1.8 km	MPC · JPL
160742	2000 RT_{83}	—	September 1, 2000	Socorro	LINEAR	·	2.2 km	MPC · JPL
160743	2000 RU_{84}	—	September 2, 2000	Anderson Mesa	LONEOS	·	1.7 km	MPC · JPL
160744	2000 RO_{91}	—	September 3, 2000	Socorro	LINEAR	NYS	1.7 km	MPC · JPL
160745	2000 RW_{95}	—	September 4, 2000	Haleakala	NEAT	·	2.7 km	MPC · JPL
160746	2000 RD_{100}	—	September 5, 2000	Socorro	LINEAR	·	1.4 km	MPC · JPL
160747	2000 SR_{9}	—	September 23, 2000	Socorro	LINEAR	·	3.2 km	MPC · JPL
160748	2000 SM_{35}	—	September 24, 2000	Socorro	LINEAR	·	2.0 km	MPC · JPL
160749	2000 SZ_{74}	—	September 24, 2000	Socorro	LINEAR	·	1.4 km	MPC · JPL
160750	2000 SR_{78}	—	September 24, 2000	Socorro	LINEAR	·	2.3 km	MPC · JPL
160751	2000 SC_{83}	—	September 24, 2000	Socorro	LINEAR	·	1.4 km	MPC · JPL
160752	2000 SQ_{84}	—	September 24, 2000	Socorro	LINEAR	·	1.6 km	MPC · JPL
160753	2000 SW_{84}	—	September 24, 2000	Socorro	LINEAR	·	2.3 km	MPC · JPL
160754	2000 SM_{88}	—	September 24, 2000	Socorro	LINEAR	·	1.6 km	MPC · JPL
160755	2000 SE_{94}	—	September 23, 2000	Socorro	LINEAR	·	1.8 km	MPC · JPL
160756	2000 SE_{96}	—	September 23, 2000	Socorro	LINEAR	V	1.3 km	MPC · JPL
160757	2000 SU_{98}	—	September 23, 2000	Socorro	LINEAR	·	2.1 km	MPC · JPL
160758	2000 SM_{99}	—	September 23, 2000	Socorro	LINEAR	·	5.5 km	MPC · JPL
160759	2000 SV_{101}	—	September 24, 2000	Socorro	LINEAR	·	2.5 km	MPC · JPL
160760	2000 SV_{103}	—	September 24, 2000	Socorro	LINEAR	·	2.2 km	MPC · JPL
160761	2000 SE_{105}	—	September 24, 2000	Socorro	LINEAR	·	1.6 km	MPC · JPL
160762	2000 SL_{106}	—	September 24, 2000	Socorro	LINEAR	MAS	1.1 km	MPC · JPL
160763	2000 SJ_{108}	—	September 24, 2000	Socorro	LINEAR	·	3.0 km	MPC · JPL
160764	2000 SJ_{125}	—	September 24, 2000	Socorro	LINEAR	·	3.5 km	MPC · JPL
160765	2000 SK_{126}	—	September 24, 2000	Socorro	LINEAR	·	2.5 km	MPC · JPL
160766	2000 SY_{130}	—	September 22, 2000	Socorro	LINEAR	·	4.8 km	MPC · JPL
160767	2000 SS_{133}	—	September 23, 2000	Socorro	LINEAR	·	2.1 km	MPC · JPL
160768	2000 SQ_{137}	—	September 23, 2000	Socorro	LINEAR	·	1.4 km	MPC · JPL
160769	2000 SM_{152}	—	September 24, 2000	Socorro	LINEAR	·	1.8 km	MPC · JPL
160770	2000 SF_{188}	—	September 21, 2000	Haleakala	NEAT	·	2.6 km	MPC · JPL
160771	2000 SM_{195}	—	September 24, 2000	Socorro	LINEAR	·	3.0 km	MPC · JPL
160772	2000 SU_{199}	—	September 24, 2000	Socorro	LINEAR	·	1.6 km	MPC · JPL
160773	2000 SG_{206}	—	September 24, 2000	Socorro	LINEAR	MAS	1.1 km	MPC · JPL
160774	2000 SK_{217}	—	September 26, 2000	Socorro	LINEAR	·	3.5 km	MPC · JPL
160775	2000 SW_{234}	—	September 24, 2000	Socorro	LINEAR	·	4.3 km	MPC · JPL
160776	2000 SP_{241}	—	September 24, 2000	Socorro	LINEAR	·	1.5 km	MPC · JPL
160777	2000 SL_{243}	—	September 24, 2000	Socorro	LINEAR	·	1.3 km	MPC · JPL
160778	2000 SA_{250}	—	September 24, 2000	Socorro	LINEAR	·	2.6 km	MPC · JPL
160779	2000 SV_{257}	—	September 24, 2000	Socorro	LINEAR	·	1.4 km	MPC · JPL
160780	2000 SL_{267}	—	September 27, 2000	Socorro	LINEAR	NYS	1.9 km	MPC · JPL
160781	2000 SK_{277}	—	September 30, 2000	Socorro	LINEAR	·	2.3 km	MPC · JPL
160782	2000 SY_{284}	—	September 23, 2000	Socorro	LINEAR	·	2.9 km	MPC · JPL
160783	2000 SB_{292}	—	September 27, 2000	Socorro	LINEAR	·	2.0 km	MPC · JPL
160784	2000 SF_{326}	—	September 29, 2000	Kitt Peak	Spacewatch	·	3.6 km	MPC · JPL
160785	2000 SV_{337}	—	September 25, 2000	Haleakala	NEAT	NYS	1.4 km	MPC · JPL
160786	2000 SM_{356}	—	September 29, 2000	Anderson Mesa	LONEOS	PHO	2.7 km	MPC · JPL
160787	2000 SE_{361}	—	September 23, 2000	Anderson Mesa	LONEOS	·	1.6 km	MPC · JPL
160788	2000 TF_{21}	—	October 1, 2000	Socorro	LINEAR	·	2.0 km	MPC · JPL
160789	2000 TJ_{23}	—	October 1, 2000	Socorro	LINEAR	NYS	1.2 km	MPC · JPL
160790	2000 TP_{42}	—	October 1, 2000	Socorro	LINEAR	MAR	1.4 km	MPC · JPL
160791	2000 TF_{45}	—	October 1, 2000	Socorro	LINEAR	·	2.6 km	MPC · JPL
160792	2000 TS_{50}	—	October 1, 2000	Socorro	LINEAR	·	2.1 km	MPC · JPL
160793	2000 TN_{54}	—	October 1, 2000	Socorro	LINEAR	V	1.5 km	MPC · JPL
160794	2000 UC_{7}	—	October 24, 2000	Socorro	LINEAR	·	1.9 km	MPC · JPL
160795	2000 UA_{17}	—	October 24, 2000	Socorro	LINEAR	·	2.6 km	MPC · JPL
160796	2000 UL_{20}	—	October 24, 2000	Socorro	LINEAR	MAS	1.2 km	MPC · JPL
160797	2000 UM_{22}	—	October 24, 2000	Socorro	LINEAR	·	2.5 km	MPC · JPL
160798	2000 UH_{59}	—	October 25, 2000	Socorro	LINEAR	·	2.8 km	MPC · JPL
160799	2000 UN_{65}	—	October 25, 2000	Socorro	LINEAR	CLA	2.4 km	MPC · JPL
160800	2000 UF_{71}	—	October 25, 2000	Socorro	LINEAR	NYS	1.6 km	MPC · JPL

== 160801–160900 ==
back to top

Designation			Discovery			Properties		Ref
Permanent	Provisional	Named after	Date	Site	Discoverer(s)	Category	Diam.	Ref
160801	2000 UP_{90}	—	October 24, 2000	Socorro	LINEAR	·	2.3 km	MPC · JPL
160802	2000 VP_{14}	—	November 1, 2000	Socorro	LINEAR	·	2.0 km	MPC · JPL
160803	2000 VF_{26}	—	November 1, 2000	Socorro	LINEAR	·	1.8 km	MPC · JPL
160804	2000 VQ_{28}	—	November 1, 2000	Socorro	LINEAR	slow	2.5 km	MPC · JPL
160805	2000 VQ_{32}	—	November 1, 2000	Socorro	LINEAR	NYS	1.9 km	MPC · JPL
160806	2000 VE_{42}	—	November 1, 2000	Socorro	LINEAR	NYS	1.5 km	MPC · JPL
160807	2000 VB_{44}	—	November 1, 2000	Socorro	LINEAR	·	3.1 km	MPC · JPL
160808	2000 VJ_{46}	—	November 3, 2000	Socorro	LINEAR	·	2.0 km	MPC · JPL
160809	2000 VJ_{51}	—	November 3, 2000	Socorro	LINEAR	·	2.0 km	MPC · JPL
160810	2000 VE_{54}	—	November 3, 2000	Socorro	LINEAR	·	2.6 km	MPC · JPL
160811	2000 VH_{55}	—	November 3, 2000	Socorro	LINEAR	·	3.3 km	MPC · JPL
160812	2000 WN_{3}	—	November 17, 2000	Socorro	LINEAR	·	2.5 km	MPC · JPL
160813	2000 WY_{14}	—	November 20, 2000	Socorro	LINEAR	·	2.6 km	MPC · JPL
160814	2000 WA_{42}	—	November 21, 2000	Socorro	LINEAR	·	2.6 km	MPC · JPL
160815	2000 WV_{43}	—	November 21, 2000	Socorro	LINEAR	·	3.6 km	MPC · JPL
160816	2000 WO_{69}	—	November 19, 2000	Socorro	LINEAR	·	2.1 km	MPC · JPL
160817	2000 WK_{72}	—	November 19, 2000	Socorro	LINEAR	H	2.3 km	MPC · JPL
160818	2000 WH_{95}	—	November 21, 2000	Socorro	LINEAR	·	2.5 km	MPC · JPL
160819	2000 WE_{122}	—	November 29, 2000	Socorro	LINEAR	·	2.1 km	MPC · JPL
160820	2000 WD_{125}	—	November 26, 2000	Socorro	LINEAR	·	1.8 km	MPC · JPL
160821	2000 WH_{133}	—	November 19, 2000	Socorro	LINEAR	V	1.3 km	MPC · JPL
160822	2000 WY_{149}	—	November 28, 2000	Kitt Peak	Spacewatch	·	1.8 km	MPC · JPL
160823	2000 WL_{180}	—	November 27, 2000	Socorro	LINEAR	ERI	3.0 km	MPC · JPL
160824	2000 WU_{180}	—	November 29, 2000	Socorro	LINEAR	V	1.2 km	MPC · JPL
160825	2000 WV_{196}	—	November 20, 2000	Socorro	LINEAR	V	1.9 km	MPC · JPL
160826	2000 XT_{4}	—	December 1, 2000	Socorro	LINEAR	T_{j} (2.96) · HIL	8.4 km	MPC · JPL
160827	2000 XA_{8}	—	December 1, 2000	Socorro	LINEAR	·	2.7 km	MPC · JPL
160828	2000 XP_{27}	—	December 4, 2000	Socorro	LINEAR	MAR	1.9 km	MPC · JPL
160829	2000 XU_{27}	—	December 4, 2000	Socorro	LINEAR	·	2.1 km	MPC · JPL
160830	2000 XJ_{30}	—	December 4, 2000	Socorro	LINEAR	·	3.3 km	MPC · JPL
160831	2000 XK_{39}	—	December 4, 2000	Socorro	LINEAR	·	3.4 km	MPC · JPL
160832	2000 YF_{12}	—	December 19, 2000	Haleakala	NEAT	PHO	2.5 km	MPC · JPL
160833	2000 YN_{14}	—	December 25, 2000	Kitt Peak	Spacewatch	·	4.1 km	MPC · JPL
160834	2000 YD_{51}	—	December 30, 2000	Socorro	LINEAR	·	3.0 km	MPC · JPL
160835	2000 YY_{56}	—	December 30, 2000	Socorro	LINEAR	·	2.8 km	MPC · JPL
160836	2000 YS_{68}	—	December 28, 2000	Socorro	LINEAR	DOR	5.8 km	MPC · JPL
160837	2000 YQ_{70}	—	December 30, 2000	Socorro	LINEAR	·	2.4 km	MPC · JPL
160838	2000 YF_{79}	—	December 30, 2000	Socorro	LINEAR	·	2.0 km	MPC · JPL
160839	2000 YG_{97}	—	December 30, 2000	Socorro	LINEAR	EUN	5.2 km	MPC · JPL
160840	2000 YG_{113}	—	December 30, 2000	Socorro	LINEAR	NYS	2.3 km	MPC · JPL
160841	2000 YX_{117}	—	December 30, 2000	Socorro	LINEAR	·	3.3 km	MPC · JPL
160842	2000 YE_{142}	—	December 21, 2000	Kitt Peak	Deep Lens Survey	EOS	3.0 km	MPC · JPL
160843	2001 AC_{41}	—	January 3, 2001	Socorro	LINEAR	·	2.9 km	MPC · JPL
160844	2001 AB_{47}	—	January 15, 2001	Socorro	LINEAR	·	5.3 km	MPC · JPL
160845	2001 AS_{48}	—	January 4, 2001	Socorro	LINEAR	H	890 m	MPC · JPL
160846	2001 BV_{56}	—	January 19, 2001	Socorro	LINEAR	·	1.7 km	MPC · JPL
160847	2001 BD_{68}	—	January 31, 2001	Socorro	LINEAR	H	1.3 km	MPC · JPL
160848	2001 BN_{82}	—	January 19, 2001	Mauna Kea	D. J. Tholen	·	1.2 km	MPC · JPL
160849	2001 CH_{15}	—	February 1, 2001	Socorro	LINEAR	·	2.5 km	MPC · JPL
160850	2001 CB_{20}	—	February 2, 2001	Socorro	LINEAR	H	1.0 km	MPC · JPL
160851	2001 CX_{43}	—	February 15, 2001	Socorro	LINEAR	H	1.1 km	MPC · JPL
160852	2001 CT_{44}	—	February 15, 2001	Socorro	LINEAR	WAT	3.8 km	MPC · JPL
160853	2001 DA_{11}	—	February 17, 2001	Socorro	LINEAR	·	2.6 km	MPC · JPL
160854	2001 DV_{25}	—	February 17, 2001	Socorro	LINEAR	·	2.6 km	MPC · JPL
160855	2001 DH_{81}	—	February 26, 2001	Oizumi	T. Kobayashi	EUN	3.2 km	MPC · JPL
160856	2001 DU_{92}	—	February 19, 2001	Anderson Mesa	LONEOS	L4 · (8060)	16 km	MPC · JPL
160857	2001 EU_{21}	—	March 15, 2001	Anderson Mesa	LONEOS	·	4.4 km	MPC · JPL
160858	2001 FA_{121}	—	March 26, 2001	Socorro	LINEAR	·	4.0 km	MPC · JPL
160859	2001 FH_{122}	—	March 23, 2001	Anderson Mesa	LONEOS	·	4.2 km	MPC · JPL
160860	2001 FV_{142}	—	March 23, 2001	Haleakala	NEAT	·	3.2 km	MPC · JPL
160861	2001 FE_{186}	—	March 16, 2001	Socorro	LINEAR	·	4.9 km	MPC · JPL
160862	2001 GD_{5}	—	April 15, 2001	Socorro	LINEAR	·	5.2 km	MPC · JPL
160863	2001 HG_{20}	—	April 26, 2001	Socorro	LINEAR	·	4.6 km	MPC · JPL
160864	2001 HG_{51}	—	April 23, 2001	Socorro	LINEAR	V	1.3 km	MPC · JPL
160865	2001 JK_{2}	—	May 15, 2001	Kitt Peak	Spacewatch	TEL	2.4 km	MPC · JPL
160866	2001 KM_{11}	—	May 18, 2001	Socorro	LINEAR	·	4.7 km	MPC · JPL
160867	2001 KS_{25}	—	May 17, 2001	Socorro	LINEAR	·	1.1 km	MPC · JPL
160868	2001 KS_{32}	—	May 24, 2001	Kitt Peak	Spacewatch	·	2.1 km	MPC · JPL
160869	2001 KM_{39}	—	May 22, 2001	Socorro	LINEAR	T_{j} (2.96)	8.8 km	MPC · JPL
160870	2001 KU_{55}	—	May 22, 2001	Socorro	LINEAR	LIX	7.3 km	MPC · JPL
160871	2001 KM_{66}	—	May 22, 2001	Socorro	LINEAR	·	6.8 km	MPC · JPL
160872	2001 NS_{6}	—	July 11, 2001	Palomar	NEAT	JUN	2.1 km	MPC · JPL
160873	2001 NE_{14}	—	July 14, 2001	Palomar	NEAT	·	7.3 km	MPC · JPL
160874	2001 NQ_{18}	—	July 12, 2001	Haleakala	NEAT	·	9.2 km	MPC · JPL
160875	2001 OQ_{21}	—	July 21, 2001	Anderson Mesa	LONEOS	CYB	8.2 km	MPC · JPL
160876	2001 ON_{66}	—	July 23, 2001	Palomar	NEAT	·	3.4 km	MPC · JPL
160877	2001 OP_{77}	—	July 26, 2001	Palomar	NEAT	EUP	8.4 km	MPC · JPL
160878	2001 OO_{82}	—	July 27, 2001	Palomar	NEAT	·	9.3 km	MPC · JPL
160879	2001 OC_{100}	—	July 27, 2001	Anderson Mesa	LONEOS	·	1.6 km	MPC · JPL
160880	2001 PJ_{10}	—	August 8, 2001	Haleakala	NEAT	·	8.0 km	MPC · JPL
160881	2001 PJ_{12}	—	August 12, 2001	Palomar	NEAT	·	6.8 km	MPC · JPL
160882	2001 PC_{29}	—	August 15, 2001	Badlands	Badlands	HYG	5.9 km	MPC · JPL
160883	2001 QW_{2}	—	August 16, 2001	Socorro	LINEAR	(5931)	9.1 km	MPC · JPL
160884	2001 QT_{39}	—	August 16, 2001	Socorro	LINEAR	HYG	6.3 km	MPC · JPL
160885	2001 QF_{110}	—	August 24, 2001	Palomar	NEAT	·	2.4 km	MPC · JPL
160886	2001 QB_{135}	—	August 22, 2001	Socorro	LINEAR	·	1.8 km	MPC · JPL
160887	2001 QD_{223}	—	August 24, 2001	Anderson Mesa	LONEOS	THM	4.3 km	MPC · JPL
160888	2001 QT_{258}	—	August 25, 2001	Socorro	LINEAR	SYL · CYB	6.6 km	MPC · JPL
160889	2001 QX_{279}	—	August 19, 2001	Socorro	LINEAR	V	1.2 km	MPC · JPL
160890	2001 QH_{282}	—	August 19, 2001	Anderson Mesa	LONEOS	CYB	8.7 km	MPC · JPL
160891	2001 RU_{82}	—	September 11, 2001	Anderson Mesa	LONEOS	·	1.4 km	MPC · JPL
160892	2001 RN_{112}	—	September 12, 2001	Socorro	LINEAR	·	2.1 km	MPC · JPL
160893	2001 RH_{116}	—	September 12, 2001	Socorro	LINEAR	·	1.1 km	MPC · JPL
160894	2001 SP_{87}	—	September 20, 2001	Socorro	LINEAR	·	1.8 km	MPC · JPL
160895	2001 SN_{107}	—	September 20, 2001	Socorro	LINEAR	·	1.4 km	MPC · JPL
160896	2001 SU_{199}	—	September 19, 2001	Socorro	LINEAR	·	1.4 km	MPC · JPL
160897	2001 SB_{257}	—	September 19, 2001	Socorro	LINEAR	·	1.5 km	MPC · JPL
160898	2001 SY_{262}	—	September 24, 2001	Socorro	LINEAR	H	670 m	MPC · JPL
160899	2001 SG_{287}	—	September 22, 2001	Palomar	NEAT	·	3.1 km	MPC · JPL
160900	2001 SZ_{306}	—	September 21, 2001	Socorro	LINEAR	·	1.9 km	MPC · JPL

== 160901–161000 ==
back to top

Designation			Discovery			Properties		Ref
Permanent	Provisional	Named after	Date	Site	Discoverer(s)	Category	Diam.	Ref
160901	2001 SJ_{339}	—	September 21, 2001	Socorro	LINEAR	·	1.7 km	MPC · JPL
160902	2001 SL_{342}	—	September 21, 2001	Anderson Mesa	LONEOS	·	3.8 km	MPC · JPL
160903 Shiokaze	2001 TO_{56}	Shiokaze	October 14, 2001	Kuma Kogen	A. Nakamura	·	1.8 km	MPC · JPL
160904	2001 TR_{102}	—	October 15, 2001	Socorro	LINEAR	·	1.6 km	MPC · JPL
160905	2001 TL_{206}	—	October 11, 2001	Palomar	NEAT	NYS	2.2 km	MPC · JPL
160906	2001 UB_{12}	—	October 23, 2001	Desert Eagle	W. K. Y. Yeung	·	1.4 km	MPC · JPL
160907	2001 UJ_{87}	—	October 18, 2001	Kitt Peak	Spacewatch	·	1.1 km	MPC · JPL
160908	2001 UM_{138}	—	October 23, 2001	Socorro	LINEAR	slow	1.1 km	MPC · JPL
160909	2001 UD_{217}	—	October 24, 2001	Socorro	LINEAR	·	2.6 km	MPC · JPL
160910	2001 VO_{6}	—	November 9, 2001	Socorro	LINEAR	AGN	2.0 km	MPC · JPL
160911	2001 VV_{54}	—	November 10, 2001	Socorro	LINEAR	·	1.2 km	MPC · JPL
160912	2001 WU_{27}	—	November 17, 2001	Socorro	LINEAR	·	1.3 km	MPC · JPL
160913	2001 WH_{47}	—	November 16, 2001	Palomar	NEAT	(883)	1.8 km	MPC · JPL
160914	2001 XE_{13}	—	December 9, 2001	Socorro	LINEAR	·	2.4 km	MPC · JPL
160915	2001 XO_{40}	—	December 9, 2001	Socorro	LINEAR	·	1.5 km	MPC · JPL
160916	2001 XB_{44}	—	December 9, 2001	Socorro	LINEAR	·	4.2 km	MPC · JPL
160917	2001 XA_{82}	—	December 11, 2001	Socorro	LINEAR	AEO	1.9 km	MPC · JPL
160918	2001 XB_{88}	—	December 14, 2001	Desert Eagle	W. K. Y. Yeung	·	5.3 km	MPC · JPL
160919	2001 XL_{101}	—	December 10, 2001	Socorro	LINEAR	·	1.4 km	MPC · JPL
160920	2001 XT_{109}	—	December 11, 2001	Socorro	LINEAR	·	5.7 km	MPC · JPL
160921	2001 XH_{115}	—	December 13, 2001	Socorro	LINEAR	·	1.8 km	MPC · JPL
160922	2001 XN_{117}	—	December 13, 2001	Socorro	LINEAR	·	1.8 km	MPC · JPL
160923	2001 XN_{135}	—	December 14, 2001	Socorro	LINEAR	(5)	4.1 km	MPC · JPL
160924	2001 XT_{140}	—	December 14, 2001	Socorro	LINEAR	·	1.2 km	MPC · JPL
160925	2001 XA_{157}	—	December 14, 2001	Socorro	LINEAR	·	1.5 km	MPC · JPL
160926	2001 XV_{172}	—	December 14, 2001	Socorro	LINEAR	·	2.8 km	MPC · JPL
160927	2001 XV_{193}	—	December 14, 2001	Socorro	LINEAR	·	1.4 km	MPC · JPL
160928	2001 XZ_{200}	—	December 15, 2001	Socorro	LINEAR	·	5.8 km	MPC · JPL
160929	2001 XW_{237}	—	December 15, 2001	Socorro	LINEAR	·	2.3 km	MPC · JPL
160930	2001 XF_{243}	—	December 14, 2001	Socorro	LINEAR	V	1.3 km	MPC · JPL
160931	2001 XE_{248}	—	December 14, 2001	Kitt Peak	Spacewatch	·	1.6 km	MPC · JPL
160932	2001 YO	—	December 16, 2001	Oaxaca	Roe, J. M.	·	1.5 km	MPC · JPL
160933	2001 YX_{26}	—	December 18, 2001	Socorro	LINEAR	·	2.2 km	MPC · JPL
160934	2001 YA_{63}	—	December 18, 2001	Socorro	LINEAR	·	1.7 km	MPC · JPL
160935	2001 YV_{68}	—	December 18, 2001	Socorro	LINEAR	·	1.8 km	MPC · JPL
160936	2001 YD_{84}	—	December 18, 2001	Socorro	LINEAR	·	1.6 km	MPC · JPL
160937	2001 YM_{84}	—	December 18, 2001	Socorro	LINEAR	·	3.1 km	MPC · JPL
160938	2001 YR_{104}	—	December 17, 2001	Socorro	LINEAR	NYS	2.4 km	MPC · JPL
160939	2002 AJ_{2}	—	January 3, 2002	Socorro	LINEAR	H	1.4 km	MPC · JPL
160940	2002 AK_{5}	—	January 9, 2002	Oizumi	T. Kobayashi	·	1.5 km	MPC · JPL
160941	2002 AM_{9}	—	January 11, 2002	Desert Eagle	W. K. Y. Yeung	·	5.5 km	MPC · JPL
160942	2002 AV_{33}	—	January 12, 2002	Kitt Peak	Spacewatch	MAS	1.6 km	MPC · JPL
160943	2002 AR_{34}	—	January 10, 2002	Palomar	NEAT	·	1.8 km	MPC · JPL
160944	2002 AY_{37}	—	January 9, 2002	Socorro	LINEAR	AGN	1.9 km	MPC · JPL
160945	2002 AD_{40}	—	January 9, 2002	Socorro	LINEAR	·	5.7 km	MPC · JPL
160946	2002 AA_{49}	—	January 9, 2002	Socorro	LINEAR	·	1.2 km	MPC · JPL
160947	2002 AX_{59}	—	January 9, 2002	Socorro	LINEAR	·	1.7 km	MPC · JPL
160948	2002 AT_{76}	—	January 8, 2002	Socorro	LINEAR	·	1.1 km	MPC · JPL
160949	2002 AD_{99}	—	January 8, 2002	Socorro	LINEAR	·	3.9 km	MPC · JPL
160950	2002 AK_{107}	—	January 9, 2002	Socorro	LINEAR	·	3.9 km	MPC · JPL
160951	2002 AR_{110}	—	January 9, 2002	Socorro	LINEAR	·	1.5 km	MPC · JPL
160952	2002 AG_{111}	—	January 9, 2002	Socorro	LINEAR	·	1.5 km	MPC · JPL
160953	2002 AA_{116}	—	January 9, 2002	Socorro	LINEAR	·	1.5 km	MPC · JPL
160954	2002 AF_{122}	—	January 9, 2002	Socorro	LINEAR	(2076)	1.7 km	MPC · JPL
160955	2002 AN_{126}	—	January 13, 2002	Socorro	LINEAR	·	1.4 km	MPC · JPL
160956	2002 AU_{129}	—	January 15, 2002	Kingsnake	J. V. McClusky	·	3.6 km	MPC · JPL
160957	2002 AD_{142}	—	January 13, 2002	Socorro	LINEAR	NYS	1.7 km	MPC · JPL
160958	2002 AS_{156}	—	January 13, 2002	Socorro	LINEAR	·	2.3 km	MPC · JPL
160959	2002 AZ_{159}	—	January 13, 2002	Socorro	LINEAR	·	2.5 km	MPC · JPL
160960	2002 AU_{162}	—	January 13, 2002	Socorro	LINEAR	(2076)	1.7 km	MPC · JPL
160961	2002 AW_{178}	—	January 14, 2002	Socorro	LINEAR	V	1.2 km	MPC · JPL
160962	2002 AA_{182}	—	January 5, 2002	Palomar	NEAT	·	3.1 km	MPC · JPL
160963	2002 AP_{182}	—	January 5, 2002	Palomar	NEAT	·	1.3 km	MPC · JPL
160964	2002 AY_{201}	—	January 8, 2002	Palomar	NEAT	·	1.3 km	MPC · JPL
160965	2002 BB_{5}	—	January 19, 2002	Anderson Mesa	LONEOS	·	2.6 km	MPC · JPL
160966	2002 BO_{7}	—	January 18, 2002	Socorro	LINEAR	ADE	3.6 km	MPC · JPL
160967	2002 BQ_{15}	—	January 19, 2002	Socorro	LINEAR	PHO	1.6 km	MPC · JPL
160968	2002 BP_{23}	—	January 23, 2002	Socorro	LINEAR	·	4.2 km	MPC · JPL
160969	2002 BV_{25}	—	January 23, 2002	Socorro	LINEAR	·	4.9 km	MPC · JPL
160970	2002 CX_{10}	—	February 6, 2002	Socorro	LINEAR	H	1.1 km	MPC · JPL
160971	2002 CM_{13}	—	February 8, 2002	Desert Eagle	W. K. Y. Yeung	·	4.0 km	MPC · JPL
160972	2002 CX_{23}	—	February 6, 2002	Palomar	NEAT	V	1.2 km	MPC · JPL
160973	2002 CO_{26}	—	February 6, 2002	Socorro	LINEAR	PHO	2.4 km	MPC · JPL
160974	2002 CL_{38}	—	February 7, 2002	Socorro	LINEAR	·	1.9 km	MPC · JPL
160975	2002 CO_{38}	—	February 7, 2002	Socorro	LINEAR	·	2.5 km	MPC · JPL
160976	2002 CV_{52}	—	February 7, 2002	Socorro	LINEAR	NYS	1.7 km	MPC · JPL
160977	2002 CH_{59}	—	February 12, 2002	Desert Eagle	W. K. Y. Yeung	·	3.5 km	MPC · JPL
160978	2002 CU_{60}	—	February 6, 2002	Socorro	LINEAR	PHO	4.2 km	MPC · JPL
160979	2002 CG_{67}	—	February 7, 2002	Socorro	LINEAR	V	1.1 km	MPC · JPL
160980	2002 CP_{70}	—	February 7, 2002	Socorro	LINEAR	·	3.1 km	MPC · JPL
160981	2002 CV_{74}	—	February 7, 2002	Socorro	LINEAR	·	3.1 km	MPC · JPL
160982	2002 CH_{85}	—	February 7, 2002	Socorro	LINEAR	·	2.4 km	MPC · JPL
160983	2002 CX_{96}	—	February 7, 2002	Socorro	LINEAR	·	1.7 km	MPC · JPL
160984	2002 CQ_{104}	—	February 7, 2002	Socorro	LINEAR	·	1.7 km	MPC · JPL
160985	2002 CK_{109}	—	February 7, 2002	Socorro	LINEAR	·	2.2 km	MPC · JPL
160986	2002 CX_{113}	—	February 8, 2002	Socorro	LINEAR	·	2.4 km	MPC · JPL
160987	2002 CV_{118}	—	February 6, 2002	Socorro	LINEAR	·	5.3 km	MPC · JPL
160988	2002 CK_{131}	—	February 7, 2002	Socorro	LINEAR	·	1.5 km	MPC · JPL
160989	2002 CY_{142}	—	February 9, 2002	Socorro	LINEAR	·	1.9 km	MPC · JPL
160990	2002 CF_{167}	—	February 8, 2002	Socorro	LINEAR	·	2.0 km	MPC · JPL
160991	2002 CP_{168}	—	February 8, 2002	Socorro	LINEAR	·	4.2 km	MPC · JPL
160992	2002 CE_{192}	—	February 10, 2002	Socorro	LINEAR	NYS	2.1 km	MPC · JPL
160993	2002 CR_{202}	—	February 10, 2002	Socorro	LINEAR	KOR	2.2 km	MPC · JPL
160994	2002 CS_{205}	—	February 10, 2002	Socorro	LINEAR	·	4.3 km	MPC · JPL
160995	2002 CN_{218}	—	February 10, 2002	Socorro	LINEAR	·	1.9 km	MPC · JPL
160996	2002 CE_{239}	—	February 11, 2002	Socorro	LINEAR	·	2.0 km	MPC · JPL
160997	2002 CO_{254}	—	February 5, 2002	Palomar	NEAT	·	2.7 km	MPC · JPL
160998	2002 CA_{255}	—	February 6, 2002	Goodricke-Pigott	Goodricke-Pigott	·	1.3 km	MPC · JPL
160999	2002 CS_{296}	—	February 10, 2002	Socorro	LINEAR	·	2.6 km	MPC · JPL
161000	2002 CZ_{302}	—	February 12, 2002	Socorro	LINEAR	NYS	2.0 km	MPC · JPL

back to top

== See also ==
- Meanings of minor-planet names: 160001–161000
