= Alborz (disambiguation) =

Alborz is a mountain range in Iran.

Alborz may also refer to:

== Places ==
- Alborz province, a province of Iran
- Alborz County, a county in Qazvin province, Iran
- Alborz, Markazi, a village in Markazi Province, Iran
- Alborz, Qom, a village in Qom Province, Iran

== Other uses ==
- Alborz, a frigate of the Islamic Republic of Iran Navy
- Alborz High School, a high school in Tehran
