= Şelli =

- Location within Azerbaijan
- Coordinates: 39°57′14.9″N 46°53′37.8″E
- Country: Azerbaijan
- District: Agdam

Population (2015)
  - Total: 201
- Time zone: UTC+4 (AZT)

Şelli (Shelli) is a village in the Agdam District of Azerbaijan.

== History ==
The village was captured by Armenian forces during the First Nagorno-Karabakh War and was administrated as part of the Askeran Province of the breakaway Republic of Artsakh by the name Ughtasar (Armenian: Ուղտասար). Most of the village was ruined following the Battle of Aghdam, but unlike the city and the surrounding villages of Agdam, the southwestern part of Shelli was populated before the 2020 Nagorno-Karabakh war. The village was returned to Azerbaijan as part of the 2020 Nagorno-Karabakh ceasefire agreement.
