= Meanings of minor-planet names: 159001–160000 =

As minor planet discoveries are confirmed, they are given a permanent number by the IAU's Minor Planet Center (MPC), and the discoverers can then submit names for them, following the IAU's naming conventions. The list below concerns those minor planets in the specified number-range that have received names, and explains the meanings of those names.

Official naming citations of newly named small Solar System bodies are approved and published in a bulletin by IAU's Working Group for Small Bodies Nomenclature (WGSBN). Before May 2021, citations were published in MPC's Minor Planet Circulars for many decades. Recent citations can also be found on the JPL Small-Body Database (SBDB). Until his death in 2016, German astronomer Lutz D. Schmadel compiled these citations into the Dictionary of Minor Planet Names (DMP) and regularly updated the collection.

Based on Paul Herget's The Names of the Minor Planets, Schmadel also researched the unclear origin of numerous asteroids, most of which had been named prior to World War II. This article incorporates text from this source, which is in the public domain: SBDB New namings may only be added to this list below after official publication as the preannouncement of names is condemned. The WGSBN publishes a comprehensive guideline for the naming rules of non-cometary small Solar System bodies.

== 159001–159100 ==
Named minor planet	Provisional	This minor planet was named for...	Ref · Catalog
159011 Radomyshl	2004 TX_{13}	Radomyshl, Ukraine	JPL · 159011
159013 Kyleturner	2004 TC_{21}	In memory of Kyle Walter Turner, of Missouri City, TX	JPL · 159013

== 159101–159200 ==
back to top

Named minor planet	Provisional	This minor planet was named for...	Ref · Catalog
159102 Sarahflanigan	2004 TU_{354}	Sarah H. Flanigan (born 1985) is a supervising engineer at the Johns Hopkins University Applied Physics Laboratory, who served as the Deputy Guidance and Control Lead for the New Horizons Mission to Pluto.	JPL · 159102
159164 La Cañada	2005 JC_{22}	Observatorio de La Cañada (La Cañada Observatory), Ávila, Spain, the discovery site	JPL · 159164
159181 Berdychiv	2005 US_{12}	Berdychiv, second most populous city in the Zhytomyr region in the northwest of Ukraine.	JPL · 159181

== 159201–159300 ==
back to top

Named minor planet	Provisional	This minor planet was named for...	Ref · Catalog
159215 Apan	2005 WS_{59}	APAN, an amateur astronomical association from Novara, Italy (Italian: Associazione Provinciale Astrofili Novaresi), that oversees the Suno Observatory, where this minor planet was discovered	JPL · 159215

== 159301–159400 ==
back to top

Named minor planet	Provisional	This minor planet was named for...	Ref · Catalog
159351 Leonpascal	2007 EB_{10}	Leon Pascal Kocher, grandchild of the discoverer	JPL · 159351

== 159401–159500 ==
back to top

Named minor planet	Provisional	This minor planet was named for...	Ref · Catalog
159409 Ratte	1999 OJ	Étienne-Hyacinthe de Ratte (1722–1805), French astronomer and mathematician from Montpellier	JPL · 159409

== 159501–159600 ==
back to top

Named minor planet	Provisional	This minor planet was named for...	Ref · Catalog
There are no named minor planets in this number range

== 159601–159700 ==
back to top

Named minor planet	Provisional	This minor planet was named for...	Ref · Catalog
159629 Brunszvik	2002 BT_{31}	Countess Teréz Brunszvik, the founder of the first nursery school in Hungary	JPL · 159629

== 159701–159800 ==
back to top

Named minor planet	Provisional	This minor planet was named for...	Ref · Catalog
159743 Kluk	2003 FW_{1}	Kluk, a Czech hill near the Kleť mountain, location of the Kleť Observatory where this minor planet was discovered	JPL · 159743
159776 Eduardoröhl	2003 JR_{17}	Eduardo Röhl (1891–1959), Venezuelan scientist, humanist and entrepreneur who initiated the creation of the Llano del Hato National Astronomical Observatory in 1952.	JPL · 159776
159778 Bobshelton	2003 MZ_{1}	Robert Shelton (born 1948), nineteenth president of the University of Arizona, chaired the Keck Telescope Board from 1997 to 2000, important contributor to the success of the SOAR Telescope in Chile and the Southern African Large Telescope (SALT) facility in South Africa	JPL · 159778
159799 Kralice	2003 RF_{14}	The Czech village of Kralice nad Oslavou. It is known for the printing house of the Unity of the Brethren (1578–1620).	JPL · 159799

== 159801–159900 ==
back to top

Named minor planet	Provisional	This minor planet was named for...	Ref · Catalog
159814 Saguaro	2003 SS_{217}	The Saguaro National Park located in a desert landscape to the east and west of Tucson protects the majestic giant saguaro (Carnegiea gigantea) as well as other cacti. The giant saguaro is the supreme symbol of the American Southwest.	JPL · 159814
159826 Knapp	2003 SF_{331}	Gillian R. Knapp (born 1944), Anglo-American astronomer and a Founding Mother of the Sloan Digital Sky Survey	JPL · 159826
159827 Keithmullen	2003 TD_{2}	Keith Mullen (born 1952), American vice president of the Huachuca Astronomy Club of Sierra Vista, Arizona (see 133753 Teresamullen)	JPL · 159827
159865 Silvialonso	2004 PX_{66}	Silvia Alonso Perez (born 1976), teacher of astrometry to many Spanish amateur astronomers	JPL · 159865

== 159901–160000 ==
back to top

Named minor planet	Provisional	This minor planet was named for...	Ref · Catalog
159902 Gladstone	2004 TY_{354}	George Randall Gladstone (born 1956), a Program Director for Research and Development at the Southwest Research Institute, who worked as a Co-Investigator and Atmospheres Team Lead for the New Horizons mission to Pluto.	JPL · 159902
159974 Badacsony	2006 BD_{141}	Badacsony, a region in western Hungary, located north of Lake Balaton	JPL · 159974
159999 Michaelgriffin	2006 EZ_{67}	Michael D. Griffin (born 1949) served as the Johns Hopkins University Applied Physics Laboratory Space Department Head and previously served as the NASA Administrator during the New Horizons Mission to Pluto.	JPL · 159999
160000 Lemmon	2006 GN_{18}	Sara Plummer Lemmon (1836–1923) was an American botanist. She is credited with discovery of many new species of plants, and the subgenus Plummera. Mount Lemmon, the highest peak in the Santa Catalina Mountains in Arizona is named for her.	IAU · 160000

back to top

Preceded by 158,001–159,000	Meanings of minor-planet names List of minor planets: 159,001–160,000	Succeeded by 160,001–161,000
