= Étienne-Hyacinthe de Ratte =

French astronomer and mathematician

Étienne-Hyacinthe de Ratte (1722, Montpellier – 15 August 1805) was an 18th-century French astronomer and mathematician.

De Ratte made some verses in his youth, but he soon turned away from his natural tastes to engage with ardor in the study of mathematics. At twenty-one, he was secretary of the Académie des sciences et lettres de Montpellier.

De Ratte also wrote a number of contributions to the Encyclopédie on physical issues such as froid, glace, gelée, etc.

Although Ratte pursued diverse scientific interests, he devoted himself mainly to astronomy. In this discipline, he made a large number of observations, such as the Venus transit on 6 June 1761. The minor planet 159409 Ratte, discovered at Pises Observatory in 1999, was named in his memory.

== Works (selection) ==
- 1743: Sur les pressions qui naissent du poids des parties supérieures d'un fluide en repos sur les inférieures et sur les pressions latérales des fluides dans des vases de différentes figures.
- Sur l'accroissement subit de la tige d'une espèce d'aloès, agave americana de Linné.
- Recherches sur la pesanteur dans un milieu, composé de petits tourbillons
- Histoire de l'Académie royale de Montpellier depuis son origine jusqu'aux événements de 1789.

== Sources ==
- Ferdinand Hoefer, Nouvelle Biographie générale, t. 41, Paris, Firmin-Didot, 1862, (p. 697–9).
- Pierre Larousse, Grand Dictionnaire universel du XIXe, vol. 13, Paris, Administration du grand Dictionnaire universel, (p. 730).
