= List of minor planets: 159001–160000 =

The following is a partial list of minor planets, running from minor-planet number 159001 through 160000, inclusive. The primary data for this and other partial lists is based on JPL's "Small-Body Orbital Elements" and data available from the Minor Planet Center. Critical list information is also provided by the MPC, unless otherwise specified from Lowell Observatory. A detailed description of the table's columns and additional sources are given on the main page including a complete list of every page in this series, and a statistical break-up on the dynamical classification of minor planets.

Also see the summary list of all named bodies in numerical and alphabetical order, and the corresponding naming citations for the number range of this particular list. New namings may only be added to this list after official publication, as the preannouncement of names is condemned by the Working Group for Small Bodies Nomenclature of the International Astronomical Union.

Near-Earth obj.	MBA (inner)	MBA (outer)	Centaur
Mars-crosser	MBA (middle)	Jupiter trojan	Trans-Neptunian obj.
Unclassified

== 159001–159100 ==
Designation			Discovery			Properties		Ref
Permanent	Provisional	Named after	Date	Site	Discoverer(s)	Category	Diam.	Ref
159001	2004 SL_{41}	—	September 17, 2004	Kitt Peak	Spacewatch	NYS	1.2 km	MPC · JPL
159002	2004 SJ_{42}	—	September 18, 2004	Socorro	LINEAR	·	2.0 km	MPC · JPL
159003	2004 SM_{50}	—	September 22, 2004	Socorro	LINEAR	·	2.5 km	MPC · JPL
159004	2004 SR_{52}	—	September 21, 2004	Socorro	LINEAR	·	2.5 km	MPC · JPL
159005	2004 SA_{54}	—	September 22, 2004	Socorro	LINEAR	PHO	1.5 km	MPC · JPL
159006	2004 SH_{54}	—	September 22, 2004	Socorro	LINEAR	·	1.6 km	MPC · JPL
159007	2004 TL_{1}	—	October 4, 2004	Goodricke-Pigott	R. A. Tucker	·	5.2 km	MPC · JPL
159008	2004 TC_{5}	—	October 4, 2004	Kitt Peak	Spacewatch	·	2.9 km	MPC · JPL
159009	2004 TT_{7}	—	October 5, 2004	Haleakala	NEAT	·	3.9 km	MPC · JPL
159010	2004 TX_{7}	—	October 3, 2004	Goodricke-Pigott	R. A. Tucker	·	3.0 km	MPC · JPL
159011 Radomyshl	2004 TX_{13}	Radomyshl	October 7, 2004	Andrushivka	Andrushivka	(194)	3.6 km	MPC · JPL
159012	2004 TT_{19}	—	October 13, 2004	Goodricke-Pigott	R. A. Tucker	·	1.8 km	MPC · JPL
159013 Kyleturner	2004 TC_{21}	Kyleturner	October 15, 2004	Needville	Wells, D.	·	3.2 km	MPC · JPL
159014	2004 TK_{24}	—	October 4, 2004	Kitt Peak	Spacewatch	·	3.3 km	MPC · JPL
159015	2004 TV_{27}	—	October 4, 2004	Kitt Peak	Spacewatch	AGN	1.5 km	MPC · JPL
159016	2004 TQ_{28}	—	October 4, 2004	Kitt Peak	Spacewatch	KOR	1.6 km	MPC · JPL
159017	2004 TY_{32}	—	October 4, 2004	Kitt Peak	Spacewatch	T_{j} (2.98)	5.5 km	MPC · JPL
159018	2004 TZ_{35}	—	October 4, 2004	Kitt Peak	Spacewatch	·	2.5 km	MPC · JPL
159019	2004 TF_{37}	—	October 4, 2004	Kitt Peak	Spacewatch	·	2.1 km	MPC · JPL
159020	2004 TN_{37}	—	October 4, 2004	Kitt Peak	Spacewatch	·	1.8 km	MPC · JPL
159021	2004 TN_{40}	—	October 4, 2004	Kitt Peak	Spacewatch	·	3.6 km	MPC · JPL
159022	2004 TP_{42}	—	October 4, 2004	Kitt Peak	Spacewatch	·	1.7 km	MPC · JPL
159023	2004 TN_{46}	—	October 4, 2004	Kitt Peak	Spacewatch	KOR	2.1 km	MPC · JPL
159024	2004 TA_{47}	—	October 4, 2004	Kitt Peak	Spacewatch	·	4.3 km	MPC · JPL
159025	2004 TQ_{48}	—	October 4, 2004	Kitt Peak	Spacewatch	·	1.8 km	MPC · JPL
159026	2004 TA_{54}	—	October 4, 2004	Kitt Peak	Spacewatch	·	2.5 km	MPC · JPL
159027	2004 TH_{54}	—	October 4, 2004	Kitt Peak	Spacewatch	·	3.4 km	MPC · JPL
159028	2004 TP_{55}	—	October 4, 2004	Kitt Peak	Spacewatch	·	3.3 km	MPC · JPL
159029	2004 TR_{55}	—	October 4, 2004	Kitt Peak	Spacewatch	MAR	2.1 km	MPC · JPL
159030	2004 TS_{60}	—	October 5, 2004	Anderson Mesa	LONEOS	·	3.5 km	MPC · JPL
159031	2004 TW_{66}	—	October 5, 2004	Anderson Mesa	LONEOS	·	2.2 km	MPC · JPL
159032	2004 TK_{67}	—	October 5, 2004	Anderson Mesa	LONEOS	·	2.7 km	MPC · JPL
159033	2004 TP_{68}	—	October 5, 2004	Anderson Mesa	LONEOS	·	2.3 km	MPC · JPL
159034	2004 TW_{68}	—	October 5, 2004	Anderson Mesa	LONEOS	·	2.6 km	MPC · JPL
159035	2004 TU_{74}	—	October 6, 2004	Kitt Peak	Spacewatch	·	1.7 km	MPC · JPL
159036	2004 TO_{76}	—	October 7, 2004	Socorro	LINEAR	KOR	2.1 km	MPC · JPL
159037	2004 TH_{77}	—	October 7, 2004	Anderson Mesa	LONEOS	·	3.1 km	MPC · JPL
159038	2004 TD_{85}	—	October 5, 2004	Kitt Peak	Spacewatch	·	2.1 km	MPC · JPL
159039	2004 TO_{93}	—	October 5, 2004	Kitt Peak	Spacewatch	THM	2.9 km	MPC · JPL
159040	2004 TB_{94}	—	October 5, 2004	Kitt Peak	Spacewatch	·	2.1 km	MPC · JPL
159041	2004 TO_{96}	—	October 5, 2004	Kitt Peak	Spacewatch	·	1.5 km	MPC · JPL
159042	2004 TU_{97}	—	October 5, 2004	Kitt Peak	Spacewatch	AST	3.2 km	MPC · JPL
159043	2004 TW_{97}	—	October 5, 2004	Kitt Peak	Spacewatch	KOR	2.3 km	MPC · JPL
159044	2004 TG_{112}	—	October 7, 2004	Kitt Peak	Spacewatch	·	3.3 km	MPC · JPL
159045	2004 TU_{115}	—	October 13, 2004	Goodricke-Pigott	Goodricke-Pigott	·	5.9 km	MPC · JPL
159046	2004 TZ_{117}	—	October 5, 2004	Anderson Mesa	LONEOS	·	2.8 km	MPC · JPL
159047	2004 TT_{120}	—	October 6, 2004	Palomar	NEAT	·	3.3 km	MPC · JPL
159048	2004 TY_{123}	—	October 7, 2004	Socorro	LINEAR	·	1.6 km	MPC · JPL
159049	2004 TH_{126}	—	October 7, 2004	Socorro	LINEAR	EOS	3.3 km	MPC · JPL
159050	2004 TO_{126}	—	October 7, 2004	Socorro	LINEAR	·	2.9 km	MPC · JPL
159051	2004 TB_{127}	—	October 7, 2004	Socorro	LINEAR	·	1.4 km	MPC · JPL
159052	2004 TR_{130}	—	October 7, 2004	Socorro	LINEAR	·	1.8 km	MPC · JPL
159053	2004 TQ_{133}	—	October 7, 2004	Anderson Mesa	LONEOS	RAF	1.9 km	MPC · JPL
159054	2004 TW_{139}	—	October 9, 2004	Anderson Mesa	LONEOS	·	4.4 km	MPC · JPL
159055	2004 TU_{143}	—	October 4, 2004	Kitt Peak	Spacewatch	·	3.3 km	MPC · JPL
159056	2004 TG_{144}	—	October 4, 2004	Kitt Peak	Spacewatch	·	4.0 km	MPC · JPL
159057	2004 TL_{144}	—	October 4, 2004	Kitt Peak	Spacewatch	·	3.2 km	MPC · JPL
159058	2004 TW_{144}	—	October 4, 2004	Kitt Peak	Spacewatch	·	5.6 km	MPC · JPL
159059	2004 TC_{146}	—	October 5, 2004	Kitt Peak	Spacewatch	·	2.7 km	MPC · JPL
159060	2004 TQ_{148}	—	October 6, 2004	Kitt Peak	Spacewatch	·	4.0 km	MPC · JPL
159061	2004 TM_{151}	—	October 6, 2004	Kitt Peak	Spacewatch	·	2.7 km	MPC · JPL
159062	2004 TO_{152}	—	October 6, 2004	Kitt Peak	Spacewatch	·	2.6 km	MPC · JPL
159063	2004 TJ_{168}	—	October 7, 2004	Socorro	LINEAR	·	3.2 km	MPC · JPL
159064	2004 TA_{171}	—	October 7, 2004	Socorro	LINEAR	·	3.4 km	MPC · JPL
159065	2004 TF_{171}	—	October 7, 2004	Socorro	LINEAR	EOS	3.3 km	MPC · JPL
159066	2004 TN_{177}	—	October 6, 2004	Kitt Peak	Spacewatch	·	3.5 km	MPC · JPL
159067	2004 TH_{191}	—	October 7, 2004	Kitt Peak	Spacewatch	·	1.4 km	MPC · JPL
159068	2004 TQ_{192}	—	October 7, 2004	Kitt Peak	Spacewatch	MAS	960 m	MPC · JPL
159069	2004 TD_{193}	—	October 7, 2004	Kitt Peak	Spacewatch	·	2.2 km	MPC · JPL
159070	2004 TC_{197}	—	October 7, 2004	Kitt Peak	Spacewatch	·	3.2 km	MPC · JPL
159071	2004 TU_{197}	—	October 7, 2004	Kitt Peak	Spacewatch	AGN	1.5 km	MPC · JPL
159072	2004 TM_{202}	—	October 7, 2004	Kitt Peak	Spacewatch	·	3.6 km	MPC · JPL
159073	2004 TP_{202}	—	October 7, 2004	Kitt Peak	Spacewatch	·	3.7 km	MPC · JPL
159074	2004 TX_{204}	—	October 7, 2004	Kitt Peak	Spacewatch	·	3.1 km	MPC · JPL
159075	2004 TO_{205}	—	October 7, 2004	Kitt Peak	Spacewatch	·	4.5 km	MPC · JPL
159076	2004 TT_{205}	—	October 7, 2004	Kitt Peak	Spacewatch	EOS	3.1 km	MPC · JPL
159077	2004 TU_{206}	—	October 7, 2004	Kitt Peak	Spacewatch	·	3.0 km	MPC · JPL
159078	2004 TM_{207}	—	October 7, 2004	Kitt Peak	Spacewatch	·	4.2 km	MPC · JPL
159079	2004 TC_{210}	—	October 8, 2004	Kitt Peak	Spacewatch	·	2.6 km	MPC · JPL
159080	2004 TG_{223}	—	October 7, 2004	Socorro	LINEAR	·	2.6 km	MPC · JPL
159081	2004 TN_{224}	—	October 8, 2004	Kitt Peak	Spacewatch	HOF	3.2 km	MPC · JPL
159082	2004 TU_{237}	—	October 9, 2004	Socorro	LINEAR	·	5.0 km	MPC · JPL
159083	2004 TY_{242}	—	October 6, 2004	Socorro	LINEAR	·	3.1 km	MPC · JPL
159084	2004 TK_{250}	—	October 7, 2004	Palomar	NEAT	·	2.8 km	MPC · JPL
159085	2004 TO_{256}	—	October 9, 2004	Kitt Peak	Spacewatch	·	4.3 km	MPC · JPL
159086	2004 TG_{275}	—	October 9, 2004	Kitt Peak	Spacewatch	·	3.8 km	MPC · JPL
159087	2004 TY_{275}	—	October 9, 2004	Kitt Peak	Spacewatch	·	3.8 km	MPC · JPL
159088	2004 TD_{282}	—	October 12, 2004	Anderson Mesa	LONEOS	EUN	2.3 km	MPC · JPL
159089	2004 TO_{287}	—	October 9, 2004	Socorro	LINEAR	·	3.2 km	MPC · JPL
159090	2004 TD_{288}	—	October 9, 2004	Kitt Peak	Spacewatch	·	6.1 km	MPC · JPL
159091	2004 TL_{294}	—	October 10, 2004	Kitt Peak	Spacewatch	·	4.6 km	MPC · JPL
159092	2004 TS_{294}	—	October 10, 2004	Kitt Peak	Spacewatch	·	2.0 km	MPC · JPL
159093	2004 TB_{296}	—	October 10, 2004	Kitt Peak	Spacewatch	·	4.7 km	MPC · JPL
159094	2004 TL_{303}	—	October 9, 2004	Kitt Peak	Spacewatch	·	2.9 km	MPC · JPL
159095	2004 TM_{317}	—	October 11, 2004	Kitt Peak	Spacewatch	·	3.4 km	MPC · JPL
159096	2004 TO_{321}	—	October 11, 2004	Kitt Peak	Spacewatch	·	2.9 km	MPC · JPL
159097	2004 TE_{324}	—	October 11, 2004	Kitt Peak	Spacewatch	THM	3.4 km	MPC · JPL
159098	2004 TA_{333}	—	October 9, 2004	Kitt Peak	Spacewatch	·	4.7 km	MPC · JPL
159099	2004 TH_{334}	—	October 9, 2004	Kitt Peak	Spacewatch	KOR	2.0 km	MPC · JPL
159100	2004 TU_{349}	—	October 9, 2004	Kitt Peak	Spacewatch	EOS	2.9 km	MPC · JPL

== 159101–159200 ==
back to top

Designation			Discovery			Properties		Ref
Permanent	Provisional	Named after	Date	Site	Discoverer(s)	Category	Diam.	Ref
159101	2004 TP_{351}	—	October 10, 2004	Kitt Peak	Spacewatch	·	2.1 km	MPC · JPL
159102 Sarahflanigan	2004 TU_{354}	Sarahflanigan	October 11, 2004	Kitt Peak	M. W. Buie	TEL	2.3 km	MPC · JPL
159103	2004 TR_{366}	—	October 9, 2004	Socorro	LINEAR	·	2.8 km	MPC · JPL
159104	2004 UD_{6}	—	October 20, 2004	Socorro	LINEAR	·	3.7 km	MPC · JPL
159105	2004 UA_{11}	—	October 23, 2004	Kitt Peak	Spacewatch	·	4.0 km	MPC · JPL
159106	2004 VB_{3}	—	November 3, 2004	Kitt Peak	Spacewatch	KOR	2.3 km	MPC · JPL
159107	2004 VS_{3}	—	November 3, 2004	Kitt Peak	Spacewatch	KOR	2.0 km	MPC · JPL
159108	2004 VA_{9}	—	November 3, 2004	Anderson Mesa	LONEOS	·	2.8 km	MPC · JPL
159109	2004 VV_{11}	—	November 3, 2004	Catalina	CSS	·	4.1 km	MPC · JPL
159110	2004 VF_{15}	—	November 5, 2004	Palomar	NEAT	·	2.9 km	MPC · JPL
159111	2004 VG_{15}	—	November 5, 2004	Anderson Mesa	LONEOS	·	2.0 km	MPC · JPL
159112	2004 VQ_{16}	—	November 3, 2004	Palomar	NEAT	EOS	2.9 km	MPC · JPL
159113	2004 VT_{18}	—	November 4, 2004	Kitt Peak	Spacewatch	KOR	1.8 km	MPC · JPL
159114	2004 VY_{18}	—	November 4, 2004	Kitt Peak	Spacewatch	·	3.1 km	MPC · JPL
159115	2004 VJ_{19}	—	November 4, 2004	Kitt Peak	Spacewatch	HYG	4.0 km	MPC · JPL
159116	2004 VV_{22}	—	November 4, 2004	Catalina	CSS	·	4.6 km	MPC · JPL
159117	2004 VX_{23}	—	November 5, 2004	Campo Imperatore	CINEOS	·	3.2 km	MPC · JPL
159118	2004 VA_{25}	—	November 4, 2004	Anderson Mesa	LONEOS	VER	4.7 km	MPC · JPL
159119	2004 VE_{31}	—	November 3, 2004	Kitt Peak	Spacewatch	·	3.4 km	MPC · JPL
159120	2004 VM_{31}	—	November 3, 2004	Kitt Peak	Spacewatch	EOS	3.0 km	MPC · JPL
159121	2004 VA_{36}	—	November 4, 2004	Kitt Peak	Spacewatch	KOR	2.1 km	MPC · JPL
159122	2004 VE_{51}	—	November 4, 2004	Kitt Peak	Spacewatch	·	2.2 km	MPC · JPL
159123	2004 VL_{53}	—	November 7, 2004	Socorro	LINEAR	·	3.2 km	MPC · JPL
159124	2004 VP_{62}	—	November 6, 2004	Socorro	LINEAR	·	5.5 km	MPC · JPL
159125	2004 VQ_{62}	—	November 6, 2004	Socorro	LINEAR	·	1.8 km	MPC · JPL
159126	2004 VT_{64}	—	November 10, 2004	Kitt Peak	Spacewatch	EOS	6.9 km	MPC · JPL
159127	2004 VW_{73}	—	November 11, 2004	Anderson Mesa	LONEOS	EOS	2.9 km	MPC · JPL
159128	2004 VS_{76}	—	November 12, 2004	Catalina	CSS	·	3.8 km	MPC · JPL
159129	2004 VV_{91}	—	November 3, 2004	Palomar	NEAT	KOR	2.7 km	MPC · JPL
159130	2004 VO_{109}	—	November 9, 2004	Mauna Kea	Veillet, C.	·	2.8 km	MPC · JPL
159131	2004 WF_{2}	—	November 17, 2004	Campo Imperatore	CINEOS	·	3.7 km	MPC · JPL
159132	2004 WU_{3}	—	November 17, 2004	Campo Imperatore	CINEOS	·	5.0 km	MPC · JPL
159133	2004 WG_{5}	—	November 18, 2004	Socorro	LINEAR	·	3.9 km	MPC · JPL
159134	2004 XR_{2}	—	December 2, 2004	Socorro	LINEAR	·	2.4 km	MPC · JPL
159135	2004 XL_{7}	—	December 2, 2004	Palomar	NEAT	·	5.4 km	MPC · JPL
159136	2004 XY_{8}	—	December 2, 2004	Catalina	CSS	·	6.4 km	MPC · JPL
159137	2004 XK_{9}	—	December 2, 2004	Catalina	CSS	·	2.7 km	MPC · JPL
159138	2004 XT_{10}	—	December 3, 2004	Kitt Peak	Spacewatch	·	4.9 km	MPC · JPL
159139	2004 XO_{15}	—	December 9, 2004	Socorro	LINEAR	RAF	3.5 km	MPC · JPL
159140	2004 XJ_{21}	—	December 8, 2004	Socorro	LINEAR	·	5.2 km	MPC · JPL
159141	2004 XM_{30}	—	December 10, 2004	Campo Imperatore	CINEOS	·	3.4 km	MPC · JPL
159142	2004 XQ_{33}	—	December 11, 2004	Campo Imperatore	CINEOS	THM	4.2 km	MPC · JPL
159143	2004 XY_{39}	—	December 10, 2004	Socorro	LINEAR	·	2.8 km	MPC · JPL
159144	2004 XQ_{40}	—	December 11, 2004	Kitt Peak	Spacewatch	·	3.8 km	MPC · JPL
159145	2004 XZ_{60}	—	December 14, 2004	Campo Imperatore	CINEOS	·	3.8 km	MPC · JPL
159146	2004 XQ_{68}	—	December 7, 2004	Socorro	LINEAR	·	5.0 km	MPC · JPL
159147	2004 XH_{73}	—	December 10, 2004	Socorro	LINEAR	·	4.4 km	MPC · JPL
159148	2004 XZ_{76}	—	December 10, 2004	Socorro	LINEAR	·	4.1 km	MPC · JPL
159149	2004 XH_{104}	—	December 10, 2004	Socorro	LINEAR	KOR	2.4 km	MPC · JPL
159150	2004 XG_{105}	—	December 11, 2004	Socorro	LINEAR	·	4.8 km	MPC · JPL
159151	2004 XD_{109}	—	December 12, 2004	Socorro	LINEAR	·	2.6 km	MPC · JPL
159152	2004 XP_{130}	—	December 10, 2004	Calvin-Rehoboth	L. A. Molnar	·	3.9 km	MPC · JPL
159153	2004 XP_{133}	—	December 15, 2004	Socorro	LINEAR	(5)	2.4 km	MPC · JPL
159154	2004 XK_{137}	—	December 15, 2004	Socorro	LINEAR	EMA	6.0 km	MPC · JPL
159155	2004 XP_{137}	—	December 4, 2004	Anderson Mesa	LONEOS	·	4.1 km	MPC · JPL
159156	2004 XK_{166}	—	December 2, 2004	Catalina	CSS	·	3.8 km	MPC · JPL
159157	2004 XM_{166}	—	December 2, 2004	Catalina	CSS	·	2.7 km	MPC · JPL
159158	2004 XN_{177}	—	December 11, 2004	Campo Imperatore	CINEOS	·	4.7 km	MPC · JPL
159159	2004 XS_{178}	—	December 13, 2004	Socorro	LINEAR	·	4.0 km	MPC · JPL
159160	2004 XU_{178}	—	December 13, 2004	Socorro	LINEAR	·	3.0 km	MPC · JPL
159161	2004 YW_{6}	—	December 18, 2004	Mount Lemmon	Mount Lemmon Survey	·	7.4 km	MPC · JPL
159162	2005 AY_{64}	—	January 13, 2005	Kitt Peak	Spacewatch	L5	10 km	MPC · JPL
159163	2005 ES_{129}	—	March 9, 2005	Mount Lemmon	Mount Lemmon Survey	L5	10 km	MPC · JPL
159164 La Cañada	2005 JC_{22}	La Cañada	May 3, 2005	La Cañada	Lacruz, J.	·	3.4 km	MPC · JPL
159165	2005 QE_{92}	—	August 26, 2005	Anderson Mesa	LONEOS	H	930 m	MPC · JPL
159166	2005 RP_{24}	—	September 11, 2005	Anderson Mesa	LONEOS	·	1.3 km	MPC · JPL
159167	2005 RP_{25}	—	September 10, 2005	Kingsnake	J. V. McClusky	·	2.4 km	MPC · JPL
159168	2005 SQ_{5}	—	September 23, 2005	Catalina	CSS	·	1.1 km	MPC · JPL
159169	2005 SP_{49}	—	September 24, 2005	Kitt Peak	Spacewatch	·	1.9 km	MPC · JPL
159170	2005 SR_{63}	—	September 26, 2005	Kitt Peak	Spacewatch	·	1.3 km	MPC · JPL
159171	2005 SE_{73}	—	September 23, 2005	Kitt Peak	Spacewatch	·	1.5 km	MPC · JPL
159172	2005 SQ_{105}	—	September 25, 2005	Palomar	NEAT	·	1.3 km	MPC · JPL
159173	2005 SB_{132}	—	September 29, 2005	Kitt Peak	Spacewatch	·	1.1 km	MPC · JPL
159174	2005 SL_{179}	—	September 29, 2005	Anderson Mesa	LONEOS	·	940 m	MPC · JPL
159175	2005 SU_{207}	—	September 30, 2005	Socorro	LINEAR	·	2.0 km	MPC · JPL
159176	2005 SY_{213}	—	September 30, 2005	Catalina	CSS	H	910 m	MPC · JPL
159177	2005 SF_{225}	—	September 29, 2005	Palomar	NEAT	·	1.7 km	MPC · JPL
159178	2005 TK_{28}	—	October 1, 2005	Mount Lemmon	Mount Lemmon Survey	·	4.5 km	MPC · JPL
159179	2005 TN_{47}	—	October 5, 2005	Goodricke-Pigott	R. A. Tucker	·	1.1 km	MPC · JPL
159180	2005 TJ_{152}	—	October 11, 2005	Kitt Peak	Spacewatch	·	1.6 km	MPC · JPL
159181 Berdychiv	2005 US_{12}	Berdychiv	October 29, 2005	Andrushivka	Andrushivka	·	4.2 km	MPC · JPL
159182	2005 UB_{27}	—	October 23, 2005	Catalina	CSS	·	1.2 km	MPC · JPL
159183	2005 UG_{51}	—	October 23, 2005	Catalina	CSS	·	1.3 km	MPC · JPL
159184	2005 US_{59}	—	October 25, 2005	Kitt Peak	Spacewatch	MAS	960 m	MPC · JPL
159185	2005 UZ_{59}	—	October 25, 2005	Anderson Mesa	LONEOS	·	1.4 km	MPC · JPL
159186	2005 US_{80}	—	October 25, 2005	Catalina	CSS	(5)	3.2 km	MPC · JPL
159187	2005 UY_{107}	—	October 22, 2005	Kitt Peak	Spacewatch	·	1.6 km	MPC · JPL
159188	2005 UO_{120}	—	October 24, 2005	Kitt Peak	Spacewatch	·	2.5 km	MPC · JPL
159189	2005 UO_{131}	—	October 24, 2005	Palomar	NEAT	·	2.7 km	MPC · JPL
159190	2005 UR_{142}	—	October 25, 2005	Mount Lemmon	Mount Lemmon Survey	MAS	850 m	MPC · JPL
159191	2005 UW_{149}	—	October 26, 2005	Kitt Peak	Spacewatch	·	1.5 km	MPC · JPL
159192	2005 UT_{156}	—	October 22, 2005	Kitt Peak	Spacewatch	·	1.2 km	MPC · JPL
159193	2005 US_{164}	—	October 24, 2005	Kitt Peak	Spacewatch	MAS	1.1 km	MPC · JPL
159194	2005 UR_{212}	—	October 27, 2005	Kitt Peak	Spacewatch	NYS	1.5 km	MPC · JPL
159195	2005 UY_{215}	—	October 25, 2005	Kitt Peak	Spacewatch	NYS	1.7 km	MPC · JPL
159196	2005 UA_{217}	—	October 26, 2005	Kitt Peak	Spacewatch	·	970 m	MPC · JPL
159197	2005 UD_{218}	—	October 24, 2005	Kitt Peak	Spacewatch	·	5.4 km	MPC · JPL
159198	2005 UB_{238}	—	October 25, 2005	Kitt Peak	Spacewatch	·	1.4 km	MPC · JPL
159199	2005 UA_{248}	—	October 28, 2005	Mount Lemmon	Mount Lemmon Survey	NYS	1.2 km	MPC · JPL
159200	2005 UA_{261}	—	October 25, 2005	Mount Lemmon	Mount Lemmon Survey	·	1.3 km	MPC · JPL

== 159201–159300 ==
back to top

Designation			Discovery			Properties		Ref
Permanent	Provisional	Named after	Date	Site	Discoverer(s)	Category	Diam.	Ref
159201	2005 UH_{281}	—	October 25, 2005	Mount Lemmon	Mount Lemmon Survey	·	1.7 km	MPC · JPL
159202	2005 UB_{318}	—	October 27, 2005	Kitt Peak	Spacewatch	MAS	1.1 km	MPC · JPL
159203	2005 UY_{336}	—	October 30, 2005	Palomar	NEAT	H	870 m	MPC · JPL
159204	2005 UN_{345}	—	October 29, 2005	Mount Lemmon	Mount Lemmon Survey	·	2.2 km	MPC · JPL
159205	2005 UY_{445}	—	October 31, 2005	Mount Lemmon	Mount Lemmon Survey	·	860 m	MPC · JPL
159206	2005 UQ_{453}	—	October 29, 2005	Mount Lemmon	Mount Lemmon Survey	KOR	2.0 km	MPC · JPL
159207	2005 VO_{31}	—	November 4, 2005	Kitt Peak	Spacewatch	NYS	2.0 km	MPC · JPL
159208	2005 VT_{56}	—	November 4, 2005	Kitt Peak	Spacewatch	·	1.2 km	MPC · JPL
159209	2005 VW_{70}	—	November 1, 2005	Mount Lemmon	Mount Lemmon Survey	NYS	1.2 km	MPC · JPL
159210	2005 WO_{9}	—	November 21, 2005	Kitt Peak	Spacewatch	KOR	1.9 km	MPC · JPL
159211	2005 WP_{23}	—	November 21, 2005	Kitt Peak	Spacewatch	·	1 km	MPC · JPL
159212	2005 WF_{25}	—	November 21, 2005	Kitt Peak	Spacewatch	·	1.7 km	MPC · JPL
159213	2005 WH_{36}	—	November 22, 2005	Kitt Peak	Spacewatch	MAS	1.1 km	MPC · JPL
159214	2005 WT_{39}	—	November 25, 2005	Mount Lemmon	Mount Lemmon Survey	·	2.1 km	MPC · JPL
159215 Apan	2005 WS_{59}	Apan	November 30, 2005	Suno	Foglia, S.	·	960 m	MPC · JPL
159216	2005 WD_{72}	—	November 22, 2005	Catalina	CSS	PHO	1.6 km	MPC · JPL
159217	2005 WQ_{73}	—	November 25, 2005	Kitt Peak	Spacewatch	NYS	1.6 km	MPC · JPL
159218	2005 WU_{76}	—	November 25, 2005	Kitt Peak	Spacewatch	·	2.0 km	MPC · JPL
159219	2005 WF_{86}	—	November 28, 2005	Mount Lemmon	Mount Lemmon Survey	MAS	840 m	MPC · JPL
159220	2005 WF_{87}	—	November 28, 2005	Mount Lemmon	Mount Lemmon Survey	AST	2.3 km	MPC · JPL
159221	2005 WX_{98}	—	November 28, 2005	Mount Lemmon	Mount Lemmon Survey	·	1 km	MPC · JPL
159222	2005 WS_{100}	—	November 29, 2005	Socorro	LINEAR	·	1.2 km	MPC · JPL
159223	2005 WO_{114}	—	November 28, 2005	Socorro	LINEAR	(2076)	1.1 km	MPC · JPL
159224	2005 WU_{187}	—	November 29, 2005	Catalina	CSS	·	2.4 km	MPC · JPL
159225	2005 WM_{195}	—	November 25, 2005	Catalina	CSS	TIR	5.2 km	MPC · JPL
159226	2005 WF_{203}	—	November 30, 2005	Kitt Peak	Spacewatch	PHO	1.8 km	MPC · JPL
159227	2005 XU_{3}	—	December 1, 2005	Mount Lemmon	Mount Lemmon Survey	MAS	1.1 km	MPC · JPL
159228	2005 XD_{5}	—	December 1, 2005	Kitami	K. Endate	·	1.2 km	MPC · JPL
159229	2005 XQ_{24}	—	December 2, 2005	Socorro	LINEAR	·	1.4 km	MPC · JPL
159230	2005 XW_{59}	—	December 3, 2005	Kitt Peak	Spacewatch	MIS	2.5 km	MPC · JPL
159231	2005 XF_{60}	—	December 3, 2005	Kitt Peak	Spacewatch	NYS	1.5 km	MPC · JPL
159232	2005 XU_{72}	—	December 6, 2005	Kitt Peak	Spacewatch	AGN	2.0 km	MPC · JPL
159233	2005 XY_{80}	—	December 7, 2005	Kitt Peak	Spacewatch	·	3.0 km	MPC · JPL
159234	2005 XK_{91}	—	December 10, 2005	Kitt Peak	Spacewatch	·	1.8 km	MPC · JPL
159235	2005 YN_{4}	—	December 23, 2005	Needville	M. Eastman, D. Wells	·	1.8 km	MPC · JPL
159236	2005 YE_{15}	—	December 22, 2005	Kitt Peak	Spacewatch	·	2.0 km	MPC · JPL
159237	2005 YR_{16}	—	December 22, 2005	Kitt Peak	Spacewatch	·	1.8 km	MPC · JPL
159238	2005 YN_{30}	—	December 21, 2005	Catalina	CSS	·	2.2 km	MPC · JPL
159239	2005 YP_{32}	—	December 22, 2005	Kitt Peak	Spacewatch	·	2.0 km	MPC · JPL
159240	2005 YW_{33}	—	December 24, 2005	Kitt Peak	Spacewatch	THM	3.7 km	MPC · JPL
159241	2005 YW_{37}	—	December 21, 2005	Catalina	CSS	V	1.1 km	MPC · JPL
159242	2005 YA_{38}	—	December 21, 2005	Catalina	CSS	·	1.8 km	MPC · JPL
159243	2005 YO_{43}	—	December 24, 2005	Palomar	NEAT	·	2.1 km	MPC · JPL
159244	2005 YX_{45}	—	December 25, 2005	Kitt Peak	Spacewatch	THM	4.3 km	MPC · JPL
159245	2005 YL_{49}	—	December 22, 2005	Kitt Peak	Spacewatch	THM	3.1 km	MPC · JPL
159246	2005 YT_{52}	—	December 25, 2005	Mount Lemmon	Mount Lemmon Survey	·	3.7 km	MPC · JPL
159247	2005 YB_{69}	—	December 26, 2005	Kitt Peak	Spacewatch	·	1.6 km	MPC · JPL
159248	2005 YK_{90}	—	December 26, 2005	Mount Lemmon	Mount Lemmon Survey	·	3.7 km	MPC · JPL
159249	2005 YC_{91}	—	December 26, 2005	Mount Lemmon	Mount Lemmon Survey	·	1.2 km	MPC · JPL
159250	2005 YT_{108}	—	December 25, 2005	Kitt Peak	Spacewatch	THM	3.0 km	MPC · JPL
159251	2005 YK_{110}	—	December 25, 2005	Kitt Peak	Spacewatch	·	1.9 km	MPC · JPL
159252	2005 YM_{116}	—	December 25, 2005	Kitt Peak	Spacewatch	GEF	2.1 km	MPC · JPL
159253	2005 YT_{118}	—	December 26, 2005	Mount Lemmon	Mount Lemmon Survey	·	2.5 km	MPC · JPL
159254	2005 YE_{124}	—	December 26, 2005	Kitt Peak	Spacewatch	·	4.6 km	MPC · JPL
159255	2005 YS_{134}	—	December 26, 2005	Kitt Peak	Spacewatch	·	5.0 km	MPC · JPL
159256	2005 YA_{143}	—	December 28, 2005	Mount Lemmon	Mount Lemmon Survey	·	2.3 km	MPC · JPL
159257	2005 YE_{144}	—	December 28, 2005	Mount Lemmon	Mount Lemmon Survey	·	4.6 km	MPC · JPL
159258	2005 YC_{145}	—	December 28, 2005	Mount Lemmon	Mount Lemmon Survey	THM	3.9 km	MPC · JPL
159259	2005 YY_{165}	—	December 26, 2005	Kitt Peak	Spacewatch	·	1.6 km	MPC · JPL
159260	2005 YK_{174}	—	December 29, 2005	Socorro	LINEAR	·	4.2 km	MPC · JPL
159261	2005 YC_{175}	—	December 30, 2005	Socorro	LINEAR	·	2.3 km	MPC · JPL
159262	2005 YH_{177}	—	December 22, 2005	Kitt Peak	Spacewatch	AGN	3.4 km	MPC · JPL
159263	2005 YB_{184}	—	December 27, 2005	Kitt Peak	Spacewatch	BRA	3.7 km	MPC · JPL
159264	2005 YY_{185}	—	December 30, 2005	Kitt Peak	Spacewatch	THM	3.0 km	MPC · JPL
159265	2005 YA_{190}	—	December 30, 2005	Kitt Peak	Spacewatch	·	2.3 km	MPC · JPL
159266	2005 YS_{192}	—	December 30, 2005	Kitt Peak	Spacewatch	·	2.5 km	MPC · JPL
159267	2005 YG_{198}	—	December 25, 2005	Mount Lemmon	Mount Lemmon Survey	·	1.7 km	MPC · JPL
159268	2005 YA_{201}	—	December 22, 2005	Kitt Peak	Spacewatch	·	2.4 km	MPC · JPL
159269	2005 YP_{203}	—	December 25, 2005	Mount Lemmon	Mount Lemmon Survey	·	2.7 km	MPC · JPL
159270	2005 YC_{209}	—	December 22, 2005	Catalina	CSS	·	3.5 km	MPC · JPL
159271	2005 YB_{213}	—	December 29, 2005	Catalina	CSS	·	1.4 km	MPC · JPL
159272	2005 YU_{215}	—	December 29, 2005	Catalina	CSS	slow	1.3 km	MPC · JPL
159273	2005 YH_{240}	—	December 29, 2005	Mount Lemmon	Mount Lemmon Survey	·	2.4 km	MPC · JPL
159274	2005 YV_{247}	—	December 30, 2005	Kitt Peak	Spacewatch	MAS	1.2 km	MPC · JPL
159275	2006 AD_{4}	—	January 7, 2006	RAS	Lowe, A.	·	3.5 km	MPC · JPL
159276	2006 AE_{5}	—	January 2, 2006	Catalina	CSS	·	1.8 km	MPC · JPL
159277	2006 AL_{5}	—	January 2, 2006	Catalina	CSS	·	4.7 km	MPC · JPL
159278	2006 AL_{7}	—	January 5, 2006	Catalina	CSS	EUN	1.8 km	MPC · JPL
159279	2006 AB_{13}	—	January 5, 2006	Anderson Mesa	LONEOS	NEM	2.4 km	MPC · JPL
159280	2006 AG_{18}	—	January 5, 2006	Anderson Mesa	LONEOS	·	5.6 km	MPC · JPL
159281	2006 AK_{19}	—	January 2, 2006	Catalina	CSS	EOS	3.7 km	MPC · JPL
159282	2006 AC_{27}	—	January 5, 2006	Socorro	LINEAR	·	5.0 km	MPC · JPL
159283	2006 AP_{27}	—	January 5, 2006	Kitt Peak	Spacewatch	MRX	1.7 km	MPC · JPL
159284	2006 AT_{32}	—	January 5, 2006	Catalina	CSS	TIR	5.9 km	MPC · JPL
159285	2006 AG_{35}	—	January 4, 2006	Kitt Peak	Spacewatch	·	3.0 km	MPC · JPL
159286	2006 AH_{36}	—	January 4, 2006	Kitt Peak	Spacewatch	·	3.0 km	MPC · JPL
159287	2006 AN_{40}	—	January 7, 2006	Mount Lemmon	Mount Lemmon Survey	·	2.9 km	MPC · JPL
159288	2006 AL_{71}	—	January 6, 2006	Kitt Peak	Spacewatch	HYG	4.0 km	MPC · JPL
159289	2006 AY_{71}	—	January 6, 2006	Kitt Peak	Spacewatch	·	3.0 km	MPC · JPL
159290	2006 AU_{77}	—	January 7, 2006	Kitt Peak	Spacewatch	·	2.1 km	MPC · JPL
159291	2006 BX	—	January 20, 2006	Socorro	LINEAR	EUP	7.9 km	MPC · JPL
159292	2006 BE_{7}	—	January 20, 2006	Kitt Peak	Spacewatch	·	3.3 km	MPC · JPL
159293	2006 BV_{21}	—	January 22, 2006	Mount Lemmon	Mount Lemmon Survey	·	1.5 km	MPC · JPL
159294	2006 BQ_{30}	—	January 20, 2006	Kitt Peak	Spacewatch	·	4.9 km	MPC · JPL
159295	2006 BP_{43}	—	January 23, 2006	Catalina	CSS	·	2.4 km	MPC · JPL
159296	2006 BM_{44}	—	January 23, 2006	Junk Bond	D. Healy	·	3.2 km	MPC · JPL
159297	2006 BT_{45}	—	January 23, 2006	Mount Lemmon	Mount Lemmon Survey	·	6.6 km	MPC · JPL
159298	2006 BV_{46}	—	January 23, 2006	Mount Lemmon	Mount Lemmon Survey	EOS	3.5 km	MPC · JPL
159299	2006 BJ_{50}	—	January 25, 2006	Kitt Peak	Spacewatch	·	3.4 km	MPC · JPL
159300	2006 BZ_{57}	—	January 23, 2006	Mount Lemmon	Mount Lemmon Survey	KOR	1.5 km	MPC · JPL

== 159301–159400 ==
back to top

Designation			Discovery			Properties		Ref
Permanent	Provisional	Named after	Date	Site	Discoverer(s)	Category	Diam.	Ref
159301	2006 BD_{62}	—	January 22, 2006	Catalina	CSS	·	3.9 km	MPC · JPL
159302	2006 BF_{65}	—	January 22, 2006	Mount Lemmon	Mount Lemmon Survey	KOR	2.0 km	MPC · JPL
159303	2006 BY_{66}	—	January 23, 2006	Kitt Peak	Spacewatch	·	4.0 km	MPC · JPL
159304	2006 BK_{77}	—	January 23, 2006	Mount Lemmon	Mount Lemmon Survey	·	1.6 km	MPC · JPL
159305	2006 BG_{79}	—	January 23, 2006	Kitt Peak	Spacewatch	·	4.3 km	MPC · JPL
159306	2006 BA_{81}	—	January 23, 2006	Kitt Peak	Spacewatch	MRX	1.9 km	MPC · JPL
159307	2006 BY_{89}	—	January 25, 2006	Kitt Peak	Spacewatch	THM	3.3 km	MPC · JPL
159308	2006 BV_{98}	—	January 25, 2006	Catalina	CSS	·	5.1 km	MPC · JPL
159309	2006 BO_{100}	—	January 28, 2006	7300 Observatory	W. K. Y. Yeung	·	2.3 km	MPC · JPL
159310	2006 BG_{101}	—	January 23, 2006	Mount Lemmon	Mount Lemmon Survey	·	1.9 km	MPC · JPL
159311	2006 BV_{101}	—	January 23, 2006	Mount Lemmon	Mount Lemmon Survey	EOS	3.5 km	MPC · JPL
159312	2006 BE_{149}	—	January 23, 2006	Catalina	CSS	EOS	3.2 km	MPC · JPL
159313	2006 BF_{150}	—	January 24, 2006	Anderson Mesa	LONEOS	·	3.1 km	MPC · JPL
159314	2006 BQ_{152}	—	January 25, 2006	Kitt Peak	Spacewatch	·	2.3 km	MPC · JPL
159315	2006 BU_{166}	—	January 26, 2006	Mount Lemmon	Mount Lemmon Survey	·	4.1 km	MPC · JPL
159316	2006 BY_{185}	—	January 28, 2006	Mount Lemmon	Mount Lemmon Survey	·	4.2 km	MPC · JPL
159317	2006 BK_{195}	—	January 30, 2006	Kitt Peak	Spacewatch	EOS	2.7 km	MPC · JPL
159318	2006 BG_{207}	—	January 31, 2006	Mount Lemmon	Mount Lemmon Survey	·	2.1 km	MPC · JPL
159319	2006 BT_{220}	—	January 30, 2006	Kitt Peak	Spacewatch	·	3.3 km	MPC · JPL
159320	2006 BH_{222}	—	January 30, 2006	Kitt Peak	Spacewatch	GEF	2.2 km	MPC · JPL
159321	2006 BZ_{267}	—	January 26, 2006	Catalina	CSS	·	5.4 km	MPC · JPL
159322	2006 BY_{270}	—	January 26, 2006	Palomar	NEAT	·	3.4 km	MPC · JPL
159323	2006 BH_{274}	—	January 23, 2006	Mount Lemmon	Mount Lemmon Survey	·	3.1 km	MPC · JPL
159324	2006 CW_{11}	—	February 1, 2006	Kitt Peak	Spacewatch	THM	4.9 km	MPC · JPL
159325	2006 CN_{14}	—	February 1, 2006	Kitt Peak	Spacewatch	·	3.0 km	MPC · JPL
159326	2006 CL_{15}	—	February 1, 2006	Kitt Peak	Spacewatch	·	5.1 km	MPC · JPL
159327	2006 CW_{26}	—	February 2, 2006	Kitt Peak	Spacewatch	THM	2.9 km	MPC · JPL
159328	2006 CF_{27}	—	February 2, 2006	Kitt Peak	Spacewatch	·	1.9 km	MPC · JPL
159329	2006 CA_{50}	—	February 3, 2006	Mount Lemmon	Mount Lemmon Survey	·	4.2 km	MPC · JPL
159330	2006 CZ_{50}	—	February 4, 2006	Kitt Peak	Spacewatch	·	2.4 km	MPC · JPL
159331	2006 DU_{5}	—	February 20, 2006	Catalina	CSS	·	4.7 km	MPC · JPL
159332	2006 DM_{10}	—	February 20, 2006	Kitt Peak	Spacewatch	EOS	3.3 km	MPC · JPL
159333	2006 DL_{26}	—	February 20, 2006	Mount Lemmon	Mount Lemmon Survey	·	2.3 km	MPC · JPL
159334	2006 DT_{41}	—	February 23, 2006	Mount Lemmon	Mount Lemmon Survey	·	3.5 km	MPC · JPL
159335	2006 DE_{67}	—	February 22, 2006	Anderson Mesa	LONEOS	·	5.9 km	MPC · JPL
159336	2006 DD_{79}	—	February 24, 2006	Kitt Peak	Spacewatch	·	3.7 km	MPC · JPL
159337	2006 DQ_{163}	—	February 27, 2006	Mount Lemmon	Mount Lemmon Survey	AGN	2.0 km	MPC · JPL
159338	2006 DG_{198}	—	February 26, 2006	Anderson Mesa	LONEOS	·	6.8 km	MPC · JPL
159339	2006 EE_{14}	—	March 2, 2006	Kitt Peak	Spacewatch	3:2	7.2 km	MPC · JPL
159340	2006 EF_{14}	—	March 2, 2006	Kitt Peak	Spacewatch	L5	13 km	MPC · JPL
159341	2006 FX_{1}	—	March 23, 2006	Mount Lemmon	Mount Lemmon Survey	KOR	2.3 km	MPC · JPL
159342	2006 JR	—	May 2, 2006	Siding Spring	SSS	L5	27 km	MPC · JPL
159343	2006 QP_{112}	—	August 23, 2006	Palomar	NEAT	·	4.5 km	MPC · JPL
159344	2006 QS_{142}	—	August 29, 2006	Catalina	CSS	·	1.9 km	MPC · JPL
159345	2006 SV_{12}	—	September 16, 2006	Palomar	NEAT	MAS	1.1 km	MPC · JPL
159346	2006 SM_{212}	—	September 26, 2006	Kitt Peak	Spacewatch	·	4.4 km	MPC · JPL
159347	2006 XS_{15}	—	December 10, 2006	Kitt Peak	Spacewatch	·	2.4 km	MPC · JPL
159348	2007 CJ_{61}	—	February 15, 2007	Catalina	CSS	·	1.2 km	MPC · JPL
159349	2007 DL_{4}	—	February 16, 2007	Mount Lemmon	Mount Lemmon Survey	JUN	1.6 km	MPC · JPL
159350	2007 DL_{100}	—	February 25, 2007	Catalina	CSS	·	2.8 km	MPC · JPL
159351 Leonpascal	2007 EB_{10}	Leonpascal	March 10, 2007	Marly	P. Kocher	·	1.3 km	MPC · JPL
159352	2007 EZ_{47}	—	March 9, 2007	Kitt Peak	Spacewatch	·	2.7 km	MPC · JPL
159353	2007 EU_{88}	—	March 9, 2007	Kitt Peak	Spacewatch	·	3.5 km	MPC · JPL
159354	2007 EL_{137}	—	March 11, 2007	Kitt Peak	Spacewatch	EOS	2.6 km	MPC · JPL
159355	2007 EA_{138}	—	March 11, 2007	Kitt Peak	Spacewatch	·	3.5 km	MPC · JPL
159356	2007 ES_{180}	—	March 14, 2007	Mount Lemmon	Mount Lemmon Survey	·	3.6 km	MPC · JPL
159357	2007 EF_{204}	—	March 10, 2007	Kitt Peak	Spacewatch	·	5.0 km	MPC · JPL
159358	2007 FA_{31}	—	March 20, 2007	Kitt Peak	Spacewatch	THM	3.6 km	MPC · JPL
159359	2007 FX_{35}	—	March 25, 2007	Catalina	CSS	·	6.8 km	MPC · JPL
159360	2007 FF_{39}	—	March 30, 2007	Palomar	NEAT	·	5.8 km	MPC · JPL
159361	2007 GU_{23}	—	April 11, 2007	Kitt Peak	Spacewatch	MAS	1.1 km	MPC · JPL
159362	2007 GX_{44}	—	April 14, 2007	Kitt Peak	Spacewatch	·	2.9 km	MPC · JPL
159363	2007 HT_{23}	—	April 18, 2007	Kitt Peak	Spacewatch	·	1.0 km	MPC · JPL
159364	4854 P-L	—	September 24, 1960	Palomar	C. J. van Houten, I. van Houten-Groeneveld, T. Gehrels	·	1.8 km	MPC · JPL
159365	6752 P-L	—	September 24, 1960	Palomar	C. J. van Houten, I. van Houten-Groeneveld, T. Gehrels	THM	4.7 km	MPC · JPL
159366	3133 T-2	—	September 30, 1973	Palomar	C. J. van Houten, I. van Houten-Groeneveld, T. Gehrels	·	4.1 km	MPC · JPL
159367	1977 OX	—	July 22, 1977	Siding Spring	R. H. McNaught	T_{j} (2.89) · CYB · 2:1J (unstable)	4.1 km	MPC · JPL
159368	1979 QB	—	August 22, 1979	Palomar	E. F. Helin	·	1.4 km	MPC · JPL
159369	1993 UJ_{4}	—	October 20, 1993	La Silla	E. W. Elst	V	1.1 km	MPC · JPL
159370	1994 JA_{2}	—	May 1, 1994	Kitt Peak	Spacewatch	·	1.9 km	MPC · JPL
159371	1995 CG_{8}	—	February 2, 1995	Kitt Peak	Spacewatch	·	3.7 km	MPC · JPL
159372	1995 YP_{7}	—	December 16, 1995	Kitt Peak	Spacewatch	·	3.2 km	MPC · JPL
159373	1996 FD_{18}	—	March 22, 1996	La Silla	E. W. Elst	·	2.2 km	MPC · JPL
159374	1996 RW_{7}	—	September 6, 1996	Kitt Peak	Spacewatch	·	1.7 km	MPC · JPL
159375	1996 XQ_{31}	—	December 8, 1996	Xinglong	SCAP	ADE	3.9 km	MPC · JPL
159376	1997 GW_{31}	—	April 15, 1997	Kitt Peak	Spacewatch	·	3.9 km	MPC · JPL
159377	1997 TO_{1}	—	October 3, 1997	Caussols	ODAS	·	1.3 km	MPC · JPL
159378	1997 TS_{20}	—	October 4, 1997	Kitt Peak	Spacewatch	L4	10 km	MPC · JPL
159379	1998 AQ_{5}	—	January 8, 1998	Caussols	ODAS	·	2.8 km	MPC · JPL
159380	1998 CV	—	February 4, 1998	Kleť	M. Tichý, Z. Moravec	(5)	2.3 km	MPC · JPL
159381	1998 FB	—	March 16, 1998	Stroncone	Santa Lucia	·	2.4 km	MPC · JPL
159382	1998 FQ_{110}	—	March 31, 1998	Socorro	LINEAR	·	3.0 km	MPC · JPL
159383	1998 FC_{136}	—	March 28, 1998	Socorro	LINEAR	·	2.9 km	MPC · JPL
159384	1998 HO_{147}	—	April 23, 1998	Socorro	LINEAR	EUN	2.8 km	MPC · JPL
159385	1998 KC_{7}	—	May 22, 1998	Anderson Mesa	LONEOS	·	3.6 km	MPC · JPL
159386	1998 KE_{58}	—	May 28, 1998	Xinglong	SCAP	·	4.4 km	MPC · JPL
159387	1998 MT_{18}	—	June 19, 1998	Caussols	ODAS	·	4.1 km	MPC · JPL
159388	1998 OL_{11}	—	July 26, 1998	La Silla	E. W. Elst	·	5.0 km	MPC · JPL
159389	1998 QW_{3}	—	August 22, 1998	Haleakala	NEAT	·	4.5 km	MPC · JPL
159390	1998 QJ_{11}	—	August 17, 1998	Socorro	LINEAR	EUN	2.6 km	MPC · JPL
159391	1998 QD_{28}	—	August 26, 1998	Kitt Peak	Spacewatch	NAE	4.8 km	MPC · JPL
159392	1998 QY_{35}	—	August 17, 1998	Socorro	LINEAR	·	5.4 km	MPC · JPL
159393	1998 SR_{15}	—	September 16, 1998	Kitt Peak	Spacewatch	KOR	2.1 km	MPC · JPL
159394	1998 SK_{37}	—	September 21, 1998	Kitt Peak	Spacewatch	·	3.2 km	MPC · JPL
159395	1998 SQ_{41}	—	September 25, 1998	Kitt Peak	Spacewatch	·	2.4 km	MPC · JPL
159396	1998 SH_{70}	—	September 21, 1998	Socorro	LINEAR	DOR	5.4 km	MPC · JPL
159397	1998 SD_{90}	—	September 26, 1998	Socorro	LINEAR	EOS	3.8 km	MPC · JPL
159398	1998 TN_{38}	—	October 12, 1998	Anderson Mesa	LONEOS	·	4.8 km	MPC · JPL
159399	1998 UL_{1}	—	October 18, 1998	Socorro	LINEAR	AMO +1km	1.8 km	MPC · JPL
159400	1998 VL	—	November 7, 1998	Goodricke-Pigott	R. A. Tucker	·	1.4 km	MPC · JPL

== 159401–159500 ==
back to top

Designation			Discovery			Properties		Ref
Permanent	Provisional	Named after	Date	Site	Discoverer(s)	Category	Diam.	Ref
159401	1998 VM_{22}	—	November 10, 1998	Socorro	LINEAR	·	7.0 km	MPC · JPL
159402	1999 AP_{10}	—	January 14, 1999	Socorro	LINEAR	AMO +1km	1.7 km	MPC · JPL
159403	1999 CN_{141}	—	February 10, 1999	Kitt Peak	Spacewatch	·	1.1 km	MPC · JPL
159404	1999 FX_{34}	—	March 19, 1999	Socorro	LINEAR	·	2.7 km	MPC · JPL
159405	1999 JG_{110}	—	May 13, 1999	Socorro	LINEAR	·	4.2 km	MPC · JPL
159406	1999 KO	—	May 16, 1999	Catalina	CSS	PHO	3.2 km	MPC · JPL
159407	1999 NW_{51}	—	July 12, 1999	Socorro	LINEAR	·	6.3 km	MPC · JPL
159408	1999 NU_{53}	—	July 12, 1999	Socorro	LINEAR	ADE	5.1 km	MPC · JPL
159409 Ratte	1999 OJ	Ratte	July 16, 1999	Pises	Pises	·	2.5 km	MPC · JPL
159410	1999 RU_{122}	—	September 9, 1999	Socorro	LINEAR	·	5.9 km	MPC · JPL
159411	1999 RG_{126}	—	September 9, 1999	Socorro	LINEAR	·	3.4 km	MPC · JPL
159412	1999 RZ_{133}	—	September 9, 1999	Socorro	LINEAR	fast	2.5 km	MPC · JPL
159413	1999 RS_{145}	—	September 9, 1999	Socorro	LINEAR	·	4.4 km	MPC · JPL
159414	1999 RN_{178}	—	September 9, 1999	Socorro	LINEAR	·	3.0 km	MPC · JPL
159415	1999 RL_{189}	—	September 9, 1999	Socorro	LINEAR	·	3.5 km	MPC · JPL
159416	1999 RV_{201}	—	September 8, 1999	Socorro	LINEAR	JUN	2.2 km	MPC · JPL
159417	1999 RM_{232}	—	September 9, 1999	Anderson Mesa	LONEOS	·	5.8 km	MPC · JPL
159418	1999 RD_{233}	—	September 8, 1999	Anderson Mesa	LONEOS	ADE	4.2 km	MPC · JPL
159419	1999 SQ_{6}	—	September 30, 1999	Socorro	LINEAR	EUN	2.8 km	MPC · JPL
159420	1999 SN_{14}	—	September 30, 1999	Catalina	CSS	MRX	1.7 km	MPC · JPL
159421	1999 TN_{10}	—	October 8, 1999	San Marcello	L. Tesi, M. Tombelli	·	1.9 km	MPC · JPL
159422	1999 TL_{34}	—	October 3, 1999	Catalina	CSS	·	3.6 km	MPC · JPL
159423	1999 TQ_{75}	—	October 10, 1999	Kitt Peak	Spacewatch	·	2.9 km	MPC · JPL
159424	1999 TD_{97}	—	October 2, 1999	Socorro	LINEAR	DOR · slow	4.4 km	MPC · JPL
159425	1999 TY_{151}	—	October 7, 1999	Socorro	LINEAR	ADE	3.6 km	MPC · JPL
159426	1999 TJ_{265}	—	October 3, 1999	Socorro	LINEAR	·	2.5 km	MPC · JPL
159427	1999 TG_{268}	—	October 3, 1999	Socorro	LINEAR	EUN	2.7 km	MPC · JPL
159428	1999 UH_{4}	—	October 31, 1999	Oaxaca	Roe, J. M.	·	4.0 km	MPC · JPL
159429	1999 UM_{20}	—	October 31, 1999	Kitt Peak	Spacewatch	AST	3.3 km	MPC · JPL
159430	1999 UL_{50}	—	October 30, 1999	Catalina	CSS	MRX	1.7 km	MPC · JPL
159431	1999 VT_{18}	—	November 2, 1999	Kitt Peak	Spacewatch	·	1.7 km	MPC · JPL
159432	1999 VW_{18}	—	November 2, 1999	Kitt Peak	Spacewatch	·	2.4 km	MPC · JPL
159433	1999 VO_{93}	—	November 9, 1999	Socorro	LINEAR	·	3.4 km	MPC · JPL
159434	1999 VQ_{94}	—	November 9, 1999	Socorro	LINEAR	·	3.1 km	MPC · JPL
159435	1999 VJ_{178}	—	November 6, 1999	Socorro	LINEAR	·	4.2 km	MPC · JPL
159436	1999 VS_{178}	—	November 6, 1999	Socorro	LINEAR	·	3.6 km	MPC · JPL
159437	1999 VS_{208}	—	November 11, 1999	Kitt Peak	Spacewatch	·	4.4 km	MPC · JPL
159438	1999 XM_{3}	—	December 4, 1999	Catalina	CSS	·	3.0 km	MPC · JPL
159439	1999 XR_{12}	—	December 5, 1999	Socorro	LINEAR	·	3.7 km	MPC · JPL
159440	1999 XL_{62}	—	December 7, 1999	Socorro	LINEAR	·	2.2 km	MPC · JPL
159441	1999 XZ_{88}	—	December 7, 1999	Socorro	LINEAR	·	4.4 km	MPC · JPL
159442	1999 XY_{152}	—	December 7, 1999	Socorro	LINEAR	·	4.0 km	MPC · JPL
159443	1999 XD_{171}	—	December 10, 1999	Socorro	LINEAR	·	3.4 km	MPC · JPL
159444	1999 XN_{209}	—	December 13, 1999	Socorro	LINEAR	EUN · slow	3.6 km	MPC · JPL
159445	2000 AA_{25}	—	January 3, 2000	Socorro	LINEAR	JUN	2.5 km	MPC · JPL
159446	2000 AF_{83}	—	January 5, 2000	Socorro	LINEAR	EOS	3.7 km	MPC · JPL
159447	2000 AT_{107}	—	January 5, 2000	Socorro	LINEAR	·	5.1 km	MPC · JPL
159448	2000 AH_{199}	—	January 9, 2000	Socorro	LINEAR	·	3.9 km	MPC · JPL
159449	2000 AD_{224}	—	January 10, 2000	Kitt Peak	Spacewatch	·	4.5 km	MPC · JPL
159450	2000 BK_{33}	—	January 30, 2000	Kitt Peak	Spacewatch	·	5.1 km	MPC · JPL
159451	2000 BB_{38}	—	January 28, 2000	Kitt Peak	Spacewatch	·	4.4 km	MPC · JPL
159452	2000 BC_{38}	—	January 28, 2000	Kitt Peak	Spacewatch	·	3.4 km	MPC · JPL
159453	2000 BH_{44}	—	January 28, 2000	Kitt Peak	Spacewatch	·	5.5 km	MPC · JPL
159454	2000 DJ_{8}	—	February 26, 2000	Socorro	LINEAR	AMO +1km	580 m	MPC · JPL
159455	2000 DD_{32}	—	February 29, 2000	Socorro	LINEAR	LUT	5.9 km	MPC · JPL
159456	2000 ER_{131}	—	March 11, 2000	Anderson Mesa	LONEOS	·	1.3 km	MPC · JPL
159457	2000 JP_{38}	—	May 7, 2000	Socorro	LINEAR	·	1.2 km	MPC · JPL
159458	2000 JW_{83}	—	May 5, 2000	Socorro	LINEAR	PHO	1.3 km	MPC · JPL
159459	2000 KB	—	May 22, 2000	Anderson Mesa	LONEOS	T_{j} (2.68) · APO +1km	1.8 km	MPC · JPL
159460	2000 KP_{66}	—	May 28, 2000	Anderson Mesa	LONEOS	PHO	1.7 km	MPC · JPL
159461	2000 OR	—	July 23, 2000	Reedy Creek	J. Broughton	·	2.7 km	MPC · JPL
159462	2000 OO_{3}	—	July 24, 2000	Socorro	LINEAR	·	1.5 km	MPC · JPL
159463	2000 PM_{7}	—	August 2, 2000	Socorro	LINEAR	·	2.3 km	MPC · JPL
159464	2000 PP_{23}	—	August 2, 2000	Socorro	LINEAR	NYS	1.7 km	MPC · JPL
159465	2000 QJ_{2}	—	August 24, 2000	Socorro	LINEAR	PHO	2.4 km	MPC · JPL
159466	2000 QB_{10}	—	August 24, 2000	Socorro	LINEAR	·	4.6 km	MPC · JPL
159467	2000 QK_{25}	—	August 26, 2000	Socorro	LINEAR	AMO	760 m	MPC · JPL
159468	2000 QG_{107}	—	August 29, 2000	Socorro	LINEAR	·	2.3 km	MPC · JPL
159469	2000 QZ_{117}	—	August 25, 2000	Socorro	LINEAR	·	2.6 km	MPC · JPL
159470	2000 QW_{119}	—	August 25, 2000	Socorro	LINEAR	·	2.1 km	MPC · JPL
159471	2000 QH_{122}	—	August 25, 2000	Socorro	LINEAR	·	2.5 km	MPC · JPL
159472	2000 QA_{176}	—	August 31, 2000	Socorro	LINEAR	·	1.9 km	MPC · JPL
159473	2000 RB	—	September 1, 2000	Socorro	LINEAR	PHO · slow	2.1 km	MPC · JPL
159474	2000 RU_{3}	—	September 1, 2000	Socorro	LINEAR	·	2.9 km	MPC · JPL
159475	2000 RU_{67}	—	September 1, 2000	Socorro	LINEAR	EUN	2.3 km	MPC · JPL
159476	2000 RH_{79}	—	September 9, 2000	Socorro	LINEAR	PHO	2.5 km	MPC · JPL
159477	2000 SE	—	September 17, 2000	Socorro	LINEAR	·	1.9 km	MPC · JPL
159478	2000 SZ_{17}	—	September 23, 2000	Socorro	LINEAR	·	2.6 km	MPC · JPL
159479	2000 SY_{33}	—	September 24, 2000	Socorro	LINEAR	NYS	2.1 km	MPC · JPL
159480	2000 SR_{66}	—	September 24, 2000	Socorro	LINEAR	NYS	1.9 km	MPC · JPL
159481	2000 SX_{147}	—	September 24, 2000	Socorro	LINEAR	·	1.9 km	MPC · JPL
159482	2000 SF_{166}	—	September 23, 2000	Socorro	LINEAR	·	2.2 km	MPC · JPL
159483	2000 SO_{170}	—	September 24, 2000	Socorro	LINEAR	EUN	2.1 km	MPC · JPL
159484	2000 SS_{232}	—	September 30, 2000	Socorro	LINEAR	BAR	2.0 km	MPC · JPL
159485	2000 SX_{238}	—	September 26, 2000	Socorro	LINEAR	·	2.3 km	MPC · JPL
159486	2000 SY_{252}	—	September 24, 2000	Socorro	LINEAR	·	1.9 km	MPC · JPL
159487	2000 SD_{304}	—	September 30, 2000	Socorro	LINEAR	·	4.8 km	MPC · JPL
159488	2000 SB_{306}	—	September 30, 2000	Socorro	LINEAR	PHO	3.5 km	MPC · JPL
159489	2000 SJ_{334}	—	September 26, 2000	Haleakala	NEAT	·	2.0 km	MPC · JPL
159490	2000 TM_{29}	—	October 3, 2000	Socorro	LINEAR	·	2.2 km	MPC · JPL
159491	2000 TZ_{29}	—	October 4, 2000	Socorro	LINEAR	HNS	4.0 km	MPC · JPL
159492	2000 TN_{43}	—	October 1, 2000	Socorro	LINEAR	ERI	3.2 km	MPC · JPL
159493	2000 UA	—	October 17, 2000	Socorro	LINEAR	·	3.3 km	MPC · JPL
159494	2000 UT_{10}	—	October 24, 2000	Socorro	LINEAR	·	3.9 km	MPC · JPL
159495	2000 UV_{16}	—	October 30, 2000	Socorro	LINEAR	AMO +1km	1.1 km	MPC · JPL
159496	2000 UV_{17}	—	October 24, 2000	Socorro	LINEAR	·	2.2 km	MPC · JPL
159497	2000 UV_{23}	—	October 24, 2000	Socorro	LINEAR	(5)	3.1 km	MPC · JPL
159498	2000 UJ_{26}	—	October 24, 2000	Socorro	LINEAR	·	4.1 km	MPC · JPL
159499	2000 UH_{38}	—	October 24, 2000	Socorro	LINEAR	(5)	2.2 km	MPC · JPL
159500	2000 UR_{46}	—	October 24, 2000	Socorro	LINEAR	HNS	2.2 km	MPC · JPL

== 159501–159600 ==
back to top

Designation			Discovery			Properties		Ref
Permanent	Provisional	Named after	Date	Site	Discoverer(s)	Category	Diam.	Ref
159501	2000 UB_{54}	—	October 24, 2000	Socorro	LINEAR	·	3.4 km	MPC · JPL
159502	2000 WW_{31}	—	November 20, 2000	Socorro	LINEAR	·	2.7 km	MPC · JPL
159503	2000 WQ_{44}	—	November 21, 2000	Socorro	LINEAR	·	2.1 km	MPC · JPL
159504	2000 WO_{67}	—	November 27, 2000	Socorro	LINEAR	APO +1km · PHA	2.3 km	MPC · JPL
159505	2000 WP_{77}	—	November 20, 2000	Socorro	LINEAR	·	1.9 km	MPC · JPL
159506	2000 WU_{108}	—	November 20, 2000	Socorro	LINEAR	·	2.6 km	MPC · JPL
159507	2000 WT_{151}	—	November 29, 2000	Haleakala	NEAT	·	2.7 km	MPC · JPL
159508	2000 XC_{20}	—	December 4, 2000	Socorro	LINEAR	·	2.6 km	MPC · JPL
159509	2000 XX_{21}	—	December 4, 2000	Socorro	LINEAR	·	2.9 km	MPC · JPL
159510	2000 XJ_{40}	—	December 5, 2000	Socorro	LINEAR	·	7.7 km	MPC · JPL
159511	2000 YG_{30}	—	December 30, 2000	Haleakala	NEAT	·	4.2 km	MPC · JPL
159512	2000 YR_{106}	—	December 30, 2000	Socorro	LINEAR	·	5.6 km	MPC · JPL
159513	2000 YF_{111}	—	December 30, 2000	Socorro	LINEAR	·	3.9 km	MPC · JPL
159514	2001 CS_{43}	—	February 3, 2001	Socorro	LINEAR	·	5.8 km	MPC · JPL
159515	2001 DD_{39}	—	February 19, 2001	Socorro	LINEAR	·	2.6 km	MPC · JPL
159516	2001 DK_{82}	—	February 22, 2001	Kitt Peak	Spacewatch	·	5.1 km	MPC · JPL
159517	2001 EK_{10}	—	March 2, 2001	Anderson Mesa	LONEOS	·	5.5 km	MPC · JPL
159518	2001 FF_{7}	—	March 19, 2001	Anderson Mesa	LONEOS	AMO +1km	1.8 km	MPC · JPL
159519	2001 FK_{13}	—	March 19, 2001	Anderson Mesa	LONEOS	HYG	5.4 km	MPC · JPL
159520	2001 FM_{66}	—	March 19, 2001	Socorro	LINEAR	·	4.3 km	MPC · JPL
159521	2001 FD_{69}	—	March 19, 2001	Socorro	LINEAR	·	5.4 km	MPC · JPL
159522	2001 FE_{72}	—	March 19, 2001	Socorro	LINEAR	·	7.4 km	MPC · JPL
159523	2001 FS_{82}	—	March 23, 2001	Socorro	LINEAR	EUP	6.7 km	MPC · JPL
159524	2001 FO_{96}	—	March 16, 2001	Socorro	LINEAR	EOS	3.4 km	MPC · JPL
159525	2001 FD_{117}	—	March 19, 2001	Socorro	LINEAR	EUP	7.0 km	MPC · JPL
159526	2001 FB_{121}	—	March 26, 2001	Socorro	LINEAR	HYG	5.3 km	MPC · JPL
159527	2001 FQ_{172}	—	March 25, 2001	Anderson Mesa	LONEOS	·	7.5 km	MPC · JPL
159528	2001 FM_{175}	—	March 31, 2001	Anderson Mesa	LONEOS	·	5.3 km	MPC · JPL
159529	2001 FO_{176}	—	March 16, 2001	Socorro	LINEAR	·	6.9 km	MPC · JPL
159530	2001 FD_{189}	—	March 16, 2001	Socorro	LINEAR	·	5.2 km	MPC · JPL
159531	2001 HO_{13}	—	April 18, 2001	Socorro	LINEAR	VER	6.7 km	MPC · JPL
159532	2001 HJ_{18}	—	April 21, 2001	Socorro	LINEAR	EUP	7.5 km	MPC · JPL
159533	2001 HH_{31}	—	April 25, 2001	Anderson Mesa	LONEOS	AMO +1km	1.0 km	MPC · JPL
159534	2001 HM_{42}	—	April 16, 2001	Socorro	LINEAR	·	5.3 km	MPC · JPL
159535	2001 HA_{57}	—	April 25, 2001	Anderson Mesa	LONEOS	·	5.1 km	MPC · JPL
159536	2001 OD_{73}	—	July 21, 2001	Anderson Mesa	LONEOS	·	1.7 km	MPC · JPL
159537	2001 OT_{84}	—	July 19, 2001	Anderson Mesa	LONEOS	·	4.8 km	MPC · JPL
159538	2001 OE_{87}	—	July 29, 2001	Palomar	NEAT	·	1.1 km	MPC · JPL
159539	2001 PL_{3}	—	August 5, 2001	Palomar	NEAT	·	9.4 km	MPC · JPL
159540	2001 QL_{55}	—	August 16, 2001	Socorro	LINEAR	·	2.1 km	MPC · JPL
159541	2001 QU_{236}	—	August 24, 2001	Socorro	LINEAR	·	2.6 km	MPC · JPL
159542	2001 QN_{294}	—	August 24, 2001	Socorro	LINEAR	·	1.8 km	MPC · JPL
159543	2001 RW_{63}	—	September 11, 2001	Desert Eagle	W. K. Y. Yeung	·	1.1 km	MPC · JPL
159544	2001 RP_{76}	—	September 10, 2001	Socorro	LINEAR	·	1.6 km	MPC · JPL
159545	2001 RL_{121}	—	September 12, 2001	Socorro	LINEAR	·	820 m	MPC · JPL
159546	2001 SK_{26}	—	September 16, 2001	Socorro	LINEAR	·	860 m	MPC · JPL
159547	2001 SW_{65}	—	September 17, 2001	Socorro	LINEAR	·	960 m	MPC · JPL
159548	2001 SB_{72}	—	September 17, 2001	Socorro	LINEAR	·	940 m	MPC · JPL
159549	2001 SN_{91}	—	September 20, 2001	Socorro	LINEAR	·	1.2 km	MPC · JPL
159550	2001 SM_{127}	—	September 16, 2001	Socorro	LINEAR	3:2	9.0 km	MPC · JPL
159551	2001 SM_{176}	—	September 16, 2001	Socorro	LINEAR	·	1.1 km	MPC · JPL
159552	2001 SK_{232}	—	September 19, 2001	Socorro	LINEAR	·	960 m	MPC · JPL
159553	2001 SB_{236}	—	September 19, 2001	Socorro	LINEAR	·	2.7 km	MPC · JPL
159554	2001 SZ_{257}	—	September 20, 2001	Socorro	LINEAR	3:2	8.1 km	MPC · JPL
159555	2001 SJ_{276}	—	September 27, 2001	Socorro	LINEAR	AMO	650 m	MPC · JPL
159556	2001 SG_{350}	—	September 20, 2001	Socorro	LINEAR	·	1.1 km	MPC · JPL
159557	2001 TF_{6}	—	October 10, 2001	Palomar	NEAT	·	1.6 km	MPC · JPL
159558	2001 TA_{23}	—	October 13, 2001	Socorro	LINEAR	·	1.7 km	MPC · JPL
159559	2001 TF_{70}	—	October 13, 2001	Socorro	LINEAR	·	1.0 km	MPC · JPL
159560	2001 TO_{103}	—	October 14, 2001	Socorro	LINEAR	AMO +1km	1.2 km	MPC · JPL
159561	2001 TP_{190}	—	October 14, 2001	Socorro	LINEAR	V	1.1 km	MPC · JPL
159562	2001 TS_{237}	—	October 10, 2001	Palomar	NEAT	·	1.1 km	MPC · JPL
159563	2001 TJ_{240}	—	October 11, 2001	Socorro	LINEAR	PHO	1.4 km	MPC · JPL
159564	2001 UJ_{19}	—	October 16, 2001	Palomar	NEAT	V	1.5 km	MPC · JPL
159565	2001 UK_{21}	—	October 17, 2001	Socorro	LINEAR	·	2.5 km	MPC · JPL
159566	2001 UU_{30}	—	October 16, 2001	Socorro	LINEAR	V	930 m	MPC · JPL
159567	2001 US_{64}	—	October 18, 2001	Socorro	LINEAR	·	1.7 km	MPC · JPL
159568	2001 UE_{107}	—	October 20, 2001	Socorro	LINEAR	V	1.0 km	MPC · JPL
159569	2001 UD_{163}	—	October 23, 2001	Socorro	LINEAR	fast	2.2 km	MPC · JPL
159570	2001 UD_{190}	—	October 18, 2001	Palomar	NEAT	·	1.5 km	MPC · JPL
159571	2001 VM_{4}	—	November 9, 2001	Socorro	LINEAR	·	1.2 km	MPC · JPL
159572	2001 VO_{4}	—	November 10, 2001	Socorro	LINEAR	·	1.3 km	MPC · JPL
159573	2001 VB_{8}	—	November 9, 2001	Socorro	LINEAR	·	1.8 km	MPC · JPL
159574	2001 VE_{8}	—	November 9, 2001	Socorro	LINEAR	·	1.2 km	MPC · JPL
159575	2001 VZ_{30}	—	November 9, 2001	Socorro	LINEAR	·	1.9 km	MPC · JPL
159576	2001 VK_{40}	—	November 9, 2001	Socorro	LINEAR	·	1.3 km	MPC · JPL
159577	2001 VE_{65}	—	November 10, 2001	Socorro	LINEAR	·	1.3 km	MPC · JPL
159578	2001 VX_{72}	—	November 12, 2001	Kitt Peak	Spacewatch	·	1.7 km	MPC · JPL
159579	2001 VM_{81}	—	November 13, 2001	Haleakala	NEAT	·	2.6 km	MPC · JPL
159580	2001 VF_{102}	—	November 12, 2001	Socorro	LINEAR	·	1.5 km	MPC · JPL
159581	2001 WO	—	November 16, 2001	Kitt Peak	Spacewatch	·	3.0 km	MPC · JPL
159582	2001 XE_{31}	—	December 11, 2001	Socorro	LINEAR	·	2.6 km	MPC · JPL
159583	2001 XK_{50}	—	December 10, 2001	Socorro	LINEAR	·	1.9 km	MPC · JPL
159584	2001 XT_{63}	—	December 10, 2001	Socorro	LINEAR	·	1.4 km	MPC · JPL
159585	2001 XK_{65}	—	December 10, 2001	Socorro	LINEAR	·	1.8 km	MPC · JPL
159586	2001 XF_{67}	—	December 10, 2001	Socorro	LINEAR	·	1.9 km	MPC · JPL
159587	2001 XG_{73}	—	December 11, 2001	Socorro	LINEAR	·	2.2 km	MPC · JPL
159588	2001 XC_{106}	—	December 10, 2001	Socorro	LINEAR	NYS	2.2 km	MPC · JPL
159589	2001 XK_{115}	—	December 13, 2001	Socorro	LINEAR	·	2.6 km	MPC · JPL
159590	2001 XX_{121}	—	December 14, 2001	Socorro	LINEAR	·	1.3 km	MPC · JPL
159591	2001 XD_{146}	—	December 14, 2001	Socorro	LINEAR	·	1.5 km	MPC · JPL
159592	2001 XT_{164}	—	December 14, 2001	Socorro	LINEAR	·	1.8 km	MPC · JPL
159593	2001 XR_{167}	—	December 14, 2001	Socorro	LINEAR	MAS · fast	1.2 km	MPC · JPL
159594	2001 XP_{192}	—	December 14, 2001	Socorro	LINEAR	·	2.2 km	MPC · JPL
159595	2001 XF_{211}	—	December 11, 2001	Socorro	LINEAR	(5)	1.5 km	MPC · JPL
159596	2001 XT_{212}	—	December 11, 2001	Socorro	LINEAR	·	1.8 km	MPC · JPL
159597	2001 XV_{217}	—	December 14, 2001	Socorro	LINEAR	·	1.8 km	MPC · JPL
159598	2001 XJ_{232}	—	December 15, 2001	Socorro	LINEAR	·	2.3 km	MPC · JPL
159599	2001 XW_{243}	—	December 15, 2001	Socorro	LINEAR	·	2.1 km	MPC · JPL
159600	2001 XK_{252}	—	December 14, 2001	Socorro	LINEAR	(5)	3.1 km	MPC · JPL

== 159601–159700 ==
back to top

Designation			Discovery			Properties		Ref
Permanent	Provisional	Named after	Date	Site	Discoverer(s)	Category	Diam.	Ref
159601	2001 YY_{7}	—	December 17, 2001	Socorro	LINEAR	·	2.2 km	MPC · JPL
159602	2001 YM_{11}	—	December 17, 2001	Socorro	LINEAR	MAS	1.5 km	MPC · JPL
159603	2001 YO_{15}	—	December 17, 2001	Socorro	LINEAR	·	950 m	MPC · JPL
159604	2001 YZ_{29}	—	December 18, 2001	Socorro	LINEAR	V	970 m	MPC · JPL
159605	2001 YB_{97}	—	December 17, 2001	Socorro	LINEAR	·	1.0 km	MPC · JPL
159606	2001 YN_{105}	—	December 17, 2001	Socorro	LINEAR	·	2.5 km	MPC · JPL
159607	2001 YO_{115}	—	December 17, 2001	Socorro	LINEAR	BAP	2.1 km	MPC · JPL
159608	2002 AC_{2}	—	January 6, 2002	Socorro	LINEAR	AMO +1km	1.7 km	MPC · JPL
159609	2002 AQ_{3}	—	January 8, 2002	Palomar	NEAT	AMO +1km	1.3 km	MPC · JPL
159610	2002 AJ_{13}	—	January 12, 2002	Ametlla de Mar	J. Nomen	·	4.5 km	MPC · JPL
159611	2002 AX_{15}	—	January 4, 2002	Haleakala	NEAT	·	5.6 km	MPC · JPL
159612	2002 AV_{17}	—	January 9, 2002	Socorro	LINEAR	·	1.5 km	MPC · JPL
159613	2002 AX_{18}	—	January 13, 2002	Oizumi	T. Kobayashi	(194)	3.8 km	MPC · JPL
159614	2002 AF_{37}	—	January 9, 2002	Socorro	LINEAR	·	3.5 km	MPC · JPL
159615	2002 AA_{57}	—	January 9, 2002	Socorro	LINEAR	(5)	2.0 km	MPC · JPL
159616	2002 AR_{75}	—	January 8, 2002	Socorro	LINEAR	·	1.9 km	MPC · JPL
159617	2002 AV_{98}	—	January 8, 2002	Socorro	LINEAR	NYS	2.0 km	MPC · JPL
159618	2002 AM_{109}	—	January 9, 2002	Socorro	LINEAR	V	1.4 km	MPC · JPL
159619	2002 AU_{109}	—	January 9, 2002	Socorro	LINEAR	·	1.8 km	MPC · JPL
159620	2002 AC_{118}	—	January 9, 2002	Socorro	LINEAR	·	2.4 km	MPC · JPL
159621	2002 AN_{128}	—	January 14, 2002	Desert Eagle	W. K. Y. Yeung	·	2.9 km	MPC · JPL
159622	2002 AP_{134}	—	January 9, 2002	Socorro	LINEAR	·	2.4 km	MPC · JPL
159623	2002 AD_{152}	—	January 14, 2002	Socorro	LINEAR	·	2.8 km	MPC · JPL
159624	2002 AR_{153}	—	January 14, 2002	Socorro	LINEAR	·	3.4 km	MPC · JPL
159625	2002 AC_{184}	—	January 6, 2002	Anderson Mesa	LONEOS	·	2.9 km	MPC · JPL
159626	2002 BD_{12}	—	January 19, 2002	Socorro	LINEAR	·	2.2 km	MPC · JPL
159627	2002 BC_{29}	—	January 20, 2002	Anderson Mesa	LONEOS	·	1.9 km	MPC · JPL
159628	2002 BP_{30}	—	January 21, 2002	Anderson Mesa	LONEOS	EUN	2.1 km	MPC · JPL
159629 Brunszvik	2002 BT_{31}	Brunszvik	January 16, 2002	Piszkéstető	K. Sárneczky, Z. Heiner	·	1.3 km	MPC · JPL
159630	2002 CJ_{8}	—	February 4, 2002	Palomar	NEAT	·	2.4 km	MPC · JPL
159631	2002 CA_{13}	—	February 8, 2002	Fountain Hills	C. W. Juels, P. R. Holvorcem	·	5.9 km	MPC · JPL
159632	2002 CB_{18}	—	February 6, 2002	Socorro	LINEAR	(5)	2.1 km	MPC · JPL
159633	2002 CY_{21}	—	February 5, 2002	Palomar	NEAT	L4	20 km	MPC · JPL
159634	2002 CF_{28}	—	February 6, 2002	Socorro	LINEAR	·	3.2 km	MPC · JPL
159635	2002 CZ_{46}	—	February 11, 2002	Haleakala	NEAT	AMO +1km	830 m	MPC · JPL
159636	2002 CU_{48}	—	February 3, 2002	Haleakala	NEAT	·	3.7 km	MPC · JPL
159637	2002 CT_{54}	—	February 7, 2002	Socorro	LINEAR	NYS ·	3.1 km	MPC · JPL
159638	2002 CO_{87}	—	February 7, 2002	Socorro	LINEAR	·	3.3 km	MPC · JPL
159639	2002 CJ_{93}	—	February 7, 2002	Socorro	LINEAR	·	1.6 km	MPC · JPL
159640	2002 CB_{96}	—	February 7, 2002	Socorro	LINEAR	·	1.9 km	MPC · JPL
159641	2002 CW_{110}	—	February 7, 2002	Socorro	LINEAR	·	3.1 km	MPC · JPL
159642	2002 CN_{129}	—	February 7, 2002	Socorro	LINEAR	·	3.3 km	MPC · JPL
159643	2002 CG_{133}	—	February 7, 2002	Socorro	LINEAR	·	3.9 km	MPC · JPL
159644	2002 CC_{162}	—	February 8, 2002	Socorro	LINEAR	ERI	4.3 km	MPC · JPL
159645	2002 CT_{167}	—	February 8, 2002	Socorro	LINEAR	·	3.0 km	MPC · JPL
159646	2002 CC_{180}	—	February 10, 2002	Socorro	LINEAR	·	1.9 km	MPC · JPL
159647	2002 CK_{188}	—	February 10, 2002	Socorro	LINEAR	·	1.8 km	MPC · JPL
159648	2002 CC_{209}	—	February 10, 2002	Socorro	LINEAR	·	1.8 km	MPC · JPL
159649	2002 CY_{245}	—	February 15, 2002	Haleakala	NEAT	RAF	1.5 km	MPC · JPL
159650	2002 CW_{255}	—	February 6, 2002	Palomar	NEAT	·	1.7 km	MPC · JPL
159651	2002 CZ_{276}	—	February 7, 2002	Socorro	LINEAR	PHO	2.7 km	MPC · JPL
159652	2002 CO_{291}	—	February 10, 2002	Socorro	LINEAR	·	2.0 km	MPC · JPL
159653	2002 CK_{301}	—	February 11, 2002	Socorro	LINEAR	·	2.6 km	MPC · JPL
159654	2002 DW_{13}	—	February 16, 2002	Haleakala	NEAT	·	2.6 km	MPC · JPL
159655	2002 DR_{19}	—	February 21, 2002	Kvistaberg	Uppsala-DLR Asteroid Survey	GEF	2.2 km	MPC · JPL
159656	2002 ES_{29}	—	March 9, 2002	Socorro	LINEAR	·	2.6 km	MPC · JPL
159657	2002 ER_{46}	—	March 11, 2002	Haleakala	NEAT	·	3.8 km	MPC · JPL
159658	2002 EV_{56}	—	March 13, 2002	Socorro	LINEAR	L4	20 km	MPC · JPL
159659	2002 EE_{84}	—	March 9, 2002	Socorro	LINEAR	·	2.1 km	MPC · JPL
159660	2002 EW_{90}	—	March 12, 2002	Socorro	LINEAR	·	3.2 km	MPC · JPL
159661	2002 EV_{99}	—	March 5, 2002	Anderson Mesa	LONEOS	·	2.2 km	MPC · JPL
159662	2002 EY_{124}	—	March 12, 2002	Palomar	NEAT	MAS	1.8 km	MPC · JPL
159663	2002 EY_{132}	—	March 13, 2002	Palomar	NEAT	·	2.1 km	MPC · JPL
159664	2002 EK_{141}	—	March 12, 2002	Palomar	NEAT	·	2.1 km	MPC · JPL
159665	2002 FW_{35}	—	March 21, 2002	Socorro	LINEAR	BAR	2.1 km	MPC · JPL
159666	2002 GX_{14}	—	April 15, 2002	Socorro	LINEAR	·	3.8 km	MPC · JPL
159667	2002 GT_{15}	—	April 15, 2002	Socorro	LINEAR	·	3.2 km	MPC · JPL
159668	2002 GP_{20}	—	April 14, 2002	Socorro	LINEAR	·	3.4 km	MPC · JPL
159669	2002 GY_{73}	—	April 9, 2002	Anderson Mesa	LONEOS	HOF	5.2 km	MPC · JPL
159670	2002 GX_{83}	—	April 10, 2002	Socorro	LINEAR	GEF	2.6 km	MPC · JPL
159671	2002 GU_{94}	—	April 9, 2002	Socorro	LINEAR	HOF	4.4 km	MPC · JPL
159672	2002 GW_{109}	—	April 9, 2002	Socorro	LINEAR	·	4.7 km	MPC · JPL
159673	2002 GR_{128}	—	April 12, 2002	Socorro	LINEAR	·	2.2 km	MPC · JPL
159674	2002 GO_{152}	—	April 12, 2002	Palomar	NEAT	·	3.6 km	MPC · JPL
159675	2002 GW_{162}	—	April 14, 2002	Palomar	NEAT	·	2.7 km	MPC · JPL
159676	2002 HH_{3}	—	April 16, 2002	Socorro	LINEAR	·	4.0 km	MPC · JPL
159677	2002 HQ_{11}	—	April 22, 2002	Palomar	NEAT	APO	460 m	MPC · JPL
159678	2002 JA_{17}	—	May 7, 2002	Palomar	NEAT	MRX	1.9 km	MPC · JPL
159679	2002 JX_{24}	—	May 8, 2002	Socorro	LINEAR	·	4.3 km	MPC · JPL
159680	2002 JY_{60}	—	May 11, 2002	Kitt Peak	Spacewatch	AEO	1.7 km	MPC · JPL
159681	2002 JB_{76}	—	May 11, 2002	Socorro	LINEAR	·	4.5 km	MPC · JPL
159682	2002 JD_{122}	—	May 6, 2002	Anderson Mesa	LONEOS	ADE	5.7 km	MPC · JPL
159683	2002 JJ_{148}	—	May 14, 2002	Needville	A. Cruz, J. Dellinger	·	3.3 km	MPC · JPL
159684	2002 KC	—	May 16, 2002	Fountain Hills	Hills, Fountain	·	4.4 km	MPC · JPL
159685	2002 LP_{3}	—	June 5, 2002	Socorro	LINEAR	H	1.1 km	MPC · JPL
159686	2002 LB_{6}	—	June 7, 2002	Socorro	LINEAR	APO +1km	1.8 km	MPC · JPL
159687	2002 LG_{53}	—	June 8, 2002	Socorro	LINEAR	TIR	5.3 km	MPC · JPL
159688	2002 LE_{58}	—	June 12, 2002	Palomar	NEAT	·	4.9 km	MPC · JPL
159689	2002 MZ_{2}	—	June 23, 2002	Palomar	NEAT	·	6.0 km	MPC · JPL
159690	2002 NK_{2}	—	July 4, 2002	Palomar	NEAT	THM	3.8 km	MPC · JPL
159691	2002 NB_{9}	—	July 1, 2002	Palomar	NEAT	·	6.1 km	MPC · JPL
159692	2002 OV_{20}	—	July 22, 2002	Palomar	NEAT	·	5.7 km	MPC · JPL
159693	2002 PK_{4}	—	August 4, 2002	Palomar	NEAT	·	6.0 km	MPC · JPL
159694	2002 PS_{22}	—	August 6, 2002	Palomar	NEAT	·	3.6 km	MPC · JPL
159695	2002 PO_{43}	—	August 11, 2002	Socorro	LINEAR	H	950 m	MPC · JPL
159696	2002 PS_{85}	—	August 12, 2002	Socorro	LINEAR	·	9.1 km	MPC · JPL
159697	2002 PO_{94}	—	August 12, 2002	Haleakala	NEAT	·	4.2 km	MPC · JPL
159698	2002 PV_{106}	—	August 12, 2002	Socorro	LINEAR	EOS	3.5 km	MPC · JPL
159699	2002 PQ_{142}	—	August 12, 2002	Socorro	LINEAR	APO +1km	1.1 km	MPC · JPL
159700	2002 PS_{160}	—	August 8, 2002	Palomar	S. F. Hönig	·	4.5 km	MPC · JPL

== 159701–159800 ==
back to top

Designation			Discovery			Properties		Ref
Permanent	Provisional	Named after	Date	Site	Discoverer(s)	Category	Diam.	Ref
159701	2002 QD_{23}	—	August 27, 2002	Palomar	NEAT	CYB	4.9 km	MPC · JPL
159702	2002 RY_{70}	—	September 4, 2002	Palomar	NEAT	·	5.7 km	MPC · JPL
159703	2002 RV_{109}	—	September 6, 2002	Socorro	LINEAR	·	7.2 km	MPC · JPL
159704	2002 RA_{187}	—	September 12, 2002	Palomar	NEAT	·	8.5 km	MPC · JPL
159705	2002 RU_{244}	—	September 15, 2002	Palomar	NEAT	·	4.2 km	MPC · JPL
159706	2002 SK_{50}	—	September 30, 2002	Haleakala	NEAT	·	6.7 km	MPC · JPL
159707	2002 TK_{138}	—	October 4, 2002	Anderson Mesa	LONEOS	·	7.1 km	MPC · JPL
159708	2002 TK_{179}	—	October 13, 2002	Palomar	NEAT	·	8.1 km	MPC · JPL
159709	2002 TZ_{191}	—	October 5, 2002	Anderson Mesa	LONEOS	·	8.5 km	MPC · JPL
159710	2002 TQ_{285}	—	October 10, 2002	Socorro	LINEAR	·	9.9 km	MPC · JPL
159711	2002 TV_{300}	—	October 15, 2002	Socorro	LINEAR	·	7.2 km	MPC · JPL
159712	2002 VN_{27}	—	November 5, 2002	Palomar	NEAT	·	5.3 km	MPC · JPL
159713	2002 VF_{54}	—	November 6, 2002	Socorro	LINEAR	·	5.9 km	MPC · JPL
159714	2002 VS_{69}	—	November 7, 2002	Socorro	LINEAR	·	7.4 km	MPC · JPL
159715	2002 VD_{110}	—	November 12, 2002	Socorro	LINEAR	H	1.3 km	MPC · JPL
159716	2002 YP_{31}	—	December 31, 2002	Socorro	LINEAR	·	2.1 km	MPC · JPL
159717	2003 AO_{8}	—	January 5, 2003	Tenagra II	P. R. Holvorcem, M. Schwartz	·	1.0 km	MPC · JPL
159718	2003 AD_{51}	—	January 5, 2003	Socorro	LINEAR	·	2.5 km	MPC · JPL
159719	2003 AW_{65}	—	January 7, 2003	Socorro	LINEAR	·	2.5 km	MPC · JPL
159720	2003 AJ_{90}	—	January 5, 2003	Socorro	LINEAR	·	1.7 km	MPC · JPL
159721	2003 BL_{19}	—	January 26, 2003	Anderson Mesa	LONEOS	·	3.2 km	MPC · JPL
159722	2003 BQ_{27}	—	January 26, 2003	Anderson Mesa	LONEOS	ERI	2.4 km	MPC · JPL
159723	2003 BV_{43}	—	January 27, 2003	Socorro	LINEAR	·	1.3 km	MPC · JPL
159724	2003 BQ_{60}	—	January 27, 2003	Palomar	NEAT	·	1.8 km	MPC · JPL
159725	2003 BV_{61}	—	January 28, 2003	Socorro	LINEAR	·	2.2 km	MPC · JPL
159726	2003 BX_{83}	—	January 31, 2003	Socorro	LINEAR	·	1.6 km	MPC · JPL
159727	2003 BY_{84}	—	January 31, 2003	Socorro	LINEAR	·	1.4 km	MPC · JPL
159728	2003 BU_{86}	—	January 26, 2003	Anderson Mesa	LONEOS	PHO	1.4 km	MPC · JPL
159729	2003 DW_{5}	—	February 21, 2003	Palomar	NEAT	·	1.9 km	MPC · JPL
159730	2003 DL_{14}	—	February 24, 2003	Haleakala	NEAT	·	1.6 km	MPC · JPL
159731	2003 DP_{16}	—	February 21, 2003	Palomar	NEAT	·	1.2 km	MPC · JPL
159732	2003 DP_{22}	—	February 24, 2003	Bergisch Gladbach	W. Bickel	·	2.5 km	MPC · JPL
159733	2003 EK_{6}	—	March 6, 2003	Anderson Mesa	LONEOS	NYS	1.8 km	MPC · JPL
159734	2003 EU_{10}	—	March 6, 2003	Socorro	LINEAR	·	2.3 km	MPC · JPL
159735	2003 EO_{11}	—	March 6, 2003	Anderson Mesa	LONEOS	NYS	1.6 km	MPC · JPL
159736	2003 ER_{17}	—	March 5, 2003	Socorro	LINEAR	ERI	3.4 km	MPC · JPL
159737	2003 EH_{24}	—	March 6, 2003	Socorro	LINEAR	NYS	1.5 km	MPC · JPL
159738	2003 EC_{38}	—	March 8, 2003	Anderson Mesa	LONEOS	·	2.1 km	MPC · JPL
159739	2003 EF_{44}	—	March 7, 2003	Socorro	LINEAR	·	1.4 km	MPC · JPL
159740	2003 EG_{48}	—	March 9, 2003	Anderson Mesa	LONEOS	·	2.3 km	MPC · JPL
159741	2003 EO_{49}	—	March 10, 2003	Anderson Mesa	LONEOS	·	1.4 km	MPC · JPL
159742	2003 EQ_{50}	—	March 10, 2003	Anderson Mesa	LONEOS	NYS	1.8 km	MPC · JPL
159743 Kluk	2003 FW_{1}	Kluk	March 23, 2003	Kleť	KLENOT	NYS	1.5 km	MPC · JPL
159744	2003 FS_{15}	—	March 23, 2003	Kitt Peak	Spacewatch	NYS	1.6 km	MPC · JPL
159745	2003 FX_{18}	—	March 24, 2003	Kitt Peak	Spacewatch	·	1.8 km	MPC · JPL
159746	2003 FD_{31}	—	March 23, 2003	Palomar	NEAT	·	1.5 km	MPC · JPL
159747	2003 FW_{42}	—	March 23, 2003	Catalina	CSS	·	2.1 km	MPC · JPL
159748	2003 FN_{52}	—	March 25, 2003	Palomar	NEAT	·	2.2 km	MPC · JPL
159749	2003 FV_{53}	—	March 25, 2003	Haleakala	NEAT	MAS	1.2 km	MPC · JPL
159750	2003 FV_{57}	—	March 26, 2003	Kitt Peak	Spacewatch	·	2.2 km	MPC · JPL
159751	2003 FH_{62}	—	March 26, 2003	Palomar	NEAT	·	3.0 km	MPC · JPL
159752	2003 FS_{68}	—	March 26, 2003	Palomar	NEAT	·	1.9 km	MPC · JPL
159753	2003 FC_{70}	—	March 26, 2003	Kitt Peak	Spacewatch	·	1.0 km	MPC · JPL
159754	2003 FB_{92}	—	March 29, 2003	Anderson Mesa	LONEOS	·	2.0 km	MPC · JPL
159755	2003 FJ_{100}	—	March 31, 2003	Anderson Mesa	LONEOS	·	2.2 km	MPC · JPL
159756	2003 FS_{107}	—	March 30, 2003	Socorro	LINEAR	V	1.2 km	MPC · JPL
159757	2003 FU_{116}	—	March 23, 2003	Kitt Peak	Spacewatch	NYS	2.0 km	MPC · JPL
159758	2003 FZ_{122}	—	March 31, 2003	Cerro Tololo	Deep Lens Survey	·	2.0 km	MPC · JPL
159759	2003 GK	—	April 1, 2003	Socorro	LINEAR	·	1.8 km	MPC · JPL
159760	2003 GA_{1}	—	April 1, 2003	Socorro	LINEAR	·	1.3 km	MPC · JPL
159761	2003 GF_{27}	—	April 6, 2003	Kitt Peak	Spacewatch	NYS	2.1 km	MPC · JPL
159762	2003 GD_{38}	—	April 8, 2003	Socorro	LINEAR	·	2.0 km	MPC · JPL
159763	2003 GW_{46}	—	April 8, 2003	Palomar	NEAT	·	2.2 km	MPC · JPL
159764	2003 GW_{52}	—	April 1, 2003	Catalina	CSS	·	1.8 km	MPC · JPL
159765	2003 HO_{2}	—	April 25, 2003	Socorro	LINEAR	·	1.8 km	MPC · JPL
159766	2003 HN_{8}	—	April 25, 2003	Anderson Mesa	LONEOS	PHO	1.8 km	MPC · JPL
159767	2003 HU_{8}	—	April 24, 2003	Anderson Mesa	LONEOS	·	1.6 km	MPC · JPL
159768	2003 HU_{10}	—	April 24, 2003	Kitt Peak	Spacewatch	·	1.9 km	MPC · JPL
159769	2003 HB_{40}	—	April 29, 2003	Socorro	LINEAR	NYS	1.9 km	MPC · JPL
159770	2003 HJ_{47}	—	April 28, 2003	Socorro	LINEAR	·	6.1 km	MPC · JPL
159771	2003 HL_{47}	—	April 28, 2003	Haleakala	NEAT	·	2.6 km	MPC · JPL
159772	2003 HT_{52}	—	April 29, 2003	Anderson Mesa	LONEOS	MAS	980 m	MPC · JPL
159773	2003 JD_{7}	—	May 1, 2003	Socorro	LINEAR	MAS	1.3 km	MPC · JPL
159774	2003 JM_{10}	—	May 2, 2003	Kitt Peak	Spacewatch	·	2.1 km	MPC · JPL
159775	2003 JA_{15}	—	May 5, 2003	Kitt Peak	Spacewatch	·	1.5 km	MPC · JPL
159776 Eduardoröhl	2003 JR_{17}	Eduardoröhl	May 2, 2003	Mérida	Ferrin, I. R., Leal, C.	·	2.4 km	MPC · JPL
159777	2003 KX	—	May 21, 2003	Reedy Creek	J. Broughton	·	4.7 km	MPC · JPL
159778 Bobshelton	2003 MZ_{1}	Bobshelton	June 24, 2003	Junk Bond	D. Healy	NYS	1.8 km	MPC · JPL
159779	2003 MM_{3}	—	June 25, 2003	Socorro	LINEAR	PHO	2.4 km	MPC · JPL
159780	2003 MV_{6}	—	June 26, 2003	Haleakala	NEAT	·	3.4 km	MPC · JPL
159781	2003 MZ_{7}	—	June 28, 2003	Socorro	LINEAR	·	4.2 km	MPC · JPL
159782	2003 MN_{9}	—	June 29, 2003	Socorro	LINEAR	·	2.4 km	MPC · JPL
159783	2003 MY_{9}	—	June 29, 2003	Reedy Creek	J. Broughton	·	6.1 km	MPC · JPL
159784	2003 MD_{11}	—	June 26, 2003	Socorro	LINEAR	ADE	5.7 km	MPC · JPL
159785	2003 ND_{6}	—	July 4, 2003	Kitt Peak	Spacewatch	·	2.7 km	MPC · JPL
159786	2003 NL_{8}	—	July 14, 2003	Great Shefford	Birtwhistle, P.	·	2.5 km	MPC · JPL
159787	2003 OH_{19}	—	July 30, 2003	Palomar	NEAT	·	3.1 km	MPC · JPL
159788	2003 OF_{23}	—	July 30, 2003	Campo Imperatore	CINEOS	·	2.5 km	MPC · JPL
159789	2003 PG_{1}	—	August 1, 2003	Haleakala	NEAT	·	3.5 km	MPC · JPL
159790	2003 PU_{11}	—	August 1, 2003	Socorro	LINEAR	·	3.2 km	MPC · JPL
159791	2003 QQ_{25}	—	August 22, 2003	Palomar	NEAT	(5)	2.0 km	MPC · JPL
159792	2003 QG_{63}	—	August 23, 2003	Socorro	LINEAR	GAL	2.9 km	MPC · JPL
159793	2003 QJ_{64}	—	August 23, 2003	Socorro	LINEAR	·	2.4 km	MPC · JPL
159794	2003 QQ_{96}	—	August 29, 2003	Haleakala	NEAT	(1547)	2.3 km	MPC · JPL
159795	2003 QN_{105}	—	August 31, 2003	Haleakala	NEAT	·	8.8 km	MPC · JPL
159796	2003 QT_{109}	—	August 26, 2003	Haleakala	NEAT	·	3.9 km	MPC · JPL
159797	2003 QP_{114}	—	August 23, 2003	Palomar	NEAT	·	1.9 km	MPC · JPL
159798	2003 RW_{3}	—	September 1, 2003	Socorro	LINEAR	·	6.1 km	MPC · JPL
159799 Kralice	2003 RF_{14}	Kralice	September 15, 2003	Kleť	KLENOT	·	5.3 km	MPC · JPL
159800	2003 RQ_{15}	—	September 15, 2003	Haleakala	NEAT	·	3.8 km	MPC · JPL

== 159801–159900 ==
back to top

Designation			Discovery			Properties		Ref
Permanent	Provisional	Named after	Date	Site	Discoverer(s)	Category	Diam.	Ref
159801	2003 RT_{16}	—	September 15, 2003	Palomar	NEAT	·	3.9 km	MPC · JPL
159802	2003 RN_{17}	—	September 15, 2003	Palomar	NEAT	·	6.0 km	MPC · JPL
159803	2003 RW_{21}	—	September 13, 2003	Haleakala	NEAT	KOR	2.3 km	MPC · JPL
159804	2003 SN_{13}	—	September 16, 2003	Kitt Peak	Spacewatch	·	3.7 km	MPC · JPL
159805	2003 SG_{29}	—	September 18, 2003	Palomar	NEAT	·	4.9 km	MPC · JPL
159806	2003 SG_{51}	—	September 18, 2003	Palomar	NEAT	·	6.9 km	MPC · JPL
159807	2003 SB_{52}	—	September 18, 2003	Palomar	NEAT	·	3.8 km	MPC · JPL
159808	2003 SL_{71}	—	September 18, 2003	Kitt Peak	Spacewatch	·	5.4 km	MPC · JPL
159809	2003 SQ_{77}	—	September 19, 2003	Kitt Peak	Spacewatch	·	4.7 km	MPC · JPL
159810	2003 SJ_{89}	—	September 18, 2003	Palomar	NEAT	·	4.4 km	MPC · JPL
159811	2003 SJ_{148}	—	September 16, 2003	Socorro	LINEAR	·	4.2 km	MPC · JPL
159812	2003 SG_{186}	—	September 22, 2003	Anderson Mesa	LONEOS	·	6.1 km	MPC · JPL
159813	2003 SY_{194}	—	September 20, 2003	Palomar	NEAT	URS	6.0 km	MPC · JPL
159814 Saguaro	2003 SS_{217}	Saguaro	September 27, 2003	Kleť	KLENOT	·	3.4 km	MPC · JPL
159815	2003 SF_{220}	—	September 26, 2003	Goodricke-Pigott	R. A. Tucker	·	7.5 km	MPC · JPL
159816	2003 SJ_{232}	—	September 24, 2003	Haleakala	NEAT	·	5.8 km	MPC · JPL
159817	2003 SE_{234}	—	September 25, 2003	Palomar	NEAT	·	3.2 km	MPC · JPL
159818	2003 SM_{264}	—	September 28, 2003	Socorro	LINEAR	·	5.0 km	MPC · JPL
159819	2003 SX_{284}	—	September 20, 2003	Socorro	LINEAR	DOR	4.3 km	MPC · JPL
159820	2003 SY_{286}	—	September 21, 2003	Palomar	NEAT	·	4.9 km	MPC · JPL
159821	2003 SS_{294}	—	September 28, 2003	Socorro	LINEAR	·	4.9 km	MPC · JPL
159822	2003 SR_{303}	—	September 17, 2003	Palomar	NEAT	·	4.1 km	MPC · JPL
159823	2003 SO_{310}	—	September 28, 2003	Anderson Mesa	LONEOS	VER	5.2 km	MPC · JPL
159824	2003 SM_{315}	—	September 28, 2003	Haleakala	NEAT	·	7.6 km	MPC · JPL
159825	2003 SH_{321}	—	September 20, 2003	Kitt Peak	Spacewatch	·	5.2 km	MPC · JPL
159826 Knapp	2003 SF_{331}	Knapp	September 26, 2003	Apache Point	SDSS	·	3.6 km	MPC · JPL
159827 Keithmullen	2003 TD_{2}	Keithmullen	October 4, 2003	Junk Bond	D. Healy	HYG	5.7 km	MPC · JPL
159828	2003 TS_{12}	—	October 15, 2003	Palomar	NEAT	LEO	4.4 km	MPC · JPL
159829	2003 TV_{57}	—	October 15, 2003	Anderson Mesa	LONEOS	EOS	5.7 km	MPC · JPL
159830	2003 UL_{63}	—	October 16, 2003	Palomar	NEAT	·	4.2 km	MPC · JPL
159831	2003 UF_{64}	—	October 16, 2003	Anderson Mesa	LONEOS	·	3.7 km	MPC · JPL
159832	2003 UQ_{64}	—	October 16, 2003	Anderson Mesa	LONEOS	·	7.8 km	MPC · JPL
159833	2003 UL_{90}	—	October 20, 2003	Kitt Peak	Spacewatch	·	5.4 km	MPC · JPL
159834	2003 UL_{117}	—	October 21, 2003	Socorro	LINEAR	·	6.9 km	MPC · JPL
159835	2003 UA_{134}	—	October 20, 2003	Palomar	NEAT	INA	6.7 km	MPC · JPL
159836	2003 UB_{139}	—	October 16, 2003	Palomar	NEAT	EOS	3.4 km	MPC · JPL
159837	2003 UG_{157}	—	October 20, 2003	Socorro	LINEAR	HYG	4.3 km	MPC · JPL
159838	2003 UH_{163}	—	October 21, 2003	Socorro	LINEAR	HYG	3.7 km	MPC · JPL
159839	2003 UL_{171}	—	October 19, 2003	Kitt Peak	Spacewatch	·	3.9 km	MPC · JPL
159840	2003 UL_{247}	—	October 24, 2003	Haleakala	NEAT	HYG	6.2 km	MPC · JPL
159841	2003 UR_{263}	—	October 27, 2003	Socorro	LINEAR	·	6.6 km	MPC · JPL
159842	2003 UF_{282}	—	October 29, 2003	Anderson Mesa	LONEOS	·	4.7 km	MPC · JPL
159843	2003 VA_{6}	—	November 15, 2003	Goodricke-Pigott	R. A. Tucker	·	5.8 km	MPC · JPL
159844	2003 WA_{12}	—	November 18, 2003	Palomar	NEAT	EOS	3.6 km	MPC · JPL
159845	2003 WB_{49}	—	November 19, 2003	Kitt Peak	Spacewatch	·	6.0 km	MPC · JPL
159846	2003 WB_{65}	—	November 19, 2003	Kitt Peak	Spacewatch	·	2.9 km	MPC · JPL
159847	2003 WG_{85}	—	November 20, 2003	Palomar	NEAT	·	7.3 km	MPC · JPL
159848	2003 WS_{153}	—	November 21, 2003	Palomar	NEAT	T_{j} (2.98) · EUP	9.0 km	MPC · JPL
159849	2003 XM_{6}	—	December 3, 2003	Socorro	LINEAR	·	4.6 km	MPC · JPL
159850	2003 YC_{35}	—	December 18, 2003	Haleakala	NEAT	EOS	3.5 km	MPC · JPL
159851	2003 YE_{111}	—	December 17, 2003	Needville	Dillon, W. G., J. Dellinger	HYG	5.6 km	MPC · JPL
159852	2003 YF_{143}	—	December 28, 2003	Socorro	LINEAR	·	3.5 km	MPC · JPL
159853	2004 FK_{4}	—	March 20, 2004	Tenagra II	M. Schwartz, P. R. Holvorcem	H	720 m	MPC · JPL
159854	2004 FT_{15}	—	March 20, 2004	Siding Spring	SSS	H	1.0 km	MPC · JPL
159855	2004 FD_{147}	—	March 30, 2004	Socorro	LINEAR	H	1 km	MPC · JPL
159856	2004 JW_{6}	—	May 13, 2004	Socorro	LINEAR	AMO +1km	900 m	MPC · JPL
159857	2004 LJ_{1}	—	June 10, 2004	Socorro	LINEAR	APO +1km · PHA	3.1 km	MPC · JPL
159858	2004 LK_{16}	—	June 12, 2004	Palomar	NEAT	·	850 m	MPC · JPL
159859	2004 LE_{23}	—	June 15, 2004	Socorro	LINEAR	·	2.0 km	MPC · JPL
159860	2004 PS_{13}	—	August 7, 2004	Palomar	NEAT	·	1.0 km	MPC · JPL
159861	2004 PU_{28}	—	August 6, 2004	Palomar	NEAT	·	1.3 km	MPC · JPL
159862	2004 PP_{33}	—	August 8, 2004	Anderson Mesa	LONEOS	·	2.3 km	MPC · JPL
159863	2004 PD_{50}	—	August 8, 2004	Socorro	LINEAR	·	1.3 km	MPC · JPL
159864	2004 PH_{50}	—	August 8, 2004	Socorro	LINEAR	·	1.4 km	MPC · JPL
159865 Silvialonso	2004 PX_{66}	Silvialonso	August 12, 2004	Begues	Manteca, J.	·	2.3 km	MPC · JPL
159866	2004 PM_{75}	—	August 8, 2004	Anderson Mesa	LONEOS	·	1.9 km	MPC · JPL
159867	2004 PU_{77}	—	August 9, 2004	Socorro	LINEAR	·	1.1 km	MPC · JPL
159868	2004 PS_{91}	—	August 12, 2004	Socorro	LINEAR	·	1.7 km	MPC · JPL
159869	2004 PF_{94}	—	August 10, 2004	Socorro	LINEAR	·	1.4 km	MPC · JPL
159870	2004 PP_{103}	—	August 12, 2004	Socorro	LINEAR	·	1.6 km	MPC · JPL
159871	2004 QF_{17}	—	August 23, 2004	Wise	Wise	·	1.7 km	MPC · JPL
159872	2004 RU_{29}	—	September 7, 2004	Socorro	LINEAR	·	1.5 km	MPC · JPL
159873	2004 RE_{36}	—	September 7, 2004	Socorro	LINEAR	·	2.0 km	MPC · JPL
159874	2004 RS_{53}	—	September 8, 2004	Socorro	LINEAR	·	3.2 km	MPC · JPL
159875	2004 RZ_{58}	—	September 8, 2004	Socorro	LINEAR	V	980 m	MPC · JPL
159876	2004 RN_{74}	—	September 8, 2004	Socorro	LINEAR	V	1.1 km	MPC · JPL
159877	2004 RY_{74}	—	September 8, 2004	Socorro	LINEAR	·	2.1 km	MPC · JPL
159878	2004 RG_{139}	—	September 8, 2004	Palomar	NEAT	slow	2.5 km	MPC · JPL
159879	2004 RO_{150}	—	September 9, 2004	Socorro	LINEAR	MAS	940 m	MPC · JPL
159880	2004 RE_{156}	—	September 10, 2004	Socorro	LINEAR	V	1.2 km	MPC · JPL
159881	2004 RL_{254}	—	September 6, 2004	Palomar	NEAT	V	1.1 km	MPC · JPL
159882	2004 RQ_{289}	—	September 14, 2004	Goodricke-Pigott	R. A. Tucker	·	1.3 km	MPC · JPL
159883	2004 RA_{310}	—	September 13, 2004	Socorro	LINEAR	·	3.3 km	MPC · JPL
159884	2004 RU_{310}	—	September 13, 2004	Palomar	NEAT	·	1.3 km	MPC · JPL
159885	2004 SK_{16}	—	September 17, 2004	Anderson Mesa	LONEOS	·	1.8 km	MPC · JPL
159886	2004 SP_{33}	—	September 17, 2004	Socorro	LINEAR	CYB	7.2 km	MPC · JPL
159887	2004 SF_{55}	—	September 22, 2004	Socorro	LINEAR	EUN	2.7 km	MPC · JPL
159888	2004 SL_{59}	—	September 22, 2004	Socorro	LINEAR	·	3.5 km	MPC · JPL
159889	2004 TR_{14}	—	October 10, 2004	Socorro	LINEAR	·	1.7 km	MPC · JPL
159890	2004 TP_{15}	—	October 9, 2004	Kitt Peak	Spacewatch	·	1.1 km	MPC · JPL
159891	2004 TD_{59}	—	October 5, 2004	Kitt Peak	Spacewatch	AST	4.2 km	MPC · JPL
159892	2004 TC_{66}	—	October 5, 2004	Anderson Mesa	LONEOS	·	1.7 km	MPC · JPL
159893	2004 TB_{77}	—	October 7, 2004	Socorro	LINEAR	·	1.5 km	MPC · JPL
159894	2004 TO_{77}	—	October 7, 2004	Kitt Peak	Spacewatch	·	3.1 km	MPC · JPL
159895	2004 TA_{101}	—	October 6, 2004	Kitt Peak	Spacewatch	·	1.4 km	MPC · JPL
159896	2004 TG_{119}	—	October 6, 2004	Socorro	LINEAR	·	1.7 km	MPC · JPL
159897	2004 TS_{130}	—	October 7, 2004	Socorro	LINEAR	·	1.4 km	MPC · JPL
159898	2004 TO_{216}	—	October 12, 2004	Kitt Peak	Spacewatch	·	1.1 km	MPC · JPL
159899	2004 TB_{282}	—	October 12, 2004	Kvistaberg	Uppsala-DLR Asteroid Survey	·	4.1 km	MPC · JPL
159900	2004 TF_{283}	—	October 7, 2004	Palomar	NEAT	·	3.6 km	MPC · JPL

== 159901–160000 ==
back to top

Designation			Discovery			Properties		Ref
Permanent	Provisional	Named after	Date	Site	Discoverer(s)	Category	Diam.	Ref
159901	2004 TD_{345}	—	October 15, 2004	Mount Lemmon	Mount Lemmon Survey	·	2.3 km	MPC · JPL
159902 Gladstone	2004 TY_{354}	Gladstone	October 11, 2004	Kitt Peak	M. W. Buie	·	1.6 km	MPC · JPL
159903	2004 VS_{6}	—	November 3, 2004	Kitt Peak	Spacewatch	·	3.2 km	MPC · JPL
159904	2004 VC_{9}	—	November 3, 2004	Anderson Mesa	LONEOS	·	5.0 km	MPC · JPL
159905	2004 VK_{13}	—	November 3, 2004	Palomar	NEAT	·	1.7 km	MPC · JPL
159906	2004 VH_{15}	—	November 5, 2004	Needville	J. Dellinger, Lowe, A.	·	3.0 km	MPC · JPL
159907	2004 VR_{16}	—	November 3, 2004	Anderson Mesa	LONEOS	RAF	1.8 km	MPC · JPL
159908	2004 VO_{21}	—	November 4, 2004	Catalina	CSS	·	4.2 km	MPC · JPL
159909	2004 VF_{23}	—	November 5, 2004	Campo Imperatore	CINEOS	·	5.0 km	MPC · JPL
159910	2004 VZ_{37}	—	November 4, 2004	Kitt Peak	Spacewatch	THM	3.6 km	MPC · JPL
159911	2004 VN_{39}	—	November 4, 2004	Kitt Peak	Spacewatch	EOS	2.7 km	MPC · JPL
159912	2004 VL_{50}	—	November 4, 2004	Kitt Peak	Spacewatch	·	3.5 km	MPC · JPL
159913	2004 VY_{64}	—	November 10, 2004	Kitt Peak	Spacewatch	EOS	3.6 km	MPC · JPL
159914	2004 VH_{70}	—	November 4, 2004	Anderson Mesa	LONEOS	·	2.7 km	MPC · JPL
159915	2004 VA_{92}	—	November 4, 2004	Kitt Peak	Spacewatch	·	3.5 km	MPC · JPL
159916	2004 WX_{2}	—	November 17, 2004	Siding Spring	SSS	·	1.9 km	MPC · JPL
159917	2004 XA_{87}	—	December 9, 2004	Socorro	LINEAR	·	2.0 km	MPC · JPL
159918	2004 XD_{144}	—	December 12, 2004	Socorro	LINEAR	·	2.5 km	MPC · JPL
159919	2004 XU_{163}	—	December 15, 2004	Socorro	LINEAR	AEG	6.6 km	MPC · JPL
159920	2004 XM_{172}	—	December 10, 2004	Socorro	LINEAR	·	3.0 km	MPC · JPL
159921	2004 XE_{185}	—	December 11, 2004	Kitt Peak	Spacewatch	·	3.3 km	MPC · JPL
159922	2004 YS_{26}	—	December 19, 2004	Mount Lemmon	Mount Lemmon Survey	·	4.5 km	MPC · JPL
159923	2004 YJ_{32}	—	December 19, 2004	Mount Lemmon	Mount Lemmon Survey	AMO +1km	1.8 km	MPC · JPL
159924	2004 YF_{36}	—	December 16, 2004	Kitt Peak	Spacewatch	·	2.8 km	MPC · JPL
159925	2005 AJ_{32}	—	January 11, 2005	Socorro	LINEAR	·	3.6 km	MPC · JPL
159926	2005 AT_{65}	—	January 13, 2005	Kitt Peak	Spacewatch	·	3.5 km	MPC · JPL
159927	2005 CL_{57}	—	February 2, 2005	Socorro	LINEAR	·	3.4 km	MPC · JPL
159928	2005 CV_{69}	—	February 3, 2005	Palomar	NEAT	APO +1km	890 m	MPC · JPL
159929	2005 UK	—	October 22, 2005	Kitt Peak	Spacewatch	AMO +1km	2.6 km	MPC · JPL
159930	2005 UM_{41}	—	October 25, 2005	Mount Lemmon	Mount Lemmon Survey	H	860 m	MPC · JPL
159931	2005 VY_{5}	—	November 11, 2005	Socorro	LINEAR	H	930 m	MPC · JPL
159932	2005 VD_{27}	—	November 3, 2005	Socorro	LINEAR	·	1.6 km	MPC · JPL
159933	2005 VE_{103}	—	November 2, 2005	Socorro	LINEAR	·	2.1 km	MPC · JPL
159934	2005 WZ_{6}	—	November 21, 2005	Catalina	CSS	·	2.8 km	MPC · JPL
159935	2005 WY_{59}	—	November 26, 2005	Catalina	CSS	·	6.4 km	MPC · JPL
159936	2005 WH_{71}	—	November 21, 2005	Kitt Peak	Spacewatch	PHO	2.0 km	MPC · JPL
159937	2005 WK_{97}	—	November 26, 2005	Mount Lemmon	Mount Lemmon Survey	3:2 · SHU	6.9 km	MPC · JPL
159938	2005 WP_{100}	—	November 29, 2005	Socorro	LINEAR	MAS	1.2 km	MPC · JPL
159939	2005 WT_{104}	—	November 28, 2005	Catalina	CSS	·	1.3 km	MPC · JPL
159940	2005 WD_{116}	—	November 30, 2005	Socorro	LINEAR	·	1.4 km	MPC · JPL
159941	2005 WV_{178}	—	November 25, 2005	Catalina	CSS	·	970 m	MPC · JPL
159942	2005 WK_{185}	—	November 29, 2005	Palomar	NEAT	·	3.6 km	MPC · JPL
159943	2005 XR_{13}	—	December 1, 2005	Kitt Peak	Spacewatch	·	1.7 km	MPC · JPL
159944	2005 XY_{16}	—	December 1, 2005	Kitt Peak	Spacewatch	·	1.4 km	MPC · JPL
159945	2005 XQ_{55}	—	December 5, 2005	Mount Lemmon	Mount Lemmon Survey	·	1.4 km	MPC · JPL
159946	2005 YT_{48}	—	December 22, 2005	Kitt Peak	Spacewatch	·	2.1 km	MPC · JPL
159947	2005 YE_{56}	—	December 21, 2005	Catalina	CSS	H	1.1 km	MPC · JPL
159948	2005 YU_{66}	—	December 25, 2005	Kitt Peak	Spacewatch	·	2.7 km	MPC · JPL
159949	2005 YO_{82}	—	December 24, 2005	Kitt Peak	Spacewatch	·	1.8 km	MPC · JPL
159950	2005 YM_{89}	—	December 26, 2005	Mount Lemmon	Mount Lemmon Survey	·	3.9 km	MPC · JPL
159951	2005 YB_{93}	—	December 27, 2005	Kitt Peak	Spacewatch	·	3.1 km	MPC · JPL
159952	2005 YK_{109}	—	December 25, 2005	Kitt Peak	Spacewatch	·	3.8 km	MPC · JPL
159953	2005 YW_{120}	—	December 27, 2005	Mount Lemmon	Mount Lemmon Survey	·	2.4 km	MPC · JPL
159954	2005 YM_{131}	—	December 25, 2005	Mount Lemmon	Mount Lemmon Survey	·	1.7 km	MPC · JPL
159955	2005 YO_{160}	—	December 27, 2005	Socorro	LINEAR	·	1.8 km	MPC · JPL
159956	2005 YL_{186}	—	December 29, 2005	Catalina	CSS	EOS	4.6 km	MPC · JPL
159957	2005 YC_{200}	—	December 26, 2005	Mount Lemmon	Mount Lemmon Survey	·	1.6 km	MPC · JPL
159958	2005 YE_{269}	—	December 25, 2005	Mount Lemmon	Mount Lemmon Survey	·	1.9 km	MPC · JPL
159959	2006 AZ_{10}	—	January 4, 2006	Catalina	CSS	·	4.5 km	MPC · JPL
159960	2006 AD_{14}	—	January 5, 2006	Mount Lemmon	Mount Lemmon Survey	MAR	2.0 km	MPC · JPL
159961	2006 AL_{74}	—	January 5, 2006	Anderson Mesa	LONEOS	·	3.0 km	MPC · JPL
159962	2006 AL_{93}	—	January 7, 2006	Mount Lemmon	Mount Lemmon Survey	EOS	3.6 km	MPC · JPL
159963	2006 AR_{93}	—	January 7, 2006	Mount Lemmon	Mount Lemmon Survey	·	1.9 km	MPC · JPL
159964	2006 BD_{11}	—	January 20, 2006	Kitt Peak	Spacewatch	ADE	3.8 km	MPC · JPL
159965	2006 BT_{12}	—	January 21, 2006	Mount Lemmon	Mount Lemmon Survey	·	3.8 km	MPC · JPL
159966	2006 BJ_{26}	—	January 22, 2006	Anderson Mesa	LONEOS	·	4.5 km	MPC · JPL
159967	2006 BZ_{32}	—	January 21, 2006	Kitt Peak	Spacewatch	KOR	2.3 km	MPC · JPL
159968	2006 BQ_{44}	—	January 23, 2006	Mount Lemmon	Mount Lemmon Survey	·	3.2 km	MPC · JPL
159969	2006 BJ_{62}	—	January 22, 2006	Catalina	CSS	URS	6.0 km	MPC · JPL
159970	2006 BJ_{63}	—	January 22, 2006	Mount Lemmon	Mount Lemmon Survey	·	2.4 km	MPC · JPL
159971	2006 BE_{83}	—	January 24, 2006	Socorro	LINEAR	·	2.6 km	MPC · JPL
159972	2006 BS_{92}	—	January 26, 2006	Mount Lemmon	Mount Lemmon Survey	·	4.3 km	MPC · JPL
159973	2006 BN_{95}	—	January 26, 2006	Kitt Peak	Spacewatch	KOR	2.2 km	MPC · JPL
159974 Badacsony	2006 BD_{141}	Badacsony	January 24, 2006	Piszkéstető	K. Sárneczky	NYS	1.3 km	MPC · JPL
159975	2006 BP_{148}	—	January 22, 2006	Catalina	CSS	·	4.2 km	MPC · JPL
159976	2006 BC_{154}	—	January 25, 2006	Kitt Peak	Spacewatch	·	2.6 km	MPC · JPL
159977	2006 BK_{164}	—	January 26, 2006	Mount Lemmon	Mount Lemmon Survey	·	2.7 km	MPC · JPL
159978	2006 BY_{164}	—	January 26, 2006	Kitt Peak	Spacewatch	·	2.5 km	MPC · JPL
159979	2006 BY_{174}	—	January 27, 2006	Kitt Peak	Spacewatch	·	1.9 km	MPC · JPL
159980	2006 BP_{179}	—	January 27, 2006	Mount Lemmon	Mount Lemmon Survey	·	1.1 km	MPC · JPL
159981	2006 BZ_{202}	—	January 31, 2006	Kitt Peak	Spacewatch	·	2.6 km	MPC · JPL
159982	2006 BW_{207}	—	January 31, 2006	Catalina	CSS	·	3.2 km	MPC · JPL
159983	2006 BE_{241}	—	January 31, 2006	Kitt Peak	Spacewatch	NYS	1.9 km	MPC · JPL
159984	2006 CR_{4}	—	February 1, 2006	Kitt Peak	Spacewatch	·	4.1 km	MPC · JPL
159985	2006 CA_{32}	—	February 2, 2006	Kitt Peak	Spacewatch	WIT	1.6 km	MPC · JPL
159986	2006 CW_{51}	—	February 4, 2006	Kitt Peak	Spacewatch	·	3.4 km	MPC · JPL
159987	2006 CT_{56}	—	February 4, 2006	Mount Lemmon	Mount Lemmon Survey	·	1.3 km	MPC · JPL
159988	2006 DJ_{5}	—	February 20, 2006	Catalina	CSS	·	5.0 km	MPC · JPL
159989	2006 DT_{36}	—	February 20, 2006	Kitt Peak	Spacewatch	V	1.2 km	MPC · JPL
159990	2006 DY_{38}	—	February 21, 2006	Catalina	CSS	CYB	6.4 km	MPC · JPL
159991	2006 DP_{50}	—	February 22, 2006	Catalina	CSS	·	2.9 km	MPC · JPL
159992	2006 DB_{114}	—	February 27, 2006	Catalina	CSS	·	6.2 km	MPC · JPL
159993	2006 DX_{114}	—	February 27, 2006	Kitt Peak	Spacewatch	THM	3.3 km	MPC · JPL
159994	2006 DJ_{140}	—	February 25, 2006	Kitt Peak	Spacewatch	·	3.4 km	MPC · JPL
159995	2006 DD_{172}	—	February 27, 2006	Kitt Peak	Spacewatch	·	5.5 km	MPC · JPL
159996	2006 DN_{204}	—	February 25, 2006	Anderson Mesa	LONEOS	·	8.7 km	MPC · JPL
159997	2006 DU_{211}	—	February 24, 2006	Kitt Peak	Spacewatch	·	2.5 km	MPC · JPL
159998	2006 EA_{18}	—	March 2, 2006	Mount Lemmon	Mount Lemmon Survey	·	2.0 km	MPC · JPL
159999 Michaelgriffin	2006 EZ_{67}	Michaelgriffin	March 2, 2006	Kitt Peak	M. W. Buie	·	2.2 km	MPC · JPL
160000 Lemmon	2006 GN_{18}	Lemmon	April 2, 2006	Mount Lemmon	Mount Lemmon Survey	EMA	4.9 km	MPC · JPL

back to top

== See also ==
- Meanings of minor-planet names: 159001–160000
