= Meanings of minor-planet names: 290001–291000 =

As minor planet discoveries are confirmed, they are given a permanent number by the IAU's Minor Planet Center (MPC), and the discoverers can then submit names for them, following the IAU's naming conventions. The list below concerns those minor planets in the specified number-range that have received names, and explains the meanings of those names.

Official naming citations of newly named small Solar System bodies are approved and published in a bulletin by IAU's Working Group for Small Bodies Nomenclature (WGSBN). Before May 2021, citations were published in MPC's Minor Planet Circulars for many decades. Recent citations can also be found on the JPL Small-Body Database (SBDB). Until his death in 2016, German astronomer Lutz D. Schmadel compiled these citations into the Dictionary of Minor Planet Names (DMP) and regularly updated the collection.

Based on Paul Herget's The Names of the Minor Planets, Schmadel also researched the unclear origin of numerous asteroids, most of which had been named prior to World War II. This article incorporates text from this source, which is in the public domain: SBDB New namings may only be added to this list below after official publication as the preannouncement of names is condemned. The WGSBN publishes a comprehensive guideline for the naming rules of non-cometary small Solar System bodies.

== 290001–290100 ==
Named minor planet	Provisional	This minor planet was named for...	Ref · Catalog
290001 Uebersax	2005 PP_{16}	Robert Uebersax (born 1963), a Swiss amateur astronomer and member of the Jura Astronomy Society (French: Société Jurassienne d'Astronomie)	JPL · 290001
290074 Donasadock	2005 QF_{76}	Dona Sadock (born 1945), producer of the Firesign Theater and radio programs, and a friend of French discoverer Bernard Christophe	JPL · 290074

== 290101–290200 ==
back to top

Named minor planet	Provisional	This minor planet was named for...	Ref · Catalog
290127 Linakostenko	2005 QC_{149}	Lina Kostenko (born 1930), an awarded Ukrainian poet and writer of the Sixtiers cultural movement	JPL · 290127
290129 Rátzlászló	2005 QC_{152}	László Rátz (1863–1930) was a Hungarian mathematics teacher best known for educating John von Neumann and Nobel laureate Eugene Wigner. He was a teacher of the Budapest Lutheran Gymnasium. Between 1894 and 1914 he was editor-in-chief of the Mathematical and Physical Journal for Secondary Schools.	JPL · 290129
290156 Houde	2005 QL_{183}	Martin Houde (b. 1963), a Canadian astronomer.	IAU · 290156
290180 Pattiekletter	2005 RK_{48}	Description available (see ref). Please summarize in your own words.	IAU · 290180
290180 Pattiekletter	2005 RK_{48}	Patricia Kletter (1950–2024), an American talented artist and a generous teacher.	IAU · 290180
290181 Sigut	2005 RZ_{50}	Thomas Allan Aaron Sigut (b. 1966), a Canadian astronomer.	IAU · 290181

== 290201–290300 ==
back to top

Named minor planet	Provisional	This minor planet was named for...	Ref · Catalog
There are no named minor planets in this number range

== 290301–290400 ==
back to top

Named minor planet	Provisional	This minor planet was named for...	Ref · Catalog
There are no named minor planets in this number range

== 290401–290500 ==
back to top

Named minor planet	Provisional	This minor planet was named for...	Ref · Catalog
There are no named minor planets in this number range

== 290501–290600 ==
back to top

Named minor planet	Provisional	This minor planet was named for...	Ref · Catalog
There are no named minor planets in this number range

== 290601–290700 ==
back to top

Named minor planet	Provisional	This minor planet was named for...	Ref · Catalog
There are no named minor planets in this number range

== 290701–290800 ==
back to top

Named minor planet	Provisional	This minor planet was named for...	Ref · Catalog
There are no named minor planets in this number range

== 290801–290900 ==
back to top

Named minor planet	Provisional	This minor planet was named for...	Ref · Catalog
There are no named minor planets in this number range

== 290901–291000 ==
back to top

Named minor planet	Provisional	This minor planet was named for...	Ref · Catalog
There are no named minor planets in this number range

back to top

Preceded by 289,001–290,000	Meanings of minor-planet names List of minor planets: 290,001–291,000	Succeeded by 291,001–292,000
