= List of minor planets: 290001–291000 =

The following is a partial list of minor planets, running from minor-planet number 290001 through 291000, inclusive. The primary data for this and other partial lists is based on JPL's "Small-Body Orbital Elements" and data available from the Minor Planet Center. Critical list information is also provided by the MPC, unless otherwise specified from Lowell Observatory. A detailed description of the table's columns and additional sources are given on the main page including a complete list of every page in this series, and a statistical break-up on the dynamical classification of minor planets.

Also see the summary list of all named bodies in numerical and alphabetical order, and the corresponding naming citations for the number range of this particular list. New namings may only be added to this list after official publication, as the preannouncement of names is condemned by the Working Group for Small Bodies Nomenclature of the International Astronomical Union.

Near-Earth obj.	MBA (inner)	MBA (outer)	Centaur
Mars-crosser	MBA (middle)	Jupiter trojan	Trans-Neptunian obj.
Unclassified

== 290001–290100 ==
Designation			Discovery			Properties		Ref
Permanent	Provisional	Named after	Date	Site	Discoverer(s)	Category	Diam.	Ref
290001 Uebersax	2005 PP_{16}	Uebersax	August 10, 2005	Vicques	M. Ory	AEG	3.1 km	MPC · JPL
290002	2005 PC_{17}	—	August 12, 2005	Wrightwood	J. W. Young	HNS	1.7 km	MPC · JPL
290003	2005 PY_{18}	—	August 12, 2005	Needville	J. Dellinger	·	2.7 km	MPC · JPL
290004	2005 PA_{21}	—	August 6, 2005	Palomar	NEAT	·	2.3 km	MPC · JPL
290005	2005 PG_{24}	—	August 10, 2005	Cerro Tololo	M. W. Buie	MRX	1.0 km	MPC · JPL
290006	2005 PL_{24}	—	August 6, 2005	Palomar	NEAT	CYB	3.4 km	MPC · JPL
290007	2005 QC_{1}	—	August 22, 2005	Palomar	NEAT	·	1.7 km	MPC · JPL
290008	2005 QS_{1}	—	August 22, 2005	Palomar	NEAT	·	1.3 km	MPC · JPL
290009	2005 QV_{1}	—	August 22, 2005	Palomar	NEAT	·	1.5 km	MPC · JPL
290010	2005 QA_{8}	—	August 24, 2005	Palomar	NEAT	·	1.0 km	MPC · JPL
290011	2005 QO_{8}	—	August 25, 2005	Palomar	NEAT	·	4.6 km	MPC · JPL
290012	2005 QE_{9}	—	August 25, 2005	Palomar	NEAT	·	2.0 km	MPC · JPL
290013	2005 QE_{11}	—	August 27, 2005	Junk Bond	D. Healy	·	1.6 km	MPC · JPL
290014	2005 QC_{14}	—	August 24, 2005	Palomar	NEAT	·	2.5 km	MPC · JPL
290015	2005 QN_{14}	—	August 25, 2005	Palomar	NEAT	(5)	1.2 km	MPC · JPL
290016	2005 QX_{14}	—	August 25, 2005	Palomar	NEAT	EOS	3.1 km	MPC · JPL
290017	2005 QQ_{15}	—	August 25, 2005	Palomar	NEAT	CYB	4.9 km	MPC · JPL
290018	2005 QR_{15}	—	August 25, 2005	Palomar	NEAT	NEM	2.7 km	MPC · JPL
290019	2005 QR_{16}	—	August 25, 2005	Palomar	NEAT	EUP	5.7 km	MPC · JPL
290020	2005 QT_{18}	—	August 25, 2005	Palomar	NEAT	·	3.5 km	MPC · JPL
290021	2005 QY_{19}	—	August 26, 2005	Campo Imperatore	CINEOS	·	1.9 km	MPC · JPL
290022	2005 QG_{20}	—	August 26, 2005	Anderson Mesa	LONEOS	·	6.2 km	MPC · JPL
290023	2005 QL_{20}	—	August 26, 2005	Anderson Mesa	LONEOS	·	2.8 km	MPC · JPL
290024	2005 QE_{22}	—	August 27, 2005	Kitt Peak	Spacewatch	·	1.7 km	MPC · JPL
290025	2005 QC_{24}	—	August 27, 2005	Kitt Peak	Spacewatch	·	4.1 km	MPC · JPL
290026	2005 QE_{24}	—	August 27, 2005	Kitt Peak	Spacewatch	EOS	2.8 km	MPC · JPL
290027	2005 QY_{24}	—	August 27, 2005	Kitt Peak	Spacewatch	·	1.5 km	MPC · JPL
290028	2005 QO_{25}	—	August 27, 2005	Kitt Peak	Spacewatch	·	2.3 km	MPC · JPL
290029	2005 QE_{26}	—	August 27, 2005	Kitt Peak	Spacewatch	HYG	3.8 km	MPC · JPL
290030	2005 QP_{28}	—	August 28, 2005	Vicques	M. Ory	·	2.3 km	MPC · JPL
290031	2005 QE_{29}	—	August 23, 2005	Haleakala	NEAT	·	920 m	MPC · JPL
290032	2005 QW_{30}	—	August 24, 2005	Palomar	NEAT	·	1.9 km	MPC · JPL
290033	2005 QJ_{31}	—	August 22, 2005	Palomar	NEAT	NYS	1.3 km	MPC · JPL
290034	2005 QW_{31}	—	August 24, 2005	Palomar	NEAT	·	2.1 km	MPC · JPL
290035	2005 QF_{32}	—	August 24, 2005	Palomar	NEAT	MAS	800 m	MPC · JPL
290036	2005 QK_{32}	—	August 24, 2005	Palomar	NEAT	·	2.8 km	MPC · JPL
290037	2005 QU_{32}	—	August 25, 2005	Palomar	NEAT	·	1.5 km	MPC · JPL
290038	2005 QP_{33}	—	August 25, 2005	Palomar	NEAT	·	3.2 km	MPC · JPL
290039	2005 QW_{34}	—	August 25, 2005	Palomar	NEAT	·	3.7 km	MPC · JPL
290040	2005 QT_{35}	—	August 25, 2005	Palomar	NEAT	NYS	1.7 km	MPC · JPL
290041	2005 QR_{38}	—	August 25, 2005	Campo Imperatore	CINEOS	·	960 m	MPC · JPL
290042	2005 QU_{38}	—	August 25, 2005	Campo Imperatore	CINEOS	·	700 m	MPC · JPL
290043	2005 QQ_{42}	—	August 26, 2005	Anderson Mesa	LONEOS	(5)	1.4 km	MPC · JPL
290044	2005 QG_{44}	—	August 26, 2005	Palomar	NEAT	MAS	840 m	MPC · JPL
290045	2005 QH_{44}	—	August 26, 2005	Palomar	NEAT	EOS	2.6 km	MPC · JPL
290046	2005 QX_{45}	—	August 26, 2005	Palomar	NEAT	PHO	1.3 km	MPC · JPL
290047	2005 QW_{46}	—	August 26, 2005	Palomar	NEAT	·	1.9 km	MPC · JPL
290048	2005 QD_{47}	—	August 26, 2005	Palomar	NEAT	EOS	2.5 km	MPC · JPL
290049	2005 QL_{47}	—	August 26, 2005	Palomar	NEAT	CYB	3.9 km	MPC · JPL
290050	2005 QC_{48}	—	August 26, 2005	Palomar	NEAT	EOS ·	2.6 km	MPC · JPL
290051	2005 QE_{48}	—	August 26, 2005	Palomar	NEAT	MRX	1.4 km	MPC · JPL
290052	2005 QG_{49}	—	August 26, 2005	Anderson Mesa	LONEOS	·	4.4 km	MPC · JPL
290053	2005 QY_{53}	—	August 28, 2005	Kitt Peak	Spacewatch	615	2.1 km	MPC · JPL
290054	2005 QO_{54}	—	August 28, 2005	Kitt Peak	Spacewatch	·	2.0 km	MPC · JPL
290055	2005 QF_{57}	—	August 30, 2005	Vicques	M. Ory	NYS	1.1 km	MPC · JPL
290056	2005 QH_{57}	—	August 29, 2005	Drebach	Drebach	·	1.0 km	MPC · JPL
290057	2005 QO_{58}	—	August 25, 2005	Palomar	NEAT	·	3.0 km	MPC · JPL
290058	2005 QN_{59}	—	August 25, 2005	Palomar	NEAT	EUN	1.1 km	MPC · JPL
290059	2005 QS_{59}	—	August 25, 2005	Palomar	NEAT	·	2.2 km	MPC · JPL
290060	2005 QF_{62}	—	August 26, 2005	Palomar	NEAT	V	800 m	MPC · JPL
290061	2005 QX_{64}	—	August 26, 2005	Palomar	NEAT	·	1.7 km	MPC · JPL
290062	2005 QC_{65}	—	August 26, 2005	Palomar	NEAT	AGN	1.5 km	MPC · JPL
290063	2005 QU_{65}	—	August 27, 2005	Anderson Mesa	LONEOS	·	3.1 km	MPC · JPL
290064	2005 QH_{66}	—	August 27, 2005	Anderson Mesa	LONEOS	·	1.9 km	MPC · JPL
290065	2005 QE_{67}	—	August 28, 2005	Anderson Mesa	LONEOS	·	2.1 km	MPC · JPL
290066	2005 QB_{69}	—	August 28, 2005	Siding Spring	SSS	EUP	6.0 km	MPC · JPL
290067	2005 QS_{69}	—	August 29, 2005	Anderson Mesa	LONEOS	·	1.3 km	MPC · JPL
290068	2005 QB_{70}	—	August 29, 2005	Socorro	LINEAR	·	830 m	MPC · JPL
290069	2005 QM_{70}	—	August 29, 2005	Socorro	LINEAR	·	1.1 km	MPC · JPL
290070	2005 QG_{71}	—	August 29, 2005	Socorro	LINEAR	·	900 m	MPC · JPL
290071	2005 QW_{71}	—	August 29, 2005	Anderson Mesa	LONEOS	·	4.3 km	MPC · JPL
290072	2005 QH_{73}	—	August 29, 2005	Anderson Mesa	LONEOS	H	700 m	MPC · JPL
290073	2005 QN_{73}	—	August 29, 2005	Anderson Mesa	LONEOS	·	980 m	MPC · JPL
290074 Donasadock	2005 QF_{76}	Donasadock	August 29, 2005	Saint-Sulpice	B. Christophe	·	1.4 km	MPC · JPL
290075	2005 QR_{78}	—	August 25, 2005	Palomar	NEAT	NYS	1.1 km	MPC · JPL
290076	2005 QA_{81}	—	August 29, 2005	Kitt Peak	Spacewatch	EOS	2.1 km	MPC · JPL
290077	2005 QA_{85}	—	August 30, 2005	Kitt Peak	Spacewatch	EOS	2.6 km	MPC · JPL
290078	2005 QH_{85}	—	August 30, 2005	Socorro	LINEAR	·	5.6 km	MPC · JPL
290079	2005 QD_{88}	—	August 31, 2005	Calvin-Rehoboth	L. A. Molnar	·	810 m	MPC · JPL
290080	2005 QA_{89}	—	August 30, 2005	Socorro	LINEAR	·	3.1 km	MPC · JPL
290081	2005 QM_{89}	—	August 22, 2005	Palomar	NEAT	·	770 m	MPC · JPL
290082	2005 QQ_{89}	—	August 22, 2005	Palomar	NEAT	THM	2.8 km	MPC · JPL
290083	2005 QX_{92}	—	August 26, 2005	Palomar	NEAT	·	2.1 km	MPC · JPL
290084	2005 QV_{93}	—	August 26, 2005	Palomar	NEAT	·	1.6 km	MPC · JPL
290085	2005 QH_{94}	—	August 27, 2005	Palomar	NEAT	·	1.7 km	MPC · JPL
290086	2005 QL_{95}	—	August 27, 2005	Palomar	NEAT	·	4.4 km	MPC · JPL
290087	2005 QR_{96}	—	August 27, 2005	Palomar	NEAT	·	830 m	MPC · JPL
290088	2005 QL_{98}	—	August 27, 2005	Palomar	NEAT	·	1.2 km	MPC · JPL
290089	2005 QJ_{100}	—	August 27, 2005	Palomar	NEAT	·	2.2 km	MPC · JPL
290090	2005 QS_{100}	—	August 27, 2005	Palomar	NEAT	·	2.3 km	MPC · JPL
290091	2005 QO_{102}	—	August 31, 2005	Kitt Peak	Spacewatch	·	1.8 km	MPC · JPL
290092	2005 QN_{103}	—	August 27, 2005	Palomar	NEAT	·	2.2 km	MPC · JPL
290093	2005 QX_{103}	—	August 27, 2005	Palomar	NEAT	·	1.2 km	MPC · JPL
290094	2005 QJ_{104}	—	August 29, 2005	Kitt Peak	Spacewatch	·	1.7 km	MPC · JPL
290095	2005 QN_{106}	—	August 27, 2005	Palomar	NEAT	·	2.9 km	MPC · JPL
290096	2005 QX_{108}	—	August 27, 2005	Palomar	NEAT	·	3.1 km	MPC · JPL
290097	2005 QL_{111}	—	August 27, 2005	Palomar	NEAT	·	2.2 km	MPC · JPL
290098	2005 QC_{112}	—	August 27, 2005	Palomar	NEAT	NEM	2.4 km	MPC · JPL
290099	2005 QC_{113}	—	August 27, 2005	Palomar	NEAT	·	2.4 km	MPC · JPL
290100	2005 QD_{113}	—	August 27, 2005	Palomar	NEAT	·	4.4 km	MPC · JPL

== 290101–290200 ==
back to top

Designation			Discovery			Properties		Ref
Permanent	Provisional	Named after	Date	Site	Discoverer(s)	Category	Diam.	Ref
290101	2005 QP_{113}	—	August 27, 2005	Palomar	NEAT	·	3.8 km	MPC · JPL
290102	2005 QS_{113}	—	August 27, 2005	Palomar	NEAT	·	3.6 km	MPC · JPL
290103	2005 QA_{114}	—	August 27, 2005	Palomar	NEAT	·	3.0 km	MPC · JPL
290104	2005 QR_{114}	—	August 27, 2005	Palomar	NEAT	·	1.8 km	MPC · JPL
290105	2005 QH_{116}	—	August 28, 2005	Kitt Peak	Spacewatch	EOS	2.5 km	MPC · JPL
290106	2005 QL_{116}	—	August 28, 2005	Kitt Peak	Spacewatch	·	1.7 km	MPC · JPL
290107	2005 QA_{117}	—	August 28, 2005	Kitt Peak	Spacewatch	·	880 m	MPC · JPL
290108	2005 QO_{117}	—	August 28, 2005	Kitt Peak	Spacewatch	AGN	1.3 km	MPC · JPL
290109	2005 QX_{117}	—	August 28, 2005	Kitt Peak	Spacewatch	·	2.8 km	MPC · JPL
290110	2005 QE_{118}	—	August 28, 2005	Kitt Peak	Spacewatch	·	1.8 km	MPC · JPL
290111	2005 QT_{118}	—	August 28, 2005	Kitt Peak	Spacewatch	·	1.3 km	MPC · JPL
290112	2005 QB_{120}	—	August 28, 2005	Kitt Peak	Spacewatch	·	2.1 km	MPC · JPL
290113	2005 QB_{123}	—	August 28, 2005	Kitt Peak	Spacewatch	KOR	1.8 km	MPC · JPL
290114	2005 QZ_{123}	—	August 28, 2005	Kitt Peak	Spacewatch	·	2.1 km	MPC · JPL
290115	2005 QV_{124}	—	August 28, 2005	Kitt Peak	Spacewatch	·	2.3 km	MPC · JPL
290116	2005 QM_{126}	—	August 28, 2005	Kitt Peak	Spacewatch	·	4.6 km	MPC · JPL
290117	2005 QL_{128}	—	August 28, 2005	Kitt Peak	Spacewatch	KOR	1.9 km	MPC · JPL
290118	2005 QP_{128}	—	August 28, 2005	Kitt Peak	Spacewatch	KOR	1.7 km	MPC · JPL
290119	2005 QV_{132}	—	August 28, 2005	Kitt Peak	Spacewatch	AGN	1.2 km	MPC · JPL
290120	2005 QB_{134}	—	August 28, 2005	Kitt Peak	Spacewatch	·	1.7 km	MPC · JPL
290121	2005 QU_{134}	—	August 28, 2005	Kitt Peak	Spacewatch	·	1.8 km	MPC · JPL
290122	2005 QL_{135}	—	August 28, 2005	Kitt Peak	Spacewatch	·	1.4 km	MPC · JPL
290123	2005 QF_{137}	—	August 28, 2005	Kitt Peak	Spacewatch	·	2.4 km	MPC · JPL
290124	2005 QC_{142}	—	August 30, 2005	Socorro	LINEAR	·	1.1 km	MPC · JPL
290125	2005 QO_{148}	—	August 30, 2005	Anderson Mesa	LONEOS	·	2.9 km	MPC · JPL
290126	2005 QP_{148}	—	August 30, 2005	Anderson Mesa	LONEOS	·	950 m	MPC · JPL
290127 Linakostenko	2005 QC_{149}	Linakostenko	August 29, 2005	Andrushivka	Andrushivka	EUP	7.7 km	MPC · JPL
290128	2005 QD_{150}	—	August 27, 2005	Kitt Peak	Spacewatch	·	930 m	MPC · JPL
290129 Rátzlászló	2005 QC_{152}	Rátzlászló	August 31, 2005	Piszkéstető	K. Sárneczky, Kuli, Z.	·	2.5 km	MPC · JPL
290130	2005 QC_{153}	—	August 27, 2005	Campo Imperatore	CINEOS	·	890 m	MPC · JPL
290131	2005 QH_{153}	—	August 27, 2005	Palomar	NEAT	·	1.4 km	MPC · JPL
290132	2005 QJ_{153}	—	August 27, 2005	Palomar	NEAT	·	920 m	MPC · JPL
290133	2005 QS_{153}	—	August 27, 2005	Palomar	NEAT	·	1.6 km	MPC · JPL
290134	2005 QB_{154}	—	August 27, 2005	Palomar	NEAT	·	2.3 km	MPC · JPL
290135	2005 QH_{154}	—	August 27, 2005	Palomar	NEAT	·	6.4 km	MPC · JPL
290136	2005 QK_{154}	—	August 27, 2005	Palomar	NEAT	·	3.6 km	MPC · JPL
290137	2005 QH_{155}	—	August 28, 2005	Siding Spring	SSS	V	760 m	MPC · JPL
290138	2005 QQ_{155}	—	August 30, 2005	Palomar	NEAT	NYS	1.0 km	MPC · JPL
290139	2005 QR_{156}	—	August 30, 2005	Palomar	NEAT	·	5.3 km	MPC · JPL
290140	2005 QZ_{159}	—	August 28, 2005	Anderson Mesa	LONEOS	H	830 m	MPC · JPL
290141	2005 QM_{161}	—	August 28, 2005	Siding Spring	SSS	·	4.2 km	MPC · JPL
290142	2005 QH_{162}	—	August 30, 2005	Palomar	NEAT	·	1.8 km	MPC · JPL
290143	2005 QS_{166}	—	August 26, 2005	Palomar	NEAT	·	2.2 km	MPC · JPL
290144	2005 QT_{168}	—	August 29, 2005	Palomar	NEAT	·	2.9 km	MPC · JPL
290145	2005 QY_{174}	—	August 31, 2005	Socorro	LINEAR	·	1.5 km	MPC · JPL
290146	2005 QC_{175}	—	August 31, 2005	Kitt Peak	Spacewatch	·	4.4 km	MPC · JPL
290147	2005 QE_{175}	—	August 31, 2005	Kitt Peak	Spacewatch	·	970 m	MPC · JPL
290148	2005 QT_{177}	—	August 31, 2005	Anderson Mesa	LONEOS	·	2.4 km	MPC · JPL
290149	2005 QX_{177}	—	August 31, 2005	Kitt Peak	Spacewatch	·	1.8 km	MPC · JPL
290150	2005 QQ_{178}	—	August 28, 2005	Kitt Peak	Spacewatch	·	1.2 km	MPC · JPL
290151	2005 QW_{178}	—	August 30, 2005	Palomar	NEAT	EOS	2.7 km	MPC · JPL
290152	2005 QJ_{179}	—	August 25, 2005	Palomar	NEAT	EOS	2.5 km	MPC · JPL
290153	2005 QY_{179}	—	August 26, 2005	Palomar	NEAT	·	2.7 km	MPC · JPL
290154	2005 QX_{182}	—	August 27, 2005	Palomar	NEAT	·	2.2 km	MPC · JPL
290155	2005 QZ_{182}	—	August 27, 2005	Palomar	NEAT	615	2.5 km	MPC · JPL
290156 Houde	2005 QL_{183}	Houde	August 27, 2005	Mauna Kea	P. A. Wiegert	·	1.0 km	MPC · JPL
290157	2005 QV_{187}	—	August 29, 2005	Anderson Mesa	LONEOS	·	4.7 km	MPC · JPL
290158	2005 QC_{188}	—	August 30, 2005	Kitt Peak	Spacewatch	KOR	1.6 km	MPC · JPL
290159	2005 QK_{190}	—	August 31, 2005	Kitt Peak	Spacewatch	·	1.5 km	MPC · JPL
290160	2005 RK_{1}	—	September 1, 2005	Palomar	NEAT	·	1.0 km	MPC · JPL
290161	2005 RE_{2}	—	September 2, 2005	Palomar	NEAT	·	2.9 km	MPC · JPL
290162	2005 RC_{5}	—	September 7, 2005	Uccle	T. Pauwels	·	1.8 km	MPC · JPL
290163	2005 RT_{11}	—	September 11, 2005	Junk Bond	D. Healy	CYB	5.6 km	MPC · JPL
290164	2005 RB_{12}	—	September 1, 2005	Kitt Peak	Spacewatch	·	1.3 km	MPC · JPL
290165	2005 RK_{18}	—	September 1, 2005	Kitt Peak	Spacewatch	LUT	8.2 km	MPC · JPL
290166	2005 RX_{18}	—	September 1, 2005	Kitt Peak	Spacewatch	AGN	1.2 km	MPC · JPL
290167	2005 RM_{20}	—	September 1, 2005	Palomar	NEAT	EOS	2.0 km	MPC · JPL
290168	2005 RL_{21}	—	September 6, 2005	Campo Catino	Campo Catino Austral Observatory Survey	EOS · fast	2.6 km	MPC · JPL
290169	2005 RO_{21}	—	September 6, 2005	Anderson Mesa	LONEOS	V	890 m	MPC · JPL
290170	2005 RR_{25}	—	September 11, 2005	Socorro	LINEAR	·	4.6 km	MPC · JPL
290171	2005 RY_{25}	—	September 8, 2005	Uccle	T. Pauwels	·	2.2 km	MPC · JPL
290172	2005 RB_{28}	—	September 11, 2005	Kitt Peak	Spacewatch	·	1.6 km	MPC · JPL
290173	2005 RJ_{29}	—	September 12, 2005	Goodricke-Pigott	R. A. Tucker	·	4.7 km	MPC · JPL
290174	2005 RB_{33}	—	September 13, 2005	Catalina	CSS	·	4.0 km	MPC · JPL
290175	2005 RM_{40}	—	September 8, 2005	Socorro	LINEAR	PHO	2.9 km	MPC · JPL
290176	2005 RB_{42}	—	September 14, 2005	Kitt Peak	Spacewatch	NYS	1.0 km	MPC · JPL
290177	2005 RT_{43}	—	September 1, 2005	Kitt Peak	Spacewatch	·	910 m	MPC · JPL
290178	2005 RF_{44}	—	September 3, 2005	Catalina	CSS	EUP	4.9 km	MPC · JPL
290179	2005 RT_{45}	—	September 14, 2005	Apache Point	A. C. Becker	·	1.0 km	MPC · JPL
290180 Pattiekletter	2005 RK_{48}	Pattiekletter	September 3, 2005	Catalina	CSS	·	2.5 km	MPC · JPL
290181 Sigut	2005 RZ_{50}	Sigut	September 3, 2005	Mauna Kea	P. A. Wiegert	·	3.2 km	MPC · JPL
290182	2005 RT_{51}	—	September 14, 2005	Kitt Peak	Spacewatch	EOS	2.0 km	MPC · JPL
290183	2005 SZ_{4}	—	September 25, 2005	Wrightwood	J. W. Young	·	2.1 km	MPC · JPL
290184	2005 SG_{5}	—	September 23, 2005	Catalina	CSS	MRX	1.2 km	MPC · JPL
290185	2005 SL_{6}	—	September 23, 2005	Kitt Peak	Spacewatch	AGN	1.6 km	MPC · JPL
290186	2005 SF_{7}	—	September 24, 2005	Kitt Peak	Spacewatch	·	1.6 km	MPC · JPL
290187	2005 SY_{10}	—	September 23, 2005	Kitt Peak	Spacewatch	fast	5.9 km	MPC · JPL
290188	2005 SG_{11}	—	September 23, 2005	Kitt Peak	Spacewatch	BRA	1.8 km	MPC · JPL
290189	2005 SC_{14}	—	September 24, 2005	Kitt Peak	Spacewatch	·	1.7 km	MPC · JPL
290190	2005 SJ_{15}	—	September 26, 2005	Kitt Peak	Spacewatch	AGN	1.2 km	MPC · JPL
290191	2005 SX_{15}	—	September 26, 2005	Kitt Peak	Spacewatch	·	3.1 km	MPC · JPL
290192	2005 SM_{22}	—	September 23, 2005	Kitt Peak	Spacewatch	·	1.7 km	MPC · JPL
290193	2005 SD_{23}	—	September 23, 2005	Catalina	CSS	MAS	770 m	MPC · JPL
290194	2005 SV_{24}	—	September 24, 2005	Anderson Mesa	LONEOS	·	3.9 km	MPC · JPL
290195	2005 SD_{27}	—	September 23, 2005	Kitt Peak	Spacewatch	·	2.0 km	MPC · JPL
290196	2005 SF_{27}	—	September 23, 2005	Kitt Peak	Spacewatch	·	2.3 km	MPC · JPL
290197	2005 SY_{27}	—	September 23, 2005	Kitt Peak	Spacewatch	·	1.1 km	MPC · JPL
290198	2005 SX_{28}	—	September 23, 2005	Kitt Peak	Spacewatch	·	2.2 km	MPC · JPL
290199	2005 SS_{29}	—	September 23, 2005	Kitt Peak	Spacewatch	·	4.2 km	MPC · JPL
290200	2005 SE_{32}	—	September 23, 2005	Kitt Peak	Spacewatch	·	2.4 km	MPC · JPL

== 290201–290300 ==
back to top

Designation			Discovery			Properties		Ref
Permanent	Provisional	Named after	Date	Site	Discoverer(s)	Category	Diam.	Ref
290201	2005 SK_{34}	—	September 23, 2005	Kitt Peak	Spacewatch	AGN	1.4 km	MPC · JPL
290202	2005 SD_{36}	—	September 24, 2005	Kitt Peak	Spacewatch	·	3.9 km	MPC · JPL
290203	2005 SM_{37}	—	September 24, 2005	Kitt Peak	Spacewatch	·	2.6 km	MPC · JPL
290204	2005 SN_{37}	—	September 24, 2005	Kitt Peak	Spacewatch	EOS	2.1 km	MPC · JPL
290205	2005 SC_{38}	—	September 24, 2005	Kitt Peak	Spacewatch	·	4.9 km	MPC · JPL
290206	2005 SW_{38}	—	September 24, 2005	Kitt Peak	Spacewatch	·	1.8 km	MPC · JPL
290207	2005 SM_{39}	—	September 24, 2005	Kitt Peak	Spacewatch	·	1.8 km	MPC · JPL
290208	2005 SN_{40}	—	September 24, 2005	Kitt Peak	Spacewatch	·	890 m	MPC · JPL
290209	2005 SA_{41}	—	September 24, 2005	Kitt Peak	Spacewatch	·	3.5 km	MPC · JPL
290210	2005 SH_{41}	—	September 24, 2005	Kitt Peak	Spacewatch	·	2.4 km	MPC · JPL
290211	2005 SF_{42}	—	September 24, 2005	Kitt Peak	Spacewatch	·	2.3 km	MPC · JPL
290212	2005 SB_{44}	—	September 24, 2005	Kitt Peak	Spacewatch	·	3.5 km	MPC · JPL
290213	2005 SG_{44}	—	September 24, 2005	Kitt Peak	Spacewatch	·	1.5 km	MPC · JPL
290214	2005 SH_{44}	—	September 24, 2005	Kitt Peak	Spacewatch	·	2.4 km	MPC · JPL
290215	2005 SV_{45}	—	September 24, 2005	Kitt Peak	Spacewatch	·	3.6 km	MPC · JPL
290216	2005 SY_{45}	—	September 24, 2005	Kitt Peak	Spacewatch	NYS	1.1 km	MPC · JPL
290217	2005 SO_{48}	—	September 24, 2005	Palomar	NEAT	·	5.4 km	MPC · JPL
290218	2005 SE_{49}	—	September 24, 2005	Kitt Peak	Spacewatch	·	3.2 km	MPC · JPL
290219	2005 SX_{50}	—	September 24, 2005	Kitt Peak	Spacewatch	·	2.3 km	MPC · JPL
290220	2005 SG_{51}	—	September 24, 2005	Kitt Peak	Spacewatch	·	1.5 km	MPC · JPL
290221	2005 SN_{53}	—	September 25, 2005	Kitt Peak	Spacewatch	·	1.5 km	MPC · JPL
290222	2005 SY_{53}	—	September 25, 2005	Kitt Peak	Spacewatch	·	1.8 km	MPC · JPL
290223	2005 SS_{54}	—	September 25, 2005	Kitt Peak	Spacewatch	EOS	1.7 km	MPC · JPL
290224	2005 SU_{56}	—	September 26, 2005	Kitt Peak	Spacewatch	MAS	780 m	MPC · JPL
290225	2005 ST_{58}	—	September 26, 2005	Kitt Peak	Spacewatch	·	1.4 km	MPC · JPL
290226	2005 SL_{59}	—	September 26, 2005	Kitt Peak	Spacewatch	KOR	1.3 km	MPC · JPL
290227	2005 SL_{62}	—	September 26, 2005	Kitt Peak	Spacewatch	·	1.7 km	MPC · JPL
290228	2005 SA_{63}	—	September 26, 2005	Palomar	NEAT	·	2.2 km	MPC · JPL
290229	2005 SP_{63}	—	September 26, 2005	Kitt Peak	Spacewatch	·	1.9 km	MPC · JPL
290230	2005 SB_{64}	—	September 26, 2005	Kitt Peak	Spacewatch	·	2.9 km	MPC · JPL
290231	2005 SR_{64}	—	September 26, 2005	Kitt Peak	Spacewatch	·	1.6 km	MPC · JPL
290232	2005 SL_{65}	—	September 26, 2005	Palomar	NEAT	·	1.8 km	MPC · JPL
290233	2005 SF_{71}	—	September 30, 2005	Socorro	LINEAR	H	800 m	MPC · JPL
290234	2005 SF_{73}	—	September 23, 2005	Kitt Peak	Spacewatch	·	2.4 km	MPC · JPL
290235	2005 SO_{74}	—	September 24, 2005	Kitt Peak	Spacewatch	KOR	1.4 km	MPC · JPL
290236	2005 SP_{74}	—	September 24, 2005	Kitt Peak	Spacewatch	NEM	2.3 km	MPC · JPL
290237	2005 SN_{81}	—	September 24, 2005	Kitt Peak	Spacewatch	·	1.7 km	MPC · JPL
290238	2005 SR_{81}	—	September 24, 2005	Kitt Peak	Spacewatch	·	2.6 km	MPC · JPL
290239	2005 SS_{81}	—	September 24, 2005	Kitt Peak	Spacewatch	·	2.5 km	MPC · JPL
290240	2005 SC_{86}	—	September 24, 2005	Kitt Peak	Spacewatch	·	2.2 km	MPC · JPL
290241	2005 SY_{90}	—	September 24, 2005	Kitt Peak	Spacewatch	·	3.4 km	MPC · JPL
290242	2005 SA_{93}	—	September 24, 2005	Kitt Peak	Spacewatch	·	4.6 km	MPC · JPL
290243	2005 SD_{95}	—	September 25, 2005	Palomar	NEAT	·	5.7 km	MPC · JPL
290244	2005 SB_{98}	—	September 25, 2005	Kitt Peak	Spacewatch	EOS	2.0 km	MPC · JPL
290245	2005 SH_{98}	—	September 25, 2005	Kitt Peak	Spacewatch	WIT	1.2 km	MPC · JPL
290246	2005 SU_{101}	—	September 25, 2005	Kitt Peak	Spacewatch	EOS	2.3 km	MPC · JPL
290247	2005 SW_{101}	—	September 25, 2005	Kitt Peak	Spacewatch	·	2.3 km	MPC · JPL
290248	2005 SJ_{102}	—	September 25, 2005	Kitt Peak	Spacewatch	·	970 m	MPC · JPL
290249	2005 SV_{104}	—	September 25, 2005	Kitt Peak	Spacewatch	·	3.1 km	MPC · JPL
290250	2005 SD_{107}	—	September 26, 2005	Catalina	CSS	·	2.2 km	MPC · JPL
290251	2005 SA_{108}	—	September 26, 2005	Kitt Peak	Spacewatch	3:2	5.1 km	MPC · JPL
290252	2005 SC_{110}	—	September 26, 2005	Kitt Peak	Spacewatch	HIL · 3:2	5.1 km	MPC · JPL
290253	2005 SB_{111}	—	September 26, 2005	Kitt Peak	Spacewatch	·	2.3 km	MPC · JPL
290254	2005 SE_{113}	—	September 26, 2005	Palomar	NEAT	·	2.6 km	MPC · JPL
290255	2005 SL_{113}	—	September 27, 2005	Kitt Peak	Spacewatch	·	1.7 km	MPC · JPL
290256	2005 SB_{114}	—	September 27, 2005	Kitt Peak	Spacewatch	KOR	1.3 km	MPC · JPL
290257	2005 SA_{118}	—	September 28, 2005	Palomar	NEAT	SUL	2.6 km	MPC · JPL
290258	2005 SD_{121}	—	September 29, 2005	Kitt Peak	Spacewatch	·	2.2 km	MPC · JPL
290259	2005 SW_{122}	—	September 29, 2005	Anderson Mesa	LONEOS	·	5.8 km	MPC · JPL
290260	2005 SK_{123}	—	September 29, 2005	Anderson Mesa	LONEOS	(5)	1.3 km	MPC · JPL
290261	2005 SX_{123}	—	September 29, 2005	Anderson Mesa	LONEOS	·	810 m	MPC · JPL
290262	2005 ST_{124}	—	September 29, 2005	Kitt Peak	Spacewatch	·	2.3 km	MPC · JPL
290263	2005 SN_{126}	—	September 29, 2005	Palomar	NEAT	NYS	1.2 km	MPC · JPL
290264	2005 SD_{127}	—	September 29, 2005	Mount Lemmon	Mount Lemmon Survey	·	2.9 km	MPC · JPL
290265	2005 SG_{133}	—	September 29, 2005	Kitt Peak	Spacewatch	·	1.0 km	MPC · JPL
290266	2005 SA_{136}	—	September 24, 2005	Kitt Peak	Spacewatch	·	2.4 km	MPC · JPL
290267	2005 SC_{137}	—	September 24, 2005	Kitt Peak	Spacewatch	MRX	1.5 km	MPC · JPL
290268	2005 SX_{138}	—	September 25, 2005	Kitt Peak	Spacewatch	·	690 m	MPC · JPL
290269	2005 SW_{139}	—	September 25, 2005	Kitt Peak	Spacewatch	·	2.7 km	MPC · JPL
290270	2005 SS_{142}	—	September 25, 2005	Kitt Peak	Spacewatch	·	3.8 km	MPC · JPL
290271	2005 SV_{143}	—	September 25, 2005	Kitt Peak	Spacewatch	·	1.8 km	MPC · JPL
290272	2005 SN_{145}	—	September 25, 2005	Kitt Peak	Spacewatch	·	1.7 km	MPC · JPL
290273	2005 SS_{145}	—	September 25, 2005	Kitt Peak	Spacewatch	KOR	1.4 km	MPC · JPL
290274	2005 SA_{147}	—	September 25, 2005	Kitt Peak	Spacewatch	·	1.2 km	MPC · JPL
290275	2005 SV_{147}	—	September 25, 2005	Kitt Peak	Spacewatch	·	1.4 km	MPC · JPL
290276	2005 SO_{148}	—	September 25, 2005	Kitt Peak	Spacewatch	·	2.2 km	MPC · JPL
290277	2005 SS_{148}	—	September 25, 2005	Kitt Peak	Spacewatch	·	2.0 km	MPC · JPL
290278	2005 SO_{149}	—	September 25, 2005	Kitt Peak	Spacewatch	·	1.5 km	MPC · JPL
290279	2005 ST_{149}	—	September 25, 2005	Kitt Peak	Spacewatch	·	2.6 km	MPC · JPL
290280	2005 SU_{149}	—	September 25, 2005	Kitt Peak	Spacewatch	·	1.1 km	MPC · JPL
290281	2005 SD_{154}	—	September 26, 2005	Kitt Peak	Spacewatch	NYS	1.3 km	MPC · JPL
290282	2005 SA_{156}	—	September 26, 2005	Kitt Peak	Spacewatch	TEL	1.7 km	MPC · JPL
290283	2005 SR_{157}	—	September 26, 2005	Kitt Peak	Spacewatch	·	960 m	MPC · JPL
290284	2005 SF_{160}	—	September 27, 2005	Kitt Peak	Spacewatch	·	2.0 km	MPC · JPL
290285	2005 SH_{160}	—	September 27, 2005	Kitt Peak	Spacewatch	·	1.3 km	MPC · JPL
290286	2005 SM_{160}	—	September 27, 2005	Kitt Peak	Spacewatch	·	1.9 km	MPC · JPL
290287	2005 SX_{160}	—	September 27, 2005	Kitt Peak	Spacewatch	KOR	1.3 km	MPC · JPL
290288	2005 SV_{164}	—	September 27, 2005	Palomar	NEAT	·	2.6 km	MPC · JPL
290289	2005 SU_{165}	—	September 28, 2005	Palomar	NEAT	·	2.2 km	MPC · JPL
290290	2005 SO_{167}	—	September 28, 2005	Palomar	NEAT	·	3.0 km	MPC · JPL
290291	2005 SM_{168}	—	September 29, 2005	Kitt Peak	Spacewatch	CYB	4.9 km	MPC · JPL
290292	2005 SZ_{168}	—	September 29, 2005	Kitt Peak	Spacewatch	·	1.2 km	MPC · JPL
290293	2005 SE_{169}	—	September 29, 2005	Kitt Peak	Spacewatch	NEM	2.9 km	MPC · JPL
290294	2005 SV_{169}	—	September 29, 2005	Kitt Peak	Spacewatch	HYG	2.7 km	MPC · JPL
290295	2005 SN_{170}	—	September 29, 2005	Kitt Peak	Spacewatch	·	3.4 km	MPC · JPL
290296	2005 ST_{171}	—	September 29, 2005	Kitt Peak	Spacewatch	HOF	3.6 km	MPC · JPL
290297	2005 SV_{175}	—	September 29, 2005	Kitt Peak	Spacewatch	·	1.8 km	MPC · JPL
290298	2005 SQ_{176}	—	September 29, 2005	Kitt Peak	Spacewatch	·	1.3 km	MPC · JPL
290299	2005 SS_{176}	—	September 29, 2005	Kitt Peak	Spacewatch	·	760 m	MPC · JPL
290300	2005 SF_{178}	—	September 29, 2005	Kitt Peak	Spacewatch	MRX	1.3 km	MPC · JPL

== 290301–290400 ==
back to top

Designation			Discovery			Properties		Ref
Permanent	Provisional	Named after	Date	Site	Discoverer(s)	Category	Diam.	Ref
290301	2005 SE_{179}	—	September 29, 2005	Anderson Mesa	LONEOS	·	930 m	MPC · JPL
290302	2005 SX_{179}	—	September 29, 2005	Anderson Mesa	LONEOS	·	3.4 km	MPC · JPL
290303	2005 SA_{181}	—	September 29, 2005	Kitt Peak	Spacewatch	LUT	6.6 km	MPC · JPL
290304	2005 SU_{181}	—	September 29, 2005	Kitt Peak	Spacewatch	·	1.8 km	MPC · JPL
290305	2005 SX_{181}	—	September 29, 2005	Kitt Peak	Spacewatch	·	1.9 km	MPC · JPL
290306	2005 SZ_{181}	—	September 29, 2005	Kitt Peak	Spacewatch	AGN	1.4 km	MPC · JPL
290307	2005 SA_{182}	—	September 29, 2005	Kitt Peak	Spacewatch	EOS	2.4 km	MPC · JPL
290308	2005 SM_{184}	—	September 29, 2005	Kitt Peak	Spacewatch	·	2.2 km	MPC · JPL
290309	2005 SN_{184}	—	September 29, 2005	Kitt Peak	Spacewatch	·	3.5 km	MPC · JPL
290310	2005 SM_{186}	—	September 29, 2005	Mount Lemmon	Mount Lemmon Survey	·	2.7 km	MPC · JPL
290311	2005 SD_{190}	—	September 29, 2005	Kitt Peak	Spacewatch	·	2.8 km	MPC · JPL
290312	2005 SL_{191}	—	September 29, 2005	Palomar	NEAT	·	1.8 km	MPC · JPL
290313	2005 SS_{191}	—	September 29, 2005	Mount Lemmon	Mount Lemmon Survey	·	1.7 km	MPC · JPL
290314	2005 SP_{195}	—	September 30, 2005	Catalina	CSS	·	4.7 km	MPC · JPL
290315	2005 ST_{195}	—	September 30, 2005	Kitt Peak	Spacewatch	KOR	1.2 km	MPC · JPL
290316	2005 SV_{195}	—	September 30, 2005	Kitt Peak	Spacewatch	·	1.9 km	MPC · JPL
290317	2005 SJ_{198}	—	September 30, 2005	Mount Lemmon	Mount Lemmon Survey	KOR	1.4 km	MPC · JPL
290318	2005 SW_{202}	—	September 30, 2005	Mount Lemmon	Mount Lemmon Survey	KOR	1.4 km	MPC · JPL
290319	2005 SP_{204}	—	September 30, 2005	Anderson Mesa	LONEOS	BRG	1.6 km	MPC · JPL
290320	2005 SK_{205}	—	September 30, 2005	Palomar	NEAT	·	4.8 km	MPC · JPL
290321	2005 SR_{207}	—	September 30, 2005	Kitt Peak	Spacewatch	·	1.7 km	MPC · JPL
290322	2005 SH_{211}	—	September 30, 2005	Palomar	NEAT	·	2.6 km	MPC · JPL
290323	2005 SO_{211}	—	September 30, 2005	Mount Lemmon	Mount Lemmon Survey	·	1.4 km	MPC · JPL
290324	2005 SM_{213}	—	September 30, 2005	Kitt Peak	Spacewatch	VER	3.7 km	MPC · JPL
290325	2005 SL_{214}	—	September 30, 2005	Catalina	CSS	·	4.5 km	MPC · JPL
290326	2005 SY_{215}	—	September 30, 2005	Anderson Mesa	LONEOS	·	1.9 km	MPC · JPL
290327	2005 SJ_{217}	—	September 30, 2005	Mount Lemmon	Mount Lemmon Survey	·	2.7 km	MPC · JPL
290328	2005 SX_{217}	—	September 30, 2005	Mount Lemmon	Mount Lemmon Survey	·	990 m	MPC · JPL
290329	2005 SV_{224}	—	September 29, 2005	Mount Lemmon	Mount Lemmon Survey	·	1.8 km	MPC · JPL
290330	2005 SR_{225}	—	September 29, 2005	Kitt Peak	Spacewatch	·	3.2 km	MPC · JPL
290331	2005 SU_{226}	—	September 30, 2005	Kitt Peak	Spacewatch	THM	3.0 km	MPC · JPL
290332	2005 SZ_{226}	—	September 30, 2005	Kitt Peak	Spacewatch	·	1.8 km	MPC · JPL
290333	2005 SY_{227}	—	September 30, 2005	Kitt Peak	Spacewatch	·	1.9 km	MPC · JPL
290334	2005 SP_{231}	—	September 30, 2005	Mount Lemmon	Mount Lemmon Survey	KOR	1.5 km	MPC · JPL
290335	2005 SF_{235}	—	September 29, 2005	Mount Lemmon	Mount Lemmon Survey	·	1.8 km	MPC · JPL
290336	2005 ST_{235}	—	September 29, 2005	Kitt Peak	Spacewatch	·	1.4 km	MPC · JPL
290337	2005 SZ_{235}	—	September 29, 2005	Kitt Peak	Spacewatch	AEO	1.4 km	MPC · JPL
290338	2005 SR_{236}	—	September 29, 2005	Kitt Peak	Spacewatch	·	830 m	MPC · JPL
290339	2005 SC_{237}	—	September 29, 2005	Kitt Peak	Spacewatch	·	2.2 km	MPC · JPL
290340	2005 SH_{238}	—	September 29, 2005	Kitt Peak	Spacewatch	·	2.1 km	MPC · JPL
290341	2005 SV_{238}	—	September 30, 2005	Kitt Peak	Spacewatch	·	2.2 km	MPC · JPL
290342	2005 SP_{239}	—	September 30, 2005	Mount Lemmon	Mount Lemmon Survey	·	1.8 km	MPC · JPL
290343	2005 SJ_{245}	—	September 30, 2005	Mount Lemmon	Mount Lemmon Survey	·	3.2 km	MPC · JPL
290344	2005 SO_{246}	—	September 30, 2005	Kitt Peak	Spacewatch	EOS	3.6 km	MPC · JPL
290345	2005 SN_{247}	—	September 30, 2005	Kitt Peak	Spacewatch	·	1.8 km	MPC · JPL
290346	2005 SB_{248}	—	September 30, 2005	Kitt Peak	Spacewatch	·	2.0 km	MPC · JPL
290347	2005 SC_{248}	—	September 30, 2005	Kitt Peak	Spacewatch	KOR	1.3 km	MPC · JPL
290348	2005 SZ_{248}	—	September 30, 2005	Mount Lemmon	Mount Lemmon Survey	·	1.2 km	MPC · JPL
290349	2005 SJ_{250}	—	September 23, 2005	Catalina	CSS	·	2.3 km	MPC · JPL
290350	2005 SY_{250}	—	September 23, 2005	Kitt Peak	Spacewatch	NEM	3.4 km	MPC · JPL
290351	2005 SO_{251}	—	September 24, 2005	Palomar	NEAT	(13314)	2.6 km	MPC · JPL
290352	2005 SY_{251}	—	September 24, 2005	Palomar	NEAT	·	2.8 km	MPC · JPL
290353	2005 SC_{253}	—	September 24, 2005	Palomar	NEAT	·	2.2 km	MPC · JPL
290354	2005 SQ_{258}	—	September 23, 2005	Kitt Peak	Spacewatch	·	2.2 km	MPC · JPL
290355	2005 SJ_{259}	—	September 24, 2005	Anderson Mesa	LONEOS	·	4.2 km	MPC · JPL
290356	2005 ST_{260}	—	September 24, 2005	Kitt Peak	Spacewatch	THM	2.3 km	MPC · JPL
290357	2005 SF_{261}	—	September 27, 2005	Junk Bond	D. Healy	·	720 m	MPC · JPL
290358	2005 SD_{262}	—	September 23, 2005	Kitt Peak	Spacewatch	·	3.1 km	MPC · JPL
290359	2005 SX_{262}	—	September 23, 2005	Kitt Peak	Spacewatch	·	2.8 km	MPC · JPL
290360	2005 SV_{263}	—	September 23, 2005	Kitt Peak	Spacewatch	NYS	1.3 km	MPC · JPL
290361	2005 SD_{264}	—	September 24, 2005	Palomar	NEAT	·	910 m	MPC · JPL
290362	2005 SK_{264}	—	September 24, 2005	Kitt Peak	Spacewatch	HOF	3.2 km	MPC · JPL
290363	2005 SW_{264}	—	September 25, 2005	Kitt Peak	Spacewatch	·	2.5 km	MPC · JPL
290364	2005 SK_{265}	—	September 26, 2005	Palomar	NEAT	·	1.4 km	MPC · JPL
290365	2005 SV_{266}	—	September 29, 2005	Anderson Mesa	LONEOS	·	3.0 km	MPC · JPL
290366	2005 SS_{267}	—	September 30, 2005	Palomar	NEAT	·	3.4 km	MPC · JPL
290367	2005 SR_{269}	—	September 28, 2005	Palomar	NEAT	·	4.5 km	MPC · JPL
290368	2005 SC_{270}	—	September 29, 2005	Kitt Peak	Spacewatch	·	2.3 km	MPC · JPL
290369	2005 SK_{272}	—	September 29, 2005	Anderson Mesa	LONEOS	KON	2.3 km	MPC · JPL
290370	2005 SS_{272}	—	September 30, 2005	Anderson Mesa	LONEOS	615	1.5 km	MPC · JPL
290371	2005 SA_{275}	—	September 30, 2005	Mount Lemmon	Mount Lemmon Survey	THM	3.2 km	MPC · JPL
290372	2005 SR_{278}	—	September 29, 2005	Mount Lemmon	Mount Lemmon Survey	·	1.8 km	MPC · JPL
290373	2005 SD_{279}	—	September 29, 2005	Kitt Peak	Spacewatch	·	1.3 km	MPC · JPL
290374	2005 SR_{280}	—	September 27, 2005	Palomar	NEAT	NEM	3.5 km	MPC · JPL
290375	2005 SO_{283}	—	September 21, 2005	Apache Point	A. C. Becker	·	1.5 km	MPC · JPL
290376	2005 SL_{284}	—	September 25, 2005	Apache Point	A. C. Becker	·	3.2 km	MPC · JPL
290377	2005 SU_{284}	—	September 25, 2005	Apache Point	A. C. Becker	·	1.9 km	MPC · JPL
290378	2005 SG_{289}	—	September 23, 2005	Kitt Peak	Spacewatch	THM	2.5 km	MPC · JPL
290379	2005 SQ_{289}	—	September 29, 2005	Mount Lemmon	Mount Lemmon Survey	CYB	4.0 km	MPC · JPL
290380	2005 SZ_{290}	—	September 25, 2005	Kitt Peak	Spacewatch	·	2.6 km	MPC · JPL
290381	2005 SB_{291}	—	September 24, 2005	Kitt Peak	Spacewatch	·	2.7 km	MPC · JPL
290382	2005 SB_{292}	—	September 28, 2005	Palomar	NEAT	·	2.3 km	MPC · JPL
290383	2005 SK_{292}	—	September 29, 2005	Mount Lemmon	Mount Lemmon Survey	·	2.0 km	MPC · JPL
290384	2005 SN_{292}	—	September 30, 2005	Anderson Mesa	LONEOS	·	3.4 km	MPC · JPL
290385	2005 SE_{293}	—	September 28, 2005	Palomar	NEAT	·	5.0 km	MPC · JPL
290386	2005 SS_{293}	—	September 30, 2005	Catalina	CSS	EOS	2.9 km	MPC · JPL
290387	2005 TW_{6}	—	October 1, 2005	Catalina	CSS	·	1.1 km	MPC · JPL
290388	2005 TJ_{7}	—	October 1, 2005	Catalina	CSS	·	4.7 km	MPC · JPL
290389	2005 TH_{8}	—	October 1, 2005	Kitt Peak	Spacewatch	SYL · CYB	4.8 km	MPC · JPL
290390	2005 TM_{8}	—	October 1, 2005	Kitt Peak	Spacewatch	KOR	1.7 km	MPC · JPL
290391	2005 TF_{9}	—	October 1, 2005	Kitt Peak	Spacewatch	·	1.9 km	MPC · JPL
290392	2005 TL_{16}	—	October 1, 2005	Kitt Peak	Spacewatch	·	3.2 km	MPC · JPL
290393	2005 TQ_{21}	—	October 1, 2005	Kitt Peak	Spacewatch	·	1.7 km	MPC · JPL
290394	2005 TW_{22}	—	October 1, 2005	Catalina	CSS	·	1.1 km	MPC · JPL
290395	2005 TT_{23}	—	October 1, 2005	Catalina	CSS	·	2.0 km	MPC · JPL
290396	2005 TA_{25}	—	October 1, 2005	Mount Lemmon	Mount Lemmon Survey	·	850 m	MPC · JPL
290397	2005 TT_{27}	—	October 1, 2005	Catalina	CSS	GEF	1.7 km	MPC · JPL
290398	2005 TX_{27}	—	October 1, 2005	Mount Lemmon	Mount Lemmon Survey	·	2.8 km	MPC · JPL
290399	2005 TC_{30}	—	October 4, 2005	Palomar	NEAT	EUN	1.8 km	MPC · JPL
290400	2005 TE_{32}	—	October 1, 2005	Kitt Peak	Spacewatch	·	1.9 km	MPC · JPL

== 290401–290500 ==
back to top

Designation			Discovery			Properties		Ref
Permanent	Provisional	Named after	Date	Site	Discoverer(s)	Category	Diam.	Ref
290401	2005 TY_{32}	—	October 1, 2005	Kitt Peak	Spacewatch	·	1.9 km	MPC · JPL
290402	2005 TQ_{35}	—	October 1, 2005	Kitt Peak	Spacewatch	NYS	1.4 km	MPC · JPL
290403	2005 TG_{36}	—	October 1, 2005	Kitt Peak	Spacewatch	KOR	1.5 km	MPC · JPL
290404	2005 TO_{36}	—	October 1, 2005	Mount Lemmon	Mount Lemmon Survey	·	1.9 km	MPC · JPL
290405	2005 TV_{38}	—	October 1, 2005	Catalina	CSS	·	2.3 km	MPC · JPL
290406	2005 TV_{39}	—	October 1, 2005	Kitt Peak	Spacewatch	KOR	1.7 km	MPC · JPL
290407	2005 TX_{40}	—	October 1, 2005	Mount Lemmon	Mount Lemmon Survey	·	2.0 km	MPC · JPL
290408	2005 TU_{43}	—	October 5, 2005	Socorro	LINEAR	NYS	1.1 km	MPC · JPL
290409	2005 TX_{47}	—	October 6, 2005	Bergisch Gladbach	W. Bickel	·	2.4 km	MPC · JPL
290410	2005 TG_{48}	—	October 6, 2005	Mount Lemmon	Mount Lemmon Survey	·	2.7 km	MPC · JPL
290411	2005 TJ_{53}	—	October 8, 2005	Moletai	K. Černis, Zdanavicius, J.	NYS	960 m	MPC · JPL
290412	2005 TF_{55}	—	October 5, 2005	Kitt Peak	Spacewatch	(31811)	3.9 km	MPC · JPL
290413	2005 TC_{56}	—	October 6, 2005	Kitt Peak	Spacewatch	EOS	2.7 km	MPC · JPL
290414	2005 TL_{57}	—	October 1, 2005	Mount Lemmon	Mount Lemmon Survey	PAD	2.1 km	MPC · JPL
290415	2005 TF_{59}	—	October 1, 2005	Mount Lemmon	Mount Lemmon Survey	·	1.8 km	MPC · JPL
290416	2005 TY_{60}	—	October 3, 2005	Kitt Peak	Spacewatch	·	2.9 km	MPC · JPL
290417	2005 TU_{62}	—	October 4, 2005	Mount Lemmon	Mount Lemmon Survey	·	1.4 km	MPC · JPL
290418	2005 TC_{64}	—	October 6, 2005	Anderson Mesa	LONEOS	·	2.0 km	MPC · JPL
290419	2005 TL_{64}	—	October 6, 2005	Mount Lemmon	Mount Lemmon Survey	·	2.6 km	MPC · JPL
290420	2005 TJ_{75}	—	October 3, 2005	Kitt Peak	Spacewatch	HOF	3.0 km	MPC · JPL
290421	2005 TH_{76}	—	October 5, 2005	Catalina	CSS	·	1.7 km	MPC · JPL
290422	2005 TK_{77}	—	October 6, 2005	Anderson Mesa	LONEOS	NYS	1.2 km	MPC · JPL
290423	2005 TE_{79}	—	October 7, 2005	Kitt Peak	Spacewatch	·	1.7 km	MPC · JPL
290424	2005 TK_{81}	—	October 3, 2005	Kitt Peak	Spacewatch	·	3.5 km	MPC · JPL
290425	2005 TK_{82}	—	October 3, 2005	Kitt Peak	Spacewatch	·	1.2 km	MPC · JPL
290426	2005 TO_{90}	—	October 6, 2005	Anderson Mesa	LONEOS	·	3.4 km	MPC · JPL
290427	2005 TB_{95}	—	October 6, 2005	Kitt Peak	Spacewatch	·	3.4 km	MPC · JPL
290428	2005 TE_{96}	—	October 6, 2005	Mount Lemmon	Mount Lemmon Survey	·	1.6 km	MPC · JPL
290429	2005 TM_{96}	—	October 6, 2005	Mount Lemmon	Mount Lemmon Survey	·	990 m	MPC · JPL
290430	2005 TO_{98}	—	October 6, 2005	Anderson Mesa	LONEOS	·	2.6 km	MPC · JPL
290431	2005 TF_{100}	—	October 7, 2005	Kitt Peak	Spacewatch	·	1.2 km	MPC · JPL
290432	2005 TL_{100}	—	October 7, 2005	Mount Lemmon	Mount Lemmon Survey	·	2.0 km	MPC · JPL
290433	2005 TR_{109}	—	October 7, 2005	Kitt Peak	Spacewatch	AGN	1.4 km	MPC · JPL
290434	2005 TP_{110}	—	October 7, 2005	Kitt Peak	Spacewatch	·	1.5 km	MPC · JPL
290435	2005 TS_{110}	—	October 7, 2005	Kitt Peak	Spacewatch	HOF	3.2 km	MPC · JPL
290436	2005 TH_{112}	—	October 7, 2005	Kitt Peak	Spacewatch	(13314)	1.9 km	MPC · JPL
290437	2005 TV_{114}	—	October 7, 2005	Kitt Peak	Spacewatch	·	1.6 km	MPC · JPL
290438	2005 TT_{115}	—	October 7, 2005	Kitt Peak	Spacewatch	NYS	1.2 km	MPC · JPL
290439	2005 TL_{116}	—	October 7, 2005	Kitt Peak	Spacewatch	(16286)	2.1 km	MPC · JPL
290440	2005 TO_{116}	—	October 7, 2005	Kitt Peak	Spacewatch	NYS	1.1 km	MPC · JPL
290441	2005 TP_{116}	—	October 7, 2005	Kitt Peak	Spacewatch	HOF	2.8 km	MPC · JPL
290442	2005 TF_{122}	—	October 7, 2005	Kitt Peak	Spacewatch	·	2.2 km	MPC · JPL
290443	2005 TM_{125}	—	October 7, 2005	Kitt Peak	Spacewatch	·	1.7 km	MPC · JPL
290444	2005 TX_{125}	—	October 7, 2005	Kitt Peak	Spacewatch	·	2.8 km	MPC · JPL
290445	2005 TE_{132}	—	October 7, 2005	Kitt Peak	Spacewatch	·	1.9 km	MPC · JPL
290446	2005 TK_{132}	—	October 7, 2005	Kitt Peak	Spacewatch	KOR	1.4 km	MPC · JPL
290447	2005 TC_{133}	—	October 7, 2005	Kitt Peak	Spacewatch	fast	3.4 km	MPC · JPL
290448	2005 TW_{137}	—	October 6, 2005	Kitt Peak	Spacewatch	·	2.6 km	MPC · JPL
290449	2005 TJ_{139}	—	October 8, 2005	Kitt Peak	Spacewatch	·	1.3 km	MPC · JPL
290450	2005 TR_{145}	—	October 8, 2005	Kitt Peak	Spacewatch	HYG	2.9 km	MPC · JPL
290451	2005 TW_{151}	—	October 10, 2005	Kitt Peak	Spacewatch	·	4.0 km	MPC · JPL
290452	2005 TW_{152}	—	October 5, 2005	Catalina	CSS	·	5.8 km	MPC · JPL
290453	2005 TZ_{155}	—	October 9, 2005	Kitt Peak	Spacewatch	AGN	1.5 km	MPC · JPL
290454	2005 TT_{159}	—	October 9, 2005	Kitt Peak	Spacewatch	·	2.3 km	MPC · JPL
290455	2005 TJ_{160}	—	October 9, 2005	Kitt Peak	Spacewatch	615	1.5 km	MPC · JPL
290456	2005 TQ_{162}	—	October 9, 2005	Kitt Peak	Spacewatch	·	3.1 km	MPC · JPL
290457	2005 TG_{164}	—	October 9, 2005	Kitt Peak	Spacewatch	NYS	1.4 km	MPC · JPL
290458	2005 TH_{164}	—	October 9, 2005	Kitt Peak	Spacewatch	·	2.3 km	MPC · JPL
290459	2005 TC_{167}	—	October 9, 2005	Kitt Peak	Spacewatch	·	2.2 km	MPC · JPL
290460	2005 TD_{168}	—	October 9, 2005	Kitt Peak	Spacewatch	·	1.9 km	MPC · JPL
290461	2005 TL_{168}	—	October 9, 2005	Kitt Peak	Spacewatch	·	4.4 km	MPC · JPL
290462	2005 TR_{168}	—	October 9, 2005	Kitt Peak	Spacewatch	EOS	2.1 km	MPC · JPL
290463	2005 TK_{169}	—	October 9, 2005	Kitt Peak	Spacewatch	AGN	1.5 km	MPC · JPL
290464	2005 TS_{169}	—	October 10, 2005	Goodricke-Pigott	R. A. Tucker	AGN	1.6 km	MPC · JPL
290465	2005 TY_{169}	—	October 10, 2005	Anderson Mesa	LONEOS	·	4.4 km	MPC · JPL
290466	2005 TH_{170}	—	October 10, 2005	Kitt Peak	Spacewatch	·	2.2 km	MPC · JPL
290467	2005 TY_{172}	—	October 13, 2005	Socorro	LINEAR	·	1.9 km	MPC · JPL
290468	2005 TL_{174}	—	October 3, 2005	Catalina	CSS	·	2.8 km	MPC · JPL
290469	2005 TC_{181}	—	October 1, 2005	Kitt Peak	Spacewatch	HIL · 3:2	4.4 km	MPC · JPL
290470	2005 TH_{181}	—	October 1, 2005	Kitt Peak	Spacewatch	THM	3.0 km	MPC · JPL
290471	2005 TR_{181}	—	October 1, 2005	Mount Lemmon	Mount Lemmon Survey	HOF	3.1 km	MPC · JPL
290472	2005 TW_{181}	—	October 2, 2005	Palomar	NEAT	·	1.7 km	MPC · JPL
290473	2005 TL_{186}	—	October 7, 2005	Kitt Peak	Spacewatch	·	780 m	MPC · JPL
290474	2005 TN_{186}	—	October 9, 2005	Kitt Peak	Spacewatch	·	1.5 km	MPC · JPL
290475	2005 TY_{188}	—	October 13, 2005	Kitt Peak	Spacewatch	·	3.3 km	MPC · JPL
290476	2005 TD_{190}	—	October 1, 2005	Kitt Peak	Spacewatch	·	2.7 km	MPC · JPL
290477	2005 TH_{190}	—	October 1, 2005	Mount Lemmon	Mount Lemmon Survey	·	1.6 km	MPC · JPL
290478	2005 TG_{192}	—	October 8, 2005	Catalina	CSS	·	3.6 km	MPC · JPL
290479	2005 TH_{192}	—	October 10, 2005	Anderson Mesa	LONEOS	·	2.6 km	MPC · JPL
290480	2005 TB_{193}	—	October 11, 2005	Apache Point	A. C. Becker	·	1.9 km	MPC · JPL
290481	2005 TF_{193}	—	October 1, 2005	Mount Lemmon	Mount Lemmon Survey	·	1.6 km	MPC · JPL
290482	2005 TV_{193}	—	October 1, 2005	Mount Lemmon	Mount Lemmon Survey	AST	1.7 km	MPC · JPL
290483	2005 TR_{194}	—	October 1, 2005	Mount Lemmon	Mount Lemmon Survey	·	3.3 km	MPC · JPL
290484	2005 TW_{195}	—	October 1, 2005	Kitt Peak	Spacewatch	KOR	1.4 km	MPC · JPL
290485	2005 TU_{196}	—	October 1, 2005	Anderson Mesa	LONEOS	·	3.9 km	MPC · JPL
290486	2005 UX_{1}	—	October 22, 2005	Junk Bond	D. Healy	·	2.2 km	MPC · JPL
290487	2005 UH_{4}	—	October 25, 2005	Goodricke-Pigott	R. A. Tucker	·	2.9 km	MPC · JPL
290488	2005 UD_{6}	—	October 27, 2005	Altschwendt	Altschwendt	·	820 m	MPC · JPL
290489	2005 UW_{9}	—	October 21, 2005	Palomar	NEAT	·	3.0 km	MPC · JPL
290490	2005 UT_{10}	—	October 22, 2005	Kitt Peak	Spacewatch	·	2.1 km	MPC · JPL
290491	2005 UC_{12}	—	October 22, 2005	Kitt Peak	Spacewatch	KOR	1.7 km	MPC · JPL
290492	2005 UZ_{13}	—	October 22, 2005	Kitt Peak	Spacewatch	·	2.1 km	MPC · JPL
290493	2005 UQ_{15}	—	October 22, 2005	Kitt Peak	Spacewatch	·	1.4 km	MPC · JPL
290494	2005 UA_{16}	—	October 22, 2005	Kitt Peak	Spacewatch	·	1.7 km	MPC · JPL
290495	2005 UW_{17}	—	October 22, 2005	Catalina	CSS	·	2.5 km	MPC · JPL
290496	2005 UE_{19}	—	October 22, 2005	Catalina	CSS	·	2.0 km	MPC · JPL
290497	2005 UQ_{20}	—	October 22, 2005	Kitt Peak	Spacewatch	EUP	4.2 km	MPC · JPL
290498	2005 UA_{21}	—	October 23, 2005	Kitt Peak	Spacewatch	·	4.1 km	MPC · JPL
290499	2005 UO_{21}	—	October 23, 2005	Kitt Peak	Spacewatch	HOF	3.4 km	MPC · JPL
290500	2005 UA_{22}	—	October 23, 2005	Kitt Peak	Spacewatch	·	5.4 km	MPC · JPL

== 290501–290600 ==
back to top

Designation			Discovery			Properties		Ref
Permanent	Provisional	Named after	Date	Site	Discoverer(s)	Category	Diam.	Ref
290501	2005 UC_{23}	—	October 23, 2005	Kitt Peak	Spacewatch	·	3.8 km	MPC · JPL
290502	2005 UZ_{24}	—	October 23, 2005	Kitt Peak	Spacewatch	·	3.3 km	MPC · JPL
290503	2005 UM_{26}	—	October 23, 2005	Catalina	CSS	·	1.8 km	MPC · JPL
290504	2005 US_{28}	—	October 23, 2005	Kitt Peak	Spacewatch	·	3.8 km	MPC · JPL
290505	2005 UW_{28}	—	October 23, 2005	Kitt Peak	Spacewatch	·	780 m	MPC · JPL
290506	2005 UE_{29}	—	October 23, 2005	Catalina	CSS	·	860 m	MPC · JPL
290507	2005 UO_{29}	—	October 23, 2005	Catalina	CSS	·	2.9 km	MPC · JPL
290508	2005 UB_{32}	—	October 24, 2005	Kitt Peak	Spacewatch	MAS	830 m	MPC · JPL
290509	2005 UD_{33}	—	October 24, 2005	Kitt Peak	Spacewatch	·	900 m	MPC · JPL
290510	2005 UQ_{33}	—	October 24, 2005	Kitt Peak	Spacewatch	·	840 m	MPC · JPL
290511	2005 UT_{33}	—	October 24, 2005	Kitt Peak	Spacewatch	·	4.1 km	MPC · JPL
290512	2005 UV_{33}	—	October 24, 2005	Kitt Peak	Spacewatch	KOR	1.3 km	MPC · JPL
290513	2005 UY_{35}	—	October 24, 2005	Kitt Peak	Spacewatch	THM	2.7 km	MPC · JPL
290514	2005 UG_{37}	—	October 24, 2005	Kitt Peak	Spacewatch	·	2.1 km	MPC · JPL
290515	2005 UO_{37}	—	October 24, 2005	Kitt Peak	Spacewatch	·	2.4 km	MPC · JPL
290516	2005 UU_{37}	—	October 24, 2005	Kitt Peak	Spacewatch	AST	1.8 km	MPC · JPL
290517	2005 UW_{37}	—	October 24, 2005	Kitt Peak	Spacewatch	·	640 m	MPC · JPL
290518	2005 UJ_{38}	—	October 24, 2005	Kitt Peak	Spacewatch	·	1.8 km	MPC · JPL
290519	2005 UJ_{39}	—	October 24, 2005	Kitt Peak	Spacewatch	·	1.9 km	MPC · JPL
290520	2005 UW_{41}	—	October 25, 2005	Kitt Peak	Spacewatch	·	980 m	MPC · JPL
290521	2005 UC_{42}	—	October 21, 2005	Palomar	NEAT	·	900 m	MPC · JPL
290522	2005 US_{42}	—	October 22, 2005	Kitt Peak	Spacewatch	·	3.2 km	MPC · JPL
290523	2005 UB_{44}	—	October 22, 2005	Kitt Peak	Spacewatch	·	2.3 km	MPC · JPL
290524	2005 UH_{44}	—	October 22, 2005	Kitt Peak	Spacewatch	EOS	2.5 km	MPC · JPL
290525	2005 UK_{44}	—	October 22, 2005	Kitt Peak	Spacewatch	·	1.8 km	MPC · JPL
290526	2005 UD_{45}	—	October 22, 2005	Kitt Peak	Spacewatch	·	2.1 km	MPC · JPL
290527	2005 UE_{45}	—	October 22, 2005	Kitt Peak	Spacewatch	·	2.3 km	MPC · JPL
290528	2005 UB_{48}	—	October 22, 2005	Catalina	CSS	·	2.0 km	MPC · JPL
290529	2005 UK_{51}	—	October 23, 2005	Catalina	CSS	·	2.6 km	MPC · JPL
290530	2005 UX_{51}	—	October 23, 2005	Catalina	CSS	EOS	2.8 km	MPC · JPL
290531	2005 UN_{54}	—	October 23, 2005	Catalina	CSS	·	4.0 km	MPC · JPL
290532	2005 UA_{58}	—	October 24, 2005	Kitt Peak	Spacewatch	·	3.0 km	MPC · JPL
290533	2005 UQ_{59}	—	October 25, 2005	Kitt Peak	Spacewatch	KOR	1.3 km	MPC · JPL
290534	2005 UL_{61}	—	October 25, 2005	Catalina	CSS	·	1.1 km	MPC · JPL
290535	2005 UK_{65}	—	October 21, 2005	Palomar	NEAT	·	2.9 km	MPC · JPL
290536	2005 UF_{67}	—	October 22, 2005	Catalina	CSS	·	2.4 km	MPC · JPL
290537	2005 UB_{69}	—	October 23, 2005	Palomar	NEAT	EUN	2.0 km	MPC · JPL
290538	2005 UX_{69}	—	October 23, 2005	Catalina	CSS	·	1.1 km	MPC · JPL
290539	2005 UR_{71}	—	October 23, 2005	Catalina	CSS	·	2.9 km	MPC · JPL
290540	2005 UY_{71}	—	October 23, 2005	Catalina	CSS	EOS	3.1 km	MPC · JPL
290541	2005 UL_{72}	—	October 23, 2005	Catalina	CSS	·	2.8 km	MPC · JPL
290542	2005 UM_{77}	—	October 24, 2005	Kitt Peak	Spacewatch	·	2.2 km	MPC · JPL
290543	2005 UY_{78}	—	October 25, 2005	Catalina	CSS	·	1.7 km	MPC · JPL
290544	2005 UO_{82}	—	October 22, 2005	Kitt Peak	Spacewatch	·	2.7 km	MPC · JPL
290545	2005 UZ_{82}	—	October 22, 2005	Kitt Peak	Spacewatch	·	910 m	MPC · JPL
290546	2005 UW_{85}	—	October 22, 2005	Kitt Peak	Spacewatch	AGN	1.3 km	MPC · JPL
290547	2005 UE_{89}	—	October 22, 2005	Kitt Peak	Spacewatch	EUN	2.1 km	MPC · JPL
290548	2005 UM_{92}	—	October 22, 2005	Kitt Peak	Spacewatch	·	1 km	MPC · JPL
290549	2005 UX_{92}	—	October 22, 2005	Kitt Peak	Spacewatch	·	2.6 km	MPC · JPL
290550	2005 UD_{94}	—	October 22, 2005	Kitt Peak	Spacewatch	·	3.1 km	MPC · JPL
290551	2005 UE_{96}	—	October 22, 2005	Kitt Peak	Spacewatch	·	1.6 km	MPC · JPL
290552	2005 UV_{96}	—	October 22, 2005	Kitt Peak	Spacewatch	·	3.7 km	MPC · JPL
290553	2005 UK_{97}	—	October 22, 2005	Kitt Peak	Spacewatch	·	2.4 km	MPC · JPL
290554	2005 UG_{101}	—	October 22, 2005	Kitt Peak	Spacewatch	·	2.5 km	MPC · JPL
290555	2005 UY_{103}	—	October 22, 2005	Kitt Peak	Spacewatch	·	650 m	MPC · JPL
290556	2005 UG_{106}	—	October 22, 2005	Kitt Peak	Spacewatch	·	2.0 km	MPC · JPL
290557	2005 UQ_{106}	—	October 22, 2005	Kitt Peak	Spacewatch	(1298)	3.8 km	MPC · JPL
290558	2005 UE_{107}	—	October 22, 2005	Kitt Peak	Spacewatch	·	5.4 km	MPC · JPL
290559	2005 UV_{108}	—	October 22, 2005	Palomar	NEAT	EOS	3.5 km	MPC · JPL
290560	2005 UK_{109}	—	October 22, 2005	Kitt Peak	Spacewatch	·	2.3 km	MPC · JPL
290561	2005 UK_{110}	—	October 22, 2005	Kitt Peak	Spacewatch	·	2.0 km	MPC · JPL
290562	2005 UN_{110}	—	October 22, 2005	Kitt Peak	Spacewatch	·	4.0 km	MPC · JPL
290563	2005 UJ_{111}	—	October 22, 2005	Kitt Peak	Spacewatch	·	2.2 km	MPC · JPL
290564	2005 UX_{111}	—	October 22, 2005	Kitt Peak	Spacewatch	·	1.5 km	MPC · JPL
290565	2005 UT_{112}	—	October 22, 2005	Kitt Peak	Spacewatch	·	2.3 km	MPC · JPL
290566	2005 UH_{115}	—	October 23, 2005	Kitt Peak	Spacewatch	·	690 m	MPC · JPL
290567	2005 UM_{116}	—	October 23, 2005	Kitt Peak	Spacewatch	WIT	1.3 km	MPC · JPL
290568	2005 UA_{117}	—	October 23, 2005	Catalina	CSS	·	1.2 km	MPC · JPL
290569	2005 UK_{119}	—	October 24, 2005	Kitt Peak	Spacewatch	KOR	1.4 km	MPC · JPL
290570	2005 UW_{119}	—	October 24, 2005	Kitt Peak	Spacewatch	KOR	1.4 km	MPC · JPL
290571	2005 UO_{123}	—	October 24, 2005	Kitt Peak	Spacewatch	MRX	1.7 km	MPC · JPL
290572	2005 UP_{124}	—	October 24, 2005	Kitt Peak	Spacewatch	·	1.2 km	MPC · JPL
290573	2005 UG_{127}	—	October 24, 2005	Kitt Peak	Spacewatch	·	3.0 km	MPC · JPL
290574	2005 UN_{128}	—	October 24, 2005	Kitt Peak	Spacewatch	·	1.4 km	MPC · JPL
290575	2005 UO_{128}	—	October 24, 2005	Kitt Peak	Spacewatch	·	1.6 km	MPC · JPL
290576	2005 UP_{136}	—	October 25, 2005	Mount Lemmon	Mount Lemmon Survey	·	2.1 km	MPC · JPL
290577	2005 UB_{137}	—	October 25, 2005	Mount Lemmon	Mount Lemmon Survey	·	1.3 km	MPC · JPL
290578	2005 UP_{138}	—	October 25, 2005	Kitt Peak	Spacewatch	·	2.3 km	MPC · JPL
290579	2005 UF_{148}	—	October 26, 2005	Kitt Peak	Spacewatch	·	2.1 km	MPC · JPL
290580	2005 UY_{149}	—	October 26, 2005	Kitt Peak	Spacewatch	(5)	1.3 km	MPC · JPL
290581	2005 UZ_{152}	—	October 26, 2005	Kitt Peak	Spacewatch	NYS	1.3 km	MPC · JPL
290582	2005 UA_{153}	—	October 26, 2005	Kitt Peak	Spacewatch	·	2.4 km	MPC · JPL
290583	2005 UK_{153}	—	October 26, 2005	Kitt Peak	Spacewatch	CLO	2.6 km	MPC · JPL
290584	2005 UW_{153}	—	October 26, 2005	Kitt Peak	Spacewatch	·	940 m	MPC · JPL
290585	2005 UL_{155}	—	October 26, 2005	Palomar	NEAT	·	1.3 km	MPC · JPL
290586	2005 UU_{155}	—	October 26, 2005	Anderson Mesa	LONEOS	·	3.6 km	MPC · JPL
290587	2005 UC_{156}	—	October 26, 2005	Palomar	NEAT	·	3.6 km	MPC · JPL
290588	2005 US_{157}	—	October 27, 2005	Catalina	CSS	EOS	2.8 km	MPC · JPL
290589	2005 UU_{157}	—	October 27, 2005	Bergisch Gladbach	W. Bickel	·	2.2 km	MPC · JPL
290590	2005 UE_{163}	—	October 23, 2005	Kitt Peak	Spacewatch	·	720 m	MPC · JPL
290591	2005 UC_{165}	—	October 24, 2005	Kitt Peak	Spacewatch	AGN	1.1 km	MPC · JPL
290592	2005 UC_{167}	—	October 24, 2005	Kitt Peak	Spacewatch	·	1.4 km	MPC · JPL
290593	2005 UC_{172}	—	October 24, 2005	Kitt Peak	Spacewatch	·	1.8 km	MPC · JPL
290594	2005 UK_{172}	—	October 24, 2005	Kitt Peak	Spacewatch	NYS	1.0 km	MPC · JPL
290595	2005 UD_{177}	—	October 24, 2005	Kitt Peak	Spacewatch	·	1.1 km	MPC · JPL
290596	2005 UW_{177}	—	October 24, 2005	Kitt Peak	Spacewatch	·	2.2 km	MPC · JPL
290597	2005 UC_{179}	—	October 24, 2005	Kitt Peak	Spacewatch	·	2.9 km	MPC · JPL
290598	2005 UK_{179}	—	October 24, 2005	Kitt Peak	Spacewatch	·	870 m	MPC · JPL
290599	2005 UP_{181}	—	October 24, 2005	Kitt Peak	Spacewatch	·	3.0 km	MPC · JPL
290600	2005 UR_{191}	—	October 27, 2005	Mount Lemmon	Mount Lemmon Survey	AGN	1.4 km	MPC · JPL

== 290601–290700 ==
back to top

Designation			Discovery			Properties		Ref
Permanent	Provisional	Named after	Date	Site	Discoverer(s)	Category	Diam.	Ref
290601	2005 UL_{193}	—	October 22, 2005	Kitt Peak	Spacewatch	(12739)	1.9 km	MPC · JPL
290602	2005 UT_{194}	—	October 22, 2005	Kitt Peak	Spacewatch	PHO	1.7 km	MPC · JPL
290603	2005 UC_{195}	—	October 22, 2005	Kitt Peak	Spacewatch	·	1.3 km	MPC · JPL
290604	2005 UB_{197}	—	October 24, 2005	Kitt Peak	Spacewatch	·	4.5 km	MPC · JPL
290605	2005 UY_{198}	—	October 25, 2005	Kitt Peak	Spacewatch	·	1.9 km	MPC · JPL
290606	2005 UP_{199}	—	October 25, 2005	Kitt Peak	Spacewatch	·	1.9 km	MPC · JPL
290607	2005 UX_{201}	—	October 25, 2005	Kitt Peak	Spacewatch	·	2.0 km	MPC · JPL
290608	2005 UJ_{205}	—	October 26, 2005	Kitt Peak	Spacewatch	·	1.8 km	MPC · JPL
290609	2005 UW_{206}	—	October 12, 2005	Kitt Peak	Spacewatch	HOF	2.7 km	MPC · JPL
290610	2005 UE_{211}	—	October 27, 2005	Kitt Peak	Spacewatch	·	1.6 km	MPC · JPL
290611	2005 US_{215}	—	October 25, 2005	Kitt Peak	Spacewatch	WIT	1.6 km	MPC · JPL
290612	2005 UV_{216}	—	October 26, 2005	Kitt Peak	Spacewatch	·	6.4 km	MPC · JPL
290613	2005 UB_{218}	—	October 24, 2005	Kitt Peak	Spacewatch	·	1.8 km	MPC · JPL
290614	2005 UH_{220}	—	October 25, 2005	Kitt Peak	Spacewatch	VER	4.4 km	MPC · JPL
290615	2005 UJ_{222}	—	October 25, 2005	Kitt Peak	Spacewatch	·	2.7 km	MPC · JPL
290616	2005 UO_{222}	—	October 25, 2005	Kitt Peak	Spacewatch	PAD	1.8 km	MPC · JPL
290617	2005 UK_{223}	—	October 25, 2005	Kitt Peak	Spacewatch	·	4.6 km	MPC · JPL
290618	2005 UB_{226}	—	October 25, 2005	Kitt Peak	Spacewatch	KOR	1.7 km	MPC · JPL
290619	2005 UP_{226}	—	October 25, 2005	Kitt Peak	Spacewatch	KOR	1.3 km	MPC · JPL
290620	2005 UB_{228}	—	October 25, 2005	Kitt Peak	Spacewatch	·	3.8 km	MPC · JPL
290621	2005 UW_{229}	—	October 25, 2005	Kitt Peak	Spacewatch	·	1.6 km	MPC · JPL
290622	2005 UC_{230}	—	October 25, 2005	Kitt Peak	Spacewatch	NYS	1.5 km	MPC · JPL
290623	2005 US_{232}	—	October 25, 2005	Mount Lemmon	Mount Lemmon Survey	·	2.8 km	MPC · JPL
290624	2005 UE_{234}	—	October 25, 2005	Kitt Peak	Spacewatch	·	720 m	MPC · JPL
290625	2005 US_{234}	—	October 25, 2005	Kitt Peak	Spacewatch	·	1.7 km	MPC · JPL
290626	2005 UD_{239}	—	October 25, 2005	Kitt Peak	Spacewatch	·	1.6 km	MPC · JPL
290627	2005 UL_{240}	—	October 25, 2005	Kitt Peak	Spacewatch	HOF	2.6 km	MPC · JPL
290628	2005 UB_{241}	—	October 25, 2005	Kitt Peak	Spacewatch	AEO	1.3 km	MPC · JPL
290629	2005 UY_{241}	—	October 25, 2005	Kitt Peak	Spacewatch	·	1.3 km	MPC · JPL
290630	2005 UK_{242}	—	October 25, 2005	Kitt Peak	Spacewatch	·	2.1 km	MPC · JPL
290631	2005 UO_{243}	—	October 25, 2005	Kitt Peak	Spacewatch	·	3.5 km	MPC · JPL
290632	2005 UA_{246}	—	October 27, 2005	Mount Lemmon	Mount Lemmon Survey	·	4.1 km	MPC · JPL
290633	2005 UM_{246}	—	October 27, 2005	Kitt Peak	Spacewatch	·	620 m	MPC · JPL
290634	2005 UH_{249}	—	October 28, 2005	Mount Lemmon	Mount Lemmon Survey	AST	1.8 km	MPC · JPL
290635	2005 UQ_{250}	—	October 23, 2005	Catalina	CSS	·	2.4 km	MPC · JPL
290636	2005 UW_{250}	—	October 23, 2005	Catalina	CSS	EOS	2.8 km	MPC · JPL
290637	2005 UH_{251}	—	October 23, 2005	Catalina	CSS	EOS	2.7 km	MPC · JPL
290638	2005 UJ_{252}	—	October 26, 2005	Anderson Mesa	LONEOS	·	4.6 km	MPC · JPL
290639	2005 UB_{257}	—	October 25, 2005	Kitt Peak	Spacewatch	·	3.0 km	MPC · JPL
290640	2005 UY_{258}	—	October 25, 2005	Kitt Peak	Spacewatch	(159)	2.9 km	MPC · JPL
290641	2005 UZ_{259}	—	October 25, 2005	Kitt Peak	Spacewatch	KOR	1.5 km	MPC · JPL
290642	2005 UG_{263}	—	October 27, 2005	Kitt Peak	Spacewatch	·	1.7 km	MPC · JPL
290643	2005 UJ_{264}	—	October 27, 2005	Kitt Peak	Spacewatch	·	2.0 km	MPC · JPL
290644	2005 UZ_{266}	—	October 27, 2005	Kitt Peak	Spacewatch	·	3.6 km	MPC · JPL
290645	2005 UH_{269}	—	October 1, 2005	Mount Lemmon	Mount Lemmon Survey	AST	1.8 km	MPC · JPL
290646	2005 UZ_{275}	—	October 24, 2005	Kitt Peak	Spacewatch	·	1.9 km	MPC · JPL
290647	2005 UY_{277}	—	October 24, 2005	Kitt Peak	Spacewatch	·	2.0 km	MPC · JPL
290648	2005 UQ_{279}	—	October 24, 2005	Kitt Peak	Spacewatch	·	1.9 km	MPC · JPL
290649	2005 UV_{279}	—	October 24, 2005	Kitt Peak	Spacewatch	·	1.9 km	MPC · JPL
290650	2005 UF_{280}	—	October 24, 2005	Kitt Peak	Spacewatch	·	2.4 km	MPC · JPL
290651	2005 UB_{284}	—	October 26, 2005	Kitt Peak	Spacewatch	·	3.7 km	MPC · JPL
290652	2005 UM_{284}	—	October 26, 2005	Kitt Peak	Spacewatch	·	2.3 km	MPC · JPL
290653	2005 UG_{286}	—	October 26, 2005	Kitt Peak	Spacewatch	·	1.7 km	MPC · JPL
290654	2005 UQ_{286}	—	October 26, 2005	Kitt Peak	Spacewatch	NYS	1.3 km	MPC · JPL
290655	2005 UN_{287}	—	October 26, 2005	Kitt Peak	Spacewatch	·	1.0 km	MPC · JPL
290656	2005 UA_{293}	—	October 26, 2005	Kitt Peak	Spacewatch	·	1.0 km	MPC · JPL
290657	2005 UZ_{293}	—	October 26, 2005	Kitt Peak	Spacewatch	·	2.5 km	MPC · JPL
290658	2005 UV_{294}	—	October 26, 2005	Kitt Peak	Spacewatch	·	1.7 km	MPC · JPL
290659	2005 UJ_{295}	—	October 26, 2005	Kitt Peak	Spacewatch	·	1.3 km	MPC · JPL
290660	2005 UY_{297}	—	October 26, 2005	Kitt Peak	Spacewatch	VER	4.0 km	MPC · JPL
290661	2005 UD_{299}	—	October 26, 2005	Kitt Peak	Spacewatch	THM	1.9 km	MPC · JPL
290662	2005 UB_{300}	—	October 26, 2005	Kitt Peak	Spacewatch	·	2.1 km	MPC · JPL
290663	2005 UV_{300}	—	October 26, 2005	Kitt Peak	Spacewatch	·	3.2 km	MPC · JPL
290664	2005 UM_{305}	—	October 27, 2005	Kitt Peak	Spacewatch	·	1.0 km	MPC · JPL
290665	2005 UO_{308}	—	October 27, 2005	Mount Lemmon	Mount Lemmon Survey	MAS	770 m	MPC · JPL
290666	2005 UY_{310}	—	October 29, 2005	Mount Lemmon	Mount Lemmon Survey	MRX	1.1 km	MPC · JPL
290667	2005 UN_{312}	—	October 29, 2005	Mount Lemmon	Mount Lemmon Survey	THM	2.3 km	MPC · JPL
290668	2005 UQ_{312}	—	October 29, 2005	Catalina	CSS	MAS	840 m	MPC · JPL
290669	2005 UV_{314}	—	October 29, 2005	Catalina	CSS	·	2.7 km	MPC · JPL
290670	2005 UN_{317}	—	October 27, 2005	Mount Lemmon	Mount Lemmon Survey	·	2.6 km	MPC · JPL
290671	2005 UX_{320}	—	October 27, 2005	Kitt Peak	Spacewatch	WIT	1.3 km	MPC · JPL
290672	2005 UR_{321}	—	October 27, 2005	Kitt Peak	Spacewatch	(21885)	5.5 km	MPC · JPL
290673	2005 UU_{325}	—	October 29, 2005	Mount Lemmon	Mount Lemmon Survey	·	1.3 km	MPC · JPL
290674	2005 UV_{337}	—	October 31, 2005	Kitt Peak	Spacewatch	THM	2.6 km	MPC · JPL
290675	2005 UL_{338}	—	October 31, 2005	Kitt Peak	Spacewatch	KOR	1.3 km	MPC · JPL
290676	2005 UO_{338}	—	October 31, 2005	Kitt Peak	Spacewatch	·	1.7 km	MPC · JPL
290677	2005 UV_{341}	—	October 31, 2005	Mount Lemmon	Mount Lemmon Survey	·	1.2 km	MPC · JPL
290678	2005 UT_{342}	—	October 29, 2005	Kitt Peak	Spacewatch	·	2.4 km	MPC · JPL
290679	2005 UY_{342}	—	October 30, 2005	Palomar	NEAT	·	2.8 km	MPC · JPL
290680	2005 UV_{347}	—	October 31, 2005	Kitt Peak	Spacewatch	·	2.4 km	MPC · JPL
290681	2005 UM_{350}	—	October 28, 2005	Catalina	CSS	·	3.3 km	MPC · JPL
290682	2005 UK_{351}	—	October 29, 2005	Catalina	CSS	·	2.3 km	MPC · JPL
290683	2005 UZ_{351}	—	October 29, 2005	Catalina	CSS	·	5.0 km	MPC · JPL
290684	2005 US_{354}	—	October 29, 2005	Catalina	CSS	EOS	2.8 km	MPC · JPL
290685	2005 UT_{354}	—	October 29, 2005	Socorro	LINEAR	TIR	4.2 km	MPC · JPL
290686	2005 UW_{354}	—	October 29, 2005	Catalina	CSS	·	4.2 km	MPC · JPL
290687	2005 UY_{360}	—	October 27, 2005	Kitt Peak	Spacewatch	·	2.5 km	MPC · JPL
290688	2005 UX_{361}	—	October 27, 2005	Kitt Peak	Spacewatch	·	1.8 km	MPC · JPL
290689	2005 UY_{363}	—	October 27, 2005	Kitt Peak	Spacewatch	·	2.7 km	MPC · JPL
290690	2005 UK_{365}	—	October 27, 2005	Kitt Peak	Spacewatch	·	1.5 km	MPC · JPL
290691	2005 UX_{367}	—	October 27, 2005	Kitt Peak	Spacewatch	HOF	3.7 km	MPC · JPL
290692	2005 UN_{368}	—	October 27, 2005	Kitt Peak	Spacewatch	·	2.0 km	MPC · JPL
290693	2005 UW_{370}	—	October 27, 2005	Kitt Peak	Spacewatch	PAD	2.0 km	MPC · JPL
290694	2005 UC_{371}	—	October 27, 2005	Mount Lemmon	Mount Lemmon Survey	·	1.3 km	MPC · JPL
290695	2005 UO_{371}	—	October 27, 2005	Mount Lemmon	Mount Lemmon Survey	·	660 m	MPC · JPL
290696	2005 UA_{373}	—	October 27, 2005	Kitt Peak	Spacewatch	·	2.1 km	MPC · JPL
290697	2005 UJ_{373}	—	October 27, 2005	Kitt Peak	Spacewatch	·	2.3 km	MPC · JPL
290698	2005 UH_{374}	—	October 27, 2005	Kitt Peak	Spacewatch	·	1.8 km	MPC · JPL
290699	2005 UK_{379}	—	October 29, 2005	Mount Lemmon	Mount Lemmon Survey	HYG	2.9 km	MPC · JPL
290700	2005 UR_{382}	—	October 27, 2005	Socorro	LINEAR	·	820 m	MPC · JPL

== 290701–290800 ==
back to top

Designation			Discovery			Properties		Ref
Permanent	Provisional	Named after	Date	Site	Discoverer(s)	Category	Diam.	Ref
290701	2005 UF_{385}	—	October 27, 2005	Kitt Peak	Spacewatch	·	1.7 km	MPC · JPL
290702	2005 UP_{387}	—	October 30, 2005	Mount Lemmon	Mount Lemmon Survey	ANF	1.6 km	MPC · JPL
290703	2005 UU_{389}	—	October 29, 2005	Mount Lemmon	Mount Lemmon Survey	·	830 m	MPC · JPL
290704	2005 UA_{392}	—	October 30, 2005	Kitt Peak	Spacewatch	·	660 m	MPC · JPL
290705	2005 UB_{392}	—	October 30, 2005	Kitt Peak	Spacewatch	KOR	1.3 km	MPC · JPL
290706	2005 UK_{393}	—	October 27, 2005	Anderson Mesa	LONEOS	·	4.4 km	MPC · JPL
290707	2005 UH_{402}	—	October 28, 2005	Kitt Peak	Spacewatch	·	4.1 km	MPC · JPL
290708	2005 UY_{403}	—	October 29, 2005	Kitt Peak	Spacewatch	V	720 m	MPC · JPL
290709	2005 UM_{407}	—	October 30, 2005	Mount Lemmon	Mount Lemmon Survey	KOR	1.2 km	MPC · JPL
290710	2005 UP_{412}	—	October 31, 2005	Mount Lemmon	Mount Lemmon Survey	·	2.1 km	MPC · JPL
290711	2005 UP_{413}	—	October 25, 2005	Kitt Peak	Spacewatch	WIT	950 m	MPC · JPL
290712	2005 UC_{414}	—	October 25, 2005	Kitt Peak	Spacewatch	SYL · CYB	7.0 km	MPC · JPL
290713	2005 UM_{414}	—	October 25, 2005	Kitt Peak	Spacewatch	·	2.6 km	MPC · JPL
290714	2005 UN_{414}	—	October 25, 2005	Kitt Peak	Spacewatch	·	1.2 km	MPC · JPL
290715	2005 UO_{417}	—	October 25, 2005	Kitt Peak	Spacewatch	·	2.5 km	MPC · JPL
290716	2005 UL_{422}	—	October 27, 2005	Mount Lemmon	Mount Lemmon Survey	·	790 m	MPC · JPL
290717	2005 UA_{424}	—	October 28, 2005	Kitt Peak	Spacewatch	·	560 m	MPC · JPL
290718	2005 UJ_{427}	—	October 28, 2005	Kitt Peak	Spacewatch	·	3.6 km	MPC · JPL
290719	2005 UL_{427}	—	October 28, 2005	Kitt Peak	Spacewatch	·	2.9 km	MPC · JPL
290720	2005 UR_{429}	—	October 28, 2005	Kitt Peak	Spacewatch	·	690 m	MPC · JPL
290721	2005 UE_{430}	—	October 28, 2005	Kitt Peak	Spacewatch	CLA	1.6 km	MPC · JPL
290722	2005 UQ_{430}	—	October 28, 2005	Kitt Peak	Spacewatch	·	4.4 km	MPC · JPL
290723	2005 UZ_{437}	—	October 27, 2005	Mount Lemmon	Mount Lemmon Survey	·	2.6 km	MPC · JPL
290724	2005 UC_{443}	—	October 30, 2005	Socorro	LINEAR	·	4.6 km	MPC · JPL
290725	2005 UG_{443}	—	October 30, 2005	Socorro	LINEAR	·	6.0 km	MPC · JPL
290726	2005 UM_{443}	—	October 30, 2005	Socorro	LINEAR	·	3.2 km	MPC · JPL
290727	2005 UO_{443}	—	October 30, 2005	Socorro	LINEAR	·	1.5 km	MPC · JPL
290728	2005 UY_{443}	—	October 30, 2005	Socorro	LINEAR	·	1.2 km	MPC · JPL
290729	2005 US_{444}	—	October 30, 2005	Mount Lemmon	Mount Lemmon Survey	·	1.0 km	MPC · JPL
290730	2005 UL_{445}	—	October 31, 2005	Kitt Peak	Spacewatch	EOS	2.4 km	MPC · JPL
290731	2005 UV_{446}	—	October 29, 2005	Catalina	CSS	·	3.1 km	MPC · JPL
290732	2005 UH_{447}	—	October 29, 2005	Catalina	CSS	V	840 m	MPC · JPL
290733	2005 UJ_{447}	—	October 29, 2005	Catalina	CSS	·	4.8 km	MPC · JPL
290734	2005 UN_{448}	—	October 30, 2005	Socorro	LINEAR	·	1.2 km	MPC · JPL
290735	2005 UG_{453}	—	October 29, 2005	Kitt Peak	Spacewatch	HYG	3.3 km	MPC · JPL
290736	2005 UM_{456}	—	October 30, 2005	Mount Lemmon	Mount Lemmon Survey	·	3.2 km	MPC · JPL
290737	2005 UH_{457}	—	October 31, 2005	Mount Lemmon	Mount Lemmon Survey	·	4.0 km	MPC · JPL
290738	2005 UM_{457}	—	October 31, 2005	Palomar	NEAT	·	2.8 km	MPC · JPL
290739	2005 UD_{462}	—	October 30, 2005	Kitt Peak	Spacewatch	KOR	1.8 km	MPC · JPL
290740	2005 UZ_{465}	—	October 30, 2005	Kitt Peak	Spacewatch	·	2.0 km	MPC · JPL
290741	2005 UZ_{466}	—	October 30, 2005	Kitt Peak	Spacewatch	·	2.1 km	MPC · JPL
290742	2005 UF_{470}	—	October 30, 2005	Kitt Peak	Spacewatch	HIL · 3:2	7.5 km	MPC · JPL
290743	2005 UK_{470}	—	October 30, 2005	Kitt Peak	Spacewatch	·	1.3 km	MPC · JPL
290744	2005 UU_{470}	—	October 30, 2005	Kitt Peak	Spacewatch	·	2.1 km	MPC · JPL
290745	2005 UV_{472}	—	October 30, 2005	Mount Lemmon	Mount Lemmon Survey	·	1.7 km	MPC · JPL
290746	2005 UB_{473}	—	October 30, 2005	Mount Lemmon	Mount Lemmon Survey	HOF	2.8 km	MPC · JPL
290747	2005 UP_{479}	—	October 30, 2005	Mount Lemmon	Mount Lemmon Survey	3:2	6.1 km	MPC · JPL
290748	2005 UY_{479}	—	October 30, 2005	Catalina	CSS	PHO	1.2 km	MPC · JPL
290749	2005 UO_{485}	—	October 22, 2005	Catalina	CSS	·	2.3 km	MPC · JPL
290750	2005 UC_{487}	—	October 23, 2005	Catalina	CSS	·	5.6 km	MPC · JPL
290751	2005 UC_{488}	—	October 23, 2005	Catalina	CSS	·	3.9 km	MPC · JPL
290752	2005 UV_{492}	—	October 25, 2005	Catalina	CSS	·	1.8 km	MPC · JPL
290753	2005 UY_{493}	—	October 25, 2005	Catalina	CSS	EOS	2.9 km	MPC · JPL
290754	2005 UH_{494}	—	October 25, 2005	Catalina	CSS	NYS	1.3 km	MPC · JPL
290755	2005 US_{494}	—	October 25, 2005	Catalina	CSS	·	3.6 km	MPC · JPL
290756	2005 UA_{498}	—	October 27, 2005	Anderson Mesa	LONEOS	HYG	2.9 km	MPC · JPL
290757	2005 UE_{500}	—	October 27, 2005	Palomar	NEAT	·	3.1 km	MPC · JPL
290758	2005 UH_{502}	—	October 29, 2005	Palomar	NEAT	JUN	1.6 km	MPC · JPL
290759	2005 UR_{505}	—	October 24, 2005	Mauna Kea	D. J. Tholen	V	820 m	MPC · JPL
290760	2005 UC_{509}	—	October 25, 2005	Mount Lemmon	Mount Lemmon Survey	·	870 m	MPC · JPL
290761	2005 UW_{510}	—	October 26, 2005	Kitt Peak	Spacewatch	·	730 m	MPC · JPL
290762	2005 US_{511}	—	October 28, 2005	Kitt Peak	Spacewatch	·	1.1 km	MPC · JPL
290763	2005 UP_{512}	—	October 30, 2005	Mount Lemmon	Mount Lemmon Survey	·	1.3 km	MPC · JPL
290764	2005 UL_{513}	—	October 25, 2005	Mount Lemmon	Mount Lemmon Survey	·	2.2 km	MPC · JPL
290765	2005 UB_{514}	—	October 29, 2005	Kitt Peak	Spacewatch	·	1.7 km	MPC · JPL
290766	2005 UH_{514}	—	October 20, 2005	Apache Point	A. C. Becker	NYS	1.5 km	MPC · JPL
290767	2005 UJ_{514}	—	October 20, 2005	Apache Point	A. C. Becker	·	1.8 km	MPC · JPL
290768	2005 UR_{515}	—	October 22, 2005	Apache Point	A. C. Becker	ELF	3.9 km	MPC · JPL
290769	2005 UQ_{517}	—	October 25, 2005	Apache Point	A. C. Becker	·	3.1 km	MPC · JPL
290770	2005 UG_{523}	—	October 27, 2005	Apache Point	A. C. Becker	·	2.8 km	MPC · JPL
290771	2005 UY_{526}	—	October 25, 2005	Mount Lemmon	Mount Lemmon Survey	AST	1.7 km	MPC · JPL
290772	2005 VC	—	November 1, 2005	Mount Lemmon	Mount Lemmon Survey	APO +1km · PHA	1.1 km	MPC · JPL
290773	2005 VL_{3}	—	November 6, 2005	Ottmarsheim	C. Rinner	GEF	1.9 km	MPC · JPL
290774	2005 VM_{4}	—	November 6, 2005	Ottmarsheim	C. Rinner	·	1.1 km	MPC · JPL
290775	2005 VT_{11}	—	November 3, 2005	Socorro	LINEAR	·	960 m	MPC · JPL
290776	2005 VV_{14}	—	November 3, 2005	Mount Lemmon	Mount Lemmon Survey	·	2.9 km	MPC · JPL
290777	2005 VX_{26}	—	November 3, 2005	Mount Lemmon	Mount Lemmon Survey	EOS	2.1 km	MPC · JPL
290778	2005 VP_{28}	—	November 4, 2005	Catalina	CSS	·	2.2 km	MPC · JPL
290779	2005 VB_{32}	—	November 4, 2005	Kitt Peak	Spacewatch	·	4.6 km	MPC · JPL
290780	2005 VR_{33}	—	November 2, 2005	Mount Lemmon	Mount Lemmon Survey	·	3.8 km	MPC · JPL
290781	2005 VC_{38}	—	November 3, 2005	Mount Lemmon	Mount Lemmon Survey	·	2.1 km	MPC · JPL
290782	2005 VU_{39}	—	November 4, 2005	Catalina	CSS	·	4.9 km	MPC · JPL
290783	2005 VW_{39}	—	November 4, 2005	Catalina	CSS	TEL	2.1 km	MPC · JPL
290784	2005 VU_{40}	—	November 4, 2005	Mount Lemmon	Mount Lemmon Survey	·	2.0 km	MPC · JPL
290785	2005 VD_{43}	—	November 5, 2005	Mount Lemmon	Mount Lemmon Survey	EOS	2.4 km	MPC · JPL
290786	2005 VA_{44}	—	November 3, 2005	Kitt Peak	Spacewatch	·	3.2 km	MPC · JPL
290787	2005 VH_{46}	—	November 4, 2005	Mount Lemmon	Mount Lemmon Survey	·	2.1 km	MPC · JPL
290788	2005 VR_{50}	—	November 3, 2005	Catalina	CSS	·	5.5 km	MPC · JPL
290789	2005 VU_{50}	—	November 3, 2005	Catalina	CSS	EOS	2.5 km	MPC · JPL
290790	2005 VE_{61}	—	November 5, 2005	Catalina	CSS	fast	2.9 km	MPC · JPL
290791	2005 VT_{62}	—	November 1, 2005	Mount Lemmon	Mount Lemmon Survey	NYS	1.1 km	MPC · JPL
290792	2005 VA_{67}	—	November 1, 2005	Mount Lemmon	Mount Lemmon Survey	·	2.4 km	MPC · JPL
290793	2005 VV_{69}	—	November 1, 2005	Mount Lemmon	Mount Lemmon Survey	·	1.7 km	MPC · JPL
290794	2005 VX_{70}	—	November 1, 2005	Mount Lemmon	Mount Lemmon Survey	AGN	1.3 km	MPC · JPL
290795	2005 VC_{72}	—	November 1, 2005	Mount Lemmon	Mount Lemmon Survey	·	1.4 km	MPC · JPL
290796	2005 VP_{74}	—	November 1, 2005	Mount Lemmon	Mount Lemmon Survey	·	1.0 km	MPC · JPL
290797	2005 VO_{75}	—	November 1, 2005	Mount Lemmon	Mount Lemmon Survey	NYS	1.2 km	MPC · JPL
290798	2005 VR_{78}	—	November 6, 2005	Anderson Mesa	LONEOS	·	5.4 km	MPC · JPL
290799	2005 VP_{79}	—	November 3, 2005	Socorro	LINEAR	·	3.6 km	MPC · JPL
290800	2005 VE_{83}	—	November 3, 2005	Mount Lemmon	Mount Lemmon Survey	WIT	1.3 km	MPC · JPL

== 290801–290900 ==
back to top

Designation			Discovery			Properties		Ref
Permanent	Provisional	Named after	Date	Site	Discoverer(s)	Category	Diam.	Ref
290801	2005 VN_{87}	—	November 6, 2005	Kitt Peak	Spacewatch	·	710 m	MPC · JPL
290802	2005 VA_{89}	—	November 6, 2005	Kitt Peak	Spacewatch	·	1.7 km	MPC · JPL
290803	2005 VB_{89}	—	November 6, 2005	Kitt Peak	Spacewatch	·	1.1 km	MPC · JPL
290804	2005 VM_{90}	—	November 6, 2005	Kitt Peak	Spacewatch	EOS	2.8 km	MPC · JPL
290805	2005 VR_{93}	—	November 6, 2005	Mount Lemmon	Mount Lemmon Survey	·	3.3 km	MPC · JPL
290806	2005 VX_{93}	—	November 6, 2005	Catalina	CSS	·	1.6 km	MPC · JPL
290807	2005 VY_{93}	—	November 6, 2005	Catalina	CSS	·	4.5 km	MPC · JPL
290808	2005 VZ_{93}	—	November 6, 2005	Catalina	CSS	AGN	1.5 km	MPC · JPL
290809	2005 VG_{96}	—	November 7, 2005	Socorro	LINEAR	EOS	2.3 km	MPC · JPL
290810	2005 VW_{98}	—	November 10, 2005	Catalina	CSS	·	3.0 km	MPC · JPL
290811	2005 VR_{101}	—	November 2, 2005	Mount Lemmon	Mount Lemmon Survey	·	900 m	MPC · JPL
290812	2005 VN_{102}	—	November 1, 2005	Kitt Peak	Spacewatch	·	2.7 km	MPC · JPL
290813	2005 VR_{102}	—	November 2, 2005	Catalina	CSS	·	3.1 km	MPC · JPL
290814	2005 VA_{107}	—	November 5, 2005	Mount Lemmon	Mount Lemmon Survey	V	780 m	MPC · JPL
290815	2005 VR_{109}	—	November 6, 2005	Mount Lemmon	Mount Lemmon Survey	·	1.2 km	MPC · JPL
290816	2005 VL_{111}	—	November 6, 2005	Mount Lemmon	Mount Lemmon Survey	(2076)	1.4 km	MPC · JPL
290817	2005 VE_{112}	—	November 6, 2005	Mount Lemmon	Mount Lemmon Survey	·	1.5 km	MPC · JPL
290818	2005 VK_{114}	—	November 10, 2005	Mount Lemmon	Mount Lemmon Survey	·	1.5 km	MPC · JPL
290819	2005 VP_{115}	—	November 11, 2005	Kitt Peak	Spacewatch	HOF	3.6 km	MPC · JPL
290820	2005 VY_{116}	—	November 11, 2005	Socorro	LINEAR	·	4.6 km	MPC · JPL
290821	2005 VA_{124}	—	November 1, 2005	Mount Lemmon	Mount Lemmon Survey	·	4.0 km	MPC · JPL
290822	2005 VA_{126}	—	November 1, 2005	Apache Point	A. C. Becker	·	1.4 km	MPC · JPL
290823	2005 VY_{127}	—	November 1, 2005	Apache Point	A. C. Becker	NYS	1.4 km	MPC · JPL
290824	2005 VU_{128}	—	November 1, 2005	Apache Point	A. C. Becker	HOF	2.6 km	MPC · JPL
290825	2005 VC_{129}	—	November 1, 2005	Apache Point	A. C. Becker	·	1.6 km	MPC · JPL
290826	2005 VF_{129}	—	November 1, 2005	Apache Point	A. C. Becker	·	1.8 km	MPC · JPL
290827	2005 VU_{131}	—	November 1, 2005	Apache Point	A. C. Becker	EOS	1.9 km	MPC · JPL
290828	2005 VX_{132}	—	November 1, 2005	Apache Point	A. C. Becker	VER	2.3 km	MPC · JPL
290829	2005 VH_{133}	—	November 1, 2005	Apache Point	A. C. Becker	EOS	1.7 km	MPC · JPL
290830	2005 VC_{135}	—	November 6, 2005	Kitt Peak	Spacewatch	EOS	2.0 km	MPC · JPL
290831	2005 VZ_{135}	—	November 4, 2005	Mount Lemmon	Mount Lemmon Survey	·	2.8 km	MPC · JPL
290832	2005 WJ_{1}	—	November 21, 2005	Socorro	LINEAR	·	5.9 km	MPC · JPL
290833	2005 WH_{2}	—	November 21, 2005	Needville	Eastman, M., Wells, D.	·	2.4 km	MPC · JPL
290834	2005 WW_{5}	—	November 21, 2005	Anderson Mesa	LONEOS	·	3.0 km	MPC · JPL
290835	2005 WY_{7}	—	November 21, 2005	Catalina	CSS	TIR ·	5.0 km	MPC · JPL
290836	2005 WT_{11}	—	November 22, 2005	Kitt Peak	Spacewatch	MAS	780 m	MPC · JPL
290837	2005 WO_{14}	—	November 22, 2005	Kitt Peak	Spacewatch	·	2.4 km	MPC · JPL
290838	2005 WD_{17}	—	November 22, 2005	Kitt Peak	Spacewatch	·	2.3 km	MPC · JPL
290839	2005 WR_{17}	—	November 22, 2005	Kitt Peak	Spacewatch	·	1.1 km	MPC · JPL
290840	2005 WF_{19}	—	November 24, 2005	Palomar	NEAT	·	1.4 km	MPC · JPL
290841	2005 WL_{24}	—	November 21, 2005	Kitt Peak	Spacewatch	·	1.5 km	MPC · JPL
290842	2005 WJ_{25}	—	November 21, 2005	Kitt Peak	Spacewatch	·	1.6 km	MPC · JPL
290843	2005 WX_{27}	—	November 21, 2005	Kitt Peak	Spacewatch	·	3.1 km	MPC · JPL
290844	2005 WR_{29}	—	November 21, 2005	Kitt Peak	Spacewatch	·	4.6 km	MPC · JPL
290845	2005 WJ_{30}	—	November 21, 2005	Kitt Peak	Spacewatch	·	2.0 km	MPC · JPL
290846	2005 WD_{31}	—	November 21, 2005	Kitt Peak	Spacewatch	HOF	3.2 km	MPC · JPL
290847	2005 WE_{31}	—	November 21, 2005	Kitt Peak	Spacewatch	·	600 m	MPC · JPL
290848	2005 WM_{32}	—	November 21, 2005	Kitt Peak	Spacewatch	·	2.2 km	MPC · JPL
290849	2005 WP_{32}	—	November 21, 2005	Kitt Peak	Spacewatch	KOR	1.6 km	MPC · JPL
290850	2005 WB_{33}	—	November 21, 2005	Kitt Peak	Spacewatch	INA	4.5 km	MPC · JPL
290851	2005 WE_{33}	—	November 21, 2005	Catalina	CSS	·	2.9 km	MPC · JPL
290852	2005 WZ_{33}	—	November 21, 2005	Kitt Peak	Spacewatch	·	1.8 km	MPC · JPL
290853	2005 WP_{35}	—	November 22, 2005	Kitt Peak	Spacewatch	V	870 m	MPC · JPL
290854	2005 WS_{37}	—	November 22, 2005	Kitt Peak	Spacewatch	·	2.0 km	MPC · JPL
290855	2005 WE_{41}	—	November 21, 2005	Kitt Peak	Spacewatch	THM	3.7 km	MPC · JPL
290856	2005 WB_{42}	—	November 21, 2005	Kitt Peak	Spacewatch	·	2.4 km	MPC · JPL
290857	2005 WM_{43}	—	November 21, 2005	Kitt Peak	Spacewatch	·	2.6 km	MPC · JPL
290858	2005 WW_{44}	—	November 22, 2005	Kitt Peak	Spacewatch	·	2.6 km	MPC · JPL
290859	2005 WG_{45}	—	November 22, 2005	Kitt Peak	Spacewatch	AGN	1.5 km	MPC · JPL
290860	2005 WM_{47}	—	November 25, 2005	Kitt Peak	Spacewatch	·	2.4 km	MPC · JPL
290861	2005 WD_{49}	—	November 25, 2005	Kitt Peak	Spacewatch	·	2.4 km	MPC · JPL
290862	2005 WL_{49}	—	November 25, 2005	Kitt Peak	Spacewatch	KOR	1.6 km	MPC · JPL
290863	2005 WW_{51}	—	November 25, 2005	Mount Lemmon	Mount Lemmon Survey	KOR	1.4 km	MPC · JPL
290864	2005 WK_{52}	—	November 25, 2005	Mount Lemmon	Mount Lemmon Survey	·	820 m	MPC · JPL
290865	2005 WH_{53}	—	November 25, 2005	Kitt Peak	Spacewatch	WIT	1.2 km	MPC · JPL
290866	2005 WL_{55}	—	November 28, 2005	Junk Bond	D. Healy	·	2.3 km	MPC · JPL
290867	2005 WT_{55}	—	November 25, 2005	Kitt Peak	Spacewatch	·	930 m	MPC · JPL
290868	2005 WA_{56}	—	November 25, 2005	Mount Lemmon	Mount Lemmon Survey	·	1.6 km	MPC · JPL
290869	2005 WH_{56}	—	November 26, 2005	Kitami	K. Endate	·	1.2 km	MPC · JPL
290870	2005 WE_{57}	—	November 20, 2005	Gnosca	S. Sposetti	·	1.7 km	MPC · JPL
290871	2005 WJ_{57}	—	November 26, 2005	Cordell-Lorenz	Cordell-Lorenz	3:2	8.8 km	MPC · JPL
290872	2005 WQ_{57}	—	November 20, 2005	Great Shefford	Birtwhistle, P.	·	4.1 km	MPC · JPL
290873	2005 WA_{58}	—	November 30, 2005	Gnosca	S. Sposetti	MAS	840 m	MPC · JPL
290874	2005 WQ_{58}	—	November 26, 2005	Mount Lemmon	Mount Lemmon Survey	EOS	2.7 km	MPC · JPL
290875	2005 WC_{60}	—	November 25, 2005	Catalina	CSS	EOS	2.0 km	MPC · JPL
290876	2005 WH_{60}	—	November 26, 2005	Catalina	CSS	·	2.8 km	MPC · JPL
290877	2005 WN_{66}	—	November 22, 2005	Kitt Peak	Spacewatch	THM	3.0 km	MPC · JPL
290878	2005 WK_{68}	—	November 25, 2005	Mount Lemmon	Mount Lemmon Survey	THM	2.4 km	MPC · JPL
290879	2005 WH_{69}	—	November 26, 2005	Mount Lemmon	Mount Lemmon Survey	·	1.5 km	MPC · JPL
290880	2005 WZ_{71}	—	November 22, 2005	Kitt Peak	Spacewatch	AGN	1.7 km	MPC · JPL
290881	2005 WW_{72}	—	November 25, 2005	Kitt Peak	Spacewatch	NAE	3.5 km	MPC · JPL
290882	2005 WG_{73}	—	November 25, 2005	Catalina	CSS	·	3.9 km	MPC · JPL
290883	2005 WH_{73}	—	November 25, 2005	Kitt Peak	Spacewatch	NYS	1.4 km	MPC · JPL
290884	2005 WK_{75}	—	November 25, 2005	Kitt Peak	Spacewatch	·	840 m	MPC · JPL
290885	2005 WN_{75}	—	November 25, 2005	Kitt Peak	Spacewatch	PAD	1.8 km	MPC · JPL
290886	2005 WD_{76}	—	November 25, 2005	Kitt Peak	Spacewatch	·	2.3 km	MPC · JPL
290887	2005 WA_{78}	—	November 25, 2005	Kitt Peak	Spacewatch	·	4.1 km	MPC · JPL
290888	2005 WG_{80}	—	November 25, 2005	Mount Lemmon	Mount Lemmon Survey	·	2.5 km	MPC · JPL
290889	2005 WA_{82}	—	November 28, 2005	Socorro	LINEAR	·	2.3 km	MPC · JPL
290890	2005 WY_{82}	—	November 25, 2005	Mount Lemmon	Mount Lemmon Survey	·	2.4 km	MPC · JPL
290891	2005 WD_{84}	—	November 26, 2005	Mount Lemmon	Mount Lemmon Survey	·	2.4 km	MPC · JPL
290892	2005 WL_{85}	—	November 28, 2005	Mount Lemmon	Mount Lemmon Survey	·	2.4 km	MPC · JPL
290893	2005 WC_{86}	—	November 28, 2005	Mount Lemmon	Mount Lemmon Survey	·	2.7 km	MPC · JPL
290894	2005 WC_{87}	—	November 28, 2005	Mount Lemmon	Mount Lemmon Survey	·	1.3 km	MPC · JPL
290895	2005 WQ_{87}	—	November 28, 2005	Mount Lemmon	Mount Lemmon Survey	·	2.5 km	MPC · JPL
290896	2005 WV_{87}	—	November 28, 2005	Mount Lemmon	Mount Lemmon Survey	THB	4.2 km	MPC · JPL
290897	2005 WQ_{94}	—	November 26, 2005	Kitt Peak	Spacewatch	(5)	1.6 km	MPC · JPL
290898	2005 WR_{96}	—	November 26, 2005	Kitt Peak	Spacewatch	·	990 m	MPC · JPL
290899	2005 WZ_{96}	—	November 26, 2005	Kitt Peak	Spacewatch	KOR	1.5 km	MPC · JPL
290900	2005 WN_{97}	—	November 26, 2005	Mount Lemmon	Mount Lemmon Survey	NYS	1.1 km	MPC · JPL

== 290901–291000 ==
back to top

Designation			Discovery			Properties		Ref
Permanent	Provisional	Named after	Date	Site	Discoverer(s)	Category	Diam.	Ref
290901	2005 WV_{97}	—	November 26, 2005	Kitt Peak	Spacewatch	·	2.7 km	MPC · JPL
290902	2005 WL_{98}	—	November 28, 2005	Kitt Peak	Spacewatch	THM	2.6 km	MPC · JPL
290903	2005 WA_{99}	—	November 28, 2005	Mount Lemmon	Mount Lemmon Survey	·	2.5 km	MPC · JPL
290904	2005 WU_{99}	—	November 28, 2005	Mount Lemmon	Mount Lemmon Survey	CYB	6.6 km	MPC · JPL
290905	2005 WJ_{100}	—	November 28, 2005	Catalina	CSS	EOS	2.4 km	MPC · JPL
290906	2005 WA_{101}	—	November 29, 2005	Socorro	LINEAR	·	2.3 km	MPC · JPL
290907	2005 WW_{101}	—	November 29, 2005	Socorro	LINEAR	·	1.3 km	MPC · JPL
290908	2005 WY_{102}	—	November 25, 2005	Catalina	CSS	·	1.6 km	MPC · JPL
290909	2005 WE_{104}	—	November 28, 2005	Catalina	CSS	NYS	1.1 km	MPC · JPL
290910	2005 WV_{104}	—	November 28, 2005	Catalina	CSS	CYB	4.6 km	MPC · JPL
290911	2005 WT_{105}	—	November 29, 2005	Catalina	CSS	·	2.7 km	MPC · JPL
290912	2005 WB_{107}	—	November 25, 2005	Mount Lemmon	Mount Lemmon Survey	·	1.5 km	MPC · JPL
290913	2005 WR_{109}	—	November 30, 2005	Kitt Peak	Spacewatch	HYG	3.2 km	MPC · JPL
290914	2005 WY_{113}	—	November 28, 2005	Kitt Peak	Spacewatch	·	1.9 km	MPC · JPL
290915	2005 WB_{114}	—	November 28, 2005	Mount Lemmon	Mount Lemmon Survey	·	5.5 km	MPC · JPL
290916	2005 WN_{114}	—	November 28, 2005	Socorro	LINEAR	·	1.5 km	MPC · JPL
290917	2005 WV_{114}	—	November 28, 2005	Mount Lemmon	Mount Lemmon Survey	·	3.1 km	MPC · JPL
290918	2005 WQ_{117}	—	November 28, 2005	Socorro	LINEAR	·	840 m	MPC · JPL
290919	2005 WZ_{117}	—	November 28, 2005	Socorro	LINEAR	·	1.3 km	MPC · JPL
290920	2005 WQ_{118}	—	November 30, 2005	Eskridge	Farpoint	EOS	2.6 km	MPC · JPL
290921	2005 WU_{118}	—	November 25, 2005	Kitt Peak	Spacewatch	·	830 m	MPC · JPL
290922	2005 WQ_{119}	—	November 28, 2005	Catalina	CSS	MIS	2.6 km	MPC · JPL
290923	2005 WU_{123}	—	November 25, 2005	Mount Lemmon	Mount Lemmon Survey	(17392)	1.4 km	MPC · JPL
290924	2005 WX_{123}	—	November 25, 2005	Mount Lemmon	Mount Lemmon Survey	·	1 km	MPC · JPL
290925	2005 WV_{125}	—	November 25, 2005	Mount Lemmon	Mount Lemmon Survey	THM	2.0 km	MPC · JPL
290926	2005 WT_{127}	—	November 25, 2005	Mount Lemmon	Mount Lemmon Survey	·	1.5 km	MPC · JPL
290927	2005 WO_{130}	—	November 25, 2005	Mount Lemmon	Mount Lemmon Survey	·	1.3 km	MPC · JPL
290928	2005 WC_{131}	—	November 25, 2005	Mount Lemmon	Mount Lemmon Survey	THM	3.0 km	MPC · JPL
290929	2005 WG_{131}	—	November 25, 2005	Mount Lemmon	Mount Lemmon Survey	·	2.0 km	MPC · JPL
290930	2005 WZ_{135}	—	November 26, 2005	Kitt Peak	Spacewatch	·	1.6 km	MPC · JPL
290931	2005 WG_{136}	—	November 26, 2005	Kitt Peak	Spacewatch	·	1.0 km	MPC · JPL
290932	2005 WC_{139}	—	November 26, 2005	Mount Lemmon	Mount Lemmon Survey	·	3.2 km	MPC · JPL
290933	2005 WK_{140}	—	November 26, 2005	Mount Lemmon	Mount Lemmon Survey	·	3.6 km	MPC · JPL
290934	2005 WM_{140}	—	November 26, 2005	Mount Lemmon	Mount Lemmon Survey	T_{j} (2.99) · 3:2	8.1 km	MPC · JPL
290935	2005 WT_{140}	—	November 26, 2005	Mount Lemmon	Mount Lemmon Survey	MAR	1.5 km	MPC · JPL
290936	2005 WQ_{143}	—	November 30, 2005	Kitt Peak	Spacewatch	·	1.3 km	MPC · JPL
290937	2005 WV_{145}	—	November 25, 2005	Kitt Peak	Spacewatch	·	1.6 km	MPC · JPL
290938	2005 WK_{146}	—	November 25, 2005	Kitt Peak	Spacewatch	AEO	1.4 km	MPC · JPL
290939	2005 WN_{149}	—	November 28, 2005	Kitt Peak	Spacewatch	·	810 m	MPC · JPL
290940	2005 WS_{149}	—	November 28, 2005	Kitt Peak	Spacewatch	·	4.1 km	MPC · JPL
290941	2005 WN_{150}	—	November 28, 2005	Socorro	LINEAR	·	4.3 km	MPC · JPL
290942	2005 WA_{153}	—	November 29, 2005	Kitt Peak	Spacewatch	·	2.7 km	MPC · JPL
290943	2005 WN_{154}	—	November 29, 2005	Palomar	NEAT	VER	4.0 km	MPC · JPL
290944	2005 WF_{156}	—	November 29, 2005	Palomar	NEAT	·	3.7 km	MPC · JPL
290945	2005 WH_{156}	—	November 29, 2005	Palomar	NEAT	EUN	1.7 km	MPC · JPL
290946	2005 WE_{158}	—	November 26, 2005	Mount Lemmon	Mount Lemmon Survey	·	2.2 km	MPC · JPL
290947	2005 WX_{159}	—	November 30, 2005	Kitt Peak	Spacewatch	THM	3.0 km	MPC · JPL
290948	2005 WD_{163}	—	November 29, 2005	Mount Lemmon	Mount Lemmon Survey	·	970 m	MPC · JPL
290949	2005 WZ_{168}	—	November 30, 2005	Kitt Peak	Spacewatch	·	3.8 km	MPC · JPL
290950	2005 WY_{169}	—	November 30, 2005	Kitt Peak	Spacewatch	NYS	1.1 km	MPC · JPL
290951	2005 WV_{171}	—	November 30, 2005	Mount Lemmon	Mount Lemmon Survey	MAS	910 m	MPC · JPL
290952	2005 WZ_{172}	—	November 30, 2005	Mount Lemmon	Mount Lemmon Survey	·	2.3 km	MPC · JPL
290953	2005 WE_{173}	—	November 30, 2005	Kitt Peak	Spacewatch	·	4.7 km	MPC · JPL
290954	2005 WO_{174}	—	November 30, 2005	Socorro	LINEAR	·	5.1 km	MPC · JPL
290955	2005 WO_{178}	—	November 30, 2005	Mount Lemmon	Mount Lemmon Survey	KOR	1.5 km	MPC · JPL
290956	2005 WS_{179}	—	November 21, 2005	Catalina	CSS	·	820 m	MPC · JPL
290957	2005 WP_{180}	—	November 22, 2005	Catalina	CSS	·	2.0 km	MPC · JPL
290958	2005 WC_{181}	—	November 25, 2005	Catalina	CSS	·	4.6 km	MPC · JPL
290959	2005 WZ_{181}	—	November 25, 2005	Catalina	CSS	EOS	2.2 km	MPC · JPL
290960	2005 WO_{185}	—	November 30, 2005	Socorro	LINEAR	·	3.0 km	MPC · JPL
290961	2005 WK_{186}	—	November 29, 2005	Mount Lemmon	Mount Lemmon Survey	·	860 m	MPC · JPL
290962	2005 WU_{190}	—	November 21, 2005	Catalina	CSS	·	3.6 km	MPC · JPL
290963	2005 WE_{191}	—	November 21, 2005	Anderson Mesa	LONEOS	EOS	2.3 km	MPC · JPL
290964	2005 WB_{193}	—	November 26, 2005	Catalina	CSS	·	2.5 km	MPC · JPL
290965	2005 WQ_{197}	—	November 21, 2005	Kitt Peak	Spacewatch	·	2.0 km	MPC · JPL
290966	2005 WS_{207}	—	November 28, 2005	Catalina	CSS	·	1.1 km	MPC · JPL
290967	2005 XH	—	December 1, 2005	Junk Bond	D. Healy	KOR	2.2 km	MPC · JPL
290968	2005 XS_{1}	—	December 4, 2005	Socorro	LINEAR	·	1.1 km	MPC · JPL
290969	2005 XU_{6}	—	December 2, 2005	Mount Lemmon	Mount Lemmon Survey	·	790 m	MPC · JPL
290970	2005 XE_{7}	—	December 4, 2005	Socorro	LINEAR	V	860 m	MPC · JPL
290971	2005 XA_{10}	—	December 1, 2005	Kitt Peak	Spacewatch	·	2.1 km	MPC · JPL
290972	2005 XD_{11}	—	December 1, 2005	Kitt Peak	Spacewatch	·	1.0 km	MPC · JPL
290973	2005 XS_{16}	—	December 1, 2005	Kitt Peak	Spacewatch	·	2.1 km	MPC · JPL
290974	2005 XT_{16}	—	December 1, 2005	Kitt Peak	Spacewatch	·	990 m	MPC · JPL
290975	2005 XH_{17}	—	December 1, 2005	Palomar	NEAT	·	2.0 km	MPC · JPL
290976	2005 XM_{20}	—	December 2, 2005	Kitt Peak	Spacewatch	·	4.0 km	MPC · JPL
290977	2005 XG_{25}	—	December 4, 2005	Kitt Peak	Spacewatch	THM	2.5 km	MPC · JPL
290978	2005 XH_{32}	—	December 4, 2005	Kitt Peak	Spacewatch	·	1.4 km	MPC · JPL
290979	2005 XP_{37}	—	December 4, 2005	Kitt Peak	Spacewatch	·	830 m	MPC · JPL
290980	2005 XH_{41}	—	December 6, 2005	Kitt Peak	Spacewatch	·	1.7 km	MPC · JPL
290981	2005 XZ_{42}	—	December 1, 2005	Catalina	CSS	·	1.7 km	MPC · JPL
290982	2005 XF_{45}	—	December 2, 2005	Kitt Peak	Spacewatch	·	5.9 km	MPC · JPL
290983	2005 XU_{45}	—	December 2, 2005	Kitt Peak	Spacewatch	·	2.7 km	MPC · JPL
290984	2005 XF_{46}	—	December 2, 2005	Kitt Peak	Spacewatch	·	3.7 km	MPC · JPL
290985	2005 XH_{49}	—	December 2, 2005	Kitt Peak	Spacewatch	·	2.2 km	MPC · JPL
290986	2005 XV_{49}	—	December 2, 2005	Kitt Peak	Spacewatch	·	1.1 km	MPC · JPL
290987	2005 XP_{50}	—	December 2, 2005	Kitt Peak	Spacewatch	WIT	1.2 km	MPC · JPL
290988	2005 XY_{50}	—	December 2, 2005	Kitt Peak	Spacewatch	CYB	5.9 km	MPC · JPL
290989	2005 XO_{53}	—	December 4, 2005	Kitt Peak	Spacewatch	AGN	1.3 km	MPC · JPL
290990	2005 XN_{60}	—	December 4, 2005	Kitt Peak	Spacewatch	·	1.1 km	MPC · JPL
290991	2005 XZ_{62}	—	December 5, 2005	Mount Lemmon	Mount Lemmon Survey	CYB	4.3 km	MPC · JPL
290992	2005 XY_{63}	—	December 6, 2005	Socorro	LINEAR	NYS	1.6 km	MPC · JPL
290993	2005 XR_{64}	—	December 7, 2005	Socorro	LINEAR	·	1.2 km	MPC · JPL
290994	2005 XB_{73}	—	December 6, 2005	Kitt Peak	Spacewatch	·	880 m	MPC · JPL
290995	2005 XJ_{74}	—	December 6, 2005	Kitt Peak	Spacewatch	·	2.0 km	MPC · JPL
290996	2005 XQ_{76}	—	December 8, 2005	Kitt Peak	Spacewatch	·	1.3 km	MPC · JPL
290997	2005 XK_{82}	—	December 10, 2005	Kitt Peak	Spacewatch	NYS	1.5 km	MPC · JPL
290998	2005 XV_{82}	—	December 10, 2005	Kitt Peak	Spacewatch	HYG	3.2 km	MPC · JPL
290999	2005 XT_{83}	—	December 6, 2005	Anderson Mesa	LONEOS	·	2.9 km	MPC · JPL
291000	2005 XC_{85}	—	December 2, 2005	Kitt Peak	Spacewatch	HOF	2.6 km	MPC · JPL

back to top

== See also ==
- Meanings of minor-planet names: 290001–291000
