= David Healy (astronomer) =

American astrophotographer

David B. Healy
- Born: 22 December 1936; Los Angeles, California
- Died: 6 June 2011 (aged 74); Sierra Vista, Arizona
- Occupation: astrophotographer

Minor planets discovered: 217
see § List of discovered minor planets

David B. Healy (22 December 1936 – 6 June 2011) was an American astrophotographer and asteroid discoverer who is known for his contributions to Burnham's Celestial Handbook.

== History ==
David B. Healy was born 1936 in Los Angeles, California. He was an automotive industry analyst for Drexel Burnham in New York and later a stock broker before retiring to Arizona. He dedicated his life to Astronomy and the discovery of planets. While in New York, he was a longtime member of the Astronomical Society of Long Island. Once in Sierra Vista, Arizona, he became a valued member of the Huachuca Astronomy Club.

He was well known for his pioneering work in astrophotography (in particular with cooled and hypered emulsion astrophotography before silver became silicon) with multiple contributions to leading astronomy publications. Healy established the Junk Bond Observatory in Arizona for visual work and recoveries of minor planets.

On September 4, 1999, a main-belt asteroid was discovered by Myke Collins and M. White at Anza. It was called 66479 Healy after the founder of the JBO. Healy was also an original contributor to Burnham's Celestial Handbook. The JBO established by Healy operates a 32-inch Ritchey Chretien reflector chiefly for minor planet astrometry and is credited with over 500 discoveries. After his chief co-discoverer Jeffrey Medkeff died in 2008, Dave decided to participate in the search for exoplanets. His telescope is still being used in the search for these planetary systems.

He was a Contributing Editor of Astronomy Magazine. In 2008, Bloomberg Press reviewed Healy's transition from investment analyst to amateur astronomer.

== List of discovered minor planets ==
15512 Snyder	18 October 1999	list^{[A]}
37163 Huachucaclub	19 November 2000	list^{[A]}
38203 Sanner	19 June 1999	list^{[A]}
40328 Dow	20 June 1999	list
46053 Davidpatterson	21 February 2001	list
48070 Zizza	19 March 2001	list
54693 Garymyers	19 March 2001	list
63305 Bobkepple	17 March 2001	list
68218 Nealgalt	12 February 2001	list
72633 Randygroth	22 March 2001	list
99070 Strittmatter	22 March 2001	list
107638 Wendyfreedman	15 March 2001	list
115326 Wehinger	29 September 2003	list
115331 Shrylmiles	29 September 2003	list
115801 Punahou	23 October 2003	list
117381 Lindaweiland	18 December 2004	list
118945 Rikhill	29 November 2000	list
123818 Helenzier	31 January 2001	list
124075 Ketelsen	15 April 2001	list
131245 Bakich	16 March 2001	list
133528 Ceragioli	4 October 2003	list
133753 Teresamullen	21 November 2003	list
(145349) 2005 MS_{15}	27 June 2005	list
146268 Jennipolakis	16 February 2001	list
(149885) 2005 RV_{11}	11 September 2005	list

(149896) 2005 SD_{1}	23 September 2005	list
(149954) 2005 TV_{48}	9 October 2005	list
(149975) 2005 UY_{1}	22 October 2005	list
(152506) 2005 XN_{1}	4 December 2005	list
153289 Rebeccawatson	22 March 2001	list
153298 Paulmyers	29 March 2001	list
(155141) 2005 UY	20 October 2005	list
(155247) 2005 WK_{46}	22 November 2005	list
(157540) 2005 UO_{3}	25 October 2005	list
(159296) 2006 BM_{44}	23 January 2006	list
159778 Bobshelton	24 June 2003	list
159827 Keithmullen	4 October 2003	list
161546 Schneeweis	10 December 2004	list
(161593) 2005 QE_{28}	28 August 2005	list
165612 Stackpole	23 March 2001	list
167113 Robertwick	19 September 2003	list
172525 Adamblock	4 October 2003	list
176103 Waynejohnson	30 January 2001	list
(177824) 2005 NB_{15}	6 July 2005	list
178803 Kristenjohnson	19 March 2001	list
(180947) 2005 MQ_{13}	27 June 2005	list
(181174) 2005 SV_{70}	27 September 2005	list
(181402) 2006 SR_{118}	24 September 2006	list
(184621) 2005 RD_{26}	12 September 2005	list
(184629) 2005 SX_{1}	23 September 2005	list

(185575) 2008 BF_{15}	29 January 2008	list
189930 Jeanneherbert	22 September 2003	list
189948 Richswanson	16 October 2003	list
196807 Beshore	26 September 2003	list
196938 Delgordon	22 October 2003	list
197196 Jamestaylor	15 November 2003	list
(197284) 2003 WV_{107}	24 November 2003	list
(199002) 2005 WO_{55}	28 November 2005	list
(199684) 2006 HY_{16}	20 April 2006	list
(202584) 2006 GO_{3}	7 April 2006	list
(202758) 2007 RJ_{19}	4 September 2007	list
(207521) 2006 JD_{49}	1 May 2006	list
(209643) 2005 BZ_{26}	29 January 2005	list
(209917) 2005 QA_{11}	27 August 2005	list
(209918) 2005 QY_{30}	28 August 2005	list
(210347) 2007 UT_{1}	17 October 2007	list
(212846) 2007 VP_{7}	3 November 2007	list
(214423) 2005 QY_{10}	27 August 2005	list
(216028) 2005 WB_{59}	28 November 2005	list
(216882) 2008 KE	26 May 2008	list
(218348) 2004 FY_{17}	27 March 2004	list
(221229) 2005 UA_{158}	28 October 2005	list
222403 Bethchristie	22 March 2001	list
(224122) 2005 QZ_{10}	27 August 2005	list
(224277) 2005 TU_{52}	14 October 2005	list

(224492) 2005 WQ_{7}	21 November 2005	list
(227332) 2005 UF_{2}	23 October 2005	list
(227483) 2005 XO	1 December 2005	list
(227653) 2006 BQ_{143}	29 January 2006	list
(229388) 2005 SU_{70}	27 September 2005	list
(231059) 2005 NP_{7}	5 July 2005	list
(231282) 2006 BF_{44}	23 January 2006	list
(231290) 2006 BK_{99}	25 January 2006	list
(231535) 2008 ST_{147}	25 September 2008	list
232553 Randypeterson	26 September 2003	list
(233206) 2005 XJ_{27}	5 December 2005	list
(233494) 2007 CW_{26}	12 February 2007	list
(233667) 2008 RQ_{25}	5 September 2008	list
(234336) 2001 FH_{1}	18 March 2001	list
(236806) 2007 RC_{2}	4 September 2007	list
(237012) 2008 RT_{125}	9 September 2008	list
(240629) 2004 YS	16 December 2004	list
(240789) 2005 UM_{156}	28 October 2005	list
(242698) 2005 TS_{52}	11 October 2005	list
(245629) 2005 XK_{27}	6 December 2005	list
(245637) 2005 YZ_{8}	20 December 2005	list
(246382) 2007 UJ_{3}	18 October 2007	list
(249118) 2007 WW_{9}	17 November 2007	list
(249131) 2007 YG_{56}	30 December 2007	list
(250947) 2005 YB_{287}	28 December 2005	list

(254857) 2005 RT_{33}	12 September 2005	list
(255018) 2005 TK_{48}	7 October 2005	list
(255069) 2005 UP_{1}	22 October 2005	list
(255327) 2005 WX_{34}	21 November 2005	list
(255337) 2005 WC_{55}	26 November 2005	list
(256814) 2008 CT_{118}	11 February 2008	list
(259618) 2003 VA_{8}	15 November 2003	list
(261836) 2006 DR_{63}	27 February 2006	list
(265517) 2005 MK_{8}	27 June 2005	list
(265536) 2005 NO_{78}	12 July 2005	list
(265763) 2005 WZ_{5}	21 November 2005	list
(266103) 2006 SB_{131}	24 September 2006	list
(268552) 2006 BG_{8}	22 January 2006	list
(271580) 2004 ML_{3}	20 June 2004	list
(272316) 2005 SW_{70}	27 September 2005	list
(272345) 2005 SP_{134}	30 September 2005	list
(272441) 2005 UR_{1}	22 October 2005	list
(272672) 2005 XP_{1}	4 December 2005	list
(273302) 2006 SS_{118}	24 September 2006	list
(277339) 2005 TM_{45}	6 October 2005	list
(277369) 2005 UZ	20 October 2005	list
(277370) 2005 US_{1}	22 October 2005	list
(277397) 2005 UN_{156}	28 October 2005	list
(278795) 2008 SC_{210}	28 September 2008	list
(281398) 2008 RM_{25}	5 September 2008	list

(289866) 2005 MV_{15}	30 June 2005	list
(290013) 2005 QE_{11}	27 August 2005	list
(290163) 2005 RT_{11}	11 September 2005	list
(290357) 2005 SF_{261}	27 September 2005	list
(290486) 2005 UX_{1}	22 October 2005	list
(290866) 2005 WL_{55}	28 November 2005	list
(290967) 2005 XH	1 December 2005	list
(291013) 2005 YY_{6}	21 December 2005	list
(291225) 2006 BJ_{8}	22 January 2006	list
(292453) 2006 SX_{359}	30 September 2006	list
(294215) 2007 UK_{3}	18 October 2007	list
(294741) 2008 CX_{1}	2 February 2008	list
(299240) 2005 MU_{15}	30 June 2005	list
(299465) 2006 BL_{103}	23 January 2006	list
(301023) 2008 SN_{67}	21 September 2008	list
(301053) 2008 UX_{1}	22 October 2008	list
(305397) 2008 CB_{74}	9 February 2008	list
(309237) 2007 RB_{2}	4 September 2007	list
(310357) 2011 UE_{266}	8 October 2005	list
(314271) 2005 RF_{26}	12 September 2005	list
(314466) 2005 WR_{58}	30 November 2005	list
(316958) 2001 FG_{1}	18 March 2001	list
(319072) 2005 WY_{56}	29 November 2005	list
(319109) 2005 XG	1 December 2005	list
(320516) 2007 YP_{3}	16 December 2007	list

(320692) 2008 DS	24 February 2008	list
(322378) 2011 MV_{9}	5 March 2006	list
(326779) 2003 SM_{224}	30 September 2003	list
(326814) 2003 TN_{9}	13 October 2003	list
(326827) 2003 UL_{7}	18 October 2003	list
(327188) 2005 MQ_{5}	27 June 2005	list
(327430) 2005 WA_{59}	28 November 2005	list
(330394) 2006 YP_{14}	25 December 2006	list
(335333) 2005 RR_{11}	11 September 2005	list
(335415) 2005 UT_{1}	22 October 2005	list
(337339) 2001 FL_{31}	23 March 2001	list
(340077) 2005 WP_{7}	21 November 2005	list
(346089) 2007 VQ_{7}	4 November 2007	list
(349044) 2006 VC_{122}	14 November 2006	list
(350382) 2012 UF_{164}	21 November 2003	list
(351507) 2005 RK_{29}	12 September 2005	list
(351509) 2005 RS_{33}	12 September 2005	list
(352304) 2007 UT_{5}	18 October 2007	list
(353766) 2012 FQ_{28}	5 June 2005	list
(354703) 2005 RS_{11}	11 September 2005	list
(355559) 2008 CN_{20}	6 February 2008	list
(358276) 2006 UX_{16}	16 October 2006	list
(360867) 2005 RE_{26}	12 September 2005	list
(361023) 2005 WV_{56}	29 November 2005	list
(361673) 2007 UU_{1}	17 October 2007	list

(362554) 2010 VZ_{1}	30 November 2005	list
(362860) 2012 BJ_{58}	7 October 2005	list
(363439) 2003 SE_{112}	21 September 2003	list
(365958) 2012 BZ_{16}	29 November 2005	list
(368771) 2005 WC_{19}	22 November 2005	list
(372163) 2008 TT_{8}	6 October 2008	list
(374353) 2005 UO_{156}	28 October 2005	list
(377708) 2005 WW_{56}	29 November 2005	list
(377765) 2005 YH_{87}	21 December 2005	list
(380717) 2005 QD_{11}	27 August 2005	list
(381964) 2010 EM_{105}	13 June 2005	list
(383131) 2005 UX	20 October 2005	list
(385650) 2005 RW_{11}	11 September 2005	list
(385693) 2005 TR_{52}	11 October 2005	list
(386355) 2008 TU_{8}	6 October 2008	list
(388036) 2005 SQ_{134}	30 September 2005	list
(388179) 2006 BK_{147}	31 January 2006	list
(393912) 2005 UL_{26}	23 October 2005	list
(394058) 2005 XF	1 December 2005	list
(394675) 2008 CK_{74}	10 February 2008	list
(397818) 2008 SN_{2}	22 September 2008	list
(400387) 2007 YH_{56}	30 December 2007	list
(402448) 2006 BX_{58}	23 January 2006	list
(402753) 2006 YQ_{14}	25 December 2006	list
(405726) 2005 XJ	1 December 2005	list

(423161) 2004 FG	16 March 2004	list
(423531) 2005 UQ_{158}	31 October 2005	list
(423690) 2006 AZ_{4}	7 January 2006	list
(423712) 2006 BQ_{62}	25 January 2006	list
(424662) 2008 RL_{25}	5 September 2008	list
(434636) 2005 WA_{57}	29 November 2005	list
(435395) 2007 YA_{30}	28 December 2007	list
(435561) 2008 RN_{25}	5 September 2008	list
(440619) 2005 WS_{9}	21 November 2005	list
(444327) 2005 WL_{38}	22 November 2005	list
(452734) 2006 BU_{25}	23 January 2006	list
(465351) 2007 XJ_{1}	3 December 2007	list
(481231) 2005 WN_{55}	28 November 2005	list
(481488) 2007 CZ_{53}	15 February 2007	list
(488917) 2005 UM_{1}	20 October 2005	list
(497333) 2005 UW_{1}	22 October 2005	list
(546006) 2011 WP_{45}	5 June 2005	list
Co-discovery made with:^{A} J. Medkeff
