= List of named minor planets: Q =

This is a partial list of named minor planets, containing all those starting with the letter Q, as of 17 August 2026. It is ordered in a case-insensitive, alphabetical manner and contains a total of 59 entries. Grey minor planets have no article and redirect to the list of minor planets instead (see List of minor planets § Main index).

== Q ==
- 199947 Qaidam
- 20601 Qasimafghan
- 189347 Qian
- 24956 Qiannan
- 364192 Qianruhu
- 25240 Qiansanqiang
- 283279 Qianweichang
- 3763 Qianxuesen
- 24191 Qiaochuyuan
- 20602 Qichengzhang
- 336877 Qifaren
- 20278 Qileihang
- 321197 Qingdao
- 11139 Qingdaoligong
- 2255 Qinghai
- 25042 Qiujun
- 17603 Qoyllurwasi
- 1297 Quadea
- 10200 Quadri
- 349237 Quaglietti
- 3876 Quaide
- 5865 Qualytemocrina
- 260366 Quanah
- 9911 Quantz
- 3335 Quanzhou
- 50000 Quaoar
- 32807 Quarenghi
- 17438 Quasimodo
- 35165 Québec
- 5457 Queen's
- 177415 Queloz
- 423645 Quénisset
- 74168 Quentinleicht
- 8643 Quercus
- 78652 Quero
- 8755 Querquedula
- 9588 Quesnay
- 1239 Queteleta
- 1915 Quetzálcoatl
- 128633 Queyras
- 18699 Quigley
- 4372 Quincy
- 23890 Quindou
- 13192 Quine
- 107561 Quinn
- 27178 Quino
- 369423 Quintegr'al
- 9569 Quintenmatsijs
- 26940 Quintero
- 755 Quintilla
- 18376 Quirk
- 58098 Quirrenbach
- 10793 Quito
- 52301 Qumran
- 28275 Quoc-Bao
- 3513 Quqinyue
- 718492 Quro
- 34204 Quryshi
- 6600 Qwerty
back to top

== See also ==
- List of minor planet discoverers
- List of observatory codes
- Meanings of minor planet names § Index
