= Quintilla (disambiguation) =

Quintilla was a 3rd-century prophetess.

Quintilla may also refer to:

- 755 Quintilla, a minor planet
- Quintilla (poetry), a Spanish poetic form
- Neptis quintilla, an African species of butterfly
- Elvira Quintillá (1928–2013), a Spanish actress
- Florian Quintilla (born 1988), a French professional rugby league footballer
- Jordi Quintillà (born 1993), a Spanish association footballer
- Xavi Quintillà (born 1996), a Spanish association footballer
