= 755 Quintilla =

Main-belt asteroid

Discovery
- Discovered by: J. H. Metcalf
- Discovery site: Taunton Obs.
- Discovery date: 6 April 1908

Designations
- Pronunciation: /kwɪnˈtɪlə/
- Named after: Quintilla (Italian first name)
- Alternative designations: A908 GC · 1933 UF; 1908 CZ
- Minor planet category: main-belt · (outer); background

Orbital characteristics
- Epoch 31 May 2020 (JD 2459000.5)
- Uncertainty parameter 0
- Observation arc: 104.66 yr (38,226 d)
- Aphelion: 3.6182 AU
- Perihelion: 2.7446 AU
- Semi-major axis: 3.1814 AU
- Eccentricity: 0.1373
- Orbital period (sidereal): 5.67 yr (2,073 d)
- Mean anomaly: 294.13°
- Mean motion: 0° 10^{m} 25.32^{s} / day
- Inclination: 3.2423°
- Longitude of ascending node: 176.67°
- Argument of perihelion: 43.965°

Physical characteristics
- Mean diameter: 31.32±1.20 km; 36.04±2.1 km; 41.210±0.655 km
- Synodic rotation period: 4.552 h
- Geometric albedo: 0.124±0.012; 0.1621±0.021; 0.220±0.019
- Spectral type: Tholen = M; U–B = 0.220±0.023; B–V = 0.670±0.030; V–R = 0.410±0.030
- Absolute magnitude (H): 9.7; 9.81

755 Quintilla (prov. designation: A908 GC or 1908 CZ) is a metallic background asteroid from the outer regions of the asteroid belt, approximately 36 kilometers (22 miles) in diameter. It was discovered on 6 April 1908, by American astronomer Joel Metcalf at the Taunton Observatory (803) in Massachusetts, United States. For its size, the M-type asteroid has a relatively short rotation period of 4.55 hours. It was named Quintilla, an Italian female first name, for no reason other than being the first asteroid name beginning with the letter "Q".

== Orbit and classification ==
Quintilla is a non-family asteroid of the main belt's background population when applying the hierarchical clustering method to its proper orbital elements. It orbits the Sun in the outer asteroid belt at a distance of 2.7–3.6 AU once every 5 years and 8 months (2,073 days; semi-major axis of 3.18 AU). Its orbit has an eccentricity of 0.14 and an inclination of 3° with respect to the ecliptic. The body's observation arc begins at Vienna Observatory on 1 September 1915, almost 7 years after its official discovery observation by Joel Metcalf at Taunton.

== Naming ==
This minor planet was named Quintilla, a name of an Italian first name, that was proposed by Arville D. Walker, secretary to the American astronomer and director of Harvard Observatory Harlow Shapley (1885–1972), as no other asteroid name began with the letter "Q" when it was named in 1926. The naming was mentioned in The Names of the Minor Planets by Paul Herget in 1955 (H 76).

== Physical characteristics ==
In the Tholen classification, Quintilla is a metallic M-type asteroid.

=== Rotation period ===
Several rotational lightcurves of Quintilla were obtained from photometric observations. Analysis of the best-rated lightcurves by Robert K. Buchheim and Donald Pray (2004), Laurent Bernasconi, Reiner Stoss, Petra Korlević, Maja Hren, Aleksandar Cikota, Ljuban Jerosimic, and Raoul Behrend (2005), as well as Joseph Masiero (2006), gave a well-defined rotation period of (4.552±0.001), (4.5516±0.0002) and (4.552±0.002) hours with a brightness variation of (0.38±0.02), (0.08±0.01) and (0.45±0.2) magnitude, respectively (U=3/3/3). In November 2018, Michael and Matthew Fauerbach obtained a period of (4.552±0.002) hours and an amplitude of (0.16±0.02) magnitude (U=2).

=== Diameter and albedo ===
According to the surveys carried out by the Japanese Akari satellite, the Infrared Astronomical Satellite IRAS, and the NEOWISE mission of NASA's Wide-field Infrared Survey Explorer (WISE), Quintilla measures (31.32±1.20), (36.04±2.1) and (41.210±0.655) kilometers in diameter and its surface has an albedo of (0.220±0.019), (0.1621±0.021) and (0.124±0.012), respectively.

Alternative mean-diameter measurements published by the WISE team include (46.09±5.63 km) and (49.868±0.660 km) with corresponding albedos of (0.083±0.387) and (0.0848±0.0103). The Collaborative Asteroid Lightcurve Link derives an albedo of 0.1781 and a diameter of 36.16 kilometers based on an absolute magnitude of 9.7.
