= List of minor planets: 423001–424000 =

The following is a partial list of minor planets, running from minor-planet number 423001 through 424000, inclusive. The primary data for this and other partial lists is based on JPL's "Small-Body Orbital Elements" and data available from the Minor Planet Center. Critical list information is also provided by the MPC, unless otherwise specified from Lowell Observatory. A detailed description of the table's columns and additional sources are given on the main page including a complete list of every page in this series, and a statistical break-up on the dynamical classification of minor planets.

Also see the summary list of all named bodies in numerical and alphabetical order, and the corresponding naming citations for the number range of this particular list. New namings may only be added to this list after official publication, as the preannouncement of names is condemned by the Working Group for Small Bodies Nomenclature of the International Astronomical Union.

Near-Earth obj.	MBA (inner)	MBA (outer)	Centaur
Mars-crosser	MBA (middle)	Jupiter trojan	Trans-Neptunian obj.
Unclassified

== 423001–423100 ==
Designation			Discovery			Properties		Ref
Permanent	Provisional	Named after	Date	Site	Discoverer(s)	Category	Diam.	Ref
423001	2003 SK_{247}	—	September 26, 2003	Socorro	LINEAR	·	2.1 km	MPC · JPL
423002	2003 SH_{250}	—	September 20, 2003	Socorro	LINEAR	PHO	1.2 km	MPC · JPL
423003	2003 SC_{254}	—	September 27, 2003	Kitt Peak	Spacewatch	·	2.5 km	MPC · JPL
423004	2003 SP_{259}	—	September 28, 2003	Kitt Peak	Spacewatch	·	1.0 km	MPC · JPL
423005	2003 SS_{263}	—	September 28, 2003	Socorro	LINEAR	(2076)	940 m	MPC · JPL
423006	2003 ST_{276}	—	September 30, 2003	Kitt Peak	Spacewatch	·	1.9 km	MPC · JPL
423007	2003 SO_{282}	—	September 19, 2003	Kitt Peak	Spacewatch	·	1.6 km	MPC · JPL
423008	2003 SO_{300}	—	September 17, 2003	Palomar	NEAT	·	720 m	MPC · JPL
423009	2003 SZ_{325}	—	September 18, 2003	Socorro	LINEAR	NYS	900 m	MPC · JPL
423010	2003 ST_{333}	—	September 26, 2003	Apache Point	SDSS	·	2.3 km	MPC · JPL
423011	2003 SD_{345}	—	September 18, 2003	Anderson Mesa	LONEOS	·	720 m	MPC · JPL
423012	2003 SR_{373}	—	September 26, 2003	Apache Point	SDSS	·	590 m	MPC · JPL
423013	2003 SJ_{392}	—	September 26, 2003	Apache Point	SDSS	·	590 m	MPC · JPL
423014	2003 SG_{395}	—	September 26, 2003	Apache Point	SDSS	·	790 m	MPC · JPL
423015	2003 SR_{403}	—	September 27, 2003	Kitt Peak	Spacewatch	·	680 m	MPC · JPL
423016	2003 SQ_{405}	—	September 27, 2003	Apache Point	SDSS	V	650 m	MPC · JPL
423017	2003 SX_{407}	—	September 27, 2003	Apache Point	SDSS	·	2.5 km	MPC · JPL
423018	2003 SN_{412}	—	September 28, 2003	Apache Point	SDSS	KOR	1.2 km	MPC · JPL
423019	2003 SK_{420}	—	September 29, 2003	Kitt Peak	Spacewatch	·	760 m	MPC · JPL
423020	2003 SV_{427}	—	September 26, 2003	Apache Point	SDSS	·	1.8 km	MPC · JPL
423021	2003 SN_{430}	—	September 17, 2003	Kitt Peak	Spacewatch	·	690 m	MPC · JPL
423022	2003 TJ_{2}	—	October 6, 2003	Socorro	LINEAR	APO	580 m	MPC · JPL
423023	2003 TW_{7}	—	October 3, 2003	Haleakala	NEAT	·	2.3 km	MPC · JPL
423024	2003 TN_{13}	—	October 14, 2003	Anderson Mesa	LONEOS	H	620 m	MPC · JPL
423025	2003 TB_{21}	—	October 15, 2003	Anderson Mesa	LONEOS	·	1.3 km	MPC · JPL
423026	2003 TH_{38}	—	September 21, 2003	Kitt Peak	Spacewatch	·	710 m	MPC · JPL
423027	2003 TO_{56}	—	October 5, 2003	Kitt Peak	Spacewatch	·	1.7 km	MPC · JPL
423028	2003 UZ	—	October 16, 2003	Kitt Peak	Spacewatch	·	2.2 km	MPC · JPL
423029	2003 UJ_{1}	—	October 16, 2003	Palomar	NEAT	·	1.4 km	MPC · JPL
423030	2003 UD_{7}	—	October 16, 2003	Anderson Mesa	LONEOS	H	700 m	MPC · JPL
423031	2003 UO_{11}	—	October 20, 2003	Socorro	LINEAR	·	1.4 km	MPC · JPL
423032	2003 UP_{54}	—	October 18, 2003	Palomar	NEAT	·	910 m	MPC · JPL
423033	2003 UK_{59}	—	October 17, 2003	Anderson Mesa	LONEOS	·	790 m	MPC · JPL
423034	2003 UC_{66}	—	October 16, 2003	Palomar	NEAT	PHO	1.1 km	MPC · JPL
423035	2003 UR_{69}	—	September 21, 2003	Kitt Peak	Spacewatch	·	1.7 km	MPC · JPL
423036	2003 UP_{73}	—	October 19, 2003	Kitt Peak	Spacewatch	EOS	1.6 km	MPC · JPL
423037	2003 UK_{74}	—	October 16, 2003	Campo Imperatore	CINEOS	·	2.9 km	MPC · JPL
423038	2003 UQ_{78}	—	October 1, 2003	Kitt Peak	Spacewatch	·	910 m	MPC · JPL
423039	2003 UM_{91}	—	October 20, 2003	Socorro	LINEAR	·	750 m	MPC · JPL
423040	2003 UL_{101}	—	October 20, 2003	Kitt Peak	Spacewatch	·	890 m	MPC · JPL
423041	2003 UF_{103}	—	October 20, 2003	Kitt Peak	Spacewatch	·	1.1 km	MPC · JPL
423042	2003 US_{104}	—	October 18, 2003	Kitt Peak	Spacewatch	·	870 m	MPC · JPL
423043	2003 UM_{120}	—	October 18, 2003	Kitt Peak	Spacewatch	EOS	1.7 km	MPC · JPL
423044	2003 UE_{164}	—	October 21, 2003	Socorro	LINEAR	·	1.2 km	MPC · JPL
423045	2003 UA_{177}	—	October 21, 2003	Anderson Mesa	LONEOS	·	620 m	MPC · JPL
423046	2003 UE_{185}	—	October 21, 2003	Palomar	NEAT	·	1.6 km	MPC · JPL
423047	2003 UB_{188}	—	October 22, 2003	Socorro	LINEAR	·	930 m	MPC · JPL
423048	2003 UH_{191}	—	October 1, 2003	Kitt Peak	Spacewatch	EOS	1.7 km	MPC · JPL
423049	2003 UA_{204}	—	October 21, 2003	Kitt Peak	Spacewatch	·	580 m	MPC · JPL
423050	2003 UT_{230}	—	October 23, 2003	Kitt Peak	Spacewatch	·	770 m	MPC · JPL
423051	2003 UY_{266}	—	October 28, 2003	Socorro	LINEAR	·	800 m	MPC · JPL
423052	2003 UN_{267}	—	October 28, 2003	Socorro	LINEAR	·	1.1 km	MPC · JPL
423053	2003 UL_{315}	—	October 16, 2003	Kitt Peak	Spacewatch	·	1.3 km	MPC · JPL
423054	2003 UM_{316}	—	October 24, 2003	Socorro	LINEAR	·	900 m	MPC · JPL
423055	2003 US_{317}	—	October 23, 2003	Apache Point	SDSS	KOR	1.3 km	MPC · JPL
423056	2003 UZ_{325}	—	October 17, 2003	Apache Point	SDSS	·	1.6 km	MPC · JPL
423057	2003 UL_{339}	—	October 3, 2003	Kitt Peak	Spacewatch	·	570 m	MPC · JPL
423058	2003 UQ_{353}	—	October 19, 2003	Apache Point	SDSS	·	2.0 km	MPC · JPL
423059	2003 WS_{2}	—	October 24, 2003	Socorro	LINEAR	·	750 m	MPC · JPL
423060	2003 WK_{19}	—	November 19, 2003	Socorro	LINEAR	·	3.8 km	MPC · JPL
423061	2003 WD_{47}	—	November 18, 2003	Palomar	NEAT	·	2.1 km	MPC · JPL
423062	2003 WG_{68}	—	November 19, 2003	Kitt Peak	Spacewatch	·	3.4 km	MPC · JPL
423063	2003 WM_{79}	—	November 20, 2003	Socorro	LINEAR	·	1.0 km	MPC · JPL
423064	2003 WW_{86}	—	November 21, 2003	Socorro	LINEAR	·	890 m	MPC · JPL
423065	2003 WC_{94}	—	November 19, 2003	Anderson Mesa	LONEOS	·	890 m	MPC · JPL
423066	2003 WG_{102}	—	November 21, 2003	Socorro	LINEAR	H	640 m	MPC · JPL
423067	2003 WA_{123}	—	November 20, 2003	Socorro	LINEAR	·	1.5 km	MPC · JPL
423068	2003 WJ_{129}	—	November 21, 2003	Socorro	LINEAR	ERI	1.7 km	MPC · JPL
423069	2003 WG_{151}	—	November 26, 2003	Kitt Peak	Spacewatch	(2076)	850 m	MPC · JPL
423070	2003 WZ_{152}	—	October 25, 2003	Socorro	LINEAR	·	2.5 km	MPC · JPL
423071	2003 WN_{166}	—	November 18, 2003	Catalina	CSS	·	1.8 km	MPC · JPL
423072	2003 WY_{192}	—	November 21, 2003	Socorro	LINEAR	·	3.1 km	MPC · JPL
423073	2003 WB_{194}	—	November 19, 2003	Kitt Peak	Spacewatch	·	2.1 km	MPC · JPL
423074	2003 WG_{194}	—	November 26, 2003	Kitt Peak	Spacewatch	MAS	540 m	MPC · JPL
423075	2003 WP_{194}	—	November 16, 2003	Kitt Peak	Spacewatch	·	820 m	MPC · JPL
423076	2003 XV_{14}	—	December 14, 2003	Palomar	NEAT	H	630 m	MPC · JPL
423077	2003 XL_{15}	—	December 15, 2003	Needville	Needville	·	4.8 km	MPC · JPL
423078	2003 XC_{25}	—	December 1, 2003	Kitt Peak	Spacewatch	·	2.3 km	MPC · JPL
423079	2003 XX_{26}	—	December 1, 2003	Socorro	LINEAR	EOS	2.0 km	MPC · JPL
423080	2003 XL_{30}	—	December 1, 2003	Kitt Peak	Spacewatch	·	2.8 km	MPC · JPL
423081	2003 XN_{34}	—	December 1, 2003	Kitt Peak	Spacewatch	·	1.9 km	MPC · JPL
423082	2003 YA_{1}	—	December 17, 2003	Socorro	LINEAR	H	750 m	MPC · JPL
423083	2003 YH_{31}	—	December 18, 2003	Socorro	LINEAR	NYS	780 m	MPC · JPL
423084	2003 YU_{36}	—	December 17, 2003	Kitt Peak	Spacewatch	·	920 m	MPC · JPL
423085	2003 YF_{42}	—	December 19, 2003	Kitt Peak	Spacewatch	NYS	800 m	MPC · JPL
423086	2003 YZ_{44}	—	December 20, 2003	Socorro	LINEAR	·	1.1 km	MPC · JPL
423087	2003 YC_{72}	—	December 18, 2003	Socorro	LINEAR	·	930 m	MPC · JPL
423088	2003 YA_{88}	—	December 19, 2003	Socorro	LINEAR	·	3.7 km	MPC · JPL
423089	2003 YV_{88}	—	December 19, 2003	Kitt Peak	Spacewatch	·	2.1 km	MPC · JPL
423090	2003 YX_{93}	—	December 21, 2003	Kitt Peak	Spacewatch	·	4.5 km	MPC · JPL
423091	2003 YX_{109}	—	December 23, 2003	Socorro	LINEAR	·	930 m	MPC · JPL
423092	2003 YW_{112}	—	December 23, 2003	Socorro	LINEAR	·	5.2 km	MPC · JPL
423093	2003 YS_{127}	—	December 27, 2003	Socorro	LINEAR	·	3.2 km	MPC · JPL
423094	2003 YL_{129}	—	December 27, 2003	Socorro	LINEAR	·	3.7 km	MPC · JPL
423095	2003 YZ_{144}	—	December 28, 2003	Socorro	LINEAR	·	2.9 km	MPC · JPL
423096	2003 YJ_{160}	—	December 17, 2003	Socorro	LINEAR	·	1.1 km	MPC · JPL
423097 Richardjarrell	2003 YL_{177}	Richardjarrell	December 16, 2003	Mauna Kea	D. D. Balam	·	740 m	MPC · JPL
423098	2004 AD_{3}	—	December 28, 2003	Socorro	LINEAR	H	540 m	MPC · JPL
423099	2004 AZ_{18}	—	January 15, 2004	Kitt Peak	Spacewatch	L5	13 km	MPC · JPL
423100	2004 BX_{1}	—	January 17, 2004	Palomar	NEAT	T_{j} (2.86) · APO	730 m	MPC · JPL

== 423101–423200 ==
back to top

Designation			Discovery			Properties		Ref
Permanent	Provisional	Named after	Date	Site	Discoverer(s)	Category	Diam.	Ref
423101	2004 BB_{4}	—	January 16, 2004	Palomar	NEAT	·	1.1 km	MPC · JPL
423102	2004 BG_{5}	—	January 16, 2004	Palomar	NEAT	·	1.1 km	MPC · JPL
423103	2004 BM_{6}	—	January 16, 2004	Kitt Peak	Spacewatch	·	860 m	MPC · JPL
423104	2004 BL_{12}	—	January 17, 2004	Palomar	NEAT	·	930 m	MPC · JPL
423105	2004 BF_{13}	—	January 17, 2004	Palomar	NEAT	·	4.2 km	MPC · JPL
423106	2004 BF_{17}	—	January 17, 2004	Palomar	NEAT	·	3.0 km	MPC · JPL
423107	2004 BL_{17}	—	January 17, 2004	Palomar	NEAT	T_{j} (2.97)	4.0 km	MPC · JPL
423108	2004 BC_{18}	—	January 18, 2004	Catalina	CSS	·	2.4 km	MPC · JPL
423109	2004 BB_{23}	—	January 17, 2004	Palomar	NEAT	·	970 m	MPC · JPL
423110	2004 BU_{26}	—	December 18, 2003	Socorro	LINEAR	H	590 m	MPC · JPL
423111	2004 BT_{54}	—	January 22, 2004	Socorro	LINEAR	·	2.0 km	MPC · JPL
423112	2004 BB_{79}	—	January 22, 2004	Socorro	LINEAR	·	4.8 km	MPC · JPL
423113	2004 BT_{95}	—	January 17, 2004	Palomar	NEAT	H	700 m	MPC · JPL
423114	2004 BG_{96}	—	January 24, 2004	Socorro	LINEAR	·	3.2 km	MPC · JPL
423115	2004 BM_{96}	—	January 24, 2004	Socorro	LINEAR	·	1.3 km	MPC · JPL
423116	2004 BH_{98}	—	January 27, 2004	Kitt Peak	Spacewatch	·	940 m	MPC · JPL
423117	2004 BZ_{108}	—	January 28, 2004	Catalina	CSS	·	4.9 km	MPC · JPL
423118	2004 BV_{109}	—	January 28, 2004	Kitt Peak	Spacewatch	·	3.3 km	MPC · JPL
423119	2004 BR_{112}	—	January 13, 2004	Kitt Peak	Spacewatch	·	3.1 km	MPC · JPL
423120	2004 BE_{119}	—	January 30, 2004	Socorro	LINEAR	·	1.3 km	MPC · JPL
423121	2004 BL_{130}	—	January 16, 2004	Kitt Peak	Spacewatch	·	3.1 km	MPC · JPL
423122	2004 BY_{138}	—	September 18, 1995	Kitt Peak	Spacewatch	NYS	980 m	MPC · JPL
423123	2004 BC_{141}	—	January 19, 2004	Kitt Peak	Spacewatch	THM	2.4 km	MPC · JPL
423124	2004 CW	—	December 28, 2003	Socorro	LINEAR	·	2.7 km	MPC · JPL
423125	2004 CX_{14}	—	February 11, 2004	Kitt Peak	Spacewatch	·	5.0 km	MPC · JPL
423126	2004 CA_{17}	—	February 11, 2004	Kitt Peak	Spacewatch	HYG	2.9 km	MPC · JPL
423127	2004 CP_{20}	—	February 11, 2004	Kitt Peak	Spacewatch	·	2.3 km	MPC · JPL
423128	2004 CU_{21}	—	February 11, 2004	Palomar	NEAT	·	3.1 km	MPC · JPL
423129	2004 CR_{29}	—	January 30, 2004	Kitt Peak	Spacewatch	·	1.1 km	MPC · JPL
423130	2004 CT_{32}	—	January 30, 2004	Kitt Peak	Spacewatch	VER	3.5 km	MPC · JPL
423131	2004 CR_{33}	—	February 12, 2004	Kitt Peak	Spacewatch	LIX	3.0 km	MPC · JPL
423132	2004 CV_{44}	—	February 13, 2004	Kitt Peak	Spacewatch	NYS	900 m	MPC · JPL
423133	2004 CV_{53}	—	February 11, 2004	Kitt Peak	Spacewatch	·	3.0 km	MPC · JPL
423134	2004 CO_{58}	—	February 10, 2004	Palomar	NEAT	·	1.4 km	MPC · JPL
423135	2004 CX_{63}	—	February 13, 2004	Palomar	NEAT	·	4.4 km	MPC · JPL
423136	2004 CC_{82}	—	February 12, 2004	Kitt Peak	Spacewatch	VER	3.0 km	MPC · JPL
423137	2004 CR_{89}	—	February 11, 2004	Kitt Peak	Spacewatch	·	3.0 km	MPC · JPL
423138	2004 CJ_{92}	—	February 14, 2004	Socorro	LINEAR	·	4.2 km	MPC · JPL
423139	2004 CK_{109}	—	February 15, 2004	Haleakala	NEAT	·	4.2 km	MPC · JPL
423140	2004 CW_{110}	—	January 24, 2004	Socorro	LINEAR	·	3.6 km	MPC · JPL
423141	2004 DJ_{18}	—	February 18, 2004	Haleakala	NEAT	·	3.6 km	MPC · JPL
423142	2004 DK_{56}	—	February 22, 2004	Kitt Peak	Spacewatch	NYS	1.3 km	MPC · JPL
423143	2004 DO_{59}	—	February 25, 2004	Desert Eagle	W. K. Y. Yeung	NYS	1.1 km	MPC · JPL
423144	2004 DR_{62}	—	February 26, 2004	Socorro	LINEAR	·	2.6 km	MPC · JPL
423145	2004 DU_{65}	—	February 23, 2004	Socorro	LINEAR	NYS	1.0 km	MPC · JPL
423146	2004 EA_{1}	—	March 10, 2004	Palomar	NEAT	H	670 m	MPC · JPL
423147	2004 EX_{13}	—	March 11, 2004	Palomar	NEAT	·	3.4 km	MPC · JPL
423148	2004 EA_{33}	—	March 15, 2004	Palomar	NEAT	·	5.1 km	MPC · JPL
423149	2004 EK_{33}	—	February 13, 2004	Kitt Peak	Spacewatch	·	1.1 km	MPC · JPL
423150	2004 ET_{47}	—	March 15, 2004	Catalina	CSS	PHO	820 m	MPC · JPL
423151	2004 EK_{59}	—	March 15, 2004	Palomar	NEAT	·	3.6 km	MPC · JPL
423152	2004 EF_{67}	—	March 15, 2004	Kitt Peak	Spacewatch	·	1.2 km	MPC · JPL
423153	2004 EZ_{74}	—	March 14, 2004	Kitt Peak	Spacewatch	·	2.5 km	MPC · JPL
423154	2004 ED_{77}	—	March 15, 2004	Catalina	CSS	NYS	1.3 km	MPC · JPL
423155	2004 EN_{81}	—	March 15, 2004	Socorro	LINEAR	·	1.1 km	MPC · JPL
423156	2004 EJ_{90}	—	March 14, 2004	Kitt Peak	Spacewatch	·	1.1 km	MPC · JPL
423157	2004 ET_{90}	—	March 14, 2004	Kitt Peak	Spacewatch	NYS	1.1 km	MPC · JPL
423158	2004 EU_{96}	—	March 12, 2004	Palomar	NEAT	NYS	1.1 km	MPC · JPL
423159	2004 EB_{107}	—	March 15, 2004	Kitt Peak	Spacewatch	THM	2.0 km	MPC · JPL
423160	2004 EZ_{114}	—	March 14, 2004	Kitt Peak	Spacewatch	·	2.7 km	MPC · JPL
423161	2004 FG	—	March 16, 2004	Junk Bond	D. Healy	·	2.8 km	MPC · JPL
423162	2004 FD_{1}	—	March 17, 2004	Socorro	LINEAR	·	730 m	MPC · JPL
423163	2004 FD_{18}	—	March 25, 2004	Wrightwood	J. W. Young	·	990 m	MPC · JPL
423164	2004 FE_{21}	—	February 19, 2004	Socorro	LINEAR	PHO	1.3 km	MPC · JPL
423165	2004 FY_{24}	—	March 17, 2004	Socorro	LINEAR	·	4.6 km	MPC · JPL
423166	2004 FR_{34}	—	March 16, 2004	Socorro	LINEAR	·	1.3 km	MPC · JPL
423167	2004 FY_{46}	—	March 17, 2004	Socorro	LINEAR	·	1.4 km	MPC · JPL
423168	2004 FO_{55}	—	March 19, 2004	Socorro	LINEAR	·	1.3 km	MPC · JPL
423169	2004 FW_{58}	—	March 17, 2004	Kitt Peak	Spacewatch	MAS	760 m	MPC · JPL
423170	2004 FO_{82}	—	March 17, 2004	Kitt Peak	Spacewatch	·	1.5 km	MPC · JPL
423171	2004 FS_{94}	—	March 18, 2004	Palomar	NEAT	·	1.3 km	MPC · JPL
423172	2004 FF_{157}	—	March 17, 2004	Kitt Peak	Spacewatch	MAS	750 m	MPC · JPL
423173	2004 FS_{166}	—	March 25, 2004	Siding Spring	SSS	·	1.3 km	MPC · JPL
423174	2004 GA_{5}	—	April 11, 2004	Palomar	NEAT	·	4.3 km	MPC · JPL
423175	2004 GZ_{8}	—	April 12, 2004	Kitt Peak	Spacewatch	THB	3.2 km	MPC · JPL
423176	2004 GJ_{27}	—	April 15, 2004	Socorro	LINEAR	·	1.6 km	MPC · JPL
423177	2004 GU_{32}	—	March 27, 2004	Socorro	LINEAR	·	1.3 km	MPC · JPL
423178	2004 GA_{63}	—	April 13, 2004	Kitt Peak	Spacewatch	·	2.3 km	MPC · JPL
423179	2004 GV_{74}	—	April 15, 2004	Socorro	LINEAR	·	1.8 km	MPC · JPL
423180	2004 GU_{77}	—	April 15, 2004	Socorro	LINEAR	·	3.4 km	MPC · JPL
423181	2004 GM_{86}	—	April 14, 2004	Kitt Peak	Spacewatch	HYG	3.2 km	MPC · JPL
423182	2004 HH_{45}	—	April 21, 2004	Socorro	LINEAR	PHO	1.1 km	MPC · JPL
423183	2004 JE_{48}	—	May 13, 2004	Kitt Peak	Spacewatch	THM	2.4 km	MPC · JPL
423184	2004 JS_{49}	—	May 13, 2004	Kitt Peak	Spacewatch	·	1.6 km	MPC · JPL
423185	2004 KU_{10}	—	May 18, 2004	Socorro	LINEAR	·	4.9 km	MPC · JPL
423186	2004 LK_{1}	—	June 9, 2004	Socorro	LINEAR	·	3.9 km	MPC · JPL
423187	2004 LC_{13}	—	June 11, 2004	Campo Imperatore	CINEOS	·	2.0 km	MPC · JPL
423188	2004 NO_{8}	—	July 10, 2004	Needville	J. Dellinger, Eastman, M.	·	1.8 km	MPC · JPL
423189	2004 NL_{15}	—	July 11, 2004	Socorro	LINEAR	JUN	1.2 km	MPC · JPL
423190	2004 NM_{18}	—	July 14, 2004	Socorro	LINEAR	·	2.1 km	MPC · JPL
423191	2004 NK_{19}	—	June 25, 2004	Kitt Peak	Spacewatch	·	1.7 km	MPC · JPL
423192	2004 NT_{22}	—	July 11, 2004	Socorro	LINEAR	·	1.3 km	MPC · JPL
423193	2004 NP_{24}	—	July 15, 2004	Socorro	LINEAR	·	1.9 km	MPC · JPL
423194	2004 OF_{15}	—	July 16, 2004	Cerro Tololo	M. W. Buie	·	1.8 km	MPC · JPL
423195	2004 PQ_{2}	—	August 6, 2004	Palomar	NEAT	MAR	1.3 km	MPC · JPL
423196	2004 PY_{12}	—	August 7, 2004	Palomar	NEAT	·	2.8 km	MPC · JPL
423197	2004 PA_{27}	—	August 10, 2004	Wrightwood	Vale, M.	·	1.2 km	MPC · JPL
423198	2004 PR_{30}	—	August 8, 2004	Socorro	LINEAR	MRX	1.2 km	MPC · JPL
423199	2004 PF_{35}	—	August 8, 2004	Anderson Mesa	LONEOS	·	2.0 km	MPC · JPL
423200	2004 PF_{47}	—	August 8, 2004	Palomar	NEAT	·	1.8 km	MPC · JPL

== 423201–423300 ==
back to top

Designation			Discovery			Properties		Ref
Permanent	Provisional	Named after	Date	Site	Discoverer(s)	Category	Diam.	Ref
423201	2004 PW_{68}	—	July 17, 2004	Socorro	LINEAR	JUN	1.2 km	MPC · JPL
423202	2004 PX_{76}	—	August 9, 2004	Socorro	LINEAR	·	2.3 km	MPC · JPL
423203	2004 QC_{28}	—	August 25, 2004	Kitt Peak	Spacewatch	·	1.5 km	MPC · JPL
423204	2004 QE_{28}	—	August 23, 2004	Kitt Peak	Spacewatch	·	1.5 km	MPC · JPL
423205 Echezeaux	2004 RS_{1}	Echezeaux	September 5, 2004	Vicques	M. Ory	·	2.9 km	MPC · JPL
423206	2004 RK_{6}	—	July 20, 2004	Siding Spring	SSS	·	2.4 km	MPC · JPL
423207	2004 RA_{8}	—	September 6, 2004	Vicques	M. Ory	·	1.9 km	MPC · JPL
423208	2004 RB_{55}	—	September 8, 2004	Socorro	LINEAR	·	2.1 km	MPC · JPL
423209	2004 RQ_{63}	—	September 8, 2004	Socorro	LINEAR	·	2.3 km	MPC · JPL
423210	2004 RD_{84}	—	September 10, 2004	Socorro	LINEAR	AMO	520 m	MPC · JPL
423211	2004 RO_{112}	—	September 6, 2004	Socorro	LINEAR	·	2.0 km	MPC · JPL
423212	2004 RJ_{119}	—	September 7, 2004	Kitt Peak	Spacewatch	·	1.3 km	MPC · JPL
423213	2004 RA_{138}	—	September 8, 2004	Palomar	NEAT	EUN	1.4 km	MPC · JPL
423214	2004 RJ_{140}	—	August 10, 2004	Socorro	LINEAR	·	2.1 km	MPC · JPL
423215	2004 RS_{145}	—	September 9, 2004	Socorro	LINEAR	·	1.8 km	MPC · JPL
423216	2004 RU_{154}	—	September 10, 2004	Socorro	LINEAR	DOR	2.1 km	MPC · JPL
423217	2004 RE_{158}	—	September 10, 2004	Socorro	LINEAR	·	1.9 km	MPC · JPL
423218	2004 RO_{176}	—	September 10, 2004	Socorro	LINEAR	·	1.7 km	MPC · JPL
423219	2004 RG_{189}	—	September 10, 2004	Socorro	LINEAR	DOR	2.4 km	MPC · JPL
423220	2004 RS_{191}	—	September 10, 2004	Socorro	LINEAR	·	1.8 km	MPC · JPL
423221	2004 RP_{201}	—	September 10, 2004	Kitt Peak	Spacewatch	·	2.1 km	MPC · JPL
423222	2004 RB_{204}	—	August 23, 2004	Kitt Peak	Spacewatch	·	570 m	MPC · JPL
423223	2004 RF_{205}	—	September 8, 2004	Palomar	NEAT	·	1.7 km	MPC · JPL
423224	2004 RV_{210}	—	September 11, 2004	Socorro	LINEAR	·	1.7 km	MPC · JPL
423225	2004 RR_{227}	—	September 9, 2004	Kitt Peak	Spacewatch	·	1.6 km	MPC · JPL
423226	2004 RT_{236}	—	September 10, 2004	Kitt Peak	Spacewatch	·	1.2 km	MPC · JPL
423227	2004 RE_{268}	—	September 11, 2004	Kitt Peak	Spacewatch	·	1.3 km	MPC · JPL
423228	2004 RU_{268}	—	September 11, 2004	Kitt Peak	Spacewatch	·	1.3 km	MPC · JPL
423229	2004 RV_{291}	—	September 10, 2004	Socorro	LINEAR	·	2.4 km	MPC · JPL
423230	2004 RD_{320}	—	September 13, 2004	Socorro	LINEAR	·	3.0 km	MPC · JPL
423231	2004 RU_{346}	—	September 11, 2004	Socorro	LINEAR	·	1.9 km	MPC · JPL
423232	2004 SY_{18}	—	September 18, 2004	Socorro	LINEAR	MAR	1.2 km	MPC · JPL
423233	2004 SS_{25}	—	September 22, 2004	Desert Eagle	W. K. Y. Yeung	AEO	1.3 km	MPC · JPL
423234	2004 SD_{32}	—	September 17, 2004	Socorro	LINEAR	·	2.2 km	MPC · JPL
423235	2004 SL_{36}	—	September 17, 2004	Kitt Peak	Spacewatch	·	1.6 km	MPC · JPL
423236	2004 SW_{47}	—	September 10, 2004	Socorro	LINEAR	·	2.2 km	MPC · JPL
423237	2004 SG_{55}	—	September 23, 2004	Kitt Peak	Spacewatch	·	1.5 km	MPC · JPL
423238	2004 TP_{28}	—	September 15, 2004	Socorro	LINEAR	MAR	1.1 km	MPC · JPL
423239	2004 TB_{35}	—	October 4, 2004	Kitt Peak	Spacewatch	·	1.6 km	MPC · JPL
423240	2004 TT_{62}	—	September 17, 2004	Kitt Peak	Spacewatch	·	1.9 km	MPC · JPL
423241	2004 TL_{78}	—	October 4, 2004	Socorro	LINEAR	·	2.3 km	MPC · JPL
423242	2004 TO_{87}	—	October 5, 2004	Kitt Peak	Spacewatch	·	2.3 km	MPC · JPL
423243	2004 TK_{88}	—	October 5, 2004	Kitt Peak	Spacewatch	·	2.7 km	MPC · JPL
423244	2004 TU_{136}	—	October 8, 2004	Anderson Mesa	LONEOS	·	860 m	MPC · JPL
423245	2004 TT_{140}	—	October 4, 2004	Kitt Peak	Spacewatch	(32418)	1.9 km	MPC · JPL
423246	2004 TP_{142}	—	September 22, 2004	Kitt Peak	Spacewatch	·	1.6 km	MPC · JPL
423247	2004 TB_{146}	—	October 5, 2004	Kitt Peak	Spacewatch	·	660 m	MPC · JPL
423248	2004 TJ_{148}	—	September 23, 2004	Kitt Peak	Spacewatch	·	1.4 km	MPC · JPL
423249	2004 TA_{154}	—	October 6, 2004	Kitt Peak	Spacewatch	HOF	2.3 km	MPC · JPL
423250	2004 TV_{165}	—	October 7, 2004	Kitt Peak	Spacewatch	AGN	1.1 km	MPC · JPL
423251	2004 TS_{183}	—	October 7, 2004	Kitt Peak	Spacewatch	WIT	1.0 km	MPC · JPL
423252	2004 TU_{194}	—	October 7, 2004	Kitt Peak	Spacewatch	·	2.5 km	MPC · JPL
423253	2004 TW_{195}	—	October 7, 2004	Kitt Peak	Spacewatch	·	670 m	MPC · JPL
423254	2004 TG_{206}	—	October 7, 2004	Kitt Peak	Spacewatch	·	660 m	MPC · JPL
423255	2004 TR_{206}	—	October 7, 2004	Kitt Peak	Spacewatch	·	2.3 km	MPC · JPL
423256	2004 TX_{273}	—	October 9, 2004	Kitt Peak	Spacewatch	·	750 m	MPC · JPL
423257	2004 TW_{276}	—	October 9, 2004	Kitt Peak	Spacewatch	·	2.2 km	MPC · JPL
423258	2004 TX_{282}	—	October 7, 2004	Palomar	NEAT	ADE	2.5 km	MPC · JPL
423259	2004 TF_{293}	—	October 10, 2004	Kitt Peak	Spacewatch	AGN	1.2 km	MPC · JPL
423260	2004 TP_{294}	—	October 10, 2004	Kitt Peak	Spacewatch	·	2.0 km	MPC · JPL
423261	2004 TO_{317}	—	October 11, 2004	Kitt Peak	Spacewatch	·	1.9 km	MPC · JPL
423262	2004 TJ_{325}	—	October 4, 2004	Kitt Peak	Spacewatch	AEO	1.2 km	MPC · JPL
423263	2004 TF_{326}	—	October 14, 2004	Kitt Peak	Spacewatch	·	1.4 km	MPC · JPL
423264	2004 TK_{334}	—	August 22, 2004	Kitt Peak	Spacewatch	·	2.3 km	MPC · JPL
423265	2004 TY_{339}	—	September 17, 2004	Kitt Peak	Spacewatch	AGN	1.0 km	MPC · JPL
423266	2004 VE_{8}	—	November 3, 2004	Kitt Peak	Spacewatch	·	630 m	MPC · JPL
423267	2004 VK_{12}	—	November 3, 2004	Palomar	NEAT	·	2.2 km	MPC · JPL
423268	2004 VC_{22}	—	November 4, 2004	Catalina	CSS	·	2.3 km	MPC · JPL
423269	2004 VX_{28}	—	November 8, 2004	Vicques	M. Ory	·	2.5 km	MPC · JPL
423270	2004 VU_{42}	—	October 15, 2004	Mount Lemmon	Mount Lemmon Survey	·	440 m	MPC · JPL
423271	2004 VF_{49}	—	November 4, 2004	Kitt Peak	Spacewatch	EOS	2.6 km	MPC · JPL
423272	2004 VU_{80}	—	November 4, 2004	Kitt Peak	Spacewatch	·	550 m	MPC · JPL
423273	2004 VA_{88}	—	November 11, 2004	Kitt Peak	Spacewatch	·	610 m	MPC · JPL
423274	2004 VM_{89}	—	November 11, 2004	Kitt Peak	Spacewatch	·	1.8 km	MPC · JPL
423275	2004 WG_{7}	—	October 15, 2004	Kitt Peak	Spacewatch	·	2.4 km	MPC · JPL
423276	2004 WW_{11}	—	November 17, 2004	Campo Imperatore	CINEOS	·	2.5 km	MPC · JPL
423277	2004 XG_{3}	—	December 3, 2004	Nashville	Clingan, R.	·	1.9 km	MPC · JPL
423278	2004 XU_{44}	—	December 7, 2004	Socorro	LINEAR	·	720 m	MPC · JPL
423279	2004 XS_{78}	—	December 10, 2004	Socorro	LINEAR	·	1.1 km	MPC · JPL
423280	2004 YU_{13}	—	December 18, 2004	Mount Lemmon	Mount Lemmon Survey	·	3.5 km	MPC · JPL
423281	2004 YN_{19}	—	December 19, 2004	Mount Lemmon	Mount Lemmon Survey	·	2.1 km	MPC · JPL
423282	2004 YE_{34}	—	December 18, 2004	Mount Lemmon	Mount Lemmon Survey	·	1.5 km	MPC · JPL
423283	2005 AH_{28}	—	January 10, 2005	Kitami	K. Endate	H	630 m	MPC · JPL
423284	2005 AR_{75}	—	January 15, 2005	Kitt Peak	Spacewatch	EOS	1.9 km	MPC · JPL
423285	2005 BM_{18}	—	January 16, 2005	Kitt Peak	Spacewatch	·	2.9 km	MPC · JPL
423286	2005 CE_{7}	—	February 2, 2005	Socorro	LINEAR	H	580 m	MPC · JPL
423287	2005 CR_{31}	—	February 1, 2005	Kitt Peak	Spacewatch	·	1.9 km	MPC · JPL
423288	2005 EB_{6}	—	March 1, 2005	Kitt Peak	Spacewatch	·	840 m	MPC · JPL
423289	2005 EO_{17}	—	March 3, 2005	Kitt Peak	Spacewatch	·	2.0 km	MPC · JPL
423290	2005 ER_{18}	—	March 3, 2005	Kitt Peak	Spacewatch	·	2.0 km	MPC · JPL
423291	2005 EE_{19}	—	March 3, 2005	Kitt Peak	Spacewatch	·	2.5 km	MPC · JPL
423292	2005 EN_{48}	—	March 3, 2005	Catalina	CSS	·	2.0 km	MPC · JPL
423293	2005 EZ_{50}	—	March 3, 2005	Catalina	CSS	·	2.5 km	MPC · JPL
423294	2005 EB_{63}	—	February 2, 2005	Kitt Peak	Spacewatch	THM	2.2 km	MPC · JPL
423295	2005 EU_{84}	—	March 4, 2005	Socorro	LINEAR	·	2.6 km	MPC · JPL
423296	2005 EO_{87}	—	March 4, 2005	Mount Lemmon	Mount Lemmon Survey	·	2.9 km	MPC · JPL
423297	2005 EG_{88}	—	March 8, 2005	Anderson Mesa	LONEOS	H	560 m	MPC · JPL
423298	2005 EW_{95}	—	March 11, 2005	Catalina	CSS	·	1 km	MPC · JPL
423299	2005 EM_{103}	—	March 4, 2005	Kitt Peak	Spacewatch	·	2.8 km	MPC · JPL
423300	2005 EV_{128}	—	March 9, 2005	Kitt Peak	Spacewatch	·	3.2 km	MPC · JPL

== 423301–423400 ==
back to top

Designation			Discovery			Properties		Ref
Permanent	Provisional	Named after	Date	Site	Discoverer(s)	Category	Diam.	Ref
423301	2005 EB_{139}	—	March 9, 2005	Mount Lemmon	Mount Lemmon Survey	·	3.3 km	MPC · JPL
423302	2005 EL_{142}	—	March 10, 2005	Catalina	CSS	·	710 m	MPC · JPL
423303	2005 EM_{146}	—	March 10, 2005	Mount Lemmon	Mount Lemmon Survey	EOS	1.8 km	MPC · JPL
423304	2005 EO_{148}	—	March 10, 2005	Kitt Peak	Spacewatch	·	2.5 km	MPC · JPL
423305	2005 EK_{151}	—	March 10, 2005	Kitt Peak	Spacewatch	·	3.6 km	MPC · JPL
423306	2005 EM_{160}	—	March 9, 2005	Mount Lemmon	Mount Lemmon Survey	·	710 m	MPC · JPL
423307	2005 EX_{179}	—	March 9, 2005	Kitt Peak	Spacewatch	·	600 m	MPC · JPL
423308	2005 EE_{182}	—	March 9, 2005	Socorro	LINEAR	·	2.0 km	MPC · JPL
423309	2005 EG_{192}	—	March 11, 2005	Mount Lemmon	Mount Lemmon Survey	·	600 m	MPC · JPL
423310	2005 EO_{219}	—	March 10, 2005	Mount Lemmon	Mount Lemmon Survey	·	3.4 km	MPC · JPL
423311	2005 EK_{227}	—	March 9, 2005	Mount Lemmon	Mount Lemmon Survey	·	630 m	MPC · JPL
423312	2005 EP_{233}	—	March 10, 2005	Anderson Mesa	LONEOS	·	1.2 km	MPC · JPL
423313	2005 EF_{238}	—	March 11, 2005	Kitt Peak	Spacewatch	EOS	2.1 km	MPC · JPL
423314	2005 EM_{239}	—	March 11, 2005	Kitt Peak	Spacewatch	·	3.0 km	MPC · JPL
423315	2005 EZ_{245}	—	March 12, 2005	Kitt Peak	Spacewatch	·	1.5 km	MPC · JPL
423316	2005 EZ_{259}	—	March 11, 2005	Kitt Peak	Spacewatch	·	660 m	MPC · JPL
423317	2005 EH_{261}	—	March 12, 2005	Mount Lemmon	Mount Lemmon Survey	(31811)	4.2 km	MPC · JPL
423318	2005 EV_{280}	—	March 10, 2005	Anderson Mesa	LONEOS	·	3.0 km	MPC · JPL
423319	2005 EG_{312}	—	March 10, 2005	Kitt Peak	M. W. Buie	·	1.9 km	MPC · JPL
423320	2005 EE_{315}	—	March 11, 2005	Kitt Peak	Spacewatch	·	2.4 km	MPC · JPL
423321	2005 ED_{318}	—	March 10, 2005	Anderson Mesa	LONEOS	AMO · PHA	200 m	MPC · JPL
423322	2005 FQ	—	March 16, 2005	Saint-Sulpice	Saint-Sulpice	·	2.8 km	MPC · JPL
423323	2005 FY_{1}	—	March 16, 2005	Mount Lemmon	Mount Lemmon Survey	·	3.8 km	MPC · JPL
423324	2005 FC_{5}	—	March 31, 2005	Kitt Peak	Spacewatch	·	1.1 km	MPC · JPL
423325	2005 GT_{9}	—	April 2, 2005	Siding Spring	R. H. McNaught	H	720 m	MPC · JPL
423326	2005 GY_{11}	—	April 1, 2005	Anderson Mesa	LONEOS	·	2.8 km	MPC · JPL
423327	2005 GV_{12}	—	April 1, 2005	Kitt Peak	Spacewatch	·	3.7 km	MPC · JPL
423328	2005 GK_{14}	—	April 2, 2005	Kitt Peak	Spacewatch	·	1.7 km	MPC · JPL
423329	2005 GR_{19}	—	April 2, 2005	Mount Lemmon	Mount Lemmon Survey	·	570 m	MPC · JPL
423330	2005 GG_{21}	—	April 3, 2005	Palomar	NEAT	·	1.3 km	MPC · JPL
423331	2005 GM_{24}	—	March 13, 2005	Kitt Peak	Spacewatch	EOS	2.0 km	MPC · JPL
423332	2005 GE_{34}	—	April 1, 2005	Kitt Peak	Spacewatch	THM	2.2 km	MPC · JPL
423333	2005 GW_{44}	—	April 5, 2005	Mount Lemmon	Mount Lemmon Survey	·	580 m	MPC · JPL
423334	2005 GH_{46}	—	April 5, 2005	Mount Lemmon	Mount Lemmon Survey	EOS	4.0 km	MPC · JPL
423335	2005 GL_{47}	—	April 5, 2005	Mount Lemmon	Mount Lemmon Survey	·	2.3 km	MPC · JPL
423336	2005 GJ_{53}	—	January 28, 2004	Kitt Peak	Spacewatch	THM	2.1 km	MPC · JPL
423337	2005 GQ_{56}	—	March 14, 2005	Mount Lemmon	Mount Lemmon Survey	·	840 m	MPC · JPL
423338	2005 GH_{69}	—	April 2, 2005	Catalina	CSS	PHO	980 m	MPC · JPL
423339	2005 GD_{71}	—	April 4, 2005	Kitt Peak	Spacewatch	·	640 m	MPC · JPL
423340	2005 GP_{73}	—	April 4, 2005	Mount Lemmon	Mount Lemmon Survey	LIX	3.6 km	MPC · JPL
423341	2005 GC_{133}	—	April 10, 2005	Kitt Peak	Spacewatch	·	2.6 km	MPC · JPL
423342	2005 GY_{135}	—	April 10, 2005	Kitt Peak	Spacewatch	·	2.3 km	MPC · JPL
423343	2005 GM_{140}	—	April 13, 2005	Socorro	LINEAR	·	720 m	MPC · JPL
423344	2005 GQ_{143}	—	April 10, 2005	Kitt Peak	Spacewatch	HYG	3.4 km	MPC · JPL
423345	2005 GB_{149}	—	April 2, 2005	Kitt Peak	Spacewatch	·	900 m	MPC · JPL
423346	2005 GR_{149}	—	April 11, 2005	Kitt Peak	Spacewatch	·	2.8 km	MPC · JPL
423347	2005 GQ_{150}	—	April 11, 2005	Kitt Peak	Spacewatch	·	730 m	MPC · JPL
423348	2005 GL_{157}	—	April 11, 2005	Kitt Peak	Spacewatch	·	3.7 km	MPC · JPL
423349	2005 GA_{168}	—	April 11, 2005	Kitt Peak	Spacewatch	·	2.5 km	MPC · JPL
423350	2005 GL_{168}	—	April 12, 2005	Kitt Peak	Spacewatch	·	660 m	MPC · JPL
423351	2005 GU_{178}	—	April 15, 2005	Siding Spring	SSS	·	5.3 km	MPC · JPL
423352	2005 GT_{180}	—	April 12, 2005	Kitt Peak	Spacewatch	·	3.5 km	MPC · JPL
423353	2005 GL_{210}	—	April 12, 2005	Anderson Mesa	LONEOS	·	4.4 km	MPC · JPL
423354	2005 HS_{6}	—	April 30, 2005	Socorro	LINEAR	H	590 m	MPC · JPL
423355	2005 HD_{10}	—	April 16, 2005	Kitt Peak	Spacewatch	·	2.3 km	MPC · JPL
423356	2005 JM_{1}	—	May 3, 2005	Kitt Peak	Spacewatch	·	3.9 km	MPC · JPL
423357	2005 JH_{3}	—	May 5, 2005	Needville	J. Dellinger, A. Lowe	·	1.9 km	MPC · JPL
423358	2005 JO_{12}	—	May 4, 2005	Mauna Kea	Veillet, C.	·	560 m	MPC · JPL
423359	2005 JF_{15}	—	May 2, 2005	Kitt Peak	Spacewatch	·	2.6 km	MPC · JPL
423360	2005 JP_{18}	—	May 4, 2005	Mount Lemmon	Mount Lemmon Survey	·	2.2 km	MPC · JPL
423361	2005 JE_{23}	—	May 2, 2005	Kitt Peak	Spacewatch	·	3.1 km	MPC · JPL
423362	2005 JZ_{28}	—	May 3, 2005	Kitt Peak	Spacewatch	VER	2.5 km	MPC · JPL
423363	2005 JF_{35}	—	May 4, 2005	Kitt Peak	Spacewatch	·	3.5 km	MPC · JPL
423364	2005 JP_{35}	—	May 4, 2005	Kitt Peak	Spacewatch	·	1.1 km	MPC · JPL
423365	2005 JY_{37}	—	April 14, 2005	Kitt Peak	Spacewatch	·	780 m	MPC · JPL
423366	2005 JH_{39}	—	May 7, 2005	Kitt Peak	Spacewatch	·	3.7 km	MPC · JPL
423367	2005 JL_{42}	—	May 8, 2005	Anderson Mesa	LONEOS	·	2.3 km	MPC · JPL
423368	2005 JN_{45}	—	May 7, 2005	Catalina	CSS	T_{j} (2.98)	5.1 km	MPC · JPL
423369	2005 JU_{46}	—	May 3, 2005	Kitt Peak	Spacewatch	NYS	670 m	MPC · JPL
423370	2005 JR_{49}	—	April 18, 2005	Kitt Peak	Spacewatch	·	3.5 km	MPC · JPL
423371	2005 JY_{50}	—	May 4, 2005	Kitt Peak	Spacewatch	·	2.7 km	MPC · JPL
423372	2005 JV_{55}	—	May 4, 2005	Kitt Peak	Spacewatch	·	4.0 km	MPC · JPL
423373	2005 JE_{56}	—	May 6, 2005	Kitt Peak	Spacewatch	·	2.7 km	MPC · JPL
423374	2005 JA_{57}	—	May 7, 2005	Kitt Peak	Spacewatch	·	620 m	MPC · JPL
423375	2005 JN_{63}	—	May 6, 2005	Catalina	CSS	·	3.8 km	MPC · JPL
423376	2005 JL_{69}	—	May 6, 2005	Kitt Peak	Spacewatch	·	4.1 km	MPC · JPL
423377	2005 JP_{80}	—	May 10, 2005	Kitt Peak	Spacewatch	·	3.3 km	MPC · JPL
423378	2005 JA_{83}	—	May 8, 2005	Kitt Peak	Spacewatch	·	2.8 km	MPC · JPL
423379	2005 JX_{84}	—	March 12, 2005	Mount Lemmon	Mount Lemmon Survey	·	2.7 km	MPC · JPL
423380 Juhászárpád	2005 JD_{94}	Juhászárpád	May 12, 2005	Piszkéstető	K. Sárneczky	·	1.0 km	MPC · JPL
423381	2005 JT_{96}	—	May 8, 2005	Kitt Peak	Spacewatch	EOS	2.7 km	MPC · JPL
423382	2005 JW_{102}	—	May 9, 2005	Catalina	CSS	·	3.7 km	MPC · JPL
423383	2005 JY_{102}	—	May 9, 2005	Catalina	CSS	·	4.0 km	MPC · JPL
423384	2005 JF_{112}	—	May 9, 2005	Socorro	LINEAR	·	820 m	MPC · JPL
423385	2005 JW_{120}	—	May 10, 2005	Kitt Peak	Spacewatch	·	3.7 km	MPC · JPL
423386	2005 JL_{121}	—	May 10, 2005	Kitt Peak	Spacewatch	·	910 m	MPC · JPL
423387	2005 JC_{126}	—	May 12, 2005	Palomar	NEAT	·	1.9 km	MPC · JPL
423388	2005 JA_{135}	—	May 14, 2005	Mount Lemmon	Mount Lemmon Survey	·	3.3 km	MPC · JPL
423389	2005 JS_{150}	—	May 3, 2005	Catalina	CSS	·	4.1 km	MPC · JPL
423390	2005 JL_{153}	—	May 4, 2005	Palomar	NEAT	·	3.5 km	MPC · JPL
423391	2005 JK_{156}	—	May 4, 2005	Mount Lemmon	Mount Lemmon Survey	·	3.3 km	MPC · JPL
423392	2005 JM_{176}	—	May 6, 2005	Kitt Peak	Spacewatch	·	2.7 km	MPC · JPL
423393	2005 JB_{178}	—	May 10, 2005	Mount Lemmon	Mount Lemmon Survey	·	650 m	MPC · JPL
423394	2005 KH_{2}	—	May 16, 2005	Mount Lemmon	Mount Lemmon Survey	·	2.4 km	MPC · JPL
423395	2005 KL_{3}	—	April 11, 2005	Kitt Peak	Spacewatch	EOS	2.0 km	MPC · JPL
423396	2005 KZ_{4}	—	May 18, 2005	Palomar	NEAT	PHO	1.0 km	MPC · JPL
423397	2005 KO_{9}	—	May 28, 2005	Reedy Creek	J. Broughton	·	990 m	MPC · JPL
423398	2005 LV_{6}	—	June 1, 2005	Kitt Peak	Spacewatch	MAS	730 m	MPC · JPL
423399	2005 LX_{9}	—	June 2, 2005	Catalina	CSS	·	1.0 km	MPC · JPL
423400	2005 LH_{10}	—	May 13, 2005	Kitt Peak	Spacewatch	·	3.2 km	MPC · JPL

== 423401–423500 ==
back to top

Designation			Discovery			Properties		Ref
Permanent	Provisional	Named after	Date	Site	Discoverer(s)	Category	Diam.	Ref
423401	2005 LN_{14}	—	June 5, 2005	Kitt Peak	Spacewatch	·	800 m	MPC · JPL
423402	2005 LY_{18}	—	June 8, 2005	Kitt Peak	Spacewatch	·	950 m	MPC · JPL
423403	2005 LM_{35}	—	May 16, 2005	Kitt Peak	Spacewatch	·	1.1 km	MPC · JPL
423404	2005 LV_{35}	—	June 11, 2005	Kitt Peak	Spacewatch	·	2.9 km	MPC · JPL
423405	2005 LT_{39}	—	June 13, 2005	Kitt Peak	Spacewatch	·	3.6 km	MPC · JPL
423406	2005 MK_{3}	—	June 24, 2005	Palomar	NEAT	·	1.0 km	MPC · JPL
423407	2005 MN_{5}	—	June 4, 2005	Kitt Peak	Spacewatch	L4	10 km	MPC · JPL
423408	2005 MB_{6}	—	June 24, 2005	Palomar	NEAT	·	3.9 km	MPC · JPL
423409	2005 MY_{15}	—	June 24, 2005	Palomar	NEAT	·	3.4 km	MPC · JPL
423410	2005 MH_{25}	—	June 27, 2005	Kitt Peak	Spacewatch	·	1.5 km	MPC · JPL
423411	2005 MQ_{25}	—	June 27, 2005	Kitt Peak	Spacewatch	·	1.7 km	MPC · JPL
423412	2005 MM_{31}	—	June 30, 2005	Palomar	NEAT	·	1.1 km	MPC · JPL
423413	2005 MS_{54}	—	June 20, 2005	Palomar	NEAT	·	2.2 km	MPC · JPL
423414	2005 NY_{1}	—	July 2, 2005	Kitt Peak	Spacewatch	·	1.1 km	MPC · JPL
423415	2005 NJ_{14}	—	July 5, 2005	Mount Lemmon	Mount Lemmon Survey	EUN	810 m	MPC · JPL
423416	2005 NV_{98}	—	July 10, 2005	Kitt Peak	Spacewatch	·	1.4 km	MPC · JPL
423417	2005 NJ_{102}	—	July 4, 2005	Catalina	CSS	PHO	1.7 km	MPC · JPL
423418	2005 NQ_{125}	—	July 10, 2005	Kitt Peak	Spacewatch	·	1.1 km	MPC · JPL
423419	2005 OJ_{20}	—	July 28, 2005	Palomar	NEAT	MAS	770 m	MPC · JPL
423420	2005 OJ_{31}	—	July 25, 2005	Siding Spring	SSS	PHO	1.1 km	MPC · JPL
423421	2005 PA_{9}	—	August 4, 2005	Palomar	NEAT	·	3.8 km	MPC · JPL
423422	2005 PG_{10}	—	August 4, 2005	Palomar	NEAT	·	900 m	MPC · JPL
423423	2005 PG_{16}	—	August 4, 2005	Palomar	NEAT	·	1.5 km	MPC · JPL
423424	2005 PJ_{16}	—	August 5, 2005	Palomar	NEAT	·	900 m	MPC · JPL
423425	2005 PL_{17}	—	August 6, 2005	Siding Spring	SSS	·	2.2 km	MPC · JPL
423426	2005 QM_{6}	—	August 24, 2005	Palomar	NEAT	·	4.0 km	MPC · JPL
423427	2005 QS_{6}	—	August 24, 2005	Palomar	NEAT	·	1.1 km	MPC · JPL
423428	2005 QM_{22}	—	August 27, 2005	Anderson Mesa	LONEOS	·	1.4 km	MPC · JPL
423429	2005 QK_{33}	—	August 25, 2005	Palomar	NEAT	·	1.0 km	MPC · JPL
423430	2005 QA_{34}	—	August 25, 2005	Palomar	NEAT	H	510 m	MPC · JPL
423431	2005 QW_{56}	—	August 29, 2005	Vail-Jarnac	Jarnac	(5)	1.1 km	MPC · JPL
423432	2005 QP_{63}	—	August 26, 2005	Palomar	NEAT	·	1.3 km	MPC · JPL
423433 Harsányi	2005 QL_{75}	Harsányi	August 29, 2005	Piszkéstető	K. Sárneczky, Z. Kuli	·	830 m	MPC · JPL
423434	2005 QE_{126}	—	August 28, 2005	Kitt Peak	Spacewatch	V	700 m	MPC · JPL
423435	2005 QP_{141}	—	August 30, 2005	Kitt Peak	Spacewatch	·	950 m	MPC · JPL
423436	2005 QZ_{180}	—	August 30, 2005	Campo Imperatore	CINEOS	(194)	1.4 km	MPC · JPL
423437	2005 QA_{190}	—	August 30, 2005	Kitt Peak	Spacewatch	·	1.3 km	MPC · JPL
423438	2005 QH_{190}	—	August 31, 2005	Kitt Peak	Spacewatch	PHO	1.1 km	MPC · JPL
423439	2005 RY_{18}	—	September 1, 2005	Kitt Peak	Spacewatch	NYS	1.1 km	MPC · JPL
423440	2005 RU_{44}	—	September 2, 2005	Palomar	NEAT	·	1.1 km	MPC · JPL
423441	2005 SR_{3}	—	September 23, 2005	Kitt Peak	Spacewatch	·	840 m	MPC · JPL
423442	2005 SB_{5}	—	September 22, 2005	Palomar	NEAT	·	1.3 km	MPC · JPL
423443	2005 SS_{12}	—	September 24, 2005	Kitt Peak	Spacewatch	·	1.2 km	MPC · JPL
423444	2005 SG_{23}	—	September 23, 2005	Catalina	CSS	·	1.3 km	MPC · JPL
423445	2005 ST_{39}	—	September 24, 2005	Kitt Peak	Spacewatch	·	1.1 km	MPC · JPL
423446	2005 SL_{48}	—	September 24, 2005	Kitt Peak	Spacewatch	·	1.2 km	MPC · JPL
423447	2005 SC_{69}	—	September 27, 2005	Kitt Peak	Spacewatch	ADE	2.0 km	MPC · JPL
423448	2005 SJ_{71}	—	September 18, 2005	Palomar	NEAT	JUN	1.2 km	MPC · JPL
423449	2005 SA_{87}	—	September 24, 2005	Kitt Peak	Spacewatch	·	970 m	MPC · JPL
423450	2005 SB_{92}	—	September 24, 2005	Kitt Peak	Spacewatch	·	1.1 km	MPC · JPL
423451	2005 SV_{93}	—	September 24, 2005	Kitt Peak	Spacewatch	·	1.1 km	MPC · JPL
423452	2005 SZ_{94}	—	September 25, 2005	Palomar	NEAT	·	1.0 km	MPC · JPL
423453	2005 SW_{102}	—	September 25, 2005	Kitt Peak	Spacewatch	·	1.4 km	MPC · JPL
423454	2005 SQ_{106}	—	September 26, 2005	Kitt Peak	Spacewatch	MAS	700 m	MPC · JPL
423455	2005 SV_{107}	—	September 26, 2005	Kitt Peak	Spacewatch	(5)	820 m	MPC · JPL
423456	2005 SO_{112}	—	September 26, 2005	Catalina	CSS	·	1.3 km	MPC · JPL
423457	2005 SO_{113}	—	September 27, 2005	Kitt Peak	Spacewatch	·	750 m	MPC · JPL
423458	2005 SK_{127}	—	September 29, 2005	Mount Lemmon	Mount Lemmon Survey	·	1.2 km	MPC · JPL
423459	2005 SH_{131}	—	September 29, 2005	Kitt Peak	Spacewatch	·	1.1 km	MPC · JPL
423460	2005 SO_{134}	—	September 29, 2005	Great Shefford	Birtwhistle, P.	·	1.1 km	MPC · JPL
423461	2005 SZ_{137}	—	September 25, 2005	Kitt Peak	Spacewatch	·	1.2 km	MPC · JPL
423462	2005 SY_{139}	—	September 25, 2005	Kitt Peak	Spacewatch	V	620 m	MPC · JPL
423463	2005 SB_{144}	—	September 25, 2005	Kitt Peak	Spacewatch	·	1.2 km	MPC · JPL
423464	2005 SU_{161}	—	September 27, 2005	Kitt Peak	Spacewatch	ADE	1.8 km	MPC · JPL
423465	2005 SL_{165}	—	September 14, 2005	Kitt Peak	Spacewatch	EUN	1.1 km	MPC · JPL
423466	2005 SO_{175}	—	September 29, 2005	Kitt Peak	Spacewatch	·	1.6 km	MPC · JPL
423467	2005 SU_{177}	—	September 24, 2005	Kitt Peak	Spacewatch	·	1.2 km	MPC · JPL
423468	2005 SE_{194}	—	September 29, 2005	Kitt Peak	Spacewatch	·	1.6 km	MPC · JPL
423469	2005 SW_{200}	—	September 30, 2005	Kitt Peak	Spacewatch	·	1.1 km	MPC · JPL
423470	2005 SN_{214}	—	September 30, 2005	Catalina	CSS	·	1.3 km	MPC · JPL
423471	2005 ST_{214}	—	September 30, 2005	Anderson Mesa	LONEOS	·	1.9 km	MPC · JPL
423472	2005 SN_{224}	—	September 29, 2005	Mount Lemmon	Mount Lemmon Survey	·	1.2 km	MPC · JPL
423473	2005 SN_{236}	—	September 29, 2005	Kitt Peak	Spacewatch	·	1.5 km	MPC · JPL
423474	2005 SS_{243}	—	September 30, 2005	Palomar	NEAT	·	2.3 km	MPC · JPL
423475	2005 SB_{246}	—	September 30, 2005	Mount Lemmon	Mount Lemmon Survey	·	1.0 km	MPC · JPL
423476	2005 SC_{250}	—	September 23, 2005	Catalina	CSS	·	1.1 km	MPC · JPL
423477	2005 SH_{271}	—	September 30, 2005	Mount Lemmon	Mount Lemmon Survey	·	1.2 km	MPC · JPL
423478	2005 SU_{273}	—	September 27, 2005	Kitt Peak	Spacewatch	·	1.1 km	MPC · JPL
423479	2005 SJ_{293}	—	September 23, 2005	Catalina	CSS	·	1.4 km	MPC · JPL
423480	2005 TK_{2}	—	October 1, 2005	Catalina	CSS	(5)	880 m	MPC · JPL
423481	2005 TL_{9}	—	October 1, 2005	Kitt Peak	Spacewatch	EUN	980 m	MPC · JPL
423482	2005 TR_{10}	—	October 2, 2005	Anderson Mesa	LONEOS	·	1.8 km	MPC · JPL
423483	2005 TZ_{15}	—	October 1, 2005	Kitt Peak	Spacewatch	·	800 m	MPC · JPL
423484	2005 TK_{16}	—	October 1, 2005	Kitt Peak	Spacewatch	3:2	4.2 km	MPC · JPL
423485	2005 TC_{17}	—	October 1, 2005	Socorro	LINEAR	·	1.4 km	MPC · JPL
423486	2005 TQ_{38}	—	October 1, 2005	Mount Lemmon	Mount Lemmon Survey	·	1.0 km	MPC · JPL
423487	2005 TM_{55}	—	October 6, 2005	Anderson Mesa	LONEOS	·	940 m	MPC · JPL
423488	2005 TJ_{59}	—	October 1, 2005	Mount Lemmon	Mount Lemmon Survey	·	1.4 km	MPC · JPL
423489	2005 TC_{60}	—	October 3, 2005	Kitt Peak	Spacewatch	·	1.2 km	MPC · JPL
423490	2005 TN_{71}	—	October 7, 2005	Mount Lemmon	Mount Lemmon Survey	NYS	1.2 km	MPC · JPL
423491	2005 TA_{81}	—	October 3, 2005	Kitt Peak	Spacewatch	EUN	1.0 km	MPC · JPL
423492	2005 TD_{110}	—	October 7, 2005	Kitt Peak	Spacewatch	·	1.7 km	MPC · JPL
423493	2005 TG_{111}	—	October 7, 2005	Kitt Peak	Spacewatch	·	840 m	MPC · JPL
423494	2005 TJ_{111}	—	September 27, 2005	Kitt Peak	Spacewatch	·	1.4 km	MPC · JPL
423495	2005 TU_{111}	—	September 27, 2005	Kitt Peak	Spacewatch	·	1.4 km	MPC · JPL
423496	2005 TM_{115}	—	October 7, 2005	Kitt Peak	Spacewatch	·	1.2 km	MPC · JPL
423497	2005 TQ_{120}	—	October 7, 2005	Kitt Peak	Spacewatch	·	970 m	MPC · JPL
423498	2005 TG_{122}	—	October 7, 2005	Kitt Peak	Spacewatch	·	1.6 km	MPC · JPL
423499	2005 TO_{149}	—	September 23, 2005	Kitt Peak	Spacewatch	·	1.0 km	MPC · JPL
423500	2005 TC_{150}	—	October 8, 2005	Kitt Peak	Spacewatch	·	820 m	MPC · JPL

== 423501–423600 ==
back to top

Designation			Discovery			Properties		Ref
Permanent	Provisional	Named after	Date	Site	Discoverer(s)	Category	Diam.	Ref
423501	2005 TQ_{150}	—	October 8, 2005	Kitt Peak	Spacewatch	·	780 m	MPC · JPL
423502	2005 TT_{158}	—	October 9, 2005	Kitt Peak	Spacewatch	·	850 m	MPC · JPL
423503	2005 TE_{166}	—	October 9, 2005	Kitt Peak	Spacewatch	·	1.2 km	MPC · JPL
423504	2005 TS_{176}	—	October 1, 2005	Anderson Mesa	LONEOS	·	1.2 km	MPC · JPL
423505	2005 TG_{186}	—	October 7, 2005	Kitt Peak	Spacewatch	·	1.2 km	MPC · JPL
423506	2005 TC_{189}	—	October 13, 2005	Kitt Peak	Spacewatch	·	1.2 km	MPC · JPL
423507	2005 TG_{193}	—	October 1, 2005	Mount Lemmon	Mount Lemmon Survey	·	1.2 km	MPC · JPL
423508	2005 TB_{197}	—	October 11, 2005	Kitt Peak	Spacewatch	·	1.2 km	MPC · JPL
423509	2005 UK_{17}	—	October 22, 2005	Kitt Peak	Spacewatch	·	1.3 km	MPC · JPL
423510	2005 UZ_{19}	—	October 22, 2005	Kitt Peak	Spacewatch	(194)	2.4 km	MPC · JPL
423511	2005 UX_{25}	—	October 23, 2005	Kitt Peak	Spacewatch	(5)	1.7 km	MPC · JPL
423512	2005 UM_{42}	—	October 22, 2005	Kitt Peak	Spacewatch	·	1.3 km	MPC · JPL
423513	2005 UZ_{51}	—	October 23, 2005	Catalina	CSS	·	1.2 km	MPC · JPL
423514	2005 UT_{54}	—	October 23, 2005	Catalina	CSS	·	1.5 km	MPC · JPL
423515	2005 UU_{58}	—	October 24, 2005	Kitt Peak	Spacewatch	MIS	2.3 km	MPC · JPL
423516	2005 UP_{60}	—	October 25, 2005	Mount Lemmon	Mount Lemmon Survey	·	1.2 km	MPC · JPL
423517	2005 UN_{64}	—	October 25, 2005	Catalina	CSS	·	1.0 km	MPC · JPL
423518	2005 UZ_{67}	—	October 22, 2005	Palomar	NEAT	·	1.9 km	MPC · JPL
423519	2005 UR_{69}	—	October 23, 2005	Catalina	CSS	·	1.0 km	MPC · JPL
423520	2005 UX_{73}	—	October 23, 2005	Palomar	NEAT	ADE	2.1 km	MPC · JPL
423521	2005 UA_{98}	—	October 22, 2005	Kitt Peak	Spacewatch	·	1.1 km	MPC · JPL
423522	2005 UX_{101}	—	October 22, 2005	Kitt Peak	Spacewatch	·	1.5 km	MPC · JPL
423523	2005 UR_{102}	—	October 22, 2005	Kitt Peak	Spacewatch	·	1.2 km	MPC · JPL
423524	2005 UL_{107}	—	October 22, 2005	Kitt Peak	Spacewatch	·	1.5 km	MPC · JPL
423525	2005 US_{113}	—	October 22, 2005	Kitt Peak	Spacewatch	·	2.0 km	MPC · JPL
423526	2005 UP_{122}	—	October 24, 2005	Kitt Peak	Spacewatch	·	1.1 km	MPC · JPL
423527	2005 US_{130}	—	October 24, 2005	Kitt Peak	Spacewatch	(5)	1.1 km	MPC · JPL
423528	2005 UF_{139}	—	October 25, 2005	Kitt Peak	Spacewatch	·	1.5 km	MPC · JPL
423529	2005 UP_{143}	—	October 25, 2005	Kitt Peak	Spacewatch	ADE	3.2 km	MPC · JPL
423530	2005 UO_{152}	—	October 26, 2005	Kitt Peak	Spacewatch	·	1.7 km	MPC · JPL
423531	2005 UQ_{158}	—	October 31, 2005	Junk Bond	D. Healy	NYS	1.2 km	MPC · JPL
423532	2005 UC_{169}	—	October 24, 2005	Kitt Peak	Spacewatch	MIS	1.7 km	MPC · JPL
423533	2005 US_{169}	—	October 24, 2005	Kitt Peak	Spacewatch	·	1.4 km	MPC · JPL
423534	2005 UR_{174}	—	October 24, 2005	Kitt Peak	Spacewatch	·	1.5 km	MPC · JPL
423535	2005 UJ_{177}	—	October 24, 2005	Kitt Peak	Spacewatch	·	980 m	MPC · JPL
423536	2005 UM_{193}	—	October 22, 2005	Kitt Peak	Spacewatch	·	860 m	MPC · JPL
423537	2005 UO_{195}	—	October 1, 2005	Kitt Peak	Spacewatch	·	1.6 km	MPC · JPL
423538	2005 UN_{205}	—	October 26, 2005	Kitt Peak	Spacewatch	·	1.1 km	MPC · JPL
423539	2005 UV_{207}	—	October 27, 2005	Kitt Peak	Spacewatch	·	1.2 km	MPC · JPL
423540	2005 UF_{228}	—	October 25, 2005	Kitt Peak	Spacewatch	·	1.2 km	MPC · JPL
423541	2005 UL_{230}	—	October 25, 2005	Kitt Peak	Spacewatch	·	1.9 km	MPC · JPL
423542	2005 UR_{240}	—	October 25, 2005	Kitt Peak	Spacewatch	·	1.3 km	MPC · JPL
423543	2005 UC_{245}	—	October 25, 2005	Kitt Peak	Spacewatch	ADE	2.3 km	MPC · JPL
423544	2005 UV_{249}	—	October 28, 2005	Mount Lemmon	Mount Lemmon Survey	EUN	1.1 km	MPC · JPL
423545	2005 UT_{266}	—	October 27, 2005	Kitt Peak	Spacewatch	·	1.1 km	MPC · JPL
423546	2005 UX_{273}	—	October 23, 2005	Catalina	CSS	·	1.7 km	MPC · JPL
423547	2005 UL_{276}	—	October 24, 2005	Kitt Peak	Spacewatch	·	900 m	MPC · JPL
423548	2005 UC_{282}	—	October 25, 2005	Mount Lemmon	Mount Lemmon Survey	·	1.5 km	MPC · JPL
423549	2005 UD_{294}	—	October 26, 2005	Kitt Peak	Spacewatch	·	1 km	MPC · JPL
423550	2005 UM_{298}	—	October 26, 2005	Kitt Peak	Spacewatch	·	1.2 km	MPC · JPL
423551	2005 UY_{309}	—	October 28, 2005	Mount Lemmon	Mount Lemmon Survey	·	1.7 km	MPC · JPL
423552	2005 UK_{313}	—	October 29, 2005	Catalina	CSS	EUN	1.2 km	MPC · JPL
423553	2005 UK_{323}	—	October 28, 2005	Catalina	CSS	EUN	1.1 km	MPC · JPL
423554	2005 UV_{330}	—	October 28, 2005	Kitt Peak	Spacewatch	·	1.5 km	MPC · JPL
423555	2005 UR_{350}	—	October 29, 2005	Catalina	CSS	·	1.7 km	MPC · JPL
423556	2005 UV_{351}	—	October 29, 2005	Catalina	CSS	·	2.5 km	MPC · JPL
423557	2005 UA_{353}	—	October 29, 2005	Catalina	CSS	·	1.6 km	MPC · JPL
423558	2005 UN_{354}	—	October 29, 2005	Catalina	CSS	EUN	1.4 km	MPC · JPL
423559	2005 UD_{357}	—	October 31, 2005	Mount Lemmon	Mount Lemmon Survey	·	1.3 km	MPC · JPL
423560	2005 UA_{386}	—	October 29, 2005	Mount Lemmon	Mount Lemmon Survey	KON	3.1 km	MPC · JPL
423561	2005 UP_{422}	—	October 27, 2005	Mount Lemmon	Mount Lemmon Survey	·	1.6 km	MPC · JPL
423562	2005 UB_{431}	—	October 28, 2005	Kitt Peak	Spacewatch	·	1.2 km	MPC · JPL
423563	2005 UF_{441}	—	October 29, 2005	Palomar	NEAT	·	1.7 km	MPC · JPL
423564	2005 UK_{457}	—	October 7, 2005	Anderson Mesa	LONEOS	·	1.5 km	MPC · JPL
423565	2005 UG_{469}	—	October 30, 2005	Kitt Peak	Spacewatch	·	1.1 km	MPC · JPL
423566	2005 UL_{480}	—	October 22, 2005	Palomar	NEAT	·	1.5 km	MPC · JPL
423567	2005 UD_{493}	—	October 25, 2005	Catalina	CSS	JUN	1.1 km	MPC · JPL
423568	2005 UF_{497}	—	July 6, 2005	Kitt Peak	Spacewatch	·	1.5 km	MPC · JPL
423569	2005 UX_{510}	—	October 26, 2005	Kitt Peak	Spacewatch	·	1.6 km	MPC · JPL
423570	2005 UE_{511}	—	October 27, 2005	Kitt Peak	Spacewatch	·	950 m	MPC · JPL
423571	2005 UM_{511}	—	October 27, 2005	Mount Lemmon	Mount Lemmon Survey	·	1.4 km	MPC · JPL
423572	2005 VF_{6}	—	November 6, 2005	Kitt Peak	Spacewatch	·	1.9 km	MPC · JPL
423573	2005 VH_{12}	—	October 27, 2005	Kitt Peak	Spacewatch	(5)	930 m	MPC · JPL
423574	2005 VM_{12}	—	September 30, 2005	Mount Lemmon	Mount Lemmon Survey	·	1.3 km	MPC · JPL
423575	2005 VF_{25}	—	October 27, 2005	Mount Lemmon	Mount Lemmon Survey	·	1.1 km	MPC · JPL
423576	2005 VX_{50}	—	November 3, 2005	Catalina	CSS	·	1.2 km	MPC · JPL
423577	2005 VK_{53}	—	November 3, 2005	Kitt Peak	Spacewatch	·	1.4 km	MPC · JPL
423578	2005 VC_{63}	—	November 1, 2005	Mount Lemmon	Mount Lemmon Survey	·	1.2 km	MPC · JPL
423579	2005 VZ_{75}	—	September 14, 2005	Catalina	CSS	·	1.3 km	MPC · JPL
423580	2005 VZ_{77}	—	October 27, 2005	Anderson Mesa	LONEOS	·	2.1 km	MPC · JPL
423581	2005 VS_{87}	—	October 29, 2005	Kitt Peak	Spacewatch	·	1.3 km	MPC · JPL
423582	2005 VE_{93}	—	November 6, 2005	Mount Lemmon	Mount Lemmon Survey	·	1.2 km	MPC · JPL
423583	2005 VJ_{94}	—	November 6, 2005	Mount Lemmon	Mount Lemmon Survey	(1547)	1.6 km	MPC · JPL
423584	2005 VR_{97}	—	November 5, 2005	Kitt Peak	Spacewatch	·	1.7 km	MPC · JPL
423585	2005 VV_{97}	—	November 5, 2005	Kitt Peak	Spacewatch	3:2	5.1 km	MPC · JPL
423586	2005 VO_{99}	—	November 1, 2005	Anderson Mesa	LONEOS	MAR	1.3 km	MPC · JPL
423587	2005 VK_{107}	—	November 5, 2005	Kitt Peak	Spacewatch	·	1.3 km	MPC · JPL
423588	2005 VJ_{109}	—	October 25, 2005	Kitt Peak	Spacewatch	·	1.8 km	MPC · JPL
423589	2005 VR_{110}	—	November 6, 2005	Mount Lemmon	Mount Lemmon Survey	·	1.3 km	MPC · JPL
423590	2005 VT_{110}	—	November 6, 2005	Kitt Peak	Spacewatch	·	2.2 km	MPC · JPL
423591	2005 VW_{110}	—	October 25, 2005	Kitt Peak	Spacewatch	·	1.6 km	MPC · JPL
423592	2005 VK_{113}	—	November 10, 2005	Kitt Peak	Spacewatch	·	1.9 km	MPC · JPL
423593	2005 VV_{135}	—	November 3, 2005	Kitt Peak	Spacewatch	·	1.0 km	MPC · JPL
423594	2005 VC_{136}	—	November 5, 2005	Mount Lemmon	Mount Lemmon Survey	·	1.3 km	MPC · JPL
423595	2005 WP_{6}	—	November 21, 2005	Catalina	CSS	·	1.2 km	MPC · JPL
423596	2005 WG_{8}	—	November 18, 2005	Palomar	NEAT	·	1.9 km	MPC · JPL
423597	2005 WP_{11}	—	November 22, 2005	Kitt Peak	Spacewatch	·	1.2 km	MPC · JPL
423598	2005 WW_{21}	—	November 21, 2005	Kitt Peak	Spacewatch	·	1.3 km	MPC · JPL
423599	2005 WM_{24}	—	November 21, 2005	Kitt Peak	Spacewatch	·	2.2 km	MPC · JPL
423600	2005 WS_{26}	—	November 21, 2005	Kitt Peak	Spacewatch	·	1.6 km	MPC · JPL

== 423601–423700 ==
back to top

Designation			Discovery			Properties		Ref
Permanent	Provisional	Named after	Date	Site	Discoverer(s)	Category	Diam.	Ref
423601	2005 WP_{28}	—	November 21, 2005	Kitt Peak	Spacewatch	3:2 · SHU	4.5 km	MPC · JPL
423602	2005 WJ_{31}	—	November 21, 2005	Kitt Peak	Spacewatch	·	1.5 km	MPC · JPL
423603	2005 WH_{32}	—	November 21, 2005	Kitt Peak	Spacewatch	ADE	2.4 km	MPC · JPL
423604	2005 WE_{34}	—	November 21, 2005	Kitt Peak	Spacewatch	·	2.5 km	MPC · JPL
423605	2005 WU_{34}	—	November 21, 2005	Kitt Peak	Spacewatch	·	1.1 km	MPC · JPL
423606	2005 WW_{34}	—	November 21, 2005	Kitt Peak	Spacewatch	·	1.2 km	MPC · JPL
423607	2005 WN_{41}	—	November 21, 2005	Kitt Peak	Spacewatch	EUN	930 m	MPC · JPL
423608	2005 WJ_{43}	—	November 21, 2005	Kitt Peak	Spacewatch	·	1.6 km	MPC · JPL
423609	2005 WS_{51}	—	November 25, 2005	Kitt Peak	Spacewatch	·	1.4 km	MPC · JPL
423610	2005 WW_{59}	—	November 26, 2005	Catalina	CSS	·	1.5 km	MPC · JPL
423611	2005 WZ_{68}	—	November 25, 2005	Mount Lemmon	Mount Lemmon Survey	·	1.5 km	MPC · JPL
423612	2005 WU_{77}	—	November 25, 2005	Kitt Peak	Spacewatch	·	1.6 km	MPC · JPL
423613	2005 WB_{88}	—	November 28, 2005	Mount Lemmon	Mount Lemmon Survey	·	1.4 km	MPC · JPL
423614	2005 WG_{94}	—	November 26, 2005	Kitt Peak	Spacewatch	·	1.6 km	MPC · JPL
423615	2005 WB_{100}	—	November 28, 2005	Catalina	CSS	·	1.3 km	MPC · JPL
423616	2005 WV_{118}	—	November 25, 2005	Kitt Peak	Spacewatch	·	1.4 km	MPC · JPL
423617	2005 WS_{134}	—	November 25, 2005	Mount Lemmon	Mount Lemmon Survey	(5)	1.3 km	MPC · JPL
423618	2005 WN_{137}	—	November 26, 2005	Mount Lemmon	Mount Lemmon Survey	·	1.8 km	MPC · JPL
423619	2005 WP_{139}	—	November 26, 2005	Mount Lemmon	Mount Lemmon Survey	·	2.3 km	MPC · JPL
423620	2005 WM_{141}	—	November 28, 2005	Mount Lemmon	Mount Lemmon Survey	·	2.4 km	MPC · JPL
423621	2005 WU_{152}	—	November 29, 2005	Kitt Peak	Spacewatch	·	1.3 km	MPC · JPL
423622	2005 WG_{155}	—	November 22, 2005	Kitt Peak	Spacewatch	GEF	1.5 km	MPC · JPL
423623	2005 WJ_{155}	—	November 29, 2005	Palomar	NEAT	·	1.9 km	MPC · JPL
423624 Udeantioquia	2005 WZ_{156}	Udeantioquia	November 27, 2005	Mérida	Ferrin, I.	·	1.8 km	MPC · JPL
423625	2005 WA_{165}	—	November 29, 2005	Mount Lemmon	Mount Lemmon Survey	·	1.5 km	MPC · JPL
423626	2005 WX_{168}	—	November 30, 2005	Kitt Peak	Spacewatch	·	1.3 km	MPC · JPL
423627	2005 WC_{172}	—	November 30, 2005	Mount Lemmon	Mount Lemmon Survey	·	1.4 km	MPC · JPL
423628	2005 WZ_{176}	—	November 30, 2005	Mount Lemmon	Mount Lemmon Survey	·	1.9 km	MPC · JPL
423629	2005 WB_{177}	—	November 30, 2005	Kitt Peak	Spacewatch	MIS	2.2 km	MPC · JPL
423630	2005 WF_{180}	—	November 21, 2005	Catalina	CSS	EUN	1.3 km	MPC · JPL
423631	2005 WH_{196}	—	October 30, 2005	Mount Lemmon	Mount Lemmon Survey	MRX	1.0 km	MPC · JPL
423632	2005 WW_{196}	—	October 25, 2005	Mount Lemmon	Mount Lemmon Survey	·	1.4 km	MPC · JPL
423633	2005 WU_{201}	—	November 29, 2005	Kitt Peak	Spacewatch	·	1.2 km	MPC · JPL
423634	2005 WP_{202}	—	November 30, 2005	Kitt Peak	Spacewatch	·	2.2 km	MPC · JPL
423635	2005 WR_{203}	—	November 20, 2005	Palomar	NEAT	·	1.9 km	MPC · JPL
423636	2005 WF_{208}	—	November 25, 2005	Kitt Peak	Spacewatch	·	1.5 km	MPC · JPL
423637	2005 XP	—	December 1, 2005	Mayhill	Mayhill	·	1.1 km	MPC · JPL
423638	2005 XU_{8}	—	December 1, 2005	Kitt Peak	Spacewatch	·	960 m	MPC · JPL
423639	2005 XW_{16}	—	December 1, 2005	Mount Lemmon	Mount Lemmon Survey	·	2.0 km	MPC · JPL
423640	2005 XV_{19}	—	December 2, 2005	Kitt Peak	Spacewatch	·	1.8 km	MPC · JPL
423641	2005 XW_{25}	—	December 4, 2005	Socorro	LINEAR	·	1.4 km	MPC · JPL
423642	2005 XP_{27}	—	December 1, 2005	Palomar	NEAT	·	1.1 km	MPC · JPL
423643	2005 XH_{39}	—	December 5, 2005	Mount Lemmon	Mount Lemmon Survey	·	1.4 km	MPC · JPL
423644	2005 XH_{60}	—	December 3, 2005	Kitt Peak	Spacewatch	·	1.2 km	MPC · JPL
423645 Quénisset	2005 YM_{4}	Quénisset	December 22, 2005	Nogales	J.-C. Merlin	MRX	810 m	MPC · JPL
423646	2005 YZ_{4}	—	December 21, 2005	Kitt Peak	Spacewatch	·	1.1 km	MPC · JPL
423647	2005 YP_{8}	—	December 23, 2005	Palomar	NEAT	(1547)	1.6 km	MPC · JPL
423648	2005 YD_{9}	—	December 21, 2005	Kitt Peak	Spacewatch	·	1.4 km	MPC · JPL
423649	2005 YB_{13}	—	December 22, 2005	Kitt Peak	Spacewatch	·	1.7 km	MPC · JPL
423650	2005 YY_{22}	—	November 28, 2005	Mount Lemmon	Mount Lemmon Survey	·	2.3 km	MPC · JPL
423651	2005 YW_{26}	—	December 22, 2005	Kitt Peak	Spacewatch	·	1.5 km	MPC · JPL
423652	2005 YY_{28}	—	December 24, 2005	Kitt Peak	Spacewatch	·	1.4 km	MPC · JPL
423653	2005 YF_{60}	—	December 22, 2005	Kitt Peak	Spacewatch	·	1.9 km	MPC · JPL
423654	2005 YE_{67}	—	December 26, 2005	Kitt Peak	Spacewatch	·	1.6 km	MPC · JPL
423655	2005 YA_{73}	—	December 8, 2005	Kitt Peak	Spacewatch	·	1.5 km	MPC · JPL
423656	2005 YA_{76}	—	December 24, 2005	Kitt Peak	Spacewatch	·	1.5 km	MPC · JPL
423657	2005 YK_{77}	—	December 24, 2005	Kitt Peak	Spacewatch	·	2.7 km	MPC · JPL
423658	2005 YP_{85}	—	December 25, 2005	Mount Lemmon	Mount Lemmon Survey	MIS	2.6 km	MPC · JPL
423659	2005 YG_{108}	—	December 25, 2005	Kitt Peak	Spacewatch	·	1.8 km	MPC · JPL
423660	2005 YA_{118}	—	December 2, 2005	Mount Lemmon	Mount Lemmon Survey	·	1.4 km	MPC · JPL
423661	2005 YR_{123}	—	December 24, 2005	Kitt Peak	Spacewatch	·	1.4 km	MPC · JPL
423662	2005 YY_{129}	—	December 24, 2005	Kitt Peak	Spacewatch	·	1.5 km	MPC · JPL
423663	2005 YH_{131}	—	December 25, 2005	Mount Lemmon	Mount Lemmon Survey	·	1.5 km	MPC · JPL
423664	2005 YQ_{134}	—	December 26, 2005	Kitt Peak	Spacewatch	·	2.2 km	MPC · JPL
423665	2005 YJ_{136}	—	December 26, 2005	Kitt Peak	Spacewatch	·	1.8 km	MPC · JPL
423666	2005 YJ_{138}	—	January 18, 2002	Cima Ekar	ADAS	·	2.3 km	MPC · JPL
423667	2005 YU_{142}	—	December 28, 2005	Mount Lemmon	Mount Lemmon Survey	·	1.6 km	MPC · JPL
423668	2005 YG_{144}	—	December 28, 2005	Mount Lemmon	Mount Lemmon Survey	·	1.8 km	MPC · JPL
423669	2005 YG_{149}	—	December 25, 2005	Kitt Peak	Spacewatch	·	1.2 km	MPC · JPL
423670	2005 YP_{175}	—	December 22, 2005	Kitt Peak	Spacewatch	·	2.2 km	MPC · JPL
423671	2005 YV_{185}	—	December 30, 2005	Kitt Peak	Spacewatch	·	2.4 km	MPC · JPL
423672	2005 YV_{186}	—	December 28, 2005	Mount Lemmon	Mount Lemmon Survey	·	1.3 km	MPC · JPL
423673	2005 YF_{187}	—	December 28, 2005	Kitt Peak	Spacewatch	·	1.4 km	MPC · JPL
423674	2005 YA_{189}	—	December 28, 2005	Mount Lemmon	Mount Lemmon Survey	·	3.3 km	MPC · JPL
423675	2005 YS_{189}	—	December 29, 2005	Kitt Peak	Spacewatch	MAR	880 m	MPC · JPL
423676	2005 YB_{192}	—	December 30, 2005	Kitt Peak	Spacewatch	·	1.7 km	MPC · JPL
423677	2005 YB_{197}	—	December 5, 2005	Mount Lemmon	Mount Lemmon Survey	·	1.2 km	MPC · JPL
423678	2005 YS_{198}	—	December 25, 2005	Kitt Peak	Spacewatch	·	2.6 km	MPC · JPL
423679	2005 YV_{212}	—	December 26, 2005	Kitt Peak	Spacewatch	·	2.2 km	MPC · JPL
423680	2005 YQ_{213}	—	December 29, 2005	Socorro	LINEAR	·	1.4 km	MPC · JPL
423681	2005 YJ_{218}	—	December 30, 2005	Kitt Peak	Spacewatch	GEF	1.5 km	MPC · JPL
423682	2005 YH_{229}	—	December 25, 2005	Mount Lemmon	Mount Lemmon Survey	·	2.3 km	MPC · JPL
423683	2005 YS_{240}	—	December 29, 2005	Kitt Peak	Spacewatch	·	1.5 km	MPC · JPL
423684	2005 YG_{246}	—	December 30, 2005	Kitt Peak	Spacewatch	·	1.5 km	MPC · JPL
423685	2005 YB_{252}	—	September 28, 2000	Anderson Mesa	LONEOS	EUN	1.7 km	MPC · JPL
423686	2005 YQ_{269}	—	December 26, 2005	Mount Lemmon	Mount Lemmon Survey	·	1.2 km	MPC · JPL
423687	2005 YE_{276}	—	December 5, 2005	Mount Lemmon	Mount Lemmon Survey	·	1.8 km	MPC · JPL
423688	2005 YG_{283}	—	December 27, 2005	Mount Lemmon	Mount Lemmon Survey	MRX	1.1 km	MPC · JPL
423689	2005 YP_{291}	—	December 27, 2005	Kitt Peak	Spacewatch	(5)	1.3 km	MPC · JPL
423690	2006 AZ_{4}	—	January 7, 2006	Junk Bond	D. Healy	·	2.0 km	MPC · JPL
423691	2006 AB_{16}	—	January 4, 2006	Kitt Peak	Spacewatch	·	1.4 km	MPC · JPL
423692	2006 AL_{16}	—	January 4, 2006	Mount Lemmon	Mount Lemmon Survey	·	3.0 km	MPC · JPL
423693	2006 AG_{26}	—	January 5, 2006	Kitt Peak	Spacewatch	·	1.4 km	MPC · JPL
423694	2006 AM_{31}	—	January 5, 2006	Anderson Mesa	LONEOS	·	2.2 km	MPC · JPL
423695	2006 AB_{33}	—	January 6, 2006	Socorro	LINEAR	EUN	1.5 km	MPC · JPL
423696	2006 AJ_{35}	—	January 4, 2006	Kitt Peak	Spacewatch	·	1.5 km	MPC · JPL
423697	2006 AC_{48}	—	December 30, 2005	Mount Lemmon	Mount Lemmon Survey	·	2.0 km	MPC · JPL
423698	2006 AK_{49}	—	January 5, 2006	Kitt Peak	Spacewatch	·	1.4 km	MPC · JPL
423699	2006 AQ_{49}	—	December 28, 2005	Mount Lemmon	Mount Lemmon Survey	MRX	1.1 km	MPC · JPL
423700	2006 AP_{50}	—	January 5, 2006	Kitt Peak	Spacewatch	·	1.7 km	MPC · JPL

== 423701–423800 ==
back to top

Designation			Discovery			Properties		Ref
Permanent	Provisional	Named after	Date	Site	Discoverer(s)	Category	Diam.	Ref
423701	2006 AW_{56}	—	January 7, 2006	Mount Lemmon	Mount Lemmon Survey	·	1.2 km	MPC · JPL
423702	2006 AD_{64}	—	January 7, 2006	Mount Lemmon	Mount Lemmon Survey	·	1.3 km	MPC · JPL
423703	2006 AV_{69}	—	January 6, 2006	Kitt Peak	Spacewatch	·	1.5 km	MPC · JPL
423704	2006 AG_{88}	—	January 5, 2006	Kitt Peak	Spacewatch	·	1.4 km	MPC · JPL
423705	2006 AV_{94}	—	January 8, 2006	Kitt Peak	Spacewatch	·	2.1 km	MPC · JPL
423706	2006 AB_{96}	—	January 10, 2006	Kitt Peak	Spacewatch	·	2.9 km	MPC · JPL
423707	2006 AJ_{104}	—	January 7, 2006	Mount Lemmon	Mount Lemmon Survey	·	2.8 km	MPC · JPL
423708	2006 BK_{3}	—	January 21, 2006	Kitt Peak	Spacewatch	MRX	980 m	MPC · JPL
423709	2006 BQ_{6}	—	January 22, 2006	Mount Lemmon	Mount Lemmon Survey	APO · PHA	400 m	MPC · JPL
423710	2006 BH_{29}	—	January 23, 2006	Mount Nyukasa	Japan Aerospace Exploration Agency	(5)	1.6 km	MPC · JPL
423711	2006 BJ_{35}	—	January 22, 2006	Mount Lemmon	Mount Lemmon Survey	·	2.3 km	MPC · JPL
423712	2006 BQ_{62}	—	January 25, 2006	Junk Bond	D. Healy	·	2.3 km	MPC · JPL
423713	2006 BB_{64}	—	January 22, 2006	Catalina	CSS	·	2.5 km	MPC · JPL
423714	2006 BR_{65}	—	January 23, 2006	Kitt Peak	Spacewatch	·	1.3 km	MPC · JPL
423715	2006 BZ_{69}	—	January 23, 2006	Kitt Peak	Spacewatch	·	2.2 km	MPC · JPL
423716	2006 BQ_{70}	—	January 23, 2006	Kitt Peak	Spacewatch	·	1.7 km	MPC · JPL
423717	2006 BP_{75}	—	January 23, 2006	Kitt Peak	Spacewatch	·	1.8 km	MPC · JPL
423718	2006 BL_{76}	—	January 23, 2006	Kitt Peak	Spacewatch	·	2.2 km	MPC · JPL
423719	2006 BR_{76}	—	January 23, 2006	Kitt Peak	Spacewatch	·	1.6 km	MPC · JPL
423720	2006 BO_{88}	—	January 25, 2006	Kitt Peak	Spacewatch	·	1.6 km	MPC · JPL
423721	2006 BH_{89}	—	January 25, 2006	Kitt Peak	Spacewatch	MRX	870 m	MPC · JPL
423722	2006 BJ_{96}	—	January 6, 2006	Mount Lemmon	Mount Lemmon Survey	·	1.6 km	MPC · JPL
423723	2006 BM_{105}	—	January 4, 2006	Kitt Peak	Spacewatch	·	1.3 km	MPC · JPL
423724	2006 BN_{111}	—	January 25, 2006	Kitt Peak	Spacewatch	·	2.5 km	MPC · JPL
423725	2006 BC_{117}	—	January 26, 2006	Kitt Peak	Spacewatch	·	2.7 km	MPC · JPL
423726	2006 BS_{117}	—	January 26, 2006	Mount Lemmon	Mount Lemmon Survey	·	2.6 km	MPC · JPL
423727	2006 BS_{132}	—	January 26, 2006	Kitt Peak	Spacewatch	·	1.8 km	MPC · JPL
423728	2006 BC_{135}	—	January 7, 2006	Mount Lemmon	Mount Lemmon Survey	·	2.0 km	MPC · JPL
423729	2006 BU_{136}	—	January 28, 2006	Mount Lemmon	Mount Lemmon Survey	·	1.5 km	MPC · JPL
423730	2006 BT_{156}	—	January 25, 2006	Kitt Peak	Spacewatch	·	2.3 km	MPC · JPL
423731	2006 BZ_{175}	—	January 27, 2006	Kitt Peak	Spacewatch	NEM	2.3 km	MPC · JPL
423732	2006 BR_{185}	—	January 28, 2006	Mount Lemmon	Mount Lemmon Survey	·	1.5 km	MPC · JPL
423733	2006 BJ_{186}	—	January 28, 2006	Mount Lemmon	Mount Lemmon Survey	·	2.6 km	MPC · JPL
423734	2006 BM_{194}	—	January 30, 2006	Kitt Peak	Spacewatch	(13314)	2.0 km	MPC · JPL
423735	2006 BR_{204}	—	January 31, 2006	Kitt Peak	Spacewatch	KOR	1.3 km	MPC · JPL
423736	2006 BP_{206}	—	January 31, 2006	Mount Lemmon	Mount Lemmon Survey	DOR	2.7 km	MPC · JPL
423737	2006 BS_{210}	—	January 31, 2006	Mount Lemmon	Mount Lemmon Survey	·	2.3 km	MPC · JPL
423738	2006 BM_{220}	—	January 30, 2006	Kitt Peak	Spacewatch	·	1.8 km	MPC · JPL
423739	2006 BE_{232}	—	January 31, 2006	Kitt Peak	Spacewatch	·	1.7 km	MPC · JPL
423740	2006 BD_{236}	—	January 31, 2006	Kitt Peak	Spacewatch	·	1.5 km	MPC · JPL
423741	2006 BH_{238}	—	January 23, 2006	Kitt Peak	Spacewatch	·	1.5 km	MPC · JPL
423742	2006 BX_{239}	—	January 31, 2006	Kitt Peak	Spacewatch	·	1.3 km	MPC · JPL
423743	2006 BE_{252}	—	January 31, 2006	Kitt Peak	Spacewatch	AGN	1.2 km	MPC · JPL
423744	2006 BB_{263}	—	January 25, 2006	Kitt Peak	Spacewatch	·	1.9 km	MPC · JPL
423745	2006 BC_{275}	—	January 26, 2006	Mount Lemmon	Mount Lemmon Survey	L5	9.4 km	MPC · JPL
423746	2006 BA_{277}	—	January 26, 2006	Mount Lemmon	Mount Lemmon Survey	·	1.7 km	MPC · JPL
423747	2006 CX	—	February 3, 2006	Catalina	CSS	AMO	580 m	MPC · JPL
423748	2006 CK_{4}	—	February 1, 2006	Mount Lemmon	Mount Lemmon Survey	·	2.6 km	MPC · JPL
423749	2006 CH_{18}	—	February 1, 2006	Mount Lemmon	Mount Lemmon Survey	·	2.2 km	MPC · JPL
423750	2006 CA_{46}	—	December 28, 2005	Kitt Peak	Spacewatch	·	1.4 km	MPC · JPL
423751	2006 CF_{47}	—	January 25, 2006	Kitt Peak	Spacewatch	·	1.8 km	MPC · JPL
423752	2006 DX_{5}	—	December 28, 2005	Mount Lemmon	Mount Lemmon Survey	·	1.9 km	MPC · JPL
423753	2006 DJ_{6}	—	February 20, 2006	Catalina	CSS	·	2.0 km	MPC · JPL
423754	2006 DT_{21}	—	February 20, 2006	Kitt Peak	Spacewatch	GEF	1.4 km	MPC · JPL
423755	2006 DK_{37}	—	February 20, 2006	Kitt Peak	Spacewatch	·	2.1 km	MPC · JPL
423756	2006 DZ_{43}	—	February 20, 2006	Kitt Peak	Spacewatch	·	3.4 km	MPC · JPL
423757	2006 DZ_{45}	—	February 20, 2006	Kitt Peak	Spacewatch	HOF	2.4 km	MPC · JPL
423758	2006 DJ_{47}	—	January 30, 2006	Kitt Peak	Spacewatch	·	1.9 km	MPC · JPL
423759	2006 DC_{49}	—	February 21, 2006	Catalina	CSS	·	2.5 km	MPC · JPL
423760	2006 DK_{61}	—	February 24, 2006	Kitt Peak	Spacewatch	·	1.9 km	MPC · JPL
423761	2006 DV_{70}	—	October 18, 2003	Kitt Peak	Spacewatch	·	3.0 km	MPC · JPL
423762	2006 DZ_{76}	—	February 24, 2006	Kitt Peak	Spacewatch	·	1.8 km	MPC · JPL
423763	2006 DR_{99}	—	February 25, 2006	Kitt Peak	Spacewatch	·	2.4 km	MPC · JPL
423764	2006 DP_{100}	—	February 25, 2006	Mount Lemmon	Mount Lemmon Survey	·	1.7 km	MPC · JPL
423765	2006 DZ_{107}	—	February 25, 2006	Kitt Peak	Spacewatch	ADE	2.1 km	MPC · JPL
423766	2006 DM_{113}	—	February 27, 2006	Kitt Peak	Spacewatch	(18466)	2.4 km	MPC · JPL
423767	2006 DE_{120}	—	January 26, 2006	Catalina	CSS	·	2.6 km	MPC · JPL
423768	2006 DJ_{131}	—	February 25, 2006	Kitt Peak	Spacewatch	NEM	2.6 km	MPC · JPL
423769	2006 DY_{143}	—	January 30, 2006	Kitt Peak	Spacewatch	·	1.8 km	MPC · JPL
423770	2006 DR_{145}	—	February 25, 2006	Mount Lemmon	Mount Lemmon Survey	MRX	960 m	MPC · JPL
423771	2006 DW_{146}	—	February 25, 2006	Kitt Peak	Spacewatch	·	1.6 km	MPC · JPL
423772	2006 DX_{151}	—	February 25, 2006	Kitt Peak	Spacewatch	·	1.8 km	MPC · JPL
423773	2006 DD_{152}	—	February 25, 2006	Kitt Peak	Spacewatch	BRA	1.3 km	MPC · JPL
423774	2006 DD_{159}	—	February 27, 2006	Kitt Peak	Spacewatch	·	2.3 km	MPC · JPL
423775	2006 DS_{172}	—	February 27, 2006	Kitt Peak	Spacewatch	EOS	1.7 km	MPC · JPL
423776	2006 DL_{195}	—	February 28, 2006	Socorro	LINEAR	·	2.2 km	MPC · JPL
423777	2006 DP_{210}	—	February 21, 2006	Mount Lemmon	Mount Lemmon Survey	·	2.4 km	MPC · JPL
423778	2006 EJ_{16}	—	March 2, 2006	Kitt Peak	Spacewatch	·	2.3 km	MPC · JPL
423779	2006 EN_{32}	—	March 3, 2006	Kitt Peak	Spacewatch	·	2.2 km	MPC · JPL
423780	2006 EZ_{43}	—	March 5, 2006	Mount Lemmon	Mount Lemmon Survey	·	2.0 km	MPC · JPL
423781	2006 EU_{44}	—	March 3, 2006	Catalina	CSS	ADE	3.6 km	MPC · JPL
423782	2006 EG_{73}	—	March 6, 2006	Kitt Peak	Spacewatch	·	1.9 km	MPC · JPL
423783	2006 EK_{73}	—	March 2, 2006	Kitt Peak	Spacewatch	·	1.9 km	MPC · JPL
423784	2006 FN_{1}	—	February 20, 2006	Kitt Peak	Spacewatch	·	1.8 km	MPC · JPL
423785	2006 FG_{3}	—	March 23, 2006	Kitt Peak	Spacewatch	·	2.0 km	MPC · JPL
423786	2006 FE_{8}	—	March 3, 2006	Mount Lemmon	Mount Lemmon Survey	·	4.4 km	MPC · JPL
423787	2006 FC_{43}	—	March 29, 2006	Kitt Peak	Spacewatch	·	2.4 km	MPC · JPL
423788	2006 GG_{11}	—	April 2, 2006	Kitt Peak	Spacewatch	·	2.3 km	MPC · JPL
423789	2006 GJ_{30}	—	March 23, 2006	Kitt Peak	Spacewatch	HYG	2.3 km	MPC · JPL
423790	2006 GY_{50}	—	April 2, 2006	Anderson Mesa	LONEOS	·	2.8 km	MPC · JPL
423791	2006 GZ_{50}	—	April 2, 2006	Anderson Mesa	LONEOS	·	2.4 km	MPC · JPL
423792	2006 HN_{3}	—	November 3, 2004	Kitt Peak	Spacewatch	·	1.0 km	MPC · JPL
423793	2006 HQ_{17}	—	April 18, 2006	Catalina	CSS	·	2.2 km	MPC · JPL
423794	2006 HP_{28}	—	April 20, 2006	Kitt Peak	Spacewatch	T_{j} (2.95)	4.2 km	MPC · JPL
423795	2006 HQ_{34}	—	April 19, 2006	Catalina	CSS	·	2.2 km	MPC · JPL
423796	2006 HX_{39}	—	April 21, 2006	Kitt Peak	Spacewatch	·	3.4 km	MPC · JPL
423797	2006 HT_{40}	—	April 21, 2006	Kitt Peak	Spacewatch	CLO	1.9 km	MPC · JPL
423798	2006 HU_{53}	—	April 19, 2006	Catalina	CSS	·	2.6 km	MPC · JPL
423799	2006 HH_{60}	—	April 26, 2006	Anderson Mesa	LONEOS	·	2.3 km	MPC · JPL
423800	2006 HP_{64}	—	April 24, 2006	Kitt Peak	Spacewatch	·	2.4 km	MPC · JPL

== 423801–423900 ==
back to top

Designation			Discovery			Properties		Ref
Permanent	Provisional	Named after	Date	Site	Discoverer(s)	Category	Diam.	Ref
423801	2006 HT_{66}	—	April 24, 2006	Kitt Peak	Spacewatch	·	2.7 km	MPC · JPL
423802	2006 HB_{74}	—	April 25, 2006	Kitt Peak	Spacewatch	·	2.5 km	MPC · JPL
423803	2006 HC_{84}	—	April 26, 2006	Kitt Peak	Spacewatch	·	2.6 km	MPC · JPL
423804	2006 HW_{91}	—	April 29, 2006	Kitt Peak	Spacewatch	·	650 m	MPC · JPL
423805	2006 HG_{94}	—	April 29, 2006	Kitt Peak	Spacewatch	·	1.9 km	MPC · JPL
423806	2006 HT_{101}	—	April 30, 2006	Kitt Peak	Spacewatch	·	1.8 km	MPC · JPL
423807	2006 HE_{105}	—	April 21, 2006	Catalina	CSS	·	2.3 km	MPC · JPL
423808	2006 HZ_{113}	—	April 25, 2006	Kitt Peak	Spacewatch	·	2.9 km	MPC · JPL
423809	2006 JN_{3}	—	May 2, 2006	Mount Lemmon	Mount Lemmon Survey	·	2.3 km	MPC · JPL
423810	2006 JQ_{30}	—	May 3, 2006	Mount Lemmon	Mount Lemmon Survey	·	2.1 km	MPC · JPL
423811	2006 JJ_{34}	—	May 4, 2006	Kitt Peak	Spacewatch	·	2.7 km	MPC · JPL
423812	2006 JZ_{34}	—	May 4, 2006	Kitt Peak	Spacewatch	·	1.9 km	MPC · JPL
423813	2006 JD_{44}	—	May 6, 2006	Kitt Peak	Spacewatch	(13314)	1.6 km	MPC · JPL
423814	2006 KO_{9}	—	April 30, 2006	Catalina	CSS	PHO	1.1 km	MPC · JPL
423815	2006 KH_{13}	—	May 20, 2006	Kitt Peak	Spacewatch	·	3.6 km	MPC · JPL
423816	2006 KA_{18}	—	May 21, 2006	Kitt Peak	Spacewatch	·	4.1 km	MPC · JPL
423817	2006 KG_{22}	—	May 20, 2006	Kitt Peak	Spacewatch	·	2.3 km	MPC · JPL
423818	2006 KM_{27}	—	May 20, 2006	Mount Lemmon	Mount Lemmon Survey	·	540 m	MPC · JPL
423819	2006 KW_{37}	—	May 9, 2006	Mount Lemmon	Mount Lemmon Survey	·	830 m	MPC · JPL
423820	2006 KY_{43}	—	May 21, 2006	Kitt Peak	Spacewatch	GEF	1.3 km	MPC · JPL
423821	2006 KD_{48}	—	May 8, 2006	Kitt Peak	Spacewatch	·	770 m	MPC · JPL
423822	2006 KQ_{57}	—	May 9, 2006	Mount Lemmon	Mount Lemmon Survey	·	2.9 km	MPC · JPL
423823	2006 KN_{74}	—	May 23, 2006	Kitt Peak	Spacewatch	EOS	2.4 km	MPC · JPL
423824	2006 KW_{83}	—	May 21, 2006	Mount Lemmon	Mount Lemmon Survey	·	1.5 km	MPC · JPL
423825	2006 KF_{119}	—	May 31, 2006	Kitt Peak	Spacewatch	·	2.9 km	MPC · JPL
423826	2006 KM_{119}	—	May 31, 2006	Kitt Peak	Spacewatch	·	1.8 km	MPC · JPL
423827	2006 MZ_{4}	—	May 30, 2006	Mount Lemmon	Mount Lemmon Survey	·	2.9 km	MPC · JPL
423828	2006 MF_{6}	—	May 24, 2006	Mount Lemmon	Mount Lemmon Survey	·	3.0 km	MPC · JPL
423829	2006 ME_{10}	—	June 17, 2006	Kitt Peak	Spacewatch	·	710 m	MPC · JPL
423830	2006 MN_{10}	—	May 24, 2006	Mount Lemmon	Mount Lemmon Survey	·	2.8 km	MPC · JPL
423831	2006 OY_{2}	—	July 17, 2006	Eskridge	Farpoint	MAS	740 m	MPC · JPL
423832	2006 OO_{7}	—	July 18, 2006	Mount Lemmon	Mount Lemmon Survey	MAS	700 m	MPC · JPL
423833	2006 OH_{11}	—	July 20, 2006	Palomar	NEAT	·	6.1 km	MPC · JPL
423834	2006 OK_{11}	—	July 20, 2006	Palomar	NEAT	·	1.8 km	MPC · JPL
423835	2006 PT_{2}	—	August 12, 2006	Palomar	NEAT	·	1.2 km	MPC · JPL
423836	2006 PD_{17}	—	August 15, 2006	Palomar	NEAT	PHO	860 m	MPC · JPL
423837	2006 PO_{21}	—	August 15, 2006	Palomar	NEAT	CYB	6.1 km	MPC · JPL
423838	2006 QZ_{7}	—	August 19, 2006	Kitt Peak	Spacewatch	·	700 m	MPC · JPL
423839	2006 QS_{16}	—	August 17, 2006	Palomar	NEAT	·	4.4 km	MPC · JPL
423840	2006 QM_{25}	—	August 18, 2006	Kitt Peak	Spacewatch	·	610 m	MPC · JPL
423841	2006 QR_{25}	—	August 18, 2006	Kitt Peak	Spacewatch	NYS	1.2 km	MPC · JPL
423842	2006 QK_{32}	—	August 20, 2006	Kitt Peak	Spacewatch	·	1.0 km	MPC · JPL
423843	2006 QW_{43}	—	August 19, 2006	Anderson Mesa	LONEOS	·	4.8 km	MPC · JPL
423844	2006 QZ_{45}	—	August 19, 2006	Palomar	NEAT	·	1.9 km	MPC · JPL
423845	2006 QY_{61}	—	July 25, 2006	Mount Lemmon	Mount Lemmon Survey	·	1 km	MPC · JPL
423846	2006 QO_{64}	—	August 27, 2006	Kitt Peak	Spacewatch	MAS	680 m	MPC · JPL
423847	2006 QS_{64}	—	August 27, 2006	Kitt Peak	Spacewatch	MAS	670 m	MPC · JPL
423848	2006 QS_{72}	—	August 21, 2006	Kitt Peak	Spacewatch	·	1.1 km	MPC · JPL
423849	2006 QP_{93}	—	August 16, 2006	Palomar	NEAT	TIR	4.4 km	MPC · JPL
423850	2006 QS_{94}	—	August 16, 2006	Palomar	NEAT	·	3.6 km	MPC · JPL
423851	2006 QN_{96}	—	August 16, 2006	Palomar	NEAT	·	1.0 km	MPC · JPL
423852	2006 QW_{115}	—	August 29, 2006	Catalina	CSS	·	890 m	MPC · JPL
423853	2006 QB_{118}	—	August 27, 2006	Anderson Mesa	LONEOS	ERI	1.8 km	MPC · JPL
423854	2006 QM_{130}	—	August 20, 2006	Palomar	NEAT	NYS	950 m	MPC · JPL
423855	2006 QG_{133}	—	August 23, 2006	Palomar	NEAT	·	1.6 km	MPC · JPL
423856	2006 QL_{138}	—	August 16, 2006	Palomar	NEAT	·	690 m	MPC · JPL
423857	2006 QN_{145}	—	August 18, 2006	Kitt Peak	Spacewatch	·	3.2 km	MPC · JPL
423858	2006 QY_{162}	—	August 21, 2006	Kitt Peak	Spacewatch	·	4.7 km	MPC · JPL
423859	2006 QU_{164}	—	August 29, 2006	Anderson Mesa	LONEOS	·	1.3 km	MPC · JPL
423860	2006 QQ_{170}	—	August 19, 2006	Kitt Peak	Spacewatch	·	1.0 km	MPC · JPL
423861	2006 RD_{2}	—	September 14, 2006	Catalina	CSS	·	1.4 km	MPC · JPL
423862	2006 RR_{3}	—	August 29, 2006	Anderson Mesa	LONEOS	PHO	1.0 km	MPC · JPL
423863	2006 RP_{14}	—	September 14, 2006	Kitt Peak	Spacewatch	·	820 m	MPC · JPL
423864	2006 RJ_{15}	—	September 14, 2006	Palomar	NEAT	·	3.8 km	MPC · JPL
423865	2006 RU_{19}	—	August 29, 2006	Catalina	CSS	·	970 m	MPC · JPL
423866	2006 RR_{21}	—	September 15, 2006	Kitt Peak	Spacewatch	·	4.9 km	MPC · JPL
423867	2006 RV_{26}	—	September 14, 2006	Kitt Peak	Spacewatch	·	1.0 km	MPC · JPL
423868	2006 RL_{29}	—	September 15, 2006	Kitt Peak	Spacewatch	·	1.0 km	MPC · JPL
423869	2006 RY_{31}	—	September 15, 2006	Kitt Peak	Spacewatch	·	930 m	MPC · JPL
423870	2006 RD_{34}	—	August 28, 2006	Anderson Mesa	LONEOS	NYS	1.2 km	MPC · JPL
423871	2006 RF_{34}	—	September 12, 2006	Catalina	CSS	·	710 m	MPC · JPL
423872	2006 RN_{43}	—	September 14, 2006	Kitt Peak	Spacewatch	NYS	1.0 km	MPC · JPL
423873	2006 RO_{45}	—	September 14, 2006	Kitt Peak	Spacewatch	CYB	3.3 km	MPC · JPL
423874	2006 RZ_{45}	—	September 14, 2006	Kitt Peak	Spacewatch	·	720 m	MPC · JPL
423875	2006 RC_{50}	—	September 17, 1995	Kitt Peak	Spacewatch	·	3.1 km	MPC · JPL
423876	2006 RA_{57}	—	September 14, 2006	Catalina	CSS	·	1.3 km	MPC · JPL
423877	2006 RP_{65}	—	August 27, 2006	Anderson Mesa	LONEOS	·	990 m	MPC · JPL
423878	2006 RG_{68}	—	September 15, 2006	Kitt Peak	Spacewatch	·	3.9 km	MPC · JPL
423879	2006 RS_{76}	—	September 15, 2006	Kitt Peak	Spacewatch	·	770 m	MPC · JPL
423880	2006 RU_{77}	—	September 15, 2006	Kitt Peak	Spacewatch	·	880 m	MPC · JPL
423881	2006 RN_{85}	—	September 15, 2006	Kitt Peak	Spacewatch	·	1.0 km	MPC · JPL
423882	2006 RR_{85}	—	September 15, 2006	Kitt Peak	Spacewatch	·	860 m	MPC · JPL
423883	2006 RO_{91}	—	September 15, 2006	Kitt Peak	Spacewatch	NYS	950 m	MPC · JPL
423884	2006 RQ_{96}	—	September 15, 2006	Kitt Peak	Spacewatch	NYS	880 m	MPC · JPL
423885	2006 RY_{96}	—	September 15, 2006	Kitt Peak	Spacewatch	NYS	1.0 km	MPC · JPL
423886	2006 RR_{102}	—	September 14, 2006	Kitt Peak	Spacewatch	·	1.2 km	MPC · JPL
423887	2006 SN_{29}	—	September 17, 2006	Kitt Peak	Spacewatch	(1118)	4.4 km	MPC · JPL
423888	2006 SV_{33}	—	September 17, 2006	Catalina	CSS	·	1.5 km	MPC · JPL
423889	2006 SG_{37}	—	September 17, 2006	Kitt Peak	Spacewatch	·	900 m	MPC · JPL
423890	2006 ST_{40}	—	September 18, 2006	Catalina	CSS	·	930 m	MPC · JPL
423891	2006 SM_{43}	—	August 21, 2006	Kitt Peak	Spacewatch	V	550 m	MPC · JPL
423892	2006 SS_{58}	—	September 20, 2006	Kitt Peak	Spacewatch	·	3.9 km	MPC · JPL
423893	2006 SL_{62}	—	September 18, 2006	Anderson Mesa	LONEOS	NYS	1.2 km	MPC · JPL
423894	2006 SS_{62}	—	September 18, 2006	Catalina	CSS	·	1.4 km	MPC · JPL
423895	2006 SX_{68}	—	September 15, 2006	Kitt Peak	Spacewatch	·	2.6 km	MPC · JPL
423896	2006 SW_{89}	—	September 18, 2006	Kitt Peak	Spacewatch	·	930 m	MPC · JPL
423897	2006 SK_{94}	—	September 18, 2006	Kitt Peak	Spacewatch	·	1.0 km	MPC · JPL
423898	2006 SN_{139}	—	September 21, 2006	Anderson Mesa	LONEOS	·	1.5 km	MPC · JPL
423899	2006 SQ_{192}	—	September 26, 2006	Mount Lemmon	Mount Lemmon Survey	·	890 m	MPC · JPL
423900	2006 SW_{200}	—	September 24, 2006	Kitt Peak	Spacewatch	MAS	640 m	MPC · JPL

== 423901–424000 ==
back to top

Designation			Discovery			Properties		Ref
Permanent	Provisional	Named after	Date	Site	Discoverer(s)	Category	Diam.	Ref
423901	2006 SL_{208}	—	September 26, 2006	Socorro	LINEAR	MAS	680 m	MPC · JPL
423902	2006 SR_{227}	—	September 26, 2006	Kitt Peak	Spacewatch	·	1.1 km	MPC · JPL
423903	2006 SM_{231}	—	September 26, 2006	Kitt Peak	Spacewatch	·	1.0 km	MPC · JPL
423904	2006 SV_{242}	—	April 2, 2005	Mount Lemmon	Mount Lemmon Survey	·	1.2 km	MPC · JPL
423905	2006 SO_{244}	—	September 26, 2006	Kitt Peak	Spacewatch	·	4.0 km	MPC · JPL
423906	2006 SO_{275}	—	September 27, 2006	Mount Lemmon	Mount Lemmon Survey	·	1.3 km	MPC · JPL
423907	2006 SO_{286}	—	September 19, 2006	Catalina	CSS	·	1.9 km	MPC · JPL
423908	2006 SE_{298}	—	September 25, 2006	Mount Lemmon	Mount Lemmon Survey	MAS	630 m	MPC · JPL
423909	2006 SC_{300}	—	September 19, 2006	Catalina	CSS	·	1.3 km	MPC · JPL
423910	2006 SN_{304}	—	September 27, 2006	Kitt Peak	Spacewatch	·	1.0 km	MPC · JPL
423911	2006 SB_{316}	—	October 20, 1995	Kitt Peak	Spacewatch	MAS	550 m	MPC · JPL
423912	2006 SX_{317}	—	September 27, 2006	Kitt Peak	Spacewatch	·	1.0 km	MPC · JPL
423913	2006 SY_{323}	—	September 27, 2006	Kitt Peak	Spacewatch	·	830 m	MPC · JPL
423914	2006 SL_{326}	—	September 27, 2006	Kitt Peak	Spacewatch	·	840 m	MPC · JPL
423915	2006 SC_{333}	—	September 14, 2006	Kitt Peak	Spacewatch	MAS	660 m	MPC · JPL
423916	2006 SX_{335}	—	September 18, 2006	Catalina	CSS	·	800 m	MPC · JPL
423917	2006 SS_{339}	—	September 28, 2006	Kitt Peak	Spacewatch	V	670 m	MPC · JPL
423918	2006 SS_{350}	—	August 21, 2006	Kitt Peak	Spacewatch	·	1.1 km	MPC · JPL
423919	2006 SJ_{355}	—	September 30, 2006	Mount Lemmon	Mount Lemmon Survey	·	1.3 km	MPC · JPL
423920	2006 SX_{357}	—	September 30, 2006	Mount Lemmon	Mount Lemmon Survey	V	490 m	MPC · JPL
423921	2006 SU_{361}	—	September 30, 2006	Mount Lemmon	Mount Lemmon Survey	·	1.3 km	MPC · JPL
423922	2006 SX_{392}	—	September 27, 2006	Mount Lemmon	Mount Lemmon Survey	MAS	720 m	MPC · JPL
423923	2006 SW_{395}	—	September 17, 2006	Mauna Kea	Masiero, J.	·	580 m	MPC · JPL
423924	2006 SH_{396}	—	September 17, 2006	Kitt Peak	Spacewatch	·	720 m	MPC · JPL
423925	2006 SB_{397}	—	January 30, 2004	Kitt Peak	Spacewatch	·	790 m	MPC · JPL
423926	2006 SL_{403}	—	September 27, 2006	Mount Lemmon	Mount Lemmon Survey	·	910 m	MPC · JPL
423927	2006 SD_{406}	—	September 18, 2006	Kitt Peak	Spacewatch	·	2.9 km	MPC · JPL
423928	2006 SB_{413}	—	September 19, 2006	Catalina	CSS	·	1.5 km	MPC · JPL
423929	2006 TK_{1}	—	September 18, 2006	Catalina	CSS	·	810 m	MPC · JPL
423930	2006 TV_{16}	—	September 18, 2006	Kitt Peak	Spacewatch	·	910 m	MPC · JPL
423931	2006 TW_{30}	—	September 25, 2006	Mount Lemmon	Mount Lemmon Survey	NYS	1.0 km	MPC · JPL
423932	2006 TP_{44}	—	October 12, 2006	Kitt Peak	Spacewatch	·	900 m	MPC · JPL
423933	2006 TS_{44}	—	October 12, 2006	Kitt Peak	Spacewatch	·	1.1 km	MPC · JPL
423934	2006 TA_{75}	—	October 11, 2006	Palomar	NEAT	·	1.1 km	MPC · JPL
423935	2006 TC_{80}	—	October 13, 2006	Kitt Peak	Spacewatch	V	680 m	MPC · JPL
423936	2006 TD_{82}	—	October 4, 2006	Mount Lemmon	Mount Lemmon Survey	·	1.2 km	MPC · JPL
423937	2006 TV_{102}	—	October 15, 2006	Kitt Peak	Spacewatch	·	3.0 km	MPC · JPL
423938	2006 TP_{117}	—	October 3, 2006	Apache Point	A. C. Becker	·	3.0 km	MPC · JPL
423939	2006 TP_{124}	—	October 3, 2006	Mount Lemmon	Mount Lemmon Survey	V	610 m	MPC · JPL
423940	2006 TQ_{125}	—	October 13, 2006	Kitt Peak	Spacewatch	·	860 m	MPC · JPL
423941	2006 TH_{126}	—	October 3, 2006	Mount Lemmon	Mount Lemmon Survey	VER	2.6 km	MPC · JPL
423942	2006 TV_{127}	—	October 12, 2006	Kitt Peak	Spacewatch	·	960 m	MPC · JPL
423943	2006 TZ_{129}	—	October 2, 2006	Mount Lemmon	Mount Lemmon Survey	·	1.3 km	MPC · JPL
423944	2006 UX_{3}	—	October 17, 2006	Mount Lemmon	Mount Lemmon Survey	NYS	1.3 km	MPC · JPL
423945	2006 UK_{5}	—	September 30, 2006	Mount Lemmon	Mount Lemmon Survey	NYS	990 m	MPC · JPL
423946	2006 UX_{7}	—	October 16, 2006	Catalina	CSS	·	1.3 km	MPC · JPL
423947	2006 UC_{8}	—	October 2, 2006	Mount Lemmon	Mount Lemmon Survey	·	1.0 km	MPC · JPL
423948	2006 UX_{15}	—	October 17, 2006	Mount Lemmon	Mount Lemmon Survey	·	1.0 km	MPC · JPL
423949	2006 UR_{18}	—	September 25, 2006	Kitt Peak	Spacewatch	·	1.0 km	MPC · JPL
423950	2006 UB_{22}	—	September 25, 2006	Kitt Peak	Spacewatch	·	1.0 km	MPC · JPL
423951	2006 UY_{30}	—	October 2, 2006	Mount Lemmon	Mount Lemmon Survey	H	430 m	MPC · JPL
423952	2006 UO_{49}	—	October 17, 2006	Catalina	CSS	MAS	610 m	MPC · JPL
423953	2006 UJ_{59}	—	October 19, 2006	Kitt Peak	Spacewatch	CLA	1.6 km	MPC · JPL
423954	2006 UC_{61}	—	October 19, 2006	Kitt Peak	Spacewatch	·	870 m	MPC · JPL
423955	2006 UN_{72}	—	October 17, 2006	Catalina	CSS	·	940 m	MPC · JPL
423956	2006 UF_{75}	—	October 17, 2006	Goodricke-Pigott	R. A. Tucker	·	1.5 km	MPC · JPL
423957	2006 UM_{80}	—	October 17, 2006	Mount Lemmon	Mount Lemmon Survey	MAS	770 m	MPC · JPL
423958	2006 UB_{88}	—	October 17, 2006	Kitt Peak	Spacewatch	·	1.1 km	MPC · JPL
423959	2006 UU_{97}	—	October 18, 2006	Kitt Peak	Spacewatch	NYS	1.1 km	MPC · JPL
423960	2006 US_{102}	—	October 18, 2006	Kitt Peak	Spacewatch	·	1.5 km	MPC · JPL
423961	2006 UG_{107}	—	October 18, 2006	Kitt Peak	Spacewatch	NYS	1.3 km	MPC · JPL
423962	2006 UD_{115}	—	October 19, 2006	Kitt Peak	Spacewatch	·	1.1 km	MPC · JPL
423963	2006 UM_{148}	—	October 20, 2006	Mount Lemmon	Mount Lemmon Survey	V	580 m	MPC · JPL
423964	2006 UO_{175}	—	October 16, 2006	Catalina	CSS	·	1.1 km	MPC · JPL
423965	2006 UU_{182}	—	October 16, 2006	Catalina	CSS	V	710 m	MPC · JPL
423966	2006 UU_{188}	—	October 19, 2006	Catalina	CSS	H	580 m	MPC · JPL
423967	2006 UE_{224}	—	September 30, 2006	Catalina	CSS	·	1.0 km	MPC · JPL
423968	2006 UJ_{224}	—	October 19, 2006	Catalina	CSS	·	1.4 km	MPC · JPL
423969	2006 UA_{236}	—	September 25, 2006	Kitt Peak	Spacewatch	·	860 m	MPC · JPL
423970	2006 UK_{246}	—	October 27, 2006	Mount Lemmon	Mount Lemmon Survey	NYS	940 m	MPC · JPL
423971	2006 UN_{254}	—	October 27, 2006	Mount Lemmon	Mount Lemmon Survey	MAS	670 m	MPC · JPL
423972	2006 UG_{274}	—	October 27, 2006	Kitt Peak	Spacewatch	·	1.1 km	MPC · JPL
423973	2006 UC_{279}	—	September 30, 2006	Mount Lemmon	Mount Lemmon Survey	·	3.3 km	MPC · JPL
423974	2006 UP_{330}	—	October 16, 2006	Apache Point	A. C. Becker	·	3.1 km	MPC · JPL
423975	2006 UO_{331}	—	October 23, 2006	Mount Lemmon	Mount Lemmon Survey	·	970 m	MPC · JPL
423976	2006 UH_{336}	—	October 20, 2006	Kitt Peak	Spacewatch	MAS	550 m	MPC · JPL
423977	2006 VK_{4}	—	October 13, 2006	Kitt Peak	Spacewatch	·	1.2 km	MPC · JPL
423978	2006 VY_{5}	—	November 10, 2006	Kitt Peak	Spacewatch	NYS	1.1 km	MPC · JPL
423979	2006 VD_{22}	—	November 10, 2006	Kitt Peak	Spacewatch	·	1.2 km	MPC · JPL
423980	2006 VH_{26}	—	October 17, 2006	Mount Lemmon	Mount Lemmon Survey	·	1.4 km	MPC · JPL
423981	2006 VN_{27}	—	November 10, 2006	Kitt Peak	Spacewatch	NYS	1.2 km	MPC · JPL
423982	2006 VZ_{45}	—	November 14, 2006	Mount Lemmon	Mount Lemmon Survey	·	1.1 km	MPC · JPL
423983	2006 VW_{50}	—	November 10, 2006	Kitt Peak	Spacewatch	NYS	1.1 km	MPC · JPL
423984	2006 VF_{52}	—	November 11, 2006	Kitt Peak	Spacewatch	·	1.2 km	MPC · JPL
423985	2006 VD_{58}	—	October 23, 2006	Mount Lemmon	Mount Lemmon Survey	·	840 m	MPC · JPL
423986	2006 VD_{61}	—	November 11, 2006	Kitt Peak	Spacewatch	·	920 m	MPC · JPL
423987	2006 VW_{65}	—	November 11, 2006	Kitt Peak	Spacewatch	V	680 m	MPC · JPL
423988	2006 VM_{67}	—	September 28, 2006	Mount Lemmon	Mount Lemmon Survey	·	1.0 km	MPC · JPL
423989	2006 VR_{70}	—	November 11, 2006	Kitt Peak	Spacewatch	·	1.2 km	MPC · JPL
423990	2006 VS_{71}	—	October 22, 2006	Catalina	CSS	·	920 m	MPC · JPL
423991	2006 VN_{80}	—	November 12, 2006	Mount Lemmon	Mount Lemmon Survey	·	1.1 km	MPC · JPL
423992	2006 VP_{80}	—	October 22, 2006	Mount Lemmon	Mount Lemmon Survey	·	1.0 km	MPC · JPL
423993	2006 VT_{80}	—	November 12, 2006	Mount Lemmon	Mount Lemmon Survey	NYS	1.1 km	MPC · JPL
423994	2006 VA_{109}	—	November 13, 2006	Kitt Peak	Spacewatch	·	1.1 km	MPC · JPL
423995	2006 VB_{116}	—	October 19, 2006	Catalina	CSS	H	600 m	MPC · JPL
423996	2006 VU_{116}	—	November 14, 2006	Kitt Peak	Spacewatch	·	860 m	MPC · JPL
423997	2006 VC_{117}	—	November 14, 2006	Kitt Peak	Spacewatch	·	1.1 km	MPC · JPL
423998	2006 VM_{119}	—	November 14, 2006	Mount Lemmon	Mount Lemmon Survey	·	930 m	MPC · JPL
423999	2006 VR_{123}	—	November 14, 2006	Kitt Peak	Spacewatch	·	1.3 km	MPC · JPL
424000	2006 VT_{125}	—	October 20, 2006	Mount Lemmon	Mount Lemmon Survey	·	1.4 km	MPC · JPL

back to top

== Meaning of names ==
As minor planet discoveries are confirmed, they are given a permanent number by the IAU's Minor Planet Center (MPC), and the discoverers can then submit names for them, following the IAU's naming conventions. The list below concerns those minor planets in the specified number-range that have received names, and explains the meanings of those names.

Official naming citations of newly named small Solar System bodies are approved and published in a bulletin by IAU's Working Group for Small Bodies Nomenclature (WGSBN). Before May 2021, citations were published in MPC's Minor Planet Circulars for many decades. Recent citations can also be found on the JPL Small-Body Database (SBDB). Until his death in 2016, German astronomer Lutz D. Schmadel compiled these citations into the Dictionary of Minor Planet Names (DMP) and regularly updated the collection.

Based on Paul Herget's The Names of the Minor Planets, Schmadel also researched the unclear origin of numerous asteroids, most of which had been named prior to World War II. This article incorporates text from this source, which is in the public domain: SBDB New namings may only be added to this list below after official publication as the preannouncement of names is condemned. The WGSBN publishes a comprehensive guideline for the naming rules of non-cometary small Solar System bodies.

Named minor planet	Provisional	This minor planet was named for...	Ref · Catalog
423097 Richardjarrell	2003 YL_{177}	Richard Adrian Jarrell (1946–2013), a Canadian historian of science and technology	JPL · 423097
423205 Echezeaux	2004 RS_{1}	The village of Flagey-Echezeaux, situated between Beaune and Dijon, France	JPL · 423205
423380 Juhászárpád	2005 JD_{94}	Árpád Juhász (born 1935) is a Hungarian geologist, one of the most significant figures in the spreading of scientific knowledge in Hungary. During his career, he made a number of geographical films and participated as an expert in geographical-themed popular science series on TV.	IAU · 423380
423433 Harsányi	2005 QL_{75}	John Harsanyi (János Harsányi; 1920–2000) was a Hungarian-American Nobel Prize laureate economist. He is best known for his contributions to the study of game theory and its application to economics.	IAU · 423433
423624 Udeantioquia	2005 WZ_{156}	University of Antioquia, a university that founded in 1803 by a royal decree issued by King Charles IV of Spain.	IAU · 423624
423645 Quénisset	2005 YM_{4}	Ferdinand Jules Quénisset (1872–1951), a French astronomer who discovered the comets C/1893 N1 and C/1911 S2.	IAU · 423645
