= Gediminas Juzeliūnas =

- Born: 14 July 1958 (age 66); Vilnius, Lithuania
- Occupation(s): Professor, Vilnius University
- Website: Personal homepage

Gediminas Juzeliūnas (born 14 July 1958) is a professor of theoretical physics and heads the Quantum optics group at Vilnius University in Lithuania. He has authored and co-authored more than 50 articles on quantum and nonlinear optics, as well as on theoretical condensed matter physics.

Juzeliūnas is best known for putting forward realistic schemes in order to generate artificial spin-orbit coupling for ultracold atoms. These advances were essential in order to make an experimental connection between spintronics and cold atomic gases. Furthermore, his landmark publications on slow light and artificial magnetic fields have led to important insights in quantum optics and many-body physics.

Asteroid 289021 Juzeliunas, discovered by astronomers Kazimieras Černis and Justas Zdanavičius in 2004, was named in his and his father's honor. The official naming citation was published by the Minor Planet Center on 5 January 2015 (M.P.C. 91793).
