= Meanings of minor-planet names: 289001–290000 =

As minor planet discoveries are confirmed, they are given a permanent number by the IAU's Minor Planet Center (MPC), and the discoverers can then submit names for them, following the IAU's naming conventions. The list below concerns those minor planets in the specified number-range that have received names, and explains the meanings of those names.

Official naming citations of newly named small Solar System bodies are approved and published in a bulletin by IAU's Working Group for Small Bodies Nomenclature (WGSBN). Before May 2021, citations were published in MPC's Minor Planet Circulars for many decades. Recent citations can also be found on the JPL Small-Body Database (SBDB). Until his death in 2016, German astronomer Lutz D. Schmadel compiled these citations into the Dictionary of Minor Planet Names (DMP) and regularly updated the collection.

Based on Paul Herget's The Names of the Minor Planets, Schmadel also researched the unclear origin of numerous asteroids, most of which had been named prior to World War II. This article incorporates text from this source, which is in the public domain: SBDB New namings may only be added to this list below after official publication as the preannouncement of names is condemned. The WGSBN publishes a comprehensive guideline for the naming rules of non-cometary small Solar System bodies.

== 289001–289100 ==
Named minor planet	Provisional	This minor planet was named for...	Ref · Catalog
289020 Ukmerge	2004 TG_{115}	Ukmergė, a city with 20,000 inhabitants in Vilnius County, Lithuania.	JPL · 289020
289021 Juzeliunas	2004 TM_{115}	Gediminas Juzeliūnas (born 1958), a Lithuanian theoretical physicist and head of the Quantum optics group at Vilnius University, who is known for his discoveries related to the properties of ultracold atoms. The object is also named in memory of his father Julius Juzeliūnas (1916–2001).	JPL · 289021
289085 Andreweil	2004 TC_{244}	André Weil (1906–1998), a French mathematician and founder of the Bourbaki group, known for his work in number theory and algebraic geometry	JPL · 289085

== 289101–289200 ==
back to top

Named minor planet	Provisional	This minor planet was named for...	Ref · Catalog
289116 Zurbuchen	2004 TQ_{354}	Thomas Zurbuchen (born 1968), a Swiss-American space scientist and Associate Administrator for the Science Mission Directorate at NASA.	IAU · 289116
289121 Druskininkai	2004 TM_{367}	Druskininkai is a spa town, with a population of 23 000, on the Nemunas River in southern Lithuania.	IAU · 289121

== 289201–289300 ==
back to top

Named minor planet	Provisional	This minor planet was named for...	Ref · Catalog
There are no named minor planets in this number range

== 289301–289400 ==
back to top

Named minor planet	Provisional	This minor planet was named for...	Ref · Catalog
289314 Chisholm	2005 AS_{23}	Eric Chisholm (born 1975), an engineering physicist and manager of the interpretive facility in Victoria	JPL · 289314

== 289401–289500 ==
back to top

Named minor planet	Provisional	This minor planet was named for...	Ref · Catalog
There are no named minor planets in this number range

== 289501–289600 ==
back to top

Named minor planet	Provisional	This minor planet was named for...	Ref · Catalog
289586 Shackleton	2005 FZ_{4}	Ernest Shackleton (1874–1922), an Anglo-Irish explorer who led three British expeditions to the Antarctic including the Nimrod Expedition and the Shackleton–Rowett Expedition	JPL · 289586
289587 Chantdugros	2005 FB_{5}	Le Chant du Gros, an open-air music festival founded by Gilles Pierre in 1991 and held in Le Noirmont, Switzerland	JPL · 289587
289600 Tastevin	2005 GR_{9}	The Confrérie des Chevaliers du Tastevin, a Bacchanalian fraternity of Burgundian wine connoisseurs.	JPL · 289600

== 289601–289700 ==
back to top

Named minor planet	Provisional	This minor planet was named for...	Ref · Catalog
289608 Wanli	2005 GB_{22}	Mari Furukawa (born 1973), known as "Wanli", a Japanese painter	JPL · 289608

== 289701–289800 ==
back to top

Named minor planet	Provisional	This minor planet was named for...	Ref · Catalog
There are no named minor planets in this number range

== 289801–289900 ==
back to top

Named minor planet	Provisional	This minor planet was named for...	Ref · Catalog
There are no named minor planets in this number range

== 289901–290000 ==
back to top

Named minor planet	Provisional	This minor planet was named for...	Ref · Catalog
289992 Onfray	2005 PF_{6}	Michel Onfray (born 1959), a French philosopher and founder of the tuition-free Popular University of Caen (French: Université populaire de Caen)	JPL · 289992

back to top

Preceded by 288,001–289,000	Meanings of minor-planet names List of minor planets: 289,001–290,000	Succeeded by 290,001–291,000
