= List of minor planets: 289001–290000 =

The following is a partial list of minor planets, running from minor-planet number 289001 through 290000, inclusive. The primary data for this and other partial lists is based on JPL's "Small-Body Orbital Elements" and data available from the Minor Planet Center. Critical list information is also provided by the MPC, unless otherwise specified from Lowell Observatory. A detailed description of the table's columns and additional sources are given on the main page including a complete list of every page in this series, and a statistical break-up on the dynamical classification of minor planets.

Also see the summary list of all named bodies in numerical and alphabetical order, and the corresponding naming citations for the number range of this particular list. New namings may only be added to this list after official publication, as the preannouncement of names is condemned by the Working Group for Small Bodies Nomenclature of the International Astronomical Union.

Near-Earth obj.	MBA (inner)	MBA (outer)	Centaur
Mars-crosser	MBA (middle)	Jupiter trojan	Trans-Neptunian obj.
Unclassified

== 289001–289100 ==
Designation			Discovery			Properties		Ref
Permanent	Provisional	Named after	Date	Site	Discoverer(s)	Category	Diam.	Ref
289001	2004 TV_{74}	—	October 6, 2004	Kitt Peak	Spacewatch	·	3.5 km	MPC · JPL
289002	2004 TF_{75}	—	October 6, 2004	Kitt Peak	Spacewatch	·	3.6 km	MPC · JPL
289003	2004 TS_{75}	—	October 6, 2004	Palomar	NEAT	V	920 m	MPC · JPL
289004	2004 TJ_{77}	—	October 7, 2004	Anderson Mesa	LONEOS	·	1.2 km	MPC · JPL
289005	2004 TM_{79}	—	October 4, 2004	Anderson Mesa	LONEOS	·	3.7 km	MPC · JPL
289006	2004 TD_{84}	—	October 5, 2004	Kitt Peak	Spacewatch	NYS	700 m	MPC · JPL
289007	2004 TW_{86}	—	October 5, 2004	Kitt Peak	Spacewatch	·	870 m	MPC · JPL
289008	2004 TG_{88}	—	October 5, 2004	Kitt Peak	Spacewatch	·	3.3 km	MPC · JPL
289009	2004 TM_{91}	—	October 5, 2004	Kitt Peak	Spacewatch	·	2.6 km	MPC · JPL
289010	2004 TD_{95}	—	October 5, 2004	Kitt Peak	Spacewatch	·	1.0 km	MPC · JPL
289011	2004 TL_{102}	—	October 6, 2004	Kitt Peak	Spacewatch	·	1.2 km	MPC · JPL
289012	2004 TM_{103}	—	October 7, 2004	Anderson Mesa	LONEOS	·	4.6 km	MPC · JPL
289013	2004 TN_{103}	—	October 7, 2004	Anderson Mesa	LONEOS	·	810 m	MPC · JPL
289014	2004 TW_{103}	—	October 7, 2004	Kitt Peak	Spacewatch	·	1.8 km	MPC · JPL
289015	2004 TA_{106}	—	October 7, 2004	Socorro	LINEAR	·	1.6 km	MPC · JPL
289016	2004 TQ_{107}	—	October 7, 2004	Kitt Peak	Spacewatch	·	2.7 km	MPC · JPL
289017	2004 TW_{110}	—	October 7, 2004	Kitt Peak	Spacewatch	·	1.4 km	MPC · JPL
289018	2004 TS_{113}	—	October 7, 2004	Palomar	NEAT	·	1.4 km	MPC · JPL
289019	2004 TR_{114}	—	October 8, 2004	Kitt Peak	Spacewatch	·	4.2 km	MPC · JPL
289020 Ukmergė	2004 TG_{115}	Ukmergė	October 12, 2004	Moletai	K. Černis	CLA	2.8 km	MPC · JPL
289021 Juzeliūnas	2004 TM_{115}	Juzeliūnas	October 12, 2004	Moletai	K. Černis, Zdanavicius, J.	·	4.0 km	MPC · JPL
289022	2004 TN_{115}	—	October 9, 2004	Socorro	LINEAR	·	2.9 km	MPC · JPL
289023	2004 TG_{116}	—	October 4, 2004	Anderson Mesa	LONEOS	V	870 m	MPC · JPL
289024	2004 TS_{116}	—	October 4, 2004	Anderson Mesa	LONEOS	·	1.9 km	MPC · JPL
289025	2004 TX_{119}	—	October 6, 2004	Palomar	NEAT	·	2.9 km	MPC · JPL
289026	2004 TU_{120}	—	October 6, 2004	Palomar	NEAT	·	1.1 km	MPC · JPL
289027	2004 TW_{120}	—	October 6, 2004	Palomar	NEAT	·	4.0 km	MPC · JPL
289028	2004 TP_{121}	—	October 7, 2004	Anderson Mesa	LONEOS	·	1.5 km	MPC · JPL
289029	2004 TZ_{123}	—	October 7, 2004	Socorro	LINEAR	·	1.6 km	MPC · JPL
289030	2004 TF_{127}	—	October 7, 2004	Socorro	LINEAR	·	5.0 km	MPC · JPL
289031	2004 TJ_{127}	—	October 7, 2004	Socorro	LINEAR	·	1.1 km	MPC · JPL
289032	2004 TL_{129}	—	October 7, 2004	Socorro	LINEAR	·	3.5 km	MPC · JPL
289033	2004 TD_{131}	—	October 7, 2004	Anderson Mesa	LONEOS	LIX	5.0 km	MPC · JPL
289034	2004 TJ_{133}	—	October 7, 2004	Anderson Mesa	LONEOS	·	1.3 km	MPC · JPL
289035	2004 TR_{134}	—	October 8, 2004	Anderson Mesa	LONEOS	CYB	5.0 km	MPC · JPL
289036	2004 TJ_{136}	—	October 8, 2004	Anderson Mesa	LONEOS	·	1.8 km	MPC · JPL
289037	2004 TZ_{136}	—	October 8, 2004	Anderson Mesa	LONEOS	V	1.0 km	MPC · JPL
289038	2004 TO_{138}	—	October 9, 2004	Anderson Mesa	LONEOS	·	3.7 km	MPC · JPL
289039	2004 TC_{141}	—	October 4, 2004	Kitt Peak	Spacewatch	·	1.7 km	MPC · JPL
289040	2004 TH_{145}	—	October 5, 2004	Kitt Peak	Spacewatch	·	2.6 km	MPC · JPL
289041	2004 TF_{146}	—	October 5, 2004	Kitt Peak	Spacewatch	·	2.4 km	MPC · JPL
289042	2004 TW_{153}	—	October 6, 2004	Kitt Peak	Spacewatch	·	2.4 km	MPC · JPL
289043	2004 TQ_{159}	—	October 6, 2004	Kitt Peak	Spacewatch	·	740 m	MPC · JPL
289044	2004 TA_{160}	—	October 6, 2004	Kitt Peak	Spacewatch	·	3.1 km	MPC · JPL
289045	2004 TZ_{160}	—	October 6, 2004	Kitt Peak	Spacewatch	ERI	3.3 km	MPC · JPL
289046	2004 TM_{162}	—	October 6, 2004	Kitt Peak	Spacewatch	·	1.4 km	MPC · JPL
289047	2004 TY_{163}	—	October 6, 2004	Kitt Peak	Spacewatch	·	1.6 km	MPC · JPL
289048	2004 TP_{168}	—	October 7, 2004	Socorro	LINEAR	V	1.1 km	MPC · JPL
289049	2004 TH_{170}	—	October 7, 2004	Socorro	LINEAR	·	950 m	MPC · JPL
289050	2004 TN_{172}	—	October 8, 2004	Socorro	LINEAR	·	3.9 km	MPC · JPL
289051	2004 TB_{176}	—	October 9, 2004	Socorro	LINEAR	·	1.4 km	MPC · JPL
289052	2004 TW_{176}	—	October 4, 2004	Kitt Peak	Spacewatch	·	4.0 km	MPC · JPL
289053	2004 TQ_{177}	—	October 7, 2004	Kitt Peak	Spacewatch	·	3.2 km	MPC · JPL
289054	2004 TO_{180}	—	October 7, 2004	Kitt Peak	Spacewatch	·	3.1 km	MPC · JPL
289055	2004 TA_{182}	—	October 7, 2004	Kitt Peak	Spacewatch	·	1.7 km	MPC · JPL
289056	2004 TG_{185}	—	October 7, 2004	Kitt Peak	Spacewatch	V	790 m	MPC · JPL
289057	2004 TY_{185}	—	October 7, 2004	Kitt Peak	Spacewatch	·	1.8 km	MPC · JPL
289058	2004 TU_{190}	—	October 7, 2004	Kitt Peak	Spacewatch	MAS	720 m	MPC · JPL
289059	2004 TE_{196}	—	October 7, 2004	Kitt Peak	Spacewatch	LIX	5.4 km	MPC · JPL
289060	2004 TO_{199}	—	October 7, 2004	Kitt Peak	Spacewatch	·	3.2 km	MPC · JPL
289061	2004 TA_{200}	—	October 7, 2004	Kitt Peak	Spacewatch	·	3.4 km	MPC · JPL
289062	2004 TC_{200}	—	October 7, 2004	Kitt Peak	Spacewatch	·	1.1 km	MPC · JPL
289063	2004 TR_{200}	—	October 7, 2004	Kitt Peak	Spacewatch	·	3.6 km	MPC · JPL
289064	2004 TL_{204}	—	October 7, 2004	Kitt Peak	Spacewatch	·	3.0 km	MPC · JPL
289065	2004 TM_{204}	—	October 7, 2004	Kitt Peak	Spacewatch	·	1.2 km	MPC · JPL
289066	2004 TK_{207}	—	October 7, 2004	Kitt Peak	Spacewatch	NYS	1.3 km	MPC · JPL
289067	2004 TV_{208}	—	October 8, 2004	Kitt Peak	Spacewatch	NYS	1.3 km	MPC · JPL
289068	2004 TG_{209}	—	October 8, 2004	Kitt Peak	Spacewatch	·	3.8 km	MPC · JPL
289069	2004 TU_{210}	—	October 8, 2004	Kitt Peak	Spacewatch	MAS	900 m	MPC · JPL
289070	2004 TZ_{210}	—	October 8, 2004	Kitt Peak	Spacewatch	·	1.6 km	MPC · JPL
289071	2004 TC_{211}	—	October 8, 2004	Kitt Peak	Spacewatch	·	2.2 km	MPC · JPL
289072	2004 TN_{211}	—	October 8, 2004	Kitt Peak	Spacewatch	AGN	1.2 km	MPC · JPL
289073	2004 TX_{212}	—	October 8, 2004	Kitt Peak	Spacewatch	·	1.7 km	MPC · JPL
289074	2004 TE_{213}	—	October 8, 2004	Kitt Peak	Spacewatch	THM	2.7 km	MPC · JPL
289075	2004 TK_{213}	—	October 8, 2004	Kitt Peak	Spacewatch	·	2.8 km	MPC · JPL
289076	2004 TF_{214}	—	October 9, 2004	Kitt Peak	Spacewatch	·	2.3 km	MPC · JPL
289077	2004 TW_{217}	—	October 5, 2004	Kitt Peak	Spacewatch	HYG	3.0 km	MPC · JPL
289078	2004 TT_{222}	—	October 7, 2004	Kitt Peak	Spacewatch	·	2.8 km	MPC · JPL
289079	2004 TS_{237}	—	October 9, 2004	Socorro	LINEAR	·	1.2 km	MPC · JPL
289080	2004 TA_{238}	—	October 9, 2004	Kitt Peak	Spacewatch	·	2.8 km	MPC · JPL
289081	2004 TE_{241}	—	October 10, 2004	Socorro	LINEAR	·	1.6 km	MPC · JPL
289082	2004 TZ_{241}	—	October 10, 2004	Socorro	LINEAR	·	990 m	MPC · JPL
289083	2004 TP_{242}	—	October 6, 2004	Socorro	LINEAR	·	3.9 km	MPC · JPL
289084	2004 TB_{243}	—	October 6, 2004	Socorro	LINEAR	·	1.7 km	MPC · JPL
289085 Andreweil	2004 TC_{244}	Andreweil	October 6, 2004	Saint-Sulpice	Saint-Sulpice	·	900 m	MPC · JPL
289086	2004 TT_{252}	—	October 9, 2004	Kitt Peak	Spacewatch	·	2.2 km	MPC · JPL
289087	2004 TB_{256}	—	October 9, 2004	Palomar	NEAT	·	1.8 km	MPC · JPL
289088	2004 TY_{258}	—	October 9, 2004	Kitt Peak	Spacewatch	·	910 m	MPC · JPL
289089	2004 TH_{263}	—	October 9, 2004	Kitt Peak	Spacewatch	ADE	2.1 km	MPC · JPL
289090	2004 TA_{269}	—	October 9, 2004	Kitt Peak	Spacewatch	·	3.1 km	MPC · JPL
289091	2004 TQ_{272}	—	October 9, 2004	Kitt Peak	Spacewatch	EOS	2.5 km	MPC · JPL
289092	2004 TP_{274}	—	October 9, 2004	Kitt Peak	Spacewatch	MAS	750 m	MPC · JPL
289093	2004 TQ_{275}	—	October 9, 2004	Kitt Peak	Spacewatch	·	730 m	MPC · JPL
289094	2004 TC_{277}	—	October 9, 2004	Kitt Peak	Spacewatch	·	850 m	MPC · JPL
289095	2004 TF_{279}	—	October 9, 2004	Kitt Peak	Spacewatch	HYG	3.4 km	MPC · JPL
289096	2004 TW_{294}	—	October 10, 2004	Kitt Peak	Spacewatch	NYS	1.5 km	MPC · JPL
289097	2004 TG_{296}	—	October 10, 2004	Kitt Peak	Spacewatch	·	1.9 km	MPC · JPL
289098	2004 TJ_{298}	—	October 12, 2004	Kitt Peak	Spacewatch	·	1.1 km	MPC · JPL
289099	2004 TS_{301}	—	October 8, 2004	Socorro	LINEAR	·	1.5 km	MPC · JPL
289100	2004 TR_{302}	—	October 9, 2004	Socorro	LINEAR	MAS	970 m	MPC · JPL

== 289101–289200 ==
back to top

Designation			Discovery			Properties		Ref
Permanent	Provisional	Named after	Date	Site	Discoverer(s)	Category	Diam.	Ref
289101	2004 TK_{305}	—	October 10, 2004	Kitt Peak	Spacewatch	V	760 m	MPC · JPL
289102	2004 TK_{306}	—	October 10, 2004	Socorro	LINEAR	EOS	2.0 km	MPC · JPL
289103	2004 TG_{308}	—	October 10, 2004	Socorro	LINEAR	·	1.2 km	MPC · JPL
289104	2004 TB_{309}	—	October 10, 2004	Kitt Peak	Spacewatch	NYS	1.2 km	MPC · JPL
289105	2004 TT_{309}	—	October 10, 2004	Socorro	LINEAR	EOS	3.0 km	MPC · JPL
289106	2004 TK_{322}	—	October 11, 2004	Kitt Peak	Spacewatch	·	1.5 km	MPC · JPL
289107	2004 TR_{322}	—	October 11, 2004	Kitt Peak	Spacewatch	·	1.0 km	MPC · JPL
289108	2004 TX_{326}	—	October 14, 2004	Palomar	NEAT	·	4.9 km	MPC · JPL
289109	2004 TU_{327}	—	October 3, 2004	Palomar	NEAT	·	4.6 km	MPC · JPL
289110	2004 TL_{334}	—	October 10, 2004	Kitt Peak	Spacewatch	WIT	1.2 km	MPC · JPL
289111	2004 TC_{337}	—	October 11, 2004	Palomar	NEAT	·	4.0 km	MPC · JPL
289112	2004 TR_{344}	—	October 15, 2004	Anderson Mesa	LONEOS	·	1.8 km	MPC · JPL
289113	2004 TS_{344}	—	October 15, 2004	Kitt Peak	Spacewatch	3:2 · SHU	8.4 km	MPC · JPL
289114	2004 TK_{346}	—	October 15, 2004	Kitt Peak	Spacewatch	·	1.3 km	MPC · JPL
289115	2004 TV_{347}	—	October 4, 2004	Kitt Peak	Spacewatch	·	2.4 km	MPC · JPL
289116 Zurbuchen	2004 TQ_{354}	Zurbuchen	October 11, 2004	Kitt Peak	M. W. Buie	ERI	3.1 km	MPC · JPL
289117	2004 TV_{355}	—	October 7, 2004	Socorro	LINEAR	·	3.1 km	MPC · JPL
289118	2004 TK_{357}	—	October 14, 2004	Anderson Mesa	LONEOS	·	3.4 km	MPC · JPL
289119	2004 TF_{359}	—	October 7, 2004	Kitt Peak	Spacewatch	3:2	5.6 km	MPC · JPL
289120	2004 TT_{360}	—	October 11, 2004	Kitt Peak	Spacewatch	·	700 m	MPC · JPL
289121 Druskininkai	2004 TM_{367}	Druskininkai	October 12, 2004	Moletai	K. Černis, J. Zdanavicius	·	1.5 km	MPC · JPL
289122	2004 TY_{367}	—	October 6, 2004	Kitt Peak	Spacewatch	·	690 m	MPC · JPL
289123	2004 UV	—	October 16, 2004	Socorro	LINEAR	H	720 m	MPC · JPL
289124	2004 UE_{1}	—	October 17, 2004	Pla D'Arguines	R. Ferrando	THB	4.7 km	MPC · JPL
289125	2004 UV_{2}	—	October 18, 2004	Socorro	LINEAR	V	1.0 km	MPC · JPL
289126	2004 UW_{2}	—	October 18, 2004	Socorro	LINEAR	DOR	3.4 km	MPC · JPL
289127	2004 UV_{3}	—	October 16, 2004	Socorro	LINEAR	·	3.5 km	MPC · JPL
289128	2004 UZ_{5}	—	October 20, 2004	Socorro	LINEAR	NYS	1.1 km	MPC · JPL
289129	2004 UL_{6}	—	October 20, 2004	Socorro	LINEAR	·	1.5 km	MPC · JPL
289130	2004 UQ_{7}	—	October 21, 2004	Socorro	LINEAR	·	3.9 km	MPC · JPL
289131	2004 UD_{8}	—	October 21, 2004	Socorro	LINEAR	·	1.7 km	MPC · JPL
289132	2004 UO_{8}	—	October 21, 2004	Socorro	LINEAR	·	3.0 km	MPC · JPL
289133	2004 UY_{8}	—	October 23, 2004	Socorro	LINEAR	MAR	1.2 km	MPC · JPL
289134	2004 VL	—	November 2, 2004	Anderson Mesa	LONEOS	PHO	1.3 km	MPC · JPL
289135	2004 VK_{4}	—	November 3, 2004	Kitt Peak	Spacewatch	NYS	1.2 km	MPC · JPL
289136	2004 VN_{4}	—	November 3, 2004	Kitt Peak	Spacewatch	CYB	5.5 km	MPC · JPL
289137	2004 VC_{5}	—	November 3, 2004	Anderson Mesa	LONEOS	·	970 m	MPC · JPL
289138	2004 VM_{7}	—	November 3, 2004	Kitt Peak	Spacewatch	·	1.2 km	MPC · JPL
289139	2004 VR_{7}	—	November 3, 2004	Kitt Peak	Spacewatch	·	1.5 km	MPC · JPL
289140	2004 VW_{7}	—	November 3, 2004	Kitt Peak	Spacewatch	·	810 m	MPC · JPL
289141	2004 VJ_{8}	—	November 3, 2004	Anderson Mesa	LONEOS	·	1.4 km	MPC · JPL
289142	2004 VD_{9}	—	November 3, 2004	Anderson Mesa	LONEOS	T_{j} (2.96) · 3:2	7.0 km	MPC · JPL
289143	2004 VH_{11}	—	November 3, 2004	Palomar	NEAT	3:2 · SHU	11 km	MPC · JPL
289144	2004 VM_{12}	—	November 3, 2004	Palomar	NEAT	·	1.5 km	MPC · JPL
289145	2004 VK_{14}	—	November 4, 2004	Catalina	CSS	·	5.1 km	MPC · JPL
289146	2004 VL_{14}	—	November 4, 2004	Catalina	CSS	·	840 m	MPC · JPL
289147	2004 VU_{16}	—	November 5, 2004	Needville	J. Dellinger, Garossino, P.	TIR	3.4 km	MPC · JPL
289148	2004 VV_{16}	—	November 3, 2004	Kitt Peak	Spacewatch	·	1.3 km	MPC · JPL
289149	2004 VU_{18}	—	November 4, 2004	Kitt Peak	Spacewatch	MAS	910 m	MPC · JPL
289150	2004 VL_{20}	—	November 4, 2004	Catalina	CSS	EOS	2.7 km	MPC · JPL
289151	2004 VA_{21}	—	November 4, 2004	Catalina	CSS	NYS	1.3 km	MPC · JPL
289152	2004 VU_{21}	—	November 4, 2004	Catalina	CSS	V	1.0 km	MPC · JPL
289153	2004 VR_{24}	—	November 4, 2004	Anderson Mesa	LONEOS	V	860 m	MPC · JPL
289154	2004 VW_{24}	—	November 4, 2004	Anderson Mesa	LONEOS	·	2.7 km	MPC · JPL
289155	2004 VB_{25}	—	November 4, 2004	Anderson Mesa	LONEOS	·	1.2 km	MPC · JPL
289156	2004 VH_{25}	—	November 4, 2004	Anderson Mesa	LONEOS	JUN	1.1 km	MPC · JPL
289157	2004 VO_{25}	—	November 4, 2004	Kitt Peak	Spacewatch	·	4.3 km	MPC · JPL
289158	2004 VS_{25}	—	November 4, 2004	Catalina	CSS	·	4.5 km	MPC · JPL
289159	2004 VZ_{26}	—	November 4, 2004	Catalina	CSS	·	4.8 km	MPC · JPL
289160	2004 VT_{29}	—	November 3, 2004	Kitt Peak	Spacewatch	·	3.6 km	MPC · JPL
289161	2004 VT_{35}	—	November 3, 2004	Kitt Peak	Spacewatch	·	1.3 km	MPC · JPL
289162	2004 VH_{36}	—	November 4, 2004	Kitt Peak	Spacewatch	AGN	1.3 km	MPC · JPL
289163	2004 VB_{37}	—	November 4, 2004	Kitt Peak	Spacewatch	·	1.9 km	MPC · JPL
289164	2004 VZ_{45}	—	November 4, 2004	Kitt Peak	Spacewatch	NYS	1.2 km	MPC · JPL
289165	2004 VD_{48}	—	November 4, 2004	Kitt Peak	Spacewatch	T_{j} (2.99) · EUP	4.5 km	MPC · JPL
289166	2004 VK_{52}	—	November 4, 2004	Catalina	CSS	·	1.3 km	MPC · JPL
289167	2004 VC_{55}	—	November 10, 2004	Desert Eagle	W. K. Y. Yeung	NYS	1.6 km	MPC · JPL
289168	2004 VR_{56}	—	November 4, 2004	Catalina	CSS	·	1.6 km	MPC · JPL
289169	2004 VG_{59}	—	November 9, 2004	Catalina	CSS	·	1.1 km	MPC · JPL
289170	2004 VX_{59}	—	November 9, 2004	Catalina	CSS	·	3.5 km	MPC · JPL
289171	2004 VT_{61}	—	November 5, 2004	Palomar	NEAT	NYS	1.1 km	MPC · JPL
289172	2004 VM_{63}	—	November 10, 2004	Kitt Peak	Spacewatch	·	2.8 km	MPC · JPL
289173	2004 VR_{63}	—	November 10, 2004	Kitt Peak	Spacewatch	·	1.2 km	MPC · JPL
289174	2004 VV_{64}	—	November 10, 2004	Kitt Peak	Spacewatch	·	4.2 km	MPC · JPL
289175	2004 VV_{66}	—	November 5, 2004	Kitt Peak	Spacewatch	KON	2.0 km	MPC · JPL
289176	2004 VT_{70}	—	November 5, 2004	Palomar	NEAT	MAS	810 m	MPC · JPL
289177	2004 VU_{72}	—	November 4, 2004	Catalina	CSS	·	1.4 km	MPC · JPL
289178	2004 VV_{72}	—	November 4, 2004	Catalina	CSS	·	1.1 km	MPC · JPL
289179	2004 VT_{73}	—	November 11, 2004	Anderson Mesa	LONEOS	·	4.4 km	MPC · JPL
289180	2004 VT_{74}	—	November 12, 2004	Catalina	CSS	·	5.2 km	MPC · JPL
289181	2004 VY_{74}	—	November 12, 2004	Catalina	CSS	·	3.3 km	MPC · JPL
289182	2004 VA_{75}	—	November 12, 2004	Catalina	CSS	EOS	2.8 km	MPC · JPL
289183	2004 VE_{75}	—	November 13, 2004	Catalina	CSS	PHO	2.0 km	MPC · JPL
289184	2004 VV_{76}	—	November 12, 2004	Catalina	CSS	·	1.6 km	MPC · JPL
289185	2004 VY_{77}	—	November 13, 2004	Catalina	CSS	·	1.1 km	MPC · JPL
289186	2004 VG_{78}	—	November 12, 2004	Siding Spring	SSS	·	5.3 km	MPC · JPL
289187	2004 VB_{84}	—	November 10, 2004	Kitt Peak	Spacewatch	·	3.0 km	MPC · JPL
289188	2004 VH_{84}	—	November 10, 2004	Kitt Peak	Spacewatch	3:2 · SHU	6.2 km	MPC · JPL
289189	2004 VQ_{85}	—	November 10, 2004	Kitt Peak	Spacewatch	·	1.3 km	MPC · JPL
289190	2004 VO_{91}	—	November 3, 2004	Anderson Mesa	LONEOS	·	1.3 km	MPC · JPL
289191	2004 WE_{1}	—	November 17, 2004	Campo Imperatore	CINEOS	MAS	730 m	MPC · JPL
289192	2004 WT_{5}	—	November 19, 2004	Kitt Peak	Spacewatch	NYS	1 km	MPC · JPL
289193	2004 WF_{6}	—	November 19, 2004	Socorro	LINEAR	ERI	3.1 km	MPC · JPL
289194	2004 WC_{11}	—	November 20, 2004	Kitt Peak	Spacewatch	·	1.4 km	MPC · JPL
289195	2004 WL_{11}	—	November 30, 2004	Anderson Mesa	LONEOS	·	1.3 km	MPC · JPL
289196	2004 WL_{12}	—	November 19, 2004	Socorro	LINEAR	V	950 m	MPC · JPL
289197	2004 XY_{1}	—	December 1, 2004	Palomar	NEAT	·	3.1 km	MPC · JPL
289198	2004 XZ_{4}	—	December 2, 2004	Catalina	CSS	·	1.9 km	MPC · JPL
289199	2004 XC_{5}	—	December 2, 2004	Catalina	CSS	·	2.1 km	MPC · JPL
289200	2004 XN_{5}	—	December 2, 2004	Socorro	LINEAR	·	1.2 km	MPC · JPL

== 289201–289300 ==
back to top

Designation			Discovery			Properties		Ref
Permanent	Provisional	Named after	Date	Site	Discoverer(s)	Category	Diam.	Ref
289201	2004 XV_{5}	—	December 5, 2004	Bareggio	Bareggio	NYS	1.1 km	MPC · JPL
289202	2004 XH_{6}	—	December 9, 2004	Vail-Jarnac	Jarnac	NYS	1.6 km	MPC · JPL
289203	2004 XU_{7}	—	December 2, 2004	Palomar	NEAT	·	1.8 km	MPC · JPL
289204	2004 XL_{9}	—	December 2, 2004	Catalina	CSS	·	1.4 km	MPC · JPL
289205	2004 XA_{12}	—	December 7, 2004	Socorro	LINEAR	·	1.9 km	MPC · JPL
289206	2004 XJ_{12}	—	December 8, 2004	Socorro	LINEAR	·	1.1 km	MPC · JPL
289207	2004 XG_{13}	—	December 8, 2004	Socorro	LINEAR	·	900 m	MPC · JPL
289208	2004 XK_{17}	—	December 3, 2004	Palomar	NEAT	·	1.8 km	MPC · JPL
289209	2004 XF_{19}	—	December 8, 2004	Socorro	LINEAR	·	2.4 km	MPC · JPL
289210	2004 XK_{20}	—	December 8, 2004	Socorro	LINEAR	·	1.4 km	MPC · JPL
289211	2004 XH_{22}	—	December 8, 2004	Socorro	LINEAR	·	4.3 km	MPC · JPL
289212	2004 XF_{23}	—	December 8, 2004	Socorro	LINEAR	·	2.7 km	MPC · JPL
289213	2004 XV_{24}	—	December 9, 2004	Kitt Peak	Spacewatch	·	2.0 km	MPC · JPL
289214	2004 XE_{25}	—	December 9, 2004	Catalina	CSS	·	2.6 km	MPC · JPL
289215	2004 XV_{30}	—	December 10, 2004	Socorro	LINEAR	·	2.4 km	MPC · JPL
289216	2004 XR_{31}	—	December 9, 2004	Catalina	CSS	·	1.1 km	MPC · JPL
289217	2004 XK_{36}	—	December 10, 2004	Socorro	LINEAR	·	5.1 km	MPC · JPL
289218	2004 XB_{39}	—	December 7, 2004	Socorro	LINEAR	·	2.9 km	MPC · JPL
289219	2004 XU_{40}	—	December 11, 2004	Socorro	LINEAR	·	7.0 km	MPC · JPL
289220	2004 XX_{40}	—	December 11, 2004	Socorro	LINEAR	·	1.7 km	MPC · JPL
289221	2004 XL_{41}	—	December 11, 2004	Campo Imperatore	CINEOS	·	1.1 km	MPC · JPL
289222	2004 XG_{44}	—	December 11, 2004	Campo Imperatore	CINEOS	·	2.6 km	MPC · JPL
289223	2004 XD_{46}	—	December 9, 2004	Kitt Peak	Spacewatch	·	1.6 km	MPC · JPL
289224	2004 XL_{48}	—	December 10, 2004	Socorro	LINEAR	·	1.6 km	MPC · JPL
289225	2004 XH_{53}	—	December 10, 2004	Kitt Peak	Spacewatch	·	1.4 km	MPC · JPL
289226	2004 XX_{60}	—	December 12, 2004	Kitt Peak	Spacewatch	NEM	2.9 km	MPC · JPL
289227	2004 XY_{60}	—	December 14, 2004	Siding Spring	SSS	ATE	660 m	MPC · JPL
289228	2004 XB_{62}	—	December 12, 2004	Needville	W. G. Dillon, M. Eastman	EUP	4.5 km	MPC · JPL
289229	2004 XR_{62}	—	December 8, 2004	Socorro	LINEAR	·	2.8 km	MPC · JPL
289230	2004 XY_{63}	—	December 2, 2004	Kitt Peak	Spacewatch	·	2.4 km	MPC · JPL
289231	2004 XE_{66}	—	December 2, 2004	Palomar	NEAT	3:2 · SHU	6.4 km	MPC · JPL
289232	2004 XK_{69}	—	December 10, 2004	Socorro	LINEAR	·	1.5 km	MPC · JPL
289233	2004 XL_{69}	—	December 10, 2004	Catalina	CSS	PHO	1.2 km	MPC · JPL
289234	2004 XN_{70}	—	December 11, 2004	Catalina	CSS	·	3.3 km	MPC · JPL
289235	2004 XY_{70}	—	December 11, 2004	Kitt Peak	Spacewatch	·	740 m	MPC · JPL
289236	2004 XA_{75}	—	December 9, 2004	Kitt Peak	Spacewatch	·	2.1 km	MPC · JPL
289237	2004 XF_{75}	—	December 9, 2004	Kitt Peak	Spacewatch	·	3.8 km	MPC · JPL
289238	2004 XO_{75}	—	December 9, 2004	Catalina	CSS	·	5.2 km	MPC · JPL
289239	2004 XV_{75}	—	December 10, 2004	Kitt Peak	Spacewatch	NYS	1.8 km	MPC · JPL
289240	2004 XU_{76}	—	December 10, 2004	Socorro	LINEAR	EOS	2.8 km	MPC · JPL
289241	2004 XK_{77}	—	December 10, 2004	Vail-Jarnac	Jarnac	EOS	2.7 km	MPC · JPL
289242	2004 XO_{77}	—	December 10, 2004	Socorro	LINEAR	ELF	5.7 km	MPC · JPL
289243	2004 XH_{78}	—	December 10, 2004	Socorro	LINEAR	·	3.3 km	MPC · JPL
289244	2004 XX_{78}	—	December 10, 2004	Socorro	LINEAR	·	930 m	MPC · JPL
289245	2004 XJ_{79}	—	December 10, 2004	Socorro	LINEAR	THM	2.9 km	MPC · JPL
289246	2004 XH_{81}	—	December 10, 2004	Socorro	LINEAR	·	1.1 km	MPC · JPL
289247	2004 XM_{83}	—	December 11, 2004	Kitt Peak	Spacewatch	NYS	980 m	MPC · JPL
289248	2004 XQ_{84}	—	December 12, 2004	Kitt Peak	Spacewatch	THM	3.4 km	MPC · JPL
289249	2004 XT_{84}	—	December 12, 2004	Kitt Peak	Spacewatch	NYS	1.4 km	MPC · JPL
289250	2004 XZ_{85}	—	December 13, 2004	Kitt Peak	Spacewatch	·	4.3 km	MPC · JPL
289251	2004 XC_{86}	—	December 13, 2004	Kitt Peak	Spacewatch	·	1.8 km	MPC · JPL
289252	2004 XQ_{86}	—	December 13, 2004	Kitt Peak	Spacewatch	·	1.5 km	MPC · JPL
289253	2004 XR_{86}	—	December 13, 2004	Kitt Peak	Spacewatch	ERI	1.9 km	MPC · JPL
289254	2004 XK_{89}	—	December 10, 2004	Campo Imperatore	CINEOS	·	1.7 km	MPC · JPL
289255	2004 XE_{92}	—	December 11, 2004	Socorro	LINEAR	·	1.4 km	MPC · JPL
289256	2004 XV_{92}	—	December 11, 2004	Socorro	LINEAR	·	1.4 km	MPC · JPL
289257	2004 XQ_{99}	—	December 12, 2004	Kitt Peak	Spacewatch	MAS	910 m	MPC · JPL
289258	2004 XC_{101}	—	December 14, 2004	Socorro	LINEAR	·	1.4 km	MPC · JPL
289259	2004 XO_{101}	—	December 14, 2004	Catalina	CSS	·	1.0 km	MPC · JPL
289260	2004 XB_{105}	—	December 10, 2004	Palomar	NEAT	NYS	1.9 km	MPC · JPL
289261	2004 XD_{107}	—	December 11, 2004	Catalina	CSS	3:2	6.1 km	MPC · JPL
289262	2004 XO_{111}	—	December 14, 2004	Kitt Peak	Spacewatch	·	1.2 km	MPC · JPL
289263	2004 XZ_{119}	—	December 12, 2004	Kitt Peak	Spacewatch	NYS	1.3 km	MPC · JPL
289264	2004 XE_{121}	—	December 14, 2004	Socorro	LINEAR	·	970 m	MPC · JPL
289265	2004 XW_{123}	—	December 10, 2004	Socorro	LINEAR	MAS	840 m	MPC · JPL
289266	2004 XC_{124}	—	December 10, 2004	Socorro	LINEAR	PHO	1.5 km	MPC · JPL
289267	2004 XY_{124}	—	December 11, 2004	Kitt Peak	Spacewatch	·	3.3 km	MPC · JPL
289268	2004 XX_{127}	—	December 14, 2004	Socorro	LINEAR	·	1.5 km	MPC · JPL
289269	2004 XL_{142}	—	December 2, 2004	Palomar	NEAT	·	2.8 km	MPC · JPL
289270	2004 XW_{142}	—	December 9, 2004	Kitt Peak	Spacewatch	·	4.1 km	MPC · JPL
289271	2004 XA_{144}	—	December 12, 2004	Campo Imperatore	CINEOS	·	2.4 km	MPC · JPL
289272	2004 XB_{147}	—	December 14, 2004	Bergisch Gladbach	W. Bickel	·	1.0 km	MPC · JPL
289273	2004 XV_{147}	—	December 14, 2004	Anderson Mesa	LONEOS	·	1.1 km	MPC · JPL
289274	2004 XH_{148}	—	December 15, 2004	Campo Imperatore	CINEOS	(2076)	1.1 km	MPC · JPL
289275	2004 XC_{149}	—	December 14, 2004	Campo Imperatore	CINEOS	·	3.7 km	MPC · JPL
289276	2004 XM_{149}	—	December 15, 2004	Kitt Peak	Spacewatch	MAS	740 m	MPC · JPL
289277	2004 XD_{151}	—	December 15, 2004	Kitt Peak	Spacewatch	VER	4.2 km	MPC · JPL
289278	2004 XD_{161}	—	December 14, 2004	Kitt Peak	Spacewatch	·	950 m	MPC · JPL
289279	2004 XP_{161}	—	December 15, 2004	Socorro	LINEAR	·	1.9 km	MPC · JPL
289280	2004 XT_{161}	—	December 15, 2004	Socorro	LINEAR	·	1.8 km	MPC · JPL
289281	2004 XT_{162}	—	December 15, 2004	Catalina	CSS	·	3.8 km	MPC · JPL
289282	2004 XB_{167}	—	December 2, 2004	Palomar	NEAT	·	1.5 km	MPC · JPL
289283	2004 XL_{171}	—	December 10, 2004	Kitt Peak	Spacewatch	·	1.7 km	MPC · JPL
289284	2004 XH_{179}	—	December 14, 2004	Anderson Mesa	LONEOS	·	1.7 km	MPC · JPL
289285	2004 XZ_{181}	—	December 15, 2004	Kitt Peak	Spacewatch	L5	15 km	MPC · JPL
289286	2004 XG_{186}	—	December 14, 2004	Kitt Peak	Spacewatch	·	750 m	MPC · JPL
289287	2004 YS_{2}	—	December 16, 2004	Socorro	LINEAR	·	2.4 km	MPC · JPL
289288	2004 YK_{6}	—	December 18, 2004	Mount Lemmon	Mount Lemmon Survey	·	1.6 km	MPC · JPL
289289	2004 YD_{11}	—	December 18, 2004	Mount Lemmon	Mount Lemmon Survey	NAE	4.5 km	MPC · JPL
289290	2004 YB_{16}	—	December 18, 2004	Mount Lemmon	Mount Lemmon Survey	MAS	1.1 km	MPC · JPL
289291	2004 YQ_{16}	—	December 18, 2004	Mount Lemmon	Mount Lemmon Survey	·	1.2 km	MPC · JPL
289292	2004 YP_{17}	—	December 18, 2004	Mount Lemmon	Mount Lemmon Survey	·	1.6 km	MPC · JPL
289293	2004 YZ_{17}	—	December 18, 2004	Mount Lemmon	Mount Lemmon Survey	·	1.4 km	MPC · JPL
289294	2004 YO_{18}	—	December 18, 2004	Mount Lemmon	Mount Lemmon Survey	·	3.6 km	MPC · JPL
289295	2004 YT_{19}	—	December 18, 2004	Mount Lemmon	Mount Lemmon Survey	NYS	1.6 km	MPC · JPL
289296	2004 YO_{24}	—	December 16, 2004	Kitt Peak	Spacewatch	·	3.1 km	MPC · JPL
289297	2004 YK_{25}	—	December 18, 2004	Mount Lemmon	Mount Lemmon Survey	·	1.9 km	MPC · JPL
289298	2004 YV_{29}	—	December 16, 2004	Anderson Mesa	LONEOS	·	2.4 km	MPC · JPL
289299	2005 AH_{1}	—	January 1, 2005	Catalina	CSS	·	1.6 km	MPC · JPL
289300	2005 AX_{2}	—	January 6, 2005	Catalina	CSS	·	870 m	MPC · JPL

== 289301–289400 ==
back to top

Designation			Discovery			Properties		Ref
Permanent	Provisional	Named after	Date	Site	Discoverer(s)	Category	Diam.	Ref
289301	2005 AM_{3}	—	January 6, 2005	Socorro	LINEAR	·	1.2 km	MPC · JPL
289302	2005 AY_{3}	—	January 1, 2005	Catalina	CSS	·	2.3 km	MPC · JPL
289303	2005 AX_{6}	—	January 6, 2005	Catalina	CSS	·	2.3 km	MPC · JPL
289304	2005 AW_{10}	—	January 6, 2005	Socorro	LINEAR	PHO	4.3 km	MPC · JPL
289305	2005 AY_{10}	—	January 6, 2005	Catalina	CSS	·	2.8 km	MPC · JPL
289306	2005 AH_{11}	—	January 1, 2005	Catalina	CSS	·	2.1 km	MPC · JPL
289307	2005 AH_{13}	—	January 6, 2005	Socorro	LINEAR	MIS	2.8 km	MPC · JPL
289308	2005 AF_{15}	—	January 7, 2005	Socorro	LINEAR	·	1.8 km	MPC · JPL
289309	2005 AA_{16}	—	January 6, 2005	Socorro	LINEAR	·	1.8 km	MPC · JPL
289310	2005 AR_{16}	—	January 6, 2005	Socorro	LINEAR	·	2.6 km	MPC · JPL
289311	2005 AP_{17}	—	January 6, 2005	Socorro	LINEAR	EUN	1.7 km	MPC · JPL
289312	2005 AX_{17}	—	January 6, 2005	Socorro	LINEAR	·	2.0 km	MPC · JPL
289313	2005 AZ_{21}	—	January 6, 2005	Socorro	LINEAR	·	2.0 km	MPC · JPL
289314 Chisholm	2005 AS_{23}	Chisholm	October 16, 2003	Palomar	NEAT	·	4.2 km	MPC · JPL
289315	2005 AN_{26}	—	January 13, 2005	Catalina	CSS	APO · PHA	710 m	MPC · JPL
289316	2005 AT_{26}	—	January 13, 2005	Catalina	CSS	·	2.6 km	MPC · JPL
289317	2005 AE_{28}	—	January 13, 2005	Vicques	M. Ory	·	1.5 km	MPC · JPL
289318	2005 AF_{28}	—	January 13, 2005	Vicques	M. Ory	·	3.5 km	MPC · JPL
289319	2005 AJ_{42}	—	January 15, 2005	Catalina	CSS	·	4.2 km	MPC · JPL
289320	2005 AP_{42}	—	January 15, 2005	Catalina	CSS	·	1.5 km	MPC · JPL
289321	2005 AN_{45}	—	January 13, 2005	Catalina	CSS	·	1.7 km	MPC · JPL
289322	2005 AS_{45}	—	January 15, 2005	Catalina	CSS	H	650 m	MPC · JPL
289323	2005 AZ_{46}	—	January 11, 2005	Socorro	LINEAR	·	1.8 km	MPC · JPL
289324	2005 AB_{48}	—	January 13, 2005	Kitt Peak	Spacewatch	MAR	1.4 km	MPC · JPL
289325	2005 AX_{49}	—	January 13, 2005	Socorro	LINEAR	·	1.9 km	MPC · JPL
289326	2005 AY_{49}	—	January 13, 2005	Catalina	CSS	·	2.0 km	MPC · JPL
289327	2005 AZ_{51}	—	January 13, 2005	Kitt Peak	Spacewatch	L5	10 km	MPC · JPL
289328	2005 AK_{53}	—	January 13, 2005	Socorro	LINEAR	RAF	1.3 km	MPC · JPL
289329	2005 AE_{57}	—	January 15, 2005	Anderson Mesa	LONEOS	EUN	1.7 km	MPC · JPL
289330	2005 AS_{58}	—	January 15, 2005	Socorro	LINEAR	PHO	1.2 km	MPC · JPL
289331	2005 AX_{63}	—	January 13, 2005	Kitt Peak	Spacewatch	·	820 m	MPC · JPL
289332	2005 AE_{66}	—	January 13, 2005	Kitt Peak	Spacewatch	WIT	1.3 km	MPC · JPL
289333	2005 AF_{68}	—	January 13, 2005	Catalina	CSS	·	2.0 km	MPC · JPL
289334	2005 AG_{72}	—	January 15, 2005	Kitt Peak	Spacewatch	·	1.3 km	MPC · JPL
289335	2005 AY_{78}	—	January 15, 2005	Kitt Peak	Spacewatch	·	2.3 km	MPC · JPL
289336	2005 AM_{80}	—	January 15, 2005	Kitt Peak	Spacewatch	MAS	840 m	MPC · JPL
289337	2005 AN_{81}	—	January 15, 2005	Catalina	CSS	JUN	900 m	MPC · JPL
289338	2005 AC_{82}	—	January 13, 2005	Kitt Peak	Spacewatch	LIX	3.9 km	MPC · JPL
289339	2005 AD_{82}	—	January 15, 2005	Kitt Peak	Spacewatch	·	2.3 km	MPC · JPL
289340	2005 AM_{82}	—	January 13, 2005	Kitt Peak	Spacewatch	·	1.2 km	MPC · JPL
289341	2005 BH_{3}	—	January 16, 2005	Anderson Mesa	LONEOS	·	1.9 km	MPC · JPL
289342	2005 BQ_{4}	—	January 16, 2005	Socorro	LINEAR	·	1.3 km	MPC · JPL
289343	2005 BE_{5}	—	January 16, 2005	Socorro	LINEAR	NYS	1.6 km	MPC · JPL
289344	2005 BD_{6}	—	January 16, 2005	Socorro	LINEAR	·	1.4 km	MPC · JPL
289345	2005 BZ_{8}	—	January 16, 2005	Socorro	LINEAR	NYS	1.7 km	MPC · JPL
289346	2005 BH_{9}	—	January 16, 2005	Socorro	LINEAR	·	4.6 km	MPC · JPL
289347	2005 BR_{9}	—	January 16, 2005	Socorro	LINEAR	·	1.7 km	MPC · JPL
289348	2005 BO_{13}	—	January 17, 2005	Kitt Peak	Spacewatch	·	1.6 km	MPC · JPL
289349	2005 BP_{15}	—	January 16, 2005	Kitt Peak	Spacewatch	KON	3.2 km	MPC · JPL
289350	2005 BM_{16}	—	January 16, 2005	Socorro	LINEAR	·	1.8 km	MPC · JPL
289351	2005 BA_{17}	—	January 16, 2005	Kitt Peak	Spacewatch	·	1.2 km	MPC · JPL
289352	2005 BL_{17}	—	January 16, 2005	Kitt Peak	Spacewatch	·	1.2 km	MPC · JPL
289353	2005 BF_{19}	—	January 16, 2005	Socorro	LINEAR	(5)	1.7 km	MPC · JPL
289354	2005 BG_{19}	—	January 16, 2005	Socorro	LINEAR	·	4.6 km	MPC · JPL
289355	2005 BF_{25}	—	January 18, 2005	Kitt Peak	Spacewatch	AEO	1.3 km	MPC · JPL
289356	2005 BU_{25}	—	January 18, 2005	Catalina	CSS	·	2.1 km	MPC · JPL
289357	2005 BA_{28}	—	January 31, 2005	Socorro	LINEAR	H	760 m	MPC · JPL
289358	2005 BT_{28}	—	January 31, 2005	Palomar	NEAT	·	2.7 km	MPC · JPL
289359	2005 BQ_{29}	—	January 31, 2005	Anderson Mesa	LONEOS	·	2.0 km	MPC · JPL
289360	2005 BB_{39}	—	January 16, 2005	Mauna Kea	Veillet, C.	·	860 m	MPC · JPL
289361	2005 BZ_{41}	—	January 16, 2005	Mauna Kea	Veillet, C.	·	560 m	MPC · JPL
289362	2005 BR_{48}	—	January 19, 2005	Kitt Peak	Spacewatch	CYB	5.8 km	MPC · JPL
289363	2005 BC_{49}	—	January 18, 2005	Mayhill	Lowe, A.	·	1.8 km	MPC · JPL
289364	2005 BR_{49}	—	January 18, 2005	Catalina	CSS	·	1.6 km	MPC · JPL
289365	2005 CP_{3}	—	February 1, 2005	Kitt Peak	Spacewatch	·	1.6 km	MPC · JPL
289366	2005 CY_{3}	—	February 1, 2005	Kitt Peak	Spacewatch	·	890 m	MPC · JPL
289367	2005 CA_{4}	—	February 1, 2005	Kitt Peak	Spacewatch	(5)	1.8 km	MPC · JPL
289368	2005 CD_{8}	—	February 1, 2005	Catalina	CSS	·	970 m	MPC · JPL
289369	2005 CO_{8}	—	February 1, 2005	Palomar	NEAT	·	1.2 km	MPC · JPL
289370	2005 CG_{9}	—	February 1, 2005	Kitt Peak	Spacewatch	·	1.7 km	MPC · JPL
289371	2005 CZ_{10}	—	February 1, 2005	Kitt Peak	Spacewatch	·	4.2 km	MPC · JPL
289372	2005 CN_{11}	—	February 1, 2005	Kitt Peak	Spacewatch	·	1.3 km	MPC · JPL
289373	2005 CK_{13}	—	February 2, 2005	Kitt Peak	Spacewatch	·	930 m	MPC · JPL
289374	2005 CL_{13}	—	February 2, 2005	Kitt Peak	Spacewatch	·	1.3 km	MPC · JPL
289375	2005 CX_{13}	—	February 2, 2005	Kitt Peak	Spacewatch	EUP	4.3 km	MPC · JPL
289376	2005 CA_{15}	—	February 2, 2005	Kitt Peak	Spacewatch	·	1.7 km	MPC · JPL
289377	2005 CM_{16}	—	February 2, 2005	Socorro	LINEAR	·	1.1 km	MPC · JPL
289378	2005 CG_{17}	—	February 2, 2005	Socorro	LINEAR	·	620 m	MPC · JPL
289379	2005 CG_{21}	—	February 2, 2005	Catalina	CSS	·	980 m	MPC · JPL
289380	2005 CU_{23}	—	February 2, 2005	Palomar	NEAT	·	1.8 km	MPC · JPL
289381	2005 CP_{24}	—	February 4, 2005	Palomar	NEAT	V	820 m	MPC · JPL
289382	2005 CX_{24}	—	February 4, 2005	Catalina	CSS	KON	4.3 km	MPC · JPL
289383	2005 CO_{26}	—	February 1, 2005	Catalina	CSS	·	780 m	MPC · JPL
289384	2005 CU_{26}	—	February 1, 2005	Kitt Peak	Spacewatch	·	2.7 km	MPC · JPL
289385	2005 CO_{28}	—	February 1, 2005	Kitt Peak	Spacewatch	·	1.1 km	MPC · JPL
289386	2005 CX_{29}	—	February 1, 2005	Kitt Peak	Spacewatch	AGN	1.6 km	MPC · JPL
289387	2005 CE_{30}	—	February 1, 2005	Kitt Peak	Spacewatch	NYS	1.4 km	MPC · JPL
289388	2005 CT_{32}	—	February 2, 2005	Kitt Peak	Spacewatch	·	2.2 km	MPC · JPL
289389	2005 CZ_{33}	—	February 2, 2005	Kitt Peak	Spacewatch	·	920 m	MPC · JPL
289390	2005 CY_{34}	—	February 2, 2005	Kitt Peak	Spacewatch	·	2.2 km	MPC · JPL
289391	2005 CJ_{36}	—	February 3, 2005	Socorro	LINEAR	·	940 m	MPC · JPL
289392	2005 CP_{36}	—	February 3, 2005	Socorro	LINEAR	(5)	1.1 km	MPC · JPL
289393	2005 CL_{37}	—	February 1, 2005	Kitt Peak	Spacewatch	·	1.1 km	MPC · JPL
289394	2005 CJ_{38}	—	February 2, 2005	Kitt Peak	Spacewatch	H	550 m	MPC · JPL
289395	2005 CH_{40}	—	February 8, 2005	Bareggio	Bareggio	·	3.8 km	MPC · JPL
289396	2005 CB_{41}	—	February 9, 2005	La Silla	A. Boattini, H. Scholl	·	820 m	MPC · JPL
289397	2005 CX_{43}	—	February 2, 2005	Catalina	CSS	MAS	760 m	MPC · JPL
289398	2005 CJ_{44}	—	February 2, 2005	Kitt Peak	Spacewatch	·	2.4 km	MPC · JPL
289399	2005 CH_{46}	—	February 2, 2005	Kitt Peak	Spacewatch	·	6.0 km	MPC · JPL
289400	2005 CM_{46}	—	February 2, 2005	Kitt Peak	Spacewatch	·	860 m	MPC · JPL

== 289401–289500 ==
back to top

Designation			Discovery			Properties		Ref
Permanent	Provisional	Named after	Date	Site	Discoverer(s)	Category	Diam.	Ref
289401	2005 CG_{47}	—	February 2, 2005	Kitt Peak	Spacewatch	NYS	1.1 km	MPC · JPL
289402	2005 CM_{48}	—	February 2, 2005	Socorro	LINEAR	·	1.6 km	MPC · JPL
289403	2005 CK_{50}	—	February 2, 2005	Socorro	LINEAR	·	2.0 km	MPC · JPL
289404	2005 CT_{50}	—	February 2, 2005	Socorro	LINEAR	·	2.0 km	MPC · JPL
289405	2005 CM_{52}	—	February 3, 2005	Socorro	LINEAR	·	1.4 km	MPC · JPL
289406	2005 CK_{58}	—	February 2, 2005	Catalina	CSS	·	880 m	MPC · JPL
289407	2005 CX_{58}	—	February 2, 2005	Catalina	CSS	·	1.8 km	MPC · JPL
289408	2005 CR_{59}	—	February 2, 2005	Socorro	LINEAR	·	1.0 km	MPC · JPL
289409	2005 CS_{60}	—	February 4, 2005	Mount Lemmon	Mount Lemmon Survey	·	1.8 km	MPC · JPL
289410	2005 CN_{65}	—	February 9, 2005	Socorro	LINEAR	·	820 m	MPC · JPL
289411	2005 CE_{72}	—	February 1, 2005	Kitt Peak	Spacewatch	EUN	1.8 km	MPC · JPL
289412	2005 CT_{73}	—	February 1, 2005	Kitt Peak	Spacewatch	·	760 m	MPC · JPL
289413	2005 CL_{74}	—	February 2, 2005	Kitt Peak	Spacewatch	·	2.9 km	MPC · JPL
289414	2005 CM_{75}	—	February 2, 2005	Kitt Peak	Spacewatch	NYS	1.2 km	MPC · JPL
289415	2005 CW_{79}	—	February 2, 2005	Palomar	NEAT	·	2.3 km	MPC · JPL
289416	2005 CY_{80}	—	February 3, 2005	Palomar	NEAT	·	2.7 km	MPC · JPL
289417	2005 DF	—	February 17, 2005	La Silla	A. Boattini, H. Scholl	·	1.3 km	MPC · JPL
289418	2005 DP_{3}	—	February 17, 2005	La Silla	A. Boattini, H. Scholl	KOR	1.3 km	MPC · JPL
289419	2005 EW_{2}	—	March 1, 2005	Kitt Peak	Spacewatch	·	690 m	MPC · JPL
289420	2005 EB_{5}	—	March 1, 2005	Kitt Peak	Spacewatch	·	1.8 km	MPC · JPL
289421	2005 EK_{7}	—	March 1, 2005	Kitt Peak	Spacewatch	MAS	730 m	MPC · JPL
289422	2005 ER_{8}	—	March 2, 2005	Kitt Peak	Spacewatch	·	1.3 km	MPC · JPL
289423	2005 EX_{8}	—	March 2, 2005	Kitt Peak	Spacewatch	·	2.5 km	MPC · JPL
289424	2005 EQ_{12}	—	March 2, 2005	Catalina	CSS	·	2.5 km	MPC · JPL
289425	2005 EL_{13}	—	March 3, 2005	Kitt Peak	Spacewatch	·	1.4 km	MPC · JPL
289426	2005 EW_{13}	—	March 3, 2005	Kitt Peak	Spacewatch	·	1.3 km	MPC · JPL
289427	2005 EY_{13}	—	March 3, 2005	Kitt Peak	Spacewatch	·	1.4 km	MPC · JPL
289428	2005 EA_{19}	—	March 3, 2005	Kitt Peak	Spacewatch	V	620 m	MPC · JPL
289429	2005 ED_{19}	—	March 3, 2005	Kitt Peak	Spacewatch	·	1.6 km	MPC · JPL
289430	2005 EJ_{22}	—	March 3, 2005	Catalina	CSS	·	1.5 km	MPC · JPL
289431	2005 EJ_{25}	—	March 3, 2005	Catalina	CSS	·	1.4 km	MPC · JPL
289432	2005 EW_{25}	—	March 3, 2005	Catalina	CSS	·	3.0 km	MPC · JPL
289433	2005 EA_{26}	—	March 3, 2005	Catalina	CSS	V	940 m	MPC · JPL
289434	2005 ED_{26}	—	March 3, 2005	Catalina	CSS	H	750 m	MPC · JPL
289435	2005 EL_{29}	—	March 3, 2005	Catalina	CSS	·	1.3 km	MPC · JPL
289436	2005 EU_{29}	—	March 2, 2005	Calvin-Rehoboth	Calvin College	·	1.1 km	MPC · JPL
289437	2005 EE_{30}	—	March 2, 2005	Kitt Peak	Spacewatch	·	1.2 km	MPC · JPL
289438	2005 EF_{33}	—	March 2, 2005	Socorro	LINEAR	(116763)	2.4 km	MPC · JPL
289439	2005 EM_{33}	—	March 4, 2005	Socorro	LINEAR	H	550 m	MPC · JPL
289440	2005 EQ_{34}	—	March 3, 2005	Catalina	CSS	·	1.6 km	MPC · JPL
289441	2005 EL_{35}	—	March 4, 2005	Catalina	CSS	·	2.5 km	MPC · JPL
289442	2005 EG_{39}	—	March 8, 2005	Mount Lemmon	Mount Lemmon Survey	·	940 m	MPC · JPL
289443	2005 EE_{40}	—	March 1, 2005	Kitt Peak	Spacewatch	·	880 m	MPC · JPL
289444	2005 EH_{41}	—	March 1, 2005	Catalina	CSS	·	2.6 km	MPC · JPL
289445	2005 EF_{42}	—	March 2, 2005	Kitt Peak	Spacewatch	(5)	1.9 km	MPC · JPL
289446	2005 EW_{42}	—	March 3, 2005	Kitt Peak	Spacewatch	T_{j} (2.99) · 3:2	12 km	MPC · JPL
289447	2005 EN_{45}	—	March 3, 2005	Catalina	CSS	·	1.4 km	MPC · JPL
289448	2005 EW_{46}	—	March 3, 2005	Catalina	CSS	·	1.0 km	MPC · JPL
289449	2005 EF_{48}	—	March 3, 2005	Catalina	CSS	·	880 m	MPC · JPL
289450	2005 EW_{48}	—	March 3, 2005	Catalina	CSS	·	1.7 km	MPC · JPL
289451	2005 EO_{53}	—	March 4, 2005	Kitt Peak	Spacewatch	MAS	900 m	MPC · JPL
289452	2005 EN_{54}	—	March 4, 2005	Kitt Peak	Spacewatch	·	1.5 km	MPC · JPL
289453	2005 EL_{55}	—	March 4, 2005	Kitt Peak	Spacewatch	BRG	2.0 km	MPC · JPL
289454	2005 EG_{56}	—	March 4, 2005	Kitt Peak	Spacewatch	·	2.2 km	MPC · JPL
289455	2005 EW_{58}	—	March 4, 2005	Kitt Peak	Spacewatch	·	1.3 km	MPC · JPL
289456	2005 EL_{60}	—	March 4, 2005	Catalina	CSS	·	1.5 km	MPC · JPL
289457	2005 ER_{60}	—	March 4, 2005	Catalina	CSS	·	800 m	MPC · JPL
289458	2005 EB_{61}	—	March 4, 2005	Catalina	CSS	·	3.6 km	MPC · JPL
289459	2005 ET_{63}	—	March 4, 2005	Mount Lemmon	Mount Lemmon Survey	·	1.2 km	MPC · JPL
289460	2005 EY_{63}	—	March 4, 2005	Mount Lemmon	Mount Lemmon Survey	·	2.0 km	MPC · JPL
289461	2005 EZ_{63}	—	March 4, 2005	Mount Lemmon	Mount Lemmon Survey	MAS	720 m	MPC · JPL
289462	2005 EB_{66}	—	March 4, 2005	Mount Lemmon	Mount Lemmon Survey	·	1.8 km	MPC · JPL
289463	2005 EJ_{66}	—	March 4, 2005	Catalina	CSS	·	2.0 km	MPC · JPL
289464	2005 EW_{66}	—	March 4, 2005	Mount Lemmon	Mount Lemmon Survey	·	1.1 km	MPC · JPL
289465	2005 EC_{68}	—	March 7, 2005	Socorro	LINEAR	·	4.3 km	MPC · JPL
289466	2005 EK_{68}	—	March 7, 2005	Socorro	LINEAR	·	2.7 km	MPC · JPL
289467	2005 EU_{68}	—	March 7, 2005	Socorro	LINEAR	·	1.5 km	MPC · JPL
289468	2005 EH_{69}	—	March 7, 2005	Socorro	LINEAR	·	890 m	MPC · JPL
289469	2005 EU_{69}	—	March 7, 2005	Socorro	LINEAR	H	570 m	MPC · JPL
289470	2005 ER_{72}	—	March 2, 2005	Catalina	CSS	V	930 m	MPC · JPL
289471	2005 EA_{73}	—	March 2, 2005	Catalina	CSS	·	1.0 km	MPC · JPL
289472	2005 ER_{73}	—	March 3, 2005	Kitt Peak	Spacewatch	·	850 m	MPC · JPL
289473	2005 EJ_{75}	—	March 3, 2005	Kitt Peak	Spacewatch	·	2.0 km	MPC · JPL
289474	2005 EV_{75}	—	March 3, 2005	Kitt Peak	Spacewatch	KOR	1.4 km	MPC · JPL
289475	2005 EH_{78}	—	March 3, 2005	Catalina	CSS	·	1.9 km	MPC · JPL
289476	2005 EV_{78}	—	March 3, 2005	Catalina	CSS	·	1.6 km	MPC · JPL
289477	2005 EN_{79}	—	March 3, 2005	Catalina	CSS	·	1.4 km	MPC · JPL
289478	2005 EL_{80}	—	March 3, 2005	Catalina	CSS	·	1.6 km	MPC · JPL
289479	2005 EG_{83}	—	March 4, 2005	Kitt Peak	Spacewatch	MAS	960 m	MPC · JPL
289480	2005 EH_{83}	—	March 4, 2005	Kitt Peak	Spacewatch	MAR	1.2 km	MPC · JPL
289481	2005 EL_{83}	—	March 4, 2005	Kitt Peak	Spacewatch	·	910 m	MPC · JPL
289482	2005 EK_{84}	—	March 4, 2005	Socorro	LINEAR	ADE	2.9 km	MPC · JPL
289483	2005 EK_{87}	—	March 4, 2005	Mount Lemmon	Mount Lemmon Survey	·	840 m	MPC · JPL
289484	2005 EB_{88}	—	March 7, 2005	Socorro	LINEAR	GEF · slow	1.8 km	MPC · JPL
289485	2005 EB_{90}	—	March 8, 2005	Anderson Mesa	LONEOS	·	1.5 km	MPC · JPL
289486	2005 EH_{92}	—	March 8, 2005	Anderson Mesa	LONEOS	DOR	4.3 km	MPC · JPL
289487	2005 EX_{96}	—	March 3, 2005	Catalina	CSS	·	2.2 km	MPC · JPL
289488	2005 EB_{101}	—	March 3, 2005	Catalina	CSS	·	3.3 km	MPC · JPL
289489	2005 EH_{105}	—	March 4, 2005	Mount Lemmon	Mount Lemmon Survey	·	1.0 km	MPC · JPL
289490	2005 EC_{107}	—	March 4, 2005	Catalina	CSS	·	2.6 km	MPC · JPL
289491	2005 EF_{109}	—	March 4, 2005	Catalina	CSS	·	3.1 km	MPC · JPL
289492	2005 EK_{110}	—	March 4, 2005	Socorro	LINEAR	·	4.1 km	MPC · JPL
289493	2005 EN_{112}	—	March 4, 2005	Socorro	LINEAR	·	1.9 km	MPC · JPL
289494	2005 EO_{116}	—	March 4, 2005	Mount Lemmon	Mount Lemmon Survey	·	1.0 km	MPC · JPL
289495	2005 EG_{120}	—	March 8, 2005	Kitt Peak	Spacewatch	·	1.6 km	MPC · JPL
289496	2005 ES_{127}	—	March 9, 2005	Kitt Peak	Spacewatch	·	1.8 km	MPC · JPL
289497	2005 EU_{128}	—	March 9, 2005	Anderson Mesa	LONEOS	·	1.1 km	MPC · JPL
289498	2005 EY_{128}	—	March 9, 2005	Kitt Peak	Spacewatch	·	1.1 km	MPC · JPL
289499	2005 EC_{131}	—	March 9, 2005	Mount Lemmon	Mount Lemmon Survey	HOF	3.0 km	MPC · JPL
289500	2005 ED_{132}	—	March 9, 2005	Catalina	CSS	·	2.6 km	MPC · JPL

== 289501–289600 ==
back to top

Designation			Discovery			Properties		Ref
Permanent	Provisional	Named after	Date	Site	Discoverer(s)	Category	Diam.	Ref
289501	2005 EJ_{133}	—	March 9, 2005	Catalina	CSS	L5	18 km	MPC · JPL
289502	2005 EL_{133}	—	March 9, 2005	Catalina	CSS	·	3.4 km	MPC · JPL
289503	2005 EO_{134}	—	March 9, 2005	Mount Lemmon	Mount Lemmon Survey	·	3.2 km	MPC · JPL
289504	2005 ED_{137}	—	March 9, 2005	Mount Lemmon	Mount Lemmon Survey	·	800 m	MPC · JPL
289505	2005 ES_{137}	—	March 9, 2005	Socorro	LINEAR	·	880 m	MPC · JPL
289506	2005 EA_{143}	—	March 10, 2005	Catalina	CSS	·	1.4 km	MPC · JPL
289507	2005 EF_{151}	—	March 10, 2005	Kitt Peak	Spacewatch	·	1.7 km	MPC · JPL
289508	2005 EJ_{153}	—	March 8, 2005	Catalina	CSS	·	2.8 km	MPC · JPL
289509	2005 ES_{154}	—	March 8, 2005	Mount Lemmon	Mount Lemmon Survey	·	1.3 km	MPC · JPL
289510	2005 EN_{160}	—	March 9, 2005	Mount Lemmon	Mount Lemmon Survey	MAS	740 m	MPC · JPL
289511	2005 EV_{161}	—	March 9, 2005	Mount Lemmon	Mount Lemmon Survey	·	750 m	MPC · JPL
289512	2005 EJ_{162}	—	March 10, 2005	Mount Lemmon	Mount Lemmon Survey	·	1.7 km	MPC · JPL
289513	2005 EO_{162}	—	March 10, 2005	Mount Lemmon	Mount Lemmon Survey	·	1.6 km	MPC · JPL
289514	2005 ES_{170}	—	March 7, 2005	Socorro	LINEAR	·	1.8 km	MPC · JPL
289515	2005 EC_{174}	—	March 8, 2005	Kitt Peak	Spacewatch	V	670 m	MPC · JPL
289516	2005 EN_{174}	—	March 8, 2005	Kitt Peak	Spacewatch	·	1.7 km	MPC · JPL
289517	2005 ES_{175}	—	March 8, 2005	Kitt Peak	Spacewatch	·	3.4 km	MPC · JPL
289518	2005 ES_{178}	—	March 9, 2005	Kitt Peak	Spacewatch	·	760 m	MPC · JPL
289519	2005 ED_{179}	—	March 9, 2005	Kitt Peak	Spacewatch	EUN	2.1 km	MPC · JPL
289520	2005 EF_{179}	—	March 9, 2005	Kitt Peak	Spacewatch	·	2.1 km	MPC · JPL
289521	2005 EY_{181}	—	March 9, 2005	Socorro	LINEAR	·	1.6 km	MPC · JPL
289522	2005 EK_{186}	—	March 10, 2005	Anderson Mesa	LONEOS	·	2.1 km	MPC · JPL
289523	2005 EL_{186}	—	March 10, 2005	Anderson Mesa	LONEOS	·	2.5 km	MPC · JPL
289524	2005 EX_{186}	—	March 10, 2005	Mount Lemmon	Mount Lemmon Survey	·	1.0 km	MPC · JPL
289525	2005 EZ_{189}	—	March 11, 2005	Mount Lemmon	Mount Lemmon Survey	(5)	1.6 km	MPC · JPL
289526	2005 EV_{191}	—	March 11, 2005	Mount Lemmon	Mount Lemmon Survey	·	1.2 km	MPC · JPL
289527	2005 EJ_{192}	—	March 11, 2005	Mount Lemmon	Mount Lemmon Survey	·	780 m	MPC · JPL
289528	2005 EQ_{194}	—	March 11, 2005	Mount Lemmon	Mount Lemmon Survey	·	2.2 km	MPC · JPL
289529	2005 EP_{196}	—	March 11, 2005	Kitt Peak	Spacewatch	·	1.4 km	MPC · JPL
289530	2005 EY_{199}	—	March 12, 2005	Mount Lemmon	Mount Lemmon Survey	V	910 m	MPC · JPL
289531	2005 EE_{200}	—	March 12, 2005	Mount Lemmon	Mount Lemmon Survey	·	720 m	MPC · JPL
289532	2005 EJ_{203}	—	March 11, 2005	Kitt Peak	Spacewatch	NAE	4.4 km	MPC · JPL
289533	2005 EL_{204}	—	March 11, 2005	Kitt Peak	Spacewatch	·	2.7 km	MPC · JPL
289534	2005 EU_{207}	—	March 13, 2005	Catalina	CSS	NYS	1.5 km	MPC · JPL
289535	2005 ET_{208}	—	March 4, 2005	Kitt Peak	Spacewatch	·	880 m	MPC · JPL
289536	2005 EW_{208}	—	March 4, 2005	Kitt Peak	Spacewatch	·	1.7 km	MPC · JPL
289537	2005 EM_{210}	—	March 4, 2005	Kitt Peak	Spacewatch	·	990 m	MPC · JPL
289538	2005 EX_{211}	—	March 4, 2005	Mount Lemmon	Mount Lemmon Survey	·	1.3 km	MPC · JPL
289539	2005 EF_{212}	—	March 4, 2005	Socorro	LINEAR	3:2	6.5 km	MPC · JPL
289540	2005 EM_{213}	—	March 4, 2005	Mount Lemmon	Mount Lemmon Survey	·	1.4 km	MPC · JPL
289541	2005 EW_{214}	—	March 8, 2005	Anderson Mesa	LONEOS	·	1.7 km	MPC · JPL
289542	2005 EC_{217}	—	March 9, 2005	Catalina	CSS	·	1.0 km	MPC · JPL
289543	2005 EO_{222}	—	March 10, 2005	Anderson Mesa	LONEOS	·	2.3 km	MPC · JPL
289544	2005 EC_{225}	—	March 13, 2005	Socorro	LINEAR	BAR	2.1 km	MPC · JPL
289545	2005 EW_{225}	—	March 9, 2005	Catalina	CSS	·	1.7 km	MPC · JPL
289546	2005 EZ_{226}	—	March 9, 2005	Mount Lemmon	Mount Lemmon Survey	LEO	1.9 km	MPC · JPL
289547	2005 EG_{227}	—	March 9, 2005	Mount Lemmon	Mount Lemmon Survey	MAS	860 m	MPC · JPL
289548	2005 EL_{230}	—	March 10, 2005	Mount Lemmon	Mount Lemmon Survey	·	720 m	MPC · JPL
289549	2005 EM_{231}	—	March 10, 2005	Mount Lemmon	Mount Lemmon Survey	·	1.1 km	MPC · JPL
289550	2005 EC_{232}	—	March 10, 2005	Mount Lemmon	Mount Lemmon Survey	·	1.3 km	MPC · JPL
289551	2005 EW_{233}	—	March 10, 2005	Anderson Mesa	LONEOS	·	1.7 km	MPC · JPL
289552	2005 EW_{237}	—	March 11, 2005	Kitt Peak	Spacewatch	·	1.8 km	MPC · JPL
289553	2005 EE_{241}	—	March 11, 2005	Catalina	CSS	·	4.1 km	MPC · JPL
289554	2005 EM_{248}	—	March 12, 2005	Kitt Peak	Spacewatch	MAS	770 m	MPC · JPL
289555	2005 EF_{250}	—	March 14, 2005	Mount Lemmon	Mount Lemmon Survey	·	2.6 km	MPC · JPL
289556	2005 EW_{251}	—	March 10, 2005	Mount Lemmon	Mount Lemmon Survey	(11882)	1.8 km	MPC · JPL
289557	2005 EO_{262}	—	March 13, 2005	Socorro	LINEAR	·	1.1 km	MPC · JPL
289558	2005 ES_{265}	—	March 13, 2005	Catalina	CSS	·	4.0 km	MPC · JPL
289559	2005 EP_{266}	—	March 13, 2005	Kitt Peak	Spacewatch	GEF	1.4 km	MPC · JPL
289560	2005 EF_{267}	—	March 13, 2005	Kitt Peak	Spacewatch	·	4.4 km	MPC · JPL
289561	2005 EW_{268}	—	March 14, 2005	Mount Lemmon	Mount Lemmon Survey	·	1.7 km	MPC · JPL
289562	2005 EU_{269}	—	March 13, 2005	Anderson Mesa	LONEOS	·	1.9 km	MPC · JPL
289563	2005 EF_{270}	—	March 12, 2005	Socorro	LINEAR	·	1.9 km	MPC · JPL
289564	2005 EL_{272}	—	March 1, 2005	Kitt Peak	Spacewatch	3:2 · SHU	7.3 km	MPC · JPL
289565	2005 EB_{281}	—	March 10, 2005	Anderson Mesa	LONEOS	·	1.9 km	MPC · JPL
289566	2005 EE_{283}	—	March 11, 2005	Kitt Peak	Spacewatch	·	4.0 km	MPC · JPL
289567	2005 EL_{289}	—	March 9, 2005	Catalina	CSS	(2076)	1.1 km	MPC · JPL
289568	2005 EN_{290}	—	March 10, 2005	Catalina	CSS	·	3.2 km	MPC · JPL
289569	2005 EY_{290}	—	March 10, 2005	Catalina	CSS	·	2.6 km	MPC · JPL
289570	2005 EE_{291}	—	March 10, 2005	Catalina	CSS	·	1.0 km	MPC · JPL
289571	2005 EN_{291}	—	March 10, 2005	Mount Lemmon	Mount Lemmon Survey	·	1.5 km	MPC · JPL
289572	2005 EJ_{292}	—	March 10, 2005	Catalina	CSS	·	2.1 km	MPC · JPL
289573	2005 EF_{307}	—	March 8, 2005	Mount Lemmon	Mount Lemmon Survey	·	2.0 km	MPC · JPL
289574	2005 EX_{309}	—	March 9, 2005	Mount Lemmon	Mount Lemmon Survey	·	1.5 km	MPC · JPL
289575	2005 EC_{312}	—	March 10, 2005	Kitt Peak	M. W. Buie	NYS	1.3 km	MPC · JPL
289576	2005 ES_{312}	—	March 10, 2005	Kitt Peak	M. W. Buie	·	1.5 km	MPC · JPL
289577	2005 EX_{315}	—	March 11, 2005	Kitt Peak	M. W. Buie	·	1.5 km	MPC · JPL
289578	2005 ET_{317}	—	March 12, 2005	Kitt Peak	M. W. Buie	·	2.0 km	MPC · JPL
289579	2005 EN_{323}	—	March 4, 2005	Mount Lemmon	Mount Lemmon Survey	·	2.0 km	MPC · JPL
289580	2005 ER_{324}	—	March 13, 2005	Mount Lemmon	Mount Lemmon Survey	·	2.4 km	MPC · JPL
289581	2005 EN_{325}	—	March 13, 2005	Catalina	CSS	(5)	1.2 km	MPC · JPL
289582	2005 FO_{1}	—	March 16, 2005	Kitt Peak	Spacewatch	·	800 m	MPC · JPL
289583	2005 FW_{2}	—	March 16, 2005	Catalina	CSS	·	850 m	MPC · JPL
289584	2005 FF_{4}	—	March 30, 2005	Vail-Jarnac	Jarnac	·	5.2 km	MPC · JPL
289585	2005 FG_{4}	—	March 30, 2005	Catalina	CSS	·	1.6 km	MPC · JPL
289586 Shackleton	2005 FZ_{4}	Shackleton	March 30, 2005	Vicques	M. Ory	NYS	1.3 km	MPC · JPL
289587 Chantdugros	2005 FB_{5}	Chantdugros	March 30, 2005	Vicques	M. Ory	·	840 m	MPC · JPL
289588	2005 FL_{5}	—	March 31, 2005	Bergisch Gladbach	W. Bickel	·	1.3 km	MPC · JPL
289589	2005 FM_{6}	—	March 30, 2005	Catalina	CSS	·	2.9 km	MPC · JPL
289590	2005 FJ_{11}	—	March 31, 2005	Kitt Peak	Spacewatch	·	3.0 km	MPC · JPL
289591	2005 FC_{13}	—	March 30, 2005	Catalina	CSS	·	3.5 km	MPC · JPL
289592	2005 FY_{14}	—	March 18, 2005	Catalina	CSS	·	3.3 km	MPC · JPL
289593	2005 GU_{2}	—	April 1, 2005	Anderson Mesa	LONEOS	·	1.2 km	MPC · JPL
289594	2005 GW_{2}	—	April 1, 2005	Anderson Mesa	LONEOS	·	1.4 km	MPC · JPL
289595	2005 GK_{5}	—	April 1, 2005	Kitt Peak	Spacewatch	·	1.3 km	MPC · JPL
289596	2005 GM_{5}	—	April 1, 2005	Kitt Peak	Spacewatch	EOS	2.1 km	MPC · JPL
289597	2005 GT_{5}	—	April 1, 2005	Kitt Peak	Spacewatch	·	1.6 km	MPC · JPL
289598	2005 GX_{6}	—	April 1, 2005	Kitt Peak	Spacewatch	·	1.9 km	MPC · JPL
289599	2005 GH_{9}	—	April 3, 2005	Socorro	LINEAR	·	3.2 km	MPC · JPL
289600 Tastevin	2005 GR_{9}	Tastevin	April 1, 2005	Vicques	M. Ory	EOS	3.4 km	MPC · JPL

== 289601–289700 ==
back to top

Designation			Discovery			Properties		Ref
Permanent	Provisional	Named after	Date	Site	Discoverer(s)	Category	Diam.	Ref
289601	2005 GJ_{10}	—	April 1, 2005	Kitt Peak	Spacewatch	·	1.4 km	MPC · JPL
289602	2005 GU_{10}	—	April 1, 2005	Kitt Peak	Spacewatch	NYS	1.3 km	MPC · JPL
289603	2005 GA_{12}	—	April 1, 2005	Anderson Mesa	LONEOS	·	1.2 km	MPC · JPL
289604	2005 GF_{17}	—	April 2, 2005	Mount Lemmon	Mount Lemmon Survey	·	690 m	MPC · JPL
289605	2005 GZ_{18}	—	April 2, 2005	Palomar	NEAT	AGN	1.5 km	MPC · JPL
289606	2005 GB_{19}	—	April 2, 2005	Palomar	NEAT	·	2.6 km	MPC · JPL
289607	2005 GA_{21}	—	April 3, 2005	Palomar	NEAT	·	1.9 km	MPC · JPL
289608 Wanli	2005 GB_{22}	Wanli	April 4, 2005	San Marcello	L. Tesi, Fagioli, G.	·	1.4 km	MPC · JPL
289609	2005 GS_{23}	—	April 1, 2005	Anderson Mesa	LONEOS	EUN	1.7 km	MPC · JPL
289610	2005 GP_{24}	—	April 2, 2005	Mount Lemmon	Mount Lemmon Survey	·	1.5 km	MPC · JPL
289611	2005 GW_{25}	—	April 2, 2005	Mount Lemmon	Mount Lemmon Survey	·	1.9 km	MPC · JPL
289612	2005 GM_{27}	—	April 3, 2005	Palomar	NEAT	·	5.0 km	MPC · JPL
289613	2005 GU_{27}	—	April 3, 2005	Palomar	NEAT	·	1.6 km	MPC · JPL
289614	2005 GZ_{27}	—	April 3, 2005	Palomar	NEAT	·	1.6 km	MPC · JPL
289615	2005 GX_{28}	—	April 4, 2005	Kitt Peak	Spacewatch	·	870 m	MPC · JPL
289616	2005 GP_{30}	—	April 4, 2005	Mount Lemmon	Mount Lemmon Survey	EUN	960 m	MPC · JPL
289617	2005 GY_{30}	—	April 4, 2005	Mount Lemmon	Mount Lemmon Survey	·	2.7 km	MPC · JPL
289618	2005 GE_{32}	—	April 4, 2005	Catalina	CSS	·	710 m	MPC · JPL
289619	2005 GO_{34}	—	April 1, 2005	Anderson Mesa	LONEOS	LIX	4.8 km	MPC · JPL
289620	2005 GK_{38}	—	April 3, 2005	Siding Spring	SSS	·	1.2 km	MPC · JPL
289621	2005 GC_{46}	—	April 5, 2005	Mount Lemmon	Mount Lemmon Survey	·	2.7 km	MPC · JPL
289622	2005 GU_{46}	—	April 5, 2005	Mount Lemmon	Mount Lemmon Survey	·	2.6 km	MPC · JPL
289623	2005 GD_{49}	—	April 5, 2005	Mount Lemmon	Mount Lemmon Survey	·	1.6 km	MPC · JPL
289624	2005 GS_{51}	—	April 2, 2005	Palomar	NEAT	·	1.7 km	MPC · JPL
289625	2005 GY_{52}	—	April 2, 2005	Mount Lemmon	Mount Lemmon Survey	·	1.9 km	MPC · JPL
289626	2005 GZ_{52}	—	April 2, 2005	Mount Lemmon	Mount Lemmon Survey	KOR	1.7 km	MPC · JPL
289627	2005 GS_{55}	—	April 6, 2005	Palomar	NEAT	EOS	2.6 km	MPC · JPL
289628	2005 GV_{57}	—	April 6, 2005	Mount Lemmon	Mount Lemmon Survey	NYS	1.4 km	MPC · JPL
289629	2005 GR_{61}	—	April 2, 2005	Kitt Peak	Spacewatch	·	2.1 km	MPC · JPL
289630	2005 GM_{62}	—	April 2, 2005	Mount Lemmon	Mount Lemmon Survey	·	910 m	MPC · JPL
289631	2005 GO_{72}	—	April 4, 2005	Catalina	CSS	·	760 m	MPC · JPL
289632	2005 GM_{76}	—	April 5, 2005	Palomar	NEAT	·	980 m	MPC · JPL
289633	2005 GX_{76}	—	April 5, 2005	Mount Lemmon	Mount Lemmon Survey	·	1.2 km	MPC · JPL
289634	2005 GQ_{78}	—	April 6, 2005	Catalina	CSS	·	3.5 km	MPC · JPL
289635	2005 GW_{82}	—	April 4, 2005	Mount Lemmon	Mount Lemmon Survey	·	1.7 km	MPC · JPL
289636	2005 GS_{88}	—	April 5, 2005	Mount Lemmon	Mount Lemmon Survey	·	1.7 km	MPC · JPL
289637	2005 GF_{89}	—	April 5, 2005	Mount Lemmon	Mount Lemmon Survey	·	1.1 km	MPC · JPL
289638	2005 GG_{91}	—	April 6, 2005	Kitt Peak	Spacewatch	·	3.7 km	MPC · JPL
289639	2005 GT_{91}	—	April 6, 2005	Kitt Peak	Spacewatch	·	1.5 km	MPC · JPL
289640	2005 GQ_{92}	—	April 6, 2005	Palomar	NEAT	·	3.4 km	MPC · JPL
289641	2005 GS_{92}	—	April 6, 2005	Mount Lemmon	Mount Lemmon Survey	THM	2.9 km	MPC · JPL
289642	2005 GQ_{93}	—	April 6, 2005	Kitt Peak	Spacewatch	·	1.3 km	MPC · JPL
289643	2005 GU_{97}	—	April 7, 2005	Kitt Peak	Spacewatch	·	860 m	MPC · JPL
289644	2005 GM_{100}	—	April 9, 2005	Mount Lemmon	Mount Lemmon Survey	NYS	1.2 km	MPC · JPL
289645	2005 GH_{103}	—	April 9, 2005	Mount Lemmon	Mount Lemmon Survey	T_{j} (2.93)	2.5 km	MPC · JPL
289646	2005 GP_{107}	—	April 10, 2005	Mount Lemmon	Mount Lemmon Survey	·	840 m	MPC · JPL
289647	2005 GW_{107}	—	April 10, 2005	Mount Lemmon	Mount Lemmon Survey	·	1.6 km	MPC · JPL
289648	2005 GT_{108}	—	April 10, 2005	Mount Lemmon	Mount Lemmon Survey	·	1.4 km	MPC · JPL
289649	2005 GS_{109}	—	April 10, 2005	Mount Lemmon	Mount Lemmon Survey	KOR	1.5 km	MPC · JPL
289650	2005 GX_{109}	—	April 10, 2005	Mount Lemmon	Mount Lemmon Survey	·	1.2 km	MPC · JPL
289651	2005 GQ_{110}	—	April 10, 2005	Mount Lemmon	Mount Lemmon Survey	MAS	760 m	MPC · JPL
289652	2005 GB_{114}	—	April 9, 2005	Catalina	CSS	·	2.8 km	MPC · JPL
289653	2005 GE_{114}	—	April 9, 2005	Socorro	LINEAR	·	2.6 km	MPC · JPL
289654	2005 GJ_{116}	—	April 11, 2005	Kitt Peak	Spacewatch	·	1.4 km	MPC · JPL
289655	2005 GV_{116}	—	April 11, 2005	Kitt Peak	Spacewatch	NYS	970 m	MPC · JPL
289656	2005 GW_{117}	—	April 11, 2005	Mount Lemmon	Mount Lemmon Survey	·	6.4 km	MPC · JPL
289657	2005 GF_{118}	—	April 11, 2005	Mount Lemmon	Mount Lemmon Survey	MAS	800 m	MPC · JPL
289658	2005 GW_{118}	—	April 11, 2005	Mount Lemmon	Mount Lemmon Survey	·	940 m	MPC · JPL
289659	2005 GN_{120}	—	April 5, 2005	Mount Lemmon	Mount Lemmon Survey	KOR	1.7 km	MPC · JPL
289660	2005 GO_{123}	—	April 7, 2005	Kitt Peak	Spacewatch	·	3.5 km	MPC · JPL
289661	2005 GY_{124}	—	April 10, 2005	Mount Lemmon	Mount Lemmon Survey	3:2	7.1 km	MPC · JPL
289662	2005 GC_{127}	—	April 11, 2005	Mount Lemmon	Mount Lemmon Survey	·	2.3 km	MPC · JPL
289663	2005 GP_{127}	—	April 12, 2005	Mount Lemmon	Mount Lemmon Survey	NYS	1.2 km	MPC · JPL
289664	2005 GV_{127}	—	April 9, 2005	Socorro	LINEAR	·	4.1 km	MPC · JPL
289665	2005 GG_{128}	—	April 11, 2005	Anderson Mesa	LONEOS	·	2.0 km	MPC · JPL
289666	2005 GV_{131}	—	April 10, 2005	Kitt Peak	Spacewatch	·	1.7 km	MPC · JPL
289667	2005 GF_{133}	—	April 10, 2005	Kitt Peak	Spacewatch	·	2.4 km	MPC · JPL
289668	2005 GN_{137}	—	April 11, 2005	Kitt Peak	Spacewatch	·	930 m	MPC · JPL
289669	2005 GS_{137}	—	April 11, 2005	Mount Lemmon	Mount Lemmon Survey	·	2.5 km	MPC · JPL
289670	2005 GF_{139}	—	April 12, 2005	Kitt Peak	Spacewatch	·	1.8 km	MPC · JPL
289671	2005 GT_{141}	—	April 9, 2005	Socorro	LINEAR	·	1.3 km	MPC · JPL
289672	2005 GH_{143}	—	April 10, 2005	Kitt Peak	Spacewatch	·	1.6 km	MPC · JPL
289673	2005 GO_{143}	—	April 10, 2005	Kitt Peak	Spacewatch	·	3.7 km	MPC · JPL
289674	2005 GZ_{144}	—	April 11, 2005	Kitt Peak	Spacewatch	HOF	3.7 km	MPC · JPL
289675	2005 GA_{149}	—	April 11, 2005	Kitt Peak	Spacewatch	PAD	2.1 km	MPC · JPL
289676	2005 GY_{149}	—	April 11, 2005	Kitt Peak	Spacewatch	·	3.8 km	MPC · JPL
289677	2005 GD_{150}	—	April 11, 2005	Kitt Peak	Spacewatch	·	4.5 km	MPC · JPL
289678	2005 GM_{150}	—	April 11, 2005	Kitt Peak	Spacewatch	·	1.2 km	MPC · JPL
289679	2005 GN_{150}	—	April 11, 2005	Kitt Peak	Spacewatch	·	2.6 km	MPC · JPL
289680	2005 GX_{150}	—	April 11, 2005	Kitt Peak	Spacewatch	·	2.1 km	MPC · JPL
289681	2005 GW_{156}	—	April 10, 2005	Mount Lemmon	Mount Lemmon Survey	·	2.8 km	MPC · JPL
289682	2005 GG_{157}	—	April 11, 2005	Kitt Peak	Spacewatch	·	2.8 km	MPC · JPL
289683	2005 GW_{158}	—	April 12, 2005	Kitt Peak	Spacewatch	·	1.8 km	MPC · JPL
289684	2005 GH_{161}	—	April 13, 2005	Catalina	CSS	·	4.4 km	MPC · JPL
289685	2005 GV_{161}	—	April 13, 2005	Catalina	CSS	·	2.5 km	MPC · JPL
289686	2005 GZ_{162}	—	April 15, 2005	Pla D'Arguines	D'Arguines, Pla	HNS	1.5 km	MPC · JPL
289687	2005 GE_{164}	—	April 10, 2005	Mount Lemmon	Mount Lemmon Survey	·	1.1 km	MPC · JPL
289688	2005 GC_{165}	—	April 10, 2005	Mount Lemmon	Mount Lemmon Survey	·	3.1 km	MPC · JPL
289689	2005 GW_{166}	—	April 11, 2005	Mount Lemmon	Mount Lemmon Survey	·	2.0 km	MPC · JPL
289690	2005 GE_{167}	—	April 11, 2005	Mount Lemmon	Mount Lemmon Survey	NYS	1.1 km	MPC · JPL
289691	2005 GH_{167}	—	April 11, 2005	Mount Lemmon	Mount Lemmon Survey	·	1.2 km	MPC · JPL
289692	2005 GT_{167}	—	April 11, 2005	Mount Lemmon	Mount Lemmon Survey	NYS	1.2 km	MPC · JPL
289693	2005 GY_{170}	—	April 12, 2005	Mount Lemmon	Mount Lemmon Survey	AGN	1.4 km	MPC · JPL
289694	2005 GG_{175}	—	April 14, 2005	Kitt Peak	Spacewatch	EOS	2.1 km	MPC · JPL
289695	2005 GF_{176}	—	April 14, 2005	Kitt Peak	Spacewatch	·	2.9 km	MPC · JPL
289696	2005 GS_{177}	—	April 15, 2005	Kitt Peak	Spacewatch	·	1.9 km	MPC · JPL
289697	2005 GG_{180}	—	April 9, 2005	Catalina	CSS	·	3.7 km	MPC · JPL
289698	2005 GL_{181}	—	April 12, 2005	Kitt Peak	Spacewatch	·	2.1 km	MPC · JPL
289699	2005 GP_{203}	—	April 9, 2005	Mount Lemmon	Mount Lemmon Survey	·	1.9 km	MPC · JPL
289700	2005 GF_{204}	—	April 10, 2005	Mount Lemmon	Mount Lemmon Survey	·	710 m	MPC · JPL

== 289701–289800 ==
back to top

Designation			Discovery			Properties		Ref
Permanent	Provisional	Named after	Date	Site	Discoverer(s)	Category	Diam.	Ref
289701	2005 GP_{205}	—	April 11, 2005	Kitt Peak	M. W. Buie	·	1.6 km	MPC · JPL
289702	2005 GR_{206}	—	April 12, 2005	Kitt Peak	M. W. Buie	·	2.8 km	MPC · JPL
289703	2005 GU_{223}	—	April 14, 2005	Kitt Peak	Spacewatch	NYS	1.5 km	MPC · JPL
289704	2005 GB_{224}	—	April 14, 2005	Catalina	CSS	·	1.4 km	MPC · JPL
289705	2005 GZ_{225}	—	April 2, 2005	Mount Lemmon	Mount Lemmon Survey	MAS	750 m	MPC · JPL
289706	2005 GF_{227}	—	April 11, 2005	Siding Spring	SSS	·	1.7 km	MPC · JPL
289707	2005 GY_{227}	—	April 15, 2005	Catalina	CSS	EOS	2.6 km	MPC · JPL
289708	2005 HN	—	April 16, 2005	Kitt Peak	Spacewatch	(5)	1.4 km	MPC · JPL
289709	2005 HP_{2}	—	April 17, 2005	Kitt Peak	Spacewatch	·	1.7 km	MPC · JPL
289710	2005 HX_{6}	—	April 30, 2005	Kitt Peak	Spacewatch	V	730 m	MPC · JPL
289711	2005 HV_{7}	—	April 30, 2005	Palomar	NEAT	·	1.3 km	MPC · JPL
289712	2005 HP_{10}	—	April 30, 2005	Kitt Peak	Spacewatch	·	3.1 km	MPC · JPL
289713	2005 JE	—	May 2, 2005	Reedy Creek	J. Broughton	·	1.7 km	MPC · JPL
289714	2005 JJ_{2}	—	May 3, 2005	Kitt Peak	Spacewatch	MAS	830 m	MPC · JPL
289715	2005 JZ_{2}	—	May 3, 2005	Kitt Peak	Spacewatch	MAS	840 m	MPC · JPL
289716	2005 JZ_{3}	—	May 3, 2005	Kitt Peak	Spacewatch	·	1.2 km	MPC · JPL
289717	2005 JP_{4}	—	May 1, 2005	Kitt Peak	Spacewatch	·	3.0 km	MPC · JPL
289718	2005 JB_{5}	—	May 4, 2005	Catalina	CSS	T_{j} (2.94)	6.3 km	MPC · JPL
289719	2005 JK_{8}	—	May 4, 2005	Mauna Kea	Veillet, C.	·	1.0 km	MPC · JPL
289720	2005 JE_{11}	—	May 4, 2005	Mauna Kea	Veillet, C.	·	1.2 km	MPC · JPL
289721	2005 JE_{13}	—	May 4, 2005	Mauna Kea	Veillet, C.	·	1.1 km	MPC · JPL
289722	2005 JE_{16}	—	May 3, 2005	Socorro	LINEAR	EOS	3.0 km	MPC · JPL
289723	2005 JE_{17}	—	May 4, 2005	Anderson Mesa	LONEOS	·	1.6 km	MPC · JPL
289724	2005 JG_{17}	—	May 4, 2005	Anderson Mesa	LONEOS	MAR	1.5 km	MPC · JPL
289725	2005 JR_{17}	—	May 4, 2005	Kitt Peak	Spacewatch	·	1.6 km	MPC · JPL
289726	2005 JV_{17}	—	May 4, 2005	Mount Lemmon	Mount Lemmon Survey	·	1.7 km	MPC · JPL
289727	2005 JE_{21}	—	May 4, 2005	Catalina	CSS	·	2.2 km	MPC · JPL
289728	2005 JY_{21}	—	May 5, 2005	Mayhill	Lowe, A.	·	2.6 km	MPC · JPL
289729	2005 JV_{23}	—	May 3, 2005	Kitt Peak	Spacewatch	·	1.4 km	MPC · JPL
289730	2005 JV_{24}	—	May 3, 2005	Kitt Peak	Spacewatch	MAS	940 m	MPC · JPL
289731	2005 JC_{27}	—	May 3, 2005	Kitt Peak	Spacewatch	·	1.3 km	MPC · JPL
289732	2005 JM_{28}	—	May 3, 2005	Kitt Peak	Spacewatch	·	2.1 km	MPC · JPL
289733	2005 JX_{28}	—	May 3, 2005	Kitt Peak	Spacewatch	·	1.7 km	MPC · JPL
289734	2005 JB_{29}	—	May 3, 2005	Kitt Peak	Spacewatch	L4	10 km	MPC · JPL
289735	2005 JH_{29}	—	May 3, 2005	Kitt Peak	Spacewatch	·	3.8 km	MPC · JPL
289736	2005 JL_{30}	—	May 4, 2005	Kitt Peak	Spacewatch	·	640 m	MPC · JPL
289737	2005 JE_{33}	—	May 4, 2005	Mount Lemmon	Mount Lemmon Survey	KOR	1.6 km	MPC · JPL
289738	2005 JU_{35}	—	May 4, 2005	Kitt Peak	Spacewatch	(5)	1.5 km	MPC · JPL
289739	2005 JX_{35}	—	May 4, 2005	Kitt Peak	Spacewatch	·	1.1 km	MPC · JPL
289740	2005 JA_{37}	—	May 4, 2005	Kitt Peak	Spacewatch	·	2.6 km	MPC · JPL
289741	2005 JF_{37}	—	May 4, 2005	Siding Spring	SSS	H	820 m	MPC · JPL
289742	2005 JN_{42}	—	May 8, 2005	Anderson Mesa	LONEOS	·	3.6 km	MPC · JPL
289743	2005 JN_{47}	—	May 3, 2005	Kitt Peak	Spacewatch	·	3.1 km	MPC · JPL
289744	2005 JO_{49}	—	May 4, 2005	Kitt Peak	Spacewatch	·	2.7 km	MPC · JPL
289745	2005 JT_{52}	—	May 4, 2005	Kitt Peak	Spacewatch	EOS	2.4 km	MPC · JPL
289746	2005 JT_{53}	—	May 4, 2005	Kitt Peak	Spacewatch	·	2.4 km	MPC · JPL
289747	2005 JN_{56}	—	May 6, 2005	Kitt Peak	Spacewatch	·	2.4 km	MPC · JPL
289748	2005 JB_{58}	—	May 7, 2005	Kitt Peak	Spacewatch	MAS	730 m	MPC · JPL
289749	2005 JQ_{58}	—	May 8, 2005	Kitt Peak	Spacewatch	·	2.4 km	MPC · JPL
289750	2005 JH_{60}	—	May 8, 2005	Kitt Peak	Spacewatch	·	3.1 km	MPC · JPL
289751	2005 JB_{61}	—	May 8, 2005	Kitt Peak	Spacewatch	·	1.7 km	MPC · JPL
289752	2005 JX_{62}	—	May 9, 2005	Mount Lemmon	Mount Lemmon Survey	·	1.4 km	MPC · JPL
289753	2005 JL_{63}	—	May 2, 2005	Catalina	CSS	H	830 m	MPC · JPL
289754	2005 JG_{65}	—	May 4, 2005	Palomar	NEAT	ADE	3.8 km	MPC · JPL
289755	2005 JP_{66}	—	May 4, 2005	Palomar	NEAT	·	2.4 km	MPC · JPL
289756	2005 JF_{69}	—	May 6, 2005	Kitt Peak	Spacewatch	·	5.5 km	MPC · JPL
289757	2005 JB_{73}	—	May 8, 2005	Kitt Peak	Spacewatch	·	1.7 km	MPC · JPL
289758	2005 JW_{73}	—	May 8, 2005	Kitt Peak	Spacewatch	EOS	2.5 km	MPC · JPL
289759	2005 JG_{75}	—	May 8, 2005	Siding Spring	SSS	·	1.3 km	MPC · JPL
289760	2005 JH_{75}	—	May 8, 2005	Siding Spring	SSS	·	5.0 km	MPC · JPL
289761	2005 JK_{75}	—	May 9, 2005	Mount Lemmon	Mount Lemmon Survey	·	1.7 km	MPC · JPL
289762	2005 JN_{75}	—	May 9, 2005	Socorro	LINEAR	·	2.5 km	MPC · JPL
289763	2005 JC_{76}	—	May 9, 2005	Mount Lemmon	Mount Lemmon Survey	·	680 m	MPC · JPL
289764	2005 JT_{77}	—	May 10, 2005	Kitt Peak	Spacewatch	·	1.2 km	MPC · JPL
289765	2005 JX_{81}	—	May 4, 2005	Catalina	CSS	·	1.4 km	MPC · JPL
289766	2005 JA_{82}	—	May 9, 2005	Kitt Peak	Spacewatch	·	4.1 km	MPC · JPL
289767	2005 JY_{82}	—	May 8, 2005	Mount Lemmon	Mount Lemmon Survey	·	1.4 km	MPC · JPL
289768	2005 JQ_{83}	—	May 8, 2005	Kitt Peak	Spacewatch	·	1.5 km	MPC · JPL
289769	2005 JS_{87}	—	May 9, 2005	Catalina	CSS	·	1.6 km	MPC · JPL
289770	2005 JB_{90}	—	May 11, 2005	Mount Lemmon	Mount Lemmon Survey	·	860 m	MPC · JPL
289771	2005 JR_{91}	—	May 10, 2005	Mount Lemmon	Mount Lemmon Survey	V	850 m	MPC · JPL
289772	2005 JJ_{92}	—	May 11, 2005	Palomar	NEAT	·	1.5 km	MPC · JPL
289773	2005 JY_{92}	—	May 11, 2005	Palomar	NEAT	BRG	2.2 km	MPC · JPL
289774	2005 JP_{93}	—	May 11, 2005	Palomar	NEAT	·	2.2 km	MPC · JPL
289775	2005 JT_{95}	—	May 8, 2005	Kitt Peak	Spacewatch	·	1.6 km	MPC · JPL
289776	2005 JK_{96}	—	May 8, 2005	Anderson Mesa	LONEOS	·	1.7 km	MPC · JPL
289777	2005 JG_{97}	—	May 8, 2005	Kitt Peak	Spacewatch	HOF	3.7 km	MPC · JPL
289778	2005 JR_{97}	—	May 8, 2005	Kitt Peak	Spacewatch	·	1.7 km	MPC · JPL
289779	2005 JF_{100}	—	May 9, 2005	Kitt Peak	Spacewatch	·	2.1 km	MPC · JPL
289780	2005 JL_{100}	—	May 9, 2005	Kitt Peak	Spacewatch	·	1.5 km	MPC · JPL
289781	2005 JP_{100}	—	May 9, 2005	Anderson Mesa	LONEOS	·	3.2 km	MPC · JPL
289782	2005 JZ_{101}	—	May 9, 2005	Kitt Peak	Spacewatch	DOR	2.0 km	MPC · JPL
289783	2005 JA_{102}	—	May 9, 2005	Kitt Peak	Spacewatch	EOS	4.3 km	MPC · JPL
289784	2005 JO_{102}	—	May 9, 2005	Kitt Peak	Spacewatch	EOS	2.5 km	MPC · JPL
289785	2005 JC_{105}	—	May 11, 2005	Mount Lemmon	Mount Lemmon Survey	·	2.1 km	MPC · JPL
289786	2005 JX_{105}	—	May 11, 2005	Mount Lemmon	Mount Lemmon Survey	(5)	1.4 km	MPC · JPL
289787	2005 JY_{105}	—	May 11, 2005	Mount Lemmon	Mount Lemmon Survey	·	1.1 km	MPC · JPL
289788	2005 JN_{108}	—	May 12, 2005	Bergisch Gladbach	Bergisch Gladbach	TEL	1.5 km	MPC · JPL
289789	2005 JE_{111}	—	May 8, 2005	Kitt Peak	Spacewatch	·	650 m	MPC · JPL
289790	2005 JS_{112}	—	May 9, 2005	Kitt Peak	Spacewatch	L4	10 km	MPC · JPL
289791	2005 JC_{114}	—	May 10, 2005	Kitt Peak	Spacewatch	EOS	4.1 km	MPC · JPL
289792	2005 JS_{117}	—	May 10, 2005	Kitt Peak	Spacewatch	BRA	1.7 km	MPC · JPL
289793	2005 JM_{118}	—	May 10, 2005	Mount Lemmon	Mount Lemmon Survey	·	2.9 km	MPC · JPL
289794	2005 JR_{119}	—	May 10, 2005	Kitt Peak	Spacewatch	·	3.1 km	MPC · JPL
289795	2005 JF_{122}	—	May 10, 2005	Kitt Peak	Spacewatch	·	3.2 km	MPC · JPL
289796	2005 JE_{128}	—	May 12, 2005	Kitt Peak	Spacewatch	·	3.3 km	MPC · JPL
289797	2005 JM_{129}	—	May 13, 2005	Kitt Peak	Spacewatch	EOS	2.3 km	MPC · JPL
289798	2005 JK_{130}	—	May 13, 2005	Socorro	LINEAR	·	1.2 km	MPC · JPL
289799	2005 JK_{131}	—	May 13, 2005	Kitt Peak	Spacewatch	·	940 m	MPC · JPL
289800	2005 JC_{132}	—	May 13, 2005	Kitt Peak	Spacewatch	·	2.8 km	MPC · JPL

== 289801–289900 ==
back to top

Designation			Discovery			Properties		Ref
Permanent	Provisional	Named after	Date	Site	Discoverer(s)	Category	Diam.	Ref
289801	2005 JT_{133}	—	May 14, 2005	Kitt Peak	Spacewatch	·	1.7 km	MPC · JPL
289802	2005 JJ_{136}	—	May 11, 2005	Catalina	CSS	·	3.8 km	MPC · JPL
289803	2005 JP_{142}	—	May 15, 2005	Palomar	NEAT	·	2.1 km	MPC · JPL
289804	2005 JN_{146}	—	May 13, 2005	Catalina	CSS	·	2.6 km	MPC · JPL
289805	2005 JC_{149}	—	May 3, 2005	Kitt Peak	Spacewatch	·	1.3 km	MPC · JPL
289806	2005 JZ_{149}	—	May 3, 2005	Kitt Peak	Spacewatch	·	3.4 km	MPC · JPL
289807	2005 JH_{153}	—	May 4, 2005	Mount Lemmon	Mount Lemmon Survey	·	1.7 km	MPC · JPL
289808	2005 JD_{157}	—	May 4, 2005	Kitt Peak	Spacewatch	·	2.7 km	MPC · JPL
289809	2005 JT_{159}	—	May 7, 2005	Mount Lemmon	Mount Lemmon Survey	·	3.1 km	MPC · JPL
289810	2005 JQ_{164}	—	May 10, 2005	Kitt Peak	Spacewatch	·	1.2 km	MPC · JPL
289811	2005 JG_{168}	—	May 6, 2005	Catalina	CSS	MAR	1.4 km	MPC · JPL
289812	2005 JM_{171}	—	May 10, 2005	Cerro Tololo	M. W. Buie	·	2.2 km	MPC · JPL
289813	2005 JQ_{171}	—	May 10, 2005	Cerro Tololo	M. W. Buie	·	1.2 km	MPC · JPL
289814	2005 JP_{177}	—	May 7, 2005	Catalina	CSS	EUP	5.0 km	MPC · JPL
289815	2005 JL_{182}	—	May 4, 2005	Mount Lemmon	Mount Lemmon Survey	·	820 m	MPC · JPL
289816	2005 JA_{184}	—	May 14, 2005	Palomar	NEAT	MRX	1.4 km	MPC · JPL
289817	2005 KL	—	May 16, 2005	Socorro	LINEAR	·	1.2 km	MPC · JPL
289818	2005 KY_{2}	—	May 16, 2005	Palomar	NEAT	·	1.3 km	MPC · JPL
289819	2005 KA_{3}	—	May 17, 2005	Mount Lemmon	Mount Lemmon Survey	·	1.5 km	MPC · JPL
289820	2005 KD_{3}	—	May 17, 2005	Mount Lemmon	Mount Lemmon Survey	·	2.1 km	MPC · JPL
289821	2005 KR_{3}	—	May 17, 2005	Mount Lemmon	Mount Lemmon Survey	·	1.9 km	MPC · JPL
289822	2005 KE_{7}	—	May 16, 2005	Palomar	NEAT	·	2.7 km	MPC · JPL
289823	2005 KX_{7}	—	May 20, 2005	Mount Lemmon	Mount Lemmon Survey	NYS	1.5 km	MPC · JPL
289824	2005 KG_{10}	—	May 30, 2005	La Silla	Bourban, G., Behrend, R.	·	1.5 km	MPC · JPL
289825	2005 KW_{12}	—	May 16, 2005	Kitt Peak	Spacewatch	·	2.5 km	MPC · JPL
289826	2005 KX_{13}	—	May 21, 2005	Mount Lemmon	Mount Lemmon Survey	·	3.3 km	MPC · JPL
289827	2005 LP_{3}	—	June 1, 2005	Catalina	CSS	·	2.2 km	MPC · JPL
289828	2005 LT_{4}	—	June 1, 2005	Kitt Peak	Spacewatch	·	4.0 km	MPC · JPL
289829	2005 LC_{9}	—	June 1, 2005	Kitt Peak	Spacewatch	·	1.4 km	MPC · JPL
289830	2005 LC_{11}	—	June 3, 2005	Kitt Peak	Spacewatch	·	2.8 km	MPC · JPL
289831	2005 LS_{12}	—	June 5, 2005	Socorro	LINEAR	·	4.8 km	MPC · JPL
289832	2005 LM_{14}	—	June 5, 2005	Kitt Peak	Spacewatch	·	4.9 km	MPC · JPL
289833	2005 LC_{18}	—	June 6, 2005	Kitt Peak	Spacewatch	V	880 m	MPC · JPL
289834	2005 LW_{20}	—	June 5, 2005	Kitt Peak	Spacewatch	·	1.3 km	MPC · JPL
289835	2005 LC_{22}	—	June 10, 2005	Kitt Peak	Spacewatch	·	2.9 km	MPC · JPL
289836	2005 LK_{23}	—	June 8, 2005	Kitt Peak	Spacewatch	EOS	2.1 km	MPC · JPL
289837	2005 LJ_{25}	—	June 8, 2005	Kitt Peak	Spacewatch	·	1.2 km	MPC · JPL
289838	2005 LK_{26}	—	June 8, 2005	Kitt Peak	Spacewatch	L4	9.7 km	MPC · JPL
289839	2005 LY_{29}	—	June 11, 2005	Kitt Peak	Spacewatch	·	2.2 km	MPC · JPL
289840	2005 LP_{33}	—	June 10, 2005	Kitt Peak	Spacewatch	NYS	1.0 km	MPC · JPL
289841	2005 LL_{34}	—	June 10, 2005	Kitt Peak	Spacewatch	EOS	2.2 km	MPC · JPL
289842	2005 LS_{34}	—	June 10, 2005	Kitt Peak	Spacewatch	·	1.1 km	MPC · JPL
289843	2005 LS_{35}	—	June 11, 2005	Kitt Peak	Spacewatch	·	3.8 km	MPC · JPL
289844	2005 LV_{40}	—	June 10, 2005	Kitt Peak	Spacewatch	·	1.2 km	MPC · JPL
289845	2005 LE_{41}	—	June 11, 2005	Catalina	CSS	·	1.7 km	MPC · JPL
289846	2005 LR_{43}	—	June 10, 2005	Kitt Peak	Spacewatch	·	6.2 km	MPC · JPL
289847	2005 LF_{48}	—	June 10, 2005	Reedy Creek	J. Broughton	·	4.2 km	MPC · JPL
289848	2005 LX_{48}	—	June 10, 2005	Kitt Peak	Spacewatch	·	1.7 km	MPC · JPL
289849	2005 LW_{51}	—	June 15, 2005	Kitt Peak	Spacewatch	·	1.8 km	MPC · JPL
289850	2005 LU_{53}	—	June 15, 2005	Mount Lemmon	Mount Lemmon Survey	·	1.6 km	MPC · JPL
289851	2005 MA_{3}	—	June 20, 2005	Palomar	NEAT	·	3.3 km	MPC · JPL
289852	2005 MK_{5}	—	June 24, 2005	Palomar	NEAT	·	830 m	MPC · JPL
289853	2005 MZ_{5}	—	June 21, 2005	Palomar	NEAT	·	6.0 km	MPC · JPL
289854	2005 MW_{6}	—	June 27, 2005	Kitt Peak	Spacewatch	·	2.3 km	MPC · JPL
289855	2005 MT_{8}	—	June 28, 2005	Palomar	NEAT	·	1.7 km	MPC · JPL
289856	2005 MC_{9}	—	June 28, 2005	Kitt Peak	Spacewatch	(13314)	2.5 km	MPC · JPL
289857	2005 MK_{9}	—	June 28, 2005	Kitt Peak	Spacewatch	·	2.2 km	MPC · JPL
289858	2005 MR_{9}	—	June 28, 2005	Palomar	NEAT	·	4.0 km	MPC · JPL
289859	2005 MZ_{9}	—	June 23, 2005	Palomar	NEAT	·	3.7 km	MPC · JPL
289860	2005 MK_{11}	—	June 27, 2005	Kitt Peak	Spacewatch	·	1.9 km	MPC · JPL
289861	2005 MQ_{11}	—	June 27, 2005	Kitt Peak	Spacewatch	L4	15 km	MPC · JPL
289862	2005 MB_{12}	—	June 28, 2005	Palomar	NEAT	V	830 m	MPC · JPL
289863	2005 MK_{12}	—	June 28, 2005	Palomar	NEAT	·	4.0 km	MPC · JPL
289864	2005 MG_{14}	—	June 28, 2005	Kitt Peak	Spacewatch	·	2.0 km	MPC · JPL
289865	2005 MP_{15}	—	June 24, 2005	Palomar	NEAT	HNS	1.4 km	MPC · JPL
289866	2005 MV_{15}	—	June 30, 2005	Junk Bond	D. Healy	·	850 m	MPC · JPL
289867	2005 MB_{16}	—	June 28, 2005	Mount Lemmon	Mount Lemmon Survey	·	1.2 km	MPC · JPL
289868	2005 MF_{16}	—	June 24, 2005	Palomar	NEAT	·	5.1 km	MPC · JPL
289869	2005 MZ_{16}	—	June 27, 2005	Kitt Peak	Spacewatch	·	800 m	MPC · JPL
289870	2005 MM_{17}	—	June 27, 2005	Kitt Peak	Spacewatch	NYS	1.3 km	MPC · JPL
289871	2005 MP_{17}	—	June 27, 2005	Kitt Peak	Spacewatch	(1298)	3.6 km	MPC · JPL
289872	2005 MB_{21}	—	June 30, 2005	Kitt Peak	Spacewatch	·	2.6 km	MPC · JPL
289873	2005 ME_{21}	—	June 30, 2005	Palomar	NEAT	·	1.4 km	MPC · JPL
289874	2005 MQ_{21}	—	June 30, 2005	Kitt Peak	Spacewatch	EOS	2.7 km	MPC · JPL
289875	2005 MU_{21}	—	June 30, 2005	Kitt Peak	Spacewatch	THM	2.5 km	MPC · JPL
289876	2005 MJ_{23}	—	June 24, 2005	Palomar	NEAT	·	4.9 km	MPC · JPL
289877	2005 MX_{23}	—	June 26, 2005	Mount Lemmon	Mount Lemmon Survey	·	800 m	MPC · JPL
289878	2005 MP_{24}	—	June 28, 2005	Palomar	NEAT	·	1.1 km	MPC · JPL
289879	2005 MV_{24}	—	June 27, 2005	Kitt Peak	Spacewatch	·	2.5 km	MPC · JPL
289880	2005 MZ_{24}	—	June 27, 2005	Kitt Peak	Spacewatch	·	2.5 km	MPC · JPL
289881	2005 MK_{25}	—	June 27, 2005	Kitt Peak	Spacewatch	·	1.8 km	MPC · JPL
289882	2005 MQ_{26}	—	June 28, 2005	Kitt Peak	Spacewatch	·	2.1 km	MPC · JPL
289883	2005 MS_{27}	—	June 29, 2005	Kitt Peak	Spacewatch	V	740 m	MPC · JPL
289884	2005 MW_{27}	—	June 29, 2005	Kitt Peak	Spacewatch	·	3.9 km	MPC · JPL
289885	2005 MN_{28}	—	June 29, 2005	Kitt Peak	Spacewatch	V	720 m	MPC · JPL
289886	2005 MZ_{28}	—	June 29, 2005	Kitt Peak	Spacewatch	·	3.0 km	MPC · JPL
289887	2005 MK_{31}	—	June 30, 2005	Kitt Peak	Spacewatch	·	730 m	MPC · JPL
289888	2005 MU_{31}	—	June 28, 2005	Palomar	NEAT	·	2.1 km	MPC · JPL
289889	2005 MX_{31}	—	June 28, 2005	Palomar	NEAT	EOS	3.7 km	MPC · JPL
289890	2005 MK_{32}	—	June 28, 2005	Palomar	NEAT	·	4.5 km	MPC · JPL
289891	2005 MY_{32}	—	June 29, 2005	Kitt Peak	Spacewatch	·	1.9 km	MPC · JPL
289892	2005 MM_{34}	—	June 29, 2005	Palomar	NEAT	·	930 m	MPC · JPL
289893	2005 MR_{35}	—	June 30, 2005	Kitt Peak	Spacewatch	·	1.2 km	MPC · JPL
289894	2005 MH_{36}	—	June 30, 2005	Kitt Peak	Spacewatch	·	1.6 km	MPC · JPL
289895	2005 MT_{36}	—	June 30, 2005	Kitt Peak	Spacewatch	NYS	1.3 km	MPC · JPL
289896	2005 MK_{42}	—	June 29, 2005	Kitt Peak	Spacewatch	·	3.2 km	MPC · JPL
289897	2005 MY_{44}	—	June 27, 2005	Kitt Peak	Spacewatch	EUN	1.6 km	MPC · JPL
289898	2005 MU_{46}	—	June 28, 2005	Kitt Peak	Spacewatch	·	1.2 km	MPC · JPL
289899	2005 MX_{46}	—	June 28, 2005	Kitt Peak	Spacewatch	·	5.3 km	MPC · JPL
289900	2005 MP_{47}	—	June 29, 2005	Kitt Peak	Spacewatch	·	1.8 km	MPC · JPL

== 289901–290000 ==
back to top

Designation			Discovery			Properties		Ref
Permanent	Provisional	Named after	Date	Site	Discoverer(s)	Category	Diam.	Ref
289901	2005 MP_{53}	—	June 17, 2005	Mount Lemmon	Mount Lemmon Survey	·	810 m	MPC · JPL
289902	2005 MW_{53}	—	June 18, 2005	Mount Lemmon	Mount Lemmon Survey	NYS	1.1 km	MPC · JPL
289903	2005 MC_{55}	—	June 30, 2005	Anderson Mesa	LONEOS	·	5.6 km	MPC · JPL
289904	2005 NO_{1}	—	July 2, 2005	Kitt Peak	Spacewatch	·	2.8 km	MPC · JPL
289905	2005 NX_{1}	—	July 1, 2005	Kitt Peak	Spacewatch	PHO	1.1 km	MPC · JPL
289906	2005 NP_{5}	—	July 3, 2005	Mount Lemmon	Mount Lemmon Survey	·	1.9 km	MPC · JPL
289907	2005 NG_{6}	—	July 4, 2005	Mount Lemmon	Mount Lemmon Survey	·	1.5 km	MPC · JPL
289908	2005 NT_{7}	—	July 1, 2005	Kitt Peak	Spacewatch	·	3.0 km	MPC · JPL
289909	2005 NT_{8}	—	July 1, 2005	Kitt Peak	Spacewatch	·	2.2 km	MPC · JPL
289910	2005 NX_{11}	—	July 4, 2005	Kitt Peak	Spacewatch	·	1.4 km	MPC · JPL
289911	2005 NH_{12}	—	July 4, 2005	Mount Lemmon	Mount Lemmon Survey	NEM	2.4 km	MPC · JPL
289912	2005 NK_{12}	—	July 4, 2005	Mount Lemmon	Mount Lemmon Survey	·	1.5 km	MPC · JPL
289913	2005 NF_{13}	—	July 4, 2005	Campo Imperatore	CINEOS	·	4.0 km	MPC · JPL
289914	2005 NX_{13}	—	July 5, 2005	Kitt Peak	Spacewatch	GAL	2.1 km	MPC · JPL
289915	2005 NK_{19}	—	July 5, 2005	Mount Lemmon	Mount Lemmon Survey	CYB	6.1 km	MPC · JPL
289916	2005 NB_{20}	—	July 5, 2005	Siding Spring	SSS	·	2.7 km	MPC · JPL
289917	2005 NM_{21}	—	July 1, 2005	Kitt Peak	Spacewatch	·	4.6 km	MPC · JPL
289918	2005 NN_{22}	—	July 1, 2005	Kitt Peak	Spacewatch	·	4.7 km	MPC · JPL
289919	2005 NR_{23}	—	July 4, 2005	Kitt Peak	Spacewatch	URS	3.0 km	MPC · JPL
289920	2005 NU_{23}	—	July 4, 2005	Kitt Peak	Spacewatch	·	3.3 km	MPC · JPL
289921	2005 NT_{24}	—	July 4, 2005	Kitt Peak	Spacewatch	·	1.5 km	MPC · JPL
289922	2005 NP_{26}	—	July 5, 2005	Mount Lemmon	Mount Lemmon Survey	·	4.4 km	MPC · JPL
289923	2005 NQ_{27}	—	July 5, 2005	Palomar	NEAT	·	990 m	MPC · JPL
289924	2005 NS_{27}	—	July 5, 2005	Palomar	NEAT	·	1.6 km	MPC · JPL
289925	2005 NT_{27}	—	July 5, 2005	Palomar	NEAT	·	2.2 km	MPC · JPL
289926	2005 NU_{29}	—	July 3, 2005	Mount Lemmon	Mount Lemmon Survey	·	1.3 km	MPC · JPL
289927	2005 NE_{30}	—	July 4, 2005	Kitt Peak	Spacewatch	NYS	1.5 km	MPC · JPL
289928	2005 NY_{31}	—	July 5, 2005	Kitt Peak	Spacewatch	·	2.3 km	MPC · JPL
289929	2005 ND_{32}	—	July 5, 2005	Kitt Peak	Spacewatch	·	4.1 km	MPC · JPL
289930	2005 NR_{32}	—	July 5, 2005	Kitt Peak	Spacewatch	·	1.9 km	MPC · JPL
289931	2005 NW_{32}	—	July 5, 2005	Palomar	NEAT	·	3.7 km	MPC · JPL
289932	2005 NR_{33}	—	July 5, 2005	Kitt Peak	Spacewatch	AST	1.6 km	MPC · JPL
289933	2005 NS_{33}	—	July 5, 2005	Kitt Peak	Spacewatch	·	2.4 km	MPC · JPL
289934	2005 NZ_{33}	—	July 5, 2005	Kitt Peak	Spacewatch	·	1.3 km	MPC · JPL
289935	2005 NR_{35}	—	July 5, 2005	Kitt Peak	Spacewatch	THM	2.4 km	MPC · JPL
289936	2005 NC_{36}	—	July 5, 2005	Mount Lemmon	Mount Lemmon Survey	·	1.1 km	MPC · JPL
289937	2005 NE_{36}	—	July 5, 2005	Mount Lemmon	Mount Lemmon Survey	·	2.2 km	MPC · JPL
289938	2005 NQ_{37}	—	July 6, 2005	Kitt Peak	Spacewatch	·	3.8 km	MPC · JPL
289939	2005 NM_{40}	—	July 3, 2005	Mount Lemmon	Mount Lemmon Survey	·	1.3 km	MPC · JPL
289940	2005 NM_{41}	—	July 4, 2005	Mount Lemmon	Mount Lemmon Survey	EOS	2.6 km	MPC · JPL
289941	2005 NB_{44}	—	July 6, 2005	Kitt Peak	Spacewatch	·	2.4 km	MPC · JPL
289942	2005 ND_{44}	—	July 6, 2005	Kitt Peak	Spacewatch	·	1.8 km	MPC · JPL
289943	2005 NE_{45}	—	July 4, 2005	Palomar	NEAT	·	930 m	MPC · JPL
289944	2005 NK_{46}	—	July 5, 2005	Palomar	NEAT	·	4.8 km	MPC · JPL
289945	2005 NQ_{46}	—	July 6, 2005	Kitt Peak	Spacewatch	·	1.4 km	MPC · JPL
289946	2005 NT_{49}	—	July 4, 2005	Mount Lemmon	Mount Lemmon Survey	·	3.6 km	MPC · JPL
289947	2005 NU_{49}	—	July 4, 2005	Mount Lemmon	Mount Lemmon Survey	HIL · 3:2	8.7 km	MPC · JPL
289948	2005 NK_{50}	—	July 5, 2005	Kitt Peak	Spacewatch	VER	3.0 km	MPC · JPL
289949	2005 NX_{53}	—	July 10, 2005	Catalina	CSS	PHO	3.7 km	MPC · JPL
289950	2005 NE_{54}	—	July 10, 2005	Kitt Peak	Spacewatch	·	1.2 km	MPC · JPL
289951	2005 NN_{57}	—	July 5, 2005	Mount Lemmon	Mount Lemmon Survey	NYS	1.3 km	MPC · JPL
289952	2005 NO_{58}	—	July 6, 2005	Kitt Peak	Spacewatch	·	1.9 km	MPC · JPL
289953	2005 NG_{63}	—	July 13, 2005	Mayhill	Lowe, A.	·	2.5 km	MPC · JPL
289954	2005 NH_{65}	—	July 1, 2005	Kitt Peak	Spacewatch	·	2.6 km	MPC · JPL
289955	2005 NT_{67}	—	July 3, 2005	Mount Lemmon	Mount Lemmon Survey	·	1.0 km	MPC · JPL
289956	2005 NU_{67}	—	July 3, 2005	Mount Lemmon	Mount Lemmon Survey	(5)	1.9 km	MPC · JPL
289957	2005 NZ_{68}	—	July 3, 2005	Palomar	NEAT	·	1.9 km	MPC · JPL
289958	2005 NC_{70}	—	July 4, 2005	Palomar	NEAT	GEF	1.7 km	MPC · JPL
289959	2005 NP_{75}	—	July 10, 2005	Kitt Peak	Spacewatch	·	1.4 km	MPC · JPL
289960	2005 NU_{75}	—	July 10, 2005	Kitt Peak	Spacewatch	·	4.3 km	MPC · JPL
289961	2005 NX_{78}	—	July 12, 2005	Mount Lemmon	Mount Lemmon Survey	·	1.7 km	MPC · JPL
289962	2005 NA_{79}	—	July 12, 2005	Mount Lemmon	Mount Lemmon Survey	·	1.8 km	MPC · JPL
289963	2005 NJ_{82}	—	July 15, 2005	Mount Lemmon	Mount Lemmon Survey	NYS	1.2 km	MPC · JPL
289964	2005 NA_{84}	—	July 1, 2005	Kitt Peak	Spacewatch	·	2.5 km	MPC · JPL
289965	2005 NR_{84}	—	July 2, 2005	Kitt Peak	Spacewatch	·	1.8 km	MPC · JPL
289966	2005 NH_{90}	—	July 5, 2005	Kitt Peak	Spacewatch	·	3.7 km	MPC · JPL
289967	2005 NL_{92}	—	July 5, 2005	Kitt Peak	Spacewatch	·	2.9 km	MPC · JPL
289968	2005 ND_{94}	—	July 6, 2005	Kitt Peak	Spacewatch	·	4.7 km	MPC · JPL
289969	2005 NX_{95}	—	July 7, 2005	Kitt Peak	Spacewatch	·	1.5 km	MPC · JPL
289970	2005 NL_{100}	—	July 12, 2005	Mount Lemmon	Mount Lemmon Survey	AST	1.8 km	MPC · JPL
289971	2005 NP_{100}	—	July 15, 2005	Mount Lemmon	Mount Lemmon Survey	V	970 m	MPC · JPL
289972	2005 ND_{112}	—	July 7, 2005	Mauna Kea	Veillet, C.	·	1.3 km	MPC · JPL
289973	2005 NZ_{114}	—	July 7, 2005	Mauna Kea	Veillet, C.	·	1.7 km	MPC · JPL
289974	2005 NF_{116}	—	July 7, 2005	Mauna Kea	Veillet, C.	·	990 m	MPC · JPL
289975	2005 NK_{123}	—	July 9, 2005	Kitt Peak	Spacewatch	·	2.0 km	MPC · JPL
289976	2005 NP_{124}	—	July 4, 2005	Palomar	NEAT	·	1.4 km	MPC · JPL
289977	2005 NE_{125}	—	July 12, 2005	Kitt Peak	Spacewatch	·	1.4 km	MPC · JPL
289978	2005 OH	—	July 18, 2005	Siding Spring	SSS	T_{j} (2.98) · EUP	6.5 km	MPC · JPL
289979	2005 OY_{4}	—	July 28, 2005	Palomar	NEAT	V	820 m	MPC · JPL
289980	2005 OK_{7}	—	July 29, 2005	Socorro	LINEAR	H	920 m	MPC · JPL
289981	2005 OR_{8}	—	July 29, 2005	Palomar	NEAT	·	1.3 km	MPC · JPL
289982	2005 OO_{9}	—	July 27, 2005	Palomar	NEAT	·	4.5 km	MPC · JPL
289983	2005 OD_{20}	—	July 28, 2005	Palomar	NEAT	·	2.1 km	MPC · JPL
289984	2005 OF_{23}	—	July 30, 2005	Palomar	NEAT	·	2.4 km	MPC · JPL
289985	2005 OD_{24}	—	July 30, 2005	Palomar	NEAT	·	1.8 km	MPC · JPL
289986	2005 OG_{27}	—	July 30, 2005	Palomar	NEAT	·	4.1 km	MPC · JPL
289987	2005 OJ_{27}	—	July 30, 2005	Palomar	NEAT	·	4.5 km	MPC · JPL
289988	2005 OM_{27}	—	July 31, 2005	Palomar	NEAT	·	1.3 km	MPC · JPL
289989	2005 OQ_{28}	—	July 31, 2005	Palomar	NEAT	EUN	2.0 km	MPC · JPL
289990	2005 OZ_{28}	—	July 30, 2005	Palomar	NEAT	·	5.8 km	MPC · JPL
289991	2005 PS_{1}	—	August 1, 2005	Siding Spring	SSS	·	2.8 km	MPC · JPL
289992 Onfray	2005 PF_{6}	Onfray	August 10, 2005	Saint-Sulpice	Saint-Sulpice	·	2.3 km	MPC · JPL
289993	2005 PX_{6}	—	August 4, 2005	Palomar	NEAT	·	4.4 km	MPC · JPL
289994	2005 PH_{7}	—	August 1, 2005	Siding Spring	SSS	·	970 m	MPC · JPL
289995	2005 PC_{9}	—	August 4, 2005	Palomar	NEAT	·	2.3 km	MPC · JPL
289996	2005 PV_{10}	—	August 4, 2005	Palomar	NEAT	EOS	2.0 km	MPC · JPL
289997	2005 PS_{12}	—	August 4, 2005	Palomar	NEAT	·	950 m	MPC · JPL
289998	2005 PT_{12}	—	August 4, 2005	Palomar	NEAT	·	3.4 km	MPC · JPL
289999	2005 PX_{14}	—	August 4, 2005	Palomar	NEAT	·	1.5 km	MPC · JPL
290000	2005 PG_{15}	—	August 4, 2005	Palomar	NEAT	·	2.1 km	MPC · JPL

back to top

== See also ==
- Meanings of minor-planet names: 289001–290000
