= List of minor planets: 402001–403000 =

The following is a partial list of minor planets, running from minor-planet number 402001 through 403000, inclusive. The primary data for this and other partial lists is based on JPL's "Small-Body Orbital Elements" and data available from the Minor Planet Center. Critical list information is also provided by the MPC, unless otherwise specified from Lowell Observatory. A detailed description of the table's columns and additional sources are given on the main page including a complete list of every page in this series, and a statistical break-up on the dynamical classification of minor planets.

Also see the summary list of all named bodies in numerical and alphabetical order, and the corresponding naming citations for the number range of this particular list. New namings may only be added to this list after official publication, as the preannouncement of names is condemned by the Working Group for Small Bodies Nomenclature of the International Astronomical Union.

Near-Earth obj.	MBA (inner)	MBA (outer)	Centaur
Mars-crosser	MBA (middle)	Jupiter trojan	Trans-Neptunian obj.
Unclassified

== 402001–402100 ==
Designation			Discovery			Properties		Ref
Permanent	Provisional	Named after	Date	Site	Discoverer(s)	Category	Diam.	Ref
402001	2003 PR_{8}	—	July 25, 2003	Socorro	LINEAR	·	3.3 km	MPC · JPL
402002	2003 QL	—	August 18, 2003	Campo Imperatore	CINEOS	LIX	4.1 km	MPC · JPL
402003	2003 QG_{10}	—	August 21, 2003	Campo Imperatore	CINEOS	TIR ·	4.4 km	MPC · JPL
402004	2003 QU_{32}	—	August 21, 2003	Campo Imperatore	CINEOS	·	3.0 km	MPC · JPL
402005	2003 QV_{34}	—	August 22, 2003	Palomar	NEAT	·	4.6 km	MPC · JPL
402006	2003 QY_{34}	—	August 22, 2003	Socorro	LINEAR	·	3.5 km	MPC · JPL
402007	2003 QZ_{51}	—	August 23, 2003	Palomar	NEAT	·	2.4 km	MPC · JPL
402008 Laborfalviróza	2003 QZ_{69}	Laborfalviróza	August 26, 2003	Piszkéstető	K. Sárneczky, B. Sipőcz	·	1.1 km	MPC · JPL
402009	2003 QV_{94}	—	August 29, 2003	Haleakala	NEAT	T_{j} (2.99)	3.8 km	MPC · JPL
402010	2003 QP_{104}	—	August 30, 2003	Kitt Peak	Spacewatch	·	1.8 km	MPC · JPL
402011	2003 RN_{7}	—	September 5, 2003	Socorro	LINEAR	·	1.8 km	MPC · JPL
402012	2003 RF_{15}	—	September 15, 2003	Haleakala	NEAT	·	3.4 km	MPC · JPL
402013	2003 RZ_{24}	—	September 15, 2003	Palomar	NEAT	NYS	1.0 km	MPC · JPL
402014	2003 RA_{27}	—	September 4, 2003	Campo Imperatore	CINEOS	VER	3.8 km	MPC · JPL
402015	2003 SY_{24}	—	September 17, 2003	Kitt Peak	Spacewatch	·	3.9 km	MPC · JPL
402016	2003 SB_{28}	—	September 18, 2003	Palomar	NEAT	·	1.3 km	MPC · JPL
402017	2003 SD_{32}	—	September 16, 2003	Palomar	NEAT	·	1.6 km	MPC · JPL
402018	2003 SK_{34}	—	September 18, 2003	Kitt Peak	Spacewatch	·	3.6 km	MPC · JPL
402019	2003 SE_{39}	—	September 16, 2003	Palomar	NEAT	·	1.3 km	MPC · JPL
402020	2003 SU_{54}	—	September 16, 2003	Anderson Mesa	LONEOS	LIX	4.1 km	MPC · JPL
402021	2003 SY_{59}	—	September 17, 2003	Anderson Mesa	LONEOS	T_{j} (2.97)	3.5 km	MPC · JPL
402022	2003 SK_{83}	—	September 18, 2003	Kitt Peak	Spacewatch	MAS	610 m	MPC · JPL
402023	2003 SP_{87}	—	September 17, 2003	Socorro	LINEAR	·	1.4 km	MPC · JPL
402024	2003 SB_{88}	—	September 17, 2003	Črni Vrh	Skvarč, J.	·	4.4 km	MPC · JPL
402025	2003 SA_{101}	—	September 20, 2003	Socorro	LINEAR	H	680 m	MPC · JPL
402026	2003 SC_{113}	—	September 16, 2003	Kitt Peak	Spacewatch	·	4.2 km	MPC · JPL
402027	2003 SG_{155}	—	September 19, 2003	Anderson Mesa	LONEOS	NYS	1.3 km	MPC · JPL
402028	2003 SV_{157}	—	September 20, 2003	Socorro	LINEAR	·	3.4 km	MPC · JPL
402029	2003 SY_{164}	—	September 20, 2003	Anderson Mesa	LONEOS	·	1.3 km	MPC · JPL
402030	2003 SH_{173}	—	September 18, 2003	Socorro	LINEAR	NYS	1.3 km	MPC · JPL
402031	2003 SQ_{175}	—	September 18, 2003	Kitt Peak	Spacewatch	THM	3.0 km	MPC · JPL
402032	2003 SD_{185}	—	September 21, 2003	Palomar	NEAT	·	3.2 km	MPC · JPL
402033	2003 SE_{187}	—	September 22, 2003	Anderson Mesa	LONEOS	·	1.1 km	MPC · JPL
402034	2003 SP_{206}	—	September 25, 2003	Haleakala	NEAT	·	1.3 km	MPC · JPL
402035	2003 SO_{209}	—	September 24, 2003	Kvistaberg	Uppsala-DLR Asteroid Survey	·	4.1 km	MPC · JPL
402036	2003 SB_{223}	—	September 27, 2003	Socorro	LINEAR	THB	3.3 km	MPC · JPL
402037	2003 SE_{224}	—	September 25, 2003	Bergisch Gladbach	W. Bickel	·	4.0 km	MPC · JPL
402038	2003 SQ_{229}	—	September 27, 2003	Kitt Peak	Spacewatch	·	3.4 km	MPC · JPL
402039	2003 SS_{229}	—	September 27, 2003	Kitt Peak	Spacewatch	·	1.3 km	MPC · JPL
402040	2003 SY_{245}	—	September 26, 2003	Socorro	LINEAR	NYS	1.1 km	MPC · JPL
402041	2003 SV_{270}	—	September 25, 2003	Palomar	NEAT	NYS	1.0 km	MPC · JPL
402042	2003 SK_{272}	—	September 27, 2003	Socorro	LINEAR	·	1.2 km	MPC · JPL
402043	2003 ST_{274}	—	September 28, 2003	Kitt Peak	Spacewatch	MAS	650 m	MPC · JPL
402044	2003 SY_{277}	—	September 30, 2003	Socorro	LINEAR	·	3.6 km	MPC · JPL
402045	2003 SP_{279}	—	September 17, 2003	Kitt Peak	Spacewatch	·	1.1 km	MPC · JPL
402046	2003 SD_{281}	—	September 18, 2003	Kitt Peak	Spacewatch	NYS	1.2 km	MPC · JPL
402047	2003 SR_{288}	—	September 28, 2003	Socorro	LINEAR	·	2.3 km	MPC · JPL
402048	2003 SZ_{292}	—	September 27, 2003	Socorro	LINEAR	·	3.3 km	MPC · JPL
402049	2003 SD_{301}	—	September 17, 2003	Palomar	NEAT	·	1.5 km	MPC · JPL
402050	2003 SZ_{311}	—	September 2, 2003	Socorro	LINEAR	·	2.8 km	MPC · JPL
402051	2003 SW_{314}	—	September 20, 2003	Kitt Peak	Spacewatch	·	2.4 km	MPC · JPL
402052	2003 SU_{323}	—	September 16, 2003	Kitt Peak	Spacewatch	·	2.3 km	MPC · JPL
402053	2003 SY_{328}	—	September 21, 2003	Kitt Peak	Spacewatch	·	810 m	MPC · JPL
402054	2003 SF_{330}	—	September 26, 2003	Apache Point	SDSS	THM	2.2 km	MPC · JPL
402055	2003 SN_{333}	—	September 26, 2003	Apache Point	SDSS	·	3.7 km	MPC · JPL
402056	2003 SM_{338}	—	September 26, 2003	Apache Point	SDSS	·	1.1 km	MPC · JPL
402057	2003 SX_{348}	—	September 18, 2003	Kitt Peak	Spacewatch	MAS	690 m	MPC · JPL
402058	2003 ST_{372}	—	September 26, 2003	Apache Point	SDSS	·	1.0 km	MPC · JPL
402059	2003 SJ_{395}	—	September 26, 2003	Apache Point	SDSS	·	1.3 km	MPC · JPL
402060	2003 SF_{403}	—	September 16, 2003	Kitt Peak	Spacewatch	·	920 m	MPC · JPL
402061	2003 SX_{427}	—	September 16, 2003	Kitt Peak	Spacewatch	·	3.0 km	MPC · JPL
402062	2003 SE_{428}	—	September 16, 2003	Kitt Peak	Spacewatch	·	3.3 km	MPC · JPL
402063	2003 SU_{430}	—	September 30, 2003	Kitt Peak	Spacewatch	·	1.1 km	MPC · JPL
402064	2003 TW_{6}	—	September 17, 2003	Socorro	LINEAR	·	1.3 km	MPC · JPL
402065	2003 TE_{10}	—	October 15, 2003	Socorro	LINEAR	·	4.6 km	MPC · JPL
402066	2003 TY_{12}	—	October 1, 2003	Kitt Peak	Spacewatch	·	4.6 km	MPC · JPL
402067	2003 TF_{26}	—	October 1, 2003	Kitt Peak	Spacewatch	·	1.0 km	MPC · JPL
402068	2003 TB_{38}	—	October 2, 2003	Kitt Peak	Spacewatch	·	1.4 km	MPC · JPL
402069	2003 TV_{44}	—	October 3, 2003	Kitt Peak	Spacewatch	·	2.7 km	MPC · JPL
402070	2003 UB_{25}	—	October 20, 2003	Kingsnake	J. V. McClusky	·	1.2 km	MPC · JPL
402071	2003 UD_{29}	—	October 19, 2003	Kitt Peak	Spacewatch	MAS	800 m	MPC · JPL
402072	2003 UW_{32}	—	October 16, 2003	Kitt Peak	Spacewatch	NYS	1.1 km	MPC · JPL
402073	2003 UE_{107}	—	October 19, 2003	Anderson Mesa	LONEOS	EUP	5.2 km	MPC · JPL
402074	2003 UE_{113}	—	October 20, 2003	Socorro	LINEAR	·	2.0 km	MPC · JPL
402075	2003 UG_{128}	—	October 21, 2003	Kitt Peak	Spacewatch	·	2.9 km	MPC · JPL
402076	2003 UF_{193}	—	October 20, 2003	Kitt Peak	Spacewatch	NYS	970 m	MPC · JPL
402077	2003 US_{199}	—	October 21, 2003	Socorro	LINEAR	MAS	850 m	MPC · JPL
402078	2003 UM_{202}	—	October 21, 2003	Socorro	LINEAR	·	1.2 km	MPC · JPL
402079	2003 UX_{208}	—	September 22, 2003	Kitt Peak	Spacewatch	NYS	890 m	MPC · JPL
402080	2003 UP_{209}	—	October 23, 2003	Kitt Peak	Spacewatch	MAS	850 m	MPC · JPL
402081	2003 UB_{214}	—	October 24, 2003	Socorro	LINEAR	·	2.8 km	MPC · JPL
402082	2003 UK_{214}	—	October 24, 2003	Socorro	LINEAR	·	940 m	MPC · JPL
402083	2003 UH_{215}	—	October 21, 2003	Kitt Peak	Spacewatch	NYS	1.1 km	MPC · JPL
402084	2003 UC_{225}	—	October 22, 2003	Kitt Peak	Spacewatch	·	1 km	MPC · JPL
402085	2003 UN_{226}	—	October 22, 2003	Kitt Peak	Spacewatch	·	1.3 km	MPC · JPL
402086	2003 UO_{233}	—	October 24, 2003	Kitt Peak	Spacewatch	·	1.3 km	MPC · JPL
402087	2003 UN_{241}	—	October 24, 2003	Socorro	LINEAR	·	1.2 km	MPC · JPL
402088	2003 UN_{255}	—	October 25, 2003	Socorro	LINEAR	·	1.3 km	MPC · JPL
402089	2003 UP_{255}	—	October 25, 2003	Socorro	LINEAR	·	1.3 km	MPC · JPL
402090	2003 UU_{255}	—	October 21, 2003	Palomar	NEAT	NYS	1.2 km	MPC · JPL
402091	2003 UC_{267}	—	October 28, 2003	Socorro	LINEAR	·	3.4 km	MPC · JPL
402092	2003 UG_{268}	—	October 28, 2003	Socorro	LINEAR	NYS	1.3 km	MPC · JPL
402093	2003 UF_{280}	—	October 27, 2003	Socorro	LINEAR	·	1.4 km	MPC · JPL
402094	2003 UQ_{297}	—	October 16, 2003	Kitt Peak	Spacewatch	·	860 m	MPC · JPL
402095	2003 UC_{308}	—	October 18, 2003	Kitt Peak	Spacewatch	·	1.2 km	MPC · JPL
402096	2003 US_{315}	—	October 20, 2003	Kitt Peak	Spacewatch	·	1.1 km	MPC · JPL
402097	2003 UP_{317}	—	October 22, 2003	Apache Point	SDSS	·	2.0 km	MPC · JPL
402098	2003 WK_{3}	—	October 24, 2003	Socorro	LINEAR	NYS	1.4 km	MPC · JPL
402099	2003 WN_{13}	—	November 16, 2003	Kitt Peak	Spacewatch	·	960 m	MPC · JPL
402100	2003 WW_{38}	—	November 19, 2003	Socorro	LINEAR	·	1.7 km	MPC · JPL

== 402101–402200 ==
back to top

Designation			Discovery			Properties		Ref
Permanent	Provisional	Named after	Date	Site	Discoverer(s)	Category	Diam.	Ref
402101	2003 WD_{65}	—	November 19, 2003	Kitt Peak	Spacewatch	·	1.2 km	MPC · JPL
402102	2003 WX_{106}	—	November 22, 2003	Kitt Peak	Spacewatch	·	1.5 km	MPC · JPL
402103	2003 WM_{109}	—	November 20, 2003	Socorro	LINEAR	·	860 m	MPC · JPL
402104	2003 WT_{158}	—	November 28, 2003	Kitt Peak	Spacewatch	NYS	1.3 km	MPC · JPL
402105	2003 XP_{12}	—	December 14, 2003	Palomar	NEAT	·	1.8 km	MPC · JPL
402106	2003 XQ_{24}	—	November 20, 2003	Kitt Peak	Spacewatch	·	1.4 km	MPC · JPL
402107	2003 YB_{47}	—	December 17, 2003	Kitt Peak	Spacewatch	NYS	1.1 km	MPC · JPL
402108	2003 YZ_{89}	—	December 19, 2003	Kitt Peak	Spacewatch	EUN	1.4 km	MPC · JPL
402109	2004 AS_{9}	—	January 15, 2004	Kitt Peak	Spacewatch	·	1.1 km	MPC · JPL
402110	2004 BE_{20}	—	January 18, 2004	Palomar	NEAT	·	1.6 km	MPC · JPL
402111	2004 BZ_{65}	—	January 22, 2004	Socorro	LINEAR	·	1.1 km	MPC · JPL
402112	2004 BO_{102}	—	January 31, 2004	Campo Imperatore	CINEOS	HNS	1.2 km	MPC · JPL
402113	2004 BY_{105}	—	January 26, 2004	Anderson Mesa	LONEOS	·	1.4 km	MPC · JPL
402114	2004 BA_{112}	—	January 24, 2004	Socorro	LINEAR	·	1.4 km	MPC · JPL
402115	2004 BK_{162}	—	January 30, 2004	Socorro	LINEAR	HNS	1.4 km	MPC · JPL
402116	2004 CT_{2}	—	February 12, 2004	Goodricke-Pigott	R. A. Tucker	EUN	1.4 km	MPC · JPL
402117	2004 CN_{12}	—	February 11, 2004	Kitt Peak	Spacewatch	·	1.3 km	MPC · JPL
402118	2004 CB_{18}	—	February 10, 2004	Palomar	NEAT	·	1.5 km	MPC · JPL
402119	2004 CM_{39}	—	February 13, 2004	Bareggio	Bareggio	·	1.8 km	MPC · JPL
402120	2004 CJ_{55}	—	February 12, 2004	Kitt Peak	Spacewatch	·	1.5 km	MPC · JPL
402121	2004 CP_{118}	—	February 11, 2004	Kitt Peak	Spacewatch	·	1.1 km	MPC · JPL
402122	2004 DR_{28}	—	February 17, 2004	Kitt Peak	Spacewatch	·	1.4 km	MPC · JPL
402123	2004 EK_{3}	—	March 10, 2004	Palomar	NEAT	·	1.6 km	MPC · JPL
402124	2004 ER_{36}	—	February 26, 2004	Socorro	LINEAR	·	2.1 km	MPC · JPL
402125	2004 ER_{52}	—	March 15, 2004	Catalina	CSS	·	2.0 km	MPC · JPL
402126	2004 EW_{92}	—	March 15, 2004	Socorro	LINEAR	·	2.3 km	MPC · JPL
402127	2004 FK_{119}	—	March 23, 2004	Kitt Peak	Spacewatch	·	1.2 km	MPC · JPL
402128	2004 GE_{30}	—	April 12, 2004	Kitt Peak	Spacewatch	DOR	2.4 km	MPC · JPL
402129	2004 GS_{76}	—	April 15, 2004	Socorro	LINEAR	(32418)	2.3 km	MPC · JPL
402130	2004 HS_{42}	—	April 20, 2004	Socorro	LINEAR	·	2.8 km	MPC · JPL
402131	2004 LB_{30}	—	June 14, 2004	Kitt Peak	Spacewatch	·	610 m	MPC · JPL
402132	2004 OR_{1}	—	July 16, 2004	Socorro	LINEAR	·	2.5 km	MPC · JPL
402133	2004 PN_{26}	—	August 8, 2004	Socorro	LINEAR	·	1.8 km	MPC · JPL
402134	2004 PD_{29}	—	August 6, 2004	Campo Imperatore	CINEOS	·	2.9 km	MPC · JPL
402135	2004 PY_{29}	—	August 7, 2004	Palomar	NEAT	·	2.3 km	MPC · JPL
402136	2004 PE_{60}	—	August 9, 2004	Socorro	LINEAR	H	520 m	MPC · JPL
402137	2004 PP_{93}	—	August 12, 2004	Socorro	LINEAR	·	790 m	MPC · JPL
402138	2004 PC_{97}	—	August 11, 2004	Socorro	LINEAR	T_{j} (2.95)	1.6 km	MPC · JPL
402139	2004 QN_{3}	—	August 17, 2004	Socorro	LINEAR	·	790 m	MPC · JPL
402140	2004 QX_{3}	—	August 16, 2004	Palomar	NEAT	·	2.6 km	MPC · JPL
402141	2004 RU_{2}	—	September 5, 2004	Bergisch Gladbach	W. Bickel	·	820 m	MPC · JPL
402142	2004 RT_{14}	—	September 6, 2004	Siding Spring	SSS	·	610 m	MPC · JPL
402143	2004 RM_{26}	—	September 6, 2004	Palomar	NEAT	·	610 m	MPC · JPL
402144	2004 RR_{28}	—	August 12, 2004	Campo Imperatore	CINEOS	·	670 m	MPC · JPL
402145	2004 RM_{41}	—	September 7, 2004	Socorro	LINEAR	·	1.9 km	MPC · JPL
402146	2004 RQ_{49}	—	September 8, 2004	Socorro	LINEAR	·	860 m	MPC · JPL
402147	2004 RV_{67}	—	January 15, 1996	Kitt Peak	Spacewatch	·	2.6 km	MPC · JPL
402148	2004 RH_{74}	—	September 8, 2004	Socorro	LINEAR	·	4.0 km	MPC · JPL
402149	2004 RM_{113}	—	September 7, 2004	Socorro	LINEAR	·	620 m	MPC · JPL
402150	2004 RR_{139}	—	September 8, 2004	Socorro	LINEAR	·	630 m	MPC · JPL
402151	2004 RX_{146}	—	September 9, 2004	Socorro	LINEAR	·	730 m	MPC · JPL
402152	2004 RQ_{156}	—	September 10, 2004	Socorro	LINEAR	·	760 m	MPC · JPL
402153	2004 RS_{162}	—	September 11, 2004	Socorro	LINEAR	BRA	1.7 km	MPC · JPL
402154	2004 RF_{184}	—	September 10, 2004	Socorro	LINEAR	NAE	3.1 km	MPC · JPL
402155	2004 RR_{192}	—	September 10, 2004	Socorro	LINEAR	·	2.6 km	MPC · JPL
402156	2004 RE_{196}	—	September 10, 2004	Socorro	LINEAR	·	1.9 km	MPC · JPL
402157	2004 RN_{198}	—	September 10, 2004	Socorro	LINEAR	BRA	1.7 km	MPC · JPL
402158	2004 RW_{203}	—	September 10, 2004	Socorro	LINEAR	·	790 m	MPC · JPL
402159	2004 RM_{216}	—	September 11, 2004	Socorro	LINEAR	·	1.0 km	MPC · JPL
402160	2004 RB_{228}	—	September 9, 2004	Kitt Peak	Spacewatch	EOS	2.0 km	MPC · JPL
402161	2004 RK_{228}	—	September 9, 2004	Kitt Peak	Spacewatch	·	2.4 km	MPC · JPL
402162	2004 RE_{229}	—	September 9, 2004	Kitt Peak	Spacewatch	·	740 m	MPC · JPL
402163	2004 RB_{241}	—	September 10, 2004	Kitt Peak	Spacewatch	·	1.4 km	MPC · JPL
402164	2004 RK_{257}	—	September 9, 2004	Anderson Mesa	LONEOS	·	1.9 km	MPC · JPL
402165	2004 RY_{265}	—	September 10, 2004	Kitt Peak	Spacewatch	·	1.7 km	MPC · JPL
402166	2004 RK_{268}	—	September 11, 2004	Kitt Peak	Spacewatch	·	730 m	MPC · JPL
402167	2004 RX_{304}	—	September 8, 2004	Socorro	LINEAR	·	720 m	MPC · JPL
402168	2004 RB_{323}	—	September 13, 2004	Socorro	LINEAR	·	2.6 km	MPC · JPL
402169	2004 RW_{329}	—	September 12, 2004	Kitt Peak	Spacewatch	·	2.1 km	MPC · JPL
402170	2004 RJ_{336}	—	September 15, 2004	Kitt Peak	Spacewatch	·	630 m	MPC · JPL
402171	2004 RX_{342}	—	September 12, 2004	Kitt Peak	Spacewatch	·	2.5 km	MPC · JPL
402172	2004 SP_{36}	—	September 8, 2004	Socorro	LINEAR	·	610 m	MPC · JPL
402173	2004 SU_{44}	—	September 18, 2004	Socorro	LINEAR	·	860 m	MPC · JPL
402174	2004 SX_{50}	—	September 22, 2004	Kitt Peak	Spacewatch	·	1.5 km	MPC · JPL
402175	2004 TG_{4}	—	October 4, 2004	Kitt Peak	Spacewatch	·	1.4 km	MPC · JPL
402176	2004 TY_{31}	—	October 4, 2004	Kitt Peak	Spacewatch	·	2.0 km	MPC · JPL
402177	2004 TQ_{33}	—	October 4, 2004	Kitt Peak	Spacewatch	·	3.5 km	MPC · JPL
402178	2004 TS_{40}	—	October 4, 2004	Kitt Peak	Spacewatch	·	800 m	MPC · JPL
402179	2004 TV_{50}	—	October 4, 2004	Kitt Peak	Spacewatch	·	860 m	MPC · JPL
402180	2004 TV_{67}	—	October 5, 2004	Anderson Mesa	LONEOS	·	2.3 km	MPC · JPL
402181	2004 TF_{73}	—	October 6, 2004	Kitt Peak	Spacewatch	·	3.5 km	MPC · JPL
402182	2004 TP_{73}	—	October 6, 2004	Kitt Peak	Spacewatch	·	620 m	MPC · JPL
402183	2004 TF_{87}	—	October 5, 2004	Kitt Peak	Spacewatch	V	770 m	MPC · JPL
402184	2004 TZ_{97}	—	October 5, 2004	Kitt Peak	Spacewatch	·	3.0 km	MPC · JPL
402185	2004 TC_{98}	—	September 7, 2004	Kitt Peak	Spacewatch	·	770 m	MPC · JPL
402186	2004 TN_{101}	—	October 6, 2004	Kitt Peak	Spacewatch	EOS	2.0 km	MPC · JPL
402187	2004 TN_{105}	—	October 7, 2004	Kitt Peak	Spacewatch	·	1.3 km	MPC · JPL
402188	2004 TQ_{111}	—	October 7, 2004	Kitt Peak	Spacewatch	·	1.8 km	MPC · JPL
402189	2004 TN_{139}	—	October 9, 2004	Anderson Mesa	LONEOS	EOS	2.3 km	MPC · JPL
402190	2004 TA_{149}	—	October 6, 2004	Kitt Peak	Spacewatch	·	1.7 km	MPC · JPL
402191	2004 TR_{161}	—	October 6, 2004	Kitt Peak	Spacewatch	·	910 m	MPC · JPL
402192	2004 TQ_{162}	—	October 6, 2004	Kitt Peak	Spacewatch	·	910 m	MPC · JPL
402193	2004 TR_{185}	—	October 7, 2004	Kitt Peak	Spacewatch	(1298)	3.0 km	MPC · JPL
402194	2004 TU_{203}	—	October 7, 2004	Kitt Peak	Spacewatch	TIR	3.1 km	MPC · JPL
402195	2004 TE_{212}	—	October 8, 2004	Kitt Peak	Spacewatch	(1298)	3.0 km	MPC · JPL
402196	2004 TX_{218}	—	October 5, 2004	Kitt Peak	Spacewatch	·	2.7 km	MPC · JPL
402197	2004 TJ_{228}	—	September 7, 2004	Kitt Peak	Spacewatch	·	2.8 km	MPC · JPL
402198	2004 TK_{277}	—	October 9, 2004	Kitt Peak	Spacewatch	V	560 m	MPC · JPL
402199	2004 TR_{285}	—	October 8, 2004	Socorro	LINEAR	EOS	2.6 km	MPC · JPL
402200	2004 TE_{287}	—	October 9, 2004	Kitt Peak	Spacewatch	·	2.0 km	MPC · JPL

== 402201–402300 ==
back to top

Designation			Discovery			Properties		Ref
Permanent	Provisional	Named after	Date	Site	Discoverer(s)	Category	Diam.	Ref
402201	2004 TX_{367}	—	October 6, 2004	Kitt Peak	Spacewatch	·	2.5 km	MPC · JPL
402202	2004 VC_{14}	—	November 4, 2004	Catalina	CSS	·	900 m	MPC · JPL
402203	2004 VW_{20}	—	November 4, 2004	Catalina	CSS	·	800 m	MPC · JPL
402204	2004 VZ_{74}	—	November 12, 2004	Catalina	CSS	·	2.1 km	MPC · JPL
402205	2004 VU_{88}	—	October 10, 2004	Kitt Peak	Spacewatch	·	1.9 km	MPC · JPL
402206	2004 VE_{112}	—	November 3, 2004	Anderson Mesa	LONEOS	·	870 m	MPC · JPL
402207	2004 WO_{1}	—	November 17, 2004	Campo Imperatore	CINEOS	·	2.3 km	MPC · JPL
402208	2004 XN_{9}	—	October 15, 2004	Mount Lemmon	Mount Lemmon Survey	(2076)	980 m	MPC · JPL
402209	2004 XL_{42}	—	December 2, 2004	Catalina	CSS	·	2.4 km	MPC · JPL
402210	2004 XJ_{118}	—	December 12, 2004	Kitt Peak	Spacewatch	LIX	3.7 km	MPC · JPL
402211	2004 XJ_{119}	—	December 12, 2004	Kitt Peak	Spacewatch	·	4.2 km	MPC · JPL
402212	2004 XE_{124}	—	December 10, 2004	Socorro	LINEAR	·	4.0 km	MPC · JPL
402213	2004 XG_{146}	—	December 14, 2004	Socorro	LINEAR	·	1.3 km	MPC · JPL
402214	2004 XV_{165}	—	December 2, 2004	Socorro	LINEAR	LIX	3.5 km	MPC · JPL
402215	2004 YW_{13}	—	December 19, 2004	Mount Lemmon	Mount Lemmon Survey	·	1.3 km	MPC · JPL
402216	2005 AQ_{30}	—	January 9, 2005	Catalina	CSS	H	570 m	MPC · JPL
402217	2005 AY_{30}	—	December 16, 2004	Kitt Peak	Spacewatch	·	4.0 km	MPC · JPL
402218	2005 AE_{37}	—	January 13, 2005	Socorro	LINEAR	·	1.0 km	MPC · JPL
402219	2005 AM_{46}	—	January 11, 2005	Socorro	LINEAR	·	800 m	MPC · JPL
402220	2005 AV_{54}	—	January 15, 2005	Catalina	CSS	EUP	3.9 km	MPC · JPL
402221	2005 CF_{39}	—	February 9, 2005	La Silla	A. Boattini, H. Scholl	·	2.7 km	MPC · JPL
402222	2005 CZ_{64}	—	February 9, 2005	Mount Lemmon	Mount Lemmon Survey	·	990 m	MPC · JPL
402223	2005 EH_{108}	—	March 4, 2005	Catalina	CSS	·	4.0 km	MPC · JPL
402224	2005 EM_{145}	—	March 10, 2005	Mount Lemmon	Mount Lemmon Survey	·	990 m	MPC · JPL
402225	2005 EH_{151}	—	March 10, 2005	Kitt Peak	Spacewatch	·	1.1 km	MPC · JPL
402226	2005 EV_{152}	—	March 10, 2005	Kitt Peak	Spacewatch	·	1.7 km	MPC · JPL
402227	2005 EJ_{206}	—	March 13, 2005	Catalina	CSS	·	1.6 km	MPC · JPL
402228	2005 EK_{207}	—	March 8, 2005	Anderson Mesa	LONEOS	·	1.7 km	MPC · JPL
402229	2005 EH_{245}	—	March 2, 2001	Kitt Peak	Spacewatch	·	1.2 km	MPC · JPL
402230	2005 GX_{1}	—	April 1, 2005	Kitt Peak	Spacewatch	·	1.3 km	MPC · JPL
402231	2005 GB_{45}	—	April 5, 2005	Mount Lemmon	Mount Lemmon Survey	EUN	1.2 km	MPC · JPL
402232	2005 GN_{50}	—	April 5, 2005	Kitt Peak	Spacewatch	·	1.5 km	MPC · JPL
402233	2005 GG_{52}	—	April 2, 2005	Mount Lemmon	Mount Lemmon Survey	·	1.3 km	MPC · JPL
402234	2005 GA_{67}	—	April 2, 2005	Mount Lemmon	Mount Lemmon Survey	·	1.4 km	MPC · JPL
402235	2005 GE_{87}	—	April 4, 2005	Mount Lemmon	Mount Lemmon Survey	ADE	1.5 km	MPC · JPL
402236	2005 GK_{100}	—	April 9, 2005	Mount Lemmon	Mount Lemmon Survey	·	1.5 km	MPC · JPL
402237	2005 GR_{146}	—	March 11, 2005	Mount Lemmon	Mount Lemmon Survey	·	1.1 km	MPC · JPL
402238	2005 GG_{159}	—	April 12, 2005	Anderson Mesa	LONEOS	·	1.4 km	MPC · JPL
402239	2005 GK_{221}	—	April 6, 2005	Catalina	CSS	·	2.9 km	MPC · JPL
402240	2005 JW_{87}	—	May 10, 2005	Kitt Peak	Spacewatch	·	1.3 km	MPC · JPL
402241	2005 JH_{111}	—	May 8, 2005	Anderson Mesa	LONEOS	·	1.8 km	MPC · JPL
402242	2005 JV_{125}	—	May 11, 2005	Kitt Peak	Spacewatch	JUN	830 m	MPC · JPL
402243	2005 JF_{135}	—	May 14, 2005	Mount Lemmon	Mount Lemmon Survey	·	1.3 km	MPC · JPL
402244	2005 JJ_{137}	—	May 4, 2005	Kitt Peak	Spacewatch	·	1.5 km	MPC · JPL
402245	2005 JO_{137}	—	May 13, 2005	Kitt Peak	Spacewatch	JUN	780 m	MPC · JPL
402246	2005 KN_{7}	—	May 20, 2005	Palomar	NEAT	·	1.6 km	MPC · JPL
402247	2005 KH_{11}	—	May 31, 2005	Catalina	CSS	·	4.0 km	MPC · JPL
402248	2005 LZ_{31}	—	June 1, 2005	Kitt Peak	Spacewatch	·	1.5 km	MPC · JPL
402249	2005 LF_{39}	—	June 3, 2005	Kitt Peak	Spacewatch	·	2.2 km	MPC · JPL
402250	2005 MK	—	June 16, 2005	Mount Lemmon	Mount Lemmon Survey	EUN	1.5 km	MPC · JPL
402251	2005 MP_{27}	—	June 18, 2005	Mount Lemmon	Mount Lemmon Survey	·	1.4 km	MPC · JPL
402252	2005 MX_{27}	—	June 29, 2005	Kitt Peak	Spacewatch	·	1.5 km	MPC · JPL
402253	2005 ME_{48}	—	June 29, 2005	Kitt Peak	Spacewatch	·	2.1 km	MPC · JPL
402254	2005 NH_{6}	—	July 4, 2005	Mount Lemmon	Mount Lemmon Survey	·	2.0 km	MPC · JPL
402255	2005 NY_{11}	—	July 4, 2005	Kitt Peak	Spacewatch	·	2.0 km	MPC · JPL
402256	2005 NR_{18}	—	July 4, 2005	Mount Lemmon	Mount Lemmon Survey	·	1.5 km	MPC · JPL
402257	2005 OF_{18}	—	July 12, 2005	Kitt Peak	Spacewatch	AGN	1.1 km	MPC · JPL
402258	2005 PU_{10}	—	August 4, 2005	Palomar	NEAT	·	1.9 km	MPC · JPL
402259	2005 QE_{45}	—	August 26, 2005	Palomar	NEAT	·	1.8 km	MPC · JPL
402260	2005 QU_{73}	—	August 2, 2005	Socorro	LINEAR	·	2.7 km	MPC · JPL
402261	2005 QV_{81}	—	August 29, 2005	Socorro	LINEAR	(13314)	1.5 km	MPC · JPL
402262	2005 QZ_{122}	—	August 28, 2005	Kitt Peak	Spacewatch	·	730 m	MPC · JPL
402263	2005 QO_{131}	—	August 28, 2005	Kitt Peak	Spacewatch	·	1.6 km	MPC · JPL
402264	2005 QU_{135}	—	August 28, 2005	Kitt Peak	Spacewatch	MRX	780 m	MPC · JPL
402265	2005 QD_{157}	—	August 30, 2005	Palomar	NEAT	·	2.8 km	MPC · JPL
402266	2005 QM_{164}	—	August 31, 2005	Palomar	NEAT	·	1.9 km	MPC · JPL
402267	2005 QE_{166}	—	August 30, 2005	Anderson Mesa	LONEOS	AMO +1km	1.4 km	MPC · JPL
402268	2005 QE_{169}	—	August 29, 2005	Palomar	NEAT	TIN	1.1 km	MPC · JPL
402269	2005 QP_{172}	—	August 29, 2005	Palomar	NEAT	·	1.8 km	MPC · JPL
402270	2005 QB_{188}	—	August 29, 2005	Kitt Peak	Spacewatch	·	2.3 km	MPC · JPL
402271	2005 QD_{190}	—	August 31, 2005	Kitt Peak	Spacewatch	·	1.5 km	MPC · JPL
402272	2005 RS_{19}	—	September 1, 2005	Kitt Peak	Spacewatch	AGN	1.1 km	MPC · JPL
402273	2005 RF_{27}	—	September 10, 2005	Anderson Mesa	LONEOS	·	2.6 km	MPC · JPL
402274	2005 SC_{13}	—	September 24, 2005	Kitt Peak	Spacewatch	·	1.8 km	MPC · JPL
402275	2005 SR_{20}	—	September 25, 2005	Catalina	CSS	·	2.5 km	MPC · JPL
402276	2005 SR_{27}	—	September 23, 2005	Kitt Peak	Spacewatch	MRX	1.0 km	MPC · JPL
402277	2005 SU_{53}	—	September 25, 2005	Kitt Peak	Spacewatch	·	1.9 km	MPC · JPL
402278	2005 SS_{91}	—	September 24, 2005	Kitt Peak	Spacewatch	KOR	1.2 km	MPC · JPL
402279	2005 SP_{96}	—	September 25, 2005	Kitt Peak	Spacewatch	GEF	1.4 km	MPC · JPL
402280	2005 SU_{98}	—	September 25, 2005	Kitt Peak	Spacewatch	·	1.5 km	MPC · JPL
402281	2005 SC_{118}	—	September 28, 2005	Palomar	NEAT	GEF	1.2 km	MPC · JPL
402282	2005 SU_{121}	—	September 29, 2005	Anderson Mesa	LONEOS	·	2.2 km	MPC · JPL
402283	2005 SR_{141}	—	September 25, 2005	Kitt Peak	Spacewatch	·	1.7 km	MPC · JPL
402284	2005 SL_{162}	—	September 27, 2005	Kitt Peak	Spacewatch	·	3.4 km	MPC · JPL
402285	2005 SE_{164}	—	September 27, 2005	Palomar	NEAT	JUN	1.4 km	MPC · JPL
402286	2005 SR_{174}	—	September 29, 2005	Kitt Peak	Spacewatch	·	1.9 km	MPC · JPL
402287	2005 ST_{175}	—	September 29, 2005	Kitt Peak	Spacewatch	·	1.9 km	MPC · JPL
402288	2005 SP_{180}	—	September 29, 2005	Mount Lemmon	Mount Lemmon Survey	·	2.0 km	MPC · JPL
402289	2005 SZ_{192}	—	September 29, 2005	Kitt Peak	Spacewatch	·	2.5 km	MPC · JPL
402290	2005 SC_{197}	—	September 30, 2005	Kitt Peak	Spacewatch	·	650 m	MPC · JPL
402291	2005 SH_{200}	—	September 30, 2005	Kitt Peak	Spacewatch	·	1.8 km	MPC · JPL
402292	2005 SS_{200}	—	September 30, 2005	Kitt Peak	Spacewatch	·	2.0 km	MPC · JPL
402293	2005 SB_{207}	—	September 30, 2005	Goodricke-Pigott	R. A. Tucker	·	1.9 km	MPC · JPL
402294	2005 SR_{212}	—	September 30, 2005	Mount Lemmon	Mount Lemmon Survey	AGN	1.3 km	MPC · JPL
402295	2005 SW_{221}	—	September 27, 2005	Socorro	LINEAR	·	2.0 km	MPC · JPL
402296	2005 SB_{241}	—	September 30, 2005	Kitt Peak	Spacewatch	·	2.1 km	MPC · JPL
402297	2005 SH_{242}	—	September 12, 2005	Kitt Peak	Spacewatch	DOR	2.2 km	MPC · JPL
402298	2005 SL_{242}	—	September 30, 2005	Kitt Peak	Spacewatch	GEF	1.1 km	MPC · JPL
402299	2005 SN_{245}	—	September 30, 2005	Mount Lemmon	Mount Lemmon Survey	·	1.9 km	MPC · JPL
402300	2005 SX_{247}	—	September 30, 2005	Kitt Peak	Spacewatch	HOF	2.6 km	MPC · JPL

== 402301–402400 ==
back to top

Designation			Discovery			Properties		Ref
Permanent	Provisional	Named after	Date	Site	Discoverer(s)	Category	Diam.	Ref
402301	2005 SZ_{249}	—	September 23, 2005	Catalina	CSS	·	1.9 km	MPC · JPL
402302	2005 SS_{279}	—	September 23, 2005	Kitt Peak	Spacewatch	·	1.8 km	MPC · JPL
402303	2005 SF_{280}	—	September 25, 2005	Kitt Peak	Spacewatch	HOF	2.6 km	MPC · JPL
402304	2005 SC_{290}	—	September 29, 2005	Kitt Peak	Spacewatch	·	1.7 km	MPC · JPL
402305	2005 TO_{30}	—	August 31, 2005	Socorro	LINEAR	·	2.1 km	MPC · JPL
402306	2005 TK_{35}	—	October 1, 2005	Kitt Peak	Spacewatch	KOR	1.2 km	MPC · JPL
402307	2005 TN_{43}	—	September 30, 2005	Mount Lemmon	Mount Lemmon Survey	AGN	1.3 km	MPC · JPL
402308	2005 TS_{50}	—	June 17, 2005	Mount Lemmon	Mount Lemmon Survey	·	1.8 km	MPC · JPL
402309	2005 TL_{78}	—	September 25, 2005	Kitt Peak	Spacewatch	DOR	2.1 km	MPC · JPL
402310	2005 TV_{87}	—	October 5, 2005	Kitt Peak	Spacewatch	AGN	1.1 km	MPC · JPL
402311	2005 TH_{110}	—	October 7, 2005	Kitt Peak	Spacewatch	·	2.3 km	MPC · JPL
402312	2005 TK_{111}	—	October 7, 2005	Kitt Peak	Spacewatch	MRX	1.2 km	MPC · JPL
402313	2005 TH_{118}	—	September 26, 2005	Kitt Peak	Spacewatch	KOR	1.1 km	MPC · JPL
402314	2005 TD_{123}	—	September 29, 2005	Mount Lemmon	Mount Lemmon Survey	KOR	1.1 km	MPC · JPL
402315	2005 TL_{124}	—	October 7, 2005	Kitt Peak	Spacewatch	·	1.6 km	MPC · JPL
402316	2005 TC_{125}	—	October 7, 2005	Kitt Peak	Spacewatch	·	1.5 km	MPC · JPL
402317	2005 TR_{125}	—	October 7, 2005	Kitt Peak	Spacewatch	·	680 m	MPC · JPL
402318	2005 TD_{136}	—	September 30, 2005	Anderson Mesa	LONEOS	GEF	1.1 km	MPC · JPL
402319	2005 TH_{137}	—	October 6, 2005	Kitt Peak	Spacewatch	HOF	2.3 km	MPC · JPL
402320	2005 TF_{143}	—	October 8, 2005	Kitt Peak	Spacewatch	·	810 m	MPC · JPL
402321	2005 TH_{159}	—	October 1, 2005	Mount Lemmon	Mount Lemmon Survey	·	1.8 km	MPC · JPL
402322	2005 TF_{177}	—	October 1, 2005	Mount Lemmon	Mount Lemmon Survey	·	3.1 km	MPC · JPL
402323	2005 UZ_{3}	—	October 26, 2005	Mount Graham	Ryan, W. H.	·	1.8 km	MPC · JPL
402324	2005 UO_{32}	—	October 1, 2005	Mount Lemmon	Mount Lemmon Survey	·	1.7 km	MPC · JPL
402325	2005 UF_{56}	—	October 23, 2005	Catalina	CSS	·	2.8 km	MPC · JPL
402326	2005 UB_{72}	—	October 10, 2005	Catalina	CSS	DOR	3.0 km	MPC · JPL
402327	2005 US_{84}	—	October 22, 2005	Kitt Peak	Spacewatch	·	1.7 km	MPC · JPL
402328	2005 UJ_{88}	—	October 22, 2005	Kitt Peak	Spacewatch	KOR	1.4 km	MPC · JPL
402329	2005 UO_{89}	—	October 22, 2005	Kitt Peak	Spacewatch	·	950 m	MPC · JPL
402330	2005 UB_{120}	—	October 24, 2005	Kitt Peak	Spacewatch	KOR	1.1 km	MPC · JPL
402331	2005 UH_{168}	—	October 24, 2005	Kitt Peak	Spacewatch	·	1.5 km	MPC · JPL
402332	2005 UX_{197}	—	October 1, 2005	Mount Lemmon	Mount Lemmon Survey	KOR	1.1 km	MPC · JPL
402333	2005 UT_{206}	—	October 1, 2005	Kitt Peak	Spacewatch	KOR	1.1 km	MPC · JPL
402334	2005 UV_{271}	—	October 28, 2005	Kitt Peak	Spacewatch	·	1.8 km	MPC · JPL
402335	2005 UY_{287}	—	October 26, 2005	Kitt Peak	Spacewatch	·	1.6 km	MPC · JPL
402336	2005 UA_{291}	—	October 26, 2005	Kitt Peak	Spacewatch	·	710 m	MPC · JPL
402337	2005 UN_{323}	—	October 28, 2005	Kitt Peak	Spacewatch	·	2.6 km	MPC · JPL
402338	2005 UC_{341}	—	October 27, 2005	Kitt Peak	Spacewatch	·	1.9 km	MPC · JPL
402339	2005 UJ_{343}	—	October 31, 2005	Kitt Peak	Spacewatch	·	2.1 km	MPC · JPL
402340	2005 UD_{371}	—	October 27, 2005	Mount Lemmon	Mount Lemmon Survey	·	1.6 km	MPC · JPL
402341	2005 US_{400}	—	October 27, 2005	Mount Lemmon	Mount Lemmon Survey	·	1.7 km	MPC · JPL
402342	2005 UG_{429}	—	October 28, 2005	Kitt Peak	Spacewatch	KOR	1.2 km	MPC · JPL
402343	2005 UC_{461}	—	October 28, 2005	Mount Lemmon	Mount Lemmon Survey	·	1.8 km	MPC · JPL
402344	2005 UL_{500}	—	October 27, 2005	Anderson Mesa	LONEOS	·	990 m	MPC · JPL
402345	2005 UB_{511}	—	October 26, 2005	Kitt Peak	Spacewatch	·	900 m	MPC · JPL
402346	2005 UM_{521}	—	October 26, 2005	Apache Point	A. C. Becker	AGN	950 m	MPC · JPL
402347	2005 UQ_{521}	—	October 26, 2005	Apache Point	A. C. Becker	AGN	1 km	MPC · JPL
402348	2005 UZ_{522}	—	October 27, 2005	Apache Point	A. C. Becker	·	2.3 km	MPC · JPL
402349	2005 UR_{527}	—	October 27, 2005	Mount Lemmon	Mount Lemmon Survey	·	1.7 km	MPC · JPL
402350	2005 VO_{8}	—	October 25, 2005	Kitt Peak	Spacewatch	·	1.7 km	MPC · JPL
402351	2005 VY_{31}	—	October 25, 2005	Mount Lemmon	Mount Lemmon Survey	·	2.1 km	MPC · JPL
402352	2005 VF_{54}	—	November 4, 2005	Kitt Peak	Spacewatch	·	1.6 km	MPC · JPL
402353	2005 VC_{55}	—	November 4, 2005	Catalina	CSS	AGN	1.2 km	MPC · JPL
402354	2005 VK_{58}	—	October 25, 2005	Kitt Peak	Spacewatch	·	1.7 km	MPC · JPL
402355	2005 VW_{76}	—	November 4, 2005	Socorro	LINEAR	·	2.3 km	MPC · JPL
402356	2005 VX_{87}	—	October 29, 2005	Kitt Peak	Spacewatch	·	2.0 km	MPC · JPL
402357	2005 VL_{113}	—	November 10, 2005	Kitt Peak	Spacewatch	·	2.2 km	MPC · JPL
402358	2005 VU_{117}	—	November 12, 2005	Kitt Peak	Spacewatch	·	630 m	MPC · JPL
402359	2005 VE_{124}	—	November 5, 2005	Kitt Peak	Spacewatch	·	1.5 km	MPC · JPL
402360	2005 VQ_{130}	—	November 1, 2005	Apache Point	A. C. Becker	·	1.7 km	MPC · JPL
402361	2005 VV_{134}	—	November 1, 2005	Mauna Kea	P. A. Wiegert	·	1.9 km	MPC · JPL
402362	2005 WL_{17}	—	November 22, 2005	Kitt Peak	Spacewatch	·	810 m	MPC · JPL
402363	2005 WW_{18}	—	November 22, 2005	Kitt Peak	Spacewatch	·	3.7 km	MPC · JPL
402364	2005 WB_{28}	—	November 21, 2005	Kitt Peak	Spacewatch	·	1.8 km	MPC · JPL
402365	2005 WC_{38}	—	November 22, 2005	Kitt Peak	Spacewatch	·	1.9 km	MPC · JPL
402366	2005 WP_{42}	—	November 21, 2005	Kitt Peak	Spacewatch	·	750 m	MPC · JPL
402367	2005 WD_{62}	—	November 25, 2005	Kitt Peak	Spacewatch	·	2.2 km	MPC · JPL
402368	2005 WT_{135}	—	November 26, 2005	Kitt Peak	Spacewatch	·	1.9 km	MPC · JPL
402369	2005 WY_{154}	—	November 29, 2005	Kitt Peak	Spacewatch	·	1.5 km	MPC · JPL
402370	2005 WH_{178}	—	November 30, 2005	Kitt Peak	Spacewatch	·	2.1 km	MPC · JPL
402371	2005 WN_{210}	—	November 25, 2005	Mount Lemmon	Mount Lemmon Survey	·	1.8 km	MPC · JPL
402372	2005 WO_{210}	—	November 25, 2005	Kitt Peak	Spacewatch	EOS	2.1 km	MPC · JPL
402373	2005 XG_{4}	—	December 3, 2005	Pla D'Arguines	R. Ferrando	·	2.3 km	MPC · JPL
402374	2005 XO_{21}	—	November 1, 2005	Kitt Peak	Spacewatch	KOR	1.1 km	MPC · JPL
402375	2005 XX_{31}	—	December 2, 2005	Mount Lemmon	Mount Lemmon Survey	·	1.7 km	MPC · JPL
402376	2005 XT_{43}	—	December 2, 2005	Kitt Peak	Spacewatch	KOR	1.3 km	MPC · JPL
402377	2005 XJ_{75}	—	December 6, 2005	Kitt Peak	Spacewatch	·	650 m	MPC · JPL
402378	2005 XS_{84}	—	December 10, 2005	Catalina	CSS	H	650 m	MPC · JPL
402379	2005 XO_{110}	—	December 1, 2005	Kitt Peak	M. W. Buie	NYS	960 m	MPC · JPL
402380	2005 YC_{21}	—	December 4, 2005	Mount Lemmon	Mount Lemmon Survey	·	3.0 km	MPC · JPL
402381	2005 YK_{53}	—	December 22, 2005	Kitt Peak	Spacewatch	·	2.5 km	MPC · JPL
402382	2005 YY_{64}	—	December 25, 2005	Kitt Peak	Spacewatch	·	630 m	MPC · JPL
402383	2005 YY_{68}	—	December 26, 2005	Kitt Peak	Spacewatch	·	650 m	MPC · JPL
402384	2005 YC_{69}	—	December 5, 2005	Mount Lemmon	Mount Lemmon Survey	·	3.2 km	MPC · JPL
402385	2005 YX_{69}	—	December 26, 2005	Kitt Peak	Spacewatch	·	3.3 km	MPC · JPL
402386	2005 YX_{70}	—	December 27, 2005	Catalina	CSS	·	4.7 km	MPC · JPL
402387	2005 YM_{71}	—	December 24, 2005	Kitt Peak	Spacewatch	·	1.9 km	MPC · JPL
402388	2005 YT_{72}	—	December 24, 2005	Kitt Peak	Spacewatch	EMA	3.3 km	MPC · JPL
402389	2005 YU_{77}	—	October 27, 2005	Mount Lemmon	Mount Lemmon Survey	·	1.9 km	MPC · JPL
402390	2005 YZ_{78}	—	December 24, 2005	Kitt Peak	Spacewatch	EOS	2.0 km	MPC · JPL
402391	2005 YL_{79}	—	December 24, 2005	Kitt Peak	Spacewatch	·	610 m	MPC · JPL
402392	2005 YE_{83}	—	December 24, 2005	Kitt Peak	Spacewatch	·	3.3 km	MPC · JPL
402393	2005 YM_{88}	—	December 25, 2005	Mount Lemmon	Mount Lemmon Survey	·	3.0 km	MPC · JPL
402394	2005 YM_{90}	—	November 30, 2005	Mount Lemmon	Mount Lemmon Survey	EOS	2.4 km	MPC · JPL
402395	2005 YW_{97}	—	December 24, 2005	Kitt Peak	Spacewatch	·	800 m	MPC · JPL
402396	2005 YM_{98}	—	December 26, 2005	Kitt Peak	Spacewatch	·	4.0 km	MPC · JPL
402397	2005 YA_{104}	—	December 25, 2005	Kitt Peak	Spacewatch	KOR	1.4 km	MPC · JPL
402398	2005 YX_{114}	—	December 25, 2005	Kitt Peak	Spacewatch	·	4.1 km	MPC · JPL
402399	2005 YJ_{116}	—	December 25, 2005	Kitt Peak	Spacewatch	·	1.9 km	MPC · JPL
402400	2005 YJ_{118}	—	December 25, 2005	Kitt Peak	Spacewatch	·	2.1 km	MPC · JPL

== 402401–402500 ==
back to top

Designation			Discovery			Properties		Ref
Permanent	Provisional	Named after	Date	Site	Discoverer(s)	Category	Diam.	Ref
402401	2005 YL_{120}	—	December 27, 2005	Mount Lemmon	Mount Lemmon Survey	·	510 m	MPC · JPL
402402	2005 YJ_{123}	—	December 24, 2005	Socorro	LINEAR	·	2.8 km	MPC · JPL
402403	2005 YH_{128}	—	December 28, 2005	Mount Lemmon	Mount Lemmon Survey	·	3.9 km	MPC · JPL
402404	2005 YG_{129}	—	December 24, 2005	Kitt Peak	Spacewatch	·	3.0 km	MPC · JPL
402405	2005 YU_{132}	—	November 10, 2005	Mount Lemmon	Mount Lemmon Survey	EOS	2.0 km	MPC · JPL
402406	2005 YR_{134}	—	December 26, 2005	Kitt Peak	Spacewatch	·	2.8 km	MPC · JPL
402407	2005 YA_{139}	—	December 27, 2005	Mount Lemmon	Mount Lemmon Survey	·	1.8 km	MPC · JPL
402408	2005 YT_{142}	—	December 28, 2005	Mount Lemmon	Mount Lemmon Survey	·	530 m	MPC · JPL
402409	2005 YR_{148}	—	December 25, 2005	Kitt Peak	Spacewatch	EOS	2.1 km	MPC · JPL
402410	2005 YP_{150}	—	December 25, 2005	Kitt Peak	Spacewatch	·	3.2 km	MPC · JPL
402411	2005 YO_{154}	—	December 29, 2005	Kitt Peak	Spacewatch	·	690 m	MPC · JPL
402412	2005 YH_{158}	—	December 2, 2005	Mount Lemmon	Mount Lemmon Survey	·	2.8 km	MPC · JPL
402413	2005 YY_{169}	—	December 31, 2005	Kitt Peak	Spacewatch	EOS	2.1 km	MPC · JPL
402414	2005 YP_{179}	—	December 1, 2005	Mount Lemmon	Mount Lemmon Survey	·	2.5 km	MPC · JPL
402415	2005 YV_{191}	—	December 30, 2005	Kitt Peak	Spacewatch	·	870 m	MPC · JPL
402416	2005 YL_{192}	—	December 30, 2005	Kitt Peak	Spacewatch	·	2.5 km	MPC · JPL
402417	2005 YV_{196}	—	December 2, 2005	Mount Lemmon	Mount Lemmon Survey	EOS	1.7 km	MPC · JPL
402418	2005 YH_{201}	—	December 22, 2005	Kitt Peak	Spacewatch	EOS	2.0 km	MPC · JPL
402419	2005 YJ_{208}	—	December 29, 2005	Palomar	NEAT	·	2.7 km	MPC · JPL
402420	2005 YK_{208}	—	December 30, 2005	Catalina	CSS	EUP	3.5 km	MPC · JPL
402421	2005 YG_{235}	—	December 5, 2005	Mount Lemmon	Mount Lemmon Survey	·	2.8 km	MPC · JPL
402422	2005 YH_{270}	—	December 27, 2005	Kitt Peak	Spacewatch	EOS	2.0 km	MPC · JPL
402423	2005 YC_{274}	—	December 30, 2005	Mount Lemmon	Mount Lemmon Survey	EOS	1.6 km	MPC · JPL
402424	2006 AR_{11}	—	January 2, 2006	Mount Lemmon	Mount Lemmon Survey	·	3.2 km	MPC · JPL
402425	2006 AO_{26}	—	December 26, 2005	Kitt Peak	Spacewatch	TIR	2.5 km	MPC · JPL
402426	2006 AW_{30}	—	January 5, 2006	Kitt Peak	Spacewatch	·	660 m	MPC · JPL
402427	2006 AN_{33}	—	January 2, 2006	Catalina	CSS	·	3.6 km	MPC · JPL
402428	2006 AC_{36}	—	January 4, 2006	Kitt Peak	Spacewatch	·	2.3 km	MPC · JPL
402429	2006 AG_{36}	—	January 4, 2006	Kitt Peak	Spacewatch	·	640 m	MPC · JPL
402430	2006 AP_{40}	—	December 25, 2005	Mount Lemmon	Mount Lemmon Survey	·	3.0 km	MPC · JPL
402431	2006 AK_{42}	—	January 6, 2006	Mount Lemmon	Mount Lemmon Survey	·	3.0 km	MPC · JPL
402432	2006 AE_{49}	—	January 5, 2006	Kitt Peak	Spacewatch	·	3.7 km	MPC · JPL
402433	2006 AD_{61}	—	January 5, 2006	Kitt Peak	Spacewatch	·	2.6 km	MPC · JPL
402434	2006 AX_{64}	—	December 2, 2005	Mount Lemmon	Mount Lemmon Survey	EOS	1.9 km	MPC · JPL
402435	2006 AD_{84}	—	January 6, 2006	Catalina	CSS	·	4.3 km	MPC · JPL
402436	2006 AM_{93}	—	January 7, 2006	Mount Lemmon	Mount Lemmon Survey	·	3.8 km	MPC · JPL
402437	2006 AW_{96}	—	January 1, 2006	Catalina	CSS	·	4.2 km	MPC · JPL
402438	2006 AK_{101}	—	January 9, 2006	Mount Lemmon	Mount Lemmon Survey	·	600 m	MPC · JPL
402439	2006 BZ_{12}	—	January 8, 2006	Mount Lemmon	Mount Lemmon Survey	·	720 m	MPC · JPL
402440	2006 BE_{31}	—	January 20, 2006	Kitt Peak	Spacewatch	·	3.3 km	MPC · JPL
402441	2006 BJ_{31}	—	January 20, 2006	Kitt Peak	Spacewatch	LUT	4.8 km	MPC · JPL
402442	2006 BQ_{34}	—	January 22, 2006	Mount Lemmon	Mount Lemmon Survey	·	2.0 km	MPC · JPL
402443	2006 BX_{35}	—	December 28, 2005	Mount Lemmon	Mount Lemmon Survey	·	3.5 km	MPC · JPL
402444	2006 BS_{44}	—	January 23, 2006	Mount Lemmon	Mount Lemmon Survey	·	3.4 km	MPC · JPL
402445	2006 BV_{45}	—	January 7, 2006	Mount Lemmon	Mount Lemmon Survey	·	960 m	MPC · JPL
402446	2006 BN_{52}	—	January 5, 2006	Mount Lemmon	Mount Lemmon Survey	VER	2.8 km	MPC · JPL
402447	2006 BK_{55}	—	January 26, 2006	Mount Lemmon	Mount Lemmon Survey	·	700 m	MPC · JPL
402448	2006 BX_{58}	—	January 23, 2006	Junk Bond	D. Healy	·	4.5 km	MPC · JPL
402449	2006 BE_{59}	—	January 23, 2006	Mount Lemmon	Mount Lemmon Survey	MAS	660 m	MPC · JPL
402450	2006 BP_{63}	—	January 22, 2006	Mount Lemmon	Mount Lemmon Survey	·	630 m	MPC · JPL
402451	2006 BC_{64}	—	November 30, 2005	Mount Lemmon	Mount Lemmon Survey	·	3.0 km	MPC · JPL
402452	2006 BJ_{64}	—	January 22, 2006	Mount Lemmon	Mount Lemmon Survey	·	2.2 km	MPC · JPL
402453	2006 BA_{87}	—	January 25, 2006	Kitt Peak	Spacewatch	·	810 m	MPC · JPL
402454	2006 BS_{87}	—	January 25, 2006	Kitt Peak	Spacewatch	·	740 m	MPC · JPL
402455	2006 BQ_{88}	—	December 6, 2005	Mount Lemmon	Mount Lemmon Survey	EOS	1.9 km	MPC · JPL
402456	2006 BM_{90}	—	January 25, 2006	Kitt Peak	Spacewatch	EOS	3.2 km	MPC · JPL
402457	2006 BE_{94}	—	January 26, 2006	Kitt Peak	Spacewatch	·	1.3 km	MPC · JPL
402458	2006 BD_{95}	—	January 26, 2006	Kitt Peak	Spacewatch	·	3.0 km	MPC · JPL
402459	2006 BV_{97}	—	January 27, 2006	Kitt Peak	Spacewatch	·	2.9 km	MPC · JPL
402460	2006 BL_{98}	—	January 7, 2006	Mount Lemmon	Mount Lemmon Survey	·	3.0 km	MPC · JPL
402461	2006 BO_{110}	—	January 25, 2006	Kitt Peak	Spacewatch	·	2.7 km	MPC · JPL
402462	2006 BV_{112}	—	January 25, 2006	Kitt Peak	Spacewatch	·	2.8 km	MPC · JPL
402463	2006 BM_{149}	—	January 23, 2006	Catalina	CSS	PHO	1.1 km	MPC · JPL
402464	2006 BB_{153}	—	January 25, 2006	Kitt Peak	Spacewatch	·	860 m	MPC · JPL
402465	2006 BU_{157}	—	January 25, 2006	Kitt Peak	Spacewatch	·	2.8 km	MPC · JPL
402466	2006 BA_{159}	—	January 26, 2006	Kitt Peak	Spacewatch	·	2.5 km	MPC · JPL
402467	2006 BW_{166}	—	January 26, 2006	Mount Lemmon	Mount Lemmon Survey	·	2.7 km	MPC · JPL
402468	2006 BK_{185}	—	November 25, 2005	Mount Lemmon	Mount Lemmon Survey	·	2.7 km	MPC · JPL
402469	2006 BK_{186}	—	January 28, 2006	Mount Lemmon	Mount Lemmon Survey	(2076)	760 m	MPC · JPL
402470	2006 BD_{198}	—	January 30, 2006	Kitt Peak	Spacewatch	EOS	3.0 km	MPC · JPL
402471	2006 BM_{201}	—	January 23, 2006	Kitt Peak	Spacewatch	·	1.0 km	MPC · JPL
402472	2006 BO_{201}	—	January 31, 2006	Kitt Peak	Spacewatch	·	2.4 km	MPC · JPL
402473	2006 BK_{209}	—	January 31, 2006	Mount Lemmon	Mount Lemmon Survey	·	530 m	MPC · JPL
402474	2006 BS_{224}	—	January 30, 2006	Kitt Peak	Spacewatch	·	4.1 km	MPC · JPL
402475	2006 BD_{240}	—	January 31, 2006	Kitt Peak	Spacewatch	EOS	2.1 km	MPC · JPL
402476	2006 BR_{240}	—	January 31, 2006	Kitt Peak	Spacewatch	·	540 m	MPC · JPL
402477	2006 BC_{243}	—	January 31, 2006	Kitt Peak	Spacewatch	·	3.2 km	MPC · JPL
402478	2006 BS_{261}	—	January 7, 2006	Mount Lemmon	Mount Lemmon Survey	·	750 m	MPC · JPL
402479	2006 BW_{273}	—	January 23, 2006	Kitt Peak	Spacewatch	·	4.2 km	MPC · JPL
402480	2006 BK_{274}	—	January 26, 2006	Kitt Peak	Spacewatch	·	4.2 km	MPC · JPL
402481	2006 BR_{282}	—	January 30, 2006	Kitt Peak	Spacewatch	·	660 m	MPC · JPL
402482	2006 CB_{2}	—	February 1, 2006	Kitt Peak	Spacewatch	·	3.5 km	MPC · JPL
402483	2006 CA_{14}	—	February 1, 2006	Kitt Peak	Spacewatch	·	960 m	MPC · JPL
402484	2006 CY_{24}	—	February 2, 2006	Kitt Peak	Spacewatch	EOS	2.2 km	MPC · JPL
402485	2006 CN_{29}	—	February 2, 2006	Kitt Peak	Spacewatch	·	3.5 km	MPC · JPL
402486	2006 CA_{35}	—	February 2, 2006	Mount Lemmon	Mount Lemmon Survey	V	600 m	MPC · JPL
402487	2006 CD_{42}	—	January 4, 2006	Mount Lemmon	Mount Lemmon Survey	PHO	890 m	MPC · JPL
402488	2006 CA_{45}	—	January 26, 2006	Catalina	CSS	·	660 m	MPC · JPL
402489	2006 CQ_{45}	—	January 10, 2006	Mount Lemmon	Mount Lemmon Survey	·	730 m	MPC · JPL
402490	2006 CH_{47}	—	January 25, 2006	Kitt Peak	Spacewatch	·	700 m	MPC · JPL
402491	2006 CR_{58}	—	February 5, 2006	Mount Lemmon	Mount Lemmon Survey	·	2.3 km	MPC · JPL
402492	2006 CT_{59}	—	February 6, 2006	Mount Lemmon	Mount Lemmon Survey	·	1.2 km	MPC · JPL
402493	2006 DS_{1}	—	February 20, 2006	Kitt Peak	Spacewatch	·	3.0 km	MPC · JPL
402494	2006 DZ_{7}	—	February 20, 2006	Kitt Peak	Spacewatch	·	1.6 km	MPC · JPL
402495	2006 DN_{9}	—	February 21, 2006	Catalina	CSS	THB	4.6 km	MPC · JPL
402496	2006 DW_{12}	—	January 31, 2006	Kitt Peak	Spacewatch	·	960 m	MPC · JPL
402497	2006 DP_{16}	—	February 20, 2006	Kitt Peak	Spacewatch	·	2.3 km	MPC · JPL
402498	2006 DC_{19}	—	February 20, 2006	Kitt Peak	Spacewatch	·	940 m	MPC · JPL
402499	2006 DJ_{26}	—	February 20, 2006	Mount Lemmon	Mount Lemmon Survey	·	3.3 km	MPC · JPL
402500	2006 DU_{38}	—	February 21, 2006	Mount Lemmon	Mount Lemmon Survey	·	3.9 km	MPC · JPL

== 402501–402600 ==
back to top

Designation			Discovery			Properties		Ref
Permanent	Provisional	Named after	Date	Site	Discoverer(s)	Category	Diam.	Ref
402501	2006 DC_{40}	—	February 22, 2006	Anderson Mesa	LONEOS	TIR	3.8 km	MPC · JPL
402502	2006 DP_{42}	—	February 20, 2006	Kitt Peak	Spacewatch	·	2.4 km	MPC · JPL
402503	2006 DO_{45}	—	January 30, 2006	Kitt Peak	Spacewatch	·	3.5 km	MPC · JPL
402504	2006 DK_{52}	—	February 24, 2006	Kitt Peak	Spacewatch	NYS	1.1 km	MPC · JPL
402505	2006 DZ_{55}	—	February 24, 2006	Mount Lemmon	Mount Lemmon Survey	·	2.9 km	MPC · JPL
402506	2006 DV_{79}	—	February 7, 2006	Mount Lemmon	Mount Lemmon Survey	·	850 m	MPC · JPL
402507	2006 DN_{82}	—	February 24, 2006	Kitt Peak	Spacewatch	EOS	2.7 km	MPC · JPL
402508	2006 DK_{89}	—	February 24, 2006	Kitt Peak	Spacewatch	ARM	4.2 km	MPC · JPL
402509	2006 DY_{93}	—	February 24, 2006	Kitt Peak	Spacewatch	·	1.0 km	MPC · JPL
402510	2006 DS_{98}	—	February 25, 2006	Kitt Peak	Spacewatch	·	1.0 km	MPC · JPL
402511	2006 DE_{105}	—	February 25, 2006	Mount Lemmon	Mount Lemmon Survey	·	1.0 km	MPC · JPL
402512	2006 DR_{107}	—	February 25, 2006	Kitt Peak	Spacewatch	·	1.0 km	MPC · JPL
402513	2006 DN_{121}	—	February 22, 2006	Anderson Mesa	LONEOS	T_{j} (2.99)	5.0 km	MPC · JPL
402514	2006 DQ_{123}	—	February 24, 2006	Mount Lemmon	Mount Lemmon Survey	·	4.6 km	MPC · JPL
402515	2006 DT_{134}	—	January 31, 2006	Kitt Peak	Spacewatch	NYS	920 m	MPC · JPL
402516	2006 DV_{138}	—	February 2, 2006	Mount Lemmon	Mount Lemmon Survey	·	1.2 km	MPC · JPL
402517	2006 DA_{141}	—	February 25, 2006	Kitt Peak	Spacewatch	·	940 m	MPC · JPL
402518	2006 DV_{157}	—	February 27, 2006	Kitt Peak	Spacewatch	·	3.6 km	MPC · JPL
402519	2006 DG_{158}	—	January 23, 2006	Mount Lemmon	Mount Lemmon Survey	·	3.4 km	MPC · JPL
402520	2006 DR_{161}	—	February 27, 2006	Mount Lemmon	Mount Lemmon Survey	·	3.6 km	MPC · JPL
402521	2006 DV_{195}	—	February 1, 2006	Kitt Peak	Spacewatch	·	1.1 km	MPC · JPL
402522	2006 DB_{205}	—	February 4, 2006	Kitt Peak	Spacewatch	·	2.9 km	MPC · JPL
402523	2006 EF_{12}	—	March 2, 2006	Kitt Peak	Spacewatch	·	3.4 km	MPC · JPL
402524	2006 ES_{13}	—	March 2, 2006	Kitt Peak	Spacewatch	·	4.0 km	MPC · JPL
402525	2006 ER_{21}	—	January 26, 2006	Mount Lemmon	Mount Lemmon Survey	·	910 m	MPC · JPL
402526	2006 EL_{24}	—	March 3, 2006	Kitt Peak	Spacewatch	·	2.3 km	MPC · JPL
402527	2006 EZ_{24}	—	March 3, 2006	Kitt Peak	Spacewatch	·	3.3 km	MPC · JPL
402528	2006 EC_{25}	—	March 3, 2006	Kitt Peak	Spacewatch	·	3.5 km	MPC · JPL
402529	2006 ES_{31}	—	March 3, 2006	Kitt Peak	Spacewatch	(2076)	770 m	MPC · JPL
402530	2006 EW_{45}	—	March 3, 2006	Kitt Peak	Spacewatch	·	2.9 km	MPC · JPL
402531	2006 ET_{55}	—	March 5, 2006	Kitt Peak	Spacewatch	·	640 m	MPC · JPL
402532	2006 ER_{67}	—	February 5, 2006	Mount Lemmon	Mount Lemmon Survey	·	2.4 km	MPC · JPL
402533	2006 EU_{74}	—	March 2, 2006	Kitt Peak	Spacewatch	·	910 m	MPC · JPL
402534	2006 FY_{10}	—	March 23, 2006	Kitt Peak	Spacewatch	MAS	770 m	MPC · JPL
402535	2006 FC_{24}	—	March 24, 2006	Kitt Peak	Spacewatch	·	1.0 km	MPC · JPL
402536	2006 FT_{42}	—	March 26, 2006	Mount Lemmon	Mount Lemmon Survey	·	880 m	MPC · JPL
402537	2006 FN_{43}	—	February 20, 2006	Mount Lemmon	Mount Lemmon Survey	·	1.1 km	MPC · JPL
402538	2006 FP_{53}	—	March 25, 2006	Kitt Peak	Spacewatch	V	670 m	MPC · JPL
402539	2006 GE_{1}	—	January 31, 2006	Mount Lemmon	Mount Lemmon Survey	·	910 m	MPC · JPL
402540	2006 GD_{49}	—	April 1, 2006	Siding Spring	SSS	PHO	1.2 km	MPC · JPL
402541	2006 HY_{11}	—	April 19, 2006	Kitt Peak	Spacewatch	·	1.1 km	MPC · JPL
402542	2006 HS_{48}	—	April 24, 2006	Kitt Peak	Spacewatch	·	1.0 km	MPC · JPL
402543	2006 HP_{66}	—	April 24, 2006	Kitt Peak	Spacewatch	NYS	1.2 km	MPC · JPL
402544	2006 HH_{112}	—	April 25, 2006	Mount Lemmon	Mount Lemmon Survey	·	3.4 km	MPC · JPL
402545	2006 JN_{4}	—	May 2, 2006	Mount Lemmon	Mount Lemmon Survey	·	1.5 km	MPC · JPL
402546	2006 JJ_{6}	—	May 2, 2006	Mount Nyukasa	Japan Aerospace Exploration Agency	·	1.3 km	MPC · JPL
402547	2006 JT_{9}	—	May 1, 2006	Kitt Peak	Spacewatch	·	1.1 km	MPC · JPL
402548	2006 JX_{20}	—	May 2, 2006	Kitt Peak	Spacewatch	·	1.3 km	MPC · JPL
402549	2006 JV_{44}	—	May 7, 2006	Mount Lemmon	Mount Lemmon Survey	·	920 m	MPC · JPL
402550	2006 KE_{53}	—	May 7, 2006	Mount Lemmon	Mount Lemmon Survey	·	1.1 km	MPC · JPL
402551	2006 KN_{62}	—	May 22, 2006	Kitt Peak	Spacewatch	·	1.5 km	MPC · JPL
402552	2006 KQ_{91}	—	May 25, 2006	Kitt Peak	Spacewatch	·	1.5 km	MPC · JPL
402553	2006 KW_{94}	—	May 25, 2006	Kitt Peak	Spacewatch	NYS	1.1 km	MPC · JPL
402554	2006 KM_{108}	—	May 31, 2006	Mount Lemmon	Mount Lemmon Survey	·	870 m	MPC · JPL
402555	2006 MU_{5}	—	May 23, 2006	Mount Lemmon	Mount Lemmon Survey	NYS	1.3 km	MPC · JPL
402556	2006 PX_{27}	—	August 14, 2006	Siding Spring	SSS	T_{j} (2.98) · 3:2	4.6 km	MPC · JPL
402557	2006 QU_{1}	—	August 17, 2006	Palomar	NEAT	H	770 m	MPC · JPL
402558	2006 QD_{18}	—	August 17, 2006	Palomar	NEAT	slow	980 m	MPC · JPL
402559	2006 QP_{19}	—	August 17, 2006	Palomar	NEAT	·	2.3 km	MPC · JPL
402560	2006 QR_{35}	—	August 17, 2006	Palomar	NEAT	H	550 m	MPC · JPL
402561	2006 QP_{54}	—	August 17, 2006	Palomar	NEAT	3:2 · SHU	5.9 km	MPC · JPL
402562	2006 QO_{60}	—	August 20, 2006	Palomar	NEAT	·	1.2 km	MPC · JPL
402563	2006 QW_{61}	—	August 22, 2006	Palomar	NEAT	·	1.1 km	MPC · JPL
402564	2006 QA_{123}	—	August 29, 2006	Catalina	CSS	·	1.1 km	MPC · JPL
402565	2006 RV_{4}	—	September 12, 2006	Catalina	CSS	·	2.5 km	MPC · JPL
402566	2006 RK_{7}	—	September 11, 2006	Catalina	CSS	·	1.1 km	MPC · JPL
402567	2006 RB_{11}	—	September 12, 2006	Catalina	CSS	·	1.4 km	MPC · JPL
402568	2006 RN_{25}	—	September 14, 2006	Kitt Peak	Spacewatch	·	660 m	MPC · JPL
402569	2006 RG_{26}	—	September 14, 2006	Catalina	CSS	·	1.0 km	MPC · JPL
402570	2006 RV_{33}	—	September 12, 2006	Catalina	CSS	MAR	1.1 km	MPC · JPL
402571	2006 RK_{35}	—	September 14, 2006	Catalina	CSS	·	2.1 km	MPC · JPL
402572	2006 RB_{47}	—	September 14, 2006	Kitt Peak	Spacewatch	·	900 m	MPC · JPL
402573	2006 RB_{52}	—	September 14, 2006	Kitt Peak	Spacewatch	GEF	1.2 km	MPC · JPL
402574	2006 RC_{53}	—	September 14, 2006	Kitt Peak	Spacewatch	·	1.2 km	MPC · JPL
402575	2006 RH_{53}	—	September 14, 2006	Kitt Peak	Spacewatch	·	1.9 km	MPC · JPL
402576	2006 RC_{54}	—	September 14, 2006	Kitt Peak	Spacewatch	·	1.3 km	MPC · JPL
402577	2006 RQ_{57}	—	September 15, 2006	Kitt Peak	Spacewatch	·	1.6 km	MPC · JPL
402578	2006 RX_{68}	—	September 15, 2006	Kitt Peak	Spacewatch	·	1.6 km	MPC · JPL
402579	2006 RO_{85}	—	September 15, 2006	Kitt Peak	Spacewatch	·	1.2 km	MPC · JPL
402580	2006 RA_{86}	—	September 15, 2006	Kitt Peak	Spacewatch	·	1.0 km	MPC · JPL
402581	2006 RX_{91}	—	September 15, 2006	Kitt Peak	Spacewatch	fast?	1.3 km	MPC · JPL
402582	2006 RF_{94}	—	September 15, 2006	Kitt Peak	Spacewatch	·	1.0 km	MPC · JPL
402583	2006 RG_{97}	—	September 15, 2006	Kitt Peak	Spacewatch	·	960 m	MPC · JPL
402584	2006 RJ_{100}	—	September 14, 2006	Catalina	CSS	·	1.2 km	MPC · JPL
402585	2006 RE_{102}	—	September 15, 2006	Kitt Peak	Spacewatch	·	2.1 km	MPC · JPL
402586	2006 SE_{22}	—	September 17, 2006	Catalina	CSS	KON	2.3 km	MPC · JPL
402587	2006 SQ_{28}	—	August 29, 2006	Kitt Peak	Spacewatch	·	1.4 km	MPC · JPL
402588	2006 SY_{28}	—	September 17, 2006	Kitt Peak	Spacewatch	·	960 m	MPC · JPL
402589	2006 SQ_{43}	—	September 16, 2006	Catalina	CSS	(5)	890 m	MPC · JPL
402590	2006 SB_{52}	—	September 18, 2006	Catalina	CSS	·	870 m	MPC · JPL
402591	2006 SP_{77}	—	September 23, 2006	Wildberg	R. Apitzsch	·	1.6 km	MPC · JPL
402592	2006 SC_{91}	—	September 18, 2006	Kitt Peak	Spacewatch	·	1.1 km	MPC · JPL
402593	2006 SN_{92}	—	September 18, 2006	Kitt Peak	Spacewatch	·	1.2 km	MPC · JPL
402594	2006 SO_{96}	—	September 18, 2006	Kitt Peak	Spacewatch	·	1.7 km	MPC · JPL
402595	2006 SV_{97}	—	September 18, 2006	Kitt Peak	Spacewatch	·	950 m	MPC · JPL
402596	2006 SN_{105}	—	September 19, 2006	Kitt Peak	Spacewatch	(5)	1.1 km	MPC · JPL
402597	2006 SQ_{129}	—	September 19, 2006	Anderson Mesa	LONEOS	KON	2.1 km	MPC · JPL
402598	2006 SV_{146}	—	September 19, 2006	Kitt Peak	Spacewatch	·	1.1 km	MPC · JPL
402599	2006 SP_{150}	—	September 19, 2006	Kitt Peak	Spacewatch	·	1.3 km	MPC · JPL
402600	2006 SV_{151}	—	September 19, 2006	Kitt Peak	Spacewatch	·	1.5 km	MPC · JPL

== 402601–402700 ==
back to top

Designation			Discovery			Properties		Ref
Permanent	Provisional	Named after	Date	Site	Discoverer(s)	Category	Diam.	Ref
402601	2006 SB_{154}	—	September 20, 2006	Anderson Mesa	LONEOS	·	1.3 km	MPC · JPL
402602	2006 SK_{158}	—	September 23, 2006	Kitt Peak	Spacewatch	·	890 m	MPC · JPL
402603	2006 SU_{160}	—	September 23, 2006	Kitt Peak	Spacewatch	·	1.2 km	MPC · JPL
402604	2006 SG_{168}	—	September 25, 2006	Kitt Peak	Spacewatch	·	2.1 km	MPC · JPL
402605	2006 SU_{176}	—	September 25, 2006	Kitt Peak	Spacewatch	·	1.2 km	MPC · JPL
402606	2006 SC_{188}	—	September 26, 2006	Kitt Peak	Spacewatch	·	1.1 km	MPC · JPL
402607	2006 SJ_{188}	—	September 26, 2006	Kitt Peak	Spacewatch	BRG	1.5 km	MPC · JPL
402608	2006 SE_{214}	—	September 27, 2006	Mount Lemmon	Mount Lemmon Survey	·	1.4 km	MPC · JPL
402609	2006 SB_{218}	—	September 21, 2006	Wildberg	R. Apitzsch	·	1.1 km	MPC · JPL
402610	2006 SL_{236}	—	September 26, 2006	Mount Lemmon	Mount Lemmon Survey	·	970 m	MPC · JPL
402611	2006 SD_{249}	—	September 26, 2006	Kitt Peak	Spacewatch	·	1.2 km	MPC · JPL
402612	2006 SY_{259}	—	September 19, 2006	Kitt Peak	Spacewatch	·	1.5 km	MPC · JPL
402613	2006 SN_{273}	—	September 27, 2006	Mount Lemmon	Mount Lemmon Survey	(5)	1.5 km	MPC · JPL
402614	2006 SB_{280}	—	September 29, 2006	Anderson Mesa	LONEOS	(5)	1.1 km	MPC · JPL
402615	2006 SC_{296}	—	September 17, 2006	Kitt Peak	Spacewatch	·	1.4 km	MPC · JPL
402616	2006 SV_{313}	—	September 27, 2006	Kitt Peak	Spacewatch	·	1.2 km	MPC · JPL
402617	2006 SA_{318}	—	September 27, 2006	Kitt Peak	Spacewatch	(5)	710 m	MPC · JPL
402618	2006 SL_{318}	—	September 27, 2006	Kitt Peak	Spacewatch	·	1.4 km	MPC · JPL
402619	2006 SC_{337}	—	September 28, 2006	Kitt Peak	Spacewatch	·	1.3 km	MPC · JPL
402620	2006 SJ_{346}	—	September 28, 2006	Kitt Peak	Spacewatch	·	1.4 km	MPC · JPL
402621	2006 SE_{363}	—	September 30, 2006	Catalina	CSS	·	1.3 km	MPC · JPL
402622	2006 SK_{391}	—	September 18, 2006	Kitt Peak	Spacewatch	·	1.2 km	MPC · JPL
402623	2006 SW_{398}	—	September 17, 2006	Kitt Peak	Spacewatch	·	970 m	MPC · JPL
402624	2006 SK_{401}	—	September 28, 2006	Mount Lemmon	Mount Lemmon Survey	·	1.4 km	MPC · JPL
402625	2006 TO_{17}	—	October 11, 2006	Kitt Peak	Spacewatch	·	1.0 km	MPC · JPL
402626	2006 TT_{18}	—	October 11, 2006	Kitt Peak	Spacewatch	·	1.4 km	MPC · JPL
402627	2006 TK_{32}	—	October 12, 2006	Kitt Peak	Spacewatch	·	1.1 km	MPC · JPL
402628	2006 TC_{41}	—	October 12, 2006	Kitt Peak	Spacewatch	·	1.2 km	MPC · JPL
402629	2006 TH_{43}	—	September 25, 2006	Mount Lemmon	Mount Lemmon Survey	·	1.1 km	MPC · JPL
402630	2006 TW_{44}	—	October 12, 2006	Kitt Peak	Spacewatch	·	1.4 km	MPC · JPL
402631	2006 TB_{50}	—	October 12, 2006	Palomar	NEAT	·	1.1 km	MPC · JPL
402632	2006 TL_{50}	—	September 25, 2006	Mount Lemmon	Mount Lemmon Survey	·	1.1 km	MPC · JPL
402633	2006 TH_{59}	—	October 13, 2006	Kitt Peak	Spacewatch	·	1.3 km	MPC · JPL
402634	2006 TD_{60}	—	October 13, 2006	Kitt Peak	Spacewatch	·	1.8 km	MPC · JPL
402635	2006 TQ_{78}	—	October 12, 2006	Kitt Peak	Spacewatch	·	1.5 km	MPC · JPL
402636	2006 TS_{99}	—	October 15, 2006	Kitt Peak	Spacewatch	·	950 m	MPC · JPL
402637	2006 TC_{105}	—	September 30, 2006	Mount Lemmon	Mount Lemmon Survey	WIT	1.0 km	MPC · JPL
402638	2006 TQ_{113}	—	October 1, 2006	Apache Point	A. C. Becker	·	2.4 km	MPC · JPL
402639	2006 TD_{118}	—	October 3, 2006	Apache Point	A. C. Becker	·	1.5 km	MPC · JPL
402640	2006 TF_{118}	—	October 3, 2006	Apache Point	A. C. Becker	·	2.8 km	MPC · JPL
402641	2006 TV_{119}	—	October 11, 2006	Apache Point	A. C. Becker	·	3.5 km	MPC · JPL
402642	2006 TR_{124}	—	October 3, 2006	Mount Lemmon	Mount Lemmon Survey	·	2.0 km	MPC · JPL
402643	2006 TD_{127}	—	October 4, 2006	Mount Lemmon	Mount Lemmon Survey	·	1.1 km	MPC · JPL
402644	2006 TJ_{127}	—	October 4, 2006	Mount Lemmon	Mount Lemmon Survey	·	1.8 km	MPC · JPL
402645	2006 US_{6}	—	October 16, 2006	Catalina	CSS	·	1.4 km	MPC · JPL
402646	2006 UN_{12}	—	October 17, 2006	Mount Lemmon	Mount Lemmon Survey	·	2.3 km	MPC · JPL
402647	2006 UJ_{17}	—	October 19, 2006	Calvin-Rehoboth	L. A. Molnar	·	1.1 km	MPC · JPL
402648	2006 UO_{24}	—	September 25, 2006	Kitt Peak	Spacewatch	·	1.2 km	MPC · JPL
402649	2006 UR_{39}	—	October 16, 2006	Kitt Peak	Spacewatch	·	1.1 km	MPC · JPL
402650	2006 UL_{46}	—	October 16, 2006	Kitt Peak	Spacewatch	·	1.3 km	MPC · JPL
402651	2006 UE_{55}	—	October 17, 2006	Kitt Peak	Spacewatch	·	1.2 km	MPC · JPL
402652	2006 UG_{71}	—	October 16, 2006	Kitt Peak	Spacewatch	MIS	2.0 km	MPC · JPL
402653	2006 UU_{77}	—	September 28, 2006	Mount Lemmon	Mount Lemmon Survey	·	1.2 km	MPC · JPL
402654	2006 UA_{83}	—	October 17, 2006	Kitt Peak	Spacewatch	·	1.9 km	MPC · JPL
402655	2006 UQ_{86}	—	October 17, 2006	Mount Lemmon	Mount Lemmon Survey	NEM	2.2 km	MPC · JPL
402656	2006 UC_{87}	—	October 17, 2006	Mount Lemmon	Mount Lemmon Survey	·	1.5 km	MPC · JPL
402657	2006 UK_{94}	—	October 18, 2006	Kitt Peak	Spacewatch	·	1.4 km	MPC · JPL
402658	2006 UR_{96}	—	October 2, 2006	Mount Lemmon	Mount Lemmon Survey	·	1.5 km	MPC · JPL
402659	2006 UC_{99}	—	October 18, 2006	Kitt Peak	Spacewatch	(7744)	1.7 km	MPC · JPL
402660	2006 UH_{104}	—	October 18, 2006	Kitt Peak	Spacewatch	·	1.4 km	MPC · JPL
402661	2006 US_{119}	—	October 19, 2006	Kitt Peak	Spacewatch	·	1.7 km	MPC · JPL
402662	2006 UH_{154}	—	October 21, 2006	Catalina	CSS	·	1.0 km	MPC · JPL
402663	2006 UK_{164}	—	October 21, 2006	Mount Lemmon	Mount Lemmon Survey	·	1.6 km	MPC · JPL
402664	2006 UU_{171}	—	October 21, 2006	Mount Lemmon	Mount Lemmon Survey	·	1.4 km	MPC · JPL
402665	2006 UZ_{177}	—	October 16, 2006	Catalina	CSS	·	1.3 km	MPC · JPL
402666	2006 UL_{192}	—	October 19, 2006	Catalina	CSS	·	1.2 km	MPC · JPL
402667	2006 UB_{193}	—	October 19, 2006	Palomar	NEAT	·	1.4 km	MPC · JPL
402668	2006 UJ_{199}	—	October 20, 2006	Kitt Peak	Spacewatch	·	2.0 km	MPC · JPL
402669	2006 UM_{212}	—	October 23, 2006	Kitt Peak	Spacewatch	·	1.8 km	MPC · JPL
402670	2006 UX_{221}	—	October 17, 2006	Catalina	CSS	(5)	950 m	MPC · JPL
402671	2006 UN_{238}	—	October 23, 2006	Palomar	NEAT	(194)	1.9 km	MPC · JPL
402672	2006 UK_{241}	—	October 23, 2006	Catalina	CSS	·	2.6 km	MPC · JPL
402673	2006 UQ_{265}	—	October 27, 2006	Catalina	CSS	·	1.6 km	MPC · JPL
402674	2006 UJ_{273}	—	October 27, 2006	Kitt Peak	Spacewatch	GEF ·	3.0 km	MPC · JPL
402675	2006 UV_{279}	—	October 28, 2006	Mount Lemmon	Mount Lemmon Survey	AST	1.4 km	MPC · JPL
402676	2006 UN_{282}	—	October 20, 2006	Kitt Peak	Spacewatch	·	1.0 km	MPC · JPL
402677	2006 UV_{285}	—	October 28, 2006	Kitt Peak	Spacewatch	·	1.4 km	MPC · JPL
402678	2006 UF_{286}	—	October 28, 2006	Kitt Peak	Spacewatch	·	1.5 km	MPC · JPL
402679	2006 UH_{335}	—	October 16, 2006	Kitt Peak	Spacewatch	·	1.4 km	MPC · JPL
402680	2006 UE_{336}	—	October 20, 2006	Kitt Peak	Spacewatch	MIS	2.3 km	MPC · JPL
402681	2006 UM_{336}	—	October 21, 2006	Catalina	CSS	·	2.6 km	MPC · JPL
402682	2006 UD_{338}	—	October 23, 2006	Mount Lemmon	Mount Lemmon Survey	·	1.4 km	MPC · JPL
402683	2006 UF_{346}	—	October 19, 2006	Catalina	CSS	·	2.4 km	MPC · JPL
402684	2006 UH_{361}	—	October 19, 2006	Catalina	CSS	·	1.2 km	MPC · JPL
402685	2006 VH_{2}	—	November 9, 2006	Dax	Dax	(5)	1.1 km	MPC · JPL
402686	2006 VO_{10}	—	November 11, 2006	Catalina	CSS	·	1.1 km	MPC · JPL
402687	2006 VO_{11}	—	November 11, 2006	Mount Lemmon	Mount Lemmon Survey	·	1.4 km	MPC · JPL
402688	2006 VW_{22}	—	November 10, 2006	Kitt Peak	Spacewatch	·	1.3 km	MPC · JPL
402689	2006 VA_{27}	—	October 27, 2006	Mount Lemmon	Mount Lemmon Survey	·	1.5 km	MPC · JPL
402690	2006 VB_{37}	—	November 11, 2006	Catalina	CSS	·	940 m	MPC · JPL
402691	2006 VS_{40}	—	November 12, 2006	Mount Lemmon	Mount Lemmon Survey	·	1.0 km	MPC · JPL
402692	2006 VN_{46}	—	October 31, 2006	Mount Lemmon	Mount Lemmon Survey	·	2.0 km	MPC · JPL
402693	2006 VQ_{48}	—	November 10, 2006	Socorro	LINEAR	·	1.6 km	MPC · JPL
402694	2006 VG_{51}	—	November 10, 2006	Kitt Peak	Spacewatch	·	1.4 km	MPC · JPL
402695	2006 VU_{52}	—	November 11, 2006	Kitt Peak	Spacewatch	·	1.4 km	MPC · JPL
402696	2006 VU_{64}	—	September 28, 2006	Mount Lemmon	Mount Lemmon Survey	·	1.5 km	MPC · JPL
402697	2006 VB_{65}	—	October 28, 2006	Mount Lemmon	Mount Lemmon Survey	NYS	860 m	MPC · JPL
402698	2006 VC_{65}	—	November 11, 2006	Kitt Peak	Spacewatch	·	1.9 km	MPC · JPL
402699	2006 VD_{68}	—	November 11, 2006	Kitt Peak	Spacewatch	·	1.3 km	MPC · JPL
402700	2006 VY_{81}	—	November 13, 2006	Kitt Peak	Spacewatch	·	1.4 km	MPC · JPL

== 402701–402800 ==
back to top

Designation			Discovery			Properties		Ref
Permanent	Provisional	Named after	Date	Site	Discoverer(s)	Category	Diam.	Ref
402701	2006 VK_{87}	—	November 14, 2006	Catalina	CSS	·	1.4 km	MPC · JPL
402702	2006 VB_{90}	—	September 27, 2006	Mount Lemmon	Mount Lemmon Survey	(5)	1.3 km	MPC · JPL
402703	2006 VO_{98}	—	November 11, 2006	Catalina	CSS	·	1.0 km	MPC · JPL
402704	2006 VH_{104}	—	November 13, 2006	Catalina	CSS	·	1.2 km	MPC · JPL
402705	2006 VD_{110}	—	November 13, 2006	Kitt Peak	Spacewatch	(5)	1.4 km	MPC · JPL
402706	2006 VT_{112}	—	November 13, 2006	Kitt Peak	Spacewatch	EUN	2.3 km	MPC · JPL
402707	2006 VG_{121}	—	November 2, 2006	Catalina	CSS	MAR	1.3 km	MPC · JPL
402708	2006 VG_{128}	—	November 15, 2006	Kitt Peak	Spacewatch	·	1.9 km	MPC · JPL
402709	2006 VW_{129}	—	September 27, 2006	Mount Lemmon	Mount Lemmon Survey	·	1.7 km	MPC · JPL
402710	2006 VF_{147}	—	November 15, 2006	Mount Lemmon	Mount Lemmon Survey	PAD	1.5 km	MPC · JPL
402711	2006 VG_{149}	—	September 19, 2006	Catalina	CSS	·	1.4 km	MPC · JPL
402712	2006 VO_{150}	—	November 9, 2006	Palomar	NEAT	·	1.2 km	MPC · JPL
402713	2006 VO_{156}	—	November 13, 2006	Apache Point	SDSS	·	1.4 km	MPC · JPL
402714	2006 WH_{7}	—	November 16, 2006	Kitt Peak	Spacewatch	·	2.9 km	MPC · JPL
402715	2006 WF_{12}	—	November 16, 2006	Mount Lemmon	Mount Lemmon Survey	·	1.6 km	MPC · JPL
402716	2006 WW_{17}	—	November 1, 2006	Mount Lemmon	Mount Lemmon Survey	·	1.6 km	MPC · JPL
402717	2006 WQ_{20}	—	November 17, 2006	Mount Lemmon	Mount Lemmon Survey	·	1.5 km	MPC · JPL
402718	2006 WT_{33}	—	September 30, 2006	Mount Lemmon	Mount Lemmon Survey	·	1.4 km	MPC · JPL
402719	2006 WO_{36}	—	November 16, 2006	Kitt Peak	Spacewatch	·	1.5 km	MPC · JPL
402720	2006 WK_{42}	—	November 16, 2006	Kitt Peak	Spacewatch	·	1.3 km	MPC · JPL
402721	2006 WP_{48}	—	November 16, 2006	Kitt Peak	Spacewatch	·	2.0 km	MPC · JPL
402722	2006 WY_{55}	—	November 16, 2006	Mount Lemmon	Mount Lemmon Survey	·	2.2 km	MPC · JPL
402723	2006 WR_{56}	—	November 16, 2006	Kitt Peak	Spacewatch	·	1.5 km	MPC · JPL
402724	2006 WR_{67}	—	November 17, 2006	Kitt Peak	Spacewatch	EUN	1.6 km	MPC · JPL
402725	2006 WN_{70}	—	October 31, 2006	Mount Lemmon	Mount Lemmon Survey	·	1.9 km	MPC · JPL
402726	2006 WR_{86}	—	November 18, 2006	Socorro	LINEAR	·	2.0 km	MPC · JPL
402727	2006 WS_{110}	—	November 11, 2006	Kitt Peak	Spacewatch	·	1.7 km	MPC · JPL
402728	2006 WO_{123}	—	November 21, 2006	Mount Lemmon	Mount Lemmon Survey	·	2.5 km	MPC · JPL
402729	2006 WE_{125}	—	November 22, 2006	Kitt Peak	Spacewatch	HOF	2.6 km	MPC · JPL
402730	2006 WE_{133}	—	November 18, 2006	Kitt Peak	Spacewatch	·	1.1 km	MPC · JPL
402731	2006 WS_{137}	—	November 19, 2006	Kitt Peak	Spacewatch	·	1.8 km	MPC · JPL
402732	2006 WY_{154}	—	November 22, 2006	Kitt Peak	Spacewatch	HOF	2.4 km	MPC · JPL
402733	2006 WJ_{158}	—	November 22, 2006	Kitt Peak	Spacewatch	·	1.7 km	MPC · JPL
402734	2006 WR_{158}	—	November 22, 2006	Socorro	LINEAR	·	1.4 km	MPC · JPL
402735	2006 WV_{163}	—	October 23, 2006	Mount Lemmon	Mount Lemmon Survey	GEF	1.2 km	MPC · JPL
402736	2006 WN_{169}	—	March 23, 2004	Kitt Peak	Spacewatch	AST	1.7 km	MPC · JPL
402737	2006 WX_{169}	—	November 23, 2006	Kitt Peak	Spacewatch	·	2.6 km	MPC · JPL
402738	2006 WH_{177}	—	November 23, 2006	Mount Lemmon	Mount Lemmon Survey	·	1.6 km	MPC · JPL
402739	2006 WH_{201}	—	November 20, 2006	Kitt Peak	Spacewatch	ADE	2.5 km	MPC · JPL
402740	2006 WX_{201}	—	November 24, 2006	Mount Lemmon	Mount Lemmon Survey	·	2.3 km	MPC · JPL
402741	2006 XL	—	December 9, 2006	7300	W. K. Y. Yeung	·	2.6 km	MPC · JPL
402742	2006 XG_{6}	—	December 8, 2006	Palomar	NEAT	·	1.5 km	MPC · JPL
402743	2006 XQ_{13}	—	December 10, 2006	Kitt Peak	Spacewatch	·	1.4 km	MPC · JPL
402744	2006 XD_{16}	—	December 10, 2006	Anderson Mesa	LONEOS	·	1.3 km	MPC · JPL
402745	2006 XQ_{26}	—	December 12, 2006	Catalina	CSS	ADE	2.3 km	MPC · JPL
402746	2006 XA_{32}	—	December 9, 2006	Kitt Peak	Spacewatch	AGN	990 m	MPC · JPL
402747	2006 XF_{32}	—	December 9, 2006	Kitt Peak	Spacewatch	·	1.8 km	MPC · JPL
402748	2006 XA_{38}	—	December 11, 2006	Kitt Peak	Spacewatch	·	2.0 km	MPC · JPL
402749	2006 XZ_{46}	—	December 13, 2006	Catalina	CSS	·	1.5 km	MPC · JPL
402750	2006 XL_{73}	—	December 15, 2006	Kitt Peak	Spacewatch	·	2.0 km	MPC · JPL
402751	2006 YW_{11}	—	December 18, 2006	Mount Nyukasa	Japan Aerospace Exploration Agency	·	1.6 km	MPC · JPL
402752	2006 YM_{12}	—	December 14, 2006	Mount Lemmon	Mount Lemmon Survey	·	2.9 km	MPC · JPL
402753	2006 YQ_{14}	—	December 25, 2006	Junk Bond	D. Healy	·	1.6 km	MPC · JPL
402754	2006 YW_{18}	—	December 23, 2006	Mount Lemmon	Mount Lemmon Survey	·	2.9 km	MPC · JPL
402755	2006 YK_{21}	—	December 21, 2006	Kitt Peak	Spacewatch	·	1.3 km	MPC · JPL
402756	2006 YC_{34}	—	December 21, 2006	Kitt Peak	Spacewatch	·	1.4 km	MPC · JPL
402757	2006 YV_{48}	—	December 25, 2006	Kitt Peak	Spacewatch	·	4.0 km	MPC · JPL
402758	2007 AT_{8}	—	January 10, 2007	Mount Nyukasa	Japan Aerospace Exploration Agency	·	3.2 km	MPC · JPL
402759	2007 AK_{14}	—	January 9, 2007	Mount Lemmon	Mount Lemmon Survey	·	1.9 km	MPC · JPL
402760	2007 AN_{17}	—	December 14, 2006	Mount Lemmon	Mount Lemmon Survey	DOR	2.5 km	MPC · JPL
402761	2007 AL_{31}	—	January 15, 2007	Catalina	CSS	·	2.0 km	MPC · JPL
402762	2007 BF_{14}	—	January 17, 2007	Kitt Peak	Spacewatch	EOS	2.0 km	MPC · JPL
402763	2007 BO_{25}	—	January 17, 2007	Kitt Peak	Spacewatch	GEF	1.1 km	MPC · JPL
402764	2007 BW_{29}	—	January 24, 2007	Socorro	LINEAR	·	3.2 km	MPC · JPL
402765	2007 BA_{33}	—	December 20, 2006	Mount Lemmon	Mount Lemmon Survey	·	2.1 km	MPC · JPL
402766	2007 BL_{41}	—	November 23, 2006	Mount Lemmon	Mount Lemmon Survey	EOS	1.8 km	MPC · JPL
402767	2007 BF_{47}	—	January 26, 2007	Kitt Peak	Spacewatch	·	1.9 km	MPC · JPL
402768	2007 BS_{49}	—	September 24, 2005	Kitt Peak	Spacewatch	AGN	1.3 km	MPC · JPL
402769	2007 BA_{52}	—	January 24, 2007	Kitt Peak	Spacewatch	ARM	4.1 km	MPC · JPL
402770	2007 BS_{76}	—	January 9, 2007	Kitt Peak	Spacewatch	·	2.2 km	MPC · JPL
402771	2007 BN_{77}	—	January 17, 2007	Kitt Peak	Spacewatch	·	2.0 km	MPC · JPL
402772	2007 BL_{78}	—	January 25, 2007	Kitt Peak	Spacewatch	·	2.8 km	MPC · JPL
402773	2007 BO_{78}	—	January 25, 2007	Kitt Peak	Spacewatch	·	2.0 km	MPC · JPL
402774	2007 BK_{81}	—	January 27, 2007	Kitt Peak	Spacewatch	·	2.7 km	MPC · JPL
402775	2007 CH_{3}	—	February 6, 2007	Kitt Peak	Spacewatch	·	1.8 km	MPC · JPL
402776	2007 CR_{4}	—	January 27, 2007	Kitt Peak	Spacewatch	·	590 m	MPC · JPL
402777	2007 CB_{15}	—	January 27, 2007	Mount Lemmon	Mount Lemmon Survey	·	2.2 km	MPC · JPL
402778	2007 CD_{21}	—	January 27, 2007	Mount Lemmon	Mount Lemmon Survey	·	2.0 km	MPC · JPL
402779	2007 CB_{30}	—	February 6, 2007	Mount Lemmon	Mount Lemmon Survey	·	1.8 km	MPC · JPL
402780	2007 CR_{31}	—	January 27, 2007	Kitt Peak	Spacewatch	EOS	1.9 km	MPC · JPL
402781	2007 CA_{35}	—	February 6, 2007	Mount Lemmon	Mount Lemmon Survey	·	1.6 km	MPC · JPL
402782	2007 CH_{37}	—	February 6, 2007	Mount Lemmon	Mount Lemmon Survey	·	2.0 km	MPC · JPL
402783	2007 CS_{47}	—	January 27, 2007	Mount Lemmon	Mount Lemmon Survey	·	2.5 km	MPC · JPL
402784	2007 CD_{50}	—	February 12, 2007	Vail-Jarnac	Jarnac	·	1.9 km	MPC · JPL
402785	2007 DZ_{2}	—	February 8, 2007	Kitt Peak	Spacewatch	EUP	4.4 km	MPC · JPL
402786	2007 DK_{5}	—	February 17, 2007	Kitt Peak	Spacewatch	·	2.0 km	MPC · JPL
402787	2007 DA_{18}	—	February 17, 2007	Kitt Peak	Spacewatch	·	1.9 km	MPC · JPL
402788	2007 DO_{24}	—	February 17, 2007	Kitt Peak	Spacewatch	EOS	1.4 km	MPC · JPL
402789	2007 DW_{29}	—	February 17, 2007	Kitt Peak	Spacewatch	·	3.5 km	MPC · JPL
402790	2007 DE_{32}	—	February 17, 2007	Kitt Peak	Spacewatch	·	2.8 km	MPC · JPL
402791	2007 DK_{32}	—	February 17, 2007	Kitt Peak	Spacewatch	·	2.4 km	MPC · JPL
402792	2007 DV_{34}	—	February 17, 2007	Kitt Peak	Spacewatch	·	2.9 km	MPC · JPL
402793	2007 DO_{40}	—	February 19, 2007	Mount Lemmon	Mount Lemmon Survey	·	3.6 km	MPC · JPL
402794	2007 DL_{50}	—	January 10, 2007	Mount Lemmon	Mount Lemmon Survey	EOS	1.8 km	MPC · JPL
402795	2007 DO_{51}	—	February 17, 2007	Kitt Peak	Spacewatch	VER	3.1 km	MPC · JPL
402796	2007 DQ_{51}	—	February 17, 2007	Kitt Peak	Spacewatch	EUP	4.2 km	MPC · JPL
402797	2007 DN_{54}	—	February 21, 2007	Kitt Peak	Spacewatch	·	2.3 km	MPC · JPL
402798	2007 DJ_{61}	—	February 19, 2007	Catalina	CSS	·	3.7 km	MPC · JPL
402799	2007 DZ_{61}	—	December 27, 2006	Mount Lemmon	Mount Lemmon Survey	·	2.1 km	MPC · JPL
402800	2007 DY_{62}	—	February 21, 2007	Kitt Peak	Spacewatch	·	2.2 km	MPC · JPL

== 402801–402900 ==
back to top

Designation			Discovery			Properties		Ref
Permanent	Provisional	Named after	Date	Site	Discoverer(s)	Category	Diam.	Ref
402801	2007 DD_{68}	—	February 21, 2007	Kitt Peak	Spacewatch	·	1 km	MPC · JPL
402802	2007 DN_{68}	—	February 21, 2007	Kitt Peak	Spacewatch	·	2.0 km	MPC · JPL
402803	2007 DD_{72}	—	February 21, 2007	Kitt Peak	Spacewatch	·	2.6 km	MPC · JPL
402804	2007 DJ_{72}	—	February 21, 2007	Kitt Peak	Spacewatch	KOR	1.4 km	MPC · JPL
402805	2007 DS_{73}	—	February 21, 2007	Kitt Peak	Spacewatch	THM	1.8 km	MPC · JPL
402806	2007 DS_{76}	—	February 22, 2007	Anderson Mesa	LONEOS	·	1.8 km	MPC · JPL
402807	2007 DQ_{84}	—	January 27, 2007	Mount Lemmon	Mount Lemmon Survey	·	1.5 km	MPC · JPL
402808	2007 DD_{89}	—	January 28, 2007	Mount Lemmon	Mount Lemmon Survey	TIR	3.2 km	MPC · JPL
402809	2007 DG_{91}	—	February 23, 2007	Mount Lemmon	Mount Lemmon Survey	·	1.8 km	MPC · JPL
402810	2007 DO_{98}	—	January 28, 2007	Mount Lemmon	Mount Lemmon Survey	·	540 m	MPC · JPL
402811	2007 DE_{109}	—	February 17, 2007	Kitt Peak	Spacewatch	EOS	2.2 km	MPC · JPL
402812	2007 DP_{114}	—	February 26, 2007	Mount Lemmon	Mount Lemmon Survey	·	2.4 km	MPC · JPL
402813	2007 DL_{117}	—	February 25, 2007	Mount Lemmon	Mount Lemmon Survey	THM	2.5 km	MPC · JPL
402814	2007 EW_{1}	—	March 9, 2007	Kitt Peak	Spacewatch	·	3.9 km	MPC · JPL
402815	2007 EL_{33}	—	February 22, 2007	Kitt Peak	Spacewatch	·	1.8 km	MPC · JPL
402816	2007 EJ_{47}	—	March 9, 2007	Kitt Peak	Spacewatch	·	650 m	MPC · JPL
402817	2007 EZ_{62}	—	March 10, 2007	Kitt Peak	Spacewatch	EOS	1.8 km	MPC · JPL
402818	2007 EJ_{63}	—	March 10, 2007	Kitt Peak	Spacewatch	·	1.9 km	MPC · JPL
402819	2007 EJ_{72}	—	February 25, 2007	Mount Lemmon	Mount Lemmon Survey	EOS	2.1 km	MPC · JPL
402820	2007 EX_{98}	—	February 26, 2007	Mount Lemmon	Mount Lemmon Survey	·	1.9 km	MPC · JPL
402821	2007 EK_{115}	—	March 13, 2007	Mount Lemmon	Mount Lemmon Survey	·	3.8 km	MPC · JPL
402822	2007 EL_{133}	—	March 9, 2007	Mount Lemmon	Mount Lemmon Survey	·	570 m	MPC · JPL
402823	2007 EF_{146}	—	February 26, 2007	Mount Lemmon	Mount Lemmon Survey	·	2.7 km	MPC · JPL
402824	2007 EL_{156}	—	March 12, 2007	Kitt Peak	Spacewatch	·	770 m	MPC · JPL
402825	2007 EV_{160}	—	December 26, 2006	Kitt Peak	Spacewatch	EOS	3.0 km	MPC · JPL
402826	2007 EJ_{186}	—	February 27, 2007	Kitt Peak	Spacewatch	HYG	2.3 km	MPC · JPL
402827	2007 EW_{215}	—	November 24, 2006	Mount Lemmon	Mount Lemmon Survey	·	3.0 km	MPC · JPL
402828	2007 EJ_{220}	—	March 13, 2007	Mount Lemmon	Mount Lemmon Survey	EMA	3.6 km	MPC · JPL
402829	2007 FP_{10}	—	January 7, 2006	Mount Lemmon	Mount Lemmon Survey	·	2.4 km	MPC · JPL
402830	2007 FJ_{21}	—	March 20, 2007	Mount Lemmon	Mount Lemmon Survey	EOS	1.8 km	MPC · JPL
402831	2007 FM_{30}	—	March 13, 2007	Kitt Peak	Spacewatch	·	2.2 km	MPC · JPL
402832	2007 FJ_{39}	—	March 16, 2007	Mount Lemmon	Mount Lemmon Survey	EOS	2.5 km	MPC · JPL
402833	2007 FB_{45}	—	March 16, 2007	Mount Lemmon	Mount Lemmon Survey	·	2.8 km	MPC · JPL
402834	2007 GQ_{11}	—	March 11, 2007	Kitt Peak	Spacewatch	·	650 m	MPC · JPL
402835	2007 GX_{27}	—	March 26, 2007	Catalina	CSS	THB	3.1 km	MPC · JPL
402836	2007 GW_{31}	—	April 15, 2007	Catalina	CSS	URS	4.1 km	MPC · JPL
402837	2007 HM_{12}	—	March 26, 2007	Kitt Peak	Spacewatch	·	720 m	MPC · JPL
402838	2007 HY_{24}	—	April 18, 2007	Kitt Peak	Spacewatch	·	510 m	MPC · JPL
402839	2007 HR_{72}	—	March 14, 2007	Kitt Peak	Spacewatch	·	2.0 km	MPC · JPL
402840	2007 HV_{95}	—	March 26, 2007	Mount Lemmon	Mount Lemmon Survey	·	2.5 km	MPC · JPL
402841 Kamakawiwoʻole	2007 LE_{1}	Kamakawiwoʻole	April 25, 2007	Mount Lemmon	Mount Lemmon Survey	CYB	3.5 km	MPC · JPL
402842	2007 MX_{6}	—	June 18, 2007	Kitt Peak	Spacewatch	·	3.2 km	MPC · JPL
402843	2007 PX	—	August 4, 2007	Reedy Creek	J. Broughton	·	740 m	MPC · JPL
402844	2007 PY_{21}	—	August 9, 2007	Socorro	LINEAR	·	1.1 km	MPC · JPL
402845	2007 PE_{46}	—	August 9, 2007	Kitt Peak	Spacewatch	·	760 m	MPC · JPL
402846	2007 PU_{50}	—	August 8, 2007	Socorro	LINEAR	(2076)	870 m	MPC · JPL
402847	2007 QQ_{7}	—	August 21, 2007	Anderson Mesa	LONEOS	V	760 m	MPC · JPL
402848	2007 QU_{7}	—	August 21, 2007	Anderson Mesa	LONEOS	·	920 m	MPC · JPL
402849	2007 QT_{14}	—	August 24, 2007	Kitt Peak	Spacewatch	·	810 m	MPC · JPL
402850	2007 QV_{16}	—	August 22, 2007	Anderson Mesa	LONEOS	·	2.3 km	MPC · JPL
402851	2007 RE_{11}	—	September 5, 2007	Siding Spring	K. Sárneczky, L. Kiss	·	920 m	MPC · JPL
402852 Picardie	2007 RE_{12}	Picardie	September 9, 2007	Vicques	M. Ory	V	680 m	MPC · JPL
402853	2007 RE_{18}	—	September 12, 2007	Hibiscus	Teamo, N., Pelle, J. C.	V	630 m	MPC · JPL
402854	2007 RD_{36}	—	September 8, 2007	Anderson Mesa	LONEOS	NYS	870 m	MPC · JPL
402855	2007 RY_{46}	—	September 9, 2007	Kitt Peak	Spacewatch	·	1.1 km	MPC · JPL
402856	2007 RM_{83}	—	September 10, 2007	Mount Lemmon	Mount Lemmon Survey	NYS	900 m	MPC · JPL
402857	2007 RT_{91}	—	September 10, 2007	Mount Lemmon	Mount Lemmon Survey	·	900 m	MPC · JPL
402858	2007 RW_{91}	—	September 10, 2007	Mount Lemmon	Mount Lemmon Survey	MAS	780 m	MPC · JPL
402859	2007 RQ_{93}	—	September 10, 2007	Kitt Peak	Spacewatch	·	1.4 km	MPC · JPL
402860	2007 RP_{94}	—	September 10, 2007	Kitt Peak	Spacewatch	·	780 m	MPC · JPL
402861	2007 RP_{96}	—	September 10, 2007	Kitt Peak	Spacewatch	T_{j} (2.99) · 3:2	6.6 km	MPC · JPL
402862	2007 RR_{105}	—	September 11, 2007	Catalina	CSS	T_{j} (2.99) · 3:2 · SHU	6.0 km	MPC · JPL
402863	2007 RW_{126}	—	September 12, 2007	Mount Lemmon	Mount Lemmon Survey	·	1.1 km	MPC · JPL
402864	2007 RM_{136}	—	September 14, 2007	Mount Lemmon	Mount Lemmon Survey	·	890 m	MPC · JPL
402865	2007 RN_{145}	—	September 14, 2007	Socorro	LINEAR	·	1.5 km	MPC · JPL
402866	2007 RF_{149}	—	September 12, 2007	Anderson Mesa	LONEOS	·	760 m	MPC · JPL
402867	2007 RT_{149}	—	September 12, 2007	Catalina	CSS	·	1.0 km	MPC · JPL
402868	2007 RV_{181}	—	September 11, 2007	Mount Lemmon	Mount Lemmon Survey	·	990 m	MPC · JPL
402869	2007 RY_{194}	—	September 12, 2007	Kitt Peak	Spacewatch	3:2	6.6 km	MPC · JPL
402870	2007 RM_{204}	—	September 9, 2007	Kitt Peak	Spacewatch	·	1.1 km	MPC · JPL
402871	2007 RF_{205}	—	September 9, 2007	Kitt Peak	Spacewatch	·	1.1 km	MPC · JPL
402872	2007 RA_{206}	—	September 10, 2007	Mount Lemmon	Mount Lemmon Survey	·	690 m	MPC · JPL
402873	2007 RS_{212}	—	September 12, 2007	Catalina	CSS	NYS	1.1 km	MPC · JPL
402874	2007 RB_{223}	—	September 11, 2007	Mount Lemmon	Mount Lemmon Survey	NYS	1.1 km	MPC · JPL
402875	2007 RQ_{223}	—	September 8, 2007	Mount Lemmon	Mount Lemmon Survey	·	1 km	MPC · JPL
402876	2007 RN_{229}	—	September 11, 2007	Mount Lemmon	Mount Lemmon Survey	NYS	980 m	MPC · JPL
402877	2007 RS_{239}	—	September 14, 2007	Catalina	CSS	·	960 m	MPC · JPL
402878	2007 RN_{248}	—	March 8, 1995	Kitt Peak	Spacewatch	·	1.1 km	MPC · JPL
402879	2007 RV_{259}	—	September 14, 2007	Kitt Peak	Spacewatch	·	1.2 km	MPC · JPL
402880	2007 RM_{261}	—	September 14, 2007	Kitt Peak	Spacewatch	·	1.2 km	MPC · JPL
402881	2007 RV_{268}	—	September 15, 2007	Kitt Peak	Spacewatch	·	1.1 km	MPC · JPL
402882	2007 RA_{297}	—	September 9, 2007	Kitt Peak	Spacewatch	·	1.8 km	MPC · JPL
402883	2007 RC_{299}	—	September 13, 2007	Mount Lemmon	Mount Lemmon Survey	·	1.4 km	MPC · JPL
402884	2007 RE_{302}	—	September 12, 2007	Mount Lemmon	Mount Lemmon Survey	·	1.4 km	MPC · JPL
402885	2007 RQ_{312}	—	September 13, 2007	Mount Lemmon	Mount Lemmon Survey	NYS	1.1 km	MPC · JPL
402886	2007 RD_{320}	—	September 13, 2007	Mount Lemmon	Mount Lemmon Survey	NYS	860 m	MPC · JPL
402887	2007 RW_{320}	—	September 8, 2007	Anderson Mesa	LONEOS	·	1.2 km	MPC · JPL
402888	2007 RT_{322}	—	September 13, 2007	Catalina	CSS	·	750 m	MPC · JPL
402889	2007 RJ_{324}	—	September 15, 2007	Mount Lemmon	Mount Lemmon Survey	·	1.2 km	MPC · JPL
402890	2007 SR_{2}	—	September 19, 2007	Dauban	Chante-Perdrix	·	750 m	MPC · JPL
402891	2007 SF_{3}	—	September 11, 2007	XuYi	PMO NEO Survey Program	·	930 m	MPC · JPL
402892	2007 SG_{3}	—	September 16, 2007	Socorro	LINEAR	·	840 m	MPC · JPL
402893	2007 SQ_{9}	—	September 18, 2007	Kitt Peak	Spacewatch	·	980 m	MPC · JPL
402894	2007 SC_{19}	—	September 26, 2007	Mount Lemmon	Mount Lemmon Survey	V	800 m	MPC · JPL
402895	2007 TD_{5}	—	September 20, 2007	Catalina	CSS	·	830 m	MPC · JPL
402896	2007 TC_{10}	—	October 6, 2007	Socorro	LINEAR	MAS	710 m	MPC · JPL
402897	2007 TW_{11}	—	September 5, 2007	Mount Lemmon	Mount Lemmon Survey	·	730 m	MPC · JPL
402898	2007 TJ_{12}	—	October 6, 2007	Socorro	LINEAR	T_{j} (2.99) · 3:2	4.9 km	MPC · JPL
402899	2007 TE_{17}	—	October 7, 2007	Calvin-Rehoboth	Calvin College	·	1.0 km	MPC · JPL
402900	2007 TL_{20}	—	September 14, 2007	Mount Lemmon	Mount Lemmon Survey	·	1.1 km	MPC · JPL

== 402901–403000 ==
back to top

Designation			Discovery			Properties		Ref
Permanent	Provisional	Named after	Date	Site	Discoverer(s)	Category	Diam.	Ref
402901	2007 TF_{36}	—	September 4, 2007	Catalina	CSS	PHO	1.9 km	MPC · JPL
402902	2007 TG_{38}	—	October 4, 2007	Catalina	CSS	MAS	630 m	MPC · JPL
402903	2007 TH_{38}	—	October 4, 2007	Catalina	CSS	·	940 m	MPC · JPL
402904	2007 TY_{41}	—	September 12, 2007	Mount Lemmon	Mount Lemmon Survey	·	910 m	MPC · JPL
402905	2007 TU_{43}	—	October 7, 2007	Kitt Peak	Spacewatch	·	1.3 km	MPC · JPL
402906	2007 TU_{52}	—	October 4, 2007	Kitt Peak	Spacewatch	·	1.3 km	MPC · JPL
402907	2007 TF_{56}	—	October 4, 2007	Kitt Peak	Spacewatch	·	1.3 km	MPC · JPL
402908	2007 TW_{57}	—	September 9, 2007	Mount Lemmon	Mount Lemmon Survey	MAS	650 m	MPC · JPL
402909	2007 TL_{68}	—	October 10, 2007	Mount Lemmon	Mount Lemmon Survey	MAS	720 m	MPC · JPL
402910	2007 TC_{72}	—	October 14, 2007	Bergisch Gladbach	W. Bickel	·	1.1 km	MPC · JPL
402911	2007 TB_{78}	—	October 5, 2007	Kitt Peak	Spacewatch	·	1.3 km	MPC · JPL
402912	2007 TG_{80}	—	October 7, 2007	Catalina	CSS	MAS	1.0 km	MPC · JPL
402913	2007 TM_{97}	—	October 8, 2007	Anderson Mesa	LONEOS	·	1.0 km	MPC · JPL
402914	2007 TB_{122}	—	September 8, 2007	Mount Lemmon	Mount Lemmon Survey	MAS	960 m	MPC · JPL
402915	2007 TW_{126}	—	October 6, 2007	Kitt Peak	Spacewatch	·	880 m	MPC · JPL
402916	2007 TE_{130}	—	October 6, 2007	Kitt Peak	Spacewatch	·	1.0 km	MPC · JPL
402917	2007 TV_{130}	—	September 11, 2007	Catalina	CSS	·	1.3 km	MPC · JPL
402918	2007 TD_{137}	—	October 8, 2007	Kitt Peak	Spacewatch	·	1.0 km	MPC · JPL
402919	2007 TK_{140}	—	October 9, 2007	Mount Lemmon	Mount Lemmon Survey	·	1.3 km	MPC · JPL
402920 Tsawout	2007 TH_{142}	Tsawout	October 7, 2007	Mauna Kea	D. D. Balam	T_{j} (2.96) · 3:2	4.7 km	MPC · JPL
402921	2007 TD_{143}	—	October 9, 2007	Goodricke-Pigott	R. A. Tucker	·	1.6 km	MPC · JPL
402922	2007 TG_{150}	—	October 9, 2007	Socorro	LINEAR	·	670 m	MPC · JPL
402923	2007 TX_{151}	—	September 13, 2007	Kitt Peak	Spacewatch	·	1.1 km	MPC · JPL
402924	2007 TP_{156}	—	September 5, 2007	Mount Lemmon	Mount Lemmon Survey	·	940 m	MPC · JPL
402925	2007 TN_{157}	—	September 20, 2007	Catalina	CSS	·	1.1 km	MPC · JPL
402926	2007 TT_{162}	—	October 11, 2007	Socorro	LINEAR	3:2 · SHU	5.1 km	MPC · JPL
402927	2007 TS_{165}	—	October 11, 2007	Socorro	LINEAR	·	1.3 km	MPC · JPL
402928	2007 TD_{172}	—	October 13, 2007	Socorro	LINEAR	·	1.1 km	MPC · JPL
402929	2007 TU_{176}	—	October 6, 2007	Kitt Peak	Spacewatch	NYS	1.2 km	MPC · JPL
402930	2007 TJ_{181}	—	October 8, 2007	Anderson Mesa	LONEOS	·	1.4 km	MPC · JPL
402931	2007 TJ_{213}	—	October 7, 2007	Kitt Peak	Spacewatch	·	1.1 km	MPC · JPL
402932	2007 TN_{213}	—	October 7, 2007	Kitt Peak	Spacewatch	·	1.3 km	MPC · JPL
402933	2007 TB_{214}	—	October 7, 2007	Kitt Peak	Spacewatch	·	1 km	MPC · JPL
402934	2007 TO_{223}	—	October 10, 2007	Catalina	CSS	PHO	960 m	MPC · JPL
402935	2007 TH_{239}	—	October 10, 2007	Mount Lemmon	Mount Lemmon Survey	NYS	1.2 km	MPC · JPL
402936	2007 TP_{243}	—	September 12, 2007	Catalina	CSS	·	940 m	MPC · JPL
402937	2007 TQ_{252}	—	October 7, 2007	Mount Lemmon	Mount Lemmon Survey	·	1.0 km	MPC · JPL
402938	2007 TO_{260}	—	October 10, 2007	Kitt Peak	Spacewatch	3:2 · SHU	5.6 km	MPC · JPL
402939	2007 TP_{262}	—	October 10, 2007	Kitt Peak	Spacewatch	MAS	640 m	MPC · JPL
402940	2007 TK_{266}	—	October 12, 2007	Kitt Peak	Spacewatch	·	1.0 km	MPC · JPL
402941	2007 TA_{275}	—	October 11, 2007	Catalina	CSS	T_{j} (2.99) · 3:2 · SHU	4.9 km	MPC · JPL
402942	2007 TT_{311}	—	October 11, 2007	Mount Lemmon	Mount Lemmon Survey	·	1.2 km	MPC · JPL
402943	2007 TZ_{322}	—	October 11, 2007	Catalina	CSS	·	1.2 km	MPC · JPL
402944	2007 TT_{331}	—	October 11, 2007	Kitt Peak	Spacewatch	·	1.2 km	MPC · JPL
402945	2007 TB_{333}	—	October 11, 2007	Kitt Peak	Spacewatch	NYS	1.0 km	MPC · JPL
402946	2007 TN_{348}	—	September 3, 2007	Catalina	CSS	·	660 m	MPC · JPL
402947	2007 TS_{355}	—	October 11, 2007	Catalina	CSS	·	1.2 km	MPC · JPL
402948	2007 TT_{362}	—	October 14, 2007	Mount Lemmon	Mount Lemmon Survey	V	870 m	MPC · JPL
402949	2007 TL_{364}	—	October 15, 2007	Mount Lemmon	Mount Lemmon Survey	T_{j} (2.98) · 3:2	4.5 km	MPC · JPL
402950	2007 TV_{366}	—	October 9, 2007	Kitt Peak	Spacewatch	·	1.1 km	MPC · JPL
402951	2007 TK_{369}	—	October 7, 2007	Kitt Peak	Spacewatch	·	890 m	MPC · JPL
402952	2007 TD_{376}	—	October 15, 2007	Kitt Peak	Spacewatch	V	690 m	MPC · JPL
402953	2007 TL_{378}	—	October 12, 2007	Mount Lemmon	Mount Lemmon Survey	MAR	970 m	MPC · JPL
402954	2007 TV_{385}	—	October 15, 2007	Catalina	CSS	T_{j} (2.96) · 3:2	6.6 km	MPC · JPL
402955	2007 TN_{386}	—	October 15, 2007	Catalina	CSS	·	1.0 km	MPC · JPL
402956	2007 TP_{388}	—	October 13, 2007	Mount Lemmon	Mount Lemmon Survey	MAS	610 m	MPC · JPL
402957	2007 TJ_{400}	—	October 13, 2007	Catalina	CSS	·	1.0 km	MPC · JPL
402958	2007 TG_{406}	—	October 15, 2007	Catalina	CSS	3:2 · SHU	5.5 km	MPC · JPL
402959	2007 TU_{406}	—	October 15, 2007	Catalina	CSS	MAS	720 m	MPC · JPL
402960	2007 TT_{433}	—	October 12, 2007	Catalina	CSS	·	1.1 km	MPC · JPL
402961	2007 TY_{435}	—	October 14, 2007	Mount Lemmon	Mount Lemmon Survey	·	1.4 km	MPC · JPL
402962	2007 TM_{439}	—	October 4, 2007	Kitt Peak	Spacewatch	NYS	990 m	MPC · JPL
402963	2007 TR_{447}	—	October 19, 2007	Catalina	CSS	·	1.7 km	MPC · JPL
402964	2007 UP_{3}	—	October 17, 2007	Andrushivka	Andrushivka	·	1.3 km	MPC · JPL
402965	2007 UT_{4}	—	October 17, 2007	Dauban	Chante-Perdrix	·	830 m	MPC · JPL
402966	2007 UE_{9}	—	October 17, 2007	Anderson Mesa	LONEOS	T_{j} (2.99) · 3:2	5.0 km	MPC · JPL
402967	2007 UG_{18}	—	October 10, 2007	Catalina	CSS	·	950 m	MPC · JPL
402968	2007 UT_{29}	—	September 25, 2007	Mount Lemmon	Mount Lemmon Survey	·	860 m	MPC · JPL
402969	2007 UY_{47}	—	October 20, 2007	Mount Lemmon	Mount Lemmon Survey	NYS	1.2 km	MPC · JPL
402970	2007 UB_{49}	—	October 21, 2007	Kitt Peak	Spacewatch	V	630 m	MPC · JPL
402971	2007 UG_{56}	—	October 30, 2007	Mount Lemmon	Mount Lemmon Survey	·	1.0 km	MPC · JPL
402972	2007 UZ_{59}	—	October 30, 2007	Mount Lemmon	Mount Lemmon Survey	NYS	1.3 km	MPC · JPL
402973	2007 UB_{96}	—	October 20, 2007	Catalina	CSS	NYS	1.1 km	MPC · JPL
402974	2007 UT_{96}	—	October 30, 2007	Kitt Peak	Spacewatch	·	1.1 km	MPC · JPL
402975	2007 UX_{114}	—	October 31, 2007	Kitt Peak	Spacewatch	·	1.2 km	MPC · JPL
402976	2007 UM_{132}	—	October 20, 2007	Catalina	CSS	3:2 · SHU	6.3 km	MPC · JPL
402977	2007 UD_{136}	—	October 30, 2007	Catalina	CSS	·	1.0 km	MPC · JPL
402978	2007 UT_{138}	—	October 20, 2007	Mount Lemmon	Mount Lemmon Survey	·	1.0 km	MPC · JPL
402979	2007 US_{140}	—	November 5, 2007	XuYi	PMO NEO Survey Program	·	1.5 km	MPC · JPL
402980	2007 UZ_{141}	—	October 24, 2007	Mount Lemmon	Mount Lemmon Survey	3:2 · SHU	4.9 km	MPC · JPL
402981	2007 VF_{12}	—	November 4, 2007	La Sagra	OAM	NYS	1.0 km	MPC · JPL
402982	2007 VV_{14}	—	November 1, 2007	Kitt Peak	Spacewatch	NYS	1.1 km	MPC · JPL
402983	2007 VP_{40}	—	October 10, 2007	Mount Lemmon	Mount Lemmon Survey	·	2.1 km	MPC · JPL
402984	2007 VZ_{58}	—	November 1, 2007	Kitt Peak	Spacewatch	·	1.2 km	MPC · JPL
402985	2007 VN_{73}	—	November 2, 2007	Kitt Peak	Spacewatch	·	1.4 km	MPC · JPL
402986	2007 VJ_{80}	—	November 3, 2007	Kitt Peak	Spacewatch	MAS	600 m	MPC · JPL
402987	2007 VX_{85}	—	October 10, 2007	Anderson Mesa	LONEOS	·	1.1 km	MPC · JPL
402988	2007 VX_{87}	—	September 26, 2007	Mount Lemmon	Mount Lemmon Survey	·	1.2 km	MPC · JPL
402989	2007 VF_{89}	—	November 4, 2007	Socorro	LINEAR	MAS	890 m	MPC · JPL
402990	2007 VJ_{100}	—	November 2, 2007	Kitt Peak	Spacewatch	·	1.3 km	MPC · JPL
402991	2007 VJ_{151}	—	November 7, 2007	Kitt Peak	Spacewatch	·	2.1 km	MPC · JPL
402992	2007 VQ_{153}	—	October 5, 2007	Kitt Peak	Spacewatch	·	1.1 km	MPC · JPL
402993	2007 VB_{162}	—	October 16, 2007	Mount Lemmon	Mount Lemmon Survey	·	1.1 km	MPC · JPL
402994	2007 VU_{166}	—	November 5, 2007	Kitt Peak	Spacewatch	·	880 m	MPC · JPL
402995	2007 VC_{199}	—	November 9, 2007	Mount Lemmon	Mount Lemmon Survey	fast	1.8 km	MPC · JPL
402996	2007 VD_{228}	—	November 2, 2007	Kitt Peak	Spacewatch	·	1.5 km	MPC · JPL
402997	2007 VO_{232}	—	November 7, 2007	Kitt Peak	Spacewatch	·	1.5 km	MPC · JPL
402998	2007 VQ_{243}	—	November 11, 2007	Bisei SG Center	BATTeRS	·	1.0 km	MPC · JPL
402999	2007 VJ_{264}	—	November 13, 2007	Kitt Peak	Spacewatch	MAS	750 m	MPC · JPL
403000	2007 VJ_{265}	—	November 3, 2007	Kitt Peak	Spacewatch	·	1.2 km	MPC · JPL

back to top

== Meaning of names ==
As minor planet discoveries are confirmed, they are given a permanent number by the IAU's Minor Planet Center (MPC), and the discoverers can then submit names for them, following the IAU's naming conventions. The list below concerns those minor planets in the specified number-range that have received names, and explains the meanings of those names.

Official naming citations of newly named small Solar System bodies are approved and published in a bulletin by IAU's Working Group for Small Bodies Nomenclature (WGSBN). Before May 2021, citations were published in MPC's Minor Planet Circulars for many decades. Recent citations can also be found on the JPL Small-Body Database (SBDB). Until his death in 2016, German astronomer Lutz D. Schmadel compiled these citations into the Dictionary of Minor Planet Names (DMP) and regularly updated the collection.

Based on Paul Herget's The Names of the Minor Planets, Schmadel also researched the unclear origin of numerous asteroids, most of which had been named prior to World War II. This article incorporates text from this source, which is in the public domain: SBDB New namings may only be added to this list below after official publication as the preannouncement of names is condemned. The WGSBN publishes a comprehensive guideline for the naming rules of non-cometary small Solar System bodies.

Named minor planet	Provisional	This minor planet was named for...	Ref · Catalog
402008 Laborfalviróza	2003 QZ_{69}	Róza Laborfalvi (1817–1886), a Hungarian actress.	IAU · 402008
402841 Kamakawiwoʻole	2007 LE_{1}	Israel Kaʻanoʻi Kamakawiwoʻole (1959–1997), known as IZ, a Native Hawaiian musician and one of the most celebrated ukulele players of all time.	IAU · 402841
402852 Picardie	2007 RE_{12}	Picardie (Picardy) is a historic French region comprising the departments of Aisne, Oise, and Somme.	IAU · 402852
402920 Tsawout	2007 TH_{142}	The Tsawout First Nation, who live on Vancouver Island on the west coast of Canada.	JPL · 402920
