= List of minor planets: 749001–750000 =

The following is a partial list of minor planets, running from minor-planet number 749001 through 750000, inclusive. The primary data for this and other partial lists is based on JPL's "Small-Body Orbital Elements" and data available from the Minor Planet Center. Critical list information is also provided by the MPC, unless otherwise specified from Lowell Observatory. A detailed description of the table's columns and additional sources are given on the main page including a complete list of every page in this series, and a statistical break-up on the dynamical classification of minor planets.

Also see the summary list of all named bodies in numerical and alphabetical order, and the corresponding naming citations for the number range of this particular list. New namings may only be added to this list after official publication, as the preannouncement of names is condemned by the Working Group for Small Bodies Nomenclature of the International Astronomical Union.

Near-Earth obj.	MBA (inner)	MBA (outer)	Centaur
Mars-crosser	MBA (middle)	Jupiter trojan	Trans-Neptunian obj.
Unclassified

== 749001–749100 ==
Designation			Discovery			Properties		Ref
Permanent	Provisional	Named after	Date	Site	Discoverer(s)	Category	Diam.	Ref
749001	2014 DB_{60}	—	February 26, 2014	Haleakala	Pan-STARRS 1	EUN	960 m	MPC · JPL
749002	2014 DK_{63}	—	February 26, 2014	Haleakala	Pan-STARRS 1	HNS	860 m	MPC · JPL
749003	2014 DR_{63}	—	February 26, 2014	Haleakala	Pan-STARRS 1	·	1.0 km	MPC · JPL
749004	2014 DV_{64}	—	February 26, 2014	Haleakala	Pan-STARRS 1	EUN	790 m	MPC · JPL
749005	2014 DZ_{66}	—	March 18, 2010	Mount Lemmon	Mount Lemmon Survey	·	1.0 km	MPC · JPL
749006	2014 DA_{70}	—	March 8, 2005	Mount Lemmon	Mount Lemmon Survey	·	1.4 km	MPC · JPL
749007	2014 DY_{71}	—	February 26, 2014	Haleakala	Pan-STARRS 1	·	1.4 km	MPC · JPL
749008	2014 DD_{73}	—	February 26, 2014	Haleakala	Pan-STARRS 1	·	1.3 km	MPC · JPL
749009	2014 DN_{74}	—	February 26, 2014	Haleakala	Pan-STARRS 1	·	910 m	MPC · JPL
749010	2014 DK_{80}	—	June 29, 2011	Siding Spring	SSS	·	1.4 km	MPC · JPL
749011	2014 DH_{82}	—	December 19, 2009	Mount Lemmon	Mount Lemmon Survey	·	920 m	MPC · JPL
749012	2014 DM_{85}	—	February 26, 2014	Kitt Peak	Spacewatch	(18466)	2.0 km	MPC · JPL
749013	2014 DC_{86}	—	February 26, 2014	Mount Lemmon	Mount Lemmon Survey	·	2.4 km	MPC · JPL
749014	2014 DG_{88}	—	February 20, 2014	Mount Lemmon	Mount Lemmon Survey	·	950 m	MPC · JPL
749015	2014 DF_{91}	—	February 26, 2014	Haleakala	Pan-STARRS 1	L4	6.0 km	MPC · JPL
749016	2014 DJ_{93}	—	February 26, 2014	Haleakala	Pan-STARRS 1	·	940 m	MPC · JPL
749017	2014 DO_{94}	—	February 26, 2014	Haleakala	Pan-STARRS 1	T_{j} (2.98)	3.6 km	MPC · JPL
749018	2014 DP_{95}	—	October 16, 2009	Mount Lemmon	Mount Lemmon Survey	·	560 m	MPC · JPL
749019	2014 DB_{115}	—	January 23, 2014	Mount Lemmon	Mount Lemmon Survey	·	1.9 km	MPC · JPL
749020	2014 DQ_{117}	—	February 27, 2014	Kitt Peak	Spacewatch	HNS	780 m	MPC · JPL
749021	2014 DO_{118}	—	November 24, 2009	Kitt Peak	Spacewatch	·	790 m	MPC · JPL
749022	2014 DR_{123}	—	February 28, 2014	Haleakala	Pan-STARRS 1	HNS	740 m	MPC · JPL
749023	2014 DT_{126}	—	February 28, 2014	Haleakala	Pan-STARRS 1	·	2.2 km	MPC · JPL
749024	2014 DY_{126}	—	March 9, 2005	Mount Lemmon	Mount Lemmon Survey	·	1.3 km	MPC · JPL
749025	2014 DP_{127}	—	July 28, 2011	Haleakala	Pan-STARRS 1	·	1.3 km	MPC · JPL
749026	2014 DX_{128}	—	August 27, 2011	Haleakala	Pan-STARRS 1	·	2.3 km	MPC · JPL
749027	2014 DB_{130}	—	February 28, 2014	Haleakala	Pan-STARRS 1	·	970 m	MPC · JPL
749028	2014 DH_{132}	—	October 20, 2012	Kitt Peak	Spacewatch	·	1.1 km	MPC · JPL
749029	2014 DO_{134}	—	February 28, 2014	Haleakala	Pan-STARRS 1	NYS	930 m	MPC · JPL
749030	2014 DL_{135}	—	February 28, 2014	Haleakala	Pan-STARRS 1	·	1.2 km	MPC · JPL
749031	2014 DZ_{137}	—	February 27, 2014	Kitt Peak	Spacewatch	·	1.2 km	MPC · JPL
749032	2014 DK_{138}	—	September 4, 2008	Kitt Peak	Spacewatch	·	990 m	MPC · JPL
749033	2014 DX_{139}	—	September 7, 2004	Kitt Peak	Spacewatch	·	990 m	MPC · JPL
749034	2014 DZ_{140}	—	February 27, 2014	Mount Lemmon	Mount Lemmon Survey	·	1.0 km	MPC · JPL
749035	2014 DD_{144}	—	August 2, 2016	Haleakala	Pan-STARRS 1	3:2	4.3 km	MPC · JPL
749036	2014 DV_{146}	—	February 28, 2014	Mount Lemmon	Mount Lemmon Survey	EUN	1.0 km	MPC · JPL
749037	2014 DA_{147}	—	October 2, 2006	Mount Lemmon	Mount Lemmon Survey	·	1.4 km	MPC · JPL
749038	2014 DJ_{150}	—	February 24, 2014	Haleakala	Pan-STARRS 1	·	1.3 km	MPC · JPL
749039	2014 DM_{150}	—	February 25, 2014	Haleakala	Pan-STARRS 1	·	1.2 km	MPC · JPL
749040	2014 DR_{151}	—	February 26, 2014	Haleakala	Pan-STARRS 1	·	880 m	MPC · JPL
749041	2014 DW_{151}	—	February 26, 2014	Haleakala	Pan-STARRS 1	·	1.1 km	MPC · JPL
749042	2014 DR_{152}	—	March 15, 2010	Mount Lemmon	Mount Lemmon Survey	RAF	660 m	MPC · JPL
749043	2014 DW_{153}	—	February 12, 2008	Kitt Peak	Spacewatch	THM	2.0 km	MPC · JPL
749044	2014 DX_{154}	—	February 28, 2014	Haleakala	Pan-STARRS 1	V	600 m	MPC · JPL
749045	2014 DO_{156}	—	February 28, 2014	Haleakala	Pan-STARRS 1	EUN	1.0 km	MPC · JPL
749046	2014 DE_{157}	—	February 23, 2014	Mayhill-ISON	L. Elenin	·	1.2 km	MPC · JPL
749047	2014 DG_{157}	—	February 28, 2014	Haleakala	Pan-STARRS 1	EUN	840 m	MPC · JPL
749048	2014 DU_{158}	—	February 24, 2014	Haleakala	Pan-STARRS 1	HNS	1.0 km	MPC · JPL
749049	2014 DL_{159}	—	February 26, 2014	Mount Lemmon	Mount Lemmon Survey	·	1 km	MPC · JPL
749050	2014 DX_{159}	—	February 26, 2014	Haleakala	Pan-STARRS 1	·	1.1 km	MPC · JPL
749051	2014 DG_{161}	—	February 26, 2014	Haleakala	Pan-STARRS 1	HNS	750 m	MPC · JPL
749052	2014 DL_{162}	—	February 28, 2014	Haleakala	Pan-STARRS 1	MAR	910 m	MPC · JPL
749053	2014 DS_{162}	—	February 26, 2014	Haleakala	Pan-STARRS 1	·	1.6 km	MPC · JPL
749054	2014 DT_{164}	—	June 7, 2015	Mount Lemmon	Mount Lemmon Survey	EUN	850 m	MPC · JPL
749055	2014 DQ_{166}	—	February 22, 2014	Kitt Peak	Spacewatch	·	1.0 km	MPC · JPL
749056	2014 DM_{167}	—	February 26, 2014	Haleakala	Pan-STARRS 1	·	2.4 km	MPC · JPL
749057	2014 DH_{168}	—	February 28, 2014	Haleakala	Pan-STARRS 1	·	840 m	MPC · JPL
749058	2014 DJ_{168}	—	February 26, 2014	Haleakala	Pan-STARRS 1	(5)	950 m	MPC · JPL
749059	2014 DZ_{169}	—	February 27, 2014	Mount Lemmon	Mount Lemmon Survey	THM	1.7 km	MPC · JPL
749060	2014 DG_{170}	—	February 18, 2014	Mount Lemmon	Mount Lemmon Survey	URS	2.7 km	MPC · JPL
749061	2014 DC_{175}	—	February 26, 2014	Haleakala	Pan-STARRS 1	·	990 m	MPC · JPL
749062	2014 DZ_{176}	—	September 13, 2007	Mount Lemmon	Mount Lemmon Survey	·	1.2 km	MPC · JPL
749063	2014 DP_{178}	—	February 26, 2014	Haleakala	Pan-STARRS 1	·	1.4 km	MPC · JPL
749064	2014 DV_{183}	—	February 26, 2014	Haleakala	Pan-STARRS 1	·	2.4 km	MPC · JPL
749065	2014 DR_{188}	—	November 6, 2008	Catalina	CSS	JUN	880 m	MPC · JPL
749066	2014 ET_{4}	—	February 20, 2014	Kitt Peak	Spacewatch	·	820 m	MPC · JPL
749067	2014 EH_{13}	—	December 1, 2005	Kitt Peak	Wasserman, L. H., Millis, R. L.	·	780 m	MPC · JPL
749068	2014 ER_{19}	—	June 12, 2007	Kitt Peak	Spacewatch	·	1.1 km	MPC · JPL
749069	2014 EW_{19}	—	February 25, 2014	Kitt Peak	Spacewatch	·	940 m	MPC · JPL
749070	2014 EZ_{20}	—	April 25, 2007	Kitt Peak	Spacewatch	·	900 m	MPC · JPL
749071	2014 EO_{21}	—	March 8, 2014	Mount Lemmon	Mount Lemmon Survey	·	1.4 km	MPC · JPL
749072	2014 EA_{30}	—	February 26, 2014	Haleakala	Pan-STARRS 1	·	1.4 km	MPC · JPL
749073	2014 EP_{30}	—	February 27, 2014	Haleakala	Pan-STARRS 1	·	1.5 km	MPC · JPL
749074	2014 EW_{40}	—	January 14, 2002	Palomar	NEAT	·	1.2 km	MPC · JPL
749075	2014 ES_{41}	—	January 16, 2013	Haleakala	Pan-STARRS 1	3:2	4.2 km	MPC · JPL
749076	2014 EF_{42}	—	March 8, 2014	Mount Lemmon	Mount Lemmon Survey	·	2.6 km	MPC · JPL
749077	2014 ES_{42}	—	October 22, 2011	Mount Lemmon	Mount Lemmon Survey	·	1.7 km	MPC · JPL
749078	2014 EW_{42}	—	March 9, 2014	Haleakala	Pan-STARRS 1	·	790 m	MPC · JPL
749079	2014 EZ_{45}	—	May 5, 2010	Zelenchukskaya Stn	T. V. Krjačko, Satovski, B.	·	1.2 km	MPC · JPL
749080	2014 ER_{48}	—	December 2, 2010	Mount Lemmon	Mount Lemmon Survey	H	570 m	MPC · JPL
749081	2014 EZ_{48}	—	March 12, 2014	Catalina	CSS	APO	450 m	MPC · JPL
749082	2014 EE_{49}	—	November 28, 2013	Haleakala	Pan-STARRS 1	PHO	990 m	MPC · JPL
749083	2014 ES_{52}	—	October 1, 2016	Mount Lemmon	Mount Lemmon Survey	·	1.0 km	MPC · JPL
749084	2014 EZ_{53}	—	June 14, 2015	Mount Lemmon	Mount Lemmon Survey	ADE	1.4 km	MPC · JPL
749085	2014 EK_{57}	—	September 2, 2011	Haleakala	Pan-STARRS 1	·	1.2 km	MPC · JPL
749086	2014 EK_{61}	—	April 26, 2003	Kitt Peak	Spacewatch	·	2.4 km	MPC · JPL
749087	2014 ET_{73}	—	July 28, 2015	Haleakala	Pan-STARRS 1	·	730 m	MPC · JPL
749088	2014 EV_{78}	—	September 20, 2011	Kitt Peak	Spacewatch	URS	2.3 km	MPC · JPL
749089	2014 EA_{81}	—	January 28, 2014	Kitt Peak	Spacewatch	·	960 m	MPC · JPL
749090	2014 EA_{88}	—	February 3, 2013	Haleakala	Pan-STARRS 1	L4	6.6 km	MPC · JPL
749091	2014 ED_{94}	—	August 24, 2012	Kitt Peak	Spacewatch	·	1.1 km	MPC · JPL
749092	2014 EM_{94}	—	September 5, 2008	Kitt Peak	Spacewatch	(5)	750 m	MPC · JPL
749093	2014 EO_{102}	—	November 4, 2016	Haleakala	Pan-STARRS 1	(5)	950 m	MPC · JPL
749094	2014 EA_{112}	—	June 22, 2015	Haleakala	Pan-STARRS 1	·	2.2 km	MPC · JPL
749095	2014 EA_{114}	—	October 5, 2003	Kitt Peak	Spacewatch	·	1.3 km	MPC · JPL
749096	2014 EJ_{125}	—	February 22, 2014	Haleakala	Pan-STARRS 1	JUN	810 m	MPC · JPL
749097	2014 ET_{138}	—	November 23, 2003	Kitt Peak	Spacewatch	GEF	890 m	MPC · JPL
749098	2014 ER_{144}	—	May 21, 2015	Haleakala	Pan-STARRS 1	·	930 m	MPC · JPL
749099	2014 EL_{145}	—	October 24, 2016	Mount Lemmon	Mount Lemmon Survey	·	1.1 km	MPC · JPL
749100	2014 EN_{148}	—	October 9, 2007	Mount Lemmon	Mount Lemmon Survey	ADE	1.3 km	MPC · JPL

== 749101–749200 ==
back to top

Designation			Discovery			Properties		Ref
Permanent	Provisional	Named after	Date	Site	Discoverer(s)	Category	Diam.	Ref
749101	2014 ER_{148}	—	December 30, 2007	Kitt Peak	Spacewatch	·	2.3 km	MPC · JPL
749102	2014 EW_{162}	—	October 5, 2016	Mount Lemmon	Mount Lemmon Survey	·	1.1 km	MPC · JPL
749103	2014 EU_{163}	—	July 25, 2015	Haleakala	Pan-STARRS 1	·	820 m	MPC · JPL
749104	2014 EZ_{164}	—	August 28, 2016	Mount Lemmon	Mount Lemmon Survey	·	900 m	MPC · JPL
749105	2014 EO_{165}	—	May 21, 2015	Haleakala	Pan-STARRS 1	·	850 m	MPC · JPL
749106	2014 EU_{165}	—	January 10, 2013	Haleakala	Pan-STARRS 1	L4 · (8060)	6.8 km	MPC · JPL
749107	2014 EB_{183}	—	February 28, 2014	Haleakala	Pan-STARRS 1	·	1.1 km	MPC · JPL
749108	2014 EC_{188}	—	September 19, 2011	Mount Lemmon	Mount Lemmon Survey	·	2.2 km	MPC · JPL
749109	2014 EF_{189}	—	March 4, 2014	Cerro Tololo	DECam	KON	1.7 km	MPC · JPL
749110	2014 EU_{195}	—	August 8, 2016	Haleakala	Pan-STARRS 1	EOS	1.5 km	MPC · JPL
749111	2014 ES_{197}	—	November 6, 2005	Kitt Peak	Spacewatch	·	930 m	MPC · JPL
749112	2014 ET_{198}	—	February 28, 2014	Haleakala	Pan-STARRS 1	·	1.3 km	MPC · JPL
749113	2014 EQ_{199}	—	November 28, 2010	Mount Lemmon	Mount Lemmon Survey	L4	5.4 km	MPC · JPL
749114	2014 ET_{199}	—	May 25, 2006	Mauna Kea	P. A. Wiegert	·	1.5 km	MPC · JPL
749115	2014 EW_{214}	—	October 20, 2012	Nogales	M. Schwartz, P. R. Holvorcem	MAR	1.4 km	MPC · JPL
749116	2014 EQ_{216}	—	March 5, 2014	Cerro Tololo	DECam	·	970 m	MPC · JPL
749117	2014 EW_{218}	—	October 12, 2016	Mount Lemmon	Mount Lemmon Survey	·	1.2 km	MPC · JPL
749118	2014 EZ_{223}	—	September 5, 2008	Kitt Peak	Spacewatch	·	900 m	MPC · JPL
749119	2014 EJ_{225}	—	October 21, 2003	Kitt Peak	Spacewatch	·	1.2 km	MPC · JPL
749120	2014 EK_{229}	—	June 15, 2015	Haleakala	Pan-STARRS 1	EOS	1.2 km	MPC · JPL
749121	2014 EL_{230}	—	November 19, 2007	Kitt Peak	Spacewatch	·	1.5 km	MPC · JPL
749122	2014 EN_{230}	—	September 23, 2008	Kitt Peak	Spacewatch	·	970 m	MPC · JPL
749123	2014 EQ_{236}	—	August 14, 2016	Haleakala	Pan-STARRS 1	·	790 m	MPC · JPL
749124	2014 EV_{240}	—	September 22, 2009	Kitt Peak	Spacewatch	L4	6.1 km	MPC · JPL
749125	2014 ES_{243}	—	May 4, 2009	Mount Lemmon	Mount Lemmon Survey	VER	2.1 km	MPC · JPL
749126	2014 EB_{244}	—	September 2, 2011	Haleakala	Pan-STARRS 1	EOS	1.5 km	MPC · JPL
749127	2014 ED_{244}	—	July 29, 2008	Mount Lemmon	Mount Lemmon Survey	L4	6.1 km	MPC · JPL
749128	2014 EH_{249}	—	March 9, 2014	Haleakala	Pan-STARRS 1	EUN	1.1 km	MPC · JPL
749129	2014 EX_{253}	—	March 4, 2014	Haleakala	Pan-STARRS 1	·	2.2 km	MPC · JPL
749130	2014 EB_{254}	—	March 13, 2014	Mount Lemmon	Mount Lemmon Survey	·	1.4 km	MPC · JPL
749131	2014 ER_{255}	—	March 6, 2014	Mount Lemmon	Mount Lemmon Survey	·	1.7 km	MPC · JPL
749132	2014 EO_{258}	—	March 7, 2014	Mount Lemmon	Mount Lemmon Survey	·	1.5 km	MPC · JPL
749133	2014 FH_{1}	—	September 15, 2007	Mount Lemmon	Mount Lemmon Survey	·	1.5 km	MPC · JPL
749134	2014 FC_{2}	—	January 17, 2013	Haleakala	Pan-STARRS 1	·	3.0 km	MPC · JPL
749135	2014 FX_{2}	—	February 28, 2014	Mount Lemmon	Mount Lemmon Survey	·	1.2 km	MPC · JPL
749136	2014 FW_{7}	—	October 8, 2012	Kitt Peak	Spacewatch	·	1.1 km	MPC · JPL
749137	2014 FY_{9}	—	February 21, 2007	Mount Lemmon	Mount Lemmon Survey	·	770 m	MPC · JPL
749138	2014 FW_{10}	—	January 7, 2013	Mount Lemmon	Mount Lemmon Survey	·	3.5 km	MPC · JPL
749139	2014 FE_{13}	—	March 20, 2014	Mount Lemmon	Mount Lemmon Survey	·	1.5 km	MPC · JPL
749140	2014 FN_{14}	—	March 5, 2014	Kitt Peak	Spacewatch	HNS	960 m	MPC · JPL
749141	2014 FY_{16}	—	March 20, 2014	Mount Lemmon	Mount Lemmon Survey	EUN	1.3 km	MPC · JPL
749142	2014 FB_{23}	—	October 8, 2008	Kitt Peak	Spacewatch	·	1.1 km	MPC · JPL
749143	2014 FY_{23}	—	May 7, 2010	Mount Lemmon	Mount Lemmon Survey	·	1.7 km	MPC · JPL
749144	2014 FQ_{24}	—	February 21, 2014	Haleakala	Pan-STARRS 1	·	1.6 km	MPC · JPL
749145	2014 FV_{24}	—	February 28, 2014	Haleakala	Pan-STARRS 1	·	1.3 km	MPC · JPL
749146	2014 FP_{28}	—	November 11, 2012	Nogales	M. Schwartz, P. R. Holvorcem	·	890 m	MPC · JPL
749147	2014 FT_{30}	—	March 23, 2014	Mount Lemmon	Mount Lemmon Survey	·	1.4 km	MPC · JPL
749148	2014 FH_{31}	—	September 14, 2012	Catalina	CSS	·	990 m	MPC · JPL
749149	2014 FW_{34}	—	February 24, 2014	Haleakala	Pan-STARRS 1	JUN	1.1 km	MPC · JPL
749150	2014 FL_{40}	—	February 27, 2014	Kitt Peak	Spacewatch	·	1.2 km	MPC · JPL
749151	2014 FE_{41}	—	March 26, 2014	Mount Lemmon	Mount Lemmon Survey	·	990 m	MPC · JPL
749152	2014 FA_{42}	—	March 27, 2014	Mount Lemmon	Mount Lemmon Survey	HNS	860 m	MPC · JPL
749153	2014 FD_{46}	—	March 25, 2014	Haleakala	Pan-STARRS 1	(194)	1.0 km	MPC · JPL
749154	2014 FD_{48}	—	September 23, 2012	Mount Lemmon	Mount Lemmon Survey	·	3.0 km	MPC · JPL
749155	2014 FF_{51}	—	February 28, 2014	Haleakala	Pan-STARRS 1	·	2.2 km	MPC · JPL
749156	2014 FU_{51}	—	March 22, 2014	Kitt Peak	Spacewatch	·	800 m	MPC · JPL
749157	2014 FM_{52}	—	October 8, 2012	Mount Lemmon	Mount Lemmon Survey	EUN	1.0 km	MPC · JPL
749158	2014 FX_{53}	—	October 2, 2008	Mount Lemmon	Mount Lemmon Survey	·	1.0 km	MPC · JPL
749159	2014 FA_{55}	—	March 25, 2014	Kitt Peak	Spacewatch	3:2	4.2 km	MPC · JPL
749160	2014 FL_{55}	—	March 29, 2014	Mount Lemmon	Mount Lemmon Survey	·	1.9 km	MPC · JPL
749161	2014 FV_{59}	—	April 1, 2014	Mount Lemmon	Mount Lemmon Survey	·	890 m	MPC · JPL
749162	2014 FK_{61}	—	April 1, 2014	Mount Lemmon	Mount Lemmon Survey	·	2.3 km	MPC · JPL
749163	2014 FP_{66}	—	March 31, 2014	Mount Lemmon	Mount Lemmon Survey	·	2.0 km	MPC · JPL
749164	2014 FY_{68}	—	April 28, 2014	Haleakala	Pan-STARRS 1	HNS	1.3 km	MPC · JPL
749165	2014 FH_{73}	—	March 17, 2001	Kitt Peak	Spacewatch	·	1.2 km	MPC · JPL
749166	2014 FS_{74}	—	November 4, 2012	Mount Lemmon	Mount Lemmon Survey	·	1.0 km	MPC · JPL
749167	2014 FJ_{75}	—	October 19, 2011	Mount Lemmon	Mount Lemmon Survey	·	1.5 km	MPC · JPL
749168	2014 FO_{75}	—	September 26, 2011	Mount Lemmon	Mount Lemmon Survey	·	1.4 km	MPC · JPL
749169	2014 FS_{75}	—	March 25, 2014	Kitt Peak	Spacewatch	·	1.4 km	MPC · JPL
749170	2014 FR_{76}	—	March 28, 2014	Mount Lemmon	Mount Lemmon Survey	·	1.1 km	MPC · JPL
749171	2014 FG_{80}	—	December 17, 1996	Kitt Peak	Spacewatch	·	1.1 km	MPC · JPL
749172	2014 FB_{83}	—	March 23, 2014	Catalina	CSS	·	800 m	MPC · JPL
749173	2014 FH_{84}	—	November 20, 2008	Kitt Peak	Spacewatch	MAR	880 m	MPC · JPL
749174	2014 GZ	—	April 1, 2014	Mount Lemmon	Mount Lemmon Survey	·	1.7 km	MPC · JPL
749175	2014 GG_{3}	—	September 22, 2008	Kitt Peak	Spacewatch	·	800 m	MPC · JPL
749176	2014 GK_{3}	—	February 26, 2014	Haleakala	Pan-STARRS 1	·	1.3 km	MPC · JPL
749177	2014 GK_{4}	—	September 9, 2007	Mount Lemmon	Mount Lemmon Survey	·	1.6 km	MPC · JPL
749178	2014 GS_{4}	—	September 26, 2011	Mount Lemmon	Mount Lemmon Survey	·	1.5 km	MPC · JPL
749179	2014 GN_{6}	—	February 26, 2014	Haleakala	Pan-STARRS 1	·	1.1 km	MPC · JPL
749180	2014 GP_{6}	—	March 12, 2010	Kitt Peak	Spacewatch	·	820 m	MPC · JPL
749181	2014 GX_{7}	—	April 1, 2014	Mount Lemmon	Mount Lemmon Survey	·	1.4 km	MPC · JPL
749182	2014 GA_{8}	—	March 8, 2014	Mount Lemmon	Mount Lemmon Survey	MAR	1.1 km	MPC · JPL
749183	2014 GQ_{8}	—	February 18, 2010	Mount Lemmon	Mount Lemmon Survey	·	1.2 km	MPC · JPL
749184	2014 GQ_{15}	—	February 28, 2014	Haleakala	Pan-STARRS 1	·	930 m	MPC · JPL
749185	2014 GW_{15}	—	February 28, 2014	Haleakala	Pan-STARRS 1	·	810 m	MPC · JPL
749186	2014 GO_{18}	—	April 2, 2014	Mount Lemmon	Mount Lemmon Survey	·	1.5 km	MPC · JPL
749187	2014 GB_{19}	—	April 4, 2014	Mount Lemmon	Mount Lemmon Survey	(5)	750 m	MPC · JPL
749188	2014 GE_{25}	—	February 25, 2014	Haleakala	Pan-STARRS 1	·	1.4 km	MPC · JPL
749189	2014 GW_{26}	—	February 27, 2014	Haleakala	Pan-STARRS 1	·	1.1 km	MPC · JPL
749190	2014 GU_{28}	—	March 31, 2014	Kitt Peak	Spacewatch	·	800 m	MPC · JPL
749191	2014 GT_{30}	—	April 4, 2014	Haleakala	Pan-STARRS 1	MRX	760 m	MPC · JPL
749192	2014 GG_{34}	—	April 5, 2014	Haleakala	Pan-STARRS 1	BAR	880 m	MPC · JPL
749193	2014 GS_{36}	—	April 3, 2014	XuYi	PMO NEO Survey Program	·	1.3 km	MPC · JPL
749194	2014 GL_{37}	—	January 10, 2010	Kitt Peak	Spacewatch	·	1 km	MPC · JPL
749195	2014 GS_{37}	—	October 27, 2012	Mount Lemmon	Mount Lemmon Survey	GEF	1.0 km	MPC · JPL
749196	2014 GD_{39}	—	April 4, 2014	Mount Lemmon	Mount Lemmon Survey	·	2.7 km	MPC · JPL
749197	2014 GN_{41}	—	April 1, 2014	Kitt Peak	Spacewatch	EUN	980 m	MPC · JPL
749198	2014 GC_{46}	—	April 4, 2014	Catalina	CSS	·	1.5 km	MPC · JPL
749199	2014 GN_{46}	—	February 25, 2014	Haleakala	Pan-STARRS 1	EUN	1.3 km	MPC · JPL
749200	2014 GN_{48}	—	March 10, 2014	Mount Lemmon	Mount Lemmon Survey	·	1.3 km	MPC · JPL

== 749201–749300 ==
back to top

Designation			Discovery			Properties		Ref
Permanent	Provisional	Named after	Date	Site	Discoverer(s)	Category	Diam.	Ref
749201	2014 GX_{49}	—	February 12, 2011	Catalina	CSS	H	520 m	MPC · JPL
749202	2014 GE_{51}	—	March 1, 2008	Kitt Peak	Spacewatch	·	2.8 km	MPC · JPL
749203	2014 GH_{51}	—	April 24, 2006	Kitt Peak	Spacewatch	·	1.3 km	MPC · JPL
749204	2014 GC_{55}	—	April 4, 2014	Kitt Peak	Spacewatch	·	1.3 km	MPC · JPL
749205	2014 GJ_{55}	—	April 11, 2010	Kitt Peak	Spacewatch	HNS	810 m	MPC · JPL
749206	2014 GZ_{58}	—	January 31, 2009	Mount Lemmon	Mount Lemmon Survey	·	1.5 km	MPC · JPL
749207	2014 GQ_{59}	—	October 18, 2008	Kitt Peak	Spacewatch	·	1.0 km	MPC · JPL
749208	2014 GQ_{62}	—	April 5, 2014	Haleakala	Pan-STARRS 1	·	1.5 km	MPC · JPL
749209	2014 GQ_{64}	—	April 10, 2014	Haleakala	Pan-STARRS 1	·	1.1 km	MPC · JPL
749210	2014 GH_{65}	—	April 8, 2014	Haleakala	Pan-STARRS 1	EUN	1.0 km	MPC · JPL
749211	2014 GT_{65}	—	April 5, 2014	Haleakala	Pan-STARRS 1	·	1.2 km	MPC · JPL
749212	2014 GA_{66}	—	April 4, 2014	Kitt Peak	Spacewatch	·	970 m	MPC · JPL
749213	2014 GZ_{74}	—	February 21, 2001	Apache Point	SDSS	·	1.2 km	MPC · JPL
749214	2014 GC_{75}	—	April 5, 2014	Haleakala	Pan-STARRS 1	·	2.4 km	MPC · JPL
749215	2014 GH_{75}	—	April 4, 2014	Haleakala	Pan-STARRS 1	·	1.1 km	MPC · JPL
749216	2014 GS_{78}	—	April 5, 2014	Haleakala	Pan-STARRS 1	·	1.4 km	MPC · JPL
749217	2014 GA_{79}	—	April 7, 2014	Mount Lemmon	Mount Lemmon Survey	3:2	4.6 km	MPC · JPL
749218	2014 GG_{80}	—	April 4, 2014	Haleakala	Pan-STARRS 1	·	1.1 km	MPC · JPL
749219	2014 GK_{80}	—	April 10, 2014	Haleakala	Pan-STARRS 1	·	1.3 km	MPC · JPL
749220	2014 GT_{80}	—	April 10, 2014	Haleakala	Pan-STARRS 1	·	930 m	MPC · JPL
749221	2014 GV_{82}	—	April 5, 2014	Haleakala	Pan-STARRS 1	·	1.3 km	MPC · JPL
749222	2014 GX_{82}	—	April 4, 2014	Haleakala	Pan-STARRS 1	·	1.4 km	MPC · JPL
749223	2014 GM_{89}	—	April 5, 2014	Haleakala	Pan-STARRS 1	·	2.5 km	MPC · JPL
749224	2014 HY	—	November 5, 2005	Apache Point	SDSS Collaboration	·	670 m	MPC · JPL
749225	2014 HL_{1}	—	March 24, 2014	Haleakala	Pan-STARRS 1	·	990 m	MPC · JPL
749226	2014 HB_{2}	—	February 28, 2014	Haleakala	Pan-STARRS 1	·	1.6 km	MPC · JPL
749227	2014 HE_{7}	—	December 23, 2012	Haleakala	Pan-STARRS 1	·	1.6 km	MPC · JPL
749228	2014 HN_{7}	—	March 25, 2003	Kitt Peak	Spacewatch	·	950 m	MPC · JPL
749229	2014 HO_{7}	—	March 25, 2014	Kitt Peak	Spacewatch	·	1.2 km	MPC · JPL
749230	2014 HC_{11}	—	April 3, 2014	XuYi	PMO NEO Survey Program	·	1.4 km	MPC · JPL
749231	2014 HT_{13}	—	August 24, 2011	Haleakala	Pan-STARRS 1	·	1.7 km	MPC · JPL
749232	2014 HK_{15}	—	March 25, 2014	Kitt Peak	Spacewatch	·	1.2 km	MPC · JPL
749233	2014 HL_{20}	—	April 4, 2014	Haleakala	Pan-STARRS 1	·	1.2 km	MPC · JPL
749234	2014 HJ_{23}	—	February 28, 2014	Haleakala	Pan-STARRS 1	·	1.6 km	MPC · JPL
749235	2014 HY_{23}	—	April 5, 2014	Haleakala	Pan-STARRS 1	EUN	880 m	MPC · JPL
749236	2014 HD_{28}	—	March 18, 2010	Kitt Peak	Spacewatch	·	1.1 km	MPC · JPL
749237	2014 HB_{29}	—	October 27, 2005	Kitt Peak	Spacewatch	·	770 m	MPC · JPL
749238	2014 HE_{31}	—	September 27, 2008	Mount Lemmon	Mount Lemmon Survey	·	980 m	MPC · JPL
749239	2014 HS_{31}	—	April 6, 2014	Mount Lemmon	Mount Lemmon Survey	·	970 m	MPC · JPL
749240	2014 HA_{32}	—	April 6, 2014	Kitt Peak	Spacewatch	ADE	1.6 km	MPC · JPL
749241	2014 HZ_{34}	—	April 24, 2014	Mount Lemmon	Mount Lemmon Survey	·	590 m	MPC · JPL
749242	2014 HT_{35}	—	October 26, 2011	Haleakala	Pan-STARRS 1	·	1.6 km	MPC · JPL
749243	2014 HH_{42}	—	March 27, 2014	Haleakala	Pan-STARRS 1	·	1.8 km	MPC · JPL
749244	2014 HA_{43}	—	August 20, 2011	Haleakala	Pan-STARRS 1	·	1.1 km	MPC · JPL
749245	2014 HO_{45}	—	November 14, 2012	Kitt Peak	Spacewatch	KON	1.9 km	MPC · JPL
749246	2014 HM_{46}	—	May 1, 2006	Reedy Creek	J. Broughton	H	560 m	MPC · JPL
749247	2014 HA_{47}	—	April 20, 2014	Mount Lemmon	Mount Lemmon Survey	·	1.1 km	MPC · JPL
749248	2014 HH_{47}	—	November 7, 2012	Kitt Peak	Spacewatch	·	680 m	MPC · JPL
749249	2014 HY_{47}	—	February 14, 2010	Mount Lemmon	Mount Lemmon Survey	NYS	900 m	MPC · JPL
749250	2014 HE_{48}	—	October 12, 2007	Mount Lemmon	Mount Lemmon Survey	·	1.7 km	MPC · JPL
749251	2014 HQ_{48}	—	November 19, 2007	Kitt Peak	Spacewatch	AST	1.3 km	MPC · JPL
749252	2014 HA_{49}	—	November 3, 2011	Kitt Peak	Spacewatch	·	2.6 km	MPC · JPL
749253	2014 HB_{49}	—	April 23, 2014	Cerro Tololo	DECam	·	810 m	MPC · JPL
749254	2014 HG_{49}	—	November 2, 2007	Kitt Peak	Spacewatch	·	1.6 km	MPC · JPL
749255	2014 HH_{49}	—	April 5, 2014	Haleakala	Pan-STARRS 1	·	750 m	MPC · JPL
749256	2014 HZ_{50}	—	April 6, 2005	Mount Lemmon	Mount Lemmon Survey	·	1.6 km	MPC · JPL
749257	2014 HD_{51}	—	January 23, 2006	Kitt Peak	Spacewatch	NYS	890 m	MPC · JPL
749258	2014 HJ_{51}	—	January 16, 2013	Haleakala	Pan-STARRS 1	·	1.1 km	MPC · JPL
749259	2014 HP_{51}	—	November 2, 2007	Mount Lemmon	Mount Lemmon Survey	·	1.3 km	MPC · JPL
749260	2014 HQ_{51}	—	December 21, 2008	Kitt Peak	Spacewatch	·	900 m	MPC · JPL
749261	2014 HC_{52}	—	September 8, 2011	Kitt Peak	Spacewatch	MAS	590 m	MPC · JPL
749262	2014 HC_{54}	—	April 23, 2014	Cerro Tololo	DECam	·	1.3 km	MPC · JPL
749263	2014 HL_{54}	—	April 4, 2014	Haleakala	Pan-STARRS 1	KOR	1.2 km	MPC · JPL
749264	2014 HS_{54}	—	October 8, 2007	Mount Lemmon	Mount Lemmon Survey	·	1.2 km	MPC · JPL
749265	2014 HU_{56}	—	November 18, 2007	Mount Lemmon	Mount Lemmon Survey	·	1.4 km	MPC · JPL
749266	2014 HA_{57}	—	April 23, 2014	Cerro Tololo	DECam	·	1.6 km	MPC · JPL
749267	2014 HW_{57}	—	April 23, 2014	Cerro Tololo	DECam	(12739)	1.3 km	MPC · JPL
749268	2014 HE_{58}	—	January 18, 2009	Mount Lemmon	Mount Lemmon Survey	(5)	990 m	MPC · JPL
749269	2014 HX_{58}	—	October 21, 2008	Mount Lemmon	Mount Lemmon Survey	·	770 m	MPC · JPL
749270	2014 HZ_{58}	—	September 23, 2011	Haleakala	Pan-STARRS 1	HOF	1.9 km	MPC · JPL
749271	2014 HO_{59}	—	December 2, 2005	Kitt Peak	Wasserman, L. H., Millis, R. L.	NYS	740 m	MPC · JPL
749272	2014 HD_{60}	—	December 22, 2008	Kitt Peak	Spacewatch	·	1.2 km	MPC · JPL
749273	2014 HD_{61}	—	April 5, 2014	Haleakala	Pan-STARRS 1	·	1.9 km	MPC · JPL
749274	2014 HQ_{61}	—	April 23, 2014	Cerro Tololo	DECam	·	1.4 km	MPC · JPL
749275	2014 HS_{61}	—	April 24, 2014	Haleakala	Pan-STARRS 1	·	1.5 km	MPC · JPL
749276	2014 HV_{61}	—	January 20, 2009	Kitt Peak	Spacewatch	·	1.6 km	MPC · JPL
749277	2014 HR_{62}	—	February 23, 2009	Calar Alto	F. Hormuth	·	1.2 km	MPC · JPL
749278	2014 HM_{63}	—	April 23, 2014	Cerro Tololo	DECam	·	2.0 km	MPC · JPL
749279	2014 HQ_{63}	—	January 16, 2009	Kitt Peak	Spacewatch	·	1.1 km	MPC · JPL
749280	2014 HK_{64}	—	December 29, 2008	Kitt Peak	Spacewatch	·	820 m	MPC · JPL
749281	2014 HO_{64}	—	April 5, 2014	Haleakala	Pan-STARRS 1	·	870 m	MPC · JPL
749282	2014 HC_{65}	—	December 22, 2008	Mount Lemmon	Mount Lemmon Survey	·	910 m	MPC · JPL
749283	2014 HH_{65}	—	April 23, 2014	Cerro Tololo	DECam	·	2.3 km	MPC · JPL
749284	2014 HR_{65}	—	April 23, 2014	Cerro Tololo	DECam	·	1.3 km	MPC · JPL
749285	2014 HW_{65}	—	September 15, 2010	Kitt Peak	Spacewatch	·	2.4 km	MPC · JPL
749286	2014 HQ_{67}	—	October 22, 2011	Mount Lemmon	Mount Lemmon Survey	·	1.3 km	MPC · JPL
749287	2014 HK_{68}	—	April 23, 2014	Cerro Tololo	DECam	·	1.5 km	MPC · JPL
749288	2014 HM_{68}	—	October 31, 2010	Mount Lemmon	Mount Lemmon Survey	·	2.1 km	MPC · JPL
749289	2014 HO_{68}	—	September 15, 2007	Lulin	LUSS	·	1.0 km	MPC · JPL
749290	2014 HD_{70}	—	October 20, 2007	Mount Lemmon	Mount Lemmon Survey	AGN	1.0 km	MPC · JPL
749291	2014 HB_{71}	—	September 12, 2001	Kitt Peak	Deep Ecliptic Survey	KOR	1.0 km	MPC · JPL
749292	2014 HM_{74}	—	September 13, 2007	Mount Lemmon	Mount Lemmon Survey	·	880 m	MPC · JPL
749293	2014 HH_{76}	—	September 29, 2003	Kitt Peak	Spacewatch	·	1.1 km	MPC · JPL
749294	2014 HQ_{76}	—	March 1, 2009	Mount Lemmon	Mount Lemmon Survey	·	1.5 km	MPC · JPL
749295	2014 HV_{80}	—	December 22, 2012	Haleakala	Pan-STARRS 1	·	1.3 km	MPC · JPL
749296	2014 HQ_{81}	—	November 4, 2012	Mount Lemmon	Mount Lemmon Survey	·	710 m	MPC · JPL
749297	2014 HA_{87}	—	April 23, 2014	Cerro Tololo	DECam	·	1.1 km	MPC · JPL
749298	2014 HT_{88}	—	January 10, 2013	Haleakala	Pan-STARRS 1	·	1.2 km	MPC · JPL
749299	2014 HA_{89}	—	August 9, 2007	Kitt Peak	Spacewatch	·	1.0 km	MPC · JPL
749300	2014 HF_{92}	—	October 23, 2011	Taunus	Karge, S., R. Kling	HOF	2.2 km	MPC · JPL

== 749301–749400 ==
back to top

Designation			Discovery			Properties		Ref
Permanent	Provisional	Named after	Date	Site	Discoverer(s)	Category	Diam.	Ref
749301	2014 HH_{92}	—	February 22, 2009	Kitt Peak	Spacewatch	·	1.3 km	MPC · JPL
749302	2014 HQ_{94}	—	March 3, 2009	Mount Lemmon	Mount Lemmon Survey	NEM	1.6 km	MPC · JPL
749303	2014 HB_{100}	—	December 3, 2004	Kitt Peak	Spacewatch	·	1.0 km	MPC · JPL
749304	2014 HC_{101}	—	September 18, 2011	Mount Lemmon	Mount Lemmon Survey	·	1.2 km	MPC · JPL
749305	2014 HA_{102}	—	February 3, 2009	Mount Lemmon	Mount Lemmon Survey	·	1.2 km	MPC · JPL
749306	2014 HE_{102}	—	April 23, 2014	Cerro Tololo	DECam	·	1.1 km	MPC · JPL
749307	2014 HX_{104}	—	September 21, 2011	Mount Lemmon	Mount Lemmon Survey	·	1.1 km	MPC · JPL
749308	2014 HD_{108}	—	October 28, 2011	Mount Lemmon	Mount Lemmon Survey	·	1.7 km	MPC · JPL
749309	2014 HP_{109}	—	June 15, 2010	Mount Lemmon	Mount Lemmon Survey	·	1.7 km	MPC · JPL
749310	2014 HS_{109}	—	March 27, 2014	Haleakala	Pan-STARRS 1	EUN	770 m	MPC · JPL
749311	2014 HU_{109}	—	April 23, 2014	Cerro Tololo	DECam	·	2.3 km	MPC · JPL
749312	2014 HE_{111}	—	March 17, 2005	Mount Lemmon	Mount Lemmon Survey	·	1.2 km	MPC · JPL
749313	2014 HA_{112}	—	October 20, 2012	Haleakala	Pan-STARRS 1	·	1.0 km	MPC · JPL
749314	2014 HZ_{112}	—	January 5, 2013	Mount Lemmon	Mount Lemmon Survey	NEM	1.4 km	MPC · JPL
749315	2014 HM_{113}	—	April 23, 2014	Cerro Tololo	DECam	·	1.2 km	MPC · JPL
749316	2014 HX_{113}	—	December 10, 2012	Haleakala	Pan-STARRS 1	BRG	1.0 km	MPC · JPL
749317	2014 HY_{113}	—	September 27, 2011	Mount Lemmon	Mount Lemmon Survey	HNS	810 m	MPC · JPL
749318	2014 HD_{120}	—	April 23, 2014	Cerro Tololo	DECam	·	1.2 km	MPC · JPL
749319	2014 HL_{122}	—	May 1, 2006	Mauna Kea	P. A. Wiegert	·	1.2 km	MPC · JPL
749320	2014 HP_{122}	—	April 4, 2014	Haleakala	Pan-STARRS 1	·	960 m	MPC · JPL
749321	2014 HR_{122}	—	April 24, 2014	Mount Lemmon	Mount Lemmon Survey	·	1.8 km	MPC · JPL
749322	2014 HT_{122}	—	March 25, 2014	Kitt Peak	Spacewatch	·	2.3 km	MPC · JPL
749323	2014 HM_{126}	—	October 25, 2005	Mount Lemmon	Mount Lemmon Survey	·	2.3 km	MPC · JPL
749324	2014 HX_{126}	—	April 21, 2014	Mount Lemmon	Mount Lemmon Survey	·	1.6 km	MPC · JPL
749325	2014 HK_{128}	—	April 5, 2014	Haleakala	Pan-STARRS 1	·	1.0 km	MPC · JPL
749326	2014 HY_{128}	—	January 12, 2010	Kitt Peak	Spacewatch	·	1.2 km	MPC · JPL
749327	2014 HF_{133}	—	August 12, 2004	Cerro Tololo	P. A. Wiegert	·	700 m	MPC · JPL
749328	2014 HH_{133}	—	May 16, 2010	Mount Lemmon	Mount Lemmon Survey	·	850 m	MPC · JPL
749329	2014 HJ_{133}	—	April 5, 2014	Haleakala	Pan-STARRS 1	VER	1.8 km	MPC · JPL
749330	2014 HP_{134}	—	February 16, 2010	Mount Lemmon	Mount Lemmon Survey	MAS	580 m	MPC · JPL
749331	2014 HN_{137}	—	April 21, 2014	Mount Lemmon	Mount Lemmon Survey	·	1.5 km	MPC · JPL
749332	2014 HS_{140}	—	October 27, 2005	Mount Lemmon	Mount Lemmon Survey	·	2.0 km	MPC · JPL
749333	2014 HW_{143}	—	April 2, 2014	Mount Lemmon	Mount Lemmon Survey	·	1.5 km	MPC · JPL
749334	2014 HB_{145}	—	April 23, 2014	Haleakala	Pan-STARRS 1	·	1.4 km	MPC · JPL
749335	2014 HQ_{145}	—	March 18, 2010	Mount Lemmon	Mount Lemmon Survey	·	910 m	MPC · JPL
749336	2014 HY_{145}	—	November 20, 2003	Kitt Peak	Deep Ecliptic Survey	·	1.3 km	MPC · JPL
749337	2014 HA_{147}	—	November 18, 2011	Mount Lemmon	Mount Lemmon Survey	AGN	1 km	MPC · JPL
749338	2014 HN_{147}	—	February 22, 2014	Mount Lemmon	Mount Lemmon Survey	·	1.5 km	MPC · JPL
749339	2014 HH_{148}	—	April 23, 2014	Haleakala	Pan-STARRS 1	MAS	640 m	MPC · JPL
749340	2014 HC_{149}	—	April 7, 1999	Kitt Peak	Spacewatch	·	970 m	MPC · JPL
749341	2014 HN_{149}	—	March 15, 2010	Kitt Peak	Spacewatch	MAS	560 m	MPC · JPL
749342	2014 HR_{152}	—	April 23, 2014	Cerro Tololo	DECam	·	1.2 km	MPC · JPL
749343	2014 HP_{153}	—	March 24, 2006	Kitt Peak	Spacewatch	T_{j} (2.97) · 3:2	4.5 km	MPC · JPL
749344	2014 HC_{156}	—	April 23, 2014	Cerro Tololo	DECam	·	1.2 km	MPC · JPL
749345	2014 HF_{156}	—	April 24, 2014	Cerro Tololo	DECam	KOR	1.0 km	MPC · JPL
749346	2014 HN_{156}	—	April 5, 2014	Haleakala	Pan-STARRS 1	·	1.1 km	MPC · JPL
749347	2014 HO_{156}	—	September 28, 2006	Mount Lemmon	Mount Lemmon Survey	·	2.3 km	MPC · JPL
749348	2014 HA_{157}	—	October 25, 2012	Mount Lemmon	Mount Lemmon Survey	·	560 m	MPC · JPL
749349	2014 HN_{157}	—	April 24, 2014	Mount Lemmon	Mount Lemmon Survey	·	1.8 km	MPC · JPL
749350	2014 HR_{157}	—	March 25, 2014	Kitt Peak	Spacewatch	·	1.5 km	MPC · JPL
749351	2014 HD_{158}	—	April 24, 2014	Mount Lemmon	Mount Lemmon Survey	·	1.7 km	MPC · JPL
749352	2014 HQ_{159}	—	February 28, 2014	Haleakala	Pan-STARRS 1	ADE	1.9 km	MPC · JPL
749353	2014 HF_{162}	—	April 25, 2014	Mount Lemmon	Mount Lemmon Survey	·	1.3 km	MPC · JPL
749354	2014 HO_{162}	—	December 4, 2012	Mount Lemmon	Mount Lemmon Survey	·	1.1 km	MPC · JPL
749355	2014 HY_{163}	—	October 10, 2012	Mount Lemmon	Mount Lemmon Survey	·	1.3 km	MPC · JPL
749356	2014 HO_{167}	—	April 24, 2014	Haleakala	Pan-STARRS 1	3:2	4.2 km	MPC · JPL
749357	2014 HP_{169}	—	February 28, 2014	Haleakala	Pan-STARRS 1	3:2	4.2 km	MPC · JPL
749358	2014 HD_{170}	—	October 8, 2012	Haleakala	Pan-STARRS 1	V	490 m	MPC · JPL
749359	2014 HK_{170}	—	March 24, 2014	Haleakala	Pan-STARRS 1	·	970 m	MPC · JPL
749360	2014 HO_{171}	—	March 28, 2014	Mount Lemmon	Mount Lemmon Survey	·	1.3 km	MPC · JPL
749361	2014 HV_{171}	—	April 25, 2014	Mount Lemmon	Mount Lemmon Survey	·	1.7 km	MPC · JPL
749362	2014 HJ_{175}	—	June 21, 2010	Mount Lemmon	Mount Lemmon Survey	·	1.6 km	MPC · JPL
749363	2014 HG_{177}	—	May 5, 2010	Catalina	CSS	·	1.2 km	MPC · JPL
749364	2014 HL_{185}	—	February 24, 2006	Kitt Peak	Spacewatch	·	1.0 km	MPC · JPL
749365	2014 HY_{185}	—	May 25, 2006	Mauna Kea	P. A. Wiegert	·	900 m	MPC · JPL
749366	2014 HG_{203}	—	April 30, 2014	Haleakala	Pan-STARRS 1	·	1.4 km	MPC · JPL
749367	2014 HJ_{204}	—	April 30, 2014	Haleakala	Pan-STARRS 1	EUN	940 m	MPC · JPL
749368	2014 HZ_{205}	—	April 29, 2014	Haleakala	Pan-STARRS 1	EUN	790 m	MPC · JPL
749369	2014 HJ_{206}	—	October 20, 2008	Mount Lemmon	Mount Lemmon Survey	·	960 m	MPC · JPL
749370	2014 HR_{206}	—	April 30, 2014	Haleakala	Pan-STARRS 1	HNS	1.0 km	MPC · JPL
749371	2014 HC_{207}	—	April 30, 2014	Haleakala	Pan-STARRS 1	·	1.1 km	MPC · JPL
749372	2014 HQ_{207}	—	April 30, 2014	Haleakala	Pan-STARRS 1	·	1.3 km	MPC · JPL
749373	2014 HG_{211}	—	April 30, 2014	Haleakala	Pan-STARRS 1	·	690 m	MPC · JPL
749374	2014 HC_{212}	—	April 20, 2014	Kitt Peak	Spacewatch	·	1.1 km	MPC · JPL
749375	2014 HN_{212}	—	April 30, 2014	Haleakala	Pan-STARRS 1	HNS	1.0 km	MPC · JPL
749376	2014 HQ_{212}	—	January 21, 2009	Mount Lemmon	Mount Lemmon Survey	·	1.3 km	MPC · JPL
749377	2014 HX_{212}	—	April 23, 2014	Mount Lemmon	Mount Lemmon Survey	·	1 km	MPC · JPL
749378	2014 HY_{212}	—	October 12, 2016	Mount Lemmon	Mount Lemmon Survey	BAR	980 m	MPC · JPL
749379	2014 HR_{213}	—	April 30, 2014	Haleakala	Pan-STARRS 1	·	510 m	MPC · JPL
749380	2014 HW_{213}	—	March 29, 2014	Kitt Peak	Spacewatch	·	1.3 km	MPC · JPL
749381	2014 HJ_{220}	—	April 30, 2014	Haleakala	Pan-STARRS 1	·	1.1 km	MPC · JPL
749382	2014 HV_{220}	—	April 29, 2014	Haleakala	Pan-STARRS 1	·	1.2 km	MPC · JPL
749383	2014 HD_{221}	—	April 30, 2014	Haleakala	Pan-STARRS 1	·	1.6 km	MPC · JPL
749384	2014 HU_{221}	—	April 30, 2014	Haleakala	Pan-STARRS 1	·	840 m	MPC · JPL
749385	2014 HZ_{221}	—	April 29, 2014	Haleakala	Pan-STARRS 1	·	1.5 km	MPC · JPL
749386	2014 HA_{222}	—	April 24, 2014	Mount Lemmon	Mount Lemmon Survey	GEF	980 m	MPC · JPL
749387	2014 HH_{222}	—	April 29, 2014	Haleakala	Pan-STARRS 1	·	1.3 km	MPC · JPL
749388	2014 HO_{225}	—	April 24, 2014	Mount Lemmon	Mount Lemmon Survey	·	1.3 km	MPC · JPL
749389	2014 HV_{225}	—	April 25, 2014	Mount Lemmon	Mount Lemmon Survey	HNS	840 m	MPC · JPL
749390	2014 HO_{226}	—	April 30, 2014	Haleakala	Pan-STARRS 1	·	1.9 km	MPC · JPL
749391	2014 HR_{226}	—	April 29, 2014	Haleakala	Pan-STARRS 1	·	1.5 km	MPC · JPL
749392	2014 HE_{234}	—	December 23, 2012	Haleakala	Pan-STARRS 1	·	610 m	MPC · JPL
749393	2014 HV_{234}	—	April 30, 2014	Haleakala	Pan-STARRS 1	·	1.4 km	MPC · JPL
749394	2014 HR_{235}	—	April 21, 2014	Mount Lemmon	Mount Lemmon Survey	·	1.4 km	MPC · JPL
749395	2014 HU_{235}	—	April 20, 2014	Mount Lemmon	Mount Lemmon Survey	EUN	890 m	MPC · JPL
749396	2014 HM_{236}	—	April 29, 2014	Haleakala	Pan-STARRS 1	·	1.3 km	MPC · JPL
749397	2014 HX_{242}	—	December 13, 2012	Mount Lemmon	Mount Lemmon Survey	·	650 m	MPC · JPL
749398	2014 JN_{4}	—	April 5, 2014	Haleakala	Pan-STARRS 1	AGN	980 m	MPC · JPL
749399	2014 JN_{7}	—	October 10, 2007	Mount Lemmon	Mount Lemmon Survey	·	1.5 km	MPC · JPL
749400	2014 JN_{8}	—	March 24, 2009	Mount Lemmon	Mount Lemmon Survey	·	1.7 km	MPC · JPL

== 749401–749500 ==
back to top

Designation			Discovery			Properties		Ref
Permanent	Provisional	Named after	Date	Site	Discoverer(s)	Category	Diam.	Ref
749401	2014 JD_{10}	—	May 3, 2014	Mount Lemmon	Mount Lemmon Survey	·	1.1 km	MPC · JPL
749402	2014 JL_{11}	—	November 3, 2011	Kitt Peak	Spacewatch	·	1.3 km	MPC · JPL
749403	2014 JC_{13}	—	March 3, 2009	Kitt Peak	Spacewatch	·	1.4 km	MPC · JPL
749404	2014 JR_{13}	—	May 3, 2014	Mount Lemmon	Mount Lemmon Survey	·	1.6 km	MPC · JPL
749405	2014 JH_{14}	—	May 3, 2014	Mount Lemmon	Mount Lemmon Survey	·	550 m	MPC · JPL
749406	2014 JO_{16}	—	April 8, 2014	Haleakala	Pan-STARRS 1	·	1.2 km	MPC · JPL
749407	2014 JO_{17}	—	March 22, 2014	Kitt Peak	Spacewatch	·	1.1 km	MPC · JPL
749408	2014 JH_{19}	—	March 28, 2014	Mount Lemmon	Mount Lemmon Survey	·	1.2 km	MPC · JPL
749409	2014 JO_{20}	—	April 2, 2014	Mount Lemmon	Mount Lemmon Survey	·	1.2 km	MPC · JPL
749410	2014 JO_{23}	—	March 20, 2010	Kitt Peak	Spacewatch	·	980 m	MPC · JPL
749411	2014 JZ_{26}	—	February 1, 2009	Kitt Peak	Spacewatch	·	1.4 km	MPC · JPL
749412	2014 JX_{27}	—	January 3, 2013	Mount Lemmon	Mount Lemmon Survey	·	1.7 km	MPC · JPL
749413	2014 JA_{28}	—	April 24, 2014	Haleakala	Pan-STARRS 1	·	1.3 km	MPC · JPL
749414	2014 JQ_{28}	—	May 5, 2014	Mount Lemmon	Mount Lemmon Survey	·	1.1 km	MPC · JPL
749415	2014 JK_{34}	—	May 4, 2014	Mount Lemmon	Mount Lemmon Survey	·	1.7 km	MPC · JPL
749416	2014 JW_{34}	—	May 4, 2014	Mount Lemmon	Mount Lemmon Survey	·	1.7 km	MPC · JPL
749417	2014 JC_{35}	—	September 3, 2010	Mount Lemmon	Mount Lemmon Survey	·	1.5 km	MPC · JPL
749418	2014 JA_{40}	—	January 22, 2013	Mount Lemmon	Mount Lemmon Survey	·	1.6 km	MPC · JPL
749419	2014 JE_{40}	—	December 31, 2007	Mount Lemmon	Mount Lemmon Survey	·	550 m	MPC · JPL
749420	2014 JR_{41}	—	April 29, 2014	Tenerife	ESA OGS	·	1.8 km	MPC · JPL
749421	2014 JG_{42}	—	May 5, 2014	Mount Lemmon	Mount Lemmon Survey	EUN	840 m	MPC · JPL
749422	2014 JA_{44}	—	May 4, 2014	Mount Lemmon	Mount Lemmon Survey	·	880 m	MPC · JPL
749423	2014 JE_{45}	—	February 15, 2010	Kitt Peak	Spacewatch	·	900 m	MPC · JPL
749424	2014 JN_{45}	—	September 21, 2011	Haleakala	Pan-STARRS 1	·	940 m	MPC · JPL
749425	2014 JV_{45}	—	April 23, 2014	Haleakala	Pan-STARRS 1	·	1.2 km	MPC · JPL
749426	2014 JF_{47}	—	October 16, 2006	Kitt Peak	Spacewatch	·	1.4 km	MPC · JPL
749427	2014 JL_{49}	—	May 4, 2014	Kitt Peak	Spacewatch	·	1.5 km	MPC · JPL
749428	2014 JT_{53}	—	April 22, 2014	Kitt Peak	Spacewatch	MIS	2.0 km	MPC · JPL
749429	2014 JV_{53}	—	May 8, 2014	Haleakala	Pan-STARRS 1	·	3.0 km	MPC · JPL
749430	2014 JA_{60}	—	May 4, 2014	Haleakala	Pan-STARRS 1	·	550 m	MPC · JPL
749431	2014 JK_{61}	—	May 7, 2014	Haleakala	Pan-STARRS 1	·	980 m	MPC · JPL
749432	2014 JH_{64}	—	May 4, 2014	Haleakala	Pan-STARRS 1	NYS	750 m	MPC · JPL
749433	2014 JK_{64}	—	May 8, 2014	Haleakala	Pan-STARRS 1	·	1.7 km	MPC · JPL
749434	2014 JN_{67}	—	May 23, 2003	Kitt Peak	Spacewatch	·	830 m	MPC · JPL
749435	2014 JG_{68}	—	May 1, 2014	Mount Lemmon	Mount Lemmon Survey	PHO	700 m	MPC · JPL
749436	2014 JH_{68}	—	May 1, 2014	Mount Lemmon	Mount Lemmon Survey	·	1.4 km	MPC · JPL
749437	2014 JN_{68}	—	May 8, 2014	Haleakala	Pan-STARRS 1	·	960 m	MPC · JPL
749438	2014 JY_{68}	—	April 30, 2014	Haleakala	Pan-STARRS 1	EUN	840 m	MPC · JPL
749439	2014 JB_{72}	—	March 12, 2014	Haleakala	Pan-STARRS 1	·	1.1 km	MPC · JPL
749440	2014 JX_{76}	—	December 31, 2012	Haleakala	Pan-STARRS 1	H	470 m	MPC · JPL
749441	2014 JV_{82}	—	May 5, 2014	Mount Lemmon	Mount Lemmon Survey	(18466)	1.6 km	MPC · JPL
749442	2014 JN_{86}	—	May 6, 2014	Haleakala	Pan-STARRS 1	·	1.2 km	MPC · JPL
749443	2014 JV_{87}	—	May 3, 2014	Mount Lemmon	Mount Lemmon Survey	NEM	1.6 km	MPC · JPL
749444	2014 JB_{88}	—	May 4, 2014	Mount Lemmon	Mount Lemmon Survey	·	1.2 km	MPC · JPL
749445	2014 JC_{88}	—	May 4, 2014	Haleakala	Pan-STARRS 1	MAR	840 m	MPC · JPL
749446	2014 JV_{88}	—	September 24, 2011	Haleakala	Pan-STARRS 1	·	1.6 km	MPC · JPL
749447	2014 JY_{88}	—	July 18, 2006	Mount Lemmon	Mount Lemmon Survey	·	1.4 km	MPC · JPL
749448	2014 JQ_{89}	—	May 6, 2014	Haleakala	Pan-STARRS 1	·	950 m	MPC · JPL
749449	2014 JG_{90}	—	September 29, 2011	Mount Lemmon	Mount Lemmon Survey	·	1.1 km	MPC · JPL
749450	2014 JG_{93}	—	May 9, 2014	Haleakala	Pan-STARRS 1	·	2.1 km	MPC · JPL
749451	2014 JK_{93}	—	May 7, 2014	Haleakala	Pan-STARRS 1	·	1.2 km	MPC · JPL
749452	2014 JN_{94}	—	May 7, 2014	Haleakala	Pan-STARRS 1	·	1.5 km	MPC · JPL
749453	2014 JZ_{98}	—	May 7, 2014	Haleakala	Pan-STARRS 1	·	1.4 km	MPC · JPL
749454	2014 JP_{99}	—	May 7, 2014	Haleakala	Pan-STARRS 1	·	1.4 km	MPC · JPL
749455	2014 JL_{106}	—	May 7, 2014	Haleakala	Pan-STARRS 1	EUN	1.1 km	MPC · JPL
749456	2014 JP_{107}	—	May 7, 2014	Haleakala	Pan-STARRS 1	·	1.4 km	MPC · JPL
749457	2014 JS_{107}	—	May 7, 2014	Haleakala	Pan-STARRS 1	·	1.4 km	MPC · JPL
749458	2014 JA_{121}	—	May 8, 2014	Haleakala	Pan-STARRS 1	(5)	960 m	MPC · JPL
749459	2014 JH_{130}	—	May 3, 2014	Mount Lemmon	Mount Lemmon Survey	·	1.5 km	MPC · JPL
749460	2014 JN_{133}	—	February 4, 2005	Mount Lemmon	Mount Lemmon Survey	·	950 m	MPC · JPL
749461	2014 KC	—	April 6, 2014	Mount Lemmon	Mount Lemmon Survey	H	510 m	MPC · JPL
749462	2014 KW	—	June 14, 2005	Kitt Peak	Spacewatch	·	1.4 km	MPC · JPL
749463	2014 KO_{1}	—	April 5, 2014	Haleakala	Pan-STARRS 1	·	1.9 km	MPC · JPL
749464	2014 KJ_{3}	—	February 28, 2014	Haleakala	Pan-STARRS 1	·	1.6 km	MPC · JPL
749465	2014 KY_{3}	—	November 27, 2011	Mount Lemmon	Mount Lemmon Survey	GAL	1.3 km	MPC · JPL
749466	2014 KF_{4}	—	May 22, 2014	Mount Lemmon	Mount Lemmon Survey	H	430 m	MPC · JPL
749467	2014 KE_{5}	—	April 24, 2014	Catalina	CSS	·	1.7 km	MPC · JPL
749468	2014 KV_{5}	—	April 29, 2014	Haleakala	Pan-STARRS 1	·	1.1 km	MPC · JPL
749469	2014 KR_{7}	—	March 18, 2010	Mount Lemmon	Mount Lemmon Survey	·	950 m	MPC · JPL
749470	2014 KY_{12}	—	May 21, 2014	Haleakala	Pan-STARRS 1	THM	2.2 km	MPC · JPL
749471	2014 KW_{14}	—	May 21, 2014	Haleakala	Pan-STARRS 1	·	1.6 km	MPC · JPL
749472	2014 KV_{16}	—	April 30, 2014	Haleakala	Pan-STARRS 1	·	1.4 km	MPC · JPL
749473	2014 KG_{21}	—	January 3, 2011	Mount Lemmon	Mount Lemmon Survey	H	400 m	MPC · JPL
749474	2014 KA_{23}	—	March 22, 2014	Kitt Peak	Spacewatch	EUN	840 m	MPC · JPL
749475	2014 KX_{25}	—	May 4, 2014	Mount Lemmon	Mount Lemmon Survey	EUN	1.0 km	MPC · JPL
749476	2014 KQ_{26}	—	February 28, 2014	Haleakala	Pan-STARRS 1	ERI	1.3 km	MPC · JPL
749477	2014 KK_{28}	—	April 5, 2014	Haleakala	Pan-STARRS 1	·	1.4 km	MPC · JPL
749478	2014 KM_{28}	—	March 25, 2014	Mount Lemmon	Mount Lemmon Survey	·	2.9 km	MPC · JPL
749479	2014 KK_{29}	—	March 12, 2010	Kitt Peak	Spacewatch	NYS	890 m	MPC · JPL
749480	2014 KW_{31}	—	May 21, 2014	Mount Lemmon	Mount Lemmon Survey	HOF	2.0 km	MPC · JPL
749481	2014 KZ_{31}	—	November 1, 2006	Kitt Peak	Spacewatch	·	1.5 km	MPC · JPL
749482	2014 KS_{35}	—	May 4, 2014	Mount Lemmon	Mount Lemmon Survey	·	1.7 km	MPC · JPL
749483	2014 KM_{36}	—	May 7, 2010	Mount Lemmon	Mount Lemmon Survey	·	1.4 km	MPC · JPL
749484	2014 KE_{41}	—	May 20, 2014	Haleakala	Pan-STARRS 1	·	1.3 km	MPC · JPL
749485	2014 KL_{42}	—	April 10, 2014	Haleakala	Pan-STARRS 1	·	1.6 km	MPC · JPL
749486	2014 KQ_{43}	—	May 2, 2014	Mount Lemmon	Mount Lemmon Survey	TIN	790 m	MPC · JPL
749487	2014 KN_{44}	—	May 8, 2014	Haleakala	Pan-STARRS 1	TIN	780 m	MPC · JPL
749488	2014 KO_{45}	—	May 26, 2014	Mount Lemmon	Mount Lemmon Survey	H	450 m	MPC · JPL
749489	2014 KC_{47}	—	September 28, 2011	Kitt Peak	Spacewatch	·	1.2 km	MPC · JPL
749490	2014 KU_{50}	—	May 21, 2014	Haleakala	Pan-STARRS 1	·	1.3 km	MPC · JPL
749491	2014 KJ_{51}	—	April 5, 2014	Haleakala	Pan-STARRS 1	·	1.9 km	MPC · JPL
749492	2014 KD_{59}	—	October 7, 2010	Mount Lemmon	Mount Lemmon Survey	·	1.7 km	MPC · JPL
749493	2014 KO_{60}	—	May 24, 2014	Haleakala	Pan-STARRS 1	·	1.9 km	MPC · JPL
749494	2014 KA_{61}	—	May 24, 2014	Haleakala	Pan-STARRS 1	·	1.7 km	MPC · JPL
749495	2014 KB_{63}	—	May 21, 2014	Haleakala	Pan-STARRS 1	·	1.4 km	MPC · JPL
749496	2014 KB_{70}	—	May 23, 2014	Haleakala	Pan-STARRS 1	·	1.3 km	MPC · JPL
749497	2014 KJ_{70}	—	May 7, 2014	Haleakala	Pan-STARRS 1	·	1.6 km	MPC · JPL
749498	2014 KW_{70}	—	May 7, 2014	Haleakala	Pan-STARRS 1	·	1.5 km	MPC · JPL
749499	2014 KB_{71}	—	May 23, 2014	Haleakala	Pan-STARRS 1	·	1.3 km	MPC · JPL
749500	2014 KK_{73}	—	May 7, 2014	Haleakala	Pan-STARRS 1	·	1.4 km	MPC · JPL

== 749501–749600 ==
back to top

Designation			Discovery			Properties		Ref
Permanent	Provisional	Named after	Date	Site	Discoverer(s)	Category	Diam.	Ref
749501	2014 KY_{73}	—	September 4, 2011	Haleakala	Pan-STARRS 1	EUN	1.1 km	MPC · JPL
749502	2014 KG_{78}	—	April 5, 2014	Haleakala	Pan-STARRS 1	HNS	840 m	MPC · JPL
749503	2014 KE_{80}	—	May 21, 2014	Kitt Peak	Spacewatch	·	1.1 km	MPC · JPL
749504	2014 KU_{82}	—	May 21, 2014	Haleakala	Pan-STARRS 1	GEF	960 m	MPC · JPL
749505	2014 KV_{85}	—	April 7, 2005	Palomar	NEAT	·	1.6 km	MPC · JPL
749506	2014 KK_{87}	—	April 8, 2014	Haleakala	Pan-STARRS 1	·	1.5 km	MPC · JPL
749507	2014 KP_{87}	—	January 13, 2013	Tenerife	ESA OGS	·	1.9 km	MPC · JPL
749508	2014 KQ_{88}	—	April 22, 2014	Kitt Peak	Spacewatch	·	1.4 km	MPC · JPL
749509	2014 KQ_{93}	—	April 4, 2014	Haleakala	Pan-STARRS 1	·	1.6 km	MPC · JPL
749510	2014 KA_{95}	—	October 23, 2011	Mount Lemmon	Mount Lemmon Survey	·	890 m	MPC · JPL
749511	2014 KS_{100}	—	May 7, 2014	Haleakala	Pan-STARRS 1	·	1.4 km	MPC · JPL
749512	2014 KH_{101}	—	May 26, 2014	Haleakala	Pan-STARRS 1	·	1.5 km	MPC · JPL
749513	2014 KY_{102}	—	July 17, 2002	Palomar	NEAT	·	890 m	MPC · JPL
749514	2014 KW_{105}	—	May 7, 2014	Haleakala	Pan-STARRS 1	·	1.8 km	MPC · JPL
749515	2014 KE_{107}	—	May 21, 2014	Mount Lemmon	Mount Lemmon Survey	EUN	960 m	MPC · JPL
749516	2014 KM_{107}	—	October 24, 2011	Kitt Peak	Spacewatch	·	1.4 km	MPC · JPL
749517	2014 KR_{107}	—	May 21, 2014	Haleakala	Pan-STARRS 1	EUN	1.0 km	MPC · JPL
749518	2014 KB_{108}	—	May 21, 2014	Haleakala	Pan-STARRS 1	·	2.0 km	MPC · JPL
749519	2014 KZ_{108}	—	May 23, 2014	Haleakala	Pan-STARRS 1	·	2.0 km	MPC · JPL
749520	2014 KV_{111}	—	May 27, 2014	Haleakala	Pan-STARRS 1	·	1.1 km	MPC · JPL
749521	2014 KA_{112}	—	May 28, 2014	Mount Lemmon	Mount Lemmon Survey	·	1.8 km	MPC · JPL
749522	2014 KB_{113}	—	December 4, 2007	Catalina	CSS	EUN	1.2 km	MPC · JPL
749523	2014 KL_{113}	—	May 21, 2014	Haleakala	Pan-STARRS 1	·	1.7 km	MPC · JPL
749524	2014 KM_{115}	—	May 23, 2014	Haleakala	Pan-STARRS 1	HNS	960 m	MPC · JPL
749525	2014 KB_{118}	—	December 6, 2015	Haleakala	Pan-STARRS 1	·	570 m	MPC · JPL
749526	2014 KU_{128}	—	May 25, 2014	Haleakala	Pan-STARRS 1	(5)	970 m	MPC · JPL
749527	2014 KH_{129}	—	May 24, 2014	Haleakala	Pan-STARRS 1	WIT	740 m	MPC · JPL
749528	2014 KR_{131}	—	May 23, 2014	Haleakala	Pan-STARRS 1	·	1.8 km	MPC · JPL
749529	2014 KW_{131}	—	May 23, 2014	Haleakala	Pan-STARRS 1	·	1.5 km	MPC · JPL
749530	2014 KU_{132}	—	May 20, 2014	Haleakala	Pan-STARRS 1	·	1.4 km	MPC · JPL
749531	2014 KK_{133}	—	May 27, 2014	Haleakala	Pan-STARRS 1	·	1.6 km	MPC · JPL
749532	2014 KQ_{133}	—	May 27, 2014	Haleakala	Pan-STARRS 1	EUN	930 m	MPC · JPL
749533	2014 LY_{4}	—	September 28, 2011	Mount Lemmon	Mount Lemmon Survey	·	1.4 km	MPC · JPL
749534	2014 LG_{5}	—	May 22, 2014	Mount Lemmon	Mount Lemmon Survey	JUN	1 km	MPC · JPL
749535	2014 LE_{9}	—	May 21, 2014	Mount Lemmon	Mount Lemmon Survey	·	1.4 km	MPC · JPL
749536	2014 LQ_{12}	—	May 28, 2014	Haleakala	Pan-STARRS 1	·	930 m	MPC · JPL
749537	2014 LT_{12}	—	May 21, 2014	Haleakala	Pan-STARRS 1	·	1.5 km	MPC · JPL
749538	2014 LU_{22}	—	June 4, 2014	Haleakala	Pan-STARRS 1	EUN	960 m	MPC · JPL
749539	2014 LC_{24}	—	June 6, 2014	Haleakala	Pan-STARRS 1	TIN	1.0 km	MPC · JPL
749540	2014 LU_{25}	—	September 26, 2012	Mount Lemmon	Mount Lemmon Survey	H	380 m	MPC · JPL
749541	2014 LE_{27}	—	June 4, 2014	Piszkés-tető	K. Sárneczky, S. Kürti	·	1.2 km	MPC · JPL
749542	2014 LE_{32}	—	October 7, 2007	Mount Lemmon	Mount Lemmon Survey	KON	1.9 km	MPC · JPL
749543	2014 LG_{36}	—	June 3, 2014	Haleakala	Pan-STARRS 1	·	670 m	MPC · JPL
749544	2014 LZ_{36}	—	June 2, 2014	Haleakala	Pan-STARRS 1	·	3.2 km	MPC · JPL
749545	2014 MT_{1}	—	September 30, 2011	Mount Lemmon	Mount Lemmon Survey	·	1.1 km	MPC · JPL
749546	2014 MP_{8}	—	August 31, 2010	Zelenchukskaya Stn	T. V. Krjačko, Satovski, B.	·	1.3 km	MPC · JPL
749547	2014 MT_{8}	—	May 7, 2014	Haleakala	Pan-STARRS 1	TIN	940 m	MPC · JPL
749548	2014 MM_{9}	—	June 5, 2014	Haleakala	Pan-STARRS 1	·	1.0 km	MPC · JPL
749549	2014 MM_{10}	—	May 9, 2014	Mount Lemmon	Mount Lemmon Survey	MAR	800 m	MPC · JPL
749550	2014 MV_{10}	—	May 27, 2014	Mount Lemmon	Mount Lemmon Survey	·	540 m	MPC · JPL
749551	2014 MJ_{15}	—	May 23, 2014	Haleakala	Pan-STARRS 1	·	1.2 km	MPC · JPL
749552	2014 MJ_{18}	—	December 26, 2006	Catalina	CSS	·	1.9 km	MPC · JPL
749553	2014 MQ_{19}	—	June 5, 2014	Haleakala	Pan-STARRS 1	·	2.3 km	MPC · JPL
749554	2014 MY_{25}	—	January 19, 2012	Kitt Peak	Spacewatch	·	2.8 km	MPC · JPL
749555	2014 MD_{29}	—	May 28, 2014	Haleakala	Pan-STARRS 1	·	1.3 km	MPC · JPL
749556	2014 MP_{29}	—	March 18, 2010	Mount Lemmon	Mount Lemmon Survey	NYS	910 m	MPC · JPL
749557	2014 MO_{30}	—	May 6, 2014	Haleakala	Pan-STARRS 1	·	1.7 km	MPC · JPL
749558	2014 MV_{32}	—	May 28, 2014	Mount Lemmon	Mount Lemmon Survey	EUN	980 m	MPC · JPL
749559	2014 MK_{33}	—	September 24, 2011	Haleakala	Pan-STARRS 1	·	1.5 km	MPC · JPL
749560	2014 ML_{36}	—	May 4, 2014	Kitt Peak	Spacewatch	·	1.2 km	MPC · JPL
749561	2014 ME_{38}	—	August 28, 2003	Haleakala	NEAT	·	2.9 km	MPC · JPL
749562	2014 MP_{38}	—	February 14, 2013	Haleakala	Pan-STARRS 1	·	930 m	MPC · JPL
749563	2014 MR_{40}	—	December 16, 2012	Tenerife	ESA OGS	H	540 m	MPC · JPL
749564	2014 MJ_{41}	—	January 17, 2013	Haleakala	Pan-STARRS 1	·	1.0 km	MPC · JPL
749565	2014 MH_{44}	—	May 30, 2014	Haleakala	Pan-STARRS 1	·	1.8 km	MPC · JPL
749566	2014 MG_{49}	—	May 19, 2006	Mount Lemmon	Mount Lemmon Survey	NYS	950 m	MPC · JPL
749567	2014 MT_{56}	—	December 18, 2007	Mount Lemmon	Mount Lemmon Survey	HNS	950 m	MPC · JPL
749568	2014 MG_{58}	—	November 2, 2010	Mount Lemmon	Mount Lemmon Survey	MRX	910 m	MPC · JPL
749569	2014 ME_{59}	—	September 26, 2005	Kitt Peak	Spacewatch	·	1.6 km	MPC · JPL
749570	2014 MQ_{59}	—	February 14, 2013	Haleakala	Pan-STARRS 1	·	1.4 km	MPC · JPL
749571	2014 MT_{60}	—	June 24, 2014	Mount Lemmon	Mount Lemmon Survey	·	1.8 km	MPC · JPL
749572	2014 MX_{60}	—	May 7, 2014	Haleakala	Pan-STARRS 1	BRG	1.2 km	MPC · JPL
749573	2014 MQ_{61}	—	June 24, 2014	Mount Lemmon	Mount Lemmon Survey	·	1.4 km	MPC · JPL
749574	2014 MR_{69}	—	May 6, 2014	Haleakala	Pan-STARRS 1	·	720 m	MPC · JPL
749575	2014 MF_{74}	—	June 21, 2014	Haleakala	Pan-STARRS 1	·	1.7 km	MPC · JPL
749576	2014 MC_{75}	—	March 5, 2013	Haleakala	Pan-STARRS 1	EUN	1.1 km	MPC · JPL
749577	2014 MH_{75}	—	August 1, 2009	Kitt Peak	Spacewatch	·	1.7 km	MPC · JPL
749578	2014 MJ_{76}	—	February 9, 2008	Mount Lemmon	Mount Lemmon Survey	·	1.6 km	MPC · JPL
749579	2014 MG_{78}	—	June 30, 2014	Haleakala	Pan-STARRS 1	·	1.6 km	MPC · JPL
749580	2014 MM_{78}	—	January 11, 2008	Mount Lemmon	Mount Lemmon Survey	·	1.0 km	MPC · JPL
749581	2014 MP_{78}	—	October 30, 2010	Mount Lemmon	Mount Lemmon Survey	·	1.9 km	MPC · JPL
749582	2014 MV_{78}	—	June 24, 2014	Haleakala	Pan-STARRS 1	HNS	910 m	MPC · JPL
749583	2014 MB_{81}	—	June 28, 2014	Haleakala	Pan-STARRS 1	H	370 m	MPC · JPL
749584	2014 MQ_{81}	—	June 27, 2014	Haleakala	Pan-STARRS 1	·	1.9 km	MPC · JPL
749585	2014 MT_{82}	—	June 30, 2014	Haleakala	Pan-STARRS 1	·	1.5 km	MPC · JPL
749586	2014 MZ_{87}	—	August 24, 2011	Haleakala	Pan-STARRS 1	·	480 m	MPC · JPL
749587	2014 MT_{88}	—	June 26, 2014	Kitt Peak	Spacewatch	·	570 m	MPC · JPL
749588	2014 MQ_{92}	—	June 27, 2014	Haleakala	Pan-STARRS 1	·	1.5 km	MPC · JPL
749589	2014 NS	—	May 6, 2014	Haleakala	Pan-STARRS 1	·	1.8 km	MPC · JPL
749590	2014 NC_{1}	—	July 1, 2014	Mount Lemmon	Mount Lemmon Survey	·	1.1 km	MPC · JPL
749591	2014 NK_{1}	—	November 8, 2010	Mount Lemmon	Mount Lemmon Survey	·	2.1 km	MPC · JPL
749592	2014 NO_{1}	—	November 8, 2007	Kitt Peak	Spacewatch	·	1.5 km	MPC · JPL
749593	2014 NE_{3}	—	July 3, 2014	Haleakala	Pan-STARRS 1	APO	230 m	MPC · JPL
749594	2014 NP_{5}	—	July 1, 2014	Haleakala	Pan-STARRS 1	·	1.7 km	MPC · JPL
749595	2014 NR_{5}	—	July 1, 2014	Haleakala	Pan-STARRS 1	·	470 m	MPC · JPL
749596	2014 NL_{7}	—	June 23, 2014	Mount Lemmon	Mount Lemmon Survey	·	1.6 km	MPC · JPL
749597	2014 NE_{13}	—	April 14, 2010	Kitt Peak	Spacewatch	·	840 m	MPC · JPL
749598	2014 NR_{16}	—	May 21, 2014	Haleakala	Pan-STARRS 1	·	1.8 km	MPC · JPL
749599	2014 NJ_{17}	—	May 5, 2014	Mount Lemmon	Mount Lemmon Survey	HNS	1.1 km	MPC · JPL
749600	2014 NB_{19}	—	September 2, 2010	Mount Lemmon	Mount Lemmon Survey	·	1.9 km	MPC · JPL

== 749601–749700 ==
back to top

Designation			Discovery			Properties		Ref
Permanent	Provisional	Named after	Date	Site	Discoverer(s)	Category	Diam.	Ref
749601	2014 ND_{19}	—	May 7, 2014	Mount Lemmon	Mount Lemmon Survey	TIN	610 m	MPC · JPL
749602	2014 NB_{21}	—	March 19, 2013	Haleakala	Pan-STARRS 1	·	1.4 km	MPC · JPL
749603	2014 NG_{21}	—	September 18, 2010	Mount Lemmon	Mount Lemmon Survey	EUN	990 m	MPC · JPL
749604	2014 NE_{22}	—	November 2, 2010	Mount Lemmon	Mount Lemmon Survey	GEF	820 m	MPC · JPL
749605	2014 NP_{29}	—	June 2, 2014	Haleakala	Pan-STARRS 1	·	1.8 km	MPC · JPL
749606	2014 NN_{31}	—	October 20, 2007	Mount Lemmon	Mount Lemmon Survey	MAS	670 m	MPC · JPL
749607	2014 NV_{33}	—	June 22, 2014	Haleakala	Pan-STARRS 1	·	1.7 km	MPC · JPL
749608	2014 NE_{34}	—	April 5, 2008	Kitt Peak	Spacewatch	·	1.8 km	MPC · JPL
749609	2014 NG_{37}	—	October 1, 2011	Kitt Peak	Spacewatch	·	520 m	MPC · JPL
749610	2014 NY_{38}	—	June 2, 2014	Haleakala	Pan-STARRS 1	·	540 m	MPC · JPL
749611	2014 NL_{41}	—	June 15, 2005	Kitt Peak	Spacewatch	JUN	670 m	MPC · JPL
749612	2014 NR_{43}	—	September 18, 2010	Mount Lemmon	Mount Lemmon Survey	·	1.8 km	MPC · JPL
749613	2014 NS_{44}	—	July 3, 2014	Haleakala	Pan-STARRS 1	·	1.6 km	MPC · JPL
749614	2014 NF_{45}	—	June 3, 2014	Haleakala	Pan-STARRS 1	BRA	1.0 km	MPC · JPL
749615	2014 NO_{45}	—	October 17, 2010	Mount Lemmon	Mount Lemmon Survey	·	2.0 km	MPC · JPL
749616	2014 NQ_{46}	—	May 8, 2014	Haleakala	Pan-STARRS 1	TIN	820 m	MPC · JPL
749617	2014 NZ_{48}	—	July 3, 2014	Haleakala	Pan-STARRS 1	·	1.5 km	MPC · JPL
749618	2014 NT_{49}	—	July 3, 2014	Haleakala	Pan-STARRS 1	TIR	2.1 km	MPC · JPL
749619	2014 NC_{50}	—	June 26, 2014	Haleakala	Pan-STARRS 1	·	1.8 km	MPC · JPL
749620	2014 NN_{50}	—	June 12, 2005	Kitt Peak	Spacewatch	EUN	1.1 km	MPC · JPL
749621	2014 NM_{55}	—	July 6, 2014	Haleakala	Pan-STARRS 1	·	3.8 km	MPC · JPL
749622	2014 NY_{56}	—	June 28, 2014	Haleakala	Pan-STARRS 1	·	2.1 km	MPC · JPL
749623	2014 NF_{57}	—	October 31, 2010	Mount Lemmon	Mount Lemmon Survey	·	1.5 km	MPC · JPL
749624	2014 NL_{57}	—	August 14, 2001	Palomar	NEAT	·	460 m	MPC · JPL
749625	2014 NC_{58}	—	June 28, 2014	Haleakala	Pan-STARRS 1	·	1.4 km	MPC · JPL
749626	2014 NQ_{61}	—	September 14, 2010	Kitt Peak	Spacewatch	·	1.6 km	MPC · JPL
749627	2014 NW_{62}	—	October 3, 2006	Mount Lemmon	Mount Lemmon Survey	·	1.1 km	MPC · JPL
749628	2014 NB_{63}	—	October 3, 2006	Mount Lemmon	Mount Lemmon Survey	·	1.3 km	MPC · JPL
749629	2014 NF_{64}	—	July 2, 2014	Haleakala	Pan-STARRS 1	T_{j} (2.85) · APO +1km	870 m	MPC · JPL
749630	2014 NH_{68}	—	July 7, 2014	Haleakala	Pan-STARRS 1	·	1.6 km	MPC · JPL
749631	2014 NV_{69}	—	July 1, 2014	Haleakala	Pan-STARRS 1	·	2.4 km	MPC · JPL
749632	2014 NA_{71}	—	October 3, 2010	Kitt Peak	Spacewatch	·	1.5 km	MPC · JPL
749633	2014 NR_{71}	—	September 30, 2005	Kitt Peak	Spacewatch	·	1.5 km	MPC · JPL
749634	2014 NU_{72}	—	March 5, 2013	Mount Lemmon	Mount Lemmon Survey	·	1.8 km	MPC · JPL
749635	2014 NX_{74}	—	July 8, 2014	Haleakala	Pan-STARRS 1	·	620 m	MPC · JPL
749636	2014 NY_{74}	—	July 7, 2014	Haleakala	Pan-STARRS 1	·	540 m	MPC · JPL
749637	2014 NL_{75}	—	July 7, 2014	Haleakala	Pan-STARRS 1	·	560 m	MPC · JPL
749638	2014 NC_{80}	—	July 5, 2014	Haleakala	Pan-STARRS 1	·	3.0 km	MPC · JPL
749639	2014 ND_{86}	—	July 5, 2014	Haleakala	Pan-STARRS 1	·	3.2 km	MPC · JPL
749640	2014 OT	—	June 2, 2014	Haleakala	Pan-STARRS 1	·	520 m	MPC · JPL
749641	2014 OP_{4}	—	July 25, 2014	Tenerife	ESA OGS	HOF	1.6 km	MPC · JPL
749642	2014 OF_{8}	—	December 27, 2011	Mount Lemmon	Mount Lemmon Survey	·	1.9 km	MPC · JPL
749643	2014 OH_{12}	—	February 26, 2008	Mount Lemmon	Mount Lemmon Survey	·	1.4 km	MPC · JPL
749644	2014 OA_{14}	—	July 25, 2014	Haleakala	Pan-STARRS 1	·	500 m	MPC · JPL
749645	2014 OC_{15}	—	July 25, 2014	Haleakala	Pan-STARRS 1	·	1.7 km	MPC · JPL
749646	2014 OC_{20}	—	January 22, 2006	Mount Lemmon	Mount Lemmon Survey	·	490 m	MPC · JPL
749647	2014 OT_{21}	—	January 15, 2004	Kitt Peak	Spacewatch	·	1.3 km	MPC · JPL
749648	2014 OZ_{21}	—	July 25, 2014	Haleakala	Pan-STARRS 1	EOS	1.4 km	MPC · JPL
749649	2014 OG_{27}	—	June 25, 2014	Mount Lemmon	Mount Lemmon Survey	·	1.3 km	MPC · JPL
749650	2014 OC_{32}	—	July 25, 2014	Haleakala	Pan-STARRS 1	·	1.1 km	MPC · JPL
749651	2014 OA_{33}	—	January 4, 2013	Calar Alto-CASADO	Mottola, S.	·	1.5 km	MPC · JPL
749652	2014 OM_{33}	—	July 25, 2014	Haleakala	Pan-STARRS 1	·	1.4 km	MPC · JPL
749653	2014 OY_{39}	—	September 19, 2010	Kitt Peak	Spacewatch	·	1.4 km	MPC · JPL
749654	2014 OV_{43}	—	February 24, 2009	Calar Alto	F. Hormuth	·	820 m	MPC · JPL
749655	2014 OY_{44}	—	February 1, 2012	Mount Lemmon	Mount Lemmon Survey	KOR	1.0 km	MPC · JPL
749656	2014 OJ_{46}	—	June 27, 2014	Haleakala	Pan-STARRS 1	·	1.6 km	MPC · JPL
749657	2014 OV_{47}	—	September 19, 1998	Apache Point	SDSS	LIX	2.8 km	MPC · JPL
749658	2014 OK_{50}	—	April 10, 2013	Haleakala	Pan-STARRS 1	AGN	1.1 km	MPC · JPL
749659	2014 OX_{50}	—	July 3, 2014	Haleakala	Pan-STARRS 1	NYS	990 m	MPC · JPL
749660	2014 OZ_{50}	—	August 28, 2009	Kitt Peak	Spacewatch	·	2.1 km	MPC · JPL
749661	2014 OR_{53}	—	July 25, 2014	Haleakala	Pan-STARRS 1	·	880 m	MPC · JPL
749662	2014 OK_{54}	—	July 25, 2014	Haleakala	Pan-STARRS 1	TIR	2.8 km	MPC · JPL
749663	2014 OU_{56}	—	November 13, 2010	Mount Lemmon	Mount Lemmon Survey	·	1.6 km	MPC · JPL
749664	2014 OJ_{71}	—	August 28, 2003	Palomar	NEAT	·	2.7 km	MPC · JPL
749665	2014 OB_{77}	—	December 28, 2011	Mount Lemmon	Mount Lemmon Survey	·	1.7 km	MPC · JPL
749666	2014 ON_{79}	—	February 26, 2009	Kitt Peak	Spacewatch	·	1.1 km	MPC · JPL
749667	2014 OU_{81}	—	August 27, 2009	Kitt Peak	Spacewatch	·	1.8 km	MPC · JPL
749668	2014 OA_{82}	—	November 22, 2006	Kitt Peak	Spacewatch	·	1.3 km	MPC · JPL
749669	2014 OT_{82}	—	September 15, 2010	Mount Lemmon	Mount Lemmon Survey	·	1.6 km	MPC · JPL
749670	2014 OB_{89}	—	March 8, 2005	Mount Lemmon	Mount Lemmon Survey	·	990 m	MPC · JPL
749671	2014 OO_{91}	—	September 2, 2010	Mount Lemmon	Mount Lemmon Survey	·	1.2 km	MPC · JPL
749672	2014 OB_{92}	—	July 26, 2014	Haleakala	Pan-STARRS 1	·	1.3 km	MPC · JPL
749673	2014 OA_{95}	—	July 26, 2014	Haleakala	Pan-STARRS 1	·	660 m	MPC · JPL
749674	2014 OT_{95}	—	June 30, 2014	Mount Lemmon	Mount Lemmon Survey	MAR	790 m	MPC · JPL
749675	2014 OB_{96}	—	February 7, 1999	Mauna Kea	C. Veillet, J. Anderson	·	2.5 km	MPC · JPL
749676	2014 OK_{97}	—	December 22, 2001	Socorro	LINEAR	·	1.3 km	MPC · JPL
749677	2014 OW_{99}	—	March 9, 2011	Mount Lemmon	Mount Lemmon Survey	·	2.7 km	MPC · JPL
749678	2014 OZ_{99}	—	June 23, 2014	Mount Lemmon	Mount Lemmon Survey	AGN	1.0 km	MPC · JPL
749679	2014 OM_{102}	—	January 2, 2012	Kitt Peak	Spacewatch	·	880 m	MPC · JPL
749680	2014 ON_{102}	—	July 26, 2014	Haleakala	Pan-STARRS 1	·	2.1 km	MPC · JPL
749681	2014 OW_{102}	—	July 7, 2014	Haleakala	Pan-STARRS 1	·	510 m	MPC · JPL
749682	2014 OC_{106}	—	September 17, 1995	Kitt Peak	Spacewatch	·	1.1 km	MPC · JPL
749683	2014 OU_{113}	—	January 1, 2012	Mount Lemmon	Mount Lemmon Survey	WIT	810 m	MPC · JPL
749684	2014 OH_{121}	—	October 4, 1999	Kitt Peak	Spacewatch	·	1.4 km	MPC · JPL
749685	2014 ON_{127}	—	June 27, 2014	Haleakala	Pan-STARRS 1	·	1.2 km	MPC · JPL
749686	2014 OV_{127}	—	February 2, 2006	Mount Lemmon	Mount Lemmon Survey	ARM	2.5 km	MPC · JPL
749687	2014 OE_{129}	—	July 6, 2014	Haleakala	Pan-STARRS 1	·	550 m	MPC · JPL
749688	2014 OE_{130}	—	July 26, 2014	Haleakala	Pan-STARRS 1	·	1.4 km	MPC · JPL
749689	2014 OC_{131}	—	June 24, 2010	Mount Lemmon	Mount Lemmon Survey	EUN	970 m	MPC · JPL
749690	2014 OX_{131}	—	September 9, 2007	Kitt Peak	Spacewatch	3:2	3.4 km	MPC · JPL
749691	2014 OP_{135}	—	June 25, 2014	Mount Lemmon	Mount Lemmon Survey	·	1.7 km	MPC · JPL
749692	2014 ON_{136}	—	September 16, 2010	Kitt Peak	Spacewatch	·	1.1 km	MPC · JPL
749693	2014 OR_{138}	—	April 6, 2013	Mount Lemmon	Mount Lemmon Survey	·	1.2 km	MPC · JPL
749694	2014 OQ_{141}	—	June 27, 2014	Haleakala	Pan-STARRS 1	BRA	1.1 km	MPC · JPL
749695	2014 OC_{142}	—	January 19, 2012	Mayhill-ISON	L. Elenin	·	3.6 km	MPC · JPL
749696	2014 OY_{143}	—	July 4, 2014	Haleakala	Pan-STARRS 1	·	1.5 km	MPC · JPL
749697	2014 OE_{147}	—	July 4, 2014	Haleakala	Pan-STARRS 1	·	1.1 km	MPC · JPL
749698	2014 OK_{150}	—	July 27, 2014	Haleakala	Pan-STARRS 1	GEF	1.1 km	MPC · JPL
749699	2014 OD_{154}	—	March 8, 2013	Haleakala	Pan-STARRS 1	·	1.3 km	MPC · JPL
749700	2014 OQ_{154}	—	June 20, 2014	Haleakala	Pan-STARRS 1	·	1.5 km	MPC · JPL

== 749701–749800 ==
back to top

Designation			Discovery			Properties		Ref
Permanent	Provisional	Named after	Date	Site	Discoverer(s)	Category	Diam.	Ref
749701	2014 OT_{154}	—	February 14, 2013	Haleakala	Pan-STARRS 1	·	1.1 km	MPC · JPL
749702	2014 OY_{154}	—	July 27, 2014	Haleakala	Pan-STARRS 1	·	1.5 km	MPC · JPL
749703	2014 OY_{156}	—	June 20, 2014	Haleakala	Pan-STARRS 1	·	1.1 km	MPC · JPL
749704	2014 OL_{158}	—	August 23, 2003	Palomar	NEAT	·	2.8 km	MPC · JPL
749705	2014 OB_{159}	—	July 27, 2014	Haleakala	Pan-STARRS 1	·	610 m	MPC · JPL
749706	2014 OH_{164}	—	September 17, 2010	Mount Lemmon	Mount Lemmon Survey	·	1.4 km	MPC · JPL
749707	2014 OH_{166}	—	June 27, 2014	Haleakala	Pan-STARRS 1	HNS	1.0 km	MPC · JPL
749708	2014 OP_{178}	—	July 27, 2014	Haleakala	Pan-STARRS 1	·	1.2 km	MPC · JPL
749709	2014 OF_{181}	—	July 8, 2014	Haleakala	Pan-STARRS 1	·	1.8 km	MPC · JPL
749710	2014 OC_{183}	—	April 9, 2013	Haleakala	Pan-STARRS 1	·	1.3 km	MPC · JPL
749711	2014 OP_{183}	—	July 6, 2014	Haleakala	Pan-STARRS 1	·	1.4 km	MPC · JPL
749712	2014 OP_{187}	—	January 18, 2012	Mount Lemmon	Mount Lemmon Survey	·	3.4 km	MPC · JPL
749713	2014 ON_{188}	—	September 29, 2005	Kitt Peak	Spacewatch	·	1.5 km	MPC · JPL
749714	2014 OU_{190}	—	July 27, 2014	Haleakala	Pan-STARRS 1	·	480 m	MPC · JPL
749715	2014 OV_{191}	—	July 27, 2014	Haleakala	Pan-STARRS 1	·	720 m	MPC · JPL
749716	2014 OW_{191}	—	July 27, 2014	Haleakala	Pan-STARRS 1	·	550 m	MPC · JPL
749717	2014 OV_{192}	—	November 22, 2011	Mount Lemmon	Mount Lemmon Survey	·	560 m	MPC · JPL
749718	2014 OW_{192}	—	July 27, 2014	Haleakala	Pan-STARRS 1	·	600 m	MPC · JPL
749719	2014 OW_{193}	—	January 30, 2011	Bergisch Gladbach	W. Bickel	·	2.2 km	MPC · JPL
749720	2014 ON_{196}	—	June 29, 2005	Kitt Peak	Spacewatch	·	1.3 km	MPC · JPL
749721	2014 OO_{196}	—	September 4, 2000	Kitt Peak	Spacewatch	MRX	860 m	MPC · JPL
749722	2014 OC_{202}	—	September 19, 2010	Kitt Peak	Spacewatch	·	1.3 km	MPC · JPL
749723	2014 OV_{202}	—	March 19, 2013	Haleakala	Pan-STARRS 1	·	1.3 km	MPC · JPL
749724	2014 OA_{204}	—	April 16, 2013	Cerro Tololo	DECam	AGN	810 m	MPC · JPL
749725	2014 OO_{205}	—	August 31, 2005	Palomar	NEAT	·	1.9 km	MPC · JPL
749726	2014 OF_{206}	—	June 27, 2014	Haleakala	Pan-STARRS 1	PHO	710 m	MPC · JPL
749727	2014 OC_{213}	—	September 15, 2010	Kitt Peak	Spacewatch	·	1.8 km	MPC · JPL
749728	2014 OQ_{213}	—	March 16, 2013	Kitt Peak	Spacewatch	·	1.1 km	MPC · JPL
749729	2014 OK_{218}	—	July 27, 2014	Haleakala	Pan-STARRS 1	(5)	1.0 km	MPC · JPL
749730	2014 OQ_{221}	—	December 7, 2010	Mount Lemmon	Mount Lemmon Survey	TIR	2.3 km	MPC · JPL
749731	2014 OW_{221}	—	June 29, 2014	Haleakala	Pan-STARRS 1	·	480 m	MPC · JPL
749732	2014 OX_{222}	—	October 31, 2010	Tenerife	ESA OGS	MRX	790 m	MPC · JPL
749733	2014 OF_{224}	—	November 3, 2010	Kitt Peak	Spacewatch	·	2.1 km	MPC · JPL
749734	2014 OX_{225}	—	January 20, 2012	Kitt Peak	Spacewatch	·	2.0 km	MPC · JPL
749735	2014 OU_{226}	—	May 19, 2005	Mount Lemmon	Mount Lemmon Survey	·	1.6 km	MPC · JPL
749736	2014 OT_{228}	—	January 14, 2011	Mount Lemmon	Mount Lemmon Survey	·	1.5 km	MPC · JPL
749737	2014 OZ_{229}	—	August 9, 2004	Campo Imperatore	CINEOS	·	530 m	MPC · JPL
749738	2014 OM_{231}	—	March 16, 2008	Kitt Peak	Spacewatch	·	2.2 km	MPC · JPL
749739	2014 OJ_{236}	—	May 7, 2014	Haleakala	Pan-STARRS 1	EUN	940 m	MPC · JPL
749740	2014 OR_{236}	—	September 4, 2011	Haleakala	Pan-STARRS 1	·	1.0 km	MPC · JPL
749741	2014 OY_{245}	—	July 29, 2014	Haleakala	Pan-STARRS 1	MAR	790 m	MPC · JPL
749742	2014 OH_{247}	—	April 16, 2004	Kitt Peak	Spacewatch	·	1.6 km	MPC · JPL
749743	2014 OA_{249}	—	June 26, 2014	Haleakala	Pan-STARRS 1	·	520 m	MPC · JPL
749744	2014 OS_{252}	—	July 3, 2014	Haleakala	Pan-STARRS 1	·	700 m	MPC · JPL
749745	2014 OO_{253}	—	June 27, 2014	Haleakala	Pan-STARRS 1	GEF	810 m	MPC · JPL
749746	2014 OB_{254}	—	December 15, 2006	Mount Lemmon	Mount Lemmon Survey	·	1.7 km	MPC · JPL
749747	2014 OW_{259}	—	September 28, 2006	Kitt Peak	Spacewatch	·	1.1 km	MPC · JPL
749748	2014 OZ_{259}	—	October 5, 2005	Catalina	CSS	·	1.8 km	MPC · JPL
749749	2014 OR_{262}	—	May 2, 2009	Kitt Peak	Spacewatch	EUN	1.1 km	MPC · JPL
749750	2014 OX_{267}	—	September 23, 2009	Mount Lemmon	Mount Lemmon Survey	·	3.0 km	MPC · JPL
749751	2014 OQ_{269}	—	March 27, 2012	Haleakala	Pan-STARRS 1	·	2.3 km	MPC · JPL
749752	2014 OK_{270}	—	June 29, 2014	Haleakala	Pan-STARRS 1	·	1.6 km	MPC · JPL
749753	2014 OS_{273}	—	November 12, 2010	Mount Lemmon	Mount Lemmon Survey	·	1.7 km	MPC · JPL
749754	2014 OC_{274}	—	August 28, 2005	Kitt Peak	Spacewatch	·	1.5 km	MPC · JPL
749755	2014 OX_{278}	—	October 23, 2011	Mount Lemmon	Mount Lemmon Survey	·	560 m	MPC · JPL
749756	2014 OQ_{280}	—	March 8, 2013	Haleakala	Pan-STARRS 1	·	1.6 km	MPC · JPL
749757	2014 OR_{282}	—	June 26, 2014	Haleakala	Pan-STARRS 1	·	530 m	MPC · JPL
749758	2014 OL_{284}	—	July 8, 2014	Haleakala	Pan-STARRS 1	·	1.5 km	MPC · JPL
749759	2014 OS_{287}	—	May 24, 2000	Kitt Peak	Spacewatch	·	1.6 km	MPC · JPL
749760	2014 OT_{287}	—	July 29, 2014	Haleakala	Pan-STARRS 1	·	1.9 km	MPC · JPL
749761	2014 OB_{293}	—	November 24, 2011	Haleakala	Pan-STARRS 1	·	490 m	MPC · JPL
749762	2014 OA_{295}	—	July 29, 2014	Haleakala	Pan-STARRS 1	·	570 m	MPC · JPL
749763	2014 OK_{296}	—	July 29, 2014	Haleakala	Pan-STARRS 1	·	530 m	MPC · JPL
749764	2014 OZ_{296}	—	July 29, 2014	Haleakala	Pan-STARRS 1	·	520 m	MPC · JPL
749765	2014 OJ_{298}	—	September 25, 2008	Mount Lemmon	Mount Lemmon Survey	·	2.7 km	MPC · JPL
749766	2014 OY_{301}	—	July 25, 2014	Haleakala	Pan-STARRS 1	·	1.3 km	MPC · JPL
749767	2014 OP_{308}	—	July 27, 2014	Haleakala	Pan-STARRS 1	·	1.2 km	MPC · JPL
749768	2014 OD_{312}	—	December 9, 2012	Mount Lemmon	Mount Lemmon Survey	·	1.6 km	MPC · JPL
749769	2014 OH_{312}	—	June 2, 2014	Haleakala	Pan-STARRS 1	·	1.7 km	MPC · JPL
749770	2014 OT_{314}	—	June 26, 2014	Haleakala	Pan-STARRS 1	MAR	900 m	MPC · JPL
749771	2014 OG_{318}	—	September 15, 2010	Kitt Peak	Spacewatch	AGN	890 m	MPC · JPL
749772	2014 OH_{322}	—	October 1, 2010	Kitt Peak	Spacewatch	·	1.3 km	MPC · JPL
749773	2014 OR_{323}	—	July 25, 2014	Haleakala	Pan-STARRS 1	·	1.6 km	MPC · JPL
749774	2014 OC_{325}	—	July 27, 2014	Haleakala	Pan-STARRS 1	·	1.6 km	MPC · JPL
749775	2014 OM_{326}	—	January 19, 2012	Haleakala	Pan-STARRS 1	EOS	1.7 km	MPC · JPL
749776	2014 OQ_{327}	—	October 14, 2010	Mount Lemmon	Mount Lemmon Survey	·	1.4 km	MPC · JPL
749777	2014 OG_{328}	—	October 30, 2005	Mount Lemmon	Mount Lemmon Survey	KOR	940 m	MPC · JPL
749778	2014 OT_{329}	—	August 31, 2005	Kitt Peak	Spacewatch	·	1.6 km	MPC · JPL
749779	2014 OX_{329}	—	July 3, 2014	Haleakala	Pan-STARRS 1	·	1.6 km	MPC · JPL
749780	2014 OD_{342}	—	June 28, 2014	Kitt Peak	Spacewatch	·	500 m	MPC · JPL
749781	2014 OS_{342}	—	July 28, 2014	Haleakala	Pan-STARRS 1	·	1.7 km	MPC · JPL
749782	2014 OZ_{342}	—	July 3, 2014	Haleakala	Pan-STARRS 1	·	530 m	MPC · JPL
749783	2014 OH_{350}	—	December 15, 2010	Mount Lemmon	Mount Lemmon Survey	·	2.6 km	MPC · JPL
749784	2014 ON_{350}	—	August 20, 2009	Bergisch Gladbach	W. Bickel	EOS	2.0 km	MPC · JPL
749785	2014 OB_{352}	—	July 7, 2014	Haleakala	Pan-STARRS 1	·	1.4 km	MPC · JPL
749786	2014 OY_{356}	—	July 28, 2014	Haleakala	Pan-STARRS 1	KOR	1.2 km	MPC · JPL
749787	2014 OV_{357}	—	November 1, 2005	Kitt Peak	Spacewatch	·	1.5 km	MPC · JPL
749788	2014 OM_{358}	—	September 18, 2010	Mount Lemmon	Mount Lemmon Survey	·	980 m	MPC · JPL
749789	2014 OH_{360}	—	June 30, 2014	Catalina	CSS	JUN	1.0 km	MPC · JPL
749790	2014 OL_{364}	—	September 30, 2005	Mauna Kea	A. Boattini	THM	1.6 km	MPC · JPL
749791	2014 OU_{370}	—	July 4, 2014	Haleakala	Pan-STARRS 1	HOF	1.6 km	MPC · JPL
749792	2014 OT_{372}	—	June 5, 2014	Haleakala	Pan-STARRS 1	·	510 m	MPC · JPL
749793	2014 OE_{374}	—	June 2, 2014	Haleakala	Pan-STARRS 1	·	1.4 km	MPC · JPL
749794	2014 OR_{378}	—	October 26, 2011	Haleakala	Pan-STARRS 1	·	520 m	MPC · JPL
749795	2014 OQ_{380}	—	June 22, 2014	Haleakala	Pan-STARRS 1	·	1.6 km	MPC · JPL
749796	2014 OT_{380}	—	August 25, 2005	Palomar	NEAT	·	1.6 km	MPC · JPL
749797	2014 OF_{382}	—	June 27, 2014	Haleakala	Pan-STARRS 1	·	1.7 km	MPC · JPL
749798	2014 OW_{382}	—	May 25, 2014	Haleakala	Pan-STARRS 1	·	2.0 km	MPC · JPL
749799	2014 OU_{387}	—	September 22, 2009	Kitt Peak	Spacewatch	THM	1.9 km	MPC · JPL
749800	2014 OR_{388}	—	June 22, 2009	Mount Lemmon	Mount Lemmon Survey	·	1.6 km	MPC · JPL

== 749801–749900 ==
back to top

Designation			Discovery			Properties		Ref
Permanent	Provisional	Named after	Date	Site	Discoverer(s)	Category	Diam.	Ref
749801	2014 OY_{393}	—	July 25, 2014	Haleakala	Pan-STARRS 1	centaur	70 km	MPC · JPL
749802	2014 OQ_{397}	—	July 28, 2014	Haleakala	Pan-STARRS 1	·	1.5 km	MPC · JPL
749803	2014 OG_{399}	—	October 12, 2005	Kitt Peak	Spacewatch	AGN	810 m	MPC · JPL
749804	2014 OC_{400}	—	July 25, 2014	Haleakala	Pan-STARRS 1	·	1.8 km	MPC · JPL
749805	2014 OX_{401}	—	July 28, 2014	Haleakala	Pan-STARRS 1	·	1.4 km	MPC · JPL
749806	2014 OS_{402}	—	April 13, 2013	Haleakala	Pan-STARRS 1	·	1.9 km	MPC · JPL
749807	2014 OM_{404}	—	September 19, 2003	Kitt Peak	Spacewatch	·	2.4 km	MPC · JPL
749808	2014 ON_{404}	—	February 3, 2012	Haleakala	Pan-STARRS 1	·	1.4 km	MPC · JPL
749809	2014 OG_{408}	—	January 21, 2012	Kitt Peak	Spacewatch	·	1.6 km	MPC · JPL
749810	2014 OS_{409}	—	July 25, 2014	Haleakala	Pan-STARRS 1	KOR	1.0 km	MPC · JPL
749811	2014 OF_{410}	—	July 26, 2014	Haleakala	Pan-STARRS 1	·	1.4 km	MPC · JPL
749812	2014 OF_{411}	—	October 12, 2010	Mount Lemmon	Mount Lemmon Survey	·	1.3 km	MPC · JPL
749813	2014 OS_{411}	—	July 28, 2014	Haleakala	Pan-STARRS 1	KOR	1.1 km	MPC · JPL
749814	2014 OB_{414}	—	July 30, 2014	Haleakala	Pan-STARRS 1	NAE	1.8 km	MPC · JPL
749815	2014 OE_{416}	—	July 31, 2014	Haleakala	Pan-STARRS 1	·	2.5 km	MPC · JPL
749816	2014 OW_{419}	—	January 19, 2012	Mount Lemmon	Mount Lemmon Survey	HOF	2.1 km	MPC · JPL
749817	2014 OP_{425}	—	July 25, 2014	Haleakala	Pan-STARRS 1	·	1.4 km	MPC · JPL
749818	2014 OJ_{428}	—	October 12, 2010	Bergisch Gladbach	W. Bickel	·	1.6 km	MPC · JPL
749819	2014 OT_{432}	—	July 30, 2014	Haleakala	Pan-STARRS 1	·	490 m	MPC · JPL
749820	2014 OY_{454}	—	July 26, 2014	Haleakala	Pan-STARRS 1	·	1.5 km	MPC · JPL
749821	2014 PH	—	January 29, 2012	Mount Lemmon	Mount Lemmon Survey	·	3.6 km	MPC · JPL
749822	2014 PC_{1}	—	July 25, 2014	Haleakala	Pan-STARRS 1	·	1.6 km	MPC · JPL
749823	2014 PQ_{1}	—	January 17, 2012	Bergisch Gladbach	W. Bickel	·	1.5 km	MPC · JPL
749824	2014 PH_{2}	—	January 3, 2011	Mount Lemmon	Mount Lemmon Survey	THM	1.8 km	MPC · JPL
749825	2014 PR_{9}	—	December 28, 2011	Mount Lemmon	Mount Lemmon Survey	GEF	1.0 km	MPC · JPL
749826	2014 PY_{13}	—	July 25, 2014	Haleakala	Pan-STARRS 1	·	470 m	MPC · JPL
749827	2014 PL_{14}	—	July 25, 2014	Haleakala	Pan-STARRS 1	MAS	590 m	MPC · JPL
749828	2014 PG_{15}	—	July 25, 2014	Haleakala	Pan-STARRS 1	·	2.4 km	MPC · JPL
749829	2014 PO_{15}	—	July 25, 2014	Haleakala	Pan-STARRS 1	BRA	1.4 km	MPC · JPL
749830	2014 PB_{19}	—	July 25, 2014	Haleakala	Pan-STARRS 1	·	1.6 km	MPC · JPL
749831	2014 PS_{19}	—	September 26, 2005	Kitt Peak	Spacewatch	·	1.4 km	MPC · JPL
749832	2014 PG_{23}	—	July 25, 2014	Haleakala	Pan-STARRS 1	KOR	1.1 km	MPC · JPL
749833	2014 PH_{25}	—	September 23, 2009	Mount Lemmon	Mount Lemmon Survey	·	1.7 km	MPC · JPL
749834	2014 PL_{25}	—	June 5, 2014	Haleakala	Pan-STARRS 1	·	530 m	MPC · JPL
749835	2014 PZ_{25}	—	July 25, 2014	Haleakala	Pan-STARRS 1	·	1.1 km	MPC · JPL
749836	2014 PJ_{26}	—	April 10, 2013	Haleakala	Pan-STARRS 1	·	1.4 km	MPC · JPL
749837	2014 PK_{31}	—	November 13, 2010	Mount Lemmon	Mount Lemmon Survey	·	1.6 km	MPC · JPL
749838	2014 PF_{33}	—	May 16, 2009	Kitt Peak	Spacewatch	MAR	730 m	MPC · JPL
749839	2014 PK_{33}	—	November 27, 2011	Kitt Peak	Spacewatch	·	620 m	MPC · JPL
749840	2014 PX_{35}	—	July 25, 2014	Haleakala	Pan-STARRS 1	·	1.2 km	MPC · JPL
749841	2014 PB_{37}	—	October 23, 2011	Haleakala	Pan-STARRS 1	·	510 m	MPC · JPL
749842	2014 PC_{37}	—	November 3, 2011	Mount Lemmon	Mount Lemmon Survey	·	540 m	MPC · JPL
749843	2014 PV_{38}	—	April 22, 2009	Mount Lemmon	Mount Lemmon Survey	·	1.0 km	MPC · JPL
749844	2014 PE_{47}	—	August 4, 2014	Haleakala	Pan-STARRS 1	·	1.9 km	MPC · JPL
749845	2014 PU_{47}	—	November 24, 2008	Kitt Peak	Spacewatch	·	490 m	MPC · JPL
749846	2014 PA_{48}	—	November 3, 2011	Mount Lemmon	Mount Lemmon Survey	·	540 m	MPC · JPL
749847	2014 PC_{53}	—	January 29, 2012	Mount Lemmon	Mount Lemmon Survey	·	2.0 km	MPC · JPL
749848	2014 PB_{56}	—	June 28, 2014	Mount Lemmon	Mount Lemmon Survey	·	1.8 km	MPC · JPL
749849	2014 PA_{66}	—	September 10, 2010	Kitt Peak	Spacewatch	·	1.1 km	MPC · JPL
749850	2014 PR_{67}	—	November 20, 2008	Mount Lemmon	Mount Lemmon Survey	·	460 m	MPC · JPL
749851	2014 PC_{69}	—	July 7, 2014	Haleakala	Pan-STARRS 1	·	1.7 km	MPC · JPL
749852	2014 PY_{71}	—	February 5, 2011	Mount Lemmon	Mount Lemmon Survey	·	1.2 km	MPC · JPL
749853	2014 PP_{72}	—	January 28, 2007	Mount Lemmon	Mount Lemmon Survey	·	1.7 km	MPC · JPL
749854	2014 PE_{74}	—	April 10, 2013	Haleakala	Pan-STARRS 1	·	2.0 km	MPC · JPL
749855	2014 PP_{75}	—	August 3, 2014	Haleakala	Pan-STARRS 1	·	1.5 km	MPC · JPL
749856	2014 PV_{75}	—	August 3, 2014	Haleakala	Pan-STARRS 1	·	1.2 km	MPC · JPL
749857	2014 PX_{75}	—	August 3, 2014	Haleakala	Pan-STARRS 1	·	1.6 km	MPC · JPL
749858	2014 PB_{77}	—	August 4, 2014	Haleakala	Pan-STARRS 1	·	1.5 km	MPC · JPL
749859	2014 PJ_{77}	—	July 31, 2014	Haleakala	Pan-STARRS 1	·	1.7 km	MPC · JPL
749860	2014 PP_{77}	—	August 6, 2014	Kitt Peak	Spacewatch	·	1.5 km	MPC · JPL
749861	2014 PU_{77}	—	August 6, 2014	Haleakala	Pan-STARRS 1	ARM	3.0 km	MPC · JPL
749862	2014 PR_{78}	—	November 2, 2011	Mount Lemmon	Mount Lemmon Survey	·	690 m	MPC · JPL
749863	2014 PT_{80}	—	February 17, 2010	Kitt Peak	Spacewatch	·	510 m	MPC · JPL
749864	2014 PS_{82}	—	August 6, 2014	Haleakala	Pan-STARRS 1	·	550 m	MPC · JPL
749865	2014 PT_{82}	—	August 3, 2014	Haleakala	Pan-STARRS 1	·	2.5 km	MPC · JPL
749866	2014 PK_{89}	—	August 3, 2014	Haleakala	Pan-STARRS 1	·	1.1 km	MPC · JPL
749867	2014 PG_{92}	—	August 3, 2014	Haleakala	Pan-STARRS 1	·	2.4 km	MPC · JPL
749868	2014 QX	—	June 23, 2014	Kitt Peak	Spacewatch	·	1.1 km	MPC · JPL
749869	2014 QZ_{2}	—	June 8, 2014	Mount Lemmon	Mount Lemmon Survey	·	1.5 km	MPC · JPL
749870	2014 QU_{8}	—	August 18, 2014	Haleakala	Pan-STARRS 1	HNS	810 m	MPC · JPL
749871	2014 QV_{11}	—	November 30, 2010	Mount Lemmon	Mount Lemmon Survey	·	1.9 km	MPC · JPL
749872	2014 QQ_{13}	—	June 3, 2014	Haleakala	Pan-STARRS 1	·	2.0 km	MPC · JPL
749873	2014 QG_{14}	—	August 18, 2014	Haleakala	Pan-STARRS 1	·	1.9 km	MPC · JPL
749874	2014 QD_{15}	—	June 30, 2014	Haleakala	Pan-STARRS 1	·	1.2 km	MPC · JPL
749875	2014 QL_{15}	—	August 18, 2014	Haleakala	Pan-STARRS 1	·	2.6 km	MPC · JPL
749876	2014 QR_{19}	—	August 10, 2008	La Sagra	OAM	·	2.6 km	MPC · JPL
749877	2014 QC_{21}	—	August 18, 2014	Haleakala	Pan-STARRS 1	H	440 m	MPC · JPL
749878	2014 QJ_{21}	—	August 6, 2014	Haleakala	Pan-STARRS 1	·	490 m	MPC · JPL
749879	2014 QK_{21}	—	February 12, 2012	Westfield	R. Holmes	·	2.3 km	MPC · JPL
749880	2014 QS_{22}	—	August 18, 2014	Haleakala	Pan-STARRS 1	·	540 m	MPC · JPL
749881	2014 QR_{24}	—	August 6, 2014	Haleakala	Pan-STARRS 1	·	1.4 km	MPC · JPL
749882	2014 QU_{24}	—	February 14, 2013	Haleakala	Pan-STARRS 1	·	1.2 km	MPC · JPL
749883	2014 QU_{25}	—	February 6, 2013	Kitt Peak	Spacewatch	·	2.0 km	MPC · JPL
749884	2014 QN_{26}	—	January 29, 2011	Mount Lemmon	Mount Lemmon Survey	·	2.4 km	MPC · JPL
749885	2014 QU_{26}	—	April 10, 2013	Haleakala	Pan-STARRS 1	·	750 m	MPC · JPL
749886	2014 QD_{28}	—	August 8, 2007	Socorro	LINEAR	·	690 m	MPC · JPL
749887	2014 QL_{33}	—	July 30, 2014	Haleakala	Pan-STARRS 1	H	470 m	MPC · JPL
749888	2014 QC_{36}	—	June 3, 2014	Haleakala	Pan-STARRS 1	·	2.6 km	MPC · JPL
749889	2014 QG_{36}	—	December 28, 2011	Mount Lemmon	Mount Lemmon Survey	·	3.0 km	MPC · JPL
749890	2014 QA_{37}	—	May 31, 2014	Haleakala	Pan-STARRS 1	EOS	1.4 km	MPC · JPL
749891	2014 QC_{40}	—	March 13, 2008	Mount Lemmon	Mount Lemmon Survey	GAL	1.1 km	MPC · JPL
749892	2014 QD_{43}	—	July 28, 2009	Kitt Peak	Spacewatch	H	470 m	MPC · JPL
749893	2014 QF_{45}	—	June 3, 2014	Haleakala	Pan-STARRS 1	·	1.6 km	MPC · JPL
749894	2014 QL_{46}	—	August 16, 2014	Haleakala	Pan-STARRS 1	·	1.8 km	MPC · JPL
749895	2014 QG_{47}	—	March 31, 2005	Vail	Observatory, Jarnac	RAF	950 m	MPC · JPL
749896	2014 QF_{48}	—	July 1, 2014	Haleakala	Pan-STARRS 1	·	1.4 km	MPC · JPL
749897	2014 QA_{51}	—	October 14, 2006	Eskridge	G. Hug	·	1.1 km	MPC · JPL
749898	2014 QY_{52}	—	March 19, 2013	Haleakala	Pan-STARRS 1	·	1.3 km	MPC · JPL
749899	2014 QL_{57}	—	October 24, 2011	Haleakala	Pan-STARRS 1	·	1.5 km	MPC · JPL
749900	2014 QN_{60}	—	July 7, 2014	Haleakala	Pan-STARRS 1	·	1.4 km	MPC · JPL

== 749901–750000 ==
back to top

Designation			Discovery			Properties		Ref
Permanent	Provisional	Named after	Date	Site	Discoverer(s)	Category	Diam.	Ref
749901	2014 QM_{61}	—	July 7, 2014	Haleakala	Pan-STARRS 1	·	500 m	MPC · JPL
749902	2014 QE_{62}	—	July 28, 2014	Haleakala	Pan-STARRS 1	·	1.1 km	MPC · JPL
749903	2014 QT_{70}	—	August 20, 2014	Haleakala	Pan-STARRS 1	EUN	910 m	MPC · JPL
749904	2014 QV_{71}	—	July 1, 2014	Haleakala	Pan-STARRS 1	·	1.4 km	MPC · JPL
749905	2014 QO_{79}	—	March 1, 2008	Kitt Peak	Spacewatch	GEF	920 m	MPC · JPL
749906	2014 QP_{82}	—	November 1, 2010	Mount Lemmon	Mount Lemmon Survey	·	1.4 km	MPC · JPL
749907	2014 QS_{85}	—	June 3, 2014	Haleakala	Pan-STARRS 1	·	1.9 km	MPC · JPL
749908	2014 QC_{90}	—	December 15, 2010	Mount Lemmon	Mount Lemmon Survey	·	2.5 km	MPC · JPL
749909	2014 QT_{97}	—	August 20, 2014	Haleakala	Pan-STARRS 1	·	1.7 km	MPC · JPL
749910	2014 QB_{101}	—	April 10, 2013	Haleakala	Pan-STARRS 1	·	1.5 km	MPC · JPL
749911	2014 QO_{102}	—	October 8, 2010	Kitt Peak	Spacewatch	·	1.2 km	MPC · JPL
749912	2014 QZ_{103}	—	January 26, 2012	Haleakala	Pan-STARRS 1	·	1.6 km	MPC · JPL
749913	2014 QW_{104}	—	August 20, 2014	Haleakala	Pan-STARRS 1	·	1.3 km	MPC · JPL
749914	2014 QJ_{107}	—	September 29, 2010	Mount Lemmon	Mount Lemmon Survey	·	1.4 km	MPC · JPL
749915	2014 QT_{109}	—	August 26, 1998	Kitt Peak	Spacewatch	·	2.2 km	MPC · JPL
749916	2014 QK_{117}	—	November 1, 2010	Mount Lemmon	Mount Lemmon Survey	AEO	830 m	MPC · JPL
749917	2014 QJ_{122}	—	March 8, 2013	Haleakala	Pan-STARRS 1	·	590 m	MPC · JPL
749918	2014 QU_{124}	—	August 3, 2014	Haleakala	Pan-STARRS 1	·	730 m	MPC · JPL
749919	2014 QL_{125}	—	August 18, 2009	Kitt Peak	Spacewatch	·	1.4 km	MPC · JPL
749920	2014 QE_{132}	—	September 29, 2011	Mount Lemmon	Mount Lemmon Survey	·	500 m	MPC · JPL
749921	2014 QS_{133}	—	August 23, 2004	Kitt Peak	Spacewatch	·	530 m	MPC · JPL
749922	2014 QB_{136}	—	November 6, 2010	Mount Lemmon	Mount Lemmon Survey	·	1.2 km	MPC · JPL
749923	2014 QZ_{141}	—	February 21, 2012	Mount Lemmon	Mount Lemmon Survey	·	2.3 km	MPC · JPL
749924	2014 QC_{145}	—	August 3, 2014	Haleakala	Pan-STARRS 1	EOS	1.5 km	MPC · JPL
749925	2014 QD_{145}	—	October 8, 2007	Mount Lemmon	Mount Lemmon Survey	·	710 m	MPC · JPL
749926	2014 QB_{148}	—	August 20, 2014	Haleakala	Pan-STARRS 1	·	1.5 km	MPC · JPL
749927	2014 QC_{148}	—	September 27, 2005	Kitt Peak	Spacewatch	·	1.4 km	MPC · JPL
749928	2014 QD_{148}	—	December 6, 2005	Mount Lemmon	Mount Lemmon Survey	KOR	1.2 km	MPC · JPL
749929	2014 QT_{150}	—	July 31, 2014	Haleakala	Pan-STARRS 1	·	1.9 km	MPC · JPL
749930	2014 QY_{152}	—	August 6, 2014	Haleakala	Pan-STARRS 1	·	2.7 km	MPC · JPL
749931	2014 QE_{160}	—	October 29, 2010	Mount Lemmon	Mount Lemmon Survey	EOS	1.7 km	MPC · JPL
749932	2014 QL_{161}	—	August 16, 2009	Kitt Peak	Spacewatch	ARM	2.6 km	MPC · JPL
749933	2014 QG_{162}	—	August 19, 2009	La Sagra	OAM	EOS	1.7 km	MPC · JPL
749934	2014 QM_{163}	—	July 29, 2014	Haleakala	Pan-STARRS 1	·	960 m	MPC · JPL
749935	2014 QY_{166}	—	August 22, 2014	Haleakala	Pan-STARRS 1	·	1.7 km	MPC · JPL
749936	2014 QM_{169}	—	August 17, 2014	Haleakala	Pan-STARRS 1	·	1.4 km	MPC · JPL
749937	2014 QG_{170}	—	April 7, 2007	Mount Lemmon	Mount Lemmon Survey	·	480 m	MPC · JPL
749938	2014 QD_{172}	—	July 7, 2014	Haleakala	Pan-STARRS 1	·	510 m	MPC · JPL
749939	2014 QS_{173}	—	August 5, 2014	Haleakala	Pan-STARRS 1	·	2.0 km	MPC · JPL
749940	2014 QH_{175}	—	November 8, 2010	Mount Lemmon	Mount Lemmon Survey	HOF	1.9 km	MPC · JPL
749941	2014 QJ_{175}	—	December 17, 2011	Črni Vrh	Skvarč, J.	·	670 m	MPC · JPL
749942	2014 QW_{176}	—	April 8, 2010	Mount Lemmon	Mount Lemmon Survey	·	510 m	MPC · JPL
749943	2014 QJ_{177}	—	October 14, 2001	Apache Point	SDSS	·	450 m	MPC · JPL
749944	2014 QH_{184}	—	August 22, 2014	Haleakala	Pan-STARRS 1	·	1.0 km	MPC · JPL
749945	2014 QX_{184}	—	October 9, 2010	Mount Lemmon	Mount Lemmon Survey	·	1.4 km	MPC · JPL
749946	2014 QT_{185}	—	February 10, 2008	Kitt Peak	Spacewatch	·	1.4 km	MPC · JPL
749947	2014 QD_{191}	—	April 10, 2013	Haleakala	Pan-STARRS 1	·	1.1 km	MPC · JPL
749948	2014 QR_{192}	—	August 22, 2014	Haleakala	Pan-STARRS 1	·	550 m	MPC · JPL
749949	2014 QJ_{194}	—	August 22, 2014	Haleakala	Pan-STARRS 1	·	1.6 km	MPC · JPL
749950	2014 QR_{202}	—	August 22, 2014	Haleakala	Pan-STARRS 1	·	920 m	MPC · JPL
749951	2014 QH_{203}	—	August 22, 2014	Haleakala	Pan-STARRS 1	·	1.6 km	MPC · JPL
749952	2014 QE_{208}	—	August 3, 2014	Haleakala	Pan-STARRS 1	·	550 m	MPC · JPL
749953	2014 QF_{208}	—	August 10, 2007	Kitt Peak	Spacewatch	·	620 m	MPC · JPL
749954	2014 QW_{209}	—	February 15, 2012	Haleakala	Pan-STARRS 1	AGN	840 m	MPC · JPL
749955	2014 QD_{210}	—	March 8, 2005	Mount Lemmon	Mount Lemmon Survey	·	2.2 km	MPC · JPL
749956	2014 QC_{213}	—	August 3, 2014	Haleakala	Pan-STARRS 1	JUN	700 m	MPC · JPL
749957	2014 QU_{214}	—	July 28, 2014	Haleakala	Pan-STARRS 1	·	720 m	MPC · JPL
749958	2014 QJ_{216}	—	February 1, 2012	Kitt Peak	Spacewatch	·	1.7 km	MPC · JPL
749959	2014 QG_{217}	—	August 3, 2014	Haleakala	Pan-STARRS 1	·	1.8 km	MPC · JPL
749960	2014 QS_{217}	—	February 10, 2008	Mount Lemmon	Mount Lemmon Survey	GEF	1.0 km	MPC · JPL
749961	2014 QD_{228}	—	August 3, 2014	Haleakala	Pan-STARRS 1	EOS	1.1 km	MPC · JPL
749962	2014 QM_{230}	—	August 22, 2014	Haleakala	Pan-STARRS 1	·	1.4 km	MPC · JPL
749963	2014 QJ_{235}	—	October 7, 2004	Kitt Peak	Spacewatch	·	510 m	MPC · JPL
749964	2014 QN_{235}	—	September 11, 2004	Kitt Peak	Spacewatch	KOR	920 m	MPC · JPL
749965	2014 QG_{236}	—	November 1, 2010	Mount Lemmon	Mount Lemmon Survey	WIT	770 m	MPC · JPL
749966	2014 QA_{237}	—	May 15, 2009	Kitt Peak	Spacewatch	·	910 m	MPC · JPL
749967	2014 QA_{239}	—	July 7, 2014	Haleakala	Pan-STARRS 1	·	1.6 km	MPC · JPL
749968	2014 QF_{239}	—	August 22, 2014	Haleakala	Pan-STARRS 1	·	1.7 km	MPC · JPL
749969	2014 QB_{242}	—	August 22, 2014	Haleakala	Pan-STARRS 1	·	1.9 km	MPC · JPL
749970	2014 QF_{242}	—	August 22, 2014	Haleakala	Pan-STARRS 1	WIT	690 m	MPC · JPL
749971	2014 QB_{243}	—	October 17, 2010	Mount Lemmon	Mount Lemmon Survey	·	1.5 km	MPC · JPL
749972	2014 QS_{243}	—	August 22, 2014	Haleakala	Pan-STARRS 1	·	1.4 km	MPC · JPL
749973	2014 QU_{245}	—	May 15, 2013	Haleakala	Pan-STARRS 1	·	1.3 km	MPC · JPL
749974	2014 QH_{248}	—	August 22, 2014	Haleakala	Pan-STARRS 1	·	1.8 km	MPC · JPL
749975	2014 QY_{249}	—	August 22, 2014	Haleakala	Pan-STARRS 1	·	1.8 km	MPC · JPL
749976	2014 QV_{250}	—	August 22, 2014	Haleakala	Pan-STARRS 1	EOS	1.6 km	MPC · JPL
749977	2014 QT_{252}	—	November 3, 2005	Kitt Peak	Spacewatch	·	1.6 km	MPC · JPL
749978	2014 QS_{253}	—	August 22, 2014	Haleakala	Pan-STARRS 1	·	1.9 km	MPC · JPL
749979	2014 QL_{254}	—	November 2, 2010	Mount Lemmon	Mount Lemmon Survey	·	1.4 km	MPC · JPL
749980	2014 QO_{255}	—	August 22, 2014	Haleakala	Pan-STARRS 1	TRE	2.1 km	MPC · JPL
749981	2014 QW_{258}	—	January 29, 2011	Mount Lemmon	Mount Lemmon Survey	·	1.4 km	MPC · JPL
749982	2014 QP_{261}	—	August 22, 2014	Haleakala	Pan-STARRS 1	·	3.0 km	MPC · JPL
749983	2014 QV_{261}	—	August 22, 2014	Haleakala	Pan-STARRS 1	TRE	2.6 km	MPC · JPL
749984	2014 QA_{265}	—	August 22, 2014	Haleakala	Pan-STARRS 1	EOS	1.5 km	MPC · JPL
749985	2014 QL_{265}	—	August 22, 2014	Haleakala	Pan-STARRS 1	·	2.9 km	MPC · JPL
749986	2014 QZ_{272}	—	August 22, 2014	Haleakala	Pan-STARRS 1	EOS	1.6 km	MPC · JPL
749987	2014 QF_{275}	—	July 29, 2014	Haleakala	Pan-STARRS 1	·	1.6 km	MPC · JPL
749988	2014 QV_{281}	—	October 27, 2005	Mount Lemmon	Mount Lemmon Survey	·	1.3 km	MPC · JPL
749989	2014 QV_{282}	—	August 25, 2014	Haleakala	Pan-STARRS 1	·	1.7 km	MPC · JPL
749990	2014 QG_{284}	—	September 27, 2009	Mount Lemmon	Mount Lemmon Survey	·	2.6 km	MPC · JPL
749991	2014 QZ_{284}	—	August 25, 2014	Haleakala	Pan-STARRS 1	·	1.9 km	MPC · JPL
749992	2014 QQ_{287}	—	May 14, 2009	Mount Lemmon	Mount Lemmon Survey	·	1.3 km	MPC · JPL
749993	2014 QA_{291}	—	January 11, 2011	Catalina	CSS	·	1.9 km	MPC · JPL
749994	2014 QB_{295}	—	August 3, 2014	Haleakala	Pan-STARRS 1	TIR	2.5 km	MPC · JPL
749995	2014 QR_{295}	—	August 22, 2014	Haleakala	Pan-STARRS 1	APO	750 m	MPC · JPL
749996	2014 QK_{296}	—	August 22, 2014	Haleakala	Pan-STARRS 1	AMO	690 m	MPC · JPL
749997	2014 QM_{301}	—	July 31, 2014	Haleakala	Pan-STARRS 1	·	570 m	MPC · JPL
749998	2014 QF_{308}	—	September 16, 2003	Kitt Peak	Spacewatch	THM	1.9 km	MPC · JPL
749999	2014 QZ_{314}	—	February 15, 2013	Haleakala	Pan-STARRS 1	·	1.7 km	MPC · JPL
750000	2014 QN_{317}	—	August 15, 2014	Haleakala	Pan-STARRS 1	EOS	1.4 km	MPC · JPL

back to top
