= Meanings of minor-planet names: 196001–197000 =

As minor planet discoveries are confirmed, they are given a permanent number by the IAU's Minor Planet Center (MPC), and the discoverers can then submit names for them, following the IAU's naming conventions. The list below concerns those minor planets in the specified number-range that have received names, and explains the meanings of those names.

Official naming citations of newly named small Solar System bodies are approved and published in a bulletin by IAU's Working Group for Small Bodies Nomenclature (WGSBN). Before May 2021, citations were published in MPC's Minor Planet Circulars for many decades. Recent citations can also be found on the JPL Small-Body Database (SBDB). Until his death in 2016, German astronomer Lutz D. Schmadel compiled these citations into the Dictionary of Minor Planet Names (DMP) and regularly updated the collection.

Based on Paul Herget's The Names of the Minor Planets, Schmadel also researched the unclear origin of numerous asteroids, most of which had been named prior to World War II. This article incorporates text from this source, which is in the public domain: SBDB New namings may only be added to this list below after official publication as the preannouncement of names is condemned. The WGSBN publishes a comprehensive guideline for the naming rules of non-cometary small Solar System bodies.

== 196001–196100 ==
| Named minor planet | Provisional | This minor planet was named for... | Ref · Catalog |
|---|---|---|---|
| 196005 Róbertschiller | 2002 RS_{241} | Róbert Schiller (born 1935), Hungarian physical chemist | JPL · 196005 |
| 196035 Haraldbill | 2002 SZ_{27} | Harald Bill (born 1964), a long-term friend of the discoverer, is a German amateur astronomer | JPL · 196035 |

== 196101–196200 ==
back to top

| Named minor planet | Provisional | This minor planet was named for... | Ref · Catalog |
|---|---|---|---|
There are no named minor planets in this number range

== 196201–196300 ==
back to top

| Named minor planet | Provisional | This minor planet was named for... | Ref · Catalog |
|---|---|---|---|
There are no named minor planets in this number range

== 196301–196400 ==
back to top

| Named minor planet | Provisional | This minor planet was named for... | Ref · Catalog |
|---|---|---|---|
There are no named minor planets in this number range

== 196401–196500 ==
back to top

| Named minor planet | Provisional | This minor planet was named for... | Ref · Catalog |
|---|---|---|---|
| 196411 Umurhan | 2003 GW_{51} | Orkan Umurhan (born 1969), a scientist at the SETI Institute, who worked for the New Horizons mission to Pluto as a science team post-doctoral researcher for geophysics investigations | JPL · 196411 |
| 196476 Humfernández | 2003 JU_{17} | Humberto Fernández-Morán (1924–1999), Venezuelan research scientist who developed the diamond knife. He created the Venezuelan Institute for Neurological and Brain Studies which is now known as the Venezuelan Institute of Scientific Research. | JPL · 196476 |
| 196481 VATT | 2003 KS_{2} | The Vatican Advanced Technology Telescope (VATT) | JPL · 196481 |

== 196501–196600 ==
back to top

| Named minor planet | Provisional | This minor planet was named for... | Ref · Catalog |
|---|---|---|---|
| 196540 Weinbaum | 2003 OW_{30} | Stanley G. Weinbaum (1902–1935), American science-fiction author | JPL · 196540 |

== 196601–196700 ==
back to top

| Named minor planet | Provisional | This minor planet was named for... | Ref · Catalog |
|---|---|---|---|
| 196640 Mulhacén | 2003 SO_{15} | Mulhacén, the highest mountain of the Iberian Peninsula | JPL · 196640 |

== 196701–196800 ==
back to top

| Named minor planet | Provisional | This minor planet was named for... | Ref · Catalog |
|---|---|---|---|
| 196736 Munkácsy | 2003 SH_{127} | Mihály Munkácsy (1844–1900), a Hungarian painter who lived in Paris and gained an international reputation with his genre pictures and large-scale biblical paintings. | JPL · 196736 |
| 196772 Fritzleiber | 2003 SQ_{170} | Fritz Leiber (1910–1992), American science-fiction writer | JPL · 196772 |

== 196801–196900 ==
back to top

| Named minor planet | Provisional | This minor planet was named for... | Ref · Catalog |
|---|---|---|---|
| 196807 Beshore | 2003 SB_{221} | Ed Beshore (born 1954), American operations manager and lead software engineer for the near-Earth object search programs at the Catalina, Siding Spring and Mount Lemmon surveys. He has discovered several comets including 297P/Beshore. | JPL · 196807 |

== 196901–197000 ==
back to top

| Named minor planet | Provisional | This minor planet was named for... | Ref · Catalog |
|---|---|---|---|
| 196938 Delgordon | 2003 UO_{20} | Del Gordon (born 1958), American software/systems engineer for Unmanned Aerial Vehicles at Northrop Grumman Corporation and an officer of the Huachuca Astronomy Club | JPL · 196938 |
| 196945 Guerin | 2003 UV_{29} | Georges Guerin (born 1934) is a retired philosophy professor. He is passionate about astronomy and has built his own observatory at La Ratonie in the Aveyron region of France. | JPL · 196945 |

back to top

| Preceded by 195,001–196,000 | Meanings of minor-planet names List of minor planets: 196,001–197,000 | Succeeded by 197,001–198,000 |
