= List of minor planets: 196001–197000 =

The following is a partial list of minor planets, running from minor-planet number 196001 through 197000, inclusive. The primary data for this and other partial lists is based on JPL's "Small-Body Orbital Elements" and data available from the Minor Planet Center. Critical list information is also provided by the MPC, unless otherwise specified from Lowell Observatory. A detailed description of the table's columns and additional sources are given on the main page including a complete list of every page in this series, and a statistical break-up on the dynamical classification of minor planets.

Also see the summary list of all named bodies in numerical and alphabetical order, and the corresponding naming citations for the number range of this particular list. New namings may only be added to this list after official publication, as the preannouncement of names is condemned by the Working Group for Small Bodies Nomenclature of the International Astronomical Union.

Near-Earth obj.	MBA (inner)	MBA (outer)	Centaur
Mars-crosser	MBA (middle)	Jupiter trojan	Trans-Neptunian obj.
Unclassified

== 196001–196100 ==
Designation			Discovery			Properties		Ref
Permanent	Provisional	Named after	Date	Site	Discoverer(s)	Category	Diam.	Ref
196001	2002 RX_{238}	—	September 13, 2002	Palomar	R. Matson	·	3.6 km	MPC · JPL
196002	2002 RU_{239}	—	September 1, 2002	Palomar	S. F. Hönig	·	4.7 km	MPC · JPL
196003	2002 RJ_{240}	—	September 14, 2002	Palomar	R. Matson	EOS	3.1 km	MPC · JPL
196004	2002 RN_{241}	—	September 15, 2002	Palomar	S. F. Hönig	·	3.3 km	MPC · JPL
196005 Róbertschiller	2002 RS_{241}	Róbertschiller	September 12, 2002	Piszkéstető	K. Sárneczky	·	4.2 km	MPC · JPL
196006	2002 RJ_{242}	—	September 14, 2002	Palomar	R. Matson	·	4.0 km	MPC · JPL
196007	2002 RT_{242}	—	September 13, 2002	Palomar	NEAT	·	3.6 km	MPC · JPL
196008	2002 RV_{242}	—	September 5, 2002	Haleakala	NEAT	VER	4.8 km	MPC · JPL
196009	2002 RF_{248}	—	September 13, 2002	Palomar	NEAT	·	3.7 km	MPC · JPL
196010	2002 RP_{248}	—	September 15, 2002	Palomar	NEAT	·	3.1 km	MPC · JPL
196011	2002 RR_{250}	—	September 3, 2002	Haleakala	NEAT	·	3.6 km	MPC · JPL
196012	2002 RY_{250}	—	September 9, 2002	Palomar	NEAT	EOS	2.7 km	MPC · JPL
196013	2002 RN_{254}	—	September 14, 2002	Palomar	NEAT	·	2.6 km	MPC · JPL
196014	2002 RV_{258}	—	September 14, 2002	Palomar	NEAT	·	950 m	MPC · JPL
196015	2002 RD_{263}	—	September 13, 2002	Palomar	NEAT	·	7.2 km	MPC · JPL
196016	2002 RE_{263}	—	September 13, 2002	Palomar	NEAT	EOS	3.6 km	MPC · JPL
196017	2002 RH_{273}	—	September 4, 2002	Palomar	NEAT	·	3.3 km	MPC · JPL
196018	2002 RP_{279}	—	September 15, 2002	Palomar	NEAT	·	2.0 km	MPC · JPL
196019	2002 SM_{1}	—	September 26, 2002	Palomar	NEAT	·	4.0 km	MPC · JPL
196020	2002 SC_{2}	—	September 26, 2002	Palomar	NEAT	(1298)	4.2 km	MPC · JPL
196021	2002 ST_{2}	—	September 27, 2002	Palomar	NEAT	H	1.4 km	MPC · JPL
196022	2002 SQ_{5}	—	September 27, 2002	Palomar	NEAT	·	4.0 km	MPC · JPL
196023	2002 SW_{6}	—	September 27, 2002	Palomar	NEAT	KOR	2.2 km	MPC · JPL
196024	2002 SB_{7}	—	September 27, 2002	Palomar	NEAT	VER	4.2 km	MPC · JPL
196025	2002 SP_{9}	—	September 27, 2002	Palomar	NEAT	·	3.4 km	MPC · JPL
196026	2002 SL_{13}	—	September 27, 2002	Anderson Mesa	LONEOS	·	5.7 km	MPC · JPL
196027	2002 SB_{14}	—	September 27, 2002	Palomar	NEAT	THM	3.9 km	MPC · JPL
196028	2002 SF_{14}	—	September 27, 2002	Palomar	NEAT	·	3.1 km	MPC · JPL
196029	2002 SL_{14}	—	September 27, 2002	Palomar	NEAT	·	3.7 km	MPC · JPL
196030	2002 SJ_{20}	—	September 26, 2002	Palomar	NEAT	·	5.2 km	MPC · JPL
196031	2002 SV_{20}	—	September 26, 2002	Palomar	NEAT	THM	3.2 km	MPC · JPL
196032	2002 SH_{21}	—	September 26, 2002	Palomar	NEAT	·	4.4 km	MPC · JPL
196033	2002 SU_{21}	—	September 26, 2002	Palomar	NEAT	THM	3.8 km	MPC · JPL
196034	2002 SV_{25}	—	September 28, 2002	Haleakala	NEAT	·	6.9 km	MPC · JPL
196035 Haraldbill	2002 SZ_{27}	Haraldbill	September 30, 2002	Michael Adrian	Kretlow, M.	EUP	5.4 km	MPC · JPL
196036	2002 SL_{40}	—	September 30, 2002	Haleakala	NEAT	T_{j} (2.99) · EUP	5.7 km	MPC · JPL
196037	2002 SX_{42}	—	September 28, 2002	Haleakala	NEAT	·	5.0 km	MPC · JPL
196038	2002 SM_{43}	—	September 28, 2002	Haleakala	NEAT	·	4.7 km	MPC · JPL
196039	2002 SS_{44}	—	September 29, 2002	Haleakala	NEAT	·	5.9 km	MPC · JPL
196040	2002 SC_{45}	—	September 29, 2002	Haleakala	NEAT	·	4.4 km	MPC · JPL
196041	2002 SO_{48}	—	September 30, 2002	Socorro	LINEAR	·	5.3 km	MPC · JPL
196042	2002 SD_{49}	—	September 30, 2002	Socorro	LINEAR	·	6.6 km	MPC · JPL
196043	2002 ST_{49}	—	September 30, 2002	Socorro	LINEAR	·	4.7 km	MPC · JPL
196044	2002 SU_{50}	—	September 30, 2002	Socorro	LINEAR	·	4.8 km	MPC · JPL
196045	2002 SN_{53}	—	September 19, 2002	Anderson Mesa	LONEOS	·	6.2 km	MPC · JPL
196046	2002 SE_{56}	—	September 30, 2002	Socorro	LINEAR	·	4.6 km	MPC · JPL
196047	2002 SS_{57}	—	September 30, 2002	Haleakala	NEAT	·	6.7 km	MPC · JPL
196048	2002 SM_{60}	—	September 16, 2002	Palomar	NEAT	·	5.0 km	MPC · JPL
196049	2002 SS_{61}	—	September 17, 2002	Palomar	NEAT	·	5.8 km	MPC · JPL
196050	2002 SG_{63}	—	September 16, 2002	Palomar	R. Matson	·	4.4 km	MPC · JPL
196051	2002 SW_{65}	—	September 16, 2002	Palomar	NEAT	·	4.2 km	MPC · JPL
196052	2002 SB_{66}	—	September 16, 2002	Palomar	NEAT	·	4.4 km	MPC · JPL
196053	2002 SE_{68}	—	September 26, 2002	Palomar	NEAT	·	3.0 km	MPC · JPL
196054	2002 TK	—	October 1, 2002	Anderson Mesa	LONEOS	CYB	6.2 km	MPC · JPL
196055	2002 TC_{1}	—	October 1, 2002	Anderson Mesa	LONEOS	·	4.1 km	MPC · JPL
196056	2002 TK_{2}	—	October 1, 2002	Anderson Mesa	LONEOS	·	6.0 km	MPC · JPL
196057	2002 TN_{12}	—	October 1, 2002	Anderson Mesa	LONEOS	·	4.2 km	MPC · JPL
196058	2002 TU_{15}	—	October 2, 2002	Socorro	LINEAR	·	5.4 km	MPC · JPL
196059	2002 TT_{16}	—	October 2, 2002	Socorro	LINEAR	·	6.0 km	MPC · JPL
196060	2002 TD_{20}	—	October 2, 2002	Socorro	LINEAR	·	6.2 km	MPC · JPL
196061	2002 TC_{26}	—	October 2, 2002	Socorro	LINEAR	·	4.9 km	MPC · JPL
196062	2002 TN_{33}	—	October 2, 2002	Socorro	LINEAR	·	5.5 km	MPC · JPL
196063	2002 TD_{34}	—	October 2, 2002	Socorro	LINEAR	·	4.6 km	MPC · JPL
196064	2002 TG_{34}	—	October 2, 2002	Socorro	LINEAR	·	6.7 km	MPC · JPL
196065	2002 TK_{38}	—	October 2, 2002	Socorro	LINEAR	·	6.1 km	MPC · JPL
196066	2002 TH_{45}	—	October 2, 2002	Haleakala	NEAT	LUT	6.9 km	MPC · JPL
196067	2002 TF_{55}	—	October 2, 2002	Haleakala	NEAT	EOS	3.3 km	MPC · JPL
196068	2002 TW_{55}	—	October 2, 2002	Socorro	LINEAR	T_{j} (2.94) · APO +1km · PHA	840 m	MPC · JPL
196069	2002 TY_{62}	—	October 3, 2002	Campo Imperatore	CINEOS	·	5.3 km	MPC · JPL
196070	2002 TA_{65}	—	October 2, 2002	Kvistaberg	Uppsala-DLR Asteroid Survey	·	5.1 km	MPC · JPL
196071	2002 TE_{65}	—	October 2, 2002	Kvistaberg	Uppsala-DLR Asteroid Survey	·	5.9 km	MPC · JPL
196072	2002 TE_{69}	—	October 9, 2002	Socorro	LINEAR	T_{j} (2.99) · EUP	7.6 km	MPC · JPL
196073	2002 TQ_{74}	—	October 1, 2002	Anderson Mesa	LONEOS	·	5.4 km	MPC · JPL
196074	2002 TT_{74}	—	October 1, 2002	Anderson Mesa	LONEOS	·	5.4 km	MPC · JPL
196075	2002 TD_{76}	—	October 1, 2002	Anderson Mesa	LONEOS	·	5.0 km	MPC · JPL
196076	2002 TL_{77}	—	October 1, 2002	Anderson Mesa	LONEOS	·	4.7 km	MPC · JPL
196077	2002 TT_{79}	—	October 1, 2002	Socorro	LINEAR	T_{j} (2.98) · EUP	6.9 km	MPC · JPL
196078	2002 TH_{80}	—	October 1, 2002	Anderson Mesa	LONEOS	·	6.8 km	MPC · JPL
196079	2002 TN_{81}	—	October 1, 2002	Haleakala	NEAT	·	6.5 km	MPC · JPL
196080	2002 TX_{83}	—	October 2, 2002	Haleakala	NEAT	THB	5.5 km	MPC · JPL
196081	2002 TO_{84}	—	October 2, 2002	Haleakala	NEAT	(11097) · CYB	5.5 km	MPC · JPL
196082	2002 TB_{86}	—	October 2, 2002	Campo Imperatore	CINEOS	·	4.2 km	MPC · JPL
196083	2002 TH_{87}	—	October 3, 2002	Socorro	LINEAR	·	5.4 km	MPC · JPL
196084	2002 TH_{88}	—	October 3, 2002	Palomar	NEAT	·	5.0 km	MPC · JPL
196085	2002 TU_{88}	—	October 3, 2002	Palomar	NEAT	·	5.4 km	MPC · JPL
196086	2002 TD_{90}	—	October 3, 2002	Palomar	NEAT	·	5.2 km	MPC · JPL
196087	2002 TU_{96}	—	October 1, 2002	Anderson Mesa	LONEOS	·	5.5 km	MPC · JPL
196088	2002 TR_{99}	—	October 4, 2002	Socorro	LINEAR	·	4.7 km	MPC · JPL
196089	2002 TB_{102}	—	October 4, 2002	Socorro	LINEAR	·	4.4 km	MPC · JPL
196090	2002 TS_{102}	—	October 4, 2002	Socorro	LINEAR	EOS	7.0 km	MPC · JPL
196091	2002 TG_{103}	—	October 4, 2002	Socorro	LINEAR	·	5.6 km	MPC · JPL
196092	2002 TH_{113}	—	October 3, 2002	Palomar	NEAT	·	6.4 km	MPC · JPL
196093	2002 TW_{113}	—	October 3, 2002	Palomar	NEAT	·	8.1 km	MPC · JPL
196094	2002 TT_{117}	—	October 3, 2002	Palomar	NEAT	·	6.0 km	MPC · JPL
196095	2002 TR_{119}	—	October 3, 2002	Palomar	NEAT	EOS	4.6 km	MPC · JPL
196096	2002 TK_{120}	—	October 3, 2002	Palomar	NEAT	·	5.4 km	MPC · JPL
196097	2002 TP_{123}	—	October 4, 2002	Palomar	NEAT	·	4.8 km	MPC · JPL
196098	2002 TW_{123}	—	October 4, 2002	Palomar	NEAT	·	7.2 km	MPC · JPL
196099	2002 TE_{125}	—	October 4, 2002	Palomar	NEAT	·	5.7 km	MPC · JPL
196100	2002 TZ_{126}	—	October 4, 2002	Socorro	LINEAR	HYG	6.4 km	MPC · JPL

== 196101–196200 ==
back to top

Designation			Discovery			Properties		Ref
Permanent	Provisional	Named after	Date	Site	Discoverer(s)	Category	Diam.	Ref
196101	2002 TD_{127}	—	October 4, 2002	Palomar	NEAT	·	3.8 km	MPC · JPL
196102	2002 TA_{133}	—	October 4, 2002	Socorro	LINEAR	·	6.2 km	MPC · JPL
196103	2002 TX_{133}	—	October 4, 2002	Socorro	LINEAR	CYB	7.3 km	MPC · JPL
196104	2002 TC_{134}	—	October 4, 2002	Palomar	NEAT	·	8.1 km	MPC · JPL
196105	2002 TC_{137}	—	October 4, 2002	Anderson Mesa	LONEOS	·	6.0 km	MPC · JPL
196106	2002 TV_{142}	—	October 4, 2002	Socorro	LINEAR	HYG	4.7 km	MPC · JPL
196107	2002 TH_{145}	—	October 3, 2002	Socorro	LINEAR	·	3.5 km	MPC · JPL
196108	2002 TX_{147}	—	October 5, 2002	Palomar	NEAT	·	5.9 km	MPC · JPL
196109	2002 TS_{148}	—	October 5, 2002	Palomar	NEAT	·	4.6 km	MPC · JPL
196110	2002 TB_{157}	—	October 5, 2002	Palomar	NEAT	·	2.9 km	MPC · JPL
196111	2002 TM_{168}	—	October 3, 2002	Socorro	LINEAR	T_{j} (2.99)	6.2 km	MPC · JPL
196112	2002 TH_{169}	—	October 3, 2002	Palomar	NEAT	·	7.8 km	MPC · JPL
196113	2002 TY_{169}	—	October 3, 2002	Palomar	NEAT	·	8.7 km	MPC · JPL
196114	2002 TD_{170}	—	October 3, 2002	Palomar	NEAT	·	5.7 km	MPC · JPL
196115	2002 TN_{170}	—	October 3, 2002	Palomar	NEAT	NAE	5.7 km	MPC · JPL
196116	2002 TY_{170}	—	October 3, 2002	Palomar	NEAT	·	5.9 km	MPC · JPL
196117	2002 TE_{173}	—	October 4, 2002	Socorro	LINEAR	·	5.6 km	MPC · JPL
196118	2002 TY_{173}	—	October 4, 2002	Socorro	LINEAR	·	4.9 km	MPC · JPL
196119	2002 TO_{174}	—	October 4, 2002	Socorro	LINEAR	EOS	4.1 km	MPC · JPL
196120	2002 TA_{178}	—	October 11, 2002	Palomar	NEAT	·	8.7 km	MPC · JPL
196121	2002 TW_{185}	—	October 4, 2002	Socorro	LINEAR	·	6.4 km	MPC · JPL
196122	2002 TL_{193}	—	October 3, 2002	Socorro	LINEAR	·	4.3 km	MPC · JPL
196123	2002 TN_{193}	—	October 3, 2002	Socorro	LINEAR	·	6.7 km	MPC · JPL
196124	2002 TU_{194}	—	October 3, 2002	Socorro	LINEAR	·	3.6 km	MPC · JPL
196125	2002 TM_{202}	—	October 4, 2002	Socorro	LINEAR	EMA	5.4 km	MPC · JPL
196126	2002 TE_{206}	—	October 4, 2002	Socorro	LINEAR	·	4.3 km	MPC · JPL
196127	2002 TP_{206}	—	October 4, 2002	Socorro	LINEAR	·	6.1 km	MPC · JPL
196128	2002 TQ_{206}	—	October 4, 2002	Socorro	LINEAR	·	8.2 km	MPC · JPL
196129	2002 TT_{210}	—	October 7, 2002	Socorro	LINEAR	·	5.1 km	MPC · JPL
196130	2002 TK_{213}	—	October 3, 2002	Socorro	LINEAR	·	4.2 km	MPC · JPL
196131	2002 TE_{225}	—	October 8, 2002	Anderson Mesa	LONEOS	EOS	4.8 km	MPC · JPL
196132	2002 TG_{231}	—	October 8, 2002	Palomar	NEAT	·	7.7 km	MPC · JPL
196133	2002 TO_{238}	—	October 7, 2002	Socorro	LINEAR	·	5.1 km	MPC · JPL
196134	2002 TH_{240}	—	October 9, 2002	Socorro	LINEAR	VER	4.0 km	MPC · JPL
196135	2002 TZ_{244}	—	October 7, 2002	Socorro	LINEAR	·	6.4 km	MPC · JPL
196136	2002 TW_{247}	—	October 7, 2002	Palomar	NEAT	·	4.8 km	MPC · JPL
196137	2002 TR_{248}	—	October 7, 2002	Socorro	LINEAR	·	6.3 km	MPC · JPL
196138	2002 TX_{253}	—	October 9, 2002	Socorro	LINEAR	·	6.7 km	MPC · JPL
196139	2002 TW_{261}	—	October 10, 2002	Palomar	NEAT	KOR	2.2 km	MPC · JPL
196140	2002 TO_{264}	—	October 10, 2002	Socorro	LINEAR	·	4.4 km	MPC · JPL
196141	2002 TL_{268}	—	October 9, 2002	Socorro	LINEAR	·	6.5 km	MPC · JPL
196142	2002 TB_{270}	—	October 9, 2002	Socorro	LINEAR	·	3.5 km	MPC · JPL
196143	2002 TZ_{270}	—	October 9, 2002	Socorro	LINEAR	EOS	3.2 km	MPC · JPL
196144	2002 TE_{274}	—	October 9, 2002	Socorro	LINEAR	·	4.9 km	MPC · JPL
196145	2002 TU_{279}	—	October 10, 2002	Socorro	LINEAR	SYL · CYB	8.4 km	MPC · JPL
196146	2002 TY_{281}	—	October 10, 2002	Socorro	LINEAR	·	5.2 km	MPC · JPL
196147	2002 TX_{294}	—	October 13, 2002	Palomar	NEAT	·	4.9 km	MPC · JPL
196148	2002 TE_{317}	—	October 5, 2002	Apache Point	SDSS	EOS	3.0 km	MPC · JPL
196149	2002 TG_{319}	—	October 5, 2002	Apache Point	SDSS	·	2.9 km	MPC · JPL
196150	2002 TT_{337}	—	October 5, 2002	Apache Point	SDSS	·	1.2 km	MPC · JPL
196151	2002 UG_{7}	—	October 28, 2002	Palomar	NEAT	LUT	6.4 km	MPC · JPL
196152	2002 UG_{9}	—	October 28, 2002	Palomar	NEAT	·	3.4 km	MPC · JPL
196153	2002 UO_{31}	—	October 30, 2002	Haleakala	NEAT	EOS	3.6 km	MPC · JPL
196154	2002 UH_{47}	—	October 31, 2002	Socorro	LINEAR	·	7.4 km	MPC · JPL
196155	2002 UJ_{51}	—	October 29, 2002	Apache Point	SDSS	·	6.4 km	MPC · JPL
196156	2002 UM_{61}	—	October 30, 2002	Apache Point	SDSS	EOS	2.8 km	MPC · JPL
196157	2002 UV_{61}	—	October 30, 2002	Apache Point	SDSS	·	4.2 km	MPC · JPL
196158	2002 VV_{8}	—	November 1, 2002	Socorro	LINEAR	THB	7.2 km	MPC · JPL
196159	2002 VT_{17}	—	November 7, 2002	Socorro	LINEAR	(260) · CYB	6.5 km	MPC · JPL
196160	2002 VW_{26}	—	November 5, 2002	Socorro	LINEAR	CYB	7.3 km	MPC · JPL
196161	2002 VM_{37}	—	November 4, 2002	Palomar	NEAT	CYB	5.6 km	MPC · JPL
196162	2002 VW_{41}	—	November 5, 2002	Palomar	NEAT	·	840 m	MPC · JPL
196163	2002 VD_{43}	—	November 4, 2002	Palomar	NEAT	SYL · CYB	6.7 km	MPC · JPL
196164	2002 VZ_{46}	—	November 5, 2002	Palomar	NEAT	·	4.8 km	MPC · JPL
196165	2002 VV_{51}	—	November 6, 2002	Anderson Mesa	LONEOS	·	3.9 km	MPC · JPL
196166	2002 VE_{54}	—	November 6, 2002	Socorro	LINEAR	·	6.1 km	MPC · JPL
196167	2002 VO_{57}	—	November 6, 2002	Haleakala	NEAT	·	4.3 km	MPC · JPL
196168	2002 VW_{62}	—	November 6, 2002	Socorro	LINEAR	·	7.0 km	MPC · JPL
196169	2002 VF_{69}	—	November 8, 2002	Socorro	LINEAR	·	7.9 km	MPC · JPL
196170	2002 VZ_{80}	—	November 7, 2002	Socorro	LINEAR	·	5.1 km	MPC · JPL
196171	2002 VH_{96}	—	November 11, 2002	Socorro	LINEAR	·	5.2 km	MPC · JPL
196172	2002 VZ_{99}	—	November 10, 2002	Socorro	LINEAR	EUP	9.9 km	MPC · JPL
196173	2002 VT_{118}	—	November 12, 2002	Socorro	LINEAR	EUP	7.6 km	MPC · JPL
196174	2002 WQ_{11}	—	November 28, 2002	Anderson Mesa	LONEOS	·	1.9 km	MPC · JPL
196175	2002 XR_{2}	—	December 1, 2002	Socorro	LINEAR	·	820 m	MPC · JPL
196176	2002 XQ_{6}	—	December 1, 2002	Haleakala	NEAT	·	3.9 km	MPC · JPL
196177	2002 XY_{7}	—	December 2, 2002	Socorro	LINEAR	·	5.5 km	MPC · JPL
196178	2002 XA_{49}	—	December 10, 2002	Socorro	LINEAR	·	6.2 km	MPC · JPL
196179	2002 XZ_{60}	—	December 10, 2002	Socorro	LINEAR	THM	5.2 km	MPC · JPL
196180	2002 XH_{86}	—	December 11, 2002	Socorro	LINEAR	·	1.4 km	MPC · JPL
196181	2002 XE_{116}	—	December 7, 2002	Apache Point	SDSS	·	1.1 km	MPC · JPL
196182	2002 YP_{10}	—	December 31, 2002	Socorro	LINEAR	·	900 m	MPC · JPL
196183	2002 YQ_{11}	—	December 31, 2002	Socorro	LINEAR	·	1.4 km	MPC · JPL
196184	2002 YP_{13}	—	December 31, 2002	Socorro	LINEAR	·	1.2 km	MPC · JPL
196185	2002 YB_{29}	—	December 31, 2002	Socorro	LINEAR	·	960 m	MPC · JPL
196186	2002 YF_{31}	—	December 31, 2002	Socorro	LINEAR	HYG	5.3 km	MPC · JPL
196187	2002 YB_{32}	—	December 31, 2002	Kitt Peak	Spacewatch	·	980 m	MPC · JPL
196188	2003 AS_{4}	—	January 1, 2003	Kingsnake	J. V. McClusky	·	3.0 km	MPC · JPL
196189	2003 AG_{28}	—	January 4, 2003	Socorro	LINEAR	·	5.6 km	MPC · JPL
196190	2003 AC_{29}	—	January 4, 2003	Socorro	LINEAR	·	1.2 km	MPC · JPL
196191	2003 AX_{34}	—	January 7, 2003	Socorro	LINEAR	·	1.0 km	MPC · JPL
196192	2003 AN_{39}	—	January 7, 2003	Socorro	LINEAR	·	1.3 km	MPC · JPL
196193	2003 AD_{40}	—	January 7, 2003	Socorro	LINEAR	·	1.2 km	MPC · JPL
196194	2003 AZ_{43}	—	January 5, 2003	Socorro	LINEAR	·	1.3 km	MPC · JPL
196195	2003 AW_{49}	—	January 5, 2003	Socorro	LINEAR	·	4.5 km	MPC · JPL
196196	2003 AU_{57}	—	January 5, 2003	Socorro	LINEAR	·	1.2 km	MPC · JPL
196197	2003 AC_{75}	—	January 10, 2003	Socorro	LINEAR	·	1.3 km	MPC · JPL
196198	2003 AF_{94}	—	January 5, 2003	Socorro	LINEAR	·	1.4 km	MPC · JPL
196199	2003 BA	—	January 16, 2003	Palomar	NEAT	·	1.4 km	MPC · JPL
196200	2003 BZ_{1}	—	January 25, 2003	Anderson Mesa	LONEOS	·	8.9 km	MPC · JPL

== 196201–196300 ==
back to top

Designation			Discovery			Properties		Ref
Permanent	Provisional	Named after	Date	Site	Discoverer(s)	Category	Diam.	Ref
196201	2003 BP_{7}	—	January 26, 2003	Kitt Peak	Spacewatch	·	1.0 km	MPC · JPL
196202	2003 BL_{9}	—	January 26, 2003	Palomar	NEAT	·	1.5 km	MPC · JPL
196203	2003 BB_{10}	—	January 26, 2003	Palomar	NEAT	·	2.5 km	MPC · JPL
196204	2003 BQ_{12}	—	January 26, 2003	Anderson Mesa	LONEOS	·	1.1 km	MPC · JPL
196205	2003 BQ_{15}	—	January 26, 2003	Anderson Mesa	LONEOS	·	1.3 km	MPC · JPL
196206	2003 BM_{17}	—	January 26, 2003	Haleakala	NEAT	·	1.2 km	MPC · JPL
196207	2003 BC_{19}	—	January 27, 2003	Palomar	NEAT	·	1.3 km	MPC · JPL
196208	2003 BG_{20}	—	January 27, 2003	Anderson Mesa	LONEOS	·	1.1 km	MPC · JPL
196209	2003 BY_{21}	—	January 27, 2003	Socorro	LINEAR	·	1.7 km	MPC · JPL
196210	2003 BM_{25}	—	January 25, 2003	Palomar	NEAT	·	1.5 km	MPC · JPL
196211	2003 BT_{30}	—	January 27, 2003	Socorro	LINEAR	·	2.3 km	MPC · JPL
196212	2003 BV_{31}	—	January 27, 2003	Socorro	LINEAR	·	980 m	MPC · JPL
196213	2003 BL_{32}	—	January 27, 2003	Socorro	LINEAR	·	1.0 km	MPC · JPL
196214	2003 BD_{37}	—	January 28, 2003	Kitt Peak	Spacewatch	·	2.5 km	MPC · JPL
196215	2003 BG_{38}	—	January 27, 2003	Anderson Mesa	LONEOS	·	1.4 km	MPC · JPL
196216	2003 BA_{42}	—	January 27, 2003	Socorro	LINEAR	·	1 km	MPC · JPL
196217	2003 BR_{42}	—	January 29, 2003	Palomar	NEAT	·	5.1 km	MPC · JPL
196218	2003 BH_{44}	—	January 27, 2003	Socorro	LINEAR	·	1.6 km	MPC · JPL
196219	2003 BF_{46}	—	January 27, 2003	Socorro	LINEAR	·	1.0 km	MPC · JPL
196220	2003 BK_{51}	—	January 27, 2003	Socorro	LINEAR	·	1 km	MPC · JPL
196221	2003 BM_{52}	—	January 27, 2003	Socorro	LINEAR	·	1.0 km	MPC · JPL
196222	2003 BW_{52}	—	January 27, 2003	Anderson Mesa	LONEOS	·	2.0 km	MPC · JPL
196223	2003 BO_{53}	—	January 27, 2003	Socorro	LINEAR	·	850 m	MPC · JPL
196224	2003 BA_{55}	—	January 27, 2003	Haleakala	NEAT	·	2.1 km	MPC · JPL
196225	2003 BD_{57}	—	January 27, 2003	Socorro	LINEAR	·	1 km	MPC · JPL
196226	2003 BS_{61}	—	January 28, 2003	Socorro	LINEAR	·	2.1 km	MPC · JPL
196227	2003 BR_{63}	—	January 28, 2003	Palomar	NEAT	·	1.1 km	MPC · JPL
196228	2003 BM_{64}	—	January 29, 2003	Palomar	NEAT	·	940 m	MPC · JPL
196229	2003 BC_{67}	—	January 30, 2003	Haleakala	NEAT	·	1.8 km	MPC · JPL
196230	2003 BO_{80}	—	January 31, 2003	Socorro	LINEAR	(2076)	1.6 km	MPC · JPL
196231	2003 BL_{82}	—	January 31, 2003	Socorro	LINEAR	·	1.0 km	MPC · JPL
196232	2003 BN_{84}	—	January 30, 2003	Anderson Mesa	LONEOS	NYS	1.2 km	MPC · JPL
196233	2003 BC_{92}	—	January 25, 2003	Kitt Peak	Spacewatch	·	690 m	MPC · JPL
196234	2003 CH_{2}	—	February 1, 2003	Socorro	LINEAR	·	1.2 km	MPC · JPL
196235	2003 CJ_{2}	—	February 1, 2003	Socorro	LINEAR	·	1.3 km	MPC · JPL
196236	2003 CV_{2}	—	February 2, 2003	Socorro	LINEAR	·	1.7 km	MPC · JPL
196237	2003 CL_{10}	—	February 2, 2003	Socorro	LINEAR	·	1.1 km	MPC · JPL
196238	2003 CY_{10}	—	February 3, 2003	Anderson Mesa	LONEOS	·	2.2 km	MPC · JPL
196239	2003 CZ_{17}	—	February 7, 2003	Desert Eagle	W. K. Y. Yeung	·	1.1 km	MPC · JPL
196240	2003 CH_{18}	—	February 8, 2003	Socorro	LINEAR	·	1.1 km	MPC · JPL
196241	2003 CT_{19}	—	February 8, 2003	Socorro	LINEAR	(2076)	1.0 km	MPC · JPL
196242	2003 CV_{21}	—	February 3, 2003	Socorro	LINEAR	·	870 m	MPC · JPL
196243	2003 DS_{2}	—	February 22, 2003	Desert Eagle	W. K. Y. Yeung	·	1.4 km	MPC · JPL
196244	2003 DH_{8}	—	February 22, 2003	Palomar	NEAT	·	1.8 km	MPC · JPL
196245	2003 DB_{9}	—	February 24, 2003	Campo Imperatore	CINEOS	·	940 m	MPC · JPL
196246	2003 DL_{9}	—	February 24, 2003	Campo Imperatore	CINEOS	V	920 m	MPC · JPL
196247	2003 DP_{9}	—	February 25, 2003	Campo Imperatore	CINEOS	·	1.4 km	MPC · JPL
196248	2003 DX_{13}	—	February 26, 2003	Haleakala	NEAT	·	1.1 km	MPC · JPL
196249	2003 DA_{14}	—	February 26, 2003	Haleakala	NEAT	NYS	1.9 km	MPC · JPL
196250	2003 DN_{17}	—	February 22, 2003	Goodricke-Pigott	Kessel, J. W.	·	2.1 km	MPC · JPL
196251	2003 DL_{21}	—	February 23, 2003	Anderson Mesa	LONEOS	V	1.1 km	MPC · JPL
196252	2003 DY_{23}	—	February 23, 2003	Anderson Mesa	LONEOS	·	1.7 km	MPC · JPL
196253	2003 DC_{24}	—	February 22, 2003	Palomar	NEAT	V	1.0 km	MPC · JPL
196254	2003 DU_{24}	—	February 23, 2003	Kitt Peak	Spacewatch	·	1.2 km	MPC · JPL
196255	2003 EZ	—	March 5, 2003	Socorro	LINEAR	·	3.1 km	MPC · JPL
196256	2003 EH_{1}	—	March 6, 2003	Anderson Mesa	LONEOS	T_{j} (2.06) · AMO +1km	2.1 km	MPC · JPL
196257	2003 EM_{3}	—	March 6, 2003	Socorro	LINEAR	·	2.4 km	MPC · JPL
196258	2003 EM_{5}	—	March 5, 2003	Socorro	LINEAR	NYS	1.7 km	MPC · JPL
196259	2003 ED_{6}	—	March 6, 2003	Anderson Mesa	LONEOS	·	1.3 km	MPC · JPL
196260	2003 EE_{7}	—	March 6, 2003	Anderson Mesa	LONEOS	·	1.1 km	MPC · JPL
196261	2003 EQ_{9}	—	March 6, 2003	Anderson Mesa	LONEOS	·	1.4 km	MPC · JPL
196262	2003 EK_{10}	—	March 6, 2003	Socorro	LINEAR	·	2.6 km	MPC · JPL
196263	2003 EW_{10}	—	March 6, 2003	Socorro	LINEAR	·	1.4 km	MPC · JPL
196264	2003 EE_{11}	—	March 6, 2003	Socorro	LINEAR	·	1.7 km	MPC · JPL
196265	2003 EF_{11}	—	March 6, 2003	Socorro	LINEAR	·	2.4 km	MPC · JPL
196266	2003 EC_{12}	—	March 6, 2003	Socorro	LINEAR	·	1.4 km	MPC · JPL
196267	2003 EF_{12}	—	March 6, 2003	Socorro	LINEAR	·	2.5 km	MPC · JPL
196268	2003 ES_{15}	—	March 7, 2003	Socorro	LINEAR	·	1.4 km	MPC · JPL
196269	2003 EG_{17}	—	March 5, 2003	Socorro	LINEAR	·	1.4 km	MPC · JPL
196270	2003 EK_{19}	—	March 6, 2003	Anderson Mesa	LONEOS	·	1.9 km	MPC · JPL
196271	2003 ED_{20}	—	March 6, 2003	Anderson Mesa	LONEOS	·	1.0 km	MPC · JPL
196272	2003 EE_{21}	—	March 6, 2003	Anderson Mesa	LONEOS	·	1.7 km	MPC · JPL
196273	2003 EC_{22}	—	March 6, 2003	Socorro	LINEAR	·	1.3 km	MPC · JPL
196274	2003 ET_{22}	—	March 6, 2003	Socorro	LINEAR	·	1.4 km	MPC · JPL
196275	2003 EJ_{23}	—	March 6, 2003	Socorro	LINEAR	·	1.6 km	MPC · JPL
196276	2003 EP_{24}	—	March 6, 2003	Socorro	LINEAR	·	2.5 km	MPC · JPL
196277	2003 EH_{26}	—	March 6, 2003	Anderson Mesa	LONEOS	·	1.9 km	MPC · JPL
196278	2003 ES_{26}	—	March 6, 2003	Anderson Mesa	LONEOS	·	2.1 km	MPC · JPL
196279	2003 ET_{28}	—	March 6, 2003	Socorro	LINEAR	·	3.0 km	MPC · JPL
196280	2003 EL_{29}	—	March 6, 2003	Socorro	LINEAR	·	1.7 km	MPC · JPL
196281	2003 EM_{29}	—	March 6, 2003	Socorro	LINEAR	·	1.6 km	MPC · JPL
196282	2003 EX_{31}	—	March 7, 2003	Socorro	LINEAR	(2076)	1.6 km	MPC · JPL
196283	2003 ES_{33}	—	March 7, 2003	Anderson Mesa	LONEOS	(2076)	1.4 km	MPC · JPL
196284	2003 EO_{36}	—	March 7, 2003	Anderson Mesa	LONEOS	MAS	890 m	MPC · JPL
196285	2003 ET_{41}	—	March 6, 2003	Socorro	LINEAR	·	2.0 km	MPC · JPL
196286	2003 ED_{45}	—	March 7, 2003	Socorro	LINEAR	·	1.1 km	MPC · JPL
196287	2003 EQ_{45}	—	March 7, 2003	Socorro	LINEAR	·	1.9 km	MPC · JPL
196288	2003 EU_{48}	—	March 9, 2003	Socorro	LINEAR	NYS	2.0 km	MPC · JPL
196289	2003 EZ_{48}	—	March 9, 2003	Socorro	LINEAR	·	1.8 km	MPC · JPL
196290	2003 EP_{49}	—	March 10, 2003	Anderson Mesa	LONEOS	·	1.1 km	MPC · JPL
196291	2003 EP_{50}	—	March 9, 2003	Socorro	LINEAR	·	2.4 km	MPC · JPL
196292	2003 ES_{52}	—	March 8, 2003	Socorro	LINEAR	·	1.6 km	MPC · JPL
196293	2003 EV_{58}	—	March 11, 2003	Palomar	NEAT	·	1.6 km	MPC · JPL
196294	2003 ER_{59}	—	March 12, 2003	Palomar	NEAT	PHO	5.1 km	MPC · JPL
196295	2003 EP_{61}	—	March 6, 2003	Anderson Mesa	LONEOS	·	1.2 km	MPC · JPL
196296	2003 EY_{61}	—	March 12, 2003	Kitt Peak	Spacewatch	·	1.4 km	MPC · JPL
196297	2003 FA	—	March 21, 2003	Wrightwood	J. W. Young	PHO	1.0 km	MPC · JPL
196298	2003 FQ	—	March 22, 2003	Kleť	J. Tichá, M. Tichý	·	1.8 km	MPC · JPL
196299	2003 FN_{1}	—	March 24, 2003	Haleakala	NEAT	·	1.6 km	MPC · JPL
196300	2003 FW_{3}	—	March 23, 2003	Haleakala	NEAT	·	1.9 km	MPC · JPL

== 196301–196400 ==
back to top

Designation			Discovery			Properties		Ref
Permanent	Provisional	Named after	Date	Site	Discoverer(s)	Category	Diam.	Ref
196301	2003 FG_{6}	—	March 27, 2003	Campo Imperatore	CINEOS	V	1.1 km	MPC · JPL
196302	2003 FJ_{10}	—	March 23, 2003	Kitt Peak	Spacewatch	·	1.0 km	MPC · JPL
196303	2003 FG_{12}	—	March 24, 2003	Kitt Peak	Spacewatch	·	2.1 km	MPC · JPL
196304	2003 FY_{14}	—	March 23, 2003	Catalina	CSS	·	2.4 km	MPC · JPL
196305	2003 FN_{15}	—	March 23, 2003	Kitt Peak	Spacewatch	NYS	1.5 km	MPC · JPL
196306	2003 FT_{16}	—	March 23, 2003	Haleakala	NEAT	·	1.3 km	MPC · JPL
196307	2003 FL_{19}	—	March 25, 2003	Palomar	NEAT	·	1.6 km	MPC · JPL
196308	2003 FX_{23}	—	March 23, 2003	Kitt Peak	Spacewatch	MAS	1.1 km	MPC · JPL
196309	2003 FD_{24}	—	March 23, 2003	Kitt Peak	Spacewatch	·	1.5 km	MPC · JPL
196310	2003 FO_{24}	—	March 23, 2003	Haleakala	NEAT	·	1.4 km	MPC · JPL
196311	2003 FV_{28}	—	March 24, 2003	Haleakala	NEAT	·	1.6 km	MPC · JPL
196312	2003 FB_{29}	—	March 24, 2003	Haleakala	NEAT	·	1.2 km	MPC · JPL
196313	2003 FF_{31}	—	March 23, 2003	Palomar	NEAT	·	880 m	MPC · JPL
196314	2003 FF_{34}	—	March 23, 2003	Kitt Peak	Spacewatch	·	1.9 km	MPC · JPL
196315	2003 FR_{34}	—	March 23, 2003	Kitt Peak	Spacewatch	·	2.0 km	MPC · JPL
196316	2003 FZ_{34}	—	March 23, 2003	Kitt Peak	Spacewatch	L4	10 km	MPC · JPL
196317	2003 FR_{37}	—	March 23, 2003	Kitt Peak	Spacewatch	·	1.7 km	MPC · JPL
196318	2003 FZ_{37}	—	March 23, 2003	Kitt Peak	Spacewatch	L4	10 km	MPC · JPL
196319	2003 FB_{39}	—	March 23, 2003	Haleakala	NEAT	NYS	1.6 km	MPC · JPL
196320	2003 FE_{40}	—	March 24, 2003	Kitt Peak	Spacewatch	·	1.6 km	MPC · JPL
196321	2003 FU_{41}	—	March 25, 2003	Haleakala	NEAT	·	2.0 km	MPC · JPL
196322	2003 FY_{41}	—	March 26, 2003	Kitt Peak	Spacewatch	NYS · fast	2.0 km	MPC · JPL
196323	2003 FT_{42}	—	March 23, 2003	Kitt Peak	Spacewatch	·	2.4 km	MPC · JPL
196324	2003 FV_{43}	—	March 23, 2003	Kitt Peak	Spacewatch	V	1.1 km	MPC · JPL
196325	2003 FL_{47}	—	March 24, 2003	Kitt Peak	Spacewatch	MAS	990 m	MPC · JPL
196326	2003 FM_{49}	—	March 24, 2003	Haleakala	NEAT	·	1.3 km	MPC · JPL
196327	2003 FE_{51}	—	March 25, 2003	Palomar	NEAT	·	1.1 km	MPC · JPL
196328	2003 FB_{54}	—	March 25, 2003	Haleakala	NEAT	·	1.3 km	MPC · JPL
196329	2003 FW_{54}	—	March 25, 2003	Haleakala	NEAT	·	1.4 km	MPC · JPL
196330	2003 FN_{55}	—	March 26, 2003	Palomar	NEAT	·	1.2 km	MPC · JPL
196331	2003 FY_{56}	—	March 26, 2003	Palomar	NEAT	MAS	1 km	MPC · JPL
196332	2003 FM_{58}	—	March 26, 2003	Palomar	NEAT	·	1.4 km	MPC · JPL
196333	2003 FS_{60}	—	March 26, 2003	Palomar	NEAT	·	1.7 km	MPC · JPL
196334	2003 FM_{64}	—	March 26, 2003	Palomar	NEAT	·	2.4 km	MPC · JPL
196335	2003 FH_{68}	—	March 26, 2003	Palomar	NEAT	·	1.8 km	MPC · JPL
196336	2003 FN_{71}	—	March 26, 2003	Kitt Peak	Spacewatch	·	1.7 km	MPC · JPL
196337	2003 FG_{73}	—	March 26, 2003	Haleakala	NEAT	·	2.5 km	MPC · JPL
196338	2003 FB_{74}	—	March 26, 2003	Haleakala	NEAT	·	3.0 km	MPC · JPL
196339	2003 FM_{76}	—	March 27, 2003	Palomar	NEAT	NYS	1.4 km	MPC · JPL
196340	2003 FH_{78}	—	March 27, 2003	Kitt Peak	Spacewatch	·	1.9 km	MPC · JPL
196341	2003 FV_{78}	—	March 27, 2003	Kitt Peak	Spacewatch	·	2.0 km	MPC · JPL
196342	2003 FP_{79}	—	March 27, 2003	Socorro	LINEAR	V	1.6 km	MPC · JPL
196343	2003 FA_{83}	—	March 27, 2003	Palomar	NEAT	·	2.2 km	MPC · JPL
196344	2003 FJ_{83}	—	March 27, 2003	Palomar	NEAT	·	1.3 km	MPC · JPL
196345	2003 FB_{84}	—	March 28, 2003	Kitt Peak	Spacewatch	·	2.7 km	MPC · JPL
196346	2003 FU_{88}	—	March 28, 2003	Anderson Mesa	LONEOS	·	4.8 km	MPC · JPL
196347	2003 FA_{89}	—	March 29, 2003	Anderson Mesa	LONEOS	·	1.6 km	MPC · JPL
196348	2003 FS_{89}	—	March 29, 2003	Anderson Mesa	LONEOS	·	1.7 km	MPC · JPL
196349	2003 FC_{90}	—	March 29, 2003	Anderson Mesa	LONEOS	·	2.1 km	MPC · JPL
196350	2003 FM_{90}	—	March 29, 2003	Anderson Mesa	LONEOS	·	1.3 km	MPC · JPL
196351	2003 FC_{91}	—	March 29, 2003	Anderson Mesa	LONEOS	·	1.8 km	MPC · JPL
196352	2003 FG_{96}	—	March 30, 2003	Socorro	LINEAR	·	1.8 km	MPC · JPL
196353	2003 FC_{101}	—	March 31, 2003	Anderson Mesa	LONEOS	·	1.5 km	MPC · JPL
196354	2003 FL_{102}	—	March 31, 2003	Kitt Peak	Spacewatch	·	2.1 km	MPC · JPL
196355	2003 FB_{103}	—	March 31, 2003	Kitt Peak	Spacewatch	·	1.7 km	MPC · JPL
196356	2003 FV_{103}	—	March 24, 2003	Kitt Peak	Spacewatch	·	1.5 km	MPC · JPL
196357	2003 FD_{104}	—	March 25, 2003	Haleakala	NEAT	·	1.6 km	MPC · JPL
196358	2003 FT_{104}	—	March 25, 2003	Haleakala	NEAT	·	2.2 km	MPC · JPL
196359	2003 FE_{105}	—	March 26, 2003	Kitt Peak	Spacewatch	·	2.4 km	MPC · JPL
196360	2003 FR_{106}	—	March 27, 2003	Anderson Mesa	LONEOS	NYS	1.6 km	MPC · JPL
196361	2003 FS_{106}	—	March 27, 2003	Anderson Mesa	LONEOS	NYS	3.0 km	MPC · JPL
196362	2003 FT_{108}	—	March 31, 2003	Anderson Mesa	LONEOS	NYS	1.7 km	MPC · JPL
196363	2003 FA_{109}	—	March 31, 2003	Anderson Mesa	LONEOS	·	1.9 km	MPC · JPL
196364	2003 FX_{110}	—	March 30, 2003	Kitt Peak	Spacewatch	L4	20 km	MPC · JPL
196365	2003 FX_{113}	—	March 31, 2003	Socorro	LINEAR	·	1.7 km	MPC · JPL
196366	2003 FY_{113}	—	March 31, 2003	Socorro	LINEAR	·	2.6 km	MPC · JPL
196367	2003 FA_{114}	—	March 31, 2003	Socorro	LINEAR	·	1.5 km	MPC · JPL
196368	2003 FO_{114}	—	March 31, 2003	Socorro	LINEAR	·	2.1 km	MPC · JPL
196369	2003 FY_{115}	—	March 31, 2003	Socorro	LINEAR	·	3.9 km	MPC · JPL
196370	2003 FL_{117}	—	March 25, 2003	Palomar	NEAT	·	1.4 km	MPC · JPL
196371	2003 FA_{118}	—	March 25, 2003	Palomar	NEAT	·	2.9 km	MPC · JPL
196372	2003 FH_{119}	—	March 26, 2003	Anderson Mesa	LONEOS	MAS	1.4 km	MPC · JPL
196373	2003 FO_{127}	—	March 27, 2003	Palomar	NEAT	fast	1.7 km	MPC · JPL
196374	2003 FO_{130}	—	March 25, 2003	Palomar	NEAT	V	1.1 km	MPC · JPL
196375	2003 FR_{131}	—	March 27, 2003	Kitt Peak	Spacewatch	EUN	1.9 km	MPC · JPL
196376	2003 GM_{1}	—	April 1, 2003	Socorro	LINEAR	·	2.4 km	MPC · JPL
196377	2003 GM_{2}	—	April 1, 2003	Socorro	LINEAR	·	1.5 km	MPC · JPL
196378	2003 GU_{2}	—	April 1, 2003	Palomar	NEAT	V	970 m	MPC · JPL
196379	2003 GE_{3}	—	April 1, 2003	Socorro	LINEAR	·	1.3 km	MPC · JPL
196380	2003 GM_{3}	—	April 1, 2003	Socorro	LINEAR	·	1.5 km	MPC · JPL
196381	2003 GZ_{3}	—	April 1, 2003	Socorro	LINEAR	NYS	1.6 km	MPC · JPL
196382	2003 GZ_{4}	—	April 1, 2003	Socorro	LINEAR	NYS	1.7 km	MPC · JPL
196383	2003 GC_{5}	—	April 1, 2003	Socorro	LINEAR	NYS	1.9 km	MPC · JPL
196384	2003 GW_{5}	—	April 1, 2003	Socorro	LINEAR	NYS	1.6 km	MPC · JPL
196385	2003 GM_{6}	—	April 2, 2003	Socorro	LINEAR	·	2.2 km	MPC · JPL
196386	2003 GR_{6}	—	April 2, 2003	Haleakala	NEAT	·	1.5 km	MPC · JPL
196387	2003 GU_{6}	—	April 2, 2003	Haleakala	NEAT	(2076)	1.7 km	MPC · JPL
196388	2003 GS_{8}	—	April 1, 2003	Socorro	LINEAR	NYS	2.1 km	MPC · JPL
196389	2003 GG_{11}	—	April 3, 2003	Anderson Mesa	LONEOS	·	1.6 km	MPC · JPL
196390	2003 GZ_{12}	—	April 1, 2003	Socorro	LINEAR	·	1.5 km	MPC · JPL
196391	2003 GQ_{19}	—	April 4, 2003	Kitt Peak	Spacewatch	·	1.4 km	MPC · JPL
196392	2003 GX_{22}	—	April 3, 2003	Anderson Mesa	LONEOS	·	3.1 km	MPC · JPL
196393	2003 GD_{23}	—	April 4, 2003	Socorro	LINEAR	·	2.1 km	MPC · JPL
196394	2003 GL_{23}	—	April 4, 2003	Anderson Mesa	LONEOS	·	3.8 km	MPC · JPL
196395	2003 GE_{24}	—	April 5, 2003	Kitt Peak	Spacewatch	MAS	1.0 km	MPC · JPL
196396	2003 GH_{24}	—	April 7, 2003	Kitt Peak	Spacewatch	V	1.1 km	MPC · JPL
196397	2003 GS_{25}	—	April 4, 2003	Kitt Peak	Spacewatch	·	1.6 km	MPC · JPL
196398	2003 GW_{27}	—	April 7, 2003	Socorro	LINEAR	NYS	2.0 km	MPC · JPL
196399	2003 GE_{32}	—	April 8, 2003	Socorro	LINEAR	PHO	3.3 km	MPC · JPL
196400	2003 GM_{32}	—	April 8, 2003	Socorro	LINEAR	·	1.7 km	MPC · JPL

== 196401–196500 ==
back to top

Designation			Discovery			Properties		Ref
Permanent	Provisional	Named after	Date	Site	Discoverer(s)	Category	Diam.	Ref
196401	2003 GM_{33}	—	April 3, 2003	Cerro Tololo	Deep Lens Survey	·	2.2 km	MPC · JPL
196402	2003 GN_{34}	—	April 7, 2003	Socorro	LINEAR	·	1.9 km	MPC · JPL
196403	2003 GW_{34}	—	April 7, 2003	Kvistaberg	Uppsala-DLR Asteroid Survey	·	3.4 km	MPC · JPL
196404	2003 GO_{37}	—	April 7, 2003	Socorro	LINEAR	·	1.7 km	MPC · JPL
196405	2003 GX_{37}	—	April 8, 2003	Socorro	LINEAR	·	1.4 km	MPC · JPL
196406	2003 GF_{42}	—	April 4, 2003	Goodricke-Pigott	Kessel, J. W.	NYS	1.5 km	MPC · JPL
196407	2003 GM_{46}	—	April 8, 2003	Palomar	NEAT	·	2.9 km	MPC · JPL
196408	2003 GW_{47}	—	April 8, 2003	Socorro	LINEAR	L4	15 km	MPC · JPL
196409	2003 GN_{48}	—	April 9, 2003	Palomar	NEAT	·	1.4 km	MPC · JPL
196410	2003 GN_{49}	—	April 10, 2003	Kitt Peak	Spacewatch	·	1.5 km	MPC · JPL
196411 Umurhan	2003 GW_{51}	Umurhan	April 1, 2003	Kitt Peak	M. W. Buie	·	850 m	MPC · JPL
196412	2003 GK_{54}	—	April 1, 2003	Goodricke-Pigott	R. A. Tucker	·	1.7 km	MPC · JPL
196413	2003 GS_{54}	—	April 3, 2003	Anderson Mesa	LONEOS	·	2.3 km	MPC · JPL
196414	2003 GS_{55}	—	April 5, 2003	Kitt Peak	Spacewatch	·	2.3 km	MPC · JPL
196415	2003 HE	—	April 21, 2003	Siding Spring	R. H. McNaught	NYS	1.5 km	MPC · JPL
196416	2003 HP_{1}	—	April 23, 2003	Campo Imperatore	CINEOS	·	1.8 km	MPC · JPL
196417	2003 HP_{2}	—	April 21, 2003	Catalina	CSS	V	1.2 km	MPC · JPL
196418	2003 HX_{5}	—	April 24, 2003	Haleakala	NEAT	V	990 m	MPC · JPL
196419	2003 HF_{9}	—	April 24, 2003	Anderson Mesa	LONEOS	·	1.8 km	MPC · JPL
196420	2003 HO_{9}	—	April 24, 2003	Anderson Mesa	LONEOS	·	3.6 km	MPC · JPL
196421	2003 HS_{9}	—	April 25, 2003	Kitt Peak	Spacewatch	MAS	890 m	MPC · JPL
196422	2003 HF_{11}	—	April 26, 2003	Kitt Peak	Spacewatch	·	770 m	MPC · JPL
196423	2003 HL_{12}	—	April 26, 2003	Kitt Peak	Spacewatch	·	2.2 km	MPC · JPL
196424	2003 HJ_{14}	—	April 26, 2003	Socorro	LINEAR	·	2.3 km	MPC · JPL
196425	2003 HA_{20}	—	April 26, 2003	Haleakala	NEAT	·	2.3 km	MPC · JPL
196426	2003 HB_{20}	—	April 26, 2003	Haleakala	NEAT	·	1.5 km	MPC · JPL
196427	2003 HG_{20}	—	April 26, 2003	Haleakala	NEAT	·	1.6 km	MPC · JPL
196428	2003 HJ_{20}	—	April 24, 2003	Anderson Mesa	LONEOS	NYS	1.7 km	MPC · JPL
196429	2003 HS_{20}	—	April 24, 2003	Anderson Mesa	LONEOS	MAS	1.2 km	MPC · JPL
196430	2003 HE_{21}	—	April 25, 2003	Anderson Mesa	LONEOS	EUN	1.7 km	MPC · JPL
196431	2003 HB_{22}	—	April 27, 2003	Anderson Mesa	LONEOS	·	3.3 km	MPC · JPL
196432	2003 HA_{28}	—	April 26, 2003	Kitt Peak	Spacewatch	NYS	1.6 km	MPC · JPL
196433	2003 HO_{28}	—	April 26, 2003	Haleakala	NEAT	·	1.8 km	MPC · JPL
196434	2003 HW_{29}	—	April 28, 2003	Anderson Mesa	LONEOS	·	2.2 km	MPC · JPL
196435	2003 HD_{30}	—	April 28, 2003	Anderson Mesa	LONEOS	·	1.5 km	MPC · JPL
196436	2003 HL_{30}	—	April 28, 2003	Socorro	LINEAR	NYS	1.9 km	MPC · JPL
196437	2003 HU_{31}	—	April 28, 2003	Socorro	LINEAR	·	2.7 km	MPC · JPL
196438	2003 HM_{33}	—	April 26, 2003	Kitt Peak	Spacewatch	MAS	860 m	MPC · JPL
196439	2003 HU_{33}	—	April 28, 2003	Anderson Mesa	LONEOS	·	1.7 km	MPC · JPL
196440	2003 HQ_{35}	—	April 27, 2003	Anderson Mesa	LONEOS	L4	13 km	MPC · JPL
196441	2003 HL_{36}	—	April 29, 2003	Kitt Peak	Spacewatch	V	990 m	MPC · JPL
196442	2003 HF_{37}	—	April 26, 2003	Haleakala	NEAT	·	1.3 km	MPC · JPL
196443	2003 HK_{37}	—	April 26, 2003	Haleakala	NEAT	·	1.6 km	MPC · JPL
196444	2003 HQ_{37}	—	April 28, 2003	Anderson Mesa	LONEOS	·	1.8 km	MPC · JPL
196445	2003 HW_{37}	—	April 28, 2003	Anderson Mesa	LONEOS	·	1.9 km	MPC · JPL
196446	2003 HP_{39}	—	April 29, 2003	Socorro	LINEAR	·	1.6 km	MPC · JPL
196447	2003 HO_{43}	—	April 29, 2003	Kitt Peak	Spacewatch	·	1.9 km	MPC · JPL
196448	2003 HH_{44}	—	April 27, 2003	Anderson Mesa	LONEOS	·	2.3 km	MPC · JPL
196449	2003 HB_{47}	—	April 28, 2003	Socorro	LINEAR	NYS	1.7 km	MPC · JPL
196450	2003 HH_{47}	—	April 28, 2003	Socorro	LINEAR	PHO	2.2 km	MPC · JPL
196451	2003 HO_{47}	—	April 29, 2003	Anderson Mesa	LONEOS	MAS	1.4 km	MPC · JPL
196452	2003 HO_{48}	—	April 30, 2003	Socorro	LINEAR	·	2.3 km	MPC · JPL
196453	2003 HC_{49}	—	April 30, 2003	Socorro	LINEAR	·	3.3 km	MPC · JPL
196454	2003 HF_{50}	—	April 28, 2003	Socorro	LINEAR	·	1.8 km	MPC · JPL
196455	2003 HG_{50}	—	April 30, 2003	Kitt Peak	Spacewatch	MAR	1.5 km	MPC · JPL
196456	2003 HJ_{51}	—	April 29, 2003	Kitt Peak	Spacewatch	·	2.1 km	MPC · JPL
196457	2003 HG_{52}	—	April 30, 2003	Kitt Peak	Spacewatch	·	1.8 km	MPC · JPL
196458	2003 HS_{52}	—	April 29, 2003	Anderson Mesa	LONEOS	·	1.9 km	MPC · JPL
196459	2003 HV_{52}	—	April 29, 2003	Anderson Mesa	LONEOS	MAS	1.0 km	MPC · JPL
196460	2003 HF_{53}	—	April 30, 2003	Reedy Creek	J. Broughton	·	2.7 km	MPC · JPL
196461	2003 HV_{53}	—	April 21, 2003	Kitt Peak	Spacewatch	·	2.3 km	MPC · JPL
196462	2003 HQ_{54}	—	April 24, 2003	Anderson Mesa	LONEOS	·	1.5 km	MPC · JPL
196463	2003 HV_{57}	—	April 25, 2003	Kitt Peak	Spacewatch	·	1.9 km	MPC · JPL
196464	2003 HH_{58}	—	April 26, 2003	Kitt Peak	Spacewatch	NYS	1.6 km	MPC · JPL
196465	2003 JG_{5}	—	May 1, 2003	Socorro	LINEAR	·	2.1 km	MPC · JPL
196466	2003 JB_{7}	—	May 1, 2003	Socorro	LINEAR	NYS	1.7 km	MPC · JPL
196467	2003 JX_{8}	—	May 2, 2003	Kitt Peak	Spacewatch	·	2.1 km	MPC · JPL
196468	2003 JH_{9}	—	May 2, 2003	Kitt Peak	Spacewatch	NYS	1.9 km	MPC · JPL
196469	2003 JN_{9}	—	May 2, 2003	Socorro	LINEAR	·	1.6 km	MPC · JPL
196470	2003 JJ_{10}	—	May 2, 2003	Socorro	LINEAR	·	2.9 km	MPC · JPL
196471	2003 JH_{11}	—	May 3, 2003	Kitt Peak	Spacewatch	V	1.1 km	MPC · JPL
196472	2003 JY_{11}	—	May 5, 2003	Kitt Peak	Spacewatch	MAS	990 m	MPC · JPL
196473	2003 JD_{12}	—	May 5, 2003	Socorro	LINEAR	·	1.8 km	MPC · JPL
196474	2003 JX_{13}	—	May 5, 2003	Socorro	LINEAR	·	1.9 km	MPC · JPL
196475	2003 JV_{15}	—	May 6, 2003	Kitt Peak	Spacewatch	NYS	1.6 km	MPC · JPL
196476 Humfernández	2003 JU_{17}	Humfernández	May 2, 2003	Mérida	Ferrin, I. R., Leal, C.	·	3.6 km	MPC · JPL
196477	2003 JB_{18}	—	May 2, 2003	Kitt Peak	Spacewatch	·	2.1 km	MPC · JPL
196478	2003 KC	—	May 20, 2003	Nogales	M. Schwartz, P. R. Holvorcem	·	1.7 km	MPC · JPL
196479	2003 KU	—	May 21, 2003	Reedy Creek	J. Broughton	PHO	1.3 km	MPC · JPL
196480	2003 KF_{1}	—	May 22, 2003	Kitt Peak	Spacewatch	·	2.6 km	MPC · JPL
196481 VATT	2003 KS_{2}	VATT	May 23, 2003	Mount Graham	Ryan, W. H., Martinez, C. T.	·	1.2 km	MPC · JPL
196482	2003 KW_{3}	—	May 23, 2003	Reedy Creek	J. Broughton	·	2.3 km	MPC · JPL
196483	2003 KV_{6}	—	May 25, 2003	Kitt Peak	Spacewatch	·	1.8 km	MPC · JPL
196484	2003 KK_{9}	—	May 24, 2003	Reedy Creek	J. Broughton	RAF	1.3 km	MPC · JPL
196485	2003 KG_{10}	—	May 25, 2003	Kitt Peak	Spacewatch	·	1.5 km	MPC · JPL
196486	2003 KZ_{11}	—	May 27, 2003	Anderson Mesa	LONEOS	NYS	2.1 km	MPC · JPL
196487	2003 KA_{12}	—	May 27, 2003	Anderson Mesa	LONEOS	·	1.5 km	MPC · JPL
196488	2003 KM_{12}	—	May 26, 2003	Kitt Peak	Spacewatch	L4	13 km	MPC · JPL
196489	2003 KC_{14}	—	May 28, 2003	Socorro	LINEAR	BAR	2.2 km	MPC · JPL
196490	2003 KB_{17}	—	May 26, 2003	Kitt Peak	Spacewatch	·	1.9 km	MPC · JPL
196491	2003 KJ_{17}	—	May 26, 2003	Haleakala	NEAT	(194)	4.6 km	MPC · JPL
196492	2003 KX_{19}	—	May 30, 2003	Socorro	LINEAR	V	1.1 km	MPC · JPL
196493	2003 KB_{20}	—	May 30, 2003	Socorro	LINEAR	·	1.9 km	MPC · JPL
196494	2003 KF_{33}	—	May 27, 2003	Kitt Peak	Spacewatch	·	850 m	MPC · JPL
196495	2003 LJ_{1}	—	June 1, 2003	Kitt Peak	Spacewatch	·	3.2 km	MPC · JPL
196496	2003 LB_{3}	—	June 1, 2003	Kitt Peak	Spacewatch	·	1.4 km	MPC · JPL
196497	2003 LZ_{3}	—	June 5, 2003	Reedy Creek	J. Broughton	ADE	3.0 km	MPC · JPL
196498	2003 LY_{5}	—	June 2, 2003	Kitt Peak	Spacewatch	EUN	1.9 km	MPC · JPL
196499	2003 LV_{6}	—	June 4, 2003	Goodricke-Pigott	Kessel, J. W.	·	2.7 km	MPC · JPL
196500	2003 LW_{6}	—	June 7, 2003	Reedy Creek	J. Broughton	·	2.5 km	MPC · JPL

== 196501–196600 ==
back to top

Designation			Discovery			Properties		Ref
Permanent	Provisional	Named after	Date	Site	Discoverer(s)	Category	Diam.	Ref
196501	2003 LX_{6}	—	June 7, 2003	Reedy Creek	J. Broughton	RAF	1.7 km	MPC · JPL
196502	2003 MA_{1}	—	June 22, 2003	Anderson Mesa	LONEOS	·	4.0 km	MPC · JPL
196503	2003 MX_{6}	—	June 27, 2003	Haleakala	NEAT	·	5.2 km	MPC · JPL
196504	2003 MT_{8}	—	June 28, 2003	Socorro	LINEAR	·	2.2 km	MPC · JPL
196505	2003 MD_{9}	—	June 29, 2003	Socorro	LINEAR	·	3.2 km	MPC · JPL
196506	2003 MW_{11}	—	June 27, 2003	Nogales	Tenagra II	·	3.2 km	MPC · JPL
196507	2003 MN_{12}	—	June 29, 2003	Socorro	LINEAR	·	3.8 km	MPC · JPL
196508	2003 MY_{12}	—	June 22, 2003	Anderson Mesa	LONEOS	·	3.1 km	MPC · JPL
196509	2003 MA_{13}	—	June 25, 2003	Socorro	LINEAR	·	1.9 km	MPC · JPL
196510	2003 NR_{1}	—	July 2, 2003	Socorro	LINEAR	·	2.9 km	MPC · JPL
196511	2003 NS_{2}	—	July 1, 2003	Socorro	LINEAR	EUN	1.9 km	MPC · JPL
196512	2003 NZ_{2}	—	July 2, 2003	Socorro	LINEAR	·	3.6 km	MPC · JPL
196513	2003 NA_{5}	—	July 4, 2003	Reedy Creek	J. Broughton	·	3.1 km	MPC · JPL
196514	2003 NQ_{5}	—	July 4, 2003	Haleakala	NEAT	·	2.6 km	MPC · JPL
196515	2003 NP_{11}	—	July 3, 2003	Kitt Peak	Spacewatch	·	3.0 km	MPC · JPL
196516	2003 OJ	—	July 18, 2003	Siding Spring	R. H. McNaught	·	3.6 km	MPC · JPL
196517	2003 OP	—	July 20, 2003	Reedy Creek	J. Broughton	·	2.1 km	MPC · JPL
196518	2003 OS_{3}	—	July 22, 2003	Campo Imperatore	CINEOS	AGN	1.9 km	MPC · JPL
196519	2003 OL_{4}	—	July 22, 2003	Haleakala	NEAT	·	3.1 km	MPC · JPL
196520	2003 OP_{6}	—	July 23, 2003	Socorro	LINEAR	·	4.0 km	MPC · JPL
196521	2003 OE_{9}	—	July 23, 2003	Palomar	NEAT	EUN	1.7 km	MPC · JPL
196522	2003 OJ_{10}	—	July 25, 2003	Socorro	LINEAR	·	3.3 km	MPC · JPL
196523	2003 OJ_{15}	—	July 23, 2003	Palomar	NEAT	·	2.4 km	MPC · JPL
196524	2003 OS_{15}	—	July 23, 2003	Palomar	NEAT	·	2.3 km	MPC · JPL
196525	2003 OT_{15}	—	July 23, 2003	Palomar	NEAT	·	2.4 km	MPC · JPL
196526	2003 OY_{15}	—	July 23, 2003	Palomar	NEAT	GEF	2.2 km	MPC · JPL
196527	2003 OZ_{17}	—	July 30, 2003	Reedy Creek	J. Broughton	·	3.4 km	MPC · JPL
196528	2003 OE_{18}	—	July 24, 2003	Campo Imperatore	CINEOS	·	3.1 km	MPC · JPL
196529	2003 OA_{20}	—	July 30, 2003	Needville	Dillon, W. G., Garossino, P.	·	2.7 km	MPC · JPL
196530	2003 OB_{20}	—	July 30, 2003	Campo Imperatore	CINEOS	·	4.9 km	MPC · JPL
196531	2003 OC_{20}	—	July 30, 2003	Campo Imperatore	CINEOS	·	2.5 km	MPC · JPL
196532	2003 OY_{20}	—	July 31, 2003	Reedy Creek	J. Broughton	·	2.2 km	MPC · JPL
196533	2003 OK_{21}	—	July 26, 2003	Socorro	LINEAR	·	4.6 km	MPC · JPL
196534	2003 OR_{21}	—	July 28, 2003	Campo Imperatore	CINEOS	EUN	2.3 km	MPC · JPL
196535	2003 OR_{27}	—	July 24, 2003	Palomar	NEAT	·	3.2 km	MPC · JPL
196536	2003 OF_{28}	—	July 24, 2003	Palomar	NEAT	·	3.8 km	MPC · JPL
196537	2003 OK_{29}	—	July 24, 2003	Palomar	NEAT	·	2.7 km	MPC · JPL
196538	2003 OR_{29}	—	July 24, 2003	Palomar	NEAT	·	3.6 km	MPC · JPL
196539	2003 OA_{30}	—	July 24, 2003	Palomar	NEAT	·	2.3 km	MPC · JPL
196540 Weinbaum	2003 OW_{30}	Weinbaum	July 31, 2003	Saint-Sulpice	B. Christophe	·	2.2 km	MPC · JPL
196541	2003 OW_{32}	—	July 24, 2003	Palomar	NEAT	AGN	1.7 km	MPC · JPL
196542	2003 PZ	—	August 1, 2003	Socorro	LINEAR	·	3.5 km	MPC · JPL
196543	2003 PS_{1}	—	August 1, 2003	Haleakala	NEAT	DOR	3.5 km	MPC · JPL
196544	2003 PB_{2}	—	August 1, 2003	Haleakala	NEAT	·	3.9 km	MPC · JPL
196545	2003 PQ_{7}	—	August 2, 2003	Haleakala	NEAT	·	3.1 km	MPC · JPL
196546	2003 PT_{11}	—	August 1, 2003	Socorro	LINEAR	·	2.6 km	MPC · JPL
196547	2003 QE_{2}	—	August 20, 2003	Campo Imperatore	CINEOS	·	2.4 km	MPC · JPL
196548	2003 QN_{2}	—	August 19, 2003	Campo Imperatore	CINEOS	·	2.7 km	MPC · JPL
196549	2003 QR_{3}	—	August 17, 2003	Haleakala	NEAT	GEF	1.8 km	MPC · JPL
196550	2003 QP_{5}	—	August 20, 2003	Haleakala	NEAT	·	4.1 km	MPC · JPL
196551	2003 QW_{6}	—	August 20, 2003	Campo Imperatore	CINEOS	·	2.5 km	MPC · JPL
196552	2003 QD_{7}	—	August 20, 2003	Campo Imperatore	CINEOS	·	3.3 km	MPC · JPL
196553	2003 QO_{7}	—	August 21, 2003	Palomar	NEAT	·	5.6 km	MPC · JPL
196554	2003 QZ_{7}	—	August 18, 2003	Campo Imperatore	CINEOS	AGN	1.6 km	MPC · JPL
196555	2003 QU_{9}	—	August 20, 2003	Reedy Creek	J. Broughton	·	2.9 km	MPC · JPL
196556	2003 QH_{12}	—	August 22, 2003	Socorro	LINEAR	WIT	1.7 km	MPC · JPL
196557	2003 QU_{12}	—	August 22, 2003	Haleakala	NEAT	HOF	5.7 km	MPC · JPL
196558	2003 QB_{13}	—	August 22, 2003	Haleakala	NEAT	·	3.8 km	MPC · JPL
196559	2003 QG_{13}	—	August 22, 2003	Haleakala	NEAT	AGN	2.2 km	MPC · JPL
196560	2003 QQ_{14}	—	August 20, 2003	Palomar	NEAT	·	3.0 km	MPC · JPL
196561	2003 QY_{15}	—	August 20, 2003	Palomar	NEAT	·	3.2 km	MPC · JPL
196562	2003 QU_{18}	—	August 22, 2003	Palomar	NEAT	·	3.2 km	MPC · JPL
196563	2003 QU_{19}	—	August 22, 2003	Palomar	NEAT	·	3.2 km	MPC · JPL
196564	2003 QJ_{20}	—	August 22, 2003	Palomar	NEAT	·	2.4 km	MPC · JPL
196565	2003 QX_{20}	—	August 22, 2003	Palomar	NEAT	·	6.3 km	MPC · JPL
196566	2003 QE_{24}	—	August 21, 2003	Palomar	NEAT	(5)	1.8 km	MPC · JPL
196567	2003 QP_{25}	—	August 22, 2003	Palomar	NEAT	·	5.9 km	MPC · JPL
196568	2003 QL_{27}	—	August 23, 2003	Palomar	NEAT	·	2.4 km	MPC · JPL
196569	2003 QY_{28}	—	August 23, 2003	Socorro	LINEAR	EOS	3.5 km	MPC · JPL
196570	2003 QW_{31}	—	August 21, 2003	Palomar	NEAT	·	3.2 km	MPC · JPL
196571	2003 QB_{32}	—	August 21, 2003	Palomar	NEAT	·	2.9 km	MPC · JPL
196572	2003 QS_{32}	—	August 21, 2003	Palomar	NEAT	·	4.2 km	MPC · JPL
196573	2003 QR_{34}	—	August 22, 2003	Palomar	NEAT	HOF	4.9 km	MPC · JPL
196574	2003 QK_{36}	—	August 22, 2003	Socorro	LINEAR	·	3.4 km	MPC · JPL
196575	2003 QV_{36}	—	August 22, 2003	Socorro	LINEAR	DOR	3.4 km	MPC · JPL
196576	2003 QE_{40}	—	August 22, 2003	Socorro	LINEAR	·	3.5 km	MPC · JPL
196577	2003 QT_{40}	—	August 22, 2003	Socorro	LINEAR	·	3.2 km	MPC · JPL
196578	2003 QV_{40}	—	August 22, 2003	Socorro	LINEAR	·	3.0 km	MPC · JPL
196579	2003 QD_{41}	—	August 22, 2003	Socorro	LINEAR	·	3.8 km	MPC · JPL
196580	2003 QJ_{41}	—	August 22, 2003	Socorro	LINEAR	·	7.0 km	MPC · JPL
196581	2003 QS_{45}	—	August 23, 2003	Palomar	NEAT	·	3.3 km	MPC · JPL
196582	2003 QS_{46}	—	August 24, 2003	Palomar	NEAT	·	3.4 km	MPC · JPL
196583	2003 QM_{48}	—	August 20, 2003	Campo Imperatore	CINEOS	KOR	2.0 km	MPC · JPL
196584	2003 QX_{48}	—	August 21, 2003	Campo Imperatore	CINEOS	·	4.2 km	MPC · JPL
196585	2003 QJ_{49}	—	August 22, 2003	Palomar	NEAT	·	3.2 km	MPC · JPL
196586	2003 QC_{50}	—	August 22, 2003	Palomar	NEAT	GEF	5.3 km	MPC · JPL
196587	2003 QJ_{50}	—	August 22, 2003	Haleakala	NEAT	DOR	5.5 km	MPC · JPL
196588	2003 QA_{51}	—	August 22, 2003	Palomar	NEAT	(16286)	3.4 km	MPC · JPL
196589	2003 QG_{51}	—	August 22, 2003	Palomar	NEAT	·	3.3 km	MPC · JPL
196590	2003 QL_{53}	—	August 23, 2003	Socorro	LINEAR	KOR	2.7 km	MPC · JPL
196591	2003 QL_{56}	—	August 23, 2003	Socorro	LINEAR	GEF	2.1 km	MPC · JPL
196592	2003 QE_{60}	—	August 23, 2003	Socorro	LINEAR	·	3.4 km	MPC · JPL
196593	2003 QC_{61}	—	August 23, 2003	Socorro	LINEAR	MRX	2.2 km	MPC · JPL
196594	2003 QG_{64}	—	August 23, 2003	Socorro	LINEAR	·	2.4 km	MPC · JPL
196595	2003 QX_{64}	—	August 23, 2003	Palomar	NEAT	AGN	2.0 km	MPC · JPL
196596	2003 QH_{65}	—	August 23, 2003	Palomar	NEAT	EUN	1.9 km	MPC · JPL
196597	2003 QJ_{66}	—	August 22, 2003	Socorro	LINEAR	·	2.9 km	MPC · JPL
196598	2003 QK_{66}	—	August 22, 2003	Palomar	NEAT	·	4.3 km	MPC · JPL
196599	2003 QX_{66}	—	August 23, 2003	Palomar	NEAT	·	2.8 km	MPC · JPL
196600	2003 QH_{68}	—	August 25, 2003	Socorro	LINEAR	AEO	1.4 km	MPC · JPL

== 196601–196700 ==
back to top

Designation			Discovery			Properties		Ref
Permanent	Provisional	Named after	Date	Site	Discoverer(s)	Category	Diam.	Ref
196601	2003 QY_{68}	—	August 25, 2003	Reedy Creek	J. Broughton	H	1.1 km	MPC · JPL
196602	2003 QQ_{70}	—	August 23, 2003	Socorro	LINEAR	·	1.7 km	MPC · JPL
196603	2003 QT_{70}	—	August 23, 2003	Palomar	NEAT	·	1.7 km	MPC · JPL
196604	2003 QH_{74}	—	August 24, 2003	Socorro	LINEAR	·	3.3 km	MPC · JPL
196605	2003 QM_{75}	—	August 24, 2003	Socorro	LINEAR	·	4.8 km	MPC · JPL
196606	2003 QX_{75}	—	August 24, 2003	Socorro	LINEAR	EUN	2.2 km	MPC · JPL
196607	2003 QC_{76}	—	August 24, 2003	Socorro	LINEAR	·	2.7 km	MPC · JPL
196608	2003 QE_{77}	—	August 24, 2003	Socorro	LINEAR	·	3.7 km	MPC · JPL
196609	2003 QQ_{78}	—	August 24, 2003	Socorro	LINEAR	H	1.1 km	MPC · JPL
196610	2003 QK_{79}	—	August 25, 2003	Socorro	LINEAR	·	3.1 km	MPC · JPL
196611	2003 QA_{85}	—	August 24, 2003	Socorro	LINEAR	·	2.6 km	MPC · JPL
196612	2003 QQ_{89}	—	August 27, 2003	Haleakala	NEAT	·	4.1 km	MPC · JPL
196613	2003 QN_{90}	—	August 28, 2003	Socorro	LINEAR	·	3.0 km	MPC · JPL
196614	2003 QB_{96}	—	August 30, 2003	Kitt Peak	Spacewatch	·	2.3 km	MPC · JPL
196615	2003 QY_{107}	—	August 31, 2003	Socorro	LINEAR	·	2.0 km	MPC · JPL
196616	2003 QE_{108}	—	August 31, 2003	Socorro	LINEAR	H	800 m	MPC · JPL
196617	2003 QQ_{111}	—	August 31, 2003	Kitt Peak	Spacewatch	·	6.0 km	MPC · JPL
196618	2003 QG_{114}	—	August 26, 2003	Socorro	LINEAR	HOF	4.2 km	MPC · JPL
196619	2003 RH_{3}	—	September 1, 2003	Socorro	LINEAR	HOF	4.1 km	MPC · JPL
196620	2003 RN_{4}	—	September 3, 2003	Socorro	LINEAR	·	3.0 km	MPC · JPL
196621	2003 RH_{5}	—	September 1, 2003	Socorro	LINEAR	DOR	4.1 km	MPC · JPL
196622	2003 RN_{5}	—	September 1, 2003	Socorro	LINEAR	DOR	5.3 km	MPC · JPL
196623	2003 RX_{5}	—	September 2, 2003	Socorro	LINEAR	BRA	3.1 km	MPC · JPL
196624	2003 RK_{9}	—	September 4, 2003	Kitt Peak	Spacewatch	·	2.4 km	MPC · JPL
196625	2003 RM_{10}	—	September 13, 2003	Anderson Mesa	LONEOS	APO · PHA	310 m	MPC · JPL
196626	2003 RH_{11}	—	September 13, 2003	Haleakala	NEAT	·	5.7 km	MPC · JPL
196627	2003 RR_{14}	—	September 13, 2003	Haleakala	NEAT	·	2.8 km	MPC · JPL
196628	2003 RV_{16}	—	September 15, 2003	Palomar	NEAT	GEF	1.7 km	MPC · JPL
196629	2003 RH_{20}	—	September 15, 2003	Anderson Mesa	LONEOS	·	4.2 km	MPC · JPL
196630	2003 RH_{21}	—	September 15, 2003	Anderson Mesa	LONEOS	·	2.2 km	MPC · JPL
196631	2003 RE_{22}	—	September 14, 2003	Haleakala	NEAT	·	3.7 km	MPC · JPL
196632	2003 SH_{1}	—	September 16, 2003	Kitt Peak	Spacewatch	·	2.3 km	MPC · JPL
196633	2003 SO_{2}	—	September 16, 2003	Kitt Peak	Spacewatch	NEM	2.8 km	MPC · JPL
196634	2003 SC_{3}	—	September 16, 2003	Palomar	NEAT	·	6.0 km	MPC · JPL
196635	2003 SO_{3}	—	September 16, 2003	Palomar	NEAT	·	3.2 km	MPC · JPL
196636	2003 SA_{4}	—	September 16, 2003	Kitt Peak	Spacewatch	KOR	1.8 km	MPC · JPL
196637	2003 SF_{8}	—	September 16, 2003	Kitt Peak	Spacewatch	KOR	2.1 km	MPC · JPL
196638	2003 SO_{10}	—	September 17, 2003	Kitt Peak	Spacewatch	EOS ·	5.2 km	MPC · JPL
196639	2003 SD_{13}	—	September 16, 2003	Kitt Peak	Spacewatch	KOR	2.4 km	MPC · JPL
196640 Mulhacén	2003 SO_{15}	Mulhacén	September 17, 2003	Heppenheim	F. Hormuth	·	2.9 km	MPC · JPL
196641	2003 SP_{17}	—	September 17, 2003	Kvistaberg	Uppsala-DLR Asteroid Survey	·	2.8 km	MPC · JPL
196642	2003 SR_{17}	—	September 17, 2003	Kitt Peak	Spacewatch	EOS	3.0 km	MPC · JPL
196643	2003 SH_{18}	—	September 16, 2003	Kitt Peak	Spacewatch	·	2.9 km	MPC · JPL
196644	2003 ST_{23}	—	September 17, 2003	Kitt Peak	Spacewatch	·	4.1 km	MPC · JPL
196645	2003 SW_{23}	—	September 17, 2003	Kitt Peak	Spacewatch	·	3.5 km	MPC · JPL
196646	2003 SY_{23}	—	September 17, 2003	Kitt Peak	Spacewatch	MRX	1.9 km	MPC · JPL
196647	2003 SL_{25}	—	September 17, 2003	Kitt Peak	Spacewatch	·	3.5 km	MPC · JPL
196648	2003 SP_{25}	—	September 17, 2003	Kitt Peak	Spacewatch	·	2.6 km	MPC · JPL
196649	2003 SG_{26}	—	September 17, 2003	Haleakala	NEAT	·	4.2 km	MPC · JPL
196650	2003 SM_{26}	—	September 17, 2003	Haleakala	NEAT	TEL	2.1 km	MPC · JPL
196651	2003 SN_{28}	—	September 18, 2003	Palomar	NEAT	·	4.3 km	MPC · JPL
196652	2003 SG_{30}	—	September 18, 2003	Palomar	NEAT	·	4.3 km	MPC · JPL
196653	2003 SV_{30}	—	September 18, 2003	Kitt Peak	Spacewatch	·	4.5 km	MPC · JPL
196654	2003 SS_{34}	—	September 18, 2003	Palomar	NEAT	·	2.9 km	MPC · JPL
196655	2003 SY_{34}	—	September 18, 2003	Kitt Peak	Spacewatch	KOR	2.0 km	MPC · JPL
196656	2003 SA_{35}	—	September 18, 2003	Kitt Peak	Spacewatch	·	4.0 km	MPC · JPL
196657	2003 SR_{36}	—	September 18, 2003	Socorro	LINEAR	EOS	3.8 km	MPC · JPL
196658	2003 SJ_{37}	—	September 16, 2003	Palomar	NEAT	·	4.4 km	MPC · JPL
196659	2003 SR_{38}	—	September 16, 2003	Palomar	NEAT	·	3.5 km	MPC · JPL
196660	2003 SQ_{40}	—	September 16, 2003	Palomar	NEAT	·	3.6 km	MPC · JPL
196661	2003 SL_{41}	—	September 17, 2003	Palomar	NEAT	·	5.9 km	MPC · JPL
196662	2003 SO_{43}	—	September 16, 2003	Anderson Mesa	LONEOS	·	6.0 km	MPC · JPL
196663	2003 SL_{44}	—	September 16, 2003	Anderson Mesa	LONEOS	slow	4.0 km	MPC · JPL
196664	2003 SD_{46}	—	September 16, 2003	Anderson Mesa	LONEOS	KOR	2.4 km	MPC · JPL
196665	2003 SJ_{46}	—	September 16, 2003	Anderson Mesa	LONEOS	·	3.8 km	MPC · JPL
196666	2003 SF_{47}	—	September 16, 2003	Anderson Mesa	LONEOS	·	2.6 km	MPC · JPL
196667	2003 SN_{50}	—	September 18, 2003	Palomar	NEAT	·	2.8 km	MPC · JPL
196668	2003 SW_{50}	—	September 18, 2003	Palomar	NEAT	·	3.2 km	MPC · JPL
196669	2003 SK_{51}	—	September 18, 2003	Palomar	NEAT	·	5.4 km	MPC · JPL
196670	2003 ST_{52}	—	September 19, 2003	Palomar	NEAT	·	5.2 km	MPC · JPL
196671	2003 SU_{53}	—	September 16, 2003	Kitt Peak	Spacewatch	GEF	1.6 km	MPC · JPL
196672	2003 SY_{54}	—	September 16, 2003	Anderson Mesa	LONEOS	·	4.4 km	MPC · JPL
196673	2003 SZ_{54}	—	September 16, 2003	Anderson Mesa	LONEOS	·	4.8 km	MPC · JPL
196674	2003 SR_{56}	—	September 16, 2003	Kitt Peak	Spacewatch	·	3.0 km	MPC · JPL
196675	2003 SV_{56}	—	September 16, 2003	Kitt Peak	Spacewatch	·	3.2 km	MPC · JPL
196676	2003 SQ_{59}	—	September 17, 2003	Anderson Mesa	LONEOS	·	3.2 km	MPC · JPL
196677	2003 ST_{60}	—	September 17, 2003	Kitt Peak	Spacewatch	·	2.7 km	MPC · JPL
196678	2003 SD_{61}	—	September 17, 2003	Socorro	LINEAR	(21344)	3.2 km	MPC · JPL
196679	2003 SP_{61}	—	September 17, 2003	Socorro	LINEAR	(21885)	4.5 km	MPC · JPL
196680	2003 SB_{63}	—	September 17, 2003	Kitt Peak	Spacewatch	·	3.1 km	MPC · JPL
196681	2003 SZ_{63}	—	September 17, 2003	Črni Vrh	Skvarč, J.	·	2.5 km	MPC · JPL
196682	2003 SK_{64}	—	September 18, 2003	Campo Imperatore	CINEOS	NAE	5.6 km	MPC · JPL
196683	2003 SY_{64}	—	September 18, 2003	Campo Imperatore	CINEOS	·	3.0 km	MPC · JPL
196684	2003 SZ_{64}	—	September 18, 2003	Campo Imperatore	CINEOS	·	3.1 km	MPC · JPL
196685	2003 SB_{65}	—	September 18, 2003	Campo Imperatore	CINEOS	KOR	2.1 km	MPC · JPL
196686	2003 SC_{65}	—	September 18, 2003	Campo Imperatore	CINEOS	·	3.7 km	MPC · JPL
196687	2003 SH_{65}	—	September 18, 2003	Anderson Mesa	LONEOS	·	6.1 km	MPC · JPL
196688	2003 SQ_{66}	—	September 18, 2003	Campo Imperatore	CINEOS	·	3.8 km	MPC · JPL
196689	2003 SY_{67}	—	September 16, 2003	Haleakala	NEAT	·	3.2 km	MPC · JPL
196690	2003 SD_{70}	—	September 17, 2003	Kitt Peak	Spacewatch	·	3.4 km	MPC · JPL
196691	2003 SO_{70}	—	September 17, 2003	Haleakala	NEAT	GEF	2.0 km	MPC · JPL
196692	2003 SE_{71}	—	September 18, 2003	Kitt Peak	Spacewatch	·	2.8 km	MPC · JPL
196693	2003 SX_{73}	—	September 18, 2003	Kitt Peak	Spacewatch	·	4.2 km	MPC · JPL
196694	2003 SD_{74}	—	September 18, 2003	Kitt Peak	Spacewatch	(5)	1.7 km	MPC · JPL
196695	2003 SL_{74}	—	September 18, 2003	Kitt Peak	Spacewatch	·	3.5 km	MPC · JPL
196696	2003 SK_{75}	—	September 18, 2003	Kitt Peak	Spacewatch	·	3.3 km	MPC · JPL
196697	2003 SY_{76}	—	September 19, 2003	Kitt Peak	Spacewatch	·	2.1 km	MPC · JPL
196698	2003 SV_{77}	—	September 19, 2003	Kitt Peak	Spacewatch	·	3.4 km	MPC · JPL
196699	2003 SX_{78}	—	September 19, 2003	Kitt Peak	Spacewatch	·	5.4 km	MPC · JPL
196700	2003 SX_{80}	—	September 19, 2003	Kitt Peak	Spacewatch	·	5.1 km	MPC · JPL

== 196701–196800 ==
back to top

Designation			Discovery			Properties		Ref
Permanent	Provisional	Named after	Date	Site	Discoverer(s)	Category	Diam.	Ref
196701	2003 SC_{82}	—	September 17, 2003	Kitt Peak	Spacewatch	·	2.5 km	MPC · JPL
196702	2003 SS_{82}	—	September 18, 2003	Kitt Peak	Spacewatch	·	3.0 km	MPC · JPL
196703	2003 SR_{83}	—	September 18, 2003	Kitt Peak	Spacewatch	·	2.7 km	MPC · JPL
196704	2003 SM_{85}	—	September 16, 2003	Palomar	NEAT	·	3.7 km	MPC · JPL
196705	2003 SC_{86}	—	September 16, 2003	Kitt Peak	Spacewatch	EOS	3.2 km	MPC · JPL
196706	2003 SS_{87}	—	September 17, 2003	Palomar	NEAT	(18466)	3.9 km	MPC · JPL
196707	2003 SB_{89}	—	September 18, 2003	Socorro	LINEAR	·	3.8 km	MPC · JPL
196708	2003 SC_{92}	—	September 18, 2003	Kitt Peak	Spacewatch	·	3.3 km	MPC · JPL
196709	2003 SH_{93}	—	September 18, 2003	Kitt Peak	Spacewatch	·	3.5 km	MPC · JPL
196710	2003 SH_{94}	—	September 18, 2003	Črni Vrh	Mikuž, H.	·	3.8 km	MPC · JPL
196711	2003 SS_{97}	—	September 19, 2003	Kitt Peak	Spacewatch	AST	3.0 km	MPC · JPL
196712	2003 SO_{98}	—	September 19, 2003	Kitt Peak	Spacewatch	·	5.7 km	MPC · JPL
196713	2003 SJ_{101}	—	September 20, 2003	Palomar	NEAT	·	5.3 km	MPC · JPL
196714	2003 SM_{102}	—	September 20, 2003	Socorro	LINEAR	EOS	3.7 km	MPC · JPL
196715	2003 SQ_{102}	—	September 20, 2003	Socorro	LINEAR	·	3.6 km	MPC · JPL
196716	2003 SJ_{103}	—	September 20, 2003	Socorro	LINEAR	·	3.8 km	MPC · JPL
196717	2003 SL_{104}	—	September 20, 2003	Haleakala	NEAT	·	4.9 km	MPC · JPL
196718	2003 SW_{104}	—	September 20, 2003	Socorro	LINEAR	·	5.3 km	MPC · JPL
196719	2003 SM_{107}	—	September 20, 2003	Palomar	NEAT	·	6.1 km	MPC · JPL
196720	2003 SB_{108}	—	September 20, 2003	Palomar	NEAT	·	3.5 km	MPC · JPL
196721	2003 SM_{109}	—	September 20, 2003	Kitt Peak	Spacewatch	·	6.6 km	MPC · JPL
196722	2003 SV_{109}	—	September 20, 2003	Kitt Peak	Spacewatch	(31811)	4.8 km	MPC · JPL
196723	2003 SB_{111}	—	September 20, 2003	Palomar	NEAT	·	5.5 km	MPC · JPL
196724	2003 SD_{114}	—	September 16, 2003	Socorro	LINEAR	·	3.5 km	MPC · JPL
196725	2003 SY_{115}	—	September 16, 2003	Palomar	NEAT	·	4.4 km	MPC · JPL
196726	2003 SB_{118}	—	September 16, 2003	Palomar	NEAT	·	2.1 km	MPC · JPL
196727	2003 SB_{119}	—	September 16, 2003	Palomar	NEAT	·	3.8 km	MPC · JPL
196728	2003 SH_{119}	—	September 17, 2003	Anderson Mesa	LONEOS	·	3.9 km	MPC · JPL
196729	2003 SU_{119}	—	September 17, 2003	Kitt Peak	Spacewatch	AGN	1.6 km	MPC · JPL
196730	2003 SG_{120}	—	September 17, 2003	Kitt Peak	Spacewatch	·	3.2 km	MPC · JPL
196731	2003 SP_{121}	—	September 17, 2003	Kitt Peak	Spacewatch	·	4.1 km	MPC · JPL
196732	2003 ST_{121}	—	September 17, 2003	Haleakala	NEAT	·	4.7 km	MPC · JPL
196733	2003 SA_{122}	—	September 17, 2003	Campo Imperatore	CINEOS	·	3.0 km	MPC · JPL
196734	2003 SM_{125}	—	September 19, 2003	Palomar	NEAT	·	2.6 km	MPC · JPL
196735	2003 SG_{126}	—	September 19, 2003	Palomar	NEAT	·	6.3 km	MPC · JPL
196736 Munkácsy	2003 SH_{127}	Munkácsy	September 19, 2003	Piszkéstető	K. Sárneczky, B. Sipőcz	·	2.3 km	MPC · JPL
196737	2003 SX_{127}	—	September 20, 2003	Socorro	LINEAR	EOS	5.8 km	MPC · JPL
196738	2003 SC_{133}	—	September 20, 2003	Campo Imperatore	CINEOS	·	4.5 km	MPC · JPL
196739	2003 SZ_{133}	—	September 18, 2003	Socorro	LINEAR	KOR	2.7 km	MPC · JPL
196740	2003 SF_{135}	—	September 19, 2003	Socorro	LINEAR	·	3.6 km	MPC · JPL
196741	2003 SJ_{137}	—	September 20, 2003	Palomar	NEAT	·	2.4 km	MPC · JPL
196742	2003 SO_{137}	—	September 21, 2003	Campo Imperatore	CINEOS	·	3.3 km	MPC · JPL
196743	2003 SY_{137}	—	September 21, 2003	Socorro	LINEAR	·	8.3 km	MPC · JPL
196744	2003 SU_{139}	—	September 18, 2003	Kitt Peak	Spacewatch	EOS	2.6 km	MPC · JPL
196745	2003 SY_{139}	—	September 18, 2003	Palomar	NEAT	KOR	2.3 km	MPC · JPL
196746	2003 SU_{142}	—	September 20, 2003	Socorro	LINEAR	·	4.2 km	MPC · JPL
196747	2003 SY_{143}	—	September 21, 2003	Socorro	LINEAR	·	3.1 km	MPC · JPL
196748	2003 SB_{144}	—	September 21, 2003	Kitt Peak	Spacewatch	·	2.9 km	MPC · JPL
196749	2003 SF_{144}	—	September 19, 2003	Palomar	NEAT	·	6.7 km	MPC · JPL
196750	2003 SR_{148}	—	September 16, 2003	Kitt Peak	Spacewatch	·	6.1 km	MPC · JPL
196751	2003 SL_{149}	—	September 16, 2003	Kitt Peak	Spacewatch	·	2.7 km	MPC · JPL
196752	2003 SO_{149}	—	September 16, 2003	Kitt Peak	Spacewatch	KOR	2.3 km	MPC · JPL
196753	2003 SV_{149}	—	September 17, 2003	Socorro	LINEAR	·	3.6 km	MPC · JPL
196754	2003 SM_{151}	—	September 18, 2003	Socorro	LINEAR	·	4.3 km	MPC · JPL
196755	2003 SQ_{153}	—	September 19, 2003	Anderson Mesa	LONEOS	·	4.3 km	MPC · JPL
196756	2003 SU_{154}	—	September 19, 2003	Anderson Mesa	LONEOS	H	520 m	MPC · JPL
196757	2003 SZ_{154}	—	September 19, 2003	Anderson Mesa	LONEOS	WIT	1.6 km	MPC · JPL
196758	2003 SP_{155}	—	September 19, 2003	Anderson Mesa	LONEOS	·	3.9 km	MPC · JPL
196759	2003 SM_{156}	—	September 19, 2003	Anderson Mesa	LONEOS	EOS	3.3 km	MPC · JPL
196760	2003 SO_{160}	—	September 22, 2003	Kitt Peak	Spacewatch	·	3.4 km	MPC · JPL
196761	2003 SL_{162}	—	September 19, 2003	Kitt Peak	Spacewatch	·	4.2 km	MPC · JPL
196762	2003 SP_{162}	—	September 19, 2003	Socorro	LINEAR	·	5.2 km	MPC · JPL
196763	2003 ST_{162}	—	September 19, 2003	Kitt Peak	Spacewatch	THM	3.7 km	MPC · JPL
196764	2003 SU_{162}	—	September 19, 2003	Kitt Peak	Spacewatch	TEL	2.0 km	MPC · JPL
196765	2003 SM_{163}	—	September 19, 2003	Kitt Peak	Spacewatch	·	3.8 km	MPC · JPL
196766	2003 SN_{163}	—	September 19, 2003	Kitt Peak	Spacewatch	AGN	2.1 km	MPC · JPL
196767	2003 SQ_{164}	—	September 20, 2003	Anderson Mesa	LONEOS	·	3.3 km	MPC · JPL
196768	2003 ST_{164}	—	September 20, 2003	Anderson Mesa	LONEOS	·	5.8 km	MPC · JPL
196769	2003 SX_{164}	—	September 20, 2003	Anderson Mesa	LONEOS	·	3.1 km	MPC · JPL
196770	2003 SK_{167}	—	September 22, 2003	Kitt Peak	Spacewatch	PAD	3.6 km	MPC · JPL
196771	2003 SU_{169}	—	September 23, 2003	Haleakala	NEAT	AST	2.7 km	MPC · JPL
196772 Fritzleiber	2003 SQ_{170}	Fritzleiber	September 23, 2003	Saint-Sulpice	B. Christophe	KOR	2.0 km	MPC · JPL
196773	2003 SJ_{171}	—	September 18, 2003	Campo Imperatore	CINEOS	·	3.3 km	MPC · JPL
196774	2003 SW_{177}	—	September 19, 2003	Kitt Peak	Spacewatch	AGN	2.0 km	MPC · JPL
196775	2003 SA_{178}	—	September 19, 2003	Palomar	NEAT	·	3.1 km	MPC · JPL
196776	2003 SV_{180}	—	September 20, 2003	Kitt Peak	Spacewatch	KOR	1.9 km	MPC · JPL
196777	2003 SE_{181}	—	September 20, 2003	Socorro	LINEAR	·	3.2 km	MPC · JPL
196778	2003 SM_{181}	—	September 20, 2003	Kitt Peak	Spacewatch	KOR	2.5 km	MPC · JPL
196779	2003 SN_{181}	—	September 20, 2003	Socorro	LINEAR	·	2.2 km	MPC · JPL
196780	2003 SD_{182}	—	September 20, 2003	Socorro	LINEAR	DOR	4.7 km	MPC · JPL
196781	2003 SA_{184}	—	September 21, 2003	Kitt Peak	Spacewatch	·	2.8 km	MPC · JPL
196782	2003 ST_{184}	—	September 21, 2003	Kitt Peak	Spacewatch	KOR	2.2 km	MPC · JPL
196783	2003 SY_{184}	—	September 21, 2003	Kitt Peak	Spacewatch	·	3.6 km	MPC · JPL
196784	2003 SN_{185}	—	September 22, 2003	Anderson Mesa	LONEOS	·	3.9 km	MPC · JPL
196785	2003 SR_{186}	—	September 22, 2003	Anderson Mesa	LONEOS	GEF	1.9 km	MPC · JPL
196786	2003 SP_{187}	—	September 21, 2003	Haleakala	NEAT	·	3.7 km	MPC · JPL
196787	2003 SY_{187}	—	September 22, 2003	Anderson Mesa	LONEOS	·	4.1 km	MPC · JPL
196788	2003 SF_{188}	—	September 22, 2003	Palomar	NEAT	·	3.5 km	MPC · JPL
196789	2003 SA_{189}	—	September 22, 2003	Anderson Mesa	LONEOS	·	2.7 km	MPC · JPL
196790	2003 SY_{190}	—	September 17, 2003	Kitt Peak	Spacewatch	·	3.6 km	MPC · JPL
196791	2003 SM_{191}	—	September 19, 2003	Kitt Peak	Spacewatch	·	4.5 km	MPC · JPL
196792	2003 SA_{196}	—	September 20, 2003	Palomar	NEAT	·	7.1 km	MPC · JPL
196793	2003 SL_{196}	—	September 20, 2003	Palomar	NEAT	·	3.6 km	MPC · JPL
196794	2003 SK_{197}	—	September 21, 2003	Anderson Mesa	LONEOS	EOS	2.7 km	MPC · JPL
196795	2003 SM_{197}	—	September 21, 2003	Anderson Mesa	LONEOS	·	6.6 km	MPC · JPL
196796	2003 SU_{197}	—	September 21, 2003	Anderson Mesa	LONEOS	EOS	3.3 km	MPC · JPL
196797	2003 SU_{198}	—	September 21, 2003	Anderson Mesa	LONEOS	EOS	3.1 km	MPC · JPL
196798	2003 SG_{199}	—	September 21, 2003	Anderson Mesa	LONEOS	EOS	3.7 km	MPC · JPL
196799	2003 SO_{199}	—	September 21, 2003	Anderson Mesa	LONEOS	·	3.4 km	MPC · JPL
196800	2003 SX_{200}	—	September 25, 2003	Gnosca	S. Sposetti	·	2.8 km	MPC · JPL

== 196801–196900 ==
back to top

Designation			Discovery			Properties		Ref
Permanent	Provisional	Named after	Date	Site	Discoverer(s)	Category	Diam.	Ref
196801	2003 SY_{202}	—	September 22, 2003	Anderson Mesa	LONEOS	·	2.7 km	MPC · JPL
196802	2003 SJ_{204}	—	September 22, 2003	Socorro	LINEAR	·	7.8 km	MPC · JPL
196803	2003 SG_{206}	—	September 23, 2003	Palomar	NEAT	·	4.6 km	MPC · JPL
196804	2003 SZ_{208}	—	September 24, 2003	Palomar	NEAT	DOR	5.7 km	MPC · JPL
196805	2003 SZ_{209}	—	September 25, 2003	Haleakala	NEAT	·	4.4 km	MPC · JPL
196806	2003 SQ_{218}	—	September 28, 2003	Desert Eagle	W. K. Y. Yeung	EOS	3.2 km	MPC · JPL
196807 Beshore	2003 SB_{221}	Beshore	September 26, 2003	Junk Bond	D. Healy	·	4.4 km	MPC · JPL
196808	2003 SH_{223}	—	September 29, 2003	Desert Eagle	W. K. Y. Yeung	·	3.6 km	MPC · JPL
196809	2003 SU_{223}	—	September 27, 2003	Socorro	LINEAR	EUP	8.2 km	MPC · JPL
196810	2003 SC_{224}	—	September 24, 2003	Bergisch Gladbach	W. Bickel	·	1.5 km	MPC · JPL
196811	2003 SF_{225}	—	September 26, 2003	Desert Eagle	W. K. Y. Yeung	·	3.8 km	MPC · JPL
196812	2003 SH_{225}	—	September 26, 2003	Socorro	LINEAR	·	3.2 km	MPC · JPL
196813	2003 SO_{225}	—	September 26, 2003	Socorro	LINEAR	·	2.0 km	MPC · JPL
196814	2003 SU_{225}	—	September 26, 2003	Socorro	LINEAR	·	5.7 km	MPC · JPL
196815	2003 SN_{227}	—	September 27, 2003	Socorro	LINEAR	·	5.3 km	MPC · JPL
196816	2003 SH_{229}	—	September 27, 2003	Kitt Peak	Spacewatch	·	2.4 km	MPC · JPL
196817	2003 SZ_{230}	—	September 24, 2003	Palomar	NEAT	·	3.6 km	MPC · JPL
196818	2003 SJ_{231}	—	September 24, 2003	Palomar	NEAT	·	6.4 km	MPC · JPL
196819	2003 SC_{232}	—	September 24, 2003	Haleakala	NEAT	·	2.4 km	MPC · JPL
196820	2003 SR_{232}	—	September 24, 2003	Haleakala	NEAT	EOS	3.3 km	MPC · JPL
196821	2003 SC_{233}	—	September 25, 2003	Palomar	NEAT	·	3.0 km	MPC · JPL
196822	2003 SM_{234}	—	September 25, 2003	Haleakala	NEAT	·	5.5 km	MPC · JPL
196823	2003 SN_{234}	—	September 25, 2003	Haleakala	NEAT	AEO	2.7 km	MPC · JPL
196824	2003 SS_{235}	—	September 27, 2003	Socorro	LINEAR	·	2.7 km	MPC · JPL
196825	2003 SV_{235}	—	September 27, 2003	Socorro	LINEAR	·	4.5 km	MPC · JPL
196826	2003 SJ_{236}	—	September 26, 2003	Socorro	LINEAR	·	2.6 km	MPC · JPL
196827	2003 SO_{236}	—	September 26, 2003	Socorro	LINEAR	·	2.6 km	MPC · JPL
196828	2003 SB_{237}	—	September 26, 2003	Socorro	LINEAR	·	3.1 km	MPC · JPL
196829	2003 SE_{238}	—	September 27, 2003	Socorro	LINEAR	·	3.6 km	MPC · JPL
196830	2003 SK_{241}	—	September 27, 2003	Kitt Peak	Spacewatch	AGN	1.3 km	MPC · JPL
196831	2003 SA_{243}	—	September 28, 2003	Socorro	LINEAR	KOR	1.9 km	MPC · JPL
196832	2003 SA_{246}	—	September 26, 2003	Socorro	LINEAR	AST	4.2 km	MPC · JPL
196833	2003 SS_{247}	—	September 26, 2003	Socorro	LINEAR	·	5.6 km	MPC · JPL
196834	2003 SZ_{247}	—	September 26, 2003	Socorro	LINEAR	KOR	2.3 km	MPC · JPL
196835	2003 SS_{248}	—	September 26, 2003	Socorro	LINEAR	KOR	2.4 km	MPC · JPL
196836	2003 SY_{248}	—	September 26, 2003	Socorro	LINEAR	AGN	2.0 km	MPC · JPL
196837	2003 SX_{249}	—	September 26, 2003	Socorro	LINEAR	EMA	6.3 km	MPC · JPL
196838	2003 SE_{250}	—	September 26, 2003	Socorro	LINEAR	·	4.5 km	MPC · JPL
196839	2003 SG_{250}	—	September 26, 2003	Socorro	LINEAR	·	4.9 km	MPC · JPL
196840	2003 SM_{253}	—	September 27, 2003	Kitt Peak	Spacewatch	NEM	3.4 km	MPC · JPL
196841	2003 SO_{253}	—	September 27, 2003	Socorro	LINEAR	·	5.3 km	MPC · JPL
196842	2003 SZ_{253}	—	September 27, 2003	Kitt Peak	Spacewatch	·	1.8 km	MPC · JPL
196843	2003 SD_{254}	—	September 27, 2003	Kitt Peak	Spacewatch	·	3.9 km	MPC · JPL
196844	2003 SR_{254}	—	September 27, 2003	Kitt Peak	Spacewatch	·	3.1 km	MPC · JPL
196845	2003 SE_{257}	—	September 28, 2003	Kitt Peak	Spacewatch	·	2.7 km	MPC · JPL
196846	2003 SR_{257}	—	September 28, 2003	Socorro	LINEAR	·	2.6 km	MPC · JPL
196847	2003 SM_{258}	—	September 28, 2003	Kitt Peak	Spacewatch	·	2.9 km	MPC · JPL
196848	2003 SQ_{259}	—	September 28, 2003	Kitt Peak	Spacewatch	·	3.4 km	MPC · JPL
196849	2003 ST_{259}	—	September 28, 2003	Kitt Peak	Spacewatch	·	5.1 km	MPC · JPL
196850	2003 SE_{260}	—	September 29, 2003	Socorro	LINEAR	·	7.5 km	MPC · JPL
196851	2003 SB_{261}	—	September 27, 2003	Socorro	LINEAR	·	3.4 km	MPC · JPL
196852	2003 SR_{262}	—	September 28, 2003	Socorro	LINEAR	KOR	2.2 km	MPC · JPL
196853	2003 SF_{263}	—	September 28, 2003	Socorro	LINEAR	·	3.8 km	MPC · JPL
196854	2003 SW_{266}	—	September 29, 2003	Socorro	LINEAR	·	2.4 km	MPC · JPL
196855	2003 SZ_{266}	—	September 29, 2003	Socorro	LINEAR	EOS	2.8 km	MPC · JPL
196856	2003 SF_{268}	—	September 29, 2003	Kitt Peak	Spacewatch	AGN	2.1 km	MPC · JPL
196857	2003 SL_{268}	—	September 29, 2003	Kitt Peak	Spacewatch	·	2.5 km	MPC · JPL
196858	2003 SB_{269}	—	September 25, 2003	Uccle	T. Pauwels	·	3.6 km	MPC · JPL
196859	2003 SF_{271}	—	September 25, 2003	Haleakala	NEAT	·	4.8 km	MPC · JPL
196860	2003 SG_{272}	—	September 27, 2003	Socorro	LINEAR	·	2.9 km	MPC · JPL
196861	2003 SL_{272}	—	September 27, 2003	Socorro	LINEAR	·	3.7 km	MPC · JPL
196862	2003 SC_{273}	—	September 27, 2003	Socorro	LINEAR	EOS	3.6 km	MPC · JPL
196863	2003 SX_{277}	—	September 30, 2003	Socorro	LINEAR	EOS	2.1 km	MPC · JPL
196864	2003 SL_{278}	—	September 30, 2003	Socorro	LINEAR	·	3.8 km	MPC · JPL
196865	2003 ST_{278}	—	September 30, 2003	Socorro	LINEAR	·	6.9 km	MPC · JPL
196866	2003 SY_{280}	—	September 18, 2003	Kitt Peak	Spacewatch	AGN	1.8 km	MPC · JPL
196867	2003 SF_{282}	—	September 19, 2003	Anderson Mesa	LONEOS	·	2.9 km	MPC · JPL
196868	2003 SG_{282}	—	September 19, 2003	Anderson Mesa	LONEOS	·	3.3 km	MPC · JPL
196869	2003 ST_{284}	—	September 20, 2003	Socorro	LINEAR	EOS	2.4 km	MPC · JPL
196870	2003 SC_{289}	—	September 28, 2003	Socorro	LINEAR	EOS	4.1 km	MPC · JPL
196871	2003 SY_{289}	—	September 28, 2003	Anderson Mesa	LONEOS	·	3.2 km	MPC · JPL
196872	2003 SS_{292}	—	September 25, 2003	Haleakala	NEAT	·	4.0 km	MPC · JPL
196873	2003 SB_{293}	—	September 27, 2003	Socorro	LINEAR	·	5.1 km	MPC · JPL
196874	2003 SD_{294}	—	September 28, 2003	Socorro	LINEAR	H	950 m	MPC · JPL
196875	2003 SN_{298}	—	September 18, 2003	Haleakala	NEAT	·	6.6 km	MPC · JPL
196876	2003 SW_{299}	—	September 16, 2003	Kitt Peak	Spacewatch	·	3.0 km	MPC · JPL
196877	2003 SJ_{300}	—	September 17, 2003	Palomar	NEAT	·	2.9 km	MPC · JPL
196878	2003 SW_{304}	—	September 17, 2003	Palomar	NEAT	·	4.2 km	MPC · JPL
196879	2003 SE_{306}	—	September 30, 2003	Socorro	LINEAR	·	4.0 km	MPC · JPL
196880	2003 SY_{307}	—	September 27, 2003	Socorro	LINEAR	·	5.6 km	MPC · JPL
196881	2003 SN_{308}	—	September 29, 2003	Anderson Mesa	LONEOS	·	5.8 km	MPC · JPL
196882	2003 SX_{309}	—	September 28, 2003	Socorro	LINEAR	·	3.7 km	MPC · JPL
196883	2003 SK_{311}	—	September 29, 2003	Socorro	LINEAR	·	3.7 km	MPC · JPL
196884	2003 SE_{312}	—	September 30, 2003	Kitt Peak	Spacewatch	KOR	2.8 km	MPC · JPL
196885	2003 SP_{314}	—	September 28, 2003	Socorro	LINEAR	·	2.6 km	MPC · JPL
196886	2003 SF_{317}	—	September 21, 2003	Kitt Peak	Spacewatch	KOR	2.2 km	MPC · JPL
196887	2003 SE_{320}	—	September 17, 2003	Kitt Peak	Spacewatch	·	2.9 km	MPC · JPL
196888	2003 SM_{320}	—	September 17, 2003	Kitt Peak	Spacewatch	·	5.9 km	MPC · JPL
196889	2003 SQ_{321}	—	September 21, 2003	Kitt Peak	Spacewatch	·	4.2 km	MPC · JPL
196890	2003 SK_{322}	—	September 28, 2003	Kitt Peak	Spacewatch	KOR	2.0 km	MPC · JPL
196891	2003 SK_{329}	—	September 22, 2003	Anderson Mesa	LONEOS	·	1.9 km	MPC · JPL
196892	2003 SJ_{347}	—	September 18, 2003	Kitt Peak	Spacewatch	·	2.1 km	MPC · JPL
196893	2003 TS	—	October 2, 2003	Essen	Essen	EOS	2.5 km	MPC · JPL
196894	2003 TL_{3}	—	October 3, 2003	Haleakala	NEAT	·	2.5 km	MPC · JPL
196895	2003 TM_{3}	—	October 4, 2003	Goodricke-Pigott	Reddy, V.	·	3.1 km	MPC · JPL
196896	2003 TA_{5}	—	October 1, 2003	Kitt Peak	Spacewatch	EOS	5.1 km	MPC · JPL
196897	2003 TR_{6}	—	October 1, 2003	Anderson Mesa	LONEOS	·	4.8 km	MPC · JPL
196898	2003 TF_{10}	—	October 15, 2003	Socorro	LINEAR	·	5.6 km	MPC · JPL
196899	2003 TX_{10}	—	October 15, 2003	Palomar	NEAT	KOR	2.4 km	MPC · JPL
196900	2003 TA_{11}	—	October 14, 2003	Anderson Mesa	LONEOS	·	5.2 km	MPC · JPL

== 196901–197000 ==
back to top

Designation			Discovery			Properties		Ref
Permanent	Provisional	Named after	Date	Site	Discoverer(s)	Category	Diam.	Ref
196901	2003 TS_{11}	—	October 14, 2003	Anderson Mesa	LONEOS	H	800 m	MPC · JPL
196902	2003 TG_{14}	—	October 4, 2003	Kitt Peak	Spacewatch	·	6.4 km	MPC · JPL
196903	2003 TA_{16}	—	October 15, 2003	Anderson Mesa	LONEOS	·	2.7 km	MPC · JPL
196904	2003 TC_{16}	—	October 15, 2003	Anderson Mesa	LONEOS	HOF	5.9 km	MPC · JPL
196905	2003 TH_{17}	—	October 15, 2003	Anderson Mesa	LONEOS	KOR	2.2 km	MPC · JPL
196906	2003 TF_{18}	—	October 14, 2003	Palomar	NEAT	·	2.0 km	MPC · JPL
196907	2003 TC_{19}	—	October 15, 2003	Anderson Mesa	LONEOS	·	2.9 km	MPC · JPL
196908	2003 TU_{21}	—	October 1, 2003	Anderson Mesa	LONEOS	KOR	2.5 km	MPC · JPL
196909	2003 TF_{22}	—	October 1, 2003	Kitt Peak	Spacewatch	·	3.9 km	MPC · JPL
196910	2003 TL_{29}	—	October 1, 2003	Kitt Peak	Spacewatch	·	3.8 km	MPC · JPL
196911	2003 TN_{30}	—	October 1, 2003	Kitt Peak	Spacewatch	·	1.9 km	MPC · JPL
196912	2003 TR_{30}	—	October 1, 2003	Kitt Peak	Spacewatch	·	3.9 km	MPC · JPL
196913	2003 TX_{33}	—	October 1, 2003	Kitt Peak	Spacewatch	KOR	1.7 km	MPC · JPL
196914	2003 TJ_{37}	—	October 2, 2003	Kitt Peak	Spacewatch	GEF	2.0 km	MPC · JPL
196915	2003 TO_{45}	—	October 3, 2003	Kitt Peak	Spacewatch	·	3.6 km	MPC · JPL
196916	2003 TS_{45}	—	October 3, 2003	Kitt Peak	Spacewatch	·	3.6 km	MPC · JPL
196917	2003 TD_{48}	—	October 3, 2003	Kitt Peak	Spacewatch	·	3.4 km	MPC · JPL
196918	2003 TE_{54}	—	October 5, 2003	Kitt Peak	Spacewatch	HOF	3.6 km	MPC · JPL
196919	2003 TP_{54}	—	October 5, 2003	Kitt Peak	Spacewatch	·	2.7 km	MPC · JPL
196920	2003 TX_{54}	—	October 5, 2003	Kitt Peak	Spacewatch	·	2.5 km	MPC · JPL
196921	2003 TL_{57}	—	October 5, 2003	Socorro	LINEAR	·	4.2 km	MPC · JPL
196922	2003 US_{1}	—	October 16, 2003	Kitt Peak	Spacewatch	AGN	1.8 km	MPC · JPL
196923	2003 UG_{2}	—	October 16, 2003	Kitt Peak	Spacewatch	EOS	2.3 km	MPC · JPL
196924	2003 UX_{3}	—	October 16, 2003	Kitt Peak	Spacewatch	·	4.0 km	MPC · JPL
196925	2003 UF_{4}	—	October 16, 2003	Palomar	NEAT	·	7.2 km	MPC · JPL
196926	2003 UG_{5}	—	October 18, 2003	Wrightwood	J. W. Young	·	4.3 km	MPC · JPL
196927	2003 UQ_{6}	—	October 18, 2003	Palomar	NEAT	EUP	6.1 km	MPC · JPL
196928	2003 UB_{7}	—	October 16, 2003	Socorro	LINEAR	T_{j} (2.99)	6.6 km	MPC · JPL
196929	2003 UF_{10}	—	October 17, 2003	Anderson Mesa	LONEOS	·	6.9 km	MPC · JPL
196930	2003 UA_{11}	—	October 19, 2003	Kitt Peak	Spacewatch	·	3.7 km	MPC · JPL
196931	2003 UF_{12}	—	October 20, 2003	Kitt Peak	Spacewatch	·	1.9 km	MPC · JPL
196932	2003 UV_{12}	—	October 16, 2003	Kitt Peak	Spacewatch	·	3.7 km	MPC · JPL
196933	2003 UY_{14}	—	October 16, 2003	Kitt Peak	Spacewatch	EOS	3.3 km	MPC · JPL
196934	2003 UD_{15}	—	October 16, 2003	Kitt Peak	Spacewatch	·	2.6 km	MPC · JPL
196935	2003 UH_{16}	—	October 16, 2003	Anderson Mesa	LONEOS	·	6.5 km	MPC · JPL
196936	2003 UL_{16}	—	October 16, 2003	Anderson Mesa	LONEOS	THM	5.3 km	MPC · JPL
196937	2003 US_{16}	—	October 16, 2003	Palomar	NEAT	·	3.8 km	MPC · JPL
196938 Delgordon	2003 UO_{20}	Delgordon	October 22, 2003	Junk Bond	D. Healy	·	3.7 km	MPC · JPL
196939	2003 UB_{23}	—	October 20, 2003	Palomar	NEAT	·	3.9 km	MPC · JPL
196940	2003 UW_{23}	—	October 22, 2003	Kitt Peak	Spacewatch	THM	4.6 km	MPC · JPL
196941	2003 UZ_{23}	—	October 23, 2003	Needville	J. Dellinger, D. Wells	EOS	2.6 km	MPC · JPL
196942	2003 UM_{24}	—	October 23, 2003	Socorro	LINEAR	H	760 m	MPC · JPL
196943	2003 UC_{28}	—	October 23, 2003	Anderson Mesa	LONEOS	·	6.1 km	MPC · JPL
196944	2003 UO_{28}	—	October 19, 2003	Kitt Peak	Spacewatch	·	4.4 km	MPC · JPL
196945 Guerin	2003 UV_{29}	Guerin	October 26, 2003	Ottmarsheim	C. Rinner	·	2.0 km	MPC · JPL
196946	2003 UX_{31}	—	October 16, 2003	Kitt Peak	Spacewatch	·	2.6 km	MPC · JPL
196947	2003 UT_{35}	—	October 16, 2003	Palomar	NEAT	·	5.7 km	MPC · JPL
196948	2003 US_{38}	—	October 26, 2003	Kleť	Kleť	·	4.2 km	MPC · JPL
196949	2003 UR_{40}	—	October 16, 2003	Anderson Mesa	LONEOS	·	6.2 km	MPC · JPL
196950	2003 UZ_{41}	—	October 17, 2003	Kitt Peak	Spacewatch	·	2.2 km	MPC · JPL
196951	2003 UO_{46}	—	October 18, 2003	Kitt Peak	Spacewatch	KOR	1.9 km	MPC · JPL
196952	2003 UX_{48}	—	October 16, 2003	Anderson Mesa	LONEOS	·	2.5 km	MPC · JPL
196953	2003 UJ_{50}	—	October 17, 2003	Kitt Peak	Spacewatch	·	5.4 km	MPC · JPL
196954	2003 UA_{52}	—	October 18, 2003	Palomar	NEAT	·	3.4 km	MPC · JPL
196955	2003 UQ_{52}	—	October 18, 2003	Palomar	NEAT	·	4.0 km	MPC · JPL
196956	2003 UR_{52}	—	October 18, 2003	Palomar	NEAT	·	3.1 km	MPC · JPL
196957	2003 UV_{52}	—	October 18, 2003	Palomar	NEAT	EOS	3.0 km	MPC · JPL
196958	2003 UK_{53}	—	October 18, 2003	Palomar	NEAT	·	2.8 km	MPC · JPL
196959	2003 UM_{53}	—	October 18, 2003	Palomar	NEAT	·	3.2 km	MPC · JPL
196960	2003 UA_{54}	—	October 18, 2003	Palomar	NEAT	TIR	2.7 km	MPC · JPL
196961	2003 UE_{54}	—	October 18, 2003	Palomar	NEAT	EOS	5.1 km	MPC · JPL
196962	2003 UR_{54}	—	October 18, 2003	Palomar	NEAT	H	1.6 km	MPC · JPL
196963	2003 UD_{56}	—	October 19, 2003	Goodricke-Pigott	R. A. Tucker	·	5.0 km	MPC · JPL
196964	2003 UT_{56}	—	October 23, 2003	Anderson Mesa	LONEOS	EOS	3.4 km	MPC · JPL
196965	2003 UV_{56}	—	October 23, 2003	Kitt Peak	Spacewatch	·	3.0 km	MPC · JPL
196966	2003 UC_{57}	—	October 24, 2003	Socorro	LINEAR	MRX	1.9 km	MPC · JPL
196967	2003 UK_{57}	—	October 27, 2003	Kvistaberg	Uppsala-DLR Asteroid Survey	·	6.6 km	MPC · JPL
196968	2003 UR_{57}	—	October 16, 2003	Palomar	NEAT	·	6.3 km	MPC · JPL
196969	2003 UV_{58}	—	October 16, 2003	Kitt Peak	Spacewatch	·	7.2 km	MPC · JPL
196970	2003 UU_{59}	—	October 17, 2003	Anderson Mesa	LONEOS	·	5.8 km	MPC · JPL
196971	2003 UG_{61}	—	October 16, 2003	Palomar	NEAT	·	2.4 km	MPC · JPL
196972	2003 UO_{62}	—	October 16, 2003	Anderson Mesa	LONEOS	·	4.3 km	MPC · JPL
196973	2003 UP_{62}	—	October 16, 2003	Anderson Mesa	LONEOS	·	3.4 km	MPC · JPL
196974	2003 UC_{64}	—	October 16, 2003	Anderson Mesa	LONEOS	·	4.7 km	MPC · JPL
196975	2003 UU_{64}	—	October 16, 2003	Anderson Mesa	LONEOS	·	5.6 km	MPC · JPL
196976	2003 UA_{65}	—	October 16, 2003	Anderson Mesa	LONEOS	EOS	3.7 km	MPC · JPL
196977	2003 UN_{66}	—	October 16, 2003	Palomar	NEAT	·	5.2 km	MPC · JPL
196978	2003 UZ_{69}	—	October 18, 2003	Kitt Peak	Spacewatch	·	2.7 km	MPC · JPL
196979	2003 UN_{70}	—	October 18, 2003	Kitt Peak	Spacewatch	·	3.6 km	MPC · JPL
196980	2003 UC_{75}	—	October 17, 2003	Anderson Mesa	LONEOS	NAE	5.7 km	MPC · JPL
196981	2003 UV_{76}	—	October 17, 2003	Anderson Mesa	LONEOS	EOS	2.7 km	MPC · JPL
196982	2003 UC_{79}	—	October 18, 2003	Haleakala	NEAT	·	6.1 km	MPC · JPL
196983	2003 UH_{79}	—	October 19, 2003	Socorro	LINEAR	·	4.1 km	MPC · JPL
196984	2003 UQ_{79}	—	October 19, 2003	Kitt Peak	Spacewatch	·	3.5 km	MPC · JPL
196985	2003 UY_{79}	—	October 18, 2003	Goodricke-Pigott	R. A. Tucker	·	6.1 km	MPC · JPL
196986	2003 UC_{80}	—	October 17, 2003	Goodricke-Pigott	R. A. Tucker	EUP	8.2 km	MPC · JPL
196987	2003 UO_{81}	—	October 16, 2003	Haleakala	NEAT	·	3.5 km	MPC · JPL
196988	2003 UC_{82}	—	October 18, 2003	Haleakala	NEAT	·	4.0 km	MPC · JPL
196989	2003 UF_{83}	—	October 16, 2003	Haleakala	NEAT	·	3.4 km	MPC · JPL
196990	2003 UH_{83}	—	October 17, 2003	Anderson Mesa	LONEOS	EOS	3.3 km	MPC · JPL
196991	2003 UF_{84}	—	October 18, 2003	Kitt Peak	Spacewatch	EOS	2.2 km	MPC · JPL
196992	2003 US_{84}	—	October 18, 2003	Kitt Peak	Spacewatch	·	3.3 km	MPC · JPL
196993	2003 UJ_{85}	—	October 18, 2003	Kitt Peak	Spacewatch	·	2.4 km	MPC · JPL
196994	2003 UW_{85}	—	October 18, 2003	Palomar	NEAT	·	7.6 km	MPC · JPL
196995	2003 US_{87}	—	October 19, 2003	Anderson Mesa	LONEOS	·	6.1 km	MPC · JPL
196996	2003 UZ_{88}	—	October 19, 2003	Anderson Mesa	LONEOS	·	3.5 km	MPC · JPL
196997	2003 UA_{90}	—	October 20, 2003	Kitt Peak	Spacewatch	·	3.4 km	MPC · JPL
196998	2003 UV_{93}	—	October 18, 2003	Kitt Peak	Spacewatch	·	2.8 km	MPC · JPL
196999	2003 UH_{94}	—	October 18, 2003	Kitt Peak	Spacewatch	·	2.8 km	MPC · JPL
197000	2003 UE_{96}	—	October 18, 2003	Kitt Peak	Spacewatch	HOF	4.1 km	MPC · JPL

back to top

== See also ==
- Meanings of minor-planet names: 196001–197000
