= Meanings of minor-planet names: 197001–198000 =

As minor planet discoveries are confirmed, they are given a permanent number by the IAU's Minor Planet Center (MPC), and the discoverers can then submit names for them, following the IAU's naming conventions. The list below concerns those minor planets in the specified number-range that have received names, and explains the meanings of those names.

Official naming citations of newly named small Solar System bodies are approved and published in a bulletin by IAU's Working Group for Small Bodies Nomenclature (WGSBN). Before May 2021, citations were published in MPC's Minor Planet Circulars for many decades. Recent citations can also be found on the JPL Small-Body Database (SBDB). Until his death in 2016, German astronomer Lutz D. Schmadel compiled these citations into the Dictionary of Minor Planet Names (DMP) and regularly updated the collection.

Based on Paul Herget's The Names of the Minor Planets, Schmadel also researched the unclear origin of numerous asteroids, most of which had been named prior to World War II. This article incorporates text from this source, which is in the public domain: SBDB New namings may only be added to this list below after official publication as the preannouncement of names is condemned. The WGSBN publishes a comprehensive guideline for the naming rules of non-cometary small Solar System bodies.

== 197001–197100 ==
Named minor planet	Provisional	This minor planet was named for...	Ref · Catalog
There are no named minor planets in this number range

== 197101–197200 ==
back to top

Named minor planet	Provisional	This minor planet was named for...	Ref · Catalog
197189 Raymond	2003 UL_{317}	Sean Raymond (born 1977), an American astronomer with the Sloan Digital Sky Survey	JPL · 197189
197192 Kazinczy	2003 VK	Ferenc Kazinczy (1759–1831), a Hungarian author, poet and translator.	IAU · 197192
197196 Jamestaylor	2003 VB_{8}	James Taylor (born 1965) is in charge of publicity for the Huachuca Astronomy Club in Arizona, United States	JPL · 197196
197200 Johnmclaughlin	2003 WJ	John McLaughlin (born 1942), English guitarist, composer, bandleader and an early pioneer of jazz fusion.	JPL · 197200

== 197201–197300 ==
back to top

Named minor planet	Provisional	This minor planet was named for...	Ref · Catalog
There are no named minor planets in this number range

== 197301–197400 ==
back to top

Named minor planet	Provisional	This minor planet was named for...	Ref · Catalog
There are no named minor planets in this number range

== 197401–197500 ==
back to top

Named minor planet	Provisional	This minor planet was named for...	Ref · Catalog
197449 Sarahwinfrey	2003 YK_{111}	Sarah Winfrey, American science advocate who advanced cislunar space situational awareness to keep spacecraft and humans at the Moon safe.	IAU · 197449

== 197501–197600 ==
back to top

Named minor planet	Provisional	This minor planet was named for...	Ref · Catalog
197525 Versteeg	2004 DG_{65}	Maarten H. Versteeg (born 1960), a Staff Engineer at the Southwest Research Institute who worked for the New Horizons mission to Pluto as the lead for the Alice UV Spectrometer Instrument Software	JPL · 197525

== 197601–197700 ==
back to top

Named minor planet	Provisional	This minor planet was named for...	Ref · Catalog
There are no named minor planets in this number range

== 197701–197800 ==
back to top

Named minor planet	Provisional	This minor planet was named for...	Ref · Catalog
197707 Paulnohr	2004 PN	Paul Nohr (1939–2006), coordinator of the Cincinnati Observatory who restored the observatory's 1845 Merz and Mahler and the 1904 Alvan Clark telescopes	JPL · 197707
197708 Kalipona	2004 PQ_{1}	Clifford "Kalipona" Livermore (born 1941) has performed astronomy outreach on Mauna Kea for over 40 years. His efforts have helped locals and visitors to appreciate the value of maintaining Mauna Kea as a protected dark-sky site.	JPL · 197708

== 197801–197900 ==
back to top

Named minor planet	Provisional	This minor planet was named for...	Ref · Catalog
197845 Michaelvincent	2004 PU_{110}	Michael A. Vincent (born 1978), an assistant director for research and development at the Southwest Research Institute, who worked for the New Horizons mission to Pluto as the REX Instrument Project Manager and Deputy Payload Systems Engineer	JPL · 197845
197856 Tafelmusik	2004 QH_{16}	Tafelmusik Baroque Orchestra, a Canadian Baroque orchestra based in Toronto	JPL · 197856
197864 Florentpagny	2004 RQ_{1}	Florent Pagny (born 1961), a French musician	JPL · 197864
197870 Erkman	2004 RC_{8}	Suren Erkman (born 1955), a professor of the University of Lausanne and an industrial ecology specialist. He is a friend of Swiss amateur astronomer Michel Ory who discovered this minor planet.	JPL · 197870

== 197901–198000 ==
back to top

Named minor planet	Provisional	This minor planet was named for...	Ref · Catalog
There are no named minor planets in this number range

back to top

Preceded by 196,001–197,000	Meanings of minor-planet names List of minor planets: 197,001–198,000	Succeeded by 198,001–199,000
