= List of minor planets: 197001–198000 =

The following is a partial list of minor planets, running from minor-planet number 197001 through 198000, inclusive. The primary data for this and other partial lists is based on JPL's "Small-Body Orbital Elements" and data available from the Minor Planet Center. Critical list information is also provided by the MPC, unless otherwise specified from Lowell Observatory. A detailed description of the table's columns and additional sources are given on the main page including a complete list of every page in this series, and a statistical break-up on the dynamical classification of minor planets.

Also see the summary list of all named bodies in numerical and alphabetical order, and the corresponding naming citations for the number range of this particular list. New namings may only be added to this list after official publication, as the preannouncement of names is condemned by the Working Group for Small Bodies Nomenclature of the International Astronomical Union.

Near-Earth obj.	MBA (inner)	MBA (outer)	Centaur
Mars-crosser	MBA (middle)	Jupiter trojan	Trans-Neptunian obj.
Unclassified

== 197001–197100 ==
Designation			Discovery			Properties		Ref
Permanent	Provisional	Named after	Date	Site	Discoverer(s)	Category	Diam.	Ref
197001	2003 UH_{96}	—	October 18, 2003	Kitt Peak	Spacewatch	·	4.0 km	MPC · JPL
197002	2003 UV_{96}	—	October 19, 2003	Socorro	LINEAR	EMA	6.7 km	MPC · JPL
197003	2003 UN_{97}	—	October 19, 2003	Kitt Peak	Spacewatch	·	4.4 km	MPC · JPL
197004	2003 UT_{97}	—	October 19, 2003	Kitt Peak	Spacewatch	·	4.2 km	MPC · JPL
197005	2003 UY_{97}	—	October 19, 2003	Kitt Peak	Spacewatch	·	5.1 km	MPC · JPL
197006	2003 UZ_{97}	—	October 19, 2003	Kitt Peak	Spacewatch	KOR	2.5 km	MPC · JPL
197007	2003 UB_{99}	—	October 19, 2003	Kitt Peak	Spacewatch	·	6.0 km	MPC · JPL
197008	2003 UO_{100}	—	October 19, 2003	Haleakala	NEAT	·	5.0 km	MPC · JPL
197009	2003 UZ_{100}	—	October 20, 2003	Palomar	NEAT	·	5.2 km	MPC · JPL
197010	2003 UB_{101}	—	October 20, 2003	Palomar	NEAT	AGN	1.9 km	MPC · JPL
197011	2003 UC_{101}	—	October 20, 2003	Palomar	NEAT	·	3.0 km	MPC · JPL
197012	2003 UG_{102}	—	October 20, 2003	Socorro	LINEAR	·	4.5 km	MPC · JPL
197013	2003 UU_{102}	—	October 20, 2003	Kitt Peak	Spacewatch	·	3.0 km	MPC · JPL
197014	2003 UC_{103}	—	October 20, 2003	Kitt Peak	Spacewatch	·	2.7 km	MPC · JPL
197015	2003 UD_{103}	—	October 20, 2003	Kitt Peak	Spacewatch	KOR	2.7 km	MPC · JPL
197016	2003 UY_{104}	—	October 18, 2003	Kitt Peak	Spacewatch	·	3.1 km	MPC · JPL
197017	2003 UL_{105}	—	October 18, 2003	Kitt Peak	Spacewatch	·	2.5 km	MPC · JPL
197018	2003 UL_{106}	—	October 18, 2003	Kitt Peak	Spacewatch	·	2.4 km	MPC · JPL
197019	2003 US_{107}	—	October 19, 2003	Kitt Peak	Spacewatch	·	2.4 km	MPC · JPL
197020	2003 UV_{107}	—	October 19, 2003	Kitt Peak	Spacewatch	KOR	2.0 km	MPC · JPL
197021	2003 UR_{112}	—	October 20, 2003	Socorro	LINEAR	EOS	3.3 km	MPC · JPL
197022	2003 UY_{113}	—	October 20, 2003	Socorro	LINEAR	·	2.2 km	MPC · JPL
197023	2003 UZ_{114}	—	October 20, 2003	Kitt Peak	Spacewatch	KOR	2.0 km	MPC · JPL
197024	2003 UG_{116}	—	October 21, 2003	Socorro	LINEAR	·	3.1 km	MPC · JPL
197025	2003 UX_{120}	—	October 18, 2003	Kitt Peak	Spacewatch	·	1.8 km	MPC · JPL
197026	2003 UY_{122}	—	October 19, 2003	Palomar	NEAT	·	5.0 km	MPC · JPL
197027	2003 UA_{124}	—	October 20, 2003	Palomar	NEAT	EUN	1.9 km	MPC · JPL
197028	2003 UJ_{124}	—	October 20, 2003	Palomar	NEAT	·	3.4 km	MPC · JPL
197029	2003 UA_{125}	—	October 20, 2003	Kitt Peak	Spacewatch	·	3.4 km	MPC · JPL
197030	2003 UM_{126}	—	October 20, 2003	Palomar	NEAT	·	3.6 km	MPC · JPL
197031	2003 UK_{128}	—	October 21, 2003	Palomar	NEAT	·	3.2 km	MPC · JPL
197032	2003 UZ_{129}	—	October 18, 2003	Palomar	NEAT	EOS	3.5 km	MPC · JPL
197033	2003 UB_{131}	—	October 19, 2003	Palomar	NEAT	EOS	2.3 km	MPC · JPL
197034	2003 UP_{131}	—	October 19, 2003	Palomar	NEAT	·	5.7 km	MPC · JPL
197035	2003 UG_{132}	—	October 19, 2003	Palomar	NEAT	·	4.1 km	MPC · JPL
197036	2003 UQ_{132}	—	October 19, 2003	Palomar	NEAT	·	6.0 km	MPC · JPL
197037	2003 UG_{133}	—	October 20, 2003	Palomar	NEAT	·	6.2 km	MPC · JPL
197038	2003 UC_{134}	—	October 20, 2003	Palomar	NEAT	EOS	3.2 km	MPC · JPL
197039	2003 UH_{134}	—	October 20, 2003	Palomar	NEAT	·	6.2 km	MPC · JPL
197040	2003 UO_{135}	—	October 21, 2003	Anderson Mesa	LONEOS	AGN	1.6 km	MPC · JPL
197041	2003 UP_{135}	—	October 21, 2003	Palomar	NEAT	·	4.4 km	MPC · JPL
197042	2003 UW_{135}	—	October 21, 2003	Palomar	NEAT	·	5.5 km	MPC · JPL
197043	2003 UD_{137}	—	October 21, 2003	Socorro	LINEAR	·	3.2 km	MPC · JPL
197044	2003 UZ_{137}	—	October 21, 2003	Socorro	LINEAR	·	4.7 km	MPC · JPL
197045	2003 UC_{139}	—	October 16, 2003	Palomar	NEAT	·	3.7 km	MPC · JPL
197046	2003 UE_{140}	—	October 16, 2003	Anderson Mesa	LONEOS	EOS	2.6 km	MPC · JPL
197047	2003 UN_{140}	—	October 16, 2003	Anderson Mesa	LONEOS	·	1.9 km	MPC · JPL
197048	2003 UO_{140}	—	October 16, 2003	Anderson Mesa	LONEOS	·	3.2 km	MPC · JPL
197049	2003 UT_{141}	—	October 18, 2003	Anderson Mesa	LONEOS	EOS	2.7 km	MPC · JPL
197050	2003 UW_{142}	—	October 18, 2003	Anderson Mesa	LONEOS	·	3.9 km	MPC · JPL
197051	2003 UD_{143}	—	October 18, 2003	Anderson Mesa	LONEOS	·	5.9 km	MPC · JPL
197052	2003 UK_{145}	—	October 18, 2003	Anderson Mesa	LONEOS	·	3.0 km	MPC · JPL
197053	2003 UH_{147}	—	October 18, 2003	Anderson Mesa	LONEOS	·	7.0 km	MPC · JPL
197054	2003 UH_{149}	—	October 20, 2003	Socorro	LINEAR	·	2.6 km	MPC · JPL
197055	2003 UC_{150}	—	October 20, 2003	Socorro	LINEAR	HYG	4.0 km	MPC · JPL
197056	2003 UJ_{150}	—	October 20, 2003	Socorro	LINEAR	·	3.4 km	MPC · JPL
197057	2003 UC_{151}	—	October 21, 2003	Kitt Peak	Spacewatch	·	3.3 km	MPC · JPL
197058	2003 UV_{152}	—	October 21, 2003	Socorro	LINEAR	EUP	7.5 km	MPC · JPL
197059	2003 UZ_{153}	—	October 19, 2003	Kitt Peak	Spacewatch	·	2.7 km	MPC · JPL
197060	2003 UK_{154}	—	October 20, 2003	Palomar	NEAT	·	3.3 km	MPC · JPL
197061	2003 UN_{157}	—	October 20, 2003	Palomar	NEAT	EOS	2.8 km	MPC · JPL
197062	2003 UU_{157}	—	October 20, 2003	Kitt Peak	Spacewatch	THM	3.1 km	MPC · JPL
197063	2003 UO_{158}	—	October 20, 2003	Kitt Peak	Spacewatch	·	2.7 km	MPC · JPL
197064	2003 UB_{159}	—	October 20, 2003	Kitt Peak	Spacewatch	·	4.2 km	MPC · JPL
197065	2003 UK_{160}	—	October 21, 2003	Kitt Peak	Spacewatch	·	2.1 km	MPC · JPL
197066	2003 UO_{160}	—	October 21, 2003	Kitt Peak	Spacewatch	·	2.5 km	MPC · JPL
197067	2003 UJ_{161}	—	October 21, 2003	Anderson Mesa	LONEOS	·	3.5 km	MPC · JPL
197068	2003 UN_{162}	—	October 21, 2003	Socorro	LINEAR	·	4.0 km	MPC · JPL
197069	2003 UM_{163}	—	October 21, 2003	Socorro	LINEAR	·	3.2 km	MPC · JPL
197070	2003 UN_{163}	—	October 21, 2003	Socorro	LINEAR	EMA	6.1 km	MPC · JPL
197071	2003 UQ_{163}	—	October 21, 2003	Socorro	LINEAR	·	2.9 km	MPC · JPL
197072	2003 UJ_{167}	—	October 22, 2003	Socorro	LINEAR	·	5.1 km	MPC · JPL
197073	2003 UV_{168}	—	October 22, 2003	Socorro	LINEAR	·	5.0 km	MPC · JPL
197074	2003 UU_{169}	—	October 22, 2003	Kitt Peak	Spacewatch	·	2.5 km	MPC · JPL
197075	2003 UE_{170}	—	October 22, 2003	Kitt Peak	Spacewatch	·	4.9 km	MPC · JPL
197076	2003 UK_{172}	—	October 20, 2003	Socorro	LINEAR	VER	6.3 km	MPC · JPL
197077	2003 UR_{173}	—	October 20, 2003	Kitt Peak	Spacewatch	EOS	4.5 km	MPC · JPL
197078	2003 UT_{174}	—	October 21, 2003	Kitt Peak	Spacewatch	·	4.2 km	MPC · JPL
197079	2003 UU_{174}	—	October 21, 2003	Kitt Peak	Spacewatch	·	5.0 km	MPC · JPL
197080	2003 UY_{176}	—	October 21, 2003	Palomar	NEAT	TEL	1.9 km	MPC · JPL
197081	2003 UF_{177}	—	October 21, 2003	Palomar	NEAT	·	3.7 km	MPC · JPL
197082	2003 UR_{177}	—	October 21, 2003	Palomar	NEAT	·	2.6 km	MPC · JPL
197083	2003 UY_{178}	—	October 21, 2003	Palomar	NEAT	EOS	4.3 km	MPC · JPL
197084	2003 UF_{179}	—	October 21, 2003	Socorro	LINEAR	·	6.8 km	MPC · JPL
197085	2003 UK_{179}	—	October 21, 2003	Socorro	LINEAR	·	2.6 km	MPC · JPL
197086	2003 UE_{182}	—	October 21, 2003	Palomar	NEAT	·	3.6 km	MPC · JPL
197087	2003 UG_{182}	—	October 21, 2003	Palomar	NEAT	KOR	2.3 km	MPC · JPL
197088	2003 UH_{182}	—	October 21, 2003	Palomar	NEAT	·	3.7 km	MPC · JPL
197089	2003 UO_{182}	—	October 21, 2003	Palomar	NEAT	·	3.0 km	MPC · JPL
197090	2003 UV_{182}	—	October 21, 2003	Palomar	NEAT	·	3.5 km	MPC · JPL
197091	2003 UO_{183}	—	October 21, 2003	Palomar	NEAT	KOR	2.5 km	MPC · JPL
197092	2003 UX_{183}	—	October 21, 2003	Palomar	NEAT	·	2.8 km	MPC · JPL
197093	2003 UY_{184}	—	October 21, 2003	Palomar	NEAT	EOS	4.1 km	MPC · JPL
197094	2003 UC_{186}	—	October 22, 2003	Socorro	LINEAR	EOS	2.7 km	MPC · JPL
197095	2003 UW_{187}	—	October 22, 2003	Socorro	LINEAR	HYG	4.7 km	MPC · JPL
197096	2003 UB_{189}	—	October 22, 2003	Kitt Peak	Spacewatch	EOS	2.9 km	MPC · JPL
197097	2003 UX_{189}	—	October 22, 2003	Kitt Peak	Spacewatch	·	6.1 km	MPC · JPL
197098	2003 UU_{190}	—	October 23, 2003	Anderson Mesa	LONEOS	·	4.8 km	MPC · JPL
197099	2003 UZ_{190}	—	October 23, 2003	Anderson Mesa	LONEOS	·	4.6 km	MPC · JPL
197100	2003 UA_{192}	—	October 23, 2003	Anderson Mesa	LONEOS	EOS	3.2 km	MPC · JPL

== 197101–197200 ==
back to top

Designation			Discovery			Properties		Ref
Permanent	Provisional	Named after	Date	Site	Discoverer(s)	Category	Diam.	Ref
197101	2003 UF_{192}	—	October 23, 2003	Anderson Mesa	LONEOS	·	3.4 km	MPC · JPL
197102	2003 UC_{193}	—	October 20, 2003	Kitt Peak	Spacewatch	·	3.4 km	MPC · JPL
197103	2003 UQ_{193}	—	October 20, 2003	Socorro	LINEAR	·	4.8 km	MPC · JPL
197104	2003 UD_{195}	—	October 20, 2003	Kitt Peak	Spacewatch	EOS	3.6 km	MPC · JPL
197105	2003 UW_{195}	—	October 20, 2003	Kitt Peak	Spacewatch	·	4.0 km	MPC · JPL
197106	2003 UK_{198}	—	October 21, 2003	Kitt Peak	Spacewatch	KOR	1.8 km	MPC · JPL
197107	2003 UR_{198}	—	October 21, 2003	Kitt Peak	Spacewatch	·	3.5 km	MPC · JPL
197108	2003 UP_{202}	—	October 21, 2003	Socorro	LINEAR	·	6.4 km	MPC · JPL
197109	2003 UG_{203}	—	October 21, 2003	Kitt Peak	Spacewatch	·	3.0 km	MPC · JPL
197110	2003 UN_{203}	—	October 21, 2003	Kitt Peak	Spacewatch	·	3.0 km	MPC · JPL
197111	2003 UZ_{204}	—	October 22, 2003	Socorro	LINEAR	·	3.4 km	MPC · JPL
197112	2003 UO_{205}	—	October 22, 2003	Haleakala	NEAT	·	2.4 km	MPC · JPL
197113	2003 UU_{205}	—	October 22, 2003	Socorro	LINEAR	TIR	6.4 km	MPC · JPL
197114	2003 UC_{208}	—	October 22, 2003	Kitt Peak	Spacewatch	·	2.1 km	MPC · JPL
197115	2003 UG_{208}	—	October 22, 2003	Kitt Peak	Spacewatch	KOR	2.3 km	MPC · JPL
197116	2003 UB_{209}	—	October 23, 2003	Kitt Peak	Spacewatch	·	4.5 km	MPC · JPL
197117	2003 UO_{209}	—	October 23, 2003	Kitt Peak	Spacewatch	·	5.2 km	MPC · JPL
197118	2003 UU_{209}	—	October 23, 2003	Kitt Peak	Spacewatch	·	2.2 km	MPC · JPL
197119	2003 UR_{211}	—	October 23, 2003	Kitt Peak	Spacewatch	·	4.5 km	MPC · JPL
197120	2003 UQ_{214}	—	October 21, 2003	Anderson Mesa	LONEOS	·	4.2 km	MPC · JPL
197121	2003 UN_{215}	—	October 21, 2003	Kitt Peak	Spacewatch	URS	4.6 km	MPC · JPL
197122	2003 UU_{215}	—	October 21, 2003	Kitt Peak	Spacewatch	·	3.1 km	MPC · JPL
197123	2003 UO_{218}	—	October 21, 2003	Socorro	LINEAR	·	4.6 km	MPC · JPL
197124	2003 UQ_{223}	—	October 22, 2003	Socorro	LINEAR	·	4.8 km	MPC · JPL
197125	2003 UK_{225}	—	October 22, 2003	Kitt Peak	Spacewatch	·	4.1 km	MPC · JPL
197126	2003 UX_{225}	—	October 22, 2003	Kitt Peak	Spacewatch	·	4.4 km	MPC · JPL
197127	2003 UJ_{227}	—	October 23, 2003	Kitt Peak	Spacewatch	·	3.2 km	MPC · JPL
197128	2003 UX_{227}	—	October 23, 2003	Kitt Peak	Spacewatch	·	3.4 km	MPC · JPL
197129	2003 UG_{229}	—	October 23, 2003	Anderson Mesa	LONEOS	·	3.6 km	MPC · JPL
197130	2003 UX_{230}	—	October 24, 2003	Socorro	LINEAR	·	3.8 km	MPC · JPL
197131	2003 UQ_{232}	—	October 24, 2003	Socorro	LINEAR	·	2.5 km	MPC · JPL
197132	2003 UY_{233}	—	October 24, 2003	Socorro	LINEAR	·	4.4 km	MPC · JPL
197133	2003 UF_{235}	—	October 24, 2003	Kitt Peak	Spacewatch	·	3.7 km	MPC · JPL
197134	2003 UK_{237}	—	October 23, 2003	Haleakala	NEAT	·	5.1 km	MPC · JPL
197135	2003 UK_{240}	—	October 24, 2003	Socorro	LINEAR	EOS	2.9 km	MPC · JPL
197136	2003 UZ_{240}	—	October 24, 2003	Kitt Peak	Spacewatch	·	3.9 km	MPC · JPL
197137	2003 UG_{244}	—	October 24, 2003	Socorro	LINEAR	(31811)	4.4 km	MPC · JPL
197138	2003 UY_{246}	—	October 24, 2003	Kitt Peak	Spacewatch	·	2.3 km	MPC · JPL
197139	2003 UB_{247}	—	October 24, 2003	Socorro	LINEAR	·	5.2 km	MPC · JPL
197140	2003 UA_{248}	—	October 25, 2003	Kitt Peak	Spacewatch	·	3.5 km	MPC · JPL
197141	2003 UE_{249}	—	October 25, 2003	Socorro	LINEAR	·	5.1 km	MPC · JPL
197142	2003 UW_{250}	—	October 25, 2003	Socorro	LINEAR	·	3.5 km	MPC · JPL
197143	2003 UG_{251}	—	October 25, 2003	Kitt Peak	Spacewatch	AGN	1.4 km	MPC · JPL
197144	2003 UX_{255}	—	October 25, 2003	Socorro	LINEAR	·	4.3 km	MPC · JPL
197145	2003 US_{256}	—	October 25, 2003	Socorro	LINEAR	·	4.0 km	MPC · JPL
197146	2003 UM_{258}	—	October 25, 2003	Kitt Peak	Spacewatch	·	2.1 km	MPC · JPL
197147	2003 UW_{258}	—	October 25, 2003	Socorro	LINEAR	·	5.5 km	MPC · JPL
197148	2003 UL_{261}	—	October 26, 2003	Catalina	CSS	EOS	6.1 km	MPC · JPL
197149	2003 US_{263}	—	October 27, 2003	Socorro	LINEAR	·	2.6 km	MPC · JPL
197150	2003 US_{265}	—	October 27, 2003	Kitt Peak	Spacewatch	·	8.0 km	MPC · JPL
197151	2003 UU_{266}	—	October 28, 2003	Socorro	LINEAR	·	3.4 km	MPC · JPL
197152	2003 UU_{267}	—	October 28, 2003	Socorro	LINEAR	HYG	5.4 km	MPC · JPL
197153	2003 UE_{271}	—	October 17, 2003	Palomar	NEAT	slow	3.6 km	MPC · JPL
197154	2003 UD_{272}	—	October 28, 2003	Haleakala	NEAT	·	3.1 km	MPC · JPL
197155	2003 UJ_{272}	—	October 29, 2003	Kitt Peak	Spacewatch	TIR	3.9 km	MPC · JPL
197156	2003 UL_{272}	—	October 29, 2003	Kitt Peak	Spacewatch	·	6.2 km	MPC · JPL
197157	2003 UZ_{272}	—	October 29, 2003	Socorro	LINEAR	EOS	3.2 km	MPC · JPL
197158	2003 UF_{273}	—	October 29, 2003	Socorro	LINEAR	·	4.0 km	MPC · JPL
197159	2003 UH_{273}	—	October 29, 2003	Socorro	LINEAR	·	8.4 km	MPC · JPL
197160	2003 UJ_{273}	—	October 29, 2003	Kitt Peak	Spacewatch	·	5.4 km	MPC · JPL
197161	2003 UM_{273}	—	October 29, 2003	Kitt Peak	Spacewatch	NAE	3.2 km	MPC · JPL
197162	2003 UU_{273}	—	October 29, 2003	Kitt Peak	Spacewatch	URS ·	5.3 km	MPC · JPL
197163	2003 UJ_{274}	—	October 30, 2003	Socorro	LINEAR	·	4.7 km	MPC · JPL
197164	2003 UA_{276}	—	October 29, 2003	Catalina	CSS	·	3.4 km	MPC · JPL
197165	2003 UE_{277}	—	October 30, 2003	Haleakala	NEAT	·	5.4 km	MPC · JPL
197166	2003 UG_{277}	—	October 25, 2003	Kitt Peak	Spacewatch	AGN	1.7 km	MPC · JPL
197167	2003 UM_{277}	—	October 25, 2003	Socorro	LINEAR	·	3.7 km	MPC · JPL
197168	2003 UE_{279}	—	October 26, 2003	Kitt Peak	Spacewatch	·	3.5 km	MPC · JPL
197169	2003 UH_{279}	—	October 27, 2003	Kitt Peak	Spacewatch	·	3.1 km	MPC · JPL
197170	2003 UZ_{279}	—	October 27, 2003	Socorro	LINEAR	EMA	6.3 km	MPC · JPL
197171	2003 US_{280}	—	October 28, 2003	Socorro	LINEAR	·	5.0 km	MPC · JPL
197172	2003 UU_{280}	—	October 28, 2003	Socorro	LINEAR	·	2.9 km	MPC · JPL
197173	2003 UW_{280}	—	October 28, 2003	Socorro	LINEAR	·	4.6 km	MPC · JPL
197174	2003 UG_{282}	—	October 29, 2003	Anderson Mesa	LONEOS	HYG	3.9 km	MPC · JPL
197175	2003 UT_{282}	—	October 29, 2003	Anderson Mesa	LONEOS	·	3.6 km	MPC · JPL
197176	2003 UE_{286}	—	October 22, 2003	Kitt Peak	M. W. Buie	·	2.2 km	MPC · JPL
197177	2003 UJ_{287}	—	October 22, 2003	Kitt Peak	M. W. Buie	·	4.4 km	MPC · JPL
197178	2003 UF_{294}	—	October 16, 2003	Kitt Peak	Spacewatch	EOS	3.4 km	MPC · JPL
197179	2003 UM_{296}	—	October 16, 2003	Kitt Peak	Spacewatch	AGN	1.7 km	MPC · JPL
197180	2003 UT_{296}	—	October 16, 2003	Kitt Peak	Spacewatch	·	3.5 km	MPC · JPL
197181	2003 UU_{296}	—	October 16, 2003	Kitt Peak	Spacewatch	HOF	3.4 km	MPC · JPL
197182	2003 UP_{303}	—	October 17, 2003	Kitt Peak	Spacewatch	EOS	3.0 km	MPC · JPL
197183	2003 UO_{309}	—	October 20, 2003	Palomar	NEAT	·	4.9 km	MPC · JPL
197184	2003 UT_{309}	—	October 20, 2003	Socorro	LINEAR	·	4.0 km	MPC · JPL
197185	2003 UV_{309}	—	October 20, 2003	Kitt Peak	Spacewatch	·	3.2 km	MPC · JPL
197186	2003 UN_{310}	—	October 22, 2003	Palomar	NEAT	·	5.2 km	MPC · JPL
197187	2003 UV_{314}	—	October 20, 2003	Kitt Peak	Spacewatch	·	4.8 km	MPC · JPL
197188	2003 UB_{315}	—	October 24, 2003	Socorro	LINEAR	EOS	3.3 km	MPC · JPL
197189 Raymond	2003 UL_{317}	Raymond	October 19, 2003	Apache Point	SDSS	·	3.4 km	MPC · JPL
197190	2003 UF_{318}	—	October 16, 2003	Palomar	NEAT	HOF	2.9 km	MPC · JPL
197191	2003 VE	—	November 3, 2003	Socorro	LINEAR	H	850 m	MPC · JPL
197192 Kazinczy	2003 VK	Kazinczy	November 5, 2003	Piszkéstető	K. Sárneczky, S. Mészáros	EOS	2.9 km	MPC · JPL
197193	2003 VX	—	November 5, 2003	Socorro	LINEAR	·	5.3 km	MPC · JPL
197194	2003 VX_{1}	—	November 2, 2003	Socorro	LINEAR	·	3.9 km	MPC · JPL
197195	2003 VQ_{5}	—	November 15, 2003	Kitt Peak	Spacewatch	·	3.0 km	MPC · JPL
197196 Jamestaylor	2003 VB_{8}	Jamestaylor	November 15, 2003	Junk Bond	D. Healy	·	3.2 km	MPC · JPL
197197	2003 VH_{9}	—	November 15, 2003	Palomar	NEAT	·	4.1 km	MPC · JPL
197198	2003 VV_{9}	—	November 15, 2003	Palomar	NEAT	·	6.7 km	MPC · JPL
197199	2003 VS_{11}	—	November 2, 2003	Socorro	LINEAR	EOS	5.4 km	MPC · JPL
197200 Johnmclaughlin	2003 WJ	Johnmclaughlin	November 16, 2003	Catalina	CSS	·	3.7 km	MPC · JPL

== 197201–197300 ==
back to top

Designation			Discovery			Properties		Ref
Permanent	Provisional	Named after	Date	Site	Discoverer(s)	Category	Diam.	Ref
197201	2003 WL	—	November 16, 2003	Catalina	CSS	·	3.5 km	MPC · JPL
197202	2003 WA_{1}	—	November 16, 2003	Catalina	CSS	·	3.4 km	MPC · JPL
197203	2003 WJ_{1}	—	November 16, 2003	Catalina	CSS	·	6.1 km	MPC · JPL
197204	2003 WY_{1}	—	November 16, 2003	Catalina	CSS	EOS	3.3 km	MPC · JPL
197205	2003 WJ_{3}	—	November 16, 2003	Catalina	CSS	TRE	4.6 km	MPC · JPL
197206	2003 WW_{3}	—	November 16, 2003	Catalina	CSS	·	6.2 km	MPC · JPL
197207	2003 WE_{4}	—	November 16, 2003	Catalina	CSS	·	3.0 km	MPC · JPL
197208	2003 WY_{7}	—	November 18, 2003	Fountain Hills	C. W. Juels, P. R. Holvorcem	·	3.6 km	MPC · JPL
197209	2003 WQ_{8}	—	November 16, 2003	Kitt Peak	Spacewatch	TIR	4.3 km	MPC · JPL
197210	2003 WM_{11}	—	November 18, 2003	Palomar	NEAT	EOS	3.4 km	MPC · JPL
197211	2003 WN_{17}	—	November 18, 2003	Palomar	NEAT	·	3.3 km	MPC · JPL
197212	2003 WT_{18}	—	November 19, 2003	Socorro	LINEAR	·	6.8 km	MPC · JPL
197213	2003 WL_{19}	—	November 19, 2003	Socorro	LINEAR	·	3.6 km	MPC · JPL
197214	2003 WT_{23}	—	November 18, 2003	Kitt Peak	Spacewatch	·	5.8 km	MPC · JPL
197215	2003 WY_{24}	—	November 20, 2003	Socorro	LINEAR	H	900 m	MPC · JPL
197216	2003 WR_{26}	—	November 20, 2003	Nogales	M. Schwartz, P. R. Holvorcem	H	780 m	MPC · JPL
197217	2003 WB_{27}	—	November 16, 2003	Kitt Peak	Spacewatch	·	4.0 km	MPC · JPL
197218	2003 WL_{28}	—	November 16, 2003	Kitt Peak	Spacewatch	EOS	3.1 km	MPC · JPL
197219	2003 WH_{30}	—	November 18, 2003	Kitt Peak	Spacewatch	EOS	2.5 km	MPC · JPL
197220	2003 WY_{31}	—	November 18, 2003	Palomar	NEAT	EOS	2.8 km	MPC · JPL
197221	2003 WR_{32}	—	November 18, 2003	Kitt Peak	Spacewatch	HYG	4.2 km	MPC · JPL
197222	2003 WF_{35}	—	November 19, 2003	Palomar	NEAT	EOS	2.9 km	MPC · JPL
197223	2003 WS_{35}	—	November 19, 2003	Socorro	LINEAR	·	3.0 km	MPC · JPL
197224	2003 WX_{35}	—	November 19, 2003	Catalina	CSS	·	3.6 km	MPC · JPL
197225	2003 WQ_{39}	—	November 19, 2003	Kitt Peak	Spacewatch	·	5.4 km	MPC · JPL
197226	2003 WW_{39}	—	November 19, 2003	Kitt Peak	Spacewatch	·	5.1 km	MPC · JPL
197227	2003 WR_{40}	—	November 19, 2003	Kitt Peak	Spacewatch	·	3.6 km	MPC · JPL
197228	2003 WT_{40}	—	November 19, 2003	Kitt Peak	Spacewatch	·	5.1 km	MPC · JPL
197229	2003 WZ_{42}	—	November 16, 2003	Catalina	CSS	H	730 m	MPC · JPL
197230	2003 WG_{45}	—	November 19, 2003	Palomar	NEAT	EOS	3.3 km	MPC · JPL
197231	2003 WO_{45}	—	November 19, 2003	Palomar	NEAT	·	3.1 km	MPC · JPL
197232	2003 WM_{46}	—	November 18, 2003	Palomar	NEAT	·	3.1 km	MPC · JPL
197233	2003 WD_{50}	—	November 19, 2003	Socorro	LINEAR	·	5.5 km	MPC · JPL
197234	2003 WF_{50}	—	November 19, 2003	Socorro	LINEAR	·	4.6 km	MPC · JPL
197235	2003 WU_{53}	—	November 20, 2003	Socorro	LINEAR	·	2.6 km	MPC · JPL
197236	2003 WA_{57}	—	November 18, 2003	Palomar	NEAT	·	4.5 km	MPC · JPL
197237	2003 WQ_{57}	—	November 18, 2003	Kitt Peak	Spacewatch	·	4.1 km	MPC · JPL
197238	2003 WW_{58}	—	November 18, 2003	Kitt Peak	Spacewatch	·	4.5 km	MPC · JPL
197239	2003 WO_{59}	—	November 18, 2003	Kitt Peak	Spacewatch	·	5.5 km	MPC · JPL
197240	2003 WD_{60}	—	November 18, 2003	Palomar	NEAT	·	2.8 km	MPC · JPL
197241	2003 WO_{60}	—	November 18, 2003	Palomar	NEAT	·	3.7 km	MPC · JPL
197242	2003 WA_{63}	—	November 19, 2003	Kitt Peak	Spacewatch	·	2.6 km	MPC · JPL
197243	2003 WL_{63}	—	November 19, 2003	Kitt Peak	Spacewatch	·	4.6 km	MPC · JPL
197244	2003 WZ_{63}	—	November 19, 2003	Kitt Peak	Spacewatch	VER	5.1 km	MPC · JPL
197245	2003 WJ_{65}	—	November 19, 2003	Kitt Peak	Spacewatch	·	2.2 km	MPC · JPL
197246	2003 WL_{65}	—	November 19, 2003	Kitt Peak	Spacewatch	·	4.5 km	MPC · JPL
197247	2003 WW_{66}	—	November 19, 2003	Kitt Peak	Spacewatch	·	2.8 km	MPC · JPL
197248	2003 WS_{67}	—	November 19, 2003	Kitt Peak	Spacewatch	·	4.1 km	MPC · JPL
197249	2003 WW_{68}	—	November 19, 2003	Kitt Peak	Spacewatch	·	4.3 km	MPC · JPL
197250	2003 WM_{70}	—	November 20, 2003	Kitt Peak	Spacewatch	THM	3.2 km	MPC · JPL
197251	2003 WU_{70}	—	November 20, 2003	Palomar	NEAT	·	4.2 km	MPC · JPL
197252	2003 WN_{71}	—	November 20, 2003	Palomar	NEAT	·	5.6 km	MPC · JPL
197253	2003 WA_{72}	—	November 20, 2003	Socorro	LINEAR	·	4.3 km	MPC · JPL
197254	2003 WB_{72}	—	November 20, 2003	Socorro	LINEAR	·	5.9 km	MPC · JPL
197255	2003 WF_{72}	—	November 20, 2003	Socorro	LINEAR	·	4.7 km	MPC · JPL
197256	2003 WE_{74}	—	November 20, 2003	Socorro	LINEAR	LUT	8.1 km	MPC · JPL
197257	2003 WG_{74}	—	November 20, 2003	Socorro	LINEAR	·	4.9 km	MPC · JPL
197258	2003 WY_{74}	—	November 20, 2003	Socorro	LINEAR	H	940 m	MPC · JPL
197259	2003 WQ_{75}	—	November 19, 2003	Socorro	LINEAR	·	3.4 km	MPC · JPL
197260	2003 WZ_{75}	—	November 19, 2003	Socorro	LINEAR	·	2.8 km	MPC · JPL
197261	2003 WZ_{77}	—	November 20, 2003	Socorro	LINEAR	·	4.2 km	MPC · JPL
197262	2003 WG_{78}	—	November 20, 2003	Socorro	LINEAR	·	3.8 km	MPC · JPL
197263	2003 WU_{78}	—	November 20, 2003	Socorro	LINEAR	·	4.4 km	MPC · JPL
197264	2003 WS_{79}	—	November 20, 2003	Socorro	LINEAR	·	3.8 km	MPC · JPL
197265	2003 WB_{80}	—	November 20, 2003	Socorro	LINEAR	·	6.3 km	MPC · JPL
197266	2003 WM_{88}	—	November 23, 2003	Needville	J. Dellinger	EOS	3.7 km	MPC · JPL
197267	2003 WL_{89}	—	November 16, 2003	Catalina	CSS	EOS	2.8 km	MPC · JPL
197268	2003 WT_{89}	—	November 16, 2003	Kitt Peak	Spacewatch	·	2.8 km	MPC · JPL
197269	2003 WJ_{93}	—	November 19, 2003	Anderson Mesa	LONEOS	·	7.9 km	MPC · JPL
197270	2003 WA_{95}	—	November 19, 2003	Anderson Mesa	LONEOS	·	2.6 km	MPC · JPL
197271	2003 WJ_{95}	—	November 19, 2003	Anderson Mesa	LONEOS	·	4.0 km	MPC · JPL
197272	2003 WB_{96}	—	November 19, 2003	Anderson Mesa	LONEOS	·	4.8 km	MPC · JPL
197273	2003 WQ_{96}	—	November 19, 2003	Anderson Mesa	LONEOS	·	2.0 km	MPC · JPL
197274	2003 WR_{96}	—	November 19, 2003	Anderson Mesa	LONEOS	KOR	2.1 km	MPC · JPL
197275	2003 WQ_{97}	—	November 19, 2003	Anderson Mesa	LONEOS	·	4.6 km	MPC · JPL
197276	2003 WS_{98}	—	November 20, 2003	Palomar	NEAT	LUT	7.6 km	MPC · JPL
197277	2003 WJ_{100}	—	November 20, 2003	Socorro	LINEAR	·	3.9 km	MPC · JPL
197278	2003 WB_{101}	—	November 21, 2003	Catalina	CSS	EUN	2.4 km	MPC · JPL
197279	2003 WD_{102}	—	November 21, 2003	Socorro	LINEAR	·	2.6 km	MPC · JPL
197280	2003 WL_{102}	—	November 21, 2003	Socorro	LINEAR	·	4.5 km	MPC · JPL
197281	2003 WG_{103}	—	November 21, 2003	Socorro	LINEAR	·	3.8 km	MPC · JPL
197282	2003 WP_{104}	—	November 21, 2003	Socorro	LINEAR	·	10 km	MPC · JPL
197283	2003 WR_{106}	—	November 21, 2003	Palomar	NEAT	·	3.3 km	MPC · JPL
197284	2003 WV_{107}	—	November 24, 2003	Junk Bond	D. Healy	·	4.5 km	MPC · JPL
197285	2003 WV_{109}	—	November 20, 2003	Socorro	LINEAR	·	3.3 km	MPC · JPL
197286	2003 WD_{110}	—	November 20, 2003	Socorro	LINEAR	·	4.7 km	MPC · JPL
197287	2003 WR_{113}	—	November 20, 2003	Socorro	LINEAR	·	3.2 km	MPC · JPL
197288	2003 WW_{115}	—	November 20, 2003	Socorro	LINEAR	·	2.7 km	MPC · JPL
197289	2003 WK_{119}	—	November 20, 2003	Socorro	LINEAR	·	3.5 km	MPC · JPL
197290	2003 WP_{119}	—	November 20, 2003	Socorro	LINEAR	·	4.2 km	MPC · JPL
197291	2003 WZ_{119}	—	November 20, 2003	Socorro	LINEAR	·	4.9 km	MPC · JPL
197292	2003 WC_{120}	—	November 20, 2003	Socorro	LINEAR	·	4.8 km	MPC · JPL
197293	2003 WT_{121}	—	November 20, 2003	Socorro	LINEAR	EOS	3.1 km	MPC · JPL
197294	2003 WX_{122}	—	November 20, 2003	Socorro	LINEAR	·	5.6 km	MPC · JPL
197295	2003 WK_{123}	—	November 20, 2003	Socorro	LINEAR	EOS	2.9 km	MPC · JPL
197296	2003 WM_{125}	—	November 20, 2003	Socorro	LINEAR	·	5.4 km	MPC · JPL
197297	2003 WS_{126}	—	November 20, 2003	Socorro	LINEAR	·	3.6 km	MPC · JPL
197298	2003 WC_{128}	—	November 20, 2003	Socorro	LINEAR	·	4.9 km	MPC · JPL
197299	2003 WH_{128}	—	November 21, 2003	Kitt Peak	Spacewatch	slow	3.6 km	MPC · JPL
197300	2003 WN_{128}	—	November 21, 2003	Kitt Peak	Spacewatch	·	3.4 km	MPC · JPL

== 197301–197400 ==
back to top

Designation			Discovery			Properties		Ref
Permanent	Provisional	Named after	Date	Site	Discoverer(s)	Category	Diam.	Ref
197301	2003 WK_{129}	—	November 21, 2003	Socorro	LINEAR	·	3.5 km	MPC · JPL
197302	2003 WY_{129}	—	November 21, 2003	Palomar	NEAT	·	2.8 km	MPC · JPL
197303	2003 WS_{131}	—	November 21, 2003	Palomar	NEAT	·	4.9 km	MPC · JPL
197304	2003 WR_{132}	—	November 21, 2003	Socorro	LINEAR	·	4.0 km	MPC · JPL
197305	2003 WJ_{133}	—	November 21, 2003	Socorro	LINEAR	EOS	2.8 km	MPC · JPL
197306	2003 WD_{138}	—	November 21, 2003	Socorro	LINEAR	·	7.0 km	MPC · JPL
197307	2003 WW_{139}	—	November 21, 2003	Socorro	LINEAR	·	3.9 km	MPC · JPL
197308	2003 WC_{140}	—	November 21, 2003	Socorro	LINEAR	·	6.6 km	MPC · JPL
197309	2003 WS_{140}	—	November 21, 2003	Socorro	LINEAR	slow	4.1 km	MPC · JPL
197310	2003 WG_{141}	—	November 21, 2003	Socorro	LINEAR	H	950 m	MPC · JPL
197311	2003 WJ_{141}	—	November 21, 2003	Socorro	LINEAR	·	4.2 km	MPC · JPL
197312	2003 WB_{142}	—	November 21, 2003	Socorro	LINEAR	·	7.9 km	MPC · JPL
197313	2003 WM_{143}	—	November 19, 2003	Catalina	CSS	·	5.6 km	MPC · JPL
197314	2003 WQ_{143}	—	November 20, 2003	Socorro	LINEAR	VER	5.0 km	MPC · JPL
197315	2003 WE_{144}	—	November 21, 2003	Socorro	LINEAR	·	3.8 km	MPC · JPL
197316	2003 WN_{146}	—	November 23, 2003	Palomar	NEAT	·	6.0 km	MPC · JPL
197317	2003 WW_{146}	—	November 23, 2003	Catalina	CSS	TIR	4.3 km	MPC · JPL
197318	2003 WZ_{146}	—	November 23, 2003	Socorro	LINEAR	·	6.5 km	MPC · JPL
197319	2003 WN_{147}	—	November 23, 2003	Kitt Peak	Spacewatch	·	3.7 km	MPC · JPL
197320	2003 WP_{147}	—	November 23, 2003	Kitt Peak	Spacewatch	·	4.4 km	MPC · JPL
197321	2003 WT_{147}	—	November 23, 2003	Needville	J. Dellinger	·	4.7 km	MPC · JPL
197322	2003 WZ_{148}	—	November 24, 2003	Socorro	LINEAR	EOS	2.3 km	MPC · JPL
197323	2003 WW_{149}	—	November 24, 2003	Anderson Mesa	LONEOS	·	5.7 km	MPC · JPL
197324	2003 WX_{149}	—	November 24, 2003	Nogales	Tenagra II	·	4.5 km	MPC · JPL
197325	2003 WF_{151}	—	November 24, 2003	Palomar	NEAT	T_{j} (2.98) · EUP	6.0 km	MPC · JPL
197326	2003 WP_{152}	—	November 25, 2003	Kingsnake	J. V. McClusky	·	3.3 km	MPC · JPL
197327	2003 WF_{153}	—	November 26, 2003	Anderson Mesa	LONEOS	·	5.4 km	MPC · JPL
197328	2003 WK_{157}	—	November 24, 2003	Palomar	NEAT	·	4.9 km	MPC · JPL
197329	2003 WL_{158}	—	November 28, 2003	Kitt Peak	Spacewatch	KOR	1.7 km	MPC · JPL
197330	2003 WE_{167}	—	November 19, 2003	Kitt Peak	Spacewatch	KOR	1.9 km	MPC · JPL
197331	2003 WN_{168}	—	November 19, 2003	Palomar	NEAT	EOS	2.7 km	MPC · JPL
197332	2003 WM_{169}	—	November 19, 2003	Socorro	LINEAR	H	880 m	MPC · JPL
197333	2003 WD_{170}	—	November 20, 2003	Catalina	CSS	EOS	3.4 km	MPC · JPL
197334	2003 WH_{170}	—	November 20, 2003	Catalina	CSS	·	5.8 km	MPC · JPL
197335	2003 WT_{173}	—	November 18, 2003	Kitt Peak	Spacewatch	·	2.5 km	MPC · JPL
197336	2003 WB_{176}	—	November 19, 2003	Kitt Peak	Spacewatch	·	3.5 km	MPC · JPL
197337	2003 WE_{176}	—	November 19, 2003	Kitt Peak	Spacewatch	·	2.5 km	MPC · JPL
197338	2003 WR_{176}	—	November 19, 2003	Anderson Mesa	LONEOS	·	2.2 km	MPC · JPL
197339	2003 WW_{176}	—	November 19, 2003	Kitt Peak	Spacewatch	·	5.5 km	MPC · JPL
197340	2003 WG_{178}	—	November 20, 2003	Kitt Peak	M. W. Buie	KOR	2.1 km	MPC · JPL
197341	2003 WU_{181}	—	November 21, 2003	Kitt Peak	M. W. Buie	·	5.4 km	MPC · JPL
197342	2003 WG_{192}	—	November 20, 2003	Socorro	LINEAR	·	2.9 km	MPC · JPL
197343	2003 XH_{1}	—	December 1, 2003	Kitt Peak	Spacewatch	EOS	3.3 km	MPC · JPL
197344	2003 XD_{2}	—	December 1, 2003	Socorro	LINEAR	·	2.7 km	MPC · JPL
197345	2003 XK_{4}	—	December 1, 2003	Socorro	LINEAR	·	4.8 km	MPC · JPL
197346	2003 XF_{6}	—	December 3, 2003	Socorro	LINEAR	·	5.3 km	MPC · JPL
197347	2003 XN_{7}	—	December 1, 2003	Socorro	LINEAR	·	3.2 km	MPC · JPL
197348	2003 XV_{7}	—	December 3, 2003	Socorro	LINEAR	·	2.1 km	MPC · JPL
197349	2003 XB_{8}	—	December 4, 2003	Socorro	LINEAR	·	2.7 km	MPC · JPL
197350	2003 XR_{8}	—	December 4, 2003	Socorro	LINEAR	·	8.5 km	MPC · JPL
197351	2003 XT_{8}	—	December 4, 2003	Socorro	LINEAR	·	6.2 km	MPC · JPL
197352	2003 XU_{8}	—	December 4, 2003	Socorro	LINEAR	·	3.9 km	MPC · JPL
197353	2003 XO_{9}	—	December 4, 2003	Socorro	LINEAR	·	5.6 km	MPC · JPL
197354	2003 XM_{10}	—	December 5, 2003	Socorro	LINEAR	T_{j} (2.97)	8.6 km	MPC · JPL
197355	2003 XR_{11}	—	December 10, 2003	Palomar	NEAT	·	4.9 km	MPC · JPL
197356	2003 XS_{11}	—	December 11, 2003	Needville	J. Dellinger, W. G. Dillon	·	5.4 km	MPC · JPL
197357	2003 XH_{12}	—	December 14, 2003	Palomar	NEAT	·	4.1 km	MPC · JPL
197358	2003 XR_{13}	—	December 14, 2003	Palomar	NEAT	EOS	3.5 km	MPC · JPL
197359	2003 XF_{15}	—	December 4, 2003	Socorro	LINEAR	H	900 m	MPC · JPL
197360	2003 XM_{18}	—	December 15, 2003	Palomar	NEAT	EOS	3.1 km	MPC · JPL
197361	2003 XN_{18}	—	December 15, 2003	Palomar	NEAT	EOS	3.8 km	MPC · JPL
197362	2003 XR_{19}	—	December 14, 2003	Kitt Peak	Spacewatch	·	4.4 km	MPC · JPL
197363	2003 XH_{20}	—	December 14, 2003	Kitt Peak	Spacewatch	·	4.7 km	MPC · JPL
197364	2003 XC_{21}	—	December 14, 2003	Kitt Peak	Spacewatch	(159)	6.3 km	MPC · JPL
197365	2003 XF_{21}	—	December 14, 2003	Kitt Peak	Spacewatch	CYB	6.7 km	MPC · JPL
197366	2003 XQ_{21}	—	December 14, 2003	Kitt Peak	Spacewatch	·	3.4 km	MPC · JPL
197367	2003 XF_{22}	—	December 3, 2003	Socorro	LINEAR	·	5.9 km	MPC · JPL
197368	2003 XV_{24}	—	December 1, 2003	Kitt Peak	Spacewatch	·	2.2 km	MPC · JPL
197369	2003 XW_{25}	—	December 1, 2003	Socorro	LINEAR	·	7.4 km	MPC · JPL
197370	2003 XQ_{31}	—	December 1, 2003	Kitt Peak	Spacewatch	·	3.1 km	MPC · JPL
197371	2003 XR_{34}	—	December 1, 2003	Kitt Peak	Spacewatch	·	4.8 km	MPC · JPL
197372	2003 XA_{35}	—	December 3, 2003	Anderson Mesa	LONEOS	MAR	2.1 km	MPC · JPL
197373	2003 XD_{36}	—	December 3, 2003	Socorro	LINEAR	EOS	3.0 km	MPC · JPL
197374	2003 XQ_{36}	—	December 3, 2003	Socorro	LINEAR	EOS	3.3 km	MPC · JPL
197375	2003 XS_{37}	—	December 4, 2003	Socorro	LINEAR	·	3.1 km	MPC · JPL
197376	2003 XB_{39}	—	December 4, 2003	Socorro	LINEAR	·	4.7 km	MPC · JPL
197377	2003 XS_{39}	—	December 5, 2003	Socorro	LINEAR	·	3.6 km	MPC · JPL
197378	2003 XD_{40}	—	December 14, 2003	Kitt Peak	Spacewatch	·	3.5 km	MPC · JPL
197379	2003 XD_{42}	—	December 14, 2003	Kitt Peak	Spacewatch	·	4.6 km	MPC · JPL
197380	2003 YN	—	December 16, 2003	Anderson Mesa	LONEOS	TIR	5.3 km	MPC · JPL
197381	2003 YZ	—	December 17, 2003	Socorro	LINEAR	H	830 m	MPC · JPL
197382	2003 YZ_{2}	—	December 19, 2003	Catalina	CSS	·	4.8 km	MPC · JPL
197383	2003 YC_{3}	—	December 17, 2003	Anderson Mesa	LONEOS	TIR	4.7 km	MPC · JPL
197384	2003 YE_{5}	—	December 16, 2003	Kitt Peak	Spacewatch	·	3.3 km	MPC · JPL
197385	2003 YM_{5}	—	December 16, 2003	Kitt Peak	Spacewatch	·	2.7 km	MPC · JPL
197386	2003 YA_{10}	—	December 17, 2003	Socorro	LINEAR	·	3.7 km	MPC · JPL
197387	2003 YD_{11}	—	December 17, 2003	Socorro	LINEAR	·	3.6 km	MPC · JPL
197388	2003 YN_{11}	—	December 17, 2003	Socorro	LINEAR	·	4.3 km	MPC · JPL
197389	2003 YD_{12}	—	December 17, 2003	Socorro	LINEAR	·	7.7 km	MPC · JPL
197390	2003 YC_{13}	—	December 17, 2003	Anderson Mesa	LONEOS	·	5.9 km	MPC · JPL
197391	2003 YY_{15}	—	December 17, 2003	Anderson Mesa	LONEOS	·	5.2 km	MPC · JPL
197392	2003 YC_{23}	—	December 16, 2003	Anderson Mesa	LONEOS	·	5.0 km	MPC · JPL
197393	2003 YO_{23}	—	December 17, 2003	Socorro	LINEAR	·	3.7 km	MPC · JPL
197394	2003 YQ_{23}	—	December 17, 2003	Socorro	LINEAR	·	5.8 km	MPC · JPL
197395	2003 YC_{25}	—	December 18, 2003	Socorro	LINEAR	EOS	5.1 km	MPC · JPL
197396	2003 YK_{27}	—	December 17, 2003	Črni Vrh	Mikuž, H.	·	5.6 km	MPC · JPL
197397	2003 YU_{28}	—	December 17, 2003	Kitt Peak	Spacewatch	·	5.6 km	MPC · JPL
197398	2003 YU_{29}	—	December 17, 2003	Palomar	NEAT	·	6.5 km	MPC · JPL
197399	2003 YJ_{30}	—	December 18, 2003	Socorro	LINEAR	·	5.4 km	MPC · JPL
197400	2003 YX_{30}	—	December 18, 2003	Socorro	LINEAR	·	5.4 km	MPC · JPL

== 197401–197500 ==
back to top

Designation			Discovery			Properties		Ref
Permanent	Provisional	Named after	Date	Site	Discoverer(s)	Category	Diam.	Ref
197401	2003 YQ_{32}	—	December 19, 2003	Socorro	LINEAR	·	5.7 km	MPC · JPL
197402	2003 YN_{34}	—	December 18, 2003	Socorro	LINEAR	THM	5.0 km	MPC · JPL
197403	2003 YR_{34}	—	December 18, 2003	Socorro	LINEAR	·	2.6 km	MPC · JPL
197404	2003 YO_{35}	—	December 19, 2003	Socorro	LINEAR	HYG	4.1 km	MPC · JPL
197405	2003 YU_{39}	—	December 19, 2003	Kitt Peak	Spacewatch	HYG	5.1 km	MPC · JPL
197406	2003 YO_{42}	—	December 19, 2003	Kitt Peak	Spacewatch	CYB	5.3 km	MPC · JPL
197407	2003 YD_{46}	—	December 17, 2003	Socorro	LINEAR	·	6.0 km	MPC · JPL
197408	2003 YR_{46}	—	December 17, 2003	Kitt Peak	Spacewatch	·	3.4 km	MPC · JPL
197409	2003 YT_{47}	—	December 18, 2003	Socorro	LINEAR	HYG	5.2 km	MPC · JPL
197410	2003 YW_{47}	—	December 18, 2003	Socorro	LINEAR	VER	3.9 km	MPC · JPL
197411	2003 YU_{49}	—	December 18, 2003	Socorro	LINEAR	·	4.3 km	MPC · JPL
197412	2003 YB_{50}	—	December 18, 2003	Socorro	LINEAR	·	4.4 km	MPC · JPL
197413	2003 YD_{50}	—	December 18, 2003	Socorro	LINEAR	·	3.8 km	MPC · JPL
197414	2003 YK_{50}	—	December 18, 2003	Socorro	LINEAR	THM	4.6 km	MPC · JPL
197415	2003 YK_{51}	—	December 18, 2003	Socorro	LINEAR	·	5.0 km	MPC · JPL
197416	2003 YY_{51}	—	December 18, 2003	Socorro	LINEAR	HYG	4.9 km	MPC · JPL
197417	2003 YY_{54}	—	December 19, 2003	Socorro	LINEAR	·	5.6 km	MPC · JPL
197418	2003 YA_{57}	—	December 19, 2003	Socorro	LINEAR	·	4.0 km	MPC · JPL
197419	2003 YB_{60}	—	December 19, 2003	Kitt Peak	Spacewatch	·	4.3 km	MPC · JPL
197420	2003 YG_{63}	—	December 19, 2003	Socorro	LINEAR	·	5.3 km	MPC · JPL
197421	2003 YP_{63}	—	December 19, 2003	Socorro	LINEAR	·	3.1 km	MPC · JPL
197422	2003 YB_{66}	—	December 20, 2003	Socorro	LINEAR	·	4.2 km	MPC · JPL
197423	2003 YS_{67}	—	December 19, 2003	Kitt Peak	Spacewatch	·	3.4 km	MPC · JPL
197424	2003 YE_{69}	—	December 20, 2003	Socorro	LINEAR	·	4.3 km	MPC · JPL
197425	2003 YE_{70}	—	December 21, 2003	Socorro	LINEAR	HYG	5.3 km	MPC · JPL
197426	2003 YY_{70}	—	December 18, 2003	Socorro	LINEAR	slow	5.4 km	MPC · JPL
197427	2003 YG_{72}	—	December 18, 2003	Socorro	LINEAR	·	4.3 km	MPC · JPL
197428	2003 YE_{73}	—	December 18, 2003	Socorro	LINEAR	·	5.4 km	MPC · JPL
197429	2003 YM_{73}	—	December 18, 2003	Socorro	LINEAR	·	6.5 km	MPC · JPL
197430	2003 YE_{78}	—	December 18, 2003	Socorro	LINEAR	·	7.0 km	MPC · JPL
197431	2003 YO_{78}	—	December 18, 2003	Socorro	LINEAR	·	3.0 km	MPC · JPL
197432	2003 YT_{78}	—	December 18, 2003	Socorro	LINEAR	·	7.8 km	MPC · JPL
197433	2003 YA_{80}	—	December 18, 2003	Socorro	LINEAR	·	6.5 km	MPC · JPL
197434	2003 YG_{81}	—	December 18, 2003	Socorro	LINEAR	EOS	3.3 km	MPC · JPL
197435	2003 YS_{81}	—	December 18, 2003	Socorro	LINEAR	·	6.2 km	MPC · JPL
197436	2003 YU_{83}	—	December 19, 2003	Socorro	LINEAR	·	3.0 km	MPC · JPL
197437	2003 YD_{85}	—	December 19, 2003	Socorro	LINEAR	HYG	4.8 km	MPC · JPL
197438	2003 YL_{85}	—	December 19, 2003	Socorro	LINEAR	·	3.7 km	MPC · JPL
197439	2003 YK_{86}	—	December 19, 2003	Socorro	LINEAR	·	4.6 km	MPC · JPL
197440	2003 YJ_{88}	—	December 19, 2003	Socorro	LINEAR	THM	5.9 km	MPC · JPL
197441	2003 YN_{94}	—	December 22, 2003	Socorro	LINEAR	·	5.4 km	MPC · JPL
197442	2003 YV_{94}	—	December 19, 2003	Socorro	LINEAR	VER	5.9 km	MPC · JPL
197443	2003 YK_{96}	—	December 19, 2003	Socorro	LINEAR	(1298)	3.4 km	MPC · JPL
197444	2003 YQ_{102}	—	December 19, 2003	Socorro	LINEAR	·	6.8 km	MPC · JPL
197445	2003 YG_{103}	—	December 19, 2003	Socorro	LINEAR	H	930 m	MPC · JPL
197446	2003 YS_{103}	—	December 21, 2003	Socorro	LINEAR	EOS	3.2 km	MPC · JPL
197447	2003 YE_{104}	—	December 21, 2003	Socorro	LINEAR	HYG	4.5 km	MPC · JPL
197448	2003 YR_{106}	—	December 22, 2003	Kitt Peak	Spacewatch	·	4.8 km	MPC · JPL
197449 Sarahwinfrey	2003 YK_{111}	Sarahwinfrey	December 22, 2003	Goodricke-Pigott	Reddy, V.	·	6.7 km	MPC · JPL
197450	2003 YQ_{114}	—	December 25, 2003	Haleakala	NEAT	·	4.8 km	MPC · JPL
197451	2003 YW_{114}	—	December 25, 2003	Črni Vrh	Mikuž, H.	·	4.2 km	MPC · JPL
197452	2003 YS_{115}	—	December 27, 2003	Socorro	LINEAR	VER	4.9 km	MPC · JPL
197453	2003 YY_{116}	—	December 27, 2003	Socorro	LINEAR	TIR	5.6 km	MPC · JPL
197454	2003 YT_{117}	—	December 17, 2003	Socorro	LINEAR	H	870 m	MPC · JPL
197455	2003 YN_{119}	—	December 27, 2003	Socorro	LINEAR	·	3.5 km	MPC · JPL
197456	2003 YW_{121}	—	December 25, 2003	Kitt Peak	Spacewatch	·	4.4 km	MPC · JPL
197457	2003 YG_{124}	—	December 28, 2003	Kitt Peak	Spacewatch	KOR	2.1 km	MPC · JPL
197458	2003 YS_{125}	—	December 27, 2003	Socorro	LINEAR	·	8.7 km	MPC · JPL
197459	2003 YT_{125}	—	December 27, 2003	Socorro	LINEAR	LIX	5.6 km	MPC · JPL
197460	2003 YO_{126}	—	December 27, 2003	Socorro	LINEAR	·	4.6 km	MPC · JPL
197461	2003 YJ_{127}	—	December 27, 2003	Socorro	LINEAR	·	3.5 km	MPC · JPL
197462	2003 YN_{129}	—	December 27, 2003	Socorro	LINEAR	·	3.0 km	MPC · JPL
197463	2003 YP_{129}	—	December 27, 2003	Socorro	LINEAR	H	850 m	MPC · JPL
197464	2003 YY_{130}	—	December 28, 2003	Socorro	LINEAR	·	4.8 km	MPC · JPL
197465	2003 YQ_{131}	—	December 28, 2003	Socorro	LINEAR	HYG	5.9 km	MPC · JPL
197466	2003 YM_{136}	—	December 17, 2003	Palomar	NEAT	·	4.4 km	MPC · JPL
197467	2003 YL_{139}	—	December 28, 2003	Socorro	LINEAR	·	4.7 km	MPC · JPL
197468	2003 YP_{141}	—	December 28, 2003	Socorro	LINEAR	·	5.6 km	MPC · JPL
197469	2003 YQ_{141}	—	December 28, 2003	Socorro	LINEAR	·	5.0 km	MPC · JPL
197470	2003 YG_{142}	—	December 28, 2003	Socorro	LINEAR	·	4.7 km	MPC · JPL
197471	2003 YO_{144}	—	December 28, 2003	Socorro	LINEAR	·	4.1 km	MPC · JPL
197472	2003 YO_{156}	—	December 16, 2003	Kitt Peak	Spacewatch	·	3.7 km	MPC · JPL
197473	2003 YX_{159}	—	December 17, 2003	Socorro	LINEAR	·	5.0 km	MPC · JPL
197474	2003 YH_{161}	—	December 17, 2003	Socorro	LINEAR	EOS	3.7 km	MPC · JPL
197475	2004 AR_{2}	—	January 13, 2004	Anderson Mesa	LONEOS	·	4.7 km	MPC · JPL
197476	2004 AK_{7}	—	January 13, 2004	Anderson Mesa	LONEOS	·	4.3 km	MPC · JPL
197477	2004 AB_{11}	—	January 3, 2004	Pla D'Arguines	D'Arguines, Pla	·	3.6 km	MPC · JPL
197478	2004 BL_{2}	—	January 16, 2004	Palomar	NEAT	3:2 · SHU	8.2 km	MPC · JPL
197479	2004 BG_{4}	—	January 16, 2004	Palomar	NEAT	H	800 m	MPC · JPL
197480	2004 BE_{8}	—	January 17, 2004	Kitt Peak	Spacewatch	EUN	2.0 km	MPC · JPL
197481	2004 BR_{15}	—	January 17, 2004	Palomar	NEAT	THM	3.5 km	MPC · JPL
197482	2004 BZ_{21}	—	January 19, 2004	Socorro	LINEAR	H	1.1 km	MPC · JPL
197483	2004 BG_{24}	—	January 19, 2004	Anderson Mesa	LONEOS	·	4.2 km	MPC · JPL
197484	2004 BQ_{24}	—	January 19, 2004	Kitt Peak	Spacewatch	·	5.0 km	MPC · JPL
197485	2004 BX_{26}	—	January 19, 2004	Socorro	LINEAR	H	760 m	MPC · JPL
197486	2004 BQ_{29}	—	January 18, 2004	Palomar	NEAT	·	2.7 km	MPC · JPL
197487	2004 BV_{38}	—	January 20, 2004	Socorro	LINEAR	·	3.7 km	MPC · JPL
197488	2004 BL_{45}	—	January 21, 2004	Socorro	LINEAR	·	5.2 km	MPC · JPL
197489	2004 BC_{46}	—	January 21, 2004	Socorro	LINEAR	·	5.2 km	MPC · JPL
197490	2004 BU_{47}	—	January 21, 2004	Socorro	LINEAR	·	4.3 km	MPC · JPL
197491	2004 BA_{58}	—	January 23, 2004	Anderson Mesa	LONEOS	H	1.0 km	MPC · JPL
197492	2004 BW_{60}	—	January 21, 2004	Socorro	LINEAR	·	4.1 km	MPC · JPL
197493	2004 BU_{68}	—	January 27, 2004	Socorro	LINEAR	H	790 m	MPC · JPL
197494	2004 BC_{81}	—	January 26, 2004	Anderson Mesa	LONEOS	·	4.2 km	MPC · JPL
197495	2004 BU_{81}	—	January 26, 2004	Anderson Mesa	LONEOS	·	4.5 km	MPC · JPL
197496	2004 BJ_{83}	—	January 28, 2004	Socorro	LINEAR	·	5.4 km	MPC · JPL
197497	2004 BP_{85}	—	January 28, 2004	Socorro	LINEAR	EUP	8.4 km	MPC · JPL
197498	2004 BU_{85}	—	January 28, 2004	Socorro	LINEAR	H	810 m	MPC · JPL
197499	2004 BB_{87}	—	January 22, 2004	Socorro	LINEAR	H	1.3 km	MPC · JPL
197500	2004 BX_{90}	—	January 24, 2004	Socorro	LINEAR	·	5.0 km	MPC · JPL

== 197501–197600 ==
back to top

Designation			Discovery			Properties		Ref
Permanent	Provisional	Named after	Date	Site	Discoverer(s)	Category	Diam.	Ref
197501	2004 BS_{91}	—	January 25, 2004	Haleakala	NEAT	CYB	6.7 km	MPC · JPL
197502	2004 BA_{96}	—	January 30, 2004	Catalina	CSS	H	760 m	MPC · JPL
197503	2004 BN_{97}	—	January 26, 2004	Anderson Mesa	LONEOS	KOR	2.2 km	MPC · JPL
197504	2004 BS_{117}	—	January 28, 2004	Kitt Peak	Spacewatch	·	3.7 km	MPC · JPL
197505	2004 BG_{120}	—	January 31, 2004	Anderson Mesa	LONEOS	TIR	3.9 km	MPC · JPL
197506	2004 BP_{120}	—	January 31, 2004	Catalina	CSS	·	6.5 km	MPC · JPL
197507	2004 BR_{145}	—	January 21, 2004	Socorro	LINEAR	·	5.3 km	MPC · JPL
197508	2004 BV_{148}	—	January 16, 2004	Kitt Peak	Spacewatch	·	4.5 km	MPC · JPL
197509	2004 BF_{163}	—	January 18, 2004	Kitt Peak	Spacewatch	·	6.0 km	MPC · JPL
197510	2004 CE_{3}	—	February 9, 2004	Anderson Mesa	LONEOS	H	740 m	MPC · JPL
197511	2004 CA_{19}	—	February 11, 2004	Kitt Peak	Spacewatch	THM	3.2 km	MPC · JPL
197512	2004 CN_{28}	—	February 12, 2004	Kitt Peak	Spacewatch	·	3.6 km	MPC · JPL
197513	2004 CF_{36}	—	February 11, 2004	Palomar	NEAT	·	5.7 km	MPC · JPL
197514	2004 CC_{52}	—	February 14, 2004	Socorro	LINEAR	H	810 m	MPC · JPL
197515	2004 CX_{57}	—	February 14, 2004	Socorro	LINEAR	·	3.3 km	MPC · JPL
197516	2004 CG_{89}	—	February 11, 2004	Kitt Peak	Spacewatch	·	4.1 km	MPC · JPL
197517	2004 CU_{103}	—	February 12, 2004	Palomar	NEAT	HYG	3.7 km	MPC · JPL
197518	2004 CJ_{106}	—	February 14, 2004	Palomar	NEAT	·	5.1 km	MPC · JPL
197519	2004 DF_{1}	—	February 17, 2004	Desert Eagle	W. K. Y. Yeung	·	6.0 km	MPC · JPL
197520	2004 DP_{10}	—	February 16, 2004	Kitt Peak	Spacewatch	·	4.1 km	MPC · JPL
197521	2004 DF_{21}	—	February 17, 2004	Catalina	CSS	H	910 m	MPC · JPL
197522	2004 DS_{22}	—	February 18, 2004	Socorro	LINEAR	·	5.7 km	MPC · JPL
197523	2004 DQ_{39}	—	February 23, 2004	Socorro	LINEAR	·	1.5 km	MPC · JPL
197524	2004 DN_{44}	—	February 16, 2004	Kitt Peak	Spacewatch	·	920 m	MPC · JPL
197525 Versteeg	2004 DG_{65}	Versteeg	February 22, 2004	Kitt Peak	M. W. Buie	THM	2.7 km	MPC · JPL
197526	2004 EF_{3}	—	March 10, 2004	Catalina	CSS	·	3.1 km	MPC · JPL
197527	2004 EL_{17}	—	March 12, 2004	Palomar	NEAT	·	5.4 km	MPC · JPL
197528	2004 EM_{19}	—	March 14, 2004	Kitt Peak	Spacewatch	HIL · 3:2	7.0 km	MPC · JPL
197529	2004 EU_{26}	—	March 14, 2004	Kitt Peak	Spacewatch	CYB	4.9 km	MPC · JPL
197530	2004 EH_{32}	—	March 15, 2004	Kitt Peak	Spacewatch	·	1.0 km	MPC · JPL
197531	2004 EL_{45}	—	March 15, 2004	Kitt Peak	Spacewatch	·	750 m	MPC · JPL
197532	2004 ED_{57}	—	March 15, 2004	Palomar	NEAT	H	1.2 km	MPC · JPL
197533	2004 EZ_{59}	—	March 15, 2004	Palomar	NEAT	·	1.3 km	MPC · JPL
197534	2004 EL_{61}	—	March 12, 2004	Palomar	NEAT	·	3.6 km	MPC · JPL
197535	2004 EH_{62}	—	March 12, 2004	Palomar	NEAT	·	880 m	MPC · JPL
197536	2004 EJ_{64}	—	March 14, 2004	Socorro	LINEAR	·	3.9 km	MPC · JPL
197537	2004 EW_{71}	—	March 15, 2004	Kitt Peak	Spacewatch	HIL · 3:2	7.1 km	MPC · JPL
197538	2004 EH_{79}	—	March 15, 2004	Catalina	CSS	·	1.0 km	MPC · JPL
197539	2004 EJ_{83}	—	March 14, 2004	Palomar	NEAT	·	1.4 km	MPC · JPL
197540	2004 EF_{84}	—	March 14, 2004	Palomar	NEAT	·	1.1 km	MPC · JPL
197541	2004 EB_{85}	—	March 15, 2004	Kitt Peak	Spacewatch	·	870 m	MPC · JPL
197542	2004 EU_{97}	—	March 15, 2004	Kitt Peak	Spacewatch	THM	4.6 km	MPC · JPL
197543	2004 FO_{2}	—	March 17, 2004	Socorro	LINEAR	PHO	1.8 km	MPC · JPL
197544	2004 FP_{11}	—	March 16, 2004	Catalina	CSS	EMA	6.3 km	MPC · JPL
197545	2004 FG_{12}	—	March 16, 2004	Catalina	CSS	·	2.9 km	MPC · JPL
197546	2004 FE_{16}	—	March 23, 2004	Kitt Peak	Spacewatch	·	940 m	MPC · JPL
197547	2004 FR_{27}	—	March 17, 2004	Kitt Peak	Spacewatch	·	1.6 km	MPC · JPL
197548	2004 FY_{30}	—	March 29, 2004	Socorro	LINEAR	PHO	1.6 km	MPC · JPL
197549	2004 FW_{36}	—	March 16, 2004	Kitt Peak	Spacewatch	·	1.2 km	MPC · JPL
197550	2004 FS_{46}	—	March 17, 2004	Socorro	LINEAR	·	1.6 km	MPC · JPL
197551	2004 FZ_{57}	—	March 17, 2004	Kitt Peak	Spacewatch	·	860 m	MPC · JPL
197552	2004 FC_{68}	—	March 20, 2004	Socorro	LINEAR	PHO	1.4 km	MPC · JPL
197553	2004 FD_{85}	—	March 18, 2004	Kitt Peak	Spacewatch	·	5.1 km	MPC · JPL
197554	2004 FB_{98}	—	March 23, 2004	Socorro	LINEAR	3:2	9.2 km	MPC · JPL
197555	2004 FR_{107}	—	March 22, 2004	Socorro	LINEAR	·	910 m	MPC · JPL
197556	2004 FY_{115}	—	March 23, 2004	Socorro	LINEAR	·	930 m	MPC · JPL
197557	2004 FC_{116}	—	March 23, 2004	Socorro	LINEAR	·	1.2 km	MPC · JPL
197558	2004 FL_{122}	—	March 26, 2004	Socorro	LINEAR	HIL · 3:2	8.5 km	MPC · JPL
197559	2004 FU_{125}	—	March 27, 2004	Socorro	LINEAR	·	950 m	MPC · JPL
197560	2004 FH_{128}	—	March 27, 2004	Socorro	LINEAR	·	1.1 km	MPC · JPL
197561	2004 FR_{129}	—	March 19, 2004	Socorro	LINEAR	·	1.3 km	MPC · JPL
197562	2004 FO_{140}	—	March 27, 2004	Anderson Mesa	LONEOS	·	1.0 km	MPC · JPL
197563	2004 FH_{148}	—	March 22, 2004	Socorro	LINEAR	L4	20 km	MPC · JPL
197564	2004 GG_{2}	—	April 12, 2004	Siding Spring	SSS	·	1.7 km	MPC · JPL
197565	2004 GG_{9}	—	April 12, 2004	Anderson Mesa	LONEOS	·	1.1 km	MPC · JPL
197566	2004 GC_{11}	—	April 12, 2004	Kitt Peak	Spacewatch	(2076)	1.2 km	MPC · JPL
197567	2004 GN_{12}	—	April 9, 2004	Siding Spring	SSS	·	1.1 km	MPC · JPL
197568	2004 GM_{15}	—	April 14, 2004	Socorro	LINEAR	·	5.5 km	MPC · JPL
197569	2004 GY_{22}	—	April 12, 2004	Anderson Mesa	LONEOS	·	950 m	MPC · JPL
197570	2004 GZ_{29}	—	April 12, 2004	Palomar	NEAT	·	990 m	MPC · JPL
197571	2004 GQ_{30}	—	April 12, 2004	Anderson Mesa	LONEOS	·	1.1 km	MPC · JPL
197572	2004 GF_{33}	—	April 12, 2004	Palomar	NEAT	·	1.2 km	MPC · JPL
197573	2004 GP_{33}	—	April 12, 2004	Kitt Peak	Spacewatch	·	860 m	MPC · JPL
197574	2004 GU_{33}	—	April 12, 2004	Kitt Peak	Spacewatch	·	1.2 km	MPC · JPL
197575	2004 GW_{36}	—	April 13, 2004	Siding Spring	SSS	H	1.2 km	MPC · JPL
197576	2004 GX_{40}	—	April 12, 2004	Kitt Peak	Spacewatch	·	840 m	MPC · JPL
197577	2004 GF_{47}	—	April 12, 2004	Kitt Peak	Spacewatch	THM	3.1 km	MPC · JPL
197578	2004 GX_{79}	—	April 12, 2004	Anderson Mesa	LONEOS	·	890 m	MPC · JPL
197579	2004 HP	—	April 16, 2004	Socorro	LINEAR	·	1.3 km	MPC · JPL
197580	2004 HZ_{1}	—	April 20, 2004	Desert Eagle	W. K. Y. Yeung	·	770 m	MPC · JPL
197581	2004 HQ_{2}	—	April 20, 2004	Socorro	LINEAR	·	1.2 km	MPC · JPL
197582	2004 HP_{4}	—	April 16, 2004	Socorro	LINEAR	·	1.1 km	MPC · JPL
197583	2004 HX_{5}	—	April 17, 2004	Socorro	LINEAR	·	1.2 km	MPC · JPL
197584	2004 HJ_{9}	—	April 17, 2004	Socorro	LINEAR	·	980 m	MPC · JPL
197585	2004 HA_{10}	—	April 17, 2004	Socorro	LINEAR	·	1.3 km	MPC · JPL
197586	2004 HQ_{11}	—	April 19, 2004	Socorro	LINEAR	L4	16 km	MPC · JPL
197587	2004 HR_{11}	—	April 19, 2004	Socorro	LINEAR	NYS	1.2 km	MPC · JPL
197588	2004 HE_{12}	—	April 20, 2004	Kitt Peak	Spacewatch	APO +1km · PHA	1.3 km	MPC · JPL
197589	2004 HC_{20}	—	April 20, 2004	Socorro	LINEAR	·	970 m	MPC · JPL
197590	2004 HT_{30}	—	April 16, 2004	Socorro	LINEAR	·	1.5 km	MPC · JPL
197591	2004 HQ_{36}	—	April 22, 2004	Socorro	LINEAR	·	1.0 km	MPC · JPL
197592	2004 HH_{38}	—	April 23, 2004	Socorro	LINEAR	·	1.4 km	MPC · JPL
197593	2004 HA_{43}	—	April 20, 2004	Socorro	LINEAR	L4	18 km	MPC · JPL
197594	2004 HD_{49}	—	April 22, 2004	Campo Imperatore	CINEOS	·	840 m	MPC · JPL
197595	2004 HH_{60}	—	April 25, 2004	Socorro	LINEAR	·	900 m	MPC · JPL
197596	2004 HV_{61}	—	April 25, 2004	Socorro	LINEAR	·	1.0 km	MPC · JPL
197597	2004 HZ_{61}	—	April 26, 2004	Anderson Mesa	LONEOS	·	1.3 km	MPC · JPL
197598	2004 HR_{62}	—	April 25, 2004	Kitt Peak	Spacewatch	·	1.8 km	MPC · JPL
197599	2004 JY_{2}	—	May 9, 2004	Palomar	NEAT	·	900 m	MPC · JPL
197600	2004 JC_{3}	—	May 9, 2004	Palomar	NEAT	·	830 m	MPC · JPL

== 197601–197700 ==
back to top

Designation			Discovery			Properties		Ref
Permanent	Provisional	Named after	Date	Site	Discoverer(s)	Category	Diam.	Ref
197601	2004 JE_{3}	—	May 9, 2004	Palomar	NEAT	·	740 m	MPC · JPL
197602	2004 JT_{4}	—	May 11, 2004	Anderson Mesa	LONEOS	·	880 m	MPC · JPL
197603	2004 JF_{8}	—	May 10, 2004	Kitt Peak	Spacewatch	·	830 m	MPC · JPL
197604	2004 JS_{14}	—	May 9, 2004	Kitt Peak	Spacewatch	·	1.2 km	MPC · JPL
197605	2004 JH_{15}	—	May 10, 2004	Palomar	NEAT	·	4.0 km	MPC · JPL
197606	2004 JP_{16}	—	May 11, 2004	Anderson Mesa	LONEOS	·	1.8 km	MPC · JPL
197607	2004 JQ_{16}	—	May 11, 2004	Anderson Mesa	LONEOS	·	1.5 km	MPC · JPL
197608	2004 JR_{16}	—	May 11, 2004	Anderson Mesa	LONEOS	·	900 m	MPC · JPL
197609	2004 JY_{16}	—	May 12, 2004	Catalina	CSS	·	1.1 km	MPC · JPL
197610	2004 JR_{18}	—	May 13, 2004	Anderson Mesa	LONEOS	·	1.1 km	MPC · JPL
197611	2004 JJ_{20}	—	May 14, 2004	Socorro	LINEAR	·	1.1 km	MPC · JPL
197612	2004 JM_{20}	—	May 14, 2004	Palomar	NEAT	·	1.0 km	MPC · JPL
197613	2004 JU_{23}	—	May 14, 2004	Kitt Peak	Spacewatch	·	980 m	MPC · JPL
197614	2004 JP_{24}	—	May 15, 2004	Socorro	LINEAR	·	1.2 km	MPC · JPL
197615	2004 JQ_{26}	—	May 15, 2004	Socorro	LINEAR	·	890 m	MPC · JPL
197616	2004 JG_{32}	—	May 14, 2004	Kitt Peak	Spacewatch	·	830 m	MPC · JPL
197617	2004 JD_{34}	—	May 15, 2004	Socorro	LINEAR	·	980 m	MPC · JPL
197618	2004 JK_{34}	—	May 15, 2004	Socorro	LINEAR	·	1.7 km	MPC · JPL
197619	2004 JC_{37}	—	May 13, 2004	Palomar	NEAT	L4	19 km	MPC · JPL
197620	2004 JL_{39}	—	May 14, 2004	Kitt Peak	Spacewatch	L4	18 km	MPC · JPL
197621	2004 JN_{40}	—	May 14, 2004	Kitt Peak	Spacewatch	·	1.0 km	MPC · JPL
197622	2004 JA_{41}	—	May 14, 2004	Palomar	NEAT	·	1.6 km	MPC · JPL
197623	2004 JY_{41}	—	May 15, 2004	Socorro	LINEAR	·	790 m	MPC · JPL
197624	2004 JO_{43}	—	May 9, 2004	Kitt Peak	Spacewatch	L4	10 km	MPC · JPL
197625	2004 JJ_{44}	—	May 12, 2004	Anderson Mesa	LONEOS	·	960 m	MPC · JPL
197626	2004 JM_{45}	—	May 15, 2004	Socorro	LINEAR	·	1.6 km	MPC · JPL
197627	2004 KO	—	May 16, 2004	Socorro	LINEAR	·	840 m	MPC · JPL
197628	2004 KS_{1}	—	May 16, 2004	Kitt Peak	Spacewatch	L4	10 km	MPC · JPL
197629	2004 KH_{3}	—	May 16, 2004	Socorro	LINEAR	·	740 m	MPC · JPL
197630	2004 KJ_{4}	—	May 16, 2004	Siding Spring	SSS	L4	10 km	MPC · JPL
197631	2004 KN_{8}	—	May 18, 2004	Socorro	LINEAR	·	1.1 km	MPC · JPL
197632	2004 KV_{9}	—	May 19, 2004	Socorro	LINEAR	·	1.3 km	MPC · JPL
197633	2004 KD_{10}	—	May 19, 2004	Siding Spring	SSS	·	1.2 km	MPC · JPL
197634	2004 KV_{10}	—	May 18, 2004	Socorro	LINEAR	·	880 m	MPC · JPL
197635	2004 KS_{11}	—	May 20, 2004	Kitt Peak	Spacewatch	·	980 m	MPC · JPL
197636	2004 KU_{16}	—	May 27, 2004	Kitt Peak	Spacewatch	MAS	960 m	MPC · JPL
197637	2004 KB_{18}	—	May 16, 2004	Siding Spring	SSS	·	2.0 km	MPC · JPL
197638	2004 LM	—	June 9, 2004	Socorro	LINEAR	PHO	3.6 km	MPC · JPL
197639	2004 LJ_{2}	—	June 10, 2004	Reedy Creek	J. Broughton	·	2.0 km	MPC · JPL
197640	2004 LE_{8}	—	June 11, 2004	Anderson Mesa	LONEOS	·	1.9 km	MPC · JPL
197641	2004 LG_{8}	—	June 11, 2004	Socorro	LINEAR	·	2.1 km	MPC · JPL
197642	2004 LF_{11}	—	June 10, 2004	Campo Imperatore	CINEOS	·	950 m	MPC · JPL
197643	2004 LO_{11}	—	June 12, 2004	Siding Spring	SSS	·	830 m	MPC · JPL
197644	2004 LD_{22}	—	June 13, 2004	Palomar	NEAT	·	2.0 km	MPC · JPL
197645	2004 LE_{25}	—	June 15, 2004	Socorro	LINEAR	·	1.4 km	MPC · JPL
197646	2004 LK_{25}	—	June 15, 2004	Socorro	LINEAR	·	2.0 km	MPC · JPL
197647	2004 LG_{28}	—	June 14, 2004	Kitt Peak	Spacewatch	·	1.3 km	MPC · JPL
197648	2004 LT_{29}	—	June 14, 2004	Kitt Peak	Spacewatch	·	1.0 km	MPC · JPL
197649	2004 MT	—	June 16, 2004	Socorro	LINEAR	·	1.1 km	MPC · JPL
197650	2004 MH_{1}	—	June 16, 2004	Socorro	LINEAR	·	1.5 km	MPC · JPL
197651	2004 MW_{1}	—	June 17, 2004	Reedy Creek	J. Broughton	·	1.7 km	MPC · JPL
197652	2004 MW_{6}	—	June 25, 2004	Reedy Creek	J. Broughton	NYS	1.4 km	MPC · JPL
197653	2004 MH_{8}	—	June 16, 2004	Siding Spring	SSS	PHO	1.8 km	MPC · JPL
197654	2004 NX	—	July 7, 2004	Campo Imperatore	CINEOS	V	960 m	MPC · JPL
197655	2004 NZ	—	July 7, 2004	Campo Imperatore	CINEOS	·	1.0 km	MPC · JPL
197656	2004 NK_{1}	—	July 9, 2004	Palomar	NEAT	·	1.4 km	MPC · JPL
197657	2004 NL_{1}	—	July 9, 2004	Palomar	NEAT	·	1.9 km	MPC · JPL
197658	2004 NM_{1}	—	July 9, 2004	Palomar	NEAT	·	2.6 km	MPC · JPL
197659	2004 NA_{2}	—	July 9, 2004	Palomar	NEAT	·	1.3 km	MPC · JPL
197660	2004 NE_{2}	—	July 9, 2004	Siding Spring	SSS	NYS	1.9 km	MPC · JPL
197661	2004 NN_{3}	—	July 12, 2004	Reedy Creek	J. Broughton	·	1.6 km	MPC · JPL
197662	2004 NX_{3}	—	July 11, 2004	Socorro	LINEAR	NYS	1.5 km	MPC · JPL
197663	2004 NA_{5}	—	July 9, 2004	Socorro	LINEAR	NYS	1.5 km	MPC · JPL
197664	2004 NR_{5}	—	July 11, 2004	Socorro	LINEAR	·	1.7 km	MPC · JPL
197665	2004 NF_{6}	—	July 11, 2004	Socorro	LINEAR	·	1.5 km	MPC · JPL
197666	2004 NM_{6}	—	July 11, 2004	Socorro	LINEAR	·	2.0 km	MPC · JPL
197667	2004 NK_{10}	—	July 9, 2004	Socorro	LINEAR	·	2.1 km	MPC · JPL
197668	2004 NG_{12}	—	July 11, 2004	Socorro	LINEAR	·	1.7 km	MPC · JPL
197669	2004 NY_{13}	—	July 11, 2004	Socorro	LINEAR	·	1.5 km	MPC · JPL
197670	2004 NL_{14}	—	July 11, 2004	Socorro	LINEAR	·	1.4 km	MPC · JPL
197671	2004 NQ_{14}	—	July 11, 2004	Socorro	LINEAR	·	1.4 km	MPC · JPL
197672	2004 NB_{15}	—	July 11, 2004	Socorro	LINEAR	·	2.0 km	MPC · JPL
197673	2004 NJ_{15}	—	July 11, 2004	Socorro	LINEAR	·	1.3 km	MPC · JPL
197674	2004 NU_{15}	—	July 11, 2004	Socorro	LINEAR	NYS	1.6 km	MPC · JPL
197675	2004 NX_{16}	—	July 11, 2004	Socorro	LINEAR	NYS	1.3 km	MPC · JPL
197676	2004 NM_{20}	—	July 14, 2004	Socorro	LINEAR	·	1.9 km	MPC · JPL
197677	2004 NP_{20}	—	July 14, 2004	Socorro	LINEAR	V	1.0 km	MPC · JPL
197678	2004 NR_{21}	—	July 15, 2004	Socorro	LINEAR	ERI	2.7 km	MPC · JPL
197679	2004 NN_{23}	—	July 14, 2004	Socorro	LINEAR	·	2.8 km	MPC · JPL
197680	2004 NA_{24}	—	July 14, 2004	Socorro	LINEAR	·	2.0 km	MPC · JPL
197681	2004 NL_{24}	—	July 14, 2004	Socorro	LINEAR	·	1.9 km	MPC · JPL
197682	2004 NC_{26}	—	July 11, 2004	Socorro	LINEAR	·	1.4 km	MPC · JPL
197683	2004 NK_{26}	—	July 11, 2004	Socorro	LINEAR	NYS	1.3 km	MPC · JPL
197684	2004 NL_{27}	—	July 11, 2004	Socorro	LINEAR	·	1.6 km	MPC · JPL
197685	2004 NQ_{27}	—	July 11, 2004	Socorro	LINEAR	·	1.9 km	MPC · JPL
197686	2004 NK_{28}	—	July 11, 2004	Socorro	LINEAR	·	880 m	MPC · JPL
197687	2004 NJ_{29}	—	July 14, 2004	Socorro	LINEAR	·	2.0 km	MPC · JPL
197688	2004 NU_{30}	—	July 9, 2004	Anderson Mesa	LONEOS	·	2.1 km	MPC · JPL
197689	2004 NO_{31}	—	July 3, 2004	Anderson Mesa	LONEOS	PHO	2.1 km	MPC · JPL
197690	2004 OE_{2}	—	July 16, 2004	Socorro	LINEAR	NYS	1.5 km	MPC · JPL
197691	2004 OB_{3}	—	July 16, 2004	Socorro	LINEAR	NYS	1.5 km	MPC · JPL
197692	2004 OJ_{3}	—	July 16, 2004	Socorro	LINEAR	·	1.2 km	MPC · JPL
197693	2004 OF_{4}	—	July 17, 2004	Reedy Creek	J. Broughton	·	3.5 km	MPC · JPL
197694	2004 OP_{4}	—	July 16, 2004	Socorro	LINEAR	NYS	1.3 km	MPC · JPL
197695	2004 OV_{4}	—	July 16, 2004	Socorro	LINEAR	·	1.7 km	MPC · JPL
197696	2004 OW_{4}	—	July 16, 2004	Socorro	LINEAR	MAS	1.2 km	MPC · JPL
197697	2004 OC_{5}	—	July 16, 2004	Socorro	LINEAR	·	1.7 km	MPC · JPL
197698	2004 OE_{6}	—	July 16, 2004	Socorro	LINEAR	·	1.8 km	MPC · JPL
197699	2004 ON_{7}	—	July 16, 2004	Socorro	LINEAR	·	2.1 km	MPC · JPL
197700	2004 OV_{7}	—	July 16, 2004	Socorro	LINEAR	·	1.3 km	MPC · JPL

== 197701–197800 ==
back to top

Designation			Discovery			Properties		Ref
Permanent	Provisional	Named after	Date	Site	Discoverer(s)	Category	Diam.	Ref
197701	2004 OS_{8}	—	July 17, 2004	Socorro	LINEAR	·	1.7 km	MPC · JPL
197702	2004 OB_{9}	—	July 19, 2004	Anderson Mesa	LONEOS	NYS	1.7 km	MPC · JPL
197703	2004 OL_{9}	—	July 19, 2004	Reedy Creek	J. Broughton	·	900 m	MPC · JPL
197704	2004 OQ_{9}	—	July 20, 2004	Reedy Creek	J. Broughton	·	2.7 km	MPC · JPL
197705	2004 OV_{11}	—	July 27, 2004	Socorro	LINEAR	·	2.1 km	MPC · JPL
197706	2004 PH	—	August 5, 2004	Palomar	NEAT	·	1.7 km	MPC · JPL
197707 Paulnohr	2004 PN	Paulnohr	August 5, 2004	Palomar	NEAT	·	1.1 km	MPC · JPL
197708 Kalipona	2004 PQ_{1}	Kalipona	August 8, 2004	Needville	J. Dellinger	NYS	1.6 km	MPC · JPL
197709	2004 PE_{2}	—	August 6, 2004	Reedy Creek	J. Broughton	·	1.2 km	MPC · JPL
197710	2004 PU_{2}	—	August 8, 2004	Socorro	LINEAR	·	1.8 km	MPC · JPL
197711	2004 PB_{3}	—	August 3, 2004	Siding Spring	SSS	·	2.0 km	MPC · JPL
197712	2004 PS_{3}	—	August 3, 2004	Siding Spring	SSS	V	1.1 km	MPC · JPL
197713	2004 PZ_{3}	—	August 3, 2004	Siding Spring	SSS	·	1.3 km	MPC · JPL
197714	2004 PR_{4}	—	August 5, 2004	Palomar	NEAT	·	1.8 km	MPC · JPL
197715	2004 PS_{7}	—	August 6, 2004	Palomar	NEAT	·	2.1 km	MPC · JPL
197716	2004 PV_{7}	—	August 6, 2004	Palomar	NEAT	ERI	2.2 km	MPC · JPL
197717	2004 PE_{8}	—	August 6, 2004	Palomar	NEAT	V	970 m	MPC · JPL
197718	2004 PM_{8}	—	August 6, 2004	Palomar	NEAT	NYS	1.6 km	MPC · JPL
197719	2004 PR_{8}	—	August 6, 2004	Palomar	NEAT	·	1.9 km	MPC · JPL
197720	2004 PD_{13}	—	August 7, 2004	Palomar	NEAT	·	1.7 km	MPC · JPL
197721	2004 PB_{14}	—	August 7, 2004	Palomar	NEAT	NYS	1.3 km	MPC · JPL
197722	2004 PG_{14}	—	August 7, 2004	Palomar	NEAT	NYS	1.5 km	MPC · JPL
197723	2004 PE_{15}	—	August 7, 2004	Palomar	NEAT	·	2.2 km	MPC · JPL
197724	2004 PF_{16}	—	August 7, 2004	Palomar	NEAT	·	1.5 km	MPC · JPL
197725	2004 PC_{17}	—	August 8, 2004	Campo Imperatore	CINEOS	·	1.6 km	MPC · JPL
197726	2004 PR_{17}	—	August 8, 2004	Socorro	LINEAR	·	1.1 km	MPC · JPL
197727	2004 PS_{17}	—	August 8, 2004	Socorro	LINEAR	·	2.6 km	MPC · JPL
197728	2004 PH_{19}	—	August 8, 2004	Anderson Mesa	LONEOS	MAS	1.1 km	MPC · JPL
197729	2004 PJ_{19}	—	August 8, 2004	Anderson Mesa	LONEOS	MAS	1.2 km	MPC · JPL
197730	2004 PP_{19}	—	August 8, 2004	Anderson Mesa	LONEOS	·	1.5 km	MPC · JPL
197731	2004 PR_{19}	—	August 8, 2004	Anderson Mesa	LONEOS	·	2.2 km	MPC · JPL
197732	2004 PM_{21}	—	August 7, 2004	Palomar	NEAT	·	1.9 km	MPC · JPL
197733	2004 PJ_{22}	—	August 8, 2004	Socorro	LINEAR	MAS	880 m	MPC · JPL
197734	2004 PR_{23}	—	August 8, 2004	Socorro	LINEAR	MAS	1.0 km	MPC · JPL
197735	2004 PN_{24}	—	August 8, 2004	Socorro	LINEAR	MAS	1.4 km	MPC · JPL
197736	2004 PO_{24}	—	August 8, 2004	Socorro	LINEAR	NYS	1.4 km	MPC · JPL
197737	2004 PQ_{24}	—	August 8, 2004	Socorro	LINEAR	·	1.2 km	MPC · JPL
197738	2004 PR_{24}	—	August 8, 2004	Socorro	LINEAR	·	2.3 km	MPC · JPL
197739	2004 PU_{24}	—	August 8, 2004	Socorro	LINEAR	NYS	1.7 km	MPC · JPL
197740	2004 PC_{25}	—	August 8, 2004	Socorro	LINEAR	·	1.6 km	MPC · JPL
197741	2004 PU_{25}	—	August 8, 2004	Socorro	LINEAR	·	1.6 km	MPC · JPL
197742	2004 PD_{27}	—	August 8, 2004	Reedy Creek	J. Broughton	·	1.7 km	MPC · JPL
197743	2004 PN_{27}	—	August 9, 2004	Reedy Creek	J. Broughton	·	2.2 km	MPC · JPL
197744	2004 PA_{28}	—	August 5, 2004	Palomar	NEAT	·	1.7 km	MPC · JPL
197745	2004 PP_{29}	—	August 7, 2004	Palomar	NEAT	·	1.3 km	MPC · JPL
197746	2004 PN_{30}	—	August 8, 2004	Socorro	LINEAR	V · fast	1.0 km	MPC · JPL
197747	2004 PW_{30}	—	August 8, 2004	Socorro	LINEAR	·	1.2 km	MPC · JPL
197748	2004 PR_{31}	—	August 8, 2004	Socorro	LINEAR	MAS	1.1 km	MPC · JPL
197749	2004 PW_{31}	—	August 8, 2004	Socorro	LINEAR	·	2.3 km	MPC · JPL
197750	2004 PY_{31}	—	August 8, 2004	Socorro	LINEAR	·	2.0 km	MPC · JPL
197751	2004 PK_{32}	—	August 8, 2004	Socorro	LINEAR	·	1.8 km	MPC · JPL
197752	2004 PE_{33}	—	August 8, 2004	Socorro	LINEAR	MAS	1.0 km	MPC · JPL
197753	2004 PM_{33}	—	August 8, 2004	Socorro	LINEAR	·	1.6 km	MPC · JPL
197754	2004 PX_{33}	—	August 8, 2004	Anderson Mesa	LONEOS	MAS	870 m	MPC · JPL
197755	2004 PY_{33}	—	August 8, 2004	Anderson Mesa	LONEOS	ERI	2.7 km	MPC · JPL
197756	2004 PJ_{34}	—	August 8, 2004	Anderson Mesa	LONEOS	·	1.5 km	MPC · JPL
197757	2004 PL_{34}	—	August 8, 2004	Anderson Mesa	LONEOS	·	1.7 km	MPC · JPL
197758	2004 PO_{34}	—	August 8, 2004	Anderson Mesa	LONEOS	·	1.9 km	MPC · JPL
197759	2004 PU_{34}	—	August 8, 2004	Anderson Mesa	LONEOS	·	1.4 km	MPC · JPL
197760	2004 PV_{34}	—	August 8, 2004	Anderson Mesa	LONEOS	MAS	1.1 km	MPC · JPL
197761	2004 PC_{35}	—	August 8, 2004	Anderson Mesa	LONEOS	NYS	1.6 km	MPC · JPL
197762	2004 PG_{35}	—	August 8, 2004	Anderson Mesa	LONEOS	·	1.9 km	MPC · JPL
197763	2004 PK_{35}	—	August 8, 2004	Anderson Mesa	LONEOS	·	1.6 km	MPC · JPL
197764	2004 PP_{35}	—	August 8, 2004	Anderson Mesa	LONEOS	·	1.6 km	MPC · JPL
197765	2004 PB_{38}	—	August 9, 2004	Socorro	LINEAR	·	1.8 km	MPC · JPL
197766	2004 PE_{38}	—	August 9, 2004	Socorro	LINEAR	·	2.0 km	MPC · JPL
197767	2004 PD_{39}	—	August 9, 2004	Anderson Mesa	LONEOS	·	1.0 km	MPC · JPL
197768	2004 PT_{39}	—	August 9, 2004	Anderson Mesa	LONEOS	·	1.8 km	MPC · JPL
197769	2004 PX_{39}	—	August 9, 2004	Socorro	LINEAR	·	1.3 km	MPC · JPL
197770	2004 PG_{40}	—	August 9, 2004	Socorro	LINEAR	·	2.2 km	MPC · JPL
197771	2004 PE_{42}	—	August 9, 2004	Socorro	LINEAR	·	1.5 km	MPC · JPL
197772	2004 PG_{45}	—	August 7, 2004	Palomar	NEAT	·	1.3 km	MPC · JPL
197773	2004 PJ_{45}	—	August 7, 2004	Palomar	NEAT	NYS	1.9 km	MPC · JPL
197774	2004 PN_{45}	—	August 7, 2004	Palomar	NEAT	·	1.9 km	MPC · JPL
197775	2004 PR_{45}	—	August 7, 2004	Palomar	NEAT	·	1.7 km	MPC · JPL
197776	2004 PS_{45}	—	August 7, 2004	Palomar	NEAT	·	1.5 km	MPC · JPL
197777	2004 PW_{45}	—	August 7, 2004	Siding Spring	SSS	·	1.1 km	MPC · JPL
197778	2004 PJ_{46}	—	August 7, 2004	Campo Imperatore	CINEOS	·	1.2 km	MPC · JPL
197779	2004 PO_{46}	—	August 7, 2004	Campo Imperatore	CINEOS	·	1.3 km	MPC · JPL
197780	2004 PW_{46}	—	August 8, 2004	Campo Imperatore	CINEOS	·	1.7 km	MPC · JPL
197781	2004 PZ_{47}	—	August 8, 2004	Socorro	LINEAR	·	1.8 km	MPC · JPL
197782	2004 PA_{48}	—	August 8, 2004	Socorro	LINEAR	·	1.5 km	MPC · JPL
197783	2004 PR_{48}	—	August 8, 2004	Socorro	LINEAR	·	2.1 km	MPC · JPL
197784	2004 PA_{50}	—	August 8, 2004	Socorro	LINEAR	·	1.3 km	MPC · JPL
197785	2004 PK_{50}	—	August 8, 2004	Socorro	LINEAR	·	1.9 km	MPC · JPL
197786	2004 PU_{50}	—	August 8, 2004	Socorro	LINEAR	·	1.6 km	MPC · JPL
197787	2004 PN_{51}	—	August 8, 2004	Socorro	LINEAR	·	1.7 km	MPC · JPL
197788	2004 PR_{51}	—	August 8, 2004	Socorro	LINEAR	·	2.0 km	MPC · JPL
197789	2004 PN_{52}	—	August 8, 2004	Socorro	LINEAR	·	1.5 km	MPC · JPL
197790	2004 PP_{54}	—	August 8, 2004	Anderson Mesa	LONEOS	·	2.1 km	MPC · JPL
197791	2004 PP_{55}	—	August 8, 2004	Anderson Mesa	LONEOS	V	1.1 km	MPC · JPL
197792	2004 PQ_{57}	—	August 9, 2004	Socorro	LINEAR	·	3.6 km	MPC · JPL
197793	2004 PB_{58}	—	August 9, 2004	Socorro	LINEAR	·	1.7 km	MPC · JPL
197794	2004 PK_{58}	—	August 9, 2004	Socorro	LINEAR	V	1.1 km	MPC · JPL
197795	2004 PG_{60}	—	August 9, 2004	Anderson Mesa	LONEOS	·	2.0 km	MPC · JPL
197796	2004 PJ_{60}	—	August 9, 2004	Anderson Mesa	LONEOS	NYS	1.7 km	MPC · JPL
197797	2004 PA_{61}	—	August 9, 2004	Anderson Mesa	LONEOS	·	1.6 km	MPC · JPL
197798	2004 PX_{61}	—	August 9, 2004	Socorro	LINEAR	·	2.4 km	MPC · JPL
197799	2004 PD_{63}	—	August 10, 2004	Socorro	LINEAR	·	1.7 km	MPC · JPL
197800	2004 PU_{64}	—	August 10, 2004	Socorro	LINEAR	·	1.7 km	MPC · JPL

== 197801–197900 ==
back to top

Designation			Discovery			Properties		Ref
Permanent	Provisional	Named after	Date	Site	Discoverer(s)	Category	Diam.	Ref
197801	2004 PR_{65}	—	August 10, 2004	Siding Spring	SSS	·	1.1 km	MPC · JPL
197802	2004 PG_{66}	—	August 10, 2004	Socorro	LINEAR	MAS	1.1 km	MPC · JPL
197803	2004 PH_{67}	—	August 5, 2004	Palomar	NEAT	·	1.2 km	MPC · JPL
197804	2004 PB_{68}	—	August 6, 2004	Palomar	NEAT	·	1.3 km	MPC · JPL
197805	2004 PY_{68}	—	August 7, 2004	Palomar	NEAT	NYS	1.5 km	MPC · JPL
197806	2004 PZ_{68}	—	August 7, 2004	Palomar	NEAT	·	1.6 km	MPC · JPL
197807	2004 PH_{69}	—	August 7, 2004	Palomar	NEAT	·	1.5 km	MPC · JPL
197808	2004 PN_{70}	—	August 8, 2004	Campo Imperatore	CINEOS	MAS	940 m	MPC · JPL
197809	2004 PU_{71}	—	August 8, 2004	Socorro	LINEAR	MAS	950 m	MPC · JPL
197810	2004 PX_{72}	—	August 8, 2004	Socorro	LINEAR	MAS	930 m	MPC · JPL
197811	2004 PN_{73}	—	August 8, 2004	Socorro	LINEAR	·	2.8 km	MPC · JPL
197812	2004 PR_{73}	—	August 8, 2004	Socorro	LINEAR	·	1.3 km	MPC · JPL
197813	2004 PK_{74}	—	August 8, 2004	Socorro	LINEAR	·	1.8 km	MPC · JPL
197814	2004 PQ_{74}	—	August 8, 2004	Socorro	LINEAR	·	1.6 km	MPC · JPL
197815	2004 PJ_{75}	—	August 8, 2004	Anderson Mesa	LONEOS	·	1.7 km	MPC · JPL
197816	2004 PO_{76}	—	August 9, 2004	Anderson Mesa	LONEOS	·	1.3 km	MPC · JPL
197817	2004 PW_{77}	—	August 9, 2004	Socorro	LINEAR	·	1.7 km	MPC · JPL
197818	2004 PX_{77}	—	August 9, 2004	Socorro	LINEAR	·	1.7 km	MPC · JPL
197819	2004 PZ_{78}	—	August 9, 2004	Socorro	LINEAR	·	1.4 km	MPC · JPL
197820	2004 PE_{79}	—	August 9, 2004	Socorro	LINEAR	·	2.0 km	MPC · JPL
197821	2004 PZ_{79}	—	August 9, 2004	Anderson Mesa	LONEOS	NYS	1.7 km	MPC · JPL
197822	2004 PN_{80}	—	August 9, 2004	Socorro	LINEAR	·	2.2 km	MPC · JPL
197823	2004 PD_{81}	—	August 10, 2004	Socorro	LINEAR	·	1.3 km	MPC · JPL
197824	2004 PU_{81}	—	August 10, 2004	Socorro	LINEAR	·	2.0 km	MPC · JPL
197825	2004 PL_{82}	—	August 10, 2004	Socorro	LINEAR	MAS	850 m	MPC · JPL
197826	2004 PL_{84}	—	August 10, 2004	Socorro	LINEAR	·	4.5 km	MPC · JPL
197827	2004 PT_{88}	—	August 8, 2004	Palomar	NEAT	·	1.2 km	MPC · JPL
197828	2004 PE_{91}	—	August 11, 2004	Socorro	LINEAR	NYS	1.3 km	MPC · JPL
197829	2004 PT_{91}	—	August 12, 2004	Socorro	LINEAR	·	1.9 km	MPC · JPL
197830	2004 PC_{92}	—	August 12, 2004	Socorro	LINEAR	fast	1.6 km	MPC · JPL
197831	2004 PV_{94}	—	August 10, 2004	Campo Imperatore	CINEOS	NYS	1.5 km	MPC · JPL
197832	2004 PW_{94}	—	August 11, 2004	Socorro	LINEAR	·	1.3 km	MPC · JPL
197833	2004 PN_{95}	—	August 12, 2004	Socorro	LINEAR	·	1.4 km	MPC · JPL
197834	2004 PR_{95}	—	August 13, 2004	Reedy Creek	J. Broughton	PHO	1.6 km	MPC · JPL
197835	2004 PZ_{95}	—	August 10, 2004	Socorro	LINEAR	NYS	1.5 km	MPC · JPL
197836	2004 PL_{96}	—	August 11, 2004	Socorro	LINEAR	NYS	1.6 km	MPC · JPL
197837	2004 PW_{98}	—	August 8, 2004	Socorro	LINEAR	·	1.9 km	MPC · JPL
197838	2004 PF_{99}	—	August 9, 2004	Socorro	LINEAR	·	2.6 km	MPC · JPL
197839	2004 PN_{99}	—	August 10, 2004	Palomar	NEAT	·	4.3 km	MPC · JPL
197840	2004 PY_{100}	—	August 11, 2004	Socorro	LINEAR	NYS	2.0 km	MPC · JPL
197841	2004 PL_{104}	—	August 13, 2004	Palomar	NEAT	·	1.2 km	MPC · JPL
197842	2004 PH_{107}	—	August 15, 2004	Palomar	NEAT	·	2.1 km	MPC · JPL
197843	2004 PK_{109}	—	August 12, 2004	Campo Imperatore	CINEOS	·	2.3 km	MPC · JPL
197844	2004 PJ_{110}	—	August 12, 2004	Socorro	LINEAR	·	1.5 km	MPC · JPL
197845 Michaelvincent	2004 PU_{110}	Michaelvincent	August 14, 2004	Cerro Tololo	M. W. Buie	·	1.5 km	MPC · JPL
197846	2004 PU_{112}	—	August 8, 2004	Palomar	NEAT	·	1.9 km	MPC · JPL
197847	2004 QJ_{2}	—	August 19, 2004	Reedy Creek	J. Broughton	·	1.9 km	MPC · JPL
197848	2004 QQ_{2}	—	August 20, 2004	Kitt Peak	Spacewatch	·	1.3 km	MPC · JPL
197849	2004 QG_{3}	—	August 20, 2004	Reedy Creek	J. Broughton	·	1.9 km	MPC · JPL
197850	2004 QL_{3}	—	August 21, 2004	Reedy Creek	J. Broughton	PHO	1.8 km	MPC · JPL
197851	2004 QB_{5}	—	August 21, 2004	Reedy Creek	J. Broughton	V	1.2 km	MPC · JPL
197852	2004 QZ_{6}	—	August 21, 2004	Reedy Creek	J. Broughton	·	1.5 km	MPC · JPL
197853	2004 QA_{7}	—	August 22, 2004	Reedy Creek	J. Broughton	·	1.6 km	MPC · JPL
197854	2004 QZ_{10}	—	August 21, 2004	Siding Spring	SSS	·	2.0 km	MPC · JPL
197855	2004 QK_{11}	—	August 21, 2004	Siding Spring	SSS	·	2.1 km	MPC · JPL
197856 Tafelmusik	2004 QH_{16}	Tafelmusik	August 21, 2004	Mauna Kea	D. D. Balam	·	1.8 km	MPC · JPL
197857	2004 QX_{18}	—	August 21, 2004	Catalina	CSS	NYS	1.6 km	MPC · JPL
197858	2004 QT_{19}	—	August 25, 2004	Kitt Peak	Spacewatch	·	2.2 km	MPC · JPL
197859	2004 QH_{22}	—	August 25, 2004	Socorro	LINEAR	PHO	3.2 km	MPC · JPL
197860	2004 QO_{25}	—	August 26, 2004	Anderson Mesa	LONEOS	HNS	2.6 km	MPC · JPL
197861	2004 QS_{25}	—	August 26, 2004	Siding Spring	SSS	·	1.8 km	MPC · JPL
197862	2004 RB_{1}	—	September 4, 2004	Needville	J. Dellinger, A. Lowe	·	1.6 km	MPC · JPL
197863	2004 RF_{1}	—	September 3, 2004	Palomar	NEAT	·	2.5 km	MPC · JPL
197864 Florentpagny	2004 RQ_{1}	Florentpagny	September 5, 2004	Vicques	M. Ory	·	2.8 km	MPC · JPL
197865	2004 RU_{4}	—	September 4, 2004	Palomar	NEAT	·	2.0 km	MPC · JPL
197866	2004 RM_{5}	—	September 4, 2004	Palomar	NEAT	V	950 m	MPC · JPL
197867	2004 RS_{5}	—	September 4, 2004	Palomar	NEAT	V	910 m	MPC · JPL
197868	2004 RQ_{6}	—	September 5, 2004	Palomar	NEAT	·	2.2 km	MPC · JPL
197869	2004 RZ_{7}	—	September 6, 2004	Saint-Véran	St. Veran	·	4.1 km	MPC · JPL
197870 Erkman	2004 RC_{8}	Erkman	September 6, 2004	Vicques	M. Ory	EUN	1.8 km	MPC · JPL
197871	2004 RD_{8}	—	September 6, 2004	Kleť	M. Tichý	·	1.3 km	MPC · JPL
197872	2004 RK_{8}	—	September 6, 2004	Ottmarsheim	C. Rinner	·	2.0 km	MPC · JPL
197873	2004 RB_{9}	—	September 6, 2004	Goodricke-Pigott	Goodricke-Pigott	·	1.6 km	MPC · JPL
197874	2004 RG_{11}	—	September 6, 2004	Siding Spring	SSS	·	2.0 km	MPC · JPL
197875	2004 RN_{13}	—	September 6, 2004	Needville	Needville	NYS	1.3 km	MPC · JPL
197876	2004 RT_{13}	—	September 6, 2004	Needville	Needville	MAS	840 m	MPC · JPL
197877	2004 RF_{14}	—	September 6, 2004	Siding Spring	SSS	·	1.2 km	MPC · JPL
197878	2004 RJ_{14}	—	September 6, 2004	Siding Spring	SSS	KON	4.2 km	MPC · JPL
197879	2004 RD_{15}	—	September 6, 2004	Siding Spring	SSS	·	1.5 km	MPC · JPL
197880	2004 RU_{15}	—	September 7, 2004	Socorro	LINEAR	MAS	900 m	MPC · JPL
197881	2004 RY_{15}	—	September 7, 2004	Socorro	LINEAR	NYS	1.4 km	MPC · JPL
197882	2004 RL_{16}	—	September 7, 2004	Socorro	LINEAR	NYS	1.7 km	MPC · JPL
197883	2004 RO_{16}	—	September 7, 2004	Socorro	LINEAR	·	1.4 km	MPC · JPL
197884	2004 RL_{21}	—	September 7, 2004	Kitt Peak	Spacewatch	·	1.6 km	MPC · JPL
197885	2004 RX_{21}	—	September 7, 2004	Kitt Peak	Spacewatch	MAS	980 m	MPC · JPL
197886	2004 RB_{22}	—	September 7, 2004	Kitt Peak	Spacewatch	MAS	850 m	MPC · JPL
197887	2004 RQ_{22}	—	September 7, 2004	Kitt Peak	Spacewatch	·	1.5 km	MPC · JPL
197888	2004 RR_{22}	—	September 7, 2004	Kitt Peak	Spacewatch	·	1.5 km	MPC · JPL
197889	2004 RV_{22}	—	September 7, 2004	Kitt Peak	Spacewatch	·	1.4 km	MPC · JPL
197890	2004 RB_{23}	—	September 7, 2004	Kitt Peak	Spacewatch	·	1.5 km	MPC · JPL
197891	2004 RR_{23}	—	September 8, 2004	Uccle	T. Pauwels	NYS	1.8 km	MPC · JPL
197892	2004 RD_{25}	—	September 8, 2004	Drebach	J. Kandler	·	2.0 km	MPC · JPL
197893	2004 RZ_{29}	—	September 7, 2004	Socorro	LINEAR	NYS	1.7 km	MPC · JPL
197894	2004 RJ_{30}	—	September 7, 2004	Socorro	LINEAR	·	1.5 km	MPC · JPL
197895	2004 RS_{30}	—	September 7, 2004	Socorro	LINEAR	·	1.2 km	MPC · JPL
197896	2004 RO_{31}	—	September 7, 2004	Socorro	LINEAR	·	1.7 km	MPC · JPL
197897	2004 RR_{31}	—	September 7, 2004	Socorro	LINEAR	·	2.0 km	MPC · JPL
197898	2004 RS_{32}	—	September 7, 2004	Socorro	LINEAR	·	2.1 km	MPC · JPL
197899	2004 RV_{32}	—	September 7, 2004	Socorro	LINEAR	NYS	1.5 km	MPC · JPL
197900	2004 RH_{36}	—	September 7, 2004	Socorro	LINEAR	·	960 m	MPC · JPL

== 197901–198000 ==
back to top

Designation			Discovery			Properties		Ref
Permanent	Provisional	Named after	Date	Site	Discoverer(s)	Category	Diam.	Ref
197901	2004 RK_{38}	—	September 7, 2004	Socorro	LINEAR	·	1.6 km	MPC · JPL
197902	2004 RL_{38}	—	September 7, 2004	Socorro	LINEAR	·	2.0 km	MPC · JPL
197903	2004 RL_{39}	—	September 7, 2004	Kitt Peak	Spacewatch	·	1.1 km	MPC · JPL
197904	2004 RM_{39}	—	September 7, 2004	Kitt Peak	Spacewatch	·	2.4 km	MPC · JPL
197905	2004 RY_{41}	—	September 7, 2004	Kitt Peak	Spacewatch	·	1.9 km	MPC · JPL
197906	2004 RB_{42}	—	September 7, 2004	Kitt Peak	Spacewatch	·	2.4 km	MPC · JPL
197907	2004 RD_{42}	—	September 7, 2004	Kitt Peak	Spacewatch	·	2.3 km	MPC · JPL
197908	2004 RC_{43}	—	September 8, 2004	Socorro	LINEAR	NYS	1.5 km	MPC · JPL
197909	2004 RH_{43}	—	September 8, 2004	Socorro	LINEAR	NYS	1.3 km	MPC · JPL
197910	2004 RG_{45}	—	September 8, 2004	Socorro	LINEAR	V	1.1 km	MPC · JPL
197911	2004 RK_{46}	—	September 8, 2004	Socorro	LINEAR	MAS	960 m	MPC · JPL
197912	2004 RQ_{46}	—	September 8, 2004	Socorro	LINEAR	·	1.1 km	MPC · JPL
197913	2004 RT_{47}	—	September 8, 2004	Socorro	LINEAR	NYS	1.4 km	MPC · JPL
197914	2004 RP_{48}	—	September 8, 2004	Socorro	LINEAR	·	1.4 km	MPC · JPL
197915	2004 RK_{49}	—	September 8, 2004	Socorro	LINEAR	NYS	1.6 km	MPC · JPL
197916	2004 RU_{49}	—	September 8, 2004	Socorro	LINEAR	PHO	1.3 km	MPC · JPL
197917	2004 RB_{51}	—	September 8, 2004	Socorro	LINEAR	·	1.4 km	MPC · JPL
197918	2004 RO_{51}	—	September 8, 2004	Socorro	LINEAR	·	1.4 km	MPC · JPL
197919	2004 RZ_{51}	—	September 8, 2004	Socorro	LINEAR	·	2.1 km	MPC · JPL
197920	2004 RL_{52}	—	September 8, 2004	Socorro	LINEAR	·	1.6 km	MPC · JPL
197921	2004 RQ_{53}	—	September 8, 2004	Socorro	LINEAR	·	2.7 km	MPC · JPL
197922	2004 RA_{54}	—	September 8, 2004	Socorro	LINEAR	·	1.4 km	MPC · JPL
197923	2004 RO_{54}	—	September 8, 2004	Socorro	LINEAR	·	1.1 km	MPC · JPL
197924	2004 RQ_{54}	—	September 8, 2004	Socorro	LINEAR	·	1.8 km	MPC · JPL
197925	2004 RK_{56}	—	September 8, 2004	Socorro	LINEAR	·	1.6 km	MPC · JPL
197926	2004 RZ_{57}	—	September 8, 2004	Socorro	LINEAR	·	3.1 km	MPC · JPL
197927	2004 RW_{59}	—	September 8, 2004	Socorro	LINEAR	·	1.9 km	MPC · JPL
197928	2004 RE_{60}	—	September 8, 2004	Socorro	LINEAR	·	1.6 km	MPC · JPL
197929	2004 RN_{60}	—	September 8, 2004	Socorro	LINEAR	NYS	1.1 km	MPC · JPL
197930	2004 RJ_{61}	—	September 8, 2004	Socorro	LINEAR	·	2.0 km	MPC · JPL
197931	2004 RQ_{62}	—	September 8, 2004	Socorro	LINEAR	·	1.6 km	MPC · JPL
197932	2004 RV_{64}	—	September 8, 2004	Socorro	LINEAR	·	1.5 km	MPC · JPL
197933	2004 RV_{66}	—	September 8, 2004	Socorro	LINEAR	·	1.4 km	MPC · JPL
197934	2004 RC_{67}	—	September 8, 2004	Socorro	LINEAR	MAS	940 m	MPC · JPL
197935	2004 RW_{67}	—	September 8, 2004	Socorro	LINEAR	·	1.8 km	MPC · JPL
197936	2004 RK_{68}	—	September 8, 2004	Socorro	LINEAR	·	2.0 km	MPC · JPL
197937	2004 RG_{69}	—	September 8, 2004	Socorro	LINEAR	·	1.6 km	MPC · JPL
197938	2004 RF_{70}	—	September 8, 2004	Socorro	LINEAR	·	2.0 km	MPC · JPL
197939	2004 RR_{70}	—	September 8, 2004	Socorro	LINEAR	·	1.6 km	MPC · JPL
197940	2004 RT_{70}	—	September 8, 2004	Socorro	LINEAR	NYS	1.5 km	MPC · JPL
197941	2004 RH_{71}	—	September 8, 2004	Socorro	LINEAR	·	1.8 km	MPC · JPL
197942	2004 RD_{72}	—	September 8, 2004	Socorro	LINEAR	PHO	2.0 km	MPC · JPL
197943	2004 RO_{72}	—	September 8, 2004	Socorro	LINEAR	·	2.2 km	MPC · JPL
197944	2004 RA_{74}	—	September 8, 2004	Socorro	LINEAR	·	1.7 km	MPC · JPL
197945	2004 RE_{74}	—	September 8, 2004	Socorro	LINEAR	·	2.1 km	MPC · JPL
197946	2004 RY_{75}	—	September 8, 2004	Socorro	LINEAR	·	1.9 km	MPC · JPL
197947	2004 RZ_{80}	—	September 8, 2004	Socorro	LINEAR	·	2.7 km	MPC · JPL
197948	2004 RX_{81}	—	September 8, 2004	Palomar	NEAT	NYS	1.7 km	MPC · JPL
197949	2004 RC_{82}	—	September 9, 2004	Socorro	LINEAR	MAS	990 m	MPC · JPL
197950	2004 RC_{83}	—	September 9, 2004	Socorro	LINEAR	NYS	1.7 km	MPC · JPL
197951	2004 RR_{83}	—	September 9, 2004	Kitt Peak	Spacewatch	·	1.4 km	MPC · JPL
197952	2004 RA_{84}	—	September 9, 2004	Kleť	Kleť	·	2.6 km	MPC · JPL
197953	2004 RN_{85}	—	September 9, 2004	Hormersdorf	Lorenz, J.	·	2.5 km	MPC · JPL
197954	2004 RF_{86}	—	September 7, 2004	Socorro	LINEAR	·	1.2 km	MPC · JPL
197955	2004 RS_{87}	—	September 7, 2004	Palomar	NEAT	EUN	1.4 km	MPC · JPL
197956	2004 RZ_{89}	—	September 8, 2004	Socorro	LINEAR	V	1.1 km	MPC · JPL
197957	2004 RV_{94}	—	September 8, 2004	Socorro	LINEAR	·	1.7 km	MPC · JPL
197958	2004 RA_{95}	—	September 8, 2004	Socorro	LINEAR	·	2.1 km	MPC · JPL
197959	2004 RD_{97}	—	September 8, 2004	Palomar	NEAT	·	1.8 km	MPC · JPL
197960	2004 RR_{97}	—	September 8, 2004	Socorro	LINEAR	·	1.9 km	MPC · JPL
197961	2004 RB_{98}	—	September 8, 2004	Socorro	LINEAR	·	1.4 km	MPC · JPL
197962	2004 RT_{99}	—	September 8, 2004	Socorro	LINEAR	·	1.3 km	MPC · JPL
197963	2004 RP_{102}	—	September 8, 2004	Socorro	LINEAR	V	1.2 km	MPC · JPL
197964	2004 RF_{103}	—	September 8, 2004	Palomar	NEAT	·	1.3 km	MPC · JPL
197965	2004 RR_{103}	—	September 8, 2004	Palomar	NEAT	·	2.1 km	MPC · JPL
197966	2004 RX_{105}	—	September 8, 2004	Palomar	NEAT	·	2.1 km	MPC · JPL
197967	2004 RV_{106}	—	September 8, 2004	Campo Imperatore	CINEOS	·	1.8 km	MPC · JPL
197968	2004 RV_{108}	—	September 9, 2004	Kitt Peak	Spacewatch	V	1.2 km	MPC · JPL
197969	2004 RW_{108}	—	September 9, 2004	Kitt Peak	Spacewatch	·	1.5 km	MPC · JPL
197970	2004 RZ_{109}	—	September 11, 2004	Socorro	LINEAR	·	2.1 km	MPC · JPL
197971	2004 RW_{110}	—	September 11, 2004	Goodricke-Pigott	R. A. Tucker	NYS	1.2 km	MPC · JPL
197972	2004 RZ_{112}	—	September 6, 2004	Socorro	LINEAR	·	2.4 km	MPC · JPL
197973	2004 RB_{132}	—	September 7, 2004	Kitt Peak	Spacewatch	·	900 m	MPC · JPL
197974	2004 RM_{135}	—	September 7, 2004	Kitt Peak	Spacewatch	·	1.7 km	MPC · JPL
197975	2004 RY_{137}	—	September 8, 2004	Socorro	LINEAR	·	2.1 km	MPC · JPL
197976	2004 RX_{139}	—	September 8, 2004	Socorro	LINEAR	·	3.5 km	MPC · JPL
197977	2004 RF_{141}	—	September 8, 2004	Socorro	LINEAR	ERI	2.8 km	MPC · JPL
197978	2004 RU_{141}	—	September 8, 2004	Socorro	LINEAR	·	1.6 km	MPC · JPL
197979	2004 RV_{144}	—	September 9, 2004	Socorro	LINEAR	·	1.7 km	MPC · JPL
197980	2004 RW_{144}	—	September 9, 2004	Socorro	LINEAR	·	1.5 km	MPC · JPL
197981	2004 RG_{145}	—	September 9, 2004	Socorro	LINEAR	·	1.6 km	MPC · JPL
197982	2004 RW_{146}	—	September 9, 2004	Socorro	LINEAR	ERI	2.2 km	MPC · JPL
197983	2004 RP_{147}	—	September 9, 2004	Socorro	LINEAR	MAS	910 m	MPC · JPL
197984	2004 RW_{149}	—	September 9, 2004	Socorro	LINEAR	·	2.1 km	MPC · JPL
197985	2004 RC_{150}	—	September 9, 2004	Socorro	LINEAR	·	2.1 km	MPC · JPL
197986	2004 RM_{151}	—	September 9, 2004	Socorro	LINEAR	·	3.7 km	MPC · JPL
197987	2004 RT_{151}	—	September 9, 2004	Socorro	LINEAR	·	2.4 km	MPC · JPL
197988	2004 RR_{155}	—	September 10, 2004	Socorro	LINEAR	·	1.2 km	MPC · JPL
197989	2004 RC_{156}	—	September 10, 2004	Socorro	LINEAR	·	1.5 km	MPC · JPL
197990	2004 RT_{156}	—	September 10, 2004	Socorro	LINEAR	·	1.5 km	MPC · JPL
197991	2004 RS_{158}	—	September 10, 2004	Socorro	LINEAR	·	2.4 km	MPC · JPL
197992	2004 RH_{159}	—	September 10, 2004	Socorro	LINEAR	·	1.7 km	MPC · JPL
197993	2004 RQ_{163}	—	September 9, 2004	Socorro	LINEAR	NYS	1.5 km	MPC · JPL
197994	2004 RG_{165}	—	September 11, 2004	Socorro	LINEAR	·	2.4 km	MPC · JPL
197995	2004 RD_{167}	—	September 7, 2004	Socorro	LINEAR	·	1.6 km	MPC · JPL
197996	2004 RT_{170}	—	September 8, 2004	Palomar	NEAT	MAR	1.7 km	MPC · JPL
197997	2004 RC_{171}	—	September 9, 2004	Socorro	LINEAR	·	1.3 km	MPC · JPL
197998	2004 RO_{171}	—	September 9, 2004	Socorro	LINEAR	V	940 m	MPC · JPL
197999	2004 RP_{177}	—	September 10, 2004	Socorro	LINEAR	V	1.0 km	MPC · JPL
198000	2004 RS_{177}	—	September 10, 2004	Socorro	LINEAR	V	980 m	MPC · JPL

back to top

== See also ==
- Meanings of minor-planet names: 197001–198000
