= 15092 Beegees =

Main-belt asteroid

Discovery
- Discovered by: J. Broughton
- Discovery site: Reedy Creek Obs.
- Discovery date: 15 March 1999

Designations
- Named after: Bee Gees (British musical trio)
- Alternative designations: 1999 EH_{5} · 1975 TL_{1} 1983 FR · 1983 HG_{1} 1988 BV_{1}
- Minor planet category: main-belt · (outer); Eos

Orbital characteristics
- Epoch 23 March 2018 (JD 2458200.5)
- Uncertainty parameter 0
- Observation arc: 42.40 yr (15,486 d)
- Aphelion: 3.0985 AU
- Perihelion: 2.9219 AU
- Semi-major axis: 3.0102 AU
- Eccentricity: 0.0293
- Orbital period (sidereal): 5.22 yr (1,908 d)
- Mean anomaly: 302.74°
- Mean motion: 0° 11^{m} 19.32^{s} / day
- Inclination: 9.6966°
- Longitude of ascending node: 356.02°
- Argument of perihelion: 123.03°

Physical characteristics
- Mean diameter: 12.012±0.273 km
- Geometric albedo: 0.122±0.015
- Spectral type: S (SDSS-MOC)
- Absolute magnitude (H): 12.1

15092 Beegees (provisional designation 1999 EH_{5}) is a stony Eoan asteroid from the outer regions of the asteroid belt, approximately 12 kilometers (7.5 miles) in diameter. It was discovered on 15 March 1999, by Australian amateur astronomer John Broughton at his Reedy Creek Observatory in Queensland, Australia. The S-type asteroid was named for the brothers of the Gibb family, known as the musical trio Bee Gees.

== Orbit and classification ==
Beegees is a core member the Eos family (606), the largest stony asteroid family in the outer main belt, consisting of nearly 10,000 known asteroids.

It orbits the Sun at a distance of 2.9–3.1 AU once every 5 years and 3 months (1,908 days; semi-major axis of 3.01 AU). Its orbit has an eccentricity of 0.03 and an inclination of 10° with respect to the ecliptic. The body's observation arc begins with its first observation as 1975 TL_{1} at Crimea–Nauchnij in October 1975, more than 23 years prior to its official discovery observation at Reedy Creek.

== Physical characteristics ==
In the SDSS-based taxonomy, Beegees is a common, stony S-type asteroid, which is also the overall spectral type for members of the Eos family. The asteroid has an absolute magnitude of 12.1. As of 2018, no rotational lightcurve has been obtained from photometric observations. The body's rotation period, pole and shape remain unknown.

=== Diameter and albedo ===
According to the survey carried out by the NEOWISE mission of NASA's Wide-field Infrared Survey Explorer, Beegees measures 12.012 kilometers in diameter and its surface has an albedo of 0.122.

== Naming ==
This minor planet was named for the members the British pop-rock-disco group Bee Gees: Barry Gibb (born 1946), Robin Gibb (1949–2012), and Maurice Gibb (1949–2003), as well as for their younger brother and solo singer, Andy Gibb (1958–1988), who was never a member of the group. The renowned musicians were raised in Australia, only 100 kilometers from the Reedy Creek Observatory where this asteroid was discovered. The official naming citation was published by the Minor Planet Center on 9 May 2001 (M.P.C. 42674).
