= Reedy Creek Observatory =

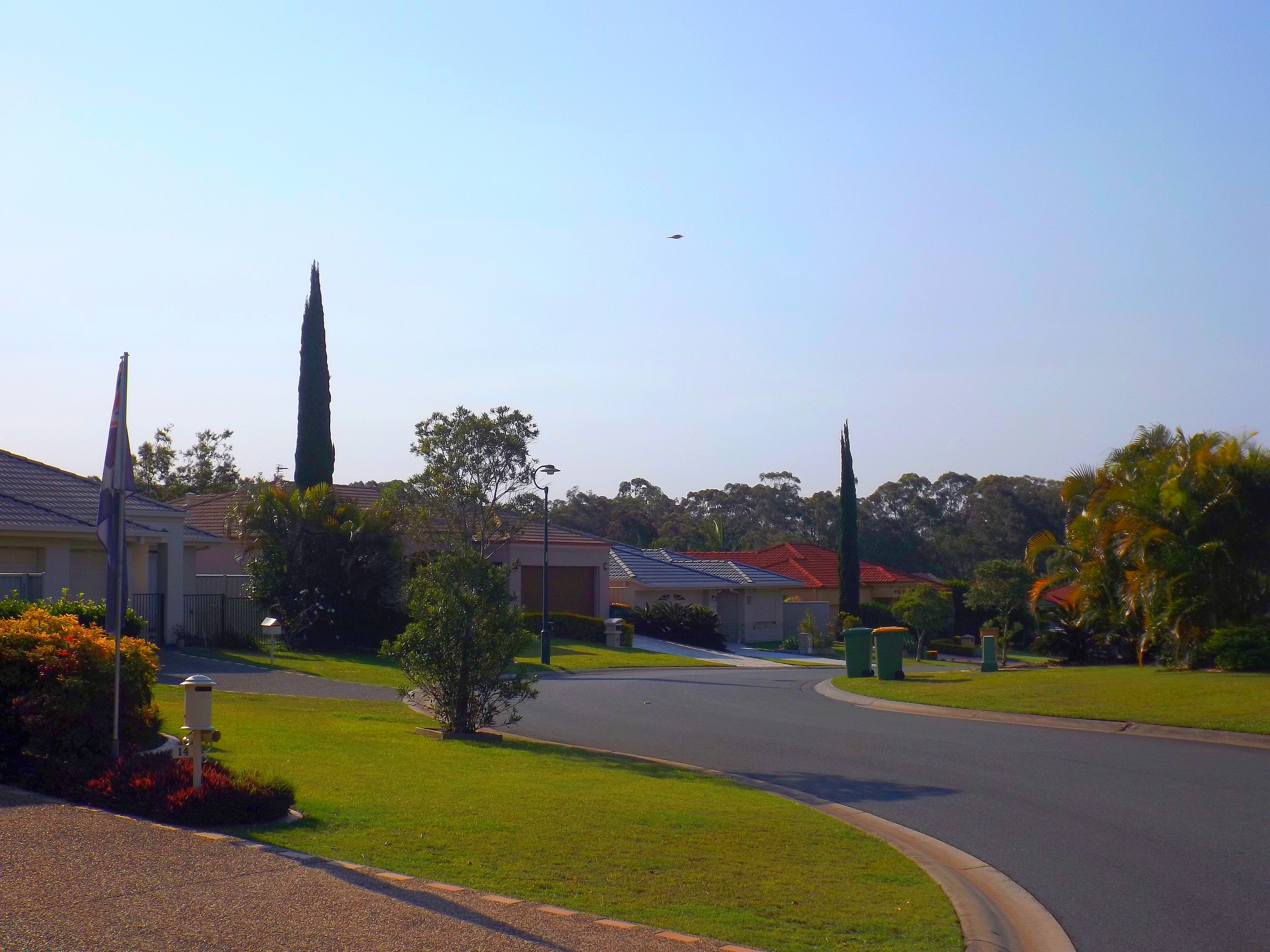
- Observatory code: 428
- Location: Reedy Creek, City of Gold Coast, Queensland, AUS
- Coordinates: 28°06′S 153°24′E

Reedy Creek Observatory (observatory code: 428) is an amateur astronomical observatory and is the location for observations of near-Earth objects by John Broughton, an Australian astronomer. As of 22 October 2025, Reedy Creek Observatory was ranked 36th in the world by the Minor Planet Center on its list of "most prolific discovery sites", with 1,237 discoveries between 1997, the year of its first light, and 2008.

The observatory is located in Reedy Creek, a suburb of Gold Coast, Queensland, at 66 metres (217 ft) above sea level.

== Telescopes and instruments ==
The observatory uses a 0.51m f/2.7 Newtonian with an Apogee AP6Ep CCD camera, which can image one square degree per frame. The CCD sensor is cooled to -20 °C. The instrument has a limiting magnitude of 19.2. Sky conditions are usually moderately light-polluted. Plano-convex lenses of 75 mm were custom-made by Broughton. Other customizations include the telescope mount and Broughton's own "Scantracker" software to automate pre-programmed pointing and imaging sequences.

The telescope's timing precision is documented in the Minor Planet Center's document archives, which show Root Mean Square (RMS) residuals of less than 0.5 arcseconds, with many observations recorded at near-zero arcsecond error. Timing precision is crucial for telescopes on Earth to be able to coordinate data, and it is also important in the ability to calculate the size and shape of objects accurately during occultations.

== Minor planet discoveries ==
Reedy Creek Observatory has discovered more than 800 asteroids. Among the numbered asteroids credited to this observatory are:

- (19578) Kirkdouglas
- (19535) Rowanatkinson
- (23032) Fossey
- (18839) Whiteley
- (15092) Beegees
- (8749) Beatles
- (18749) Lexcen

== Occultation data from Pluto ==
The observatory has contributed data from two occultations of Pluto. The first occultation occurred on 12 June 2006. The data was used to establish new information regarding Pluto's atmosphere. Among other discoveries, Pluto's surface nitrogen frost was judged to be 1.2–1.7 K warmer in 2006 than measured during a previous occultation in 1988. The upper atmosphere of Pluto was shown to hold a steady temperature of ~100 K but there is in this portion of the atmosphere a temperature gradient that is "possibly the result of CO gas."

The second occultation, which was a double occultation of the UCAC2 star 25370733 by Pluto and one of its moons, Charon, occurred on 22 June 2008. Data from this occultation was used to fine-tune the calculated distance between the centers of Pluto and Charon (19,636 km).

== Occultation data from Quaoar ==
In 2022, during the first series of observed stellar occultations by a trans-Neptunian object, Quaoar, field data from Reedy Creek Observatory collected at Mount Carbine, Queensland, along with data from the space telescope CHEOPS, helped establish the limits of a methane atmosphere on Quaoar as well as Quaoar's astrometric position to less than 1 milliarcsecond. CHEOPS observed the occultation in progress, but Reedy Creek Observatory, with its slightly different line of sight, did not, thus enabling the observatory to contribute "negative chord" data, allowing measurements to be far more precise than they otherwise would have been.

The study's co-authors included Nobel laureate Didier Queloz.

During previous Quaoar occultations in 2018 and 2020, the observatory contributed light curve data that helped determine the width, depth, granularity, and orbital radius of an inhomogenous dense ring around Quaoar, one of only three such dense rings found around small bodies in the Solar System. Analysis of the data from this study called for a revision of the traditional notion of the Roche limit, which places a limit on the distance at which a ring can exist away from its parent body before tidal forces will not prevent the accretion of its mass as a satellite.

Study data contributed by Reedy Creek Observatory and others suggested that the Roche limit can be redefined more appropriately as a minimum distance from a planetary body at which a satellite can likely exist, without disturbance from tidal forces from the parent, rather than as a maximum distance from a planetary body at which a ring can exist without accreting as a satellite. Quaoar's ring exists at 7.4 radii from its parent body, well outside the traditional Roche limit at which rings were thought not to exist, thus prompting a revision to an accepted tenet of planetary physics.

For its contributions to the study of the Quaoar occultations in the journals Nature and Astronomy & Astrophysics, Reedy Creek Observatory was included in the Nature Index as the 74th most highly ranked Australian institution in the physical sciences.

== See also ==
- Asteroid 24105 Broughton
- List of astronomical observatories
- John Broughton § List of discovered minor planets
