= John Broughton =

Australian astronomer (born 1952)

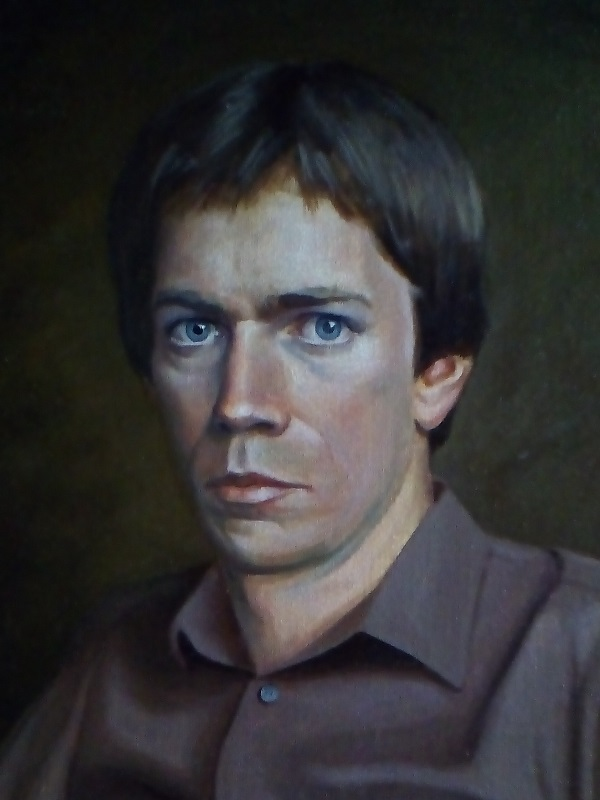
- 1983 portrait of Broughton
- Born: 1952 (age 73–74)
- Known for: Discoverer of minor planets

Minor planets discovered: 1,180
see § List of discovered minor planets

John Broughton (born 1952) is an Australian amateur astronomer and artist. He is among the most prolific discoverers of minor planets worldwide, credited by the Minor Planet Center with more than 1,000 discoveries made between 1997 and 2008. His observations are done at Reedy Creek Observatory (428) in Queensland, Australia.

In 2002, Broughton was one of five astronomers to be awarded a "Gene Shoemaker NEO Grant" by the Planetary Society to support his work on near-Earth asteroids. The money enabled the purchase of a CCD camera for use initially on a 10" SCT and later on a 20" f/2.7 automated telescope he designed and constructed, with first light occurring 10 April 2004.

Asteroid 24105 Broughton was named in his honour in 2005, and he later won the 2008 Page Medal.

== Discoveries and research ==
Broughton is the discoverer of four near-Earth objects, two of which are potentially hazardous asteroids (PHA). Discovered 11 April 2004 on the first full night of operations with the 20" telescope, Apollo asteroid (186844) 2004 GA_{1} is one of only 157 known kilometer-size PHAs and the largest such discovery made by a non-professional astronomer. The short-period comet 513P/Broughton was discovered in October 2005, followed nine months later by the hyperbolic comet C/2006 OF2 (Broughton) at a distant 7.7 AU from the sun and more than two years from reaching its perihelion.

In 2003, Broughton began observing asteroid occultations by taking trailed CCD exposures and measuring the resulting dips in brightness. Subsequently, he developed methods and applications to facilitate the observation, timing and analysis. By 2010, he had switched to using sensitive video cameras, and began designing telescopes better suited to multi-station field work than what is commercially available, culminating in collapsible alt-alt telescopes of moderate size, compact enough to take anywhere in the world in standard airline baggage. In 2011, he formulated a method to derive asteroid dimensions by integrating the results of separate occultations. The tables are periodically updated and now include over 500 asteroids.

=== List of discovered minor planets ===
| 8749 Beatles | 3 April 1998 | list |
| 8958 Stargazer | 23 March 1998 | list |
| 9241 Rosfranklin | 10 August 1997 | list |
| 11196 Michanikos | 22 January 1999 | list |
| 11365 NASA | 23 March 1998 | list |
| 11425 Wearydunlop | 18 June 1999 | list |
| 12113 Hollows | 29 July 1998 | list |
| 12542 Laver | 10 August 1998 | list |
| 13298 Namatjira | 15 September 1998 | list |
| 14621 Tati | 22 October 1998 | list |
| 15092 Beegees | 15 March 1999 | list |
| 15495 Bogie | 17 February 1999 | list |
| 15550 Sydney | 31 March 2000 | list |
| 15947 Milligan | 2 January 1998 | list |
| 16046 Gregnorman | 5 May 1999 | list |
| 16155 Buddy | 3 January 2000 | list |
| 16260 Sputnik | 9 May 2000 | list |
| 17023 Abbott | 7 March 1999 | list |
| 17024 Costello | 15 March 1999 | list |
| 17038 Wake | 26 March 1999 | list |
| 17058 Rocknroll | 13 April 1999 | list |
| 17059 Elvis | 15 April 1999 | list |
| 17078 Sellers | 24 April 1999 | list |
| 17166 Secombe | 17 June 1999 | list |
| 17269 Dicksmith | 3 June 2000 | list |

| 17270 Nolthenius | 4 June 2000 | list |
| 17283 Ustinov | 24 June 2000 | list |
| 17826 Normanwisdom | 3 April 1998 | list |
| 17892 Morecambewise | 15 March 1999 | list |
| 17936 Nilus | 24 April 1999 | list |
| 17945 Hawass | 14 May 1999 | list |
| 18125 Brianwilson | 22 July 2000 | list |
| 18132 Spector | 30 July 2000 | list |
| 18747 Lexcen | 26 March 1999 | list |
| 18839 Whiteley | 5 August 1999 | list |
| 18932 Robinhood | 28 August 2000 | list |
| 19453 Murdochorne | 28 March 1998 | list |
| 19535 Rowanatkinson | 24 April 1999 | list |
| 19578 Kirkdouglas | 20 June 1999 | list |
| 19582 Blow | 13 July 1999 | list |
| 19631 Greensleeves | 13 September 1999 | list |
| 20314 Johnharrison | 28 March 1998 | list |
| 20403 Attenborough | 22 July 1998 | list |
| 20468 Petercook | 13 July 1999 | list |
| 20469 Dudleymoore | 13 July 1999 | list |
| 21476 Petrie | 28 April 1998 | list |
| (21657) Alinecarter | 10 August 1999 | list |
| (21658) 1999 PA_{2} | 10 August 1999 | list |
| (21690) 1999 RA_{39} | 13 September 1999 | list |
| (21692) 1999 RH_{44} | 15 September 1999 | list |

| (22649) Paulineloader | 27 July 1998 | list |
| (22650) Brianloader | 29 July 1998 | list |
| 22754 Olympus | 26 November 1998 | list |
| 23032 Fossey | 3 December 1999 | list |
| 23774 Herbelliott | 26 June 1998 | list |
| 24450 Victorchang | 29 August 2000 | list |
| (25016) 1998 QJ_{4} | 18 August 1998 | list |
| 25058 Shanegould | 25 August 1998 | list |
| (25217) 1998 TX_{1} | 13 October 1998 | list |
| (25218) 1998 TZ_{1} | 13 October 1998 | list |
| (25220) 1998 TQ_{6} | 15 October 1998 | list |
| (25272) 1998 VK_{32} | 14 November 1998 | list |
| (25274) 1998 VE_{33} | 15 November 1998 | list |
| (25833) 2000 ED_{15} | 5 March 2000 | list |
| (25848) 2000 EL_{104} | 14 March 2000 | list |
| (25939) 2001 EQ | 3 March 2001 | list |
| (26316) 1998 US_{16} | 22 October 1998 | list |
| (26613) 2000 GL_{2} | 3 April 2000 | list |
| (26647) 2000 LT | 2 June 2000 | list |
| (26716) 2001 HZ_{3} | 18 April 2001 | list |
| (26731) 2001 HE_{14} | 23 April 2001 | list |
| (27626) 2001 NA | 1 July 2001 | list |
| (28058) 1998 NF | 1 July 1998 | list |
| (28062) 1998 OZ_{11} | 22 July 1998 | list |
| (28339) 1999 EC_{3} | 10 March 1999 | list |

| (28540) 2000 EC_{4} | 4 March 2000 | list |
| (28615) 2000 FS_{10} | 31 March 2000 | list |
| (28913) 2000 OT | 23 July 2000 | list |
| (29872) 1999 GO_{6} | 15 April 1999 | list |
| 29898 Richardnugent | 19 April 1999 | list |
| (30079) 2000 EP_{104} | 15 March 2000 | list |
| (30419) 2000 LU | 2 June 2000 | list |
| 30439 Moe | 21 June 2000 | list |
| 30440 Larry | 22 June 2000 | list |
| 30441 Curly | 24 June 2000 | list |
| 30444 Shemp | 5 July 2000 | list |
| (30526) 2001 NC_{2} | 13 July 2001 | list |
| (31117) 1997 QF_{5} | 25 August 1997 | list |
| 31344 Agathon | 30 July 1998 | list |
| (31450) 1999 CU_{9} | 14 February 1999 | list |
| (31552) 1999 EJ | 7 March 1999 | list |
| (31608) 1999 GR_{5} | 12 April 1999 | list |
| (31804) 1999 MG | 18 June 1999 | list |
| (32118) 2000 LW_{5} | 6 June 2000 | list |
| (32154) 2000 MH | 23 June 2000 | list |
| (32156) 2000 MY | 24 June 2000 | list |
| (32157) 2000 MR_{1} | 26 June 2000 | list |
| (32158) 2000 MD_{2} | 29 June 2000 | list |
| (32197) 2000 OV | 24 July 2000 | list |
| (32201) 2000 OZ_{2} | 29 July 2000 | list |

| (32202) 2000 OA_{3} | 29 July 2000 | list |
| (32510) 2001 NS | 12 July 2001 | list |
| (33026) 1997 PD_{6} | 5 August 1997 | list |
| (33110) 1998 AM_{10} | 2 January 1998 | list |
| (33430) 1999 EH | 7 March 1999 | list |
| (33530) 1999 HH_{1} | 19 April 1999 | list |
| (33543) 1999 JR_{8} | 13 May 1999 | list |
| (33722) 1999 NO | 7 July 1999 | list |
| (33748) 1999 PP_{4} | 15 August 1999 | list |
| (33883) 2000 KD_{4} | 27 May 2000 | list |
| (33946) 2000 MV | 24 June 2000 | list |
| (33992) 2000 OQ | 23 July 2000 | list |
| (33993) 2000 OS | 23 July 2000 | list |
| (34212) 2000 QZ_{68} | 28 August 2000 | list |
| (35773) 1999 JT_{7} | 13 May 1999 | list |
| (35982) 1999 NJ_{4} | 11 July 1999 | list |
| (36039) 1999 PA_{4} | 13 August 1999 | list |
| (36358) 2000 OY_{2} | 29 July 2000 | list |
| (36365) 2000 OO_{9} | 30 July 2000 | list |
| (36428) 2000 PV_{8} | 9 August 2000 | list |
| (37857) 1998 EV_{14} | 5 March 1998 | list |
| (38036) 1998 RE_{1} | 13 September 1998 | list |
| (38210) 1999 NP_{4} | 13 July 1999 | list |
| (38241) 1999 PU_{1} | 9 August 1999 | list |
| (38242) 1999 PB_{2} | 10 August 1999 | list |

| (38243) 1999 PB_{4} | 13 August 1999 | list |
| (38244) 1999 PD_{4} | 13 August 1999 | list |
| (38668) 2000 PM | 1 August 2000 | list |
| (38724) 2000 QW_{129} | 31 August 2000 | list |
| (40006) 1998 HV_{101} | 24 April 1998 | list |
| (40104) 1998 QE_{4} | 17 August 1998 | list |
| (40121) 1998 QA_{29} | 18 August 1998 | list |
| (40228) 1998 TR_{1} | 12 October 1998 | list |
| (40234) 1998 UG_{4} | 21 October 1998 | list |
| (40273) 1999 JS_{7} | 13 May 1999 | list |
| (40327) 1999 MB | 17 June 1999 | list |
| (40332) 1999 NK | 6 July 1999 | list |
| (40452) 1999 RV_{38} | 12 September 1999 | list |
| (40453) 1999 RX_{38} | 13 September 1999 | list |
| (40716) 1999 SL | 16 September 1999 | list |
| 41488 Sindbad | 29 August 2000 | list |
| (42601) 1998 AN_{10} | 2 January 1998 | list |
| (42837) 1999 PR_{1} | 9 August 1999 | list |
| (42840) 1999 RU | 4 September 1999 | list |
| 43293 Banting | 1 April 2000 | list |
| (43588) 2001 PL_{14} | 14 August 2001 | list |
| (44188) 1998 KJ_{58} | 21 May 1998 | list |
| (44211) 1998 OC_{12} | 23 July 1998 | list |
| (44212) 1998 OJ_{12} | 29 July 1998 | list |
| 44217 Whittle | 12 August 1998 | list |

| (44425) 1998 TY_{1} | 13 October 1998 | list |
| (44430) 1998 TZ_{6} | 15 October 1998 | list |
| (44529) 1998 YP_{7} | 22 December 1998 | list |
| (44592) 1999 OM | 17 July 1999 | list |
| (44595) 1999 PE | 4 August 1999 | list |
| (44596) 1999 PF | 4 August 1999 | list |
| (45764) 2000 LV | 2 June 2000 | list |
| (45766) 2000 LX_{5} | 6 June 2000 | list |
| (45803) 2000 QH_{1} | 23 August 2000 | list |
| (46097) 2001 FN_{1} | 19 March 2001 | list |
| (46783) 1998 HU_{101} | 24 April 1998 | list |
| (46990) 1998 TY_{6} | 15 October 1998 | list |
| (47141) 1999 HB_{3} | 24 April 1999 | list |
| (48337) 2002 PT_{6} | 5 August 2002 | list |
| (48777) 1997 QE_{5} | 25 August 1997 | list |
| (48923) 1998 OY_{11} | 22 July 1998 | list |
| (48924) 1998 OK_{12} | 29 July 1998 | list |
| (48931) 1998 PM_{1} | 10 August 1998 | list |
| (48959) 1998 QQ_{26} | 24 August 1998 | list |
| (49280) 1998 UT_{22} | 28 October 1998 | list |
| (51064) 2000 GY_{143} | 11 April 2000 | list |
| (51322) 2000 LY_{5} | 6 June 2000 | list |
| (51333) 2000 ME | 22 June 2000 | list |
| (51398) 2001 DJ_{80} | 24 February 2001 | list |
| (51451) 2001 FE_{31} | 22 March 2001 | list |

| (51571) 2001 HF_{4} | 19 April 2001 | list |
| (51590) 2001 HF_{14} | 23 April 2001 | list |
| (51817) 2001 OA_{13} | 21 July 2001 | list |
| (51841) 2001 OO_{65} | 23 July 2001 | list |
| (52718) 1998 FL_{126} | 27 March 1998 | list |
| (52801) 1998 QG_{63} | 24 August 1998 | list |
| (53164) 1999 CV_{9} | 14 February 1999 | list |
| (53247) 1999 DE_{2} | 17 February 1999 | list |
| (53306) 1999 HA_{3} | 24 April 1999 | list |
| (53318) 1999 JV_{7} | 13 May 1999 | list |
| (54402) Jonathanbradshaw | 4 June 2000 | list |
| (54403) Langersek | 4 June 2000 | list |
| (54437) 2000 MW | 24 June 2000 | list |
| (54447) 2000 NX_{1} | 5 July 2000 | list |
| (54463) 2000 OS_{1} | 27 July 2000 | list |
| 54521 Aladdin | 23 August 2000 | list |
| (54530) 2000 QN_{26} | 27 August 2000 | list |
| (54818) 2001 NR | 12 July 2001 | list |
| (54821) 2001 NB_{2} | 13 July 2001 | list |
| (54843) 2001 OX_{2} | 19 July 2001 | list |
| (54844) 2001 OY_{2} | 19 July 2001 | list |
| (54890) 2001 OS_{65} | 28 July 2001 | list |
| (55976) 1998 RE_{5} | 15 September 1998 | list |
| (56117) 1999 CC_{9} | 13 February 1999 | list |
| (56194) 1999 GV_{5} | 15 April 1999 | list |

| (56371) 2000 EC_{15} | 5 March 2000 | list |
| (56392) 2000 ET_{106} | 15 March 2000 | list |
| (56563) 2000 JS_{8} | 6 May 2000 | list |
| (56594) 2000 JL_{40} | 11 May 2000 | list |
| (56708) 2000 MZ | 24 June 2000 | list |
| (56709) 2000 MY_{1} | 27 June 2000 | list |
| (56816) 2000 QQ | 21 August 2000 | list |
| (56817) 2000 QF_{1} | 23 August 2000 | list |
| (57069) 2001 OA_{3} | 19 July 2001 | list |
| (57073) 2001 OB_{13} | 21 July 2001 | list |
| (57152) 2001 QL_{2} | 17 August 2001 | list |
| (57193) 2001 QF_{34} | 19 August 2001 | list |
| (58921) 1998 KH_{58} | 21 May 1998 | list |
| (58922) 1998 KK_{58} | 22 May 1998 | list |
| (59472) 1999 HX | 19 April 1999 | list |
| (59500) 1999 JT_{8} | 14 May 1999 | list |
| (59757) 1999 ME | 18 June 1999 | list |
| (59759) 1999 MR | 20 June 1999 | list |
| (59765) 1999 NN_{4} | 13 July 1999 | list |
| (59794) 1999 OE_{1} | 18 July 1999 | list |
| (59799) 1999 PC_{2} | 10 August 1999 | list |
| (61066) 2000 LV_{5} | 4 June 2000 | list |
| (61121) 2000 MU | 23 June 2000 | list |
| (61124) 2000 MX_{1} | 27 June 2000 | list |
| (61132) 2000 NC_{2} | 5 July 2000 | list |

| (61209) 2000 OM_{9} | 30 July 2000 | list |
| (61341) 2000 PC_{3} | 1 August 2000 | list |
| (61385) 2000 QG_{1} | 23 August 2000 | list |
| (61549) 2000 QJ_{68} | 28 August 2000 | list |
| (63428) 2001 MC_{1} | 18 June 2001 | list |
| (63451) 2001 OB | 16 July 2001 | list |
| (63475) 2001 OB_{32} | 23 July 2001 | list |
| (63498) 2001 OQ_{65} | 28 July 2001 | list |
| (63523) 2001 PH_{1} | 9 August 2001 | list |
| (65286) 2002 HC_{8} | 21 April 2002 | list |
| (65377) 2002 PT_{63} | 12 August 2002 | list |
| (65867) 1997 QG_{5} | 25 August 1997 | list |
| (65904) 1998 DL_{35} | 26 February 1998 | list |
| (66005) 1998 OA_{12} | 22 July 1998 | list |
| (66236) 1999 EP_{3} | 14 March 1999 | list |
| (66264) 1999 HR | 18 April 1999 | list |
| (66273) 1999 JU_{7} | 13 May 1999 | list |
| (66274) 1999 JS_{8} | 14 May 1999 | list |
| (66483) 1999 RZ_{38} | 13 September 1999 | list |
| (67355) 2000 KM_{4} | 28 May 2000 | list |
| (67369) 2000 MF_{2} | 29 June 2000 | list |
| (68373) 2001 PP_{13} | 13 August 2001 | list |
| (68374) 2001 PM_{14} | 14 August 2001 | list |
| (69118) 2003 EK_{16} | 8 March 2003 | list |
| (69157) 2003 JZ_{3} | 3 May 2003 | list |

| (69770) 1998 QN_{26} | 24 August 1998 | list |
| (69803) 1998 RL_{20} | 15 September 1998 | list |
| (69918) 1998 TP_{6} | 15 October 1998 | list |
| (70170) 1999 OD_{1} | 18 July 1999 | list |
| (70174) 1999 PJ_{3} | 11 August 1999 | list |
| (70175) 1999 PU_{4} | 15 August 1999 | list |
| (71630) 2000 EN_{75} | 6 March 2000 | list |
| (72584) 2001 FO_{1} | 19 March 2001 | list |
| (72818) 2001 HM | 16 April 2001 | list |
| (72824) 2001 HG_{4} | 19 April 2001 | list |
| (72911) 2001 OC_{32} | 23 July 2001 | list |
| (73296) 2002 JY_{67} | 12 May 2002 | list |
| (73404) 2002 LL_{24} | 9 June 2002 | list |
| (73435) 2002 MS | 18 June 2002 | list |
| (73553) 2003 QH_{30} | 22 August 2003 | list |
| (73932) 1997 QD_{5} | 25 August 1997 | list |
| (74085) 1998 OB_{12} | 22 July 1998 | list |
| (74086) 1998 OE_{12} | 28 July 1998 | list |
| (74563) 1999 MQ | 20 June 1999 | list |
| (74588) 1999 OO_{1} | 19 July 1999 | list |
| (74626) 1999 RW_{38} | 12 September 1999 | list |
| (77175) 2001 FP_{1} | 19 March 2001 | list |
| (77186) 2001 FS_{9} | 20 March 2001 | list |
| (77697) 2001 OC_{3} | 19 July 2001 | list |
| (77768) 2001 QM | 16 August 2001 | list |

| (78117) 2002 NR | 4 July 2002 | list |
| (78141) 2002 NY_{16} | 13 July 2002 | list |
| (78169) 2002 NB_{31} | 15 July 2002 | list |
| (78209) 2002 OA | 16 July 2002 | list |
| (78240) 2002 ON_{22} | 31 July 2002 | list |
| (78282) 2002 PF_{40} | 10 August 2002 | list |
| (78307) 2002 PS_{63} | 12 August 2002 | list |
| (79526) 1998 OL_{12} | 30 July 1998 | list |
| (79530) 1998 QD_{4} | 17 August 1998 | list |
| (81875) 2000 LU_{5} | 4 June 2000 | list |
| (81908) 2000 NW_{2} | 6 July 2000 | list |
| (81929) 2000 OE | 22 July 2000 | list |
| (82169) 2001 HY_{3} | 18 April 2001 | list |
| (82185) 2001 HD_{23} | 27 April 2001 | list |
| (82364) 2001 MW_{7} | 20 June 2001 | list |
| (82370) 2001 MD_{14} | 26 June 2001 | list |
| (82448) 2001 OM_{9} | 20 July 2001 | list |
| (82449) 2001 ON_{9} | 20 July 2001 | list |
| (84009) 2002 OM_{22} | 31 July 2002 | list |
| (86049) 1999 PH_{4} | 13 August 1999 | list |
| (87037) 2000 KC_{4} | 27 May 2000 | list |
| (87124) 2000 MQ_{1} | 26 June 2000 | list |
| (87168) 2000 OW | 24 July 2000 | list |
| (87310) 2000 QE_{1} | 23 August 2000 | list |
| (87392) 2000 QB_{69} | 29 August 2000 | list |

| (87464) 2000 QV_{129} | 31 August 2000 | list |
| (90368) 2003 MG | 19 June 2003 | list |
| (91027) 1998 DM_{35} | 26 February 1998 | list |
| (91426) 1999 PE_{4} | 13 August 1999 | list |
| (91899) 1999 VT_{11} | 7 November 1999 | list |
| (91904) 1999 VW_{19} | 7 November 1999 | list |
| (92314) 2000 GV_{1} | 3 April 2000 | list |
| (92442) 2000 KF_{4} | 27 May 2000 | list |
| (92456) 2000 KB_{34} | 29 May 2000 | list |
| (92473) 2000 LP | 2 June 2000 | list |
| (92490) 2000 MG_{2} | 29 June 2000 | list |
| (92491) 2000 MA_{3} | 29 June 2000 | list |
| (92496) 2000 NB_{2} | 5 July 2000 | list |
| (92563) 2000 OZ_{50} | 30 July 2000 | list |
| (92648) 2000 QF_{35} | 28 August 2000 | list |
| (95921) 2003 HJ_{53} | 30 April 2003 | list |
| (95940) 2003 LT_{2} | 1 June 2003 | list |
| (95941) 2003 LX_{3} | 5 June 2003 | list |
| (95942) 2003 LU_{5} | 4 June 2003 | list |
| (95943) 2003 LY_{6} | 9 June 2003 | list |
| (96009) 2004 OB_{6} | 18 July 2004 | list |
| (96026) 2004 PO_{27} | 9 August 2004 | list |
| (96034) 2004 PW_{42} | 10 August 2004 | list |
| (96043) 2004 PC_{93} | 12 August 2004 | list |
| (96044) 2004 PU_{95} | 13 August 2004 | list |

| (96045) 2004 PX_{97} | 14 August 2004 | list |
| (96047) 2004 QW_{6} | 21 August 2004 | list |
| (96742) 1999 ON | 17 July 1999 | list |
| (97785) 2000 NZ_{1} | 5 July 2000 | list |
| (97836) 2000 PW_{8} | 9 August 2000 | list |
| (97872) 2000 QG_{35} | 28 August 2000 | list |
| (99237) 2001 KD_{33} | 24 May 2001 | list |
| (99825) 2002 NK_{7} | 12 July 2002 | list |
| (100935) 1998 MA_{42} | 26 June 1998 | list |
| (101872) 1999 NO_{4} | 13 July 1999 | list |
| (101897) 1999 PO_{4} | 15 August 1999 | list |
| (105091) 2000 LO | 2 June 2000 | list |
| (105128) 2000 MW_{1} | 27 June 2000 | list |
| (105129) 2000 MH_{2} | 29 June 2000 | list |
| (108183) 2001 HG_{14} | 23 April 2001 | list |
| (108186) 2001 HX_{15} | 24 April 2001 | list |
| (108568) 2001 MA_{1} | 18 June 2001 | list |
| (108569) 2001 MB_{1} | 18 June 2001 | list |
| (108734) 2001 OD_{32} | 23 July 2001 | list |
| (108790) 2001 OT_{65} | 28 July 2001 | list |
| (108807) 2001 ON_{74} | 29 July 2001 | list |
| (108951) 2001 PT_{28} | 15 August 2001 | list |
| (109007) 2001 QN_{2} | 17 August 2001 | list |
| (109008) 2001 QO_{2} | 17 August 2001 | list |
| (109098) 2001 QG_{34} | 19 August 2001 | list |

| (112288) 2002 LK_{31} | 10 June 2002 | list |
| (112330) 2002 NC_{1} | 5 July 2002 | list |
| (112332) 2002 NT_{1} | 6 July 2002 | list |
| (112386) 2002 NL_{29} | 14 July 2002 | list |
| (112387) 2002 NM_{29} | 14 July 2002 | list |
| (112389) 2002 NC_{31} | 15 July 2002 | list |
| (112434) 2002 OD | 16 July 2002 | list |
| (112444) 2002 OR_{4} | 16 July 2002 | list |
| (112540) 2002 PE_{40} | 10 August 2002 | list |
| (112660) 2002 PX_{86} | 14 August 2002 | list |
| (114754) 2003 HX_{42} | 29 April 2003 | list |
| (114767) 2003 JE_{11} | 2 May 2003 | list |
| (114771) 2003 JB_{17} | 10 May 2003 | list |
| (114772) 2003 KD_{4} | 24 May 2003 | list |
| (114773) 2003 KE_{4} | 24 May 2003 | list |
| (114776) 2003 MJ | 20 June 2003 | list |
| (114787) 2003 MX_{9} | 29 June 2003 | list |
| (114788) 2003 MA_{10} | 29 June 2003 | list |
| (114796) 2003 NO_{2} | 3 July 2003 | list |
| (114806) 2003 OR | 20 July 2003 | list |
| (114810) 2003 OQ_{5} | 24 July 2003 | list |
| (114811) 2003 OR_{5} | 24 July 2003 | list |
| (114812) 2003 OU_{5} | 24 July 2003 | list |
| (114818) 2003 OR_{10} | 27 July 2003 | list |
| (114826) 2003 OX_{17} | 29 July 2003 | list |

| (114841) 2003 PF | 1 August 2003 | list |
| (114873) 2003 QZ_{9} | 20 August 2003 | list |
| (116907) 2004 GF_{2} | 10 April 2004 | list |
| (117012) 2004 JZ_{4} | 11 May 2004 | list |
| (117013) 2004 JA_{5} | 12 May 2004 | list |
| (117027) 2004 JS_{12} | 13 May 2004 | list |
| (117028) 2004 JW_{12} | 13 May 2004 | list |
| (117058) 2004 KW | 17 May 2004 | list |
| (117107) 2004 OL_{10} | 21 July 2004 | list |
| (117108) 2004 PU_{1} | 6 August 2004 | list |
| (117147) 2004 PZ_{97} | 14 August 2004 | list |
| (117796) 2005 GY_{140} | 14 April 2005 | list |
| (117797) 2005 GA_{141} | 14 April 2005 | list |
| (117842) 2005 JR_{109} | 15 May 2005 | list |
| (117859) 2005 KV_{9} | 29 May 2005 | list |
| (120139) 2003 GV_{20} | 3 April 2003 | list |
| (120143) 2003 GG_{42} | 9 April 2003 | list |
| (120177) 2003 LW_{3} | 5 June 2003 | list |
| (120180) 2003 QH_{104} | 27 August 2003 | list |
| (120305) 2004 KF | 16 May 2004 | list |
| (120326) 2004 NK_{3} | 9 July 2004 | list |
| (120851) 1998 OF_{12} | 29 July 1998 | list |
| (120968) 1998 VH_{32} | 10 November 1998 | list |
| (121127) 1999 JF_{3} | 8 May 1999 | list |
| (121185) 1999 NP | 7 July 1999 | list |

| (121240) 1999 RG_{44} | 15 September 1999 | list |
| (122209) 2000 MY_{2} | 27 June 2000 | list |
| (127322) 2002 JE_{100} | 14 May 2002 | list |
| (127937) 2003 HZ_{1} | 23 April 2003 | list |
| (127983) 2003 HW_{42} | 29 April 2003 | list |
| (128027) 2003 KT_{3} | 22 May 2003 | list |
| (128037) 2003 KU_{18} | 26 May 2003 | list |
| (128045) 2003 LH_{6} | 6 June 2003 | list |
| (128058) 2003 NJ_{2} | 3 July 2003 | list |
| (128066) 2003 OM | 17 July 2003 | list |
| (128070) 2003 OE_{8} | 25 July 2003 | list |
| (128073) 2003 OQ_{10} | 27 July 2003 | list |
| (128074) 2003 OF_{13} | 27 July 2003 | list |
| (128080) 2003 OQ_{20} | 31 July 2003 | list |
| (128081) 2003 OO_{21} | 29 July 2003 | list |
| (128087) 2003 PH | 1 August 2003 | list |
| (128090) 2003 PJ_{4} | 2 August 2003 | list |
| (128107) 2003 QY_{9} | 20 August 2003 | list |
| (128116) 2003 QE_{30} | 22 August 2003 | list |
| (128147) 2003 QX_{68} | 24 August 2003 | list |
| (128152) 2003 QW_{79} | 25 August 2003 | list |
| (128164) 2003 QJ_{104} | 30 August 2003 | list |
| (128427) 2004 MQ_{7} | 28 June 2004 | list |
| (128428) 2004 NJ | 8 July 2004 | list |
| (128429) 2004 NK | 8 July 2004 | list |

| (128466) 2004 OH_{10} | 21 July 2004 | list |
| (128470) 2004 OX_{12} | 28 July 2004 | list |
| (128475) 2004 PW_{1} | 6 August 2004 | list |
| (128565) 2004 PY_{92} | 11 August 2004 | list |
| (128566) 2004 PZ_{92} | 11 August 2004 | list |
| (128578) 2004 PW_{104} | 15 August 2004 | list |
| (128592) 2004 QM_{5} | 21 August 2004 | list |
| (129215) 2005 NQ_{79} | 9 July 2005 | list |
| (129813) 1999 NJ | 6 July 1999 | list |
| (130443) 2000 QC_{26} | 26 August 2000 | list |
| (131351) 2001 JE | 2 May 2001 | list |
| (131416) 2001 OA | 16 July 2001 | list |
| (133079) 2003 JO_{17} | 11 May 2003 | list |
| (133094) 2003 ND_{5} | 5 July 2003 | list |
| (133095) 2003 NU_{6} | 7 July 2003 | list |
| (133104) 2003 OP_{8} | 26 July 2003 | list |
| (133106) 2003 OS_{10} | 27 July 2003 | list |
| (133107) 2003 OX_{10} | 27 July 2003 | list |
| (133108) 2003 OM_{13} | 28 July 2003 | list |
| (133111) 2003 OW_{20} | 31 July 2003 | list |
| (133159) 2003 QG_{30} | 22 August 2003 | list |
| (133160) 2003 QK_{30} | 24 August 2003 | list |
| (133210) 2003 QZ_{68} | 25 August 2003 | list |
| (133220) 2003 QX_{79} | 25 August 2003 | list |
| (134517) 1999 NN | 7 July 1999 | list |

| (135008) 2001 JB | 2 May 2001 | list |
| (135663) 2002 ND_{1} | 5 July 2002 | list |
| (135674) 2002 ND_{31} | 15 July 2002 | list |
| (136118) 2003 KV | 21 May 2003 | list |
| (137211) 1999 NM_{4} | 13 July 1999 | list |
| (138528) 2000 OX_{21} | 30 July 2000 | list |
| (139306) 2001 KV_{17} | 22 May 2001 | list |
| (139409) 2001 OC_{13} | 21 July 2001 | list |
| (139523) 2001 QH_{2} | 17 August 2001 | list |
| (139524) 2001 QJ_{2} | 17 August 2001 | list |
| (141762) 2002 MR | 18 June 2002 | list |
| (141770) 2002 NS_{2} | 8 July 2002 | list |
| (141829) 2002 OC | 16 July 2002 | list |
| (141844) 2002 OL_{22} | 31 July 2002 | list |
| (141849) 2002 PC | 1 August 2002 | list |
| (141926) 2002 PV_{86} | 14 August 2002 | list |
| (143642) 2003 NV_{6} | 7 July 2003 | list |
| (144785) 2004 HC_{31} | 22 April 2004 | list |
| (144813) 2004 JU_{1} | 10 May 2004 | list |
| (144817) 2004 JB_{5} | 12 May 2004 | list |
| (144818) 2004 JD_{5} | 12 May 2004 | list |
| (144875) 2004 OX | 16 July 2004 | list |
| (145249) 2005 JJ_{109} | 3 May 2005 | list |
| (145293) 2005 KE | 16 May 2005 | list |
| (145303) 2005 KH_{9} | 28 May 2005 | list |

| (145304) 2005 KZ_{9} | 30 May 2005 | list |
| (145308) 2005 LD_{1} | 1 June 2005 | list |
| (145309) 2005 LE_{1} | 1 June 2005 | list |
| (145310) 2005 LF_{1} | 1 June 2005 | list |
| (145311) 2005 LH_{1} | 3 June 2005 | list |
| (145391) 2005 ND_{39} | 2 July 2005 | list |
| (145392) 2005 NS_{39} | 7 July 2005 | list |
| (145404) 2005 NX_{79} | 10 July 2005 | list |
| (145405) 2005 NK_{80} | 13 July 2005 | list |
| (145415) 2005 OW_{14} | 27 July 2005 | list |
| (145578) 2006 PA_{4} | 15 August 2006 | list |
| (145787) 1998 QH_{4} | 18 August 1998 | list |
| (146994) 2002 PR_{63} | 12 August 2002 | list |
| (147663) 2004 KD | 16 May 2004 | list |
| (147682) 2004 OH_{4} | 17 July 2004 | list |
| (149557) 2003 LW_{5} | 4 June 2003 | list |
| (149730) 2004 KG_{5} | 16 May 2004 | list |
| (149752) 2004 OE_{10} | 21 July 2004 | list |
| (149767) 2004 QF_{2} | 19 August 2004 | list |
| (149825) 2005 NK_{39} | 7 July 2005 | list |
| (149826) 2005 NN_{39} | 7 July 2005 | list |
| (149842) 2005 PP_{6} | 9 August 2005 | list |
| (149845) 2005 PE_{20} | 15 August 2005 | list |
| (150687) 2001 OR_{65} | 28 July 2001 | list |
| (150690) 2001 OO_{74} | 29 July 2001 | list |

| (151873) 2003 KL_{9} | 24 May 2003 | list |
| (151876) 2003 NH_{7} | 7 July 2003 | list |
| (152021) 2004 LH_{2} | 10 June 2004 | list |
| (152025) 2004 NP | 8 July 2004 | list |
| (152224) 2005 SJ | 20 September 2005 | list |
| (153027) 2000 OP | 23 July 2000 | list |
| (153364) 2001 QL | 16 August 2001 | list |
| (154581) 2003 JX_{3} | 3 May 2003 | list |
| (154697) 2004 JY_{1} | 10 May 2004 | list |
| (154719) 2004 MV_{4} | 22 June 2004 | list |
| (154720) 2004 MJ_{7} | 27 June 2004 | list |
| (154727) 2004 NR_{3} | 12 July 2004 | list |
| (154747) 2004 OM_{9} | 19 July 2004 | list |
| (154748) 2004 OS_{9} | 20 July 2004 | list |
| (154805) 2004 PF_{93} | 12 August 2004 | list |
| (155007) 2005 OB_{15} | 28 July 2005 | list |
| (156972) 2003 JY_{3} | 3 May 2003 | list |
| (157021) 2003 QA_{69} | 25 August 2003 | list |
| (157138) 2004 OU_{5} | 17 July 2004 | list |
| (157142) 2004 PV_{1} | 6 August 2004 | list |
| (157143) 2004 PX_{1} | 6 August 2004 | list |
| (158733) 2003 OS_{5} | 24 July 2003 | list |
| (158843) 2004 NG | 8 July 2004 | list |
| (158856) 2004 OG_{4} | 17 July 2004 | list |
| (158858) 2004 PT_{1} | 6 August 2004 | list |

| (158874) 2004 PP_{27} | 9 August 2004 | list |
| (159461) 2000 OR | 23 July 2000 | list |
| (159777) 2003 KX | 21 May 2003 | list |
| (159783) 2003 MY_{9} | 29 June 2003 | list |
| (160322) 2003 LA_{4} | 5 June 2003 | list |
| (160326) 2003 NF_{7} | 7 July 2003 | list |
| (160390) 2004 NQ_{8} | 14 July 2004 | list |
| (160425) 2005 JF | 2 May 2005 | list |
| (161302) 2003 NK_{2} | 3 July 2003 | list |
| (161303) 2003 NT_{6} | 6 July 2003 | list |
| (161308) 2003 OU_{20} | 31 July 2003 | list |
| (161330) 2003 QY_{79} | 26 August 2003 | list |
| (161336) 2003 RQ_{1} | 2 September 2003 | list |
| (161492) 2004 LG_{2} | 10 June 2004 | list |
| (162092) 1998 QA_{4} | 17 August 1998 | list |
| (162115) 1998 SP_{10} | 19 September 1998 | list |
| (163346) 2002 NS | 4 July 2002 | list |
| (163740) 2003 LU_{2} | 1 June 2003 | list |
| (163741) 2003 LV_{3} | 1 June 2003 | list |
| (163744) 2003 MY_{3} | 26 June 2003 | list |
| (163748) 2003 NM_{2} | 3 July 2003 | list |
| (163751) 2003 OQ | 20 July 2003 | list |
| (163812) 2003 RR_{1} | 2 September 2003 | list |
| (164219) 2004 QK_{3} | 21 August 2004 | list |
| (164551) 2006 KM_{1} | 19 May 2006 | list |

| (164590) 2007 PF_{25} | 11 August 2007 | list |
| (166371) 2002 LL_{31} | 10 June 2002 | list |
| (166423) 2002 PZ_{1} | 5 August 2002 | list |
| (166951) 2003 KB_{4} | 23 May 2003 | list |
| (166963) 2003 NN_{2} | 3 July 2003 | list |
| (166973) 2003 OV_{5} | 24 July 2003 | list |
| (166976) 2003 OW_{10} | 27 July 2003 | list |
| (166978) 2003 OJ_{13} | 28 July 2003 | list |
| (168013) 2005 HK_{4} | 30 April 2005 | list |
| (168192) 2006 JZ | 3 May 2006 | list |
| (168202) 2006 JP_{26} | 5 May 2006 | list |
| (168269) 2007 PS_{1} | 5 August 2007 | list |
| (168272) 2007 PY_{7} | 10 August 2007 | list |
| (169632) 2002 HG_{6} | 19 April 2002 | list |
| (169758) 2002 PF_{34} | 7 August 2002 | list |
| (170186) 2003 NS_{6} | 6 July 2003 | list |
| (170196) 2003 OM_{8} | 26 July 2003 | list |
| (170875) 2004 HD_{39} | 25 April 2004 | list |
| (171240) 2005 KA_{11} | 31 May 2005 | list |
| (171243) 2005 LP_{8} | 5 June 2005 | list |
| (171314) 2006 HL_{51} | 24 April 2006 | list |
| (171326) 2006 JA_{1} | 3 May 2006 | list |
| (171374) 2006 NE | 1 July 2006 | list |
| (172126) 2002 HV_{4} | 18 April 2002 | list |
| (172422) 2003 OW_{13} | 28 July 2003 | list |

| (172424) 2003 OU_{17} | 29 July 2003 | list |
| (172451) 2003 QV_{79} | 24 August 2003 | list |
| (172931) 2005 HA_{4} | 28 April 2005 | list |
| (172933) 2005 JH | 2 May 2005 | list |
| (172967) 2005 NK_{55} | 6 July 2005 | list |
| (172968) 2005 NQ_{80} | 14 July 2005 | list |
| (173246) 1999 MP | 20 June 1999 | list |
| (174150) 2002 PD | 1 August 2002 | list |
| (175065) 2004 GA_{15} | 12 April 2004 | list |
| (175285) 2005 LX_{3} | 3 June 2005 | list |
| (175335) 2005 NL_{39} | 7 July 2005 | list |
| (177713) 2005 GZ_{140} | 14 April 2005 | list |
| (177782) 2005 LG_{1} | 3 June 2005 | list |
| (177841) 2005 ND_{80} | 10 July 2005 | list |
| (177958) 2006 PX_{3} | 14 August 2006 | list |
| (178404) 1998 QB_{4} | 17 August 1998 | list |
| (178406) 1998 QP_{26} | 24 August 1998 | list |
| (180695) 2004 HA_{31} | 21 April 2004 | list |
| (180752) 2004 NF | 8 July 2004 | list |
| (180760) 2004 OV_{5} | 18 July 2004 | list |
| (180909) 2005 KA_{10} | 30 May 2005 | list |
| (180910) 2005 KB_{11} | 31 May 2005 | list |
| (180993) 2005 NQ_{20} | 2 July 2005 | list |
| (180999) 2005 NE_{39} | 6 July 2005 | list |
| (181000) 2005 NH_{39} | 6 July 2005 | list |

| (181025) 2005 OU_{3} | 28 July 2005 | list |
| (181048) 2005 PS_{3} | 6 August 2005 | list |
| (181050) 2005 PB_{5} | 2 August 2005 | list |
| (181051) 2005 PC_{5} | 6 August 2005 | list |
| (181111) 2005 QJ_{88} | 24 August 2005 | list |
| (181288) 2006 OW_{14} | 20 July 2006 | list |
| (183565) 2003 NL_{2} | 3 July 2003 | list |
| (183567) 2003 OZ_{10} | 27 July 2003 | list |
| (184109) 2004 HZ_{30} | 21 April 2004 | list |
| (184122) 2004 HG_{62} | 30 April 2004 | list |
| (184130) 2004 JT_{12} | 13 May 2004 | list |
| (184151) 2004 KY | 17 May 2004 | list |
| (184170) 2004 MX_{1} | 18 June 2004 | list |
| (184186) 2004 PZ_{1} | 6 August 2004 | list |
| (184376) 2005 KS_{9} | 28 May 2005 | list |
| (184379) 2005 LL_{8} | 3 June 2005 | list |
| (184380) 2005 LN_{8} | 4 June 2005 | list |
| (184433) 2005 NT_{20} | 2 July 2005 | list |
| (184449) 2005 NL_{55} | 7 July 2005 | list |
| (184458) 2005 NW_{79} | 10 July 2005 | list |
| (184459) 2005 NH_{80} | 10 July 2005 | list |
| (184460) 2005 NN_{80} | 13 July 2005 | list |
| (184461) 2005 NR_{80} | 14 July 2005 | list |
| (184476) 2005 OZ_{1} | 26 July 2005 | list |
| (184477) 2005 OD_{2} | 26 July 2005 | list |

| (184483) 2005 OX_{14} | 27 July 2005 | list |
| (184502) 2005 PM_{6} | 9 August 2005 | list |
| (186645) 2003 NW_{8} | 10 July 2003 | list |
| (186844) 2004 GA_{1} | 11 April 2004 | list |
| (186920) 2004 PM_{27} | 9 August 2004 | list |
| (186935) 2004 PV_{104} | 15 August 2004 | list |
| (187083) 2005 NZ_{82} | 14 July 2005 | list |
| (187089) 2005 PE_{5} | 7 August 2005 | list |
| (187274) 2005 TV_{45} | 7 October 2005 | list |
| (188500) 2004 PA_{98} | 14 August 2004 | list |
| (188589) 2005 NG_{39} | 6 July 2005 | list |
| (188598) 2005 OF_{15} | 29 July 2005 | list |
| (188606) 2005 PH_{18} | 10 August 2005 | list |
| (189194) 2003 LX_{1} | 1 June 2003 | list |
| (189200) 2003 RS_{7} | 4 September 2003 | list |
| (189858) 2003 HX_{1} | 23 April 2003 | list |
| (190010) 2004 MM_{7} | 27 June 2004 | list |
| (190016) 2004 OT_{9} | 20 July 2004 | list |
| (191324) 2003 KA_{4} | 23 May 2003 | list |
| (191369) 2003 RR_{7} | 3 September 2003 | list |
| (191625) 2004 NO_{3} | 12 July 2004 | list |
| (191633) 2004 OB_{12} | 17 July 2004 | list |
| (191916) 2005 OJ_{2} | 28 July 2005 | list |
| (195643) 2002 NN_{29} | 14 July 2002 | list |
| (196460) 2003 HF_{53} | 30 April 2003 | list |

| (196479) 2003 KU | 21 May 2003 | list |
| (196482) 2003 KW_{3} | 23 May 2003 | list |
| (196484) 2003 KK_{9} | 24 May 2003 | list |
| (196497) 2003 LZ_{3} | 5 June 2003 | list |
| (196500) 2003 LW_{6} | 7 June 2003 | list |
| (196501) 2003 LX_{6} | 7 June 2003 | list |
| (196513) 2003 NA_{5} | 4 July 2003 | list |
| (196517) 2003 OP | 20 July 2003 | list |
| (196527) 2003 OZ_{17} | 30 July 2003 | list |
| (196532) 2003 OY_{20} | 31 July 2003 | list |
| (196555) 2003 QU_{9} | 20 August 2003 | list |
| (196601) 2003 QY_{68} | 25 August 2003 | list |
| (197639) 2004 LJ_{2} | 10 June 2004 | list |
| (197651) 2004 MW_{1} | 17 June 2004 | list |
| (197652) 2004 MW_{6} | 25 June 2004 | list |
| (197661) 2004 NN_{3} | 12 July 2004 | list |
| (197693) 2004 OF_{4} | 17 July 2004 | list |
| (197703) 2004 OL_{9} | 19 July 2004 | list |
| (197704) 2004 OQ_{9} | 20 July 2004 | list |
| (197709) 2004 PE_{2} | 6 August 2004 | list |
| (197742) 2004 PD_{27} | 8 August 2004 | list |
| (197743) 2004 PN_{27} | 9 August 2004 | list |
| (197834) 2004 PR_{95} | 13 August 2004 | list |
| (197847) 2004 QJ_{2} | 19 August 2004 | list |
| (197849) 2004 QG_{3} | 20 August 2004 | list |

| (197850) 2004 QL_{3} | 21 August 2004 | list |
| (197851) 2004 QB_{5} | 21 August 2004 | list |
| (197852) 2004 QZ_{6} | 21 August 2004 | list |
| (197853) 2004 QA_{7} | 22 August 2004 | list |
| (199764) 2006 KN_{1} | 20 May 2006 | list |
| (200004) 2007 KY_{6} | 23 May 2007 | list |
| (200364) 2000 QA_{26} | 23 August 2000 | list |
| (200557) 2001 KH_{42} | 24 May 2001 | list |
| (200566) 2001 OT_{63} | 27 July 2001 | list |
| (201491) 2003 HG_{53} | 30 April 2003 | list |
| (201498) 2003 KN_{9} | 25 May 2003 | list |
| (201499) 2003 KV_{18} | 26 May 2003 | list |
| (201504) 2003 MW_{9} | 28 June 2003 | list |
| (201510) 2003 OT_{5} | 24 July 2003 | list |
| (202728) 2007 JU_{9} | 9 May 2007 | list |
| (202745) 2007 ND | 6 July 2007 | list |
| (202746) 2007 NO | 8 July 2007 | list |
| (202747) 2007 OU_{1} | 18 July 2007 | list |
| (202789) 2008 PU_{11} | 9 August 2008 | list |
| (202792) 2008 QB_{6} | 25 August 2008 | list |
| (203919) 2003 OV_{10} | 27 July 2003 | list |
| (203920) 2003 OH_{13} | 27 July 2003 | list |
| (203923) 2003 OP_{20} | 31 July 2003 | list |
| (204291) 2004 PH_{27} | 8 August 2004 | list |
| (204306) 2004 PE_{98} | 15 August 2004 | list |

| (204819) 2007 PU_{1} | 6 August 2007 | list |
| (204820) 2007 PY_{2} | 7 August 2007 | list |
| (206324) 2003 ON | 17 July 2003 | list |
| (206331) 2003 OK_{8} | 26 July 2003 | list |
| (206334) 2003 ON_{20} | 31 July 2003 | list |
| (207487) 2006 HS_{51} | 26 April 2006 | list |
| (207488) 2006 HV_{51} | 26 April 2006 | list |
| (207559) 2006 OQ_{1} | 17 July 2006 | list |
| (207654) 2007 OF_{7} | 24 July 2007 | list |
| (207658) 2007 PY | 4 August 2007 | list |
| (207659) 2007 PV_{1} | 6 August 2007 | list |
| (207663) 2007 PV_{7} | 9 August 2007 | list |
| (207664) 2007 PJ_{8} | 10 August 2007 | list |
| (207665) 2007 PK_{8} | 10 August 2007 | list |
| (209035) 2003 NJ_{1} | 2 July 2003 | list |
| (209041) 2003 OV_{17} | 29 July 2003 | list |
| (209045) 2003 PH_{4} | 2 August 2003 | list |
| (209049) 2003 QW_{9} | 20 August 2003 | list |
| (209785) 2005 GQ_{8} | 1 April 2005 | list |
| (209887) 2005 LB_{1} | 1 June 2005 | list |
| (209916) 2005 PJ_{18} | 10 August 2005 | list |
| (209994) 2006 JL | 1 May 2006 | list |
| (210033) 2006 OT_{1} | 17 July 2006 | list |
| (210511) 1998 OX_{11} | 22 July 1998 | list |
| (211199) 2002 NL_{7} | 12 July 2002 | list |

| (211492) 2003 NE_{7} | 7 July 2003 | list |
| (211911) 2004 QX_{6} | 21 August 2004 | list |
| (212404) 2006 KO_{1} | 20 May 2006 | list |
| (212406) 2006 KJ_{23} | 23 May 2006 | list |
| (212428) 2006 OX_{1} | 18 July 2006 | list |
| (212434) 2006 OA_{16} | 29 July 2006 | list |
| (212450) 2006 QO | 16 August 2006 | list |
| (213604) 2002 PU_{86} | 13 August 2002 | list |
| (214084) 2004 HJ_{62} | 30 April 2004 | list |
| (214100) 2004 OY_{5} | 18 July 2004 | list |
| (214342) 2005 JK_{109} | 14 May 2005 | list |
| (214362) 2005 KW_{9} | 30 May 2005 | list |
| (214398) 2005 NX_{20} | 6 July 2005 | list |
| (214410) 2005 OG_{2} | 27 July 2005 | list |
| (214561) 2006 QU_{5} | 18 August 2006 | list |
| (215428) 2002 JB_{61} | 10 May 2002 | list |
| (215599) 2003 RN_{1} | 2 September 2003 | list |
| (215797) 2004 OV | 16 July 2004 | list |
| (215798) 2004 OZ_{9} | 21 July 2004 | list |
| (215799) 2004 OK_{10} | 21 July 2004 | list |
| (215800) 2004 PS_{27} | 9 August 2004 | list |
| (215937) 2005 KW_{10} | 31 May 2005 | list |
| (215955) 2005 NF_{39} | 6 July 2005 | list |
| (215963) 2005 PK_{18} | 11 August 2005 | list |
| (216050) 2006 OA_{15} | 26 July 2006 | list |

| (216696) 2004 QB_{7} | 22 August 2004 | list |
| (216749) 2005 NR_{39} | 7 July 2005 | list |
| (217403) 2005 JG | 2 May 2005 | list |
| (217416) 2005 PW_{3} | 6 August 2005 | list |
| (218359) 2004 GC_{15} | 12 April 2004 | list |
| (218368) 2004 JS_{1} | 10 May 2004 | list |
| (218399) 2004 QF_{5} | 21 August 2004 | list |
| (218583) 2005 KD | 16 May 2005 | list |
| (218585) 2005 KE_{10} | 28 May 2005 | list |
| (218604) 2005 NB_{80} | 10 July 2005 | list |
| (218620) 2005 QK_{88} | 24 August 2005 | list |
| (220341) 2003 GY_{20} | 5 April 2003 | list |
| (220367) 2003 OO_{8} | 26 July 2003 | list |
| (220382) 2003 QD_{30} | 20 August 2003 | list |
| (220575) 2004 HF_{62} | 23 April 2004 | list |
| (220594) 2004 NQ_{4} | 12 July 2004 | list |
| (220603) 2004 OX_{9} | 20 July 2004 | list |
| (220631) 2004 QH_{5} | 21 August 2004 | list |
| (221006) 2005 OH_{2} | 27 July 2005 | list |
| (223620) 2004 JX_{12} | 13 May 2004 | list |
| (223647) 2004 MK_{7} | 27 June 2004 | list |
| (223649) 2004 NW_{8} | 14 July 2004 | list |
| (223683) 2004 PA_{93} | 11 August 2004 | list |
| (224034) 2005 LD_{48} | 10 June 2005 | list |
| (224075) 2005 NP_{55} | 9 July 2005 | list |

| (224082) 2005 NE_{80} | 10 July 2005 | list |
| (224083) 2005 NL_{80} | 13 July 2005 | list |
| (224098) 2005 OG_{15} | 29 July 2005 | list |
| (224110) 2005 PV_{3} | 6 August 2005 | list |
| (224115) 2005 PN_{18} | 11 August 2005 | list |
| (226388) 2003 OS_{20} | 31 July 2003 | list |
| (226421) 2003 RU_{7} | 4 September 2003 | list |
| (226701) 2004 NP_{3} | 12 July 2004 | list |
| (226712) 2004 PG_{1} | 6 August 2004 | list |
| (226730) 2004 PB_{93} | 11 August 2004 | list |
| (227113) 2005 NM_{55} | 7 July 2005 | list |
| (227124) 2005 OE_{2} | 26 July 2005 | list |
| (227125) 2005 ON_{3} | 26 July 2005 | list |
| (227137) 2005 OE_{15} | 29 July 2005 | list |
| (227138) 2005 OH_{15} | 30 July 2005 | list |
| (228425) 2001 PU_{28} | 15 August 2001 | list |
| (228875) 2003 KX_{3} | 23 May 2003 | list |
| (228882) 2003 OW_{17} | 29 July 2003 | list |
| (229095) 2004 QC_{7} | 22 August 2004 | list |
| (229769) 2008 JX_{19} | 6 May 2008 | list |
| (230810) 2004 HJ_{12} | 20 April 2004 | list |
| (230823) 2004 MR_{4} | 21 June 2004 | list |
| (231380) 2006 JJ | 1 May 2006 | list |
| (232755) 2004 NM_{3} | 12 July 2004 | list |
| (232780) 2004 PD_{98} | 15 August 2004 | list |

| (232783) 2004 QF_{3} | 20 August 2004 | list |
| (233555) 2007 NT_{3} | 12 July 2007 | list |
| (233556) 2007 NX_{3} | 13 July 2007 | list |
| (233557) 2007 NA_{5} | 15 July 2007 | list |
| (233560) 2007 PZ | 4 August 2007 | list |
| (233563) 2007 PM_{6} | 7 August 2007 | list |
| (234070) 1999 PV_{1} | 9 August 1999 | list |
| (234169) 2000 LR | 2 June 2000 | list |
| (235105) 2003 NW_{4} | 4 July 2003 | list |
| (235139) 2003 QC_{69} | 26 August 2003 | list |
| (235153) 2003 RP_{1} | 2 September 2003 | list |
| (235585) 2004 PY_{1} | 6 August 2004 | list |
| (236086) 2005 KW_{11} | 29 May 2005 | list |
| (236491) 2006 GE_{2} | 2 April 2006 | list |
| (236549) 2006 HD_{51} | 24 April 2006 | list |
| (236550) 2006 HP_{51} | 26 April 2006 | list |
| (236621) 2006 KX_{1} | 21 May 2006 | list |
| (236662) 2006 LJ | 1 June 2006 | list |
| (236667) 2006 OG_{16} | 29 July 2006 | list |
| (236766) 2007 OB_{3} | 20 July 2007 | list |
| (236768) 2007 OJ_{6} | 18 July 2007 | list |
| (236769) 2007 OR_{6} | 21 July 2007 | list |
| (236771) 2007 PU | 4 August 2007 | list |
| (238120) 2003 OV_{20} | 31 July 2003 | list |
| (238140) 2003 RT_{7} | 4 September 2003 | list |

| (238790) 2005 KY_{9} | 30 May 2005 | list |
| (238806) 2005 MQ_{1} | 16 June 2005 | list |
| (239195) 2006 LN | 1 June 2006 | list |
| (239281) 2007 OL_{6} | 20 July 2007 | list |
| (240152) 2002 NX_{16} | 13 July 2002 | list |
| (240328) 2003 MJ_{10} | 29 June 2003 | list |
| (240329) 2003 NV_{4} | 4 July 2003 | list |
| (240927) 2006 FB_{10} | 26 March 2006 | list |
| (240972) 2006 JK_{26} | 4 May 2006 | list |
| (240983) 2006 KW_{1} | 20 May 2006 | list |
| (241987) 2002 LB_{47} | 14 June 2002 | list |
| (242002) 2002 PX_{1} | 4 August 2002 | list |
| (242186) 2003 KO_{9} | 25 May 2003 | list |
| (242445) 2004 PP_{95} | 12 August 2004 | list |
| (243733) 2000 LZ_{1} | 4 June 2000 | list |
| (244663) 2003 HH_{53} | 30 April 2003 | list |
| (244675) 2003 NC_{7} | 7 July 2003 | list |
| (244679) 2003 OC_{8} | 25 July 2003 | list |
| (244681) 2003 OY_{17} | 30 July 2003 | list |
| (245077) 2004 JV_{1} | 10 May 2004 | list |
| (245096) 2004 PF_{27} | 8 August 2004 | list |
| (245482) 2005 OP_{3} | 28 July 2005 | list |
| (245487) 2005 PL_{18} | 11 August 2005 | list |
| (245812) 2006 JM | 1 May 2006 | list |
| (245861) 2006 OD_{15} | 29 July 2006 | list |

| (246141) 2007 PV | 4 August 2007 | list |
| (247473) 2002 JZ_{67} | 12 May 2002 | list |
| (247740) 2003 LY_{3} | 5 June 2003 | list |
| (247747) 2003 OT_{10} | 27 July 2003 | list |
| (247753) 2003 PE | 1 August 2003 | list |
| (248054) 2004 KV_{17} | 27 May 2004 | list |
| (248062) 2004 MV_{6} | 25 June 2004 | list |
| (248066) 2004 OA_{10} | 21 July 2004 | list |
| (248290) 2005 KU_{9} | 29 May 2005 | list |
| (248292) 2005 KV_{11} | 28 May 2005 | list |
| (248295) 2005 LY_{3} | 4 June 2005 | list |
| (248303) 2005 LC_{48} | 5 June 2005 | list |
| (248319) 2005 PJ_{6} | 7 August 2005 | list |
| (248637) 2006 GD_{2} | 2 April 2006 | list |
| (250287) 2003 OO_{13} | 28 July 2003 | list |
| (250513) 2004 MY_{4} | 22 June 2004 | list |
| (250674) 2005 OV_{22} | 29 July 2005 | list |
| (250676) 2005 PU_{3} | 6 August 2005 | list |
| (253366) 2003 GA_{30} | 8 April 2003 | list |
| (253384) 2003 KQ_{3} | 22 May 2003 | list |
| (253397) 2003 OS_{8} | 26 July 2003 | list |
| (253407) 2003 QV_{9} | 20 August 2003 | list |
| (253413) 2003 QF_{30} | 22 August 2003 | list |
| (254080) 2004 JW_{1} | 10 May 2004 | list |
| (254096) 2004 KC | 16 May 2004 | list |

| (254097) 2004 KE | 16 May 2004 | list |
| (254104) 2004 LC_{10} | 14 June 2004 | list |
| (254119) 2004 ON_{9} | 20 July 2004 | list |
| (254123) 2004 PR_{1} | 6 August 2004 | list |
| (254165) 2004 QG_{2} | 19 August 2004 | list |
| (254657) 2005 KG | 17 May 2005 | list |
| (254665) 2005 LZ_{3} | 4 June 2005 | list |
| (254717) 2005 NO_{39} | 7 July 2005 | list |
| (254729) 2005 NZ_{79} | 10 July 2005 | list |
| (255550) 2006 JB_{26} | 2 May 2006 | list |
| (255586) 2006 OU_{1} | 17 July 2006 | list |
| (255595) 2006 OB_{15} | 26 July 2006 | list |
| (255596) 2006 OD_{16} | 20 July 2006 | list |
| (255600) 2006 PC_{4} | 15 August 2006 | list |
| (255601) 2006 PD_{4} | 15 August 2006 | list |
| (259390) 2003 NG_{7} | 7 July 2003 | list |
| (260078) 2004 JV_{12} | 13 May 2004 | list |
| (260116) 2004 PK_{27} | 8 August 2004 | list |
| (260132) 2004 PT_{95} | 13 August 2004 | list |
| (260745) 2005 MN_{1} | 16 June 2005 | list |
| (260783) 2005 NP_{39} | 7 July 2005 | list |
| (260796) 2005 NP_{79} | 9 July 2005 | list |
| (260810) 2005 OR_{3} | 28 July 2005 | list |
| (261865) 2006 FF_{10} | 26 March 2006 | list |
| (261894) 2006 HK_{51} | 24 April 2006 | list |

| (261895) 2006 HM_{51} | 24 April 2006 | list |
| (261896) 2006 HU_{51} | 26 April 2006 | list |
| (261917) 2006 KH_{23} | 23 May 2006 | list |
| (261918) 2006 KL_{23} | 23 May 2006 | list |
| (261926) 2006 KL_{100} | 29 May 2006 | list |
| (261945) 2006 OF_{16} | 26 July 2006 | list |
| (261976) 2006 QJ_{10} | 19 August 2006 | list |
| (264804) 2002 PY_{1} | 4 August 2002 | list |
| (265049) 2003 QA_{80} | 27 August 2003 | list |
| (265053) 2003 RF_{2} | 2 September 2003 | list |
| (265319) 2004 NV_{8} | 14 July 2004 | list |
| (265528) 2005 NZ_{20} | 6 July 2005 | list |
| (265537) 2005 NO_{79} | 7 July 2005 | list |
| (265538) 2005 NB_{83} | 15 July 2005 | list |
| (265543) 2005 OM_{3} | 26 July 2005 | list |
| (265549) 2005 OZ_{14} | 28 July 2005 | list |
| (266614) 2008 OV_{10} | 30 July 2008 | list |
| (267176) 2000 OO | 23 July 2000 | list |
| (268257) 2005 NA_{21} | 6 July 2005 | list |
| (268274) 2005 PH_{6} | 7 August 2005 | list |
| (268714) 2006 HN_{51} | 24 April 2006 | list |
| (269118) 2007 LH_{15} | 12 June 2007 | list |
| (270627) 2002 PE_{34} | 7 August 2002 | list |
| (271582) 2004 MZ_{4} | 22 June 2004 | list |
| (271583) 2004 MU_{6} | 25 June 2004 | list |

| (271589) 2004 NA_{9} | 14 July 2004 | list |
| (271600) 2004 OX_{5} | 18 July 2004 | list |
| (271601) 2004 OC_{6} | 18 July 2004 | list |
| (271602) 2004 OV_{9} | 19 July 2004 | list |
| (271613) 2004 PQ_{27} | 9 August 2004 | list |
| (271641) 2004 PF_{98} | 15 August 2004 | list |
| (272145) 2005 NB_{21} | 6 July 2005 | list |
| (272168) 2005 OS_{3} | 28 July 2005 | list |
| (273261) 2006 KK_{118} | 29 May 2006 | list |
| (273271) 2006 OP | 17 July 2006 | list |
| (273977) 2007 LE_{15} | 9 June 2007 | list |
| (274269) 2008 PM_{11} | 8 August 2008 | list |
| (274270) 2008 PP_{11} | 9 August 2008 | list |
| (274276) 2008 PA_{16} | 8 August 2008 | list |
| (276485) 2003 OR_{20} | 31 July 2003 | list |
| (276490) 2003 PK_{11} | 2 August 2003 | list |
| (276797) 2004 OW_{5} | 18 July 2004 | list |
| (276798) 2004 OA_{12} | 16 July 2004 | list |
| (276799) 2004 OD_{12} | 21 July 2004 | list |
| (276832) 2004 QC_{5} | 21 August 2004 | list |
| (277139) 2005 KN_{9} | 28 May 2005 | list |
| (277173) 2005 OY_{1} | 16 July 2005 | list |
| (277177) 2005 OU_{22} | 29 July 2005 | list |
| (277923) 2006 KN_{103} | 29 May 2006 | list |
| (277945) 2006 QR_{5} | 16 August 2006 | list |

| (277948) 2006 QF_{144} | 25 August 2006 | list |
| (278388) 2007 OV_{1} | 18 July 2007 | list |
| (278579) 2008 HC_{66} | 28 April 2008 | list |
| (278601) 2008 PV_{2} | 2 August 2008 | list |
| (278607) 2008 PS_{11} | 9 August 2008 | list |
| (278608) 2008 PZ_{15} | 8 August 2008 | list |
| (280295) 2003 OR_{8} | 26 July 2003 | list |
| (280303) 2003 QJ_{30} | 24 August 2003 | list |
| (280501) 2004 OB_{10} | 21 July 2004 | list |
| (280512) 2004 PE_{27} | 8 August 2004 | list |
| (280741) 2005 LC_{1} | 1 June 2005 | list |
| (281043) 2006 HO_{51} | 26 April 2006 | list |
| (281254) 2007 PT | 4 August 2007 | list |
| (281389) 2008 QA_{6} | 25 August 2008 | list |
| (282366) 2003 OO_{10} | 27 July 2003 | list |
| (282756) 2006 HX_{17} | 21 April 2006 | list |
| (282771) 2006 JF_{26} | 3 May 2006 | list |
| (283061) 2008 QZ_{5} | 25 August 2008 | list |
| (283270) 2011 HS_{12} | 7 July 2007 | list |
| (283779) 2003 QA_{10} | 20 August 2003 | list |
| (283926) 2004 NT_{8} | 14 July 2004 | list |
| (283929) 2004 PA_{2} | 6 August 2004 | list |
| (284086) 2005 LA_{1} | 1 June 2005 | list |
| (284294) 2006 KK_{100} | 29 May 2006 | list |
| (284302) 2006 OK_{15} | 30 July 2006 | list |

| (284306) 2006 QO_{5} | 16 August 2006 | list |
| (287659) 2003 MV_{9} | 28 June 2003 | list |
| (287661) 2003 NZ_{4} | 4 July 2003 | list |
| (287662) 2003 NW_{6} | 7 July 2003 | list |
| (287667) 2003 OH_{8} | 26 July 2003 | list |
| (287668) 2003 OQ_{8} | 26 July 2003 | list |
| (287670) 2003 OT_{20} | 31 July 2003 | list |
| (287710) 2003 QB_{69} | 26 August 2003 | list |
| (288555) 2004 GY_{73} | 15 April 2004 | list |
| (288584) 2004 JT_{1} | 10 May 2004 | list |
| (288624) 2004 OY_{9} | 20 July 2004 | list |
| (288636) 2004 PU_{27} | 9 August 2004 | list |
| (288646) 2004 PV_{42} | 9 August 2004 | list |
| (288684) 2004 PC_{98} | 14 August 2004 | list |
| (289713) 2005 JE | 2 May 2005 | list |
| (289847) 2005 LF_{48} | 10 June 2005 | list |
| (291652) 2006 HE_{51} | 24 April 2006 | list |
| (291718) 2006 JN_{26} | 4 May 2006 | list |
| (291848) 2006 OY_{1} | 18 July 2006 | list |
| (291856) 2006 OV_{14} | 20 July 2006 | list |
| (291857) 2006 OY_{15} | 29 July 2006 | list |
| (291864) 2006 PH_{4} | 15 August 2006 | list |
| (291906) 2006 QK_{10} | 19 August 2006 | list |
| (291937) 2006 QD_{31} | 22 August 2006 | list |
| (292014) 2006 QH_{144} | 26 August 2006 | list |

| (293608) 2007 KZ_{6} | 23 May 2007 | list |
| (293628) 2007 NE_{1} | 9 July 2007 | list |
| (293630) 2007 NR_{3} | 10 July 2007 | list |
| (293636) 2007 OP_{6} | 21 July 2007 | list |
| (293637) 2007 OQ_{6} | 21 July 2007 | list |
| (293639) 2007 OU_{7} | 25 July 2007 | list |
| (293647) 2007 PU_{2} | 7 August 2007 | list |
| (293648) 2007 PX_{2} | 7 August 2007 | list |
| (293674) 2007 PC_{25} | 9 August 2007 | list |
| (298774) 2004 PH_{1} | 6 August 2004 | list |
| (298794) 2004 QH_{3} | 20 August 2004 | list |
| (299270) 2005 NW_{82} | 10 July 2005 | list |
| (299278) 2005 OD | 16 July 2005 | list |
| (299651) 2006 KO_{103} | 29 May 2006 | list |
| (299664) 2006 PS_{4} | 15 August 2006 | list |
| (300292) 2007 PK_{6} | 6 August 2007 | list |
| (300293) 2007 PN_{6} | 7 August 2007 | list |
| (302884) 2003 MH | 19 June 2003 | list |
| (303195) 2004 GB_{15} | 12 April 2004 | list |
| (303218) 2004 KX | 17 May 2004 | list |
| (304098) 2006 HT_{51} | 26 April 2006 | list |
| (304176) 2006 QP_{5} | 16 August 2006 | list |
| (304787) 2007 NF_{1} | 11 July 2007 | list |
| (304789) 2007 NS_{3} | 12 July 2007 | list |
| (304794) 2007 PW_{2} | 7 August 2007 | list |

| (304798) 2007 PF_{8} | 6 August 2007 | list |
| (307593) 2003 NB_{5} | 5 July 2003 | list |
| (308307) 2005 KT_{9} | 29 May 2005 | list |
| (308698) 2006 FZ_{9} | 26 March 2006 | list |
| (308792) 2006 QA_{40} | 19 August 2006 | list |
| (309218) 2007 OE_{7} | 24 July 2007 | list |
| (310452) 2000 QT_{6} | 23 August 2000 | list |
| (310880) 2003 OS_{17} | 29 July 2003 | list |
| (311150) 2004 RB_{339} | 11 September 2004 | list |
| (311332) 2005 OY | 16 July 2005 | list |
| (311609) 2006 OC_{16} | 30 July 2006 | list |
| (311619) 2006 QV_{5} | 18 August 2006 | list |
| (312002) 2007 PL_{6} | 6 August 2007 | list |
| (312751) 2010 TG_{92} | 24 April 2006 | list |
| (313177) 2001 OB_{3} | 19 July 2001 | list |
| (313187) 2001 QK_{2} | 17 August 2001 | list |
| (313594) 2003 NB_{7} | 6 July 2003 | list |
| (313596) 2003 OB_{8} | 25 July 2003 | list |
| (313597) 2003 ON_{8} | 26 July 2003 | list |
| (313598) 2003 OU_{10} | 27 July 2003 | list |
| (313607) 2003 QL_{30} | 24 August 2003 | list |
| (313900) 2004 ND_{3} | 12 July 2004 | list |
| (314231) 2005 PX_{3} | 6 August 2005 | list |
| (314637) 2006 JK | 1 May 2006 | list |
| (314638) 2006 JQ_{26} | 5 May 2006 | list |

| (317006) 2001 QK | 16 August 2001 | list |
| (317679) 2003 KT | 20 May 2003 | list |
| (317680) 2003 KU_{3} | 22 May 2003 | list |
| (317688) 2003 OD_{8} | 25 July 2003 | list |
| (317731) 2003 RO_{1} | 2 September 2003 | list |
| (318112) 2004 JU_{12} | 13 May 2004 | list |
| (318123) 2004 LD_{10} | 14 June 2004 | list |
| (318132) 2004 ON_{10} | 21 July 2004 | list |
| (318133) 2004 PF_{2} | 7 August 2004 | list |
| (318663) 2005 NN_{55} | 7 July 2005 | list |
| (321035) 2008 PZ_{16} | 7 August 2008 | list |
| (322433) 2011 SE_{220} | 7 July 2007 | list |
| (323449) 2004 HY_{30} | 21 April 2004 | list |
| (323754) 2005 OV_{3} | 28 July 2005 | list |
| (323765) 2005 PM_{18} | 11 August 2005 | list |
| (324344) 2006 QH_{10} | 19 August 2006 | list |
| (327642) 2006 QF_{10} | 18 August 2006 | list |
| (327643) 2006 QG_{10} | 18 August 2006 | list |
| (329618) 2003 ON_{21} | 29 July 2003 | list |
| (329934) 2005 OY_{14} | 27 July 2005 | list |
| (330225) 2006 JL_{26} | 4 May 2006 | list |
| (331797) 2003 ON_{17} | 28 July 2003 | list |
| (332252) 2006 KP_{103} | 30 May 2006 | list |
| (332907) 2011 BP_{78} | 17 May 2004 | list |
| (333162) 2012 BP_{143} | 24 June 2006 | list |

| (333457) 2004 PF_{1} | 6 August 2004 | list |
| (333461) 2004 PD_{93} | 12 August 2004 | list |
| (333516) 2005 NV_{82} | 10 July 2005 | list |
| (334723) 2003 KZ_{3} | 23 May 2003 | list |
| (334754) 2003 RH_{2} | 3 September 2003 | list |
| (335247) 2005 LZ | 1 June 2005 | list |
| (335626) 2006 HC_{51} | 24 April 2006 | list |
| (335654) 2006 PY_{3} | 14 August 2006 | list |
| (336131) 2008 PH_{11} | 7 August 2008 | list |
| (338528) 2003 RG_{2} | 3 September 2003 | list |
| (339050) 2004 MC_{3} | 20 June 2004 | list |
| (339052) 2004 NH | 8 July 2004 | list |
| (339056) 2004 OW | 16 July 2004 | list |
| (339607) 2005 OW_{3} | 28 July 2005 | list |
| (340414) 2006 FC_{10} | 26 March 2006 | list |
| (340415) 2006 FD_{10} | 26 March 2006 | list |
| (340519) 2006 JC_{26} | 3 May 2006 | list |
| (341107) 2007 KA_{7} | 23 May 2007 | list |
| (344876) 2004 OZ_{5} | 18 July 2004 | list |
| (345532) 2006 PF_{4} | 15 August 2006 | list |
| (345835) 2007 KB_{7} | 24 May 2007 | list |
| (347952) 2003 PK_{4} | 2 August 2003 | list |
| (348178) 2004 OW_{9} | 20 July 2004 | list |
| (348795) 2006 QL_{10} | 19 August 2006 | list |
| (349504) 2008 PQ_{11} | 9 August 2008 | list |

| (350993) 2003 GH_{42} | 9 April 2003 | list |
| (351215) 2004 NQ_{3} | 12 July 2004 | list |
| (351219) 2004 OR_{9} | 20 July 2004 | list |
| (351220) 2004 PH_{2} | 7 August 2004 | list |
| (351225) 2004 PT_{27} | 9 August 2004 | list |
| (352149) 2007 PU_{7} | 7 August 2007 | list |
| (354679) 2005 OQ_{3} | 28 July 2005 | list |
| (355262) 2007 OC_{7} | 24 July 2007 | list |
| (356512) 2011 ST_{60} | 7 July 2007 | list |
| (357336) 2003 OT_{17} | 29 July 2003 | list |
| (357365) 2003 SH_{158} | 22 September 2003 | list |
| (357648) 2005 GF_{154} | 15 April 2005 | list |
| (358084) 2006 JD_{26} | 3 May 2006 | list |
| (358085) 2006 JG_{26} | 3 May 2006 | list |
| (360649) 2004 OA_{6} | 18 July 2004 | list |
| (360651) 2004 QY_{6} | 21 August 2004 | list |
| (360870) 2005 SK | 20 September 2005 | list |
| (361164) 2006 KK_{23} | 23 May 2006 | list |
| (363405) 2003 OL_{13} | 28 July 2003 | list |
| (366837) 2005 OO_{3} | 27 July 2005 | list |
| (371360) 2006 PK_{4} | 15 August 2006 | list |
| (374649) 2006 JS_{26} | 5 May 2006 | list |
| (375053) 2007 NW_{4} | 13 July 2007 | list |
| (377135) 2003 KR_{3} | 22 May 2003 | list |
| (377315) 2004 HB_{31} | 22 April 2004 | list |

| (377331) 2004 OF_{10} | 21 July 2004 | list |
| (380549) 2004 OJ_{4} | 17 July 2004 | list |
| (380550) 2004 OT_{5} | 16 July 2004 | list |
| (380551) 2004 OO_{9} | 20 July 2004 | list |
| (380715) 2005 OC_{15} | 28 July 2005 | list |
| (381188) 2007 OK_{6} | 20 July 2007 | list |
| (382014) 2011 BQ_{11} | 12 July 2004 | list |
| (382176) 2012 JR_{25} | 11 August 2004 | list |
| (382887) 2004 PJ_{27} | 8 August 2004 | list |
| (386088) 2007 OD_{7} | 24 July 2007 | list |
| (386091) 2007 PV_{2} | 7 August 2007 | list |
| (387849) 2004 PS_{1} | 6 August 2004 | list |
| (387856) 2004 PU_{97} | 14 August 2004 | list |
| (387976) 2005 LM_{8} | 4 June 2005 | list |
| (388226) 2006 JT_{26} | 5 May 2006 | list |
| (390821) 2004 MW_{4} | 22 June 2004 | list |
| (393482) 2002 PQ_{1} | 4 August 2002 | list |
| (393653) 2004 QJ_{5} | 21 August 2004 | list |
| (397245) 2006 QJ | 16 August 2006 | list |
| (399783) 2005 NO_{55} | 9 July 2005 | list |
| (400242) 2007 NZ_{4} | 15 July 2007 | list |
| (400243) 2007 ON_{6} | 21 July 2007 | list |
| (402843) 2007 PX | 4 August 2007 | list |
| (405210) 2003 OY_{10} | 27 July 2003 | list |
| (410620) 2008 PG_{11} | 7 August 2008 | list |

| (416589) 2004 KV | 17 May 2004 | list |
| (416595) 2004 NZ_{8} | 14 July 2004 | list |
| (416606) 2004 QK_{2} | 19 August 2004 | list |
| (417441) 2006 KG_{100} | 24 May 2006 | list |
| (417872) 2007 ND_{1} | 8 July 2007 | list |
| (417876) 2007 PX_{7} | 10 August 2007 | list |
| (423397) 2005 KO_{9} | 28 May 2005 | list |
| (424203) 2007 PA_{25} | 6 August 2007 | list |
| (430752) 2004 PR_{27} | 9 August 2004 | list |
| (430754) 2004 QQ_{13} | 22 August 2004 | list |
| (434205) 2003 QK_{104} | 30 August 2003 | list |
| (438047) 2004 OO_{10} | 21 July 2004 | list |
| (440213) 2004 OD_{6} | 18 July 2004 | list |
| (440214) 2004 OJ_{10} | 21 July 2004 | list |
| (441459) 2008 PF_{11} | 7 August 2008 | list |
| (447026) 2004 OC_{12} | 21 July 2004 | list |
| (456634) 2007 PE_{25} | 10 August 2007 | list |
| (464805) 2004 QS_{13} | 22 August 2004 | list |
| (469511) 2003 OX_{13} | 29 July 2003 | list |
| (474763) 2005 QQ_{75} | 25 August 2005 | list |
| (475423) 2006 KH_{100} | 28 May 2006 | list |
| (480935) 2003 OO_{20} | 31 July 2003 | list |
| (483590) 2004 JE_{5} | 12 May 2004 | list |
| (484085) 2006 QT_{5} | 18 August 2006 | list |
| (497132) 2004 PS_{95} | 13 August 2004 | list |

| (497133) 2004 PV_{97} | 14 August 2004 | list |
| (524992) 2004 QH_{2} | 19 August 2004 | list |
| (526929) 2007 LF_{15} | 12 June 2007 | list |
| (526940) 2007 PR | 5 August 2007 | list |
| (542667) 2013 GC_{85} | 6 July 2005 | list |
| (561205) 2015 RX_{101} | 10 August 2008 | list |
| (566321) 2017 SY_{55} | 27 July 2003 | list |
| (568658) 2004 QE_{2} | 19 August 2004 | list |
| (570362) 2006 OX_{14} | 20 July 2006 | list |
| (576838) 2012 VY_{29} | 2 May 2005 | list |
| (579538) 2014 TL_{43} | 29 July 2006 | list |
| (595579) 2003 OF_{8} | 25 July 2003 | list |
| (608942) 2004 OU_{9} | 19 July 2004 | list |
| (610816) 2006 HG_{51} | 24 April 2006 | list |
| (612782) 2004 NL | 8 July 2004 | list |
| (612792) 2004 PU_{104} | 15 August 2004 | list |
| (613013) 2005 PF_{5} | 7 August 2005 | list |
| (613442) 2006 OY_{14} | 26 July 2006 | list |
| (620787) 2006 QR | 18 August 2006 | list |
| (635007) 2012 UG_{110} | 28 July 2003 | list |
| (635889) 2014 GN_{17} | 19 May 2006 | list |
| (641268) 2003 KT_{18} | 25 May 2003 | list |
| (642181) 2005 LO_{8} | 5 June 2005 | list |
| (642239) 2005 NV_{79} | 9 July 2005 | list |
| (642241) 2005 NA_{83} | 15 July 2005 | list |

| (650307) 2012 ES_{20} | 8 July 2004 | list |
| (650511) 2012 QM_{3} | 27 July 2003 | list |
| (651779) 2013 GE_{18} | 3 May 2006 | list |
| (662378) 2006 AG_{109} | 27 July 2003 | list |
| (663449) 2007 LD_{15} | 8 June 2007 | list |
| (668948) 2012 PC_{28} | 10 July 2005 | list |
| (676699) 2016 NL_{23} | 8 August 2007 | list |
| (722266) 2005 KC | 16 May 2005 | list |
| (723265) 2006 SY_{229} | 28 May 2005 | list |
| (730433) 2012 FZ_{80} | 6 July 2007 | list |
| (741581) 2006 KM_{21} | 19 May 2006 | list |
| (749246) 2014 HM_{46} | 1 May 2006 | list |
| (812248) 2004 MZ_{2} | 20 June 2004 | list |
| (812258) 2004 PT_{104} | 15 August 2004 | list |

== See also ==
- List of minor planet discoverers § J. Broughton
