= Cami (disambiguation) =

A camisole, often shortened to cami, is a woman's undergarment which covers the top part of the body.

Cami or CAMI may also refer to:

== People ==
- Aziz Çami (1893–1943), Albanian army officer and anti-Nazi resistance leader
- Ben Cami (1920–2004), Flemish poet
- Foto Çami (1925–?), Albanian politician
- Nicolas Camí (born 1981), French footballer
- Pedro Martínez Cami (born 1999), Argentine handball player
- Pierre Henri Cami (1884–1958), French humorist
- Qamil Çami (1875–1933), Albanian poet and teacher
- Tefta Cami (born 1940), Albanian politician, former Minister of Culture and former Minister of Education, Sports and Youth
- Thoma Çami (died before 1912), Albanian nationalist and writer
- Camille Ashton (born 1990), American retired soccer player and general manager of San Diego Wave FC
- Cami Baykurt (1877–1949), Turkish military officer and politician, first Turkish Minister of the Interior
- Carmen Cami Bradley (born 1988), American singer-songwriter and keyboardist
- Cami Dalton (fl. 2004–present), American romance novelist
- Camryn Cami Kronish (born 2000), American ice hockey goaltender
- Cambria Cami Privett (born 1993), American soccer player
- Cameron Cami Sawyer, American 21st century mathematician
- Camille Cami Stone (1892–1975), Belgian photographer

== Other uses ==
- Cami Wrather, one of the protagonists of Coop & Cami Ask the World, an American comedy television series
- Cami Lake, on the main island of the Tierra del Fuego archipelago, shared by Argentina and Chile
- Cami River, Quebec, Canada
- 291824 Cami, an asteroid
- Civil Aerospace Medical Institute, part of the United States government
- CAMI Automotive, a Canadian automobile manufacturing company
- Columbia Artists Management, Inc., a talent management agency

== See also ==
- Kami (disambiguation)
- Cammi, a given name
