= Kami (disambiguation) =

Kami are beings venerated in Shinto that are depicted as embodied nature spirits.

Kami may also refer to:

- Kami (official) (Japanese: 守), the highest rank of Kokushi officials
- Origami paper

== People ==
- Kami (caste), a social caste in Nepal
- Kami (given name)
- Kami (surname)
- Kami people, a people in Tanzania
- Kami (musician), a Japanese drummer, a member of Malice Mizer
- Kami (rapper), an American rapper, a member of Leather Corduroys
- Y.Z. Kami, Iranian-American artist

== Places ==
=== Iran ===
- Kami, East Azerbaijan, a village in East Azerbaijan Province
- Kami, South Khorasan, a village in South Khorasan Province
- Kami, Razavi Khorasan, a village in Razavi Khorasan Province

=== Japan ===
- Kami, Hyōgo (Taka), now part of Taka, Hyōgo
- Kami, Hyōgo (Mikata), part of Mikata District, Hyōgo
- Kami, Kōchi
- Kami, Miyagi
- Kami, Nagano

=== Other ===
- Khami, or Kami, an ancient city of Zimbabwe

== Entertainment ==
- Kami (1982 film), a 1982 Malaysian film
- Kami (2008 film), a 2008 Malay film based on the TV series of the same name
- Kami, a character in the manga and anime series of Dragon Ball
- Kami-sama or The Almighty, a character in the manga and anime Oh My Goddess!
- Kami (Sesame Africa), a character on children's television show Takalani Sesame and Sesame Square
- Kami (Magic the Gathering), characters in the Magic: The Gathering block Kamigawa

== Other uses ==
- KAMI (AM), a radio station in Nebraska, United States
- KAMI (Indonesia), Kesatuan Aksi Mahasiswa Indonesia ("Indonesian Students Action Forum"), an Indonesian anti-communist group formed in 1965

== See also ==
- Kami-sama (disambiguation)
