= Kami (given name) =

Kami is a unisex given name that may refer to the following notable people:

- Kami Asgar (born 1965), Iranian-American sound editor and film producer
- Kami Cotler (born 1965), American actress and educator]
- Kami Craig (born 1987), American water polo player
- Kami Garcia (born 1972), American writer
- Kami Hiraiwa (born 1979), Japanese actress
- Kami Imai (born 1980), Japanese manga artist
- Kami Kabange (born 1984), Congolese-born Rwandan basketball player
- Kami Lyle, American singer-songwriter
- Kami Paul, Pakistani musician
- Kami Rita (born 1970), Nepali Sherpa mountaineer
- Kami Sid, Pakistani transgender model
