= Meanings of minor-planet names: 291001–292000 =

As minor planet discoveries are confirmed, they are given a permanent number by the IAU's Minor Planet Center (MPC), and the discoverers can then submit names for them, following the IAU's naming conventions. The list below concerns those minor planets in the specified number-range that have received names, and explains the meanings of those names.

Official naming citations of newly named small Solar System bodies are approved and published in a bulletin by IAU's Working Group for Small Bodies Nomenclature (WGSBN). Before May 2021, citations were published in MPC's Minor Planet Circulars for many decades. Recent citations can also be found on the JPL Small-Body Database (SBDB). Until his death in 2016, German astronomer Lutz D. Schmadel compiled these citations into the Dictionary of Minor Planet Names (DMP) and regularly updated the collection.

Based on Paul Herget's The Names of the Minor Planets, Schmadel also researched the unclear origin of numerous asteroids, most of which had been named prior to World War II. This article incorporates text from this source, which is in the public domain: SBDB New namings may only be added to this list below after official publication as the preannouncement of names is condemned. The WGSBN publishes a comprehensive guideline for the naming rules of non-cometary small Solar System bodies.

== 291001–291100 ==
Named minor planet	Provisional	This minor planet was named for...	Ref · Catalog
There are no named minor planets in this number range

== 291101–291200 ==
back to top

Named minor planet	Provisional	This minor planet was named for...	Ref · Catalog
There are no named minor planets in this number range

== 291201–291300 ==
back to top

Named minor planet	Provisional	This minor planet was named for...	Ref · Catalog
There are no named minor planets in this number range

== 291301–291400 ==
back to top

Named minor planet	Provisional	This minor planet was named for...	Ref · Catalog
291325 de Tyard	2006 BG_{191}	Pontus de Tyard (c. 1521–1605), a French poet and priest, and a member of La Pléiade, a group of seven humanist poets.	JPL · 291325
291387 Katiebouman	2006 CN_{36}	Katie Bouman (born 1989) is an American engineer and computer scientist. Bouman led development of an algorithm that made the first direct image of a black hole possible via the Event Horizon Telescope array.	IAU · 291387

== 291401–291500 ==
back to top

Named minor planet	Provisional	This minor planet was named for...	Ref · Catalog
There are no named minor planets in this number range

== 291501–291600 ==
back to top

Named minor planet	Provisional	This minor planet was named for...	Ref · Catalog
There are no named minor planets in this number range

== 291601–291700 ==
back to top

Named minor planet	Provisional	This minor planet was named for...	Ref · Catalog
291633 Heyun	2006 HY_{20}	He Yun (born 1921), a Chinese radio/TV engineer and the chief designer of the old Shanghai TV Tower. He is also a veteran amateur astronomer, who has been active in the greater Shanghai region for decades.	JPL · 291633

== 291701–291800 ==
back to top

Named minor planet	Provisional	This minor planet was named for...	Ref · Catalog
There are no named minor planets in this number range

== 291801–291900 ==
back to top

Named minor planet	Provisional	This minor planet was named for...	Ref · Catalog
291824 Cami	2006 KH_{133}	Jan Lieven Jo Cami (b. 1972), a Belgian-Canadian astronomer.	IAU · 291824
291847 Ladoix	2006 OP_{1}	Ladoix, a French village situated north of Beaune, in the Burgundy vineyard region	JPL · 291847
291849 Orchestralondon	2006 OL_{2}	Orchestra London Canada, a 1937-founded professional Canadian symphony orchestra in London, Ontario	JPL · 291849
291855 Calabròcorrado	2006 ON_{14}	Corrado Calabrò (born 1935) is an Italian poet who has regenerated contemporary poetry opening it dream-like to science. His poem Roaming tells of a large asteroid that strikes the Moon causing the Earth to wobble.	JPL · 291855

== 291901–292000 ==
back to top

Named minor planet	Provisional	This minor planet was named for...	Ref · Catalog
291921 Rott	2006 QL_{23}	André Rott, French businessman.	IAU · 291921
291923 Kuzmaskryabin	2006 QW_{23}	Andriy Kuzmenko (1968–2015), known as "Kuzma", was a Ukrainian poet, composer, TV-showman and lead singer of the band Skryabin, who died in a car accident	JPL · 291923

back to top

Preceded by 290,001–291,000	Meanings of minor-planet names List of minor planets: 291,001–292,000	Succeeded by 292,001–293,000
