= Kami-sama =

Kami-sama (神様) is the Japanese word for "deity", and may refer to:

- The Almighty (Oh My Goddess!) (神様, Kami-sama), the ruler of Heaven and Earth in Oh My Goddess!
- Kami-sama (Saiyuki), a character who is a servant to Ukoku Sanzo/Dr. Nii Jianyi in the manga Saiyuki
- Kami-sama (神様, Kami-sama), the deity who rules over the galactic system which surrounds Earth in the manga Dr. Slump
- Kami or Kami-sama (神様, Kami-sama), a deity in Dragon Ball who is the God of Earth
- Kamisama (novel), a 1994 novel by Hiromi Kawakami

== See also ==
- Kami (disambiguation)
