= List of minor planets: 291001–292000 =

The following is a partial list of minor planets, running from minor-planet number 291001 through 292000, inclusive. The primary data for this and other partial lists is based on JPL's "Small-Body Orbital Elements" and data available from the Minor Planet Center. Critical list information is also provided by the MPC, unless otherwise specified from Lowell Observatory. A detailed description of the table's columns and additional sources are given on the main page including a complete list of every page in this series, and a statistical break-up on the dynamical classification of minor planets.

Also see the summary list of all named bodies in numerical and alphabetical order, and the corresponding naming citations for the number range of this particular list. New namings may only be added to this list after official publication, as the preannouncement of names is condemned by the Working Group for Small Bodies Nomenclature of the International Astronomical Union.

Near-Earth obj.	MBA (inner)	MBA (outer)	Centaur
Mars-crosser	MBA (middle)	Jupiter trojan	Trans-Neptunian obj.
Unclassified

== 291001–291100 ==
Designation			Discovery			Properties		Ref
Permanent	Provisional	Named after	Date	Site	Discoverer(s)	Category	Diam.	Ref
291001	2005 XO_{85}	—	December 2, 2005	Kitt Peak	Spacewatch	·	2.6 km	MPC · JPL
291002	2005 XG_{88}	—	December 5, 2005	Kitt Peak	Spacewatch	·	2.0 km	MPC · JPL
291003	2005 XU_{90}	—	December 8, 2005	Kitt Peak	Spacewatch	·	3.2 km	MPC · JPL
291004	2005 XG_{91}	—	December 10, 2005	Kitt Peak	Spacewatch	·	750 m	MPC · JPL
291005	2005 XR_{92}	—	December 10, 2005	Catalina	CSS	·	1.5 km	MPC · JPL
291006	2005 XY_{102}	—	December 1, 2005	Kitt Peak	M. W. Buie	·	1.1 km	MPC · JPL
291007	2005 XE_{112}	—	December 2, 2005	Kitt Peak	M. W. Buie	·	1.1 km	MPC · JPL
291008	2005 XK_{112}	—	December 2, 2005	Kitt Peak	M. W. Buie	·	1.5 km	MPC · JPL
291009	2005 XR_{112}	—	December 2, 2005	Kitt Peak	Spacewatch	KOR	1.5 km	MPC · JPL
291010	2005 XN_{115}	—	December 7, 2005	Kitt Peak	Spacewatch	(5)	1.3 km	MPC · JPL
291011	2005 YM_{1}	—	December 21, 2005	Catalina	CSS	·	1.9 km	MPC · JPL
291012	2005 YA_{4}	—	December 22, 2005	Pla D'Arguines	R. Ferrando	·	1.9 km	MPC · JPL
291013	2005 YY_{6}	—	December 21, 2005	Junk Bond	D. Healy	THM	2.7 km	MPC · JPL
291014	2005 YJ_{8}	—	December 22, 2005	Kitt Peak	Spacewatch	EUN	2.0 km	MPC · JPL
291015	2005 YH_{9}	—	December 21, 2005	Kitt Peak	Spacewatch	·	2.0 km	MPC · JPL
291016	2005 YD_{11}	—	December 21, 2005	Kitt Peak	Spacewatch	·	1.8 km	MPC · JPL
291017	2005 YQ_{11}	—	December 21, 2005	Kitt Peak	Spacewatch	·	810 m	MPC · JPL
291018	2005 YL_{14}	—	December 22, 2005	Kitt Peak	Spacewatch	·	960 m	MPC · JPL
291019	2005 YD_{15}	—	December 22, 2005	Kitt Peak	Spacewatch	·	2.4 km	MPC · JPL
291020	2005 YY_{18}	—	December 23, 2005	Kitt Peak	Spacewatch	·	2.4 km	MPC · JPL
291021	2005 YH_{23}	—	December 24, 2005	Kitt Peak	Spacewatch	V	970 m	MPC · JPL
291022	2005 YR_{24}	—	December 24, 2005	Kitt Peak	Spacewatch	·	1.7 km	MPC · JPL
291023	2005 YT_{25}	—	December 24, 2005	Kitt Peak	Spacewatch	·	3.4 km	MPC · JPL
291024	2005 YG_{27}	—	December 22, 2005	Kitt Peak	Spacewatch	THM	2.4 km	MPC · JPL
291025	2005 YP_{27}	—	December 22, 2005	Kitt Peak	Spacewatch	·	2.9 km	MPC · JPL
291026	2005 YQ_{28}	—	December 22, 2005	Kitt Peak	Spacewatch	THM	2.3 km	MPC · JPL
291027	2005 YM_{29}	—	December 24, 2005	Kitt Peak	Spacewatch	NYS	770 m	MPC · JPL
291028	2005 YM_{30}	—	December 21, 2005	Kitt Peak	Spacewatch	·	2.9 km	MPC · JPL
291029	2005 YX_{30}	—	December 22, 2005	Kitt Peak	Spacewatch	·	830 m	MPC · JPL
291030	2005 YR_{32}	—	December 22, 2005	Kitt Peak	Spacewatch	·	900 m	MPC · JPL
291031	2005 YN_{33}	—	December 24, 2005	Kitt Peak	Spacewatch	·	1.2 km	MPC · JPL
291032	2005 YP_{34}	—	December 24, 2005	Kitt Peak	Spacewatch	·	1.8 km	MPC · JPL
291033	2005 YG_{35}	—	December 25, 2005	Kitt Peak	Spacewatch	·	740 m	MPC · JPL
291034	2005 YR_{36}	—	December 25, 2005	Kitt Peak	Spacewatch	·	2.2 km	MPC · JPL
291035	2005 YE_{37}	—	December 24, 2005	Socorro	LINEAR	H	670 m	MPC · JPL
291036	2005 YK_{39}	—	December 26, 2005	Catalina	CSS	·	3.3 km	MPC · JPL
291037	2005 YA_{40}	—	December 22, 2005	Kitt Peak	Spacewatch	·	1.1 km	MPC · JPL
291038	2005 YO_{40}	—	December 24, 2005	Kitt Peak	Spacewatch	·	790 m	MPC · JPL
291039	2005 YU_{40}	—	December 25, 2005	Mount Lemmon	Mount Lemmon Survey	·	3.4 km	MPC · JPL
291040	2005 YF_{42}	—	December 22, 2005	Kitt Peak	Spacewatch	·	740 m	MPC · JPL
291041	2005 YJ_{45}	—	December 25, 2005	Kitt Peak	Spacewatch	·	780 m	MPC · JPL
291042	2005 YH_{46}	—	December 25, 2005	Kitt Peak	Spacewatch	EOS	2.3 km	MPC · JPL
291043	2005 YB_{48}	—	December 21, 2005	Kitt Peak	Spacewatch	·	1.2 km	MPC · JPL
291044	2005 YH_{49}	—	December 22, 2005	Kitt Peak	Spacewatch	MAS	820 m	MPC · JPL
291045	2005 YU_{49}	—	December 24, 2005	Kitt Peak	Spacewatch	HYG	3.4 km	MPC · JPL
291046	2005 YX_{50}	—	December 25, 2005	Kitt Peak	Spacewatch	·	1.8 km	MPC · JPL
291047	2005 YK_{51}	—	December 25, 2005	Mount Lemmon	Mount Lemmon Survey	·	1.8 km	MPC · JPL
291048	2005 YY_{52}	—	December 22, 2005	Kitt Peak	Spacewatch	NYS	970 m	MPC · JPL
291049	2005 YC_{54}	—	December 24, 2005	Kitt Peak	Spacewatch	·	2.1 km	MPC · JPL
291050	2005 YK_{54}	—	December 25, 2005	Kitt Peak	Spacewatch	·	1.4 km	MPC · JPL
291051	2005 YD_{55}	—	December 25, 2005	Kitt Peak	Spacewatch	·	2.2 km	MPC · JPL
291052	2005 YW_{57}	—	December 24, 2005	Kitt Peak	Spacewatch	·	2.8 km	MPC · JPL
291053	2005 YC_{58}	—	December 24, 2005	Kitt Peak	Spacewatch	·	3.1 km	MPC · JPL
291054	2005 YZ_{62}	—	December 24, 2005	Kitt Peak	Spacewatch	·	4.4 km	MPC · JPL
291055	2005 YQ_{63}	—	December 24, 2005	Kitt Peak	Spacewatch	MAS	730 m	MPC · JPL
291056	2005 YW_{64}	—	December 25, 2005	Kitt Peak	Spacewatch	·	2.1 km	MPC · JPL
291057	2005 YO_{65}	—	December 25, 2005	Kitt Peak	Spacewatch	MAS	950 m	MPC · JPL
291058	2005 YJ_{70}	—	December 26, 2005	Kitt Peak	Spacewatch	NYS	1.1 km	MPC · JPL
291059	2005 YQ_{70}	—	December 27, 2005	Mount Lemmon	Mount Lemmon Survey	KOR	1.8 km	MPC · JPL
291060	2005 YH_{77}	—	December 24, 2005	Kitt Peak	Spacewatch	·	1.4 km	MPC · JPL
291061	2005 YZ_{79}	—	December 24, 2005	Kitt Peak	Spacewatch	THM	2.7 km	MPC · JPL
291062	2005 YK_{80}	—	December 24, 2005	Kitt Peak	Spacewatch	·	3.0 km	MPC · JPL
291063	2005 YV_{86}	—	December 25, 2005	Mount Lemmon	Mount Lemmon Survey	·	2.9 km	MPC · JPL
291064	2005 YW_{88}	—	December 25, 2005	Mount Lemmon	Mount Lemmon Survey	CYB	3.3 km	MPC · JPL
291065	2005 YV_{89}	—	December 26, 2005	Mount Lemmon	Mount Lemmon Survey	T_{j} (2.99)	5.4 km	MPC · JPL
291066	2005 YY_{90}	—	December 26, 2005	Mount Lemmon	Mount Lemmon Survey	·	2.8 km	MPC · JPL
291067	2005 YN_{92}	—	December 27, 2005	Mount Lemmon	Mount Lemmon Survey	·	2.2 km	MPC · JPL
291068	2005 YS_{98}	—	December 26, 2005	Kitt Peak	Spacewatch	·	900 m	MPC · JPL
291069	2005 YV_{103}	—	December 25, 2005	Kitt Peak	Spacewatch	MAS	930 m	MPC · JPL
291070	2005 YV_{104}	—	December 25, 2005	Kitt Peak	Spacewatch	·	1.5 km	MPC · JPL
291071	2005 YX_{104}	—	December 25, 2005	Kitt Peak	Spacewatch	·	3.1 km	MPC · JPL
291072	2005 YD_{108}	—	December 25, 2005	Kitt Peak	Spacewatch	·	2.5 km	MPC · JPL
291073	2005 YK_{113}	—	December 25, 2005	Kitt Peak	Spacewatch	·	4.0 km	MPC · JPL
291074	2005 YD_{116}	—	December 25, 2005	Kitt Peak	Spacewatch	·	940 m	MPC · JPL
291075	2005 YY_{116}	—	December 25, 2005	Kitt Peak	Spacewatch	·	940 m	MPC · JPL
291076	2005 YF_{117}	—	December 25, 2005	Kitt Peak	Spacewatch	·	1.6 km	MPC · JPL
291077	2005 YG_{120}	—	December 27, 2005	Mount Lemmon	Mount Lemmon Survey	·	2.3 km	MPC · JPL
291078	2005 YM_{120}	—	December 27, 2005	Mount Lemmon	Mount Lemmon Survey	EOS	2.7 km	MPC · JPL
291079	2005 YR_{120}	—	December 27, 2005	Mount Lemmon	Mount Lemmon Survey	NYS	1.1 km	MPC · JPL
291080	2005 YV_{120}	—	December 27, 2005	Kitt Peak	Spacewatch	·	2.6 km	MPC · JPL
291081	2005 YY_{120}	—	December 27, 2005	Mount Lemmon	Mount Lemmon Survey	·	4.7 km	MPC · JPL
291082	2005 YB_{121}	—	December 28, 2005	Kitt Peak	Spacewatch	·	2.0 km	MPC · JPL
291083	2005 YZ_{122}	—	December 24, 2005	Socorro	LINEAR	·	1.2 km	MPC · JPL
291084	2005 YK_{123}	—	December 24, 2005	Kitt Peak	Spacewatch	·	2.7 km	MPC · JPL
291085	2005 YP_{123}	—	December 24, 2005	Kitt Peak	Spacewatch	·	3.4 km	MPC · JPL
291086	2005 YU_{127}	—	January 26, 2001	Kitt Peak	Spacewatch	·	2.6 km	MPC · JPL
291087	2005 YT_{131}	—	December 25, 2005	Mount Lemmon	Mount Lemmon Survey	·	2.5 km	MPC · JPL
291088	2005 YZ_{131}	—	December 25, 2005	Mount Lemmon	Mount Lemmon Survey	·	2.0 km	MPC · JPL
291089	2005 YA_{133}	—	December 26, 2005	Kitt Peak	Spacewatch	·	1.3 km	MPC · JPL
291090	2005 YL_{133}	—	December 26, 2005	Kitt Peak	Spacewatch	·	1.1 km	MPC · JPL
291091	2005 YN_{133}	—	December 26, 2005	Kitt Peak	Spacewatch	·	3.5 km	MPC · JPL
291092	2005 YS_{133}	—	December 26, 2005	Kitt Peak	Spacewatch	·	1.8 km	MPC · JPL
291093	2005 YF_{134}	—	December 26, 2005	Kitt Peak	Spacewatch	·	1.9 km	MPC · JPL
291094	2005 YW_{134}	—	December 26, 2005	Kitt Peak	Spacewatch	·	1.3 km	MPC · JPL
291095	2005 YZ_{134}	—	December 26, 2005	Kitt Peak	Spacewatch	V	840 m	MPC · JPL
291096	2005 YG_{135}	—	December 26, 2005	Kitt Peak	Spacewatch	·	3.0 km	MPC · JPL
291097	2005 YW_{136}	—	December 26, 2005	Kitt Peak	Spacewatch	·	890 m	MPC · JPL
291098	2005 YZ_{143}	—	December 28, 2005	Mount Lemmon	Mount Lemmon Survey	·	1.4 km	MPC · JPL
291099	2005 YL_{148}	—	December 25, 2005	Kitt Peak	Spacewatch	·	1.5 km	MPC · JPL
291100	2005 YX_{148}	—	December 25, 2005	Kitt Peak	Spacewatch	AGN	1.6 km	MPC · JPL

== 291101–291200 ==
back to top

Designation			Discovery			Properties		Ref
Permanent	Provisional	Named after	Date	Site	Discoverer(s)	Category	Diam.	Ref
291101	2005 YP_{153}	—	December 29, 2005	Catalina	CSS	·	970 m	MPC · JPL
291102	2005 YK_{154}	—	December 29, 2005	Kitt Peak	Spacewatch	·	4.1 km	MPC · JPL
291103	2005 YU_{160}	—	December 27, 2005	Kitt Peak	Spacewatch	·	4.4 km	MPC · JPL
291104	2005 YO_{161}	—	December 27, 2005	Socorro	LINEAR	·	4.6 km	MPC · JPL
291105	2005 YB_{165}	—	December 29, 2005	Socorro	LINEAR	·	3.0 km	MPC · JPL
291106	2005 YL_{165}	—	December 30, 2005	Mount Lemmon	Mount Lemmon Survey	·	1.8 km	MPC · JPL
291107	2005 YR_{166}	—	December 27, 2005	Kitt Peak	Spacewatch	·	1.8 km	MPC · JPL
291108	2005 YT_{167}	—	December 27, 2005	Kitt Peak	Spacewatch	LIX	4.2 km	MPC · JPL
291109	2005 YX_{172}	—	December 24, 2005	Socorro	LINEAR	TIR	4.5 km	MPC · JPL
291110	2005 YW_{173}	—	December 25, 2005	Catalina	CSS	·	2.1 km	MPC · JPL
291111	2005 YV_{174}	—	December 29, 2005	Palomar	NEAT	·	4.1 km	MPC · JPL
291112	2005 YB_{177}	—	December 22, 2005	Kitt Peak	Spacewatch	·	910 m	MPC · JPL
291113	2005 YQ_{178}	—	December 25, 2005	Kitt Peak	Spacewatch	·	790 m	MPC · JPL
291114	2005 YS_{179}	—	December 27, 2005	Kitt Peak	Spacewatch	·	780 m	MPC · JPL
291115	2005 YU_{179}	—	December 27, 2005	Mount Lemmon	Mount Lemmon Survey	·	1.1 km	MPC · JPL
291116	2005 YB_{182}	—	December 27, 2005	Catalina	CSS	·	2.5 km	MPC · JPL
291117	2005 YJ_{186}	—	December 29, 2005	Catalina	CSS	H	550 m	MPC · JPL
291118	2005 YS_{188}	—	December 28, 2005	Mount Lemmon	Mount Lemmon Survey	AGN	1.5 km	MPC · JPL
291119	2005 YD_{194}	—	December 31, 2005	Kitt Peak	Spacewatch	NYS	1.1 km	MPC · JPL
291120	2005 YP_{199}	—	December 25, 2005	Mount Lemmon	Mount Lemmon Survey	·	1.2 km	MPC · JPL
291121	2005 YB_{200}	—	December 26, 2005	Mount Lemmon	Mount Lemmon Survey	THM	2.6 km	MPC · JPL
291122	2005 YJ_{200}	—	December 26, 2005	Kitt Peak	Spacewatch	·	3.1 km	MPC · JPL
291123	2005 YP_{200}	—	December 22, 2005	Kitt Peak	Spacewatch	KOR	1.6 km	MPC · JPL
291124	2005 YW_{200}	—	December 22, 2005	Kitt Peak	Spacewatch	·	1.4 km	MPC · JPL
291125	2005 YB_{201}	—	December 22, 2005	Kitt Peak	Spacewatch	·	1.6 km	MPC · JPL
291126	2005 YF_{201}	—	December 22, 2005	Kitt Peak	Spacewatch	THM	3.0 km	MPC · JPL
291127	2005 YJ_{201}	—	December 22, 2005	Kitt Peak	Spacewatch	·	2.3 km	MPC · JPL
291128	2005 YP_{201}	—	December 24, 2005	Kitt Peak	Spacewatch	KOR	2.0 km	MPC · JPL
291129	2005 YY_{204}	—	December 26, 2005	Mount Lemmon	Mount Lemmon Survey	·	2.4 km	MPC · JPL
291130	2005 YO_{207}	—	December 28, 2005	Mount Lemmon	Mount Lemmon Survey	·	3.2 km	MPC · JPL
291131	2005 YR_{207}	—	December 29, 2005	Mount Lemmon	Mount Lemmon Survey	MAS	830 m	MPC · JPL
291132	2005 YL_{208}	—	December 21, 2005	Catalina	CSS	·	5.1 km	MPC · JPL
291133	2005 YD_{212}	—	December 28, 2005	Palomar	NEAT	·	4.8 km	MPC · JPL
291134	2005 YN_{214}	—	December 30, 2005	Catalina	CSS	·	3.3 km	MPC · JPL
291135	2005 YS_{215}	—	December 29, 2005	Kitt Peak	Spacewatch	·	3.1 km	MPC · JPL
291136	2005 YO_{218}	—	December 30, 2005	Mount Lemmon	Mount Lemmon Survey	·	1.5 km	MPC · JPL
291137	2005 YC_{219}	—	December 31, 2005	Kitt Peak	Spacewatch	NYS	1.6 km	MPC · JPL
291138	2005 YH_{223}	—	December 24, 2005	Kitt Peak	Spacewatch	MAS	680 m	MPC · JPL
291139	2005 YF_{225}	—	December 25, 2005	Mount Lemmon	Mount Lemmon Survey	KOR	1.5 km	MPC · JPL
291140	2005 YK_{229}	—	December 25, 2005	Mount Lemmon	Mount Lemmon Survey	·	1.2 km	MPC · JPL
291141	2005 YH_{230}	—	December 26, 2005	Kitt Peak	Spacewatch	NYS	1.0 km	MPC · JPL
291142	2005 YS_{231}	—	December 27, 2005	Kitt Peak	Spacewatch	·	2.7 km	MPC · JPL
291143	2005 YR_{236}	—	December 28, 2005	Kitt Peak	Spacewatch	KOR	1.4 km	MPC · JPL
291144	2005 YK_{237}	—	December 28, 2005	Mount Lemmon	Mount Lemmon Survey	·	570 m	MPC · JPL
291145	2005 YW_{237}	—	December 28, 2005	Kitt Peak	Spacewatch	·	2.9 km	MPC · JPL
291146	2005 YB_{246}	—	December 30, 2005	Kitt Peak	Spacewatch	·	4.3 km	MPC · JPL
291147	2005 YY_{250}	—	December 28, 2005	Kitt Peak	Spacewatch	KOR	1.3 km	MPC · JPL
291148	2005 YN_{256}	—	December 30, 2005	Kitt Peak	Spacewatch	·	810 m	MPC · JPL
291149	2005 YZ_{256}	—	December 30, 2005	Kitt Peak	Spacewatch	EOS	2.5 km	MPC · JPL
291150	2005 YE_{262}	—	December 25, 2005	Kitt Peak	Spacewatch	THM	2.4 km	MPC · JPL
291151	2005 YS_{265}	—	December 26, 2005	Kitt Peak	Spacewatch	(7744)	1.3 km	MPC · JPL
291152	2005 YX_{273}	—	December 30, 2005	Mount Lemmon	Mount Lemmon Survey	·	5.3 km	MPC · JPL
291153	2005 YM_{284}	—	December 28, 2005	Mount Lemmon	Mount Lemmon Survey	·	1.9 km	MPC · JPL
291154	2005 YU_{285}	—	December 30, 2005	Kitt Peak	Spacewatch	NYS	1.7 km	MPC · JPL
291155	2005 YD_{286}	—	December 30, 2005	Kitt Peak	Spacewatch	·	2.7 km	MPC · JPL
291156	2005 YS_{286}	—	December 30, 2005	Kitt Peak	Spacewatch	(1298)	3.1 km	MPC · JPL
291157	2005 YW_{290}	—	December 25, 2005	Kitt Peak	Spacewatch	·	750 m	MPC · JPL
291158	2005 YM_{291}	—	December 26, 2005	Mount Lemmon	Mount Lemmon Survey	KOR	1.4 km	MPC · JPL
291159	2005 YT_{291}	—	December 26, 2005	Mount Lemmon	Mount Lemmon Survey	HOF	2.8 km	MPC · JPL
291160	2006 AE	—	January 2, 2006	7300	W. K. Y. Yeung	·	1.7 km	MPC · JPL
291161	2006 AV	—	January 4, 2006	Kitt Peak	Spacewatch	·	2.9 km	MPC · JPL
291162	2006 AY_{6}	—	January 5, 2006	Catalina	CSS	·	4.6 km	MPC · JPL
291163	2006 AS_{11}	—	January 2, 2006	Mount Lemmon	Mount Lemmon Survey	EOS	3.0 km	MPC · JPL
291164	2006 AE_{14}	—	January 5, 2006	Mount Lemmon	Mount Lemmon Survey	·	1.8 km	MPC · JPL
291165	2006 AC_{15}	—	January 5, 2006	Mount Lemmon	Mount Lemmon Survey	H	640 m	MPC · JPL
291166	2006 AA_{23}	—	January 4, 2006	Kitt Peak	Spacewatch	NAE	3.1 km	MPC · JPL
291167	2006 AJ_{24}	—	January 5, 2006	Kitt Peak	Spacewatch	·	1.1 km	MPC · JPL
291168	2006 AM_{24}	—	January 5, 2006	Kitt Peak	Spacewatch	·	710 m	MPC · JPL
291169	2006 AP_{25}	—	January 5, 2006	Kitt Peak	Spacewatch	KOR	1.7 km	MPC · JPL
291170	2006 AU_{25}	—	January 5, 2006	Kitt Peak	Spacewatch	·	720 m	MPC · JPL
291171	2006 AS_{28}	—	January 6, 2006	Kitt Peak	Spacewatch	·	2.8 km	MPC · JPL
291172	2006 AK_{33}	—	January 6, 2006	Socorro	LINEAR	·	3.0 km	MPC · JPL
291173	2006 AM_{33}	—	January 6, 2006	Catalina	CSS	·	3.8 km	MPC · JPL
291174	2006 AV_{33}	—	January 6, 2006	Kitt Peak	Spacewatch	·	3.1 km	MPC · JPL
291175	2006 AA_{37}	—	January 4, 2006	Kitt Peak	Spacewatch	MAS	890 m	MPC · JPL
291176	2006 AY_{39}	—	January 7, 2006	Mount Lemmon	Mount Lemmon Survey	THM	2.3 km	MPC · JPL
291177	2006 AB_{40}	—	January 7, 2006	Mount Lemmon	Mount Lemmon Survey	·	1.1 km	MPC · JPL
291178	2006 AD_{43}	—	January 6, 2006	Kitt Peak	Spacewatch	·	3.6 km	MPC · JPL
291179	2006 AJ_{44}	—	January 7, 2006	Kitt Peak	Spacewatch	·	2.5 km	MPC · JPL
291180	2006 AS_{44}	—	January 7, 2006	Mount Lemmon	Mount Lemmon Survey	MAS	790 m	MPC · JPL
291181	2006 AL_{45}	—	January 2, 2006	Mount Lemmon	Mount Lemmon Survey	·	850 m	MPC · JPL
291182	2006 AW_{45}	—	January 5, 2006	Kitt Peak	Spacewatch	·	2.8 km	MPC · JPL
291183	2006 AP_{49}	—	January 5, 2006	Kitt Peak	Spacewatch	·	3.1 km	MPC · JPL
291184	2006 AB_{50}	—	January 5, 2006	Kitt Peak	Spacewatch	MAS	800 m	MPC · JPL
291185	2006 AC_{53}	—	January 5, 2006	Kitt Peak	Spacewatch	KOR	1.4 km	MPC · JPL
291186	2006 AH_{53}	—	January 5, 2006	Kitt Peak	Spacewatch	·	2.4 km	MPC · JPL
291187	2006 AG_{54}	—	January 5, 2006	Kitt Peak	Spacewatch	V	680 m	MPC · JPL
291188	2006 AL_{54}	—	January 5, 2006	Kitt Peak	Spacewatch	·	1.2 km	MPC · JPL
291189	2006 AR_{54}	—	January 5, 2006	Kitt Peak	Spacewatch	EOS	3.1 km	MPC · JPL
291190	2006 AW_{57}	—	January 8, 2006	Mount Lemmon	Mount Lemmon Survey	·	690 m	MPC · JPL
291191	2006 AF_{58}	—	January 8, 2006	Mount Lemmon	Mount Lemmon Survey	(5)	1.0 km	MPC · JPL
291192	2006 AH_{62}	—	January 5, 2006	Kitt Peak	Spacewatch	·	2.5 km	MPC · JPL
291193	2006 AP_{62}	—	January 6, 2006	Kitt Peak	Spacewatch	·	3.3 km	MPC · JPL
291194	2006 AQ_{62}	—	January 6, 2006	Kitt Peak	Spacewatch	NYS	1.1 km	MPC · JPL
291195	2006 AR_{63}	—	January 6, 2006	Mount Lemmon	Mount Lemmon Survey	T_{j} (2.98) · HIL · 3:2	7.1 km	MPC · JPL
291196	2006 AQ_{64}	—	January 8, 2006	Kitt Peak	Spacewatch	KOR	1.4 km	MPC · JPL
291197	2006 AU_{64}	—	January 8, 2006	Kitt Peak	Spacewatch	THM	2.4 km	MPC · JPL
291198	2006 AK_{69}	—	January 6, 2006	Mount Lemmon	Mount Lemmon Survey	·	1.2 km	MPC · JPL
291199	2006 AF_{71}	—	January 6, 2006	Kitt Peak	Spacewatch	·	1.7 km	MPC · JPL
291200	2006 AO_{73}	—	January 8, 2006	Mount Lemmon	Mount Lemmon Survey	·	880 m	MPC · JPL

== 291201–291300 ==
back to top

Designation			Discovery			Properties		Ref
Permanent	Provisional	Named after	Date	Site	Discoverer(s)	Category	Diam.	Ref
291201	2006 AN_{74}	—	January 6, 2006	Socorro	LINEAR	·	5.8 km	MPC · JPL
291202	2006 AD_{79}	—	January 6, 2006	Kitt Peak	Spacewatch	EOS	2.3 km	MPC · JPL
291203	2006 AC_{80}	—	January 4, 2006	Kitt Peak	Spacewatch	HYG	3.0 km	MPC · JPL
291204	2006 AE_{80}	—	January 5, 2006	Mount Lemmon	Mount Lemmon Survey	·	910 m	MPC · JPL
291205	2006 AO_{80}	—	January 6, 2006	Mount Lemmon	Mount Lemmon Survey	NYS	1 km	MPC · JPL
291206	2006 AQ_{80}	—	January 6, 2006	Mount Lemmon	Mount Lemmon Survey	·	860 m	MPC · JPL
291207	2006 AB_{82}	—	January 2, 2006	Mount Lemmon	Mount Lemmon Survey	·	2.0 km	MPC · JPL
291208	2006 AW_{82}	—	January 8, 2006	Catalina	CSS	·	2.3 km	MPC · JPL
291209	2006 AG_{84}	—	January 6, 2006	Catalina	CSS	·	4.7 km	MPC · JPL
291210	2006 AB_{85}	—	January 6, 2006	Catalina	CSS	·	6.4 km	MPC · JPL
291211	2006 AZ_{89}	—	January 5, 2006	Mount Lemmon	Mount Lemmon Survey	·	960 m	MPC · JPL
291212	2006 AB_{93}	—	January 7, 2006	Kitt Peak	Spacewatch	·	4.2 km	MPC · JPL
291213	2006 AR_{100}	—	January 5, 2006	Mount Lemmon	Mount Lemmon Survey	MAS	790 m	MPC · JPL
291214	2006 AS_{100}	—	January 5, 2006	Mount Lemmon	Mount Lemmon Survey	·	990 m	MPC · JPL
291215	2006 AY_{101}	—	January 5, 2006	Mount Lemmon	Mount Lemmon Survey	(5)	1.2 km	MPC · JPL
291216	2006 AA_{102}	—	January 5, 2006	Mount Lemmon	Mount Lemmon Survey	·	3.4 km	MPC · JPL
291217	2006 AD_{102}	—	January 7, 2006	Mount Lemmon	Mount Lemmon Survey	·	2.3 km	MPC · JPL
291218	2006 AM_{102}	—	January 7, 2006	Mount Lemmon	Mount Lemmon Survey	MAS	850 m	MPC · JPL
291219	2006 AR_{104}	—	January 7, 2006	Mount Lemmon	Mount Lemmon Survey	·	950 m	MPC · JPL
291220	2006 BD	—	January 18, 2006	Catalina	CSS	·	2.2 km	MPC · JPL
291221	2006 BK_{1}	—	January 20, 2006	Kitt Peak	Spacewatch	·	960 m	MPC · JPL
291222	2006 BL_{5}	—	January 21, 2006	Mount Lemmon	Mount Lemmon Survey	HYG	3.5 km	MPC · JPL
291223	2006 BM_{5}	—	January 21, 2006	Anderson Mesa	LONEOS	·	1.7 km	MPC · JPL
291224	2006 BX_{6}	—	January 20, 2006	Kitt Peak	Spacewatch	·	1.3 km	MPC · JPL
291225	2006 BJ_{8}	—	January 22, 2006	Junk Bond	D. Healy	·	3.6 km	MPC · JPL
291226	2006 BZ_{10}	—	January 20, 2006	Kitt Peak	Spacewatch	·	1.6 km	MPC · JPL
291227	2006 BW_{16}	—	January 22, 2006	Mount Lemmon	Mount Lemmon Survey	·	2.6 km	MPC · JPL
291228	2006 BU_{19}	—	January 22, 2006	Anderson Mesa	LONEOS	·	1.6 km	MPC · JPL
291229	2006 BH_{20}	—	January 22, 2006	Mount Lemmon	Mount Lemmon Survey	·	860 m	MPC · JPL
291230	2006 BR_{22}	—	January 22, 2006	Mount Lemmon	Mount Lemmon Survey	·	1.5 km	MPC · JPL
291231	2006 BW_{23}	—	January 23, 2006	Mount Lemmon	Mount Lemmon Survey	·	3.0 km	MPC · JPL
291232	2006 BA_{25}	—	January 23, 2006	Mount Lemmon	Mount Lemmon Survey	·	1.9 km	MPC · JPL
291233	2006 BO_{29}	—	January 23, 2006	Mount Nyukasa	Japan Aerospace Exploration Agency	·	1.5 km	MPC · JPL
291234	2006 BK_{30}	—	January 20, 2006	Kitt Peak	Spacewatch	·	3.2 km	MPC · JPL
291235	2006 BP_{30}	—	January 20, 2006	Kitt Peak	Spacewatch	·	790 m	MPC · JPL
291236	2006 BG_{31}	—	January 20, 2006	Kitt Peak	Spacewatch	EOS	2.7 km	MPC · JPL
291237	2006 BG_{33}	—	January 21, 2006	Kitt Peak	Spacewatch	·	1.6 km	MPC · JPL
291238	2006 BU_{34}	—	January 22, 2006	Mount Lemmon	Mount Lemmon Survey	·	2.6 km	MPC · JPL
291239	2006 BY_{36}	—	January 23, 2006	Kitt Peak	Spacewatch	·	4.5 km	MPC · JPL
291240	2006 BE_{39}	—	January 24, 2006	Socorro	LINEAR	HYG	3.9 km	MPC · JPL
291241	2006 BQ_{41}	—	January 22, 2006	Mount Lemmon	Mount Lemmon Survey	·	950 m	MPC · JPL
291242	2006 BW_{42}	—	January 23, 2006	Kitt Peak	Spacewatch	·	4.1 km	MPC · JPL
291243	2006 BV_{43}	—	January 23, 2006	Kitt Peak	Spacewatch	NYS	1.3 km	MPC · JPL
291244	2006 BZ_{44}	—	January 23, 2006	Mount Lemmon	Mount Lemmon Survey	·	3.5 km	MPC · JPL
291245	2006 BG_{45}	—	January 23, 2006	Mount Lemmon	Mount Lemmon Survey	MAS	760 m	MPC · JPL
291246	2006 BM_{51}	—	January 25, 2006	Kitt Peak	Spacewatch	·	2.2 km	MPC · JPL
291247	2006 BE_{52}	—	January 25, 2006	Kitt Peak	Spacewatch	THM	2.6 km	MPC · JPL
291248	2006 BT_{52}	—	January 25, 2006	Kitt Peak	Spacewatch	·	2.7 km	MPC · JPL
291249	2006 BJ_{53}	—	January 25, 2006	Kitt Peak	Spacewatch	·	1.7 km	MPC · JPL
291250	2006 BB_{54}	—	January 25, 2006	Kitt Peak	Spacewatch	·	2.8 km	MPC · JPL
291251	2006 BM_{54}	—	January 25, 2006	Kitt Peak	Spacewatch	L5	10 km	MPC · JPL
291252	2006 BP_{54}	—	January 25, 2006	Kitt Peak	Spacewatch	·	1.7 km	MPC · JPL
291253	2006 BT_{54}	—	January 25, 2006	Kitt Peak	Spacewatch	·	3.2 km	MPC · JPL
291254	2006 BU_{54}	—	January 25, 2006	Kitt Peak	Spacewatch	·	1.3 km	MPC · JPL
291255	2006 BZ_{55}	—	January 26, 2006	Mount Lemmon	Mount Lemmon Survey	L5	14 km	MPC · JPL
291256	2006 BR_{56}	—	January 22, 2006	Mount Lemmon	Mount Lemmon Survey	·	750 m	MPC · JPL
291257	2006 BK_{57}	—	January 23, 2006	Kitt Peak	Spacewatch	NYS	1.2 km	MPC · JPL
291258	2006 BM_{60}	—	January 26, 2006	Kitt Peak	Spacewatch	·	4.4 km	MPC · JPL
291259	2006 BV_{69}	—	January 23, 2006	Kitt Peak	Spacewatch	·	1.4 km	MPC · JPL
291260	2006 BE_{73}	—	January 23, 2006	Kitt Peak	Spacewatch	L5	9.2 km	MPC · JPL
291261	2006 BW_{73}	—	January 23, 2006	Kitt Peak	Spacewatch	·	2.6 km	MPC · JPL
291262	2006 BS_{75}	—	January 23, 2006	Kitt Peak	Spacewatch	·	1.7 km	MPC · JPL
291263	2006 BC_{76}	—	January 23, 2006	Kitt Peak	Spacewatch	·	2.2 km	MPC · JPL
291264	2006 BB_{81}	—	January 23, 2006	Kitt Peak	Spacewatch	KOR	1.8 km	MPC · JPL
291265	2006 BB_{82}	—	January 23, 2006	Kitt Peak	Spacewatch	·	790 m	MPC · JPL
291266	2006 BT_{82}	—	January 24, 2006	Kitt Peak	Spacewatch	EUP	6.9 km	MPC · JPL
291267	2006 BA_{85}	—	January 25, 2006	Kitt Peak	Spacewatch	·	2.0 km	MPC · JPL
291268	2006 BJ_{87}	—	January 25, 2006	Kitt Peak	Spacewatch	·	5.1 km	MPC · JPL
291269	2006 BB_{88}	—	January 25, 2006	Kitt Peak	Spacewatch	·	1.4 km	MPC · JPL
291270	2006 BQ_{89}	—	January 25, 2006	Kitt Peak	Spacewatch	·	2.5 km	MPC · JPL
291271	2006 BR_{90}	—	January 25, 2006	Kitt Peak	Spacewatch	·	1.2 km	MPC · JPL
291272	2006 BM_{91}	—	January 26, 2006	Kitt Peak	Spacewatch	·	750 m	MPC · JPL
291273	2006 BE_{92}	—	January 26, 2006	Mount Lemmon	Mount Lemmon Survey	·	1.8 km	MPC · JPL
291274	2006 BA_{97}	—	January 26, 2006	Mount Lemmon	Mount Lemmon Survey	·	1.1 km	MPC · JPL
291275	2006 BF_{97}	—	January 26, 2006	Kitt Peak	Spacewatch	·	1.2 km	MPC · JPL
291276	2006 BE_{98}	—	January 27, 2006	Mount Lemmon	Mount Lemmon Survey	L5	13 km	MPC · JPL
291277	2006 BJ_{100}	—	January 22, 2006	Catalina	CSS	H	710 m	MPC · JPL
291278	2006 BL_{102}	—	January 23, 2006	Mount Lemmon	Mount Lemmon Survey	NYS	1.1 km	MPC · JPL
291279	2006 BQ_{113}	—	January 25, 2006	Kitt Peak	Spacewatch	·	850 m	MPC · JPL
291280	2006 BG_{115}	—	January 26, 2006	Kitt Peak	Spacewatch	NYS	1.1 km	MPC · JPL
291281	2006 BQ_{117}	—	January 26, 2006	Mount Lemmon	Mount Lemmon Survey	·	710 m	MPC · JPL
291282	2006 BU_{118}	—	January 26, 2006	Kitt Peak	Spacewatch	·	1.0 km	MPC · JPL
291283	2006 BA_{119}	—	January 26, 2006	Mount Lemmon	Mount Lemmon Survey	·	1.3 km	MPC · JPL
291284	2006 BO_{120}	—	January 26, 2006	Kitt Peak	Spacewatch	·	1.1 km	MPC · JPL
291285	2006 BQ_{122}	—	January 26, 2006	Kitt Peak	Spacewatch	·	1.1 km	MPC · JPL
291286	2006 BU_{125}	—	January 26, 2006	Kitt Peak	Spacewatch	·	2.1 km	MPC · JPL
291287	2006 BP_{126}	—	January 26, 2006	Kitt Peak	Spacewatch	·	2.5 km	MPC · JPL
291288	2006 BA_{127}	—	January 26, 2006	Kitt Peak	Spacewatch	·	1.4 km	MPC · JPL
291289	2006 BK_{127}	—	January 26, 2006	Kitt Peak	Spacewatch	·	1.6 km	MPC · JPL
291290	2006 BW_{129}	—	January 26, 2006	Kitt Peak	Spacewatch	·	580 m	MPC · JPL
291291	2006 BH_{130}	—	January 26, 2006	Kitt Peak	Spacewatch	HYG	4.0 km	MPC · JPL
291292	2006 BO_{130}	—	January 26, 2006	Kitt Peak	Spacewatch	·	1.2 km	MPC · JPL
291293	2006 BT_{130}	—	January 26, 2006	Kitt Peak	Spacewatch	·	1.8 km	MPC · JPL
291294	2006 BZ_{132}	—	January 26, 2006	Kitt Peak	Spacewatch	NYS	1.2 km	MPC · JPL
291295	2006 BF_{135}	—	January 27, 2006	Mount Lemmon	Mount Lemmon Survey	·	740 m	MPC · JPL
291296	2006 BA_{137}	—	January 28, 2006	Mount Lemmon	Mount Lemmon Survey	·	1.6 km	MPC · JPL
291297	2006 BS_{138}	—	January 28, 2006	Mount Lemmon	Mount Lemmon Survey	L5	15 km	MPC · JPL
291298	2006 BE_{139}	—	January 28, 2006	Mount Lemmon	Mount Lemmon Survey	·	2.3 km	MPC · JPL
291299	2006 BV_{140}	—	January 23, 2006	Catalina	CSS	EUP	5.0 km	MPC · JPL
291300	2006 BZ_{141}	—	January 26, 2006	Mount Lemmon	Mount Lemmon Survey	PAD	1.6 km	MPC · JPL

== 291301–291400 ==
back to top

Designation			Discovery			Properties		Ref
Permanent	Provisional	Named after	Date	Site	Discoverer(s)	Category	Diam.	Ref
291301	2006 BC_{142}	—	January 26, 2006	Kitt Peak	Spacewatch	L5	14 km	MPC · JPL
291302	2006 BE_{142}	—	January 26, 2006	Kitt Peak	Spacewatch	·	3.4 km	MPC · JPL
291303	2006 BF_{145}	—	January 23, 2006	Socorro	LINEAR	·	1.1 km	MPC · JPL
291304	2006 BF_{147}	—	January 26, 2006	Mount Lemmon	Mount Lemmon Survey	·	1.9 km	MPC · JPL
291305	2006 BS_{149}	—	January 24, 2006	Anderson Mesa	LONEOS	·	1.8 km	MPC · JPL
291306	2006 BT_{151}	—	January 25, 2006	Kitt Peak	Spacewatch	KOR	1.3 km	MPC · JPL
291307	2006 BE_{152}	—	January 25, 2006	Kitt Peak	Spacewatch	·	1.9 km	MPC · JPL
291308	2006 BS_{153}	—	January 25, 2006	Kitt Peak	Spacewatch	·	2.6 km	MPC · JPL
291309	2006 BF_{154}	—	January 25, 2006	Kitt Peak	Spacewatch	·	1.6 km	MPC · JPL
291310	2006 BO_{156}	—	January 25, 2006	Kitt Peak	Spacewatch	·	2.0 km	MPC · JPL
291311	2006 BV_{156}	—	January 25, 2006	Kitt Peak	Spacewatch	MAS	680 m	MPC · JPL
291312	2006 BE_{158}	—	January 25, 2006	Kitt Peak	Spacewatch	V	710 m	MPC · JPL
291313	2006 BV_{158}	—	January 26, 2006	Kitt Peak	Spacewatch	·	2.1 km	MPC · JPL
291314	2006 BC_{163}	—	January 26, 2006	Mount Lemmon	Mount Lemmon Survey	·	2.1 km	MPC · JPL
291315	2006 BA_{165}	—	January 26, 2006	Kitt Peak	Spacewatch	·	1.4 km	MPC · JPL
291316	2006 BE_{167}	—	January 26, 2006	Mount Lemmon	Mount Lemmon Survey	L5 · (291316) · 010	11 km	MPC · JPL
291317	2006 BT_{168}	—	January 26, 2006	Mount Lemmon	Mount Lemmon Survey	·	1.6 km	MPC · JPL
291318	2006 BQ_{169}	—	January 26, 2006	Mount Lemmon	Mount Lemmon Survey	NYS	1.1 km	MPC · JPL
291319	2006 BV_{170}	—	January 27, 2006	Kitt Peak	Spacewatch	V	830 m	MPC · JPL
291320	2006 BT_{171}	—	January 27, 2006	Kitt Peak	Spacewatch	MAS	780 m	MPC · JPL
291321	2006 BB_{176}	—	January 27, 2006	Kitt Peak	Spacewatch	·	1.6 km	MPC · JPL
291322	2006 BM_{182}	—	January 27, 2006	Mount Lemmon	Mount Lemmon Survey	·	2.4 km	MPC · JPL
291323	2006 BQ_{183}	—	January 27, 2006	Anderson Mesa	LONEOS	NYS	1.6 km	MPC · JPL
291324	2006 BL_{186}	—	January 28, 2006	Mount Lemmon	Mount Lemmon Survey	·	2.1 km	MPC · JPL
291325 de Tyard	2006 BG_{191}	de Tyard	January 29, 2006	Nogales	J.-C. Merlin	·	1.5 km	MPC · JPL
291326	2006 BR_{191}	—	January 30, 2006	Kitt Peak	Spacewatch	·	1.6 km	MPC · JPL
291327	2006 BQ_{194}	—	January 30, 2006	Kitt Peak	Spacewatch	L5	11 km	MPC · JPL
291328	2006 BZ_{195}	—	January 30, 2006	Kitt Peak	Spacewatch	·	2.1 km	MPC · JPL
291329	2006 BW_{197}	—	January 30, 2006	Kitt Peak	Spacewatch	·	1.3 km	MPC · JPL
291330	2006 BW_{199}	—	January 30, 2006	Kitt Peak	Spacewatch	THM	2.6 km	MPC · JPL
291331	2006 BX_{203}	—	January 31, 2006	Mount Lemmon	Mount Lemmon Survey	·	700 m	MPC · JPL
291332	2006 BA_{205}	—	January 31, 2006	Kitt Peak	Spacewatch	NYS	1.3 km	MPC · JPL
291333	2006 BL_{205}	—	January 31, 2006	Kitt Peak	Spacewatch	NYS	1.5 km	MPC · JPL
291334	2006 BG_{214}	—	January 23, 2006	Catalina	CSS	·	1.3 km	MPC · JPL
291335	2006 BQ_{214}	—	January 23, 2006	Catalina	CSS	·	1.2 km	MPC · JPL
291336	2006 BE_{215}	—	January 24, 2006	Socorro	LINEAR	·	3.7 km	MPC · JPL
291337	2006 BS_{216}	—	January 26, 2006	Catalina	CSS	·	4.4 km	MPC · JPL
291338	2006 BC_{217}	—	January 27, 2006	Anderson Mesa	LONEOS	·	3.1 km	MPC · JPL
291339	2006 BU_{217}	—	January 23, 2006	Catalina	CSS	·	2.4 km	MPC · JPL
291340	2006 BR_{218}	—	January 28, 2006	Mount Lemmon	Mount Lemmon Survey	NYS	1.7 km	MPC · JPL
291341	2006 BQ_{219}	—	January 28, 2006	Catalina	CSS	·	3.0 km	MPC · JPL
291342	2006 BE_{221}	—	January 30, 2006	Kitt Peak	Spacewatch	·	1.3 km	MPC · JPL
291343	2006 BH_{223}	—	January 30, 2006	Kitt Peak	Spacewatch	·	1.1 km	MPC · JPL
291344	2006 BO_{223}	—	January 30, 2006	Kitt Peak	Spacewatch	3:2	4.7 km	MPC · JPL
291345	2006 BW_{228}	—	January 31, 2006	Kitt Peak	Spacewatch	·	1.1 km	MPC · JPL
291346	2006 BH_{230}	—	January 31, 2006	Kitt Peak	Spacewatch	·	6.1 km	MPC · JPL
291347	2006 BP_{238}	—	September 3, 1999	Kitt Peak	Spacewatch	HOF	2.5 km	MPC · JPL
291348	2006 BH_{242}	—	January 31, 2006	Kitt Peak	Spacewatch	L5	10 km	MPC · JPL
291349	2006 BA_{248}	—	January 31, 2006	Kitt Peak	Spacewatch	KOR	1.7 km	MPC · JPL
291350	2006 BV_{248}	—	January 31, 2006	Kitt Peak	Spacewatch	THM	2.9 km	MPC · JPL
291351	2006 BH_{249}	—	January 31, 2006	Kitt Peak	Spacewatch	·	2.7 km	MPC · JPL
291352	2006 BP_{249}	—	January 31, 2006	Mount Lemmon	Mount Lemmon Survey	·	5.1 km	MPC · JPL
291353	2006 BZ_{252}	—	January 31, 2006	Kitt Peak	Spacewatch	·	1.3 km	MPC · JPL
291354	2006 BT_{254}	—	January 31, 2006	Kitt Peak	Spacewatch	·	840 m	MPC · JPL
291355	2006 BT_{257}	—	January 31, 2006	Kitt Peak	Spacewatch	·	1.2 km	MPC · JPL
291356	2006 BW_{258}	—	January 31, 2006	Kitt Peak	Spacewatch	MAS	640 m	MPC · JPL
291357	2006 BE_{259}	—	January 31, 2006	Kitt Peak	Spacewatch	(5)	1.3 km	MPC · JPL
291358	2006 BX_{259}	—	January 31, 2006	Mount Lemmon	Mount Lemmon Survey	·	1.5 km	MPC · JPL
291359	2006 BB_{260}	—	January 31, 2006	Kitt Peak	Spacewatch	·	910 m	MPC · JPL
291360	2006 BV_{261}	—	January 31, 2006	Kitt Peak	Spacewatch	·	1.5 km	MPC · JPL
291361	2006 BW_{261}	—	January 31, 2006	Kitt Peak	Spacewatch	EUN	1.4 km	MPC · JPL
291362	2006 BJ_{262}	—	January 31, 2006	Kitt Peak	Spacewatch	·	590 m	MPC · JPL
291363	2006 BD_{263}	—	January 31, 2006	Kitt Peak	Spacewatch	·	910 m	MPC · JPL
291364	2006 BP_{263}	—	January 31, 2006	Kitt Peak	Spacewatch	·	4.6 km	MPC · JPL
291365	2006 BB_{264}	—	January 31, 2006	Kitt Peak	Spacewatch	·	1.7 km	MPC · JPL
291366	2006 BQ_{265}	—	January 31, 2006	Kitt Peak	Spacewatch	·	2.1 km	MPC · JPL
291367	2006 BR_{265}	—	January 31, 2006	Kitt Peak	Spacewatch	NYS	1.1 km	MPC · JPL
291368	2006 BG_{268}	—	January 26, 2006	Catalina	CSS	EUP	4.7 km	MPC · JPL
291369	2006 BA_{274}	—	January 30, 2006	Kitt Peak	Spacewatch	·	1.1 km	MPC · JPL
291370	2006 BV_{274}	—	January 23, 2006	Mount Lemmon	Mount Lemmon Survey	·	1.9 km	MPC · JPL
291371	2006 BJ_{275}	—	January 30, 2006	Catalina	CSS	V	860 m	MPC · JPL
291372	2006 BA_{276}	—	January 26, 2006	Mount Lemmon	Mount Lemmon Survey	·	2.0 km	MPC · JPL
291373	2006 BD_{276}	—	January 30, 2006	Kitt Peak	Spacewatch	THM	2.5 km	MPC · JPL
291374	2006 BQ_{276}	—	January 30, 2006	Kitt Peak	Spacewatch	·	850 m	MPC · JPL
291375	2006 BG_{281}	—	January 31, 2006	Kitt Peak	Spacewatch	·	2.6 km	MPC · JPL
291376	2006 BX_{281}	—	January 26, 2006	Kitt Peak	Spacewatch	VER	2.8 km	MPC · JPL
291377	2006 BN_{282}	—	January 23, 2006	Kitt Peak	Spacewatch	KOR	1.4 km	MPC · JPL
291378	2006 CV_{7}	—	February 1, 2006	Mount Lemmon	Mount Lemmon Survey	·	2.3 km	MPC · JPL
291379	2006 CU_{12}	—	February 1, 2006	Kitt Peak	Spacewatch	·	6.7 km	MPC · JPL
291380	2006 CW_{12}	—	February 1, 2006	Kitt Peak	Spacewatch	·	1.0 km	MPC · JPL
291381	2006 CJ_{13}	—	February 1, 2006	Kitt Peak	Spacewatch	HYG	3.6 km	MPC · JPL
291382	2006 CY_{20}	—	February 1, 2006	Mount Lemmon	Mount Lemmon Survey	·	1.1 km	MPC · JPL
291383	2006 CO_{28}	—	February 2, 2006	Kitt Peak	Spacewatch	EOS	3.0 km	MPC · JPL
291384	2006 CF_{29}	—	February 2, 2006	Kitt Peak	Spacewatch	·	1.4 km	MPC · JPL
291385	2006 CZ_{32}	—	February 2, 2006	Kitt Peak	Spacewatch	L5	13 km	MPC · JPL
291386	2006 CF_{33}	—	February 2, 2006	Catalina	CSS	·	1.4 km	MPC · JPL
291387 Katiebouman	2006 CN_{36}	Katiebouman	February 2, 2006	Mount Lemmon	Mount Lemmon Survey	·	1.2 km	MPC · JPL
291388	2006 CM_{38}	—	February 2, 2006	Kitt Peak	Spacewatch	·	2.6 km	MPC · JPL
291389	2006 CO_{42}	—	February 2, 2006	Kitt Peak	Spacewatch	·	2.0 km	MPC · JPL
291390	2006 CG_{43}	—	February 2, 2006	Kitt Peak	Spacewatch	L5	9.4 km	MPC · JPL
291391	2006 CN_{45}	—	January 10, 2006	Mount Lemmon	Mount Lemmon Survey	·	1.4 km	MPC · JPL
291392	2006 CJ_{46}	—	February 3, 2006	Kitt Peak	Spacewatch	NYS	1.2 km	MPC · JPL
291393	2006 CP_{46}	—	February 3, 2006	Kitt Peak	Spacewatch	MAS	670 m	MPC · JPL
291394	2006 CG_{47}	—	February 3, 2006	Kitt Peak	Spacewatch	MAS	660 m	MPC · JPL
291395	2006 CX_{47}	—	February 3, 2006	Kitt Peak	Spacewatch	·	1.1 km	MPC · JPL
291396	2006 CT_{49}	—	February 3, 2006	Socorro	LINEAR	·	1.7 km	MPC · JPL
291397	2006 CM_{56}	—	February 4, 2006	Kitt Peak	Spacewatch	CYB	5.0 km	MPC · JPL
291398	2006 CH_{57}	—	February 4, 2006	Mount Lemmon	Mount Lemmon Survey	·	590 m	MPC · JPL
291399	2006 CD_{60}	—	February 11, 2006	Wrightwood	J. W. Young	·	840 m	MPC · JPL
291400	2006 CN_{60}	—	February 2, 2006	Catalina	CSS	·	2.5 km	MPC · JPL

== 291401–291500 ==
back to top

Designation			Discovery			Properties		Ref
Permanent	Provisional	Named after	Date	Site	Discoverer(s)	Category	Diam.	Ref
291401	2006 CB_{61}	—	February 7, 2006	Catalina	CSS	·	2.3 km	MPC · JPL
291402	2006 CU_{61}	—	February 3, 2006	Socorro	LINEAR	·	1.6 km	MPC · JPL
291403	2006 CL_{65}	—	February 6, 2006	Kitt Peak	Spacewatch	·	1.4 km	MPC · JPL
291404	2006 CV_{65}	—	February 2, 2006	Mount Lemmon	Mount Lemmon Survey	·	1.5 km	MPC · JPL
291405	2006 CH_{68}	—	February 6, 2006	Mount Lemmon	Mount Lemmon Survey	PHO	1.4 km	MPC · JPL
291406	2006 DP_{1}	—	February 20, 2006	Kitt Peak	Spacewatch	·	1.1 km	MPC · JPL
291407	2006 DY_{2}	—	February 20, 2006	Kitt Peak	Spacewatch	JUN	1.3 km	MPC · JPL
291408	2006 DK_{3}	—	February 20, 2006	Catalina	CSS	·	1.9 km	MPC · JPL
291409	2006 DP_{3}	—	February 20, 2006	Catalina	CSS	ERI	1.4 km	MPC · JPL
291410	2006 DG_{4}	—	February 20, 2006	Catalina	CSS	·	4.4 km	MPC · JPL
291411	2006 DZ_{5}	—	February 20, 2006	Catalina	CSS	NYS	1.2 km	MPC · JPL
291412	2006 DC_{6}	—	February 20, 2006	Catalina	CSS	·	4.8 km	MPC · JPL
291413	2006 DK_{7}	—	February 20, 2006	Mount Lemmon	Mount Lemmon Survey	·	2.2 km	MPC · JPL
291414	2006 DG_{8}	—	February 20, 2006	Kitt Peak	Spacewatch	LIX · fast	5.9 km	MPC · JPL
291415	2006 DA_{9}	—	February 21, 2006	Catalina	CSS	·	1.9 km	MPC · JPL
291416	2006 DX_{9}	—	February 21, 2006	Catalina	CSS	·	3.3 km	MPC · JPL
291417	2006 DV_{11}	—	February 20, 2006	Kitt Peak	Spacewatch	SUL	2.5 km	MPC · JPL
291418	2006 DD_{12}	—	February 20, 2006	Mount Lemmon	Mount Lemmon Survey	·	3.4 km	MPC · JPL
291419	2006 DL_{12}	—	February 21, 2006	Anderson Mesa	LONEOS	·	6.9 km	MPC · JPL
291420	2006 DN_{12}	—	February 21, 2006	Mount Lemmon	Mount Lemmon Survey	ADE	2.7 km	MPC · JPL
291421	2006 DP_{12}	—	February 21, 2006	Mount Lemmon	Mount Lemmon Survey	·	930 m	MPC · JPL
291422	2006 DN_{14}	—	February 21, 2006	Vicques	M. Ory	·	1.1 km	MPC · JPL
291423	2006 DM_{15}	—	February 20, 2006	Kitt Peak	Spacewatch	·	1.4 km	MPC · JPL
291424	2006 DZ_{22}	—	February 20, 2006	Kitt Peak	Spacewatch	MAS	1.1 km	MPC · JPL
291425	2006 DX_{23}	—	February 20, 2006	Kitt Peak	Spacewatch	KOR	1.7 km	MPC · JPL
291426	2006 DL_{25}	—	February 20, 2006	Kitt Peak	Spacewatch	KOR	1.5 km	MPC · JPL
291427	2006 DH_{26}	—	February 20, 2006	Catalina	CSS	·	1.6 km	MPC · JPL
291428	2006 DC_{27}	—	February 20, 2006	Kitt Peak	Spacewatch	NYS	1.2 km	MPC · JPL
291429	2006 DD_{27}	—	February 20, 2006	Kitt Peak	Spacewatch	L5	10 km	MPC · JPL
291430	2006 DO_{27}	—	February 20, 2006	Kitt Peak	Spacewatch	·	1.3 km	MPC · JPL
291431	2006 DT_{27}	—	February 20, 2006	Kitt Peak	Spacewatch	·	1.1 km	MPC · JPL
291432	2006 DV_{28}	—	February 20, 2006	Kitt Peak	Spacewatch	·	1.1 km	MPC · JPL
291433	2006 DY_{29}	—	February 20, 2006	Kitt Peak	Spacewatch	EOS	1.7 km	MPC · JPL
291434	2006 DG_{30}	—	February 20, 2006	Kitt Peak	Spacewatch	·	1.3 km	MPC · JPL
291435	2006 DV_{31}	—	February 20, 2006	Mount Lemmon	Mount Lemmon Survey	·	2.0 km	MPC · JPL
291436	2006 DX_{31}	—	February 20, 2006	Mount Lemmon	Mount Lemmon Survey	·	3.7 km	MPC · JPL
291437	2006 DO_{32}	—	February 20, 2006	Mount Lemmon	Mount Lemmon Survey	L5	10 km	MPC · JPL
291438	2006 DQ_{32}	—	February 20, 2006	Mount Lemmon	Mount Lemmon Survey	·	1.6 km	MPC · JPL
291439	2006 DP_{33}	—	February 20, 2006	Kitt Peak	Spacewatch	V	750 m	MPC · JPL
291440	2006 DQ_{33}	—	February 20, 2006	Kitt Peak	Spacewatch	·	1.8 km	MPC · JPL
291441	2006 DG_{34}	—	February 20, 2006	Kitt Peak	Spacewatch	·	1.7 km	MPC · JPL
291442	2006 DK_{34}	—	February 20, 2006	Kitt Peak	Spacewatch	·	3.6 km	MPC · JPL
291443	2006 DQ_{35}	—	February 20, 2006	Kitt Peak	Spacewatch	·	1.1 km	MPC · JPL
291444	2006 DW_{35}	—	February 20, 2006	Kitt Peak	Spacewatch	·	1.2 km	MPC · JPL
291445	2006 DK_{36}	—	February 20, 2006	Mount Lemmon	Mount Lemmon Survey	·	830 m	MPC · JPL
291446	2006 DY_{37}	—	February 20, 2006	Mount Lemmon	Mount Lemmon Survey	·	760 m	MPC · JPL
291447	2006 DH_{40}	—	February 22, 2006	Palomar	NEAT	·	3.5 km	MPC · JPL
291448	2006 DU_{40}	—	February 22, 2006	Catalina	CSS	·	1.8 km	MPC · JPL
291449	2006 DF_{42}	—	February 20, 2006	Kitt Peak	Spacewatch	HOF	3.2 km	MPC · JPL
291450	2006 DB_{45}	—	February 20, 2006	Kitt Peak	Spacewatch	MAS	830 m	MPC · JPL
291451	2006 DD_{46}	—	February 20, 2006	Kitt Peak	Spacewatch	·	2.0 km	MPC · JPL
291452	2006 DG_{47}	—	February 21, 2006	Mount Lemmon	Mount Lemmon Survey	NYS	1.1 km	MPC · JPL
291453	2006 DC_{48}	—	February 21, 2006	Mount Lemmon	Mount Lemmon Survey	·	1.9 km	MPC · JPL
291454	2006 DE_{48}	—	February 21, 2006	Mount Lemmon	Mount Lemmon Survey	·	2.4 km	MPC · JPL
291455	2006 DV_{50}	—	February 23, 2006	Kitt Peak	Spacewatch	·	1.2 km	MPC · JPL
291456	2006 DE_{51}	—	February 23, 2006	Kitt Peak	Spacewatch	V	990 m	MPC · JPL
291457	2006 DJ_{52}	—	February 24, 2006	Kitt Peak	Spacewatch	KOR	1.9 km	MPC · JPL
291458	2006 DY_{52}	—	February 24, 2006	Kitt Peak	Spacewatch	NYS	1.0 km	MPC · JPL
291459	2006 DP_{54}	—	February 24, 2006	Kitt Peak	Spacewatch	·	700 m	MPC · JPL
291460	2006 DL_{58}	—	February 24, 2006	Mount Lemmon	Mount Lemmon Survey	·	930 m	MPC · JPL
291461	2006 DY_{59}	—	February 24, 2006	Kitt Peak	Spacewatch	·	1.3 km	MPC · JPL
291462	2006 DY_{60}	—	February 24, 2006	Mount Lemmon	Mount Lemmon Survey	NYS	1.0 km	MPC · JPL
291463	2006 DA_{61}	—	February 24, 2006	Kitt Peak	Spacewatch	·	2.6 km	MPC · JPL
291464	2006 DH_{64}	—	February 20, 2006	Socorro	LINEAR	·	1.8 km	MPC · JPL
291465	2006 DF_{66}	—	February 22, 2006	Catalina	CSS	EMA	4.5 km	MPC · JPL
291466	2006 DE_{69}	—	February 20, 2006	Socorro	LINEAR	·	1.6 km	MPC · JPL
291467	2006 DS_{73}	—	February 23, 2006	Kitt Peak	Spacewatch	·	940 m	MPC · JPL
291468	2006 DG_{75}	—	February 24, 2006	Kitt Peak	Spacewatch	·	1.6 km	MPC · JPL
291469	2006 DR_{81}	—	February 24, 2006	Kitt Peak	Spacewatch	·	2.0 km	MPC · JPL
291470	2006 DE_{83}	—	February 24, 2006	Kitt Peak	Spacewatch	·	1.3 km	MPC · JPL
291471	2006 DY_{83}	—	February 24, 2006	Kitt Peak	Spacewatch	L5	9.5 km	MPC · JPL
291472	2006 DV_{85}	—	February 24, 2006	Kitt Peak	Spacewatch	·	4.7 km	MPC · JPL
291473	2006 DF_{86}	—	February 24, 2006	Kitt Peak	Spacewatch	MAS	890 m	MPC · JPL
291474	2006 DR_{87}	—	February 24, 2006	Kitt Peak	Spacewatch	·	1.6 km	MPC · JPL
291475	2006 DW_{88}	—	February 24, 2006	Kitt Peak	Spacewatch	MAS	770 m	MPC · JPL
291476	2006 DU_{89}	—	February 24, 2006	Mount Lemmon	Mount Lemmon Survey	·	2.1 km	MPC · JPL
291477	2006 DC_{90}	—	February 24, 2006	Kitt Peak	Spacewatch	·	1.5 km	MPC · JPL
291478	2006 DP_{92}	—	February 24, 2006	Mount Lemmon	Mount Lemmon Survey	·	2.4 km	MPC · JPL
291479	2006 DB_{93}	—	February 24, 2006	Kitt Peak	Spacewatch	·	1.3 km	MPC · JPL
291480	2006 DU_{93}	—	February 24, 2006	Kitt Peak	Spacewatch	·	2.9 km	MPC · JPL
291481	2006 DX_{93}	—	February 24, 2006	Kitt Peak	Spacewatch	·	660 m	MPC · JPL
291482	2006 DJ_{96}	—	February 24, 2006	Kitt Peak	Spacewatch	THM	2.5 km	MPC · JPL
291483	2006 DJ_{99}	—	February 25, 2006	Kitt Peak	Spacewatch	·	2.0 km	MPC · JPL
291484	2006 DK_{102}	—	February 25, 2006	Mount Lemmon	Mount Lemmon Survey	(3460)	3.9 km	MPC · JPL
291485	2006 DU_{103}	—	February 25, 2006	Mount Lemmon	Mount Lemmon Survey	L5	10 km	MPC · JPL
291486	2006 DP_{107}	—	February 25, 2006	Kitt Peak	Spacewatch	·	3.8 km	MPC · JPL
291487	2006 DF_{109}	—	November 11, 2004	Kitt Peak	Spacewatch	·	1.4 km	MPC · JPL
291488	2006 DJ_{109}	—	February 25, 2006	Kitt Peak	Spacewatch	V	760 m	MPC · JPL
291489	2006 DQ_{109}	—	February 25, 2006	Kitt Peak	Spacewatch	·	2.1 km	MPC · JPL
291490	2006 DS_{117}	—	February 27, 2006	Kitt Peak	Spacewatch	·	1.4 km	MPC · JPL
291491	2006 DA_{118}	—	February 27, 2006	Kitt Peak	Spacewatch	·	1.7 km	MPC · JPL
291492	2006 DU_{119}	—	February 20, 2006	Socorro	LINEAR	·	2.4 km	MPC · JPL
291493	2006 DH_{120}	—	February 21, 2006	Anderson Mesa	LONEOS	V	880 m	MPC · JPL
291494	2006 DQ_{120}	—	February 21, 2006	Catalina	CSS	LUT	7.3 km	MPC · JPL
291495	2006 DA_{131}	—	February 25, 2006	Kitt Peak	Spacewatch	L5	10 km	MPC · JPL
291496	2006 DA_{139}	—	February 25, 2006	Kitt Peak	Spacewatch	·	1.7 km	MPC · JPL
291497	2006 DH_{140}	—	February 25, 2006	Kitt Peak	Spacewatch	EOS	2.2 km	MPC · JPL
291498	2006 DT_{142}	—	February 25, 2006	Kitt Peak	Spacewatch	·	3.4 km	MPC · JPL
291499	2006 DU_{143}	—	February 25, 2006	Mount Lemmon	Mount Lemmon Survey	(5)	1.2 km	MPC · JPL
291500	2006 DR_{147}	—	February 25, 2006	Kitt Peak	Spacewatch	·	1.2 km	MPC · JPL

== 291501–291600 ==
back to top

Designation			Discovery			Properties		Ref
Permanent	Provisional	Named after	Date	Site	Discoverer(s)	Category	Diam.	Ref
291501	2006 DL_{154}	—	February 25, 2006	Kitt Peak	Spacewatch	V	890 m	MPC · JPL
291502	2006 DC_{155}	—	February 25, 2006	Kitt Peak	Spacewatch	·	1.2 km	MPC · JPL
291503	2006 DX_{155}	—	February 26, 2006	Kitt Peak	Spacewatch	·	2.4 km	MPC · JPL
291504	2006 DN_{156}	—	February 27, 2006	Kitt Peak	Spacewatch	MAS	1.1 km	MPC · JPL
291505	2006 DE_{174}	—	February 27, 2006	Kitt Peak	Spacewatch	THM	2.6 km	MPC · JPL
291506	2006 DM_{174}	—	February 27, 2006	Kitt Peak	Spacewatch	MAS	880 m	MPC · JPL
291507	2006 DE_{178}	—	February 27, 2006	Mount Lemmon	Mount Lemmon Survey	·	910 m	MPC · JPL
291508	2006 DK_{186}	—	February 27, 2006	Kitt Peak	Spacewatch	·	2.7 km	MPC · JPL
291509	2006 DM_{191}	—	February 27, 2006	Kitt Peak	Spacewatch	·	1.3 km	MPC · JPL
291510	2006 DJ_{192}	—	February 27, 2006	Kitt Peak	Spacewatch	·	1.8 km	MPC · JPL
291511	2006 DS_{195}	—	February 20, 2006	Catalina	CSS	LUT	10 km	MPC · JPL
291512	2006 DL_{198}	—	February 27, 2006	Mount Lemmon	Mount Lemmon Survey	NYS	1.4 km	MPC · JPL
291513	2006 DY_{200}	—	February 25, 2006	Anderson Mesa	LONEOS	JUN	1.6 km	MPC · JPL
291514	2006 DA_{208}	—	February 25, 2006	Kitt Peak	Spacewatch	·	1.8 km	MPC · JPL
291515	2006 DO_{209}	—	February 28, 2006	Mount Lemmon	Mount Lemmon Survey	·	970 m	MPC · JPL
291516	2006 DT_{209}	—	February 28, 2006	Mount Lemmon	Mount Lemmon Survey	·	3.1 km	MPC · JPL
291517	2006 DS_{211}	—	February 24, 2006	Kitt Peak	Spacewatch	·	1.6 km	MPC · JPL
291518	2006 DW_{213}	—	February 24, 2006	Palomar	NEAT	·	1.9 km	MPC · JPL
291519	2006 DF_{214}	—	February 24, 2006	Mount Lemmon	Mount Lemmon Survey	L5	10 km	MPC · JPL
291520	2006 EZ	—	March 4, 2006	Catalina	CSS	H	650 m	MPC · JPL
291521	2006 EM_{2}	—	March 3, 2006	Mount Nyukasa	Japan Aerospace Exploration Agency	·	2.0 km	MPC · JPL
291522	2006 EB_{7}	—	March 2, 2006	Kitt Peak	Spacewatch	·	3.1 km	MPC · JPL
291523	2006 EW_{8}	—	March 2, 2006	Kitt Peak	Spacewatch	·	1.6 km	MPC · JPL
291524	2006 EY_{8}	—	March 2, 2006	Kitt Peak	Spacewatch	·	2.2 km	MPC · JPL
291525	2006 EA_{10}	—	March 2, 2006	Kitt Peak	Spacewatch	RAF	2.4 km	MPC · JPL
291526	2006 EL_{10}	—	March 2, 2006	Kitt Peak	Spacewatch	·	1.6 km	MPC · JPL
291527	2006 EW_{13}	—	February 20, 2006	Kitt Peak	Spacewatch	EUN	1.1 km	MPC · JPL
291528	2006 EX_{13}	—	March 2, 2006	Kitt Peak	Spacewatch	·	2.1 km	MPC · JPL
291529	2006 ET_{15}	—	March 2, 2006	Kitt Peak	Spacewatch	·	1.7 km	MPC · JPL
291530	2006 EY_{15}	—	March 2, 2006	Kitt Peak	Spacewatch	·	650 m	MPC · JPL
291531	2006 EV_{20}	—	March 3, 2006	Kitt Peak	Spacewatch	·	2.1 km	MPC · JPL
291532	2006 EA_{22}	—	March 3, 2006	Kitt Peak	Spacewatch	·	680 m	MPC · JPL
291533	2006 EL_{26}	—	March 3, 2006	Mount Lemmon	Mount Lemmon Survey	·	1.1 km	MPC · JPL
291534	2006 EE_{31}	—	March 3, 2006	Kitt Peak	Spacewatch	·	4.0 km	MPC · JPL
291535	2006 EJ_{36}	—	March 3, 2006	Mount Lemmon	Mount Lemmon Survey	HOF	3.1 km	MPC · JPL
291536	2006 EJ_{40}	—	March 4, 2006	Kitt Peak	Spacewatch	·	1.3 km	MPC · JPL
291537	2006 EK_{40}	—	March 4, 2006	Kitt Peak	Spacewatch	·	2.2 km	MPC · JPL
291538	2006 ER_{40}	—	March 4, 2006	Kitt Peak	Spacewatch	·	1.0 km	MPC · JPL
291539	2006 EZ_{41}	—	March 4, 2006	Catalina	CSS	·	2.5 km	MPC · JPL
291540	2006 EY_{42}	—	March 4, 2006	Kitt Peak	Spacewatch	HOF	4.2 km	MPC · JPL
291541	2006 EC_{44}	—	March 5, 2006	Mount Lemmon	Mount Lemmon Survey	·	1.6 km	MPC · JPL
291542	2006 EK_{47}	—	March 4, 2006	Kitt Peak	Spacewatch	·	1.1 km	MPC · JPL
291543	2006 EW_{49}	—	March 4, 2006	Kitt Peak	Spacewatch	·	2.9 km	MPC · JPL
291544	2006 EX_{51}	—	March 4, 2006	Kitt Peak	Spacewatch	·	1.5 km	MPC · JPL
291545	2006 EA_{52}	—	March 4, 2006	Kitt Peak	Spacewatch	·	1.6 km	MPC · JPL
291546	2006 EO_{54}	—	March 5, 2006	Kitt Peak	Spacewatch	·	2.8 km	MPC · JPL
291547	2006 EP_{54}	—	March 5, 2006	Kitt Peak	Spacewatch	·	3.2 km	MPC · JPL
291548	2006 EG_{55}	—	March 5, 2006	Kitt Peak	Spacewatch	NYS	1.3 km	MPC · JPL
291549	2006 EG_{63}	—	March 5, 2006	Kitt Peak	Spacewatch	·	3.0 km	MPC · JPL
291550	2006 EA_{64}	—	March 5, 2006	Kitt Peak	Spacewatch	·	2.9 km	MPC · JPL
291551	2006 EA_{72}	—	March 5, 2006	Kitt Peak	Spacewatch	·	730 m	MPC · JPL
291552	2006 EK_{72}	—	March 5, 2006	Kitt Peak	Spacewatch	·	1.4 km	MPC · JPL
291553	2006 EW_{72}	—	March 2, 2006	Mount Lemmon	Mount Lemmon Survey	·	1.5 km	MPC · JPL
291554	2006 EC_{73}	—	March 4, 2006	Kitt Peak	Spacewatch	·	2.3 km	MPC · JPL
291555	2006 EE_{73}	—	March 4, 2006	Mount Lemmon	Mount Lemmon Survey	·	1.7 km	MPC · JPL
291556	2006 FT_{1}	—	March 22, 2006	Catalina	CSS	·	1.0 km	MPC · JPL
291557	2006 FC_{2}	—	March 23, 2006	Mount Lemmon	Mount Lemmon Survey	L5	13 km	MPC · JPL
291558	2006 FM_{3}	—	March 23, 2006	Kitt Peak	Spacewatch	·	1.0 km	MPC · JPL
291559	2006 FH_{5}	—	March 23, 2006	Kitt Peak	Spacewatch	·	890 m	MPC · JPL
291560	2006 FB_{9}	—	March 23, 2006	Kitt Peak	Spacewatch	·	2.6 km	MPC · JPL
291561	2006 FQ_{10}	—	March 21, 2006	Mount Lemmon	Mount Lemmon Survey	NYS	1.1 km	MPC · JPL
291562	2006 FV_{18}	—	March 23, 2006	Mount Lemmon	Mount Lemmon Survey	V	820 m	MPC · JPL
291563	2006 FH_{26}	—	March 24, 2006	Mount Lemmon	Mount Lemmon Survey	·	1.3 km	MPC · JPL
291564	2006 FJ_{28}	—	March 24, 2006	Mount Lemmon	Mount Lemmon Survey	·	2.7 km	MPC · JPL
291565	2006 FF_{29}	—	March 24, 2006	Mount Lemmon	Mount Lemmon Survey	·	2.3 km	MPC · JPL
291566	2006 FS_{29}	—	March 24, 2006	Mount Lemmon	Mount Lemmon Survey	·	1.8 km	MPC · JPL
291567	2006 FR_{31}	—	March 25, 2006	Kitt Peak	Spacewatch	EOS	2.4 km	MPC · JPL
291568	2006 FS_{31}	—	March 25, 2006	Kitt Peak	Spacewatch	·	880 m	MPC · JPL
291569	2006 FW_{31}	—	March 25, 2006	Kitt Peak	Spacewatch	·	1.1 km	MPC · JPL
291570	2006 FJ_{32}	—	March 25, 2006	Mount Lemmon	Mount Lemmon Survey	·	4.5 km	MPC · JPL
291571	2006 FO_{32}	—	March 25, 2006	Kitt Peak	Spacewatch	·	1.4 km	MPC · JPL
291572	2006 FC_{34}	—	March 24, 2006	Socorro	LINEAR	·	3.8 km	MPC · JPL
291573	2006 FL_{35}	—	March 24, 2006	Kitt Peak	Spacewatch	·	1.0 km	MPC · JPL
291574	2006 FY_{36}	—	March 23, 2006	Catalina	CSS	PHO	3.6 km	MPC · JPL
291575	2006 FK_{39}	—	March 24, 2006	Kitt Peak	Spacewatch	·	3.8 km	MPC · JPL
291576	2006 FW_{41}	—	March 26, 2006	Mount Lemmon	Mount Lemmon Survey	·	910 m	MPC · JPL
291577	2006 FF_{42}	—	March 26, 2006	Mount Lemmon	Mount Lemmon Survey	·	1.6 km	MPC · JPL
291578	2006 FP_{42}	—	March 26, 2006	Mount Lemmon	Mount Lemmon Survey	·	960 m	MPC · JPL
291579	2006 FG_{47}	—	March 23, 2006	Catalina	CSS	EUN	1.5 km	MPC · JPL
291580	2006 FZ_{49}	—	March 29, 2006	Črni Vrh	Skvarč, J.	·	1.5 km	MPC · JPL
291581	2006 FZ_{52}	—	March 26, 2006	Mount Lemmon	Mount Lemmon Survey	·	550 m	MPC · JPL
291582	2006 FL_{53}	—	March 26, 2006	Kitt Peak	Spacewatch	NYS	1.4 km	MPC · JPL
291583	2006 GN_{1}	—	April 2, 2006	Mount Lemmon	Mount Lemmon Survey	·	4.3 km	MPC · JPL
291584	2006 GG_{4}	—	April 2, 2006	Kitt Peak	Spacewatch	·	520 m	MPC · JPL
291585	2006 GD_{6}	—	April 2, 2006	Kitt Peak	Spacewatch	·	2.4 km	MPC · JPL
291586	2006 GF_{8}	—	April 2, 2006	Kitt Peak	Spacewatch	·	860 m	MPC · JPL
291587	2006 GZ_{9}	—	April 2, 2006	Kitt Peak	Spacewatch	·	1.8 km	MPC · JPL
291588	2006 GD_{12}	—	April 2, 2006	Kitt Peak	Spacewatch	·	1.8 km	MPC · JPL
291589	2006 GQ_{13}	—	April 2, 2006	Kitt Peak	Spacewatch	·	1.8 km	MPC · JPL
291590	2006 GH_{14}	—	April 2, 2006	Kitt Peak	Spacewatch	·	1.7 km	MPC · JPL
291591	2006 GQ_{16}	—	April 2, 2006	Kitt Peak	Spacewatch	(5)	1.2 km	MPC · JPL
291592	2006 GD_{19}	—	April 2, 2006	Kitt Peak	Spacewatch	MAR	1.6 km	MPC · JPL
291593	2006 GY_{19}	—	April 2, 2006	Kitt Peak	Spacewatch	·	2.9 km	MPC · JPL
291594	2006 GD_{20}	—	April 2, 2006	Kitt Peak	Spacewatch	·	620 m	MPC · JPL
291595	2006 GY_{20}	—	April 2, 2006	Kitt Peak	Spacewatch	EOS	2.5 km	MPC · JPL
291596	2006 GJ_{22}	—	April 2, 2006	Kitt Peak	Spacewatch	·	1.7 km	MPC · JPL
291597	2006 GD_{23}	—	April 2, 2006	Kitt Peak	Spacewatch	MAS	930 m	MPC · JPL
291598	2006 GS_{29}	—	April 2, 2006	Kitt Peak	Spacewatch	·	950 m	MPC · JPL
291599	2006 GA_{30}	—	April 2, 2006	Mount Lemmon	Mount Lemmon Survey	BRG	1.7 km	MPC · JPL
291600	2006 GH_{30}	—	April 2, 2006	Mount Lemmon	Mount Lemmon Survey	NYS	900 m	MPC · JPL

== 291601–291700 ==
back to top

Designation			Discovery			Properties		Ref
Permanent	Provisional	Named after	Date	Site	Discoverer(s)	Category	Diam.	Ref
291601	2006 GD_{31}	—	April 2, 2006	Kitt Peak	Spacewatch	·	1.8 km	MPC · JPL
291602	2006 GG_{31}	—	April 2, 2006	Kitt Peak	Spacewatch	·	1.2 km	MPC · JPL
291603	2006 GE_{34}	—	April 7, 2006	Kitt Peak	Spacewatch	·	3.1 km	MPC · JPL
291604	2006 GQ_{35}	—	April 7, 2006	Catalina	CSS	·	2.1 km	MPC · JPL
291605	2006 GV_{35}	—	April 7, 2006	Catalina	CSS	EUN	2.0 km	MPC · JPL
291606	2006 GF_{36}	—	April 7, 2006	Anderson Mesa	LONEOS	·	2.0 km	MPC · JPL
291607	2006 GM_{38}	—	April 2, 2006	Anderson Mesa	LONEOS	THB	6.2 km	MPC · JPL
291608	2006 GG_{39}	—	April 9, 2006	Kitt Peak	Spacewatch	·	770 m	MPC · JPL
291609	2006 GL_{42}	—	April 13, 2006	Palomar	NEAT	·	1.6 km	MPC · JPL
291610	2006 GQ_{43}	—	April 2, 2006	Mount Lemmon	Mount Lemmon Survey	·	3.4 km	MPC · JPL
291611	2006 GN_{46}	—	April 8, 2006	Kitt Peak	Spacewatch	·	1.1 km	MPC · JPL
291612	2006 GW_{46}	—	April 9, 2006	Kitt Peak	Spacewatch	MAS	990 m	MPC · JPL
291613	2006 GX_{46}	—	April 9, 2006	Kitt Peak	Spacewatch	·	960 m	MPC · JPL
291614	2006 GE_{48}	—	April 9, 2006	Kitt Peak	Spacewatch	·	590 m	MPC · JPL
291615	2006 GD_{54}	—	April 2, 2006	Kitt Peak	Spacewatch	·	1.9 km	MPC · JPL
291616	2006 HC_{1}	—	April 18, 2006	Anderson Mesa	LONEOS	EUP	6.2 km	MPC · JPL
291617	2006 HF_{1}	—	April 18, 2006	Anderson Mesa	LONEOS	·	4.6 km	MPC · JPL
291618	2006 HV_{1}	—	April 18, 2006	Palomar	NEAT	·	1.9 km	MPC · JPL
291619	2006 HP_{2}	—	April 18, 2006	Kitt Peak	Spacewatch	·	1.0 km	MPC · JPL
291620	2006 HN_{4}	—	April 19, 2006	Anderson Mesa	LONEOS	·	3.8 km	MPC · JPL
291621	2006 HP_{5}	—	April 19, 2006	Palomar	NEAT	·	1.8 km	MPC · JPL
291622	2006 HW_{6}	—	April 18, 2006	Catalina	CSS	HIL · 3:2	8.9 km	MPC · JPL
291623	2006 HM_{7}	—	April 19, 2006	Palomar	NEAT	·	1.1 km	MPC · JPL
291624	2006 HM_{9}	—	April 19, 2006	Anderson Mesa	LONEOS	·	6.0 km	MPC · JPL
291625	2006 HV_{10}	—	April 19, 2006	Kitt Peak	Spacewatch	·	1.6 km	MPC · JPL
291626	2006 HO_{11}	—	April 19, 2006	Kitt Peak	Spacewatch	·	1.9 km	MPC · JPL
291627	2006 HF_{12}	—	April 19, 2006	Kitt Peak	Spacewatch	·	4.0 km	MPC · JPL
291628	2006 HL_{12}	—	April 19, 2006	Kitt Peak	Spacewatch	·	1.6 km	MPC · JPL
291629	2006 HM_{13}	—	April 19, 2006	Palomar	NEAT	·	1.8 km	MPC · JPL
291630	2006 HS_{14}	—	April 19, 2006	Mount Lemmon	Mount Lemmon Survey	KRM	2.8 km	MPC · JPL
291631	2006 HG_{15}	—	April 19, 2006	Palomar	NEAT	·	800 m	MPC · JPL
291632	2006 HG_{16}	—	April 20, 2006	Kitt Peak	Spacewatch	·	870 m	MPC · JPL
291633 Heyun	2006 HY_{20}	Heyun	April 19, 2006	Lulin	Q. Ye, Lin, H.-C.	·	2.8 km	MPC · JPL
291634	2006 HU_{21}	—	April 20, 2006	Kitt Peak	Spacewatch	V	830 m	MPC · JPL
291635	2006 HY_{21}	—	April 20, 2006	Kitt Peak	Spacewatch	·	1.4 km	MPC · JPL
291636	2006 HM_{23}	—	April 20, 2006	Kitt Peak	Spacewatch	·	1.3 km	MPC · JPL
291637	2006 HU_{25}	—	April 20, 2006	Kitt Peak	Spacewatch	PHO	2.6 km	MPC · JPL
291638	2006 HR_{26}	—	April 20, 2006	Kitt Peak	Spacewatch	·	1.8 km	MPC · JPL
291639	2006 HU_{27}	—	April 20, 2006	Kitt Peak	Spacewatch	·	1.3 km	MPC · JPL
291640	2006 HY_{28}	—	April 21, 2006	Kitt Peak	Spacewatch	·	1.6 km	MPC · JPL
291641	2006 HL_{31}	—	April 18, 2006	Palomar	NEAT	·	1.3 km	MPC · JPL
291642	2006 HD_{37}	—	April 21, 2006	Kitt Peak	Spacewatch	·	1.6 km	MPC · JPL
291643	2006 HT_{38}	—	April 21, 2006	Kitt Peak	Spacewatch	·	930 m	MPC · JPL
291644	2006 HH_{39}	—	April 21, 2006	Kitt Peak	Spacewatch	NYS	1.0 km	MPC · JPL
291645	2006 HR_{41}	—	April 21, 2006	Kitt Peak	Spacewatch	·	2.1 km	MPC · JPL
291646	2006 HY_{43}	—	April 24, 2006	Kitt Peak	Spacewatch	·	2.3 km	MPC · JPL
291647	2006 HA_{46}	—	April 25, 2006	Kitt Peak	Spacewatch	THM	2.3 km	MPC · JPL
291648	2006 HM_{47}	—	April 24, 2006	Kitt Peak	Spacewatch	·	3.1 km	MPC · JPL
291649	2006 HB_{49}	—	April 25, 2006	Kitt Peak	Spacewatch	·	2.4 km	MPC · JPL
291650	2006 HY_{49}	—	April 26, 2006	Kitt Peak	Spacewatch	·	1.5 km	MPC · JPL
291651	2006 HR_{50}	—	April 26, 2006	Mount Lemmon	Mount Lemmon Survey	(12739)	1.9 km	MPC · JPL
291652	2006 HE_{51}	—	April 24, 2006	Reedy Creek	J. Broughton	·	940 m	MPC · JPL
291653	2006 HK_{52}	—	April 18, 2006	Anderson Mesa	LONEOS	·	1.7 km	MPC · JPL
291654	2006 HF_{53}	—	April 19, 2006	Palomar	NEAT	H	720 m	MPC · JPL
291655	2006 HQ_{54}	—	April 21, 2006	Catalina	CSS	·	7.1 km	MPC · JPL
291656	2006 HK_{55}	—	April 23, 2006	Anderson Mesa	LONEOS	·	2.3 km	MPC · JPL
291657	2006 HF_{56}	—	April 26, 2006	Kitt Peak	Spacewatch	·	900 m	MPC · JPL
291658	2006 HR_{61}	—	April 24, 2006	Kitt Peak	Spacewatch	·	1.9 km	MPC · JPL
291659	2006 HX_{62}	—	April 24, 2006	Kitt Peak	Spacewatch	·	1.1 km	MPC · JPL
291660	2006 HL_{65}	—	April 24, 2006	Kitt Peak	Spacewatch	·	2.2 km	MPC · JPL
291661	2006 HZ_{66}	—	April 24, 2006	Kitt Peak	Spacewatch	MAS	750 m	MPC · JPL
291662	2006 HF_{67}	—	April 24, 2006	Kitt Peak	Spacewatch	·	3.0 km	MPC · JPL
291663	2006 HL_{67}	—	April 24, 2006	Kitt Peak	Spacewatch	NYS	1.0 km	MPC · JPL
291664	2006 HE_{69}	—	April 24, 2006	Mount Lemmon	Mount Lemmon Survey	·	2.9 km	MPC · JPL
291665	2006 HN_{69}	—	April 24, 2006	Mount Lemmon	Mount Lemmon Survey	·	3.9 km	MPC · JPL
291666	2006 HS_{69}	—	April 24, 2006	Anderson Mesa	LONEOS	·	1.9 km	MPC · JPL
291667	2006 HU_{69}	—	April 24, 2006	Kitt Peak	Spacewatch	·	5.2 km	MPC · JPL
291668	2006 HV_{73}	—	April 25, 2006	Kitt Peak	Spacewatch	·	4.5 km	MPC · JPL
291669	2006 HV_{74}	—	April 25, 2006	Kitt Peak	Spacewatch	·	1.9 km	MPC · JPL
291670	2006 HV_{75}	—	April 25, 2006	Kitt Peak	Spacewatch	·	1.6 km	MPC · JPL
291671	2006 HB_{79}	—	April 26, 2006	Kitt Peak	Spacewatch	·	1.8 km	MPC · JPL
291672	2006 HJ_{79}	—	April 26, 2006	Kitt Peak	Spacewatch	·	1.9 km	MPC · JPL
291673	2006 HU_{79}	—	April 26, 2006	Kitt Peak	Spacewatch	·	1.5 km	MPC · JPL
291674	2006 HG_{80}	—	April 26, 2006	Kitt Peak	Spacewatch	·	1.4 km	MPC · JPL
291675	2006 HX_{82}	—	April 26, 2006	Kitt Peak	Spacewatch	·	1.6 km	MPC · JPL
291676	2006 HF_{83}	—	April 26, 2006	Kitt Peak	Spacewatch	HIL · 3:2	7.0 km	MPC · JPL
291677	2006 HM_{84}	—	April 26, 2006	Kitt Peak	Spacewatch	·	1.2 km	MPC · JPL
291678	2006 HW_{84}	—	April 26, 2006	Kitt Peak	Spacewatch	GEF	1.7 km	MPC · JPL
291679	2006 HF_{89}	—	April 19, 2006	Catalina	CSS	·	5.3 km	MPC · JPL
291680	2006 HK_{91}	—	April 29, 2006	Kitt Peak	Spacewatch	·	870 m	MPC · JPL
291681	2006 HT_{92}	—	April 29, 2006	Kitt Peak	Spacewatch	·	1.2 km	MPC · JPL
291682	2006 HW_{95}	—	April 30, 2006	Kitt Peak	Spacewatch	AST	2.8 km	MPC · JPL
291683	2006 HM_{96}	—	April 30, 2006	Kitt Peak	Spacewatch	NYS	1.5 km	MPC · JPL
291684	2006 HK_{97}	—	April 30, 2006	Kitt Peak	Spacewatch	KOR	1.4 km	MPC · JPL
291685	2006 HD_{98}	—	April 30, 2006	Kitt Peak	Spacewatch	·	2.8 km	MPC · JPL
291686	2006 HM_{99}	—	April 30, 2006	Kitt Peak	Spacewatch	(12739)	1.7 km	MPC · JPL
291687	2006 HT_{99}	—	April 30, 2006	Kitt Peak	Spacewatch	HOF	3.6 km	MPC · JPL
291688	2006 HC_{100}	—	April 30, 2006	Kitt Peak	Spacewatch	NYS	1.0 km	MPC · JPL
291689	2006 HA_{103}	—	April 30, 2006	Kitt Peak	Spacewatch	·	820 m	MPC · JPL
291690	2006 HK_{104}	—	April 30, 2006	Kitt Peak	Spacewatch	(1547)	2.2 km	MPC · JPL
291691	2006 HT_{105}	—	April 28, 2006	Socorro	LINEAR	·	1.1 km	MPC · JPL
291692	2006 HZ_{107}	—	April 30, 2006	Kitt Peak	Spacewatch	·	2.3 km	MPC · JPL
291693	2006 HB_{108}	—	April 30, 2006	Kitt Peak	Spacewatch	AGN	1.3 km	MPC · JPL
291694	2006 HF_{110}	—	April 24, 2006	Siding Spring	SSS	PHO	1.8 km	MPC · JPL
291695	2006 HL_{111}	—	April 26, 2006	Siding Spring	SSS	·	3.2 km	MPC · JPL
291696	2006 HK_{116}	—	April 26, 2006	Kitt Peak	Spacewatch	AGN	1.3 km	MPC · JPL
291697	2006 HP_{116}	—	April 26, 2006	Kitt Peak	Spacewatch	AST	1.6 km	MPC · JPL
291698	2006 HR_{116}	—	April 26, 2006	Kitt Peak	Spacewatch	MAS	770 m	MPC · JPL
291699	2006 HP_{117}	—	April 29, 2006	Kitt Peak	Spacewatch	·	1.9 km	MPC · JPL
291700	2006 HV_{152}	—	April 26, 2006	Kitt Peak	Spacewatch	·	750 m	MPC · JPL

== 291701–291800 ==
back to top

Designation			Discovery			Properties		Ref
Permanent	Provisional	Named after	Date	Site	Discoverer(s)	Category	Diam.	Ref
291701	2006 HA_{154}	—	April 19, 2006	Mount Lemmon	Mount Lemmon Survey	·	980 m	MPC · JPL
291702	2006 JM_{2}	—	May 1, 2006	Kitt Peak	Spacewatch	·	2.2 km	MPC · JPL
291703	2006 JQ_{4}	—	May 2, 2006	Mount Lemmon	Mount Lemmon Survey	·	2.6 km	MPC · JPL
291704	2006 JG_{6}	—	May 2, 2006	Mount Nyukasa	Japan Aerospace Exploration Agency	·	1.8 km	MPC · JPL
291705	2006 JE_{7}	—	May 1, 2006	Kitt Peak	Spacewatch	MAR	1.3 km	MPC · JPL
291706	2006 JK_{7}	—	May 1, 2006	Kitt Peak	Spacewatch	·	2.9 km	MPC · JPL
291707	2006 JN_{11}	—	May 1, 2006	Socorro	LINEAR	·	4.6 km	MPC · JPL
291708	2006 JT_{11}	—	May 1, 2006	Kitt Peak	Spacewatch	·	1.5 km	MPC · JPL
291709	2006 JF_{13}	—	May 1, 2006	Kitt Peak	Spacewatch	·	2.0 km	MPC · JPL
291710	2006 JH_{15}	—	May 2, 2006	Mount Lemmon	Mount Lemmon Survey	·	2.2 km	MPC · JPL
291711	2006 JY_{16}	—	May 2, 2006	Kitt Peak	Spacewatch	·	1.1 km	MPC · JPL
291712	2006 JZ_{17}	—	May 2, 2006	Mount Lemmon	Mount Lemmon Survey	·	1.4 km	MPC · JPL
291713	2006 JZ_{18}	—	May 2, 2006	Mount Lemmon	Mount Lemmon Survey	JUN	1.2 km	MPC · JPL
291714	2006 JL_{20}	—	May 2, 2006	Kitt Peak	Spacewatch	·	5.4 km	MPC · JPL
291715	2006 JL_{23}	—	May 3, 2006	Mount Lemmon	Mount Lemmon Survey	·	2.0 km	MPC · JPL
291716	2006 JQ_{23}	—	May 3, 2006	Mount Lemmon	Mount Lemmon Survey	·	1.7 km	MPC · JPL
291717	2006 JR_{23}	—	May 3, 2006	Mount Lemmon	Mount Lemmon Survey	·	1.2 km	MPC · JPL
291718	2006 JN_{26}	—	May 4, 2006	Reedy Creek	J. Broughton	·	2.3 km	MPC · JPL
291719	2006 JK_{27}	—	May 1, 2006	Kitt Peak	Spacewatch	·	1.8 km	MPC · JPL
291720	2006 JT_{28}	—	May 3, 2006	Kitt Peak	Spacewatch	·	810 m	MPC · JPL
291721	2006 JJ_{29}	—	May 3, 2006	Kitt Peak	Spacewatch	·	920 m	MPC · JPL
291722	2006 JP_{29}	—	May 3, 2006	Kitt Peak	Spacewatch	·	3.1 km	MPC · JPL
291723	2006 JM_{32}	—	May 3, 2006	Kitt Peak	Spacewatch	EUN	1.5 km	MPC · JPL
291724	2006 JZ_{33}	—	May 4, 2006	Kitt Peak	Spacewatch	·	1.5 km	MPC · JPL
291725	2006 JQ_{34}	—	May 4, 2006	Kitt Peak	Spacewatch	(2076)	1.1 km	MPC · JPL
291726	2006 JX_{34}	—	May 4, 2006	Kitt Peak	Spacewatch	·	1.5 km	MPC · JPL
291727	2006 JX_{37}	—	May 5, 2006	Anderson Mesa	LONEOS	·	800 m	MPC · JPL
291728	2006 JD_{38}	—	May 6, 2006	Kitt Peak	Spacewatch	·	1.9 km	MPC · JPL
291729	2006 JP_{40}	—	May 7, 2006	Kitt Peak	Spacewatch	·	2.1 km	MPC · JPL
291730	2006 JU_{40}	—	May 7, 2006	Kitt Peak	Spacewatch	·	2.6 km	MPC · JPL
291731	2006 JP_{41}	—	May 7, 2006	Kitt Peak	Spacewatch	·	2.6 km	MPC · JPL
291732	2006 JV_{42}	—	May 2, 2006	Mount Lemmon	Mount Lemmon Survey	MAS	680 m	MPC · JPL
291733	2006 JY_{44}	—	May 7, 2006	Mount Lemmon	Mount Lemmon Survey	NYS	980 m	MPC · JPL
291734	2006 JQ_{47}	—	May 1, 2006	Socorro	LINEAR	·	2.1 km	MPC · JPL
291735	2006 JZ_{47}	—	May 5, 2006	Kitt Peak	Spacewatch	·	2.6 km	MPC · JPL
291736	2006 JR_{49}	—	May 1, 2006	Socorro	LINEAR	·	2.7 km	MPC · JPL
291737	2006 JT_{49}	—	May 1, 2006	Socorro	LINEAR	·	2.0 km	MPC · JPL
291738	2006 JF_{50}	—	May 2, 2006	Mount Lemmon	Mount Lemmon Survey	·	3.0 km	MPC · JPL
291739	2006 JC_{51}	—	May 2, 2006	Mount Lemmon	Mount Lemmon Survey	NYS	1.4 km	MPC · JPL
291740	2006 JZ_{52}	—	May 6, 2006	Kitt Peak	Spacewatch	·	1.7 km	MPC · JPL
291741	2006 JC_{55}	—	May 9, 2006	Mount Lemmon	Mount Lemmon Survey	·	720 m	MPC · JPL
291742	2006 JN_{56}	—	May 5, 2006	Anderson Mesa	LONEOS	·	990 m	MPC · JPL
291743	2006 JM_{64}	—	May 1, 2006	Kitt Peak	M. W. Buie	·	1.9 km	MPC · JPL
291744	2006 JU_{81}	—	May 2, 2006	Mount Lemmon	Mount Lemmon Survey	PAD	1.9 km	MPC · JPL
291745	2006 KH_{1}	—	May 18, 2006	Palomar	NEAT	·	2.3 km	MPC · JPL
291746	2006 KZ_{1}	—	May 16, 2006	Palomar	NEAT	·	3.5 km	MPC · JPL
291747	2006 KZ_{2}	—	May 18, 2006	Palomar	NEAT	·	1.6 km	MPC · JPL
291748	2006 KD_{3}	—	May 19, 2006	Mount Lemmon	Mount Lemmon Survey	·	3.4 km	MPC · JPL
291749	2006 KM_{3}	—	May 19, 2006	Mount Lemmon	Mount Lemmon Survey	·	1.3 km	MPC · JPL
291750	2006 KC_{4}	—	May 19, 2006	Anderson Mesa	LONEOS	·	4.6 km	MPC · JPL
291751	2006 KF_{5}	—	May 19, 2006	Mount Lemmon	Mount Lemmon Survey	·	1.8 km	MPC · JPL
291752	2006 KV_{5}	—	May 19, 2006	Mount Lemmon	Mount Lemmon Survey	·	1.8 km	MPC · JPL
291753	2006 KZ_{5}	—	May 19, 2006	Mount Lemmon	Mount Lemmon Survey	3:2	6.3 km	MPC · JPL
291754	2006 KG_{6}	—	May 19, 2006	Mount Lemmon	Mount Lemmon Survey	HOF	2.7 km	MPC · JPL
291755	2006 KF_{8}	—	May 19, 2006	Mount Lemmon	Mount Lemmon Survey	·	2.5 km	MPC · JPL
291756	2006 KZ_{9}	—	May 19, 2006	Catalina	CSS	·	950 m	MPC · JPL
291757	2006 KM_{10}	—	May 19, 2006	Mount Lemmon	Mount Lemmon Survey	·	2.1 km	MPC · JPL
291758	2006 KJ_{13}	—	May 20, 2006	Kitt Peak	Spacewatch	·	2.8 km	MPC · JPL
291759	2006 KC_{15}	—	May 20, 2006	Catalina	CSS	·	3.0 km	MPC · JPL
291760	2006 KA_{16}	—	May 20, 2006	Palomar	NEAT	KRM	3.0 km	MPC · JPL
291761	2006 KE_{16}	—	May 20, 2006	Palomar	NEAT	V	830 m	MPC · JPL
291762	2006 KM_{16}	—	May 21, 2006	Mount Lemmon	Mount Lemmon Survey	·	1.0 km	MPC · JPL
291763	2006 KC_{18}	—	May 21, 2006	Kitt Peak	Spacewatch	·	2.9 km	MPC · JPL
291764	2006 KC_{19}	—	May 21, 2006	Kitt Peak	Spacewatch	·	5.1 km	MPC · JPL
291765	2006 KE_{19}	—	May 21, 2006	Catalina	CSS	·	1.2 km	MPC · JPL
291766	2006 KG_{19}	—	May 21, 2006	Palomar	NEAT	·	1.8 km	MPC · JPL
291767	2006 KT_{19}	—	May 16, 2006	Palomar	NEAT	NYS	1.6 km	MPC · JPL
291768	2006 KK_{22}	—	May 20, 2006	Catalina	CSS	·	1.5 km	MPC · JPL
291769	2006 KP_{25}	—	May 19, 2006	Mount Lemmon	Mount Lemmon Survey	·	790 m	MPC · JPL
291770	2006 KX_{27}	—	May 20, 2006	Kitt Peak	Spacewatch	·	1.2 km	MPC · JPL
291771	2006 KS_{28}	—	May 20, 2006	Kitt Peak	Spacewatch	·	710 m	MPC · JPL
291772	2006 KT_{28}	—	May 20, 2006	Kitt Peak	Spacewatch	(2076)	1.0 km	MPC · JPL
291773	2006 KC_{29}	—	May 20, 2006	Kitt Peak	Spacewatch	THM	2.4 km	MPC · JPL
291774	2006 KV_{31}	—	May 20, 2006	Kitt Peak	Spacewatch	·	1.4 km	MPC · JPL
291775	2006 KP_{34}	—	May 20, 2006	Kitt Peak	Spacewatch	·	1.4 km	MPC · JPL
291776	2006 KY_{34}	—	May 20, 2006	Kitt Peak	Spacewatch	·	1.3 km	MPC · JPL
291777	2006 KB_{35}	—	May 20, 2006	Kitt Peak	Spacewatch	·	1.1 km	MPC · JPL
291778	2006 KD_{35}	—	May 20, 2006	Kitt Peak	Spacewatch	·	1.3 km	MPC · JPL
291779	2006 KJ_{35}	—	May 20, 2006	Kitt Peak	Spacewatch	AGN	1.3 km	MPC · JPL
291780	2006 KO_{38}	—	May 20, 2006	Kitt Peak	Spacewatch	H	770 m	MPC · JPL
291781	2006 KE_{39}	—	May 17, 2006	Palomar	NEAT	·	1.5 km	MPC · JPL
291782	2006 KP_{41}	—	May 19, 2006	Palomar	NEAT	·	2.2 km	MPC · JPL
291783	2006 KF_{42}	—	May 20, 2006	Kitt Peak	Spacewatch	·	830 m	MPC · JPL
291784	2006 KW_{43}	—	May 20, 2006	Siding Spring	SSS	·	1.5 km	MPC · JPL
291785	2006 KY_{46}	—	May 21, 2006	Mount Lemmon	Mount Lemmon Survey	·	1.6 km	MPC · JPL
291786	2006 KR_{48}	—	May 21, 2006	Kitt Peak	Spacewatch	·	1.0 km	MPC · JPL
291787	2006 KQ_{50}	—	May 21, 2006	Kitt Peak	Spacewatch	·	1.9 km	MPC · JPL
291788	2006 KM_{53}	—	May 21, 2006	Kitt Peak	Spacewatch	·	2.3 km	MPC · JPL
291789	2006 KR_{53}	—	May 21, 2006	Kitt Peak	Spacewatch	ERI	1.8 km	MPC · JPL
291790	2006 KK_{54}	—	May 21, 2006	Kitt Peak	Spacewatch	·	800 m	MPC · JPL
291791	2006 KL_{55}	—	May 21, 2006	Palomar	NEAT	·	1.6 km	MPC · JPL
291792	2006 KU_{57}	—	May 22, 2006	Kitt Peak	Spacewatch	·	2.8 km	MPC · JPL
291793	2006 KA_{60}	—	May 22, 2006	Kitt Peak	Spacewatch	·	1.8 km	MPC · JPL
291794	2006 KG_{64}	—	May 23, 2006	Kitt Peak	Spacewatch	·	1.4 km	MPC · JPL
291795	2006 KC_{65}	—	May 23, 2006	Mount Lemmon	Mount Lemmon Survey	·	1.0 km	MPC · JPL
291796	2006 KE_{65}	—	May 23, 2006	Mount Lemmon	Mount Lemmon Survey	·	810 m	MPC · JPL
291797	2006 KG_{66}	—	May 24, 2006	Mount Lemmon	Mount Lemmon Survey	·	2.0 km	MPC · JPL
291798	2006 KA_{68}	—	May 19, 2006	Palomar	NEAT	·	2.0 km	MPC · JPL
291799	2006 KL_{69}	—	May 22, 2006	Kitt Peak	Spacewatch	V	810 m	MPC · JPL
291800	2006 KR_{71}	—	May 22, 2006	Kitt Peak	Spacewatch	·	890 m	MPC · JPL

== 291801–291900 ==
back to top

Designation			Discovery			Properties		Ref
Permanent	Provisional	Named after	Date	Site	Discoverer(s)	Category	Diam.	Ref
291801	2006 KZ_{71}	—	May 22, 2006	Kitt Peak	Spacewatch	HNS	1.4 km	MPC · JPL
291802	2006 KJ_{74}	—	May 23, 2006	Kitt Peak	Spacewatch	·	1.6 km	MPC · JPL
291803	2006 KH_{75}	—	May 24, 2006	Kitt Peak	Spacewatch	·	4.8 km	MPC · JPL
291804	2006 KE_{76}	—	May 24, 2006	Palomar	NEAT	·	1.3 km	MPC · JPL
291805	2006 KX_{80}	—	May 25, 2006	Mount Lemmon	Mount Lemmon Survey	·	850 m	MPC · JPL
291806	2006 KV_{83}	—	May 21, 2006	Mount Lemmon	Mount Lemmon Survey	·	2.1 km	MPC · JPL
291807	2006 KG_{89}	—	May 29, 2006	Mount Lemmon	Mount Lemmon Survey	L5 · 010	18 km	MPC · JPL
291808	2006 KK_{90}	—	May 24, 2006	Palomar	NEAT	·	4.2 km	MPC · JPL
291809	2006 KH_{91}	—	May 25, 2006	Kitt Peak	Spacewatch	KON	2.7 km	MPC · JPL
291810	2006 KN_{91}	—	May 25, 2006	Kitt Peak	Spacewatch	·	5.7 km	MPC · JPL
291811	2006 KK_{94}	—	May 25, 2006	Kitt Peak	Spacewatch	HOF	3.1 km	MPC · JPL
291812	2006 KC_{95}	—	May 25, 2006	Kitt Peak	Spacewatch	·	1.5 km	MPC · JPL
291813	2006 KD_{97}	—	May 25, 2006	Mount Lemmon	Mount Lemmon Survey	·	1.4 km	MPC · JPL
291814	2006 KB_{98}	—	May 26, 2006	Kitt Peak	Spacewatch	·	2.1 km	MPC · JPL
291815	2006 KP_{99}	—	May 27, 2006	Catalina	CSS	·	1.6 km	MPC · JPL
291816	2006 KS_{99}	—	May 28, 2006	Socorro	LINEAR	·	1.2 km	MPC · JPL
291817	2006 KP_{100}	—	May 24, 2006	Kitt Peak	Spacewatch	PHO	1.3 km	MPC · JPL
291818	2006 KY_{104}	—	May 28, 2006	Kitt Peak	Spacewatch	·	4.0 km	MPC · JPL
291819	2006 KO_{116}	—	May 29, 2006	Kitt Peak	Spacewatch	MAS	740 m	MPC · JPL
291820	2006 KN_{117}	—	May 29, 2006	Kitt Peak	Spacewatch	·	1.6 km	MPC · JPL
291821	2006 KU_{118}	—	May 30, 2006	Mount Lemmon	Mount Lemmon Survey	NYS	1.0 km	MPC · JPL
291822	2006 KB_{121}	—	May 21, 2006	Palomar	NEAT	·	3.0 km	MPC · JPL
291823	2006 KH_{121}	—	May 23, 2006	Siding Spring	SSS	·	4.0 km	MPC · JPL
291824 Cami	2006 KH_{133}	Cami	May 25, 2006	Mauna Kea	P. A. Wiegert	·	1.8 km	MPC · JPL
291825	2006 KL_{143}	—	May 22, 2006	Kitt Peak	Spacewatch	·	750 m	MPC · JPL
291826	2006 KZ_{143}	—	May 20, 2006	Kitt Peak	Spacewatch	·	800 m	MPC · JPL
291827	2006 LE	—	June 1, 2006	Mount Lemmon	Mount Lemmon Survey	·	1.7 km	MPC · JPL
291828	2006 LF_{2}	—	June 15, 2006	Kitt Peak	Spacewatch	MAR	1.4 km	MPC · JPL
291829	2006 LO_{2}	—	June 4, 2006	Socorro	LINEAR	·	1.1 km	MPC · JPL
291830	2006 LP_{2}	—	June 4, 2006	Socorro	LINEAR	·	2.0 km	MPC · JPL
291831	2006 LX_{3}	—	June 15, 2006	Kitt Peak	Spacewatch	·	1.9 km	MPC · JPL
291832	2006 LO_{4}	—	June 11, 2006	Palomar	NEAT	·	4.5 km	MPC · JPL
291833	2006 LP_{4}	—	June 11, 2006	Palomar	NEAT	·	3.9 km	MPC · JPL
291834	2006 LQ_{4}	—	June 3, 2006	Catalina	CSS	·	930 m	MPC · JPL
291835	2006 LC_{5}	—	June 3, 2006	Mount Lemmon	Mount Lemmon Survey	NYS	1.5 km	MPC · JPL
291836	2006 LD_{7}	—	June 9, 2006	Palomar	NEAT	·	1.3 km	MPC · JPL
291837	2006 MH_{2}	—	June 16, 2006	Kitt Peak	Spacewatch	·	890 m	MPC · JPL
291838	2006 MV_{2}	—	June 16, 2006	Kitt Peak	Spacewatch	·	1.4 km	MPC · JPL
291839	2006 MJ_{4}	—	June 17, 2006	Kitt Peak	Spacewatch	·	850 m	MPC · JPL
291840	2006 MK_{5}	—	June 17, 2006	Kitt Peak	Spacewatch	MAR	1.1 km	MPC · JPL
291841	2006 MQ_{7}	—	June 18, 2006	Kitt Peak	Spacewatch	TEL	2.0 km	MPC · JPL
291842	2006 MY_{7}	—	June 18, 2006	Kitt Peak	Spacewatch	·	1.9 km	MPC · JPL
291843	2006 MZ_{8}	—	June 19, 2006	Mount Lemmon	Mount Lemmon Survey	·	830 m	MPC · JPL
291844	2006 ME_{13}	—	June 24, 2006	Hibiscus	S. F. Hönig	·	1.7 km	MPC · JPL
291845	2006 MW_{13}	—	June 27, 2006	Siding Spring	SSS	BAR	1.9 km	MPC · JPL
291846	2006 MD_{14}	—	June 17, 2006	Siding Spring	SSS	·	2.4 km	MPC · JPL
291847 Ladoix	2006 OP_{1}	Ladoix	July 19, 2006	Vicques	M. Ory	·	1.5 km	MPC · JPL
291848	2006 OY_{1}	—	July 18, 2006	Reedy Creek	J. Broughton	·	3.0 km	MPC · JPL
291849 Orchestralondon	2006 OL_{2}	Orchestralondon	July 18, 2006	Lulin	Q. Ye, Lin, H.-C.	·	2.2 km	MPC · JPL
291850	2006 OV_{4}	—	July 22, 2006	Pla D'Arguines	R. Ferrando	·	1.4 km	MPC · JPL
291851	2006 OZ_{5}	—	July 19, 2006	Palomar	NEAT	·	1.3 km	MPC · JPL
291852	2006 OW_{8}	—	July 20, 2006	Palomar	NEAT	·	1.1 km	MPC · JPL
291853	2006 OM_{9}	—	July 24, 2006	Hibiscus	S. F. Hönig	(2076)	920 m	MPC · JPL
291854	2006 OM_{13}	—	July 21, 2006	Palomar	NEAT	·	6.7 km	MPC · JPL
291855 Calabròcorrado	2006 ON_{14}	Calabròcorrado	July 28, 2006	Andrushivka	Andrushivka	NYS	1.3 km	MPC · JPL
291856	2006 OV_{14}	—	July 20, 2006	Reedy Creek	J. Broughton	·	3.0 km	MPC · JPL
291857	2006 OY_{15}	—	July 29, 2006	Reedy Creek	J. Broughton	·	1.4 km	MPC · JPL
291858	2006 OQ_{16}	—	July 20, 2006	Palomar	NEAT	·	1.6 km	MPC · JPL
291859	2006 OG_{18}	—	July 20, 2006	Siding Spring	SSS	·	6.0 km	MPC · JPL
291860	2006 OZ_{20}	—	July 30, 2006	Siding Spring	SSS	EUN	1.7 km	MPC · JPL
291861	2006 PG	—	August 2, 2006	Pla D'Arguines	R. Ferrando	·	4.6 km	MPC · JPL
291862	2006 PX	—	August 11, 2006	Lulin	Lin, H.-C., Q. Ye	·	2.1 km	MPC · JPL
291863	2006 PL_{3}	—	August 12, 2006	Palomar	NEAT	·	2.8 km	MPC · JPL
291864	2006 PH_{4}	—	August 15, 2006	Reedy Creek	J. Broughton	·	880 m	MPC · JPL
291865	2006 PX_{4}	—	August 12, 2006	Palomar	NEAT	·	3.0 km	MPC · JPL
291866	2006 PF_{5}	—	August 12, 2006	Palomar	NEAT	NYS	1.2 km	MPC · JPL
291867	2006 PT_{5}	—	November 18, 1996	Kitt Peak	Spacewatch	V	890 m	MPC · JPL
291868	2006 PT_{7}	—	August 12, 2006	Palomar	NEAT	·	1.4 km	MPC · JPL
291869	2006 PO_{9}	—	August 13, 2006	Palomar	NEAT	·	960 m	MPC · JPL
291870	2006 PA_{10}	—	August 13, 2006	Palomar	NEAT	·	1.6 km	MPC · JPL
291871	2006 PT_{11}	—	August 13, 2006	Palomar	NEAT	·	780 m	MPC · JPL
291872	2006 PE_{12}	—	August 13, 2006	Palomar	NEAT	·	990 m	MPC · JPL
291873	2006 PF_{12}	—	August 13, 2006	Palomar	NEAT	·	1.2 km	MPC · JPL
291874	2006 PL_{12}	—	August 13, 2006	Palomar	NEAT	·	1.6 km	MPC · JPL
291875	2006 PW_{15}	—	August 15, 2006	Palomar	NEAT	·	900 m	MPC · JPL
291876	2006 PO_{17}	—	August 15, 2006	Lulin	Lin, C.-S., Q. Ye	·	1.5 km	MPC · JPL
291877	2006 PB_{18}	—	August 15, 2006	Palomar	NEAT	·	930 m	MPC · JPL
291878	2006 PU_{18}	—	August 13, 2006	Palomar	NEAT	NYS	1.4 km	MPC · JPL
291879	2006 PW_{19}	—	August 13, 2006	Palomar	NEAT	·	1.4 km	MPC · JPL
291880	2006 PQ_{20}	—	August 15, 2006	Palomar	NEAT	·	980 m	MPC · JPL
291881	2006 PJ_{22}	—	August 15, 2006	Lulin	Lin, C.-S., Q. Ye	·	1.4 km	MPC · JPL
291882	2006 PZ_{22}	—	August 15, 2006	Siding Spring	SSS	JUN	1.5 km	MPC · JPL
291883	2006 PF_{23}	—	August 12, 2006	Palomar	NEAT	·	1.3 km	MPC · JPL
291884	2006 PC_{24}	—	August 12, 2006	Palomar	NEAT	·	1.5 km	MPC · JPL
291885	2006 PE_{25}	—	August 13, 2006	Palomar	NEAT	MAS	930 m	MPC · JPL
291886	2006 PG_{26}	—	August 15, 2006	Palomar	NEAT	NYS	1.3 km	MPC · JPL
291887	2006 PM_{26}	—	August 15, 2006	Palomar	NEAT	NYS	1.4 km	MPC · JPL
291888	2006 PC_{29}	—	August 10, 2006	Palomar	NEAT	·	1.2 km	MPC · JPL
291889	2006 PQ_{30}	—	August 12, 2006	Palomar	NEAT	GEF	1.8 km	MPC · JPL
291890	2006 PD_{31}	—	August 13, 2006	Palomar	NEAT	·	3.6 km	MPC · JPL
291891	2006 PW_{34}	—	August 12, 2006	Palomar	NEAT	·	1.0 km	MPC · JPL
291892	2006 PN_{35}	—	August 12, 2006	Palomar	NEAT	·	1.5 km	MPC · JPL
291893	2006 PO_{36}	—	August 12, 2006	Palomar	NEAT	·	1.5 km	MPC · JPL
291894	2006 PN_{42}	—	August 14, 2006	Siding Spring	SSS	(5)	1.3 km	MPC · JPL
291895	2006 QP_{1}	—	August 16, 2006	Siding Spring	SSS	·	1.2 km	MPC · JPL
291896	2006 QW_{3}	—	August 18, 2006	Kitt Peak	Spacewatch	·	2.3 km	MPC · JPL
291897	2006 QY_{3}	—	August 18, 2006	Kitt Peak	Spacewatch	KOR	1.7 km	MPC · JPL
291898	2006 QN_{4}	—	August 17, 2006	Goodricke-Pigott	R. A. Tucker	·	1.7 km	MPC · JPL
291899	2006 QS_{4}	—	August 18, 2006	Piszkéstető	K. Sárneczky, Kuli, Z.	MAS	720 m	MPC · JPL
291900	2006 QU_{4}	—	August 19, 2006	Piszkéstető	K. Sárneczky, Kuli, Z.	THB	3.3 km	MPC · JPL

== 291901–292000 ==
back to top

Designation			Discovery			Properties		Ref
Permanent	Provisional	Named after	Date	Site	Discoverer(s)	Category	Diam.	Ref
291901	2006 QB_{8}	—	August 19, 2006	Kitt Peak	Spacewatch	·	790 m	MPC · JPL
291902	2006 QG_{8}	—	August 19, 2006	Kitt Peak	Spacewatch	·	1.1 km	MPC · JPL
291903	2006 QM_{8}	—	August 19, 2006	Kitt Peak	Spacewatch	·	2.4 km	MPC · JPL
291904	2006 QT_{9}	—	August 19, 2006	Kitt Peak	Spacewatch	·	3.6 km	MPC · JPL
291905	2006 QU_{9}	—	August 19, 2006	Kitt Peak	Spacewatch	·	4.1 km	MPC · JPL
291906	2006 QK_{10}	—	August 19, 2006	Reedy Creek	J. Broughton	EUN	1.5 km	MPC · JPL
291907	2006 QU_{10}	—	August 17, 2006	Palomar	NEAT	·	730 m	MPC · JPL
291908	2006 QM_{11}	—	August 16, 2006	Siding Spring	SSS	·	3.9 km	MPC · JPL
291909	2006 QP_{11}	—	August 16, 2006	Siding Spring	SSS	NYS	1.5 km	MPC · JPL
291910	2006 QU_{11}	—	August 16, 2006	Siding Spring	SSS	·	2.6 km	MPC · JPL
291911	2006 QV_{11}	—	August 16, 2006	Siding Spring	SSS	·	3.9 km	MPC · JPL
291912	2006 QK_{15}	—	August 17, 2006	Palomar	NEAT	·	1.7 km	MPC · JPL
291913	2006 QL_{15}	—	August 17, 2006	Palomar	NEAT	·	2.7 km	MPC · JPL
291914	2006 QD_{17}	—	August 17, 2006	Palomar	NEAT	·	1.0 km	MPC · JPL
291915	2006 QQ_{17}	—	August 17, 2006	Palomar	NEAT	NYS	1.4 km	MPC · JPL
291916	2006 QW_{17}	—	August 17, 2006	Palomar	NEAT	·	1.1 km	MPC · JPL
291917	2006 QS_{18}	—	August 17, 2006	Palomar	NEAT	·	2.2 km	MPC · JPL
291918	2006 QB_{19}	—	August 17, 2006	Palomar	NEAT	·	950 m	MPC · JPL
291919	2006 QU_{20}	—	August 18, 2006	Anderson Mesa	LONEOS	·	1.1 km	MPC · JPL
291920	2006 QY_{22}	—	August 19, 2006	Anderson Mesa	LONEOS	·	890 m	MPC · JPL
291921 Rott	2006 QL_{23}	Rott	August 21, 2006	Dax	Dax	V	850 m	MPC · JPL
291922	2006 QM_{23}	—	August 20, 2006	Wildberg	R. Apitzsch	MRX	1.0 km	MPC · JPL
291923 Kuzmaskryabin	2006 QW_{23}	Kuzmaskryabin	August 16, 2006	Andrushivka	Andrushivka	NYS	1.3 km	MPC · JPL
291924	2006 QJ_{25}	—	August 18, 2006	Socorro	LINEAR	·	2.9 km	MPC · JPL
291925	2006 QD_{26}	—	August 19, 2006	Kitt Peak	Spacewatch	·	1.7 km	MPC · JPL
291926	2006 QM_{26}	—	August 19, 2006	Kitt Peak	Spacewatch	·	3.0 km	MPC · JPL
291927	2006 QH_{27}	—	August 19, 2006	Palomar	NEAT	·	1.3 km	MPC · JPL
291928	2006 QS_{27}	—	August 20, 2006	Kitt Peak	Spacewatch	·	1.7 km	MPC · JPL
291929	2006 QG_{28}	—	August 20, 2006	Kitt Peak	Spacewatch	·	2.0 km	MPC · JPL
291930	2006 QQ_{28}	—	August 21, 2006	Kitt Peak	Spacewatch	MAS	680 m	MPC · JPL
291931	2006 QD_{29}	—	August 21, 2006	Kitt Peak	Spacewatch	·	2.1 km	MPC · JPL
291932	2006 QJ_{29}	—	August 16, 2006	Siding Spring	SSS	·	1.3 km	MPC · JPL
291933	2006 QE_{30}	—	August 20, 2006	Palomar	NEAT	·	1.0 km	MPC · JPL
291934	2006 QN_{30}	—	August 21, 2006	Socorro	LINEAR	·	760 m	MPC · JPL
291935	2006 QS_{30}	—	August 22, 2006	Palomar	NEAT	GEF	2.3 km	MPC · JPL
291936	2006 QU_{30}	—	August 22, 2006	Palomar	NEAT	·	4.2 km	MPC · JPL
291937	2006 QD_{31}	—	August 22, 2006	Reedy Creek	J. Broughton	TIR	4.4 km	MPC · JPL
291938	2006 QN_{32}	—	August 21, 2006	Palomar	NEAT	T_{j} (2.94)	5.8 km	MPC · JPL
291939	2006 QX_{32}	—	August 22, 2006	Palomar	NEAT	·	3.1 km	MPC · JPL
291940	2006 QN_{33}	—	August 23, 2006	Hibiscus	S. F. Hönig	·	2.5 km	MPC · JPL
291941	2006 QW_{33}	—	August 23, 2006	Marly	Observatoire Naef	·	1.5 km	MPC · JPL
291942	2006 QD_{34}	—	August 22, 2006	Palomar	NEAT	GEF	1.5 km	MPC · JPL
291943	2006 QB_{36}	—	August 19, 2006	Palomar	NEAT	·	2.1 km	MPC · JPL
291944	2006 QG_{36}	—	August 21, 2006	Palomar	NEAT	·	3.1 km	MPC · JPL
291945	2006 QL_{36}	—	August 16, 2006	Siding Spring	SSS	·	950 m	MPC · JPL
291946	2006 QB_{37}	—	August 16, 2006	Siding Spring	SSS	·	1.3 km	MPC · JPL
291947	2006 QZ_{38}	—	August 18, 2006	Anderson Mesa	LONEOS	·	3.3 km	MPC · JPL
291948	2006 QV_{40}	—	August 17, 2006	Palomar	NEAT	·	670 m	MPC · JPL
291949	2006 QG_{41}	—	August 17, 2006	Palomar	NEAT	·	1.8 km	MPC · JPL
291950	2006 QM_{41}	—	August 17, 2006	Palomar	NEAT	·	1.2 km	MPC · JPL
291951	2006 QP_{41}	—	August 17, 2006	Palomar	NEAT	·	3.3 km	MPC · JPL
291952	2006 QL_{42}	—	August 17, 2006	Palomar	NEAT	·	1.2 km	MPC · JPL
291953	2006 QX_{42}	—	August 17, 2006	Palomar	NEAT	·	1.9 km	MPC · JPL
291954	2006 QC_{43}	—	August 17, 2006	Palomar	NEAT	·	920 m	MPC · JPL
291955	2006 QR_{43}	—	August 18, 2006	Kitt Peak	Spacewatch	·	2.7 km	MPC · JPL
291956	2006 QM_{45}	—	August 19, 2006	Palomar	NEAT	·	990 m	MPC · JPL
291957	2006 QT_{46}	—	August 20, 2006	Palomar	NEAT	·	2.4 km	MPC · JPL
291958	2006 QL_{47}	—	August 20, 2006	Palomar	NEAT	·	1.5 km	MPC · JPL
291959	2006 QJ_{51}	—	August 23, 2006	Palomar	NEAT	·	1.6 km	MPC · JPL
291960	2006 QM_{51}	—	August 23, 2006	Palomar	NEAT	·	1.0 km	MPC · JPL
291961	2006 QW_{51}	—	August 23, 2006	Palomar	NEAT	·	2.5 km	MPC · JPL
291962	2006 QN_{52}	—	August 23, 2006	Palomar	NEAT	·	1.5 km	MPC · JPL
291963	2006 QO_{54}	—	August 17, 2006	Palomar	NEAT	·	1.6 km	MPC · JPL
291964	2006 QH_{58}	—	August 26, 2006	Socorro	LINEAR	·	1.7 km	MPC · JPL
291965	2006 QY_{59}	—	August 19, 2006	Anderson Mesa	LONEOS	·	1.4 km	MPC · JPL
291966	2006 QV_{60}	—	August 21, 2006	Socorro	LINEAR	·	900 m	MPC · JPL
291967	2006 QO_{61}	—	August 22, 2006	Palomar	NEAT	·	1.9 km	MPC · JPL
291968	2006 QX_{63}	—	August 24, 2006	Palomar	NEAT	EOS	2.5 km	MPC · JPL
291969	2006 QX_{64}	—	August 27, 2006	Kitt Peak	Spacewatch	·	2.9 km	MPC · JPL
291970	2006 QC_{66}	—	August 20, 2006	Kitt Peak	Spacewatch	V	710 m	MPC · JPL
291971	2006 QC_{77}	—	August 21, 2006	Kitt Peak	Spacewatch	·	3.1 km	MPC · JPL
291972	2006 QU_{77}	—	August 22, 2006	Palomar	NEAT	·	3.2 km	MPC · JPL
291973	2006 QD_{78}	—	August 22, 2006	Palomar	NEAT	·	1.0 km	MPC · JPL
291974	2006 QH_{78}	—	August 22, 2006	Palomar	NEAT	MAS	810 m	MPC · JPL
291975	2006 QJ_{78}	—	August 22, 2006	Palomar	NEAT	·	1.1 km	MPC · JPL
291976	2006 QR_{78}	—	August 22, 2006	Palomar	NEAT	·	5.5 km	MPC · JPL
291977	2006 QR_{79}	—	August 24, 2006	Socorro	LINEAR	·	5.4 km	MPC · JPL
291978	2006 QJ_{83}	—	August 27, 2006	Kitt Peak	Spacewatch	·	1.0 km	MPC · JPL
291979	2006 QT_{83}	—	August 27, 2006	Kitt Peak	Spacewatch	·	2.2 km	MPC · JPL
291980	2006 QM_{86}	—	August 27, 2006	Kitt Peak	Spacewatch	CLO	2.2 km	MPC · JPL
291981	2006 QH_{88}	—	August 27, 2006	Kitt Peak	Spacewatch	AGN	1.8 km	MPC · JPL
291982	2006 QN_{88}	—	August 27, 2006	Kitt Peak	Spacewatch	MAS	780 m	MPC · JPL
291983	2006 QN_{95}	—	August 16, 2006	Palomar	NEAT	·	1.1 km	MPC · JPL
291984	2006 QC_{96}	—	August 16, 2006	Palomar	NEAT	·	1.5 km	MPC · JPL
291985	2006 QZ_{96}	—	August 17, 2006	Palomar	NEAT	·	1.6 km	MPC · JPL
291986	2006 QJ_{97}	—	August 20, 2006	Kitt Peak	Spacewatch	·	2.4 km	MPC · JPL
291987	2006 QK_{97}	—	August 20, 2006	Kitt Peak	Spacewatch	·	980 m	MPC · JPL
291988	2006 QO_{99}	—	August 23, 2006	Palomar	NEAT	·	3.1 km	MPC · JPL
291989	2006 QQ_{100}	—	August 24, 2006	Palomar	NEAT	·	860 m	MPC · JPL
291990	2006 QO_{104}	—	August 28, 2006	Anderson Mesa	LONEOS	·	1.7 km	MPC · JPL
291991	2006 QR_{105}	—	August 28, 2006	Catalina	CSS	·	1.4 km	MPC · JPL
291992	2006 QB_{107}	—	August 28, 2006	Anderson Mesa	LONEOS	·	1.7 km	MPC · JPL
291993	2006 QY_{107}	—	August 28, 2006	Catalina	CSS	·	710 m	MPC · JPL
291994	2006 QO_{108}	—	August 28, 2006	Catalina	CSS	NYS	1.2 km	MPC · JPL
291995	2006 QX_{111}	—	August 22, 2006	Palomar	NEAT	·	1.3 km	MPC · JPL
291996	2006 QO_{112}	—	August 23, 2006	Palomar	NEAT	(2076)	1.1 km	MPC · JPL
291997	2006 QJ_{113}	—	August 24, 2006	Socorro	LINEAR	·	1.5 km	MPC · JPL
291998	2006 QW_{114}	—	August 27, 2006	Anderson Mesa	LONEOS	·	1.9 km	MPC · JPL
291999	2006 QX_{115}	—	August 27, 2006	Anderson Mesa	LONEOS	·	3.7 km	MPC · JPL
292000	2006 QF_{117}	—	August 27, 2006	Anderson Mesa	LONEOS	·	1.3 km	MPC · JPL

back to top

== See also ==
- Meanings of minor-planet names: 291001–292000
