= Cami Sawyer =

American and New Zealand mathematics educator

Cameron Cunningham (Cami) Sawyer is an American mathematician who has worked in New Zealand at Massey University and the Ministry of Education. Trained in algebraic topology, her work in New Zealand has focused on mathematics education, educational technology, distance learning, and the needs of Māori students in mathematics.

== Education and career ==
Sawyer has a postgraduate diploma in teaching from Texas State University, and completed a PhD in 1999 at the University of North Texas. Her dissertation, On the Cohomology of the Complement of a Toral Arrangement, was supervised by J. Matthew Douglass.

She had already visited New Zealand under a Rotary Scholarship in the 1980s, and in the early 2000s emigrated there with her husband and children. She became a secondary school teacher before joining the Massey University staff as a senior tutor in mathematics in the Institute of Fundamental Sciences. Since 2015, she has also been associated with the Pūhoro STEM Academy, a program hosted by Massey for encouraging secondary-school Māori to continue their science and technology education.

In 2021 she moved from Massey to the Ministry of Education, as Learning Area Lead of Mathematics and Statistics.

== Recognition and service ==
Sawyer is a Fellow of the New Zealand Mathematical Society (NZMS), and has chaired the NZMS Education Group. In 2019 she won a Sustained Excellence in Tertiary Teaching Award in the Te Whatu Kairangi Awards of the Ako Aotearoa National Centre for Tertiary Teaching Excellence, a government-funded organisation for the support and promotion of tertiary-level education.
