= Ben Cami =

Ben Cami (30 August 1920 in Durham – 15 November 2004) was a Flemish poet.

== Biography ==
Cami was born in Durham, England, but his family soon moved to Belgium. After studying Germanic languages he became a teacher at various public schools, until 1975. He was one of the founders of the experimental Flemish magazine Tijd en Mens, and a member of the editorial board along with Louis Paul Boon, Jan Walravens, and Hugo Claus. He was not a very active editor and was not, he said later, interested in participating in the literary life of "lectures, meetings, and associations". Early in his career he used the pseudonym Johan Benth. His first volume of poetry was published privately in 1950, In de tijd verloren, whose poems were praised by Flemish critic Karel Jonckheere for their inspired content but criticized for a lack of rhythmic and lyrical qualities. He also wrote and published short stories.

== Criticism ==
According to Hugo Brems, author of a 1986 review article occasioned by the publication of the anthology Gedichten 1954-1983, Cami's poetry is that of a mildly anarchist outsider, though his early poetry differs starkly from his later work, developing from more general analysis and critiques of man in general to more quotidian observations of individualized people and objects. For Brems, Cami's poetry doesn't start until the publication of Het land van Nod, a collection (really, one single long poem) in which the poet pictures himself as Cain, who wanders alone through a biblical and mythical landscape, a godless world. Though the content of the volume established Cami's status as an avant-garde poet (in the style of Tijd en Mens), Cain having metaphorically killed God by killing Abel, its style, according to Brems, is solemn and in places almost sacred. Later collections were less homogeneous and of lesser quality, and his 1974 volume Wat ik wil is gelijk aan nul are, according to Brems, little more than anecdotal comments on the times; the poet does not regain his poetic voice until the last collection, Wat is er met de dood gaande?, which Brems praises for its atmosphere and suggestive power.

Cami was long unknown and forgotten. Paul Bogaert, writing in Tijd en Mens, argued his writing was old fashioned, and Patrick Peeters, in the Poëziekrant, says Cami was too traditional for the experimental poetry of his time, too abstract for neo-realism, too ironic or possibly too cynical for neo-romanticism, and only connected briefly with the socially and politically engaged poetry of the 1960s.

Twelve years later, at the publication of Cami's last volume, Ten westen van Eden ("West of Eden"), Koen Vergeer, poetry critic for De Morgen, noted that Cami's reputation also suffered from a lack of consistency: "If you reread the collections you see much inconsistency: the lyrical-prophetic tone of Het land Nod, dark poetic prose in Roos uit modder, engaged anger in Blanco stem, to little-poetic effusions in Wat ik wil is gelijk aan nul". What is consistent, says Vergeer, is fear and nihilism, and in his best moments, especially after Ten westen van Eden, he moves beyond nihilism to "what really drives him".

== Collections ==
- In de tijd verloren (1950)
- Het land Nod (1954)
- Roos uit modder (1959)
- Doorsneemens (1961)
- Blanco stem (1967)
- Wat ik wil is gelijk aan nul (1974)
- Wat is met de dood gaande? (1978)
- Gedichten 1954-1983 (1984)
- Brief aan Dorothy en andere verhalen (1987)
- Ik ben hier vreemd (1988)
- Ten westen van Eden (1998)

== Awards ==
- Dirk Martensprijs - Wat ik wil is gelijk aan nul (1974)
- Prijs van de stad Brussel - Wat is met de dood gaande? (1978)
- Herman Gorterprijs - Ten westen van Eden (1999)
