= Kami (surname) =

Kami is a Japanese surname. Notable people with the surname include:

- Hisao Kami (born 1941), Japanese football player and manager
- Sompal Kami (born 1996), Nepalese cricketer
- Tomoko Kami (born 1955), Japanese politician
