= Kami Sid =

- Born: Karachi, Pakistan
- Citizenship: Pakistan
- Occupations: Fashion model; actor; LGBTQ rights activist
- Notable work: Rani, Dil e Nadan

Kami Sid is a Pakistani transgender fashion model, actor, and LGBTQ rights activist.

== Early life and education ==
Sid was born to a middle-class family in Karachi comprising seven siblings. Sid's father died during her adolescence and she was raised by a supportive mother. She has a bachelor's degree in Business Studies. She tried to go to the UK for higher studies, but was unable to get a visa. Among the trans communities in Pakistan, Sid belongs to the Khawaja Sira community.

== Career ==
In 2012, Sid travelled to Thailand for their first photoshoot. The exposure as Pakistan's first trans model brought about a lot of backlash.

In November 2016, Sid did a photoshoot as a form of protest against the atrocities committed against transgender people in Pakistan. On the Pakistani Independence Day of 2017, Sid posed on a rooftop in Karachi while holding up the Pakistani flag. She has given a lecture on transphobia and misogyny in the Karachi Literature Festival in London. Sid is a board member of this non-profit organisation called 'Street to School', which teaches sex-ed and cultural diversity to schoolchildren. She is the program coordinator of the Aks International Minorities Festival in Copenhagen, Denmark.

In 2017, Sid made her acting debut in the short film Rani as a transgender toy seller who makes her living selling the items on the streets of Karachi. Produced by GrayScale and Rizvilia Productions, the film is directed by Hammad Rizvi. She was also cast in a play titled Dil e Nadan, a play based on a trans person and their relationship with society.

Kami Sid was also accused of rape and sexual assault after which Aurat March organizers removed her from serving as a part of their organizing team in 2018. Though Kami rejects the allegations but Aurat March organizers issued a statement that Sid intimidated them. Kami Sid's participation in the PR campaign Change The Clap has also been critiqued for appeasing neoliberal forces and ignoring local practices of the Khawaja Sira community.
